= 2022 Spain Women's Sevens =

- Women's Sevens Series IX
- Host nation: Spain

Málaga
- Date: 21–23 January 2022
- Champion: United States
- Runner-up: Russia
- Third: Australia

Tournament details
- Matches played: 29 (Note: The Fiji team withdrew from the tournament due to COVID-19 leaving them unable to field a squad, but were not replaced due to logistical issues in finding a replacement. Thus, their opponents in the Pool Stage received three points and their matches were put down as a "bye", while Fiji's there matches in the Knockout Stage were walkovers with the opposing team automatically advancing. All their fixtures were recorded as 0–0 results.)
- Tries scored: 164 (average 5.65 per match)
- Most points: Jade Ulutule (58 points)
- Most tries: Maddison Levi (7 tries)

Seville
- Date: 28–30 January 2022
- Winner: Australia
- Runner-up: Ireland
- Third: England

Tournament details
- Matches played: 34
- Tries scored: 178 (average 5.24 per match)
- Most points: Amee-Leigh Murphy Crowe (45 points)
- Most tries: Amee-Leigh Murphy Crowe (9 tries)

The 2022 Spain Women's Sevens was played as two back-to-back rugby sevens tournaments on consecutive weekends in late January that year. These events were hosted by the Spanish Rugby Federation as the third and fourth stops on the 2021–22 season of the World Rugby Women's Sevens Series. It was the first time the series was held in Spain.

The United States won the first tournament, held at Estadio Ciudad in Málaga from 21–23 January, defeating Russia in the final by 35–10. The second tournament, held from 28–30 January at Estadio de La Cartuja in Seville, was won by series-leader Australia, with a score of 17–12 over first-time cup finalist Ireland.

== Format ==
The twelve teams are drawn into three pools of four. Each team will play their other three opponents in their pool once. The top two teams from each pool advance to the Cup bracket, with the two best third-placed teams also advancing. The remaining four teams will compete for a 9th–12th placing.

== Teams ==
The twelve national women's teams competing in Spain were:

- Australia
- Belgium
- Brazil
- Canada
- England
- France
- Ireland
- Poland
- Portugal (Seville only)
- Russia
- Spain
- United States

• England, who were represented by Great Britain for the first two tournaments of the 2021–22 Series, returned to compete as a separate national union for the remainder of the series.

• Poland was invited to participate for the first time in a World Sevens Series.

• Belgium was also invited to participate for the first time in a World Sevens Series, replacing New Zealand who were unable to travel due to the COVID-19 pandemic.

• Fiji did not compete in Spain. The team withdrew from both tournaments after members of their squad tested positive for COVID-19. However, Fiji was not replaced in the draw for Málaga. Their matches were recorded as 0–0 byes and their opponents awarded wins automatically via walkover. As such, despite not playing, Fiji was placed twelfth in Málaga and received one point toward their season standings from the event.

• Portugal was invited to participate in Seville, replacing Fiji.

== Málaga ==
=== Pool stage – Málaga ===
==== Pool A – Málaga ====
Team	Pld	W	D	L	PF	PA	PD	Pts
Australia	3	3	0	0	77	17	+60	9
Ireland	3	2	0	1	62	34	+28	7
Spain	3	1	0	2	31	60	–29	5
Belgium	3	0	0	3	36	95	–59	3

21 January
10:28 CET (UTC+1)

Spain	5–21	Ireland
Try: Olivia Fresneda 15' m	Report	Try: Beibhinn Parsons 2' c Stacey Flood 7' c Eve Higgins 9' c Con: Lucy Mulhall (3) 2', 6', 10'

Estadio Ciudad de Málaga
Referee: Katherine Ritchie (England)

21 January
10:50 CET (UTC+1)

Australia	40–5	Belgium
Try: Dominique du Toit (2) 2' m, 5' c Charlotte Caslick 6' c Demi Hayes 10' c Maddison Levi 13' c Tia Hinds 14' c Con: Tia Hinds (5) 5', 7', 10', 13', 14'	Report	Try: Pauline Gernaey 3' m

Estadio Ciudad de Málaga
Referee: Ashleigh Murray-Pretorius (South Africa)

21 January
18:37 CET (UTC+1)

Spain	26–19	Belgium
Try: Anne Fernández de Corres (2) 1' m, 7' c Amaia Erbina 3' c Bruna Elias 12' c Con: Amalia Argudo (2) 3', 7'; Ingrid Algar 13'	Report	Try: Ciska De Grave 8' c Manon Nairac 10' c Cecile Blondiau 14' m Con: Margaux Stevins (2) 9', 10'

Estadio Ciudad de Málaga
Referee: Katherine Ritchie (England)

21 January
19:35 CET (UTC+1)

Australia	17–12	Ireland
Try: Madison Ashby (2) 6' m, 9' c Alysia Lefau-Fakaosilea 11' m Con: Tia Hinds 10'	Report	Try: Stacey Flood 3' m Beibhinn Parsons 8' c Con: Lucy Mulhall 9'

Estadio Ciudad de Málaga
Referee: Julianne Zussman (Canada)

22 January
10:28 CET (UTC+1)

Ireland	29–12	Belgium
Try: Eve Higgins (2) 1' m, 4' c Katie Heffernan 7' m Emily Lane 11' c Beibhinn Parsons 14' m Con: Lucy Mulhall (2) 4', 11'	Report	Try: Margaux Lalli 3' c Manon Nairac 13' m Con: Margaux Stevins 3'

Estadio Ciudad de Málaga
Referee: Ashleigh Murray-Pretorius (South Africa)

22 January
10:50 CET (UTC+1)

Australia	20–0	Spain
Try: Maddison Levi (2) 2' m, 3' m Charlotte Caslick 7' m Demi Hayes 15' m Cards: Demi Hayes (yellow card) 12'	Report

Estadio Ciudad de Málaga
Referee: Jaco De Wit (United Arab Emirates)

==== Pool B – Málaga ====
Team	Pld	W	D	L	B	PF	PA	PD	Pts
United States	2	2	0	0	1	53	14	+39	9
Poland	2	1	0	1	1	24	45	–21	7
Canada	2	0	0	2	1	21	39	–18	5
Fiji	0	0	0	0	3	0	0	0	0

21 January
9:44 CET (UTC+1)

United States	22–7	Canada
Try: Ilona Maher 1' c Naya Tapper 3' m Cheta Emba 8' m Jaz Gray 11' m Con: Nicole Heavirland 2'	Report	Try: Alexandra Tessier 15' c Con: Olivia Apps 15'

Estadio Ciudad de Málaga
Referee: Jaco De Wit (United Arab Emirates)

21 January

Fiji	0–0	Poland
	Report

Estadio Ciudad de Málaga

21 January
15:12 CET (UTC+1)

United States	31–7	Poland
Try: Cheta Emba (2) 2' m, 9' c Kris Thomas 5' m Sarah Levy 13' c Nicole Heavirland 14' c Con: Nicole Heavirland (3) 9', 13', 15'	Report	Try: Małgorzata Kołdej 10' c Con: Natalia Pamieta 11'

Estadio Ciudad de Málaga
Referee: Julianne Zussman (Canada)

21 January

Fiji	0–0	Canada
	Report

Estadio Ciudad de Málaga

22 January
9:44 CET (UTC+1)

Canada	14–17	Poland
Try: Nakisa Levale (2) 9' c, 11' c Con: Breanne Nicholas (2) 10', 12'	Report	Try: Małgorzata Kołdej (3) 1' m, 5' m, 13' c Con: Natalia Pamieta 13'

Estadio Ciudad de Málaga
Referee: Katherine Ritchie (England)

22 January

Fiji	0–0	United States
	Report

Estadio Ciudad de Málaga

==== Pool C – Málaga ====
Team	Pld	W	D	L	PF	PA	PD	Pts
France	3	3	0	0	83	24	+59	9
Russia	3	2	0	1	39	41	–2	7
England	3	1	0	2	55	67	–12	5
Brazil	3	0	0	3	27	72	–45	3

21 January
9:00 CET (UTC+1)

Russia	15–10	Brazil
Try: Daria Noritsina 7' m Alena Tiron 11' m Baizat Khamidova 13' m	Report	Try: Andressa Alves 2' m Gabriela Lima 15' m

Estadio Ciudad de Málaga
Referee: Ashleigh Murray-Pretorius (South Africa)

21 January
9:22 CET (UTC+1)

France	33–16	England
Try: Coralie Bertrand (2) 1' c, 6' c Séraphine Okemba 8' c Jade Ulutule 11' c Yolaine Yengo 14' m Con: Jade Ulutule (4) 2', 7', 8', 12'	Report	Try: Abbie Brown 3' c Grace Crompton 5' m Megan Jones 11' m Con: Megan Jones 3'

Estadio Ciudad de Málaga
Referee: Julianne Zussman (Canada)

21 January
14:28 CET (UTC+1)

Russia	24–14	England
Try: Baizat Khamidova (2) 1' m, 14' m Viktoriia Em 3' c Daria Noritsina 9' c Con: Kristina Seredina (2) 4', 9'	Report	Try: Abi Burton 11' c Tatyana Heard 12' c Con: Megan Jones (2) 11', 13'

Estadio Ciudad de Málaga
Referee: Jaco De Wit (United Arab Emirates)

21 January
14:50 CET (UTC+1)

France	33–7	Brazil
Try: Joanna Grisez (3) 3' m, 5' c, 11' c Jade Ulutule 5' c Séraphine Okemba 7' c Con: Jade Ulutule (4) 5', 6', 8', 11'	Report	Try: Gabriela Lima 9' c Con: Raquel Kochhann 10'

Estadio Ciudad de Málaga
Referee: Katherine Ritchie (England)

22 January
9:00 CET (UTC+1)

Brazil	10–24	England
Try: Andressa Alves 8' m Gabriela Lima 15' m Cards: Leila dos Santos Silva (yellow card) 11'	Report	Try: Megan Jones 3' m Ellie Boatman 6' c Emma Uren 10' m Kelly Smith 12' c Con: Megan Jones (2) 6', 13'

Estadio Ciudad de Málaga
Referee: Ashleigh Murray-Pretorius (South Africa)

22 January
9:22 CET (UTC+1)

France	17–0	Russia
Try: Séraphine Okemba 6' c Jade Ulutule 8' m Yolaine Yengo 9' m Con: Jade Ulutule 6'	Report

Estadio Ciudad de Málaga
Referee: Jaco De Wit (United Arab Emirates)

==== Ranking of third-placed teams – Málaga ====
Team	Pld	W	D	L	PF	PA	PD	Pts
England	3	1	0	2	55	67	–12	5
Canada	2	0	0	2	21	39	–18	5 (Note: Canada received three points for a "bye" result against Fiji, whom couldn't contend the event due to "COVID-19 logistical challenges".)
Spain	3	1	0	2	31	60	–29	5

=== Knockout stage – Málaga ===
==== 9th–12th playoffs – Málaga ====
9th place Semi-finals
22 January – Estadio Ciudad de Málaga
Brazil	12
Belgium (a.e.t.)	17
22 January – Estadio Ciudad de Málaga
Spain	0
Fiji	0

9th place Final
23 January – Estadio Ciudad de Málaga
Belgium	5
Spain	17
11th place Final
23 January – Estadio Ciudad de Málaga
Brazil	0
Fiji	0

Matches

Semi-finals

22 January	Brazil	12–17 (a.e.t.)	Belgium	Estadio Ciudad de Málaga
16:21 CET (UTC+1)	Try: Leila dos Santos Silva 6' m Gabriela Lima 12' c Con: Raquel Kochhann 12'	Report	Try: Manon Nairac 3' c Margaux Stevins 10' m Ciska De Grave 16' m Con: Margaux Stevins 3'	Referee: Eki Fanlo (Spain)

22 January	Spain	0–0	Fiji	Estadio Ciudad de Málaga
16:43 CET (UTC+1)		Report

11th place Final

23 January	Brazil	0–0	Fiji	Estadio Ciudad de Málaga
10:58 CET (UTC+1)		Report

9th place Final

23 January	Belgium	5–17	Spain	Estadio Ciudad de Málaga
11:20 CET (UTC+1)	Try: Margaux Lalli 13' m Cards: Margaux Stevins (yellow card) 4'	Report	Try: Anne Fernández de Corres (2) 2' c, 7' m Amaia Erbina 9' m Con: Lea Ducher 3'; Cards: Lea Ducher (yellow card) 8'; María García (yellow card) 11'	Referee: Katherine Ritchie (England)

==== 5th–8th playoffs – Málaga ====
5th place Semi-finals
23 January – Estadio Ciudad de Málaga
England	7
Ireland	38
23 January – Estadio Ciudad de Málaga
Poland	7
Canada	26

5th place Final
23 January – Estadio Ciudad de Málaga
Ireland	26
Canada	5
7th place Final
23 January – Estadio Ciudad de Málaga
England	22
Poland	10

Matches

Semi-finals

23 January	England	7–38	Ireland	Estadio Ciudad de Málaga
9:30 CET (UTC+1)	Try: Megan Jones 8' c Con: Megan Jones 9'	Report	Try: Beibhinn Parsons (2) 3' c, 10' c Stacey Flood 5' m Eve Higgins 8' m Amee-Leigh Murphy Crowe (2) 9' c, 12' c Con: Lucy Mulhall (4) 3', 9', 11', 12'	Referee: Jaco De Wit (United Arab Emirates)

23 January	Poland	7–26	Canada	Estadio Ciudad de Málaga
9:52 CET (UTC+1)	Try: Natalia Pamieta 9' c Con: Natalia Pamieta 10'	Report	Try: Olivia Apps 7' c Nakisa Levale 10' c Paige Farries 11' c Emma Chown 14' m Con: Olivia Apps (2) 7', 11'; Breanne Nicholas 10'	Referee: Katherine Ritchie (England)

Seventh place

23 January	England	22–10	Poland	Estadio Ciudad de Málaga
15:23 CET (UTC+1)	Try: Alicia Maude 1' m Heather Cowell 5' c Ellie Boatman 7' m Grace Crompton 15' m Con: Isla Norman-Bell 6'	Report	Try: Małgorzata Kołdej 8' m Aleksandra Lachowski 12' m	Referee: Jaco De Wit (United Arab Emirates)

Fifth place

23 January	Ireland	26–5	Canada	Estadio Ciudad de Málaga
15:45 CET (UTC+1)	Try: Eve Higgins 4' c Amee-Leigh Murphy Crowe (3) 5' c, 10' c, 12' m Con: Lucy Mulhall (3) 4', 6', 11'; Cards: Amee-Leigh Murphy Crowe (yellow card) 9'	Report	Try: Olivia Apps 1' m Cards: Alysha Corrigan (yellow card) 10'	Referee: Katherine Ritchie (England)

==== Cup playoffs – Málaga ====
Quarter-finals
22 January – Estadio Ciudad de Málaga
United States	22
England	17
22 January – Estadio Ciudad de Málaga
France	33
Ireland	5
22 January – Estadio Ciudad de Málaga
Poland	5
Russia	26
22 January – Estadio Ciudad de Málaga
Australia	33
Canada	10

Semi-finals
23 January – Estadio Ciudad de Málaga
United States	14
France	10
23 January – Estadio Ciudad de Málaga
Russia	29
Australia	26

Cup Final
23 January – Estadio Ciudad de Málaga
United States	35
Russia	10
Third place
23 January – Estadio Ciudad de Málaga
France	7
Australia	33

Matches

Quarter-finals

22 January	United States	22–17	England	Estadio Ciudad de Málaga
14:53 CET (UTC+1)	Try: Jaz Gray 2' m Naya Tapper 6' c Ilona Maher 9' m Kris Thomas 10' m Con: Nicole Heavirland 6'; Cards: Kris Thomas (yellow card) 12'	Report	Try: Ellie Boatman 4' m Megan Jones 10' m Emma Uren 12' c Con: Megan Jones 12'; Cards: Kelly Smith (yellow card) 14'	Referee: Julianne Zussman (Canada)

22 January	France	33–5	Ireland	Estadio Ciudad de Málaga
15:15 CET (UTC+1)	Try: Camille Grassineau 4' c Yolaine Yengo 5' m Valentine Lothoz 7' c Séraphine Okemba 9' c Jade Ulutule 14' c Con: Jade Ulutule (4) 4', 8', 10', 15'	Report	Try: Beibhinn Parsons 2' m	Referee: Jaco De Wit (United Arab Emirates)

22 January	Poland	5–26	Russia	Estadio Ciudad de Málaga
15:37 CET (UTC+1)	Try: Julia Druzgała 1' m	Report	Try: Alena Tiron (3) 6' c, 9' c, 11' c Baizat Khamidova 13' m Con: Kristina Seredina (3) 6', 10', 11'	Referee: Katherine Ritchie (England)

22 January	Australia	33–10	Canada	Estadio Ciudad de Málaga
15:59 CET (UTC+1)	Try: Madison Ashby 2' c Charlotte Caslick 6' c Tia Hinds 8' c Maddison Levi (2) 11' c, 15' m Con: Tia Hinds (4) 3', 6', 8', 12'	Report	Try: Paige Farries 10' m Sabrina Poulin 14' m	Referee: Ashleigh Murray-Pretorius (South Africa)

Semi-finals

23 January	United States	14–10	France	Estadio Ciudad de Málaga
10:14 CET (UTC+1)	Try: Kayla Canett 3' c Kris Thomas 6' c Con: Alena Olsen (2) 3', 7'	Report	Try: Carla Neisen 5' m Jade Ulutule 10' m Cards: Valentine Lothoz (yellow card) 8'	Referee: Julianne Zussman (Canada)

23 January	Russia	29–26	Australia	Estadio Ciudad de Málaga
10:36 CET (UTC+1)	Try: Baizat Khamidova 1' c Alena Tiron 5' m Kristina Seredina (2) 8' m, 9' c Viktoriia Em 12' m Con: Kristina Seredina (2) 2', 9'; Cards: Daria Shestakova (yellow card) 14'	Report	Try: Alysia Lefau-Fakaosilea 3' c Demi Hayes 7' c Maddison Levi 10' c Madison Ashby 14' m Con: Tia Hinds (3) 3', 7', 10'	Referee: Ashleigh Murray-Pretorius (South Africa)

Third place

23 January	France	7–33	Australia	Estadio Ciudad de Málaga
17:37 CET (UTC+1)	Try: Jade Ulutule 8' c Con: Jade Ulutule 8'	Report	Try: Faith Nathan (2) 1' c, 8' m Maddison Levi 4' c Dominique du Toit 12' c Lily Dick 12' c Con: Tia Hinds (2) 2', 4'; Dominique du Toit (2) 12', 13'	Referee: Ashleigh Murray-Pretorius (South Africa)

Cup Final

23 January	United States	35–10	Russia	Estadio Ciudad de Málaga
18:26 CET (UTC+1)	Try: Kris Thomas 1' c Naya Tapper 4' c Jaz Gray (2) 9' c, 13' c Ilona Maher 14' c Con: Nicole Heavirland (5) 2', 4', 10', 13', 15'	Report	Try: Baizat Khamidova 3' m Snezhanna Kulkova 9' m Cards: Daria Shestakova (yellow card) 11'	Referee: Julianne Zussman (Canada)

=== Placings – Málaga ===
Place	Team	Points
1st place, gold medalist(s)	United States	20
2nd place, silver medalist(s)	Russia	18
3rd place, bronze medalist(s)	Australia	16
4	France	14
5	Ireland	12
6	Canada	10
7	England	8
8	Poland	6
9	Spain	4
10	Belgium	3
11	Brazil	2
12	Fiji	1

Source: World Rugby

== Seville ==
=== Pool stage – Seville ===
The draw for the pool stage of the Seville Sevens was announced via Twitter on 24 January.

==== Pool A – Seville ====
Team	Pld	W	D	L	PF	PA	PD	Pts
United States	3	3	0	0	90	17	+73	9
England	3	2	0	1	89	36	+53	7
Canada	3	1	0	2	64	54	+10	5
Portugal	3	0	0	3	7	143	–136	3

28 January
12:44 CET (UTC+1)

Canada	12–33	England
Try: Elissa Alarie 9' c Alysha Corrigan 10' m Con: Breanne Nicholas 9'	Report	Try: Grace Crompton 1' m Ellie Boatman 4' c Heather Cowell 8' c Emma Uren 12' m Megan Jones 15' c Con: Megan Jones (4) 4', 9', 13', 16'

Estadio de La Cartuja
Referee: Ashleigh Murray-Pretorius (South Africa)

28 January
13:06 CET (UTC+1)

United States	52–0	Portugal
Try: Sarah Levy (2) 1' m, 11' c Jaz Gray (3) 3' c, 6' c, 8' m Sui A'au 5' c Alex Sedrick 9' c Kristi Kirshe 15' c Con: Kayla Canett (4) 3', 5', 6', 9'; Alena Olsen 12'; Nicole Heavirland 15'	Report

Estadio de La Cartuja
Referee: Katherine Ritchie (England)

28 January
18:37 CET (UTC+1)

Canada	45–7	Portugal
Try: Elissa Alarie 1' c Nakisa Levale 4' m Paige Farries (2) 8' m, 10' c Olivia Apps 13' c Chloe Daniels 14' c Penalty try 15' m Con: Chloe Daniels 2'; Olivia Apps (3) 10', 13', 14'	Report	Try: Isabel Ozório 6' c Con: Daniela Correia 7'; Cards: Maria João Costa (yellow card) 15'

Estadio de La Cartuja
Referee: Jaco De Wit (United Arab Emirates)

28 January
19:05 CET (UTC+1)

United States	24–10	England
Try: Naya Tapper 5' c Lauren Doyle 9' c Jaz Gray 9' m Kris Thomas 10' m Con: Nicole Heavirland 6'; Kayla Canett 9'	Report	Try: Grace Crompton 3' m Isla Norman-Bell 7' m

Estadio de La Cartuja
Referee: Julianne Zussman (Canada)

29 January
12:35 CET (UTC+1)

England	46–0	Portugal
Try: Heather Cowell (3) 1' m, 5' m, 15' m Abbie Brown 3' c Ellie Boatman (4) 7' c, 8' c, 10' m, 14' m Con: Isla Norman-Bell (3) 3', 7', 8'	Report

Estadio de La Cartuja
Referee: Jaco De Wit (United Arab Emirates)

29 January
12:57 CET (UTC+1)

United States	14–7	Canada
Try: Sui A'au 1' m Kristi Kirshe 9' c Con: Alena Olsen 2'; Nicole Heavirland 10'	Report	Try: Olivia De Couvreur 3' c Con: Breanne Nicholas 4'

Estadio de La Cartuja
Referee: Ashleigh Murray-Pretorius (South Africa)

==== Pool B – Seville ====
Team	Pld	W	D	L	PF	PA	PD	Pts
Ireland	3	3	0	0	64	36	+28	9
Russia	3	2	0	1	69	33	+36	7
Brazil	3	1	0	2	36	70	–34	5
Poland	3	0	0	3	30	60	–30	3

28 January
12:00 CET (UTC+1)

Ireland	14–10	Poland
Try: Amee-Leigh Murphy Crowe 5' c, 15' c Con: Lucy Mulhall (2) 5', 15'; Cards: Eve Higgins (yellow card) 8'	Report	Try: Anna Klichowska 7' m Tamara Czumer 12' m

Estadio de La Cartuja
Referee: Julianne Zussman (Canada)

28 January
12:22 CET (UTC+1)

Russia	26–7	Brazil
Try: Baizat Khamidova 4' c Viktoriia Em 6' c Daria Shestakova 9' c Alena Tiron 12' m Con: Kristina Seredina (3) 4', 7', 10'	Report	Try: Leila dos Santos Silva 8' c Con: Raquel Kochhann 9'; Cards: Leila dos Santos Silva (yellow card) 8'

Estadio de La Cartuja
Referee: Jaco De Wit (United Arab Emirates)

28 January
17:38 CET (UTC+1)

Ireland	29–12	Brazil
Try: Stacey Flood 1' m Beibhinn Parsons 3' m Eve Higgins 7' c Amee-Leigh Murphy Crowe 13' c Lucy Mulhall 15' m Con: Lucy Mulhall (2) 7', 14'	Report	Try: Raquel Kochhann 5' c Bianca Silva 9' m Con: Raquel Kochhann 6'; Cards: Mariana Nicolau (yellow card) 3'; Raquel Kochhann (yellow card) 14'

Estadio de La Cartuja
Referee: Gianluca Gnecchi (Italy)

28 January
18:00 CET (UTC+1)

Russia	29–5	Poland
Try: Viktoriia Em 1' c Kristina Seredina (2) 6' m, 7' m Alena Tiron 8' m Daria Shestakova 14' c Con: Kristina Seredina 1'; Snezhanna Kulkova 14'	Report	Try: Anna Klichowska 4' m

Estadio de La Cartuja
Referee: Eki Fanlo (Spain)

29 January
11:51 CET (UTC+1)

Poland	15–17	Brazil
Try: Małgorzata Kołdej (2) 6' m, 14' m Hanna Maliszewska 9' m Cards: Julia Druzgała (yellow card) 15'	Report	Try: Gabriela Lima 1' c Thalia Costa (2) 8' m, 12' m Con: Raquel Kochhann 2'; Cards: Raquel Kochhann (yellow card) 10'

Estadio de La Cartuja
Referee: Eki Fanlo (Spain)

29 January
12:13 CET (UTC+1)

Russia	14–21	Ireland
Try: Alena Tiron 6' c Viktoriia Em 8' c Con: Kristina Seredina (2) 7', 9'	Report	Try: Eve Higgins 1' c Amee-Leigh Murphy Crowe 10' c Kate Farrell McCabe 15' c Con: Lucy Mulhall (3) 2', 10', 15'

Estadio de La Cartuja
Referee: Julianne Zussman (Canada)

==== Pool C – Seville ====
Team	Pld	W	D	L	PF	PA	PD	Pts
France	3	3	0	0	100	10	+90	9
Australia	3	2	0	1	74	19	+55	7
Spain	3	1	0	2	36	69	–33	5
Belgium	3	0	0	3	0	112	–112	3

28 January
13:28 CET (UTC+1)

France	43–0	Spain
Try: Joanna Grisez (3) 3' m, 5' m, 9' c Anne-Cécile Ciofani (2) 7' c, 11' m Jade Ulutule 8' c Yolaine Yengo 14' c Con: Jade Ulutule (3) 8', 8', 10'; Yolaine Yengo 14'	Report

Estadio de La Cartuja
Referee: Adam Leal (England)

28 January
13:50 CET (UTC+1)

Australia	38–0	Belgium
Try: Tia Hinds 3' c Faith Nathan 5' m Lily Dick 7' c Madison Ashby 9' c Dominique du Toit 11' m Charlotte Caslick 13' c Con: Tia Hinds (2) 3', 8'; Dominique du Toit 10'; Sharni Williams 13'	Report	Cards: Ciska De Grave (yellow card) 6'

Estadio de La Cartuja
Referee: Jeremy Rozier (France)

28 January
19:35 CET (UTC+1)

France	45–0	Belgium
Try: Coralie Bertrand 3' c Ian Jason (2) 7' c, 9' c Valentine Lothoz 10' m Joanna Grisez 13' c Chloé Jacquet 14' c Lou Noel 15' m Con: Jade Ulutule (3) 3', 7', 9'; Montserrat Amedee 13', 15'	Report

Estadio de La Cartuja
Referee: Ashleigh Murray-Pretorius (South Africa)

28 January
20:03 CET (UTC+1)

Australia	26–7	Spain
Try: Alysia Lefau-Fakaosilea 3' c Faith Nathan (2) 6' c, 12' m Dominique du Toit 8' c Con: Tia Hinds (3) 3', 6', 9'	Report	Try: Eva Aguirre Diaz 5' c Con: Lea Ducher 5'

Estadio de La Cartuja
Referee: Katherine Ritchie (England)

29 January
13:19 CET (UTC+1)

Spain	29–0	Belgium
Try: Eva Aguirre Diaz 3' c Lea Ducher (2) 6' m, 14' m Anne Fernández de Corres 9' m Bruna Elias 11' c Con: Lea Ducher (2) 4', 12'; Cards: Paula Requena (yellow card) 7'	Report

Estadio de La Cartuja
Referee: Katherine Ritchie (England)

29 January
13:41 CET (UTC+1)

Australia	10–12	France
Try: Charlotte Caslick 2' m Faith Nathan 10' m	Report	Try: Chloé Pelle 6' c Anne-Cécile Ciofani 13' m Con: Jade Ulutule 6'; Cards: Camille Grassineau (yellow card) 8'

Estadio de La Cartuja
Referee: Finlay Brown (Scotland)

==== Ranking of third-placed teams – Seville ====
Team	Pld	W	D	L	PF	PA	PD	Pts
Canada	3	1	0	2	64	54	+10	5
Spain	3	1	0	2	36	69	–33	5
Brazil	3	1	0	2	36	70	–34	5

=== Knockout stage – Seville ===
==== 9th–12th playoffs – Seville ====
9th place Semi-finals
30 January – Estadio de La Cartuja
Poland	24
Belgium	0
30 January – Estadio de La Cartuja
Brazil	47
Portugal	5

9th place Final
30 January – Estadio de La Cartuja
Poland	5
Brazil	17
11th place Final
30 January – Estadio de La Cartuja
Belgium	40
Portugal	7

Matches

Semi-finals

30 January	Poland	24–0	Belgium	Estadio de La Cartuja
9:00 CET (UTC+1)	Try: Małgorzata Kołdej 4' m Karolina Jaszczyszyn (2) 6' m, 8' c Patrycja Zawadzka 10' c Con: Karolina Jaszczyszyn (2) 9', 11'	Report		Referee: Eki Fanlo (Spain)

30 January	Brazil	47–5	Portugal	Estadio de La Cartuja
9:22 CET (UTC+1)	Try: Mariana Nicolau 1' m Bianca Silva (2) 2' c, 7' c Edna Santini 6' c Gabriela Lima 8' c Thalia Costa 14' c Andressa Alves 16' m Con: Raquel Kochhann (6) 2', 3', 6', 8', 9', 15'; Cards: Andressa Alves (yellow card) 9'	Report	Try: Mariana Marques 10' m	Referee: Katherine Ritchie (England)

11th place Final

30 January	Belgium	40–7	Portugal	Estadio de La Cartuja
12:16 CET (UTC+1)	Try: Shari Claes 3' c Cecile Blondiau 5' c Ciska De Grave 7' c Louise Liegeois 9' m Ella Amory 10' c Emilie Musch 13' c Con: Margaux Stevins (5) 3', 5', 7', 10', 13'; Cards: Heloise Stevins (yellow card) 1'	Report	Try: Yara Fonseca 11' c Con: Daniela Correia 12'	Referee: Jaco De Wit (United Arab Emirates)

9th place Final

30 January	Poland	5–17	Brazil	Estadio de La Cartuja
12:38 CET (UTC+1)	Try: Małgorzata Kołdej 5' m	Report	Try: Gabriela Lima 10' c Raquel Kochhann 12' m Thalia Costa 15' m Con: Raquel Kochhann 10'	Referee: Ashleigh Murray-Pretorius (South Africa)

==== 5th–8th playoffs – Seville ====
5th place Semi-finals
30 January – Estadio de La Cartuja
Canada	0
France	29
30 January – Estadio de La Cartuja
Russia	28
Spain	0

5th place Final
30 January – Estadio de La Cartuja
France	26
Russia	10
7th place Final
30 January – Estadio de La Cartuja
Canada	21
Spain	5

Matches

Semi-finals

30 January	Canada	0–29	France	Estadio de La Cartuja
11:32 CET (UTC+1)	Cards: Elissa Alarie (yellow card) 6'; Breanne Nicholas (yellow card) 9'; Pamphinette Buisa (yellow card) 11'	Report	Try: Camille Grassineau (2) 3' m, 7' m Lou Noel 6' c Chloé Pelle 9' m Anne-Cécile Ciofani 14' c Con: Montserrat Amedee 7'; Chloé Jacquet 14'	Referee: Eki Fanlo (Spain)

30 January	Russia	28–0	Spain	Estadio de La Cartuja
11:54 CET (UTC+1)	Try: Elena Zdrokova 3' c Daria Noritsina 5' c Viktoriia Em 8' c Alena Tiron 13' c Con: Snezhanna Kulkova (4) 3', 6', 8', 13'	Report		Referee: Julianne Zussman (Canada)

Seventh place

30 January	Canada	21–5	Spain	Estadio de La Cartuja
17:00 CET (UTC+1)	Try: Pamphinette Buisa 8' c Paige Farries 10' c Sabrina Poulin 13' c Con: Breanne Nicholas (2) 8', 13'; Olivia Apps 10'	Report	Try: María García 8' m	Referee: Katherine Ritchie (England)

Fifth place

30 January	France	26–10	Russia	Estadio de La Cartuja
17:22 CET (UTC+1)	Try: Jade Ulutule 6' c Anne-Cécile Ciofani 7' m Camille Grassineau 11' c Ian Jason 12' c Con: Jade Ulutule (3) 6', 11', 12'	Report	Try: Viktoriia Em 2' m Nadezhda Sozonova 4' m	Referee: Eki Fanlo (Spain)

==== Cup playoffs – Seville ====
Quarter-finals
29 January – Estadio de La Cartuja
Ireland	36
Canada	12
29 January – Estadio de La Cartuja
France	12
England	21
29 January – Estadio de La Cartuja
Russia	0
Australia	41
29 January – Estadio de La Cartuja
United States	15
Spain	0

Semi-finals
30 January – Estadio de La Cartuja
Ireland	29
England	0
30 January – Estadio de La Cartuja
Australia	21
United States	19

Cup Final
30 January – Estadio de La Cartuja
Ireland	12
Australia	17
Third place
30 January – Estadio de La Cartuja
England	19
United States	12

Matches

Quarter-finals

29 January	Ireland	36–12	Canada	Estadio de La Cartuja
17:14 CET (UTC+1)	Try: Eve Higgins (2) 1' c, 9' c Amee-Leigh Murphy Crowe (3) 4' m, 7' m, 12' m Lucy Mulhall 6' m Con: Lucy Mulhall (3) 1', 9', 13'	Report	Try: Elissa Alarie 11' m Olivia Apps 15' c Con: Olivia Apps 15'; Cards: Chloe Daniels (yellow card) 3'	Referee: Ashleigh Murray-Pretorius (South Africa)

29 January	France	12–21	England	Estadio de La Cartuja
17:36 CET (UTC+1)	Try: Valentine Lothoz 8' c Lou Noel 13' m Con: Jade Ulutule 9'	Report	Try: Megan Jones (2) 6' c, 11' c Emma Uren 9' c Con: Megan Jones (3) 6', 9', 12'	Referee: Julianne Zussman (Canada)

29 January	Russia	0–41	Australia	Estadio de La Cartuja
17:58 CET (UTC+1)	Cards: Anna Baranchuk (yellow card) 3'	Report	Try: Sharni Williams (2) 2' c, 4' m Alysia Lefau-Fakaosilea 7' c Madison Ashby 10' c Teagan Levi 11' m Dominique du Toit 13' m Charlotte Caslick 15' m Con: Tia Hinds (3) 2', 7', 10'	Referee: Eki Fanlo (Spain)

29 January	United States	15–0	Spain	Estadio de La Cartuja
18:20 CET (UTC+1)	Try: Kris Thomas 1' m Jaz Gray (2) 3' m, 14' m	Report		Referee: Katherine Ritchie (England)

Semi-finals

30 January	Ireland	29–0	England	Estadio de La Cartuja
15:22 CET (UTC+1)	Try: Amee-Leigh Murphy Crowe (2) 2' m, 6' m Lucy Mulhall 4' m Beibhinn Parsons (2) 8' c, 13' c Con: Lucy Mulhall (2) 9', 13'	Report	Cards: Abbie Brown (yellow card) 14'	Referee: Jaco De Wit (United Arab Emirates)

30 January	Australia	21–19	United States	Estadio de La Cartuja
15:44 CET (UTC+1)	Try: Tia Hinds 2' c Faith Nathan 8' c Maddison Levi 11' c Con: Tia Hinds (3) 3', 9', 11'	Report	Try: Kris Thomas 4' c Jaz Gray 6' c Naya Tapper 13' m Con: Kayla Canett 4'; Nicole Heavirland 7'; Cards: Cheta Emba (yellow card) 8'; Kayla Canett (yellow card) 11'	Referee: Ashleigh Murray-Pretorius (South Africa)

Third place

30 January	England	19–12	United States	Estadio de La Cartuja
19:07 CET (UTC+1)	Try: Ellie Boatman 3' c Emma Uren 9' c Heather Cowell 11' m Con: Megan Jones (2) 4', 9'	Report	Try: Kris Thomas (2) 2' c, 4' m Con: Nicole Heavirland 2'	Referee: Jaco De Wit (United Arab Emirates)

Cup Final

30 January	Ireland	12–17	Australia	Estadio de La Cartuja
19:56 CET (UTC+1)	Try: Beibhinn Parsons 2' c Stacey Flood 4' m Con: Lucy Mulhall 2'	Report	Try: Faith Nathan (2) 7' m, 15' c Dominique du Toit 12' c Con: Sharni Williams 13'	Referee: Julianne Zussman (Canada)

=== Placings – Seville ===
Place	Team	Points
1st place, gold medalist(s)	Australia	20
2nd place, silver medalist(s)	Ireland	18
3rd place, bronze medalist(s)	England	16
4	United States	14
5	France	12
6	Russia	10

Place	Team	Points
7	Canada	8
8	Spain	6
9	Brazil	4
10	Poland	3
11	Belgium	2
12	Portugal	1

Source: World Rugby

== See also ==
- 2022 Spain Sevens (for men)

Women's Sevens Series IX
Preceded by 2021 Dubai	2022 Spain Women's Sevens	Succeeded by 2022 Langford
Spain Women's Sevens
Preceded by None (first event)	2022 Spain Women's Sevens	Succeeded by To be determined
