= 2022 Canada Women's Sevens =

- Women's Sevens Series IX
- Host nation: Canada
- Date: 30 April – 1 May 2022

Cup
- Champion: Australia
- Runner-up: New Zealand
- Third: Ireland

Tournament details
- Matches played: 34
- Tries scored: 210 (average 6.18 per match)
- Most points: Amee-Leigh Murphy Crowe (60 points)
- Most tries: Amee-Leigh Murphy Crowe (12 tries)

The 2022 Canada Women's Sevens was rugby sevens tournament for women's national teams that took place between 30 April and 1 May 2022 at Starlight Stadium, Langford, British Columbia, Canada as part of the 2021–22 World Rugby Women's Sevens Series. The defending champions from the 2019 Sevens Series event were New Zealand.

In their third Langford Final appearance, first-time Langford champions Australia beat New Zealand 21–17 in the Final, a rematch of the 2018 and 2019 events. Hosts Canada beat the United States to finish fifth (12–7). It is their third back-to-back fifth placing at home. Ireland finished third, beating France 22–14. It is their first top four placing in Langford, and their first back-to-back top three placement on the World Rugby Women's Sevens Series.

== Format ==
The twelve teams are drawn into three pools of four. Each team will play their other three opponents in their pool once. The top two teams from each pool advance to the Cup bracket, with the two best third-placed teams also advancing. The remaining four teams will compete for a 9th–12th placing.

== Teams ==
The twelve national women's teams competing in Canada were:

- Australia
- Brazil
- Canada
- England
- Fiji
- France
- Ireland
- Japan
- Mexico
- New Zealand
- Spain
- United States

• Fiji returned to the 2021–22 series after their absence since the Dubai II event.

• Japan was an invited team for the tournament and made their first appearance on the World Series since the 2020 Sydney Sevens.

• New Zealand also returned to the World Series for the first time since the 2020 Sydney Sevens, an absence of 2 years, 87 days.

• Mexico was invited to replace Russia who were banned by World Rugby. Mexico's previous World Series appearance was at the 2018 USA Sevens.

== Pool stage ==
The final pool composition was announced on 10 March.

=== Pool A ===
Team	Pld	W	D	L	PF	PA	PD	Pts
Australia	3	3	0	0	110	12	+98	9
Canada	3	2	0	1	67	38	+29	7
Spain	3	1	0	2	70	43	+27	5
Mexico	3	0	0	3	0	154	–154	3

30 April
10:58 PDT (UTC–7)

Canada	19–10	Spain
Try: Keyara Wardley (2) 4' c, 12' m Bianca Farella 9' c Con: Breanne Nicholas (2) 5', 9'; Cards: Elissa Alarie (yellow card)	Report	Try: Maria Calvo 6' m Lea Ducher 8' m

Starlight Stadium
Referee: Cisco Lopez (United States)

30 April
11:20 PDT (UTC–7)

Australia	58–0	Mexico
Try: Demi Hayes (2) 1' m, 4' m Faith Nathan 3' m Charlotte Caslick 6' c Sariah Paki (2) 7' m, 15' c Jakiya Whitfeld (2) 8' m, 13' c Bienne Terita 10' m Jesse Southwell 12' c Con: Sharni Williams 6'; Jesse Southwell (3) 12', 14', 15'	Report

Starlight Stadium
Referee: Selica Winiata (New Zealand)

30 April
14:02 PDT (UTC–7)

Canada	43–0	Mexico
Try: Fancy Bermudez Chavez 1' m Krissy Scurfield (2) 4' m, 8' c Bianca Farella 6' c Renee Gonzalez 9' c Elissa Alarie 12' m Florence Symonds 15' c Con: Olivia Apps (3) 7', 9', 9'; Asia Hogan-Rochester 15'	Report

Starlight Stadium
Referee: Tyler Miller (Australia)

30 April
14:24 PDT (UTC–7)

Australia	24–7	Spain
Try: Maddison Levi 1' m, 4' c Charlotte Caslick 8' c, 11' m Con: Sharni Williams 4'; Jesse Southwell 9'	Report	Try: Lea Ducher 14' c Con: Lea Ducher 15'

Starlight Stadium
Referee: Julianne Zussman (Canada)

30 April
17:35 PDT (UTC–7)

Spain	53–0	Mexico
Try: Paula Requena (2) 1' c, 9' c Amalia Argudo 4' c María García 5' m Lea Ducher (2) 7' m, 15' m Bruna Elias 10' c Iciar Pozo Eizaguirre 11' m Marta Cantabrana Gil 13' m Con: Lea Ducher (4) 1', 4', 9', 10'	Report	Cards: Yazmin Ramirez (yellow card)

Starlight Stadium
Referee: Lauren Jenner (New Zealand)

30 April
18:03 PDT (UTC–7)

Australia	28–5	Canada
Try: Charlotte Caslick 8' c Demi Hayes 8' c Maddison Levi (2) 10' c, 11' c Con: Dominique du Toit (3) 4', 8', 10'; Sharni Williams 12'	Report	Try: Olivia De Couvreur 16' m

Starlight Stadium
Referee: Eki Fanlo (Spain)

=== Pool B ===
Team	Pld	W	D	L	PF	PA	PD	Pts
France	3	3	0	0	88	27	+61	9
Ireland	3	2	0	1	65	49	+16	7
Brazil	3	1	0	2	62	62	+0	5
Japan	3	0	0	3	24	101	–77	3

30 April
10:14 PDT (UTC–7)

France	19–10	Brazil
Try: Shannon Izar 5' c Coralie Bertrand (2) 7' m, 10' c Con: Jade Ulutule (2) 6', 10'	Report	Try: Thalia Costa 14' c Con: Raquel Kochhann 14'; Pen: Raquel Kochhann 16'

Starlight Stadium
Referee: Lauren Jenner (New Zealand)

30 April
10:36 PDT (UTC–7)

Ireland	22–7	Japan
Try: Amee-Leigh Murphy Crowe (3) 2' m, 4' c, 6' m Kate Farrell McCabe 14' m Con: Lucy Muolhall 4'; Cards: Erin King (yellow card)	Report	Try: Hana Nagata 10' c Con: Hana Nagata 10'

Starlight Stadium
Referee: Eki Fanlo (Spain)

30 April
13:18 PDT (UTC–7)

France	41–5	Japan
Try: Coralie Bertrand 1' m Shannon Izar 2' c Carla Neisen 4' c Yolaine Yengo (2) 6' m, 8' m Camille Grassineau 13' m Séraphine Okemba 15' c Con: Jade Ulutule (2) 3', 4'; Yolaine Yengo 16'	Report	Try: Hana Nagata 14' m

Starlight Stadium
Referee: Selica Winiata (New Zealand)

30 April
13:40 PDT (UTC–7)

Ireland	31–14	Brazil
Try: Amee-Leigh Murphy Crowe (3) 2' m, 6' c, 8' c Eve Higgins 11' c Beibhinn Parsons 14' m Con: Lucy Mulhall (3) 6', 9', 11'	Report	Try: Thalia Costa 3' c Gabriela Lima 12' c Con: Raquel Kochhann (2) 3', 13'

Starlight Stadium
Referee: Cisco Lopez (United States)

30 April
16:37 PDT (UTC–7)

Brazil	38–12	Japan
Try: Thalia Costa (3) 1' c, 9' c, 10' m Bianca Silva 7' c Rafaela Zanellato 10' m Gabriela Lima 12' c Con: Raquel Kochhann (4) 1', 7', 9', 13'	Report	Try: Wakaba Hara 6' m Chiaki Saegusa 14' c Con: Yume Hirano 15'

Starlight Stadium
Referee: Tyler Miller (Australia)

30 April
17:05 PDT (UTC–7)

Ireland	12–28	France
Try: Amee-Leigh Murphy Crowe 2' m Vicki Elmes Kinlan 13' c Con: Lucy Mulhall 14'; Cards: Katie Heffernan (yellow card)	Report	Try: Séraphine Okemba (2) 1' c, 4' c Chloé Pelle 7' m Lou Noel 9' c Con: Jade Ulutule (3) 1', 5', 15'; Shannon Izar 10'

Starlight Stadium
Referee: Julianne Zussman (Canada)

=== Pool C ===
Team	Pld	W	D	L	PF	PA	PD	Pts
New Zealand	3	2	1	0	79	12	+67	8
United States	3	2	0	1	51	79	–28	7
Fiji	3	1	1	1	69	37	+32	6
England	3	0	0	3	29	100	–71	3

30 April
9:30 PDT (UTC–7)

United States	20–19	Fiji
Try: Kris Thomas 1' m Ilona Maher 4' m Kayla Canett 9' m Jaz Gray 12' m	Report	Try: Reapi Ulunisau 8' c Alowesi Nakoci (2) 10' m, 13' c Con: Lavena Cavuru 8'; Viniana Riwai 13'

Starlight Stadium
Referee: Julianne Zussman (Canada)

30 April
9:52 PDT (UTC–7)

England	0–31	New Zealand
	Report	Try: Stacey Fluhler 4' m Risi Pouri-Lane 7' m Kelly Brazier 11' c Portia Woodman 12' c Michaela Blyde 15' c Con: Risi Pouri-Lane 11'; Tyla Nathan-Wong (2) 13', 15'

Starlight Stadium
Referee: Tyler Miller (Australia)

30 April
12:34 PDT (UTC–7)

United States	0–36	New Zealand
	Report	Try: Michaela Blyde (2) 2' c, 5' m Tyla Nathan-Wong 7' m Portia Woodman (2) 8' c, 13' m Shiray Kaka 14' c Con: Tyla Nathan-Wong (3) 2', 8', 15'

Starlight Stadium
Referee: Eki Fanlo (Spain)

30 April
12:56 PDT (UTC–7)

England	5–38	Fiji
Try: Grace Compton 9' m	Report	Try: Ana Maria Naimasi 2' c Reapi Ulunisau 4' m Vasiti Solikoviti 6' c Alowesi Nakoci 10' c Mereula Torooti 13' c Laisana Likuceva 15' m Con: Viniana Riwai (2) 3', 7'; Ana Maria Naimasi 11'; Lavena Cavuru 13'

Starlight Stadium
Referee: Lauren Jenner (New Zealand)

30 April
15:38 PDT (UTC–7)

Fiji	12–12	New Zealand
Try: Raijieli Daveua 11' c Alowesi Nakoci 13' m Con: Lavena Cavuru 11'	Report	Try: Michaela Blyde 7' m Portia Woodman 15' c Con: Risi Pouri-Lane 16'; Cards: Kelly Brazier (yellow card)

Starlight Stadium
Referee: Cisco Lopez (United States)

30 April
16:00 PDT (UTC–7)

England	24–31	United States
Try: Grace Crompton 5' c Heather Cowell 7' m Emma Uren (2) 11' c, 14' m Con: Alicia Maude 5'; Isla Norman-Bell 11'	Report	Try: Kris Thomas 1' m Jaz Gray 3' c Cheta Emba 8' c Ilona Maher 10' m Sarah Levy 13' c Con: Nicole Heavirland 3'; Alena Olsen (2) 8', 13'

Starlight Stadium
Referee: Selica Winiata (New Zealand)

=== Ranking of third-placed teams ===
Team	Pld	W	D	L	PF	PA	PD	Pts
Fiji	3	1	1	1	69	37	+32	6
Spain	3	1	0	2	70	43	+27	5
Brazil	3	1	0	2	62	62	+0	5

== Knockout stage ==
=== 9th–12th playoffs ===
9th place Semi-finals
1 May – Starlight Stadium
Brazil	34
Mexico	5
1 May – Starlight Stadium
England	29
Japan	7

9th place Final
1 May – Starlight Stadium
Brazil	24
England	7
11th place Final
1 May – Starlight Stadium
Mexico	0
Japan	45

Matches

Semi-finals

1 May	Brazil	34–5	Mexico	Starlight Stadium
11:28 PDT (UTC–7)	Try: Thalia Costa (2) 1' m, 4' m Gabriela Lima 2' c Rafaela Zanellato 6' c Camilla Carvalo 8' m Bianca Silva 13' m Con: Raquel Kochhann (2) 3', 7'; Cards: Luiza Campos (yellow card)	Report	Try: Zoe Tuyú 11' m	Referee: Eki Fanlo (Spain)

1 May	England	29–7	Japan	Starlight Stadium
11:50 PDT (UTC–7)	Try: Jade Shekells (2) 1' c, 6' c Ellie Boatman 10' m Abi Burton 12' m Heather Cowell 15' m Con: Alicia Maude 2'; Isla Norman-Bell 7'; Cards: Jade Shekells (yellow card)	Report	Try: Wakaba Hara 8' c Con: Hana Nagata 8'	Referee: Tyler Miller (Australia)

11th place Final

1 May	Mexico	0–45	Japan	Starlight Stadium
14:34 PDT (UTC–7)		Report	Try: Mei Otani 2' c Marin Kajiki 4' c Yume Hirano 5' c Hana Nagata (2) 8' c, 16' m Chiaki Saegusa 9' m Sakurako Yazaki 14' c Con: Hana Nagata (4) 2', 5', 6', 8'; Misaki Matsumura 15'	Referee: Shanda Assmus (Canada)

9th place Final

1 May	Brazil	24–7	England	Starlight Stadium
14:56 PDT (UTC–7)	Try: Mariana Nicolau 1' m Rafaela Zanellato 2' c Bianca Silva 6' m Thalia Costa 13' c Con: Raquel Kochhann (2) 3', 14'	Report	Try: Emma Uren 11' c Con: Isla Norman-Bell 11'	Referee: Kat Roche (United States)

=== 5th–8th playoffs ===
5th place Semi-finals
1 May – Starlight Stadium
Fiji	19
Canada	26
1 May – Starlight Stadium
United States	17
Spain	0

5th place Final
1 May – Starlight Stadium
Canada	12
United States	7
7th place Final
1 May – Starlight Stadium
Fiji	26
Spain	7

Matches

Semi-finals

1 May	Fiji	19–26	Canada	Starlight Stadium
13:06 PDT (UTC–7)	Try: Reapi Ulunisau (2) 4' c, 7' c Sesenieli Donu 8' m Con: Lavena Cavuru (2) 5', 8'; Cards: Lavena Cavuru (yellow card)	Report	Try: Keyara Wardley 2' c Krissy Scurfield (2) 6' c, 13' c Florence Symonds 10' m Con: Breanne Nicholas (2) 2', 13'; Olivia Apps 6'	Referee: Selica Winiata (New Zealand)

1 May	United States	17–0	Spain	Starlight Stadium
13:28 PDT (UTC–7)	Try: Ilona Maher 3' m Kristi Kirshe 8' c Sarah Levy 12' m Con: Alena Olsen 9'	Report		Referee: Julianne Zussman (Canada)

7th place Final

1 May	Fiji	26–7	Spain	Starlight Stadium
15:37 PDT (UTC–7)	Try: Alowesi Nakoci (2) 4' c, 15' c Raijieli Daveua 8' c Reapi Ulunisau 10' m Con: Viniana Riwai (2) 5', 8'; Lavena Cavuru 15'	Report	Try: Lea Ducher 8' c Con: Lea Ducher 9'; Cards: Marta Cantabrana Gil (yellow card) 13' to 15'; Olivia Fresneda (yellow card) 14' to 16'	Referee: Cisco Lopez (United States)

5th place Final

1 May	Canada	12–7	United States	Starlight Stadium
16:01 PDT (UTC–7)	Try: Florence Symonds 4' m Keyara Wardley 7' c Con: Olivia Apps 8'; Cards: Krissy Scurfield (yellow card) 9' to 11'	Report	Try: Kristi Kirshe 9' c Con: Alena Olsen 9'	Referee: Tyler Miller (Australia)

=== Cup playoffs ===
Quarter-finals
1 May – Starlight Stadium
France	31
Fiji	14
1 May – Starlight Stadium
New Zealand	38
Canada	0
1 May – Starlight Stadium
Ireland	17
United States	14
1 May – Starlight Stadium
Australia	55
Spain	0

Semi-finals
1 May – Starlight Stadium
France	14
New Zealand	26
1 May – Starlight Stadium
Ireland	5
Australia	26

Cup Final
1 May – Starlight Stadium
New Zealand	17
Australia	21
Third place
1 May – Starlight Stadium
France	14
Ireland	22

Matches

Quarter-finals

1 May	France	31–14	Fiji	Starlight Stadium
10:00 PDT (UTC–7)	Try: Chloé Pelle 8' c Coralie Bertrand 8' m Jade Ulutule 9' c Camille Grassineau (2) 11' m, 13 c Con: Shannon Izar 8'; Jade Ulutule (2) 10', 14'	Report	Try: Alowesi Nakoci 1' c Reapi Ulunisau 3' c Con: Viniana Riwai (2) 2', 3'; Cards: Raijieli Daveua (yellow card)	Referee: Lauren Jenner (New Zealand)

1 May	New Zealand	38–0	Canada	Starlight Stadium
10:22 PDT (UTC–7)	Try: Portia Woodman (2) 2' c, 5' m Sarah Hirini 7' c Stacey Fluhler 8' c Risi Pouri-Lane 13' m Tenika Willison 15' c Con: Tyla Nathan-Wong (3) 2', 7', 9'; Tenika Willison 15'; Cards: Sarah Hirini (yellow card)	Report		Referee: Cisco Lopez (United States)

1 May	Ireland	17–14	United States	Starlight Stadium
10:44 PDT (UTC–7)	Try: Lucy Mulhall 5' c Katie Heffernan 13' m Amee-Leigh Murphy Crowe 15' m Con: Lucy Mulhall 6'	Report	Try: Jaz Gray 4' c Kristi Kirshe 11' c Con: Nicole Heavirland (2) 4', 11'	Referee: Selica Winiata (New Zealand)

1 May	Australia	55–0	Spain	Starlight Stadium
11:06 PDT (UTC–7)	Try: Maddison Levi (2) 3' m, 13' c Faith Nathan (2) 5' m, 6' m Sharni Williams (2) 8' c, 9' c Charlotte Caslick 10' m Dominique du Toit 11' c Sariah Paki 15' m Con: Sharni Williams (2) 9', 9'; Dominique du Toit 10'; Jesse Southwell (2) 11', 14'	Report	Cards: Lea Ducher (yellow card)	Referee: Julianne Zussman (Canada)

Semi-finals

1 May	France	14–26	New Zealand	Starlight Stadium
13:50 PDT (UTC–7)	Try: Chloé Pelle 3' c Camille Grassineau 6' c Con: Jade Ulutule (2) 4', 7'	Report	Try: Alena Saili 2' c Michaela Blyde (2) 8' c, 12' c Risi Pouri-Lane 13' m Con: Tyla Nathan-Wong (3) 2', 9', 12'	Referee: Eki Fanlo (Spain)

1 May	Ireland	5–26	Australia	Starlight Stadium
14:12 PDT (UTC–7)	Try: Vicki Elmes Kinlan 10' m	Report	Try: Charlotte Caslick 1' c Faith Nathan (2) 3' c, 6' m Sariah Paki 12' c Con: Sharni Williams (2) 1', 3'; Dominique du Toit 12'; Cards: Maddison Levi (yellow card) 10' to 12'	Referee: Lauren Jenner (New Zealand)

Third place

1 May	France	14–22	Ireland	Starlight Stadium
16:28 PDT (UTC–7)	Try: Séraphine Okemba 1' c Lou Noel 10' c Con: Jade Ulutule 2'; Shannon Izar 10'	Report	Try: Amee-Leigh Murphy Crowe (4) 4' m, 6' m, 8' m, 11' c Con: Lucy Mulhall 12'	Referee: Selica Winiata (New Zealand)

Cup Final

1 May	New Zealand	17–21	Australia	Starlight Stadium
16:58 PDT (UTC–7)	Try: Alena Saili 4' m Sarah Hirini 8' m Michaela Blyde 12' c Con: Tyla Nathan-Wong 12'	Report	Try: Maddison Levi 2' c Charlotte Caslick 8' c Lily Dick 16' c Con: Sharni Williams (2) 3', 9'; Dominique du Toit 17'	Referee: Eki Fanlo (Spain)

=== Placings ===
Place	Team	Points
1st place, gold medalist(s)	Australia	20
2nd place, silver medalist(s)	New Zealand	18
3rd place, bronze medalist(s)	Ireland	16
4	France	14
5	Canada	12
6	United States	10

Place	Team	Points
7	Fiji	8
8	Spain	6
9	Brazil	4
10	England	3
11	Japan	2
12	Mexico	1

Source: World Rugby

== See also ==
- 2022 Canada Sevens (for men)

Women's Sevens Series IX
Preceded by Seville	2022 Canada Women's Sevens	Succeeded by Toulouse
Canada Women's Sevens
Preceded by 2019 (Sevens Series); 2021 (invitational)	2022 Canada Women's Sevens	Succeeded by 2023
