= 2021 Dubai Women's Sevens =

- Women's Sevens Series IX
- Host nation: United Arab Emirates

Dubai – Event I
- Date: 26–27 November 2021
- Champion: Australia
- Runner-up: Fiji
- Third: France

Tournament details
- Matches played: 25
- Tries scored: 148 (average 5.92 per match)
- Most points: Sharni Williams (34 points)
- Most tries: Amee-Leigh Murphy Crowe; Charlotte Caslick; Demi Hayes; Séraphine Okemba (5 tries each)

Dubai – Event II
- Date: 3–4 December 2021
- Champion: Australia
- Runner-up: Fiji
- Third: France

Tournament details
- Matches played: 25
- Tries scored: 143 (average 5.72 per match)
- Most points: Jade Ulutule (42 points)
- Most tries: Alowesi Nakoci; Charlotte Caslick; Faith Nathan; Naya Tapper; Thalia Costa (6 tries each)

The 2021 Dubai Women's Sevens was held as two rugby sevens tournaments on consecutive weekends in late November and early December that year. They were played as the tenth international season of the Dubai Women's Sevens, following the cancellation of the 2020 tournament due to impacts of the COVID-19 pandemic. The tournaments were the opening events of the 2021–22 World Rugby Women's Sevens Series.

Due to ongoing impacts of the pandemic, the first event was played behind closed doors on 26–27 November 2021 with no spectators allowed, but the second event was played in front of full crowds on 3–4 December at The Sevens stadium in Dubai. Two pitches were used in Dubai, which allowed matches in overlapping time slots to be played. As only ten women's teams instead of the usual twelve competed in both tournaments, a format based on two pools with five teams in each was used.

Australia won back-to-back titles in Dubai, defeating Fiji in the final of both tournaments.

== Format ==
The ten teams at each tournament were drawn into two pools of five teams. A round-robin was held for each pool, where each team played the others in their pool once. The best teams from each pool played off in the Cup final for the gold and silver medals, and the second best teams from each pool played off in the third place final for the bronze medal.

For the lower classification matches, the third best teams from the pools played off for fifth, the fourth best played off for seventh, and the last two teams in each pool played off for ninth place.

== Teams ==
The ten national women's teams competing at both tournaments in Dubai were:

- Australia
- Brazil
- Canada
- Fiji
- France
- Great Britain
- Ireland
- Russia
- Spain
- United States

Core teams eligible to play but not participating at Dubai were:

• England, who were represented by Great Britain for the first two tournaments of the 2021–22 Series, before competing again as a separate national union for the remainder of the series.

• New Zealand, who did not participate in Dubai due to the challenges of COVID-19 travel logistics.

== Dubai: Event I ==
=== Pool stage – Event I ===
The first tournament was held with no crowd in attendance at The Sevens stadium in Dubai on 26–27 November 2021. Australia won the tournament, defeating Fiji by 22–7 in the final.

All times in UAE Standard Time (UTC+4:00). The pools were scheduled as follows:

Key:

- Team advanced to the Cup final
- Team advanced to the 3rd place final

==== Pool A – Event I ====
Team	Pld	W	D	L	PF	PA	PD	Pts
Australia	4	4	0	0	141	32	+109	12
France	4	2	0	2	98	69	+29	8
Brazil	4	2	0	2	64	86	−22	8
United States	4	2	0	2	56	88	−32	8
Spain	4	0	0	4	24	108	−84	4

26 November
8:48 UAEST (UTC+4)

Australia	45–5	United States
Try: Sharni Williams 4' m Faith Nathan 6' c Demi Hayes (2) 7' c, 9' m Lily Dick 10' c Sariah Paki 13' c Maddison Levi 15' c Con: Sharni Williams 6'; Tia Hinds (4) 8', 11', 14', 15'	Report	Try: Ilona Maher 12' m Cards: Alev Kelter (yellow card)

The Sevens
Referee: Julianne Zussman (Canada)

26 November
9:10 UAEST (UTC+4)

France	31–0	Spain
Try: Jade Ulutule 3' m Séraphine Okemba 8' c Mathilde Coutouly 11' c Ian Jason 12' c Joanna Grisez 15' m Con: Shannon Izar 9'; Yolaine Yengo (2) 12', 13'	Report

The Sevens
Referee: Katherine Ritchie (England)

26 November
11:50 UAEST (UTC+4)

Australia	34–0	Spain
Try: Charlotte Caslick (2) 2' m, 8' m Dominique du Toit 3' c Faith Nathan 5' m Lily Dick (2) 12' m, 13' c Con: Sharni Williams 3'; Tia Hinds 14'; Cards: Alysia Lefau-Fakaosilea (yellow card)	Report

The Sevens
Referee: Hollie Davidson (Scotland)

26 November
12:12 UAEST (UTC+4)

France	26–21	Brazil
Try: Yolaine Yengo 4' m Séraphine Okemba 5' c Ian Jason 11' c Jade Ulutule 14' c Con: Shannon Izar 6'; Yolaine Yengo (2) 11', 14'	Report	Try: Bianca Silva 2' c Marina Fioravanti 8' c Marcelle Souza 12' c Con: Raquel Kochhann (2) 2', 8'; Isadora Cerullo 13'

The Sevens
Referee: Ashleigh Murray-Pretorius (South Africa)

26 November
15:24 UAEST (UTC+4)

Brazil	26–12	Spain
Try: Raquel Kochhann 1' c Thalia Costa 5' c Marcelle Souza 9' c Bianca Silva 13' m Con: Raquel Kochhann (2) 2', 5'; Isadora Cerullo 9'	Report	Try: Amalia Argudo 6' m Lea Ducher 12' c Con: Lea Ducher 12'

The Sevens
Referee: Katherine Ritchie (England)

26 November
15:46 UAEST (UTC+4)

France	19–24	United States
Try: Séraphine Okemba 3' c Anne-Cécile Ciofani 10' c Valentine Lothoz 14' m Con: Shannon Izar (2) 3', 11'	Report	Try: Ilona Maher (2) 4' m, 12' m Kris Thomas 6' c Abby Gustaitis 8' c Con: Alev Kelter (2) 6', 8'

The Sevens
Referee: Julianne Zussman (Canada)

27 November
9:00 UAEST (UTC+4)

United States	17–12	Spain
Try: Jaz Gray (2) 4' m, 6' m Naya Tapper 12' c Con: Alena Olsen 13'	Report	Try: Silvia Morales 8' c Silvia Morales 10' m Con: Amalia Argudo 9'

The Sevens
Referee: Katherine Ritchie (England)

27 November
9:22 UAEST (UTC+4)

Australia	38–5	Brazil
Try: Charlotte Caslick (2) 3' c, 9' c Madison Ashby 6' m Sharni Williams 8' c Maddison Levi (2) 13' c, 15' m Con: Sharni Williams (3) 3', 8', 9'; Tia Hinds 14'	Report	Try: Isadora Cerullo 11' m Cards: Leila dos Santos Silva (yellow card)

The Sevens
Referee: Julianne Zussman (Canada)

27 November
12:01 UAEST (UTC+4)

United States	10–12	Brazil
Try: Alev Kelter 10' m Ilona Maher 13' m Cards: Alev Kelter (yellow card)	Report	Try: Thalia Costa (2) 6' c, 15' m Con: Raquel Kochhann 7'

The Sevens
Referee: Ashleigh Murray-Pretorius (South Africa)

27 November
12:23 UAEST (UTC+4)

France	22–24	Australia
Try: Séraphine Okemba 3' c Joanna Grisez 6' m Jade Ulutule 11' m Ian Jason 14' m Con: Jade Ulutule 3'	Report	Try: Sharni Williams (2) 1' m, 4' c Demi Hayes 8' m Dominique du Toit 12' c Con: Sharni Williams 5'; Tia Hinds 13'

The Sevens
Referee: Hollie Davidson (Scotland)

==== Pool B – Event I ====
Team	Pld	W	D	L	PF	PA	PD	Pts
Fiji	4	3	0	1	103	70	+33	10
Russia	4	3	0	1	65	46	+19	10
Great Britain	4	3	0	1	67	57	+10	10
Canada	4	1	0	3	64	86	−22	6
Ireland	4	0	0	4	49	89	−40	4

26 November
9:00 UAEST (UTC+4)

Great Britain	12–7	Russia
Try: Jasmine Joyce 6' c Megan Jones 12' m Con: Megan Jones 7'	Report	Try: Alena Tiron 3' c Con: Kristina Seredina 3'

The Sevens
Referee: Ashleigh Murray-Pretorius (South Africa)

26 November
9:22 UAEST (UTC+4)

Fiji	28–12	Ireland
Try: Reapi Ulunisau 4' c Ana Maria Naimasi 6' m Sesenieli Donu 11' c Laisana Likuceva 13' c Con: Rusila Nagasau (3) 5', 11', 13'; Ana Maria Naimasi 7'	Report	Try: Amee-Leigh Murphy Crowe 8' c Lucy Mulhall 16' m Con: Lucy Mulhall 9'

The Sevens
Referee: Hollie Davidson (Scotland)

26 November
12:34 UAEST (UTC+4)

Great Britain	26–15	Ireland
Try: Emma Uren 5' c Megan Jones (2) 8' c, 9' m Abbie Brown 14' m Con: Megan Jones (3) 5', 8', 15'	Report	Try: Amee-Leigh Murphy Crowe 2' m Eve Higgins 10' m Claire Boles 13' m

The Sevens
Referee: Julianne Zussman (Canada)

26 November
12:56 UAEST (UTC+4)

Fiji	28–26	Canada
Try: Reapi Ulunisau 2' c Sesenieli Donu 3' c Alowesi Nakoci 9' c Laisana Likuceva 14' c Con: Lavena Cavuru (2) 3', 4'; Rusila Nagasau 9'; Reapi Ulunisau 15'; Cards: Alowesi Nakoci (yellow card)	Report	Try: Olivia De Couvreur 5' c Asia Hogan-Rochester 6' m Breanne Nicholas 9' c Elissa Alarie 13' c Con: Breanne Nicholas (3) 5', 9', 13'

The Sevens
Referee: Katherine Ritchie (England)

26 November
18:07 UAEST (UTC+4)

Canada	21–17	Ireland
Try: Pamphinette Buisa 5' c Renee Gonzalez 7' c Elissa Alarie 10' c Con: Breanne Nicholas (3) 5', 7', 10'	Report	Try: Beibhinn Parsons 3' m Eve Higgins 8' m Amee-Leigh Murphy Crowe 15' c Con: Lucy Mulhall 15'

The Sevens
Referee: Hollie Davidson (Scotland)

26 November
19:05 UAEST (UTC+4)

Fiji	19–27	Russia
Try: Ana Maria Naimasi 5' m Sesenieli Donu 8' c Reapi Ulunisau 12' c Con: Ana Maria Naimasi 8'; Reapi Ulunisau 12'	Report	Try: Baizat Khamidova (2) 2' m, 4' m Daria Noritsina (2) 10' m, 11' m Daria Lushina 15' c Con: Daria Lushina 15'

The Sevens
Referee: Ashleigh Murray-Pretorius (South Africa)

27 November
9:44 UAEST (UTC+4)

Russia	14–5	Ireland
Try: Alena Tiron 6' c Kristina Seredina 8' c Con: Kristina Seredina (2) 7', 9'	Report	Try: Lucy Mulhall 2' m

The Sevens
Referee: Hollie Davidson (Scotland)

27 November
10:06 UAEST (UTC+4)

Great Britain	24–7	Canada
Try: Lisa Thomson 1' m Jasmine Joyce 5' c Emma Uren 9' c Grace Crompton 13' m Con: Emma Uren (2) 6', 10'	Report	Try: Nakisa Levale 8' c Con: Olivia Apps 9'

The Sevens
Referee: Ashleigh Murray-Pretorius (South Africa)

27 November
12:45 UAEST (UTC+4)

Russia	17–10	Canada
Try: Daria Noritsina 2' m Baizat Khamidova 6' c Alena Tiron 12' m Con: Kristina Seredina 7'	Report	Try: Breanne Nicholas 8' m Pamphinette Buisa 9' m

The Sevens
Referee: Katherine Ritchie (England)

27 November
13:07 UAEST (UTC+4)

Fiji	28–5	Great Britain
Try: Sesenieli Donu 3' c Vasiti Solikoviti 5' c Raijieli Daveua 9' c Rusila Nagasau 11' c Con: Lavena Cavuru (3) 4', 6', 9'; Rusila Nagasau 12'	Report	Try: Jasmine Joyce 8' m

The Sevens
Referee: Julianne Zussman (Canada)

=== Knockout stage – Event I ===
==== 9th place playoff – Event I ====
Ninth place
Spain	14
Ireland	31

Matches

9th place final

27 November	Spain	14–31	Ireland	The Sevens
15:51 UAEST (UTC+4)	Try: María García 7' c Iera Echebarria 12' c Con: Amalia Argudo 7'; Lea Ducher 12'	Report	Try: Eve Higgins 1' c Amee-Leigh Murphy Crowe (2) 4' c, 9' m Megan Burns (2) 6' m, 10' c Con: Lucy Mulhall (3) 1', 5', 10'	Referee: Katherine Ritchie (England)

==== 5th–8th place playoff – Event I ====
Seventh place
United States	17
Canada	7
Fifth place
Brazil	21
Great Britain	22

Matches

7th place final

27 November	United States	17–7	Canada	The Sevens
15:51 UAEST (UTC+4)	Try: Alex Sedrick 3' c Naya Tapper (2) 6' m, 8' m Con: Alena Olsen 4'	Report	Try: Olivia De Couvreur 1' c Con: Breanne Nicholas 2'	Referee: Hollie Davidson (Scotland)

5th place final

27 November	Brazil	21–22	Great Britain	The Sevens
17:15 UAEST (UTC+4)	Try: Bianca Silva 7' c Edna Santini 11' c Gabriela Lima 14' c Con: Raquel Kochhann (2) 7', 15'; Isadora Cerullo 11'	Report	Try: Jasmine Joyce 4' m Ellie Boatman 8' m Abbie Brown 13' c Grace Crompton 15' m Con: Emma Uren 13'	Referee: Ashleigh Murray-Pretorius (South Africa)

==== Cup playoff – Event I ====
Third place
France	40
Russia	0
Cup Final
Australia	22
Fiji	7

Matches

3rd place final

27 November	France	40–0	Russia	The Sevens
18:07 UAEST (UTC+4)		Report

Cup final

27 November	Australia	22–7	Fiji	The Sevens
18:56 UAEST (UTC+4)	Try: Demi Hayes (2) 3' c, 8' m Lily Dick 5' m Charlotte Caslick 7' m Con: Sharni Williams 3'	Report	Try: Alowesi Nakoci 13' c Con: Reapi Ulunisau 13'	Referee: Hollie Davidson (Scotland)

=== Placings – Event I ===
Place	Team	Points
1st place, gold medalist(s)	Australia	20
2nd place, silver medalist(s)	Fiji	18
3rd place, bronze medalist(s)	France	16
4	Russia	14
5	Great Britain	12

Place	Team	Points
6	Brazil	10
7	United States	8
8	Canada	6
9	Ireland	4
10	Spain	3

Source: World Rugby

== Dubai: Event II ==
=== Pool stage – Event II ===
The second tournament was played with spectators in attendance at The Sevens stadium in Dubai on 3–4 December 2021. Australia won the tournament, defeating Fiji by 15–5 in the final.

All times in UAE Standard Time (UTC+4:00). The pools were scheduled as follows:

Key:

- Team advanced to the Cup final
- Team advanced to the 3rd place final

==== Pool A – Event II ====
Team	Pld	W	D	L	PF	PA	PD	Pts
Australia	4	4	0	0	153	24	+129	12
Russia	4	3	0	1	86	60	+26	10
Spain	4	2	0	2	50	102	−52	8
Canada	4	1	0	3	39	90	−51	6
Brazil	4	0	0	4	38	90	−52	4

3 December
9:00 UAEST (UTC+4)

Russia	17–5	Brazil
Try: Alena Tiron (2) 6' m, 14' m Daria Noritsina 9' c Con: Kristina Seredina 9'	Report	Try: Bianca Silva 1' m

The Sevens
Referee: Hollie Davidson (Scotland)

3 December
9:22 UAEST (UTC+4)

Australia	40–0	Spain
Try: Faith Nathan (2) 2' c, 4' m Charlotte Caslick (2) 5' c, 8' c Jakiya Whitfeld 10' c Dominique du Toit 12' c Con: Tia Hinds (5) 3', 6', 9', 11', 12'	Report

The Sevens
Referee: Katherine Ritchie (England)

3 December
12:24 UAEST (UTC+4)

Russia	38–17	Spain
Try: Daria Noritsina 2' c Baizat Khamidova (2) 3' m, 10' c Kristina Seredina 8' c, 12' m Viktoriia Em 16' c Con: Kristina Seredina (3) 2', 8', 11'; Daria Lushina 16'	Report	Try: María García (2) 8' c, 13' m Amalia Argudo 14' m Con: Beatriz Dominguez 9'

The Sevens

3 December
12:46 UAEST (UTC+4)

Australia	52–0	Canada
Try: Sharni Williams 2' c Faith Nathan 4' c Dominique du Toit 6' m Demi Hayes 8' c Madison Ashby 8' c Charlotte Caslick 10' c Rhiannon Byers 13' c Jakiya Whitfeld 15' m Con: Sharni Williams (5) 3', 5', 8', 9', 10'; Tia Hinds 13'	Report

The Sevens
Referee: Ashleigh Murray-Pretorius (South Africa)

3 December
19:07 UAEST (UTC+4)

Canada	10–12	Spain
Try: Breanne Nicholas 9' m Olivia De Couvreur 13' m	Report	Try: María García 3' c Lea Ducher 15' m Con: Amalia Argudo 4'

The Sevens
Referee: Katherine Ritchie (England)

3 December
20:05 UAEST (UTC+4)

Australia	35–7	Brazil
Try: Faith Nathan 1' c Sharni Williams 4' c Charlotte Caslick (2) 8' c, 14' c Lily Dick 9' c Con: (4) 1', 4', 9', 10'; Tia Hinds 15'	Report	Try: Thalia Costa 2' c Con: Raquel Kochhann 3'

The Sevens
Referee: Julianne Zussman (Canada)

4 December
9:00 UAEST (UTC+4)

Brazil	14–21	Spain
Try: Thalia Costa (2) 3' c, 8' c Con: Isadora Cerullo 3'; Raquel Kochhann 9'	Report	Try: Lea Ducher 9' c Beatriz Dominguez 11' c Anne Fernández de Corres 13' c Con: Lea Ducher (3) 9', 11', 13'

The Sevens
Referee: Julianne Zussman (Canada)

4 December
9:22 UAEST (UTC+4)

Russia	14–12	Canada
Try: Daria Noritsina 4' c Kristina Seredina 12' c Con: Kristina Seredina 5'; Daria Lushina 13'	Report	Try: Elissa Alarie 9' c Sabrina Poulin 11' m Con: Breanne Nicholas 9'

The Sevens
Referee: Ashleigh Murray-Pretorius (South Africa)

4 December
12:51 UAEST (UTC+4)

Brazil	12–17	Canada
Try: Thalia Costa 11' c Gabriela Lima 12' m Con: Raquel Kochhann 11'	Report	Try: Sabrina Poulin 3' m Nakisa Levale 6' m Krissy Scurfield 9' c Con: Asia Hogan-Rochester 9'

The Sevens
Referee: Katherine Ritchie (England)

4 December
13:13 UAEST (UTC+4)

Australia	26–17	Russia
Try: Madison Ashby 7' c Faith Nathan 8' c Charlotte Caslick 9' c Dominique du Toit 13' m Con: Sharni Williams (3) 7', 9', 10'	Report	Try: Marina Kukina 2' m Alena Tiron 3' m Daria Noritsina 8' c Con: Kristina Seredina 9'

The Sevens
Referee: Hollie Davidson (Scotland)

==== Pool B – Event II ====
Team	Pld	W	D	L	PF	PA	PD	Pts
Fiji	4	4	0	0	79	58	+21	12
France	4	3	0	1	102	29	+73	10
United States	4	2	0	2	71	78	–7	8
Ireland	4	1	0	3	55	89	–34	6
Great Britain	4	0	0	4	61	114	–53	4

3 December
9:00 UAEST (UTC+4)

France	33–12	Great Britain
Try: Carla Neisen 2' c Shannon Izar 4' c Séraphine Okemba 8' c Jade Ulutule 9' c Anne-Cécile Ciofani 11'; Con: Shannon Izar (2) 2', 8'; Jade Ulutule (2) 4', 9'	Report	Try: Jasmine Joyce 9' c Shona Campbell 15' m Con: Megan Jones 10'; Cards: Megan Jones (yellow card)

The Sevens
Referee: Jaco De Wit (United Arab Emirates)

3 December
9:22 UAEST (UTC+4)

Fiji	24–19	Ireland
Try: Alowesi Nakoci 1' c Sesenieli Donu 4' m Reapi Ulunisau 12' c Ana Roqica 15' m Con: Lavena Cavuru 2'; Reapi Ulunisau 12'	Report	Try: Lucy Mulhall 7' m Beibhinn Parsons 10' c Kathy Baker 13' c Con: Lucy Mulhall (2) 11', 13'

The Sevens
Referee: Julianne Zussman (Canada)

3 December
11:40 UAEST (UTC+4)

France	29–0	Ireland
Try: Jade Ulutule 2' m Shannon Izar 6' m Anne-Cécile Ciofani 9' m Joanna Grisez (2) 14' c, 15' c Con: Jade Ulutule (2) 14', 16'	Report

The Sevens
Referee: Hollie Davidson (Scotland)

3 December
12:02 UAEST (UTC+4)

Fiji	21–12	United States
Try: Alowesi Nakoci 8' c Sesenieli Donu (2) 13' c, 14' c Con: Lavena Cavuru 8'; Ana Maria Naimasi 14'; Reapi Ulunisau 15'	Report	Try: Naya Tapper 1' m Ilona Maher 10' c Con: Alena Olsen 11'

The Sevens
Referee: Jeremy Rozier (France)

3 December
15:52 UAEST (UTC+4)

United States	19–12	Ireland
Try: Ilona Maher 1' c Naya Tapper 6' m Lote Tausinga 16' c Con: Alena Olsen (2) 2', 16'	Report	Try: Beibhinn Parsons (2) 4' m, 8' c Con: Lucy Mulhall 8'

The Sevens
Referee: Hollie Davidson (Scotland)

3 December
16:14 UAEST (UTC+4)

Fiji	17–15	Great Britain
Try: Alowesi Nakoci (2) 3' m, 8' m Reapi Ulunisau 12' c Con: Reapi Ulunisau 12'	Report	Try: Jasmine Joyce 6' m Abbie Brown 8' m Abi Burton 15' m

The Sevens
Referee: AJ Jacobs (South Africa)

4 December
9:00 UAEST (UTC+4)

Great Britain	17–24	Ireland
Try: Alicia Maude 1' m Jasmine Joyce 3' c Megan Jones 9' m Con: Megan Jones 4'	Report	Try: Amee-Leigh Murphy Crowe 5' c Claire Boles 7' m Lucy Mulhall 10' c Megan Burns 13' m Con: Lucy Mulhall (2) 6', 10'

The Sevens
Referee: Gianluca Gnecchi (Italy)

4 December
9:22 UAEST (UTC+4)

France	28–0	United States
Try: Joanna Grisez 2' c Jade Ulutule 4' c Séraphine Okemba 6' c Séraphine Okemba 11' c Con: Jade Ulutule (4) 3', 4', 7', 12'	Report

The Sevens
Referee: Hollie Davidson (Scotland)

4 December
12:07 UAEST (UTC+4)

Great Britain	17–40	United States
Try: Emma Uren 10' c Alicia Maude 11' m Heather Cowell 14' m Con: Megan Jones 10'	Report	Try: Naya Tapper (3) 1' c, 3' c, 6' c Alev Kelter (2) 8' c, 12' c Kris Thomas 15' m Con: Alena Olsen (3) 2', 3', 6'; Alev Kelter (2) 8', 12'

The Sevens
Referee: Julianne Zussman (Canada)

4 December
12:29 UAEST (UTC+4)

Fiji	17–12	France
Try: Alowesi Nakoci (2) 8' m, 8' c Reapi Ulunisau 11' m Con: Lavena Cavuru 9'	Report	Try: Camille Grassineau 7' m Joanna Grisez 14' c Con: Shannon Izar 14'

The Sevens
Referee: Jaco De Wit (United Arab Emirates)

=== Knockout stage – Event II ===
==== 9th place playoff ====
Ninth place
Brazil	26
Great Britain	24

Matches

9th place playoff – Event II

4 December	Brazil	26–24	Great Britain	The Sevens
17:04 UAEST (UTC+4)	Try: Thalia Costa (2) 3' c, 8' m Bianca Silva 11' c Gabriela Lima 14' c Con: Isadora Cerullo 3'; Raquel Kochhann (2) 11', 14'; Cards: Leila dos Santos Silva (yellow card)	Report	Try: Grace Crompton 1' c Shona Campbell 5' m Abbie Brown (2) 7' c, 9' m Con: Megan Jones (2) 2', 8'	Referee: Jaco De Wit (United Arab Emirates)

==== 5th–8th place playoff – Event II ====
Seventh place
Canada	12
Ireland	26
Fifth place
Spain	5
United States	7

Matches

7th place final

4 December	Canada	12–26	Ireland	The Sevens
16:19 UAEST (UTC+4)	Try: Asia Hogan-Rochester 7' m Chloe Daniels 13' c Con: Asia Hogan-Rochester 13'	Report	Try: Lucy Mulhall 1' c Stacey Flood 4' c Beibhinn Parsons (2) 8' c, 11' m Con: Lucy Mulhall (3) 1', 4', 8'	Referee: Ashleigh Murray-Pretorius (South Africa)

5th place final

4 December	Spain	5–7	United States	The Sevens
16:41 UAEST (UTC+4)	Try: Beatriz Dominguez 7' m	Report	Try: Naya Tapper 2' c Con: Alena Olsen 2'	Referee: Katherine Ritchie (England)

==== Cup playoff – Event II ====
Third place
Russia	5
France	28
Cup Final
Australia	15
Fiji	5

Matches

3rd place final

4 December	Russia	5–28	France	The Sevens
18:07 UAEST (UTC+4)	Try: Daria Noritsina 14' m Cards: Daria Noritsina (yellow card)	Report	Try: Shannon Izar 2' c Camille Grassineau 6' c Jade Ulutule 7' c Valentine Lothoz 9' c Con: Jade Ulutule (3) 3', 6', 8'; Shannon Izar 10'	Referee: Julianne Zussman (Canada)

Cup final

4 December	Australia	15–5	Fiji	The Sevens
18:56 UAEST (UTC+4)	Try: Faith Nathan 4' m Madison Ashby (2) 8' m, 12' m Cards: Alysia Lefau-Fakaosilea (yellow card)	Report	Try: Reapi Ulunisau 8' m	Referee: Hollie Davidson (Scotland)

=== Placings – Event II ===
Place	Team	Points
1st place, gold medalist(s)	Australia	20
2nd place, silver medalist(s)	Fiji	18
3rd place, bronze medalist(s)	France	16
4	Russia	14
5	United States	12

Place	Team	Points
6	Spain	10
7	Ireland	8
8	Canada	6
9	Brazil	4
10	Great Britain	3

Source: World Rugby

== See also ==
- 2021 Dubai Sevens (for men's teams)

World Sevens Women's Series IX
Preceded by None (first event)	2021 Dubai Women's Sevens	Succeeded by 2022 Spain Women's Sevens
Dubai Sevens
Preceded by 2019 Dubai Women's Sevens	2021 Dubai Women's Sevens	Succeeded by 2022 Dubai Women's Sevens
