= 2022 France Women's Sevens =

- Women's Sevens Series IX
- Host nation: France
- Date: 20–22 May 2022

Cup
- Champion: New Zealand
- Runner-up: Australia
- Third: Fiji

Tournament details
- Matches played: 34
- Tries scored: 194 (average 5.71 per match)
- Most points: Joanna Grisez (11 tries)
- Most tries: Joanna Grisez (55 points)

The 2022 France Women's Sevens was the final rugby sevens event on the 2021–22 Women's Sevens Series. An annual Series event since 2016, it was the first event to be played since 2019 due to the impacts of COVID-19. The defending champions from the 2019 series event were the United States, whom beat New Zealand 26–10.

New Zealand won in the Final against Australia 21–14.

== Format ==
The twelve teams are drawn into three pools of four. Each team will play their other three opponents in their pool once. The top two teams from each pool advance to the Cup bracket, with the two best third-placed teams also advancing. The remaining four teams will compete for a 9th–12th placing.

== Teams ==
The twelve national women's teams competing in France were:

- Australia
- Brazil
- Canada
- England
- Fiji
- France
- Ireland
- New Zealand
- Scotland
- South Africa
- Spain
- United States
- Scotland returned to the series as an invited team. Their previous appearance as an individual team was also in France, at the most previous event (2019 Biarritz).
- South Africa was an invited team for the tournament and made their first appearance on the World Series since their home event in 2019, Cape Town.

== Pool stage ==
The team composition of the pool stage was announced on 4 May.

=== Pool A ===
Team	Pld	W	D	L	PF	PA	PD	Pts
Australia	3	3	0	0	112	21	+91	9
Fiji	3	2	0	1	106	43	+63	7
United States	3	1	0	2	34	57	–23	5
South Africa	3	0	0	3	0	131	–131	3

20 May
10:14 CEST (UTC+2)

United States	12–26	Fiji
Try: Sarah Levy 12' m Ilona Maher 15' c Con: Alena Olsen 15'; Cards: Lauren Doyle (yellow card)	Report	Try: Alowesi Nakoci (2) 3' c, 5' c Vasiti Solikoviti 6' m Reapi Ulunisau 8' c Con: Lavena Cavuru (3) 4', 5', 8'

Stade Ernest-Wallon
Referee: Hollie Davidson (Scotland)

20 May
10:36 CEST (UTC+2)

Australia	50–0	South Africa
Try: Faith Nathan (2) 1' m, 5' c Charlotte Caslick (3) 2' c, 13' m, 14' c Maddison Levi (2) 4' c, 8' c Bienne Terita 11' m Con: Dominique du Toit (3) 3', 4', 6'; Tia Hinds (2) 10', 15'	Report	Cards: Anacadia Minnaar (yellow card)

Stade Ernest-Wallon
Referee: Katherine Ritchie (England)

20 May
17:44 CEST (UTC+2)

United States	22–0	South Africa
Try: Ilona Maher 3' m Alex Sedrick 7' m Kayla Canett 12' c Kristi Kirshe 14' m Con: Kayla Canett 13'	Report

Stade Ernest-Wallon
Referee: Eki Fanlo (Spain)

20 May
18:06 CEST (UTC+2)

Australia	31–21	Fiji
Try: Tia Hinds 3' m Maddison Levi 7' c Faith Nathan (2) 9' c, 12' c Charlotte Caslick 14' m Con: Tia Hinds (2) 7', 9'; Dominique du Toit 12'	Report	Try: Reapi Ulunisau (2) 1' c, 8' c Alowesi Nakoci 10' c Con: Lavena Cavuru (3) 2', 9', 11'

Stade Ernest-Wallon
Referee: Ashleigh Murray-Pretorius (South Africa)

21 May
10:14 CEST (UTC+2)

Fiji	59–0	South Africa
Try: Sesenieli Donu (2) 3' c, 10' c Verenaisi Ditavutu 5' c Lavena Cavuru 6' c Adi vani Buleki 7' c Reapi Ulunisau 8' c Ana Maria Naimasi (2) 9' m, 12' c Alowesi Nakoci 14' m Con: Lavena Cavuru (4) 3', 5', 6', 8'; Ana Maria Naimasi 8'; Viniana Riwai (2) 11', 13'	Report

Stade Ernest-Wallon
Referee: Katherine Ritchie (England)

21 May
10:36 CEST (UTC+2)

Australia	31–0	United States
Try: Charlotte Caslick 3' c Maddison Levi (2) 8' c, 11' c Teagan Levi 8' m Faith Nathan 13' m Con: Sharni Williams (2) 4', 8'; Jesse Southwell 12'	Report

Stade Ernest-Wallon
Referee: Craig Chan (Hong Kong)

=== Pool B ===
Team	Pld	W	D	L	PF	PA	PD	Pts
New Zealand	3	3	0	0	91	0	+91	9
Canada	3	2	0	1	40	36	+4	7
Spain	3	1	0	2	29	62	–33	5
Scotland	3	0	0	3	14	76	–62	3

20 May
9:30 CEST (UTC+2)

Canada	26–12	Spain
Try: Keyara Wardley (2) 4' c, 11' c Krissy Scurfield 6' c Bianca Farella 15' m Con: Breanne Nicholas (3) 4', 6', 11'	Report	Try: Paula Requena 3' m Beatriz Dominguez 9' c Con: Lea Ducher 10'

Stade Ernest-Wallon
Referee: Gianluca Gnecchi (Italy)

20 May
9:52 CEST (UTC+2)

New Zealand	45–0	Scotland
Try: Michaela Blyde (2) 4' c, 8' c Niall Williams (2) 5' c, 11' c Stacey Fluhler (2) 7' m, 9' c Tenika Willison 12' m Con: Risi Pouri-Lane (4) 4', 5', 8', 9'; Tenika Willison 12'; Cards: Jazmin Hotham (yellow card)	Report

Stade Ernest-Wallon
Referee: Julianne Zussman (Canada)

20 May
17:00 CEST (UTC+2)

Canada	14–7	Scotland
Try: Emma Chown 9' c Krissy Scurfield 12' c Con: Olivia Apps 9'; Breanne Nicholas 12'; Cards: Olivia De Couvreur (yellow card)	Report	Try: Rhona Lloyd 14' c Con: Helen Nelson 14'; Cards: Chloe Rollie (yellow card)

Stade Ernest-Wallon
Referee: Katherine Ritchie (England)

20 May
17:22 CEST (UTC+2)

New Zealand	29–0	Spain
Try: Michaela Blyde (2) 2' c, 4' m Jazmin Hotham 7' c Portia Woodman 10' m Shiray Kaka 11' m Con: Tenika Willison (2) 2', 7'	Report

Stade Ernest-Wallon
Referee: Hollie Davidson (Scotland)

21 May
9:30 CEST (UTC+2)

Spain	17–7	Scotland
Try: María García (2) 2' m, 6' m Beatriz Dominguez 11' c Con: Lea Ducher 11'	Report	Try: Chloe Rollie 14' c Con: Helen Nelson 14'

Stade Ernest-Wallon
Referee: Ashleigh Murray-Pretorius (South Africa)

21 May
9:52 CEST (UTC+2)

New Zealand	17–0	Canada
Try: Kelly Brazier 4' m Jazmin Hotham 9' c Theresa Fitzpatrick 14' m Con: Risi Pouri-Lane 10'; Cards: Stacey Fluhler (yellow card)	Report	Cards: Breanne Nicholas (yellow card)

Stade Ernest-Wallon
Referee: Eki Fanlo (Spain)

=== Pool C ===
Team	Pld	W	D	L	PF	PA	PD	Pts
France	3	3	0	0	69	19	+50	9
Ireland	3	2	0	1	53	38	+15	7
Brazil	3	1	0	2	52	48	+4	5
England	3	0	0	3	26	95	–69	3

20 May
10:58 CEST (UTC+2)

France	24–7	Brazil
Try: Joanna Grisez (2) 3' c, 4' c Chloe Jacquet 7' m Alycia Chrystiaens 11' m Con: Jade Ulutule (2) 3', 5'; Cards: Carla Neisen (yellow card)	Report	Try: Thalia Costa 13' c Con: Raquel Kochhann 14'

Stade Ernest-Wallon
Referee: Ashleigh Murray-Pretorius (South Africa)

20 May
11:20 CEST (UTC+2)

Ireland	31–12	England
Try: Lucy Mulhall (3) 2' c, 5' c, 14' m Amee-Leigh Murphy Crowe 3' m Eve Higgins 9' c Con: Lucy Mulhall (3) 2', 5', 10'	Report	Try: Ellie Boatman 1' m Emma Uren 6' c Con: Isla Norman-Bell 7'

Stade Ernest-Wallon
Referee: Eki Fanlo (Spain)

20 May
21:07 CEST (UTC+2)

France	33–7	England
Try: Lou Noel (2) 1' c, 11' m Joanna Grisez (2) 5' c, 7' c Jade Ulutule 9' c Con: Jade Ulutule (4) 2', 5', 7', 10'	Report	Try: Emma Uren 3' c Con: Isla Norman-Bell 3'

Stade Ernest-Wallon
Referee: Finlay Brown (Scotland)

20 May
21:35 CEST (UTC+2)

Ireland	17–14	Brazil
Try: Eve Higgins 7' c Amee-Leigh Murphy Crowe (2) 12' m, 14' m Con: Lucy Mulhall 7'	Report	Try: Bianca Silva 3' c Gabriela Lima 9' c Con: Raquel Kochhann (2) 4', 9'

Stade Ernest-Wallon
Referee: Julianne Zussman (Canada)

21 May
10:58 CEST (UTC+2)

Brazil	31–7	England
Try: Thalia Costa (3) 4' c, 6' c, 13' c Mariana Nicolau 9' m Gabriela Lima 15' m Con: Raquel Kochhann 4'; Luiza Campos 7'; Marina Fioravanti 14'; Cards: Thalia Costa (yellow card)	Report	Try: Amy Wilson Hardy 2' c Con: Isla Norman-Bell 3'

Stade Ernest-Wallon
Referee: Eki Fanlo (Spain)

21 May
11:20 CEST (UTC+2)

Ireland	5–12	France
Try: Megan Burns 2'	Report	Try: Joanna Grisez 10' c Jade Ulutule 12' m Con: Jade Ulutule 11'

Stade Ernest-Wallon
Referee: Hollie Davidson (Scotland)

=== Ranking of third-placed teams ===
Team	Pld	W	D	L	PF	PA	PD	Pts
Brazil	3	1	0	2	52	48	+4	5
United States	3	1	0	2	34	57	–23	5
Spain	3	1	0	2	29	62	–33	5

== Knockout stage ==
=== 9th–12th playoffs ===
9th place Semi-finals
21 May – Stade Ernest-Wallon
Spain	19
South Africa	21
21 May – Stade Ernest-Wallon
Scotland	21
England	19

9th place Final
22 May – Stade Ernest-Wallon
South Africa	10
Scotland	24
11th place Final
22 May – Stade Ernest-Wallon
Spain	26
England	14

Matches

Semi-finals

21 May	Spain	19–21	South Africa	Stade Ernest-Wallon
15:30 CEST (UTC+2)	Try: Iera Echebarria 5' c Lea Ducher 12' m Eva Aguirre Diaz 15' c Con: Ingrid Algar 6'; Lea Ducher 16'	Report	Try: Ayanda Malinga 3' c Nadine Roos (2) 8' c, 9' c Con: Nadine Roos (3) 3', 8', 10'; Cards: Alichia Arries (yellow card)	Referee: Katherine Ritchie (England)

21 May	Scotland	21–19	England	Stade Ernest-Wallon
15:52 CEST (UTC+2)	Try: Shona Campbell (2) 5' c, 9' c Rhona Lloyd 12' c Con: Helen Nelson (3) 5', 10', 13'	Report	Try: Ellie Boatman (2) 2' c, 10' m Jodie Ounsley 7' c Con: Isla Norman-Bell (2) 3', 7'	Referee: Ashleigh Murray-Pretorius (South Africa)

11th place Final

22 May	Spain	26–14	England	Stade Ernest-Wallon
9:30 CEST (UTC+2)	Try: María García 2' c Iera Echebarria 6' m Lea Ducher 9' c Amalia Argudo 14' c Con: Lea Ducher (2) 2', 10'; Amalia Argudo 15'	Report	Try: Ellie Boatman 3' c Isla Norman-Bell 8' c Con: Isla Norman-Bell (2) 4', 9'	Referee: Ashleigh Murray-Pretorius (South Africa)

9th place Final

22 May	South Africa	10–24	Scotland	Stade Ernest-Wallon
9:52 CEST (UTC+2)	Try: Zintle Mpupha 3' m Ayanda Malinga 6' m	Report	Try: Rhona Lloyd (3) 1' m, 8' c, 10' c Lisa Thomson 15' m Con: Helen Nelson 8'; Meryl Smith 10'	Referee: Doriane Domenjo (France)

=== 5th–8th playoffs ===
5th place Semi-finals
22 May – Stade Ernest-Wallon
Brazil	7
France	36
22 May – Stade Ernest-Wallon
Canada	19
United States	7

5th place Final
22 May – Stade Ernest-Wallon
France	19
Canada	14
7th place Final
22 May – Stade Ernest-Wallon
Brazil	7
United States	15

Matches

Semi-finals

22 May	Brazil	7–36	France	Stade Ernest-Wallon
10:14 CEST (UTC+2)	Try: Bianca Silva 3' c Con: Luiza Campos 3'	Report	Try: Joanna Grisez (4) 1' c, 7' m, 9' c, 11' m Jade Ulutule 5' c Alycia Chrystiaens 15' m Con: Jade Ulutule (2) 1', 6'; Yolaine Yengo 9'	Referee: Katherine Ritchie (England)

22 May	Canada	19–7	United States	Stade Ernest-Wallon
10:36 CEST (UTC+2)	Try: Keyara Wardley 5' c Olivia De Couvreur 8' m Bianca Farella 9' c Con: Breanne Nicholas (2) 5', 9'; Cards: Krissy Scurfield (yellow card) 12' to 14'	Report	Try: Kristi Kirshe 2' c Con: Nicole Heavirland 2'; Cards: Sarah Levy (yellow card) 11' to 13'	Referee: Eki Fanlo (Spain)

7th place Final

22 May	Brazil	7–15	United States	Stade Ernest-Wallon
15:02 CEST (UTC+2)	Try: Thalia Costa 9' c Con: Luiza Campos 10'	Report	Try: Nicole Heavirland 1' m Kristi Kirshe 7' m Jaz Gray 13' m	Referee: Doriane Domenjo (France)

5th place Final

22 May	France	19–14	Canada	Stade Ernest-Wallon
15:24 CEST (UTC+2)	Try: Jade Ulutule 5' m Yolaine Yengo 8' c Joanna Grisez 13' c Con: Jade Ulutule (2) 8', 13'; Cards: Joanna Grisez (yellow card)	Report	Try: Krissy Scurfield 12' c Ella O'Regan 15' c Con: Olivia Apps (2) 12', 16'	Referee: Katherine Ritchie (England)

=== Cup playoffs ===
Quarter-finals
21 May – Stade Ernest-Wallon
New Zealand	41
Brazil	0
21 May – Stade Ernest-Wallon
France	12
Fiji	24
21 May – Stade Ernest-Wallon
Canada	21
Ireland	22
21 May – Stade Ernest-Wallon
Australia	24
United States	14

Semi-finals
22 May – Stade Ernest-Wallon
New Zealand	24
Fiji	14
22 May – Stade Ernest-Wallon
Ireland	7
Australia	40

Cup Final
22 May – Stade Ernest-Wallon
New Zealand	21
Australia	14
Third place
22 May – Stade Ernest-Wallon
Fiji	26
Ireland	10

Matches

Quarter-finals

21 May	New Zealand	41–0	Brazil	Stade Ernest-Wallon
17:42 CEST (UTC+2)	Try: Michaela Blyde (2) 3' m, 4' c Risi Pouri-Lane 7' c Portia Woodman (3) 9' m, 10' c, 14' m Shiray Kaka 12' m Con: Risi Pouri-Lane (2) 5', 8'; Tenika Willison 11'	Report	Cards: Claudia Teles (yellow card)	Referee: Ashleigh Murray-Pretorius (South Africa)

21 May	France	12–24	Fiji	Stade Ernest-Wallon
20:35 CEST (UTC+2)	Try: Joanna Grisez 11' c Ian Jason 15' m Con: Jade Ulutule 11'	Report	Try: Lavena Cavuru 3' c Alowesi Nakoci 5' m Ana Maria Naimasi 7' c Rusila Nagasau 8' m Con: Lavena Cavuru (2) 3', 7'	Referee: Gianluca Gnecchi (Italy)

21 May	Canada	21–22	Ireland	Stade Ernest-Wallon
19:37 CEST (UTC+2)	Try: Renee Gonzalez 2' c Olivia Apps 6' c Olivia De Couvreur 10' c Con: Breanne Nicholas (2) 2', 11'; Olivia Apps 7'	Report	Try: Lucy Mulhall 1' c Erin King (2) 8' m, 8' m Eve Higgins 13' m Con: Lucy Mulhall 1'	Referee: Eki Fanlo (Spain)

21 May	Australia	24–14	United States	Stade Ernest-Wallon
18:26 CEST (UTC+2)	Try: Maddison Levi 4' m Sharni Williams 6' c Charlotte Caslick 8' m Lily Dick 13' c Con: Sharni Williams 7'; Dominique du Toit 13'; Cards: Sariah Paki (yellow card)	Report	Try: Ilona Maher 3' c Jaz Gray 12' c Con: Nicole Heavirland (2) 3', 12'	Referee: Hollie Davidson (Scotland)

Semi-finals

22 May	New Zealand	24–14	Fiji	Stade Ernest-Wallon
13:30 CEST (UTC+2)	Try: Michaela Blyde (2) 4' c, 6' m Sarah Hirini (2) 10' c, 14' m Con: Risi Pouri-Lane (2) 5', 10'; Cards: Theresa Fitzpatrick (yellow card)	Report	Try: Reapi Ulunisau 8' c Alowesi Nakoci 12' c Con: Reapi Ulunisau 9'; Ana Maria Naimasi 12'; Cards: Ana Maria Naimasi (yellow card); Sesenieli Donu (yellow card)	Referee: Hollie Davidson (Scotland)

22 May	Ireland	7–40	Australia	Stade Ernest-Wallon
13:52 CEST (UTC+2)	Try: Amee-Leigh Murphy Crowe 5' c Con: Lucy Mulhall 6'; Cards: Amee-Leigh Murphy Crowe (yellow card); Eve Higgins (yellow card)	Report	Try: Maddison Levi (2) 4' m, 10' c Madison Ashby 7' c Charlotte Caslick 11' c Dominique du Toit 13' c Faith Nathan 15' c Con: Dominique du Toit (4) 7', 10', 12', 13'; Tia Hinds 15'; Cards: Faith Nathan (yellow card)	Referee: Eki Fanlo (Spain)

Third place

22 May	Fiji	26–10	Ireland	Stade Ernest-Wallon
15:24 CEST (UTC+2)	Try: Raijieli Daveua 6' c Alowesi Nakoci (2) 7' c, 13' c Sesenieli Donu 8' m Con: Lavena Cavuru (2) 6', 7'; Viniana Riwai 13'; Cards: Reapi Ulunisau (yellow card)	Report	Try: Vicki Elmes Kinlan 10' m Stacey Flood 12' m	Referee: Ben Breakspear (Wales)

Cup Final

22 May	New Zealand	21–14	Australia	Stade Ernest-Wallon
17:56 CEST (UTC+2)	Try: Risi Pouri-Lane 5' c Alena Saili 8' c Kelly Brazier 12' c Con: Risi Pouri-Lane (3) 5', 9', 12'	Report	Try: Demi Hayes 2' c Faith Nathan 7' c Con: Dominique du Toit (2) 3', 7'	Referee: Hollie Davidson (Scotland)

=== Placings ===
Place	Team	Points
1st place, gold medalist(s)	New Zealand	20
2nd place, silver medalist(s)	Australia	18
3rd place, bronze medalist(s)	Fiji	16
4	Ireland	14
5	France	12
6	Canada	10

Place	Team	Points
7	United States	8
8	Brazil	6
9	Scotland	4
10	South Africa	3
11	Spain	2
12	England	1

Source: World Rugby

== See also ==
- 2022 France Sevens (for men)

Women's Sevens Series IX
Preceded by Langford	2022 France Women's Sevens	Succeeded by None (final series event)
France Women's Sevens
Preceded by 2019	2022 France Women's Sevens	Succeeded by 2023
