= 2021–22 World Rugby Women's Sevens Series =

2021–22 World Rugby Women's Sevens
- Series IX
- Hosts: UAE (2 events); Spain (2 events); Canada; France
- Date: 26 November 2021 – 22 May 2022

Final positions
- Champions: Australia (3rd title)
- Runners-up: France
- Third: Fiji

Team changes
- Promoted: Japan
- Relegated: Russia

Series details
- Top try scorer: Amee-Leigh Murphy Crowe (36 tries)
- Top point scorer: Jade Ulutule (226 points)

The 2021–22 World Rugby Women's Sevens Series was the ninth edition of the global circuit for women's national rugby sevens teams, organised by World Rugby. The ninth edition was meant to be played a year earlier, but the 2021 Series was cancelled due to the impact of the COVID-19 pandemic.

Australia won the series at the second-last event in Canada, winning four out of the six events on the tour to claim their third World Series title. France, Fiji and Ireland placed second, third and fourth, respectively, which was the best finish achieved by all three teams in the World Series.

The 2021–22 series was affected by ongoing impacts of the COVID-19 pandemic, with two of the eleven core teams not able to compete in all six events as a result. The defending series champions New Zealand missed the first four events due to travel-related restrictions, and Fiji was forced to withdraw from both tournaments in Spain due to positive COVID-19 tests in their squad.

A further two core teams also only played in four of the six events. England was replaced by a united Great Britain team for the first two tournaments in Dubai, and Russia was banned from competing following the Russian invasion of Ukraine.

== Core teams ==
Due to impacts of the COVID-19 pandemic, the core teams were unchanged from the shortened 2019–20 series and cancelled 2021 season. The eleven core teams qualified to participate in all events for 2021–22 were:

- Australia
- Brazil (Note: Brazil had core team status for the cancelled 2020–21 series, after winning the qualifier event in 2019, and retained that status for 2021–22.)
- Canada
- England
- Fiji
- France
- Ireland
- New Zealand
- ~~Russia~~ (Note: Russia was suspended from all international rugby, including the 2021–22 World Sevens Series for women's teams, following the Russian invasion of Ukraine.)
- Spain
- United States

== Tour venues ==
The schedule for the series was:

2021–22 Itinerary
Leg	Stadium	City	Dates	Winner
Dubai (2 events)	The Sevens	Dubai	26–27 November 2021	Australia
Dubai (2 events)	The Sevens	Dubai	3–4 December 2021	Australia
Spain (2 events)	Estadio Ciudad de Málaga	Málaga	21–23 January 2022	United States
Spain (2 events)	Estadio de La Cartuja	Seville	28–30 January 2022	Australia
Canada	Westhills Stadium	Langford	30 April – 1 May 2022	Australia
France	Stade Ernest-Wallon	Toulouse	20–22 May 2022	New Zealand

== Standings ==
Due to the impacts of the COVID-19 pandemic, World Rugby revised the method used for the series standings in the interest of fairness to teams not able to participate in all rounds of the 2021–22 season. This system excluded the two lowest-scored rounds from each team in the final standings. So, with six tournaments in the series, only the best four tournament results for each team contributed to the ranking points.

The points awarded to teams at each event, as well as the overall season totals, are shown in the table below. Gold indicates the event champions, silver indicates the event runner-ups and bronze indicates the event third place finishers. An asterisk (*) indicates a tied placing. An obelisk (^{†}) is recorded in the event column where a low-scoring round is excluded from a core team's ranking points. A dash (—) is recorded in the event column if a team did not compete at a tournament.

2021–22 World Rugby Sevens – Women's Series IX
Pos.	Event Team	Dubai I	Dubai II	Málaga	Seville	Langford	Toulouse	Points total	Ranking points (Note: The ranking points contains only the total of points for the four best tournaments (for each team, respectively))	Points difference (Note: The points difference is the margin of points scored for and against (from all matches in only the four best tournaments for each team, respectively))
1	Australia	20	20	16^{†}	20	20	18^{†}	114	80	+544
2	France	16	16	14	12^{†}	14	12^{†}	84	60	+280
3	Fiji (Note: Fiji withdrew from both events in Spain following positive COVID-19 tests in their squad. The team was not replaced for Málaga, however, and their opponents advanced by walkover in that tournament. As such, Fiji was placed twelfth in Málaga, despite not playing, and received one point toward their season standings.)	18	18	—^{1†}	—^{†}	8	16	61	60	+137
4	Ireland	4^{†}	8^{†}	12	18	16	14	72	60	+101
5	New Zealand (Note: New Zealand missed the first four tournaments due to travel logistics and travel-related restrictions from the COVID-19 pandemic. The New Zealand team missed two-thirds of the season and the methodology used to calculate the team's points for the series is yet to be clarified. However, it seems that New Zealand's points for the series were increased by one-half, from 38 points to 57.)	—^{†}	—^{†}	—	—	16	20	38	57	+262
6	United States	8^{†}	12	20	14	10	8^{†}	72	56	+128
7	Canada	6^{†}	6^{†}	10	8	12	10	52	40	–57
8	~~Russia~~ (Note: Russia competed at the first four events but was banned from the remainder of the series on 28 February 2022, after the Russian invasion of Ukraine. As the team was suspended for one-third of the season, Russia's points for the series were reduced by one-third, from 56 points to 37.)	14	14	18	10	—	—	56	37	–14
9	England (Note: Great Britain represented England, Scotland and Wales in 2021 for the first two events of the series in Dubai. In 2022, England and Scotland competed in their own right. England, as a core team, received half of the points earned by Great Britain in the first two rounds: six points for Dubai I, and two points for Dubai II.)	—^{6}	—^{2†}	8	16	3	1^{†}	40	33	–56
10	Spain	3^{†}	10	4	6	6	2^{†}	31	26	–227
11	Brazil	10	4^{†}	2^{†}	4	4	6	30	24	–31
12	Great Britain	12	3	—	—	—	—	15	15	–44
13	Poland	—	—	6	3	—	—	9	9	–91
14	Belgium	—	—	3	2	—	—	5	5	–169
15	Scotland	—	—	—	—	—	4	4	4	–46
16	South Africa	—	—	—	—	—	3	3	3	–143
17	Japan	—	—	—	—	2	—	2	2	–54
18	Portugal	—	—	—	1	—	—	1	1	–211
19	Mexico	—	—	—	—	1	—	1	1	–228

Source: World Rugby

Event medalists
Gold	Event Champions
Silver	Event Runner-ups
Bronze	Event Third place finishers
Qualification for the 2022–23 World Rugby Women's Sevens Series
No colour	Core team in 2021–22 and re-qualified as a core team for the following season
Black	Banned from participating in the 2021–22 series from 28 February 2022 onwards
Yellow	Invited team

== Placings summary ==
Tallies of top four tournament placings during the 2021–22 series, by team:

Team	(gold) Gold	(silver) Silver	(bronze) Bronze	Fourth	Total
Australia	4	1	1	—	6
New Zealand	1	1	—	—	2
United States	1	—	—	1	2
Fiji	—	2	1	—	3
Russia	—	1	—	2	3
Ireland	—	1	1	1	3
France	—	—	2	2	4
England	—	—	1	—	1

== Statistics ==
=== Points ===
Tries scored
Rank	Player	Tries
1	Amee-Leigh Murphy Crowe	36
2	Charlotte Caslick	31
3	Faith Nathan	29
4	Thalia Costa	26
5	Maddison Levi	24
5	Joanna Grisez	24
7	Alowesi Nakoci	23
8	Jade Ulutule	20
9	Jaz Gray	18
9	Reapi Ulunisau	18

Points scored
Rank	Player	Points
1	Jade Ulutule	226
2	Amee-Leigh Murphy Crowe	180
3	Lucy Mulhall	169
4	Charlotte Caslick	155
5	Faith Nathan	145
6	Thalia Costa	130
7	Sharni Williams	121
8	Maddison Levi	120
8	Joanna Grisez	120
10	Alowesi Nakoci	115

Updated: 22 May 2022

=== Performance ===
Impact Player winner
Event	Player	Points
Dubai I	Charlotte Caslick	55
Dubai II	Charlotte Caslick	75
Málaga	Séraphine Okemba	71
Seville	Karolina Jaszczyszyn	92
Langford	Reapi Ulunisau	80
Toulouse	Charlotte Caslick	75

Total Impact Player points
Rank	Player	T	B	O	C	Total
1	Charlotte Caslick	87	27	38	159	403
2	Lucy Mulhall	84	18	15	160	328
3	Amee-Leigh Murphy Crowe	48	37	21	121	322
4	Faith Nathan	68	30	9	85	261
5	Ilona Maher	58	16	20	109	255
6	Reapi Ulunisau	43	18	25	82	229
7	Madison Ashby	81	10	16	84	227
8	Thalia Costa	38	24	9	94	222
9	Jade Ulutule	58	17	17	72	215
10	Alowesi Nakoci	38	23	18	66	209

Key: T = Tackles (1 pt), B = Line breaks (3 pts), O = Offloads (2 pts), C = Carries (1 pt)

Updated: 22 May 2022

== Tournaments ==
=== Dubai I ===
Event	Winner	Score	Finalist
Cup	Australia	22–7	Fiji
Bronze	France	40–0	Russia
5th Place	Great Britain	22–21	Brazil
7th Place	United States	17–7	Canada
9th Place	Ireland	31–14	Spain

=== Dubai II ===
Event	Winner	Score	Finalist
Cup	Australia	15–5	Fiji
Bronze	France	28–5	Russia
5th Place	United States	7–5	Spain
7th Place	Ireland	26–12	Canada
9th Place	Brazil	26–24	Great Britain

=== Malaga ===
Event	Winner	Score	Finalist
Cup	United States	35–10	Russia
Bronze	Australia	33–7	France
5th Place	Ireland	26–5	Canada
7th Place	England	22–10	Poland
9th Place	Spain	17–5	Belgium
11th Place	Brazil	0–0	~~Fiji~~

=== Seville ===
Event	Winner	Score	Finalist
Cup	Australia	17–12	Ireland
Bronze	England	19–12	United States
5th Place	France	26–10	Russia
7th Place	Canada	21–5	Spain
9th Place	Brazil	17–5	Poland
11th Place	Belgium	40–7	Portugal

=== Langford ===
Event	Winner	Score	Finalist
Cup	Australia	21–17	New Zealand
Bronze	Ireland	22–14	France
5th Place	Canada	12–7	United States
7th Place	Fiji	26–7	Spain
9th Place	Brazil	24–7	England
11th Place	Japan	45–0	Mexico

=== Toulouse ===
Event	Winner	Score	Finalist
Cup	New Zealand	21–14	Australia
Bronze	Fiji	26–10	Ireland
5th Place	France	19–14	Canada
7th Place	United States	15–7	Brazil
9th Place	Scotland	24–10	South Africa
11th Place	Spain	26–14	England

== See also ==
- 2021–22 World Rugby Sevens Series (for men's teams)
- Rugby sevens at the 2020 Summer Olympics (held in 2021)
