= Rafaela Zanellato =

Brazilian rugby sevens player

Personal information
- Born: 25 November 1999 (age 25); Curitiba, Brazil

Sport
- Sport: Rugby sevens

Rafaela Zanellato (born 25 November 1999) is a Brazilian rugby sevens player. She competed in the women's tournament at the 2020 Summer Olympics.
