= Master of Advanced Studies in Sports Administration =

A Master of Advanced Studies in Sport Administration degree is classified as a Master of Advanced Studies (MAS) which, according to the Bologna Education System (see Bologna Process), is a post-graduate programme meeting the needs of working professionals and as such falls in the category of continuing education or professional development.

An MSA typically runs between 12 and 18 months and applies a trans-disciplinary approach covering several disciplines (management, law, economics, sociology, technology, medicine, etc.) with a strong practical, hands-on component to the education process.

Participants to an MSA, typically come from the working world and already have several years of professional experience before starting the programme.

The notion of having sport management specific education to better prepare the future sport administrators started to emerge in the 1990s.
