= Leila Cássia Silva =

Brazilian rugby sevens player

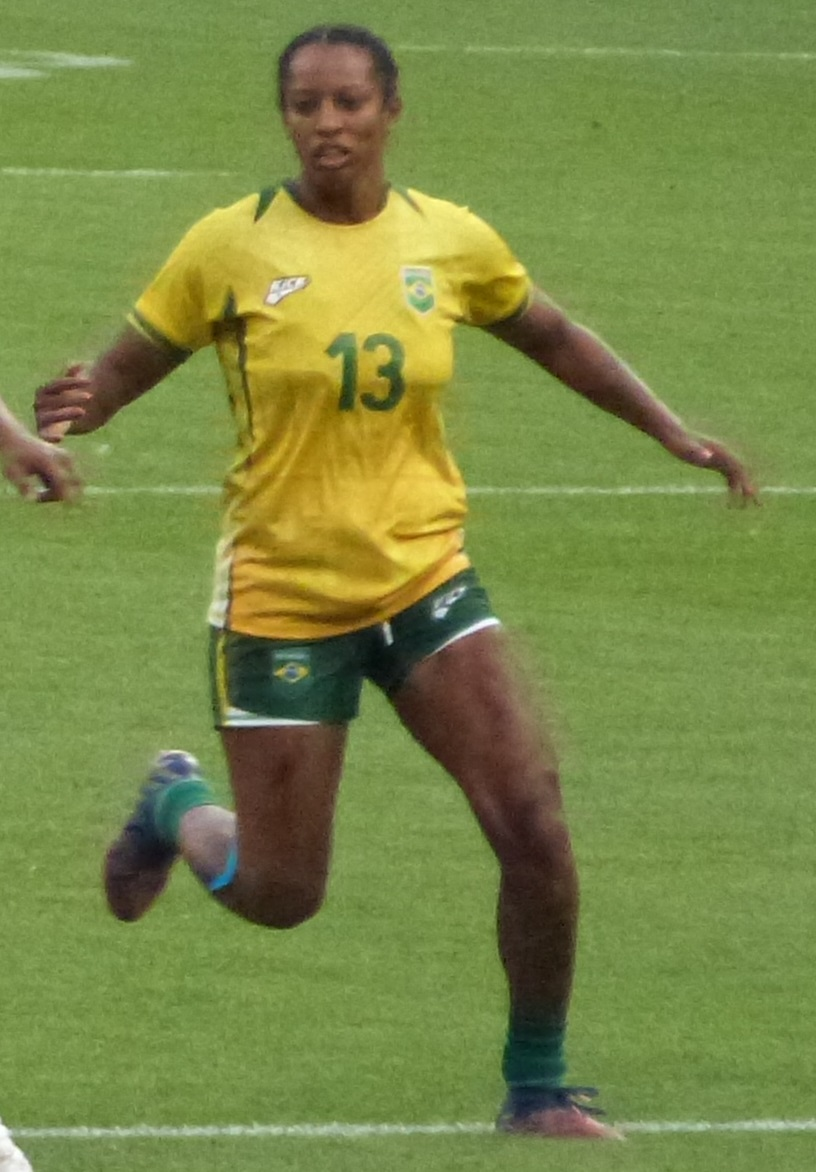
- Silva, during Brazil's match against Fiji at the 2024 Summer Olympics
- Full name: Leila Cássia dos Santos Silva
- Born: 23 October 1996 (age 30)
- Height: 161 cm (5 ft 3 in)

Rugby union career
- Position: Scrum-half
Senior career
Years	Team	Apps	(Points)
	Leoas de Paraisópolis		(0)
International career
Years	Team	Apps	(Points)
2025–	Brazil	5	(0)
National sevens team
Years	Team		Comps
?–	Brazil		

Leila Cássia dos Santos Silva (born 23 October 1996) is a Brazilian rugby union and rugby sevens player.

== Rugby career ==
Silva competed in the 2020 Summer Olympics. She represented Brazil at the 2022 Rugby World Cup Sevens in Cape Town, they placed eleventh overall.

She was originally named as a traveling reserve for Brazil, but competed at the 2024 Summer Olympics in Paris.

In 2025, she was named in Brazil's squad for the Women's Rugby World Cup in England.
