= Coralie Bertrand =

French rugby union player

- Full name: Coralie Isabelle Bertrand
- Born: 10 April 1994 (age 32) Avignon, France
- Height: 1.73 m (5 ft 8 in)
- Weight: 66 kg (146 lb)

Rugby union career
Senior career
Years	Team	Apps	(Points)
- RC Chilly Mazarin
National sevens team
Years	Team		Comps
2020	France 7s		
Medal record
Women's rugby sevens
Representing France
Olympic Games
Silver medal – second place	2020 Tokyo	Team competition

Coralie Isabelle Bertrand (born 10 April 1994) is a French rugby union and rugby sevens player.

She plays 15-a-side rugby for RC Chilly Mazarin in France. She was named in the France squad for the Rugby sevens at the 2020 Summer Olympics.
