= Iera Echebarría =

Spanish rugby player

- Full name: Iera Echebarría Fernández
- Born: 20 October 1992 (age 34) Madrid, Spain
- Height: 1.60 m (5 ft 3 in)
- Weight: 63 kg (139 lb)

Rugby union career
Senior career
Years	Team	Apps	(Points)
2017-2021	Olímpico RC		
2021-2022	Eibar RT		
2022-Now	Olímpico RC		
International career
Years	Team	Apps	(Points)
	Spain	24	
National sevens team
Years	Team		Comps
	Spain		163 (165 pts)

Iera Echebarría Fernández (born 20 October 1992) is a Spanish rugby sevens player. She also plays for Olímpico RC.

She competed for Spain at the 2016 Summer Olympics in Brazil. She was a member of the Spanish women's sevens squad. She was part of the squad that secured the final Olympic spot for the Rio Olympics.

Echebarría competed at the 2022 Rugby World Cup Sevens in Cape Town.
