= Daria Noritsina =

Russian rugby sevens player

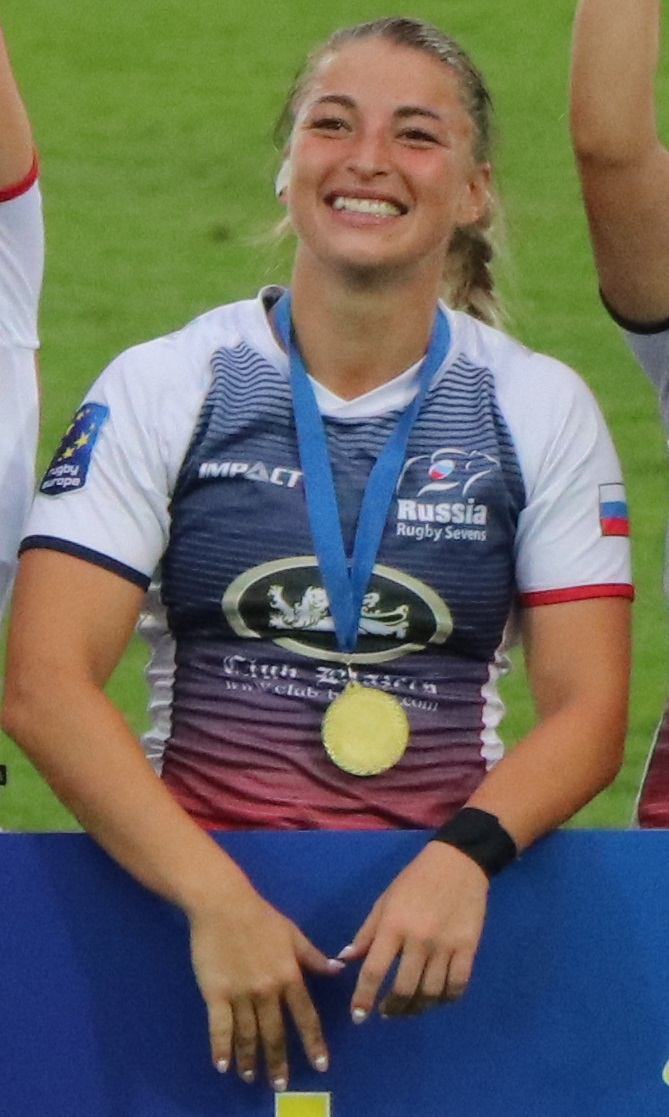
- Full name: Daria Sergeevna Noritsina
- Born: 20 July 1996 (age 30) Perm, Russia
- Height: 1.65 m (5 ft 5 in)
- Weight: 66 kg (146 lb)

Rugby union career
National sevens team
Years	Team	Comps
2016–Present	Russia	98 (100 pts)

Daria Sergeevna Noritsina (Russian: Дарья Сергеевна Норицына; born 20 July 1996) is a Russian rugby sevens player. She competed in the women's tournament at the 2020 Summer Olympics.
