= Nakisa Levale =

Canadian rugby sevens player

- Born: 12 March 1997 (age 29)
- Height: 1.77 m (5 ft 10 in)
- Weight: 72 kg (159 lb)

Rugby union career
National sevens team
Years	Team	Comps
2021–Present	Canada	

Nakisa Levale (born 12 March 1997) is a Canadian rugby sevens player. She was named in Canada's sevens team and competed at the 2022 Commonwealth Games in Birmingham. Her side lost to New Zealand in the bronze medal match and finished fourth overall.

Levale competed for Canada at the 2022 Rugby World Cup Sevens in Cape Town. They placed sixth overall after losing to Fiji in the fifth place final.
