= Tia Hinds =

Australian rugby union player

- Born: 5 November 2002 (age 24) Sydney, Australia
- Height: 1.68 m (5 ft 6 in)
- Weight: 70 kg (154 lb)

Rugby union career
- Position: Fly-half
Super Rugby
Years	Team	Apps	(Points)
2025	ACT Brumbies		(0)
International career
Years	Team	Apps	(Points)
2025–	Australia	10	(0)
National sevens team
Years	Team		Comps
2022–	Australia		113 (479 points)
- Correct as of 8 May 2025
Medal record
Women's rugby sevens
Representing Australia
Rugby Sevens World Cup
Gold medal – first place	2022 Cape Town	Team competition
Commonwealth Games
Gold medal – first place	2022 Birmingham	Team competition

Tia Hinds (born 5 November 2002) is an Australian rugby union player and two-time Olympian.

== Rugby career ==
=== Sevens ===
Hinds was named in the Australia squad for the Rugby sevens at the 2020 Summer Olympics. The team came second in the pool round but then lost to Fiji 14–12 in the quarterfinals.

Hinds won a gold medal with the Australian sevens team at the 2022 Commonwealth Games in Birmingham. She was a member of the Australian team that won the 2022 Sevens Rugby World Cup held in Cape Town, South Africa in September 2022.

2024 Summer Olympics

In 2024, Hinds was named in Australia's sevens side for the sevens tournament at the Summer Olympics in Paris. With 22 points from 11 conversions from 19 attempts, Hinds was Australia's second highest points scorer at the tournament. A missed conversion in the bronze medal match allowed the US to win the match when they scored a last-minute converted try.

=== XVs ===
Hinds made her international fifteens debut for the Wallaroos against Fiji on 3 May 2025 at the HFC Bank Stadium in Suva. She was named in the side for the 2025 Women's Rugby World Cup in England.
