= Elissa Alarie =

Canadian rugby union player

- Born: 31 January 1986 (age 40) Trois-Rivières, Quebec, Canada
- Height: 1.70 m (5 ft 7 in)
- Weight: 64 kg (141 lb)

Rugby union career
- Position: Fullback
Amateur team(s)
Years	Team	Apps	(Points)
?-2012	Ste Anne de Bellevue RFC		
2012-	Velox Valkyries		
Provincial / State sides
Years	Team	Apps	(Points)
- Quebec
International career
Years	Team	Apps	(Points)
–	Canada under-19		
2013–present	Canada	43	
- Correct as of 16 November 2018
National sevens team
Years	Team		Comps
2013-2016?	Canada		
Medal record
Women's rugby union
Representing Canada
World Cup
Silver medal – second place	2014 France	Team competition

Elissa Alarie (born 31 January 1986) is a Canadian rugby union player. She represented Canada at the 2014 Women's Rugby World Cup.

== Rugby career ==
=== Sevens career ===
In 2013, she was included in the Canada's sevens teams to the 2013 Hong Kong Sevens and 2013 China Women's Sevens. The latter was the third leg of 2012–13 IRB Women's Sevens World Series. In 2016, she was also chosen for Canada's first women's rugby sevens Olympic Team.

In June 2021, Alarie was selected for Canada's 2020 Summer Olympics team. She is openly lesbian.

=== Rugby Fifteens career ===
Alarie was named in Canada's squad to the 2021 Rugby World Cup in New Zealand.
