= Julianne Zussman =

Canadian rugby union player and referee

- Born: January 23, 1987 (age 39) Ottawa, Ontario
- Height: 1.68 m (5 ft 6 in)
- Weight: 64 kg (141 lb)
- University: McGill University; AISTS

Rugby union career
- Position(s): Flyhalf, Fullback
Amateur team(s)
Years	Team	Apps	(Points)
–	Town of Mount Royal RFC		
–	McGill Martlets		
–	Velox Valhallians		
–	Castaway Wanderers		
Provincial / State sides
Years	Team	Apps	(Points)
–	Rugby Quebec		
International career
Years	Team	Apps	(Points)
2007-2018	Canada	44	(108)
National sevens team
Years	Team		Comps
2008	Canada		
Coaching career
- Years: Team
- –: Victoria Vikes
Medal record
Women's rugby union
Representing Canada
World Cup
Silver medal – second place	2014 France	Team competition

Julianne Zussman (born January 23, 1987) is a Canadian rugby union referee and a former player. She represented Canada at three World Cups. She was named as fullback on the dream team of the 2014 Women's Rugby World Cup. In 2016, she was the recipient of the Gillian Florence Award from Rugby Canada. She is the assistant coach of the University of Victoria women's rugby program.

Zussman attended McGill University, where she attained a Bachelor of Arts degree in international development. During university she was named the RSEQ rookie-of-the-year in 2004 and an all-conference status in 2005. She completed her master's in sport administration (MSA) at the AISTS in Switzerland.

Zussman has played rugby for the Town of Mount Royal RFC and the Castaway Wanderers.
