= Nicole Heavirland =

American rugby union player

Personal information
- Born: February 25, 1995 (age 31) Whitefish, Montana, U.S.
- Education: Phillips Exeter Academy; Army West Point
- Height: 5 ft 5 in (165 cm)
- Weight: 145 lb (66 kg)

Rugby union career
- Position(s): Fly half, Scrum half
International career
Years	Team	Apps	(Points)
2017	United States	7	
National sevens team
Years	Team		Comps
	United States		3
Medal record
Women's rugby sevens
Representing United States
Pan American Games
Silver medal – second place	2015 Toronto	Team competition

Nicole Heavirland (born February 25, 1995) is an American rugby union player. She made her debut for the United States in 2017. She was named in the Eagles 2017 Women's Rugby World Cup squad.

== Biography ==
Heavirland attended Glacier High School in her junior year before she transferred to Phillips Exeter Academy. She began playing rugby at the age of 15. She made her rugby sevens debut during the 2015–16 World Rugby Women's Sevens Series. She travelled as a reserve to the 2016 Brazil Olympics. She was a USA Rugby All-American at the United States Military Academy.

Heavirland was among 12 players selected to represent Team USA at the Tokyo 2020 Olympic Games. She was again selected to represent the United States at the 2022 Rugby World Cup Sevens in Cape Town. Heavirland was a travelling alternate at the 2024 Summer Olympics in Paris, France. She did not receive a medal due to her status as an alternate which resulted in not playing in any of the matches.

She played for the Boston Banshees in the 2025 Women's Elite Rugby season.

She came out as gay in March 2022.
