= Yolaine Yengo =

French rugby sevens player (born 1993)

- Born: 24 April 1993 (age 33) Tadine, New Caledonia
- Height: 1.61 m (5 ft 3 in)
- Weight: 60 kg (132 lb)

Rugby union career
National sevens team
Years	Team	Comps
2019–Present	France	103 (273 pts)
Medal record
Women's rugby sevens
Representing France
Rugby World Cup Sevens
Bronze medal – third place	2022 Cape Town	Team competition

Yolaine Yengo (born 24 April 1993) is a French rugby union and sevens player. She plays for the University of Rennes and for Stade Rennais Rugby.

== Rugby career ==
Yengo competed for the New Caledonian sevens team at the 2015 Pacific Games. She was selected as a member of the France women's national rugby sevens team at the 2021 Dubai Women's Sevens. She won a bronze medal at the 2022 Rugby World Cup Sevens.

She competed for France at the 2024 Summer Olympics.
