= Grace Crompton =

English rugby union and sevens player

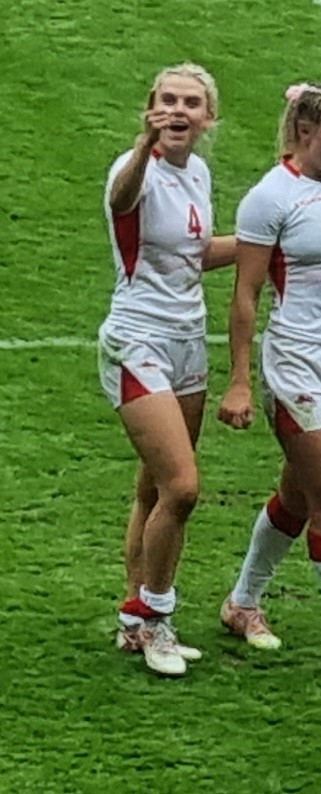
- Born: 30 October 2001 (age 25) London

Rugby union career
Senior career
Years	Team	Apps	(Points)
-2024	Bristol Bears Women		
2024-	Harlequins Women		
International career
Years	Team	Apps	(Points)
2021 -	England		
2023 -	Great Britain		

Grace Crompton (born 30 October 2001) is an English rugby union player who plays for Bristol Bears Women and the Great Britain women's national rugby sevens team, having also played for England sevens.

== Early and personal life ==
Crompton is the granddaughter of Welsh-born actor Hywel Bennett and broadcaster Cathy McGowan and step granddaughter of singer Michael Ball. She was educated at Epsom College in Surrey before attending the University of Bath, where she studied Sports Management and Coaching.

== Club career ==
In March 2023, Crompton scored a hat-trick of tries for Bristol Bears Women in the Premier 15s against Loughborough Lightning. In July 2024, she signed for Harlequins Women, a side that she has previously been involved with as a youth player.

== International career ==
Crompton scored two tries on her England debut, and six in the tournament as a whole, as England ultimately won gold in the HSBC Sevens Women's Fast Four competition held in Vancouver, Canada, in her first international competition in September 2021.

Crompton was selected to play for England at the 2022 Commonwealth Games in rugby sevens. She was named in the England squad for the 2022 Rugby World Cup Sevens – Women's tournament held in Cape Town, South Africa in September 2022.

In June 2024, she was named in the British squad for the 2024 Paris Olympics, and was the youngest player selected for the squad. The team finished seventh.

She was selected for the Great Britain national rugby sevens team for the 2024-25 SVNS series which began at the Dubai Sevens on 30 November 2024. Her efforts included a hat trick of tries against Ireland at the Singapore Sevens in March 2025.
