= Gabriela Lima =

Brazilian rugby sevens player (born 1994)

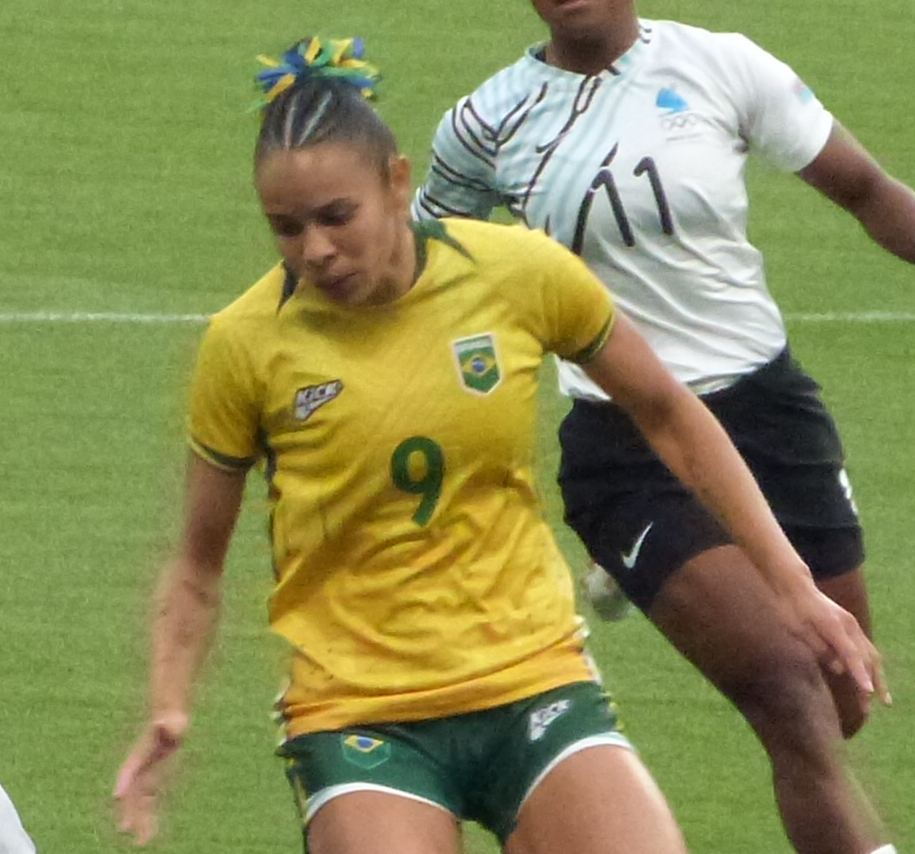
- 2024 Summer Olympics
- Born: 2 August 1994 (age 32)
- Height: 1.71 m (5 ft 7 in)
- Weight: 65 kg (143 lb)

Rugby union career
National sevens team
Years	Team	Comps
	Brazil	27 (85 pts)

Gabriela de Farias Lima (born 2 August 1994) is a Brazilian rugby sevens player.

== Rugby career ==
Lima represented Brazil at the 2022 Rugby World Cup Sevens in Cape Town. They defeated Spain 19–17 in the 11th-place final to finish eleventh overall. She was part of the Brazilian side that won a bronze medal at the 2023 Pan American Games in Santiago, Chile.

She was named in the Brazilian women's sevens team that will compete at the 2024 Summer Olympics in Paris.
