= Amee-Leigh Costigan =

Irish rugby sevens and rugby union player

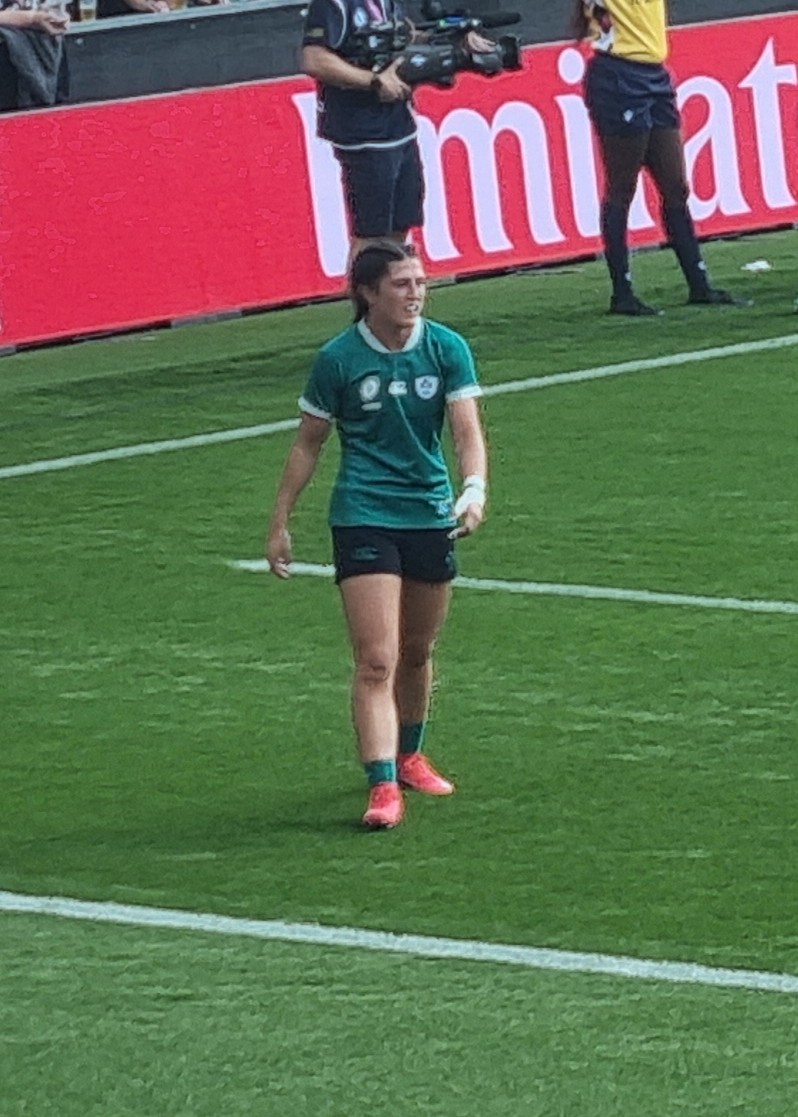
- Costigan during the 2025 Rugby World Cup in Northampton
- Born: 26 April 1995 (age 31) County Tipperary, Ireland
- Height: 1.68 m (5 ft 6 in)
- Weight: 64 kg (141 lb)

Rugby union career
- Position: Winger
Senior career
Years	Team	Apps	(Points)
2013–2015	Munster		
?–	Railway Union		
2020–	Munster		
- Correct as of 17:59, 14 June 2021 (UTC)
International career
Years	Team	Apps	(Points)
2021–	Ireland	23	(50)
- Correct as of 7 September 2025
National sevens team
Years	Team		Comps
2014–	Ireland		Sevens Series
- Correct as of 17:59, 14 June 2021 (UTC)

Amee-Leigh Costigan (née Murphy Crowe; born 26 April 1995) is an Irish rugby sevens and rugby union player, who has represented Ireland in both formats. At club level, she has played for Munster 15s and Railway Union. Murphy Crowe was the leading try scorer at the 2018–19 World Rugby Women's Sevens Series.

== Club career ==
As a youngster, Murphy Crowe participated in athletics, and competed in the 100 metres and long jump in Tipperary. Aged 15, Murphy Crowe started playing rugby in Clanwilliam FC. She plays as a winger.

In 2012, Murphy Crowe joined Munster Rugby's women's under-18 team. Aged 18, Murphy Crowe joined their senior team, where she played rugby union (15s rugby). She has also played club rugby for Railway Union. She was part of the Railway Union team that won the 2019 All-Ireland final. In 2020, Murphy Crowe returned to playing 15s rugby, as rugby sevens matches were on hold due to the COVID-19 pandemic. She had not played 15s rugby since the 2014–15 season.

== International career ==
=== Rugby sevens ===
In 2013, Murphy Crowe played sevens rugby for Ireland under-19s, and was in training camps with the senior team. Murphy Crowe made her debut for the Ireland senior team at the 2014 China Women's Sevens in Guangzhou, China. She scored four tries on the first day of the 2017 Canada Women's Sevens. Murphy Crowe played in the 2018 Rugby World Cup Sevens, where she scored two tries in Ireland's round of 16 match against England, which helped them progress to the quarter-finals.

In Ireland's 2018 Dubai Women's Sevens match against New Zealand, Murphy Crowe scored three tries. At the 2019 Sydney Women's Sevens, Murphy Crowe scored for Ireland in their match against Spain, as Ireland reached their first Sevens Series semi-final. She scored a try in the semi-final, as Ireland lost 22–7 to Australia. She also scored a hat-trick against Fiji at the 2019 Japan Women's Sevens. Murphy Crowe was the leading try scorer at the 2018–19 World Rugby Women's Sevens Series, becoming the first woman not from Australia or New Zealand to achieve the feat. She scored a total of 35 tries in the competition. She was additionally named in the tournament's Dream Team. As of 2021, Murphy Crowe had made 131 appearances for Ireland sevens team, scoring 98 tries. She was the top try scorer in the 2021–22 World Rugby Women's Sevens Series. She scored 36 tries in the 2021–22 World Rugby Women's Sevens Series, the most of any player. She was nominated for World Rugby women's sevens player of the year in 2022. She made her 50th appearance for Ireland 7s at the 2022 Dubai Women's Sevens.

In 2024, She competed for Ireland at the Summer Olympics in Paris.

=== Rugby union ===
Murphy Crowe was called up to the Ireland 15s team for the 2021 Women's Six Nations Championship; she was one of five uncapped rugby sevens players in the squad. She was selected as a substitute for Ireland's match against France, and made her debut in the match. She was sin binned for a high tackle. She made her first start for Ireland in the third-place playoff match against Italy; she scored two tries as Ireland won 25–5. She played in Ireland's 2021 Rugby World Cup qualifying matches, as they failed to qualify for the main tournament. Later in 2021, she played in a match against the United States. As of December 2022, Murphy-Crowe had made nine appearances for the Ireland 15s team.

She was selected in Ireland's squad for the 2025 Six Nations Championship in March.

In April 2025 she was selected as Ireland's captain for the first time in the 2025 Six Nations Championship against England. It was announced in August that she was as a member of the Irish squad to the Rugby World Cup in England.

== Personal life ==
Murphy Crowe is the eldest of five children. Growing up, she attended St.Anne's Secondary School, in Tipperary Town, and later went on to study in Setanta College, Thurles. She is from a small village called Lattin in County Tipperary, Munster, Republic of Ireland. She currently resides in South Dublin.

She married Neil Costigan at Kilkea Castle in Castledermot in November 2024.
