= Dominique du Toit =

Australia international rugby union & league player

- Born: 19 May 1997 (age 29) Marondera, Zimbabwe
- Height: 1.67 m (5 ft 6 in)
- Weight: 56 kg (123 lb)

Rugby union career
National sevens team
Years	Team	Comps
2016–24	Australia	96
- Rugby league career

Playing information
Club
Years	Team	Pld	T	G	FG	P
2024–	Cronulla-Sutherland Sharks	3	1	0	0	4
- As of 13 November 2026
Medal record
Women's rugby sevens
Representing Australia
Rugby Sevens World Cup
Gold medal – first place	2022 Cape Town	Team competition
Commonwealth Games
Gold medal – first place	2022 Birmingham	Team competition
Silver medal – second place	2018 Gold Coast	Team competition

Dominique du Toit (born 19 May 1997) is an Australian rugby league player. She previously represented Australia in rugby sevens. She joined the Cronulla-Sutherland Sharks during the 2024 NRLW season, making her debut in round 7 against the Sydney Roosters.

== Career ==
=== Rugby union ===
Du Toit was born in Maronderra, Zimbabwe. She has represented Australia at the 2014 Summer Youth Olympics and the Commonwealth Youth Games. She also competed at the 2015 Pacific Games in Papua New Guinea.

Du Toit made her debut for the Australian sevens team at the 2016 USA Women's Sevens in Atlanta. She was selected for the Australian squad for the 2016 Olympics as an injury reserve.

Du Toit was named in the Australia squad for the Rugby sevens at the 2020 Summer Olympics. The team came second in the pool round but then lost to Fiji 14–12 in the quarterfinals.

In 2022, Du Toit won a gold medal with the Australian sevens team at the 2022 Commonwealth Games in Birmingham. She was a member of the Australian team that won the 2022 Sevens Rugby World Cup held in Cape Town, South Africa in September 2022.

She was named in the Australian squad for the 2024 Summer Olympics in Paris.

=== Rugby league ===
Du Toit signed with the Cronulla-Sutherland Sharks for the 2024 NRLW season.

== Personal life ==
In 2016 she made a guest appearance as herself on the Australian television show Neighbours.
