= Jade Ulutule =

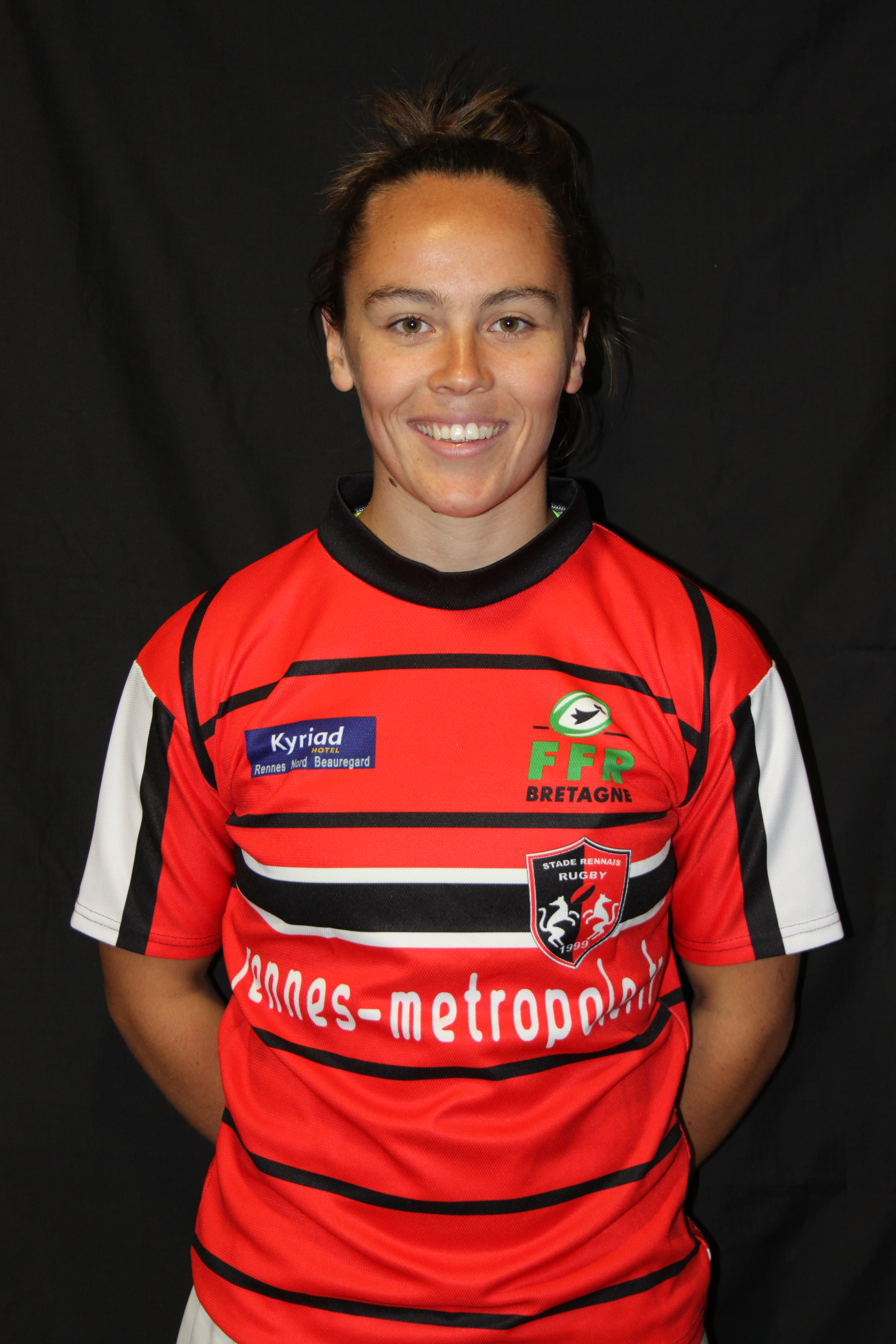
- Born: 12 October 1992 (age 34) Fécamp, Seine-Maritime, France
- Height: 1.63 m (5 ft 4 in)
- Weight: 63 kg (139 lb)

Rugby union career
- Position: Scrum half
Senior career
Years	Team	Apps	(Points)
2007–2024	Stade Rennais		
Provincial / State sides
Years	Team	Apps	(Points)
2012	Auckland	7	(55)
International career
Years	Team	Apps	(Points)
2013–	France	9	(0)
National sevens team
Years	Team		Comps
2013–2024	France 7s		136 (579 pts)
Medal record
Women's rugby sevens
Representing France
Olympic Games
Silver medal – second place	2020 Tokyo	Team competition
Rugby World Cup Sevens
Bronze medal – third place	2022 Cape Town	Team competition

Jade Ulutule (née Le Pesq, born 12 October 1992) is a former French rugby sevens player.

== Biography ==
Ulutule played for the Auckland Storm in the 2012 Women's Provincial Championship in New Zealand.

Ulutule was selected as a member of the France women's national rugby sevens team to the 2016 Summer Olympics. She was part of the French team that won the 2018 Six Nations Championship. She also competed at the 2020 Summer Olympics and won a silver medal.

In 2021, She played for the French fifteens team at the Six Nations Championship. She was in the starting line-up when they routed Ireland 56–15. She also featured in their defeat to England in the Six Nations title match.

Ulutule captained the side that won a bronze medal at the 2022 Rugby World Cup Sevens in Cape Town.
