= List of Asian Games medalists in rugby union =

Asian Games Rugby medalists

This is the complete list of Asian Games medalists in rugby union from 1998 to 2026.

== Rugby union ==
=== Men ===
| Games | Gold | Silver | Bronze |
|---|---|---|---|
| 1998 Bangkok | South Korea (KOR); An Jin-hwan; Baek In-sung; Choi Hyun-min; Chun Jong-man; Han Young-hoon; Kang Dong-ho; Kim Dong-sun; Kim Hyung-ki; Kim Jae-hyun; Kim Jae-sung; Kim Jin-heung; Kim Kwang-jae; Kim Kyung-woo; Kim Sung-nam; Kwak Chul-woong; Lee Je-kil; Lee Keun-wook; Lim Sung-soo; No Chul-ki; Park Jin-bae; Sung Hae-kyung; Woo Tae-il; Yong Hwan-myung; Yoo Jung-hyen; Yoo Min-oug; Yoo Min-suk | Japan (JPN); Shin Hasegawa; Takafumi Hirao; Keiji Hirose; Masami Horikoshi; Daisuke Hoshikawa; Takeomi Ito; Tsuyoshi Kinoshita; Atsushi Komura; Masahiro Kunda; Masahiro Kurokawa; Tsutomu Matsuda; Yukio Motoki; Wataru Murata; Ko Nakamura; Naoto Nakamura; Hideki Nanba; Kohei Oguchi; Katsuji Ohara; Daisuke Ohata; Masamitsu Oyabu; Masaaki Sakata; Yoshihiko Sakuraba; Keisuke Sawaki; Takayuki Sugata; Hiroyuki Tanuma; Osami Yatsuhashi | Chinese Taipei (TPE); Chang Chung-wei; Chen Chia-hsin; Chen Wei-chie; Cheng Chi-ho; Cheng Chia-wen; Cheng Yung-hui; Chuang Shih-lung; Ho Chang-lien; Huang Chen-hua; Huang Hung-lung; Huang Yu-ming; Hung Chi-hsiang; Kuo Shan-pen; Lin Fu-lung; Lin Shu-kai; Lin Yen-kuang; Lin Yi-lung; Lin Yi-te; Lu Kuang-jung; Mae Chyan-shuenn; Tsai Yin-chan; Tseng Chi-ming; Wen Kuang-liang; Wu Chih-hsien; Wu Shih-chieh; Yu Cheng-laing |
| 2002 Busan | South Korea (KOR); Baek In-sung; Cho Chul-hyeong; Choi Chang-yeul; Choi Sung-hwan; Chun Jong-man; Han Young-hoon; Kim Dong-sun; Kim Hyung-ki; Kim Jae-sung; Kim Kwang-jae; Kim Kwang-mo; Kim Young-nam; Lee Jin-wook; Lee Kwan-hee; Lee Myung-geun; Park Chang-min; Park Jin-bae; Park Kwang-soo; Park No-young; Park Yong-don; Shin Woo-sik; Sung Hae-kyung; Um Soon-gil; Yong Hwan-myung; Yoo Min-suk; Yun Hi-su | Japan (JPN); Yuichi Hisadomi; Takeomi Ito; Kensuke Iwabuchi; Dai Katsuno; Tsuyoshi Kinoshita; Yoshiyuki Koike; Koichi Kubo; Toru Kurihara; Ryohei Miki; Takuro Miuchi; Yukio Motoki; Keiya Nishimura; Daisuke Ohata; Hirotoki Onozawa; Yuya Saito; Takamasa Sawaguchi; Masahiro Shichinohe; Kenji Shomen; Hiroyuki Tanuma; Ken Tsukagoshi; Shinichi Tsukida; Tetsuya Watanabe; Eiji Yamamoto; Masahito Yamamoto; Hiroki Yamazaki; Takashi Yoshida | Chinese Taipei (TPE); Chang Ching-fong; Chang Wei-cheng; Chen Chen-fu; Chen Chi-chung; Chen Wen-yen; Chen Yu-chen; Hsieh Cheng-chung; Hsieh Wen-kang; Huang Chen-hua; Huang Yu-ming; Hung Chi-hsiang; Lin Wen-cheng; Lin Yi-te; Ling Chang-heng; Pan Chih-ming; Pan Kuei-chih; Sun Cheng-yen; Tien Chung-i; Wang Kuo-feng; Wu Chih-hsien; Wu Chih-wei; Wu Shih-chieh; Yeh Teng-yuan; Yen Hsiang-hua; Yu Fuh-hsin; Yu Po-chin |

== Rugby sevens ==
=== Men ===
| Games | Gold | Silver | Bronze |
|---|---|---|---|
| 1998 Bangkok | South Korea (KOR); Chun Jong-man; Kang Dong-ho; Kim Hyung-ki; Kim Jae-hyun; Kim Jae-sung; Kwak Chul-woong; Lee Keun-wook; Park Jin-bae; Sung Hae-kyung; Yong Hwan-myung; Yoo Jung-hyen; Yoo Min-suk | Japan (JPN); Takafumi Hirao; Keiji Hirose; Takeomi Ito; Tsutomu Matsuda; Yukio Motoki; Wataru Murata; Ko Nakamura; Hideki Nanba; Daisuke Ohata; Keisuke Sawaki; Hiroyuki Tanuma; Osami Yatsuhashi | Thailand (THA); Phongchak Chakshuraksha; Paisak Chueakomhod; Jintawat Jeepetch; Suwat Kaedkeaw; Sorat Klinpirom; Poj Laksanasompong; Samak Marod; Chatree Phaksoontorn; Sahapol Polpathapee; Chanchai Thaenkam; Chartchai Thaipakdee; Chatewut Watcharakhun |
| 2002 Busan | South Korea (KOR); Choi Chang-yeul; Chun Jong-man; Kim Hyung-ki; Kim Jae-sung; Lee Jin-wook; Lee Myung-geun; Park Chang-min; Park Jin-bae; Park No-young; Sung Hae-kyung; Yong Hwan-myung; Yoo Min-suk | Chinese Taipei (TPE); Chang Ching-fong; Chen Chen-fu; Chen Chi-chung; Chen Wen-yen; Huang Chen-hua; Pan Chih-ming; Sun Cheng-yen; Tien Chung-i; Wang Kuo-feng; Wu Chih-hsien; Wu Chih-wei; Wu Shih-chieh | Thailand (THA); Nattawut Aryuwan; Paisak Chueakomhod; Jintawat Jeepetch; Sayan Kaewmoolmuk; Tanyavit Kuasint; Santi Meethavorn; Nattawut Petcharawuthikri; Chatree Phaksoontorn; Sarayuth Thiengtrong; Kitti Wangkanai; Korapong Wongsalungkarn; Nantawat Wongwanichslip |
| 2006 Doha | Japan (JPN); Takeshi Fujiwara; Eiji Yamamoto; Yuki Okuzono; Yusaku Kuwazuru; Hiroki Yoshida; Takashi Sato; Takashi Suzuki; Yusuke Kobuki; Masahiro Tsuiki; Akihito Yamada; Hiroki Yamazaki; Yohei Shinomiya | South Korea (KOR); Lee Kwang-moon; Yoo Min-hyung; Youn Kwon-woo; Yang Young-hun; Yun Hi-su; Kim Hyung-ki; Chae Jae-young; Kim Jong-su; Kwak Chul-woong; Chun Jong-man; You Young-nam; Lee Myung-geun | China (CHN); He Zhongliang; Wang Jiacheng; Sun Tao; Xu Hui; Zhang Zhiqiang; Yuan Feng; Li Yang; Wang Chongyi; Lu Zhuan; Jiang Xuming; Zhang Heng; Liu Kai |
| 2010 Guangzhou | Japan (JPN); Koji Wada; Yasunori Nagatomo; Masahiro Tsuiki; Kotaro Watanabe; Yuta Imamura; Shuetsu Narita; Hiraku Tomoigawa; Takehisa Usuzuki; Tomohiro Semba; Kenji Shomen; Takayuki Yamauchi; Tomoki Kitagawa | Hong Kong (HKG); Simon Leung; Kwok Ka Chun; Mark Wright; Anthony Haynes; Tsang Hing Hung; Jamie Hood; Fan Shun Kei; Edward Haynes; Rowan Varty; Keith Robertson; Sebastian Perkins; Salom Yiu | South Korea (KOR); Youn Kwon-woo; Yoon Tae-il; Han Kun-kyu; Park Wan-yong; Kim Won-yong; Jegal Bin; Chun Jong-man; Kim Hyun-soo; Lee Jung-min; Park Chang-min; Kwak Chul-woong; Yun Hi-su |
| 2014 Incheon | Japan (JPN); Yusaku Kuwazuru; Shota Hagisawa; Michael Leitch; Lepuha Latuila; Makoto Kato; Masakatsu Hikosaka; Katsuyuki Sakai; Takashi Suzuki; Rakuhei Yamashita; Kazushi Hano; Lomano Lemeki; Masaki Watanabe | Hong Kong (HKG); Kwok Ka Chun; Jack Capon; Max Woodward; Michael Coverdale; Cado Lee; Keith Robertson; Alex McQueen; Mark Wright; Rowan Varty; Jamie Hood; Tom McQueen; Salom Yiu | South Korea (KOR); Han Kun-kyu; Yoon Tae-il; Kim Jeong-min; Yang Young-hun; Oh Youn-hyung; Kim Sung-soo; Kim Gwong-min; Kim Hyun-soo; Park Wan-yong; Kim Nam-uk; Jeong Yeon-sik; Lee Yong-seung |
| 2018 Jakarta–Palembang | Hong Kong (HKG); Lee Jones; Michael Coverdale; Max Woodward; Liam Herbert; Jamie Hood; Hugo Stiles; Alessandro Nardoni; Max Denmark; Ben Rimene; Eric Kwok; Cado Lee; Salom Yiu | Japan (JPN); Lote Tuqiri; Tevita Tupou; Taisei Hayashi; Rikiya Oishi; Kameli Soejima; Dai Ozawa; Katsuyuki Sakai; Keisuke Shin; Ryota Kano; Kosuke Hashino; Chihito Matsui; Naoki Motomura | South Korea (KOR); Han Kun-kyu; Kim Jeong-min; Kim Hyun-soo; Chang Yong-heung; Lee Jae-bok; Kim Nam-uk; Jang Jeong-min; Hwang In-jo; Jang Seong-min; Kim Jin-hyeok; Kim Gwong-min; Kim Sung-soo |
| 2022 Hangzhou | Hong Kong (HKG); Max Woodward; Michael Coverdale; Alessandro Nardoni; Max Denmark; James Christie; Liam Doherty; Liam Herbert; Cado Lee; Hugo Stiles; Russell Webb; Salom Yiu; Alex McQueen | South Korea (KOR); Kim Chan-ju; Lee Jin-kyu; Han Kun-kyu; Chang Yong-heung; Kim Nam-uk; Kim Hyun-soo; Jeong Yeon-sik; Park Wan-yong; Lee Geon; Hwang In-jo; Jang Jeong-min; Kim Eui-tae | Japan (JPN); Kippei Ishida; Taichi Yoshizawa; Ryota Kano; Junya Matsumoto; Josua Kerevi; Moeki Fukushi; Kippei Taninaka; Yoshihiro Noguchi; Yu Okudaira; Takamasa Maruo; Taisei Hayashi; Taiga Ishida |
| 2026 Aichi–Nagoya | Hong Kong (HKG); Callum McCullough; Juan Esono Mba Oyana; Alessandro Nardoni; James Christie; Harry Sayers; Cado Lee; Matthew Rickard; Max Denmark; Dafydd Phillips; Julien Bourron; Rory Murdoch Stewart Cox; Matteo Avitabile; Liam Herbert | China (CHN); Li Benshou; Li Xuebin; Wang Xinguo; Huang Aoqi; Song Kaixin; Ma Haoxiang; Xing Shilong; Shan Changshun; Li Zhiheng; Li Zhuojin; Yao Bayaliga; Wang Bao; Yi Zhiwen | Japan (JPN); Tomu Takamoto; Aseri Masivou; Ren Ouchi; Naoya Ogita; Josua Kerevi; Takemichi Nakano; Koki Miyasaka; Toma Shiwachi; Ryodai Shirakuni; Taiki Yamaguchi; Haruhiko Uemura; Yoshiyuki Koga; Riku Tokito |

=== Women ===
| Games | Gold | Silver | Bronze |
|---|---|---|---|
| 2010 Guangzhou | Kazakhstan (KAZ); Olga Kumanikina; Irina Radzivil; Amina Baratova; Olessya Teryayeva; Olga Sazonova; Nigora Nurmatova; Marianna Balashova; Anna Yakovleva; Svetlana Klyuchnikova; Lyudmila Sherer; Irina Amossova; Irina Adler | China (CHN); Bai Ying; Guan Qishi; Sun Tingting; Fan Wenjuan; Gao Yan; Liu Yan; Zhao Xinqi; Wang Qianli; Liu Tingting; Pei Jiawen; Sun Shichao; Wang Yue | Thailand (THA); Naritsara Worakitsirikun; Prima Jusom; Tidarat Sawatnam; Aoychai Tummawat; Rungrat Maineiwklang; Piyamat Chomphumee; Chitchanok Yusri; Rasamee Sisongkham; Uthumporn Liamrat; Butsaya Bunrak; Phanthippha Wongwangchan; Jeeraporn Peerabunanon |
| 2014 Incheon | China (CHN); Guan Qishi; Yang Hong; Liu Yang; Yang Min; Yu Xiaoming; Sun Tingting; Lu Yuanyuan; Chen Keyi; Jiang Qianqian; Sun Shichao; Zhou Lilian; Yu Liping | Japan (JPN); Chiharu Nakamura; Aya Takeuchi; Noriko Taniguchi; Makiko Tomita; Mifuyu Koide; Chisato Yokoo; Keiko Kato; Yuka Kanematsu; Rei Yamada; Marie Yamaguchi; Ano Kuwai; Yoko Suzuki | Kazakhstan (KAZ); Veronika Stepanyuga; Yelena Yevdokimova; Oxana Shadrina; Lyudmila Sapronova; Amina Baratova; Marianna Balashova; Kundyzay Baktybayeva; Anna Yakovleva; Symbat Zhamankulova; Svetlana Klyuchnikova; Liliya Bazyaruk; Nigora Nurmatova |
| 2018 Jakarta–Palembang | Japan (JPN); Chiharu Nakamura; Noriko Taniguchi; Raichel Bativakalolo; Yume Okuroda; Fumiko Otake; Riho Kurogi; Tomomi Kozasa; Iroha Nagata; Yukari Tateyama; Yume Hirano; Ano Kuwai; Emii Tanaka | China (CHN); Lu Yuanyuan; Yang Min; Chen Ming; Hu Yu; Yan Meiling; Wang Wanyu; Chen Keyi; Liu Xiaoqian; Yu Xiaoming; Yu Liping; Gao Yueying; Sun Caihong | Kazakhstan (KAZ); Veronika Stepanyuga; Nigora Nurmatova; Karina Proskurina; Yeva Bekker; Vlada Odnoletok; Olessya Teryayeva; Kundyzay Baktybayeva; Anna Yakovleva; Svetlana Klyuchnikova; Balzhan Koishybayeva; Darya Tkachyova; Lyudmila Korotkikh |
| 2022 Hangzhou | China (CHN); Yan Meiling; Xu Xiaoyan; Gu Yaoyao; Wang Wanyu; Chen Keyi; Wu Juan; Yang Feifei; Liao Jiuli; Liu Xiaoqian; Hu Yu; Dou Xinrong; Zhou Yan | Japan (JPN); Chiharu Nakamura; Marin Kajiki; Fumiko Otake; Emii Tanaka; Chiaki Saegusa; Mei Otani; Yume Hirano; Rinka Matsuda; Honoka Tsutsumi; Yukino Tsujisaki; Wakaba Hara; Michiyo Suda | Hong Kong (HKG); Shanna Forrest; Au Yeung Sin Yi; Chloe Chan; Natasha Olson-Thorne; Melody Li; Nam Ka Man; Ho Tsz Wun; Fung Hoi Ching; Jessica Ho; Stephanie Chan; Agnes Tse; Chong Ka Yan |
| 2026 Aichi–Nagoya | Japan (JPN); Chiaki Saegusa; Honoka Tsutsumi; Marin Kajiki; Yume Hirano; Hanako Utsumi; Hana Nagata; Mei Otani; Mayu Yoshino; Natsuki Ouchida; Wakana Akita; Michiyo Suda; Sakurako Yazaki; Himawari Matsuda | China (CHN); Wang Wanyu; Chen Keyi; Hu Yu; Zheng Wenyan; Dou Xinrong; Sun Yue; Chen Can; Ma Xiaodan; Chen Ziying; Wang Zhaojing; Zhang Le; Qian Xin; Gao Xiaoyang | Hong Kong (HKG); Shanna Forrest; Chloe Chan; Au Yeung Sin Yi; Julia Mba Oyana; Nam Ka Man; Natasha Olson-Thorne; Agnes Chan; Jessica Ho; Au King To; Stephanie Chan; Chong Ka Yan; Emrin Baltazar; Gabriella Rivers |
