= Rugby sevens at the 2026 Asian Games =

- Venue: Paloma Mizuho Rugby Stadium
- Dates: 1–3 October 2026
- Competitors: 260 from 13 nations

The Rugby sevens tournament at the 2026 Asian Games will be held between 1 and 3 October 2026 at Paloma Mizuho Rugby Stadium. In this tournament, twelve teams will participate in men's competition and eight teams will participate in women's competition.

== Schedule ==
The schedule is as follows:

P	Preliminary round	¼	Quarterfinals	½	Semifinals	F	Finals

Event↓/Date →	1st Thu	2nd Fri		3rd Sat	
Men	P	P	¼	½	F
Women	P	P		½	F

== Participation summary ==
Nation	Men's	Women's	Athletes
China	Yes	Yes	26
Hong Kong	Yes	Yes	26
India	—N/a	Yes	13
Japan	Yes	Yes	26
Kazakhstan	Yes	Yes	26
Malaysia	Yes	Yes	26
Philippines	Yes	—N/a	13
Singapore	Yes	Yes	26
South Korea	Yes	—N/a	13
Sri Lanka	Yes	—N/a	13
Thailand	Yes	Yes	26
United Arab Emirates	Yes	—N/a	13
Uzbekistan	Yes	—N/a	13
Total: 13 NOCs	12	8	260

== Medal table ==
Rank	Nation	Gold	Silver	Bronze	Total
1	Hong Kong (HKG)	1	0	1	2
1	Japan (JPN)	1	0	1	2
3	China (CHN)	0	2	0	2
Totals (3 entries)		2	2	2	6

== Medalists ==
Event	Gold	Silver	Bronze
Men	Hong Kong; Callum McCullough; Juan Esono Mba Oyana; Alessandro Nardoni; James Christie; Harry Sayers; Cado Lee; Matthew Rickard; Max Denmark; Dafydd Phillips; Julien Bourron; Rory Murdoch Stewart Cox; Matteo Avitabile; Liam Herbert	China; Li Benshou; Li Xuebin; Wang Xinguo; Huang Aoqi; Song Kaixin; Ma Haoxiang; Xing Shilong; Shan Changshun; Li Zhiheng; Li Zhuojin; Yao Bayaliga; Wang Bao; Yi Zhiwen	Japan; Tomu Takamoto; Aseri Masivou; Ren Ouchi; Naoya Ogita; Josua Kerevi; Takemichi Nakano; Koki Miyasaka; Toma Shiwachi; Ryodai Shirakuni; Taiki Yamaguchi; Haruhiko Uemura; Yoshiyuki Koga; Riku Tokito
Women	Japan; Chiaki Saegusa; Honoka Tsutsumi; Marin Kajiki; Yume Hirano; Hanako Utsumi; Hana Nagata; Mei Otani; Mayu Yoshino; Natsuki Ouchida; Wakana Akita; Michiyo Suda; Sakurako Yazaki; Himawari Matsuda	China; Wang Wanyu; Chen Keyi; Hu Yu; Zheng Wenyan; Dou Xinrong; Sun Yue; Chen Can; Ma Xiaodan; Chen Ziying; Wang Zhaojing; Zhang Le; Qian Xin; Gao Xiaoyang	Hong Kong; Shanna Forrest; Chloe Chan; Au Yeung Sin Yi; Julia Mba Oyana; Nam Ka Man; Natasha Olson-Thorne; Agnes Chan; Jessica Ho; Au King To; Stephanie Chan; Chong Ka Yan; Emrin Baltazar; Gabriella Rivers

== Draw ==
The draw for the competition was held on 23 July 2026.

=== Men ===
Group A

- Hong Kong
- China
- Malaysia
- Uzbekistan

Group B

- Japan (hosts)
- Thailand
- South Korea
- Kazakhstan

Group C

- Sri Lanka
- United Arab Emirates
- Singapore
- Philippines

=== Women ===
Group A

- Japan (hosts)
- Thailand
- Kazakhstan
- Singapore

Group B

- China
- Hong Kong
- India
- Malaysia
