= Rugby sevens at the 2020 Summer Olympics – Women's team squads =

This article shows the squads of all participating teams for the women's rugby sevens competition at the 2020 Summer Olympics. Each squad could have up to 12 players, however in July 2021, the International Olympic Committee allowed replacements to also compete due to the COVID-19 pandemic. This meant each team could have up to 13 players.

== Group A ==
=== Great Britain ===
Great Britain's squad of 13 players was named on 18 June 2021.

Head coach: Scott Forrest

- (England) Holly Aitchison
- (England) Abbie Brown (c)
- (England) Abi Burton
- (England) Deborah Fleming
- (England) Natasha Hunt
- (England) Megan Jones (c)
- (Wales) Jasmine Joyce
- (England) Alex Matthews
- (England) Celia Quansah
- (England) Helena Rowland
- (Scotland) Hannah Smith
- (Scotland) Lisa Thomson
- (England) Emma Uren

=== Kenya ===
Kenya's squad of 13 players was named on 5 July 2021. Additionally, Enid Ouma was named as a non-travelling reserve athlete.

Head coach: Felix Oloo

- Grace Adhiambo
- Vivian Okwach
- Camilla Atieno
- Judith Okumu
- Sinaida Omondi
- Diana Ochieng
- Sheila Chajira
- Christabel Lindo
- Janet Okelo
- Philadelphia Olando (c)
- Sarah Ndunde
- Stellah Wafula
- Leah Wambui

=== New Zealand ===
New Zealand's squad of 12 players was named on 2 July 2021. Additionally, Tenika Willison, Jazmin Hotham, and Terina Te Tamaki were named as travelling reserve athletes.

Head coach: Allan Bunting

- Michaela Blyde
- Kelly Brazier
- Gayle Broughton
- Theresa Fitzpatrick
- Stacey Fluhler
- Sarah Hirini (c)
- Shiray Kaka
- Tyla Nathan-Wong
- Risi Pouri-Lane
- Alena Saili
- Ruby Tui
- Portia Woodman

=== ROC ===
The ROC's squad of 12 players is as follows.

Head coach: Andrey Kuzin

- Anna Baranchuk
- Iana Danilova
- Baizat Khamidova
- Marina Kukina
- Daria Lushina
- Daria Noritsina
- Mariya Pogrebnyak
- Kristina Seredina
- Daria Shestakova
- Nadezhda Sozonova
- Alena Tiron (c)
- Elena Zdrokova

== Group B ==
=== Brazil ===
Brazil's squad of 12 player was named on 28 June 2021.

Head coach: Will Broderick

- Luiza Campos
- Isadora Cerullo
- Thalia Costa
- Thalita Costa
- Marina Fioravanti
- Aline Furtado
- Raquel Kochhann (c)
- Mariana Nicolau
- Haline Scatrut
- Bianca Silva
- Leila Cássia Silva
- Rafaela Zanellato

=== Canada ===
Canada's squad of 12 players and one alternate was named on 25 June 2021.

Head coach: Mick Byrne

- Elissa Alarie
- Olivia Apps (alternate)
- Britt Benn
- Pamphinette Buisa
- Bianca Farella
- Julia Greenshields
- Ghislaine Landry (c)
- Kaili Lukan
- Kayla Moleschi
- Breanne Nicholas
- Karen Paquin
- Keyara Wardley
- Charity Williams

=== Fiji ===
Fiji's squad of 12 players was named on 6 July 2021. Also Lavenia Tinai, Ana Maria Roqica, and Rejieli Uluinayau were initially named as travelling reserves. However, Tinai and Roqica were added to the squad to replace the injured Tokasa Seniyasi and Uluinayau.

Head coach: Saiasi Fuli

- Lavena Cavuru
- Raijieli Daveua
- Sesenieli Donu
- Laisana Likuceva
- Rusila Nagasau (c)
- Ana Naimasi
- Alowesi Nakoci
- Roela Radiniyavuni
- Viniana Riwai
- Ana Maria Roqica
- Vasiti Solikoviti
- Lavenia Tinai
- Reapi Ulunisau

=== France ===
France's squad of 12 players was named on 5 July 2021. Additionally, Joanna Grisez was named as a replacement.

Head coach: Christophe Reigt

- Coralie Bertrand
- Anne-Cécile Ciofani
- Caroline Drouin
- Camille Grassineau
- Lina Guérin
- Fanny Horta
- Shannon Izar
- Chloé Jacquet
- Carla Neisen
- Séraphine Okemba
- Chloé Pelle
- Jade Ulutule

== Group C ==
=== Australia ===
Australia's squad of 12 players was named on 3 July 2021.

Head coach: John Manenti

- Madison Ashby
- Charlotte Caslick
- Dominique Du Toit
- Demi Hayes
- Tia Hinds
- Maddison Levi
- Faith Nathan
- Sariah Paki
- Shannon Parry (c)
- Evania Pelite
- Emma Tonegato
- Sharni Williams (c)

=== China ===
China's squad of 13 players is as follows.

Head coach: Euan Mackintosh

- Chen Keyi
- Gu Yaoyao
- Liu Xiaoqian
- Ruan Hongting
- Tang Minglin
- Wang Wanyu
- Wu Juan
- Xu Xiaoyan
- Yan Meiling
- Yang Feifei
- Yang Min (c)
- Yu Liping
- Yu Xiaoming

=== Japan ===
Japan's squad of 12 players was named on 19 June 2021.

Head coach: Hare Makiri

- Wakaba Hara
- Yume Hirano
- Haruka Hirotsu
- Marin Kajiki
- Mifuyu Koide
- Mio Yamanaka
- Riho Kurogi
- Hana Nagata
- Mei Ohtani
- Raichel Bativakalolo (c)
- Mayu Shimizu (c)
- Miyu Shirako
- Honoka Tsutsumi

=== United States ===
The United States' squad of 12 players was named on 17 June 2021.

Head coach: Rob Cain

- Kayla Canett-Oca
- Lauren Doyle
- Cheta Emba
- Abby Gustaitis (c)
- Nicole Heavirland
- Alev Kelter
- Kristi Kirshe
- Ilona Maher
- Jordan Matyas
- Ariana Ramsey
- Naya Tapper
- Kristen Thomas (c)
- Nia Toliver
