= Rugby sevens at the 2026 Asian Games – Women's tournament =

Women's rugby sevens at the 2026 Asian Games
- Venues: Paloma Mizuho Rugby Stadium
- Dates: 1–3 October 2026
- Competitors: 103 from 8 nations

Medalists
gold medal	Japan
silver medal	China
bronze medal	Hong Kong

The women's rugby sevens tournament at the 2026 Asian Games was held in Nagoya, Aichi Prefecture, Japan from 1 to 3 October 2026.

== Squads ==
China	Hong Kong	India	Japan
Wang Wanyu; Chen Keyi; Hu Yu; Zheng Wenyan; Dou Xinrong; Sun Yue; Chen Can; Ma Xiaodan; Chen Ziying; Wang Zhaojing; Zhang Le; Qian Xin; Gao Xiaoyang	Shanna Forrest; Chloe Chan; Au Yeung Sin Yi; Julia Mba Oyana; Nam Ka Man; Natasha Olson; Chan Tsz Ching; Jessica Ho; Au King To; Stephanie Chan; Chong Ka Yan; Emrin Baltazar; Gabriella Rivers	Parbati Hansdah; Shikha Yadav; Ujjwal Ghuge; Amandeep Kaur; Vaishnavi Patil; Bhumika Shukla; Kalyani Patil; Mama Naik; Nirmalya Rout; Sandhyarani Tudu; Dumuni Marndi; Arti Kumari; Sandhya Rai	Chiaki Saegusa; Honoka Tsutsumi; Marin Kajiki; Yume Hirano; Hanako Utsumi; Hana Nagata; Mei Ohtani; Mayu Yoshino; Natsuki Ouchida; Wakana Akita; Michiyo Suda; Sakurako Yazaki; Himawari Matsuda
Kazakhstan	Malaysia	Singapore	Thailand
Alina Askerova; Anzhelika Pichugina; Anna Melnikova; Amina Tulegenova; Yekaterina Kamenkova; Alyona Drobovskaya; Irina Tychinina; Xeniya Kim; Balzhan Koishybayeva; Tatyana Kruchinkina; Ayaulym Bakytpek; Diana Andriyenko; Snezhana Popovich	Dinah Sadali; Norfarahana Aziz; Nur Azizan; Josie Mavcellina Gone; Valerie Juan; Nur Samsubahari; Kajolin Jenisin; Nur Sham; Nur Abdul; Noor Azhar; Nurul Nazri; Nor Mat	Jayne Jing Yi Chan; Pei Sim; Guang Ng; Yuan Teoh; Lu Chen; Hui Chong; Victoria Chew; Pazel Poh; Nur Sabrina Binte Azmi; Pei Ong; Liyana Ong; Choi Yuen; Xuan Ng	Panpassa Jaijarim; Laksina Nawakaew; Thanachporn Wandee; Darin Jantamala; Rattanaporn Wittayaronnayut; Nuntadchaporn Yodya; Wannaree Meechok; Narathip Maneesai; Thanaporn Huankid; Salinda Phaekhwamdee; Phanthira Chaiket; Dion Akwaja; Jirawan Chutrakun

== Schedule ==
The schedule of the tournament is as follows.

G	Group stage	PM	Placing Matches	½	Semi-Finals	B	Bronze Medal Match	F	Gold Medal Match

1st Thu	2nd Fri	3rd Sat			
G	G	PM	½	B	F

== Draw ==
The draw for the rugby sevens competitions were held on 23 July 2026.

Group A
Pos	Team
A1	Japan (hosts)
A2	Thailand
A3	Kazakhstan
A4	Singapore

Group B
Pos	Team
B1	China
B2	Hong Kong
B3	India
B4	Malaysia

== Group stage ==
All times are local, Japan Standard Time (UTC+9).

=== Group A ===
Pos	Team	Pld	W	D	L	PF	PA	PD	Pts	Qualification
1	Japan	3	3	0	0	118	10	+108	9	Semi-finals
2	Thailand	3	2	0	1	69	39	+30	7	Semi-finals
3	Kazakhstan	3	1	0	2	36	76	−40	5	5–8th place semi-finals
4	Singapore	3	0	0	3	5	103	−98	3	5–8th place semi-finals

1 October 2026
11:30

Thailand	28–5	Kazakhstan
Try: Nawakaew (2) 5' c, 12' c Phaekhwamdee 7+' c Akwaja 14+' c Con: Phaekhwamdee (2/2); Meechok (2/2)	Report	Try: Tulegenova 14' m Con: Koishybayeva (0/1)

Paloma Mizuho Rugby Stadium
Referee: Christabelle Mee Lim (Singapore)

1 October 2026
11:55

Japan	36–5	Singapore
Try: Saegusa 1' m Akita 3' m Suda 5' c Ouchida 9' c Nagata 13' m Yazaki 14' c Con: Suda (1/3); Utsumi (1/2); Nagata (1/1)	Report	Try: Chan 8' m Con: Yuen (0/1)

Paloma Mizuho Rugby Stadium
Referee: Lin Wei-ming (Chinese Taipei)

1 October 2026
17:45

Thailand	36–0	Singapore
Try: Nawakaew (3) 2' c, 4' c, 6' c Akwaja 7+' m Yodya 9' m Phaekhwamdee 13' m Con: Meechok (3/5); Phaekhwamdee (0/1)	Report

Paloma Mizuho Rugby Stadium
Referee: Hibiki Ikeda (Japan)

1 October 2026
18:10

Japan	48–0	Kazakhstan
Try: Tsutsumi (2) 2' c, 9' m Ohtani (2) 4' m, 7' m Yoshino 6' c Kajiki (2) 8' c, 12' c Ouchida 14' m Con: Suda (2/4); Utsumi (2/4)	Report

Paloma Mizuho Rugby Stadium
Referee: Sunny Lee (Hong Kong)

2 October 2026
11:30

Kazakhstan	31–0	Singapore
Try: Tulegenova (2) 3' c, 12' m Koishybayeva 5' c Drobovskaya 9' m Tychinina 14+' c Con: Koishybayeva (2/4); Tychinina (1/1)	Report

Paloma Mizuho Rugby Stadium
Referee: Sunny Lee (Hong Kong)

2 October 2026
11:55

Japan	34–5	Thailand
Try: Suda 3' c Yazaki 5' m Kajiki 7' c Tsutsumi (2) 9' m, 14' m Akita 12' m Con: Suda (2/4); Nagata (0/2)	Report	Try: Nawakaew 10' m Con: Phaekhwamdee (0/1)

Paloma Mizuho Rugby Stadium
Referee: Qu Shenggang (China)

=== Group B ===
Pos	Team	Pld	W	D	L	PF	PA	PD	Pts	Qualification
1	China	3	3	0	0	110	15	+95	9	Semi-finals
2	Hong Kong	3	2	0	1	79	43	+36	7	Semi-finals
3	India	3	1	0	2	38	81	−43	5	5–8th place semi-finals
4	Malaysia	3	0	0	3	17	105	−88	3	5–8th place semi-finals

1 October 2026
12:20

Hong Kong	33–7	India
Try: Chong (2) 3' c, 7+' c Rivers 4' c Au Yeung 13' m Olson 14' c Con: Chan S. (3/3); Ho (1/2)	Report	Try: Tudu 10' c Con: Tudu (1/1)

Paloma Mizuho Rugby Stadium
Referee: Hibiki Ikeda (Japan)

1 October 2026
12:45

China	43–0	Malaysia
Try: Zheng 2' c Dou (2) 5' c, 13' m Sun 7' c Chen Z. 8' m Gao 10' c Chen K. 11' m Con: Zheng (1/2); Sun (3/3); Chen K. (0/2)	Report

Paloma Mizuho Rugby Stadium
Referee: Sunny Lee (Hong Kong)

1 October 2026
18:35

Hong Kong	36–12	Malaysia
Try: Olson (2) 1' m, 3' m Au 5' m Chan S. (2) 7' c, 8' c Chan T. 14+' c Con: Chan S. (3/6)	Report	Try: Sham 10' c Samsubahari 12' m Con: Azhar (1/2)

Paloma Mizuho Rugby Stadium
Referee: Koki Yamauchi (Japan)

1 October 2026
19:00

China	43–5	India
Try: Chen C. (2) 3' c, 9' m Dou 5' c Chen K. 7' m Wang W. 11' c Zhang 13' m Gao 14' c Con: Chen K. (2/4); Dou (1/1); Zheng (1/2)	Report	Try: Kumari 2' m Con: Hansdah (0/1)

Paloma Mizuho Rugby Stadium
Referee: Christabelle Mee Lim (Singapore)

2 October 2026
12:20

India	26–5	Malaysia
Try: Kumari 1' c Shukla 3' m Patil K. 5' c Tudu 10' c Con: Tudu (1/2); Shukla (2/2)	Report	Try: Jenisin 14+' m Con: Azhar (0/1)

Paloma Mizuho Rugby Stadium
Referee: Christabelle Mee Lim (Singapore)

2 October 2026
12:45

China	24–10	Hong Kong
Try: Chen C. (2) 2' c, 3' m Dou (2) 7+' c, 10' m Con: Chen K. (2/4)	Report	Try: Chong 4' m Au 14' m Con: Chan S. (0/1); Ho (0/1)

Paloma Mizuho Rugby Stadium
Referee: Hibiki Ikeda (Japan)

== Knockout stage ==
All times are local, Japan Standard Time (UTC+9).

=== Final round ===
Semi-finals
3 October
China	28
Thailand	0
3 October
Hong Kong	12
Japan	27

Gold medal match
3 October
China	5
Japan	10
Bronze medal match
3 October
Thailand	5
Hong Kong	7

5–8th place semi-finals
3 October
India	22
Singapore	5
3 October
Malaysia	7
Kazakhstan	17

Fifth place final
3 October
India	0
Kazakhstan	20
Seventh place final
3 October
Singapore	10
Malaysia	5

=== 5–8th place semi-finals ===
3 October 2026
09:50

India	22–5	Singapore
Try: Rout 2' m Tudu (2) 5' m, 7' c Kaur 14+'; Con: Tudu (0/1); Patil K. (0/1); Shukla (1/1)	Report	Try: Chew 7+' m Con: Yuen (0/1)

Paloma Mizuho Rugby Stadium
Referee: Sunny Lee (Hong Kong)

3 October 2026
10:15

Malaysia	7–17	Kazakhstan
Try: Samsubahari 7+' c Con: Juan (1/1)	Report	Try: Tulegenova (2) 2' c, 11' m Melnikova 5' m Con: Koishybayeva (1/3)

Paloma Mizuho Rugby Stadium
Referee: Christabelle Mee Lim (Singapore)

=== Semi-finals ===
3 October 2026
11:30

China	28–0	Thailand
Try: Chen C. 7' c Chen K. 9' c Gao 12' c Sun 14' c Con: Chen K. (3/3); Sun (1/1)	Report

Paloma Mizuho Rugby Stadium
Referee: Hibiki Ikeda (Japan)

3 October 2026
11:55

Hong Kong	12–27	Japan
Try: Mba Oyana 4' m Rivers 12' c Con: Chan S. (0/1); Rivers (1/1)	Report	Try: Yoshino 1' m Tsutsumi (2) 6' m, 8' m Yazaki 11' m Kajiki 14' c Con: Suda (0/3); Utsumi (1/2)

Paloma Mizuho Rugby Stadium
Referee: Qu Shenggang (China)

=== Seventh place final ===
3 October 2026
16:05

Singapore	10–5	Malaysia
Try: Teoh 7' m Poh 13' m Con: Chan (0/1); Yuen (0/1)	Report	Try: Mat 14+' m Con: Juan (0/1)

Paloma Mizuho Rugby Stadium
Referee: Lin Wei-ming (Chinese Taipei)

=== Fifth place final ===
3 October 2026
16:30

India	0–20	Kazakhstan
	Report	Try: Pichugina 3' m Tulegenova 7+' m Melnikova 10' m Tychinina 14+' m Con: Koishybayeva (0/3); Tychinina (0/1)

Paloma Mizuho Rugby Stadium
Referee: Christabelle Mee Lim (Singapore)

=== Bronze medal match ===
3 October 2026
17:45

Thailand	5–7	Hong Kong
Try: Akwaja 7+' m Con: Meechok (0/1)	Report	Try: Chan C. 2' c Con: Rivers (1/1)

Paloma Mizuho Rugby Stadium
Referee: Hibiki Ikeda (Japan)

=== Gold medal match ===
3 October 2026
18:40

China	5–10	Japan
Try: Zhang 13' m Con: Chen K. (0/1)	Report	Try: Hirano 6' m Kajiki 7' m Con: Suda (0/2)

Paloma Mizuho Rugby Stadium
Referee: Sunny Lee (Hong Kong)

== Final standing ==
Rank	Team	Pld	W	D	L
1st place, gold medalist(s)	Japan	5	5	0	0
2nd place, silver medalist(s)	China	5	4	0	1
3rd place, bronze medalist(s)	Hong Kong	5	3	0	2
4	Thailand	5	2	0	3
5	Kazakhstan	5	3	0	2
6	India	5	2	0	3
7	Singapore	5	1	0	4
8	Malaysia	5	0	0	5
