= Rugby sevens at the 2022 Asian Games =

- Venue: Cangqian Athletics Field
- Dates: 24–26 September 2023
- Competitors: 240 from 15 nations

Rugby sevens at the 2022 Asian Games was held at the Cangqian Campus Field, China over three days from 24 to 26 September 2023.

== Schedule ==
P	Preliminary round	¼	Quarterfinals	½	Semifinals	F	Finals

Event↓/Date →	24th Sun	25th Mon		26th Tue	
Men	P	¼		½	F
Women	P	P	½	F	

== Medalists ==
Event	Gold	Silver	Bronze
Men	Hong Kong; Max Woodward; Michael Coverdale; Alessandro Nardoni; Max Denmark; James Christie; Liam Doherty; Liam Herbert; Cado Lee; Hugo Stiles; Russell Webb; Salom Yiu; Alex McQueen	South Korea; Kim Chan-ju; Lee Jin-kyu; Han Kun-kyu; Chang Yong-heung; Kim Nam-uk; Kim Hyun-soo; Jeong Yeon-sik; Park Wan-yong; Lee Geon; Hwang In-jo; Jang Jeong-min; Kim Eui-tae	Japan; Kippei Ishida; Taichi Yoshizawa; Ryota Kano; Junya Matsumoto; Josua Kerevi; Moeki Fukushi; Kippei Taninaka; Yoshihiro Noguchi; Yu Okudaira; Takamasa Maruo; Taisei Hayashi; Taiga Ishida
Women	China; Yan Meiling; Xu Xiaoyan; Gu Yaoyao; Wang Wanyu; Chen Keyi; Wu Juan; Yang Feifei; Liao Jiuli; Liu Xiaoqian; Hu Yu; Dou Xinrong; Zhou Yan	Japan; Chiharu Nakamura; Marin Kajiki; Fumiko Otake; Emii Tanaka; Chiaki Saegusa; Mei Otani; Yume Hirano; Rinka Matsuda; Honoka Tsutsumi; Yukino Tsujisaki; Wakaba Hara; Michiyo Suda	Hong Kong; Shanna Forrest; Au Yeung Sin Yi; Chloe Chan; Natasha Olson-Thorne; Melody Li; Nam Ka Man; Ho Tsz Wun; Fung Hoi Ching; Jessica Ho; Stephanie Chan; Agnes Tse; Chong Ka Yan

== Medal table ==
Rank	Nation	Gold	Silver	Bronze	Total
1	Hong Kong (HKG)	1	0	1	2
2	China (CHN)	1	0	0	1
3	Japan (JPN)	0	1	1	2
4	South Korea (KOR)	0	1	0	1
Totals (4 entries)		2	2	2	6

== Draw ==
The draw for the competition was done virtually on 22 August 2023.

=== Men ===
The teams were seeded based on their final ranking at the 2022 Asia Rugby Sevens Series.

Pool A

- Hong Kong (1)
- Philippines (6)
- Nepal*

Pool B

- South Korea (2)
- Malaysia (8)*
- Chinese Taipei

Pool C

- Japan (4)
- Singapore (9)
- Thailand

Pool D

- United Arab Emirates (3)
- China (5)
- Afghanistan

* In September 2023, the allocation of the men's groups were reorganized following the late entry of the Sri Lanka national team as the Independent Athletes. The Sri Lanka team competed under the OCA flag just in rugby sevens due to their national rugby federation's suspension. The OCA team replaced Malaysia in Pool B as a 2nd ranked team and Malaysia instead Nepal in Pool A as a 3rd ranked team. Subsequently, Nepal moved to Pool D as a 4th ranked team.

=== Women ===
The teams were seeded based on their final ranking at the 2022 Asia Rugby Women's Sevens Series.

Pool E

- China (1)
- Thailand (3)
- Kazakhstan

Pool F

- Japan (2)
- Hong Kong (4)
- India
- Singapore

== Final standing ==
=== Men ===
Rank	Team	Pld	W	D	L
1st place, gold medalist(s)	Hong Kong	5	5	0	0
2nd place, silver medalist(s)	South Korea	5	4	0	1
3rd place, bronze medalist(s)	Japan	5	4	0	1
4	China	6	4	0	2
5	United Arab Emirates	6	4	0	2
6	Malaysia	5	2	0	3
7	Singapore	5	2	0	3
8	Chinese Taipei	5	1	0	4
9	Philippines	6	3	0	3
10	Independent Athletes	6	3	0	3
11	Thailand	6	3	0	3
12	Afghanistan	6	1	0	5
13	Nepal	6	0	0	6

=== Women ===
Rank	Team	Pld	W	D	L
1st place, gold medalist(s)	China	4	4	0	0
2nd place, silver medalist(s)	Japan	5	4	0	1
3rd place, bronze medalist(s)	Hong Kong	5	3	0	2
4	Thailand	4	1	0	3
5	Kazakhstan	4	2	0	2
6	Singapore	4	1	0	3
7	India	4	0	0	4
