= Rugby sevens at the 2018 Asian Games – Women's tournament =

Women at the 2018 Asian Games
- Venue: Gelora Bung Karno Rugby Field
- Date: 30 August – 1 September 2018
- Competitors: 96 from 8 nations

Medalists
| gold medal | Japan |
| silver medal | China |
| bronze medal | Kazakhstan |

The women's tournament of Rugby sevens at the 2018 Asian Games at Jakarta, Indonesia, was started on 30 August and ended on 1 September 2018. Games were held at the Gelora Bung Karno Rugby Field.

The draw for the competition was done at the JS Luwansa Hotel, Jakarta on 5 July 2018. The draw was conducted by Indonesian Asian Games Organizing Committee (INASGOC) in the presence of general manager Asia Rugby.

== Squads ==
| China | Hong Kong | Indonesia | Japan |
|---|---|---|---|
| Lu Yuanyuan; Yang Min; Chen Ming; Hu Yu; Yan Meiling; Wang Wanyu; Chen Keyi; Liu Xiaoqian; Yu Xiaoming; Yu Liping; Gao Yueying; Sun Caihong | Natasha Olson-Thorne; Nam Ka Man; Agnes Chan; Christy Cheng; Kwong Sau Yan; Melody Li; Jessica Ho; Vivian Poon; Yuen Lok Yee; Stephanie Chan; Chong Ka Yan; Aggie Poon | Regina Fetowin; Fevi Susanti Wateni; Pipit Ayu Lestari; Lesly Adriana Deda; Nadya Silvy Khoirunnisa; Dian Wahyu Saputri; Fanny Givllia Garasati; Tri Sukma Nugraeni; Indri Katerina Lahu; Yesi Oktasari Soni; Veronika Adriana Olua; Serli Angganice Matindas | Chiharu Nakamura; Noriko Taniguchi; Raichel Bativakalolo; Yume Okuroda; Fumiko Otake; Riho Kurogi; Tomomi Kozasa; Iroha Nagata; Yukari Tateyama; Yume Hirano; Ano Kuwai; Emii Tanaka |
| Kazakhstan | Singapore | South Korea | Thailand |
| Veronika Stepanyuga; Nigora Nurmatova; Karina Proskurina; Yeva Bekker; Vlada Odnoletok; Olessya Teryayeva; Kundyzay Baktybayeva; Anna Yakovleva; Svetlana Klyuchnikova; Balzhan Koishybayeva; Darya Tkachyova; Lyudmila Korotkikh | Chan Jia Yu; Sim Chiew Hong; Ong Pei Yi; Eunice Chu; Nur Shuhadah Abdul Gaffor; Jayne Chan; Christabelle Lim; Low Yu Hui; Alvinia Ow Yong; Arra Huab; Rachel Wang; Amanda Ng | Lim Jae-won; Kim Yu-ri; Yang Sol-hee; Seo Bo-hee; Park Seong-bin; Lee Min-hui; Gwon Seul-gi; Shin Ye-lim; Baek Ji-eun; Heo Kyung-hee; Min Kyung-jin; Park Su-ji | Wannaree Meechok; Ruksina Nawakaew; Thanachporn Wandee; Rasamee Sisongkham; Rattanaporn Wittayaronnayut; Piyamat Chomphumee; Chitchanok Yusri; Jeeraporn Peerabunanon; Uthumporn Liamrat; Butsaya Bunrak; Tidarat Sawatnam; Thanaporn Huankid |

== Results ==
All times are Western Indonesia Time (UTC+07:00)

=== Preliminary round ===
==== Group A ====
| Pos | Team | Pld | W | D | L | PF | PA | PD | Pts | Qualification |
|---|---|---|---|---|---|---|---|---|---|---|
| 1 | China | 3 | 3 | 0 | 0 | 142 | 7 | +135 | 9 | Quarterfinals |
| 2 | Hong Kong | 3 | 2 | 0 | 1 | 71 | 39 | +32 | 7 | Quarterfinals |
| 3 | Singapore | 3 | 1 | 0 | 2 | 29 | 84 | −55 | 5 | Quarterfinals |
| 4 | South Korea | 3 | 0 | 0 | 3 | 17 | 129 | −112 | 3 | Quarterfinals |

Source: Results

30 August
11:00

| China | 69–0 | South Korea |
| Try: Yu X. 2' m Chen K. (3) 3' c, 13' c, 14' m Yang (2) 6' c, 14+' c Wang (2) 7+' c, 8' m Liu (2) 10' m, 10' c Chen M. 13' c Con: Yu X. (2/3); Chen K. (1/2); Chen M. (4/5) |

Gelora Bung Karno Rugby Field, Jakarta
Referee: Patrick Kwok (Hong Kong)

30 August
11:22

| Hong Kong | 26–7 | Singapore |
| Try: Kwong 2' c Olson-Thorne 6' c V. Poon 9' m Chong 10' c Con: V. Poon (2/3); Chong (1/1) | | Try: Low 14+' c Con: Lim (1/1) |

Gelora Bung Karno Rugby Field, Jakarta
Referee: Suguru Kamamuta (Japan)

30 August
14:40

| Singapore | 22–17 | South Korea |
| Try: Sim 2' m Abdul Gaffor 6' c Chan J.Y. 8' m J. Chan 14+' m Con: Ow Yong (0/1); Abdul Gaffor (1/3) | | Try: Gwon 7' c Yang 7+' m Lee 12' m Con: Lee (1/3) |

Gelora Bung Karno Rugby Field, Jakarta
Referee: Phoenix Xu (China)

30 August
15:02

| China | 32–7 | Hong Kong |
| Try: Chen K. (2) 1' m, 9' m Yu X. 4' m Yan 7+' m Liu 12' c Yu L. 13' m Con: Yu X. (1/4); Chen K. (0/1); Chen M. (0/1) | | Try: A. Poon 14' c Con: A. Poon (1/1) |

Gelora Bung Karno Rugby Field, Jakarta
Referee: Sakurako Kawasaki (Japan)

31 August
10:30

| China | 41–0 | Singapore |
| Try: Hu 1' m Liu (2) 7' c, 11' m Chen M. (2) 8' c, 9' m Yan 13' m Lu 14+' c Con: Chen M. (2/5); Yu X. (0/1); Chen K. (1/1) |

Gelora Bung Karno Rugby Field, Jakarta
Referee: Sakurako Kawasaki (Japan)

31 August
10:52

| Hong Kong | 38–0 | South Korea |
| Try: Kwong 1' c Olson-Thorne 3' c Chong (2) 5' m, 7' c S. Chan 12' c V. Poon 14' m Con: S. Chan (4/6) |

Gelora Bung Karno Rugby Field, Jakarta
Referee: Charlie Brown (Ireland)

==== Group B ====
| Pos | Team | Pld | W | D | L | PF | PA | PD | Pts | Qualification |
|---|---|---|---|---|---|---|---|---|---|---|
| 1 | Japan | 3 | 3 | 0 | 0 | 122 | 21 | +101 | 9 | Quarterfinals |
| 2 | Kazakhstan | 3 | 2 | 0 | 1 | 95 | 36 | +59 | 7 | Quarterfinals |
| 3 | Thailand | 3 | 1 | 0 | 2 | 58 | 51 | +7 | 5 | Quarterfinals |
| 4 | Indonesia | 3 | 0 | 0 | 3 | 5 | 172 | −167 | 3 | Quarterfinals |

Source: Results

30 August
11:44

| Japan | 65–0 | Indonesia |
| Try: Otake 2' m Tanaka 4' m Hirano 6' c Nagata (2) 7' m, 7+' m Bativakalolo 8' m Nakamura 9' c Okuroda 10' c Taniguchi 12' c Kurogi (2) 13' c, 14+' m Con: Okuroda (5/9); Nagata (0/1); Bativakalolo (0/1) |

Gelora Bung Karno Rugby Field, Jakarta
Referee: Phoenix Xu (China)

30 August
12:06

| Kazakhstan | 20–5 | Thailand |
| Try: Nurmatova 7' m Korotkikh (3) 7+' m, 8' m, 10' m Con: Baktybayeva (0/2); Nurmatova (0/1) | | Try: Wittayaronnayut 13' m Con: Chomphumee (0/1) |

Gelora Bung Karno Rugby Field, Jakarta
Referee: Sakurako Kawasaki (Japan)

30 August
15:24

| Thailand | 53–5 | Indonesia |
| Try: Bunrak 3' m Yusri (2) 4' m, 7+' m Huankid 7' c Wandee (2) 9' m, 11' m Meechok 12' c Liamrat (2) 13' c, 14+' c Con: Bunrak (4/7); Sawatnam (0/1); Meechok (0/1) | | Try: Lahu 2' m Con: Soni (0/1) |

Gelora Bung Karno Rugby Field, Jakarta
Referee: Craig Chan (Canada)

30 August
15:46

| Japan | 31–21 | Kazakhstan |
| Try: Otake 2' c Okuroda 6' c Hirano 7+' m Nagata 8' c Kozasa 11' m Con: Otake (1/1); Okuroda (2/4) | | Try: Korotkikh (2) 4' c, 12' c Nurmatova 9' c Con: Baktybayeva (3/3) |

Gelora Bung Karno Rugby Field, Jakarta
Referee: Charlie Brown (Ireland)

31 August
11:14

| Japan | 26–0 | Thailand |
| Try: Hirano (2) 5' c, 9' m Nakamura 12' c Kurogi 14' c Con: Okuroda (3/4) |

Gelora Bung Karno Rugby Field, Jakarta
Referee: Phoenix Xu (China)

31 August
11:36

| Kazakhstan | 54–0 | Indonesia |
| Try: Yakovleva 1' m Korotkikh (3) 4' m, 5' c, 6' m Stepanyuga 7+' m Teryayeva 8' m Proskurina 10' m Odnoletok (2) 12' m, 13' c Tkachyova 14' m Con: Baktybayeva (2/7); Nurmatova (0/3) |

Gelora Bung Karno Rugby Field, Jakarta
Referee: Craig Chan (Canada)

=== Final round ===
Quarterfinals
31 August
China | 43
Indonesia | 7
31 August
Hong Kong | 5
Thailand | 17
31 August
Singapore | 0
Kazakhstan | 34
31 August
South Korea | 7
Japan | 35

Semifinals
1 September
China | 29
Thailand | 5
1 September
Kazakhstan | 12
Japan | 26

Gold medal match
1 September
China | 5
Japan | 7
Bronze medal match
1 September
Thailand | 7
Kazakhstan | 29

Semifinals 5th–8th
1 September
Indonesia | 0
Hong Kong | 51
1 September
Singapore | 17
South Korea | 7

Classification 5th–6th
1 September
Hong Kong | 45
Singapore | 0
Classification 7th–8th
1 September
Indonesia | 0
South Korea | 27

==== Quarterfinals ====
31 August
15:02

| China | 43–7 | Indonesia |
| Try: Chen K. (3) 3' c, 5' m, 7' c Liu 8' m Hu 10' c Lu 12' c Wang 14+' m Con: Chen M. (3/5); Chen K. (1/1); Yu X. (0/1) | | Try: Olua 13' c Con: Olua (1/1) |

Gelora Bung Karno Rugby Field, Jakarta
Referee: Leow Wei Liang (Singapore)

31 August
15:24

| Singapore | 0–34 | Kazakhstan |
| | | Try: Korotkikh (2) 1' c, 9' m Nurmatova 3' c Baktybayeva (2) 7+' m, 11' m Tkachyova 14+' m Con: Baktybayeva (2/5); Nurmatova (0/1) |

Gelora Bung Karno Rugby Field, Jakarta
Referee: Sakurako Kawasaki (Japan)

31 August
15:46

| Hong Kong | 5–17 | Thailand |
| Try: V. Poon 6' m Con: S. Chan (0/1) | | Try: Huankid 2' m Chomphumee 10' c Yusri 12' m Con: Bunrak (0/2); Sawatnam (1/1) |

Gelora Bung Karno Rugby Field, Jakarta
Referee: Ai Yoshida (Japan)

31 August
16:08

| South Korea | 7–35 | Japan |
| Try: Lim 11' c Con: Lee (1/1) | | Try: Kurogi (2) 2' m, 10' m Taniguchi 4' m Bativakalolo 5' m Kuwai 7+' m Tanaka 13' m Nakamura 14+' m Con: Tanaka (0/5); Okuroda (0/2) |

Gelora Bung Karno Rugby Field, Jakarta
Referee: Phoenix Xu (China)

==== Semifinals 5th–8th ====
1 September
14:44

| Indonesia | 0–51 | Hong Kong |
| | | Try: A. Chan 3' m S. Chan (3) 4' c, 10' m, 14+' c Ho 6' m Nam 7+' m Chong 9' c Kwong 11' m Olson-Thorne 13' m Con: S. Chan (3/9) |

Gelora Bung Karno Rugby Field, Jakarta
Referee: Phoenix Xu (China)

1 September
15:06

| Singapore | 17–7 | South Korea |
| Try: Sim 6' m Abdul Gaffor 9' m Low 14' c Con: Abdul Gaffor (0/2); Ow Yong (1/1) | | Try: Lim 3' c Con: Lee (1/1) |

Gelora Bung Karno Rugby Field, Jakarta
Referee: Ai Yoshida (Japan)

==== Semifinals ====
1 September
15:28

| China | 29–5 | Thailand |
| Try: Chen K. (2) 3' c, 11' m Yang 9' m Wang 13' m Hu 14+' c Con: Chen K. (1/2); Yu X. (0/1); Yang (0/1); Chen M. (1/1) | | Try: Wittayaronnayut 7' m Con: Bunrak (0/1) |

Gelora Bung Karno Rugby Field, Jakarta
Referee: Sakurako Kawasaki (Japan)

1 September
15:50

| Kazakhstan | 12–26 | Japan |
| Try: Korotkikh (2) 7' m, 12' c Con: Baktybayeva (0/1); Nurmatova (1/1) | | Try: Otake (2) 2' m, 7+' c Okuroda 5' c Penalty try 14' m Con: Okuroda (2/3) |

Gelora Bung Karno Rugby Field, Jakarta
Referee: Craig Chan (Canada)

==== Classification 7th–8th ====
1 September
18:24

| Indonesia | 0–27 | South Korea |
| | | Try: Gwon 2' c Lee (3) 4' m, 8' m, 14+' m Seo 11' m Con: Lee (1/5) |

Gelora Bung Karno Rugby Field, Jakarta
Referee: Leow Wei Liang (Singapore)

==== Classification 5th–6th ====
1 September
19:08

| Hong Kong | 45–0 | Singapore |
| Try: Olson-Thorne (2) 3' m, 14' c Kwong 7' c Chong 7+' m A. Poon 10' c S. Chan 13' c Nam 14+' c Con: S. Chan (3/5); A. Poon (2/2) |

Gelora Bung Karno Rugby Field, Jakarta
Referee: Phoenix Xu (China)

==== Bronze medal match ====
1 September
19:52

| Thailand | 7–29 | Kazakhstan |
| Try: Penalty try 10' m | | Try: Korotkikh (2) 2' c, 7+' m Stepanyuga 4' m Baktybayeva (2) 12' c, 14' m Con: Baktybayeva (2/4); Nurmatova (0/1) |

Gelora Bung Karno Rugby Field, Jakarta
Referee: Ai Yoshida (Japan)

==== Gold medal match ====
1 September
20:40

| China | 5–7 | Japan |
| Try: Chen K. 9' m Con: Chen K. (0/1) | | Try: Hirano 6' c Con: Okuroda (1/1) |

Gelora Bung Karno Rugby Field, Jakarta
Referee: Patrick Kwok (Hong Kong)

== Final standing ==
| Rank | Team | Pld | W | D | L |
|---|---|---|---|---|---|
| 1st place, gold medalist(s) | Japan | 6 | 6 | 0 | 0 |
| 2nd place, silver medalist(s) | China | 6 | 5 | 0 | 1 |
| 3rd place, bronze medalist(s) | Kazakhstan | 6 | 4 | 0 | 2 |
| 4 | Thailand | 6 | 2 | 0 | 4 |
| 5 | Hong Kong | 6 | 4 | 0 | 2 |
| 6 | Singapore | 6 | 2 | 0 | 4 |
| 7 | South Korea | 6 | 1 | 0 | 5 |
| 8 | Indonesia | 6 | 0 | 0 | 6 |
