= Rugby sevens at the 2019 Summer Universiade =

Rugby sevens at the XXX Summer Universiade
- Venues: Ex Nato; L. Moccia Stadium
- Dates: 5–7 July
- Teams: 8 (men); 8 (women)

Rugby sevens was contested at the 2019 Summer Universiade from 5 to 7 July at the Ex Nato and L. Moccia Stadium in Naples and Afragola, Italy.

== Qualification ==
Following the FISU regulations, The maximum of 8 teams in rugby sevens events where the number of entries is larger than the authorised participation level will be selected by

- The entry and the payment of guarantee;
- Those 4 teams finishing top rankings of the previous edition and/or FISU World University Championships will be automatically qualified;
- Those 2 teams finishing bottom rankings of the previous edition and/or FISU World University Championships will be replaced by new applying teams;
- The host is automatically qualified;
- The remaining teams will be selected by wild card system according to geographical, continental representation, FISU ranking and ISF ranking.

=== Qualified teams ===
==== Men's competition ====
| Means of qualification | Date | Venue | Vacancies | Qualified |
|---|---|---|---|---|
| Host country | — | — | 1 | Italy |
| Top four of previous edition of Summer Universiade | 14–17 July 2013 | (Russia) Kazan | 3 | Russia; France; South Africa |
| The best place at the last World University Championships | 12–14 July 2018 | (Namibia) Swakopmund | 1 | Australia |
| Continental Quotas | — | — | 3 | Argentina; Japan; Romania |
| Wild Card | — | — | 1 | Canada |
| Total | | | 8 | |

==== Women's competition ====
| Means of qualification | Date | Venue | Vacancies | Qualified |
|---|---|---|---|---|
| Host country | — | — | 1 | Italy |
| Top three of previous edition of Summer Universiade | 14–17 July 2013 | (Russia) Kazan | 2 | Russia; Canada |
| Top four of previous edition of World University Championships | 12–14 July 2018 | (Namibia) Swakopmund | 3 | France; Belgium; South Africa |
| Continental Quotas | — | — | 2 | Argentina; Japan |
| Total | | | 8 | |

== Draw ==
Following the FISU regulations, draw of pool will be based on following by.

- Previous World University Championships results
- Participation in previous Summer Universiades
- Continental representation
- World Rugby Rankings

=== Men's competition ===
| Pot 1 | Pot 2 | Pot 3 | Pot 4 |
|---|---|---|---|
| South Africa(1); France(3) | Argentina(5); Italy | Russia; Canada | Japan; Romania |

=== Women's competition ===
| Pot 1 | Pot 2 | Pot 3 | Pot 4 |
|---|---|---|---|
| France(1); Belgium(3) | South Africa(4); Canada | Argentina; Japan | Russia; Italy |

== Pools composition ==
| Men's competition | | Women's competition | |
| Pool A | Pool B | Pool A | Pool B |
|---|---|---|---|
| Argentina | France | Canada | Russia |
| Romania | Japan | France | South Africa |
| Russia | Italy | Japan | Belgium |
| South Africa | Canada | Italy | Argentina |

== Medal summary ==
=== Medal table ===
* Host nation (Italy)

| Rank | Nation | Gold | Silver | Bronze | Total |
|---|---|---|---|---|---|
| 1 | Japan (JPN) | 2 | 0 | 0 | 2 |
| 2 | France (FRA) | 0 | 1 | 1 | 2 |
| 3 | South Africa (RSA) | 0 | 1 | 0 | 1 |
| 4 | Russia (RUS) | 0 | 0 | 1 | 1 |
| Totals (4 entries) | | 2 | 2 | 2 | 6 |

=== Medal events ===
| Event | Gold | Silver | Bronze |
|---|---|---|---|
| Men | Japan (JPN); Kentaro Fujii; Masaki Hamada; Seijun Kawasaki; Toshiki Kuwayama; Junya Matsumoto; Kanta Matsunaga; Takanobu Minami; Masahiro Nakano; Hideto Niguma; Yoshihiro Noguchi; Hiroaki Saito; Shotaro Tsuoka | South Africa (RSA); Rohaan Adams; Kurt-Lee Arendse; David Carey; Mervano Da Silva; Gustav Erlank; Lungelo Gosa; Eugene Hare; Johann Kritzinger; Diedrik Oberholzer; Jacobus Smit; Bernard Van Der Linde; Edwin Van Rooyen | France (FRA); Nicolas Baquer; Benjamin Barnerias; Dorian Bellot; Léonard Bouscasse; Lucas Dubois; Arnaud Le Berre; Colin Lebian; Guillaume Manevy; Maëlann Perret-Tourlonias; Antoine Poussin; Raphaël Sanchez; Jordan Sepho |
| Women | Japan (JPN); Raichieru Miyo Bativakalolo; Wakaba Hara; Yume Hirano; Riho Kurogi; Kana Murokoshi; Hana Nagata; Iroha Nagata; Haruna Okada; Mami Shinzaki; Miyu Shirako; Honoka Tsutsumi; Ayumi Yabuuchi | France (FRA); Sarah Aguado; Carla Arbez; Mélissa Bergeron; Émilie Boulard; Océane Buisson; Marie-Aurélie Castel; Julie Coudert; Charlotte Escudero; Manae Feleu; Iän Jason; Meg Mambe; Hada Traore | Russia (RUS); Alina Arterchuk; Alena Dammer; Iana Danilova; Diana Glushenko; Snezhanna Kulkova; Diana Loginova; Daria Lushina; Ekaterina Mikhaleva; Mariia Molokoedova; Daria Noritsina; Kseniia Pozdeeva; Evgeniia Steblinskaia |
