= Rugby sevens at the 2022 Asian Games – Women's tournament =

Asian Games Rugby event

Women at the 2022 Asian Games
- Venue: Cangqian Athletics Field
- Date: 24–26 September 2023
- Competitors: 84 from 7 nations

Medalists
gold medal	China
silver medal	Japan
bronze medal	Hong Kong

The women's tournament of rugby sevens at the 2022 Asian Games was held at the Cangqian Athletics Field, Hangzhou, China from 24 to 26 September 2023.

== Squads ==
China	Hong Kong	India	Japan
Yan Meiling; Xu Xiaoyan; Gu Yaoyao; Wang Wanyu; Chen Keyi; Wu Juan; Yang Feifei; Liao Jiuli; Liu Xiaoqian; Hu Yu; Dou Xinrong; Zhou Yan	Shanna Forrest; Au Yeung Sin Yi; Chloe Chan; Natasha Olson-Thorne; Melody Li; Nam Ka Man; Ho Tsz Wun; Fung Hoi Ching; Jessica Ho; Stephanie Chan; Agnes Tse; Chong Ka Yan	Lachmi Oraon; Shikha Yadav; Vaishnavi Patil; Dumuni Marndi; Tarulata Naik; Sandhya Rai; Sweta Shahi; Mama Naik; Priya Bansal; Sheetal Sharma; Hupi Majhi; Kalyani Patil	Chiharu Nakamura; Marin Kajiki; Fumiko Otake; Emii Tanaka; Chiaki Saegusa; Mei Otani; Yume Hirano; Rinka Matsuda; Honoka Tsutsumi; Yukino Tsujisaki; Wakaba Hara; Michiyo Suda
Kazakhstan	Singapore	Thailand	
Veronika Stepanyuga; Nigora Nurmatova; Yekaterina Savina; Amina Tulegenova; Alyona Drobovskaya; Anna Melnikova; Xeniya Kim; Anzhelika Pichugina; Mariya Grishina; Balzhan Koishybayeva; Diana Abisheva; Lyudmila Sherer	Nicole Tan; Lily Sim; Sherienne Koh; Samantha Teo; Jessie Yuen; Victoria Chew; Chanel Weng; Ong Pei Yi; Daphne Lai; Beverly Lim; Liyana Ong; Eunice Chu	Panpassa Jaijarim; Nuntadchaporn Yodya; Thanachporn Wandee; Salinda Phaekhwamdee; Rattanaporn Wittayaronnayut; Laksina Nawakaew; Passon Jaengjob; Wannaree Meechok; Uthumporn Liamrat; Butsaya Bunrak; Jirawan Chutrakun; Thanaporn Huankid	

== Results ==
All times are China Standard Time (UTC+08:00)

=== Pool round ===
==== Pool E ====
Pos	Team	Pld	W	D	L	PF	PA	PD	Pts	Qualification
1	China	2	2	0	0	80	14	+66	6	Semifinals
2	Thailand	2	1	0	1	22	52	−30	4	Semifinals
3	Kazakhstan	2	0	0	2	12	48	−36	2	Placing 5–7

Source: OCA

24 September
12:05

Thailand	15–5	Kazakhstan
Try: Huankid 3' m Liamrat 12' m Chutrakun 14' m Con: Meechok (0/2); Jaijarim (0/1)		Try: Nurmatova 11' m Con: Koishybayeva (0/1)

Cangqian Athletics Field, Hangzhou
Referee: Ano Kuwai (Japan)

24 September
17:15

China	33–7	Kazakhstan
Try: Yang 3' c Chen (2) 8' m, 11' c Liu 12' c Liao 14' c Con: Gu (2/2); Chen (2/3)		Try: Sherer 6' c Con: Koishybayeva (1/1)

Cangqian Athletics Field, Hangzhou
Referee: Christabelle Lim (Singapore)

25 September
10:25

China	47–7	Thailand
Try: Dou 6' c Liu 7' m Gu 9' c Penalty try 11'; Wang 12' c Chen 13' c Zhou 14+' c Con: Gu (2/3); Chen (2/2); Xu (1/1)		Try: Wittayaronnayut 4' c Con: Jaengjob (1/1)

Cangqian Athletics Field, Hangzhou
Referee: Hibiki Ikeda (Japan)

==== Pool F ====
Pos	Team	Pld	W	D	L	PF	PA	PD	Pts	Qualification
1	Japan	3	3	0	0	124	5	+119	9	Semifinals
2	Hong Kong	3	2	0	1	72	22	+50	7	Semifinals
3	Singapore	3	1	0	2	15	86	−71	5	Placing 5–7
4	India	3	0	0	3	0	98	−98	3	Placing 5–7

Source: OCA

24 September
12:30

Hong Kong	38–0	India
Try: Chong (3) 3' c, 4' m, 10' c Li 6' c Olson-Thorne 8' m Ho T. 14+'c Con: J. Ho (3/5); S. Chan (1/1)

Cangqian Athletics Field, Hangzhou
Referee: Eri Kamimura (Japan)

24 September
12:55

Japan	57–0	Singapore
Try: Otani 1' m Tsutsumi (3) 3' c, 8' c, 12' c Saegusa (2) 6' m, 7+' m Tsujisaki 10' c Hirano 11' c Hara 13' c Con: Suda (1/4); Tanaka (5/5)

Cangqian Athletics Field, Hangzhou
Referee: Noor Jefri Mustafa (Malaysia)

24 September
17:40

Hong Kong	29–0	Singapore
Try: Chong (2) 2' m, 7' c C. Chan 5' m Olson-Thorne 10' c Fung 13' m Con: J. Ho (2/5)

Cangqian Athletics Field, Hangzhou
Referee: Hibiki Ikeda (Japan)

24 September
18:05

Japan	45–0	India
Try: Nakamura (2) 1' m, 5' m Otake 3' c Tsujisaki 6' c Hara 9' c Suda 10' c Otani 13' c Con: Tanaka (3/5); Suda (2/2)

Cangqian Athletics Field, Hangzhou
Referee: Noor Jefri Mustafa (Malaysia)

25 September
10:50

India	0–15	Singapore
		Try: Chew 7+' m Ong 14' m Tan 14+' m Con: Yuen (0/3)

Cangqian Athletics Field, Hangzhou
Referee: Ano Kuwai (Japan)

25 September
11:15

Japan	22–5	Hong Kong
Try: Hara 6' c Suda 9' m Kajiki 13' m Saegusa 14+' m Con: Suda (1/3); Tanaka (0/1)		Try: Chong 4' m Con: J. Ho (0/1)

Cangqian Athletics Field, Hangzhou
Referee: Christabelle Lim (Singapore)

=== Placing 5–7 ===
Placing 7
25 September
Kazakhstan	24
India	7

Placing 5–6
26 September
Kazakhstan	50
Singapore	0

==== Placing 7 ====
25 September
16:00

Kazakhstan	24–7	India
Try: Stepanyuga 2' c Kim 5' m Pichugina 11' c Tulegenova 13' m Con: Koishybayeva (1/2); Abisheva (1/2)		Try: T. Naik 6' c Con: T. Naik (1/1)

Cangqian Athletics Field, Hangzhou
Referee: Eri Kamimura (Japan)

==== Placing 5–6 ====
26 September
12:30

Kazakhstan	50–0	Singapore
Try: Drobovskaya 1' m Stepanyuga (2) 5' c, 7+' m Sherer (2) 6' c, 8' c Koishybayeva 11' c Kim 14' m Tulegenova 14+' c Con: Koishybayeva (4/6); Abisheva (1/2)

Cangqian Athletics Field, Hangzhou
Referee: Hibiki Ikeda (Japan)

=== Final round ===
Semifinals
25 September
China	33
Hong Kong	0
25 September
Japan	26
Thailand	0

Gold medal match
26 September
China	22
Japan	21
Bronze medal match
26 September
Hong Kong	7
Thailand	5

==== Semifinals ====
25 September
16:25

China	33–0	Hong Kong
Try: Yang 1' c Chen (3) 4' c, 7' m, 14' c Wang 7+' c Con: Gu (2/2); Chen (2/3)

Cangqian Athletics Field, Hangzhou
Referee: Ano Kuwai (Japan)

25 September
16:50

Japan	26–0	Thailand
Try: Otani 2' c Kajiki 7+' c Saegusa 9' m Nakamura 13' c Con: Suda (3/4)

Cangqian Athletics Field, Hangzhou
Referee: Christabelle Lim (Singapore)

==== Bronze medal match ====
26 September
16:50

Hong Kong	7–5	Thailand
Try: Chong 5' c Con: J. Ho (1/1)		Try: Huankid 11' m Con: Jaijarim (0/1)

Cangqian Athletics Field, Hangzhou
Referee: Ano Kuwai (Japan)

==== Gold medal match ====
26 September
17:40

China	22–21	Japan
Try: Gu 1' c Wu (2) 4' m, 6' m Zhou 7+' m Con: Chen (1/3); Gu (0/1)		Try: Saegusa 9' c Hirano (2) 11' c, 13' c Con: Suda (3/3)

Cangqian Athletics Field, Hangzhou
Referee: Craig Chan (Canada)

== Final standing ==
Rank	Team	Pld	W	D	L
1st place, gold medalist(s)	China	4	4	0	0
2nd place, silver medalist(s)	Japan	5	4	0	1
3rd place, bronze medalist(s)	Hong Kong	5	3	0	2
4	Thailand	4	1	0	3
5	Kazakhstan	4	2	0	2
6	Singapore	4	1	0	3
7	India	4	0	0	4
