= Rugby sevens at the 2026 Asian Games – Men's tournament =

Men's rugby sevens at the 2026 Asian Games
- Venues: Paloma Mizuho Rugby Stadium
- Dates: 1–3 October 2026
- Competitors: 155 from 12 nations

Medalists
gold medal	Hong Kong
silver medal	China
bronze medal	Japan

The men's rugby sevens tournament at the 2026 Asian Games was held in Nagoya, Aichi Prefecture, Japan from 1 to 3 October 2026.

== Squads ==
China	Hong Kong	Japan	Kazakhstan
Li Benshou; Li Xuebin; Wang Xinguo; Huang Aoqi; Song Kaixin; Ma Haoxiang; Xing Shilong; Shan Changshun; Li Zhiheng; Li Zhuojin; Yao Bayaliga; Wang Bao; Yi Zhiwen	Callum McCullough; Juan Esono Mba Oyana; Alessandro Nardoni; James Christie; Harry Sayers; Cado Lee; Matthew Rickard; Max Denmark; Dafydd Phillips; Julien Bourron; Rory Murdoch Stewart Cox; Matteo Avitabile; Liam Herbert	Tomu Takamoto; Aseri Masivou; Ren Ouchi; Naoya Ogita; Josua Kerevi; Takemichi Nakano; Koki Miyasaka; Toma Shiwachi; Ryodai Shirakuni; Taiki Yamaguchi; Haruhiko Uemura; Yoshiyuki Koga; Riku Tokito	Alexandr Belashov; Rodion Shipitsin; Alexandr Lymar; Danil Tur; Danil Sumskiy; Onlassyn Tursunbek; Nikita Ivanov; Armanzhan Vassilov; Roman Chsherbakov; Khanali Mustafayev; Nikita Sitov; Maxim Petukhov; Alexey Lukmanov
South Korea	Malaysia	Philippines	Singapore
Kim Chan-ju; Lee Jin-kyu; Oh Dong-ho; Chang Yong-heung; Jang Hyung-goo; Kim Sun-jong; Jang Jeong-min; Hwang Jeong-wook; Park Ji-hun; Park Woo-been; Lee Jun-yi; Kim Nam-uk; Lee Moon-gyu	Muhammad Abd Rani; Wan Wan Omar; Muhammad Mohd; Muhamad Sudin; Ammaar Mohamad; Adeen Md Baharudin; Muhammad Md Said; Muhammad Rasli; Muhammad Abdullah; Muhammad Mat Zizi; Muhammad Wahid; Amar Nor Herman; Adam Alias	Edlen Hernandez; Luc Smith; Michael Blatteis; Donald Coleman; Ned Stephenson; Harrison Blake; Robert Fogerty; Kai Stroem; Hamish Seddon; Charles Warren; Raphael Barberis; Jacob Soriano; Jason Schirmer	Jonathan Wong; Gideon Kee; Julian Leow; Muhammad Bin; Daryl Liau; Hidayat Muhammad; Chong Teng; Abdullah Mohammad; Marah Bin; Yu Hong Yau; Adam Vine; Yew Hon Wong; Miguel William
Sri Lanka	Thailand	United Arab Emirates	Uzbekistan
Akash Ravisinghe; Chathura Widanalage; Diluksha Dange; Kangaramulle Ekanayake; Shaahid Ibrahim; Kavindu Thanip; Anuradha Rankothgedara; Pasindu Wijesundara; Jayathu Garumuni; Gayan Kahandathissage; Janidu Balage; Gamunu Kumarasinghe; Devinda Lansakara	Noppasit Kradkrayang; Nakornpon Patiyarnwipas; Ratchanon Chitpavanasakul; Sada Terateanworakit; Chawakorn Siwapreechakul; Chakkarin Sirabanchongkran; Kerdkao Wechokittikorn; Thanachot Anekchin; Thanakit Jakchai; Polsan Phaetrat; Pachara Polpathapee; Adithep Keatpattanachai; Kittikawin Youkasam	Emosi Ratuvecanaua; Martin Mangwiro; Bradley Janes; Niko Volavola; Robert Sproul; Finlay Anderson; Aaron Dubois; Thomas Affley; Mohammed Almarar; Gerard Pieterse; Saeed Saad; Khalifa Khalifa; Yousuf Mohammad	Jahongir Abdukodirov; Murodjon Matchonov; Sobirjon Kholikulov; Azizkhon Nurillaev; Abdulla Khapizboyev; Sergey Sokolov; Makhmud Kalandarov; Sanatbek Rakhimov; Ruslan Ibragimov; Ilya Sokolov; Asadbek Matsapaev; Ulugbek Boev

== Schedule ==
The schedule of the tournament is as follows.

G	Group stage	PM	Placing Matches	¼	Quarter-Finals	½	Semi-Finals	B	Bronze Medal Match	F	Gold Medal Match

1st Thu	2nd Fri			3rd Sat			
G	G	PM	¼	PM	½	B	F

== Draw ==
The draw for the rugby sevens competitions was held on 23 July 2026.

Group A
Pos	Team
A1	Hong Kong
A2	China
A3	Malaysia
A4	Uzbekistan

Group B
Pos	Team
B1	Japan (hosts)
B2	Thailand
B3	South Korea
B4	Kazakhstan

Group C
Pos	Team
C1	Sri Lanka
C2	United Arab Emirates
C3	Singapore
C4	Philippines

== Group stage ==
All times are local, Japan Standard Time (UTC+9).

=== Group A ===
Pos	Team	Pld	W	D	L	PF	PA	PD	Pts	Qualification
1	Hong Kong	3	3	0	0	115	0	+115	9	Quarter-finals
2	China	3	2	0	1	83	43	+40	7	Quarter-finals
3	Malaysia	3	1	0	2	43	81	−38	5	Quarter-finals
4	Uzbekistan	3	0	0	3	0	117	−117	3	

First match(es) will be played: 1 October 2026. Source:

1 October 2026
9:00

China	33–21	Malaysia
Try: Huang 4' m Ma 6' c Shan (2) 6' c, 14' c Xing 11' c Con: Shan (4/5)	Report	Try: Sudin 2' c Mohamad 8' c Nor Herman 13' c Con: Mat Zizi (3/3)

Paloma Mizuho Rugby Stadium
Referee: Koki Yamauchi (Japan)

1 October 2026
9:25

Hong Kong	45–0	Uzbekistan
Try: Avitabile (2) 2' c, 7' c Christie 3' m Stewart Cox (2) 6' c, 11' m Nardoni 12' c Denmark 13' c Con: Bourron (2/4); Avitabile (1/1); Phillips (2/2)	Report

Paloma Mizuho Rugby Stadium
Referee: Leow Wei Liang (Singapore)

1 October 2026
15:15

China	50–0	Uzbekistan
Try: Xing 2' c Ma 5' m Li X. (2) 6' c, 7' c Wang B. 9' m Yao 11' c Li Zhi. 12' c Shan 14+'; Con: Shan (5/7)	Report

Paloma Mizuho Rugby Stadium
Referee: Morgan White (Hong Kong)

1 October 2026
15:40

Hong Kong	48–0	Malaysia
Try: Denmark (2) 2' c, 7+' m Herbert (2) 3' m, 5' m Bourron 10' c Sayers (2) 11' m, 14+' c Stewart Cox 13' c Con: Phillips (2/5); Rickard (2/3)	Report

Paloma Mizuho Rugby Stadium
Referee: Ibuki Tetsuka (Japan)

2 October 2026
9:00

Malaysia	22–0	Uzbekistan
Try: Mohamad 4' m Nor Herman 7'; Mat Zizi 11' c Md Said 14+' m Con: Mat Zizi (1/3)	Report

Paloma Mizuho Rugby Stadium
Referee: Leow Wei Liang (Singapore)

2 October 2026
9:25

Hong Kong	22–0	China
Try: Bourron 2' m Herbert 7+' m Sayers 11' c Lee 14' m Con: Phillips (1/3); Rickard (0/1)	Report

Paloma Mizuho Rugby Stadium
Referee: Koki Yamauchi (Japan)

=== Group B ===
Pos	Team	Pld	W	D	L	PF	PA	PD	Pts	Qualification
1	Japan	3	3	0	0	100	14	+86	9	Quarter-finals
2	South Korea	3	2	0	1	71	36	+35	7	Quarter-finals
3	Kazakhstan	3	1	0	2	17	76	−59	5	
4	Thailand	3	0	0	3	12	74	−62	3	

First match(es) will be played: 1 October 2026. Source:

1 October 2026
9:50

Thailand	7–24	South Korea
Try: Wechokittikorn 12' c Con: Chitpavanasakul (1/1)	Report	Try: Jang J. (2) 4' m, 10' c Oh 7' c Lee M. 14' m Con: Jang H. (2/4)

Paloma Mizuho Rugby Stadium
Referee: Morgan White (Hong Kong)

1 October 2026
10:15

Japan	38–0	Kazakhstan
Try: Nakano 1' m Shiwachi 4' c Tokito 6' c Ouchi 11' c Kerevi 14+' m Ogita 14+' c Con: Shiwachi (2/3); Yamaguchi (2/3)	Report

Paloma Mizuho Rugby Stadium
Referee: Craig Chan (Hong Kong)

1 October 2026
16:05

Thailand	5–12	Kazakhstan
Try: Terateanworakit 5' m Con: Chitpavanasakul (0/1)	Report	Try: Ivanov 7' c Tur 11' m Con: Ivanov (1/1); Tur (0/1)

Paloma Mizuho Rugby Stadium
Referee: Qu Shenggang (China)

1 October 2026
16:30

Japan	24–14	South Korea
Try: Takamoto 1' c Shirakuni 6' c Ogita 10' m Kerevi 13' m Con: Shiwachi (2/3); Yamaguchi (0/1)	Report	Try: Kim S. 3' c Oh 11' c Con: Jang H. (2/2)

Paloma Mizuho Rugby Stadium
Referee: Leow Wei Liang (Singapore)

2 October 2026
9:50

South Korea	33–5	Kazakhstan
Try: Park W. (2) 2' c, 11' m Jang J. (2) 7+' c, 9' c Kim N. 13' c Con: Jang H. (3/3); Kim N. (1/2)	Report	Try: Tur 14+' m Con: Tur (0/1)

Paloma Mizuho Rugby Stadium
Referee: Craig Chan (Hong Kong)

2 October 2026
10:15

Japan	38–0	Thailand
Try: Uemura (2) 2' m, 9' c Ogita 7' c Nakano 8' c Yamaguchi 11' c Miyasaka 14+' m Con: Uemura (3/4); Yamaguchi (1/1); Shiwachi (0/1)	Report

Paloma Mizuho Rugby Stadium
Referee: Leow Wei Liang (Singapore)

=== Group C ===
Pos	Team	Pld	W	D	L	PF	PA	PD	Pts	Qualification
1	Sri Lanka	3	3	0	0	72	36	+36	9	Quarter-finals
2	United Arab Emirates	3	1	1	1	55	39	+16	6	Quarter-finals
3	Philippines	3	1	1	1	62	51	+11	6	Quarter-finals
4	Singapore	3	0	0	3	34	97	−63	3	

First match(es) will be played: 1 October 2026. Source:

1 October 2026
10:40

United Arab Emirates	33–5	Singapore
Try: Volavola 1' c Penalty try 7' c Ratuvecanaua 7+' m Janes 11' c Khalifa 14+' c Con: Volavola (3/3); Dubois (0/1)	Report	Try: Muhammad H. 4' m Con: Muhammad H. (0/1)

Paloma Mizuho Rugby Stadium
Referee: Qu Shenggang (China)

1 October 2026
11:05

Sri Lanka	22–14	Philippines
Try: Widanalage (2) 4' c, 10' m Balage 11' m Rankothgedara 14+' m Con: Rankothgedara (1/2); Ibrahim (0/2)	Report	Try: Coleman 6' c Fogerty 13' c Con: Stroem (2/2)

Paloma Mizuho Rugby Stadium
Referee: Ibuki Tetsuka (Japan)

1 October 2026
16:55

United Arab Emirates	17–17	Philippines
Try: Mangwiro 3' c Pieterse 6' m Volavola 7+' m Con: Volavola (1/2); Dubois (0/1)	Report	Try: Blatteis 5' c Coleman 11' m Seddon 14' m Con: Stroem (1/3)

Paloma Mizuho Rugby Stadium
Referee: Lin Wei-ming (Chinese Taipei)

1 October 2026
17:20

Sri Lanka	33–17	Singapore
Try: Ravisinghe (2) 7' c, 14' m Widanalage 9' c Wijesundara 14' c Lansakara 14+' c Con: Rankothgedara (2/3); Ibrahim (2/2)	Report	Try: Vine 2' m Muhammad H. 6' c Wong J. 13'; Con: Muhammad H. (0/1); Marah (1/1)

Paloma Mizuho Rugby Stadium
Referee: Craig Chan (Hong Kong)

2 October 2026
10:40

Singapore	12–31	Philippines
Try: Muhammad H. 5' c Teng 12' m Con: Muhammad H. (1/1); Teng (0/1)	Report	Try: Blatteis 2' m Barberis 3' m Coleman (2) 7' c, 8' c Stroem 14' c Con: Stroem (3/5)

Paloma Mizuho Rugby Stadium
Referee: Morgan White (Hong Kong)

2 October 2026
11:05

Sri Lanka	17–5	United Arab Emirates
Try: Widanalage 6' m Ibrahim 9' c Wijesundara 11' m Con: Rankothgedara (0/2); Ibrahim (1/1)	Report	Try: Khalifa 14' m Con: Pieterse (0/1)

Paloma Mizuho Rugby Stadium
Referee: Ibuki Tetsuka (Japan)

== Knockout stage ==
=== 9–12th place playoff ===
All times are local, Japan Standard Time (UTC+9).

Pos	Team	Pld	W	D	L	PF	PA	PD	Pts
1	Thailand	3	3	0	0	48	31	+17	9
2	Singapore	3	2	0	1	62	36	+26	7
3	Kazakhstan	3	1	0	2	47	43	+4	5
4	Uzbekistan	3	0	0	3	33	80	−47	3

2 October 2026
13:35

Kazakhstan	35–7	Uzbekistan
Try: Ivanov (2) 4' c, 8' c Petukhov 6' c Tur 7+' c Shipitsin 11' c Con: Ivanov (4/4); Vassilov (1/1)	Report	Try: Sokolov S. 13' c Con: Sokolov S. (1/1)

Paloma Mizuho Rugby Stadium
Referee: Ibuki Tetsuka (Japan)

2 October 2026
14:00

Thailand	17–12	Singapore
Try: Jakchai 7+' c Polpathapee (2) 9' m, 10' m Con: Chitpavanasakul (1/2); Anekchin (0/1)	Report	Try: William 6' c Teng 14' m Con: William (1/1); Muhammad H. (0/1)

Paloma Mizuho Rugby Stadium
Referee: Qu Shenggang (China)

3 October 2026
9:00

Kazakhstan	7–22	Singapore
Try: Tur 2' c Con: Ivanov (1/1)	Report	Try: Muhammad H. 3' m William 7+' c Wong J. 11' m Teng 13' m Con: Muhammad H. (1/2); Teng (0/2)

Paloma Mizuho Rugby Stadium
Referee: Ibuki Tetsuka (Japan)

3 October 2026
9:25

Thailand	17–14	Uzbekistan
Try: Phaetrat 2' m Jakchai 11' m Wechokittikorn 13' c Con: Chitpavanasakul (0/1); Anekchin (1/2)	Report	Try: Kholikulov 6' c Matchonov 8' c Con: Sokolov S. (2/2)

Paloma Mizuho Rugby Stadium
Referee: Craig Chan (Hong Kong)

3 October 2026
15:15

Kazakhstan	5–14	Thailand
Try: Chsherbakov 14+' m Con: Ivanov (0/1)	Report	Try: Jakchai 7+' c Terateanworakit 11' c Con: Anekchin (2/2)

Paloma Mizuho Rugby Stadium
Referee: Morgan White (Hong Kong)

3 October 2026
15:40

Singapore	28–12	Uzbekistan
Try: Wong J. 3' c Vine 8' c Muhammad H. 12' c Leow 14' c Con: Muhammad H. (4/4)	Report	Try: Nurillaev (2) 2' c, 14+' m Con: Kalandarov (1/1); Sokolov S. (0/1)

Paloma Mizuho Rugby Stadium
Referee: Craig Chan (Hong Kong)

=== Final round ===
Quarter-finals
2 October
Hong Kong	50
Malaysia	0
2 October
South Korea	29
United Arab Emirates	12
2 October
Sri Lanka	12
China	19
2 October
Philippines	7
Japan	28

Semi-finals
3 October
Hong Kong	35
South Korea	14
3 October
China	10
Japan	7

Gold medal match
3 October
Hong Kong	26
China	0
Bronze medal match
3 October
South Korea	5
Japan	17

5–8th place semi-finals
3 October
Malaysia	33
United Arab Emirates	5
3 October
Sri Lanka	12
Philippines	33

Fifth place final
3 October
Malaysia	34
Philippines	7
Seventh place final
3 October
United Arab Emirates	5
Sri Lanka	40

=== Quarter-finals ===
2 October 2026
14:25

Hong Kong	50–0	Malaysia
Try: Mba Oyana (3) 1' m, 12' c, 14' c Denmark 2' m Phillips (2) 7+' c, 11' c Rickard 9' c Christie 14+' m Con: Phillips (3/5); Rickard (2/3)	Report

Paloma Mizuho Rugby Stadium
Referee: Koki Yamauchi (Japan)

2 October 2026
14:50

South Korea	29–12	United Arab Emirates
Try: Jang J. (3) 4' c, 7+' m, 14+' m Chang 7' c Kim C. 12' m Con: Jang H. (1/1); Kim N. (1/3); Jang J. (0/1)	Report	Try: Janes 6' m Dubois 11' c Con: Sproul (0/1); Affley (1/1)

Paloma Mizuho Rugby Stadium
Referee: Morgan White (Hong Kong)

2 October 2026
15:15

Sri Lanka	12–19	China
Try: Ekanayake (2) 7+' m, 14+' c Con: Rankothgedara (0/1); Ibrahim (1/1)	Report	Try: Shan (2) 2' c, 6' c Wang B. 11' m Con: Shan (2/3)

Paloma Mizuho Rugby Stadium
Referee: Leow Wei Liang (Singapore)

2 October 2026
15:40

Philippines	7–28	Japan
Try: Barberis 11' c Con: Stroem (1/1)	Report	Try: Tokito (3) 6' c, 7+' c, 14' c Shiwachi 14'; Con: Shiwachi (3/3); Yamaguchi (1/1)

Paloma Mizuho Rugby Stadium
Referee: Lin Wei-ming (Chinese Taipei)

=== 5–8th place semi-finals ===
3 October 2026
10:40

Malaysia	33–5	United Arab Emirates
Try: Nor Herman (3) 4' c, 11' c, 14' m Mohd 13' c Md Said 14+' c Con: Mat Zizi (3/4); Md Baharudin (1/1)	Report	Try: Affley 6' m Con: Dubois (0/1)

Paloma Mizuho Rugby Stadium
Referee: Koki Yamauchi (Japan)

3 October 2026
11:05

Sri Lanka	12–33	Philippines
Try: Kahandathissage 7+' c Wijesundara 11' m Con: Garumuni (1/1); Rankothgedara (0/1)	Report	Try: Stroem 2' c Barberis (2) 4' c, 5' m Seddon 9' c Blatteis 14' c Con: Stroem (4/5)

Paloma Mizuho Rugby Stadium
Referee: Leow Wei Liang (Singapore)

=== Semi-finals ===
3 October 2026
12:20

Hong Kong	35–14	South Korea
Try: Christie 2' c Sayers 7' c Phillips 8' c Denmark 12' c Avitabile 14' c Con: Phillips (4/4); Avitabile (1/1)	Report	Try: Jang J. 10' c Lee M. 13' c Con: Kim S. (1/1); Lee M. (1/1)

Paloma Mizuho Rugby Stadium
Referee: Ibuki Tetsuka (Japan)

3 October 2026
12:45

China	10–7	Japan
Try: Ma 2' m Li Zhu. 7' m Con: Shan (0/2)	Report	Try: Shiwachi 4' c Con: Shiwachi (1/1)

Paloma Mizuho Rugby Stadium
Referee: Craig Chan (Hong Kong)

=== Seventh place final ===
3 October 2026
16:55

United Arab Emirates	5–40	Sri Lanka
Try: Affley 3' m Con: Dubois (0/1)	Report	Try: Wijesundara (2) 6' c, 9' c Thanip 11' c Ibrahim 13' c Rankothgedara 14' c Ravisinghe 14+' m Con: Ibrahim (4/4); Rankothgedara (1/1); Ravisinghe (0/1)

Paloma Mizuho Rugby Stadium
Referee: Qu Shenggang (China)

=== Fifth place final ===
3 October 2026
17:20

Malaysia	34–7	Philippines
Try: Alias 1' c Nor Herman (3) 3' m, 9' m, 14' m Mohamad 7+' m Wahid 12' c Con: Mat Zizi (2/6)	Report	Try: Stroem 6' c Con: Stroem (1/1)

Paloma Mizuho Rugby Stadium
Referee: Koki Yamauchi (Japan)

=== Bronze medal match ===
3 October 2026
18:10

South Korea	5–17	Japan
Try: Lee M. 14+' m Con: Lee M. (0/1)	Report	Try: Tokito 2' m Nakano 6' m Shiwachi 11' c Con: Shiwachi (1/3)

Paloma Mizuho Rugby Stadium
Referee: Morgan White (Hong Kong)

=== Gold medal match ===
3 October 2026
19:10

Hong Kong	26–0	China
Try: Sayers (2) 4' c, 5' c Phillips 7+' c Mba Oyana 8' m Con: Phillips (3/4)	Report

Paloma Mizuho Rugby Stadium
Referee: Leow Wei Liang (Singapore)

== Final standing ==
Rank	Team	Pld	W	D	L
1st place, gold medalist(s)	Hong Kong	6	6	0	0
2nd place, silver medalist(s)	China	6	4	0	2
3rd place, bronze medalist(s)	Japan	6	5	0	1
4	South Korea	6	3	0	3
5	Malaysia	6	3	0	3
6	Philippines	6	2	1	3
7	Sri Lanka	6	4	0	2
8	United Arab Emirates	6	1	1	4
9	Thailand	6	3	0	3
10	Singapore	6	2	0	4
11	Kazakhstan	6	2	0	4
12	Uzbekistan	6	0	0	6
