= Emii Tanaka =

Japanese rugby sevens player

- Born: 19 October 1999 (age 27) Uozu, Toyama, Japan
- Height: 166 cm (5 ft 5 in)
- Weight: 65 kg (143 lb; 10 st 3 lb)

Rugby union career
National sevens team
Years	Team	Comps
2017–Present	Japan	
Medal record
Women's rugby sevens
Representing Japan
Asian Games
Silver medal – second place	2022 Hangzhou	Team
Gold medal – first place	2018 Jakarta–Palembang	Team

Emii Tanaka (born 19 October 1999) is a Japanese rugby sevens player.

== Rugby career ==
Tanaka debuted for Japan at the Japan leg of the 2016–17 Women's Sevens Series in Kitakyushu. She represented Japan at the 2018 Rugby World Cup Sevens. She later won a gold medal at the 2018 Asian Games.

She received a silver medal at the 2022 Asian Games in Hangzhou, China. She competed for Japan in her first Olympics at the 2024 Summer Olympics in Paris.
