= Zhou Yan (rugby union) =

Chinese rugby sevens player

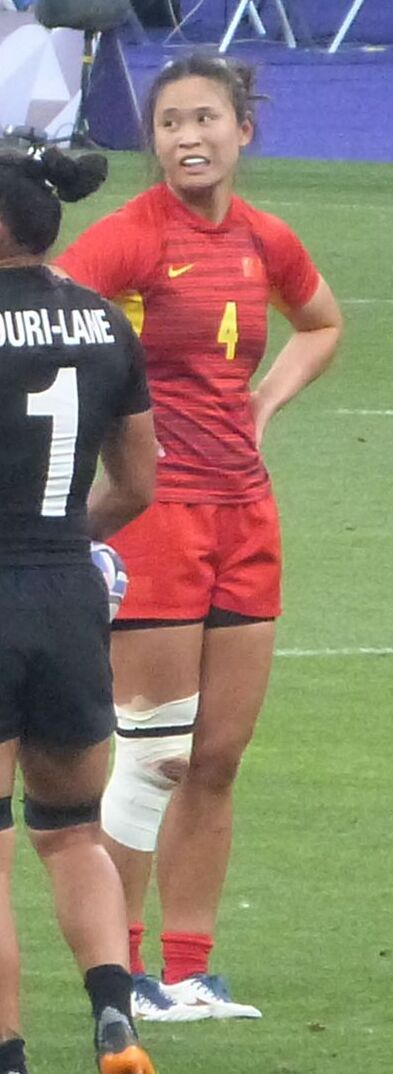
- Zhou Yan at the 2024 Olympics
- Born: 5 June 1998 (age 28)
- Height: 170 cm (5 ft 7 in)
- Weight: 70 kg (154 lb; 11 st 0 lb)

Rugby union career
National sevens team
Years	Team	Comps
2022–Present	China	
Medal record
Women's rugby sevens
Representing China
Asian Games
Gold medal – first place	2022 Hangzhou	Team

Zhou Yan (born 5 June 1998) is a Chinese rugby sevens player.

== Rugby career ==
Zhou participated at the 2022 Rugby World Cup Sevens in Cape Town, South Africa. In 2023, She won a gold medal at the delayed 2022 Asian Games which was held in Hangzhou.

She competed for the Chinese women's sevens team at the 2024 Summer Olympics in Paris.
