= Euan Mackintosh =

- Born: 6 September 1985 (age 41) Inverness

Rugby union career
Amateur team(s)
Years	Team	Apps	(Points)
	Highland RFC		(0)

Euan Mackintosh is a Rugby Coach. He is backs and skills coach for Toshiba Brave Lupus in the Japanese League One. He was the skills coach and assistant coach for the New Zealand All Blacks Sevens. Before coaching in New Zealand Euan was the Assistant coach for Case Rugby St Etienne in France.

== Biography ==
Mackintosh first played rugby at Highland Rugby Club and was on the team at university in Edinburgh where he was studying physical education. He played rugby in New Zealand before going to Australia in 2008. He then played for a semi professional rugby club in France. He began his coaching career at Saint-Étienne.

Mackintosh moved to New Zealand, where he coached at Tauranga Sports Rugby Club in Bay of Plenty. He coached in their Sevens Programme and helped the Under-19s to a national championship.

Mackintosh was appointed as head coach of China's women's national rugby sevens team in 2020 and helped them qualify for their first Olympics. They finished in seventh place.
