= Raichel Bativakalolo =

Japanese rugby sevens player

- Born: 18 September 1997 (age 29) Tokyo, Japan
- Height: 1.61 m (5 ft 3 in)
- Weight: 71 kg (157 lb)

Rugby union career
National sevens team
Years	Team	Comps
	Japan	52
Medal record
Women's rugby sevens
Representing Japan
Asian Games
Gold medal – first place	2018 Jakarta–Palembang	Team

Raichel Bativakalolo (born 18 September 1997) is a Japanese rugby sevens player. She competed in the women's tournament at the 2020 Summer Olympics. She was born in Tokyo to a Fijian father and a Japanese mother.
