= Liu Xiaoqian (rugby union) =

Chinese rugby sevens player

- Born: 16 February 1996 (age 30) Shaoxing, China
- Height: 160 cm (5 ft 3 in)
- Weight: 59 kg (130 lb; 9 st 4 lb)

Rugby union career
National sevens team
Years	Team	Comps
2017–Present	China	
Medal record
Women's rugby sevens
Representing China
Asian Games
Gold medal – first place	2022 Hangzhou	Team
Silver medal – second place	2018 Jakarta–Palembang	Team

Liu Xiaoqian (born 16 February 1996) is a Chinese rugby sevens player.

== Rugby career ==
Liu competed in the women's tournament at the 2020 Summer Olympics. She also represented China at the 2022 Rugby World Cup Sevens in Cape Town.

Liu featured for China at the 2024 World Rugby Sevens Challenger Series in the second leg and scored a try in her sides Cup final victory against Argentina in Montevideo.

She made the Chinese sevens squad and will be competing at the 2024 Summer Olympics in Paris.
