= Yu Okudaira =

Japanese rugby sevens player

- Born: 26 May 1999 (age 27)
- Height: 188 cm (6 ft 2 in)
- Weight: 95 kg (209 lb; 14 st 13 lb)

Rugby union career
- Position(s): Fullback, Wing, Centre
Senior career
Years	Team	Apps	(Points)
2022–2025	Mitsubishi DynaBoars	0	(0)
National sevens team
Years	Team		Comps
2018–2024	Japan		18

Yu Okudaira (born 26 May 1999) is a Japanese rugby sevens player. He competed for Japan at the 2024 Summer Olympics in Paris.
