= Wu Juan =

Chinese rugby sevens player

Personal information
- Nationality: Chinese
- Born: 1 January 1999 (age 27)

Sport
- Sport: Rugby sevens
Medal record
Women's rugby sevens
Representing China
Asian Games
| Gold medal – first place | 2022 Hangzhou | Team |

Wu Juan (born 1 January 1999) is a Chinese rugby sevens player. She competed in the women's tournament at the 2020 Summer Olympics.
