= Yang Feifei =

Chinese rugby sevens player

- Born: 5 October 1997 (age 29) Jinan, China
- Height: 163 cm (5 ft 4 in)
- Weight: 60 kg (132 lb; 9 st 6 lb)

Rugby union career
National sevens team
Years	Team	Comps
2018–Present	China	
Medal record
Women's rugby sevens
Representing China
Asian Games
Gold medal – first place	2022 Hangzhou	Team

Yang Feifei (born 5 October 1997) is a Chinese rugby sevens player.

== Rugby career ==
Yang played for the Chinese women's sevens team at the 2018 Rugby World Cup Sevens in San Francisco. She competed in the women's tournament at the 2020 Summer Olympics.

Yang made her second Olympics after being named in the Chinese sevens squad for the Paris event.
