= Yu Liping =

Chinese rugby union player

- Born: December 22, 1993 (age 32)
- Height: 1.68 m (5 ft 6 in)
- Weight: 66 kg (146 lb)

Rugby union career
National sevens team
Years	Team	Comps
	China	37

Yu Liping (born 22 December 1993) is a Chinese rugby union player. She was selected for the China squad at for the 2020 Summer Games women's rugby sevens tournament.
