= Hangzhou Normal University =

Public university in China

- 杭州师范大学
- Type: Public
- Established: 1908; 118 years ago
- President: Dr. Gaoxiang Ye (叶高翔)
- Location: Hangzhou, People's Republic of China
- Website: www.hznu.edu.cn

Hangzhou Normal University
- Simplified Chinese: 杭州师范大学
- Traditional Chinese: 杭州師範大學
Transcriptions
Standard Mandarin
- Hanyu Pinyin: Hángzhōu Shīfàn Dàxué

Hangzhou Normal University (HZNU simplified Chinese: 杭州师范大学; traditional Chinese: 杭州師範大學; pinyin: Hángzhōu Shīfàn Dàxué), or Hangzhou Teachers College, is a public university in Hangzhou, Zhejiang, China.

Having merged with Hangzhou Education College and Hangzhou Medical Junior College, HZNU comprises nine campuses with a combined area of 513,590 m^{2}.

HZNU has close to 12,000 full-time students, 9,000 of whom are undergraduates. Of over 1,000 teachers, over 100 have a doctorate or are Ph.D. candidates, and 283 have a master's degree. There are nearly 490 professors (researchers) and associate professors (associate researchers).

== History ==
In 1905, the governor of Zhejiang Province founded a teaching school aimed at training teachers for high schools and primary schools in the province. In 1908, the school was named Zhejiang Official Secondary Normal School (浙江官立两级师范学堂) and was in the original address of Zhejiang Gongyuan (浙江贡院). Shen Junru was appointed as a supervisor in 1909.

In 1912, under the guidance of the Education Department of the Republic of China, the school became one of the six well-known higher education schools for teaching at that time. It issued its publications, such as Baiyang (白阳) and Zhejiang Trendy (浙江新潮). It set up clubs, such as Music Rock Club (乐石社), Lakeside Poetry Club (湖畔诗社), and Mingyuan Club (明远学社). Educationist Jing Hengyi (经亨颐) was the principal; famous masters such as Li Shutong and Lu Xun taught there; Feng Zikai, Qian Xuesen, and Pan Tianshou studied at the school.

When the Japanese invaded Hangzhou during World War II, the school was relocated to places such as Jiande and Lishui; it was moved back to Hangzhou after the war.

The school has been under direct jurisdiction of the Hangzhou Municipal Government since 1954. In 1978, the State Council approved to found of Hangzhou Normal College (杭州师范学院), which was approved by the Ministry of Education (China) to change its name to Hangzhou Normal University in March 2007.

In 2010, a proposal was jointly submitted by Sun Zhonghuan, Zhao Guangyu, Yu Jialing, Zhu Zude, and Chen Xiaoping, three municipal officials of Hangzhou. They suggested changing Hangzhou Normal University to Hangzhou University because this university had reached the level of the old University of Hangzhou. However, many provincial and municipal officials and dignitaries rejected it. This was a widespread but unsuccessful proposal in the end.

== General information ==
Xiasha Campus

Hangzhou Normal University has five campuses — Xiasha Campus (下沙校区), Wenyilu Campus (文一校区), Yuhuangshan Campus (玉皇山校区), Gudangwan Campus (古荡湾校区), and Xianghu Campus (湘湖校区) — covering a total area of around 93 hectares (230 acres). Having acquired land of about 37 hectares (91 acres), the university is building another called Cangqian Campus (仓前校区).

Consisting of 18 schools providing 49 undergraduate majors and 39 postgraduate disciplines, the university has three majors with features at the state level; 11 key majors and six key disciplines at the provincial level; one course at the state level; and 18 courses at the provincial level.

The school accommodates 18,597 undergraduates and 1,341 postgraduates and employs over 2,100 staff and faculty members. Among 1,388 full-time teaching faculty, 700 are either professors or associate professors. In addition, four notable co-engaged academicians are tasked to make valuable contributions to the cause of education.

In 2009, a joint venture was made between Hangzhou Normal University and Alibaba group to form Alibaba Business School. Jack Ma, who is the founder and executive chairman of Alibaba Group, is the chairman of Alibaba Business School. Alibaba Business School has stated its determination to change traditional business education by establishing an entrepreneurial college for internet entrepreneurs. Alibaba Business School offers full-time bachelor's and master's degree programs in China, which include E-commerce, International Business, Marketing (Digital Marketing), and Logistics. It has its ASEAN office in Singapore, conducting an E-commerce certification program to enable working adults to be qualified to develop SMEs' E-commerce businesses as well as play an E-commerce specialist role in MNCs.

Working with Nanyang International Business College in Singapore, Alibaba Business School launched the "ASEAN E-Commerce Executive Training Program", a series of training courses in ASEAN countries. Since the program started in May 2016, it has successfully cultivated many internet-thinking talents in Singapore and Malaysia, leading enterprises.

A key laboratory co-built with the Education Department of Zhejiang Province, a group of provincial-level centers for teaching and demonstration centers, the National 863 Plan, scientific and technological programs of the 10th Five-Year Plan National Funds of Natural Sciences and National Funds of Social Sciences, etc. The University publishes some periodicals, such as Hangzhou Normal University Journal, Hangzhou Normal University News, and Yuwen Xinpu. Hangzhou Normal University Journal was selected as an "Excellent Magazine" in East China and has successfully been listed in the "National 100 Top Journals of Liberal Arts and Social Sciences" for three years.

To facilitate intercultural learning experiences, the university has established academic cooperation programs with more than 30 universities around the globe, including the United States, the United Kingdom, Finland, South Korea, Japan, Australia, and the Philippines.

The university's eight-character school motto is "Diligence, Caution, Honesty, Forgiveness, Erudition, Refinement, Perfection, and Initiative".

== Notable alumni ==
Notable alumni have included:

- Jack Ma: CEO of Taobao and Alibaba Group
- Mao Buyi: Chinese singer and songwriter
- Lu Wei (吕薇): national first-class singer; has had numerous performances in Japan, America, Australia, New Zealand, France, etc.
- Xiaopeng Yan (严晓鹏): dean, International Cooperation College, Wenzhou University
- Dr. Yeping Li (李业平): professor and department head, College of Teaching, Learning, and Culture, Texas A&M University
- Fuqiang Jin (金富强): president, Allsino Chemicals Co., Ltd.
- Dr. Jinfa Cai (蔡金法): professor, Department of Mathematical Sciences, University of Delaware
- Feifang Hu (胡飞芳): professor, Department of Statistics, University of Virginia
- Dr. Xueqiang Ma (马学强): researcher fellow, Institute of History of Shanghai Academy of Social Sciences
- Yinyue Hu (胡银岳): head, the Institute of Musicology of The Central Conservatory of Music
- Xiong Ying (应雄): president, Zhejiang Wanli Education Group
- Shengyuan Xu (徐胜元): professor, School of Electrical Engineering and Automation, Nanjing University of Science and Technology
- Shumeng Huang (黄书孟): national second-class professor; former vice president of Zhejiang University
- JieNan Yu (俞杰南): Hangzhou Fuyang district first people's hospital
