= Xu Xiaoyan (rugby union) =

Chinese rugby sevens player

Personal information
- Nationality: Chinese
- Born: 29 January 1998 (age 28)
- Height: 168 cm (5 ft 6 in)
- Weight: 68 kg (150 lb; 10 st 10 lb)

Sport
- Sport: Rugby sevens
Medal record
Women's rugby sevens
Representing China
Asian Games
Gold medal – first place	2022 Hangzhou	Team

Xu Xiaoyan (born 29 January 1998) is a Chinese rugby sevens player. She competed in the women's tournament at the 2020 Summer Olympics. She also represented China at the 2022 Rugby World Cup Sevens in Cape Town.
