= Max Denmark =

Hong Kong rugby union player

- Born: Max Cameron Denmark; 11 August 1999 (age 27) Hong Kong
- Height: 190 cm (6 ft 3 in)
- Weight: 103 kg (227 lb)
- School: Island School / Millfield School

Rugby union career
- Position: Wing
- Current team: Hong Kong Football Club
International career
Years	Team	Apps	(Points)
2017–	Hong Kong	8	
National sevens team
Years	Team		Comps
- Hong Kong 7s
Medal record
Men's rugby sevens
Representing Hong Kong
Asian Games
Gold medal – first place	2018 Jakarta	Team competition
Gold medal – first place	2022 Hangzhou	Team competition
Gold medal – first place	2026 Aichi–Nagoya	Team competition

Max Cameron Denmark MH (born 11 August 1999) is a Hong Kong rugby union player.

Denmark was educated at Island School in Hong Kong and Millfield School in England.

Denmark plays for the Hong Kong national rugby sevens team and Hong Kong rugby union team. He captained the Hong Kong U19 Team to victory at the Asian Rugby U19 Championships in 2018. He competed for Hong Kong at the 2022 Rugby World Cup Sevens in Cape Town.

Denmark became the 297th player for Hong Kong when he made his debut for the Hong Kong rugby union team on 18 November 2017, in an 40–30 win over Kenya at Hong Kong Football Club.

== International Statistics ==
As of 6 November 2022, or after the 2022 Hong Kong Sevens.

Team	Caps	Tries	Points
Hong Kong (7s)	28	16	80
Hong Kong (15s)	8	2	10
Total	36	18	90
