= Yan Meiling =

Chinese rugby sevens player

- Born: 14 January 1997 (age 29)
- Height: 1.66 m (5 ft 5 in)
- Weight: 70 kg (154 lb; 11 st 0 lb)

Rugby union career
National sevens team
Years	Team	Comps
2017–Present	China	
Medal record
Women's rugby sevens
Representing China
Asian Games
Gold medal – first place	2022 Hangzhou	Team
Silver medal – second place	2018 Jakarta–Palembang	Team

Yan Meiling (born 14 January 1997) is a Chinese rugby sevens player.

== Rugby career ==
Yan competed in the women's tournament at the 2020 Summer Olympics. She represented China at the 2022 Rugby World Cup Sevens in Cape Town.

In 2024, she competed for China in the World Rugby Sevens Challenger Series; her side won the first round of the series which took place in Dubai. She featured in the second leg of the Series and scored a try in China's win against Argentina in Montevideo.

She led the Chinese sevens team at the 2024 Summer Olympics in Paris.
