= Gu Yaoyao =

Chinese rugby sevens player

- Born: 22 November 1995 (age 30)
- Height: 168 cm (5 ft 6 in)
- Weight: 67 kg (148 lb; 10 st 8 lb)

Rugby union career
National sevens team
Years	Team	Comps
2018–Present	China	
Medal record
Women's rugby sevens
Representing China
Asian Games
Gold medal – first place	2022 Hangzhou	Team

Gu Yaoyao (born 22 November 1995) is a Chinese rugby sevens player.

== Rugby career ==
Gu competed for China in the women's tournament at the 2020 Summer Olympics. She also represented China at the 2022 Rugby World Cup Sevens in Cape Town.

On June 2, 2024, She suffered a jaw fracture during the Challenger Series and underwent surgery in Spain on June 5; she had her stitches removed on June 14.

Gu was part of the team that qualified for their second Olympics when they won the final qualifying spot in Monaco. She was eventually named in the Chinese squad for the 2024 Summer Olympics in Paris.
