= Cado Lee =

Hong Kong rugby player

Cado Lee Ka To MH
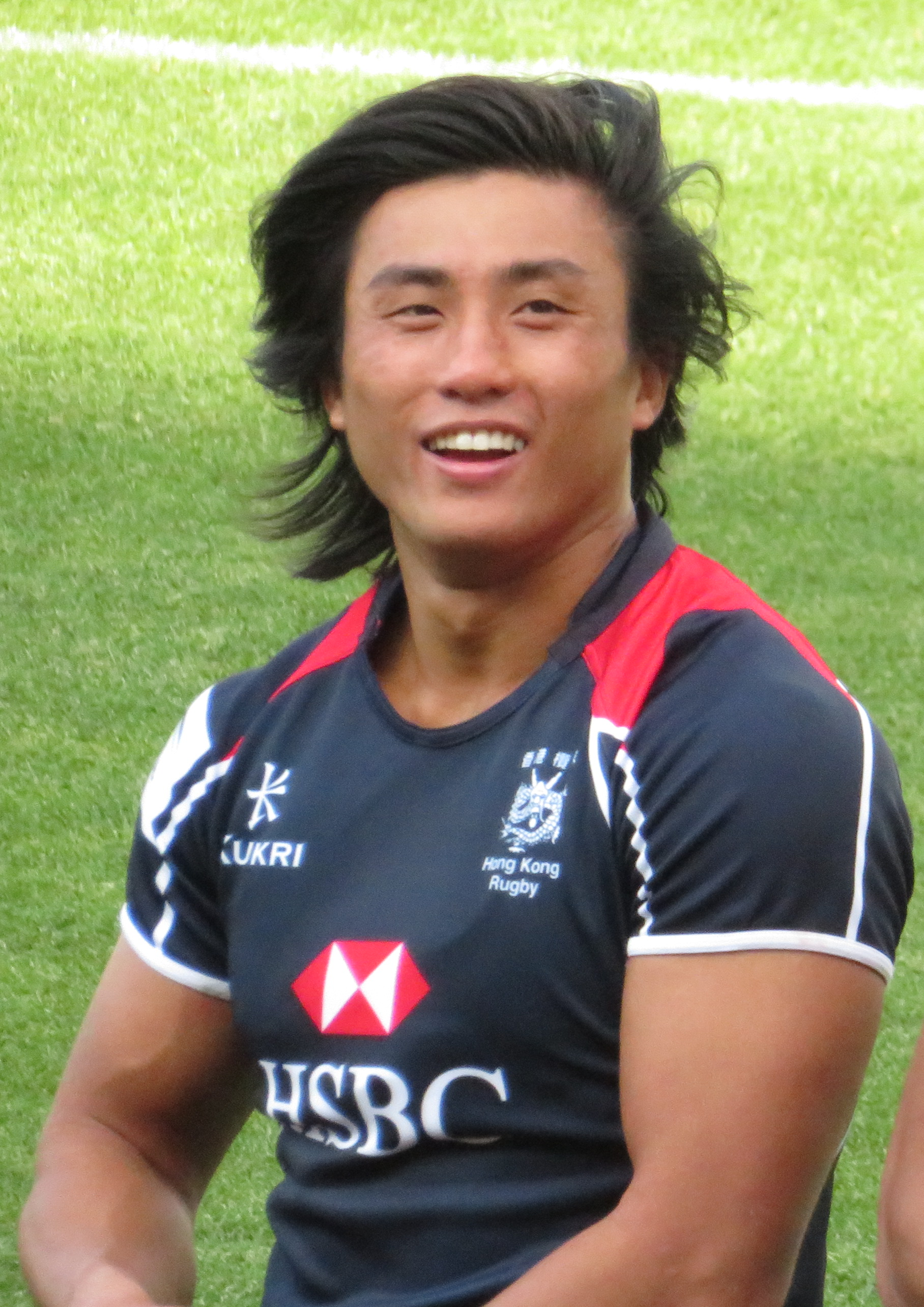
- Born: 27 December 1991 (age 34) British Hong Kong
- Height: 1.70 m (5 ft 7 in)
- Weight: 77 kg (170 lb)
- University: University of Hong Kong

Rugby union career
- Position: Scrum-half
- Current team: USRC Tigers
Senior career
Years	Team	Apps	(Points)
2009–2013	Kowloon		
2012–2013	USRC Tigers		
2017–2018	NEC Green Rockets	10	(0)
2018–present	USRC Tigers		
- Correct as of 3 October 2018
International career
Years	Team	Apps	(Points)
2011–present	Hong Kong (sevens)	9	(15)
2011–present	Hong Kong	24	(0)
- Correct as of 19 May 2024
Medal record
Men's rugby sevens
Representing Hong Kong
Asian Games
Gold medal – first place	2018 Jakarta	Team competition
Gold medal – first place	2022 Hangzhou	Team competition
Gold medal – first place	2026 Aichi–Nagoya	Team competition
Silver medal – second place	2014 Incheon	Team competition

Cado Lee Ka To MH (Chinese: 李卡度; born 27 December 1991) is a Hong Kong rugby union and rugby sevens player. He plays for USRC Tigers RFC, the Hong Kong national sevens team and the Hong Kong national rugby union team.

== Biography ==
=== 2009–2017 ===
Lee started playing rugby when he attended high school in England, and became involved with the Hong Kong Under-20 team on his return to his country of birth. He was a member of the Hong Kong Sevens team at the 2011 Asian Sevens Series. He won a silver medal at the 2014 Asian Games, losing to Japan in the final. He made his international 15's debut on 10 December 2011, in a 72-14 win over the United Arab Emirates in Dubai. He joined the Hong Kong Sports Institute on a part-time basis in December 2013 when rugby sevens became the first team sport admitted to the institute.

=== Move to Japan ===
In August 2017 Lee became the first Chinese player to be recruited by a Top League club, the NEC Green Rockets in Japan. He signed a one-year deal with the Abiko-based club, and made ten appearances during the 2017–18 Top League season. Despite NEC offering him a one-year contract extension, he returned to Hong Kong in early 2018 to prepare for the Hong Kong Sevens which served as qualification of World Rugby Sevens Series, Rugby World Cup Sevens and Asian Games.

=== Hong Kong 2018 ===
In the 2018 Hong Kong Sevens, Hong Kong was eliminated by Chile in the quarter finals, failing to gain promotion to the following year's World Series. In the 2018 Rugby World Cup Sevens, Hong Kong again lost to Chile again to finish as runners-up in the Bowl Final. In the 2018 Asian Games, he helped Hong Kong to win all their games in both the group and knockout stages, including a 14–0 victory against Japan to become one of the first gold medal winners for Hong Kong in rugby sevens.

=== 2022 ===
Lee competed for Hong Kong at the 2022 Rugby World Cup Sevens in Cape Town.
