= Hu Yu =

Chinese rugby sevens player

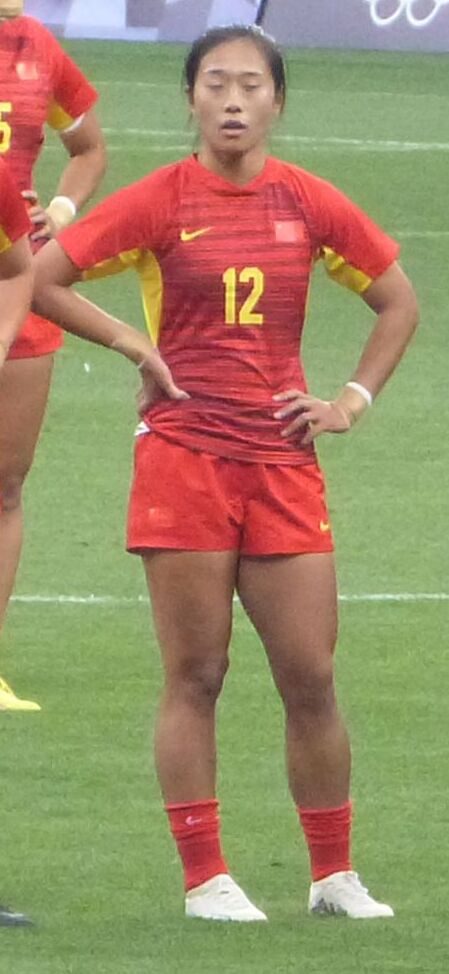
- Born: 9 April 1999 (age 27)
- Height: 165 cm (5 ft 5 in)
- Weight: 65 kg (143 lb; 10 st 3 lb)

Rugby union career
National sevens team
| Years | Team | Comps |
| 2017– | China 7s | |
Medal record
Women's rugby sevens
Representing China
Asian Games
| Gold medal – first place | 2022 Hangzhou | Team |
| Silver medal – second place | 2018 Jakarta–Palembang | Team |

Hu Yu (Chinese: 胡宇, born 9 April 1999) is a Chinese rugby sevens player.

== Rugby career ==
Hu competed for China at the 2018 Rugby World Cup Sevens in San Francisco in July, she then won a silver medal at the 2018 Asian Games almost a month later.

She won a gold medal at the 2022 Asian Games; the 2022 Games in Hangzhou was actually delayed and held in 2023.

Hu will be competing for the Chinese women's sevens team at the 2024 Summer Olympics in Paris.
