= Ma Xiaodan =

Chinese rugby sevens player (born 1998)

- Born: 20 May 1998 (age 28)
- Height: 175 cm (5 ft 9 in)
- Weight: 70 kg (154 lb; 11 st 0 lb)

Rugby union career
National sevens team
| Years | Team | Comps |
- China

Ma Xiaodan (Chinese: 马晓丹, born 20 May 1998) is a Chinese rugby sevens player. She competed for the Chinese women's sevens team at the 2024 Summer Olympics in Paris. She was originally listed as a traveling reserve but played in the quarterfinal match against New Zealand.
