= Hong Kong China Rugby Union =

Governing body for rugby union in Hong Kong

中國香港欖球總會
- Sport: Rugby union
- Founded: 1952; 74 years ago
- World Rugby affiliation: 1988
- Asia Rugby affiliation: 1987
- President: Patrick Donovan
- Men's coach: Lewis Evans
- Women's coach: Jo Hull
- Website: www.hkrugby.com

Hong Kong China Rugby Union (Chinese: 中國香港欖球總會; abbrev. HKCR) is the governing body for rugby union in Hong Kong. It was founded in 1952 and became affiliated to World Rugby (then known as the International Rugby Board) in 1988. It organises and oversees local rugby, including the annual Hong Kong Sevens tournament and the HKRU Premierships.

The organisation was formerly named Hong Kong Rugby Union (HKRU) before 2023.

== History ==
Old HKRU logo

Rugby in Hong Kong started in 1886 with the Hong Kong Football Club being established and often playing matches against local British military personnel based in British Hong Kong. Following the Second World War, the Hong Kong Rugby Union was established in 1952 in order to send a touring team to Japan with funding from the British Army. The HKRU mostly managed matches between British forces. In 1975, the Royal Hong Kong Police Force started fielding teams along with two civilian clubs being established which led to the HKRU setting up leagues. In 1992, they also established a women's league.

In 1997, prior to the handover of Hong Kong to China, there was concerns that the HKRU may not survive. This was due to rugby in Hong Kong mostly being played by expatriates, they would no longer have British workers coming freely nor would British military teams tour regularly. This was exacerbated by Hong Kong national rugby union team players being deported following the handover for not having work visas. However, due to local Hong Kongers starting to play the sport, the HKRU survived and by 2017, had an even 50-50 split of locals and expatriates playing rugby in Hong Kong.

In 2023, the Hong Kong Olympic Committee demanded that all sports associations affiliated to it include "China" within their names or risk expulsion and loss of funding. The HKRU acquiesced to this demand and became "Hong Kong China Rugby Union". However, it is still popularly referred to as HKRU.

=== Anthem controversies ===
In November 2022, Glory to Hong Kong was played after a match between the teams from South Korea and Hong Kong. The HKRU said "The HKRU expressed its extreme dissatisfaction at this occurrence and has received a full explanation of the circumstances that led to this. Whilst we accept this was a case of human error it was nevertheless not acceptable." Media reported that the local organiser had earlier asked each team for a copy of their anthems to play at the competition, but the Hong Kong team did not submit one.

Later in November 2022, the head of HKRU, Robbie McRobbie, said new rules that dictate athletes should correct organisers if the national anthem is played incorrectly were reasonable and practical.

== See also ==
- Hong Kong national rugby union team
- Rugby union in Hong Kong
