= Natasha Olson-Thorne =

HK international rugby union player

- Born: October 6, 1992 (age 34)
- Height: 1.63 m (5 ft 4 in)
- Weight: 62 kg (137 lb)

Rugby union career
- Position: Inside Centre
International career
Years	Team	Apps	(Points)
2010–	Hong Kong		
National sevens team
Years	Team		Comps
2011–	Hong Kong		
Medal record
Women's rugby sevens
Representing Hong Kong
Asian Games
Bronze medal – third place	2022 Hangzhou	Team

Natasha Shangwe Olson-Thorne (born 6 October 1992) is a Hong Kong rugby union player. She represented Hong Kong at the 2017 Women's Rugby World Cup in Ireland, it was their first World Cup appearance. She scored Hong Kong's first World Cup try in their match against Wales.

== Personal life ==
Olson-Thorne began playing rugby at the age of 15 while attending Sha Tin College. In 2015 she graduated from the University of Hong Kong with a Bachelor of Science in Exercise and Health.

== Rugby career ==
=== Sevens ===
Olson-Thorne made her international sevens debut at the 2011 Hong Kong Women's Sevens. She captained the side for the first time at the 2016 Hong Kong Women's Sevens, it was her sixth appearance at the tournament.

Olson-Thorne was also in the sevens team vying for a spot at the 2016 Summer Olympics via a repechage tournament in Dublin. She was in the 2021 sevens squad that 'narrowly' missed their chance to qualify for the delayed 2020 Tokyo Olympics.

She co-captained the Hong Kong sevens team at the 2021 Asia Women's Sevens Series, it was a qualifier event for the 2022 Rugby World Cup Sevens. However, they lost to Japan in the semifinal and missed their chance.

=== XVs ===
Olson-Thorne made her international debut for the Hong Kong women's national rugby union team in 2010. At the 2017 Women's Rugby World Cup in Ireland, she created history when she scored Hong Kong's first World Cup try in their match against Wales.

In 2022, she was named in the squad that played in a two-test series against Kazakhstan in December 2022. In 2024, she started in the opening match of the Asia Championship against Japan.
