= Yoshiyuki Koga =

Japanese rugby sevens player

- Born: 28 August 1998 (age 28)
- Height: 175 cm (5 ft 9 in)
- Weight: 83 kg (183 lb; 13 st 1 lb)

Rugby union career
- Position: Wing
- Current team: Ricoh Black Rams
Senior career
Years	Team	Apps	(Points)
2021–	Ricoh Black Rams	3	(5)
National sevens team
Years	Team		Comps
2021–Present	Japan		20

Yoshiyuki Koga (born 28 August 1998) is a Japanese rugby sevens player. He competed for Japan at the 2024 Summer Olympics in Paris.
