= Wakaba Hara =

Japanese rugby sevens player (born 2000)

Wakaba Okuno
- Born: Wakaba Hara; 6 January 2000 (age 26) Niigata, Japan
- Height: 160 cm (5 ft 3 in)
- Weight: 60 kg (132 lb; 9 st 6 lb)
- Notable relative: Shota Okuno (spouse)

Rugby union career
National sevens team
Years	Team	Comps
2017–Present	Japan	
Medal record
Women's rugby sevens
Representing Japan
Asian Games
Silver medal – second place	2022 Hangzhou	Team

Wakaba Okuno (奥野 わか花, Okuno Wakaba), née Wakaba Hara (原 わか花, Hara Wakaba; born 6 January 2000), is a Japanese rugby sevens player.

== Personal life ==
In 2022, she graduated with a degree in General Policy Studies from the Policy Faculty at Keio University.

In 2024, she married Shota Okuno, a rugby player for Secom Rugguts.

== Rugby career ==
Hara debuted for Japan at the 2017 Asia Rugby Women's Sevens Series in Incheon, South Korea.

She competed in the women's tournament at the 2020 Summer Olympics. She made the Sakura Sevens squad and competed at the 2022 Rugby World Cup Sevens in Cape Town.

She competed at the 2024 Summer Olympics in Paris.
