= Junya Matsumoto =

Japanese rugby union player

- Born: 17 March 2000 (age 26)
- Height: 171 cm (5 ft 7 in)
- Weight: 80 kg (176 lb; 12 st 8 lb)

Rugby union career
- Position: Wing
- Current team: Urayasu D-Rocks
Senior career
Years	Team	Apps	(Points)
2022-	Urayasu D-Rocks	4	(0)
National sevens team
Years	Team		Comps
	Japan 7s		17

Junya Matsumoto (松本純弥, Junya Matsumoto; born 17 March 2000) is a Japanese rugby sevens player. He competed for Japan at the 2024 Summer Olympics in Paris.
