= Yukino Tsujisaki =

Japanese rugby sevens player

- Born: 21 June 1994 (age 32)
- Height: 161 cm (5 ft 3 in)
- Weight: 61 kg (134 lb; 9 st 8 lb)

Rugby union career
National sevens team
Years	Team	Comps
- Japan

Yukino Tsujisaki (born 21 June 1994) is a Japanese rugby sevens player. She was originally listed as a traveling reserve for Japan but competed at the 2024 Summer Olympics in Paris.
