= Sun Yue (rugby union) =

Chinese rugby sevens player

- Born: 31 December 1999 (age 26)
- Height: 170 cm (5 ft 7 in)
- Weight: 68 kg (150 lb; 10 st 10 lb)

Rugby union career
National sevens team
Years	Team	Comps
2022–	China	

Sun Yue (born 31 December 1999) is a Chinese rugby sevens player.

== Rugby career ==
Sun represented China at the 2022 Rugby World Cup Sevens in Cape Town.

She will be competing for the Chinese women's sevens team at the 2024 Summer Olympics in Paris.
