= Dou Xinrong =

Chinese rugby sevens player

- Born: 27 May 2001 (age 25)
- Height: 170 cm (5 ft 7 in)
- Weight: 62 kg (137 lb; 9 st 11 lb)

Rugby union career
National sevens team
Years	Team	Comps
2023–Present	China	
Medal record
Women's rugby sevens
Representing China
Asian Games
Gold medal – first place	2022 Hangzhou	Team

Dou Xinrong (born 27 May 2001) is a Chinese rugby sevens player.

== Rugby career ==
Dou won a gold medal at the delayed 2022 Asian Games which was held in Hangzhou in 2023. She will be competing for the Chinese women's sevens team at the 2024 Summer Olympics in Paris.
