= Singapore Rugby Union =

Governing body for rugby union in Singapore

- Sport: Rugby union
- Founded: 1948 (as a Malayan State Union), 1966 (Post Independence)
- World Rugby affiliation: 1989
- Asia Rugby affiliation: 1968
- President: Sunny Seah

The Singapore Rugby Union is the governing body for rugby union in Singapore. It was founded in 1948. The current president is Sunny Seah, a civil servant who played rugby at St Andrews School, Anglo Chinese Junior College and the Guards formation.

The Singapore Rugby Union is currently located at 1 Choa Chu Kang Street 53, Unit 02-10, Choa Chu Kang Swimming Complex, Singapore 689236. Its main playing ground is the Jurong West Active SG Stadium.

== Presidents ==
Tenure	President
1972 - 1975	Niaz Mohamed Shah
1976	Gurcharan Singh
1977 - 1984	Howard Cashin
1985 - 2005	Chan Peng Mun
2006 - 2017	Low Teo Ping
2017 - 2023	Terrence Khoo
2023 - present	Sunny Seah

== Coaches ==
In 2019, Simon Mannix took over as national head coach from Mark Lee on a three-year contract. In 2021, Mannix left the position to return to France.

Suhaimi Amran, a former Singapore National Player, was appointed as the National team's head coach in 2022, overseeing all national teams.

== Stadium ==
The Jurong West Active SG Stadium is the on field home of Singapore Rugby and is where all major games are being played.

== Incidents ==
In October 2005, it was reported that Sean Lee, a former financial executive of the Singapore Rugby Union, absconded with SGD$300,000. On the last day of his work when he resigned, the money was found missing from the Union's accounts. In April 2007, the absconded amount was revealed to be three times more than what was originally reported in November 2005. A total of SGD$1.215 million was misappropriated over an 18-month period by writing Union checks with forged signatures to companies registered under his name.

In March 2009, nearly half of the national team went on strike citing nationality bias by the management, as well as not addressing some issues and concerns with training. Ex-captain and incumbent backrower Rong Jing Xiang was also part of the players who went on strike. After the Rugby Union met with the players to resolve the issue, the Singapore Rugby Union agreed to address some their concerns and also to implement a "balance" in the ratio of local to expatriate players in the team. In final team selections, Rong was subsequently dropped from the team.

== See also ==
- Singapore national rugby union team
- Rugby union in Singapore
