= Jessica Ho (rugby union) =

Hong Kong rugby union player (born 1992)

- Born: 12 May 1992 (age 34)

Rugby union career
International career
Years	Team	Apps	(Points)
2016–Present	Hong Kong		
Medal record
Women's rugby sevens
Representing Hong Kong
Asian Games
Bronze medal – third place	2022 Hangzhou	Team

Jessica Ho Wai-on (born 12 May 1992) is a Hong Kong rugby union player. She competed for Hong Kong in their first World Cup appearance in 2017.

== Biography ==
Ho graduated from the University of Exeter in 2014, she studied Sports Science. She made her debut for Hong Kong against Fiji in 2016. In 2018 she was selected for Hong Kong's end-of-year tour of Spain and Wales. Ho toured the Netherlands in 2019 and helped Hong Kong win their first test series in Europe.

In 2019 she featured for the Hong Kong sevens team at the Asia Sevens Qualifiers and at the Repechage tournament in Monaco. She was named in the squad that played in a two-test series against Kazakhstan in December 2022.
