= Wang Wanyu =

Chinese rugby sevens player

- Born: 14 February 1997 (age 29) Xuzhou, China
- Height: 170 cm (5 ft 7 in)
- Weight: 60 kg (132 lb; 9 st 6 lb)

Rugby union career
National sevens team
Years	Team	Comps
2017–Present	China	
Medal record
Women's rugby sevens
Representing China
Asian Games
Gold medal – first place	2022 Hangzhou	Team
Silver medal – second place	2018 Jakarta–Palembang	Team

Wang Wanyu (Chinese: 王婉钰; pinyin: Wáng Wǎnyù; born 14 February 1997) is a Chinese rugby sevens player.

== Rugby career ==
Wang competed in the women's tournament at the 2020 Summer Olympics. She was named in the Chinese squad and made her second Olympic appearance at the 2024 Paris Olympics.
