= Chen Keyi =

Chinese rugby sevens player (born 1995)

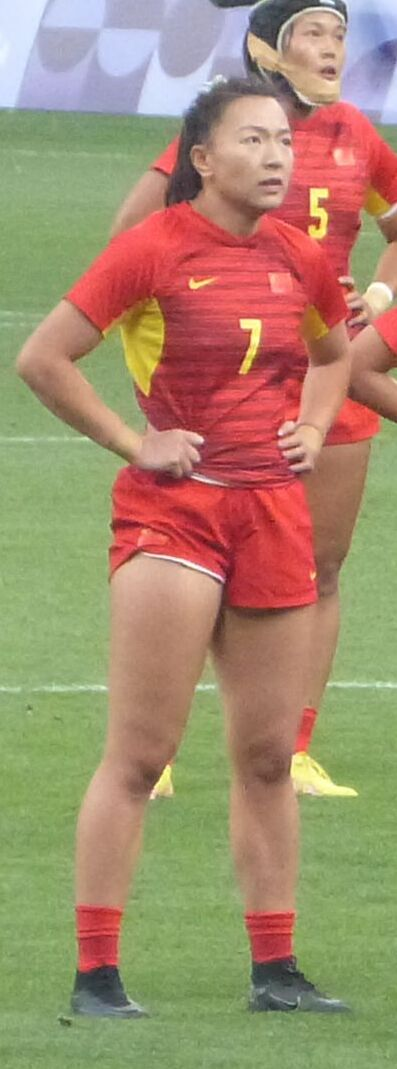
- Born: 23 July 1995 (age 31) Sichuan, China
- Height: 171 cm (5 ft 7 in)
- Weight: 69 kg (152 lb; 10 st 12 lb)

Rugby union career
National sevens team
Years	Team	Comps
2012–Present	China	
Medal record
Women's rugby sevens
Representing China
Asian Games
Gold medal – first place	2014 Incheon	Team
Gold medal – first place	2022 Hangzhou	Team
Silver medal – second place	2018 Jakarta–Palembang	Team

Chen Keyi (born 23 July 1995) is a Chinese rugby sevens player.

== Rugby career ==
Chen competed in the women's tournament at the 2020 Summer Olympics. She represented China at the 2022 Rugby World Cup Sevens in Cape Town.

In 2024, she competed for China in the World Rugby Sevens Challenger Series; her side won the first round of the series which took place in Dubai. She also featured in the second leg of the Series and scored a try in China's Cup final win against Argentina in Montevideo.

Chen was named in the Chinese squad and will make her second Olympic appearance at the 2024 Summer Olympics in Paris.
