= Marin Kajiki =

Japanese rugby sevens player

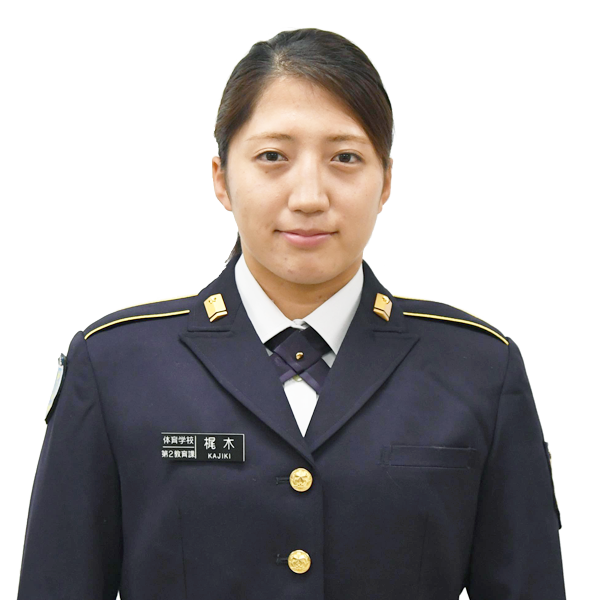
- Born: 20 September 1999 (age 27) Fukuoka, Japan
- Height: 164 cm (5 ft 5 in)
- Weight: 68 kg (150 lb; 10 st 10 lb)

Rugby union career
National sevens team
Years	Team	Comps
- Japan
Medal record
Women's rugby sevens
Representing Japan
Asian Games
Silver medal – second place	2022 Hangzhou	Team

Marin Kajiki (梶木真凜, born 20 September 1999) is a Japanese rugby sevens player. She represented Japan in sevens at the 2020 and 2024 Summer Olympics.

== Rugby career ==
Kajiki competed in the women's tournament at the delayed 2020 Summer Olympics. She made the Sakura Sevens squad and competed at the 2022 Rugby World Cup Sevens in Cape Town.

She also played for Japan at the 2024 Summer Olympics in Paris.

In May 2025, she was named in the SVNS Dream Team for the 2024–25 series.
