= Chong Ka-yan =

Hong Kong rugby union and sevens player

- Born: 24 November 1993 (age 32)
- Height: 1.57 m (5 ft 2 in)
- Weight: 50 kg (110 lb)

Rugby union career
- Position: Wing
International career
| Years | Team | Apps | (Points) |
- Hong Kong
National sevens team
| Years | Team | | Comps |
| 2015– | Hong Kong | | |
Medal record
Women's rugby sevens
Representing Hong Kong
Asian Games
| Bronze medal – third place | 2022 Hangzhou | Team |

Chong Ka-yan (born 24 November 1993) is a Hong Kong rugby union and sevens player. She competed for Hong Kong at the 2017 Women's Rugby World Cup in Ireland.

== Rugby career ==
=== Sevens career ===
Chong made her sevens debut for Hong Kong at the Qingdao leg of the 2015 Asia Rugby Women's Sevens Series. She competed in the 2019 Hong Kong Sevens which was a qualifier for the 2019–20 Sevens Series, she scored a try in her sides loss to Papua New Guinea.

In 2021, she was part of the Hong Kong sevens side that competed at the repechage tournament in Monaco.

She featured for Hong Kong in the Montevideo leg of the 2024 Sevens Challenger Series; she scored a hat-trick in her sides seventh place win over Kenya. She was then named in the squad for the 2024 Hong Kong Sevens to compete in the Melrose Claymore challenge. She helped her side beat China in the first match when she crossed the try-line.

=== XVs career ===
Chong was named in Hong Kong's XVs team to the 2017 Women's Rugby World Cup in Ireland where they made their debut.

At the 2023 Asia Championship she scored a try in Hong Kong's narrow defeat to Kazakhstan in Almaty. In 2024, she started in the opening match of the Asia Championship against Japan. She scored in the 78th minute despite her side going down 12–29.

She featured for Hong Kong at the 2025 Asia Rugby Women's Championship, she scored the sides only try against Japan in the tournament's final match.
