= Josua Kerevi =

Fiji born-Japanese rugby sevens player

- Born: 18 June 1992 (age 34)
- Height: 190 cm (6 ft 3 in)
- Weight: 98 kg (216 lb; 15 st 6 lb)

Rugby union career
- Position(s): Fullback, Wing, Centre
- Current team: Toyota Shuttles
Senior career
Years	Team	Apps	(Points)
2017–2020	Akita Northern Bullets	23	(96)
2020–	Toyota Shuttles	54	(103)
National sevens team
Years	Team		Comps
	Japan		13

Josua Kerevi (born 18 June 1992) is a Fiji born-Japanese rugby sevens player. He competed for Japan at the 2024 Summer Olympics in Paris.
