= Hana Nagata =

Japanese rugby sevens player

- Born: 19 May 2000 (age 26) Fukuoka, Japan
- Height: 166 cm (5 ft 5 in)
- Weight: 60 kg (132 lb; 9 st 6 lb)

Rugby union career
National sevens team
| Years | Team | Comps |
- Japan 7s

Hana Nagata (永田花菜, born 19 May 2000) is a Japanese rugby sevens player. She competed in the women's tournament at the 2020 Summer Olympics. She was named in the Sakura Sevens squad to compete at the 2022 Rugby World Cup Sevens in Cape Town.
