= Honoka Tsutsumi =

Japanese rugby sevens player

- Born: 19 June 1997 (age 29) Ureshino, Japan
- Height: 154 cm (5 ft 1 in)
- Weight: 56 kg (123 lb; 8 st 11 lb)

Rugby union career
International career
Years	Team	Apps	(Points)
- Japan
National sevens team
Years	Team		Comps
2016–Present	Japan		
Medal record
Women's rugby sevens
Representing Japan
Asian Games
Silver medal – second place	2022 Hangzhou	Team

Honoka Tsutsumi (堤ほの花, born 19 June 1997) is a Japanese rugby union and sevens player. She represented Japan at the 2020 and 2024 Summer Olympics. She also competed at the 2017 Women's Rugby World Cup.

== Rugby career ==
In 2016, Tsutsumi scored a try in the Sakura fifteens 55–0 thrashing of Fiji as her side qualified for the World Cup in Ireland.

Tsutsumi featured for the Sakura fifteens team at the 2017 Women's Rugby World Cup in Ireland. Following the World Cup, she appeared for the Sakura sevens side in the Asian Women's Sevens Series in their bid to qualify for the 2018 Rugby World Cup Sevens.

In 2018, she ran in three tries on day one of the Korean round of the Asian Sevens Series as her side defeated hosts, South Korea, 48–0.

During the Chinese leg of the 2019 Asian Women's Sevens Series, she scored a sudden death try in extra time to help her team beat China and win the second round of the series.

She competed in the women's tournament at the 2020 Summer Olympics. She also competed at the 2024 Summer Olympics in Paris.
