= Yume Hirano =

Japanese rugby sevens player

- Born: 15 March 2000 (age 26) Tokyo, Japan
- Height: 160 cm (5 ft 3 in)
- Weight: 60 kg (132 lb; 9 st 6 lb)

Rugby union career
National sevens team
Years	Team	Comps
2016–Present	Japan	
Medal record
Women's rugby sevens
Representing Japan
Asian Games
Gold medal – first place	2018 Jakarta–Palembang	Team
Silver medal – second place	2022 Hangzhou	Team

Yume Hirano (平野優芽; born 15 March 2000) is a Japanese rugby sevens player.

Hirano competed in the women's tournament at the 2020 Summer Olympics. She captained Japan at the 2022 Rugby World Cup Sevens in Cape Town.

She led Japan at the 2024 Summer Olympics in Paris.
