= Chiaki Saegusa =

Japanese rugby sevens player

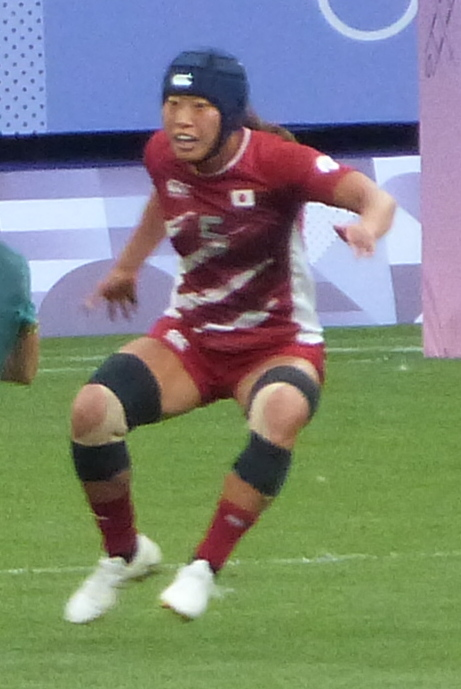
- Born: 21 March 1997 (age 29)
- Height: 167 cm (5 ft 6 in)
- Weight: 68 kg (150 lb; 10 st 10 lb)

Rugby union career
National sevens team
Years	Team	Comps
2021–Present	Japan	

Chiaki Saegusa (born 21 March 1997) is a Japanese rugby sevens player.

== Rugby career ==
Saegusa made her international sevens debut for Japan at the 2021 Asia Rugby Women's Sevens Series in Dubai.

In 2023, She won a silver medal at the delayed 2022 Asian Games in Hangzhou, China. She competed for Japan at the 2024 Summer Olympics in Paris.
