= Mei Ohtani =

Japanese rugby sevens player

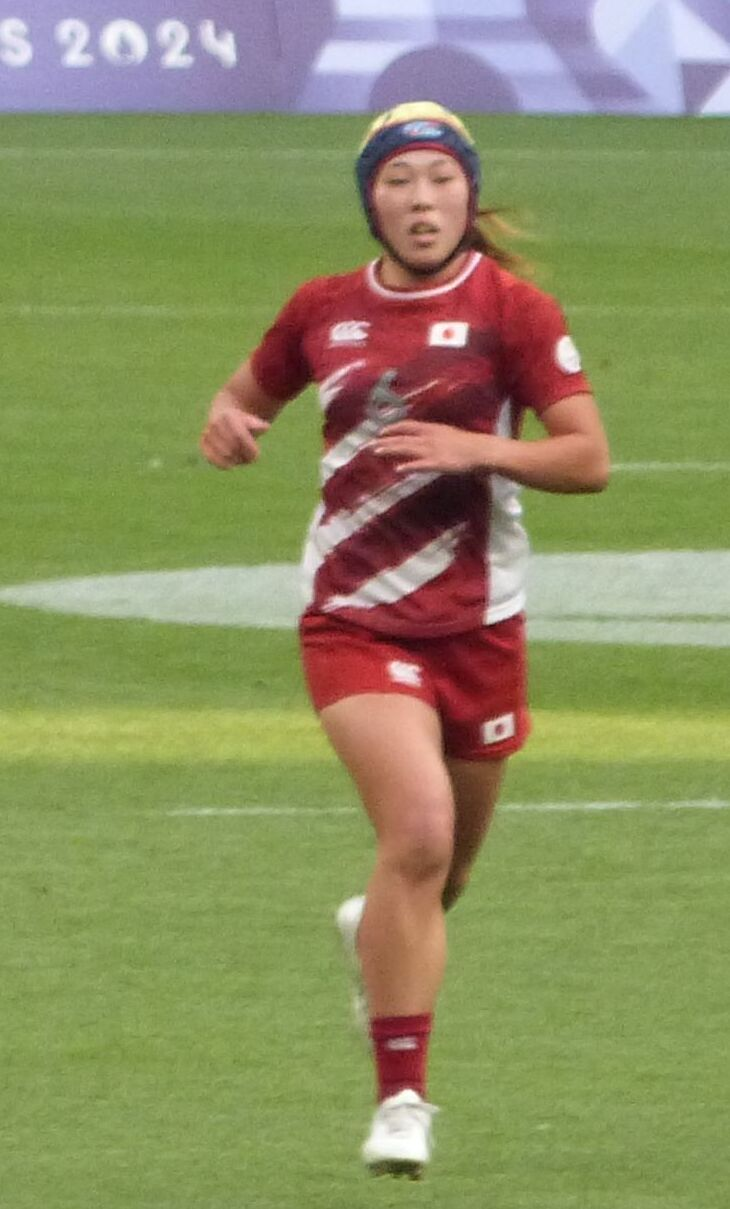
- Ohtani during the 2024 Olympics match against South Africa
- Born: 28 May 2000 (age 26) Kyoto, Japan
- Height: 162 cm (5 ft 4 in)
- Weight: 61 kg (134 lb; 9 st 8 lb)

Rugby union career
National sevens team
Years	Team	Comps
2021–Present	Japan	

Mei Ohtani (大谷芽生, Ōtani Mei, born 28 May 2000) is a Japanese rugby sevens player.

== Rugby career ==
Ohtani competed in the 2020 Summer Olympics. She was named in the Sakura Sevens squad to compete at the 2022 Rugby World Cup Sevens in Cape Town.

She competed for Japan at the 2024 Summer Olympics in Paris.
