= 2022–23 World Rugby Women's Sevens Series squads =

International rugby sevens

Sevens 2022–23 squads

This is a list of the complete squads for the 2022–23 World Rugby Women's Sevens Series.

Legend
Gold	Indicates the captains for a tournament
–	Indicates that a player did not play in the tournament

== Australia ==
Head Coach: (Australia) Tim Walsh

Australia team members 2022–23
Player	Jersey number by tournament						
Player	Dubai	Cape Town	Hamilton	Sydney	Vancouver	Hong Kong	Toulouse
Madison Ashby	6	6	6	6	6	6	6
Charlotte Caslick	7	7	7	7	7	7	7
Lily Dick	1	–	1	1	1	–	1
Dominique du Toit	4	4	4	4	4	4	4
Demi Hayes	11	11	11	11	–	–	–
Tia Hinds	9	–	9	9	9	9	9
Alysia Lefau-Fakaosilea	55	55	55	55	55	55	55
Maddison Levi	12	12	12	12	12	12	12
Teagan Levi	5	5	5	5	5	5	5
Faith Nathan	3	3	3	3	3	3	3
Sariah Paki	65	65	65	65	65	65	65
Bienne Terita	22	22	22	22	22	22	22
Sharni Williams	2	2	2	2	–	–	2
Faythe Manera	–	13	–	–	–	13	–
Isabella Nasser	–	10	–	–	10	10	–

== Brazil ==
Head Coach: (Brazil) William Broderick

Brazil team members 2022–23
Player	Jersey number by tournament						
Player	Dubai	Cape Town	Hamilton	Sydney	Vancouver	Hong Kong	Toulouse
Andressa Alves	10	10	10	10	10	10	10
Camilla Carvalho	9	9	9	9	9	–	9
Marina Fioravanti	8	8	8	8	8	8	8
Thalia Costa	5	5	5	5	5	5	–
Thalita Costa	13	13	13	13	13	–	13
Luiza Campos	2	2	2	2	2	2	2
Gisele Gomes	7	7	7	7	7	7	–
Isadora Lopes	6	6	6	6	6	6	6
Bianca Silva	11	11	–	–	–	–	–
Leila Silva	4	4	4	4	–	4	4
Mariana Silva	13	13	13	13	13	–	13
Marcelle Souza	12	12	12	12	–	–	–
Rafaela Zanellato	3	3	3	3	3	3	3
Gabriela Lima	–	–	14	14	14	14	14
Mariana Nicolau	–	–	–	–	1	1	1
Aline Ribeiro	–	–	–	–	15	15	–
Milena Mariano	–	–	–	–	–	16	16
Yasmim Soares	–	–	–	–	–	–	17

== Canada ==
Head Coach: (Republic of Ireland) Jack Hanratty

Canada team members 2022–23
Player	Jersey number by tournament						
Player	Dubai	Cape Town	Hamilton	Sydney	Vancouver	Hong Kong	Toulouse
Olivia Apps	21	21	21	21	21	21	21
Fancy Bermudez	10	10	10	10	10	–	10
Olivia De Couvreur	1	1	1	1	1	1	1
Bianca Farella	8	8	8	8	8	–	–
Renee Gonzalez	3	3	3	3	–	–	–
Julia Greenshields	5	5	–	–	–	5	5
Nakisa Levale	19	19	19	19	–	–	–
Breanne Nicholas	4	4	–	4	4	4	4
Krissy Scurfield	2	2	2	2	2	2	–
Florence Symonds	7	7	–	–	7	–	–
Shalaya Valenzuela	23	23	23	23	–	23	23
Keyara Wardley	12	12	–	–	12	12	–
Charity Williams	6	6	6	–	–	–	–
Pamphinette Buisa	–	–	99	99	–	–	–
Alysha Corrigan	–	–	16	16	16	16	16
Chloe Daniels	–	–	77	77	77	77	–
Madison Grant	–	–	33	33	–	33	33
Piper Logan	–	–	–	–	11	11	11
Taejah Thompson	–	–	–	–	13	13	–
Sophie de Goede	–	–	–	–	–	–	15
Eden Kilgour	–	–	–	–	–	–	14
Sabrina Poulin	–	–	–	–	–	–	22

== Fiji ==
Head Coach: (Fiji) Saiasi Fuli

Fiji team members 2022–23
Player	Jersey number by tournament						
Player	Dubai	Cape Town	Hamilton	Sydney	Vancouver	Hong Kong	Toulouse
Younis Bese	11	11	11	11	–	11	11
Lavena Cavuru	7	7	7	7	7	7	–
Raijieli Daveua	5	5	5	5	–	5	5
Ilisapeci Delaiwau	9	9	9	9	9	9	9
Verenaisi Ditavutu	13	13	–	–	–	–	–
Sesenieli Donu	4	4	–	–	–	–	–
Iva Nabura	2	2	2	2	2	2	–
Ana Maria Naimasi	8	8	8	8	8	8	8
Alowesi Nakoci	12	12	–	–	–	–	–
Viniana Riwai	10	10	10	10	10	10	–
Reapi Ulunisau	6	6	6	6	6	6	6
Adi Vani Buleki	3	3	3	3	3	3	3
Talei Wilson	1	1	1	1	1	1	1
Rusila Nagasau	–	–	14	14	14	14	14
Maria Solikoviti	–	–	16	16	16	–	16
Vasiti Turagavou	–	–	15	15	15	–	–
Meredani Qoro	–	–	–	–	17	17	17
Meredani Naidau	–	–	–	–	–	–	18
Elenoa Adi Naimata	–	–	–	–	–	–	19

== France ==
Head Coach: (France) David Courteix

France team members 2022–23
Player	Jersey number by tournament						
Player	Dubai	Cape Town	Hamilton	Sydney	Vancouver	Hong Kong	Toulouse
Alycia Chrystiaens	22	22	22	22	–	–	–
Mathilde Coutouly	77	77	–	–	–	–	–
Lili Dezou	28	28	28	28	28	28	28
Margaux Duces	99	–	–	–	–	–	–
Lilou Graciet	14	14	14	–	–	–	–
Camille Grassineau	8	8	8	8	8	–	–
Lucy Hapulat	29	29	29	–	–	29	–
Ian Jason	88	88	88	88	88	88	88
Valentine Lothoz	7	7	7	7	–	7	7
Carla Neisen	9	9	9	9	9	9	9
Lou Noel	4	4	4	4	4	4	4
Chloé Pelle	3	3	3	3	3	3	3
Yolaine Yengo	6	6	6	6	6	–	6
Mae Levy	–	92	–	–	–	–	–
Joanna Grisez	–	–	5	5	5	–	5
Séraphine Okemba	–	–	1	1	1	1	1
Montserrat Amedee	–	–	–	67	–	67	67
Hada Traore	–	–	–	30	–	–	–
Caroline Drouin	–	–	–	–	10	10	10
Chloé Jacquet	–	–	–	–	15	15	15
Jade Ulutule	–	–	–	–	13	–	–
Paula Barrat	–	–	–	–	–	25	–

== Great Britain ==
Head Coach: (Wales) Nicholas Wakley

Great Britain team members 2022–23
Player	Jersey number by tournament						
Player	Dubai	Cape Town	Hamilton	Sydney	Vancouver	Hong Kong	Toulouse
Ellie Boatman	13	13	–	–	13	13	13
Abbie Brown	2	2	–	–	2	2	2
Shona Campbell	5	–	5	5	5	5	5
Heather Cowell	23	23	23	23	23	23	23
Megan Jones	10	10	10	10	10	10	10
Jasmine Joyce	11	–	–	11	11	11	11
Alicia Maude	95	95	95	95	95	95	–
Isla Norman-Bell	9	9	9	–	9	9	9
Kayleigh Powell	18	18	18	18	–	–	–
Celia Quansah	8	8	–	–	–	–	–
Jade Shekells	22	22	22	22	22	22	22
Emma Uren	7	7	7	7	7	7	–
Amy Wilson-Hardy	12	12	12	12	12	12	12
Lauren Torley	–	6	6	6	–	–	–
Lisa Thomson	–	1	1	1	1	1	1
Grace Crompton	–	–	4	4	–	–	4
Georgie Lingham	–	–	27	27	–	–	–
Rhona Lloyd	–	–	–	–	16	16	16

== Ireland ==
Head Coach: (England) Aiden McNulty

Ireland team members 2022–23
Player	Jersey number by tournament						
Player	Dubai	Cape Town	Hamilton	Sydney	Vancouver	Hong Kong	Toulouse
Kathy Baker	6	6	6	6	6	6	6
Natasja Behan	14	–	14	14	–	–	–
Claire Boles	1	1	1	1	1	1	1
Megan Burns	8	8	8	8	8	8	8
Vicki Elmes Kinlan	21	21	21	21	21	21	–
Kate Farrell McCabe	11	11	11	11	11	11	11
Eve Higgins	10	10	10	10	10	10	10
Erin King	13	13	13	–	13	13	13
Emily Lane	12	–	12	12	12	12	12
Anna McGann	19	–	19	19	–	–	19
Lucy Mulhall	9	9	9	9	9	9	9
Amee-Leigh Murphy Crowe	5	5	5	5	5	5	5
Beibhinn Parsons	7	7	7	7	7	7	7
Stacey Flood	–	3	–	3	3	3	3
Katie Heffernan	–	2	–	–	2	2	2
Brittany Hogan	–	4	–	–	–	–	–

== Japan ==
Head Coach: (Japan) Takashi Suzuki

Japan team members 2022–23
Player	Jersey number by tournament						
Player	Dubai	Cape Town	Hamilton	Sydney	Vancouver	Hong Kong	Toulouse
Atecayumi Bativakalolo	8	8	–	–	–	–	–
Wakaba Hara	11	11	11	11	11	11	11
Yume Hirano	7	7	7	7	7	7	7
Marin Kajiki	2	2	2	2	2	2	2
Tomomi Kozasa	3	3	3	3	3	–	–
Sakura Mizutani	4	4	4	4	4	4	4
Hana Nagata	10	10	10	10	10	10	10
Chiharu Nakamura	1	1	1	1	1	–	1
Mei Ohtani	6	6	6	6	6	6	6
Chiaki Saegusa	5	5	5	5	5	5	5
Michiyo Suda	12	12	12	12	12	12	12
Hanako Utsumi	9	9	9	–	–	–	–
Sayo Yasui	13	13	13	13	–	–	–
Yukino Tsujisaki	–	–	15	15	15	15	15
Mayu Yoshino	–	–	–	14	14	14	–
Mio Yamanaka	–	–	–	–	16	16	16
Iroha Nagata	–	–	–	–	–	17	–
Fumiko Otake	–	–	–	–	–	–	19

== New Zealand ==
Head Coach: (New Zealand) Cory Sweeney

New Zealand team members 2022–23
Player	Jersey number by tournament						
Player	Dubai	Cape Town	Hamilton	Sydney	Vancouver	Hong Kong	Toulouse
Michaela Blyde	6	6	6	6	6	6	–
Kelly Brazier	8	8	–	–	8	8	8
Jazmin Felix-Hotham	13	13	13	13	13	13	13
Tysha Ikenasio	26	26	–	26	26	–	–
Shiray Kaka	22	22	22	22	22	22	22
Jorja Miller	83	83	83	83	83	83	84
Tyla Nathan-Wong	7	7	7	7	7	7	7
Manaia Nuku	33	33	–	–	–	33	–
Mahina Paul	81	–	–	–	–	–	81
Risi Pouri-Lane	77	77	77	77	77	77	77
Terina Te Tamaki	14	14	–	–	–	–	–
Kelsey Teneti	18	18	–	–	18	–	–
Niall Williams	4	4	4	4	–	–	4
Tenika Willison	–	99	99	99	–	–	–
Theresa Fitzpatrick	–	–	10	10	10	–	–
Stacey Fluhler	–	–	3	3	3	3	3
Sarah Hirini	–	–	34	34	34	34	34
Alena Saili	–	–	12	–	–	12	12
Portia Woodman-Wickliffe	–	–	11	11	11	11	11

== Spain ==
Head Coach: (Spain) Pedro de Matías

Spain team members 2022–23
Player	Jersey number by tournament						
Player	Dubai	Cape Town	Hamilton	Sydney	Vancouver	Hong Kong	Toulouse
Eva Aguirre	1	1	1	1	1	1	1
Ingrid Algar	9	9	9	9	9	9	9
Amalia Argudo	5	5	5	5	–	–	–
Maria Calvo	12	–	12	12	12	12	12
Marta Cantabrana Gil	14	14	14	14	14	14	14
Bruna Elias	13	13	13	13	13	13	–
Amaia Erbina	3	3	3	3	–	–	–
Olivia Fresnada	8	8	8	8	8	8	8
Maria Garcia	6	6	6	6	6	6	–
Claudia Peña	21	21	21	21	–	–	21
Iciar Pozo Eizaguirre	4	4	4	–	–	–	–
Paula Requena	7	7	7	7	7	7	7
Elisabet Segara Cararach	15	15	–	–	15	–	–
Claudia Perez Perez	–	25	–	–	–	–	–
Beatriz Dominguez Sanchez	–	–	2	2	2	2	2
Raquel Garcia	–	–	–	–	20	20	–
Tecla Masoko Bueriberi	–	–	–	–	23	23	–
Silvia Morales	–	–	–	–	–	18	18
Alba Capell	–	–	–	–	–	–	29
Anne Fernández de Corres	–	–	–	–	–	–	10
Cristina López	–	–	–	–	–	–	26

== United States ==
Head Coach: (United States) Emilie Bydwell

United States team members 2022–23
Player	Jersey number by tournament						
Player	Dubai	Cape Town	Hamilton	Sydney	Vancouver	Hong Kong	Toulouse
Kayla Canett	3	3	3	3	3	3	3
Cheta Emba	1	1	1	1	1	1	1
Joanne Fa'avesi	9	9	9	9	–	–	–
Jazmine Gray	99	99	99	–	–	–	–
Nicole Heavirland	4	4	4	4	4	4	–
Kristi Kirshe	12	12	12	12	12	12	12
Ilona Maher	2	2	2	2	2	–	–
Alena Olsen	6	6	6	6	6	6	6
Stephanie Rovetti	10	10	–	–	–	10	10
Alex Sedrick	5	5	5	5	–	5	5
Samantha Sullivan	22	22	22	22	22	–	22
Naya Tapper	7	7	7	7	7	7	7
Kristen Thomas	11	11	11	11	11	11	11
Lauren Doyle	–	–	23	23	23	23	23
Sarah Levy	–	–	–	13	–	–	–
Alev Kelter	–	–	–	–	15	15	15
Ariana Ramsey	–	–	–	–	21	21	–
Summer Harris-Jones	–	–	—	–	–	–	27

== Non-core teams ==
One place in each tournament of the series is allocated to a national team based on performance in the respective continental tournaments within Africa, Asia, Europe, Oceania, and the Americas.

== China ==
Head Coach: (Fiji) Osea Kolinisau

China team members 2022–23
Player	Jersey number by tournament
Player	Dubai
Zhuang ChengCheng	3
Ruan Hong Ting	1
Chen Keyi	7
Yan Meiling	2
Zheng Wenyan	11
Wang Xiao	4
Ma Xiaodan	5
Xu Xiaoyan	13
Zhou Yan	9
Gu Yaoyao	10
Zhao Ying	12
Hu Yu	6
Jiang Yutong	8

== Colombia ==
Head Coach: (Colombia) Lissete Martínez

Colombia team members 2022–23
Player	Jersey number by tournament
Player	Vancouver
Valentina Álvarez	5
Ángela Alzate	3
Daniela Alzate	4
María Aruaga	7
Karina Bagui	6
Maria Castrillón	1
Leidy García	11
Sofía Granados	8
Camila Lopera	9
Yuriza Martínez	2
Laura Mejía	10
Valentina Tapias	12

== Hong Kong ==
Head Coach: (Wales) John Paul

Hong Kong team members 2022–23
Player	Jersey number by tournament
Player	Hong Kong
Sin Yi Au Yeung	3
Micayla Baltazar	16
Chloe Chan	5
Stephanie Chan	11
Jessie Wai On Ho	8
Tsz Yan Lam	4
Melody Li	9
Mba Oyana Julia Mibuy	7
Ka Man Nam	10
Natasha Olson-Throne	2
Wing Kiu Tse	12
Rosanna Wright	6

== Papua New Guinea ==
Head Coach: (Papua New Guinea) Billy Rapilla

Papua New Guinea team members 2022–23
Player	Jersey number by tournament	
Player	Hamilton	Sydney
Helen Abau	11	11
Alice Alois	3	3
Lynette Aua	2	2
Marie Biyama	13	13
Joanne Butler	12	–
Tengapai Gigimat	6	6
Doreen Kaputin	14	14
Naomi Kelly	7	7
Gewen Pokana	4	4
Cathy Puro	8	8
Fatima Rama	10	10
Kymlie Rapila	9	9
Barbara Sigere	1	1
Darlene Aihi	–	15

== Poland ==
Head Coach: (Poland) Janusz Urbanowicz

Poland team members 2022–23
Player	Jersey number by tournament
Player	Toulouse
Tamara Czumer-Iwin	3
Julia Druzgała	10
Małgorzata Kołdej	4
Hanna Maliszewska	9
Marta Morus	5
Natalia Pamięta	11
Katarzyna Paszczyk	6
Klaudia Respondek	15
Julianna Schuster	2
Sylwia Witkowska	12
Ilona Zaisliuc	13
Patrycja Zawadzka	1

== South Africa ==
Head Coach: (South Africa) Renfred Dazel

South Africa team members 2022–23
Player	Jersey number by tournament
Player	Cape Town
Kemiketso Baloyi	3
Jacomina Cilliers	4
Marlize de Bruin	5
Lusanda Dumke	13
Veroeshka Grain	10
Aseza Hele	8
Felicia Jacobs	6
Liske Lategan	12
Anacadia Minnaar	7
Rights Mkhari	1
Simamkele Namba	11
Asispho Plaaitjies	2
Nadine Roos	9
