= Rugby sevens at the 2024 Summer Olympics – Women's team squads =

This article shows the squads of all participating teams for the women's rugby sevens competition at the 2024 Summer Olympics. Each squad was allowed up to 12 players, as well as two traveling reserves in case of injury.

== Group A ==
=== New Zealand ===
New Zealand's squad of 12 players was named on 20 June 2024. Additionally, Tysha Ikenasio, Tenika Willison and Kelsey Teneti were named as traveling reserves.

Head coach: Cory Sweeney

- Michaela Blyde
- Jazmin Felix-Hotham
- Sarah Hirini (c)
- Tyla King
- Jorja Miller
- Manaia Nuku
- Mahina Paul
- Risaleeana Pouri-Lane
- Alena Saili
- Theresa Setefano
- Stacey Waaka
- Portia Woodman-Wickliffe

=== Fiji ===
Fiji's squad of 13 players was finalized on 18 July 2024. Additionally Rogosau Adimereani was named as a traveling reserve.

Head coach: Saiasi Fuli

- Verenaisi Ditavutu
- Kolora Lomani
- Sesenieli Donu
- Alowesi Nakoci
- Ana Maria Naimasi
- Adi Vani Buleki
- Ilisapeci Delaiwau
- Reapi Ulunisau
- Lavena Cavuru
- Raijieli Daveua
- Maria Rokutuisiga
- Laisana Likuceva
- Talei Wilson

=== Canada ===
Canada's squad of 12 players was named on 10 July 2024. Additionally, Taylor Perry was named as a traveling reserve. Head coach: Jack Hanratty

- Caroline Crossley
- Olivia Apps (c)
- Alysha Corrigan
- Asia Hogan-Rochester
- Chloe Daniels
- Charity Williams
- Florence Symonds
- Carissa Norsten
- Krissy Scurfield
- Fancy Bermudez
- Piper Logan
- Keyara Wardley

=== China ===
China's squad of 12 players was finalized on 18 July 2024. Additionally, Wang Xiao and Ma Xiaodan were named as traveling reserves.

Head coach: Lu Zhuan

- Gu Yaoyao
- Sun Yue
- Chen Keyi
- Liu Xiaoqian
- Wang Wanyu
- Su Qi
- Hu Yu
- Yan Meiling (c)
- Ruan Hongting
- Yang Feifei
- Zhou Yan
- Dou Xinrong

== Group B ==
=== Australia ===
Australia's squad of 12 players was named on 2 July 2024. Additionally, Kahli Henwood and Sidney Taylor were named as traveling reserves.

Head coach: Tim Walsh

- Bienne Terita
- Sharni Smale
- Faith Nathan
- Dominique Du Toit
- Teagan Levi
- Sariah Paki
- Charlotte Caslick (c)
- Kaitlin Shave
- Tia Hinds
- Isabella Nasser
- Maddison Levi
- Bridget Clark

=== Ireland ===
Ireland's squad of 12 players was named on 17 June 2024. Additionally, Claire Boles and Amy Larn were named as traveling reserves.

Head coach: Allan Temple-Jones

- Kathy Baker
- Megan Burns
- Amee-Leigh Murphy Crowe
- Alanna Fitzpatrick
- Stacey Flood
- Eve Higgins
- Erin King
- Vicky Elmes Kinlan
- Emily Lane
- Ashleigh Orchard
- Béibhinn Parsons
- Lucy Rock (c)

=== Great Britain ===
Great Britain's squad of 12 players was named on 19 June 2024. Additionally, Abi Burton and Kayleigh Powell were named as traveling reserves.

Head coach: Nick Wakley

- Amy Wilson-Hardy
- Ellie Boatman
- Ellie Kildunne
- Emma Uren (c)
- Grace Crompton
- Heather Cowell
- Isla Norman-Bell
- Jade Shekells
- Jasmine Joyce
- Lauren Torley
- Lisa Thomson
- Megan Jones

=== South Africa ===
South Africa's squad of 12 players was named on 29 June 2024. Additionally, Shiniqwa Lamprecht and Shona-Leah Weston were named as traveling reserves.

Head coach: Renfred Dazel

- Mathrin Simmers (cc)
- Zintle Mpupha (cc)
- Sizophila Solontsi
- Veroeshka Grain
- Kemisetso Baloyi
- Nadine Roos
- Liske Lategan
- Byrhandré Dolf
- Ayanda Malinga
- Libbie Janse van Rensburg
- Marlize de Bruin
- Maria Tshiremba

== Group C ==
=== France ===
France's squad of 12 players was named on 8 July 2024. Additionally, Alycia Chrystiaens and Shannon Izar were named as traveling reserves.

Head coach: David Courteix

- Anne-Cécile Ciofani
- Lili Dezou
- Caroline Drouin
- Camille Grassineau
- Joanna Grisez
- Chloé Jacquet
- Iän Jason
- Carla Neisen (c)
- Lou Noel
- Séraphine Okemba
- Chloé Pelle
- Yolaine Yengo

=== United States ===
USA's squad of 12 players was named on 17 June 2024. Additionally, Nicole Heavirland and Kristen Thomas were named as traveling reserves.

Head coach: Emilie Bydwell

- Alena Olsen
- Alev Kelter
- Ariana Ramsey
- Ilona Maher
- Kayla Canett
- Kristi Kirshe
- Lauren Doyle (c)
- Naya Tapper (c)
- Sammy Sullivan
- Sarah Levy
- Spiff Sedrick
- Stephanie Rovetti

=== Japan ===
Japan's squad of 12 players was named on 4 July 2024.

Head coach: Takashi Suzuki

- Hanako Utsumi
- Mei Ohtani
- Marin Kajiki
- Chiaki Saegusa
- Emii Tanaka
- Honoka Tsutsumi
- Chiharu Nakamura
- Arisa Nishi
- Wakaba Hara
- Yume Hirano (c)
- Rinka Matsuda
- Sakura Mizutani

=== Brazil ===
Brazil's squad of 12 players was named on 3 July 2024. Additionally, Leila Cássia Silva and Aline Furtado were named as traveling reserves.

Head coach: Will Broderick

- Mariana Nicolau
- Luiza Campos (c)
- Milena Mariano
- Gisele Gomes
- Thalia Costa
- Thalita Costa
- Yasmim Soares
- Marina Fioravanti
- Gabriela Lima
- Raquel Kochhann
- Bianca Silva
- Marcelle Souza
