= 2021–22 World Rugby Women's Sevens Series squads =

International rugby sevens

Sevens 2021–22 squads

This is a list of the complete squads for the 2021–22 World Rugby Women's Sevens Series.

Legend
Gold	Indicates the captains for a tournament
–	Indicates that a player did not play in the tournament

== Australia ==
Head coach: (Australia) Tim Walsh

Australia team members 2021–22
Player	Jersey number by tournament					
Player	Dubai I	Dubai II	Málaga	Seville	Langford	Toulouse
Madison Ashby	8	8	8	8	8	8
Rhiannon Byers	5	5	–	5	–	–
Charlotte Caslick	7	7	7	7	7	7
Lily Dick	1	1	1	1	1	1
Dominique du Toit	4	4	4	4	4	4
Demi Hayes	11	11	11	11	11	11
Tia Hinds	9	9	9	9	–	6
Alysia Lefau-Fakaosilea	6	6	6	6	6	–
Maddison Levi	12	12	12	12	12	12
Teagan Levi	13	–	–	13	–	13
Faith Nathan	3	3	3	3	3	3
Sariah Paki	10	10	10	10	10	10
Sharni Williams	2	2	–	2	2	2
Jakiya Whitfield	–	13	13	–	13	–
Cassandra Staples	–	–	2	–	–	–
Bienne Terita	–	–	5	–	9	9
Jesse Southwell	–	–	–	–	5	5

== Brazil ==
Head coach: (England) William Broderick

Brazil team members 2021–22
Player	Jersey number by tournament					
Player	Dubai I	Dubai II	Málaga	Seville	Langford	Toulouse
Andressa Alves	3	3	3	–	–	
Luiza Campos	2	2	2	2	2	2
Isadora Cerullo	6	6	6	6	–	–
Marina Fioravanti Costa	8	8	8	8	8	8
Thalia Costa	5	5	5	5	5	5
Aline Furtado	7	7	7	7	7	7
Raquel Kochhann	10	10	10	10	10	10
Gabriela Lima	9	9	9	9	9	9
Mariana Nicolau	1	–	1	1	1	1
Edna Santini	13	13	13	13	–	–
Bianca Silva	11	11	–	–	11	11
Leila Silva	4	4	4	4	–	–
Marcelle Souza	12	12	–	–	12	12
Claudia Teles	–	1	–	–	6	6
Isadora Lopes de Souza	–	–	12	12	12	12
Eshyllen Coimbra	–	–	11	11	–	–
Camilla Carvalho	–	–	–	–	13	13
Rafaela Zanellato	–	–	–	–	3	3

== Canada ==
Head coach: (Republic of Ireland) Jack Hanratty

Canada team members 2021–22
Player	Jersey number by tournament					
Player	Dubai I	Dubai II	Málaga	Seville	Langford	Toulouse
Elissa Alarie	11	11	–	11	11	–
Olivia Apps	5	5	5	5	2	2
Fancy Bermudez	10	10	10	10	10	10
Pamphinette Buisa	3	3	3	3	3	–
Emma Chown	6	6	6	6	–	6
Chloe Daniels	12	12	12	12	–	–
Olivia De Couvreur	1	1	1	1	1	1
Renee Gonzalez	2	2	–	–	6	3
Asia Hogan-Rochester	9	9	–	–	9	9
Nakisa Levale	8	8	8	8	5	5
Breanne Nicholas	4	4	4	4	4	4
Sabrina Poulin	7	7	7	7	–	–
Krissy Scurfield	13	13	–	–	13	13
Alysha Corrigan	–	–	2	2	–	–
Paige Farries	–	–	9	9	–	–
Karen Paquin	–	–	13	–	–	–
Alex Tessier	–	–	11	13	–	–
Bianca Farella	–	–	–	–	8	8
Florence Symonds	–	–	–	–	7	7
Keyara Wardley	–	–	–	–	12	12
Ella O'Regan	–	–	–	–	–	11

== England ==
Head coach: (England) Charlie Hayter

England team members 2021–22
Player	Jersey number by tournament			
Player	Málaga	Seville	Langford	Toulouse
Ellie Boatman	8	8	8	8
Abbie Brown	2	2	2	2
Abi Burton	3	3	3	3
Heather Cowell	5	5	5	–
Grace Crompton	4	4	4	–
Tatyana Heard	12	12	–	–
Megan Jones	10	10	–	–
Alicia Maude	6	6	6	6
Chantelle Miell	13	13	–	–
Isla Norman-Bell	9	9	9	9
Kelly Smith	11	11	–	–
Georgina Tasker	1	1	–	4
Emma Uren	7	7	7	7
Merryn Doidge	–	–	11	–
Jodie Ounsley	–	–	1	1
Jade Shekells	–	–	13	13
Lauren Torley	–	–	10	10
Amy Wilson-Hardy	–	–	12	12
Maisy Allen	–	–	–	5
Jessica Weaver	–	–	–	11

== Fiji ==
Head coach: (Fiji) Saiasi Fuli

Fiji team members 2021–22
Player	Jersey number by tournament			
Player	Dubai I	Dubai II	Langford	Toulouse
Rogosau Adimereani	10	10	–	–
Lavenia Cavuru	7	7	7	7
Raijieli Daveua	5	5	5	5
Sesenieli Donu	4	4	4	4
Laisana Likuceva	11	11	11	11
Rusila Nagasau	1	1	1	1
Ana Maria Naimasi	8	8	8	8
Alowesi Nakoci	9	9	9	9
Ana Roqica	12	12	–	11
Lavenia Tinai	13	13	–	–
Reapi Ulunisau	6	6	6	6
Vasiti Solikoviti	2	2	2	2
Adi Vani Buleki	3	3	13	13
Verenaisi Ditavutu	–	–	3	3
Viniana Riwai	–	–	10	10
Mereula Torooti	–	–	11	–

== France ==
Head coach: (France) David Courteix

France team members 2021–22
Player	Jersey number by tournament					
Player	Dubai I	Dubai II	Málaga	Seville	Langford	Toulouse
Coralie Bertrand	7	7	7	7	7	–
Anne-Cécile Ciofani	2	2	–	2	–	–
Mathilde Coutouly	6	6	6	6	–	10
Joanna Grisez	12	12	4	4	–	6
Shannon Izar	11	11	–	–	11	–
Ian Jason	8	8	11	11	12	12
Valentine Lothoz	13	13	2	1	–	1
Carla Neisen	9	9	9	–	9	9
Lou Noel	4	4	–	12	2	2
Séraphine Okemba	1	1	1	–	1	–
Chloé Pelle	3	3	3	3	3	3
Jade Ulutule	5	5	13	13	13	13
Yolaine Yengo	10	10	5	5	5	5
Camille Grassineau	–	–	8	8	8	8
Lina Guérin	–	–	12	–	–	–
Nassira Konde	–	–	10	–	4	4
Montserrat Amedee	–	–	–	10	10	–
Chloe Jacquet	–	–	–	9	–	11
Marie Dupouy	–	–	–	–	6	–
Alycia Chrystiaens	–	–	–	–	–	7

== Ireland ==
Head coach: (Republic of Ireland) Aiden McNulty

Ireland team members 2021–22
Player	Jersey number by tournament					
Player	Dubai I	Dubai II	Málaga	Seville	Langford	Toulouse
Kathy Baker	6	6	–	8	–	–
Claire Boles	1	1	6	6	6	6
Megan Burns	8	8	8	–	8	8
Stacey Flood	3	3	3	3	3	3
Katie Heffernan	2	2	2	2	2	2
Eve Higgins	10	10	10	10	10	10
Brittany Hogan	4	4	4	4	4	4
Erin King	13	13	13	13	13	13
Kate Farrell McCabe	11	11	11	11	11	11
Lucy Mulhall	9	9	9	9	9	9
Amee-Leigh Murphy Crowe	5	5	5	5	5	5
Beibhinn Parsons	7	7	7	7	7	–
Aoibheann Reilly	12	12	–	–	–	–
Emily Lane	–	–	12	12	12	12
Anna McGann	–	–	1	1	–	7
Vicki Elmes Kinlan	–	–	–	–	1	1

== New Zealand ==
Head coach: (New Zealand) Cory Sweeney

New Zealand team members 2021–22
Player	Jersey number by tournament	
Player	Langford	Toulouse
Michaela Blyde	6	6
Kelly Brazier	8	8
Theresa Fitzpatrick	10	10
Stacey Fluhler	3	3
Sarah Hirini	5	5
Jazmin Hotham	13	13
Shiray Kaka	1	2
Risi Pouri-Lane	4	1
Tyla Nathan-Wong	7	7
Alena Saili	12	12
Terina Te Tamaki	2	–
Tenika Willison	9	9
Portia Woodman	11	11
Niall Williams	–	4

== Russia ==
Head coach: (Russia) Alexander Alekseenko

Russia team members 2021–22
Player	Jersey number by tournament			
Player	Dubai I	Dubai II	Málaga	Seville
Asiiat Alieva	2	2	2	2
Anna Baranchuk	12	12	12	12
Iana Danilova	6	6	6	–
Viktoriia Em	3	3	3	3
Baizat Khamidova	5	5	5	5
Marina Kukina	8	8	–	–
Snezhanna Kulkova	10	10	9	9
Daria Luahina	9	9	–	–
Daria Noritsina	1	1	1	1
Mariia Pogrebniak	13	13	–	–
Kristina Seredina	7	7	7	7
Nadezhda Sozonova	11	11	–	11
Alena Tiron	4	4	4	4
Diana Glushenko	–	–	8	8
Nadezhda Medvedeva	–	–	13	13
Olga Pestova	–	–	11	–
Elena Zdrokova	–	–	10	10
Daria Shestakova	–	–	–	6

== Spain ==
Head coach: (Spain) Pedro De Matias

Spain team members 2021–22
Player	Jersey number by tournament					
Player	Dubai I	Dubai II	Málaga	Seville	Langford	Toulouse
Ingrid Algar	9	9	9	–	–	9
Amalia Argudo	12	12	12	12	12	12
Maria Calvo	1	1	–	11	9	10
Beatriz Dominguez Sanchez	2	2	2	2	2	2
Lea Ducher	5	5	5	5	5	5
Iera Echebarria	11	11	11	–	11	11
Amaia Erbina	3	3	3	3	3	3
Anne Fernández de Corres	10	10	10	10	–	–
Olivia Fresnada	8	8	8	8	8	8
Maria Gracia	6	6	6	6	6	6
Silvia Morales	13	13	–	–	–	–
Iciar Pozo Eizaguirre	4	4	–	–	4	4
Paula Requena	7	7	7	7	7	7
Eva Aguirre	–	–	1	1	1	1
Bruna Elias	–	–	4	4	10	–
Clara Piquero	–	–	13	13	–	–
Ceci Huarte Sebastián	–	–	–	9	–	–
Marta Cantabrana Gil	–	–	–	–	13	13

== United States ==
Head coach: (Canada) Emilie Bydwell

United States team members 2021–22
Player	Jersey number by tournament					
Player	Dubai I	Dubai II	Málaga	Seville	Langford	Toulouse
Sui A'Au	10	10	–	–	10	10
Cheta Emba	1	–	1	1	1	1
Joanne Fa'avesi	13	13	–	–	9	9
Jazmine Gray	8	8	8	8	8	8
Abby Gustaitis	3	3	–	–	–	–
Summer Harris-Jones	12	12	–	–	–	–
Alev Kelter	5	5	–	–	–	–
Ilona Maher	2	2	2	2	2	2
Alena Olsen	6	6	6	6	6	6
Alex Sedrick	9	9	9	9	7	7
Naya Tapper	7	7	7	7	–	–
Lote Tausinga	4	4	–	–	–	–
Kris Thomas	11	11	11	11	11	11
Rachel Strasdas	–	1	–	–	–	–
Kayla Canett	–	–	3	3	3	3
Lauren Doyle	–	–	5	5	5	5
Nicole Heavirland	–	–	4	4	4	4
Mata Hingano	–	–	10	10	–	–
Kristi Kirshe	–	–	12	12	12	12
Sarah Levy	–	–	13	13	13	13

== Non-core teams ==
Great Britain played in the first two rounds of the series, which both took place in Dubai, because of the existing agreement to compete as Great Britain through the end of 2021, before England resumed competing separately in 2022. Belgium replaced New Zealand at Málaga and Seville, because New Zealand could not travel due to COVID-19. For Dubai I and Dubai II events, no place was allocated to a non-core team. For Málaga and Seville events, one place was allocated to a national team based on performance in the respective continental tournaments within Africa, Asia, Europe, Oceania, and the Americas. For the rest of the tournaments, following the ban of core team Russia, two places in each tournament of the series were allocated to a national team based on performance in the respective continental tournaments within Africa, Asia, Europe, Oceania, and the Americas.

== Belgium ==
Head coach: (France) Romain Huet

Belgium team members 2021–22
Player	Jersey number by tournament	
Player	Málaga	Seville
Ella Amory	8	8
Cécile Blondiau	4	4
Shari Claes	6	6
Pauline Gernaey	11	11
Ciska De Grave	2	2
Loes Hubrecht	10	10
Margaux Lalli	1	1
Emilie Musch	3	3
Manon Nairac	7	7
Cristina Pecoraro	13	–
Nele Pien	12	–
Margaux Pierson	9	9
Margaux Stévins	5	5
Louise Liegeois	–	13
Héloïse Stévins	–	12

== Great Britain ==
Head coach: (Scotland) Scott Forrest

Great Britain team members 2021–22
Player	Jersey number by tournament	
Player	Dubai I	Dubai II
Ellie Boatman	8	
Abbie Brown	2	2
Abi Burton	3	3
Shona Campbell	9	9
Grace Crompton	4	4
Heather Cowell	13	13
Megan Jones	10	10
Jasmine Joyce	11	11
Alicia Maude	6	6
Kelly Smith	5	5
Lisa Thomson	1	1
Emma Uren	7	7
Amy Wilson-Hardy	12	12

== Japan ==
Head coach: (Japan) Takashi Suzuki

Japan team members 2021–22
Player	Jersey number by tournament
Player	Langford
Wakaba Hara	9
Yume Hirano	7
Marin Kajiki	3
Mifuyu Koide	11
Tomomi Kozasa	2
Misaki Matsumura	8
Sakura Mizutani	5
Hana Nagata	10
Chiharu Nakamura	1
Mei Ohtani	6
Chiaki Saegusa	4
Sakurako Yazaki	12
Mayu Yoshino	13

== Mexico ==
Head coach: (Mexico) Alessandro Cordone

Mexico team members 2021–22
Player	Jersey number by tournament
Player	Langford
Daniela Alvarado	5
Alessandra Bender	6
Isabela Berazueta	2
Juanita Elguezabal-Dority	12
Jazmin Hernandez	14
Alma Jimenez	8
Karina Landeros	3
Ariana Lewis	15
Maria Prujin	13
Cecilia Ramirez	10
Laura Rodriguez	7
Jennifer Salomon	1
Zoe Tuyu	10

== Poland ==
Head coach: (Poland) Janusz Urbanowicz

Poland team members 2021–22
Player	Jersey number by tournament	
Player	Málaga	Seville
Julia Druzgała	10	10
Anna Klichowska	7	7
Małgorzata Kołdej	4	4
Aleksandra Lachowska	1	1
Aleksandra Leśniak	13	13
Hanna Maliszewska	9	9
Marta Morus	5	5
Natalia Pamięta	11	11
Oksana Panasenko	15	15
Sylwia Witkowska	12	12
Patrycja Zawadzka	6	6

== Portugal ==
Head coach: (Portugal) João Moura

Portugal team members 2021–22
Player	Jersey number by tournament
Player	Seville
Leonor Amaral	4
Daniela Correia	5
Maria João Costa	3
Yara Fonseca	6
Marta Inácio	1
Inês Marques	8
Mariana Marques	11
Vanessa Nunes	13
Beatriz Oliveira	12
Isabel Ozório	10
Mariana Santos	2
Vera Simões	9
Inês Spínola Duarte	7

== Scotland ==
Head coach: (Scotland) Scott Forrest

Scotland team members 2021–22
Player	Jersey number by tournament
Player	Toulouse
Shona Campbell	5
Abi Evans	2
Megan Gaffney	3
Coreen Grant	11
Rhona Lloyd	7
Caitlin Mattinson	9
Rachel McLachlan	12
Helen Nelson	8
Emma Orr	4
Chloe Rollie	6
Meryl Smith	10
Lisa Thomson	1
Evie Wills	13

== South Africa ==
Head coach: (South Africa) Paul Delport

South Africa team members 2021–22
Player	Jersey number by tournament
Player	Toulouse
Alichia Arries	11
Liske Lategan	12
Lerato Makua	1
Ayanda Malinga	3
Anacadia Minnaar	6
Zintle Mpupha	4
Asispho Plaaitjies	2
Nadine Roos	9
Snenhlanhla Shozi	5
Mathrin Simmers	10
Donelle Snyders	13
Sizo Solontsi	8
Eloise Webb	7
