= 2022 Rugby World Cup Sevens squads – Women =

The rosters of all participating teams at the Women's tournament of the 2022 Rugby World Cup Sevens.

== Australia ==
The following team was announced as the 2022 Rugby World Cup Sevens sevens team.

Head coach: Tim Walsh

No.	Player	Date of birth (age)
1	Lily Dick	26 December 1999 (aged 22)
2	Sharni Williams	2 March 1988 (aged 34)
3	Faith Nathan	27 July 2000 (aged 22)
4	Dominique du Toit	19 May 1997 (aged 25)
5	Teagan Levi	14 August 2003 (aged 19)
6	Alysia Lefau-Fakaosilea	5 November 2000 (aged 21)
7	Charlotte Caslick	9 March 1995 (aged 27)
8	Madison Ashby	22 January 2001 (aged 21)
9	Tia Hinds	11 May 2002 (aged 20)
10	Sariah Paki	12 October 2001 (aged 20)
11	Demi Hayes	25 May 1998 (aged 24)
12	Maddison Levi	27 April 2002 (aged 20)

== Brazil ==
The following team was announced as the 2022 Rugby World Cup Sevens sevens team.

Head coach: William Alexander Broderick

No.	Player	Date of birth (age)
1	Mariana Nicolau	16 November 1997 (aged 24)
2	Luiza Campos	30 July 1990 (aged 32)
3	Larissa Carvalho	31 May 2003 (aged 19)
4	Leila Cássia Silva	23 October 1996 (aged 25)
5	Thalia Costa	30 May 1997 (aged 25)
6	Isadora Lopes de Souza	3 August 1997 (aged 25)
7	Aline Furtado	2 October 1995 (aged 26)
8	Marina Fioravanti	6 October 1993 (aged 28)
9	Gabriela Lima	2 August 1994 (aged 28)
10	Andressa Alves	9 December 2000 (aged 21)
11	Bianca Silva	22 July 1998 (aged 24)
12	Marcelle Souza	22 July 1996 (aged 26)

== Canada ==
The following team was announced as the 2022 Rugby World Cup Sevens sevens team.

Head coach: Jack Hanratty

No.	Player	Date of birth (age)
1	Florence Symonds	20 May 2002 (aged 20)
2	Krissy Scurfield	15 June 2003 (aged 19)
3	Pamphinette Buisa	28 December 1996 (aged 25)
4	Breanne Nicholas	20 February 1994 (aged 28)
5	Nakisa Levale	12 March 1997 (aged 25)
6	Emma Chown	17 December 1995 (aged 26)
7	Chloe Daniels	27 April 2003 (aged 19)
8	Olivia Apps	1 December 1998 (aged 23)
9	Fancy Bermudez	27 May 2002 (aged 20)
10	Piper Logan	13 July 2001 (aged 21)
11	Keyara Wardley	27 January 2000 (aged 22)
12	Olivia De Couvreur	20 February 2000 (aged 22)

== China ==
The following team was announced as the 2022 Rugby World Cup Sevens sevens team.

Head coach: Osea Kolinisau

No.	Player	Date of birth (age)
1	Ruan Hongting	6 October 1995 (aged 26)
2	Yan Meiling	14 January 1997 (aged 25)
3	Wang Xiao	12 October 1998 (aged 23)
4	Zhao Ying	7 January 1997 (aged 25)
5	Lyu Hewen	1 August 1996 (aged 26)
6	Sun Yue	31 December 1999 (aged 22)
7	Chen Keyi	23 July 1995 (aged 27)
8	Zhou Yan	5 June 1998 (aged 24)
9	Xu Xiaoyan	29 January 1998 (aged 24)
10	Gu Yaoyao	22 November 1995 (aged 26)
11	Liu Xiaoqian	16 February 1996 (aged 26)
12	Yang Danxu	7 July 1999 (aged 23)

== Colombia ==
The following team was announced as the 2022 Rugby World Cup Sevens sevens team.

Head coach: Sebastian Mejia Gil

No.	Player	Date of birth (age)
1	Maribel Mestra	13 July 2001 (aged 21)
2	Carmen Ibarra	24 August 2000 (aged 22)
3	Marcela Osorio	15 June 2000 (aged 22)
4	Daniela Alzate	20 December 1998 (aged 23)
5	Valentina Álvarez	4 April 2000 (aged 22)
6	Valeria Muñoz	28 October 2001 (aged 20)
7	María Arzuaga	15 April 1998 (aged 24)
8	Sara Florez Arenas	12 July 1996 (aged 26)
9	Camila Lopera (captain)	18 April 1995 (aged 27)
10	Laura Mejía	9 August 2000 (aged 22)
11	Juliana Soto	20 May 1999 (aged 23)
12	Valentina Tapías	27 May 2001 (aged 21)

== England ==
The following team was announced as the 2022 Rugby World Cup Sevens sevens team.

Head coach: James Rodwell

No.	Player	Date of birth (age)
1	Jade Shekells	28 September 1996 (aged 25)
2	Abbie Brown	10 April 1996 (aged 26)
3	Alicia Maude	17 May 2002 (aged 20)
4	Grace Crompton	30 October 2001 (aged 20)
5	Heather Cowell	23 January 1996 (aged 26)
6	Lauren Torley	2 September 1999 (aged 23)
7	Emma Uren	1 October 1997 (aged 24)
8	Celia Quansah	26 October 1995 (aged 26)
9	Isla Norman-Bell	21 February 2000 (aged 22)
10	Megan Jones	23 October 1996 (aged 25)
11	Ellie Boatman	13 May 1997 (aged 25)
12	Amy Wilson-Hardy	13 September 1991 (aged 30)

== Fiji ==
The following team was announced as the 2022 Rugby World Cup Sevens sevens team.

Head coach: Saiasi Fuli

No.	Player	Date of birth (age)
1	Vasiti Solikoviti	2 August 1993 (aged 29)
2	Vani Buleki	23 October 2000 (aged 21)
3	Raijieli Daveua	30 May 1992 (aged 30)
4	Rusila Nagasau	4 August 1987 (aged 35)
5	Verenaisi Ditavutu	7 September 1999 (aged 23)
6	Reapi Uluinasau	2 November 1994 (aged 27)
7	Lavena Cavuru	28 June 1994 (aged 28)
8	Ana Naimasi	21 February 1994 (aged 28)
9	Viniana Riwai	6 June 1991 (aged 31)
10	Sesenieli Donu	3 March 1996 (aged 26)
11	Alowesi Nakoci	18 August 1991 (aged 31)
12	Lavenia Tinai	7 September 1990 (aged 32)

== France ==
The following team was announced as the 2022 Rugby World Cup Sevens sevens team.

Head coach: David Courteix

No.	Player	Date of birth (age)
1	Séraphine Okemba	3 December 1995 (aged 26)
2	Ian Jason	18 January 1997 (aged 25)
3	Chloé Pelle	14 November 1989 (aged 32)
4	Lou Noel	25 November 2000 (aged 21)
5	Jade Ulutule	12 October 1992 (aged 29)
6	Joanna Grisez	5 October 1996 (aged 25)
7	Alycia Chrystiaens	12 January 2001 (aged 21)
8	Camille Grassineau	10 September 1990 (aged 31)
9	Carla Neisen	8 March 1996 (aged 26)
10	Yolaine Yengo	24 April 1993 (aged 29)
11	Lilou Graciet	26 February 2004 (aged 18)
12	Lili Dezou	8 July 2004 (aged 18)

== Ireland ==
The following team was announced as the 2022 Rugby World Cup Sevens sevens team.

Head coach: Aiden McNulty

No.	Player	Date of birth (age)
1	Erin King	21 October 2003 (aged 18)
2	Katie Heffernan	8 September 1998 (aged 24)
3	Stacey Flood	5 August 1996 (aged 26)
4	Brittany Hogan	19 September 1998 (aged 23)
5	Amee-Leigh Murphy Crowe	26 April 1995 (aged 27)
6	Kathy Baker	23 June 1998 (aged 24)
7	Beibhinn Parsons	30 November 2001 (aged 20)
8	Megan Burns	9 April 2000 (aged 22)
9	Lucy Mulhall	29 September 1993 (aged 28)
10	Eve Higgins	23 June 1999 (aged 23)
11	Kate Farrell McCabe	4 January 2001 (aged 21)
12	Emily Lane	10 January 1999 (aged 23)

== Japan ==
The following team was announced as the 2022 Rugby World Cup Sevens sevens team.

Head coach: Miho Tobimatsu

No.	Player	Date of birth (age)
1	Chiharu Nakamura	25 April 1988 (aged 34)
2	Marin Kajiki	20 September 1999 (aged 22)
3	Chiaki Saegusa	21 March 1997 (aged 25)
4	Fumiko Ohtake	2 February 1999 (aged 23)
5	Sakura Mizutani	13 December 2003 (aged 18)
6	Yume Hirano	15 March 2000 (aged 22)
7	Yume Okuroda	6 July 1994 (aged 28)
8	Mei Otani	28 May 2000 (aged 22)
9	Mifuyu Koide	21 December 1995 (aged 26)
10	Hana Nagata	19 May 2000 (aged 22)
11	Wakaba Hara	6 January 2000 (aged 22)
12	Michiyo Suda	25 February 2003 (aged 19)

== Madagascar ==
The following team was announced as the 2022 Rugby World Cup Sevens sevens team.

Head coach: Hajasoa Maminarivo Andriamaro

No.	Player	Date of birth (age)
1	Sarindra Sahondramalala	4 March 1993 (aged 29)
2	Claudia Rasoarimalala	7 August 1985 (aged 37)
3	Delphine Raharimalala	30 April 1994 (aged 28)
4	Felana Rakotoarison	21 January 1993 (aged 29)
5	Joelà Mirasoa Fenohasina	1 March 1995 (aged 27)
6	Zoanah Fanantenana	10 February 2003 (aged 19)
7	Ericka Razakaniaina	26 March 2004 (aged 18)
8	Marie Bodonandrianina	16 March 1997 (aged 25)
9	Ginah Raharimalala	8 May 1997 (aged 25)
10	Jinah Kelly Razanamahefa	26 May 2000 (aged 22)
11	Veronique Rasoanekena	17 June 1997 (aged 25)
12	Monica Rasoloniaina	14 April 2000 (aged 22)

== New Zealand ==
The following team was announced as the 2022 Rugby World Cup Sevens sevens team.

Head coach: Cory Sweeney

No.	Player	Date of birth (age)
1	Risi Pouri-Lane	28 May 2000 (aged 22)
2	Shiray Kaka	26 March 1995 (aged 27)
3	Stacey Fluhler	3 November 1995 (aged 26)
4	Niall Williams	21 April 1988 (aged 34)
5	Sarah Hirini	9 December 1992 (aged 29)
6	Michaela Blyde	29 December 1995 (aged 26)
7	Jazmin Hotham	2 July 2000 (aged 22)
8	Kelly Brazier	28 October 1989 (aged 32)
9	Tenika Willison	7 December 1997 (aged 24)
10	Jorja Miller	8 February 2004 (aged 18)
11	Portia Woodman	12 July 1991 (aged 31)
12	Alena Saili	13 December 1998 (aged 23)

== Poland ==
The following team was announced as the 2022 Rugby World Cup Sevens sevens team.

Head coach: Janusz Urbanowicz

No.	Player	Date of birth (age)
1	Julianna Schuster	17 May 1997 (aged 25)
2	Tamara Czumer-Iwin	16 January 1991 (aged 31)
3	Małgorzata Kołdej	12 November 1990 (aged 31)
4	Marta Morus	9 August 2003 (aged 19)
5	Katarzyna Paszczyk	25 October 1992 (aged 29)
6	Anna Klichowska	25 March 1993 (aged 29)
7	Karolina Jaszczyszyn	6 June 1988 (aged 34)
8	Hanna Maliszewska	19 April 1992 (aged 30)
9	Julia Druzgała	28 April 2004 (aged 18)
10	Natalia Pamięta	28 August 1999 (aged 23)
11	Sylwia Witkowska	14 April 1996 (aged 26)
12	Ilona Zaishliuk	10 October 1997 (aged 24)

== South Africa ==
The following team was announced as the 2022 Rugby World Cup Sevens sevens team.

Head coach: Paul Delport

No.	Player	Date of birth (age)
1	Lerato Makua	7 December 1999 (aged 22)
2	Simamkele Namba	3 October 1998 (aged 23)
3	Ayanda Malinga	23 June 1998 (aged 24)
4	Zintle Mpupha	25 December 1993 (aged 28)
5	Marlize de Bruin	11 November 1994 (aged 27)
6	Felicia Jacobs	7 April 1998 (aged 24)
7	Eloise Webb	5 March 1996 (aged 26)
8	Sizophila Solontsi	9 March 1992 (aged 30)
9	Nadine Roos	9 May 1996 (aged 26)
10	Mathrin Simmers	3 March 1988 (aged 34)
11	Nolwazi Hlabangane	7 June 1995 (aged 27)
12	Unathi Mali	3 December 1989 (aged 32)

== Spain ==
The following team was announced as the 2022 Rugby World Cup Sevens sevens team.

Head coach: Pedro de Matias

No.	Player	Date of birth (age)
1	Eva Aguirre Diaz	22 January 1995 (aged 27)
2	Beatriz Dominguez	9 October 1995 (aged 26)
3	Amaia Erbina	13 March 1997 (aged 25)
4	Maria Calvo	16 February 1999 (aged 23)
5	Bruna Elias	20 January 2002 (aged 20)
6	María García	15 April 2000 (aged 22)
7	Paula Requena	5 February 1997 (aged 25)
8	Olivia Fresneda	4 January 1999 (aged 23)
9	Ingrid Algar	18 February 1998 (aged 24)
10	Marta Cantabrana Gil	14 January 2002 (aged 20)
11	Iera Echebarría	20 October 1992 (aged 29)
12	Amalia Argudo	24 January 2000 (aged 22)

== United States ==
The following team was announced as the 2022 Rugby World Cup Sevens sevens team.

Head coach: Emilie Bydwell

No.	Player	Date of birth (age)
1	Cheta Emba	16 July 1993 (aged 29)
2	Ilona Maher	12 August 1996 (aged 26)
3	Kayla Canett	29 April 1998 (aged 24)
4	Nicole Heavirland	25 February 1995 (aged 27)
5	Sammy Sullivan	22 May 1998 (aged 24)
6	Lauren Doyle (captain)	23 February 1991 (aged 31)
7	Naya Tapper	3 August 1994 (aged 28)
8	Jazmine Gray	23 February 1993 (aged 29)
9	Joanne Fa'avesi	5 February 1992 (aged 30)
10	Alena Olsen	12 June 1995 (aged 27)
11	Kristen Thomas	1 July 1993 (aged 29)
12	Kristi Kirshe	14 October 1994 (aged 27)
