= Veroeshka Grain =

South African rugby union and sevens player

- Full name: Veroeshka Jasmine Grain
- Born: 11 December 1990 (age 35) Paarl, South Africa
- Height: 165 cm (5 ft 5 in)
- Weight: 61 kg (134 lb; 9 st 8 lb)

Rugby union career
Senior career
Years	Team	Apps	(Points)
- Boland Dames
International career
Years	Team	Apps	(Points)
- South Africa
National sevens team
Years	Team		Comps
2012–Present	South Africa		

Veroeshka Jasmine Grain (born 11 December 1990) is a South African rugby union and sevens player. She competed for South Africa at the 2024 Summer Olympics.

== Rugby career ==
Grain competed at the 2013 Rugby World Cup Sevens, 2014 Women's Rugby World Cup, 2017–18 World Rugby Women's Sevens Series, 2018 Commonwealth Games, 2023 WXV, and 2023–24 SVNS.

She is captain of the DHL Western Province Women. She was a member of the South African sevens side that competed at the 2024 Summer Olympics in Paris.
