= Su Qi (rugby union) =

Chinese rugby sevens player

- Born: 7 January 2000 (age 26)
- Height: 180 cm (5 ft 11 in)
- Weight: 77 kg (170 lb; 12 st 2 lb)

Rugby union career
National sevens team
Years	Team	Comps
2018–Present	China	

Su Qi (born 7 January 2000) is a Chinese rugby sevens player. She competed for the Chinese women's sevens team at the 2024 Summer Olympics in Paris.
