= Lilou Graciet =

French rugby sevens player

- Born: 26 February 2004 (age 22)
- Height: 1.66 m (5 ft 5 in)
- Weight: 60 kg (132 lb)

Rugby union career
- Position: Fullback
Senior career
Years	Team	Apps	(Points)
2022–	Lyon OU		(0)
International career
Years	Team	Apps	(Points)
2023	France		(0)
National sevens team
Years	Team		Comps
2022–	France		
Medal record
Women's rugby sevens
Representing France
Rugby World Cup Sevens
Bronze medal – third place	2022 Cape Town	Team competition

Lilou Graciet (born 26 February 2004) is a French rugby player. She plays at Fullback for France at an international level and for Lyon OU.

== Rugby career ==
Graciet plays for Lyon OU Rugby. She was part of France's sevens team that won a bronze medal at the 2022 Rugby World Cup Sevens in Cape Town.

Graciet was named in France's fifteens squad for the 2023 Women's Six Nations Championship.
