= Milena Mariano =

Brazilian rugby sevens player

Milena Mariano Silva
- Born: 28 January 2000 (age 26)
- Height: 174 cm (5 ft 9 in)
- Weight: 65 kg (143 lb; 10 st 3 lb)

Rugby union career
National sevens team
| Years | Team | Comps |
| 2016–Present | Brazil | |

Milena Mariano Silva (born 28 January 2000) is a Brazilian rugby sevens player.

== Rugby career ==
Mariano competed for Brazil at the 2018 Rugby World Cup Sevens in San Francisco. She also won a bronze medal at the 2023 Pan American Games. She was named in the Brazilian women's sevens team that will compete at the 2024 Summer Olympics in Paris.
