= Gisele Gomes =

Brazilian rugby sevens player

Gisele Gomes dos Santos
- Born: 18 August 2003 (age 23)
- Height: 166 cm (5 ft 5 in)
- Weight: 64 kg (141 lb; 10 st 1 lb)

Rugby union career
National sevens team
Years	Team	Comps
2021–Present	Brazil	

Gisele Gomes dos Santos (born 18 August 2003) is a Brazilian rugby sevens player.

Gomes won a bronze medal at the 2023 Pan American Games in Santiago, Chile. She was named in the Brazilian women's sevens team that will compete at the 2024 Summer Olympics in Paris.
