= Mariya Pogrebnyak =

Russian rugby sevens player

- Full name: Mariya Vladimirovna Pogrebnyak
- Born: 1 July 1996 (age 30) Gatchina, Russia
- Height: 1.68 m (5 ft 6 in)
- Weight: 66 kg (146 lb)

Rugby union career
National sevens team
Years	Team	Comps
2021–Present	Russia	

Mariya Vladimirovna Pogrebnyak (Russian: Мария Владимировна Погребняк; born 1 July 1996) is a Russian rugby sevens player. She competed in the women's tournament at the 2020 Summer Olympics.
