= Lili Dezou =

French rugby sevens player

- Full name: Lili Valentine Maria Antonieta Dezou
- Born: 8 July 2004 (age 22) Toulouse, France
- Height: 1.70 m (5 ft 7 in)
- Weight: 70 kg (154 lb)

Rugby union career
- Position: Centre
Senior career
Years	Team	Apps	(Points)
2014–2019	Grenade Sports		
2019–	Stade Toulousain		
National sevens team
Years	Team		Comps
- France
Medal record
Women's rugby sevens
Representing France
Rugby World Cup Sevens
Bronze medal – third place	2022 Cape Town	Team competition

Lili Valentine Maria Antonieta Dezou (born 8 July 2004) is a French rugby sevens player. She plays for Stade Toulousain Rugby. She was part of the French sevens squad that won a bronze medal at the 2022 Rugby World Cup Sevens in Cape Town.

She was a member of the French women's sevens team that competed at the 2024 Summer Olympics.
