= Arisa Nishi =

Japanese rugby sevens player

- Born: 29 May 2004 (age 22) Osaka Prefecture, Japan
- Height: 164 cm (5 ft 5 in)
- Weight: 63 kg (139 lb; 9 st 13 lb)

Rugby union career
Senior career
Years	Team	Apps	(Points)
	Tokyo Sankyu Phoenix		(0)
International career
Years	Team	Apps	(Points)
2025–	Japan	2	(5)
National sevens team
Years	Team		Comps
2023–Present	Japan		

Arisa Nishi (born 29 May 2004) is a Japanese rugby union and sevens player. She competed for Japan at the 2024 Summer Olympics.

== Rugby career ==
Nishi made her international sevens debut for Japan at the Dubai leg of the 2023–24 SVNS tournament. She competed for Japan at the 2024 Summer Olympics in Paris.

She was selected in the Sakura fifteens squad for their tour to the United States in April 2025. She made her international fifteens debut against Kazakhstan on 25 May at the Asia Rugby Women's Championship in Fukuoka.
