= Ruan Hongting =

Chinese rugby sevens player

- Born: 6 October 1995 (age 31)
- Height: 182 cm (6 ft 0 in)
- Weight: 74 kg (163 lb; 11 st 9 lb)

Rugby union career
National sevens team
Years	Team	Comps
2018–Present	China	

Ruan Hongting (born 6 October 1995) is a Chinese rugby sevens player.

== Rugby career ==
Ruan played for the Chinese women's sevens team at the 2018 Rugby World Cup Sevens in San Francisco.

She competed in the women's sevens tournament at the 2020 Summer Olympics. She represented China at the 2022 Rugby World Cup Sevens in Cape Town.

Ruan was selected for the Chinese sevens team and will be making her second Olympic appearance in the 2024 Summer Olympics in Paris.
