= 2023 Canada Women's Sevens =

1. REDIRECT Draft:2023 Canada Women's Sevens
