= Laura Rodríguez =

Laura Rodríguez may refer to:

- Laura Rodríguez (Chilean politician) (1957–1992)
- Laura Rodríguez Machado (born 1965), Argentine politician
- Laura Esther Rodríguez Dulanto (1872–1919), first female physician in Peru
