= Thalita Costa =

Brazilian rugby union player

- Born: May 30, 1997 (age 29)
- Height: 1.58 m (5 ft 2 in)
- Weight: 61 kg (134 lb)

Rugby union career
National sevens team
Years	Team	Comps
- Brazil 7s
- Correct as of 01 August 2021

Thalita da Silva Costa (born 30 May 1997) is a Brazilian rugby union player.

== Personal life ==
Her twin sister Thalia Costa also plays rugby sevens for Brazil. They were born in São Luís.

== Career ==
She was first called up to the national team in 2019, and was named in the Brazil squad for the 2020 Summer Olympics.

She will be competing for Brazil at the 2024 Summer Olympics in Paris.
