= Yasmim Soares =

Brazilian rugby sevens player

- Born: 5 May 1999 (age 27)
- Height: 165 cm (5 ft 5 in)
- Weight: 54 kg (119 lb; 8 st 7 lb)

Rugby union career
- Position: Fullback
Senior career
Years	Team	Apps	(Points)
	Melina		(0)
2026	Mumbai Dreamers		
International career
Years	Team	Apps	(Points)
2025–	Brazil	3	(5)
National sevens team
Years	Team		Comps
2022–	Brazil		

Yasmim Luiza de Lima Soares (born 5 May 1999) is a Brazilian rugby union and sevens player.

== Rugby career ==
Soares was part of the Brazilian team that won a bronze medal at the 2023 Pan American Games in Santiago, Chile. She was named in the Brazilian women's sevens team that will compete at the 2024 Summer Olympics in Paris.

She was named in Brazil's squad for the 2025 Women's Rugby World Cup in England.
