= Wang Xiao (rugby union) =

Chinese rugby sevens player

- Born: 12 October 1998 (age 28) Qingdao
- Height: 180 cm (5 ft 11 in)
- Weight: 75 kg (165 lb; 11 st 11 lb)

Rugby union career
National sevens team
Years	Team	Comps
- China

Wang Xiao (Chinese: 王笑, born 12 October 1998) is a Chinese rugby sevens player. She competed for the Chinese women's sevens team at the 2024 Summer Olympics in Paris. She was originally listed as a traveling reserve but played in the quarterfinal match against New Zealand.
