= Hanako Utsumi =

Japanese rugby sevens player

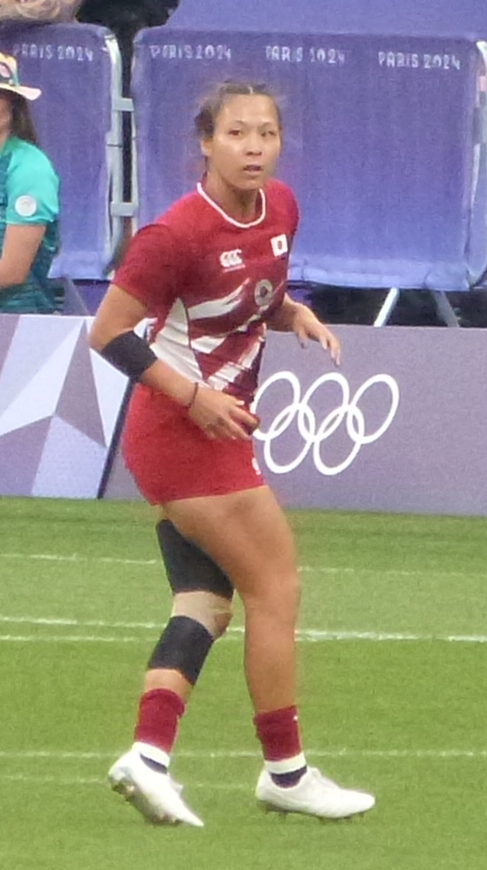
- Born: 16 March 2000 (age 26) Kanagawa, Japan
- Height: 160 cm (5 ft 3 in)
- Weight: 60 kg (132 lb; 9 st 6 lb)

Rugby union career
National sevens team
Years	Team	Comps
2021–Present	Japan	

Hanako Utsumi (born 16 March 2000) is a Japanese rugby sevens player. She competed for Japan at the 2024 Summer Olympics in Paris.
