= Megan Burns (rugby union) =

Irish rugby union player (born 2000)

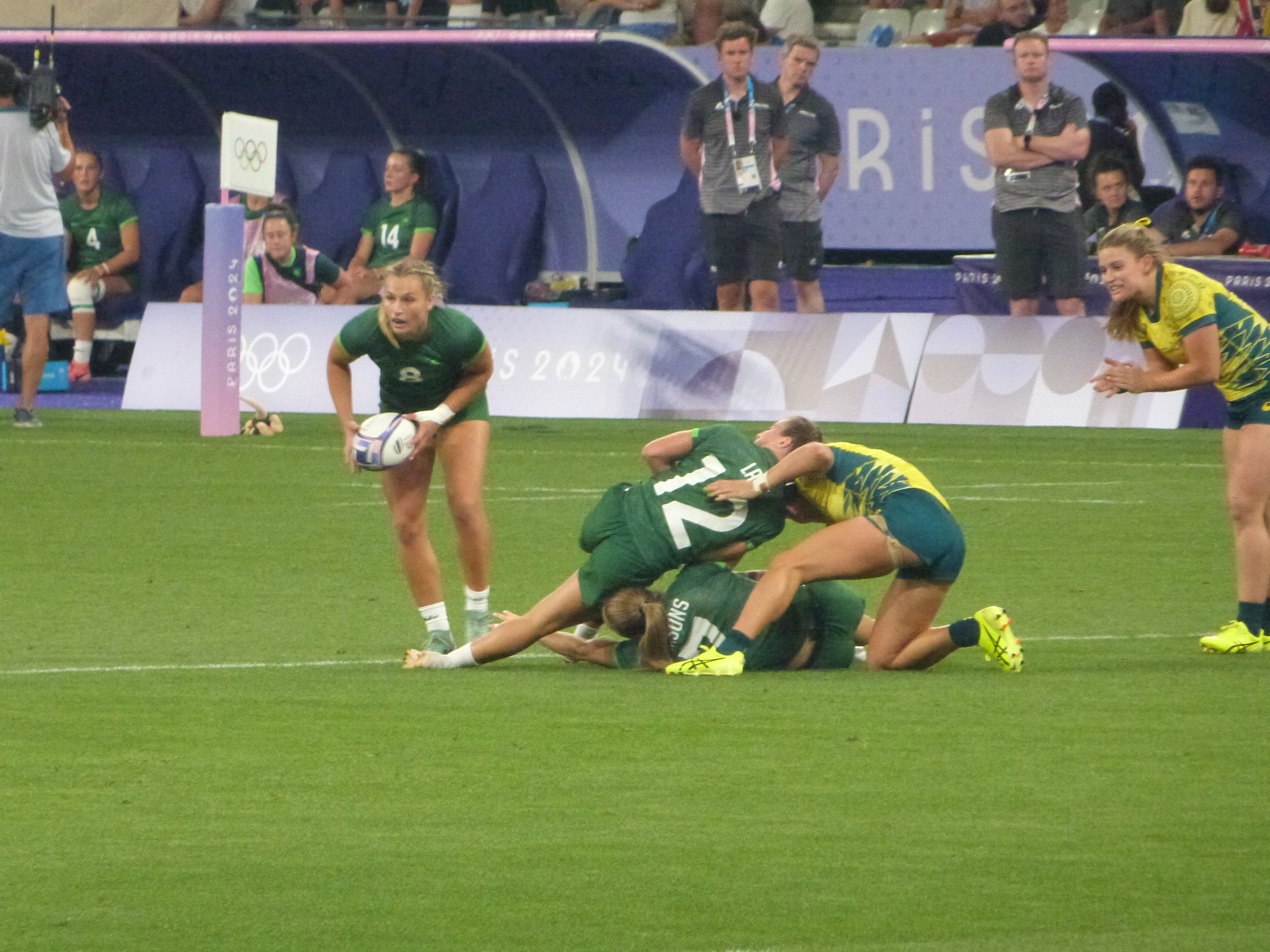
- Australia vs. Ireland, 2024 Summer Olympics rugby sevens
- Born: 9 April 2000 (age 26) Tullamore, County Offaly
- Height: 168 cm (5 ft 6 in)
- Weight: 61 kg (134 lb; 9 st 8 lb)

Rugby union career
National sevens team
Years	Team	Comps
2018-	Ireland	

Megan Burns (born 9 April 2000) is an Irish rugby union player. She plays for the Ireland women's national rugby sevens team since 2018, and represented her country at the 2022 Rugby World Cup Sevens and 2024 Olympic Games. Burns was named the Irish Sevens Player of the year in 2024.

== Career ==
Burns started playing rugby for Tullamore RFC under 15s, and helped Sacred Heart Tullamore to victory at the IRFU X7s in 2017, before going on to play for Leinster at under-18 level. She has also played for Blackrock College RFC in the All Ireland League. She made her senior debut for the Ireland women's national rugby sevens team in 2018.

After making her debut in the event in 2019, Burns became a regular for Ireland on the World Rugby Sevens Series. She was named in the Ireland squad for the 2022 Rugby World Cup Sevens – Women's tournament held in Cape Town, South Africa in September 2022.

In 2024, She competed for Ireland at the Summer Olympics in Paris, France. She started the pool game in which Ireland recorded a heavy 38–0 victory over South Africa, and started the game as Ireland's quarter-final match that saw Ireland beaten by Australia, on 29 July 2024. She scored a try in their final match against Great Britain which saw Ireland finish in eighth place overall. Burns won the Irish Sevens Player of the year award in 2024.

She continued to represent Ireland at rugby sevens, playing in the 2024-25 SVNS. She captained the side at the South Africa Sevens during the series.

== Personal life ==
Burns studied for a physiotherapy degree at University College Dublin. Her father John was head coach at Tullamore RFC.
