= Maria Rokotuisiga =

Fijian rugby union player (b.2001)

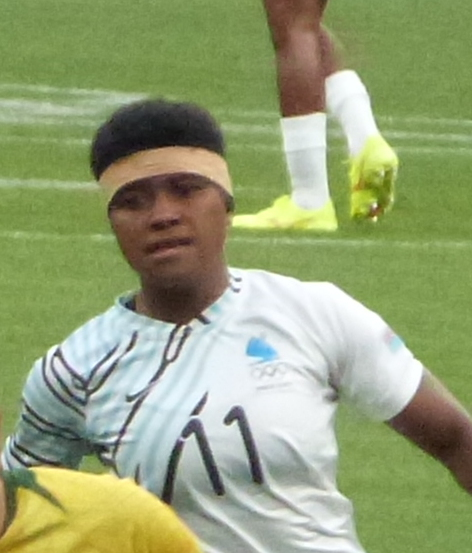
- 2024 Summer Olympics
- Born: 8 June 2001 (age 25)
- School: Gospel High School

Rugby union career
- Position(s): Scrum-half, wing
- Current team: Police Team
Senior career
Years	Team	Apps	(Points)
2022-	Police Team		
National sevens team
Years	Team		Comps
2022-	Fiji 7s		

Maria Rokotuisiga (born 8 June 2001) is a Fijian rugby union player. She played for Fiji sevens at the 2024 Paris Olympics.

== Early life ==
From Narokunibua Village, Namosi, she is the eldest of seven children and attended Gospel High School. She played for the Fijiana Under U18 team that reached the Plate semi-finals during the 2019 World School Sevens in Auckland.

== Career ==
She played domestically for the Striders team and Suva U18 before joining the Police team. She began training with the senior Fijian training group in 2021.

She is able to play on the wing and at half back. She made her debut for the Fiji women's national rugby sevens team in 2022 and played at the Oceania 7s. She was a non-playing reserve for the Fiji sevens team at the 2022 Commonwealth Games. She was called up to the Fiji seven team for the SVNS World Series in Hamilton, New Zealand in January 2023.

She scored a try as Fiji won the Oceania Rugby Championship Olympic Qualifier women's final against Papua New Guinea in November 2023. She was subsequently named in the Fiji sevens team for the 2024 Paris Olympics.
