= Isadora Lopes de Souza =

- Born: 3 August 1997 (age 29)
- Height: 1.67 m (5 ft 6 in)
- Weight: 63 kg (139 lb)

Rugby union career
- Position: Wing
Senior career
Years	Team	Apps	(Points)
	Melina		(0)
2026	Delhi Redz		
International career
Years	Team	Apps	(Points)
	Brazil	10	(20)
National sevens team
Years	Team		Comps
- Brazil

Isadora Lopes de Souza (born 3 August 1997) is a Brazilian rugby union and sevens player. She represented Brazil at the 2024 Summer Olympics.

== Rugby career ==
Lopes represented Brazil at the 2022 Rugby World Cup Sevens in Cape Town. They defeated Spain 19–17 in the 11th-place final to finish eleventh overall.

She competed for Brazil at the 2024 Summer Olympics in Paris.

In July 2025, she was named in Brazil's fifteens squad for the Women's Rugby World Cup in England.
