= Sammy Sullivan =

American rugby union player (born 1998)

Sammy Sullivan OLY
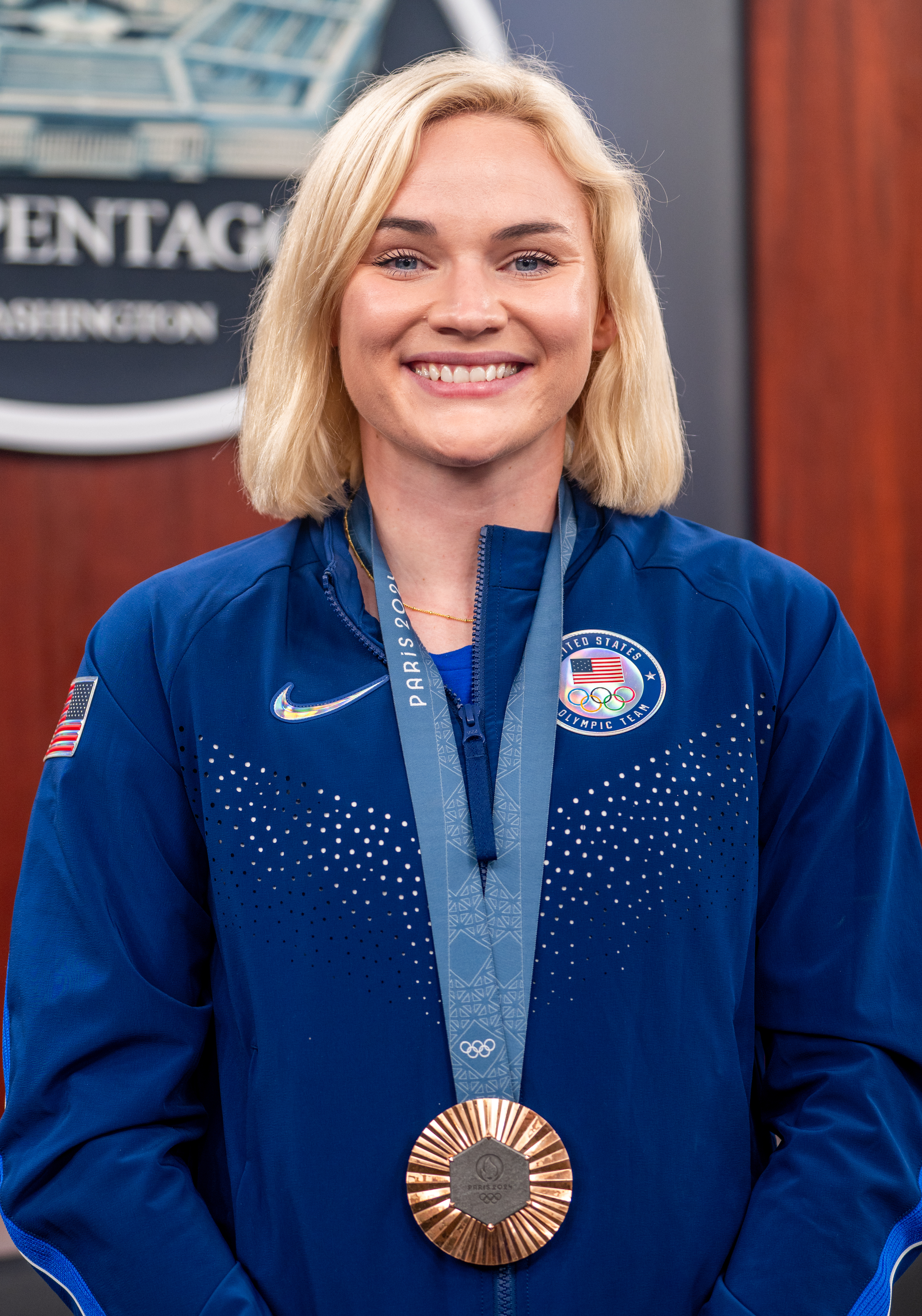
- Sullivan in 2024
- Full name: Samantha Sullivan
- Born: May 22, 1998 (age 28) Tacoma, Washington, U.S.
- Height: 5 ft 4 in (1.63 m)
- Weight: 143 lb (65 kg)

Rugby union career
National sevens team
Years	Team	Comps
2022–	United States	2
- Military career
- Allegiance: United States
- Branch: United States Army
- Service years: 2020–present
- Rank: Captain
Medal record
Women's rugby sevens
Representing United States
Olympic Games
Bronze medal – third place	2024 Paris	Team competition

Samantha "Sammy" Sullivan OLY (born May 22, 1998) is an American rugby sevens player. She competed for the United States at the 2024 Summer Olympics, where the team earned a bronze medal.

Originally from Fayetteville, North Carolina, Sullivan spent four years at the United States Military Academy in West Point, New York, where she played on the Women's Rugby team for three and a half seasons. Her spring 2020 7s season was canceled due to COVID-19. Sullivan played both 7s and 15s rugby as an Army Black Knight.

== Early life ==
Sullivan was born in Tacoma, Washington, to Michael Sullivan, a U.S. Army colonel, and Cindy Sullivan, a math teacher. Growing up, she spent time in Germany, Kentucky, California, and Hawaii, but considers Fayetteville, North Carolina, home. She has a twin brother.

After graduating from Jack Britt High School in Fayetteville, North Carolina, Sullivan enrolled at West Point in the fall of 2016.

== Rugby career ==
=== College career ===
Sullivan joined the rugby program at the start of her freshman year at West Point and became a starter just three games in. Sullivan played rugby 15s in the fall and rugby 7s in the spring.

During her time as a Black Knight, Sullivan earned many accolades, becoming a 3x NIRA 15s All-American (2017, 2018, 2019), 2019 Prusmack Award winner, 2019 Collegiate Rugby Championship Tournament MVP, and a HSBC All-Academic Team honors, (2019–20). Sullivan became the first-ever rugby Army Athletic Association Award (AAA) recipient.

=== National Sevens career ===
2022 saw Sullivan make her XVs USA Rugby debut in 2022 Pacific Four Series against Canada, her USA Sevens National Team debut during the 2022 Rugby World Cup Sevens in Cape Town, and her World Rugby Series debut at Dubai Sevens in December. At the 2022 Rugby World Cup Sevens, the team lost to France in the bronze medal match and finished fourth overall.

Sullivan totals seven total caps with USA Rugby, 6 (7s) and 1 (XVs).

At the 2024 Summer Olympics, Sullivan was on the bronze medal-winning team for the United States.

=== Premier Rugby Sevens ===
2021

Sullivan played in the inaugural Premier Rugby Sevens season, suiting up with the Southern Headliners. Sullivan and the Headliners went 3–1 at the Championship Tournament, falling 28–14 to the Loonies in the Finals.

==== 2023 ====
Sullivan joined the Pittsburgh Steeltoes during the program's inaugural season. Sullivan and the Steeltoes participated in two tournaments throughout the summer as they were eliminated from advancing to the championship.

Sullivan opened the season tallying one try in the Eastern Conference Kickoff in Austin, Texas. The Steeltoes placed third at the first tournament of the year after falling 21–19 to her former team, the Headliners in the first round. The Steeltoes edged the Texas Team, 22–0 to clinch third place.

The Steeltoes hosted the Eastern Conference Finals at Highmark Stadium in Pittsburgh, Pennsylvania on July 23. However, the Steeltoes struggled to pull ahead at their home tournament as they finished in fourth place. The Steeltoes lost to the New York Locals, 22–14 in the knockout stages and then 29–0 to Texas in the third-place matchup.

== Personal life ==
Sullivan lives in Chula Vista, California. She married Josh Schnell in August 2024. She is a Lego enthusiast, crediting the toy with helping her mental health while training for the 2024 Olympics.

== Statistics ==
Team	Season	GP	Tries	Points	Tackles	Carries
Pittsburgh Steeltoes	2023	4	1	5	10	5
