= Chloé Pelle =

French rugby player

- Born: 14 November 1989 (age 36) Paris, France
- Height: 1.62 m (5 ft 4 in)
- Weight: 63 kg (139 lb)

Rugby union career
- Position(s): Prop, center, wing
Senior career
| Years | Team | Apps | (Points) |
| | RC Chilly-Mazarin | | (0) |
International career
| Years | Team | Apps | (Points) |
- France
National sevens team
| Years | Team | | Comps |
- France
Medal record
Women's rugby sevens
Representing France
Olympic Games
| Silver medal – second place | 2020 Tokyo | Team competition |
Rugby World Cup Sevens
| Bronze medal – third place | 2022 Cape Town | Team competition |

Chloé Pelle (born 14 November 1989) is a French international rugby union and rugby sevens player who has played for RC Chilly-Mazarin as a wing since 2020 and for the France women's national rugby union team since 2011.

== Biography ==
Pelle was born in Paris. As a youth, she played basketball. At the age of 20, she enrolled at the Ecole Centrale de Lille. She then started playing rugby sevens at the school and joined the Lille Metropole Rugby Club Villeneuve. She graduated with a degree in engineering and mathematics.

She is a cybersecurity analyst at a large French bank.

== Career ==
Pelle played for Lille Métropole Rugby Club Villeneuvois from 2010 to 2018. In June 2018, she left Lille Métropole RCV to join Stade français, with whom she played for two years. She currently plays for RC Chilly-Mazarin.

She played her first international rugby union game as part of the French team on October 29, 2011 against Italy. In 2017, she was selected to play in the 2017 Women's Rugby World Cup in Ireland. She is also a member of the French women's rugby sevens team.

She won a bronze medal at the 2022 Rugby World Cup Sevens.

== Summer Olympics ==
Pelle competed at the 2020 Tokyo Summer Olympics, where the team won a silver medal.

At Los Angeles on 2 and 3 March 2024 she competed in her fiftieth international sevens tournament. At the time only five other women had reached this milestone, among them being Charlotte Caslick, Sharni Williams and Portia Woodman.

She competed for France at the 2024 Summer Olympics.

== Awards ==
- Ordre national du Mérite (September 8, 2021 decree)
