= Iän Jason =

French rugby player

- Born: 18 January 1997 (age 29)
- Height: 1.65 m (5 ft 5 in)
- Weight: 51 kg (112 lb)

Rugby union career
National sevens team
Years	Team	Comps
- France
Medal record
Women's rugby sevens
Representing France
Rugby World Cup Sevens
Bronze medal – third place	2022 Cape Town	Team competition

Ian Jason (born 18 January 1997) is a French rugby sevens player. She was part of French sevens team that won a bronze medal at the 2022 Rugby World Cup Sevens in Cape Town. She competed for France at the 2024 Summer Olympics.
