= Mariana Nicolau =

Brazilian rugby sevens player

- Born: 16 November 1997 (age 28) São José dos Campos, Brazil
- Height: 163 cm (5 ft 4 in)
- Weight: 70 kg (154 lb; 11 st 0 lb)

Rugby union career
- Position: Centre
Senior career
Years	Team	Apps	(Points)
	São José		(0)
International career
Years	Team	Apps	(Points)
	Brazil	6	(10)
National sevens team
Years	Team		Comps
2013–	Brazil		

Mariana Nicolau da Silva (born 16 November 1997) is a Brazilian rugby sevens player.

== Rugby career ==
Nicolau competed in the women's tournament at the 2020 Summer Olympics. She represented Brazil at the 2022 Rugby World Cup Sevens in Cape Town.

She competed for Brazil at the 2024 Summer Olympics in Paris.

In July 2025, she was named in Brazil's squad for the Women's Rugby World Cup in England.
