= Marcelle Souza =

Brazilian rugby sevens player (born 1996)

- Born: 22 July 1996 (age 30)
- Height: 1.79 m (5 ft 10 in)
- Weight: 80 kg (176 lb)

Rugby union career
- Position: Back row
Senior career
Years	Team	Apps	(Points)
	Elshaddai		(0)
International career
Years	Team	Apps	(Points)
2025–	Brazil	7	(0)
National sevens team
Years	Team		Comps
	Brazil		37 (25 pts)

Marcelle da Cruz de Souza (born 22 July 1996) is a Brazilian rugby union and sevens player. She represented Brazil at the 2024 Summer Olympics.

== Rugby career ==
Souza represented Brazil at the 2022 Rugby World Cup Sevens in Cape Town. They defeated Spain 19–17 in the 11th-place final to finish eleventh overall.

She was named in the Brazilian women's sevens team that competed at the 2024 Summer Olympics in Paris.

In July 2025, she was subsequently named in Brazil's fifteens squad for the Women's Rugby World Cup in England.
