= Jazmine Gray =

American rugby player (born 1993)

- Born: February 23, 1993 (age 33)
- Height: 1.60 m (5 ft 3 in)
- Weight: 62 kg (137 lb)

Rugby union career
National sevens team
Years	Team	Comps
2021	United States	46 (160 pts)

Jazmine Gray (born February 23, 1993) is an American rugby sevens player.

== Biography ==
Gray was born and raised in Raleigh, North Carolina. She attended Norfolk State University and was an exercise science major. She also played on the college basketball team. She was a personal trainer at a gym that she co-owns with her brother, the Results Fitness Gym. Her rugby career began in 2019 when a client approached her about playing for a local club. A few months later, she was called by the USA Women Sevens team. She made her debut for the US Eagles sevens in 2021.

Gray competed for the United States at the 2022 Rugby World Cup Sevens in Cape Town. They lost to France in the bronze medal final and finished fourth overall.
