= Amaia Erbina =

Spanish rugby sevens player

- Full name: Amaia Erbina Araña
- Born: 13 March 1997 (age 29) Euskadi, Spain
- Height: 1.71 m (5 ft 7 1/2 in)
- Weight: 68 kg (150 lb; 10 st 10 lb)
- Notable relative: Lidia Erbina

Rugby union career
Senior career
Years	Team	Apps	(Points)
2016-2020	CR Cisneros		
2020-2021	Eibar RT		
2021-2022	Stade Toulousain		
2024-	Wests Bulldogs Rugby		
International career
Years	Team	Apps	(Points)
	Spain	22	
National sevens team
Years	Team		Comps
	Spain		156

Amaia Erbina (born 13 March 1997) is a Spanish rugby sevens player.

She was selected for the Spanish sevens team for the 2016 Summer Olympics. She was also part of the squad that won the 2016 Women's Rugby Sevens Final Olympic Qualification Tournament in Dublin, Ireland for a place at the Olympics.

Erbina competed at the 2022 Rugby World Cup Sevens in Cape Town.
