= Sakura Mizutani =

Japanese rugby sevens player

- Born: 13 December 2003 (age 22) Mie, Japan
- Height: 166 cm (5 ft 5 in)
- Weight: 65 kg (143 lb; 10 st 3 lb)

Rugby union career
- Position: Loose Forward
International career
Years	Team	Apps	(Points)
2025–	Japan	2	(5)
National sevens team
Years	Team		Comps
2021–Present	Japan		

Sakura Mizutani (born 13 December 2003) is a Japanese rugby union and sevens player. She competed for Japan at the 2024 Summer Olympics.

== Rugby career ==
Mizutani was a member of Japan's squad to the 2022 Rugby World Cup Sevens in Cape Town, South Africa. She also competed for Japan at the 2024 Summer Olympics in Paris.

She made her international debut for the Sakura fifteens against Kazakhstan on 25 May 2025 at the Asia Rugby Women's Championship in Fukuoka.
