= Florence Symonds =

Canadian rugby union and sevens player

- Born: 20 May 2002 (age 24) Hong Kong
- Height: 1.78 m (5 ft 10 in)
- Weight: 75 kg (165 lb)

Rugby union career
- Position(s): Wing, Outside Centre
International career
| Years | Team | Apps | (Points) |
| 2023– | Canada | 18 | (30) |
National sevens team
| Years | Team | | Comps |
| | Canada | | 17 (30 pts) |
Medal record
Women's rugby sevens
Representing Canada
Olympics
| Silver medal – second place | 2024 Paris | Team competition |
Women's rugby union
Representing Canada
World Cup
| Silver medal – second place | 2025 England | Team competition |

Florence Symonds (born 20 May 2002) is a Canadian rugby player. She won a silver medal at the 2024 Summer Olympics.

== Rugby career ==
Symonds competed for Canada at the 2022 Rugby World Cup Sevens in Cape Town. They placed sixth overall after losing to Fiji in the fifth place final. On 8 July 2023, she made her test debut for Canada's fifteens team against New Zealand at Ottawa. Her side went down 52–21.

She was chosen for the 2024 Summer Olympics in Paris, France. The team won a silver medal, coming from 0–12 behind to defeat Australia 21–12 in the semi-finals, before losing the final to New Zealand.

She was selected in the Canadian fifteens side for the 2025 Pacific Four Series. Later in July, she was named in Canada's Rugby World Cup squad.
