= Saiasi Fuli =

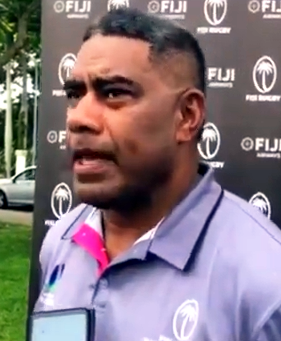
- Born: 16 March 1978 (age 48) Suva, Fiji
- Height: 5 ft 11 in (180 cm)
- Weight: 198 lb (90 kg)
- School: Lelean Memorial School
- University: University of the South Pacific

Rugby union career
- Position: Scrum-half
International career
Years	Team	Apps	(Points)
2004	Fiji	1	(0)
Medal record
Men's rugby sevens
Representing Fiji
Commonwealth Games
Silver medal – second place	2002 Manchester	Team competition

Saiasi Fuli (born 16 March 1978) is a Fijian rugby union coach and former international player.

== Biography ==
A scrum-half, Fuli hails from the Suva suburb of Nabua and attended Lelean Memorial School. He captained their under-17s to a national title and after leaving school played rugby for Suva. In 2002, Fuli was a member of the Fiji rugby sevens team, which won a silver medal at the Manchester Commonwealth Games. He played a 2004 Test match for the Fiji XV against Samoa in front of a home crown in Suva, coming on off the bench to earn his first cap.

Fuli coached the Fiji women's national rugby sevens team to a bronze medal at the 2020 Summer Olympics in Tokyo.

In 2021, Fuli was awarded a 50th Independence Medal for services to rugby.

== See also ==
- List of Fiji national rugby union players
