= Verenaisi Ditavutu =

Fiji international rugby union player

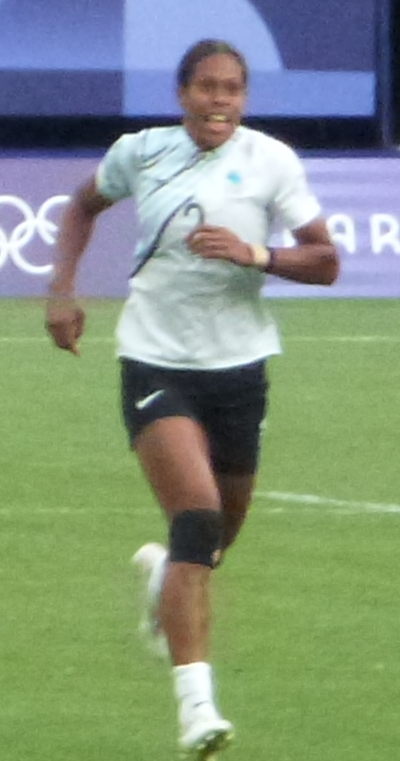
- Born: 7 September 1999 (age 27)
- Height: 1.73 m (5 ft 8 in)
- Weight: 76 kg (168 lb)

Rugby union career
- Position: Centre
International career
Years	Team	Apps	(Points)
2025–	Fiji	3	(0)
National sevens team
Years	Team		Comps
- Fiji
Medal record
Representing Fiji
Women's rugby sevens
Commonwealth Games
Silver medal – second place	2022 Birmingham	Team competition

Verenaisi Ditavutu (born 7 September 1999) is a Fijian rugby union and sevens player. She represented Fiji in sevens at the 2024 Summer Olympics.

== Rugby career ==
Ditavutu was part of the Fijiana sevens team that won the silver medal at the 2022 Commonwealth Games in Birmingham. She also competed at the Rugby World Cup Sevens in Cape Town.

She participated at the 2024 Summer Olympics for Fiji.

On 9 August 2025, she was named in the Fijiana XVs side to the Women's Rugby World Cup in England.
