= Thalia Costa =

Brazilian rugby union player

- Born: May 30, 1997 (age 29)
- Height: 1.53 m (5 ft 0 in)
- Weight: 55 kg (121 lb)

Rugby union career
National sevens team
Years	Team	Comps
- Brazil 7s
- Correct as of 01 August 2021

Thalia da Silva Costa (born 30 May 1997) is a Brazilian rugby union and sevens player. She represented Brazil in sevens at the 2020 and 2024 Summer Olympics.

== Personal life ==
Her twin sister Thalita Costa also plays rugby sevens for Brazil. They were born in São Luís.

== Rugby career ==
Costa was named in the Brazil squad for the Rugby sevens at the 2020 Summer Olympics. She represented Brazil at the 2022 Rugby World Cup Sevens in Cape Town, they placed eleventh overall.

She competed for Brazil at the 2024 Summer Olympics in Paris. In May 2025, she was named in the SVNS Dream Team for 2024-25. In March 2026, she scored a brace as Brazil defeated Kenya 24-12 to earn a place from SVNS Division 2 into the world championship finals of the 2025–26 SVNS season. She was subsequently given the Player of the Final Award in the final leg of SVNS 2.

In July 2026, Costa was one of the first players announced for the Ultimate Sevens Championship, ahead of the inaugural competition set to launch later that year.
