= Eve Higgins =

Ireland international rugby union player

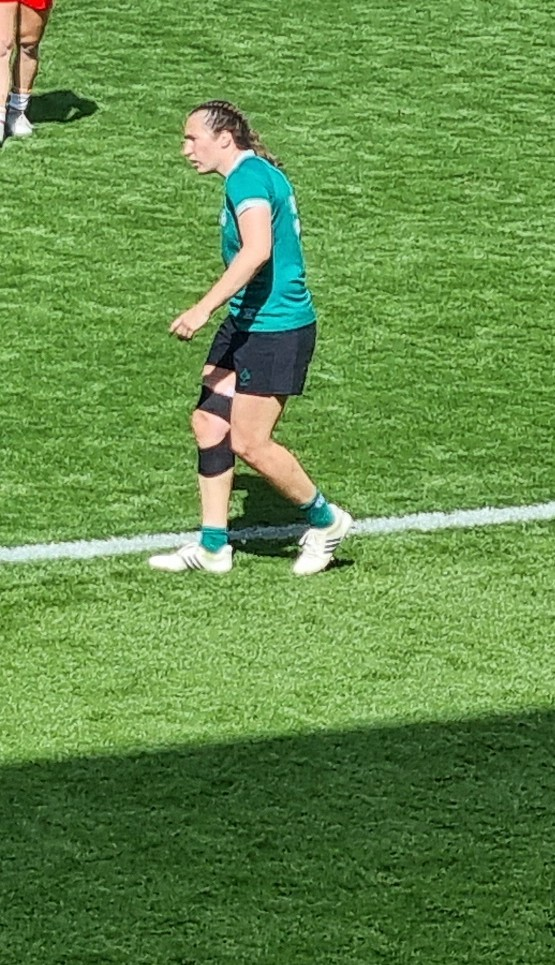
- 2025 Rugby World Cup in Northampton
- Born: 23 June 1999 (age 27) Dublin, Ireland
- Height: 173 cm (5 ft 8 in)
- Weight: 70 kg (154 lb; 11 st 0 lb)

Rugby union career
- Position: Centre
Amateur team(s)
Years	Team	Apps	(Points)
	Barnhall RFC		(0)
Senior career
Years	Team	Apps	(Points)
	Railway Union Sports Club		(0)
International career
Years	Team	Apps	(Points)
2021–	Ireland	32	(50)
- Correct as of 24 September 2025
National sevens team
Years	Team		Comps
2017–	Ireland 7s		

Eve Higgins (born 23 June 1999) is an Irish rugby player from Lucan, Dublin. She plays for Railway Union, Leinster rugby, the Ireland women's national rugby Sevens team and the Ireland women's national rugby union team. She is a student at University College Dublin.

== Club career ==
Higgins, whose family lived in Lucan before moving to Kilcock, started playing rugby in her local club Barnhall RFC in Leixlip which also produced Irish international Trevor Brennan. She played with boys’ teams up to Under-13 level. With no girls team in the club at the time her father emailed clubs around Dublin, leading her to join All-Ireland league side Railway Union.

== International career ==
Higgins first starred for Ireland as a play maker in Sevens rugby. In 2018, before her 19th birthday, she won her first senior cap with Ireland women's national rugby Sevens team at the Dubai 7s just two months after being on the U18 side that won the UK School Games. She played in 23 of Ireland's 27 games in the 2017–2018 World Rugby Women's Sevens Series and was among the nominees for its 'Rookie of the Year' award.

She was also a key player when Ireland had their best ever placing (sixth) at the 2018 Rugby Sevens World Cup, scoring their only try in the fifth/sixth-place playoff against Spain.

In the summer of 2018 Higgins did a two-month development placement with Bond University in Australia, playing in the Aon University Sevens.

In 2019 she was a member of the Ireland team who finished fourth at the Sydney 7s, their highest placing in a World Sevens Series tournament. She was selected on that tournament's 'Dream Team'.

In 2017, before she had sat her Leaving Cert, she was named in Ireland's extended XV squad for the 2017 Women's Rugby World Cup but didn't make the final cut. Higgins made her debut for the Ireland women's rugby union team (XVs) in the 2021 Women's Six Nations, starting at centre against Wales and France.

She competed for Ireland at the 2024 Summer Olympics in Paris.

She was named in Ireland's XVs side for the 2025 Six Nations Championship in March. She was announced as a member of the Irish squad to the Rugby World Cup in England.

== Personal life ==
Higgins studied history and sociology in University College Dublin.
