= Kristi Kirshe =

US international rugby union player (born 1994)

- Born: October 14, 1994 (age 32)
- Height: 5 ft 5 in (165 cm)
- Weight: 160 lb (73 kg)
- School: Franklin High School
- University: Williams College

Rugby union career
- Position(s): Center, Prop (7s)
International career
Years	Team	Apps	(Points)
2018–Present	United States		
National sevens team
Years	Team		Comps
2019–Present	United States		81 (215)
Medal record
Women's rugby sevens
Representing United States
Olympic Games
Bronze medal – third place	2024 Paris	Team competition

Kristi Kirshe (/ˈkɜːrʃi/ KUR-shee; born October 14, 1994) is an American rugby sevens player who has played for the U.S. Women's Rugby Sevens team since January 2019.

Kirshe started her rugby career with the Northeast Academy and Boston Rugby,from there she was selected to join the Women's Falcons at the Hokkaido Governor's Cup in 2018. She played in both the 2020 Summer Olympics in Tokyo and the 2024 Summer Olympics in Paris, where she won a bronze medal as a member of the U.S. Women's Rugby Sevens team. She was the only player to play every minute of every game for the USA team.

== Early life ==
Kirshe was introduced to soccer from a young age, playing with the Franklin Youth soccer program at 4 years old. Both of her parents, Greg Kirshe and Kathleen Kirshe, played soccer for Cornell.

Throughout childhood and young adulthood, Kirshe played a wide variety of sports. She was the quarterback on her Pop Warner football team and played soccer, basketball, and lacrosse for Franklin High School. Her senior year, the soccer team won the state championship.

== College career ==
Although Kirshe attended several Division I soccer camps, she ultimately decided to attend Williams College, where she hoped she'd find a better balance between school and sports.

While at Williams, Kirshe broke several Williams College records, including the records for goals in a single season and career wide goals. Kirshe also won several soccer awards, including the NESAC 2016 Player of the Year Award.

== Rugby career ==
After graduation, Kirshe began working at Boston based law firm Ropes and Gray. Kirshe soon found herself missing the thrill of competitive sports and decided to try rugby at the behest of Grace Conley, a high school teammate of Kirshe's and a rugby player at Boston University. While initially reluctant, Kirshe began playing rugby in spring 2018 for the Boston Women's Rugby Club. Within 6 months, Kirshe realized she was capable of playing rugby professionally.

=== U.S. National Sevens Team ===
Kirshe made her debut with the U.S. Eagles sevens team in Sydney in 2019. In 2021, she competed at the 2020 Summer Olympics in Tokyo. In 2022, She was again selected for the United States to compete at the 2022 Rugby World Cup Sevens in Cape Town. In 2024, she competed at the 2024 Summer Olympics in Paris and won a bronze medal.
