= Stacey Flood =

Ireland international rugby union player

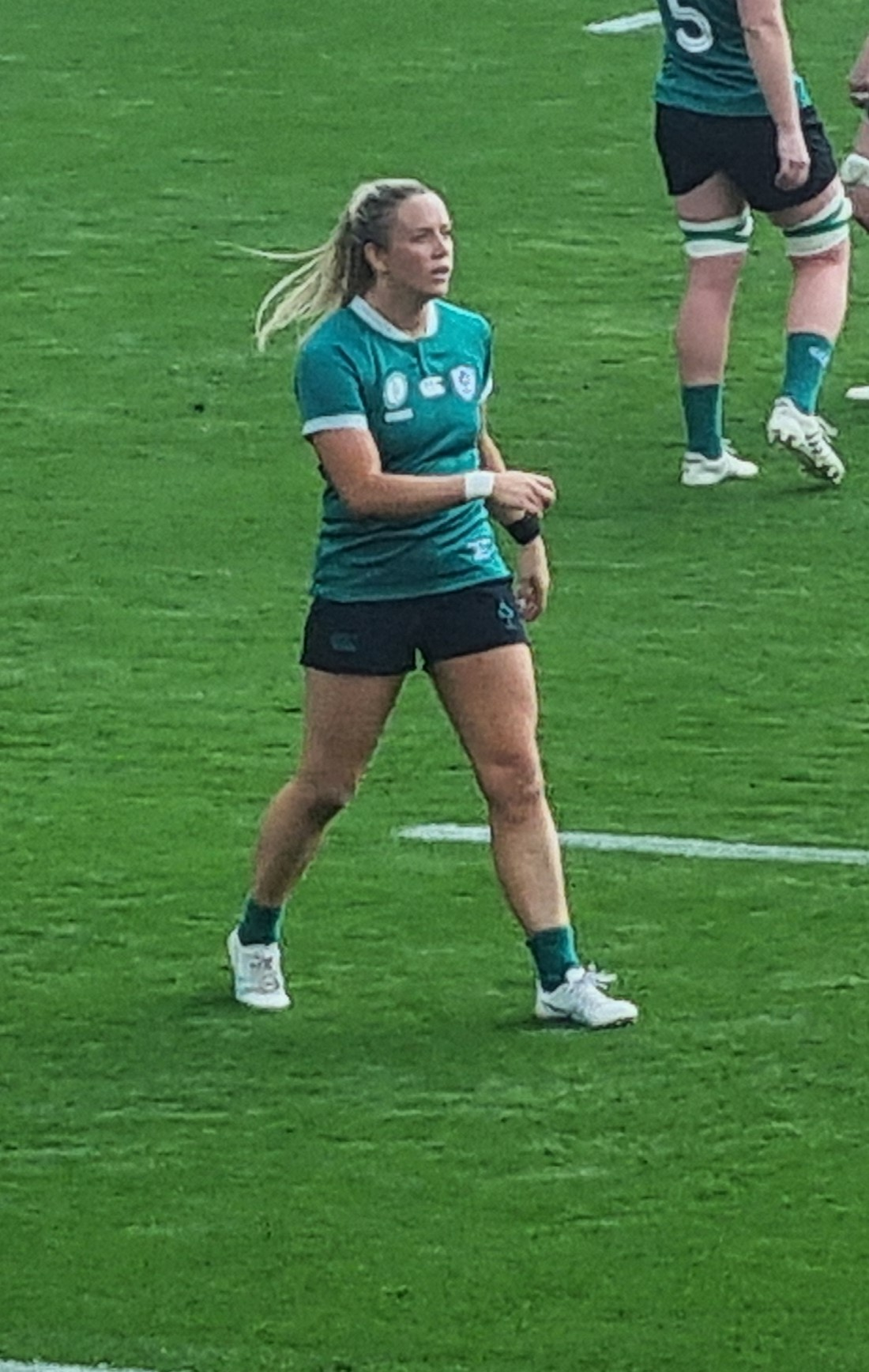
- Flood during the 2025 Rugby World Cup in Northampton
- Born: 5 August 1996 (age 30) Dublin, Ireland
- Height: 170 cm (5 ft 7 in)
- Weight: 69 kg (152 lb)

Rugby union career
- Position(s): Out-half, full back
Senior career
Years	Team	Apps	(Points)
2014–	Railway Union		(0)
International career
Years	Team	Apps	(Points)
2020–	Ireland	24	(37)
- Correct as of 14 September 2025
National sevens team
Years	Team		Comps
2015-	Ireland 7s		34

Stacey Flood (5 August 1996) is an Irish rugby player from Rathmines in Dublin. She plays for the Ireland women's national rugby Sevens team and the Ireland women's national rugby union team. She competed for Ireland at the 2024 Summer Olympics.

== Club career ==
Flood played ladies gaelic football for Clanna Gael Fontenoy GAA club and her county Dublin (up to Under-18 level) before she decided to focus fully on rugby. Her first taste of the game came when Railway Union coaches visited her school St Louis High School, Rathmines and she joined the club in 2014.

== International career ==
Flood came to rugby through the Ireland Women's Sevens pathway and first played for the Irish U18 Sevens side in 2014. She was contracted to Ireland's Sevens programme in 2015, aged 18. She made her international senior Sevens debut, in Kazan in 2015 and since then has played at every stage of the World Rugby Sevens Series.

In the summer of 2017 she did a work placement with Bond University in Australia and played rugby locally.

In May 2018 she was selected on the 'Dream Team' at the Canadian leg of the World Rugby Sevens Series.

She played in the 2018 Rugby World Cup Sevens in San Francisco and was a key player in Ireland's unsuccessful bid in 2019 to qualify for the Tokyo Olympics.

Flood was among five of Ireland's Sevens players called in to the national XVs squad in October 2020. In the 2021 Women's Six Nations she made her Ireland debut, as a replacement, against Wales. She was also a replacement against France and got her first Six Nations start against Italy. She is a left-footed place-kicker.

She competed for Ireland at the 2024 Summer Olympics in Paris.

She was named in Ireland's fifteens side for the 2025 Six Nations Championship in March. She was selected in the Irish squad for the 2025 Rugby World Cup in England.

== Personal life ==
Flood is the youngest of six children (four girls) from a particularly sporty Dublin family.

She played soccer with Cambridge Girls and gaelic football up to minor (Under-18) level with Dublin contesting an All-Ireland minor final in 2014. All four sisters won a county football title with Clanna Gael Fontenoy GAA club. Her sister Kim (seven years older) has also represented Ireland at Sevens and XVs rugby and played football for Dublin.

She has a degree in technology management from the National College of Ireland.
