= Rugby sevens at the 2024 Summer Olympics – Women's tournament =

2024 Women's Olympic Rugby Sevens Tournament
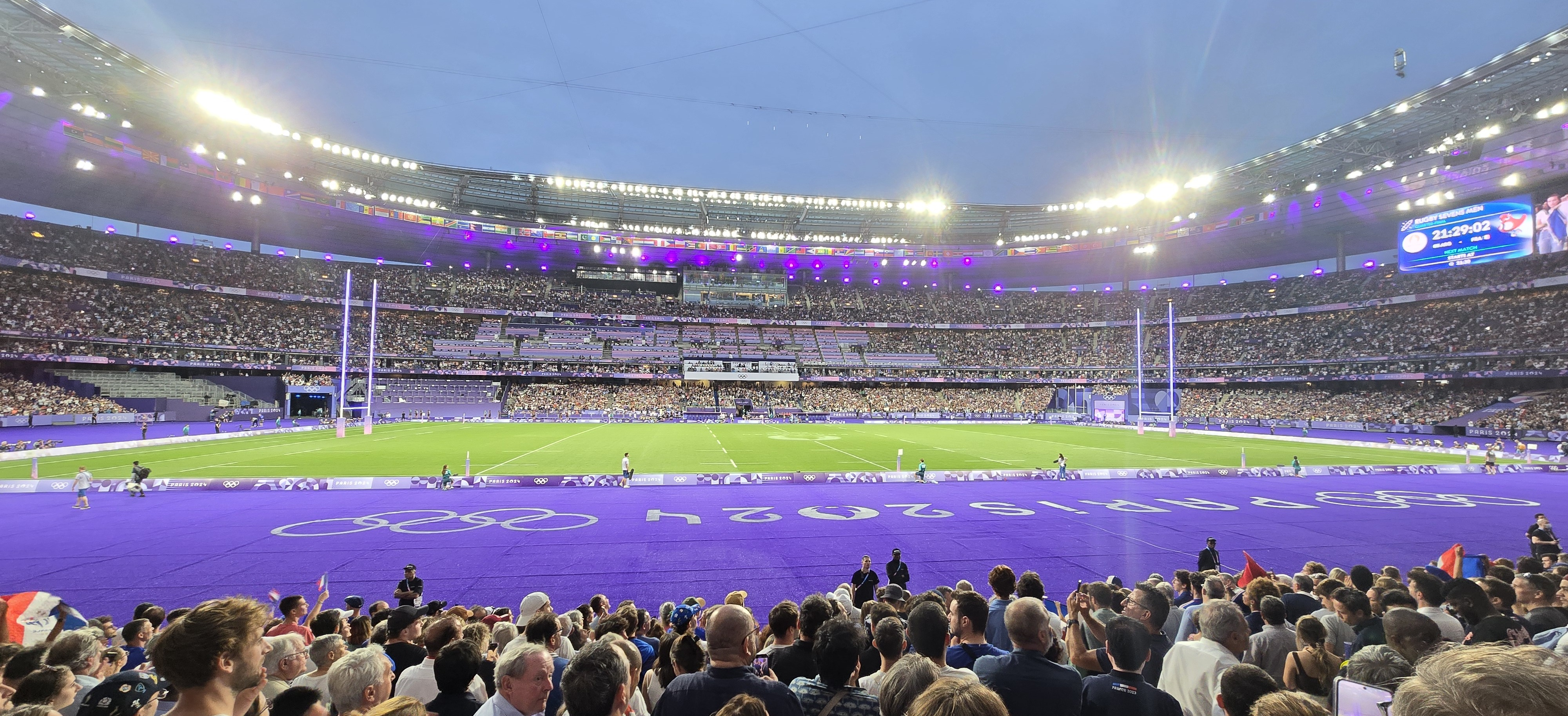
- Stade de France, the venue of the Women's Rugby Sevens tournament

Tournament details
- Host: France
- Venue: Stade de France
- Date: 28–30 July 2024
- Teams: 12

Final positions
- Champions: New Zealand (2nd title)
- Runner-up: Canada
- Third place: United States
- Fourth place: Australia

Tournament statistics
- Matches played: 34
- Top scorer(s): (Australia) Maddison Levi (70 points)
- Most tries: (Australia) Maddison Levi (14 tries)

The women's rugby sevens at the 2024 Summer Olympics was held at Stade de France, which also served as a host stadium of the 2023 Rugby World Cup. The tournament was played over three match days from 28 to 30 July 2024.

== Competition schedule ==
Legend

P	Pool stage	PM	Placing matches	¼	Quarter-finals	½	Semi-finals	B	Bronze medal match	F	Gold medal match

Schedule
Date	28 Jul		29 Jul			30 Jul				
Event	M	E	M	E		M		E		
Women's	P			PM	¼	PM	½	PM	B	F

== Qualification ==
Qualification	Date	Host	Berths	Qualified team
Host nation	—N/a		1	France
2022–23 World Rugby Women's Sevens Series	4 November 2022 – 14 May 2023	Various	4	New Zealand
2022–23 World Rugby Women's Sevens Series	4 November 2022 – 14 May 2023	Various	4	Australia
2022–23 World Rugby Women's Sevens Series	4 November 2022 – 14 May 2023	Various	4	United States
2022–23 World Rugby Women's Sevens Series	4 November 2022 – 14 May 2023	Various	4	(Republic of Ireland) Ireland
2023 South American Qualification Tournament	17–18 June 2023	(Uruguay) Montevideo	1	Brazil
2023 European Games	25–27 June 2023	(Poland) Kraków	1	(United Kingdom) Great Britain
2023 RAN Women's Sevens	19–20 August 2023	(Canada) Langford	1	Canada
2023 Africa Women's Sevens	14–15 October 2023	(Tunisia) Monastir	1	South Africa
2023 Oceania Women's Sevens Championship	10–12 November 2023	(Australia) Brisbane	1	Fiji
2023 Asian Qualification Tournament	18–19 November 2023	(Japan) Osaka	1	Japan
2024 Final Olympic Qualification Tournament	21–23 June 2024	Monaco	1	China
Total			12	

== Squads and officials ==
=== Squads ===
Each squad can have up to 12 players, as well as two traveling reserves in case of injury.

=== Officials ===
World Rugby revealed the 12 referees on 8 May 2024.

- (United Kingdom) Ben Breakspear (Scotland/Great Britain)
- Craig Chan (Hong Kong)
- Talal Chaudhry (Canada)
- Maggie Cogger-Orr (New Zealand)
- Ano Kuwai (Japan)
- Maria Latos (Germany)
- Cisco Lopez (United States)
- Tyler Miller (Australia)
- Lavenia Rawaca (Fiji)
- Kat Roche (United States)
- (United Kingdom) George Selwood (England/Great Britain)

== Group stage ==
=== Group A ===
Pos	Team	Pld	W	D	L	PF	PA	PD	Pts	Qualification
1	New Zealand	3	3	0	0	114	19	+95	9	Quarter-finals
2	Canada	3	2	0	1	50	64	−14	7	Quarter-finals
3	China	3	1	0	2	62	81	−19	5	Quarter-finals
4	Fiji	3	0	0	3	33	95	−62	3	

Source: World Rugby
Rules for classification: 1) Points; 2) Head-to-head result; 3) Point difference; 4) Points scored.

28 July 2024
17:30

Fiji	14–17	Canada
Try: Rokotuisiga 9' c Likuceva 15' c Con: Naimasi (1/1) 9'; Ulunisau (1/1) 15'	World Rugby	Try: Symonds 4' c Williams 6' m Wardley 12' m Con: Daniels (1/3) 5'

Stade de France, Paris
Referee: Craig Chan (Hong Kong)

28 July 2024
18:00

New Zealand	43–5	China
Try: Blyde (4) 2' m, 4' c, 6' m, 8' c Waaka (2) 7' m, 12' c Hirini 15' c Con: Pouri-Lane (2/5) 4', 9'; King (2/2) 13', 15'	World Rugby	Try: Liu 11' m

Stade de France, Paris
Referee: Ano Kuwai (Japan)

28 July 2024
21:00

Fiji	12–40	China
Try: Nakoci 3' c Delaiwau 9' m Con: Naimasi (1/2) 3'	World Rugby	Try: Wang 1' m Yang 5' c Yan 7' c Chen 8' c Liu 11' c Dou 13' c Con: Gu (4/4) 5', 8', 9', 12'; Chen (1/1) 13'

Stade de France, Paris
Referee: Maggie Cogger-Orr (New Zealand)

28 July 2024
21:30

New Zealand	33–7	Canada
Try: Miller (2) 2' c, 7' c Pouri-Lane 5' c Felix-Hotham 10' c Woodman-Wickliffe 13' c Con: King (3/4) 3', 8', 10'; Nuku (1/1) 13'	World Rugby	Try: Williams 4' c Con: Hogan-Rochester (1/1) 4'

Stade de France, Paris
Referee: George Selwood (England/Great Britain)

29 July 2024
16:00

Canada	26–17	China
Try: Williams (2) 5' c, 11' c Symonds 8' m Logan 14' m Con: Apps (1/1) 6'; Daniels (2/3) 8', 11'	World Rugby	Try: Chen 3' c Liu 8' m Wang 17' m Con: Chen (1/2) 4'

Stade de France, Paris
Referee: Finlay Brown (Scotland/Great Britain)

29 July 2024
16:30

New Zealand	38–7	Fiji
Try: Miller 1' c Felix-Hotham 5' c Waaka (2) 7' c, 9' c Blyde 10' m Nuku 13' m Con: Pouri-Lane (4/4) 1', 5', 8', 10'	World Rugby	Try: Buleki 14' c Con: Ulunisau (1/1) 15'

Stade de France, Paris
Referee: Kat Roche (United States)

=== Group B ===
Pos	Team	Pld	W	D	L	PF	PA	PD	Pts	Qualification
1	Australia	3	3	0	0	89	24	+65	9	Quarter-finals
2	(United Kingdom) Great Britain	3	2	0	1	52	65	−13	7	Quarter-finals
3	(Republic of Ireland) Ireland	3	1	0	2	64	40	+24	5	Quarter-finals
4	South Africa	3	0	0	3	22	98	−76	3	

Source: World Rugby
Rules for classification: 1) Points; 2) Head-to-head result; 3) Point difference; 4) Points scored.

28 July 2024
15:30

Ireland	12–21	Great Britain
Try: Murphy Crowe (2) 3' m, 10' c Con: Mulhall (1/2) 10'	World Rugby	Try: Norman-Bell 4' c Joyce 8' c Uren 10' c Con: Norman-Bell (3/3) 4', 8', 10'

Stade de France, Paris
Referee: Kat Roche (United States)

28 July 2024
16:00

Australia	34–5	South Africa
Try: M. Levi (4) 1' c, 6' c, 8' m, 10' m Nathan 4' m T. Levi 8' m Con: Hinds (2/6) 2', 7'	World Rugby	Try: Roos 16' m

Stade de France, Paris
Referee: Lavenia Rawaca (Fiji)

28 July 2024
19:00

Ireland	38–0	South Africa
Try: Parsons (2) 6' c, 12' c Murphy Crowe 8' c Flood 10' c Elmes Kinlan 14' m Higgins 15' m Con: Mulhall (1/1) 6'; Flood (3/5) 9', 11', 12'	World Rugby

Stade de France, Paris
Referee: Talal Chaudhry (Canada)

28 July 2024
19:30

Australia	36–5	Great Britain
Try: M. Levi (3) 3' c, 7' m, 10' m Terita (2) 8' c, 10' c T. Levi 14' m Con: Hinds (2/3) 3', 10'; T. Levi (1/3) 10'	World Rugby	Try: Cowell 2' m

Stade de France, Paris
Referee: Maria Latos (Germany)

29 July 2024
14:00

Great Britain	26–17	South Africa
Try: Crompton 8' c Norman-Bell 8' c Joyce (2) 11' m, 14' c Con: Norman-Bell (3/3) 8', 8', 15'	World Rugby	Try: Janse van Rensburg 1' c Roos 6' m Malinga 10' m Con: Roos (1/3) 1'

Stade de France, Paris
Referee: Tyler Miller (Australia)

29 July 2024
14:30

Australia	19–14	Ireland
Try: Nathan 1' c T. Levi 8' m M. Levi 9' c Con: T. Levi (1/2) 1'; Hinds (1/1) 10'	World Rugby	Try: Higgins (2) 6' c, 14' c Con: Higgins (2/2) 6', 14'

Stade de France, Paris
Referee: George Selwood (England/Great Britain)

=== Group C ===
Pos	Team	Pld	W	D	L	PF	PA	PD	Pts	Qualification
1	France (H)	3	3	0	0	106	14	+92	9	Quarter-finals
2	United States	3	2	0	1	74	43	+31	7	Quarter-finals
3	Japan	3	1	0	2	46	97	−51	5	
4	Brazil	3	0	0	3	17	89	−72	3	

Source: World Rugby
Rules for classification: 1) Points; 2) Head-to-head result; 3) Point difference; 4) Points scored.
(H) Hosts

28 July 2024
16:30

United States	36–7	Japan
Try: Levy 3' m Kirshe (2) 4' c, 6' m Sullivan 8' m Maher 9' c Sedrick 12' c Con: Canett (3/6) 5', 10', 13'	World Rugby	Try: Mizutani 2' c Con: Utsumi (1/1) 2'

Stade de France, Paris
Referee: George Selwood (England/Great Britain)

28 July 2024
17:00

France	26–0	Brazil
Try: Grisez 3' c Pelle 5' c Okemba 11' c Jason 15' m Con: Drouin (3/4) 4', 5', 11'	World Rugby

Stade de France, Paris
Referee: Cisco Lopez (United States)

28 July 2024
20:00

United States	24–5	Brazil
Try: Kelter 1' m Sullivan 8' c Maher 11' m Sedrick 15' c Con: Kelter (2/3) 9', 15'	World Rugby	Try: Thalia Costa 6' m

Stade de France, Paris
Referee: Tyler Miller (Australia)

28 July 2024
20:30

France	49–0	Japan
Try: Jason (3) 1' c, 7' c, 9' c Grassineau 3' c Drouin 5' c Ciofani 10' c Jacquet 13' c Con: Drouin (6/6) 2', 4', 5', 8', 9', 10'; Yengo (1/1) 13'	World Rugby

Stade de France, Paris
Referee: Finlay Brown (Scotland/Great Britain)

29 July 2024
15:00

Japan	39–12	Brazil
Try: Tsutsumi (2) 1' c, 10' m Saegusa 4' c Utsumi 6' m Kajiki (2) 6' m, 9' m Tanaka 14' m Con: Nishi (1/2) 1'; Tsutsumi (1/1) 5'	World Rugby	Try: Thalita Costa 7' m Lima 13' c Con: Fioravanti (1/1) 13'

Stade de France, Paris
Referee: Maggie Cogger-Orr (New Zealand)

29 July 2024
15:30

France	31–14	United States
Try: Okemba (4) 7', 8', 9' c, 14' c Jacquet 11' c Con: Drouin (2/4) 9', 11'; Yengo (1/1) 15'	World Rugby	Try: Maher 3' c Tapper 13' c Con: Canett (1/1) 3'; Olsen (1/1) 13'

Stade de France, Paris
Referee: Craig Chan (Hong Kong)

=== Ranking of third-placed teams ===
The top two of the third-placed teams advance to the knockout rounds.

Pos	Grp	Team	Pld	W	D	L	PF	PA	PD	Pts	Qualification
1	B	Ireland	3	1	0	2	64	40	+24	5	Quarter-finals
2	A	China	3	1	0	2	62	81	−19	5	Quarter-finals
3	C	Japan	3	1	0	2	46	97	−51	5	

Source: World Rugby
Rules for classification: 1) Points; 2) Point difference; 3) Points scored.

== Knockout stage ==
=== 9–12th place playoff ===
Semi-finals
29 July – Stade de France
Japan	15
South Africa	12
29 July – Stade de France
Fiji	22
Brazil	28

9th place match
30 July – Stade de France
Japan	38
Brazil	7
11th place match
30 July – Stade de France
South Africa	21
Fiji	15

==== Semi-finals ====
29 July 2024
20:00

Japan	15–12	South Africa
Try: Hara 4' m Kajiki (2) 12' m, 14' m	World Rugby	Try: Janse van Rensburg 1' m Roos 7'; Con: Roos (1/2) 8'

Stade de France, Paris
Referee: Cisco Lopez (United States)

29 July 2024
20:30

Fiji	22–28	Brazil
Try: Buleki 2' m Naimasi (2) 4' m, 13' c Likuceva 11'; Con: Naimasi (1/2) 13'	World Rugby	Try: Lima (2) 1' c, 8' c Costa 6' c Soares 15' c Con: Kochhann (4/4) 1', 6', 8', 15'

Stade de France, Paris
Referee: Talal Chaudhry (Canada)

==== Eleventh place match ====
30 July 2024
16:30

South Africa	21–15	Fiji
Try: Roos (2) 1' c, 4' c Mpupha 9' c Con: Roos (3/3) 2', 4', 9'	World Rugby	Try: Lomani 11' m Ditavutu 12' m Wilson 15' m

Stade de France, Paris
Referee: Ano Kuwai (Japan)

==== Ninth place match ====
30 July 2024
17:00

Japan	38–7	Brazil
Try: Kajiki 1' c Utsumi 3' c Ohtani 6' m Hirano 10' c Matsuda 13' c Tanaka 14' m Con: Utsumi (2/3) 1', 3'; Hirano (1/1) 10'; Nishi (1/2) 13'	World Rugby	Try: Soares 16' c Con: Kochhann (1/1) 16'

Stade de France, Paris
Referee: Lavenia Rawaca (Fiji)

=== 5–8th place playoff ===
Semi-finals
30 July – Stade de France
China	19
Great Britain	15
30 July – Stade de France
France	19
Ireland	7

5th place match
30 July – Stade de France
China	7
France	21
7th place match
30 July – Stade de France
Great Britain	28
Ireland	12

==== Semi-finals ====
30 July 2024
14:30

China	19–15	Great Britain
Try: Chen 3' c Yang 6' c Hu 16' m Con: Chen (1/1) 4'; Gu (1/2) 7'	World Rugby	Try: Kildunne 2' m Joyce 8' m Boatman 9' m

Stade de France, Paris
Referee: Cisco Lopez (United States)

30 July 2024
15:00

France	19–7	Ireland
Try: Okemba 9' c, 14' m Neisen 11' c Con: Drouin (2/2) 9', 12'; Yengo (0/1)	World Rugby	Try: Higgins 6' c Con: Higgins (1/1) 6'

Stade de France, Paris
Referee: Maggie Cogger-Orr (New Zealand)

==== Seventh place match ====
30 July 2024
18:00

Great Britain	28–12	Ireland
Try: Jones (2) 2' c, 9' c Shekells 7' c Cowell 9' c Con: Jones (1/1) 3'; Uren (2/2) 7', 16'; Norman-Bell (1/1) 9'	World Rugby	Try: Burns 5' m Boles 10' c Con: Flood (1/1) 14'

Stade de France, Paris
Referee: Tyler Miller (Australia)

==== Fifth place match ====
30 July 2024
18:30

China	7–21	France
Try: Liu 11' c Con: Dou (1/1) 11'	World Rugby	Try: Yengo 5' c Noel 9' c Pelle 12' c Con: Yengo (1/1) 5'; Drouin (2/2) 9', 13'

Stade de France, Paris
Referee: Maria Latos (Germany)

=== Medal playoff ===
Quarter-finals
29 July – Stade de France
New Zealand	55
China	5
29 July – Stade de France
Great Britain	7
United States	17
29 July – Stade de France
France	14
Canada	19
29 July – Stade de France
Australia	40
Ireland	7

Semi-finals
30 July – Stade de France
New Zealand	24
United States	12
30 July – Stade de France
Canada	21
Australia	12

Gold medal match
30 July – Stade de France
New Zealand	19
Canada	12
Bronze medal match
30 July – Stade de France
United States	14
Australia	12

==== Quarter-finals ====
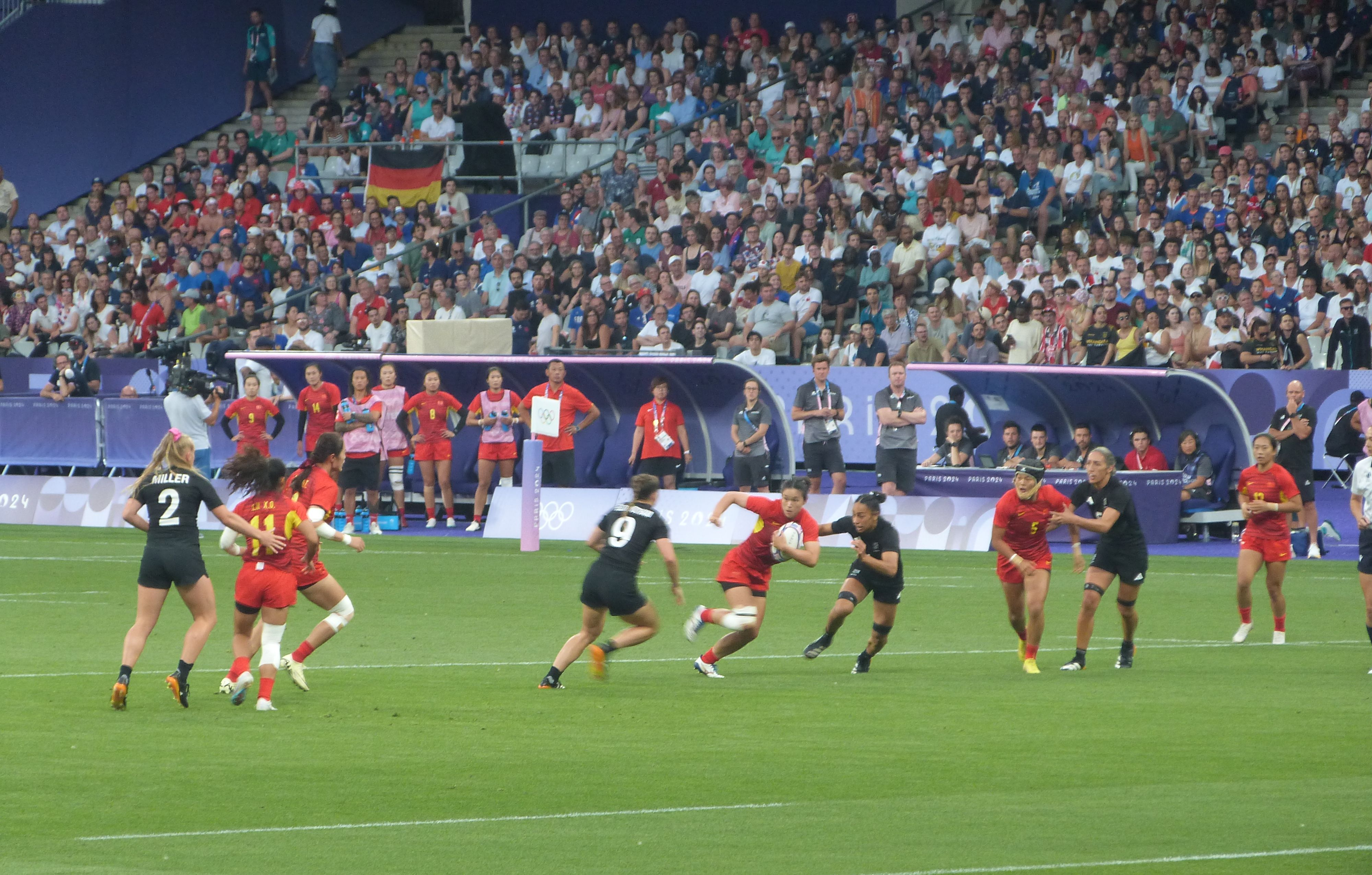
China breaking the line against New Zealand

29 July 2024
21:00

New Zealand	55–5	China
Try: Hirini (2) 1' c, 14' c Felix-Hotham (2) 6' c, 11' m Blyde (2) 7' m, 8' c Woodman-Wickliffe 8' m Paul (2) 12' c, 15' m Con: Pouri-Lane (2/4) 1', 6'; King (3/5) 9', 13', 14'	World Rugby	Try: Dou 4' m

Stade de France, Paris
Referee: Tyler Miller (Australia)

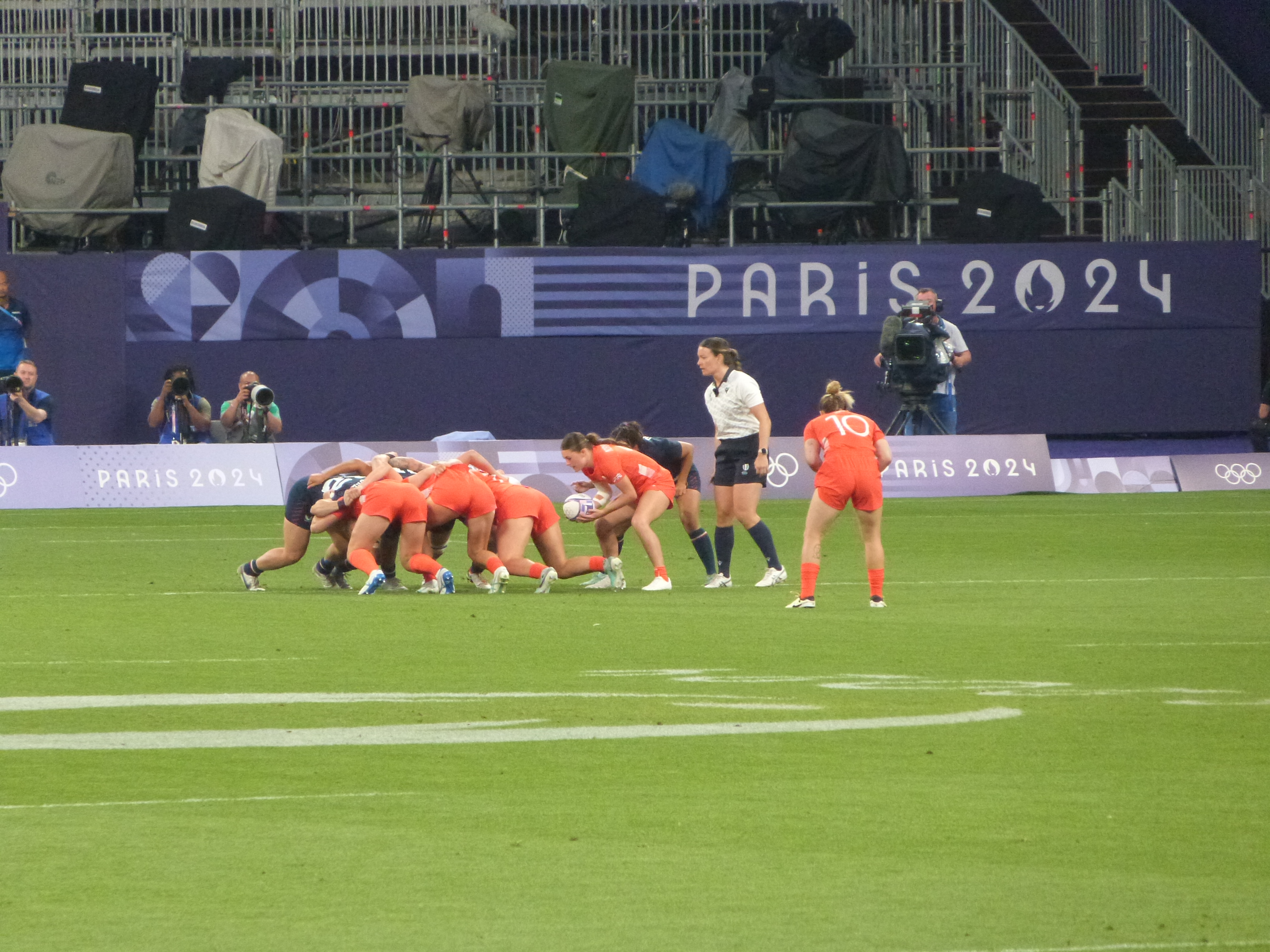
Great Britain scrum against the United States

29 July 2024
21:30

Great Britain	7–17	United States
Try: Boatman 2' c Con: Thomson (1/1) 2'	World Rugby	Try: Tapper 6' m Kirshe 8' c Sullivan 11' m Con: Canett (1/1) 8'

Stade de France, Paris
Referee: Maggie Cogger-Orr (New Zealand)

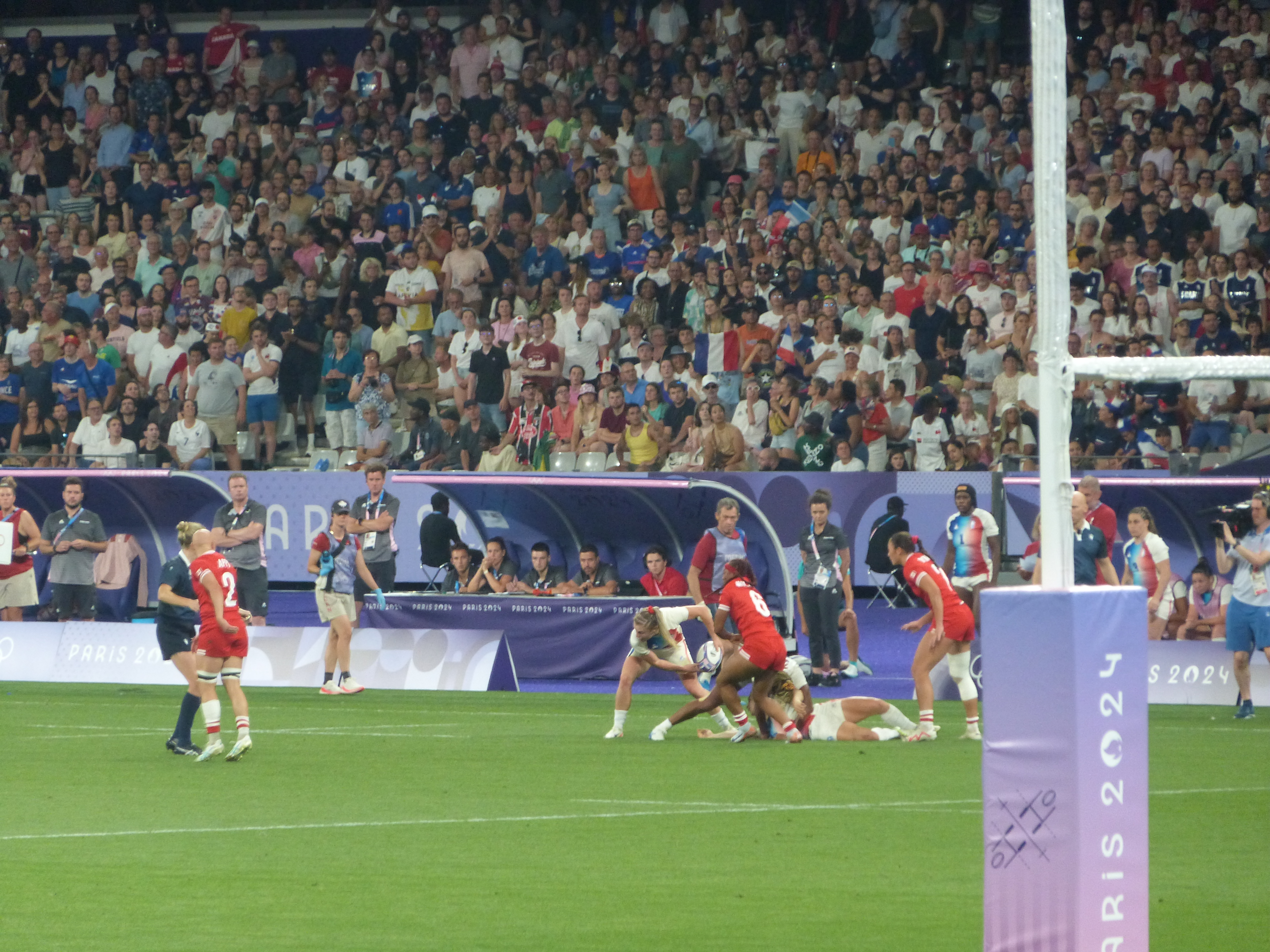
France passing the ball after a Canada tackle

29 July 2024
22:00

France	14–19	Canada
Try: Jason 8' c Yengo 8' c Con: Yengo (2/2) 8', 9'	World Rugby	Try: Logan (2) 4' c, 11' c Daniels 14' m Con: Daniels (1/2) 4'; Apps (1/1) 11'

Stade de France, Paris
Referee: Kat Roche (United States)

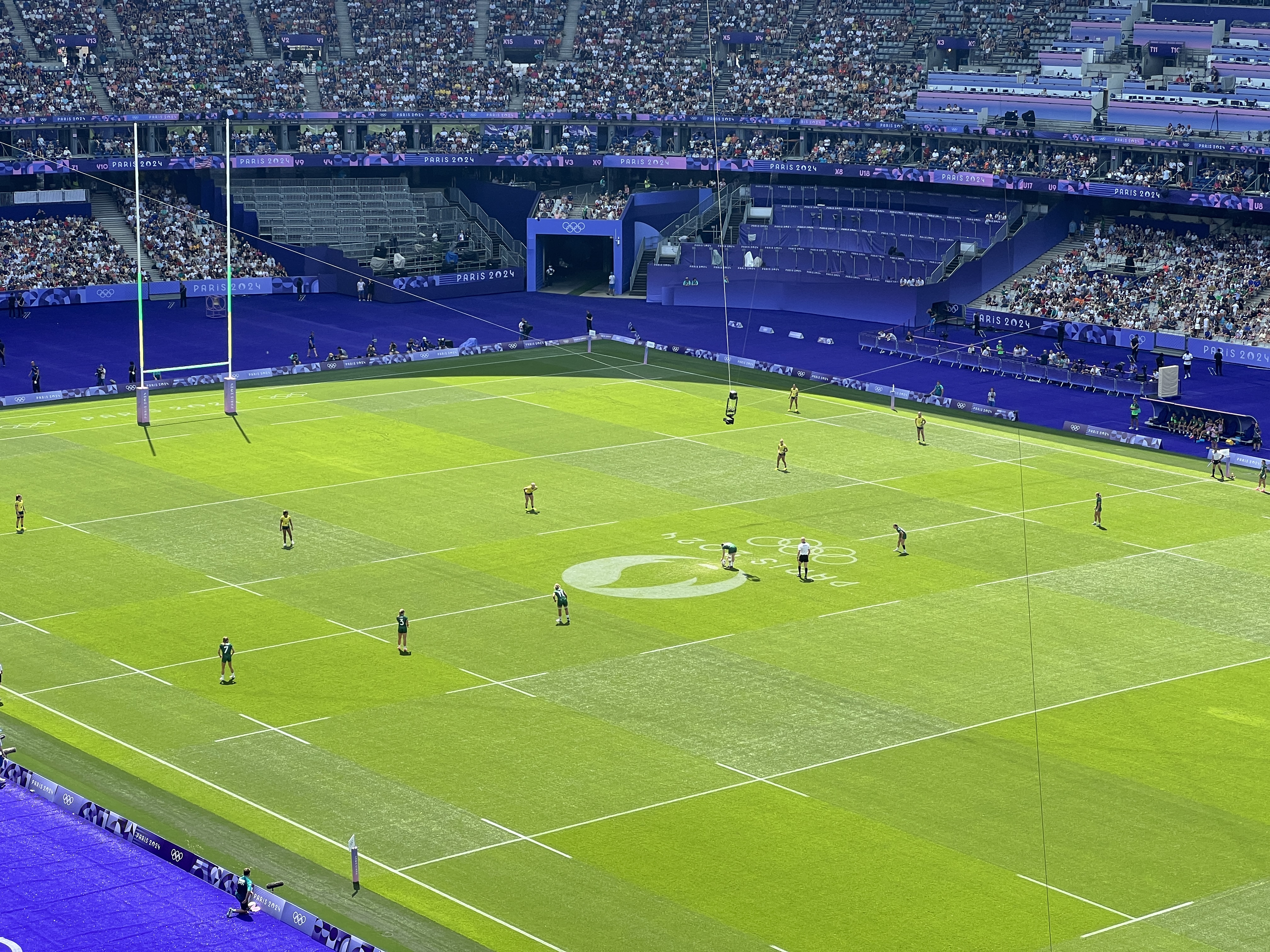
Australia vs Ireland kickoff

29 July 2024
22:30

Australia	40–7	Ireland
Try: M. Levi (3) 1' m, 4' c, 6' c Nathan 7' c Nasser 9' c Terita 14' c Con: Hinds (4/5) 4', 6', 7', 9'; Du Toit (1/1) 15'	World Rugby	Try: Flood 7' c Con: Higgins (1/1) 12'

Stade de France, Paris
Referee: Finlay Brown (Scotland/Great Britain)

==== Semi-finals ====
30 July 2024
15:30

New Zealand	24–12	United States
Try: Waaka (2) 5' c, 8' m Blyde (2) 11' c, 13' m Con: Pouri-Lane (1/1) 6'; King (1/3) 11'	World Rugby	Try: Kelter (2) 3' m Kirshe 15' c Con: Olsen (1/1) 16'

Stade de France, Paris
Referee: Craig Chan (Hong Kong)

30 July 2024
16:00

Canada	21–12	Australia
Try: Williams 8' c Hogan-Rochester 10' c Logan 13' c Con: Apps (3/3) 8', 10', 13'	World Rugby	Try: M. Levi 1' c Paki 4' m Con: Hinds (1/2) 2'

Stade de France, Paris
Referee: George Selwood (England/Great Britain)

==== Bronze medal match ====

30 July 2024
19:00

United States	14–12	Australia
Try: Kelter 6' c Sedrick 15' c Con: Kelter (1/1) 7', Sedrick (1/1) 15' c	World Rugby	Try: M. Levi (2) 2' c, 13' m Con: Hinds (1/2) 2'

Stade de France, Paris
Referee: Craig Chan (Hong Kong)

==== Gold medal match ====

30 July 2024
19:45

New Zealand	19–12	Canada
Try: Pouri-Lane 1' c Blyde 7' c Waaka 12' m Con: Pouri-Lane (1/1) 1' c Nathan-Wong (1/2) 7'	World Rugby	Try: Daniels 6' c Corrigan 7' m Con: Daniels (1/2) 6'

Stade de France, Paris
Referee: Kat Roche (United States)

== Player statistics ==
Leading scorers
Rank	Name	Matches played	Points	Tries	Conversions
1	(Australia) Maddison Levi	6	70	14	
2	(New Zealand) Michaela Blyde	6	50	10	
3	(France) Caroline Drouin	6	35	1	15/18
3	(France) Séraphine Okemba	5	35	7	
3	(South Africa) Nadine Roos	5	35	5	5/9
3	(New Zealand) Stacey Waaka	6	35	7	
7	(New Zealand) Risi Pouri-Lane	6	30	2	10/15
8	(Republic of Ireland) Eve Higgins	6	28	4	4/7
9	(France) Ian Jason	6	25	5	
9	(Japan) Marin Kajiki	5	25	5	
9	(Canada) Charity Williams	6	25	5	
12	(United Kingdom) Isla Norman-Bell	6	24	2	7/7
13	(Australia) Tia Hinds	6	22		11/19
14	(China) Chen Keyi	6	21	3	3/5
14	(United States) Alev Kelter	6	21	3	3/5
16	(Canada) Chloe Daniels	6	20	2	5/10
16	(New Zealand) Jazmin Felix-Hotham	6	20	4	
16	(United Kingdom) Jasmine Joyce	6	20	4	
16	(New Zealand) Tyla King	6	20		10/18
16	(United States) Kristi Kirshe	6	20	4	
16	(China) Liu Xiaoqian	6	20	4	
16	(Canada) Piper Logan	6	20	4	
16	(France) Yolaine Yengo	6	20	2	5/6
24	(Australia) Teagan Levi	6	19	3	2/4
25	(Republic of Ireland) Stacey Flood	6	18	2	4/4
25	(Japan) Hanako Utsumi	5	18	2	4/5
27	(Brazil) Gabriela Lima	5	17	3	1/1
27	(United States) Alex Sedrick	6	17	3	1/1
29	(Fiji) Ana Maria Naimasi	5	16	2	3/7
30	(New Zealand) Sarah Hirini	6	15	3	
30	(United States) Ilona Maher	6	15	3	
30	(New Zealand) Jorja Miller	6	15	3	
30	(Republic of Ireland) Amee-Leigh Murphy Crowe	6	15	3	
30	(Australia) Faith Nathan	6	15	3	
30	(United States) Sammy Sullivan	6	15	3	
30	(Australia) Bienne Terita	6	15	3	
37	(China) Dou Xinrong	5	12	2	1/1
37	(United Kingdom) Megan Jones	6	12	2	1/2
39	(Canada) Olivia Apps	6	10		5/5
39	(United Kingdom) Ellie Boatman	6	10	2	
39	(Fiji) Adi Vani Buleki	5	10	2	
39	(United States) Kayla Canett	6	10		5/11
39	(Brazil) Thalia Costa	5	10	2	
39	(United Kingdom) Heather Cowell	6	10	2	
39	(China) Gu Yaoyao	6	10		5/9
39	(France) Chloé Jacquet	6	10	2	
39	(South Africa) Libbie Janse van Rensburg	5	10	2	
39	(Brazil) Raquel Kochhann	5	10		5/7
39	(Fiji) Laisana Likuceva	5	10	2	
39	(Republic of Ireland) Beibhinn Parsons	4	10	2	
39	(New Zealand) Mahina Paul	4	10	2	
39	(France) Chloé Pelle	5	10	2	
39	(Brazil) Yasmim Soares	5	10	2	
39	(Japan) Emii Tanaka	5	10	2	
39	(United States) Naya Tapper	6	10	2	
39	(Japan) Honoka Tsutsumi	5	10	2	
39	(China) Wang Wanyu	5	10	2	
39	(New Zealand) Portia Woodman-Wickliffe	6	10	2	
39	(China) Yang Feifei	5	10	2	
60	(United Kingdom) Emma Uren	6	9	1	2/2
61	(Japan) Yume Hirano	5	7	1	1/6
61	(Canada) Asia Hogan-Rochester	6	7	1	1/1
61	(New Zealand) Manaia Nuku	5	7	1	1/1
64	(Republic of Ireland) Claire Boles	1	5	1	
64	(Republic of Ireland) Megan Burns	6	5	1	
64	(France) Anne-Cécile Ciofani	6	5	1	
64	(Canada) Alysha Corrigan	6	5	1	
64	(United Kingdom) Grace Crompton	4	5	1	
64	(Brazil) Thalita Costa	5	5	1	
64	(Fiji) Ilisapeci Delaiwau	5	5	1	
64	(Fiji) Verenaisi Ditavutu	5	5	1	
64	(Republic of Ireland) Vicky Elmes Kinlan	4	5	1	
64	(France) Camille Grassineau	6	5	1	
64	(France) Joanna Grisez	6	5	1	
64	(Japan) Wakaba Hara	4	5	1	
64	(China) Yu Hu	6	5	1	
64	(United Kingdom) Ellie Kildunne	6	5	1	0/1
64	(United States) Sarah Levy	3	5	1	
64	(Fiji) Kolora Lomani	4	5	1	
64	(South Africa) Ayanda Malinga	5	5	1	
64	(Japan) Rinka Matsuda	5	5	1	
64	(Japan) Sakura Mizutani	5	5	1	
64	(South Africa) Zintle Mpupha	5	5	1	
64	(Fiji) Alowesi Nakoci	5	5	1	
64	(Australia) Isabella Nasser	6	5	1	
64	(France) Carla Neisen	5	5	1	
64	(France) Lou Noel	6	5	1	
64	(Australia) Sariah Paki	6	5	1	
64	(Fiji) Maria Rokotuisiga	5	5	1	
64	(Japan) Chiaki Saegusa	5	5	1	
64	(United Kingdom) Jade Shekells	5	5	1	
64	(Canada) Florence Symonds	5	5	1	
64	(Canada) Keyara Wardley	3	5	1	
64	(Fiji) Talei Wilson	3	5	1	
64	(China) Yan Meiling	5	5	1	
97	(Republic of Ireland) Lucy Rock	2	4		2/3
97	(Japan) Arisa Nishi	5	4		2/4
97	(United States) Alena Olsen	6	4		2/2
97	(Fiji) Reapi Ulunisau	5	4		2/5
101	(Australia) Dominique du Toit	5	2		1/1
101	(United Kingdom) Lisa Thomson	6	2		1/4
