= Rugby sevens at the 2022 Commonwealth Games – Women's team rosters =

List of Women's Rugby Sevens Team in the 2022 Commonwealth Games

This article shows the rosters of all participating teams at the women's rugby sevens tournament at the 2022 Commonwealth Games in Birmingham.

== Pool A ==
=== New Zealand ===
The following team was announced as the 2022 Commonwealth Games sevens team.

Head coach: Cory Sweeney

No.	Player	Date of birth (age)
1	Michaela Blyde	29 December 1995 (aged 26)
2	Kelly Brazier	28 October 1989 (aged 32)
3	Theresa Fitzpatrick	25 February 1995 (aged 27)
4	Sarah Hirini (c)	9 December 1992 (age 29)
5	Stacey Fluhler	3 November 1995 (age 26)
6	Jazmin Hotham	2 July 2000 (age 22)
7	Shiray Kaka	26 March 1995 (age 27)
8	Tyla Nathan-Wong	1 July 1994 (age 28)
9	Risi Pouri-Lane	28 May 2000 (age 22)
10	Alena Saili	13 December 1998 (age 23)
11	Niall Williams	21 April 1988 (age 34)
12	Tenika Willison	7 December 1997 (age 24)
13	Portia Woodman	12 July 1991 (age 31)

=== Canada ===
The following team was announced as the 2022 Commonwealth Games sevens team.

Head coach: Jack Hanratty

No.	Player	Date of birth (age)
1	Olivia Apps	1 December 1998 (age 23)
2	Fancy Bermudez	27 May 2002 (aged 20)
3	Pamphinette Buisa	28 December 1996 (age 25)
4	Emma Chown	17 December 1995 (age 26)
5	Chloe Daniels	27 April 2003 (age 19)
6	Olivia De Couvreur	20 February 2000 (age 22)
7	Bianca Farella	10 April 1992 (age 30)
8	Renee Gonzalez	14 July 1998 (age 24)
9	Nakisa Levale	12 March 1997 (age 25)
10	Piper Logan	13 July 2001 (age 20)
11	Breanne Nicholas	20 February 1994 (age 28)
12	Krissy Scurfield	15 June 2003 (age 19)
13	Keyara Wardley	27 January 2000 (age 22)

=== England ===
The following team was announced as the 2022 Commonwealth Games sevens team.

Head coach: James Rodwell

No.	Player	Date of birth (age)
1	Ellie Boatman	13 May 1997 (age 25)
2	Abbie Brown (co-c)	10 April 1996 (age 26)
3	Heather Cowell	23 January 1996 (age 26)
4	Grace Crompton	30 October 2001 (age 20)
5	Merryn Doidge	2 December 2000 (age 21)
6	Megan Jones (co-c)	23 October 1996 (age 25)
7	Alicia Maude	17 May 2002 (age 20)
8	Isla Norman-Bell	21 February 2000 (age 22)
9	Celia Quansah	26 October 1995 (age 26)
10	Jade Shekells	28 September 1996 (age 25)
11	Lauren Torley	2 September 1999 (age 22)
12	Emma Uren	1 October 1997 (age 24)
13	Amy Wilson-Hardy	3 September 1991 (age 30)

=== Sri Lanka ===
The following team was announced as the 2022 Commonwealth Games sevens team.

Head coach: Saliya Kumara

No.	Player	Date of birth (age)
1	Anusha Attanayaka	27 June 1990 (age 31)
2	Kumari Dilrukshi	18 January 1993 (age 28)
3	Jeewanthi Gunawardhana	29 December 1997 (age 24)
4	Sandika Hemakumari	2 January 1990 (age 31)
5	Dilini Kanchana	18 May 1995 (age 26)
6	Charani Liyanage	5 July 1991 (age 30)
7	Shanika Madumali	4 April 1990 (age 31)
8	Kanchana Mahendran	12 January 1998 (age 23)
9	Dulani Pallikkondage	27 May 1992 (age 29)
10	Ayesha Perera	18 October 1988 (age 33)
11	Nipuni Rasanjali	28 November 1999 (age 22)
12	Anushika Samaraweera	4 July 1992 (age 29)
13	Umayangana Thathsarani	21 December 2000 (age 21)

== Pool B ==
=== Fiji ===
The following team was announced as the 2022 Commonwealth Games sevens team.

Head coach: Saiasi Fuli

No.	Player	Date of birth (age)
1	Rusila Nagasau (c)	4 August 1987 (age 34)
2	Raijieli Daveua	30 May 1992 (age 30)
3	Vani Buleki	23 October 2000 (age 21)
4	Vasiti Solikoviti	2 August 1993 (aged 28)
5	Verenaisi Ditavutu	7 September 1999 (age 22)
6	Ivamere Rokowati	15 April 2001 (age 20)
7	Lavena Cavuru	28 June 1994 (age 28)
8	Viniana Riwai	6 June 1991 (age 31)
9	Reapi Uluinisau	2 November 1994 (age 27)
10	Lavenia Tinai	7 September 1990 (age 31)
11	Ana Naimasi	21 February 1994 (age 28)
12	Sesenieli Donu	3 March 1996 (age 26)
13	Laisana Moceisawana	28 June 1998 (age 23)

=== Australia ===
The following team was announced as the 2022 Commonwealth Games sevens team.

Head coach: Tim Walsh

No.	Player	Date of birth (age)
1	Charlotte Caslick	9 March 1995 (age 27)
2	Lily Dick	26 December 1999 (age 22)
3	Dominique du Toit	19 May 1997 (age 25)
4	Demi Hayes	25 May 1998 (age 24)
5	Madison Ashby	22 January 2001 (age 21)
6	Tia Hinds	11 May 2002 (age 20)
7	Alysia Lefau-Fakaosilea	5 November 2000 (age 21)
8	Maddison Levi	27 April 2002 (age 20)
9	Teagan Levi	14 August 2003 (age 18)
10	Faith Nathan	27 July 2000 (age 22)
11	Sariah Paki	12 May 2001 (aged 21)
12	Jesse Southwell	12 February 2005 (age 17)
13	Sharni Williams	2 March 1988 (age 34)

=== Scotland ===
The following team was announced as the 2022 Commonwealth Games sevens team.

Head coach: Scott Forrest

No.	Player	Date of birth (age)
1	Rachel McLachlan	26 February 1999 (age 23)
2	Emma Orr	6 April 2003 (aged 19)
3	Megan Gaffney	3 December 1991 (age 30)
4	Eilidh Sinclair	6 July 1995 (age 27)
5	Evie Gallagher	22 August 2000 (age 21)
6	Lisa Thomson (co-c)	7 September 1997 (age 24)
7	Helen Nelson (co-c)	24 May 1994 (age 28)
8	Caity Mattinson	17 May 1996 (age 26)
9	Chloe Rollie	26 June 1995 (age 27)
10	Meryl Smith	11 June 2001 (age 21)
11	Shona Campbell	7 June 2001 (age 21)
12	Liz Musgrove	25 December 1996 (age 25)
13	Rhona Lloyd	17 October 1996 (age 25)

=== South Africa ===
The following team was announced as the 2022 Commonwealth Games sevens team.

Head coach: Paul Delport

No.	Player	Date of birth (age)
1	Donelle Snyders	8 April 2001 (age 21)
2	Felicia Jacobs	7 April 1998 (age 24)
3	Bianca Augustyn	18 March 1998 (age 24)
4	Snenhlanhla Shozi	5 May 1997 (age 25)
5	Mathrin Simmers	3 March 1988 (age 34)
6	Asisipho Plaatjies	24 April 1996 (age 26)
7	Anacadia Minnaar	4 August 2000 (age 21)
8	Unathi Mali	3 December 1989 (age 32)
9	Liske Lategan	25 November 1998 (age 23)
10	Kemisetso Baloyi	8 March 1998 (age 24)
11	Kyla de Vries	9 November 1995 (age 26)
12	Nontuthuko Shongwe	17 November 1995 (age 26)
13	Zandile Masuku	2 December 1998 (age 23)
