= Sri Lanka at the 2022 Commonwealth Games =

- Flag of Sri Lanka
- CG code: SRI
- CGA: National Olympic Committee of Sri Lanka
- Website: olympic.lk

in Birmingham, England 28 July 2022 – 8 August 2022
- Competitors: 110 (50 men and 60 women) in 13 sports
- Flag bearers: Indika Dissanayake; Chamari Athapaththu
- Medals Ranked 31st: Gold 0 Silver 1 Bronze 3 Total 4

Commonwealth Games appearances (overview)
- 1938; 1950; 1954; 1958; 1962; 1966; 1970; 1974; 1978; 1982; 1986; 1990; 1994; 1998; 2002; 2006; 2010; 2014; 2018; 2022; 2026; 2030

Sri Lanka competed at the 2022 Commonwealth Games in Birmingham, England from 28 July to 8 August 2022. This was Sri Lanka's 17th appearance at the Commonwealth Games.

On June 30, 2022 the National Olympic Committee of Sri Lanka announced a team of 114 athletes (54 men and 60 women). For the first time ever, more women will compete than men. On July 19, 2022, the table tennis team of four male athletes was withdrawn, meaning the final team size was 50 men and 60 women (110 total athletes) competing in 13 sports.

Weightlifter Indika Dissanayake and cricketer Chamari Athapaththu were the country's flagbearers during the opening ceremony.

Sri Lanka finished the competition with four medals (one silver and three bronze), ranking the country 31st overall on the medal table. Sri Lanka won its first ever Commonwealth Games medal in the sport of wrestling.

== Competitors ==
The following is the list of number of competitors participating at the Games per sport/discipline.

Sport	Men	Women	Total
3x3 basketball	4	4	8
Athletics	4	3	7
Badminton	4	2	6
Beach volleyball	2	2	4
Boxing	5	3	8
Cricket	—N/a	15	15
Diving	1	0	1
Gymnastics	3	5	8
Judo	3	2	5
Rugby sevens	13	13	26
Squash	2	2	4
Swimming	1	1	2
Weightlifting	6	4	10
Wrestling	2	4	6
Total	50	60	110

== Medalists ==
Medal	Name	Sport	Event	Date
Silver	Palitha Bandara	Athletics	Men's discus throw F44/64	August 3
Bronze	Dilanka Isuru Kumara	Weightlifting	Men's 55 kg	July 30
Bronze	Yupun Abeykoon	Athletics	Men's 100 metres	August 3
Bronze	Nethmi Poruthotage	Wrestling	Women's freestyle 57 kg	August 5

== 3x3 basketball ==
By virtue of its status as the top Commonwealth Asian nation in the respective FIBA 3x3 Federation Rankings for men and women (on 1 November 2021), Sri Lanka qualified for both tournaments.

Summary

Team	Event	Preliminary round				Quarterfinal	Semifinal	Final / BM / PM	
Team	Event	Opposition Result	Opposition Result	Opposition Result	Rank	Opposition Result	Opposition Result	Opposition Result	Rank
Sri Lanka men	Men's tournament	Scotland; L 9–16	Kenya; L 18–21	Canada; L 8–21	4	did not advance			7
Sri Lanka women	Women's tournament	Kenya; L 8–21	Scotland; L 5–21	Australia; L 2–21	4	did not advance			8

=== Men's tournament ===
Roster

- Simron Yogananthan
- Janith Chathuranga
- Supun Rukshan
- Arnold Thevakumar

Group A

Pos	Team	Pld	W	L	PF	PA	PD	Qualification
1	Scotland	3	3	0	52	43	+9	Direct to semi-finals
2	Canada	3	2	1	56	41	+15	Quarter-finals
3	Kenya	3	1	2	47	48	−1	Quarter-finals
4	Sri Lanka	3	0	3	35	58	−23	

Source: Birmingham 2022
Rules for classification: 1) Wins; 2) Head-to-head record; 3) Points scored.

29 July 2022
15:30

Report

Sri Lanka	9–16	Scotland
Pts: Yogananthan 5		Pts: Malcolm 8

Smithfield

29 July 2022
19:30

Report

Kenya	21–18	Sri Lanka
Pts: Juma 9		Pts: Yogananthan 13

Smithfield

31 July 2022
15:30

Report

Canada	21–8	Sri Lanka
Pts: Gill 8		Pts: Yogananthan 6

Smithfield

=== Women's tournament ===
Roster

- Nihari Perera
- Chalani Perera
- Fathima Morseth
- Rashmi Perera

Group A

Pos	Team	Pld	W	L	PF	PA	PD	Qualification
1	Australia	3	3	0	63	26	+37	Direct to semi-finals
2	Scotland	3	2	1	45	40	+5	Quarter-finals
3	Kenya	3	1	2	50	44	+6	Quarter-finals
4	Sri Lanka	3	0	3	15	63	−48	

Source: Birmingham 2022
Rules for classification: 1) Wins; 2) Head-to-head record; 3) Points scored.

29 July 2022
15:30

Report

Kenya	21–8	Sri Lanka
Pts: Indasi, Okot 8		Pts: N.Perera, R.Perera 3

Smithfield

29 July 2022
19:30

Report

Scotland	21–5	Sri Lanka
Pts: Leonard 8		Pts: R.Perera 3

Smithfield

31 July 2022
15:30

Report

Sri Lanka	2–21	Australia
Pts: Morseth 2		Pts: Whittle 8

Smithfield

== Athletics ==
On April 26, 2022, the Athletics Association of Sri Lanka named a team of eight athletes (four of each gender). On June 1, 2022, Hiruni Wijayaratne was dropped from the team for unknown reasons. Ushan Thiwanka later withdrew, citing a lack of preparation. Para-athlete Palitha Bandara will also compete.

On 3 August 2022, Yupun Abeykoon won the bronze medal after finishing the race in 10.14 seconds. Abeykoon also became the first Sri Lankan to win a Commonwealth Games medal in athletics after 24 years since Sriyani Kulawansa and Sugath Thilakaratne's medal feats at the 1998 Commonwealth Games. Abeykoon also became the first Sri Lankan to win a Commonwealth Games medal in either men's and women's 100m event. During the heats, Abeykoon managed to set an all-time fastest ever timing in Commonwealth Games history in the heats after finishing with a timing of 10.06 seconds. The previous record in 100m men's heats record was held by Canada's Glenroy Gilbert who had finished his heat with a timing of 10.10 seconds during the 1994 Commonwealth Games. His timing of 10.06 seconds earned him a spot in the semi-finals. Yupun finished with a timing of 10.20 seconds semi-final which helped him to secure a berth into the final and was also the only Asian athlete to qualify for the final.

Palitha Bandara claimed a silver medal in men's F42-44/61-64 discus throw final after clearing a distance of 44.20 meters garnering 944 points. Bandara became the first Sri Lankan to win a Para Sports medal for Sri Lanka in Commonwealth Games history.

Track and road events

Athlete	Event	Heat		Semifinal		Final	
Athlete	Event	Result	Rank	Result	Rank	Result	Rank
Yupun Abeykoon	Men's 100 m	10.06	1 Q	10.20	4 q	10.14	3rd place, bronze medalist(s)
Kalinga Kumarage	Men's 400 m	46.53	4 q	47.00	7	did not advance	
Gayanthika Abeyratne	Women's 800 m	2:01.20 PB	5	—N/a		did not advance	
Gayanthika Abeyratne	Women's 1500 m	4:16.97	7	—N/a		did not advance	
Nilani Ratnayake	Women's 3000 m steeplechase≤	—N/a				10:00.34	7

Field events

Athlete	Event	Qualification		Final	
Athlete	Event	Distance	Rank	Distance	Rank
Sumeda Ranasinghe	Men's javelin throw	—N/a		70.22	10
Palitha Bandara	Men's discus throw F44/64	—N/a		44.20	2nd place, silver medalist(s)
Sarangi Silva	Women's long jump	6.42	10 q	6.07	13

== Badminton ==
On May 4, 2022, Badminton Sri Lanka named a team of eight athletes (four of each gender). Sri Lanka's also qualified for the team event after being one of the top 14 nations in the BWF Ranking as of February 1, 2022. The final team announcement dropped two women, meaning the final team size was six (four men and two women).

Athlete	Event	Round of 64	Round of 32	Round of 16	Quarterfinal	Semifinal	Final / BM	
Athlete	Event	Opposition Score	Opposition Score	Opposition Score	Opposition Score	Opposition Score	Opposition Score	Rank
Dumindu Abeywickrama	Men's singles	Lubah (MRI); W 2–1 (21–7, 20–22, 21–11)	Cassar (MLT); W 2–0 (21–11, 22–20)	Kidambi (IND); L 0–2 (9–21, 12–21)	did not advance			
Niluka Karunaratne	Men's singles	Attama (UGA); W 2–0 (21–6, 21–6)	Martin (BAR); W 2–0 (21–6, 21–5)	Teh (SGP); L 0–2 (13–21, 11–21)	did not advance			
Suhasni Vidanage	Women's singles	Bye	Patel-Redfearn (ENG); L 0–2 (11–21, 14–21)	did not advance				
Sachin Dias; Buwaneka Goonethilleka	Men's doubles	—N/a	King / Martin (BAR); W 2–0 (21–12, 21–9)	Nibal / Rasheed (MDV); W 2–0 (21–12, 21–8)	Chan / Tan (MAS); L 0–2 (16–21, 12–21)	did not advance		
Sachin Dias; Thilini Hendahewa	Mixed doubles	Bye	Lindeman / Wu (CAN); W 2–0 (21–11, 21–18)	Summers / Scholtz (RSA); W 2–0 (21–18, 21–8)	Ellis / Smith (ENG); L 0–2 (12–21, 19–21)	did not advance		

Mixed team

Summary

Team	Event	Group stage				Quarterfinal	Semifinal	Final / BM	
Team	Event	Opposition Score	Opposition Score	Opposition Score	Rank	Opposition Score	Opposition Score	Opposition Score	Rank
Sri Lanka	Mixed team	Australia; W 3–2	India; L 0–5	Pakistan; W 4–1	2 Q	Malaysia; L 0–3	did not advance		

Squad

- Dumindu Abeywickrama
- Sachin Dias
- Buwaneka Goonethilleka
- Niluka Karunaratne
- Thilini Hendahewa
- Suhasni Vidanage

Group stage

Pos	Team	Pld	W	L	MF	MA	MD	GF	GA	GD	PF	PA	PD	Pts	Qualification
1	India	3	3	0	14	1	+13	28	2	+26	620	329	+291	3	Knockout stage
2	Sri Lanka	3	2	1	7	8	−1	14	16	−2	489	520	−31	2	Knockout stage
3	Australia	3	1	2	6	9	−3	12	18	−6	514	546	−32	1	
4	Pakistan	3	0	3	3	12	−9	6	24	−18	382	610	−228	0	

Source: BWF

Australia
2
National Exhibition Centre, Court 4
29 July 2022, 14:00 UTC+1

Sri Lanka
3

			1	2	3
1	(Australia) (Sri Lanka)	Yingxiang Lin / Gronya Somerville; Sachin Dias / Thilini Hendahewa	18; 21	14; 21
2	(Australia) (Sri Lanka)	Nathan Tang; Niluka Karunaratne	18; 21	12; 21
3	(Australia) (Sri Lanka)	Chen Hsuan-yu; Suhasni Vidanage	21; 10	21; 13
4	(Australia) (Sri Lanka)	Tran Hoang Pham / Jack Yu; Sachin Dias / Niluka Karunaratne	16; 21	14; 21
5	(Australia) (Sri Lanka)	Chen Hsuan-yu / Gronya Somerville; Thilini Hendahewa / Suhasni Vidanage	21; 18	21; 14

India
5
National Exhibition Centre, Court 3
30 July 2022, 09:00 UTC+1

Sri Lanka
0

			1	2	3
1	(India) (Sri Lanka)	Satwiksairaj Rankireddy / Ashwini Ponnappa; Sachin Dias / Thilini Hendahewa	21; 14	21; 9
2	(India) (Sri Lanka)	Lakshya Sen; Niluka Karunaratne	21; 18	21; 5
3	(India) (Sri Lanka)	Aakarshi Kashyap; Suhasni Vidanage	21; 3	21; 9
4	(India) (Sri Lanka)	Chirag Shetty / B. Sumeeth Reddy; Sachin Dias / Dumindu Abeywickrama	21; 10	21; 13
5	(India) (Sri Lanka)	Gayatri Gopichand / Treesa Jolly; Suhasni Vidanage / Thilini Hendahewa	21; 18	21; 6

Sri Lanka
4
National Exhibition Centre, Court 3
30 July 2022, 19:00 UTC+1

Pakistan
1

			1	2	3
1	(Sri Lanka) (Pakistan)	Sachin Dias / Thilini Hendahewa; Muhammad Irfan Saeed Bhatti / Ghazala Siddique	21; 9	21; 11
2	(Sri Lanka) (Pakistan)	Niluka Karunaratne; Murad Ali	21; 9	21; 11
3	(Sri Lanka) (Pakistan)	Suhasni Vidanage; Mahoor Shahzad	20; 22	15; 21
4	(Sri Lanka) (Pakistan)	Sachin Dias / Niluka Karunaratne; Mahoor Shahzad / Muhammad Irfan Saeed Bhatti	21; 15	21; 13
5	(Sri Lanka) (Pakistan)	Thilini Hendahewa / Suhasni Vidanage; Murad Ali / Ghazala Siddique	21; 15	21; 8

Quarterfinals

Malaysia
3
National Exhibition Centre, Court 2
31 July 2022, 11:00 UTC+1

Sri Lanka
0

			1	2	3
1	(Malaysia) (Sri Lanka)	Tan Kian Meng / Lai Pei Jing; Sachin Dias / Thilini Hendahewa	21; 14	21; 14
2	(Malaysia) (Sri Lanka)	Ng Tze Yong; Niluka Karunaratne	21; 5	21; 14
3	(Malaysia) (Sri Lanka)	Goh Jin Wei; Suhasni Vidanage	21; 9	21; 5
4	(Malaysia) (Sri Lanka)	Aaron Chia / Soh Wooi Yik; Sachin Dias / Dumindu Abeywickrama				not played
5	(Malaysia) (Sri Lanka)	Pearly Tan / Thinaah Muralitharan; Suhasni Vidanage / Thilini Hendahewa				not played

== Beach volleyball ==
On 19 March 2022, Sri Lanka qualified in both the men's and women's tournaments. This was achieved by both teams winning the Asian Qualifiers that were held in Negombo, Sri Lanka. This will be the first time Sri Lanka will be competing in the women's event. The teams were officially deemed as qualified on April 26, 2022.

Summary

Athletes	Event	Preliminary Round				Quarterfinals	Semifinals	Finals	Rank
Athletes	Event	Opposition Score	Opposition Score	Opposition Score	Rank	Opposition Score	Opposition Score	Opposition Score	Rank
Malinta Yapa; Ashen Rashmika	Men's	Dearing / Schachter (CAN); L 0–2 (13–21, 12–21)	Jawo / Jarra (GAM); L 1–2 (14-21, 21–19, 15–9)	Hodge / Seabrookes (SKN); W 2–0 (21–11, 21–11)	3 Q	Burnett / McHugh (AUS); L 1–2 (21–16, 16–21, 9–15)	did not advance		
Deepika Bandara; Chaturika Weerasinghe	Women's	Artacho / Clancy (AUS); L 0–2 (10–21, 12–21)	Konstantopoulou / Konstantinou (CYP); L 0–2 (8–21, 10–21)	Armstrong / Chase (TTO); W WO	3 Q	Humana-Paredes / Pavan (CAN); L 0–2 (9–21, 11–21)	did not advance		

=== Men's tournament ===
Group A

Pos	Team	Pld	W	L	Pts	SW	SL	SR	SPW	SPL	SPR	Qualification
1	Dearing – Schachter (CAN)	3	3	0	6	6	1	6.000	137	96	1.427	Quarterfinals
2	Jawo – Jarra (GAM)	3	2	1	5	5	3	1.667	149	118	1.263	Quarterfinals
3	Yapa – Rashmika (SRI)	3	1	2	4	3	4	0.750	111	119	0.933	Ranking of third-placed teams
4	Hodge – Seabrookes (SKN)	3	0	3	3	0	6	0.000	62	126	0.492	

Source: birmingham2022.com

31 July 2022; 14:30	Dearing – Schachter (CAN)	2–0	Yapa – Rashmika (SRI)	Smithfield
31 July 2022; 14:30	(21–13, 21–12); Report			Smithfield

2 August 2022; 19:00	Jawo – Jarra (GAM)	2–1	Yapa – Rashmika (SRI)	Smithfield
2 August 2022; 19:00	(21–14, 19–21, 15–9); Report			Smithfield

4 August 2022; 19:00	Hodge – Seabrookes (SKN)	0–2	Yapa – Rashmika (SRI)	Smithfield
4 August 2022; 19:00	(11–21, 11–21); Report			Smithfield

Quarterfinals

5 August 2022; 12:00	Yapa – Rashmika (SRI)	1–2	Burnett – McHugh (AUS)	Smithfield
5 August 2022; 12:00	(21–16, 16–21, 9–15); Report			Smithfield

=== Women's tournament ===
Group B

Pos	Team	Pld	W	L	Pts	SW	SL	SR	SPW	SPL	SPR	Qualification
1	Artacho – Clancy (AUS)	3	3	0	6	6	0	MAX	126	62	2.032	Quarterfinals
2	Konstantopoulou – Konstantinou (CYP)	3	2	1	5	4	2	2.000	111	84	1.321	Quarterfinals
3	Bandara – Weerasinghe (SRI)	3	1	2	4	2	4	0.500	40	84	0.476	Ranking of third-placed teams
4	Armstrong – Chase (TTO)	3	0	3	3	0	6	0.000	37	126	0.294	

Source: birmingham2022.com

Qualified for the Quarterfinals

31 July 2022; 14:30	Artacho – Clancy (AUS)	2–0	Bandara – Weerasinghe (SRI)	Smithfield
31 July 2022; 14:30	(21–10, 21–12); Report			Smithfield

2 August 2022; 19:00	Konstantopoulou – Konstantinou (CYP)	2–0	Bandara – Weerasinghe (SRI)	Smithfield
2 August 2022; 19:00	(21–8, 21–10); Report			Smithfield

4 August 2022; 19:00	Armstrong – Chase (TTO)	0–2	Bandara – Weerasinghe (SRI)	Smithfield
4 August 2022; 19:00	INJ; Report			Smithfield

Quarterfinals

5 August 2022; 21:00	Humana-Paredes – Pavan (CAN)	2–0	Bandara – Weerasinghe (SRI)	Smithfield
5 August 2022; 21:00	(21–9, 21–11); Report			Smithfield

== Boxing ==
Sri Lanka entered eight boxers (five men and three women).

Men

Athlete	Event	Round of 32	Round of 16	Quarterfinals	Semifinals	Final	Rank
Athlete	Event	Opposition Result	Opposition Result	Opposition Result	Opposition Result	Opposition Result	Rank
Vidanalange Bandara	51 kg	—N/a	Macdonald (ENG); L 0–5	did not advance			
Rukmal Prasanna	54 kg	—N/a	Hassan (KEN); W 3–2	Mensah (GHA); L 1–3	did not advance		
Jeewantha Nisshanka	57 kg	Bye	Allicock (GUY); L 0–5	did not advance			
Sanjeewa Bandara	63.5 kg	Tyers (ENG); L 0–5	did not advance				
Niklas Vittalis	71 kg	Bye	Ah Tong (SAM); L 0–5	did not advance			

Women

Athlete	Event	Round of 16	Quarterfinals	Semifinals	Final	Rank
Athlete	Event	Opposition Result	Opposition Result	Opposition Result	Opposition Result	Rank
Nadeeka Pushpakumari	48 kg	—N/a	Modukanele (BOT); L 0–4	did not advance		
Keshani Hansika	50 kg	Bye	McNaul (NIR); L 0–5	did not advance		
Sajeewani Coorey	57 kg	Mehreen (PAK); W 5–0	Mnguni (RSA); L RSC	did not advance		

== Cricket ==
Sri Lanka secured its place in the tournament by winning the Commonwealth Games Qualifier on 24 January 2022. The final roster of 15 athletes was named on July 19, 2022.

Summary

Team	Event	Group stage				Semifinal	Final / BM	
Team	Event	Opposition Result	Opposition Result	Opposition Result	Rank	Opposition Result	Opposition Result	Rank
Sri Lanka women	Women's tournament	England; L by 5 wickets	New Zealand; L by 45 runs	South Africa; L by 10 wickets	4	did not advance		

Roster

- Chamari Athapaththu
- Nilakshi de Silva
- Kavisha Dilhari
- Sachini Gonapinuwala
- Achini Kulasuriya
- Ama Kanchana
- Sugandika Kumari
- Hasini Perera
- Udeshika Prabodhani
- Inoka Ranaweera
- Oshadi Ranasinghe
- Anushka Sanjeewani
- Harshitha Samarawickrama
- Prasadani Weerakkody
- Imesha Witharana

Group play

Pos	Team	Pld	W	L	NR	Pts	NRR
1	England	3	3	0	0	6	1.826
2	New Zealand	3	2	1	0	4	0.068
3	South Africa	3	1	2	0	2	1.118
4	Sri Lanka	3	0	3	0	0	−2.805

Source: ESPNcricinfo

30 July 2022
18:00 (D/N)
Scorecard

Sri Lanka; 106/9 (20 overs)	v	England; 109/5 (17.1 overs)
Nilakshi de Silva 25 (28); Sophie Ecclestone 3/25 (4 overs)		Alice Capsey 44 (45); Inoka Ranaweera 3/29 (4 overs)

England won by 5 wickets
Edgbaston, Birmingham
Umpires: Eloise Sheridan (Aus) and Jacqueline Williams (WI)
Player of the match: Alice Capsey (Eng)

- Sri Lanka won the toss and elected to bat.
- Katherine Brunt (Eng) played in her 100th WT20I.

2 August 2022
18:00 (D/N)
Scorecard

New Zealand; 147/7 (20 overs)	v	Sri Lanka; 102/8 (20 overs)
Suzie Bates 34 (32); Inoka Ranaweera 3/30 (4 overs)		Nilakshi de Silva 36 (35); Hayley Jensen 3/5 (4 overs)

New Zealand won by 45 runs
Edgbaston, Birmingham
Umpires: Eloise Sheridan (Aus) and Jacqueline Williams (WI)
Player of the match: Hayley Jensen (NZ)

- New Zealand won the toss and elected to bat.

4 August 2022
11:00
Scorecard

Sri Lanka; 46 (17.1 overs)	v	South Africa; 47/0 (6.1 overs)
Chamari Athapaththu 15 (29); Nadine de Klerk 3/7 (4 overs)		Tazmin Brits 21* (21)

South Africa won by 10 wickets
Edgbaston, Birmingham
Umpires: Claire Polosak (Aus) and Jacqueline Williams (WI)
Player of the match: Nadine de Klerk (SA)

- South Africa won the toss and elected to field.

== Diving ==
Sri Lanka entered one male diver.

Men

Athlete	Events	Preliminary		Final	
Athlete	Events	Points	Rank	Points	Rank
Dulanjan Fernando	1 m springboard	188.15	11 Q	232.50	11
Dulanjan Fernando	3 m springboard	217.95	15	did not advance	

== Gymnastics ==
Sri Lanka's gymnastics team consisted of eight athletes (three men and five women).

=== Artistic ===
Sri Lanka's artistic gymnastics team consisted of seven athletes (three men and four women).

Men
Team Final & Individual Qualification

Athlete	Event	Apparatus						Total	Rank
Athlete	Event	F	PH	R	V	PB	HB	Total	Rank
Ruchira Fernando	Team	11.200	12.000	10.250	13.150	11.250	10.700	68.550	20 Q
Malin Fernando	Team	did not start							
Hansa Kumarasinghege	Team	—N/a	9.050	4.150	10.100	—N/a	—N/a	—N/a	—N/a
Total	Team	11.200	21.050	14.400	23.250	11.250	10.700	91.850	10

Individual Finals

Athlete	Event	Apparatus						Total	Rank
Athlete	Event	F	PH	R	V	PB	HB	Total	Rank
Ruchira Fernando	All-around	10.000	12.400	10.450	10.650	11.850	9.700	65.050	16

Women
Team Final & Individual Qualification

Athlete	Event	Apparatus				Total	Rank
Athlete	Event	V	UB	BB	F	Total	Rank
Milka Gehani	Team	12.800	12.000	9.770	10.650	45.200	19 Q
Kaushini Gamage	Team	11.400	7.000	~~8.000~~	7.850	34.250	29
Amaya Kalukottage	Team	11.900	7.150	8.550	8.750	36.350	27
Kumudi Abeyratne	Team	~~10.350~~	~~5.500~~	9.100	~~7.350~~	32.300	30
Total	Team	36.100	26.150	27.400	27.250	116.900	8

Individual Finals

Athlete	Event	Apparatus				Total	Rank
Athlete	Event	V	UB	BB	F	Total	Rank
Milka Gehani	All-around	DNS	10.500	10.550	DNS	DNF	

=== Rhythmic ===
Sri Lanka entered one rhythmic gymnast.

Individual Qualification

Athlete	Event	Apparatus				Total	Rank
Athlete	Event	Hoop	Ball	Clubs	Ribbon	Total	Rank
Anna-Marie Ondaatje	Qualification	23.600	21.850	23.200	21.900	90.550	22

== Judo ==
Sri Lanka entered five judoka (three men and two women).

Athlete	Event	Round of 16	Quarterfinal	Semifinal	Repechage	Final / BM	
Athlete	Event	Opposition Result	Opposition Result	Opposition Result	Opposition Result	Opposition Result	Rank
Priyankara Wimukthi	Men's 60 kg	Munro (SCO); L 00–10	did not advance				=9
Chamara Repiyallage	Men's 73 kg	Lekoko (BOT); W 10s1–00s2	Njie (GAM); L 00s1–10s1	Did not advance	Green (NIR); L 00s1–10	Did not advance	=7
Rajitha Pushpakumara	Men's 81 kg	Connolly (NZL); L 00–10	did not advance				=9
Chamila Marappulige	Women's 48 kg	Barnikel (WAL); L 00–10	did not advance				9
Hiruni Withana	Women's +78 kg	Tracy Durhone (MRI); L 00―10	did not advance				9

== Rugby sevens ==
As of 28 November 2021, Sri Lanka qualified for both the men's and women's tournaments, for a total of 26 athletes (13 per gender). This was achieved after the country was the top ranked eligible nation during the 2021 Asia Rugby Sevens Series and 2021 Asia Rugby Women's Sevens Series respectively. The women's team will be making its Commonwealth Games debut.

Summary

team	Event	Preliminary round				Quarterfinal / CQ	Semifinal / CS	Final / BM / PF	
team	Event	Opposition Result	Opposition Result	Opposition Result	Rank	Opposition Result	Opposition Result	Opposition Result	Rank
Sri Lanka men	Men's tournament	New Zealand; L 5–63	England; L 19–47	Samoa; L 0–44	4	Uganda; L 19–38	Zambia; W 27–14	Jamaica; L 24–26	14
Sri Lanka women	Women's tournament	England; L 0–57	New Zealand; L 0–60	Canada; L 0–74	4	—N/a	Scotland; L 0–58	South Africa; L 0–52	8

=== Men's tournament ===
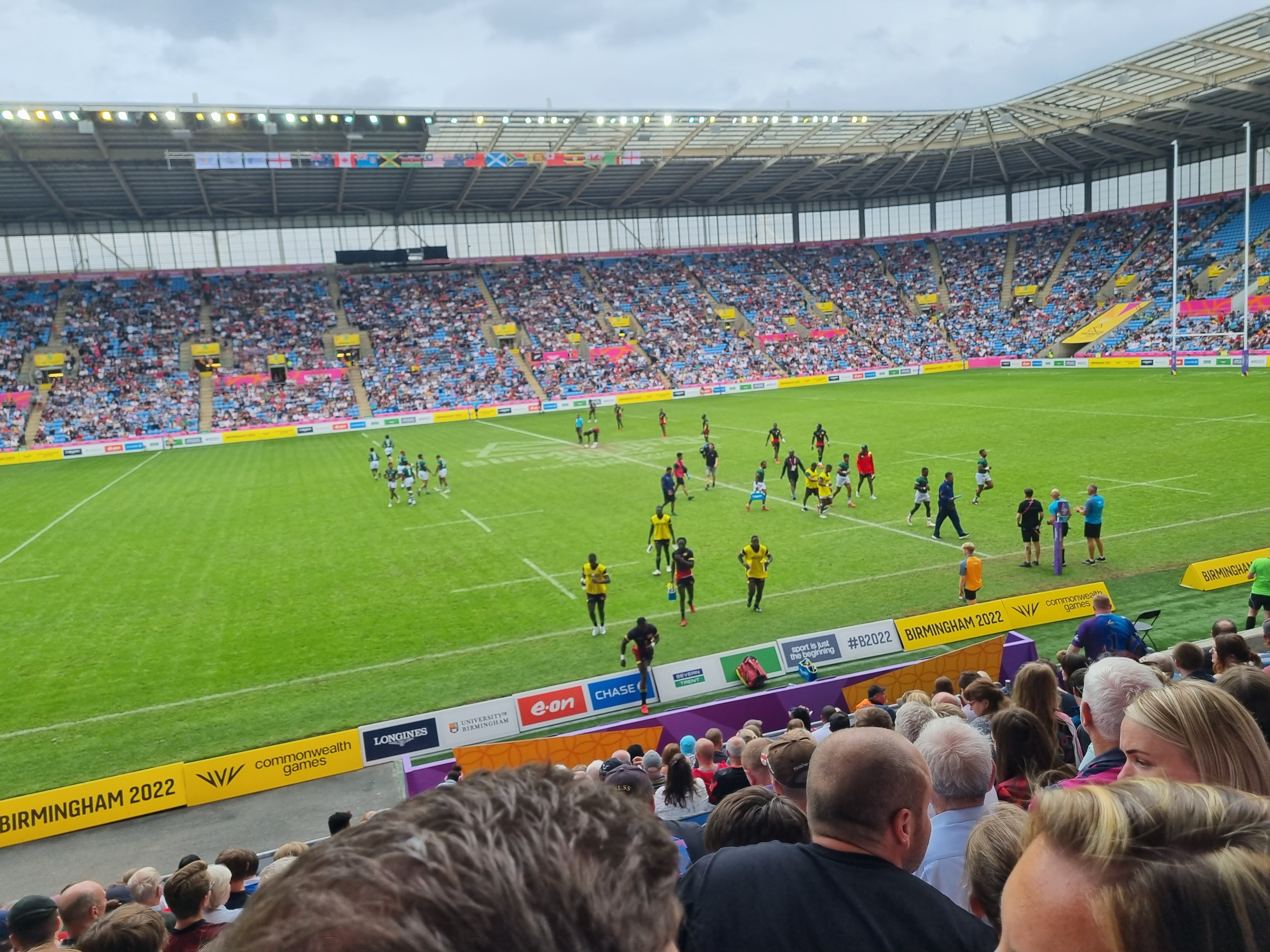
Sri Lanka's men's team faced Uganda in a placement round match.

Roster

The roster was officially named on April 25, 2022.

- Dilruksha Dange
- Sudaraka Dikkumbura
- Dansha Chandradas
- Mithun Hapugoda
- Ravindu Hettiarachchi
- Buddhima Kudachchige
- Kavindu Perera
- Reeza Raffaideen
- Nigel Ratwatte
- Ashan Ratwatte
- Chathura Senavirathne
- Srinath Sooriyabandara
- Adeesha Weerathunga

Pool A

Pos	Team	Pld	W	D	L	PF	PA	PD	Pts	Qualification
1	New Zealand	3	3	0	0	102	22	+80	9	Advance to Quarter-finals
2	Samoa	3	2	0	1	99	19	+80	7	Advance to Quarter-finals
3	England	3	1	0	2	47	77	−30	5	Advance to classification Quarter-finals
4	Sri Lanka	3	0	0	3	24	154	−130	3	Advance to classification Quarter-finals

Source: Birmingham2022
Rules for classification: 1) Points; 2) Head-to-head result; 3) Point difference; 4) Points scored.

29 July 2022
11:12

New Zealand	63–5	Sri Lanka
Try: Curry 1' c McGarvey-Black (2) 2' c, 8' c Molia (2) 4' c, 13' c Webber 5' c Collier 9' c Rokolisoa 10' c Tangitau 14' c Con: McGarvey-Black (5/5) 1', 2', 4', 6', 8'; Rokolisoa (4/4) 10', 11', 13', 14'	Report	Try: Ratwatte 6' m

Coventry Stadium, Coventry
Referee: Ben Breakspear (Wales)

29 July 2022
19:42

England	47–19	Sri Lanka
Try: Kerr (2) 1' m, 6' c Adamson (2) 4' c, 14' c Bowen 6' c Homer 8' c Emery 13' c Con: Roddick (5/6) 5', 6', 7', 9', 14'; Emery (1/1) 13'; Cards: Adamson (yellow card) 7'; Roddick (yellow card) 11'	Report	Try: Sooriyabandara 7' c A. Ratwatte 8' c Kudachchige 10' m Con: Sooriyabandara (1/2) 7'; N. Ratwatte (1/1) 8'

Coventry Stadium, Coventry
Referee: Finlay Brown (Scotland)

30 July 2022
11:12

Samoa	44–0	Sri Lanka
Try: Scanlan (4) 1' m, 4' m, 5' m, 6' m Opetai 7' c Sione 8' c Niue 10' m Onosai 14' m Con: Purcell (1/5) 9'; Leitufia (1/3) 7'	Report

Coventry Stadium, Coventry
Referee: Talal-Azmat Chaudhry (Canada)

Classification quarterfinals

30 July 2022
18:58

Uganda	38–19	Sri Lanka
Try: Wokorach 3' c Ofoyrowth 4' c Munyani 7' m Okorach (3) 9' m, 10' c, 11' c Con: Wokorach (4/6) 3', 4', 10', 12'; Cards: Munyani (yellow card) 3'	Report	Try: Kudachchige 1' c Sooriyabandara 5' c Raffaideen 14' m Con: Sooriyabandara (2/3) 2', 6'

Coventry Stadium, Coventry
Referee: Tevita Rokovereni (Fiji)

13th-16th semifinals

31 July 2022
10:52

Sri Lanka	27–14	Zambia
Try: N. Ratwatte (2) 3' m, 8' m Chandradas 7' m Kudachchige 10' m A. Ratwatte 13' c Con: N. Ratwatte (0/1); A. Ratwatte (0/1); Hapugoda (1/3) 13'	Report	Try: Mwewa 5' c Chimbukulu 12' c Con: Mukosa (1/1) 5'; Mbalwe (1/1) 12'; Cards: Bwalya (yellow card) 7'

Coventry Stadium, Coventry
Referee: Ben Breakspear (Wales)

13th place match

31 July 2022
18:44

Jamaica	26–24	Sri Lanka
Try: Caton-Brown (2) 1' c, 8' c Smith 6' m Edie 10' c Con: Roy-Smith (3/4) 1', 8', 11'	Report	Try: N. Ratwatte 3' c Hettiarachchi 7' m Kudachchige 9' c Hapugoda 14' c Con: Hapugoda (1/2) 4'; N. Ratwatte (2/2) 9', 14'

Coventry Stadium, Coventry
Referee: Finlay Brown (Scotland)

=== Women's tournament ===
Roster

The roster was officially named on April 25, 2022.

- Anusha Attanayaka
- Kumari Dilrukshi
- Jeewanthi Gunawardhana
- Sandika Hemakumari
- Dilini Kanchana
- Charani Liyanage
- Shanika Madumali
- Kanchana Mahendran
- Dulani Pallikkondage
- Ayesha Perera
- Nipuni Rasanjali
- Anushika Samaraweera
- Umayangana Thathsarani

Pool A

Pos	Team	Pld	W	D	L	PF	PA	PD	Pts	Qualification
1	New Zealand	3	3	0	0	143	14	+129	9	Semi-finals
2	Canada	3	2	0	1	107	64	+43	7	Semi-finals
3	England	3	1	0	2	83	64	+19	5	Classification semi-finals
4	Sri Lanka	3	0	0	3	0	191	−191	3	Classification semi-finals

Source: Birmingham2022
Rules for classification: 1) Points; 2) Head-to-head result; 3) Point difference; 4) Points scored.

29 July 2022
09:44

England	57–0	Sri Lanka
Try: Boatman (4) 1' c, 2' c, 4' c, 7' m Wilson-Hardy 6' c Maude (2) 8' m, 10' c Torley 12' c Crompton 14' m Con: Maude (5/7) 1', 3', 5', 6', 11'; Torley (1/1) 12'; Norman-Bell (0/1)	Report

Coventry Stadium, Coventry
Referee: Selica Winiata (New Zealand)

29 July 2022
18:14

New Zealand	60–0	Sri Lanka
Try: Fluhler (2) 1' c, 3' c Blyde (6) 2' m, 5' m, 6' c, 7' m, 10' m, 13' m Hotham 8' c Nathan-Wong 9' c Con: Nathan-Wong (5/10) 1', 3', 6', 8', 9'	Report

Coventry Stadium, Coventry
Referee: Hollie Davidson (Scotland)

30 July 2022
09:44

Canada	74–0	Sri Lanka
Try: Scurfield (5) 1' m, 3' m, 5' c, 6' m, 8' m De Couvreur (2) 4' c, 7' c Farella 8' c Levale 10' c Logan 11' m Wardley (2) 12' c, 14' c Con: Nicholas (5/8) 4', 5', 7', 9', 10'; Apps (2/3) 13', 14'	Report

Coventry Stadium, Coventry
Referee: Ashleigh Murray-Pretorius (South Africa)

Classification semifinals

30 July 2022
17:52

Scotland	58–0	Sri Lanka
Try: Lloyd (4) 1' m, 6' c, 7' c, 8' m Thomson 1' m Gaffney (2) 2' c, 10' m Campbell 4' c Sinclair 9' m Mattinson 12' m Con: Thomson (4/9) 3', 5', 6', 7'; Smith (0/1)	Report	Cards: Kanchana (yellow card) 2'

Coventry Stadium, Coventry
Referee: Holly Wood (England)

Seventh place match

31 July 2022
18:00

South Africa	52–0	Sri Lanka
Try: Jacobs (3) 1' c, 12' c, 14' m Lategan (3) 2' c, 3' m, 5' c Masuku (2) 7' c, 11' c Con: Snyders (4/5) 1', 3', 5', 7'; Shongwe (2/3) 11', 12'	Report

Coventry Stadium, Coventry
Referee: Selica Winiata (New Zealand)

== Squash ==
Sri Lanka's four member squash team (two men and two women) was named on July 3, 2022.

Singles

Athlete	Event	Round of 64	Round of 32	Round of 16	Quarterfinals	Semifinals	Final	
Athlete	Event	Opposition Score	Opposition Score	Opposition Score	Opposition Score	Opposition Score	Opposition Score	Rank
Ravindu Laksiri	Men's singles	Wiltshire (GUY); W 3–1	Lobban (SCO); L 0–3	did not advance				
Shameel Wakeel	Men's singles	Simpson (BAR); W 3–2	Ghosal (IND); L 0–3	did not advance				
Chanithma Sinaly	Women's singles	Bye	Bunyan (CAN); L 0–3	did not advance				
Yeheni Kuruppu	Women's singles	Khalil (GUY); W 3–2	Kennedy (ENG); L 0–3	did not advance				

Doubles

Athlete	Event	Round of 32	Round of 16	Quarterfinals	Semifinals	Final	
Athlete	Event	Opposition Score	Opposition Score	Opposition Score	Opposition Score	Opposition Score	Rank
Ravindu Laksiri; Shameel Wakeel	Men's doubles	Wiltshire / Khalil (GUY); W 2–0	Dowling / Pilley (AUS); L 0–2	did not advance			
Chanithma Sinaly; Yeheni Kuruppu	Women's doubles	Kuruvilla / Singh (IND); L 0–2	did not advance				
Shameel Wakeel; Chanithma Sinaly	Mixed doubles	Zafar / Iqbal (PAK); L 0–2	did not advance				
Ravindu Laksiri; Yeheni Kuruppu	Mixed doubles	Chinappa / Sandhu (IND); L 1–2	did not advance				

== Swimming ==
Sri Lanka entered two swimmers (one per gender).

Athlete	Event	Heat		Semifinal		Final	
Athlete	Event	Time	Rank	Time	Rank	Time	Rank
Akalanka Peiris	Men's 50 m backstroke	26.15	21	did not advance			
Akalanka Peiris	Men's 50 m butterfly	24.89	22	did not advance			
Ganga Senavirathne	Women's 100 m backstroke	1:06.17	20	did not advance			
Ganga Senavirathne	Women's 200 m backstroke	2:26.63	10	—N/a		did not advance	

== Weightlifting ==
At the conclusion of the rankings period on February 28, 2022, Sri Lanka qualified ten weightlifters (six men and four women). Arshika Vijaybaskar later received a reallocated quota spot, increasing the team to 11 athletes (six men and five women). However, Vijaybaskar was not on the final team list.

Men

Athlete	Event	Snatch (kg)		Clean & Jerk (kg)		Total (kg)	Rank
Athlete	Event	Result	Rank	Result	Rank	Total (kg)	Rank
Dilanka Isuru Kumara	55 kg	105	3	120	3	225	3rd place, bronze medalist(s)
Thilanka Palangasinghe	61 kg	100	6	DNS		DNF	
Chaturanga Lakmal	67 kg	119	4	140	6	259	5
Indika Dissanayake	73 kg	133	4	NM		DNF	
Chinthana Vidanage	81 kg	127	9	155	10	282	9
Ushan Charuka	+109 kg	138	9	175	8	313	8

Women

Athlete	Event	Snatch (kg)		Clean & Jerk (kg)		Total (kg)	Rank
Athlete	Event	Result	Rank	Result	Rank	Total (kg)	Rank
Srimali Samarakoon	49 kg	65	8	87	7	152	8
Chamari Warnakulasuriya	55 kg	70	8	94	6	164	7
Chathurika Priyanthi	87 kg	81	7	111	6	192	7
Trimalee Haputenne	+87 kg	89	7	110	8	199	8

== Wrestling ==
On April 11, 2022, the Wrestling Federation of Sri Lanka selected six wrestlers (two men and four women) to compete at the games. A sixth wrestler, Shanith Chathuranga, scheduled to compete in the 74 kg, left the athletes village, and was believed to have fled. Nethmi Poruthotage won a bronze medal in the Women's 57 kg event, marking the country's first ever medal in the sport of wrestling and becoming the youngest ever Sri Lankan medalist at the Commonwealth Games.

Freestyle

Athlete	Event	Round of 16	Quarterfinal	Semifinal	Repechage	Final / BM	
Athlete	Event	Opposition Result	Opposition Result	Opposition Result	Opposition Result	Opposition Result	Rank
Suresh Fernando	Men's 86 kg	Marianne (MRI); W 2–0 (VFA)	Moore (CAN); L 0–10 (VSU)	did not advance			8
Nethmi Poruthotage	Women's 57 kg	Bye	Essombe (CMR); W (VFO)	Malik (IND); L 0–10 (VSU)	—N/a	Symeonidis (AUS); W 10–0 (VSU)	3rd place, bronze medalist(s)
Sachini Weraduwage	Women's 62 kg	—N/a	Kolawole (NGR); L 0–10 (VSU)	did not advance			7

Athlete	Event	Group Stage			Semifinal	Final / BM	
Athlete	Event	Opposition Result	Opposition Result	Rank	Opposition Result	Opposition Result	Rank
Shriyanthika Sinhala Pedi	50 kg	Genesis (NGR); L 1–12 (VSU1)	Parks (CAN); L 0–12 (VSU)	3	did not advance		5

Athlete	Event	Nordic Round Robin				Rank
Athlete	Event	Opposition Result	Opposition Result	Opposition Result	Record W/L	Rank
Chamodya Maduravalage Don	53 kg	Phogat (IND); L 0–4 (VFA)	Stewart (CAN); L 2–12 (VSU1)	Adekuoroye (NGR); L 0–10 (VSU)	0–3	4

== Concerns and controversies ==
Sri Lanka's participation at the Games happened while the country was facing the worst economic crisis since its independence. In training for the event, the athletes in the contingent endured long walks to sporting facilities in their home country, as a fuel shortage made it impossible for them to drive. The team was planning on sending a large amount of delegates, which raised concerns of it being financially unviable for them. Sri Lanka Cricket stepped in by spending 20 million Sri Lankan rupees on the contingent's travel expenses. The National Olympic Committee of Sri Lanka announced they would have two employees monitoring the Games' athlete's village for looting or disappearances.

During the Games, eleven members of the contingent disappeared, most of them last seen at the Games' athlete's village. The incident is one of numerous disappearances of Sri Lankans at overseas sporting events. Three of the missing were soon found by police, but where they went afterwards was not reported. In November 2022, the police ended their investigation into the disappearances, as well as other countries' delegates who went missing during the Games, stating: "Those reported missing were either found, or the investigation closed because they were no longer believed to be missing." An update on any of their whereabouts was not given. As with the other Sri Lankan sporting disappearances, investigators suspect the missing had used the pretense of sporting to legally enter foreign nations so they can illegally stay there.

== See also ==
- Sri Lanka at the 2022 World Athletics Championships
