= Rugby sevens at the 2022 Commonwealth Games – Women's tournament =

2022 Women's Commonwealth Rugby Sevens Tournament
Tournament details
- Host: England
- Venue: Coventry Stadium, Coventry
- Date: 29–31 July 2022

Final positions
- Champions: Australia (1st title)
- Runner-up: Fiji
- Third place: New Zealand
- Fourth place: Canada

The rugby sevens at the 2022 Commonwealth Games – Women's tournament was the women's event of the Commonwealth Games rugby sevens competition held every four years. It was held at the Coventry Stadium from 29 to 31 July 2022.

== Venue ==
The rugby sevens tournaments were originally scheduled to take place at Villa Park, but they instead took place at the Coventry Stadium in Coventry.

The adjacent Coventry Arena was used for judo and wrestling.

== Qualification ==
England qualified as host nation, three nations qualified via the World Rugby Women's Sevens Series, and four nations booked their places in regional qualification tournaments.

Means of qualification	Date	Location	Quotas	Qualified
Host Nation	—N/a	—N/a	1	England
2018–19 & 2019–20; World Rugby Women's Sevens Series	20 October 2018 – 16 June 2019; 5 October 2019 – 2 February 2020	Various	3	New Zealand; Canada; Australia
North America allocation	20 October 2018 – 16 June 2019; 5 October 2019 – 2 February 2020	Various	0 (Note: Canada qualified in the top two outright and were the only RAN Commonwealth nation with ranking points, so the RAN-specific quota place was reallocated to the general standings.)	—
2019 Oceania Women's Sevens (Note: A women's qualification tournament scheduled for April 2022 was abandoned owing to COVID-19-related logistical challenges, so the (pre-pandemic) 2019 championship was designated as the Oceania qualifier.)	7–9 November 2019	(Fiji) Suva	1	Fiji
2021 Europe Women's Sevens (Moscow round)	25–26 June 2021	(Russia) Moscow	1	Scotland
2021 Asia Women's Sevens	19–20 November 2021	(United Arab Emirates) Dubai	1	Sri Lanka
2022 Africa Women's Sevens	29–30 April 2022	(Tunisia) Jemmal	1	South Africa
Total			8	

== Competition format ==
In July 2022, eight teams were drawn into two groups; the top two performing teams in each group advanced to the semi-finals, whilst the remaining teams were sent to lower classification matches to determine their final ranking.

== Officials ==
A total of 6 Referees, 3 Assistants and 3 Television Match Officials (TMOs) were selected for the tournament.

Referee	Assistants	Television Match Officials
Hollie Davidson (Scotland)	Talal-Azmat Chaudhry (Canada)	Claire Daniels (England)
Lauren Jenner (New Zealand)	Leonie Pryor (England)	Craig Joubert (South Africa)
Tyler Miller (Australia)	Rebecca Rees (England)	Paddy O'Brien (New Zealand)
Ashley Murray-Pretorious (South Africa)
Selica Winiata (New Zealand)
Holly Wood (England)

== Pool stage ==
=== Pool A ===
Pos	Team	Pld	W	D	L	PF	PA	PD	Pts	Qualification
1	New Zealand	3	3	0	0	143	14	+129	9	Semi-finals
2	Canada	3	2	0	1	107	64	+43	7	Semi-finals
3	England	3	1	0	2	83	64	+19	5	Classification semi-finals
4	Sri Lanka	3	0	0	3	0	191	−191	3	Classification semi-finals

Source: Birmingham2022
Rules for classification: 1) Points; 2) Head-to-head result; 3) Point difference; 4) Points scored.

29 July 2022
09:44

England	57–0	Sri Lanka
Try: Boatman (4) 1' c, 2' c, 4' c, 7' m Wilson-Hardy 6' c Maude (2) 8' m, 10' c Torley 12' c Crompton 14' m Con: Maude (5/7) 1', 3', 5', 6', 11'; Torley (1/1) 12'; Norman-Bell (0/1)	Report

Coventry Stadium, Coventry
Referee: Selica Winiata (New Zealand)

29 July 2022
10:06

New Zealand	45–7	Canada
Try: Woodman 2' c Blyde (2) 4' m, 8' c Fluhler 7' m Brazier 11' c Pouri-Lane 12' c Saili 14' c Con: Nathan-Wong (2/4) 3', 8'; Pouri-Lane (3/3) 11', 13', 14'	Report	Try: Daniels 10' c Con: Apps (1/1) 10'; Cards: Gonzalez (yellow card) 2'

Coventry Stadium, Coventry
Referee: Tyler Miller (Australia)

29 July 2022
18:14

New Zealand	60–0	Sri Lanka
Try: Fluhler (2) 1' c, 3' c Blyde (6) 2' m, 5' m, 6' c, 7' m, 10' m, 13' m Hotham 8' c Nathan-Wong 9' c Con: Nathan-Wong (5/10) 1', 3', 6', 8', 9'	Report

Coventry Stadium, Coventry
Referee: Hollie Davidson (Scotland)

29 July 2022
18:36

Canada	26–19	England
Try: Wardley 5' c Farella (2) 7', 8' c Scurfield 9' c Con: Apps (3/4) 5', 9', 10'	Report	Try: Boatman 1' m Crompton 11' c Cowell 14' c Con: Jones (1/2) 14'; Norman-Bell (1/1) 12'; Cards: Boatman (yellow card) 8'

Coventry Stadium, Coventry
Referee: Lauren Jenner (New Zealand)

30 July 2022
09:44

Canada	74–0	Sri Lanka
Try: Scurfield (5) 1' m, 3' m, 5' c, 6' m, 8' m De Couvreur (2) 4' c, 7' c Farella 8' c Levale 10' c Logan 11' m Wardley (2) 12' c, 14' c Con: Nicholas (5/8) 4', 5', 7', 9', 10'; Apps (2/3) 13', 14'	Report

Coventry Stadium, Coventry
Referee: Ashleigh Murray-Pretorius (South Africa)

30 July 2022
10:06

New Zealand	38–7	England
Try: Blyde (2) 3' c, 6' c Hirini 4' c Kaka 10' m Hotham 12' c Pouri-Lane 14' m Con: Nathan-Wong (3/3) 3', 5', 7'; Pouri-Lane (1/3) 13'	Report	Try: Boatman 7' c Con: Norman-Bell (1/1) 7'

Coventry Stadium, Coventry
Referee: Hollie Davidson (Scotland)

=== Pool B ===
Pos	Team	Pld	W	D	L	PF	PA	PD	Pts	Qualification
1	Fiji	3	3	0	0	91	24	+67	9	Semi-finals
2	Australia	3	2	0	1	100	19	+81	7	Semi-finals
3	Scotland	3	1	0	2	45	93	−48	5	Classification semi-finals
4	South Africa	3	0	0	3	12	112	−100	3	Classification semi-finals

Updated to match(es) played on 29 July 2022. Source: Birmingham2022
Rules for classification: 1) Points; 2) Head-to-head result; 3) Point difference; 4) Points scored.

29 July 2022
09:00

Australia	38–0	South Africa
Try: Levi (2) 1' c, 6' c Nathan 2' m Caslick (2) 4' c, 8' c Ashby 14' m Con: Hinds (3/4) 1', 5', 6'; Williams (0/1)	Report

Coventry Stadium, Coventry
Referee: Hollie Davidson (Scotland)

29 July 2022
09:22

Fiji	31–12	Scotland
Try: Uluinisau 3' c Buleki 7' c Cavuru 8' c Donu 12' m Riwai 14' m Con: Cavuru (2/2) 3', 8'; Naimasi (1/2) 9'; Uluinisau (0/1)	Report	Try: Campbell 5' m Lloyd 10' c Con: Thomson (0/1); Nelson (1/1) 11'

Coventry Stadium, Coventry
Referee: Ashleigh Murray-Pretorius (South Africa)

29 July 2022
17:30

Fiji	41–0	South Africa
Try: Uluinisau (2) 2' c, 11' c Buleki 3' m Naimasi 6' c Donu (2) 8' m, 9' m Cavuru 13' m Con: Naimasi (2/4) 2', 7'; Riwai (0/1); Uluinisau (1/1) 11'; Cavuru (0/1)	Report

Coventry Stadium, Coventry
Referee: Tyler Miller (Australia)

29 July 2022
17:52

Australia	50–0	Scotland
Try: Levi (3) 1' c, 7' c, 9' m Paki (2) 3' c, 10' m Williams 6' c Nathan 8' m Southwell 13' c Con: Hinds (2/2) 2', 4'; Williams (2/5) 7', 7'; Southwell (1/1) 13'	Report

Coventry Stadium, Coventry
Referee: Selica Winiata (New Zealand)

30 July 2022
09:00

Scotland	33–12	South Africa
Try: Lloyd (3) 2' c, 4' m, 13' c McLachlan 3' c Orr 7' c Con: Thomson (3/4) 3', 4', 7'; Smith (1/1) 14'	Report	Try: Lategan 1' m Snyders 10' c Con: Shongwe (0/1); Snyders (1/1) 10'; Cards: Masuku (yellow card) 12'

Coventry Stadium, Coventry
Referee: Tyler Miller (Australia)

30 July 2022
09:22

Australia	12–19	Fiji
Try: Levi 12' m Hayes 13' c Con: Williams (0/1); Southwell (1/1) 14'	Report	Try: Nagasau 1' m Donu 3' c Daveua 9' c Con: Naimasi (0/1); Riwai (2/2) 4', 9'; Cards: Uluinisau (yellow card) 13'

Coventry Stadium, Coventry
Referee: Lauren Jenner (New Zealand)

== Medal round ==
Semi-finals
30 July – Coventry Stadium
New Zealand	12
Australia	17
30 July – Coventry Stadium
Fiji	24
Canada	7

Gold medal match
31 July – Coventry Stadium
Australia	22
Fiji	12
Bronze medal match
31 July – Coventry Stadium
New Zealand	19
Canada	12

=== Semi-finals ===
30 July 2022
19:42

New Zealand	12–17	Australia
Try: Woodman 4' m Fitzpatrick 6' c Con: Nathan-Wong (1/2) 7'	Report	Try: Levi (3) 1' m, 9' m, 12' c Con: Williams (0/2); Du Toit (1/1) 12'; Cards: Levi (yellow card) 14'

Coventry Stadium, Coventry
Referee: Hollie Davidson (Scotland)

30 July 2022
20:04

Fiji	24–7	Canada
Try: Buleki 1' c Uluinisau (2) 2' m, 12' c Riwai 3' m Con: Uluinisau (1/1) 1'; Naimasi (0/2); Cavuru (1/1) 12'	Report	Try: Nicholas 7' c Con: Apps (1/1) 7'

Coventry Stadium, Coventry
Referee: Lauren Jenner (New Zealand)

=== Bronze medal match ===
31 July 2022
19:50

New Zealand	19–12	Canada
Try: Blyde 1' m Brazier 4' c Saili 11' c Con: Nathan-Wong (1/2) 5'; Pouri-Lane (1/1) 11'	Report	Try: Logan 12' c Chown 14' m Con: Apps (1/2) 13'; Cards: Scurfield (yellow card) 1'

Coventry Stadium, Coventry
Referee: Tyler Miller (Australia)

=== Gold medal match ===
31 July 2022
20:38

Australia	22–12	Fiji
Try: Nathan (2) 1' m, 3' m Ashby 6' c Levi 8' m Con: Williams (1/4) 6'; Cards: Caslick (yellow card) 13'	Report	Try: Naimasi 9' c Donu 14' m Con: Naimasi (1/1) 9'; Cavuru (0/1)

Coventry Stadium, Coventry
Referee: Hollie Davidson (Scotland)

== Classification matches ==
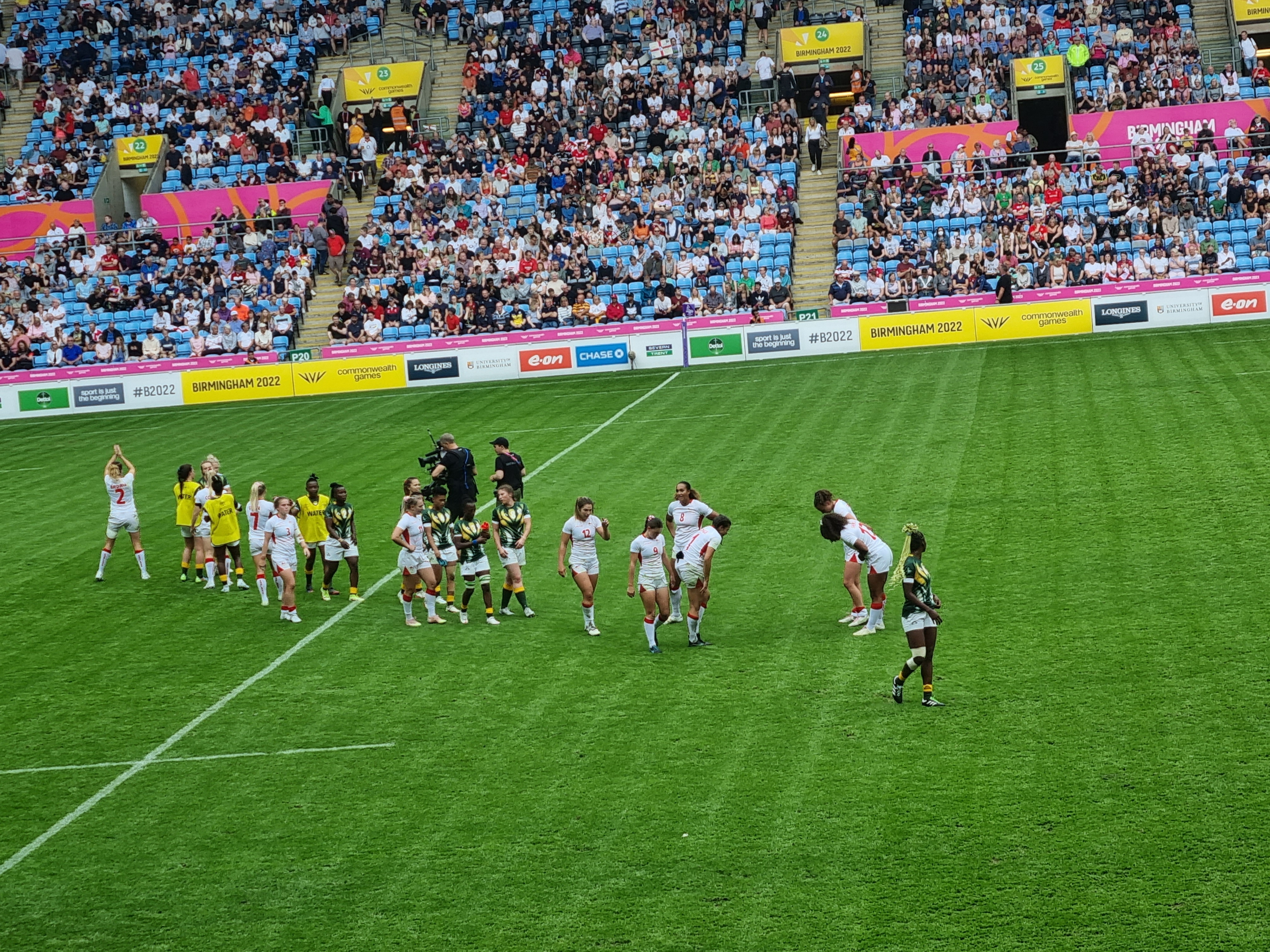
England vs South Africa

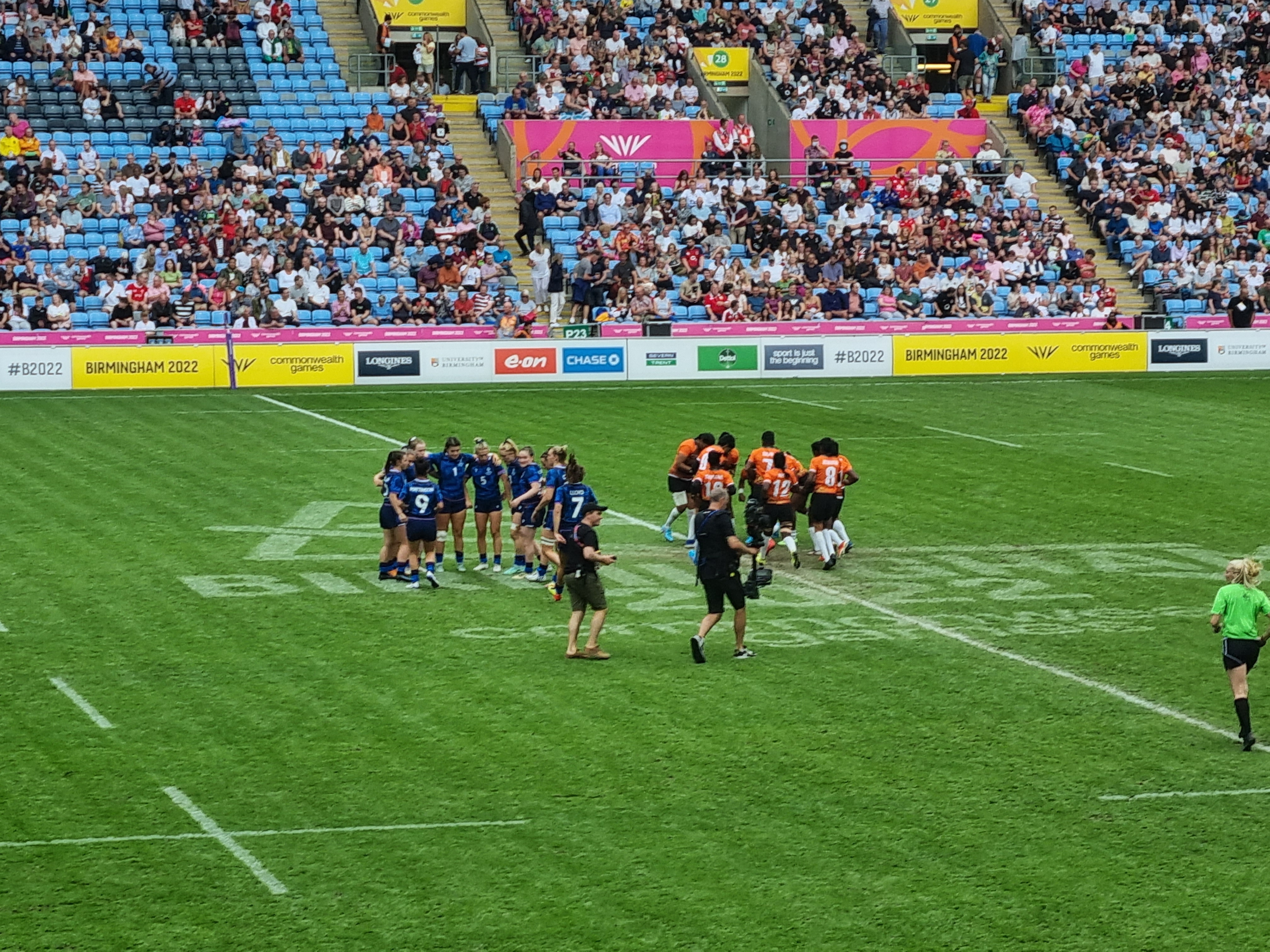
Scotland vs Sri Lanka

Classification semi-finals
30 July – Coventry Stadium
England	36
South Africa	0
30 July – Coventry Stadium
Scotland	58
Sri Lanka	0

Fifth place match
31 July – Coventry Stadium
England	29
Scotland	5
Seventh place match
31 July – Coventry Stadium
South Africa	52
Sri Lanka	0

=== Classification semi-finals ===
30 July 2022
17:30

England	36–0	South Africa
Try: Cowell 2' c Uren 3' m Doidge 8' m Norman-Bell (2) 11' c, 12' m Wilson-Hardy 14' c Con: Maude (1/3) 2'; Norman-Bell (2/3) 11', 14'	Report

Coventry Stadium, Coventry
Referee: Selica Winiata (New Zealand)

30 July 2022
17:52

Scotland	58–0	Sri Lanka
Try: Lloyd (4) 1' m, 6' c, 7' c, 8' m Thomson 1' m Gaffney (2) 2' c, 10' m Campbell 4' c Sinclair 9' m Mattinson 12' m Con: Thomson (4/9) 3', 5', 6', 7'; Smith (0/1)	Report	Cards: Kanchana (yellow card) 2'

Coventry Stadium, Coventry
Referee: Holly Wood (England)

=== Seventh place match ===
31 July 2022
18:00

South Africa	52–0	Sri Lanka
Try: Jacobs (3) 1' c, 12' c, 14' m Lategan (3) 2' c, 3' m, 5' c Masuku (2) 7' c, 11' c Con: Snyders (4/5) 1', 3', 5', 7'; Shongwe (2/3) 11', 12'	Report

Coventry Stadium, Coventry
Referee: Selica Winiata (New Zealand)

=== Fifth place match ===
31 July 2022
18:22

England	29–5	Scotland
Try: Quansah 2' c Boatman 8' m Crompton (2) 10' m, 14' m Jones 12' c Con: Norman-Bell (1/2) 2'; Jones (1/3) 13'	Report	Con: Rollie 8' m Cards: Thomson (0/1)

Coventry Stadium, Coventry
Referee: Ashleigh Murray-Pretorius (South Africa)

== Final standing ==
Rank	Team
1st place, gold medalist(s)	Australia
2nd place, silver medalist(s)	Fiji
3rd place, bronze medalist(s)	New Zealand
4	Canada
5	England
6	Scotland
7	South Africa
8	Sri Lanka

== Player statistics ==
=== Most points ===
Pos	Name	Team	Pts
1	Michaela Blyde	New Zealand	55
2	Maddison Levi	Australia	50
3	Rhona Lloyd	Scotland	40
4	Ellie Boatman	England	35
5	Krissy Scurfield	Canada	30
6	Tyla Nathan-Wong	New Zealand	29
6	Reapi Uluinisau	Fiji	29
8	Sesenieli Donu	Fiji	25
9	Alicia Maude	England	22
9	Isla Norman-Bell	England	22

=== Most tries ===
Pos	Name	Team	Tries
1	Michaela Blyde	New Zealand	11
2	Maddison Levi	Australia	10
3	Rhona Lloyd	Scotland	8
4	Ellie Boatman	England	7
5	Krissy Scurfield	Canada	6
6	Reapi Uluinisau	Fiji	5
6	Sesenieli Donu	Fiji	5
8	Grace Crompton	England	4
8	Liske Lategan	South Africa	4
8	Faith Nathan	Australia	4

== See also ==
- Rugby sevens at the 2022 Commonwealth Games – Men's tournament
