= Jazmin Hotham =

- Born: 2 July 2000 (age 26)
- Height: 1.69 m (5 ft 7 in)
- Weight: 67 kg (148 lb)
- Notable relative(s): Noah Hotham (brother); Nigel HBHS 1st XV coach (father) Legin NZ Touch Rugby (brother)

Rugby union career
- Position: Centre
Provincial / State sides
Years	Team	Apps	(Points)
	Waikato		(0)
National sevens team
Years	Team		Comps
2020–	New Zealand		127 apps
Medal record
Representing New Zealand
Women's rugby sevens
Olympic Games
Gold medal – first place	2024 Paris	Team competition
Rugby World Cup Sevens
Silver medal – second place	2022 Cape Town	Team competition
Commonwealth Games
Bronze medal – third place	2022 Birmingham	Team competition

Jazmin Felix-Hotham (born 2 July 2000) is a New Zealand rugby sevens player. She plays for the Black Ferns Sevens and represents Waikato provincially. Felix-Hotham was a member of the New Zealand Women's Sevens team when they won a gold medal at the 2024 Summer Olympics in Paris.

== Early life ==
Felix-Hotham was born on 2 July 2000 in Henderson, Auckland, to teachers Diane and Nigel Hotham. Nigel played representative touch for New Zealand, while Diane had played at the same level for Samoa. She has four siblings, a sister and three brothers. Her older brother Legin Hotham represented New Zealand in touch rugby, while her younger brother Noah Hotham has been an All Black. In partnership with Greg Kirkham, Nigel Hotham coached the Hamilton Boys’ High School 1st XV to six National Top Four and four Sanix World Youth titles. In addition Hotham coached teams to 13 National Secondary Schools touch and nine National Condor Sevens titles. In 2025 he commenced a two year sabbatical from teaching to coach the USRC Tigers in Hong Kong's Senior Men's Club competition.

She grew up in Hamilton. Her father remembers that “When Jaz was a little girl, she had two dreams. One was to go to the Olympics; the other was to go to Paris." She played a wide range of sports of which the principal ones were athletics, football, swimming and touch rugby. Her whole family participated together in a mixed touch rugby team. With her brothers she played backyard rugby. She also played rugby at primary school, the only girl in what was an all boy team. Felix-Hotham recalled that, “When I was a little girl, I wanted to be an Olympic sprinter but I figured out pretty quickly I wasn’t fast enough.”

Following primary school she attended Hamilton Girls' High School. New Zealand sevens players Shiray Kaka, Manaia Nuku, Terina Te Tamaki, Kelsey Teneti, and Tenika Willison have also attended the same school.

When she was in Year 10 she was asked to try out for the school's rugby sevens team that was intending to travel to Japan. She applied herself to learning the game and found that she loved it, specially as it provided her with the opportunity to travel to another country.

She was 16 when she watched her mathematics teacher Shakira Baker on TV and several former Hamilton Girls High students she had played touch with, serve in the New Zealand team that competed at the 2016 Olympics. She credits it with creating a desire within her to represent her country for rugby sevens at an Olympic Games. Her high school touch rugby coach, teacher Hollie Graham also advised her that touch rugby offered no career pathway and encouraged her to instead transfer to rugby sevens as it offered the opportunity of a full-time professional career with the ability to attend Commonwealth and Olympic games.

== Rugby career ==
=== 2016–2018 ===
Despite being named MVP at the 2016 Condors Tournament and scoring a try in the final against St Marys, Felix-Hotham was unable to prevent Hamilton Girls' High School losing the final, 19-17. In December 2016 alongside Ayesha Leti-liga and Alena Saili she was a member of the New Zealand Condors team that defeated New Zealand Wasps 22-7, Samoa: 34-0 and Australia: 19-5 in group play and then against the New Zealand Wasps 19-12 in the final to win the inaugural World School Sevens (now called the Global Youth Sevens). She scored a try in every game of the tournament

In 2017, she helped her school win the National Condors title. This followed this up by being selected for the New Zealand U17 Girls Sevens team alongside Dhys Faleafaga, Mahina Paul and Risi Pouri-Lane that competed in the World Schools Sevens tournament on 16 December 2017 in Auckland, alongside the New Zealand U18 team. The U17 team made the final against Australia in which she scored two tries, the second famously giving the team a last gasp 20-19 win. Among those playing in the Australian team were Madison Ashby, Courtney Hodder, Faith Nathan and Sariah Paki.

Her performances in 2017 was sufficient for Felix-Hotham while still attending high school where she was deputy girl to be given a development contract with the Black Ferns Sevens team.

Hotham was initially chosen to captain the New Zealand girls’ sevens team to the 2018 Youth Olympics, but was ruled out due to a shoulder injury she received while playing representative rugby.

=== 2020–2021 ===
Hotham made her international debut for the Black Ferns sevens in the semi-final against France at the 2020 Sydney Women's Sevens. She was named as a travelling reserve for the 2021 Olympics squad in Tokyo.

=== 2022 ===
Hotham was named in the Black Ferns squad for the 2022 Sevens Series. She made the Black Ferns Sevens squad for the 2022 Commonwealth Games in Birmingham. She won a bronze medal at the event. She later won a silver medal at the Rugby World Cup Sevens in Cape Town.

=== 2024 Paris Olympics ===
On 20 June 2024 it was announced that she had been selected as a member of the New Zealand Women’s Rugby Sevens team for the Paris Olympics. Felix-Hotham scored four tries over the course of the Olympic sevens competition and won a gold medal after the New Zealand team triumphed against Canada in the final, 19-12.

After the Olympics she had a six week long holiday in Europe.

=== 2024-2025 Sevens Series ===
She was a member of the New Zealand team that dominated the 2024-2025 sevens season, winning 35 out of 37 games to win both the league and World Championship titles. The season saw her score her 50th try in the Sevens competition. Following the end of the international sevens season she spent from June to September playing for the Sapparo based Hokkaido Barbarians Diana rugby team in Japan's Taiyo Seimei Women’s 7s Series. Fellow New Zealanders Claudia Broomfield and Danii Mafoe were also in the team. Other New Zealanders who have previously played for the club include Renee Holmes, Cheyelle Robins-Reti, Kendra Reynolds, Kennedy Simon, Stacey Waaka and Tenika Willison.

== Personal life ==
Felix-Hotham is of Samoan and Fijian descent.
