= Kemisetso Baloyi =

South African rugby sevens player

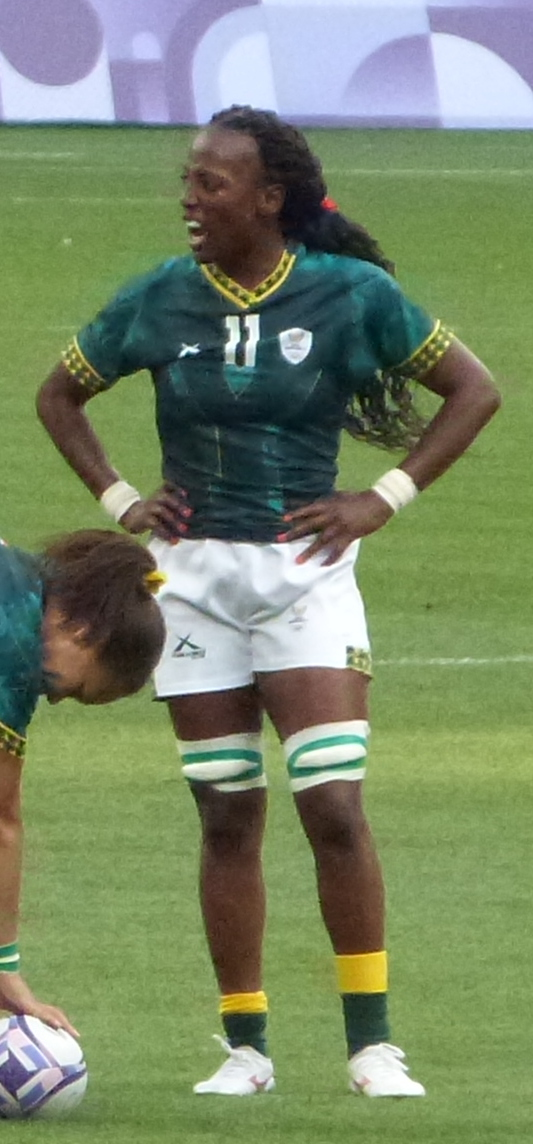
- Born: 8 March 1998 (age 28)
- Height: 159 cm (5 ft 3 in)
- Weight: 59 kg (130 lb; 9 st 4 lb)

Rugby union career
National sevens team
Years	Team	Comps
2022–	South Africa 7s	

Kemisetso Baloyi (born 8 March 1998) is a South African rugby sevens player.

== Rugby career ==
Baloyi has been playing rugby since she was 15. In 2022, she helped the Tuks Women team win the Centrales Sevens tournament in France.

Baloyi debuted for South Africa at the 2022 Commonwealth Games where they finished seventh overall.

In 2024, She was a member of the South African side that competed at the 2024 Summer Olympics.
