= Kiiahla Duff =

Australian rugby player (born 2003)

- Born: 28 August 2003 (age 23)
- Notable relative(s): Sariah Paki (cousin); Faith Nathan (cousin)

Rugby union career
National sevens team
Years	Team	Comps
2024-	Australia 7s	

Kiiahla Berryman-Duff (born 28 August 2003) is an Australian rugby union player.

== Career ==
In October 2024, Duff played for NSW Waratahs Women’s Sevens in the Next Gen Sevens. She scored a try for NSW in the final round of matches as they overcame Queensland to win the title.

Duff made her debut for Australia national rugby sevens team at the Dubai Sevens in the 2024–25 SVNS series against China, and scored her first international try against Canada. She continued with the Australia sevens team for the 2025-26 season.

In August 2026, she signed a new contract with Australia Sevens through to the Los Angeles Olympics in 2028. In November 2026, she was included in the Australia team for the opening tournament in the 2026–27 SVNS in Dubai.

== Personal life ==
She and her Australia teammates Sariah Paki and Faith Nathan are first cousins. Their mother's Te Aroha, Edith and Gloria are sisters.
