= Vani Buleki =

Fijian rugby sevens & league player (born 2000)

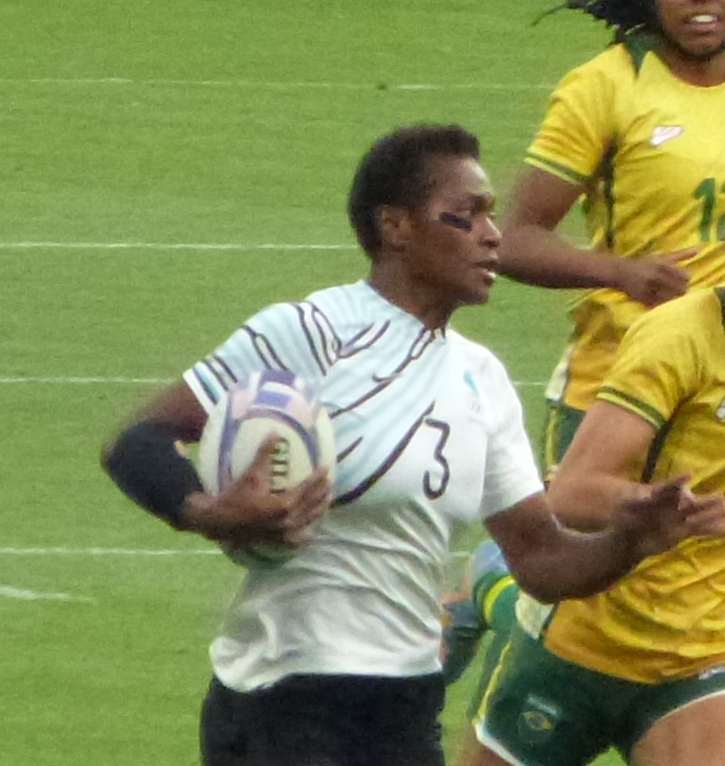
- Buleki at the 2024 Summer Olympics
- Full name: Adi Vani Buleki
- Born: 23 October 2000 (age 26) Suva, Fiji
- Height: 176 cm (5 ft 9 in)
- Weight: 79 kg (174 lb)

Rugby union career
Super Rugby
| Years | Team | Apps | (Points) |
| 2025 | Western Force | | (0) |
National sevens team
| Years | Team | | Comps |
- Fiji
- Rugby league career

Playing information
- Position: Wing
Club
| Years | Team | Pld | T | G | FG | P |
|---|---|---|---|---|---|---|
| 2025– | Canterbury-Bankstown Bulldogs | 6 | 1 | 0 | 0 | 4 |
- As of 29 September 2025
Medal record
Women's rugby sevens
Representing Fiji
Commonwealth Games
| Silver medal – second place | 2022 Birmingham | Team competition |

Adi Vani Buleki (born 23 October 2000) is a Fijian rugby union, sevens and rugby league player who currently plays wing for Canterbury-Bankstown Bulldogs in the NRLW.

She represented Fiji at the 2024 Summer Olympics.

== Rugby career ==
=== Fiji 7s ===
Buleki was part of the Fijiana sevens team that won the silver medal at the 2022 Commonwealth Games in Birmingham. She later competed at the Rugby World Cup Sevens in Cape Town.

She represented Fiji at the 2024 Summer Olympics in Paris. She signed with the Western Force for the 2025 Super Rugby Women's season.

=== Canterbury-Bankstown Bulldogs ===
On 15 May 2025 it was reported that she had signed for Canterbury-Bankstown Bulldogs in the NRLW
