= Lavena Cavuru =

Fijian rugby sevens player (born 1994)

- Born: 28 June 1994 (age 32) Naqelewai, Fiji
- Height: 165 cm (5 ft 5 in)
- Weight: 64 kg (141 lb)

Rugby union career
International career
Years	Team	Apps	(Points)
	Fiji	4	
National sevens team
Years	Team		Comps
- Fiji
Medal record
Women's rugby sevens
Representing Fiji
Olympic Games
Bronze medal – third place	2020 Tokyo	Team competition
Commonwealth Games
Silver medal – second place	2022 Birmingham	Team competition

Lavena Cavuru (born 28 June 1994) is a Fijian rugby sevens player. She won a bronze medal at the 2020 Summer Olympics. She also competed at the 2024 Paris Olympics.

== Rugby career ==
Cavuru competed in the women's tournament at the 2020 Summer Olympics. She won a bronze medal at the event.

Cavuru was part of the Fijiana sevens team that won the silver medal at the 2022 Commonwealth Games in Birmingham. She also competed at the Rugby World Cup Sevens in Cape Town. In September she played in a warm up match against Canada. She was also named in the Fijiana squad for the 2021 Rugby World Cup.

She represented Fiji at the 2024 Summer Olympics in Paris.
