= Liske Lategan =

South African rugby sevens player

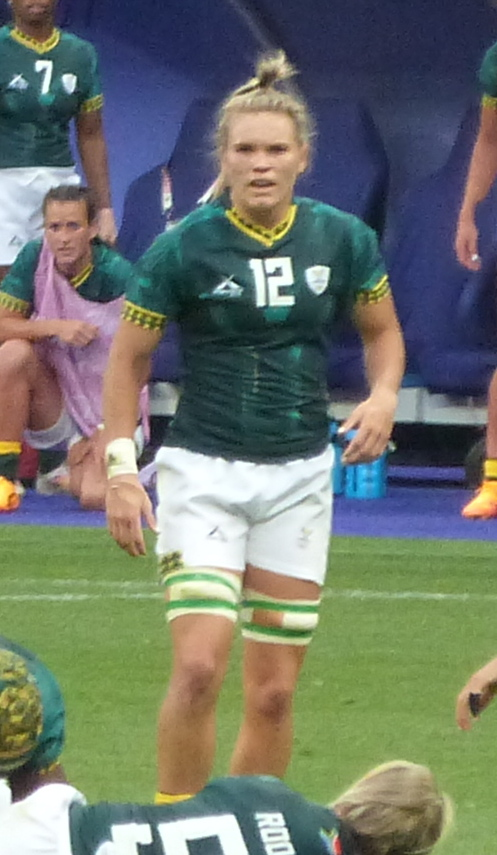
- Born: 25 November 1998 (age 27)
- Height: 171 cm (5 ft 7 in)
- Weight: 69 kg (152 lb; 10 st 12 lb)

Rugby union career
Senior career
Years	Team	Apps	(Points)
2026	Chennai Bulls		
National sevens team
Years	Team		Comps
2019–Present	South Africa		36

Liske Lategan (born 25 November 1998) is a South African rugby sevens player.

== Career ==
Lategan made her debut for the South African sevens team in 2019. She competed for South Africa at the 2022 Commonwealth Games. She scored a hat-trick in their seventh-place victory over Sri Lanka.

Lategan featured for the sevens side at the 2023 Africa Women's Sevens. She scored a try against Zimbabwe in their opening match.

She was a member of the South African side that competed at the 2024 Summer Olympics in Paris.

== Personal life ==
Lategan is the niece of former Springbok winger Pieter Hendriks, who scored the first try at the 1995 Rugby World Cup in South Africa. In 2017, she attended the University of Pretoria.
