= Sesenieli Donu =

Fijian rugby sevens player (born 1996)

- Born: 3 March 1996 (age 30) Vatukarasa, Fiji
- Height: 1.76 m (5 ft 9 in)
- Weight: 76 kg (168 lb)

Rugby union career
International career
Years	Team	Apps	(Points)
2022	Fiji	1	
National sevens team
Years	Team		Comps
- Fiji
Medal record
Representing Fiji
Women's rugby sevens
Olympic Games
Bronze medal – third place	2020 Tokyo	Team competition
Commonwealth Games
Silver medal – second place	2022 Birmingham	Team competition

Sesenieli Donu (born 3 March 1996) is a Fijian rugby sevens player. She competed in the 2020 and 2024 Summer Olympics.

== Personal life ==
Donu is from Vatukarasa Village in the Nadroga Navosa Province.

== Rugby career ==
Donu competed for Fiji in the women's tournament at the 2020 Summer Olympics.

She was part of the Fijiana sevens team that won the silver medal at the 2022 Commonwealth Games in Birmingham. She later competed at the 2022 Rugby World Cup Sevens in Cape Town.

In September 2022, she made her fifteens debut in a warm up match against Canada. She was later named in the Fijiana squad for the delayed 2021 Rugby World Cup.

She competed for Fiji at the 2024 Summer Olympics in Paris.
