= Sandika Hemakumari =

- Born: 2 January 1990 (age 36)

Rugby union career
National sevens team
Years	Team	Comps
- Sri Lanka

Sandika Hemakumari (born 2 January 1990) is a Sri Lankan rugby sevens player. She competed for Sri Lanka at the 2022 Commonwealth Games in Birmingham where they finished in eighth place.
