= Alicia Maude =

England international rugby union player

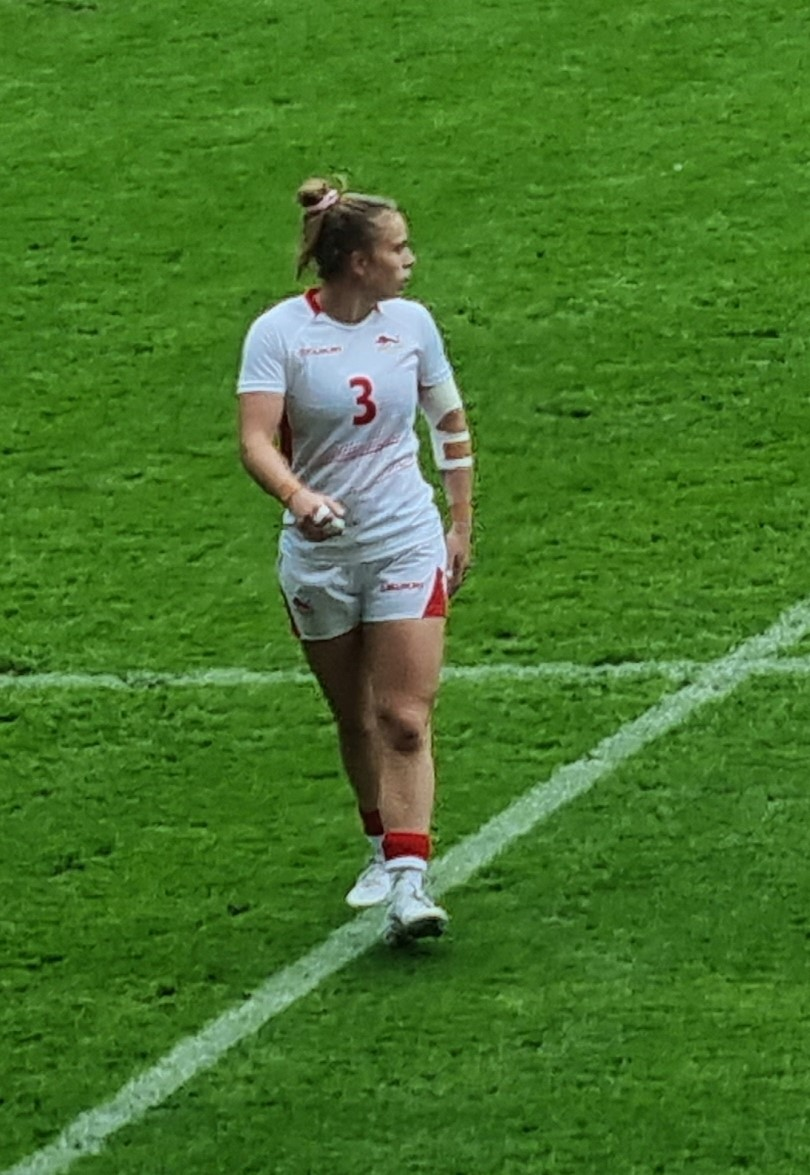
- Born: 17 May 2002 (age 24) Kingston upon Thames, London
- Height: 163 cm (5 ft 4 in)
- Weight: 67 kg (148 lb)

Rugby union career
- Position: Scrum-half
Senior career
Years	Team	Apps	(Points)
-2022	Gloucester-Hartpury		
2024-	Loughborough Lightning		
International career
Years	Team	Apps	(Points)
2022 -	England		
2023 -	Great Britain		

Alicia Maude (born 17 May 2002) is an English rugby union player who plays as a scrum-half for Loughborough Lightning and the Great Britain women's national rugby sevens team, having also played for England sevens and Gloucester-Hartpury.

== Early life ==
Born in Kingston-on-Thames, she was brought up in the New Forest. Maude started playing rugby union at the age of five years-old in Hampshire. She attended Hartpury College in Gloucestershire.

== Club career ==
She is a scrum half, and played for Ellingham and Ringwood RFC in her home county of Hampshire, the same club as England internationals Poppy Cleall and Bryony Cleall, prior to being signed to Premier 15s club Gloucester-Hartpury. She signed for fellow top division club Loughborough Lightning in July 2024. She made her debut for Loughborough against Sale Sharks in the PWR Up Series.

== International career ==
She played youth representative rugby union for England at under-18 and under-20 levels. Maude awarded a central contract with the senior England women's national rugby sevens team in December 2021. She was included in the England squad for the HSBC World Sevens Series tournament in Canada in April 2022.

Maude was selected to play for England at the 2022 Commonwealth Games in Birmingham for the rugby sevens competition. She was subsequently also named in the England squad for the 2022 Rugby World Cup Sevens – Women's tournament held in Cape Town, South Africa in September 2022.

She was selected for the Great Britain national rugby sevens team for the 2024-25 SVNS series which began at the Dubai Sevens on 30 November 2024.
