= Kumari Dilrukshi =

- Born: 18 January 1993 (age 33)
- Height: 1.5 m (4 ft 11 in)
- Weight: 53 kg (117 lb)

Rugby union career
National sevens team
Years	Team	Comps
- Sri Lanka

Kumari Dilrukshi (born 18 January 1993) is a Sri Lankan rugby sevens player. She competed for Sri Lanka at the 2022 Commonwealth Games in Birmingham where they finished in eighth place.
