= Shanika Madumali =

- Born: 4 April 1990 (age 36)

Rugby union career
National sevens team
Years	Team	Comps
- Sri Lanka

Shanika Madumali (born 4 April 1990) is a Sri Lankan rugby sevens player.

Madumali competed for Sri Lanka at the 2022 Commonwealth Games in Birmingham where they finished in eighth place.
