= Charani Liyanage =

Sri Lankan rugby sevens player

- Born: 5 July 1991 (age 35)

Rugby union career
National sevens team
Years	Team	Comps
- Sri Lanka

Charani Liyanage (born 5 July 1991) is a Sri Lankan rugby sevens player. She was named in Sri Lanka's squad for the 2022 Commonwealth Games in Birmingham where they finished eighth overall.
