= Sariah Paki =

Australia international rugby league & union player

- Born: 12 October 2001 (age 25) Manly, New South Wales, Australia
- Height: 1.72 m (5 ft 8 in)
- Weight: 65 kg (10 st 3 lb)
- Notable relative(s): Faith Nathan (cousin); Kiiahla Duff (cousin)

Rugby union career
- Position: Outside Back
Super Rugby
Years	Team	Apps	(Points)
2025	Waratahs		(0)
National sevens team
Years	Team		Comps
2018–26	Australia		32 (90 points)
- Rugby league career

Playing information
- Position: Second-row
Club
Years	Team	Pld	T	G	FG	P
2026–	Sydney Roosters	13	6	0	0	24
Representative
Years	Team	Pld	T	G	FG	P
2026	Australia	4	1	0	0	4
- As of 19 November 2026
Medal record
Women's rugby sevens
Representing Australia
Rugby Sevens World Cup
Gold medal – first place	2022 Cape Town	Team competition
Commonwealth Games
Gold medal – first place	2022 Birmingham	Team competition

Sariah Paki (born 12 October 2001) is an Australian rugby union and rugby league player; she currently plays as a second-row for Sydney Roosters in the NRLW.

== Personal life ==
Her sister Aaliyah Paki has played touch football for the Parramatta Eels in the NRL Touch Premiership in Australia. Paki and her Australia teammates Faith Nathan and Kiiahla Duff are first cousins. Their mother's Te Aroha, Edith and Gloria are sisters.

== Career ==
=== Rugby union ===
Paki was named in the Australia squad for the Rugby sevens at the 2020 Summer Olympics. The team came second in the pool round but then lost to Fiji 14-12 in the quarterfinals.

Paki won a gold medal with the Australian sevens team at the 2022 Commonwealth Games in Birmingham. She was a member of the Australian team that won the 2022 Sevens Rugby World Cup held in Cape Town, South Africa in September 2022.

She was named in Australia's sevens side for the 2024 Summer Olympics in Paris.

In December 2024, she was one of a number of Australia Sevens players who committed their intentions to play Super Rugby Women's in 2025, with Paki committing to the NSW Waratahs. She continued with the Australia sevens team for the 2025-26 season. She left the Australia Sevens program after they won the 2025-26 World Championship.

=== Rugby league ===
On 24 June 2026 it was announced that she was switching codes and had joined rugby league club Sydney Roosters for the 2026 season. She helped the Sydney Roosters win the NRLW premiership that year. She made her Australia international début in the 2026 Rugby League World Cup 78-0 win over England on 24 October 2026.

== Achievements and accolades ==
=== Representative ===
- Rugby League World Cup Champion: 2026
