= Dulani Pallikkondage =

- Born: 27 May 1992 (age 34)
- Height: 1.62 m (5 ft 4 in)
- Weight: 59 kg (130 lb)

Rugby union career
National sevens team
| Years | Team | Comps |
- Sri Lanka

Dulani Pallikkondage (born 27 May 1992) is a Sri Lankan rugby sevens player. She was selected to compete for Sri Lanka at the 2022 Commonwealth Games in Birmingham, they finished in eighth place.
