= Alena Saili =

NZ rugby union player

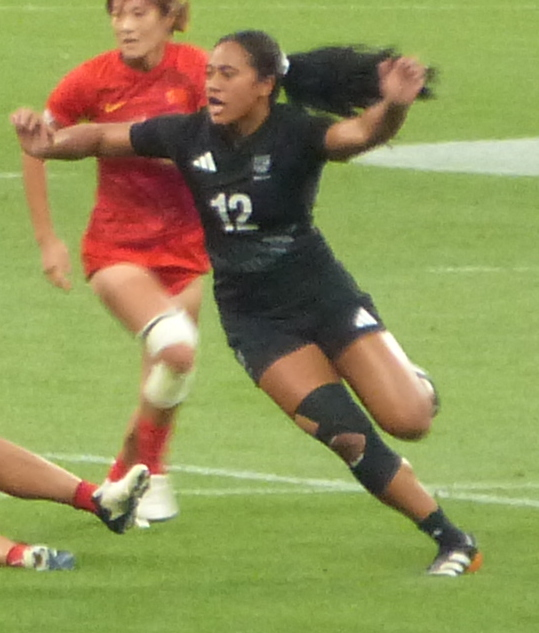
- Saili in 2024
- Born: 13 December 1998 (age 27) Porirua, New Zealand
- Height: 1.80 m (5 ft 11 in)
- Weight: 77 kg (170 lb)

Rugby union career
- Position: Forward
National sevens team
Years	Team	Comps
2017 – present	New Zealand	123 apps 54 tries 270 points
Medal record
Women's rugby sevens
Representing New Zealand
Olympic Games
Gold medal – first place	2024 Paris	Team competition
Gold medal – first place	2020 Tokyo	Team competition
Rugby World Cup Sevens
Silver medal – second place	2022 Cape Town	Team competition
Commonwealth Games
Gold medal – first place	2018 Gold Coast	Team competition
Bronze medal – third place	2022 Birmingham	Team competition

Alena Saili (born 13 December 1998) is a New Zealand rugby sevens player.is a New Zealand rugby union player. She plays seven-a-side and fifteen-a-side rugby union, and is a member of the New Zealand women's national rugby sevens team.

Saili joined the New Zealand women's national rugby sevens team in 2017. She was a member of the New Zealand women's sevens teams that won gold medals at the 2018 Commonwealth Games, the 2020 Summer Olympics in Tokyo and the 2024 Summer Olympics in Paris. In 2018–2019 she played five games for the fifteen-a-side New Zealand women's national rugby union team. Saili was a member of the New Zealand women's sevens team that it won a bronze medal at the 2022 Commonwealth Games in Birmingham. She was a member the New Zealand women's sevens team that won a silver medal at the Rugby World Cup Sevens in Cape Town.

Saili expanded her international career playing for Premier Rugby Sevens in the United States of America, signing with the Texas Team during the 2023 season.

== Early life ==
Saili was born in Porirua, on 13 December 1998 to Maima Afutu and Sefo Saili. When she was one years old she moved south with her family to Invercargill. As a child she watched her mother Maima play club rugby for the Collegiate Rugby Club in Invercargill. Maima went on to coach both secondary school and provincial teams. In 2021 she was appointed Southland District Rugby League’s rangatahi (youth) and female development officer. Alena Saili’s cousin Francis Saili, placed for both the Blues and the All Blacks, while his brother Peter Saili placed for the Blues.

She completed her secondary education at Southland Girls' High School in Invercargill.

At secondary school she played aerobics, basketball, netball. rugby union, touch rugby and volleyball. In January 2017 Saili was a member of New Zealand under 20 women's touch rugby team that played and lost of its three games against Australia in a trans-Tasman series. New Zealand lost all three of the games. it was only after her coaches suggested that she should focus on fewer sports that she began to concentrate on rugby union. She played for the school’s first fifteen girls rugby team from year 9 right through to year 13. It was after playing in a high school sevens tournament that she realised that she loved this format better.

== Rugby career ==
At the South Island Regional sevens tournament in December 2014 Saili who just meet the minimum age requirement by turning 16 on the day of the tournament was a major contributor to the Southland women’s team getting third and thus meeting the criteria to play in the 2015 national sevens tournament.

In January 2017, in her first year after leaving secondary school Saili joined the New Zealand women's national rugby sevens team on a full contract. She made her debut at the age of 19 at Sydney In early 2018 she was again awarded a 12 month contract with the sevens team. She was a member of the Black Ferns team that won a gold medal at the 2018 Commonwealth Games.

=== Fifteen-a-side ===
At the age of 19 Saili made her debut for the Black Ferns 15-a-side rugby team against Australia in Sydney on 18 August 2018. She made further appearances; against Australia in Auckland on 25 August, against Canada in San Diego on 28 June 2019, against France in San Diego on 6 July 2019, with her last against England in San Diego on 14 July 2019. Three of the games were as substitute.

=== 2020 Tokyo Olympic Games ===
In January 2019 she was awarded a full 12 month contract with the sevens team. Two months prior to Tokyo Olympics she fractured a shoulder in training, but with treatment she became fit enough to be considered for selection. She was selected for the team, which went on to win the gold medal.

After Nathan Cohen, Saili became the second person from the province of Southland to win an Olympic gold medal. Upon her return from Tokyo she spent 14 days isolating at a managed isolation and quarantine (MIQ) facility in Christchurch before being reunited with family in her home town, where she visited her former school, Southland Girls’ High School in August 2021. Here she was honoured with a full school haka in the school’s gym.

=== 2022 Birmingham Commonwealth Games ===
Saili was named in the New Zealand women's sevens team for the 2022 Commonwealth Games in Birmingham. She won a bronze medal at the event.

She was part of the Black Ferns sevens team that won a silver medal at the Rugby World Cup Sevens in Cape Town.

=== 2023 Premier Rugby Sevens ===
In May 2023, Saili announced she was going to head over to the United States of America to play in Premier Rugby Sevens. Saili signed with the Texas Team, playing alongside New Zealand sevens teammate, Tysha Ikenasio.

Saili ended the year totalling, two tries, 10 points, seven tackle, six carries, and one steal. Team went 1–3 throughout the season picking up their lone win at Highmark Stadium in Pittsburgh, Pa. against the Pittsburgh Steeltoes. Texas dominated Pittsburgh, shutting the Steeltoes out 29–0.

Both of Saili’s tries were scored at the Eastern Conference Finals in Pittsburgh. She had a solid day having one linebreak, four offloads, and three tackles to go along with the pair of tries.

Saili and the team went 0–2 at the Eastern Conference Kickoff at Q2 Stadium in Austin, Tx. falling to the New York Locals and the Steeltoes.

=== Return to New Zealand sevens duties ===
Following the completion of her time in the Premier Rugby Sevens Saili returned to New Zealand and served as a member of the New Zealand team that contested the 2023–2024 World Rugby Sevens competition and won its league title. Over the course of the competition she played 24 games, and scored seven tries.

=== 2024 Paris Olympics ===
On 20 June 2024 it was announced that she had been selected as a member of the New Zealand Women’s Rugby Sevens team for the Paris Olympics. The team won the gold medal, defeating Canada 19–12 in the final to give both her and New Zealand back-to-back Olympic gold medals.

== Awards and honours ==
- 2016–17, ILT Southland junior sportsperson of the year.
- 2018–19, ILT Southland junior sportsperson of the year.
- 2021–22, ILT Southland senior sportsperson of the year.
