= Umayangana Thathsarani =

- Born: 21 December 2000 (age 25)

Rugby union career
National sevens team
Years	Team	Comps
- Sri Lanka

Umayangana Thathsarani (born 21 December 2000) is a Sri Lankan rugby sevens player.

== Biography ==
Thathsarani captained Sri Lanka's U17 girls team at the Asian Qualifiers in Dubai, it was to qualify for the 2018 Youth Olympic Games in Buenos Aires. She represented Sri Lanka at the Asia Rugby U18 Girls’ Championship in Dubai in 2018.

In 2021, Thathsarani was named in Sri Lanka's squad for the 2021 Asia Rugby Women's Sevens.

Thathsarani competed for Sri Lanka at the 2022 Commonwealth Games in Birmingham where they finished in eighth place.
