= Zandile Masuku =

South African rugby sevens player

- Full name: Zandile Senzekile Masuku
- Born: 2 December 1998 (age 27)

Rugby union career
National sevens team
Years	Team	Comps
- South Africa

Zandile Senzekile Masuku (born 2 December 1998) is a South African rugby sevens player. She was born and raised in Limpopo province, South Africa. She competed for South Africa at the 2022 Commonwealth Games in Birmingham. She scored a brace of tries in their seventh-place victory over Sri Lanka.
