= Lauren Torley =

English rugby union and sevens player

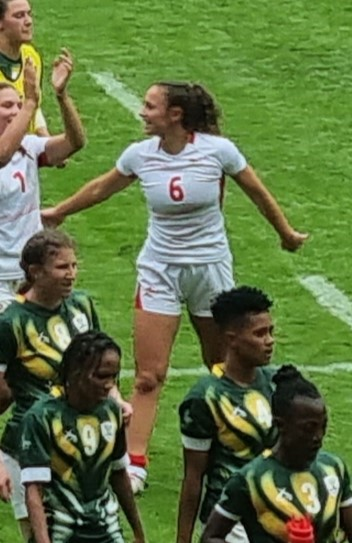
- Born: 2 September 1999 (age 27)
- Height: 176 cm (5 ft 9 in)
- Weight: 79 kg (174 lb)

Rugby union career
- Position: Fullback
Senior career
Years	Team	Apps	(Points)
- DMP Sharks
2022 -	Harlequins Women	31	
International career
Years	Team	Apps	(Points)
2022–	England		
2023–	Great Britain		
Medal record
Women's rugby sevens
Representing Great Britain
European Games
Gold medal – first place	2023 Kraków–Małopolska	Team competition

Lauren Nancy Torley (born 2 September 1999) is an English rugby union player who plays for the Great Britain women's national rugby sevens team, having also played for England sevens.

== Early life ==
Torley grew up in Flackwell Heath, Buckinghamshire. She attended Claytons Primary School and then Beaconsfield High School. Torley graduated with a Bachelor of Science (BSc) in Psychology and Nutrition from Newcastle University in 2022. She then pursued a Master of Science (MSc) in Applied Sport Psychology at St Mary's University, Twickenham on a scholarship.

== Career ==
It was in the summer of 2018 that Torley took up Touch Rugby. She had moved on to contact rugby in Newcastle by the autumn of 2019. Torley had not played sevens rugby prior to being called up by England sevens squad for training in March 2022. She was then subsequently selected for the HSBC World Rugby Sevens Series event in Langford, Canada, in late April and early May 2022. Torley was selected to play for England at the 2022 Commonwealth Games in rugby sevens. She was named in the England squad for the 2022 Rugby World Cup Sevens – Women's tournament held in Cape Town, South Africa in September 2022.

She was selected to be a member of the GB sevens squad for the 2023 European Games. Great Britain won a gold medal at the event and sealed qualification for the 2024 Olympic Games. In June 2024, she was named in the British squad for the Olympic Games. The team finished seventh.

She was selected for the Great Britain national rugby sevens team for the 2024-25 SVNS series which began at the Dubai Sevens on 30 November 2024. She returned to the Great Britain Sevens team ahead of the 2026 Hong Kong Sevens.
