= Kanchana Mahendran =

- Born: 12 January 1998 (age 28)
- Height: 1.57 m (5 ft 2 in)
- Weight: 75 kg (165 lb)

Rugby union career
National sevens team
Years	Team	Comps
- Sri Lanka

Kanchana Mahendran (born 12 January 1998) is a Sri Lankan rugby sevens player.

Mahendran competed for Sri Lanka at the 2022 Commonwealth Games in Birmingham where they finished in eighth place.
