= Anusha Attanayaka =

- Born: 27 June 1990 (age 36)

Rugby union career
National sevens team
Years	Team	Comps
- Sri Lanka

Anusha Attanayaka (born 27 June 1990) is a Sri Lankan rugby sevens player. She competed for Sri Lanka at the 2022 Commonwealth Games in Birmingham where they finished in eighth place.
