= Ayesha Perera =

- Born: 18 October 1988 (age 38)
- Height: 1.62 m (5 ft 4 in)
- Weight: 62 kg (137 lb)

Rugby union career
National sevens team
Years	Team	Comps
- Sri Lanka

Ayesha Perera (born 18 October 1988) is a Sri Lankan rugby sevens player.

Perera competed for Sri Lanka at the 2022 Commonwealth Games in Birmingham where they finished in eighth place.
