= Jeewanthi Gunawardhana =

Sri Lankan rugby player

- Born: 29 December 1997 (age 28)
- Height: 1.65 m (5 ft 5 in)
- Weight: 50 kg (110 lb)

Rugby union career
National sevens team
Years	Team	Comps
- Sri Lanka

Jeewanthi Gunawardhana (born 29 December 1997) is a Sri Lankan rugby sevens player. She competed for Sri Lanka at the 2022 Commonwealth Games in Birmingham, they finished eighth overall.
