= Krissy Scurfield =

Canadian rugby union and sevens player

Krissy Scurfield OLY
- Born: 15 June 2003 (age 23) Canmore, Alberta, Canada
- Height: 168 cm (5 ft 6 in)
- Weight: 66 kg (146 lb)

Rugby union career
- Position(s): Winger, Centre
International career
Years	Team	Apps	(Points)
2022 -	Canada		
Medal record
Women's rugby sevens
Representing Canada
Olympic Games
Silver medal – second place	2024 Paris	Team competition

Krissy Scurfield OLY (born 15 June 2003) is a Canadian rugby union player. She won a silver medal in the rugby sevens at the 2024 Summer Olympics.

== Career ==
A student at the University of Victoria, Scurfield was the only Canadian woman named to the World Rugby Series’ Dream Team in 2022 and was the Canadian’s top try scorer despite only featuring in half the games. Scurfield was selected to play for Canada at the 2022 Commonwealth Games in rugby sevens.

Scurfield competed for Canada at the 2022 Rugby World Cup Sevens in Cape Town. They placed sixth overall after losing to Fiji in the fifth place final.

Chosen for the 2024 Summer Olympics in Paris, France, she suffered an internal laceration during the group stages and missed the rest of the tournament. The team went on to win a silver medal.

She was selected in the Canadian side for the 2025 Pacific Four Series.

In July 2026, Scurfield was one of the first players announced for the Ultimate Sevens Championship, prior to the inaugural competition set to launch later that year.

== Personal ==
Scurfields father, Allan Scurfield was the 1984 Canadian National high-board diving champion who competed with Canada's National Team at both the Commonwealth and Pan-American Games.
