= Faith Nathan =

Australian rugby union player

- Born: 27 July 2000 (age 26)
- Height: 1.64 m (5 ft 5 in)
- Weight: 65 kg (143 lb)

Rugby union career
National sevens team
Years	Team	Comps
2019–	Australia	175 (630 points)
Medal record
Women's rugby sevens
Representing Australia
Rugby Sevens World Cup
Gold medal – first place	2022 Cape Town	Team competition
Commonwealth Games
Gold medal – first place	2022 Birmingham	Team competition
Pacific Games
Silver medal – second place	2019 Pacific Games	Team competition

Faith Nathan (born 27 July 2000) is an Australian rugby union player. She has represented her country in rugby sevens at Olympic and Commonwealth Games and at the Rugby Sevens World Cup.

== Rugby career ==
Nathan was named in the Australia squad for the Rugby sevens at the 2020 Summer Olympics. The team came second in the pool round but then lost to Fiji 14–12 in the quarterfinals.

Nathan won a gold medal with the Australian sevens team at the 2022 Commonwealth Games in Birmingham. She was a member of the Australian team that won the 2022 Sevens Rugby World Cup held in Cape Town, South Africa in September 2022. Against Madagascar during the tournament she became the first Australian woman to ever score five tries in one match at the rugby sevens World Cup.

In 2024, She was selected in the Australian women's sevens side for the Summer Olympics in Paris. She continued with the Australia sevens team for the 2025-26 season. That year, she signed a contract to continue with Australia Sevens through to the 2028 Olympic Games.

In July 2026, she was one of the first players announced for the Ultimate Sevens Championship, prior to the inaugural competition set to launch later that year.

== Personal life ==
Nathan and her Australian sevens teammates Sariah Paki and Kiiahla Duff are first cousins. Their mothers Te Aroha, Edith and Gloria are sisters.
