= Anushika Samaraweera =

- Born: 4 July 1992 (age 34)

Rugby union career
National sevens team
Years	Team	Comps
- Sri Lanka

Anushika Samaraweera (born 4 July 1992) is a Sri Lankan rugby sevens player.

Samaraweera competed for Sri Lanka at the 2022 Commonwealth Games in Birmingham where they finished in eighth place.
