= Isla Norman-Bell =

English rugby union and sevens player

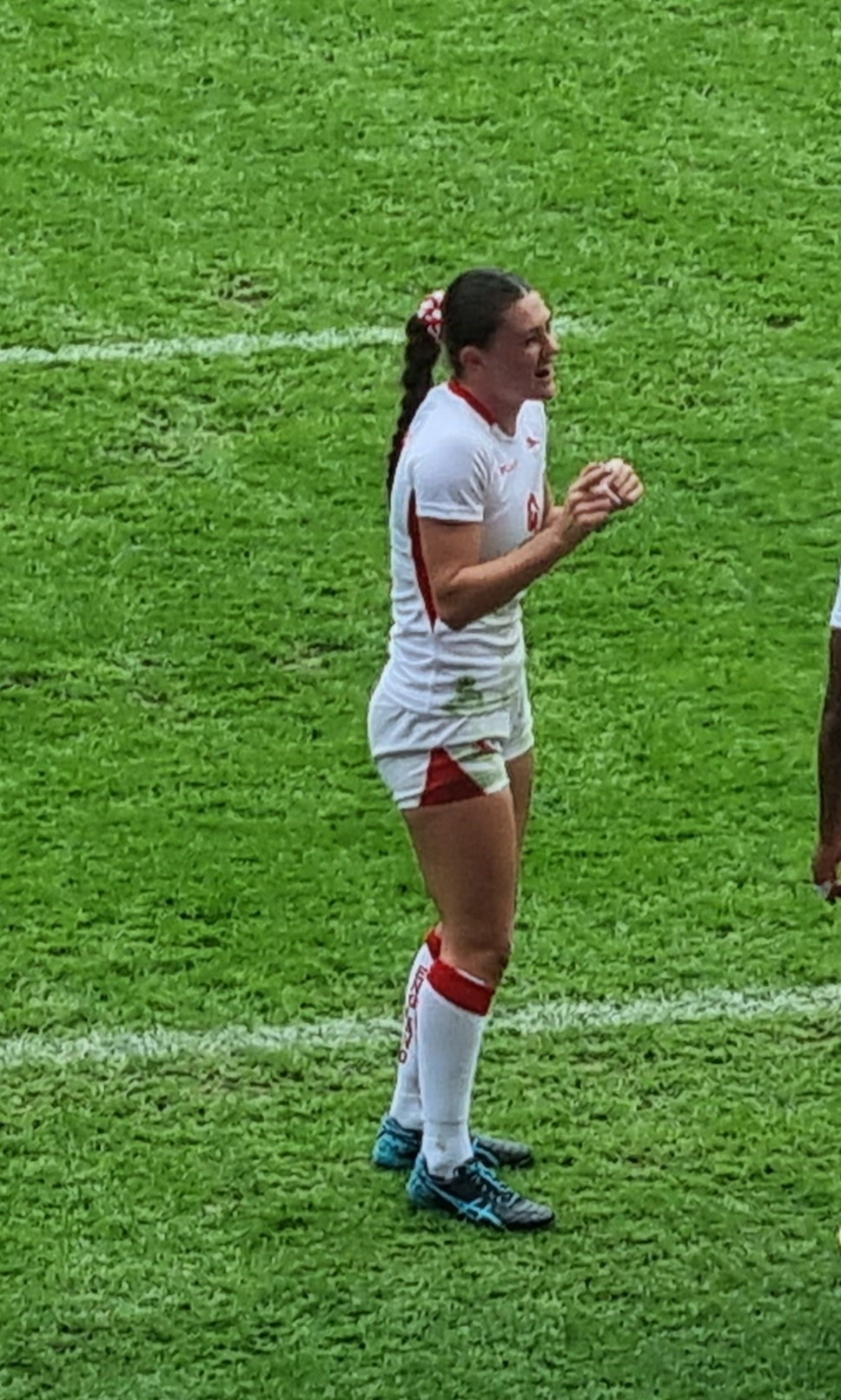
- Norman-Bell at the 2022 Commonwealth Games
- Born: 21 February 2000 (age 26) Rochester, Kent
- Height: 162 cm (5 ft 4 in)
- Weight: 58 kg (128 lb; 9 st 2 lb)

Rugby union career
- Position: back
Senior career
Years	Team	Apps	(Points)
2025-	Trailfinders Women		
International career
Years	Team	Apps	(Points)
2022 -	England		
2023 -	Great Britain		
Medal record
Women's rugby sevens
Representing Great Britain
European Games
Gold medal – first place	2023 Kraków–Małopolska	Team competition

Isla Norman-Bell (born 21 February 2000) Ngāpuhi, Te Whanāu-ā-Apanui, Ngāti Awa is an England rugby union player who played for the Great Britain women's national rugby sevens team at the 2024 Paris Olympic Games and has also played for England sevens.

== Career ==
Born in Rochester, Kent, England, but brought up from the age of two in New Zealand, Norman-Bell was first called up to train with England sevens in December 2021. Prior to this, Norman-Bell attended the University of Auckland, and in 2019 she was named their sportswoman of the year. She was given a place on the New Zealand Women’s Sevens Development team to tour internationally and later played for the New Zealand Open Women’s Touch team at the World Championships in Malaysia. Norman-Bell was named in the 2019 Vodafone Warriors Women’s team that played in the NRL Touch Premiership, and played on the wing for Auckland Storm in the Farah Palmer Cup.

Norman-Bell was selected to play for England at the 2022 Commonwealth Games in rugby sevens. She was named in the England squad for the 2022 Rugby World Cup Sevens – Women's tournament held in Cape Town, South Africa in September 2022. She was a selected as a member of the GB sevens squad for the 2023 European Games. Great Britain won a gold medal at the event and sealed qualification for the 2024 Olympic Games. In June 2024, she was named in the British squad for the Olympic Games. The team finished seventh.

She was named as vice-captain for the Great Britain national rugby sevens team for the 2024-25 SVNS series which began at the Dubai Sevens on 30 November 2024.

Having joined the club in June 2025, Norman-Bell played for Trailfinders Women as they reached the PWR final of the 2025–26 Premiership Women's Rugby season.
