= Amy Wilson-Hardy =

English rugby union and sevens player

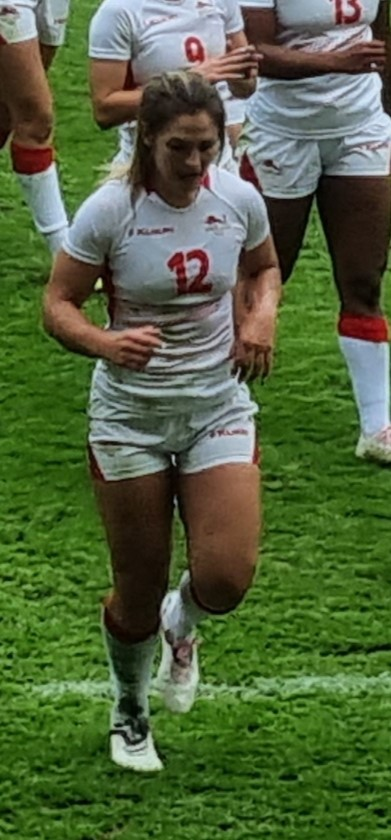
- Wilson-Hardy at the 2022 Commonwealth Games
- Full name: Amy Alexandra Wilson-Hardy
- Born: 13 September 1991 (age 35) Poole, Dorset, England
- Height: 168 cm (5 ft 6 in)
- Weight: 70 kg (154 lb)
- School: Our Lady of Sion, Worthing/Worthing College
- University: University of Bath

Rugby union career
- Position: Centre/Wing
Amateur team(s)
Years	Team	Apps	(Points)
2003–2010	Worthing Raiders		
Senior career
Years	Team	Apps	(Points)
2010–2018	Bristol Ladies		
2018-2023	Wasps		
2023-Present	Trailfinders Women		
International career
Years	Team	Apps	(Points)
2013–present	England	10	(40)
National sevens team
Years	Team		Comps
2013–Present	Great Britain		Rio 2016
Medal record
Representing Great Britain
Women's rugby sevens
Commonwealth Games
Bronze medal – third place	2018 Gold Coast	Women's tournament
European Games
Gold medal – first place	2023 Kraków–Małopolska	Team competition
Representing England
Women's rugby union
Rugby World Cup
Silver medal – second place	2017 Ireland	Team competition

Amy Alexandra Wilson-Hardy (born 13 September 1991) is an English rugby union player. She plays for England's women's fifteens team and competed at the 2017 Women's Rugby World Cup. She also plays for Ealing Trailfinders in the Premiership Women's Rugby competition. Wilson-Hardy has also represented England and Great Britain in international rugby sevens. She competed for Great Britain at the 2016 and 2024 Summer Olympics.

== Rugby career ==
Wilson-Hardy made her international debut for the England women's national rugby union team in 2013. She was selected as a member of the Great Britain women's national rugby sevens team to the 2016 Summer Olympics.

She plays for Trailfinders Women in the Women's Premiership. She was selected for the 2017 Women's Rugby World Cup squad.

She won a bronze medal at the 2018 Commonwealth Games.

In June 2024, she was named in the British squad for the 2024 Paris Olympics. She was later forced to withdraw from the final GB game of the tournament after being implicated in a racist social media post. The team finished seventh. In September 2024, the Rugby Football Union announced no further action would be taken following an investigation into the alleged racist message, stating Wilson-Hardy had "expressed great remorse" for the "historical private message" and had "committed to undertake an inclusion and diversity awareness education course."

She was selected for the Great Britain national rugby sevens team for the 2024-25 SVNS series which began at the Dubai Sevens on 30 November 2024.
