= Shona Campbell =

Scotland international rugby union player

- Born: 7 June 2001 (age 25) Dundee, Scotland
- Height: 1.64 m (5 ft 4 1/2 in)
- Weight: 58 kg (128 lb; 9 st 2 lb)

Rugby union career
- Position: Winger
Senior career
Years	Team	Apps	(Points)
2020 - present	University of Edinburgh		
International career
Years	Team	Apps	(Points)
2021–present	Scotland	9	(0)
Medal record
Women's rugby sevens
Representing Great Britain
European Games
Gold medal – first place	2023 Kraków–Małopolska	Team competition

Shona Campbell (born 7 June 2001) is a Scottish rugby player from Dundee who currently plays for Sale Sharks Women in Premiership Women's Rugby. Previously she has represented Scotland during the Women's Six Nations, at the Women's Rugby World Cup in New Zealand, and Great Britain Rugby Sevens on the HSBC SVNS World Series, and the Commonwealth Games in Birmingham. She is also a touch rugby Gold Medallist for the Scottish team and has played netball for Scotland under 21s.

== Club career ==
Campbell played full back and wing for Edinburgh University. She started playing rugby when she was five for Montrose, playing there until the age of 14, before taking a break to compete at a national level in netball. In 2025 Campbell signed for Sale Sharks Women ahead of the 2025/26 season, primarily playing on the wing with Scotland teammate Rhona Lloyd. Campbell won the league's "try of the season" award in 2025/26, before renewing her Sale contract for season 26/27.

== International career ==
Campbell played rugby for Scotland U18s 7s, with the team securing sixth place in the Rugby Europe 2019 Championship.

She has also played touch rugby at a national level in the Scotland mixed open. In 2019, she was the youngest player to be selected for the adult's mixed team at 17 years old. She travelled with them to play in the World Cup finals in Malaysia, where the team were bronze medalists. Two years prior to that, she played for the Scottish Under 18s touch rugby team, competing in the Junior Touch Rugby European Championships in Dublin. In the 2019 European Touch Rugby Championships she was part of the winning team and was named junior female player of the year.

She was called up for Scotland's 2021 Women's Six Nations Squad. Gordon Lyon, who has helped coach her at Edinburgh University, commented on her call-up, “Shona is one of the most exciting players we have seen in Scotland for a while... She is a very balanced runner and can find space like no other - I reckon she could easily sidestep a player in a telephone box!"

== Personal life ==
Campbell is a student at Edinburgh University. She attended the High School of Dundee and was awarded the schools' "Sports Personality of the Year" award for featuring in the Scotland mixed open adult team that won bronze at the Touch Rugby World Cup.

She played netball for Scotland U17, U21 and Edinburgh University, before switching to the university rugby team to train for the Six Nations.

== Honours ==
- Touch Rugby Bronze Medalists, Mixed Open Touch World Cup 2020
- Touch Rugby European Gold Medalists 2019
- European Junior female player of the year 2019
