= Sri Lanka women's national rugby sevens team =

Sri Lanka Women's Sevens
- Union: Sri Lanka Rugby Football Union
- Coach: Sudath Sampath
- Captain: Thanuja Weerakkodi

World Cup Sevens
- Appearances: 0

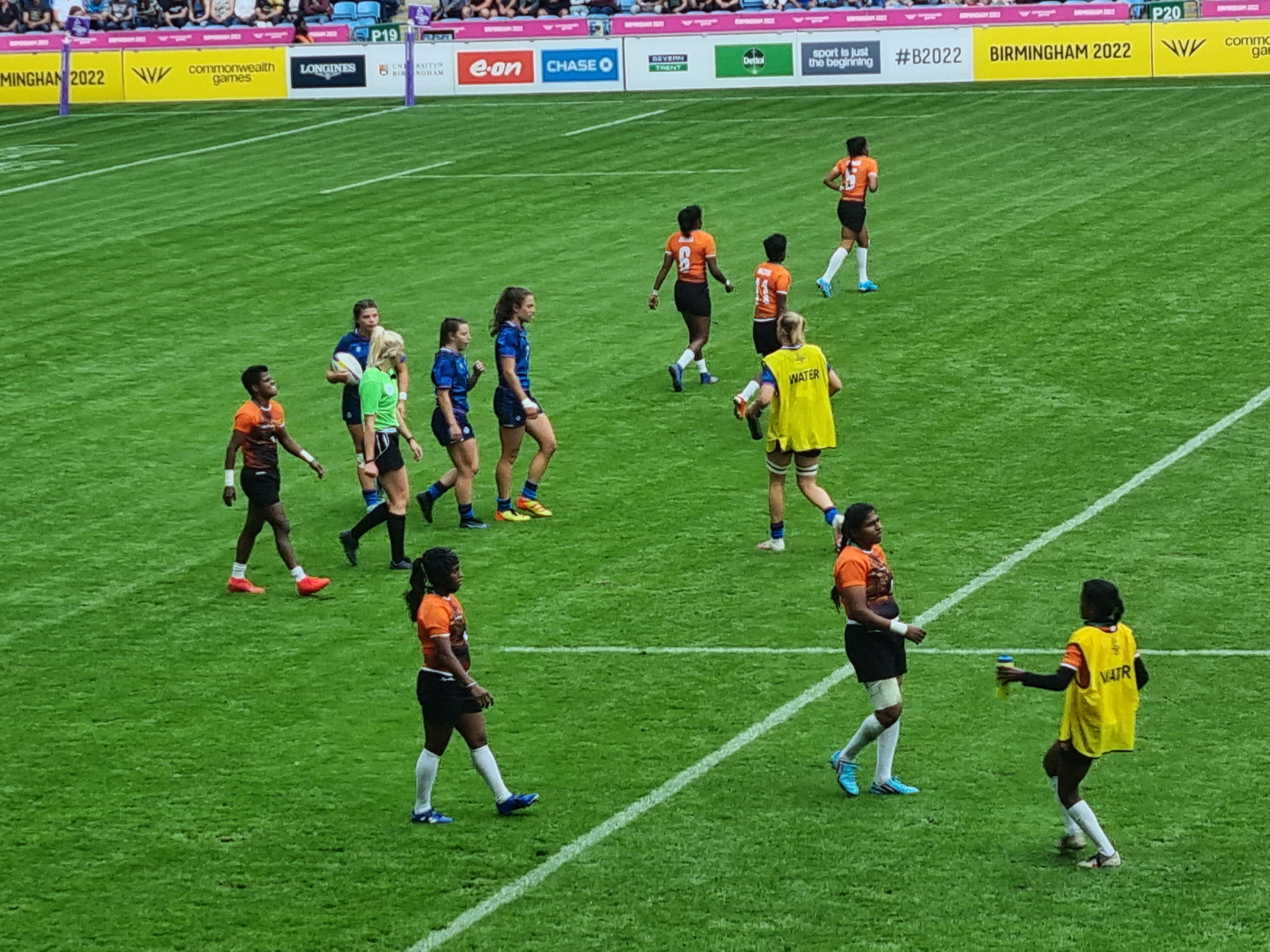
Sri Lanka vs Scotland at the 2022 Commonwealth Games.

Sri Lanka's women's national rugby sevens team represents Sri Lanka in Rugby sevens at international level.

== Tournament history ==
=== Hong Kong Women's Sevens ===
Sri Lanka was invited to participate in the Hong Kong Women's Sevens held in March 2004. They finished fourth in their pool and ninth overall. In 2006, Sri Lanka finished ninth at the Hong Kong Sevens, losing in the Vase final to Hong Kong 26 - 5.

At the 2016 tournament, Sri Lanka finished fourth in its pool and tenth in the Bowl, final losing to Kenya 29 - 0.

=== Asian Women's Sevens Championship ===
At the Asian Championship held in Doha, Qatar in April 2007. Sri Lanka was defeated in the Shield final, losing 19–5 to Uzbekistan. In 2008, the tournament was held in Hong Kong in October. Sri Lanka finished third in their pool and ninth in the tournament.

At the 2012 tournament in Pune, India, Sri Lanka finished third in its pool and ninth in the tournament, winning the Bowl final. The first leg of the 2013 Asian Women's Sevens Series was held in Chonburi, Thailand in September. Sri Lanka finished second in its pool and fifth in the tournament, winning the Plate final. The second leg was held in Pune, India in November. Sri Lanka finished fourth in its pool and seventh in the tournament.

In 2014, the first leg was held in Hong Kong in August. Sri Lanka finished fourth in its pool and fifth in the tournament, winning the Plate final. The second leg was held in Beijing, China in October. Sri Lanka finished third in its pool and sixth in the tournament, losing the Plate final.

2015

The first leg was held in Qingdao, China in September 2015. Sri Lanka finished fourth in its pool and eighth in the tournament. The second leg was held in Colombo, Sri Lanka in October 2015. Sri Lanka finished third in its pool and eighth in the tournament.

2016

The first leg was held in Korea in September. Sri Lanka did not compete. The second leg was held in Hong Kong in October 2016. Sri Lanka finished third in its pool and sixth in the tournament, losing the Plate final. The final leg was held in Colombo, Sri Lanka in October 2016. Sri Lanka finished third in its pool and sixth in the tournament, losing the Plate final.

Sri Lanka also competed at the 2019 Asia Rugby Women's Sevens Series and placed sixth overall.

=== Women's Sevens Olympic Qualifier ===
The 2015 ARFU Women's Sevens Championships was an Olympic qualifying tournament. The first leg of the tournament was held in Hong Kong on 7–8 November 2015. Sri Lanka finished fifth after the pool matches and sixth in the tournament, losing the Bowl final. The second leg of the tournament was held in Tokyo, Japan on 28–29 November 2015. Sri Lanka finished fifth after the pool matches and in the tournament, winning the Bowl final. Sri Lanka finished equal fifth in the competition overall and failed to qualify for the 2016 Summer Olympics.

== Records ==
=== Commonwealth Games ===
Year	Round	Position	P	W	D	L
(Australia) 2018	Did Not Participate					
(England) 2022	7th Place Match	8th	5	0	0	5
Total	0 Titles	1/2	5	0	0	5

== Team ==
Sri Lanka sevens squad to the 2022 Commonwealth Games.

- Head coach: Saliya Kumara

No.	Player	Date of birth (age)
1	Anusha Attanayaka	27 June 1990 (age 31)
2	Kumari Dilrukshi	18 January 1993 (age 28)
3	Jeewanthi Gunawardhana	29 December 1997 (age 24)
4	Sandika Hemakumari	2 January 1990 (age 31)
5	Dilini Kanchana	18 May 1995 (age 26)
6	Charani Liyanage	5 July 1991 (age 30)
7	Shanika Madumali	4 April 1990 (age 31)
8	Kanchana Mahendran	12 January 1998 (age 23)
9	Dulani Pallikkondage	27 May 1992 (age 29)
10	Ayesha Perera	18 October 1988 (age 33)
11	Nipuni Rasanjali	28 November 1999 (age 22)
12	Anushika Samaraweera	4 July 1992 (age 29)
13	Umayangana Thathsarani	21 December 2000 (age 21)
