= Rugby sevens at the 2022 Commonwealth Games =

- Rugby Sevens pictogram for the Games
- Venue: Coventry Stadium
- Location: Coventry, England
- Dates: 29–31 July 2022
- Competitors: 312 from 16 nations

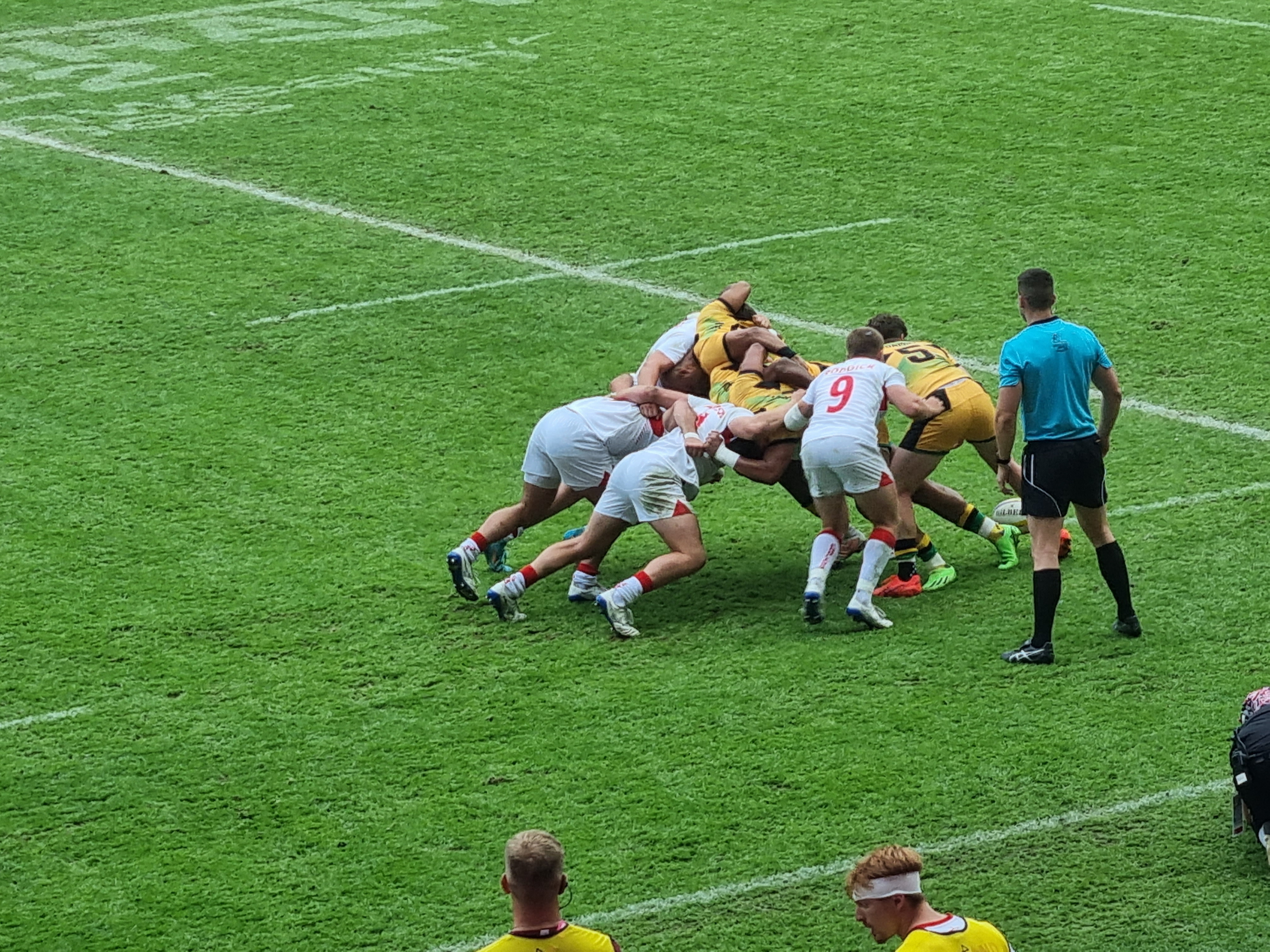
The England vs Jamaica men's rugby sevens match

Rugby sevens at the 2022 Commonwealth Games was the seventh appearance of Rugby sevens at the Commonwealth Games. The rugby sevens competition was held at the Coventry Stadium from 29 to 31 July 2022.

A total of 16 teams competed in the men's tournament, while eight contested the women's tournament. South Africa won the men's tournament, while Australia won the women's.

== Schedule ==
The competition schedule was as follows:

G	Group stage	CM	Classification matches	¼	Quarter-finals	½	Semi-finals	B	Bronze medal match	F	Gold medal match

Date Event	Fri 29		Sat 30			Sun 31				
Session →	M	E	M	E		A		E		
Men	G		G	CM	¼	CM	½	CM	B	F
Women	G		G	CM	½			CM	B	F

== Venue ==
The tournaments were originally scheduled to take place at Villa Park, but instead took place at the Coventry Stadium in Coventry. The venue was moved because there were concerns with Villa Park being available. The football season was anticipated to start earlier because of the 2022 FIFA World Cup scheduling.

The adjacent Coventry Arena will play host to judo and wrestling.

== Medal summary ==
=== Medal table ===
Rank	Nation	Gold	Silver	Bronze	Total
1	Australia	1	0	0	1
1	South Africa	1	0	0	1
3	Fiji	0	2	0	2
4	New Zealand	0	0	2	2
Totals (4 entries)		2	2	2	6

=== Medallists ===
Event	Gold	Silver	Bronze
Men	South Africa; James Murphy; Zain Davids; Angelo Davids; JC Pretorius; Selvyn Davids; Shaun Williams; Muller du Plessis; Sakoyisa Makata; Christie Grobbelaar; Dewald Human; Siviwe Soyizwapi; Mfundo Ndhlovu	Fiji; Josua Vakurunabili; Sevuloni Mocenacagi; Tevita Daugunu; Waisea Nacuqu; Filipe Sauturaga; Kaminieli Rasaku; Sireli Maqala; Semi Kunatani; Jerry Matana; Elia Canakaivata; Vuiviawa Naduvalo; Jerry Tuwai	New Zealand; Tone Ng Shiu; Dylan Collier; Ngarohi McGarvey-Black; Sam Dickson; Caleb Tangitau; Leroy Carter; Joe Webber; Che Clark; Akuila Rokolisoa; Regan Ware; Sione Molia; Moses Leo
Women	Australia; Sharni Williams; Faith Nathan; Alysia Lefau-Fakaosilea; Charlotte Caslick; Madison Ashby; Sariah Paki; Maddison Levi; Dominique du Toit; Jesse Southwell; Tia Hinds; Demi Hayes; Teagan Levi	Fiji; Adi Vani Buleki; Raijieli Daveua; Rusila Nagasau; Reapi Ulunisau; Ana Maria Naimasi; Viniana Riwai; Sesenieli Donu; Vasiti Solikoviti; Verenaisi Ditavutu; Lavena Cavuru; Laisana Moceisawana; Lavenia Tinai	New Zealand; Shiray Kaka; Sarah Hirini; Michaela Blyde; Tyla Nathan-Wong; Kelly Brazier; Theresa Fitzpatrick; Portia Woodman; Risi Pouri-Lane; Stacey Fluhler; Niall Williams; Alena Saili; Jazmin Hotham

== Qualification ==
=== Summary ===
CGA	Men	Women	Athletes
Australia	Yes	Yes	26
Canada	Yes	Yes	26
England	Yes	Yes	26
Fiji	Yes	Yes	26
Jamaica	Yes		13
Kenya	Yes		13
Malaysia	Yes		13
New Zealand	Yes	Yes	26
Samoa	Yes		13
Scotland	Yes	Yes	26
South Africa	Yes	Yes	26
Sri Lanka	Yes	Yes	26
Tonga	Yes		13
Uganda	Yes		13
Wales	Yes		13
Zambia	Yes		13
TOTAL: 16 CGAs	16	8	312

=== Men ===
Sixteen nations qualified for the men's tournament at the 2022 Commonwealth Games:

- The host nation.
- The top nine nations in combined standings from the 2018–19 and 2019–20 World Rugby Sevens Series, excluding the host nation.
- The top nation not yet qualified from each of the four regional qualifiers, plus the second nation from the Africa and Asia qualifiers.

Means of qualification	Date	Location	Quotas	Qualified
Host Nation	—N/a	—N/a	1	England
2018–19 & 2019–20; World Rugby Sevens Series	30 November 2018 – 2 June 2019; 5 December 2019 – 8 March 2020	Various	9	New Zealand; Fiji; South Africa; Australia; Samoa; Canada; Scotland; Kenya; Wales
2019 Oceania Sevens (Note: A men's qualification tournament scheduled for April 2022 was abandoned owing to COVID-19-related logistical challenges, so the (pre-pandemic) 2019 championship was designated as the Oceania qualifier.)	7–9 November 2019	(Fiji) Suva	1	Tonga
2021 Asia Sevens	19–20 November 2021	(United Arab Emirates) Dubai	2	Sri Lanka; Malaysia
2022 RAN Sevens Qualifiers	23–24 April 2022	(The Bahamas) Nassau	1	Jamaica
2022 Africa Men's Sevens	23–24 April 2022	(Uganda) Kampala	2	Uganda; Zambia
Total			16	

=== Women ===
Eight nations qualified for the women's tournament at the 2022 Commonwealth Games:

- The host nation.
- The top two nations in combined standings from the 2018–19 and 2019–20 World Rugby Women's Sevens Series, excluding the host nation.
- The top North American nation in the aforementioned standings, or the second nation if the former makes the top two outright (excluding the host nation).
- The top nation not yet qualified from each of the four regional qualifiers.

Means of qualification	Date	Location	Quotas	Qualified
Host Nation	—N/a	—N/a	1	England
2018–19 & 2019–20; World Rugby Women's Sevens Series	20 October 2018 – 16 June 2019; 5 October 2019 – 2 February 2020	Various	3	New Zealand; Canada; Australia
North America allocation	20 October 2018 – 16 June 2019; 5 October 2019 – 2 February 2020	Various	0 (Note: Canada qualified in the top two outright and were the only RAN Commonwealth nation with ranking points, so the RAN-specific quota place was reallocated to the general standings.)	—
2019 Oceania Women's Sevens (Note: A women's qualification tournament scheduled for April 2022 was abandoned owing to COVID-19-related logistical challenges, so the (pre-pandemic) 2019 championship was designated as the Oceania qualifier.)	7–9 November 2019	(Fiji) Suva	1	Fiji
2021 Europe Women's Sevens (Moscow round)	25–26 June 2021	(Russia) Moscow	1	Scotland
2021 Asia Women's Sevens	19–20 November 2021	(United Arab Emirates) Dubai	1	Sri Lanka
2022 Africa Women's Sevens	29–30 April 2022	(Tunisia) Jemmal	1	South Africa
Total			8	

;Notes

== Competitions ==
Pool A	Pool B	Pool C	Pool D
New Zealand; England; Samoa; Sri Lanka	South Africa; Scotland; Tonga; Malaysia	Fiji; Canada; Wales; Zambia	Australia; Kenya; Uganda; Jamaica

Pool A	Pool B
New Zealand; Canada; England; Sri Lanka	Australia; Fiji; Scotland; South Africa
