= Donelle Snyders =

South African rugby sevens player

- Born: 8 April 2001 (age 25)
- Height: 169 cm (5 ft 7 in)
- Weight: 62 kg (137 lb)

Rugby union career
Senior career
Years	Team	Apps	(Points)
- Western Province
National sevens team
Years	Team		Comps
- South Africa

Donelle Snyders (born 8 April 2001) is a South African rugby sevens player. She competed for South Africa at the 2022 Commonwealth Games in Birmingham where they finished in seventh place.
