= Dilini Kanchana =

- Born: 18 May 1995 (age 31)
- Height: 1.6 m (5 ft 3 in)
- Weight: 62 kg (137 lb)

Rugby union career
National sevens team
Years	Team	Comps
- Sri Lanka

Dilini Kanchana (born 18 May 1995) is a Sri Lankan rugby sevens player.

Kanchana was named in Sri Lanka's squad for the 2022 Commonwealth Games in Birmingham, they finished eighth overall.
