= Nontuthuko Shongwe =

- Born: 17 November 1995 (age 30)

Rugby union career
National sevens team
Years	Team	Comps
- South Africa

Nontuthuko Shongwe (born 17 November 1995) is a South African rugby sevens player. She competed for South Africa at the 2022 Commonwealth Games in Birmingham where they finished in seventh place.
