= Canada at the 2015 Pan American Games =

- IOC code: CAN
- NOC: Canadian Olympic Committee
- Website: www.olympic.ca

in Toronto, Canada 10–26 July 2015
- Competitors: 723 in 36 sports
- Flag bearer (opening): Mark Oldershaw
- Flag bearer (closing): Kia Nurse
- Officials: Curt Harnett (chef de mission)
- Medals Ranked 2nd: Gold 78 Silver 70 Bronze 71 Total 219

Pan American Games appearances (overview)
- 1955; 1959; 1963; 1967; 1971; 1975; 1979; 1983; 1987; 1991; 1995; 1999; 2003; 2007; 2011; 2015; 2019; 2023

Canada competed in the 2015 Pan American Games in Toronto from July 10 to 26, 2015. As the host nation, the team competed in all 36 sports.

On July 1, 2015, canoer Mark Oldershaw was named the flagbearer of the country at the opening ceremony. A team of 723 athletes competing in all 36 sports represented the country at the games, the largest team Canada sent to any multisport event ever.

== Competitors ==
The following table lists Canada's delegation per sport and gender.

Sport	Men	Women	Total
Archery	3	3	6
Athletics	44	44	88
Badminton	2	4	6
Baseball	24	18	42
Basketball	12	12	24
Beach volleyball	2	2	4
Bowling	2	2	4
Boxing	7	3	10
Canoeing	12	7	19
Cycling	16	14	30
Diving	4	4	8
Equestrian	5	8	13
Fencing	9	9	18
Field hockey	16	16	32
Football (soccer)	18	18	36
Golf	2	1	3
Gymnastics	7	15	22
Handball	15	15	30
Judo	7	6	13
Karate	5	5	10
Modern pentathlon	2	3	5
Racquetball	4	4	8
Roller sports	2	3	5
Rowing	18	8	26
Rugby sevens	12	12	24
Sailing	11	7	18
Shooting	15	9	24
Softball	15	15	30
Squash	3	3	6
Swimming	20	20	40
Synchronized swimming	—N/a	9	9
Table tennis	3	3	6
Taekwondo	4	4	8
Tennis	3	3	6
Triathlon	3	3	6
Volleyball	12	12	24
Water polo	13	13	26
Water skiing	4	1	5
Weightlifting	7	6	13
Wrestling	10	6	16
Total	368	345	723

== Medallists ==
Medal	Name	Sport	Event	Date
Gold	Émilie Fournel; Kathleen Fraser; Michelle Russell; Hannah Vaughan	Canoeing	Women's K-4 500 m	July 11
Gold	Jacqueline Simoneau; Karine Thomas	Synchronized swimming	Women's duet	July 11
Gold	Jacqueline Simoneau; Karine Thomas; Gabriella Brisson; Annabelle Frappier; Claudia Holzner; Lisa Mikelberg; Marie-Lou Morin; Samantha Nealon; Lisa Sanders	Synchronized swimming	Women's team	July 11
Gold	Tory Nyhaug	Cycling	Men's BMX	July 11
Gold	Emily Batty	Cycling	Women's cross-country	July 12
Gold	Raphaël Gagné	Cycling	Men's cross-country	July 12
Gold	Lynda Kiejko	Shooting	Women's 10 metre air pistol	July 12
Gold	Jennifer Abel	Diving	Women's 3m Springboard	July 12
Gold	Admir Cejvanovic; Justin Douglas; Sean Duke; Mike Fuailefau; Lucas Hammond; Nathan Hirayama; Harry Jones; Phil Mack; John Moonlight; Matt Mullins; Conor Trainor; Sean White	Rugby	Men's tournament	July 12
Gold	Britt Benn; Hannah Darling; Magali Harvey; Sara Kaljuvee; Jen Kish; Ghislaine Landry; Kayla Moleschi; Karen Paquin; Nadia Popov; Kelly Russell; Ashley Steacy; Natasha Watcham-Roy	Rugby	Women's tournament	July 12
Gold	Kerry Maher-Shaffer; Antje von Seydlitz	Rowing	Women's Double Sculls	July 13
Gold	Kai Langerfeld; Will Crothers; Conlin McCabe; Tim Schrijver	Rowing	Men's Coxless Four	July 13
Gold	Gabriel Beauchesne-Sévigny; Benjamin Russell	Canoeing	Men's C-2 1000 m	July 13
Gold	Meaghan Benfeito; Roseline Filion	Diving	Women's 10m Synchro Platform	July 13
Gold	Amanda Chudoba	Shooting	Women's trap	July 13
Gold	Ellie Black	Gymnastics	All-Around	July 13
Gold	Kelita Zupancic	Judo	Women's 70 kg	July 13
Gold	Mark de Jonge	Canoeing	Men's K-1 200 metres	July 14
Gold	Laurence Vincent-Lapointe	Canoeing	Women's C-1 200 m	July 14
Gold	Julien Bahain; Matthew Buie; Will Dean; Rob Gibson	Rowing	Men's Quadruple Sculls	July 14
Gold	Liz Fenje; Kate Sauks	Rowing	Women's Lightweight Double Sculls	July 14
Gold	Carling Zeeman	Rowing	Women's Single Sculls	July 14
Gold	Chantal van Landeghem	Swimming	Women's 100 metre freestyle	July 14
Gold	Audrey Lacroix	Swimming	Women's 200 metre butterfly	July 14
Gold	Sandrine Mainville; Michele Williams; Katerine Savard; Chantal van Landeghem; Alyson Ackman; Dominique Bouchard	Swimming	Women's 4 × 100 metre freestyle relay	July 14
Gold	Brendan Hodge; Maxwell Lattimer; Nicolas Pratt; Eric Woelfl	Rowing	Men's Lightweight Coxless Four	July 15
Gold	Julien Bahain; Martin Barakso; Will Crothers; Will Dean; Mike Evans; Kai Langerfeld; Conlin McCabe; Tim Schrijver; Jacob Koudys	Rowing	Men's Eight	July 15
Gold	Kate Goodfellow; Kerry Maher-Shaffer; Antje von Seydlitz; Carling Zeeman	Rowing	Quadruple Sculls	July 15
Gold	Lynda Kiejko	Shooting	Women's 25 metre pistol	July 15
Gold	Ellie Black	Gymnastics	Balance beam	July 15
Gold	Ellie Black	Gymnastics	Floor	July 15
Gold	Kierra Smith	Swimming	Women's 200 m breaststroke	July 15
Gold	Hilary Caldwell	Swimming	Women's 200 m backstroke	July 15
Gold	Michelle Li	Badminton	Women's singles	July 16
Gold	Hugo Barrette; Evan Carey; Joseph Veloce	Cycling	Men's team sprint	July 16
Gold	Kate O'Brien; Monique Sullivan	Cycling	Women's team sprint	July 16
Gold	Gabriela Dabrowski; Carol Zhao	Tennis	Women's doubles	July 16
Gold	Genevieve Morrison	Wrestling	Women's 48 kg	July 16
Gold	Monique Sullivan	Cycling	Women's keirin	July 17
Gold	Allison Beveridge; Laura Brown; Jasmin Glaesser; Kirsti Lay	Cycling	Women's team pursuit	July 17
Gold	Shawn Delierre; Andrew Schnell; Graeme Schnell	Squash	Men's team	July 17
Gold	Braxton Stone-Papadopoulos	Wrestling	Women's 63 kg	July 17
Gold	Dorothy Yeats	Wrestling	Women's 69 kg	July 17
Gold	Emily Overholt	Swimming	Women's 400 m freestyle	July 17
Gold	Ryan Cochrane	Swimming	Men's 400 m freestyle	July 17
Gold	Ryan Boland; Sean Cleary; Jeff Ellsworth; Brad Ezekiel; Ian Fehrman; Jason Hill; Brandon Horn; Paul Koert; Derek Mayson; Steve Mullaley; Mathieu Roy; Jason Sanford; Kevin Schellenberg; Andy Skelton; Ryan Wolfe	Softball	Men's tournament	July 18
Gold	Hugo Barrette	Cycling	Men's sprint	July 18
Gold	Ryan Cochrane	Swimming	Men's 1500 m freestyle	July 18
Gold	Evan Dunfee	Athletics	Men's 20 km walk	July 19
Gold	Jazmyne Denhollander	Canoeing	Women's slalom K-1	July 19
Gold	Keegan Soehn	Gymnastics	Men's individual	July 19
Gold	Rosannagh MacLennan	Gymnastics	Women's individual	July 19
Gold	Monique Sullivan	Cycling	Women's sprint	July 19
Gold	Andrew Albers; Phillippe Aumont; Shane Dawson; Kellin Deglan; Jeff Francis; Tyson Gillies; Shawn Hill; Jesse Hodges; Sean Jamieson; Brock Kjeldgaard; Jordan Lennerton; Chris Leroux; Kyle Lotzkar; Jared Mortensen; Tyler O'Neill; Pete Orr; Jasvir Rakkar; Scott Richmond; Chris Robinson; Evan Rutckyj; Tim Smith; Skyler Stromsmoe; Rene Tosoni	Baseball	Men's tournament	July 19
Gold	Natalie Achonwa; Miranda Ayim; Nirra Fields; Kim Gaucher; Miah-Marie Langolis; Lizanne Murphy; Kia Nurse; Katherine Plouffe; Michelle Plouffe; Nayo Raincock-Ekunwe; Tamara Tatham; Shona Thorburn	Basketball	Women's tournament	July 20
Gold	Elizabeth Gleadle	Athletics	Women's Javelin throw	July 21
Gold	Shawnacy Barber	Athletics	Men's Pole vault	July 21
Gold	Matthew Hughes	Athletics	Men's 3000 m steeplechase	July 21
Gold	Mohammed Ahmed	Athletics	Men's 10,000 m	July 21
Gold	Hugo Houle	Cycling	Men's road time trial	July 22
Gold	Rusty Malinoski	Water skiing	Men's wakeboard	July 22
Gold	Whitney McClintock	Water skiing	Women's overall	July 22
Gold	Andre De Grasse	Athletics	Men's 100 m	July 22
Gold	Melissa Bishop	Athletics	Women's 800 m	July 22
Gold	Whitney McClintock	Water skiing	Women's slalom	July 23
Gold	Ryan Dodd	Water skiing	Men's jump	July 23
Gold	Tiffany Foster; Eric Lamaze; Ian Millar; Yann Candele	Equestrian	Team jumping	July 23
Gold	François Lavoie; Dan Maclelland	Bowling	Men's doubles	July 23
Gold	Damian Warner	Athletics	Decathlon	July 23
Gold	Andre De Grasse	Athletics	Men's 200 metres	July 24
Gold	Christabel Nettey	Athletics	Women's long jump	July 24
Gold	Arthur Biyarslanov	Boxing	Men's Light welterweight	July 24
Gold	Jasmin Glaesser	Cycling	Women's road race	July 25
Gold	Derek Drouin	Athletics	Men's high jump	July 25
Gold	Alanna Goldie; Kelleigh Ryan; Eleanor Harvey	Fencing	Women's team foil	July 25
Gold	Mandy Bujold	Boxing	Women's Flyweight	July 25
Gold	Caroline Veyre	Boxing	Women's Light welterweight	July 25
Gold	Jenna Caira; Jocelyn Cater; Larissa Franklin; Sara Groenewegen; Megan Gurski; Karissa Hovinga; Joey Lye; Erika Polidori; Kaleigh Rafter; Sara Riske; Jenn Salling; Megan Timpf; Natalie Wideman; Jen Yee	Softball	Women's tournament	July 26
Silver	Ecaterina Guica	Judo	Women's 52 kg	July 11
Silver	Roseline Filion	Diving	Women's 10m Platform	July 11
Silver	Catharine Pendrel	Cycling	Women's cross-country	July 12
Silver	Pamela Ware	Diving	Women's 3m Springboard	July 12
Silver	Antoine Bouchard	Judo	Men's 66 kg	July 12
Silver	Catherine Beauchemin-Pinard	Judo	Women's 57 kg	July 12
Silver	Brittany Fraser; Megan Lane; Belinda Trussell; Chris von Marels	Equestrian	Team dressage	July 12
Silver	Ellie Black; Maegan Chant; Madison Copiak; Isabela Onyshko; Victoria-Kayen Woo	Gymnastics	Team	July 12
Silver	Mark Oldershaw	Canoeing	Men's C-1 1000 m	July 13
Silver	Michelle Russell	Canoeing	Women's K-1 500 m	July 13
Silver	Philippe Gagné; François Imbeau-Dulac	Diving	Men's 3m Synchro	July 13
Silver	Jennifer Abel; Pamela Ware	Diving	Women's 3m Synchro	July 13
Silver	Stéfanie Tremblay	Judo	Women's 63 kg	July 13
Silver	Philippe Gagné; Vincent Riendeau	Diving	Men's 10m Synchro Platform	July 13
Silver	Jason McCoombs	Canoeing	Men's C-1 200 m	July 14
Silver	Michelle Russell	Canoeing	Women's K-1 200 m	July 14
Silver	Andrew Schnell; Graeme Schnell	Squash	Men's doubles	July 14
Silver	Sam Cornett; Nikole Todd	Squash	Women's doubles	July 14
Silver	Marc Deschenes	Judo	Men's 100 kg	July 14
Silver	Krystina Alogbo; Joelle Bekhazi; Carmen Eeggens; Monika Eggens; Shae Fournier; Jessica Gaudreault; Jakie Kohli; Katrina Monton; Dominique Perreault; Christine Robinson; Stephanie Valin; Claire Wright; Emma Wright	Water polo	Women's tournament	July 14
Silver	Santo Condorelli	Swimming	Men's 100 metre freestyle	July 14
Silver	Zack Chetrat	Swimming	Men's 200 metre butterfly	July 14
Silver	Santo Condorelli; Karl Krug; Evan Van Moerkerke; Yuri Kisil; Markus Thormeyer; Stefan Milošević	Swimming	Men's 4 × 100 metre freestyle relay	July 14
Silver	Rob Gibson	Rowing	Men's Single Sculls	July 15
Silver	Philip Bester; Gabriela Dabrowski	Tennis	Mixed doubles	July 15
Silver	Kevin Lytwyn	Gymnastics	Horizontal bar	July 15
Silver	George Kobaladze	Weightlifting	Men's +105 kg	July 15
Silver	Emily Overholt	Swimming	Women's 200 m freestyle	July 15
Silver	Martha McCabe	Swimming	Women's 200 m breaststroke	July 15
Silver	Dominique Bouchard	Swimming	Women's 200 m backstroke	July 15
Silver	Richard Funk	Swimming	Men's 200 m breastroke	July 15
Silver	Rachel Honderich	Badminton	Women's singles	July 16
Silver	Toby Ng; Alex Bruce	Badminton	Mixed doubles	July 16
Silver	Andrew D'Souza	Badminton	Men's singles	July 16
Silver	Noemie Thomas	Swimming	Women's 100 m butterfly	July 16
Silver	Sydney Pickrem	Swimming	Women's 400 m individual medley	July 16
Silver	Luke Reilly	Swimming	Men's 400 metre individual medley	July 16
Silver	Samantha Cornett; Hollie Naughton; Nikki Todd	Squash	Women's team	July 17
Silver	Justina Di Stasio	Wrestling	Women's 75 kg	July 17
Silver	Korey Jarvis	Wrestling	Men's125 kg	July 18
Silver	Arjun Gill	Wrestling	Men's 97 kg	July 18
Silver	Dominique Bouchard; Rachel Nicol; Noemie Thomas; Chantal van Landeghem; Tera van Beilen; Sandrine Mainville	Swimming	Women's 4 × 100 metre medley relay	July 18
Silver	Inaki Gomez	Athletics	Men's 20 km walk	July 19
Silver	Cameron Smedley	Canoeing	Men's slalom C-1	July 19
Silver	David Jarvis; Terry McLaughlin; David Ogden; Donald Andrews	Sailing	Open J-24	July 19
Silver	Luke Ramsay	Sailing	Sunfish	July 19
Silver	Jessica Phoenix	Equestrian	Individual Eventing	July 19
Silver	Kate O'Brien	Cycling	Women's sprint	July 19
Silver	Jasmin Glaesser	Cycling	Women's omnium	July 19
Silver	Patricia Bezzoubenko	Gymnastics	Clubs	July 20
Silver	Maxime Potvin	Taekwondo	Men's 68kg	July 20
Silver	Joseph Polossifakis	Fencing	Men's Sabre	July 20
Silver	Tim Nedow	Athletics	Men's Shot put	July 21
Silver	Alex Genest	Athletics	Men's 3000 m steeplechase	July 21
Silver	Jasmin Glaesser	Cycling	Women's road time trial	July 22
Silver	Jared Llewellyn	Water skiing	Men's overall	July 22
Silver	Sarah Wells	Athletics	Women's 400 m hurdles	July 22
Silver	Jason McClintock	Water skiing	Men's slalom	July 23
Silver	Whitney McClintock	Water skiing	Women's tricks	July 23
Silver	Jaret Llewellyn	Water skiing	Men's tricks	July 23
Silver	Whitney McClintock	Water skiing	Women's jump	July 23
Silver	Shaul Gordon; Joseph Polossifakis; Mark Peros	Fencing	Men's Team Sabre	July 23
Silver	Kathryn Campbell	Karate	Women's 55 kg	July 23
Silver	Nathan Brannen	Athletics	Men's 1500 metres	July 24
Silver	Mike Mason	Athletics	Men's high jump	July 25
Silver	Nicole Sifuentes	Athletics	Women's 1500 metres	July 25
Silver	Jamal Murray; Junior Cadougan; Melvin Ejim; Andrew Nicholson; Carl English; Dillon Brooks; Anthony Bennett; Aaron Doornekamp; Brady Heslip; Daniel Mullings; Kyle Wiltjer; Sim Bhullar	Basketball	Men's tournament	July 25
Silver	Brenden Bissett; David Carter; Taylor Curran; Adam Froese; Matthew Guest; Gabriel Ho-Garcia; David Jameson; Gordon Johnston; Ben Martin; Devohn Noronha-Teixeira; Sukhi Panesar; Mark Pearson; Matthew Sarmento; Iain Smythe; Scott Tupper; Paul Wharton	Field hockey	Men's tournament	July 25
Silver	Camélie Boisvenue	Karate	Women's +68 kg	July 25
Silver	Melissa Armstrong; Amanda Asay; Jessica Bérubé; Niki Boyd; Claire Eccles; Jenna Flannigan; Becky Hartley; Jennifer Gilroy; Kelsey Lalor; Nicole Luchanski; Ella Matteucci; Autumn Mills; Heidi Northcott; Kate Psota; Stéphanie Savoie; Ashley Stephenson; Vanessa Riopel; Bradi Wall	Baseball	Women's tournament	July 26
Bronze	Philippe Gagné	Diving	Men's 3m Springboard	July 11
Bronze	Meaghan Benfeito	Diving	Women's 10m Platform	July 11
Bronze	Arthur Margelidon	Judo	Men's 73 kg	July 12
Bronze	Shawn Delierre	Squash	Men's singles	July 12
Bronze	Samantha Cornett	Squash	Women's singles	July 12
Bronze	Francis Luna-Grenier	Weightlifting	Men's 69 kg	July 12
Bronze	Kristin Bauder; Rosanne DeBoef	Rowing	Women's Coxless Pair	July 13
Bronze	Matthew Buie; Pascal Lussier	Rowing	Men's Double Sculls	July 13
Bronze	Adam van Koeverden	Canoeing	Men's K-1 1000 m	July 13
Bronze	Jordan Belchos	Roller Sports	Men's 10,000 metres points race	July 13
Bronze	Adam van Koeverden	Canoeing	Men's K-1 1000 metres	July 14
Bronze	Mark de Jonge; Pierre-Luc Poulin	Canoeing	Men's K-2 200 m	July 14
Bronze	Chris von Marels	Equestrian	Individual Dressage	July 14
Bronze	Michelle Li; Rachel Honderich	Badminton	Women's doubles	July 14
Bronze	Phyllis Chan; Alex Bruce	Badminton	Women's doubles	July 14
Bronze	Catherine Roberge	Judo	Women's 78 kg	July 14
Bronze	Alec Page	Swimming	Men's 200 metre butterfly	July 14
Bronze	Victoria-Kayen Woo	Gymnastics	Balance beam	July 15
Bronze	Dusan Aleksic; Justin Boyd; Nicolas Constantin-Bicari; John Conway; Kevin Graham; Constantine Kudaba; Jared McElroy; Dusan Radojcic; Robin Randall; Scott Robinson; Alec Taschereau; George Torakis; Oliver Vikalo	Water polo	Men's tournament	July 15
Bronze	Jeremy Bagshaw; Alec Page; Stefan Milošević; Ryan Cochrane; Yuri Kisil; Coleman Allen	Swimming	Men's 4 × 200 metre freestyle relay	July 15
Bronze	Santo Condorelli	Swimming	Men's 100 m butterfly	July 16
Bronze	Katerine Savard	Swimming	Women's 100 m butterfly	July 16
Bronze	Emily Overholt; Katerine Savard; Alyson Ackman; Brittany MacLean; Erika Seltenreich-Hodgson; Tabitha Baumann	Swimming	Women's 4 × 200 metre freestyle relay	July 16
Bronze	Richard Funk	Swimming	Men's 100 m breastroke	July 17
Bronze	Rachel Nicol	Swimming	Women's 100 m breaststroke	July 17
Bronze	Michel Dion	Shooting	Men's 50 metre rifle prone	July 17
Bronze	Haislan Garcia	Wrestling	Men's 65 kg	July 17
Bronze	Jason Lyon	Archery	Individual	July 18
Bronze	Patricia Bezzoubenko	Gymnastics	Individual all-around	July 18
Bronze	Lee Parkhill	Sailing	Men's laser	July 18
Bronze	Tamerlan Tagziev	Wrestling	Men's 86 kg	July 18
Bronze	Sydney Pickrem	Swimming	Women's 200 metre individual medley	July 18
Bronze	Russell Wood; Richard Funk; Santo Condorelli; Yuri Kisil; James Dergousoff; Coleman Allen	Swimming	Men's 4 × 100 metre medley relay	July 18
Bronze	Rachel Hannah	Athletics	Women's marathon	July 18
Bronze	Ben Hayward	Canoeing	Men's slalom K-1	July 19
Bronze	Haley Daniels	Canoeing	Women's slalom C-1	July 19
Bronze	Katrina Cameron; Maya Kojnevikov; Lucinda Nowell; Vanessa Panov; Anjelika Reznik; Victoria Reznik	Gymnastics	Group 5 Ribbons	July 19
Bronze	Colleen Loach; Jessica Phoenix; Waylon Roberts; Kathryn Robinson	Equestrian	Team Eventing	July 19
Bronze	Karen Cockburn	Gymnastics	Women's individual	July 19
Bronze	Hugo Barrette	Cycling	Men's keirin	July 19
Bronze	Adam Jamieson; Sean MacKinnon; Rémi Pelletier-Roy; Ed Veal	Cycling	Men's team pursuit	July 19
Bronze	Katrina Cameron; Maya Kojnevikov; Lucinda Nowell; Vanessa Panov; Anjelika Reznik; Victoria Reznik	Gymnastics	Group 6 Clubs + 2 Hoops	July 20
Bronze	Gabriella Page	Fencing	Women's Sabre	July 20
Bronze	Marko Medjugorac; Pierre-Luc Thériault; Eugene Wang	Table tennis	Men's Team	July 21
Bronze	Alicia Côté; Anqi Luo; Zhang Mo	Table tennis	Women's Team	July 21
Bronze	Hugues Boisvert-Simard	Fencing	Men's Épée	July 21
Bronze	Sultana Frizell	Athletics	Women's Hammer throw	July 21
Bronze	Nikkita Holder	Athletics	Women's 100 m hurdles	July 21
Bronze	Ariane Fortin	Boxing	Light heavyweight	July 21
Bronze	Sean MacKinnon	Cycling	Men's road time trial	July 22
Bronze	Alanna Goldie	Fencing	Women's foil	July 22
Bronze	Marc-Andre Bergeron	Taekwondo	Men's +80kg	July 22
Bronze	Kenny Lally	Boxing	Men's Bantamweight	July 22
Bronze	Samir El Mais	Boxing	Men's Heavyweight	July 22
Bronze	Lanni Marchant	Athletics	Women's 10,000 metres	July 23
Bronze	Jusleen Virk	Karate	Women's 50 kg	July 23
Bronze	Vincent Gagnon; Tim Landeryou	Racquetball	Men's doubles	July 23
Bronze	Thea Culley; Kate Gillis; Hannah Haughn; Danielle Hennig; Karli Johansen; Shanlee Johnston; Sara McManus; Stephanie Norlander; Abigail Raye; Maddie Secco; Natalie Sourisseau; Brienne Stairs; Holly Stewart; Alex Thicke; Kaitlyn Williams; Amanda Woodcroft	Field hockey	Women's tournament	July 24
Bronze	Charles Philibert-Thiboutot	Athletics	Men's 1500 metres	July 24
Bronze	Geneviève Lalonde	Athletics	Women's 3000 metres steeplechase	July 24
Bronze	Patrice Boily-Martineau	Karate	Men's 75 kg	July 24
Bronze	Allison Beveridge	Cycling	Women's road race	July 25
Bronze	Sasha Gollish	Athletics	Women's 1500 metres	July 25
Bronze	Khamica Bingham; Crystal Emmanuel; Phylicia George; Shaina Harrison; Kimberly Hyacinthe; Jellisa Westney	Athletics	Women's 4 × 100 metres relay	July 25
Bronze	Dan MacLelland	Bowling	Men's singles	July 25
Bronze	Guillaume Boivin	Cycling	Men's road race	July 25
Bronze	Frédérique Lambert; Jen Saunders	Racquetball	Women's team	July 25
Bronze	Vincent Gagnon; Mike Green; Coby Iwaasa; Tim Landeryou	Racquetball	Men's team	July 25
Bronze	Eugene Wang	Table tennis	Men's singles	July 25
Bronze	Audrey Jean-Baptiste; Raquel Tjernagel; Taylor Sharpe; Brianne Theisen-Eaton; Sage Watson	Athletics	Women's 4 × 400 metres relay	July 25
Bronze	Nicholas Hoag; Dan Lewis; Steve Marshall; Gord Perrin; TJ Sanders; Gavin Schmitt; Dustin Schneider; Adam Simac; Toontje Van Lankvelt; Rudy Verhoeff; Graham Vigrass; Frederic Winters	Volleyball	Men's tournament	July 26

== Archery ==
Canada will enter a maximum team of three men and three women, for a total of six athletes. The team was officially named on June 16, 2015.

Men

Athlete	Event	Ranking Round		Round of 32	Round of 16	Quarterfinals	Semifinals	Final / BM	Rank
Athlete	Event	Score	Seed	Opposition Score	Opposition Score	Opposition Score	Opposition Score	Opposition Score	Rank
Crispin Duenas	Individual	655	9	Irizarry (PUR); L 5–6	Did not advance				17
Jason Lyon	Individual	647	15	Rivest-Bunster (CAN); W 6–4	Klimitchek (USA); W 6–2	Pineda (COL); W 6–4	Ellison (USA); L 0–6	Garrett (USA); W 6–0	3rd place, bronze medalist(s)
Patrick Rivest-Bunster	Individual	637	18	Lyon (CAN); L 4–6	Did not advance				17
Crispin Duenas; Jason Lyon; Patrick Rivest-Bunster	Team	1939	4	—N/a		Brazil; L 0–6	Did not advance		6

Women

Athlete	Event	Ranking Round		Round of 32	Round of 16	Quarterfinals	Semifinals	Final / BM	Rank
Athlete	Event	Score	Seed	Opposition Score	Opposition Score	Opposition Score	Opposition Score	Opposition Score	Rank
Virginie Chénier	Individual	600	18	Picard (CAN); L 5–6	Did not advance				17
Georcy-Stéphanie Picard	Individual	609	15	Chenier (CAN); W 6–5	Román (MEX); L 0–6	Did not advance			9
Kateri Vrakking	Individual	612	14	Rodriguez (CUB); W 6–5	Lorig (USA); L 5–6	Did not advance			9
Virginie Chénier; Georcy-Stéphanie Picard; Kateri Vrakking	Team	1821	6	—N/a		Colombia; L 1–5	Did not advance		6

== Athletics ==
Canada's final team was announced on June 21, 2015. The team consists of 90 athletes (46 men and 44 women).

Key

- Note–Ranks given for track events are for the entire round
- Q =Qualified for the next round
- q =Qualified for the next round as a fastest loser or, in field events, by position without achieving the qualifying target
- NR =National record
- GR =Games record
- DB =Decathlon Best
- PB =Personal best
- DNF =Did not finish
- NM =No mark
- N/A =Round not applicable for the event
- Bye =Athlete not required to compete in round

Men

Athlete	Event	Round 1		Semifinal		Final	
Athlete	Event	Result	Rank	Result	Rank	Result	Rank
Andre De Grasse	100 m	10.06	1	9.97	1	10.05	1st place, gold medalist(s)
Gavin Smellie	100 m	DSQ		Did not advance			
Andre De Grasse	200 m	20.17	1	20.12	3	19.88	1st place, gold medalist(s)
Brendon Rodney	200 m	20.43	3	20.29	4	Did not advance	
Daniel Harper	400 m	—N/a		47.56	8	Did not advance	
Philip Osei	400 m	—N/a		46.80	6	Did not advance	
Brandon McBride	800 m	—N/a		1:49.65	5	Did not advance	
Anthony Romaniw	800 m	—N/a		1:56.55	7	Did not advance	
Nathan Brannen	1500 m	—N/a				3:41.66	2nd place, silver medalist(s)
Charles Philibert-Thiboutot	1500 m	—N/a				3:41.79	3rd place, bronze medalist(s)
Cameron Levins	5000 m	—N/a				13:48.03	5
Lucas Bruchet	5000 m	—N/a				13:56.09	8
Mohammed Ahmed	10,000 m	—N/a				28:49.96	1st place, gold medalist(s)
Aaron Hendrikx	10,000 m	—N/a				31:27.16	10
Johnathan Cabral	110 m hurdles	—N/a		13.55	3	14.07	8
Sekou Kaba	110 m hurdles	—N/a		13.57	3	Did not advance	
Gregory MacNeill	400 m hurdles	—N/a		52.31	5	Did not advance	
Tait Nystuen	400 m hurdles	—N/a		52.98	7	Did not advance	
Alex Genest	3000 m steeplechase	—N/a				8:33.83	2nd place, silver medalist(s)
Matthew Hughes	3000 m steeplechase	—N/a				8:32.18	1st place, gold medalist(s)
Aaron Brown; Andre De Grasse; Dushane Farrier; Dontae Richards-Kwok; Brendon Rodney; Gavin Smellie	4 × 100 metres relay	—N/a		38.39	3	DSQ	
Nathan George; Daniel Harper; Brandon McBride; Philip Osei; Michael Robertson; Brendon Rodney	4 × 400 metres relay	—N/a		3:05.40	4	Did not advance	
Evan Dunfee	20 km walk	—N/a				1:23:06	1st place, gold medalist(s)
Inaki Gomez	20 km walk	—N/a				1:24:25	2nd place, silver medalist(s)
Creighton Connolly	50 km walk	—N/a				DSQ	
Kip Kangogo	Marathon	—N/a				2:24:02	9
Rob Watson	Marathon	—N/a				2:23:43	8

Field events

Athlete	Event	Qualification		Final	
Athlete	Event	Distance	Position	Distance	Position
Derek Drouin	High jump	—N/a		2.37	1st place, gold medalist(s)
Michael Mason	High jump	—N/a		2.31	2nd place, silver medalist(s)
Jharyl Bowry	Long jump	7.52	8	Did not advance	
Stevens Dorcelus	Long jump	7.40	7	Did not advance	
Tacuma Anderson-Richards	Triple jump	—N/a		15.89	13
Aaron Hernandez	Triple jump	—N/a		NM	
Shawnacy Barber	Pole vault	—N/a		5.80	1st place, gold medalist(s)
Jason Wurster	Pole vault	—N/a		5.00	6
Tim Hendry-Gallagher	Shot put	—N/a		18.24	10
Tim Nedow	Shot put	—N/a		20.53	2nd place, silver medalist(s)
Jim Steacy	Hammer throw	—N/a		69.75	8
Tim Nedow	Discus throw	—N/a		61.49	6
Marc-Antoine Lafrenaye-Dugas	Discus throw	—N/a		55.79	9
Raymond Dykstra	Javelin throw	—N/a		73.73	11
Evan Karakolis	Javelin throw	—N/a		75.09	7

Combined events – Decathlon

Athlete	Event	100 m	LJ	SP	HJ	400 m	110H	DT	PV	JT	1500 m	Final	Rank
Pat Arbour	Result	11.53	7.15	14.56	1.94	53.69	15.15	48.80	4.30	65.03	5:01.70	7502	6
Pat Arbour	Points	746	850	763	749	652	831	845	790	814	550	7502	6
Damian Warner	Result	10.28	7.68	14.36	1.97	47.66	13.44 DB	47.56	4.60	61.53	4:24.73	8659	1st place, gold medalist(s)
Damian Warner	Points	1028	980	750	776	926	1048	820	790	761	780	8659	1st place, gold medalist(s)

Women

Athlete	Event	Round 1		Semifinal		Final	
Athlete	Event	Result	Rank	Result	Rank	Result	Rank
Khamica Bingham	100 m	11.00	2	11.14	4	11.13	6
Crystal Emmanuel	100 m	11.41	5	11.26	5	Did not advance	
Kimberley Hyacinthe	200 m	23.30	3	22.81	4	23.28	6
Raquel Tjernagel	200 m	23.63	5	24.07	7	Did not advance	
Audrey Jean-Baptiste	400 m	—N/a		54.27	5	Did not advance	
Taylor Sharpe	400 m	—N/a		53.82	5	Did not advance	
Melissa Bishop	800 m	—N/a		2:04.51	2	1:59.62	1st place, gold medalist(s)
Jessica Smith	800 m	—N/a		2:03.34	3	2:03.02	5
Sasha Gollish	1500 m	—N/a				4:10.11	3rd place, bronze medalist(s)
Nicole Sifuentes	1500 m	—N/a				4:09.13	2nd place, silver medalist(s)
Jessica O'Connell	5000 m	—N/a				16:08.41	7
Natasha Labeaud	5000 m	—N/a				16:17.40	8
Lanni Marchant	10,000 m	—N/a				32:46.03	3rd place, bronze medalist(s)
Natasha Wodak	10,000 m	—N/a				33:20.14	7
Phylicia George	100 m hurdles	—N/a		13.00	4	13.00	5
Nikkita Holder	100 m hurdles	—N/a		12.96	2	12.85	3rd place, bronze medalist(s)
Sage Watson	400 m hurdles	—N/a		58.36	4	Did not advance	
Sarah Wells	400 m hurdles	—N/a		56.77	2	56.17	2nd place, silver medalist(s)
Geneviève Lalonde	3000 m steeplechase	—N/a				9:53.03	3rd place, bronze medalist(s)
Erin Teschuk	3000 m steeplechase	—N/a				10:02.33	4
Khamica Bingham; Crystal Emmanuel; Shaina Harrison; Phylicia George; Kimberly Hyacinthe; Jellisa Westney	4 × 100 metres relay	—N/a		42.98	2	43.00	3rd place, bronze medalist(s)
Audrey Jean-Baptiste; Raquel Tjernagel; Taylor Sharpe; Brianne Theisen-Eaton; Sage Watson	4 × 400 metres relay	—N/a		3:30.61	3	3:27.74	3rd place, bronze medalist(s)
Rachel Seaman	20 km walk	—N/a				1:32:49	6
Katelynn Ramage	20 km walk	—N/a				1:46:03	12
Rachel Hannah	Marathon	—N/a				2:41:06	3rd place, bronze medalist(s)
Catherine Watkins	Marathon	—N/a				2:51:23	8

Field events

Athlete	Event	Final	
Athlete	Event	Distance	Position
Emma Kimoto	High jump	1.80	9
Alyxandria Treasure	High jump	1.85	7
Christabel Nettey	Long jump	6.90	1st place, gold medalist(s)
Brianne Theisen-Eaton	Long jump	6.64	4
Caroline Ehrhardt	Triple jump	13.08	14
Alicia Smith	Triple jump	12.71	15
Kelsie Ahbe	Pole vault	4.40	5
Mélanie Blouin	Pole vault	4.15	7
Taryn Suttie	Shot put	16.80	10
Julie Labonté	Shot put	15.94	11
Sultana Frizell	Hammer throw	69.51	3rd place, bronze medalist(s)
Heather Steacy	Hammer throw	NM	
Marie-Josée Le Jour	Discus throw	44.67	11
Alanna Kovacs	Discus throw	49.08	10
Melissa Fraser	Javelin throw	52.20	7
Elizabeth Gleadle	Javelin throw	62.83	1st place, gold medalist(s)

Combined events – Heptathlon

Athlete	Event	100H	HJ	SP	200 m	LJ	JT	800 m	Final	Rank
Jillian Drouin	Result	DSQ	1.80	12.80	25.51	DNS	DNS	DNS	DNF	
Jillian Drouin	Points	0	978	714	841	0	0	0	DNF	
Jessica Zelinka	Result	13.12	1.65	13.87	24.47	DNS	DNS	DNS	DNF	
Jessica Zelinka	Points	1106	795	785	936	0	0	0	DNF	

== Badminton ==
Canada as host nation was allowed to enter a full team of eight athletes (four men and four women). However Badminton Canada mistakenly entered athletes Adrian Liu and Derrick Ng in overlapping events, which is a World Badminton Federation rule violation. Badminton Canada launched an appeal, however it was ultimately unsuccessful. Therefore, both athletes had to be withdrawn from the event.

Men

Athlete	Event	First round	Round of 32	Round of 16	Quarterfinals	Semifinals	Final	Rank
Athlete	Event	Opposition Result	Opposition Result	Opposition Result	Opposition Result	Opposition Result	Opposition Result	Rank
Andrew D'Souza	Singles	Macagno (ARG); W (21–9, 21–9)	Henry (JAM); W (16–21, 21–16, 21–11)	Cuba (PER); W (21–8, 21–9)	Pongnairat (USA); W (21–14, 21–10)	Guerrero (CUB); W (13–21, 21–14, 21–13)	Cordón (GUA); L (13–21, 14–21)	2nd place, silver medalist(s)

Women

Athlete	Event	First round	Second round	Third round	Quarterfinals	Semifinals	Final	Rank
Athlete	Event	Opposition Result	Opposition Result	Opposition Result	Opposition Result	Opposition Result	Opposition Result	Rank
Michelle Li	Singles	Bye	Berruezo (ARG); W (21–4, 21–5)	Centeno (ESA); W (21–4, 21–10)	Lo Vicente (BRA); W (21–7, 21–18)	Subandhi (USA); W (21–11, 19–21, 21–15)	Honderich (CAN); W (21–15, 21–9)	1st place, gold medalist(s)
Rachel Honderich	Singles	Bye	Oropeza (CUB); W (21–6, 21–6)	Solis (MEX); W (21–13, 21–9)	Silva (BRA); W (21–16, 21–10)	Wang (USA); W (21–15, 21–11)	Li (CAN); L (15–21, 9–21)	2nd place, silver medalist(s)
Michelle Li; Rachel Honderich	Doubles	Corleto / Paiz (GUA); W (21–4, 21–8)	—N/a		Gaitán / González (MEX); W (21–11, 21–9)	Lee / Obañana (USA); L (11–21, 8–21)	Did not advance	3rd place, bronze medalist(s)
Alex Bruce; Phyllis Chan	Doubles	Chou / Macaya (CHI); W (21–11, 23–21)	—N/a		Winder / Zornoza (PER); W (21–6, 21–10)	Lo Vicente / Lu Vicente (BRA); L (20–22, 14–21)	Did not advance	3rd place, bronze medalist(s)

Mixed

Athlete	Event	First round	Second round	Quarterfinals	Semifinals	Final	Rank
Athlete	Event	Opposition Result	Opposition Result	Opposition Result	Opposition Result	Mixed doubles	Rank
Toby Ng; Alex Bruce	Doubles	Bye	Corpancho / Zornoza (PER); W (21–19, 21–16)	Reyes / Azcuy Perez (CUB); W (21–8, 21–12)	Tjong / Lo Vicente (BRA); W (21–17, 21–16)	Chew / Subandhi (USA); L (9–21, 23–21, 12–21)	2nd place, silver medalist(s)

== Baseball ==
Canada as host nation will automatically enter a men's and women's teams. The men's team will consist of 24 athletes, while the women's team will consist of 18.

=== Men's tournament ===
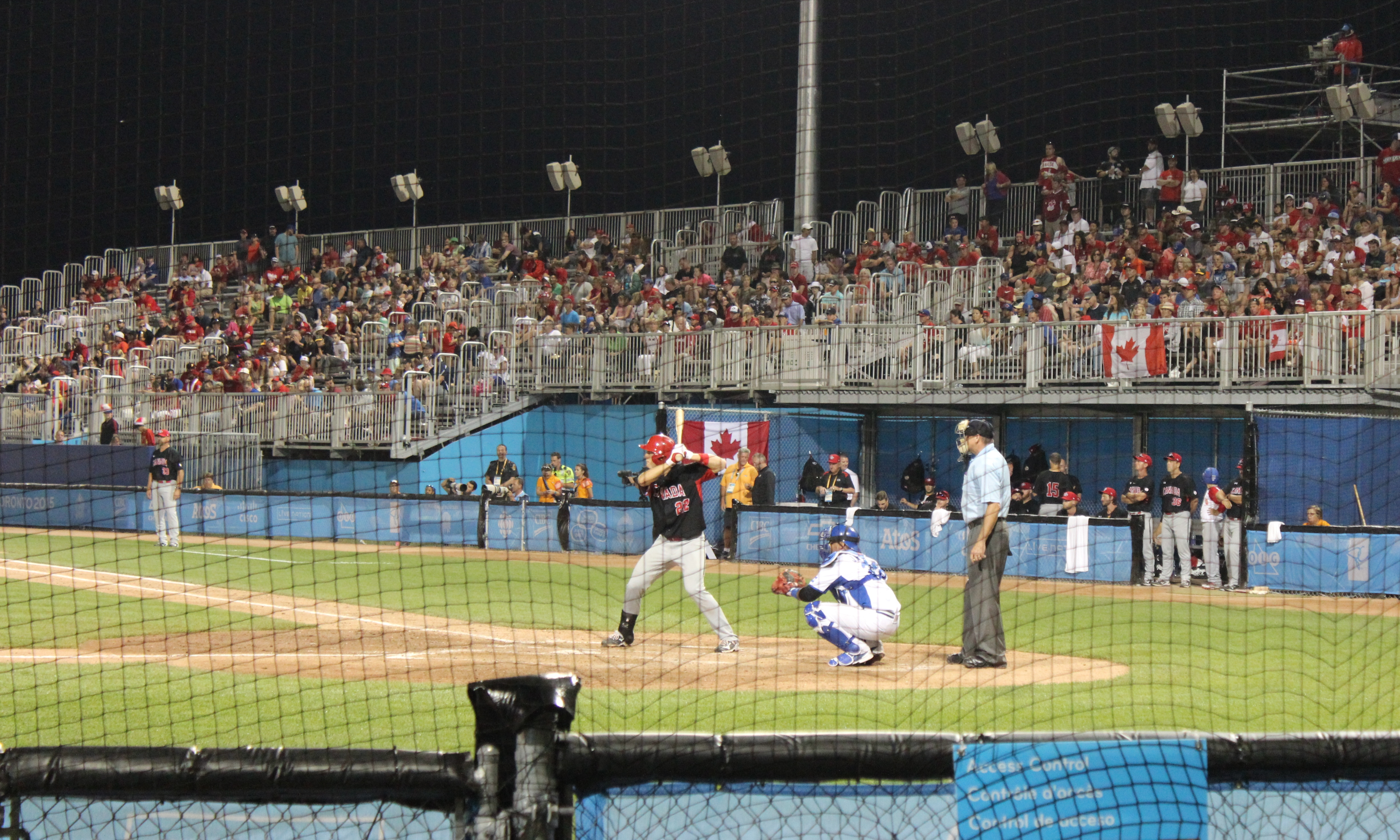
Team Canada Men's baseball team

Canada announced their squad on June 17, 2015. The position of the player is listed in parentheses.

- Andrew Albers (P)
- Phillippe Aumont (P)
- Shane Dawson (P)
- Kellin Deglan (C)
- Bryan Dykxhoorn (P)
- Jeff Francis (P)
- Tyson Gillies (OF)
- Shawn Hill (P)
- Jesse Hodges (INF)
- Sean Jamieson (INF)
- Brock Kjeldgaard (OF)
- Jordan Lennerton (INF)
- Chris Leroux (P)
- Kyle Lotzkar (P)
- Jared Mortensen (P)
- Tyler O'Neill (INF)
- Pete Orr (INF)
- Jasvir Rakkar (P)
- Scott Richmond (P)
- Chris Robinson (C)
- Evan Rutckyj (P)
- Tim Smith (OF)
- Skyler Stromsmoe (INF)
- Rene Tosoni (OF)

Legend: C = Catcher • INF = Infielder • OF = Outfielder • P = Pitcher

Group A

Pos	Team	Pld	W	L	RF	RA	RD	PCT	GB	Qualification
1	Canada	6	5	1	38	15	+23	.833	—	Advance to the semifinals
2	United States	6	4	2	33	22	+11	.667 (Note: In the 3-way tie for 2nd place, all three teams went 1-1 head to head. The 2nd tiebreaker, Team Quality Balance, was used to identify and eliminate the last team in the group (Puerto Rico). The tie between the other two teams was then broken on the basis of the head-to-head result between them (United States defeating Cuba).)	1	Advance to the semifinals
3	Cuba	6	4	2	41	23	+18	.667	1	Advance to the semifinals
4	Puerto Rico	6	4	2	40	44	−4	.667	1	Advance to the semifinals
5	Dominican Republic	6	3	3	30	35	−5	.500	2	
6	Nicaragua	6	1	5	22	43	−21	.167	4	
7	Colombia	6	0	6	22	44	−22	.000	5	

Notes:

11 July 2015; 19:00	Canada	4–1	Dominican Republic	President’s Choice Ajax Pan Am Ballpark – Main Field, Ajax; Attendance: 3,522
11 July 2015; 19:00		Boxscore		President’s Choice Ajax Pan Am Ballpark – Main Field, Ajax; Attendance: 3,522

12 July 2015; 15:30	Canada	10–3	Colombia	President’s Choice Ajax Pan Am Ballpark – Second Field, Ajax; Attendance: 1,257
12 July 2015; 15:30		Boxscore		President’s Choice Ajax Pan Am Ballpark – Second Field, Ajax; Attendance: 1,257

13 July 2015; 19:00	Nicaragua	1–9	Canada	President’s Choice Ajax Pan Am Ballpark – Main Field, Ajax; Attendance: 4,327
13 July 2015; 19:00		Boxscore		President’s Choice Ajax Pan Am Ballpark – Main Field, Ajax; Attendance: 4,327

14 July 2015; 19:00	Cuba	1–3	Canada	President’s Choice Ajax Pan Am Ballpark – Main Field, Ajax; Attendance: 4,638
14 July 2015; 19:00		Boxscore		President’s Choice Ajax Pan Am Ballpark – Main Field, Ajax; Attendance: 4,638

16 July 2015; 19:00	Puerto Rico	4–11	Canada	President’s Choice Ajax Pan Am Ballpark – Main Field, Ajax; Attendance: 4,727
16 July 2015; 19:00		Boxscore		President’s Choice Ajax Pan Am Ballpark – Main Field, Ajax; Attendance: 4,727

17 July 2015; 19:00	Canada	1–4	United States	President’s Choice Ajax Pan Am Ballpark – Main Field, Ajax; Attendance: 4,761
17 July 2015; 19:00		Boxscore		President’s Choice Ajax Pan Am Ballpark – Main Field, Ajax; Attendance: 4,761

Semifinal

18 July 2015; 19:00	Canada	7–1	Puerto Rico	President’s Choice Ajax Pan Am Ballpark – Main Field, Ajax; Attendance: 4,827
18 July 2015; 19:00		Boxscore		President’s Choice Ajax Pan Am Ballpark – Main Field, Ajax; Attendance: 4,827

Gold medal game

19 July 2015; 19:00	(gold) Canada	7–6 (10)	United States (silver)	President’s Choice Ajax Pan Am Ballpark – Main Field, Ajax; Attendance: 5,489
19 July 2015; 19:00		Boxscore		President’s Choice Ajax Pan Am Ballpark – Main Field, Ajax; Attendance: 5,489

=== Women's tournament ===
The Canada women's national baseball team announced their roster for the 2015 Pan American Games on May 17, 2015. The final roster (as of July 19, 2015):

- Melissa Armstrong (P)
- Amanda Asay (P/IF)
- Jessica Bérubé (P)
- Veronika Boyd (OF)
- Claire Eccles (P)
- Jenna Flannigan (OF)
- Rebecca Hartley (OF)
- Jennifer Gilroy (C)
- Kelsey Lalor (OF)
- Nicole Luchanski (IF)
- Daniella Matteucci (OF)
- Autumn Mills (P)
- Heidi Northcott (P)
- Katherine Psota (IF)
- Stéphanie Savoie (C)
- Ashley Stephenson (IF)
- Vanessa Riopel (P)
- Bradi Wall (IF)

Legend: C = Catcher, IF = Infielder, OF = Outfielder, P = Pitcher

Group A

Pos	Team	Pld	W	L	RF	RA	RD	PCT	GB	Qualification
1	United States	4	4	0	33	7	+26	1.000	—	Advanced to the Gold medal match
2	Canada	4	3	1	26	9	+17	.750	1	Advance to the Bronze medal match
3	Venezuela	4	2	2	32	30	+2	.500	2	Advance to the Bronze medal match
4	Puerto Rico	4	1	3	17	27	−10	.250	3	
5	Cuba	4	0	4	8	43	−35	.000	4	

20 July 2015; 19:00	Cuba	1–13	Canada	President’s Choice Ajax Pan Am Ballpark, Ajax; Attendance: 1,602
20 July 2015; 19:00		Boxscore		President’s Choice Ajax Pan Am Ballpark, Ajax; Attendance: 1,602

21 July 2015; 19:00	Venezuela	3–9	Canada	President’s Choice Ajax Pan Am Ballpark, Ajax; Attendance: 1,375
21 July 2015; 19:00		Boxscore		President’s Choice Ajax Pan Am Ballpark, Ajax; Attendance: 1,375

22 July 2015; 15:00	Canada	3–2	Puerto Rico	President’s Choice Ajax Pan Am Ballpark, Ajax; Attendance: 1,775
22 July 2015; 15:00		Boxscore		President’s Choice Ajax Pan Am Ballpark, Ajax; Attendance: 1,775

24 July 2015; 19:00	Canada	1–3	United States	President’s Choice Ajax Pan Am Ballpark, Ajax; Attendance: 3,469
24 July 2015; 19:00		Boxscore		President’s Choice Ajax Pan Am Ballpark, Ajax; Attendance: 3,469

Bronze medal match

25 July 2015; 19:00	(bronze) Venezuela	1–6	Canada	President’s Choice Ajax Pan Am Ballpark, Ajax; Attendance: 2,847
25 July 2015; 19:00		Boxscore		President’s Choice Ajax Pan Am Ballpark, Ajax; Attendance: 2,847

Gold medal match

26 July 2015; 12:00	(silver) Canada	3–11	United States (gold)	President’s Choice Ajax Pan Am Ballpark, Ajax; Attendance: 5,224
26 July 2015; 12:00		Boxscore		President’s Choice Ajax Pan Am Ballpark, Ajax; Attendance: 5,224

== Basketball ==
Canada as host nation will automatically enter a men's and women's teams. Each team will consist of 12 athletes, for a total of 24.

=== Men's tournament ===
The Canada men's national basketball team roster for the 2015 Pan American Games.

Canada men's national basketball team – 2015 Pan American Games roster
Players
Coaches

Pos.	No.	Name	Age – Date of birth	Height	Club
G	4	Murray, Jamal	18 – 23 Feb 1997	1.96 m (6 ft 5 in)	(Canada) Athlete Institute
F	5	Cadougan, Junior	25 – 7 May 1990	1.85 m (6 ft 1 in)	(Italy) Sidigas Avellino
F	6	Ejim, Melvin	24 – 4 Mar 1991	1.98 m (6 ft 6 in)	(Italy) Pallacanestro Virtus
F	7	Nicholson, Andrew	25 – 8 Dec 1989	2.06 m (6 ft 9 in)	(United States) Orlando Magic
G	8	English, Carl	34 – 2 Feb 1981	1.96 m (6 ft 5 in)	(Greece) AEK Athens
F	9	Brooks, Dillon	19 – 22 Jan 1996	2.03 m (6 ft 8 in)	(United States) University of Oregon
F	10	Bennett, Anthony	22 – 14 Mar 1993	2.03 m (6 ft 8 in)	(United States) Minnesota Timberwolves
F	11	Doornekamp, Aaron	29 – 5 Dec 1985	1.98 m (6 ft 6 in)	(Germany) Fraport Skyliners
G	12	Heslip, Brady	25 – 19 Jun 1990	1.88 m (6 ft 2 in)	(Bosnia and Herzegovina) BC Igokea
G	13	Mullings, Daniel	23 – 26 Jul 1991	1.94 m (6 ft 4 in)	(United States) New Mexico State Univ
F	14	Wiltjer, Kyle	22 – 20 Oct 1992	2.08 m (6 ft 10 in)	(United States) Gonzaga University
C	15	Bhullar, Sim	22 – 2 Dec 1992	2.26 m (7 ft 5 in)	(United States) Sacramento Kings

Head coach

- Triano, Jay

Assistant coach(es)

- Vanterpool, David
- Smart, Dave Charles

Legend

- Age – as of 16 July 2015
- Club – before start of Games

Group B

Team	Pld	W	L	PF	PA	PD	Pts	Qualification
Canada	3	3	0	289	247	+42	6	Qualified for the semifinals
Dominican Republic	3	1	2	253	255	−2	4 (Note: 1st tie-breaker: The bottom 3 teams had the exact same head-to-head record of 1–1) (Note: 2nd tie-breaker: Dominican Republic had a +15 head-to-head point differential, Argentina had a +8 head-to-head point differential, and Mexico had a −23 head-to-head point differential.)	Qualified for the semifinals
Argentina	3	1	2	247	244	+3	4	
Mexico	3	1	2	232	275	−43	4	

Notes:

21 July 2015
18:00

Report

Canada	105–88	Dominican Republic
Scoring by quarter: 20–17, 34–20, 22–25, 29–26
Pts: Heslip 24; Rebs: Bennett 10; Asts: Ejim, Doornekamp 4		Pts: Suero 17; Rebs: Delgado 6 Asts: Feliz, Suero, Delgado 2

Ryerson Athletic Centre, Toronto

22 July 2015
18:00

Report

Argentina	83–88	Canada
Scoring by quarter: 24–24, 26–20, 16–15, 17–29
Pts: Campazzo 23; Rebs: Richotti, Delía 5 Asts: Laprovíttola 7		Pts: Nicholson 24; Rebs: Nicholson 12; Asts: Cadougan 4

Ryerson Athletic Centre, Toronto

23 July 2015
18:00

Report

Canada	96–76	Mexico
Scoring by quarter: 27–16, 22–23, 22–18, 25–19
Pts: Heslip 20; Rebs: Nicholson 10; Asts: Cadougan, Murray 2		Pts: Mendez 24; Rebs: Garibay 6 Asts: Giron 4

Ryerson Athletic Centre, Toronto

Semifinal

24 July 2015
18:00

Report

United States	108–111 (OT)	Canada
Scoring by quarter: 23–24, 24–28, 33–22, 17–23, Overtime: 11–14
Pts: Brown 25; Rebs: Randolph 6 Asts: Brown 7		Pts: Nicholson 31; Rebs: Bennett 14; Asts: Murray 6

Ryerson Athletic Centre, Toronto

Gold medal game

25 July 2015
16:30

Report

(gold) Brazil	86–71	Canada (silver)
Scoring by quarter: 26–13, 22–16, 19–25, 19–17
Pts: Lima, Taylor, Hettsheimeir 13; Rebs: Luz 7 Asts: Luz, Benite 7		Pts: Bennett 18; Rebs: Bennett 9 Asts: Doornekamp 4

Ryerson Athletic Centre, Toronto

=== Women' tournament ===
The Canada national team roster for the women's basketball tournament of the 2015 Pan American Games. Canada announced their squad on June 22, 2015.

Canada women's national basketball team – 2015 Pan American Games roster
Players
Coaches

Pos.	No.	Name	Age – Date of birth	Height	Club
G	4	Langlois, Miah-Marie	23 – Sep 21, 1991	1.72 m (5 ft 8 in)	(Russia) Dynamo GUVD
G	5	Nurse, Kia	19 – Feb 22, 1996	1.82 m (6 ft 0 in)	(United States) Connecticut Huskies
G	6	Thorburn, Shona	32 – Aug 7, 1982	1.78 m (5 ft 10 in)	(France) Nantes Rezé Basket
F	7	Raincock-Ekwune, Nayo	23 – Aug 29, 1991	1.88 m (6 ft 2 in)	(Germany) TSV 1880 Wasserburg
F	8	Gaucher, Kim	31 – May 7, 1984	1.82 m (6 ft 0 in)	(France) USO Mondeville
F	9	Ayim, Miranda	27 – May 6, 1988	1.88 m (6 ft 2 in)	(France) Basket Landes
G	10	Fields, Nirra	21 – Dec 3, 1993	1.75 m (5 ft 9 in)	(United States) UCLA Bruins
C	11	Achonwa, Natalie	22 – Nov 22, 1992	1.92 m (6 ft 4 in)	(United States) Indiana Fever
F	12	Murphy, Lizanne	31 – Mar 15, 1984	1.84 m (6 ft 0 in)	(France) Union Féminine Angers Basket 49
F	13	Tatham, Tamara	29 – Aug 19, 1985	1.85 m (6 ft 1 in)	(Slovakia) Piestanske Cajky
C	14	Plouffe, Katherine	22 – Sep 15, 1992	1.90 m (6 ft 3 in)	(France) Nantes Rezé Basket
F	15	Plouffe, Michelle	22 – Sep 15, 1992	1.91 m (6 ft 3 in)	(France) USO Mondeville

Head coach

- Lisa Thomaidis

Assistant coach(es)

- Shawnee Harle
- Bev Smith

Legend

- Age – as of 15 July 2015
- Club – before start of Games

Group B

Team	Pld	W	L	PF	PA	PD	Pts	Qualification
Canada	3	3	0	245	164	+81	6	Qualified for the semifinals
Cuba	3	2	1	209	188	+21	5	Qualified for the semifinals
Argentina	3	1	2	200	209	−9	4	
Venezuela	3	0	3	168	261	−93	3	

16 July 2015
18:00

Report

Canada	101–38	Venezuela
Scoring by quarter: 23–8, 25–11, 29–16, 24–3
Pts: Murphy 15; Rebs: Murphy 9 Asts: Langlois 6		Pts: Silva Serrano 13; Rebs: Perez Abreu 5 Asts: Garate Martinez 2

Ryerson Athletic Centre, Toronto

17 July 2015
18:00

Report

Argentina	58–73	Canada
Scoring by quarter: 6–19, 15–9, 23–19, 14–26
Pts: Boquete, Gretter, Thomas Diaz 8 Rebs: Gretter, Pavón, Thomas Diaz 3 Asts: four players 1		Pts: Ayim, Tatham 12; Rebs: Langlois 6 Asts: four players 2

Ryerson Athletic Centre, Toronto

18 July 2015
18:00

Report

Canada	71–68	Cuba
Scoring by quarter: 20–18, 20–17, 20–13, 11–20
Pts: Achonwa 15; Rebs: Achonwa 7 Asts: Langlois, Tatham 4		Pts: Gelis 18; Rebs: Noblet 9 Asts: Casanova, Gelis 3

Ryerson Athletic Centre, Toronto

Semifinal

19 July 2015
18:00

Report

Brazil	63–91	Canada
Scoring by quarter: 9–22, 12–13, 18–33, 24–23
Pts: Macedo 16; Rebs: Macedo 11; Asts: Costa 4		Pts: Fields 15; Rebs: K Plouffe 10; Asts: Thorburn 8

Ryerson Athletic Centre, Toronto

Gold medal game

20 July 2015
20:45

Report

(silver) United States	73–81	Canada (gold)
Scoring by quarter: 23–13, 13–23, 15–26, 22–19
Pts: Stewart 17; Rebs: Stewart 11; Asts: Jefferson 2		Pts: Nurse 33; Rebs: Fields 7 Asts: Nurse, Tatham 3

Ryerson Athletic Centre, Toronto

== Beach volleyball ==
Canada qualified a men's and's women's pairs, by virtue of being the host nation. The team was officially named on June 18, 2015.

Athletes	Event	Preliminary round			Quarterfinals	Semifinals	Finals	Rank
Athletes	Event	Opposition Score	Opposition Score	Opposition Score	Opposition Score	Opposition Score	Opposition Score	Rank
Josh Binstock; Sam Schachter	Men's tournament	(Nicaragua) Lopez/Mora; W 2-1 (21-14, 16–21, 15–10)	(Guatemala) Garcia Bentancourt/Recinos Ocana; W 2-0 (21-9, 21–9)	(Uruguay) Cairus/Vieyto; W 2-0 (21-12, 21–19)	(Mexico) Ontiveros/Virgen; L 0-2 (19-21, 24–26)	(Argentina) Capogrosso/Mehamed; L DNS-2	(Puerto Rico) Haddock/Rodríguez; L DNS-2	8
Melissa Humana-Paredes; Taylor Pischke	Women's tournament	(Cayman Islands) Powery/Smith-Johnson; W 2-0 (21-8, 21–10)	(Puerto Rico) Bernier Colon/Torruella; W 2-0 (21-16, 21–15)	(Uruguay) Gómez/Nieto; W 2-0 (21-15, 21–14)	(Costa Rica) Alfaro/Cope; W 2-0 (21-12, 21–12)	(Cuba) Flores/Martinez; L 1-2 (18-21, 21–17, 7–15)	(Brazil) Horta/Maestrini; L 0-2 (9-21, 14–21)	4

== Boxing ==
Canada as host nation was allowed to enter five men and one woman automatically. Canada later qualified two more men and two women at the qualification tournament held in June 2015. Canada's team thus consists of seven men and three women, for a total of ten boxers.

Men

Athlete	Event	Preliminaries	Quarterfinals	Semifinals	Final	Rank
Athlete	Event	Opposition Result	Opposition Result	Opposition Result	Opposition Result	Rank
P.G.Tondo	Light flyweight	Rivas (VEN); L 0–3	Did not advance			9
Kenny Lally	Bantamweight	—N/a	Padilla (ECU); W 2–1	Cruz (CUB); L 0–3	Did not advance	3rd place, bronze medalist(s)
Arthur Biyarslanov	Light Welterweight	—N/a	Gimenez (ARG); W 3–0	Arcon (VEN); W 3–0	Toledo (CUB); W 2–1	1st place, gold medalist(s)
Sassan Haghigat-Joo	Welterweight	Custodio (BRA); L 1–2	Did not advance			9
Clovis Drolet	Middleweight	Ramirez (CRC); L 1–2	Did not advance			9
Samir El Mais	Heavyweight	—N/a	Goncalves (BRA); W 2–1	Julio (COL); L WO	Did not advance	3rd place, bronze medalist(s)
Simon Kean	Super Heavyweight	—N/a	Awesome (USA); L 1–2	Did not advance		5

Women

Athlete	Event	Quarterfinals	Semifinals	Final	Rank
Athlete	Event	Opposition Result	Opposition Result	Opposition Result	Rank
Mandy Bujold	Flyweight	Valdivia (PER); W 3–0	Valencia (COL); W 2–0	Esparza (USA); W 2–1	1st place, gold medalist(s)
Caroline Veyre	Light welterweight	Tapia (PUR); W 2–1	Sena (DOM); W 2–0	Sánchez (ARG); W 2–0	1st place, gold medalist(s)
Ariane Fortin	Light heavyweight	Carmona (VEN); W 3–0	Guillén (DOM); L 0–2	Did not advance	3rd place, bronze medalist(s)

== Bowling ==
Canada as host nation is permitted to enter a full team of four athletes (two men and two women). The team was named on April 7, 2015. During the men's doubles event Lavoie scored a perfect game in the fifth round, the first in Pan American Games history.

Singles

Athlete	Event	Qualification															Round robin				Semifinals		Finals
Athlete	Event	Block 1 (Games 1–6)						Block 2 (Games 7–12)						Total	Average	Rank	Total	Average	Grand total	Rank	Semifinals		Finals
Athlete	Event	1	2	3	4	5	6	7	8	9	10	11	12	Total	Average	Rank	Total	Average	Grand total	Rank	Opposition Result	Opposition Result	Rank
François Lavoie	Men's	245	191	267	232	206	209	205	255	213	215	227	229	2694	224.5	3	1695	546.1	4389	6	Did not advance		6
Dan MacLelland	Men's	224	205	226	255	257	238	204	191	235	228	224	212	2699	224.9	2	1787	550.8	4486	1	Monacelli (VEN); L 178-187	Did not advance	3rd place, bronze medalist(s)
Robin Orlikowski	Women's	210	203	201	195	180	224	204	178	169	201	236	158	2359	196.6	14	Did not advance						14
Isabelle Rioux	Women's	191	195	192	215	192	232	183	20256	192	249	171	156	2424	202.0	10	Did not advance						10

Doubles

Athlete	Event	Block 1 (Games 1–6)								Block 2 (Games 7–12)								Grand total	Final rank
Athlete	Event	1	2	3	4	5	6	Total	Average	7	8	9	10	11	12	Total	Average	Grand total	Final rank
François Lavoie; Dan MacLelland	Men's	238	213	173	235	192	245	1296	216.0	268	187	182	199	300	245	2677	223.1	5607	1st place, gold medalist(s)
François Lavoie; Dan MacLelland	Men's	269	289	204	233	214	207	1415	236.0	247	279	289	257	228	214	2930	244.2	5607	1st place, gold medalist(s)
Robin Orlikowski; Isabelle Rioux	Women's	151	174	211	177	214	163	1090	181.7	170	207	218	210	172	247	2314	192.8	4609	8
Robin Orlikowski; Isabelle Rioux	Women's	190	220	173	204	198	182	1167	194.5	220	196	182	160	190	180	2295	191.3	4609	8

== Canoeing ==
=== Slalom ===
Canada as host nation will be allowed to enter boats in each event. A total of four athletes were named to the team on May 25, 2015

Athlete(s)	Event	Preliminary						Semifinal		Final	
Athlete(s)	Event	Run 1	Rank	Run 2	Rank	Best	Rank	Time	Rank	Time	Rank
Cameron Smedley	Men's C-1	95.90	4	91.05	3	91.05	3	101.69	2	94.09	2nd place, silver medalist(s)
Ben Hayward; Cameron Smedley	Men's C-2	105.23	3	DNS	=4	105.23	3	172.00	5	Did not advance	5
Ben Hayward	Men's K-1	88.14	2	86.85	1	86.85	2	86.83	1	92.76	3rd place, bronze medalist(s)
Haley Daniels	Women's C-1	248.62	3	176.69	2	176.69	3	185.24	3	143.65	3rd place, bronze medalist(s)
Jazmyne Denhollander	Women's K-1	100.07	3	105.03	1	100.07	3	115.42	3	97.92	1st place, gold medalist(s)

=== Sprint ===
Canada qualified 15 athletes in the sprint discipline (6 in men's kayak and 4 in women's kayak, 4 in men's canoe and 1 in women's canoe). The team was officially named on June 8, 2015.

Men

Athlete(s)	Event	Heats		Semifinals		Final	
Athlete(s)	Event	Time	Rank	Time	Rank	Time	Rank
Mark de Jonge	K-1 200 m	35.681	1	—N/a		35.733	1st place, gold medalist(s)
Adam van Koeverden	K-1 1000 m	—N/a				3:43.055	3rd place, bronze medalist(s)
Mark de Jonge; Pierre-Luc Poulin	K-2 200 m	—N/a				34.345	3rd place, bronze medalist(s)
Brady Reardon; Andrew Jessop	K-2 1000 m	—N/a				3:30.726	5
Philippe Duchesneau; Andrew Jessop; Pierre-Luc Poulin; Brady Reardon	K-4 1000 m	—N/a				3:03.482	4
Jason McCoombs	C-1 200 m	41.002	1	—N/a		41.333	2nd place, silver medalist(s)
Mark Oldershaw	C-1 1000 m	—N/a				4:09.587	2nd place, silver medalist(s)
Gabriel Beauchesne-Sévigny; Benjamin Russell	C-2 1000 m	—N/a				3:46.316	1st place, gold medalist(s)

Women

Athlete(s)	Event	Heats		Semifinals		Final	
Athlete(s)	Event	Time	Rank	Time	Rank	Time	Rank
Michelle Russell	K-1 200 m	42.960	2	—N/a		44.152	2nd place, silver medalist(s)
Michelle Russell	K-1 500 m	1:53.794	2	—N/a		2:02.381	2nd place, silver medalist(s)
Émilie Fournel; Hannah Vaughan	K-2 500 m	—N/a				1:50.787	4
Émilie Fournel; Kathleen Carole Fraser; Michelle Russell; Hannah Vaughan	K-4 500 m	—N/a				1:36.495	1st place, gold medalist(s)
Laurence Vincent-Lapointe	C-1 200 m	—N/a				49.685	1st place, gold medalist(s)

Qualification Legend: QF =Qualify to final; QS =Qualify to semifinal

== Cycling ==
Canada qualified a full team of 24 athletes (two men and two women in each of mountain biking and BMX, and ten men and six women in road/track cycling). The team was officially named on June 1, 2015.

=== BMX ===
Athlete	Event	Seeding		Quarterfinal		Semifinal		Final	
Athlete	Event	Result	Rank	Points	Rank	Time	Rank	Time	Rank
Jimmy Brown	Men's BMX	37.411	6	18	6	Did not advance			
Tory Nyhaug	Men's BMX	36.113	1	3	1	36.405	1	36.208	1st place, gold medalist(s)
Daina Tuchscherer	Women's BMX	43.440	10	—N/a		14	5	Did not advance	
Amelia Walsh	Women's BMX	43.430	9	—N/a		20	7	Did not advance	

=== Mountain biking ===
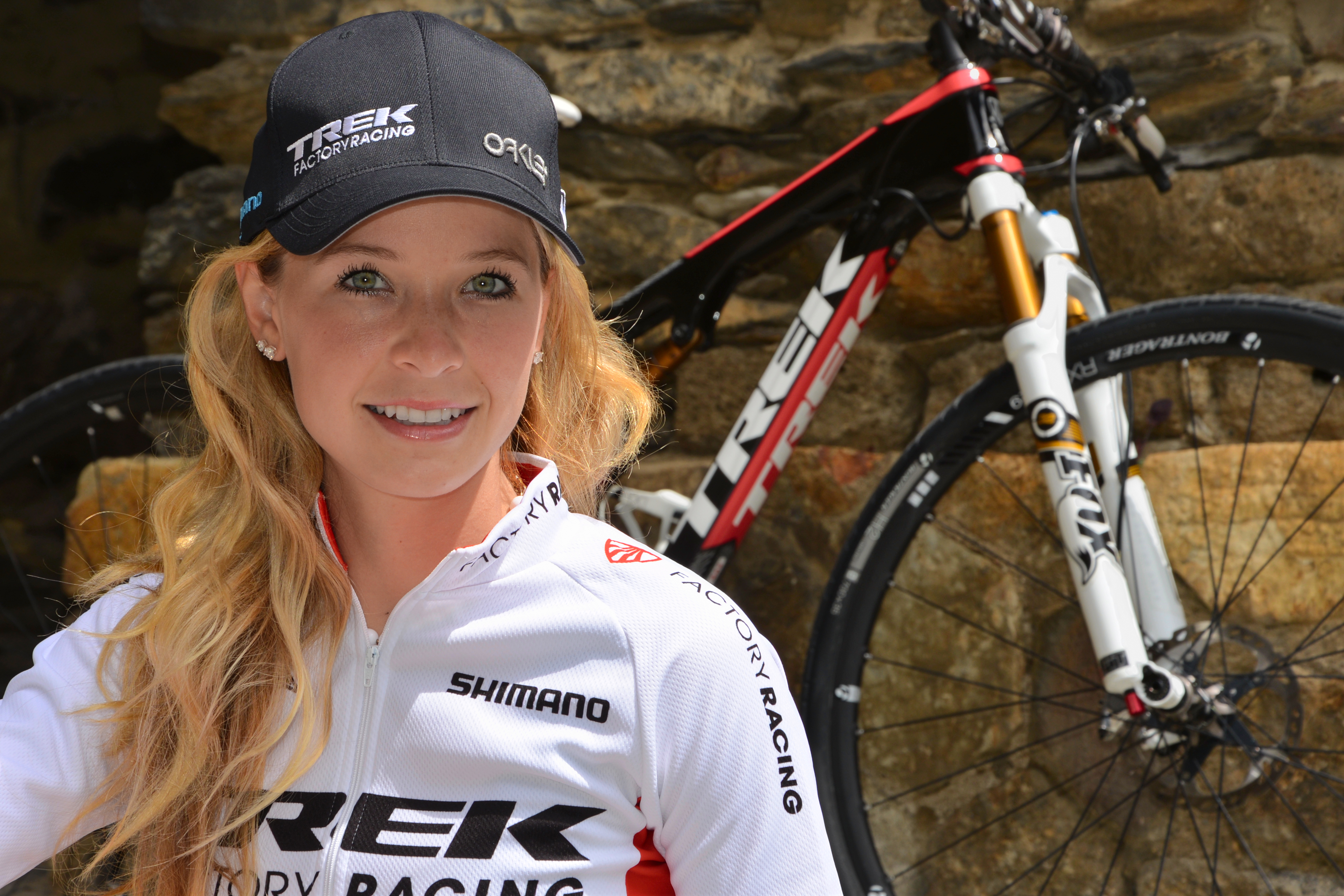
Emily Batty, pictured here in 2013, won gold in the women's mountain biking cross-country event.

Athlete	Event	Time	Rank
Raphaël Gagné	Men's cross-country	1:31:14	1st place, gold medalist(s)
Derek Zandstra	Men's cross-country	1:34:06	4
Emily Batty	Women's cross-country	1:27:13	1st place, gold medalist(s)
Catharine Pendrel	Women's cross-country	1:27:20	2nd place, silver medalist(s)

=== Road ===
Men

Athlete	Event	Final	
Athlete	Event	Time	Rank
Guillaume Boivin	Road race	3:46:26	3rd place, bronze medalist(s)
Hugo Houle	Road race	3:46:36	18
Sean MacKinnon	Road race	DNF	
Rémi Pelletier-Roy	Road race	DNF	
Hugo Houle	Time trial	45:13.48	1st place, gold medalist(s)
Sean MacKinnon	Time trial	46:51.46	3rd place, bronze medalist(s)

Women

Athlete	Event	Final	
Athlete	Event	Time	Rank
Allison Beveridge	Road race	2:07:51	3rd place, bronze medalist(s)
Jasmin Glaesser	Road race	2:07:17	1st place, gold medalist(s)
Kirsti Lay	Road race	2:07:57	29
Laura Brown	Time trial	27:23.32	4
Jasmin Glaesser	Time trial	27:01.31	2nd place, silver medalist(s)

=== Track ===
Keirin

Athlete	Event	1st round	Final
Athlete	Event	Rank	Rank
Monique Sullivan	Women's keirin	1 Q	1st place, gold medalist(s)
Hugo Barrette	Men's keirin	1 Q	3rd place, bronze medalist(s)

Sprint

Athlete	Event	Qualification		Round 1	Repechage 1	Quarterfinals	Semifinals	Final	
Athlete	Event	Time Speed (km/h)	Rank	Opposition Time Speed (km/h)	Opposition Time Speed (km/h)	Opposition Time Speed (km/h)	Opposition Time Speed (km/h)	Opposition Time Speed (km/h)	Rank
Hugo Barrette	Men's sprint	9.978; 72.158	1 Q	Cipriano (BRA); L REL; 60.529	Espinoza (USA); Tjon En Fa (SUR); W 10.747; 66.995	Puerta (COL); W 10.402, W 10.314	Canelón (VEN); W 10.472, W 10.902	Phillip (TTO); W 10.409, W 10.709	1st place, gold medalist(s)
Joseph Veloce	Men's sprint	10.158; 70.880	5 Q	Ramírez (COL); W 10.540; 68.311	Bye	Phillip (TTO); L	Did not advance		6
Kate O'Brien	Women's sprint	11.027	2 Q	Coronel (ARG); W 11.887; 60.570	Bye	García (COL); W 11.539, W 11.745	J Gaviria (COL); W 11.732, W 11.847	Sullivan (CAN); L	2nd place, silver medalist(s)
Monique Sullivan	Women's sprint	10.992 PR	1 Q	Tamirys Leite De Melo (BRA); W 12.291 (58.579)	Bye	Fong (MEX); W 11.907, W 11.812	Gaxiola (MEX); W 11.704, W 11.290	O'Brien (CAN); W 11.687, W 11.416	1st place, gold medalist(s)

Omnium

Athlete	Event	Flying lap		Points race		Elimination race	Individual pursuit		Scratch race	Time trial		Total points	Rank
Athlete	Event	Time	Rank	Points	Rank	Rank	Time	Rank	Rank	Time	Rank	Total points	Rank
Rémi Pelletier-Roy	Men's omnium	13.480	2	20	7	9	4:25.189	1	4	1:04.910	3	192	5
Jasmin Glaesser	Women's omnium	14.702	3	44	2	1	3:34.747	2	5	37.678	7	217	2nd place, silver medalist(s)

Team pursuit and sprint

Athlete	Event	Qualification		First round		Final	
Athlete	Event	Time	Rank	Opponent Time	Rank	Opponent Time	Rank
Adam Jamieson; Sean MacKinnon; Rémi Pelletier-Roy; Ed Veal	Men's team pursuit	4:07.656	3 Q	4:11.731	4	Venezuela; W 4:06.005	3rd place, bronze medalist(s)
Hugo Barrette; Evan Carey; Joseph Veloce	Men's team sprint	44.242	1 Q	—N/a		Venezuela; W 44.241	1st place, gold medalist(s)
Allison Beveridge; Laura Brown; Jasmin Glaesser; Kirsti Lay	Women's team pursuit	4:24.368	1 Q	Cuba; W	1 Q	United States; W 4:19.664 PR	1st place, gold medalist(s)
Kate O'Brien; Monique Sullivan	Women's team sprint	33.584 PR	1 Q	—N/a		Cuba; W 33.959	1st place, gold medalist(s)

== Diving ==
Canada qualified a full team of eight athletes (four men and four women). The team was announced on June 2, 2015.

Men

Athlete	Event	Preliminary		Final	
Athlete	Event	Points	Rank	Points	Rank
François Imbeau-Dulac	Men's 3m Springboard	406.95	2 Q	398.40	6
Philippe Gagné	Men's 3m Springboard	362.80	8 Q	421.20	3rd place, bronze medalist(s)
Maxim Bouchard	Men's 10m Platform	425.15	5	374.00	7
Vincent Riendeau	Men's 10m Platform	430.75	3	419.35	5
Philippe Gagné; François Imbeau-Dulac	Men's 3m Synchro	—N/a		413.37	2nd place, silver medalist(s)
Philippe Gagné; Vincent Riendeau	Men's 10m Synchro Platform	—N/a		404.34	2nd place, silver medalist(s)

Women

Athlete	Event	Preliminary		Final	
Athlete	Event	Points	Rank	Points	Rank
Jennifer Abel	Women's 3m Springboard	353.45	1	384.70	1st place, gold medalist(s)
Pamela Ware	Women's 3m Springboard	309.00	3	326.00	2nd place, silver medalist(s)
Meaghan Benfeito	Women's 10m Platform	315.10	4 Q	357.45	3rd place, bronze medalist(s)
Roseline Filion	Women's 10m Platform	353.80	1 Q	377.60	2nd place, silver medalist(s)
Jennifer Abel; Pamela Ware	Women's 3m Synchro	—N/a		298.23	2nd place, silver medalist(s)
Meaghan Benfeito; Roseline Filion	Women's 10m Synchro Platform	—N/a		316.89	1st place, gold medalist(s)

== Equestrian ==
Canada as host nation is permitted to enter a full team of twelve athletes (four per discipline). The team was officially named on June 13, 2015.

=== Dressage ===
Canada qualified a full dressage team.

Athlete	Horse	Event	Round 1		Round 2		Final			
Athlete	Horse	Event	Score	Rank	Score	Rank	Score	Rank	Total Score	Rank
Brittany Fraser	All In	Individual	76.105	2	76.079	4	76.800	4	152.184	4
Megan Lane	Caravella	Individual	70.900	8	71.392	8	—N/a		142.292	—N/a
Belinda Trussell	Anton	Individual	73.440	6	75.078	5	76.800	4	148.518	4
Chris von Marels	Zilverstar	Individual	75.026	5	76.210	3	79.500	3	151.236	3rd place, bronze medalist(s)
Brittany Fraser; Megan Lane; Belinda Trussell; Chris von Marels	See above	Team	226.071	2	—N/a		228.867	2	454.938	2nd place, silver medalist(s)

=== Eventing ===
Canada qualified a full eventing team.

Athlete	Horse	Event	Dressage		Cross-country		Jumping		Total	
Athlete	Horse	Event	Dressage		Cross-country		Final		Total	
Athlete	Horse	Event	Penalties	Rank	Penalties	Rank	Penalties	Rank	Penalties	Rank
Colleen Loach	Qorry Blue D'Argouges	Individual	51.80	10	0	=1	0	=1	51.80	8
Jessica Phoenix	Pavarotti	Individual	42.10	4	0	=1	0	=1	42.10	2nd place, silver medalist(s)
Waylon Roberts	Bill Owen	Individual	65.10	33	0	=1	4	=19	69.10	17
Kathryn Robinson	Let It Bee	Individual	39.80	2	EL	-	Did not advance		EL	-
Colleen Loach; Jessica Phoenix; Waylon Roberts; Kathryn Robinson	See above	Team	133.70	2	0	=1	4	=4	163.00	3rd place, bronze medalist(s)

=== Jumping ===
Canada qualified a full jumping team.

Individual

Athlete	Horse	Event	Round 1		Round 2		Round 3		Final					
Athlete	Horse	Event	Round 1		Round 2		Round 3		Round A		Round B		Total	
Athlete	Horse	Event	Penalties	Rank	Penalties	Rank	Penalties	Rank	Penalties	Rank	Penalties	Rank	Penalties	Rank
Yann Candele	Showgirl	Individual	0	=1	1	=4	1	=11	8	=12	8	=18	16	19
Tiffany Foster	Tripple X III	Individual	0	=1	7	30	0	=1	Did not advance				7	36
Eric Lamaze	Coco Bongo	Individual	0	=1	4	=13	0	=1	10	22	Did not advance		10	22
Ian Millar	Dixson	Individual	0	=1	1	=4	5	=22	8	=12	5	=15	13	=16

Team

Athlete	Horse	Event	Qualifying round		Final					
Athlete	Horse	Event	Qualifying round		Round 1		Round 2		Total	
Athlete	Horse	Event	Penalties	Rank	Penalties	Rank	Penalties	Rank	Penalties	Rank
Yann Candele; Tiffany Foster; Eric Lamaze; Ian Millar	See above	Team	0	=1	6	=3	1	2	7	1st place, gold medalist(s)

== Fencing ==
Canada as host nation is permitted to enter a full team of 18 fencers (9 men and 9 women). The team was officially named on June 11, 2015.

Individual
Men

Athlete	Event	Pool Round		Round of 16	Quarterfinals	Semifinals	Final	
Athlete	Event	Victories	Seed	Opposition Score	Opposition Score	Opposition Score	Opposition Score	Rank
Hugues Boisvert–Simard	Épée	4	1	Yunior Reytor (CUB); W 15–10	Jhon Rodriguez (COL); W 15–10	José Dominguez (ARG); L 11–15	Did not advance	3rd place, bronze medalist(s)
Maxime Brinck-Croteau	Épée	1	15	Rubén Limardo (VEN); L 0–15	Did not advance			
Anthony Prymack	Foil	3	7	Ruben Silva (CHI); L 12–15	Did not advance			
Maximilien Van Haaster	Foil	4	3	Angelo Justiniano (PUR); W 15–9	Ghislain Perrier (BRA); L 13–15	Did not advance		
Shaul Gordon	Sabre	5	3	Luis Enrique Correa Vila (COL); W 15–7	Eli Dershwitz (USA); L 10–15	Did not advance		
Joseph Polossifakis	Sabre	5	1	Stryker Weller (ISV); W 15–3	Julián Ayala (MEX); W 15–8	Renzo Agresta (BRA); W 15–13	Eli Dershwitz (USA); L 9–15	2nd place, silver medalist(s)

Women

Athlete	Event	Pool Round		Round of 16	Quarterfinals	Semifinals	Final	
Athlete	Event	Victories	Seed	Opposition Score	Opposition Score	Opposition Score	Opposition Score	Rank
Malinka Hoppe	Épée	1	16	Katharine Holmes (USA); L 12–14	Did not advance			
Leonora Mackinnon	Épée	2	10	Yamirka Rodriguez (COL); L 8–15	Did not advance			
Alanna Goldie	Foil	5	2	María Luisa Doig (PER); W 15–2	Elizabeth Hidalgo (COL); W 15–2	Saskia Loretta van Erven Garcia (COL); L 3–15	Did not advance	3rd place, bronze medalist(s)
Kelleigh Ryan	Foil	4	4	Ana Beatriz Bulcão (BRA); W 15–4	Nicole Ross (USA); L 11–10	Did not advance		
Gabriella Page	Sabre	3	9	Marissa Ponich (CAN); W 15–9	Paola Pliego (MEX); W 15–13	Dagmara Wozniak (USA); L 13–15	Did not advance	3rd place, bronze medalist(s)
Marissa Ponich	Sabre	3	8	Gabriella Page (CAN); L 9–15	Did not advance			

Team

Athlete	Event	Quarterfinals	Semifinals/Consolation	Final / BM / PM	
Athlete	Event	Opposition Score	Opposition Score	Opposition Score	Rank
Hugues Boisvert–Simard; Maxime Brinck-Croteau; Jean Lelion	Men's épée	Cuba; L 37–45	Brazil; W 44–41	Mexico; W 45–27	5
Anthony Prymack; Maximilien Van Haaster; Eli Schenkel	Men's foil	Venezuela; L 42–45	Puerto Rico; W 45–21	Colombia; W 45–22	5
Shaul Gordon; Joseph Polossifakis; Mark Peros	Men's Sabre	Colombia; W 45–25	Venezuela; W 45–40	United States; L 37–45	2nd place, silver medalist(s)
Malinka Hoppe; Leonora Mackinnon; Alexis Rudkovska	Women's épée	Cuba; L 26–45	Colombia; W 45–39	Dominican Republic; W 45–37	5
Alanna Goldie; Kelleigh Ryan; Eleanor Harvey	Women's foil	Argentina; W 45–24	Mexico; W 43–23	United States; W 38–37	1st place, gold medalist(s)
Gabriella Page; Marissa Ponich; Pamela Brind'Amour	Women's sabre	Cuba; L 39–45	El Salvador; W 45–32	Brazil; W 45–38	5

== Field hockey ==
As host nation Canada an automatic berth in both the men's and women's tournaments, for a total of 32 athletes (16 men and 16 women).

=== Men's tournament ===
Canada announced their squad on June 25, 2015.

- Brenden Bissett
- David Carter
- Taylor Curran
- Adam Froese
- Matthew Guest
- Gabriel Ho-Garcia
- David Jameson
- Gordon Johnston
- Ben Martin
- Devohn Noronha-Teixeira
- Sukhi Panesar
- Mark Pearson
- Matthew Sarmento
- Iain Smythe
- Scott Tupper
- Paul Wharton

Pool B

Pos	Team	Pld	W	D	L	GF	GA	GD	Pts	Qualification
1	Canada (H)	3	3	0	0	18	2	+16	9	Quarter-finals
2	Chile	3	2	0	1	6	4	+2	6	Quarter-finals
3	Brazil	3	1	0	2	3	12	−9	3	Quarter-finals
4	Mexico	3	0	0	3	3	12	−9	0	Quarter-finals

Source: FIH
Rules for classification: 1) points; 2) matches won; 3) goal difference; 4) goals for; 5) head-to-head result.
(H) Hosts

14 July 2015
19:00

Canada	9–1	Brazil
Bissett 8'; Tupper 17'; Pearson 28', 35'; Ho-Garcia 31'; Froese 34'; Guest 39', 44'; Wharton 50'	Report	Borges 9'

Umpires:
Andres Ledesma (ARG)
Francisco Vázquez (ESP)

16 July 2015
19:00

Chile	0–1	Canada
	Report	Pearson 6'

Umpires:
Federico Garcia (URU)
Saleem Aaron (USA)

18 July 2015
19:00

Canada	8–1	Mexico
Ho-Garcia 6', 14', 52', 54'; Sarmento 31', 47'; Guest 38'; Wharton 55'	Report	Campillo 36'

Umpires:
Federico Garcia (URU)
Andres Ledesma (ARG)

Quarterfinal

21 July 2015
19:30

Canada	3–0	Trinidad and Tobago
Smythe 3'; Sarmento 29'; Tupper 50'	Report

Umpires:
Francisco Vázquez (ESP)
Grant Hundley (USA)

Semifinal

23 July 2015
19:00

Brazil	0–0	Canada
	Report; Penalties
Penalties
Y. van der Heijden (penalty shoot-out scored); P. van der Heijden (penalty shoot-out scored); Felipe Réus (penalty shoot-out missed); Smith (penalty shoot-out scored)	3–5	(penalty shoot-out scored) Pearson; (penalty shoot-out scored) Noronha-Teixeira; (penalty shoot-out scored) Panesar; (penalty shoot-out scored) Johnston; (penalty shoot-out scored) Froese

Umpires:
Andres Ledesma (ARG)
Saleem Aaron (USA)

Gold medal match

25 July 2015
19:00

(gold) Argentina	3–0	Canada (silver)
Ibarra 25'; Vila 33'; Brunet 47'	Report

Umpires:
Francisco Vázquez (ESP)
Federico Garcia (URU)

=== Women's tournament ===
Canada announced their squad on June 25, 2015.

- Thea Culley
- Kate Gillis
- Hannah Haughn
- Danielle Hennig
- Karli Johansen
- Shanlee Johnston
- Sara McManus
- Stephanie Norlander
- Abigail Raye
- Maddie Secco
- Natalie Sourisseau
- Brienne Stairs
- Holly Stewart
- Alex Thicke
- Kaitlyn Williams
- Amanda Woodcroft

Pool A

Pos	Team	Pld	W	D	L	GF	GA	GD	Pts	Qualification
1	Argentina	3	3	0	0	26	0	+26	9	Quarterfinals
2	Canada	3	2	0	1	16	6	+10	6	Quarterfinals
3	Mexico	3	0	1	2	1	14	−13	1	Quarterfinals
4	Dominican Republic	3	0	1	2	2	25	−23	1	Quarterfinals

Source: FIH
Rules for classification: 1) points; 2) goal difference; 3) goals scored; 4) head-to-head result.

13 July 2015
19:00

Canada	12–1	Dominican Republic
Norlander 10', 18', 51'; Gillis 11', 26', 40'; Johansen 14', 43'; Secco 22'; Hennig 38', 55'; Culley 53'	Report	Moronta Perez 26'

Umpires:
Michelle Joubert (RSA)
Nur Hafizah Azman (MAS)

15 July 2015
19:00

Canada	0–5	Argentina
	Report	Barrionuevo 8'; Gomes Fantasia 24'; F. Habif 29'; Albertarrio 38'; Merino 51'

Umpires:
Aleesha Unka (NZL)
Ayanna McClean (TTO)

17 July 2015
19:00

Mexico	0–4	Canada
	Report	Johansen 17'; Culley 26'; Haughn 30', 56'

Umpires:
Verónica Villafañe (ARG)
Nur Hafizah Azman (MAS)

Quarterfinal

20 July 2015
19:30

Canada	2–0	Uruguay
Raye 37'; Johansen 50'	Report

Umpires:
Michelle Joubert (RSA)
Camila Cabargas (CHI)

Semifinal

22 July 2015
19:30

Canada	0–3	United States
	Report	Kolojejchick 9', 47'; Manley 58'

Umpires:
Soledad Iparraguirre (ARG)
Verónica Villafañe (ARG)

Bronze medal match

24 July 2015
17:00

Chile	0–1	Canada (bronze)
	Report	Stairs 51'

Umpires:
Stephanie Judefind (USA)
Suzi Sutton (USA)

2015 Pan American Games Bronze Medal

Canada

== Football (soccer) ==
Canada as host nation will enter both a men's and women's teams, for a total of 36 athletes (18 men and 18 women).

=== Men's tournament ===
Canada announced their squad on June 19, 2015.

Head coach: (Spain) Antonio Floro

No.	Pos.	Player	Date of birth (age)	Club
1	GK	Ricky Gomes	19 June 1993 (aged 22)	(Royal Dutch Football Association) MVV Maastricht
2	DF	Jonathan Grant	15 October 1993 (aged 21)	(Canadian Soccer Association) FC Montreal
3	DF	Kevon Black	11 February 1996 (aged 19)	(Canadian Soccer Association) Toronto FC II
4	DF	Jackson Farmer	3 May 1995 (aged 20)	(Canadian Soccer Association) Whitecaps FC 2
5	DF	Manjrekar James	5 August 1993 (aged 21)	Unattached
6	MF	Chris Mannella	7 June 1994 (aged 21)	(Canadian Soccer Association) Toronto FC
7	FW	Ben Fisk	4 February 1993 (aged 22)	(Royal Spanish Football Federation) Coruxo
8	MF	Manny Aparicio	17 September 1995 (aged 19)	(Canadian Soccer Association) Toronto FC II
9	FW	Caleb Clarke	23 June 1993 (aged 22)	(Canadian Soccer Association) Vancouver Whitecaps FC
10	MF	Keven Alemán	25 March 1994 (aged 21)	(Costa Rican Football Federation) Herediano
11	FW	Molham Babouli	1 February 1993 (aged 22)	(Canadian Soccer Association) Toronto FC II
12	DF	Alex Comsia	1 August 1996 (aged 18)	(United States Soccer Federation) Carolina RailHawks
14	MF	Louis Béland-Goyette	15 September 1995 (aged 19)	(Canadian Soccer Association) FC Montreal
15	FW	Raheem Edwards	17 July 1995 (aged 19)	(Canadian Soccer Association) Toronto FC II
16	FW	Hanson Boakai	28 October 1996 (aged 18)	(Canadian Soccer Association) FC Edmonton
17	DF	Adam Bouchard	12 March 1996 (aged 19)	(Canadian Soccer Association) Toronto FC II
18	MF	Jérémy Gagnon-Laparé	9 March 1995 (aged 20)	(Canadian Soccer Association) Montreal Impact
22	GK	Maxime Crépeau	11 April 1994 (aged 21)	(Canadian Soccer Association) Montreal Impact

Group A

Pos	Team	Pld	W	D	L	GF	GA	GD	Pts	Qualification
1	Brazil	3	2	1	0	11	4	+7	7	Medal round
2	Panama	3	1	2	0	5	4	+1	5	Medal round
3	Peru	3	1	0	2	3	6	−3	3	
4	Canada (H)	3	0	1	2	1	6	−5	1	

Source: Toronto 2015
(H) Hosts
July 12, 2015
20:35

Canada	1–4	Brazil
Babouli 58'	Report	Luciano 7'; Rômulo 38'; Clayton 47'; Erik 89'

Hamilton Pan Am Soccer Stadium, Hamilton
Referee: José Peñaloza (Mexico)

July 16, 2015
20:35

Panama	0–0	Canada
	Report

Hamilton Pan Am Soccer Stadium, Hamilton
Referee: Valdin Legister (Jamaica)

July 20, 2015
20:35

Canada	0–2	Peru
	Report	Rodas 12'; James 68' (o.g.)

Hamilton Pan Am Soccer Stadium, Hamilton
Referee: Adrian Skeete (Barbados)

=== Women's tournament ===
Head coach: (Canada) Daniel Worthington

The following players are on the roster for the 2015 Pan American Games. Stats are accurate through July 11 games against Ecuador.

No.	Pos.	Player	Date of birth (age)	Caps	Goals	Club
1	GK	Stephanie Labbé	10 October 1986 (aged 28)	21	0	(Swedish Football Association) KIF Örebro
18	GK	Kailen Sheridan	16 July 1995 (aged 19)	1	0	(United States Soccer Federation) Clemson University
2	DF	Victoria Pickett	12 August 1996 (aged 18)	1	0	(Canadian Soccer Association) Glen Shields SC
3	DF	Kadeisha Buchanan	5 November 1995 (aged 19)	41	2	(United States Soccer Federation) West Virginia
4	DF	Shelina Zadorsky	24 August 1992 (aged 22)	2	2	(Swedish Football Association) Vittsjo
5	DF	Kinley McNicoll	17 April 1994 (aged 21)	1	0	(United States Soccer Federation) Wisconsin
6	DF	Quinn (Note: Then known as Rebecca Quinn)	11 August 1995 (aged 19)	10	0	(United States Soccer Federation) Duke
7	MF	Danica Wu	13 August 1992 (aged 22)	3	0	(German Football Association) Herforder SV
8	MF	Emma Fletcher	4 February 1995 (aged 20)	1	1	(United States Soccer Federation) Cal Berkeley
9	FW	Sarah Stratikagis	7 March 1999 (aged 16)	0	0	(Canadian Soccer Association) Woodbridge Strikers
10	MF	Ashley Lawrence	11 June 1995 (aged 20)	24	1	(United States Soccer Federation) West Virginia
11	FW	Janine Beckie	20 August 1994 (aged 20)	7	3	(United States Soccer Federation) Texas Tech
12	FW	Nkem Ezurike	19 March 1992 (aged 23)	5	0	(United States Soccer Federation) Boston Breakers
13	MF	Sarah Kinzner	28 August 1997 (aged 17)	1	0	(Canadian Soccer Association) Calgary Foothills
14	FW	Gabrielle Carle	12 August 1998 (aged 16)	1	0	(Canadian Soccer Association) Dynamo de Quebec
15	FW	Marie Levasseur	18 May 1997 (aged 18)	1	0	(Canadian Soccer Association) Dynamo de Quebec
16	DF	Chelsea Stewart	28 April 1990 (aged 25)	44	0	(United States Soccer Federation) Western New York Flash
17	MF	Jessie Fleming	11 March 1998 (aged 17)	19	1	(Canadian Soccer Association) Nor'West SC
19	FW	Nichelle Prince	19 February 1995 (aged 20)	3	1	(United States Soccer Federation) Ohio State

Group B

Pos	Team	Pld	W	D	L	GF	GA	GD	Pts	Qualification
1	Brazil	3	3	0	0	12	1	+11	9	Medal round
2	Canada (H)	3	1	0	2	5	6	−1	3	Medal round
3	Costa Rica	3	1	0	2	2	5	−3	3	
4	Ecuador	3	1	0	2	5	12	−7	3	

Source: Toronto 2015
(H) Hosts
July 11, 2015
21:05

Canada	5–2	Ecuador
Beckie 12', 77'; Zadorsky 44', 48'; Fletcher 79'	Report	Moreira 29', 90'

Hamilton Pan Am Soccer Stadium, Hamilton
Referee: Alondra Arellano (Mexico)

July 15, 2015
20:35

Costa Rica	2–0	Canada
Cruz 60'; Villalobos 74'	Report

Hamilton Pan Am Soccer Stadium, Hamilton
Referee: Tatiana Guzman (Nicaragua)

July 19, 2015
20:35

Canada	0–2	Brazil
	Report	Alves 55'; Cristiane 87'

Hamilton Pan Am Soccer Stadium, Hamilton
Referee: Ekaterina Koroleva (United States)

Semifinal

July 22, 2015
20:35

Colombia	1–0	Canada
Ospina 29'	Report

Hamilton Pan Am Soccer Stadium, Hamilton
Referee: Mirian Leon (El Salvador)

Bronze Medal Match

July 24, 2015
20:35

(bronze) Mexico	2–1	Canada
Ocampo 29'; Mayor 37'	Report	Fleming 88' (pen.)

Hamilton Pan Am Soccer Stadium, Hamilton
Referee: Ekaterina Koroleva (United States)

== Golf ==
As hosts Canada qualified a full team of four athletes (two men and two women). The team was named on May 31, 2015. Brooke Henderson, one of Canada's women entries, withdrew several weeks prior to the Games and was not replaced.

Athlete(s)	Event	Final					
Athlete(s)	Event	Round 1	Round 2	Round 3	Round 4	Total	Rank
Austin Connelly	Men's individual	70	69	70	71	280	5
Garrett Rank	Men's individual	79	72	72	70	293	15
Lorie Kane	Women's individual	79	83	75	74	311	=19
Austin Connelly; Garrett Rank; Lorie Kane	Mixed team	149	152	145	144	590	8

== Gymnastics ==
Canada qualified a full team of twenty-two gymnasts (10 in artistic, eight in rhythmic and four in trampoline). The artistic and rhythmic teams were announced on June 4, 2015.

=== Artistic ===
Canada qualified 10 athletes (five per gender).

Men
Team & Individual Qualification

Athlete	Event	Final							
Athlete	Event	Apparatus						Total	Rank
Athlete	Event	F	PH	R	V	PB	HB	Total	Rank
René Cournoyer	Team	13.300	14.550 Q	14.200	14.350	14.200	14.050	84.650	8 Q
Ken Ikeda	Team		12.950			14.200	13.800	40.950	51
Kevin Lytwyn	Team	14.500 Q		14.950 Q	13.700	14.650	15.300 Q	73.100	26
Scott Morgan	Team	14.050		14.950	14.950 Q			43.950	47
Hugh Smith	Team	13.600	14.150	14.350	14.800	14.150	11.800	82.850	10 Q
Total	Team	42.150	41.650	44.250	44.100	43.050	43.150	258.350	4

Qualification Legend: Q =Qualified to apparatus final

Individual Finals

Athlete	Event	Apparatus						Total	Rank
Athlete	Event	F	PH	R	V	PB	HB	Total	Rank
René Cournoyer	All-around	13.300	12.500	14.400	13.800	14.000	13.200	81.200	11
René Cournoyer	Pommel Horse	—N/a	13.875	—N/a				13.875	7
Kevin Lytwyn	Floor	14.675	—N/a					14.675	6
Kevin Lytwyn	Rings	—N/a		15.050	—N/a			15.050	7
Kevin Lytwyn	Horizontal Bar	—N/a					15.475	15.475	2nd place, silver medalist(s)
Scott Morgan	Vault	—N/a			14.575	—N/a		14.575	6
Hugh Smith	All-around	14.050	14.250	13.750	15.000	14.250	13.600	84.900	7

Women
Team & Individual Qualification

Athlete	Event	Final					
Athlete	Event	Apparatus				Total	Rank
Athlete	Event	V	UB	BB	F	Total	Rank
Ellie Black	Team	14.400 Q	12.950	14.100 Q	14.200 Q	55.650	6 Q
Maegan Chant	Team	14.250 Q		12.850	13.350	40.450	28
Madison Copiak	Team	13.800	13.800 Q			27.600	47
Isabela Onyshko	Team	14.100	14.300 Q	13.450	13.600	55.450	7 Q
Victoria-Kayen Woo	Team		13.400	13.500 Q	13.400	40.300	29
Total	Team	42.750	41.500	41.050	41.200	166.50	2nd place, silver medalist(s)

Qualification Legend: Q =Qualified to apparatus final

Individual Finals

Athlete	Event	Apparatus				Total	Rank
Athlete	Event	F	V	UB	BB	Total	Rank
Ellie Black	All-around	14.550	14.300	14.950	14.350	58.150	1st place, gold medalist(s)
Ellie Black	Floor	14.400	—N/a			14.400	1st place, gold medalist(s)
Ellie Black	Vault	—N/a	14.087	—N/a		14.087	3rd place, bronze medalist(s)
Ellie Black	Balance beam	—N/a			15.050	15.050	1st place, gold medalist(s)
Maegan Chant	Vault	—N/a	14.062	—N/a		14.062	4
Madison Copiak	Uneven bars	—N/a		13.600	—N/a	13.600	7
Isabela Onyshko	All-around	13.950	13.200	14.000	13.900	55.050	6
Isabela Onyshko	Uneven bars	—N/a		13.325	—N/a	13.325	8
Victoria-Kayen Woo	Balance beam	—N/a			13.650	13.650	3rd place, bronze medalist(s)

=== Rhythmic ===
Canada qualified a full team of eight gymnasts (six in group and two in individual).

Individual

Athlete	Event	Final					
Athlete	Event	Hoop	Ball	Clubs	Ribbon	Total	Rank
Patricia Bezzoubenko	Individual all-around	13.450	15.933	16.083	14.933	60.399	3rd place, bronze medalist(s)
Patricia Bezzoubenko	Ball	—N/a	14.283	—N/a		14.283	7
Patricia Bezzoubenko	Club	—N/a		15.933	—N/a	15.933	2nd place, silver medalist(s)
Patricia Bezzoubenko	Ribbon	—N/a			15.300	15.300	4
Carmen Whelan	Individual all-around	14.958	14.650	14.700	14.483	58.791	6
Carmen Whelan	Hoop	14.633	—N/a			14.633	5
Carmen Whelan	Ball	—N/a	14.817	—N/a		14.817	4
Carmen Whelan	Club	—N/a		14.042	—N/a	14.042	7
Carmen Whelan	Ribbon	—N/a			13.733	13.733	7

Qualification Legend: Q =Qualified to apparatus final

Group

Athletes	Event	Final			
Athletes	Event	5 Ribbons	6 Clubs & 2 Hoops	Total	Rank
Katrina Cameron; Maya Kojnevikov; Lucinda Nowell; Vanessa Panov; Anjelika Reznik; Victoria Reznik	Group all-around	10.117	13.333	23.450	5
Katrina Cameron; Maya Kojnevikov; Lucinda Nowell; Vanessa Panov; Anjelika Reznik; Victoria Reznik	Group 5 Ribbons	12.817	—N/a	12.817	3rd place, bronze medalist(s)
Katrina Cameron; Maya Kojnevikov; Lucinda Nowell; Vanessa Panov; Anjelika Reznik; Victoria Reznik	Group 6 Clubs & 2 Hoops	—N/a	13.709	13.709	3rd place, bronze medalist(s)

=== Trampoline ===
Canada as host nation is permitted to enter a full team of four athletes (two men and two women). The team was named on April 9, 2015.

Athlete	Event	Qualification		Final	
Athlete	Event	Score	Rank	Score	Rank
Jason Burnett	Men's individual	101.560	4	55.090	4
Keegan Soehn	Men's individual	103.870	1	56.405	1st place, gold medalist(s)
Karen Cockburn	Women's individual	97.465	1	51.560	3rd place, bronze medalist(s)
Rosannagh MacLennan	Women's individual	70.265	6	53.560	1st place, gold medalist(s)

== Handball ==
Canada as host nation will automatically enter a men's and women's teams. Each team will consist of 15 athletes, for a total of 30.

=== Men's tournament ===
Canada announced their squad on June 26, 2015.

No.	Pos.	Name	Date of birth (age)	Height	App.	Goals	Club
1	GK	Jonathan Leduc	17 November 1983 (age 42)	1.83 m	40		(Canada) Celtique HBC
2	RW	Geoffroy Bessette	17 September 1982 (age 43)	1.75 m	64		(Canada) CHAC HBC
3	CB	Dan Devlin	25 September 1983 (age 42)	1.78 m	37		(Canada) Edmonton HBC
5	LW	Tyrell Johnston	9 May 1992 (age 34)	1.83 m			(Canada) Edmonton HBC
7	P	Philippe Thibeault	14 February 1991 (age 35)	1.98 m			(Canada) Champlain HBC
8	LB	Alexandre Touzel	1 February 1992 (age 34)	1.84 m			(Canada) Champlain HBC
13	RB	Maxime Godin	16 March 1980 (age 46)	1.93 m			(Canada) CHAC HBC
15	LB	Alexis Bertrand	4 November 1982 (age 43)	1.91 m	62		(Canada) Lévis HBC
16	GK	Lyndon Suvanto	6 December 1991 (age 34)	1.93 m			(Canada) Edmonton HBC
17	LW	Niklas Etter	2 November 1988 (age 37)	1.89 m			(Switzerland) HS Biel
20	LW	Norbert Pavlisin	17 June 1992 (age 34)	1.86 m			(Czech Republic) HK Lovosice
33	P	Olivier Jung	13 February 1988 (age 38)	1.84 m			(France) Sélestat Alsace Handball
41	LB	Mark Alan Walder	22 January 1990 (age 36)	1.94 m			(Germany) HSG Nord-NF
66	CB	Casper Bilton	19 February 1991 (age 35)	1.91 m			(Denmark) AJAX
77	LB	Tim Sartisson	9 February 1995 (age 31)	1.90			(Germany) TUS Ferndorf HBC

Group A

Team	Pld	W	D	L	GF	GA	GD	Pts	Qualification
Brazil	3	3	0	0	120	53	+67	6	Qualified for the semifinals
Uruguay	3	2	0	1	77	78	−1	4	Qualified for the semifinals
Canada	3	1	0	2	62	85	−23	2	
Dominican Republic	3	0	0	3	66	109	−43	0	

July 17; 11:30	Brazil	34–17	Canada	Exhibition Centre – Hall B Referees: Ziñiga, Reyes (CUB)
July 17; 11:30	Pacheco 5	(20–8)	Walder 5	Exhibition Centre – Hall B Referees: Ziñiga, Reyes (CUB)
July 17; 11:30	2× (yellow card) 2× (suspension)	report	1× (yellow card) 3× (suspension)	Exhibition Centre – Hall B Referees: Ziñiga, Reyes (CUB)

July 19; 13:30	Canada	28–25	Dominican Republic	Exhibition Centre – Hall B Referees: Pinto, Menezes (BRA)
July 19; 13:30	Bessette 11	(12–14)	Mateo 9	Exhibition Centre – Hall B Referees: Pinto, Menezes (BRA)
July 19; 13:30	2× (yellow card) 5× (suspension)	report	4× (yellow card) 6× (suspension)	Exhibition Centre – Hall B Referees: Pinto, Menezes (BRA)

July 21; 11:30	Canada	17–26	Uruguay	Exhibition Centre – Hall B Referees: Gjeding, Hansen (DEN)
July 21; 11:30	Sartisson 4	(7–13)	Mendez 7	Exhibition Centre – Hall B Referees: Gjeding, Hansen (DEN)
July 21; 11:30	1× (yellow card) 4× (suspension)	Report	4× (yellow card) 3× (suspension)	Exhibition Centre – Hall B Referees: Gjeding, Hansen (DEN)

=== Women's tournament ===
Canada announced their squad on May 4, 2015.

No.	Pos.	Name	Date of birth (age)	Height	App.	Goals	Club
1	GK	Kimberley Ewanovich	29 April 1986 (age 40)	1.80 m	34		(Norway) Sola HK
2	RW	Nassima Benhacine	12 December 1989 (age 36)	1.57 m	13		(Canada) Celtique MTL HB
3	CB	Emily Routhier	29 March 1994 (age 32)	1.74 m	29		(Canada) Sherbrooke HB
4	RW	Abbey Perry	22 March 1997 (age 29)	1.62 m	11		(Canada) Alberta HB
5	LW	Janel Roggiani	29 September 1995 (age 30)	1.75 m	15		(Canada) Alberta HB
6	RB	Valerie Lochet	21 January 1991 (age 35)	1.60 m	8		(France) Aunis HB
7	RB	Taylor Sterling	15 June 1994 (age 32)	1.69 m	17		(Canada) Alberta HB
8	LW	Myriam Laplante	21 February 1991 (age 35)	1.70 m	8		(Canada) Champlain Laprairie
9	LB	Christina Arès-St-Onge	27 April 1992 (age 34)	1.70 m	6		(Canada) Granby HB
10	CB	Brenna Sanderson	28 June 1995 (age 31)	1.69 m	17		(Canada) Alberta HB
11	RB	Catherine Poirier	9 October 1989 (age 36)	1.77 m	24		(Canada) Drummondville HB
12	GK	Vassilia Gagnon	5 September 1990 (age 35)	1.70 m	10		(Canada) Celtique MLT HB
13	LB	Kim Barette	16 May 1987 (age 39)	1.80 m	26		(Canada) Champlain Laprairie
15	P	Audrey Marcoux	8 June 1994 (age 32)	1.76 m	29		(Canada) Sherbrooke HB
17	LB	Amanda Desnoyers	2 March 1992 (age 34)	1.77 m	8		(Canada) Champlain Laprairie

Group A

Team	Pld	W	D	L	GF	GA	GD	Pts	Qualification
Brazil	3	3	0	0	120	52	+68	6	Qualified for the Semifinals
Mexico	3	2	0	1	83	86	−3	4	Qualified for the Semifinals
Puerto Rico	3	0	1	2	72	98	−26	1	
Canada	3	0	1	2	55	94	−39	1	

July 16; 13:30	Mexico	25–22	Canada	Exhibition Centre – Hall B Referees: Lemes, Sosa (URU)
July 16; 13:30	Aguirre, Saavedra 4	(14–10)	Lochet 5	Exhibition Centre – Hall B Referees: Lemes, Sosa (URU)
July 16; 13:30	3× (yellow card) 4× (suspension)	Report	2× (yellow card) 4× (suspension)	Exhibition Centre – Hall B Referees: Lemes, Sosa (URU)

July 18; 11:30	Canada	12–48	Brazil	Exhibition Centre – Hall B Referees: Zuñiga, Reyes (CUB)
July 18; 11:30	Routhier 6	(5–26)	Nascimento 9	Exhibition Centre – Hall B Referees: Zuñiga, Reyes (CUB)
July 18; 11:30	2× (yellow card) 2× (suspension)	Report	2× (yellow card) 3× (suspension)	Exhibition Centre – Hall B Referees: Zuñiga, Reyes (CUB)

July 20; 11:30	Puerto Rico	21–21	Canada	Exhibition Centre – Hall B Referees: Paolantoni, Zanikian (ARG)
July 20; 11:30	Ceballos 7	(10–7)	Perry 7	Exhibition Centre – Hall B Referees: Paolantoni, Zanikian (ARG)
July 20; 11:30	2× (yellow card) 3× (suspension)	report	2× (yellow card) 5× (suspension)	Exhibition Centre – Hall B Referees: Paolantoni, Zanikian (ARG)

== Judo ==
Canada as host nation is permitted to enter a full team of fourteen judokas (seven men and seven women). The team however contains 13 athletes, the women's over 78 kg event will not be represented. The team was officially announced on June 8, 2015.

Men

Athlete	Event	Preliminaries	Quarterfinals	Semifinals	Repechage	Final / BM	
Athlete	Event	Opposition Result	Opposition Result	Opposition Result	Opposition Result	Opposition Result	Rank
Sergio Pessoa	−60 kg	Abel Montero (DOM); W 1012-0001	Juan Postigos (PER); L 0002-0001	Did not advance	Javier Guédez (VEN); W 0101-0001	Yandry Torres (CUB); L 0102-100	5
Antoine Bouchard	−66 kg	Bye	Fernando González (ARG); W 100-0002	Carlos Tondique (CUB); W 100-000	Bye	Charles Chibana (BRA); L 001-101	2nd place, silver medalist(s)
Arthur Margelidon	−73 kg	Bye	Augusto Miranda (PUR); L 000-0011	Bye	Lwilli Santana (DOM); W 1001-0001	Alex William Pombo Silva (BRA); W 1001-010	3rd place, bronze medalist(s)
Zachary Burt	−81 kg	Rodrigo Idro (CHI); W 1001-0001	Ivan Felipe Silva (CUB); L 000-0101	Did not advance	Yusef Farah (MEX); W 100-000	Pedro Castro (COL); L 000-0102	5
Jonah Burt	−90 kg	Rafael Romo (CHI); L 0002-0013	Did not advance				
Marc Deschênes	−100 kg	Bye	Ajax Tadehara (USA); W 110-000	José Armenteros (CUB); W 1001-010	Bye	Luciano Corrêa (BRA); L 0004-100	2nd place, silver medalist(s)
Martin Rygielski	+100 kg	Ramón Pileta (HON); L 0001-100	Did not advance				

Women

Athlete	Event	Preliminaries	Quarterfinals	Semifinals	Repechage	Final / BM	
Athlete	Event	Opposition Result	Opposition Result	Opposition Result	Opposition Result	Opposition Result	Rank
Erin Morgan	−48 kg	Isandrina Sanchez (DOM); L 000-111	Did not advance				
Ecaterina Guica	−52 kg	Bye		Angelica Delgado (USA); W 100–0001	Bye	Érika Miranda (BRA); L 000-110	2nd place, silver medalist(s)
Catherine Beauchemin-Pinard	−57 kg	Bye	Aliuska Ojeda (CUB); W 100–000	Rafaela Silva (BRA); W 100S1–000	Bye	Marti Malloy (USA); L 0001–0011	2nd place, silver medalist(s)
Stéfanie Tremblay	−63 kg	Gimena Laffeuillade (ARG); W 100–000	Maylin Del Toro (CUB); W 100–0002	Mariana Silva (BRA); W 100–000	Bye	Estefania Garcia (ECU); L 0001-000	2nd place, silver medalist(s)
Kelita Zupancic	−70 kg	Bye	Vanessa Chala (ECU); W 100–0002	Maria Portela (BRA); W 0021–0012	Bye	Onix Cortés (CUB); W 1001–000	1st place, gold medalist(s)
Catherine Roberge	−78 kg	Bye	Diana Chala (ECU); W 000-0002	Kayla Harrison (USA); L 0003-000	Bye	Jacqueline Usnayo (CHI); W 0011-0001	3rd place, bronze medalist(s)

== Karate ==
Canada as host nation, is allowed to enter a full team of ten athletes (five men and five women). The team was announced on June 3, 2015.

Men

Athlete	Event	Round robin				Semifinals	Final	
Athlete	Event	Opposition Result	Opposition Result	Opposition Result	Rank	Opposition Result	Opposition Result	Rank
Leivin Chung	–60 kg	Miyazaki (BRA); L 0–2	Sosa (DOM); W 1–1	Martinez (VEN); L 1–2	3	Did not advance		6
Leirick Chung	–67 kg	Santana (CHI); D 1–1	Noriega (CUB); L 1–8	Pinzas (ARG); L 0–4	4	Did not advance		7
Patrice Boily-Martineau	–75 kg	Landázuri (COL); W 5–3	Gustavo (DOM); D 0–0	Nicastro (VEN); L 2–4	2	Scott (USA); L 0–5	Did not advance	3rd place, bronze medalist(s)
Sarmen Sinani	–84 kg	Acevdeo (CHI); W 8–0	Merino (ESA); L 1–6	Herrera (VEN); L 5–6	3	Did not advance		6
Chris De Sousa Costa	+84 kg	Barbosa (BRA); W 5–3	Castillo (DOM); L 2–9	Mina (ECU); L 4–12	3	Did not advance		5

Women

Athlete	Event	Round robin				Semifinals	Final	
Athlete	Event	Opposition Result≈	Opposition Result	Opposition Result	Rank	Opposition Result	Opposition Result	Rank
Jusleen Virk	–50 kg	Campos (VEN); W 5–0	Huamani (PER); W 3–0	Villanueva (DOM); D 0–0	1	Bruna (CHI); L 1–1	Did not advance	3rd place, bronze medalist(s)
Kathryn Campbell	–55 kg	Navarrete (VEN); W 5–0	Leon (DOM); D 0–0	Kumizaki (BRA); W 2–0	1	Vindrola (PER); W 4–0	Kumizaki (BRA); L 1–1	2nd place, silver medalist(s)
Kamille Desjardins	–61 kg	Factos (ECU); W 3–0	Grande (PER); L 3–4	Diaz (DOM); L 1–3	3	Did not advance		6
Jasmine Landry	–68 kg	Salamanca (CHI); W 1–0	Caballero (MEX); L 2–4	Molina (VEN); L 0–2	3	Did not advance		6
Camélie Boisvenue	+68 kg	Martinez (CUB); D 4–4	Perez (DOM); W 5–2	Dos Santos (BRA); W 4–0	1	Ordaz (VEN); W 1–1	Echevar (ECU); L 3–2	2nd place, silver medalist(s)

== Modern pentathlon ==
Canada qualified a team of 5 athletes (2 men and 3 women). The team was named on May 21, 2015.

Athlete	Event	Fencing (Épée One Touch)			Swimming (200m Freestyle)			Riding (Show Jumping)			Shooting/Running (10 m Air Pistol/3000m)			Total Points	Final Rank
Athlete	Event	Results	Rank	MP Points	Time	Rank	MP Points	Penalties	Rank	MP Points	Time	Rank	MP Points	Total Points	Final Rank
Joshua Riker-Fox	Men's	14-14	16	202	2:10.21	19	310	35	17	265	12:14.51	5	566	1347	11
Garnet Stevens	Men's	12-16	20	186	2:05.91	6	323	7	1	293	13:17.40	16	503	1305	13
Hillary Elliott	Women's	12-9	8	223	2:21.11	12	277	49	18	251	15:14.78	19	386	1138	16
Melanie McCann	Women's	13-8	5	232	2:20.67	11	278	-	2	299	13:38.27	8	482	1291	5
Donna Vakalis	Women's	11-10	9	214	2:22.42	13	273	17	14	276	12:44.83	1	536	1299	4

== Racquetball ==
Canada as host nation will enter a full team of four men and four women for a total of eight athletes. The team was announced on June 17, 2015.

Men

Athlete	Event	Qualifying Round robin				Round of 32	Round of 16	Quarterfinals	Semifinals	Final	Rank
Athlete	Event	Match 1	Match 2	Match 3	Rank	Opposition Result	Opposition Result	Opposition Result	Opposition Result	Opposition Result	Rank
Coby Iwaasa	Singles	Wer (GUA); W 2–0	Rosa (MEX); L 0–2	Moscoso (BOL); L 0–2	3	Rios (ECU); W WO	Bredenbeck (USA); W 2–0	Beltrán (MEX); L 0–2	Did not advance		
Mike Green	Singles	Leon (DOM); W 2–0	Beltrán (MEX); L 1–2	Herrera (COL); L 1–2	3	Cubillos (COL); W 2–1	Keller (BOL); L 1–2	Did not advance			
Vincent Gagnon & Tim Landeryou	Doubles	Rios / Alvarez (ECU); W 2–RET	Allen /Rojas (USA); W 2–0	Fumero /Camacho (CRC); W 2–0	1	—N/a	Bye	Manzuri /Maggi (ARG); W 2–0	Moscoso /Keller (BOL); L 0–2	Did not advance	3rd place, bronze medalist(s)
Vincent Gagnon; Mike Green; Coby Iwaasa; Tim Landeryou	Team	—N/a					Bye	Dominican Republic; W 2–1	United States; L 1–2	Did not advance	3rd place, bronze medalist(s)

Women

Athlete	Event	Qualifying Round robin				Round of 16	Quarterfinals	Semifinals	Final	Rank
Athlete	Event	Match 1	Match 2	Match 3	Rank	Opposition Result	Opposition Result	Opposition Result	Opposition Result	Rank
Frédérique Lambert	Singles	Grisar (CHI); W 2-1	Muñoz (ECU); W 2–0	Vargas (ARG); W 2–0	1	Tobon (GUA); W 2–0	Rajsich (USA); L 1–2	Did not advance		
Jennifer Saunders	Singles	Gomez (COL); W 2–0	Sotomayor (ECU); L 0–2	Tobon (VEN); W 2–1	2	Loma (BOL); L 0–2	Did not advance			
Michèle Morissette & Christine Richardson	Doubles	Tobon / Paredes (VEN); L 0–2	Amaya / Gomez (COL); L 0–2	Loma / Mendez (BOL); L 0–2	4	Grisar / Muñoz (CHI); L 0–2	Did not advance			
Frédérique Lambert; Michèle Morissette; Christine Richardson; Jennifer Saunders	Team	—N/a				Guatemala; W 2–1	Argentina; W 2–0	United States; L 0–2	Did not advance	3rd place, bronze medalist(s)

== Roller sports ==
Canada's roller sports team will consist of five athletes (one in figure, and the maximum of two male and two female in speed). The team was officially announced on June 7, 2015. Canada will not compete in the men's singles figure skating event after no athlete registered to compete in the trials.

=== Figure ===
Athlete	Event	Short Program		Long Program		Total	Rank
Athlete	Event	Result	Rank	Result	Rank	Total	Rank
Kailah Macri	Women's free skating	114.40	4 Q	118.80	4	470.80	4

=== Speed ===
Athlete	Event	Result	
Athlete	Event	Time/Points	Rank
Christopher Fiola	Men's 200 m time trial	17.588	8
Jordan Belchos	Men's 10,000 m points race	9	3rd place, bronze medalist(s)
Morgane Echardour	Women's 200 m time trial	20.993	11
Valérie Maltais	Women's 10,000 m points race	1	7

== Rowing ==
Canada as host nation will be allowed to enter all fourteen events, with a maximum of 26 athletes (18 men and 8 women). The team was announced on June 2, 2015.

Men

Athlete	Event	Heats		Repechage		Final	
Athlete	Event	Time	Rank	Time	Rank	Time	Rank
Rob Gibson	Single Sculls	7.22.77	2	7.19.16	1	7:57.94	2nd place, silver medalist(s)
Matthew Buie; Pascal Lussier	Double Sculls	6:28.87	2	6:43.40	1	6:35.89	3rd place, bronze medalist(s)
Saul Garcia-Alvarez; Mark Henry	Lwt Double Sculls	6:45.47	3	6:54.11	1	6:31.75	5
Julien Bahain; Matthew Buie; Will Dean; Rob Gibson	Quadruple Sculls	5:52.21	1	—N/a		5:42.22	1st place, gold medalist(s)
Martin Barakso; Mike Evans	Coxless Pair	6:39.61	2	7:08.38	1	6:38.99	5
Kai Langerfeld; Will Crothers; Conlin McCabe; Tim Schrijver	Coxless Four	6:18.01	1	—N/a		6:10.80	1st place, gold medalist(s)
Brendan Hodge; Maxwell Lattimer; Nicolas Pratt; Eric Woelfl	Lwt Coxless Four	6:09.58	2	6:29.10	1	6:42.40	1st place, gold medalist(s)
Julien Bahain; Martin Barakso; Will Crothers; Will Dean; Mike Evans; Kai Langerfeld; Conlin McCabe; Tim Schrijver; Jacob Koudys (C)	Eight	5:45.79	1	—N/a		6:07.01	1st place, gold medalist(s)

Women

Athlete	Event	Heats		Repechage		Final	
Athlete	Event	Time	Rank	Time	Rank	Time	Rank
Carling Zeeman	Single Sculls	7:43.27	1	Bye		7:30.86	1st place, gold medalist(s)
Liz Fenje	Lwt Single Sculls	7:55.59	3	8:28.82	1	9:11.22	5
Kerry Maher-Shaffer; Antje von Seydlitz	Double Sculls	7:01.73	1	—N/a		7:13.01	1st place, gold medalist(s)
Liz Fenje; Kate Sauks	Lwt Double Sculls	7:21.43	1	Bye		6:57.23	1st place, gold medalist(s)
Kate Goodfellow; Kerry Maher-Shaffer; Antje von Seydlitz; Carling Zeeman	Quadruple Sculls	6:30.83	1	—N/a		7:07.63	1st place, gold medalist(s)
Kristin Bauder; Rosanne DeBoef	Coxless Pair	7:36.11	2	—N/a		7:34.23	3rd place, bronze medalist(s)

Qualification Legend: FA=Final A (medal); FB=Final B (non-medal); R=Repechage

== Rugby sevens ==
Canada as host nation, has automatically qualified a men's and women's teams for a total of 24 athletes (12 men and 12 women).

=== Men's tournament ===
Canada announced their squad on June 23, 2015.

- Admir Cejvanovic
- Justin Douglas
- Sean Duke
- Mike Fuailefau
- Lucas Hammond
- Nathan Hirayama
- Harry Jones
- Phil Mack
- John Moonlight
- Matt Mullins
- Conor Trainor
- Sean White

Group B

Team	Pld	W	D	L	PF	PA	PD	Pts	Qualification
Argentina	3	3	0	0	81	14	+67	9	Qualified for the quarterfinals
Canada	3	2	0	1	78	35	+43	7	Qualified for the quarterfinals
Brazil	3	1	0	2	52	50	+2	5	Qualified for the quarterfinals
Guyana	3	0	0	3	5	117	−112	3	Qualified for the quarterfinals

11 July 2015
12:17

Canada	45–0	Guyana
	Report

Exhibition Stadium, Toronto

11 July 2015
17:11

Canada	26–14	Brazil
	Report

Exhibition Stadium, Toronto

11 July 2015
19:55

Argentina	21–7	Canada
	Report

Exhibition Stadium, Toronto

Quarterfinal

12 July 2015
11:36

Canada	17–12	Chile
	Report

Exhibition Stadium, Toronto

Semifinal

12 July 2015
16:49

United States	19–26	Canada
	Report

Exhibition Stadium, Toronto

Gold Medal Match

12 July 2015
19:59

(gold) Canada	22–19	Argentina (silver)
	Report

Exhibition Stadium, Toronto

=== Women's tournament ===
Canada announced their squad on June 9, 2015.

- Britt Benn
- Hannah Darling
- Magali Harvey
- Sara Kaljuvee
- Jen Kish
- Ghislaine Landry
- Kayla Moleschi
- Karen Paquin
- Nadia Popov
- Kelly Russell
- Ashley Steacy
- Natasha Watcham-Roy

Team	Pld	W	D	L	PF	PA	PD	Pts	Qualification
Canada	5	5	0	0	230	12	+218	15	Qualified for gold-medal match
United States	5	4	0	1	203	48	+155	13	Qualified for gold-medal match
Brazil	5	3	0	2	115	67	+48	11	Qualified for bronze-medal match
Argentina	5	1	1	3	57	131	−74	8	Qualified for bronze-medal match
Colombia	5	1	1	3	29	148	−119	8	
Mexico	5	0	0	5	24	252	−228	5	

11 July 2015
10:05

Canada	55–0	Colombia
	Report

Exhibition Stadium, Toronto

11 July 2015
13:33

Canada	60–0	Mexico
	Report

Exhibition Stadium, Toronto

11 July 2015
17:55

Canada	36–0	Brazil
	Report

Exhibition Stadium, Toronto

12 July 2015
10:05

Argentina	0–45	Canada
	Report

Exhibition Stadium, Toronto

12 July 2015
13:33

Canada	34–12	United States
	Report

Exhibition Stadium, Toronto

Gold Medal Game

12 July 2015
18:20

(silver) United States	7–55	Canada (gold)
	Report

Exhibition Stadium, Toronto

== Sailing ==
Canada as host nation will enter a full team of 10 boats and 18 athletes. The team was announced on May 22, 2015.

Men

Athlete	Event	Race																	Net Points	Final Rank
Athlete	Event	1	2	3	4	5	6	7	8	9	10	11	12	13	14	15	16	M	Net Points	Final Rank
Zachary Plavsic	Windsurfer (RS:X)	2	~~8~~; ~~OCS~~	5	2	7	5	5	5	6	5	4	5	1	Cancelled			8	60	5
Lee Parkhill	Single-handed Dinghy (Laser)	6	1	1	~~17~~; ~~OCS~~	1	3	2	8	5	8	4	2	—N/a				12	53	3rd place, bronze medalist(s)

Women

Athlete	Event	Race																	Net Points	Final Rank
Athlete	Event	1	2	3	4	5	6	7	8	9	10	11	12	13	14	15	16	M	Net Points	Final Rank
Nikola Girke	Windsurfer (RS:X)	5	6	6	6	6	4	5	6	6	6	~~7~~; ~~OCS~~	5	6	Cancelled			EL	67	6
Brenda Bowskill	Single-handed Dinghy (Laser Radial)	4	4	7	13	8	6	12	3	(14)	5	13	3	—N/a				10	102	5
Danielle Boyd; Erin Rafuse	Women's 49erFX	6	~~7~~; ~~OCS~~	5	5	6	6	5	5	3	6	4	5	6	6	4	4	EL	77	6

Open

Athlete	Event	Race													Net Points	Final Rank
Athlete	Event	1	2	3	4	5	6	7	8	9	10	12	12	M	Net Points	Final Rank
Luke Ramsay	Sunfish	1	1	3	4	7	3	8	3	1	1	~~13~~; ~~OCS~~	3	10	45	2nd place, silver medalist(s)
Evert McLaughlin; Alexandra Damley-Strnad	Snipe	3	3	6	5	(9)	4	8	5	6	7	7	8	6	68	5
Jamie Allen; Jay Deakin; Chantal Léger	Multi-crewed Dinghy (Lightning)	4	5	5	5	5	5	~~8~~; ~~OCS~~	4	3	7	6	3	2	54	5
Daniel Borg; Liana Giovando	Multihull (Hobie 16)	4	4.3; RDG	4	3	7	(8); DSQ	6	1	3	2	5	3	10	52.3	5
Sandy Andrews; David Jarvis; Terry McLaughlin; David Ogden	Keelboat (J/24)	2	1	1	3	2	4	5	2	5	4	2	(6)	8	39	2nd place, silver medalist(s)

== Shooting ==
Canada qualified a maximum team of 25 athletes, however only 24 athletes were selected to the final team (15 men and 9 women).

Key: FPR – Final Pan American Games Record

Men

Athlete	Event	Qualification		Final	
Athlete	Event	Points	Rank	Points	Rank
Allan Harding	10 metre air pistol	559	21	Did not advance	
Mark Hynes	10 metre air pistol	555	25	Did not advance	
Metodi Igorov	25 metre rapid fire pistol	557	9	Did not advance	
Mark Hynes	50 metre pistol	532	12	Did not advance	
Cory Niefer	10 metre air rifle	602.6	18	Did not advance	
Benjamin Taylor	10 metre air rifle	608.4	12	Did not advance	
Michel Dion	50 metre rifle prone	620.5	4	183.8	3rd place, bronze medalist(s)
Gale Stewart	50 metre rifle prone	620.4	5	121.3	6
Michal Dugovic	50 metre rifle three positions	1107	21	Did not advance	
Grzegorz Sych	50 metre rifle three positions	1143	9	Did not advance	
Drew Shaw	Trap	114	5	10	5
Curtis Wennberg	Trap	113	6	11	4
Kabir Dhillon	Double trap	109	12	Did not advance	
Paul Shaw	Double trap	101	17	Did not advance	
David Mylnikov	Skeet	112	21	Did not advance	
Jonathan Weselake	Skeet	114	19	Did not advance	

Women

Athlete	Event	Qualification		Final	
Athlete	Event	Points	Rank	Points	Rank
Lynda Kiejko	10 metre air pistol	375	4	195.7 FPR	1st place, gold medalist(s)
Yanka Vasileva	10 metre air pistol	367	16	Did not advance	
Lynda Kiejko	25 metre pistol	571	4	7	1st place, gold medalist(s)
Lea Wachowich	25 metre pistol	568	8	3	4
Aerial Arthur	10 metre air rifle	400.1	23	Did not advance	
Monica Fyfe	10 metre air rifle	404.2	17	Did not advance	
Sharon Bowes	50 metre rifle three positions	565	14	Did not advance	
Shannon Westlake	50 metre rifle three positions	561	18	Did not advance	
Amanda Chudoba	Trap	60	4	11	1st place, gold medalist(s)
Susan Nattrass	Trap	59	5	9	6

== Softball ==
As host nation Canada is allowed to enter both men's and women's teams. Each team will consist of 15 athletes for a total of 30.

=== Men's tournament ===
Canada announced their squad on June 11, 2015.

- Ryan Boland
- Sean Cleary
- Jeff Ellsworth
- Brad Ezekiel
- Ian Fehrman
- Jason Hill
- Brandon Horn
- Paul Koert
- Derek Mayson
- Steve Mullaley
- Mathieu Roy
- Jason Sanford
- Kevin Schellenberg
- Andy Skelton
- Ryan Wolfe

Group A

Team	Pld	W	L	RF	RA	RD	Qualification
Canada	5	5	0	33	13	+20	Qualified for the semifinals
Argentina	5	3	2	19	15	+4	Qualified for the semifinals
Venezuela	5	3	2	14	10	+4	Qualified for the semifinals
United States	5	2	3	16	10	+6	Qualified for the semifinals
Mexico	5	2	3	16	22	−6	
Dominican Republic	5	0	5	5	33	−28	

12 July 2015; 19:00	Canada	10–5	Mexico	President’s Choice Ajax Pan Am Ballpark, Ajax; Attendance: 1,243
12 July 2015; 19:00		Boxscore		President’s Choice Ajax Pan Am Ballpark, Ajax; Attendance: 1,243

13 July 2015; 19:00	United States	2–3	Canada	President’s Choice Ajax Pan Am Ballpark, Ajax; Attendance: 2,230
13 July 2015; 19:00		Boxscore		President’s Choice Ajax Pan Am Ballpark, Ajax; Attendance: 2,230

14 July 2015; 19:00	Argentina	3–9	Canada	President’s Choice Ajax Pan Am Ballpark, Ajax; Attendance: 2,890
14 July 2015; 19:00		Boxscore		President’s Choice Ajax Pan Am Ballpark, Ajax; Attendance: 2,890

15 July 2015; 19:00	Canada	7–2	Dominican Republic	President’s Choice Ajax Pan Am Ballpark, Ajax; Attendance: 632
15 July 2015; 19:00		Boxscore		President’s Choice Ajax Pan Am Ballpark, Ajax; Attendance: 632

16 July 2015; 16:30	Canada	4–1	Venezuela	President’s Choice Ajax Pan Am Ballpark, Ajax; Attendance: 2,010
16 July 2015; 16:30		Boxscore		President’s Choice Ajax Pan Am Ballpark, Ajax; Attendance: 2,010

17 July 2015; 19:00	Canada	2–0	Argentina	President’s Choice Ajax Pan Am Ballpark, Ajax; Attendance: 1,030
17 July 2015; 19:00		Boxscore		President’s Choice Ajax Pan Am Ballpark, Ajax; Attendance: 1,030

18 July 2015; 15:00	(gold) Canada	2–1	Venezuela (silver)	President’s Choice Ajax Pan Am Ballpark, Ajax; Attendance: 3,030
18 July 2015; 15:00		Boxscore		President’s Choice Ajax Pan Am Ballpark, Ajax; Attendance: 3,030

=== Women's tournament ===
Canada announced their squad on January 16, 2015.

- Jenna Caira
- Jocelyn Cater
- Larissa Franklin
- Sara Groenewegen
- Megan Gurski
- Karissa Hovinga
- Joey Lye
- Erika Polidori
- Kaleigh Rafter
- Sara Riske
- Jenn Salling
- Megan Timpf
- Logan White
- Natalie Wideman
- Jen Yee

Group A

Team	Pld	W	L	RF	RA	RD	Qualification
United States	5	5	0	43	4	+39	Qualified for the semifinals
Canada	5	4	1	21	14	+7	Qualified for the semifinals
Puerto Rico	5	3	2	18	17	+1	Qualified for the semifinals
Brazil	5	2	3	7	19	−12	Qualified for the semifinals
Cuba	5	1	4	10	23	−13	
Dominican Republic	5	0	5	14	36	−22	

19 July 2015; 16:30	Canada	6 – 0	Brazil	President’s Choice Ajax Pan Am Ballpark, Ajax; Attendance: 2,234
19 July 2015; 16:30		Boxscore		President’s Choice Ajax Pan Am Ballpark, Ajax; Attendance: 2,234

20 July 2015; 19:00	Canada	5 – 0	Cuba	President’s Choice Ajax Pan Am Ballpark, Ajax; Attendance: 546
20 July 2015; 19:00		Boxscore		President’s Choice Ajax Pan Am Ballpark, Ajax; Attendance: 546

21 July 2015; 19:00	Canada	0 – 7	United States	President’s Choice Ajax Pan Am Ballpark, Ajax; Attendance: 2,900
21 July 2015; 19:00		Boxscore		President’s Choice Ajax Pan Am Ballpark, Ajax; Attendance: 2,900

22 July 2015; 19:00	Canada	9 – 7	Dominican Republic	President’s Choice Ajax Pan Am Ballpark, Ajax; Attendance: 1,200
22 July 2015; 19:00		Boxscore		President’s Choice Ajax Pan Am Ballpark, Ajax; Attendance: 1,200

23 July 2015; 19:00	Canada	1 – 0	Puerto Rico	President’s Choice Ajax Pan Am Ballpark, Ajax; Attendance: 2,050
23 July 2015; 19:00		Boxscore		President’s Choice Ajax Pan Am Ballpark, Ajax; Attendance: 2,050

Semifinals

24 July 2015; 19:00	United States	5 – 2	Canada	President’s Choice Ajax Pan Am Ballpark, Ajax; Attendance: 2,145
24 July 2015; 19:00		Boxscore		President’s Choice Ajax Pan Am Ballpark, Ajax; Attendance: 2,145

Bronze Medal Game

25 July 2015; 17:00	Canada	7 – 4	Puerto Rico (bronze)	President’s Choice Ajax Pan Am Ballpark, Ajax; Attendance: 2,267
25 July 2015; 17:00		Boxscore		President’s Choice Ajax Pan Am Ballpark, Ajax; Attendance: 2,267

Gold Medal Game

26 July 2015; 11:00	(silver) United States	2 – 4 (8)	Canada (gold)	President’s Choice Ajax Pan Am Ballpark, Ajax; Attendance: 3,000
26 July 2015; 11:00		Boxscore		President’s Choice Ajax Pan Am Ballpark, Ajax; Attendance: 3,000

== Squash ==
Canada as host nation was allowed to enter the maximum team of three men and three women.

Singles and Doubles

Athlete	Event	Round of 32	Round of 16	Quarterfinals	Semifinals	Final	
Athlete	Event	Opposition Result	Opposition Result	Opposition Result	Opposition Result	Opposition Result	Rank
Shawn Delierre	Men's singles	Bye	Seth (GUY); W 3–0	Harrity (USA); W 3–1	Rodríguez (COL); L 0–3	Did not advance	3rd place, bronze medalist(s)
Andrew Schnell	Men's singles	Bye	Pezzota (ARG); L 1–3	Did not advance			9
Andrew Schnell; Graeme Schnell	Men's doubles	—N/a	Jeffrey / Khalil (GUY); W 2–0	Gálvez / Salazar (MEX); W 2–1	Gordon / Hanson (USA); W 2–0	Herrera / Vargas (COL); L 0–2	2nd place, silver medalist(s)
Samantha Cornett	Women's singles	—N/a	Anckermann (GUA); W 3–0	Delgado (CHI); W 3–0	Sobhy (USA); L 1–3	Did not advance	3rd place, bronze medalist(s)
Hollie Naughton	Women's singles	—N/a	Rocha (ARG); W 3–0	Terán (MEX); L 1–3	Did not advance		5
Samantha Cornett; Nikki Todd	Women's doubles	—N/a		Anckermann / Bonilla (GUA); W 2–0	Terán / Urrutia (MEX); W 2–0	Grainger / Sobhy (USA); L 1–2	2nd place, silver medalist(s)

Team

Athlete	Event	Group Stage				Quarterfinals	Semifinals	Final	
Athlete	Event	Opposition Result	Opposition Result	Opposition Result	Rank	Opposition Result	Opposition Result	Opposition Result	Rank
Shawn Delierre; Andrew Schnell; Graeme Schnell	Men's team	Ecuador; W 3–0	Colombia; W 2–1	—N/a	1	Bye	Argentina; W 2–1	Mexico; W 2–0	1st place, gold medalist(s)
Samantha Cornett; Hollie Naughton; Nikki Todd	Women's team	Colombia; W 2–1	Argentina; W 3–0	Brazil; W 3–0	1	Bye	Mexico; W 3–0	United States; L 1–2	2nd place, silver medalist(s)

== Swimming ==
Canada's swim team will consist of a maximum of 36 swimmers in the pool (18 per gender), and an additional four swimmers (two per gender) in the open water events. The swimming team was named on April 4, 2015. The open water team was announced on May 5, 2015.

Men

Athlete	Event	Heat		Final	
Athlete	Event	Time	Rank	Time	Rank
Karl Krug	50 m freestyle	22.55	10	22.59	11
Alex Loginov	50 m freestyle	22.37	7	22.47	8
Santo Condorelli	100 m freestyle	48.88	2	48.57	2nd place, silver medalist(s)
Yuri Kisil	100 m freestyle	49.07	4	49.26	6
Jeremy Bagshaw	200 m freestyle	1:48.76	5	1:47.92	7
Alec Page	200 m freestyle	1:50.34	11	1:49.86	9
Jeremy Bagshaw	400 m freestyle	3:52.13	5	3:50.55	5
Ryan Cochrane	400 m freestyle	3:50.58	1	3:48.29	1st place, gold medalist(s)
Ryan Cochrane	1500 m freestyle	—N/a		15:06.40	1st place, gold medalist(s)
Kier Maitland	1500 m freestyle	—N/a		15:16.35	5
Markus Thormeyer	100 m backstroke	55.26	8	55.52	7
Russell Wood	100 m backstroke	54.55	4	54.30	4
Markus Thormeyer	200 m backstroke	2:08.93	19	Did not advance	
Russell Wood	200 m backstroke	2:01.28	7	1:59.91	5
James Dergousoff	100 m breaststroke	1:03.28	12	1:02.57	11
Richard Funk	100 m breaststroke	1:00.80	4	1:00.29	3rd place, bronze medalist(s)
James Dergousoff	200 m breaststroke	2:16.30	11	2:15.31	11
Richard Funk	200 m breaststroke	2:12.22	3	2:11.51	2nd place, silver medalist(s)
Coleman Allen	100 m butterfly	53.23	10	53.46	10
Santo Condorelli	100 m butterfly	52.67	6	52.42	3rd place, bronze medalist(s)
Zack Chetrat	200 m butterfly	1:59.39	7	1:56.90	2nd place, silver medalist(s)
Alec Page	200 m butterfly	1:58.82	4	1:58.01	3rd place, bronze medalist(s)
Luke Reilly	200 metre individual medley	2:01.42	4	2:02.01	6
Evan White	200 metre individual medley	2:02.43	6	2:00.60	4
Alec Page	400 metre individual medley	4:21.46	8	4:18.61	5
Luke Reilly	400 metre individual medley	4:19.44	3	4:16.16	2nd place, silver medalist(s)
Santo Condorelli; Karl Krug; Evan Van Moerkerke; Yuri Kisil; Markus Thormeyer*; Stefan Milošević*	4 × 100 metre freestyle relay	3:18.77	2	3:14.32	2nd place, silver medalist(s)
Jeremy Bagshaw; Alec Page; Stefan Milošević; Ryan Cochrane; Yuri Kisil*; Coleman Allen*	4 × 200 metre freestyle relay	7:19.86	2	7:17.33	3rd place, bronze medalist(s)
Russell Wood; Richard Funk; Santo Condorelli; Yuri Kisil; James Dergousoff*; Coleman Allen*	4 × 100 metre medley relay	3:39.09	2	3:34.40	3rd place, bronze medalist(s)
Eric Hedlin	10 km open water	—N/a		1:59:59.5	9
Richard Weinberger	10 km open water	—N/a		1:54:09.3	4

Women

Athlete	Event	Heat		Final	
Athlete	Event	Time	Rank	Time	Rank
Chantal Van Landeghem	50 m freestyle	24.99	5	24.70	4
Michelle Williams	50 m freestyle	25.07	6	24.91	6
Chantal Van Landeghem	100 m freestyle	54.31	3	53.83	1st place, gold medalist(s)
Michelle Williams	100 m freestyle	55.29	6	54.55	4
Emily Overholt	200 m freestyle	2:00.43	6	1:57.55	2nd place, silver medalist(s)
Katerine Savard	200 m freestyle	1:59.74	4	1:58.70	4
Tabitha Baumann	400 m freestyle	4:18.70	10	4:16.03	9
Emily Overholt	400 m freestyle	4:18.21	8	4:08.42	1st place, gold medalist(s)
Tabitha Baumann	800 m freestyle	—N/a		8:48.37	10
Brittany MacLean	800 m freestyle	—N/a		8:32.06	4
Dominique Bouchard	100 m backstroke	1:00.44	2	1:00.54	4
Hilary Caldwell	100 m backstroke	1:00.97	5	1:01.01	5
Dominique Bouchard	200 m backstroke	2:09.59	1	2:09.74	2nd place, silver medalist(s)
Hilary Caldwell	200 m backstroke	2:10.15	2	2:08.22	1st place, gold medalist(s)
Rachel Nicol	100 m breaststroke	1:07.10	2	1:07.91	3rd place, bronze medalist(s)
Tera Van Beilen	100 m breaststroke	1:08.11	4	1:08.22	4
Martha McCabe	200 m breaststroke	2:27.47	3	2:24.51	2nd place, silver medalist(s)
Kierra Smith	200 m breaststroke	2:25.41	1	2:24.38	1st place, gold medalist(s)
Noemie Thomas	100 m butterfly	58.61	3	58.00	2nd place, silver medalist(s)
Katerine Savard	100 m butterfly	58.34	2	58.05	3rd place, bronze medalist(s)
Noemie Thomas	200 m butterfly	DNS	Did not advance		
Audrey Lacroix	200 m butterfly	2:10.33	2	2:07.68	1st place, gold medalist(s)
Sydney Pickrem	200 metre individual medley	2:11.16	2	2:11.29	3rd place, bronze medalist(s)
Erika Seltenreich-Hodgson	200 metre individual medley	2:14.02	4	2:14.06	5
Emily Overholt	400 metre individual medley	4:39.84	2	DSQ	
Sydney Pickrem	400 metre individual medley	4:40.77	3	4:38.03	2nd place, silver medalist(s)
Sandrine Mainville; Michele Williams; Katerine Savard; Chantal van Landeghem; Alyson Ackman*; Dominique Bouchard*	4 × 100 metre freestyle relay	3:42.83	2	3:36.80	1st place, gold medalist(s)
Emily Overholt; Katerine Savard; Alyson Ackman; Brittany MacLean; Erika Seltenreich-Hodgson*; Tabitha Baumann*	4 × 200 metre freestyle relay	8:06.06	2	7:59.36	3rd place, bronze medalist(s)
Dominique Bouchard; Rachel Nicol; Noemie Thomas; Chantal van Landeghem; Tera van Beilen*; Sandrine Mainville*	4 × 100 metre medley relay	4:02.28	2	3:58.51	2nd place, silver medalist(s)
Jade Dusablon	10 km open water	—N/a		2:04:36.7	7
Samantha Harding	10 km open water	—N/a		2:04:37.7	8

== Synchronized swimming ==
As hosts Canada qualified a full team of nine athletes. The team was named on May 28, 2015.

Athlete	Event	Technical Routine		Free Routine (Final)			
Athlete	Event	Points	Rank	Points	Rank	Total Points	Rank
Jacqueline Simoneau; Karine Thomas	Women's duet	88.0881	1	90.0000	1	178.0881	1st place, gold medalist(s)
Jacqueline Simoneau; Karine Thomas; Gabriella Brisson; Annabelle Frappier; Claudia Holzner; Lisa Mikelberg; Marie-Lou Morin; Samantha Nealon; Lisa Sanders	Women's team	87.9094	1	90.2000	1	178.1094	1st place, gold medalist(s)

== Table tennis ==
Canada qualified a men's and women's team for a total of six athletes (three men and three women). The team was officially announced on June 9, 2015.

Men

Athlete	Event	Group Stage				Round of 32	Round of 16	Quarterfinals	Semifinals	Final	
Athlete	Event	Opposition Result	Opposition Result	Opposition Result	Rank	Opposition Result	Opposition Result	Opposition Result	Opposition Result	Opposition Result	Rank
Marko Medjugorac	Singles	Jha (USA); L 1–4	Coello (ECU); W 4–2	Tsuboi (BRA); L 0–4	3	Did not advance					
Pierre-Luc Thériault	Singles	Galvez (DOM); W 4–0	Pereira (CUB); W 4–1	Gomez (CHI); W 4–0	1	Bye	Wang (USA); W 4–1	Tsuboi (BRA); L 1–4	Did not advance		5
Eugene Wang	Singles	Rodriguez (PER); W 4–0	Santos (DOM); W 4–0	Lara (MEX); W 4–1	1	Bye	Pereira (CUB); W 4–1	Tabachnik (ARG); W 4–0	Calderano (BRA); L 3–4	Did not advance	3rd place, bronze medalist(s)
Marko Medjugorac; Pierre-Luc Thériault; Eugene Wang	Team	Guatemala; W 3–0	Puerto Rico; L 2–3	—N/a	2	—N/a		Argentina; W 3–0	Brazil; L 0–3	Did not advance	3rd place, bronze medalist(s)

Women

Athlete	Event	Group Stage				Round of 32	Round of 16	Quarterfinals	Semifinals	Final / BM	
Athlete	Event	Opposition Result	Opposition Result	Opposition Result	Rank	Opposition Result	Opposition Result	Opposition Result	Opposition Result	Opposition Result	Rank
Alicia Côté	Singles	Arguelles (CHI); L 3–4	Mori (PER); W 4–1	Gui (BRA); L 0–4	3	Did not advance					
Anqi Luo	Singles	Soto (PER); W 4–0	Arvelo (VEN); W 4–0	Ortiz (DOM); W 4–3	1	Bye	Umbacia (COL); W 4–2	Gui (BRA); L 2–4	Did not advance		5
Zhang Mo	Singles	Castellano (CHI); W 4–1	Jimenez (CUB); W 4–0	Montufar (GUA); W 4–0	1	Bye	Diaz (PUR); W 4–0	Kumahara (BRA); L 1–4	Did not advance		5
Alicia Côté; Anqi Luo; Zhang Mo	Team	Guatemala; W 3–2	Colombia; W 3–1	—N/a	1	—N/a		Chile; W 3–1	Colombia; L 0–3	Did not advance	3rd place, bronze medalist(s)

== Taekwondo ==
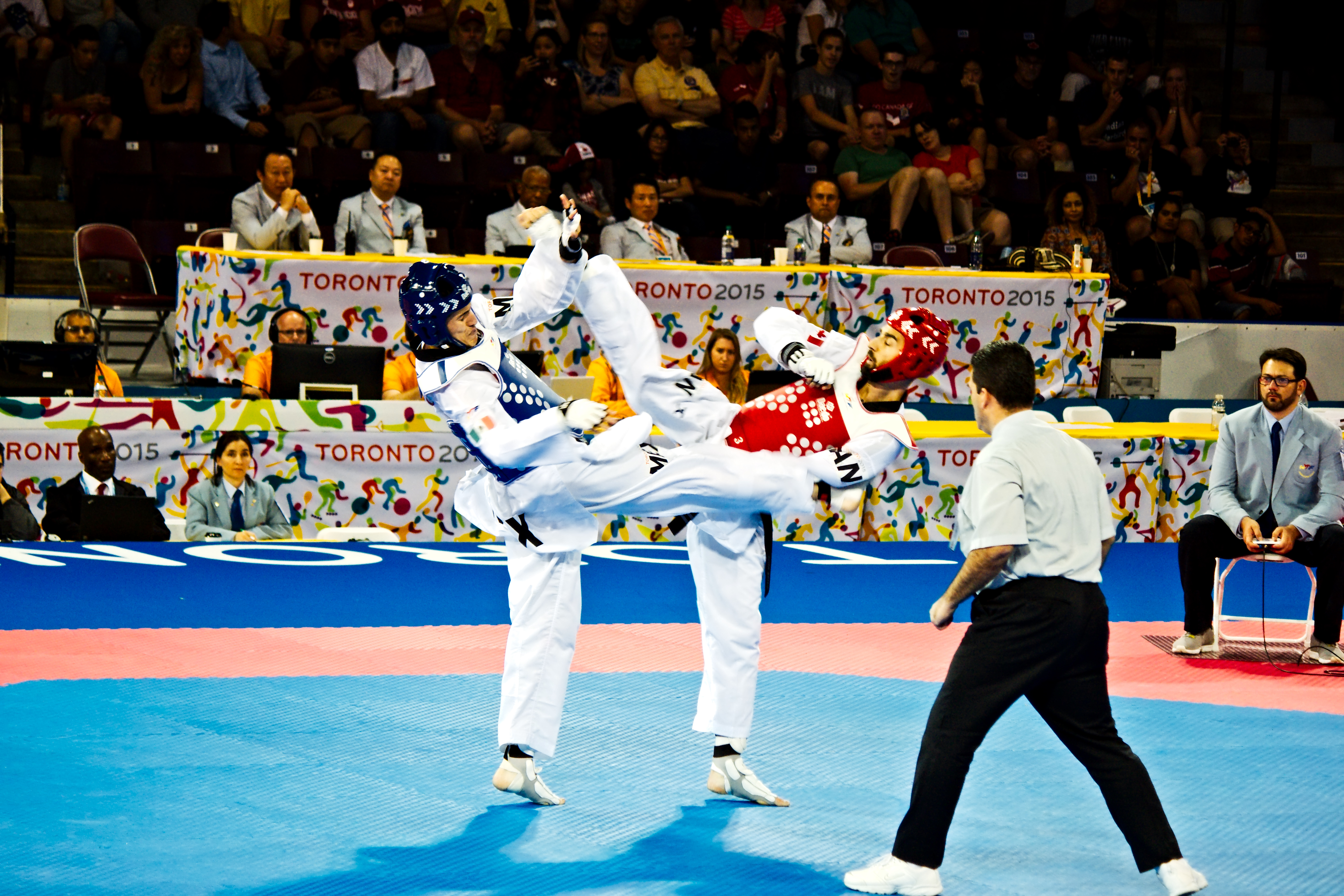
Maxime Potvin competes in the gold medal match

Canada as host nation will be allowed to enter a full team of four men and four women, for a total of eight athletes. The team was named on May 22, 2015.

Men

Athlete	Event	Round of 16	Quarterfinals	Semifinals	Repechage	Final / BM	Rank
Athlete	Event	Opposition Result	Opposition Result	Opposition Result	Opposition Result	Opposition Result	Rank
Tyler Muscat	-58kg	Maduro (ARU); L 4–9	Did not advance				
Maxime Potvin	-68kg	Bye	Precioso (BRA); W 15–5	Jennings (USA); W 13–11	—N/a	Gutierrez (MEX); L 3–6	2nd place, silver medalist(s)
Christopher Iliesco	-80kg	Ferrera (HON); W 5–3	Hernandez (DOM); L 4–7	Did not advance	Lozano (COL); W 8–5	Lizarraga (MEX); L 8–9	5
Marc-Andre Bergeron	+80kg	Bye	Rivas (VEN); L 1–4	Did not advance	Molinares (COL); W 9–2	Lopez (MEX); W 8–7	3rd place, bronze medalist(s)

Women

Athlete	Event	Round of 16	Quarterfinals	Semifinals	Repechage	Final	Rank
Athlete	Event	Opposition Result	Opposition Result	Opposition Result	Opposition Result	Opposition Result	Rank
Yvette Yong	-49kg	Bye	Rodriguez (COL); W 12–5	Manjarrez (MEX); L 14–23	—N/a	Silva (BRA); L 6–8	5
Evelyn Gonda	-57kg	Polanco (DOM); W 13–1	Correa (CHI); W 16–4	Armeria (MEX); L 6–10	—N/a	Nunez (CUB); L 3–10	5
Ashley Kraayeveld	-67kg	Bye	Heredia (MEX); L 2–14	Did not advance	Arnoldt (ARG); L 0–21	Did not advance	7
Nathalie Iliesco	+67kg	Ávila (HON); W 8–0	Espinoza (MEX); L 3–4	Did not advance	—N/a	Galacho (BRA); L 0-1	5

== Tennis ==
Canada as host nation can enter a maximum team of six athletes (three men and three women). The team was announced on June 9, 2015. Later Sharon Fichman withdrew from the team, after her injury did not recover in time, she was replaced by Carol Zhao.

Singles

Athlete	Event	Round of 64	Round of 32	Round of 16	Quarterfinals	Semifinals	Final / BM	
Athlete	Event	Opposition Score	Opposition Score	Opposition Score	Opposition Score	Opposition Score	Opposition Score	Rank
Philip Bester	Men's	Bye	Austin (USA); W 6–4, 6–4	Bagnis (ARG); L 6–4, 3–6, 4–6	Did not advance			
Peter Polansky	Men's	Bye	Cid (DOM); L 2–6, 5–7	Did not advance				
Brayden Schnur	Men's	Martínez (VEN); W 6–3, 6–4	King (BAR); W 6–2, 6–4	Struvay (COL); W 6–4, 7–6^{(7–0)}	Novikov (USA); L 3–6, 4–6	Did not advance		
Françoise Abanda	Women's	—N/a	Sánchez (MEX); W 6–1, 4–6, 7–5	Puig (PUR); L 0–6, 3–6	Did not advance			
Gabriela Dabrowski	Women's	—N/a	Cé (BRA); W 6–3, 4–6, 6–3	Chirico (USA); W 6–3, 4–6, 6–4	Duque Mariño (COL); L 2–6, 1–6	Did not advance		
Carol Zhao	Women's	—N/a	Irigoyen (ARG); W 1–6, 7–5, 6–4	González (PAR); W 6–4, 4–6, 6–3	Rodríguez (MEX); L 0–6, 4–6	Did not advance		

Doubles

Athlete	Event	Round of 16	Quarterfinals	Semifinals	Final / BM	
Athlete	Event	Opposition Score	Opposition Score	Opposition Score	Opposition Score	Rank
Philip Bester; Brayden Schnur	Men's	Jarry / Podlipnik (CHI); L 4–6, 4–6	Did not advance			
Gabriela Dabrowski; Carol Zhao	Women's	—N/a	Giangreco / González (PAR); W 6–2, 6–3	Irigoyen / Ormaechea (ARG); W 6–2, 6–1	Rodríguez / Zacarías (MEX); W 6–1, 4–6, [10–5]	1st place, gold medalist(s)
Philip Bester; Gabriela Dabrowski	Mixed	Bye	Koch / Podlipnik (CHI); W 6–2, 6–2	Duque Mariño / Struvay (COL); W 4–6, 6–0, [10–3]	Andreozzi / Irigoyen (ARG); L 3–6, 0–6	2nd place, silver medalist(s)

== Triathlon ==
Canada as host nation will be allowed to enter a full team of three men and three women, for a total of six athletes. The team was officially named on June 14, 2015.

Athlete	Event	Swim (1.5 km)	Trans 1	Bike (40 km)	Trans 2	Run (10 km)	Total	Rank
Kyle Jones	Men's individual	18:58	0:22	DNF				
Tyler Mislawchuk	Men's individual	18:47	0:24	1:17:38	0:22	31:53	1:49:54	10
Andrew Yorke	Men's individual	19:05	0:22	1:17:40	0:22	31:29	1:49:31	7
Joanna Brown	Women's individual	20:16	0:42	1:00:48	0:29	39:46	2:02:04	13
Paula Findlay	Women's individual	20:16	0:37	1:00:46	0:25	37:49	1:59:55	9
Ellen Pennock	Women's individual	20:10	0:37	1:00:54	0:23	36:37	1:58:42	6

== Volleyball ==
Canada as host nation will automatically enter a men's and women's teams. Each team will consist of 12 athletes, for a total of 24.

=== Men's tournament ===
Team

Canada announced their squad on June, 18 2015.

- Nicholas Hoag
- Dan Lewis
- Steven Marshall
- John Gordon Perrin
- TJ Sanders
- Gavin Schmitt
- Dustin Schneider
- Adam Simac
- Toontje van Lankvelt
- Rudy Verhoeff
- Graham Vigrass
- Fred Winters

Standings

Pos	Team	Pld	W	L	Pts	SPW	SPL	SPR	SW	SL	SR
1	Canada	3	3	0	12	280	249	1.124	9	3	3.000
2	Puerto Rico	3	2	1	10	268	248	1.081	7	4	1.750
3	United States	3	1	2	7	295	294	1.003	6	7	0.857
4	Mexico	3	0	3	1	195	247	0.789	1	9	0.111

Source: Archived 2016-03-04 at the Wayback Machine

Results

Date		Score		Set 1	Set 2	Set 3	Set 4	Set 5	Total	Report
Jul 16	Canada	3–0	Mexico	25–18	25–19	25–18			75–55	P2 P3
Jul 19	Canada	3–1	Puerto Rico	25–23	25–23	21 –25	25-20		96 –91	P2 P3
Jul 21	Canada	3–2	United States	19–25	25–27	25–23	25–16	15–12	109–103	P2 P3

Semifinals

Date		Score		Set 1	Set 2	Set 3	Set 4	Set 5	Total	Report
Jul 24	Canada	1–3	Argentina	26–28	25–20	21–25	23–25		95–98	P2 P3

Bronze medal match

Date		Score		Set 1	Set 2	Set 3	Set 4	Set 5	Total	Report
Jul 26	(bronze) Canada	3–1	Puerto Rico	25–11	25–12	23–25	25–18		98–64	P2 P3

2015 Pan American Games 3rd place

Canada

=== Women's tournament ===
Team

- Tesca Andrew-Wasylik
- Lisa Barclay
- Lucy Charuk
- Dana Cranston
- Marisa Field
- Tabitha Love
- Jennifer Lundqvist
- Shanice Marcelle
- Brittney Page
- Kyla Richey
- Danielle Smith
- Jaimie Thibeault

Standings

Pos	Team	Pld	W	L	Pts	SPW	SPL	SPR	SW	SL	SR
1	Dominican Republic	3	2	1	10	261	215	1.214	7	4	1.750
2	Argentina	3	2	1	10	252	254	0.992	7	4	1.750
3	Cuba	3	1	2	5	248	259	0.958	4	7	0.571
4	Canada	3	1	2	5	228	261	0.874	4	7	0.571

Source: Archived 2015-10-20 at the Wayback Machine

Results

Date		Score		Set 1	Set 2	Set 3	Set 4	Set 5	Total	Report
Jul 16	Canada	0–3	Dominican Republic	15–25	13–25	15–25			43–75	P2P3
Jul 18	Canada	3–1	Cuba	25–21	19–25	25–18	25–22		94–86	P2P3
Jul 20	Canada	1–3	Argentina	25–23	25–27	20–25	21-25		91–100	P2P3

Seventh place match

Date		Score		Set 1	Set 2	Set 3	Set 4	Set 5	Total	Report
Jul 23	Canada	2–3	Peru	25–22	24-26	25–17	21-25	13-15	108–105	P2 P3

2015 Pan American Games 8th place

Canada

== Water polo ==
Canada as host nation automatically qualified to enter a men's and women's team. Each team consisted of 13 athletes, for a total of 26.

=== Men's tournament ===
Canada announced their squad on June 23, 2015.

- Dusan Aleksic
- Justin Boyd
- Nicolas Constantin-Bicari
- John Conway
- Kevin Graham
- Constantine Kudaba
- Jared McElroy
- Dusan Radojcic
- Robin Randall
- Scott Robinson
- Alec Taschereau
- George Torakis
- Oliver Vikalo

Group B

Team	Pld	W	D	L	GF	GA	GD	Pts	Qualification
Brazil	3	3	0	0	55	20	+35	6	Qualified for the semifinals
Canada	3	2	0	1	44	22	+22	4	Qualified for the semifinals
Mexico	3	0	1	2	27	50	−23	1	
Venezuela	3	0	1	2	13	47	−34	1	

7 July 2015; 18:08	Report	Canada	9–11	Brazil	Markham Pan Am Centre; Referees: Thomas Molnae (HUN), Jaume Teixeira (ESP)
7 July 2015; 18:08	Report	Score by quarters: 2–4, 4–3, 1–4, 2–0			Markham Pan Am Centre; Referees: Thomas Molnae (HUN), Jaume Teixeira (ESP)
7 July 2015; 18:08	Report	Conway 3, Boyd 2	Goals	Perrone 3	Markham Pan Am Centre; Referees: Thomas Molnae (HUN), Jaume Teixeira (ESP)

9 July 2015; 18:08	Report	Venezuela	2–16	Canada	Markham Pan Am Centre; Referees: Jaume Teixido (SPA), Reynel Castillo (PUR)
9 July 2015; 18:08	Report	Score by quarters: 0-5, 1-3, 1-5, 0-3			Markham Pan Am Centre; Referees: Jaume Teixido (SPA), Reynel Castillo (PUR)
9 July 2015; 18:08	Report	2 players 1	Goals	Boyd, Graham 5, Bicari, Kudaba 2	Markham Pan Am Centre; Referees: Jaume Teixido (SPA), Reynel Castillo (PUR)

11 July 2015; 18:08	Report	Mexico	9–19	Canada	Markham Pan Am Centre; Referees: Humberto Navarro (USA), Thomas Mulnar (HUN)
11 July 2015; 18:08	Report	Score by quarters: 0-2, 3-5, 3-5, 3-7			Markham Pan Am Centre; Referees: Humberto Navarro (USA), Thomas Mulnar (HUN)
11 July 2015; 18:08	Report	Alvarez 2	Goals	Boyd 5, Mcelroy Conway Bicari 3	Markham Pan Am Centre; Referees: Humberto Navarro (USA), Thomas Mulnar (HUN)

Semifinal

13 July 2015; 18:00	Report	United States	9–8	Canada	Markham Pan Am Centre; Referees: Jaume Teixido (SPA), Thomas Mulnar (HUN)
13 July 2015; 18:00	Report	Score by quarters: 3-1, 1-2, 2-1, 3-4			Markham Pan Am Centre; Referees: Jaume Teixido (SPA), Thomas Mulnar (HUN)
13 July 2015; 18:00	Report	Cupido 3	Goals	Conway 3, Boyd 2, Vikalo 1, Graham 1, Taschereau 1	Markham Pan Am Centre; Referees: Jaume Teixido (SPA), Thomas Mulnar (HUN)

Bronze Medal Match

15 July 2015; 18:00	Report	(bronze) Canada	16–8	Argentina	Markham Pan Am Centre; Referees: Edmundo Rodrigues (ECU), Humberto Navarro (USA)
15 July 2015; 18:00	Report	Score by quarters: 3-2, 5-3, 4-2, 4-1			Markham Pan Am Centre; Referees: Edmundo Rodrigues (ECU), Humberto Navarro (USA)
15 July 2015; 18:00	Report	Conway 4, Taschereau 3, Mcelroy 2, Graham 2, Boyd 2, Vikalo 1, Kudaba 1.	Goals	Yanez 3, Veich 3, Bulgheroni 1, Corsi 1	Markham Pan Am Centre; Referees: Edmundo Rodrigues (ECU), Humberto Navarro (USA)

=== Women's tournament ===
Canada announced their squad on May 28, 2015.

- Krystina Alogbo
- Joëlle Békhazi
- Carmen Eggens
- Monika Eggens
- Shae Fournier
- Jessica Gaudreault
- Jakie Kohli
- Katrina Monton
- Dominique Perreault
- Christine Robinson
- Stephanie Valin
- Claire Wright
- Emma Wright

Group B

Team	Pld	W	D	L	GF	GA	GD	Pts	Qualification
Canada	3	2	1	0	41	16	+25	5	Qualified for the semifinals
Brazil	3	2	1	0	42	18	+24	5	Qualified for the semifinals
Venezuela	3	0	1	2	16	44	−28	1	
Puerto Rico	3	0	1	2	26	47	−21	1	

7 July 2015; 12:08	Report	Canada	7–7	Brazil	Markham Pan Am Centre; Referees: Diego Garibaldi (ARG), Daniel Vazquez (MEX)
7 July 2015; 12:08	Report	Score by quarters: 1–2, 2–1, 2–3, 2–1			Markham Pan Am Centre; Referees: Diego Garibaldi (ARG), Daniel Vazquez (MEX)
7 July 2015; 12:08	Report	7 players 1	Goals	3 players 2	Markham Pan Am Centre; Referees: Diego Garibaldi (ARG), Daniel Vazquez (MEX)

8 July 2015; 12:08	Report	Venezuela	4–15	Canada	Markham Pan Am Centre; Referees: Claudia Aguilar (MEX), Mark Maretzki (USA).
8 July 2015; 12:08	Report	Score by quarters: 0–4, 1–3, 1–4, 2–4			Markham Pan Am Centre; Referees: Claudia Aguilar (MEX), Mark Maretzki (USA).
8 July 2015; 12:08	Report	4 players 1	Goals	Perreault, Robinson 3	Markham Pan Am Centre; Referees: Claudia Aguilar (MEX), Mark Maretzki (USA).

9 July 2015; 12:08	Report	Canada	19–5	Puerto Rico	Markham Pan Am Centre; Referees: Diego Garibaldi (ARG), Claudia Aguilar (MEX)
9 July 2015; 12:08	Report	Score by quarters: 4–1, 4–2, 5–0, 6–2			Markham Pan Am Centre; Referees: Diego Garibaldi (ARG), Claudia Aguilar (MEX)
9 July 2015; 12:08	Report	Robinson 4	Goals	Delgado 2	Markham Pan Am Centre; Referees: Diego Garibaldi (ARG), Claudia Aguilar (MEX)

Semifinal

12 July 2015; 18:00	Report	Cuba	7–14	Canada	Markham Pan Am Centre; Referees: Reynel Castillo (PUR), Diego Garibaldi (ARG)
12 July 2015; 18:00	Report	Score by quarters: 1-3, 1-5, 3-2, 2-4			Markham Pan Am Centre; Referees: Reynel Castillo (PUR), Diego Garibaldi (ARG)
12 July 2015; 18:00	Report	Bernal 2	Goals	Eggens, Robinson 3	Markham Pan Am Centre; Referees: Reynel Castillo (PUR), Diego Garibaldi (ARG)

Gold Medal Match

14 July 2015; 20:00	Report	(gold) United States	13–4	Canada (silver)	Markham Pan Am Centre; Referees: Thomas Molnar (HUN), Jaume Teixido (SPA)
14 July 2015; 20:00	Report	Score by quarters: 3-2, 3-1, 4-0, 3-1			Markham Pan Am Centre; Referees: Thomas Molnar (HUN), Jaume Teixido (SPA)
14 July 2015; 20:00	Report	2 players 4	Goals	Eggens 2	Markham Pan Am Centre; Referees: Thomas Molnar (HUN), Jaume Teixido (SPA)

== Water skiing ==
Canada as host nation automatically qualifies a full team of five athletes (four in water skiing, one in wakeboard). The team was announced on June 3, 2015.

Waterski and Wakeboard

Athlete	Event	Preliminary	Rank	Final	Rank
Ryan Dodd	Men's jump	66.8	1	64.8	1st place, gold medalist(s)
Jaret Llewellyn	Men's jump	59.3	4	59.9	4
Jaret Llewellyn	Men's slalom	2.50/58/13.00	15	Did not advance	
Jaret Llewellyn	Men's tricks	10360	2	10550	2nd place, silver medalist(s)
Jason McClintock	Men's slalom	3.50/58/11.25	4	1.00/58/10.25	2nd place, silver medalist(s)
Jason McClintock	Men's tricks	9380	3	9440	4
Rusty Malinoski	Men's wakeboard	79.02	1	89.11	1st place, gold medalist(s)
Whitney McClintock	Women's jump	47.8	2	47.7	2nd place, silver medalist(s)
Whitney McClintock	Women's slalom	3.00/55/10.75	1	3.50/55/11.25	1st place, gold medalist(s)
Whitney McClintock	Women's tricks	7920	2	8030	2nd place, silver medalist(s)

Overall

Athlete	Event	Trick	Ov. Trick	Slalom	Ov. Slalom	Jump	Ov. Jump	Overall	Rank
Jaret Llewellyn	Men's overall	10360	1000.0	2.50/58/12.00	757.1	62.1	1000.0	2757.1	2nd place, silver medalist(s)
Whitney McClintock	Women's overall	8370	1000.0	0.00/55/11.25	869.6	44.8	926.7	2796.3	1st place, gold medalist(s)

== Weightlifting ==
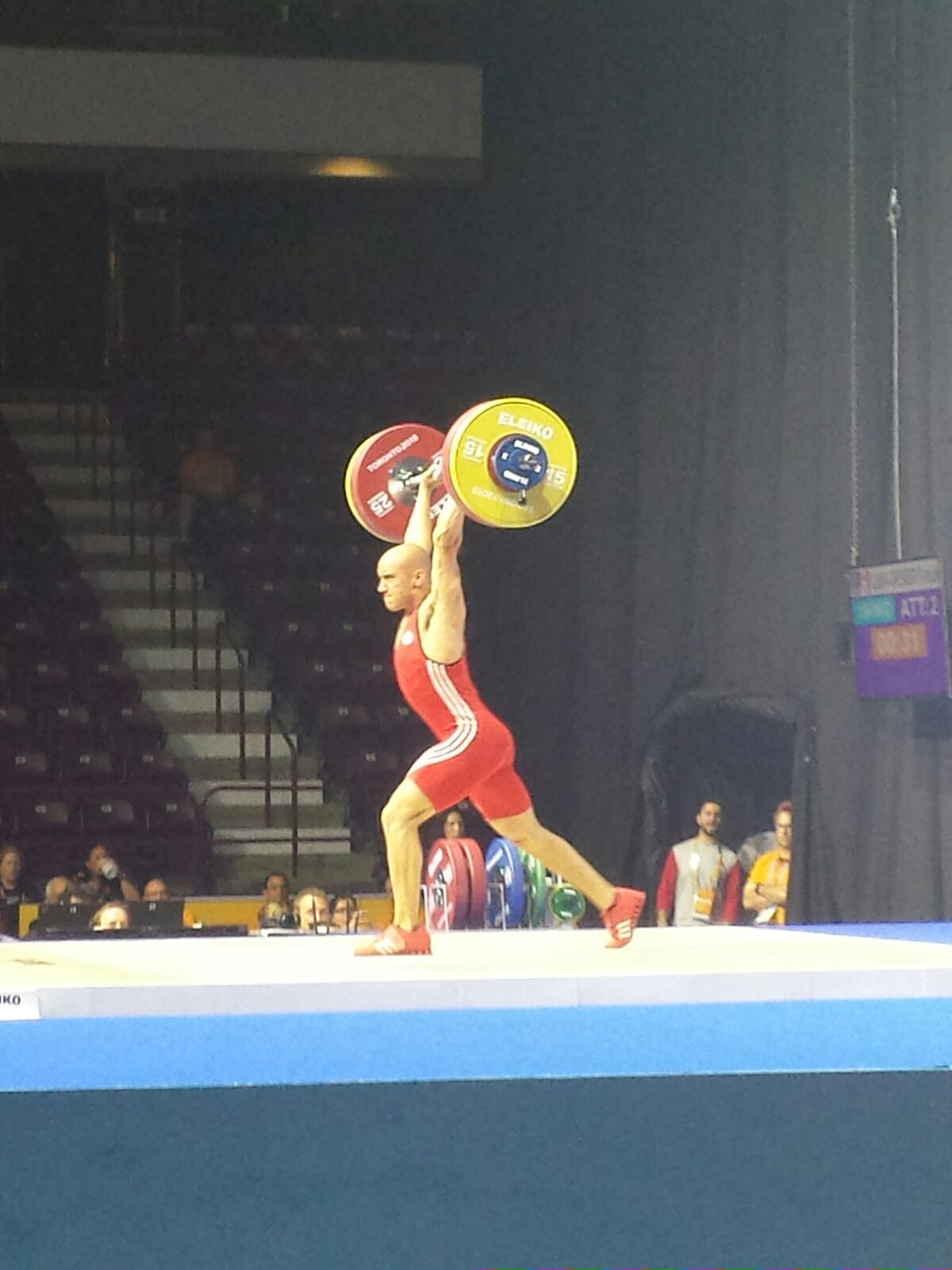
Francis Luna-Grenier lifts during the men's 69 kg weightlifting competition.

Canada as the host nation was permitted to enter a full team of 13 athletes (7 men and 6 women).

Men

Athlete	Event	Snatch		Clean & Jerk		Total	Rank
Athlete	Event	Result	Rank	Result	Rank	Total	Rank
Francis Luna-Grenier	−69 kg	132	4	167	3	299	3rd place, bronze medalist(s)
Jérôme Boisclair	−77 kg	130	9	160	9	290	9
Darryl Conrad	−77 kg	128	10	NM		DNF	
Pascal Plamondon	−85 kg	157	4	186	4	343	4
Boady Santavy	−85 kg	146	6	176	6	322	6
David Samayoa	−94 kg	145	8	172	10	317	10
George Kobaladze	+105 kg	168	3	208	2	376	2nd place, silver medalist(s)

Women

Athlete	Event	Snatch		Clean & Jerk		Total	Rank
Athlete	Event	Result	Rank	Result	Rank	Total	Rank
Amanda Braddock	−48 kg	70	9	85	9	155	9
Jessica Ruel	−53 kg	81	4	96	5	177	5
Marie-Josée Arès-Pilon	−69 kg	95	5	114	6	209	6
Kristel Ngarlem	−69 kg	93	6	118	4	211	4
Marie-Eve Beauchemin-Nadeau	−75 kg	98	5	127	3	225	4
Prabdeep Sanghera	−75 kg	100	3	119	5	219	5

== Wrestling ==
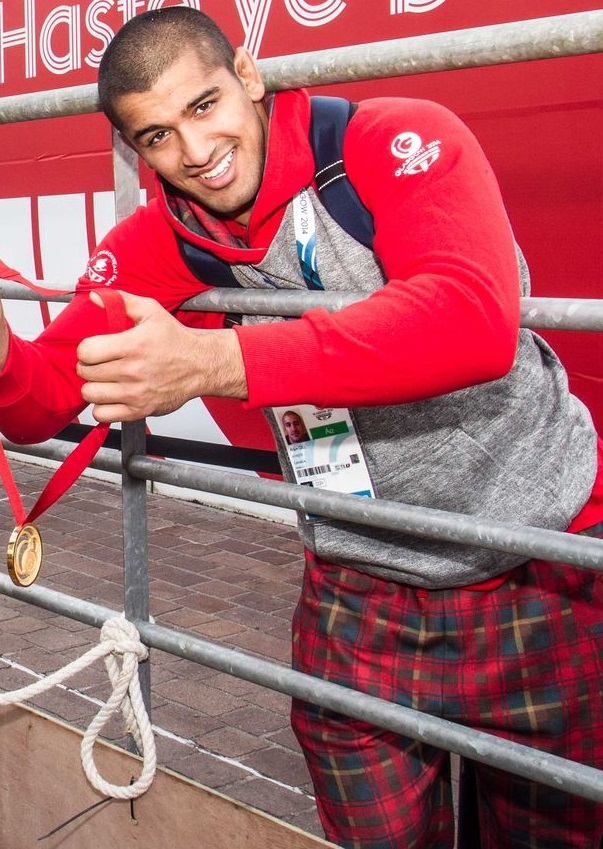
Arjun Gill (pictured here at the 2014 Commonwealth Games) won silver

Canada qualified full female team of six athletes and a full men's freestyle team of six athletes, as well as four male Greco-Roman wrestlers. The team was officially announced on May 19, 2015. John Pineda was scheduled to be among the participants, but he did not make weight and had to withdraw from the 57 kg freestyle event.

Men's freestyle

Athlete	Event	Preliminaries	Quarterfinals	Semifinals	Final / BM	Rank
Athlete	Event	Opposition Result	Opposition Result	Opposition Result	Opposition Result	Rank
Haislan Garcia	–65 kg	—N/a	Portillo (ESA); W 8–0	Maren (CUB); L 0–2	Guzman (COL); W 2–0	3rd place, bronze medalist(s)
Jevon Balfour	–74 kg	Munoz (PAN); W 10–0	De Oliveira (BRA); W 10–0	Burroughs (USA); L 0–11	López (CUB); L 0–10	5
Tamerlan Tagziev	–86 kg	—N/a	Salas (CUB); L 4–7	Did not advance	Ambrocio (PER); W 5–0	3rd place, bronze medalist(s)
Arjun Gill	–97 kg	—N/a	Ruiz (MEX); W 10–0	Santos (PUR); W 6–1	Snyder (USA); L 0–10	2nd place, silver medalist(s)
Korey Jarvis	–125 kg	—N/a	Lopez (PUR); W 10–0	De Oliveira (BRA); W 10–0	Rey (USA); L 0–3	2nd place, silver medalist(s)

Greco-Roman

Athlete	Event	Preliminaries	Quarterfinals	Semifinals	Final / BM	Rank
Athlete	Event	Opposition Result	Opposition Result	Opposition Result	Opposition Result	Rank
Dylan Williams	–59 kg	—N/a	Soto (MEX); L 0–9	Did not advance	Torres (CHI); L 0–3	5
Jeremy Latour	–98 kg	—N/a	Albino (BRA); L 1–10	Did not advance		8
Charles Thoms	–130 kg	—N/a	Ayub (CHI); L 2–10	Did not advance	Encarnacion (DOM); L 0–2	5

Women's Freestyle

Athlete	Event	Preliminaries	Quarterfinals	Semifinals	Final / BM	Rank
Athlete	Event	Opposition Result	Opposition Result	Opposition Result	Opposition Result	Rank
Genevieve Morrison	–48 kg	—N/a	Lampe (USA); W 12–8	Guzmán (CUB); W 6–0	Mallqui (PER); W 5–4	1st place, gold medalist(s)
Brianne Barry	–53 kg	—N/a	Del Valle (CUB); L 1–10	Did not advance		7
Michelle Fazzari	–58 kg	—N/a	Roa (COL); L 5–8	Did not advance		7
Braxton Stone-Papadopoulos	–63 kg	—N/a	Olivares (PER); W 10–0	Rentería (COL); W 6–5	Vidiaux (CUB); W 7–3	1st place, gold medalist(s)
Dorothy Yeats	–69 kg	—N/a	Sanchez (CUB); W 6–0	Vazquez (ARG); W 14–3	Acosta (VEN); W 13–2	1st place, gold medalist(s)
Justina Di Stasio	–75 kg	—N/a	Weffer Guanipe (VEN); W 5–3	Hechavarria (CUB); W 4–4	Gray (USA); L 6-7	2nd place, silver medalist(s)

== See also ==
- Canada at the 2015 Parapan American Games
- Canada at the 2016 Summer Olympics
