= List of Pan American Games medalists in rugby sevens =

This is the complete list of Pan American medalists in rugby sevens.

== Men's ==
Games	Gold	Silver	Bronze
2011 Guadalajara	Canada; Nanyak Dala; Sean Duke; Matthew Evans; Sean White; Ciaran Hearn; Nathan Hirayama; Tyler Ardon; Phil Mack; John Moonlight; Taylor Paris; Mike Scholz; Conor Trainor	Argentina; Gabriel Ascárate; Santiago Bottini; Nicolás Bruzzone; Francisco Cuneo; Manuel Gutierrez; Joaquin Luccheti; Jose Merello; Manuel Montero; Ramiro Moyano; Hernan Olivari; Javier Ortega Desio; Diego Palma	United States; Mark Bokhoven; Colin Hawley; Rocco Mauer; Folau Niua; Milemoti Pulu; Nu'u Punimata; Blaine Scully; Roland Suniula; Shalom Suniula; Zack Test; Peter Tiberio; Maka Unufe
2015 Toronto	Canada; Sean White; Admir Cejvanovic; Mike Fuailefau; John Moonlight; Conor Trainor; Sean Duke; Phil Mack; Justin Douglas; Nathan Hirayama; Lucas Hammond; Harry Jones; Matthew Mullins	Argentina; Fernando Luna; Santiago Álvarez; Germán Schulz; Nicolás Bruzzone; Emiliano Boffelli; Gastón Revol; Bautista Ezcurra; Rodrigo Etchart; Franco Sábato; Juan Tuculet; Ramiro Finco; Axel Müller	United States; Carlin Isles; Patrick Blair; Brett Thompson; Garrett Bender; Mike Te'o; Stephen Tomasin; Will Holder; Ben Leatigaga; Nate Augspurger; Madison Hughes; Perry Baker; Martin Iosefo
2019 Lima	Argentina; Fernando Luna; Felipe Del Mestre; Germán Schulz; Francisco Ulloa; Tomás Vanni; Santiago Álvarez; Lautaro Bazán; Gastón Revol; Matías Osadczuk; Santiago Mare; Luciano González; Franco Sábato	Canada; Sean Duke; Admir Cejvanovic; Brennig Prevost; Phil Berna; Luke McCloskey; Cooper Coats; Josiah Morra; Josh Thiel; Nathan Hirayama; Pat Kay; Harry Jones; Adam Zaruba	United States; Ben Broselle; Harley Wheeler; Joe Schroeder; Jake Lachina; Marcus Tupuola; Travion Clark; Cody Melphy; Maceo Brown; Naima Fuala'au; Anthony Welmers; Lorenzo Thomas; D'Montae Noble
2023 Santiago	Argentina; Joaquín Pellandini; Santiago Verafeld; Germán Schulz; Matteo Graziano; Agustin Fraga; Santiago Álvarez; Alejo Lavayen; Gastón Revol; Matías Osadczuk; Santiago Mare; Luciano González; Marcos Moneta	Chile; Clemente Armstrong; Luca Strabucchi; Gonzalo Lara Mehech; Santiago Videla; Manuel José Bustamante; Cristóbal Game; Lucca Avelli; Ernesto Ariel Tchimino; Francisco Urroz; Diego Warnken; Nicolás Garafulic; Tomás Salas	Canada; Elias Ergas; Jacob Thiel; Kalin Sager; Phil Berna; Ethan Hager; Elias Hancock; Thomas Isherwood; Alexander Russell; John Carson; Lachlan Kratz; Matthew McDougall-Percillier; David Richard

== Women's ==
Games	Gold	Silver	Bronze
2015 Toronto	Canada; Brittany Benn; Kayla Moleschi; Karen Paquin; Kelly Russell; Ashley Steacy; Sara Kaljuvee; Jen Kish; Nadejda Popov; Ghislaine Landry; Hannah Darling; Magali Harvey; Natasha Watcham-Roy	United States; Megan Bonny; Kelly Griffin; Joanne Fa'avesi; Leyla Kelter; Richelle Stephens; Lauren Doyle; Kristen Thomas; Hannah Lopez; Melissa Fowler; Irene Gardner; Kate Zackary; Kathryn Johnson	Brazil; Juliana Esteves dos Santos; Bruna Lotufo; Beatriz Futuro Muhlbauer; Edna Santini; Paula Ishibashi; Isadora Cerullo; Claudia Lopes Teles; Haline Leme Scatrut; Angelica Pereira Gevaerd; Maira Bravo Behrendt; Raquel Kochhann; Mariana Barbosa Ramalho
2019 Lima	Canada; Delaney Aikens; Kayla Moleschi; Caroline Crossley; Breanne Nicholas; Tausani Levale; Olivia De Couvreur; Sara Kaljuvee; Pam Buisa; Asia Hogan-Rochester; Kaili Lukan; Emma Chown; Temitope Ogunjimi	United States; Cheta Emba; Ilona Maher; Abby Gustaitis; Alena Olsen; Stephanie Rovetti; Lauren Thunen; Naya Tapper; Jordan Matyas; Emily Henrich; Kayla Canett; Ariana Ramsey; Kristi Kirshe	Colombia; Nicole Acevedo; Isabel Romero; Carmen Ibarra; Daniela Alzate; Lina Pedroza; Catalina Arango; María Arzuaga; Leidy Soto; Camila Lopera; Laura Mejía; Sharon Acevado; Valentina Tapias
2023 Santiago	United States; Cheta Emba; Ilona Maher; Nicole Heavirland; Alena Olsen; Naya Tapper; Joanne Faavesi; Stephanie Rovetti; Kristi Kirshe; Alexandria Sedrick; Ariana Ramsey; Samantha Sullivan; Lauren Doyle	Canada; Olivia De Couvreur; Alysha Corrigan; Caroline Crossley; Breanne Nicholas; Lucienne Romeo; Charity Williams; Chloe Daniels; Margaret Valenzuela; Carissa Norsten; Eden Kilgour; Piper Logan; Asia Hogan-Rochester	Brazil; Mariana Nicolau; Luiza Campos; Rafaela Zanellato; Gisele Gomes; Thalia da Silva Costa; Milena Mariano; Aline Furtado; Marina Fioravanti; Andressa do Nascimento; Bianca dos Santos Silva; Gabriela Lima; Yasmim Soares

== All-time medal table ==
Rank	Nation	Gold	Silver	Bronze	Total
1	Canada	4	2	1	7
2	Argentina	2	2	0	4
3	United States	1	2	3	6
4	Chile	0	1	0	1
5	Brazil	0	0	2	2
6	Colombia	0	0	1	1
Totals (6 entries)		7	7	7	21
