= List of 2015 Pan American Games medalists =

The 2015 Pan American Games were held in Toronto, Canada from 10 July to 26 July 2015.

== Archery ==
Event	Gold	Silver	Bronze
Men's individual	Luis Álvarez; Mexico	Brady Ellison; United States	Jason Lyon; Canada
Men's team	Mexico; Juan René Serrano; Ernesto Horacio Boardman; Luis Álvarez	United States; Zach Garrett; Brady Ellison; Collin Klimitchek	Brazil; Marcus Vinicius D'Almeida; Bernardo Oliveira; Daniel Xavier
Women's individual	Khatuna Lorig; United States	Ana Rendón; Colombia	Karla Hinojosa; Mexico
Women's team	Colombia; Ana Rendón; Natalia Sánchez; Maira Sepúlveda	Mexico; Karla Hinojosa; Aída Román; Alejandra Valencia	United States; Ariel Gibilaro; Khatuna Lorig; La Nola Pritchard

== Athletics ==
=== Men's events ===
Event	Gold	Silver	Bronze
100 metres	Andre De Grasse; Canada	Ramon Gittens; Barbados	Antoine Adams; Saint Kitts and Nevis
200 metres	Andre De Grasse; Canada	Rasheed Dwyer; Jamaica	Alonso Edward; Panama
400 metres	Luguelín Santos; Dominican Republic	Machel Cedenio; Trinidad and Tobago	Kyle Clemons; United States
800 metres	Clayton Murphy; United States	Rafith Rodríguez; Colombia	Ryan Martin; United States
1500 metres	Andrew Wheating; United States	Nathan Brannen; Canada	Charles Philibert-Thiboutot; Canada
5000 metres	Juan Luis Barrios; Mexico	David Torrence; United States	Víctor Aravena; Chile
10,000 metres	Mohammed Ahmed; Canada	Aron Rono; United States	Juan Luis Barrios; Mexico
110 m hurdles	David Oliver; United States	Mikel Thomas; Trinidad and Tobago	Shane Brathwaite; Barbados
400 m hurdles	Jeffery Gibson; Bahamas	Javier Culson; Puerto Rico	Roxroy Cato; Jamaica
3000 m steeplechase	Matthew Hughes; Canada	Alex Genest; Canada	Cory Leslie; United States
4 × 100 m relay	United States; BeeJay Lee; Wallace Spearmon; Kendal Williams; Remontay McClain; Sean McLean	Brazil; Gustavo dos Santos; Vítor Hugo dos Santos; Bruno de Barros; Aldemir da Silva Junior	Trinidad and Tobago; Rondel Sorrillo; Keston Bledman; Emmanuel Callender; Dan-Neil Telesford; Mikel Thomas
4 × 400 m relay	Trinidad and Tobago; Renny Quow; Jarrin Solomon; Emanuel Mayers; Machel Cedenio; Jehue Gordon	Cuba; Williams Collazo; Adrian Chacon; Osmaidel Pellicier; Yoandys Lescay	United States; Kyle Clemons; James Harris; Marcus Chambers; Kerron Clement; Jeshua Anderson
Marathon	Richer Pérez; Cuba	Raúl Pacheco; Peru	Mariano Mastromarino; Argentina
20 km walk	Evan Dunfee; Canada	Inaki Gomez; Canada	Caio Bonfim; Brazil
50 km walk	Andrés Chocho; Ecuador	Erick Barrondo; Guatemala	Horacio Nava; Mexico
High jump	Derek Drouin; Canada	Michael Mason; Canada	Donald Thomas; Bahamas
Pole vault	Shawnacy Barber; Canada	Germán Chiaraviglio; Argentina	Mark Hollis; United States
Pole vault	Shawnacy Barber; Canada	Germán Chiaraviglio; Argentina	Jacob Blankenship; United States
Long jump ^{†}	Jeffery Henderson; United States	Marquise Goodwin; United States	Emiliano Lasa; Uruguay
Triple jump	Pedro Pablo Pichardo; Cuba	Leevan Sands; Bahamas	Ernesto Revé; Cuba
Shot put	O'Dayne Richards; Jamaica	Tim Nedow; Canada	Germán Lauro; Argentina
Discus throw	Fedrick Dacres; Jamaica	Ronald Julião; Brazil	Russell Winger; United States
Hammer throw	Kibwe Johnson; United States	Roberto Janet; Cuba	Conor McCullough; United States
Javelin throw	Keshorn Walcott; Trinidad and Tobago	Riley Dolezal; United States	Júlio César de Oliveira; Brazil
Decathlon	Damian Warner; Canada	Kurt Felix; Grenada	Luiz Alberto de Araújo; Brazil

=== Women's events ===
Event	Gold	Silver	Bronze
100 metres	Sherone Simpson; Jamaica	Ángela Tenorio; Ecuador	Barbara Pierre; United States
200 metres	Kaylin Whitney; United States	Kyra Jefferson; United States	Simone Facey; Jamaica
400 metres	Kendall Baisden; United States	Shakima Wimbley; United States	Kineke Alexander; Saint Vincent and the Grenadines
800 metres	Melissa Bishop; Canada	Alysia Montaño; United States	Flávia de Lima; Brazil
1500 metres	Muriel Coneo; Colombia	Nicole Sifuentes; Canada	Sasha Gollish; Canada
5000 metres	Juliana Paula dos Santos; Brazil	Brenda Flores; Mexico	Kellyn Taylor; United States
10,000 metres	Brenda Flores; Mexico	Desiree Davila; United States	Lanni Marchant; Canada
100 m hurdles	Queen Harrison; United States	Tenaya Jones; United States	Nikkita Holder; Canada
400 m hurdles	Shamier Little; United States	Sarah Wells; Canada	Déborah Rodríguez; Uruguay
3000 m steeplechase	Ashley Higginson; United States	Shalaya Kipp; United States	Geneviève Lalonde; Canada
4 × 100 m relay	United States; Barbara Pierre; LaKeisha Lawson; Morolake Akinosun; Kaylin Whitney	Jamaica; Samantha Henry-Robinson; Kerron Stewart; Schillonie Calvert; Simone Facey; Sherone Simpson	Canada; Crystal Emmanuel; Kimberly Hyacinthe; Jellisa Westney; Khamica Bingham
4 × 400 m relay	United States; Shamier Little; Kyra Jefferson; Shakima Wimbley; Kendall Baisden; Alysia Montaño	Jamaica; Anastasia Le-Roy; Verone Chambers; Chrisann Gordon; Bobby-Gaye Wilkins	Canada; Brianne Theisen-Eaton; Taylor Sharpe; Sage Watson; Sarah Wells; Audrey Jean-Baptiste
Marathon	Adriana Aparecida da Silva; Brazil	Lindsay Flanagan; United States	Rachel Hannah; Canada
20 km walk	María Guadalupe González; Mexico	Érica de Sena; Brazil	Paola Pérez; Ecuador
High jump	Levern Spencer; Saint Lucia	Priscilla Frederick; Antigua and Barbuda	Akela Jones; Barbados
Pole vault	Yarisley Silva; Cuba	Fabiana Murer; Brazil	Jenn Suhr; United States
Long jump	Christabel Nettey; Canada	Bianca Stuart; Bahamas	Sha'Keela Saunders; United States
Triple jump	Caterine Ibargüen; Colombia	Keila Costa; Brazil	Yosiris Urrutia; Colombia
Shot put	Cleopatra Borel; Trinidad and Tobago	Jillian Camarena-Williams; United States	Natalia Ducó; Chile
Discus throw	Denia Caballero; Cuba	Yaime Pérez; Cuba	Gia Lewis-Smallwood; United States
Hammer throw	Rosa Rodríguez; Venezuela	Amber Campbell; United States	Sultana Frizell; Canada
Javelin throw	Elizabeth Gleadle; Canada	Kara Winger; United States	Jucilene de Lima; Brazil
Heptathlon	Yorgelis Rodríguez; Cuba	Heather Miller; United States	Vanessa Spínola; Brazil

== Badminton ==
Event	Gold	Silver	Bronze
Men's singles	Kevin Cordón; Guatemala	Andrew D’Souza; Canada	Osleni Guerrero; Cuba
Men's singles	Kevin Cordón; Guatemala	Andrew D’Souza; Canada	Howard Shu; United States
Women's singles	Michelle Li; Canada	Rachel Honderich; Canada	Iris Wang; United States
Women's singles	Michelle Li; Canada	Rachel Honderich; Canada	Jamie Subandhi; United States
Men's doubles	United States; Phillip Chew; Sattawat Pongnairat	Brazil; Hugo Arthuso; Daniel Paiola	Dominican Republic; Willian Cabrera; Nelson Javier
Men's doubles	United States; Phillip Chew; Sattawat Pongnairat	Brazil; Hugo Arthuso; Daniel Paiola	Mexico; Job Castillo; Lino Muñoz
Women's doubles	United States; Eva Lee; Paula Lynn Obañana	Brazil; Lohaynny Vicente; Luana Vicente	Canada; Rachel Honderich; Michelle Li
Women's doubles	United States; Eva Lee; Paula Lynn Obañana	Brazil; Lohaynny Vicente; Luana Vicente	Canada; Alex Bruce; Phyllis Chan
Mixed doubles	United States; Phillip Chew; Jamie Subandhi	Canada; Toby Ng; Alex Bruce	Brazil; Alex Yuwan Tjong; Lohaynny Vicente
Mixed doubles	United States; Phillip Chew; Jamie Subandhi	Canada; Toby Ng; Alex Bruce	Peru; Mario Cuba; Katherine Winder

== Baseball ==
Event	Gold	Silver	Bronze
Men's tournament	Canada	United States	Cuba
Women's tournament	United States	Canada	Venezuela

== Basketball ==
Event	Gold	Silver	Bronze
Men's tournament	Brazil; Ricardo Fischer; Rafael Luz; Augusto César Lima; Larry Taylor; Vítor Benite; Carlos Nascimento; Rafael Hettsheimeir; Rafael Souza; João Paulo Batista; Leonardo Meindl; Marcus Vinicius Toledo	Canada; Anthony Bennett; Sim Bhullar; Dillon Brooks; Junior Cadougan; Aaron Doornekamp; Melvin Ejim; Carl English; Brady Heslip; Daniel Mullings; Jamal Murray; Andrew Nicholson; Kyle Wiltjer	United States; Ron Baker; Malcolm Brogdon; Bobby Brown; Ryan Hollins; Keith Langford; Shawn Long; Taurean Prince; Anthony Randolph; Kaleb Tarczewski; Romelo Trimble; Denzel Valentine; Damien Wilkins
Women's tournament	Canada; Natalie Achonwa; Miranda Ayim; Nirra Fields; Kim Gaucher; Miah-Marie Langlois; Lizanne Murphy; Kia Nurse; Katherine Plouffe; Michelle Plouffe; Nayo Raincock-Ekunwe; Tamara Tatham; Shona Thorburn	United States; Sophie Brunner; Alaina Coates; Caroline Coyer; Linnae Harper; Moriah Jefferson; Stephanie Mavunga; Tiffany Mitchell; Kelsey Plum; Taya Reimer; Breanna Stewart; Shatori Walker-Kimbrough; Courtney Williams	Cuba; Fransy Ochoa; Ineidis Casanova; Anisleidy Galindo; Oyanaisy Gelis; Arlenys Romero; Yamara Amargo; Arlety Povea; Marlene Cepeda; Clenia Noblet; Zuleira Aties; Leidys Oquendo; Suchitel Ávila

== Beach volleyball ==
Event	Gold	Silver	Bronze
Men's tournament	Mexico; Rodolfo Ontiveros; Juan Virgen	Brazil; Vitor Araujo; Álvaro Morais Filho	Cuba; Nivaldo Diaz; Sergio González
Women's tournament	Argentina; Ana Gallay; Georgina Klug	Cuba; Lianma Flores; Leila Martinez	Brazil; Carolina Horta; Liliane Maestrini

== Bowling ==
Event	Gold	Silver	Bronze
Men's singles	Marcelo Suartz; Brazil	Amleto Monacelli; Venezuela	Dan MacLelland; Canada
Men's singles	Marcelo Suartz; Brazil	Amleto Monacelli; Venezuela	Devin Bidwell; United States
Men's doubles	Canada; François Lavoie; Dan MacLelland	Colombia; Jaime González; Manuel Otalora	United States; Devin Bidwell; Tommy Jones
Women's singles	Shannon Pluhowsky; United States	Aumi Guerra; Dominican Republic	Liz Johnson; United States
Women's singles	Shannon Pluhowsky; United States	Aumi Guerra; Dominican Republic	Rocio Restrepo; Colombia
Women's doubles	Colombia; Clara Guerrero; Rocio Restrepo	United States; Liz Johnson; Shannon Pluhowsky	Venezuela; Patricia de Faria; Karen Marcano

== Boxing ==
=== Men's events ===
Event	Gold	Silver	Bronze
Light flyweight	Joselito Velázquez; Mexico	Joahnys Argilagos; Cuba	Yoel Finol; Venezuela
Light flyweight	Joselito Velázquez; Mexico	Joahnys Argilagos; Cuba	Victor Santillan; Dominican Republic
Flyweight	Antonio Vargas; United States	Yosvany Veitía; Cuba	Ceiber Ávila; Colombia
Flyweight	Antonio Vargas; United States	Yosvany Veitía; Cuba	David Jimenez; Costa Rica
Bantamweight	Andy Cruz Gomez; Cuba	Héctor García; Dominican Republic	Kenny Lally; Canada
Bantamweight	Andy Cruz Gomez; Cuba	Héctor García; Dominican Republic	Francisco Martinez; United States
Lightweight	Lázaro Álvarez; Cuba	Lindolfo Delgado; Mexico	Kevin Luna; Guatemala
Lightweight	Lázaro Álvarez; Cuba	Lindolfo Delgado; Mexico	José Rosario; Puerto Rico
Light welterweight	Arthur Biyarslanov; Canada	Yasniel Toledo; Cuba	Joedison Teixeira; Brazil
Light welterweight	Arthur Biyarslanov; Canada	Yasniel Toledo; Cuba	Luis Arcon; Venezuela
Welterweight	Gabriel Maestre; Venezuela	Roniel Iglesias; Cuba	Juan Ramón Solano; Dominican Republic
Welterweight	Gabriel Maestre; Venezuela	Roniel Iglesias; Cuba	Alberto Palmetta; Argentina
Middleweight	Arlen López; Cuba	Jorge Vivas; Colombia	Misael Rodríguez; Mexico
Middleweight	Arlen López; Cuba	Jorge Vivas; Colombia	Endry Saavedra; Venezuela
Light heavyweight	Julio César la Cruz; Cuba	Albert Ramirez Duran; Venezuela	Juan Carlos Carrillo; Colombia
Light heavyweight	Julio César la Cruz; Cuba	Albert Ramirez Duran; Venezuela	Rogelio Romero; Mexico
Heavyweight	Erislandy Savón; Cuba	Deivi Julio; Colombia	Samir El-Mais; Canada
Heavyweight	Erislandy Savón; Cuba	Deivi Julio; Colombia	Miguel Veliz; Chile
Super heavyweight	Lenier Pero; Cuba	Edgar Muñoz; Venezuela	Cam Awesome; United States
Super heavyweight	Lenier Pero; Cuba	Edgar Muñoz; Venezuela	Rafael Lima; Brazil

=== Women's events ===
Event	Gold	Silver	Bronze
Flyweight	Mandy Bujold; Canada	Marlen Esparza; United States	Monica Gonzalez Rivera; Puerto Rico
Flyweight	Mandy Bujold; Canada	Marlen Esparza; United States	Ingrit Valencia; Colombia
Light welterweight	Caroline Veyre; Canada	Dayana Sánchez; Argentina	Victoria Torres; Mexico
Light welterweight	Caroline Veyre; Canada	Dayana Sánchez; Argentina	Mirquin Sena; Dominican Republic
Light heavyweight	Claressa Shields; United States	Yenebier Guillén; Dominican Republic	Ariane Fortin; Canada
Light heavyweight	Claressa Shields; United States	Yenebier Guillén; Dominican Republic	Lucía Pérez; Argentina

== Canoeing ==
=== Slalom ===
Event	Gold	Silver	Bronze
Men's C-1	Casey Eichfeld; United States	Cameron Smedley; Canada	Felipe Borges; Brazil
Men's C-2	United States; Devin McEwan; Casey Eichfeld	Brazil; Charles Correa; Anderson Oliveira	Argentina; Lucas Rossi; Sebastián Rossi
Men's K-1	Michal Smolen; United States	Pedro Gonçalves da Silva; Brazil	Ben Hayward; Canada
Women's C-1	Ana Sátila; Brazil	Colleen Hickey; United States	Haley Daniels; Canada
Women's K-1	Jazmyne Denhollander; Canada	Ana Sátila; Brazil	Ashley Nee; United States

=== Sprint ===
Men

Event	Gold	Silver	Bronze
Men's C-1 200 m	Isaquias Queiroz; Brazil	Jason McCoombs; Canada	Arnold Rodriguez; Cuba
Men's C-1 1000 m	Isaquias Queiroz; Brazil	Mark Oldershaw; Canada	Everardo Cristóbal; Mexico
Men's C-2 1000 m	Canada; Benjamin Russell; Gabriel Beauchesne-Sévigny	Brazil; Erlon de Souza Silva; Isaquias Queiroz	Cuba; Serguey Torres; José Carlos Bulnes
Men's K-1 200 m	Mark de Jonge; Canada	Edson Isaias Freitas da Silva; Brazil	César de Cesare; Ecuador
Men's K-1 1000 m	Jorge García; Cuba	Daniel Dal Bo; Argentina	Adam van Koeverden; Canada
Men's K-2 200 m	Argentina; Ezequiel Di Giacomo; Rubén Voisard	Cuba; Fidel Vargas; Reinier Torres	Brazil; Hans Heinrich Mallmann; Edson Isaias Freitas da Silva
Men's K-2 200 m	Argentina; Ezequiel Di Giacomo; Rubén Voisard	Cuba; Fidel Vargas; Reinier Torres	Canada; Mark de Jonge; Pierre-Luc Poulin
Men's K-2 1000 m	Cuba; Jorge García; Reinier Torres	Argentina; Pablo de Torres; Gonzalo Carreras	Brazil; Celso Dias de Oliveira Junior; Vagner Junior Souta
Men's K-4 1000 m	Cuba; Jorge García; Renier Mora; Reinier Torres; Alex Menendez	Brazil; Roberto Maehler; Vagner Junior Souta; Celso Dias de Oliveira Junior; Gilvan Bitencourt Ribeiro	Argentina; Daniel Dal Bo; Juan Ignacio Caceres; Pablo de Torres; Gonzalo Carreras

Women

Event	Gold	Silver	Bronze
Women's C-1 200 m	Laurence Vincent Lapointe; Canada	Anggie Avegno; Ecuador	Valdenice Conceição; Brazil
Women's K-1 200 m	Yusmari Mengana; Cuba	Michelle Russell; Canada	Sabrina Ameghino; Argentina
Women's K-1 500 m	Yusmari Mengana; Cuba	Michelle Russell; Canada	Ana Paula Vergutz; Brazil
Women's K-2 500 m	Cuba; Yusmari Mengana; Yurieni Guerra	Argentina; Sabrina Ameghino; Alexandra Keresztesi	Mexico; Karina Alanís; Maricela Montemayor
Women's K-4 500 m	Canada; Émilie Fournel; Kathleen Fraser; Michelle Russell; Hannah Vaughan	Cuba; Daniela Martin; Yurieni Guerra; Lisandra Torres; Jessica Hernandez	Argentina; Maria Magdalena Garro; Sabrina Ameghino; Alexandra Keresztesi; Brenda Rojas

== Cycling ==
=== BMX ===
Event	Gold	Silver	Bronze
Men	Tory Nyhaug; Canada	Alfredo Campo; Ecuador	Nicholas Long; United States
Women	Felicia Stancil; United States	Doménica Azuero; Ecuador	Mariana Díaz; Argentina

=== Mountain biking ===
Event	Gold	Silver	Bronze
Men's cross-country	Raphaël Gagné; Canada	Catriel Soto; Argentina	Stephen Ettinger; United States
Women's cross-country	Emily Batty; Canada	Catharine Prendel; Canada	Erin Huck; United States

=== Road cycling ===
Event	Gold	Silver	Bronze
Men's road race	Miguel Ubeto; Venezuela	Eric Marcotte; United States	Guillaume Boivin; Canada
Women's road race	Jasmin Glaesser; Canada	Marlies Mejías; Cuba	Allison Beveridge; Canada
Men's time trial	Hugo Houle; Canada	Ignacio Prado; Mexico	Sean MacKinnon; Canada
Women's time trial	Kelly Catlin; United States	Jasmin Glaesser; Canada	Evelyn García; El Salvador

=== Track cycling ===
Event	Gold	Silver	Bronze
Men's team pursuit	Colombia; Juan Arango; Arles Castro; Fernando Gaviria; Jhonatan Restrepo	Argentina; Mauro Agostini; Maximiliano Richeze; Juan Merlos; Adrian Richeze; Walter Pérez	Canada; Eric Johnstone; Sean MacKinnon; Rémi Pelletier-Roy; Edward Veal; Adam Jamieson
Women's team pursuit	Canada; Allison Beveridge; Laura Brown; Jasmin Glaesser; Kirsti Lay	United States; Jennifer Valente; Sarah Hammer; Kelly Catlin; Lauren Tamayo; Ruth Winder	Mexico; Sofía Arreola; Íngrid Drexel; Mayra Del Rocio Rocha; Lizbeth Salazar
Men's individual sprint	Hugo Barrette; Canada	Njisane Phillip; Trinidad and Tobago	Hersony Canelón; Venezuela
Women's individual sprint	Monique Sullivan; Canada	Kate O'Brien; Canada	Juliana Gaviria; Colombia
Men's team sprint	Canada; Hugo Barrette; Evan Carey; Joseph Veloce	Venezuela; Hersony Canelón; César Marcano; Ángel Pulgar	Brazil; Flavio Cipriano; Kacio Freitas; Hugo Osteti
Women's team sprint	Canada; Kate O'Brien; Monique Sullivan	Cuba; Lisandra Guerra; Marlies Mejías	Colombia; Diana García; Juliana Gaviria
Men's keirin	Fabián Puerta; Colombia	Hersony Canelón; Venezuela	Hugo Barrette; Canada
Women's keirin	Monique Sullivan; Canada	Lisandra Guerra; Cuba	Juliana Gaviria; Colombia
Men's omnium	Fernando Gaviria; Colombia	Ignacio Prado; Mexico	Gideoni Monteiro; Brazil
Women's omnium	Sarah Hammer; United States	Jasmin Glaesser; Canada	Marlies Mejías; Cuba

== Diving ==
=== Men's events ===
Event	Gold	Silver	Bronze
3 metre springboard	Rommel Pacheco; Mexico	Jahir Ocampo; Mexico	Philippe Gagné; Canada
10 metre platform	Iván García; Mexico	Víctor Ortega; Colombia	Jonathan Ruvalcaba; Mexico
Synchronized 3 metre springboard	Mexico; Jahir Ocampo; Rommel Pacheco	Canada; Philippe Gagné; François Imbeau-Dulac	United States; Cory Bowersox; Zachary Nees
Synchronized 10 metre platform	Cuba; Jeinkler Aguirre; José Guerra	Canada; Philippe Gagné; Vincent Riendeau	Colombia; Víctor Ortega; Juan Guillermo Rios

=== Women's events ===
Event	Gold	Silver	Bronze
3 metre springboard	Jennifer Abel; Canada	Pamela Ware; Canada	Dolores Hernández; Mexico
10 metre platform	Paola Espinosa; Mexico	Roseline Filion; Canada	Meaghan Benfeito; Canada
Synchronized 3 metre springboard	Mexico; Paola Espinosa; Dolores Hernández	Canada; Jennifer Abel; Pamela Ware	United States; Deidre Freeman; Maren Taylor
Synchronized 10 metre platform	Canada; Meaghan Benfeito; Roseline Filion	Brazil; Ingrid de Oliveira; Giovanna Pedroso	Mexico; Paola Espinosa; Alejandra Orozco

== Equestrian ==
Event	Gold	Silver	Bronze
Individual dressage	Steffen Peters on Legolas 92; United States	Laura Graves on Verdades; United States	Christopher von Martels on Zilverstar; Canada
Team dressage	United States; Sabine Schut-Kery on Sanceo; Kimberly Herslow on Rosmarin; Laura Graves on Verdades; Steffen Peters on Legolas 92	Canada; Christopher von Martels on Zilverstar; Brittany Fraser on All in Megan Lane on Caravella; Belinda Trussell on Anton	Brazil; Leandro da Silva on Di Caprio; Sarah Waddell on Donelly 3 Joao Victor Marcari on Xama dos pinhais Joao Paulo dos Santos on Veleiro do top
Individual eventing	Marilyn Little on Rf Scandalous; United States	Jessica Phoenix on Pavarotti; Canada	Ruy Fonseca on Tom Bombadill Too; Brazil
Team eventing	United States; Marilyn Little on Rf Scandalous; Boyd Martin on Pancho Villa; Phillip Dutton on Fernhill Fugitive; Lauren Kieffer on Meadowbrook's Scarlett	Brazil; Ruy Fonseca on Tom Bombadill Too; Carlos Parro on Caulcourt Landline; Márcio Jorge on Lissy Mac Wayer; Henrique Plombon on Land Quenotte	Canada; Kathryn Robinson on Let It Bee; Jessica Phoenix on Pavarotti; Colleen Loach on Qorry Blue D'Argouges; Waylon Roberts on Bill Owen
Individual jumping	McLain Ward on Rothchild; United States	Andrés Rodríguez on Darlon Van Groenhove; Venezuela	Lauren Hough on Ohlala; United States
Team jumping	Canada; Yann Candele on Showgirl; Tiffany Foster on Tripple X III; Eric Lamaze on Coco Bongo; Ian Millar on Dixson	Argentina; Ramiro Quintana on Whitney; Matías Albarracín on Cannavaro 9 Luis Pedro Birabén on Abunola; José Maria Larocca on Cornet du Lys	United States; McLain Ward on Rothchild; Georgina Bloomberg on Lilli; Lauren Hough on Ohlala; Kent Farrington on Gazelle

== Fencing ==
=== Men's events ===
Event	Gold	Silver	Bronze
Individual épée	Rubén Limardo; Venezuela	José Félix Domínguez; Argentina	Hugues Boisvert-Simard; Canada
Individual épée	Rubén Limardo; Venezuela	José Félix Domínguez; Argentina	Jason Pryor; United States
Team épée	Venezuela; Rubén Limardo; Francisco Limardo; Silvio Fernández	United States; Yeisser Ramirez; Jason Pryor; Benjamin Bratton	Cuba; Yunior Reytor; Reynier Henrique; Ringo Quintero
Individual foil	Alexander Massialas; United States	Gerek Meinhardt; United States	Ghislain Perrier; Brazil
Individual foil	Alexander Massialas; United States	Gerek Meinhardt; United States	Daniel Gómez; Mexico
Team foil	United States; Miles Chamley-Watson; Alexander Massialas; Gerek Meinhardt	Brazil; Ghislain Perrier; Fernando Scavasin; Guilherme Toldo	Mexico; Raul Arizaga; Jesús Beltran; Daniel Gómez
Individual sabre	Eli Dershwitz; United States	Joseph Polossifakis; Canada	Renzo Agresta; Brazil
Individual sabre	Eli Dershwitz; United States	Joseph Polossifakis; Canada	Ricardo Bustamante; Argentina
Team sabre	United States; Eli Dershwitz; Daryl Homer; Jeff Spear	Canada; Shaul Gordon; Joseph Polossifakis; Mark Peros	Argentina; Ricardo Bustamante; Pascual Di Tella; Stefano Lucchetti

=== Women's events ===
Event	Gold	Silver	Bronze
Individual épée	Katharine Holmes; United States	Violeta Ramírez Peguero; Dominican Republic	Nathalie Moellhausen; Brazil
Individual épée	Katharine Holmes; United States	Violeta Ramírez Peguero; Dominican Republic	María Martínez; Venezuela
Team épée	United States; Anna van Brummen; Katharine Holmes; Katarzyna Trzopek	Venezuela; María Martínez; Eliana Lugo; Dayana Martinez	Brazil; Nathalie Moellhausen; Amanda Simeão; Rayssa Costa
Individual foil	Lee Kiefer; United States	Saskia Loretta Garcia; Colombia	Alanna Goldie; Canada
Individual foil	Lee Kiefer; United States	Saskia Loretta Garcia; Colombia	Nicole Ross; United States
Team foil	Canada; Alanna Goldie; Eleanor Harvey; Kelleigh Ryan	United States; Lee Kiefer; Nzingha Prescod; Nicole Ross	Mexico; Denisse Hernández; Nataly Michel; Melissa Rebolledo
Individual sabre	Dagmara Wozniak; United States	Alejandra Benítez; Venezuela	Gabriella Page; Canada
Individual sabre	Dagmara Wozniak; United States	Alejandra Benítez; Venezuela	María Belén Pérez Maurice; Argentina
Team sabre	United States; Ibtihaj Muhammad; Dagmara Wozniak; Mariel Zagunis	Mexico; Úrsula González; Paola Pliego; Julieta Toledo	Venezuela; Alejandra Benítez; Milagros Pastran; Shia Rodríguez

== Field hockey ==
Event	Gold	Silver	Bronze
Men's tournament	Argentina; Juan Manuel Vivaldi; Gonzalo Peillat; Juan Gilardi; Pedro Ibarra; Facundo Callioni; Matías Paredes; Joaquin Menini; Lucas Vila; Ignacio Ortiz; Juan Martín López; Nicolas Della Torre; Isidoro Ibarra; Matias Rey; Manuel Brunet; Agustin Mazzili; Lucas Rossi	Canada; Brenden Bissett; David Carter; Taylor Curran; Adam Froese; Matthew Guest; Gabriel Ho-Garcia; David Jameson; Gordon Johnston; Ben Martin; Devohn Noronha-Teixeira; Sukhi Panesar; Mark Pearson; Matthew Sarmento; Iain Smythe; Scott Tupper; Paul Wharton	Chile; Richardo Achondo; Prada A. Berczely; Fernando Binder Wiener; Felipe Eggers; Andres Fuenzalida; Ignacio Gajardo; Adrian Henriquez; Thomas Kannegiesser; Seba Kapsch; Vicente Martin Tarud; Fernando Renz; Nicolas Renz; Sven Richter; Martin Rodriguez Ducaud; Raimundo Valenzuela; Jaime Zarhi
Women's tournament	United States; Jaclyn Briggs; Lauren Crandall; Rachel Dawson; Katelyn Falgowski; Stefanie Fee; Melissa González; Michelle Kasold; Kelsey Kolojejchick; Alyssa Manley; Kathleen O'Donnell; Julia Reinprecht; Katherine Reinprecht; Paige Selenski; Michelle Vittese; Jill Witmer; Emily Wold	Argentina; Belén Succi; Macarena Rodríguez; Jimena Cedrés; Martina Cavallero; Delfina Merino; Agustina Habif; Florencia Habif; Rocío Sánchez Moccia; Agustina Albertarrio; Luciana Molina; Pilar Romang; Paula Ortiz; Noel Barrionuevo; Julia Gomes Fantasia; Josefina Sruoga; Florencia Mutio	Canada; Thea Culley; Kate Gillis; Hannah Haughn; Danielle Hennig; Karli Johansen; Shanlee Johnston; Sara McManus (field hockey); Stephanie Norlander; Abigail Raye; Maddie Secco; Natalie Sourisseau; Brienne Stairs; Holly Stewart; Alex Thicke; Kaitlyn Williams; Amanda Woodcroft

== Football ==
Event	Gold	Silver	Bronze
Men's tournament	Uruguay	Mexico	Brazil
Women's tournament	Brazil	Colombia	Mexico

== Gymnastics ==
=== Artistic gymnastics ===
==== Men's events ====
Event	Gold	Silver	Bronze
Individual all-around	Sam Mikulak; United States	Manrique Larduet; Cuba	Jossimar Calvo; Colombia
Team all-around	United States; Marvin Kimble; Steven Legendre; Samuel Mikulak; Paul Ruggeri; Donnell Whittenburg	Brazil; Francisco Junior; Caio Souza; Lucas Bitencourt; Arthur Zanetti; Arthur Mariano	Colombia; Carlos Calvo; Jossimar Calvo; Jorge Hugo Giraldo; Didier Lugo; Jhonny Muñoz
Floor	Jorge Vega; Guatemala	Donnell Whittenburg; United States	Sam Mikulak; United States
Pommel horse	Marvin Kimble; United States; Jossimar Calvo; Colombia	None awarded	Daniel Corral; Mexico
Rings	Arthur Zanetti; Brazil	Donnell Whittenburg; United States	Manrique Larduet; Cuba
Vault	Manrique Larduet; Cuba	Donnell Whittenburg; United States	Caio Souza; Brazil
Parallel bars	Jossimar Calvo; Colombia	Manrique Larduet; Cuba	Sam Mikulak; United States
Horizontal bar	Jossimar Calvo; Colombia	Kevin Lytwyn; Canada	Paul Ruggeri; United States

==== Women's events ====
Event	Gold	Silver	Bronze
Individual all-around	Ellie Black; Canada	Madison Desch; United States	Flávia Saraiva; Brazil
Team all-around	United States; Madison Desch; Rachel Gowey; Amelia Hundley; Emily Schild; Megan Skaggs	Canada; Ellie Black; Maegan Chant; Madison Copiak; Isabela Onyshko; Victoria Woo	Brazil; Lorrane Santos; Leticia Costa; Flávia Saraiva; Daniele Hypólito; Julie Kim
Vault	Marcia Videaux; Cuba	Yamilet Peña; Dominican Republic	Ellie Black; Canada
Uneven bars	Rachel Gowey; United States	Jessica López; Venezuela	Amelia Hundley; United States
Balance beam	Ellie Black; Canada	Megan Skaggs; United States	Victoria Woo; Canada
Floor	Ellie Black; Canada	Amelia Hundley; United States	Ana Sofía Gómez; Guatemala

=== Rhythmic gymnastics ===
==== Individual ====
Event	Gold	Silver	Bronze
Individual all-around	Laura Zeng; United States	Jasmine Kerber; United States	Patricia Bezzoubenko; Canada
Hoop	Laura Zeng; United States	Jasmine Kerber; United States	Angélica Kvieczynski; Brazil
Ball	Laura Zeng; United States	Jasmine Kerber; United States	Karla Diaz; Mexico
Clubs	Laura Zeng; United States	Patricia Bezzoubenko; Canada	Jasmine Kerber; United States
Ribbon	Laura Zeng; United States	Jasmine Kerber; United States	Angélica Kvieczynski; Brazil

==== Group ====
Event	Gold	Silver	Bronze
Group all-around	Brazil; Dayane Amaral; Morgana Gmach; Emanuelle Lima; Jessica Maier; Ana Paula Ribeiro; Beatriz Pomini	United States; Kiana Eide; Alisa Kano; Natalie McGiffert; Jennifer Rokhman; Monica Rokhman; Kristen Shaldybin	Cuba; Claudia Arjona; Zenia Fernandez; Melissa Kindelan; Martha Perez; Adriana Ramirez; Legna Savon
5 ribbons	Brazil; Dayane Amaral; Morgana Gmach; Emanuelle Lima; Jessica Maier; Ana Paula Ribeiro; Beatriz Pomini	United States; Kiana Eide; Alisa Kano; Natalie McGiffert; Jennifer Rokhman; Monica Rokhman; Kristen Shaldybin	Canada; Katrina Cameron; Maya Kojevnikov; Lucinda Nowell; Vanessa Panov; Anjelika Reznik; Victoria Reznik
6 clubs + 2 hoops	United States; Kiana Eide; Alisa Kano; Natalie McGiffert; Jennifer Rokhman; Monica Rokhman; Kristen Shaldybin	Brazil; Dayane Amaral; Morgana Gmach; Emanuelle Lima; Jessica Maier; Ana Paula Ribeiro; Beatriz Pomini	Canada; Katrina Cameron; Maya Kojevnikov; Lucinda Nowell; Vanessa Panov; Anjelika Reznik; Victoria Reznik

=== Trampoline ===
Event	Gold	Silver	Bronze
Men's individual	Keegan Soehn; Canada	Steven Gluckstein; United States	Ángel Hernández; Colombia
Women's individual	Rosie MacLennan; Canada	Dafne Navarro; Mexico	Karen Cockburn; Canada

== Golf ==
Event	Gold	Silver	Bronze
Men's individual	Marcelo Rozo; Colombia	Tommy Cocha; Argentina	Felipe Aguilar; Chile
Women's individual	Mariajo Uribe; Colombia	Andrea Lee; United States	Julieta Granada; Paraguay
Mixed team	Colombia; Mateo Gomez; Paola Moreno; Marcelo Rozo; Mariajo Uribe	United States; Kristen Gillman; Beau Hossler; Andrea Lee; Lee McCoy	Argentina; Delfina Acosta; Manuela Carbajo Re; Tommy Cocha; Alejandro Tosti

== Handball ==
Event	Gold	Silver	Bronze
Men's tournament	Brazil; Maik Santos; Henrique Teixeira; Fernando Pacheco Filho; Bruno Santana; Raul Campos; Lucas Cândido; Diogo Hubner; Thiagus dos Santos; Alexandro Pozzer; Felipe Ribeiro; Fábio Chiuffa; Vinícius Teixeira; Oswaldo Guimarães; André Soares; César Almeida	Argentina; Matías Schulz; Federico Fernández; Federico Pizarro; Sebastián Simonet; Pablo Sebastián Portela; Diego Simonet; Pablo Simonet; Leonardo Facundo Querín; Federico Matías Vieyra; Fernando Gabriel García; Juan Pablo Fernández; Gonzalo Carou; Damián Migueles; Adrián Portela; Sergio Crevatin	Chile; Felipe Barrientos; Sebastián Ceballos; Alfredo Valenzuela; Pablo Baeza; Nicolás Jofre; Diego Reyes; Erik Caniu; Javier Frelijj; Cristián Moll Ramírez; Felipe Maurin; Guillermo Araya; Esteban Salinas; René Oliva; Rodrigo Salinas Muñoz; Marco Oneto
Women's tournament	Brazil; Alexandra do Nascimento; Samira Rocha; Daniela Piedade; Amanda de Andrade; Tamires Morena Lima; Fernanda da Silva; Ana Paula Rodrigues; Jéssica Quintino; Bárbara Arenhart; Francielle da Rocha; Mayssa Pessoa; Elaine Gomes; Jaqueline Anastácio; Célia Coppi; Deonise Cavaleiro	Argentina; Marisol Carratu; Lucía Haro; Manuela Pizzo; Luciana Salvado; Rocío Campigli; Amelia Belotti; Luciana Mendoza; Victoria Crivelli; Antonella Gambino; Valentina Kogan; Valeria Bianchi; Antonela Mena; Macarena Sans; Macarena Gandulfo; Elke Karsten	Uruguay; Patricia Ré; Paola Santos; Paula Fynn; Soledad Faedo; Alejandra Scarrone; Daniela Scarrone; Alejandra Ferrari; Camila Barreiro; Martina Barreiro; Eliana Falco; Federica Cura; Leticia Schinca; Camila Vázquez; Viviana Ferrari; Iara Grosso

== Judo ==
=== Men's events ===
Event	Gold	Silver	Bronze
Extra-lightweight (60 kg)	Lenin Preciado; Ecuador	Felipe Kitadai; Brazil	John Futtinico; Colombia
Extra-lightweight (60 kg)	Lenin Preciado; Ecuador	Felipe Kitadai; Brazil	Yandry Torres; Cuba
Half-lightweight (66 kg)	Charles Chibana; Brazil	Antoine Bouchard; Canada	Carlos Tondique; Cuba
Half-lightweight (66 kg)	Charles Chibana; Brazil	Antoine Bouchard; Canada	Fernando González; Argentina
Lightweight (73 kg)	Magdiel Estrada; Cuba	Alejandro Clara; Argentina	Augusto Miranda; Puerto Rico
Lightweight (73 kg)	Magdiel Estrada; Cuba	Alejandro Clara; Argentina	Arthur Margelidon; Canada
Half-middleweight (81 kg)	Travis Stevens; United States	Ivan Felipe Silva; Cuba	Pedro Castro; Colombia
Half-middleweight (81 kg)	Travis Stevens; United States	Ivan Felipe Silva; Cuba	Victor Penalber; Brazil
Middleweight (90 kg)	Tiago Camilo; Brazil	Asley González; Cuba	Jacob Larsen; United States
Middleweight (90 kg)	Tiago Camilo; Brazil	Asley González; Cuba	Isao Cárdenas; Mexico
Half-heavyweight (100 kg)	Luciano Corrêa; Brazil	Marc Deschenes; Canada	Hector Campos; Argentina
Half-heavyweight (100 kg)	Luciano Corrêa; Brazil	Marc Deschenes; Canada	José Armenteros; Cuba
Heavyweight (+100 kg)	David Moura; Brazil	Freddy Figueroa; Ecuador	Alex Garcia; Cuba
Heavyweight (+100 kg)	David Moura; Brazil	Freddy Figueroa; Ecuador	José Cuevas; Mexico

=== Women's events ===
Event	Gold	Silver	Bronze
Extra-lightweight (48 kg)	Dayaris Mestre Alvarez; Cuba	Paula Pareto; Argentina	Edna Carrillo; Mexico
Extra-lightweight (48 kg)	Dayaris Mestre Alvarez; Cuba	Paula Pareto; Argentina	Nathalia Brigida; Brazil
Half-lightweight (52 kg)	Érika Miranda; Brazil	Ecaterina Guica; Canada	Angelica Delgado; United States
Half-lightweight (52 kg)	Érika Miranda; Brazil	Ecaterina Guica; Canada	Gretter Romero; Cuba
Lightweight (57 kg)	Marti Malloy; United States	Catherine Beauchemin-Pinard; Canada	Rafaela Silva; Brazil
Lightweight (57 kg)	Marti Malloy; United States	Catherine Beauchemin-Pinard; Canada	Aliuska Ojeda; Cuba
Half-middleweight (63 kg)	Estefania Garcia; Ecuador	Stéfanie Tremblay; Canada	Maylin del Toro; Cuba
Half-middleweight (63 kg)	Estefania Garcia; Ecuador	Stéfanie Tremblay; Canada	Mariana Silva; Brazil
Middleweight (70 kg)	Kelita Zupancic; Canada	Onix Cortés; Cuba	Maria Portela; Brazil
Middleweight (70 kg)	Kelita Zupancic; Canada	Onix Cortés; Cuba	Yuri Alvear; Colombia
Half-heavyweight (78 kg)	Kayla Harrison; United States	Mayra Aguiar; Brazil	Yalennis Castillo; Cuba
Half-heavyweight (78 kg)	Kayla Harrison; United States	Mayra Aguiar; Brazil	Catherine Roberge; Canada
Heavyweight (+78 kg)	Idalys Ortiz; Cuba	Vanessa Zambotti; Mexico	Maria Suelen Altheman; Brazil
Heavyweight (+78 kg)	Idalys Ortiz; Cuba	Vanessa Zambotti; Mexico	Nina Cutro-Kelly; United States

== Karate ==
=== Men's events ===
Event	Gold	Silver	Bronze
60 kg	Douglas Brose; Brazil	Jovanni Martínez; Venezuela	Andrés Rendón; Colombia
60 kg	Douglas Brose; Brazil	Jovanni Martínez; Venezuela	Brandis Miyazaki; United States
67 kg	Julian Pinzas; Argentina	Deivis Ferreras; Dominican Republic	Maikel Noriega; Cuba
67 kg	Julian Pinzas; Argentina	Deivis Ferreras; Dominican Republic	Daniel Vargas; Mexico
75 kg	Thomas Scott; United States	Alexander Nicastro; Venezuela	Patrice Boily-Martineau; Canada
75 kg	Thomas Scott; United States	Alexander Nicastro; Venezuela	Franco Icasati; Argentina
84 kg	Miguel Amargos; Argentina	Jorge Merino; El Salvador	Andres Loor; Ecuador
84 kg	Miguel Amargos; Argentina	Jorge Merino; El Salvador	César Herrera; Venezuela
+84 kg	Franklin Mina; Ecuador	Anel Castillo; Dominican Republic	Jander Tiril; Cuba
+84 kg	Franklin Mina; Ecuador	Anel Castillo; Dominican Republic	Brian Irr; United States

=== Women's events ===
Event	Gold	Silver	Bronze
50 kg	Ana Villanueva; Dominican Republic	Gabriela Bruna; Chile	Jusleen Virk; Canada
50 kg	Ana Villanueva; Dominican Republic	Gabriela Bruna; Chile	Aline Souza; Brazil
55 kg	Valéria Kumizaki; Brazil	Kate Campbell; Canada	Jessy Reyes; Chile
55 kg	Valéria Kumizaki; Brazil	Kate Campbell; Canada	Alessandra Vindrola; Peru
61 kg	Alexandra Grande; Peru	Karina Díaz; Dominican Republic	Daniela Lepín; Chile
61 kg	Alexandra Grande; Peru	Karina Díaz; Dominican Republic	Merillela Arreola; Mexico
68 kg	Natália Brozulatto; Brazil	Xhunashi Caballero; Mexico	Priscilla Lazo Nieto; Ecuador
68 kg	Natália Brozulatto; Brazil	Xhunashi Caballero; Mexico	Omaira Molina; Venezuela
+68 kg	Valeria Echever; Ecuador	Camélie Boisvenue; Canada	Yeisy Piña Ordaz; Venezuela
+68 kg	Valeria Echever; Ecuador	Camélie Boisvenue; Canada	Isabela dos Santos; Brazil

== Modern pentathlon ==
Event	Gold	Silver	Bronze
Men's	Charles Fernandez; Guatemala	Ismael Hernandez Uscanga; Mexico	Nathan Schrimsher; United States
Women's	Yane Marques; Brazil	Tamara Vega; Mexico	Mayan Oliver; Mexico

== Racquetball ==
=== Men's events ===
Event	Gold	Silver	Bronze
Men's singles	Rocky Carson; United States	Álvaro Beltrán; Mexico	Conrrado Moscoso; Bolivia
Men's singles	Rocky Carson; United States	Álvaro Beltrán; Mexico	Daniel de la Rosa; Mexico
Men's doubles	United States; Jansen Allen; José Rojas	Bolivia; Conrrado Moscoso; Roland Keller	Canada; Vincent Gagnon; Tim Landeryou
Men's doubles	United States; Jansen Allen; José Rojas	Bolivia; Conrrado Moscoso; Roland Keller	Mexico; Álvaro Beltrán; Javier Moreno
Men's team	Mexico; Álvaro Beltrán; Daniel de la Rosa; Javier Moreno	United States; Jansen Allen; Jake Bredenbeck; Rocky Carson; José Rojas	Bolivia; Carlos Keller; Roland Keller; Conrrado Moscoso
Men's team	Mexico; Álvaro Beltrán; Daniel de la Rosa; Javier Moreno	United States; Jansen Allen; Jake Bredenbeck; Rocky Carson; José Rojas	Canada; Vincent Gagnon; Michael Green; Coby Iwaasa; Tim Landeryou

=== Women's events ===
Event	Gold	Silver	Bronze
Women's singles	Paola Longoria; Mexico	Maria J Vargas; Argentina	Maria Sotomayor; Ecuador
Women's singles	Paola Longoria; Mexico	Maria J Vargas; Argentina	Rhonda Rajsich; United States
Women's doubles	Mexico; Paola Longoria; Samantha Salas	Argentina; Maria J Vargas; Veronique Guillemette	Ecuador; Maria Sotomayor; Maria P Muñoz
Women's doubles	Mexico; Paola Longoria; Samantha Salas	Argentina; Maria J Vargas; Veronique Guillemette	United States; Rhonda Rajsich; Kim Russell
Women's team	Mexico; Paola Longoria; Samantha Salas	United States; Michelle Key; Rhonda Rajsich; Kim Russell	Canada; Frederique Lambert; Jen Saunders
Women's team	Mexico; Paola Longoria; Samantha Salas	United States; Michelle Key; Rhonda Rajsich; Kim Russell	Ecuador; Maria Sotomayor; Maria P Muñoz

== Roller sports ==
=== Figure skating ===
Event	Gold	Silver	Bronze
Men's free skating	Marcel Sturmer; Brazil	John Burchfield; United States	Diego Duque; Colombia
Women's free skating	Giselle Soler; Argentina	Talitha Haas; Brazil	Marisol Villarroel; Chile

=== Speed skating ===
Event	Gold	Silver	Bronze
Men's 200 metres time-trial	Emanuelle Silva; Chile	Pedro Causil; Colombia	Jorge Martínez; Mexico
Men's 500 metres	Pedro Causil; Colombia	Ezequiel Capellano; Argentina	Jorge Martínez; Mexico
Men's 10,000 metres points race	Mike Paez; Mexico	Juan Sebastian Paz; Colombia	Jordan Belchos; Canada
Women's 200 metres time-trial	Hellen Montoya; Colombia	Ingrid Factos; Ecuador	María José Moya; Chile
Women's 500 metres	Hellen Montoya; Colombia	Erin Jackson; United States	Ingrid Factos; Ecuador
Women's 10,000 metres points race	Maira Arias; Argentina	Emma Clare Townshend; Ecuador	Darian O'Neil; United States

== Rowing ==
=== Men's events ===
Event	Gold	Silver	Bronze
Single sculls	Cuba; Ángel Fournier	Canada; Rob Gibson	Argentina; Brian Rosso
Double sculls	Cuba; Eduardo Rubio; Ángel Fournier	Argentina; Rodrigo Murillo; Cristian Rosso	Canada; Pascal Lussier; Matthew Buie
Lightweight double sculls	Mexico; Alan Armenta; Alexis López	United States; Colin Ethridge; Austin Meyer	Cuba; Raul Hernández; Liosbel Hernández
Quadruple sculls	Canada; Julien Bahain; Matthew Buie; Will Dean; Rob Gibson	Cuba; Adrián Oquendo; Orlando Sotolongo; Eduardo Rubio; Ángel Fournier	Argentina; Brian Rosso; Osvaldo Suárez; Rodrigo Murillo; Cristian Rosso
Coxless pair	Argentina; Axel Haack; Diego Lopez; Chile; Félipe Leal; Oscar Vasquez	Not Awarded	Mexico; Diego Sánchez; Leopoldo Tejera
Coxless four	Canada; Will Crothers; Tim Schrijver; Kai Langerfeld; Conlin McCabe	Cuba; Manuel Suárez; Janier Concepción; Adrian Oquendo; Solaris Freire	Argentina; Joaquin Iwan; Francisco Esteras; Ivan Carino; Agustin Diaz
Lightweight coxless four	Canada; Maxwell Lattimer; Brendan Hodge; Nicolas Pratt; Eric Woelfl	United States; Robin Prendes; Peter Gibson; Andrew Weiland; Matthew O'Donoghue	Chile; Andres Oyarzun; Luis Saumann Salas; Felipe Cardenas; Bernardo Guerrero
Coxed eight	Canada; Julien Bahain; Martin Barakso; Will Crothers; Will Dean; Mike Evans; Jacob Koudys; Kai Langerfeld; Conlin McCabe; Tim Schrijver	Argentina; Joaquín Iwan; Axel Haack; Osvaldo Suarez; Francisco Esteras; Ivan Carino; Rodrigo Murillo; Diego Lopez; Agustin Diaz; Joel Infante	United States; Matthew Mahon; Brendan Harrington; Taylor Brown; Erick Winstead; David Eick; Kyle Peabody; Nareg Guregian; Kean Johnson; Sam Ojserkis

=== Women's events ===
Event	Gold	Silver	Bronze
Single sculls	Canada; Carling Zeeman	United States; Katherine McFetridge	Chile; Soraya Jadue
Lightweight single sculls	United States; Mary Jones	Brazil; Fabiana Beltrame	Argentina; Lucia Palermo
Double sculls	Canada; Kerry Maher-Shaffer; Antje Von Seydlitz	United States; Nicole Ritchie; Lindsay Meyer	Cuba; Aimee Hernandez; Yariulvis Cobas
Lightweight double sculls	Canada; Liz Fenje; Katherine Sauks	Cuba; Yislena Hernandez; Licet Hernandez	United States; Sara Giancola; Victoria Burke
Quadruple sculls	Canada; Kate Goodfellow; Kerry Maher-Shaffer; Carling Zeeman; Antje von Seydlitz	United States; Sarah Giancola; Lindsay Meyer; Nicole Ritchie; Victoria Burke	Argentina; Karina Wilvers; Maria Laura Abalo; Milka Kraljev; Maria Rohner
Coxless pair	United States; Emily Huelskamp; Molly Bruggeman	Chile; Melita Abraham; Antonia Abraham	Canada; Rosie DeBoef; Kristin Bauder

== Rugby sevens ==
Event	Gold	Silver	Bronze
Men's tournament	Canada; Sean White; Admir Cejvanovic; Michel Fuailefau; John Moonlight; Conor Trainor; Sean Duke; Phil Mack; Justin Douglas; Nathan Hirayama; Lucas Hammond; Harry Jones; Matthews Mullins	Argentina; Fernando Luna; Santiago Alvarez; German Schulz; Nicolas Bruzzone; Emiliano Boffelli; Gastón Revol; Bautista Ezcurra; Rodrigo Etchart; Franco Sabato; Juan Tuculet; Ramiro Finco; Axel Muller Aranda	United States; Carlin Isles; Patrick Blair; Brett Thompson; Garrett Bender; Mike Te'o; Stephen Tomasin; Will Holder; Ben Leatigaga; Nate Augspurger; Madison Hughes; Perry Baker; Martin Iosefo
Women's tournament	Canada; Brittany Benn; Kayla Moleschi; Karen Paquin; Kelly Russell; Ashley Steacy; Sara Kaljuvee; Jen Kish; Nadejda Popov; Ghislaine Landry; Hannah Darling; Magali Harvey; Natasha Watcham-Roy	United States; Megan Bonny; Kelly Griffin; Joanne Fa'avesi; Leyla Kelter; Richelle Stephens; Lauren Doyle; Kristen Thomas; Hannah Lopez; Melissa Fowler; Irene Gardner; Kate Zackary; Kathryn Johnson	Brazil; Juliana Esteves dos Santos; Bruna Lotufo; Beatriz Futuro Muhlbauer; Edna Santini; Paula Ishibashi; Isadora Cerullo; Claudia Lopes Teles; Haline Leme Scatrut; Angelica Pereira Gevaerd; Maira Bravo Behrendt; Raquel Kochhann; Mariana Barbosa Ramalho

== Sailing ==
=== Men's events ===
Event	Gold	Silver	Bronze
RS:X	Ricardo Winicki; Brazil	David Mier; Mexico	Mariano Reutemann; Argentina
Laser	Juan Maegli; Guatemala	Robert Scheidt; Brazil	Lee Parkhill; Canada

=== Women's events ===
Event	Gold	Silver	Bronze
RS:X	Patricia DaCosta; Brazil	Demita Vega; Mexico	Marion Lepert; United States
Laser Radial	Paige Railey; United States	Dolores Moreira; Uruguay	Fernanda Demetrio; Brazil
49erFX	Argentina; Maria Branz; Victoria Travascio	Brazil; Kahena Kunze; Martine Soffiatti	United States; Paris Henken; Helena Scutt

=== Open events ===
Event	Gold	Silver	Bronze
Sunfish	Jonathan Martinetti; Ecuador	Luke Ramsay; Canada	Andres Soruco; Chile
Snipe	Puerto Rico; Raul Rios De Choudens; Fernando Pacheco	Argentina; Diego Lipszyc; Luis Soubie	United States; Augie Diaz; Kathleen Tocke
Mixed Lightning	Argentina; Javier Conte; Nicolás Fracchia; María Salerno	United States; Justin Coplan; Caroline Patten; Danielle Prior	Brazil; María Altimira; Claudio Biekarck; Gunnar Ficker
Hobie 16	Guatemala; Jason Hess Castillo; Irene van Blerk	United States; Mark Modderman; Grace Modderman	Puerto Rico; Enrique Figueroa; Franchesca Ortega
J/24	Argentina; Federico Ambrus; Guillermo Bellinotto; Matias Pereira; Juan Pereyra	Canada; Sandy Andrews; David Jarvis; Terry McLaughlin; David Ogden	Chile; Sergio Baeza Roth; Marc Jux; Cristobal Lira; Matías Seguel

== Shooting ==
=== Men's events ===
Event	Gold	Silver	Bronze
10 metre air pistol	Felipe Almeida Wu; Brazil	Jay Shi; United States	Mario Vinueza; Ecuador
25 metre rapid fire pistol	Brad Balsley; United States	Emerson Duarte; Brazil	Douglas Gomez; Venezuela
50 metre pistol	Júlio Almeida; Brazil	Jorge Grau; Cuba	Marko Carrillo; Peru
10 metre air rifle	Connor Davis; United States	Julio Iemma; Venezuela	Bryant Wallizer; United States
50 metre rifle prone	Cassio Rippel; Brazil	Michael McPhail; United States	Michel Dion; Canada
50 metre rifle three positions	Reynier Estopiñán; Cuba	George Norton; United States	Ryan Anderson; United States
Trap	Francisco Boza; Peru	Fernando Borello; Argentina	Danilo Caro; Colombia
Double trap	Hebert Brol Cardenas; Guatemala	Sergio Piñero; Dominican Republic	Enrique Brol Cardenas; Guatemala
Skeet	Thomas Bayer; United States	Dustin Perry; United States	Juan Miguel Rodríguez; Cuba

=== Women's events ===
Event	Gold	Silver	Bronze
10 metre air pistol	Lynda Kiejko; Canada	Alejandra Zavala; Mexico	Lilian Castro; El Salvador
25 metre pistol	Lynda Kiejko; Canada	Sandra Uptagrafft; United States	Mariana Nava; Mexico
10 metre air rifle	Goretti Zumaya; Mexico	Fernanda Russo; Argentina	Eglis de la Cruz; Cuba
50 metre rifle three positions	Eglis Yaima Cruz; Cuba	Amelia Fournel; Argentina	Yarimar Mercado Martinez; Puerto Rico
Trap	Amanda Chudoba; Canada	Kayle Browning; United States	Kimberley Bowers; United States
Skeet	Kim Rhode; United States	Melisa Gil; Argentina	Francisca Crovetto; Chile

== Softball ==
Event	Gold	Silver	Bronze
Men's tournament	Canada	Venezuela	Argentina
Women's tournament	Canada	United States	Puerto Rico

== Squash ==
=== Men's events ===
Event	Gold	Silver	Bronze
Men's singles	Miguel Ángel Rodríguez; Colombia	Diego Elías; Peru	Shawn Delierre; Canada
Men's singles	Miguel Ángel Rodríguez; Colombia	Diego Elías; Peru	César Salazar; Mexico
Men's doubles	Colombia; Andrés Herrera; Juan Camilo Vargas	Canada; Andrew Schnell; Graeme Schnell	United States; Christopher Gordon; Christopher Hanson
Men's doubles	Colombia; Andrés Herrera; Juan Camilo Vargas	Canada; Andrew Schnell; Graeme Schnell	Peru; Andrés Duany; Diego Elías
Men's team	Canada; Shawn Delierre; Andrew Schnell; Graeme Schnell	Mexico; Eric Gálvez; César Salazar; Arturo Salazar	Argentina; Rodrigo Pezzota; Robertino Pezzota; Leandro Romiglio
Men's team	Canada; Shawn Delierre; Andrew Schnell; Graeme Schnell	Mexico; Eric Gálvez; César Salazar; Arturo Salazar	United States; Christopher Gordon; Christopher Hanson; Todd Harrity

=== Women's events ===
Event	Gold	Silver	Bronze
Women's singles	Amanda Sobhy; United States	Olivia Clyne; United States	Samantha Cornett; Canada
Women's singles	Amanda Sobhy; United States	Olivia Clyne; United States	Samantha Terán; Mexico
Women's doubles	United States; Natalie Grainger; Amanda Sobhy	Canada; Samantha Cornett; Nikki Todd	Colombia; Catalina Peláez; Laura Tovar
Women's doubles	United States; Natalie Grainger; Amanda Sobhy	Canada; Samantha Cornett; Nikki Todd	Mexico; Samantha Terán; Karla Urrutia
Women's team	United States; Olivia Clyne; Natalie Grainger; Amanda Sobhy	Canada; Samantha Cornett; Nikki Todd; Hollie Naughton	Mexico; Samantha Terán; Karla Urrutia; Diana García
Women's team	United States; Olivia Clyne; Natalie Grainger; Amanda Sobhy	Canada; Samantha Cornett; Nikki Todd; Hollie Naughton	Colombia; Catalina Peláez; Laura Tovar; Karol González

== Swimming ==
=== Men's events ===
Event	Gold	Silver	Bronze
50 m freestyle	Josh Schneider; United States	Bruno Fratus; Brazil	George Bovell; Trinidad and Tobago
100 m freestyle	Federico Grabich; Argentina	Santo Condorelli; Canada	Marcelo Chierighini; Brazil
200 m freestyle	João de Lucca; Brazil	Federico Grabich; Argentina	Michael Weiss; United States
400 m freestyle	Ryan Cochrane; Canada	Ryan Feeley; United States	Leonardo de Deus; Brazil
1500 m freestyle	Ryan Cochrane; Canada	Andrew Gemmell; United States	Brandonn Almeida; Brazil
100 m backstroke	Nick Thoman; United States	Guilherme Guido; Brazil	Eugene Godsoe; United States
200 m backstroke	Sean Lehane; United States	Carter Griffin; United States	Leonardo de Deus; Brazil
100 m breaststroke	Felipe França; Brazil	Felipe Lima; Brazil	Richard Funk; Canada
200 m breaststroke	Thiago Simon; Brazil	Richard Funk; Canada	Thiago Pereira; Brazil
100 m butterfly	Giles Smith; United States	Santiago Grassi; Argentina	Santo Condorelli; Canada
200 m butterfly	Leonardo de Deus; Brazil	Zack Chetrat; Canada	Alec Page; Canada
200 m individual medley	Henrique Rodrigues; Brazil	Thiago Pereira; Brazil	Joseph Bentz; United States
400 m individual medley	Brandonn Almeida; Brazil	Luke Reilly; Canada	Max Williamson; United States
4×100 m freestyle relay	Brazil; Matheus Santana; João de Lucca; Bruno Fratus; Marcelo Chierighini; Nicolas Oliveira * Thiago Pereira*	Canada; Santo Condorelli; Karl Krug; Evan Van Moerkerke; Yuri Kisil; Markus Thormeyer*; Stefan Milošević*	United States; Josh Schneider; Darian Townsend; Cullen Jones; Michael Weiss; Michael Klueh*; Eugene Godsoe*
4×200 m freestyle relay	Brazil; Luiz Altamir Melo; João de Lucca; Thiago Pereira; Nicolas Oliveira; Henrique Rodrigues*; Kaio de Almeida*; Thiago Simon*	United States; Michael Weiss; Michael Klueh; Joseph Bentz; Darian Townsend; Ryan Feeley*; Bobby Bollier*	Canada; Jeremy Bagshaw; Alec Page; Stefan Milošević; Ryan Cochrane; Yuri Kisil*; Coleman Allen*
4×100 m medley relay	Brazil; Guilherme Guido; Felipe França Silva; Arthur Mendes; Marcelo Chierighini; Thiago Pereira*; Felipe Lima*	United States; Nick Thoman; Brad Craig; Gilles Smith; Josh Schneider; Eugene Godsoe*; Michael Weiss*	Canada; Russell Wood; Richard Funk; Santo Condorelli; Yuri Kisil; James Dergousoff*; Coleman Allen*
10 km marathon	Chip Peterson; United States	David Heron; United States	Esteban Enderica; Ecuador

* Swimmers who participated in the heats only and received medals.

=== Women's events ===
Event	Gold	Silver	Bronze
50m freestyle	Arianna Vanderpool-Wallace; Bahamas	Etiene Medeiros; Brazil	Natalie Coughlin; United States
100m freestyle	Chantal van Landeghem; Canada	Natalie Coughlin; United States	Arianna Vanderpool-Wallace; Bahamas
200m freestyle	Allison Schmitt; United States	Emily Overholt; Canada	Manuella Lyrio; Brazil
400m freestyle	Emily Overholt; Canada	Andreina Pinto; Venezuela	Gillian Ryan; United States
800m freestyle	Sierra Schmidt; United States	Kristel Köbrich; Chile	Andreina Pinto; Venezuela
100m backstroke	Etiene Medeiros; Brazil	Olivia Smoliga; United States	Clara Smiddy; United States
200m backstroke	Hilary Caldwell; Canada	Dominique Bouchard; Canada	Clara Smiddy; United States
100m breaststroke	Katie Meili; United States	Alia Atkinson; Jamaica	Rachel Nicol; Canada
200m breaststroke	Kierra Smith; Canada	Martha McCabe; Canada	Annie Lazor; United States
100m butterfly	Kelsi Worrell; United States	Noemie Thomas; Canada	Katerine Savard; Canada
200m butterfly	Audrey Lacroix; Canada	Katherine Mills; United States	Joanna Maranhão; Brazil
200m I.M.	Caitlin Leverenz; United States	Meghan Small; United States	Sydney Pickrem; Canada
400m I.M.	Caitlin Leverenz; United States	Sydney Pickrem; Canada	Joanna Maranhão; Brazil
4 × 100 m freestyle relay	Canada; Sandrine Mainville; Michele Williams; Katerine Savard; Chantal van Landeghem; Alyson Ackman*; Dominique Bouchard*	United States; Allison Schmitt; Amanda Weir; Madison Kennedy; Natalie Coughlin; Katie Meili*; Kelsi Worrell*	Brazil; Larissa Oliveira; Graciele Herrmann; Etiene Medeiros; Daynara de Paula; Daiane Oliveira*; Manuella Lyrio*
4 × 200 m freestyle relay	United States; Kiera Janzen; Allison Schmitt; Courtney Harnish; Gillian Ryan; Amanda Weir*; Kylie Stewart*	Brazil; Manuella Lyrio; Jéssica Cavalheiro; Joanna Maranhão; Larissa Oliveira; Bruna Primati*; Gabrielle Roncatto*	Canada; Emily Overholt; Katerine Savard; Alyson Ackman; Brittany MacLean; Erika Seltenreich-Hodgson*; Tabitha Baumann*
4 × 100 m medley relay	United States; Natalie Coughlin; Katie Meili; Kelsi Worrell; Allison Schmitt	Canada; Dominique Bouchard; Rachel Nicol; Noemie Thomas; Chantal van Landeghem; Tera van Beilen*; Sandrine Mainville*	Brazil; Etiene Medeiros; Jhennifer Conceição; Daynara de Paula; Larissa Oliveira; Natalia de Luccas*; Beatriz Travalon*
10 km marathon	Eva Fabian; United States	Paola Pérez Sierra; Venezuela	Samantha Arévalo; Ecuador

* Swimmers who swam in preliminary heats and received medals.

== Synchronized swimming ==
Event	Gold	Silver	Bronze
Duet	Canada; Jacqueline Simoneau; Karine Thomas	Mexico; Karem Achach; Nuria Diosdado	United States; Mariya Koroleva; Alison Williams
Team	Canada; Gabriella Brisson; Annabelle Frappier; Claudia Holzner; Lisa Mikelberg; Marie-Lou Morin; Samantha Nealon; Jacqueline Simoneau; Karine Thomas	Mexico; Karem Achach; Karla Arreola; Isabel Delgado; Nuria Diosdado; Evelyn Guajardo; Joana Jiménez; Samantha Rodríguez; Jessica Sobrino	United States; Anita Alvarez; Claire Barton; Mary Killman; Mariya Koroleva; Sandra Ortellado; Sarah Rodríguez; Karensa Tjoa; Alison Williams

== Table tennis ==
Event	Gold	Silver	Bronze
Men's singles	Hugo Calderano; Brazil	Gustavo Tsuboi; Brazil	Thiago Monteiro; Brazil
Men's singles	Hugo Calderano; Brazil	Gustavo Tsuboi; Brazil	Eugene Wang; Canada
Men's team	Brazil; Hugo Calderano; Thiago Monteiro; Gustavo Tsuboi	Paraguay; Alejandro Toranzos; Marcelo Aguirre; Axel Gavilan	Canada; Marko Medjugorak; Pierre-Luc Thériault; Eugene Wang
Men's team	Brazil; Hugo Calderano; Thiago Monteiro; Gustavo Tsuboi	Paraguay; Alejandro Toranzos; Marcelo Aguirre; Axel Gavilan	Puerto Rico; Brian Afanador; Hector Berrios; Daniel Gonzalez
Women's singles	Jennifer Wu; United States	Lin Gui; Brazil	Caroline Kumahara; Brazil
Women's singles	Jennifer Wu; United States	Lin Gui; Brazil	Lily Zhang; United States
Women's team	United States; Lily Zhang; Jennifer Wu; Jiaqui Zheng	Brazil; Caroline Kumahara; Lígia Silva; Lin Gui	Canada; Alicia Cote; Anqi Luo; Zhang Mo
Women's team	United States; Lily Zhang; Jennifer Wu; Jiaqui Zheng	Brazil; Caroline Kumahara; Lígia Silva; Lin Gui	Puerto Rico; Carelyn Cordero; Adriana Diaz; Melanie Diaz

== Taekwondo ==
=== Men's events ===
Event	Gold	Silver	Bronze
Flyweight (58 kg)	Carlos Navarro; Mexico	Luisito Pie; Dominican Republic	Lucas Guzman; Argentina
Flyweight (58 kg)	Carlos Navarro; Mexico	Luisito Pie; Dominican Republic	Harold Avella; Colombia
Lightweight (68 kg)	Saul Gutierrez; Mexico	Maxime Potvin; Canada	Miguel Trejos; Colombia
Lightweight (68 kg)	Saul Gutierrez; Mexico	Maxime Potvin; Canada	Luis Colon III; Puerto Rico
Middleweight (80 kg)	Jose Cobas; Cuba	Moisés Hernández; Dominican Republic	Steven Lopez; United States
Middleweight (80 kg)	Jose Cobas; Cuba	Moisés Hernández; Dominican Republic	Rene Lizarraga; Mexico
Heavyweight (+80 kg)	Rafael Alba; Cuba	Carlos Rivas; Venezuela	Marc-Andre Bergeron; Canada
Heavyweight (+80 kg)	Rafael Alba; Cuba	Carlos Rivas; Venezuela	Philip Yun; United States

=== Women's events ===
Event	Gold	Silver	Bronze
Flyweight (49 kg)	Yania Aguirre; Cuba	Itzel Manjarrez; Mexico	Iris Tang Sing; Brazil
Flyweight (49 kg)	Yania Aguirre; Cuba	Itzel Manjarrez; Mexico	Candelaria Martes; Dominican Republic
Lightweight (57 kg)	Cheyenne Lewis; United States	Paulina Armeria; Mexico	Doris Patiño; Colombia
Lightweight (57 kg)	Cheyenne Lewis; United States	Paulina Armeria; Mexico	Yamicel Nunez; Cuba
Middleweight (67 kg)	Paige McPherson; United States	Victoria Heredia; Mexico	Daima Villalon; Cuba
Middleweight (67 kg)	Paige McPherson; United States	Victoria Heredia; Mexico	Alexis Arnoldt; Argentina
Heavyweight (+67 kg)	Jackie Galloway; United States	María del Rosario Espinoza; Mexico	Jessica Bravo; Colombia
Heavyweight (+67 kg)	Jackie Galloway; United States	María del Rosario Espinoza; Mexico	Raphaella Galacho; Brazil

== Tennis ==
Event	Gold	Silver	Bronze
Men's singles	Facundo Bagnis; Argentina	Nicolás Barrientos; Colombia	Dennis Novikov; United States
Men's doubles	Chile; Nicolás Jarry; Hans Podlipnik	Argentina; Guido Andreozzi; Facundo Bagnis	Ecuador; Gonzalo Escobar; Emilio Gómez
Women's singles	Mariana Duque Mariño; Colombia	Victoria Rodríguez; Mexico	Monica Puig; Puerto Rico
Women's doubles	Canada; Gabriela Dabrowski; Carol Zhao	Mexico; Victoria Rodríguez; Marcela Zacarías	Argentina; María Irigoyen; Paula Ormaechea
Mixed doubles	Argentina; Guido Andreozzi; María Irigoyen	Canada; Philip Bester; Gabriela Dabrowski	Paraguay; Verónica Cepede Royg; Diego Galeano

== Triathlon ==
Event	Gold	Silver	Bronze
Men's individual	Crisanto Grajales; Mexico	Kevin McDowell; United States	Irving Perez; Mexico
Women's individual	Bárbara Riveros; Chile	Paola Diaz; Mexico	Flora Duffy; Bermuda

== Volleyball ==
Event	Gold	Silver	Bronze
Men's tournament	Argentina; Sebastian Closter; Facundo Conte; Pablo Crer; Luciano de Cecco; Javier Filardi; Maximiliano Gauna; Jose Gonzalez; Rodrigo Quiroga; Martin Ramos; Sebastian Sole; Nicolas Uriarte; Luciano Zornetta	Brazil; Carlos Eduardo Silva; Douglas Souza; Flávio Gualberto; João Rafael Ferreira; Maurício Borges Silva; Maurício Souza; Murilo Radke; Otávio Pinto; Rafael Araújo; Renan Buiatti; Thiago Veloso; Tiago Brendle	Canada; Nicholas Hoag; Dan Lewis; Steven Marshall; John Gordon Perrin; TJ Sanders; Gavin Schmitt; Dustin Schneider; Adam Simac; Toontje van Lankvelt; Rudy Verhoeff; Graham Vigrass; Fred Winters
Women's tournament	United States; Lauren Paolini; Cassidy Lichtman; Kristin Hildebrand; Natalie Hagglund; Nicole Fawcett; Cursty Jackson; Michelle Bartsch; Falyn Fonoimoana; Jenna Hagglund; Rachael Adams; Carli Lloyd; Krista Vansant	Brazil; Adenízia da Silva; Ana Tiemi; Angélica Malinverno; Bárbara Brunch; Camila Brait; Fernanda Garay; Jaqueline Carvalho; Joyce da Silva; Macris Carneiro; Mariana Costa; Michelle Pavão; Rosamaria Montibeller	Dominican Republic; Annerys Vargas; Marianne Fersola; Brenda Castillo; Camil Domínguez; Niverka Marte; Prisilla Rivera; Yonkaira Peña; Gina Mambru; Bethania de la Cruz; Ana Binet; Brayelin Martínez; Jineiry Martínez

== Water polo ==
Event	Gold	Silver	Bronze
Men's tournament	United States; Merrill Moses; Alex Obert; Luca Cupido; Josh Samuels; Tony Azevedo; Alex Bowen; Bret Bonanni; Nikola Vavic; Jackson Kimbell; Alex Roelse; Jesse Smith; John Mann; McQuin Baron	Brazil; Adrià Delgado; Bernardo Gomes; Bernardo Rocha; Felipe Perrone; Felipe Costa e Silva; Guilherme Gomes; Gustavo Guimarães; Ives Alonso; Jonas Crivella; Josip Vrlić; Paulo Salemi; Thyê Bezerra; Vinicius Antonelli	Canada; Constantine Kudaba; Nicolas Bicari; Justin Boyd; Kevin Graham; Josh Conway; Jared McElroy; Dusan Aleksic; Robin Randall; Oliver Vikalo; Scott Robinson; Alec Taschereau; Dusan Radojcic; George Torakis
Women's tournament	United States; Samantha Hill; Madeline Musselman; Melissa Seidemann; Rachel Fattal; Caroline Clark; Margaret Steffens; Courtney Mathewson; Kiley Neushul; Ashley Grossman; Kaleigh Gilchrist; Makenzie Fischer; Kameryn Craig; Ashleigh Johnson	Canada; Jessica Gaudreault; Krystina Alogbo; Katie Monton; Emma Wright; Monika Eggens; Jakie Kohli; Joelle Bekhazi; Shae Fournier; Carmen Eggens; Christine Robinson; Stephanie Valin; Dominique Perreault; Claire Wright	Brazil; Tess Oliveira; Marina Zablith; Izabella Chiappini; Catherine Oliveira; Luiza Carvalho; Mirella Coutinho; Gabriela Dias; Diana Abla; Marina Canetti; Lucianne Maia; Melani Dias; Viviane Bahia; Victoria Chamorro

== Water skiing ==
=== Men's events ===
Event	Gold	Silver	Bronze
Jump	Ryan Dodd; Canada	Rodrigo Miranda; Chile	Felipe Miranda; Chile
Slalom	Nate Smith; United States	Jason McClintock; Canada	Javier Julio; Argentina
Tricks	Adam Pickos; United States	Jaret Llewellyn; Canada	Javier Julio; Argentina
Overall	Felipe Miranda; Chile	Jaret Llewellyn; Canada	Javier Julio; Argentina
Wakeboard	Rusty Malinoski; Canada	Daniel Powers; United States	Juan Mendez; Venezuela

=== Women's events ===
Event	Gold	Silver	Bronze
Jump	Regina Jaquess; United States	Whitney McClintock; Canada	Fernanda Naser; Chile
Slalom	Whitney McClintock; Canada	Regina Jaquess; United States	Erika Lang; United States
Tricks	Natalia Cuglievan; Peru	Whitney McClintock; Canada	Erika Lang; United States
Overall	Whitney McClintock; Canada	Regina Jaquess; United States	Carolina Chapoy; Mexico

== Weightlifting ==
=== Men's events ===
Event	Gold	Silver	Bronze
56 kg	Habib de las Salas; Colombia	Carlos Berna; Colombia	Luis García; Dominican Republic
62 kg	Óscar Figueroa; Colombia	Francisco Mosquera; Colombia	Jesús López; Venezuela
69 kg	Luis Javier Mosquera; Colombia	Bredni Roque; Mexico	Francis Luna-Grenier; Canada
77 kg	Addriel La O Cuba	Junior Sánchez; Venezuela	Jhor Moreno; Colombia
85 kg	Yoelmis Hernández; Cuba	Yadier Nuñez; Cuba	Juan Francisco Ruiz; Colombia
94 kg	Kendrick Farris; United States	Norik Vardanian; United States	Javier Vanega; Cuba
105 kg	Jesús González; Venezuela	Mateus Gregorio Machado; Brazil	Jorge Arroyo; Ecuador
+105 kg	Fernando Reis; Brazil	George Kobaladze; Canada	Fernando Salas Manguis; Ecuador

=== Women's events ===
Event	Gold	Silver	Bronze
48 kg	Cándida Vásquez; Dominican Republic	Ana Segura; Colombia	Beatriz Pirón; Dominican Republic
53 kg	Rusmeris Villar; Colombia	Génesis Rodríguez; Venezuela	Yafreisy Silvestre; Dominican Republic
58 kg	Lina Rivas; Colombia	Yusleidy Figueroa; Venezuela	Quisia Guicho; Mexico
63 kg	Mercedes Pérez; Colombia	Marina Rodríguez; Cuba	Bruna Nascimento Piloto; Brazil
69 kg	Leydi Solís; Colombia	Neisi Dájomes; Ecuador	Aremi Fuentes; Mexico
75 kg	Ubaldina Valoyes; Colombia	Fernanda Valdés; Chile	Jaqueline Antonia Ferreira; Brazil
+75 kg	Yaniuska Espinosa; Venezuela	Naryury Perez; Venezuela	Seledina Nieve; Ecuador

== Wrestling ==
=== Men's events ===
Freestyle

Event	Gold	Silver	Bronze
57 kg	Yowlys Bonne; Cuba	Angel Escobedo; United States	Emir Hernandez; Colombia
57 kg	Yowlys Bonne; Cuba	Angel Escobedo; United States	Pedro Mejias; Venezuela
65 kg	Brent Metcalf; United States	Franklin Marén; Cuba	Haislan Garcia; Canada
65 kg	Brent Metcalf; United States	Franklin Marén; Cuba	Franklin Gómez; Puerto Rico
74 kg	Jordan Burroughs; United States	Yoan Blanco; Ecuador	Christian Sarco; Venezuela
74 kg	Jordan Burroughs; United States	Yoan Blanco; Ecuador	Liván López; Cuba
86 kg	Reineris Salas; Cuba	Jake Herbert; United States	Tamerlan Tagziev; Canada
86 kg	Reineris Salas; Cuba	Jake Herbert; United States	Jaime Espinal; Puerto Rico
97 kg	Kyle Snyder; United States	Arjun Gill; Canada	Jose Diaz; Venezuela
97 kg	Kyle Snyder; United States	Arjun Gill; Canada	Jesse Ruiz; Mexico
125 kg	Zach Rey; United States	Korey Jarvis; Canada	Edgardo Lopez; Puerto Rico
125 kg	Zach Rey; United States	Korey Jarvis; Canada	Andres Ramos; Cuba

Greco-Roman

Event	Gold	Silver	Bronze
59 kg	Andres Montaño; Ecuador	Ali Soto; Mexico	Cristóbal Torres; Chile
59 kg	Andres Montaño; Ecuador	Ali Soto; Mexico	Spenser Mango; United States
66 kg	Wuileixis Rivas; Venezuela	Bryce Saddoris; United States	Miguel Martinez; Cuba
66 kg	Wuileixis Rivas; Venezuela	Bryce Saddoris; United States	Mario Molina; Peru
75 kg	Andy Bisek; United States	Alvis Almendra; Panama	Juan Escobar; Mexico
75 kg	Andy Bisek; United States	Alvis Almendra; Panama	Carlos Muñoz; Colombia
85 kg	Jon Anderson; United States	Querys Perez; Venezuela	Alan Vera; Cuba
85 kg	Jon Anderson; United States	Querys Perez; Venezuela	Cristhian Mosquera; Colombia
98 kg	Yasmany Lugo; Cuba	Kevin Mejía; Honduras	Luillys Pérez; Venezuela
98 kg	Yasmany Lugo; Cuba	Kevin Mejía; Honduras	Davi Albino; Brazil
130 kg	Mijaín López; Cuba	Andrés Ayub; Chile	Josue Encarnación; Dominican Republic
130 kg	Mijaín López; Cuba	Andrés Ayub; Chile	Robby Smith; United States

=== Women's events ===
Freestyle

Event	Gold	Silver	Bronze
48 kg	Genevieve Morrison; Canada	Thalia Mallqui; Peru	Alyssa Lampe; United States
48 kg	Genevieve Morrison; Canada	Thalia Mallqui; Peru	Carolina Castillo; Colombia
53 kg	Whitney Conder; United States	Alma Valencia; Mexico	Yamilka Del Valle; Cuba
53 kg	Whitney Conder; United States	Alma Valencia; Mexico	Betzabeth Argüello; Venezuela
58 kg	Joice Souza; Brazil	Yakelin Estornell; Cuba	Lissette Antes; Ecuador
58 kg	Joice Souza; Brazil	Yakelin Estornell; Cuba	Yanet Sovero; Peru
63 kg	Braxton Stone; Canada	Katerina Vidiaux; Cuba	Jackeline Rentería; Colombia
63 kg	Braxton Stone; Canada	Katerina Vidiaux; Cuba	Erin Clodgo; United States
69 kg	Dorothy Yeats; Canada	Maria Acosta; Venezuela	Diana Miranda; Mexico
69 kg	Dorothy Yeats; Canada	Maria Acosta; Venezuela	Luz Vazquez; Argentina
75 kg	Adeline Gray; United States	Justina Di Stasio; Canada	Aline Ferreira; Brazil
75 kg	Adeline Gray; United States	Justina Di Stasio; Canada	Lisset Hechavarria; Cuba
