= Rugby sevens at the 2015 Pan American Games – Women's team rosters =

This article shows the rosters of all participating teams at the women's rugby sevens tournament at the 2015 Pan American Games in Toronto. Rosters can have a maximum of 12 athletes.

== Argentina ==
The Argentine women's rugby sevens team:

- Maria Botelli
- Yamila Otero
- Luciana Travesi
- Mayra Genghinil
- Josefina Padellaro
- Gladys Alcaraz
- Valeria Montero
- Rita Cazorla
- Patricia Fusco
- Sofia Gonzalez
- Magali Fazzi
- Sabrina Marcos

== Brazil ==
Brazil announced their squad on July 1, 2015.

- Juliana Esteves dos Santos
- Bruna Lotufo
- Beatriz Futuro Muhlbauer
- Edna Santini
- Paula Ishibashi
- Isadora Cerullo
- Claudia Lopes Teles
- Haline Leme Scatrut
- Angelica Pereira Gevaerd
- Maira Bravo Behrendt
- Raquel Kochhann
- Mariana Barbosa Ramalho

== Canada ==
Canada announced their squad on June 9, 2015.

- Britt Benn
- Hannah Darling
- Magali Harvey
- Sara Kaljuvee
- Jen Kish
- Ghislaine Landry
- Kayla Moleschi
- Karen Paquin
- Nadia Popov
- Kelly Russell
- Ashley Steacy
- Natasha Watcham-Roy

== Colombia ==
The Colombian squad.

- Isabel Romero
- Guadalupe López
- Solangie Delgado
- Estefanía Ramírez
- Laura González
- Maria Monroy
- Laura Ortiz
- Alejandra Betancur
- Ana Ramírez
- Nicole Acevedo
- Camila Lopera
- Luz Zapata

== Mexico ==
The Mexico women's rugby sevens team:

- Michelle Farah
- Maria Carrillo
- Bertha Landeros
- Alejandra Rosales
- Andrea Rodriguez
- Wendy Garcia
- Georgina Zenteno
- Dorian Avelar
- Bertha Fernandez
- Alma Rivera
- Paulina Islas
- Rosa Rivera

== United States ==
The United States women's rugby sevens team:

- Megan Bonny
- Kelly Griffin
- Joanne Fa'avesi
- Leyla Kelter
- Richelle Stephens
- Lauren Doyle
- Kristen Thomas
- Hannah Lopez
- Melissa Fowler
- Irene Gardner
- Kate Zackary
- Kathryn Johnson
