= Rugby sevens at the 2015 Pan American Games =

- Rugby sevens pictogram for the games
- Venues: Exhibition Stadium
- Dates: July 11–12
- No. of events: 2 (1 men, 1 women)
- Competitors: 168 from 9 nations

Rugby sevens at the 2015 Pan American Games was held in Toronto, Ontario, Canada from July 11 to 12. The rugby sevens competition was held at BMO Field, although due to naming rights, the venue was known as Exhibition Stadium for the duration of the games. This was the second time that the men's competition will be held, following rugby sevens' debut at the 2011 Games, with women's rugby sevens making its debut. A total of eight men's and six women's teams competed in each respective tournament.

== Competition schedule ==
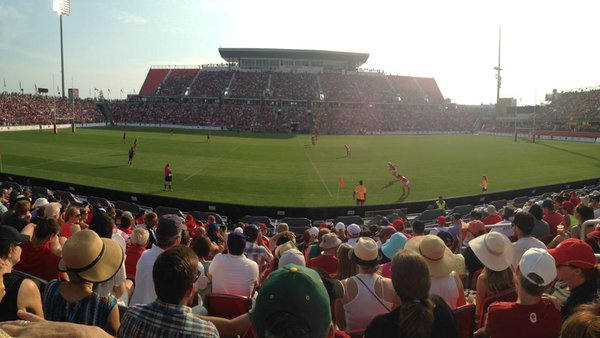
BMO Field (Exhibition Stadium) in Toronto was the venue for the rugby sevens competitions

The following is the competition schedule for the rugby sevens competitions:

P	Preliminaries	¼	Quarterfinals	½	Semifinals	B	3rd place play-off	F	Final

Event↓/Date →	Sat 11	Sun 12			
Men	P	¼	½	B	F
Women	P	P		B	F

== Medal table ==
* Host nation (Canada)

Rank	Nation	Gold	Silver	Bronze	Total
1	Canada*	2	0	0	2
2	United States	0	1	1	2
3	Argentina	0	1	0	1
4	Brazil	0	0	1	1
Totals (4 entries)		2	2	2	6

== Medalists ==
Event	Gold	Silver	Bronze
Men's tournament	Canada; Sean White; Admir Cejvanovic; Mike Fuailefau; John Moonlight; Conor Trainor; Sean Duke; Phil Mack; Justin Douglas; Nathan Hirayama; Lucas Hammond; Harry Jones; Matthew Mullins	Argentina; Fernando Luna; Santiago Alvarez; German Schulz; Nicolas Bruzzone; Emiliano Boffelli; Gastón Revol; Bautista Ezcurra; Rodrigo Etchart; Franco Sabato; Juan Tuculet; Ramiro Finco; Axel Muller Aranda	United States; Carlin Isles; Patrick Blair; Brett Thompson; Garrett Bender; Mike Te'o; Stephen Tomasin; Will Holder; Ben Leatigaga; Nate Augspurger; Madison Hughes; Perry Baker; Martin Iosefo
Women's tournament	Canada; Brittany Benn; Kayla Moleschi; Karen Paquin; Kelly Russell; Ashley Steacy; Sara Kaljuvee; Jen Kish; Nadejda Popov; Ghislaine Landry; Hannah Darling; Magali Harvey; Natasha Watcham-Roy	United States; Megan Bonny; Kelly Griffin; Joanne Fa'avesi; Leyla Kelter; Richelle Stephens; Lauren Doyle; Kristen Thomas; Hannah Lopez; Melissa Fowler; Irene Gardner; Kate Zackary; Kathryn Johnson	Brazil; Juliana Esteves dos Santos; Bruna Lotufo; Beatriz Futuro Muhlbauer; Edna Santini; Paula Ishibashi; Isadora Cerullo; Claudia Lopes Teles; Haline Leme Scatrut; Angelica Pereira Gevaerd; Maira Bravo Behrendt; Raquel Kochhann; Mariana Barbosa Ramalho

== Qualification ==
A total of eight men's teams and six women's team have qualified to compete at the games. Each nation may enter one team in each tournament (12 athletes per team) for a maximum total of 24 athletes.

=== Men ===
Event	Date	Location	Vacancies	Qualified
Host Nation	—N/a	—N/a	1	Canada
Qualified automatically	—N/a	—N/a	2	Argentina; United States
2014 South American Games	March 8–9	(Chile) Santiago	1	Uruguay
2014 NACRA Sevens	December 3–4	Mexico City	2	Guyana; Mexico
2015 Mar del Plata Sevens	January 10–11	(Argentina) Mar del Plata	2	Brazil; Chile
Total			8	

=== Women ===
Event	Date	Location	Vacancies	Qualified
Host Nation	—N/a	—N/a	1	Canada
Qualified automatically	—N/a	—N/a	1	United States
2014 South American Games	March 8–9	(Chile) Santiago	1	Brazil
2014 NACRA Women's Sevens	December 3–4	Mexico City	1	Mexico
2015 Mar del Plata Sevens	January 10–11	(Argentina) Mar del Plata	2	Argentina; Colombia
Total			6	

== Participating nations ==
A total of nine countries have qualified rugby sevens teams. The numbers in parentheses represents the number of participants qualified.

- Argentina (24)
- Brazil (24)
- Canada (24)
- Chile (12)
- Colombia (12)
- Guyana (12)
- Mexico (24)
- United States (24)
- Uruguay (12)

== See also ==
- Rugby sevens at the 2016 Summer Olympics
