= 2014 NACRA Sevens =

Rugby competition

- Hosts: Mexico
- Date: 3–4 December

Final positions
- Champions: Guyana
- Runners-up: Mexico
- Third: Trinidad and Tobago

The 2014 NACRA sevens is an annual rugby sevens competition held for teams affiliated with the North America Caribbean Rugby Association. The competition was held between December 3 and 4 at the Campo Marte in Mexico City, Mexico. A total of twelve teams (including two from host nation Mexico) competed in the men's tournament.

In the men's gold medal match, Guyana managed to come back from being down 7–21 at half time to defeat Mexico. The top two teams in the men's competition, along with the winner of the women's competition qualified to compete at the 2015 Pan American Games in Toronto, Canada.

== Pool stage ==
Men's schedule and results:

Qualified for the medal round

=== Pool A ===
Team	Pld	W	D	L	Points
Trinidad and Tobago	3	2	1	0	7
Jamaica	3	2	1	0	7
Mexico B	3	1	0	2	3
Curaçao	3	0	0	3	0

December 3, 2014

Trinidad and Tobago	48 – 0	Curaçao

December 3, 2014

Jamaica	22 – 7	Mexico B

December 3, 2014

Jamaica	31 – 0	Curaçao

December 3, 2014

Trinidad and Tobago	36 – 14	Mexico B

December 3, 2014

Curaçao	0 – 56	Mexico B

December 3, 2014

Trinidad and Tobago	28 – 28	Jamaica

=== Pool B ===
Team	Pld	W	D	L	Points
Barbados	3	3	0	0	9
Bermuda	3	2	0	1	6
British Virgin Islands	3	1	0	2	3
Saint Lucia	3	0	0	3	0

December 3, 2014

Barbados	69 – 0	British Virgin Islands

December 3, 2014

Bermuda	47 – 0	Saint Lucia

December 3, 2014

Barbados	42 – 7	Saint Lucia

December 3, 2014

Bermuda	45 – 0	British Virgin Islands

December 3, 2014

British Virgin Islands	35 – 14	Saint Lucia

December 3, 2014

Barbados	33 – 10	Bermuda

=== Pool C ===
Team	Pld	W	D	L	Points
Guyana	3	3	0	0	9
Mexico	3	2	0	1	6
Cayman Islands	3	1	0	2	3
St Vincent & Grenadines	3	0	0	3	0

December 3, 2014

Mexico	7 – 19	Guyana

December 3, 2014

Cayman Islands	56 – 14	St Vincent & Grenadines

December 3, 2014

Mexico	68 – 0	St Vincent & Grenadines

December 3, 2014

Cayman Islands	12 – 38	Guyana

December 3, 2014

Guyana	47 – 0	St Vincent & Grenadines

December 3, 2014

Mexico	35 – 0	Cayman Islands

== Bowl Group ==
Team	Pld	W	D	L	Points
Mexico B	3	3	0	0	9
St Vincent & Grenadines	3	1	0	2	3
Saint Lucia	3	1	0	2	3
Curaçao	3	1	0	2	3

December 4, 2014

Mexico B	42 – 5	Curaçao

December 4, 2014

Saint Lucia	24 – 21	St Vincent & Grenadines

December 4, 2014

Mexico B	26 – 14	St Vincent & Grenadines

December 4, 2014

Saint Lucia	10 – 14	Curaçao

December 4, 2014

Curaçao	10 – 14	St Vincent & Grenadines

December 4, 2014

Mexico B	31 – 7	Saint Lucia

== Elimination stage ==
Quarter-finals
December 4 — Mexico City
Guyana	31
Cayman Islands	5
December 4 — Mexico City
Trinidad and Tobago	17
Bermuda	12
December 4 — Mexico City
Barbados	38
British Virgin Islands	0
December 4 — Mexico City
Jamaica	12
Mexico	17

Semi-finals
December 4 — Mexico City
Guyana	24
Trinidad and Tobago	7
December 4 — Mexico City
Barbados	7
Mexico	24

Final
December 4 — Mexico City
Guyana	33
Mexico	28
Third place
December 4 —Mexico City
Trinidad and Tobago	14
Barbados	17

=== Quarterfinals ===
December 4, 2014

Guyana	31 – 5	Cayman Islands

December 4, 2014

Trinidad and Tobago	17 – 12	Bermuda

December 4, 2014

Barbados	38 – 0	British Virgin Islands

December 4, 2014

Jamaica	12 – 17	Mexico

=== Plate ===
December 4, 2014

British Virgin Islands	14 – 43	Jamaica

December 4, 2014

Bermuda	12 – 19	Cayman Islands

=== Seventh place match ===
December 4, 2014

Bermuda	33 – 0	British Virgin Islands

=== Fifth place match ===
December 4, 2014

Cayman Islands	22 – 11	Jamaica

=== Semifinals ===
December 4, 2014

Guyana	24 – 7	Trinidad and Tobago

December 4, 2014

Barbados	7 – 24	Mexico

=== Bronze medal match ===
December 4, 2014

Trinidad and Tobago	14 – 17	Barbados

=== Gold medal match ===
December 4, 2014

Guyana	33 – 28	Mexico

== Final standings ==
Qualified for the 2015 Pan American Games

Rank	Team
Gold medal	Guyana
Silver medal	Mexico
Bronze medal	Barbados
4	Trinidad and Tobago
5	Cayman Islands
6	Jamaica
7	Bermuda
8	British Virgin Islands
9	Mexico–B
10	St Vincent & Grenadines
11	Saint Lucia
12	Curaçao

== See also ==
- 2014 NACRA Women's Sevens
