= Garrett Bender =

American rugby union player

- Born: December 2, 1991 (age 34) Minneapolis, MN, U.S.
- Height: 6 ft 4 in (1.93 m)
- Weight: 225 lb (102 kg)

Rugby union career
- Position: Forward
Senior career
Years	Team	Apps	(Points)
2017	Seattle Seawolves	0	(0)
National sevens team
Years	Team		Comps
2011–2016	United States 7s		114
- Correct as of December 1, 2017

Garrett Bender (born December 2, 1991) is an American rugby union player who plays for the United States national rugby sevens team.

Bender was born and grew up in Minneapolis, Minnesota. He attended Minneapolis Washburn High School where he played several sports; in American football he was team captain, All-Conference, All-Metro, and ranked third in state in tackles; he also captained his high school rugby team to the Minnesota High School State Championship. Bender joined the Youngbloodz rugby team, where he was coached by Sam Robinson, who played an important part in Bender's rugby development.

Bender was recruited and offered a scholarship in 2010 to play American football as a linebacker for the NCAA Division II St. Cloud State Huskies. Bender, however, decided to focus on playing rugby.

Bender signed a contract in early 2012 to play rugby for the U.S. national team. Bender was part of the U.S. squad at the 2015 Pan American Games that qualified to play in the 2016 Olympics.

He joined the Seattle Seawolves team for the inaugural season of Major League Rugby in 2018.

== Personal ==
Bender is the son of Michael Bender and Sue Marcks-Bender. He has one brother, Brant.
