= Nicolás Bruzzone =

- Born: October 24, 1985 (age 41) Santa Fe, Argentina
- Height: 1.68 m (5 ft 6 in)
- Weight: 76 kg (168 lb)

Rugby union career
- Position: Scrum-half
- Current team: Universitario de Santa Fe (Argentina)
Senior career
Years	Team	Apps	(Points)
2010-2011	Pampas XV		
International career
Years	Team	Apps	(Points)
2007-	Argentina		
2010	Argentina XV		
2005-2006	Argentina U-21		
National sevens team
Years	Team		Comps
2005-	Argentina 7s		

Nicolás Bruzzone (born October 24, 1985) is an Argentine rugby sevens former player. His original club is Universitario de Santa Fe. He competed for Argentina 7s at the 2016 Summer Olympics. He initially missed out on Olympic selection but was a late addition to the Argentine squad after injury woes to Javier Rojas and Rodrigo Etchart.

Bruzzone set a national record as the most capped sevens player.
