= Lucas Hammond =

Canadian rugby player

Personal information
- Born: November 14, 1993 (age 32) Cape Town, South Africa
- Height: 183 cm (6 ft 0 in)
- Weight: 90 kg (198 lb)
Medal record
Men's Rugby sevens
Representing Canada
Pan American Games
| Gold medal – first place | 2015 Toronto | Team |

Lucas Hammond (born November 14, 1993) is a Canadian rugby union player, in the sevens discipline. Hammond's parents are both Canadians who lived in South Africa, where Hammond was born. They decided to emigrate back to Canada to be closer to family.

== Career ==
Hammond was part of Canada's 2014 Commonwealth Games and 2018 Commonwealth Games, with both teams getting knocked out in the group stage.

Hammond won gold as part of Canada's team at the 2015 Pan American Games in Toronto.

In June 2021, Hammond was named to Canada's 2020 Olympic team.
