= Rugby sevens at the 2015 Pan American Games – Women's tournament =

Rugby sevens at the 2015 Pan American Games
- Venues: Exhibition Stadium
- Dates: July 11–12, 2015
- Competitors: 72 from 6 nations

Medalists
Gold medal	Canada
Silver medal	United States
Bronze medal	Brazil

The women's tournament of rugby sevens at the 2015 Pan American Games was held in Toronto, Ontario, Canada from July 11 to 12. The rugby sevens competition was held at BMO Field, although due to naming rights, the venue was known as Exhibition Stadium for the duration of the games. Women's rugby sevens was making its debut in the Pan American Games. A total of six teams competed in the tournament.

== Qualification ==
A total of six women's teams qualified to compete at the games (12 athletes per team).

Event	Date	Location	Vacancies	Qualified
Host Nation	—N/a	—N/a	1	Canada
Qualified automatically	—N/a	—N/a	1	United States
2014 South American Games	March 8–9	(Chile) Santiago	1	Brazil
2014 NACRA Women's Sevens	December 3–4	Mexico City	1	Mexico
2015 Mar del Plata Sevens	January 10–11	(Argentina) Mar del Plata	2	Argentina; Colombia
Total			6	

== Medallists ==
Event	Gold	Silver	Bronze
Women's tournament	Canada; Brittany Benn; Kayla Moleschi; Karen Paquin; Kelly Russell; Ashley Steacy; Sara Kaljuvee; Jen Kish; Nadejda Popov; Ghislaine Landry; Hannah Darling; Magali Harvey; Natasha Watcham-Roy	United States; Megan Bonny; Kelly Griffin; Joanne Fa'avesi; Leyla Kelter; Richelle Stephens; Lauren Doyle; Kristen Thomas; Hannah Lopez; Melissa Fowler; Irene Gardner; Kate Zackary; Kathryn Johnson	Brazil; Juliana Esteves dos Santos; Bruna Lotufo; Beatriz Futuro Muhlbauer; Edna Santini; Paula Ishibashi; Isadora Cerullo; Claudia Lopes Teles; Haline Leme Scatrut; Angelica Pereira Gevaerd; Maira Bravo Behrendt; Raquel Kochhann; Mariana Barbosa Ramalho

== Tournament ==
=== Preliminary stage ===
==== Pool Play ====
Team	Pld	W	D	L	PF	PA	PD	Pts	Qualification
Canada	5	5	0	0	230	12	+218	15	Qualified for gold-medal match
United States	5	4	0	1	203	48	+155	13	Qualified for gold-medal match
Brazil	5	3	0	2	115	67	+48	11	Qualified for bronze-medal match
Argentina	5	1	1	3	57	131	−74	8	Qualified for bronze-medal match
Colombia	5	1	1	3	29	148	−119	8	
Mexico	5	0	0	5	24	252	−228	5	

11 July 2015
10:05

Canada	55–0	Colombia
	Report

Exhibition Stadium, Toronto

11 July 2015
10:27

United States	26–7	Brazil
	Report

Exhibition Stadium, Toronto

11 July 2015
10:49

Mexico	5–40	Argentina
	Report

Exhibition Stadium, Toronto

11 July 2015
12:49

United States	40–0	Colombia
	Report

Exhibition Stadium, Toronto

11 July 2015
13:11

Brazil	22–5	Argentina
	Report

Exhibition Stadium, Toronto

11 July 2015
13:33

Canada	60–0	Mexico
	Report

Exhibition Stadium, Toronto

11 July 2015
17:33

Argentina	7–54	United States
	Report

Exhibition Stadium, Toronto

11 July 2015
17:55

Canada	36–0	Brazil
	Report

Exhibition Stadium, Toronto

11 July 2015
18:17

Colombia	24–19	Mexico
	Report

Exhibition Stadium, Toronto

12 July 2015
10:05

Argentina	0–45	Canada
	Report

Exhibition Stadium, Toronto

12 July 2015
10:27

Colombia	0–29	Brazil
	Report

Exhibition Stadium, Toronto

12 July 2015
10:49

Mexico	0–71	United States
	Report

Exhibition Stadium, Toronto

12 July 2015
12:49

Argentina	5–5	Colombia
	Report

Exhibition Stadium, Toronto

12 July 2015
13:11

Brazil	57–0	Mexico
	Report

Exhibition Stadium, Toronto

12 July 2015
13:33

Canada	34–12	United States
	Report

Exhibition Stadium, Toronto

==== Fifth Place Game ====
12 July 2015
17:33

Mexico	17–17	Colombia
	Report

Exhibition Stadium, Toronto

==== Bronze Medal Game ====
12 July 2015
17:55

(bronze) Brazil	29–0	Argentina
	Report

Exhibition Stadium, Toronto

==== Gold Medal Game ====
12 July 2015
18:20

(silver) United States	7–55	Canada (gold)
	Report

Exhibition Stadium, Toronto

2015 Pan American Games champion

Canada
1st title

== Final ranking ==
Rank	Team	Record
1st place, gold medalist(s)	Canada	6–0–0
2nd place, silver medalist(s)	United States	4–0–2
3rd place, bronze medalist(s)	Brazil	4–0–2
4	Argentina	1–1–4
5	Colombia	1–2–3
5	Mexico	0–1–5
