= Angelica Pereira Gevaerd =

- Born: November 12, 1987 (age 39)
- Height: 1.66 m (5 ft 5 in)
- Weight: 64 kg (141 lb; 10 st 1 lb)

Rugby union career
National sevens team
Years	Team	Comps
- Brazil
Medal record
Women's rugby sevens
Representing Brazil
Pan American Games
Bronze medal – third place	2015 Toronto	Team competition

Angelica Pereira Gevaerd (born November 12, 1987) is a Brazilian rugby sevens player. She won a bronze medal at the 2015 Pan American Games as a member of the Brazil women's national rugby sevens team.
