= Kathryn Johnson (rugby union) =

American rugby sevens player

- Born: October 25, 1991 (age 35) Hopkins, Minnesota
- Height: 1.77 m (5 ft 10 in)
- Weight: 69 kg (152 lb)

Rugby union career
- Position: No. 8
International career
Years	Team	Apps	(Points)
	United States	3	(0)
National sevens team
Years	Team		Comps
2013–	United States		
Medal record
Women's rugby sevens
Representing United States
Pan American Games
Silver medal – second place	2015 Toronto	Team competition

Kathryn Johnson (born October 25, 1991) is an American rugby sevens player. She won a silver medal at the 2015 Pan American Games as a member of the United States women's national rugby sevens team. She was selected as a member of the United States women's national rugby sevens team to the 2016 Summer Olympics.

Johnson was named in the Eagles squad for the 2022 Pacific Four Series in New Zealand. She was then selected in the Eagles squad for the 2021 Rugby World Cup in New Zealand.
