= Maira Bravo Behrendt =

Brazilian rugby sevens player

- Born: January 16, 1991 (age 35)
- Height: 1.65 m (5 ft 5 in)
- Weight: 60 kg (130 lb; 9 st 6 lb)

Rugby union career
National sevens team
Years	Team	Comps
- Brazil
Medal record
Women's rugby sevens
Representing Brazil
Pan American Games
Bronze medal – third place	2015 Toronto	Team competition

Maira Bravo Behrendt (born January 16, 1991) is a Brazilian rugby sevens player. She won a bronze medal at the 2015 Pan American Games as a member of the Brazil women's national rugby sevens team.
