= Juliana Esteves dos Santos =

Rugby player (born 1984)

Juliana Santos
- Born: Juliana Esteves dos Santos; January 27, 1984 (age 42)
- Height: 1.77 m (5 ft 10 in)
- Weight: 72 kg (159 lb)

Rugby union career
National sevens team
Years	Team	Comps
2012–present	Brazil	
Medal record
Women's rugby sevens
Representing Brazil
Pan American Games
Bronze medal – third place	2015 Toronto	Team competition

Juliana Esteves dos Santos (born January 27, 1984) is a Brazilian rugby sevens player. She won a bronze medal at the 2015 Pan American Games as a member of the Brazil women's national rugby sevens team. She is a member of Brazil's women's sevens squad to the 2016 Summer Olympics.
