= Kristen Thomas =

American rugby union player

Personal information
- Born: July 1, 1993 (age 33)
- Home town: Philadelphia, Pennsylvania, U.S.
- Education: John W. Hallahan Girls High School; University of Central Florida
- Height: 5 ft 8 in (173 cm)
- Weight: 156 lb (71 kg)

Rugby union career
- Position(s): Center (XV), Hooker (7s), Wing (7s)
International career
Years	Team	Apps	(Points)
2017	United States	7	
National sevens team
Years	Team		Comps
2015	United States		
Medal record
Women's rugby sevens
Representing United States
Olympic Games
Bronze medal – third place	2024 Paris	Team competition
Pan American Games
Silver medal – second place	2015 Toronto	Team competition

Kristen Thomas (born July 1, 1993) is an American rugby sevens player. She competed at the 2020 Summer Olympics.

== Early life ==
Thomas participated in track and field and basketball in high school. She began her rugby career as a freshman at the University of Central Florida. She is openly lesbian.

== Career ==
Thomas made her debut for the United States sevens team at the 2015 São Paulo Women's Sevens. She won a silver medal at the 2015 Pan American Games as a member of the United States women's national rugby sevens team.

Thomas missed out on selection for the 2016 Summer Olympics squad due to an injury she sustained at the 2016 France Women's Sevens. She was named in the Eagles 2017 Women's Rugby World Cup squad.

Thomas was selected to represent the United States at the 2022 Rugby World Cup Sevens in Cape Town.
