= Nadejda Popov =

Canadian rugby sevens player

- Born: March 10, 1994 (age 32)

Rugby union career
National sevens team
Years	Team	Comps
2015	Canada 7s	
Medal record
Women's rugby sevens
Representing Canada
Pan American Games
Gold medal – first place	2015 Toronto	Team competition

Nadejda Popov (born March 10, 1994), also known as Nadia Popov, is a Canadian rugby sevens player. She won a gold medal at the 2015 Pan American Games as a member of the Canada women's national rugby sevens team.
