= Paula Ishibashi =

- Full name: Paula Harumi Ishibashi
- Born: February 14, 1985 (age 41)
- Height: 1.56 m (5 ft 1 in)
- Weight: 58 kg (128 lb)

Rugby union career
- Position: Scrum-half
National sevens team
Years	Team	Comps
- Brazil
Medal record
Women's rugby sevens
Representing Brazil
Pan American Games
Bronze medal – third place	2015 Toronto	Team competition

Paula Harumi Ishibashi (born February 14, 1985) is a Brazilian rugby union player. She is the current captain of Brazil's women's sevens team and will be leading them at the 2016 Summer Olympics.

Ishibashi was introduced to rugby sevens through friends and has been a veteran of the team for 10 years. In 2013, she was awarded the Athlete of the Year Award by the Brazilian Olympic Committee. In 2015, she also was awarded the best Rugby Player of 2015 by the Brazilian Olympic Committee.

She won a bronze medal at the 2015 Pan American Games as a member of the Brazil women's rugby sevens team.
