= Kelly Russell (rugby union) =

Canada international rugby union player

- Born: December 7, 1986 (age 39) Bolton, Ontario
- Height: 178 cm (5 ft 10 in)
- Weight: 83 kg (183 lb)
- University: University of Western Ontario
- Notable relative: Laura Russell (sister)

Rugby union career
- Position: Loose forward
Amateur team(s)
Years	Team	Apps	(Points)
–	Toronto Nomads		
–	Western Mustangs		
Senior career
Years	Team	Apps	(Points)
2017	Barbarians		
International career
Years	Team	Apps	(Points)
2007–2017	Canada	35	
National sevens team
Years	Team		Comps
2009-2016	Canada		
Medal record
Representing Canada
Women's rugby sevens
Olympic Games
Bronze medal – third place	2016 Rio de Janeiro	Team competition
Pan American Games
Gold medal – first place	2015 Toronto	Team competition
World Cup 7s
Silver medal – second place	2013 Russia	Team competition
Women's rugby union
World Cup
Silver medal – second place	2014 France	Team competition

Kelly Russell (born December 7, 1986) is a former Canadian rugby union player, and is a coach for the sport. She captained Canada at the 2014 Women's Rugby World Cup and was named to the Dream Team.

== International career ==
Russell has also featured in two Rugby World Cup Sevens in 2009 and 2013.

Kelly and her younger sister Laura were both named in the 2014 World Cup squad.

She won a gold medal at the 2015 Pan American Games as a member of the Canadian women's rugby sevens team.

In 2016, Russell was named to Canada's first ever women's rugby sevens Olympic team. The team won bronze.
