= Fernando Luna (rugby union) =

Argentine rugby sevens player

- Born: May 12, 1990 (age 36)
- Height: 1.89 m (6 ft 2 1/2 in)
- Weight: 95 kg (209 lb; 14 st 13 lb)

Rugby union career
- Position: Fullback
International career
Years	Team	Apps	(Points)
2011	Argentina	1	(15)
2011-2012	Argentina XV		
2009	Argentina U-19	2	(5)
National sevens team
Years	Team		Comps
2011-	Argentina 7s		50
Medal record
Men's rugby sevens
Representing Argentina
Pan American Games
Gold medal – first place	2019 Lima	Team competition

Fernando Luna (born May 12, 1990) is an Argentine rugby sevens player. He was selected for Argentina 7s's sevens squad for the 2016 Summer Olympics.
