= Magali Harvey =

Canada international rugby union player

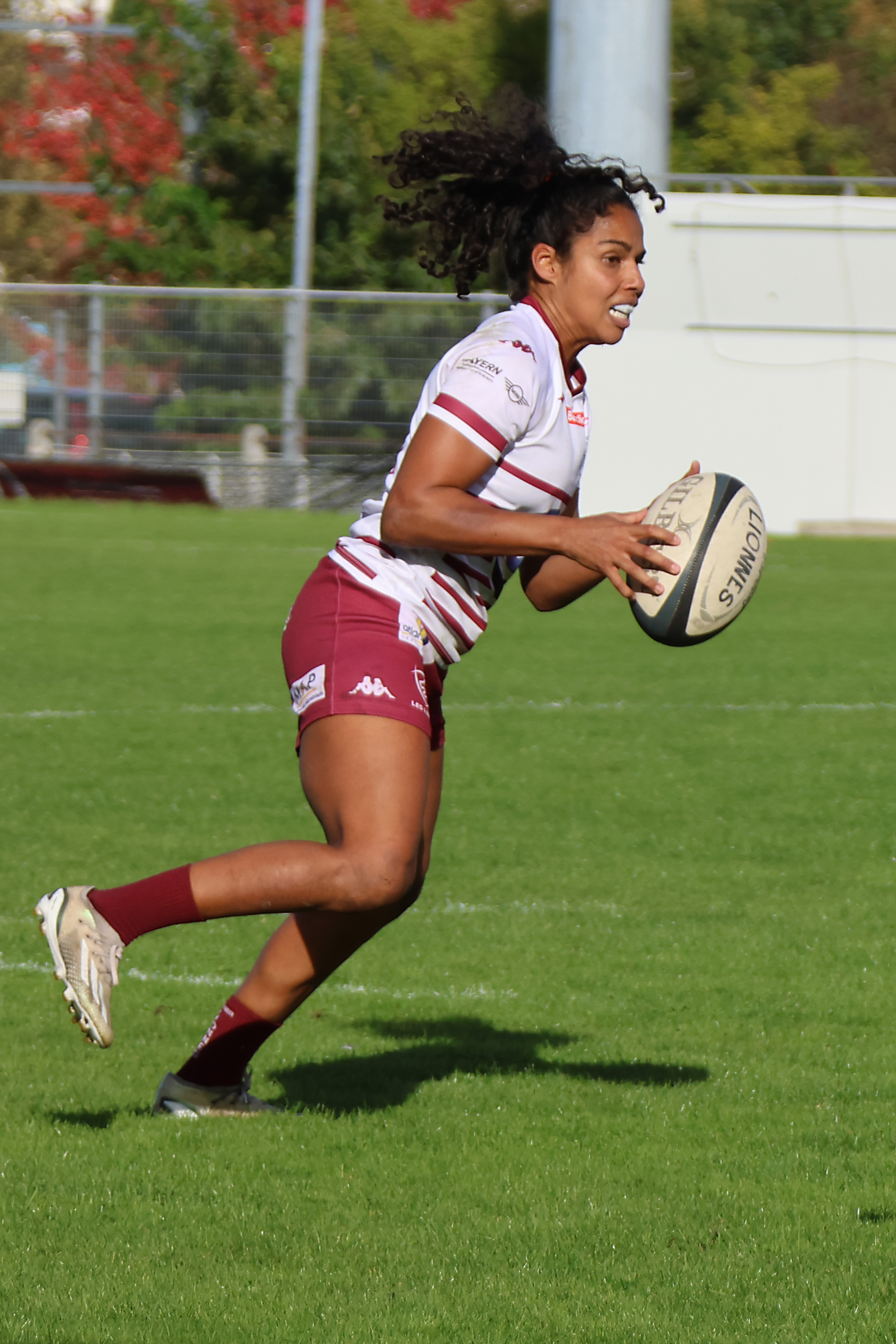
- Born: August 16, 1990 (age 36) Quebec City, Quebec
- Height: 1.65 m (5 ft 5 in)
- Weight: 65 kg (143 lb)
- University: St. Francis Xavier University, Queen's University
- Occupation(s): Broadcaster, Coach

Rugby union career
- Position: Wing
Amateur team(s)
Years	Team	Apps	(Points)
–	Club de Rugby de Québec		
2010-14?	St. Francis Xavier X-Women		
2022-23	Queen's Golden Gaels		
Provincial / State sides
Years	Team	Apps	(Points)
–	Quebec		
International career
Years	Team	Apps	(Points)
–	Canada	29	
- Correct as of 2018-11-16
National sevens team
Years	Team		Comps
2011–2016	Canada		52
Coaching career
- Years: Team
- –: McGill Marlets
Medal record
Representing Canada
Women's rugby union
World Cup
Silver medal – second place	2014 France	Team competition
Women's rugby sevens
Pan American Games
Gold medal – first place	2015 Toronto	Team competition
World Cup 7s
Silver medal – second place	2013 Russia	Team competition

Magali Harvey (born August 16, 1990) is a former Canadian rugby union and sevens player and coach. She represented Canada at numerous sevens tournaments, the 2014 Rugby World Cup, the 2017 Rugby World Cup, as well as playing professionally in New Zealand, Spain, and France. She served as head coach of the McGill Martlets women's rugby program between 2016 and 2021. Harvey is widely considered to be among the best Canadian, and international, womens rugby players ever.

== Early life and education ==
Harvey began playing rugby in high school in Quebec where her speed and elusiveness quickly put her on the radar of Rugby Canada's sevens program, being invited to the U-20 team despite being relatively new to the sport. After graduating from high school and completing a CEGEP, she would enroll at St. Francis Xavier University to study Business Administration, becoming a starter for the X-women rugby program. Harvey's X-women side would go on to win the Canadian University Championships in 2010, where she would be named Atlantic Conference Rookie of the Year and Canadian Championship MVP. Harvey and the X-women would play in the national championship again in 2011 and 2012, winning in 2012.

Harvey would return to a Canadian university rugby program for the 2022-23 season, joining the Queens Gaels to complete an MBA. The Gaels would go on to win an OUA Championship before falling to the Laval Rouge-er-Or in the U Sports title match.

== Rugby career ==
Harvey was first capped for Canada in 2011, joining the women's sevens team. She represented Canada at the 2014 Women's Rugby World Cup. She was named IRB Women’s Player of the Year 2014 and was the first Canadian to receive the award.

She won a gold medal at the 2015 Pan American Games as a member of the Canadian women's rugby sevens team.

== Honors ==
- 2014, WRWC Dream Team
- 2014, International Rugby Players Women’s 15s Try of the Decade
- 2014, IRB Women's Player of the year
- 2020, World Rugby Player of the Decade in 15-a-side rugby (nominee)

== Personal ==
Harvey's father, Luc Harvey was the former Member of Parliament for the riding of Louis-Hébert in Quebec from 2006 to 2008.
