= Ramiro Finco =

Argentine rugby union player (born 1992)

- Born: 10 January 1992 (age 34) Buenos Aires, Argentina
- Height: 1.80 m (5 ft 11 in)
- Weight: 85 kg (13 st 5 lb; 187 lb)

Rugby union career
- Position: Centre
- Current team: Viadana
Youth career
- Curupaytí
Senior career
Years	Team	Apps	(Points)
2012-2016	Curupaytí	6	(0)
2016−2018	Viadana	21	(75)
2019	Curupaytí		
2019−	Viadana		
- Correct as of 18 October 2020
International career
Years	Team	Apps	(Points)
2012	Argentina Under 20	3	(0)
2013−2016	Argentina Sevens	58	(50)
- Correct as of 18 October 2020

Ramiro Finco (born 10 January 1992, Buenos Aires) is an Argentine rugby union player. His usual position is as a Centre and he currently plays for Viadana in Top12.

After playing for Argentina Under 20 in 2012, from 2013 to 2016 Finco was named in the Argentina Sevens for World Rugby Sevens Series.
