= Mariana Ramalho =

Brazilian rugby sevens player

- Full name: Mariana Barbosa Ramalho
- Born: August 17, 1987 (age 39)
- Height: 1.74 m (5 ft 9 in)
- Weight: 69 kg (152 lb)

Rugby union career
National sevens team
Years	Team	Comps
- Brazil
Medal record
Women's rugby sevens
Representing Brazil
Pan American Games
Bronze medal – third place	2015 Toronto	Team competition

Mariana Barbosa Ramalho (born August 17, 1987) is a Brazilian rugby sevens player. She won a bronze medal at the 2015 Pan American Games as a member of the Brazil women's national rugby sevens team.
