= Hannah Darling (rugby union) =

Canadian rugby union player (born 1996)

- Born: May 30, 1996 (age 30) Peterborough, Ontario
- Height: 1.74 m (5 ft 9 in)
- Weight: 72 kg (159 lb)

Rugby union career
- Current team: Peterborough Pagans
International career
Years	Team	Apps	(Points)
–	Canada		
Medal record
Women's rugby sevens
Representing Canada
Olympic Games
Bronze medal – third place	2016 Rio de Janeiro	Team competition
Pan American Games
Gold medal – first place	2015 Toronto	Team competition
Youth Olympic Games
Silver medal – second place	2014 Nanjing	Team competition

Hannah Darling (born May 30, 1996) is a Canadian rugby union player and considered the national seven's team weapon at restarts.

Darling was introduced to rugby union at the age of 14 and made her sevens national debut at the 2014 Hong Kong Invitational Sevens. She won a gold medal at the 2015 Pan American Games as a member of the Canadian women's rugby sevens team. In 2016, Darling was named to Canada's first ever women's rugby sevens Olympic team. In October 2018, she retired from the national sevens team.
