= Beatriz Futuro Muhlbauer =

Brazilian rugby sevens player (born 1986)

Beatriz Mühlbauer
- Full name: Beatriz Futuro Mühlbauer
- Born: February 26, 1986 (age 40)
- Height: 1.72 m (5 ft 8 in)
- Weight: 67 kg (148 lb)

Rugby union career
National sevens team
Years	Team	Comps
2012–present	Brazil	
Medal record
Women's rugby sevens
Representing Brazil
Pan American Games
Bronze medal – third place	2015 Toronto	Team competition
South American Games
Gold medal – first place	2018 Cochabamba	Team competition

Beatriz Futuro Mühlbauer (born February 26, 1986) is a Brazilian rugby sevens player. She won a bronze medal at the 2015 Pan American Games as a member of the Brazil women's national rugby sevens team.

She was selected to represent Brazil in Rugby Sevens at the 2016 Summer Olympics.
