= Axel Müller (rugby union) =

Argentine rugby union player

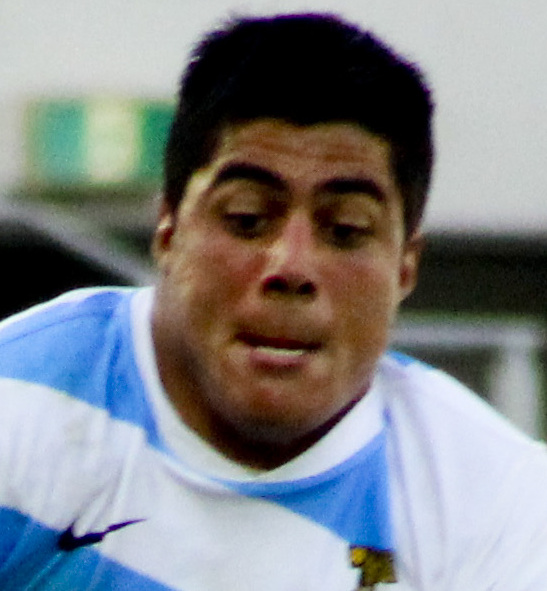
- Full name: Axel Müller Aranda
- Born: 25 November 1993 (age 32)
- Height: 1.83 m (6 ft 0 in)
- Weight: 90 kg (198 lb) Spouse : married Children: 1

Rugby union career
- Position: Wing
Senior career
Years	Team	Apps	(Points)
2016-2017	Toulon	11	(20)
2017-18	Oyonnax Rugby	24	(30)
2018 -	CA Brive	83	(90)
International career
Years	Team	Apps	(Points)
2013	Argentina U-20		
2015-2016	Argentina XV	3	(0)
National sevens team
Years	Team		Comps
2013–present	Argentina 7s		
Medal record
Men's rugby sevens
Representing Argentina
World Games
Silver medal – second place	2013 Cali	Team

Axel Müller Aranda (born 25 November 1993) is an Argentine rugby union player.

Muller has signed with the French rugby club Toulon to play in the Top 14. He represented Argentina's under-20 team at the 2013 IRB Junior World Championship. He was selected to play for Argentina at the 2016 Summer Olympics.

He is a former decathlete and played American football as a youngster. At the age of 9 his father got a job in the United States so he moved with his family and lived in Ahwatukee in Phoenix, Arizona. They moved back to Argentina when he was 17.

== Honours ==
Old Glory DC

- All Major League Ruby Second team (2025)
