= Melissa Fowler =

American rugby sevens player

- Born: March 21, 1992 (age 34)
- Height: 5 ft 10 in (1.77 m)
- Weight: 150 lb (70 kg)

Rugby union career
National sevens team
Years	Team	Comps
- United States
Medal record
Women's rugby sevens
Representing United States
Pan American Games
Silver medal – second place	2015 Toronto	Team competition

Melissa Fowler (born March 21, 1992) is an American rugby sevens player. She won a silver medal at the 2015 Pan American Games as a member of the United States women's national rugby sevens team.
