= Ashley Steacy =

Canadian rugby union player

- Born: June 28, 1987 (age 39) Lethbridge, Alberta
- Height: 1.63 m (5 ft 4 in)
- Weight: 65 kg (143 lb)

Rugby union career
National sevens team
Years	Team	Comps
2013-	Canada 7s	
Medal record
Women's rugby sevens
Representing Canada
Olympic Games
Bronze medal – third place	2016 Rio de Janeiro	Team competition
Pan American Games
Gold medal – first place	2015 Toronto	Team competition
World Cup 7s
Silver medal – second place	2013 Russia	Team competition

Ashley Steacy (née Patzer) (born June 28, 1987) is a Canadian rugby union player. She won a gold medal at the 2015 Pan American Games as a member of the Canadian women's rugby sevens team.

In 2016, Steacy was named to Canada's first ever women's rugby sevens Olympic team which won Bronze at the Rio 2016 Olympics.

== Awards and honors ==
- Lethbridge Pronghorns 2010 Female Athlete of the Year
- U Sports National Women's Rugby Championships Most Valuable Player (2008)
- U Sports Women's Rugby Rookie of the Year (2005)
- U Sports Women's Rugby Athlete of the Year (2006, 2009)
