= Sean Duke =

Canada international rugby union player

- Born: Sean Duke; May 7, 1988 (age 38) Vancouver, British Columbia
- Height: 1.88 m (6 ft 2 in)
- Weight: 89 kg (196 lb)
- University: Queen's University, University of Victoria, UBC Faculty of Medicine

Rugby union career
- Position: Centre/Wing
Amateur team(s)
Years	Team	Apps	(Points)
- UBCOB Ravens
Senior career
Years	Team	Apps	(Points)
- Vikes
International career
Years	Team	Apps	(Points)
2008-2014	Canada	14	(20)
- Correct as of July 6, 2017
National sevens team
Years	Team		Comps
- Canada
Medal record
Men's rugby sevens
Representing Canada
Pan American Games
Silver medal – second place	2019 Lima	Team competition

Sean Duke (born May 7, 1988) is a Canadian rugby union player who has competed for the Canadian national team since 2008.

== Education ==
After studying for two years at Queen's University, he transferred to the University of Victoria to complete his BSc in Kinesiology after 4 additional years due to rugby commitments. He completed his MSc in Kinesiology at the University of Victoria in two and a half years also due to rugby commitments. He retired from rugby in late 2016 due to a back injury and due to beginning studies for an MD at the University of British Columbia, but was later invited to play for a Canadian test series in June 2017.
