= Haline Scatrut =

Brazilian rugby sevens player

- Full name: Haline Leme Scatrut
- Born: 9 August 1992 (age 34)
- Height: 1.69 m (5 ft 7 in)
- Weight: 64 kg (141 lb)

Rugby union career
Amateur team(s)
| Years | Team | Apps | (Points) |
- Curitiba Rugby Clube
National sevens team
| Years | Team | | Comps |
| 2014–present | Brazil | | |
Medal record
Women's rugby sevens
Representing Brazil
Pan American Games
| Bronze medal – third place | 2015 Toronto | Team competition |
South American Games
| Gold medal – first place | 2018 Cochabamba | Team competition |

Haline Leme Scatrut (born 9 August 1992) is a Brazilian rugby sevens player. She won a bronze medal at the 2015 Pan American Games as a member of the Brazil women's national rugby sevens team. She was named in Brazil's women's sevens team to the 2016 Summer Olympics.
