= Bruna Lotufo =

- Full name: Bruna Pamela Lotufo
- Born: April 7, 1984 (age 42)
- Height: 1.62 m (5 ft 4 in)
- Weight: 62 kg (137 lb; 9 st 11 lb)

Rugby union career
National sevens team
Years	Team	Comps
- Brazil
Medal record
Women's rugby sevens
Representing Brazil
Pan American Games
Bronze medal – third place	2015 Toronto	Team competition

Bruna Pamela Lotufo (born April 7, 1984) is a Brazilian rugby sevens player. She won a bronze medal at the 2015 Pan American Games as a member of the Brazil women's national rugby sevens team.
