= Megan Bonny =

American rugby sevens player

- Born: March 6, 1990 (age 36)
- Height: 1.72 m (5 ft 8 in)
- Weight: 72 kg (159 lb; 11 st 5 lb)

Rugby union career
National sevens team
Years	Team	Comps
- United States
Medal record
Women's rugby sevens
Representing United States
Pan American Games
Silver medal – second place	2015 Toronto	Team competition

Megan Bonny (born March 6, 1990) is an American rugby sevens player. She won a silver medal at the 2015 Pan American Games as a member of the United States women's national rugby sevens team.
