= Richelle Stephens =

Richelle Gapasin

- Born: July 22, 1996 (age 30) Fallbrook, California
- Height: 1.70 m (5 ft 7 in)
- Weight: 61 kg (134 lb)

Rugby union career
National sevens team
Years	Team	Comps
- United States
Medal record
Women's rugby sevens
Representing United States
Pan American Games
Silver medal – second place	2015 Toronto	Team competition

Richelle Stephens (born July 22, 1996) is an American rugby sevens player. She won a silver medal at the 2015 Pan American Games as a member of the United States women's national rugby sevens team.
