= Cláudia Teles =

- Full name: Cláudia Jaqueline Lopes Teles
- Born: January 2, 1992 (age 34)
- Height: 1.69 m (5 ft 7 in)
- Weight: 57 kg (126 lb)

Rugby union career
National sevens team
Years	Team	Comps
2015–present	Brazil	
Medal record
Women's rugby sevens
Representing Brazil
Pan American Games
Bronze medal – third place	2015 Toronto	Team competition

Cláudia Jaqueline Lopes Teles (born January 2, 1992) is a Brazilian rugby sevens player. She won a bronze medal at the 2015 Pan American Games as a member of the Brazil women's national rugby sevens team. She was named in Brazil's women's sevens squad for the 2016 Summer Olympics.
