= Edna Santini =

Brazil international rugby league, union & sevens player

- Born: 15 July 1992 (age 34)
- Height: 1.53 m (5 ft 0 in)
- Weight: 53 kg (8 st 5 lb)

Rugby union career
- Position: Centre
Senior career
Years	Team	Apps	(Points)
	São José		(0)
International career
Years	Team	Apps	(Points)
	Brazil	12	(10)
National sevens team
Years	Team		Comps
2012–	Brazil		
- Rugby league career

Playing information
Representative
Years	Team	Pld	T	G	FG	P
2021	Brazil	3	1	0	0	4
Medal record
Women's rugby sevens
Representing Brazil
Pan American Games
Bronze medal – third place	2015 Toronto	Team competition

Edna Santini (born 15 July 1992) is a Brazilian rugby league, rugby union and sevens player.

== Rugby career ==
Santini won a bronze medal at the 2015 Pan American Games as a member of the Brazil women's national rugby sevens team. She was selected for Brazil women's national rugby sevens team for the 2016 Summer Olympics.

She represented Brazil in the 2021 Rugby League World Cup.

In July 2023, she was named in Brazil's fifteens team to play Colombia for a spot in the inaugural WXV competition. She scored a try in her sides 23–24 loss to Colombia in their first match.

In July 2025, she was named in Brazil's fifteens squad for the Women's Rugby World Cup in England.
