= Lauren Doyle =

American rugby sevens player (born 1991)

Lauren Doyle OLY
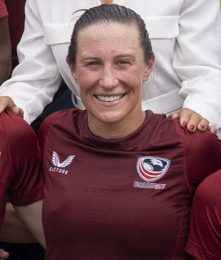
- Doyle at the 2024 Summer Olympics

Personal information
- Born: February 23, 1991 (age 35) Springfield, Illinois, U.S.
- Education: Meridian High School; Eastern Illinois University
- Height: 5 ft 6 in (168 cm)
- Weight: 150 lb (68 kg)

Rugby union career
- Position: Fly half/center (7s)
National sevens team
Years	Team	Comps
2012-	United States	
Medal record
Women's rugby sevens
Representing United States
Olympic Games
Bronze medal – third place	2024 Paris	Team competition
Pan American Games
Silver medal – second place	2015 Toronto	Team competition

Lauren Doyle (born February 23, 1991) is an American rugby sevens player. She won a silver medal at the 2015 Pan American Games as a member of the United States women's national rugby sevens team and represented the United States at 3 Olympic Games: 2016, 2020, and 2024.

Doyle captained the U.S. Eagles rugby sevens team at the 2022 Rugby World Cup Sevens in Cape Town.

Doyle now hosts a Podcast with USA Rugby teammate Kristi Kirshe called "Chasing Eagles" where they discuss news and updates about USA Rugby.

== Rugby career ==
=== United States National Team ===
Doyle is a three-time United States Olympian, playing in the 2016 Summer Olympics in Rio de Janeiro, 2020 Summer Olympics in Tokyo, and 2024 Summer Olympics in Paris. Doyle and the Eagles finished in 5th place in Rio, 6th in Tokyo, and earned a bronze medal in Paris.

Doyle was nominated for the UL Mark of Excellence in HSBC World Rugby Sevens Series Awards in 2020.
