= Irene Gardner =

American rugby sevens player

- Born: March 20, 1985 (age 41)
- Height: 5 ft 4 in (1.62 m)
- Weight: 128 lb (58 kg)

Rugby union career
National sevens team
Years	Team	Comps
- United States
Medal record
Women's rugby sevens
Representing United States
Pan American Games
Silver medal – second place	2015 Toronto	Team competition

Irene Gardner (born March 20, 1985) is an American rugby sevens player. She won a silver medal at the 2015 Pan American Games as a member of the United States women's national rugby sevens team.
