= Kelly Griffin =

American rugby sevens player

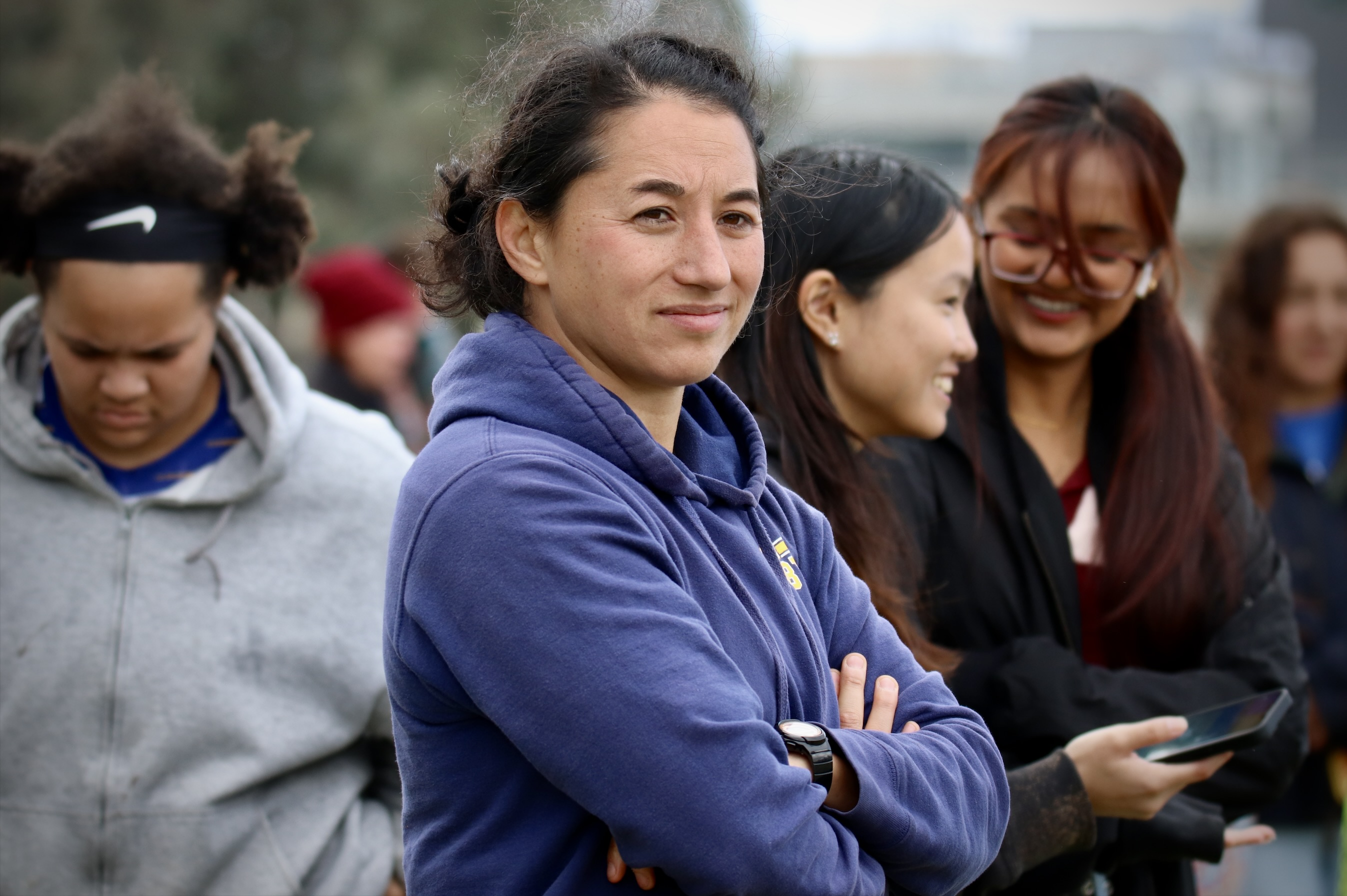
- Griffin in 2025 coaching
- Born: Berkeley, California, U.S.
- Education: Berkeley High School; University of California, Los Angeles
- Height: 5 ft 4 in (163 cm)
- Weight: 145 lb (66 kg)

Rugby union career
- Position: Hooker
National sevens team
Years	Team	Comps
2011-2018	United States 7s	27
Coaching career
- Years: Team
- 2019–present: UCSB W. Rugby
- 2021–present: USA Rugby Pathways (assistant)
- 2021–2022: Northern Loonies
- 2023–2024: Golden State Retrievers
Medal record
Women's rugby sevens
Representing United States
Rugby World Cup Sevens
Bronze medal – third place	2013 Moscow	Team competition
Pan American Games
Silver medal – second place	2015 Toronto	Team competition
NACRA Championship
Gold medal – first place	2015 North Carolina	Team competition

Kelly Griffin (born November 7) is an American rugby sevens player and Olympian. As a member of the United States women's national rugby sevens team, she won a bronze medal at the 2013 Rugby World Cup Sevens, and a silver medal at the 2015 Pan American Games. She was also captain of the United States Women's Rugby Sevens team for the 2016 Summer Olympics in Rio de Janeiro, Brazil.

== Early life and high school ==
Kelly Griffin was born and raised in Berkeley, California and played soccer and basketball starting at the age of 6. She attended Berkeley High School in Berkeley, California, where she played basketball for coach Gene Nakamura, who called Griffin's 2003 team the group he was "most fond of" from his 24 seasons as head coach.

== Collegiate rugby ==
Griffin moved from Berkeley to Los Angeles to attend UCLA in 2004, and her freshman she year joined the UCLA Women's Club Rugby team, known as the UCLA Bruin Rangers. She helped lead UCLA to several national playoff appearances, and was named a USA Rugby AIG Women’s Collegiate All-American in 2007 and 2008. Additionally she was selected for the USA Rugby Under-23 team in 2006 and 2007.

== Women's Premier League ==
After graduating from UCLA with an applied math degree in 2008, Griffin returned to the San Francisco Bay Area and joined the Berkeley All Blues Women's Rugby Club. During the 2011 season of the Women's Premier League, Griffin won the 7s National Championship with the All Blues and was named tournament Most Valued Player. The All Blues also won the 2011 Women's Premier League Championship, with Griffin leading the league in tries scored. Additionally, Griffin won the 2011 Women's All-Star National Championship with Pacific Coast team, rounding out her three championships in a six-month period.

== USA Rugby Eagles Women's Sevens ==
In early 2012, Griffin signed a full-time training contract with USA Rugby, and along with 7 other women, became the first professional female rugby players in the United States. Griffin moved to Chula Vista, California to train at the Olympic Training Center with the rest of the contracted 7s players. From 2011/2012 on, Griffin has played in the World Rugby Women's Sevens Series, captaining the USA team for several tournaments. Additionally, going into the 2016 Summer Olympics, Griffin leads the country in appearances on the World Sevens Series Circuit, and is the only athlete of the "original eight" to have remained in residency throughout the four-year lead up to the 2016 Olympics.

In addition to the World Rugby Women's Sevens Series, Griffin competed with the USA Eagles Sevens at the 2013 Rugby World Cup Sevens. After an undefeated campaign in pool play, the USA went on to claim the bronze medal by beating Spain in sudden death overtime 10-5 in the 3rd place match.

In June 2015, Griffin was selected as captain of the USA Women's Sevens team for the North American and Caribbean Rugby Association Championship, which also served as an Olympic qualifying tournament. The USA would win the NACRA gold medal, and also qualify for the 2016 Rio Summer Olympics by beating Mexico in the Championship game, 88-0 .

In July 2015, Griffin competed as part of Team USA at the 2015 Pan American Games in Toronto. The United States women's 7s team lost to Canada in the gold medal match, leaving the tournament with silver.

On July 18, 2016, Griffin was named as captain of the USA Women's Olympic Rugby Team, which competed in the 2016 Rio Summer Olympics, the inaugural Olympiad to include women's rugby.

=== Competitive History with the USA Eagles Women's Sevens ===
==== World Rugby Women's Sevens Series ====
- 2011/2012 IRB Women's Sevens Challenge Cup (Precursor to the Women's Sevens Series)
- 2012/2013 World Rugby Women's Sevens Series (USA: Finished 4th)
- 2013/2014 World Rugby Women's Sevens Series (USA: Finished 7th)
- 2014/2015 World Rugby Women's Sevens Series (USA: Finished 5th)
- 2015/2016 World Rugby Women's Sevens Series (USA: Finished 6th)

==== Rugby World Cup Sevens ====
- 2013 Rugby World Cup Sevens (USA: Bronze Medal)
- 2018 Rugby World Cup Sevens (USA: 4th Place)

==== NACRA Women's Sevens Championship ====
- 2015 NACRA Championship, 2016 Olympic Qualifying Event (USA: Gold Medal)

==== Pan America Games ====
- 2015 Pan American Games (USA: Silver Medal)

==== Olympic Games ====
- 2016 Summer Olympics (USA: 5th)

== Coaching career ==
Since 2019, Griffin has been the head coach of the University of California, Santa Barbara Gauchos women's rugby team.

In 2021, Griffin was named the head coach of the Loonies women's team for the Premier Rugby Sevens Inaugural Championship in Memphis, TN. She would lead the Loonies to their first women's championship, behind performances from stars Alev Kelter, Joanne Fa'avesi and Delaney Aikens. She would continue to coach the Loonies again in the 2022 Series where they would finish runner up.

In 2023, the league announced that Griffin would become the head coach of the expansion Golden State Retrievers women's team. Griffin's local ties to the Bay Area were a key part in moving coaching roles.
