= Hannah Lopez =

- Born: March 31, 1992 (age 34)
- Height: 1.67 m (5 ft 6 in)
- Weight: 58 kg (128 lb; 9 st 2 lb)

Rugby union career
National sevens team
Years	Team	Comps
- United States
Medal record
Women's rugby sevens
Representing United States
Pan American Games
Silver medal – second place	2015 Toronto	Team competition

Hannah Lopez (born March 31, 1992) is an American rugby sevens player. She won a silver medal at the 2015 Pan American Games as a member of the United States women's national rugby sevens team.
