= Natasha Watcham-Roy =

Canadian rugby union player

- Born: April 28, 1992 (age 34) Ottawa, Ontario
- Height: 1.70 m (5 ft 7 in)
- Weight: 67 kg (148 lb)

Rugby union career
National sevens team
Years	Team	Comps
2015-	Canada 7s	
Medal record
Women's rugby sevens
Representing Canada
Olympic Games
Bronze medal – third place	2016 Rio de Janeiro	Team competition
Pan American Games
Gold medal – first place	2015 Toronto	Team competition

Natasha Watcham-Roy (born April 28, 1992) is a Canadian former rugby union player. She won a gold medal at the 2015 Pan American Games as a member of the Canadian women's rugby sevens team.

In 2016, Watcham-Roy was named to Canada's first ever women's rugby sevens Olympic team. In August 2018, she stepped away from the program. On 22 November 2018, she announced her retirement due to mental health issues.
