= Rodrigo Etchart =

Argentine rugby sevens player

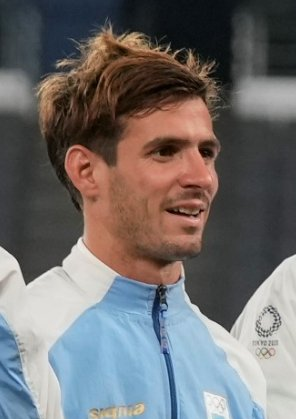
- Etchart in 2021
- Born: 24 January 1994 (age 32) Buenos Aires, Argentina
- Height: 175 cm (5 ft 9 in)
- Weight: 80 kg (176 lb; 12 st 8 lb)

Rugby union career
- Position: Wing
- Current team: SIC
Senior career
Years	Team	Apps	(Points)
2013–2018	SIC	43	(85)
- Correct as of 22 July 2021
International career
Years	Team	Apps	(Points)
2013–2014	Argentina U20	6	(5)
2016–2018	Argentina XV	8	(25)
- Correct as of 22 July 2021
National sevens team
Years	Team		Comps
2014–2021	Argentina		34
- Correct as of 22 July 2021
Medal record
Representing Argentina
Men's rugby sevens
Summer Olympics
Bronze medal – third place	2020 Tokyo	Team competition

Rodrigo Etchart (born January 24, 1994) is an Argentine rugby sevens player. He was named in Argentina 7s's sevens team for the 2016 Summer Olympics.
