= Colombia at the 2016 Summer Olympics =

- IOC code: COL
- NOC: Colombian Olympic Committee
- Website: www.olimpicocol.co (in Spanish)

in Rio de Janeiro
- Competitors: 147 in 23 sports
- Flag bearers: Yuri Alvear (opening); Ingrit Valencia (closing)
- Medals Ranked 22nd: Gold 3 Silver 2 Bronze 3 Total 8

Summer Olympics appearances (overview)
- 1932; 1936; 1948; 1952; 1956; 1960; 1964; 1968; 1972; 1976; 1980; 1984; 1988; 1992; 1996; 2000; 2004; 2008; 2012; 2016; 2020; 2024; 2028

Colombia competed at the 2016 Summer Olympics in Rio de Janeiro, Brazil, from 5 to 21 August 2016. This was the nation's nineteenth appearance at the Summer Olympics. The Colombian Olympic Committee (Spanish: Comité Olímpico Colombiano) sent the nation's largest ever delegation to the Games, with 147 athletes, 74 men and 73 women, competing across 23 sports.

Colombia returned home from Rio de Janeiro with a total of eight medals (three gold, two silver, and three bronze), marking the nation's most successful outcome in Summer Olympic history based on the gold medal count. Moreover, it matched the overall medal tally from the 2012 Summer Olympics in London. Two of these medals were awarded to the Colombian team in BMX cycling, boxing, and weightlifting, and one each in athletics and judo.

The nation's most significant highlight of the Games came from BMX rider Mariana Pajón, who successfully defended her title in the women's race and set a record as the first Colombian to receive two Olympic gold medals. Apart from Pajón, triple jumper Caterine Ibargüen, and weightlifting veteran Óscar Figueroa also helped the Colombians bring home more golds from Rio de Janeiro than ever before, with Figueroa becoming the first male from his country to top the podium at his fourth and final Olympics.

Boxers Yuberjen Martínez (men's light flyweight) and Ingrit Valencia (women's flyweight) brought home medals in their signature sport, last achieved at the 1988. Judoka and triple world titlist Yuri Alvear joined Pajon and freestyle wrestler Jackeline Rentería as the only Colombian women to win two Olympic medals, with a silver medal in the women's 70 kg division. The remaining medals went to BMX rider Carlos Ramírez in the men's race, and weightlifter Luis Javier Mosquera, who received the bronze in the men's 69 kg, following the disqualification of Kyrgyzstan's Izzat Artykov over a doping offense.

== Medalists ==
Medal	Name	Sport	Event	Date
Gold	Óscar Figueroa	Weightlifting	Men's 62 kg	8 August
Gold	Caterine Ibargüen	Athletics	Women's triple jump	14 August
Gold	Mariana Pajón	Cycling	Women's BMX	19 August
Silver	Yuri Alvear	Judo	Women's 70 kg	10 August
Silver	Yuberjen Martínez	Boxing	Men's light flyweight	14 August
Bronze	Luis Javier Mosquera	Weightlifting	Men's 69 kg	9 August
Bronze	Ingrit Valencia	Boxing	Women's flyweight	18 August
Bronze	Carlos Ramírez	Cycling	Men's BMX	19 August

Medals by sport
Sport	1st place, gold medalist(s)	2nd place, silver medalist(s)	3rd place, bronze medalist(s)	Total
Cycling	1	0	1	2
Weightlifting	1	0	1	2
Athletics	1	0	0	1
Boxing	0	1	1	2
Judo	0	1	0	1
Total	3	2	3	8

Medals by gender
Gender	1st place, gold medalist(s)	2nd place, silver medalist(s)	3rd place, bronze medalist(s)	Total	Percentage
Female	2	1	1	4	50%
Male	1	1	2	4	50%
Mixed	0	0	0	0	0%
Total	3	2	3	8	100%

== Competitors ==
The Colombian Olympic Committee (Spanish: Comité Olímpico Colombiano) confirmed a team of 147 athletes, 74 men and 73 women, to compete across 23 sports at the Games. It was the nation's largest ever delegation sent to the Olympics, breaking its previous record of 104 athletes set in London four years earlier.

Football (for both men and women) and women's rugby sevens were the only team-based sports in which Colombia qualified for the Games, with the men's football squad returning to the Olympic tournament for the first time in 24 years. For individual-based sports, Colombia marked its Olympic debut in golf (new to the 2016 Games) and synchronized swimming.

Track and field accounted for the largest number of athletes on the Colombian team by an individual sport, with 34 entries. There was a single competitor each in golf, sailing, shooting, and table tennis.

Eight of the nation's Olympic medalists from London 2012 returned, including defending champion Mariana Pajón in the women's BMX race, triple jumper Caterine Ibargüen, weightlifter and four-time Olympian Óscar Figueroa (men's 69 kg), judoka and triple world titleist Yuri Alvear (women's 70 kg), BMX rider Carlos Oquendo, professional road cyclist Rigoberto Urán, taekwondo fighter Óscar Muñoz (men's 58 kg), and freestyle wrestler Jackeline Rentería, who became the first Colombian woman in history to earn two Olympic medals. 50-year-old trap shooter Danilo Caro headlined the full roster of Colombian athletes by competing at his record fifth Olympics. Along with Figueroa, three Colombian athletes also vied for their fourth consecutive appearance, including race walker Luis Fernando López, backstroke swimmer Omar Pinzón, and weightlifter Ubaldina Valoyes (women's 75 kg).

18-year-old relay track sprinter Anthony Zambrano was Colombia's youngest competitor, with show jumper René Lopez rounding out the field as the oldest competitor (aged 52). Artistic gymnast Jossimar Calvo was initially selected through a nationwide online text-message voting to carry the Colombian flag, but forced to decline the honor due to his competition schedule on the first day of the Games. Instead, Alvear, who entered the Games with a bronze medal from London 2012 and three world titles, took over Calvo's spot at the last minute to lead the Colombian team at the opening ceremony.

The following is the list of number of competitors participating in the Games. Note that reserves in fencing and football are not counted as athletes:

Sport	Men	Women	Total
Archery	1	3	4
Athletics	18	16	34
Boxing	4	1	5
Cycling	11	4	15
Diving	3	1	4
Equestrian	2	0	2
Fencing	1	1	2
Football	18	18	36
Golf	0	1	1
Gymnastics	1	1	2
Judo	0	2	2
Rugby sevens	0	12	12
Sailing	1	0	1
Shooting	1	0	1
Swimming	3	1	4
Synchronized swimming	0	2	2
Table tennis	0	1	1
Taekwondo	1	1	2
Tennis	2	1	3
Weightlifting	5	4	9
Wrestling	2	3	5
Total	74	73	147

== Archery ==
Three Colombian archers qualified for the women's events after having secured a top eight finish in the team recurve at the 2015 World Archery Championships in Copenhagen, Denmark. Another Colombian archer also qualified for the men's individual recurve by obtaining one of the eight Olympic places available from the same tournament.

Athlete	Event	Ranking round		Round of 64	Round of 32	Round of 16	Quarterfinals	Semifinals	Final / BM	
Athlete	Event	Score	Seed	Opposition Score	Opposition Score	Opposition Score	Opposition Score	Opposition Score	Opposition Score	Rank
Andrés Pila	Men's individual	654	43	Mohamad (MAS); L 0–6	Did not advance					
Carolina Aguirre	Women's individual	605	52	Sartori (ITA); L 0–6	Did not advance					
Ana Rendón	Women's individual	641	18	Bjerendal (SWE); L 2–6	Did not advance					
Natalia Sánchez	Women's individual	609	48	Perova (RUS); L 5–6	Did not advance					
Carolina Aguirre; Ana Rendón; Natalia Sánchez	Women's team	1855	10	—N/a		India; L 3–5	Did not advance			

== Athletics (track and field) ==
Colombian athletes have so far achieved qualifying standards in the following athletics events (up to a maximum of 3 athletes in each event):

Key

- Note–Ranks given for track events are within the athlete's heat only
- Q = Qualified for the next round
- q = Qualified for the next round as a fastest loser or, in field events, by position without achieving the qualifying target
- NR = National record
- N/A = Round not applicable for the event
- Bye = Athlete not required to compete in round

Track & road events
Men

Athlete	Event	Heat		Semifinal		Final	
Athlete	Event	Result	Rank	Result	Rank	Result	Rank
Éider Arévalo	20 km walk	—N/a				1:21:36	15
Bernardo Baloyes	200 m	20.78	8	Did not advance			
Diego Colorado	Marathon	—N/a				2:31:20	125
Gerard Giraldo	Marathon	—N/a				2:23:48	88
Luis Fernando López	20 km walk	—N/a				1:22:32	29
José Leonardo Montaña	50 km walk	—N/a				DNF	
Diego Palomeque	400 m	46.48	6	Did not advance			
James Rendón	50 km walk	—N/a				DSQ	
Yeison Rivas	110 m hurdles	13.87	2	Did not advance			
Rafith Rodríguez	800 m	1:46.65	5	Did not advance			
Andrés Ruiz	Marathon	—N/a				2:22:09	79
Jorge Armando Ruiz	50 km walk	—N/a				3:51:42	17
Manuel Esteban Soto	20 km walk	—N/a				1:20:36	9
Bernardo Baloyes; Carlos Lemos; Diego Palomeque; Jhon Perlaza; Anthony Zambrano	4 × 400 m relay	3:01.84	6	—N/a		Did not advance	

Women

Athlete	Event	Heat		Quarterfinal		Semifinal		Final	
Athlete	Event	Result	Rank	Result	Rank	Result	Rank	Result	Rank
Erika Abril	Marathon	—N/a						2:44:05	73
Sandra Arenas	20 km walk	—N/a						1:35:40	32
Kellys Arias	Marathon	—N/a						DNF	
Yeseida Carrillo	20 km walk	—N/a						1:36:28	38
Muriel Coneo	1500 m	4:09.50	10	—N/a		Did not advance			
Sandra Galvis	20 km walk	—N/a						DNF	
Brigitte Merlano	100 m hurdles	13.09	5	—N/a		Did not advance			
Angie Orjuela	Marathon	—N/a						2:37:05	43
Eliecith Palacios	100 m	Bye		11.48	5	Did not advance			
Evelyn Rivera	100 m	Bye		11.59	6	Did not advance			

Field events

Athlete	Event	Qualification		Final	
Athlete	Event	Distance	Position	Distance	Position
Jhon Murillo	Men's triple jump	16.78	8 q	17.09 NR	5
Mauricio Ortega	Men's discus throw	61.62	18	Did not advance	
Caterine Ibargüen	Women's triple jump	14.52	1 Q	15.17	1st place, gold medalist(s)
Sandra Lemos	Women's shot put	16.46	31	Did not advance	
Flor Ruiz	Women's javelin throw	62.32	9 q	61.54	9
Yosiris Urrutia	Triple jump	13.95	20	Did not advance	

Combined events – Women's heptathlon

Athlete	Event	100H	HJ	SP	200 m	LJ	JT	800 m	Final	Rank
Evelis Aguilar	Result	13.84	1.74	13.60	24.12	6.23	46.90	2:14.32	6263	15
Evelis Aguilar	Points	1001	903	767	969	921	800	902	6263	15

== Boxing ==
Colombia has entered five boxers to compete in each of the following weight classes into the Olympic boxing tournament. Yuberjen Martinez, Jorge Vivas, and Ingrit Valencia had claimed their Olympic spots at the 2016 American Qualification Tournament in Buenos Aires, Argentina. Juan Carlos Carrillo and Ceiber Ávila rounded out the Colombian roster at the 2016 APB and WSB Olympic Qualifier in Vargas, Venezuela.

Athlete	Event	Round of 32	Round of 16	Quarterfinals	Semifinals	Final	
Athlete	Event	Opposition Result	Opposition Result	Opposition Result	Opposition Result	Opposition Result	Rank
Yuberjen Martínez	Men's light flyweight	Lourenço (BRA); W 3–0	Ladon (PHI); W 3–0	Carmona (ESP); W 2–1	Argilagos (CUB); W 2–1	Dusmatov (UZB); L 0–3	2nd place, silver medalist(s)
Ceiber Ávila	Men's flyweight	Bye	Emigdio (MEX); W 3–0	Aloyan (RUS); L 0–3	Did not Advance		
Jorge Vivas	Men's middleweight	Ntsengue (CMR); L 1–2	Did not Advance				
Juan Carlos Carrillo	Men's light heavyweight	Adylbek Uulu (KGZ); W 3–0	Bauderlique (FRA); L 0–3	Did not Advance			
Ingrit Valencia	Women's flyweight	—N/a	Mbougnade (CAF); W TKO	Laopeam (THA); W 3–0	Ourahmoune (FRA); L 1–2	Did not advance	3rd place, bronze medalist(s)

== Cycling ==
=== Road ===
Colombian riders qualified for a maximum of five quota places in the men's Olympic road race by virtue of their top 5 final national ranking in the 2015 UCI World Tour. One additional spot was awarded to the Colombian cyclist in the women's road race by virtue of her top 100 individual placement in the 2016 UCI World Rankings. The men's road cycling team, headlined by world no. 5 rider Nairo Quintana and London 2012 silver medalist Rigoberto Urán, were named to the Olympic roster on 17 April 2016. However, Quintana stepped back, admitting that he decided to focus on the upcoming Vuelta a España instead.

Athlete	Event	Time	Rank
Esteban Chaves	Men's road race	6:13:39	21
Sergio Henao	Men's road race	Did not finish	
Miguel Ángel López	Men's road race	Did not finish	
Jarlinson Pantano	Men's road race	Did not finish	
Rigoberto Urán	Men's road race	Did not finish	
Rigoberto Urán	Men's time trial	Did not start	
Ana Sanabria	Women's road race	4:01:29	40

=== Track ===
Following the completion of the 2016 UCI Track Cycling World Championships, Colombian riders have accumulated five spots in both the men's and women's sprint, men's and women's keirin, and men's omnium, by virtue of their final individual Olympic rankings in those events. The full track cycling team was named to the Colombian roster for the Games on 6 July 2016.

Sprint

Athlete	Event	Qualification		Round 1	Repechage 1	Round 2	Repechage 2	Quarterfinals	Semifinals	Final	
Athlete	Event	Time Speed (km/h)	Rank	Opposition Time Speed (km/h)	Opposition Time Speed (km/h)	Opposition Time Speed (km/h)	Opposition Time Speed (km/h)	Opposition Time Speed (km/h)	Opposition Time Speed (km/h)	Opposition Time Speed (km/h)	Rank
Fabián Puerta	Men's sprint	9.981; 72.137	16 Q	Glaetzer (AUS); L	Sarnecki (POL); Pervis (FRA); W 10.272; 70.093	Kenny (GBR); L	Xu C (CHN); Webster (NZL); L	Did not advance		9th place final Webster (NZL); Levy (GER); Hoogland (NED); L	10
Santiago Ramírez	Men's sprint	10.199; 70.595	23	Did not advance							
Juliana Gaviria	Women's sprint	11.505; 62.581	24	Did not advance							

Keirin

Athlete	Event	1st Round	Repechage	2nd Round	Final
Athlete	Event	Rank	Rank	Rank	Rank
Fabián Puerta	Men's keirin	2 Q	Bye	3 Q	5
Martha Bayona	Women's keirin	3 R	1 Q	DNF	10

Omnium

Athlete	Event	Scratch race		Individual pursuit			Elimination race		Time trial			Flying lap			Points race		Total points	Rank
Athlete	Event	Rank	Points	Time	Rank	Points	Rank	Points	Time	Rank	Points	Time	Rank	Points	Points	Rank	Total points	Rank
Fernando Gaviria	Men's omnium	8	26	4:26.649	10	22	3	36	1:02.469	4	34	13.273	10	22	41	1	181	4

=== Mountain biking ===
Colombia has qualified one mountain biker for the men's Olympic cross-country race, by virtue of a top two national finish, not yet qualified, at the Pan American Championships.

Athlete	Event	Time	Rank
Jhonnatan Botero Villegas	Men's cross-country	1:35:44	5

=== BMX ===
Colombian riders qualified for two men's and one women's quota place in BMX at the Olympics, as a result of the nation's seventh-place finish for men and fourth for women in the UCI Olympic Ranking List of 31 May 2016. Reigning Olympic champion Mariana Pajón, London 2012 bronze medalist Carlos Oquendo, and rookie Carlos Ramírez were named to the Colombian team at the conclusion of the World Championships on 29 May 2016.

Athlete	Event	Seeding		Quarterfinal		Semifinal		Final	
Athlete	Event	Result	Rank	Points	Rank	Points	Rank	Result	Rank
Carlos Oquendo	Men's BMX	35.341	14	9	2 Q	14	6	Did not advance	
Carlos Ramírez	Men's BMX	35.423	19	11	4 Q	11	3 Q	35.517	3rd place, bronze medalist(s)
Mariana Pajón	Women's BMX	34.508	1	—N/a		3	1 Q	34.093	1st place, gold medalist(s)

== Diving ==
Colombian divers qualified for three individual spots at the Olympics by virtue of a top 18 finish respectively at the 2016 FINA World Cup series.

Athlete	Event	Preliminaries		Semifinals		Final	
Athlete	Event	Points	Rank	Points	Rank	Points	Rank
Sebastián Morales	Men's 3 m springboard	447.05	5 Q	406.55	11 Q	364.50	12
Víctor Ortega	Men's 10 m platform	386.85	20	Did not advance			
Sebastián Villa	Men's 10 m platform	350.40	25	Did not advance			
Diana Pineda	Women's 3 m springboard	276.90	23	Did not advance			

== Equestrian ==
Colombia has entered two riders into the Olympic equestrian competition by virtue of a top six individual finish at the 2015 Pan American Games.

=== Jumping ===
Athlete	Horse	Event	Qualification								Final					Total	
Athlete	Horse	Event	Round 1		Round 2			Round 3			Round A		Round B			Total	
Athlete	Horse	Event	Penalties	Rank	Penalties	Total	Rank	Penalties	Total	Rank	Penalties	Rank	Penalties	Total	Rank	Penalties	Rank
Daniel Bluman	Apardi	Individual	15	63	Did not advance												
René Lopez	Con Dios III	Individual	8	=53 Q	13	21	=55	Did not advance									

== Fencing ==
Colombia has entered two fencers into the Olympic competition. London 2012 Olympian Saskia Loretta van Erven Garcia had claimed an Olympic spot in the women's foil as the highest-ranked fencer from America outside the world's top 14 in the FIE Adjusted Official Rankings. Meanwhile, Jhon Edison Rodríguez rounded out the Colombian roster as the sole winner of the men's épée at the Pan American Zonal Qualifier in San José, Costa Rica.

Athlete	Event	Round of 64	Round of 32	Round of 16	Quarterfinal	Semifinal	Final / BM	
Athlete	Event	Opposition Score	Opposition Score	Opposition Score	Opposition Score	Opposition Score	Opposition Score	Rank
Jhon Édison Rodríguez	Men's épée	Karyuchenko (UKR); W 15–7	Imre (HUN); L 8–15	Did not advance				
Saskia Loretta van Erven Garcia	Women's foil	Bye	Mohamed (HUN); L 12–15	Did not advance				

== Football ==
=== Men's tournament ===
Colombia men's football team qualified for the Olympics with a 2–1 victory over the United States at the second leg of the CONCACAF-CONMEBOL play-off, signifying the nation's Olympic comeback for the first time after 24 years.

Team roster

The following is the Colombia squad in the men's football tournament of the 2016 Summer Olympics. The team of 18 players was officially named on 14 July. Andrés Rentería withdrew due to injury and was replaced by Arley Rodríguez.

Head coach: Carlos Restrepo

No.	Pos.	Player	Date of birth (age)	Caps	Goals	Club
1	GK	Cristian Bonilla	2 June 1993 (aged 23)	4	0	(Colombian Football Federation) Atlético Nacional
2	DF	William Tesillo*	2 February 1990 (aged 26)	2	0	(Colombian Football Federation) Santa Fe
3	DF	Deivy Balanta	9 February 1993 (aged 23)	4	0	(Colombian Football Federation) Junior
4	DF	Deiver Machado	2 September 1993 (aged 22)	3	0	(Colombian Football Federation) Millonarios
5	DF	Felipe Aguilar	20 January 1993 (aged 23)	2	0	(Colombian Football Federation) Atlético Nacional
6	MF	Jefferson Lerma	25 October 1994 (aged 21)	2	0	(Royal Spanish Football Federation) Levante
7	FW	Arley Rodríguez	9 February 1993 (aged 23)	4	0	(Colombian Football Federation) Atlético Nacional
8	FW	Dorlan Pabón*	24 January 1988 (aged 28)	2	0	(Mexican Football Federation) Monterrey
9	FW	Miguel Borja	26 January 1993 (aged 23)	2	0	(Colombian Football Federation) Atlético Nacional
10	FW	Teófilo Gutiérrez* (c)	17 May 1985 (aged 31)	2	1	(Portuguese Football Federation) Sporting CP
11	FW	Harold Preciado	1 June 1994 (aged 22)	4	1	(Colombian Football Federation) Deportivo Cali
12	MF	Andrés Felipe Roa	25 May 1993 (aged 23)	4	0	(Colombian Football Federation) Deportivo Cali
13	DF	Helibelton Palacios	11 June 1993 (aged 23)	4	0	(Colombian Football Federation) Deportivo Cali
14	MF	Sebastián Pérez	29 March 1993 (aged 23)	3	0	(Colombian Football Federation) Atlético Nacional
15	MF	Wilmar Barrios	16 October 1993 (aged 22)	5	0	(Colombian Football Federation) Deportes Tolima
16	MF	Kevin Balanta	28 April 1997 (aged 19)	4	0	(Colombian Football Federation) Deportivo Cali
17	DF	Cristian Borja	18 February 1993 (aged 23)	7	0	(Colombian Football Federation) Santa Fe
18	GK	Luis Hurtado	24 January 1994 (aged 22)	2	0	(Colombian Football Federation) Deportivo Cali
19	DF	Juan Sebastián Quintero	23 March 1995 (aged 21)	0	0	(Colombian Football Federation) Deportivo Cali

* Over-aged player.

Group play

Pos	Team	Pld	W	D	L	GF	GA	GD	Pts	Qualification
1	Nigeria	3	2	0	1	6	6	0	6	Quarter-finals
2	Colombia	3	1	2	0	6	4	+2	5	Quarter-finals
3	Japan	3	1	1	1	7	7	0	4	
4	Sweden	3	0	1	2	2	4	−2	1	

Source: Rio2016 & FIFA
Rules for classification: Tiebreakers
4 August 2016
19:00 (18:00 UTC–4)

Sweden	2–2	Colombia
Ishak 43'; Ajdarević 62'	Report (Rio2016); Report (FIFA)	Gutiérrez 17'; Pabón 75' (pen.)

Arena da Amazônia, Manaus
Attendance: 29,996
Referee: Fahad Al-Mirdasi (Saudi Arabia)

7 August 2016
22:00 (21:00 UTC–4)

Japan	2–2	Colombia
Asano 67'; Nakajima 74'	Report (Rio2016); Report (FIFA)	Gutiérrez 59'; Fujiharu 65' (o.g.)

Arena da Amazônia, Manaus
Attendance: 26,603
Referee: Sergei Karasev (Russia)

10 August 2016
19:00

Colombia	2–0	Nigeria
Gutiérrez 4'; Pabón 63' (pen.)	Report (Rio2016); Report (FIFA)

Arena Corinthians, São Paulo
Attendance: 36,702
Referee: César Ramos (Mexico)

Quarterfinal

13 August 2016
22:00

Brazil	2–0	Colombia
Neymar 12'; Luan Vieira 83'	Report (Rio2016); Report (FIFA)

Arena Corinthians, São Paulo
Attendance: 41,560
Referee: Cüneyt Çakır (Turkey)

=== Women's tournament ===
Colombia women's football team qualified for the Olympics by finishing second behind Brazil at the 2014 Copa América Femenina in Ecuador.

Team roster

Head coach: Fabián Taborda

Colombia named a squad of 18 players and 4 alternates for the tournament, which was announced on 14 July 2016.

No.	Pos.	Player	Date of birth (age)	Caps	Goals	Club
1	GK	Catalina Pérez	8 November 1994 (aged 21)	5	0	(United States Soccer Federation) University of Miami
2	MF	Carolina Arbeláez	8 March 1995 (aged 21)	1	0	(Colombian Football Federation) Formas Íntimas
3	MF	Natalia Gaitán (captain)	3 April 1991 (aged 25)	39	4	(Royal Spanish Football Federation) Valencia CF
4	MF	Diana Ospina	3 March 1989 (aged 27)	33	3	(Colombian Football Federation) Formas Íntimas
5	DF	Isabella Echeverri	16 June 1994 (aged 22)	15	1	(United States Soccer Federation) University of Toledo
6	DF	Liana Salazar	16 September 1992 (aged 23)	13	0	(Colombian Football Federation) Futuro Soccer
7	FW	Ingrid Vidal	22 April 1991 (aged 25)	54	11	(Colombian Football Federation) CD Palmiranas
8	DF	Mildrey Pineda	1 October 1989 (aged 26)	25	2	(Colombian Football Federation) CD Palmiranas
9	DF	Oriánica Velásquez	1 August 1989 (aged 27)	41	2	(Colombian Football Federation) Club Gol Star
10	MF	Leicy Santos	16 May 1996 (aged 20)	15	2	(Colombian Football Federation) Club Gol Star
11	MF	Catalina Usme	25 December 1989 (aged 26)	44	20	(Colombian Football Federation) Formas Íntimas
12	FW	Nicole Regnier	28 February 1995 (aged 21)	1	0	(Royal Spanish Football Federation) Rayo Vallecano
13	DF	Ángela Clavijo	1 September 1993 (aged 22)	19	0	(Colombian Football Federation) Club Kamatsa
14	DF	Nataly Arias	2 April 1986 (aged 30)	58	6	(Colombian Football Federation) Formas Íntimas
15	MF	Tatiana Ariza	21 February 1991 (aged 25)	38	8	(United States Soccer Federation) Houston Aces
16	FW	Lady Andrade	10 January 1992 (aged 24)	45	9	(United States Soccer Federation) Western New York Flash
17	DF	Carolina Arias	2 September 1990 (aged 25)	42	0	(Colombian Football Federation) Orsomarso S.C.
18	GK	Sandra Sepúlveda	3 March 1988 (aged 28)	39	0	(Israel Football Association) F.C. Kiryat Gat

Group play

Pos	Team	Pld	W	D	L	GF	GA	GD	Pts	Qualification
1	United States	3	2	1	0	5	2	+3	7	Quarter-finals
2	France	3	2	0	1	7	1	+6	6	Quarter-finals
3	New Zealand	3	1	0	2	1	5	−4	3	
4	Colombia	3	0	1	2	2	7	−5	1	

Source: Rio2016 & FIFA
Rules for classification: Tiebreakers
3 August 2016
22:00

France	4–0	Colombia
C. Arias 2' (o.g.); Le Sommer 14'; Abily 42'; Majri 82'	Report (Rio2016); Report (FIFA)

Mineirão, Belo Horizonte
Attendance: 6,847
Referee: Ri Hyang-ok (North Korea)

6 August 2016
20:00

Colombia	0–1	New Zealand
	Report (Rio2016); Report (FIFA)	Hearn 31'

Mineirão, Belo Horizonte
Attendance: 8,505
Referee: Gladys Lengwe (Zambia)

9 August 2016
19:00 (18:00 UTC–4)

Colombia	2–2	United States
Usme 26', 90'	Report (Rio2016); Report (FIFA)	Dunn 41'; Pugh 59'

Arena da Amazônia, Manaus
Attendance: 30,557
Referee: Teodora Albon (Romania)

== Golf ==
Colombia has entered one golfer into the Olympic tournament. Mariajo Uribe (world no. 103) qualified directly among the top 60 eligible players for the women's event based on the IGF World Rankings as of 11 July 2016.

Athlete	Event	Round 1	Round 2	Round 3	Round 4	Total		
Athlete	Event	Score	Score	Score	Score	Score	Par	Rank
Mariajo Uribe	Women's	70	71	74	66	281	−3	=19

== Gymnastics ==
=== Artistic ===
Colombia has entered two artistic gymnasts into the Olympic competition. A Colombian male gymnast, whose name had yet to be determined, and Catalina Escobar had claimed their Olympic spots each in the men's and women's apparatus and all-around events, respectively, at the Olympic Test Event in Rio de Janeiro.

Men

Athlete	Event	Qualification								Final							
Athlete	Event	Apparatus						Total	Rank	Apparatus						Total	Rank
Athlete	Event	F	PH	R	V	PB	HB	Total	Rank	F	PH	R	V	PB	HB	Total	Rank
Jossimar Calvo	All-around	14.175	15.033	14.166	13.766	15.400	14.966	87.506	13 Q	14.650	14.700	14.433	14.833	15.366	14.933	88.915	10

Women

Athlete	Event	Qualification						Final					
Athlete	Event	Apparatus				Total	Rank	Apparatus				Total	Rank
Athlete	Event	F	V	UB	BB	Total	Rank	F	V	UB	BB	Total	Rank
Catalina Escobar	Uneven bars	—N/a	13.058	—N/a		13.058	61	Did not advance					
Catalina Escobar	Balance beam	—N/a		10.200	—N/a	10.200	82	Did not advance					
Catalina Escobar	Floor	—N/a			3.700	3.700	82	Did not advance					

== Judo ==
Colombia had qualified two judokas for each of the following weight classes at the 2016 Summer Olympics. Yuri Alvear, a three time Olympian by the 2012 London Summer Olympics earning a bronze medal, was ranked among the top 14 eligible judokas for women in the IJF World Ranking List of 30 May 2016. Olympian Yadinis Amaris in the women's lightweight (57 kg) earned a continental quota spot from the Pan American region, as the highest-ranked Colombian judoka outside of direct qualifying position.

Athlete	Event	Round of 32	Round of 16	Quarterfinals	Semifinals	Repechage	Final / BM	
Athlete	Event	Opposition Result	Opposition Result	Opposition Result	Opposition Result	Opposition Result	Opposition Result	Rank
Yadinis Amaris	Women's −57 kg	Gjakova (KOS); L 000–100	Did not advance					
Yuri Alvear	Women's −70 kg	Bye	Pérez (PUR); W 000–000 S	Bernabéu (ESP); W 100–000	Conway (GBR); W 010–000	Bye	Tachimoto (JPN); L 000–100	2nd place, silver medalist(s)

== Rugby sevens ==
=== Women's tournament ===
The Colombia women's team qualified automatically based on their top finish at the 2015 CONSUR Women's Sevens.

Team roster

- The following is the Colombia roster in the women's rugby sevens tournament of the 2016 Summer Olympics.

Head coach: Laurent Palau

Backs		Forwards
2	Nathalie Marchino	1	Nicole Acevedo
4	Khaterinne Medina	3	Alejandra Betancur (c)
6	Isabel Romero	5	Ana Ramírez
8	Solangie Delgado	7	Estefanía Ramírez
9	Camila Lopera	10	Guadalupe López
11	Sharon Acevedo
12	Laura González

Group play

Pos	Team	Pld	W	D	L	PF	PA	PD	Pts	Qualification
1	Australia	3	2	1	0	101	12	+89	8	Quarter-finals
2	Fiji	3	2	0	1	48	43	+5	7	Quarter-finals
3	United States	3	1	1	1	67	24	+43	6	Quarter-finals
4	Colombia	3	0	0	3	0	137	−137	3	

Source: World Rugby
Rules for classification: 1) Points; 2) Head-to-head result; 3) Point difference; 4) Points scored.

6 August 2016
13:30

Australia	53–0	Colombia
Try: Williams 1' m Caslick (3) 3' c, 7' m, 8' c Tonegato 5' m Parry 7' m Beck (2) 10' c, 13' c Turner 12' m Con: Dalton (3/8); Etheridge (1/1)	Report (Rio 2016); Report (World Rugby)

Deodoro Stadium, Rio de Janeiro
Referee: Jess Beard (New Zealand)

6 August 2016
18:00

United States	48–0	Colombia
Try: Kelter (2) 1' c, 6' c Doyle 6' m Johnson (2) 7' m, 13' m Javelet 8' c Carlyle 11' c Fa'avesi 14' m Con: Kelter (2/3); Baravilala (2/3); Stephens (0/2)	Report (Rio 2016); Report (World Rugby)

Deodoro Stadium, Rio de Janeiro
Referee: Beatrice Benvenuti (Italy)

7 August 2016
13:00

Fiji	36–0	Colombia
Try: Daveau (2) 1' c, 3' m Tinai 5' c Roqica 7' m Riwai 9' c Nagasau 14' m Con: Tinai (2/4); Riwai (1/1); Tisolo (0/1)	Report (Rio 2016); Report (World Rugby)

Deodoro Stadium, Rio de Janeiro
Referee: Rose Labreche (Canada)

Classification semifinal (9–12)

7 August 2016
16:00

Brazil	24–0	Colombia
Try: Ramalho 3' m Teles (2) 6' c, 7' m Muhlbauer 9' c Con: Kochhann (2/4)	Report (Rio 2016); Report (World Rugby)

Deodoro Stadium, Rio de Janeiro
Referee: Sakurako Kawasaki (Japan)

Eleventh place game

8 August 2016
12:30

Colombia	10–22	Kenya
Try: S. Acevedo 1' m Medina 7' m Con: Lopera (0/2)	Report (Rio 2016); Report (World Rugby)	Try: Okelo (2) 4' m, 11' c I. Otieno 9' m Masinde 14' m Con: Awino (1/3); Nziwa (0/1)

Deodoro Stadium, Rio de Janeiro
Referee: Rose Labreche (Canada)

== Sailing ==
Colombia has qualified a boat in the men's RS:X class by virtue of a top finish for Central & South America at the 2016 ISAF World Cup regatta in Miami, Florida, United States.

Athlete	Event	Race													Net points	Final rank
Athlete	Event	1	2	3	4	5	6	7	8	9	10	11	12	M*	Net points	Final rank
Santiago Grillo	Men's RS:X	29	24	24	32	~~DNF~~	24	28	23	14	29	35	DNF	EL	299	30

M = Medal race; EL = Eliminated – did not advance into the medal race

== Shooting ==
Colombia has received a wildcard invitation from ISSF to send Danilo Caro, who will be going to his sixth Olympics, in the men's trap, as long as the minimum qualifying score (MQS) was fulfilled by 31 March 2016.

Athlete	Event	Qualification		Semifinal		Final	
Athlete	Event	Points	Rank	Points	Rank	Points	Rank
Danilo Caro	Men's trap	110	27	Did not advance			

Qualification Legend: Q = Qualify for the next round; q = Qualify for the bronze medal (shotgun)

== Swimming ==
Colombian swimmers have so far achieved qualifying standards in the following events (up to a maximum of 2 swimmers in each event at the Olympic Qualifying Time (OQT), and potentially 1 at the Olympic Selection Time (OST)):

Athlete	Event	Heat		Semifinal		Final	
Athlete	Event	Time	Rank	Time	Rank	Time	Rank
Jonathan Gómez	Men's 200 m butterfly	1:56.65	15 Q	1:57.47	15	Did not advance	
Jorge Murillo	Men's 100 m breaststroke	59.93 NR	14 Q	1:00.81	16	Did not advance	
Jorge Murillo	Men's 200 m breaststroke	2:12.81	28	Did not advance			
Omar Pinzón	Men's 200 m backstroke	1:59.69	22	Did not advance			
Isabella Arcila	Women's 50 m freestyle	25.35	30	Did not advance			

== Synchronized swimming ==
Colombia has fielded a squad of two synchronized swimmers to compete only in the women's duet by virtue of their eleventh-place finish at the FINA Olympic test event in Rio de Janeiro.

Athlete	Event	Technical routine		Free routine (preliminary)			Free routine (final)		
Athlete	Event	Points	Rank	Points	Total (technical + free)	Rank	Points	Total (technical + free)	Rank
Estefanía Álvarez; Mónica Arango	Duet	80.3363	17	80.4667	160.8030	17	Did not advance		

== Table tennis ==
Colombia has entered one athlete into the table tennis competition at the Games. Lady Ruano secured the Olympic spot in the women's singles by virtue of her top six finish at the 2016 Latin American Qualification Tournament in Santiago, Chile.

Athlete	Event	Preliminary	Round 1	Round 2	Round 3	Round of 16	Quarterfinals	Semifinals	Final / BM	
Athlete	Event	Opposition Result	Opposition Result	Opposition Result	Opposition Result	Opposition Result	Opposition Result	Opposition Result	Opposition Result	Rank
Lady Ruano	Women's singles	Bye	Vacenovská (CZE); L 0–4	Did not advance						

== Taekwondo ==
Colombia entered two athletes into the taekwondo competition at the Olympics. 2012 Olympic bronze medalist Óscar Muñoz, and 2008 Olympian Doris Patiño secured the spots in the men's flyweight (58 kg) and women's lightweight category (57 kg) respectively by virtue of their top two finish at the 2016 Pan American Qualification Tournament in Aguascalientes, Mexico.

Athlete	Event	Round of 16	Quarterfinals	Semifinals	Repechage	Final / BM	
Athlete	Event	Opposition Result	Opposition Result	Opposition Result	Opposition Result	Opposition Result	Rank
Óscar Muñoz	Men's −58 kg	Bragança (POR); L 3–14	Did not advance				
Doris Patiño	Women's −57 kg	Malak (EGY); L 0–13 PTG	Did not advance				

== Tennis ==
Colombia has entered three tennis players into the Olympic tournament. Juan Sebastián Cabal and Robert Farah qualified directly for the men's doubles by virtue of their combined top 30 placement in the ATP World Rankings as of 6 June 2016. Meanwhile, Mariana Duque Mariño received a spare ITF Olympic place to compete in the women's singles, as the next highest-ranked eligible player, not yet qualified, in the WTA World Rankings, as a result of three players' withdrawal from the Games due to concerns on Zika virus.

Athlete	Event	Round of 64	Round of 32	Round of 16	Quarterfinals	Semifinals	Final / BM	
Athlete	Event	Opposition Result	Opposition Result	Opposition Result	Opposition Result	Opposition Result	Opposition Result	Rank
Juan Sebastián Cabal; Robert Farah	Men's doubles	—N/a	Herbert / Mahut (FRA); W 7–6^{(7–4)}, 6–3	Johnson / Sock (USA); L 4–6, 6–7^{(1–7)}	Did not advance			
Mariana Duque Mariño	Women's singles	Kerber (GER); L 3–6, 5–7	Did not advance					

== Weightlifting ==
Colombian weightlifters have qualified five men's and four women's quota places for the Rio Olympics based on their combined team standing by points at the 2014 and 2015 IWF World Championships. The team must allocate these places to individual athletes by 20 June 2016.

Men

Athlete	Event	Snatch		Clean & Jerk		Total	Rank
Athlete	Event	Result	Rank	Result	Rank	Total	Rank
Habib de las Salas	−56 kg	119	8	147	8	264	6
Óscar Figueroa	−62 kg	142	1	176	1	318	1st place, gold medalist(s)
Edwin Mosquera	−69 kg	140	16	170	16	310	16
Luis Javier Mosquera	−69 kg	145	5	183	3	338	(bronze) *
Andrés Caicedo	−77 kg	155	5	191	4	346	5

* Mosquera originally placed fourth behind initial bronze medalist Izzat Artykov of Kyrgyzstan. Artykov was later disqualified after testing positive for a banned substance called strychnine. The bronze medal stripped from Artykov is reallocated to Mosquera.

Women

Athlete	Event	Snatch		Clean & Jerk		Total	Rank
Athlete	Event	Result	Rank	Result	Rank	Total	Rank
Lina Rivas	−58 kg	96	8	120	7	216	7
Mercedes Pérez	−63 kg	104	5	130	4	234	4
Leydi Solís	−69 kg	110	4	143	3	253	4
Ubaldina Valoyes	−75 kg	111	5	136	4	247	4

== Wrestling ==
Colombia has qualified a total of five wrestlers for each of the following weight classes into the Olympic competition. Two of them had booked Olympic spots each in the women's freestyle (58 & 75 kg) at the 2015 World Championships, while the majority of Olympic berths were awarded to Colombian wrestlers, who progressed to the top two finals at the 2016 Pan American Qualification Tournament.

Key:

- VT – Victory by Fall.
- PP – Decision by Points – the loser with technical points.
- PO – Decision by Points – the loser without technical points.
- ST – Technical superiority – the loser without technical points and a margin of victory of at least 8 (Greco-Roman) or 10 (freestyle) points.

Men's freestyle

Athlete	Event	Qualification	Round of 16	Quarterfinal	Semifinal	Repechage 1	Repechage 2	Final / BM	
Athlete	Event	Opposition Result	Opposition Result	Opposition Result	Opposition Result	Opposition Result	Opposition Result	Opposition Result	Rank
Carlos Izquierdo	−74 kg	Bye	Hasanov (AZE); L 0–4 ^{ST}	Did not advance					18

Men's Greco-Roman

Athlete	Event	Qualification	Round of 16	Quarterfinal	Semifinal	Repechage 1	Repechage 2	Final / BM	
Athlete	Event	Opposition Result	Opposition Result	Opposition Result	Opposition Result	Opposition Result	Opposition Result	Opposition Result	Rank
Carlos Muñoz	−75 kg	Bácsi (HUN); L 0–4 ^{ST}	Did not advance						20

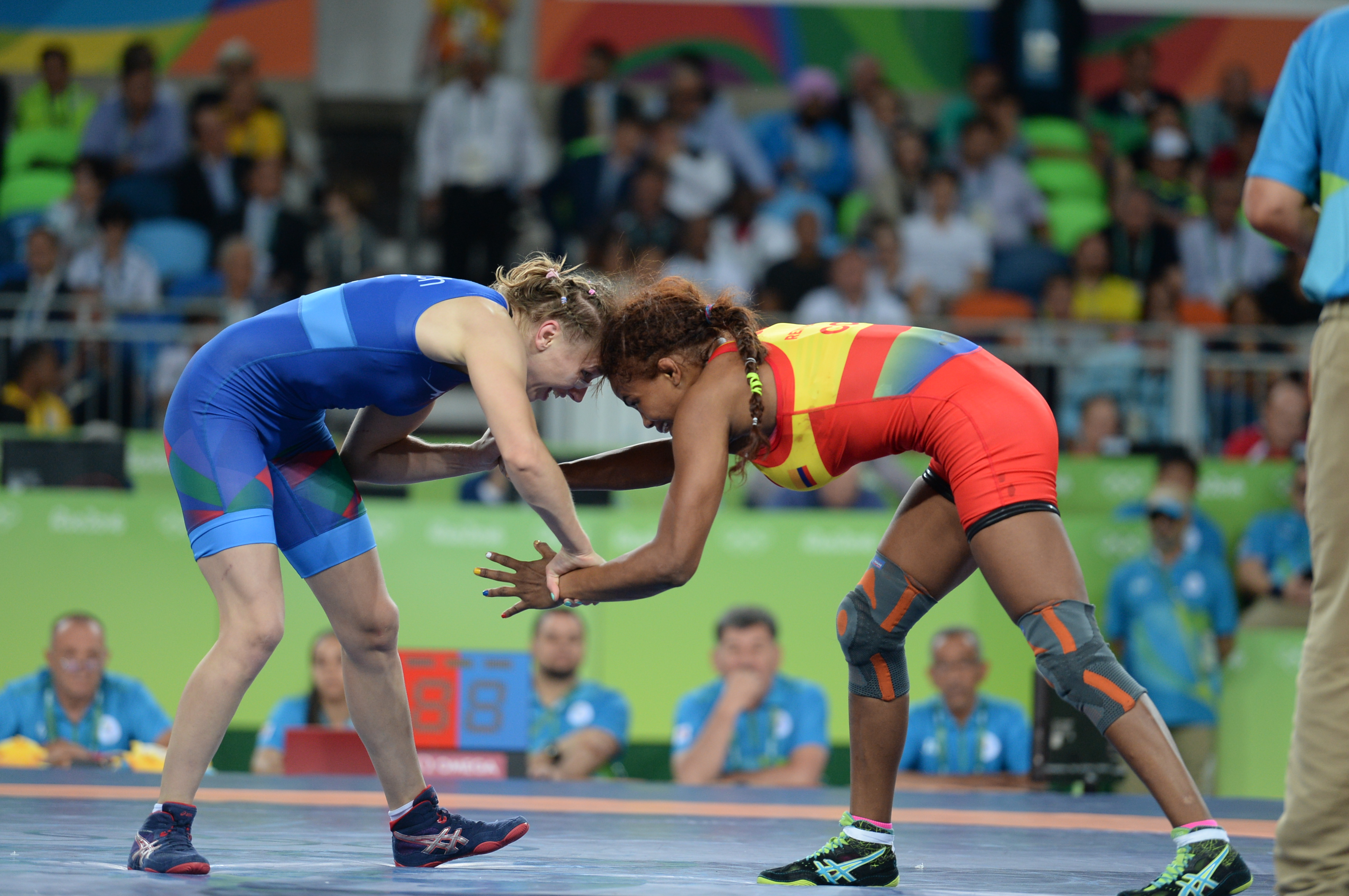
Wrestler Jackeline Rentería facing an opponent

Women's freestyle

Athlete	Event	Qualification	Round of 16	Quarterfinal	Semifinal	Repechage 1	Repechage 2	Final / BM	
Athlete	Event	Opposition Result	Opposition Result	Opposition Result	Opposition Result	Opposition Result	Opposition Result	Opposition Result	Rank
Carolina Castillo	−48 kg	Bye	Chov (CAM); W 4–0 ^{ST}	Yankova (BUL); L 1–3 ^{PP}	Did not advance				8
Jackeline Rentería	−58 kg	Bye	Sovero (PER); W 3–1 ^{PP}	Ratkevich (AZE); L 1–3 ^{PP}	Did not advance				8
Andrea Olaya	−75 kg	Bye	Gray (USA); L 0–5 ^{VT}	Did not advance					15

== See also ==
- Colombia at the 2015 Pan American Games
- Colombia at the 2016 Winter Youth Olympics
- Colombia at the 2016 Summer Paralympics
