= Rugby sevens at the 2014 Central American and Caribbean Games =

- Venue: Estadio Moderno
- Location: (Mexico) Veracruz
- Dates: 28–29 November

The rugby sevens competition at the 2014 Central American and Caribbean Games was held in Veracruz, Mexico.

The tournament was scheduled to be held from 28–29 November at the High Performance Center in Veracruz.

== Medal summary ==
Event	Gold	Silver	Bronze
Men’s tournament	Colombia (COL); Ferney Mejia; Camilo Cadavid; Sebastian Mejia; Pablo Lemoine; Brayan Campino; Oscar Forero; Carlos Vasquez; John Alvarez; Jose Manuel Diosa; Emmanuel Bedoya; Juan Gabriel Davila; Jhon Urrutia	Mexico (MEX); Pascal Nadaud; Luis Herrejon; Roberto Calderon; Alejandro Chavez; Miguel Carner; Christian Henning; Fharid Samano; Juan Pablo Teran; Gonzalo Pons; Carlos Susarrey; Miguel Teran; Luis Arredondo	Trinidad and Tobago (TRI); Christopher Hudson; Aasan Lewis; Shakir Flemming; James Phillip; Agboola Silverthorn; Darrel Scott; Joseph Quashie; David Gokool; Jesse Richards; Keishon Walker; Wayne Kelly; Rowell Gordon
Women’s tournament	Colombia (COL); Angela Lozano; Ruth Lozano; Claudia Betancur; Ana Camacho; Ana Ramirez; Nicole Acevedo; Isabel Romero; Cindy Delgado; Camila Lopera; Guadalupe Lopez; Laura Gonzalez; Sharon Acevedo	Venezuela (VEN); Carla Lanzarote; Daniela Gonzalez; Estefania Salami; Ana Fernandez; Maryoly Gamez; Maria Palencia; Claudia Contreras; Yudannys Eduardo; Ismar Suarez; Daniela Diaz; Jetsy Ferrera; Ingrid Griffin	Mexico (MEX); Michelle Farah; Gabriela Garcia; Claudia Rendon; Daniela Rosales; Nary Reyna; Andrea Rodriguez; Fernanda Carrillo; Martha Santiago; Bertha Fernandez; Dorian Avelar; Pualina Islas; Rosa Rivera

== Medal table ==
* Host nation (Mexico)

Rank	Nation	Gold	Silver	Bronze	Total
1	Colombia (COL)	2	0	0	2
2	Mexico (MEX)*	0	1	1	2
3	Venezuela (VEN)	0	1	0	1
4	Trinidad and Tobago (TRI)	0	0	1	1
Totals (4 entries)		2	2	2	6
