= María Paula Porras =

Costa Rican footballer (born 2002)

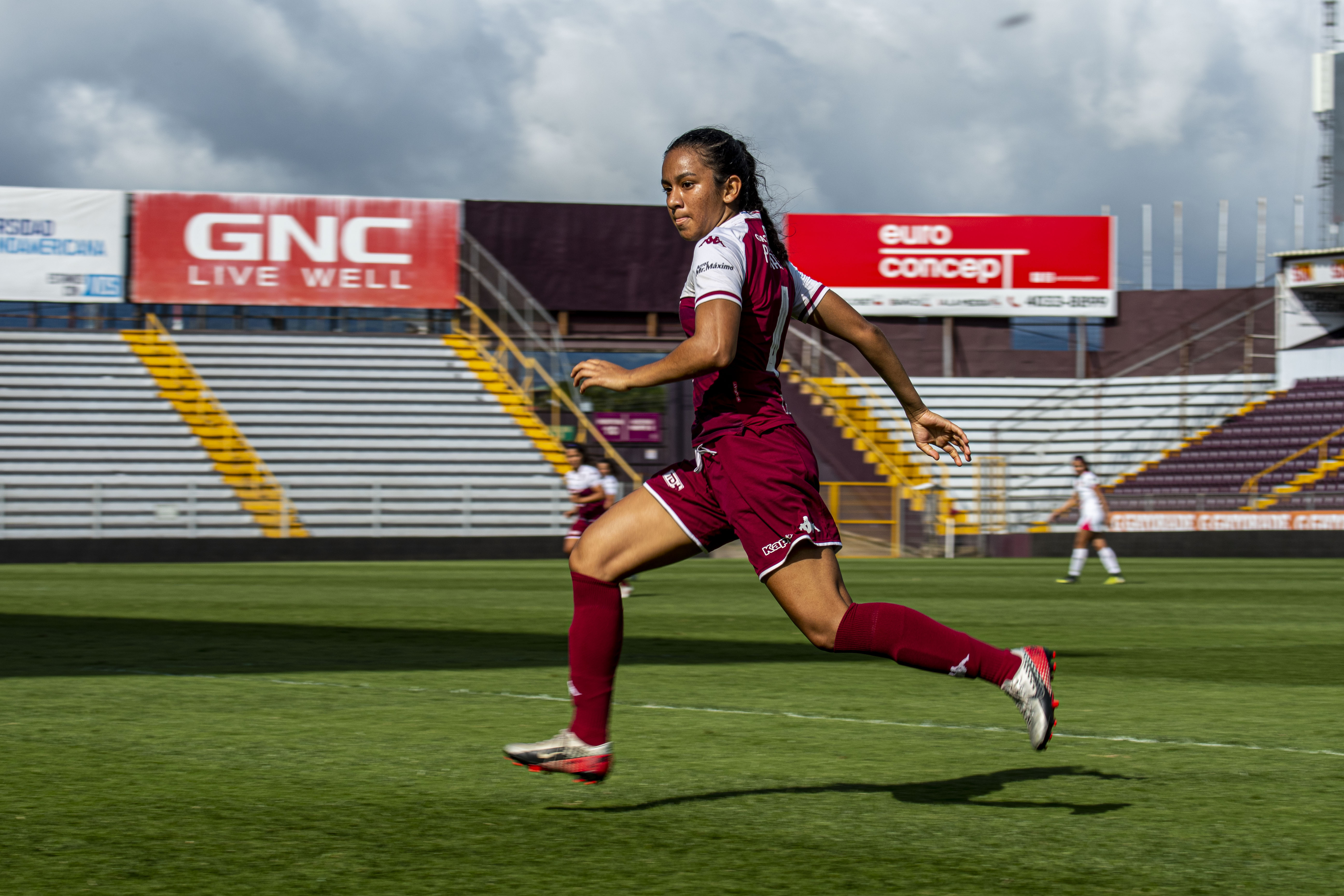
- Porras with Saprissa in 2019

Personal information
- Full name: María Paula Porras Morales
- Date of birth: 18 March 2002 (age 24)
- Height: 1.60 m (5 ft 3 in)
- Position: Forward

Team information
- Current team: Sporting San José

Senior career*
Years	Team	Apps	(Gls)
2017–2022	Saprissa		
2023–	Sporting San José		

International career^{‡}
2018	Costa Rica U17	1	(0)
2018–	Costa Rica	6	(1)
- * Club domestic league appearances and goals ‡ National team caps and goals as of 28 July 2019

María Paula Porras Morales (born 18 March 2002) is a Costa Rican footballer who plays as a forward for Sporting San José and the Costa Rica women's national team.

== International goals ==
Scores and results list Costa Rica's goal tally first

No.	Date	Venue	Opponent	Score	Result	Competition
1	27 July 2018	Estadio Moderno Julio Torres, Barranquilla, Colombia	Trinidad and Tobago	2–0	2–0	2018 Central American and Caribbean Games
