= Charlyn Corral =

Mexican footballer (born 1991)

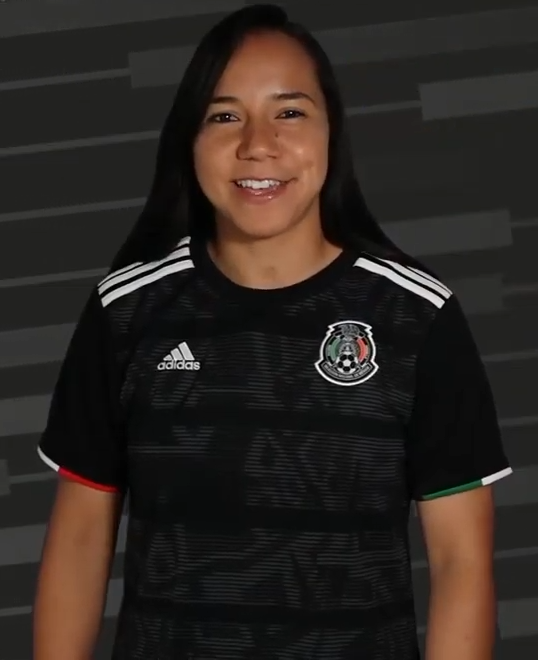
- Corral in 2019

Personal information
- Full name: Verónica Charlyn Corral Ang
- Date of birth: 11 September 1991 (age 35)
- Place of birth: Acolman, State of Mexico, Mexico
- Height: 1.52 m (5 ft 0 in)
- Position: Forward

Team information
- Current team: Pachuca
- Number: 9

Youth career
- –2011: Borregos Salvajes

College career
Years	Team	Apps	(Gls)
2012–2013	Louisville Cardinals	35	(21)

Senior career*
Years	Team	Apps	(Gls)
2014	Merilappi United	8	(5)
2015–2019	Levante	117	(86)
2019–2021	Atlético Madrid	20	(8)
2021–	Pachuca	198	(176)

International career
2008	Mexico U-17	5	(4)
2006–2010	Mexico U-20	24	(18)
2008–	Mexico	89	(53)
Medal record
Women's football
Representing Mexico
Pan American Games
Gold medal – first place	2023 Santiago	Team
Central American and Caribbean Games
Gold medal – first place	2023 San Salvador
- * Club domestic league appearances and goals

Verónica Charlyn Corral Ang (born 11 September 1991) is a Mexican footballer who plays as a striker for Liga MX Femenil club CF Pachuca and the Mexico women's national team. She has previously played for Atlético Madrid and Levante in Spain, for Merilappi United in Finland, and for the University of Louisville's college soccer team in the United States.

Charlyn won the prestigious Gerd Müller Trophy (an award recognizing the best forward/goalscorer of the year) at the 2026 Ballon d'Or gala, held on October 26, 2026, at the London Palladium.

== Club career ==
After scoring 23 goals for Levante in her debut 2015–16 season, Corral signed a one-year extension to her contract with the Spanish club. She had been named in the Primera División's Team of the Season. She left the side in 2019.

== International career ==
Corral made her debut for the Mexico U-21 team in 2006 at the age of 14. She was a member of the Mexico squad at the 2006, 2008 and 2010 FIFA U-20 Women's World Cup. In 2006, Corral was the top scorer at the CONCACAF Women's U-20 Championship. Corral earned her first cap for the Mexico women's national football team at the 2011 FIFA Women's World Cup in a group stage match against New Zealand.

On 19 June 2015, Corral was reported to have called for the replacement of Leonardo Cuéllar, long-time coach of the Mexico women's national team. Corral was not on the roster for the 2015 Pan American Games and the qualifying matches for the 2015 Women's World Cup. Cuellar stepped down as coach in 2016 and in 2017 Corral was again selected for the roster of the national team.

Corral was selected to represent Mexico at the 2023 Pan American Games held in Santiago, Chile, where the Mexican squad went undefeated to won the gold medal for the first time in their history at the Pan American Games, defeating Chile 1–0.

=== 2026 Ballon d'Or ===
Charlyn received the honor during the 2026 Ballon d'Or gala. The Pachuca player was awarded the Gerd Müller Trophy for scoring 49 goals in 49 matches played throughout the football season; the men's equivalent of the award went to English forward Harry Kane. With this achievement, Corral becomes the first Mexican in history to win this individual honor at the Ballon d'Or ceremony, which took place on October 26, 2026, at the London Palladium. In her acceptance speech, Corral dedicated the award to her teammates and highlighted her colleague Scarlett Camberos, who was also nominated for the women's Ballon d'Or and finished in 21st place.

== Personal life ==
Charlyn's brother George Corral is a former Mexican professional footballer who played as a defender.

== Career statistics ==
=== Club ===
Club	Season	Division	League		Cup		Continental		Others		Total	
Club	Season	Division	Apps	Goals	Apps	Goals	Apps	Goals	Apps	Goals	Apps	Goals
Louisville Cardinals	2012	NCAA	18	8							18	8
Louisville Cardinals	2013	NCAA	17	13							17	13
Louisville Cardinals	Total		35	21							35	21
Merilappi United	2014	Naisten Liiga	8	5							8	5
Levante	2015-16	Liga F	30	22	2	1					32	23
Levante	2016-17	Liga F	30	20	1	0					31	20
Levante	2017-18	Liga F	29	24	2	0					31	24
Levante	2018-19	Liga F	28	20	2	1					30	21
Levante	Total		117	86	7	2					124	88
Atlético Madrid	2019-2020	Liga F	20	8	2	1	4	1			26	10
Atlético Madrid	2020-2021	Liga F	1	0							1	0
Atlético Madrid	Total		21	8	2	1	4	1			27	10
Pachuca	2021-22	Liga MX Femenil	38	21							38	21
Pachuca	2022-23	Liga MX Femenil	42	33							42	33
Pachuca	2023-24	Liga MX Femenil	37	36							37	36
Pachuca	2024-25	Liga MX Femenil	45	46			3	2			48	48
Pachuca	2025-26	Liga MX Femenil	36	40			6	2			42	42
Pachuca	Total		198	176			9	2			207	178
Total career			379	296	9	3	13	4			401	304

=== International ===
Team	Years	Apps	Goals
Mexico	2006	1	0
Mexico	2007	7	2
Mexico	2008	1	0
Mexico	2009	0	0
Mexico	2010	0	0
Mexico	2011	8	1
Mexico	2012	0	0
Mexico	2013	0	0
Mexico	2014	9	10
Mexico	2015	16	7
Mexico	2016	0	0
Mexico	2017	6	3
Mexico	2018	12	7
Mexico	2019	8	5
Mexico	2020	0	0
Mexico	2021	0	0
Mexico	2022	0	0
Mexico	2023	7	4
Mexico	2024	2	1
Mexico	2025	8	7
Mexico	2026	4	6
Total		89	53

No.	Date	Venue	Opponent	Score	Result	Competition
1.	14 July 2007	Estádio Olímpico João Havelange, Rio de Janeiro, Brazil	Paraguay	3–0	5–0	2007 Pan American Games
2.	14 July 2007	Estádio Olímpico João Havelange, Rio de Janeiro, Brazil	Paraguay	5–0	5–0	2007 Pan American Games
3.	7 March 2011	Sotira, Cyprus	Northern Ireland	2–0	3–1	2011 Cyprus Women's Cup
4.	21 October 2014	RFK Stadium, Washington, D.C., United States	Jamaica	2–1	3–1	2014 CONCACAF Women's Championship
5.	21 October 2014	RFK Stadium, Washington, D.C., United States	Jamaica	3–1	3–1	2014 CONCACAF Women's Championship
6.	26 October 2014	PPL Park, Chester, United States	Trinidad and Tobago	3–2	4–2 (a.e.t.)	2014 CONCACAF Women's Championship
7.	26 October 2014	PPL Park, Chester, United States	Trinidad and Tobago	4–2	4–2 (a.e.t.)	2014 CONCACAF Women's Championship
8.	17 November 2014	Estadio Unidad Deportiva Hugo Sánchez, Veracruz, Mexico	Colombia	1–1	1–1	2014 Central American and Caribbean Games
9.	19 November 2014	Estadio Unidad Deportiva Hugo Sánchez, Veracruz, Mexico	Trinidad and Tobago	1–0	6–0	2014 Central American and Caribbean Games
10.	19 November 2014	Estadio Unidad Deportiva Hugo Sánchez, Veracruz, Mexico	Trinidad and Tobago	3–0	6–0	2014 Central American and Caribbean Games
11.	19 November 2014	Estadio Unidad Deportiva Hugo Sánchez, Veracruz, Mexico	Trinidad and Tobago	5–0	6–0	2014 Central American and Caribbean Games
12.	19 November 2014	Estadio Unidad Deportiva Hugo Sánchez, Veracruz, Mexico	Trinidad and Tobago	6–0	6–0	2014 Central American and Caribbean Games
13.	27 November 2014	Estadio Unidad Deportiva Hugo Sánchez, Veracruz, Mexico	Colombia	1–0	2–0	2014 Central American and Caribbean Games
14.	13 January 2015	Shenzhen Stadium, Foshan, China	Canada	1–1	1–2	2015 Four Nations Tournament
15.	15 January 2015	Shenzhen Stadium, Foshan, China	South Korea	1–1	1–2	2015 Four Nations Tournament
16.	4 March 2015	Paralimni Stadium, Paralimni, Cyprus	South Africa	1–0	2–0	2015 Cyprus Women's Cup
17.	11 March 2015	GSZ Stadium, Larnaca, Cyprus	Italy	1–0	3–2	2015 Cyprus Women's Cup
18.	28 February 2018	Alanya, Turkey	Latvia	1–0	5–0	2018 Turkish Women's Cup
19.	28 February 2018	Alanya, Turkey	Latvia	3–0	5–0	2018 Turkish Women's Cup
20.	2 March 2018	Alanya, Turkey	Jordan	3–1	5–1	2018 Turkish Women's Cup
21.	20 July 2018	Estadio Moderno Julio Torres, Barranquilla, Colombia	Trinidad and Tobago	3–0	5–1	2018 Central American and Caribbean Games
22.	24 July 2018	Estadio Moderno Julio Torres, Barranquilla, Colombia	Nicaragua	3–0	4–0	2018 Central American and Caribbean Games
23.	30 July 2018	Estadio Moderno Julio Torres, Barranquilla, Colombia	Costa Rica	1–1	3–1	2018 Central American and Caribbean Games
24.	7 October 2018	WakeMed Soccer Park, Cary, United States	Trinidad and Tobago	1–0	4–1	2018 CONCACAF Women's Championship
25.	7 October 2018	WakeMed Soccer Park, Cary, United States	Trinidad and Tobago	3–1	4–1	2018 CONCACAF Women's Championship
26.	1 March 2019	GSZ Stadium, Larnaca, Cyprus	Thailand	1–0	2–1	2019 Cyprus Women's Cup
27.	1 March 2019	GSZ Stadium, Larnaca, Cyprus	Thailand	2–1	2–1	2019 Cyprus Women's Cup
28.	4 March 2019	AEK Arena, Larnaca, Cyprus	Hungary	1–1	3–3	2019 Cyprus Women's Cup
29.	28 July 2019	Estadio Universidad San Marcos, Lima, Peru	Jamaica	2–0	2–0	2019 Pan American Games
30.	3 August 2019	Estadio Universidad San Marcos, Lima, Peru	Colombia	2–2	2–2	2019 Pan American Games
31.	3 July 2023	Estadio Las Delicias, Santa Tecla, El Salvador	Jamaica	2–0	7–3	2023 Central American and Caribbean Games
32.	5 July 2023	Estadio Las Delicias, Santa Tecla, El Salvador	Guatemala	6–0	6–0	2023 Central American and Caribbean Games
33.	22 September 2023	Estadio Hidalgo, Pachuca, Mexico	Trinidad and Tobago	5–0	6–0	2024 CONCACAF W Gold Cup qualification
34.	22 October 2023	Estadio Elías Figueroa Brander, Valparaíso, Chile	Jamaica	7–0	7–0	2023 Pan American Games
35.	29 November 2025	Arnos Vale Stadium, Kingstown, Saint Vincent and the Grenadines	Saint Vincent and the Grenadines	1–0	14–0	2026 CONCACAF W Championship qualification
36.	29 November 2025	Arnos Vale Stadium, Kingstown, Saint Vincent and the Grenadines	Saint Vincent and the Grenadines	3–0	14–0	2026 CONCACAF W Championship qualification
37.	29 November 2025	Arnos Vale Stadium, Kingstown, Saint Vincent and the Grenadines	Saint Vincent and the Grenadines	5–0	14–0	2026 CONCACAF W Championship qualification
38.	29 November 2025	Arnos Vale Stadium, Kingstown, Saint Vincent and the Grenadines	Saint Vincent and the Grenadines	8–0	14–0	2026 CONCACAF W Championship qualification
39.	29 November 2025	Arnos Vale Stadium, Kingstown, Saint Vincent and the Grenadines	Saint Vincent and the Grenadines	12–0	14–0	2026 CONCACAF W Championship qualification
40.	29 November 2025	Arnos Vale Stadium, Kingstown, Saint Vincent and the Grenadines	Saint Vincent and the Grenadines	13–0	14–0	2026 CONCACAF W Championship qualification
41.	29 November 2025	Arnos Vale Stadium, Kingstown, Saint Vincent and the Grenadines	Saint Vincent and the Grenadines	14–0	14–0	2026 CONCACAF W Championship qualification
42.	2 March 2026	Daren Sammy Cricket Ground, Gros Islet, Saint Lucia	Saint Lucia	2–0	7–0	2026 CONCACAF W Championship qualification
43.	2 March 2026	Daren Sammy Cricket Ground, Gros Islet, Saint Lucia	Saint Lucia	4–0	7–0	2026 CONCACAF W Championship qualification
44.	10 April 2026	Estadio Carlos Vega Villalba, Zacatecas, Mexico	U.S. Virgin Islands	2–0	9–0	2026 CONCACAF W Championship qualification
45.	10 April 2026	Estadio Carlos Vega Villalba, Zacatecas, Mexico	U.S. Virgin Islands	4–0	9–0	2026 CONCACAF W Championship qualification
46.	18 April 2026	Estadio Nemesio Díez, Toluca, Mexico	Puerto Rico	5–0	6–0	2026 CONCACAF W Championship qualification
47.	18 April 2026	Estadio Nemesio Díez, Toluca, Mexico	Puerto Rico	6–0	6–0	2026 CONCACAF W Championship qualification
48.	9 October 2026	Estadio Victoria, Aguascalientes, Mexico	Jamaica	3–4	3–4	Friendly

== Honours ==
=== Club ===
Pachuca

- Liga Femenil: Clausura 2025
- Campeón de Campeonas: 2024–25

Atlético Madrid

- Supercopa de España Femenina: 2020–21

=== International ===
Mexico

- Pan American Games: 2023
- Central American and Caribbean Games: 2014, 2018, 2023

=== Individual ===
- Gerd Müller Trophy: 2026
- Liga F Top Scorer: 2017–18
- Liga MX Femenil Golden Boot: Clausura 2023, Clausura 2024, Apertura 2024, Clausura 2025, Apertura 2025
- Liga MX Femenil Best Player: 2022–23, 2023–24, 2024–25
- IFFHS World's Best Women's Goal Scorer: 2024, 2025
- IFFHS World's Best Women's National Goal Scorer: 2023, 2024, 2025
- National Sports Award: 2024
