= Marcela Restrepo =

Colombian footballer (born 1995)

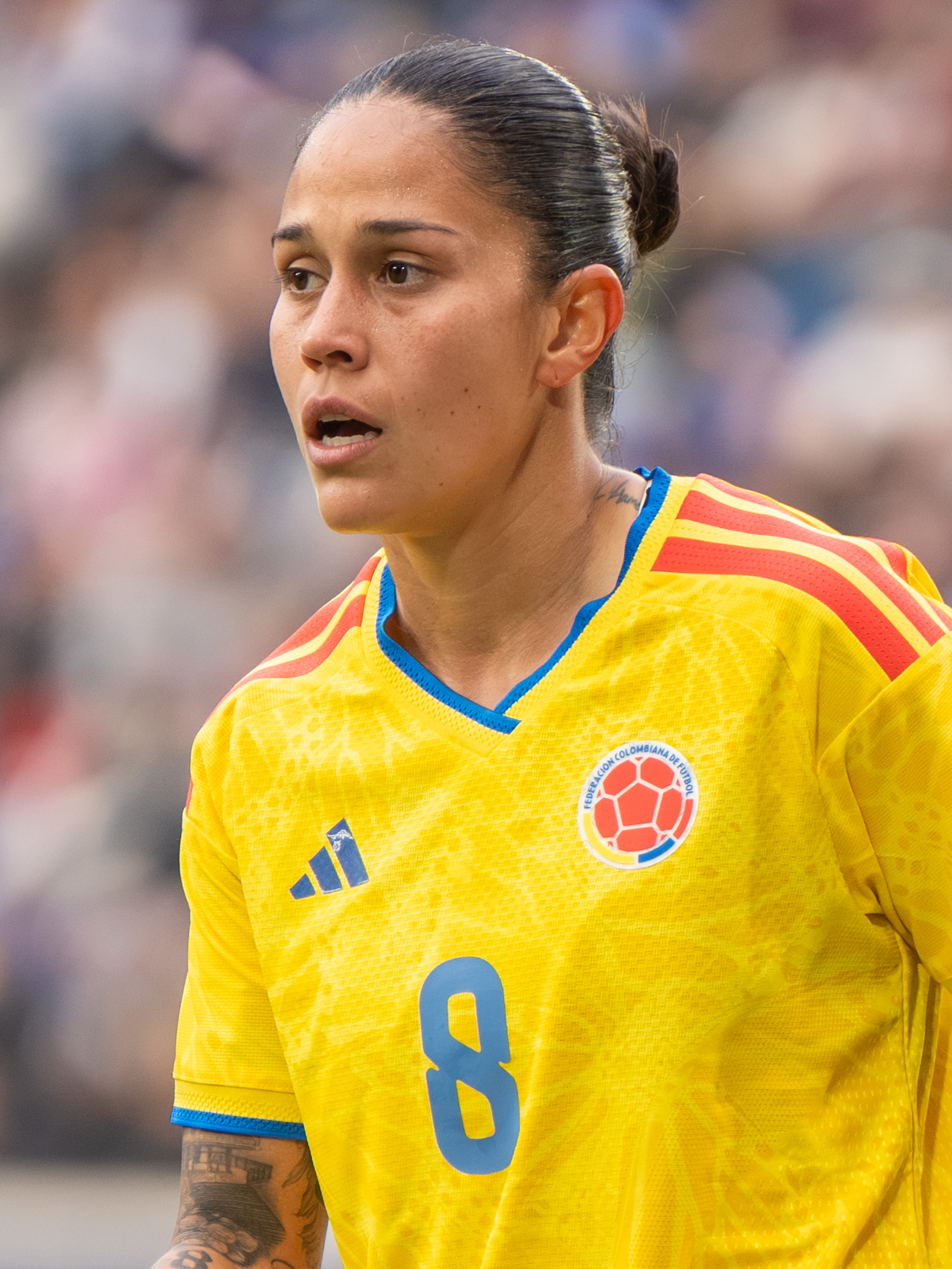
- Restrepo with Colombia in 2026

Personal information
- Full name: Marcela Restrepo Valencia
- Date of birth: 10 November 1995 (age 31)
- Place of birth: Dosquebradas, Colombia
- Height: 1.69 m (5 ft 7 in)
- Position: Midfielder

Team information
- Current team: Monterrey
- Number: 24

Senior career*
Years	Team	Apps	(Gls)
2014	Vitória	8	(2)
2015–2016	Generaciones Palmiranas		
2017–2018	Cortuluá		
2019	Atlético Huila		
2020–2021	Collerense	24	(1)
2021–2022	Sporting de Gijón	29	(9)
2022–2023	Logroño	0	(0)
2023–2024	Atlético Nacional	20	(10)
2024–	Monterrey	32	(2)

International career^{‡}
2012	Colombia U17	3	(0)
2018–	Colombia	11	(2)
Medal record
Women's football
Representing Colombia
CONMEBOL Women's Nations League
Gold medal – first place	2025–26
Copa América Femenina
Silver medal – second place	2025 Ecuador
Pan American Games
Gold medal – first place	2019 Lima	Team
Central American and Caribbean Games
Silver medal – second place	2018 Barranquilla	Team
- * Club domestic league appearances and goals as of 1 February 2026 ‡ National team caps and goals as of 19 July 2023

Marcela Restrepo Valencia (born 10 November 1995) is a Colombian professional footballer who plays as a midfielder for Liga MX Femenil club Monterrey and the Colombia national team.

A futsal player until her mid-teens, Restrepo began her eleven-a-side career in Brazil before spells with three Colombian clubs and three seasons in Spain with Collerense, Sporting de Gijón and Logroño. Returning to Colombia with Atlético Nacional, she was the top scorer in the 2024 Liga Femenina BetPlay, and she joined Monterrey later that year, winning the Apertura 2024 in her first tournament with the club.

Restrepo won a gold medal at the 2019 Pan American Games and has played at the 2023 FIFA Women's World Cup, the 2024 Olympic tournament — where she scored in Colombia's first Olympic victory — and the 2025 Copa América Femenina, finishing as a runner-up. She scored again in the match that decided the 2025–26 CONMEBOL Women's Nations League, which Colombia won.

== Early life ==
Restrepo was born on 10 November 1995 in Dosquebradas, in the department of Risaralda. She started playing futsal at seven, initially as a goalkeeper, in school competitions. Her mother opposed the idea that football was a game for women, and according to Restrepo's cousin Manuela Sánchez would remove her from the pitch by her hair.

At 15 she moved to Cali with her sister to pursue futsal at a higher level, where she came to the attention of scouts. She converted to the eleven-a-side game only afterwards, taking up the midfield role she has played since.

== Club career ==
=== Vitória das Tabocas ===
Restrepo began her eleven-a-side career abroad, spending 2014 in Brazil with Vitória das Tabocas of Vitória de Santo Antão, Pernambuco. She made eight appearances and scored twice.

=== Generaciones Palmiranas ===
She returned to Colombia in 2015 to join Generaciones Palmiranas of Palmira, remaining with the club for two years before the launch of a national women's league.

=== Cortuluá ===
Restrepo joined Cortuluá of Tuluá in 2017, the inaugural season of the Colombian Women's Football League, and stayed for two seasons.

=== Atlético Huila ===
In 2019 she signed for Atlético Huila of Neiva, who months earlier had become the first Colombian club to win the Copa Libertadores Femenina. It was while at Huila that she won gold with Colombia at the 2019 Pan American Games.

=== Collerense ===
On 24 July 2020 Restrepo signed for Collerense of Palma, her first move to Europe. The club announced her as a creative central midfielder for its Reto Iberdrola campaign, then the second tier of Spanish women's football.

=== Sporting de Gijón ===
Restrepo joined Real Sporting de Gijón on 7 September 2021. Her single season in Asturias was the most productive of her club career to that point, with nine goals in 29 appearances.

=== Logroño ===
She moved to Logroño of La Rioja for 2022–23 but made no league appearances, although Monterrey later recorded her as having featured for the club in the Copa de la Reina. She remained a fixture in the Colombia squad throughout, and was with the national team in Bogotá in June 2023 preparing for the 2023 FIFA Women's World Cup.

=== Atlético Nacional ===
Restrepo returned to Colombia in 2023, joining Atlético Nacional from Logroño. Played in a more advanced role, she had the best scoring season of her career in the 2024 Liga Femenina BetPlay, finishing as the competition's leading scorer with ten goals in twenty matches. She and Estefanía González both ended the season on ten, the Golden Boot going to Restrepo under the competition rules' tiebreaker for fewer matches played.

On matchday nine she scored a hat-trick — a first-half penalty, a second-half goal and a third in the 85th minute — in a 4–0 win over Millonarios at the Estadio Atanasio Girardot, as Nacional extended an unbeaten run to six wins and two draws. Nacional went through the group stage undefeated but were eliminated in the playoff round, and Restrepo left the club on 18 August 2024.

=== Monterrey ===
Restrepo signed a one-year contract with Liga MX Femenil club Monterrey on 24 August 2024, taking the number 24 shirt. Monterrey won the Apertura 2024 that November, beating Tigres on penalties after a 3–3 draw at the Estadio BBVA in front of more than 50,000 spectators — a fourth title for the club and a second in succession. They were eliminated from the 2024–25 CONCACAF W Champions Cup by the Washington Spirit.

On 17 August 2026 Restrepo scored directly from a corner in the 32nd minute of a 4–1 away win over Santos Laguna.

== International career ==
Restrepo represented Colombia at the 2012 FIFA U-17 Women's World Cup. She was named in the senior squad for the 2018 Copa América Femenina and scored against Venezuela at the 2018 Central American and Caribbean Games in Barranquilla, where Colombia took the silver medal. The following year she was part of the squad that won gold at the 2019 Pan American Games, beating Argentina 7–6 on penalties after a 1–1 draw in the final at the Estadio Universidad San Marcos in Lima on 9 August 2019.

At 27 she was selected for the 2023 FIFA Women's World Cup, appearing briefly against South Korea and Germany. She was also called up for the 2024 CONCACAF W Gold Cup.

Restrepo played in all four of Colombia's matches at the 2024 Olympic tournament, including the quarter-final against Spain. On 28 July 2024 she opened the scoring in the 29th minute against New Zealand, a 2–0 win that was Colombia's first at an Olympic tournament.

She was a runner-up at the 2025 Copa América Femenina and was recalled for the closing rounds of the 2025–26 CONMEBOL Women's Nations League. Restrepo started the decisive final-round fixture away to Paraguay on 9 June 2026 and equalised in the 43rd minute with Colombia 2–1 behind; they went on to win 4–3 at the Estadio Defensores del Chaco, taking the inaugural title and qualifying for the 2027 FIFA Women's World Cup.

=== International goals ===
Scores and results list Colombia's goal tally first; the score column indicates the score after each Restrepo goal.

No.	Date	Venue	Opponent	Score	Result	Competition
1	21 July 2018	Estadio Moderno Julio Torres, Barranquilla, Colombia	Venezuela	3–0	3–2	2018 Central American and Caribbean Games
2	19 May 2019	Estadio Nacional Julio Martínez Prádanos, Santiago, Chile	Chile	1–1	1–1	Friendly
3	28 July 2024	Stade de Lyon, Décines-Charpieu, France	New Zealand	1–0	2–0	2024 Summer Olympics
4	9 June 2026	Estadio Defensores del Chaco, Asunción, Paraguay	Paraguay	2–2	4–3	2025–26 CONMEBOL Women's Nations League

== Honours ==
Monterrey

- Liga MX Femenil: Apertura 2024

Colombia

- CONMEBOL Women's Nations League: 2025–26
- Copa América Femenina runner-up: 2025
- Pan American Games gold medal: 2019
- Central American and Caribbean Games silver medal: 2018

Individual

- Liga Femenina BetPlay top scorer: 2024
