= Rugby sevens at the 2018 Central American and Caribbean Games – Men's tournament =

2018 Central American and Caribbean Games men's rugby sevens tournament
Tournament details
- Host: Colombia
- Venue: Estadio Moderno
- Date: 1–2 August 2018
- Teams: 8

Final positions
- Champions: Colombia
- Runner-up: Mexico
- Third place: Jamaica
- Fourth place: Trinidad and Tobago

Tournament statistics
- Matches played: 24

The men's rugby sevens tournament at the 2018 Central American and Caribbean Games was held in Colombia. It was hosted at the Estadio Moderno in Barranquilla. The tournament was held from 1 August to 2 August 2018, starting with group matches before finishing with the medal ceremony on 2 August. The 2018 Games marked the second time that rugby sevens has been played at the Central American and Caribbean Games.

== Qualified teams ==
- Colombia
- Costa Rica
- Guatemala
- Guyana
- Jamaica
- Mexico
- Trinidad and Tobago
- Venezuela

== Competition schedule ==
The men's rugby tournament takes place over two days:

Date	Event
August 1	Preliminaries
August 2	Quarterfinals; Semifinals; Finals

== Pool stage ==
In pool play, each team plays one match against the other three teams in the group. Three points are awarded for a win, two points - for a draw, and one point - for a loss.

=== Pool A ===
Pos	Team	Pld	W	D	L	PF	PA	PD	Pts	Qualification
1	Colombia	3	2	0	1	72	31	+41	7	Quarter-finals
2	Mexico	3	2	0	1	57	29	+28	7	Quarter-finals
3	Guyana	3	2	0	1	46	33	+13	7	Quarter-finals
4	Costa Rica	3	0	0	3	12	94	−82	3	Quarter-finals

Rules for classification: 1) Points; 2) Head-to-head result; 3) Point difference; 4) Points scored.

1 August 2018
14:06

Colombia	19–12	Mexico
Try: Vanegas 7' c Garcia (2) 10' m, 11' c Con: Diosa Gomez (2/3)	Report (Barranquilla 2018)	Try: Ripoll 9' c Martinez-Elhore 15' m Con: Chavez (1/1); Rodriguez (0/1)

Estadio Moderno, Barranquilla
Referee: Santiago Romero Beloso (Uruguay)

1 August 2018
14:28

Guyana	22–7	Costa Rica
	Report

Estadio Moderno Julio Torres, Barranquilla

1 August 2018
16:56

Colombia	41–5	Costa Rica
	Report

Estadio Moderno Julio Torres, Barranquilla

1 August 2018
17:18

Guyana	10–14	Mexico
	Report

Estadio Moderno Julio Torres, Barranquilla

1 August 2018
19:36

Mexico	31–0	Costa Rica
	Report

Estadio Moderno Julio Torres, Barranquilla

1 August 2018
19:58

Colombia	12–14	Guyana
	Report

Estadio Moderno Julio Torres, Barranquilla

=== Pool B ===
Pos	Team	Pld	W	D	L	PF	PA	PD	Pts	Qualification
1	Trinidad and Tobago	3	3	0	0	60	22	+38	9	Quarter-finals
2	Jamaica	3	2	0	1	65	29	+36	7	Quarter-finals
3	Venezuela	3	1	0	2	34	58	−24	5	Quarter-finals
4	Guatemala	3	0	0	3	22	72	−50	3	Quarter-finals

Rules for classification: 1) Points; 2) Head-to-head result; 3) Point difference; 4) Points scored.

1 August 2018
14:50

Venezuela	10–24	Trinidad and Tobago
	Results

Estadio Moderno Julio Torres, Barranquilla

1 August 2018
15:12

Jamaica	29–12	Guatemala
	Results

Estadio Moderno Julio Torres

1 August 2018
17:40

Venezuela	24–5	Guatemala
	Results

Estadio Moderno Julio Torres

1 August 2018
18:02

Jamaica	7–17	Guyana
	Results

Estadio Moderno Julio Torres

1 August 2018
20:20

Trinidad and Tobago	19–5	Guatemala
	Results

Estadio Moderno Julio Torres

1 August 2018
20:42

Venezuela	0–29	Jamaica
	Results

Estadio Moderno Julio Torres

== Knockout stage ==
The knockout stages were scheduled for August 2.

=== 5–8th place playoff ===
Semi-finals
2 August 2018 – Estadio Moderno
Guatemala	7
Guyana	24
2 August 2018 – Estadio Moderno
Venezuela	29
Costa Rica	10

5th-place final
2 August 2018 – Estadio Moderno
Guyana	7
Venezuela	28
7th Place
2 August 2018 – Estadio Moderno
Guatemala	10
Costa Rica	12

==== Semi-finals ====
2 August 2018
16:56

Guatemala	7–24	Guyana
	Report

Estadio Moderno Julio Torres, Barranquilla

2 August 2018
17:18

Costa Rica	10–29	Venezuela
	Report

Estadio Moderno Julio Torres, Barranquilla

==== Seventh place ====
2 August 2018
19:02

Guatemala	10–12	Costa Rica
	Report

Estadio Moderno Julio Torres, Barranquilla

==== Fifth-place final ====
2 August 2018
19:24

Guyana	7–28	Venezuela
	Report

Estadio Moderno Julio Torres, Barranquilla

=== Medal Playoff ===
Quarter-finals
2 August 2018 – Estadio Moderno
Colombia	24
Guatemala	0
2 August 2018 – Estadio Moderno
Jamaica	15
Guyana	10
2 August 2018 – Estadio Moderno
Mexico	31
Venezuela	0
2 August 2018 – Estadio Moderno
Trinidad and Tobago	20
Costa Rica	5

Semi-finals
2 August 2018 – Estadio Moderno
Colombia	26
Jamaica	0
2 August 2018 – Estadio Moderno
Mexico	29
Trinidad and Tobago	5

Gold-medal match
2 August 2018 – Estadio Moderno
Colombia	21
Mexico	14
Bronze-medal match
2 August 2018 – Estadio Moderno
Jamaica	26
Trinidad and Tobago	5

==== Quarter-finals ====
2 August 2018
14:10

Colombia	24–0	Guatemala
	Report

Estadio Moderno Julio Torres, Barranquilla

2 August 2018
14:32

Jamaica	15–10	Guyana
	Report

Estadio Moderno Julio Torres, Barranquilla

2 August 2018
14:54

Mexico	31–0	Venezuela
	Report

Estadio Moderno Julio Torres, Barranquilla

2 August 2018
15:16

Trinidad and Tobago	20–5	Costa Rica
	Report

Estadio Moderno Julio Torres, Barranquilla

==== Semi-finals ====
2 August 2018
17:40

Colombia	26–0	Jamaica
	Report

Estadio Moderno Julio Torres, Barranquilla

2 August 2018
18:02

Mexico	29–5	Trinidad and Tobago
	Report

Estadio Moderno Julio Torres, Barranquilla

==== Bronze-medal match ====
2 August 2018
20:08

Jamaica	26–5	Trinidad and Tobago
	Report

Estadio Moderno Julio Torres, Barranquilla

==== Gold-medal match ====
2 August 2018
20:52

Colombia	21–14	Mexico
	Report

Estadio Moderno Julio Torres, Barranquilla

== Final ranking ==
Rank	Team	Matches	Points	Avg points	Tries	Avg tries
1st place, gold medalist(s)	Colombia	6	143	23.83	23	3.83
2nd place, silver medalist(s)	Mexico	6	131	21.83	21	3.50
3rd place, bronze medalist(s)	Jamaica	6	106	17.67	18	3.00
4	Trinidad and Tobago	6	90	15.00	16	2.67
5	Venezuela	6	91	15.17	15	2.50
6	Guyana	6	87	14.50	15	2.50
7	Costa Rica	6	39	6.50	7	1.17
8	Guatemala	6	39	6.50	7	1.17
