= Lara González =

Lara or Laura González may refer to:

- Lara González (rhythmic gymnast) (born 1986), Spanish Olympic rhythmic gymnast
- Laura González (rugby union) (born 1993), Colombian rugby sevens player
- Laura González (Miss Colombia) (born 1995), Colombian model and actress

== See also ==
- Lara González Ortega (born 1992), Spanish handball player
- Lara Gonzalez (School Rumble), a character in School Rumble
