= Rugby sevens at the 2018 Central American and Caribbean Games =

- Venue: Estadio Moderno
- Location: (Colombia) Barranquilla
- Dates: 1–2 August

The rugby sevens competition at the 2018 Central American and Caribbean Games was held in Barranquilla, Colombia from 1 to 2 August at the Estadio Moderno.

== Men's competition ==
=== Group stage ===
==== Pool A ====
Pos	Team	Pld	W	D	L	PF	PA	PD	Pts	Qualification
1	Colombia	3	2	0	1	72	31	+41	7	Quarter-finals
2	Mexico	3	2	0	1	57	29	+28	7	Quarter-finals
3	Guyana	3	2	0	1	46	33	+13	7	Quarter-finals
4	Costa Rica	3	0	0	3	12	94	−82	3	Quarter-finals

Rules for classification: 1) Points; 2) Head-to-head result; 3) Point difference; 4) Points scored.

==== Pool B ====
Pos	Team	Pld	W	D	L	PF	PA	PD	Pts	Qualification
1	Trinidad and Tobago	3	3	0	0	60	22	+38	9	Quarter-finals
2	Jamaica	3	2	0	1	65	29	+36	7	Quarter-finals
3	Venezuela	3	1	0	2	34	58	−24	5	Quarter-finals
4	Guatemala	3	0	0	3	22	72	−50	3	Quarter-finals

Rules for classification: 1) Points; 2) Head-to-head result; 3) Point difference; 4) Points scored.

=== Knockout stage ===
Quarter-finals
2 August 2018 – Estadio Moderno
Colombia	24
Guatemala	0
2 August 2018 – Estadio Moderno
Jamaica	15
Guyana	10
2 August 2018 – Estadio Moderno
Mexico	31
Venezuela	0
2 August 2018 – Estadio Moderno
Trinidad and Tobago	20
Costa Rica	5

Semi-finals
2 August 2018 – Estadio Moderno
Colombia	26
Jamaica	0
2 August 2018 – Estadio Moderno
Mexico	29
Trinidad and Tobago	5

Gold-medal match
2 August 2018 – Estadio Moderno
Colombia	21
Mexico	14
Bronze-medal match
2 August 2018 – Estadio Moderno
Jamaica	26
Trinidad and Tobago	5

== Medal summary ==
Event	Gold	Silver	Bronze
Men's tournament	Colombia	Mexico	Jamaica
Women's tournament	Colombia: Nicole Acevedo; Leidy V. Soto Espinosa; Isabel Romero; Daniela Alzate Moncada; Valentina Tapias Cano; Marcela Osorio Zuluaga; Maria Isabel Arzuaga; Cindy S. Delgado; Camila Lopera; Laura Mejia Diosa; Sara I. Florez Arenas; Sharon Acevedo; Carmen Ibarra Cuesta	Venezuela: Jenimar Briceño; Mariana C. Romero; Yolanda J. Perez Yanez; Cristy A. Egido Sisiruca; Maryoly K. Gamez Pernia; Caring A. De Freitas; Kelly Angulo; Nardelys A. Alvarado; Marianny Y. Izarza; Daniela Olimar Diaz Silva; Moureen J. Baloa Perez; Rosmary Lujan	Mexico: Michelle Farah Chalita; Isabela Gonzalez; Carolina M. Sandoval; Alejandra D. Rosales; Irayda K. Macedo; Margely I. Angulo; Adriana Mendoza Silva; Maria F. Carrillo; Cecilia Y. Ramirez; Vanessa Ramirez; Bertha K. Landeros; María F. Tovar Preciado

== Medal table ==
* Host nation (Colombia)

Rank	Nation	Gold	Silver	Bronze	Total
1	Colombia (COL)*	2	0	0	2
2	Mexico (MEX)	0	1	1	2
3	Venezuela (VEN)	0	1	0	1
4	Jamaica (JAM)	0	0	1	1
Totals (4 entries)		2	2	2	6
