= Football at the 2018 Central American and Caribbean Games – Women's tournament =

2018 Central American and Caribbean Games - Women's Football Tournament
Tournament details
- Host country: Colombia
- Dates: 19 – 30 July
- Teams: 8 (from 2 confederations)
- Venue(s): 1 (in 1 host city)

Final positions
- Champions: Mexico (2nd title)
- Runners-up: Costa Rica
- Third place: Venezuela
- Fourth place: Trinidad and Tobago

Tournament statistics
- Matches played: 13
- Goals scored: 43 (3.31 per match)
- Top scorer(s): (Mexico) Charlyn Corral (Mexico) Katie Johnson (Mexico) Mónica Ocampo (3 goals each)

The women's football tournament at the 2018 Central American and Caribbean Games was held in Barranquilla, Colombia from 19 to 30 July.

== Participating teams ==
Region	Tournament	Teams qualified	Number of teams
Automatically qualified		Colombia (hosts); Mexico; Venezuela	3
Central American Football Union	2017 Central American Games	Costa Rica; Nicaragua	2
Caribbean Football Union	2018 CONCACAF Women's U-20 Championship	Trinidad and Tobago; Haiti; Jamaica	3
Total			8

== Squads ==
There are no age restrictions for the players participating in the tournament.

== Group stage ==
Tie-breakers

- a) greatest number of points obtained in all group matches;
- b) goal difference in all group matches;
- c) greatest number of goals scored in all group matches;

If two or more teams are equal on the basis of the above three criteria, their rankings will be determined as follows:

- d) greatest number of points obtained in the group matches between the teams concerned;
- e) goal difference resulting from the group matches between the teams concerned;
- f) greater number of goals scored in all group matches between the teams concerned;
- g) drawing of lots

All times are local (UTC−5).

=== Group A ===
Pos	Team	Pld	W	D	L	GF	GA	GD	Pts	Qualification
1	Costa Rica	3	3	0	0	5	2	+3	9	Advance to knockout stage
2	Venezuela	3	1	0	2	5	6	−1	3	Advance to knockout stage
3	Jamaica	3	1	0	2	4	5	−1	3	
4	Colombia (H)	3	1	0	2	4	5	−1	3	

Source: BAQ2018
Rules for classification: Tie-breakers
(H) Hosts
19 July 2018
10:00

Venezuela	2–1	Jamaica
Viso 56'; Castellanos 83'	Report	Shaw 12'

Estadio Moderno Julio Torres, Barranquilla
Referee: Tatiana Guzmán (Nicaragua)
19 July 2018
15:00

Colombia	0–1	Costa Rica
	Report	G. Villalobos 8'

Estadio Moderno Julio Torres, Barranquilla
Referee: Francia González (Mexico)

21 July 2018
16:00

Costa Rica	2–1	Jamaica
Alvarado 66'; Salas 90+3' (pen.)	Report	Shaw 57'

Estadio Moderno Julio Torres, Barranquilla
Referee: Crystal Sobers (Trinidad and Tobago)
21 July 2018
19:00

Colombia	3–2	Venezuela
Usme 4'; Vanegas 28'; Restrepo 45'	Report	Altuve 61', 71'

Estadio Moderno Julio Torres, Barranquilla
Referee: Melissa Borjas (Honduras)

23 July 2018
16:00

Costa Rica	2–1	Venezuela
Guillén 38'; G. Villalobos 60'	Report	Viso 52'

Estadio Moderno Julio Torres, Barranquilla
Referee: Suleimy Linarez (Cuba)
23 July 2018
19:00

Jamaica	2–1	Colombia
Asher 26'; Brown 52'	Report	Echeverri 34'

Estadio Moderno Julio Torres, Barranquilla
Referee: Maurees Skeete (Guyana)

=== Group B ===
Pos	Team	Pld	W	D	L	GF	GA	GD	Pts	Qualification
1	Mexico	3	3	0	0	12	1	+11	9	Advance to knockout stage
2	Trinidad and Tobago	3	1	1	1	6	7	−1	4	Advance to knockout stage
3	Nicaragua	3	1	1	1	5	6	−1	4	
4	Haiti	3	0	0	3	0	9	−9	0	Withdrew

Source: BAQ2018
Rules for classification: Tie-breakers
20 July 2018
16:00

Haiti	0–3 Forfeit	Nicaragua
	Report

Estadio Moderno Julio Torres, Barranquilla
Referee: Suleimy Linares (Cuba)
20 July 2018
19:00

Mexico	5–1	Trinidad and Tobago
Ocampo 20', 53'; Corral 54'; Johnson 65'; K. Robles 70'	Report	Hinds 57'

Estadio Moderno Julio Torres, Barranquilla
Referee: Sandra Benítez (El Salvador)

22 July 2018
16:00

Mexico	3–0 Forfeit	Haiti

Estadio Moderno Julio Torres, Barranquilla
22 July 2018
19:00

Trinidad and Tobago	2–2	Nicaragua
Silva 45' (o.g.); Ka. Forbes 47'	Report	Y. Flores 69', 75'

Estadio Moderno Julio Torres, Barranquilla
Referee: Odette Hamilton (Jamaica)

24 July 2018
16:00

Trinidad and Tobago	3–0 Forfeit	Haiti

Estadio Moderno Julio Torres, Barranquilla
24 July 2018
19:00

Nicaragua	0–4	Mexico
	Report	M. Sánchez 35'; Johnson 49'; Corral 52' (pen.); Monsiváis 69'

Estadio Moderno Julio Torres, Barranquilla
Referee: Marianela Araya (Costa Rica)

== Knockout stage ==
If necessary, extra time and penalty shoot-out are used to decide the winner.

Semi-finals
27 July — Barranquilla (Julio Torres)
Costa Rica	2
Trinidad and Tobago	0
27 July — Barranquilla (Julio Torres)
Mexico	3
Venezuela	1

Gold medal match
30 July — Barranquilla (Julio Torres)
Costa Rica	1
Mexico	3
Bronze medal match
30 July — Barranquilla (Julio Torres)
Trinidad and Tobago	0
Venezuela	1

=== Semi-finals ===
27 July 2018
16:00

Mexico	3–1	Venezuela
Ocampo 25'; M. Sánchez 70'; Franco 81'	Report	Villamizar 54'

Estadio Moderno Julio Torres, Barranquilla
Referee: Crystal Sobers (Trinidad and Tobago)

27 July 2018
19:00

Costa Rica	2–0	Trinidad and Tobago
C. Sánchez 33' (pen.); Porras 90+4'	Report

Estadio Moderno Julio Torres, Barranquilla
Referee: Francía González (Mexico)

=== Bronze medal match ===
30 July 2018
16:00

Trinidad and Tobago	0–1	Venezuela
	Report	Villamizar 59'

Estadio Moderno Julio Torres, Barranquilla
Referee: Marianela Araya (Costa Rica)

=== Gold medal match ===
30 July 2018
19:00

Costa Rica	1–3	Mexico
Alvarado 15' (pen.)	Report	Corral 60'; K. Robles 62'; Johnson 63'

Estadio Moderno Julio Torres, Barranquilla
Referee: Odette Hamilton (Jamaica)

== Goalscorers ==
There were 43 goals scored in 13 matches, for an average of 3.31 goals per match.

3 goals

- (Mexico) Charlyn Corral
- (Mexico) Katie Johnson
- (Mexico) Mónica Ocampo

2 goals

- (Costa Rica) Katherine Alvarado
- (Costa Rica) Gloriana Villalobos
- (Jamaica) Khadija Shaw
- (Mexico) Kenti Robles
- (Mexico) Maria Sánchez
- (Nicaragua) Yessenia Flores
- (Venezuela) Oriana Altuve
- (Venezuela) Paola Villamizar
- (Venezuela) Ysaura Viso

1 goal

- (Colombia) Isabella Echeverri
- (Colombia) Marcela Restrepo
- (Colombia) Catalina Usme
- (Colombia) Manuela Vanegas
- (Costa Rica) Gabriela Guillén
- (Costa Rica) María Paula Porras
- (Costa Rica) María Paula Salas
- (Costa Rica) Carol Sánchez
- (Jamaica) Chinyelu Asher
- (Jamaica) Jody Brown
- (Mexico) Yamile Franco
- (Mexico) Desirée Monsiváis
- (Trinidad and Tobago) Karyn Forbes
- (Trinidad and Tobago) Liana Hinds
- (Venezuela) Deyna Castellanos

1 own goal

- (Nicaragua) Martha Silva (against Trinidad and Tobago)
