= Sharon Acevedo =

Colombian rugby sevens player (born 1993)

- Full name: Sharon Evelin Acevedo Tangarife
- Born: October 15, 1993 (age 33)
- Height: 1.70 m (5 ft 7 in)
- Weight: 61 kg (134 lb)

Rugby union career
National sevens team
Years	Team	Comps
- Colombia
Medal record
Women's rugby sevens
Representing Colombia
Central American and Caribbean Games
Gold medal – first place	2014 Veracruz	Team competition
Gold medal – first place	2018 Barranquilla	Team competition

Sharon Evelin Acevedo Tangarife (born March 5, 1993) is a female rugby sevens player. She played for Colombia's women's national rugby sevens team at the 2015 Pan Am Games in Toronto. She was named in Colombia's women's 2016 Olympic sevens team.

She is the older sister of Nicole Acevedo who is also a rugby sevens player.
