= Rugby sevens at the 2013 Bolivarian Games =

Rugby sevens, for the 2013 Bolivarian Games, took place from 17 November to 19 November 2013.

== Medal summary ==
Event	Gold	Silver	Bronze
Men	Chile: Nicola Bursic; Martin Verschae; Francisco Neira; German Javier Hiram Herrera Luhrs; Tomas Esteban Pinto Matulic; Simon Salinas; Pablo Bruzzone; Nicolas Cifuentes; Italo Zunino; Julian Duco; Mauricio Andres Urrutia Lues; Branko Boris Bakulic Meneses	Colombia: Sebastian Mejia Gil; Camilo Cadavid Cardona; Fausto Andres Mosquera Garces; Arnold Yesid Jinete Arias; Carlos Andres Chateau; Brayan Alexis Campiño Riascos; Pablo David Lemoine Arboleda; Juan David Cuesta Ruiz; Jose Manuel Diosa Gomez; Jhoan Cebastian Zurique Borja; Oscar Steven Forero Fandiño; Juan Gabriel Davila Metaute	Paraguay: Fabrizio da Rosa; Pablo Espinola; Leonardo Glitz; Eymard Brizuela; Adrian Bogado; Diego Argaña Noguera; Julio Romero; Renato Cardona; Vicente Amigo Lopez; Horacio Agüero; Carlos Edgar Plate Stanley; Mathius Ortiz
Women	Colombia: Angela Rocio Lozano Cardenas; Ruth Johanna Lozano Cardenas; Claudia Alejandra Betancur Suescun; Ana Catalina Ramirez Talero; Suesar Escobar Luna; Natalia Frinta Gonzalez; Luz Carime Garcia Zapata; Cindy Solangie Delgado Buitrago; Camila Lopera; Guadalupe de la Cruz Lopez Botero; Sadia Camila Cardona Aranda; Laura Isabel Gonzalez Gonzalez	Venezuela: Sandra Patricia Lugo Moreno; Estafania Salami; Lucelys Maria Medina Herrera; Ana Michel Fernandez; Isamar Andreina Suarez Suarez; Jetsy Andreina Ferrera Carvajal; Claudia Contreras; Trilivett Isabel Suarez Sosa; Daniela Gonzalez; Daniela Olimar Diaz Silva; Yudannys Carolina Eduardo Mellado; Ingrid Carolina Griffin Algarra	Peru: María Paz Reyes Flores; María Alejandra Valencia Quiroz; Maria Flavia Connearn Díaz; Ximena Narda Choy Henriquez; Rosemary Quesada Guzmán; Cristina Mariana Villalobos Portocarr; Daniela Muñoz Donoso; María Samantha Chuquivala Pérez; Melissa Vargas de la Jara; Diana Fiorella Riesco Lind; Lineth Noriega Hart; Jimena Raymi Requena Cereceda
