= Reina Beltman =

Dutch artistic gymnast

- Full name: Reina Becky Beltman
- Born: 9 June 1996 (age 30) Hoorn, Netherlands

Gymnastics career
- Discipline: Women's artistic gymnastics
- Country represented: Netherlands (2014–Present (NED))
- Club: G.T.V. DE HAZENKAMP
- Head coach: Edwin Zegers

Reina Beltman (born 9 June 1996) is a Dutch female artistic gymnast, representing her nation at international competitions. She was an alternate alongside Tisha Volleman for the 2016 Summer Olympics.
