= Ana Ramírez (rugby union) =

Colombian rugby union player (born 1991)

- Full name: Ana Catalina Ramírez Talero
- Born: December 6, 1991 (age 34)
- Height: 168 cm (5 ft 6 in)
- Weight: 69 kg (152 lb)

Rugby union career
National sevens team
Years	Team	Comps
- Colombia
Medal record
Women's rugby sevens
Representing Colombia
Central American and Caribbean Games
Gold medal – first place	2014 Veracruz	Team competition
Bolivarian Games
Gold medal – first place	2013 Trujillo	Team competition

Ana Catalina Ramírez Talero (born December 6, 1991) is a Colombian female rugby sevens player for the Colombian women's national rugby sevens team. She was in the squad for the 2015 Pan Am Games. She was also named in their squad for the 2016 Summer Olympics.
