= Solangie Delgado =

Colombian rugby sevens player (born 1989)

- Full name: Cindy Solangie Delgado Buitrago
- Born: November 9, 1989 (age 37)
- Height: 1.55 m (5 ft 1 in)
- Weight: 57 kg (126 lb)

Rugby union career
National sevens team
Years	Team	Comps
- Colombia
Medal record
Women's rugby sevens
Representing Colombia
Central American and Caribbean Games
Gold medal – first place	2018 Barranquilla	Team competition
Bolivarian Games
Gold medal – first place	2013 Trujillo	Team competition

Cindy Solangie Delgado Buitrago (born November 9, 1989) is a Colombian rugby sevens player. She plays for Colombia women's national rugby sevens team and was a member of the squad for the 2015 Pan American Games. She has been selected to be part of Colombia's women's sevens team to the 2016 Summer Olympics in Brazil.
