= Alejandra Betancur =

Colombian rugby sevens player

- Full name: Claudia Alejandra Betancur Suescun
- Born: June 13, 1987 (age 39)
- Height: 1.6 m (5 ft 3 in)
- Weight: 82 kg (181 lb)

Rugby union career
National sevens team
Years	Team	Comps
- Colombia
Medal record
Women's rugby sevens
Representing Colombia
Bolivarian Games
Gold medal – first place	2013 Trujillo	Team competition

Claudia Alejandra Betancur Suescun (born June 13, 1987) is a Colombian rugby sevens player. She was a member of Colombia's women's national rugby sevens team for the 2016 Summer Olympics. She also competed at the 2015 Pan Am Games.
