= Gymnastics at the 2016 Summer Olympics – Women's balance beam =

Women's balance beam at the Games of the XXXI Olympiad
- Venue: HSBC Arena
- Date: 15 August 2016
- Competitors: 13 from 9 nations
- Winning score: 15.466

Medalists
1st place, gold medalist(s)		Sanne Wevers	Netherlands
2nd place, silver medalist(s)		Laurie Hernandez	United States
3rd place, bronze medalist(s)		Simone Biles	United States

The women's balance beam competition at the 2016 Summer Olympics was held at the HSBC Arena on 15 August.

== Competition format ==
The top 8 qualifiers in the qualification phase (limit two per NOC), based on combined score of each apparatus, advanced to the individual all-around final. The finalists performed on each apparatus again. Qualification scores were then ignored, with only final round scores counting.

== Qualification ==
The gymnasts who ranked top eight qualified for final round. In cases where there were more than two gymnasts in the same NOC, the last ranked among them would not qualify to the final round. The next best ranked gymnast would qualify instead.

Position	Gymnast	Nation	D Score	E Score	Penalty	Total	Qualification
1	Simone Biles	United States	6.700	8.933		15.633	Q
2	Laurie Hernandez	United States	6.400	8.966		15.366	Q
3	Flavia Saraiva	Brazil	6.300	8.833		15.133	Q
4	Sanne Wevers	Netherlands	6.300	8.766		15.066	Q
5	Catalina Ponor	Romania	6.200	8.700		14.900	Q
6	Fan Yilin	China	6.400	8.466		14.866	Q
7	Gabby Douglas	United States	6.300	8.533		14.833	–
7	Alexandra Raisman	United States	6.300	8.533		14.833	–
9	Marine Boyer	France	6.200	8.400		14.600	Q
10	Isabela Onyshko	Canada	6.500	8.033		14.533	Q
11	Elissa Downie	Great Britain	5.900	8.600		14.500	R
12	Amy Tinkler	Great Britain	6.200	8.300		14.500	R
13	Tutya Yilmaz	Turkey	6.300	8.200		14.500	R

Only two gymnasts from each country may advance to the balance beam final. Therefore, in some cases, a third and/or fourth placed high enough to qualify, but did not advance to the final because of the quota. Gymnasts who did not advance to the final, but had high enough scores to do so were:

- Gabby Douglas (USA) (T-7th place)
- Aly Raisman (USA) (T-7th place)

== Final ==
Position	Name	Difficulty	Execution	Penalty	Total
1st place, gold medalist(s)	Sanne Wevers (NED)	6.600	8.866		15.466
2nd place, silver medalist(s)	Laurie Hernandez (USA)	6.400	8.933		15.333
3rd place, bronze medalist(s)	Simone Biles (USA)	6.500	8.233		14.733
4	Marine Boyer (FRA)	6.100	8.500		14.600
5	Flávia Saraiva (BRA)	6.300	8.233		14.533
6	Fan Yilin (CHN)	6.300	8.200		14.500
7	Cătălina Ponor (ROU)	5.800	8.200		14.000
8	Isabela Onyshko (CAN)	6.100	7.300		13.400

1. Laurie Hernandez and Marine Boyer appealed against their scores, but both inquiries were rejected.

== Gallery ==
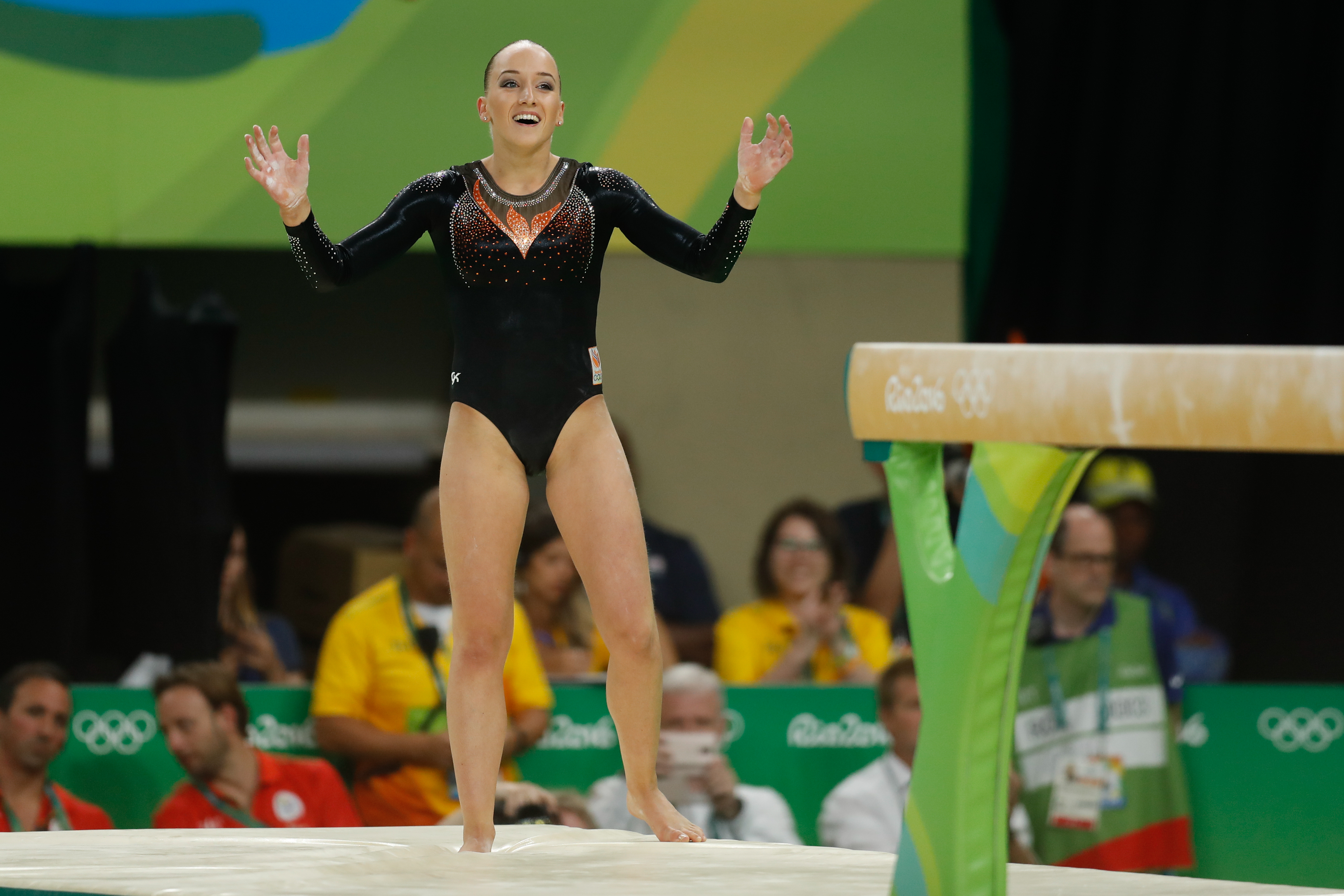
Sanne Wevers

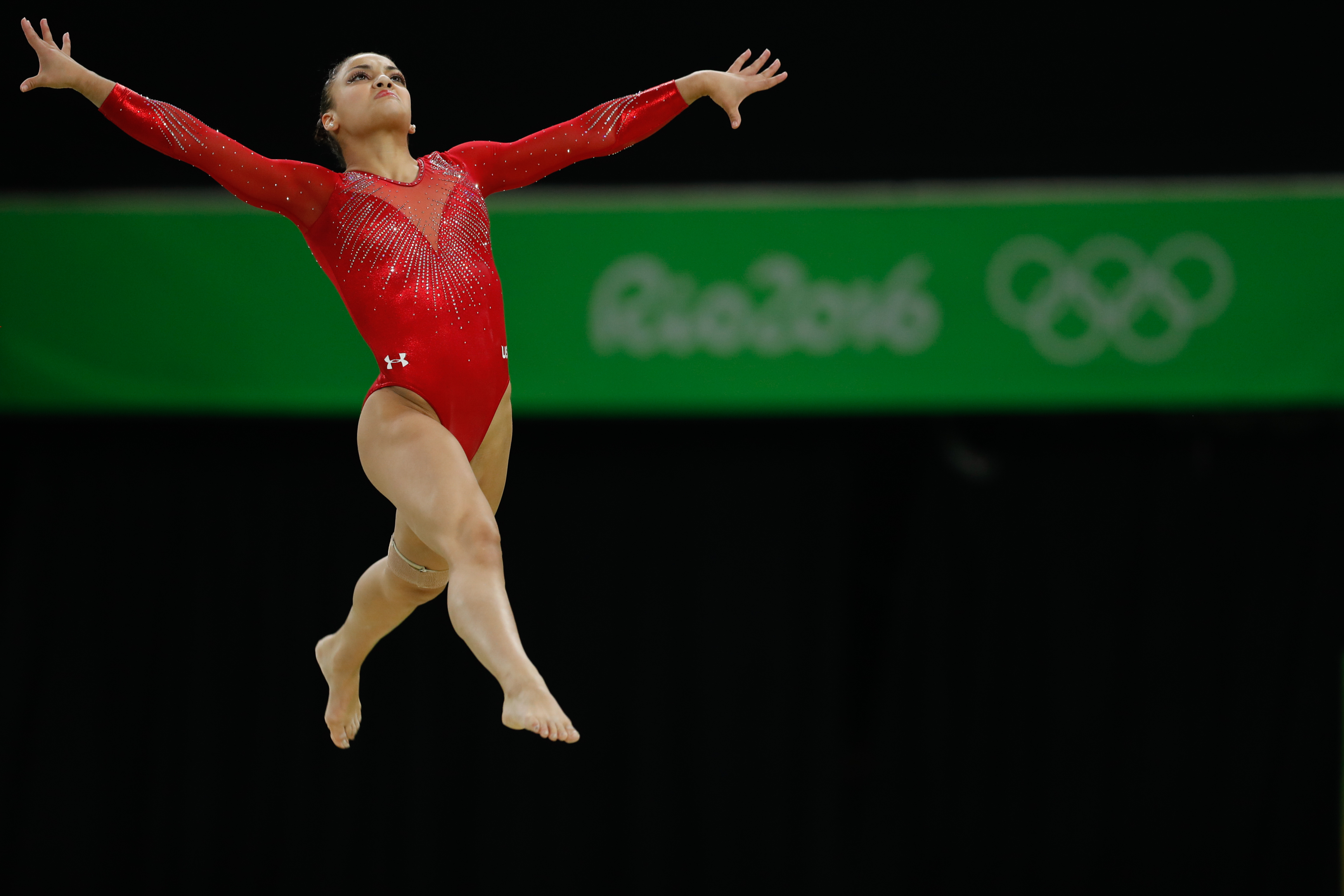
Laurie Hernandez

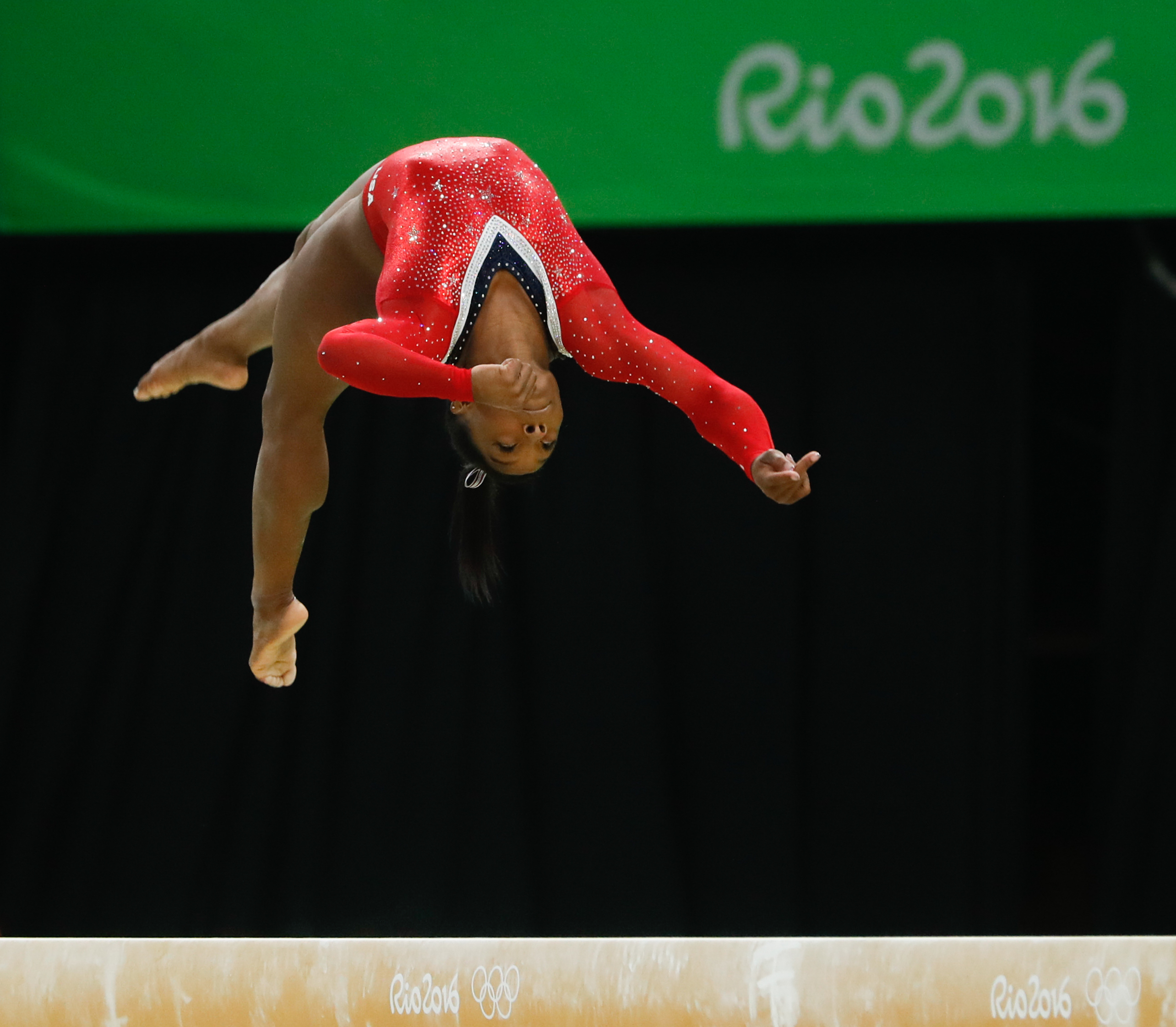
Simone Biles

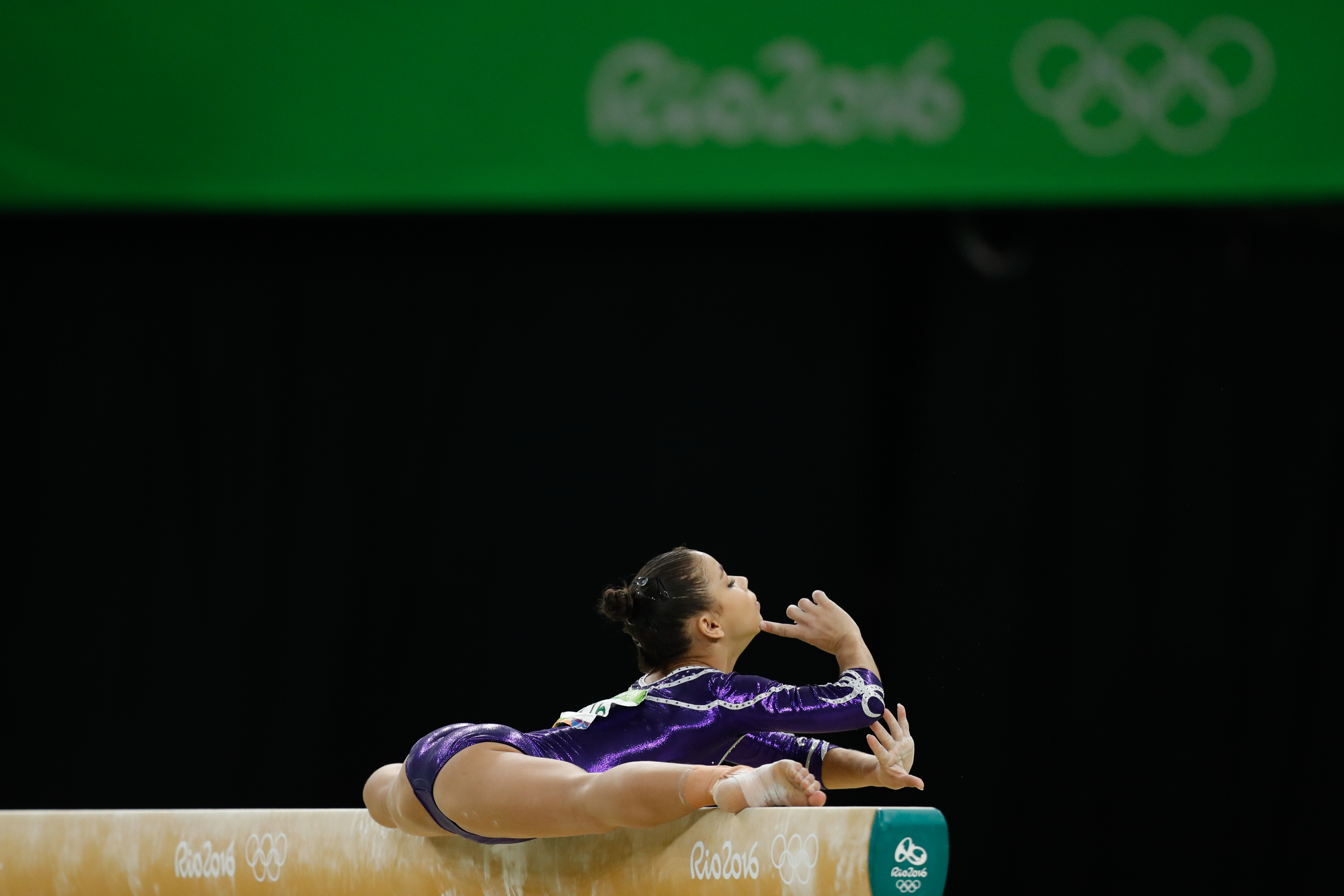
Flávia Saraiva

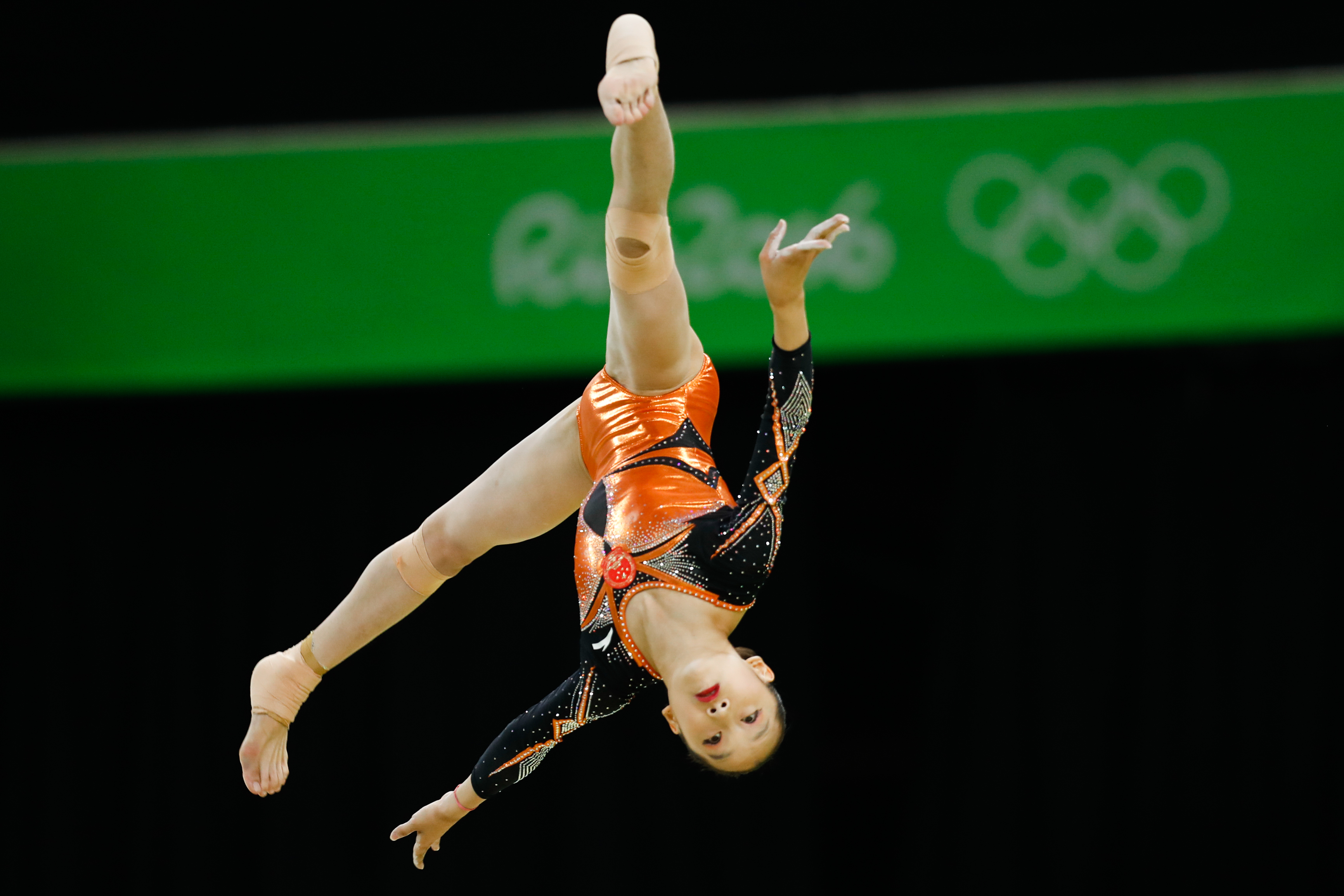
Fan Yilin

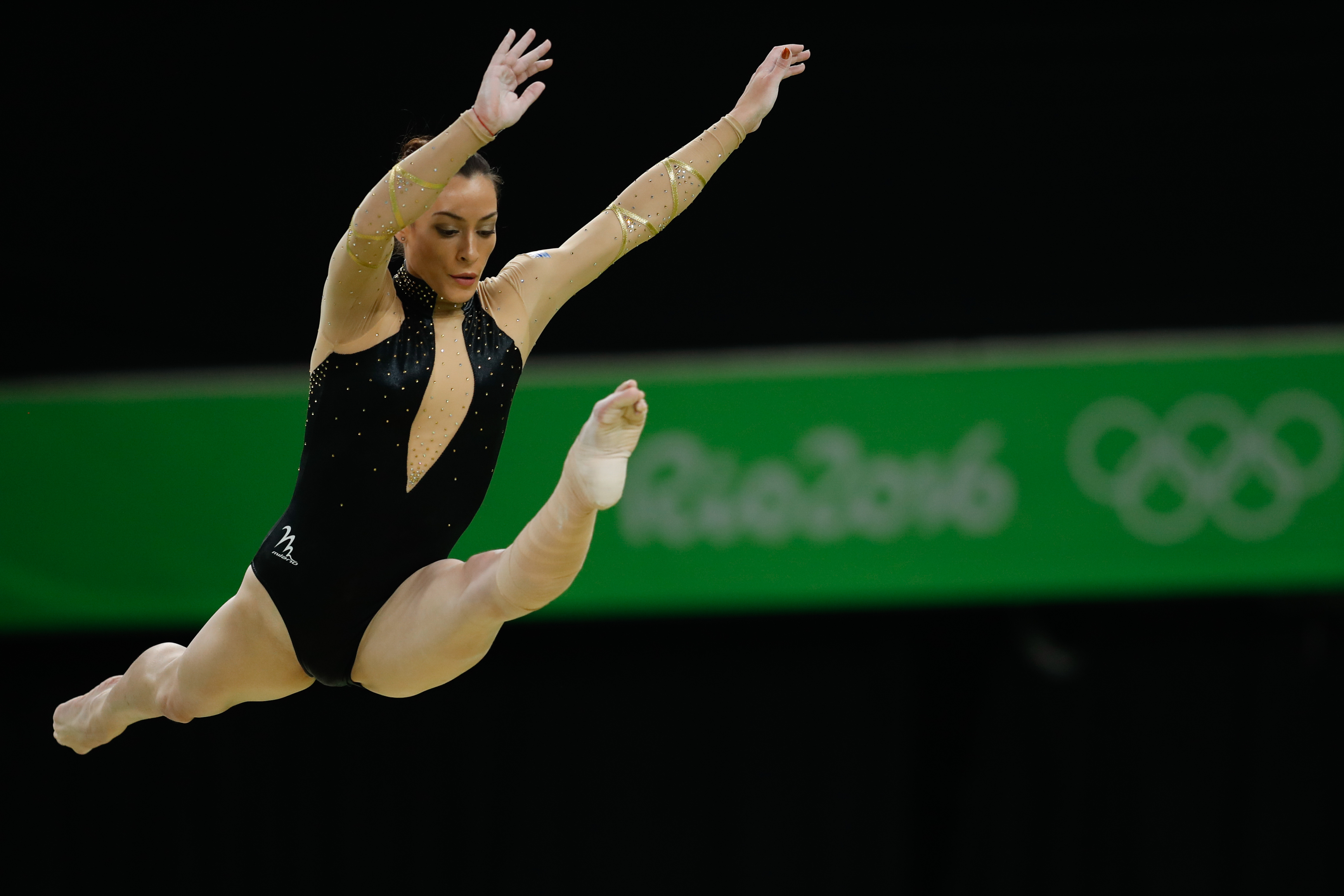
Cătălina Ponor

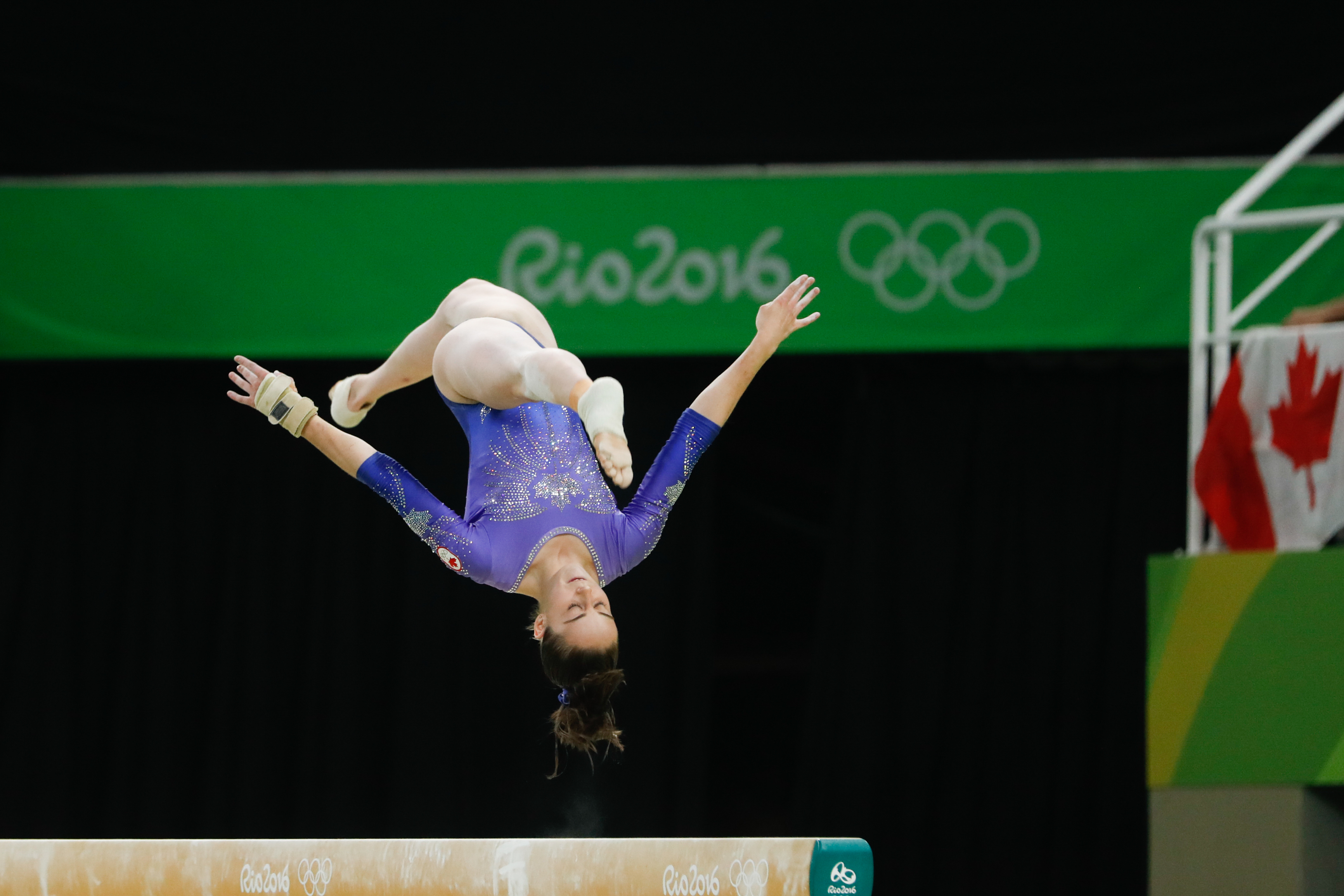
Isabela Onyshko
