= Camila Lopera =

Colombian rugby sevens player

- Full name: María Camila Lopera Valle
- Born: 18 April 1995 (age 31)
- Height: 1.54 m (5 ft 1 in)
- Weight: 54 kg (119 lb)

Rugby union career
International career
Years	Team	Apps	(Points)
- Colombia
National sevens team
Years	Team		Comps
- Colombia
Medal record
Representing Colombia
Women's rugby sevens
Event	1st	2nd	3rd
Pan American Games	0	0	1
CAC Games	2	0	0
South American Games	0	0	1
Bolivarian Games	2	1	0
Pan American Games
Bronze medal – third place	2019 Lima	Team competition
Central American and Caribbean Games
Gold medal – first place	2014 Veracruz	Team competition
Gold medal – first place	2018 Barranquilla	Team competition
South American Games
Bronze medal – third place	2022 Asunción	Team competition
Bolivarian Games
Gold medal – first place	2013 Trujillo	Team competition
Gold medal – first place	2017 Santa Marta	Team competition
Silver medal – second place	2022 Valledupar	Team competition

María Camila Lopera Valle (born 18 April 1995) is a Colombian rugby sevens player. She represented Colombia at the 2015 Pan Am Games as part of the Colombian women's national rugby sevens team. She was a member of Colombia's sevens team for the 2016 Olympics in Rio de Janeiro, Brazil.

In 2022, Lopera Valle captained Colombia at the Rugby World Cup Sevens in Cape Town.

On 21 September 2023, Valle was named in Colombia's fifteens squad that will compete in the inaugural WXV 3 tournament in Dubai.
