= Nicole Acevedo =

Colombian rugby sevens player (born 1994)

- Full name: Nicole Jocelin Acevedo Tangarife
- Born: October 15, 1994 (age 32)
- Height: 1.66 m (5 ft 5 in)
- Weight: 70 kg (154 lb)

Rugby union career
National sevens team
| Years | Team | Comps |
- Colombia
Medal record
Representing Colombia
Women's rugby sevens
Pan American Games
| Bronze medal – third place | 2019 Lima | Team competition |
Central American and Caribbean Games
| Gold medal – first place | 2014 Veracruz | Team competition |
| Gold medal – first place | 2018 Barranquilla | Team competition |

Nicole Jocelin Acevedo Tangarife (born October 15, 1994) is a Colombian rugby sevens player. She represented Colombia at the 2015 Pan Am Games. She is named in Colombia's women's national rugby sevens team to the 2016 Summer Olympics.
