= Guadalupe López =

- Full name: Guadalupe de la Cruz López Botero
- Born: January 12, 1988 (age 38)
- Height: 1.65 m (5 ft 5 in)
- Weight: 58 kg (128 lb)

Rugby union career
- Position: centro
National sevens team
Years	Team	Comps
- Colombia
Medal record
Women's rugby sevens
Representing Colombia
Bolivarian Games
Gold medal – first place	2013 Trujillo	Team competition

Guadalupe de la Cruz López Botero (born 12 January 1987) is a Colombian rugby sevens player. She played at the 2015 Pan Am Games. López was selected for the Colombia women's national rugby sevens team to the 2016 Summer Olympics.
