= Laura González (rugby union) =

Colombian rugby sevens player

- Full name: Laura Isabel González González
- Born: 8 February 1993 (age 33) Medellín, Colombia
- Height: 1.61 m (5 ft 3 in)
- Weight: 54 kg (119 lb)

Rugby union career
National sevens team
Years	Team	Comps
- Colombia
Medal record
Women's rugby sevens
Representing Colombia
Bolivarian Games
Gold medal – first place	2013 Trujillo	Team competition

Laura Isabel González González (born 8 February 1993) is a Colombian rugby sevens player. She was selected for the Colombian women's national rugby sevens team to the 2016 Summer Olympics.
