= Estadio Moderno Julio Torres =

Multi-use stadium in Barranquilla, Colombia

- Interactive map of Estadio Moderno Julio Torres
- Coordinates: 10.9634168°N 74.7830892°W
- Capacity: 2,175
- Surface: Grass

Construction
- Opened: 1922
- Renovated: 2017

Estadio Moderno Julio Torres is a multi-use stadium in Barranquilla, Colombia.

The stadium was given national monument status in July 2006.

The stadium was named as the host for the Women's football tournament at the 2018 Central American and Caribbean Games.
