= Rugby sevens at the 2025 Junior Pan American Games =

Rugby sevens at the 2025 Junior American Games
- Venue: Estadio Héroes de Curupayty
- Start date: August 16, 2025
- End date: August 17, 2025
- No. of events: 2 (1 men, 1 women)
- Competitors: 192 from 12 nations

The rugby sevens events at the 2025 Junior Pan American Games were held at the Estadio Héroes de Curupayty, located in the Olympic Park in Luque, in the Greater Asuncion area. The events were contested between August 16 and 17, 2025.

Two tournaments were contested, one for men and one for women. The winner of each event qualified for the 2027 Pan American Games in Lima, Peru.

== Qualification ==
A total of eight teams qualified for each tournament.

=== Men's qualification ===
Qualification	Date	Host/Country	Berths	Qualified team
Host country	—N/a		1	Paraguay
RAN Pre-qualified teams	—N/a	—N/a	2	~~United States~~; ~~Canada~~
2024 RAN Sevens	22–24 November 2024	Arima	2	Trinidad and Tobago; Jamaica
Pre-qualified for being part of the 2024–25 SVNS	—N/a	—N/a	2	Argentina; Uruguay
2024 Sudamérica Rugby Sevens	26–27 October 2024	Lima	1	Chile
Reallocation	—N/a	—N/a	1	Bermuda; Mexico

=== Women's qualification ===
Qualification	Date	Host/Country	Berths	Qualified team
Host country	—N/a		1	Paraguay
RAN Pre-qualified teams	—N/a	—N/a	2	United States; Canada
2024 RAN Women's Sevens	22–24 November 2024	Arima	2	Mexico; Jamaica
Pre-qualified for being part of the 2024–25 SVNS	—N/a	—N/a	1	Brazil
2024 Sudamérica Rugby Women's Sevens	26–27 October 2024	Lima	1	Argentina; Colombia

== Medal summary ==
=== Medal table ===
* Host nation (Paraguay)

Rank	Nation	Gold	Silver	Bronze	Total
1	Argentina	1	0	0	1
1	Brazil	1	0	0	1
3	United States	0	1	0	1
3	Uruguay	0	1	0	1
5	Canada	0	0	1	1
5	Chile	0	0	1	1
Totals (6 entries)		2	2	2	6

=== Medalists ===
Event	Gold	Silver	Bronze
Men's tournament	Argentina; Manuel Domnanovich; Danilo Ghisolfi; Valentín Maldonado Castro; Juan Patricio Batac; Jerónimo Sorondo; Agustín Tomás García Herdt; Sebastián Dubuc; Juan Ignacio Carreras; Bautista Lescano; Mateo Fossati; Luca Corleto; Valentino Rebuffi	Uruguay; Alfonso Perillo; Mateo Acosta; Francisco Gallo; Bruno Baccino; Manuel Parodi; Valentín Vargas; Joaquín Fresnedo; Iván Peters; Federico Lawlor; Francisco Landauer; Manuel Martínez; Andrew Hobbins	Chile; Rodrigo Araya; Claudio Roa; Tomás Queirolo; Lucas Pizarro; Mateo Alcaide; Martín Cura; Dimitri Simonidis; Lukas Winkler; Santiago Wood; José Bonilla; Marco Alvano; Nicolás Saab
Women's tournament	Brazil; Raylanne Nascimento; Ariely Faria; Heloysa Macedo; Letícia Pinheiro; Mariely Faria; Isabelle Gonçalves; Geovanna Carvalho; Giovanna Braz; Cláudia Beltran; Agatha Vitória Fernandes; Maria Gabrieli Pereira; Mariana Neves	United States; Paola Arredondo Almeida; Kiyanah Edwards; Kori Fields; Annie Henrich; Marley Larkin; Florinalaulaau Liufau; Lionala Mayorga; Jayna Schalesky; Fane Tausinga; Vasiti Turagavou; Annabella Vogel; Tahna Wilfley	Canada; Bomi Lawal; Kiki Idowu; Sarah Schonfeld; Olivia Newsome; Adia Pye; Zina Umeh; Ivy Poetker; Kennedi Stevenson; Adelaide Holmes; Charlotte Hilton; Elle Douglas; Kelsa Kempf

== Men's tournament ==
All times are in Paraguay Time (UTC−3).

=== Preliminary round ===
==== Group A ====
Pos	Team	Pld	W	D	L	PF	PA	PD	Pts	Qualification
1	Argentina	3	3	0	0	135	12	+123	9	Semifinals
2	Paraguay	3	1	1	1	43	42	+1	6	Semifinals
3	Trinidad and Tobago	3	1	1	1	42	82	−40	6	5–8th place semifinals
4	Bermuda	3	0	0	3	19	103	−84	3	5–8th place semifinals

Source: Asunción 2025
Rules for classification: 1) Points; 2) Head-to-head result; 3) Point difference; 4) Points scored; 5) draw.

16 August 2025
10:58

Paraguay	14–14	Trinidad and Tobago
Try: Amarilla 4'; Grau 8'; Con: Alvarado (1/1) 5'; Marecos (1/1) 8'	Report	Try: George 2'; Baptiste 7'; Con: Baptiste (1/1) 2'; Edwards (1/1) 7'

Estadio Héroes de Curupayty
Referee: Luca Solda (Argentina)

16 August 2025
11:20

Argentina	51–7	Bermuda
Try: Sorondo (2) 0', 2'; Domnanovich (3) 3', 7', 1'; Dubuc 5'; Carreras 5'; Ghisolfi 6'; Batac 7'; Con: Fossati (1/3) 4'; Carreras (2/3) 5', 7'	Report	Try: Kendall 4'; Con: Kendall (1/1) 4'

Estadio Héroes de Curupayty
Referee: Sergio Alvarenga (Paraguay)

16 August 2025
16:13

Paraguay	24–0	Bermuda
Try: Blaires 1'; Rubin 4'; Alvarado 7'; Amarilla 8'; Con: Alvarado (2/4) 1', 7'	Report

Estadio Héroes de Curupayty
Referee: Stephen Kinasevich (Canada)

16 August 2025
16:35

Argentina	56–0	Trinidad and Tobago
Try: Batac 2'; García Herdt (2) 4', 0'; Ghisolfi 7'; Sorondo 1'; Carreras 2'; Dubuc (2) 3', 6'; Con: Batac (1/1) 1'; Lescano (4/4) 4', 0', 1', 2'; Fossati (1/1) 7'; Dubuc (2/2) 4', 6'	Report

Estadio Héroes de Curupayty
Referee: Sebastian Toledo (Chile)

16 August 2025
19:09

Trinidad and Tobago	28–12	Bermuda
Try: Baptiste 3'; Edwards 5'; George (2) 5', 7'; Con: Edwards (2/2) 3', 5'; George (1/1) 7'	Report	Try: Summers 2'; Simons 4'; Con: Kendall (1/1) 4'

Estadio Héroes de Curupayty
Referee: Axel Cortazar (Paraguay)

16 August 2025
19:31

Argentina	28–5	Paraguay
Try: Batac 3'; Fossati (2) 4', 2'; Dubuc 0'; Con: Batac (1/1) 3'; Fossati (2/2) 4', 2'; Dubuc (1/1) 0'	Report	Try: Grau 7'

Estadio Héroes de Curupayty
Referee: Stephen Kinasevich (Canada)

==== Group B ====
Pos	Team	Pld	W	D	L	PF	PA	PD	Pts	Qualification
1	Uruguay	3	2	1	0	106	24	+82	8	Semifinals
2	Chile	3	2	1	0	87	12	+75	8	Semifinals
3	Mexico	3	1	0	2	28	89	−61	5	5–8th place semifinals
4	Jamaica	3	0	0	3	17	113	−96	3	5–8th place semifinals

Source: Asunción 2025
Rules for classification: 1) Points; 2) Head-to-head result; 3) Point difference; 4) Points scored; 5) draw.

16 August 2025
11:42

Chile	39–0	Jamaica
Try: Araya 1'; Pizarro 3'; Saab (2) 5', 2'; Alvano 6'; Bonilla 1'; Roa 6'; Con: Cura (1/1) 2'; Roa (1/1) 6'	Report

Estadio Héroes de Curupayty
Referee: Axel Cortazar (Paraguay)

16 August 2025
12:04

Uruguay	41–7	Mexico
Try: Hobbins 3'; Fresnedo (2) 5', 0'; Vargas (2) 6', 3'; Landauer 1'; Lawlor 4'; Con: Landauer (3/5) 4', 5', 1'	Report	Try: Zamora 7'; Con: Carbajal (1/1) 7'

Estadio Héroes de Curupayty
Referee: Stephen Kinasevich (Canada)

16 August 2025
16:57

Chile	36–0	Mexico
Try: Pizarro (2) 1', 6'; Winkler 3'; Wood 4'; Simonidis 3'; Araya 4'; Con: Bonilla (2/3) 1', 3'; Roa (1/2) 6'	Report

Estadio Héroes de Curupayty
Referee: Armen Abi Saab (Uruguay)

16 August 2025
17:19

Uruguay	53–5	Jamaica
Try: Martínez (2) 1', 2'; Landauer 5'; Vargas 7'; Acosta 0'; Parodi 4'; Baccino 2'; Fresnedo (2) 5', 7'; Con: Landauer (3/5) 1', 2'; Parodi (1/4) 4'	Report	Try: Gordon 4'

Estadio Héroes de Curupayty
Referee: Lucas Saccomanno (Brazil)

16 August 2025
19:53

Jamaica	12–21	Mexico
Try: Blake 1'; Hutchinson 1'; Con: Gordon (1/2) 1'	Report	Try: Zamora 4'; Vidaurri 6'; Carbajal 3'; Con: Carbajal (3/3) 4', 6', 3'

Estadio Héroes de Curupayty
Referee: Sergio Alvarenga (Paraguay)

16 August 2025
20:15

Uruguay	12–12	Chile
Try: Baccino 7'; Landauer 7'; Con: Landauer (1/2) 7'	Report	Try: Winkler (2) 6', 5'; Con: Bonilla (1/2) 6'

Estadio Héroes de Curupayty
Referee: Luca Solda (Argentina)

=== Fifth to eighth place classification ===
Semi-finals
17 August — 10:50 — Luque
Trinidad and Tobago	0
Jamaica	27
17 August — 11:15 — Luque
Mexico	12
Bermuda	10

Fifth Place
17 August — 16:45 — Luque
Jamaica	15
Mexico	12
Seventh Place
17 August — 15:55 — Luque
Trinidad and Tobago	24
Bermuda	10

==== 5–8th place semifinals ====
17 August 2025
10:50

Trinidad and Tobago	0–27	Jamaica
	Report	Try: Gordon (2) 0', 6'; Miller 3'; Gray 5'; Graham-Mulvaney 7'; Con: Miller (1/3) 7'

Estadio Héroes de Curupayty
Referee: Sebastian Toledo (Chile)

17 August 2025
11:15

Mexico	12–10	Bermuda
Try: Vidaurri 5'; Montiaga 5'; Con: Lagarda (1/1) 6'	Report	Try: Kendall 2'; Noel-Simmons 6'

Estadio Héroes de Curupayty
Referee: Armen Abi Saab (Uruguay)

==== Seventh place match ====
17 August 2025
15:55

Trinidad and Tobago	24–10	Bermuda
Try: George (2) 1', 4'; Edwards 0'; Moore 3'; Con: Edwards (2/4) 5', 0'	Report	Try: Smith 6'; Noel-Simmons 6'

Estadio Héroes de Curupayty
Referee: Sebastian Toledo (Chile)

==== Fifth place match ====
17 August 2025
16:45

Jamaica	15–12	Mexico
Try: Gray 0'; Graham-Mulvaney 7'; Taylor 2'	Report	Try: Montiaga 4'; Vidaurri 7'

Estadio Héroes de Curupayty
Referee: Armen Abi Saab (Uruguay)

=== Medal round ===
Semi-finals
17 August — 12:30 — Luque
Argentina	26
Chile	5
17 August — 12:55 — Luque
Uruguay	45
Paraguay	0

Final
17 August — 18:45 — Luque
Argentina	22
Uruguay	17
Third Place
17 August — 17:35 — Luque
Chile	36
Paraguay	12

==== Semifinals ====
17 August 2025
12:30

Argentina	26–5	Chile
Try: Fossati (2) 2', 1'; Dubuc 5'; García Herdt 5'; Con: Dubuc (1/1) 5'; Fossati (1/2) 1'; Lescano (1/1) 5'	Report	Try: Wood 6'

Estadio Héroes de Curupayty
Referee: Sergio Alvarenga (Paraguay)

17 August 2025
12:55

Uruguay	45–0	Paraguay
Try: Acosta (2) 0', 1'; Vargas 4'; Fresnedo (2) 5', 7'; Hobbins 5'; Gallo 7'; Con: Landauer (4/5) 4', 5', 7', 1'; Parodi (1/2) 5'	Report

Estadio Héroes de Curupayty
Referee: Stephen Kinasevich (Canada)

==== Bronze medal match ====
17 August 2025
17:35

Chile	36–12	Paraguay
Try: Bonilla 0'; Saab 2'; Araya (2) 5', 8'; Winkler (2) 7', 3'; Con: Wood (2/2) 2', 7'; Bonilla (1/2) 5'	Report	Try: Amarilla 4'; Rubin 6'; Con: Alvarado (1/2) 7'

Estadio Héroes de Curupayty
Referee: Stephen Kinasevich (Canada)

==== Gold medal match ====
17 August 2025
18:45

Argentina	22–17	Uruguay
Try: Dubuc (2) 7', 3'; Batac (2) 2', 3'; Con: Dubuc (1/1) 7'	Report	Try: Fresnedo 1'; Landauer 3'; Vargas 5'; Con: Landauer (1/3) 3'

Estadio Héroes de Curupayty
Referee: Sergio Alvarenga (Paraguay)

== Women's tournament ==
All times are in Paraguay Time (UTC−3).

=== Preliminary round ===
==== Group A ====
Pos	Team	Pld	W	D	L	PF	PA	PD	Pts	Qualification
1	Canada	3	3	0	0	94	24	+70	9	Semifinals
2	Argentina	3	2	0	1	88	29	+59	7	Semifinals
3	Colombia	3	1	0	2	65	33	+32	5	5–8th place semifinals
4	Jamaica	3	0	0	3	0	161	−161	3	5–8th place semifinals

Source: Asunción 2025
Rules for classification: 1) Points; 2) Head-to-head result; 3) Point difference; 4) Points scored; 5) draw.

16 August 2025
09:30

Argentina	14–7	Colombia
Try: Gonzalez 0'; Iacaruso 2'; Con: Ibañez (2/2) 1', 3'	Report	Try: Acalo 4'; Con: Jiménez (1/1) 4'

Estadio Héroes de Curupayty
Referee: Alexis Saari (United States)

16 August 2025
09:52

Canada	53–0	Jamaica
Try: Umeh (2) 0', 2'; Newsome 2'; Stevenson 5'; Idowu 1'; Holmes 3'; Pye 5'; Lawal 6'; Kempf 7'; Con: Newsome (3/6) 3', 1', 2'; Douglas (1/3) 5'	Report

Estadio Héroes de Curupayty
Referee: Sebastian Toledo (Chile)

16 August 2025
14:30

Argentina	62–0	Jamaica
Try: Pedalino 0'; Gervasio (2) 2', 1'; Iacaruso 4'; Velazquez 5'; Ibañez 7'; Mercado 2'; Lopez 4'; Velay 6'; Echaves 7'; Con: Ibañez (4/5) 1', 5', 5', 7'; Velazquez (1/2) 1'; Juan (1/1) 7'	Report

Estadio Héroes de Curupayty
Referee: Axel Cortazar (Paraguay)

16 August 2025
14:52

Canada	19–12	Colombia
Try: Pye (2) 5', 4'; Poetker 7'; Con: Newsome (2/3) 5', 4'	Report	Try: Ruco (2) 1', 3'

Estadio Héroes de Curupayty
Referee: Sergio Alvarenga (Paraguay)

16 August 2025
17:41

Colombia	46–0	Jamaica
Try: Córdoba (2) 2', 0'; Jiménez 3'; Pino 5'; Tobón 3'; Rios 5'; Renteria 6'; Ruco 8'; Con: Jiménez (2/4) 3'; Acalo (1/3) 5'	Report

Estadio Héroes de Curupayty
Referee: Alexis Saari (United States)

16 August 2025
18:03

Canada	22–12	Argentina
Try: Pye (2) 5', 4'; Stevenson (2) 1', 1'; Con: Umeh (1/2) 5'	Report	Try: Gervasio 4'; Gonzalez 7'; Con: Ibañez (1/2) 4'

Estadio Héroes de Curupayty
Referee: Laura Garcia (Colombia)

==== Group B ====
Pos	Team	Pld	W	D	L	PF	PA	PD	Pts	Qualification
1	United States	3	3	0	0	106	5	+101	9	Semifinals
2	Brazil	3	2	0	1	108	19	+89	7	Semifinals
3	Mexico	3	1	0	2	27	85	−58	5	5–8th place semifinals
4	Paraguay	3	0	0	3	0	132	−132	3	5–8th place semifinals

Source: Asunción 2025
Rules for classification: 1) Points; 2) Head-to-head result; 3) Point difference; 4) Points scored; 5) draw.

16 August 2025
10:14

Brazil	46–0	Mexico
Try: Nascimento 0'; Beltran (2) 2', 7'; M. Faria 4'; A. Faria (2) 6', 5'; Carvalho 2'; Gonçalves 7'; Con: A. Faria (2/3) 3', 5'; Braz (1/2) 2'	Report

Estadio Héroes de Curupayty
Referee: Armen Abi Saab (Uruguay)

16 August 2025
10:36

United States	48–0	Paraguay
Try: Edwards 2'; Tausinga (2) 4', 1'; Turagavou 6'; Almeida 2'; Henrich 3'; Fields (2) 5', 8'; Con: Henrich (1/3) 4'; Vogel (3/5) 1', 3', 8'	Report

Estadio Héroes de Curupayty
Referee: Laura Garcia (Colombia)

16 August 2025
15:14

Brazil	57–0	Paraguay
Try: Macedo (2) 0', 6'; A. Faria 3'; Braz 7'; Nascimento 0'; Fernandes 3'; Pereira 4'; Gonçalves 6'; Neves 7'; Con: A. Faria (3/4) 3', 7', 3'; Braz (2/2) 6', 0'; Pinheiro (1/1) 4'	Report

Estadio Héroes de Curupayty
Referee: Alexis Saari (United States)

16 August 2025
15:36

United States	39–0	Mexico
Try: Fields 1'; Almeida (2) 3', 7'; Vogel 5'; Liufau (2) 2', 7'; Larkin 5'; Con: Vogel (2/7) 2', 5'	Report

Estadio Héroes de Curupayty
Referee: Laura Garcia (Colombia)

16 August 2025
18:25

Mexico	27–0	Paraguay
Try: McRae (3) 2', 4', 7'; Rodriguez 6'; G. Hernandez 4'; Con: Rodriguez (1/4) 2'	Report

Estadio Héroes de Curupayty
Referee: Sebastian Toledo (Chile)

16 August 2025
18:47

United States	19–5	Brazil
Try: Wilfley 4'; Larkin (2) 6', 7'; Con: Vogel (2/2) 6', 7'	Report	Try: Beltran 4'

Estadio Héroes de Curupayty
Referee: Armen Abi Saab (Uruguay)

=== Fifth to eighth place classification ===
Semi-finals
17 August — 10:00 — Luque
Colombia	50
Paraguay	0
17 August — 10:25 — Luque
Mexico	10
Jamaica	5

Fifth Place
17 August — 16:20 — Luque
Colombia	30
Mexico	0
Seventh Place
17 August — 15:30 — Luque
Paraguay	5
Jamaica	39

==== 5–8th place semifinals ====
17 August 2025
10:00

Colombia	50–0	Paraguay
Try: Pino 1'; Tobón 3'; Henry 7'; Jiménez 1'; Rios 3'; Acalo 5'; Renteria (2) 7', 7'; Con: Jiménez (3/4) 1', 3', 7'; Pino (1/1) 3'; Acalo (1/3) 5'	Report

Estadio Héroes de Curupayty
Referee: Fernando García (Mexico)

17 August 2025
10:25

Mexico	10–5	Jamaica
Try: D. Hernandez 6'; G. Hernandez 3'	Report	Try: Papakirykos 0'

Estadio Héroes de Curupayty
Referee: Alexis Saari (United States)

==== Seventh place match ====
17 August 2025
15:30

Paraguay	5–39	Jamaica
Try: Cabrera 4'	Report	Try: Hunter (3) 2', 7', 1'; Osbourne (2) 5', 3'; Papakirykos (2) 5', 7'; Con: Hunter (2/7) 3', 6'

Estadio Héroes de Curupayty
Referee: Laura Garcia (Colombia)

==== Fifth place match ====
17 August 2025
16:20

Colombia	30–0	Mexico
Try: Rios 1'; Pino 4'; Renteria 7'; Córdoba (2) 3', 5'; Ruco 7'	Report

Estadio Héroes de Curupayty
Referee: Axel Cortazar (Paraguay)

=== Medal round ===
Semi-finals
17 August — 11:40 — Luque
Canada	7
Brazil	12
17 August — 12:05 — Luque
United States	19
Argentina	12

Final
17 August — 18:15 — Luque
Brazil	17
United States	7
Third Place
17 August — 17:10 — Luque
Canada	24
Argentina	0

==== Semifinals ====
17 August 2025
11:40

Canada	7–12	Brazil
Try: Stevenson 3'; Con: Douglas (1/1) 3'	Report	Try: M. Faria 2'; Braz 4'; Con: Braz (1/2) 4'

Estadio Héroes de Curupayty
Referee: Luca Solda (Argentina)

17 August 2025
12:05

United States	19–12	Argentina
Try: Liufau (2) 1', 3'; Henrich 1'; Con: Henrich (2/2) 1', 3'	Report	Try: Gervasio 5'; Pedalino 2'; Con: Ibañez (1/2) 5'

Estadio Héroes de Curupayty
Referee: Axel Cortazar (Paraguay)

==== Bronze medal match ====
17 August 2025
17:10

Canada	24–0	Argentina
Try: Pye 1'; Newsome 6'; Stevenson 2'; Poetker 7'; Con: Newsome (1/2) 7'; Douglas (1/1) 7'	Report

Estadio Héroes de Curupayty
Referee: Alexis Saari (United States)

==== Gold medal match ====
17 August 2025
18:15

Brazil	17–7	United States
Try: A. Faria (2) 2', 1'; Macedo 5'	Report	Try: Larkin 3'; Con: Vogel (1/1) 3'

Estadio Héroes de Curupayty
Referee: Luca Solda (Argentina)
