= Sudamérica Rugby Sevens =

Annual rugby sevens tournament

- Most recent season or competition: 2024 Sudamérica Rugby Sevens
- Sport: Rugby sevens
- Most recent champion: Chile (2024)
- Most titles: Argentina (10 titles)

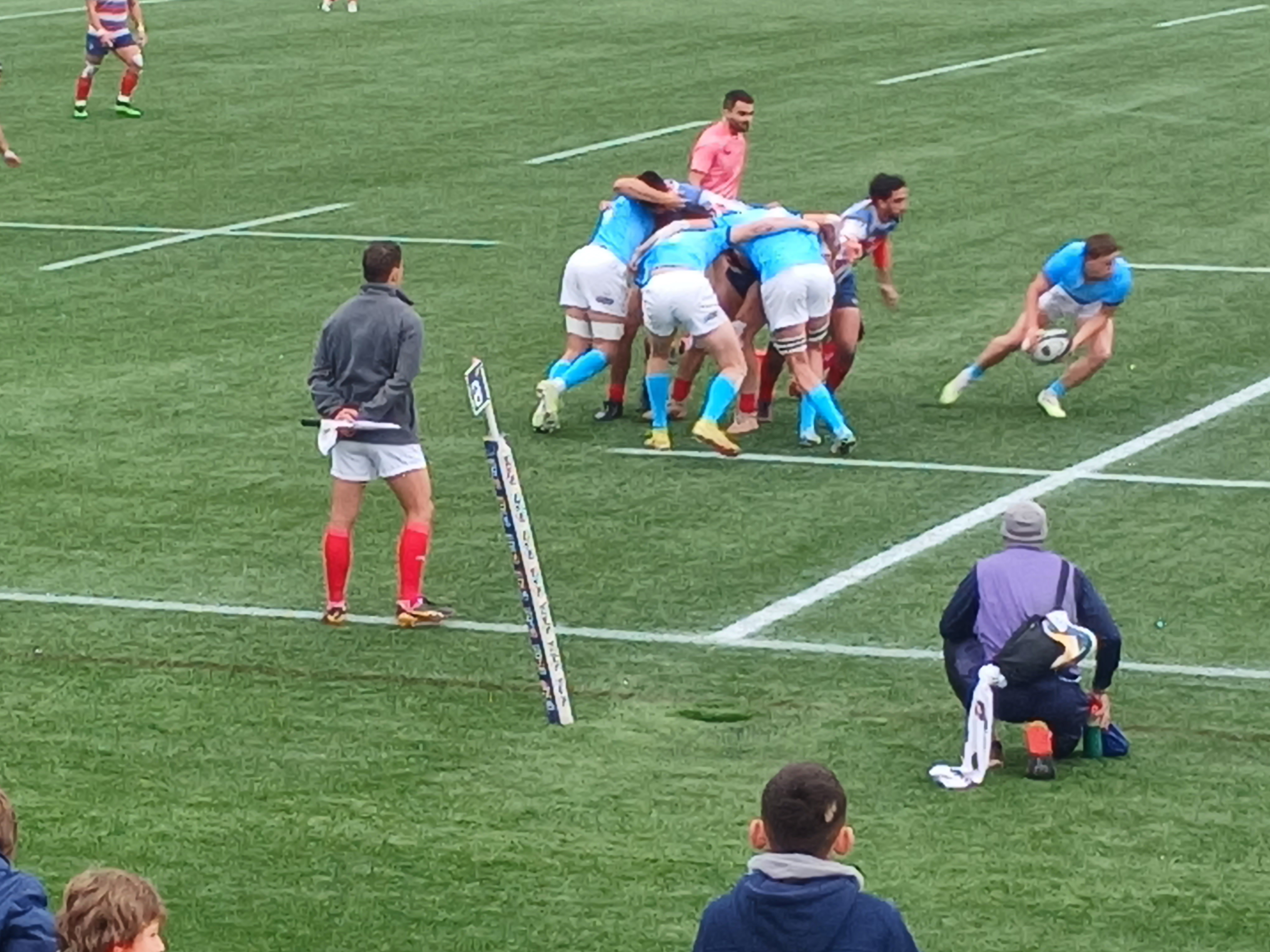
Paraguay vs Uruguay at the 2023 South American Sevens

Sudamérica Rugby Sevens, previously known as the CONSUR Sevens, is an annual rugby sevens tournament for national teams organized by Sudamérica Rugby. It was contested since 2006, and became a multi-tournament circuit starting with the 2017 incarnation.

== Results by year ==
CONSUR era

Year	Host locations	Champion	Runner Up	Third	Fourth
2006	Asunción	Argentina	Chile	Uruguay	Paraguay
2007	Viña del Mar	Argentina	Chile	Paraguay	Uruguay
2008	Punta del Este	Argentina	Uruguay	Chile	Brazil
2009	São José dos Campos	Argentina	Chile	Uruguay	Brazil
2010	Mar del Plata	Argentina	Uruguay	Chile	Brazil
2011	Bento Gonçalves	Argentina	Uruguay	Brazil	Chile
2012	Rio de Janeiro	Uruguay	Argentina	Chile	Paraguay
2013	Rio de Janeiro	Argentina	Uruguay	Brazil	Chile
2014	Santiago	Argentina	Uruguay	Chile	Brazil
2015	Santa Fe	Argentina	Uruguay	Chile	Colombia

Sudamérica era

Year	Host locations	Champion	Runner Up	Third	Fourth
2017	• Punta del Este • Viña del Mar	Fiji	Argentina	Chile	Uruguay
2018	• Punta del Este • Viña del Mar	(South Africa) SA 7s Academy	France	Uruguay	Chile
2019	• Punta del Este • Viña del Mar	Chile	Argentina	Portugal	Uruguay
2020	Valparaíso	Argentina	Brazil	Chile	Uruguay
2021	San José	Uruguay	Chile	Brazil	Peru
2022	San José	Chile	Argentina	Brazil	Paraguay
2023	Montevideo	Uruguay	Chile	Brazil	Colombia
2024	Lima	Chile	Brazil	Colombia	Paraguay

== Results by team ==
Summary of team placings up to and including 2018:

Team	Champions	Runners-up	Third	Fourth
Argentina	10 (list)	4 (2012, 2017, 2019, 2022)		
Uruguay	3 (2012, 2021, 2023)	6 (2008, 2010, 2011, 2013, 2014, 2015)	3 (2006, 2009, 2018)	3 (2007, 2017, 2019)
Chile	3 (2019, 2022, 2024)	5 (2006, 2007, 2009, 2021, 2023)	7 (2008, 2010, 2012, 2014, 2015, 2017, 2020)	3 (2011, 2013, 2018)
Fiji	1 (2017)			
(South Africa) SA 7's Academy	1 (2018)			
France		1 (2018)		
Brazil		2 (2020, 2024)	4 (2011, 2013, 2021, 2022, 2023)	4 (2008, 2009, 2010, 2014)
Paraguay			1 (2007)	3 (2006, 2012, 2022, 2024)
Colombia			1 (2024)	2 (2015, 2023)
Portugal			1 (2019)	
Peru				1 (2021)
