= Santa Teresa seven-a-side =

- Sport: Rugby sevens
- Founded: 1993
- Country: Venezuela

Santa Teresa seven-a-side is an annual club rugby sevens tournament in Venezuela. It is organised by the Fundación Santa Teresa and it has the support of the Venezuelan Rugby Federation. Venezuelan and foreign teams compete in the following categories: Men, Women and Junior (Under-18). The matches are played on a rugby pitch located at Hacienda Santa Teresa, a sugarcane plantation next to El Consejo, in Aragua State.

== History ==
The tournament was founded in 1993. It was originally organised by the Club de Rugby de la Universidad Metropolitana. Since 2008, Fundación Santa Teresa is in charge of the competition.

== Champions ==
Year	Men	Women	Junior
2012	Mérida Rugby Club	UCV Rugby Club	Proyecto Alcatraz Rugby Club
2013	Tigres de Cabimas Rugby Football Club	UCAB Rugby Club	Tracianos Rugby Club
2014	Mérida Rugby Club	Mérida Rugby Club	Proyecto Alcatraz Rugby Club
2015	Club de Rugby Caballeros de Mérida	UCV Rugby Club	Rinocerontes Rugby Club
2016	Club de Rugby Caballeros de Mérida	UCV Rugby Club	Cancillería de Colombia
2017	Proyecto Alcatraz Rugby Club	Panteras de Aragua	Proyecto Alcatraz Rugby Club

== See also ==
- Rugby union in Venezuela
