= 2017 Sudamérica Rugby Sevens =

Rugby Tournament

- Hosts: Colombia; Uruguay; Chile
- Date: 6–15 January 2017

The 2017 Sudamérica Rugby Sevens was the eleventh edition of the Sudamérica Rugby Sevens, the continental championship for rugby sevens in South America. One team qualified for the tournament through the SAR North Sevens.

Chile and Uruguay — as the top two finishing teams that are not already core teams on the Sevens World Series — qualified to the 2017 Hong Kong Sevens for a chance to earn core team status. Chile — as the top finishing non core team — qualified for the 2017 USA Sevens.

== Qualifying ==
Lower-ranked teams qualified through the Sudamérica Rugby North Sevens tournament, held in Guarne-Antioquia, Colombia from 8–9 July 2016

=== Group stage ===
Group A

Teams	Pld	W	D	L	PF	PA	+/−	Pts
Colombia	2	2	0	0	103	0	+103	6
Guatemala	2	1	0	1	26	50	-24	4
Costa Rica	2	0	0	2	7	86	-79	2

Guatemala	26-7	Costa Rica

Colombia	60-0	Costa Rica

Colombia	43-0	Guatemala

Group B

Teams	Pld	W	D	L	PF	PA	+/−	Pts
Ecuador	2	2	0	0	80	12	+68	6
Paraguay	2	1	0	1	68	17	+51	4
El Salvador	2	0	0	2	0	119	-119	2

Ecuador	17-12	Paraguay

Ecuador	63-0	El Salvador

Paraguay	56-0	El Salvador

Group C

Teams	Pld	W	D	L	PF	PA	+/−	Pts
Peru	2	2	0	0	66	7	+59	6
Venezuela	2	1	0	1	43	20	+23	4
Panama	2	0	0	2	0	82	-82	2

Peru	46-0	Panama

Venezuela	36-0	Panama

Peru	20-7	Venezuela

=== Knockout round ===
Semi-Finals

Colombia	28-5	Paraguay

Peru	20-19	Ecuador

Seventh Place Playoff

Costa Rica	20-12	Panama

Fifth Place Playoff

Venezuela	48-5	Guatemala

Third Place Playoff

Paraguay	57-5	Ecuador

Final

Colombia	35-5	Peru

=== Final standings ===
Legend
Qualified for Main Tournament.

Rank	Team
1st place, gold medalist(s)	Colombia
2nd place, silver medalist(s)	Peru
3rd place, bronze medalist(s)	Paraguay
4	Ecuador
5	Venezuela
6	Guatemala
7	Costa Rica
8	Panama
9	El Salvador

== Main Tournament ==
The main South America Sevens series will take place over two legs, one in Punta del Este, Uruguay, and one in Viña del Mar, Chile.

Unlike the other continental sevens championships, the South American Sevens invites countries from outside South America to participate. Fiji, United States, and Canada sent developmental teams.

=== Punta del Este Sevens ===
The Punta del Este Sevens was held at Campus de Maldonado, 6–7 January 2017

Group A

Teams	Pld	W	D	L	PF	PA	+/−	Pts
Fiji	3	3	0	0	107	7	+107	9
Chile	3	2	0	1	54	46	+8	7
Colombia	3	1	0	2	24	73	-55	5
Canada Maple Leafs	3	0	0	3	29	88	-59	3

Chile	19-17	Canada Maple Leafs

Fiji	33-0	Colombia

Colombia	19-12	Canada Maple Leafs

Fiji	24-7	Chile

Chile	28-5	Colombia

Fiji	50-0	Canada Maple Leafs

Group B

Teams	Pld	W	D	L	PF	PA	+/−	Pts
Argentina	3	3	0	0	93	14	+79	9
United States Falcons	3	2	0	1	43	53	-10	7
Uruguay	3	1	0	2	38	64	-26	5
Brazil	3	0	0	3	24	67	-43	3

United States Falcons	26-5	Uruguay

Argentina	24-7	Brazil

United States Falcons	17-10	Brazil

Argentina	31-7	Uruguay

Uruguay	26-7	Brazil

Argentina	50-0	United States Falcons

Knockout Stage

Cup

Quarter-finals
17:30 Jan 7
Chile	19
Uruguay	12
17:50 Jan 7
Argentina	26
Canada Maple Leafs	5
18:10 Jan 7
United States Falcons	14
Colombia	12
18:30 Jan 7
Fiji	31
Brazil	0

Semi-finals
Chile	0
Argentina	29
United States Falcons	0
Fiji	43

Final
Argentina	22
Fiji	21
Third place
Chile	19
United States Falcons	7

Plate

Semi-finals
Uruguay	17
Canada Maple Leafs	14
Colombia	19
Brazil	5

Final
Uruguay	24
Colombia	5
Third place
Canada Maple Leafs	14
Brazil	12

=== Viña del Mar Sevens ===
Group A

Teams	Pld	W	D	L	PF	PA	+/−	Pts
Argentina	3	3	0	0	79	12	67	9
Uruguay	3	2	0	1	43	44	-1	7
United States Falcons	3	1	0	2	24	45	-21	5
Brazil	3	0	0	3	19	64	-45	3

14 January 2017
13:20

Argentina	28-7	Brazil

14 January 2017
13:40

United States Falcons	12-14	Uruguay

14 January 2017
16:00

Argentina	25-5	Uruguay

14 January 2017
16:20

United States Falcons	12-5	Brazil

14 January 2017
19:10

Argentina	26-0	United States Falcons

14 January 2017
19:30

Uruguay	24-7	Brazil

Group B

Teams	Pld	W	D	L	PF	PA	+/−	Pts
Fiji	3	3	0	0	100	17	83	9
Chile	3	2	0	1	67	45	22	7
Canada Maple Leafs	3	1	0	2	50	72	-22	5
Colombia	3	0	0	3	17	100	-83	3

14 January 2017
14:00

Fiji	33-0	Canada Maple Leafs

14 January 2017
14:20

Chile	28-0	Colombia

14 January 2017
16:40

Fiji	36-5	Colombia

14 January 2017
17:00

Chile	27-14	Canada Maple Leafs

14 January 2017
19:50

Colombia	12-36	Canada Maple Leafs

14 January 2017
20:!0

Fiji	31-12	Chile

Knockout Stage

Cup

Quarter-finals
11:00 Jan 15
Argentina	19
Colombia	7
11:20 Jan 15
United States Falcons	10
Chile	26
11:40 Jan 15
Uruguay	5
Canada Maple Leafs	24
12:00 Jan 15
Brazil	0
Fiji	54

Semi-finals
14:20 Jan 15
Argentina	19
Chile	17
14:40 Jan 15
Fiji	29
Canada Maple Leafs	10

Final
18:10 Jan 15
Argentina	12
Fiji	19
Third place
17:20 Jan 15
Chile	28
Canada Maple Leafs	14

Plate

Semi-finals
13:40 Jan 15
Colombia	26
United States Falcons	14
14:00 Jan 15
Brazil	0
Uruguay	26

Final
17:00 Jan 15
Colombia	5
Uruguay	21
Third place
16:40 Jan 15
United States	14
Brazil	7

=== Final standings ===
Legend
Winner
Qualified to 2017 Hong Kong Sevens

Rank	Team	Punta del Este	Viña del Mar	Points
1st place, gold medalist(s)	Fiji	19	22	41
2nd place, silver medalist(s)	Argentina	22	19	41
3rd place, bronze medalist(s)	Chile	17	17	34
4	Uruguay	12	12	24
5	Canada Maple Leafs	8	15	23
6	United States Falcons	15	8	23
7	Colombia	10	10	20
8	Brazil	7	7	14
