= 2018 Sudamérica Rugby Sevens =

Rugby championship

- Hosts: Uruguay; Chile
- Date: 6–14 January 2018

The 2018 Sudamérica Rugby Sevens was the twelfth edition of the Sudamérica Rugby Sevens, the continental championship for rugby sevens in South America. Five national teams competed for two slots, not only for the 2018 Hong Kong Sevens qualification tournament, but also for participation at the 2018 Rugby World Cup Sevens.

== Teams ==
- Argentina (Note: Sudamérica member, but already qualified)
- Brazil
- Canada Maple Leafs (Note: Invitational Teams)
- Chile
- Colombia
- France
- Germany
- Ireland
- Paraguay (Note: Qualified by way of the 2017 Bolivarian Games tournament, from which they got second only to Chile)
- South Africa Academy
- United States Falcons
- Uruguay
- Notes:

== Final standings ==
Legend
Qualified to 2018 Hong Kong Sevens
and 2018 Rugby World Cup Sevens
Already qualified
Invitational Teams

Rank	Team	Punta Del Este	Viña del Mar	Points
1	South Africa Academy	22	22	44
2	France	17	19	36
3	Uruguay	15	15	30
4	Chile	19	8	27
5	Ireland	8	17	25
6	Germany	12	10	22
7	Argentina	7	12	19
8	Brazil	10	7	17
9	United States Falcons	3	5	8
10	Colombia	5	3	8
11	Canada Maple Leafs	2	2	4
12	Paraguay	1	1	2

== Main Tournament ==
The main South America Sevens series took place over two legs, one in Punta del Este, Uruguay, and one in Viña del Mar, Chile.

The initial seedings were as follows:

Seed	Team	2016-17 Ranking
1	South Africa	1st, World Sevens Series
2	United States	5th, World Sevens Series
3	Canada	8th, World Sevens Series
4	Argentina	9th, World Sevens Series
5	France	11th, World Sevens Series
6	Germany	Runner-up, Hong Kong Qualifier
7	Chile	Semifinalist, Hong Kong Qualifier
8	Uruguay	Quarterfinalist, Hong Kong Qualifier
9	Ireland	2nd, Sevens Grand Prix
10	Colombia	7th, Sudamérica
11	Brazil	8th, Sudamérica
12	Paraguay	Runner-up, 2017 Bolivarian Games

=== Punta del Este Sevens ===
All times Uruguay Standard Time (UTC−03:00)

Event	Winners	Score	Finalists	Semifinalists
Cup	South Africa Academy	21−5	Chile	France; Uruguay
5th place	Germany	24−12	Brazil	Ireland; Argentina
Challenge	Colombia	21−5	United States Falcons	Canada Maple Leafs; Paraguay

==== Pool Stage ====
Group A

Teams	Pld	W	D	L	PF	PA	+/−	Pts
Chile	3	3	0	0	73	34	+39	9
South Africa Academy	3	2	0	1	100	19	+81	7
Germany	3	1	0	2	71	73	−2	5
Paraguay	3	0	0	3	19	137	−118	3

6 January 2018
16:25

Germany	12−21	Chile

Estadio Domingo Burgueño, Maldonado

6 January 2018
16:47

South Africa Academy	45−0	Paraguay

Estadio Domingo Burgueño, Maldonado

6 January 2018
18:37

Germany	59−7	Paraguay

Estadio Domingo Burgueño, Maldonado

6 January 2018
18:59

South Africa Academy	10−19	Chile

Estadio Domingo Burgueño, Maldonado

6 January 2018
20:49

Chile	33−12	Paraguay

Estadio Domingo Burgueño, Maldonado

6 January 2018
21:11

South Africa Academy	45−0	Germany

Estadio Domingo Burgueño, Maldonado

Group B

Teams	Pld	W	D	L	PF	PA	+/−	Pts
Brazil	3	2	0	1	66	43	+23	7
Uruguay	3	2	0	1	62	41	+21	7
France	3	2	0	1	67	53	+14	7
United States Falcons	3	0	0	3	22	80	−58	3

6 January 2018
17:53

France	26−20	Brazil

Estadio Domingo Burgueño, Maldonado

6 January 2018
18:15

United States Falcons	12−22	Uruguay

Estadio Domingo Burgueño, Maldonado

6 January 2018
20:05

United States Falcons	5−29	France

Estadio Domingo Burgueño, Maldonado

6 January 2018
20:27

Uruguay	12−17	Brazil

Estadio Domingo Burgueño, Maldonado

6 January 2018
22:17

United States Falcons	5−29	Brazil

Estadio Domingo Burgueño, Maldonado

6 January 2018
22:39

France	12−28	Uruguay

Estadio Domingo Burgueño, Maldonado

Group C

Teams	Pld	W	D	L	PF	PA	+/−	Pts
Ireland	3	3	0	0	104	17	+87	9
Argentina	3	2	0	1	45	72	−27	7
Colombia	3	1	0	2	45	59	−14	5
Canada Maple Leafs	3	0	0	3	39	85	−46	3

6 January 2018
17:09

Argentina	5−38	Ireland

Estadio Domingo Burgueño, Maldonado

6 January 2018
17:31

Canada Maple Leafs	12−26	Colombia

Estadio Domingo Burgueño, Maldonado

6 January 2018
19:21

Argentina	14−12	Colombia

Estadio Domingo Burgueño, Maldonado

6 January 2018
19:43

Canada Maple Leafs	5−33	Ireland

Estadio Domingo Burgueño, Maldonado

6 January 2018
21:33

Ireland	33−7	Colombia

Estadio Domingo Burgueño, Maldonado

6 January 2018
21:55

Canada Maple Leafs	22−26	Argentina

Estadio Domingo Burgueño, Maldonado

==== Knockout round ====
Challenge Trophy

Semi-finals
7 January 2018 – 17:08 – Estadio Domingo Burgueño, Maldonado
Colombia	10
Paraguay	7
7 January 2018 – 17:30 – Estadio Domingo Burgueño, Maldonado
United States Falcons	31
Canada Maple Leafs	26

Final
7 January 2018 – 19:42 – Estadio Domingo Burgueño, Maldonado
Colombia	21
United States Falcons	5
Eleventh Place
7 January 2018 – 19:20 – Estadio Domingo Burgueño, Maldonado
Paraguay	7
Canada Maple Leafs	33

5th Place

Quarter-finals
7 January 2018 – 17:52 – Estadio Domingo Burgueño, Maldonado
Chile	17
Germany	10
7 January 2018 – 18:14 – Estadio Domingo Burgueño, Maldonado
Uruguay	17
Argentina	0
7 January 2018 – 18:36 – Estadio Domingo Burgueño, Maldonado
Brazil	12
France	28
7 January 2018 – 18:59 – Estadio Domingo Burgueño, Maldonado
Ireland	7
South Africa Academy	31

Semi-finals
7 January 2018 – 20:04 – Estadio Domingo Burgueño, Maldonado
Germany	24
Argentina	12
7 January 2018 – 20:26 – Estadio Domingo Burgueño, Maldonado
Brazil	17
Ireland	12

Final
7 January 2018 – 21:54 – Estadio Domingo Burgueño, Maldonado
Germany	24
Brazil	12
Seventh Place
7 January 2018 – 21:32 – Estadio Domingo Burgueño, Maldonado
Argentina	17
Ireland	21

Cup

Quarter-finals
7 January 2018 – 17:52 – Estadio Domingo Burgueño, Maldonado
Chile	17
Germany	10
7 January 2018 – 18:14 – Estadio Domingo Burgueño, Maldonado
Uruguay	17
Argentina	0
7 January 2018 – 18:36 – Estadio Domingo Burgueño, Maldonado
Brazil	12
France	28
7 January 2018 – 18:59 – Estadio Domingo Burgueño, Maldonado
Ireland	7
South Africa Academy	31

Semi-finals
7 January 2018 – 20:48 – Estadio Domingo Burgueño, Maldonado
Chile	17
Uruguay	14
7 January 2018 – 21:10 – Estadio Domingo Burgueño, Maldonado
France	14
South Africa Academy	24

Final
7 January 2018 – 22:38 – Estadio Domingo Burgueño, Maldonado
Chile	5
South Africa Academy	21
Third place
7 January 2018 – 22:16 – Estadio Domingo Burgueño, Maldonado
Uruguay	17
France	22

=== Viña del Mar Sevens ===
Event	Winners	Score	Finalists	Semifinalists
Cup	South Africa Academy	34−7	France	Ireland; Uruguay
5th place	Argentina	33−14	Germany	Chile; Brazil
Challenge	United States Falcons	14−12	Colombia	Canada Maple Leafs; Paraguay

All times in Chile Summer Time (UTC−03:00)

==== Pool Stage ====
Group A

Teams	Pld	W	D	L	PF	PA	+/−	Pts
Ireland	3	2	1	0	74	19	+55	8
Brazil	3	1	2	0	57	49	+8	7
South Africa Academy	3	1	1	1	48	31	+17	6
Paraguay	3	0	0	3	21	101	−80	3

13 January 2018
11:20

Brazil	14−14	Ireland

The Mackay School, Viña del Mar

13 January 2018
11:40

South Africa Academy	29−0	Paraguay

The Mackay School, Viña del Mar

13 January 2018
15:00

Brazil	29−21	Paraguay

The Mackay School, Viña del Mar

13 January 2018
15:00

South Africa Academy	5−17	Ireland

The Mackay School, Viña del Mar

13 January 2018
18:20

Ireland	43−0	Paraguay

The Mackay School, Viña del Mar

13 January 2018
18:40

South Africa Academy	14−14	Brazil

The Mackay School, Viña del Mar

Group B

Teams	Pld	W	D	L	PF	PA	+/−	Pts
Germany	3	3	0	0	63	43	+20	9
Chile	3	2	0	1	74	37	+37	7
Argentina	3	1	0	2	58	53	+5	5
Canada Maple Leafs	3	0	0	3	24	86	−62	2

13 January 2018
12:40

Germany	24−12	Argentina

The Mackay School, Viña del Mar

13 January 2018
13:00

Chile	38−0	Canada Maple Leafs

The Mackay School, Viña del Mar

13 January 2018
16:00

Germany	17−12	Canada Maple Leafs

The Mackay School, Viña del Mar

13 January 2018
16:20

Chile	17−15	Argentina

The Mackay School, Viña del Mar

13 January 2018
19:40

Argentina	31−12	Canada Maple Leafs

The Mackay School, Viña del Mar

13 January 2018
20:00

Chile	19−22	Germany

The Mackay School, Viña del Mar

Group C

Teams	Pld	W	D	L	PF	PA	+/−	Pts
Uruguay	3	3	0	0	51	40	+11	9
France	3	2	0	1	64	31	+33	7
United States Falcons	3	1	0	2	45	67	−22	5
Colombia	3	0	0	3	38	60	−22	3

13 January 2018
12:00

Uruguay	17−14	Colombia

The Mackay School, Viña del Mar

13 January 2018
12:20

France	33−7	United States Falcons

The Mackay School, Viña del Mar

13 January 2018
15:20

Uruguay	17−12	United States Falcons

The Mackay School, Viña del Mar

13 January 2018
15:40

France	17−7	Colombia

The Mackay School, Viña del Mar

13 January 2018
19:00

Colombia	17−26	United States Falcons

The Mackay School, Viña del Mar

13 January 2018
19:20

France	14−17	Uruguay

The Mackay School, Viña del Mar

==== Knockout round ====
Challenge Trophy

Semi-finals
14 January 2018 – 11:10 – The Mackay School, Viña del Mar
United States Falcons	36
Paraguay	10
14 January 2018 – 11:30 – The Mackay School, Viña del Mar
Canada Maple Leafs	5
Colombia	19

Final
14 January 2018 – 17:40 – The Mackay School, Viña del Mar
United States Falcons	14
Colombia	12
Eleventh Place
14 January 2018 – 17:20 – The Mackay School, Viña del Mar
Canada Maple Leafs	43
Paraguay	5

5th Place

Quarter-finals
14 January 2018 – 12:10 – The Mackay School, Viña del Mar
Germany	12
South Africa Academy	26
14 January 2018 – 12:30 – The Mackay School, Viña del Mar
Uruguay	14
Brazil	7
14 January 2018 – 11:50 – The Mackay School, Viña del Mar
Ireland	7
Argentina	5
14 January 2018 – 12:50 – The Mackay School, Viña del Mar
Chile	7
France	14

Semi-finals
14 January 2018 – 14:30 – The Mackay School, Viña del Mar
Germany	12
Brazil	5
14 January 2018 – 14:50 – The Mackay School, Viña del Mar
Argentina	14
Chile	7

Final
14 January 2018 – 18:40 – The Mackay School, Viña del Mar
Germany	14
Argentina	33
Seventh Place
14 January 2018 – 18:00 – The Mackay School, Viña del Mar
Brazil	12
Chile	26

Cup

Quarter-finals
14 January 2018 – 12:10 – The Mackay School, Viña del Mar
Germany	12
South Africa Academy	26
14 January 2018 – 12:30 – The Mackay School, Viña del Mar
Uruguay	14
Brazil	7
14 January 2018 – 11:50 – The Mackay School, Viña del Mar
Ireland	7
Argentina	5
14 January 2018 – 12:50 – The Mackay School, Viña del Mar
Chile	7
France	14

Semi-finals
14 January 2018 – 15:10 – The Mackay School, Viña del Mar
South Africa Academy	26
Uruguay	7
14 January 2018 – 15:30 – The Mackay School, Viña del Mar
Ireland	12
France	15

Final
14 January 2018 – 19:50 – The Mackay School, Viña del Mar
South Africa Academy	34
France	7
Third place
14 January 2018 – 19:00 – The Mackay School, Viña del Mar
Uruguay	5
Ireland	12

== See also ==
- 2018 Rugby World Cup Sevens qualifying – Men
