= FVR (disambiguation) =

FVR refers to Fidel Valdez Ramos (1928–2022), the 12th President of the Philippines (1992–1998).

FVR may also refer to:

- Feline viral rhinotracheitis
- Finavera Wind Energy, a Canadian energy company
- Finn Valley Railway, in Ireland
- Free voluntary reading
- Fur language
- FV Ravensburg, a German football club
- Rhineland Football Association (German: Fussball-Verband Rheinland)
- Venezuelan Rugby Federation (Spanish: Federación Venezolana de Rugby)
