= Campeonato Nacional de Clubes (Venezuela) =

Rugby union tournament in Venezuela

- Sport: Rugby union
- Founded: 1976
- Country: Venezuela
- Most recent champion: Proyecto Alcatraz Rugby Club
- Most titles: Club de Rugby de la Universidad Metropolitana (8 titles)

The Campeonato Nacional de Clubes (National Championship of Clubs) is an annual rugby union tournament contested by men's clubs in Venezuela. It is organised by the Venezuelan Rugby Federation. The competition began in 1976 with a match between the teams Rugby Club Caracas and Anaucos Rugby Club. Rugby Club Caracas won the match and became the champion in that year.

== Format ==
The championship has two stages: a group stage and a knockout stage. In the group stage, the teams are divided into geographical zones. Each team plays two matches against each of the other teams in the same group. The top two clubs of each zone qualify to the knockout stage. The knockout stage comprises three rounds of matches: quarter-finals, semi-finals, and the final.

== Champions ==
Year	Club	City
1976	Rugby Club Caracas	Caracas
1977	Anaucos Rugby Club	Caracas
1978	Rugby Club Caracas	Caracas
1981	Club de Rugby de la Universidad Simón Bolívar	Caracas
1982	Club de Rugby de la Universidad Simón Bolívar	Caracas
1983	Club de Rugby de la Universidad Simón Bolívar	Caracas
1984	Rugby Club Caracas	Caracas
1985	Anaucos Rugby Club	Caracas
1986		
1987	Rugby Club Caracas	Caracas
1988	Club de Rugby de la Universidad Simón Bolívar	Caracas
1989	Osos Rugby Club	Caracas
1990	Arlequines	
1991	Arlequines	
1992	Club de Rugby de la Universidad Metropolitana	Caracas
1993	Club de Rugby de la Universidad Metropolitana	Caracas
1994	Club de Rugby de la Universidad Metropolitana	Caracas
1995	Club de Rugby de la Universidad Metropolitana	Caracas
1996	Club de Rugby de la Universidad Metropolitana	Caracas
1997	Club de Rugby de la Universidad Metropolitana	Caracas
1998		
1999	Club de Rugby de la Universidad Metropolitana	Caracas
2000	Arcos Rugby Club	Caracas
2001	Club de Rugby de la Universidad Metropolitana	Caracas
2002	Arcos Rugby Club	Caracas
2003	Arcos Rugby Club	Caracas
2004	Arcos Rugby Club	Caracas
2005	Arcos Rugby Club	Caracas
2006	Club de Rugby Caballeros de Mérida	Mérida
2007	Arcos Rugby Club	Caracas
2008	Club de Rugby Caballeros de Mérida	Mérida
2009	Maracaibo Rugby Football Club	Maracaibo
2010	Club de Rugby Caballeros de Mérida	Mérida
2011	Club de Rugby Caballeros de Mérida	Mérida
2012	Club de Rugby Caballeros de Mérida	Mérida
2013	Club de Rugby Caballeros de Mérida	Mérida
2014	Club de Rugby Caballeros de Mérida	Mérida
2015	Proyecto Alcatraz Rugby Club	El Consejo
2016	Proyecto Alcatraz Rugby Club	El Consejo
2017	Proyecto Alcatraz Rugby Club	El Consejo

== See also ==
- Rugby union in Venezuela
