= 2011 CONSUR Sevens =

2011 CONSUR Sevens tournament
2011 CONSUR Sevens tournament

Tournament details
- Host country: Brazil
- Dates: 5 February – 6 February
- Teams: 8 (from 1 confederation)
- Venue: 1 (in Bento Gonçalves, Brazil host cities)

The 2011 CONSUR Sevens tournament was a rugby sevens competition for national teams from the Confederación Sudamericana de Rugby. The tournament was held in Bento Gonçalves, Brazil from 5 February to 6 February.

Brazil qualified for the 2011 Pan American Games, to be held in Guadalajara joining already qualified Argentina, Chile and Uruguay.

== Teams ==
- Argentina
- Brazil (hosts)
- Chile
- Colombia
- Paraguay
- Peru
- Uruguay
- Venezuela

== Men's tournament ==
=== Zone A ===
Team	Pld	W	D	L	PF	PA	PD	Pts
Brazil	3	3	0	0	62	17	+45	9
Argentina	3	2	0	1	83	12	+71	6
Paraguay	3	1	0	2	22	55	–43	3
Peru	3	0	0	3	12	95	–83	0

5 February 2011
15:24

Brazil	19 – 10	Paraguay

Bento Gonçalves, Brazil

5 February 2011
16:00

Argentina	47 – 5	Peru

Bento Gonçalves, Brazil

5 February 2011
18:20

Brazil	36 – 7	Peru

Bento Gonçalves, Brazil

5 February 2011
18:40

Argentina	36 – 0	Paraguay

Bento Gonçalves, Brazil

5 February 2011
21:00

Paraguay	12 – 0	Peru

Bento Gonçalves, Brazil

5 February 2011
21:20

Brazil	7 – 0	Argentina

Bento Gonçalves, Brazil

=== Zone B ===
Team	Pld	W	D	L	PF	PA	PD	Pts
Chile	3	3	0	0	88	19	+69	9
Uruguay	3	2	0	1	83	26	+57	6
Colombia	3	1	0	2	33	67	–34	3
Venezuela	3	0	0	3	17	109	–92	0

5 February 2011
13:30

Chile	36 – 0	Colombia

Bento Gonçalves, Brazil

5 February 2011
14:00

Uruguay	43 – 7	Venezuela

Bento Gonçalves, Brazil

5 February 2011
17:00

Chile	33 – 5	Venezuela

Bento Gonçalves, Brazil

5 February 2011
17:20

Uruguay	26 – 0	Colombia

Bento Gonçalves, Brazil

5 February 2011
19:40

Colombia	33 – 5	Venezuela

Bento Gonçalves, Brazil

5 February 2011
20:00

Uruguay	14 – 19	Chile

Bento Gonçalves, Brazil

==== Placement 5th–8th ====
6 February 2011
10:30

Paraguay	24 – 7	Venezuela

Bento Gonçalves, Brazil

6 February 2011
10:50

Colombia	26 – 5	Peru

Bento Gonçalves, Brazil

==== 7th–8th ====
6 February 2011
12:50

Venezuela	0 – 40	Peru

Bento Gonçalves, Brazil

==== Bowl Final ====
6 February 2011
13:30

Paraguay	19 – 7	Colombia

Bento Gonçalves, Brazil

=== Final round ===
Semifinal
6 February – Bento Gonçalves
Brazil	5
Uruguay	7
6 February – Bento Gonçalves
Argentina	15
Chile	10

Final
6 February – Bento Gonçalves
Uruguay	21
Argentina	26
Third place
6 February – Bento Gonçalves
Brazil	17
Chile	12

==== Semifinals ====
6 February 2011
11:50

Brazil	5 – 7	Uruguay

Bento Gonçalves, Brazil

6 February 2011
12:10

Chile	10 – 15	Argentina

Bento Gonçalves, Brazil

==== Plate Final ====
6 February 2011
14:25

Brazil	17 – 12	Chile

Bento Gonçalves, Brazil

==== Cup Final ====
6 February 2011
15:20

Uruguay	21 – 26	Argentina

Bento Gonçalves, Brazil

=== Final standing ===
Rank	Team
Gold medal	Argentina
Silver medal	Uruguay
Bronze medal	Brazil
4	Chile
5	Paraguay
6	Colombia
7	Peru
8	Venezuela

== Women's tournament ==
=== Zone A ===
Team	Pld	W	D	L	PF	PA	PD	Pts
Brazil	3	3	0	0	99	7	+92	9
Argentina	3	2	0	1	82	19	+63	6
Venezuela	3	1	0	2	17	79	–62	3
Paraguay	3	0	0	3	0	93	–93	0

5 February 2011
14:28

Argentina	43 – 0	Venezuela

Bento Gonçalves, Brazil

5 February 2011
14:56

Brazil	44 – 0	Paraguay

Bento Gonçalves, Brazil

5 February 2011
17:40

Argentina	32 – 0	Paraguay

Bento Gonçalves, Brazil

5 February 2011
18:00

Brazil	36 – 0	Venezuela

Bento Gonçalves, Brazil

5 February 2011
20:20

Venezuela	17 – 0	Paraguay

Bento Gonçalves, Brazil

5 February 2011
20:40

Brazil	19 – 7	Argentina

Bento Gonçalves, Brazil

=== Zone B ===
Team	Pld	W	D	L	PF	PA	PD	Pts
Chile	3	2	1	0	34	17	+17	7
Uruguay	3	2	0	1	55	15	+40	6
Colombia	3	1	1	1	22	34	–12	4
Peru	3	0	0	3	12	57	–45	0

5 February 2011
12:50

Uruguay	5 – 10	Chile

Bento Gonçalves, Brazil

5 February 2011
13:10

Colombia	12 – 5	Peru

Bento Gonçalves, Brazil

5 February 2011
16:20

Uruguay	26 – 0	Peru

Bento Gonçalves, Brazil

5 February 2011
16:40

Colombia	5 – 5	Chile

Bento Gonçalves, Brazil

5 February 2011
19:00

Chile	19 – 7	Peru

Bento Gonçalves, Brazil

5 February 2011
19:20

Colombia	5 – 24	Uruguay

Bento Gonçalves, Brazil

==== Placement 5th–8th ====
6 February 2011
09:50

Venezuela	0 – 31	Peru

Bento Gonçalves, Brazil

6 February 2011
10:10

Colombia	31 – 0	Paraguay

Bento Gonçalves, Brazil

==== 7th–8th ====
6 February 2011
12:30

Venezuela	36 – 0	Paraguay

Bento Gonçalves, Brazil

==== Bowl Final ====
6 February 2011
13:10

Peru	0 – 15	Colombia

Bento Gonçalves, Brazil

=== Final round ===
Semifinal
6 February – Bento Gonçalves
Brazil	5
Uruguay	0
6 February – Bento Gonçalves
Argentina	19
Chile	0

Final
6 February – Bento Gonçalves
Brazil	32
Argentina	5
Third place
6 February – Bento Gonçalves
Uruguay	10
Chile	15

==== Semifinals ====
6 February 2011
11:10

Brazil	5 – 0	Uruguay

Bento Gonçalves, Brazil

6 February 2011
11:30

Chile	0 – 19	Argentina

Bento Gonçalves, Brazil

==== Plate Final ====
6 February 2011
14:00

Uruguay	10 – 15	Chile

Bento Gonçalves, Brazil

==== Cup Final ====
6 February 2011
14:50

Brazil	32 – 5	Argentina

Bento Gonçalves, Brazil

=== Final standing ===
Rank	Team
Gold medal	Brazil
Silver medal	Argentina
Bronze medal	Chile
4	Uruguay
5	Colombia
6	Peru
7	Venezuela
8	Paraguay
