= José Rafael Revenga Municipality =

José Rafael Revenga Municipality Municipio José Rafael Revenga
- Municipality
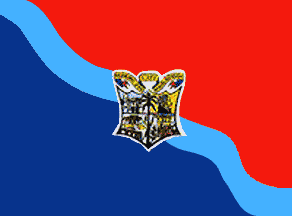
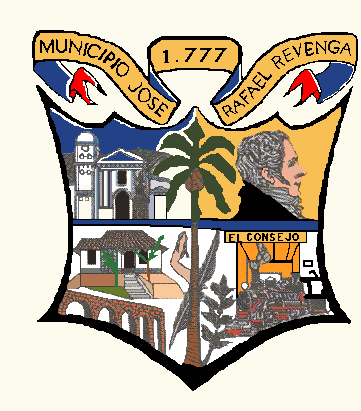
- Flag Coat of arms

- Location in Aragua

- Location in Venezuela
- Coordinates: 10°15′06″N 67°14′37″W
- Country: Venezuela
- State: Aragua
- Municipal seat: El Consejo

Government
  - Mayor: Daniel Perdomo Briceño (PSUV)

Area
  - Total: 175.6 km^{2} (67.8 sq mi)

Population (2011)
  - Total: 48,800
  - Density: 278/km^{2} (720/sq mi)
- Time zone: UTC−4 (VET)
- Area code(s): 0244
- Website: Official website

The José Rafael Revenga Municipality is one of the 18 municipalities (municipios) that makes up the Venezuelan state of Aragua and, according to the 2011 census by the National Institute of Statistics of Venezuela, the municipality has a population of 48,800. The town of El Consejo is the shire town of the José Rafael Revenga Municipality. The municipality is named for José Rafael Revenga.

== Demographics ==
The José Rafael Revenga Municipality, according to a 2007 population estimate by the National Institute of Statistics of Venezuela, has a population of 49,593 (up from 43,513 in 2000). This amounts to 3% of the state's population. The municipality's population density is 258.3 inhabitants per square kilometre (669/sq mi).

== Government ==
The mayor of the José Rafael Revenga Municipality is Francisco Martínez, elected on November 23, 2008, with 60% of the vote. He replaced Juan Pablo Perdomo Piñero shortly after the elections. The municipality is divided into one parish; Capital José Rafael Revenga.
