= 2024 Sudamérica Rugby Sevens =

- Host nation: Peru
- Date: 26–27 October 2024

Cup
- Champion: Chile
- Runner-up: Brazil
- Third: Colombia

Tournament details
- Matches played: 20

The 2024 Sudamérica Rugby Sevens is the 18th edition of the tournament and is held from 26 to 27 October 2024 at the Villa María del Triunfo Sports Center at Villa María del Triunfo in Lima, Peru.

== Teams ==
Eight teams compete in the tournament.

- Brazil
- Chile
- Colombia
- Costa Rica
- Guatemala
- Paraguay
- Peru
- Uruguay
- Venezuela

== Pool stage ==
=== Pool A ===
Team	W	D	L	PF	PA	PD	Pts
Chile	3	0	0	151	0	+151	9
Paraguay	2	0	1	62	39	+23	7
Peru	1	0	2	41	82	–41	5
Guatemala	0	0	3	5	138	–133	3

26 October
09:58

Chile	64–0	Guatemala

Villa María del Triunfo Sports Center, Lima

26 October
10:20

Paraguay	24–5	Peru

Villa María del Triunfo Sports Center, Lima

26 October
12:54

Chile	53–0	Peru

Villa María del Triunfo Sports Center, Lima

26 October
13:16

Paraguay	38–0	Guatemala

Villa María del Triunfo Sports Center, Lima

26 October
15:50

Peru	36–5	Guatemala

Villa María del Triunfo Sports Center, Lima

26 October
16:12

Chile	34–0	Paraguay

Villa María del Triunfo Sports Center, Lima

=== Pool B ===
Team	W	D	L	PF	PA	PD	Pts
Brazil	3	0	0	115	12	+103	9
Colombia	2	0	1	102	31	+71	7
Venezuela	1	0	2	46	74	–28	5
Costa Rica	0	0	3	0	146	–146	3

26 October
10:42

Brazil	48–0	Costa Rica

Villa María del Triunfo Sports Center, Lima

26 October
11:04

Colombia	38–0	Venezuela

Villa María del Triunfo Sports Center, Lima

26 October
13:38

Brazil	36–5	Venezuela

Villa María del Triunfo Sports Center, Lima

26 October
14:00

Colombia	57–0	Costa Rica

Villa María del Triunfo Sports Center, Lima

26 October
16:34

Brazil	31–7	Colombia

Villa María del Triunfo Sports Center, Lima

26 October
16:56

Venezuela	41–0	Costa Rica

Villa María del Triunfo Sports Center, Lima

== Knockout stage ==
=== 5th place ===
5th place semifinals
27 October – 09:50
Peru	29
Costa Rica	0
27 October – 10:15
Venezuela	55
Guatemala	0

5th place final
27 October – 14:05
Peru	5
Venezuela	29
7th place final
27 October – 13:15
Costa Rica	5
Guatemala	12

=== Cup ===
Cup semifinals
27 October – 11:30
Chile	29
Colombia	12
27 October – 11:55
Brazil	36
Paraguay	0

Cup final
27 October – 15:45
Chile	19
Brazil	5
3rd place final
27 October – 14:55
Colombia	45
Paraguay	12

== Standings ==
Legend
	Qualified for 2025 Challenger Series

Rank	Team
1st place, gold medalist(s)	Chile
2nd place, silver medalist(s)	Brazil
3rd place, bronze medalist(s)	Colombia
4	Paraguay
5	Venezuela
6	Peru
7	Guatemala
8	Costa Rica
