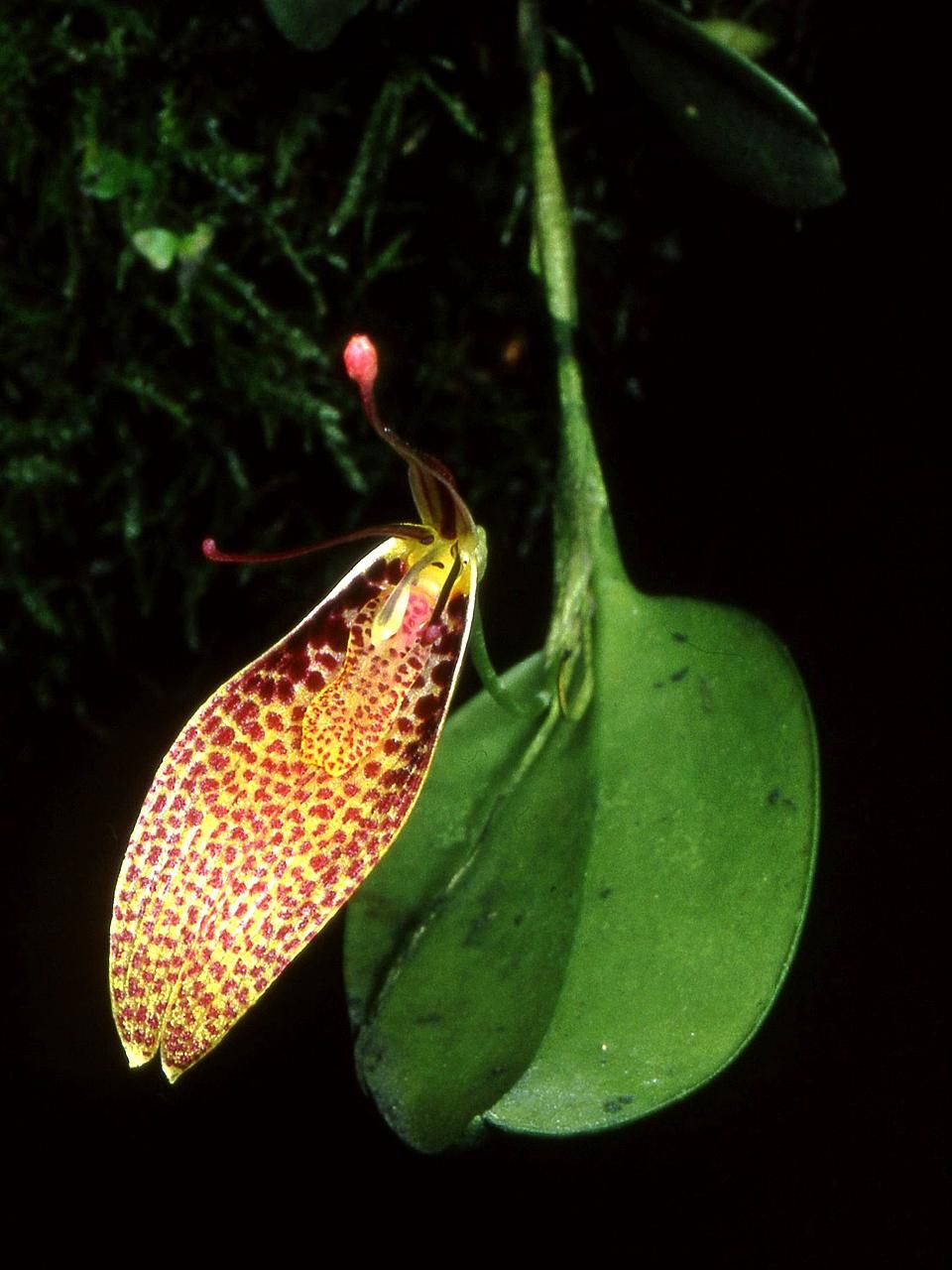
- Flower of Restrepia guttulata

Scientific classification
- Kingdom: Plantae
- Clade: Tracheophytes
- Clade: Angiosperms
- Clade: Monocots
- Order: Asparagales
- Family: Orchidaceae
- Subfamily: Epidendroideae
- Genus: Restrepia
- Species: R. guttulata

Binomial name
- Restrepia guttulata Lindl.

Synonyms
- Restrepia robledorum Braas & Braem; Restrepia maculata ssp. robledorum (Braas & Braem) H.Mohr

= Restrepia guttulata =

Species of orchid

Restrepia guttulata, commonly called the small-spotted restrepia, is a species of orchid occurring from Venezuela to Ecuador.

== Introduction ==
Restrepia guttulata, commonly known as the small spotted restripia, is an epiphytic orchid in the family Orchidaceae. It is native to the South American Andes and Sierra Nevada de Santa Marta mountain ranges in Colombia, Ecuador, and Venezuela. It belongs to one of the largest subtribes in the orchid family, the Pleurothallidinae. As the common name suggests, the flowers of this orchid are ornamented with spots or specks. Flowers are multicoloured, ranging from white, pink, purple, yellow, orange, burgundy, and brown. There is circumstantial evidence to support that flies act as pollinators to Restrepia guttulata. Conservation of this orchid is crucial, as it is considered endangered or vulnerable in most of its range. It is thought to have been extirpated entirely from Venezuela, now being considered extinct in the wild there. This is due to habitat loss and fragmentation. This has also caused serious declines in R. guttulata’s ability to cross pollinate with other members of its species. Ex situ conservation, which is any conservation effort which harbours plant material away from its native habitat, is crucial for such endangered orchids as Restrepia guttulata.

== Description ==
Like many orchids, Restrepia guttulata is a herbaceous, epiphytic plant, growing on other plant surfaces like branches and stems. Its vegetative body is small and grows in clusters or tufts. It grows to 30 cm in height and has erect rigid leaves that are leathery in appearance and texture. Leaves are elliptic or ovate in shape with a cuneate base and acute apex. Leaves generally grow to 6 by 3 cm and up to 8 by 3 cm. The leaf margin, or edge, is sharp. The midvein is recessed into the leaf blade, creating a conspicuous channel down the centre of the leaf. This causes the leaf to resemble the bottom of a boat, and is thus termed a keeled leaf. The stems are 11 cm in length and covered in white papery sheaths ornamented in dark brown spots near the base.

R. guttulata’s flowers grow solitarily and successively upon a thin, light green, up to 7 cm peduncle. The leaves are twisted such that flowers emerge and are positioned behind the leaf. Flowers consist of a purple ovary, a free dorsal sepal, translucent petals, an oblong lip, fused sepals, a column, and male and female reproductive organs. Sepals are membranous and translucent to white, purple, pink, or yellow and ornamented with purple to pink markings and a purple to brown or yellow midvein. The dorsal sepal is 24 by 3mm in size and has a fleshy pink apex. The lateral sepals are almost entirely fused, with a small part near the tip. This fused lamina is 23 by 10mm in size. The lamina's apex is truncate or retuse due to the splitting of the sepals. It is green to yellow, pink, and/or light orange/brown in colour. It is ornamented with purple, pink, and/or burgundy spots or specks. Spots begin heavy and round at the base of the lip and gradually become finer near the apex. Petals are membranous and translucent with purple veins along the entire length, from the apex to the base. They are 13 by 1mm in size with minutely serrated margins. The coloration of the petals is the same as the dorsal sepal, and also shares the characteristic of having a fleshy apex. The lip is up to 10mm in length with a light brown coloration and patterned in pink spots. The column is off-white to cream coloured and has a burgundy coloured portion near the base on the underside. The anther is cream coloured and the four pollinia attached to it are yellow and hard.

R. guttulata has been observed flowering in January, March, May, August, and December. Upon flowering, the individuals of the species require pollen from another individual to achieve successful pollination and seed production. This reproductive strategy, known as self-incompatibility, was confirmed to be a shared characteristic in the genus Restrepia by a 2015 study. Pollination is thought to occur with the help of flies. The subtribe Pleurothallidinae in which R. guttulata is situated has been described as a fly pollinated group as a whole and some studies have shown evidence of pollination in Restrepia. This evidence includes the presence of appendages called osmophores which help to guide the fly into the flower as well as the production of fly attracting aminoid fragrances.

== Etymology ==
The genus Restrepia is named in honour of the Colombian politician and historian, Don José Restrepo, who was also an early investigator of the flora of his home county. The specific epithet of Restrepia guttulata comes from the adjective guttate, meaning “in the form of drops; furnished with drops." which originates from the latin ‘guttātus’ meaning spotted or speckled. This refers to the conspicuous spotted lip and fused sepals of the flower.

== Habitat and Ecology ==
Restrepia guttulata grows in cold and humid cloud forest habitats at elevations of 1700 to 2800 metres above sea level. In Venezuela, R. guttulata has been recorded growing at 1200 metres in open trees in the forest near the city of El Consejo. Its adult lifespan, including germination from seed, vegetative growth, flowering, and reproduction, occurs on branches or otherwise situated in aerial habitats in the forest canopy. The production of tiny, dust-like seeds enables wind powered seed dispersal. Seeds fly away from their parent plant on the wind before coming to rest on a suitable branch to grow.

== Distribution ==
R. guttulata’s native range spans across Colombia, Ecuador, and Venezuela. The species grows in the Andes and Sierra Nevada de Santa Marta mountain ranges. It is found in the Colombian departments of Antioquia, Caldas, Cuaca, Chocó, Cundinamarca, Magdalena, Santander, and Tolima.

== Systematics ==
Restrepia guttulata is an early discovered species in the genus Restrepia, having been first described in the early 1800s. The species resides in the family Orchidaceae, one of the most species rich plant families on earth. Within this family, the Restrepia genus is situated in the Epidendroideae subfamily, Epidendreae tribe, and Pleurothallidinae subtribe. A comprehensive overview of the subtribe and genus was published in 1986, however, this does not include more recently recognized species which are closely related to R. guttulata. A complete, up to date monograph of Restrepia is thus needed to reflect these new additions to the genus.

The genus Restrepia is united in a common flower architecture and appearance as well as in their pollination methods. They share in common non-nectar rewarding flowers, fly pollination, and a reproductive strategy of obligate outbreeding, meaning they cannot self pollinate. The phylogenetic history of the Restrepia genus has yet to be fully realised. The evolutionary relationships between R. guttulata and other constituents of the Pleurothallidinae subtribe have also yet to be fully reconstructed. One study carried out genetic analysis of Restrepia guttulata’s plastid gene ycf1 and DNA region matK and showed two possible evolutionary trajectories. The ycf1 region analysis resulted in R. guttulata being placed as sister to Restrepiopsis norae, another orchid species in the subtribe Pleurothallidinae. The clade containing these two species was shown to be sister to a clade comprising Dresslerella portillae and Barbosella cucullata. The matK analysis and resulting phylogenetic tree placed R. guttulata as sister to a clade containing Dresslerella portillae, Barbosella cucullata, and Restrepiopsis norae. Bootstrap support was stronger for the tree constructed with the plastic gene analysis, suggesting this relationship more closely reflects true evolutionary history. This study considered genetic material from only from representative species from genera within Pleurothallidinae, and thus a full understanding of these genera’s relationships to one another cannot be gleaned. A 2021 study considered plastid genes from a much broader array of species from Pleurothallidinae species and reconstructed a phylogeny placing Restrepia as sister to Barbosella and this clade as sister to Dresslerella. Further phylogenetic study is needed to fully understand the relationships of Restrepia species to one another, as well as the genus’ relationship to other genera in the subtribe. The subtribe Pleurothallidinae has evolved at a rapid pace over a short period of geological time. Some 5000 species have radiated into biogeographical regions spanning across the America tropics. Restrepia guttulata represents just one of these successful radiations into numerous varied habitats.

== Conservation ==
Small-spotted restrepia and the fifty six other species of Restrepia face extinction due to the combination of habitat destruction, deforestation, and obligate out-breeding reproduction. Their inability to self pollinate combined with habitat fragmentation could potentially cause a serious decline or altogether cessation of successful reproduction. A major driver of habitat loss for Restrepia has been the construction of the Pan American highway. It has allowed increased access to previously undisturbed areas and thus permitted new land use change and increased habitat fragmentation. Sites with recorded Restrepia occurrence have suffered a 28% decrease in Colombia, 36% in Ecuador, and 45% loss in Venezuela. Considering these losses, it is unsurprising that in Venezuela R. guttulata as well as two other Restrepia species are considered extinct. In neighbouring Colombia, R. guttulata is categorised as endangered. In Ecuador, the species is considered vulnerable.

Conservation efforts are needed to prevent small-spotted restrepia from becoming extinct in its native range. Sites of conservation importance in Colombia have been determined based on high levels of endemic orchids, known as Sites of Special Importance for the Conservation of Threatened Orchid Species in Colombia (SSICO). Ex situ cultivation and storage strategies are crucial in conservation efforts, and include micropropagation, tissue culture, seed banking, and living collections. Together, these methods are utilised to safeguard Restrepia species from extinction. These collections represent a genetic backup and may be used to augment, or add to wild populations, in areas where their numbers have become severely declined.

As with most orchids, R. guttulata is classified under CITES appendix II, which legally restricts international trade. Species protected under appendix II include those which are not necessarily currently at risk of extinction but could be in the future, as well as so-called “look-alike species”. These are species which are difficult to differentiate from rare, seriously threatened species.

== Trade and Uses ==
The uses of R. guttulata include trade as an ornamental by collectors and orchid enthusiasts.
