= 2015 CONSUR Sevens =

- Hosts: Argentina
- Date: 5–7 June
- Nations: Argentina; Chile; Colombia; Paraguay; Peru; Uruguay; Venezuela

Final positions
- Champions: Argentina
- Runners-up: Uruguay
- Third: Chile

The 2015 CONSUR Men's Sevens championship was an Olympic qualification tournament for rugby sevens at the 2016 Summer Olympics which was held in Santa Fe, Argentina on 5-7 June 2015. It was the tenth edition of the CONSUR Sevens. The tournament used a round-robin format, with the winners (Argentina) qualifying directly to the Olympics, and the second and third place teams (Uruguay and Chile respectively) qualifying for the Final Olympic Qualification Tournament.

== Round-Robin ==
| Teams | Pld | W | D | L | PF | PA | +/− | Pts |
|---|---|---|---|---|---|---|---|---|
| Argentina | 6 | 6 | 0 | 0 | 308 | 10 | +298 | 18 |
| Uruguay | 6 | 5 | 0 | 1 | 147 | 69 | +78 | 16 |
| Chile | 6 | 4 | 0 | 2 | 133 | 34 | +99 | 14 |
| Colombia | 6 | 3 | 0 | 3 | 81 | 114 | –33 | 12 |
| Paraguay | 6 | 2 | 0 | 4 | 50 | 153 | –103 | 10 |
| Venezuela | 6 | 0 | 1 | 5 | 31 | 186 | –155 | 7 |
| Peru | 6 | 0 | 1 | 5 | 29 | 213 | –184 | 7 |

5 June 2015
10:58

| Venezuela | 0–27 | Chile |

CRAI

5 June 2015
11:20

| Peru | 0–35 | Colombia |

CRAI

5 June 2015
11:42

| Argentina | 57–0 | Paraguay |

CRAI

5 June 2015
13:34

| Paraguay | 5–40 | Uruguay |

CRAI

5 June 2015
13:56

| Venezuela | 12–24 | Colombia |

CRAI

5 June 2015
14:18

| Argentina | 17–10 | Chile |

CRAI

5 June 2015
16:08

| Peru | 0–41 | Chile |

CRAI

5 June 2015
16:30

| Colombia | 12–24 | Uruguay |

CRAI

5 June 2015
16:52

| Argentina | 64–0 | Venezuela |

CRAI

6 June 2015
09:30

| Peru | 14–14 | Venezuela |

CRAI

6 June 2015
09:52

| Colombia | 5–0 | Paraguay |

CRAI

6 June 2015
10:14

| Uruguay | 12–7 | Chile |

CRAI

6 June 2015
12:04

| Uruguay | 31–0 | Venezuela |

CRAI

6 June 2015
12:26

| Chile | 31–0 | Paraguay |

CRAI

6 June 2015
12:48

| Argentina | 64–0 | Peru |

CRAI

6 June 2015
14:40

| Uruguay | 40–0 | Peru |

CRAI

6 June 2015
15:02

| Argentina | 61–0 | Colombia |

CRAI

7 June 2015
10:20

| Paraguay | 26-5 | Venezuela |

CRAI

7 June 2015
12:10

| Paraguay | 19-15 | Peru |

CRAI

7 June 2015
12:32

| Chile | 17-5 | Colombia |

CRAI

7 June 2015
14:42

| Argentina | 45-0 | Uruguay |

CRAI

== Final standings ==
Legend
In qualification position for the 2016 Summer Olympics.
In qualification position for the Final Olympic Qualification Tournament.

| Rank | Team |
|---|---|
| 1st place, gold medalist(s) | Argentina |
| 2nd place, silver medalist(s) | Uruguay |
| 3rd place, bronze medalist(s) | Chile |
| 4 | Colombia |
| 5 | Paraguay |
| 6 | Venezuela |
| 7 | Peru |

== See also ==
- 2015 CONSUR Women's Sevens
