= José Rafael Revenga =

Venezuelan diplomat (1786–1852)

José Rafael Revenga y Hernández
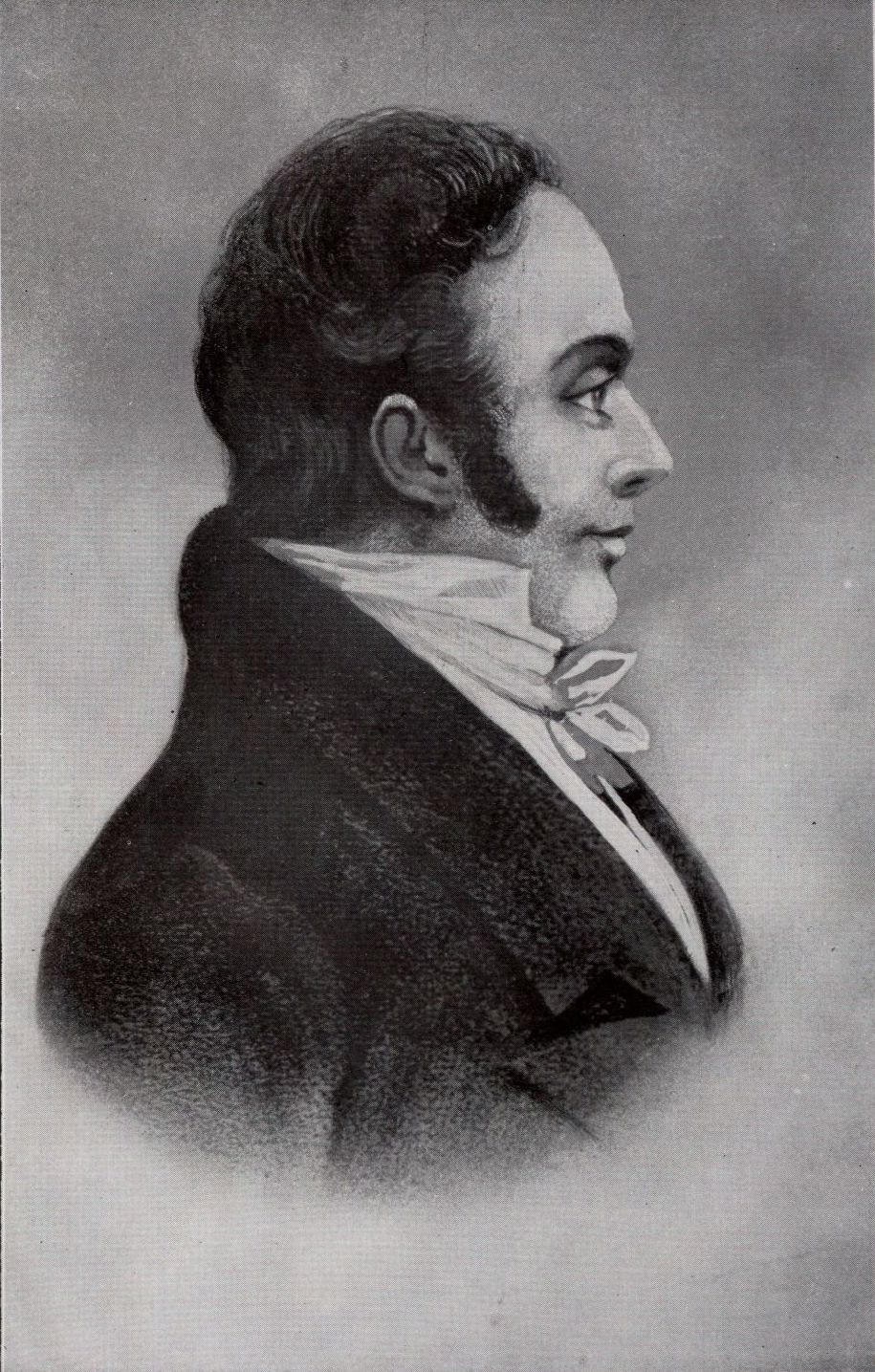

2nd Secretary of Foreign Affairs of Colombia
- Incumbent
- Assumed office 17 September 1825
- Appointed by: Francisco de Paula Santander y Omaña
- Preceded by: Pedro Gual Escandón
- Succeeded by: José Manuel Restrepo Veléz

2nd Envoy Extraordinary and Minister Plenipotentiary of Colombia to the United Kingdom
- In office 22 January 1823 – 11 November 1824
- Appointed by: Pedro Gual Escandón
- Preceded by: Francisco Antonio Zea Díaz
- Succeeded by: )Manuel José Hurtado y Arboleda

Minister of Foreign Affairs of Venezuela
- In office 8 March 1849 – 23 April 1849
- President: José Tadeo Monagas
- Preceded by: Ramón Yepes
- Succeeded by: Diego Antonio Caballero

Personal details
- Born: 24 November 1786 El Consejo, Captaincy General of Venezuela, Viceroyalty of the New Granada, Spanish Empire
- Died: 9 March 1852 (aged 65) Caracas, Caracas, Venezuela
- Resting place: National Pantheon of Venezuela; 10°30′46″N 66°54′45″W
- Spouse: Micaela Ramona de la Soledad de Clemente e Iriarte
- Profession: Lawyer

José Rafael Revenga y Hernández (24 November 1786 – 9 March 1852) was a minister of foreign affairs of Gran Colombia (1819–1821).

He was the 2nd Secretary of Foreign Affairs of Colombia starting 17 September 1825, appointed by Francisco de Paula Santander y Omaña. He was the Minister of Foreign Affairs of Venezuela from 8 March 1849 until 23 April 1849 under president José Tadeo Monagas. He was the Minister of Finance in 1849.

== Legacy ==
José Rafael Revenga support the Venezuela independence cause from the outset April 1810, entered its ranks in August 1810 as the Ministry of Foreign Affairs. In March 1811 he was sent by the first Venezuelan Congress, along with Telésforo de Orea, on a mission to the United States government. Despite meeting with President James Madison and the Secretary of State, the mission did not reach anything concrete after the fall of the First Republic in July 1812. From the United States, Revenga traveled to Cartagena de Indias, where from 1815 he served as secretary of Simon Bolívar. Following the reconquest of New Granada by the royalists, he decided to return to the United States in 1816 where he collaborated with Francisco Javier Mina in his plans to make a liberating expedition to Mexico; but he did not accompany him in this, preferring to return to Venezuela in 1818. The same year he contributed foundation of the weekly Correo del Orinoco in Angostura.

In 1822 as Minister Plenipotentiary of Gran Colombia to Britain, negotiated Great Britain's recognition of Gran Colombia as an independent country. Complained to the British government at the direction of Simón Bolívar about the presence of British settlers in Essequibo territory claimed by Venezuela: "The colonists of Demerara and Berbice have usurped a large portion of land, which according to recent treaties between Spain and Holland, belongs to our country at the west of Essequibo River. It is absolutely essential that these settlers be put under the jurisdiction and obedience to our laws, or be withdrawn to their former possessions." He is buried in the National Pantheon of Venezuela.

== See also ==
- List of ministers of foreign affairs of Venezuela

Political offices
Preceded by Ramón Yepes	25th Minister of Foreign Affairs of Venezuela; 23 April 1849- 4 May 1849	Succeeded by Diego Antonio Caballero
