= 2020 Sudamérica Rugby Sevens =

- Host nation: Chile
- Date: 12–13 December

Cup
- Champion: Argentina
- Runner-up: Brazil
- Third: Chile

Tournament details
- Matches played: 10

The 2020 Sudamérica Rugby Sevens was the 14th edition of the Sudamérica Rugby Sevens. It was held in Valparaíso, Chile from 12–13 December. Brazil upset Argentina on Day One of the competition. Argentina in the end won the Sudamérica Sevens title after defeating Brazil in the final.

== Teams ==
- Chile
- Brazil
- Argentina
- Uruguay

== Tournament ==
=== Day 1 ===
Team	P	W	D	L	PF	PA	PD
Brazil	3	2	1	0	76	22	54
Argentina	3	2	0	1	113	31	82
Chile	3	1	1	1	31	62	-31
Uruguay	3	0	0	3	0	105	-105

December 12

Chile	12-12	Brazil

Estadio Elías Figueroa Brander

December 12

Argentina	53-0	Uruguay

Estadio Elías Figueroa Brander

December 12

Chile	7-0	Uruguay

Estadio Elías Figueroa Brander

December 12

Brazil	19-10	Argentina

Estadio Elías Figueroa Brander

December 12

Brazil	45-0	Uruguay

Estadio Elías Figueroa Brander

December 12

Chile	12-50	Argentina

Estadio Elías Figueroa Brander

=== Day 2 ===
Semi-finals
Argentina	29
Chile	5
Brazil	29
Uruguay	0

Final
Argentina	26
Brazil	14
3rd Place
Chile	31
Uruguay	5
