= Kennedi Stevenson =

French rugby sevens player

Rugby union career
National sevens team
Years	Team	Comps
2025–	Canada	

Kennedi Stevenson is a Canadian rugby union player who plays for the Canada women's national rugby sevens team. She was nominated for Rookie of the Year at the conclusion of the 2025–26 SVNS series.

== Career ==
From Glen Williams, Ontario, Stevenson participated in gymnastics and volleyball prior to focusing on rugby union, having started playing rugby as a teenager in Grade 10 at Mayfield Secondary School. Within 18 months of taking up the sport, she helped Canada win a silver medal at the 2023 Commonwealth Youth Games.

While a student at Queen's University at Kingston, Stevenson played for Queen’s Women’s Rugby, winning OUA and U SPORTS Rookie of the Year awards in 2024 and helping the side win the OUA Championship. In 2025, she was named in the U SPORTS Second Team All-Canadian and OUA First Team All-Star teams as Queen’s University had a third-place finish at the U SPORTS Women’s Rugby Championship.

Stevenson also played Under-20s rugby for Canada in 15-a-side rugby union in the Transatlantic Quad Series in 2024, scoring a try against Wales U20, and represented Canada as they won the bronze medal at the 2025 Junior Pan American Games, in Asunción, Paraguay, scoring five tries in the tournament.

Stevenson made her debut for the senior Canada women's national rugby sevens team during the 2025–26 SVNS series. She score two tries in her debut tournament at the 2025 Dubai Sevens in the UAE. Following that performance, she scored four tries at the 2025 South Africa Sevens event and later also a double against France at the 2026 Singapore Sevens. She was nominated for Rookie of the Year at the conclusion of the SVNS series in June 2026.
