= Rugby union in Venezuela =

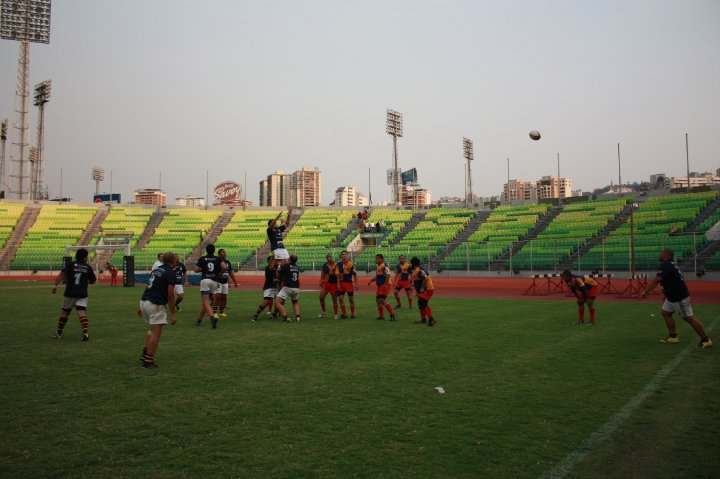
- Rugby match at Estadio Olímpico in Caracas
- Country: Venezuela
- Governing body: Venezuelan Rugby Federation
- National team: Venezuela
- First played: 1950s

Club competitions
- Campeonato Nacional de Clubes; Torneo Internacional de Rugby Los Andes; Santa Teresa seven-a-side; Seven de las Flores

International competitions
- South American Rugby Championship

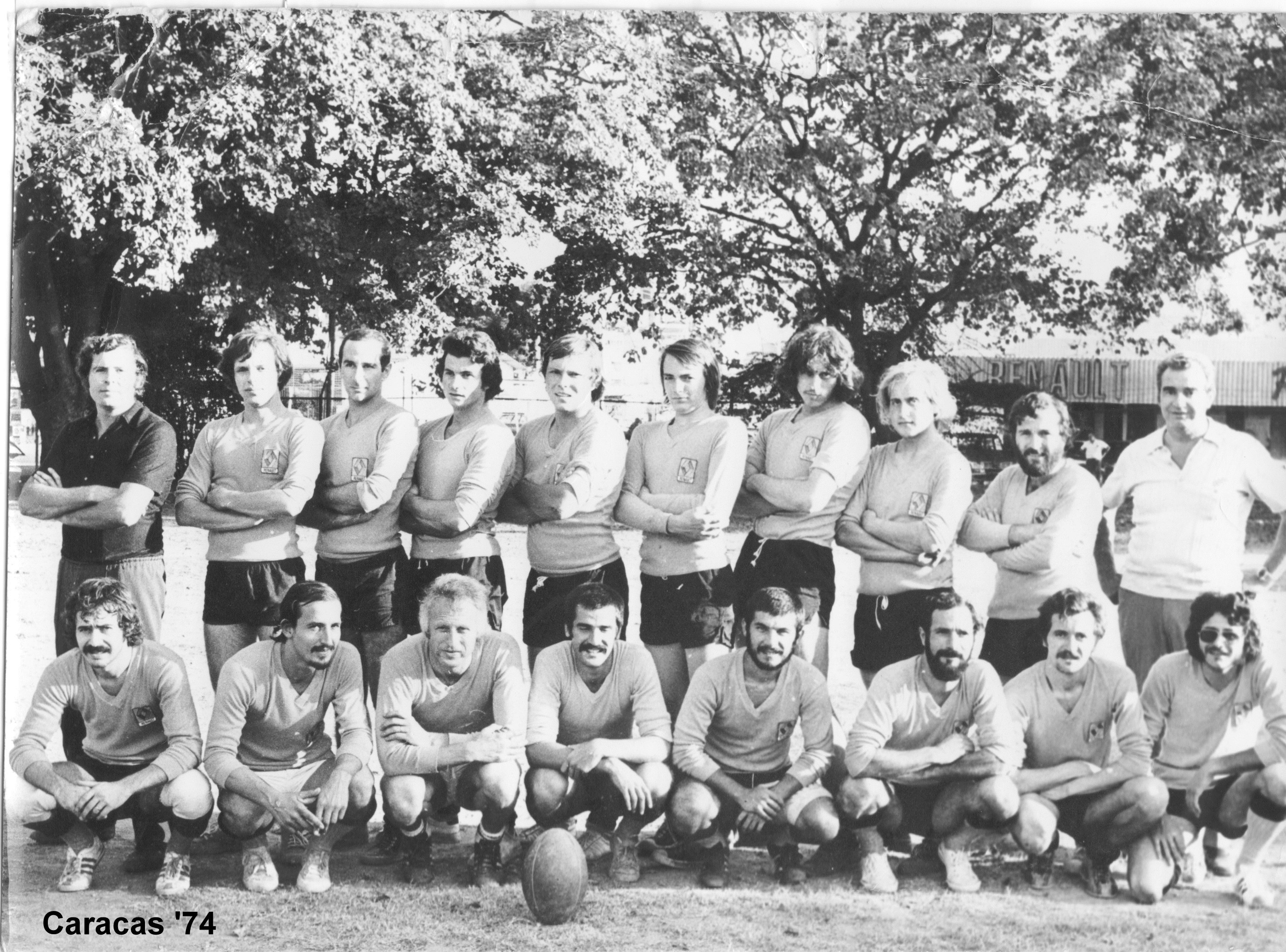
Club Renault in 1974.

Rugby union in Venezuela is a team sport that is played as an amateur sport.

== History ==
The history of rugby in Venezuela goes back to the 1950s, when a group of English oil workers played the first match in Zulia State. Martell and Renault played the first organized match on 14 July 1974.

In 1978, the first rugby club formed exclusively with native players was founded at Simón Bolívar University: the Club de Rugby de la Universidad Simón Bolívar (CRUSB). In the course of time, more rugby teams were created in Caracas and other Venezuelan cities.

Rugby first came to the UCV Maracay in 1980 when student Otto Gomez invited englishman Stewart Wittering (Leicester and Jamaica) to give e presentation to around 100 students. Following this presentation, Stewart asked the UCV Maracay sports director for permission to form a team and to train on the UCV playing field. With the help of fellow briton, Bob Hosty (Leigh, Colombia and Venezuela) and three argentinean players, the team went on to play successfully against all the rugby clubs existing at that time. Following this, rugby was exported to the UCV in Caracas and eventually to women players.

== Governing body ==
The governing body is the Venezuelan Rugby Federation, which was founded in 1992. It is affiliated to World Rugby and Sudamérica Rugby.

== National competitions ==
The most important tournament is the Campeonato Nacional de Clubes (National Championship of Clubs) contested by Venezuelan men's clubs. Another notable tournament is the Torneo Internacional de Rugby Los Andes (Los Andes Rugby International Tournament) played at Mérida. Santa Teresa seven-a-side, the Circuito Nacional de Sevens (National Sevens Series) and the Seven de las Flores (Sevens of Flowers) are important club competitions in rugby sevens.

The matches of these competitions are played at weekends.

== Popularity ==
In Venezuela, rugby is not as popular as sports such as baseball, football or basketball. The coverage of rugby competitions by Venezuelan mass media is sporadic.

Years ago, rugby players had to fund themselves in the terms of uniforms, equipment, travel costs, etc. Recently, some financial support has come from the Venezuelan Ministry of Sport and private companies which offer sponsorship to the clubs.

Rugby in Venezuela is an amateur sport and rugby players receive no remuneration.

== See also ==
- Venezuela national rugby union team
- Venezuela national rugby union team (sevens)
- Venezuela women's national rugby union team (sevens)
- Sport in Venezuela
