= José Manuel Restrepo Vélez =

Colombian botanist and politician

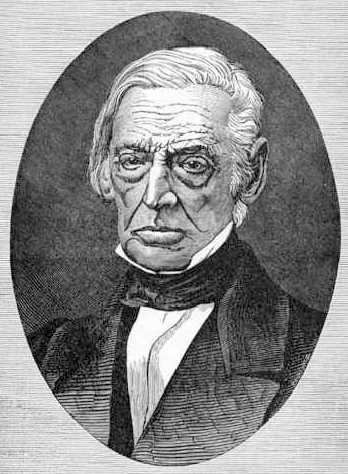
- 1882 Woodcut of José Manuel Restrepo Vélez published in Papel Periódico Ilustrado based on a daguerreotype taken by Demetrio Paredes in 1863.

1st Secretary of the Interior of Colombia
- In office 7 October 1821 – 1830
- President: Simón Bolívar y Palacios

3rd Secretary of Foreign Affairs of Colombia
- President: Simón Bolívar y Palacios
- Preceded by: José Rafael Revenga y Hernández
- Succeeded by: José Rafael Revenga y Hernández

Governor of Antioquia
- In office 2 September 1819 – 9 April 1821
- Appointed by: José María Córdova Muñoz
- Preceded by: José María Córdova Muñoz
- Succeeded by: José María Ricaurte y Nariño

Personal details
- Born: 30 December 1781 Envigado, Antioquia, Viceroyalty of the New Granada
- Died: 1 April 1863 (aged 81) Bogotá, Cundinamarca, Granadine Confederation
- Spouse: María Josefa Mariana Montoya y Zapata (1812–1863)
- Education: College of Saint Bartholomew (LLB, 1808)
- Profession: Lawyer

José Manuel Restrepo Vélez (30 December 1781 – 1 April 1863) was an investigator of Colombian flora, political figure and historian. The orchid genus Restrepia was named in his honor.

Restrepo was born in the town of Envigado, Antioquia in the Colombian Mid-west. He graduated as a lawyer from the Colegio de San Bartolomé in the city of Santa Fe de Bogotá. He later worked as Secretary for Juan del Corral and Governor Dionisio Tejada during their dictatorial government over Antioquia.

From 1811 to 1814 he became a Deputy Representative of Antioquia during the Congress of the United Provinces of New Granada. After independence from Spain was achieved by Simon Bolivar, Restrepo became governor of Antioquia in 1819 as it came to be part of Greater Colombia.

In 1827, he published a history of Colombia.

Restrepo was profoundly interested in geography and fauna of Antioquia.
