= Rugby union in Paraguay =

- Country: Paraguay
- Governing body: Paraguayan Rugby Union
- National team: Paraguay
- First played: 1950s
- Registered players: 3,520
- Clubs: 21

National competitions
- Rugby World Cup; Rugby World Cup Sevens; IRB Sevens World Series

Rugby union in Paraguay is a secondary sport. With 4,355 registered players and twenty clubs, the country currently ranks 37th worldwide and 4th in South America.

The Paraguayan Rugby Union (Union de Rugby del Paraguay) was founded in 1970, and joined the IRB in 1989.

== History ==
The first recorded game of rugby in the country was in the 1930s, between players from Cerro Porteño and Olimpia (the country's two biggest football clubs). Further development of the game was sporadic.

Asuncion Rugby Club, the country's first official rugby club, was formed in the late 1960s by two Britons, two Argentines, a Dutchman, and a New Zealander. They played informal games in the Jardin Botanico (Botanic Gardens of Asuncion) and travelled to Argentina for games.

In 1970 a second club was set up in Asuncion, the Club Universitario de Asunción (CURDA). Further clubs were established in the 1970s and 1980s.

The sport's governing body, the Paraguayan Rugby Union (Union de Rugby del Paraguay), was founded in 1970 and joined the IRFB in 1989.

The traditional stronghold of Paraguayan rugby has been the capital, Asuncion, where the majority of clubs have been based. However Since 2000 a number of Asuncion clubs have folded, combined, or struggled to field teams in both Primera (First Grade of the Paraguayan Rugby Union Championship) and Intermedia (reserve grade).

In 2013 the teams in Primera were all from Asuncion: CURDA, San Jose, Old King Club, Luque, Cristo Rey, Universidad Autonoma de Asuncion, and Santa Clara.

Las Leones de Encarnacion, from the south of the country, competed in Primera until 2009 when they switched to compete in the URNE championship of Northern Argentina. Encarnacion is a riverside city opposite the Argentine city of Posadas. Las Leones often fielded a strong team in Primera, but they are closer to the Posadas, Corrientes and Resistencia, than to Asuncion (a 5-hour bus trip). While strong at home they often struggled to field a competitive team when traveling to Asuncion every second week for Primera. They have since won the URNE championship.

Since 2010 there has been strong growth in both women's rugby and rugby outside of and in the outskirts of Asuncion. Traditionally teams such as Ciudad del Este and Coronel Oviedo played only occasionally, or fielded a team in Intermedia or Primera where they often struggled. In 2010 a separate "Campeonato del Interior" was established, in which developing clubs from the countryside played. Teams include Santani, Coronel Oviedo, Villarica, Ciudad del Este and Presidente Franco.

All Primera teams are now obliged to field a women's team. The women play 7-a-side rugby with mini 7 a side championships held every couple of weeks.

From 2013 a separate Campeonato Metropolitano (Metropolitan Championship) was also established, for new developing teams from Asuncion which could not yet compete in Primera. Teams include San Lorenzo, Capiata, Asuncion, and Sajonia.

== Divisions ==
Traditionally Paraguayan rugby clubs have fielded teams in Primera and/or Intermedia. In recent years a Campeonato del Interior (Countryside Club Championship) and Campeonato Metropolitano (Metropolitan Championship) have been formed for developing clubs and clubs in rural areas.

Primera Teams also usually field Under 18, Under 16, Under 14 and Junior teams, and, as of recently, women's rugby teams.

== Paraguayan Rugby Clubs ==
- Primera Division 2022 (First Division)

Name	Nickname	Nickname in English	Location
CURDA	Los Buhos	The Owls	Asunción
Luque	Chanchitos	The Pigs	Luque
Santa Clara	Rinocerontes	Rhinoceros	Asunción
Cristo Rey	Ñandus	Rhea Birds	Asunción
San Jose	Bulldogs	Bulldogs	Asunción

- Intermedia 2022 (2nd Division)

Name	Nickname	Nickname in English	Location
Asunción RC	El Decano	The Dean	Asunción
CURDA (Reserves)	Los Buhos	The Owls	Asunción
Jabalíes	Jabalíes	Boars	Luque
Luque (Reserves)	Chanchitos	The Pigs	Luque
Santa Clara (Reserves)	Rinocerontes	Rhinoceros	Asunción
Cristo Rey (Reserves)	Ñandus	Rhea Birds	Asunción
Old King Club	Viejos Reyes	Old Kings	Asunción
San Jose (Reserves)	Bulldogs	Bulldogs	Asunción

- Campeonato del Interior (Countryside Championship)

Name	Location
CRACO	Coronel Oviedo
Presidente Franco	Presidente Franco
Santani Rugby Club	Santani
Area 1 Rugby Club	Ciudad del Este
Hernandarias Rugby Club	Hernandarias
Taguató	Villarica
Area 1 Rugby Club	Ciudad del Este
San Juan	San Juan Nepomuceno
Saguaa Rugby Club	Ciudad de Caaguazú
San Roque	San Roque

- Campeonato Metropolitano (Metropolitan Championship)

Name
Universidad Autonoma
San Lorenzo
Capiata
Sajonia
Villeta

- Encarnación Rugby Club "Las Leones de Encarnación" compete in the URNE rugby Championship which is part of the Argentine Rugby Union.

There are several former clubs which no longer exist, such as Los Cuervos, Jabalí and Yakaré.

== Senior Paraguayan Rugby Championship ==
Year	Champions	Second place
2021	CURDA	San José
2020	not played	
2019	CURDA	San José
2018	CURDA	Luque
2017	CURDA	Luque
2016	CURDA	Luque
2015	Luque	CURDA
2014	Luque	Santa Clara
2013	CURDA	Santa Clara
2012	CURDA	Luque
2011	Luque	Santa Clara
2010	Cristo Rey	Luque
2009	CURDA	Luque
2008	CURDA	Yacht
2007	CURDA	Santa Clara
2006	CURDA	Yacht
2005	CURDA	San José
2004	CURDA (Yellow)	CURDA (Black)
2003	San José	CURDA
2002	San José	Santa Clara
2001	San José	Santa Clara
2000	CURDA	San José
1999	CURDA	Encarnacion RC
1998	San José	
1997	Old King	
1996	San José	
1995	CURDA	San José
1994	CURDA	San José
1993	San José	
1992	San José	
1991	San José	
1990	San José	
1989	San José	
1988	San José	
1987	San José	
1986	CURDA	
1985	CURDA	
1984	CURDA	
1983	CURDA	
1982	CURDA	
1981	CURDA	
1980	CURDA	
1979	CURDA	
1978	CURDA	
1977	CURDA	
1976	CURDA	
1975	CURDA	
1974	CURDA	
1973	CURDA	
1972	CURDA	
1971	CURDA	Asunción
1970	Asunción	CURDA

== Women's rugby ==
As mentioned above, women's rugby in Paraguay involves the teams from Primera fielding Seven-a-side teams. To play in Primera teams are obliged to field a women's team, which has spurred on the development of the sport for women.

The teams involved are CURDA, San Jose, Cristo Rey, Santa Clara, Universidad Autonoma de Asuncion, Old King Club, and Luque.

Old King Club has dominated women's rugby in Paraguay, winning every women's championship and providing the bulk of the Paraguayan Women's Seven-a-side team. Both Old King Club and the National Women's Team are coached by Victor Velilla.

Although Paraguay's women have not yet played a full 15 a sive test match, they have been playing international sevens rugby since 2004. In 2013 they came 8th and last in the CONSUR South American Women's Sevens Championship.

== Paraguayans Playing Abroad ==
Several Paraguayans have played overseas.

In France, Cesar Meilike, Jatar Fernandez, Fabio Franco and Emiliano Arnau played for Strasbourg, and José Otaño and Joel Orihuela for US CENAC, at Fédérale 2, and Freddy Lares and Miguel Jara for Houilles Carrilies at Fédérale 3.

In Germany several Paraguayans have played in Bundesliga 1 including Juan Caba Cabañas, Fabio Franco, Willians Portillo and Oscar Merino.

In Spain Willians Portillo (Madrid), Javier Morinigo (San Cugat – Barcelona, ex-Albertong de Sudafrica), Igor Huerta (Universidad de Málaga), Jorge Ocampo (CEU Rugby Barcelona) and Emiliano Arnau (Rugby Lavila) have played.

Diego Sotelo and Gonzalo Sanches played College Rugby Division 1 in the United States.

Alex Sharman is an Australian-born naturalized Paraguayan who played for Paraguay and the University of Sydney (NSW, Australia), Falkirk (Scotland), Hinckley and Clifton Rugby Clubs (England), St. Louis Ramblers (USA) and Rugby La Vila (Spain).

For several reasons these overseas players often aren't available to play for Paraguay, but in 2009 Joel Orihuela and Juan Cabanas returned to South America for the South American Championships in Montevideo, and in 2010 Jose Otano, Diego Sotelo played for Paraguay in the South American Championship in Santiago de Chile.

== See also ==
- Paraguay national rugby union team
