= Finavera Wind Energy =

Finavera Wind Energy Inc.
- Type: Public
- Traded as: TSX-V:FVR
- Industry: power generation
- Founded: 2003
- Defunct: December 14, 2017
- Fate: Acquired by Solar Alliance Energy Inc.
- Headquarters: Vancouver, Canada
- Key people: Jason Bak (CEO)
- Products: wind energy
- Website: www.finavera.com

Finavera Wind Energy Inc. is a former Canadian wind power company, between 2007 and 2017, that owned and operated wind farms in northeastern British Columbia. Headquartered in Vancouver, the company began listing shares on TSX Venture Exchange in 2007 until it was acquired in 2017 by Solar Alliance Energy Inc TSX-V: SOLR. Formerly named Finavera Renewables Inc., the company develops wind farms in Canada and Ireland. The company was founded in Dublin, Ireland, in 2003. On 4 April 4, 2005, Finavera acquired a 10% stake in the wave energy technology company AquaEnergy Group, and in 2006, it acquired rest of the shares in AquaEnergy. AquaEnergy became a wholly owned subsidiary of Finavera and was renamed Finavera Renewables Ocean Energy. It developed the AquaBuOY wave energy conversion technology with plan to install the converter in Makah Bay off the coast of Newport, Oregon. However, in 2010 Finavera Renewables Ocean Energy was sold and Finavera concentrated to the wind energy.

== Operations ==
The company developed four wind projects in the Peace Region in Northern British Columbia that could provide up to 301 megawatts (MW) of electricity which is approximately consumption of 75,000 households. The program includes of the Tumbler Ridge, Wildmare, Meikle, and Bullmoose wind farms. In March 2010, BC Hydro awarded Finavera with four 25-year electricity purchase agreements under its 2008 Clean Power Call. For financing this program, Finavera has partnered with GE Energy with the signing of a $7.5 million Joint Development Agreement.

Finavera is a minor partner in the 105 MW Cloosh Valley wind project in Ireland. 90% of the project is owned by SSE Renewables, a subsidiary of Scottish and Southern Energy.
