= 2024 RAN Sevens =

Rugby tournament

- Hosts: Trinidad and Tobago
- Date: November 22–24; 2024
- Nations: 12

Final positions
- Champions: Canada
- Runners-up: Trinidad and Tobago
- Third: Jamaica

Series details
- Matches played: 34

The 2024 RAN Sevens is a North American rugby sevens tournament that took place at the Larry Gomes Stadium in Trinidad and Tobago from 22 to 24 November 2024. Canada won the tournament and qualified for the 2025 Challenger Series. Canada and Trinidad and Tobago qualified their respective U20s teams for the 2025 Junior Pan American Games in Asunción, Paraguay.

== Format ==
Teams played each other in their respective pools in a round-robin. No extra time was given during the pool stage. Teams in Tier 1 played in a Cup quarter-final, the losers advanced to a Plate semi-finals and the winners progressed to the Cup semi-finals, and then to the final or third-place matches. Tier 2 had a semi-final, a final and a third-place match.

The winner of the tournament qualifies for the 2025 Challenger Series. The top two teams, excluding Canada who is pre-qualified, will also qualify their countries for the 2025 Junior Pan American Games in Paraguay. The winner of Tier 2 will be promoted to the Tier 1 tournament in 2025 in a promotion-relegation format if they are a full member Union of Rugby Americas North.

== Teams ==
The twelve teams competing were:

Tier 1 Teams

- Barbados
- Bermuda
- Canada
- Cayman Islands
- Guyana
- Jamaica
- Mexico
- Trinidad and Tobago

Tier 2 Teams

- Curaçao (Associate Member)
- Dominican Republic (Associate Member)
- Saint Vincent and the Grenadines (Full Member)
- Turks and Caicos Islands (Associate Member)

== Tier 1 ==
=== Pool stage ===
==== Pool A ====
Team	Pld	W	D	L	PF	PA	PD	TF	TA	TD	Pts
Canada	3	2	1	0	67	0	+67	11	0	+11	8
Barbados	3	2	1	0	40	17	+23	6	3	+3	8
Guyana	3	1	0	2	22	57	–35	4	9	–5	5
Bermuda	3	0	0	3	14	69	–55	2	11	–9	3

November 22

Canada	29–0	Guyana

Larry Gomes Stadium

November 22

Barbados	19–7	Bermuda

Larry Gomes Stadium

November 23

Canada	38–0	Bermuda

Larry Gomes Stadium

November 23

Barbados	21–10	Guyana

Larry Gomes Stadium

November 23

Canada	0–0 (Note: Draw due to Weather)	Barbados

Larry Gomes Stadium

November 23

Bermuda	7–12	Guyana

Larry Gomes Stadium

==== Pool B ====
Team	Pld	W	D	L	PF	PA	PD	TF	TA	TD	Pts
Mexico	3	2	0	1	31	34	–3	5	6	–1	7
Jamaica	3	2	0	1	49	38	+11	9	6	+3	7
Trinidad and Tobago	3	1	1	1	34	39	–5	6	7	–1	6
Cayman Islands	3	0	1	2	50	53	–3	8	9	–1	4

November 22

Jamaica	22–21	Cayman Islands

Larry Gomes Stadium

November 22

Mexico	5–12	Trinidad and Tobago

Larry Gomes Stadium

November 23

Mexico	14–12	Cayman Islands

Larry Gomes Stadium

November 23

Jamaica	17–5	Trinidad and Tobago

Larry Gomes Stadium

November 23

Mexico	12–10	Jamaica

Larry Gomes Stadium

November 23

Cayman Islands	17–17	Trinidad and Tobago

Larry Gomes Stadium

=== Finals ===
==== Cup Quarter-finals ====
Quarter-finals
November 24 – Larry Gomes Stadium
Canada	38
Cayman Islands	0
November 24 – Larry Gomes Stadium
Jamaica	38
Guyana	14
November 24 – Larry Gomes Stadium
Mexico	14
Bermuda	0
November 24 – Larry Gomes Stadium
Barbados	0
Trinidad & Tobago	29

Semi-finals
November 24 – Larry Gomes Stadium
Canada	26
Jamaica	0
November 24 – Larry Gomes Stadium
Mexico	7
Trinidad & Tobago	19

Cup Final
November 24 – Larry Gomes Stadium
Canada	38
Trinidad & Tobago	0
3rd Place
November 24 – Larry Gomes Stadium
Jamaica	12
Mexico	0

==== Plate Semi-finals ====
Semi-finals
November 24 – Larry Gomes Stadium
Cayman Islands	24
Guyana	12
November 24 – Larry Gomes Stadium
Bermuda	19
Barbados	10

Plate Final
November 24 – Larry Gomes Stadium
Bermuda	10
Cayman Islands	5
7th Place
November 24 – Larry Gomes Stadium
Guyana	12
Barbados	10

== Tier 1 final standings ==
Rank	Team
1st place, gold medalist(s)	Canada
2nd place, silver medalist(s)	Trinidad and Tobago
3rd place, bronze medalist(s)	Jamaica
4	Mexico
5	Bermuda
6	Cayman Islands
7	Guyana
8	Barbados

== Tier 2 ==
=== Pool stage ===
Team	Pld	W	D	L	PF	PA	PD	TF	TA	TD	Pts
Dominican Republic	3	3	0	0	96	0	+96	16	0	+16	9
Curaçao	3	2	0	1	62	24	+38	10	14	–4	7
Turks & Caicos Islands	3	1	0	2	30	72	–42	16	12	+4	5
Saint Vincent	3	0	0	3	10	102	–92	2	18	–16	3

November 22

Turks & Caicos Islands	5–31	Curaçao

Larry Gomes Stadium

November 22

Dominican Republic	46–0	Saint Vincent

Larry Gomes Stadium

November 23

Turks & Caicos Islands	25–10	Saint Vincent

Larry Gomes Stadium

November 23

Dominican Republic	19–0	Curaçao

Larry Gomes Stadium

November 23

Turks & Caicos Islands	0–31	Dominican Republic

Larry Gomes Stadium

November 23

Saint Vincent	0–31	Curaçao

Larry Gomes Stadium

=== Finals ===
Semi-finals
November 24 – Larry Gomes Stadium
Dominican Rep.	34
Saint Vincent	0
November 24 – Larry Gomes Stadium
Curaçao	24
Turks & Caicos	5

Cup Final
November 24 – Larry Gomes Stadium
Dominican Rep.	22
Curaçao	0
3rd Place
November 24 – Larry Gomes Stadium
Turks & Caicos	25
Saint Vincent	5

== Tier 2 final standings ==
Rank	Team
1	Dominican Republic
2	Curaçao
3	Turks and Caicos Islands
4	Saint Vincent and the Grenadines
