= Venezuelan Rugby Federation =

Sports governing body in Venezuela

Federación Venezolana de Rugby
- Sport: Rugby union
- Founded: 1992; 34 years ago
- World Rugby affiliation: 1998
- Headquarters: Caracas, Venezuela
- President: Erickson Bermúdez
- Men's coach: Gustavo López
- Website: feverugby.com

The Venezuelan Rugby Federation (Spanish: Federación Venezolana de Rugby (FVR)) is the governing body of rugby union in Venezuela. It was founded in 1992. It is a member of World Rugby since 1998 and Sudamérica Rugby.

The Venezuelan Rugby Federation was recognised by the Venezuelan Ministry of Sport in 2005. It was admitted by the Venezuelan Olympic Committee on 1 February 2010.

== See also ==
- Rugby union in Venezuela
- Venezuela national rugby union team
- Venezuela national rugby union team (sevens)
- Venezuela women's national rugby union team (sevens)
- Campeonato Nacional de Clubes
