= Paraguayan Rugby Union =

Sport national governing body

Unión de Rugby del Paraguay
- Sport: Rugby union
- Founded: 1970; 56 years ago
- World Rugby affiliation: 1989
- Sudamérica Rugby affiliation: 1989
- President: Nelson Mendoza Rolón
- Website: www.urp.org.py

The Paraguayan Rugby Union (Spanish: Unión de Rugby del Paraguay) is the governing body for rugby union in Paraguay. It was founded in 1970 and became affiliated to the International Rugby Board in 1989.

== Senior Paraguayan Rugby Championship ==
| Year | Champions | Second place |
|---|---|---|
| 2012 | CURDA | Luque |
| 2011 | Luque | Santa Clara |
| 2010 | Cristo Rey | Luque |
| 2009 | CURDA | Luque |
| 2008 | CURDA | Yacht |
| 2007 | CURDA | Santa Clara |
| 2006 | CURDA | Yacht |
| 2005 | CURDA | San José |
| 2004 | CURDA (Yellow) | CURDA (Black) |
| 2003 | San José | CURDA |
| 2003 Apertura | Santa Clara (Unbeaten) | San José |
| 2002 | San José | Santa Clara |
| 2001 | San José | Santa Clara |
| 2000 | CURDA | San José |
| 1999 | CURDA | Encarnacion RC |
| 1998 | San José | |
| 1997 | Old King | |
| 1996 | San José | |
| 1995 | CURDA | San José |
| 1994 | CURDA | San José |
| 1993 | San José | |
| 1992 | San José | |
| 1991 | San José | |
| 1990 | San José | |
| 1989 | San José | |
| 1988 | San José | |
| 1987 | San José | |
| 1986 | CURDA | |
| 1985 | San José | |
| 1984 | | |
| 1983 | | |
| 1982 | | |
| 1981 | | |
| 1980 | CURDA y San José | |
| 1979 | | |
| 1978 | | |
| 1977 | | |
| 1976 | | |
| 1975 | | |
| 1974 | | |
| 1973 | | |
| 1972 | | |
| 1971 | CURDA | Asunción |
| 1970 | Asunción | CURDA |

== See also ==
- Paraguay national rugby union team
- Rugby union in Paraguay
