= Venezuela national rugby sevens team =

Venezuela
- Union: Venezuelan Rugby Federation
- Nickname: Las Orquídeas
- Emblem: Easter orchid (Cattleya mossiae)
- Coach: Gustavo López
Team kit

World Cup Sevens
- Appearances: None

The Venezuela national rugby union sevens team is Venezuela's representative team in rugby sevens.

== Tournament record ==
=== South American Men's Sevens ===
- 2006 - 7th
- 2007 - 8th
- 2008 - 8th
- 2009 - 8th
- 2010 - 8th
- 2011 - 8th
- 2012 - 8th
- 2013 - 8th
- 2014 - Did not contest
- 2015 - 6th

=== Pan American Games ===
- 2011 - Did not qualify
- 2015 - Did not contest

=== Bolivarian Games ===
- 2013 - 5th

=== Central American and Caribbean Games ===
- 2010 - 6th
- 2014 - 4th

== Current squad ==
Squad to 2015 South American Men's Sevens.

Player	Club
Wilkinson Arrieta	Proyecto Alcatraz Rugby Club
Ramón Ruiz	Proyecto Alcatraz Rugby Club
Luis Romero	Tigres de Cabimas
Gustavo Nouel	Mérida Rugby Club
Ulises Andara	Universidad de Carabobo Rugby Club
José Rojas	Taurus Rugby Club
Carlos Figueroa	Elite Rugby Club Monagas
Roberto Schaefer	Mérida Rugby Club
Francisco Toyo	Tigres de Cabimas
Néstor Aguirre	UCAB Rugby Club
Albert Hoeger	Mérida Rugby Club
Wilmer Marín	Margarita Rugby Club

== See also ==
- Rugby union in Venezuela
- Venezuela national rugby union team
- Venezuela women's national rugby union team (sevens)
