= Colombia national rugby sevens team =

The Colombia national rugby sevens team participates in the annual Sudamérica Rugby Sevens tournament. Their best finish was in the 2015 tournament, where they finished fourth. The team is governed by the Colombian Rugby Federation.

Colombia has not yet qualified for any major global rugby sevens competitions, such as the Rugby World Cup Sevens, the World Rugby Sevens Series, nor Rugby sevens at the Summer Olympics. Colombia participated in the 2018 Sudamérica Rugby Sevens, a qualifying tournament for the 2018 Rugby World Cup Sevens, but failed to qualify.
