= El Consejo =

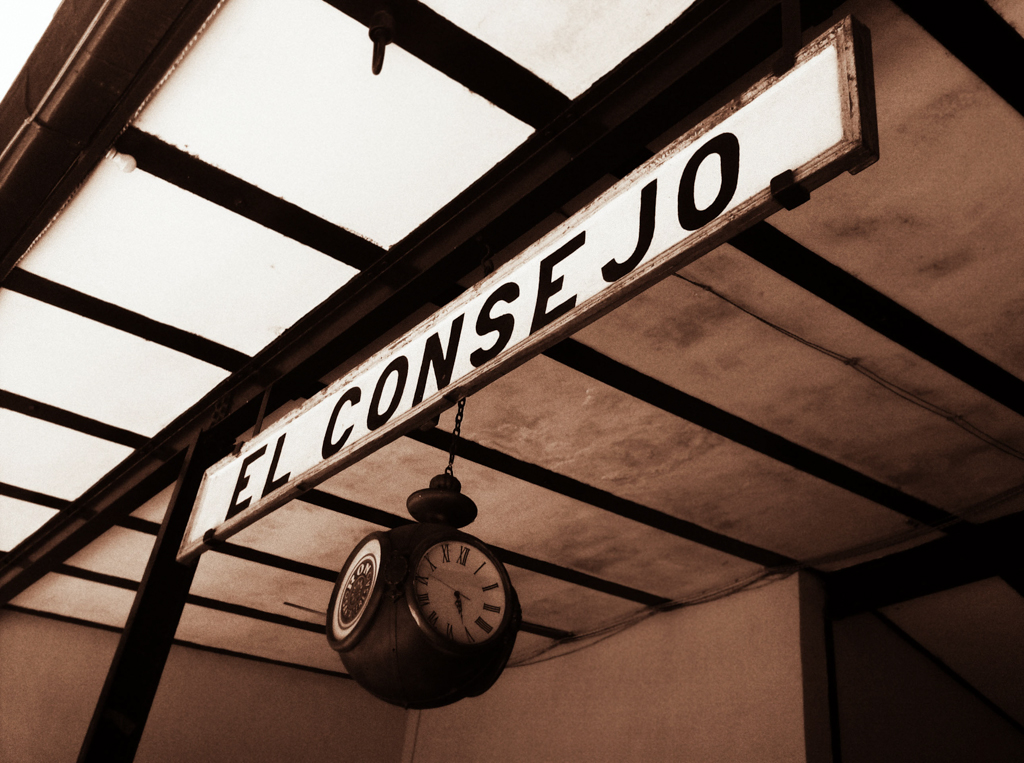

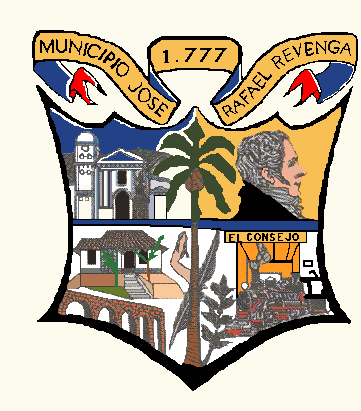
- Coat of arms

- Location within Venezuela
- Coordinates: 10°14′39″N 67°14′42″W
- Country: Venezuela
- State: Aragua
- Municipality: José Rafael Revenga Municipality
- Elevation: 534 m (1,752 ft)

Population
  - Total: 41,748
- Time zone: UTC−4 (VET)
- Climate: Aw

El Consejo is a town in the state of Aragua, Venezuela. It is the shire town of the José Rafael Revenga Municipality.

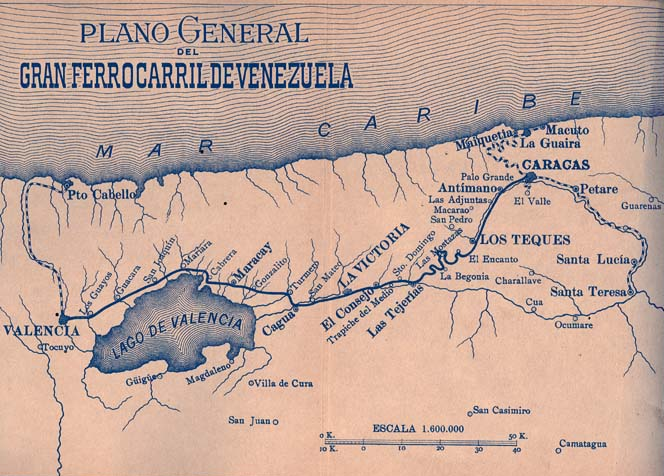

The town had a station on the Great Venezuela Railway.

== See also ==
- List of cities and towns in Venezuela
