= Paraguay national rugby sevens team =

Paraguay
- Union: Unión de Rugby del Paraguay
- Nickname: Los yacarés (The Alligators)
Team kit

The Paraguay national rugby sevens team is a minor national sevens side. They have played in the Consur men's sevens championships. They have not qualified for any major global tournaments.

== Tournament history ==
=== South American Games ===
South American Games record
Year	Round	Position	Pld	W	L	D
(Chile) 2014	Group Stage	6/7	6	0	5	1
(Bolivia) 2018	Group Stage	6/7	6	1	5	0
(Paraguay) 2022	TBD					
Total	0 Titles	0/2	0	0	0	0

=== Pan American Games ===
Pan American Games record
Year	Round	Position	Pld	W	L	D
(Mexico) 2011	Did not qualify					
(Canada) 2015	Did not qualify					
Total	0 Titles	0/2	0	0	0	0

=== Rugby World Cup Sevens ===
World Cup record
Year	Round	Position	Pld	W	L	D
(Scotland) 1993	Did not qualify					
(Hong Kong) 1997	Did not qualify					
(Argentina) 2001	Did not qualify					
(Hong Kong) 2005	Did not qualify					
(United Arab Emirates) 2009	Did not qualify					
(Russia) 2013	Did not qualify					
(United States) 2018	Did not qualify					
Total	0 Titles	0/6	0	0	0	0

== See also ==
- Rugby union in Paraguay
