= Rugby sevens at the 2016 Summer Olympics – Women's team squads =

This article shows the rosters of all participating teams at the women's rugby sevens tournament at the 2016 Summer Olympics in Rio de Janeiro.

== Pool A ==
=== Australia ===
The following is the Australia roster in the women's rugby sevens tournament of the 2016 Summer Olympics.

Head coach: Tim Walsh

Backs		Forwards
3	Nicole Beck	1	Shannon Parry (c)
5	Emma Tonegato	2	Sharni Williams (c)
6	Evania Pelite	4	Gemma Etheridge
7	Charlotte Caslick	8	Chloe Dalton
10	Alicia Quirk	9	Amy Turner
11	Emilee Cherry
12	Ellia Green

=== Colombia ===
The following is the Colombia roster in the women's rugby sevens tournament of the 2016 Summer Olympics.

Head coach: Laurent Palau

Backs		Forwards
2	Nathalie Marchino	1	Nicole Acevedo
4	Khaterinne Medina	3	Alejandra Betancur (c)
6	Isabel Romero	5	Ana Ramírez
8	Solangie Delgado	7	Estefanía Ramírez
9	Camila Lopera	10	Guadalupe López
11	Sharon Acevedo
12	Laura González

=== Fiji ===
The following is the Fiji roster in the women's rugby sevens tournament of the 2016 Summer Olympics.

Head coach: Chris Cracknell

Backs		Forwards
3	Raijieli Daveau	1	Litia Naiqato
4	Asena Rokomarama	2	Merewai Cumu
7	Rusila Nagasau	5	Timaima Tamoi
8	Lavenia Tinai	6	Rebecca Tavo
9	Ana Maria Roqica (c)	13	Jiowana Sauto
10	Viniana Riwai
11	Luisa Tisolo
12	Timaima Ravisa

- Jiowana Sauto was included in the day 3 squad after Daveau was injured in day 2.

=== United States ===
The following is the United States roster in the women's rugby sevens tournament of the 2016 Summer Olympics.

Head coach: Richie Walker

Backs		Forwards
4	Alev Kelter	1	Jillion Potter
5	Bui Baravilala	2	Kelly Griffin (c)
6	Lauren Doyle	3	Kathryn Johnson
7	Victoria Folayan	8	Carmen Farmer
10	Richelle Stephens	9	Joanne Fa'avesi
11	Ryan Carlyle
12	Jessica Javelet

== Pool B ==
=== France ===
The following is the France roster in the women's rugby sevens tournament of the 2016 Summer Olympics.

Head coach: David Courteix

Backs		Forwards
4	Pauline Biscarat	1	Rose Thomas
5	Jade Le Pesq	2	Audrey Amiel
6	Fanny Horta (c)	3	Marjorie Mayans
7	Caroline Ladagnous	9	Jennifer Troncy
8	Camille Grassineau	10	Elodie Guiglion
12	Lina Guérin	11	Shannon Izar
14	Jessy Tremouliere

- Jessy Tremouliere was a late addition before the Olympics, replacing Christelle Le Duff who replaced Shannon Izar.

=== Kenya ===
The following is the Kenya roster in the women's rugby sevens tournament of the 2016 Summer Olympics.

Head coach: Michael Mulima

Backs		Forwards
4	Rachael Mbogo	1	Stacy Otieno
5	Linet Arasa	2	Janet Awino
7	Doreen Nziwa	3	Sheila Chajira
8	Janet Okelo	6	Camilyne Oyuayo
9	Irene Otieno	12	Philadelphia Olando
10	Catherine Abilla (c)
11	Celestine Masinde

=== New Zealand ===
The following is the New Zealand roster in the women's rugby sevens tournament of the 2016 Summer Olympics.

Head coach: Sean Horan

Backs		Forwards
6	Gayle Broughton	1	Ruby Tui
7	Tyla Nathan-Wong	2	Shakira Baker
8	Kelly Brazier	3	Terina Te Tamaki
10	Theresa Fitzpatrick	4	Niall Williams
11	Portia Woodman	5	Sarah Goss (c)
12	Kayla McAlister	9	Huriana Manuel

=== Spain ===
The following is the Spain roster in the women's rugby sevens tournament of the 2016 Summer Olympics.

Head coach: José Antonio Barrio

Backs		Forwards
4	Patricia García	1	Berta García
7	Bárbara Pla	2	Paula Medín
9	María Casado	3	Ángela del Pan
10	Vanesa Rial	5	Marina Bravo
11	Iera Echebarria	6	Elisabet Martínez (c)
		8	Amaia Erbina
		12	María Ribera

== Pool C ==
=== Brazil ===
The following is the Brazil roster in the women's rugby sevens tournament of the 2016 Summer Olympics.

Head coach: Chris Neill

Trainer: Aristide Guerriero

Backs		Forwards
4	Edna Santini	1	Juliana Esteves dos Santos
5	Paula Ishibashi (c)	2	Luiza Campos
6	Tais Balconi	3	Júlia Sardá
7	Haline Scatrut	8	Beatriz Futuro Muhlbauer
10	Raquel Kochhann	9	Amanda Araújo
11	Isadora Cerullo	13	Mariana Barbosa Ramalho
12	Cláudia Teles

- Reserve Mariana Barbosa Ramalho was added to the main squad after day 1 after Sardá suffered an injury.

=== Canada ===
The following was the Canada roster in the women's rugby sevens tournament of the 2016 Summer Olympics.

Head coach: John Tait

- Brittany Benn
- Hannah Darling
- Bianca Farella
- Jen Kish (C)
- Ghislaine Landry
- Megan Lukan
- Kayla Moleschi
- Karen Paquin
- Kelly Russell
- Ashley Steacy
- Natasha Watcham-Roy
- Charity Williams

=== Great Britain ===
The following is the Great Britain squad in the women's rugby sevens tournament of the 2016 Summer Olympics.

Head coach: Simon Middleton

Backs		Forwards
1	(England) Claire Allan	2	(England) Abbie Brown
3	(England) Alice Richardson	6	(England) Katy McLean
4	(England) Emily Scarratt (c)	7	(England) Heather Fisher
5	(England) Danielle Waterman	12	(England) Amy Wilson-Hardy
8	(England) Emily Scott
9	(England) Natasha Hunt
10	(England) Joanne Watmore
11	(Wales) Jasmine Joyce

=== Japan ===
The following is the Japan roster in the women's rugby sevens tournament of the 2016 Summer Olympics.

Head coach: Keiko Asami

Backs		Forwards
1	Chiharu Nakamura (c)	3	Noriko Taniguchi
7	Marie Yamaguchi	4	Mio Yamanaka
9	Mifuyu Koide	5	Ayaka Suzuki
10	Yume Okuroda	6	Ano Kuwai
11	Yuka Kanematsu	8	Chisato Yokoo
2	Makiko Tomita	12	Kana Mitsugi
		13	Aya Takeuchi

- Reserve Aya Takeuchi was added to the main squad after day 1 after Tomita suffered an injury.

== See also ==
- Rugby sevens at the 2016 Summer Olympics – Men's team squads
