= Kenya at the 2016 Summer Olympics =

- IOC code: KEN
- NOC: National Olympic Committee of Kenya
- Website: teamkenya.or.ke

in Rio de Janeiro
- Competitors: 89 in 7 sports
- Flag bearers: Shehzana Anwar (opening); Mercy Cherono (closing)
- Medals Ranked 15th: Gold 6 Silver 6 Bronze 1 Total 13

Summer Olympics appearances (overview)
- 1956; 1960; 1964; 1968; 1972; 1976–1980; 1984; 1988; 1992; 1996; 2000; 2004; 2008; 2012; 2016; 2020; 2024

Kenya competed at the 2016 Summer Olympics in Rio de Janeiro, Brazil, from 5 to 21 August 2016. This was the nation's fourteenth appearance at the Summer Olympics.

The National Olympic Committee of Kenya (NOCK) sent its largest ever delegation to the Games, with 89 athletes, 47 men and 42 women, competing across seven sports. Among the sports represented by the nation's athletes, Kenya marked its Olympic debut in rugby sevens (new to the 2016 Games), as well as its return to archery after 16 years and judo after 24 years. As usual, athletics had the largest team by sport with 48 athletes, roughly more than half of the nation's full roster size.

The Kenyan roster was highlighted by five past Olympic medalists, including world record holder David Rudisha in the men's 800 metres, middle-distance runner Asbel Kiprop, steeplechasers Brimin Kipruto and Ezekiel Kemboi, and four-time Olympian Vivian Cheruiyot, who previously won two medals in long-distance running at London 2012. Other notable Kenyan athletes featured Africa's top javelin thrower and 2015 world champion Julius Yego, and archer Shehzana Anwar, who was eventually chosen as the nation's flag bearer in the opening ceremony.

Due to Kenya's national anti-doping organisation having been declared non-compliant with the World Anti-Doping Code, the International Olympic Committee decided on 21 June 2016 that the eligibility of Kenyan athletes should be decided on an individual basis by the International Federation, governing each sport.

Despite the controversies, Kenya left Rio de Janeiro with 13 medals (6 golds, 6 silver, and 1 bronze), marking its most successful outcome in Olympic history based on the medal position. All of these medals were awarded to the track and field athletes, with Rudisha successfully retaining his men's 800 m title. For the first time in history, Kenya obtained medals in the field events and hurdles through Yego and Boniface Mucheru, respectively, as well as the women's marathon title from Jemima Sumgong. Tantalizing results in women's distance running saw Cheruiyot and Faith Kipyegon upstage the race favorites from Ethiopia to take the gold medals. Meanwhile, Conseslus Kipruto surpassed the defending champion Kemboi to earn Kenya's eleventh overall title in the men's 3000 m steeplechase. Kemboi, who initially won bronze to become the first steeplechaser with three Olympic medals, was eventually disqualified for stepping off the track at the water jump phase.

== Medalists ==
| Medal | Name | Sport | Event | Date |
|---|---|---|---|---|
| Gold | Jemima Sumgong | Athletics | Women's marathon | 14 August |
| Gold | David Rudisha | Athletics | Men's 800 m | 15 August |
| Gold | Faith Kipyegon | Athletics | Women's 1500 m | 16 August |
| Gold | Conseslus Kipruto | Athletics | Men's 3000 m steeplechase | 17 August |
| Gold | Vivian Cheruiyot | Athletics | Women's 5000 m | 20 August |
| Gold | Eliud Kipchoge | Athletics | Men's marathon | 21 August |
| Silver | Vivian Cheruiyot | Athletics | Women's 10,000 m | 12 August |
| Silver | Paul Tanui | Athletics | Men's 10,000 m | 13 August |
| Silver | Hyvin Jepkemoi | Athletics | Women's 3000 m steeplechase | 15 August |
| Silver | Boniface Mucheru | Athletics | Men's 400 m hurdles | 18 August |
| Silver | Hellen Obiri | Athletics | Women's 5000 m | 20 August |
| Silver | Julius Yego | Athletics | Men's javelin throw | 20 August |
| Bronze | Margaret Wambui | Athletics | Women's 800 m | 20 August |

== Archery ==
One Kenyan archer qualified for the women's individual recurve by obtaining one of the three Olympic places available from the 2016 African Archery Championships in Windhoek, Namibia, anticipating the nation's Olympic return to the sport for the first time since 2000.

| Athlete | Event | Ranking round | | Round of 64 | Round of 32 | Round of 16 | Quarterfinals | Semifinals | Final / BM | |
| Athlete | Event | Score | Seed | Opposition Score | Opposition Score | Opposition Score | Opposition Score | Opposition Score | Opposition Score | Rank |
|---|---|---|---|---|---|---|---|---|---|---|
| Shehzana Anwar | Women's individual | 579 | 62 | Ki B-b (KOR); L 1–7 | Did not advance | | | | | |

== Athletics (track and field) ==
Kenyan athletes achieved qualifying standards in the following athletics events (up to a maximum of 3 athletes in each event):

Six marathon runners (three per gender) were named to the Kenyan team on May 10, 2016, with 42 more athletes (29 men and 13 women) joining them and being added to the roster on July 2, 2016, based on their performances achieved throughout the qualifying period. Among them were reigning Olympic men's 800 metres champion David Rudisha, two-time steeplechase gold medalist Ezekiel Kemboi, 2015 Worlds champions Julius Yego (javelin throw) and Nicholas Bett (400 m hurdles), and double Olympic medalist Vivian Cheruiyot in long-distance running.

Key

- Note–Ranks given for track events are within the athlete's heat only
- Q = Qualified for the next round
- q = Qualified for the next round as a fastest loser or, in field events, by position without achieving the qualifying target
- NR = National record
- N/A = Round not applicable for the event
- Bye = Athlete not required to compete in round

Track & road events
Men

| Athlete | Event | Heat | | Semifinal | | Final | |
| Athlete | Event | Result | Rank | Result | Rank | Result | Rank |
|---|---|---|---|---|---|---|---|
| Mike Mokamba | 200 m | DNS | | Did not advance | | | |
| Carvin Nkanata | 200 m | 21.43 | 8 | Did not advance | | | |
| Raymond Kibet | 400 m | 46.15 | 5 | Did not advance | | | |
| Alphas Kishoyian | 400 m | 46.74 | 6 | Did not advance | | | |
| Alex Sampao | 400 m | 46.62 | 7 | Did not advance | | | |
| Alfred Kipketer | 800 m | 1:46.61 | 1 Q | 1:44.38 | 1 Q | 1:46.02 | 7 |
| Ferguson Rotich | 800 m | 1:46.00 | 2 Q | 1:44.65 | 4 q | 1:43.55 | 5 |
| David Rudisha | 800 m | 1:45.09 | 1 Q | 1:43.88 | 1 Q | 1:42.15 | 1st place, gold medalist(s) |
| Asbel Kiprop | 1500 m | 3:38.97 | 1 Q | 3:39.73 | 1 Q | 3:50.87 | 6 |
| Ronald Kwemoi | 1500 m | 3:38.33 | 2 Q | 3:39.42 | 1 Q | 3:56.76 | 13 |
| Elijah Manangoi | 1500 m | 3:46.83 | 2 Q | DNS | | Did not advance | |
| Isiah Koech | 5000 m | 13:25.15 | 12 | — | | Did not advance | |
| Charles Muneria | 5000 m | 13:30.95 | 12 | — | | Did not advance | |
| Caleb Ndiku | 5000 m | 13:26.63 | 6 | — | | Did not advance | |
| Geoffrey Kamworor | 10000 m | — | | | | 27:31.94 | 11 |
| Bedan Karoki Muchiri | 10000 m | — | | | | 27:22.93 | 5 |
| Paul Tanui | 10000 m | — | | | | 27:05.64 | 2nd place, silver medalist(s) |
| Nicholas Bett | 400 m hurdles | DSQ | | Did not advance | | | |
| Aron Koech | 400 m hurdles | 48.77 | 1 Q | 48.49 | 1 Q | 49.09 | 7 |
| Boniface Mucheru | 400 m hurdles | 48.91 | 2 Q | 48.85 | 2 Q | 47.78 NR | 2nd place, silver medalist(s) |
| Ezekiel Kemboi | 3000 m steeplechase | 8:25.51 | 3 Q | — | | DSQ | |
| Brimin Kipruto | 3000 m steeplechase | 8:26.25 | 2 Q | — | | 8:18.79 | 7 |
| Conseslus Kipruto | 3000 m steeplechase | 8:21.40 | 1 Q | — | | 8:03.28 OR | 1st place, gold medalist(s) |
| Stanley Biwott | Marathon | — | | | | DNF | |
| Eliud Kipchoge | Marathon | — | | | | 2:08:44 | 1st place, gold medalist(s) |
| Wesley Korir | Marathon | — | | | | DNF | |
| Samuel Gathimba | 20 km walk | — | | | | DNF | |
| Simon Wachira | 20 km walk | — | | | | DNF | |

Women

| Athlete | Event | Heat | | Semifinal | | Final | |
| Athlete | Event | Result | Rank | Result | Rank | Result | Rank |
|---|---|---|---|---|---|---|---|
| Winnie Chebet | 800 m | 2:01.65 | 2 Q | 2:01.90 | 6 | Did not advance | |
| Eunice Sum | 800 m | 1:59.83 | 1 Q | 2:00.88 | 7 | Did not advance | |
| Margaret Wambui | 800 m | 1:59.66 | 2 Q | 1:59.21 | 1 Q | 1:56.89 | 3rd place, bronze medalist(s) |
| Nancy Chepkwemoi | 1500 m | 4:15.41 | 11 | Did not advance | | | |
| Faith Kipyegon | 1500 m | 4:06.65 | 2 Q | 4:03.95 | 1 Q | 4:08.92 | 1st place, gold medalist(s) |
| Viola Cheptoo Lagat | 1500 m | 4:08.09 | 8 q | 4:06.83 | 6 | Did not advance | |
| Mercy Cherono | 5000 m | 15:19.56 | 3 Q | — | | 14:42.89 | 4 |
| Vivian Cheruiyot | 5000 m | 15:17.74 | 3 Q | — | | 14:26.17 OR | 1st place, gold medalist(s) |
| Hellen Obiri | 5000 m | 15:19.38 | 1 Q | — | | 14:29.77 | 2nd place, silver medalist(s) |
| Alice Aprot | 10000 m | — | | | | 29:53.51 | 4 |
| Vivian Cheruiyot | 10000 m | — | | | | 29:32.53 NR | 2nd place, silver medalist(s) |
| Betsy Saina | 10000 m | — | | | | 30:07.78 | 5 |
| Maureen Jelagat | 400 m hurdles | 57.97 | 8 | Did not advance | | | |
| Beatrice Chepkoech | 3000 m steeplechase | 9:17.55 | 1 Q | — | | 9:16.05 | 4 |
| Hyvin Jepkemoi | 3000 m steeplechase | 9:24.61 | 1 Q | — | | 9:07.12 | 2nd place, silver medalist(s) |
| Lydia Rotich | 3000 m steeplechase | 9:30.21 | 5 q | — | | 9:29.90 | 13 |
| Visiline Jepkesho | Marathon | — | | | | 2:46:05 | 86 |
| Helah Kiprop | Marathon | — | | | | DNF | |
| Jemima Sumgong | Marathon | — | | | | 2:24:04 | 1st place, gold medalist(s) |
| Grace Wanjiru | 20 km walk | — | | | | 1:37:49 | 42 |

Field events

| Athlete | Event | Qualification | | Final | |
| Athlete | Event | Distance | Position | Distance | Position |
|---|---|---|---|---|---|
| Julius Yego | Men's javelin throw | 83.55 | 5 Q | 88.24 | 2nd place, silver medalist(s) |

== Boxing ==
Kenya has entered three boxers to compete in each of the following weight classes into the Olympic boxing tournament. Rayton Okwiri had claimed his Olympic spot with a semifinal victory at the 2016 African Qualification Tournament in Yaoundé, Cameroon. Meanwhile, light flyweight boxer Peter Mungai Warui had received a spare Olympic berth as the next highest-ranked boxer, not yet qualified, in the same meet, due to South Africa's decision not to accept spots through the continental qualifier.

Bantamweight boxer and London 2012 Olympian Benson Gicharu rounded out the Kenyan roster with his semifinal triumph at the 2016 APB and WSB Olympic Qualifier in Vargas, Venezuela.

| Athlete | Event | Round of 32 | Round of 16 | Quarterfinals | Semifinals | Final | |
| Athlete | Event | Opposition Result | Opposition Result | Opposition Result | Opposition Result | Opposition Result | Rank |
|---|---|---|---|---|---|---|---|
| Peter Mungai Warui | Men's light flyweight | Bye | Lü B (CHN); W 2–1 | Argilagos (CUB); L 0–3 | Did not advance | | |
| Benson Gicharu | Men's bantamweight | Erdenebat (MGL); L 0–3 | Did not advance | | | | |
| Rayton Okwiri | Men's welterweight | Zamkovoy (RUS); W 2–1 | Rabii (MAR); L 0–3 | Did not advance | | | |

== Judo ==
Kenya has qualified one judoka for the men's middleweight category (90 kg) at the Games, signifying the nation's Olympic comeback to the sport for the first time since 1992. Kiplangat Sang earned a continental quota spot from the African region, as the highest-ranked Kenyan judoka outside of direct qualifying position in the IJF World Ranking List of May 30, 2016.

| Athlete | Event | Round of 64 | Round of 32 | Round of 16 | Quarterfinals | Semifinals | Repechage | Final / BM | |
| Athlete | Event | Opposition Result | Opposition Result | Opposition Result | Opposition Result | Opposition Result | Opposition Result | Opposition Result | Rank |
|---|---|---|---|---|---|---|---|---|---|
| Kiplangat Sang | Men's −90 kg | Bye | Tóth (HUN); L 000–100 | Did not advance | | | | | |

== Rugby sevens ==
=== Men's tournament ===
Kenyan men's rugby sevens team qualified for the Olympics by winning the 2015 Africa Cup Sevens in Johannesburg, South Africa.

Team roster

The following is the Kenya roster in the men's rugby sevens tournament of the 2016 Summer Olympics - age represents each players age when the Olympics took place.

Head coach: Benjamin Ayimba

| No. | Pos. | Player | Date of birth (age) | Events | Points | Union |
|---|---|---|---|---|---|---|
| 1 | BK | Oscar Ayodi | 21 September 1989 (aged 26) | 26 | 180 | (Kenya) Homeboyz |
| 2 | FW | Bush Mwale | 14 November 1993 (aged 22) | 13 | 75 | (Kenya) Homeboyz |
| 3 | FW | Oscar Ouma Achieng | 3 May 1989 (aged 27) | 32 | 320 | (Kenya) Nakuru |
| 4 | BK | Lugonzo Ligamy | 29 July 1992 (aged 24) | 10 | 51 | (Kenya) Homeboyz |
| 5 | BK | Billy Odhiambo | 7 November 1993 (aged 22) | 27 | 250 | (Kenya) Strathmore University |
| 6 | FW | Humphrey Kayange | 20 July 1982 (aged 34) | 67 | 799 | (Kenya) Mwamba |
| 7 | BK | Biko Adema | 1 September 1987 (aged 28) | 53 | 702 | (Kenya) Nondescripts |
| 8 | FW | Andrew Amonde (c) | 25 December 1983 (aged 32) | 48 | 170 | Kenya Commercial Bank |
| 9 | FW | Dennis Ombachi | 14 December 1991 (aged 24) | 22 | 130 | (Kenya) Mwamba |
| 10 | BK | Samuel Oliech | 15 December 1993 (aged 22) | 6 | 99 | (Kenya) Impala Saracens |
| 11 | BK | Collins Injera | 18 October 1986 (aged 29) | 66 | 1,211 | (Kenya) Mwamba |
| 12 | FW | Willy Ambaka | 14 May 1990 (aged 26) | 29 | 325 | Kenya Harlequin |

Group play

| Pos | Team | Pld | W | D | L | PF | PA | PD | Pts | Qualification |
|---|---|---|---|---|---|---|---|---|---|---|
| 1 | Great Britain | 3 | 3 | 0 | 0 | 73 | 45 | +28 | 9 | Quarter-finals |
| 2 | Japan | 3 | 2 | 0 | 1 | 64 | 40 | +24 | 7 | Quarter-finals |
| 3 | New Zealand | 3 | 1 | 0 | 2 | 59 | 40 | +19 | 5 | Quarter-finals |
| 4 | Kenya | 3 | 0 | 0 | 3 | 19 | 90 | −71 | 3 | |

Source: World Rugby
Rules for classification: 1) Points; 2) Head-to-head result; 3) Point difference; 4) Points scored.

9 August 2016
12:00

| Great Britain | 31–7 | Kenya |
| Try: Norton 2' m Burgess 4' c Bibby (2) 6' m, 12' c Bennett 7' c Con: Mitchell (3/4); Bibby (0/1) | Report (Rio 2016); Report (World Rugby) | Try: Odhiambo 8' c Con: Adema (1/1) |

Deodoro Stadium, Rio de Janeiro
Referee: Alexandre Ruiz (France)

9 August 2016
17:30

| New Zealand | 28–5 | Kenya |
| Try: Penalty try 3' c Ioane 4' c Pulu 11' c Ormond 14' c Con: Pulu (3/3); Kaka (1/1) | Report (Rio 2016); Report (World Rugby) | Try: Injera 1' m Con: Adema (0/1) |

Deodoro Stadium, Rio de Janeiro
Referee: Federico Anselmi (Argentina)

10 August 2016
12:00

| Kenya | 7–31 | Japan |
| Try: Injera 4' c Con: Oliech (1/1) | Report (Rio 2016); Report (World Rugby) | Try: Hano 1' c Lemeki (2) 7' c, 13' m Goya 9' m Penalty try 11' c Con: Goya (3/5) |

Deodoro Stadium, Rio de Janeiro
Referee: Matthew O'Brien (Australia)

Classification semifinal (9–12)

10 August 2016
16:30

| Spain | 14–12 | Kenya |
| Try: Poggi (2) 7' c, 8' c Con: Hernández (2/2) | Report (Rio 2016); Report (World Rugby) | Try: Amonde 4' m Odhiambo 12' c Con: Adema (0/1); Oliech (1/1) 12' |

Deodoro Stadium, Rio de Janeiro
Referee: Taku Otsuki (Japan)

Eleventh place match

11 August 2016
12:30

| Brazil | 0–24 | Kenya |
| | Report (Rio 2016); Report (World Rugby) | Try: Odhiambo (3) 1' m, 6' c, 10 c Ambaka 8' m Con: Oliech (1/2); Injera (0/1); Adema (1/1) |

Deodoro Stadium, Rio de Janeiro
Referee: Alexandre Ruiz (France)

=== Women's tournament ===
Kenyan women's rugby sevens team qualified for the Olympics by attaining a runner-up finish at the 2015 Women's Africa Cup Sevens in Johannesburg, as the qualifying winners South Africa decided not to accept their Olympic berth.

Team roster

The following is the Kenya roster in the women's rugby sevens tournament of the 2016 Summer Olympics.

Head coach: Michael Mulima

| Backs | | Forwards |
|---|---|---|---|
| 4 | Rachael Mbogo | 1 | Stacy Otieno |
| 5 | Linet Arasa | 2 | Janet Awino |
| 7 | Doreen Nziwa | 3 | Sheila Chajira |
| 8 | Janet Okelo | 6 | Camilyne Oyuayo |
| 9 | Irene Otieno | 12 | Philadelphia Olando |
| 10 | Catherine Abilla (c) |
| 11 | Celestine Masinde |

Group play

| Pos | Team | Pld | W | D | L | PF | PA | PD | Pts | Qualification |
|---|---|---|---|---|---|---|---|---|---|---|
| 1 | New Zealand | 3 | 3 | 0 | 0 | 109 | 12 | +97 | 9 | Quarter-finals |
| 2 | France | 3 | 2 | 0 | 1 | 71 | 40 | +31 | 7 | Quarter-finals |
| 3 | Spain | 3 | 1 | 0 | 2 | 31 | 65 | −34 | 5 | Quarter-finals |
| 4 | Kenya | 3 | 0 | 0 | 3 | 17 | 111 | −94 | 3 | |

Source: World Rugby
Rules for classification: 1) Points; 2) Head-to-head result; 3) Point difference; 4) Points scored.

6 August 2016
11:30

| New Zealand | 52–0 | Kenya |
| Try: Woodman (3) 1' c, 8' c, 13' m McAlister (2) 3' c, 14' m Manuel 6' c Broughton 10' c Williams 14' c Con: Nathan-Wong (5/6); Brazier (1/2) | Report (Rio 2016); Report (World Rugby) |

Deodoro Stadium, Rio de Janeiro
Referee: Sara Cox (Great Britain)

6 August 2016
16:00

| France | 40–7 | Kenya |
| Try: Ladagnous (2) 4' c, 14' m Le Pesq 7' c Horta 8' c Guérin 11' c Amiel 14' c Con: Le Pesq (4/5); Biscarat (1/1) | Report (Rio 2016); Report (World Rugby) | Try: Masinde 7' c Con: Awino (1/1) |

Deodoro Stadium, Rio de Janeiro
Referee: Alhambra Nievas (Spain)

7 August 2016
11:00

| Spain | 19–10 | Kenya |
| Try: Plà 1' m Bravo (2) 9' c, 12' c Con: P. García (2/3) | Report (Rio 2016); Report (World Rugby) | Try: Nziwa 6' m Okelo 14' m Con: Awino (0/2) |

Deodoro Stadium, Rio de Janeiro
Referee: James Bolabiu (Fiji)

Classification semifinal (9–12)

7 August 2016
16:30

| Kenya | 0–24 | Japan |
| | Report (Rio 2016); Report (World Rugby) | Try: Yamaguchi (2) 2' m, 6' c Kuwai 8' m Kanematsu 13' c Con: Okuroda (1/2); Yamanaka (1/2) |

Deodoro Stadium, Rio de Janeiro
Referee: Aimee Barrett (South Africa)

Eleventh place match

8 August 2016
12:30

| Colombia | 10–22 | Kenya |
| Try: S. Acevedo 1' m Medina 7' m Con: Lopera (0/2) | Report (Rio 2016); Report (World Rugby) | Try: Okelo (2) 4' m, 11' c I. Otieno 9' m Masinde 14' m Con: Awino (1/3); Nziwa (0/1) |

Deodoro Stadium, Rio de Janeiro
Referee: Rose Labreche (Canada)

== Swimming ==
Kenya has received a Universality invitation from FINA to send two swimmers (one male and one female) to the Olympics.

| Athlete | Event | Heat | | Semifinal | | Final | |
| Athlete | Event | Time | Rank | Time | Rank | Time | Rank |
|---|---|---|---|---|---|---|---|
| Hamdan Bayusuf | Men's 100 m backstroke | 1:00.28 | 38 | Did not advance | | | |
| Talisa Lanoe | Women's 100 m backstroke | 1:10.02 | 33 | Did not advance | | | |

== Weightlifting ==
Kenya has received an unused quota place from IWF to send a male weightlifter to the Olympics.

| Athlete | Event | Snatch | | Clean & Jerk | | Total | Rank |
| Athlete | Event | Result | Rank | Result | Rank | Total | Rank |
|---|---|---|---|---|---|---|---|
| James Adede | Men's −94 kg | 116 | 17 | 140 | 17 | 256 | 17 |

== See also ==
- Kenya at the 2016 Summer Paralympics
