= Rugby sevens at the 2018 Commonwealth Games – Women's team rosters =

This article shows the rosters of all participating teams at the women's rugby sevens tournament at the 2018 Commonwealth Games in Gold Coast, Queensland.

== Pool A ==
=== Australia ===
The following team was announced as the 2018 Commonwealth Games sevens team.

Head coach: Tim Walsh

No.	Pos.	Player	Date of birth (age)	Union / Club
1	FW	Shannon Parry (co-c)	October 27, 1989 (aged 28)	Queensland
2	FW	Sharni Williams (co-c)	March 2, 1988 (aged 30)	Australian Capital Territory
3	BK	Demi Hayes	May 28, 1998 (aged 19)	Queensland
4	BK	Dominique du Toit	May 19, 1997 (aged 20)	Queensland
5	BK	Emma Tonegato	April 20, 1995 (aged 22)	New South Wales
6	FW	Vani Pelite	July 12, 1995 (aged 22)	Queensland
7	BK	Charlotte Caslick	March 9, 1995 (aged 23)	Queensland
8	FW	Cassie Staples	October 16, 1992 (aged 25)	New South Wales
9	FW	Emma Sykes	June 26, 1998 (aged 19)	Queensland
10	BK	Alicia Quirk	March 28, 1992 (aged 26)	New South Wales
11	BK	Emilee Cherry	November 2, 1992 (aged 25)	Queensland
12	BK	Ellia Green	February 20, 1993 (aged 25)	Victoria
13		Georgie Friedrichs (reserve)	April 14, 1995 (aged 23)	Queensland

=== Canada ===
The following team was announced as the 2018 Commonwealth Games sevens team.

Head coach: John Tait

No.	Pos.	Player	Date of birth (age)	Union / Club
1	BK	Brittany Benn	April 23, 1989 (aged 28)	Guelph Redcoats
2	BK	Kayla Moleschi	November 25, 1990 (aged 27)	Williams Lake Rustlers
3	FW	Caroline Crossley	April 19, 1998 (aged 19)	Castaway Wanderers
4	BK	Breanne Nicholas	February 20, 1994 (aged 24)	London St. Georges RFC
5	BK	Julia Greenshields	February 12, 1992 (aged 26)	Sarnia Saints
6	BK	Charity Williams	October 20, 1992 (aged 25)	Markham Irish
7	FW	Sara Kaljuvee	February 7, 1993 (aged 25)	Toronto Scottish
8	FW	Bianca Farella	April 10, 1992 (aged 26)	Town of Mont Royal RFC
9	BK	Ghislaine Landry (c)	April 27, 1988 (aged 29)	Toronto Scottish
10	FW	Hannah Darling	May 30, 1996 (aged 21)	Peterborough Pagans
11	BK	Natasha Watcham-Roy	April 28, 1992 (aged 25)	Hull Volant
12	BK	Megan Lukan	February 14, 1992 (aged 26)	Unattached

=== South Africa ===
The following team was announced as the 2018 Commonwealth Games sevens team.

Head coach: Paul Delport

No.	Pos.	Player	Date of birth (age)	Union / Club
1	FW	Zinhle Ndawonde	May 22, 1989 (aged 28)	
2	FW	Nomsa Mokwai	August 30, 1992 (aged 25)	
3	BK	Chane Stadler	March 30, 1994 (aged 24)	
4	BK	Zintle Mpupha (c)	December 25, 1993 (aged 24)	
5	BK	Zenay Jordaan	April 4, 1991 (aged 27)	
6	FW	Veroeshka Grain	December 11, 1991 (aged 26)	
7	BK	Eloise Webb	March 5, 1996 (aged 22)	
8	BK	Megan Comley	March 11, 1988 (aged 30)	
9	BK	Nadine Roos	May 9, 1996 (aged 21)	
10	BK	Mathrin Simmers	March 3, 1988 (aged 30)	
11	FW	Unathi Mali	December 3, 1989 (aged 28)	
12	FW	Marithy Pienaar	August 26, 1991 (aged 26)	
13		Aseza Hele	November 26, 1994 (aged 23)	

=== Kenya ===
The following team was announced as the 2018 Commonwealth Games sevens team.

Head coach: Kevin Wambua

No.	Pos.	Player	Date of birth (age)	Union / Club
1	FW	Stacy Otieno	September 27, 1990 (aged 27)	
2	FW	Linet Arasa	January 1, 1996 (aged 22)	
3	FW	Sheila Chajira	December 20, 1993 (aged 24)	
4	FW	Rachael Mbogo	December 20, 1982 (aged 35)	
5	BK	Grace Okulu	March 16, 1998 (aged 20)	
6	BK	Cynthia Atieno	April 17, 1995 (aged 22)	
7	BK	Doreen Remour	July 4, 1982 (aged 35)	
8	BK	Michelle Omondi	May 10, 1991 (aged 26)	
9	BK	Janet Okelo	May 5, 1992 (aged 25)	
11	BK	Celestine Masinde	January 12, 1987 (aged 31)	
12	FW	Philadelphia Olando (c)	February 18, 1990 (aged 28)	
13	BK	Judith Okumu	July 12, 1998 (aged 19)	

== Pool B ==
=== New Zealand ===
The following team was announced as the 2018 Commonwealth Games sevens team. Ruby Tui was originally in the squad, but was ruled out after contracting mumps.

Head coach: Allan Bunting

No.	Pos.	Player	Date of birth (age)	Union / Club
1	FW	Alena Saili	December 13, 1998 (aged 19)	
2	FW	Shakira Baker	January 4, 1992 (aged 26)	Waikato
3	FW	Stacey Waaka	November 3, 1995 (aged 22)	Waikato
4	BK	Niall Williams	April 21, 1988 (aged 29)	Auckland
5	FW	Sarah Goss (c)	December 9, 1992 (aged 25)	Manawatu
6	BK	Michaela Blyde	December 21, 1995 (aged 22)	Bay of Plenty
7	BK	Tyla Nathan-Wong	July 1, 1994 (aged 23)	Auckland
8	BK	Kelly Brazier	October 28, 1989 (aged 28)	Bay of Plenty
9	BK	Gayle Broughton	June 5, 1996 (aged 21)	Bay of Plenty
10	FW	Theresa Fitzpatrick	February 25, 1995 (aged 23)	Auckland
11	FW	Portia Woodman	July 12, 1991 (aged 26)	Counties Manukau
12	BK	Tenika Willison	December 7, 1997 (aged 20)	Waikato
13	BK	Risi Pouri-Lane (reserve)	May 28, 2000 (aged 17)	

=== England ===
The following team was announced as the 2018 Commonwealth Games sevens team.

Head coach: James Bailey

No.	Pos.	Player	Date of birth (age)	Union / Club
1	BK	Claire Allan	May 7, 1985 (aged 32)	
2	BK	Abbie Brown (c)	April 10, 1996 (aged 22)	
3	BK	Lydia Thompson	February 10, 1992 (aged 26)	
4	FW	Emily Scarratt	February 8, 1990 (aged 28)	
5	BK	Natasha Hunt	March 21, 1989 (aged 29)	
6	FW	Deborah Fleming	June 10, 1991 (aged 26)	
7	FW	Heather Fisher	June 13, 1984 (aged 33)	
8	BK	Emily Scott	June 30, 1992 (aged 25)	
9	FW	Alex Matthews	August 3, 1993 (aged 24)	
10	BK	Megan Jones	October 23, 1996 (aged 21)	
11	BK	Jess Breach	November 4, 1997 (aged 20)	
12	FW	Amy Wilson-Hardy	September 13, 1991 (aged 26)	
13	FW	Victoria Fleetwood	April 13, 1990 (aged 28)	

=== Fiji ===
The following team was announced as the 2018 Commonwealth Games sevens team.

Head coach: Iliesa Tanivula

No.	Pos.	Player	Date of birth (age)	Union / Club
1	FW	Litia Naiqato	March 25, 1987 (aged 31)	
2	FW	Miriama Naiobasali	December 30, 1995 (aged 22)	
3	FW	Ana Naimasi	February 21, 1994 (aged 24)	
4	BK	Viniana Riwai	June 6, 1991 (aged 26)	
5	BK	Vasiti Solikoviti	August 2, 1993 (aged 24)	
6	FW	Pricilla Siata	May 13, 1986 (aged 31)	
7	FW	Rusila Nagasau	August 4, 1987 (aged 30)	
8	BK	Ana Maria Roqica (c)	February 2, 1988 (aged 30)	
9	BK	Lavenia Tinai	September 7, 1990 (aged 27)	
10	BK	Luisa Tisolo	September 20, 1991 (aged 26)	
11	BK	Lavena Cavuru	June 28, 1994 (aged 23)	
12	BK	Timaima Ravisa	May 1, 1988 (aged 29)	
13		Elenoa Naimata		

=== Wales ===
The following team was announced as the 2018 Commonwealth Games sevens team. Alisha Butchers and Captain Philippa Tuttiett were both originally in the squad but were ruled out with injuries.

Head coach: Nick Wakley

No.	Pos.	Player	Date of birth (age)	Union / Club
1	BK	Jasmine Joyce	October 9, 1995 (aged 22)	
2	BK	Sinead Breeze	October 26, 1989 (aged 28)	
3	BK	Kayleigh Powell	February 18, 1999 (aged 19)	
4	BK	Elinor Snowsill	June 27, 1989 (aged 28)	Bristol Ladies
5	BK	Laurie Harries	October 24, 1989 (aged 28)	
6	FW	Lucy Packer		
7	FW	Bethan Lewis	February 19, 1999 (aged 19)	
8	BK	Hannah Jones	November 14, 1996 (aged 21)	
9	FW	Gemma Rowland	February 7, 1989 (aged 29)	
10	FW	Sian Williams (c)	October 26, 1990 (aged 27)	
11	FW	Sioned Harries	November 22, 1989 (aged 28)	
12	FW	Shona Powell-Hughes	July 8, 1991 (aged 26)	
