= Spain at the 2016 Summer Olympics =

- IOC code: ESP
- NOC: Spanish Olympic Committee
- Website: www.coe.es (in Spanish)

in Rio de Janeiro
- Competitors: 305 in 27 sports
- Flag bearers: Rafael Nadal (opening); Jesús Ángel García (closing)
- Medals Ranked 14th: Gold 7 Silver 4 Bronze 6 Total 17

Summer Olympics appearances (overview)
- 1900; 1904–1912; 1920; 1924; 1928; 1932; 1936; 1948; 1952; 1956; 1960; 1964; 1968; 1972; 1976; 1980; 1984; 1988; 1992; 1996; 2000; 2004; 2008; 2012; 2016; 2020; 2024; 2028

Spain, represented by the Spanish Olympic Committee (COE), competed at the 2016 Summer Olympics in Rio de Janeiro, Brazil, from 5 to 21 August 2016. Since the nation's official debut in 1920, Spanish athletes have appeared in every edition of the Summer Olympic Games except for two; the 1936 Summer Olympics in Nazi Germany, and the 1956 Summer Olympics in Melbourne, as a protest against the Soviet invasion of Hungary. The Spanish Olympic Committee sent a total of 306 athletes, 163 men and 143 women, to compete in 25 sports.

== Medalists ==
Medal	Name	Sport	Event	Date
Gold	Mireia Belmonte	Swimming	Women's 200 m butterfly	10 August
Gold	Maialen Chourraut	Canoeing	Women's slalom K-1	11 August
Gold	Marc López; Rafael Nadal	Tennis	Men's doubles	12 August
Gold	Marcus Walz	Canoeing	Men's K-1 1000 m	16 August
Gold	Saúl Craviotto; Cristian Toro	Canoeing	Men's K-2 200 m	18 August
Gold	Carolina Marín	Badminton	Women's singles	19 August
Gold	Ruth Beitia	Athletics	Women's high jump	20 August
Silver	Orlando Ortega	Athletics	Men's 110 m hurdles	16 August
Silver	Eva Calvo	Taekwondo	Women's 57 kg	18 August
Silver	Spain women's national basketball team: Anna Cruz; Silvia Domínguez; Laura Gil; Astou Ndour; Laura Nicholls; Laia Palau; Lucila Pascua; Laura Quevedo; Leonor Rodríguez; Leticia Romero; Alba Torrens; Marta Xargay	Basketball	Women's tournament	20 August
Silver	Sandra Aguilar; Artemi Gavezou; Elena López; Lourdes Mohedano; Alejandra Quereda	Gymnastics	Women's rhythmic group all-around	21 August
Bronze	Mireia Belmonte	Swimming	Women's 400 m individual medley	6 August
Bronze	Lydia Valentín	Weightlifting	Women's 75 kg	12 August
Bronze	Joel González	Taekwondo	Men's 68 kg	18 August
Bronze	Saúl Craviotto	Canoeing	Men's K-1 200 metres	20 August
Bronze	Spain men's national basketball team: Álex Abrines; José Calderón; Víctor Claver; Rudy Fernández; Pau Gasol; Willy Hernangómez; Sergio Llull; Nikola Mirotić; Juan Carlos Navarro; Felipe Reyes; Sergio Rodríguez; Ricky Rubio	Basketball	Men's tournament	21 August
Bronze	Carlos Coloma	Cycling	Men's cross-country	21 August

Medals by sport
Sport	1st place, gold medalist(s)	2nd place, silver medalist(s)	3rd place, bronze medalist(s)	Total
Canoeing	3	0	1	4
Athletics	1	1	0	2
Swimming	1	0	1	2
Badminton	1	0	0	1
Tennis	1	0	0	1
Basketball	0	1	1	2
Taekwondo	0	1	1	2
Gymnastics	0	1	0	1
Cycling	0	0	1	1
Weightlifting	0	0	1	1
Total	7	4	6	17

Medals by gender
Gender	1st place, gold medalist(s)	2nd place, silver medalist(s)	3rd place, bronze medalist(s)	Total
Female	4	3	2	9
Male	3	1	4	8
Total	7	4	6	17

== Competitors ==
The following is the list of number of competitors participating in the Games. Note that reserves in fencing, field hockey, football, and handball are not counted as athletes:

Sport	Men	Women	Total	Events
Archery	3	1	4	3
Athletics	29	18	47	28
Badminton	1	1	2	2
Basketball	12	12	24	2
Boxing	2	0	2	2
Canoeing	9	2	11	8
Cycling	9	3	12	8
Equestrian	7	2	9	5
Field hockey	16	16	32	2
Golf	2	2	4	2
Gymnastics	2	7	9	5
Handball	0	14	14	1
Judo	2	3	5	5
Rowing	2	2	4	2
Rugby sevens	12	12	24	2
Sailing	7	7	14	9
Shooting	4	2	6	8
Swimming	13	11	24	24
Synchronized swimming	—	2	2	1
Table tennis	1	2	3	2
Taekwondo	2	1	3	3
Tennis	5	4	9	5
Triathlon	3	3	6	2
Volleyball	2	2	4	2
Water polo	13	13	26	2
Weightlifting	3	1	4	4
Wrestling	1	0	1	1
Total	162	143	305	140

== Archery ==
Three Spanish archers qualified for the men's events after having secured a top eight finish in the team recurve at the 2015 World Archery Championships in Copenhagen, Denmark. Meanwhile, one Spanish archer was added to the squad by virtue of a top six national finish in the women's individual recurve at the 2016 Archery World Cup meet in Antalya, Turkey.

Athlete	Event	Ranking round		Round of 64	Round of 32	Round of 16	Quarterfinals	Semifinals	Final / BM	
Athlete	Event	Score	Seed	Opposition Score	Opposition Score	Opposition Score	Opposition Score	Opposition Score	Opposition Score	Rank
Miguel Alvariño	Men's individual	651	44	Daniel (FRA); W 6–0	Lee S-y (KOR); L 1–7	Did not advance				
Antonio Fernández	Men's individual	657	35	Kao H-w (TPE); W 6–0	Pasqualucci (ITA); W 6–2	Worth (AUS); L 3–7	Did not advance			
Juan Ignacio Rodríguez	Men's individual	678	10	Nor Hasrin (MAS); W 6–0	Ramaekers (BEL); W 6–0	Furukawa (JPN); L 3–7	Did not advance			
Miguel Alvariño; Antonio Fernández; Juan Ignacio Rodríguez	Men's team	1986	8	—N/a		Netherlands; L 1–5	Did not advance			
Adriana Martín	Women's individual	630	32	Le C-y (TPE); L 2–6	Did not advance					

== Athletics ==
Spanish athletes have so far achieved qualifying standards in the following athletics events (up to a maximum of 3 athletes in each event): In the last quarter of 2015, four Spanish track and field athletes have been selected to the Olympic team by the Spanish Athletics Federation based on their outstanding performances at the IAAF World Championships.

Key

- Note–Ranks given for track events are within the athlete's heat only
- Q = Qualified for the next round
- q = Qualified for the next round as a fastest loser or, in field events, by position without achieving the qualifying target
- qr = Qualify repechaged for the next round because a race incident
- NR = National record
- N/A = Round not applicable for the event
- Bye = Athlete not required to compete in round

Track & road events
Men

Athlete	Event	Heat		Semifinal		Final	
Athlete	Event	Result	Rank	Result	Rank	Result	Rank
Bruno Hortelano	200 m	20.12 NR	1 Q	20.16	4	Did not advance	
Daniel Andújar	800 m	1:48.50	4	Did not advance			
Álvaro de Arriba	800 m	1:46.86	4	Did not advance			
Kevin López	800 m	1:53.41	8	Did not advance			
David Bustos	1500 m	3:39.73	7 q	3:56.54	11 qr	3:51.06	7
Adel Mechaal	1500 m	3:48.41	9	Did not advance			
Adel Mechaal	5000 m	13:34.42	17	—N/a		Did not advance	
Antonio Abadía	5000 m	14:33.20	22	—N/a		Did not advance	
Ilias Fifa	5000 m	13:30.23	9	—N/a		Did not advance	
Yidiel Contreras	110 m hurdles	13.62	5 q	13.54	6	Did not advance	
Orlando Ortega	110 m hurdles	13.32	1 Q	13.32	1 Q	13.17	2nd place, silver medalist(s)
Sergio Fernández	400 m hurdles	49.31	5 q	48.87 NR	3	Did not advance	
Fernando Carro	3000 m steeplechase	8:34.45	10	—N/a		Did not advance	
Sebastián Martos	3000 m steeplechase	8:28.44	5	—N/a		Did not advance	
Abdelaziz Merzougui	3000 m steeplechase	9:03.40	15	—N/a		Did not advance	
Carles Castillejo	Marathon	—N/a				2:18:34	49
Jesús España	Marathon	—N/a				2:20:08	65
Francisco Arcilla	20 km walk	—N/a				1:27.50	55
Álvaro Martín	20 km walk	—N/a				1:22.11	22
Miguel Ángel López	20 km walk	—N/a				1:20.58	11
Miguel Ángel López	50 km walk	—N/a				DNF	
José Ignacio Díaz	50 km walk	—N/a				DNF	
Jesús Ángel García	50 km walk	—N/a				3:54:29	20

Women

Athlete	Event	Heat		Semifinal		Final	
Athlete	Event	Result	Rank	Result	Rank	Result	Rank
Estela García	200 m	23.43	6	Did not advance			
Aauri Bokesa	400 m	53.51	6	Did not advance			
Esther Guerrero	800 m	2:01.85	3	Did not advance			
Trihas Gebre	10000 m	—N/a				32:09.67	29
Caridad Jerez	100 m hurdles	13.26	6	Did not advance			
Diana Martín	3000 m steeplechase	9:44.07	12	—N/a		Did not advance	
Alessandra Aguilar	Marathon	—N/a				DNF	
Azucena Díaz	Marathon	—N/a				2:35:02	34
Estela Navascués	Marathon	—N/a				DNF	
Raquel González	20 km walk	—N/a				1:33:03	20
Beatriz Pascual	20 km walk	—N/a				1:30:24	8
Júlia Takács	20 km walk	—N/a				1:35:45	33

Field events
Men

Athlete	Event	Qualification		Final	
Athlete	Event	Distance	Position	Distance	Position
Jean Marie Okutu	Long jump	7.75	20	Did not advance	
Pablo Torrijos	Triple jump	16.11	31	Did not advance	
Carlos Tobalina	Shot put	19.98	17	Did not advance	
Borja Vivas	Shot put	20.25	14	Did not advance	
Frank Casañas	Discus throw	59.96	25	Did not advance	
Lois Maikel Martínez	Discus throw	59.42	27	Did not advance	
Javier Cienfuegos	Hammer throw	69.73	27	Did not advance	

Women

Athlete	Event	Qualification		Final	
Athlete	Event	Distance	Position	Distance	Position
Ruth Beitia	High jump	1.94	=1 Q	1.97	1st place, gold medalist(s)
Juliet Itoya	Long jump	6.35	22	Did not advance	
María del Mar Jover	Long jump	5.90	36	Did not advance	
Concepción Montaner	Long jump	6.32	24	Did not advance	
Patricia Sarrapio	Triple jump	13.35	32	Did not advance	
Sabina Asenjo	Discus throw	56.94	23	Did not advance	

Combined events – Men's decathlon

Athlete	Event	100 m	LJ	SP	HJ	400 m	110H	DT	PV	JT	1500 m	Final	Rank
Pau Tonnesen	Result	11.32	7.33	13.69	2.01	50.81	14.99	46.31	5.20	60.15	4:46.27	7982	17
Pau Tonnesen	Points	791	893	709	813	778	851	794	972	740	641	7982	17

== Badminton ==
Spain qualified two badminton players for each of the following events into the Olympic tournament. Two-time Olympian Pablo Abián and world no. 1 seed Carolina Marín were selected among the top 34 individual shuttlers each in the men's and women's singles based on the BWF World Rankings as of 5 May 2016.

Athlete	Event	Group stage			Elimination	Quarterfinal	Semifinal	Final / BM	
Athlete	Event	Opposition Score	Opposition Score	Rank	Opposition Score	Opposition Score	Opposition Score	Opposition Score	Rank
Pablo Abián	Men's singles	Yu Woon (BRU); W (21–12, 21–10)	Hu Y (HKG); L (18–21, 19–21)	2	Did not advance				
Carolina Marín	Women's singles	Vainio (FIN); W (21–6, 21–4)	Kjærsfeldt (DEN); W (21–16, 21–13)	1 Q	Bye	Sung J-h (KOR); W (21–12, 21–16)	Li Xr (CHN); W (21–14, 21–16)	Sindhu (IND); W (19–21, 21–12, 21–15)	1st place, gold medalist(s)

== Basketball ==
=== Men's tournament ===
Spain men's basketball team qualified for the Olympics by attaining a top two finish towards the final match of the EuroBasket 2015 in France.

Team roster

The following is the Spain roster in the men's basketball tournament of the 2016 Summer Olympics.

Spain men's national basketball team – 2016 Summer Olympics roster
Players
Coaches

Pos.	No.	Name	Age – Date of birth	Height	Club	Ctr.
C	4	Pau Gasol	36 – 6 June 1980	2.13 m (7 ft 0 in)	Chicago Bulls	(United States)
SF	5	Rudy Fernández	31 – 4 April 1985	1.97 m (6 ft 6 in)	Real Madrid	(Spain)
PG	6	Sergio Rodríguez	30 – 12 June 1986	1.90 m (6 ft 3 in)	Real Madrid	(Spain)
SG	7	Juan Carlos Navarro	36 – 13 June 1980	1.93 m (6 ft 4 in)	FC Barcelona Lassa	(Spain)
PG	8	José Manuel Calderón	34 – 28 September 1981	1.91 m (6 ft 3 in)	New York Knicks	(United States)
PF	9	Felipe Reyes	36 – 16 March 1980	2.06 m (6 ft 9 in)	Real Madrid	(Spain)
PF	10	Víctor Claver	27 – 30 August 1988	2.06 m (6 ft 9 in)	Lokomotiv Kuban	(Russia)
C	14	Willy Hernangómez	22 – 27 May 1994	2.10 m (6 ft 11 in)	Real Madrid	(Spain)
SF	21	Álex Abrines	23 – 1 August 1993	1.98 m (6 ft 6 in)	FC Barcelona Lassa	(Spain)
SG	23	Sergio Llull	28 – 15 November 1987	1.92 m (6 ft 4 in)	Real Madrid	(Spain)
PF	44	Nikola Mirotić	25 – 11 February 1991	2.08 m (6 ft 10 in)	Chicago Bulls	(United States)
PG	79	Ricky Rubio	25 – 21 October 1990	1.93 m (6 ft 4 in)	Minnesota Timberwolves	(United States)

Head coach

- (Italy) Sergio Scariolo

Assistant coach(es)

- (Spain) Jaume Ponsarnau
- (Spain) Txus Vidorreta
- (Spain) Ángel Sánchez-Cañete

Legend

- Club – describes last
  club before the tournament
- Age – describes age
  on 6 August 2016

Group play

Pos	Team	Pld	W	L	PF	PA	PD	Pts	Qualification
1	Croatia	5	3	2	400	407	−7	8 (Note: In games among the four teams at 3–2, Croatia and Spain were 2–1 while Argentina and Lithuania were 1–2. Croatia beat Spain 72–70, and Lithuania beat Argentina 81–73.)	Quarterfinals
2	Spain	5	3	2	432	357	+75	8	Quarterfinals
3	Lithuania	5	3	2	392	428	−36	8	Quarterfinals
4	Argentina	5	3	2	441	428	+13	8	Quarterfinals
5	Brazil (H)	5	2	3	411	407	+4	7	
6	Nigeria	5	1	4	392	441	−49	6	

Source: FIBA
Rules for classification: 1) points; 2) head-to-head points; 3) head-to-head points difference; 4) head-to-head number of points scored.
(H) Hosts
Notes:

7 August 2016
19:00

Boxscore

Croatia	72–70	Spain
Scoring by quarter: 13–21, 19–17, 15–16, 25–16
Pts: Bogdanović 23; Rebs: three players 7 Asts: Šarić 5		Pts: Gasol 26; Rebs: Gasol 9 Asts: Rodríguez 7

Carioca Arena 1, Rio de Janeiro
Attendance: 8,039
Referees: Stephen Seibel (CAN), Oļegs Latiševs (LAT), Robert Lottermoser (GER)

9 August 2016
14:15

Boxscore

Spain	65–66	Brazil
Scoring by quarter: 13–18, 18–16, 14–19, 20–13
Pts: Gasol 13; Rebs: Gasol 10; Asts: Rodríguez 5		Pts: Huertas 11; Rebs: Lima 10; Asts: Huertas 7

Carioca Arena 1, Rio de Janeiro
Attendance: 10,761
Referees: Ilija Belošević (SRB), Roberto Vázquez (PUR), Damir Javor (SLO)

11 August 2016
19:00

Boxscore

Nigeria	87–96	Spain
Scoring by quarter: 11–25, 30–18, 25–22, 21–31
Pts: Oguchi 24; Rebs: Diogu 7 Asts: Uzoh 7		Pts: Gasol 16; Rebs: Reyes 9 Asts: Llull 5

Carioca Arena 1, Rio de Janeiro
Attendance: 6,999
Referees: Steven Anderson (USA), José Reyes (MEX), Duan Zhu (CHN)

13 August 2016
19:00

Boxscore

Spain	109–59	Lithuania
Scoring by quarter: 26–11, 22–18, 36–16, 25–14
Pts: Gasol 23; Rebs: Reyes 9 Asts: Llull 6		Pts: Kuzminskas 17; Rebs: Valančiūnas 10; Asts: Mačiulis 2

Carioca Arena 1, Rio de Janeiro
Attendance: 11,045
Referees: Ilija Belošević (SRB), Roberto Vázquez (PUR), Oļegs Latiševs (LAT)

15 August 2016
19:00

Boxscore

Spain	92–73	Argentina
Scoring by quarter: 25–15, 23–20, 23–22, 21–16
Pts: Fernández 23; Rebs: Gasol 13; Asts: Llull, Rodríguez 5		Pts: Laprovíttola 21; Rebs: three players 5 Asts: Laprovíttola 4

Carioca Arena 1, Rio de Janeiro
Attendance: 10,949
Referees: Christos Christodoulou (GRE), Stephen Seibel (CAN), Roberto Vázquez (PUR)

Quarterfinal

17 August 2016
14:30

Boxscore

Spain	92–67	France
Scoring by quarter: 19–16, 24–14, 26–19, 23–18
Pts: Mirotić 23; Rebs: Gasol 8 Asts: Navarro 5		Pts: Parker 14; Rebs: Gobert 12; Asts: Diaw 5

Carioca Arena 1, Rio de Janeiro
Attendance: 9,725
Referees: José Reese (MEX), Damir Javor (SLO), Oļegs Latiševs (LAT)

Semifinal

19 August 2016
15:30

Boxscore

Spain	76–82	United States
Scoring by quarter: 17–26, 22–19, 18–21, 19–16
Pts: Gasol 23; Rebs: Gasol 8 Asts: Rodríguez 5		Pts: Thompson 22; Rebs: Jordan 16; Asts: Lowry, Thompson 3

Carioca Arena 1, Rio de Janeiro
Attendance: 10,455
Referees: Christos Christodoulou (GRE), José Reyes (MEX), Guilherme Locatelli (BRA)

Bronze medal game

21 August 2016
11:30

Boxscore

Australia	88–89	Spain
Scoring by quarter: 17–23, 21–17, 26–27, 24–22
Pts: Mills 30; Rebs: Lisch, Motum 6 Asts: Dellavedova 8		Pts: Gasol 31; Rebs: Gasol 11; Asts: Rodríguez 5

Carioca Arena 1, Rio de Janeiro
Attendance: 9,449
Referees: Ilija Belošević (SRB), Steven Anderson (USA), Roberto Vázquez (PUR)

=== Women's tournament ===
Spain women's basketball team qualified for the Olympics with a quarterfinal victory at the 2016 FIBA World Olympic Qualifying Tournament in Nantes, France.

Team roster

The following is the Spain roster in the women's basketball tournament of the 2016 Summer Olympics.

Spain women's national basketball team – 2016 Summer Olympics roster
Players
Coaches

Pos.	No.	Name	Age – Date of birth	Height	Club	Ctr.
G	2	Leticia Romero	21 – 28 May 1995	1.74 m (5 ft 9 in)	Florida State Seminoles	(United States)
C	4	Laura Nicholls	27 – 26 February 1989	1.90 m (6 ft 3 in)	Wisla Krakow	(Poland)
G	6	Silvia Domínguez	29 – 31 January 1987	1.67 m (5 ft 6 in)	Perfumerías Avenida	(Spain)
F	7	Alba Torrens	26 – 30 August 1989	1.91 m (6 ft 3 in)	UMMC Ekaterinburg	(Russia)
G	9	Laia Palau	36 – 10 September 1979	1.81 m (5 ft 11 in)	ZVVZ USK Praha	(Czech Republic)
F	10	Marta Xargay	25 – 20 December 1990	1.80 m (5 ft 11 in)	ZVVZ USK Praha	(Czech Republic)
F	11	Leonor Rodríguez	24 – 21 October 1991	1.80 m (5 ft 11 in)	Perfumerías Avenida	(Spain)
C	13	Lucila Pascua	33 – 21 March 1983	1.96 m (6 ft 5 in)	Mann Filter	(Spain)
F	15	Anna Cruz	29 – 27 October 1986	1.79 m (5 ft 10 in)	Nadezhda Orenburg	(Russia)
F	19	Laura Quevedo	20 – 15 April 1996	1.82 m (6 ft 0 in)	Star Center Uni Ferrol	(Spain)
C	24	Laura Gil	24 – 24 April 1992	1.91 m (6 ft 3 in)	Cadí La Seu	(Spain)
C	45	Astou Ndour	21 – 22 August 1994	1.96 m (6 ft 5 in)	Perfumerías Avenida	(Spain)

Head coach

- (Spain) Lucas Mondelo

Assistant coach(es)

- (Spain) Víctor Lapeña
- (Spain) Isabel Sánchez

Legend

- Club – describes last
  club before the tournament
- Age – describes age
  on 6 August 2016

Group play

Pos	Team	Pld	W	L	PF	PA	PD	Pts	Qualification
1	United States	5	5	0	520	316	+204	10	Quarter-finals
2	Spain	5	4	1	387	333	+54	9	Quarter-finals
3	Canada	5	3	2	340	347	−7	8	Quarter-finals
4	Serbia	5	2	3	385	406	−21	7	Quarter-finals
5	China	5	1	4	371	428	−57	6	
6	Senegal	5	0	5	309	482	−173	5	

Source: FIBA
Rules for classification: 1) points; 2) head-to-head points; 3) head-to-head points difference; 4) head-to-head number of points scored.

7 August 2016
14:15

Boxscore

Serbia	59–65	Spain
Scoring by quarter: 18–19, 13–12, 13–15, 15–19
Pts: Milovanović 17; Rebs: Petrović 8 Asts: A. Dabović 4		Pts: Xargay 15; Rebs: Ndour 12; Asts: Palau, Torrens 5

Youth Arena, Rio de Janeiro
Attendance: 2,654
Referees: Roberto Vázquez (PUR), Natalia Cuello (DOM), Piotr Pastusiak (POL)

8 August 2016
12:00

Boxscore

Spain	63–103	United States
Scoring by quarter: 14–29, 23–25, 14–20, 12–29
Pts: Torrens 20; Rebs: Ndour 8 Asts: Domínguez 3		Pts: Taurasi 13; Rebs: Charles 6 Asts: Bird, Charles 5

Youth Arena, Rio de Janeiro
Attendance: 2,073
Referees: Christos Christodoulou (GRE), Sreten Radović (CRO), Ahmed Al-Bulushi (OMA)

10 August 2016
12:15

Boxscore

China	68–89	Spain
Scoring by quarter: 18–14, 20–27, 21–23, 9–25
Pts: Shao 14; Rebs: Sun Mengr. 8 Asts: Chen 6		Pts: Torrens 32; Rebs: Nicholls 10; Asts: Palau 7

Youth Arena, Rio de Janeiro
Attendance: 1,230
Referees: Eddie Viator (FRA), Leandro Lezcano (ARG), Natalia Cuello (DOM)

12 August 2016
17:45

Boxscore

Spain	97–43	Senegal
Scoring by quarter: 26–11, 20–8, 25–13, 26–11
Pts: Torrens 14; Rebs: Nicholls 7 Asts: four players 5		Pts: Sy 16; Rebs: Diarra 6 Asts: three players 2

Youth Arena, Rio de Janeiro
Attendance: 3,329
Referees: Scott Beker (AUS), Leandro Lezcano (ARG), Chahinaz Boussetta (MAR)

14 August 2016
17:45

Boxscore

Spain	73–60	Canada
Scoring by quarter: 17–16, 16–13, 16–18, 24–13
Pts: Torrens 20; Rebs: Nicholls 12; Asts: Palau 6		Pts: Fields 13; Rebs: Achonwa, Raincock-Ekunwe 7 Asts: three players 2

Youth Arena, Rio de Janeiro
Attendance: 3,026
Referees: Cristiano Maranho (BRA), Vaughan Mayberry (AUS), Natalia Cuello (DOM)

Quarterfinal

16 August 2016
14:30

Boxscore

Spain	64–62	Turkey
Scoring by quarter: 12–17, 17–8, 13–22, 22–15
Pts: Cruz 14; Rebs: Torrens 11; Asts: Cruz 6		Pts: Sanders 22; Rebs: Sanders 10; Asts: Alben 6

Carioca Arena 1, Rio de Janeiro
Attendance: 6,565
Referees: Cristiano Maranho (BRA), Anne Panther (GER), Leandro Lezcano (ARG)

Semifinal

18 August 2016
15:00

Boxscore

Spain	68–54	Serbia
Scoring by quarter: 20–9, 13–19, 20–10, 15–16
Pts: Ndour, Torrens 14; Rebs: Nicholls 12; Asts: Palau 7		Pts: Čađo, Petrović 12; Rebs: Page, Petrović 7 Asts: Butulija 3

Carioca Arena 1, Rio de Janeiro
Attendance: 8,818
Referees: Damir Javor (SLO), Scott Beker (AUS), Anne Panther (GER)

Final

20 August 2016
15:30

Boxscore

(gold) United States	101–72	Spain (silver)
Scoring by quarter: 21–17, 28–15, 32–17, 20–23
Pts: Whalen, Taurasi 17; Rebs: Charles, Griner 7 Asts: Whalen 6		Pts: Torrens 18; Rebs: Torrens, Ndour 5 Asts: Torrens, Cruz 4

Carioca Arena 1, Rio de Janeiro
Attendance: 9,586
Referees: Eddie Viator (FRA), Piotr Pastusiak (POL), Hwang In-tae (KOR)

== Boxing ==
Spain entered one boxer to compete in the men's light flyweight division into the Olympic boxing tournament. Samuel Carmona had claimed an Olympic spot with his semifinal victory at the 2016 AIBA World Qualifying Tournament in Baku, Azerbaijan. Meanwhile, Youba Sissokho rounded out the Spanish roster with his box-off victory at the 2016 APB and WSB Olympic Qualifier in Vargas, Venezuela.

Athlete	Event	Round of 32	Round of 16	Quarterfinal	Semifinal	Final	
Athlete	Event	Opposition Result	Opposition Result	Opposition Result	Opposition Result	Opposition Result	Rank
Samuel Carmona	Men's light flyweight	Hovhannisyan (ARM); W 3–0	Barnes (IRL); W 2–1	Martínez (COL); L 1–2	Did not advance		
Youba Sissokho	Men's welterweight	Giyasov (UZB); L 0–3	Did not advance				

== Canoeing ==
=== Slalom ===
Spanish canoeists have qualified two boats in each of the following through the 2015 ICF Canoe Slalom World Championships, and the 2016 European Canoe Slalom Championships, respectively.

Athlete	Event	Preliminary						Semifinal		Final	
Athlete	Event	Run 1	Rank	Run 2	Rank	Best	Rank	Time	Rank	Time	Rank
Ander Elosegi	Men's C-1	97.33	4	102.39	11	97.33	8 Q	97.93	2 Q	101.27	8
Maialen Chourraut	Women's K-1	155.43	21	106.47	9	106.47	11 Q	101.83	3 Q	98.65	1st place, gold medalist(s)

=== Sprint ===
Spanish canoeists have qualified two boats in each of the following distances for the Games through the 2015 ICF Canoe Sprint World Championships. Meanwhile, four additional boats (men's C-1 200 m, men's K-1 1000 m, and men's K-1 & K-2 200 m) were awarded to the Spanish squad by virtue of a top two national finish at the 2016 European Qualification Regatta in Duisburg, Germany.

Men

Athlete	Event	Heats		Semifinals		Final	
Athlete	Event	Time	Rank	Time	Rank	Time	Rank
Alfonso Benavides	C-1 200 m	40.610	1 Q	40.038	2 FA	39.649	4
Saúl Craviotto	K-1 200 m	34.694	2 Q	34.545	3 FA	35.662	3rd place, bronze medalist(s)
Marcus Walz	K-1 1000 m	3:33.786	3 Q	3:33.781	3 FA	3:31.447	1st place, gold medalist(s)
Saúl Craviotto; Cristian Toro	K-2 200 m	31.161	1 FA	Bye		32.075	1st place, gold medalist(s)
Óscar Carrera; Rodrigo Germade; Javier Hernanz; Iñigo Peña	K-4 1000 m	2:55.514	3 Q	3:00.237	2 FA	3:06.768	5

Women

Athlete	Event	Heats		Semifinals		Final	
Athlete	Event	Time	Rank	Time	Rank	Time	Rank
María Teresa Portela	K-1 200 m	40.844	3 Q	40.241	2 FA	41.053	6

Qualification Legend: FA = Qualify to final (medal); FB = Qualify to final B (non-medal)

== Cycling ==
=== Road ===
Spanish riders qualified for the following quota places in the men's and women's Olympic road race by virtue of their top 15 final national ranking in the 2015 UCI World Tour (for men) and top 22 in the UCI World Ranking (for women).

Men

Athlete	Event	Time	Rank
Jonathan Castroviejo	Road race	Did not finish	
Jonathan Castroviejo	Time trial	1:13:21.50	4
Imanol Erviti	Road race	Did not finish	
Jon Izaguirre	Road race	Did not finish	
Jon Izaguirre	Time trial	1:14:21.59	8
Joaquim Rodríguez	Road race	6:10:27	5
Alejandro Valverde	Road race	6:19:43	30

Women

Athlete	Event	Time	Rank
Ane Santesteban	Road race	4:02:59	47

=== Track ===
Following the completion of the 2016 UCI Track Cycling World Championships, Spain secured a berth in the women's team sprint with a right to enter two riders in the women's sprint and keirin. Although Spain failed to earn a place in the men's team sprint, they managed to secure a single berth in the men's sprint, by virtue of their final individual UCI Olympic ranking in that event.

Sprint

Athlete	Event	Qualification		Round 1	Repechage 1	Round 2	Repechage 2	Quarterfinals	Semifinals	Final	
Athlete	Event	Time Speed (km/h)	Rank	Opposition Time Speed (km/h)	Opposition Time Speed (km/h)	Opposition Time Speed (km/h)	Opposition Time Speed (km/h)	Opposition Time Speed (km/h)	Opposition Time Speed (km/h)	Opposition Time Speed (km/h)	Rank
Juan Peralta	Men's sprint	10.055; 71.606	19	Did not advance							
Tania Calvo	Women's sprint	11.162; 64.504	19	Did not advance							
Helena Casas	Women's sprint	11.707; 61.501	26	Did not advance							

Team sprint

Athlete	Event	Qualification		Semifinals		Final	
Athlete	Event	Time Speed (km/h)	Rank	Opposition Time Speed (km/h)	Rank	Opposition Time Speed (km/h)	Rank
Tania Calvo; Helena Casas	Women's team sprint	33.891; 53.111	8 Q	China; L 33.531; 53.681	7	Did not advance	

Keirin

Athlete	Event	1st round	Repechage	2nd round	Final
Athlete	Event	Rank	Rank	Rank	Rank
Tania Calvo	Women's keirin	DNF R	4	Did not advance	
Helena Casas	Women's keirin	4 R	3	Did not advance	

=== Mountain biking ===
Spanish mountain bikers qualified for three men's quota places into the Olympic cross-country race, as a result of the nation's third-place finish in the UCI Olympic Ranking List of 25 May 2016.

Athlete	Event	Time	Rank
Carlos Coloma	Men's cross-country	1:34:51	3rd place, bronze medalist(s)
José Antonio Hermida	Men's cross-country	1:38:21	15
David Valero	Men's cross-country	1:37:00	9

== Equestrian ==
Spanish equestrians have qualified a full squad each in the team dressage and jumping competition through the 2015 European Championships. One eventing rider has been added to the squad by virtue of a top nine finish from overall Olympic rankings. Spain is scheduled to mark its Olympic comeback in eventing and jumping for the first time since 2000.

=== Dressage ===
Athlete	Horse	Event	Grand Prix		Grand Prix Special		Grand Prix Freestyle		Overall	
Athlete	Horse	Event	Score	Rank	Score	Rank	Technical	Artistic	Score	Rank
Claudio Castilla	Alcaide	Individual	69.814	38	Did not advance					
Beatriz Ferrer-Salat	Delgado	Individual	74.829	20 Q	76.863	8 Q	76.500	83.000	80.161	10
Severo Jurado	Lorenzo	Individual	76.429	11 Q	77.479	6 Q	81.750	91.000	83.553	5
Daniel Martin Dockx	Grandioso	Individual	70.829	34	Did not advance					
Claudio Castilla; Beatriz Ferrer-Salat; Severo Jurado; Daniel Martin Dockx	See above	Team	74.029	7	Did not advance		—N/a		74.029	7

=== Eventing ===
Athlete	Horse	Event	Dressage		Cross-country			Jumping						Total	
Athlete	Horse	Event	Dressage		Cross-country			Qualifier			Final			Total	
Athlete	Horse	Event	Penalties	Rank	Penalties	Total	Rank	Penalties	Total	Rank	Penalties	Total	Rank	Penalties	Rank
Albert Hermoso	Hito	Individual	64.30	63	Eliminated			Did not advance							

=== Jumping ===
Athlete	Horse	Event	Qualification								Final					Total	
Athlete	Horse	Event	Round 1		Round 2			Round 3			Round A		Round B			Total	
Athlete	Horse	Event	Penalties	Rank	Penalties	Total	Rank	Penalties	Total	Rank	Penalties	Rank	Penalties	Total	Rank	Penalties	Rank
Eduardo Álvarez Áznar	Rockfeller de Pleville	Individual	4 #	=27 Q	Eliminated #			Did not advance									
Sergio Álvarez Moya	Carlo	Individual	0	=1 Q	0	0	=1 Q	6	6	17 Q	0	=1 Q	9	9	=20	9	=20
Pilar Lucrecia Cordón	Gribouille du Lys	Individual	4	=27 Q	8	12	=46	Did not advance									
Manuel Fernández Saro	U Watch	Individual	4	=27 Q	4	8	=30 Q	9	17	=38	Did not advance						
Eduardo Álvarez Áznar; Sergio Álvarez Moya; Pilar Lucrecia Cordón; Manuel Fernández Saro	See above	Team	8	8	12	12	11	Did not advance			—N/a					Did not advance	

"#" indicates that the score of this rider does not count in the team competition, since only the best three results of a team are counted.

== Field hockey ==
Summary

Key:

- FT – After full time.
- P – Match decided by penalty-shootout.

Team	Event	Group stage						Quarterfinal	Semifinal	Final / BM	
Team	Event	Opposition Score	Opposition Score	Opposition Score	Opposition Score	Opposition Score	Rank	Opposition Score	Opposition Score	Opposition Score	Rank
Spain men's	Men's tournament	Brazil; W 7–0	Australia; W 1–0	New Zealand; W 3–2	Belgium; L 1–3	Great Britain; D 1–1	2	Argentina; L 1–2	Did not advance		5
Spain women's	Women's tournament	Netherlands; L 0–5	China; L 0–2	New Zealand; L 1–2	Germany; W 2–1	South Korea; W 3–2	4	Great Britain; L 1–3	Did not advance		8

=== Men's tournament ===
Spain men's field hockey team qualified for the Olympics by having achieved the next highest placement in the 2014–2015 FIH Hockey World League Semifinals among the countries that have not qualified yet for the Games.

Team roster

The following is the Spain roster in the men's field hockey tournament of the 2016 Summer Olympics.

Head coach: Fred Soyez

1. Francisco Cortés (GK)
3. Sergi Enrique
5. Bosco Pérez-Pla
6. Miquel Delás
7. Pau Quemada
8. Viçens Ruiz
9. Álvaro Iglesias
10. David Alegre (C)
11. Roc Oliva
12. Jordi Carrera
13. Andrés Mir
17. Xavi Lleonart
19. Marc Sallés
20. Salva Piera
21. Álex Casasayas
22. Manel Terraza
23. Josep Romeu

Reserves:

- Mario Fernández

Group play

Pos	Team	Pld	W	D	L	GF	GA	GD	Pts	Qualification
1	Belgium	5	4	0	1	21	5	+16	12	Quarter-finals
2	Spain	5	3	1	1	13	6	+7	10	Quarter-finals
3	Australia	5	3	0	2	13	4	+9	9	Quarter-finals
4	New Zealand	5	2	1	2	17	8	+9	7	Quarter-finals
5	Great Britain	5	1	2	2	14	10	+4	5	
6	Brazil (H)	5	0	0	5	1	46	−45	0	

Source: Rio2016
Rules for classification: 1) Points; 2) Matches won; 3) Goal difference; 4) Goals for; 5) Head-to-head result.
(H) Hosts

6 August 2016
19:30

Spain	7–0	Brazil
Lleonart 16', 42'; Oliva 35'; Romeu 35', 52'; Ruiz 45'; Alegre 55'	Report

Umpires:
Marcin Grochal (POL)
Chen Dekang (CHN)

7 August 2016
20:30

Australia	0–1	Spain
	Report	Casasayas 6'

Umpires:
Christian Blasch (GER)
Coen van Bunge (NED)

9 August 2016
10:00

New Zealand	2–3	Spain
Child 3', 30'	Report	Oliva 1'; Casasayas 10'; Lleonart 60'

Umpires:
Christian Blasch (GER)
Germán Montes de Oca (ARG)

11 August 2016
13:30

Spain	1–3	Belgium
Quemada 41'	Report	Charlier 6'; Stockbroekx 16'; Charlier 21'

Umpires:
Christian Blasch (GER)
Germán Montes de Oca (ARG)

12 August 2016
17:00

Great Britain	1–1	Spain
Ward 15'	Report	Alegre 9'

Umpires:
Christian Blasch (GER)
Coen van Bunge (NED)

Quarterfinal

14 August 2016
10:00

Spain	1–2	Argentina
Quemada 57'	Report	Peillat 15'; Gilardi 59'

Umpires:
Martin Madden (GBR)
Adam Kearns (AUS)

=== Women's tournament ===
Spain women's field hockey team qualified for the Olympics by having achieved the next highest placement in the 2014–2015 FIH Hockey World League semifinals among the countries that have not qualified yet for the Games.

Team roster

The following is the Spain roster in the women's field hockey tournament of the 2016 Summer Olympics.

Head coach: Adrian Lock

1. María López (GK)
2. Rocío Gutiérrez
3. Rocío Ybarra (C)
7. Carlota Petchamé
8. Carola Salvatella
9. María López
10. Berta Bonastre
11. Cristina Guinea
17. Lola Riera
20. Xantal Giné
21. Beatriz Pérez
22. Gloria Comerma
23. Georgina Oliva
24. Begoña García
25. Alicia Magaz
29. Lucía Jiménez Vicente

Reserves:

- Júlia Pons
- María Ángeles Ruiz

Group play

Pos	Team	Pld	W	D	L	GF	GA	GD	Pts	Qualification
1	Netherlands	5	4	1	0	13	1	+12	13	Quarter-finals
2	New Zealand	5	3	1	1	11	5	+6	10	Quarter-finals
3	Germany	5	2	1	2	6	6	0	7	Quarter-finals
4	Spain	5	2	0	3	6	12	−6	6	Quarter-finals
5	China	5	1	2	2	3	5	−2	5	
6	South Korea	5	0	1	4	3	13	−10	1	

Source: Rio2016
Rules for classification: 1) Points; 2) Matches won; 3) Goal difference; 4) Goals for; 5) Head-to-head result.

7 August 2016
12:30

Netherlands	5–0	Spain
Welten 12'; Leurink 16'; Keetels 19'; Paumen 23', 49'	Report

Umpires:
Amy Baxter (USA)
Amber Church (NZL)

8 August 2016
19:30

Spain	0–2	China
	Report	Zhao 8'; Peng 25'

Umpires:
Amber Church (NZL)
Michelle Meister (GER)

10 August 2016
10:00

Spain	1–2	New Zealand
Petchame 60'	Report	Smith 22', 51'

Umpires:
Irene Presenqui (ARG)
Elena Eskina (RUS)

11 August 2016
17:00

Germany	1–2	Spain
Schütze 21'	Report	Guinea 9'; Salvatella 11'

Umpires:
Fanneke Alkemade (NED)
Miao Lin (CHN)

13 August 2016
17:00

South Korea	2–3	Spain
Cheon 18'; Kim 55'	Report	Garcia 39'; Riera 41'; Comerma 48'

Umpires:
Michelle Meister (GER)
Fanneke Alkemade (NED)

Quarterfinal

15 August 2016
18:00

Great Britain	3–1	Spain
Twigg 8'; H. Richardson-Walsh 13'; Owsley 27'	Report	Oliva 53'

Umpires:
Kelly Hudson (NZL)
Melissa Trivic (AUS)

== Golf ==
Spain entered four golfers (two per gender) into the Olympic tournament. Rafa Cabrera-Bello (world no. 28), Sergio García (world no. 12), Carlota Ciganda (world no. 36) and Azahara Muñoz (world no. 48) qualified directly among the top 60 eligible players for their respective individual events based on the IGF World Rankings as of 11 July 2016.

Athlete	Event	Round 1	Round 2	Round 3	Round 4	Total		
Athlete	Event	Score	Score	Score	Score	Score	Par	Rank
Rafa Cabrera-Bello	Men's	67	70	71	68	276	−8	=5
Sergio García	Men's	69	72	70	66	277	−7	=8
Carlota Ciganda	Women's	67	72	78	73	290	+6	=39
Azahara Muñoz	Women's	68	69	73	72	282	−2	=21

== Gymnastics ==
=== Artistic ===
Spain entered three artistic gymnasts into the Olympic competition, failing to send both men's and women's all-around teams for the first time since 1980. Rayderley Zapata had claimed his Olympic spot in the men's apparatus and all-around events at the 2015 World Championships, while two more places had been awarded each to the Spanish male and female gymnast, who participated at the Olympic Test Event in Rio de Janeiro.

Men

Athlete	Event	Qualification								Final							
Athlete	Event	Apparatus						Total	Rank	Apparatus						Total	Rank
Athlete	Event	F	PH	R	V	PB	HB	Total	Rank	F	PH	R	V	PB	HB	Total	Rank
Néstor Abad	All-around	14.033	13.400	14.333	14.900	12.966	14.766	84.398	31	Did not advance							
Rayderley Zapata	Floor	15.083	—N/a					15.083	11	Did not advance							

Women

Athlete	Event	Qualification						Final					
Athlete	Event	Apparatus				Total	Rank	Apparatus				Total	Rank
Athlete	Event	V	UB	BB	F	Total	Rank	V	UB	BB	F	Total	Rank
Ana Pérez	All-around	13.933	13.633	13.600	13.133	54.299	36	Did not advance					

=== Rhythmic ===
Spain qualified a squad of rhythmic gymnasts for the individual and group all-around by finishing in the top 15 (for individual) and top 10 (for group) at the 2015 World Championships in Stuttgart, Germany.

Athlete	Event	Qualification						Final					
Athlete	Event	Hoop	Ball	Clubs	Ribbon	Total	Rank	Hoop	Ball	Clubs	Ribbon	Total	Rank
Carolina Rodríguez	Individual	17.566	17.750	17.833	17.366	70.515	7 Q	17.616	17.683	17.700	16.950	69.949	8

Athlete	Event	Qualification				Final			
Athlete	Event	5 balls	3 ribbons 2 hoops	Total	Rank	5 balls	3 ribbons 2 hoops	Total	Rank
Sandra Aguilar; Artemi Gavezou; Elena López; Lourdes Mohedano; Alejandra Quereda	Team	17.783	17.966	35.749	1 Q	17.800	17.966	35.766	2nd place, silver medalist(s)

== Handball ==
Summary

Key:

- ET – After extra time
- P – Match decided by penalty-shootout.

Team	Event	Group stage						Quarterfinal	Semifinal	Final / BM	
Team	Event	Opposition Score	Opposition Score	Opposition Score	Opposition Score	Opposition Score	Rank	Opposition Score	Opposition Score	Opposition Score	Rank
Spain women's	Women's tournament	Montenegro; W 25–19	Norway; L 24–27	Brazil; W 29–24	Romania; L 21–24	Angola; W 26–22	3	France; L 26–27^{ET}	Did not advance		6

=== Women's tournament ===
Spain women's handball team qualified for the Olympics by having achieved the next highest placement at the 2014 European Championships, as the winning team Norway had guaranteed their rights to secure a lone outright berth for the Games through the 2015 World Championships.

Team roster

The following is the Spanish roster in the women's handball tournament of the 2016 Summer Olympics.

Head coach: Jorge Dueñas

No.	Pos.	Name	Date of birth (age)	Height	App.	Goals	Club
2	RW	Marta López	4 February 1990 (aged 26)	1.68 m	80	171	(Spain) Bera Bera
4	RW	Carmen Martín	29 May 1988 (aged 28)	1.72 m	171	564	(Romania) CSM București
6	RB	Nely Carla Alberto	2 July 1983 (aged 33)	1.79 m	118	325	(France) Chambray Touraine Handball
9	RB	Marta Mangué	23 April 1983 (aged 33)	1.70 m	284	1001	(France) Brest Bretagne Handball
10	CB	Macarena Aguilar	12 March 1985 (aged 31)	1.70 m	215	580	Unattached
12	GK	Silvia Navarro	20 March 1979 (aged 36)	1.69 m	142	3	(Spain) Remudas
14	P	Elisabeth Chávez	17 November 1990 (aged 25)	1.92 m	151	97	(France) Fleury Loiret HB
17	LW	Elisabeth Pinedo	13 May 1981 (aged 35)	1.75 m	191	417	(Spain) Bera Bera
25	CB	Nerea Pena	13 December 1989 (aged 26)	1.75 m	98	306	(Hungary) Ferencváros
27	LB	Lara González Ortega	22 February 1992 (aged 24)	1.84 m	51	60	(Denmark) Team Esbjerg
30	P	Patricia Elorza	8 April 1984 (aged 32)	1.80 m	112	71	(Spain) Bera Bera
35	LW	Naiara Egozkue	21 October 1983 (aged 32)	1.73 m	54	79	(Spain) Zuazo Barakaldo
44	P	Ainhoa Hernández	27 April 1994 (aged 22)	1.80 m	26	24	(Spain) Zuazo Barakaldo
48	GK	Darly de Paula	25 August 1982 (aged 33)	1.78 m	20	0	(Montenegro) Budućnost
86	LB	Alexandrina Barbosa	5 May 1986 (aged 30)	1.75 m	65	312	(Russia) Rostov-Don

Group play

Pos	Team	Pld	W	D	L	GF	GA	GD	Pts	Qualification
1	Brazil (H)	5	4	0	1	138	117	+21	8	Quarter-finals
2	Norway	5	4	0	1	141	121	+20	8	Quarter-finals
3	Spain	5	3	0	2	125	116	+9	6	Quarter-finals
4	Angola	5	2	0	3	116	128	−12	4	Quarter-finals
5	Romania	5	2	0	3	108	119	−11	4	
6	Montenegro	5	0	0	5	107	134	−27	0	

Source: IHF
Rules for classification: 1) Points; 2) Head-to-head points; 3) Head-to-head goal difference; 4) Head-to-head goals scored; 5) Goal difference; 6) Goals scored; 7) Draw.
(H) Hosts

6 August 2016; 16:40	Montenegro	19–25	Spain	Future Arena, Rio de Janeiro; Attendance: 8,115; Referees: Bonaventura, Bonaventura (FRA)
6 August 2016; 16:40	K. Bulatović 5	(10–14)	four players 4	Future Arena, Rio de Janeiro; Attendance: 8,115; Referees: Bonaventura, Bonaventura (FRA)
6 August 2016; 16:40	2× (yellow card) 4× (suspension)	Report	3× (yellow card) 1× (suspension)	Future Arena, Rio de Janeiro; Attendance: 8,115; Referees: Bonaventura, Bonaventura (FRA)

8 August 2016; 14:40	Spain	24–27	Norway	Future Arena, Rio de Janeiro; Referees: Geipel, Helbig (GER)
8 August 2016; 14:40	Cabral 5	(10–11)	Kristiansen 7	Future Arena, Rio de Janeiro; Referees: Geipel, Helbig (GER)
8 August 2016; 14:40	2× (yellow card) 3× (suspension)	Report	4× (yellow card) 7× (suspension) 1× (red card)	Future Arena, Rio de Janeiro; Referees: Geipel, Helbig (GER)

10 August 2016; 09:30	Brazil	24–29	Spain	Future Arena, Rio de Janeiro; Referees: Koo, Lee (KOR)
10 August 2016; 09:30	da Silva 7	(12–15)	Pena 8	Future Arena, Rio de Janeiro; Referees: Koo, Lee (KOR)
10 August 2016; 09:30	3× (yellow card) 5× (suspension)	Report	4× (yellow card) 8× (suspension)	Future Arena, Rio de Janeiro; Referees: Koo, Lee (KOR)

12 August 2016; 14:40	Romania	24–21	Spain	Future Arena, Rio de Janeiro; Referees: Bonaventura, Bonaventura (FRA)
12 August 2016; 14:40	Neagu 9	(13–11)	three players 4	Future Arena, Rio de Janeiro; Referees: Bonaventura, Bonaventura (FRA)
12 August 2016; 14:40	2× (yellow card) 2× (suspension)	Report	3× (yellow card) 1× (suspension)	Future Arena, Rio de Janeiro; Referees: Bonaventura, Bonaventura (FRA)

14 August 2016; 19:50	Spain	26–22	Angola	Future Arena, Rio de Janeiro; Referees: Pinto, Menezes (BRA)
14 August 2016; 19:50	Cabral, Martín 7	(13–12)	Guialo 6	Future Arena, Rio de Janeiro; Referees: Pinto, Menezes (BRA)
14 August 2016; 19:50	4× (yellow card) 5× (suspension)	Report	3× (yellow card) 8× (suspension) 1× (red card)	Future Arena, Rio de Janeiro; Referees: Pinto, Menezes (BRA)

Quarterfinal

16 August 2016
13:30
Spain
26–27 (ET)
France
Future Arena, Rio de Janeiro
Referees: Alpaidze, Berezkina (RUS)
Pena 13
(12–5)
Lacrabère 7
4× (yellow card) 8× (suspension) 1× (red card)
Report
2× (yellow card) 2× (suspension)

FT: 23–23 ET: 3–4

== Judo ==
Spain qualified a total of five judokas for the following weight classes at the Games. Francisco Garrigos, Julia Figueroa, María Bernabéu, and London 2012 Olympian Sugoi Uriarte were ranked among the top 22 eligible judokas for men and top 14 for women in the IJF World Ranking List of 30 May 2016, while Laura Gómez at women's half-lightweight (52 kg) earned a continental quota spot from the European region, as the highest-ranked Spanish judoka outside of direct qualifying position.

Athlete	Event	Round of 64	Round of 32	Round of 16	Quarterfinals	Semifinals	Repechage	Final / BM	
Athlete	Event	Opposition Result	Opposition Result	Opposition Result	Opposition Result	Opposition Result	Opposition Result	Opposition Result	Rank
Francisco Garrigós	Men's −60 kg	Bye	Englmaier (GER); L 000–001	Did not advance					
Sugoi Uriarte	Men's −66 kg	Bye	Shikhalizade (AZE); L 000–001	Did not advance					
Julia Figueroa	Women's −48 kg	—N/a	Bye	Mestre (CUB); L 000–011	Did not advance				
Laura Gómez	Women's −52 kg	—N/a	Babamuratova (TKM); W 101–000	Chițu (ROU); L 000–101	Did not advance				
María Bernabéu	Women's −70 kg	—N/a	Bye	Kłys (POL); W 000–000 S	Alvear (COL); L 000–100	Did not advance	Bolder (ISR); W 000–000 S	Koch (GER); L 000–010	5

== Rowing ==
Spain qualified two boats for each of the following rowing classes into the Olympic regatta. One rowing crew had confirmed an Olympic place for their boat in the men's pair at the 2015 FISA World Championships in Lac d'Aiguebelette, France, while the women's pair rowers had added one more boat to the Spanish roster as a result of their top four finish at the 2016 European & Final Qualification Regatta in Lucerne, Switzerland.

Athlete	Event	Heats		Repechage		Semifinals		Final	
Athlete	Event	Time	Rank	Time	Rank	Time	Rank	Time	Rank
Àlex Sigurbjörnsson; Pau Vela	Men's pair	6:54.26	5 R	6:40.47	4	Did not advance			
Anna Boada; Aina Cid	Women's pair	7:12.00	2 SA/B	Bye		7:30.79	3 FA	7:35.22	6

Qualification Legend: FA=Final A (medal); FB=Final B (non-medal); FC=Final C (non-medal); FD=Final D (non-medal); FE=Final E (non-medal); FF=Final F (non-medal); SA/B=Semifinals A/B; SC/D=Semifinals C/D; SE/F=Semifinals E/F; QF=Quarterfinals; R=Repechage

== Rugby sevens ==
=== Men's tournament ===
Spain men's rugby sevens team qualified for the Olympics by winning the final Cup match over Samoa at the Final Olympic Qualification Tournament in Fontvieille, Monaco.

Team roster

The following is Spain's roster in the men's rugby sevens tournament of the 2016 Summer Olympics.

Head coach: José Ignacio Incháusti

No.	Pos.	Player	Date of birth (age*)	Events	Points	Union
1	FW	Ignacio Martín	15 October 1983 (aged 32)	11	129	(Spain) Bera Bera
2	FW	Matías Tudela (c)	6 October 1984 (aged 31)	16	45	(Spain) Tatami
3	FW	Iñaki Villanueva	10 February 1991 (aged 25)	2	5	(Spain) Complutense Cisneros
4	BK	Pablo Feijoo	18 May 1982 (aged 34)	12	69	(Spain) Complutense Cisneros
5	BK	Ángel López	16 January 1992 (aged 24)	13	39	(Spain) Complutense Cisneros
6	FW	Francisco Hernández	28 October 1988 (aged 27)	9	82	(Spain) Complutense Cisneros
7	BK	Marcos Poggi	8 March 1985 (aged 31)	8	40	(Spain) Complutense Cisneros
8	BK	César Sempere	26 April 1984 (aged 32)	4	112	(Spain) Tatami
9	BK	Igor Genua	5 June 1988 (aged 28)	5	34	(Spain) Hernani
10	BK	Joan Losada	20 June 1992 (aged 24)	1	5	(Spain) FC Barcelona
11	BK	Pol Pla	18 February 1993 (aged 23)	0	0	(Spain) FC Barcelona
12	BK	Javier Carrión	9 November 1990 (aged 25)	16	67	(Spain) La Vila
*Ages given as in 2016.

Group play

Pos	Team	Pld	W	D	L	PF	PA	PD	Pts	Qualification
1	South Africa	3	2	0	1	55	12	+43	7	Quarter-finals
2	France	3	2	0	1	57	45	+12	7	Quarter-finals
3	Australia	3	2	0	1	52	48	+4	7	Quarter-finals
4	Spain	3	0	0	3	17	76	−59	3	

Source: World Rugby
Rules for classification: 1) Points; 2) Head-to-head result; 3) Point difference; 4) Points scored.

9 August 2016
11:30

South Africa	24–0	Spain
Try: Afrika (2) 1' c, 7' c Senatla 8' m Snyman 12' m Con: Afrika (2/4)	Report (Rio 2016); Report (World Rugby)

Deodoro Stadium, Rio de Janeiro
Referee: Nick Briant (New Zealand)

9 August 2016
16:00

Australia	26–12	Spain
Try: Clark 1' c Parahi 7' c Porch 8' m Foley 14' c Con: Stannard (3/4)	Report (Rio 2016); Report (World Rugby)	Try: Poggi (2) 2' m, 4' c Con: Hernández (1/2)

Deodoro Stadium, Rio de Janeiro
Referee: Rasta Rasivhenge (South Africa)

10 August 2016
11:00

France	26–5	Spain
Try: Vakatawa (2) 4' c, 8' m Cler 10' c Aicardi 12' c Con: Bouhraoua (3/4)	Report (Rio 2016); Report (World Rugby)	Try: Sempere 14' m Con: Genua (0/1)

Deodoro Stadium, Rio de Janeiro
Referee: Anthony Moyes (Australia)

Classification semifinal (9–12)

10 August 2016
16:30

Spain	14–12	Kenya
Try: Poggi (2) 7' c, 8' c Con: Hernández (2/2)	Report (Rio 2016); Report (World Rugby)	Try: Amonde 4' m Odhiambo 12' c Con: Adema (0/1); Oliech (1/1) 12'

Deodoro Stadium, Rio de Janeiro
Referee: Taku Otsuki (Japan)

Ninth place match

11 August 2016
13:00

United States	24–12	Spain
Try: Barrett 4' c Isles (2) 7' m, 14' m Unufe 12' c Con: Hughes (1/2); Wyles (1/2)	Report (Rio 2016); Report (World Rugby)	Try: Fontes 2' m López 10' c Con: Genua (0/1); Hernández (1/1)

Deodoro Stadium, Rio de Janeiro
Referee: Rasta Rasivhenge (South Africa)

=== Women's tournament ===
Spain women's rugby sevens team qualified for the Olympics by winning the final Cup match over Russia at the Final Olympic Qualification Tournament in Dublin, Ireland.

Team roster

The following is the Spain roster in the women's rugby sevens tournament of the 2016 Summer Olympics.

Head coach: José Antonio Barrio

Backs		Forwards
4	Patricia García	1	Berta García
7	Bárbara Pla	2	Paula Medín
9	María Casado	3	Ángela del Pan
10	Vanesa Rial	5	Marina Bravo
11	Iera Echebarria	6	Elisabet Martínez (c)
		8	Amaia Erbina
		12	María Ribera

Group play

Pos	Team	Pld	W	D	L	PF	PA	PD	Pts	Qualification
1	New Zealand	3	3	0	0	109	12	+97	9	Quarter-finals
2	France	3	2	0	1	71	40	+31	7	Quarter-finals
3	Spain	3	1	0	2	31	65	−34	5	Quarter-finals
4	Kenya	3	0	0	3	17	111	−94	3	

Source: World Rugby
Rules for classification: 1) Points; 2) Head-to-head result; 3) Point difference; 4) Points scored.

6 August 2016
11:00

France	24–7	Spain
Try: Grassineau 3' c Guérin 7' m Ladagnous 9' c Guiglion 13' m Con: Biscarat (2/4)	Report (Rio 2016); Report (World Rugby)	Try: P. García 11' c Con: P. García (1/1)

Deodoro Stadium, Rio de Janeiro
Referee: Amy Perrett (Australia)

6 August 2016
16:30

New Zealand	31–5	Spain
Try: Woodman 2' m McAlister (2) 3' c, 12' m Nathan-Wong 8' c Fitzpatrick 14' c Con: Nathan-Wong (3/5)	Report (Rio 2016); Report (World Rugby)	Try: Casado 11' m Con: P. García (0/1)

Deodoro Stadium, Rio de Janeiro
Referee: Gabriel Lee (Hong Kong)

7 August 2016
11:00

Spain	19–10	Kenya
Try: Plà 1' m Bravo (2) 9' c, 12' c Con: P. García (2/3)	Report (Rio 2016); Report (World Rugby)	Try: Nziwa 6' m Okelo 14' m Con: Awino (0/2)

Deodoro Stadium, Rio de Janeiro
Referee: James Bolabiu (Fiji)

Quarterfinals

7 August 2016
17:00

Australia	24–0	Spain
Try: Tonegato 3' m Caslick (2) 5' c, 9' c Green 14' m Con: Dalton (2/3); Etheridge (0/1)	Report (Rio 2016); Report (World Rugby)

Deodoro Stadium, Rio de Janeiro
Referee: Jess Beard (New Zealand)

Classification semifinal (5–8)

8 August 2016
13:30

Spain	12–24	France
Try: Erbina 12' c Etxebarría 14' m Con: P. García (1/2)	Report (Rio 2016); Report (World Rugby)	Try: Mayans 1' m Guérin (3) 3' c, 7' m, 9' c Con: Le Pesq (1/3); Biscarat (1/1)

Deodoro Stadium, Rio de Janeiro
Referee: James Bolabiu (Fiji)

Seventh place match

8 August 2016
17:30

Spain	21–0	Fiji
Try: P. García 3' c Erbina 5' c Etxebarría 7' c Con: P. García (3/3)	Report (Rio 2016); Report (World Rugby)

Deodoro Stadium, Rio de Janeiro
Referee: Beatrice Benvenuti (Italy)

== Sailing ==
Spanish sailors have qualified one boat in each of the following classes through the 2014 ISAF Sailing World Championships, the individual fleet Worlds, and European qualifying regattas.

In December 2015, the Royal Spanish Sailing Federation had announced the first four sailors to compete at the Rio regatta: four-time Olympian Iván Pastor, 2012 Olympic champions Marina Alabau in women's RS:X and Támara Echegoyen in the inaugural 49erFX, along with her partner and former 470 crew Berta Betanzos. Laser sailor Joaquín Blanco, along with the 470 and Nacra 17 crews, had claimed their Olympic spots at the ISAF World Cup meet in Hyères, France, while skiff duo Diego Botín and Iago López rounded out the Spanish roster at the Delta Lloyd Regatta on 27 May 2016, following a selection controversy.

Laser Radial sailor and London 2012 Olympian Alicia Cebrián was the last Spaniard to join the sailing crew for the Games at the Kiel Week Regatta in Germany on 24 June 2016.

Men

Athlete	Event	Race													Net points	Final rank
Athlete	Event	1	2	3	4	5	6	7	8	9	10	11	12	M*	Net points	Final rank
Iván Pastor	RS:X	17	19	10	7	7	~~37~~	11	22	16	9	2	3	2	127	9
Joaquín Blanco	Laser	28	~~47~~	24	41	26	29	26	47	30	35	—N/a		EL	286	36
Joan Herp; Jordi Xammar	470	4	16	14	10	9	~~22~~	7	16	12	9	—N/a		EL	97	12
Diego Botín; Iago López	49er	16	5	3	13	6	10	13	15	~~18~~	12	2	13	6	120	9

Women

Athlete	Event	Race													Net points	Final rank
Athlete	Event	1	2	3	4	5	6	7	8	9	10	11	12	M*	Net points	Final rank
Marina Alabau	RS:X	8	7	2	7	6	8	7	2	1	~~27~~	9	3	5	71	5
Alicia Cebrián	Laser Radial	27	9	24	12	13	8	~~28~~	4	21	12	—N/a		EL	130	17
Bàrbara Cornudella; Sara López	470	14	13	7	11	13	11	13	~~19~~	11	10	—N/a		EL	103	12
Berta Betanzos; Támara Echegoyen	49erFX	4	~~13~~	3	1	11	5	4	1	1	5	10	1	7	60	4

Mixed

Athlete	Event	Race													Net points	Final rank
Athlete	Event	1	2	3	4	5	6	7	8	9	10	11	12	M*	Net points	Final rank
Fernando Echavarri; Tara Pacheco	Nacra 17	16	~~21~~	5	16	15	10	11	5	3	4	10	6	EL	101	11

M = Medal race; EL = Eliminated – did not advance into the medal race

== Shooting ==
Spanish shooters have achieved quota places for the following events by virtue of their best finishes at the 2014 and 2015 ISSF World Championships, the 2015 ISSF World Cup series, and European Championships or Games, as long as they obtained a minimum qualifying score (MQS) by 31 March 2016. The shooting team was named at the conclusion of the European Airgun Championships on 1 March 2016, including London 2012 fifth-place finalist Fátima Gálvez and two-time Olympians Alberto Fernández and Sonia Franquet.

Athlete	Event	Qualification		Semifinal		Final	
Athlete	Event	Points	Rank	Points	Rank	Points	Rank
Pablo Carrera	Men's 10 m air pistol	579	10	—N/a		Did not advance	
Pablo Carrera	Men's 50 m pistol	555	9	—N/a		Did not advance	
Jorge Díaz	Men's 10 m air rifle	620.9	27	—N/a		Did not advance	
Alberto Fernández	Men's trap	115	17	Did not advance			
Jorge Llames	Men's 25 m rapid fire pistol	577	14	—N/a		Did not advance	
Sonia Franquet	Women's 10 m air pistol	384	8 Q	—N/a		116.5	6
Sonia Franquet	Women's 25 m pistol	564	35	Did not advance			
Fátima Gálvez	Women's trap	69	3 Q	12	4 q	13 (+0)	4

Qualification Legend: Q = Qualify for the next round; q = Qualify for the bronze medal (shotgun)

== Swimming ==
Spanish swimmers have so far achieved qualifying standards in the following events (up to a maximum of 2 swimmers in each event at the Olympic Qualifying Time (OQT), and potentially 1 at the Olympic Selection Time (OST)): To assure their selection to the Olympic team, swimmers must attain a top-two finish in the final (or in heat-declared winner races on time for long-distance freestyle) inside the federation's target standards at the Spanish Open in Sabadell (19 to 22 March) and the 2016 European Championships in London (16 to 22 May).

A total of 12 Spanish swimmers, highlighted by 2012 double Olympic silver medalist Mireia Belmonte, were formally announced at the Spanish Open on 31 March 2016, while the others were added to the team on 16 June, which extended the swimming roster size to almost a double.

Men

Athlete	Event	Heat		Semifinal		Final	
Athlete	Event	Time	Rank	Time	Rank	Time	Rank
Antonio Arroyo	1500 m freestyle	15:12.61	26	—N/a		Did not advance	
Miguel Durán	400 m freestyle	3:53.40	37	—N/a		Did not advance	
Hugo González	100 m backstroke	54.18	20	Did not advance			
Hugo González	200 m backstroke	1:57.50	14 Q	1:59.08	16	Did not advance	
Carlos Peralta	200 m butterfly	1:56.98	21	Did not advance			
Joan Lluís Pons	400 m individual medley	4:13.55 NR	8 Q	—N/a		4:16.58	8
Marc Sánchez	1500 m freestyle	15:11.38	24	—N/a		Did not advance	
Eduardo Solaeche	200 m individual medley	1:59.67	=12 Q	2:00.47	15	Did not advance	
Markel Alberdi; Aitor Martínez; Bruno Ortiz-Cañavate; Miguel Ortiz-Cañavate	4 × 100 m freestyle relay	3:16.71 NR	14	—N/a		Did not advance	
Miguel Durán; Víctor Martín; Albert Puig; Marc Sánchez	4 × 200 m freestyle relay	7:12.62	12	—N/a		Did not advance	

Women

Athlete	Event	Heat		Semifinal		Final	
Athlete	Event	Time	Rank	Time	Rank	Time	Rank
Mireia Belmonte	400 m freestyle	4:08.12	15	—N/a		Did not advance	
Mireia Belmonte	800 m freestyle	8:25.55	8 Q	—N/a		8:18.55 NR	4
Mireia Belmonte	200 m butterfly	2:06.64	1 Q	2:06.06	2 Q	2:04.85	1st place, gold medalist(s)
Mireia Belmonte	200 m individual medley	2:12.58	15 Q	2:13.33	16	Did not advance	
Mireia Belmonte	400 m individual medley	4:32.75	2 Q	—N/a		4:32.39	3rd place, bronze medalist(s)
Patricia Castro	200 m freestyle	2:00.71	35	Did not advance			
Melani Costa	200 m freestyle	1:58.19	19	Did not advance			
Melani Costa	400 m freestyle	4:08.96	17	—N/a		Did not advance	
Duane da Rocha	100 m backstroke	1:00.87	15 Q	1:00.85	15	Did not advance	
Duane da Rocha	200 m backstroke	2:11.17	19	Did not advance			
Judit Ignacio	100 m butterfly	59.61	30	Did not advance			
Judit Ignacio	200 m butterfly	2:09.82	20	Did not advance			
Jessica Vall	100 m breaststroke	1:07.07	14 Q	1:07.55	16	Did not advance	
Jessica Vall	200 m breaststroke	2:24.55	11 Q	2:24.22	10	Did not advance	
María Vilas	800 m freestyle	8:36.43	19	—N/a		Did not advance	
María Vilas	400 m individual medley	4:42.52	19	—N/a		Did not advance	
Erika Villaécija	10 km open water	—N/a				1:59:04.8	17
África Zamorano	200 m backstroke	2:13.74	25	Did not advance			
África Zamorano	200 m individual medley	2:14.87	24	Did not advance			
Patricia Castro; Melani Costa; Fátima Gallardo; Marta González	4 × 100 m freestyle relay	3:40.46 NR	13	—N/a		Did not advance	
Patricia Castro; Melani Costa; Fátima Gallardo; África Zamorano	4 × 200 m freestyle relay	8:03.74	16	—N/a		Did not advance	

== Synchronized swimming ==
Spain fielded a squad of two synchronized swimmers to compete only in the women's duet by virtue of their first-place finish at the FINA Olympic test event in Rio de Janeiro.

Athlete	Event	Technical routine		Free routine (preliminary)				Free routine (final)		
Athlete	Event	Points	Rank	Points	Rank	Total (technical + free)	Rank	Points	Total (technical + free)	Rank
Ona Carbonell; Gemma Mengual	Duet	92.5024	5	93.7667	4	186.2691	5 Q	94.1333	186.6357	5

== Table tennis ==
Spain entered three athletes into the table tennis competition at the Games. Remarkably going to her third Olympics, Shen Yanfei was automatically selected among the top 22 eligible players in the women's singles based on the ITTF Olympic Rankings. Meanwhile, He Zhiwen granted an invitation from ITTF to compete in the men's singles as one of the next seven highest-ranked eligible players, not yet qualified, on the Olympic Ranking List.

With France's Carole Grundisch pulling out from the Games because of her shoulder injury, two-time Olympian Galia Dvorak took over the vacant spot to join Shen in the women's singles.

Athlete	Event	Preliminary	Round 1	Round 2	Round 3	Round of 16	Quarterfinals	Semifinals	Final / BM	
Athlete	Event	Opposition Result	Opposition Result	Opposition Result	Opposition Result	Opposition Result	Opposition Result	Opposition Result	Opposition Result	Rank
He Zhiwen	Men's singles	Bye	Feng Yj (USA); W 4–2	Chen C-a (TPE); L 2–4	Did not advance					
Galia Dvorak	Women's singles	Bye	Lin G (BRA); L 2–4	Did not advance						
Shen Yanfei	Women's singles	Bye		Ni Xl (LUX); L 3–4	Did not advance					

== Taekwondo ==
Spain entered three athletes into the taekwondo competition at the Olympics. 2012 Olympic flyweight champion Joel González and two-time Worlds medalist Eva Calvo qualified automatically for their respective weight classes by finishing in the top 6 WTF Olympic rankings. 2015 European Games silver medalist Jesús Tortosa secured a third spot on the Spanish team by virtue of his top two finish in the men's flyweight category (58 kg) at the 2016 European Qualification Tournament in Istanbul.

Athlete	Event	Round of 16	Quarterfinals	Semifinals	Repechage	Final / BM	
Athlete	Event	Opposition Result	Opposition Result	Opposition Result	Opposition Result	Opposition Result	Rank
Jesús Tortosa	Men's −58 kg	Zhao S (CHN); L 3–7	Did not advance		Hajjami (MAR); W 4–1	Pie (DOM); L 5–6 SUD	5
Joel González	Men's −68 kg	Grgić (CRO); W 4–3	Pürevjav (MGL); W 7–4	Abu-Ghaush (JOR); L 7–12	Bye	Contreras (VEN); W 4–3	3rd place, bronze medalist(s)
Eva Calvo	Women's −57 kg	Harnsujin (THA); W 6–5	Alizadeh (IRI); W 8–7	Malak (EGY); W 1–0 SUD	Bye	Jones (GBR); L 7–16	2nd place, silver medalist(s)

== Tennis ==
Spain entered nine tennis players (five men and four women) into the Olympic tournament. Beijing 2008 champion Rafael Nadal (world no. 4), along with his colleagues David Ferrer (world no. 14), Roberto Bautista Agut (world no. 16), and Albert Ramos (world no. 32), qualified directly for the men's singles as four of the top 56 eligible players in the ATP World Rankings, while two-time Olympian Carla Suárez Navarro and French Open champion Garbiñe Muguruza did so for the women's singles based on their WTA World Rankings as of 6 June 2016.

Having been directly entered to the singles, Nadal also opted to play with London 2012 Olympian Marc López in the men's doubles. Meanwhile, Anabel Medina Garrigues and Arantxa Parra Santonja paired up together for the second straight time in the women's doubles. On 12 August, Rafael Nadal along with Marc López won the gold medal in men's doubles event for Spain beating Romania's Florin Mergea and Horia Tecău.

Men

Athlete	Event	Round of 64	Round of 32	Round of 16	Quarterfinals	Semifinals	Final / BM	
Athlete	Event	Opposition Result	Opposition Result	Opposition Result	Opposition Result	Opposition Result	Opposition Result	Rank
Roberto Bautista Agut	Singles	Kuznetsov (RUS); W 6–7^{(4–7)}, 6–2, ret	Lorenzi (ITA); W 7–6^{(7–2)}, 6–2	Müller (LUX); W 6–4, 7–6^{(7–4)}	del Potro (ARG); L 5–7, 6–7^{(4–7)}	Did not advance		
David Ferrer	Singles	Istomin (UZB); W 6–2, 6–1	Donskoy (RUS); L 6–3, 6–7^{(1–7)}, 5–7	Did not advance				
Rafael Nadal	Singles	Delbonis (ARG); W 6–2, 6–1	Seppi (ITA); W 6–3, 6–3	Simon (FRA); W 7–6^{(7–5)}, 6–3	Bellucci (BRA); W 2–6, 6–4, 6–2	del Potro (ARG); L 7–5, 4–6, 6–7^{(5–7)}	Nishikori (JPN); L 2–6, 7–6^{(7–1)}, 3–6	4
Albert Ramos	Singles	Nishikori (JPN); L 2–6, 4–6	Did not advance					
Roberto Bautista Agut; David Ferrer	Doubles	—N/a	Rosol / Štěpánek (CZE); W 6–1, 6–4	Kubot / Matkowski (POL); W 6–3, 7–6^{(7–5)}	Johnson / Sock (USA); L 4–6, 2–6	Did not advance		
Marc López; Rafael Nadal	Doubles	—N/a	Haase / Rojer (NED); W 6–4, 6–4	del Potro / González (ARG); W 6–3, 5–7, 6–2	Marach / Peya (AUT); W 6–3, 6–1	Nestor / Pospisil (CAN); W 7–6^{(7–1)}, 7–6^{(7–4)}	Mergea / Tecău (ROU); W 6–2, 3–6, 6–4	1st place, gold medalist(s)

Women

Athlete	Event	Round of 64	Round of 32	Round of 16	Quarterfinals	Semifinals	Final / BM	
Athlete	Event	Opposition Result	Opposition Result	Opposition Result	Opposition Result	Opposition Result	Opposition Result	Rank
Garbiñe Muguruza	Singles	Mitu (ROU); W 6–2, 6–2	Hibino (JPN); W 6–1, 6–1	Puig (PUR); L 1–6, 1–6	Did not advance			
Carla Suárez Navarro	Singles	Ivanovic (SRB); W 2–6, 6–1, 6–2	Konjuh (CRO); W 7–6^{(7–5)}, 6–3	Keys (USA); L 3–6, 6–3, 3–6	Did not advance			
Anabel Medina Garrigues; Arantxa Parra Santonja	Doubles	—N/a	Mattek-Sands / Vandeweghe (USA); L 1–6, 1–6	Did not advance				
Garbiñe Muguruza; Carla Suárez Navarro	Doubles	—N/a	Gonçalves / Pereira (BRA); W 7–6^{(8–6)}, 6–2	Flipkens / Wickmayer (BEL); W 7–5, 2–6, 6–2	Makarova / Vesnina (RUS); L 3–6, 4–6	Did not advance		

Mixed

Athlete	Event	Round of 16	Quarterfinals	Semifinals	Final / BM	
Athlete	Event	Opposition Score	Opposition Score	Opposition Score	Opposition Score	Rank
Garbiñe Muguruza; Rafael Nadal	Doubles	Hradecká / Štěpánek (CZE); L WO	Did not advance			
Carla Suárez Navarro; David Ferrer	Doubles	Watson / Murray (GBR); L 3–6, 4–6	Did not advance			

== Triathlon ==
Spain qualified a total of six triathletes for the Olympics. London 2012 silver medalist Javier Gómez Noya secured the men's triathlon spot for the Spaniards with a gold medal triumph at the ITU World Qualification Event in Rio de Janeiro. Meanwhile, Fernando Alarza, Mario Mola, Miriam Casillas, Ainhoa Murúa, and Carolina Routier were ranked among the top 40 eligible triathletes each in the men's and women's event, respectively, based on the ITU Olympic Qualification List as of 15 May 2016.

On 14 July 2016, Gómez pulled out of the Games due to his elbow injury in a cycling accident. As the next highest-ranked Spanish triathlete, not yet qualified, on the list, Vicente Hernández took over his place.

Athlete	Event	Swim (1.5 km)	Trans 1	Bike (40 km)	Trans 2	Run (10 km)	Total Time	Rank
Fernando Alarza	Men's	18:05	0:51	56:23	0:38	32:11	1:48:08	18
Vicente Hernández	Men's	18:10	0:50	55:41	0:35	33:34	1:48:50	27
Mario Mola	Men's	17:37	0:46	56:18	0:33	31:12	1:46:26	8
Miriam Casillas	Women's	20:04	0.51	1:06:03	0:43	37:51	2:05:32	43
Ainhoa Murúa	Women's	19:19	0.56	1:04:29	1:30	Did not finish		
Carolina Routier	Women's	19:01	0.56	Lapped				

== Volleyball ==
=== Beach ===
Spain men's and women's beach volleyball teams qualified directly for the Olympics by virtue of their nation's top 15 placement in the FIVB Olympic Rankings as of 13 June 2016. These places were awarded to three-time Olympian Pablo Herrera, along with returnees Adrián Gavira and female duo Elsa Baquerizo and Liliana Fernández from London 2012.

Athlete	Event	Preliminary round	Standing	Round of 16	Quarterfinals	Semifinals	Final / BM	
Athlete	Event	Opposition Score	Standing	Opposition Score	Opposition Score	Opposition Score	Opposition Score	Rank
Adrián Gavira; Pablo Herrera	Men's	Pool F Huber – Seidl (AUT); W 2 – 1 (14–21, 21–17, 15–13); Jefferson – Cherif (QAT); L 1 – 2 (21–13, 18–21, 12–15); Gibb – Patterson (USA); W 2 – 1 (21–19, 16–21, 15–7)	1 Q	Alison – Bruno Schmidt (BRA); L 0 – 2 (22–24, 13–21)	Did not advance			
Elsa Baquerizo; Liliana Fernández	Women's	Pool B Gallay – Klug (ARG); W 2 – 0 (21–11, 21–19); Hermannová – Sluková (CZE); W 2 – 0 (21–15, 21–19); Bednarczuk – Seixas (BRA); W 2 – 0 (21–17, 22–20)	1 Q	Birlova – Ukolova (RUS); L 0 – 2 (21–23, 22–24)	Did not advance			

== Water polo ==
Summary

Key:

- FT – After full time.
- P – Match decided by penalty-shootout.

Team	Event	Group stage						Quarterfinal	Semifinal	Final / BM	
Team	Event	Opposition Score	Opposition Score	Opposition Score	Opposition Score	Opposition Score	Rank	Opposition Score	Opposition Score	Opposition Score	Rank
Spain men's	Men's tournament	Italy; L 8–9	United States; W 10–9	Croatia; W 9–4	France; W 10–4	Montenegro; D 9–9	1	Serbia; L 7–10	Greece; L 7–9	Brazil; W 9–8	7
Spain women's	Women's tournament	United States; L 4–11	Hungary; W 11–10	China; W 12–4	—N/a		2	Russia; L 12–8	China; W 11–6	Australia; W 12–10	5

=== Men's tournament ===
Spain men's water polo team qualified for the Olympics by virtue of a top four finish at the Olympic Qualification Tournament in Trieste.

Team roster

The following is the Spanish roster in the men's water polo tournament of the 2016 Summer Olympics.

Head coach: Gabriel Hernández

№	Name	Pos.	Height	Weight	Date of birth	2016 club
1	Iñaki Aguilar	GK	1.89 m (6 ft 2 in)	82 kg (181 lb)	9 September 1983	(Spain) Terrassa
2	Alberto Munarriz	CF	1.97 m (6 ft 6 in)	105 kg (231 lb)	19 May 1994	(Spain) Barceloneta
3	Marc Roca	CF	1.88 m (6 ft 2 in)	94 kg (207 lb)	21 January 1988	(Spain) Barceloneta
4	Ricard Alarcón	D	1.86 m (6 ft 1 in)	90 kg (198 lb)	18 August 1991	(Spain) Terrassa
5	Guillermo Molina (c)	D	1.94 m (6 ft 4 in)	105 kg (231 lb)	16 March 1984	(Italy) AN Brescia
6	Marc Minguell	D	1.86 m (6 ft 1 in)	93 kg (205 lb)	14 January 1985	(Spain) Barceloneta
7	Balázs Szirányi	CF	1.96 m (6 ft 5 in)	108 kg (238 lb)	10 January 1983	(Spain) Barceloneta
8	Albert Español	CF	1.89 m (6 ft 2 in)	86 kg (190 lb)	29 October 1985	(Spain) Barceloneta
9	Roger Tahull	CF	1.95 m (6 ft 5 in)	104 kg (229 lb)	11 May 1997	(Spain) Barceloneta
10	Francisco Fernández	CB	1.85 m (6 ft 1 in)	84 kg (185 lb)	21 June 1986	(Spain) Barceloneta
11	Blai Mallarach	CB	1.87 m (6 ft 2 in)	87 kg (192 lb)	21 August 1987	(Greece) Olympiacos
12	Gonzalo Echenique	CB	1.94 m (6 ft 4 in)	96 kg (212 lb)	27 April 1990	(Croatia) Primorje Rijeka
13	Daniel López	GK	1.91 m (6 ft 3 in)	91 kg (201 lb)	16 July 1980	(Spain) Barceloneta

Group play

Pos	Team	Pld	W	D	L	GF	GA	GD	Pts	Qualification
1	Spain	5	3	1	1	46	35	+11	7	Quarter-finals
2	Croatia	5	3	0	2	37	37	0	6	Quarter-finals
3	Italy	5	3	0	2	40	41	−1	6	Quarter-finals
4	Montenegro	5	2	1	2	36	32	+4	5	Quarter-finals
5	United States	5	2	0	3	35	35	0	4	
6	France	5	1	0	4	28	42	−14	2	

Source: Rio2016
Rules for classification: 1) Points; 2) Head-to-head points; 3) Head-to-head goal difference; 4) Head-to-head goals scored; 5) Goal difference.

6 August 2016; 11:40	Report	Spain	8–9	Italy	Maria Lenk Aquatic Center, Rio de Janeiro; Referees: Vojin Putniković (SRB), Georgios Stavridis (GRE)
6 August 2016; 11:40	Report	Score by quarters: 3–2, 2–1, 1–2, 2–4			Maria Lenk Aquatic Center, Rio de Janeiro; Referees: Vojin Putniković (SRB), Georgios Stavridis (GRE)
6 August 2016; 11:40	Report	Molina 4	Goals	Figlioli, Presciutti 3	Maria Lenk Aquatic Center, Rio de Janeiro; Referees: Vojin Putniković (SRB), Georgios Stavridis (GRE)

8 August 2016; 11:40	Report	United States	9–10	Spain	Maria Lenk Aquatic Center, Rio de Janeiro; Referees: Adrian Alexandrescu (ROU), Péter Molnár (HUN)
8 August 2016; 11:40	Report	Score by quarters: 2–4, 3–1, 2–3, 2–2			Maria Lenk Aquatic Center, Rio de Janeiro; Referees: Adrian Alexandrescu (ROU), Péter Molnár (HUN)
8 August 2016; 11:40	Report	Bonanni 4	Goals	Echenique 3	Maria Lenk Aquatic Center, Rio de Janeiro; Referees: Adrian Alexandrescu (ROU), Péter Molnár (HUN)

10 August 2016; 20:50	Report	Spain	9–4	Croatia	Maria Lenk Aquatic Center, Rio de Janeiro; Referees: Boris Margeta (SLO), Radosław Koryzna (POL)
10 August 2016; 20:50	Report	Score by quarters: 2–0, 2–1, 1–2, 4–1			Maria Lenk Aquatic Center, Rio de Janeiro; Referees: Boris Margeta (SLO), Radosław Koryzna (POL)
10 August 2016; 20:50	Report	Echenique 4	Goals	four players 1	Maria Lenk Aquatic Center, Rio de Janeiro; Referees: Boris Margeta (SLO), Radosław Koryzna (POL)

12 August 2016; 20:50	Report	Spain	10–4	France	Maria Lenk Aquatic Center, Rio de Janeiro; Referees: Fabio Toffoli (BRA), Péter Molnár (HUN)
12 August 2016; 20:50	Report	Score by quarters: 3–1, 3–0, 1–1, 3-2			Maria Lenk Aquatic Center, Rio de Janeiro; Referees: Fabio Toffoli (BRA), Péter Molnár (HUN)
12 August 2016; 20:50	Report	Echenique 3	Goals	Crousillat 2	Maria Lenk Aquatic Center, Rio de Janeiro; Referees: Fabio Toffoli (BRA), Péter Molnár (HUN)

14 August 2016; 12:50	Report	Montenegro	9–9	Spain	Olympic Aquatics Stadium, Rio de Janeiro; Referees: Sergey Naumov (RUS), Radosław Koryzna (POL)
14 August 2016; 12:50	Report	Score by quarters: 2–2, 3–2, 2–4, 2–1			Olympic Aquatics Stadium, Rio de Janeiro; Referees: Sergey Naumov (RUS), Radosław Koryzna (POL)
14 August 2016; 12:50	Report	three players 2	Goals	Molina 2	Olympic Aquatics Stadium, Rio de Janeiro; Referees: Sergey Naumov (RUS), Radosław Koryzna (POL)

Quarterfinal

16 August 2016; 12:20	Report	Serbia	10–7	Spain	Olympic Aquatics Stadium, Rio de Janeiro; Referees: Radosław Koryzna (POL), Daniel Flahive (AUS)
16 August 2016; 12:20	Report	Score by quarters: 3–1, 4–2, 0–2, 3–2			Olympic Aquatics Stadium, Rio de Janeiro; Referees: Radosław Koryzna (POL), Daniel Flahive (AUS)
16 August 2016; 12:20	Report	Mandić 4	Goals	Molina 3	Olympic Aquatics Stadium, Rio de Janeiro; Referees: Radosław Koryzna (POL), Daniel Flahive (AUS)

Classification semifinal (5–8)

18 August 2016; 15:10	Report	Greece	9–7	Spain	Olympic Aquatics Stadium, Rio de Janeiro; Referees: Boris Margeta (SLO), Nenad Peris (CRO)
18 August 2016; 15:10	Report	Score by quarters: 1–0, 2–1, 4–3, 2–3			Olympic Aquatics Stadium, Rio de Janeiro; Referees: Boris Margeta (SLO), Nenad Peris (CRO)
18 August 2016; 15:10	Report	Afroudakis, Mourikis 2	Goals	Molina 4	Olympic Aquatics Stadium, Rio de Janeiro; Referees: Boris Margeta (SLO), Nenad Peris (CRO)

Seventh place match

20 August 2016; 11:40	Report	Brazil	8–9	Spain	Olympic Aquatics Stadium, Rio de Janeiro; Referees: Vojin Putniković (SRB), Stanko Ivanovski (MNE)
20 August 2016; 11:40	Report	Score by quarters: 1–3, 2–1, 1–2, 4–3			Olympic Aquatics Stadium, Rio de Janeiro; Referees: Vojin Putniković (SRB), Stanko Ivanovski (MNE)
20 August 2016; 11:40	Report	three players 2	Goals	three players 2	Olympic Aquatics Stadium, Rio de Janeiro; Referees: Vojin Putniković (SRB), Stanko Ivanovski (MNE)

=== Women's tournament ===
Spain women's water polo team qualified for the Olympics by virtue of a top four finish at the Olympic Qualification Tournament in Gouda.

Team roster

The following is the Spanish roster in the women's water polo tournament of the 2016 Summer Olympics.

Head coach: Miki Oca

№	Name	Pos.	Height	Weight	Date of birth	Club
1	Laura Ester	GK	1.70 m (5 ft 7 in)	56 kg (123 lb)	22 January 1990	(Spain) Sabadell
2	Marta Bach	CB	1.76 m (5 ft 9 in)	66 kg (146 lb)	17 February 1993	(Spain) Mataró
3	Anna Espar	D	1.80 m (5 ft 11 in)	66 kg (146 lb)	8 January 1993	(Spain) Sabadell
4	Beatriz Ortiz	D	1.76 m (5 ft 9 in)	65 kg (143 lb)	21 June 1995	(Spain) Rubí
5	Matilde Ortiz	CB	1.74 m (5 ft 9 in)	64 kg (141 lb)	16 September 1990	(Spain) Sabadell
6	Paula Leitón	CF	1.87 m (6 ft 2 in)	93 kg (205 lb)	27 April 2000	(Spain) Terrassa
7	Clara Espar	D	1.77 m (5 ft 10 in)	70 kg (154 lb)	29 September 1994	(Spain) Sabadell
8	Pilar Peña	D	1.72 m (5 ft 8 in)	61 kg (134 lb)	4 April 1986	(Spain) Sabadell
9	Judith Forca	D	1.73 m (5 ft 8 in)	66 kg (146 lb)	7 June 1996	(Spain) Sabadell
10	Roser Tarragó	D	1.71 m (5 ft 7 in)	61 kg (134 lb)	25 March 1993	(Spain) Mataró
11	Maica García	CF	1.88 m (6 ft 2 in)	90 kg (198 lb)	17 October 1990	(Spain) Sabadell
12	Laura López	D	1.70 m (5 ft 7 in)	63 kg (139 lb)	13 January 1988	(Spain) Mataró
13	Patricia Herrera	GK	1.63 m (5 ft 4 in)	59 kg (130 lb)	9 February 1993	(Spain) Madrid Moscardó

Group play

Pos	Team	Pld	W	D	L	GF	GA	GD	Pts	Qualification
1	United States	3	3	0	0	34	14	+20	6	Quarter-finals
2	Spain	3	2	0	1	27	29	−2	4	Quarter-finals
3	Hungary	3	1	0	2	29	33	−4	2	Quarter-finals
4	China	3	0	0	3	23	37	−14	0	Quarter-finals

Source: Rio2016
Rules for classification: 1) Points; 2) Head-to-head points; 3) Head-to-head goal difference; 4) Head-to-head goals scored; 5) Goal difference.

9 August 2016; 11:40	Report	Spain	4–11	United States	Maria Lenk Aquatic Center, Rio de Janeiro; Referees: Daniel Flahive (AUS), Filippo Gomez (ITA)
9 August 2016; 11:40	Report	Score by quarters: 1–4, 1–3, 2–2, 0–2			Maria Lenk Aquatic Center, Rio de Janeiro; Referees: Daniel Flahive (AUS), Filippo Gomez (ITA)
9 August 2016; 11:40	Report	García 2	Goals	three players 2	Maria Lenk Aquatic Center, Rio de Janeiro; Referees: Daniel Flahive (AUS), Filippo Gomez (ITA)

11 August 2016; 13:00	Report	Spain	11–10	Hungary	Maria Lenk Aquatic Center, Rio de Janeiro; Referees: Marie-Claude Deslières (CAN), Vojin Putniković (SRB)
11 August 2016; 13:00	Report	Score by quarters: 2–2, 4–4, 4–1, 1–3			Maria Lenk Aquatic Center, Rio de Janeiro; Referees: Marie-Claude Deslières (CAN), Vojin Putniković (SRB)
11 August 2016; 13:00	Report	five players 2	Goals	Bujka 5	Maria Lenk Aquatic Center, Rio de Janeiro; Referees: Marie-Claude Deslières (CAN), Vojin Putniković (SRB)

13 August 2016; 09:00	Report	China	8–12	Spain	Maria Lenk Aquatic Center, Rio de Janeiro; Referees: Boris Margeta (SLO), German Moller (ARG)
13 August 2016; 09:00	Report	Score by quarters: 2–3, 4–4, 1–2, 1–3			Maria Lenk Aquatic Center, Rio de Janeiro; Referees: Boris Margeta (SLO), German Moller (ARG)
13 August 2016; 09:00	Report	Zhang Cong 3	Goals	López 4	Maria Lenk Aquatic Center, Rio de Janeiro; Referees: Boris Margeta (SLO), German Moller (ARG)

Quarterfinal

15 August 2016; 18:20	Report	Russia	12–10	Spain	Olympic Aquatics Stadium, Rio de Janeiro; Referees: Marie-Claude Deslières (CAN), Nenad Peris (CRO)
15 August 2016; 18:20	Report	Score by quarters: 2–3, 3–2, 5–3, 2–2			Olympic Aquatics Stadium, Rio de Janeiro; Referees: Marie-Claude Deslières (CAN), Nenad Peris (CRO)
15 August 2016; 18:20	Report	Fedotova 4	Goals	López, Tarragó 3	Olympic Aquatics Stadium, Rio de Janeiro; Referees: Marie-Claude Deslières (CAN), Nenad Peris (CRO)

Classification semifinal (5–8)

17 August 2016; 15:10	Report	Spain	11–6	China	Olympic Aquatics Stadium, Rio de Janeiro; Referees: Radosław Koryzna (POL), Fabio Toffoli (ITA)
17 August 2016; 15:10	Report	Score by quarters: 2–2, 2–0, 4–2, 3–2			Olympic Aquatics Stadium, Rio de Janeiro; Referees: Radosław Koryzna (POL), Fabio Toffoli (ITA)
17 August 2016; 15:10	Report	five players 2	Goals	Ma Huanhuan 2	Olympic Aquatics Stadium, Rio de Janeiro; Referees: Radosław Koryzna (POL), Fabio Toffoli (ITA)

Fifth place match

19 August 2016; 14:10	Report	Australia	10–12	Spain	Olympic Aquatics Stadium, Rio de Janeiro; Referees: Marie-Claude Deslières (CAN), Sergey Naumov (RUS)
19 August 2016; 14:10	Report	Score by quarters: 5–4, 2–3, 1–3, 2–2			Olympic Aquatics Stadium, Rio de Janeiro; Referees: Marie-Claude Deslières (CAN), Sergey Naumov (RUS)
19 August 2016; 14:10	Report	Buckling 3	Goals	Tarragó 7	Olympic Aquatics Stadium, Rio de Janeiro; Referees: Marie-Claude Deslières (CAN), Sergey Naumov (RUS)

== Weightlifting ==
Spanish weightlifters have qualified three men's places for the Rio Olympics based on their combined team standing by points at the 2014 and 2015 IWF World Championships. A single women's Olympic spot had been added to the Spanish roster by virtue of a top six national finish at the 2016 European Championships. The team must allocate these places to individual athletes by 20 June 2016.

The weightlifting team was named to the Olympic roster on 7 June 2016, with Lydia Valentín going to her third straight Olympics.

Athlete	Event	Snatch		Clean & jerk		Total	Rank
Athlete	Event	Result	Rank	Result	Rank	Total	Rank
Josué Brachi	Men's −56 kg	~~120~~	DNF	—	—	—	DNF
David Sánchez	Men's −69 kg	142	12	175	15	317	10
Andrés Mata	Men's −77 kg	153	8	190	7	343	7
Lydia Valentín	Women's −75 kg	116	2	141	3	257	3rd place, bronze medalist(s)

== Wrestling ==
Spain qualified one wrestler for the men's freestyle 74 kg into the Olympic competition, as a result of his semifinal triumph at the final meet of the World Qualification Tournament in Istanbul.

Key:

- VT – Victory by Fall.
- PP – Decision by Points – the loser with technical points.
- PO – Decision by Points – the loser without technical points.
- ST – Technical superiority – the loser without technical points and a margin of victory of at least 8 (Greco-Roman) or 10 (freestyle) points.

Men's freestyle

Athlete	Event	Qualification	Round of 16	Quarterfinal	Semifinal	Repechage 1	Repechage 2	Final / BM	
Athlete	Event	Opposition Result	Opposition Result	Opposition Result	Opposition Result	Opposition Result	Opposition Result	Opposition Result	Rank
Taimuraz Friev	−74 kg	López (CUB); L 1–3 ^{PP}	Did not advance						13

== See also ==
- Spain at the 2016 Summer Paralympics
