= Irene Otieno =

- Full name: Irene Awino Otieno
- Born: 26 March 1986 (age 40)
- Height: 1.62 m (5 ft 4 in)
- Weight: 58 kg (128 lb; 9 st 2 lb)

Rugby union career
- Position: Winger
National sevens team
Years	Team	Comps
- Kenya

Irene Awino Otieno (born 26 March 1986) is a Kenyan rugby sevens player. She represented the Kenya women's sevens team at the 2016 Summer Olympics. She was in Kenya's squad that played at the 2016 France Women's Sevens.
