= Catherine Abilla =

Kenyan rugby sevens player

- Born: 1 April 1989 (age 37) Nairobi, Kenya
- Height: 1.62 m (5 ft 4 in)
- Weight: 56 kg (123 lb)

Rugby union career
National sevens team
Years	Team	Comps
- Kenya

Catherine Awino Abilla (born 1 April 1989) is a Kenyan rugby sevens player. She was selected as a member of the Kenya women's national rugby sevens team to the 2016 Summer Olympics. Abilla was in the Kenyan team that featured at the 2016 France Women's Sevens in the 2015–16 World Rugby Women's Sevens Series.
