= Camilyne Oyuayo =

Kenyan rugby sevens player

- Born: 16 April 1982 (age 44)
- Height: 1.67 m (5 ft 5 1/2 in)
- Weight: 72 kg (159 lb; 11 st 5 lb)

Rugby union career
National sevens team
Years	Team	Comps
- Kenya

Camilyne Oyuayo (born 16 April 1982) is a Kenyan rugby sevens player. She was selected for the Kenyan women's national rugby sevens team for the 2016 Summer Olympics.
