= Vanessa Rial =

- Full name: Ana Vanessa Rial
- Born: 1 March 1982 (age 44)
- Height: 1.72 m (5 ft 8 in)
- Weight: 68 kg (150 lb)

Rugby union career
- Position: Fly-half
International career
Years	Team	Apps	(Points)
- Spain
National sevens team
Years	Team		Comps
- Spain 7s

Ana Vanessa Rial (born 1 March 1982) is a former Spanish rugby sevens player.

In 2013, she was selected for Spain's Sevens World Cup squad.

Rial competed for Spain's sevens team at the 2016 Summer Olympics. She was a member of their squad who were victorious and secured the last spot at the Rio Olympics.
