= Sheila Chajira =

Kenyan rugby sevens player

Personal information
- Full name: Sheila Kavugwe Chajira
- Born: December 20, 1993 (age 31)
- Height: 1.65 m (5 ft 5 in)
- Weight: 73 kg (161 lb; 11 st 7 lb)

Sport
- Country: Kenya
- Sport: Rugby sevens

Sheila Kavugwe Chajira (born December 20, 1993) is a female Kenyan rugby sevens player. She competed at the 2016 Summer Olympics as a member of the Kenyan women's national rugby sevens team. She played at the 2016 France Women's Sevens.
