= Janet Awino =

Kenyan rugby sevens player

- Full name: Janet Awuor Awino
- Born: August 8, 1985 (age 41)
- Height: 1.65 m (5 ft 5 in)
- Weight: 65 kg (143 lb)

Rugby union career
National sevens team
Years	Team	Comps
- Kenya

Janet Awuor Owino (also spelled Owino; born August 8, 1985) is a Kenyan rugby sevens player. She has been selected as a member of the Kenya women's national rugby sevens team to the 2016 Summer Olympics. She was in Kenya's sevens team for the 2016 France Women's Sevens.
