= Stacy Otieno =

- Full name: Stacy Awour Otieno
- Born: September 27, 1990 (age 36)
- Height: 1.67 m (5 ft 5 1/2 in)
- Weight: 71 kg (157 lb; 11 st 3 lb)

Rugby union career
National sevens team
Years	Team	Comps
- Kenya 7s

Stacy Awour Otieno (born September 27, 1990) is a Kenyan female rugby sevens player. She competed for the Kenya women's national rugby sevens team at the 2016 Summer Olympics. Otieno was also part of the Kenyan sevens team that made their debut in the World Rugby Women's Sevens Series at the 2016 France Women's Sevens.
