= Celestine Masinde =

- Born: January 12, 1987 (age 39)
- Height: 1.62 m (5 ft 4 in)
- Weight: 60 kg (130 lb; 9 st 6 lb)

Rugby union career
National sevens team
Years	Team	Comps
- Kenya

Celestine Navalayo Masinde (born January 12, 1987) is a Kenyan rugby sevens player. She competed at the 2016 Summer Olympics in the women's rugby sevens competition for the Kenya women's national rugby sevens team. She scored Kenya's first ever Olympic try in their match against France.

Masinde was in the squad that featured at the 2016 France Women's Sevens.
