= Rachael Mbogo =

- Born: December 20, 1982 (age 43)
- Height: 1.7 m (5 ft 7 in)
- Weight: 64 kg (141 lb; 10 st 1 lb)

Rugby union career
National sevens team
Years	Team	Comps
- Kenya 7s

Rachael Adhiambo Mbogo (born December 20, 1982) is a Kenyan rugby sevens player. She competed for the Kenyan women's national rugby sevens team at the 2016 Summer Olympics. She also was in Kenya's squad for the 2016 France Women's Sevens.
