= Pauline Biscarat =

French rugby sevens player

- Born: 8 May 1989 (age 37)
- Height: 1.57 m (5 ft 2 in)
- Weight: 53 kg (117 lb)

Rugby union career
- Position: Scrum half
National sevens team
Years	Team	Comps
- France

Pauline Biscarat (born 8 May 1989) is a French rugby sevens player. She was selected as a member of the France women's national rugby sevens team to the 2016 Summer Olympics.
