= Linet Arasa =

Kenyan rugby sevens player

- Full name: Linet Arasa Moraa
- Born: January 1, 1996 (age 30)
- Height: 173 cm (5 ft 8 in)
- Weight: 61 kg (134 lb)

Rugby union career
National sevens team
Years	Team	Comps
- Kenya

Linet Arasa (born January 1, 1996) is a Kenyan rugby sevens player. She competed at the 2016 Summer Olympics for the Kenyan women's national sevens team.
