= Bárbara Pla =

Spanish rugby player (born 1983)

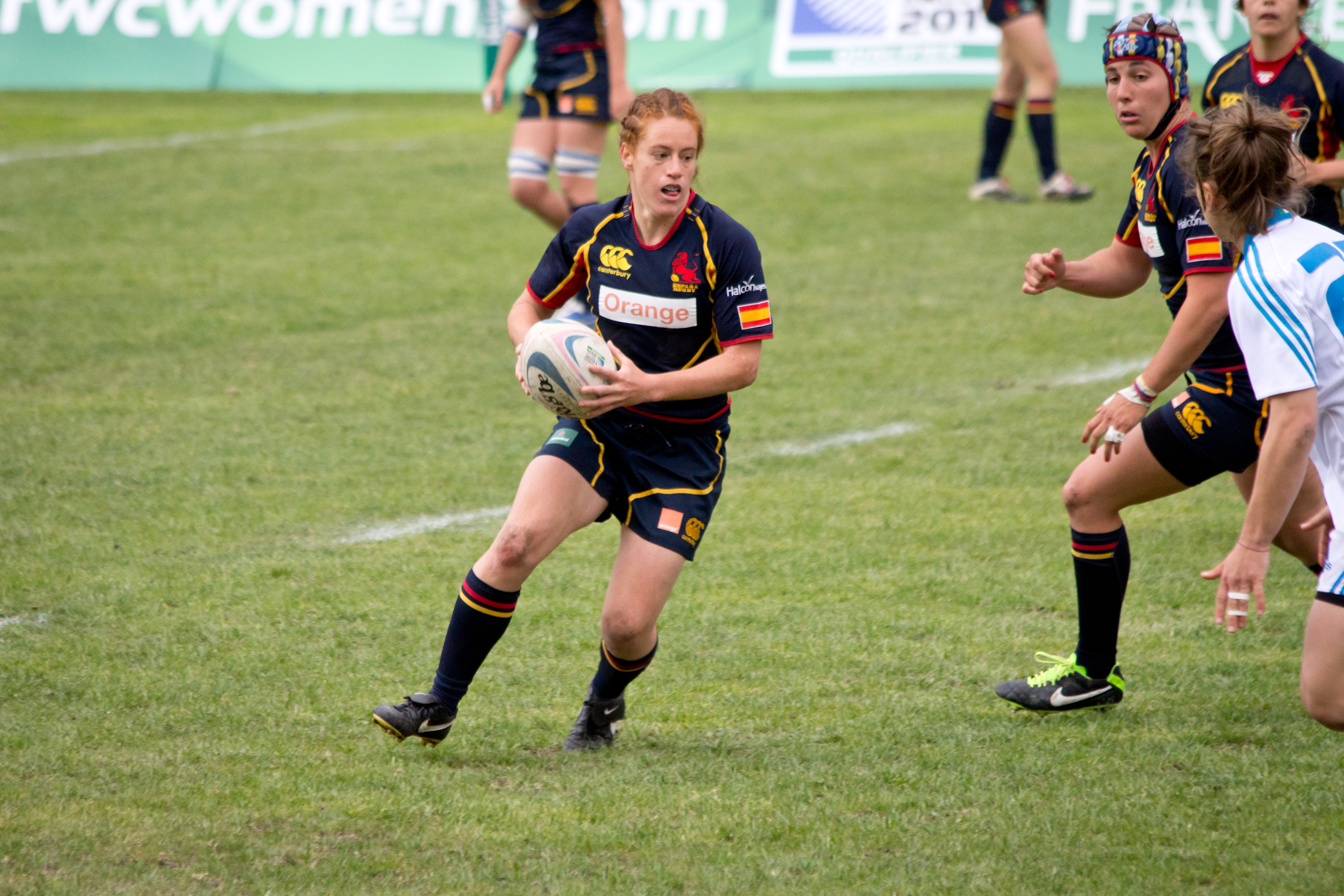
- Pla (with the ball) in 2013
- Full name: Bárbara Pla Vegué
- Born: 17 July 1983 (age 43) Barcelona, Spain
- Height: 1.62 m (5 ft 4 in)
- Weight: 61 kg (134 lb; 9 st 8 lb)
- Notable relative: Pol Pla (Brother)

Rugby union career
- Position: Scrum-half
Senior career
Years	Team	Apps	(Points)
2003-2007	Club Esportiu INEF Barcelona		
2007-2020	Getxo RT		
2012-2013	Bizkarians R.E.		
2020-2021	Eibar RT		
2021-2024	Getxo RT		
International career
Years	Team	Apps	(Points)
2004-2017	Spain	53	
National sevens team
Years	Team		Comps
	Spain		328

Bárbara Pla Vegué (born 17 July 1983) is a former Spanish rugby sevens player and coach.

She competed for the Spanish sevens team at the 2016 Summer Olympics. She and her brother Pol, both represented Spain at the Olympics in rugby sevens. She also played at the qualification tournament for the final spot in Ireland.

Pla was on the 2013 Rugby World Cup Sevens squad for Spain.
