= Doreen Nziwa =

- Born: July 4, 1982 (age 44)
- Height: 1.57 m (5 ft 2 in)
- Weight: 70 kg (154 lb)

Rugby union career
- Position: Fly half
National sevens team
Years	Team	Comps
- Kenya

Doreen Remour Nziwa (born July 4, 1982) is a Kenyan rugby sevens player. She represented Kenya's women's national rugby sevens team at the 2016 Summer Olympics. She was in the Kenyan women's sevens squad that played at the 2016 France Women's Sevens.
