= Janet Okelo =

- Full name: Janet Musindalo Okelo
- Born: May 5, 1992 (age 34)
- Height: 1.72 m (5 ft 8 in)
- Weight: 60 kg (132 lb)

Rugby union career
National sevens team
Years	Team	Comps
- Kenya

Janet Musindalo Okelo (born May 5, 1992) is a Kenyan rugby sevens player. She was a member of the Kenyan women's national rugby sevens team for the 2016 Summer Olympics.
