= 2016 France Women's Sevens =

- Women's Sevens Series IV
- Host nation: France
- Date: 28 – 29 May 2016

Cup
- Champion: Canada
- Runner-up: Australia
- Third: New Zealand

Plate
- Winner: France
- Runner-up: United States

Bowl
- Winner: Russia
- Runner-up: Ireland

Tournament details
- Matches played: 34

The 2016 France Sevens was the fifth tournament within the 2015–16 World Rugby Women's Sevens Series. It was held over the weekend of 28–29 May 2016 at Stade Gabriel Montpied in Clermont-Ferrand, France.

== Format ==
The teams were drawn into three pools of four teams each. Each team played everyone in their pool one time. The top two teams from each pool advanced to the Cup/Plate brackets while the top 2 third place teams will also compete in the Cup/Plate. The rest of the teams from each group went to the Bowl brackets.

== Teams ==
- Australia
- Canada
- England
- Fiji
- France
- Ireland
- Japan
- Kenya
- New Zealand
- Russia
- Spain
- United States

== Pool Stage ==
Key to colours in group tables
Teams that advance to the Cup Quarterfinal

=== Pool A ===
Team	Pld	W	D	L	PF	PA	PD	Pts
England	3	3	0	0	74	14	+60	9
Spain	3	2	0	1	56	41	+15	7
United States	3	1	0	2	48	38	+10	5
Kenya	3	0	0	3	5	90	-85	3

28 May 2016

England	26–7	United States

Stade Gabriel Montpied, Clermont-Ferrand

28 May 2016

Spain	37–5	Kenya

Stade Gabriel Montpied, Clermont-Ferrand

28 May 2016

England	22–0	Kenya

Stade Gabriel Montpied, Clermont-Ferrand

28 May 2016

Spain	12–10	United States

Stade Gabriel Montpied, Clermont-Ferrand

28 May 2016

England	26–7	Spain

Stade Gabriel Montpied, Clermont-Ferrand

28 May 2016

United States	31–0	Kenya

Stade Gabriel Montpied, Clermont-Ferrand

=== Pool B ===
Team	Pld	W	D	L	PF	PA	PD	Pts
New Zealand	3	3	0	0	91	17	+74	9
Canada	3	2	0	1	67	43	+24	7
Russia	3	1	0	2	31	78	-47	5
Japan	3	0	0	3	32	80	-48	3

28 May 2016

New Zealand	32–0	Russia

Stade Gabriel Montpied, Clermont-Ferrand

28 May 2016

Canada	21–12	Japan

Stade Gabriel Montpied, Clermont-Ferrand

28 May 2016

New Zealand	40–0	Japan

Stade Gabriel Montpied, Clermont-Ferrand

28 May 2016

Canada	29–12	Russia

Stade Gabriel Montpied, Clermont-Ferrand

28 May 2016

New Zealand	19–17	Canada

Stade Gabriel Montpied, Clermont-Ferrand

28 May 2016

Russia	19–17	Japan

Stade Gabriel Montpied, Clermont-Ferrand

=== Pool C ===
Team	Pld	W	D	L	PF	PA	PD	Pts
Australia	3	3	0	0	93	17	+76	9
Fiji	3	2	0	1	33	58	-25	7
France	3	1	0	2	62	33	+29	5
Ireland	3	0	0	3	19	99	-80	3

28 May 2016

Australia	34–0	Fiji

Stade Gabriel Montpied, Clermont-Ferrand

28 May 2016

France	40–0	Ireland

Stade Gabriel Montpied, Clermont-Ferrand

28 May 2016

Australia	40–5	Ireland

Stade Gabriel Montpied, Clermont-Ferrand

28 May 2016

France	10–14	Fiji

Stade Gabriel Montpied, Clermont-Ferrand

28 May 2016

Australia	19–12	France

Stade Gabriel Montpied, Clermont-Ferrand

28 May 2016

Fiji	19–14	Ireland

Stade Gabriel Montpied, Clermont-Ferrand

== Knockout stage ==
=== Bowl ===
Semi-finals
29 May 2016 – Clermont-Ferrand
Russia	27
Kenya	12
29 May 2016 – Clermont-Ferrand
Japan	0
Ireland	33

Final
29 May 2016 – Clermont-Ferrand
Russia	24
Ireland	5
Third place
29 May 2016 – Clermont-Ferrand
Kenya	12
Japan	5

=== Plate ===
Quarter-finals
29 May 2016 – Clermont-Ferrand
England	21
United States	12
29 May 2016 – Clermont-Ferrand
Canada	12
Fiji	5
29 May 2016 – Clermont-Ferrand
New Zealand	19
France	12
29 May 2016 – Clermont-Ferrand
Australia	35
Spain	0

Semi-finals
29 May 2016 – Clermont-Ferrand
United States	14
Fiji	12
29 May 2016 – Clermont-Ferrand
France	17
Spain	0

Final
29 May 2016 – Clermont-Ferrand
United States	19
France	22
Third place
29 May 2016 – Clermont-Ferrand
Fiji	10
Spain	13

=== Cup ===
Quarter-finals
29 May 2016 – Clermont-Ferrand
England	21
United States	12
29 May 2016 – Clermont-Ferrand
Canada	12
Fiji	5
29 May 2016 – Clermont-Ferrand
New Zealand	19
France	12
29 May 2016 – Clermont-Ferrand
Australia	35
Spain	0

Semi-finals
29 May 2016 – Clermont-Ferrand
England	10
Canada	31
29 May 2016 – Clermont-Ferrand
New Zealand	5
Australia	14

Final
29 May 2016 – Clermont-Ferrand
Canada	29
Australia	19
Third place
29 May 2016 – Clermont-Ferrand
England	5
New Zealand	22
