= Rugby sevens at the 2016 Summer Olympics – Women's tournament =

2016 Women's Olympic Rugby sevens Tournament
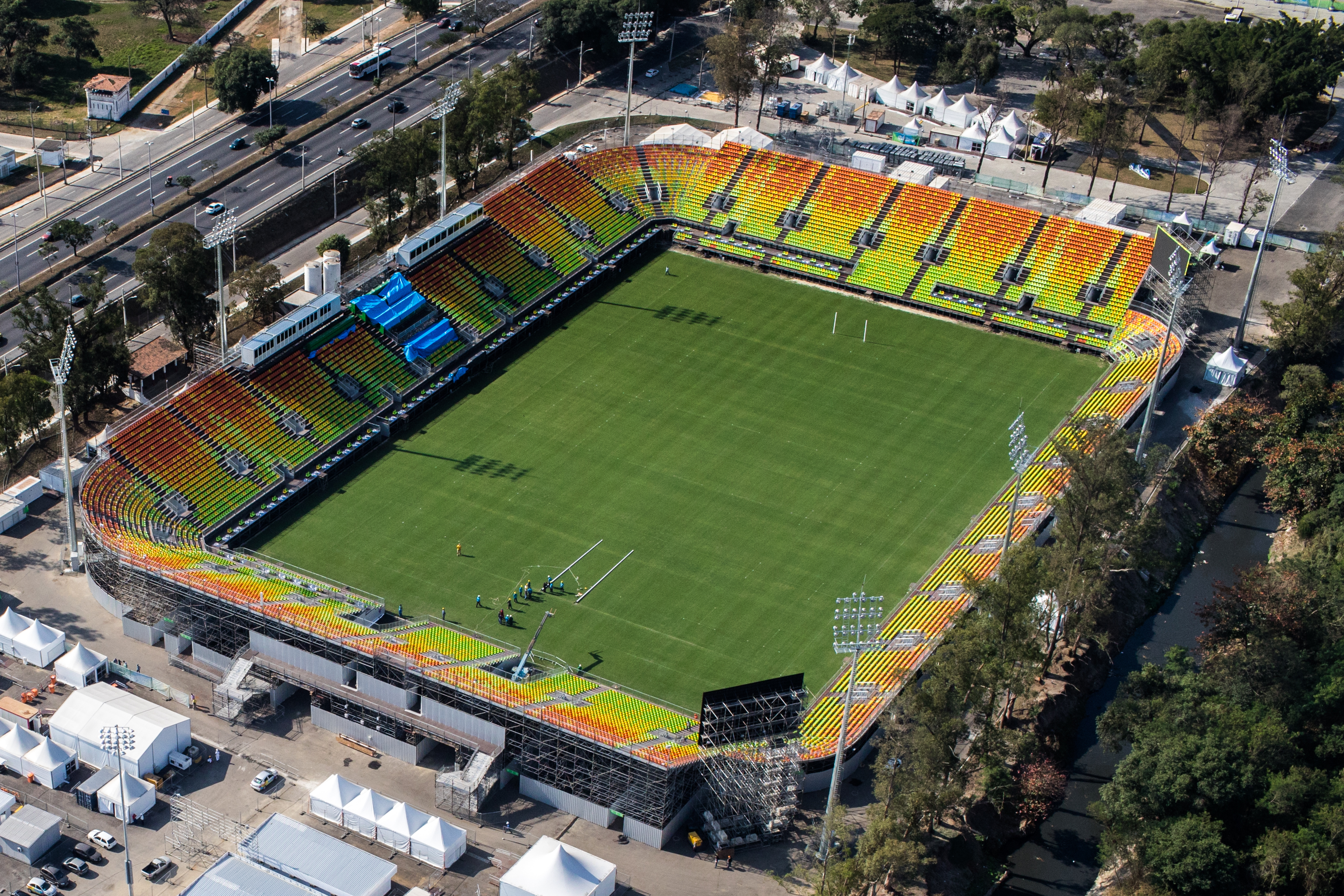
- Aerial view of the Deodoro Stadium, where the Women's Rugby Sevens tournament took place

Tournament details
- Host: Brazil
- Venue: Deodoro Stadium
- Date: 6–8 August 2016
- Teams: 12

Final positions
- Champions: Australia (1st title)
- Runner-up: New Zealand
- Third place: Canada
- Fourth place: Great Britain

Tournament statistics
- Matches played: 34
- Tries scored: 180 (5.29 per match)
- Top scorer(s): (New Zealand) Portia Woodman (50 points)
- Most tries: (New Zealand) Portia Woodman (10 tries)

The women's rugby sevens tournament at the 2016 Summer Olympics was held in Brazil, hosted at the Deodoro Stadium, a temporary outdoor stadium constructed as part of the Deodoro Modern Pentathlon Park in Rio de Janeiro. The tournament was held from 6 August to 8 August 2016, starting with group matches before finishing with the medal ceremony on 8 August.

Australia beat New Zealand 24–17 in the final. Canada secured the bronze medal with a win over Great Britain.

== Qualification ==
With Brazil being the hosts, their team automatically qualified despite their sevens team not regularly appearing in the top 6 on the World Rugby Women's Sevens Series. The 2014–15 World Rugby Women's Sevens Series was the initial stage of qualification, where the top 4 teams at the end of the series gaining qualification to the 2016 Olympic Games. Between June and September 2015, each of the six regional rugby unions held an Olympic qualification event, where one team from each region qualified, bring the total up to 11 team qualified. The final spot was determined by a repechage tournament held in Monaco, where the winner of that event became the final team to qualify for the 2016 Olympic Games.

As a result of England finishing fourth in the 2014–15 Sevens World Series, Great Britain were awarded a spot in the Olympic games, despite the other nations failing to qualify in the top 4. This is because Great Britain compete as one union in the Olympics and as several in international rugby (England, Wales, Scotland and a combined union from Northern Ireland and Republic of Ireland), which meant should one of either the England, Wales or Scotland teams qualify, then Great Britain would be awarded a spot in the Olympic Games. It was decided players based in Northern Ireland were not eligible to represent Great Britain in the rugby sevens tournament as these players represent the IRFU, and the union demanded that Northern Irish players, that have committed to play for the Irish rugby union, only play for Ireland despite being eligible under IOC rules to compete for Great Britain. The three remaining unions agreed in advance of the 2013–14 Sevens World Series that their highest-finishing teams in that season would represent all three unions in the first stage of qualification.

=== Qualified teams ===
Nation	Means of qualification
Brazil	Host nation
Australia	2014–15 World Rugby Women's Sevens Series top 4 finishers
Canada	2014–15 World Rugby Women's Sevens Series top 4 finishers
Great Britain	2014–15 World Rugby Women's Sevens Series top 4 finishers
New Zealand	2014–15 World Rugby Women's Sevens Series top 4 finishers
Colombia	2015 CONSUR Women's Sevens Champions
United States	2015 NACRA Women's Sevens Champions
France	2015 Rugby Europe Women's Sevens Grand Prix Champions
Kenya	2015 Women's Africa Cup Sevens Champions
Fiji	2015 Oceania Women's Sevens Championship Champions
Japan	2015 ARFU Women's Sevens Championships Champions
Spain	2016 Women's Final Olympic Qualification Tournament Champions

== Match officials ==
On 11 April 2016, World Rugby announced a panel of twelve match officials for the women's sevens. Two Brazilians were later added as assistant referees.

- Aimee Barrett (South Africa)
- Jess Beard (New Zealand)
- Beatrice Benvenuti (Italy)
- James Bolabiu (Fiji)
- Sara Cox (Great Britain)
- Sakurako Kawasaki (Japan)
- Rose Labreche (Canada)
- Gabriel Lee (Hong Kong)
- Alhambra Nievas (Spain)
- Amy Perrett (Australia)
- Alex Pratt (Great Britain)
- Rasta Rasivhenge (South Africa)
- Mariana Wyse (Brazil) – Assistant referee
- Nayara Lima (Brazil) – Assistant referee

== Draw ==
The draw for the tournament took place on 28 June 2016. The 12 teams were seeded based on their points they have accumulated over the past two seasons on the Women's Sevens Series circuit. The four teams that qualified directly from the 2014–15 Women's Sevens World Series were guaranteed a top four seeding, with their positioning determined by their combined score over the two seasons.

Seed 1	Seed 2	Seed 3
Australia (1); New Zealand (2); Canada (3); Great Britain (4)	France (5); United States (6); Fiji (7); Spain (8)	Brazil (9); Japan (10); Kenya (11); Colombia (12)

== Pool stage ==
Group winners and runners-up advance to the quarter-finals. Third place teams drop to a third-placed teams table, where the top two third placed teams advance to the quarter-finals.

=== Pool A ===
Pos	Team	Pld	W	D	L	PF	PA	PD	Pts	Qualification
1	Australia	3	2	1	0	101	12	+89	8	Quarter-finals
2	Fiji	3	2	0	1	48	43	+5	7	Quarter-finals
3	United States	3	1	1	1	67	24	+43	6	Quarter-finals
4	Colombia	3	0	0	3	0	137	−137	3	

Source: World Rugby
Rules for classification: 1) Points; 2) Head-to-head result; 3) Point difference; 4) Points scored.

6 August 2016
13:00

United States	7–12	Fiji
Try: Kelter 10' c Con: Baravilala (1/1)	Report (Rio 2016); Report (World Rugby)	Try: Tisolo 4' c Ravisa 8' m Con: Tisolo (1/2)

Deodoro Stadium, Rio de Janeiro
Referee: Rasta Rasivhenge (South Africa)

6 August 2016
13:30

Australia	53–0	Colombia
Try: Williams 1' m Caslick (3) 3' c, 7' m, 8' c Tonegato 5' m Parry 7' m Beck (2) 10' c, 13' c Turner 12' m Con: Dalton (3/8); Etheridge (1/1)	Report (Rio 2016); Report (World Rugby)

Deodoro Stadium, Rio de Janeiro
Referee: Jess Beard (New Zealand)

6 August 2016
18:00

United States	48–0	Colombia
Try: Kelter (2) 1' c, 6' c Doyle 6' m Johnson (2) 7' m, 13' m Javelet 8' c Carlyle 11' c Fa'avesi 14' m Con: Kelter (2/3); Baravilala (2/3); Stephens (0/2)	Report (Rio 2016); Report (World Rugby)

Deodoro Stadium, Rio de Janeiro
Referee: Beatrice Benvenuti (Italy)

6 August 2016
18:30

Australia	36–0	Fiji
Try: Cherry 1' c Tonegato (2) 4' m, 13' c Caslick 5' c Green 10' m Dalton 14' m Con: Dalton (3/6)	Report (Rio 2016); Report (World Rugby)

Deodoro Stadium, Rio de Janeiro
Referee: Sara Cox (Great Britain)

7 August 2016
13:00

Fiji	36–0	Colombia
Try: Daveau (2) 1' c, 3' m Tinai 5' c Roqica 7' m Riwai 9' c Nagasau 14' m Con: Tinai (2/4); Riwai (1/1); Tisolo (0/1)	Report (Rio 2016); Report (World Rugby)

Deodoro Stadium, Rio de Janeiro
Referee: Rose Labreche (Canada)

7 August 2016
13:30

Australia	12–12	United States
Try: Tonegato (2) 4' m, 14' c Con: Dalton (1/2)	Report (Rio 2016); Report (World Rugby)	Try: Javelet (2) 9' c, 11' m Con: Baravilala (1/2)

Deodoro Stadium, Rio de Janeiro
Referee: Alhambra Nievas (Spain)

=== Pool B ===
Pos	Team	Pld	W	D	L	PF	PA	PD	Pts	Qualification
1	New Zealand	3	3	0	0	109	12	+97	9	Quarter-finals
2	France	3	2	0	1	71	40	+31	7	Quarter-finals
3	Spain	3	1	0	2	31	65	−34	5	Quarter-finals
4	Kenya	3	0	0	3	17	111	−94	3	

Source: World Rugby
Rules for classification: 1) Points; 2) Head-to-head result; 3) Point difference; 4) Points scored.

6 August 2016
11:00

France	24–7	Spain
Try: Grassineau 3' c Guérin 7' m Ladagnous 9' c Guiglion 13' m Con: Biscarat (2/4)	Report (Rio 2016); Report (World Rugby)	Try: P. García 11' c Con: P. García (1/1)

Deodoro Stadium, Rio de Janeiro
Referee: Amy Perrett (Australia)

6 August 2016
11:30

New Zealand	52–0	Kenya
Try: Woodman (3) 1' c, 8' c, 13' m McAlister (2) 3' c, 14' m Manuel 6' c Broughton 10' c Williams 14' c Con: Nathan-Wong (5/6); Brazier (1/2)	Report (Rio 2016); Report (World Rugby)

Deodoro Stadium, Rio de Janeiro
Referee: Sara Cox (Great Britain)

6 August 2016
16:00

France	40–7	Kenya
Try: Ladagnous (2) 4' c, 14' m Le Pesq 7' c Horta 8' c Guérin 11' c Amiel 14' c Con: Le Pesq (4/5); Biscarat (1/1)	Report (Rio 2016); Report (World Rugby)	Try: Masinde 7' c Con: Awino (1/1)

Deodoro Stadium, Rio de Janeiro
Referee: Alhambra Nievas (Spain)

6 August 2016
16:30

New Zealand	31–5	Spain
Try: Woodman 2' m McAlister (2) 3' c, 12' m Nathan-Wong 8' c Fitzpatrick 14' c Con: Nathan-Wong (3/5)	Report (Rio 2016); Report (World Rugby)	Try: Casado 11' m Con: P. García (0/1)

Deodoro Stadium, Rio de Janeiro
Referee: Gabriel Lee (Hong Kong)

7 August 2016
11:00

Spain	19–10	Kenya
Try: Plà 1' m Bravo (2) 9' c, 12' c Con: P. García (2/3)	Report (Rio 2016); Report (World Rugby)	Try: Nziwa 6' m Okelo 14' m Con: Awino (0/2)

Deodoro Stadium, Rio de Janeiro
Referee: James Bolabiu (Fiji)

7 August 2016
11:30

New Zealand	26–7	France
Try: Brazier 1' c Manuel 3' c Woodman 6' m McAlister 13' c Con: Nathan-Wong (3/4)	Report (Rio 2016); Report (World Rugby)	Try: Grassineau 7' c Con: Biscarat (1/1)

Deodoro Stadium, Rio de Janeiro
Referee: Rasta Rasivhenge (South Africa)

=== Pool C ===
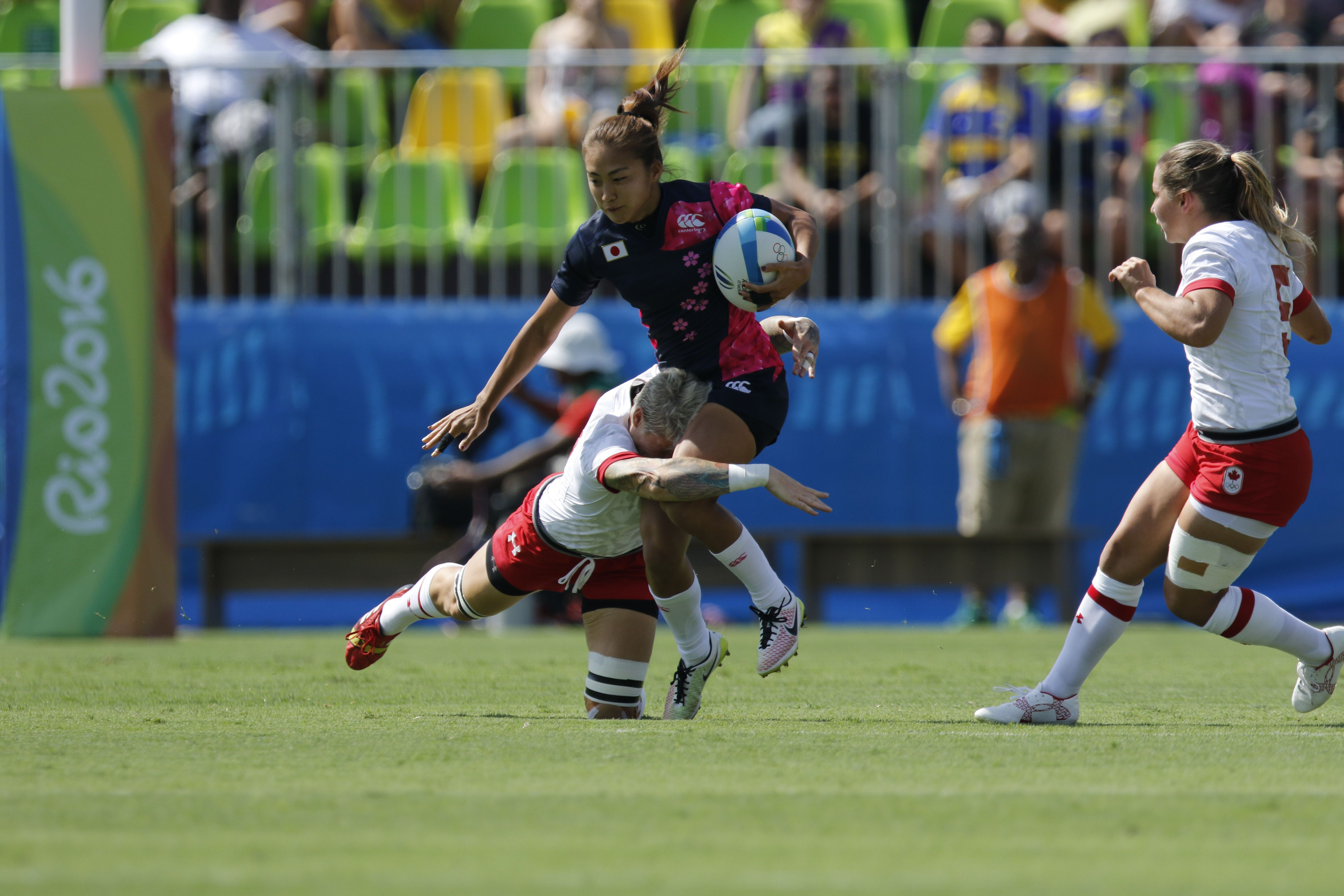
Canada vs Japan

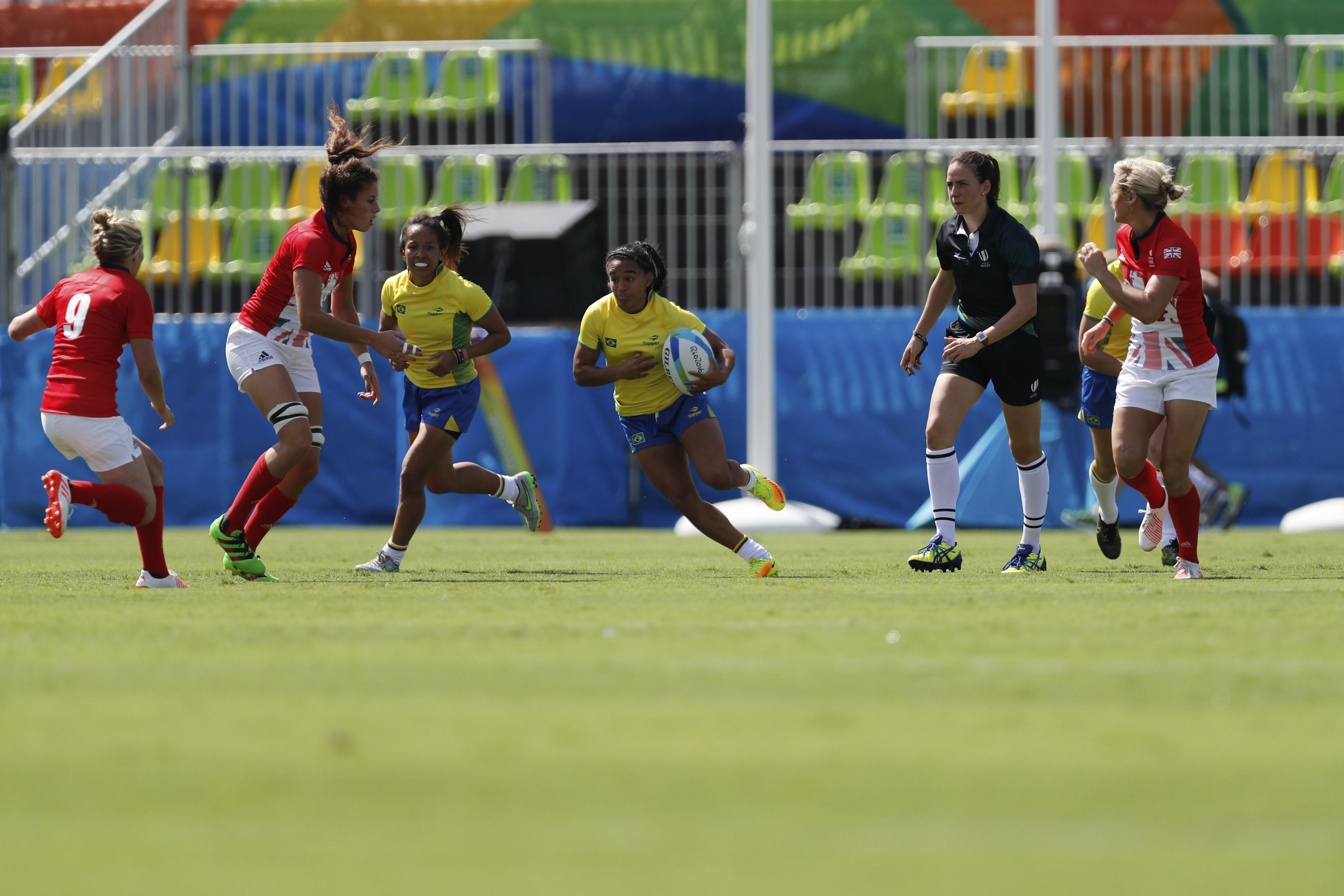
Brazil vs Great Britain

Pos	Team	Pld	W	D	L	PF	PA	PD	Pts	Qualification
1	Great Britain	3	3	0	0	91	3	+88	9	Quarter-finals
2	Canada	3	2	0	1	83	22	+61	7	Quarter-finals
3	Brazil (H)	3	1	0	2	29	77	−48	5	
4	Japan	3	0	0	3	10	111	−101	3	

Source: World Rugby
Rules for classification: 1) Points; 2) Head-to-head result; 3) Point difference; 4) Points scored.
(H) Hosts

6 August 2016
12:00

Great Britain	29–3	Brazil
Try: Watmore 5' c Hunt (2) 9' c, 12' m Joyce 14' m Scott 14' m Con: McLean (2/3); Watmore (0/2)	Report (Rio 2016); Report (World Rugby)	Pen: Kochhann (1/1) 7'

Deodoro Stadium, Rio de Janeiro
Referee: Alhambra Nievas (Spain)

6 August 2016
12:30

Canada	45–0	Japan
Try: Landry (2) 1' c, 6' c Moleschi 3' c Farella (2) 4' m, 9' m Benn 13' c Watcham-Roy 14' c Con: Landry (3/4); Russell (2/3)	Report (Rio 2016); Report (World Rugby)

Deodoro Stadium, Rio de Janeiro
Referee: James Bolabiu (Fiji)

6 August 2016
17:00

Great Britain	40–0	Japan
Try: Wilson-Hardy 1' c Richardson 4' c Watmore 6' c McLean 7' m Scott 10' c Fisher 16' c Con: Richardson (3/3); McLean (0/1); Scott (2/2)	Report (Rio 2016); Report (World Rugby)

Deodoro Stadium, Rio de Janeiro
Referee: Rasta Rasivhenge (South Africa)

6 August 2016
17:30

Canada	38–0	Brazil
Try: Paquin (2) 1' c, 7' c Kish 5' m Moleschi 6' c Farella (2) 12' c, 17' m Con: Russell (3/4); Landry (1/2)	Report (Rio 2016); Report (World Rugby)

Deodoro Stadium, Rio de Janeiro
Referee: Amy Perrett (Australia)

7 August 2016
12:00

Brazil	26–10	Japan
Try: Ishibashi 2' m Muhlbauer (2) 10' c, 14' c Araújo 12' c Con: Kochhann (2/3); Balconi (1/1)	Report (Rio 2016); Report (World Rugby)	Try: Kuwai 7' m Yamaguchi 8' m Con: Okuroda (0/2)

Deodoro Stadium, Rio de Janeiro
Referee: Gabriel Lee (Hong Kong)

7 August 2016
12:30

Canada	0–22	Great Britain
	Report (Rio 2016); Report (World Rugby)	Try: Richardson 4' m Wilson-Hardy 6' m Scarratt (2) 10' m, 12' c Con: Richardson (1/2); McLean (0/2)

Deodoro Stadium, Rio de Janeiro
Referee: Jess Beard (New Zealand)

=== Ranking of third-placed teams ===
The top two of the third-placed teams advance to the knockout rounds.

Pos	Grp	Team	Pld	W	D	L	PF	PA	PD	Pts	Qualification
1	A	United States	3	1	1	1	67	24	+43	6	Knockout stage
2	B	Spain	3	1	0	2	31	65	−34	5	Knockout stage
3	C	Brazil (H)	3	1	0	2	29	77	−48	5	

Source: Rio2016
Rules for classification: 1) Points; 2) Point differential; 3) Points scored; 4) Lots drawn by World Rugby
(H) Hosts

== Knockout stage ==
=== 9–12th place playoff ===
Semi-finals
7 August 2016 – Deodoro Stadium
Brazil	24
Colombia	0
7 August 2016 – Deodoro Stadium
Kenya	0
Japan	24

9th place final
8 August 2016 – Deodoro Stadium
Brazil	33
Japan	5
11th place
8 August 2016 – Deodoro Stadium
Colombia	10
Kenya	22

==== Semi-finals ====
7 August 2016
16:00

Brazil	24–0	Colombia
Try: Ramalho 3' m Teles (2) 6' c, 7' m Muhlbauer 9' c Con: Kochhann (2/4)	Report (Rio 2016); Report (World Rugby)

Deodoro Stadium, Rio de Janeiro
Referee: Sakurako Kawasaki (Japan)

7 August 2016
16:30

Kenya	0–24	Japan
	Report (Rio 2016); Report (World Rugby)	Try: Yamaguchi (2) 2' m, 6' c Kuwai 8' m Kanematsu 13' c Con: Okuroda (1/2); Yamanaka (1/2)

Deodoro Stadium, Rio de Janeiro
Referee: Aimee Barrett (South Africa)

==== 11th place ====
8 August 2016
12:30

Colombia	10–22	Kenya
Try: S. Acevedo 1' m Medina 7' m Con: Lopera (0/2)	Report (Rio 2016); Report (World Rugby)	Try: Okelo (2) 4' m, 11' c I. Otieno 9' m Masinde 14' m Con: Awino (1/3); Nziwa (0/1)

Deodoro Stadium, Rio de Janeiro
Referee: Rose Labreche (Canada)

==== 9th place final ====
8 August 2016
13:00

Brazil	33–5	Japan
Try: Muhlbauer 5' c Campos 7' m Ishibashi 8' c Scatrut 9' c Cerullo 13' c Con: Kochhann (4/5)	Report (Rio 2016); Report (World Rugby)	Try: Okuroda 3' m Con: Okuroda (0/1)

Deodoro Stadium, Rio de Janeiro
Referee: Alhambra Nievas (Spain)

=== 5–8th place playoff ===
Semi-finals
8 August 2016 – Deodoro Stadium
Spain	12
France	24
8 August 2016 – Deodoro Stadium
Fiji	7
United States	12

5th Place final
8 August 2016 – Deodoro Stadium
France	5
United States	19
7th Place
8 August 2016 – Deodoro Stadium
Spain	21
Fiji	0

==== Semi-finals ====
8 August 2016
13:30

Spain	12–24	France
Try: Erbina 12' c Etxebarría 14' m Con: P. García (1/2)	Report (Rio 2016); Report (World Rugby)	Try: Mayans 1' m Guérin (3) 3' c, 7' m, 9' c Con: Le Pesq (1/3); Biscarat (1/1)

Deodoro Stadium, Rio de Janeiro
Referee: James Bolabiu (Fiji)

8 August 2016
14:00

Fiji	7–12	United States
Try: Tavo 4' c Con: Tinai (1/1)	Report (Rio 2016); Report (World Rugby)	Try: Kelter 10' c Stephens 12' m Con: Kelter (1/1); Baravilala (0/1)

Deodoro Stadium, Rio de Janeiro
Referee: Jess Beard (New Zealand)

==== 7th place ====
8 August 2016
17:30

Spain	21–0	Fiji
Try: P. García 3' c Erbina 5' c Etxebarría 7' c Con: P. García (3/3)	Report (Rio 2016); Report (World Rugby)

Deodoro Stadium, Rio de Janeiro
Referee: Beatrice Benvenuti (Italy)

==== 5th place final ====
8 August 2016
18:00

France	5–19	United States
Try: Grassineau 6' m Con: Le Pesq (0/1)	Report (Rio 2016); Report (World Rugby)	Try: Kelter 8' c Javelet 9' m Fa'avesi 11' c Con: Kelter (1/2); Stephens (1/1)

Deodoro Stadium, Rio de Janeiro
Referee: Sara Cox (Great Britain)

=== Medal playoff ===
Quarter-finals
7 August 2016 – Deodoro Stadium
Australia	24
Spain	0
7 August 2016 – Deodoro Stadium
Canada	15
France	5
7 August 2016 – Deodoro Stadium
Great Britain	26
Fiji	7
7 August 2016 – Deodoro Stadium
New Zealand	5
United States	0

Semi-finals
8 August 2016 – Deodoro Stadium
Australia	17
Canada	5
8 August 2016 – Deodoro Stadium
Great Britain	7
New Zealand	25

Gold Medal Match
8 August 2016 – Deodoro Stadium
Australia	24
New Zealand	17
Bronze Medal Match
8 August 2016 – Deodoro Stadium
Canada	33
Great Britain	10

==== Quarter-finals ====
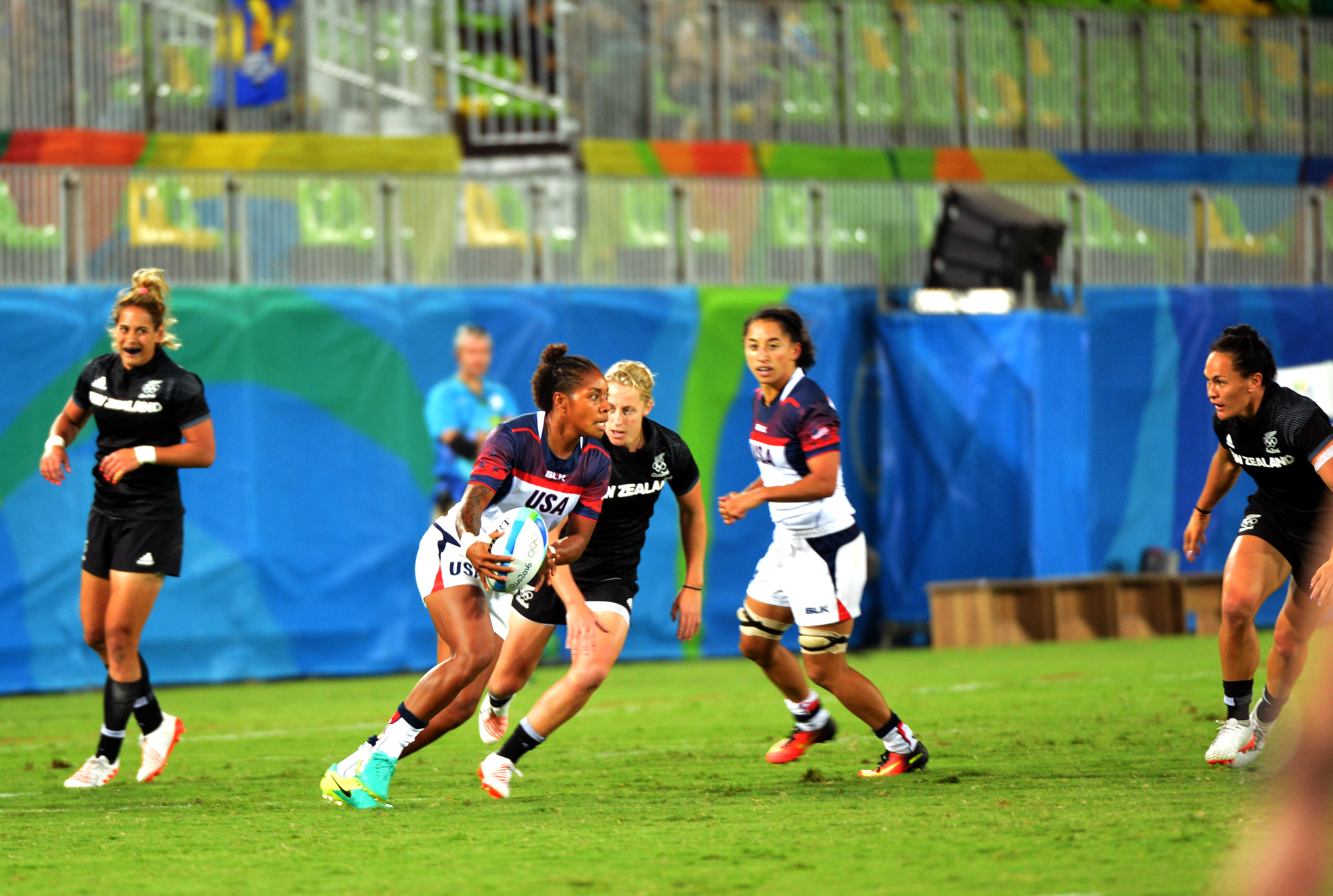
USA vs New Zealand

7 August 2016
17:00

Australia	24–0	Spain
Try: Tonegato 3' m Caslick (2) 5' c, 9' c Green 14' m Con: Dalton (2/3); Etheridge (0/1)	Report (Rio 2016); Report (World Rugby)

Deodoro Stadium, Rio de Janeiro
Referee: Jess Beard (New Zealand)

7 August 2016
17:30

Canada	15–5	France
Try: Moleschi 6' m Farella 12' m Landry 14' m Con: Landry (0/2); Russell (0/1)	Report (Rio 2016); Report (World Rugby)	Try: Le Pesq 3' m Con: Le Pesq (0/1)

Deodoro Stadium, Rio de Janeiro
Referee: Amy Perrett (Australia)

7 August 2016
18:00

Great Britain	26–7	Fiji
Try: Brown (2) 1' c, 12' c Richardson 4' c Waterman 7' m Con: McLean (3/4)	Report (Rio 2016); Report (World Rugby)	Try: Naiqato 3' c Con: Tinai (1/1)

Deodoro Stadium, Rio de Janeiro
Referee: Alhambra Nievas (Spain)

7 August 2016
18:30

New Zealand	5–0	United States
Try: Woodman 7' m Con: Nathan-Wong (0/1)	Report (Rio 2016); Report (World Rugby)

Deodoro Stadium, Rio de Janeiro
Referee: Rasta Rasivhenge (South Africa)

==== Semi-finals ====
8 August 2016
14:30

Australia	17–5	Canada
Try: Cherry (2) 2' c, 7' m Dalton 10' m Con: Dalton (1/3)	Report (Rio 2016); Report (World Rugby)	Try: Williams 13' m Con: Landry (0/1)

Deodoro Stadium, Rio de Janeiro
Referee: Rasta Rasivhenge (South Africa)

8 August 2016
15:00

Great Britain	7–25	New Zealand
Try: Richardson 4' c Con: McLean (1/1)	Report (Rio 2016); Report (World Rugby)	Try: Woodman (3) 2' m, 7' m, 8' m Tui 5' m Manuel 10' m Con: Nathan-Wong (0/5)

Deodoro Stadium, Rio de Janeiro
Referee: Amy Perrett (Australia)

==== Bronze medal match ====
8 August 2016
18:30

(bronze) Canada	33–10	Great Britain
Try: Paquin 3' c Landry (2) 6' c, 16' c Farella 9' m Russell 10' c Con: Landry (4/5)	Report (Rio 2016); Report (World Rugby)	Try: Waterman 4' m Joyce 13' m Con: McLean (0/1); Richardson (0/1)

Deodoro Stadium, Rio de Janeiro
Referee: Amy Perrett (Australia)

==== Gold medal match ====
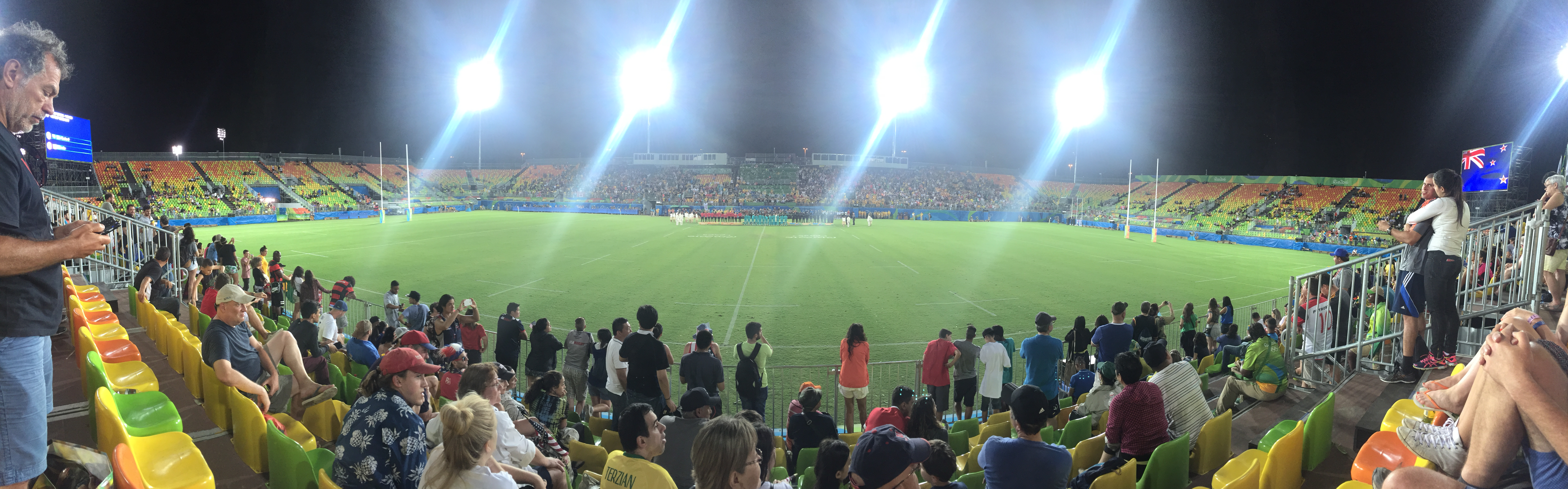
Team's line up before the final

8 August 2016
19:00

(gold) Australia	24–17	New Zealand (silver)
Try: Tonegato 7' m Pelite 10' m Green 12' c Caslick 15' c Con: Dalton (2/4)	Report 1 Report 2	Try: McAlister (2) 4' m, 18' m Woodman 20' c Con: Nathan-Wong (1/3)

Deodoro Stadium, Rio de Janeiro
Referee: Alhambra Nievas (Spain)

Team details

Australia
New Zealand

F	1	Shannon Parry
F	2	Sharni Williams (c)
F	8	Charlotte Caslick
B	7	Charlotte Caslick
B	11	Emilee Cherry
B	10	Alicia Quirk
B	5	Emma Tonegato
Head Coach:
(Australia) Tim Walsh

F	5	Sarah Goss (c)
F	9	Huriana Manuel
F	1	Ruby Tui
B	8	Tyla Nathan-Wong
B	12	Kayla McAlister
B	7	Tyla Nathan-Wong
B	11	Portia Woodman
Head Coach:
(New Zealand) Sean Horan

== Final ranking ==
Rank	Team	Matches	Points	Avg points	Tries	Avg tries
1st place, gold medalist(s)	Australia	6	166	27.67	28	4.67
2nd place, silver medalist(s)	New Zealand	6	156	26.00	26	4.33
3rd place, bronze medalist(s)	Canada	6	136	22.67	22	3.67
4	Great Britain	6	134	22.33	22	3.67
5	United States	6	98	16.33	16	2.67
6	France	6	105	17.50	17	2.83
7	Spain	6	64	10.67	10	1.67
8	Fiji	6	62	7.75	10	1.67
9	Brazil	5	86	17.20	13	2.60
10	Japan	5	39	7.80	7	1.40
11	Kenya	5	39	7.80	7	1.40
12	Colombia	5	10	2.00	2	0.40

== Statistics ==
=== Try scorers ===
10 tries

- (New Zealand) Portia Woodman

7 tries

- (Australia) Charlotte Caslick
- (Australia) Emma Tonegato
- (New Zealand) Kayla McAlister

6 tries

- (Canada) Bianca Farella

5 tries

- (Canada) Ghislaine Landry
- (France) Lina Guérin
- (United States) Alev Kelter

4 tries

- (Brazil) Beatriz Futuro Muhlbauer
- (United Kingdom) Alice Richardson
- (United States) Jessica Javelet

3 tries

- (Australia) Emilee Cherry
- (Australia) Ellia Green
- (Canada) Kayla Moleschi
- (Canada) Karen Paquin
- (France) Camille Grassineau
- (France) Caroline Ladagnous
- (Japan) Marie Yamaguchi
- (Kenya) Janet Musindalo Okelo
- (New Zealand) Huriana Manuel

2 tries

- (Australia) Nicole Beck
- (Australia) Chloe Dalton
- (Brazil) Paula Ishibashi
- (Brazil) Cláudia Teles
- (Fiji) Raijieli Daveua
- (France) Jade Le Pesq
- (United Kingdom) Abbie Brown
- (United Kingdom) Natasha Hunt
- (United Kingdom) Jasmine Joyce
- (United Kingdom) Emily Scarratt
- (United Kingdom) Emily Scott
- (United Kingdom) Danielle Waterman
- (United Kingdom) Joanne Watmore
- (United Kingdom) Amy Wilson-Hardy
- (Japan) Ano Kuwai
- (Kenya) Celestine Navalayo Masinde
- (Spain) Marina Bravo
- (Spain) Amaia Erbina
- (Spain) Iera Etxebarría
- (Spain) Patricia García
- (United States) Joanne Fa'avesi
- (United States) Kathryn Johnson

1 try

- (Australia) Shannon Parry
- (Australia) Evania Pelite
- (Australia) Amy Turner
- (Australia) Sharni Williams
- (Brazil) Amanda Araújo
- (Brazil) Luiza Campos
- (Brazil) Isadora Cerullo
- (Brazil) Mariana Barbosa Ramalho
- (Brazil) Haline Scatrut
- (Canada) Brittany Benn
- (Canada) Jen Kish
- (Canada) Kelly Russell
- (Canada) Natasha Watcham-Roy
- (Canada) Charity Williams
- (Colombia) Sharon Acevedo
- (Colombia) Khaterinne Medina
- (Fiji) Rusila Nagasau
- (Fiji) Litia Naiqato
- (Fiji) Timaima Ravisa
- (Fiji) Viniana Riwai
- (Fiji) Ana Maria Roqica
- (Fiji) Rebecca Tavo
- (Fiji) Lavenia Tinai
- (Fiji) Luisa Tisolo
- (France) Audrey Amiel
- (France) Fanny Horta
- (France) Elodie Guiglion
- (France) Marjorie Mayans
- (United Kingdom) Heather Fisher
- (United Kingdom) Katy McLean
- (Japan) Yuka Kanematsu
- (Japan) Yume Okuroda
- (Kenya) Doreen Remour Nziwa
- (Kenya) Irene Awino Otieno
- (New Zealand) Kelly Brazier
- (New Zealand) Gayle Broughton
- (New Zealand) Theresa Fitzpatrick
- (New Zealand) Tyla Nathan-Wong
- (New Zealand) Ruby Tui
- (New Zealand) Niall Williams
- (Spain) María Casado
- (Spain) Bárbara Pla
- (United States) Ryan Carlyle
- (United States) Lauren Doyle
- (United States) Richelle Stephens

=== Point scorers ===
50 points

- (New Zealand) Portia Woodman

41 points

- (Canada) Ghislaine Landry

35 points

- (Australia) Charlotte Caslick
- (Australia) Emma Tonegato
- (New Zealand) Kayla McAlister

34 points

- (Australia) Chloe Dalton

33 points

- (United States) Alev Kelter

30 points

- (Canada) Bianca Farella

29 points

- (New Zealand) Tyla Nathan-Wong

28 points

- (United Kingdom) Alice Richardson

25 points

- (France) Lina Guérin

24 points

- (Spain) Patricia García

20 points

- (Brazil) Beatriz Futuro Muhlbauer
- (France) Jade Le Pesq
- (United States) Jessica Javelet

19 points

- (Brazil) Raquel Kochhann

17 points

- (United Kingdom) Katy McLean

15 points

- (Australia) Emilee Cherry
- (Australia) Ellia Green
- (Canada) Kayla Moleschi
- (Canada) Kelly Russell
- (Canada) Karen Paquin
- (France) Camille Grassineau
- (France) Caroline Ladagnous
- (Japan) Marie Yamaguchi
- (Kenya) Janet Musindalo Okelo
- (New Zealand) Huriana Manuel

14 points

- (United Kingdom) Emily Scott

13 points

- (Fiji) Lavenia Tinai

10 points

- (Australia) Nicole Beck
- (Brazil) Paula Ishibashi
- (Brazil) Cláudia Teles
- (Fiji) Raijieli Daveua
- (France) Pauline Biscarat
- (United Kingdom) Abbie Brown
- (United Kingdom) Natasha Hunt
- (United Kingdom) Jasmine Joyce
- (United Kingdom) Emily Scarratt
- (United Kingdom) Danielle Waterman
- (United Kingdom) Joanne Watmore
- (United Kingdom) Amy Wilson-Hardy
- (Japan) Ano Kuwai
- (Kenya) Celestine Navalayo Masinde
- (Spain) Marina Bravo
- (Spain) Amaia Erbina
- (Spain) Iera Etxebarría
- (United States) Joanne Fa'avesi
- (United States) Kathryn Johnson

8 points

- (United States) Bui Baravilala

7 points

- (Fiji) Luisa Tisolo
- (Fiji) Viniana Riwai
- (Japan) Yume Okuroda
- (New Zealand) Kelly Brazier
- (United States) Richelle Stephens

5 points

- (Australia) Shannon Parry
- (Australia) Evania Pelite
- (Australia) Amy Turner
- (Australia) Sharni Williams
- (Brazil) Amanda Araújo
- (Brazil) Luiza Campos
- (Brazil) Isadora Cerullo
- (Brazil) Mariana Barbosa Ramalho
- (Brazil) Haline Scatrut
- (Canada) Brittany Benn
- (Canada) Jen Kish
- (Canada) Natasha Watcham-Roy
- (Canada) Charity Williams
- (Colombia) Sharon Acevedo
- (Colombia) Khaterinne Medina
- (Fiji) Rusila Nagasau
- (Fiji) Litia Naiqato
- (Fiji) Timaima Ravisa
- (Fiji) Ana Maria Roqica
- (Fiji) Rebecca Tavo
- (France) Audrey Amiel
- (France) Fanny Horta
- (France) Elodie Guiglion
- (France) Marjorie Mayans
- (United Kingdom) Heather Fisher
- (Japan) Yuka Kanematsu
- (Kenya) Doreen Remour Nziwa
- (Kenya) Irene Awino Otieno
- (New Zealand) Gayle Broughton
- (New Zealand) Theresa Fitzpatrick
- (New Zealand) Ruby Tui
- (New Zealand) Niall Williams
- (Spain) María Casado
- (Spain) Bárbara Pla
- (United States) Ryan Carlyle
- (United States) Lauren Doyle

4 points

- (Kenya) Janet Awuor Awino

2 points

- (Australia) Gemma Etheridge
- (Brazil) Tais Balconi
- (Japan) Mio Yamanaka

== See also ==
- Rugby sevens at the 2016 Summer Olympics – Men's tournament
