= 2013 Rugby World Cup Sevens squads – Women =

The rosters of all participating teams at the women's tournament of the 2013 Rugby World Cup Sevens.

== Pool A ==
=== Canada ===
Coach: (Canada) John Tait

1. Ghislaine Landry
2. Kayla Moleschi
3. Karen Paquin
4. Kelly Russell
5. Ashley Steacy
6. Mandy Marchak
7. Jen Kish (c)
8. Arielle Dubissette-Borrice
9. Bianca Farella
10. Heather Moyse
11. Magali Harvey
12. Brittany Waters

=== Netherlands ===
Coach: Gareth Gilbert

1. Joyce van Altena
2. Linda Franssen (c)
3. Inge Petra Visser
4. Pien Selbeck
5. Loraine Laros
6. Bente Gelauff
7. Kelly van Harskamp
8. Anne Hielckert
9. Johanna van Rossum
10. Paula Schouten
11. Nicole Kwee
12. Dorien Eppink

=== New Zealand ===
Coach: (New Zealand) Sean Horan

1. Linda Itunu
2. Honey Hireme
3. Vaine Greig
4. Alexis Tapsell
5. Sarah Goss
6. Renee Wickcliffe
7. Tyla Nathan-Wong
8. Kelly Brazier
9. Huriana Manuel (c)
10. Selica Winiata
11. Portia Woodman
12. Kayla McAlister

=== Tunisia ===
1. Khouloud Gmir
2. Rin el Haj Ali
3. Ikhlas Abida
4. Rawia Othmani
5. Rihab Zorgati
6. Donia Charfi
7. Saoussen Dellagi
8. Dorsaf Mahbouli
9. Mariem Mekni
10. Ines Souissi
11. Ameni Gharbi
12. Dhekra Khemili

== Pool B ==
=== Australia ===
1. Shannon Parry
2. Sharni Williams (c)
3. Shontelle Stowers
4. Saofaiga Saemo
5. Nikki Etheridge
6. Katrina Barker
7. Tiana Penitani
8. Iliseva Batibasaga
9. Amy Turner
10. Rebecca Tavo
11. Emilee Cherry
12. Charlotte Caslick

=== China ===
1. Sun Tingting
2. Yao Jiyan
3. Liu Tang
4. Fan Wenjuan
5. Chen Ming
6. Liu Yan (c)
7. Zhao Xinqi
8. Ma Guoping
9. Gong Guye
10. Li Yuanyuan
11. Tong Xueqin
12. Chen Keyi

=== Ireland ===
Coach: (Ireland) Jon Skurr

1. Jenny Murphy
2. Claire Molloy
3. Sophie Spence
4. Jeanette Feighery
5. Larissa Muldoon
6. Lynne Cantwell
7. Alison Miller
8. Shannon Houston (c)
9. Amy Davis
10. Ashleigh Baxter
11. Laura O'Mahony
12. Nikki Caughey

=== South Africa ===
Coach: (South Africa) Denver Wannies

1. Mandisa Williams (c)
2. Benele Makwezela
3. Nomaphelo Mayongo
4. Zenay Jordaan
5. Yolanda Meiring
6. Lorinda Brown
7. Phumeza Gadu
8. Thami Faleni
9. Fundiswa Plaatjie
10. Mathrin Simmers
11. Natasha Hofmeester
12. Veroeshka Grain

== Pool C ==
=== Brazil ===
1. Juliana Esteves dos Santos
2. Beatriz Futuro Muhlbauer
3. Julia Albino Sarda
4. Edna Santini
5. Paula Ishibashi
6. Tais Balconi
7. Thais Rocha Cruz
8. Angelica Gevaerd (c)
9. Luiza Campos
10. Maria Gabriela Avila
11. Carla Neme Barbosa
12. Mariana Barbosa Ramalho

=== Fiji ===
1. Elina Ratauluva
2. Siteri Drova Tabua
3. Litia Naiqato
4. Esiteri Rauca Bulikiobo
5. Viniana Naisaluwaki Riwai
6. Asinate Ufia Savu
7. Rusila Nagasau (c)
8. Talica Vodo
9. Tavaita Rowati
10. Suliana Batirau Gusuivalu
11. Priscilla Sauvavi Siata
12. Luisa Tisolo

=== Spain ===
Coach: Boris Gutierrez

1. Berta García
2. Paula Medín
3. Ángela del Pan
4. Marina Bravo
5. Patricia García
6. Marta Cabane
7. Bárbara Plà
8. Irene Schiavon
9. Elisabet Martínez
10. Vanessa Rial (c)
11. María Casado
12. María Ribera

=== United States ===
Coach: (Canada) Ric Suggitt

1. Jillion Potter
2. Kelly Griffin
3. Vanesha McGee (c)
4. Deven Owsiany
5. Kimber Rozier
6. Christy Ringgenberg
7. Victoria Folayan
8. Kathryn Johnson
9. Irene Gardner
10. Emilie Bydwell
11. Nathalie Marchino
12. Ryan Carlyle

== Pool D ==
=== England ===
Coach: (England) Barry Maddocks

1. Claire Allan
2. Heather Fisher
3. Katherine Merchant
4. Natasha Hunt
5. Rachael Burford
6. Katy McLean
7. Emily Scarratt
8. Marlie Packer
9. Fran Matthews
10. Alice Richardson
11. Michaela Staniford (c)
12. Joanne Watmore

=== France ===
1. Marjorie Mayans
2. Camille Grassineau
3. Koumiba Djossouvi
4. Pauline Biscarat
5. Laura Delas
6. Fanny Horta (c)
7. Caroline Ladagnous
8. Anaïs Lagougine
9. Jade Le Pesq
10. Chloe Pelle
11. Christelle Le Duff
12. Shannon Izar

=== Japan ===
1. Chiharu Nakamura (c)
2. Ayaka Suzuki
3. Misaki Suzuki
4. Kana Mitsugi
5. Akari Fujisaki
6. Makiko Tomita
7. Noriko Taniguchi
8. Yume Okuroda
9. Yoko Suzuki
10. Chisato Yokoo
11. Marie Yamaguchi
12. Chikami Inoue

=== Russia ===
1. Rusiet Edidzhi
2. Anna Prib
3. Ekatarina Kabeeva
4. Svetlana Usatykh
5. Baizat Khamidova
6. Anna Malygina
7. Marina Petrova
8. Maria Titova
9. Nadezda Kudinova (c)
10. Ekaterina Kazakova
11. Anastasiya Mukharyamova
12. Ekaterina Bankerova
