= Rugby sevens at the 2018 Commonwealth Games – Women's tournament =

Rugby tournament

2018 Women's Commonwealth Rugby Sevens Tournament
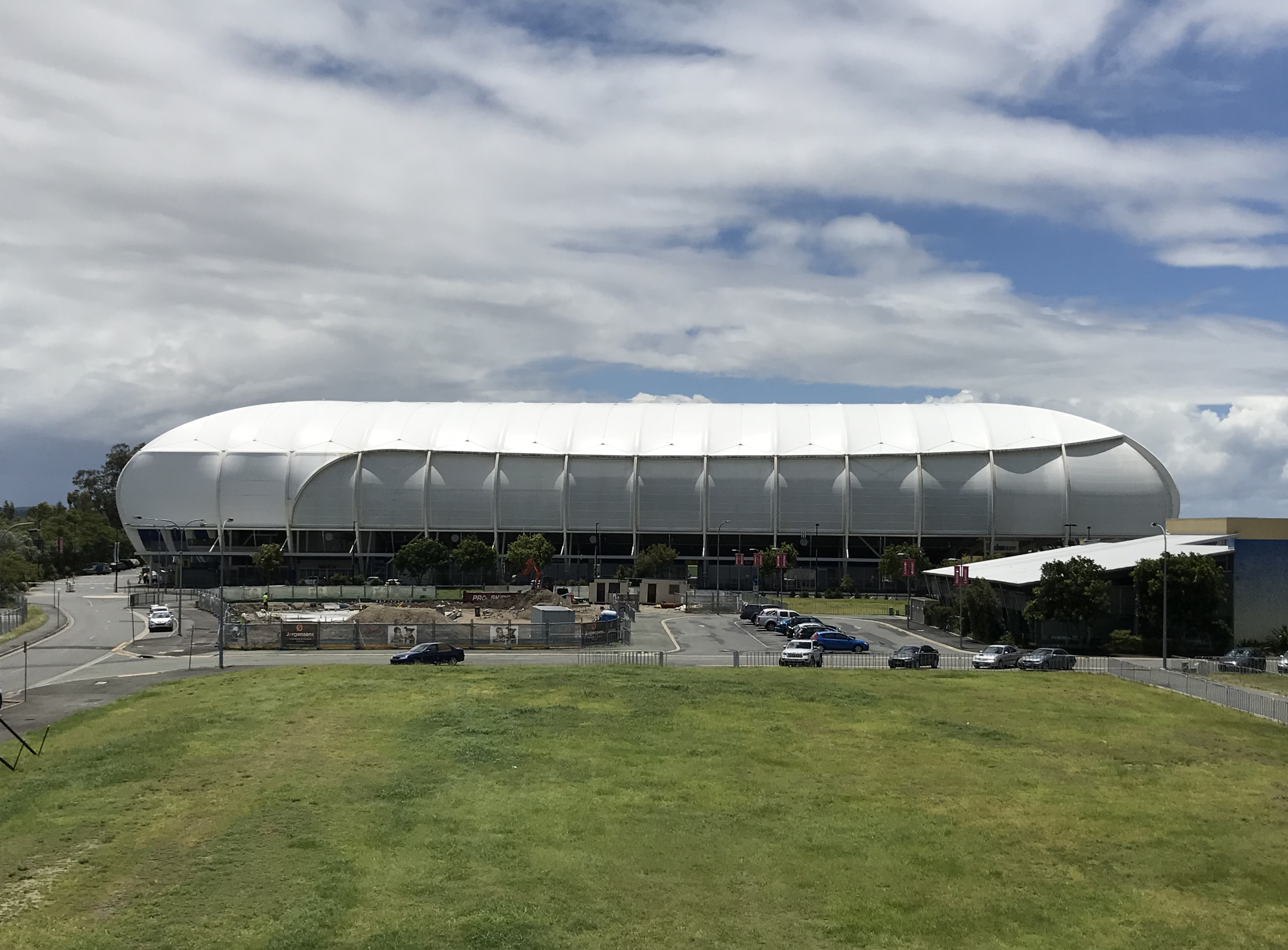
- View of the Robina Stadium, where the Rugby Sevens tournament took place

Tournament details
- Host: Australia
- Venue: Robina Stadium
- Date: 13–15 April 2018
- Teams: 8

Final positions
- Champions: New Zealand (1st title)
- Runner-up: Australia
- Third place: England
- Fourth place: Canada

Tournament statistics
- Matches played: 20

The women's rugby sevens tournament at the 2018 Commonwealth Games was the first time that women's teams had participated in this event. The venue for the competition was Robina Stadium.

== Background ==
=== Pool stage ===
Wales qualified on 9 July 2017 after placing fifth at the 2017 Rugby Europe Women's Sevens Grand Prix Series.

The pools were confirmed on 2 February 2018, scheduling was announced on 23 February 2018.

== Participating nations ==
| Event | Date | Location | Teams | Qualified |
|---|---|---|---|---|
| Host Nation | 11 November 2011 | Basseterre, Saint Kitts | 1 | Australia |
| 2016–17 World Rugby Women's Sevens Series | 1 Dec 2016 – 25 June 2017 | Various | 4 | New Zealand; Canada; Fiji; England |
| 2017 Women's Africa Cup Sevens | 16 – 17 September 2017 | Monastir, Tunisia | 2 | South Africa; Kenya |
| 2017 Rugby Europe Women's Sevens Grand Prix Series | 17 June – 9 July 2017 | Various | 1 | Wales |
| Total | | | 8 | |

== Competition schedule ==
The following is the competition schedule for the Women’s Rugby sevens competition:

| P | Pool stage | CM | Classification matches | ½ | Semi-finals | B | Bronze Medal Match | F | Gold Medal Match |

| Event↓/Date → | Fri 13 | Sat 14 | | Sun 15 | | | | |
| Event | E | M | E | M | | | | |
|---|---|---|---|---|---|---|---|---|
| Women | P | | | CM | ½ | CM | B | F |

== Pool stage ==
In pool play, each team plays one match against the other three teams in the group.

The top two teams in each pool advance to the semi-finals and the remaining teams advance to the lower classification matches (for places 5 to 8).

=== Pool A ===
| Pos | Team | Pld | W | D | L | PF | PA | PD | Pts | Qualification |
|---|---|---|---|---|---|---|---|---|---|---|
| 1 | New Zealand | 3 | 3 | 0 | 0 | 110 | 7 | +103 | 9 | Semi-finals |
| 2 | Canada | 3 | 2 | 0 | 1 | 60 | 36 | +24 | 7 | Semi-finals |
| 3 | Kenya | 3 | 1 | 0 | 2 | 31 | 79 | −48 | 5 | Classification semi-finals |
| 4 | South Africa | 3 | 0 | 0 | 3 | 10 | 89 | −79 | 3 | Classification semi-finals |

Source: GC2018
Rules for classification: 1) Points; 2) Head-to-head result; 3) Point difference; 4) Points scored.

13 April 2018
16:31

| Canada | 29–0 | South Africa |
| Try: Crossley 1' m Benn 2' c Kaljuvee 4' c Williams 6' m Darling 8' m Con: Landry (2/4) 3', 4'; Lukan (0/1) | (Gold Coast 2018) |

Robina Stadium, Gold Coast
Referee: Hollie Davidson (Scotland)

13 April 2018
16:53

| New Zealand | 45–0 | Kenya |
| Try: Woodman (3) 1' m, 8' c, 9' c Brazier 2' c Broughton 7' c Williams (2) 11' c, 14' m Con: Nathan-Wong (5/6) 3', 7', 8', 9', 11'; Willison (0/1) | (Gold Coast 2018) |

Robina Stadium, Gold Coast
Referee: Rose LaBreche (Canada)

13 April 2018
19:11

| Canada | 24–12 | Kenya |
| Try: Greenshields 1' m Darling 3' m Farella (2) 6' c, 8' c Con: Nicholas (2/4) 6', 8' | (Gold Goast 2018) | Try: Olando 5' c Okelo 12'; Con: Remour Nziwa (1/1) 5' |

Robina Stadium, Gold Coast
Referee: Hollie Davidson (Scotland)

13 April 2018
19:33

| New Zealand | 41–0 | South Africa |
| Try: Goss 1' c Woodman (2) 1' m, 8' c Blyde 6' m Broughton 7' m Williams 9' c Brazier 12' m Con: Nathan-Wong (3/6) 1', 8', 9'; Willison (0/1) | (Gold Coast 2018) |

Robina Stadium, Gold Coast
Referee: Sara Cox (England)

14 April 2018
12:27

| South Africa | 10–19 | Kenya |
| Try: Simmers 8' m Jordaan 9' m Con: Jordaan (0/2) | (Gold Coast 2018) | Try: Okelo 2' c Masinde 7' c Olando 13' m Con: Okulu (2/3) 3', 7' |

Robina Stadium, Gold Coast
Referee: Rebecca Mahoney (New Zealand)

14 April 2018
12:49

| New Zealand | 24–7 | Canada |
| Try: Woodman 2' m Blyde (2) 9' m, 12' c Waaka 14' c Con: Nathan-Wong (2/4) 12', 14'; Cards: Goss (yellow card) 6' to 8'; Blyde (yellow card) 7' to 9' | (Gold Coast 2018) | Try: Greenshields 7' c Con: Landry (1/1) 7' |

Robina Stadium, Gold Coast
Referee: Alhambra Nievas (Spain)

=== Pool B ===
| Pos | Team | Pld | W | D | L | PF | PA | PD | Pts | Qualification |
|---|---|---|---|---|---|---|---|---|---|---|
| 1 | Australia | 3 | 3 | 0 | 0 | 80 | 27 | +53 | 9 | Semi-finals |
| 2 | England | 3 | 2 | 0 | 1 | 74 | 34 | +40 | 7 | Semi-finals |
| 3 | Fiji | 3 | 1 | 0 | 2 | 44 | 41 | +3 | 5 | Classification semi-finals |
| 4 | Wales | 3 | 0 | 0 | 3 | 12 | 108 | −96 | 3 | Classification semi-finals |

Source: GC2018
Rules for classification: 1) Points; 2) Head-to-head result; 3) Point difference; 4) Points scored.

13 April 2018
17:15

| Fiji | 5–17 | England |
| Try: Ravisa 6' m Con: Nagasau (0/1) | (Gold Coast 2018) | Try: Fleming 1' m Scarratt 11' c Thompson 13' m Con: Hunt (1/3) 11' |

Robina Stadium, Gold Coast
Referee: Aimee Barrett-Theron (South Africa)

13 April 2018
17:37

| Australia | 34–5 | Wales |
| Try: Tonegato 1' m Pelite 2' c Green (2) 6' m, 8' m Williams 7' m du Toit 12' c Con: Sykes (2/6) 3', 13' | (Gold Coast 2018) | Try: Joyce 10' m Con: Snowsill (0/1) |

Robina Stadium, Gold Coast
Referee: Rebecca Mahoney (New Zealand)

13 April 2018
19:55

| Fiji | 29–7 | Wales |
| Try: Tinai (3) 1' c, 5' c, 8' m Riwai 3' m Naimasi 10' m Con: Tinai (2/4) 1', 5'; Riwai (0/1) | (Gold Coast 2018) | Try: Joyce 13' c Con: Packer (1/1) 13' |

Robina Stadium, Gold Coast
Referee: Rose LaBreche (Canada)

13 April 2018
20:17

| Australia | 29–12 | England |
| Try: Tonegato 2' m Green 7' c Sykes 8' m Pelite 12' c Staples 14' m Con: Sykes (2/5) 7', 12' | (Gold Coast 2018) | Try: Brown 4' m Fleming 6' c Con: Hunt (1/2) 6' |

Robina Stadium, Gold Coast
Referee: Alhambra Nievas (Spain)

13 April 2018
18:59

| England | 45–0 | Wales |
| Try: Fleming 1' c Hunt (2) 2' c, 6' m Scarratt 4' c Scott 8' c Wilson-Hardy (2) 9' m, 14' c Con: Hunt (3/5) 1', 2', 4'; Scott (2/2) 8', 14' | (Gold Coast 2018) | Cards: Powell Hughes (yellow card) 12' to 14' |

Robina Stadium, Gold Coast
Referee: Aimee Barrett-Theron (South Africa)

13 April 2018
19:21

| Australia | 17–10 | Fiji |
| Try: Tonegato 1' m Caslick (2) 8' m, 13' c Con: Sykes (1/2) 13'; Cherry (0/1) | (Gold Coast 2018) | Try: Naiobasali (2) 2' m, 9' m Con: Tinai (0/1); Nagasau (0/1); Cards: Siata (yellow card) 11' to 13' |

Robina Stadium, Gold Coast
Referee: Sara Cox (England)

== Knockout stage ==
=== Lower classification round ===
Classification Semi-finals
15 April 2018 – Robina Stadium
Fiji | 40
South Africa | 12
15 April 2018 – Robina Stadium
Kenya | 14
Wales | 12

Match for 5th Place
15 April 2018 – Robina Stadium
Fiji | 40
Kenya | 5
Match for 7th Place
15 April 2018 – Robina Stadium
South Africa | 14
Wales | 19

Matches

Classification semi-finals

| 15 April 2018 | Fiji | 40–12 | South Africa | Gold Coast |
| 9:31 |

| 15 April 2018 | Kenya | 14–12 | Wales | Gold Coast |
| 9:53 |

Match for 7th Place

| 15 April 2018 | South Africa | 14–19 | Wales | Gold Coast |
| 12:27 |

Match for 5th Place

| 15 April 2018 | Fiji | 40–5 | Kenya | Gold Coast |
| 12:49 |

=== Medal round ===
Semi-finals
15 April 2018 – Robina Stadium
Australia | 33
Canada | 7
15 April 2018 – Robina Stadium
New Zealand | 26
England | 5

Gold medal match
15 April 2018 – Robina Stadium
Australia | 12
New Zealand (e) | 17
Bronze medal match
15 April 2018 – Robina Stadium
Canada | 19
England | 24

Matches

Semi-finals

| 15 April 2018 | Australia | 33–7 | Canada | Gold Coast |
| 10:59 |

| 15 April 2018 | New Zealand | 26–5 | England | Gold Coast |
| 11:21 |

Bronze medal match

| 15 April 2018 | Canada | 19–24 | England | Gold Coast |
| 13:55 |

Gold medal match

| 15 April 2018 | Australia | 12–17 (a.e.t.) | New Zealand | Gold Coast |
| 14:42 |

== Final standing ==
| Rank | Team |
|---|---|
| 1st place, gold medalist(s) | New Zealand |
| 2nd place, silver medalist(s) | Australia |
| 3rd place, bronze medalist(s) | England |
| 4 | Canada |
| 5 | Fiji |
| 6 | Kenya |
| 7 | Wales |
| 8 | South Africa |
