= Isadora Cerullo =

Brazilian-American rugby sevens player

- Born: 24 March 1991 (age 35) Summit, New Jersey, U.S.
- Height: 1.58 m (5 ft 2 in)
- Weight: 60 kg (132 lb)
- School: William G. Enloe High School
- University: Columbia University

Rugby union career
National sevens team
Years	Team	Comps
2014–present	Brazil	
Medal record
Women's rugby sevens
Representing Brazil
Pan American Games
Bronze medal – third place	2015 Toronto	Team competition
South American Games
Gold medal – first place	2018 Cochabamba	Team competition

Isadora "Izzy" Cerullo (born 24 March 1991) is a Brazilian-American rugby sevens player.

== Early life and education ==
Cerullo was raised in Raleigh, North Carolina. Her parents immigrated to the United States from Brazil in the last years of the country's military dictatorship which lasted from 1964 to 1985. She is one of four children and a triplet, with two brothers the same age and one older brother. She is a dual citizen of the United States and Brazil. Cerullo graduated in 2009 from William G. Enloe High School, where she was a member of the varsity soccer and cross-country teams. She went on to attend Columbia University to study medicine and was a member of the rugby team and a writer for the Columbia Daily Spectator, graduating in 2013. While a student at Columbia, she worked as an emergency medical technician.

== Career ==
Cerullo was recruited to play internationally while a member of Philadelphia Women's Rugby Football Club. Cerullo moved to São Paulo to play rugby professionally. She won a bronze medal at the 2015 Pan American Games as a member of the Brazil women's national rugby sevens team. She was selected for the Brazil women's rugby sevens team to compete in the 2016 Summer Olympics in Rio de Janeiro. Brazil's women's rugby team placed ninth at the 2016 Olympics.

== Personal life ==
Following the final of the women's rugby sevens at the 2016 Summer Olympics Cerullo's partner of two years, Marjorie Yuri Enya, walked onto the field at Deodoro Stadium and publicly asked Cerullo to marry her. The proposal was widely reported in the media, with Cerullo being the first athlete to accept a marriage proposal at the Olympics. The couple currently lives in São Paulo. Cerullo is a feminist.
