= Kelly Brazier =

New Zealand rugby union player (born 1989)

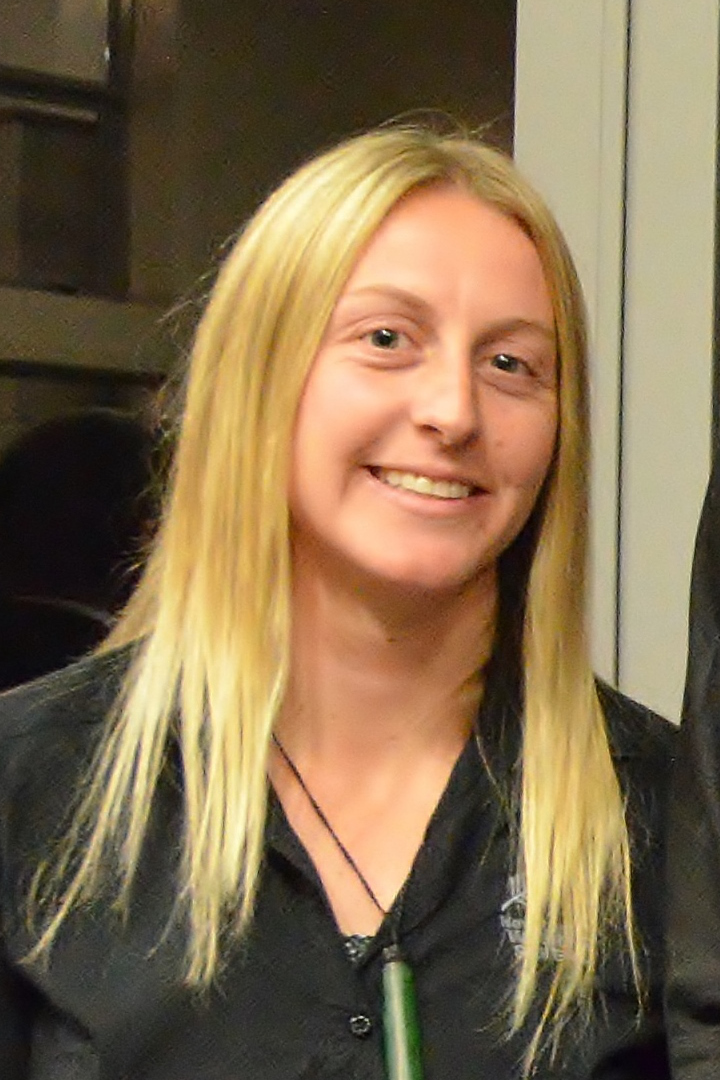
- Brazier in 2016
- Born: 28 October 1989 (age 37) Dunedin, Otago, New Zealand
- Height: 170 cm (5 ft 7 in)
- Weight: 70 kg (154 lb)
- School: Otago Girls' High School; Otago Polytechnic
- Occupation: Professional rugby player

Rugby union career
- Position(s): Second five-eighth, First five-eighth
Amateur team(s)
Years	Team	Apps	(Points)
2003–2010	Alhambra Union		(0)
2011–	Clanswomen		(0)
Provincial / State sides
Years	Team	Apps	(Points)
2007–2009, 2012–2016	Otago	22	(162)
2011	Canterbury	5	(67)
2020, 2024	Bay of Plenty	8	(64)
- Correct as of 19 June 2026
Super Rugby
Years	Team	Apps	(Points)
2022, 2025	Chiefs Manawa	7	(29)
- Correct as of 19 June 2026
International career
Years	Team	Apps	(Points)
2009–25	New Zealand	44	(190)
- Correct as of 19 June 2026
National sevens team
Years	Team		Comps
2013–25	New Zealand		224 apps
Coaching career
- Years: Team
- 2023: Brave Louve (7s)
Medal record
Representing New Zealand
Women's rugby union
Women's Rugby World Cup
Gold medal – first place	2010 England	Team competition
Gold medal – first place	2017 Ireland	Team competition
Bronze medal – third place	2025 England	Team competition
Women's rugby sevens
Olympic Games
Silver medal – second place	2016 Rio de Janeiro	Team competition
Gold medal – first place	2020 Tokyo	Team competition
Commonwealth Games
Gold medal – first place	2018 Gold Coast	Team competition
Bronze medal – third place	2022 Birmingham	Team competition
Rugby World Cup Sevens
Gold medal – first place	2013 Moscow	Team competition
Gold medal – first place	2018 San Francisco	Team competition
Silver medal – second place	2022 Cape Town	Team competition

Kelly Brazier (born 28 October 1989) is a New Zealand rugby union coach and former player. She has played flyhalf, centre and fullback for the Black Ferns, New Zealand's women's national rugby team, and has competed at four Rugby World Cups in 2010, 2014, 2017 and 2025. She has represented Otago, Canterbury and the Bay of Plenty in the Farah Palmer Cup.

Brazier has also represented the Black Ferns sevens team in the Olympic Games, the Rugby World Cup Sevens, the Women's Sevens Series, and the Commonwealth Games. She has won gold medals in every major sevens tournaments. Brazier was the first player, of either sex, to have won two sevens World Cups and two fifteen=a-side World Cups.

== Early career ==
Brazier was born in Dunedin to an English father and an Irish mother who came to New Zealand with their first child Tony. Her sport career started at five when her two-years-older brother took her to a rugby field, and was split between touch in summer and rugby during winter.

Brazier was in New Zealand's U21 mixed touch team at 14 and in New Zealand secondary schoolgirls team at 15. She also began to play in Alhambra Union rugby in 2003 and Otago Spirit provincial selection in 2004. She entered New Zealand rugby's record books on 2 May 2009, when she scored 64 points – ten tries and seven conversions – for her club in the Otago Metropolitan Women's Premier match against Kaikorai at the University Oval in Dunedin.

== Rugby career ==
=== 2009–10 ===
Brazier made her international debut against England on 14 November 2009 at Pillar Data Arena, in Esher, when Black Ferns won 16–3. In the second test match played at Twickenham in front of a record crowd of 12500 people Black Ferns was defeated 10–3.

Brazier was among the nominees for the 2009 Steinlager Rugby Awards for NZRU Women's Player of the Year with Carla Hohepa and Victoria Heighway, who won. She was also named the Otago Institute of Sport and Adventure's top sportsperson in 2009 and 2010.

Brazier took part in the 2010 Women's Rugby World Cup, playing a key role in the Black Ferns' success in the final against England and becoming the leading point scorer with 4 tries, 11 conversions and 2 penalties. She scored her first try during the match against South Africa thanks to a fine pass by Anna Richards.

=== 2011 ===
After going to coach and play for Clan Rugby in Edmonton, Canada for four months, Brazier went back to New Zealand for the start of Women's NPC with Canterbury. In spite of a good debut with her new team – two tries in a 60–0 win over Hawke's Bay Tuis – and some other victories against Manawatu Cyclones and her former team Otago Spirit, Canterbury failed to reach the final.

In October 2011, she was called by New Zealand head coach Grant Hansen to play three tests against England, a tour which concluded with two losses and a draw for Black Ferns and only 5 points for her (a conversion and a penalty).

=== 2017–19 ===
Brazier was named in the squad for the 2017 Women's Rugby World Cup. At the 2018 Commonwealth Games, Brazier was scored the winning try in the grand final against Australia, running 80 metres and securing gold for New Zealand. In 2019, she was part of the winning team of the Women's Super Rugby Series.

=== 2022 ===
Brazier was named in the Black Ferns Sevens squad for the 2022 Commonwealth Games in Birmingham. She won a bronze medal at the Commonwealth Games. She later won a silver medal in her third Rugby World Cup Sevens in Cape Town.

=== 2022–23 ===
Brazier played for New Zealand in the 2022–23 Women's Sevens Series.

=== 2023–24 ===
Returning to the New Zealand team for the 2023–24 season Brazier scored her one hundredth try in the team's quarter-final win over Brazil in the Dubai tournament on 2–3 December 2023.

An severe ongoing Achilles injury in 2024 meant that she was unavailable for selection for the New Zealand sevens team for the 2024 Paris Olympics.

=== 2024–25 ===
Brazier was selected for the New Zealand team to play in the first two tournaments of the 2024-2025 Sevens season.

At the second tournament of the season held in Cape Town on 7–8 December 2024 she celebrated playing in her 50th tournament of the Sevens series.

In July 2025, she was named in the Black Ferns squad to the Women's Rugby World Cup. Her appearance in England meant that she became only the second woman to play in four World Cups.

== Retirement ==
In February 2026, after 18 years of playing for New Zealand, Brazier announced her retirement from playing rugby.

== Coaching ==
Brazier had long expressed a desire to transition to coaching.

In 2023 Brazier was granted an eight-week sabbatical so that after the 2022-23 World Sevens Series finale in Toulouse, she could be an assistant coach with the Brave Louve Club in Japan between May and July for the Taiyo Seimei Women's Sevens competition. Her role as ‘spot coach’ included working on the game plan and player skills. Her family accompanied her to Japan.

In 2025 she was an assistant coach at the Global Youth Sevens and later with the New Zealand Development Sevens team.

Concurrent with her retirement in 2026 from playing rugby she joined the technical staff of the Chiefs Manawa as assistant coach for the 2026 Super Rugby Aupiki competition.

== Personal life ==
Brazier is openly lesbian and her wife Tahlia gave birth to their first child, a son in 2020. The couple subsequently had a second son.
