= Beatrice Benvenuti =

Italian rugby union referee

- Born: 1993 (age 32–33); Rome, Italy
- Occupation: Rugby referee

Maria Beatrice Benvenuti (born 1993) is an Italian rugby union referee.

Benvenuti has refereed at the 2016 Olympic Games, the Women's Rugby World Cup in 2014 and 2017 and the Women's Six Nations Championship in 2018 and 2019. She has also refereed at the 2018 Women's Rugby World Cup Sevens and at the 2018 USA Women's Sevens.

In December 2016, she was tackled during an Italian League match by Argentinian player Bruno Doglioli. Benvenuti gave the player a yellow card and finished refereeing the match but was later taken to hospital where she was diagnosed with having whiplash. The Italian Rugby Federation also banned Doglioli from playing professional rugby, initially for three years, and then later extended to a lifetime ban.
