= Chloe Dalton =

Australian rugby union player

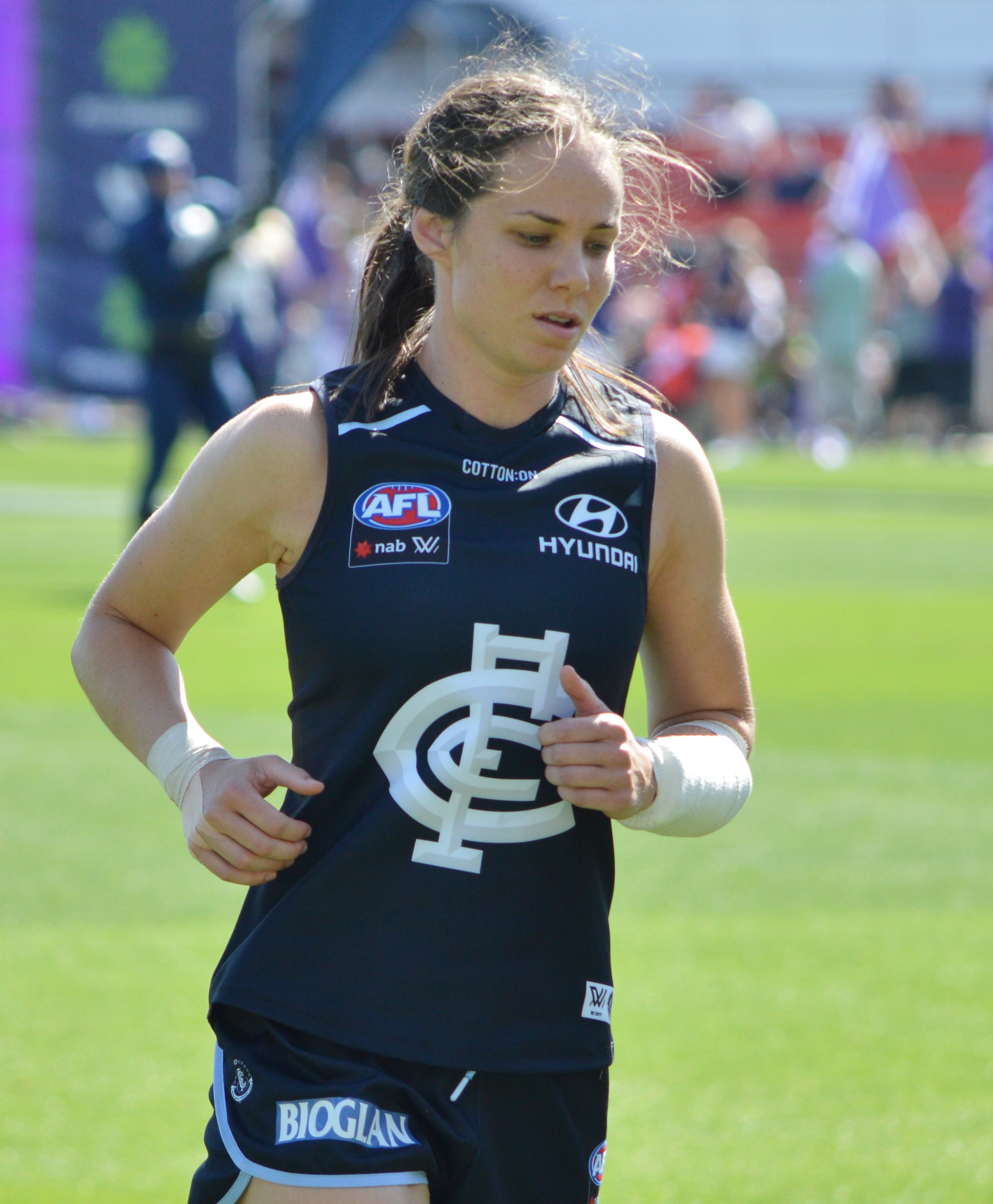
- Dalton playing Australian rules football with Carlton in March 2019
- Born: Chloe Dalton OAM; 11 July 1993 (age 33) Singapore
- Height: 1.80 m (5 ft 11 in)
- Weight: 72 kg (159 lb)

Rugby union career
- Position: Forward
National sevens team
Years	Team	Comps
2014–present	Australia	
Medal record
Women's rugby sevens
Representing Australia
Olympic Games
Gold medal – first place	2016 Rio de Janeiro	Team competition

Chloe Dalton OAM (born 11 July 1993) is an Australian professional Australian rules football, rugby union player and basketballer. She represented Australia in rugby sevens and won a gold medal as a member of Australia's women's sevens team at the 2016 Summer Olympics.

== Early life ==
Chloe Dalton was born in Mount Elizabeth Hospital in Singapore in 1993, to mother Penny and father Brad (president of the Warringah Rugby Club), before moving to Sydney at the age of 3 along with siblings Michael and Bailey (both rugby players with Warringah).

== Basketball ==
Chloe began playing basketball with in the WNBL with the Sydney Uni Flames playing 2 matches (alongside GWS teammate Erin Todd) each season for a career total of 4 matches between 2012 and 2014. In 2014 she left the WNBL with the aim of playing for Australia in rugby 7s at Rio in 2016.

== Rugby union ==
Dalton represented Australia in rugby sevens and made her debut at the 2014 Dubai Women's Sevens. She won a gold medal as a member of Australia's women's sevens team at the 2016 Summer Olympics.

Dalton was part of the Australian squad that won the 2015–16 World Rugby Women's Sevens Series. She is a member of Australia's team at the 2016 Olympics, defeating New Zealand in the final to win the inaugural Olympic gold medal in the sport.

== Australian rules football ==
Dalton, after seeing AFLW on television for the first time, and with virtually no prior contact with the sport, made the decision to switch codes in 2017 with Sevens teammate Brooke Walker. With the aim of playing professionally she moved to Melbourne in early 2018 and chose the Carlton Football Club based on the club environment, quickly earning a spot in the club's VFLW team before being selected as a rookie in the 2018 AFL Women's draft along with Walker. In her first season, the 2019 AFL Women's season she played all matches. She followed this up with finishing runner-Up Best and Fairest Awards for For Carlton in 2020.

Dalton returned to represent Australia in rugby 7s aiming for the Tokyo Olympics, however her campaign ended suffering a fractured cheekbone and signed with AFLW club GWS Giants to return home to Sydney.

== Personal life ==
Dalton is studying at the University of Sydney for a Bachelor of Applied Science degree majoring in Physical therapy. She attended Oxford Falls Grammar School and Pymble Ladies' College.

At the 2017 Australia Day Honours she received the Medal of the Order of Australia for service to sport as a gold medallist at the Rio 2016 Olympic Games.

== Writing ==
In 2023 her first book, Girls ~~Don't~~ Play Sport, was published by Allen & Unwin.

== See also ==
- List of players who have converted from one football code to another
