= Rugby sevens at the 2018 South American Games =

- Venue: Estadio Municipal de Colcapirhua
- Location: Colcapirhua
- Dates: 27–29 May
- Nations: 8
- Teams: 7 (men); 7 (women)

The rugby sevens competition at the 2018 South American Games was held in Colcapirhua, Bolivia from 27 to 29 May at the Estadio Municipal de Colcapirhua.

== Participating teams ==
Men

- Argentina
- Bolivia
- Brazil
- Chile
- Colombia
- Paraguay
- Uruguay

Women

- Argentina
- Bolivia
- Brazil
- Colombia
- Paraguay
- Peru
- Uruguay

== Medal summary ==
Event	Gold	Silver	Bronze
Men's tournament	Chile: Benjamin De Vidts Lobos; Felipe Eduardo Brangier Valdivia; Francisco Javier Metuaze Jarufe; Francisco Tomás Urroz Richter; Ignacio Andres Silva Aninat; Juan Pablo Larenas Hitschfeld; Lucas Westcott Ochagavia; Marcelo Diego Torrealba Otero; Martin Felipe Verschae Gonzalez; Martin Vallejos Sepulveda; Pedro Pablo Verschae Gonzalez; Rodrigo Fernandez Grossetete	Uruguay: Agustin Della Corte Bertoni; Diego Mateo Ardao Ferres; Eugenio Plottier Dell`acqua; Felipe Etcheverry Cavanna; James Mc Cubbin Di Matteo; Joaquin Alonso Canessa; Juan Francisco Torres Burwood; Manuel Ardao Ferres; Roberto Juanjuan Garese Pastorino; Sebastián Agustín Schroeder Castagno; Tomas Etcheverry Cavanna; Valentin Grille Dotti	Argentina: Jose Barros Sosa; Juan Cruz Gonzalez Rusiñol; Julián Domínguez; Lucas Ariel Bellotto; Lucas Busdrago; Maximiliano Filizzola; Maximo Provenzano; Nicolas Marcelo Menendez; Renzo Nicolas Urbano Barbier; Severiano Escobio; Tomas Alberto Passaro; Tomas Buckley
Women's tournament	Brazil: Amanda Carolina Gomes De Araújo; Beatriz Futuro Muhlbauer; Bianca Dos Santos Silva; Eshyllen Coimbra Cardoso; Haline Leme Scatrut; Isadora Cerullo; Leila Cassia Dos Santos Silva; Luiza González Da Costa Campos; Mariana Nicolau Da Silva; Rafaela De Conti Zanellato; Raquel Cristina Kochhann; Thalia Da Silva Costa	Argentina: Agostina Campos Ruiz; Anael Jemima Fernandez Terenzi; Deborah Elizabeth Fretes Hernandez; Jaquelina Estefanis Corzo Flores; Josefina Padellaro; Maria Florencia Moreno; Maria Paula Pedrozo; Mayra Stefania Aguilar; Myriam Gimena Mattus; Sofia Mariel Gonzalez; Valeria Belen Montero; Yamila Alejandra Otero	Paraguay: Aracelli Nicolini; Cecilia Benza; Cinthia Cristaldo Santander; Claudia Fernandez; Estela Servin; Giulietta Romero; Ingrid Alfonso; Lizandry Centurion; Lucero Viveros; Mayra Mendez; Natalia Justiniano; Paula Denis

== Medal table ==
Rank	Nation	Gold	Silver	Bronze	Total
1	Brazil (BRA)	1	0	0	1
1	Chile (CHI)	1	0	0	1
3	Argentina (ARG)	0	1	1	2
4	Uruguay (URU)	0	1	0	1
5	Paraguay (PAR)	0	0	1	1
Totals (5 entries)		2	2	2	6

== Men's tournament ==
Pos	Team	Pld	W	D	L	PF	PA	PD	Pts
1st place, gold medalist(s)	Chile	6	5	1	0	224	19	+205	17
2nd place, silver medalist(s)	Uruguay	6	4	1	1	192	86	+106	15 (Note: Argentina 20–36 Uruguay)
3rd place, bronze medalist(s)	Argentina	6	4	1	1	211	67	+144	15
4	Brazil	6	3	1	2	146	121	+25	13
5	Colombia	6	2	0	4	106	109	−3	10
6	Paraguay	6	1	0	5	64	191	−127	8
7	Bolivia	6	0	0	6	14	364	−350	6

Source: Cochabamba2018
Rules for classification: 1) Points; 2) Head-to-head result; 3) Point difference; 4) Points scored.
Notes:

All times are local (UTC−04:00).

27 May 2018
11:00

Uruguay	14–14	Brazil
Try: 2 Con: 2	Report	Try: 2 Con: 2

Estadio Municipal, Colcapirhua

27 May 2018
11:15

Argentina	35–5	Paraguay
Try: 5 Con: 5	Report	Try: 0 Con: 0

Estadio Municipal, Colcapirhua

27 May 2018
11:45

Chile	54–0	Bolivia
Try: 8 Con: 7	Report	Try: 0 Con: 0

Estadio Municipal, Colcapirhua

27 May 2018
13:30

Bolivia	0–41	Colombia
Try: 0 Con: 0	Report	Try: 7 Con: 3

Estadio Municipal, Colcapirhua

27 May 2018
14:00

Paraguay	0–40	Chile
Try: 0 Con: 0	Report	Try: 6 Con: 5

Estadio Municipal, Colcapirhua

27 May 2018
14:15

Brazil	7–24	Argentina
Try: 1 Con: 1	Report	Try: 4 Con: 2

Estadio Municipal, Colcapirhua

27 May 2018
15:45

Uruguay	26–17	Colombia
Try: 4 Con: 3	Report	Try: 3 Con: 1

Estadio Municipal, Colcapirhua

28 May 2018
11:00

Uruguay	17–0	Bolivia
Try: 3 Con: 1	Report	Try: 0 Con: 0

Estadio Municipal, Colcapirhua

28 May 2018
11:15

Brazil	31–7	Paraguay
Try: 2 Con: 3	Report	Try: 0 Con: 0

Estadio Municipal, Colcapirhua

28 May 2018
11:45

Argentina	28–7	Colombia
Try: 2 Con: 4	Report	Try: 1 Con: 1

Estadio Municipal, Colcapirhua

28 May 2018
13:30

Uruguay	7–35	Chile
Try: 1 Con: 1	Report	Try: 5 Con: 5

Estadio Municipal, Colcapirhua

28 May 2018
14:00

Paraguay	47–7	Bolivia
Try: 7 Con: 6	Report	Try: 1 Con: 1

Estadio Municipal, Colcapirhua

28 May 2018
14:15

Brazil	19–17	Colombia
Try: 3 Con: 2	Report	Try: 3 Con: 1

Estadio Municipal, Colcapirhua

28 May 2018
15:45

Argentina	12–12	Chile
Try: 2 Con: 1	Report	Try: 2 Con: 1

Estadio Municipal, Colcapirhua

29 May 2018
11:00

Colombia	0–31	Chile
Try: 0 Con: 0	Report	Try: 5 Con: 3

Estadio Municipal, Colcapirhua

29 May 2018
11:15

Bolivia	0–92	Argentina
Try: 0 Con: 0	Report	Try: 7 Con: 7

Estadio Municipal, Colcapirhua

29 May 2018
11:45

Paraguay	0–54	Uruguay
Try: 0 Con: 0	Report	Try: 8 Con: 7

Estadio Municipal, Colcapirhua

29 May 2018
13:15

Bolivia	7–75	Brazil
Try: 1 Con: 1	Report	Try: 11; Con: 10

Estadio Municipal, Colcapirhua

29 May 2018
13:30

Paraguay	5–24	Colombia
Try: 1 Con: 0	Report	Try: 4 Con: 2

Estadio Municipal, Colcapirhua

29 May 2018
15:45

Chile	52–0	Brazil
Try: 8 Con: 6	Report	Try: 0 Con: 0

Estadio Municipal, Colcapirhua

29 May 2018
16:30

Argentina	20–36	Uruguay
Try: 4 Con: 0	Report	Try: 6 Con: 3

Estadio Municipal, Colcapirhua

== Women's tournament ==
Pos	Team	Pld	W	D	L	PF	PA	PD	Pts
1st place, gold medalist(s)	Brazil	6	6	0	0	265	17	+248	18
2nd place, silver medalist(s)	Argentina	6	5	0	1	201	34	+167	16
3rd place, bronze medalist(s)	Paraguay	6	3	1	2	145	123	+22	13 (Note: Paraguay 19–19 Colombia; Paraguay +22 PD, Colombia +11 PD)
4	Colombia	6	3	1	2	126	115	+11	13
5	Peru	6	2	0	4	84	109	−25	10
6	Uruguay	6	1	0	5	58	183	−125	8
7	Bolivia	6	0	0	6	10	308	−298	6

Source: Cochabamba2018
Rules for classification: 1) Points; 2) Head-to-head result; 3) Point difference; 4) Points scored.
Notes:

All times are local (UTC−04:00).

27 May 2018
10:00

Argentina	38–0	Paraguay
Try: 6 Con: 4	Report	Try: 0 Con: 0

Estadio Municipal, Colcapirhua

27 May 2018
10:15

Brazil	34–0	Colombia
Try: 6 Con: 2	Report	Try: 0 Con: 0

Estadio Municipal, Colcapirhua

27 May 2018
10:45

Peru	34–0	Bolivia
Try: 6 Con: 2	Report	Try: 0 Con: 0

Estadio Municipal, Colcapirhua

27 May 2018
12:30

Bolivia	0–41	Uruguay
Try: 0 Con: 0	Report	Try: 7 Con: 3

Estadio Municipal, Colcapirhua

27 May 2018
12:45

Colombia	15–14	Peru
Try: 3 Con: 0	Report	Try: 2 Con: 2

Estadio Municipal, Colcapirhua

27 May 2018
13:15

Paraguay	12–42	Brazil
Try: 2 Con: 1	Report	Try: 6 Con: 6

Estadio Municipal, Colcapirhua

27 May 2018
15:30

Argentina	38–0	Uruguay
Try: 6 Con: 4	Report	Try: 0 Con: 0

Estadio Municipal, Colcapirhua

28 May 2018
10:00

Argentina	53–0	Bolivia
Try: 9 Con: 4	Report	Try: 0 Con: 0

Estadio Municipal, Colcapirhua

28 May 2018
10:00

Paraguay	19–19	Colombia
Try: 3 Con: 2	Report	Try: 3 Con: 2

Estadio Municipal, Colcapirhua

28 May 2018
10:30

Brazil	47–0	Uruguay
Try: 4 Con: 4	Report	Try: 0 Con: 0

Estadio Municipal, Colcapirhua

28 May 2018
12:30

Colombia	47–5	Bolivia
Try: 7 Con: 6	Report	Try: 1 Con: 0

Estadio Municipal, Colcapirhua

28 May 2018
12:45

Paraguay	29–7	Uruguay
Try: 5 Con: 2	Report	Try: 1 Con: 0

Estadio Municipal, Colcapirhua

28 May 2018
13:15

Argentina	29–0	Peru
Try: 5 Con: 2	Report	Try: 0 Con: 0

Estadio Municipal, Colcapirhua

28 May 2018
15:30

Brazil	43–0	Peru
Try: 7 Con: 4	Report	Try: 0 Con: 0

Estadio Municipal, Colcapirhua

29 May 2018
10:00

Uruguay	5–24	Peru
Try: 1 Con: 0	Report	Try: 4 Con: 2

Estadio Municipal, Colcapirhua

29 May 2018
10:15

Bolivia	0–65	Brazil
Try: 0 Con: 0	Report	Try: 11; Con: 5

Estadio Municipal, Colcapirhua

29 May 2018
10:30

Colombia	0–38	Argentina
Try: 0 Con: 0	Report	Try: 6 Con: 4

Estadio Municipal, Colcapirhua

29 May 2018
12:30

Uruguay	5–45	Colombia
Try: 1 Con: 0	Report	Try: 7 Con: 5

Estadio Municipal, Colcapirhua

29 May 2018
12:45

Bolivia	5–68	Paraguay
Try: 1 Con: 0	Report	Try: 10; Con: 9

Estadio Municipal, Colcapirhua

29 May 2018
15:30

Peru	12–17	Paraguay
Try: 2 Con: 1	Report	Try: 3 Con: 1

Estadio Municipal, Colcapirhua

29 May 2018
16:00

Argentina	5–34	Brazil
Try: 1 Con: 0	Report	Try: 6 Con: 2

Estadio Municipal, Colcapirhua
