= Raquel Kochhann =

Brazilian rugby sevens player

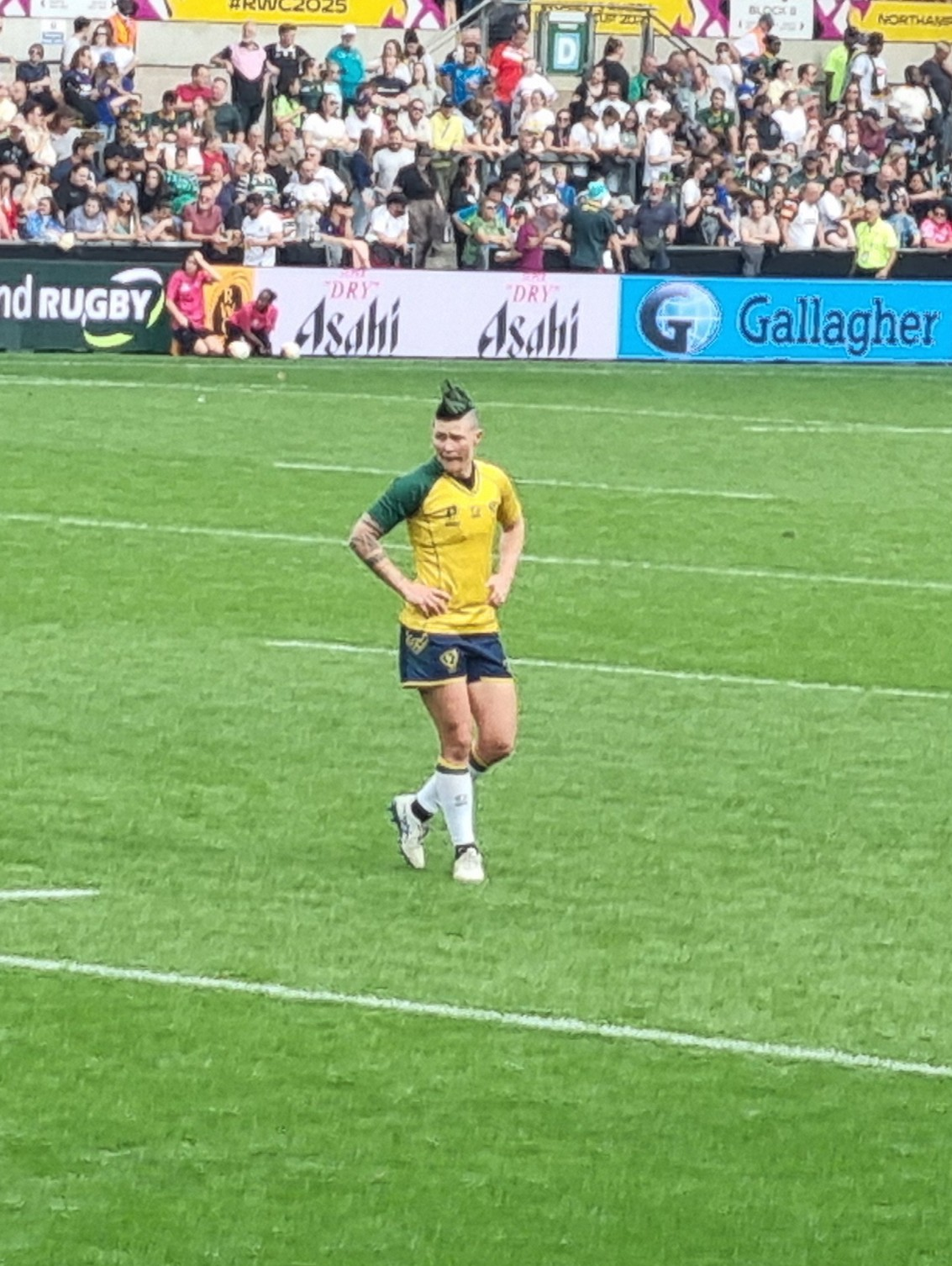
- 2025 Rugby World Cup in Northampton
- Full name: Raquel Cristina Kochhann
- Born: 6 October 1992 (age 34) Saudades, Santa Catarina, Brazil
- Height: 1.67 m (5 ft 6 in)
- Weight: 66 kg (146 lb)

Rugby union career
- Position: Fly-half
Senior career
Years	Team	Apps	(Points)
	Charrua		(0)
International career
Years	Team	Apps	(Points)
	Brazil	8	(25)
National sevens team
Years	Team		Comps
2014–	Brazil		
Medal record
Women's rugby sevens
Representing Brazil
Pan American Games
Bronze medal – third place	2015 Toronto	Team competition
South American Games
Gold medal – first place	2018 Cochabamba	Team competition

Raquel Cristina Kochhann (born 6 October 1992) is a Brazilian rugby union and sevens player. She competed for Brazil at the 2016 Summer Olympics in Rio and at the 2020 Summer Olympics in Tokyo.

== Rugby career ==
Kochhann won a bronze medal at the 2015 Pan American Games as a member of the Brazil women's national rugby sevens team. She represented Brazil in Rugby sevens at the 2016 Summer Olympics.

Kochhann graduated in Physical Education at Universidade Estácio. In 2024, she returned to the Brazilian sevens side for the Women's SVNS Perth tournament after undergoing treatment for breast cancer. She played in all the SVNS tournaments after Perth until the final competition in Madrid.

At the 2024 Summer Olympics in Paris, Kochhann became the first rugby sevens player from Brazil to play three times the Olympic Games, together with Luiza Campos. Kochhann was flag bearer in the Paris 2024 Olympic Games with sprint canoeist Isaquias Queiroz.

In the same year, Kochhann played for the Brazil women's national rugby union team in the 2025 Women's Rugby World Cup qualifiers when Brazil defeated Colombia to qualify for the first time to a Women's Rugby World Cup.

In July 2025, she was subsequently named in Brazil's squad for the Women's Rugby World Cup in England.

Olympic Games
Preceded by Edson Bindilatti; Jaqueline Mourão	Flagbearer for Brazil; París 2024; With: Isaquias Queiroz	Succeeded by Incumbent
