= Gemma Etheridge =

Australian rugby union player

- Born: Gemma Etheridge OAM; 1 December 1986 (age 39) Tamworth, New South Wales, Australia
- Height: 1.69 m (5 ft 7 in)
- Weight: 66 kg (146 lb)

Rugby union career
Amateur team(s)
Years	Team	Apps	(Points)
- The Tribe
National sevens team
Years	Team		Comps
2012–	Australia		
Medal record
Women's rugby sevens
Representing Australia
Olympic Games
Gold medal – first place	2016 Rio de Janeiro	Team competition

Gemma Etheridge OAM (born 1 December 1986) is a semi-professional Australian Rugby Union player. She represents Australia in Sevens Rugby. Born in Tamworth, New South Wales and playing for The Tribe at a club level, she debuted for Australia in November 2012. She won a gold medal at the 2016 Summer Olympics in Rio.

Gemma Etheridge, who is the twin sister of fellow Rugby Sevens player, Nikki, is a qualified Radiographer from Tamworth, but calls Toowoomba home. Gemma is a utility and can play either as a forward or as a back. Gemma grew up on a farm and still spends a lot of weekends doing cattle work. In November 2015, Etheridge was the first female Sevens Player Director to join the Rugby Union Players’ Association (RUPA) Board. She was a member of Australia's team at the 2016 Olympics, defeating New Zealand in the final to win the inaugural Olympic gold medal in the sport.

At the 2017 Australia Day Honours she received the Medal of the Order of Australia for service to sport as a gold medallist at the Rio 2016 Olympic Games.
