= Sharni Williams =

Australian rugby union player

Sharni Smale
- Full name: Sharni Maree Smale
- Born: Sharni Maree Williams; 2 March 1988 (age 38) Batlow, New South Wales
- Height: 1.65 m (5 ft 5 in)
- Weight: 75 kg (11 st 11 lb)

Rugby union career
- Position(s): Centre, Forward
Senior career
Years	Team	Apps	(Points)
- Brumbies
–	Canberra Royals		
International career
Years	Team	Apps	(Points)
2008 – present	Australia		
National sevens team
Years	Team		Comps
2011–2024	Australia 7s		
- Rugby league career

Playing information
- Position: Centre
Club
Years	Team	Pld	T	G	FG	P
2024	Cronulla Sharks	4	0	0	0	0
- Source: As of 22 November 2026
Medal record
Women's rugby sevens
Representing Australia
Olympic Games
Gold medal – first place	2016 Rio de Janeiro	Team competition
Rugby Sevens World Cup
Gold medal – first place	2022 Cape Town	Team competition
Commonwealth Games
Gold medal – first place	2022 Birmingham	Team competition
Silver medal – second place	2018 Gold Coast	Team competition

Sharni Maree Smale OAM (nee Williams; born 2 March 1988) is a female Australian rugby union and rugby league player. She has played in the centre position for Australia, the Brumbies, and from 2008 to 2012 for the Canberra Royals. She won a gold medal at the 2016 Summer Olympics in Rio.

== Rugby career ==
Williams made her international debut for Australia against New Zealand on 14 October 2008 at Viking Park in Canberra. Some days before, she collected three tries in an unofficial test match won 95-0 by the Wallaroos against an Australian President’s XV team.

During the 2010 Women's Rugby World Cup in England, Williams scored one try against Wales and two in Australia's 62-0 victory over South Africa.

She was awarded ACT Rugby Rookie of the Year 2008 and Australian Women's Player of the Year 2010.

Williams made the transition to rugby sevens in 2011, earning a spot in the Australian women’s sevens team where she played every leg of the Women's Sevens World Series from its inception in November 2012. Injury ruled her out of the Sao Paulo Sevens tournament in February 2016, however she returned in time to be named in the final round of the 2015-16 season in Clermont that saw her side win the country's first-ever World Series.

Williams was co-captain of Australia's team at the 2016 Olympics, defeating New Zealand in the final to win the inaugural Olympic gold medal in the sport.

On Australia Day 2017, Williams, along with her Rio team mates, was awarded an Order of Australia Medal.

Williams was named in the Australia squad for the Rugby sevens at the 2020 Summer Olympics. The team came second in the pool round but then lost to Fiji 14-12 in the quarterfinals.

Williams won a gold medal with the Australian sevens team at the 2022 Commonwealth Games in Birmingham. She was a member of the Australian team that won the 2022 Sevens Rugby World Cup held in Cape Town, South Africa in September 2022. She was also selected in the Wallaroos team for the delayed 2022 Rugby World Cup in New Zealand.

In 2024, She was named in Australia's women's sevens side for the Summer Olympics in Paris.

Prior to the 2024 Olympics, she announced an intention to retire from international Rugby Sevens after the games.

== Rugby League career ==
Following the 2024 Olympics, she signed with NRLW team Cronulla Sharks for the 2024 season. She made her debut on 18 August 2024, the first of four games that season.

== Personal life ==
Aside from her rugby union career, Williams is a qualified motor mechanic. She is openly lesbian, and changed her name to Smale after marrying partner Mel Smale in 2023.

== Achievements and honours ==
- 2017, Canada Sevens Langford dream team
- At Los Angeles on 2 and 3 March 2024 she competed in her fiftieth international sevens tournament. At the time only five other women had reached this milestone, among them being Charlotte Caslick, Chloé Pelle and Portia Woodman.
