= Bianca Farella =

Canadian rugby union and sevens player (born 1992)

- Born: April 10, 1992 (age 34) Montreal, Quebec
- Height: 1.73 m (5 ft 8 in)
- Weight: 74 kg (163 lb)
- School: Miss Edgar's & Miss Cramp's High School
- University: Concordia University

Rugby union career
Amateur team(s)
Years	Team	Apps	(Points)
–	TMR RFC		
2012	Concordia Stingers		
2010?-2011?	Dawson Blues		
National sevens team
Years	Team		Comps
2013-	Canada		
Medal record
Women's rugby sevens
Representing Canada
Olympic Games
Bronze medal – third place	2016 Rio de Janeiro	Team competition
World Cup 7s
Silver medal – second place	2013 Russia	Team competition

Bianca Farella (born April 10, 1992) is a Canadian rugby player. In 2016, she was named to Canada's first ever women's rugby sevens Olympic team.

== Rugby career ==
At the age of 13, Farella chose to join rugby as her spring sport due to her preference for team sports and because her high school Miss Edgar's and Miss Cramp's School only offered tennis, badminton, and rugby as spring sports. In CEGEP, Farella joined the Dawson College Blues. She was a three-time all-star and the team MVP.

During her one-year playing with the Concordia Stingers in 2012, she led the Quebec university women's rugby conference in tries scored (12 tries for 60 points). She was named the RSEQ Conference All-Star, RSEQ Rookie of the Year, CIS Rookie of the Year, and CIS All-Star. After her stellar performance in the CIS, Farella went to British Columbia to join the centralized women's Rugby Canada program.

After one year with the national team, she was part of the squad that won silver at the 2013 Rugby World Cup Sevens. At the 2014 FISU in Brazil, Farella captained the Canadian team to gold. A year later, she missed the 2015 Pan Am Games to undergo shoulder surgery. Farella rejoined the national squad during the second leg of the 2015-16 World Rugby Women's Sevens Series in São Paulo. By the season's end, Farella ranked ninth in the world with 315 career series points (and second, behind Ghislaine Landry, for all-time in series tries for Canada with 63 points.

In June 2021, Farella was named to Canada's 2020 Summer Olympics team.

== Achievements and honours ==
- 2017, Canada Sevens Langford dream team
- 2018, Rugby Canada Player of the Year (7s)
