= Lina Guérin =

French rugby union player

- Born: 16 April 1991 (age 35)
- Height: 1.75 m (5 ft 9 in)
- Weight: 64 kg (141 lb)

Rugby union career
- Position: Fullback
International career
Years	Team	Apps	(Points)
2015-present	France		
National sevens team
Years	Team		Comps
2016	France		
Medal record
Women's rugby sevens
Representing France
Olympic Games
Silver medal – second place	2020 Tokyo	Team competition

Lina Guérin (French pronunciation: [lina ɡeʁɛ̃]; born 16 April 1991) is a French rugby union player. She was a member of the France women's national rugby sevens team to the 2016 Summer Olympics. She has played in 22 matches in the Women's Sevens Series so far, made 12 tries and scored 60 points.
