= Emilee Cherry =

- Born: 2 November 1992 (age 34)
- Height: 1.68 m (5 ft 6 in)
- Weight: 70 kg (154 lb)

Rugby union career
- Position: Back
Amateur team(s)
Years	Team	Apps	(Points)
	Toowoomba Bears		(0)
National sevens team
Years	Team		Comps
2012–2021	Australia		159
Medal record
Women's rugby sevens
Representing Australia
Olympic Games
Gold medal – first place	2016 Rio de Janeiro	Team competition
Commonwealth Games
Silver medal – second place	2018 Gold Coast	Team competition

Emilee Jane Cherry OAM (born 2 November 1992) is a former Australian Rugby Union player. She represented Australia in Sevens Rugby and won a gold medal at the 2016 Summer Olympics in Rio.

== Rugby career ==
Born in Roma, Queensland and playing for Toowoomba Bears at a club level, Cherry debuted for Australia in November 2012. As of December 2015, she had 14 caps. Cherry is a dual international, having represented Australia in Touch football (rugby league).

Cherry was the 2013/14 Women’s Sevens World Player of the Year, her game lifting after Tim Walsh took over as Head Coach in September 2013. She scored the most tries in the series (33), scored the most points (195) and was the stand-out player during the 2013–14 IRB World Series season as she was named the 2014 Women's Sevens Player of the Year. Representative honours include Touch Football Australia, Aussie Pearls and Queensland.

Cherry was a member of Australia's team at the 2016 Olympics, defeating New Zealand in the final to win the inaugural Olympic gold medal in the sport.

On 28 May 2021, she retired from rugby, citing injury and motherhood her reasons to retire.

=== World Rugby Hall of Fame ===
Cherry was announced as one of five players that will be inducted into the World Rugby Hall of Fame at the World Rugby Awards in Monaco on 24 November 2024.
