= Khaterinne Medina =

- Born: 31 October 1992 (age 34)
- Height: 1.62 m (5 ft 4 in)
- Weight: 60 kg (130 lb; 9 st 6 lb)

Rugby union career
National sevens team
Years	Team	Comps
- Colombia

Khaterinne Medina (born 31 October 1992) is a Colombian rugby sevens player. She will be representing Colombia in rugby sevens as part of the Colombia women's national rugby sevens team at the 2016 Summer Olympics.
