= Jessica Javelet =

American rugby union player

- Born: June 25, 1985 (age 41)
- Height: 1.69 m (5 ft 6 1/2 in)
- Weight: 62 kg (137 lb; 9 st 11 lb)

Rugby union career
- Position: Wing
International career
Years	Team	Apps	(Points)
2017	United States	3	(5)
National sevens team
Years	Team		Comps
2014	United States		

Jessica Javelet (born June 25, 1985) is an American rugby union player. She attended the University of Louisville from 2003 to 2007, where she played field hockey. She led the nation in scoring her junior season (2005), and she finished her career as a three-time All-American and the school record-holder for both points and goals. She was also a three-time academic All-American, a finalist for the NCAA Woman of the Year Award, and the valedictorian of her 2007 class, having graduated with a 4.0 GPA in marketing. She is a former field hockey player and played for the United States women's team from 2006 to 2009.

She made her debut for the sevens team at the 2014 USA Women's Sevens. Javelet was selected for the sevens team for the Rio Olympics. She and her team won their first Olympic match in Rio against Colombia by 48 points to 0 points.
