= Audrey Amiel =

French rugby sevens player

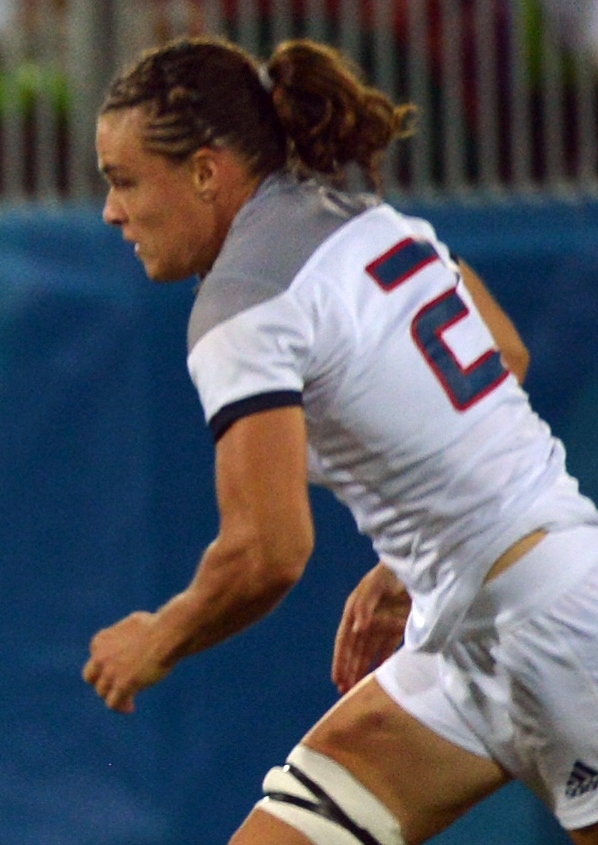
- Born: 3 March 1987 (age 39)
- Height: 1.64 m (5 ft 5 in)
- Weight: 65 kg (143 lb)

Rugby union career
National sevens team
Years	Team	Comps
- France

Audrey Amiel (born 3 March 1987) is a French rugby sevens player. She was selected as a member of the France women's national rugby sevens team to the 2016 Summer Olympics.

She is a Firefighter by profession.
