= Alexis Tapsell =

New Zealand rugby union player

- Born: 24 April 1986 (age 40)
- Height: 1.75 m (5 ft 9 in)

Rugby union career
National sevens team
Years	Team	Comps
2013–?	New Zealand	

Alexis Tapsell (born 24 April 1986) is a New Zealand rugby union player. She represented New Zealand at the 2013 Rugby World Cup Sevens in Russia. In 2015, she was named in the Black Ferns sevens squad to the Women's Sevens Series. She missed out on selection for the 2015 Dubai Women's Sevens due to a neck injury.
