= Bui Baravilala =

American rugby union player

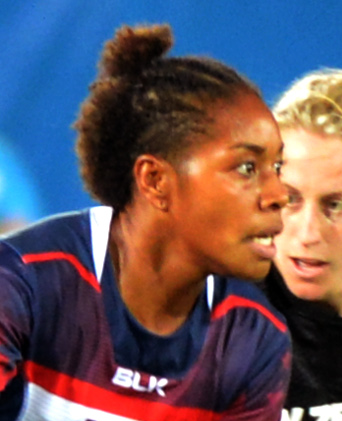
- Full name: Akalaini Baravilala
- Born: July 12, 1991 (age 35) Honolulu, Hawaii, U.S.
- Height: 5 ft 6 in (168 cm)
- Weight: 165 lb (75 kg)

Rugby union career
- Position: Fullback
International career
| Years | Team | Apps | (Points) |
| 2014–2020 | United States | 11 | (0) |
National sevens team
| Years | Team | | Comps |
- United States

Akalaini "Bui" Baravilala (born July 12, 1991) is a former American rugby union and sevens player. She played for the United States women's sevens and fifteens team's. She represented the United States at the 2014 Rugby World Cup and at the 2016 Summer Olympics in rugby sevens.

== Early life ==
Baravilala attended Radford High School in Honolulu and played volleyball and basketball. She is of iTaukei descent from Fiji.

== Rugby career ==
Baravilala was discovered by the late Ric Suggitt, who was then the USA Women's Sevens Head Coach, at an amateur sevens tournament in 2010. She then made appearances for the United States Under-20s XV's side in 2010 and 2011. She was also one of the first players to receive a full-time contract at the U.S. Olympic Training Site in Chula Vista.

She made her international sevens debut for the United States in 2012 at the Dubai Sevens.

In 2014, she was selected for the United States fifteens team and made her international debut against Wales at the Women's Rugby World Cup in France.

She was named in the United States sevens team and competed at the 2016 Summer Olympics in Rio.

In 2020, Baravilala announced her retirement from international rugby.
