= Amanda Araújo =

Brazilian rugby union player (born 1990)

- Full name: Amanda Carolina Gomes de Araújo
- Born: February 23, 1990 (age 36)
- Height: 1.62 m (5 ft 4 in)
- Weight: 54 kg (119 lb)

Rugby union career
- Position: Centre
International career
Years	Team	Apps	(Points)
2023	Brazil		(0)
National sevens team
Years	Team		Comps
- Brazil
Medal record
Women's rugby sevens
Representing Brazil
South American Games
Gold medal – first place	2018 Cochabamba	Team competition

Amanda Carolina Gomes de Araújo (born February 23, 1990) is a Brazilian rugby union player.

== Rugby career ==
Araújo was selected as a member of the Brazil women's national rugby sevens team to the 2016 Summer Olympics.

In July 2023, she was named in Brazil's fifteens team to play Colombia for a spot in the inaugural WXV competition. She started in her sides 23–24 loss to Colombia in their first of two games.
