= Brittany Benn =

Canadian rugby union player (born 1989)

- Born: April 23, 1989 (age 37) Napanee, Ontario, Canada
- Height: 165 cm (5 ft 5 in)
- Weight: 68 kg (150 lb)

Rugby union career
- Position: Centre
Senior career
Years	Team	Apps	(Points)
- Guelph Redcoats
International career
Years	Team	Apps	(Points)
2013–	Canada		
Medal record
Representing Canada
Women's rugby sevens
Olympic Games
Bronze medal – third place	2016 Rio de Janeiro	Team competition
Pan American Games
Gold medal – first place	2015 Toronto	Team competition
Women's rugby union
World Cup
Silver medal – second place	2014 France	Team competition

Brittany "Britt" Benn (born April 23, 1989) is a Canadian rugby union player. She represented Canada at the 2014 Women's Rugby World Cup. She was a member of the touring squad that played France and England in November 2013.

== Career ==
Benn won a gold medal at the 2015 Pan American Games as a member of the Canadian women's rugby sevens team.

In 2016, she was named to Canada's first ever women's rugby sevens Olympic team that went on to win the bronze medal for Canada.

In June 2021, Benn was named to Canada's 2020 Summer Olympics team. She is openly lesbian.

== Honours and achievements ==
- 2017, Canada Sevens Langford dream team
- 2019, Canada Sevens Langford performance tracker player of the round
- 2019, Rugby Canada Player of the Year (7s)
