= Yume Okuroda =

Japanese rugby union player

- Born: July 6, 1994 (age 32) Matsudo, Chiba, Japan
- Height: 1.57 m (5 ft 2 in)
- Weight: 62 kg (137 lb)

Rugby union career
National sevens team
Years	Team	Comps
- Japan
Medal record
Women's rugby sevens
Representing Japan
Asian Games
Gold medal – first place	2018 Jakarta–Palembang	Team

Yume Okuroda (大黒田 裕芽, Ōkuroda Yume; born July 6, 1994) is a Japanese female rugby sevens player. She competed for the Japan women's national rugby sevens team at the 2016 Summer Olympics. They finished in tenth place. She was named in the Sakura Sevens squad to compete at the 2022 Rugby World Cup Sevens in Cape Town.
