= Ryan Carlyle =

American rugby sevens player

- Born: November 24, 1989 (age 36); Nyack, New York, U.S.
- Education: Clarkstown High School South; University of South Carolina
- Height: 5 ft 6 in (168 cm)
- Weight: 143 lb (65 kg)

Rugby union career
- Position(s): Center (XV), Hooker (7s)
International career
Years	Team	Apps	(Points)
2015	United States		
National sevens team
Years	Team		Comps
2011	United States		

Ryan Carlyle (born November 24, 1989) is an American rugby sevens player. She competed in two Rugby sevens World Cup's in 2013 and 2018, and also in the 2016 Rio Olympics.

== Rugby career ==
Carlyle made her international sevens debut for the United States in 2011 at the then IRB Women's Sevens Challenge Cup in Dubai.

Carlyle was selected as a member of the United States women's national rugby sevens team to the 2016 Summer Olympics. She was in the squad for the 2013 Rugby World Cup Sevens. She also competed at the 2018 Sevens World Cup that was held in San Francisco.

Carlyle announced her retirement from international sevens on November 20, 2018.

== Personal life ==
Carlyle attended the University of South Carolina where she studied Sport Management and Marketing and DeVry University where she studied International Business.
