= Deodoro Stadium =

Temporary stadium in Deodoro, Rio de Janeiro, Brazil

Coordinates: 22.8609°S 43.4066°W

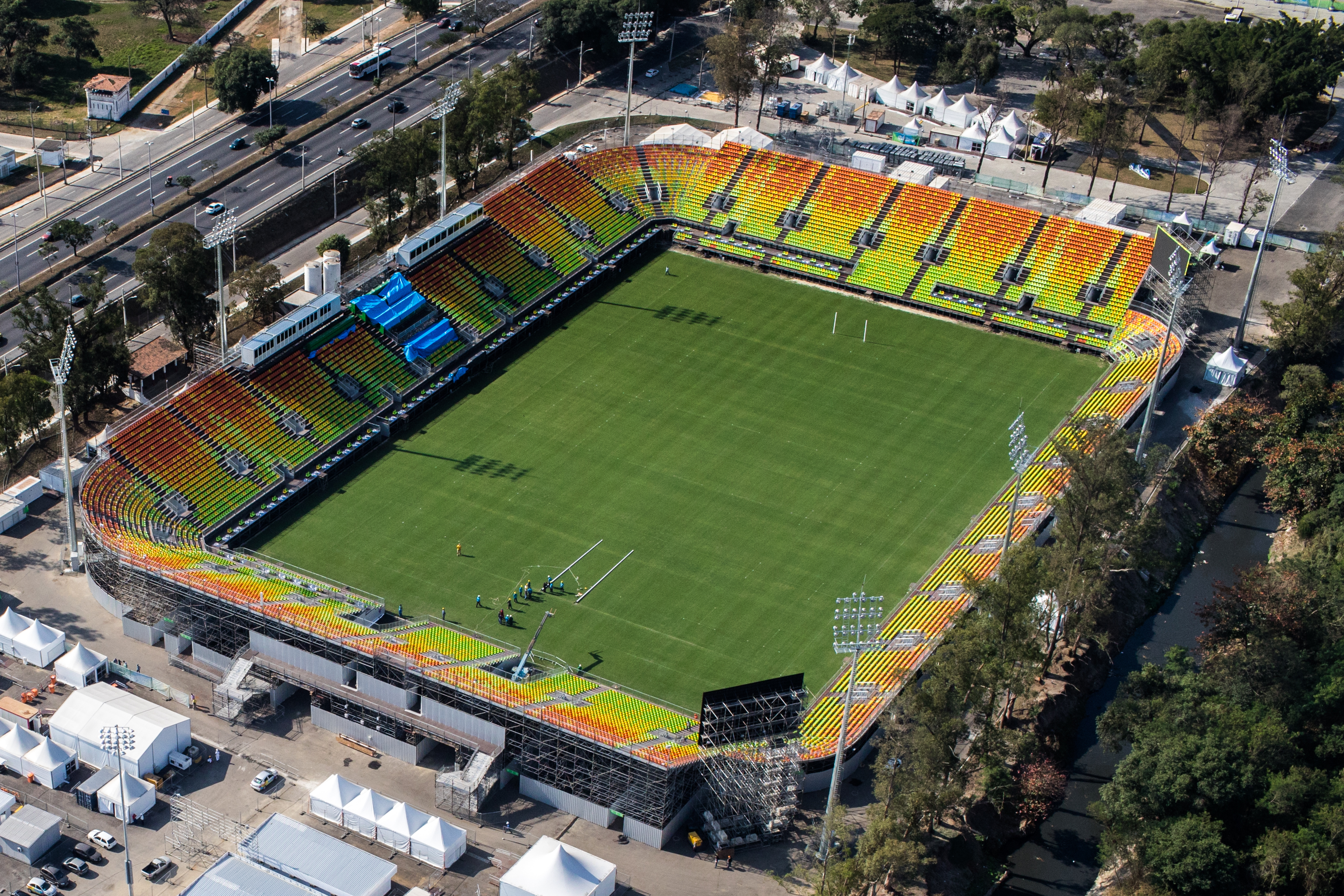
- Aerial view of Deodoro Stadium
- Interactive map of Deodoro Stadium
- Location: Deodoro Modern Pentathlon Park, Rio de Janeiro, Brazil

Deodoro Stadium was a temporary stadium at Deodoro Modern Pentathlon Park in Rio de Janeiro, Brazil. The stadium hosted rugby sevens and modern pentathlon events during the 2016 Summer Olympics. The stadium served as the venue for the seven-a-side football at the 2016 Summer Paralympics.

The Deodoro Modern Pentathlon Park hosted all five competitions within walking distance:

Deodoro Stadium
Deodoro Aquatics Centre
(Deodoro) Youth Arena

Equestrian (show jumping), Pistol shooting/running (combined)
Swimming (200 m freestyle)
Fencing (Épée)

The Deodoro Pentathlon Park was a part of the greater Deodoro Olympic venues cluster which also hosted the Olympic Whitewater Canoe/Kayak slalom, Field Hockey, Mountain Bike and BMX cycling competitions. The Mountain Bike, BMX and Whitewater venues are grouped together in the Deodoro Extreme Park (or X Park).
