= Alice Richardson =

England international rugby union player

- Full name: Alice Peta Richardson
- Born: 14 May 1987 (age 39) Worcester, Worcestershire
- Height: 1.72 m (5 ft 8 in)
- Weight: 72 kg (159 lb)

Rugby union career
- Position: Flyhalf
International career
Years	Team	Apps	(Points)
	England	36	
National sevens teams
Years	Team		Comps
- England
2016	Great Britain 7s		
Medal record
Representing England
Women's rugby union
Rugby World Cup
Silver medal – second place	2010 England	Team competition

Alice Peta Richardson (born 14 May 1986) is an English rugby union player. She represented England at the 2010 Women's Rugby World Cup. She captained the English sevens team to the 2013 Rugby World Cup Sevens. Richardson captained the sevens team earlier that year at the 2013 USA Women's Sevens for the 2012–13 IRB Women's Sevens World Series.
