= Litia Naiqato =

- Born: 25 March 1987 (age 39)
- Height: 1.8 m (5 ft 11 in)
- Weight: 76 kg (168 lb; 12 st 0 lb)

Rugby union career
National sevens team
Years	Team	Comps
- Fiji

Litia Naiqato (born 25 March 1987) is a Fijian rugby sevens player. She was selected as a member of the Fiji women's national rugby sevens team to the 2016 Summer Olympics.
