= Charlotte Caslick =

Australian rugby union and rugby league footballer

Charlotte Caslick OAM
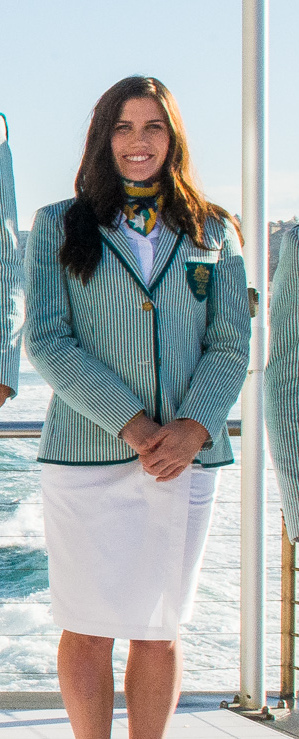
- Full name: Charlotte Emily Caslick
- Born: 9 March 1995 (age 31) Brisbane, Queensland, Australia
- Height: 172 cm (5 ft 8 in)
- Weight: 68 kg (150 lb)

Rugby union career
- Position: Back
Senior career
Years	Team	Apps	(Points)
- The Tribe
2025	Queensland Reds		
International career
Years	Team	Apps	(Points)
2025-present	Australia	1	(0)
National sevens team
Years	Team		Comps
2013-present	Australia 7s		328
- Rugby league career

Playing information
- Position: Five-eighth, Fullback
Club
Years	Team	Pld	T	G	FG	P
2020	Sydney Roosters	2	0	0	0	0
- Source: RLP As of 7 December 2020
Medal record
Women's rugby sevens
Representing Australia
Olympic Games
Gold medal – first place	2016 Rio de Janeiro	Team competition
Rugby Sevens World Cup
Gold medal – first place	2022 Cape Town	Team competition
Commonwealth Games
Gold medal – first place	2022 Birmingham	Team competition
Silver medal – second place	2018 Gold Coast	Team competition

Charlotte Emily Caslick OAM (born 9 March 1995) is an Australian professional representative and Olympic level rugby union player. She represents Australia in rugby sevens and in touch football. She won a gold medal at the 2016 Summer Olympics in Rio de Janeiro.

In 2020, following the postponement of the international sevens circuit due to the COVID-19 pandemic, she moved to rugby league, playing for the Sydney Roosters in the NRL Women's Premiership.

In 2021 with the resumption of International 7's rugby, Caslick returned to duties with the Australian 7's team. In 2022 she was co-captain of the gold medal-winning team at the 2022 Commonwealth Games in Birmingham. She was a member of the Australian team that won the 2022 Sevens Rugby World Cup held in Cape Town, South Africa in September 2022.

== Background ==
Caslick was born in Brisbane and grew up in the suburb of Corinda. She attended Brisbane State High School. She is engaged to rugby union player Lewis Holland.

== Playing career ==
=== Rugby career ===
Caslick plays for The Tribe at a club level and in 2013, after graduating from high school, she debuted for Australia. By December 2015, she had earned 13 caps, scoring 31 tries in that two-year period. Caslick has been described as "the best women's rugby sevens player on the planet." and "a key member of the Australian Women's Rugby Sevens team that is eyeing gold at [2016's] Rio Olympics."

Caslick is a dual international having represented her country at the Australian Youth Olympic Festival and 2013 Rugby Sevens World Cup as well as playing for Touch Football Australia at both age-grade and open levels. She was named in World Rugby's 2014–15 Team of the Season after another stellar season and one of four players nominated for the 2015 World Sevens Player of the Year. Charlotte was also voted player of the tournament in the Australian Nationals. Representative Honours include Touch Football Australia, Australian Youth Olympic Festival (2013) and Queensland. She was a member of Australia's team at the 2016 Olympics, defeating New Zealand in the final to win the inaugural Olympic gold medal in the sport.

In October 2016, Caslick was named as Australia's women's sevens player of the year.

Caslick was named in the Australia squad for the Rugby sevens at the 2020 Summer Olympics. The team came second in the pool round but then lost to Fiji 14–12 in the quarterfinals.

In 2024, She was chosen to lead the Australian sevens side for the Summer Olympics in Paris.

Caslick made her international fifteens debut for the Wallaroos against Fiji on 3 May 2025 at the HFC Bank Stadium in Suva. She was initially named in the Wallaroos side for the 2025 Women's Rugby World Cup in England.

On 11 August 2025 it was announced that she was ruled out of the World Cup after failing to recover from an ankle surgery. She was replaced by Manu'a Moleka.

=== Rugby league ===
In 2020, with the suspension of the World Rugby Women's Sevens Series and Tokyo Olympics due to the COVID-19 pandemic, Caslick made the switch to rugby league, joining the Sydney Roosters in the NRL Women's Premiership. A North Queensland Cowboys fan, she opted to join the Roosters over the Brisbane Broncos, the Cowboys' arch-rivals.

In Round 1 of the 2020 NRL Women's season, Caslick made her debut the Roosters, starting at five-eighth and running for 163 metres in a 18–4 win over the St George Illawarra Dragons. A week later, in the Roosters' 22–12 Round 2 win over the New Zealand Warriors, Caslick sustained two small factures to her spine, ruling her out for the rest of the NRLW season.

== Honors and achievements ==
- 2016, World Rugby Women's Sevens Player of the Year
- 2019, Kitakyushu Sevens performance tracker player of the round

== See also ==
- List of players who have converted from one football code to another
