= Tais Balconi =

Brazilian rugby sevens player

Taís Balconi
- Full name: Taís Bernal Balconi
- Born: April 11, 1991 (age 35) Florianópolis, Santa Catarina, Brazil
- Height: 1.64 m (5 ft 5 in)
- Weight: 62.8 kg (138 lb)

Rugby union career
National sevens team
| Years | Team | Comps |
- Brazil

Taís Bernal Balconi (born April 11, 1991) is a Brazilian rugby sevens player. She was selected as a member of the Brazil women's national rugby sevens team to the 2016 Summer Olympics.
