= Marina Bravo =

Spanish rugby sevens player

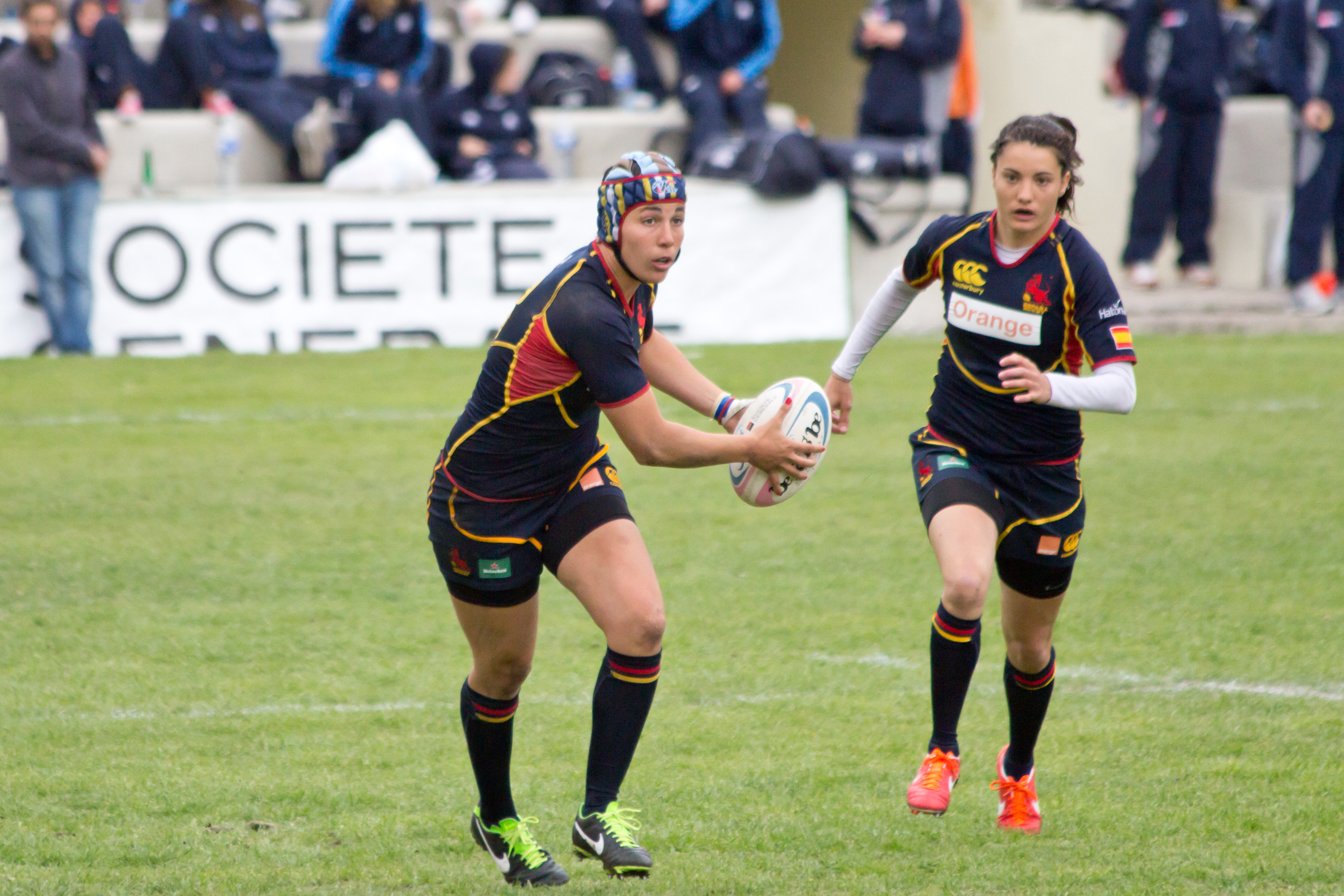
- Bravo carrying the ball during the 2013 Women's European Qualification Tournament.
- Full name: Marina Bravo Bragado
- Born: 2 July 1989 (age 37)
- Height: 1.73 m (5 ft 8 in)
- Weight: 68 kg (150 lb)

Rugby union career
- Position: Centre
International career
| Years | Team | Apps | (Points) |
- Spain
National sevens team
| Years | Team | | Comps |
| 2012–2020 | Spain | | 135 |

Marina Bravo Bragado (born 2 July 1989) is a Spanish rugby union and sevens player. She competed for Spain at the 2014 and 2017 Women's Rugby World Cups. She plays for CR El Salvador Women's team.

Bravo was part of the Spanish sevens team that won the final qualifying spot for the Summer Olympics. She eventually competed at the 2016 Summer Olympics in Rio.

She previously played for Club de Rugby Majadahonda and CR Cisneros. She was a member of Spain's sevens squad to the 2013 Rugby World Cup Sevens in Moscow, Russia.
