= Fanny Horta =

French rugby union player

- Born: 22 January 1986 (age 40)
- Height: 1.65 m (5 ft 5 in)
- Weight: 59 kg (130 lb)

Rugby union career
- Position(s): Centre, Wing
Senior career
Years	Team	Apps	(Points)
- USA Perpignan
International career
Years	Team	Apps	(Points)
	France	25	
National sevens team
Years	Team		Comps
- France
Medal record
Representing France
Women's rugby sevens
Olympic Games
Silver medal – second place	2020 Tokyo	Team competition

Fanny Horta (born 22 January 1986) is a rugby union player. She represented France at the 2006 Women's Rugby World Cup, and 2010 Women's Rugby World Cup. She captained France at the 2014 China Women's Sevens. She was selected as a member of France's women's national rugby sevens team to the 2016 Summer Olympics.
