= María Casado (rugby union) =

Spanish rugby player (born 1985)

- Born: 25 December 1985 (age 40) Valencia de Don Juan, Spain
- Height: 1.67 m (5 ft 6 in)
- Weight: 63 kg (139 lb; 9 st 13 lb)

Rugby union career
International career
Years	Team	Apps	(Points)
2012–?	Spain	14	(0)
National sevens team
Years	Team		Comps
- Spain

María Casado (born 25 December 1985) is a Spanish rugby sevens player. She was selected for the Spanish women's sevens team to the 2016 Summer Olympics. She also was part of the team that secured the last spot for the Rio Olympics. She played at the 2013 Rugby World Cup Sevens.
