= Joanne Watmore =

- Born: 25 September 1986 (age 40)
- Height: 1.81 m (5 ft 11 1/2 in)
- Weight: 72 kg (159 lb; 11 st 5 lb)

Rugby union career
- Position: Back
International career
Years	Team	Apps	(Points)
2012-present	England	4	(15)
National sevens teams
Years	Team		Comps
2010	Great Britain		
–	England		
- Rugby league career

Playing information
Representative
Years	Team	Pld	T	G	FG	P
2008–11	England	13	13	0	0	52

Joanne Watmore (born 25 September 1986) is a British rugby union and rugby league player. She has played for England women's national rugby league team, England women's national rugby union team and for England women's national rugby sevens team. She was selected as a member of the Great Britain women's national rugby sevens team to the 2016 Summer Olympics. Watmore is England Sevens Top Try Scorer.

== Career ==
=== Rugby league ===
On 13 July 2008, Watmore made her England debut in a 42–4 win over France. She was selected for the England squad for the 2008 Women's Rugby League World Cup and scored a hat-trick in England's opening game against Russia. England finished the tournament in third place with Watmore as one of the scorers in the 24–0 play-off win over the Pacific Islands team. Further appearances for England came against in the 2010 tour of New Zealand and in the annual test matches against France.

=== Rugby Union ===
On 3 November 2012, Watmore scored on her debut for the England women's national rugby union team in a 23–13 win over France. Watmore played at the 2013 Rugby World Cup Sevens. Watmore was picked for the final selection of Great Britain's national rugby sevens team competing at the 2016 Summer Olympics. Watmore was the first try scorer for Team GB in the 2016 Olympics. The team finished the tournament on 4th place losing against New Zealand in the semifinal and against Canada in the match for the bronze medals.
