= Luiza Campos =

Brazilian rugby sevens player (1990-)

- Full name: Luiza González da Costa Campos
- Born: July 30, 1990 (age 36)
- Height: 1.65 m (5 ft 5 in)
- Weight: 64 kg (141 lb; 10 st 1 lb)

Rugby union career
- Position: Scrum-half
Senior career
Years	Team	Apps	(Points)
	Charrua		(0)
International career
Years	Team	Apps	(Points)
	Brazil	11	(5)
National sevens team
Years	Team		Comps
- Brazil
Medal record
Women's rugby sevens
Representing Brazil
South American Games
Gold medal – first place	2018 Cochabamba	Team competition

Luiza González da Costa Campos (born July 30, 1990) is a Brazilian rugby union and sevens player. She competed for Brazil at the 2016, 2020 and 2024 Summer Olympics.

== Rugby career ==
Campos studied at Universidade Estácio. She was selected as a member of Brazil's women's national sevens team to the 2016 Summer Olympics.

Campos represented Brazil at the 2022 Rugby World Cup Sevens in Cape Town. In July 2023, she was named in Brazil's XVs squad to play Colombia for a spot in the inaugural WXV competition.

She led Brazil at the 2024 Summer Olympics in Paris.

In July 2025, she was named in Brazil's XVs squad for the Women's Rugby World Cup in England.
