= Ghislaine Landry =

Canadian rugby union and sevens player

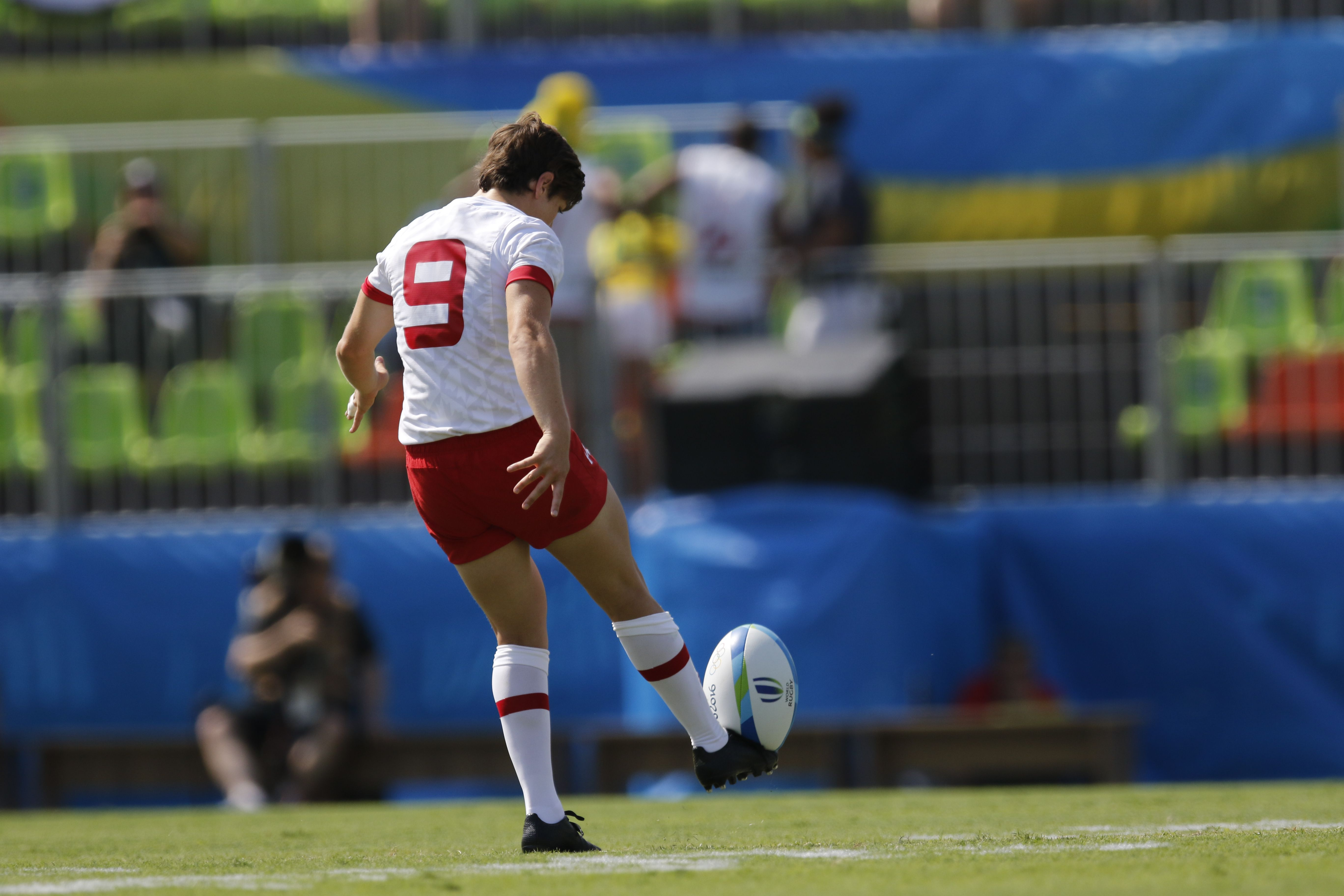
- Landry with Canada at the 2016 Olympic Games
- Born: April 27, 1988 (age 38) Toronto, Ontario, Canada
- Height: 163 cm (5 ft 4 in)
- Weight: 65 kg (143 lb)
- University: St Francis Xavier University

Rugby union career
Amateur team(s)
Years	Team	Apps	(Points)
–	Xavier X-Women		
–	Toronto Scottish		
National sevens team
Years	Team		Comps
2011–present	Canada		
Medal record
Women's rugby sevens
Representing Canada
Olympic Games
Bronze medal – third place	2016 Rio	Team competition
Pan American Games
Gold medal – first place	2015 Toronto	Team competition
World Cup 7s
Silver medal – second place	2013 Russia	Team competition

Ghislaine Landry (born April 27, 1988) is a Canadian rugby union player. She won a gold medal at the 2015 Pan American Games as a member of the Canadian women's rugby sevens team. During the 2016–17 season, Landry succeeded Jen Kish as captain of the national sevens. On October 20, 2018, Landry became the first woman to hit the 1,000 point milestone in the women's sevens World Series.

In 2016, Landry was named to Canada's first ever women's rugby sevens Olympic team, which won the bronze medal in a match against Great Britain. In 2017, Landry moved into first place all-time in HSBC World Rugby Women's Sevens Series scoring with 706 points. In June 2021, Landry was named to Canada's 2020 Summer Olympics team.

By the time Landry retired in November 2021 she had scored a total of 1,356 career points in the women sevens series. This made her highest women points scorer in the history of the sevens series until in March 2024 her score was over taken by Tyla Nathan-Wong. Her points were obtained from 143 tries and 319 conversions over 208 games.

Landry attended Saint Francis Xavier University.

She came out as homosexual in 2006 and married her partner in 2018.

== Achievements and honours ==
- 2013, Canada, Sevens Silver medallist at Rugby World Cup Sevens.
- 2016, Canada, Sevens Bronze medallist at Rio Olympic Games.
- 2017, Canada Sevens Langford dream team.
- 2018, Canada, Sevens Captain of Canadian Rugby World Cup Sevens team.
