= 2025 Women's Rugby World Cup Pool D =

Pool D of the 2025 Women's Rugby World Cup began in August 2025. The pool includes debutants Brazil, they are placed alongside France, Italy, and South Africa.

== Teams ==
The draw for the pool stage took place on 17 October 2024 in London. A seeding system was used for the draw, with teams allocated a seed based on their World Rugby Women's World Rankings as of 14 October 2024. The top four teams in the rankings were placed into band 1 and prepopulated into the first position in each pool. The remaining 12 teams were drawn into bands 2, 3, and 4 based on their rankings and drawn one by one.

| Pos. | Team | Band | Confederation | Method of qualification | Date of qualification | Apps. | Last | Previous best performance | World Rugby Rankings | |
| Pos. | Team | Band | Confederation | Method of qualification | Date of qualification | Apps. | Last | Previous best performance | 14 October 2024 (Note: The rankings of 14 October 2024 were used for seeding for the draw.) | 18 August 2025 (Note: The final rankings before the tournament started) |
|---|---|---|---|---|---|---|---|---|---|---|
| D1 | France | 1 | Europe | Top 4 at 2021 RWC | 29 October 2022 | 10th | 2021 | Third place (1991, 1994, 2002, 2006, 2014, 2017, 2021) | 4 | 4 |
| C2 | Italy | 2 | Europe | 2024 WXV 2 | 12 October 2024 | 6th | 2021 | Quarter final (2021) | 8 | 7 |
| D3 | South Africa | 3 | Africa | Africa 1 | 12 May 2024 | 5th | 2021 | 10th (2010, 2014) | 12 | 12 |
| D4 | Brazil | 4 | South America | Americas 1 | 29 June 2024 | 1st | — | Debut | 42 | 25 |

== Standings ==
| Pos | Team | Pld | W | D | L | PF | PA | PD | TF | TA | TB | LB | Pts | |
|---|---|---|---|---|---|---|---|---|---|---|---|---|---|---|
| 1 | France | 3 | 3 | 0 | 0 | 165 | 15 | +150 | 26 | 2 | 2 | 0 | 14 | Advance to knockout stage |
| 2 | South Africa | 3 | 2 | 0 | 1 | 105 | 87 | +18 | 16 | 13 | 2 | 0 | 10 | Advance to knockout stage |
| 3 | Italy | 3 | 1 | 0 | 2 | 88 | 56 | +32 | 16 | 8 | 2 | 1 | 7 | |
| 4 | Brazil | 3 | 0 | 0 | 3 | 14 | 214 | −200 | 1 | 36 | 0 | 0 | 0 | |

Source: World Rugby

== Matches ==
The match schedule was confirmed by World Rugby on 22 October 2024. The first match of pool D will be between France and Italy.

=== France vs Italy ===
23 August 2025
20:15 BST (UTC+1)

| France | 24–0 | Italy |
| Try: Grisez 27' c Khalfaoui 45' c Escudero 62' c Con: Bourgeois (3/3) 28', 46', 63'; Pen: Bourgeois (1/2) 40+2' | Report |

Sandy Park, Exeter
Attendance: 7,052
Referee: Sara Cox (England)

| FB | 15 | Morgane Bourgeois |
| RW | 14 | Joanna Grisez |
| OC | 13 | Marine Ménager (cc) |
| IC | 12 | Gabrielle Vernier | (substituted off) 67' |
| LW | 11 | Kelly Arbey |
| FH | 10 | Carla Arbez | (substituted off) 67' |
| SH | 9 | Alexandra Chambon | (substituted off) 67' |
| N8 | 8 | Teani Feleu | (substituted off) 59' |
| OF | 7 | Léa Champon |
| BF | 6 | Charlotte Escudero |
| RL | 5 | Madoussou Fall Raclot |
| LL | 4 | Manaé Feleu (cc) | (substituted off) 71' |
| TP | 3 | Assia Khalfaoui | (substituted off) 57' |
| HK | 2 | Manon Bigot | (substituted off) 57' |
| LP | 1 | Yllana Brosseau | (substituted off) 57' |
Replacements:
| HK | 16 | Agathe Gérin | (substituted in) 57' |
| PR | 17 | Annaëlle Deshayes | (substituted in) 57' |
| PR | 18 | Rose Bernadou | (substituted in) 57' |
| BR | 19 | Axelle Berthoumieu | (substituted in) 59' |
| BR | 20 | Séraphine Okemba | (substituted in) 71' |
| FH | 21 | Lina Queyroi | (substituted in) 67' |
| FH | 22 | Lina Tuy | (substituted in) 67' |
| SH | 23 | Carla Neisen | (substituted in) 67' |
Coach:
Gaëlle Mignot & David Ortiz

| FB | 15 | Vittoria Ostuni Minuzzi | (substituted off) 65' |
| RW | 14 | Aura Muzzo |
| OC | 13 | Michela Sillari |
| IC | 12 | Sara Mannini |
| LW | 11 | Alyssa D'Inca |
| FH | 10 | Emma Stevanin | (substituted off) 71' |
| SH | 9 | Sofia Stefan | (substituted off) 57' |
| N8 | 8 | Elisa Giordano (c) |
| OF | 7 | Alissa Ranuccini | (substituted off) 47' |
| BF | 6 | Francesca Sgorbini |
| RL | 5 | Giordana Duca | | (substituted off) 65' |
| LL | 4 | Sara Tounesi | (substituted off) 53' | (substituted in) 65' |
| TP | 3 | Sara Seye | (substituted off) 59' |
| HK | 2 | Vittoria Vecchini | (substituted off) 67' |
| LP | 1 | Silvia Turani | (substituted off) 69' |
Replacements:
| HK | 16 | Desiree Spinelli | (substituted in) 67' |
| PR | 17 | Emanuela Stecca | (substituted in) 69' |
| PR | 18 | Gaia Maris | (substituted in) 59' |
| SR | 19 | Valeria Fedrighi | (substituted in) 53' |
| BR | 20 | Ilaria Arrighetti | (substituted in) 47' |
| SH | 21 | Alia Bitonci | (substituted in) 57' |
| FH | 22 | Veronica Madia | (substituted in) 71' |
| WG | 23 | Francesca Granzotto | (substituted in) 65' |
Coach:
Fabio Roselli

Player of the Match:
Gabrielle Vernier (France)

Assistant referees:
Natarsha Ganley (New Zealand)
Maria Heitor (Portugal)
Television match official:
Leo Colgan (Ireland)
Foul play review officer:
Rachel Horton (Australia)

=== South Africa vs Brazil ===
24 August 2025
14:45 BST (UTC+1)

| (1 BP) South Africa | 66–6 | Brazil |
| Try: Roos 3' c Hele (3) 8' m, 30' c, 43' c Malinga (2) 41' c, 75' c Janse van Rensburg (2) 48' c, 52' c Ngwevu 62' m Makua 79' c Con: Dolf (8/10) 4', 31', 42', 44', 49', 53', 76', 80' | Report | Pen: Kochhann (2/2) 10', 57' |

Franklin's Gardens, Northampton
Attendance: 13,053
Referee: Hollie Davidson (Scotland)

| FB | 15 | Byrhandré Dolf |
| RW | 14 | Maceala Samboya | (substituted off) 50' |
| OC | 13 | Zintle Mpupha |
| IC | 12 | Aphiwe Ngwevu |
| LW | 11 | Ayanda Malinga |
| FH | 10 | Libbie Janse van Rensburg |
| SH | 9 | Nadine Roos | (substituted off) 50' |
| N8 | 8 | Aseza Hele | (substituted off) 50' |
| OF | 7 | Sinazo Mcatshulwa |
| BF | 6 | Sizophila Solontsi | (substituted off) 50' |
| RL | 5 | Danelle Lochner |
| LL | 4 | Nolusindiso Booi (c) | (substituted off) 50' |
| TP | 3 | Babalwa Latsha | (substituted off) 50' |
| HK | 2 | Lindelwa Gwala | (substituted off) 50' |
| LP | 1 | Sanelisiwe Charlie | (substituted off) 50' |
Replacements:
| HK | 16 | Micke Günter | (substituted in) 50' |
| PR | 17 | Yonela Ngxingolo | (substituted in) 50' |
| PR | 18 | Nombuyekezo Mdliki | (substituted in) 50' |
| SR | 19 | Vainah Ubisi | (substituted in) 50' |
| BR | 20 | Lerato Makua | (substituted in) 50' |
| BR | 21 | Catha Jacobs | (substituted in) 50' |
| SH | 22 | Unam Tose | (substituted in) 50' |
| WG | 23 | Jakkie Cilliers | (substituted in) 50' |
Coach:
Swys de Bruin

| FB | 15 | Bianca Silva |
| RW | 14 | Giovanna Barth | (substituted off) 57' |
| OC | 13 | Marina Fioravanti |
| IC | 12 | Mariana Nicolau | (substituted off) 50' |
| LW | 11 | Edna Santini |
| FH | 10 | Raquel Kochhann |
| SH | 9 | Aline Bednarski | (substituted off) 62' |
| N8 | 8 | Camilla Ísis Carvalho |
| OF | 7 | Larissa Carvalho |
| BF | 6 | Larissa Henwood | (substituted off) 62' |
| RL | 5 | Marcelle Souza | (substituted off) 50' |
| LL | 4 | Eshyllen Coimbra (c) |
| TP | 3 | Taís Prioste | (substituted off) 66' |
| HK | 2 | Júlia Leni Lima | (substituted off) 62' |
| LP | 1 | Franciele Barros | (substituted off) 57' |
Replacements:
| HK | 16 | Isabela Gomes Saccomanno | (substituted in) 62' |
| PR | 17 | Samara Vergara | (substituted in) 57' |
| PR | 18 | Giovana Mamede | (substituted in) 66' |
| SR | 19 | Dayana Dakar | (substituted in) 62' |
| BR | 20 | Letícia Silva | (substituted in) 50' |
| SH | 21 | Luiza Campos | (substituted in) 62' |
| FH | 22 | Fernanda Tenório | (substituted in) 57' |
| WG | 23 | Isadora Lopes | (substituted in) 50' |
Coach:
Emiliano Caffera

Player of the Match:
Aphiwe Ngwevu (South Africa)

Assistant referees:
Holly Wood (England)
Jess Ling (Australia)
Television match official:
Ian Tempest (England)
Foul play review officer:
Rachel Horton (Australia)

Notes:

- This was Brazil's first ever match at a World Cup.

=== Italy vs South Africa ===
31 August 2025
15:30 BST (UTC+1)

| (2 BP) Italy | 24–29 | South Africa (1 BP) |
| Try: Ostuni Minuzzi 24' m Vecchini 34' c Sgorbini 47' m Seye 68' c Con: Sillari (1/2) 35'; Rigoni (1/2) 69' | Report | Try: Hele 2' m Roos 20' c Malinga 28' m Solontsi 55' c Mcatshulwa 74' m Con: Dolf (2/5) 21', 55' |

York Community Stadium, York
Attendance: 6,045
Referee: Ella Goldsmith (Australia)

| FB | 15 | Vittoria Ostuni Minuzzi | (substituted off) 70' |
| RW | 14 | Aura Muzzo |
| OC | 13 | Michela Sillari | (substituted off) 35' |
| IC | 12 | Beatrice Rigoni |
| LW | 11 | Alyssa D'Inca |
| FH | 10 | Emma Stevanin | (substituted off) 55' |
| SH | 9 | Sofia Stefan |
| N8 | 8 | Elisa Giordano (c) |
| OF | 7 | Beatrice Veronese | (substituted off) 64' |
| BF | 6 | Francesca Sgorbini |
| RL | 5 | Giordana Duca |
| LL | 4 | Sara Tounesi | (substituted off) 11' |
| TP | 3 | Sara Seye |
| HK | 2 | Vittoria Vecchini |
| LP | 1 | Silvia Turani | (substituted off) 11' | (substituted in) 25' |
Replacements:
| HK | 16 | Laura Gurioli |
| PR | 17 | Emanuela Stecca |
| PR | 18 | Gaia Maris | (substituted in) 11' | (substituted off) 25' |
| SR | 19 | Valeria Fedrighi | (substituted in) 11' |
| BR | 20 | Alissa Ranuccini | (substituted in) 64' |
| SH | 21 | Alia Bitonci | (substituted in) 55' |
| FH | 22 | Sara Mannini | (substituted in) 35' |
| WG | 23 | Francesca Granzotto | (substituted in) 70' |
Coach:
Fabio Roselli

| FB | 15 | Nadine Roos |
| RW | 14 | Byrhandré Dolf |
| OC | 13 | Zintle Mpupha |
| IC | 12 | Chumisa Qawe | (substituted off) 41' |
| LW | 11 | Ayanda Malinga |
| FH | 10 | Libbie Janse van Rensburg |
| SH | 9 | Unam Tose | (substituted off) 41' |
| N8 | 8 | Aseza Hele | (substituted off) 61' |
| OF | 7 | Sinazo Mcatshulwa |
| BF | 6 | Sizophila Solontsi | (substituted off) 70' |
| RL | 5 | Danelle Lochner |
| LL | 4 | Nolusindiso Booi (c) | (substituted off) 50' |
| TP | 3 | Babalwa Latsha | (substituted off) 71' |
| HK | 2 | Lindelwa Gwala | (substituted off) 70' |
| LP | 1 | Sanelisiwe Charlie | (substituted off) 50' |
Replacements:
| HK | 16 | Micke Günter | (substituted in) 70' |
| PR | 17 | Yonela Ngxingolo | (substituted in) 50' |
| PR | 18 | Nombuyekezo Mdliki | (substituted in) 71' |
| SR | 19 | Vainah Ubisi | (substituted in) 50' |
| BR | 20 | Lerato Makua | (substituted in) 70' |
| BR | 21 | Catha Jacobs | (substituted in) 61' |
| CE | 22 | Eloise Webb | (substituted in) 41' |
| CE | 23 | Aphiwe Ngwevu | (substituted in) 41' |
Coach:
Swys de Bruin

Player of the Match:
Libbie Janse van Rensburg (South Africa)

Assistant referees:
Precious Pazani (Zimbabwe)
Maria Heitor (Portugal)
Television match official:
Andrew McMenemy (Scotland)
Foul play review officer:
Ian Tempest (England)

Notes:

- This was South Africa's first ever win against Italy.
- Sofia Stefan became the third Italian player in history to earn 100 test caps.

=== France vs Brazil ===
31 August 2025
16:45 BST (UTC+1)

| (1 BP) France | 84–5 | Brazil |
| Try: Boulard (2) 5' c, 56' c Morland 7' c Bourdon Sansus 12' c Arbey (2) 16' m, 69' m Deshaye 22' m Menager (2) 27' m, 40' m Queyroi 32' m Okemba (2) 35' c, 43' m Konde 59' c Tuy 67' c Con: Queyroi (7/14) 6', 8', 13', 36', 57', 60', 67' | Report | Try: B. Silva 64' m |

Sandy Park, Exeter
Attendance: 13,902 (Note: This fixture was sold under a single ticket with the New Zealand vs Japan Pool C match. The recorded attendance corresponds to the France vs Brazil game.)
Referee: Natarsha Ganley (New Zealand)

| FB | 15 | Émilie Boulard |
| RW | 14 | Marine Ménager (c) | (substituted off) 51' |
| OC | 13 | Nassira Konde |
| IC | 12 | Gabrielle Vernier | (substituted off) 60' |
| LW | 11 | Kelly Arbey |
| FH | 10 | Lina Queyroi |
| SH | 9 | Pauline Bourdon Sansus | (substituted off) 68' |
| N8 | 8 | Marie Morland |
| OF | 7 | Léa Champon | (substituted off) 51' |
| BF | 6 | Séraphine Okemba |
| RL | 5 | Hina Ikahehegi | (substituted off) 60' |
| LL | 4 | Taïna Maka |
| TP | 3 | Rose Bernadou | (substituted off) 61' |
| HK | 2 | Agathe Gérin | (substituted off) 46' |
| LP | 1 | Annaëlle Deshayes | (substituted off) 46' |
Replacements:
| HK | 16 | Élisa Riffonneau | (substituted in) 46' |
| PR | 17 | Makarita Baleinadogo | (substituted in) 46' |
| PR | 18 | Assia Khalfaoui | (substituted in) 61' |
| BR | 19 | Axelle Berthoumieu | (substituted in) 60' |
| BR | 20 | Khoudedia Cissokho | (substituted in) 51' |
| SH | 21 | Alexandra Chambon | (substituted in) 68' |
| FH | 22 | Lina Tuy | (substituted in) 51' |
| CE | 23 | Carla Neisen | (substituted in) 60' |
Coach:
Gaëlle Mignot & David Ortiz

| FB | 15 | Fernanda Tenório |
| RW | 14 | Isadora Lopes |
| OC | 13 | Edna Santini |
| IC | 12 | Marina Fioravanti | (substituted off) 60' |
| LW | 11 | Yasmim Soares |
| FH | 10 | Maria Gabriela Graf | (substituted off) 47' |
| SH | 9 | Luiza Campos | (substituted off) 47' |
| N8 | 8 | Íris Coluna | (substituted off) 47' |
| OF | 7 | Larissa Carvalho |
| BF | 6 | Letícia Medeiros |
| RL | 5 | Letícia Silva | (substituted off) 10' |
| LL | 4 | Eshyllen Coimbra (c) |
| TP | 3 | Taís Prioste | (substituted off) 63' |
| HK | 2 | Isabela Gomes Saccomanno | (substituted off) 47' |
| LP | 1 | Samara Vergara | (substituted off) 47' |
Replacements:
| HK | 16 | Natália Jonck | (substituted in) 47' |
| PR | 17 | Franciele Barros | (substituted in) 47' |
| PR | 18 | Pâmela Santos | (substituted in) 63' |
| SR | 19 | Ana Carolina Santana | (substituted in) 10' |
| BR | 20 | Camilla Ísis Carvalho | (substituted in) 47' |
| SH | 21 | Leila Silva | (substituted in) 47' |
| CE | 22 | Carolyne Katrine Pereira | (substituted in) 47' |
| FB | 23 | Bianca Silva | (substituted in) 60' |
Coach:
Emiliano Caffera

Player of the Match:
Pauline Bourdon Sansus (France)

Assistant referees:
Holly Wood (England)
Amelia Luciano (United States)
Television match official:
Rachel Horton (Australia)
Foul play review officer:
Quinton Immelman (South Africa)

=== Italy vs Brazil ===
7 September 2025
14:00 BST (UTC+1)

| (1 BP) Italy | 64–3 | Brazil |
| Try: Mannini 13' m Fedrighi 17' m Granzotto (3) 20' m, 41' m, 78' c Ostuni Minuzzi (3) 23' m, 25' m, 60' m Corradini 49' c Buso (2) 73' m, 75' m Stefan 80' m Con: Bitonci (1/7) 50'; Granzotto (1/5) 79' | Report | Pen: Kochhann (1/1) 8' |

Franklin's Gardens, Northampton
Attendance: 13,268
Referee: Maggie Cogger-Orr (New Zealand)

| FB | 15 | Vittoria Ostuni Minuzzi |
| RW | 14 | Aura Muzzo | (substituted off) 51' |
| OC | 13 | Giada Corradini |
| IC | 12 | Sara Mannini |
| LW | 11 | Francesca Granzotto |
| FH | 10 | Veronica Madia | (substituted off) 61' |
| SH | 9 | Alia Bitonci | (substituted off) 65' |
| N8 | 8 | Elisa Giordano (c) |
| OF | 7 | Isabella Locatelli |
| BF | 6 | Francesca Sgorbini | (substituted off) 51' |
| RL | 5 | Alessandra Frangipani |
| LL | 4 | Valeria Fedrighi | (substituted off) 55' |
| TP | 3 | Sara Seye | (substituted off) 40' |
| HK | 2 | Vittoria Vecchini | (substituted off) 42' |
| LP | 1 | Gaia Maris | (substituted off) 44' |
Replacements:
| HK | 16 | Laura Gurioli | (substituted in) 42' |
| PR | 17 | Silvia Turani | (substituted in) 44' |
| PR | 18 | Alessia Pilani | (substituted in) 40' |
| BR | 19 | Beatrice Veronese | (substituted in) 55' |
| BR | 20 | Alissa Ranuccini | (substituted in) 51' |
| SH | 21 | Sofia Stefan | (substituted in) 65' |
| FH | 22 | Emma Stevanin | (substituted in) 61' |
| CE | 23 | Gaia Buso | (substituted in) 51' |
Coach:
Fabio Roselli

| FB | 15 | Fernanda Tenório |
| RW | 14 | Giovanna Barth |
| OC | 13 | Marina Fioravanti | | (substituted off) 48' |
| IC | 12 | Mariana Nicolau |
| LW | 11 | Bianca Silva |
| FH | 10 | Raquel Kochhann |
| SH | 9 | Aline Bednarski | | (substituted off) 48' |
| N8 | 8 | Camilla Ísis Carvalho | | (substituted off) 21' | (substituted in) 34' | | (substituted off) 69' |
| OF | 7 | Larissa Carvalho | | | | (substituted off) 61' | (substituted in) 69' |
| BF | 6 | Larissa Henwood |
| RL | 5 | Dayana Dakar | | (substituted off) 41' |
| LL | 4 | Eshyllen Coimbra (c) | | (substituted off) 61' |
| TP | 3 | Pâmela Santos | | (substituted off) 41' |
| HK | 2 | Júlia Leni Lima | | (substituted off) 61' |
| LP | 1 | Franciele Barros | | (substituted off) 48' |
Replacements:
| HK | 16 | Isabela Gomes Saccomanno | | (substituted in) 61' |
| PR | 17 | Taís Prioste | (yellow card) 73' | (substituted in) 61' |
| PR | 18 | Giovana Mamede | | (substituted in) 41' |
| BR | 19 | Marcelle Souza | | (substituted in) 41' |
| SR | 20 | Ana Carolina Santana | | (substituted in) 61' |
| BR | 21 | Letícia Medeiros | | (substituted in) 21' | (substituted off) 34' | (substituted in) 61' |
| SH | 22 | Leila Cássia Silva | | (substituted in) 48' |
| CE | 23 | Edna Santini | | (substituted in) 48' |
Coach:
Emiliano Caffera

Player of the Match:
Isabella Locatelli (Italy)

Assistant referees:
Ella Goldsmith (Australia)
Maria Heitor (Portugal)
Television match official:
Andrew McMenemy (Scotland)
Foul play review officer:
Leo Colgan (Ireland)

=== France vs South Africa ===
7 September 2025
16:45 BST (UTC+1)

| (1 BP) France | 57–10 | South Africa |
| Try: Boulard (2) 9' m, 43' c Vernier 19' c Escudero 26' c Gérin 37' m Grisez (2) 51' m, 75' c Deshayes 61' c Chambon 79' c Con: Queyroi (2/4) 20', 27'; Bourgeois (4/5) 44', 62', 76', 80' | Report | Try: Roos 80+1' c Con: Dolf (1/1) 80+2'; Pen: Dolf (1/1) 14' |

Franklin's Gardens, Northampton
Attendance: 13,268
Referee: Clara Munarini (Italy)

| FB | 15 | Émilie Boulard |
| RW | 14 | Joanna Grisez |
| OC | 13 | Nassira Konde |
| IC | 12 | Gabrielle Vernier |
| LW | 11 | Marine Ménager (cc) | (substituted off) 41' |
| FH | 10 | Lina Queyroi |
| SH | 9 | Pauline Bourdon Sansus | (substituted off) 62' |
| N8 | 8 | Charlotte Escudero |
| OF | 7 | Léa Champon | (substituted off) 66' |
| BF | 6 | Axelle Berthoumieu |
| RL | 5 | Madoussou Fall Raclot | (substituted off) 56' |
| LL | 4 | Manaé Feleu (cc) | (substituted off) 56' |
| TP | 3 | Rose Bernadou | (substituted off) 53' |
| HK | 2 | Agathe Gérin | (substituted off) 53' |
| LP | 1 | Yllana Brosseau | (substituted off) 53' |
Replacements:
| HK | 16 | Élisa Riffonneau | (substituted in) 53' |
| PR | 17 | Annaëlle Deshayes | (substituted in) 53' |
| PR | 18 | Assia Khalfaoui | (substituted in) 53' |
| SR | 19 | Hina Ikahehegi | (substituted in) 56' |
| BR | 20 | Taïna Maka | (substituted in) 56' |
| BR | 21 | Séraphine Okemba | (substituted in) 66' |
| SH | 22 | Alexandra Chambon | (substituted in) 62' |
| FB | 23 | Morgane Bourgeois | (substituted in) 41' |
Coach:
Gaëlle Mignot & David Ortiz

| FB | 15 | Byrhandré Dolf |
| RW | 14 | Jakkie Cilliers |
| OC | 13 | Eloise Webb |
| IC | 12 | Chumisa Qawe | (red card) 25' |
| LW | 11 | Maceala Samboya |
| FH | 10 | Mary Zulu | | (substituted off) 45' |
| SH | 9 | Nadine Roos |
| N8 | 8 | Aseza Hele | | (substituted off) 45' |
| OF | 7 | Catha Jacobs |
| BF | 6 | Lerato Makua | | (substituted off) 45' |
| RL | 5 | Anathi Qolo |
| LL | 4 | Vainah Ubisi | | (substituted off) 45' |
| TP | 3 | Babalwa Latsha (c) | | (substituted off) 45' |
| HK | 2 | Micke Günter | | (substituted off) 45' |
| LP | 1 | Yonela Ngxingolo | | (substituted off) 38' |
Replacements:
| HK | 16 | Luchell Hanekom | | (substituted in) 45' |
| PR | 17 | Xoliswa Khuzwayo | | (substituted in) 38' |
| PR | 18 | Nombuyekezo Mdliki | | (substituted in) 45' |
| SR | 19 | Nomsa Mokwai | | (substituted in) 45' |
| BR | 20 | Faith Tshauke | | (substituted in) 45' |
| BR | 21 | Sinazo Mcatshulwa | | (substituted in) 45' |
| SH | 22 | Tayla Kinsey | | (substituted in) 45' |
| CE | 23 | Aphiwe Ngwevu | | (substituted in) 45' |
Coach:
Swys de Bruin

Player of the Match:
Pauline Bourdon Sansus (France)

Assistant referees:
Lauren Jenner (Italy)
Jess Ling (Australia)
Television match official:
Rachel Horton (Australia)
Foul play review officer:
Leo Colgan (Ireland)
