= List of Brazil women's national rugby union team matches =

The following is a list of Brazil women's national rugby union team international matches.

== Overall ==
Brazil's overall international match record against all nations, updated to 7 September 2025, is as follows:

	Games Played	Won	Drawn	Lost	Win %
Total	20	5	0	15	25%

== Full internationals ==
=== Legend ===
Won	Lost	Draw

=== 2008 & 2019 ===
Test	Date	Opponent	PF	PA	Venue	Event
1	10 May 2008	Netherlands	0	10	Amsterdam, Netherlands	First international
2	25 August 2019	Colombia	7	28	Medellín, Colombia	Test match

=== 2020s ===
Test	Date	Opponent	PF	PA	Venue	Event
3	9 March 2020	Colombia	19	23	Medellín	
4	12 November 2022	Colombia	17	25	Estádio Nogueirão, Mogi das Cruzes	
5	11 June 2023	Colombia	15	18	Estadio Eurico Gaspar Dutrinha, Cuiabá	2023 ART
6	5 July 2023	Colombia	23	24	Medellín	
7	9 July 2023	Colombia	19	30	Medellín	
8	21 November 2023	Portugal	10	7	SESI Guarulhos, São Paulo	
9	25 November 2023	Portugal	5	13	SESI Guarulhos, São Paulo	
10	29 June 2024	Colombia	34	13	Estadio Héroes de Curupayty, Luque	2025 RWC Qualifier
11	29 November 2024	Netherlands	7	15	National Rugby Center, Amsterdam	Test
12	5 December 2024	Netherlands	15	17	National Rugby Center, Amsterdam	Test
13	16 March 2025	Portugal	19	12	Complexo Desportivo Municipal, Caldas da Rainha	Test
14	22 March 2025	Spain	12	41	Estadio Nelson Mandela, Torrevieja	Test
15	14 June 2025	Colombia	58	7	Estádio Nicolau Alayon, São Paulo	2025 World Cup Warm-Ups
16	12 July 2025	Netherlands	5	33	Estádio Municipal Du Cambusano, Jacareí	2025 World Cup Warm-Ups
17	19 July 2025	Netherlands	22	0	Estádio Nicolau Alayon, São Paulo	2025 World Cup Warm-Ups
18	24 August 2025	South Africa	6	66	Franklin's Gardens, Northampton	2025 World Cup
19	31 August 2025	France	5	84	Sandy Park, Exeter	2025 World Cup
20	7 September 2025	Italy	3	64	Franklin's Gardens, Northampton	2025 World Cup

== Other matches ==
Date	Brazil	Score	Opponent	Venue	Event	Ref
2023-06-03	Brazil	15–15	United States U23	Estádio Nicolau Alayon, São Paulo	2023 ART	
2024-06-11	Brazil	19–12	USA Falcons	São Paulo Athletic Club	2024 South America Tour	
2024-06-14	Brazil	21–12	USA Falcons	São Paulo Athletic Club	2024 South America Tour	
