= List of Colombia women's national rugby union team matches =

The following is a list of Colombia women's national rugby union team international matches.

== Overall ==
Colombia's overall international match record against all nations, updated to 8 November 2025, is as follows:

	Games Played	Won	Drawn	Lost	Win %
Total	17	10	0	7	58.82%

See Women's international rugby for information about the status of international games and match numbering

== Full internationals ==
=== Legend ===
Won	Lost	Draw

=== 2019 ===
Test	Date	Opponent	PF	PA	Venue	Event
1	25 August 2019	Brazil	28	7	Medellín	Test match

=== 2020s ===
Test	Date	Opponent	PF	PA	Venue	Tournament	Ref
2	7 March 2020	Brazil	23	19	Medellín		
3	25 August 2021	Kenya	16	15	Nyayo National Stadium, Nairobi	RWCQ	
4	19 February 2022	Kazakhstan	18	10	The Sevens Stadium, Dubai	RWCQ	
5	25 February 2022	Scotland	3	59	The Sevens Stadium, Dubai	RWCQ	
6	12 November 2022	Brazil	25	17	Estádio Nogueirão, Mogi das Cruzes		
7	11 June 2023	Brazil	18	15	Estadio Presidente Eurico Gaspar Dutrinha	2023 ART	
8	5 July 2023	Brazil	24	23	Medellín	WXVQ	
9	9 July 2023	Brazil	30	19	Medellín	WXVQ	
10	13 October 2023	Fiji	13	67	The Sevens Stadium, Dubai	2023 WXV 3	
11	21 October 2023	Ireland	3	64	The Sevens Stadium, Dubai	2023 WXV 3	
12	27 October 2023	Kenya	5	21	The Sevens Stadium, Dubai	2023 WXV 3	
13	16 March 2024	Netherlands	11	33	National Rugby Center, Amsterdam	WXV relegation play-off	
14	15 June 2024	Trinidad & Tobago	96	0	Estadio Cincuentenario, Medellín	Test match	
15	29 June 2024	Brazil	13	34	Estadio Héroes de Curupayty, Luque	2025 RWC Qualifier	
16	14 June 2025	Brazil	7	58	Estádio Nicolau Alayon, São Paulo	Test match	
17	8 November 2025	Mexico	65	5	Estadio Cincuentenario, Medellin	Test match	

== Other matches ==
Date	Colombia	Score	Opponent	Venue	Note
21 November 2014	Colombia Development XV	30–0	Venezuela	San Cristobal, Venezuela	
23 November 2014	Colombia Development XV	25–5	Venezuela	San Cristobal, Venezuela	
7 June 2023	Colombia	24–27	United States U23	Estádio Nogueirão, Mogi das Cruzes	2023 ART
