= Ōpōtiki College =

Location
- 22 St John Street, Ōpōtiki 3122; Ōpōtiki; New Zealand; 38.0133°S 177.2884°E

Information
- Type: State co-educational secondary, years 9–13
- Motto: Te Hinengaro Te Tohu (The mind is the measure of the man)
- Established: 1953
- Status: Open
- Ministry of Education Institution no.: 148
- Principal: Mrs Terehia Channings
- Age range: 13–18
- Enrolment: 350 (July 2026)
- Socio-economic decile: 2D
- Website: opotikicol.school.nz

Ōpōtiki College is a state secondary school located in Ōpōtiki, in the Bay of Plenty, North Island, New Zealand.

== History ==
The first secondary schooling available in Ōpōtiki was at the Opotiki District High School, which was established in 1922. The name was changed in 1953 when Ōpōtiki College opened as a separate secondary school (on its present site).

When Ōpōtiki College came into being in 1953, a new crest was decided on. At the top is a burning lamp. Underneath is a cogged wheel and key. The fern and the mere were added later.

The first motto was in Latin – UT MENS ITA HOMO; “as the mind is, so is the man”. This was later changed to te reo Māori – TE HINENGARO TE TOHU; meaning “The mind is the measure of the man”.

A new logo has recently been developed that has at its centre the Koru.

== Kura Ki Uta ==
The school marae (Maori communal space) was opened in 1981, complete with a dedicated meeting house or wharenui, given the name Kura Ki Uta. The school kapa haka roopu (Māori Performing Arts team) has taken this name too. The wharenui building burned down accidentally in 2014. The reconstructed wharenui was rededicated in 2016. The photographs of the House Leaders that had been on display in the original wharenui were saved from the fire, but the original tukutuku panels (latticework used to decorate meeting houses) were lost. The carvings on the outside were restored; the original carvings from 1981 had already been replaced. The new maihe {front facing barge boards} represent the local tribes (iwi), Whakatōhea, Tūhoe, Ngāitai and Te Whānau-ā-Apanui. The twelve heavens and ten Atua (gods) are represented on each sidearm and the centre piece, representative of Io, the Supreme being, has representations of the three baskets (kete) of knowledge in Maori tradition (Te Kete Aronui, Te kete Tuauri, and Te Kete Tuatea), the influence of the Church and the influence of Maoridom. School functions are held on the marae ātea, the open space in front of the meeting house, including formal pōwhiri (Māori welcoming ceremony) for guests, orientation for new students and celebrations of student successes.

== School houses ==
The traditional school house names cover a range of representatives in domains including sports, academics, science, literature, politics, Ngāti Porou, the rainbow community, a Nobel Prize winner, and a Victoria Cross winner.

- Freyberg House, named for Lieutenant General Bernard Freyberg
- Ngata House, named for Sir Āpirana Ngata
- Mansfield House, named for Katherine Mansfield
- Rutherford House, named for Lord Ernest Rutherford

== Notable alumni ==
- Ken Carrington, All Black
- Dylan "DJ" Collier, Olympian (2021, Sevens), NZ Sevens, 2018 Commonwealth Games Gold Medalist
- Luka Connor, Black Fern
- Exia Shelford, Black Fern
- Kate Henwood, Black Fern
- Sam Henwood, Māori All Black
- Murray Hudson recipient of the George Cross
- James Rolleston, actor
- Frank Shelford, All Black, Māori All Black
- Nikki Slade Robinson, author
- Leanne Walker, Olympian, (Basketball) and NZ touch
- William Walker, Māori All Black
- Marilynn Webb, artist
