= Eshyllen Coimbra =

Brazil international rugby union player

- Born: 18 August 2000 (age 26) Rio de Janeiro, Brazil
- Height: 176 cm (5 ft 9 in)
- Weight: 73 kg (161 lb; 11 st 7 lb)

Rugby union career
- Position: Lock
Senior career
Years	Team	Apps	(Points)
	Elshaddai		(0)
International career
Years	Team	Apps	(Points)
2020–	Brazil	17	(10)
- Correct as of 16 August 2025
National sevens team
Years	Team		Comps
2018–	Brazil		

Eshyllen Coimbra Cardoso (born 18 August 2000) is a Brazilian rugby union player.

== Early career ==
Coimbra was reluctant to play rugby in the beginning and always turned down her friends invitations to try the sport out. She was an avid volleyball player as a youngster, after playing her first game of rugby, she got to like the sport and started going every week. She became serious with the game when she was inspired by the Brazilian national teams playing in the 2016 Olympic Games.

== Rugby career ==
=== Sevens ===
Coimbra made her international rugby sevens debut for the Brazil women's sevens team in the 2018 Canada leg of the Sevens Series.

=== Fifteens ===
She made her international debut for Brazil in March 2020 in a 19–23 loss against Columbia

In 2024, she was part of theBrazilian side that beat Colombia in their World Cup qualification match to secure a spot in the 2025 Women's Rugby World Cup. She scored a try in their 34–13 win in Luque, Paraguay.

In July 2025, she was named in the Brazilian squad for the 2025 Women's Rugby World Cup in England by head coach Emiliano Caffera. She will captain the team in the tournament.
