= Sam Henwood =

NZ Maori international rugby union player

- Full name: Samuel Tamihana Henwood
- Born: 28 March 1991 (age 35) Ōpōtiki, New Zealand
- Height: 1.86 m (6 ft 1 in)
- Weight: 107 kg (16 st 12 lb; 236 lb)
- School: Opotiki College, King's College, Auckland
- University: Auckland University of Technology
- Notable relative(s): Brian Brown; Kate Henwood (sister)

Rugby union career
- Position(s): Number 8, Flanker
- Current team: Kamaishi Seawaves
Senior career
Years	Team	Apps	(Points)
2011–12	Auckland	1	(0)
2014–16	CR Tecnico	25	(115)
2014–2019	Counties Manukau	32	(35)
2016	Chiefs	2	(0)
2018–2019	Hurricanes	10	(0)
2020	NEC Green Rockets	6	(10)
2021–	Kamaishi Seawaves	58	(110)
- Correct as of 21 February 2021
International career
Years	Team	Apps	(Points)
2011	New Zealand Universities	2	(0)
2017	Māori All Blacks	1	(0)
- Correct as of 21 February 2021

Samuel Tamihana Henwood (born 28 March 1991) is a New Zealand rugby union player. He is nephew of Brian Brown, notable figure in the underbelly of the far north of NZ. He currently plays for the Hurricanes in Super Rugby and Counties Manukau in New Zealand's domestic Mitre 10 Cup.

== Early career ==
Born and raised in the small town of Opotiki in the Bay of Plenty region of New Zealand, Henwood initially turned out for the Bay's youth sides alongside future All Black, Sam Cane. He attended Opotiki College for four years, then moved to Auckland for his final year of high school and attended King's College where he captained their first XV.

== Senior career ==
Henwood debuted for Auckland during the 2011 ITM Cup season, however over the next few years he suffered multiple shoulder injuries which required reconstruction ending two of his seasons prematurely. He made his return to the National Provincial Competition in 2014, playing for the Counties Manukau Steelers. During the 2014–2015 and 2015–2016 off-seasons, he played in Portugal for Clube de Tecnico who were coached by his former Counties Manukau teammate, Kane Hancy.

His second stint in Portugal was cut short when a season-ending injury to Mitchell Karpik left a spot open on the Chiefs Super Rugby roster, so he headed to Hamilton and made his super rugby debut in a match against the Force. Overall he managed 2 appearances during the season.

== Personal ==
His wife, Larissa Henwood, played for Brazil in the 2025 Women's Rugby World Cup. His sister, Kate Henwood, plays for the Black Ferns.
