= Letícia Medeiros =

Brazil international rugby league & union player

- Born: 19 December 1994 (age 31)
- Height: 177 cm (5 ft 10 in)

Rugby union career
- Position: Back row
Senior career
Years	Team	Apps	(Points)
	Jacareí		(0)
International career
Years	Team	Apps	(Points)
2019–	Brazil	11	(0)
- Rugby league career

Playing information
Representative
Years	Team	Pld	T	G	FG	P
2021	Brazil	3	0	0	0	0

Letícia Medeiros (born 19 December 1994) is a Brazilian rugby union player. She competed for Brazil's rugby league team at the delayed 2021 Women's Rugby League World Cup. She also represented Brazil in the 2025 Women's Rugby World Cup.

== Early career ==
Medeiros is considered one of the pioneers of Jacareí Rugby. She tried out other sports before she started playing rugby union in 2010, at age 15.

== Rugby union career ==
Medeiros was named Outstanding Women's Rugby Player for a third time by the Jacareí City Council in 2019. She made her international debut for Brazil against Colombia on 25 August 2019 in Medellín, Colombia. In December that year, she travelled to New Zealand and spent 45 days training with the Brazilian Rugby Team.

In 2020, she was called up to the Brazilian fifteens team to compete in the 2021 Rugby World Cup qualifiers. She plays club rugby for Jacareí. She has also played for Melina and for Bond University in Australia.

In July 2025, she was named in the Brazilian squad for the 2025 Women's Rugby World Cup in England. In the pool game against France, her line-out steal led to her teammate, Bianca Silva, scoring their first-ever World Cup try.

== Rugby league career ==
Medeiros competed for Brazil at the delayed 2021 Women's Rugby League World Cup in England. She featured in Brazil's opening match against England.
