= Marina Fioravanti =

Brazilian rugby sevens player

- Born: 6 October 1993 (age 33)
- Height: 1.69 m (5 ft 7 in)
- Weight: 66 kg (146 lb)

Rugby union career
- Position: Fly-half
Senior career
Years	Team	Apps	(Points)
	Poli		(0)
International career
Years	Team	Apps	(Points)
2023–	Brazil	9	(0)
National sevens team
Years	Team		Comps
2020–	Brazil		

Marina Fioravanti Costa (born 6 October 1993) is a Brazilian rugby union player. She competed in the women's tournament at the 2020 Summer Olympics.

== Rugby career ==
Fioravanti represented Brazil at the 2022 Rugby World Cup Sevens in Cape Town, they placed eleventh overall.

In July 2023, she was named in Brazil's fifteens team to play Colombia for a spot in the inaugural WXV competition. She started in the first of two games against Colombia, her side narrowly lost 23–24.

She was named in the Brazilian women's sevens team that competed at the 2024 Summer Olympics in Paris.

In July 2025, she was named in Brazil's squad for the Women's Rugby World Cup in England.
