= Franklin's Gardens =

Rugby union venue in Northampton, England

Coordinates: 52°14′22″N 0°55′11″W

DPD Stadium at Franklin's Gardens
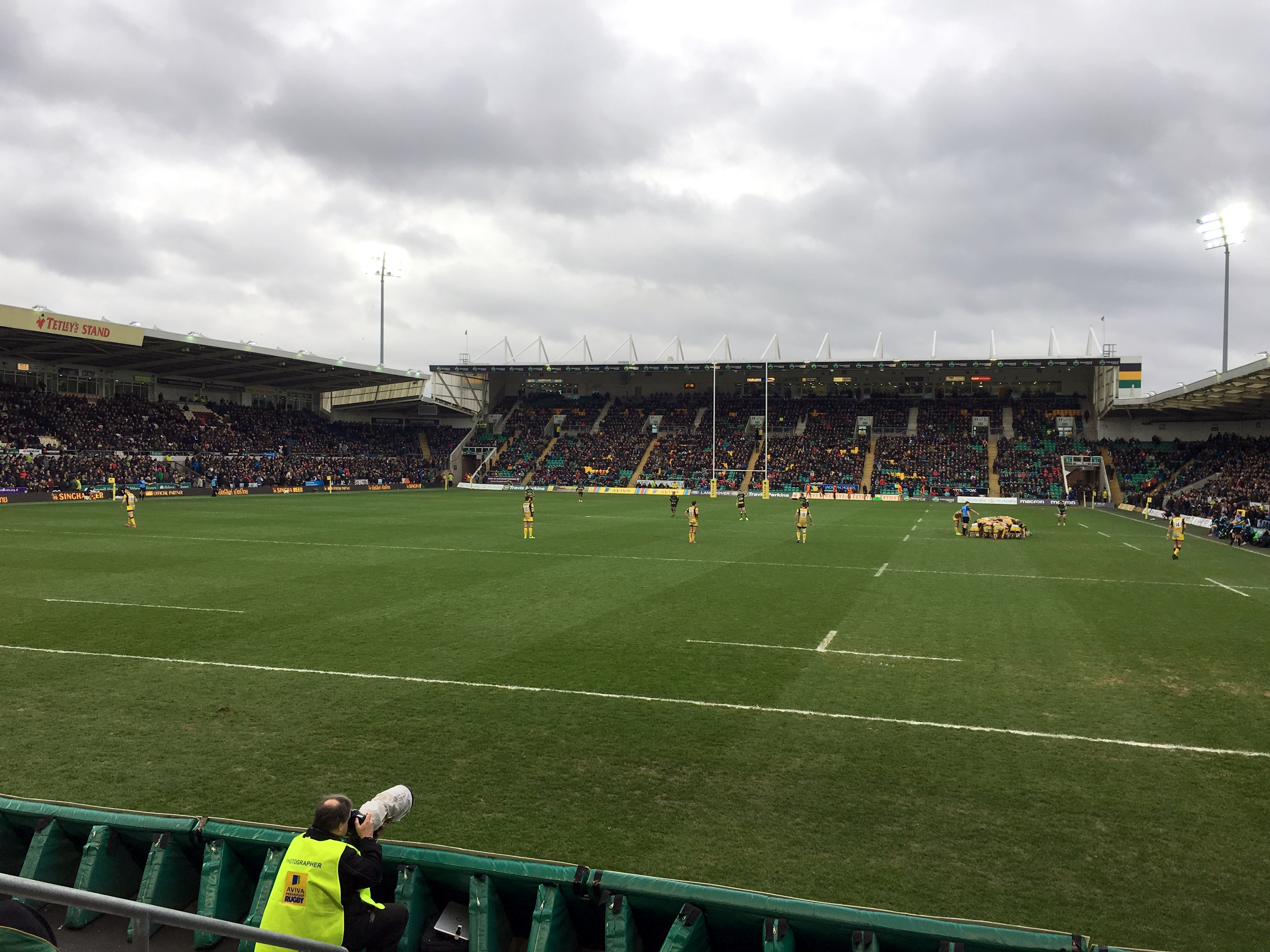
- Franklin's Gardens ground, 2017
- Interactive map of DPD Stadium at Franklin's Gardens
- Location: Weedon Road; St James; Northampton, England; NN5 5BG
- Owner: Northampton Saints Plc.
- Capacity: 15,249
- Surface: Grass
- Public transit: Northampton

Construction
- Groundbreaking: c.1880
- Renovated: 1897, c.1947, 1966, c.1990, 2001, 2005, 2015
- Cost: £10,000,000

Tenants
- Northampton Saints (1888–present); Loughborough Lightning (2023-present)

Website
- www.franklinsgardens.co.uk

Franklin's Gardens (currently known for sponsorship purposes as DPD Stadium at Franklin's Gardens) is a purpose-built rugby stadium in Northampton, England. It is the home stadium of Northampton Saints and Loughborough Lightning. The stadium holds 15,249 people. It is also a conference, meeting, and events venue, as well as the only Premiership Rugby ground with its own cenotaph, the setting for a ceremony every Remembrance Weekend.

== History ==
The Gardens, originally known as Melbourne Gardens, were created by John Collier, and opened in 1864. After his death in 1885, they were bought in 1886 by John Franklin, a successful hotelier, who renamed them Franklin's Gardens the following year.

In 1888, the Gardens were sold for £17,000 to the Northampton Brewery Company, which started making extensive improvements. New features included a running track, bicycle track, cricket ground, swimming pool, bear pit, a large ornamental lake, an improved monkey house, and a larger zoological garden.

Franklin's Gardens was described as the "Champs Elysees of Northampton" and trams ran from the town centre every few minutes, the fare being one penny. Home matches began in Abbey fields, next door to Franklin's Gardens, and it wasn't until the late 1880s that the Saints moved to Franklin's Gardens.

At the end of the 1896/97 season, a new stand, 45 feet (14 m) long and costing £45 5s, was built by A. Dunham's building company. It was carpeted, and reserved for members paying 10s 6d for season tickets.

On 9 October 1920, a two-page advertisement appeared in the Independent offering 15,000 shares in a new company, Franklin's Gardens Sports and Pleasure Co Ltd. The company prospectus proposed to turn the site into a sports complex, allowing the Saints to play at the Gardens in return for a percentage of the gate.

During the Second World War Franklin's Gardens was used for livestock. However, that didn't last long, because there was a new-look Franklin's Gardens in, with its £6,000 Member's stand.

The 1966/67 season began with the opening of the Peter Haddon-designed Sturtridge Pavilion, marked by a floodlit game between the Saints and an R E G Jeeps XV. Originally, the pavilion was designed with a vacant terraced ground floor to allow supporters to watch games from there but, in the end, an indoor conference and dining room was preferred.

During the 1976/77 season, the club acquired a 4-acre (1.6 ha) training pitch at the back of the ground on a 60-year lease and, in November 1977, the committee pulled off its biggest coup by buying Franklin's Gardens outright for £30,000.

When the leagues began in 1987, ground capacity was stated to be 6,000 - 2,000 seated and 4,000 standing.

During the 1990s, a number of temporary stands increased the spectator capacity up to 10,000 by 1998. In 2001, the stadium underwent a complete re-build. Fans got their first look at the £6 million new-look Franklin's Gardens on 8 September 2001.

The Tetley's and South stands were opened formally by Ian McGeechan, and the horseshoe stadium was completed in summer 2002 with the building of the Church's Stand, opened by five Saints legends. But there was more development to come. In 2005, an extension to the South Stand became a further piece of the Franklin's Gardens jigsaw.

The north stand was re-developed in the summer of 2015, which included the demolition of the old Sturtridge Pavilion and the construction of the new Barwell Stand, marking the end of the original re-build plans.

In September 2021, Saints announced a six-year naming rights deal with "cinch", an online used car dealer, which saw the stadium renamed "cinch Stadium at Franklin's Gardens".

== Structure and facilities ==
=== Stadium bowl and stands ===
The stadium bowl was constructed over a roughly 14-year period from 2001 to 2015, with the majority of the work on the bowl being undertaken from 2001 to 2005. Previously, the ground had a combination of permanent and semi-permanent stands surrounding the pitch, as well as the Sturtridge Pavilion to the north.

==== Carlsberg Stand ====
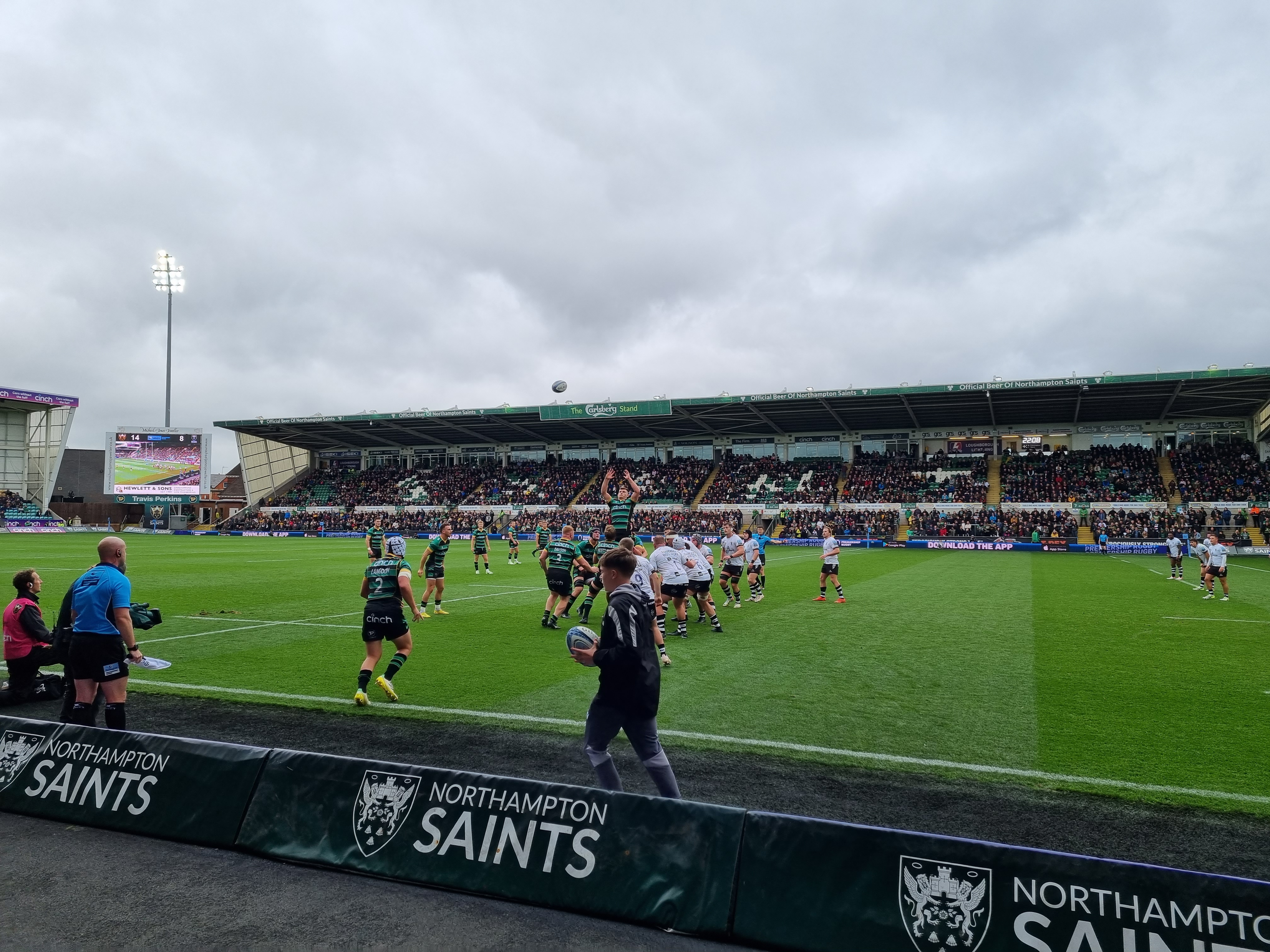
The Carlsberg Stand as seen from the Church's Stand, 2023

The Carlsberg Stand was constructed between April and September 2001, in order for it to be constructed, Saints demolished both the old terrace, as well as the Ritzy bar which previously stood where the current members car park lies.

The stand holds 6,000 (est) people, and has 19 executive boxes. Originally named the Tetley's Stand. The stand's capacity is split between the lower new Gordon Terrace and the upper seated area. Unlike premier league football stadiums, standing is allowed at rugby stadiums and the terracing was included as a specific part of the design. All of the people in the stand are under cover.

The Carlsberg Stand also includes the club's major conferencing facilities, including the Rodber Suite, Captains' Suite and Heroes' Bar. There is full wireless internet access throughout the stand. Facilities including all the bars and suites were refurbished to simulate the look and feel of the members' bar located in the Barwell Stand in 2016. In total the stand's conference facilities have a capacity of 920.

In November 2017, it was announced that through a continuation of the sponsorship from Carlsberg, the stand would be re-branded as "The Carlsberg Stand", which was completed in July 2018.

==== The Cinch Stand ====
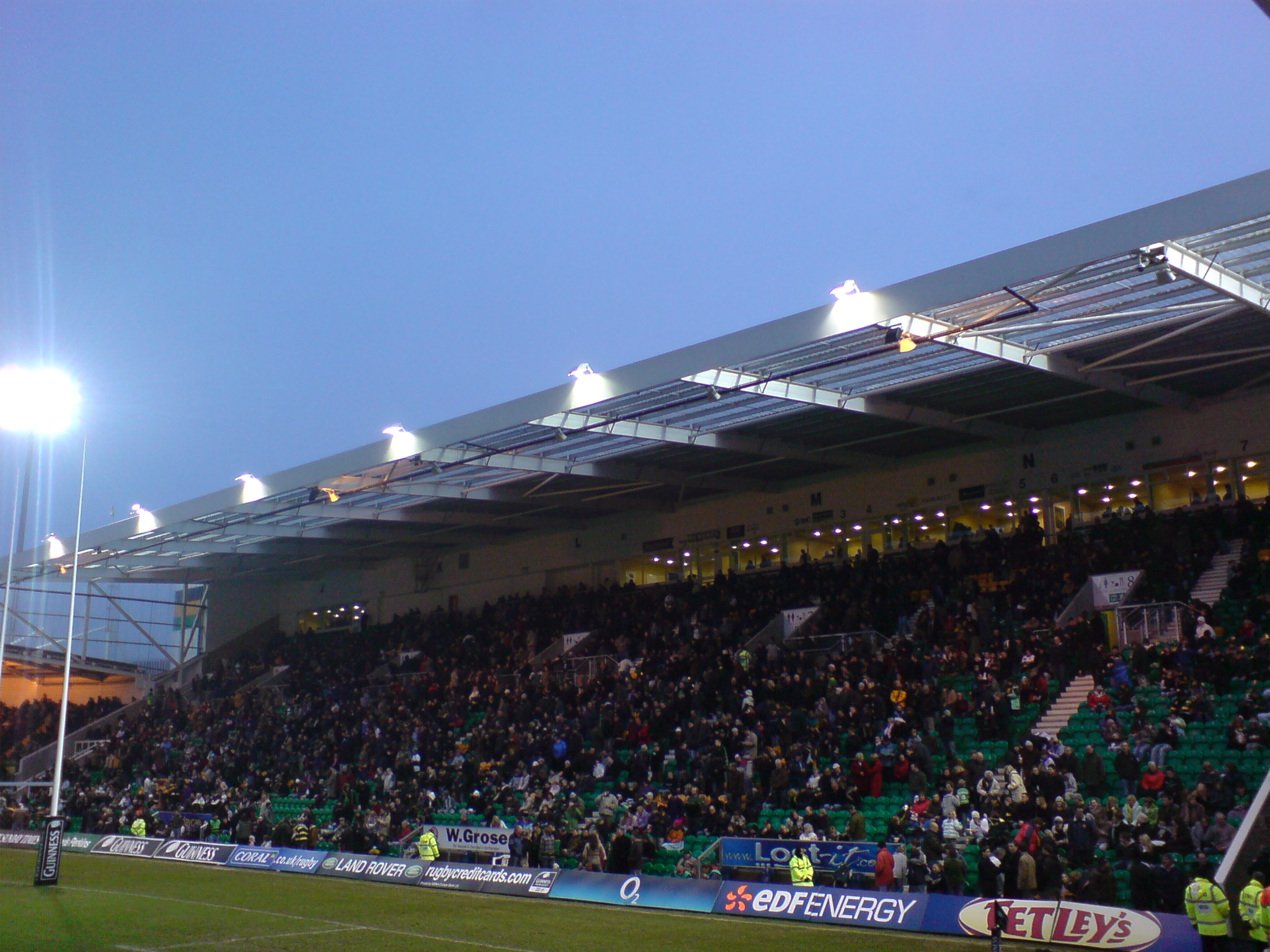
The cinch Stand (formerly The Burrda Stand and Elite Insurance Stand), 2007

In 2005, the South Stand was doubled in size, raising the spectator capacity of the Gardens from 12,100 to 13,591. The redevelopment involved extending the South Stand over the lake in the village area of the ground to make room for additional seating, seven new boxes, a premium members' club, another bar, and extra toilet facilities. The South stand extension was finished in the 2005/2006 season. At the start of the 2010/2011 season, it was announced that the South stand would be renamed the Burrda Stand, after the club's new kit supplier. In 2016, the stand was renamed the Elite Insurance Stand, but that ended in 2018. It has been known as the Cinch Stand since 26 December 2020.

==== The Church's Stand ====
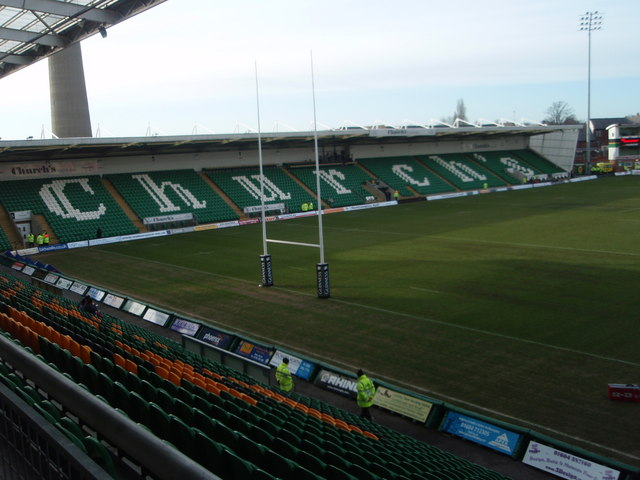
The Church's Stand, 2009

The Church's Stand is the third all-seater stand. It completed the horseshoe in the summer of 2002, and was opened in November 2002 by five club legends: former captains Ron Jacobs, Don White, Gary Pearce, David Powell and Vince Cannon.

The stand replaced the old Members' Stand which had lasted since the 1920s. It contained both the home and away dressing rooms, TV camera gantry, press bench, press room and a cinema for Saint's players (this was a bar until the Barwell Stand development).

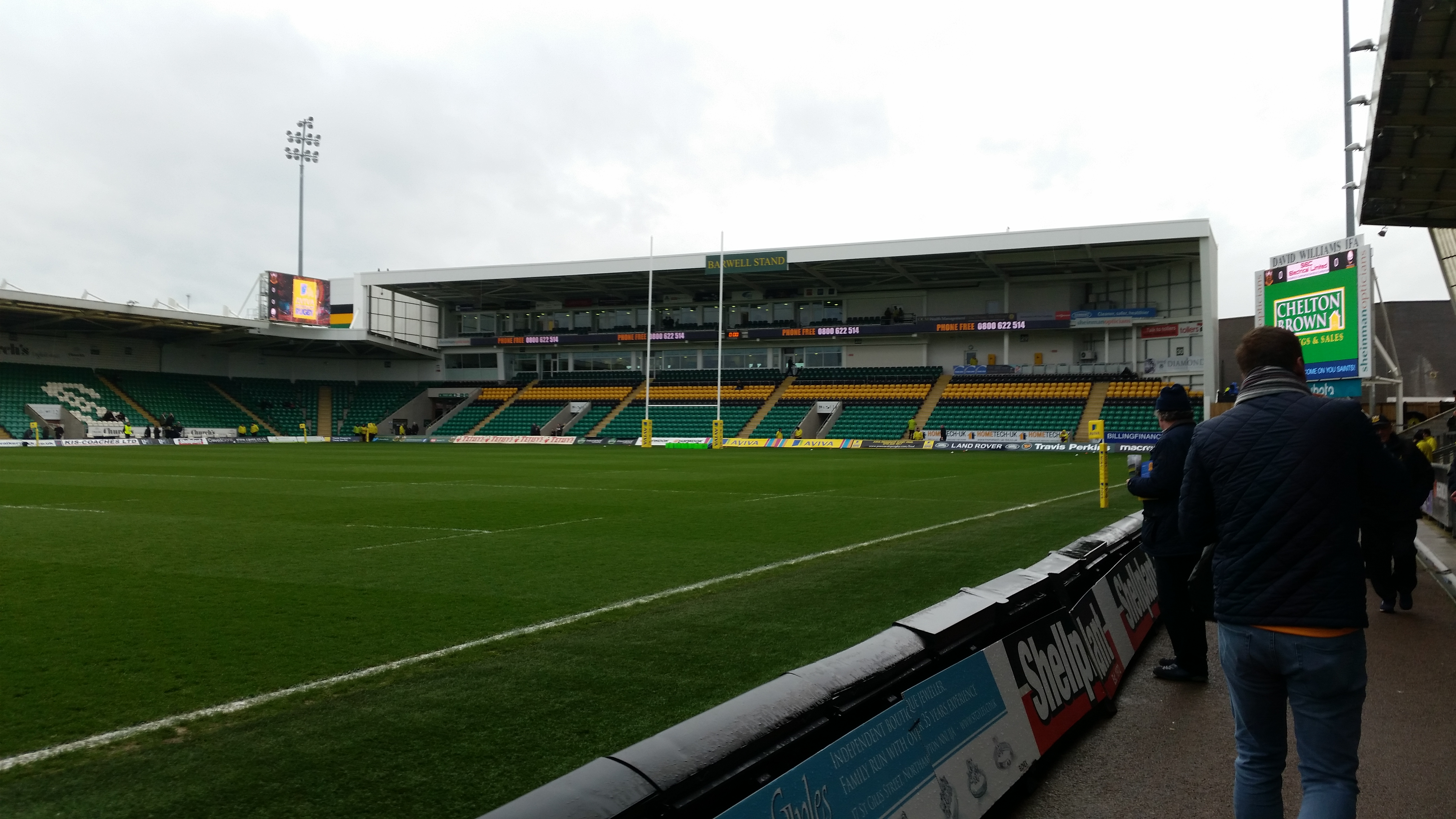
The Barwell Stand, 2017

==== The Barwell Stand ====
This is to the north of the ground and is the newest stand, built in 2015, which replaced The Sturtridge Pavilion, completing the redevelopment of Franklin's Gardens. This stand takes the name of the Barwell family, who were influential in making Northampton Saints one of English rugby's leading clubs at the turn of the professional era in the mid-1990s. This stand houses the members' bar, corporate facilities, control room, the Sturtridge Suite and approximately 2,000 seats. It also houses a war memorial to former Saints players who died in the 1st and 2nd World Wars. This stand was officially opened by Keith Barwell on 14 February 2016.

=== Previous Stands ===
==== The old Gordon Terrace ====
The Gordon Terrace, named after former club chairman Jerry Gordon, also referred to as the East Stand or the "shed", was an concrete, all-standing, covered stand. It was built in the 1920s and was later extended by around 20 metres either side in the 1970s in order to run along the entire length of the pitch. Demolition of the old terrace began in April 2001 to make way for the new Tetley's stand.

==== The South Stand ====
The old South Stand was a temporary stand made with a steel beam construction and was half-covered. It came about as a temporary solution to the increasing interest in rugby union as a spectator sport in the mid-1990s. It wrapped around from the south corner of the Gordon Terrace to the end of the Members Stand. Usually, it was dismantled during the summer and placed into storage until the beginning of the next season.

==== The Members' (West) Stand ====
The Members' Stand formed the main bulk of seating capacity of the stadium and lay on the western side of the ground (now the Church's Stand), backing onto the old Express Lift Factory. It was originally constructed in 1927 and, by the 1990s, served as the main seated area. It was demolished in 2001 to make way for the new Church's Stand.

==== Other stands ====
There were a further two small temporary stands which were situated either side of the Members' Stand.

The larger of the two, which was situated to the north of the Members' Stand was first used in the mid-1990s, and was made of the same temporary material and had the same half-covered design as the South Stand. It was last dismantled in 2001 to make way for Church's Stand.

There was also a smaller, covered, temporary stand in the south corner of the ground until the construction of the South Stand in the mid-1990s.

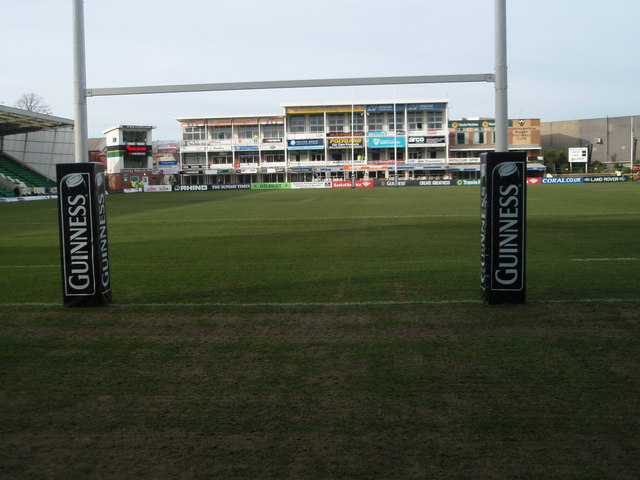
The old Sturtridge Pavilion (now demolished), 2009

==== The Sturtridge Pavilion ====
The 1966/67 season kicked off with style with the opening of the Peter Haddon designed Gordon Sturtridge Pavilion, marked by a floodlit game between the Saints and an R E G Jeeps XV. The pavilion enhanced the Gardens' reputation for being one of the finest rugby grounds in the country.

The Pavilion was earmarked for demolition and redevelopment when the original rebuild was designed, however, due to time and money, the rebuild didn't happen until 2015.

=== Supporters' village ===
The supporters' village lies behind the Cinch Stand and acts as a multi-functional social/communal area, as well as offering a variety of food and drink options.

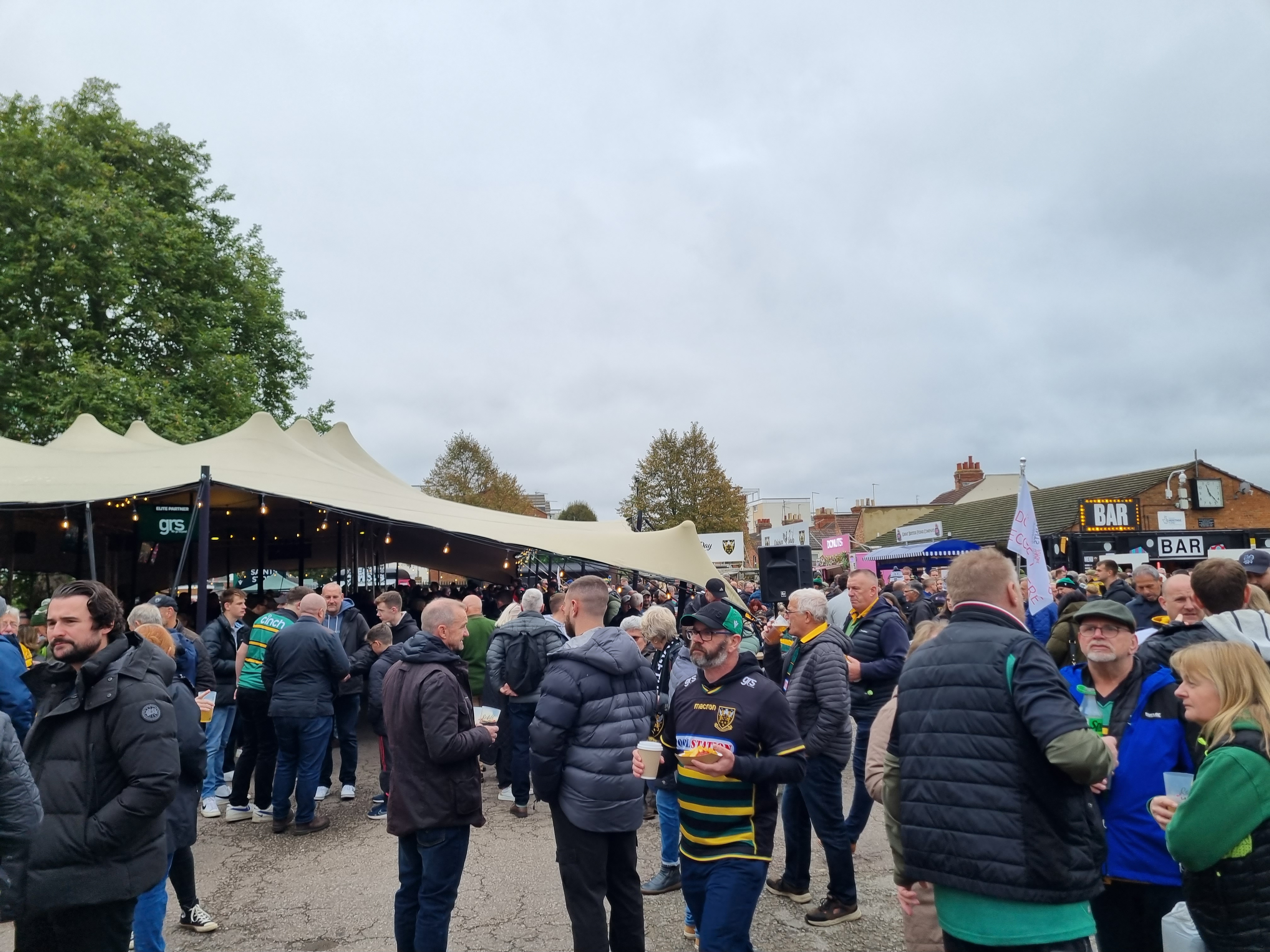
The Supporters' Village looking east, 2023

==== History ====
The village lies on land that was originally part of the meadow area forming the low-lying Nene Wetlands. Previously, the southern half of the area had functioned as a bowling green, and the northern half, owned by Saints, contained the old pond, the clubhouse and the members' bar, the Crooked Hooker. The land containing the bowling green was later purchased by the Saints in 1977.

The village was initially used as a car park and storage area after the construction of the new South Stand in 2001, which also involved the partial draining of the pond. For the 2005 South Stand and car park redevelopment, the village was used as a staging area for heavy machinery but returned to its former position as a VIP car park shortly after.

The construction of the main car park in 2005 solved the parking capacity problem, but it was not until the early 2010s that it was decided to convert the area into a communal area for matches. By 2015, the village included a number of food stalls, a marquee, a bar and several seating areas, as well as a large screen. Since then, a large tent has been installed over the seating area.

==== Food and drink ====
Currently, the village contains the following amenities: three burger bars, four coffee stands, five other food stalls, nine bars and a Saints store.

==== Northampton Saints Foundation Centre ====
Referred to as the "Study Centre" before the Foundation was established in 2018, the Northampton Saints Foundation have their offices in the south-east corner of the village.

The building was originally constructed in the 1960s and served as the clubhouse until the redevelopment of the stadium in the 1990s.

Currently it is used by the heritage department as a research centre, as well as by the educational wing of the department as a classroom.

==== The Crooked Hooker Bar ====
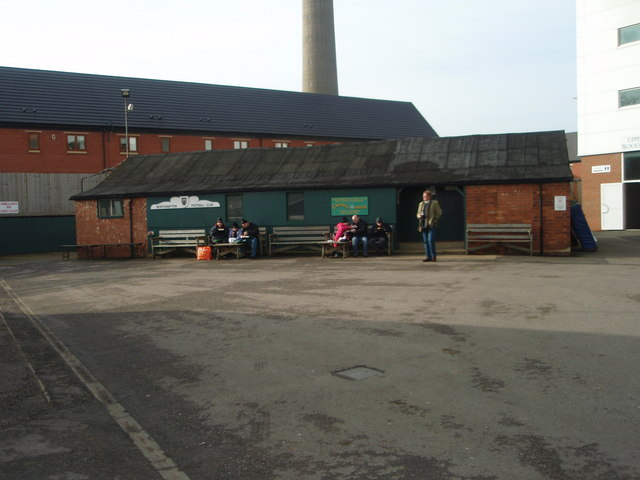
The members-only bar in the north-west corner of the village, 2009

The Crooked Hooker Bar is one of the oldest structures in the ground, and was originally built as a clubhouse for the bowls club in the 1950s, before being purchased by the Saints in 1967 with money gained from their sale of the Harlestone Road training ground.

=== High Performance Centre and training pitches ===
Saints purchased the land to the south and south-west of Franklin's Gardens in 1977 in order to convert it into a training area for the club. Previously they had trained in a number of locations around the town, including the Racecourse and Harlestone Road park.

The Northampton Saints High Performance Centre was constructed between 2022 and 2023 and aims to provide an all-weather, indoor training area for players. It was built on the former main training pitch at the back of the stadium and features changing facilities as well as a half-sized pitch to train on. The pitch has artificial grass and is complete with posts and markings. In 2024, Northamptonshire Cricket Club used the pitch for winter fielding training.

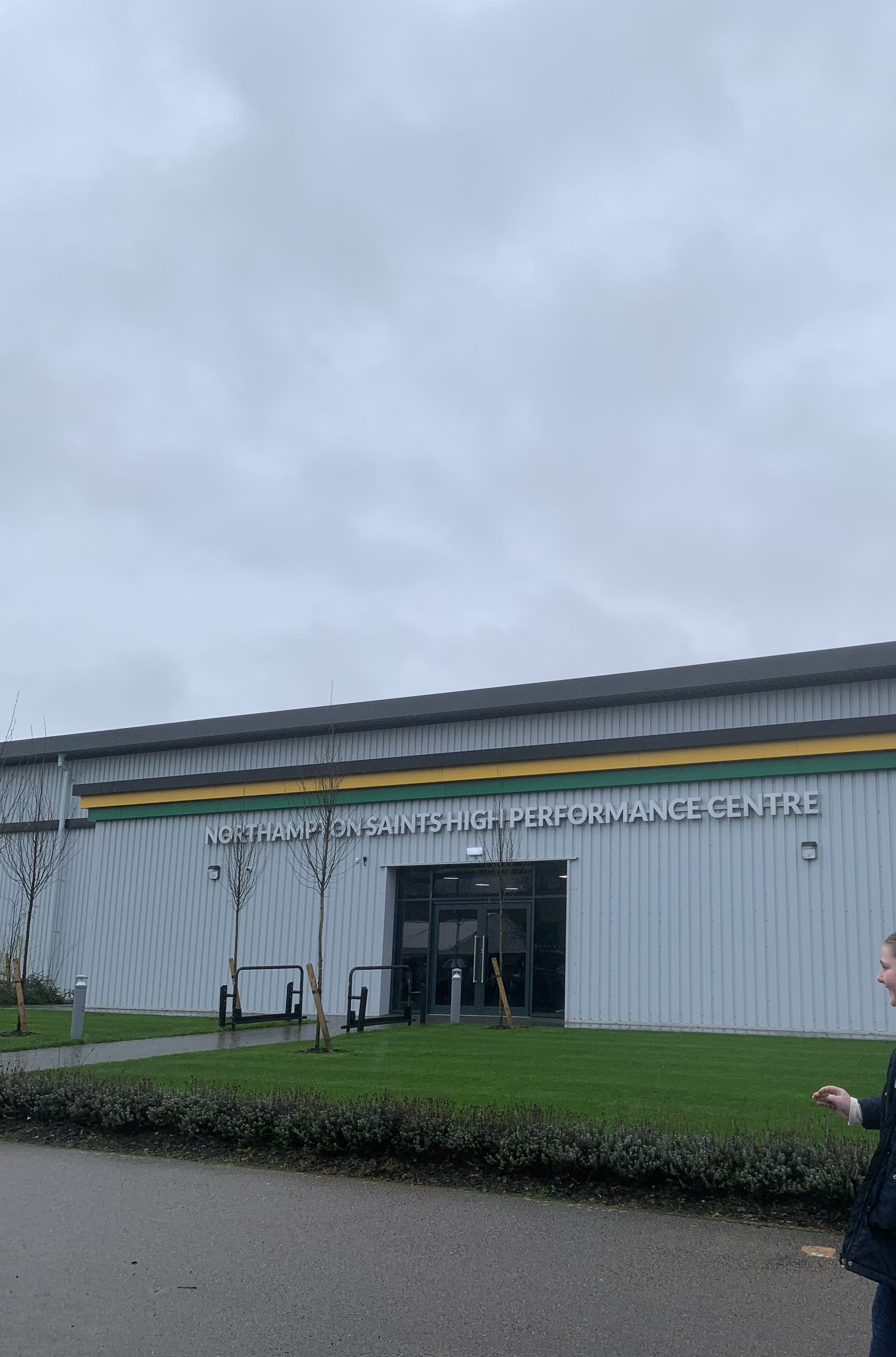
The exterior of Northampton Saints' High Performance Training Centre, 2024

The remaining half of the old first training pitch still exists, and is mainly used for drills and kicking training. The second pitch, to the west of the High Performance Centre, is used for full-pitch training, as well as acting as the main home of Saints' youth development teams and the club's second team, the Wanderers. The third pitch, to the far west of the training areas, is used for training by youth teams as well as an area for youth rugby festivals.

=== Parking ===
The stadium has six car parks, with space for 1,500 cars. The main car parks are next to the outdoor training pitches and were constructed in 2005. They are opposite the car parks used by the Football Club. Executive parking is located just outside the stadium, next to the Carlsberg Stand.

== Future development ==
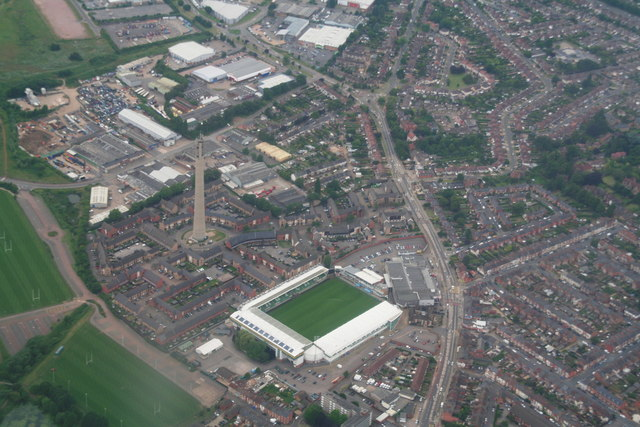
Franklin's Gardens from the air, the National Lift Tower can be seen in the background, 2014

Further development on the existing ground would be compromised by the Beacon Bingo hall which sits in close proximity to the Barwell Stand. The Church's Stand also is compromised by backing onto the site boundary. Further opportunity could involve expanding the Cinch and/or Carlsberg stands.

In late October 2024, the Saints received planning permission to build on land at the western edge of training pitch 3. Currently, it is unclear exactly what that area will be used for, but a number of "commercial" plans are being considered.

== 2025 Women's Rugby World Cup ==
In August 2023, Franklin's Gardens was confirmed as one of eight host venues for the 2025 Women's Rugby World Cup.

2025 Women's Rugby World Cup matches held at Franklin's Gardens
Date	Country	Score	Country	Stage of Tournament	Ref
24 August 2025	Ireland	42–14	Japan	Pool stage (Pool C)	
24 August 2025	South Africa	66–6	Brazil	Pool stage (Pool D)	
30 August 2025	England	92–3	Samoa	Pool stage (Pool A)	
31 August 2025	Ireland	43–27	Spain	Pool stage (Pool C)	
7 September 2025	Italy	64-3	Brazil	Pool stage (Pool D)	
7 September 2025	France	57-10	South Africa	Pool stage (Pool D)	

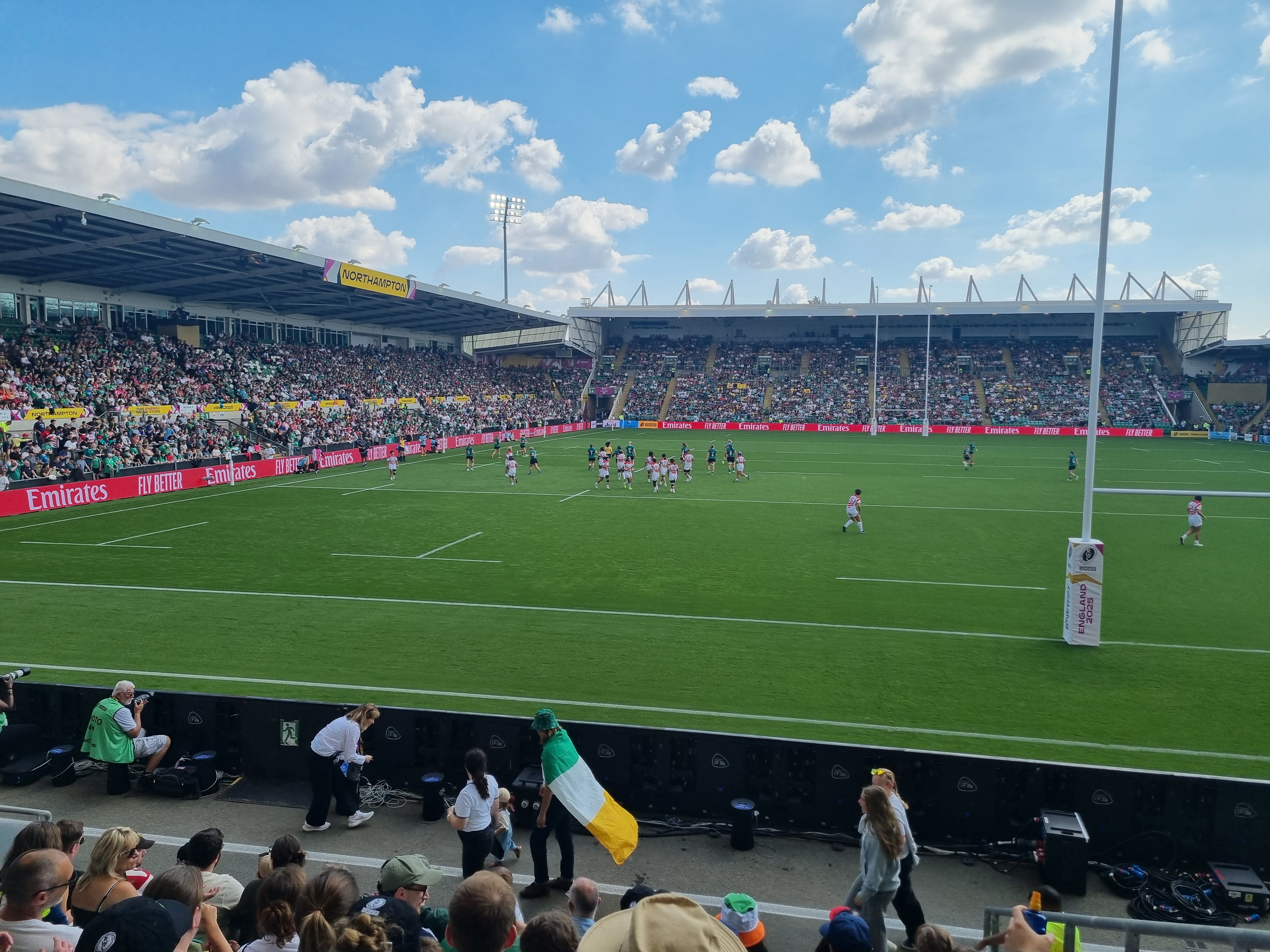
Ireland vs Japan during the 2025 Women's Rugby World Cup

== Other uses ==
=== Anglo-Welsh and Premiership Rugby Cup Finals ===
The Gardens have hosted three major cup finals during the professional era.

The first cup final to be held at the Gardens was the Anglo-Welsh Cup final which saw Gloucester beat Newcastle 34–7 in 2011, the second being another Anglo-Welsh Cup final in 2015, seeing Saracens beat Exeter 23–20.

The most recent cup final to be held at the Gardens saw Saints have a home final against Saracens after a successful 2018-2019 Premiership Rugby Cup campaign. Saints produced special flags for every spectator and went on to win in front of a capacity crowd.

=== Churchill Cup 2011 ===
On 4 June the Churchill Cup was opened with a double header of fixtures as Canada defeated Italy 'A' before eventual winners England Saxons breezed past the USA.

=== Northampton and District finals ===
Franklin's Gardens is used as the standard venue for the finals of the Northampton and District leagues, including junior and senior finals.

=== University of Northampton cross codes ===
On 5 May 2023, the men's Rugby League and Rugby Union teams at the University of Northampton held their annual "crosscodes" match at Franklin's Gardens.

== See also ==
- Northampton
- Northampton Saints
- List of rugby union stadiums by capacity
- List of English rugby league stadia by capacity
- List of European stadia by capacity
- Churchill Cup
- Anglo-Welsh Cup
