= Western Heights High School =

State co-educational secondary school in Rotorua, NZ

- Te Kura Tuarua o Kaitao Rotohokahoka

Location
- Old Quarry Road; Selwyn Heights; Rotorua 3015; New Zealand; 38.1201°S 176.2221°E

Information
- Type: State co-ed secondary
- Motto: Heights Through Opportunity; Māori: Taumata Rau
- Established: 1961
- Sister school: Beppu Shosei
- Educational authority: Ministry of Education
- Ministry of Education Institution no.: 151
- Chairperson: Rebecca Moore
- Principal: James Bracefield
- Teaching staff: 120+
- Years offered: 9–13
- Enrolment: 1,205 (July 2026)
- Houses: Ngā Pumanawa e Waru o Te Arawa; Waiariki; Rotorua Nui ā Kahumatamomoe; Ngongotahā; Te Motu Tapu ā Tinirau
- Song: Taumata Rau
- Socio-economic decile: 4K
- Website: www.whhs.school.nz
- Last updated: 25 November 2024

Western Heights High School (Māori: Te Kura Tuarua o Kaitao Rotohokahoka) is a co-educational state secondary school located in the northwestern suburbs of Rotorua, New Zealand. In April 2013, 1,887 students from Years 9 to 13 (ages 12 to 18) attended the school, including 1,172 students identifying as Māori – the largest Māori school roll in New Zealand in terms of number of students.

Western Heights High School offers Cambridge International Examinations in addition to the National Certificate of Educational Achievement (NCEA).

== Houses ==
Western Heights High School has school houses or groups to identify students and provide a sense of belonging to the school.

The current houses at Western Heights High School are:

- Te Motu Tapu ā Tinirau (Purple)
- Waiāriki (Yellow)
- Ngā Pumanawa e Waru o Te Arawa (Red)
- Ngongotahā (Green)
- Te Rotorua nui ā Kahumatamomoe (Blue)

== Sister school ==
The current sister school to Western Heights High School is Beppu Shosei, a co-educational high school located in Ōita, Japan. The city of Beppu is also the sister city to Rotorua. In August 2024, students from Beppu Shosei visited Western Heights High School for one week on a cultural exchange. In October 2024, 17 students and staff from Western Heights High School attended Beppu Shosei for one week.

== International education ==
Western Heights High School offers international enrolment from a variety of countries. For the year 2025, international student fees to study at Western Heights High School ranges based on duration of the students' duration of stay, travel insurance, NCEA standard admission, student visa renewal, school uniform, school and extra curricular expenses, Christmas holiday fee, and additional recreational expenditure.

== Curriculum ==
Western Heights High School currently requires students in the junior school (Years 9 and 10) to take five compulsory courses throughout the year, along with four additional options classes that will alternate throughout two terms. In Year 11, there are four compulsory courses, and in Year 12, the only compulsory course is English. Students in Years 13 and 14 may choose a minimum of five courses.

Compulsory Classes	Year 9	Year 10	Year 11	Year 12	Year 13
English	•	•	•	•	
Science	•	•	•		
Mathematics	•	•	•		
Physical Education and Health	•	•	•		
Social Sciences	•	•			

=== Years 9 & 10 ===
In year 9 mainstream, students may choose four of the following elective courses which will alternate after two terms, excluding the Rugby League Academy, Sports Academy, and Volleyball Academy.

In year 10 mainstream, students may only choose two elective courses as listed below, where year 10 Te Akoranga Reo Rua students can only choose one subject given Te Reo Māori is compulsory.

- Animation
- Business Innovation
- Chinese
- Contemporary Music
- Dance
- Design & Technical Drawing
- Digital Coding
- Drama
- Fabric Technology
- Food Technology
- French
- Hard Materials: Wood
- Hard Materials: Metal
- Japanese
- Performance Music
- Rugby League Academy
- Spanish
- Sports Academy
- Te Reo Māori
- Visual Arts
- Volleyball Academy

=== Year 11 ===
In year 11, students may choose to remove social science as a course, and may select two options as listed above, preferably those in which an enjoyment was found throughout years 9 and 10. Students may also choose to study six subjects in year 11, but require approval from the subjects' Head of Faculty and Year Level Dean.

=== Year 12 ===
In year 12, students may choose a further four subjects, with the required mathematics course. Similar to year 11, students may choose to study six subjects, but will require approval from the subjects' Head of Faculty and Year Level Dean.

=== Year 13 ===
In year 13, students may take their desired courses, while adhering to any subject pre-requisites.

== Notable alumni ==
- Steve McDowall – Rugby Union player (Auckland, All Black)
- Temuera Morrison – Actor
- Nando Pijnaker – All Whites defender
- Caleb Ralph – Rugby Union player (Crusaders, All Black)
- Hika Reid – Rugby Union player (All Black) and coach
- Elias Scheres – Netball player
- Buck Shelford – All Blacks Captain
- Darrall Shelford – NZ Māori (rugby union)
