= SA Rugby Women's Player of the Year =

- Date: 2022; 4 years ago
- Country: South Africa
- Presented by: South African Rugby Union
- Formerly called: SA Rugby Women's Achiever of the Year (2004–2021)
- First award: 2021
- Current holder: (South Africa) Nadine Roos (2025)

Highlights
- Most awards: (South Africa) Nadine Roos (3 awards each)

The SA Rugby Women’s Player of the Year is awarded annually to honour the South Africa's outstanding rugby union player of the year.

== List of winners ==
Winners and nominees of the SA Rugby Women's Player of the Year
Year	Image	Winner	Position	Other nominees	Ref(s)
2025	—N/a	Nadine Roos	Scrum-half	Byrhandré Dolf (Full-back); Aseza Hele (Number 8); Libbie Janse van Rensburg (Fly-half); Babalwa Latsha (Prop)	
2024	Nadine Roos in 2024	Nadine Roos	Scrum-half	Aseza Hele (Number 8); Libbie Janse van Rensburg (Fly-half); Chumisa Qawe (Centre); Vainah Ubisi (Lock)	
2023	—N/a	Libbie Janse van Rensburg	Fly-half	Aseza Hele (Number 8); Babalwa Latsha (Prop); Rights Mkhari (Lock); Nadine Roos Scrum-half	
2022	—N/a	Nadine Roos	Scrum-half	Lusanda Dumke (Flanker); Aseza Hele (Number 8); Zintle Mpupha (Centre); Aphiwe Ngwevu (Centre)	
2022	—N/a	Lusanda Dumke	Flanker	—N/a	

Year	SA Rugby Women's Achiever of the Year	ref
2019	Aseza Hele
2018	Nolusindiso Booi
2017	Babalwa Latsha
2016	Marithy Pienaar
2015	Veroeshka Grain
2014	Zenay Jordaan
2012	Yolanda Meiring
2011	Cebisa Kula
2010	Dolly Mavungwana
2009	Saloma Booysen
2008	Lorinda Brown
2007	Natasha Hoffmeester
2006	Mandisa Williams
2005	Ingrid Botha
2004	Ronwin Kelly

=== Multiple winners ===
- 3 times:

2022, 2024, 2025 - Nadine Roos

== See also ==
- SA Rugby Men's Player of the Year
- World Rugby Women's 15s Player of the Year
