= Larissa Henwood =

Brazil international rugby union player (born 1994)

- Born: 24 January 1994 (age 32) Minas Gerais, Brazil
- Height: 167 cm (5 ft 6 in)
- Weight: 74 kg (163 lb; 11 st 9 lb)

Rugby union career
- Position: Loose Forward
Provincial / State sides
Years	Team	Apps	(Points)
2017–	Counties Manukau	29	(10)
International career
Years	Team	Apps	(Points)
2024–	Brazil	6	(10)
National sevens team
Years	Team		Comps
2016	Portugal 7s		

Larissa Henwood (née Lima e Silva; born 24 January 1994) is a Brazilian rugby union player. She represents Brazil internationally and plays provincially for Counties Manukau in the Farah Palmer Cup.

== Early life ==
Henwood was born in Brazil but moved with her family to Portugal at the age of eight. She discovered rugby as an eleven year old in Coimbra.

== Rugby league career ==
Henwood played for the Point Chevalier Pirates based in Auckland. She won the Auckland Championship and came close to representing Brazil in the delayed 2021 Women's Rugby League World Cup but tore her ACL for a second time.

== Rugby union career ==
=== Sevens ===
Henwood was called-up to Portugal's sevens team in 2012, but had to wait for four years to make her international sevens debut. She decided to try out for the Brazilian sevens team preparing for the 2016 Rio Games at 18. She was playing for Goianos in the Super Sevens when she tore her ACL for the first time.

=== XVs ===
Henwood made her international debut for Brazil against the Netherlands in November 2024.

She was forced to move to São Paulo for four months with her daughter to try to progress through the training camp to make the final squad. In July 2025, she was named in the Brazilian squad for the 2025 Women's Rugby World Cup in England.

== Personal life ==
Henwood met her husband, former Chiefs and Hurricanes Openside Flanker Sam Henwood, when they both played for Técnico in Lisbon. She moved to New Zealand in 2017 to join her now-husband. She gave birth to her daughter Skye in 2023.

Her sister-in-law, Kate Henwood, plays for the Black Ferns.
