= Taís Prioste =

- Born: 9 April 1999 (age 27) Fortaleza, Brazil
- Height: 165 cm (5 ft 5 in)

Rugby union career
- Position: Prop
Senior career
Years	Team	Apps	(Points)
2023–2024	Montpellier		(0)
2024–	Bobigny		(0)
International career
Years	Team	Apps	(Points)
2022–	Brazil	13	(10)

Taís Prioste (born 9 April 1999) is a Brazilian rugby union player. She plays Prop for Brazil internationally and for French club, Bobigny in the Élite 1 competition.

== Rugby career ==
Prioste was born in Fortaleza to a family of seven children, she initially played football and had dreamt of becoming a professional. She discovered rugby union at university after a friend encouraged her to join training. Having obtained a scholarship for her studies, she played in the Brazilian university championship.

She made her international debut for Brazil against Colombia in 2022. In 2023, she joined Montpellier, making her the first Brazilian to play in the French Élite 1 competition.

Prioste then had a short stint with the Western Force in Australia. In June 2024, she was part of the Brazilian national team that qualified for the 2025 Women's Rugby World Cup in England when they defeated Colombia 34–13. She joined AC Bobigny 93 for the 2024–25 Élite 1 season.

In July 2025, she subsequently made the Brazilian squad for the Women's Rugby World Cup. While several of the Brazil players played abroad, she was the only one that played in France.
