= Exia Shelford =

Exia Edwards
- Born: 12 November 1975 (age 51) Ōpōtiki
- Height: 1.70 m (5 ft 7 in)
- Weight: 75 kg (165 lb; 11 st 11 lb)
- Notable relative(s): Frank Shelford (uncle); Buck Shelford (cousin); Darrall Shelford (cousin) Monica Falkner (daughter) Former Silver Fern

Rugby union career
- Position(s): Wing, Centre, Fullback
Provincial / State sides
| Years | Team | Apps | (Points) |
- Bay of Plenty
International career
| Years | Team | Apps | (Points) |
| 1998–2006 | New Zealand | 27 | (90) |
Medal record
Representing New Zealand
Women's rugby union
Rugby World Cup
| Gold medal – first place | 1998 Netherlands | Team competition |
| Gold medal – first place | 2002 Spain | Team competition |
| Gold medal – first place | 2006 Canada | Team competition |

Exia Edwards (née Shelford, born 12 November 1975) is a former New Zealand rugby union player, representing New Zealand and Bay of Plenty. She made her international debut at the 1998 Rugby World Cup in the Netherlands. She was also part of two other successful Rugby World Cup's in 2002 and 2006.

In 1999, Shelford scored a try when the Black Ferns beat the United States 65–5 at Palmerston North. At the 2005 Canada Cup she scored a try in the 30–9 victory over Scotland at Ottawa.

Shelford also played rugby league for the New Zealand Māori women's team and netball for Bay of Plenty.
