= Sandy Park =

Sports venue in Exeter, Devon, England

Sandy Park Stadium
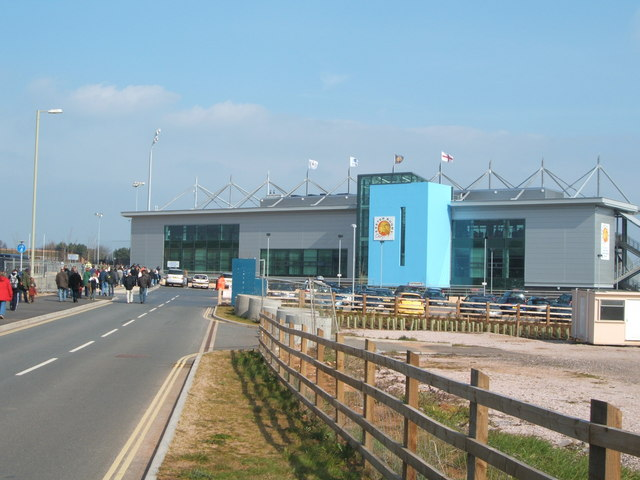
- The exterior of the stadium
- Interactive map of Sandy Park Stadium
- Address: Sandy Park Way, Exeter, Devon EX2 7NN, United Kingdom
- Location: Exeter, Devon, England
- Coordinates: 50°42′34″N 3°28′3″W
- Owner: Exeter Chiefs
- Operator: Exeter Chiefs
- Capacity: 15,600
- Surface: Desso Grassmaster
- Record attendance: 15,000; Chiefs vs Leicester (23 December 2023)

Construction
- Opened: 1 September 2006
- Renovated: 2012
- Cost: £15m

Tenants
- Exeter Chiefs (2006 - present); 2015 Rugby World Cup; 2025 Women's Rugby World Cup

Website
- www.sandypark.co.uk

Sandy Park is a rugby union stadium and conference and banqueting centre in Exeter, England. It is the home ground of Exeter Chiefs, who from the 2010–11 season have been playing in Premiership Rugby, the top flight of the English rugby union league system. The club relocated there from their former stadium at the County Ground in 2006. The stadium can hold 15,600 spectators and is located adjacent to M5 junction 30, which is around 5 miles from Exeter City Centre.

Sandy Park played host to the England Saxons vs Ireland Wolfhounds on 28 January 2012; the England Saxons won 23–17.

Sandy Park also hosted 5 different matches for the Women's Rugby World cup 2025, creating a new record number of viewers in the stadium (11,618)

== Expansion ==
In the summer of 2012 the club announced a five-year plan to redevelop the ground to hold 20,600, which will be carried out in phases, starting with the existing west stand to provide a much larger bar area and extending the grandstand the full length of the pitch (in place of the existing temporary seating). The second phase (subject to finance) will involve building a large conference centre to the south and then extending the main grandstand around the corner and along the south end of the ground. The proposed stands behind each of the goal posts will be much larger than the existing main grandstand, but the proposed east stand will be similar in size to the main stand, due to its proximity adjacent the M5 motorway restricting its size.

The first phase of the redevelopment (costing £10million) was carried out over the summer of 2014 and Sandy Park reopened in September that year with an increased capacity of 12,500, the capacity that the stadium will have when it hosts matches at the 2015 Rugby World Cup. The Conference & Banqueting facilities of Sandy Park were also increased, doubling the capacity for conferences and other events.

The second phase was announced in July 2021 and involves expansion of the East stand to create a further 1,948 seats and taking capacity to 15,600.

== 2015 Rugby World Cup matches ==
Sandy Park was one of thirteen venues in England and Wales that hosted 2015 Rugby World Cup games.

Date	Time (GMT)	Team #1	Score	Team #2	Round	Attendance
22 September 2015	14:15	Namibia	21-35	Tonga	Pool C	10,103
5 October 2015	14:15	Georgia	17-16	Namibia	Pool C	11,556
11 October 2015	14:45	Romania	22-32	Italy	Pool D	11,450

== 2025 Women's Rugby World Cup ==
In August 2023, Sandy Park was confirmed as one of eight host venues for the 2025 Women's Rugby World Cup.

2025 Women's Rugby World Cup matches held at Sandy Park
Date	Country	Score	Country	Stage of Tournament	Ref
23 August 2025	France	24–0	Italy	Pool stage (Pool D)	
31 August 2025	New Zealand	62–19	Japan	Pool stage (Pool C)	
31 August 2025	France	84–5	Brazil	Pool stage (Pool D)	
6 September 2025	Canada	40–19	Scotland	Pool stage (Pool B)	
6 September 2025	Wales	25–28	Fiji	Pool stage (Pool B)	
13 September 2025	New Zealand	46–17	South Africa	Quarter-finals	
14 September 2025	France	18–13	Ireland	Quarter-finals	

== Gallery ==
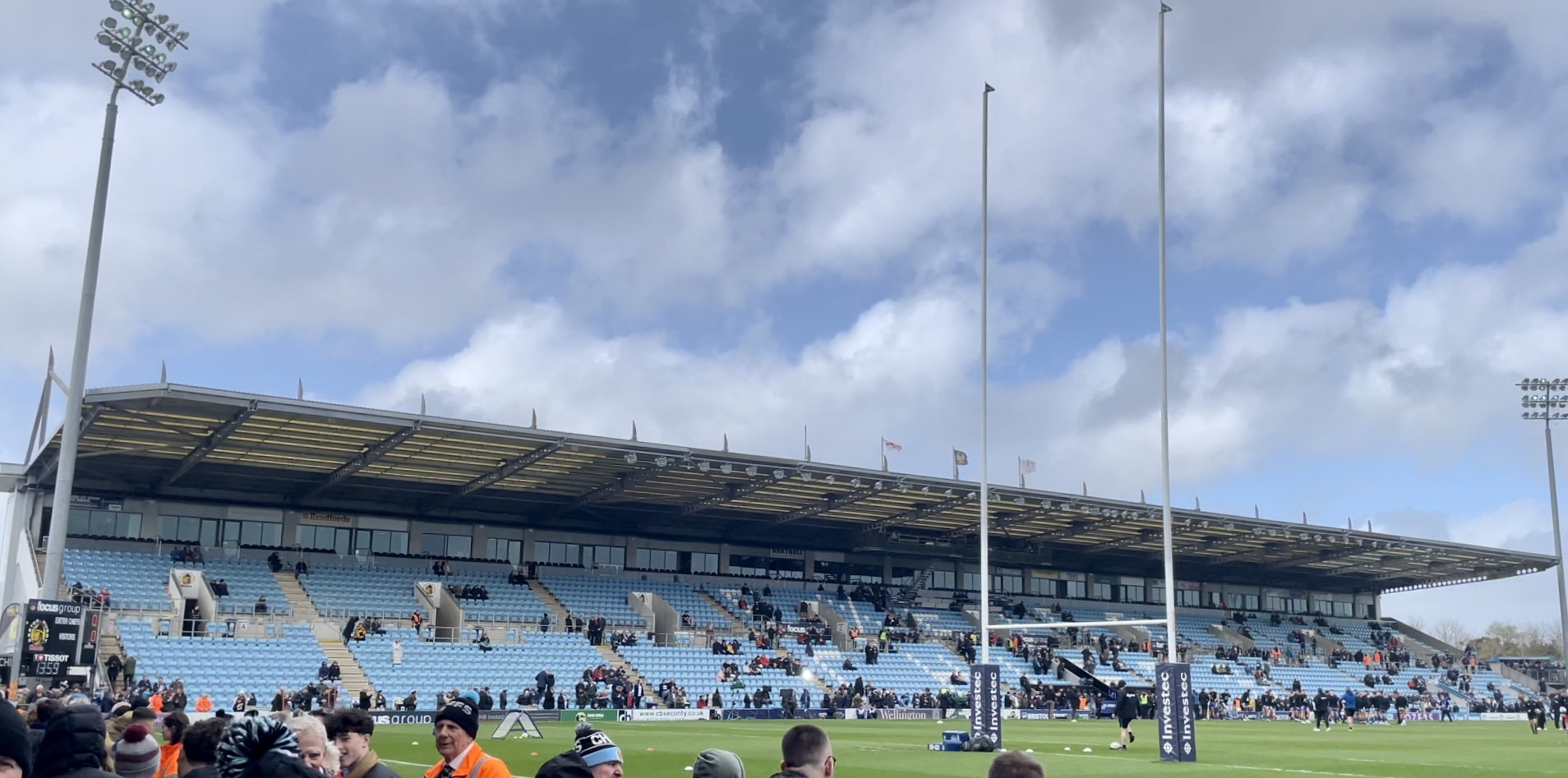
West Stand

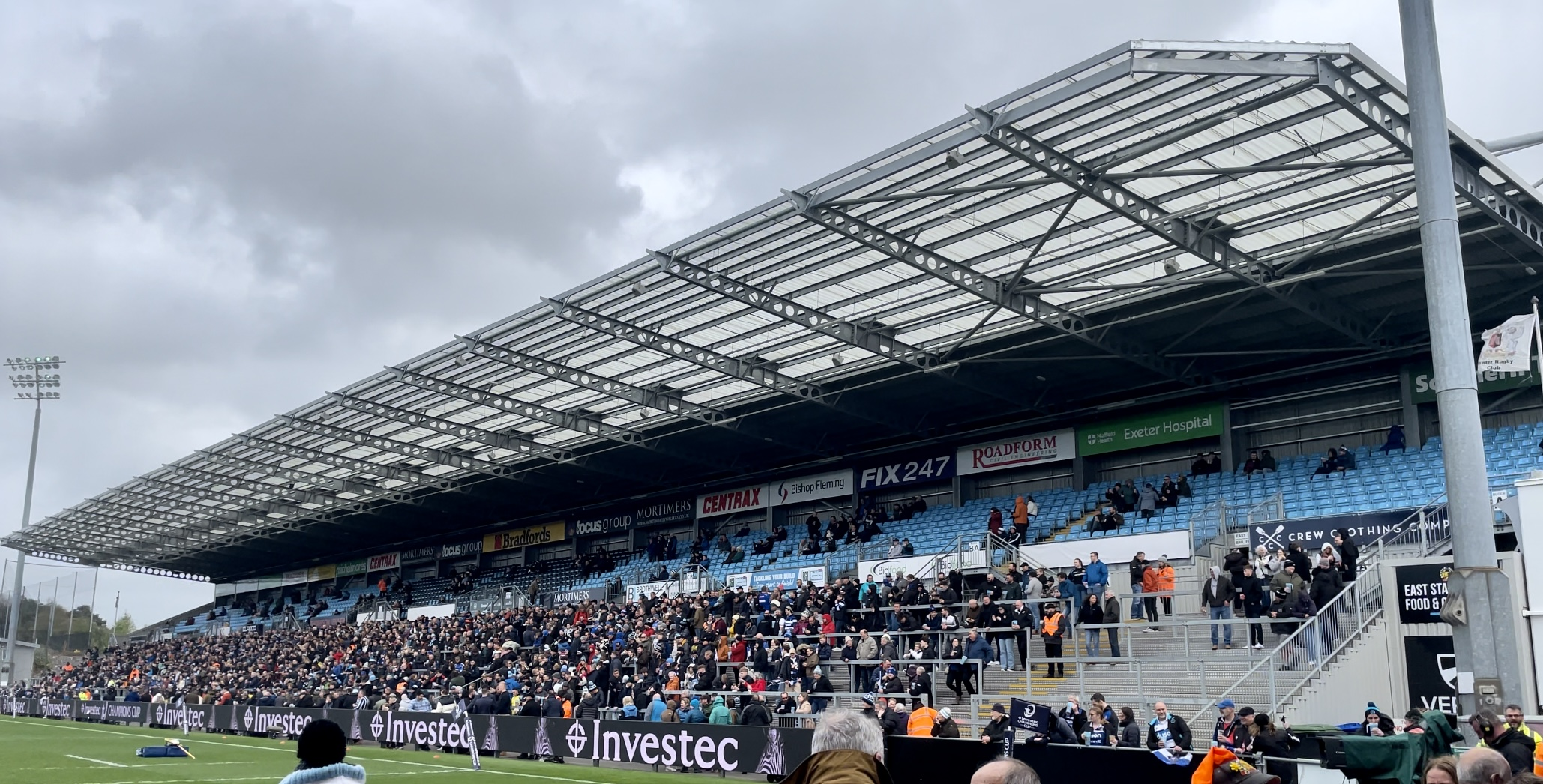
East Stand
