= Nadine Roos =

South African rugby union and sevens player

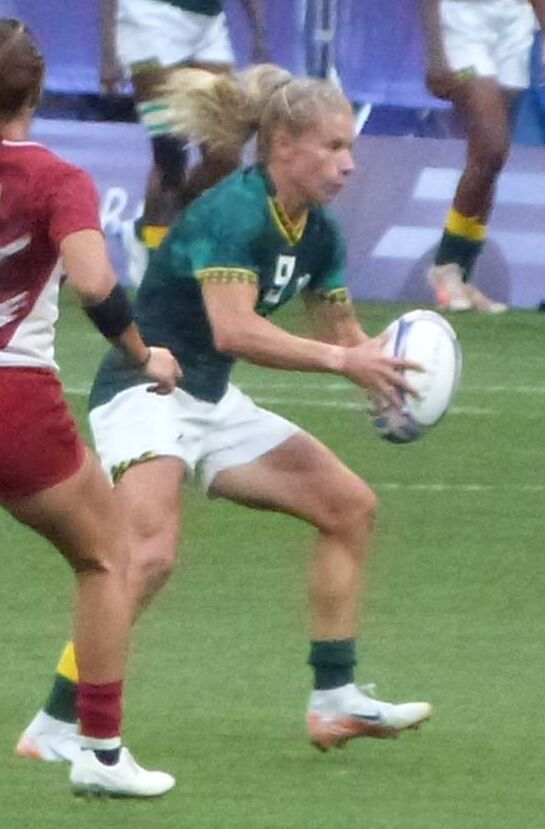
- Roos in 2024
- Born: 9 May 1996 (age 30)
- Height: 1.64 m (5 ft 5 in)
- Weight: 62 kg (137 lb)
- University: University of Pretoria

Rugby union career
- Position: Utility back
Senior career
Years	Team	Apps	(Points)
2022–2023	Bulls Daisies		
2023–2025	Nagato Blue Angels		
International career
Years	Team	Apps	(Points)
2021–	South Africa	30	(876)
- Correct as of 25 August 2026
National sevens team
Years	Team		Comps
2016–	South Africa		42 (140 pts)

Nadine Roos (born 9 May 1996) is a South African rugby union and sevens player.

== Background ==
Roos was abandoned by her mother at a pre-school crèche in South Africa, her grandmother traveled 160 miles (260 km) in order to look after her. She was a hurdler and earned herself a bursary at the University of Pretoria where she was introduced to rugby.

Roos made the 2021 CrossFit Games.

== Rugby career ==
Roos made her international sevens debut in the Dubai tournament of the 2016–17 World Rugby Women's Sevens Series.

In 2018, Roos competed for South Africa in the Commonwealth Games. She later featured in the Rugby World Cup Sevens where they finished 14th overall.

Roos was selected for the South African women's sevens team again and played in the 2022 Rugby World Cup Sevens. She was named in South Africa's women's fifteens team for the 2021 Rugby World Cup.

In 2023, she was named in the Springbok women's sevens side for the Dubai Women's Sevens. She was a member of the South African side that competed at the 2024 Summer Olympics.

In September 2024, she was confirmed as part of South Africa's fifteens squad for the 2024 WXV 2 tournament.

On 9 August 2025, she was named in the Springbok women's squad to the Rugby World Cup in England.

== Honours ==
- SA Rugby Awards
  - SA Rugby Women's Player of the Year: 2022, 2024, 2025
  - Springbok Women’s Sevens Player of the Year: 2025
