= Larissa Carvalho (rugby union) =

Brazilian rugby sevens player (born 2003)

- Born: 31 May 2003 (age 23)
- Height: 1.70 m (5 ft 7 in)
- Weight: 67 kg (148 lb)

Rugby union career
- Position: Back row
Senior career
Years	Team	Apps	(Points)
	Curitiba		(0)
International career
Years	Team	Apps	(Points)
?–	Brazil	11	(0)
National sevens team
Years	Team		Comps
2022	Brazil		1

Larissa Alves de Carvalho (born 31 May 2003) is a Brazilian rugby union and sevens player.

== Rugby career ==
She represented Brazil at the 2022 Rugby World Cup Sevens in Cape Town. They defeated Spain 19–17 in the 11th-place final to finish eleventh overall.

In July 2025, she was named in Brazil's fifteens squad for the Women's Rugby World Cup in England.
