= Murray Hudson =

George Cross recipient

- Born: 24 February 1938; Ōpōtiki, Bay of Plenty, New Zealand
- Died: 13 February 1974 (aged 35); Waiouru, New Zealand
- Military career
- Allegiance: New Zealand
- Branch: New Zealand Army
- Service years: 1961–1974
- Rank: Sergeant
- Service number: T/14858103
- Units: Masterton Company, 7 Battalion, Royal New Zealand Infantry Regiment
- Conflicts: Indonesia-Malaysia confrontation Vietnam War
- Awards: George Cross

Murray Ken Hudson, GC (24 February 1938 – 13 February 1974) was a sergeant with the Royal New Zealand Infantry Regiment who lost his life when trying to protect soldiers under his command at Waiouru Military Camp. He was awarded the George Cross posthumously on 11 October 1974.

== Military career ==
Born in Ōpōtiki in the Bay of Plenty, where he attended Ōpōtiki College, Hudson enlisted in the New Zealand Army on 24 May 1961. He served in Malaya, Borneo and Vietnam, serving with the New Zealand Special Air Service.

Sergeant Hudson was a drill instructor at Waiouru supervising a training exercise when a non-commissioned officer (NCO) accidentally armed a grenade he was about to throw. Hudson saw the soldier freeze, and immediately ordered him to throw it. The NCO was still unable to react so Hudson grasped his hand and tried to release the grenade, which exploded, killing both men.
