= Darrel Shelford =

Former Scotland international rugby league footballer

- Born: Darrel Mark F. Shelford; 29 July 1962 (age 64) Rotorua, New Zealand

Rugby union career
- Position: Centre
Senior career
Years	Team	Apps	(Points)
–	Ngongotaha		
–	Wakefield RFC		
Provincial / State sides
Years	Team	Apps	(Points)
1983–90	Bay of Plenty	59	(40)
International career
Years	Team	Apps	(Points)
1989–90	New Zealand Maori	2	(0)
- Rugby league career

Playing information
- Position: Centre
Club
Years	Team	Pld	T	G	FG	P
1990–94	Bradford Northern	133	44	0	0	176
1994–96	Huddersfield Giants	74	21	0	0	84
	Total	207	65	0	0	260
Representative
Years	Team	Pld	T	G	FG	P
1995–96	Scotland	5	5	0	0	20

Darrel Shelford (born 29 July 1962) is a former professional rugby union and rugby league footballer, and coach.

== Early years ==
Shelford attended Western Heights High School in Rotorua, New Zealand. He is the brother of All Blacks legend Buck Shelford.

== Playing career ==
Shelford played rugby union for the Bay of Plenty Rugby Union, and the New Zealand Māori team before switching codes and heading to England in 1990.

He played rugby league for Bradford Northern, and the Huddersfield Giants, playing in the Centres.

Shelford played at centre in Bradford Northern's 2–12 defeat by Warrington in the 1990–91 Regal Trophy Final during the 1990–91 season at Headingley, Leeds on Saturday 12 January 1991.

Shelford then returned to union, playing for Wakefield RFC.

== Representative career ==
Shelford won five caps for the Scotland national rugby league team while at the Huddersfield Giants in 1995 and 1996, including playing at the 1995 Emerging Nations Tournament.

== Coaching career ==
Shelford has coached the Scottish rugby league side and also worked as an assistant coach at Wakefield RFC.

Shelford returned to Bradford Bulls in 1997 as part of the coaching staff, initially coaching the Academy team before being given a full-time role two years later as an assistant to head coach Matthew Elliott. He left the club in 2002 to join Saracens, where his brother Buck was the head coach. He was released along with the rest of the coaching staff a year later. He also coached at Italian club Arix Viadana between 2006 and 2009.

For many years, Shelford worked as a director at the Rotorua-based New Zealand Sports Academy.
