= Libbie Janse van Rensburg =

South African rugby union and sevens player

- Full name: Elizabetha Magdalena Janse van Rensburg
- Born: 28 September 1994 (age 32) Lephalale, South Africa
- Height: 1.78 m (5 ft 10 in)
- Weight: 72 kg (159 lb)
- University: University of Pretoria

Rugby union career
- Position: Flyhalf
- Current team: Bulls Daisies
Senior career
Years	Team	Apps	(Points)
2021–2022	Blue Bulls Women		
2023–	Bulls Daisies		
International career
Years	Team	Apps	(Points)
2021–	South Africa	30	(219)
- Correct as of 14 September 2025
National sevens team
Years	Team		Comps
2013–	South Africa		2 (2 pts)

Elizabetha "Libbie" Magdalena Janse van Rensburg (born 28 September 1994) is a South African rugby union and sevens player.

== Rugby career ==
Janse van Rensburg made her debut for the Springbok Women in 2021. In a test match against Namibia, she scored two tries and added 14 conversions for a personal contribution of 38 points – a new Test record for the Springbok Women.

In 2022 she was selected for the 2021 World Cup squad. In South Africa's second game against Fiji, they were awarded a penalty in the 79th minute, Janse van Rensburg kicked and South Africa went ahead 17–14. Fiji, would retain the restart and score a try to win the game.

In 2023, Janse van Rensburg was named as a part of the first professional women's team in South Africa, the Bulls Daisies. She was the vice-captain in their 2023 Women's Premier Division win.

In April 2023, it was announced that Janse van Rensburg would join the sevens team ahead of the 2023 World Rugby Sevens Challenger Series. South Africa won the series and earned promotion to the SVNS, Janse van Rensburg scoring the game-winning try in the final against Belgium.

Janse van Rensburg played in WXV 2 for the XV team, where she was the top try scorer and top point scorer, as South Africa finished third. She joined the sevens team for the 2023 Dubai Sevens, where she sustained an injury.

In 2024, Janse van Rensburg was named as the 2023 SA Rugby Women's Player of the Year. Following her recovery, Janse van Rensburg joined the team for the 2024 Spain Sevens. She was a member of the South African side that competed at the 2024 Summer Olympics in Paris.

On 9 August 2025, she was named in South Africa's squad to the Women's Rugby World Cup.
