= 2025 Women's Rugby World Cup qualifying =

Tournament details
- Dates: 3 February – 13 October 2024

The qualification process for the 2025 Women's Rugby World Cup in England began during the knockout stage of the 2021 tournament in New Zealand, at which the four teams (New Zealand, England, France and Canada) that reached the semi-finals qualified automatically for the 2025 event. A further six teams qualified as winners of six regional tournaments in 2024. The final six spots went to the highest-finishing WXV teams who had not already qualified.

== Qualified teams ==
Region	Automatic qualifiers	Regional qualifiers	WXV qualifiers	Total teams
Africa	—	South Africa	0	1
Asia	—	Japan	0	1
Europe	England; France	Ireland	Italy; Scotland; Wales; Spain	7
North America	Canada	United States	—	2
Oceania	New Zealand	Fiji	Australia; Samoa	4
South America	—	Brazil	—	1
Totals	4/4	6/6	6/6	16/16

== Qualification process ==
Following the previous World Cup, four teams received an automatic qualification berth - these berths being given to the top 4 teams (New Zealand, England, France, and Canada). England also automatically qualified as host. The remaining 12 berths for the tournament will be awarded to the winners of four regional tournaments, the highest finishing not automatic qualifying teams in the 2024 Women's Six Nations and 2024 Pacific Four and the six highest finishing 2024 WXV teams who have not yet qualified.

=== Africa ===
Rugby Africa was granted one spot to the winner of the 2024 Rugby Africa Women's Cup (Africa 1).

Pos	Team	Pld	W	D	L	PF	PA	PD	TF	TA	TB	LB	Pts	Qualification
1	South Africa	3	3	0	0	164	22	+142	28	4	3	0	15	Qualifies as Africa 1
2	Madagascar	3	2	0	1	58	73	−15	10	13	1	0	9	
3	Kenya	3	1	0	2	66	109	−43	12	19	1	1	6	
4	Cameroon	3	0	0	3	22	106	−84	4	18	0	1	1	

=== Americas ===
Rugby Americas North was not granted a direct spot to the World Cup, but Sudamérica Rugby was granted one spot, awarded to the winner of a qualifying match between Brazil and Colombia (South America 1).

29 June 2024
15:30 PYT (UTC-4)

Colombia	13–34	Brazil
Try: Juliana Soto 15' m Laura Gutierrez 43' m Pen: María Arzuaga 38'; Cards: Catalina Suárez (yellow card) 9' to 19'; Laura Mejía (yellow card) 55' to 65'; Gisel Gómez (yellow card) 59' to 69'	Report	Try: Íris Coluna 10' m Isadora Lopes 27' m Eshyllen Coimbra 32' c Aline Mayumi 40+1' m Yasmim Soares 61' m Mariana Nicolau 65' c Con: Raquel Kochhann 34'; Fernanda Tenório 66'; Cards: Leticia Medeiros (yellow card) 74' to end' Patrícia Lima (yellow card) 78' to end'

Estadio Héroes de Curupayty, Luque
Referee: Federico Solari (UAR)

=== Asia ===
Asia Rugby was granted one spot to the winner of the 2024 Asia Rugby Women's Championship (Asia 1).

Pos	Team	Pld	W	D	L	PF	PA	PD	TF	TA	TB	LB	Pts	Qualification
1	Japan	2	2	0	0	93	12	+81	14	2	2	0	10	Qualifies as Asia 1
2	Hong Kong China	2	1	0	1	34	29	+5	5	4	0	0	4	
3	Kazakhstan	2	0	0	2	0	86	−86	0	13	0	0	0	

Updated to match(es) played on 1 June 2024. Source: Asia Rugby

=== Europe ===
Rugby Europe was granted one spot to the highest finishing team in the 2024 Women's Six Nations Championship that hadn't already qualified automatically (Europe 1). Ireland qualified as Europe 1 by finishing third behind England and France.

Pos	Team	Pld	W	D	L	PF	PA	PD	TF	TA	GS	TB	LB	Pts	Qualification
1	England	5	5	0	0	270	41	+229	44	5	3	5	0	28	Automatically qualified via the previous World Cup
2	France	5	4	0	1	152	79	+73	22	11	0	3	0	19	Automatically qualified via the previous World Cup
3	Ireland	5	2	0	3	99	170	−71	13	26	0	1	1	10	Qualifies as Europe 1
4	Scotland	5	2	0	3	54	104	−50	8	15	0	0	1	9	Qualify via WXV
5	Italy	5	1	0	4	72	146	−74	10	23	0	1	2	7	Qualify via WXV
6	Wales	5	1	0	4	55	162	−107	7	24	0	0	1	5	Qualify via WXV

Source: Women's Six Nations

=== Oceania ===
Oceania Rugby was granted one spot to the winner of the 2024 Oceania Rugby Women's Championship (Oceania 1).

Pos	Team	Pld	W	D	L	PF	PA	PD	TF	TA	TB	LB	Pts	Qualification
1	Fiji	3	3	0	0	160	22	+138	28	2	2	0	14	Qualifies as Oceania 1
2	Samoa (Note: Samoa were awarded a default victory and received 5 Points after their cancelled game against Papua New Guinea.)	2	1	0	1	42	34	+8	2	4	1	0	10	Qualifies via WXV
3	Tonga	3	1	0	2	49	82	−33	8	13	1	0	5	
4	Papua New Guinea	2	0	0	2	11	124	−113	1	20	0	0	0	

Updated to match(es) played on 2 June 2024. Source: Oceania Rugby

=== Pacific Four ===
One qualifying spot is awarded to the highest finishing team in the 2024 Pacific Four Series that had not already qualified automatically (P4).

Pos	Team	Pld	W	D	L	PF	PA	PD	TF	TA	TB	LB	Pts	Qualification
1	Canada	3	3	0	0	105	40	+65	16	6	2	0	14	Automatically qualified via the previous World Cup
2	New Zealand	3	2	0	1	143	46	+97	23	7	2	1	11	Automatically qualified via the previous World Cup
3	United States	3	1	0	2	44	132	−88	7	22	1	0	5	Qualifies as P4
4	Australia	3	0	0	3	58	132	−74	9	21	1	1	2	Qualifies via WXV

Source: World Rugby

=== WXV ===
The final six spots in the World Cup would be awarded to the highest six finishers in the 2024 WXV who have not already qualified through other means.

2024 WXV standings

WXV 1

Pos	Team	Pld	W	D	L	PF	PA	PD	TF	TA	TB	LB	Pts	Qualification
1	England (C)	3	3	0	0	131	64	+67	21	10	2	0	14	Already qualified either directly or regionally
2	Ireland	3	2	0	1	63	62	+1	10	8	2	0	10	Already qualified either directly or regionally
3	Canada (H)	3	2	0	1	79	53	+26	12	8	1	0	9	Already qualified either directly or regionally
4	New Zealand	3	1	0	2	97	92	+5	15	16	2	1	7	Already qualified either directly or regionally
5	France	3	1	0	2	60	99	−39	9	16	1	0	5	Already qualified either directly or regionally
6	United States	3	0	0	3	49	109	−60	7	16	0	0	0	Already qualified either directly or regionally

Updated to match(es) played on 25 October 2024. Source: WXV 2024
(C) Champion; (H) Host
WXV 2

Pos	Team	Pld	W	D	L	PF	PA	PD	TF	TA	TB	LB	Pts	Qualification
1	Australia (C)	3	3	0	0	101	53	+48	15	10	3	0	15	Qualifies for RWC 2025
2	Scotland	3	2	0	1	60	44	+16	10	6	1	0	9	Qualifies for RWC 2025
3	Italy	3	2	0	1	31	43	−12	4	4	0	0	8	Qualifies for RWC 2025
4	South Africa (H)	3	1	0	2	76	80	−4	12	9	2	2	8	Already qualified either directly or regionally
5	Wales	3	1	0	2	29	55	−26	3	9	0	1	5	Qualifies for RWC 2025
6	Japan	3	0	0	3	47	69	−22	8	11	1	2	3	Already qualified either directly or regionally

Updated to match(es) played on 12th October 2024. Source: WXV 2024
(C) Champion; (H) Host
WXV 3

Pos	Team	Pld	W	D	L	PF	PA	PD	TF	TA	TB	LB	Pts	Qualification
1	Spain (C)	3	3	0	0	113	8	+105	17	1	2	0	14	Qualifies for RWC 2025
2	Samoa	3	2	1	0	99	40	+59	14	6	2	0	12	Qualifies for RWC 2025
3	Netherlands	3	1	1	1	41	31	+10	6	4	1	0	7	
4	Fiji	3	1	0	2	63	58	+5	10	7	1	1	6	Already qualified either directly or regionally
5	Hong Kong China	3	1	0	2	44	78	−34	6	12	1	0	5	
6	Madagascar	3	0	0	3	22	167	−145	3	26	0	0	0	

Updated to match(es) played on 12th October 2024. Source: WXV 2024
(C) Champion
