= Bianca Silva =

Brazilian rugby sevens player

- Born: 22 July 1998 (age 28)
- Height: 1.74 m (5 ft 9 in)
- Weight: 63 kg (139 lb; 9 st 13 lb)

Rugby union career
- Position: Wing
Senior career
Years	Team	Apps	(Points)
	Leoas de Paraisópolis		(0)
International career
Years	Team	Apps	(Points)
2025–	Brazil	6	(5)
- Correct as of 8 September 2025
National sevens team
Years	Team		Comps
- Brazil

Bianca dos Santos Silva (born 22 July 1998) is a Brazilian rugby union and sevens player. She competed for Brazil in the 2025 Women's Rugby World Cup.

== Rugby career ==
Silva competed in the women's tournament at the 2020 Summer Olympics. She represented Brazil at the 2022 Rugby World Cup Sevens in Cape Town, they placed eleventh overall.

She was named in the Brazilian women's sevens team that will compete at the 2024 Summer Olympics in Paris.

In 2025, she was named in Brazil's squad for the Women's Rugby World Cup in England. Silva scored her nation's first-ever Rugby World Cup try in their Pool game against France.
