= 2023 Americas Rugby Trophy =

Rugby union competition for women's national teams

Tournament details
- Host: Brazil
- Date: 3–11 June
- Countries: Brazil; Colombia; United States

Final positions
- Champions: United States (1st title)
- Runner-up: Colombia

Tournament statistics
- Matches played: 3
- Tries scored: 16 (5.33 per match)

The 2023 Americas Rugby Trophy was the first-ever sanctioned tournament for women's fifteens in the South American region. The competition ran from 3 to 11 June, and was hosted in Brazil. Brazil, Colombia, and the United States Under 23 team competed in the tournament.

The United States Under 23 team won the tournament after they conceded three fewer points to be crowned champions.

== Table ==
Position	Team	Matches				Points			Table Points
Position	Team	Played	Won	Drawn	Lost	For	Against	Diff	Table Points
1	United States U23	2	1	1	0	42	39	+3	6
2	Colombia	2	1	0	1	42	42	0	5
3	Brazil	2	0	1	1	30	33	–3	3

== Fixtures ==
3 June 2023	Brazil	15–15	United States U23	Estádio Nicolau Alayon, São Paulo
15:00 BRT (UTC-3)	Try: Ana Carolina Santana; Patrícia Lima; Con: Edna Santini (1); Pen: Patrícia Lima		Try: Kristin Bitter; Freda Tafuna; Con: Kristin Bitter (1); Pen: Kristin Bitter	Referee: Lucas Solda (Argentina)

7 June 2023	Colombia	24–27	United States U23	Estádio Nogueirão, Mogi das Cruzes
13:30 BRT (UTC-3)	Try: Leidy García; Yamileth Ramírez; Leidy Soto; Laura Gutierrez; Con: Valentina Tapias (1); Laura Mejía (1)		Try: Keia Mae Sagapolu; Mona Lisa Tupou; Sereana Vulaono; Con: Kristin Bitter (3); Pen: Kristin Bitter (2)	Referee: Lucas Solda (Argentina)

11 June 2023	Brazil	15–18	Colombia	Estadio Presidente Eurico Gaspar Dutrinha, Cuiabá
15:00 AMT (UTC-4)	Try: Tamires Costa; Lohana Valente; Ana Carolina Santana		Try: Paola Delgado; Juliana Soto; Con: Valentina Tapias (1); Pen: Valentina Tapias (2); Cards: Carolina Naranjo (red card) 22'	Referee: Victor Hugo Barboza (Brazil)

== Media ==
The tournament was streamed live on Brazil Rugby's YouTube channel.
