= Emiliano Caffera =

Uruguayan rugby union footballer and coach

- Full name: Emiliano Caffera
- Born: 30 October 1978 (age 48) Uruguay
- Height: 176 cm (5 ft 9 in)
- Weight: 80 kg (176 lb; 12 st 8 lb)

Rugby union career
- Position: Scrum-half
- Current team: Brazil and Brazil Women's
Senior career
Years	Team	Apps	(Points)
–	Champagnat		
- Correct as of 26 October 2023
International career
Years	Team	Apps	(Points)
2000-2010	Uruguay	35	(72)
- Correct as of 26 October 2023
Coaching career
- Years: Team
- Champagnat (head coach)
- Uruguay (backs coach)
- 20??-2023: Chile (defence coach)
- 2023-: Brazil (head coach)
- 2023-: Brazil Women's (head coach)
- Correct as of 26 October 2023

Emiliano Caffera (born 30 October 1978) is an Uruguayan rugby union former player and a current coach. He played as a scrum-half.

== Playing career ==
He played at Champagnat, in Uruguay.

He had 35 caps for Uruguay, from 2000 to 2010, scoring 12 conversions, 15 penalties and 1 drop goal, 72 points on aggregate. He was called for the 2003 Rugby World Cup, playing in two games but without scoring.

== Coaching career ==
After finishing his player career, he became a coach. He was the coach of Champagnat. He was also backs coach at Uruguay squad during the 2015 Rugby World Cup. He was defence coach for Chiles first ever World Cup in 2023. In October 2023 he was named head coach of Brazil's men and women's teams.
