= Kate Henwood =

NZ international rugby union player

- Born: 28 January 1989 (age 37) Whakatāne, Bay of Plenty, New Zealand
- Height: 175 cm (5 ft 9 in)
- Notable relative: Sam Henwood (brother)

Rugby union career
- Position: Prop
Provincial / State sides
Years	Team	Apps	(Points)
2015–2023	Bay of Plenty	28	(10)
Super Rugby
Years	Team	Apps	(Points)
2023–	Chiefs Manawa	18	(5)
International career
Years	Team	Apps	(Points)
2023–	New Zealand	14	(0)
Medal record
Women's rugby union
Representing New Zealand
World Cup
Bronze medal – third place	2025 England	Team competition

Kate Henwood (born 28 January 1989) is a New Zealand rugby union player. She plays for the Chiefs Manawa in the Super Rugby Aupiki competition.

== Personal life ==
Henwood worked as a management accountant at Control Tech Ltd, an electrical engineering company, in Whakatāne before she was offered a full-time contract in 2023. Her brother, Sam Henwood, previously played for the Chiefs, Hurricanes, and the Māori All Blacks.

== Rugby career ==
Henwood returned to top level rugby in 2022 for the Bay of Plenty in the Farah Palmer Cup after several seasons away from the game. She was called in as an injury replacement for the Chiefs Manawa for the 2023 Super Rugby Aupiki season.

Henwood was named in the Black Ferns 30-player squad to compete in the Pacific Four Series and O’Reilly Cup. She was named in the starting line up for her international debut against Australia on 29 June 2023 at Brisbane. In July, she featured in her sides 21–52 victory over Canada at the Pacific Four Series in Ottawa.

In July 2025, she was named in the Black Ferns side to the Women's Rugby World Cup in England.
