= Brazil women's national rugby union team =

Brazil
- Nickname: As Yaras
- Union: Brazilian Rugby Confederation
- Head coach: (Uruguay) Emiliano Caffera
- Captain: Eshyllen Coimbra
First colours	Second colours

World Rugby ranking
- Current: 25 (as of 1 December 2025)
- Highest: 25 (2025)
- Lowest: 51 (2023)

First international
- Netherlands 10–0 Brazil (Amsterdam; 10 May 2008)

Biggest win
- Brazil 58–7 Colombia (Estádio Nicolau Alayon, São Paulo; 14 June 2025)

Biggest defeat
- France 84–5 Brazil (Sandy Park, Exeter; 31 August 2025)

World Cup
- Appearances: 1 (first in 2025)

The Brazil women's national rugby union team are the national side of Brazil, representing them at rugby union. After several successful performances at Sevens rugby, they played their first 15-a-side fixture in May 2008 against Netherlands and lost 10–0.

== History ==
The first women's rugby match known in Brazil took place in 1987, during São Paulo Athletic Club's traditional end-of-year sevens tournament. Most of the players were the girlfriends and sisters of the men's team players, who always accompanied them to games and practices. In 1997, during Women's Day, another match took place in Florianópolis, in Desterro Rugby Clube. Maria Mikaella, former captain of the Brazilian National Team, played in that match, and made a little statement about how it was

"we didn't know the sport. In Brazil we didn't have rugby on TV or even a rugby ball to buy. We haven't heard about rugby until our friends began to play. We started just watching, but the sport seemed to be really cool to just watch. So we convinced the boys to teach us. The first game was messy. I just remember that we lost. However made us fall in love with rugby."

Brazil played their first international test match against the Netherlands in 2008. The team wasn't formed again until 2019, when Brazil visited Colombia for its first match against South American opposition. In 2020, Brazil and Colombia played again in Medellín, in a match that was the first one in a Women's Rugby World Cup qualifiers. Colombia defeated Brazil by 23–19.

=== 2023 ===
2023 will see Brazil face Colombia in official test matches, which is part of the South American region's qualifying matches for the 2025 Rugby World Cup. Sudamérica Rugby, with funding from World Rugby, organised the first women's fifteens tournament for the region, the 2023 Americas Rugby Trophy, which was hosted in Brazil in June. The tournament saw Brazil face Colombia, and a development team from the United States.

Brazil met Colombia again on 5 and 9 July 2023 in Medellín, for a place in the WXV 3 competition. They recorded their first international win when they beat Portugal 10–7, it was also their first time to face a European opponent after fifteen years.

=== 2024 ===
Brazil created history on 29 June 2024 by becoming the first South American team to qualify for a Women's Rugby World Cup. They defeated Colombia for the first time in Asunción, Paraguay and will make their debut at the 2025 Rugby World Cup in England. Brazil moved up 12 places to their highest position of 39th from 51st after their 34–13 win over Colombia.

=== 2025 ===
Brazil made history for their country when they qualified for the 2025 Women's Rugby World Cup in the South America play-off. They made their World Cup debut against South Africa on 24 August in Northampton and were overwhelmed by the Springbok Women 66–6. Rachel Kochhann scored all of Brazil’s points when she kicked two penalties. Their second match was against France, although they were defeated 84–5, Bianca Silva created history for her nation when she became the first Brazilian to score a try at a Rugby World Cup. Brazil ended their World Cup campaign with a third loss in their final match against Italy. They had a try disallowed and only managed three points, whereas Italy ran in twelve tries and successfully converted just two of the tries; the final score was 64–3.

== Results summary ==
(Full internationals only, updated to 31 August 2025)

Brazil Internationals From 2008
Opponent	First Match	Played	Won	Drawn	Lost	For	Against	Win %
Colombia	2019	8	2	0	6	192	168	25.00%
France	2025	1	0	0	1	5	84	0.00%
Netherlands	2008	5	1	0	4	49	75	0.00%
Portugal	2023	3	2	0	1	34	32	66.67%
Spain	2025	1	0	0	1	12	41	0.00%
South Africa	2025	1	0	0	1	6	66	0.00%
Summary	2008	19	5	0	14	298	463	26.32%

=== Rugby World Cup ===
Rugby World Cup
Year	Round	Position	GP	W	D	L	PF	PA
Brazil was not invited to any of the World Cups between 1991 and 2006
(England) 2010	Did Not Qualify							
(France) 2014	Did Not Qualify							
(Ireland) 2017	Did Not Qualify							
(New Zealand) 2021	Did Not Qualify							
(England) 2025	Pool Stage	—	3	0	0	3	14	214
Total	1/10	—	3	0	0	3	14	214
Champion Runner-up Third place Fourth place: * Tied placing ^{†} Best placing / Home venue

== Players ==
=== Current squad ===
On 28 July 2025, Brazil announced their final 32-player squad for their Women's Rugby World Cup debut in England.

Note: The age and number of caps listed for each player is as of 22 August 2025, the first day of the tournament.

Player	Position	Date of birth (age)	Caps	Club/province
Isabela Gomes Saccomanno	Hooker	16 October 1997 (aged 27)	9	(Brazil) São José
Júlia Leni Lima	Hooker	12 June 2004 (aged 21)	12	(Brazil) Curitiba
Natália Jonck	Hooker	13 December 1996 (aged 28)	2	(Australia) Brothers Rugby Club
Franciele Barros	Prop	8 May 1995 (aged 30)	11	(Portugal) Sporting
Giovana Mamede	Prop	21 April 2004 (aged 21)	2	(Brazil) Jacareí
Pâmela Santos	Prop	10 September 1992 (aged 32)	4	(Brazil) Charrua
Samara Vergara	Prop	20 February 1993 (aged 32)	8	(Brazil) Pasteur
Taís Prioste	Prop	9 April 1999 (aged 26)	10	(France) Bobigny
Ana Carolina Santana	Second row	8 July 1988 (aged 37)	4	(Brazil) Melina
Dayana Dakar	Second row	18 July 1997 (aged 28)	9	(Brazil) Niterói
Eshyllen Coimbra (c)	Second row	18 August 2000 (aged 25)	14	(Brazil) Elshaddai
Camilla Ísis Carvalho	Back row	30 June 2002 (aged 23)	3	(Brazil) Elshaddai
Íris Coluna	Back row	21 July 1990 (aged 35)	8	(Brazil) Poli
Larissa Carvalho	Back row	31 May 2003 (aged 22)	8	(Brazil) Curitiba
Larissa Henwood	Back row	24 January 1994 (aged 31)	6	(New Zealand) Counties Manukau
Letícia Medeiros	Back row	19 December 1994 (aged 30)	9	(Brazil) Jacareí
Letícia Silva	Back row	29 December 2005 (aged 19)	5	(Brazil) Melina
Marcelle Souza	Back row	22 July 1996 (aged 29)	4	(Brazil) Elshaddai
Aline Bednarski	Scrum-half	24 April 1996 (aged 29)	11	(Brazil) Pasteur
Luiza Campos	Scrum-half	30 July 1990 (aged 35)	10	(Brazil) Charrua
Leila Silva	Scrum-half	23 October 1996 (aged 28)	3	(Brazil) Leoas de Paraisópolis
Fernanda Tenório	Fly-half	11 April 2002 (aged 23)	8	(Brazil) Elshaddai
Maria Gabriela Graf	Fly-half	2 December 1995 (aged 29)	4	(Australia) Brothers Rugby Club
Raquel Kochhann	Fly-half	6 October 1992 (aged 32)	6	(Brazil) Charrua
Carolyne Katrine Pereira	Centre	8 July 2003 (aged 22)	3	(Brazil) Melina
Edna Santini	Centre	15 July 1992 (aged 33)	9	(Brazil) São José
Mariana Nicolau	Centre	16 November 1997 (aged 27)	3	(Brazil) São José
Marina Fioravanti	Centre	6 October 1993 (aged 31)	5	(Brazil) Poli
Giovanna Barth	Wing	15 March 2004 (aged 21)	4	(Brazil) Maringá
Bianca Silva	Wing	22 July 1998 (aged 27)	3	(Brazil) Leoas de Paraisópolis
Isadora Lopes	Wing	3 August 1997 (aged 28)	7	(Brazil) Melina
Yasmim Soares	Fullback	5 May 1999 (aged 26)	3	(Brazil) Melina

== See also ==
- Rugby union in Brazil
- Associação Brasileira de Rugby
