= Colombia women's national rugby union team =

Colombia
- Nickname: Las Tucanes
- Union: Federación Colombiana de Rugby
- Head coach: Luis Pedro Achard
- Captain: Leidy Soto
First colours

World Rugby ranking
- Current: 29 (as of 2 March 2026)
- Highest: 25 (2023)
- Lowest: 30 (2025)

First international
- Colombia 28–7 Brazil (Medellín, Colombia; 25 August 2019)

Biggest win
- Colombia 96–0 Trinidad and Tobago (Medellín, Colombia; 15 June 2024)

Biggest defeat
- Ireland 64–3 Colombia (Dubai, United Arab Emirates; 21 October 2023)

The Colombia women's rugby team (also known by their nickname Las Tucanes) represents Colombia in women's Rugby union internationally.

== History ==
Colombia's Development XV's team played two matches against Venezuela in San Cristóbal, Venezuela on the 21 and 23 November 2014. They won both games 30–0 and 25–5.

On 25 August 2019 Colombia beat Brazil 28–7 in Medellín, Colombia.

Colombia kept their Rugby World Cup 2021 dreams alive after they beat Brazil 23–19 in their Sudamérica face-off. They advanced into the next stage of qualification for the World Cup in a South America/Africa play-off against Kenya. They defeated Kenya 16–15 and earned a spot at a repechage tournament that will decide the final team to qualify for the 2021 Rugby World Cup. Colombia defeated Kazakhstan 18–10 in their semifinal match. They lost to Scotland in their Final Qualification Tournament and missed out on qualifying for the World Cup.

=== 2023 ===
Colombia and Brazil had official test matches in 2023, as part of the South American region’s qualifying matches for the 2025 Rugby World Cup. In 2023, Sudamérica Rugby, with funding from World Rugby, organised the first women's fifteens tournament for the region, the 2023 Americas Rugby Trophy, was hosted in Brazil. The tournament saw Colombia face Brazil, and a development team from the United States.

Colombia played Brazil twice on the 5 and 9 July 2023 in Medellín, for a place in the WXV 3 competition. Colombia defeated Brazil and won on aggregate points to secure a spot in the inaugural WXV 3 as South America 1. They lost all their matches and will now face the Netherlands to decide who returns to the WXV 3 competition in 2024.

=== 2024 ===
Luis Pedro Achard was appointed to oversee the men's and women's national teams. On 15 June 2024, Colombia handed Trinidad and Tobago their biggest defeat when they met at Estadio Cincuentenario in Medellín, when they ran in 15 unanswered tries to end the game 96–0.

Colombia played Brazil in the first South American qualifier for the Women’s Rugby World Cup on 29 June 2024. They failed to qualify for the 2025 Rugby World Cup in England after losing to Brazil 13–34 in Asunción, Paraguay.

== Records ==
(Full internationals only, updated to 8 november 2025)

Colombia Internationals From 2019
Opponent	First Match	Played	Won	Drawn	Lost	For	Against	Win %
Brazil	2019	8	6	0	2	168	192	75.00%
Chile	2026	1	1	0	0	28	19	100.00%
Fiji	2023	1	0	0	1	13	67	0.00%
Hong Kong	2023	1	0	0	1	28	31	0.00%
Ireland	2023	1	0	0	1	3	64	0.00%
Kazakhstan	2022	1	1	0	0	18	10	100.00%
Kenya	2021	2	1	0	1	21	36	50.00%
Mexico	2025	1	1	0	0	65	5	100.00%
Netherlands	2024	1	0	0	1	11	33	0.00%
Scotland	2022	1	0	0	1	3	59	0.00%
Trinidad and Tobago	2024	1	1	0	0	96	0	100.00%
Summary	2019	19	11	0	8	454	516	57.89%

== Players ==
Colombia named their 30-player squad on 21 September 2023 for the inaugural WXV 3 tournament that will take place in Dubai.

Player	Position	Date of birth (age)	Caps	Club/province
Camila Cardona	??	{{{age}}}		[[]]
Carolina Naranjo	??	{{{age}}}		[[]]
Daniela Roman	??	{{{age}}}		[[]]
Tatiana Delgado	??	{{{age}}}		[[]]
Gisel Gómez	??	{{{age}}}		[[]]
Leidy Garcia	??	{{{age}}}		[[]]
María Cortes	??	{{{age}}}		[[]]
Natalia Caycedo	??	{{{age}}}		[[]]
Velentina Yepes	??	{{{age}}}		[[]]
Angie Manyoma	??	{{{age}}}		[[]]
Tatiana Hernandez	??	{{{age}}}		[[]]
Paola Delgado	??	{{{age}}}		[[]]
Sara Vélez	??	{{{age}}}		[[]]
Silvia Olave	??	{{{age}}}		[[]]
Sofía Granados	??	{{{age}}}		[[]]
Camila Lopera	??	18 April 1995 (aged 28)		[[]]
Isabel Ramirez	??	{{{age}}}		[[]]
Juliana Soto	??	{{{age}}}		[[]]
Laura Gutierrez	??	{{{age}}}		[[]]
Maribel Mestra	??	{{{age}}}		[[]]
Melisa Rios	??	{{{age}}}		[[]]
Stefanía Sarmiento	??	{{{age}}}		[[]]
Valentina Álvarez	??	{{{age}}}		[[]]
Valeria Cuartas	??	{{{age}}}		[[]]
Ángela Alzate	??	{{{age}}}		[[]]
Luisa Zurique	??	{{{age}}}		[[]]
María Arzuaga	??	{{{age}}}		[[]]
Andrea Ramirez	??	{{{age}}}		[[]]
Natalia Barajas	??	{{{age}}}		[[]]
Alejandra Villota	??	{{{age}}}		[[]]

== Coaches ==
Name	Years
Lissete Martinez	?–2023
Luis Pedro Achard	2024–

== See also ==
- Rugby union in Colombia
