= 2017–18 World Rugby Women's Sevens Series squads =

World Rugby Women's Sevens 2017–18 squads Series VI
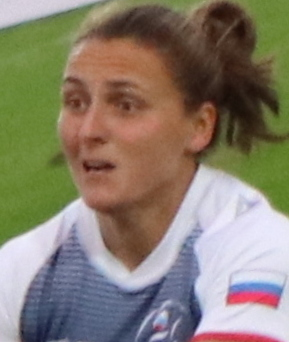
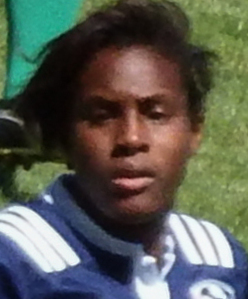
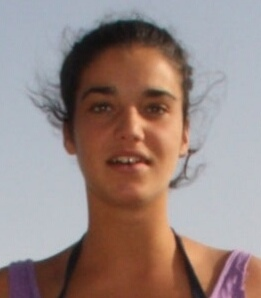
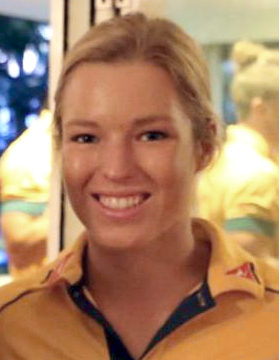
- Players in Series VI. Clockwise from top left: Marina Kukina of Russia, Naya Tapper of the United States, Emma Tonegato of Australia and Montserrat Amédée of France.

This is a list of the complete squads for the 2017–18 World Rugby Women's Sevens Series.

Captains for a tournament have their number marked in bold.

== Australia ==
Coach:

- (Australia) Tim Walsh (to Sydney)
- (Australia) John Manenti (Kitakyushu onwards)

Australia team members 2017–18
Player	Apps	Position	Number				
Player	Apps	Position	Dubai	Sydney	Kitakyushu	Langford	Paris
Lauren Brown	3	Back	–	–	7	10	10
Charlotte Caslick	4	Back	7	7	–	7	7
Emilee Cherry	5	Back	11	11	11	11	11
Dominique Du Toit	5	Back	4	4	4	4	4
Georgina Friedrichs	4	Forward	3	3	12	12	–
Demi Hayes	3	Forward	–	–	3	3	3
Page McGregor	3	Back	10	–	–	8	8
Yasmin Meakes	3	Forward	–	–	2	2	2
Mahalia Murphy	2	Forward	8	8	–	–	–
Shannon Parry	5	Forward	**1**	**1**	**1**	**1**	**1**
Evania Pelite	5	Back	6	6	6	6	6
Alicia Quirk	2	Back	–	10	10	–	–
Cassie Staples	4	Forward	12	12	8	–	12
Emma Sykes	5	Back	9	9	9	9	9
Emma Tonegato	5	Back	5	5	5	5	5
Sharni Williams	2	Forward	**2**	**2**	–	–	–

== Canada ==
Coach: (Canada) John Tait

Canada team members 2017–18
Player	Apps	Position	Number				
Player	Apps	Position	Dubai	Sydney	Kitakyushu	Langford	Paris
Olivia Apps	3		–	6	12	–	12
Brittany Benn	4		1	1	**1**	–	1
Pam Buisa	2		–	–	–	1	5
Emma Chown	1		6	–	–	–	–
Caroline Crossley	5		3	3	3	3	3
Hannah Darling	5		10	10	10	10	10
Bianca Farella	3		–	–	8	8	8
Julia Greenshields	4		5	5	5	5	–
Sara Kaljuvee	3		–	–	7	7	7
Jen Kish	2		7	7	–	–	–
Ghislaine Landry	4		**9**	**9**	–	**9**	**9**
Tausani Levale	2		8	8	–	–	–
Megan Lukan	4		12	12	9	12	–
Kayla Moleschi	5		2	2	2	2	2
Breanne Nicholas	5		4	4	4	4	4
Natasha Watcham-Roy	5		11	11	11	11	11
Charity Williams	3		–	–	6	6	6

== England ==
Coach: (England) James Bailey

England team members 2017–18
Player	Apps	Position	Number				
Player	Apps	Position	Dubai	Sydney	Kitakyushu	Langford	Paris
Holly Aitchison	3	Back	11	11	–	–	11
Claire Allan	3	Back	**1**	–	1	–	1
Jess Breach	2	Back	–	1	11	–	–
Abbie Brown	4	Forward	–	2	**2**	**2**	**2**
Heather Fisher	5	Forward	7	7	7	7	7
Vicky Fleetwood	3	Back	–	–	10	10	10
Deborah Fleming	5	Forward	6	6	6	6	6
Natasha Hunt	1	Back	–	–	5	–	–
Megan Jones	2	Back	10	10	–	–	–
Olivia Jones	1	Back	–	–	–	1	–
Katie Mason	2	Back	4	–	–	11	–
Alex Matthews	5	Forward	2	9	9	9	9
Sarah McKenna	3	Back	–	5	–	12	5
Chantelle Miell	2	Forward	9	–	–	5	–
Emily Scarratt	3	Back	5	**4**	–	–	4
Emily Scott	5	Back	8	8	8	8	8
Lydia Thompson	4	Back	3	3	3	3	–
Amy Wilson-Hardy	4	Forward	12	12	12	–	12
Millie Wood	3	Back	–	–	4	4	3

== Fiji ==
Coach: (Fiji) Iliesa Tanivula

Fiji team members 2017–18
Player	Apps	Position	Number				
Player	Apps	Position	Dubai	Sydney	Kitakyushu	Langford	Paris
Naina Baleca	1	Forward	–	3	–	–	–
Lavena Cavuru	2	Back	5	–	11	–	–
Merewai Cumu	3	Forward	1	–	–	5	5
Raijieli Daveua	2	Back	–	–	–	7	7
Rusila Nagasau	3	Forward	10	10	7	–	–
Ana Maria Naimasi	5	Back	2	2	3	3	3
Miriama Naiobasali	4	Forward	–	4	2	2	2
Litia Naiqato	3	Forward	3	1	1	–	–
Aloessi Nakoci	1	Back	–	7	–	–	–
Timaima Ravisa	5	Back	12	12	12	12	12
Viniana Riwai	5	Back	11	11	4	4	4
Ana Maria Roqica	5	Back	**8**	**8**	**8**	**8**	**8**
Jiowana Sauto	2	Forward	–	–	–	11	11
Asinate Savu	2	Forward	–	5	–	1	1
Pricilla Saivavi Siata	4	Forward	6	–	6	6	6
Vasiti Kuma Solikoviti	2	Forward	4	–	5	–	–
Lavenia Tinai	4	Back	9	9	9	–	9
Luisa Tisolo	3	Back	7	–	10	10	–
Mereula Torooti	1	Back	–	–	–	9	–
Vilisi Vakaloloma	2	Back	–	6	–	–	10

== France ==
Coach: (France) David Courteix

France team members 2017–18
Player	Apps	Position	Number				
Player	Apps	Position	Dubai	Sydney	Kitakyushu	Langford	Paris
Montserrat Amedee	4	Back	5	5	5	5	–
Coralie Bertrand	5	Back	12	12	11	11	7
Pauline Biscarat	3	Back	4	4	–	4	–
Anna-Cécile Ciofani	4	Forward	7	–	2	2	2
Mathilde Coutouly	1	Forward	–	11	–	–	–
Caroline Drouin	4	Forward	–	1	10	10	10
Camille Grassineau	5	Back	8	8	8	8	8
Lina Guerin	4	Back	–	7	12	12	12
Fanny Horta	5	Forward	**6**	**6**	**6**	**6**	**6**
Shannon Izar	2	Back	11	–	–	–	11
Nassira Konde	1	Back	–	–	4	–	–
Jade Le Pesq	3	Forward	10	–	9	9	–
Marjorie Mayans	4	Forward	1	–	1	1	1
Konde Nassira	2	Forward	–	10	–	–	–
Carla Niesen	2	Back	9	9	–	–	–
Seraphine Okemba	3	Back	2	2	7	–	–
Chloe Pelle	5	Forward	3	3	3	3	3
Joanna Sainlo	1	Back	–	–	–	–	9
Charlotte Torres-Duxans	1	Back	–	–	–	–	4
Jessy Tremouliere	2	Back	–	–	–	7	5

== Ireland ==
Coach: (Ireland) Anthony Eddy

Ireland team members 2017–18
Player	Apps	Position	Number				
Player	Apps	Position	Dubai	Sydney	Kitakyushu	Langford	Paris
Kathy Baker	3	Forward	–	–	4	4	4
Ashleigh Baxter	5	Forward	6	6	6	6	6
Claire Boles	3	Forward	4	4	–	12	–
Aoife Doyle	3	Back	8	8	–	–	8
Katie Fitzhenry	5	Forward	7	7	7	7	7
Stacey Flood	5	Back	3	3	3	3	3
Louise Galvin	5	Back	11	11	11	11	11
Katie Heffernan	3	Back	–	2	12	–	12
Eve Higgins	3	Back	10	10	10	10	10
Lucy Mulhall	3	Back	**9**	**9**	**9**	**9**	**9**
Amee-Leigh Murphy-Crowe	3	Back	5	5	5	5	5
Deirbhile Nic a Bhaird	3	Forward	12	12	8	8	1
Audrey O'Flynn	4	Forward	1	1	1	1	–
Hannah Tyrrell	4	Back	2	–	2	2	2

== Japan ==
Coach: (Japan) Hitoshi Inada

Japan team members 2017–18
Player	Apps	Position	Number				
Player	Apps	Position	Dubai	Sydney	Kitakyushu	Langford	Paris
Raichierumiyo Bativakalolo	4	Forward	–	3	3	3	3
Yume Hirano	5	Back	10	10	10	10	10
Mifuyu Koide	4	Back	–	11	11	11	11
Tomomi Kozasa	4	Forward	7	7	7	7	–
Ano Kuwai	3	Forward	2	2	–	–	7
Iroha Nagata	3	Forward	8	–	8	8	8
Aya Nakajima	1	Forward	–	8	–	–	–
Chiharu Nakamura	5	Back	**1**	**1**	**1**	**1**	**1**
Yume Okuroda	3	Forward	9	–	–	4	4
Fumiko Otake	4	Back	–	5	5	5	5
Mayu Shimizu	1	Back	5	–	–	–	–
Sayaka Suzuki	5	Back	6	6	6	6	6
Emii Tanaka	5	Back	12	12	12	12	12
Noriko Taniguchi	3	Forward	–	–	2	2	2
Yukari Tateyama	5	Back	3	9	9	9	9
Honoka Tsutsumi	1	Back	11	–	–	–	–
Chisato Yoko	3	Forward	4	4	4	–	–

== New Zealand ==
Coach: (New Zealand) Allan Bunting

New Zealand team members 2017–18
Player	Apps	Position	Number				
Player	Apps	Position	Dubai	Sydney	Kitakyushu	Langford	Paris
Shakira Baker	3	Forward	–	–	2	2	–
Michaela Blyde	5	Back	6	6	6	6	6
Kelly Brazier	4	Back	–	8	8	8	8
Gayle Broughton	4	Back	8	9	9	–	9
Theresa Fitzpatrick	5	Back	10	10	10	10	10
Sarah Goss	5	Forward	**5**	**5**	**5**	**5**	**5**
Huia Harding	1	Forward	–	–	1	–	–
Kayla McAlister	1	Back	12	–	–	–	–
Tyla Nathan-Wong	5	Back	7	7	7	7	7
Alena Saili	2	Forward	2	2	–	–	–
Shiray Kaka	1	Forward	–	–	–	–	2
Terina Te Tamaki	1	Back	–	–	–	9	–
Ruby Tui	4	Forward	1	1	–	1	1
Stacey Waaka	5	Back	3	3	3	3	3
Kat Whata-Simpkins	1	Forward	9	–	–	–	–
Niall Williams	5	Back	4	4	4	4	4
Tenika Willison	4	Forward	–	12	12	12	12
Portia Woodman	5	Forward	11	11	11	11	11

== Russia ==
Coach: (Russia) Andrey Kuzin

Russia team members 2017–18
Player	Apps	Position	Number				
Player	Apps	Position	Dubai	Sydney	Kitakyushu	Langford	Paris
Aleksandra Aliseenko	1		–	–	–	3	–
Alina Arterchuk	1		–	–	–	4	–
Anna Baranchuk	3	Forward	–	–	3	11	9
Daria Bobkova	3	Forward	3	3	–	–	3
Polina Buravleva	2	Back	–	9	–	12	–
Arina Bystrova	4	Forward	11	11	11	–	11
Iana Danilova	2	Back	–	–	–	5	8
Anna Gavrilyuk	5	Forward	6	6	6	6	6
Diana Glushenko	1		–	–	–	2	–
Aleksandra Kazantseva	1		–	–	–	7	–
Baizat Khamidova	4	Forward	5	5	5	–	5
Marina Kukina	4	Back	8	8	8	8	–
Snezhanna Kulkova	3	Back	9	–	9	9	–
Daria Lushina	4	Back	2	2	2	–	2
Alena Mikhaltsova	4	Back	**4**	**4**	**4**	–	**4**
Daria Noritsina	5	Back	1	1	1	**1**	1
Maria Perestiak	4	Back	12	12	12	–	12
Anastasia Prokudina	1		–	–	–	10	–
Kristina Seredina	4	Forward	7	7	7	–	7
Elena Zdrokova	4	Back	10	10	10	–	10

== Spain ==
Coach: (Spain) Pedro de Matías

Spain team members 2017–18
Player	Apps	Position	Number				
Player	Apps	Position	Dubai	Sydney	Kitakyushu	Langford	Paris
Eva Aguirre	1	Forward	–	8	–	–	–
Maria Ahis	1	Back	–	–	10	–	–
Ingrid Algar	3	Back	–	1	8	6	–
Uri Barrutieta	5	Forward	2	2	2	2	2
Marina Bravo	5	Forward	5	5	5	5	5
Teresa Bueso	1	Back	–	–	–	–	10
Enara Cacho	1	Forward	–	–	–	10	–
María Casado	5	Back	9	9	9	9	9
Iera Echebarría	5	Back	11	11	11	11	11
Amaia Erbina	5	Back	3	3	3	3	3
Anne Fernández de Corres	2	Back	10	10	–	–	–
Olivia Fresneda	1	Back	–	–	–	–	1
Patricia García	5	Back	4	4	4	4	4
Sabina Hurtado	3	Forward	8	–	–	8	8
María Losada	3	Back	1	–	1	1	–
Elisabet Martínez	4	Forward	6	6	6	–	6
Bárbara Plà	5	Back	**7**	**7**	**7**	**7**	**7**
María Ribera	5	Forward	12	12	12	12	12

== United States ==
Coach: (United States) Richie Walker

United States team members 2017–18
Player	Apps	Position	Number				
Player	Apps	Position	Dubai	Sydney	Kitakyushu	Langford	Paris
Tia Blythe	2	Back	10	10	–	–	–
Sarah Buonopane	4	Back	11	11	12	11	–
Kayla Canett	2	Back	–	–	–	8	8
Ryan Carlyle	5	Forward	2	2	5	4	4
Lauren Doyle	2	Back	–	–	–	9	9
Cheta Emba	4	Forward	–	5	3	2	2
Joanne Fa'avesi	2	Forward	–	–	–	5	5
Megan Foster	1	Back	5	–	–	–	–
Jordan Gray	5	Forward	1	1	1	1	1
Kelly Griffin	1	Forward	–	–	2	–	–
Abby Gustaitis	4	Forward	3	3	–	3	3
Nicole Heavirland	5	Back	**4**	**4**	**4**	**6**	**6**
Alev Kelter	5	Back	6	6	6	10	10
Natalie Kosko	1	Back	–	9	–	–	–
Ilona Maher	1	Back	–	–	–	–	7
Saskia Morgan	2	Back	12	12	–	–	–
Sara Parsons	1	Forward	8	–	–	–	–
Neariah Persinger	1	Back	–	–	9	–	–
Hope Rogers	2	Forward	–	8	8	–	–
Kelsi Stockert	1	Forward	9	–	–	–	–
Naya Tapper	5	Back	7	7	7	12	12
Kristen Thomas	2	Back	–	–	11	–	11
Katherine Zackary	2	Back	–	–	9	7	–

== Non-core teams ==
One place in each tournament of the series is allocated to a national team based on performance in the respective continental tournaments within Africa, Asia, Europe, Oceania, and the Americas.

=== Brazil ===
Coach: (New Zealand) Reuben Samuel

Brazil team for Langford 2018
Number	Player	Position
1	Eshyllen Cardoso	
2	Haline Scatrut	
3	Rafaela Zanellato	
4	Leila Silva	
5	Júlia Rodrigues	
6	Isadora Cerullo	
7	Amanda Araújo	
8	Isadora Lopes	
9	Milena Mariano	
10	Raquel Kochhann	
11	Bianca Silva	
12	Mariana Nicolau	

=== China ===
Coach: (China) Lu Zhuan

China team for Kitakyushu 2018
Number	Player	Position
1	Yu Liping	
2	Hu Yu	
3	Lu Yuanyuan	
4	Tong Xueqin	
**5**	Yan Meiling	
6	Wang Wanyu	
7	Chen Keyi	
8	Gao Yueying	
9	Sun Caihong	
10	Liu Xiaoqian	
11	Yu Xiaoming	
12	Yang Min	

=== Papua New Guinea ===
Coach: (Papua New Guinea) Larry John

Papua New Guinea team for Sydney 2018
Number	Player	Position
1	Gemma Schnaubelt	Back
2	Chelsea Garesa	Back
3	Mavis Mitaharo	Back
4	Taiva Lavai	Back
5	Marie Biyama	Back
6	Melanie Kawa	Forward
7	Fatima Rama	Back
8	Geua Larry	Forward
9	Lynette Kwarula	Forward
**10**	Debbie Kaore	Forward
11	Freda Waula	Back
12	Isi Govea	Forward

=== South Africa ===
Coach: (South Africa) Renfred Dazel

South Africa team for Dubai 2017
Number	Player	Position
1	Unathi Mali	Back
2	Christelene Steinhoebel	Forward
3	Chane Stadler	Back
4	Zintle Mpupha	Back
5	Eloise Webb	Forward
**6**	Veroeshka Grain	Back
7	Phumeza Gadu	Back
8	Megan Comley	Forward
9	Nadine Roos	Back
10	Mathrin Simmers	Back
11	Jacqueline Kriel	Forward
12	Marithy Pienaar	Forward

=== Wales ===
Coach: (Wales) Nick Wakley

Wales team for Paris 2018
Number	Player	Position
1	Jasmine Joyce	
2	Lucy Packer	
3	Kayleigh Powell	
4	Elinor Snowsill	
5	Alisha Butchers	
6	Hannah Jones	
7	Bethan Lewis	
8	Jessica Kavanagh-Williams	
9	Alex Callender	
10	Sian Williams	
11	Gemma Rowland	
12	Shona Powell Hughes	

== See also ==
- 2017–18 World Rugby Sevens Series squads (for men)
