= 2018 Rugby World Cup Sevens squads – Women =

The rosters of all participating teams at the women's tournament of the 2018 Rugby World Cup Sevens.

== Australia ==
Head coach: John Manenti

No.	Pos.	Player	Date of birth (age)	Union / Club
1	FW	Shannon Parry (co-c)	October 27, 1989 (aged 28)	Queensland
2	FW	Sharni Williams (co-c)	March 2, 1988 (aged 30)	ACT
3	FW	Demi Hayes	May 25, 1998 (aged 20)	Queensland
4	BK	Page McGregor	March 11, 1999 (aged 19)	New South Wales
5	BK	Emma Tonegato	March 20, 1995 (aged 23)	New South Wales
6	BK	Evania Pelite	July 12, 1995 (aged 23)	Queensland
7	BK	Charlotte Caslick	March 9, 1995 (aged 23)	Queensland
8	FW	Yasmin Meakes	March 25, 1994 (aged 24)	ACT
9	FW	Cassie Staples	October 16, 1992 (aged 25)	New South Wales
10	BK	Alicia Quirk	March 28, 1992 (aged 26)	New South Wales
11	BK	Emilee Cherry	November 2, 1992 (aged 25)	Queensland
12	BK	Ellia Green	February 20, 1993 (aged 25)	Victoria
13	BK	Lauren Brown	April 18, 1995 (aged 23)	Queensland

== Brazil ==
Head coach: Reuben Samuel

No.	Pos.	Player	Date of birth (age)	Union / Club
1		Marcelle Souza	July 22, 1996 (aged 21)	Guanabara
2		Mariana Nicolau	November 16, 1997 (aged 20)	Charrua
3		Rafaela Zanellato	November 25, 1999 (aged 18)	Curitiba
4		Leila Silva	October 23, 1996 (aged 21)	Leoas de Paraisopolis
5		Aline Ribeiro	October 2, 1995 (aged 22)	USP
6	BK	Isadora Cerullo	March 24, 1991 (aged 27)	Niterói
7	FW	Amanda Araújo	February 23, 1990 (aged 28)	Niterói
8	FW	Beatriz Futuro	February 26, 1986 (aged 32)	Niterói
9	BK	Haline Scatrut	August 9, 1992 (aged 25)	Curitiba
10	BK	Raquel Kochhann (c)	October 6, 1992 (aged 25)	Charrua
11		Bianca Silva	July 22, 1998 (aged 19)	Leoas de Paraisopolis
12		Milena Silva	January 28, 2000 (aged 18)	São José

== Canada ==
Head coach: John Tait

No.	Pos.	Player	Date of birth (age)	Union / Club
1	BK	Brittany Benn	April 23, 1989 (aged 29)	Guelph Redcoats
2	BK	Kayla Moleschi	November 25, 1990 (aged 27)	Williams Lake Rustlers
3	BK	Caroline Crossley	April 19, 1998 (aged 20)	Castaway Wanderers
4	BK	Breanne Nicholas	February 20, 1994 (aged 24)	London St. Georges RFC
5	BK	Julia Greenshields	February 12, 1992 (aged 26)	Sarnia Saints
6	BK	Charity Williams	October 20, 1992 (aged 25)	Markham Irish
7	FW	Sara Kaljuvee	February 7, 1993 (aged 25)	Toronto Scottish
8	FW	Bianca Farella	April 10, 1992 (aged 26)	Town of Mount Royal RCF
9	BK	Ghislaine Landry (c)	April 27, 1988 (aged 30)	Toronto Scottish
10	FW	Olivia Apps	December 1, 1998 (aged 19)	Lindsay RFC
11	BK	Natasha Watcham-Roy	April 28, 1992 (aged 26)	Hull Volant
12	FW	Pam Buisa	December 28, 1996 (aged 21)	Ottawa Irish

== China ==
Head coach: Chad Shepherd

No.	Pos.	Player	Date of birth (age)	Union / Club
1		Ruan Hongting	October 6, 1995 (aged 22)	Shandong
2		Yang Min	November 4, 1994 (aged 23)	Jiangsu
3		Yu Liping	December 22, 1993 (aged 24)	Shandong
4		Yang Feifei	October 5, 1997 (aged 20)	Shandong
5		Yan Meiling (c)	January 14, 1997 (aged 21)	Jiangsu
6		Wang Wanyu	February 14, 1997 (aged 21)	Jiangsu
7		Chen Keyi	July 23, 1995 (aged 22)	Sichuan
8		Liu Xiaoqian	February 16, 1996 (aged 22)	Shandong
9		Hu Yu	April 9, 1999 (aged 19)	Jiangsu
10		Gao Yueying	August 4, 1997 (aged 20)	Jiangsu
11		Yu Xiaoming	November 8, 1993 (aged 24)	Shandong
12		Sun Caihong	June 4, 1997 (aged 21)	Jiangsu

== England ==
Head coach: James Bailey

No.	Pos.	Player	Date of birth (age)	Union / Club
1	BK	Claire Allan	May 7, 1985 (aged 33)	Unattached
2	BK	Abbie Brown (c)	April 10, 1996 (aged 22)	Unattached
3	BK	Sarah McKenna	March 23, 1989 (aged 29)	Unattached
4	FW	Emily Scarratt	February 8, 1990 (aged 28)	Unattached
5	BK	Natasha Hunt	March 21, 1989 (aged 29)	Unattached
6	FW	Deborah Fleming	June 10, 1991 (aged 27)	Unattached
7	FW	Heather Fisher	June 13, 1984 (aged 34)	Unattached
8	FW	Victoria Fleetwood	April 13, 1990 (aged 28)	Unattached
9	FW	Alex Matthews	August 3, 1993 (aged 24)	Unattached
10	BK	Jess Breach	November 4, 1997 (aged 20)	Harlequins
11	BK	Holly Aitchison	September 13, 1997 (aged 20)	Unattached
12	FW	Amy Wilson-Hardy	September 13, 1991 (aged 26)	Unattached

== Fiji ==
Head coach: Iliesa Tanivula

No.	Pos.	Player	Date of birth (age)	Union / Club
1	FW	Asinate Savu	April 15, 1993 (aged 25)	Seahawks
2	BK	Ana Maria Naimasi	February 21, 1994 (aged 24)	Striders
3	BK	Luisa Tisolo	September 2, 1991 (aged 26)	Striders
4	BK	Viniana Riwai	June 6, 1991 (aged 27)	Seahawks
5	BK	Mereula Torooti	May 4, 1988 (aged 30)	Seahawks
6	BK	Raijieli Daveua	May 30, 1992 (aged 26)	Wardens
7	FW	Merewai Cumu	August 3, 1997 (aged 20)	Nadi Blazers
8	BK	Ana Maria Roqica (c)	February 2, 1988 (aged 30)	Seahawks
9	FW	Pricilla Sauvavi Siata	May 13, 1986 (aged 32)	Central Chiefs
10	FW	Miriama Naiobasali	December 30, 1995 (aged 22)	Seahawks
11	FW	Rusila Nagasau	August 4, 1987 (aged 30)	Seahawks
12	BK	Tinaima Ravisa	May 1, 1988 (aged 30)	Striders

== France ==
Head coach: David Courteix

No.	Pos.	Player	Date of birth (age)	Union / Club
1	FW	Marjorie Mayans	November 17, 1990 (aged 27)	Blagnac Femenin, FFR since 2014
2	FW	Anna-Cécile Ciofani	December 14, 1996 (aged 21)	AC Bobigny 93
3	FW	Chloé Pelle	November 14, 1989 (aged 28)	Lille MRCV
4	BK	Carla Neisen	March 8, 1996 (aged 22)	Blagnac Femenin
5	BK	Montserrat Amédée	May 13, 1996 (aged 22)	Montpellier, FFR since 2015
6	BK/FW	Fanny Horta (c)	January 22, 1986 (aged 32)	USAP XV féminin, FFR since 2014
7	BK/FW	Coralie Bertrand	April 10, 1994 (aged 24)	Toulouse
8	BK	Camille Grassineau	September 10, 1990 (aged 27)	Stade Français, FFR since 2014
9	FW	Joanna Sainlo	November 2, 1982 (aged 35)	AC Bobigny 93
10	BK	Caroline Drouin	July 7, 1996 (aged 22)	Stade rennais rugby
11	BK	Shannon Izar	May 8, 1993 (aged 25)	Lille MRCV, FFR since 2014
12	BK	Lina Guérin	April 16, 1991 (aged 27)	AS Marcoussis, FFR since 2014
13	BK/FW	Läurelin Fourcade	September 4, 1988 (aged 29)	Stade Français, FFR since 2015

== Ireland ==
Head coach: Anthony Eddy

No.	Pos.	Player	Date of birth (age)	Union / Club
1	FW	Audrey O'Flynn	February 20, 1987 (aged 31)	IRFU
2	BK	Hannah Tyrrell	August 10, 1990 (aged 27)	Old Belvedere
3	BK	Stacey Flood	August 5, 1996 (aged 21)	Railway Union
4	FW	Kathy Baker	July 6, 1994 (aged 24)	Blackrock
5	BK	Amee-Leigh Murphy-Crowe	April 26, 1995 (aged 23)	Railway Union
6	FW	Ashleigh Baxter	December 21, 1991 (aged 26)	Cooke
7	FW	Katie Fitzhenry	April 23, 1989 (aged 29)	Blackrock
8	BK	Aoife Doyle	June 2, 1995 (aged 23)	Shannon
9	BK	Lucy Mulhall (c)	September 29, 1993 (aged 24)	Rathdrum
10	BK	Eve Higgins	June 23, 1999 (aged 19)	Railway Union
11	BK	Louise Galvin	April 3, 1987 (aged 31)	UL Bohemians
12	FW	Deirbhile Nic a Bháird	September 22, 1995 (aged 22)	UL Bohemians
13	FW	Claire Boles	May 28, 1998 (aged 20)	Railway Union

== Japan ==
Head coach: Hitoshi Inada

No.	Pos.	Player	Date of birth (age)	Union / Club
1	FW	Chiharu Nakamura (c)	April 25, 1988 (aged 30)	Arukas Queen Kumagaya
2	BK	Noriko Taniguchi	September 7, 1992 (aged 25)	Arukas Queen Kumagaya
3	FW	Bativakalolo Raichelmiyo	September 18, 1997 (aged 20)	Arukas Queen Kumagaya
4	FW	Yume Okuroda	July 6, 1994 (aged 24)	Arukas Queen Kumagaya
5	BK	Fumiko Otake	February 2, 1999 (aged 19)	Nippon Sport Science University
6	BK	Sayaka Suzuki	May 19, 1997 (aged 21)	RKU Rugby Ryugasaki Grace
7	FW	Tomomi Kozasa	November 21, 1991 (aged 26)	Hokkaido Barbarias Diana
8	FW	Iroha Nagata	December 21, 1998 (aged 19)	Arukas Queen Kumagaya
9	BK	Honoka Tsutsumi	June 19, 1997 (aged 21)	Nippon Sport Science University
10	BK	Yume Hirano	March 15, 2000 (aged 18)	Nippon Sport Science University
11	BK	Yukari Tateyama	October 1, 1997 (aged 20)	Nippon Sport Science University
12	BK	Emii Tanaka	October 19, 1999 (aged 18)	Nippon Sport Science University
13	BK	Ano Kuwai	October 20, 1989 (aged 28)	Arukas Queen Kumagaya

== Mexico ==
Head coach: Robin MacDowell

No.	Pos.	Player	Date of birth (age)	Union / Club
1		Michelle Farah	August 28, 1990 (aged 27)	Guadalajara
2		Isabela González	March 22, 1990 (aged 28)	CDMX
3		Carolina Sandoval	February 2, 1995 (aged 23)	Saltillo
4		Daniela Rosales (c)	April 3, 1989 (aged 29)	CDMX
5		Brenda Weinel	January 25, 1984 (aged 34)	Frankfurt
6		Margely Angulo	July 18, 1997 (aged 21)	Quintana Roo
7		Fernanda Carillo	April 2, 1992 (aged 26)	Guadalajara
8		Adriana Mendoza	December 6, 1998 (aged 19)	Oregon
9		Yazmin Rámirez	October 4, 1992 (aged 25)	Guanajuato
10		Ariana Lewis	November 24, 1996 (aged 21)	Sacramento Amazons
11		Karina Landeros	March 24, 1988 (aged 30)	Legion de Cuervos
12		Karmin Macedo	March 31, 1995 (aged 23)	California

== New Zealand ==
Head coach: Allan Bunting

No.	Pos.	Player	Date of birth (age)	Union / Club
1	BK	Ruby Tui	December 13, 1991 (aged 26)	Bay of Plenty
2	FW	Shakira Baker	January 4, 1992 (aged 26)	Waikato
3	FW	Stacey Waaka	November 3, 1995 (aged 22)	Waikato
4	BK	Niall Williams	April 21, 1988 (aged 30)	Auckland
5	FW	Sarah Goss (c)	December 9, 1992 (aged 25)	Manawatu
6	BK	Michaela Blyde	December 21, 1995 (aged 22)	Bay of Plenty
7	BK	Tyla Nathan-Wong	July 1, 1994 (aged 24)	Auckland
8	BK	Kelly Brazier	October 28, 1989 (aged 28)	Bay of Plenty
9	BK	Gayle Broughton	June 5, 1996 (aged 22)	Bay of Plenty
10	FW	Theresa Fitzpatrick	February 25, 1995 (aged 23)	Auckland
11	FW	Portia Woodman	July 12, 1991 (aged 27)	Counties Manukau
12	BK	Tenika Willison	December 7, 1997 (aged 20)	Waikato

== Papua New Guinea ==
Head coach: John Larry

No.	Pos.	Player	Date of birth (age)	Union / Club
1	FW	Debbie Kaore	September 11, 1989 (aged 28)	New Capital District
2	FW	Melanie Kawa	January 11, 1986 (aged 32)	Queensland
3	FW	Lynette Kwarula	July 4, 1990 (aged 28)	Central
4	BK	Taiva Lavai	September 16, 1983 (aged 34)	New Capital District
5		Cassandra Sampson (c)	November 15, 1989 (aged 28)	Central
6	BK	Gemma Schnaubelt	August 20, 1997 (aged 20)	Queensland
7	BK	Fatima Rama	January 28, 1981 (aged 37)	Central
8		Chelsea Garesa	July 30, 1999 (aged 18)	New Capital District
9	BK	Marie Biyama	March 1, 1998 (aged 20)	Central
10		Helen Abau	May 16, 1991 (aged 27)	Central
11		Marlugu Dixon	August 17, 1986 (aged 31)	Queensland
12		Yolanda Gittins	October 20, 1992 (aged 25)	Queensland

== Russia ==
Head coach: Andrey Kuzin

No.	Pos.	Player	Date of birth (age)	Union / Club
1	BK	Daria Noritsina	July 20, 1996 (aged 22)	RGUTIS–Podmoskovie
2	BK	Anastasia Prokudina	December 17, 1995 (aged 22)	GBU KK "RCSP po IVS"
3	BK	Daria Shestakova	February 5, 1996 (aged 22)	RGUTIS–Podmoskovie
4	BK	Alena Mikhaltsova	December 8, 1993 (aged 24)	Yenisey-STM
5	FW	Baizat Khamidova	August 31, 1990 (aged 27)	Krasny Yar
6	FW	Anna Gavrilyuk	March 2, 1991 (aged 27)	RGUTIS–Podmoskovie
7	FW	Arina Bystrova	February 6, 1996 (aged 22)	RGUTIS–Podmoskovie
8	BK	Marina Kukina	August 22, 1993 (aged 24)	RGUTIS–Podmoskovie
9	FW	Anna Baranchuk	December 18, 1993 (aged 24)	GBU KK "RCSP po IVS"
10	BK	Daria Lushina	November 1, 1996 (aged 21)	GBU KK "RCSP po IVS"
11	FW	Kristina Seredina	December 24, 1994 (aged 23)	RGUTIS–Podmoskovie
12	BK	Maria Perestiak	August 27, 1991 (aged 26)	Yenisey-STM

== South Africa ==
Head Coach: Paul Delport

No.	Pos.	Player	Date of birth (age)	Union / Club
1	FW	Zinhle Ndawonde	May 22, 1989 (aged 29)	Unattached
2		Christelene Steinhobel	September 20, 1990 (aged 27)	Unattached
3		Buhle Sonomzi	February 18, 1997 (aged 21)	Unattached
4	BK	Zintle Mpupha (c)	December 25, 1993 (aged 24)	Unattached
5	BK	Zenay Jordaan	April 4, 1991 (aged 27)	Unattached
6		Snenhlanhla Shozi	May 5, 1997 (aged 21)	Unattached
7	BK	Eloise Webb	March 5, 1996 (aged 22)	Unattached
8		Kimico Manuel	August 4, 1996 (aged 21)	Unattached
9	BK	Nadine Roos	March 26, 1994 (aged 24)	Unattached
10	BK	Mathrin Simmers	March 3, 1988 (aged 30)	Unattached
11		Babalwa Latsha	March 31, 1994 (aged 24)	Unattached
12	FW	Marity Pienaar	August 26, 1991 (aged 26)	Unattached

== Spain ==
Head coach: Pedro de Matías

No.	Pos.	Player	Date of birth (age)	Union / Club
1	BK	María Losada	February 29, 1996 (aged 22)	L'Hospitalet
2	FW	Uribarri Barrutieta	March 13, 1997 (aged 21)	Getxo
3	FW	Amaia Erbina	March 13, 1997 (aged 21)	Cisneros
4	BK	Patricia García	February 12, 1989 (aged 29)	Olímpico
5	FW	Marina Bravo	February 7, 1989 (aged 29)	Cisneros
6	FW	Elisabet Martínez	June 16, 1988 (aged 30)	GEiEG
7	BK	Bárbara Plà (c)	July 17, 1983 (aged 35)	Getxo
8	BK	Olivia Fresneda	April 1, 1999 (aged 19)	Industriales
9	BK	María Casado	December 25, 1985 (aged 32)	L'Hospitalet
10	BK	Teresa Bueso	July 29, 1997 (aged 20)	Lindenwood
11	BK	Iera Echebarría	October 20, 1992 (aged 25)	Olímpico
12	FW	María Ribera	July 8, 1986 (aged 32)	L'Hospitalet

== United States ==
Head coach: Richie Walker

Alev Kelter was initially selected as part of the squad, but was still recovering from injuries and so was substituted with Kelsi Stockert.

No.	Pos.	Player	Date of birth (age)	Union / Club
1	FW	Cheta Emba	July 16, 1993 (aged 25)	Unattached
2	BK	Ryan Carlyle	November 24, 1989 (aged 28)	Unattached
3	FW	Abby Gustaitis	May 9, 1991 (aged 27)	Unattached
4	BK	Nicole Heavirland (c)	February 25, 1995 (aged 23)	Unattached
5	BK	Kelsi Stockert	April 1, 1993 (aged 25)	Unattached
6	BK	Lauren Doyle	February 23, 1991 (aged 27)	Unattached
7	BK	Naya Tapper	August 3, 1994 (aged 23)	Unattached
8	BK	Ilona Maher	August 12, 1996 (aged 21)	Unattached
9	FW	Joanne Fa'avesi	February 5, 1992 (aged 26)	Unattached
10	FW	Kate Zackary	July 26, 1989 (aged 28)	Unattached
11	BK	Kristen Thomas	July 1, 1993 (aged 25)	Unattached
12	FW	Jordan Gray	July 2, 1993 (aged 25)	Unattached
