= List of Olympic medalists in rugby sevens =

This is the complete list of Olympic medalists in rugby sevens.

== Seven-a-side ==
=== Men's ===
Games	Gold	Silver	Bronze
2016 Rio de Janeiro	Fiji: Masivesi Dakuwaqa; Apisai Domolailai; Osea Kolinisau; Semi Kunatani; Viliame Mata; Leone Nakarawa; Vatemo Ravouvou; Kitione Taliga; Josua Tuisova; Jerry Tuwai; Jasa Veremalua; Samisoni Viriviri; Savenaca Rawaca	Great Britain: Mark Bennett; Dan Bibby; Phil Burgess; Sam Cross; James Davies; Ollie Lindsay-Hague; Ruaridh McConnochie; Tom Mitchell; Dan Norton; Mark Robertson; James Rodwell; Marcus Watson	South Africa: Cecil Afrika; Tim Agaba; Kyle Brown; Juan de Jongh; Justin Geduld; Francois Hougaard; Werner Kok; Cheslin Kolbe; Dylan Sage; Kwagga Smith; Philip Snyman; Roscko Speckman; Seabelo Senatla
2020 Tokyo	Fiji: Napolioni Bolaca; Vilimoni Botitu; Meli Derenalagi; Sireli Maqala; Iosefo Masi; Waisea Nacuqu; Kalione Nasoko; Semi Radradra; Aminiasi Tuimaba; Asaeli Tuivuaka; Jerry Tuwai; Josua Vakurunabili; Jiuta Wainiqolo	New Zealand: Kurt Baker; Dylan Collier; Scott Curry; Andrew Knewstubb; Ngarohi McGarvey-Black; Tim Mikkelson; Sione Molia; Etene Nanai-Seturo; Tone Ng Shiu; Amanaki Nicole; William Warbrick; Regan Ware; Joe Webber	Argentina: Santiago Álvarez; Lautaro Bazán; Lucio Cinti; Felipe del Mestre; Rodrigo Etchart; Luciano González; Rodrigo Isgro; Santiago Mare; Ignacio Mendy; Marcos Moneta; Matías Osadczuk; Gastón Revol; Germán Schulz
2024 Paris	France; Varian Pasquet; Andy Timo; Rayan Rebbadj; Théo Forner; Stephen Parez; Paulin Riva; Jefferson-Lee Joseph; Antoine Zeghdar; Aaron Grandidier Nkanang; Jean-Pascal Barraque; Antoine Dupont; Jordan Sepho; Nelson Epee	Fiji; Joji Nasova; Joseva Talacolo; Jeremia Matana; Sevuloni Mocenacagi; Iosefo Masi; Ponepati Loganimasi; Terio Veilawa; Waisea Nacuqu; Jerry Tuwai; Iowane Teba; Kaminieli Rasaku; Selestino Ravutaumada; Josaia Raisuqe; Filipe Sauturaga	South Africa; Christie Grobbelaar; Ryan Oosthuizen; Impi Visser; Zain Davids; Quewin Nortje; Tiaan Pretorius; Tristan Leyds; Selvyn Davids; Shaun Williams; Rosko Specman; Siviwe Soyizwapi; Shilton van Wyk; Ronald Brown
2028 Los Angeles			

=== Women's ===
Games	Gold	Silver	Bronze
2016 Rio de Janeiro	Australia: Nicole Beck; Charlotte Caslick; Emilee Cherry; Chloe Dalton; Gemma Etheridge; Ellia Green; Shannon Parry; Evania Pelite; Alicia Quirk; Emma Tonegato; Amy Turner; Sharni Williams	New Zealand: Shakira Baker; Kelly Brazier; Gayle Broughton; Theresa Fitzpatrick; Sarah Goss; Huriana Manuel; Kayla McAlister; Tyla Nathan-Wong; Terina Te Tamaki; Ruby Tui; Niall Williams; Portia Woodman	Canada: Brittany Benn; Hannah Darling; Bianca Farella; Jen Kish; Ghislaine Landry; Megan Lukan; Kayla Moleschi; Karen Paquin; Kelly Russell; Ashley Steacy; Natasha Watcham-Roy; Charity Williams
2020 Tokyo	New Zealand: Michaela Blyde; Kelly Brazier; Gayle Broughton; Theresa Fitzpatrick; Stacey Fluhler; Sarah Hirini; Shiray Kaka; Tyla Nathan-Wong; Risi Pouri-Lane; Alena Saili; Ruby Tui; Portia Woodman	France: Coralie Bertrand; Anne-Cécile Ciofani; Caroline Drouin; Camille Grassineau; Lina Guérin; Fanny Horta; Shannon Izar; Chloé Jacquet; Carla Neisen; Séraphine Okemba; Chloé Pelle; Jade Ulutule	Fiji: Lavena Cavuru; Raijieli Daveua; Sesenieli Donu; Laisana Likuceva; Rusila Nagasau; Ana Naimasi; Alowesi Nakoci; Roela Radiniyavuni; Viniana Riwai; Tokasa Seniyasi; Vasiti Solikoviti; Reapi Ulunisau
2024 Paris	New Zealand: Michaela Blyde; Jazmin Felix-Hotham; Sarah Hirini; Tyla King; Jorja Miller; Manaia Nuku; Mahina Paul; Risaleeana Pouri-Lane; Alena Saili; Theresa Setefano; Stacey Waaka; Portia Woodman-Wickliffe	Canada: Caroline Crossley; Olivia Apps; Alysha Corrigan; Asia Hogan-Rochester; Chloe Daniels; Charity Williams; Florence Symonds; Carissa Norsten; Krissy Scurfield; Fancy Bermudez; Piper Logan; Keyara Wardley; Taylor Perry; Shalaya Valenzuela	United States: Alev Kelter; Lauren Doyle; Kayla Canett; Kristi Kirshe; Ilona Maher; Ariana Ramsey; Naya Tapper; Alena Olsen; Alex Sedrick; Sammy Sullivan; Sarah Levy; Stephanie Rovetti
2028 Los Angeles			

== See also ==
- List of Olympic medalists in rugby
- Rugby union at the Summer Olympics
- Rugby sevens at the Summer Olympics
