= Rugby sevens at the 2019 Pan American Games =

- Rugby sevens pictogram
- Venue: Rugby sevens stadium
- Dates: July 26 –28, 2019
- Competitors: 192 from 12 nations

Rugby sevens at the 2019 Pan American Games in Lima, Peru was held from July 26th to 28th. The venue for the competition is the rugby sevens stadium located at the Villa María del Triunfo cluster.

A total of eight men's and eight women's teams (each consisting up to 12 athletes) competed in each tournament. This means a total of 192 athletes were scheduled to compete. After making its debut at the 2015 edition, the women's tournament has been expanded to eight teams from six.

== Medal table ==
Rank	Nation	Gold	Silver	Bronze	Total
1	Canada	1	1	0	2
2	Argentina	1	0	0	1
3	United States	0	1	1	2
4	Colombia	0	0	1	1
Totals (4 entries)		2	2	2	6

== Medalists ==
Event	Gold	Silver	Bronze
Men's tournament	Argentina: 1. Fernando Luna; 2. Felipe Del Mestre; 3. Germán Schulz; 4. Francisco Ulloa; 5. Tomás Vanni; 6. Santiago Álvarez; 7. Lautaro Bazán; 8. Gastón Revol; 9. Matías Osadczuk; 10. Santiago Mare; 11. Luciano González; 12. Franco Sábato	Canada: 1. Sean Duke; 2. Admir Cejvanovic; 3. Brennig Prevost; 4. Phil Berna; 5. Luke McCloskey; 6. Cooper Coats; 7. Josiah Morra; 8. Josh Thiel; 9. Nathan Hirayama; 10. Pat Kay; 11. Harry Jones; 12. Adam Zaruba	United States: 1. Ben Broselle; 2. Harley Wheeler; 3. Joe Schroeder; 4. Jake Lachina; 5. Marcus Tupuola; 6. Travion Clark; 7. Cody Melphy; 8. Maceo Brown; 9. Naima Fuala'au; 10. Anthony Welmers; 11. Lorenzo Thomas; 12. D'Montae Noble
Women's tournament	Canada: 1. Delaney Aikens; 2. Kayla Moleschi; 3. Caroline Crossley; 4. Breanne Nicholas; 5. Tausani Levale; 6. Olivia De Couvreur; 7. Sara Kaljuvee; 8. Pam Buisa; 9. Asia Hogan-Rochester; 10. Kaili Lukan; 11. Emma Chown; 12. Temitope Ogunjimi	United States: 1. Cheta Emba; 2. Ilona Maher; 3. Abby Gustaitis; 4. Alena Olsen; 5. Stephanie Rovetti; 6. Lauren Thunen; 7. Naya Tapper; 8. Jordan Matyas; 9. Emily Henrich; 10. Kayla Canett; 11. Ariana Ramsey; 12. Kristi Kirshe	Colombia: 1. Nicole Acevedo; 2. Isabel Romero; 3. Carmen Ibarra; 4. Daniela Alzate; 5. Lina Pedroza; 6. Catalina Arango; 7. María Arzuaga; 8. Leidy Soto; 9. Camila Lopera; 10. Laura Mejía; 11. Sharon Acevado; 12. Valentina Tapias

== Participating nations ==
12 countries qualified rugby sevens teams . The numbers of participants qualified are in parentheses. Jamaica, Peru and Trinidad and Tobago are all scheduled to make their Pan American Games debut in the sport.

- Argentina (24)
- Brazil (24)
- Canada (24)
- Chile (12)
- Colombia (12)
- Guyana (12)
- Jamaica (12)
- Mexico (12)
- Peru (12)
- Trinidad and Tobago (12)
- United States (24)
- Uruguay (12)

== Qualification ==
Eight men's teams and eight women's teams qualified to compete at the games in each tournament. The host nation (Peru) received automatic qualification in the women's tournament only, along with seven other teams. Eight men's teams qualified through various tournaments as well.

=== Men ===
Event	Dates	Location	Vacancies	Qualified
Automatic qualification	—N/a	—N/a	3	Argentina; Canada; United States
2018 South American Games	27–29 May	(Bolivia) Colcapirhua	2	Chile; Uruguay
2018 RAN Sevens	22–23 September	(Barbados) Saint James	2	Guyana; Jamaica
2019 Sudamérica Rugby Men's Sevens OQT	29–30 June	(Chile) Santiago	1	Brazil
Total			8	

=== Women ===
Event	Dates	Location	Vacancies	Qualified
Host Nation	—N/a	—N/a	1	Peru
Automatic qualification	—N/a	—N/a	2	Canada; United States
2018 South American Games	27–29 May	(Bolivia) Colcapirhua	1	Brazil
2018 RAN Women's Sevens	22–23 September	(Barbados) Saint James	2	Mexico; Trinidad and Tobago
2018 Valentín Martínez Tournament	9–10 November	(Uruguay) Montevideo	1	Argentina
2019 Sudamérica Rugby Women's Sevens OQT	1–2 June	(Peru) Lima	1	Colombia
Total			8	

== See also ==
- Rugby sevens at the 2020 Summer Olympics
