= Rugby sevens at the 2019 Pan American Games – Women's tournament =

Women's rugby sevens at the XVIII Pan American Games
- Host nation: Peru

Tournament details
- Matches played: 20

The rugby sevens women's tournament at the 2019 Pan American Games in Lima, Peru was held on 26–28 July 2019, with eight teams participating at the sports center in Villa María del Triunfo.

== Qualification ==
Eight women's teams qualified to compete in the tournament games. The host nation (Peru) and two core World Sevens Series core teams (Canada and United States) qualified automatically, along with five other teams in various qualifying tournaments.

=== Summary ===
Event	Dates	Location	Vacancies	Qualified
Host Nation	—N/a	—N/a	1	Peru
Automatic qualification	—N/a	—N/a	2	Canada; United States
2018 South American Games	27–29 May	(Bolivia) Colcapirhua	1	Brazil
2018 RAN Women's Sevens	22–23 September	(Barbados) Saint James	2	Mexico; Trinidad and Tobago
2018 Valentín Martínez Tournament	9–10 November	(Uruguay) Montevideo	1	Argentina
2019 Sudamérica Rugby Women's Sevens OQT	1–2 June	(Peru) Lima	1	Colombia
Total			8	

== Results ==
All times are in Peru Time (UTC−5).

=== Pool stage ===
==== Pool A ====
Pos	Team	Pld	W	D	L	PF	PA	PD	Pts	Qualification
1	United States	3	3	0	0	142	0	+142	9	Semifinals
2	Colombia	3	2	0	1	62	62	0	7	Semifinals
3	Argentina	3	1	0	2	55	73	−18	5	5–8th place semifinals
4	Trinidad and Tobago	3	0	0	3	10	134	−124	3	5–8th place semifinals

Source: Lima 2019
Rules for classification: 1) Points; 2) Head-to-head result; 3) Point difference; 4) Points scored; 5) draw.

26 July 2019
9:50

Colombia	24–14	Argentina
Try: Romero 1'm Arzuaga 3'c Mejia (2) 6'c, 7'm Con: Lopera (2/3) 3', 7'; Romero (0/1)	Report	Try: Montero 0'c Mattus 9'c Con: Montero (1/1) 1'; Padellaro (1/1) 9'

Villa María del Triunfo Sports Center
Referee: Emily Hsieh (United States)

26 July 2019
10:15

United States	55–0	Trinidad and Tobago
Try: Emba (2) 1'm, 6'c Canett 3'c Kirshe (2) 5'm, 7'm Rovetti 8'm Ramsey (2) 10'c, 12'c, 14'c Con: Olsen (3/5) 4', 13', 14'; Canett (1/3) 7'; Emba (1/1) 10'	Report

Villa María del Triunfo Sports Center
Referee: Nerea Livoni (Argentina)

27 July 2019
10:10

Colombia	38–10	Trinidad and Tobago
Try: Soto 1'c Mejia 2'c Arzuaga (2) 5'c, 7'c Lopera 7'm Acevado 10'; Con: Lopera (4/5) 1', 2', 5', 7'	Report	Try: Glasgow 6'm John 14'm Con: Jack (0/1); Pantor (0/1)

Villa María del Triunfo Sports Center
Referee: Nayara Santos (Brazil)

27 July 2019
10:35

United States	49–0	Argentina
Try: Tapper (3) 1'm, 6'm, 8'm Henrich 2'm Emba (2) 7'c, 11'm Olsen (2) 9'm, 14'm Rovetti 12'm Con: Emba (1/3) 7'; Olsen (1/6) 10'	Report

Villa María del Triunfo Sports Center
Referee: Shanda Mosher-Gallant (Canada)

27 July 2019
14:00

Argentina	41–0	Trinidad and Tobago
Try: Casas 1'm A. Moreno 3'c Trigo 4'm Montero 4'm Pedrozo 7'c Genghini 9'c Mattus 12'm Corzo 13'm Con: Padellaro (1/4) 3'; Aguilar (2/4) 8', 9'	Report

Villa María del Triunfo Sports Center
Referee: Nayara Santos (Brazil)

27 July 2019
14:25

United States	38–0	Colombia
Try: Maher 1'c Ramsey (3) 6'm, 9'm, 12'c Rovetti 8'c Henrich 14'c Con: Emba (2/3) 1', 14'; Olsen (2/3) 8', 12'	Report

Villa María del Triunfo Sports Center
Referee: Nerea Livoni (Argentina)

==== Pool B ====
Pos	Team	Pld	W	D	L	PF	PA	PD	Pts	Qualification
1	Canada	3	3	0	0	134	0	+134	9	Semifinals
2	Brazil	3	2	0	1	78	31	+47	7	Semifinals
3	Peru	3	1	0	2	48	94	−46	5	5–8th place semifinals
4	Mexico	3	0	0	3	7	143	−136	3	5–8th place semifinals

Source: Lima 2019
Rules for classification: 1) Points; 2) Head-to-head result; 3) Point difference; 4) Points scored; 5) draw.

26 July 2019
10:40

Brazil	33–5	Peru
Try: Zanellato (2) 5'c, 12'c Cerullo (2) 9'c, 12'c Kochhann 14'm Con: Kochhann (2/3) 6', 9', 13'; Cerullo (1/1) 12'	Report	Try: Flores 2'm Con: Quesada (0/1)

Villa María del Triunfo Sports Center
Referee: Shanda Mosher-Gallant (Canada)

26 July 2019
11:05

Canada	54–0	Mexico
Try: Chown (2) 0'c, 4'c Crossley (2) 7'c, 7'c Levale (2) 9'c, 12'c de Couvreur 10'c Aikens 13'm Con: Nicholas (5/5) 1', 4', 7', 8', 11'; Levale (2/3) 9', 12'	Report

Villa María del Triunfo Sports Center
Referee: Natalie Barbier (Peru)

27 July 2019
11:00

Brazil	45–0	Mexico
Try: B. Silva (2) 0'm, 2'm Kochhann (2) 3'c, 4'c Costa 11'c M. Silva 13'c Cerullo 14'c Con: Kochhann (2/4) 4', 5'; Cerullo (3/3) 11', 13', 14'	Report

Villa María del Triunfo Sports Center
Referee: Emily Hsieh (United States)

27 July 2019
11:25

Canada	54–0	Peru
Try: Aikens (2) 0'c, 3'c Moleschi 5'c Chown 7'c Hogan-Rochester (3) 7'c, 11'c, 14'c Buisa 10'm Con: Levale (5/5) 0', 4', 5', 7', 8'; Nicholas (2/3) 11', 14'	Report

Villa María del Triunfo Sports Center
Referee: Nerea Livoni (Argentina)

27 July 2019
14:50

Peru	43–7	Mexico
Try: Flores (5) 0'm, 2'c, 3'c, 12'm, 14'm Quesada 7'c Pacheco 9'c Con: Quesada (3/6) 2', 4', 7'; Chuquivala (1/1) 9'	Report	Try: Elguezabal 11'c Con: Salomón (1/1) 11'

Villa María del Triunfo Sports Center
Referee: Shanda Mosher-Gallant (Canada)

27 July 2019
15:15

Canada	26–0	Brazil
Try: Levale 3'c Lukan 7'm Buisa 9'c Ogunjimi 12'c Con: Nicholas (3/3) 4', 10', 12'; Levale (0/1)	Report

Villa María del Triunfo Sports Center
Referee: Emily Hsieh (United States)

=== Classification round ===
Semi-finals
28 July — 9:10 — Lima
Peru	31
Trinidad and Tobago	10
28 July — 9:35 — Lima
Argentina	32
Mexico	7

Fifth Place
28 July — 13:25 — Lima
Peru	12
Argentina	34
Seventh Place
28 July — 13:00 — Lima
Trinidad and Tobago	0
Mexico	22

==== 5–8th place semifinals ====
28 July 2019
9:10

Peru	31–10	Trinidad and Tobago
Try: Ratto 1'c Flores (2) 4'm, 7'm Quesada 9'c Masias 12'c Con: Quesada (3/5) 1', 9', 12'	Report	Try: Kintiba (2) 5'm, 10'm Con: Jack (0/2)

Villa María del Triunfo Sports Center
Referee: Nerea Livoni (Argentina)

28 July 2019
9:35

Argentina	32–7	Mexico
Try: Pedrozo (2) 0'm, 6'm Montero 3'c Aguilar (2) 4'm, 8'm Moreno 9'm Con: Otero (1/4) 4'; Aguilar (0/2)	Report	Try: Penalty try 12'

Villa María del Triunfo Sports Center
Referee: Nayara Santos (Brazil)

==== Seventh place match ====
28 July 2019
13:00

Trinidad and Tobago	0–22	Mexico
	Report	Try: Tovar 1'c Cabrera 4'm Salomón 8'm Gonzalez-Berazueta 13'm Con: Gonzalez-Berazueta (1/4) 2'

Villa María del Triunfo Sports Center
Referee: Nerea Livoni (Argentina)

==== Fifth place match ====
28 July 2019
13:25

Peru	12–34	Argentina
Try: Flores 3'c Quesada 11'm Con: Quesada (1/2) 4'	Report	Try: Montero (3) 2'c, 5'c, 14'm Aguilar 8'm Pedrozo 10'm Mattus 12'm Con: Padellaro (2/4) 2', 5'; Aguilar (0/2)

Villa María del Triunfo Sports Center
Referee: Shanda Mosher-Gallant (Canada)

=== Medal round ===
Semi-finals
28 July — 10:50 — Lima
Canada	41
Colombia	0
28 July — 11:15 — Lima
United States	33
Brazil	19

Final
28 July — 15:30 — Lima
Canada	24
United States	10
Third Place
28 July — 14:40 — Lima
Colombia	29 (a.e.t.)
Brazil	24

==== Semifinals ====
28 July 2019
10:50

Canada	41–0	Colombia
Try: de Couvreur (3) 1'c, 2'm, 8'm Kaljuvee (3) 5'c, 6'c, 12'm Hogan-Rochester 11'm Con: Levale (3/5) 1', 6', 7'; Nicholas (0/2)	Report

Villa María del Triunfo Sports Center
Referee: Emily Hsieh (United States)

28 July 2019
11:15

United States	33–19	Brazil
Try: Ramsey (2) 0'c, 7'c Matyas 3'm Henrich 8'c Gustaitis 12'c Con: Olsen (3/4) 1', 8', 9'; Canett (1/1) 13'	Report	Try: Costa 7'c B. Silva (2) 11', 14'; Con: Kochhann (1/2) 7'; Cerullo (1/1) 14'

Villa María del Triunfo Sports Center
Referee: Shanda Mosher-Gallant (Canada)

==== Bronze medal match ====
28 July 2019
14:40

Colombia	29–24 (a.e.t.)	Brazil
Try: Ibarra 3'c S. Acevado 5'm Lopera (2) 11'm, 16'; N. Acevado 14'c Con: Lopera (2/4) 4', 14'	Report	Try: Cerullo 0'c da Silva 2'm B. Silva 7'c de Souza 8'm Con: Kochhann (2/4) 1', 7'

Villa María del Triunfo Sports Center
Referee: Emily Hsieh (United States)

==== Gold medal match ====
28 July 2019
15:30

(gold) Canada	24–10	United States (silver)
Try: Hogan-Rochester (3) 1'c, 6'm, 8'c Nicholas 11'm Con: Nicholas (2/3) 1', 9'; Levale (0/1)	Report	Try: Canett 2'm Maher 12'm Con: Olsen (0/2)

Villa María del Triunfo Sports Center
Referee: Nehuen Jauri Rivero (Argentina)

== Final ranking ==
Rank	Team
1st place, gold medalist(s)	Canada
2nd place, silver medalist(s)	United States
3rd place, bronze medalist(s)	Colombia
4	Brazil
5	Argentina
6	Peru
7	Mexico
8	Trinidad and Tobago
