= Kayla Canett =

American rugby union player (born 1998)

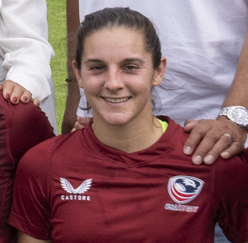
- Canett at the 2024 Summer Olympics

Personal information
- Born: April 29, 1998 (age 28)
- Education: Fallbrook High School; Pennsylvania State University
- Height: 5 ft 5 in (165 cm)
- Weight: 150 lb (68 kg)

Rugby union career
- Position: Fly half
International career
Years	Team	Apps	(Points)
2017	United States	7	
National sevens team
Years	Team		Comps
2016	United States		
Medal record
Women's rugby sevens
Representing United States
Olympic Games
Bronze medal – third place	2024 Paris	Team competition
Pan American Games
Silver medal – second place	2019 Lima	Team competition

Kayla Canett (/kəˈnɛt/ kə-NET; born April 29, 1998) is an American rugby union player. She made her debut for both the United States fifteens and sevens team in 2017. She was named in the Eagles 2017 Women's Rugby World Cup squad. In 2023, Canett suited up with the Pittsburgh Steeltoes of Premier Rugby Sevens.

== Early life and career ==
Canett attended Fallbrook High School and Pennsylvania State University.

She began her rugby career in her freshman year of high school in 2013. She previously played basketball and soccer. She is majoring in Kinesiology at Penn State.

She is a cousin to USA Rugby 7s teammate Sammy Sullivan.

== Rugby career ==
=== College career ===
Canett played collegiate rugby at Penn State University as scrumhalf and flyhalf. In 2017, Canett aided her team in winning its twelfth Division I National Championship after defeating Lindenwood University, 28-25. Not only was this the Nittany Lions' twelfth championship overall, but it was their sixth-straight.

=== National Sevens Career ===
Canett made her sevens debut at the 2016 Dubai Women's Sevens. She competed at the 2019 Pan American Games.

Canett was selected for the U.S. Eagles sevens squad and made her Olympic debut at the 2020 Summer Olympics in Tokyo, Japan. After getting knocked out 21-12 to Great Britain in the Quarter-finals, Canett and the Eagles ended the games in sixth place.

In 2022, She was again selected in the United States team for the Rugby World Cup Sevens in Cape Town.

Canett was a named in the USA women's sevens team for the 2024 Summer Olympics in Paris. Her side defeated Australia in the bronze medal final and earned USA's first ever Olympic medal in sevens.

=== National XVs career ===
Canett made her fifteen's debut against Canada in 2017.

=== Premier Rugby Sevens ===
==== 2023 ====
During the 2023 Premier Rugby Sevens season, Canett suited up with the Pittsburgh Steeltoes. This marked the Steeltoes' inaugural season as PR7s expanded to eight franchises prior to the start of the 2023 season. Canett and the Steeltoes ended the year tied for eighth place as they produced a 1-3 record throughout the season. Their lone win was a 22-0 blowout against the Texas Team on June 17, 2023.

== Statistics ==
Team	Season	GP	Tries	Points	Conversion Kicks	Tackles	Carries
Pittsburgh Steeltoes	2023	4	1	9	2	3	3

== See also ==
- List of Pennsylvania State University Olympians
- Kayla Canett Olympic Biography
