= Isabel Romero =

- Full name: Isabel Cristina Romero Benitez
- Born: July 27, 1996 (age 30)
- Height: 1.61 m (5 ft 3 in)
- Weight: 62 kg (137 lb)

Rugby union career
National sevens team
Years	Team	Comps
- Colombia
Medal record
Representing Colombia
Women's rugby sevens
Pan American Games
Bronze medal – third place	2019 Lima	Team competition
Central American and Caribbean Games
Gold medal – first place	2014 Veracruz	Team competition
Gold medal – first place	2018 Barranquilla	Team competition

Isabel Cristina Romero Benitez (born 27 July 1996) is a female rugby sevens player for Colombia. She represented Colombia at the 2015 Pan Am Games in Toronto, Ontario, Canada. She was named in Colombia's women's national rugby sevens team to the 2016 Rio Olympics.
