= Sara Kaljuvee =

Canadian rugby union and sevens player

- Born: February 7, 1993 (age 33) Toronto, Ontario
- Height: 165 cm (5 ft 5 in)
- Weight: 74 kg (163 lb)
- University: St. Francis Xavier University

Rugby union career
- Position: Centre
International career
Years	Team	Apps	(Points)
	Canada	21	
- Correct as of 2024-12-20
National sevens team
Years	Team		Comps
2013–Present	Canada		
Medal record
Women's rugby sevens
Representing Canada
Olympic Games
Bronze medal – third place	2016 Rio	Team competition
Pan American Games
Gold medal – first place	2015 Toronto	Team competition
Gold medal – first place	2019 Lima	Team competition

Sara Lynn Kaljuvee (born February 7, 1993) is a Canadian rugby sevens and fifteens player. She won a bronze medal at the 2016 Summer Olympics, and competed for Canada at the delayed 2021 Rugby World Cup.

== Rugby career ==
=== 2015–19 ===
In 2016, Kaljuvee was named to Canada's first ever women's rugby sevens Olympic Team. She is a two time gold medalist at the 2015 Pan American Games and the 2019 Pan American Games in Lima, Peru as a member of the Canada women's national rugby sevens team.

Kaljuvee was a part of the first ever women's Commonwealth Games tournament in 2018. She was also a member of the 2018 Sevens World Cup Team.

=== 2022–23 ===
In 2022, Kaljuvee was selected and competed as the starting center in Canada's fifteens squad for the Rugby World Cup in New Zealand. She scored a try against Fiji in a warm-up match before the World Cup.

Kaljuvee was named in Canada's traveling squad for the 2023 Pacific Four Series. She started in her sides Pacific Four loss to the Black Ferns, they went down 21–52.

In 2023, Kaljuvee featured in the Premier Rugby Sevens tournament and captained the Pittsburgh Steeltoes.
