= Tausani Levale =

Canadian rugby sevens player

- Born: October 2, 1999 (age 27) Tofino, British Columbia
- Height: 1.67 m (5 ft 6 in)
- Weight: 78 kg (172 lb)

Rugby union career
- Position: Fly-half
National sevens team
| Years | Team | Comps |
| 2017-present | Canada | |
Medal record
Women's rugby sevens
Representing Canada
Pan American Games
| Gold medal – first place | 2019 Lima | Team competition |

Tausani Levale is a Canadian rugby sevens player. She won a gold medal at the 2019 Pan American Games as a member of the Canada women's national rugby sevens team. Levale credits her interest in the sport of rugby union in part to her Samoan heritage and the complexity of the sport. Levale plays in both rugby sevens and the 15s. She made her debut with the Canadian national team at the age of 17 in 2017 and was the youngest woman to do so since Caroline Crossley in 2015.
