= 2018 RAN Sevens =

- Hosts: Saint James
- Date: 22–23 September

The 2018 RAN Sevens was the 19th edition of the annual rugby sevens tournament organized by Rugby Americas North. It will be played at the Barbados Polo Club in Saint James, Barbados, with the winner eligible for the 2019 Hong Kong Sevens qualifier tournament and two teams advancing to the 2019 Pan American Games.

== Teams ==
The following fourteen teams will participate:

- Barbados
- Bermuda
- British Virgin Islands
- Cayman Islands
- Curaçao
- Dominican Republic
- Guadeloupe
- Guyana
- Jamaica
- Mexico
- Saint Lucia
- Saint Vincent and the Grenadines
- Trinidad and Tobago
- Turks and Caicos Islands

== Pool stage ==
All times in Atlantic Standard Time (UTC−04:00) Top 2 in each group advance to the knockout stage.

=== Pool A ===
Teams	Pld	W	D	L	PF	PA	+/−	Pts
Jamaica	2	2	0	0	64	5	+59	6
Dominican Republic	2	1	0	1	38	26	+12	4
British Virgin Islands	2	0	0	2	0	71	−71	2

22 September 2018
10:58

Jamaica	38−0	British Virgin Islands

22 September 2018
13:00

Jamaica	26−5	Dominican Republic

22 September 2018
15:00

Dominican Republic	33−0	British Virgin Islands

=== Pool B ===
Teams	Pld	W	D	L	PF	PA	+/−	Pts
Guyana	2	2	0	0	78	10	+68	6
Barbados	2	1	0	1	60	19	+41	4
Curaçao	2	0	0	2	0	109	−109	2

22 September 2018
10:58

Guyana	59−0	Curaçao

22 September 2018
13:00

Guyana	19−10	Barbados

22 September 2018
15:00

Barbados	50−0	Curaçao

=== Pool C ===
Teams	Pld	W	D	L	PF	PA	+/−	Pts
Mexico	3	3	0	0	82	14	+68	9
Bermuda	3	2	0	1	71	24	+47	7
Guadeloupe	3	1	0	2	24	51	−27	5
Turks and Caicos Islands	3	0	0	3	10	98	−88	3

22 September 2018
10:14

Mexico	24−0	Guadeloupe

22 September 2018
10:14

Bermuda	40−0	Turks and Caicos Islands

22 September 2018
12:04

Mexico	41−0	Turks and Caicos Islands

22 September 2018
12:04

Bermuda	17−7	Guadeloupe

22 September 2018
14:06

Mexico	17−14	Bermuda

22 September 2018
14:06

Turks and Caicos Islands	10−17	Guadeloupe

=== Pool D ===
Teams	Pld	W	D	L	PF	PA	+/−	Pts
Trinidad and Tobago	3	3	0	0	82	10	+72	9
Cayman Islands	3	2	0	1	64	40	+24	7
Saint Vincent and the Grenadines	3	1	0	2	17	39	−22	5
Saint Lucia	3	0	0	3	0	74	−74	3

22 September 2018
10:36

Trinidad and Tobago	20−0	Saint Lucia

22 September 2018
10:36

Cayman Islands	17−0	Saint Vincent and the Grenadines

22 September 2018
12:26

Trinidad and Tobago	22−10	Saint Vincent and the Grenadines

22 September 2018
12:26

Cayman Islands	47−0	Saint Lucia

22 September 2018
14:28

Trinidad and Tobago	40−0	Cayman Islands

22 September 2018
14:28

Saint Vincent and the Grenadines	7−0	Saint Lucia

== Knockout stage ==
=== Trophy ===
Pool 1

Teams	Pld	W	D	L	PF	PA	+/−	Pts
British Virgin Islands	2	1	0	1	47	34	+13	4
Saint Lucia	2	1	0	1	41	47	−6	4
Turks and Caicos Islands	2	1	0	1	45	52	−7	4

23 September 2018
9:00

British Virgin Islands	21−24	Turks and Caicos Islands

23 September 2018
10:50

Saint Lucia	31−21	Turks and Caicos Islands

23 September 2018
12:30

British Virgin Islands	26−10	Saint Lucia

Pool 2

Teams	Pld	W	D	L	PF	PA	+/−	Pts
Guadeloupe	2	2	0	0	62	0	+62	6
Saint Vincent and the Grenadines	2	1	0	1	20	29	−9	4
Curaçao	2	0	0	2	0	53	−53	2

23 September 2018
9:00

Curaçao	0−20	Saint Vincent and the Grenadines

23 September 2018
10:50

Guadeloupe	29−0	Saint Vincent and the Grenadines

23 September 2018
12:52

Curaçao	0−33	Guadeloupe

Placement

23 September 2018
14:42

Turks and Caicos Islands	29−0	Curaçao

23 September 2018
14:42

Saint Lucia	21−12	Saint Vincent and the Grenadines

23 September 2018
15:04

British Virgin Islands	7−26	Guadeloupe

=== Plate ===
Semi-finals
23 September - 11:34
Barbados	10
Trinidad and Tobago	15
23 September - 11:56
Cayman Islands	14
Dominican Republic	12

Final
23 September - 14:20
Trinidad and Tobago	31
Cayman Islands	0
Third place
23 September - 14:20
Barbados	21
Dominican Republic	12

=== Cup ===
Quarter-finals
23 September - 10:06
Jamaica	29
Barbados	0
23 September - 10:06
Trinidad and Tobago	19
Bermuda	26
23 September - 10:28
Mexico	20
Cayman Islands	5
23 September - 10:28
Guyana	12
Dominican Republic	5

Semi-finals
23 September - 13:10
Jamaica	14
Bermuda	5
23 September - 13:10
Mexico	12
Guyana	17

Final
23 September - 17:04
Jamaica	22
Guyana	17
Third place
23 September - 15:58
Bermuda	24
Mexico	7

== Standings ==
Key to colours in group tables
Green fill	Qualified to 2019 Hong Kong Sevens
Blue bar	Qualified to 2019 Pan American Games

Rank	Team
1st place, gold medalist(s)	Jamaica
2nd place, silver medalist(s)	Guyana
3rd place, bronze medalist(s)	Bermuda
4	Mexico
5	Trinidad and Tobago
6	Cayman Islands
7	Barbados
8	Dominican Republic
9	Guadeloupe
10	British Virgin Islands
11	Saint Lucia
12	Saint Vincent and the Grenadines
13	Turks and Caicos Islands
14	Curaçao

== See also ==
- 2018 RAN Women's Sevens
