= Ogunjimi =

Ogunjimi is a surname. Notable people with the surname include:

- Marvin Ogunjimi (born 1987), Belgian footballer
- Temitope Ogunjimi (born 1995), Canadian rugby sevens player
