= Emma Chown =

Canadian rugby sevens player

- Born: December 17, 1995 (age 30) Barrie, Ontario, Canada
- Height: 1.67 m (5 ft 6 in)
- Weight: 72 kg (159 lb)
- University: Queen's University

Rugby union career
National sevens team
Years	Team	Comps
2017-present	Canada	
Medal record
Women's rugby sevens
Representing Canada
Pan American Games
Gold medal – first place	2019 Lima	Team competition

Emma Chown (born December 17, 1995) is a Canadian rugby sevens player. She won a gold medal at the 2019 Pan American Games as a member of the Canada women's national rugby sevens team.

Chown competed for Canada at the 2022 Rugby World Cup Sevens in Cape Town. They placed sixth overall after losing to Fiji in the fifth place final.
