= Premier Rugby Sevens =

American rugby sevens competition

- Sport: Rugby sevens
- Instituted: 2020
- Inaugural season: 2021
- Number of teams: 16 (8 Men's and 8 Women's Teams)
- Country: United States (USA Rugby)
- Current Champions: Rocky Mountain Experts (United); SoCal Loggerheads (Men's); Northern Loonies (Women's)
- Most titles: Men's: SoCal Loggerheads (2); Women's: Northern Loonies (2)
- Website: prsevens.com
- Broadcast partner: United States: FOX Sports CBS Sports

Premier Rugby Sevens (PR7s) is an annual American men's and women's rugby sevens competition. The competition follows a touring model and involves 16 teams (8 men's and 8 women's teams) competing against each other across the country. The league was founded in 2021 and is officially sanctioned by USA Rugby as the highest level of rugby sevens in the United States.

The League is the first professional rugby union competition in North America to offer contracts to women.

== History ==
Premier Rugby Sevens was launched in 2021 by CEO and Founder Owen Scannell. Former USA Men's XV head coach Mike Tolkin joined the league in 2021 as general manager. In May 2021, the league announced 10 ambassadors from the USA Men's and Women's Rugby Sevens teams would join, including Perry Baker, Naya Tapper, Alev Kelter, Danny Barrett, Folau Niua, Stephen Tomasin, Kevon Williams, Abby Gustaitis, Ilona Maher and Carlin Isles. Neither Maher nor Isles would compete in 2021. In August 2021, USA Rugby announced that the league would be officially sanctioned as the highest level of rugby sevens in the United States.

=== 2021 ===
The league's Inaugural Championship took place at AutoZone Park in Memphis, Tennessee, on October 9, 2021. The League initially began with 10 teams with 6 men's and 4 women's teams. The Experts, Loggerheads, Loonies and Headliners would have a men's team and women's team competing in the two separate tournaments while the Locals and Team would play with only a men's team entered into the competition.

The women's Loonies coached by Olympian Kelly Griffin won the women's tournament, with standout play from Alev Kelter and tournament MVP and Canadian international Delaney Aikens. The men's Experts won the Inaugural Championships behind performances from Perry Baker and tournament MVP Logan Tago. Tago would go on to receive his first USA cap shortly after. The men's final was notably in that it was decided by a drop goal contest with a similar format to association football.

=== 2022 ===
The competition scaled to a three stop circuit in 2022, with tournaments held in San Jose, California, at PayPal Park, Washington, D.C., at Audi Field, and the 2022 Championship at Q2 Stadium. The League scaled back to include only the men's and women's teams, with the Team and Locals removed from competition. The parity between men's and women's teams led to the adoption of nomenclature of "franchises" with each franchise having a men's and women's team. The franchises would then compete for a United Championship which combined the results of the two competitions.

The Headliners were the first United Champions and won the Kathy Flores Women's Championship while the Loggerheads won the A. Jon Prusmack Men's Championship. Notable players appearing in 2022 included All Black Sevens star Brady Rush, USA Rugby Stars Alena Olsen, Martin Iosefo, Matai Leuta and Madison Hughes.

== Expansion ==
=== 2023 ===
The League announced in December 2022 that in 2023 it would expand into a conference structure and play a five-tournament circuit. Franchises would be split between the Eastern and Western Conferences, with tournaments alternating play each week between the two conferences. Each conference plays two weekends, with the top two men's and women's teams from each conference qualifying for the Championship weekend. Additionally, the 2023 expansion added regional names to the teams for the first time in league history. The rebranded Texas Team and New York Locals would rejoin the men's competition, and add women's teams for the first time. Additionally, the league announced that the Golden State Retrievers and the Pittsburgh Steeltoes would join the league as expansion franchises.

On May 2, New Zealand Black Ferns star Ruby Tui announced that she had signed for the 2023 competition alongside her return to the Black Ferns Sevens team. The All Blacks subsequently announced that other New Zealand stars Stacey Waaka, Kelsey Teneti, Tysha Ikenasio, Manaia Nuku, Rhodes Featherstone and Kitiona Vai would also be competing. Teneti would ultimately not compete due to injury and would be replaced by Alena Saili.

For the Eastern Conference, the Kickoff Weekend took place at Q2 Stadium in Austin, Texas with the Conference Final held at Highmark Stadium in Pittsburgh, Pennsylvania. The Western Conference opened at TCO Stadium in Minneapolis, Minnesota, while the Conference Final took place at PayPal Park in San Jose. The Championship was held at Audi Field in Washington, D.C. The Pittsburgh and Minneapolis events were the first ever professional rugby events in those cities.

The Northern Loonies would win the women's championship while the SoCal Loggerheads would win the men's. The Rocky Mountain Experts would win the United Championship by virtue of being the only franchise to have both the men's and women's teams qualify for the Championship tournament.

2023 PR7s Women's Tournament Results
Tournament / Finish	1st	2nd	3rd	4th
Eastern Conference Kickoff	Southern Headliners	New York Locals	Pittsburgh Steeltoes	Texas Team
Western Conference Kickoff	Northern Loonies	Golden State Retrievers	Rhinos x SoCal Loggerheads	Rocky Mountain Experts
Western Conference Finals	Rocky Mountain Experts	Northern Loonies	Golden State Retrievers	Rhinos x SoCal Loggerheads
Eastern Conference Finals	Southern Headliners	New York Locals	Texas Team	Pittsburgh Steeltoes
Championship	Northern Loonies	New York Locals	Rocky Mountain Experts	Southern Headliners

2023 PR7s Men's Tournament Results
Tournament / Finish	1st	2nd	3rd	4th
Eastern Conference Kickoff	Texas Team	New York Locals	Pittsburgh Steeltoes	Southern Headliners
Western Conference Kickoff	Rocky Mountain Experts	Golden State Retrievers	Northern Loonies	SoCal Loggerheads
Western Conference Finals	SoCal Loggerheads	Rocky Mountain Experts	Northern Loonies	Golden State Retrievers
Eastern Conference Finals	Pittsburgh Steeltoes	Southern Headliners	New York Locals	Texas Team
Championship`	SoCal Loggerheads	Pittsburgh Steeltoes	Texas Team	Rocky Mountain Experts

=== 2024 ===
The league announced that the 2024 season would be shifted to after the Olympics. On October 22nd, the league announced that it would be hosting an All-Star Weekend in conjunction with USA Rugby that would have the USA Women's Sevens and USA Men's Sevens compete against a PR7s All-Star Team at Providence Park in Portland, Oregon. Kelly Griffin and Sammy Sullivan were announced as the PR7s Women's All-Star coaches and Richie Walker and Andrew Durutalo were announced as the PR7s Men's All-Star coaches. Rugby Canada also confirmed that the silver medal winning Canada women's national rugby sevens team would also participate in this competition. Despite cold and wet conditions the 2024 PR7s All-Star Tournament drew a crowd of nearly 5,000 for the six professional matches in addition to three amateur showcases.

=== Men's All-Star Results ===
Match	Winner	Score	Loser
1	USA Rugby	38-10	PR7s All-Stars
2	USA Rugby	36-34	PR7s All-Stars
3	USA Rugby	31-23	PR7s All-Stars

=== Women's All-Star Results ===
Match	Winner	Score	Loser
1	Rugby Canada	38-10	PR7s All-Stars
2	USA Rugby	36-34	PR7s All-Stars
3	Rugby Canada	31-23	USA Rugby

=== 2025 and beyond ===
No tournament was held during 2025, with Premier Rugby Sevens instead focusing on setting up academy and youth development camps in Portland, Oregon, the Bay Area, and the New York tri-state region.

In March 2026, PR7s released a statement that the league's professional circuit would remain paused for the foreseeable future, while the league continued to prioritize the development of PR7s RISE, the league's grassroots rugby development initiative focused on expanding high performance pathways and growing the game of rugby.

== Competitive Format ==
The league has played single day tournaments since inception, with men's and women's matches interchanging throughout the day. In the 2021 and 2022 seasons, all teams in the league would be onsite and play group stage matches with results determining participants in the final. The 2022 season had the first two tournaments determine the seeding for the knockout round championship.

In 2023, franchises were split between the Eastern and Western Conferences, with tournaments alternating play each week between the two conferences. Each conference plays two weekends, with the top two men's and women's teams from each conference qualifying for the Championship weekend. The league eliminated group stage play and instead moved to a knockout only format with semifinal matches leading into consolation and finals. Points are allocated based on finish, with the two conference kickoff weekends would award 13, 6, 3, 1 points for 1st through 4th place, respectively while the conference finals would award 19, 11, 5, 2. Teams would also be awarded points for finish in the Championship weekend for purposes of determining the United Championship winner.

The All-Star tournament in 2024 featured a round-robin between USA Rugby, the PR7s All Stars, and Rugby Canada on the women's side, and a best of three match series on the men's between USA Rugby and the PR7s All Stars.

== PR7s teams ==
=== Map ===
Locations of teams in Premier Rugby Sevens
Western Conference Teams Eastern Conference Teams

=== Current teams ===
Conference	Team	Metro Area	Joined
Western	Golden State Retrievers	San Jose, California	2023
Western	Northern Loonies	Minneapolis, Minnesota	2021
Western	Rocky Mountain Experts	Salt Lake City, Utah	2021
Western	SoCal Loggerheads	Los Angeles, California	2021
Eastern	New York Locals	New York, New York	2021
Eastern	Pittsburgh Steeltoes	Pittsburgh, Pennsylvania	2023
Eastern	Southern Headliners	Memphis, Tennessee	2021
Eastern	Texas Team	Austin, Texas	2021

=== Timeline ===
Current Members Former Only Men's Team Former Team Names

== Broadcast ==
=== United States and Canada ===
The 2021 championship matches of the tournaments were aired live on FS2 in the United States, and TSN in Canada. Preliminary matches were aired on FoxSports.com and TSN.ca.

All matches from the 2022 Championship were aired live on Fubo Sports Network.

In 2023, Fox Sports and CBS Sports televised portions the 2023 Championship season, with live programming on FS1, CBS Sports Network and Tubi. The championship finals were aired live on FS1.

The 2024 All-Star Game was carried on Fox Sports 2 in the US and on PR7s YouTube.

=== Europe and Rest of World ===
DAZN would acquire the broadcast rights for Europe in 2023.

RugbyPass acquired the global rights to the 2024 All-Star Game for distribution outside the US on RugbyPass TV.

== Sponsors ==
Samurai Sportswear has been the official kit and ball supplier since the league began in 2021. Samurai has provided the match kits for all teams and referees.

The league has had a data partnership with Sports Info Solutions (SIS) since 2022.

The Loggerheads franchise has been licensed by Rhinos Rugby Academy since 2022. In 2023, the Loggerheads were referred to as the Rhinos x Loggerheads as a part of the licensing agreement.

In January 2024, the league announced GoodSport as the official hydration partner.

2023 Kit Sponsors
Franchise	Sponsor
Rocky Mountain Experts	Sperry Rail Service
SoCal Loggerheads	Rhinos Rugby Academy
Southern Headliners	Kane Innovations
Golden State Retrievers	Petaluma
New York Locals	None
Texas Team	C4 Energy (back)
Northern Loonies	GoodSport (back)
Pittsburgh Steeltoes	None

== League champions ==
In 2022, the league named its women's and men's championship trophies after Kathy Flores and A. Jon Prusmack, respectively.

=== Men's Final ===
Year	Final			
Year	Champion	Score	Runner-up	Ref.
2021	Experts	(3) 19–19 (0)	Loggerheads	
2022	Loggerheads	32–22	Headliners	
2023	SoCal Loggerheads	10–5	Pittsburgh Steeltoes	

=== Women's Final ===
Year	Final			
Year	Champion	Score	Runner-up	Ref.
2021	Loonies	28–14	Headliners	
2022	Headliners	33–7	Loonies	
2023	Northern Loonies	21–10	New York Locals	

=== United Championship ===
Year	Champion	Ref.
2022	Headliners	
2023	Rocky Mountain Experts	

=== All-Star Games ===
Year	Winners		
Year	Men's	Women's	Ref.
2024	USA Rugby	Rugby Canada	

== Awards and honors ==
=== Women's Finals MVP ===
- 2021: Delaney Aikens
- 2022: Grace Kukutai
- 2023: Alev Kelter
- 2024 (All-Star): Asia Hogan-Rochester (Rugby Canada)

=== Men's Finals MVP ===
- 2021: Logan Tago
- 2022: Brock Ian Gallagher
- 2023: Branco du Preez
- 2024 (All-Star): Lucas Lacamp (USA Rugby)

=== Women's Defensive Player of the Year ===
- 2023: Manaia Nuku

=== Men's Defensive Player of the Year ===
- 2023: Craig Hunt

=== Women's Comeback Player of the Year ===
- 2023: Neariah "Nene" Weathers

=== Men's Comeback Player of the Year ===
- 2023: Ben Pinkelman

=== Women's Rising Star ===
- 2023: Monique Coffey

=== Men's Rising Star ===
- 2023: Chris Aurich

== See also ==
- United States women's national rugby sevens team
- United States national rugby sevens team (men's)
- Major League Rugby
- Women's Premier League
