= Kaili Lukan =

Canadian rugby sevens player

- Born: February 20, 1994 (age 32) Willemstad, Curaçao
- Height: 1.73 m (5 ft 8 in)
- Weight: 68 kg (150 lb)
- University: University of Wisconsin-Green Bay

Rugby union career
- Position(s): Centre, wing
National sevens team
| Years | Team | Comps |
| 2017-present | Canada | |
Medal record
Women's rugby sevens
Representing Canada
Pan American Games
| Gold medal – first place | 2019 Lima | Team competition |

Kaili Lukan is a Canadian rugby sevens player. She made her debut with the senior national team in June 2017 during the Clermont-Ferrand, France leg of the HSBC World Rugby Women's Sevens Series. She won a gold medal at the 2019 Pan American Games as a member of the Canada women's national rugby sevens team. Lukan was named to the HSBC Sydney Series, Dream Team in February, 2020. Lukan is known for her athleticism, speed and ball handling. She is a crossover athlete who played NCAA Division I basketball at the University of Wisconsin-Green Bay (known for sporting purposes as Green Bay) from 2012 to 2016 prior to joining Canada's national rugby sevens team. Lukan scored 1,028 points and won various conference honors over her Green Bay basketball career, including 2016 Horizon League Defensive Player of the Year. Her older sister Megan Lukan also played basketball at Green Bay and was a member of the Canada women's national rugby sevens team that won a bronze medal during the 2016 Rio Olympics. She was born in Willemstad, Curaçao but spent her early years in Barrie, Ontario. Lukan has four siblings beside her sister Megan, including two other sisters and two brothers. She is openly lesbian.

== Career ==
In June 2021, Lukan was named to Canada's 2020 Summer Olympics team.

== Green Bay statistics ==
Legend
| GP | Games played | GS | Games started | MPG | Minutes per game |
| FG% | Field goal percentage | 3P% | 3-point field goal percentage | FT% | Free throw percentage |
| RPG | Rebounds per game | APG | Assists per game | SPG | Steals per game |
| BPG | Blocks per game | PPG | Points per game | **Bold** | Career high |

| Year | Team | GP | Points | FG% | 3P% | FT% | RPG | APG | SPG | BPG | PPG |
|---|---|---|---|---|---|---|---|---|---|---|---|
| 2012-13 | Green Bay | 12 | 17 | 41.2% | **33.3%** | 33.3% | 1.3 | 0.7 | 0.8 | - | 1.4 |
| 2013-14 | Green Bay | 32 | **367** | **47.5%** | 28.8% | 67.8% | 3.8 | 2.1 | 1.3 | 0.1 | **11.5** |
| 2014-15 | Green Bay | **33** | 317 | 44.4% | 22.4% | **86.0%** | 4.4 | 2.5 | 1.5 | 0.0 | 9.6 |
| 2015-16 | Green Bay | **33** | 327 | 42.9% | 30.6% | 71.6% | **4.7** | **3.0** | **2.3** | **0.2** | 9.9 |
| Career | | 110 | 1028 | 44.9% | 27.7% | 74.1% | 4.0 | 2.3 | 1.6 | 0.1 | 9.3 |
