= Alena Olsen =

American rugby union player (born 1995)

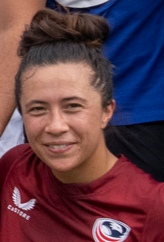
- Olsen in 2024
- Born: December 6, 1995 (age 30) Grand Rapids, Michigan, U.S.
- Height: 5 ft 4 in (1.63 m)
- Weight: 139 lb (63 kg)

Rugby union career
- Position(s): Scrumhalf, Flyhalf
National sevens team
Years	Team	Comps
	United States	53 (43 pts)
Medal record
Women's rugby sevens
Representing United States
Olympic Games
Bronze medal – third place	2024 Paris	Team competition
Pan American Games
Silver medal – second place	2015 Toronto	Team competition

Alena Olsen (/əˈleɪnə/ ə-LAY-nə; born December 6, 1995) is an American rugby sevens player. She captains the Headliners women's team in the Premier Rugby Sevens competition.

In 2021, Olsen and some of her teammates released a video that urged fans to sign the Global Climate Pledge, an initiative by the United States Green Chamber of Commerce.

Olsen competed for the United States at the 2022 Rugby World Cup Sevens in Cape Town. They lost to France in the bronze medal final and finished fourth overall.

In 2024, Olsen competed for the United States in the 2024 Paris Olympics, where she and her team won a bronze medal, a first for Team USA Rugby Sevens.

== Rugby career ==
=== College career ===
Prior to starting her career at the University of Michigan at the age of 18, Olsen never played rugby before. One day on campus she attended a practice and was hooked. At Michigan, she earned All-American honors (2015, 2016) and was nominated to the Collegiate Rugby Championship Dream Team (2016, 2017).

=== National Sevens Career ===
Olsen made her USA Rugby debut in Glendale 7s (2019) where the United States won the tournament, defeating Australia 26-7 in the final. Olsen also played in the 2022 Rugby World Cup (7s) in Cape Town, South Africa. The U.S. finished the tournament in fourth, falling to France in the bronze medal match.

Olsen participated in the 2024 Paris Olympics, where she and her team won a bronze medal, a first for Team USA Rugby Sevens.

=== Premier Rugby Sevens ===
==== 2021 ====
Olsen has been playing with the Headliners of Premier Rugby Sevens since the inaugural tournament in 2021. The Headliners nearly clinched the first-ever PR7s Women's Championship but fell 28-14, to the Loonies in the Finals.

==== 2022 ====
The Headliners and Olsen had an impressive 2022 campaign, notching two tournament wins, including the PR7s Championship in Austin, Texas. The Headliners fell in the first stop of the circuit in San Jose where the Loggerheads hoisted the first trophy of the season. The Headliners came back to win the next two tournaments. Their first win in Washington D.C., started a 4-tournament winning streak which extended into the 2023 season.

The Women's Championship wasn't the only trophy the team earned that season. The men's and women's Headliners won the first-ever United Championship.

==== 2023 ====
Olsen played in all three tournaments the Southern Headliners participated in that season, aiding the team to four wins and two losses. The Headliners picked up right where left left off in Austin, clinching the first tournament win of the season after defeating the New York Locals, 21-12.

The second stop of the circuit was in Pittsburgh, Pennsylvania, where the Headliners dominated once again. After topping the Texas Team 20-19, the Headliners faced the Locals in the Finals. The Headliners continued their dominance against the Locals, winning 12-7. After accumulating the most points in the Eastern Conference, the Southern Headliners advanced to the Championship in Washington, D.C.

At the Championship, the Locals crushed the Headliners' hot streak, eliminating them from the title match. After an impressive start to the season, the Headliners ended the year in fourth place after falling, 10-7 to the Rocky Mountain Experts in the third-place match.

== Statistics ==
Team	Season	GP	Tries	Points	Tackles	Carries
Southern Headliners	2023	6	1	9	14	15
