= United States Green Chamber of Commerce =

American networking organization

US Green Chamber
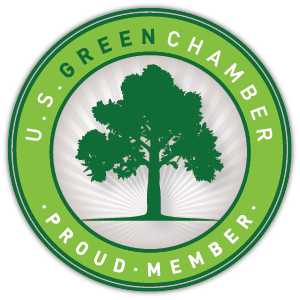
- Founded: February 23, 2011
- Founder: David Steel and Peter Zahn
- Type: Advocacy group
- Purpose: Sustainable Business Advocacy
- Location: San Diego, Orlando
- Origins: San Diego, CA
- Region served: United States
- Method: Media attention, education, advocacy
- Key people: Michelle Thatcher, CEO; Jim Bunch, Board Chairman
- Website: www.usgreenchamber.com
- Formerly called: Green Chamber of San Diego County

The United States Green Chamber of Commerce (USGCC) is a national networking organization for businesses and community organizations that emphasize green and sustainable business practices. It asserts that sustainable business practices "spur innovation, job creation, energy efficiency and an overall brighter economic future through the triple bottom line: economic, environmental, and social sustainability." Founded in California, it has expanded into several US states including Maryland, Missouri, Florida, Iowa, Massachusetts, and New York. As of 2022 CEO Michelle Thatcher and Board of Directors chair Jim Bunch lead the US Green Chamber of Commerce.

== About ==
The USGCC was launched in 2011 as a nationwide expansion of the Green Chamber of San Diego County, co-founded by David Steel and Peter Zahn in 2009.

The USGCC has created strategic alliances with like-minded groups such as E2 (Environmental Entrepreneurs, Entrepreneurs' Organization), chambers and workforce partnerships to further its purpose of advancing best practices related to corporate sustainability and social responsibility.

Prominent members include Toyota, Kimpton Hotels, Northwestern Mutual, and Union Bank.

== See also ==
- Sustainability
- Triple bottom line
- Climate change
