= Naya Tapper =

American rugby sevens player (born 1994)

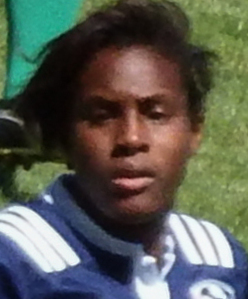
- Tapper in 2017

Personal information
- Full name: Naya Elena Tapper
- Born: August 3, 1994 (age 32) Beaufort, South Carolina, U.S.
- Education: University of North Carolina at Chapel Hill (BS)
- Relative: Mark LeGree (brother)
- Website: nayatapper.com
- Height: 5 ft 9 in (175 cm)
- Weight: 176 lb (80 kg)

Rugby union career
- Position: Wing
Amateur team(s)
Years	Team	Apps	(Points)
2012–2016	North Carolina		
Senior career
Years	Team	Apps	(Points)
2021–2023	Southern Headliners		
International career
Years	Team	Apps	(Points)
2016–2017	United States XVs	12	
National sevens team
Years	Team		Comps
2016–2024	United States 7s		
Medal record
Women's rugby sevens
Representing the United States
Olympic Games
Bronze medal – third place	2024 Paris	Team competition
Pan American Games
Silver medal – second place	2019 Lima	Team competition

Naya Elena Tapper (born August 3, 1994) is an American retired rugby sevens player. She was a co-captain of the United States women's rugby sevens team and competed in rugby sevens at the 2020 Summer Olympics in Tokyo and the 2024 Summer Olympics in Paris, where Team USA took home the bronze medal.

Tapper was the first U.S. woman to reach 100 tries and is the all-time leading try scorer for the USA women's team. Her chase down tackle that saved a try against Ireland at the 2021 Dubai Sevens was named the #1 Play on ESPN's SportCenter Top 10 plays.

== Early life and education ==
Tapper was born in Beaufort, South Carolina, to Norman Tapper and Juanita Nater-Tapper, who are of Jamaican and Puerto Rican descent. She grew up in Charlotte, North Carolina, where she attended West Mecklenburg High School and was an All-American athlete in track and field.

Her older brother, Mark LeGree, played American football in the NFL. As a child, Tapper dreamt of following in his footsteps, feeling drawn to the aggressive energy of the sport, but grew to realize it was not a viable option for a girl.

Tapper began her rugby career at age 18, during her first year of college at the University of North Carolina at Chapel Hill. She majored in exercise and sport science with a minor in Spanish, graduating in 2016.

== Career ==
=== U.S. women's national team ===
Tapper was first recruited to join the United States women's national rugby sevens team only two months after she first started playing rugby in her first year of college. She turned down the offer in order to focus on academics. But in her last semester of college in 2016, Tapper made her professional debut as a member of the United States women's national rugby sevens team, known as the Eagles, at the 2016 São Paulo Women's Sevens.

Later that year, she was selected to compete in rugby fifteens for the USA Eagles at the Women's Rugby Super Series. She was selected for the squad to the 2017 Women's Rugby World Cup in Ireland, where USA placed fourth.

Tapper was among 12 women rugby sevens players selected to represent Team USA at the Tokyo 2020 Olympic Games. She also represented the United States at the 2022 Rugby World Cup Sevens in Cape Town.

Tapper was named a team co-captain in 2022, leading Team USA to a third place finish and automatic qualification for the 2024 Olympics in Paris, where the team won the bronze medal.

=== Club career ===
Tapper signed on as a player and ambassador for the inaugural season of Premier Rugby Sevens in 2021. She was named captain of the Southern Headliners women's team for the 2021 Championship in Memphis. The team would finish second to the Loonies despite winning in group play.

Though Tapper was named to the 2022 roster for the Headliners as well, she did not return to the field for the team until 2023, once again as captain. She would lead the team to series wins at the Eastern Conference Kickoff in Austin, as well as at the Eastern Conference Finals in Pittsburgh. The Headliners would qualify for the championship tournament in Washington, D.C. but would ultimately fall to New York Locals in the semifinals. Tapper was named a finalist for season MVP, ultimately losing out to fellow US teammate Alev Kelter.

=== Retirement ===
Tapper retired from playing rugby at the end of the 2024 Summer Olympics.

== Personal life ==
Tapper has been involved with a number of non-profit initiatives around growing participation rates in rugby, particularly in the southern United States. She has been a board member of Memphis Inner City Rugby since 2021.

In 2020, Tapper appeared as a model on an episode of Project Runway, featuring athletes set to compete in the 2020 Summer Olympics and Paralympics.

As of August 2024, Tapper lives in San Diego, California.
