= Kayla Moleschi =

Canadian rugby sevens player

- Born: October 25, 1990 (age 36) Williams Lake, British Columbia
- Height: 1.59 m (5 ft 3 in)
- Weight: 65 kg (143 lb)

Rugby union career
National sevens team
Years	Team	Comps
2011-present	Canada 7s	
Medal record
Women's rugby sevens
Representing Canada
Olympic Games
Bronze medal – third place	2016 Rio de Janeiro	Team competition
Pan American Games
Gold medal – first place	2015 Toronto	Team competition
Gold medal – first place	2019 Lima	Team competition
World Cup 7s
Silver medal – second place	2013 Russia	Team competition

Kayla Moleschi (born October 25, 1990) is a Canadian rugby union player. She won a gold medal at the 2015 Pan American Games as a member of the Canadian women's rugby sevens team. She is known as a core contributor with an explosive step.

== Career ==
In 2016, Moleschi was named to Canada's first ever women's rugby sevens Olympic team and also named Rugby Canada 2016 Women's Sevens Player.

In June 2021, Moleschi was named to Canada's 2020 Summer Olympics team.
