= Pamphinette Buisa =

Canadian rugby union and sevens player

- Born: 28 December 1996 (age 29) Victoria, British Columbia
- Height: 1.80 m (5 ft 11 in)
- Weight: 75 kg (165 lb; 11 st 11 lb)
- University: University of Victoria

Rugby union career
- Position: Wing
International career
Years	Team	Apps	(Points)
	Canada	14	
- Correct as of 2024-12-19
National sevens team
Years	Team		Comps
2017–present	Canada		
Medal record
Women's rugby sevens
Representing Canada
World Cup
Silver medal – second place	2025 England	Team competition
Pan American Games
Gold medal – first place	2019 Lima	Team competition

Pamphinette "Pam" Buisa (born 28 December 1996) is a Canadian rugby union and sevens player. She has represented Canada at an international level.

== Career ==
Buisa won a gold medal at the 2019 Pan American Games as a member of the Canada women's national rugby sevens team. Alongside teammates Caroline Crossley and Charity Williams, Buisa represents the national women's sevens team on the Rugby Canada Black, Indigenous, and People of Colour Working Group which was established on 17 July 2020.

In June 2021, Buisa was named to Canada's 2020 Summer Olympics team. She competed for Canada at the 2022 Rugby World Cup Sevens in Cape Town. They placed sixth overall after losing to Fiji in the fifth place final.

Buisa was added to Canada's fifteens team to the 2021 Rugby World Cup after Laura Russell was ruled out due to injury. In 2023, She was named in Canada's traveling squad for their test against the Springbok women and for the Pacific Four Series.

In 2025, she was initially named in Canada's World Cup squad but was ruled out after she sustained an injury in their warm-up match against Ireland, she was replaced by Julia Omokhuale.
