= Temitope Ogunjimi =

Canadian rugby sevens player

- Born: July 11, 1995 (age 31) Lagos, Nigeria
- Height: 1.65 m (5 ft 5 in)
- Weight: 73 kg (161 lb)
- University: University of Calgary

Rugby union career
- Position: Outside centre
National sevens team
Years	Team	Comps
2018-present	Canada	
Medal record
Women's rugby sevens
Representing Canada
Pan American Games
Gold medal – first place	2019 Lima	Team competition

Temitope Ogunjimi is a Canadian rugby sevens player. She won a gold medal at the 2019 Pan American Games as a member of the Canada women's national rugby sevens team. Ogunjimi started her athletic career primarily as a wrestler, winning a gold medal at the 2013 Canada Summer Games as well as the 2014 Junior Pan American Championships. It was not until her third year of university that she took up rugby full-time. She graduated from the University of Calgary with a degree in Law and Society.
