= Caroline Crossley =

Canadian rugby sevens player

- Born: 19 April 1998 (age 28) New Westminster, British Columbia
- Height: 1.75 m (5 ft 9 in)
- Weight: 80 kg (176 lb)
- University: University of Victoria McGill University

Rugby union career
- Position: Lock
International career
Years	Team	Apps	(Points)
	Canada	13	(10)
- Correct as of 2025-09-27
National sevens team
Years	Team		Comps
2018-present	Canada		
Medal record
Women's rugby sevens
Representing Canada
Olympic Games
Silver medal – second place	2024 Paris	Team competition
Pan American Games
Gold medal – first place	2019 Lima	Team competition
Silver medal – second place	2023 Lima	Team competition
World Cup
Silver medal – second place	2025 England	Team competition

Caroline Isabel Ives Crossley (born 19 April 1998) is a Canadian rugby sevens player. She won a gold medal at the 2019 Pan American Games as a member of the Canada women's national rugby sevens team. CBC Sports called Crossley a "rising star" on the Canadian rugby 7s team in 2019.

== Rugby career ==
Alongside teammates Pam Buisa and Charity Williams, Crossley also represents the national women's sevens team on the Rugby Canada Black, Indigenous, and People of Colour Working Group which was established on 17 July 2020.

She was chosen for the 2024 Summer Olympics in Paris, France. The team won a silver medal, coming from 0–12 behind to defeat Australia 21–12 in the semi-finals, before losing the final to New Zealand.

She was named in the Canadian side for the 2025 Pacific Four Series. Later in July, she made the Canadian squad to the Rugby World Cup in England.

== Personal life ==
Crossley is currently pursuing a BCL/JD at McGill University Faculty of Law.
