= Asia Hogan-Rochester =

Canadian rugby sevens player

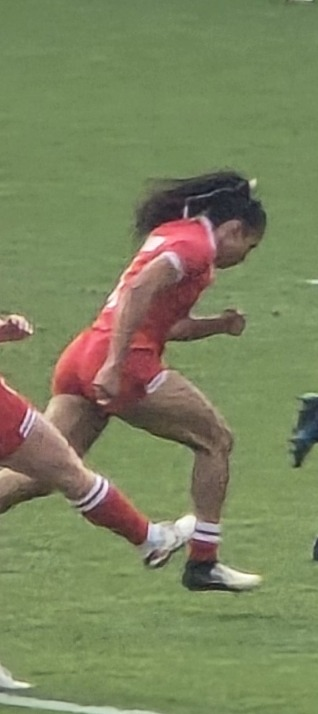
- 2025 Women's Rugby World Cup final
- Born: 20 April 1999 (age 27) Toronto, Ontario
- Height: 1.70 m (5 ft 7 in)
- Weight: 66 kg (146 lb)
- University: York University

Rugby union career
- Position: Wing
- Current team: Sale Sharks Women
Senior career
| Years | Team | Apps | (Points) |
| 2026– | Sale Sharks Women | | |
International career
| Years | Team | Apps | (Points) |
| 2024– | Canada | 8 | (35) |
- Correct as of 2025-09-27
National sevens team
| Years | Team | | Comps |
| 2019–present | Canada | | |
Medal record
Women's rugby sevens
Representing Canada
Olympics
| Silver medal – second place | 2024 Paris | Team competition |
Pan American Games
| Gold medal – first place | 2019 Lima | Team competition |
Women's rugby union
Representing Canada
World Cup
| Silver medal – second place | 2025 England | Team competition |

Asia Clarice Hogan-Rochester (born 20 April 1999) is a Canadian rugby sevens and fifteens player for Sale Sharks Women in Premiership Women's Rugby. They (Note: Hogan-Rochester uses the pronoun they.) won a silver medal at the 2024 Summer Olympics.

== Rugby career ==
Asia won a gold medal at the 2019 Pan American Games as a member of the Canada women's national rugby sevens team. After the win over the United States, Hogan-Rochester said that "It's unreal, I can't believe this has happened. This was our biggest opponent so we were a bit (nervous). But we definitely used those nerves coming into this final and we came out on top thankfully." Hogan-Rochester primarily plays on the wing or as fullback.

They were chosen for the 2024 Summer Olympics in Paris, France. The team won a silver medal, coming from 0–12 behind to defeat Australia 21–12 in the semi-finals, before losing the final to New Zealand.

They were named in Canada's squad for the 2025 Pacific Four Series. In July, they made the selection into Canada's Rugby World Cup squad and helped take Canada to the final against England. In the final, they opened scoring with a try in the fifth minute, going on to score both of Canada's tries in the 13–33 loss. With five tries across the tournament, they made it into the all-star team of the knock-out stage.

Hogan-Rochester signed for Sale Sharks Women during the 2025-2026 Premiership Women's Rugby season. They will join up with the team in January 2026.
