= 2018 RAN Women's Sevens =

Women's rugby sevens tournament

- Hosts: Saint James
- Date: 22–23 September
- Nations: 10

Final positions
- Champions: Mexico
- Runners-up: Trinidad and Tobago
- Third: Jamaica

Series details
- Matches played: 29

The 2018 RAN Women's Sevens was the 14th edition of the annual rugby sevens tournament organized by Rugby Americas North. It will be played at the Barbados Polo Club in Saint James, Barbados, with the winner eligible for the 2019 Hong Kong Women's Sevens qualifier tournament and two teams advancing to the 2019 Pan American Games.

== Teams ==
The following ten teams will participate:

- Bahamas
- Barbados
- Bermuda
- Curaçao
- Dominican Republic
- Guyana
- Jamaica
- Mexico
- Saint Lucia
- Trinidad and Tobago

== Pool stage ==
All times in Atlantic Standard Time (UTC−04:00)

=== Pool A ===
Teams	Pld	W	D	L	PF	PA	+/−	Pts
Mexico	4	3	0	1	102	26	+76	10
Saint Lucia	4	3	0	1	71	32	+39	10
Dominican Republic	4	2	1	1	66	24	+42	9
Guyana	4	1	1	2	56	59	−3	7
Barbados	4	0	0	4	5	131	−126	4

22 September 2018
9:30

Mexico	50−0	Barbados

22 September 2018
9:30

Guyana	0−25	Saint Lucia

22 September 2018
11:20

Dominican Republic	10−0	Barbados

22 September 2018
11:20

Mexico	20−5	Saint Lucia

22 September 2018
13:22

Mexico	5−14	Dominican Republic

22 September 2018
13:22

Guyana	42−0	Barbados

22 September 2018
15:22

Barbados	5−29	Saint Lucia

22 September 2018
15:22

Guyana	7−7	Dominican Republic

23 September 2018
9:22

Mexico	27−7	Guyana

23 September 2018
9:22

Dominican Republic	7−12	Saint Lucia

=== Pool B ===
Teams	Pld	W	D	L	PF	PA	+/−	Pts
Trinidad and Tobago	3	3	1	0	166	12	+154	11
Jamaica	3	3	1	0	147	19	+128	11
Bahamas	4	2	0	2	82	69	+13	8
Bermuda	4	1	0	3	59	98	−39	6
Curaçao	4	0	0	4	0	256	−256	4

22 September 2018
9:52

Jamaica	78−0	Curaçao

22 September 2018
9:52

Trinidad and Tobago	42−0	Bahamas

22 September 2018
11:42

Jamaica	17−7	Bahamas

22 September 2018
11:42

Bermuda	49−0	Curaçao

22 September 2018
13:44

Jamaica	40−0	Bermuda

22 September 2018
13:44

Trinidad and Tobago	78−0	Curaçao

22 September 2018
15:44

Trinidad and Tobago	34−0	Bermuda

22 September 2018
15:44

Bahamas	51−0	Curaçao

23 September 2018
9:44

Jamaica	12−12	Trinidad and Tobago

23 September 2018
9:44

Bermuda	10−24	Bahamas

== Knockout stage ==
Trophy

Final
23 September - 11:34
Barbados	53
Curaçao	0

Plate

Semi-finals
23 September - 11:12
Dominican Republic	41
Bermuda	0
23 September - 11:12
Bahamas	20
Guyana	5

Final
23 September - 13:58
Dominican Republic	14
Bahamas	5
Third place
23 September - 13:58
Bermuda	0
Guyana	32

Cup

Semi-finals
23 September - 12:30
Mexico	19
Jamaica	5
23 September - 12:52
Trinidad and Tobago	22
Saint Lucia	5

Final
23 September - 16:10
Mexico	15
Trinidad and Tobago	10
Third place
23 September - 15:26
Jamaica	5
Saint Lucia	0

== Standings ==
Key to colours in group tables
Green fill	Qualified to 2019 Hong Kong Women's Sevens
Blue bar	Qualified to 2019 Pan American Games

Rank	Team
1st place, gold medalist(s)	Mexico
2nd place, silver medalist(s)	Trinidad and Tobago
3rd place, bronze medalist(s)	Jamaica
4	Saint Lucia
5	Dominican Republic
6	Bahamas
7	Guyana
8	Bermuda
9	Barbados
10	Curaçao

== See also ==
- 2019 Hong Kong Women's Sevens
