= Breanne Nicholas =

Canadian rugby sevens player

- Born: February 20, 1994 (age 32) Chatham, Ontario
- Height: 1.63 m (5 ft 4 in)
- Weight: 64 kg (141 lb)
- University: Western University

Rugby union career
- Position: Outside centre
National sevens team
Years	Team	Comps
2016–present	Canada	
Medal record
Women's rugby sevens
Representing Canada
Pan American Games
Gold medal – first place	2019 Lima	Team
Silver medal – second place	2023 Santiago	Team

Breanne Nicholas (born February 20, 1994) is a Canadian rugby sevens player. She won a gold medal at the 2019 Pan American Games as a member of the Canada women's national rugby sevens team.

In June 2021, Nicholas was named to Canada's 2020 Summer Olympics team. She also competed for Canada at the 2022 Rugby World Cup Sevens in Cape Town. They placed sixth overall after losing to Fiji in the fifth place final.
