= Yang Min (rugby union) =

Chinese rugby sevens player

Personal information
- Nationality: Chinese
- Born: 4 November 1994 (age 31) Taizhou, Jiangsu, China

Sport
- Sport: Rugby sevens

Yang Min (born 4 November 1994) is a Chinese rugby sevens player. She competed in the women's tournament at the 2020 Summer Olympics.
