= Charity Williams =

Canadian rugby sevens player

Charity Williams OLY
- Full name: Charity Camile Williams
- Born: October 20, 1996 (age 30) Toronto, Ontario, Canada
- Height: 1.62 m (5 ft 4 in)
- Weight: 68 kg (150 lb)

Rugby union career
National sevens team
Years	Team	Comps
2015–Present	Canada	124 (350)
Medal record
Women's rugby sevens
Representing Canada
Olympic Games
Silver medal – second place	2024 Paris	Team competition
Bronze medal – third place	2016 Rio de Janeiro	Team competition
Youth Olympic Games
Silver medal – second place	2014 Nanjing	Team competition

Charity Camile Williams (born October 20, 1996) is a Canadian rugby sevens player.

== Career ==
Williams participated in gymnastics during her childhood and wanted to compete on the Olympic stage. She soon realized that her goal of going to the Olympics could not be achieved in gymnastics. In Grade 10 a friend introduced her to rugby, so she decided to attend practice and fell in love with her new-found sport.

In 2016, Williams was named to Canada's first ever women's rugby sevens Olympic team.

Alongside teammates Pam Buisa and Caroline Crossley, Williams represents the national women's sevens team on the Rugby Canada Black, Indigenous, and People of Colour Working Group which was established on July 17, 2020.

In June 2021, Williams was named to Canada's 2020 Summer Olympics team.

She was chosen for the 2024 Summer Olympics in Paris, France. The team won a silver medal, coming from 0-12 behind to defeat Australia 21-12 in the semi-finals, before losing the final to New Zealand.

== Achievements and honours ==
- 2017, Canada Sevens Langford dream team.
- 2024, Silver Medal (Canada), 2024 Olympics (Paris)
