= Cheta Emba =

American rugby union player

- Born: July 26, 1993 (age 33); Richmond, Virginia
- Education: Harvard University
- Height: 5 ft 10 in (178 cm)
- Weight: 175 lb (79 kg)

Rugby union career
- Position(s): Full back (XV), Wing (XV), Prop (7s), Wing (7s)
Senior career
Years	Team	Apps	(Points)
	Boston Banshees	2	(2)
International career
Years	Team	Apps	(Points)
2015-	United States	17	(15)
National sevens team
Years	Team		Comps
2016	United States		33
Medal record
Women's rugby sevens
Representing United States
Pan American Games
Silver medal – second place	2019 Lima	Team competition
Association football career
- Position: Goalkeeper
Youth career
- 2007–2011: Governor's Green Dragons
College career
Years	Team	Apps	(Gls)
2011–2014	Harvard Crimson	35	(0)

Cheta Emba (born July 16, 1993) is an American rugby union player. She has competed for the United States in the 2017 and 2025 Women's Rugby World Cups. She has also represented the U.S. women's sevens team in the 2020 Summer Olympics.

== Early career ==
Emba attended Maggie L. Walker Governor's School, she was a goalkeeper on the soccer team and a forward on the basketball team. She played soccer and began her rugby career in her junior year at Harvard University where she majored in molecular cellular biology with a minor in Spanish. She received All-Academic and All-Conference honors while at Harvard.

== Rugby career ==
In her senior year she was selected for the Eagles squad to the 2015 Women's Rugby Super Series in Canada. She debuted for the United States in 2016 and was selected for the squad to the 2017 Rugby World Cup in Ireland. Emba competed for the U.S. women's sevens team in the 2020 Summer Olympics in Tokyo.

Emba was selected to represent the United States at the 2022 Rugby World Cup Sevens in Cape Town.

At the club level, she has played for NOVA and Beantown Rugby Club. She is also a member of the Boston Banshees in the inaugural season of the Women's Elite Rugby league. In 2025, she started in the Eagles test against Japan which her side lost 33–39 in Los Angeles on April 26.

On July 17, 2025, she was named in the Eagles side to the Women's Rugby World Cup in England.
