= Abby Gustaitis =

American rugby union player (born 1991)

Personal information
- Born: May 9, 1991 (age 35) Baltimore, Maryland, U.S.
- Home town: White Hall, Maryland, U.S.
- Education: North Harford High School; University of Maryland
- Height: 5 ft 11 in (180 cm)
- Weight: 165 lb (75 kg)

Rugby union career
- Position(s): Flanker, Lock, Prop (7s)
Senior career
Years	Team	Apps	(Points)
2022–2023	Southern Headliners		
International career
Years	Team	Apps	(Points)
2016–	United States	7	(-)
Medal record
Women's rugby sevens
Representing the United States
Pan American Games
Silver medal – second place	2019 Lima	Team competition

Abby Gustaitis (born May 9, 1991) is an American rugby union player. She debuted for the United States against France in 2016. She was selected for the squad to the 2017 Women's Rugby World Cup in Ireland.

Gustaitis was introduced to the sport of rugby by a friend while attending the University of Maryland. After the 2017 World Cup she was recruited to the University of Canberra's sevens team.

== Early life ==
Gustaitis is the daughter of Stan and Tammy Gustaitis. She has two older brothers. She attended North Harford High School, where she played basketball and graduated in 2009. She attended the University of Maryland, College Park and graduated with a degree in Physiology and Neurobiology in 2013 .

Gustaitis discovered rugby as a freshman at University and began to receive invitations to national team camps shortly thereafter. Despite an initial focus on 15s, she crossed over to sevens to achieve a dream of making the Olympics. After missing out on inclusion in the roster for the 2016 Rio Olympics, she weighed giving up the sport entirely.

== Professional career ==
=== USA Sevens ===
Gustaitis was part of the USA Women's Sevens roster for the 2018 Sevens World Cup in San Francisco, CA, where she led the U.S. to a fourth-place finish. She was also on the roster for 2019 Pan American Games where they finished second. Gustaitis also was part of the team that won the first-ever gold medal HSBC series win for the US Women in Biarritz, France as well as the team that won the first home tournament win in Colorado.

Gustaitis was captain for Team USA at the 2021 Tokyo Olympics. The US would finish just shy of the medal rounds after losing in the quarterfinals to Team GB.

In January 2022, Gustaitis was surprisingly dropped from the US Women's program by head coach Emilie Bydwell.

=== Premier Rugby Sevens ===
Gustaitis was named part of the initial 10 ambassadors for Premier Rugby Sevens 2021 Inaugural Championship. She was initially named captain of the Loggerheads' women's team, however due to injury was unable to compete.

In 2022, Gustaitis moved to the Headliners team. She played a key role for the team that would win both the women's series championship as well as the first United Championship.

She would return to the Headliners in 2023. She would be named Player of the Tournament for the Eastern Conference Finals in Pittsburgh. The Headliners would ultimately qualify for the 2023 Championship but finish fourth after losing to the New York Locals in the semifinals.

=== Post-International Career ===
Gustaitis has been a color commentator World Rugby, NBC Sports and Premier Rugby Sevens. She is also an ambassador for HSBC and their global program focused on women's rugby. She was named an assistant coach of the US Naval Academy's women's rugby team in 2023.
