= Stephanie Rovetti =

American rugby player (born 1991)

Steph Rovetti
Personal information
- Full name: Stephanie Rovetti
- Born: October 2, 1991 (age 35)
- Home town: Reno, Nevada, U.S.
- Education: Reno High School; Brigham Young University (BS); California State University, Fresno (MPA)
- Height: 5 ft 6 in (168 cm)
- Weight: 140 lb (64 kg)

Rugby union career
- Position(s): Fly Half, Wing (7s)
International career
Years	Team	Apps	(Points)
2019-	United States		
Medal record
Women's rugby sevens
Representing United States
Olympic Games
Bronze medal – third place	2024 Paris	Team competition

Stephanie Rovetti (/roʊˈvɛti/ roh-VET-ee; born October 2, 1991) is an American rugby player.

== Career ==
She debuted for the United States in 2018. Rovetti was a basketball player in college and began playing rugby at age 24, after maxing out her NCAA eligibility for basketball.

At the 2024 Summer Olympics, Rovetti was on the bronze medal-winning team for the United States in rugby sevens.

== Personal life ==
Rovetti attended Reno High School and graduated in 2010. After high school, she graduated from BYU with B.S. in public health in 2014 and from California State University, Fresno with an MPA in Public Administration in 2016. She is currently the Director of Operations for the University of San Diego basketball team.
