= Rugby sevens at the Summer Olympics =

- IOC Code: RU7
- Governing body: World Rugby
- Events: 2 (men: 1; women: 1)

Summer Olympics
- 1896; 1900; 1904; 1908; 1912; 1920; 1924; 1928; 1932; 1936; 1948; 1952; 1956; 1960; 1964; 1968; 1972; 1976; 1980; 1984; 1988; 1992; 1996; 2000; 2004; 2008; 2012; 2016; 2020; 2024; 2028; 2032
- Medalists

Rugby sevens was played at the Olympics for the first time at the 2016 Summer Olympics, with both men's and women's contests. It was added to the Olympics following the decision of the 121st IOC Session in Copenhagen in October 2009. The champions for the inaugural rugby sevens tournament in 2016 were Fiji for the men and Australia for the women. Prior to 2016, 15-a-side matches were played in 1900, 1908, 1920, and 1924.

== Efforts to include rugby sevens in the Olympics ==
=== 1932 bid ===
A Scottish man based in Canada, Mr. W. Hastie Cochrane, was unsuccessful in his bid to get rugby sevens into the 1932 Los Angeles Olympics: the IOC stated that the limit of max two exhibition sports cannot be exceeded, and American football and lacrosse had already been planned. All three sports will be on the program in the 2028 Los Angeles Olympics (American football will be flag football, and lacrosse will be six-a-side).

=== 2012 bid ===
Rugby sevens was one of five sports—golf, karate, roller sports, rugby, and squash—that submitted a proposal to the IOC at the 117th IOC Session meeting in Singapore in 2005 for inclusion in the 2012 games. The IOC stated that no sport would be added unless others were dropped. However, the selection of two sports out of the five nominees as potential 2012 sports went to squash and karate, as determined by a voting procedure.

=== 2016 bid ===
Most recently, rugby sevens competed with golf for two available spaces in the 2016 Olympics. The final decision was made at the IOC Session in Copenhagen in October 2009: the IRB used a number of high-profile people and events to influence the IOC to include sevens at the 2016 games. In March 2009, two senior delegates from the IOC attended the 2009 Rugby World Cup Sevens in Dubai at the invitation of the IRB.

The event attracted 78,000 fans over the three days and saw Wales crowned Men's World Champions, while Australia won the first ever Women's World Cup.

Along with the World Cup, the IRB enlisted some of rugby's biggest names to assist in the bid. In March 2009, Jonah Lomu and Lawrence Dallaglio were announced as ambassadors for the bid, and in April 2009 Waisale Serevi was unveiled as an ambassador to coincide with the Oceania National Olympic Committees' general assembly. May 2009 saw the IRB announce that they would drop the Rugby World Cup Sevens in order to improve the chances of the sport being included: the benefit of this move would be to make the Olympics the premier event in international rugby sevens.

As well as rugby sevens, baseball and softball (which were dropped from the Olympic programme in 2005), karate, squash, golf and roller sports (inline speed skating) were all seeking to be included in the 2016 Games and leaders of the seven sports made formal presentations to the IOC executive board in June 2009. A new system was in place from this session, in which a sport now needs only a simple majority for inclusion, rather than the previous two-thirds majority.

On 13 August 2009, it was announced that the IOC executive board was recommending rugby sevens for inclusion in the 2016 Olympic Games and on 9 October 2009 the full IOC, at its 121st IOC Session in Copenhagen, voted to include rugby sevens in the 2016 games.

Separate competitions for men and women will be held, using a similar format to the existing IRB Sevens World Series.

The IRB had originally proposed including 12 teams of each sex, the same number as other team ball sports events. During the IRB's presentation at the IOC Session, two IOC members asked why only 12 teams were included: IRB Chief Executive Mike Miller responded "We followed the guidance of the Executive Members of the IOC, but if the IOC feels we should have more teams, we will add more."

== Qualifying ==
Twelve rugby teams participate in the men's and women's competitions, qualifying through one of the four following routes:

- The host country automatically qualifies.
- Four teams qualify by finishing in the top four in the World Rugby Sevens Series.
- Six teams qualify by finishing first in their respective continental championships: Europe, Africa, Oceania, Asia, South America, and North America.
- The last qualifying place goes to the team that wins an inter-continental competition.

== Competition format ==
Both the men's and women's competition consist of two parts: pool play followed by a knockout round.

For pool play, the twelve teams are divided into three pools of four teams each. Each team plays the other three teams in the pool once.

At the end of pool play, the eight best teams—the top two from each group plus the two best third-place finishers—qualify for the quarterfinals, while the other four teams move to the semi-finals of a consolation bracket.

The knockout rounds proceed through the quarterfinals, semifinals, and the final. The losers of the quarter-finals move to the semi-finals of a second consolation bracket, while the winners proceed to the medal semi-finals.

The winner of the final wins the gold medal, and the defeated finalist wins silver, while the two defeated semifinalists play a third-place playoff to determine who wins the bronze medal.

== History ==
=== 2016 ===
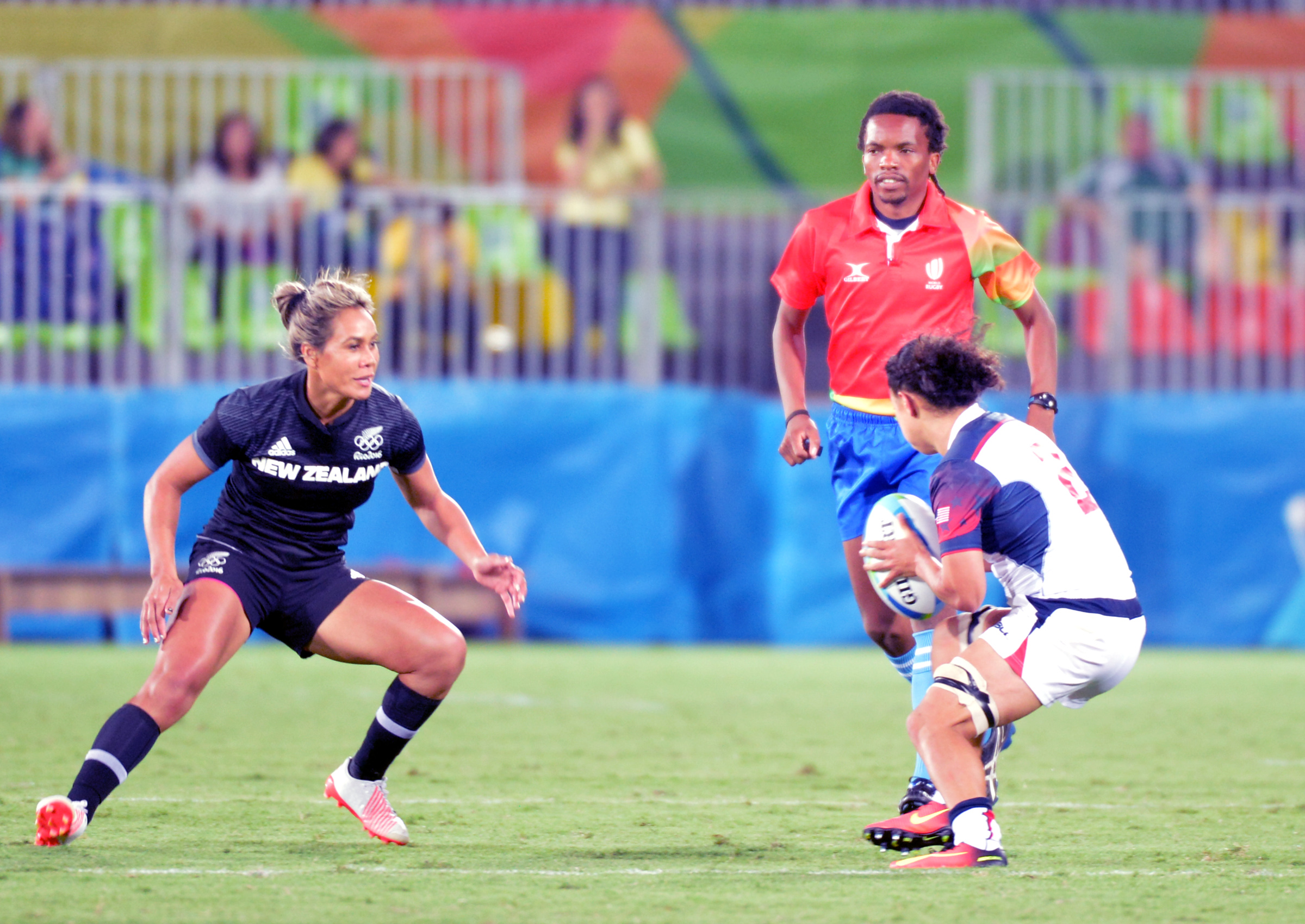
Huriana Manuel (left) of New Zealand and Kelly Griffin (right) of United States.

Though rugby had not been featured in the Olympics since the 1924 Summer Olympics in any form, the IOC chose to introduce the seven-a-side version of the sport to the games. The seven-a-side version, completed over two or three days, involving squads of no more than 12 players and consisting of multiple 14 minute matches in one stadium was seen as particularly suitable format for multi-sport events. The sport featured for this Olympics and the following 2020 Summer Olympics. The sport was retained thereafter for 2024 in Paris and 2028 in Los Angeles, and is expected to be included in 2032 in Australia, a major rugby sevens nation.

The 2016 rugby competition took place in a temporary arena at Deodoro Stadium. The original plan was to stage the rugby matches at the São Januário Stadium. However this was scrapped because the club in charge of the venue missed the deadline to present its project. The Organising Committee considered Estádio Olímpico João Havelange, which would have had to have been shared with the athletics competitions. It was later announced that the rugby competition will take place in a temporary arena at Deodoro Stadium, shared with the modern pentathlon. In April 2016 concerns were raised by the World Rugby head of competitions and performance, Mark Egan, about progress of construction at the temporary 15,000-seater stadium.

The competition ran from the August 6–11, taking a maximum six days. In the Men's tournament, pool A consisted of Fiji, Argentina, USA and Brazil. Pool B included South Africa, Australia, France and Spain while pool C consisted of New Zealand, Great Britain, Kenya and Japan. In the Women's tournament pool A consisted of Australia, USA, Fiji and Colombia. Pool B included New Zealand, France, Spain and Kenya while pool C consisted of Canada, Great Britain, Brazil and Japan.

The women's saw Australia beating New Zealand 24–17 in the first final of women's rugby union at the Olympic Games. New Zealand took the early lead but Australia fought back and looked the most dangerous team throughout. The New Zealand defence was brutal early. Australia had the ball for the first two minutes but there was just no way through. New Zealand eventually found a way through after five minutes through Kayla McAlister. Australia almost struck back two minutes later but brutal one-on-one New Zealand defence prevented the try. Finally Australia scored in the corner. The ball looked to be grassed early and then bobble over the line without Australian player Emma Tonegato being in control. But the five points went onto the scoreboard. They went on and scored again right on halftime through Evania Pelite. Australia made an awful start to the second half, kicking the ball out on the full. But they soon recovered with tries to Ellia Green and Charlotte Caslick.

In the men's tournament, Fiji secured their first Olympic medal with emphatic 43–7 win over Great Britain, as South Africa won bronze with big win over Japan. Having never previously won an Olympic medal of any colour, Fiji won gold at the Deodoro Stadium by demolishing Britain in the final. The opening minute saw Osea Kolinisau left one and one with Tom Mitchell and although his fellow captain halted his progress, Kolinisau was still able to stretch and touch the ball down behind his head. Almost straight away, Fiji had a second try. Samisoni Viriviri muscled his way past two players before offloading to Jerry Tuwai to score under the posts. After that Britain were shell shocked and Fiji racked up a further five tries.

The introduction of rugby sevens, its traditional festival atmosphere and the victory of Fiji for their first ever Olympic medal, was seen as a significant success story of the Games, notwithstanding that rugby union was not considered a major sport in Brazil.

== Men's tournaments ==
=== Summary ===
| Year | Host | Final | | | Bronze medal match | | |
| Year | Host | Gold medal | Score | Silver medal | Bronze medal | Score | Fourth place |
|---|---|---|---|---|---|---|---|
| 2016 | (Brazil); Rio de Janeiro | Fiji | 43–7 | Great Britain | South Africa | 54–14 | Japan |
| 2020 | (Japan); Tokyo | Fiji | 27–12 | New Zealand | Argentina | 17–12 | Great Britain |
| 2024 | (France); Paris | France | 28–7 | Fiji | South Africa | 26–19 | Australia |
| 2028 | (United States); Los Angeles | | | | | | |

=== Medal table ===
| Rank | Nation | Gold | Silver | Bronze | Total |
|---|---|---|---|---|---|
| 1 | Fiji | 2 | 1 | 0 | 3 |
| 2 | France | 1 | 0 | 0 | 1 |
| 3 | Great Britain | 0 | 1 | 0 | 1 |
| 3 | New Zealand | 0 | 1 | 0 | 1 |
| 5 | South Africa | 0 | 0 | 2 | 2 |
| 6 | Argentina | 0 | 0 | 1 | 1 |
| Totals (6 entries) | | 3 | 3 | 3 | 9 |

=== Participating nations ===
Legend

- 1st – Champions
- 2nd – Runners-up
- 3rd – Third place
- 4th – Fourth place
- • – Did not enter / Did not qualify / Banned
- – Hosts
- Q – Qualified for forthcoming tournament

| Nation | (Brazil) 2016 | (Japan) 2020 | (France) 2024 | (United States) 2028 | Years |
|---|---|---|---|---|---|
| Argentina | 6th | 3rd | 7th | | 3 |
| Australia | 8th | 7th | 4th | | 3 |
| Brazil | 12th | • | • | | 1 |
| Canada | • | 8th | • | | 1 |
| Fiji | 1st | 1st | 2nd | | 3 |
| France | 7th | • | 1st | | 2 |
| Great Britain | 2nd | 4th | • | | 2 |
| Ireland | • | 10th | 6th | | 2 |
| Japan | 4th | 11th | 12th | | 3 |
| Kenya | 11th | 9th | 9th | | 3 |
| New Zealand | 5th | 2nd | 5th | | 3 |
| Samoa | • | • | 10th | | 1 |
| South Africa | 3rd | 5th | 3rd | | 3 |
| South Korea | • | 12th | • | | 1 |
| Spain | 10th | • | • | | 1 |
| United States | 9th | 6th | 8th | Q | 4 |
| Uruguay | • | • | 11th | | 1 |
| Total | 12 | 12 | 12 | 12 | |

== Women's tournaments ==
=== Summary ===
| Year | Host | Final | | | Bronze medal match | | |
| Year | Host | Gold medal | Score | Silver medal | Bronze medal | Score | Fourth place |
|---|---|---|---|---|---|---|---|
| 2016 | (Brazil); Rio de Janeiro | Australia | 24–17 | New Zealand | Canada | 33–10 | Great Britain |
| 2020 | (Japan); Tokyo | New Zealand | 26–12 | France | Fiji | 21–12 | Great Britain |
| 2024 | (France); Paris | New Zealand | 19–12 | Canada | United States | 14–12 | Australia |
| 2028 | (United States); Los Angeles | | | | | | |

=== Medal table ===
| Rank | Nation | Gold | Silver | Bronze | Total |
|---|---|---|---|---|---|
| 1 | New Zealand | 2 | 1 | 0 | 3 |
| 2 | Australia | 1 | 0 | 0 | 1 |
| 3 | Canada | 0 | 1 | 1 | 2 |
| 4 | France | 0 | 1 | 0 | 1 |
| 5 | Fiji | 0 | 0 | 1 | 1 |
| 5 | United States | 0 | 0 | 1 | 1 |
| Totals (6 entries) | | 3 | 3 | 3 | 9 |

=== Participating nations ===
Legend

- 1st – Champions
- 2nd – Runners-up
- 3rd – Third place
- 4th – Fourth place
- • – Did not enter / Did not qualify / Banned
- – Hosts
- Q – Qualified for forthcoming tournament

| Nation | (Brazil) 2016 | (Japan) 2020 | (France) 2024 | (United States) 2028 | Years |
|---|---|---|---|---|---|
| Australia | 1st | 5th | 4th | | 3 |
| Brazil | 9th | 11th | 10th | | 3 |
| Canada | 3rd | 9th | 2nd | | 3 |
| China | • | 7th | 6th | | 2 |
| Colombia | 12th | • | • | | 1 |
| Fiji | 8th | 3rd | 12th | | 3 |
| France | 6th | 2nd | 5th | | 3 |
| Great Britain | 4th | 4th | 7th | | 3 |
| Ireland | • | • | 8th | | 1 |
| Japan | 10th | 12th | 9th | | 3 |
| Kenya | 11th | 10th | • | | 2 |
| New Zealand | 2nd | 1st | 1st | | 3 |
| Russia | • | 8th | • | | 1 (Note: Russia's total includes one appearance as Russian Olympic Committee in 2020.) |
| South Africa | • | • | 11th | | 1 |
| Spain | 7th | • | • | | 1 |
| United States | 5th | 6th | 3rd | Q | 4 |
| Total | 12 | 12 | 12 | 12 | |

== Overall medal table ==
Accurate as of the conclusion of the 2024 Olympics.

| Rank | Nation | Gold | Silver | Bronze | Total |
|---|---|---|---|---|---|
| 1 | New Zealand | 2 | 2 | 0 | 4 |
| 2 | Fiji | 2 | 1 | 1 | 4 |
| 3 | France | 1 | 1 | 0 | 2 |
| 4 | Australia | 1 | 0 | 0 | 1 |
| 5 | Canada | 0 | 1 | 1 | 2 |
| 6 | Great Britain | 0 | 1 | 0 | 1 |
| 7 | South Africa | 0 | 0 | 2 | 2 |
| 8 | Argentina | 0 | 0 | 1 | 1 |
| 8 | United States | 0 | 0 | 1 | 1 |
| Totals (9 entries) | | 6 | 6 | 6 | 18 |

== See also ==
- Rugby union at the Summer Olympics (15-a-side rugby union, held 1900–1924)
- Wheelchair rugby at the Summer Paralympics
