= Rugby sevens at the Pan American Games =

- No. of events: 2 (men: 1; women: 1)

Rugby sevens at the Pan American Games was held for the first time at the 2011 Pan American Games. On July 11, 2007, the Pan American Sports Organization (PASO), announced that rugby sevens would be added to the list of sports that will be played at future Pan American Games, after a vote by the organization's general assembly. Women's rugby sevens was later added to the program for the Toronto 2015 Games.

== Men's medal table ==
Rank	Nation	Gold	Silver	Bronze	Total
1	Argentina	2	2	0	4
2	Canada	2	1	1	4
3	Chile	0	1	0	1
4	United States	0	0	3	3
Totals (4 entries)		4	4	4	12

== Men's tournament ==
Year	Host	Gold medal game			Bronze medal game
Year	Host	Gold medalist	Score	Silver medalist	Bronze medalist	Score	Fourth place
2011	(Mexico) Guadalajara	Canada	26 – 24	Argentina	United States	21 – 17	Uruguay
2015	(Canada) Toronto	Canada	22 – 19	Argentina	United States	40 – 12	Uruguay
2019	(Peru) Lima	Argentina	33 – 10	Canada	United States	24 – 19 (a.e.t.)	Brazil
2023	(Chile) Santiago	Argentina	24 – 5	Chile	Canada	19 – 17	United States

=== Participating nations ===
Nation	2011	2015	2019	2023	Years
Argentina	2nd place, silver medalist(s)	2nd place, silver medalist(s)	1st place, gold medalist(s)	1st place, gold medalist(s)	4
Brazil	7	6	4	6	4
Canada	1st place, gold medalist(s)	1st place, gold medalist(s)	2nd place, silver medalist(s)	3rd place, bronze medalist(s)	4
Chile	5	5	5	2nd place, silver medalist(s)	4
Guyana	8	7	8		3
Jamaica			6	7	2
Mexico	6	8		8	3
United States	3rd place, bronze medalist(s)	3rd place, bronze medalist(s)	3rd place, bronze medalist(s)	4	4
Uruguay	4	4	7	5	4
Nations	8	8	8	8	9

== Women's medal table ==
Rank	Nation	Gold	Silver	Bronze	Total
1	Canada	2	1	0	3
2	United States	1	2	0	3
3	Brazil	0	0	2	2
4	Colombia	0	0	1	1
Totals (4 entries)		3	3	3	9

== Women's tournament ==
Year	Host	Gold medal game			Bronze medal game
Year	Host	Gold medalist	Score	Silver medalist	Bronze medalist	Score	Fourth place
2015	(Canada) Toronto	Canada	55 – 7	United States	Brazil	29 – 0	Argentina
2019	(Peru) Lima	Canada	24 – 10	United States	Colombia	29 – 24 (a.e.t.)	Brazil
2023	(Chile) Santiago	United States	19 – 12	Canada	Brazil	45 – 0	Colombia

=== Participating nations ===
Nation	2015	2019	2023	Years
Argentina	4	5		2
Brazil	3rd place, bronze medalist(s)	4	3rd place, bronze medalist(s)	3
Canada	1st place, gold medalist(s)	1st place, gold medalist(s)	2nd place, silver medalist(s)	3
Chile			7	1
Colombia	6	3rd place, bronze medalist(s)	4	3
Jamaica			8	1
Mexico	5	7	6	3
Paraguay			5	1
Peru		6		1
Trinidad and Tobago		8		1
United States	2nd place, silver medalist(s)	2nd place, silver medalist(s)	1st place, gold medalist(s)	3
Nations	6	8	8	11

== Combined medal table ==
Rank	Nation	Gold	Silver	Bronze	Total
1	Canada	4	2	1	7
2	Argentina	2	2	0	4
3	United States	1	2	3	6
4	Chile	0	1	0	1
5	Brazil	0	0	2	2
6	Colombia	0	0	1	1
Totals (6 entries)		7	7	7	21

== Venues ==
Games	Venue	Other sports hosted at this venue at these games	Capacity	Ref.
2011 Guadalajara	Tlaquepaque Stadium	—N/a	1,156	
2015 Toronto	Exhibition Stadium	—N/a	22,000	
2019 Lima	Rugby field	Archery	2,500	
2023 Santiago	Municipal Stadium (La Pintana)	—N/a	5,000	
