= 2017 France Women's Sevens =

- Women's Sevens Series V
- Host nation: France
- Date: 24 – 25 June 2017

Tournament details
- Matches played: 34

The 2017 France Sevens was the fourth tournament within the 2016–17 World Rugby Women's Sevens Series. It was held over the weekend of 24–25 June 2017 at Stade Gabriel Montpied in Clermont-Ferrand.

== Format ==
The teams are drawn into three pools of four teams each. Each team plays every other team in their pool once. The top two teams from each pool advance to the Cup/Plate brackets while the top 2 third place teams also compete in the Cup/Plate. The other teams from each group play-off for the Challenge Trophy.

== Teams ==
- Australia
- Brazil
- Canada
- England
- Fiji
- France
- Ireland
- Japan
- New Zealand
- Russia
- Spain
- United States

== Pool stage ==
Key to colours in group tables
| Teams that advanced to the Cup Quarterfinal |

=== Pool A ===
| Team | Pld | W | D | L | PF | PA | PD | Pts |
|---|---|---|---|---|---|---|---|---|
| New Zealand | 3 | 3 | 0 | 0 | 66 | 29 | +37 | 9 |
| United States | 3 | 2 | 0 | 1 | 59 | 31 | +28 | 7 |
| Ireland | 3 | 1 | 0 | 2 | 38 | 43 | –5 | 5 |
| Japan | 3 | 0 | 0 | 3 | 20 | 80 | –60 | 3 |

24 June 2017
12:00

| United States | 12 – 7 | Ireland |

Stade Gabriel Montpied, Clermont-Ferrand

24 June 2017
12:22

| New Zealand | 21 – 10 | Japan |

Stade Gabriel Montpied, Clermont-Ferrand

24 June 2017
14:44

| United States | 33 – 5 | Japan |

Stade Gabriel Montpied, Clermont-Ferrand

24 June 2017
15:06

| New Zealand | 26 – 5 | Ireland |

Stade Gabriel Montpied, Clermont-Ferrand

24 June 2017
17:28

| Ireland | 26 – 5 | Japan |

Stade Gabriel Montpied, Clermont-Ferrand

24 June 2017
17:50

| New Zealand | 19 – 14 | United States |

Stade Gabriel Montpied, Clermont-Ferrand

=== Pool B ===
| Team | Pld | W | D | L | PF | PA | PD | Pts |
|---|---|---|---|---|---|---|---|---|
| Canada | 3 | 3 | 0 | 0 | 98 | 14 | +84 | 9 |
| Russia | 3 | 1 | 0 | 2 | 48 | 36 | +12 | 5 |
| Brazil | 3 | 1 | 0 | 2 | 36 | 67 | –31 | 5 |
| England | 3 | 1 | 0 | 2 | 31 | 96 | –65 | 5 |

24 June 2017
12:44

| Russia | 27 – 0 | England |

Stade Gabriel Montpied, Clermont-Ferrand

24 June 2017
13:06

| Canada | 29 – 0 | Brazil |

Stade Gabriel Montpied, Clermont-Ferrand

24 June 2017
14:42

| Russia | 7 – 12 | Brazil |

Stade Gabriel Montpied, Clermont-Ferrand

24 June 2017
15:04

| Canada | 45 – 0 | England |

Stade Gabriel Montpied, Clermont-Ferrand

24 June 2017
18:12

| England | 31 – 24 | Brazil |

Stade Gabriel Montpied, Clermont-Ferrand

24 June 2017
18:34

| Canada | 24 – 14 | Russia |

Stade Gabriel Montpied, Clermont-Ferrand

=== Pool C ===
| Team | Pld | W | D | L | PF | PA | PD | Pts |
|---|---|---|---|---|---|---|---|---|
| Australia | 3 | 3 | 0 | 0 | 96 | 22 | +74 | 9 |
| France | 3 | 2 | 0 | 1 | 60 | 41 | +19 | 7 |
| Fiji | 3 | 1 | 0 | 2 | 64 | 73 | –9 | 5 |
| Spain | 3 | 0 | 0 | 3 | 14 | 98 | –84 | 3 |

24 June 2017
13:28

| Australia | 41 – 0 | Spain |

Stade Gabriel Montpied, Clermont-Ferrand

24 June 2017
13:50

| France | 31 – 14 | Fiji |

Stade Gabriel Montpied, Clermont-Ferrand

24 June 2017
13:58

| Australia | 35 – 5 | Fiji |

Stade Gabriel Montpied, Clermont-Ferrand

24 June 2017
14:20

| France | 12 – 7 | Spain |

Stade Gabriel Montpied, Clermont-Ferrand

24 June 2017
18:56

| Fiji | 45 – 7 | Spain |

Stade Gabriel Montpied, Clermont-Ferrand

24 June 2017
19:18

| France | 17 – 20 | Australia |

Stade Gabriel Montpied, Clermont-Ferrand

== Knockout stage ==
=== Challenge Trophy ===
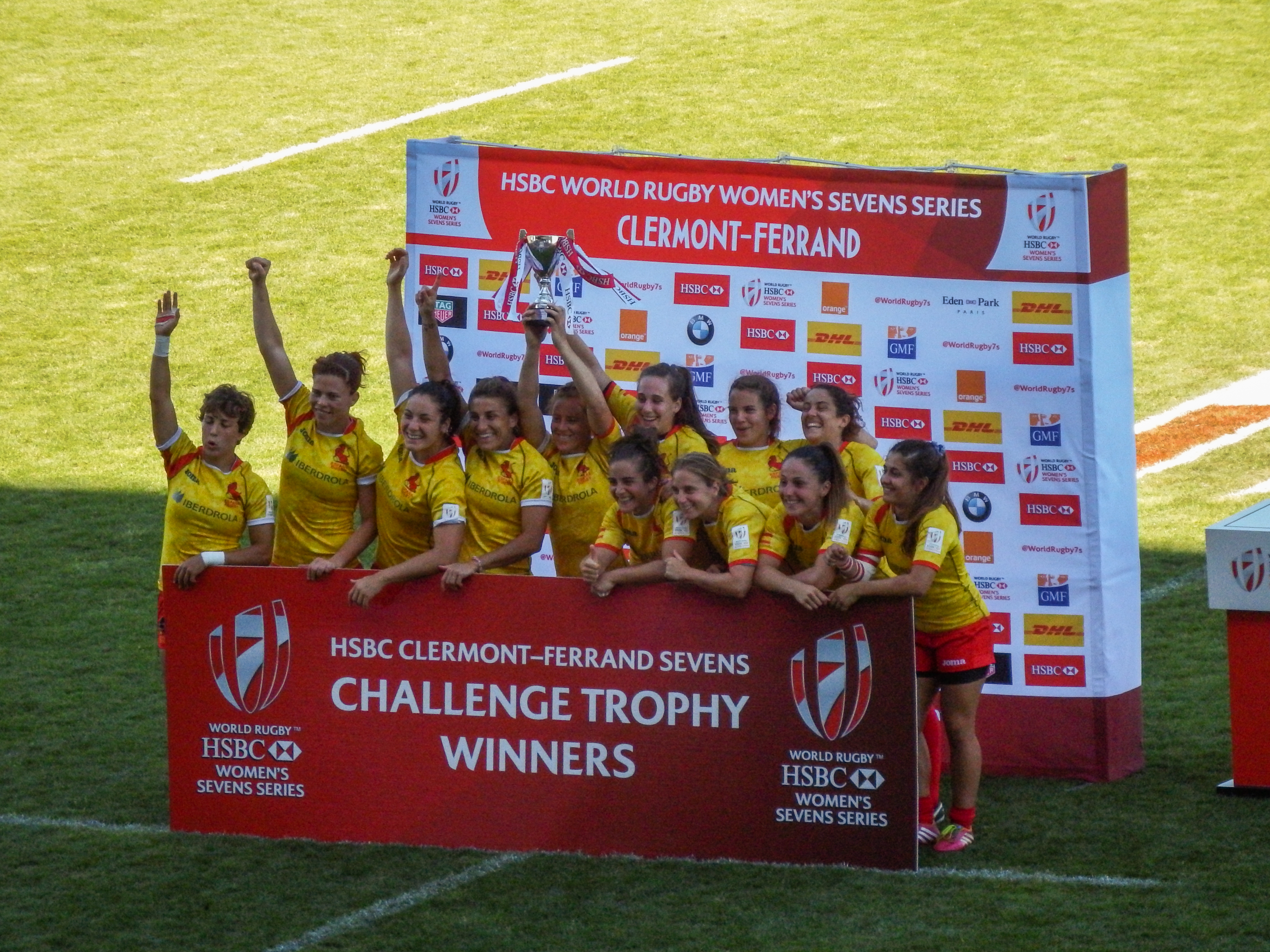
Challenge Trophy : Spain.

Semi-finals
25 June 2017 – 13:28 – Clermont-Ferrand
Brazil | 5
Spain | 12
25 June 2017 – 13:50 – Clermont-Ferrand
England | 7
Japan | 25

Challenge Trophy Final
25 June 2017 – 16:56 – Clermont-Ferrand
Spain | 15
Japan | 14
11th Place
25 June 2017 – 16:34 – Clermont-Ferrand
Brazil | 27
England | 17

=== 5th Place ===
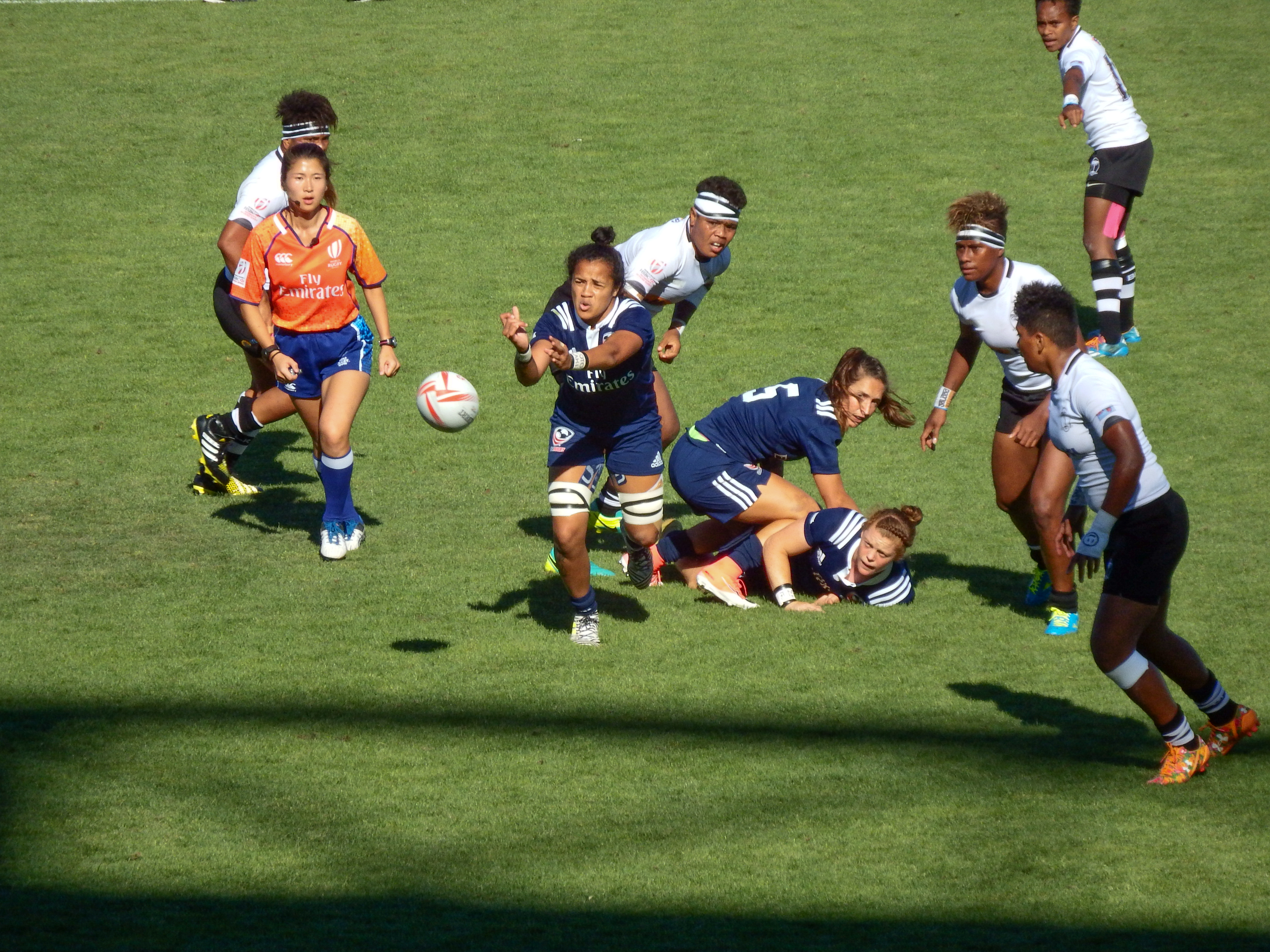
5th place match : United States-Fiji.

Semi-finals
25 June 2017 – 15:06 – Clermont-Ferrand
Ireland | 14
United States | 31
25 June 2017 – 15:28 – Clermont-Ferrand
Russia | 7
Fiji | 24

5th Place Final
25 June 2017 – 18:12 – Clermont-Ferrand
United States | 19
Fiji | 24
7th Place
25 June 2017 – 17:50 – Clermont-Ferrand
Ireland | 14
Russia | 19

=== Cup ===
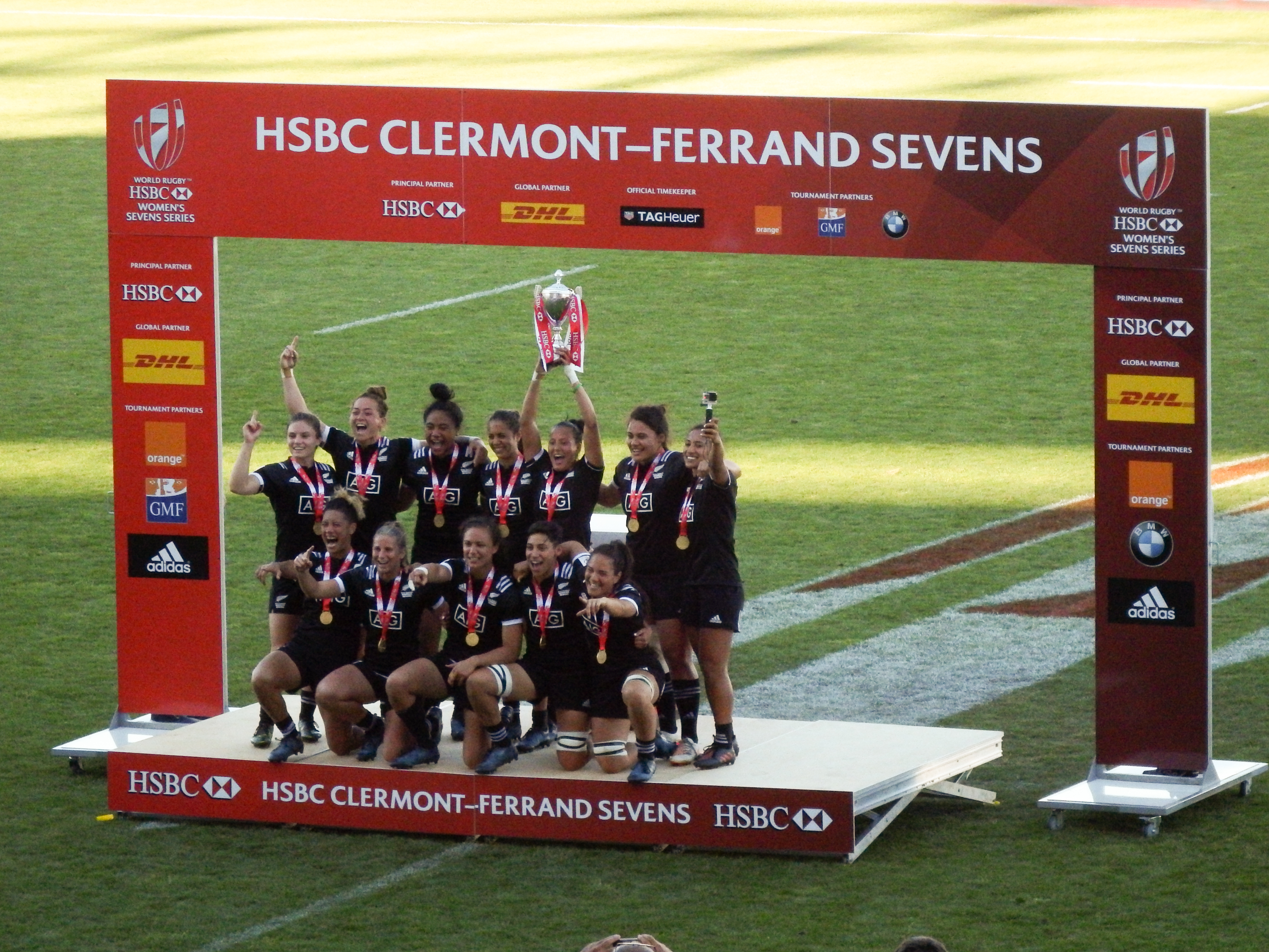
Cup : New Zealand.

Quarter-finals
25 June 2017 – 12:00 – Clermont-Ferrand
Canada | 31
Ireland | 0
25 June 2017 – 12:22 – Clermont-Ferrand
Australia | 31
United States | 14
25 June 2017 – 12:44 – Clermont-Ferrand
Russia | 7
France | 10
25 June 2017 – 13:06 – Clermont-Ferrand
New Zealand | 31
Fiji | 7

Semi-finals
25 June 2017 – 15:50 – Clermont-Ferrand
Canada | 14
Australia | 19
25 June 2017 – 16:12 – Clermont-Ferrand
France | 7
New Zealand | 21

Cup Final
25 June 2017 – 18:56 – Clermont-Ferrand
Australia | 7
New Zealand | 22
Bronze Medal Match
25 June 2017 – 18:34 – Clermont-Ferrand
Canada | 36
France | 7

== Tournament placings ==
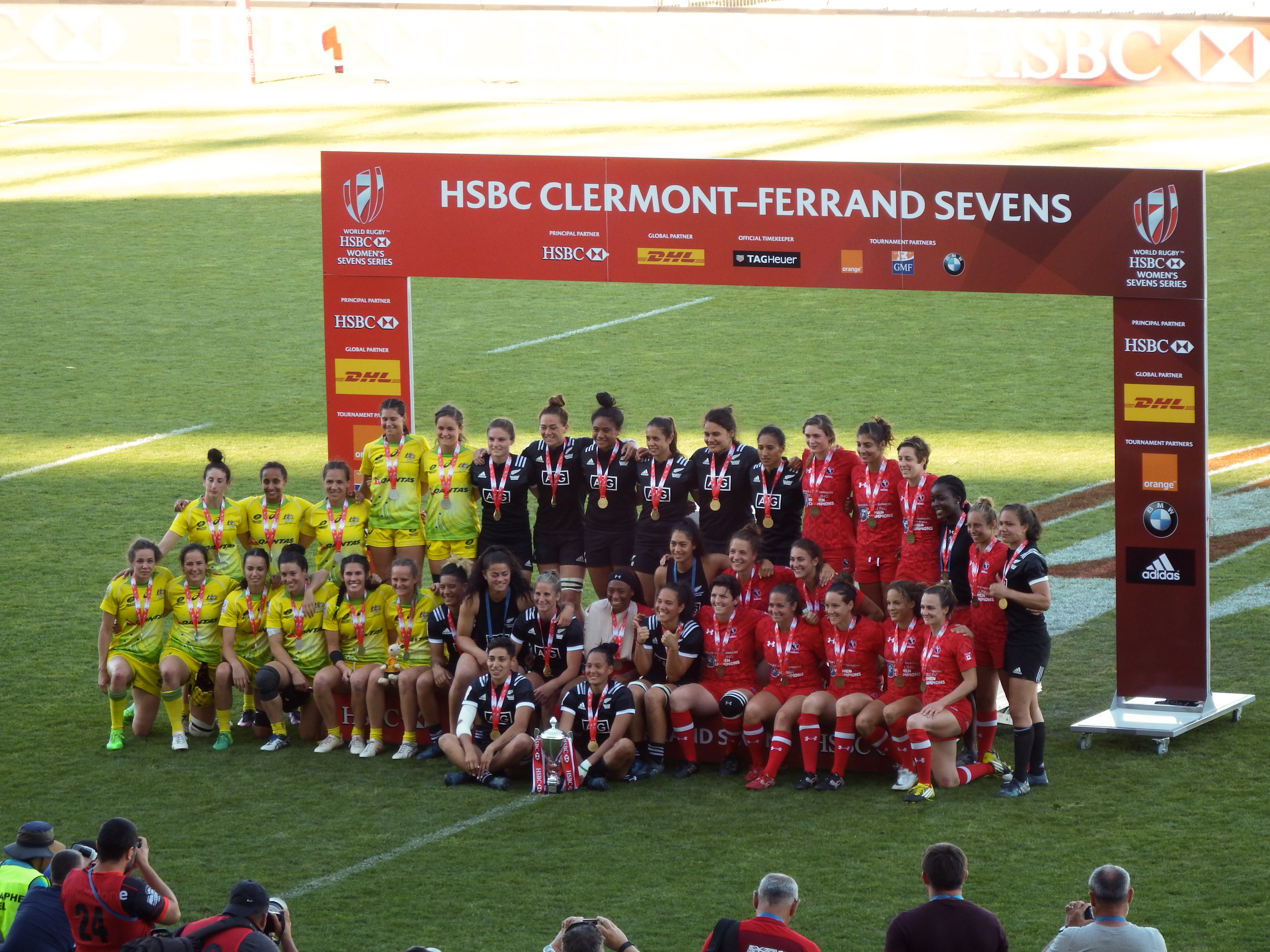
Tournament podium : New Zealand, Australia, Canada.

| Place | Team | Points |
|---|---|---|
| 1st place, gold medalist(s) | New Zealand | 20 |
| 2nd place, silver medalist(s) | Australia | 18 |
| 3rd place, bronze medalist(s) | Canada | 16 |
| 4 | France | 14 |
| 5 | Fiji | 12 |
| 6 | United States | 10 |

| Place | Team | Points |
|---|---|---|
| 7 | Russia | 8 |
| 8 | Ireland | 6 |
| 9 | Spain | 4 |
| 10 | Japan | 3 |
| 11 | Brazil | 2 |
| 12 | England | 1 |

== See also ==
- World Rugby Women's Sevens Series
- 2016–17 World Rugby Women's Sevens Series
- World Rugby
