= 2017 Sydney Women's Sevens =

- Women's Sevens Series V
- Host nation: Australia
- Date: 3–4 February 2017

Cup
- Champion: Canada
- Runner-up: United States
- Third: New Zealand

Challenge
- Winner: Brazil

Tournament details
- Most points: (Papua New Guinea) Joana Lagona (49 points)
- Most tries: (Papua New Guinea) Joana Lagona (9 tries)

The 2017 Sydney Women's Sevens was the second tournament of the 2016–17 World Rugby Women's Sevens Series. It was the inaugural edition of the Australian Women's Sevens and part of the World Rugby Women's Sevens Series.

The tournament was played on 3–4 February 2017 at Allianz Stadium and Kippax Field in Sydney, and won by Canada 21–17 over the United States in the final.

== Format ==
The teams were drawn into three pools of four teams each. Each team played every other team in their pool once. The top two teams from each pool advanced to the Cup brackets, together with the two best third-placed teams. The other teams from each group played off for the Challenge Trophy.

== Teams ==
The participating teams were:

- Australia
- Canada
- England
- Fiji
- France
- Ireland
- New Zealand
- Russia
- Spain
- United States
- Brazil
- Papua New Guinea

== Pool stage ==
Key to colours in group tables
Teams that advanced to the Cup Quarterfinal

=== Pool A ===
Team	Pld	W	D	L	PF	PA	PD	Pts
New Zealand	3	3	0	0	79	27	+52	9
Canada	3	2	0	1	75	41	+34	7
France	3	1	0	2	48	50	–2	5
Papua New Guinea	3	0	0	3	20	104	–84	3

3 February 2017
13:58

Canada	26–5	France

Allianz Stadium, Sydney

3 February 2017
14:20

New Zealand	34–5	Papua New Guinea

Allianz Stadium, Sydney

3 February 2017
16:40

Canada	39–5	Papua New Guinea

Allianz Stadium, Sydney

3 February 2017
17:02

New Zealand	14–12	France

Allianz Stadium, Sydney

3 February 2017
19:22

France	31–10	Papua New Guinea

Allianz Stadium, Sydney

3 February 2017
19:44

New Zealand	31–10	Canada

Allianz Stadium, Sydney

=== Pool B ===
Team	Pld	W	D	L	PF	PA	PD	Pts
Australia	3	3	0	0	79	24	+55	9
Ireland	3	2	0	1	52	46	+6	7
Fiji	3	1	0	2	60	55	+5	5
Brazil	3	0	0	3	22	88	–66	3

3 February 2017
13:14

Fiji	12–19	Ireland

Allianz Stadium, Sydney

3 February 2017
13:36

Australia	24–7	Brazil

Allianz Stadium, Sydney

3 February 2017
15:56

Fiji	31–10	Brazil

Allianz Stadium, Sydney

3 February 2017
16:18

Australia	29–0	Ireland

Allianz Stadium, Sydney

3 February 2017
18:38

Ireland	33–5	Brazil

Allianz Stadium, Sydney

3 February 2017
19:00

Australia	26–17	Fiji

Allianz Stadium, Sydney

=== Pool C ===
Team	Pld	W	D	L	PF	PA	PD	Pts
Russia	3	3	0	0	74	20	+54	9
United States	3	2	0	1	52	38	+14	7
England	3	1	0	2	38	63	–25	5
Spain	3	0	0	3	20	63	–43	3

3 February 2017
12:30

England	19–10	Spain

Allianz Stadium, Sydney

3 February 2017
12:52

Russia	19–10	United States

Allianz Stadium, Sydney

3 February 2017
15:12

England	14–22	United States

Allianz Stadium, Sydney

3 February 2017
15:34

Russia	24–5	Spain

Allianz Stadium, Sydney

3 February 2017
17:54

Spain	5–20	United States

Allianz Stadium, Sydney

3 February 2017
18:16

Russia	31–5	England

Allianz Stadium, Sydney

== Knockout stage ==
=== Challenge Trophy ===
Semi-finals
4 February – 10:28 – Kippax Field
England	29
Papua New Guinea	17
4 February – 10:50 Kippax Field
Spain	7
Brazil	10

Challenge Trophy Final
4 February – 13:34 – Kippax Field
England	12
Brazil	17
11th Place
4 February – 13:12 – Kippax Field
Papua New Guinea	17
Spain	31

=== 5th place ===
Semi-finals
4 February – 12:28 – Kippax Field
France	21
Ireland	19
4 December 2017 – 12:50 – Kippax Field
Fiji	33
Russia	19

5th Place Final
4 February – 15:53 – Allianz Stadium
France	12
Fiji	31
7th Place
4 February – 15:31 – Allianz Stadium
Ireland	12
Russia	17

=== Cup ===
Quarter-finals
4 February – 09:00 – Kippax Field
New Zealand	24
France	5
4 February – 09:22 – Kippax Field
Ireland	5
United States	17
4 February – 09:44 – Kippax Field
Australia	17
Fiji	5
4 February – 10:06 – Kippax Field
Russia	5
Canada	26

Semi-finals
4 February – 13:04 – Allianz Stadium
New Zealand	12
United States	19
4 February – 13:26 – Allianz Stadium
Australia	7
Canada	12

Cup Final
4 February – 16:42 – Allianz Stadium
United States	17
Canada	21
Bronze Medal Match
4 February – 16:15 – Allianz Stadium
New Zealand	19
Australia	0

== Tournament placings ==
Place	Team	Points
1st place, gold medalist(s)	Canada	20
2nd place, silver medalist(s)	United States	18
3rd place, bronze medalist(s)	New Zealand	16
4	Australia	14
5	Fiji	12
6	France	10

Place	Team	Points
7	Russia	8
8	Ireland	6
9	Brazil	4
10	England	3
11	Spain	2
12	Papua New Guinea	1

Source: World Rugby (archived)

== See also ==
- World Rugby Women's Sevens Series
- 2016–17 World Rugby Women's Sevens Series
- 2017 Sydney Sevens
