= Sene Naoupu =

Ireland international rugby union player

- Born: Sene Fanene; 2 February 1984 (age 42) Dunedin, New Zealand
- Height: 5 ft 6 in (168 cm)
- Weight: 71 kg (157 lb)
- University: University of Otago
- Notable relative: Julianna Naoupu (sister-in-law)

Rugby union career
- Position: Centre/Fly-half
Youth career
- -: North Otago
- –: Hawke's Bay
Senior career
Years	Team	Apps	(Points)
2008–2009	Whitestone 45ers		
2011–2016	Galwegians		
2016–2017	Aylesford Bulls Ladies		
2016–2017	Harlequins Ladies		
2017–2024	Old Belvedere		
–	Otago Spirit		
–	Connacht		
2017–2023	Leinster		
International career
Years	Team	Apps	(Points)
2015–2022	Ireland	48	
National sevens team
Years	Team		Comps
2015–2017	Ireland 7s		

Sene Naoupu (née: Fanene) is former Ireland women's rugby union international. Naoupu was a member of the Ireland team that won the 2015 Women's Six Nations Championship. She also represented Ireland at the 2017 Women's Rugby World Cup. She is also an Ireland women's rugby sevens international. Naoupu is a Samoan New Zealander who originally emigrated to Ireland in 2009 with her former husband, George Naoupu, the former Highlanders, Harlequins and Connacht rugby union player. Naoupu is also a lifestyle coach and fitness trainer and operates her own business, Senshaper. In 2016, Naoupu was listed by The Irish Times as one of the thirty most influential women in Ireland. She retired from International rugby in 2022.

== Early life ==
Naoupu was born into a Samoan New Zealander family and raised in Oamaru by her single mother, Toeafiafi Taiti. She started playing sport from a very young age in her back yard with her brother and cousins. By the age of five or six, she was playing cricket, softball and touch rugby.

== Playing career ==
=== Early years ===
Naoupu started playing women's rugby union at 13 and in her youth played for North Otago and Hawke's Bay. She attended the University of Otago on a basketball scholarship before switching sports and concentrating on rugby union. In September 2003 she was included in a New Zealand women's national rugby union team training squad along with Farah Palmer and Anna Richards. She attended further trials for the Black Ferns but failed to make the team. After developing an eating disorder and depression, she took a break from playing rugby union. She was also diagnosed with anorexia by her university doctor. In 2008 she made a comeback, playing club rugby union with Whitestone 45ers.

=== Clubs ===
In 2008, while working as a co-host on a sports radio show in Auckland, Sene met George Naoupu, who at the time was playing for the Highlanders. In 2011 they were married in Christchurch. Her subsequent playing career has mirrored that of her husband's. Sene and George Naoupu first moved to Ireland in 2009 when the latter began playing for Connacht. They then spent a year in Japan where George played for the Kobelco Steelers and Sene coached rugby union to children. In 2011 they returned to Ireland when George rejoined Connacht. Sene subsequently played for Galwegians where her coaches included George. In 2016 when George joined Harlequins, Sene played for Aylesford Bulls Ladies and then Harlequins Ladies. In July 2017 George retired as a professional rugby union player and took up a player/coaching role with Wicklow. At the same time, Sene began playing for Old Belvedere.

=== Provincial level ===
In New Zealand when she was at the University of Otago, Naoupu played for Otago Spirit in the Women's Provincial Championship. Her sister, Sini Fanene, also played for Otago Spirit. In Ireland, Naoupu has represented both Connacht and Leinster in the IRFU Women's Interprovincial Series. She made her debut for Leinster on 3 December 2017 against Ulster.

=== Ireland international ===
Having lived in Ireland since 2009, Naoupu became eligible to represent the Ireland women's national rugby union team. On 6 February 2015 she made her debut for Ireland in the 2015 Women's Six Nations Championship against Italy. On 27 November 2016 when she made her 14th appearance for Ireland against New Zealand, Naoupu was asked by head coach, Tom Tierney, to present the Ireland jerseys to her teammates. She also represented Ireland at the 2017 Women's Rugby World Cup.

Naoupu has also played for the Ireland women's national rugby sevens team in the World Rugby Women's Sevens Series. In February 2017 Naoupu, together with Alison Miller and Hannah Tyrrell, was controversially withdrawn from Ireland's 2017 Women's Six Nations Championship squad in order to represent the Ireland Sevens in the 2017 USA Women's Sevens. This was because Ireland's Sevens were chasing a top eight finish in the 2016–17 World Rugby Women's Sevens Series in order to qualify for the 2018 Rugby World Cup Sevens. In April 2017 Naoupu scored three tries as she helped Ireland win the Challenge Trophy at the 2017 Japan Women's Sevens.

Naoupu has lined out for Ireland in the 2018, 2019, 2020 and 2021 Women's Six Nations and has scored 30 points.

She had a serious health scare in early 2020. A routine scan on a neck injury she got in the Six Nations game against England found a tumour. She had surgery to remove it and had to work with a speech therapist to recover her vocal strength.

But the COVID-enforced rescheduling of the second half of the 2020 Women's Six Nations meant she was back in time to start in Ireland's defeat of Italy in October.

In October 2020 Naoupu became a member of World Rugby's Women's Advisory Council.

== Businesswoman ==
Naoupu is a lifestyle coach and fitness trainer. She has a company which partners with national governing bodies to facilitate player pathways and is an outspoken supporter of girls and women in sport. She is a board director for the national charity BodyWhys for those with eating disorders, something she suffered from herself in her '20s.

In 2017 the Irish Times named her among Irelands' 30 Most Influential Women' and, in 2020, the Irish Examiner named her the 10th Most Influential Women in Irish Sport.

== Honours ==
Aylesford Bulls

- Women's Premiership
  - Winners: 2016-17

Ireland

- Women's Six Nations Championship
  - Winners: 2015
- Triple Crown
  - Winners: 2015

Ireland Sevens

- Japan Women's Sevens Challenge Trophy
  - Winners: 2017

Individual

- Rugby Writers of Ireland Women's Player of the Year
  - Winners: 2016
