= 2016 Dubai Women's Sevens =

- Women's Sevens Series V
- Host nation: United Arab Emirates
- Date: 1–2 December 2016

Cup
- Champion: New Zealand
- Runner-up: Australia
- Third: Russia

Challenge
- Winner: Ireland

Tournament details
- Matches played: 34

The 2016 Dubai Women's Sevens was the opening tournament of the 2016–17 World Rugby Women's Sevens Series. It was held on 1–2 December 2016 at The Sevens Stadium in Dubai, and was the 5th edition of the Women's Dubai Sevens as part of the World Rugby Women's Sevens Series. The defending champions Australia started their first game against the invited South Africans. The opening game of the Dubai tournament matched Spain up against England.

Bill Beaumont, the World Rugby Chairman, said: "With the excitement of the Olympic Games still fresh in people's memories, anticipation has never been higher ahead of a new HSBC World Rugby Women's Sevens Series season kicking off".

== Format ==
The teams are drawn into three pools of four teams each. Each team plays every other team in their pool once. The top two teams from each pool advance to the Cup/Plate brackets while the top 2 third place teams also compete in the Cup/Plate. The other teams from each group play-off for the Challenge Trophy.

== Teams ==
The participating teams include:

- Australia
- Canada
- England
- Fiji
- France
- Ireland
- New Zealand
- Russia
- Spain
- United States
- Brazil
- South Africa

== Pool stage ==
Key to colours in group tables
Teams that advanced to the Cup Quarterfinal

=== Pool A ===
Team	Pld	W	D	L	PF	PA	PD	Pts
Australia	3	3	0	0	77	22	+55	9
Russia	3	1	0	2	36	46	–10	5
South Africa	3	1	0	2	45	64	–19	5
United States	3	1	0	2	29	55	–26	5

1 December 2016
13:28

United States	12–10	Russia

The Sevens, Dubai

1 December 2016
13:50

Australia	38–5	South Africa

The Sevens, Dubai

1 December 2016
16:24

United States	7–26	South Africa

The Sevens, Dubai

1 December 2016
16:46

Australia	20–7	Russia

The Sevens, Dubai

1 December 2016
19:21

Russia	19–14	South Africa

The Sevens, Dubai

1 December 2016
19:43

Australia	19–10	United States

The Sevens, Dubai

=== Pool B ===
Team	Pld	W	D	L	PF	PA	PD	Pts
New Zealand	3	3	0	0	77	15	+62	9
Fiji	3	1	1	1	48	50	–2	6
France	3	1	0	2	38	66	–28	5
Ireland	3	0	1	2	36	68	–32	4

1 December 2016
12:44

France	14–21	Fiji

The Sevens, Dubai

1 December 2016
13:06

New Zealand	27–5	Ireland

The Sevens, Dubai

1 December 2016
15:40

France	24–14	Ireland

The Sevens, Dubai

1 December 2016
16:02

New Zealand	19–10	Fiji

The Sevens, Dubai

1 December 2016
18:37

Fiji	17–17	Ireland

The Sevens, Dubai

1 December 2016
18:59

New Zealand	31–0	France

The Sevens, Dubai

=== Pool C ===
Team	Pld	W	D	L	PF	PA	PD	Pts
Canada	3	3	0	0	77	38	+39	9
England	3	2	0	1	71	38	+33	7
Spain	3	1	0	2	35	63	–28	5
Brazil	3	0	0	3	31	75	–44	3

1 December 2016
12:00

England	31–7	Spain

The Sevens, Dubai

1 December 2016
12:22

Canada	26–19	Brazil

The Sevens, Dubai

1 December 2016
14:56

England	28–7	Brazil

The Sevens, Dubai

1 December 2016
15:18

Canada	27–7	Spain

The Sevens, Dubai

1 December 2016
17:53

Spain	21–5	Brazil

The Sevens, Dubai

1 December 2016
18:15

Canada	24–12	England

The Sevens, Dubai

== Knockout stage ==
=== Challenge Trophy ===
Semi-finals
2 December 2016 – 11:52 – Dubai
Spain	22
Brazil	7
2 December 2016 – 12:14 Dubai
United States	5
Ireland	28

Challenge Trophy Final
2 December 2016 – 16:25 – Dubai
Spain	12
Ireland	14
11th Place
4 December 2016 – 15:02 – Dubai
Brazil	17
United States	26

=== 5th place ===
Semi-finals
2 December 2016 – 12:36 – Dubai
South Africa	12
Canada	19
2 December 2016 – 12:58 – Dubai
Fiji	31
France	12

5th Place Final
2 December 2016 – 15:46 – Dubai
Canada	14
Fiji	17
7th Place
2 December 2016 – 15:24 – Dubai
South Africa	5
France	31

=== Cup ===
Quarter-finals
2 December 2016 – 09:00 – Dubai
New Zealand	39
South Africa	0
2 December 2016 – 09:22 – Dubai
Canada	7
Russia	17
2 December 2016 – 09:44 – Dubai
Fiji	17
England	19
2 December 2016 – 10:06 – Dubai
Australia	42
France	0

Semi-finals
2 December 2016 – 13:28 – Dubai
New Zealand	24
Russia	5
2 December 2016 – 13:50 – Dubai
England	10
Australia	31

Cup Final
2 December 2016 – 17:15 – Dubai
New Zealand	17
Australia	5
Bronze Medal Match
2 December 2016 – 16:50 – Dubai
Russia	17
England	14

== Tournament placings ==
Place	Team	Points
1st place, gold medalist(s)	New Zealand	20
2nd place, silver medalist(s)	Australia	18
3rd place, bronze medalist(s)	Russia	16
4	England	14
5	Fiji	12
6	Canada	10

Place	Team	Points
7	France	8
8	South Africa	6
9	Ireland	4
10	Spain	3
11	United States	2
12	Brazil	1

== See also ==
- World Rugby Women's Sevens Series
- 2016–17 World Rugby Women's Sevens Series
- World Rugby
