= 2017 Canada Women's Sevens =

- Women's Sevens Series V
- Host nation: Canada
- Date: 27 – 28 May 2017

Cup
- Champion: New Zealand
- Runner-up: Canada
- Third: Australia

Challenge
- Winner: Fiji

Tournament details
- Matches played: 34

The 2017 Canada Sevens was the fourth tournament within the 2016–17 World Rugby Women's Sevens Series. It was held over the weekend of 27–28 May 2017 at Westhills Stadium in Langford, Victoria, British Columbia.

New Zealand won the tournament and gold medal, defeating hosts Canada by 17–7 in the Cup final. Australia took third place over France by 26–12 in the play-off for bronze, while Fiji won the Challenge Trophy for ninth place.

== Format ==
The teams were drawn into three pools of four teams each. Each team played every other team in their pool once. The top two teams from each pool advanced to the Cup brackets, together with the two best third-placed teams. The other teams from each group played off for the Challenge Trophy.

== Teams ==
- Australia
- Brazil
- Canada
- England
- Fiji
- France
- Ireland
- Netherlands
- New Zealand
- Russia
- Spain
- United States

== Pool stage ==
Key to colours in group tables
Teams that advanced to the Cup Quarterfinal

=== Pool A ===
Team	Pld	W	D	L	PF	PA	PD	Pts
New Zealand	3	3	0	0	67	17	+50	9
United States	3	2	0	1	78	26	+52	7
England	3	1	0	2	52	64	-12	5
Netherlands	3	0	0	3	10	100	-90	3

27 May 2017
10:30

England	19–21	United States

Westhills Stadium, Langford

27 May 2017
10:52

New Zealand	17–10	Netherlands

Westhills Stadium, Langford

27 May 2017
13:14

England	26–0	Netherlands

Westhills Stadium, Langford

27 May 2017
13:36

New Zealand	7–0	United States

Westhills Stadium, Langford

27 May 2017
15:58

United States	57–0	Netherlands

Westhills Stadium, Langford

27 May 2017
16:20

New Zealand	43–7	England

Westhills Stadium, Langford

=== Pool B ===
Team	Pld	W	D	L	PF	PA	PD	Pts
Canada	3	3	0	0	90	15	+75	9
France	3	2	0	1	60	45	+15	7
Russia	3	1	0	2	37	53	-16	5
Brazil	3	0	0	3	15	89	-74	3

27 May 2017
11:58

Russia	7–24	France

Westhills Stadium, Langford

27 May 2017
12:20

Canada	33–5	Brazil

Westhills Stadium, Langford

27 May 2017
14:42

Russia	20–5	Brazil

Westhills Stadium, Langford

27 May 2017
15:04

Canada	33–0	France

Westhills Stadium, Langford

27 May 2017
17:26

France	36–5	Brazil

Westhills Stadium, Langford

27 May 2017
17:48

Canada	24–10	Russia

Westhills Stadium, Langford

=== Pool C ===
Team	Pld	W	D	L	PF	PA	PD	Pts
Australia	3	2	1	0	71	24	+47	8
Ireland	3	2	0	1	40	35	+5	7
Spain	3	1	0	2	12	54	-42	5
Fiji	3	0	1	2	45	55	-10	4

27 May 2017
11:14

Fiji	14–19	Ireland

Westhills Stadium, Langford

27 May 2017
11:36

Australia	26–0	Spain

Westhills Stadium, Langford

27 May 2017
13:58

Fiji	7–12	Spain

Westhills Stadium, Langford

27 May 2017
14:20

Australia	21–0	Ireland

Westhills Stadium, Langford

27 May 2017
16:42

Ireland	21–0	Spain

Westhills Stadium, Langford

27 May 2017
17:04

Australia	24–24	Fiji

Westhills Stadium, Langford

== Knockout stage ==
=== Challenge Trophy ===
Semi-finals
28 May 2017 – 11:58 – Westhills Stadium
Spain	31
Netherlands	0
28 May 2017 – 12:20 – Westhills Stadium
Fiji	24
Brazil	19

Challenge Trophy Final
28 May 2017 – 15:26 – Westhills Stadium
Spain	7
Fiji	31
11th Place
28 May 2017 – 15:02 – Westhills Stadium
Netherlands	7
Brazil	28

=== 5th Place ===
Semi-finals
28 May 2017 – 13:36 – Westhills Stadium
England	14
United States	26
28 May 2017 – 13:58 – Westhills Stadium
Ireland	0
Russia	17

5th Place Final
28 May 2017 – 16:42 – Westhills Stadium
United States	21
Russia	26
7th Place
28 May 2017 – 16:20 – Westhills Stadium
England	10
Ireland	14

=== Cup ===
Quarter-finals
28 May 2017 – 10:30 – Westhills Stadium
Canada	33
England	5
28 May 2017 – 10:52 – Westhills Stadium
Australia	22
United States	10
28 May 2017 – 11:14 – Westhills Stadium
France	19
Ireland	5
28 May 2017 – 11:36 – Westhills Stadium
New Zealand	24
Russia	0

Semi-finals
28 May 2017 – 14:20 – Westhills Stadium
Canada	17
Australia	10
28 May 2017 – 14:42 – Westhills Stadium
France	5
New Zealand	28

Cup Final
28 May 2017 – 17:30 – Westhills Stadium
Canada	7
New Zealand	17
Bronze Medal Match
28 May 2017 – 17:04 – Westhills Stadium
Australia	26
France	12

Source: World Rugby

== Tournament placings ==
Place	Team	Points
1st place, gold medalist(s)	New Zealand	20
2nd place, silver medalist(s)	Canada	18
3rd place, bronze medalist(s)	Australia	16
4	France	14
5	Russia	12
6	United States	10

Place	Team	Points
7	Ireland	8
8	England	6
9	Fiji	4
10	Spain	3
11	Brazil	2
12	Netherlands	1

Source: World Rugby

== See also ==
- 2016–17 World Rugby Women's Sevens Series
- World Rugby Women's Sevens Series
- World Rugby
