= 2017 Japan Women's Sevens =

- Women's Sevens Series V
- Host nation: Japan
- Date: 22–23 April 2017

Cup
- Champion: New Zealand
- Runner-up: Canada
- Third: Australia

Challenge
- Winner: Ireland

Tournament details
- Matches played: 34

The 2017 Japan Women's Sevens is the fourth tournament of the 2016–17 World Rugby Women's Sevens Series and the inaugural edition of the Japan Women's Sevens. It is scheduled for the 22–23 April 2017 at the Honjo Athletic Stadium in Kitakyushu.

== Format ==
The teams are drawn into three pools of four teams each. Each team plays every other team in their pool once. The top two teams from each pool advance to the Cup/Plate brackets while the top 2 third place teams also compete in the Cup/Plate. The other teams from each group play-off for the Challenge Trophy.

== Teams ==
The participating teams include:

- Australia
- Brazil
- Canada
- England
- Fiji
- France
- Ireland
- Japan
- New Zealand
- Russia
- Spain
- United States

== Pool stage ==
Key to colours in group tables
Teams that advanced to the Cup Quarterfinal

=== Pool A ===
Team	Pld	W	D	L	PF	PA	PD	Pts
New Zealand	3	3	0	0	72	21	+51	9
Russia	3	2	0	1	62	32	+30	7
France	3	1	0	2	52	50	+2	5
Japan	3	0	0	3	10	93	–83	3

22 April 2017
11:58

Russia	26–5	France

Honjo Athletic Stadium, Kitakyushu

22 April 2017
12:20

New Zealand	31–0	Japan

Honjo Athletic Stadium, Kitakyushu

22 April 2017
14:42

Russia	29–5	Japan

Honjo Athletic Stadium, Kitakyushu

22 April 2017
15:04

New Zealand	19–14	France

Honjo Athletic Stadium, Kitakyushu

22 April 2017
17:26

France	33–5	Japan

Honjo Athletic Stadium, Kitakyushu

22 April 2017
17:48

New Zealand	22–7	Russia

Honjo Athletic Stadium, Kitakyushu

=== Pool B ===
Team	Pld	W	D	L	PF	PA	PD	Pts
Australia	3	3	0	0	91	12	+79	9
Fiji	3	2	0	1	91	24	+67	7
Brazil	3	1	0	2	34	82	–48	5
Ireland	3	0	0	3	10	108	–98	3

22 April 2017
11:14

Fiji	45–0	Ireland

Honjo Athletic Stadium, Kitakyushu

22 April 2017
11:36

Australia	38–0	Brazil

Honjo Athletic Stadium, Kitakyushu

22 April 2017
13:58

Fiji	34–7	Brazil

Honjo Athletic Stadium, Kitakyushu

22 April 2017
14:20

Australia	36–0	Ireland

Honjo Athletic Stadium, Kitakyushu

22 April 2017
16:42

Ireland	10–27	Brazil

Honjo Athletic Stadium, Kitakyushu

22 April 2017
17:04

Australia	17–12	Fiji

Honjo Athletic Stadium, Kitakyushu

=== Pool C ===
Team	Pld	W	D	L	PF	PA	PD	Pts
Canada	3	3	0	0	101	29	+72	9
United States	3	2	0	1	58	44	+14	7
England	3	1	0	2	38	56	–18	5
Spain	3	0	0	3	15	83	–68	3

22 April 2017
10:30

United States	19–10	Spain

Honjo Athletic Stadium, Kitakyushu

22 April 2017
10:52

Canada	29–12	England

Honjo Athletic Stadium, Kitakyushu

22 April 2017
13:14

United States	27–5	England

Honjo Athletic Stadium, Kitakyushu

22 April 2017
13:36

Canada	43–5	Spain

Honjo Athletic Stadium, Kitakyushu

22 April 2017
15:58

Spain	0–21	England

Honjo Athletic Stadium, Kitakyushu

22 April 2017
16:20

Canada	29–12	United States

Honjo Athletic Stadium, Kitakyushu

== Knockout stage ==
=== Challenge Trophy ===
Semi-finals
23 April 2017 – 11:58 – Honjo Athletic Stadium, Kitakyushu
Brazil	5
Ireland	24
23 April 2017 – 12:20 – Honjo Athletic Stadium, Kitakyushu
Spain	14
Japan	5

Challenge Trophy Final
23 April 2017 – 15:04 – Honjo Athletic Stadium, Kitakyushu
Ireland	26
Spain	7
11th Place
23 April 2017 – 14:42 – Honjo Athletic Stadium, Kitakyushu
Brazil	12
Japan	10

=== 5th Place ===
Semi-finals
23 April 2017 – 13:14 – Honjo Athletic Stadium, Kitakyushu
France	5
Russia	26
23 April 2017 – 13:36 – Honjo Athletic Stadium, Kitakyushu
United States	24
England	26

5th Place Final
23 April 2017 – 16:20 – Honjo Athletic Stadium, Kitakyushu
Russia	31
England	0
7th Place
23 April 2017 – 15:58 – Honjo Athletic Stadium, Kitakyushu
France	14
United States	31

=== Cup ===
Quarter-finals
23 April 2017 – 10:30 – Honjo Athletic Stadium, Kitakyushu
Australia	19
France	12
23 April 2017 – 10:52 – Honjo Athletic Stadium, Kitakyushu
Canada	41
Russia	0
23 April 2017 – 11:14 – Honjo Athletic Stadium, Kitakyushu
Fiji	26
United States	19
23 April 2017 – 11:36 – Honjo Athletic Stadium, Kitakyushu
New Zealand	21
England	5

Semi-finals
23 April 2017 – 13:58 – Honjo Athletic Stadium, Kitakyushu
Australia	0
Canada	33
23 April 2017 – 14:20 – Honjo Athletic Stadium, Kitakyushu
Fiji	0
New Zealand	21

Cup Final
23 April 2017 – 17:07 – Honjo Athletic Stadium, Kitakyushu
Canada	14
New Zealand	17
Bronze Medal Match
23 April 2017 – 16:42 – Honjo Athletic Stadium, Kitakyushu
Australia	19
Fiji	17

== Tournament placings ==
Place	Team	Points
1st place, gold medalist(s)	New Zealand	20
2nd place, silver medalist(s)	Canada	18
3rd place, bronze medalist(s)	Australia	16
4	Fiji	14
5	Russia	12
6	England	10

Place	Team	Points
7	United States	8
8	France	6
9	Ireland	4
10	Spain	3
11	Brazil	2
12	Japan	1

== See also ==
- World Rugby Women's Sevens Series
- 2016–17 World Rugby Women's Sevens Series
- World Rugby
