= Hannah Tyrrell =

Ireland international rugby union player

- Born: 10 August 1990 (age 36) Dublin
- Height: 1.80 m (5 ft 11 in)
- Weight: 67 kg (10 st 8 lb)
- School: Coláiste Bríde
- University: Trinity College, Dublin; University College Dublin

Rugby union career
- Position: Out-half, full-back
Senior career
Years	Team	Apps	(Points)
2013–	Old Belvedere		
Provincial / State sides
Years	Team	Apps	(Points)
2014–	Leinster		
International career
Years	Team	Apps	(Points)
2015–2021	Ireland	19	
National sevens team
Years	Team		Comps
201x–	Ireland		

Hannah Tyrrell (born 10 August 1990) is an Ireland women's rugby union international. Tyrrell represented Ireland at the 2017 Women's Rugby World Cup. She was also a member of the Ireland team that won the 2015 Women's Six Nations Championship. Tyrrell is also an Ireland women's rugby sevens international. She has also played two other football codes at a senior level. As a women's association football player, Tyrrell played for St Catherine's in two FAI Women's Cup finals and played for Shamrock Rovers in the Women's National League. She also plays senior Ladies' Gaelic football for Dublin in the Ladies' National Football League.

In 2015 Tyrrell first spoke publicly about her teenage struggles with mental health and an eating disorder and how playing sport helped her recovery. She is an ambassador for the Tackle Your Feelings campaign headed by the Irish Rugby Union Players Association.

== Early years and education ==
Tyrrell was raised in Clondalkin and was educated at Coláiste Bríde. Between 2008 and 2010 she attended Trinity College, Dublin where she studied psychiatric nursing. However, she did not complete her studies at Trinity as she struggled with an eating disorder and self-harm issues. Between 2012 and 2016 Tyrrell attended University College Dublin where she gained a BA in history and geography and is qualified to teach both.

== Gaelic football ==
Hannah Tyrrell
Sport
- Sport: Ladies' Gaelic football
- Position: Goalkeeper / Forward
Clubs
- Years: Club
- 2021-: Round Towers; Na Fianna
Inter-county
- Years: County
- 2021-: Dublin
Inter-county titles
- All-Irelands: 1

=== Club level ===
Tyrrell playing as a forward, scored 1–3 and was named player of the match as she helped Round Towers win the 2011 Dublin Ladies Intermediate Championship, defeating Clontarf in the final by 2–8 to 1–9.

=== Inter-county ===
In 2006 Tyrrell was the goalkeeper of the Dublin team that won the All-Ireland Under-16 Ladies' Football Championship, defeating Cork by 5–16 to 1–10 in the final. Tyrrell was described as "truly outstanding" and was selected as 'Player of the Match' after she saved two penalties in the final.

In 2008 she was a member of the Dublin team that won the All-Ireland Under-18 Ladies' Football Championship, defeating Tyrone by 2–18 to 1–4 in the final. Tyrrell put in another Player of the Match performance as she helped Dublin win the 2010 All-Ireland Senior B Ladies' Football Championship, defeating Cork by 1–12 to 0–4 in the final. By early 2014 Tyrrell was playing for Dublin in the Ladies' National Football League. However she withdrew from the team mid-season when she was awarded a professional contract to play for the Ireland women's national rugby sevens team.

In 2021, after announcing her retirement from international rugby, Tyrrell rejoined the Dublin Ladies Football senior team and quickly established herself for them in the Ladies Gaelic Football National League. In 2023, Tyrell was awarded Player of the Match in Dublin's All-Ireland victory over Kerry.

== Association football ==
Hannah Tyrrell
Personal information
- Date of birth: 10 August 1990 (age 36)
- Place of birth: Dublin, Ireland
- Positions: Defender; midfielder; forward

College career
Years	Team	Apps	(Gls)
2008–2010	Dublin University A.F.C.		

Senior career*
Years	Team	Apps	(Gls)
2009–2011	St Catherine's		
2011–201x	Shamrock Rovers		

International career
2010	Ireland Universities		
- * Club domestic league appearances and goals

While attending Trinity College, Dublin, Tyrrell played both association football and futsal for Dublin University A.F.C. She also played for Ireland Universities.

Tyrrell played for St Catherine's in two FAI Women's Cup finals. In 2009 she was in the team that lost 1–0 to St Francis. In 2011 she finished on the winning side when St Catherine's won 3–1 win against Wilton United. Other members of the St Catherine's team included Caroline Thorpe, Mary Waldron and Noelle Murray. Tyrrell also played for Shamrock Rovers during the inaugural 2011–12 Women's National League season.

== Rugby union ==
=== Club and province ===
Before 2013 Tyrrell had never played women's rugby union. However she was encouraged to try out for Old Belvedere by former Ireland international Sharon Lynch. Tyrrell has also represented Leinster in the IRFU Women's Interprovincial Series, helping them win the 2016 title.

=== Ireland international ===
On 6 February 2015 Tyrrell made her debut for the Ireland women's national rugby union team in the 2015 Women's Six Nations Championship against Italy. In her debut season, Tyrrell helped Ireland win the championship. Tyrrell also represented Ireland at the 2017 Women's Rugby World Cup.

Tyrrell has also played for the Ireland women's national rugby sevens team in the World Rugby Women's Sevens Series. In February 2017 Tyrrell, together with Alison Miller and Sene Naoupu, was controversially withdrawn from Ireland's 2017 Women's Six Nations Championship squad in order to represent the Ireland Sevens in the 2017 USA Women's Sevens. The Ireland women's Sevens were chasing a top eight finish in the 2016–17 World Rugby Women's Sevens Series in order to qualify for the 2018 Rugby World Cup Sevens.

Tyrrell was also part of Ireland's bid to qualify for the Tokyo Olympics Rugby Sevens. Their qualification bid ended when they were beaten by England in the quarter-finals of a Qualifying tournament in Kazan in July 2019.

She won 30 caps for Ireland's Sevens team from 2014 to 2020.

In October 2020 she returned to the Ireland XV squad after a six-year absence while playing Sevens. She had previously played wing or full-back but Adam Griggs gave her a new role at out-half in which she excelled in the final game of the 2020 Women's Six Nations.

She was Ireland's first-choice out-half and place-kicker for the 2021 Women's Six Nations. The opening game, against Wales, came a day after she was due to marry her fiancée Sorcha Turnbull but their wedding was postponed because of the COVID-19 pandemic.

Tyrrell has 20 caps for the Ireland women's national rugby union team and has scored 42 points.

She announced her retirement from international rugby at the end of the 2021 season.

== Honours ==
=== Rugby union ===
Ireland

- Women's Six Nations Championship
  - Winners: 2015
- Triple Crown
  - Winners: 2015

Leinster

- IRFU Women's Interprovincial Series
  - Winners: 2016

=== Gaelic football ===
Dublin

- All-Ireland Under-16 Ladies' Football Championship
  - Winners: 2006
- All-Ireland Under-18 Ladies' Football Championship
  - Winners: 2008
- All-Ireland Senior B Ladies' Football Championship
  - Winners: 2010
- All-Ireland Senior Ladies' Football Championship
  - Winners: 2023 and 2025

Round Towers

- Dublin Ladies Intermediate Championship
  - Winners: 2011

=== Association football ===
St Catherine's

- FAI Women's Cup
  - Winners: 2011
  - Runners-up: 2009
