= Spain Women's Sevens =

Annual World Rugby Sevens Series tournament

- Sport: Rugby sevens
- First season: 2022
- No. of teams: 12
- Website: spain7s.com

The Spain Women's Sevens is an annual international rugby sevens tournament that was played as two back-to-back events on consecutive weekends in late January that year. The first event was held in Málaga at Estadio Ciudad de Málaga and the second was held in Seville at Estadio de La Cartuja. These events were hosted by the Spanish Rugby Federation as the third and fourth stops on the 2021–22 season of the World Rugby Women's Sevens Series.

== Results ==
Year	Venue	Cup final			Placings			Refs
		Winner	Score	Runner-up	Third	Fourth	Fifth	
2022 I	Estadio Ciudad de Málaga	United States	35–10	Russia	Australia	France	Ireland	
2022 II	Estadio La Cartuja	Australia	17–12	Ireland	England	United States	France	
2024	Cívitas Metropolitano	Australia	26–7	France	New Zealand	Canada	United States	

== See also ==
- Spain Sevens (for men's teams)
