= 2017 USA Women's Sevens =

- Women's Sevens Series V
- Host nation: United States
- Date: 3–5 March 2017

Cup
- Champion: New Zealand
- Runner-up: Australia
- Third: Canada

Challenge
- Winner: Spain

The 2017 USA Women's Sevens was the third tournament of the 2016–17 World Rugby Women's Sevens Series, held from March 3–5, 2017 at the Sam Boyd Stadium in Whitney, Nevada, a community in the Las Vegas area. This was the first edition of the Women's Sevens held alongside the USA Sevens men's tournament.

== Format ==
The teams were drawn into three pools of four teams each. Each team played every other team in their pool once. The top two teams from each pool advanced to the Cup/Plate brackets while the top 2 third place teams also competed for the Cup/Plate. The other teams from each group played off for the Challenge Trophy.

== Teams ==
The participating teams include:

- Australia
- Canada
- England
- Fiji
- France
- Ireland
- New Zealand
- Russia
- Spain
- United States
- Brazil
- Argentina

== Pool stage ==
Key to colours in group tables
Teams that advanced to the Cup Quarterfinal

=== Pool A ===
Team	Pld	W	D	L	PF	PA	PD	Pts
Canada	3	3	0	0	93	21	+72	9
Russia	3	2	0	1	65	53	+12	7
France	3	1	0	2	71	50	+21	5
Argentina	3	0	0	3	14	119	–105	3

3 March 2017

Canada	34–7	Russia

Sam Boyd Stadium, Las Vegas

3 March 2017

France	45–7	Argentina

Sam Boyd Stadium, Las Vegas

3 March 2017

Canada	38–7	Argentina

Sam Boyd Stadium, Las Vegas

3 March 2017

France	19–22	Russia

Sam Boyd Stadium, Las Vegas

3 March 2017
14:31

Canada	21–7	France

Sam Boyd Stadium, Las Vegas

3 March 2017
14:53

Russia	36–0	Argentina

Sam Boyd Stadium, Las Vegas

=== Pool B ===
Team	Pld	W	D	L	PF	PA	PD	Pts
United States	3	2	0	1	57	38	+19	7
Fiji	3	2	0	1	59	38	+21	7
Ireland	3	1	1	1	43	66	–23	6
Spain	3	0	1	2	40	57	–17	4

3 March 2017

United States	21–24	Ireland

Sam Boyd Stadium, Las Vegas

3 March 2017

Fiji	21–19	Spain

Sam Boyd Stadium, Las Vegas

3 March 2017

United States	22–7	Spain

Sam Boyd Stadium, Las Vegas

3 March 2017

Fiji	31–5	Ireland

Sam Boyd Stadium, Las Vegas

3 March 2017
13:47

United States	14–7	Fiji

Sam Boyd Stadium, Las Vegas

3 March 2017
14:09

Ireland	14–14	Spain

Sam Boyd Stadium, Las Vegas

=== Pool C ===
Team	Pld	W	D	L	PF	PA	PD	Pts
New Zealand	3	3	0	0	72	19	+53	9
Australia	3	2	0	1	83	35	+48	7
England	3	1	0	2	31	58	–27	5
Brazil	3	0	0	3	0	74	–74	3

3 March 2017

New Zealand	24–0	Brazil

Sam Boyd Stadium, Las Vegas

3 March 2017

Australia	31–14	England

Sam Boyd Stadium, Las Vegas

3 March 2017

New Zealand	27–5	England

Sam Boyd Stadium, Las Vegas

3 March 2017

Australia	38–0	Brazil

Sam Boyd Stadium, Las Vegas

3 February 2017
15:15

New Zealand	21–14	Australia

Sam Boyd Stadium, Las Vegas

3 February 2017
15:37

Brazil	0–12	England

Sam Boyd Stadium, Las Vegas

== Knockout stage ==
=== Challenge Trophy ===
Semi-finals
4 March 2017 – 08:00 – Sam Boyd Stadium
England	45
Argentina	7
4 March 2017 – 08:22 – Sam Boyd Stadium
Spain	19
Brazil	7

Challenge Trophy Final
4 March 2017 – 11:28 – Sam Boyd Stadium
England	0
Spain	10
11th Place
4 March 2017 – 11:06 – Sam Boyd Stadium
Argentina	0
Brazil	41

=== 5th place ===
Semi-finals
4 March 2017 – 11:50 – Sam Boyd Stadium
France	12
Fiji	15
4 March 2017 – 12:12 – Sam Boyd Stadium
Ireland	5
Russia	20

5th Place Final
4 March 2017 – 16:52 – Sam Boyd Stadium
Fiji	19
Russia	17
7th Place
4 March 2017 – 17:16 – Sam Boyd Stadium
France	15
Ireland	5

=== Cup ===
Quarter-finals
4 March 2017 – 08:44 – Sam Boyd Stadium
Canada	33
France	0
4 March 2017 – 09:06 – Sam Boyd Stadium
Fiji	7
Australia	22
4 March 2017 – 09:28 – Sam Boyd Stadium
United States	20
Ireland	12
4 March 2017 – 09:50 – Sam Boyd Stadium
New Zealand	26
Russia	5

Semi-finals
4 March 2017 – 12:34 – Sam Boyd Stadium
Canada	17
Australia	26
4 March 2017 – 12:56 – Sam Boyd Stadium
United States	7
New Zealand	12

Cup Final
4 March 2017 – 18:08 – Sam Boyd Stadium
Australia	5
New Zealand	28
Bronze Medal Match
4 March 2017 – 17:40 – Sam Boyd Stadium
Canada	31
United States	7

== Tournament placings ==
Place	Team	Points
1st place, gold medalist(s)	New Zealand	20
2nd place, silver medalist(s)	Australia	18
3rd place, bronze medalist(s)	Canada	16
4	United States	14
5	Fiji	12
6	Russia	10

Place	Team	Points
7	France	8
8	Ireland	6
9	Spain	4
10	England	3
11	Brazil	2
12	Argentina	1

Source: World Rugby

== See also ==
- 2017 USA Sevens
- World Rugby Women's Sevens Series
- 2016–17 World Rugby Women's Sevens Series
- World Rugby
