= Japan Women's Sevens =

Annual women's rugby sevens tournament

The Japan Women's Sevens was an annual women's rugby sevens tournament, it was previously hosted in Kitakyushu as one of the stops on the World Rugby Women's Sevens Series. Japan joined for the fifth edition of the series. The tournament was played at the Mikuni World Stadium.

== Champions ==
Year	Venue	Cup final			Placings			Refs
		Winner	Score	Runner-up	Third	Fourth	Challenge Trophy	
2015	Chichibunomiya Rugby Stadium	Japan	22–0	Kazakhstan	Hong Kong	China		
2017	Mikuni World Stadium Kitakyushu	New Zealand	17–14	Canada	Australia	Fiji	Ireland	
2018	Mikuni World Stadium Kitakyushu	New Zealand	24–12	France	Australia	Spain	United States	
2019	Mikuni World Stadium Kitakyushu	Canada	7–5	England	United States	France	Fiji	

Key:
Blue border on the left indicates tournaments included in the World Rugby Women's Sevens Series.

== See also ==
- Japan Sevens (men's tournament)
