= Rugby X =

Variant of rugby union

- Highest governing body: World Rugby
- Nicknames: X, Rugby X

Characteristics
- Contact: Full Contact
- Team members: five
- Mixed-sex: Separate competitions
- Type: Team sport, indoor, variant of rugby union

Rugby X is a variant of rugby union, or more precisely rugby sevens, in which teams are made up of five players, typically three forwards and two backs. Matches are much shorter, usually played for ten minutes, without any half-time break.

The game was invented by Ben Ryan as variant of rugby sevens with more speed and action, and was first launched on 29 October 2019 as a six teams international tournament in The O2 Arena, London.

The rules (law variations) are similar to rugby sevens and are approved by World Rugby.

== Rules ==
The game is intended as a fast-paced version of rugby sevens, but contrary to this seven-a-side version, its rules vastly diverge from the rugby union classic rules:

- The pitch is half-sized compared to rugby sevens, with 55m x 32m dimensions plus 5m run offs.
- There are five players per side plus seven rolling substitutes that are allowed to come in at breaks in play following tries.
- The only score is the try; there are no conversions, drop goals or penalties. Tries are worth 5 points unless touched down within the "max zone", a 15-m wide space in the middle of the in-goal area. Tries in that area are worth 7 points.
- Kick-offs are replaced by tap starts on the scored-upon team's 5m line, with the opposing team standing 10m back.
- Chip kicks allowed but not box kicks, up and unders or any kick over 10m in height (referee is supposed to receive real time notification using ball tracking technology)
- Lineouts are replaced by quick throws made by a substitute.
- Scrums consist of three players per team with no pushing. Hooking the ball is allowed.
- Drawn matches are settled by a ‘one on one’ involving one defender on 5m line and one attacker 30m from goal with a ball. The attacker has 10 seconds to score. It is played as per a sudden death penalty shoot out – if Team A scores, Team B must then score or Team A wins the match.

== History ==
The project was initially launched by Ben Ryan, former Olympic gold medalist Fiji's coach, with the cooperation of both World Rugby and RFU; the first tournament being held in London, England.

== Tournaments ==
- 2019 Rugby X Tournament
  - Sides included France, Ireland, United States and England national sevens teams for the women's tournament and France, Ireland, United States, England and Argentina national sevens teams plus a Barbarian F.C. invitational team for the men's tournament.
  - The women's tournament was won by England and the men's tournament by Argentina.
