= 2019 Rugby X Tournament =

2019 Rugby X Men's Tournament
Host	(England) London
Venue	The O2 Arena
Date	29 October 2019
Teams	6
Final Results
Champions	Argentina
Runners-up	Ireland

The 2019 Rugby X Tournament was held on 29 October, 2019 at The O2 Arena. The entire men and women's competitions were held the same day, as games only last ten minutes in total. Both tournaments featured national Rugby sevens teams from each that were represented. The men's tournament featured six teams between two groups. All teams qualified for the knock-out phase, as group play only positioned teams based on their final rank. The women's tournament only featured four teams; thus, the tournament only included a knock-out phase. This also included a third and fourth place game, which the men's tournament did not.

== Men's group phase ==
=== Group A ===
Team	Pld	W	D	L	PF	PA
Ireland	2	2	0	0	55	30
Barbarian F.C.	2	0	1	1	40	45
England	2	0	1	1	30	50

Match 1

Barbarian F.C.	20 – 20	England

The O2 Arena

Match 4

Ireland	25 – 20	Barbarian F.C.

The O2 Arena

Match 7

Ireland	30 – 10	England

The O2 Arena

=== Group B ===
Team	Pld	W	D	L	PF	PA
France	2	2	0	0	50	35
Argentina	2	1	0	1	60	45
United States	2	0	0	2	35	65

Match 2

Argentina	40 – 20	United States

The O2 Arena

Match 5

France	25 – 15	United States

The O2 Arena

Match 8

France	25 – 20	Argentina

The O2 Arena

== Men's knock-out phase ==
Quarter-finals
Ireland
Bye
Barbarian F.C.	15
United States	35
France
Bye
Argentina	55
England	15

Semi-finals
United States	20
Ireland	25
France	20
Argentina	25

Final
Ireland	15
Argentina	25

== Women's tournament ==
2019 Rugby X Women's Tournament
Host	(England) London
Venue	The O2 Arena
Date	29 October 2019
Teams	4
Final Results
Champions	England
Runners-up	United States
Third place	France
Fourth place	Ireland

Semi-finals
England	35
France	20
Ireland	15
United States	30

Final
England	20 (3)
United States	20 (2)
Third place
France	35
Ireland	20
