= Ángela del Pan =

- Full name: Ángela del Pan Moruno
- Born: 19 April 1985 (age 41) Bilbao, Spain
- Height: 1.73 m (5 ft 8 in)
- Weight: 68 kg (150 lb)

Rugby union career
- Position: Flanker
Senior career
Years	Team	Apps	(Points)
2005–2017	Club Esportiu INEF Barcelona		(0)
2017–2021	Sanse Scrum Rugby		(0)
2021–2022	Pozuelo RU		(0)
International career
Years	Team	Apps	(Points)
2005–2017	Spain	37	(0)
National sevens team
Years	Team		Comps
2005–2017	Spain 7s		197
Coaching career
- Years: Team
- 2022–2024: CR Sant Cugat Fem. (Assistant coach)

Ángela del Pan Moruno (Bilbao, born 19 April 1985) is a former Spanish rugby player.

== Career ==
Del Pan played as a Flanker, she trained at the Club Esportiu INEF Barcelona where she played a large part of her sports career. With the Barcelona club, she won eight Catalan Championships consecutively (2005–12) and six Spanish Championships (2006, 2007, 2009, 2010, 2011, being chosen best player of the championship, 2012).

She represented Spain at an international level on 234 occasions with the Spanish XV and 7's rugby teams, was proclaimed several times European champion in both modalities.

She has participated in two Women's Rugby World Cups (2014 and 2017) and the 2016 Summer Olympics in Rio de Janeiro in rugby sevens, obtaining a diploma Olympic. Competing with the Catalan national team, she won a Spanish Championship of regional national teams (2012) and was runner-up the following year.

After her retirement from sport in 2017, she graduated in Physical Activity and Sport Sciences at the INEFC. She served as a delegate for the Spanish XV and 7's rugby teams (2017–18) and as technical coordinator of the Spanish Rugby Federation (2019–22).

== Achievements ==
Teams

- 8 Campionats de Catalunya de rugbi femení: 2004–05, 2005–06, 2006–07, 2007–08, 2008–09, 2009–10, 2010–11, 2011–12
- 6 Campionats d'Espanya de rugbi femení: 2005–06, 2006–07, 2008–09, 2009–10, 2010–11, 2011–12

Spanish selection

- 1 gold medal at the European XV Championship: 2010
- 1 silver medal at the European XV Rugby Championship: 2011
- 1 gold medal at the European Rugby Championship at 7: 2010
- 1 silver medal at the European Rugby Championship at 7: 2009
