= Berta García =

Spanish rugby sevens player (born 1982)

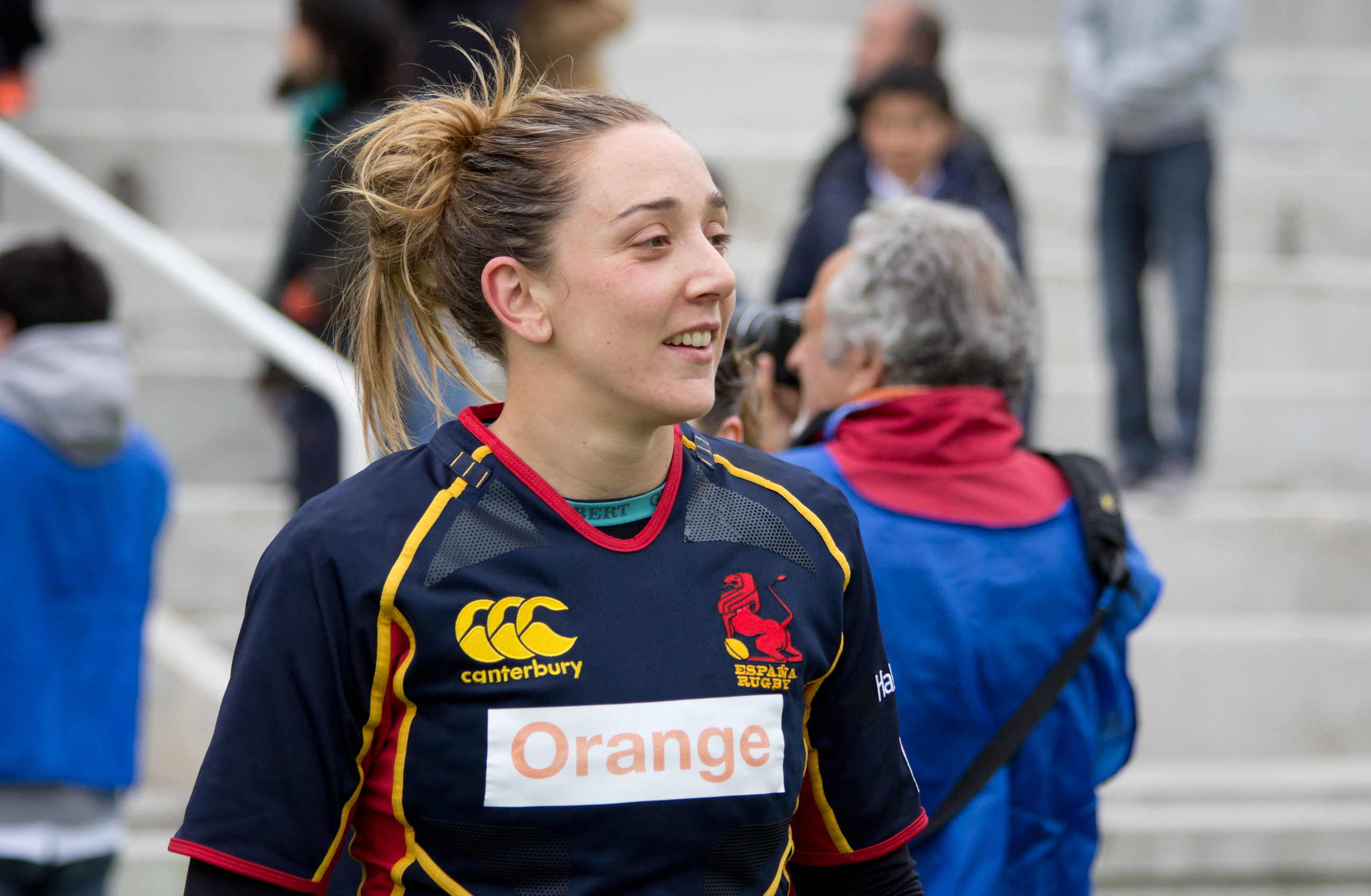
- García in 2013
- Born: 12 April 1982 (age 44)
- Height: 1.73 m (5 ft 8 in)
- Weight: 70 kg (150 lb; 11 st 0 lb)

Rugby union career
International career
Years	Team	Apps	(Points)
- Spain
National sevens team
Years	Team		Comps
2013–?	Spain		

Berta García (born 12 April 1982) is a former Spanish rugby union and sevens player. She competed for Spain in two Rugby World Cups, 2014 and 2017. She also represented Spain at the 2016 Summer Olympics.

== Career ==
García was named in Spain's sevens squad for the 2013 Rugby World Cup Sevens in Russia. She later represented Spain's national fifteens team at the 2014 Women's Rugby World Cup that was held in France.

In 2016, She competed at the Women's Rugby Sevens Final Olympic Qualification Tournament in Ireland. She subsequently represented Spain at the 2016 Summer Olympics in Brazil.

García played for Spain at the 2017 Women's Rugby World Cup.
