= Coláiste Bríde =

Location
- Clondalkin, County Dublin; Ireland; 53.3176°N 6.3893°W

Information
- School type: All girls school
- Motto: "To Teach, To Guide, To Form"
- Religious affiliation: Catholic
- Principal: Marie Therese Kilmartin
- Enrollment: 993 (2026)

Coláiste Bríde is an all-girls secondary school located in Clondalkin, South Dublin, Ireland. The school was founded by the Presentation Sisters in 1955. Coláiste Bríde is a voluntary Catholic secondary school, operating under the trusteeship of CEIST (Catholic Education an Irish Schools Trust). As of 2026, the school had 993 pupils enrolled.

== History ==
Coláiste Bríde was founded by the Presentation Sisters in 1955. Originally based within the Presentation Sisters convent, the school moved to a new premises in 1969.

Construction of a new building, costing approximately 13 million euro, began in 2004. Officially opened in May 2008, the new building included new facilities such as a canteen, gym, library, science labs, home economics kitchens, IT labs, three art rooms, a garden and lockers. A St Brigid's Cross design featured in the reception and general purpose area was designed by a sixth year student of Coláiste Bríde who was on work experience in an architect's office at the time.

== Extracurricular activities ==
Sports undertaken at the school include volleyball, football, Gaelic football, camogie, basketball, badminton, tennis, table tennis and gymnastics. There are also language clubs, a maths club, and photography club and debating activities.

A Christmas concert is organised each year, and a musical is sometimes performed by students in Transition Year of Colaiste Bride and Moyle Park College. Past performances have included Grease, Fame, All Shook Up (2018), Six (2024) and Sister Act (performed in 2026).

== Notable former students ==
- Mary Kennedy, broadcaster
- Hannah Tyrrell, Ireland women's rugby union international
