= 2016–17 World Rugby Women's Sevens Series =

World Rugby Women's Sevens Series V
- Hosts: United Arab Emirates; Australia; United States; Japan; Canada; France
- Date: 1 Dec 2016 – 25 June 2017

Final positions
- Champions: New Zealand
- Runners-up: Australia
- Third: Canada

The 2016–17 World Rugby Women's Sevens Series was the fifth edition of the World Rugby Women's Sevens Series (formerly the IRB Women's Sevens World Series), an annual series of tournaments organised by World Rugby for women's national teams in rugby sevens.

== The competition ==
Six tournament events were held in the 2016–17 edition. Twelve teams competed at each event; eleven being "core" teams, with a twelfth team invited to participate in particular events (similar to previous women's series as well as the men's counterpart). At each event teams compete for gold, silver and bronze medals with the third place match now renamed as the Bronze match while lower ranked teams will contest a new Challenge Trophy competition. The overall winner of the series was determined by points gained from the standings across all events in the season.

=== Teams ===
Eleven "core teams" qualified to participate in all series events for the 2016–17 series, the same number as the previous season. The top nine finishers in the previous series were granted core team status:

- Australia
- Canada
- England
- Fiji
- France
- New Zealand
- Russia
- Spain
- United States

Two additional core teams qualified for the 2016–17 series:

- Brazil – ninth place (highest finisher not already qualified) at the 2016 Olympic Games
- Ireland – third place (highest finisher not already qualified) at the 2016 Olympic Qualification Tournament

The twelfth team at each tournament in the 2016–17 series was invited at the discretion of World Rugby.

=== Events ===
2016–17 Itinerary
Leg	Venue (Area)	Dates	Winner
Dubai	The Sevens, Dubai	1–2 December 2016	New Zealand
Australia	Sydney Football Stadium, Sydney	3–4 February 2017	Canada
United States	Sam Boyd Stadium, Las Vegas	3–5 March 2017	New Zealand
Japan	Mikuni World Stadium Kitakyushu, Kitakyushu	22–23 April 2017	New Zealand
Canada	Westhills Stadium, Langford, British Columbia	27–28 May 2017	New Zealand
France	Stade Gabriel Montpied, Clermont-Ferrand	24–25 June 2017	New Zealand

== Standings ==
Final standings for the 2016–17 series:

2016–17 World Rugby Women's Sevens – Series V
Pos.	Event Team	Dubai	Sydney	Las Vegas	Kitakyushu	Langford	Claremont	Points total
1	New Zealand	20	16	20	20	20	20	116
2	Australia	18	14	18	16	16	18	100
3	Canada	10	20	16	18	18	16	98
4	Fiji	12	12	12	14	4	12	66
5	Russia	16	8	10	12	12	8	66
6	United States	2	18	14	8	10	10	62
7	France	8	10	8	6	14	14	60
8	England	14	3	3	10	6	1	37
9	Ireland	4	6	6	4	8	6	34
10	Spain	3	2	4	3	3	4	19
11	Brazil	1	4	2	2	2	2	13
12	South Africa	6	–	–	–	–	–	6
13	Japan	–	–	–	1	–	3	4
14	Papua New Guinea	–	1	–	–	–	–	1
15	Argentina	–	–	1	–	–	–	1
16	Netherlands	–	–	–	–	1	–	1

Source: World Rugby (archived)

Event medalists
Gold	Event Champions
Silver	Event Runner-ups
Bronze	Event Third place finishers
Qualification for 2017–18 World Sevens Series
Green	Qualified as a core team for Series 2017–18
No colour	The remainder do not directly qualify for 2017–18
Qualification for 2018 Rugby World Cup Sevens
Already confirmed for 2018 (host country United States and 2013 semifinalists)
Qualified as one of the four highest placed teams from Series 2016–17 that have not already qualified.

== Tournaments ==
=== Dubai ===
In the first event of the series, New Zealand took revenge for their Olympic final loss by defeating Australia in the Cup final. The three medalists from the Olympic Games were unbeaten in the pool stage of the competition. In the quarter-finals stage, Russia put behind their failure to qualify for the Olympics earlier in the year by eliminating Rio bronze medalists Canada. The final was a repeat of the Olympic final with Australia battling throughout the final but tries to Portia Woodman and Rebekah Cordero-Tufuga gave New Zealand the gold medal. The 5th place final was won by Fiji, while Ireland won the first Challenge Trophy which replaced the Bowl competition.

Event	Winners	Score	Finalists	Semi-finalists
Cup	New Zealand	17–5	Australia	Russia (Bronze); England
5th place	Fiji	17–14	Canada	France (7th); South Africa
Challenge Trophy	Ireland	14–12	Spain	United States (11th); Brazil

=== Sydney ===
Australia was included on the women's world circuit for the first time at the 2017 Sydney Women's Sevens. On the opening day of competition, England was the only core team not to make the Cup quarterfinals with only a win against Spain from their three pool matches. The upset of the tournament came from the United States as they defeated New Zealand in the semifinal stage. Canada won the Cup final over their North American neighbours, however, by 21–17. Fiji won the 5th place final for the second time in a row and Brazil won the Challenge Trophy.

Event	Winners	Score	Finalists	Semi-finalists
Cup	Canada	21–17	United States	New Zealand (Bronze); Australia
5th place	Fiji	31–12	France	Russia (7th); Ireland
Challenge Trophy	Brazil	17–12	England	Spain (11th); Papua New Guinea

=== Las Vegas ===
After a month break, the tour headed to the United States for the first USA Women's Sevens tournament to be held in Las Vegas. On the opening day of competition, Canada and New Zealand each recorded a three from three in the pool stage. Also during the day Ghislaine Landry converting Moleschi's try got her level with Portia Woodman as the all-time leading point scorer in the series with 665. New Zealand took the Cup on the second day, defeating Australia 28-5 and didn't look troubled throughout the final match. In the bronze medal match, Canada maintained their edge over the hosts winning by 31–7. in the minor play-offs, Fiji won the 5th place final again while Spain took the Challenge Trophy.

Event	Winners	Score	Finalists	Semi-finalists
Cup	New Zealand	28–5	Australia	Canada (Bronze); United States
5th place	Fiji	19–17	Russia	France (7th); Ireland
Challenge Trophy	Spain	10–0	England	Brazil (11th); Argentina

=== Kitakyushu ===
The series headed off to Japan for the first ever Japan Women's Sevens. The opening day would see the top three at the time in New Zealand, Australia and Canada winning all three of their matches in the group stage. The second day would see the top three qualify through to the cup semi-finals with Fiji being the fourth team as they made it through to the Cup Semi-finals for the first time since 2014. But New Zealand would take the Cup title for the third tournament of the season as they defeated Canada in the final in a cup final meeting for the first time since Atlanta 2014. Russia would finish in fifth place while Ireland took out the Challenge after defeating Spain.

Event	Winners	Score	Finalists	Semi-finalists
Cup	New Zealand	17–14	Canada	Australia (Bronze); Fiji
5th place	Russia	31–0	England	United States (7th); France
Challenge Trophy	Ireland	26–7	Spain	Brazil (11th); Japan

=== Langford ===
Event	Winners	Score	Finalists	Semi-finalists
Cup	New Zealand	17–7	Canada	Australia (Bronze); France
5th place	Russia	26–21	United States	Ireland (7th); England
Challenge Trophy	Fiji	31–7	Spain	Brazil (11th); Netherlands

=== Clermont-Ferrand ===
Event	Winners	Score	Finalists	Semi-finalists
Cup	New Zealand	22–7	Australia	Canada (Bronze); France
5th place	Fiji	24–19	United States	Russia (7th); Ireland
Challenge Trophy	Spain	15–14	Japan	Brazil (11th); England

== Placings summary ==
Tallies of top four tournament placings during the 2016–17 series, by team (updated to Canada):

Team	(gold) Gold	(silver) Silver	(bronze) Bronze	Fourth	Total
New Zealand	5	-	1	-	6
Canada	1	2	2	-	5
Australia	-	3	2	1	6
United States	-	1	-	1	2
Russia	-	-	1	-	1
France	-	-	-	2	2
England	-	-	-	1	1
Fiji	-	-	-	1	1
Totals	6	6	6	6	24

== See also ==
- 2016–17 World Rugby Sevens Series (for men)
- 2017 Hong Kong Women's Sevens
