= Canada women's national rugby sevens team =

Canada
- Union: Rugby Canada
- Coach: Jocelyn Barrieau
- Captain: Olivia Apps
- Most caps: Bianca Farella (241)
- Top scorer: Ghislaine Landry (1,356)
- Most tries: Bianca Farella (168)
Team kit	Change kit

World Cup Sevens
- Appearances: 3 (First in 2009)
- Best result: Runners-up (2013)

The Canada women's national rugby sevens team was one of six 'core teams' that competed in all four rounds of the inaugural World Rugby Women's Sevens Series in 2012–13. Canada competed at the 2016 Summer Olympics and won the bronze medal after defeating Great Britain 33–10. At the 2020 Olympics, they failed to medal and finished in 9th place.

They participated at the 2021 Canada Women's Sevens in Vancouver and Edmonton. Canada finished third at both tournaments.

At the 2024 Summer Olympics, Canada won the silver medal after coming from 0–12 behind to defeat Australia by 21–12 in the semi-finals, before losing the final to New Zealand by 12–19.

== Tournament history ==
A red box around the year indicates tournaments played within Canada

=== Summer Olympics ===
Olympic Games record
Year	Round	Position	Pld	W	L	D
(Brazil) 2016	Bronze Medal Game	3rd place, bronze medalist(s)	6	4	2	0
(Japan) 2020	9–12th place	9th	5	3	2	0
(France) 2024	Gold Medal Game	2nd place, silver medalist(s)	6	4	2	0
Total	0 Titles	3/3	17	11	6	0

=== Rugby World Cup Sevens ===
World Cup record
Year	Round	Position	Pld	W	L	D
(United Arab Emirates) 2009	Plate Finalists	6th	6	3	3	0
(Russia) 2013	Finalists	2nd place, silver medalist(s)	6	4	2	0
(United States) 2018	Quarter-finalists	7th	4	2	2	0
(South Africa) 2022	Quarter-finalists	6th	4	2	2	0
Total	0 Titles	4/4	20	11	9	0

=== Pan American Games ===
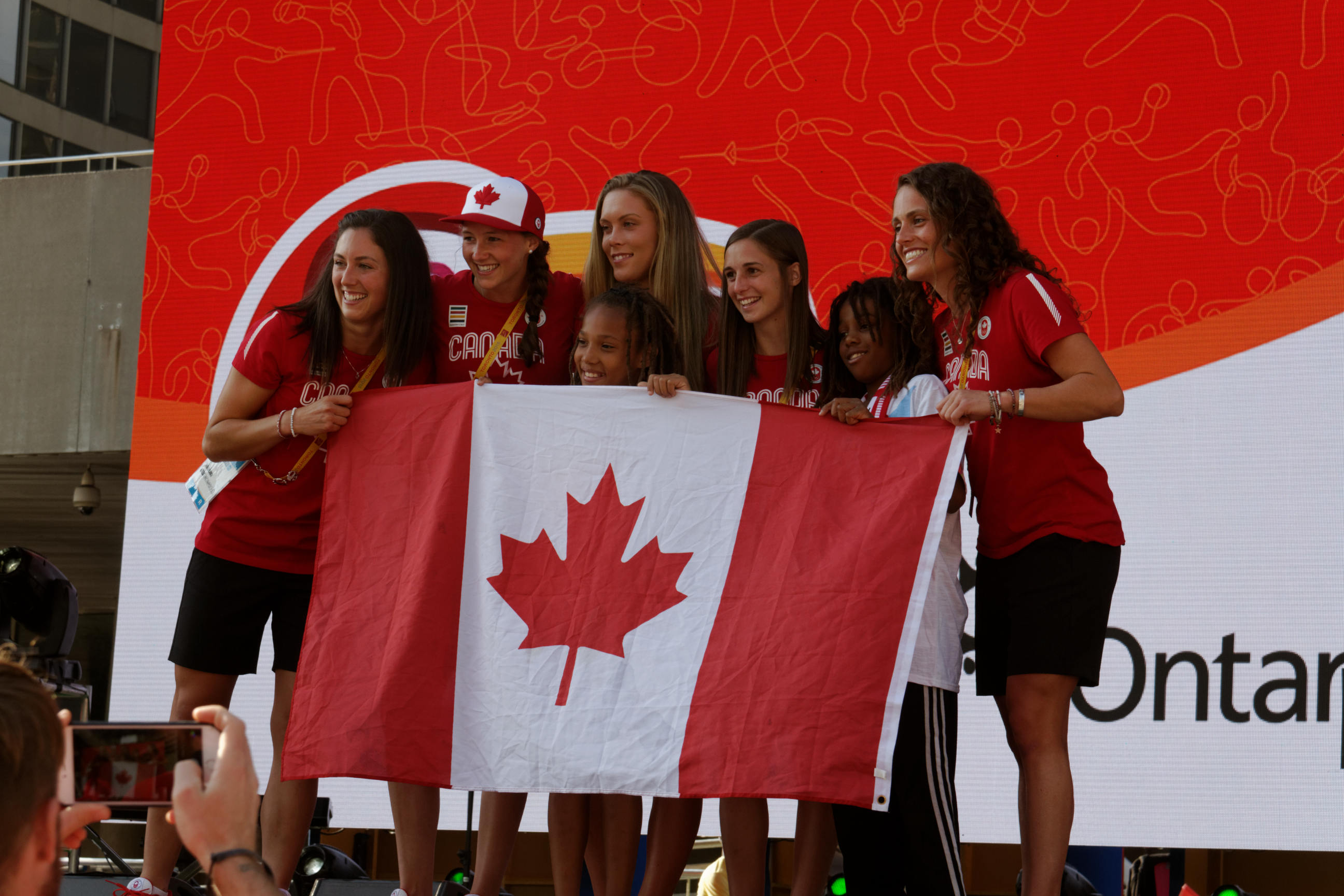
Sevens athletes for the 2015 Pan American Games pose with a fan.

Pan Am Games record
Year	Round	Position	Pld	W	L	D
(Canada) 2015	Finals	1st place, gold medalist(s)	6	6	0	0
(Peru) 2019	Finals	1st place, gold medalist(s)	5	5	0	0
(Chile) 2023	Finals	2nd place, silver medalist(s)	5	4	1	0
Total	2 Titles	3/3	16	15	1	0

=== Commonwealth Games ===
Commonwealth Games record
Year	Round	Position	Pld	W	L	D
(Australia) 2018	Bronze medal	4th	5	2	3	0
(England) 2022	Bronze medal	4th	5	2	3	0
Total	0 Titles	2/2	10	4	6	0

=== World Rugby Women's Sevens Series ===
==== Results by season ====
Season	Round 1	Round 2	Round 3	Round 4	Round 5	Round 6	Round 7	Round 8	Round 9	Position	Points
2012–13	(United Arab Emirates); Dubai; 6th	(United States); Houston; 7th	(China); Guangzhou; (bronze) rd	(Netherlands); Amsterdam; (silver) nd						(bronze) rd	52
2013–14	(United Arab Emirates); Dubai; 4th	(United States); Atlanta; (silver) nd	(Brazil); São Paulo; (bronze) rd	(China); Guangzhou; (bronze) rd	(Netherlands); Amsterdam; (bronze) rd					(bronze) rd	80
2014–15	(United Arab Emirates); Dubai; (bronze) rd	(Brazil); São Paulo; (bronze) rd	(United States); Atlanta; (bronze) rd	(Canada); Victoria; 6th	(England); London; (silver) nd	(Netherlands); Amsterdam; (gold) st				(silver) nd	96
2015–16	(United Arab Emirates); Dubai; 6th	(Brazil); São Paulo; (silver) nd	(United States); Atlanta; 4th	(Canada); Langford; 5th	(France); Clermont-Ferrand; (gold) st					(bronze) rd	74
2016–17	(United Arab Emirates); Dubai; 6th	(Australia); Sydney; (gold) st	(United States); Las Vegas; (bronze) rd	(Japan); Kitakyushu; (silver) nd	(Canada); Langford; (silver) nd	(France); Clermont-Ferrand; (bronze) rd				(bronze) rd	98
2017–18	(United Arab Emirates); Dubai; 4th	(Australia); Sydney; (bronze) rd	(Japan); Kitakyushu; 11th	(Canada); Langford; 5th	(France); Paris; (bronze) rd					4th	60
2018–19	(United States); Glendale (Denver); (bronze) rd	(United Arab Emirates); Dubai; (silver) nd	(Australia); Sydney; 5th	(Japan); Kitakyushu; (gold) st	(Canada); Langford; 5th	(France); Biarritz; (bronze) rd				(bronze) rd	94
2019–20	(United States); Glendale (Denver); 6th	(United Arab Emirates); Dubai; (silver) nd	(South Africa); Cape Town; (bronze) rd	(New Zealand); Hamilton; (silver) nd	(Australia); Sydney; (silver) nd	Hong Kong cancelled	(Canada); Langford cancelled	(France); Paris cancelled		(silver) nd	80
2021 cancelled											
2021–22	(United Arab Emirates); Dubai I 8th	(United Arab Emirates); Dubai II; 8th	(Spain); Málaga; 6th	(Spain); Seville; 7th	Hong Kong cancelled	(Canada); Langford; 5th	(France); Toulouse; 6th			7th	52
2022–23	(United Arab Emirates); Dubai; 9th	(South Africa); Cape Town; 8th	(New Zealand); Hamilton; 11th	(Australia); Sydney; 9th	(Canada); Vancouver; 6th	(Hong Kong); Hong Kong; 6th	(France); Toulouse; 10th			9th	39
2023–24	(United Arab Emirates); Dubai; 4th	(South Africa); Cape Town; 6th	(Australia); Perth; 7th	(Canada); Vancouver; (bronze) rd	(United States); Los Angeles; 4th	(Hong Kong); Hong Kong; 6th	(Singapore); Singapore; 7th	(Spain); Madrid; 4th		League: 5th Grand Finals: 4th	80
2024–25	(United Arab Emirates); Dubai; 8th	(South Africa); Cape Town; 5th	(Australia); Perth; 4th	(Canada); Vancouver; 7th	(Hong Kong); Hong Kong; (bronze) rd	(Singapore); Singapore; (bronze) rd	(United States); Los Angeles; (bronze) rd			League: 4th Grand Finals: (bronze) rd	72
2025–26	(United Arab Emirates); Dubai; 6th	(South Africa); Cape Town; 6th	(Singapore); Singapore; (bronze) rd	(Australia); Perth; 5th	(Canada); Vancouver; 5th	(United States); New York; 7th	(Hong Kong); Hong Kong; 4th	(Spain); Valladolid; 4th	(France); Bordeaux	League: 5th Grand Finals: 4th	68 28

==== Totals ====
Tournaments	Played	Won	Lost	Drawn	Win percentage	Points Scored	Points Conceded
76	427	251	169	7	58.78%	8,345	6,162

Last updated: 17 March 2026.

== Players ==
=== Olympic Squads ===
Squad for the 2024 Summer Olympics.

Squad for the 2020 Summer Olympics.

Squad for the 2016 Summer Olympics.

=== Sevens Series player records ===
Most matches
Rank	Player	Matches
1	Bianca Farella	241
2	Kayla Moleschi	219
3	Ghislaine Landry	208
4	**Breanne Nicholas**	199
5	**Charity Williams**	176
6	Karen Paquin	152
7	Brittany Benn	150
8	**Olivia Apps**	143
9	Jen Kish	134
10	**Caroline Crossley**	131

Most points
Rank	Player	Points
1	Ghislaine Landry	1,356
2	Bianca Farella	840
3	**Charity Williams**	497
4	Brittany Benn	335
4	Karen Paquin	335
6	**Olivia Apps**	330
7	Julia Greenshields	294
8	**Breanne Nicholas**	293
9	Kayla Moleschi	253
10	Ashley Steacy	206

Most tries
Rank	Player	Tries
1	Bianca Farella	168
2	Ghislaine Landry	143
3	**Charity Williams**	99
4	Brittany Benn	67
4	Karen Paquin	67
6	Julia Greenshields	52
7	Kayla Moleschi	49
8	**Krissy Scurfield**	35
9	Jen Kish	34
10	**Olivia Apps**	30

Most conversions
Rank	Player	Conv
1	Ghislaine Landry	319
2	**Olivia Apps**	80
3	Breanne Nicholas	69
4	Ashley Steacy	53
5	Magali Harvey	40
6	Mandy Marchak	29
7	**Chloe Daniels**	27
8	Kelly Russell	23
9	Julia Greenshields	17
10	**Asia Hogan-Rochester**	10

Last updated: 9 June 2024.

Note: Bold indicates active in the 2024–25 season.

=== Award winners ===
The following Canada Sevens players have been recognised at the World Rugby Awards since 2013:

World Rugby Women's 7s Player of the Year
Year	Nominees	Winners
2013	Jen Kish	—
2017	Ghislaine Landry	—

World Rugby Women's 7s Dream Team
Year	No.	Player
2024	1.	Olivia Apps
