= 2021 World Rugby Women's Sevens Series =

- (Cancelled)
- Hosts: Canada (2 invitational events only)
- Date: 18–26 September 2021

The 2021 World Rugby Women's Sevens Series was a planned series of rugby sevens tournaments for national women's rugby sevens teams that was cancelled due to impact of the COVID-19 pandemic. Instead of an official season of the Women's Sevens Series, two invitational "Fast Four" tournaments were played in Canada.

== Teams ==
Following the cancellation of all official tournaments scheduled for the 2021 series, two invitational events were contested by the following teams:

- Canada
- Great Britain
- Mexico
- United States

Mexico replaced France, withdrew late due to travel issues.

== Tour venues ==
In July 2021, four tournaments had been planned for the women's tour but all were subsequently cancelled due to the impact of the COVID-19 pandemic.

- The Paris (October 2021) and Hong Kong (5–7 November 2021) events were cancelled on 5 August 2021.
- The Singapore (29–30 October 2021) and Cape Town (10–12 December 2021) events were cancelled on 3 September 2021.

Two invitational tournaments were played instead:

2021 Fast Four invitational tournaments
| Leg | Stadium | City | Dates | Winner |
|---|---|---|---|---|
| Vancouver | BC Place | Vancouver | 18–19 September 2021 | Great Britain |
| Edmonton | Commonwealth Stadium | Edmonton | 25–26 September 2021 | Great Britain |

== Tournaments ==
=== Vancouver ===
| Event | Winner | Score | Finalist |
|---|---|---|---|
| Final | Great Britain | 34–12 | United States |
| 3rd Place | Canada | 48–0 | Mexico |

=== Edmonton ===
| Event | Winner | Score | Finalist |
|---|---|---|---|
| Final | Great Britain | 22–5 | United States |
| 3rd Place | Canada | 63–5 | Mexico |

== See also ==
- 2021 World Rugby Sevens Series (for men)
- Rugby sevens at the 2020 Summer Olympics
