= Ireland women's national rugby sevens team =

Sevens national rugby team

Ireland
- Emblem: Shamrock
- Union: Irish Rugby Football Union
- Head coach: James Topping
- Captain: Megan Burns
First colours	Second colours

World Cup
- Appearances: 3
- Best result: 6th
- Website: www.irishrugby.ie

The Ireland women's national rugby sevens team participates in international competitions such as the World Rugby Women's Sevens Series, the Rugby World Cup Sevens, the Rugby Europe Women's Sevens and Rugby sevens at the Summer Olympics. Unlike the Ireland women's national rugby union team, the sevens team is a professional team with players contracted to the Irish Rugby Football Union.

== World Rugby Women's Sevens Series ==
Ireland first competed in the World Rugby Women's Sevens Series as an invited team in 2012–13. They entered the 2013 China Women's Sevens and won the Plate competition. After finishing as quarter-finalists in the 2013 Rugby World Cup Sevens, Ireland qualified to be a core team for 2013–14. Ireland did not participate in 2014–15 but returned as a core team in 2015–16 after finishing as runners up to Japan in a qualifying tournament hosted at UCD Bowl in August 2015. Ireland remained as a core team for 2016–17 and 2017–18. Ireland have never won a Cup at any of the Series tournaments but they have won Challenge Trophies, Plates and Bowls. Ireland's best performance in the Series came in 2016–17 when they finished ninth overall and gained their first ever wins against Fiji, England and France. In April 2017 Sene Naoupu scored three tries as Ireland won the Challenge Trophy at the 2017 Japan Women's Sevens, defeating Spain 26–7 in the final. In 2016 and 2017 they also won two successive Challenge Trophies at the Dubai Women's Sevens.

=== Season by season ===
Ireland at the World Series
Season	Rank	Points	Events	Best event	Most tries	Most points
2012–13	11th	12	1/4	5th (China)	Alison Miller (6)	Alison Miller (30)
2013–14	13th	11	5/5	9th (China])	Martina McCarthy (7)	Martina McCarthy (35)
2014–15	Did not participate					
2015–16	12th	11	5/5	9th (USA])	Murphy Crowe/Mulhall (9)	Lucy Mulhall (89)
2016–17	9th	34	6/6	7th (Canada)	A.L. Murphy Crowe (21)	A.L. Murphy Crowe (105)
2017–18	10th	29	5/5	6th (Canada)	A.L. Murphy Crowe (18)	A.L. Murphy Crowe (90)
2018–19	8th	41	6/6	4th (Sydney)	A.L. Murphy Crowe (35)	A.L. Murphy Crowe (175)
2019–20	10th	15	5/5	7th (USA)	A.L. Murphy Crowe (14)	A.L. Murphy Crowe (70)
2021–22	4th	74	6/6	2nd (Seville)	A.L. Murphy Crowe (36)	A.L. Murphy Crowe (180)
2022–23	5th	74	7/7	4th (Three events)	A.L. Murphy Crowe (30)	Lucy Mulhall (164)
2023–24 (League)	7th	66	7/7	1st (Perth)	A.L. Murphy Crowe (33)	A.L. Murphy Crowe (165)
2023–24 (Grand Final)	6th	—N/a	1/1	—N/a	A.L. Murphy Crowe (7)	A.L. Murphy Crowe (35)
Total	—N/a	367	54/63	1st (Perth)	A.L. Murphy Crowe (197)	A.L. Murphy Crowe (985)

== Tournaments ==
=== Rugby World Cup Sevens ===
Ireland made their Rugby World Cup Sevens debut at the 2013 tournament. They qualified after finishing sixth in the 2012 Sevens Women Grand Prix Series. The team was captained by Claire Molloy and they reached the quarter-finals, finishing seventh overall.

The Ireland women's sevens team and the Ireland women's national rugby union team has often used the same set of players. For example, the 2018 Women's Six Nations Championship squad included nine rugby sevens internationals. This has occasionally led to conflicts of interest. In February 2017 Sene Naoupu, Alison Miller and Hannah Tyrrell were controversially withdrawn from Ireland's 2017 Women's Six Nations Championship squad in order to represent the Ireland Sevens in the 2017 USA Women's Sevens. The reasoning behind this decision was that the Ireland Sevens were chasing a top eight finish in the 2016–17 World Rugby Women's Sevens Series in order to qualify for the 2018 Rugby World Cup Sevens. Ireland eventually finished ninth in the Series but subsequently qualified for the World Cup after finishing third in the 2017 Rugby Europe Women's Sevens Grand Prix Series.

Rugby World Cup Sevens
Year	Round	Position	Pld	W	L	D
(United Arab Emirates) 2009	Did not qualify					
(Russia) 2013	Plate Semifinalists	7th	5	2	3	0
(United States) 2018	5th Place Final	6th	4	2	2	0
(South Africa) 2022	7th Place Final	7th	4	2	2	0
Total	0 Titles	3/4	13	6	7	0

=== Rugby Europe Women's Sevens ===
Ireland first competed in the Rugby Europe Women's Sevens in 2006. Their best performances in the tournament were in 2016, 2017 and 2026 when they finished third on all three occasions.

=== Olympics ===
In their attempt to qualify for the 2016 Summer Olympics, Ireland competed in a series of qualifying tournaments including the 2015 Rugby Europe Women's Sevens Championships, the 2015 Rugby Europe Women's Sevens Olympic Repechage Tournament and the 2016 Rugby World Women's Sevens Olympic Repechage Tournament. However they were unsuccessful in their bid to qualify.

The team automatically qualified for the 2024 Summer Olympics on May 24, 2023, in a 10–5 win over Fiji.

Olympic Games record
Year	Round	Position	Pld	W	L	D
(Brazil) 2016	Did Not Qualify					
(Japan) 2020	Did Not Qualify					
(France) 2024	5th–8th place playoff	8th	6	1	5	0
Total	0 Titles	1/3	6	1	5	0

== Players ==
=== Current squad ===
All players who represented Ireland during the 2026 Rugby Europe Sevens Championship Series beginning July 2026.

Player	Age	Club/Province	Legs
Alana McInerney	25	UL Bohemian RFC/Munster	&
Alanna Fitzpatrick	21	Blackrock College RFC/Leinster	&
Amy Larn	21	Old Belvedere RFC/Leinster	&
Clare Gorman	24	Old Belvedere RFC/Leinster	&
Chisom Ugwueru	23	UL Bohemian RFC/Munster	& *
Kathy Baker	28	Blackrock College RFC/Leinster	&
Megan Burns	26	Blackrock College RFC/Leinster	&
Faith Oviawe	23	Railway Union RFC/Connacht	&
Katie Corrigan	20	Old Belvedere RFC/Leinster	&
Emily Lane	27	Blackrock College RFC/Munster	Croatia
Eve Higgins	27	Railway Union RFC/Leinster	Croatia
Robyn O'Connor	21	Old Belvedere RFC/Leinster	Croatia
Vicky Elmes Kinlan	23	Wicklow RFC/Leinster	Croatia
Stacey Flood	29	Railway Union RFC/Leinster	*
Kyah Coady	23	Treaty United (Football) / Connacht	Germany
Maggie Boylan	25	Blackrock College RFC/Leinster	Germany
Niamh Murphy		Galwegians RFC/Leinster	Germany
Lucia Linn	21	UL Bohemian RFC/Munster	Germany
*Stacey Flood withdrew before the start of Leg 2 in Croatia and was replaced by Chisom Uguweru

Coach: James Topping

FISU World University Championship in Stellenbosch, South Africa, from 4-6 September.

Name	Province
Heidi Lyons	Railway Union
Caoimhe McCormack	Railway Union
Faith Oviawe	Railway Union
Caitríona O'Hagan	Dungannon
Amy Larn	Old Belvedere
Lyndsay Clarke	Ennis
Alex Connor	Navan
Clare Gorman	Old Belvedere
Leah Irwin	Enniskillen
Niamh Murphy	Galwegians
Rola Olusola	Recruited from IRFU Combine
Chisom Ugwueru	UL Bohemian

== Honours ==
Cups

Australia Sevens

- Winners: 2024

Rugby Europe Women's Sevens
- Winners Split Leg 2026
Challenge Trophies

- Japan Women's Sevens Challenge Trophy
  - Winners: 2017
- Dubai Women's Sevens Challenge Trophy
  - Winners: 2016, 2017

Plates

- Rugby Europe Women's Sevens Championships Plate
  - Winners: 2013 ^{[Note 1]}, 2015 ^{[Note 2]}
- China Women's Sevens Plate
  - Winners: 2013
- London Women's Sevens Plate
  - Winners: 2013
- Amsterdam Women's Sevens Plate
  - Winners: 2012

Bowls

- China Women's Sevens Bowl
  - Winners: 2014
- USA Women's Sevens Bowl
  - Winners: 2016
- Hong Kong Women's Sevens Bowl
  - Winners: 2013

Notes

- ^1 The 2013 FIRA-AER Women's Sevens Grand Prix Series featured two tournaments. Ireland won the Plate at the Brive tournament.
- ^2 The 2015 Rugby Europe Women's Sevens Championships was effectively two tournaments. Ireland won the Plate at both tournaments.

== See also ==
- Ireland national rugby sevens team (men)
