= France women's national rugby sevens team =

France
- Union: French Rugby Federation
- Coach: Romain Huet
- Captain: Carla Neisen
Team kit	Change kit

World Cup Sevens
- Appearances: 3 (First in 2009)
- Best result: Runners-up (2018)

France women's national rugby sevens team represents France in the Rugby Europe Women's Sevens, World Rugby Sevens Series, Rugby World Cup Sevens and the Summer Olympic Games. They are currently the 2023 European Champions; they were also champions in 2007 and 2015. France has competed in the Summer Olympics since its debut at the 2016 Rio Olympics and were silver medalists at the 2020 Games.

They have been a core team in the Women's Sevens Series since the 2014–15 season. They have also competed in the Sevens World Cup since the inauguration of the women's tournament in 2009, and were silver medalists in 2018.

== History ==
=== Sevens World Cup ===
France competed in the inaugural Women's Sevens World Cup in Dubai in 2009. They finished at the top of their pool, despite losing to the Netherlands in their opening game. They were eliminated by the United States in the Cup quarter-finals, without having scored a single point. They finally finished in seventh place after losing to Canada in the Plate semi-finals.

=== Sevens Series debut ===
As the first edition of the Women's Sevens World Series commenced in the 2012–2013 season, France participated as an invitational team for two of the four tournaments.

=== 2013 Sevens World Cup ===
In 2013, France took part in their second World Cup at the Luzhniki Stadium in Moscow, Russia. They finished third in their pool behind Russia and England, with Russia surprising England to win the last match of the group stage. In the Bowl finals, France dominated Tunisia in the quarter-finals, before being eliminated by Fiji. They eventually finished in eleventh place overall.

=== Road to Rio ===
In order to qualify for the Rio Olympics, where rugby was making its return, France had to win the 2015 Grand Prix with a best combined result of two tournaments. After failing in the first stage in Kazan in the final against the Russians, the Les Bleues got their revenge in Brive in the final stage by beating Russia in the semi-final. They then won the final against Spain and qualified for the 2016 Olympics.

Les Bleues started their first Olympic Games with victories against Spain and Kenya, but lost to New Zealand and were placed second in their pool. They then lost in the quarter-finals of the medal play-offs against Canada, they met Spain again in the semi-final for fifth place and beat them. However, they lost to the United States in the final and finished in sixth place.

=== 2018 Sevens World Cup ===
They competed at the 2018 Rugby World Cup Sevens, their qualification being determined by their placement in the 2016–17 World Rugby Women's Sevens Series. They went undefeated on their way to the final, even beating Olympic champions Australia by 19–12 in the semi-finals, before succumbing to defending champions New Zealand in the finals, where they were defeated 29–0.

=== Tokyo Olympics ===
France qualified for the 2020 Summer Olympics in Tokyo, after winning the Final Olympic Qualification Tournament in Monaco. They went undefeated until the gold medal final, where they lost to New Zealand by 26–12.

== Tournament history ==
=== Summer Olympics ===
Olympic Games record
Year	Round	Position	Pld	W	L	D
(Brazil) 2016	Quarterfinals	6th	6	3	3	0
(Japan) 2020	Gold medal final	2nd place, silver medalist(s)	6	5	1	0
(France) 2024	Quarterfinals	5th	6	5	1	0
Total	0 Titles	3/3	18	13	5	0

=== Rugby World Cup Sevens ===
Rugby World Cup Sevens
Year	Round	Position	Pld	W	L	D
(United Arab Emirates) 2009	Plate Semifinalists	7th	5	2	3	0
(Russia) 2013	Bowl Semifinalists	11th	5	2	2	1
(United States) 2018	Final	2nd	4	3	1	0
(South Africa) 2022	Bronze final	3rd	4	3	1	0
Total	0 Titles	4/4	18	10	7	1

=== Rugby X Tournament ===
Rugby X Tournament
Year	Position	Pld	W	L	D
(England) 2019	3rd	2	1	1	0

=== Women's Sevens Series ===
Series	Season	Events	Position	Points
I	2012–13	2 / 4	12th	9
II	2013–14	3 / 5	8th	21
III	2014–15	6	6th	72
IV	2015–16	5	5th	60
V	2016–17	6	7th	60
VI	2017–18	5	3rd place, bronze medalist(s)	68
VII	2018–19	6	5th	70
VIII	2019–20	5	4th	70
–	2020–21	Cancelled due to impacts of the COVID-19 pandemic.		
IX	2021–22	6	2nd place, silver medalist(s)	84
X	2022–23	7	4th	92
XI	2023–24	8	(bronze) (League) (silver) (Grand Final)	104

== Players ==
=== Current squad ===
Squad named for the 2023 World Rugby HSBC Sevens Series in Vancouver from the 3–5 March.

Caps updated to the latest date: 5 March 2023

France Women 7's

#	Player	Position	Height	Weight	Date of birth	Matches	Points scored	Club
1	Séraphine Okemba	Left wing	1.77 m (5 ft 10 in)	78 kg (172 lb)	December 3, 1995	114	250	Lyon OU
3	Chloé Pelle	Tighthead Prop	1.62 m (5 ft 4 in)	70 kg (150 lb)	November 14, 1989	207	310	Rugby Club Chilly-Mazarin
4	Lou Noel	Tighthead Prop	1.64 m (5 ft 5 in)	60 kg (130 lb)	November 25, 2000	50	55	AC Bobigny 93 Rugby
5	Joanna Grisez	Left wing	1.65 m (5 ft 5 in)	56 kg (123 lb)	October 5, 1996	73	230	AC Bobigny 93 Rugby
6	Yolaine Yengo	Outside Centre	1.60 m (5 ft 3 in)	52 kg (115 lb)	April 24, 1993	67	147	Stade Rennais Rugby
8	Camille Grassineau	Left wing	1.65 m (5 ft 5 in)	58 kg (128 lb)	September 10, 1990	210	410	Stade Français Paris
9	Carla Neisen	Outside Centre	1.64 m (5 ft 5 in)	67 kg (148 lb)	March 8, 1996	139	155	Blagnac Rugby Féminin
10	Caroline Drouin	Fly Half	1.73 m (5 ft 8 in)	74 kg (163 lb)	July 7, 1996	95	225	Stade Rennais Rugby
13	Jade Ulutule	Fullback	1.63 m (5 ft 4 in)	63 kg (139 lb)	October 12, 1992	116	511	Stade Rennais Rugby
15	Chloé Jacquet	Inside Centre	1.66 m (5 ft 5 in)	58 kg (128 lb)	April 17, 2002	18	22	
28	Lili Dezou	Inside Centre	1.69 m (5 ft 7 in)	60 kg (130 lb)	July 8, 2004	24	32	Stade Toulousain
88	Iän Jason	Fullback	1.65 m (5 ft 5 in)	51 kg (112 lb)	January 18, 1997	63	77	Stade Toulousain

Coach: David Courteix
2022–23 World Rugby Women's Sevens Series

=== Award winners ===
The following France Sevens players have been recognised at the World Rugby Awards since 2013:

World Rugby Women's 7s Player of the Year
Year	Nominees	Winners
2021	Anne-Cécile Ciofani	Anne-Cécile Ciofani

World Rugby Women's 7s Dream Team
Year	No.	Player
2024	7.	Séraphine Okemba

== See also ==
- France Women's Sevens
