= Women's SVNS =

International series of tournaments in women's rugby sevens

HSBC SVNS
- Current season, competition or edition: 2025–26 SVNS
- Formerly: IRB Women's Sevens Challenge Cup (2011–2012); World Rugby Women's Sevens Series (2012–2023)
- Sport: Rugby sevens
- Founded: 2012; 14 years ago
- First season: 2012–13
- No. of teams: 8 (2025–26)
- Most recent champions: Series: New Zealand (2025–26); Grand Final: Australia (2026)
- Most titles: Series: New Zealand (10 titles); Grand Final: Australia (2 titles)
- Qualification: Challenger Series (until 2025); SVNS 2
- Broadcasters: List of broadcasters
- Level on pyramid: 1
- Website: www.svns.com/en

The World Rugby SVNS, known as the HSBC SVNS for sponsorship reasons, is a series of international rugby sevens tournaments for women's national teams run by World Rugby. The inaugural series was held in 2012–13 as the successor to the IRB Women's Sevens Challenge Cup held the previous season. The competition has been sponsored by banking group HSBC since 2015.

The series, the women's counterpart to the World Rugby Sevens Series, provides elite-level women's competition between rugby nations. As with the men's Sevens World Series, teams compete for the title by accumulating points based on their finishing position in each tournament.

== History ==
The first 2012–13 series consisted of four tournaments on three continents. The first two events were hosted by the United Arab Emirates (specifically Dubai) and the United States, both of which host events in the men's version. The other two events were hosted by China and the Netherlands.

For the second series in 2013–14, five tournaments took place; a sixth had initially been announced, but never materialized. All nations that hosted events in 2012–13 hosted in the second season, with the added event hosted by Brazil.

The series expanded to six events for 2014–15. The Dubai, Brazil, USA, and Netherlands events remained on the schedule. China was not on the 2014–15 schedule. New rounds of the series were launched in Canada (specifically in Greater Victoria) and London.

Logo 2015–16

Initially, the 2015–16 series was announced with only four events, with London and the Netherlands dropping from the schedule, but a fifth event was eventually added, hosted by France. Events in Australia and Japan were added in 2016–17. With the USA hosting the 2018 Rugby World Cup Sevens, the USA was not on the 2017–18 schedule.

The USA Women's Sevens returned to the schedule for the 2018–19 series, but the event was moved within the season to become the opening event. The same season saw three events move to new locations. First, the USA event moved from Las Vegas to the Denver suburb of Glendale, Colorado. The Australian Women's Sevens, as well as the country's corresponding event in the men's Sevens Series, moved within Sydney from Sydney Football Stadium to Sydney Showground Stadium. This was necessary because the Football Stadium was demolished, with an entirely new stadium to be built on the same site. Finally, the France Women's Sevens, originally set for Paris, was moved to Biarritz, with the date also being moved forward by two weeks. This change was promoted by both World Rugby and the French Rugby Federation (FFR) as "enabl[ing] the FFR to maximise the visibility, attendance and impact of hosting the final round of the record-breaking series."

== Tournaments ==
=== Current events ===
The World Rugby Women's Sevens Series expanded to eight tournaments in 2019–20. From 2020 to 2022, however, several of these events had to be cancelled due to impacts of the COVID-19 pandemic.

Event	Stadium	City	Joined	First held at current venue
(United Arab Emirates) Dubai	The Sevens Stadium	Dubai	2012–13	2012–13
South Africa	DHL Stadium	Cape Town	2019–20	2019–20
Singapore	National Stadium	Singapore	2023–24	2023–24
Australia	HBF Park	Perth	2016–17	2023–24
(United States) USA	Sports Illustrated Stadium	New York (Note: Physical location is Harrison, New Jersey.)	2023–24 (rejoined)	2025–26
Canada	BC Place	Vancouver	2014–15	2014–15
Hong Kong	Hong Kong Stadium	Hong Kong	2019–20	2024–25
Spain	Estadio José Zorrilla	Zorrilla	2021–22	2025–26
France	Stade Atlantique	Bordeaux	2015–16	2025–26

=== Former hosts of current events ===
Event	Stadium	City	First held	Last held
Australia	Sydney Football Stadium (Note: Most recently known for sponsorship reasons as Allianz Stadium; demolished and in process of replacement by a new stadium on the same site.)	Sydney	2016–17	2017–18
Australia	Sydney Showground Stadium (Note: Known for sponsorship reasons as Spotless Stadium when it hosted the series in 2018–19.)	Sydney	2018–19	
Australia	Sydney Football Stadium	Sydney	2022–23	
Australia	Western Sydney Stadium (Note: Known for sponsorship reasons as Bankwest Stadium Stadium when it hosted the series in 2019–20.)	Sydney	2018–20	
Canada	Westhills Stadium (Note: Known for sponsorship reasons as Starlight Stadium when it last hosted the series in 2021–22.)	Langford (Victoria)	2014–15	2021–22
(United States) USA	BBVA Stadium (Note: Known as BBVA Compass Stadium when it hosted the series in 2012–13.)	Houston	2012–13	
(United States) USA	Fifth Third Bank Stadium	Kennesaw (Atlanta)	2013–14	2015–16
(United States) USA	Sam Boyd Stadium	Whitney (Las Vegas)	2016–17 (Note: United States was not included the 2017–18 women's series due to its hosting of the 2018 Rugby World Cup Sevens instead (although it did host the corresponding men's Sevens Series event in that season).)	
(United States) USA	Infinity Park	Glendale (Denver)	2012–13	2019–20
Spain	Estadio Ciudad de Málaga	Málaga	2021–22	
Spain	Estadio de La Cartuja	Seville	2021–22	
Spain	Metropolitano Stadium	Madrid	2023–24	
France	Stade Gabriel Montpied	Clermont-Ferrand	2015–16	2016–17
France	Parc des Sports Aguiléra	Biarritz	2018–19	
France	Stade Jean-Bouin	Paris	2017–18	
France	Stade Ernest-Wallon	Toulouse	2021–22	2022–23

=== Previous events ===
Event	Stadium (Capacity)	City	Joined	Ended
China	Guangzhou University City Stadium	Guangzhou	2012–13	2013–14
(Brazil) São Paulo	Arena Barueri	Barueri (São Paulo)	2013–14	2015–16
(England) London	Twickenham Stoop	London	2014–15	
Japan	Mikuni World Stadium Kitakyushu	Kitakyushu	2016–17	2018–19
Netherlands	NRCA Stadium	Amsterdam	2012–13	2014–15
New Zealand	Waikato Stadium	Hamilton	2019–20	2022–23

=== Sponsorship ===
Unlike the men's Sevens Series, which has enjoyed title sponsorship by banking giant HSBC in recent years, the Women's Sevens Series did not have a title sponsor until 2015–16. HSBC is now the title sponsor of both the men's and women's series.

== Historical results ==
=== Results by season – Series ===
Summary of the top six placegetters for each series:

Series	Season	Rds	(gold) Champion	(silver) Second	(bronze) Third	Fourth	Fifth	Sixth
I	2012–13	4	^{New Zealand}_{^{(74 pts)}}	England	Canada	United States	Russia	Australia
II	2013–14	5	^{New Zealand}_{^{(96 pts)}}	Australia	Canada	England	Russia	Spain
III	2014–15	6	^{New Zealand}_{^{(108 pts)}}	Canada	Australia	England	United States	France
IV	2015–16	5	^{Australia}_{^{(94 pts)}}	New Zealand	Canada	England	France	United States
V	2016–17	6	^{New Zealand}_{^{(116 pts)}}	Australia	Canada	Fiji	Russia	United States
VI	2017–18	5	^{Australia}_{^{(92 pts)}}	New Zealand	France	Canada	United States	Russia
VII	2018–19	6	^{New Zealand}_{^{(110 pts)}}	United States	Canada	Australia	France	England
VIII	2019–20	5 (Note: The last three rounds of 2019–20, scheduled for Langford, Paris, and Hong Kong, were cancelled due to the impacts of the COVID-19 pandemic.)	^{New Zealand}_{^{(96 pts)}}	Australia	Canada	France	United States	Russia
The 2020–21 season was cancelled due to impacts of the COVID-19 pandemic.
Fast Four (Note: The 2021 World Rugby Women's Sevens Series was held as two invitational events and didn't count as a full series.)	2021	2	Great Britain	United States	Canada	Mexico	No Team	No Team
IX	2021–22	6	^{Australia}_{^{(80 pts)}}	France	Fiji (Note: Fiji 7s withdrew from the first two tournaments of the 2021–22 series following positive COVID-19 tests in their squad.)	Ireland	New Zealand (Note: New Zealand 7s did not attend the first four tournaments of the 2021–22 series due to travel-related restrictions from the COVID-19 pandemic.)	United States
X	2022–23	7	^{New Zealand}_{^{(138 pts)}}	Australia	United States	France	Ireland	Fiji
XI	2023–24	7	^{New Zealand}_{^{(126 pts)}}	Australia	France	United States	Canada	Fiji
XII	2024–25	6	^{New Zealand}_{^{(116 pts)}}	Australia	France	Canada	Japan	United States
XIII	2025–26	6	^{New Zealand}_{^{(118 pts)}}	Australia	United States	France	Canada	Fiji

=== Season placings by team ===
Tally of top six placings in the series for each team, updated after the 2025–26 season:

Team	Champion	Runner-up	Third	Fourth	Top-3 Apps	Top-6 Apps
New Zealand	10	2	1	–	11	12
Australia	3	7	1	1	10	12
France	–	1	4	2	4	9
Canada	–	1	6	2	8	10
United States	–	1	2	2	2	11
England	–	1	–	3	1	5
Fiji	–	–	1	1	1	5
Ireland	–	–	–	1	–	2
Russia	–	–	–	–	–	5
Spain	–	–	–	–	–	1
Japan	–	–	–	–	–	1

=== Top 6 placings by season – Grand Finals ===
Summary of the top six placegetters for each grand final:

	Location(s)	Champion	Second	Third	Fourth	Fifth	Sixth	Ref
2023–24	Madrid	Australia	France	New Zealand	Canada	United States	Ireland	
2024–25	Los Angeles	New Zealand	Australia	Canada	United States	Fiji	Great Britain	
2025–26	Hong Kong (Spain) Valladolid (France) Bordeaux	^{Australia}_{^{(58 pts)}}	New Zealand	Canada	United States	France	Japan	

== Format ==
Rugby sevens is a version of rugby union, invented in Scotland in the 19th century, with seven players a side on a normal-sized field.

Games are much shorter, generally lasting only seven minutes per half, and tend to be very fast-paced, open affairs. The game is both quicker and higher-scoring than 15-a-side rugby and the rules are simpler, which explains part of its appeal, and also gives players the space for superb feats of individual skill. Sevens is traditionally played in a two-day tournament format.

The women's series features 12 teams in each tournament: the remaining participants are invited on the basis of regional tournament rankings.

Each tournament uses a format similar to that of the men's series, adjusted for the lower number of teams, with pool play followed by three separate knockout tournaments.

== Core teams ==
Prior to the inaugural season, a group of "core teams" that are guaranteed places in all series events was announced. This concept is taken directly from the men's series. Unlike the men's series, which features 15 core teams as of the 2012–13 season, the women's series began with only six.

For the 2013–14 series, the number of core teams was increased to eight, all reached the quarter final from the 2013 Rugby World Cup Sevens:

Brazil was invited to participate in all events for the 2013–14 series. This was part of an IRB initiative to help jump-start women's rugby development in the country, which is set to host the 2016 Summer Olympics.

For the 2014–15 series, the number of core teams increased to 11, and qualification was extensively revamped, changing to a system more similar to that currently used in the men's World Series. The top seven teams in the 2013–14 series retained core team status. Four additional core teams were determined in a 12-team qualifying tournament held in Hong Kong on 12–13 September 2014. World Rugby did not initially announce full details of the qualification system for future series, but eventually determined that the top nine teams from the 2014–15 series would retain their status for 2015–16, with a world qualifier following in September 2015.

A combined Great Britain 7s team replaced England 7s as a core team for the 2022–23 series.

Core teams – World Rugby Women's Sevens Series
Series Team	I 12–13	II 13–14	III 14–15	IV 15–16	V 16–17	VI 17–18	VII 18–19	VIII 19–20	IX 21–22	X 22–23	XI 23–24	XII 24–25
Australia	•	•	•	•	•	•	•	•	•	•	•	•
Brazil					•			•	•	•	•	•
Canada	•	•	•	•	•	•	•	•	•	•	•	•
China			•				•					•
England	•	•	•	•	•	•	•	•	•			
Fiji			•	•	•	•	•	•	•	•	•	•
France			•	•	•	•	•	•	•	•	•	•
Great Britain										•	•	•
Ireland		•		•	•	•	•	•	•	•	•	•
Japan				•		•				•	•	•
Netherlands	•											
New Zealand	•	•	•	•	•	•	•	•	•	•	•	•
Russia		•	•	•	•	•	•	•	•			
South Africa			•								•	
Spain		•	•	•	•	•	•	•	•	•	•	•
United States	•	•	•	•	•	•	•	•	•	•	•	•
Total	6	8	11	11	11	11	11	11	11	11	12	12

Current Core Teams

#	Team	Core since	Best Series Finish (Last)
1	New Zealand	2012–13	1st (2024–25)
2	Australia	2012–13	1st (2021–22)
3	France	2014–15	2nd (2021–22)
4	United States	2012–13	2nd (2018–19)
5	Canada	2012–13	2nd (2014–15)
6	Fiji	2014–15	3rd (2021–22)
7	Great Britain	2022–23	7th (2022–23)
8	Japan	2022–23	5th (2024–25)

Key: *indicates that the team was invited

Former core teams

Team	Last season as core	Best Series finish (Last)
England	2021–22	4th (2015–16)
Russia	2021–22	5th (2016–17)
South Africa	2023–24	11th (2023–24)
Netherlands	2012–13	7th (2012–13)
Brazil	2024–25	9th (2024–25)
China	2024–25	10th (2024–25)
Ireland	2024–25	4th (2021–24)
Spain	2024–25	6th (2013–14)

=== Promotion and relegation ===
In 2019, World Rugby announced a plan to create a second-tier competition that would allow the best twelve sevens teams, from their region to compete in a similar style format to the Sevens Series for the potential of gaining promotion to the World Rugby Sevens Series and becoming a core team. This breaks from the usual format of promotion and relegation in the sevens series.

From 2017–18 series to 2018–19 series the promotion/relegation was as follows:

- One team is relegated and one team is promoted each year.
- The core team that finishes bottom of the table at the end of the season series is relegated.
- The team that wins the 12-team qualifying tournament at the Hong Kong Sevens is promoted.

From 2020 onwards the style of promotion/relegation will be as such:

- One team is relegated and one team is promoted each year.
- The core team that finishes bottom of the table at the end of the season series is relegated to the Challenger Series.
- Twelve teams will compete for promotion in the Challenger Series event.

Season	Core teams	Relegated (post-season)	Promoted (for the next season)
2012–13	6	Netherlands	Spain, Ireland, Russia
2013–14	8	Ireland	China, Fiji, France, South Africa
2014–15	11	China, South Africa	Ireland, Japan
2015–16	11	Japan	Brazil
2016–17	11	Brazil	Japan
2017–18	11	Japan	China
2018–19	11	China	Brazil
2019–20	11	None (Note: There was no relegation from the 2019–20 core teams due to the curtailed season. Therefore, Brazil, who would have been relegated as the lowest placed core team, retained core team status. The Challenger Series, was cancelled so therefore no team was promoted.)	
2021	11	Series Cancelled	
2021–22	11	Russia	Japan
2022–23	11	No Relegation	South Africa
2023–24	12	South Africa	China
2024–25	12	Brazil, China, Ireland, Spain	No Promotion

== Player awards by season ==
Season	Rounds	Most points	Most tries	Player of the Year
2012–13	4	(New Zealand) Portia Woodman (105)	(New Zealand) Portia Woodman (21)	(New Zealand) Kayla McAlister
2013–14	5	(Australia) Emilee Cherry (195)	(Australia) Emilee Cherry (33)	(Australia) Emilee Cherry
2014–15	6	(New Zealand) Portia Woodman (?)	(New Zealand) Portia Woodman (52)	(New Zealand) Portia Woodman
2015–16	5	(Canada) Ghislaine Landry (158)	(New Zealand) Portia Woodman (24)	(Australia) Charlotte Caslick
2016–17	6	(Canada) Ghislaine Landry (269)	(New Zealand) Michaela Blyde (40)	(New Zealand) Michaela Blyde
2017–18	5	(New Zealand) Portia Woodman (215)	(New Zealand) Portia Woodman (43)	(New Zealand) Michaela Blyde
2018–19	5	(New Zealand) Tyla Nathan-Wong (207)	(Ireland) Amee-Leigh Murphy Crowe (35)	(New Zealand) Ruby Tui
2019–20	5	(United States) Alev Kelter (171)	(New Zealand) Stacey Fluhler (31)	No award
The 2020–21 season was cancelled due to impacts of the COVID-19 pandemic.				(France) Anne-Cécile Ciofani
2021–22	6	(France) Jade Ulutule (226)	(Ireland) Amee-Leigh Murphy Crowe (36)	(Australia) Charlotte Caslick
2022–23	7	(Australia) Maddison Levi (286)	(Australia) Maddison Levi (37)	(New Zealand) Tyla Nathan-Wong
2023–24	-	-	-	-

== Points schedule ==
The overall winner of the series is determined by points gained from the standings across all events in the season. Twelve teams compete at each event.

Gold, silver and bronze medals were introduced for the top three placegetters at each event in 2016–17, alongside a Challenge Trophy for lower ranked teams the former Plate and Bowl trophies.

Place	Status	Points
1st place, gold medalist(s)	Cup winner and gold medalist	20
2nd place, silver medalist(s)	Cup runner-up and silver medalist	18
3rd place, bronze medalist(s)	3rd-place play-off winner and bronze medalist	16
4	3rd-place play-off loser	14
5	5th-place play-off winner	12
6	5th-place play-off loser	10
7	7th-place play-off winner	8
8	7th-place play-off loser	6
9	9th-place play-off winner	4
10	9th-place play-off loser	3
11	11th-place play-off winner	2
12	11th-place play-off loser	1

Tie-breaking: Should teams finish equal on series points at the end of the season, the tiebreakers are the same as those in the men's series:

1. Overall scoring differential in the season.
2. Total try count in the season.
3. If neither produces a winner, the teams are tied.

== See also ==
- Rugby sevens
- World Rugby Sevens Series (for men)
- Rugby World Cup Sevens
- Rugby sevens at the Summer Olympics
