= Spain women's national rugby sevens team =

Spain
- Union: Spanish Rugby Federation
- Coach: María Ribera
Team kit	Change kit

World Cup Sevens
- Appearances: 4 (First in 2009)
- Best result: 4th place (2013)

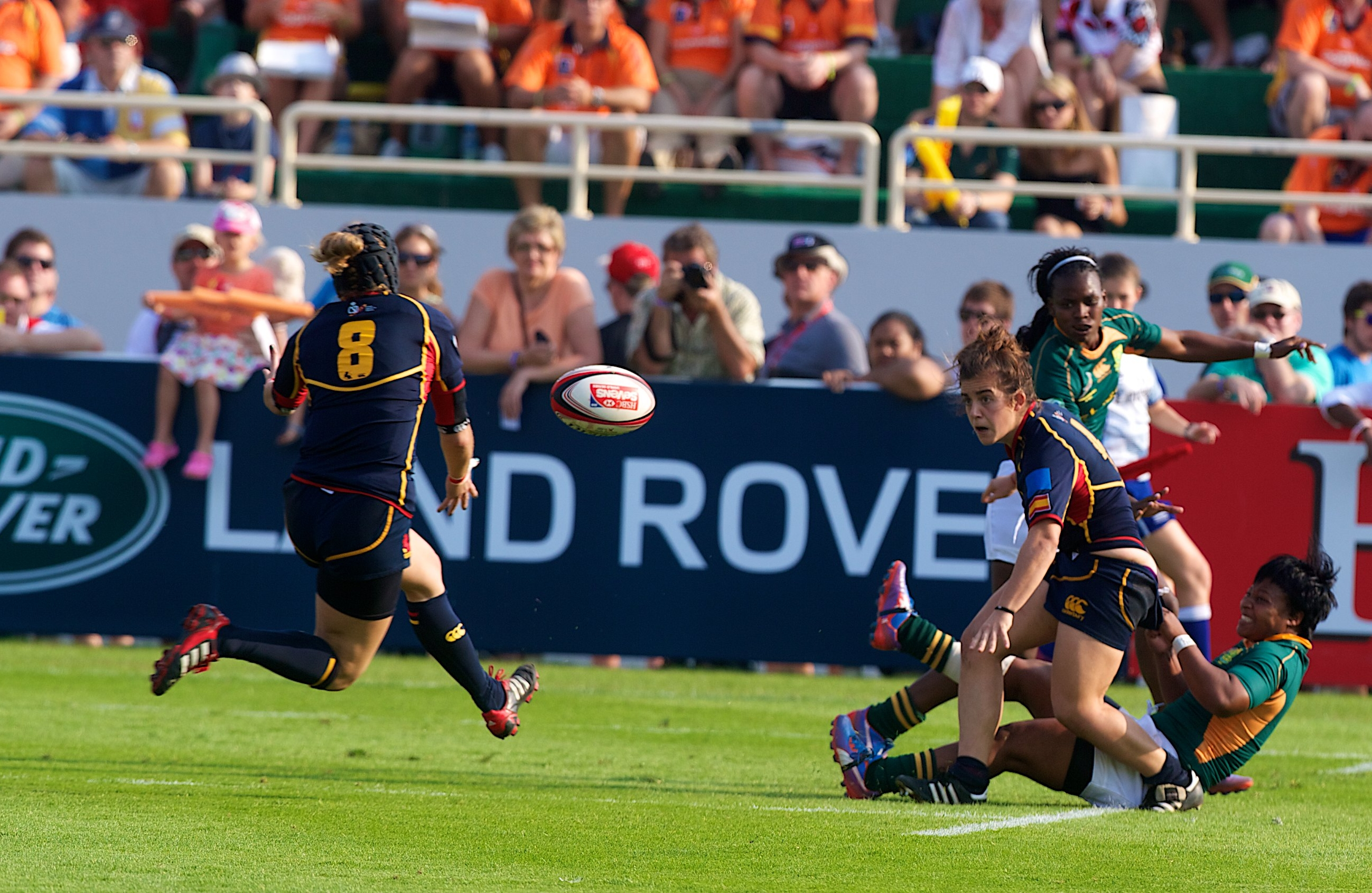
Spain playing South Africa in Dubai (2012)

Spain women's national rugby sevens team participates in the European Women's Sevens Series and finished second overall in the 2012 FIRA-AER Women's Sevens Grand Prix Series. Spain qualified for the 2016 Summer Olympics by winning the 2016 Women's Rugby Sevens Final Olympic Qualification Tournament in Dublin, Ireland. They defeated Russia in the finals 19–12.

== Tournament history ==
=== Summer Olympics ===
Olympic Games record
Year	Round	Position	Pld	W	L	D
(Brazil) 2016	Quarterfinals	7th	6	2	4	0
(Japan) 2020	did not qualify					
(France) 2024	did not qualify					
Total	0 Titles	1/1	6	2	4	0

=== World Cup Sevens ===
Rugby World Cup Sevens
Year	Round	Position	Pld	W	D	L
(United Arab Emirates) 2009	Plate Semi Finalist	7th	5	3	0	2
(Russia) 2013	Cup Semi Finalist	4th	6	2	1	3
(United States) 2018	Cup Quarter Finalist	5th	4	3	0	1
(South Africa) 2022	11th Place Final	12th	4	1	0	3
Total	0 titles	4/4	19	9	1	9

=== World Rugby Women's Sevens Series ===
World Rugby Women's Sevens Series
Season	Rounds	Position	Points
2012–13	2/4	9th	26
2013–14	5	6th	41
2014–15	6	9th	26
2015–16	5	9th	28
2016–17	6	10th	19
2017–18	5	7th	43
2018–19	6	9th	36
2019–20	5	9th	28
2021	Season was cancelled due to impacts of COVID-19 pandemic.		
2021–22	6	10th	26
2022–23	7	10th	28
2023–24	8	12th	17
2024–25	7	12th	14

== Team ==
The following players have been selected to represent Spain during the 2026–27 SVNS tournaments beginning in November 2026.

Note: Caps reflect the total number of SVNS events competed in as of the 2026 Dubai Sevens.

Player	Position	Date of birth (age)	Caps	Club/province
Paula Requena (es)	Forward	5 February 1997 (age 29)	?	Cisneros
Marta Cantabrana (es) (c)	Forward	14 January 2002 (age 24)	?	Majadahonda
Carmen Nwatu	Forward	5 August 2008 (age 18)	?	CAU Valencia
María García Gala (es)	Back	15 April 2000 (age 26)	?	Unattached
Carmen Miranda Miralles (es)	Back	21 July 2005 (age 21)	?	VRAC
Abril Camacho (es)	Back	8 June 2004 (age 22)	?	Sant Cugat
Marta Fresno (es)	Back	19 November 2003 (age 23)	?	Majadahonda
Amets Ulibarri	Back	?	?	Majadahonda
Jimena Blanco-Hortiguera	Back	1 December 2005 (age 20)	?	Majadahonda
Claudia Pérez Pérez (es)	Back	29 June 2004 (age 22)	?	Majadahonda
María del Mar Molina	Back	8 September 2001 (age 25)	?	Cisneros
Leire Aguilar	Back	2 July 2008 (age 18)	?	Santboiana
Martina Serrano	Back	29 October 2007 (age 19)	?	Stade Toulousain

== Statistics ==
=== Most caps ===
Caps as of 8 April 2024. Players in **bold** are still active.

#	Player	Matches
1	**Amaia Erbina**	197
2	**Olivia Fresneda**	168
3	**Beatriz Dominguez**	122
4	**Paula Requena**	114
5	**Eva Aguirre Diaz**	102
6	Bárbara Plà	97
7	Ángela del Pan	93

=== All-time Points in World Series ===
Caps as of 8 April 2024. Players in **bold** are still active.

#	Player	Points
**1**	Patricia García	**337**
**2**	**Amaia Erbina**	**220**
**3**	Berta García	**155**
**4**	Elisabet Martínez	**150**
**5**	Amalia Argudo	**107**

== See also ==
- Spain women's national rugby union team
