= England women's national rugby sevens team =

UK competitive sports team

England
- Union: Rugby Football Union
- Emblem: Red Rose
- Coach: Simon Middleton
- Captain: Michaela Staniford
Team kit	Change kit

World Cup Sevens
- Appearances: 2 (First in 2009)
- Best result: 5th place, 2009

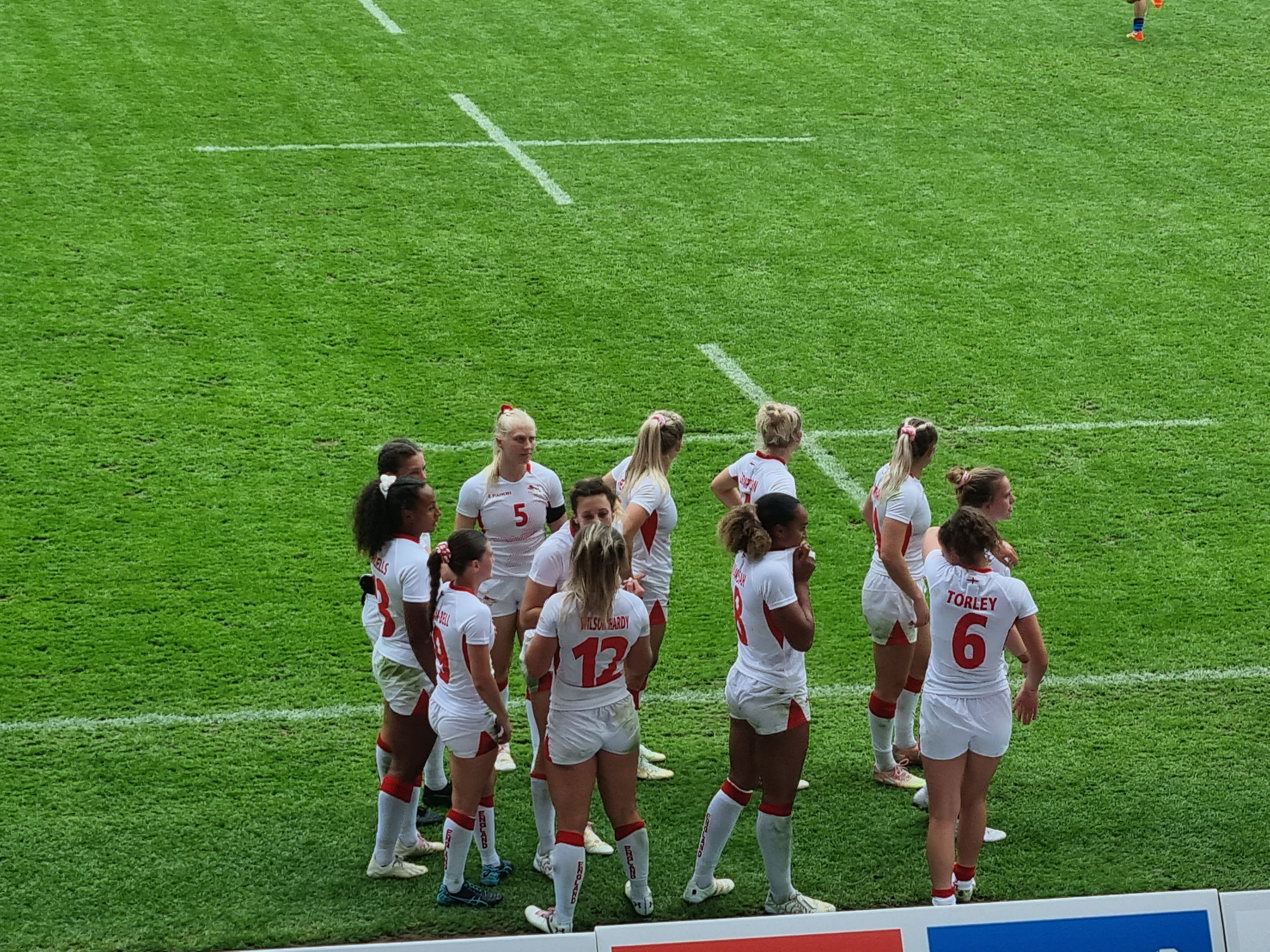
Team England at the 2022 Commonwealth Games.

The English women's national rugby sevens team has competed in the Hong Kong Women's Sevens tournaments since 1997. England are also one of six teams announced by the International Rugby Board as "core teams" that competed in all four rounds of the inaugural IRB Women's Sevens World Series in 2012–13. England won the bronze medal at the 2018 Commonwealth Games.

At the 2018 Rugby World Cup Sevens they lost to Ireland in the opening game of the tournament and were knocked out of the Championship Cup. They defeated Japan to win the Challenge Trophy Final and placed ninth overall. England, representing Great Britain, won the 2019 Rugby Europe Women's Sevens, thus qualifying for the 2020 Olympics.

== Tournament history ==
=== Rugby World Cup Sevens ===
Rugby World Cup Sevens
Year	Round	Position	Pld	W	L	D
(United Arab Emirates) 2009	Plate Winners	5th	6	5	1	0
(Russia) 2013	Plate Finalists	6th	6	3	3	0
(United States) 2018	Challenge Trophy Final	9th	4	3	1	0
(South Africa) 2022	7th-place Final	8th	4	1	3	0
Total	0 Titles	4/4	20	12	8	0

=== Commonwealth Games ===
Year	Round	Position	Pld	W	L	D
(Australia) 2018	Bronze medal match	3rd place, bronze medalist(s)	5	3	2	0
(England) 2022	5th Place Playoff	5th	5	3	2	0
Total	0 Titles	2/2	10	6	4	0

=== Rugby X Tournament ===
Rugby X Tournament
Year	Round	Position	Pld	W	L	D
(England) 2019	Finals	1st	2	2	0	0
Total	1 Title	1/1	2	2	0	0

== Honours ==
- Hong Kong Women's Sevens 2001 Cup Semi Finals
- Hong Kong Women's Sevens 2003 Cup Final
- Hong Kong Women's Sevens 2012 Cup Final
- 2019 Rugby X Tournament champions

== Players ==
=== Previous squads ===
Squad to the 2018 Rugby World Cup Sevens

Head coach: James Bailey

No.	Pos.	Player	Date of birth (age)	Union / Club
1	BK	Claire Allan	May 7, 1985 (aged 33)	Unattached
2	BK	Abbie Brown (c)	April 10, 1996 (aged 22)	Unattached
3	BK	Sarah McKenna	March 23, 1989 (aged 29)	Unattached
4	FW	Emily Scarratt	February 8, 1990 (aged 28)	Unattached
5	BK	Natasha Hunt	March 21, 1989 (aged 29)	Unattached
6	FW	Deborah Fleming	June 10, 1991 (aged 27)	Unattached
7	FW	Heather Fisher	June 13, 1984 (aged 34)	Unattached
8	FW	Victoria Fleetwood	April 13, 1990 (aged 28)	Unattached
9	FW	Alex Matthews	August 3, 1993 (aged 24)	Unattached
10	BK	Jess Breach	November 4, 1997 (aged 20)	Harlequins
11	BK	Holly Aitchison	September 13, 1997 (aged 20)	Unattached
12	FW	Amy Wilson-Hardy	September 13, 1991 (aged 26)	Unattached

Squad to IRB Women's Sevens Challenge Cup - 2012 London Sevens

• Rachael Burford • Heather Fisher • Sonia Green • Natasha Hunt • Sarah McKenna • Katherine Merchant • Isabelle Noel-Smith • Alice Richardson • Emily Scarratt • Michaela Staniford (C) • Joanne Watmore • Kay Wilson

=== Award winners ===
==== World Rugby Awards ====
The following England Sevens players have been recognised at the World Rugby Awards since 2013:

World Rugby Women's 7s Player of the Year
Year	Nominees	Winners
2016	Emily Scarratt	—

==== Rugby Players' Association Player of the Year ====
The following players have been voted as the RPA England 7s Player of the Year since 2018:

RPA Player of the Year
Year	Winners	Ref
2018	Alex Matthews	
2019	Alex Matthews (2)	
2020	Meg Jones	

== World Rugby Women's Sevens Series ==
- 2012–13 - 2nd
- 2013–14 - 4th
- 2014–15 - 4th
- 2015–16 - 4th
- 2016–17 - 8th

== See also ==
- England women's national rugby union team
