= 2018 in rugby union =

== Rugby sevens ==
=== International rugby sevens events ===
- January 6 – 14: 2018 Sudamérica Rugby Sevens in Punta del Este & Viña del Mar
  - South Africa Academy defeated France, 34–7, to win their first Sudamérica Rugby Sevens title.
  - Uruguay took third place and Chile took fourth place.
- July 12 – 14: 2018 World University Rugby Sevens Championship in (Namibia) Swakopmund
- July 20 – 22: 2018 Rugby World Cup Sevens at AT&T Park in (United States) San Francisco
  - Men: New Zealand defeated England, 33–12, to win their second consecutive and third overall Men's Rugby World Cup Sevens title.
  - Women: New Zealand defeated France, 29–0, to win their second consecutive Women's Rugby World Cup Sevens title.

=== 2018 Rugby Europe Sevens Grand Prix Series ===
- May 19 & 20: ERSS #1 in Moscow
  - Cup: Ireland; Plate: Russia; Bowl: Wales
- June 30 & July 1: ERSS #2 in (France) Marcoussis
  - Cup: Ireland; Plate: Portugal; Bowl: Poland
- July 7 & 8: ERSS #3 in Exeter
  - Cup: England; Plate: Wales; Bowl: Spain
- September 8 & 9: ERSS #4 in (Poland) Łódź (final)
  - Cup: Ireland; Plate: Germany; Bowl: Portugal

=== 2017–18 World Rugby Sevens Series ===
- December 1 & 2, 2017: WRSS #1 in (United Arab Emirates) Dubai
  - Cup: South Africa; Plate: Australia; Bowl: France; Shield: Wales
- December 9 & 10, 2017: WRSS #2 in (South Africa) Cape Town
  - Cup: New Zealand; Plate: Fiji; Bowl: Australia; Shield: Kenya
- January 26 – 28: WRSS #3 in Sydney
  - Cup: Australia; Plate: New Zealand; Bowl: France; Shield: Canada
- February 3 & 4: WRSS #4 in (New Zealand) Hamilton
  - Cup: Fiji; Plate: Samoa; Bowl: United States; Shield: France
- March 2 – 4: WRSS #5 in Las Vegas
  - Cup: United States; Plate: New Zealand; Bowl: France; Shield: Samoa
- March 10 & 11: WRSS #6 in (Canada) Vancouver
  - Cup: Fiji; Plate: England; Bowl: Scotland; Shield: Samoa
- April 6 – 8: WRSS #7 in Hong Kong
  - Cup: Fiji; Plate: Argentina; Bowl: France; Shield: Wales
- April 28 & 29: WRSS #8 in National Stadium, Singapore
  - Cup: Fiji; Plate: New Zealand; Bowl: United States; Shield: Japan
- June 2 & 3: WRSS #9 in (England) London
  - Cup: Fiji; Plate: New Zealand; Bowl: Kenya; Shield: Samoa
- June 8 – 10: WRSS #10 (final) in (France) Paris
  - Cup: South Africa; Plate: Fiji; Bowl: Argentina; Shield: Kenya

=== 2017–18 World Rugby Women's Sevens Series ===
- November 30 & December 1, 2017: WRWSS #1 in (United Arab Emirates) Dubai
  - Cup: Australia; Plate: New Zealand; Bowl: Ireland
- January 26 – 28: WRWSS #2 in Sydney
  - Cup: Australia; Plate: France; Bowl: England
- April 21 & 22: WRWSS #3 in (Japan) Kitakyushu
  - Cup: New Zealand; Plate: Russia; Bowl: United States
- May 12 & 13: WRWSS #4 in Langford, British Columbia
  - Cup: New Zealand; Plate: Canada; Bowl: Japan
- June 8 – 10: WRWSS #5 (final) in (France) Paris
  - Cup: New Zealand; Plate: United States; Bowl: Ireland

== Rugby union ==
=== National teams ===
- October 28, 2017 – April 14: (Czech Republic) / (Moldova) // (Poland) // 2017–18 Rugby Europe Trophy
  - Champions: Portugal; Second: Netherlands; Third: Switzerland
- January 27 – March 3: / (Brazil) / (Canada) / (Chile) // 2018 Americas Rugby Championship
  - Champions: United States; Second: Argentina XV; Third: Uruguay
- February 2 – March 16: /// (Italy) / (Scotland) / (Wales) 2018 Six Nations Under 20 Championship
  - Champions: France; Second: England; Third: Ireland
- February 2 – March 18: /// (Italy) / (Scotland) / (Wales) 2018 Women's Six Nations Championship
  - Champions: France; Second: England; Third: Ireland
- February 3 – March 17: (England) / (France) // (Italy) // 2018 Six Nations Championship
  - Champions: Ireland; Second: Wales; Third: Scotland
- February 10 – March 18: (Belgium) / (Georgia (country)) / (Germany) // (Russia) / 2018 Rugby Europe Championship
  - Champions: Georgia; Second: Romania; Third: Spain
- April 28 – June 2: // 2018 Asia Rugby Championship
  - Champions: Hong Kong; Second: South Korea; Third: Malaysia
- May 30 – June 17: 2018 World Rugby Under 20 Championship
  - France defeated England, 33–25, to win their first World Rugby Under 20 Championship title.
  - South Africa took third place.
- June 16 – August 18: / (Morocco) // (Tunisia) // (Zimbabwe) 2018 Africa Gold Cup
  - Champions: Namibia; Second: Kenya; Third: Uganda
- August 18 - October 6: 2018 Rugby Championship
  - Champions: New Zealand; Second: South Africa; Third: Australia; Fourth: Argentina
- November 16 – 24: 2018 Oceania Rugby Women's Championship in Fiji

=== Club teams ===
- August 26, 2017 – June 2: (France) 2017–18 Top 14
  - Castres defeated Montpellier 29–13 in the final to win their fifth Top 14 title.
- September 1, 2017 – May 26:
  - (England) 2017–18 Aviva Premiership
    - Saracens defeated reigning champion Exeter Chiefs 27–10 in the final to win their third title in four years and fourth overall.
  - (Ireland) / (Italy) / (Scotland) / (South Africa) / (Wales) 2017–18 Pro14
    - (Ireland) Leinster defeated defending champion (Wales) Scarlets 40–32 in the final for the inaugural title of the Pro14 era and Leinster's fifth since Pro14 launched in 2001 as the Celtic League.
- October 12, 2017 – May 11: 2017–18 European Rugby Challenge Cup
  - (Wales) Cardiff Blues defeated (England) Gloucester 31–30 in the final at Bilbao for their second Challenge Cup crown.
- October 13, 2017 – May 12: 2017–18 British and Irish Cup
  - (England) Ealing Trailfinders defeated (Ireland) Leinster A 22–7 to win their first British and Irish Cup title.
- October 13, 2017 – May 12: 2017–18 European Rugby Champions Cup
  - (Ireland) Leinster defeated (France) Racing 92 15–12 in the final at Bilbao for their first title in the Champions Cup era and fourth overall European club championship.
- January 13 – May 12: 2017–18 European Rugby Continental Shield
  - (Russia) Enisey-STM defeated (Germany) Heidelberger RK 24–20 in the final. Both finalists had been set to qualify for the 2018–19 European Rugby Challenge Cup, with Heidelberg to become the first German side ever to participate in that competition. However, Heidelberg were barred from the Challenge Cup due to Hans-Peter Wild's ownership of both this club and French side Stade Français.
- November 3, 2017 – March 18: (England) / (Wales) 2017–18 Anglo-Welsh Cup
  - (England) Exeter Chiefs defeated fellow English team Bath 28–11 to win their second Anglo-Welsh Cup title. This was also the final Anglo-Welsh Cup, as the Welsh Rugby Union pulled out of the competition in favour of a dedicated U-23 competition. For the English sides, it will be replaced by the Premiership Rugby Cup from 2018 to 2019.
- February 17 – August 4: (Argentina) / (Australia) / (Japan) / (New Zealand) / (South Africa) 2018 Super Rugby season
  - The (New Zealand) Crusaders defeated the (South Africa) Lions, 37–18, to win their second consecutive and ninth overall Super Rugby title.
- April 21 - July 7: (United States) 2018 Major League Rugby season (inaugural season)
  - Seattle Seawolves defeated Glendale Raptors
- August 17 – October 27: (South Africa) 2018 Currie Cup Premier Division
  - The Sharks defeated the Western Province, 17–12, to win their eighth Currie Cup title.
- August 17 – October 27: (New Zealand) 2018 Mitre 10 Cup
  - Team Auckland defeated team Canterbury, 40–33 at extra time, to win their second Mitre 10 Cup title.
- September 1 – October 27: (Australia) / (Fiji) 2018 National Rugby Championship
  - (Fiji) Fijian Drua defeated (Australia) Queensland Country, 36–26, to win their first National Rugby Championship title.

== See also ==
- 2018 in sports
