= 2018 Rugby World Cup Sevens – Women's tournament =

Tournament details
- Venue: AT&T Park
- Dates: 20 – 21 July 2018
- No. of nations: 16

Final positions
- Champions: New Zealand
- Runner-up: France

Tournament statistics
- Matches played: 32
- Tries scored: 199 (average 6.22 per match)
- Top scorer(s): Michaela Blyde (45)
- Most tries: Michaela Blyde (9)

The women's tournament in the 2018 Rugby World Cup Sevens was held at AT&T Park in San Francisco alongside the men's tournament in which the teams competed for the Women's Rugby Sevens World Cup.

== Format ==
Unlike previous editions, the tournament was played for the first time in a knock-out only format.

- Teams in the Championship Cup competed for the Women's Rugby Sevens World Cup trophy and bronze medals.
- Losing teams in the Championship Cup Quarter-finals competed for 5th Place.
- Losing teams in the Championship Cup Round of 16 (first round) competed for the Challenge Trophy and 13th Place.
- All teams played four matches.

== Teams ==
Africa	North America	South America	Asia	Europe	Oceania
Automatic qualification
	Canada; United States			Spain	New Zealand
2016–17 World Series
				France; Russia	Australia; Fiji
Regional Qualifiers
South Africa	Mexico	Brazil	China; Japan	England; Ireland	Papua New Guinea

== Draw ==
The sixteen teams were seeded as follows:

- The ten core teams of the 2016–17 World Rugby Women's Sevens Series and the 2017–18 World Rugby Women's Sevens Series were seeded according to their accumulated scores from the former series alongside the 2017 Dubai Women's Sevens and 2018 Sydney Women's Sevens.
- Through becoming a 2017–18 core team, Japan was seeded 11th.
- The remaining five were determined through the teams' ranking performance in the 2018 Hong Kong Women's Sevens.

2017–18 Core Team Seeding
Pos	Event Team	2016–17	Dubai	Sydney	Points total
1	New Zealand	116	12	18	146
2	Australia	100	20	20	140
3	Canada	98	14	16	128
4	Russia	66	16	14	96
5	United States	62	18	6	86
6	France	60	10	12	82
7	Fiji	66	2	3	71
8	England	37	6	4	47
9	Ireland	34	4	8	46
10	Spain	19	8	10	37
11	Japan	New core team			

2018 Hong Kong Women's Sevens seeding
Pos	Team	Round	Record
12	China	Winner	6–0
13	South Africa	Final	4–2
14	Brazil	Quarterfinal	2–2
15	Papua New Guinea	Quarterfinal	1–3
16	Mexico	Pool stage	0–3

== Match officials ==
World Rugby announced a panel of nine match officials for the women's tournament.

- Alhambra Nievas (Spain)
- Joy Neville (Ireland)
- Sara Cox (England)
- Adam Jones (Wales)
- Ben Crouse (South Africa)
- Sakurako Kawasaki (Japan)
- Hollie Davidson (Scotland)
- Rebecca Mahoney (New Zealand)
- Beatrice Benvenuti (Italy)

== Tournament ==
=== 13th Place ===
Semi-finals
21 July 2018 – 11:28 – AT&T Park
Mexico (16)	0
South Africa (13)	34
21 July 2018 – 11:50 – AT&T Park
Brazil (14)	15
Papua New Guinea (15)	12

13th Place Final
21 July 2018 – 18:02 – AT&T Park
South Africa (13)	0
Brazil (14)	22
15th Place
21 July 2018 – 17:40 – AT&T Park
Mexico (16)	0
Papua New Guinea (15)	32

Matches

Semi-finals

21 July 2018	(16) Mexico	0–34	South Africa (13)	AT&T Park
11:28				Referee: Beatrice Benvenuti (Italy)

21 July 2018	(14) Brazil	15–12	Papua New Guinea (15)	AT&T Park
11:50				Referee: Sakurako Kawasaki (Japan)

15th Place

21 July 2018	(16) Mexico	0–32	Papua New Guinea (15)	AT&T Park
17:40				Referee: Ben Crouse (South Africa)

13th Place Final

21 July 2018	(13) South Africa	0–22	Brazil (14)	AT&T Park
18:02				Referee: Sakurako Kawasaki (Japan)

=== Challenge Trophy ===
Quarter-finals
20 July 2018 – 16:02 – AT&T Park
England (8)	59
Mexico (16)	0
20 July 2018 – 17:08 – AT&T Park
China (12)	29
South Africa (13)	5
20 July 2018 – 16:46 – AT&T Park
Japan (11)	19
Brazil (14)	14
20 July 2018 – 16:24 – AT&T Park
Fiji (7)	43
Papua New Guinea (15)	0

Semi-finals
21 July 2018 – 12:12 – AT&T Park
England (8)	38
China (12)	0
21 July 2018 – 12:34 – AT&T Park
Japan (11)	15
Fiji (7)	14

Challenge Trophy Final
21 July 2018 – 18:46 – AT&T Park
England (8)	31
Japan (11)	5
11th Place
21 July 2018 – 18:24 – AT&T Park
China (12)	0
Fiji (7)	38

Matches

Quarter-finals

20 July 2018	(8) England	59–0	Mexico (16)	AT&T Park
16:02				Referee: Rebecca Mahoney (New Zealand)

20 July 2018	(7) Fiji	43–0	Papua New Guinea (15)	AT&T Park
16:24				Referee: Ben Crouse (South Africa)

20 July 2018	(11) Japan	19–14	Brazil (14)	AT&T Park
16:46				Referee: Beatrice Benvenuti (Italy)

20 July 2018	(12) China	29–5	South Africa (13)	AT&T Park
17:08				Referee: Sakurako Kawasaki (Japan)

Semi-finals

21 July 2018	(8) England	38–0	China (12)	AT&T Park
12:12				Referee: Rebecca Mahoney (New Zealand)

21 July 2018	(11) Japan	15–14	Fiji (7)	AT&T Park
12:34				Referee: Ben Crouse (South Africa)

11th Place

21 July 2018	(12) China	0–38	Fiji (7)	AT&T Park
18:24				Referee: Beatrice Benvenuti (Italy)

Challenge Trophy Final

21 July 2018	(8) England	31–5	Japan (11)	AT&T Park
18:46				Referee: Adam Jones (Wales)

=== 5th Place ===
Semi-finals
21 July 2018 – 12:56 – AT&T Park
Ireland (9)	20
Russia (4)	15
21 July 2018 – 13:18 – AT&T Park
Canada (3)	14
Spain (10)	26

5th Place Final
21 July 2018 – 19:30 – AT&T Park
Ireland (9)	7
Spain (10)	12
7th Place
21 July 2018 – 19:08 – AT&T Park
Russia (4)	10
Canada (3)	22

Matches

Semi-finals

21 July 2018	(9) Ireland	20–15	Russia (4)	AT&T Park
12:56				Referee: Hollie Davidson (Scotland)

21 July 2018	(3) Canada	14–26	Spain (10)	AT&T Park
13:18				Referee: Adam Jones (Wales)

7th Place

21 July 2018	(4) Russia	10-22	Canada (3)	AT&T Park
19:08				Referee: Hollie Davidson (Scotland)

5th Place Final

21 July 2018	(9) Ireland	7–12	Spain (10)	AT&T Park
19:30				Referee: Rebecca Mahoney (New Zealand)

=== Championship Cup ===
Round of 16
20 July 2018 – 12:12 – AT&T Park
England (8)	14
Ireland (9)	19
20 July 2018 – 11:50 – AT&T Park
New Zealand (1)	57
Mexico (16)	0
20 July 2018 – 12:34 – AT&T Park
United States (5)	38
China (12)	7
20 July 2018 – 10:44 – AT&T Park
Russia (4)	24
South Africa (13)	14
20 July 2018 – 10:22 – AT&T Park
France (6)	33
Japan (11)	7
20 July 2018 – 11:06 – AT&T Park
Canada (3)	43
Brazil (14)	19
20 July 2018 – 10:00 – AT&T Park
Fiji (7)	12
Spain (10)	19
20 July 2018 – 11:28 – AT&T Park
Australia (2)	34
Papua New Guinea (15)	5

Quarter-finals
20 July 2018 – 17:30 – AT&T Park
Ireland (9)	0
New Zealand (1)	45
20 July 2018 – 18:36 – AT&T Park
United States (5)	33
Russia (4)	17
20 July 2018 – 18:14 – AT&T Park
France (6)	24
Canada (3)	19
20 July 2018 – 17:52 – AT&T Park
Spain (10)	0
Australia (2)	34

Semi-finals
21 July 2018 – 13:40 – AT&T Park
New Zealand (1)	26
United States (5)	21
21 July 2018 – 14:02 – AT&T Park
France (6)	19
Australia (2)	12

Championship Cup Final
21 July 2018 – 20:14 – AT&T Park
New Zealand (1)	29
France (6)	0
Bronze Medal Match
21 July 2018 – 19:52 – AT&T Park
United States (5)	14
Australia (2)	24

Matches

Round of 16

20 July 2018	(7) Fiji	12–19	Spain (10)	AT&T Park
10:00	Try: Cumu 4'c Ravisa 12'm Con: Riwai (1/2) 4'		Try: Plà 2'c Bravo 6'm Martínez 8'c Con: García (2/3) 3', 8'; Cards: Erbina (yellow card) 14'	Referee: Joy Neville (Ireland)

20 July 2018	(6) France	33–7	Japan (11)	AT&T Park
10:22	Try: Izar 1'c Amédée 4'm Guerin 6'c Ciofani 11'c Bertrand 14'c Con: Amédée (2/2) 1', 6', 11'; Drouin (1/1) 14'; Izar (0/1)		Try: Otake 7'c Con: Okuroda (1/1) 7'	Referee: Ben Crouse (South Africa)

20 July 2018	(4) Russia	24–14	South Africa (13)	AT&T Park
10:44	Try: Mikhaltsova 3'm Shestakova 5'c Lushina 7'c Perestiak 14'm Con: Lushina (2/4) 5', 7'		Try: Jordaan 9'c Latsha 12'c Con: Jordaan (2/2) 9', 12'; Cards: Roos (yellow card) 4'	Referee: Rebecca Mahoney (New Zealand)

20 July 2018	(3) Canada	43–19	Brazil (14)	AT&T Park
11:06	Try: Benn 0'c Moleschi 2'c Greenshields 6'm Kaljuvee 7'm Farella 9'c Buisa 13'c Watcham-Roy 14'c Con: Landry (3/5) 0', 3', 9'; Nicholas (1/2) 13'		Try: Silva 4'c, 8'c Araújo 12'm Con: Cerullo (1/1) 5', 8'; Kochhann (0/1)	Referee: Adam Jones (Wales)

20 July 2018	(2) Australia	34–5	Papua New Guinea (15)	AT&T Park
11:28	Try: Pelite 1'm Cherry 3'm Tonegato 4'm Caslick (2) 9'c, 11'c Green 13'c Con: Cherry (2/2) 9', 12'; Williams (0/3); McGregor (0/1)		Try: Garesa 7'm Con: Lavai (0/1)	Referee: Sakurako Kawasaki (Japan)

20 July 2018	(1) New Zealand	57–0	Mexico (16)	AT&T Park
12:12	Try: Woodman (2) 1'm, 7'c Blyde (2) 4'm, 7'c Goss (3) 5'c, 12'c, 13'm Brazier 9'c Waaka 11'c Con: Nathan-Wong (6/8) 6', 7', 8', 9', 11', 12'; Willison (0/1)			Referee: Beatrice Benvenuti (Italy)

20 July 2018	(8) England	14–19	Ireland (9)	AT&T Park
12:12	Try: Scarratt 6'c Matthews 13'c Con: Aitchison (2/2) 6', 13'		Try: Baxter 2'm Murphy-Crowe (2) 8'c, 10'c Con: Mulhall (2/3) 8', 11'	Referee: Hollie Davidson (Scotland)

20 July 2018	(5) United States	38–7	China (12)	AT&T Park
12:34	Try: Tapper 0'c Thomas 4'c Doyle 5'm Zackary 8'm Emba (2) 10'c, 13'c Con: Heavirland (4/6) 0', 5', 10', 14'		Try: Chen 2'c Con: Yu X 3'	Referee: Sara Cox (England)

Quarter-finals

20 July 2018	(9) Ireland	0–45	New Zealand (1)	AT&T Park
17:30				Referee: Alhambra Nievas (Spain)

20 July 2018	(10) Spain	0–34	Australia (2)	AT&T Park
17:52				Referee: Hollie Davidson (Scotland)

20 July 2018	(6) France	24–19	Canada (3)	AT&T Park
18:14	Try: Mayans 2'c Guérin (2) 5'm, 10'c Drouin 14'm Con: Amédée (1/2) 2'; Izar (1/2) 10'		Try: Landry 7'c Williams 8'c Farella 12'm Con: Landry (2/3) 7', 9'	Referee: Sara Cox (England)

20 July 2018	(5) United States	33–17	Russia (4)	AT&T Park
18:36	Try: Tapper (2) 2'c, 4'c Gustaitis 6'c Maher 13'c Emba 14'c Con: Heavirland (4/5) 2', 4', 6', 13'; Cards: Heavirland (yellow card) 7'		Try: Khamidova 2'm Mikhaltsova 10'c Noritsina 12'c Con: Lushina (1/3) 10'	Referee: Joy Neville (Ireland)

Semi-finals

21 July 2018	(1) New Zealand	26–21	United States (5)	AT&T Park
13:40				Referee: Hollie Davidson (Scotland)

21 July 2018	(6) France	19–12	Australia (2)	AT&T Park
14:02				Referee: Rebecca Mahoney (New Zealand)

Bronze Medal Match

21 July 2018	(5) United States	14–24	Australia (2)	AT&T Park
19:52				Referee: Alhambra Nievas (Spain)

Championship Cup Final

21 July 2018	(1) New Zealand	29–0	France (6)	AT&T Park
20:14	Try: Blyde (3) 2'm, 13'c, 14'c Woodman 6'm Nathan-Wong 7'm Con: Nathan-Wong (2/5) 13', 14'			Referee: Sara Cox (England)

2018 Rugby World Cup Sevens Women's winners

New Zealand
2nd title

== Tournament placings ==
Place	Team
1st place, gold medalist(s)	New Zealand
2nd place, silver medalist(s)	France
3rd place, bronze medalist(s)	Australia
4	United States
5	Spain
6	Ireland
7	Canada
8	Russia

Place	Team
9	England
10	Japan
11	Fiji
12	China
13	Brazil
14	South Africa
15	Papua New Guinea
16	Mexico

== Player scoring ==
Tries scored
Rank	Player	Tries
1	Michaela Blyde	9
2	Naya Tapper	7
3	Evania Pelite	6
3	Portia Woodman	6
5	Raijieli Daveua	5
5	Ellia Green	5
5	Bianca Silva	5

Points scored
Rank	Player	Points
1	Michaela Blyde	47
2	Tyla Nathan-Wong	37
3	Holly Aitchison	36
4	Naya Tapper	35
5	Ghislaine Landry	31

Source: World Rugby

== See also ==
- 2018 Rugby World Cup Sevens – Men's tournament
