= 2018 France Women's Sevens =

- Women's Sevens Series VI
- Host nation: France
- Date: 8–10 June 2018

Cup
- Champion: New Zealand
- Runner-up: Australia
- Third: Canada

Challenge Trophy
- Winner: Ireland

Tournament details
- Matches played: 34
- Tries scored: 201 (average 5.91 per match)
- Most points: Alev Kelter (40); Michaela Blyde (40)
- Most tries: Michaela Blyde (8)

The 2018 France Women's Sevens was the final event of the 2017–18 World Rugby Women's Sevens Series and the third edition of the France Women's Sevens. The tournament was held between 8–10 June 2018 at Stade Jean-Bouin, Paris alongside the men's tournament.

== Teams ==
The eleven core teams will be participating in the tournament, along with one invited team, Wales.

- Australia
- Canada
- England
- Fiji
- France
- Ireland
- Japan
- New Zealand
- Russia
- Spain
- United States
- Wales

== Pool stages ==
All times in Central European Summer Time (UTC+02:00). The games as scheduled are as follows:

=== Pool A ===
Team	Pld	W	D	L	PF	PA	PD	Pts
New Zealand	3	3	0	0	95	19	+76	9
England	3	2	0	1	88	48	+40	7
Ireland	3	1	0	2	36	53	–17	5
Wales	3	0	0	3	24	123	–99	3

8 June 2018	New Zealand	24–12	England	Stade Jean-Bouin, Paris
14:00	Try: Blyde 1'm, 7'm Woodman 11'c, 13'c Con: Willison (2/2) 11', 13'; Nathan-Wong (0/2); Cards: Tui (yellow card) 12' to 14'		Try: McKenna 4'm Scarratt 7'c Con: Scott (1/2) 8'	Referee: Joy Neville (Ireland)

8 June 2018	Ireland	24–5	Wales	Stade Jean-Bouin, Paris
14:22	Try: Flood 3'c, 11'm Fitzhenry 7'm Murphy-Crowe 9'c Con: Mulhall (2/4) 4', 9'; Cards: Galvin (yellow card) 5' to 7'		Try: Powell 1'm Con: Snowsill (0/1)	Referee: Hollie Davidson (Scotland)

8 June 2018	New Zealand	54–7	Wales	Stade Jean-Bouin, Paris
16:44	Try: Tane (2) 1'c, 6'c Williams (2) 2'c, 11'm Fitzpatrick 3'c Brazier 5'c Broughton 8'c Waaka 13'c Con: Nathan-Wong (5/5) 1', 3', 4', 5', 7'; Willison (2/3) 9', 13'		Try: Joyce 14'c Con: Powell (1/1) 14'	Referee: Tyler Miller (Australia)

8 June 2018	Ireland	12–31	England	Stade Jean-Bouin, Paris
17:06	Try: Tyrell 2'm Galvin 7'c Con: Mulhall (1/2) 7'		Try: Scarratt (2) 0'm, 12'c Brown 4'c Fleming 6'm, 7'c Con: Scott (1/3) 4'; Aitchison (2/2) 8', 12'	Referee: Ben Crouse (South Africa)

8 June 2018	New Zealand	17–0	Ireland	Stade Jean-Bouin, Paris
19:28	Try: Williams 7'm Blyde (2) 10'm, 12'c Con: Nathan-Wong (1/3) 12'			Referee: Alhambra Nievas (Spain)

8 June 2018	England	45–12	Wales	Stade Jean-Bouin, Paris
19:50	Try: Fleming (2) 0'c, 3'c, 7'c Brown (2) 1'm, 6'm Fisher (2) 8'c, 9'c Con: Aitchison (4/6) 0', 3', 7', 9'; Fisher (1/1) 10'		Try: Joyce 13'c Butchers 14'm Con: Jones (1/1) 13'; Snowsill (0/1)	Referee: Sakurako Kawasaki (Japan)

=== Pool B ===
Team	Pld	W	D	L	PF	PA	PD	Pts
Australia	3	3	0	0	79	44	+35	9
Canada	3	2	0	1	66	48	+18	7
Fiji	3	1	0	2	42	57	–15	5
Russia	3	0	0	3	37	75	–38	3

8 June 2018	Australia	24–10	Fiji	Stade Jean-Bouin, Paris
14:44	Try: Du Toit (2) 3'm, 11'm Staples 7'c Caslick 13'c Con: Sykes (2/4) 8', 13'		Try: Naiobasali 5'm Cumu 14'm Con: Riwai (0/1); Tinai (0/1); Cards: Riwai (yellow card) 7' to 9'	Referee: Sakurako Kawasaki (Japan)

8 June 2018	Canada	31–5	Russia	Stade Jean-Bouin, Paris
15:06	Try: Crossley 4'c Landry (2) 7'm, 13'm Moleschi 7'c Benn 14'c Con: Landry (2/4) 4', 8'; Nicholas (1/1) 14'		Try: Mikhaltsova 9'm Con: Lushina (0/1)	Referee: Adam Jones (Wales)

8 June 2018	Australia	24–20	Russia	Stade Jean-Bouin, Paris
17:28	Try: Cherry 1'c Caslick 6'c Meakes 7'm Hayes 9'm Con: Sykes (2/3) 1', 6'; Hayes (0/1)		Try: Mikhaltsova 2'm Khamidova 7'm Zdrokova 12'm Con: Lushina (0/3); Seredina (0/1)	Referee: Sakurako Kawasaki (Japan)

8 June 2018	Canada	21–12	Fiji	Stade Jean-Bouin, Paris
17:50	Try: Farella (2) 2'c, 5'; Nicholas 8'c Con: Landry (3/3) 3', 6', 8'		Try: Ravisa 1'c Naimasi 14'; Con: Riwai (1/1) 2'	Referee: Joy Neville (Ireland)

8 June 2018	Australia	31–14	Canada	Stade Jean-Bouin, Paris
20:12	Try: Tonegato (2) 2'c, 7'm Sykes (2) 5'c, 7'm Du Toit 11'c Con: Sykes (2/4) 3', 5'; Cherry (1/1) 12'; Cards: Sykes (yellow card) 10' to 12'		Try: Williams 10'c Kaljuvee 13'c Con: Nicholas (2/2) 10', 13'	Referee: Sara Cox (England)

8 June 2018	Fiji	20–12	Russia	Stade Jean-Bouin, Paris
20:34	Try: Siata 0'm Savu (2) 4'm, 7'm Con: Savu (0/2); Naimasi (0/1); Tinai (0/1)		Try: Mikhaltsova (2) 9'c, 12'm Con: Seredina (1/2) 10'	Referee: Ben Crouse (South Africa)

=== Pool C ===
Team	Pld	W	D	L	PF	PA	PD	Pts
France	3	3	0	0	60	22	+38	9
United States	3	2	0	1	50	47	+3	7
Spain	3	1	0	2	35	51	–16	5
Japan	3	0	0	3	46	71	–25	3

8 June 2018	United States	24–19	Japan	Stade Jean-Bouin, Paris
15:28	Try: Carlyle 3'c, 6'm Tapper 5'm Thomas 7'c Con: Kelter (1/2) 3'; Heavirland (1/2) 8'		Try: Okuroda 7'c Suzuki 12'; Bativakalolo 14'm Con: Okuroda (2/3) 7', 12'	Referee: Tyler Miller (Australia)

8 June 2018	France	20–0	Spain	Stade Jean-Bouin, Paris
15:50	Try: Pelle 2'm Mayans 4'm Grassineau 13'm Tremouliere 14'm Con: Drouin (0/3); Izar (0/1)			Referee: Sara Cox (England)

8 June 2018	United States	21–14	Spain	Stade Jean-Bouin, Paris
18:12	Try: Doyle 2'c Kelter 4'; Heavirland 14'c Con: Heavirland (1/1) 3'; Kelter (2/2) 4', 14'; Cards: Kelter (yellow card) 8' to 10'		Try: Martínez 5'c Plà 11'c Con: García (2/2) 6', 11'	Referee: Hollie Davidson (Scotland)

8 June 2018	France	26–17	Japan	Stade Jean-Bouin, Paris
18:34	Try: Drouin 1'c Horta 3'c Grassineau 7'm Ciofani 7'c Con: Drouin (3/4) 1', 4', 7'; Cards: Sainlo (yellow card) 11' to 13'		Try: Bativakalolo (3) 11'f, 13'c, 14'm Con: Okuroda (1/3) 14'	Referee: Adam Jones (Wales)

8 June 2018	Japan	10–21	Spain	Stade Jean-Bouin, Paris
20:56	Try: Taniguchi 7'm Bativakalolo 9'm Con: Okuroda (0/2)		Try: Plà (2) 2'c, 11'c Echebarría 3'c Con: García (3/3) 2', 4', 11'	Referee: Tyler Miller (Australia)

8 June 2018	United States	5–14	France	Stade Jean-Bouin, Paris
21:18	Try: Doyle 1'm Con: Kelter (0/1)		Try: Pelle 8'c Grassineau 13'c Con: Drouin (1/1) 9'; Izar (1/1) 14'	Referee: Joy Neville (Ireland)

== Knockout stage ==
=== Challenge Trophy ===
Semi-finals
9 June 2018 – 15:02 – Stade Jean-Bouin, Paris
Ireland	17
Wales	7
9 June 2018 – 15:24 – Stade Jean-Bouin, Paris
Japan	0
Russia	38

Final
9 June 2018 – 22:20 – Stade Jean-Bouin, Paris
Ireland	10
Russia	5
Eleventh Place
9 June 2018 – 21:58 – Stade Jean-Bouin, Paris
Wales	12
Japan	17

Matches

Semifinals

9 June 2018	Ireland	17–7	Wales	Stade Jean-Bouin, Paris
15:02	Try: Flood 6'm Murphy-Crowe 13'c Higgins 14'm Con: Mulhall (1/3) 13'		Try: Joyce 4'c Con: Snowsill (1/1) 5'	Referee: Sakurako Kawasaki (Japan)

9 June 2018	Japan	0–38	Russia	Stade Jean-Bouin, Paris
15:24			Try: Zdrokova (2) 3'c, 8'm Mikhaltsova (2) 5'c, 11'm Lushina 7'c Bobkova 9'c Con: Lushina (4/6) 4', 5', 7', 10'	Referee: Ben Crouse (South Africa)

Eleventh Place

9 June 2018	Wales	12–17	Japan	Stade Jean-Bouin, Paris
21:58	Try: Powell Hughes 4'c Joyce 8'm Con: Jones (1/1) 4'; Snowsill (0/1)		Try: Otake 0'm Bativakalolo (2) 7'c, 14'm Con: Okuroda (1/3) 7'	Referee: Ben Crouse (South Africa)

Final

9 June 2018	Ireland	10–5	Russia	Stade Jean-Bouin, Paris
22:20	Try: Murphy-Crowe (2) 10'm, 14'm Con: Mulhall (0/2)		Try: Zdrokova 4'm Con: Lushina (0/1); Cards: Perestiak (yellow card) 14' to 14'	Referee: Sakurako Kawasaki (Japan)

=== 5th place ===
Semi-finals
9 June 2018 – 20:30 – Stade Jean-Bouin, Paris
Spain	5
United States	33
9 June 2018 – 20:52 – Stade Jean-Bouin, Paris
Fiji	19
England	14

Final
10 June 2018 – 16:43 – Stade Jean-Bouin, Paris
United States	28
Fiji	7
Seventh Place
10 June 2018 – 16:21 – Stade Jean-Bouin, Paris
Spain	20
England	7

Matches

Semifinals

9 June 2018	Spain	5–33	United States	Stade Jean-Bouin, Paris
20:30	Try: Erbina 13'		Try: Doyle (2) 1'c, 9'c Gustaitis 3'm Gray 4'c Maher 14'c Con: Heavirland (3/3) 1', 4', 9'; Kelter (1/2) 14'	Referee: Tyler Miller (Australia)

9 June 2018	Fiji	19–14	England	Stade Jean-Bouin, Paris
20:52	Try: Naimasi 6'm Naiobasali 10'c Penalty Try 14'; Con: Riwai (1/2) 10'; Cards: Naimasi (yellow card) 3' to 5'		Try: Fisher 1'c Brown 4'c Con: Aitchison (2/2) 1', 4'; Cards: Scott (yellow card) 13' to 14'; Wood (yellow card) 14' to 14'	Referee: Adam Jones (Wales)

Seventh Place

10 June 2018	Spain	20-7	England	Stade Jean-Bouin, Paris
16:21	Try: García (2) 7'm, 8'm Bueso 10'm Casado 12'm Con: García (0/2); Casado (0/2)		Try: Brown 6'c Con: Aitchison (1/1) 6'; Cards: Fleming (yellow card) 2' to 4'; Wood (yellow card) 7' to 9'	Referee: Tyler Miller (Australia)

Final

10 June 2018	United States	28-7	Fiji	Stade Jean-Bouin, Paris
16:43	Try: Thomas 2'c Tapper 9'c Doyle 12'c Maher 14'c Con: Heavirland (3/3) 3', 12', 14'; Kelter (1/1) 9'		Try: Siata 6'c Con: Riwai (1/1) 7'	Referee: Adam Jones (Wales)

=== Cup ===
Quarter-finals
9 June 2018 – 15:46 – Stade Jean-Bouin, Paris
New Zealand	38
Spain	0
9 June 2018 – 16:08 – Stade Jean-Bouin, Paris
Canada	26
United States	24
9 June 2018 – 16:30 – Stade Jean-Bouin, Paris
Australia	22
Fiji	19
9 June 2018 – 16:52 – Stade Jean-Bouin, Paris
France	48
England	7

Semi-finals
9 June 2018 – 21:14 – Stade Jean-Bouin, Paris
New Zealand	34
Canada	7
9 June 2018 – 21:36 – Stade Jean-Bouin, Paris
Australia	21
France	17

Final
10 June 2018 – 17:30 – Stade Jean-Bouin, Paris
New Zealand	33
Australia	7
Third place
10 June 2018 – 17:05 – Stade Jean-Bouin, Paris
Canada	17
France	10

Matches

Quarterfinals

9 June 2018	New Zealand	38–0	Spain	Stade Jean-Bouin, Paris
15:46	Try: Woodman (2) 5'c, 10'm Broughton (2) 7'c, 14'm Blyde 8'c Brazier 12'c Con: Nathan-Wong (3/4) 5', 7', 8'; Willison (1/2) 13'			Referee: Sara Cox (England)

9 June 2018	Canada	26–24	United States	Stade Jean-Bouin, Paris
16:08	Try: Landry 2'c Williams 5'm Benn 7'c Farella 13'c Con: Landry (3/4) 3', 7', 13'		Try: Tapper (2) 1'c, 14'm Doyle 7'c Thomas 12'm Con: Kelter (2/4) 1', 7'	Referee: Hollie Davidson (Scotland)

9 June 2018	Australia	22–19	Fiji	Stade Jean-Bouin, Paris
16:30	Try: Caslick 6'c Du Toit (2) 7'm, 11'c Cherry 13'm Con: Emma Sykes (1/4) 12'; Cards: Caslick (yellow card) 1' to 3'		Try: Naiobasali 2'm Siata 7'c Cumu 10'c Con: Riwai (1/2) 7'; Naimasi (1/1) 10'	Referee: Joy Neville (Ireland)

9 June 2018	France	48–7	England	Stade Jean-Bouin, Paris
16:52	Try: Horta (2) 3'm, 6'c Mayans (2) 7'm, 9'c Ciofani 10'm Drouin 12'm Izar 13'c, 14'c Con: Drouin (4/8) 6', 9', 13', 14'		Try: Fleming 1'c Con: McKenna (1/1) 1'	Referee: Alhambra Nievas (Spain)

Semifinals

9 June 2018	New Zealand	34–7	Canada	Stade Jean-Bouin, Paris
21:14	Try: Nathan-Wong (2) 1'm, 12'c Blyde 4'c Woodman 7'm Tui 10'm Brazier 14'm Con: Nathan-Wong (2/6) 4', 13'		Try: Farella 6'c Con: Landry (1/1) 6'	Referee: Alhambra Nievas (Spain)

9 June 2018	Australia	21–17	France	Stade Jean-Bouin, Paris
21:36	Try: Du Toit 3'c Cherry (2) 6'c, 14'c Con: Sykes (3/3) 3', 7', 14'; Cards: Pelite (yellow card) 10' to 12'		Try: F. Horta 8'm M. Mayans 10'c Pelle 12'm Con: Drouin (1/2) 10'; Izar (0/1)	Referee: Sara Cox (England)

Third Place

10 June 2018	Canada	17-10	France	Stade Jean-Bouin, Paris
17:05	Try: Landry 1'c Williams 4'm Farella 9'm Con: Landry (1/3) 1'		Try: Guerin 6'm Izar 7'm Con: Izar (0/1); Drouin (0/1); Cards: Horta (yellow card) 4' to 6'	Referee: Hollie Davidson (Scotland)

Final

10 June 2018	New Zealand	33-7	Australia	Stade Jean-Bouin, Paris
17:30	Try: Blyde (2) 0'c, 7'c Goss 3'm Woodman (2) 5'c, 14'c Con: Nathan-Wong (3/3) 1', 7', 14'; Brazier (1/2) 6'; Cards: Nathan-Wong (yellow card) 2' to 4'		Try: Pelite 12'c Con: Brown (1/1) 12'; Cards: Meakes (yellow card) 2' to 4'	Referee: Joy Neville (Ireland)

== Tournament placings ==
Place	Team	Points
1st place, gold medalist(s)	New Zealand	20
2nd place, silver medalist(s)	Australia	18
3rd place, bronze medalist(s)	Canada	16
4	France	14
5	United States	12
6	Fiji	10

Place	Team	Points
7	Spain	8
8	England	6
9	Ireland	4
10	Russia	3
11	Japan	2
12	Wales	1

Source: World Rugby

== Players ==
=== Scoring leaders ===
Tries scored
Rank	Player	Tries
1	(New Zealand) Michaela Blyde	8
2	(New Zealand) Portia Woodman	7
2	Raichielmiyo Bativakalolo	7
4	(Russia) Alena Mikhaltsova	6
4	(England) Deborah Fleming	6

Points scored
Rank	Player	Points
1	Alev Kelter	40
1	Michaela Blyde	40
3	Tyla Nathan-Wong	38
4	Portia Woodman	35
4	Raichielmiyo Bativakalolo	35

Source: World Rugby

=== Dream Team ===
The following seven players were selected to the tournament Dream Team at the conclusion of the tournament:

Forwards	Backs
Raichielmiyo Bativakalolo; Bianca Farella; Pricilla Sauvavi Siata	(France) Camille Grassineau; Dominique Du Toit; Michaela Blyde; Emilee Cherry

== See also ==
- 2018 Paris Sevens (men)

World Sevens Series XIX
Preceded by 2018 Canada Women's Sevens	2018 France Women's Sevens	Succeeded by None (last event)
France Women's Sevens
Preceded by 2017 France Women's Sevens	2018 France Women's Sevens	Succeeded by 2019 France Women's Sevens
