= 2018 Sydney Women's Sevens =

- Women's Sevens Series VI
- Host nation: Australia
- Date: 26–28 January 2018

Cup
- Champion: Australia
- Runner-up: New Zealand
- Third: Canada

Challenge Cup
- Winner: England

Tournament details
- Matches played: 34
- Tries scored: 199 (average 5.85 per match)
- Most points: (New Zealand) Portia Woodman (65)
- Most tries: (New Zealand) Portia Woodman (13)

The 2018 Sydney Women's Sevens was the second tournament of the 2017–18 World Rugby Women's Sevens Series. It was the second edition of the Australian Women's Sevens and was held over the weekend of 26–28 January 2018 at Allianz Stadium in Sydney, Australia.

Performances at this tournament helped determine the first ten seedings for the 2018 Rugby World Cup Sevens together with the previous year's series and the 2017 Dubai Women's Sevens.

== Format ==
The teams are drawn into three pools of four teams each. Each team plays every other team in their pool once. The top two teams from each pool advance to the Cup brackets while the top 2 third place teams also compete in the Cup/Plate. The other teams from each group play-off for the Challenge Trophy.

== Teams ==
Eleven core teams are participating in the tournament along with one invited team, the highest-placing non-core team of the 2017 Oceania Women's Sevens Championship, Papua New Guinea:

- Australia
- Canada
- England
- Fiji
- France
- Ireland
- Japan
- New Zealand
- Papua New Guinea
- Russia
- Spain
- United States

== Pool stage ==
All times in Australian Eastern Daylight Time (UTC+11:00)

=== Pool A ===
Team	Pld	W	D	L	PF	PA	PD	Pts
Australia	3	3	0	0	122	0	+122	9
France	3	2	0	1	72	43	+29	7
Spain	3	1	0	2	29	51	–22	5
Papua New Guinea	3	0	0	3	0	129	–129	3

26 January 2018	France	50–0	Papua New Guinea	Allianz Stadium, Sydney
11:28	Try: Pelle 1'; Neissen 5'; Amedee 6'; Grassineau 8', 13'; Guerin 9'; Coutouly 11', 14'; Con: Amedee (3/3) 1', 6', 8'; Biscarat (1/1) 7'; Drouin (1/4) 14'		Cards: Rama (yellow card) 5' to 7'	Referee: (New Zealand) Rebecca Mahoney

26 January 2018	Australia	29–0	Spain	Allianz Stadium, Sydney
11:50	Try: Sykes 1', 10'; Caslick 3'; Green 5'; Pelite 12'; Con: Sykes (2/4) 1', 4'; Williams (0/1)			Referee: (Scotland) Hollie Davidson

26 January 2018	France	22–0	Spain	Allianz Stadium, Sydney
14:12	Try: Okemba 5', 8'; Guerin 11'; Biscarat 14'; Con: Amedee (1/4) 8'			Referee: (Ireland) Joy Neville

26 January 2018	Australia	50–0	Papua New Guinea	Allianz Stadium, Sydney
14:34	Try: Caslick 1', 6'; Staples 3'; Green 7'; Friedrichs 8'; Tonegato 13', 14'; Con: Sykes (3/5) 6', 7', 8'; Williams (2/3) 11', 14'			Referee: (Spain) Alhambra Nievas

26 January 2018	Spain	29–0	Papua New Guinea	Allianz Stadium, Sydney
16:56	Try: Pla 1'; Garcia 4'; Martinez Garcia 6'; Barrutieta 13'; Echebarria 14'; Con: Garcia (1/3) 2'; Casado (1/2) 13'		Cards: Larry (yellow card) 1' to 3'; Rama (yellow card) 10' to 12'	Referee: (South Africa) Ben Crouse

26 January 2018	Australia	43–0	France	Allianz Stadium, Sydney
17:18	Try: Cherry 1', 10'; Quirk 3'; Caslick 5'; Green 7', 8', 12'; Con: Sykes (3/6) 1', 6', 8'; Williams (1/1) 12'		Cards: Horta (yellow card) 7' to 9'	Referee: (New Zealand) Rebecca Mahoney

=== Pool B ===
Team	Pld	W	D	L	PF	PA	PD	Pts
New Zealand	3	3	0	0	112	19	+93	9
United States	3	1	0	2	62	59	+3	5
England	3	1	0	2	50	74	–24	5
Japan	3	1	0	2	24	96	–72	5

26 January 2018	United States	24–28	England	Allianz Stadium, Sydney
10:44	Try: Tapper 7', 9', 14'; Kelter 12'; Con: Kelter (2/3) 7', 9'; Heavirland (0/1)		Try: Fisher 1'; Aitchison 3'; Breach 10', 14'; Con: Aitchison (3/3) 1', 3', 11'; Scott 14'	Referee: (Spain) Alhambra Nievas

26 January 2018	New Zealand	48–7	Japan	Allianz Stadium, Sydney
11:06	Try: Woodman 1', 8', 9', 11'; Blyde 2', 7'; Tui 4'; Waaka 14'; Con: Willison (1/4) 5'; Nathan-Wong (3/4) 9', 11', 14'; Cards: Tui (yellow card) 12' to 14'		Try: Tanaka 6'; Con: Tanaka (1/1) 6'	Referee: (Ireland) Joy Neville

26 January 2018	United States	38–0	Japan	Allianz Stadium, Sydney
13:28	Try: Tapper 2', 8'; Kelter 4', 7'; Rogers 9', 13'; Con: Kelter (3/4) 2', 7', 8'; Heavirland (1/2) 9'			Referee: (Scotland) Hollie Davidson

26 January 2018	New Zealand	33–12	England	Allianz Stadium, Sydney
13:50	Try: Blyde 1', 9'; Woodman 5', 11', 12'; Con: Nathan-Wong (3/4) 2', 5', 10'; Willison (1/1) 13'		Try: Fleming 8'; Breach 14'; Con: Scott (1/1) 14'; Aitchison (0/1)	Referee: (South Africa) Ben Crouse

26 January 2018	United States	0–31	New Zealand	Allianz Stadium, Sydney
16:12			Try: Woodman 1', 6', 11'; Blyde 8'; Broughton 14'; Con: Nathan-Wong (3/5) 6', 11', 14'	Referee: (Japan) Saurako Kawaski

26 January 2018	England	10–17	Japan	Allianz Stadium, Sydney
16:34	Try: Wilson-Hardy 3'; Thompson 11'; Con: Scott (0/1); Aitchison (0/1)		Try: Tanaka 2'; Nakamura 6'; Suzuki 8'; Con: Tanaka (1/2) 7'; Hirano (0/1)	Referee: (Italy) Beatrice Benvenuti

=== Pool C ===
Team	Pld	W	D	L	PF	PA	PD	Pts
Canada	3	3	0	0	67	29	+38	9
Russia	3	2	0	1	43	38	+5	7
Ireland	3	1	0	2	36	57	–21	5
Fiji	3	0	0	3	38	60	–22	3

26 January 2018	Russia	19–7	Ireland	Allianz Stadium, Sydney
10:00	Try: Khamidova 1'; Zdrokova 10'; Mikhaltsova 12'; Con: Mikhaltsova (2/3) 2', 10'		Try: Murphy Crowe 7'; Con: Mulhall (1/1) 7'	Referee: (South Africa) Ben Crouse

26 January 2018	Canada	24–12	Fiji	Allianz Stadium, Sydney
10:22	Try: Crossley 1'; Darling 3'; Benn 9', 12'; Con: Landry (2/4) 10', 13'		Try: Ravisa 7'; Naiobasali 8'; Con: Nagasau (1/2) 7'	Referee: (England) Sara Cox

26 January 2018	Russia	19–12	Fiji	Allianz Stadium, Sydney
12:44	Try: Mikhaltsova 1'; Seredina 3'; Zdrokova 14'; Con: Mikhaltsova (1/2) 1'; Lushina 14'; Cards: Bobkova (yellow card) 6' to 8'		Try: Naimasi 8'; Ravisa 11'; Con: Nagasau (1/2) 8'	Referee: (Italy) Beatrice Benvenuti

26 January 2018	Canada	24–12	Ireland	Allianz Stadium, Sydney
13:06	Try: Greenshields 2'; Watcham-Roy 6'; Benn 11'; Darling 14'; Con: Nicholas (2/2) 2', 7'; Landry (0/2)		Try: Flood 4'; Mulhall 9'; Con: Mulhall (1/2) 9'	Referee: (Japan) Saurako Kawaski

26 January 2018	Russia	5–19	Canada	Allianz Stadium, Sydney
15:28	Try: Bobkova 6'; Cards: Kukina (yellow card) 8' to 10'; Khamidova (yellow card) 11' to 13'		Try: Landry 1'; Greenshields 8'; Watcham=Roy 13'; Con: Landry (2/3) 1', 13'	Referee: (New Zealand) Rebecca Mahoney

26 January 2018	Ireland	17–14	Fiji	Allianz Stadium, Sydney
15:50	Try: Murphy Crowe 8'; O'Flynn 10', 13'; Con: Mulhall (1/3) 8'		Try: Naiobasali 2'; Roqica 12'; Con: Nagasau (1/1) 3'; Savu (1/1) 12'	Referee: (Scotland) Hollie Davidson

== Knockout stage ==
=== Challenge Trophy ===
Semi-finals
27 January 2018 – 9:00 – Allianz Stadium, Sydney
England	52
Papua New Guinea	0
27 January 2018 – 9:22 – Allianz Stadium, Sydney
Japan	10
Fiji	19

Challenge Trophy Final
27 January 2018 – 12:06 – Allianz Stadium, Sydney
England	29
Fiji	10
11th Place
27 January 2018 – 11:44 – Allianz Stadium, Sydney
Papua New Guinea	5
Japan	41

Matches

Semi-finals

27 January 2018	England	52–0	Papua New Guinea	Allianz Stadium, Sydney
9:00	Try: Thompson 1', 5', 8'; Fisher 2'; Breach 7', 9', 13'; Fleming 11'; Con: Aitchison (6/8) 1', 3', 6', 10', 11', 13'			Referee: (Japan) Saurako Kawaski

27 January 2018	Japan	10–19	Fiji	Allianz Stadium, Sydney
9:22	Try: Yoko 6'; Hirano 13'; Con: Tanaka (0/2)		Try: Savu 1'; Naimasi 9'; Naiqato 12'; Con: Nagasau (2/3) 1', 10'	Referee: (Spain) Alhambra Nievas

11th place

27 January 2018	Papua New Guinea	5–41	Japan	Allianz Stadium, Sydney
11:44	Try: Kaore 2'		Try: Hirano 1'; Nakamura 3'; Koide 5'; Otake 7'; Suzuki 8', 14'; Yoko 12'; Con: Tanaka (3/7) 1', 4', 8'	Referee: (South Africa) Ben Crouse

Challenge Trophy Final

27 January 2018	England	29–10	Fiji	Allianz Stadium, Sydney
12:06	Try: Breach 1', 13', 14'; Aitchison 4'; Fleming 8'; Con: Aitchison (2/5) 4', 9'		Try: Tinai 6'; Naiobasali 10'	Referee: (Scotland) Hollie Davidson

=== 5th place ===
Semi-finals
27 January 2018 – 12:33 – Allianz Stadium, Sydney
Spain	24
United States	19
27 January 2018 – 13:15 – Allianz Stadium, Sydney
Ireland	7
France	17

5th Place Final
28 January 2018 – 13:48 – Allianz Stadium, Sydney
Spain	5
France	19
7th Place
28 January 2018 – 13:26 – Allianz Stadium, Sydney
United States	10
Ireland	19

Matches

Semi-finals

27 January 2018	Spain	24–19	United States	Allianz Stadium, Sydney
12:33	Try: Garcia 1', 5', 14'; Echebarria 3'; Con: Garcia (2/4) 1', 4'		Try: Carlyle 7', 12'; Tapper 14'; Con: Heavirland (2/3) 7', 12'	Referee: (Japan) Saurako Kawaski

27 January 2018	Ireland	7–17	France	Allianz Stadium, Sydney
13:15	Try: Murphy-Crowe 6'; Con: Mulhall (1/1) 7'		Try: Amedee 3'; Okemba 8', 13'; Con: Amedee (1/3) 8'	Referee: (New Zealand) Rebecca Mahoney

7th Place

28 January 2018	United States	10–19	Ireland	Allianz Stadium, Sydney
13:26	Try: Galvin 1', 8'; Murphy-Crowe 6'; Con: Mulhall (2/3) 1', 6'		Try: Emba 10'; Rogers 14'; Con: Heavirland (0/1); Kelter (0/1)	Referee: (Spain) Alhambra Nievas

5th Place Final

28 January 2018	Spain	5–19	France	Allianz Stadium, Sydney
13:48	Try: Alger 14'; Con: Casada (0/1)		Try: Okemba 3'; Amedee 8'; Biscarat; Con: Amedee (2/2) 3', 8'	Referee: (New Zealand) Rebecca Mahoney

=== Cup ===
Quarter-finals
27 January 2018 – 9:44 – Allianz Stadium, Sydney
Australia	29
Spain	0
27 January 2018 – 10:06 – Allianz Stadium, Sydney
United States	14
Russia	19
27 January 2018 – 10:28 – Allianz Stadium, Sydney
New Zealand	36
Ireland	0
27 January 2018 – 10:50 – Allianz Stadium, Sydney
Canada	28
France	12

Semi-finals
27 January 2018 – 13:37 – Allianz Stadium, Sydney
Australia	31
Russia	0
27 January 2018 – 13:59 – Allianz Stadium, Sydney
New Zealand	26
Canada	0

Cup Final
28 January 2018 – 14:37 – Allianz Stadium, Sydney
Australia	31
New Zealand	0
Bronze Medal Match
28 January 2018 – 14:10 – Allianz Stadium, Sydney
Russia	12
Canada	40

Matches

Quarter-finals

27 January 2018	Australia	29–0	Spain	Allianz Stadium, Sydney
9:44	Try: Caslick 1', 5'; Cherry 3'; Williams 8'; Tonegato 11'; Con: Sykes (2/5) 6', 11'			Referee: (Scotland) Hollie Davidson

27 January 2018	United States	14–19	Russia	Allianz Stadium, Sydney
10:06	Try: Kelter 9'; Emba 11'; Con: Kelter (2/2) 9', 11'		Try: Mikhaltsova 1'; Zdrokova 4'; Khamidova 8'; Con: Mikhaltsova (2/3) 4', 8'	Referee: (South Africa) Ben Crouse

27 January 2018	New Zealand	36–0	Ireland	Allianz Stadium, Sydney
10:28	Try: Blyde 2', 7'; Woodman 5', 9'; Waaka 12'; Broughton 14'; Con: Nathan-Wong (3/6) 7', 10', 13'			Referee: (Italy) Beatrice Benvenuti

27 January 2018	Canada	28–12	France	Allianz Stadium, Sydney
10:50	Try: Greenshields 5'; Benn 6', 10'; Nicholas 13'; Con: Landry (4/4) 5', 7', 10', 14'		Try: Grassineau 3'; Amedee 7'; Con: Amedee (1/2) 3'	Referee: (New Zealand) Rebecca Mahoney

Semi-finals

27 January 2018	Australia	31–0	Russia	Allianz Stadium, Sydney
13:37	Try: Cherry 3'; Tonegato 5'; Caslick 9'; Staples 12'; Quirk 14'; Con: Sykes (2/4) 4', 10'; Williams (1/1) 14'			Referee: (Spain) Alhambra Nievas

27 January 2018	New Zealand	26–0	Canada	Allianz Stadium, Sydney
13:59	Try: Woodman 1'; Broughton 3'; Brazier 9'; Blyde 12'; Con: Nathan-Wong (3/4) 3', 9', 13'			Referee: (Ireland) Joy Neville

Bronze Medal Match

28 January 2018	Russia	12–40	Canada	Allianz Stadium, Sydney
14:10	Try: Bystrova 4'; Perestiak 7'; Con: Seredina (1/1) 5'; Kukina (0/1)		Try: Greenshields 1', 13'; Crossley 3'; Nicholas 6'; Kish 11'; Moleschi 14'; Con: Landry (5/6) 1', 7', 11', 13', 14'	Referee: (Scotland) Hollie Davidson

Cup Final

28 January 2018	Australia	31–0	New Zealand	Allianz Stadium, Sydney
14:37	Try: Parry 1'; Caslick 7'; Green 8'; Pelite 10'; 12'; Con: Sykes (3/5) 8', 10', 12'; Cards: Sykes (yellow card) 14' to 14'		Cards: Nathan-Wong (yellow card) 7' to 9'

== Tournament placings ==
Place	Team	Points
1st place, gold medalist(s)	Australia	20
2nd place, silver medalist(s)	New Zealand	18
3rd place, bronze medalist(s)	Canada	16
4	Russia	14
5	France	12
6	Spain	10

Place	Team	Points
7	Ireland	8
8	United States	6
9	England	4
10	Fiji	3
11	Japan	2
12	Papua New Guinea	1

Source: World Rugby

== Players ==
=== Scoring leaders ===
Tries scored
Rank	Player	Tries
1	(New Zealand) Portia Woodman	13
2	(England) Jess Breach	9
3	(Australia) Charlotte Caslick	8
	(New Zealand) Michaela Blyde	8
5	(Australia) Ellia Green	6

Points scored
Rank	Player	Points
1	(New Zealand) Portia Woodman	65
2	(Australia) Emma Sykes (rugby union)	45
	(England) Jess Breach	45
4	(Australia) Charlotte Caslick	40
	(New Zealand) Michaela Blyde	40

Source: World Rugby

=== Dream Team ===
The following seven players were selected to the tournament Dream Team at the conclusion of the tournament:

Forwards	Backs
(New Zealand) Portia Woodman (Russia) Baizat Khamidova (Canada) Brittany Benn	(Australia) Charlotte Caslick (New Zealand) Michaela Blyde (Australia) Emilee Cherry (England) Jess Breach

== See also ==
- World Rugby Women's Sevens Series
- 2017–18 World Rugby Women's Sevens Series
- 2018 Sydney Sevens (for men)

World Women's Sevens Series VI
Preceded by 2017 Dubai Women's Sevens	2018 Sydney Sevens	Succeeded by 2018 Japan Women's Sevens
Sydney Women's Sevens
Preceded by 2017 Sydney Women's Sevens	2018 Sydney Women's Sevens	Succeeded by 2019 Sydney Women's Sevens
