= 2018 Canada Women's Sevens =

Tournament in Canada

- Women's Sevens Series VI
- Host nation: Canada
- Date: 12–13 May 2018

Cup
- Champion: New Zealand
- Runner-up: Australia
- Third: United States

Challenge Trophy
- Winner: Japan

Tournament details
- Matches played: 34
- Tries scored: 209 (average 6.15 per match)
- Most points: Alev Kelter (52)
- Most tries: Bianca Farella (8)

The 2018 Canada Women's Sevens was the fourth tournament within the 2017–18 World Rugby Women's Sevens Series and the fourth edition of the Canada Women's Sevens to be played in the series. It was held over the weekend of 12–13 May 2018 at Westhills Stadium in Langford, British Columbia.

== Format ==
The teams are drawn into three pools of four teams each. Each team plays every other team in their pool once. The top two teams from each pool advance to the Cup brackets while the top 2 third place teams also compete in the Cup/Plate. The other teams from each group play-off for the Challenge Trophy.

== Teams ==
Eleven core teams are participating in the tournament along with one invited team, Brazil:

- Australia
- Brazil
- Canada
- England
- Fiji
- France
- Ireland
- Japan
- New Zealand
- Russia
- Spain
- United States

== Pool stage ==
All times in Pacific Daylight Time (UTC−07:00)

=== Pool A ===
Team	Pld	W	D	L	PF	PA	PD	Pts
New Zealand	3	3	0	0	85	7	+78	9
Fiji	3	2	0	1	78	40	+38	7
England	3	1	0	2	45	63	–18	5
Brazil	3	0	0	3	31	129	–98	3

12 May 2018	Fiji	24–14	England	Westhills Stadium, Langford
11:58	Try: Savu 3'm Tisolo 5'm, 6'c Siata 9'c Con: Tisolo (2/2) 7', 10'; Riwai (0/2)		Try: Fisher 0'c Con: Scott (1/1) 1'	Referee: Sakurako Kawasaki (Japan)

12 May 2018	New Zealand	51–0	Brazil	Westhills Stadium, Langford
12:20	Try: Woddman 0'; Blyde 2'c, 7'c Williams 4'm, 6'c Tui 7'm Goss 9'm Fitzpatrick 11'm Brazier 13'm Con: Willison (3/6) 3', 6', 8'; Nathan-Wong (0/2)			Referee: Aimee Barrett-Theron (South Africa)

12 May 2018	Fiji	47–14	Brazil	Westhills Stadium, Langford
14:52	Try: Savu 1'c Tisolo 3'c Naiobasali 5'm, 7'c Riwai 8'c Ravisa 12'c Cumu 14'c Con: Tisolo (6/7) 2', 4', 7', 9', 12', 14'		Try: B Silva 6'c Cerullo 9'c Con: Cerullo (1/1) 6'; Kochhan (1/1) 10'	Referee: Sakurako Kawasaki (Japan)

12 May 2018	New Zealand	22–0	England	Westhills Stadium, Langford
15:14	Try: Blyde 2'c, 13'm Nathan-Wong 5'm Williams 9'm Con: Nathan-Wong (1/3) 2'; Willison (0/1)			Referee: Joy Neville (Ireland)

12 May 2018	England	31–17	Brazil	Westhills Stadium, Langford
17:44	Try: Fleming 3'm Scott 6'c Brown 12'm, 14'c Fleming 13'c Con: Scott (1/2) 6'; McKenna (2/3) 14', 14'; Cards: Jones (yellow card) 7' to 9'		Try: Nicolau 1'c, 9'm B Silva 8'm Con: Kochhan (1/3) 2'; Cards: Kochhan (yellow card) 14' to 14'; Araujo (yellow card) 14' to 14'	Referee: Rebecca Mahoney (New Zealand)

12 May 2018	New Zealand	12–7	Fiji	Westhills Stadium, Langford
18:06	Try: Williams 3'm Blyde 7'c Con: Nathan-Wong (1/2) 7'		Try: Tisolo 1'c Con: Tisolo (1/1) 2'	Referee: Sara Cox (England)

=== Pool B ===
Team	Pld	W	D	L	PF	PA	PD	Pts
France	3	3	0	0	100	26	+74	9
United States	3	2	0	1	82	43	+39	7
Japan	3	1	0	2	38	68	–30	5
Russia	3	0	0	3	21	104	–83	3

12 May 2018	Russia	14–35	United States	Westhills Stadium, Langford
10:30	Try: Noritsina 10'c Kazantseva 14'c Con: Kulkova (2/2) 11', 14'		Try: Tapper 1'c Heavirland 3'c Emba 5'c Carlyle 7'c Kelter 7'c Con: Kelter (5/5) 1', 3', 5', 7', 7'	Referee: Adam Jones (Wales)

12 May 2018	France	33–7	Japan	Westhills Stadium, Langford
10:52	Try: Bertrand 1'm Amedee 3'c, 5'c Ciofani 11'c Pelle 14'c Con: Amedee (2/3) 3', 5'; Le Pesq (2/2) 11', 14'		Try: Kozasa 13'c Con: Okuroda (1/1) 13'; Cards: Nakamura (yellow card) 3' to 5'	Referee: Joy Neville (Ireland)

12 May 2018	Russia	7–24	Japan	Westhills Stadium, Langford
13:24	Try: Noritsina 0'c Con: Kulkova (1/1) 1'		Try: Tanaka 4'c Hirano 7'm, 14'c Kozasa 8'm Con: Okuroda (1/3); Nakamura (1/1) 14'; Cards: Nakamura (yellow card) 5' to 7'	Referee: Ben Crouse (South Africa)

12 May 2018	France	22–19	United States	Westhills Stadium, Langford
13:46	Try: Amedee 2'm, 7'm Bertrand 5'm Le Pesq 14'c Con: Drouin (1/1) 14'; Le Pesq (0/3)		Try: Gustaitis 1'm Tapper 10'c Kelter 12'c Con: Kelter (2/3) 10', 12'	Referee: Adam Jones (Wales)

12 May 2018	United States	28–7	Japan	Westhills Stadium, Langford
16:16	Try: Gustaitis 1'c Tapper 7'c, 13'c Emba 7'c Con: Kelter (1/1) 1'; Heavirland (3/3) 7', 8', 13'		Try: Hirano 5'c Con: Okuroda (1/1) 5'	Referee: Aimee Barrett-Theron (South Africa)

12 May 2018	France	45–0	Russia	Westhills Stadium, Langford
16:28	Try: Guerin 0'm Amedee 3'm Grassineau 5'c Le Pesq 6'c Horta 9'c Drouin 13'c Ciofani 14'c Con: Le Pesq (1/3) 5'; Amedee (1/1) 7'; Drouin (3/3) 10', 13', 14'			Referee: Ben Crouse (South Africa)

=== Pool C ===
Team	Pld	W	D	L	PF	PA	PD	Pts
Australia	3	3	0	0	96	36	+60	9
Canada	3	2	0	1	50	49	+1	7
Ireland	3	1	0	2	43	50	–7	5
Spain	3	0	0	3	20	74	–54	3

12 May 2018	Spain	0–7	Ireland	Westhills Stadium, Langford
11:14			Try: Galvin 3'c Con: Mulhall (1/1) 3'	Referee: Sara Cox (England)

12 May 2018	Australia	22–7	Canada	Westhills Stadium, Langford
11:36	Try: Tonegato 1'm, 7'c Meaked 8'm Du Toit 10'm Con: Sykes (1/4) 7'		Try: Farella 13'c Con: Landry (1/1) 14'	Referee: Rebecca Mahoney (New Zealand)

12 May 2018	Spain	10–24	Canada	Westhills Stadium, Langford
14:08	Try: Garcia 2'm, 8'm Con: Garcia (0/2)		Try: Williams 4'c, 13'm Nicholas 7'c Crossley 10'm Con: Landry (1/1) 4', 7'; Nicholas (0/2)	Referee: Sara Cox (England)

12 May 2018	Australia	31–19	Ireland	Westhills Stadium, Langford
14:30	Try: Du Toit 0'm Sykes 2'c Tonegato 4'm, 12'c Parry 6'c Con: Sykes (2/4) 2', 7'; Brown (1/1) 12'		Try: Murphy-Crowe 8'm, 13'c Higgins 10'c Con: Mulhall (2/4) 11', 14'	Referee: Rebecca Mahoney (New Zealand)

12 May 2018	Ireland	17–19	Canada	Westhills Stadium, Langford
17:00	Try: Murphy-Crowe 0'c, 7'm Flood 11'm Con: Mulhall (1/3) 0'		Try: Darling 4'c Watcham-Roy 8'm Williams 14'c Con: Landry (2/3) 4', 14'	Referee: Adam Jones (Welsh Rugby Football Union)

12 May 2018	Australia	43–10	Spain	Westhills Stadium, Langford
17:22	Try: Pelite 0'm Caslick 1'c, 4'c Cherry 5'c Tonegato 7'c Hayes 8'm Du Toit 12'm Con: Sykes (4/7) 2', 4', 6', 7'		Try: Cacho 10'm Losada 14'm Con: Casado (0/2)	Referee: Joy Neville (Ireland)

== Knockout stage ==
=== Challenge Trophy ===
Semi-finals
13 May 2018 – 10:48 – Westhills Stadium, Langford
Japan	31
Brazil	21
13 May 2018 – 11:10 – Westhills Stadium, Langford
Spain	14
Russia	7

Final
13 May 2018 – 14:16 – Westhills Stadium, Langford
Japan	26
Spain	21
Third place
13 May 2018 – 13:54 – Westhills Stadium, Langford
Brazil	24 (a.e.t.)
Russia	19

Matches

Semifinals

13 May 2018	Japan	31–21	Brazil	Westhills Stadium, Langford
10:48	Try: Koide 2'm Otake 4'm Tateyama 6'c, 11'c Bativakalolo 13'c Con: Okuroda (2/4) 7', 12'; Nakamura (1/1) 13'		Try: Kochhan 0'c B Silva 5'c, 9'c Con: Kochhan (1/1) 1'; Cerullo (2/2) 5', 9'	Referee: Aimee Barrett-Theron (South Africa)

13 May 2018	Spain	14–7	Russia	Westhills Stadium, Langford
11:10	Try: Pla 5'c, 6'c Con: Garcia (2/2) 5', 7'; Cards: Erbina (yellow card) 0' to 2'		Try: Danilova 1'c Con: Kulkova (1/1) 1'	Referee: Adam Jones (Wales)

Seventh Place

13 May 2018	Brazil	24–19 (a.e.t.)	Russia	Westhills Stadium, Langford
13:54	Try: Araujo 11'c, 12'c Kochhan 13'm B Silva 16'; Con: Kochhan (2/3) 11', 12'; Cards: Scratut (yellow card) 15' to 17'		Try: Danilova 2'c, 4'c Kazantseva 9'm Con: Kukina (1/1) 2'; Kulkova (1/2) 5'	Referee: Sakurako Kawasaki (Japan)

Final

13 May 2018	Japan	26–21	Spain	Westhills Stadium, Langford
14:16	Try: Nagata 4'c Nakamura 8'c, 10'c Kozasa 13'm Con: Okuroda (3/3) 4', 8', 11'; Nakamura (0/1)		Try: Echebarria 2'c, 12'c Barrutieta 6'c Con: Garcia (3/3) 2', 7'; Casado (1/1) 12'	Referee: Rebecca Mahoney (New Zealand)

=== 5th place ===
Semi-finals
13 May 2018 – 12:26 – Westhills Stadium, Langford
Ireland	19
Fiji	7
13 May 2018 – 12:48 – Westhills Stadium, Langford
Canada	35
England	12

Final
13 May 2018 – 15:32 – Westhills Stadium, Langford
Ireland	12
Canada	29
Seventh Place
13 May 2018 – 15:10 – Westhills Stadium, Langford
Fiji	24
England	29

Matches

Semifinals

13 May 2018	Ireland	19–7	Fiji	Westhills Stadium, Langford
12:26	Try: Galvin 0'c O'Flynn 6'c Flood 11'm Con: Mulhall (2/3) 1', 6'		Try: Daveua 2'c Con: Riwai (1/1) 2'; Cards: Naiobasali (yellow card) 5' (red card) 10'; Savu (yellow card) 7' to 9'	Referee: Sakurako Kawasaki (Japan)

13 May 2018	Canada	35–12	England	Westhills Stadium, Langford
12:48	Try: Kaljuvee 0'c Darling 6'c Landry 8'c Farella 10'c, 13'c Con: Landry (4/4) 1', 6', 8', 11'; Lukan (1/1) 13'		Try: Fleming 4'm, 14'c Con: Scott (1/2) 14'	Referee: Aimee Barrett-Theron (South Africa)

Seventh Place

13 May 2018	Fiji	24–29	England	Westhills Stadium, Langford
15:10	Try: Daveua 3'c, 10'm Ravisa 8'c Torooti 14'm Con: Riwai (2/3) 3', 8'; Naimasi (0/1)		Try: Brown 1'c Fleetwood 4'm, 5'm Scott 11'c Thompson 13'm Con: Scott (2/5) 1', 11'	Referee: Adam Jones (Wales)

Final

13 May 2018	Ireland	12–29	Canada	Westhills Stadium, Langford
15:32	Try: O'Flynn 4'm Tyrrell 14'c Con: Mulhall (1/2) 14'		Try: Farella 0'm, 7'c, 9'c Darling 2'm Williams 13'm Con: Landry (2/4) 7', 9'; Nicholas (0/1)	Referee: Ben Crouse (South Africa)

=== Cup ===
Quarter-finals
13 May 2018 – 9:20 – Westhills Stadium, Langford
France	27
Ireland	0
13 May 2018 – 9:42 – Westhills Stadium, Langford
Australia	21
Fiji	5
13 May 2018 – 10:04 – Westhills Stadium, Langford
United States	28
Canada	26
13 May 2018 – 10:26 – Westhills Stadium, Langford
New Zealand	17
England	12

Semi-finals
13 May 2018 – 13:10 – Westhills Stadium, Langford
France	12
Australia	17 (a.e.t.)
13 May 2018 – 13:32 – Westhills Stadium, Langford
United States	10
New Zealand	33

Final
13 May 2018 – 16:20 – Westhills Stadium, Langford
Australia	0
New Zealand	46
Third place
13 May 2018 – 15:54 – Westhills Stadium, Langford
France	5
United States	21

Matches

Quarterfinals

13 May 2018	France	27–0	Ireland	Westhills Stadium, Langford
9:20	Try: Grassineau 4'm, 5'm Horta 7'm Guerin 9'm Amedee 14'c Con: Amedee (1/4) 14'; Le Pesq (0/1)			Referee: Sara Cox (England)

13 May 2018	Australia	21–5	Fiji	Westhills Stadium, Langford
9:42	Try: Tonegato 1'c, 14'c Cherry 7'c Con: Sykes (3/3) 2', 7', 14'		Try: Naimasi 12'm Con: Riwai (0/1)	Referee: Rebecca Mahoney (New Zealand)

13 May 2018	United States	28–26	Canada	Westhills Stadium, Langford
10:04	Try: Gray 0'c Kelter 2'c, 5'c Tapper 14'c Con: Kelter (3/3) 1', 2', 14'; Heavirland (1/1) 5'		Try: Landry 3'c Williams 6'm Farella 7'c, 12'c Con: Landry (3/4) 4', 8', 13'	Referee: Joy Neville (Ireland)

13 May 2018	New Zealand	17–12	England	Westhills Stadium, Langford
10:26	Try: Woodman 1'm, 6'c, 11'm Con: Nathan-Wong (1/3) 6'		Try: Brown 6'c Matthews 10'm Con: Scott (1/2) 7'	Referee: Ben Crouse (South Africa)

Semifinals

13 May 2018	France	12–17 (a.e.t.)	Australia	Westhills Stadium, Langford
13:10	Try: Grassineau 8'c Pelle 11'm Con: Amedee (1/2) 9'; Cards: Amedee (yellow card) 5' to 7'		Try: Sykes 6'c Cherry 13'm Con: Sykes (1/1) 6'; Cherry (0/1)	Referee: Joy Neville (Ireland)

13 May 2018	United States	10–33	New Zealand	Westhills Stadium, Langford
13:32	Try: Gray 2'm Kelter 3'm Con: Kelter (0/2)		Try: Blyde 5'c, 10'c Brazier 7'm Goss 8'c Woodman 11'c Con: Nathan-Wong (4/5) 5', 8', 10', 12'	Referee: Adam Jones (Wales)

Third Place

13 May 2018	France	5–21	United States	Westhills Stadium, Langford
15:54	Try: Drouin 3'; Con: Amedee (0/1)		Try: Tapper 7'c Zackary 8'c Kelter 13'; Con: Heavirland (3/3) 7', 8', 14'	Referee: Aimee Barrett-Theron (South Africa)

Final

13 May 2018	Australia	0–46	New Zealand	Westhills Stadium, Langford
16:20			Try: Woodman 1'c, 7'm Tui 3'm Brazier 5'm, 14'c Williams 7'm, 10'c Goss 13'm Con: Nathan-Wong (1/5) 2'; Willison (2/3) 11', 14'	Referee: Sara Cox (England)

== Tournament placings ==
Place	Team	Points
1st place, gold medalist(s)	New Zealand	20
2nd place, silver medalist(s)	Australia	18
3rd place, bronze medalist(s)	United States	16
4	France	14
5	Canada	12
6	Ireland	10

Place	Team	Points
7	England	8
8	Fiji	6
9	Japan	4
10	Spain	3
11	Brazil	2
12	Russia	1

Source: World Rugby

== Players ==
=== Scoring leaders ===
Tries scored
Rank	Player	Tries
1	(Canada) Bianca Farella	8
2	(Australia) Emma Tonegato	7
2	Michaela Blyde	7
2	(New Zealand) Portia Woodman	7
5	(United States) Alev Kelter	6

Points scored
Rank	Player	Points
1	Alev Kelter	52
2	Bianca Farella	40
2	Montserrat Amedee	40
4	Ghislaine Landry	38
4	Luisa Tisolo	38

Source: World Rugby

=== Dream Team ===
The following seven players were selected to the tournament Dream Team at the conclusion of the tournament:

Forwards	Backs
(Ireland) Stacey Flood (Australia) Evania Pelite (New Zealand) Portia Woodman	(Canada) Charity Williams (Fiji) Luisa Tisolo (New Zealand) Michaela Blyde (France) Montserrat Amedee

== See also ==
- World Rugby Women's Sevens Series
- 2017–18 World Rugby Women's Sevens Series

Women's Sevens Series VI
Preceded by 2018 Japan Women's Sevens	2018 Canada Women's Sevens	Succeeded by 2018 France Women's Sevens
Canada Women's Sevens
Preceded by 2017 Canada Women's Sevens	2018 Canada Women's Sevens	Succeeded by 2019 Canada Women's Sevens
