= 2018 Japan Women's Sevens =

- Women's Sevens Series VI
- Host nation: Japan
- Date: 21–22 April 2018

Cup
- Champion: New Zealand
- Runner-up: France
- Third: Australia

Challenge Trophy
- Winner: United States

Tournament details
- Matches played: 34
- Tries scored: 209 (average 6.15 per match)
- Most points: (Russia) Alena Mikhaltsova (55)
- Most tries: (Russia) Alena Mikhaltsova (11)

The 2018 Japan Women's Sevens was the third tournament within the 2017–18 World Rugby Women's Sevens Series and the second edition of the Japan Women's Sevens to be played in the series. It was held over the weekend of 21–22 April 2018 at Mikuni World Stadium Kitakyushu.

== Format ==
The teams are drawn into three pools of four teams each. Each team plays every other team in their pool once. The top two teams from each pool advance to the Cup brackets while the top 2 third place teams also compete in the Cup/Plate. The other teams from each group play-off for the Challenge Trophy.

== Teams ==
Eleven core teams are participating in the tournament along with one invited team, the runner-up of the 2017 Asia Rugby Women's Sevens Series, China:

- Australia
- Canada
- China
- England
- Fiji
- France
- Ireland
- Japan
- New Zealand
- Russia
- Spain
- United States

== Pool stage ==
All times in Japan Standard Time (UTC+09:00)

=== Pool A ===
Team	Pld	W	D	L	PF	PA	PD	Pts
Spain	3	2	0	1	50	48	+2	7
Australia	3	2	0	1	78	22	+56	7
China	3	1	0	2	46	64	–18	5
Ireland	3	1	0	2	29	69	–40	5

21 April 2018	Spain	14–17	Ireland	Mikuni World Stadium Kitakyushu, Kitakyushu
11:14	Try: Bravo 6'c Casado 7'c Con: Garcia (2/2) 7', 8'		Try: Murphy-Crowe 1'm Galvin 4'c Flood 10'm Con: Mulhall (1/3) 5'	Referee: (Wales) Adam Jones

21 April 2018	Australia	33–5	China	Mikuni World Stadium Kitakyushu, Kitakyushu
11:36	Try: Sykes 2'c Du Toit 6'c Meakes 9'm Tonegato 11'c Hayes 14'c Con: Sykes (3/4) 3', 6', 11'; Brown (1/1) 14'		Try: Yan 4'm Con: Yu (0/1)	Referee: (New Zealand) Rebecca Mahoney

21 April 2018	Spain	19–17	China	Mikuni World Stadium Kitakyushu, Kitakyushu
13:58	Try: Garcia 1'm Erbina 4'c Bravo 6'; Con: Garcia (2/3) 5', 6'		Try: Wang 11'c Yan 12'm Chen 14'm Con: Yu (1/1) 11'; Yang (0/1); Chen (0/1)	Referee: (Japan) Sakurako Kawasaki

21 April 2018	Australia	31–0	Ireland	Mikuni World Stadium Kitakyushu, Kitakyushu
14:20	Try: Tonegato 2'c Cherry 7'm, 8'm Friedrichs 11'c Staples 14'c Con: Sykes (3/5) 2', 11', 14'			Referee: (Scotland) Hollie Davidson

21 April 2018	Ireland	12–24	China	Mikuni World Stadium Kitakyushu, Kitakyushu
16:42	Try: O'Flynn 4'c Heffeman 11'm Con: Mulhall (1/2) 4'		Try: Wang 2'c Chen 5'c, 9'm Yu 8'm Con: Yu (2/4) 3', 6'	Referee: (Canada) Rose LaBreche

21 April 2018	Australia	14–17	Spain	Mikuni World Stadium Kitakyushu, Kitakyushu
17:04	Try: Hayes 3'c Meakes 6'c Con: Brown (2/2) 3', 6'		Try: Martinez 7'c, 7'm Ribera 14'm Con: Garcia (1/3) 7'	Referee: (South Africa) Ben Crouse

=== Pool B ===
Team	Pld	W	D	L	PF	PA	PD	Pts
New Zealand	3	3	0	0	107	24	+83	9
France	3	2	0	1	76	43	+33	7
United States	3	1	0	2	57	84	–27	5
Japan	3	0	0	3	27	116	–89	3

21 April 2018	France	36–0	United States	Mikuni World Stadium Kitakyushu, Kitakyushu
11:58	Try: Guerin 0'c Amedee 4'c Grassineau 7'm Le Pesq 11'c, 12'm Ciofani 14'm Con: Amedee (2/4) 1', 4'; Le Pesq (1/2) 12'		Cards: Gray (yellow card) 10' to 12'	Referee: (Scotland) Hollie Davidson

21 April 2018	New Zealand	38–5	Japan	Mikuni World Stadium Kitakyushu, Kitakyushu
12:20	Try: Woodman 0'c Woodman 3'm Blyde 7'c, 9'c Goss 10'c Waaka 13'm Con: Nathan-Wong (4/5) 1', 7', 9', 11'; Willison (0/1)		Try: Bativakalolo 12'm Con: Nakamura (0/1)	Referee: (Canada) Rose LaBreche

21 April 2018	France	33–5	Japan	Mikuni World Stadium Kitakyushu, Kitakyushu
14:42	Try: Grassineau 0'c Amedee 2'm Drouin 5'c Ciofani 10'c Bertrand 11'c Con: Le Pesq (4/5) 0', 5', 10', 12'		Try: Hirano 14'm Con: Nakamura (0/1); Cards: Nakamura (yellow card) 4' to 6'	Referee: (South Africa) Ben Crouse

21 April 2018	New Zealand	31–12	United States	Mikuni World Stadium Kitakyushu, Kitakyushu
15:04	Try: Woodman 3'c William 6'c Blyde 7'c Broughton 12'm Baker 14'm Con: Willison (3/3) 3', 6', 7'; Nathan-Wong (0/2)		Try: Gray 2'c Tapper 7'm Con: Kelter (1/2) 2'	Referee: (Spain) Alhambra Nievas

21 April 2018	United States	45–17	Japan	Mikuni World Stadium Kitakyushu, Kitakyushu
17:26	Try: Tapper 0'm, 5'c, 7'c Kelter 2'c Kelter 7'c Zackary 9'c Thomas 10'm Con: Kelter (3/4) 2', 7', 7'; Heavirland (2/3) 5', 9'		Try: Tanaka 4'c Koide 11'm Bativakalolo 14'm Con: Nakamura (1/3) 4'	Referee: (Wales) Adam Jones

21 April 2018	New Zealand	38–7	France	Mikuni World Stadium Kitakyushu, Kitakyushu
17:48	Try: Woodman 2'm, 3'c, 6'm Broughton 7'c Waaka 12'c Baker 14'c Con: Nathan-Wong (3/5) 4', 7', 12'; Willison (1/1) 14'; Cards: Broughton (yellow card) 7' to 9'		Try: Amedee 9'c Con: Amedee (1/1) 9'; Cards: Bertrand (yellow card) 14' to 14'	Referee: (Ireland) Joy Neville

=== Pool C ===
Team	Pld	W	D	L	PF	PA	PD	Pts
Fiji	3	2	0	1	74	55	+19	7
Russia	3	2	0	1	41	44	–3	7
England	3	1	0	2	43	67	–24	5
Canada	3	1	0	2	62	54	+8	5

21 April 2018	Russia	17–10	England	Mikuni World Stadium Kitakyushu, Kitakyushu
10:30	Try: Mikhaltsova 1'm Khamidova 12'm Zdrokova 14'c Con: Lushina (1/1) 14'; Seredina (0/2)		Try: Thompson 3'm Fisher 6'm Con: Hunt (0/2)	Referee: (Japan) Sakurako Kawasaki

21 April 2018	Canada	38–14	Fiji	Mikuni World Stadium Kitakyushu, Kitakyushu
10:52	Try: Crossley 0'c Farella 3'c Greenshieldls 6'c Darling 7'm Nicholas 7'm Williams 12'c Con: Greenshields (3/4) 0', 4', 6'; Nicholas (1/2) 12'		Try: Siata 2'c Tisolo 10'c Con: Riwai (1/1) 2'; Tisolo (1/1) 10'; Cards: Riwai (yellow card) 5' to 7'; Siata (yellow card) 7' to 9'; Naiqato (yellow card) 14' to 14'	Referee: (South Africa) Ben Crouse

21 April 2018	Russia	5–29	Fiji	Mikuni World Stadium Kitakyushu, Kitakyushu
13:14	Try: Mikhaltsova 4'm Con: Lushina (0/1); Cards: Zdrokova (yellow card) 9' to 11'		Try: Naimasi 2'c, 12'm Roqica 7'c, 7'm Ravisa 9'm Con: Naimasi (2/2) 2', 7'; Riwai (0/2); Tinai (0/1)	Referee: (Spain) Alhambra Nievas

21 April 2018	Canada	19–21	England	Mikuni World Stadium Kitakyushu, Kitakyushu
13:36	Try: Nicholas 4'c Darling 8'm Farella 11'c Con: Nicholas (1/1) 4'; Greenshields (1/2) 12'; Cards: Apps (yellow card) 2' to 4'; Greenshields (yellow card) 6' to 8'		Try: Breach 0'c Fisher 6'c Scott 13'c Con: Scott (2/2) 1', 6'; Hunt (1/1) 14'	Referee: (Ireland) Joy Neville

21 April 2018	England	12–31	Fiji	Mikuni World Stadium Kitakyushu, Kitakyushu
15:58	Try: Breach 8'm Wood 13'c Con: Hunt (1/2) 13'		Try: Ravisa 2'c, 9'm Riwai 4'c Naimasi 7'c, 12'm Con: Riwai (3/3) 2', 4', 7'; Naimasi (0/1); Tisolo (0/1)	Referee: (Wales) Adam Jones

21 April 2018	Canada	5–19	Russia	Mikuni World Stadium Kitakyushu, Kitakyushu
16:20	Try: Apps 0'm Con: Greenshields (0/1)		Try: Lushina 5'c Mikhaltsova 11'c Perestiak 14'm Con: Lushina (2/3) 6', 11'	Referee: (New Zealand) Rebecca Mahoney

== Knockout stage ==
=== Challenge Trophy ===
Semi-finals
22 April 2018 – 11:58 – Mikuni World Stadium Kitakyushu
United States	34
Japan	14
22 April 2018 – 12:20 – Mikuni World Stadium Kitakyushu
Canada	19
Ireland	24

Challenge Trophy Final
22 April 2018 – 15:04 – Mikuni World Stadium Kitakyushu
United States	24
Ireland	19
11th Place
22 April 2018 – 15:26 – Mikuni World Stadium Kitakyushu
Japan	14
Canada	33

Matches

Semifinals

22 April 2018	United States	34–7	Japan	Mikuni World Stadium Kitakyushu, Kitakyushu
11:58	Try: Zackary 6'; Heavirland 7'm Kelter 7'm Carlyle 9'c Thomas 11'c Gray 13'm Con: Kelter (2/4) 9', 11'; Heavirland (0/2)		Try: Hirano 2'c, 14'c Con: Nakamura (2/2) 2', 14'; Cards: Otake (yellow card) 7' to 9'	Referee: (Wales) Adam Jones

22 April 2018	Canada	19–24 (a.e.t.)	Ireland	Mikuni World Stadium Kitakyushu, Kitakyushu
12:20	Try: Farella 6'c Darling 9'm Greenshields 12'c Con: Greenshields (2/3) 6', 12'; Cards: Darling (yellow card) 2' to 4'		Try: Murphy-Crowe 7'c Fitzhenry 10'; Mulhall 14'c Baker 15'; Con: Mulhall (2/2) 7', 14'; Higgins (0/1); Cards: Mulhall (yellow card) 8' to 10'	Referee: (New Zealand) Rebecca Mahoney

11th Place

22 April 2018	Japan	14–33	Canada	Mikuni World Stadium Kitakyushu, Kitakyushu
15:04	Try: Nagata 0'c Tateyama 3'c Con: Nakamura (2/2) 1', 3'		Try: Williams 4'c Watcham-Roy 6'm Darling 7'c Lukan 10'c Farella 12'; Con: Nicholas (2/2) 4', 12'; Greenshields (1/1) 7'; Lukan (1/2) 10'	Referee: (South Africa) Ben Crouse

Challenge Trophy Final

22 April 2018	United States	24–19 (a.e.t.)	Ireland	Mikuni World Stadium Kitakyushu, Kitakyushu
15:26	Try: Heavirland 3'c Tapper 9'c Kelter 13'm Heavirland 15'; Con: Heavirland (1/1) 3' Kelter (1/2) 9'		Try: Galvin 5'm Higgins 7'm Mulhall 14'c Con: Mulhall (2/3) 8', 14'	Referee: (Japan) Sakurako Kawasaki

=== 5th place ===
Semi-finals
22 April 2018 – 13:36 – Mikuni World Stadium Kitakyushu
China	19
Fiji	24
22 April 2018 – 13:58 – Mikuni World Stadium Kitakyushu
Russia	41
England	0

5th-place final
22 April 2018 – 16:42 – Mikuni World Stadium Kitakyushu
Fiji	7
Russia	30
7th Place
22 April 2018 – 16:20 – Mikuni World Stadium Kitakyushu
China	5
England	36

Matches

Semi-finals

22 April 2018	China	19–24	Fiji	Mikuni World Stadium Kitakyushu, Kitakyushu
13:36	Try: Chen 1'm, 9'c Yang 5'c Con: Chen (2/2) 5', 9'; Yang (0/1); Cards: Gao (yellow card) 11' to 13'		Try: Ravisa 6'c Naiobasali 12'c Siata 13'm Naimasi 14'; Con: Riwai (1/1) 7'; Nagasau (1/2) 12'; Tisolo (0/1); Cards: Nagasau (yellow card) 7' to 9'; Tisolo (yellow card) 10' to 12'	Referee: (Japan) Sakurako Kawasaki

22 April 2018	Russia	41–0	England	Mikuni World Stadium Kitakyushu, Kitakyushu
13:58	Try: Mikhaltsova 1'c, 3'm, 11'm, 13'm, 14'm Zdrokova 6'c Khamidova 9'c Con: Lushina (3/5) 1', 7', 9'; Kulkova (0/2)			Referee: (South Africa) Ben Crouse

7th Place

22 April 2018	China	5–36	England	Mikuni World Stadium Kitakyushu, Kitakyushu
16:20	Try: Yu 6'm Con: Yang (0/1)		Try: Fleming 0'c Thompson 2'm Fisher 4'c Wood 8'm Breach 12'm Fleetwood 14'; Con: Hunt (2/4) 0', 4'; Scott (1/2) 14'	Referee: (Scotland) Hollie Davidson

5th-place final

22 April 2018	Fiji	7–30	Russia	Mikuni World Stadium Kitakyushu, Kitakyushu
16:42	Try: Naiobasali 3'c Con: Riwai (1/1) 4'		Try: Perestiak 3'm Mikhaltsova 5'm, 14'm Khamidova 7'm, 13'; Zdrokova 11'm Con: Lushina (0/6)	Referee: (New Zealand) Rebecca Mahoney

=== Cup ===
Quarter-finals
22 April 2018 – 10:30 – Mikuni World Stadium Kitakyushu
New Zealand	50
China	0
22 April 2018 – 10:52 – Mikuni World Stadium Kitakyushu
Fiji	7
Australia	31
22 April 2018 – 11:14 – Mikuni World Stadium Kitakyushu
France	29
Russia	5
22 April 2018 – 11:36 – Mikuni World Stadium Kitakyushu
Spain	7
England	5

Semi-finals
22 April 2018 – 14:20 – Mikuni World Stadium Kitakyushu
New Zealand	17
Australia	12
22 April 2018 – 14:42 – Mikuni World Stadium Kitakyushu
France	21
Spain	0

Cup Final
22 April 2018 – 17:30 – Mikuni World Stadium Kitakyushu
New Zealand	24
France	12
Bronze-medal match
22 April 2018 – 17:04 – Mikuni World Stadium Kitakyushu
Australia	19
Spain	5

Matches

Quarter-finals

22 April 2018	New Zealand	50–0	China	Mikuni World Stadium Kitakyushu, Kitakyushu
10:30	Try: Blyde 0'm Blyde 3'c Brazier 5'm, 14'c Broughton 7'c Baker 8'c Goss 10'm Willison 13'c Con: Nathan-Wong (3/5) 4', 7', 9'; Willison (2/2) 13', 14'			Referee: (Canada) Rose LaBreche

22 April 2018	Fiji	7–31	Australia	Mikuni World Stadium Kitakyushu, Kitakyushu
10:52	Try: Riwai 5'c Con: Riwai (1/1) 5'; Cards: Siata (yellow card) 1' to 3'		Try: Hayes 1'm Tonegato 2'm, 10'c Sykes 7'c Pelite 8'c Con: Sykes (3/5) 7', 9', 10'; Cards: Cherry (yellow card) 5' to 7'	Referee: (Spain) Alhambra Nievas

22 April 2018	France	29–5	Russia	Mikuni World Stadium Kitakyushu, Kitakyushu
11:14	Try: Pelle 1'm, 11'c Amedee 2'm Horta 9'm Le Pesq 13'c Con: Le Pesq (2/3) 12', 13'; Amedee (0/2)		Try: Mikhaltsova 6'm Con: Lushina (0/1)	Referee: (Ireland) Joy Neville

22 April 2018	Spain	7–5	England	Mikuni World Stadium Kitakyushu, Kitakyushu
11:36	Try: Ribera 11'c Con: Garcia (1/1) 12'		Try: Fleming 6'm Con: Hunt (0/1)	Referee: (Scotland) Hollie Davidson

Semi-finals

22 April 2018	New Zealand	17–12	Australia	Mikuni World Stadium Kitakyushu, Kitakyushu
14:20	Try: Broughton 7'm Blyde 9'm Nathan-Wong 12'c Con: Nathan-Wong (1/3) 13'		Try: Pelite 1'm Tonegato 4'c Con: Sykes (1/2) 4'	Referee: (Spain) Alhambra Nievas

22 April 2018	France	21–0	Spain	Mikuni World Stadium Kitakyushu, Kitakyushu
14:42	Try: Horta 6'c Amedee 10'c Konde 14'; Con: Amedee (2/2) 7', 10', 14'			Referee: (Wales) Adam Jones

Bronze-medal match

22 April 2018	Australia	19–5	Spain	Mikuni World Stadium Kitakyushu, Kitakyushu
17:04	Try: Pelite 3'm Tonegato 11'c Cherry 14'c Con: Sykes (2/3) 11', 14'		Try: Algar 2'	Referee: (Canada) Rose LaBreche

Cup Final

22 April 2018	New Zealand	24–12	France	Mikuni World Stadium Kitakyushu, Kitakyushu
17:30	Try: Blyde 0'c Fitzpatrick 6'm Woodman 11'c Nathan-Wong 13'; Con: Nathan-Wong (2/4) 1', 12'; Cards: Broughton (yellow card) 8' to 10'		Try: Grassineau 5'c Amedee 9'; Con: Le Pesq (1/2) 5'	Referee: (Ireland) Joy Neville

== Tournament placings ==
Place	Team	Points
1st place, gold medalist(s)	New Zealand	20
2nd place, silver medalist(s)	France	18
3rd place, bronze medalist(s)	Australia	16
4	Spain	14
5	Russia	12
6	Fiji	10

Place	Team	Points
7	England	8
8	China	6
9	United States	4
10	Ireland	3
11	Canada	2
12	Japan	1

Source: World Rugby

== Players ==
=== Scoring leaders ===
Tries scored
Rank	Player	Tries
1	(Russia) Alena Mikhaltsova	11
2	(New Zealand) Michaela Blyde	7
	(New Zealand) Portia Woodman	7
4	(Australia) Emma Tonegato	6
	(France) Montserrat Amedee	6

Points scored
Rank	Player	Points
1	(Russia) Alena Mikhaltsova	55
2	(France) Montserrat Amedee	38
3	(New Zealand) Tyla Nathan-Wong	36
4	(France) Jade Le Pesq	35
	(New Zealand) Michaela Blyde	35

Source: World Rugby

==== Dream Team ====
The following seven players were selected to the tournament Dream Team at the conclusion of the tournament:

Forwards	Backs
(France) Montserrat Amedee (China) Chen Keyi (Australia) Evania Pelite	(Spain) María Ribera (Russia) Alena Mikhaltsova (Spain) Patricia García (New Zealand) Sarah Goss

== See also ==
- World Rugby Women's Sevens Series
- 2017–18 World Rugby Women's Sevens Series

World Sevens Series VI
Preceded by 2018 Sydney Women's Sevens	2018 Japan Women's Sevens	Succeeded by 2018 Canada Women's Sevens
Japan Women's Sevens
Preceded by 2017 Japan Women's Sevens	2018 Japan Women's Sevens	Succeeded by 2019 Japan Women's Sevens
