= Miriama Naiobasali =

Fijian football and rugby sevens player

Personal information
- Date of birth: 30 December 1995 (age 30)
- Height: 1.79 m (5 ft 10 in)

Senior career*
| Years | Team | Apps | (Gls) |
- Lautoka

International career^{‡}
| 2015 | Fiji | 1+ | (0+) |
- * Club domestic league appearances and goals ‡ National team caps and goals as of 8 July 2015.

Miriama Naiobasali (born 30 December 1995) is a Fijian former footballer and current rugby sevens player. She has been a member of the Fiji women's national football team and the Fiji women's national rugby sevens team.

== Early life ==
Naiobasali was raised in Naruto, Waimaro, Naitasiri.

== Football career ==
=== Club career ===
Naiobasali has played for Lautoka in Fiji.

=== International career ===
Naiobasali capped for Fiji at senior level during the 2015 Pacific Games.

== Rugby sevens career ==
Naiobasali represented Fiji at the 2018 Commonwealth Games.

== Personal life ==
Naiobasali is fluent in English and Fijian.
