= 2017–18 World Rugby Women's Sevens Series =

Rugby series edition

World Rugby Women's Sevens Series VI
- Hosts: United Arab Emirates; Australia; Japan; Canada; France
- Date: 30 November 2017 – 10 June 2018
- Nations: 16 teams

Final positions
- Champions: Australia
- Runners-up: New Zealand
- Third: France

Series details
- Top try scorer: Portia Woodman (215)
- Top point scorer: Portia Woodman (43)

The 2017–18 World Rugby Women's Sevens Series was the sixth edition of the global circuit for women's national rugby sevens teams, organised by World Rugby. Five tournament events were scheduled on the 2017–18 circuit and twelve teams competed in each tournament.

== Format ==
Twelve teams compete at each event. The top-ranked teams at each tournament play off for a Cup, with gold, silver and bronze medals also awarded to the first three teams. Lower-ranked teams at each tournament play off for a Challenge Trophy. The overall winner of the series was determined by points gained from the standings across all events in the season.

== Teams ==
The "core teams" qualified to participate in all series events for the 2017–18 series were:

- Australia
- Canada
- England
- Fiji
- France
- Ireland
- New Zealand
- Russia
- Spain
- United States

One additional core team qualified through winning the 2017 Hong Kong Women's Sevens:

- Japan

== Events ==
There were five tournaments in 2017–18:

2017–18 Itinerary
Leg	Stadium	City	Dates	Winner
Dubai	The Sevens	Dubai	30 November – 1 December 2017	Australia
Australia	Sydney Football Stadium	Sydney	26–28 January 2018	Australia
Japan	Mikuni World Stadium	Kitakyushu	21–22 April 2018	New Zealand
Canada	Westhills Stadium	Langford	12–13 May 2018	New Zealand
France	Stade Jean-Bouin	Paris	8–10 June 2018	New Zealand

== Standings ==
Final standings for the 2017–18 series:

2017–18 World Rugby Women's Sevens – Series VI
Pos.	Event Team	Dubai	Sydney	Kitakyushu	Langford	Paris	Points total	Points difference
1	Australia	20	20	16	18	18	92	483
2	New Zealand	12	18	20	20	20	90	750
3	France	10	12	18	14	14	68	236
4	Canada	14	16	2	12	16	60	166
5	United States	18	6	4	16	12	56	14
6	Russia	16	14	12	1	3	46	–84
7	Spain	8	10	14	3	8	43	–256
8	England	6	4	8	8	6	32	–87
9	Fiji	2	3	10	6	10	31	–124
10	Ireland	4	8	3	10	4	29	–122
11	Japan	1	2	1	4	2	10	–356
12	China	–	–	6	–	–	6	–104
13	South Africa	3	–	–	–	–	3	–82
14	Brazil	–	–	–	2	–	2	–103
15	Wales	–	–	–	–	1	1	–114
16	Papua New Guinea	–	1	–	–	–	1	–217

Source: World Rugby

Event medalists
Gold	Event Champions
Silver	Event Runner-ups
Bronze	Event Third place finishers
Qualification for the 2018–19 World Rugby Women's Sevens
No colour	Core team in 2017–18 and re-qualified as a core team for the 2018–19
Pink	Relegated as the lowest placed core team at the end of the 2017–18 World Rugby Sevens Series
Yellow	Not a core team

== Placings summary ==
Tallies of top four tournament placings during the 2017–18 series, by team:

Team	(gold) Gold	(silver) Silver	(bronze) Bronze	Fourth	Total
Australia	2	2	1	–	5
New Zealand	3	1	–	–	4
United States	–	1	1	–	2
France	–	1	–	2	3
Canada	–	–	2	1	3
Russia	–	–	1	1	2
Spain	–	–	–	1	1
Totals	5	5	5	5	20

== Tournaments ==
=== Dubai ===
Event	Winners	Score	Finalists	Semifinalists
Cup	Australia	34–0	United States	Russia (Bronze); Canada
5th Place	New Zealand	24–0	France	Spain (7th); England
Challenge Trophy	Ireland	24–7	South Africa	Fiji (11th); Japan

=== Sydney ===
Event	Winners	Score	Finalists	Semifinalists
Cup	Australia	31–0	New Zealand	Canada (Bronze); Russia
5th Place	France	19–5	Spain	Ireland (7th); United States
Challenge Trophy	England	29–10	Fiji	Japan (11th); Papua New Guinea

=== Kitakyushu ===
Event	Winners	Score	Finalists	Semifinalists
Cup	New Zealand	24–12	France	Australia (Bronze); Spain
5th Place	Russia	30–7	Fiji	England (7th); China
Challenge Trophy	United States	24–19 (a.e.t.)	Ireland	Canada (11th); Japan

=== Langford ===
Event	Winners	Score	Finalists	Semifinalists
Cup	New Zealand	46–0	Australia	United States (Bronze); France
5th Place	Canada	29–12	Ireland	England (7th); Fiji
Challenge Trophy	Japan	26–21	Spain	Brazil (11th); Russia

=== Paris ===
Event	Winners	Score	Finalists	Semifinalists
Cup	New Zealand	33-7	Australia	Canada (Bronze); France
5th Place	United States	28-7	Fiji	Spain (7th); England
Challenge Trophy	Ireland	10-5	Russia	Japan (11th); Wales

== Players ==
=== Scoring leaders ===
Tries scored
Rank	Player	Tries
1	(New Zealand) Portia Woodman	43
2	(New Zealand) Michaela Blyde	37
3	(Australia) Emma Tonegato	26
3	(United States) Naya Tapper	26
5	(Russia) Alena Mikhaltsova	24

Points scored
Rank	Player	Points
1	(New Zealand) Portia Woodman	215
2	(New Zealand) Michaela Blyde	185
3	(Australia) Emma Sykes (rugby union)	172
4	(United States) Alev Kelter	168
5	(New Zealand) Tyla Nathan-Wong	159

Updated: 10 June 2018

=== Awards ===
Player awards
Tour Leg	Impact player		Ref.
Tour Leg	Player	Points	Ref.
Dubai	Alena Mikhaltsova	61	
Sydney	Baizat Khamidova	52	
Kitakyushu	Alena Mikhaltsova	60	
Langford	Camille Grassineau	56	
Paris	Charlotte Caslick	72	

Total impact player points
Pos	Player	T	B	O	C	Total
1	Michaela Blyde	58	44	20	107	229
2	Chiharu Nakamura	64	15	41	101	221
3	Camille Grassineau	115	20	14	71	220
3	Lucy Mulhall	95	11	17	97	220
5	Alena Mikhaltsova	58	36	25	94	213
6	Alev Kelter	79	26	10	97	212
6	Emma Tonegato	60	39	12	101	212
8	Stacey Flood	67	25	13	105	210
9	Amee-Leigh Murphy-Crowe	80	28	6	83	197
10	Patricia García	53	21	16	102	192

Updated: 10 June 2018

== See also ==
- 2017–18 World Rugby Sevens Series (for men)
