= Alena Tiron =

Russian rugby union player (born 1993)

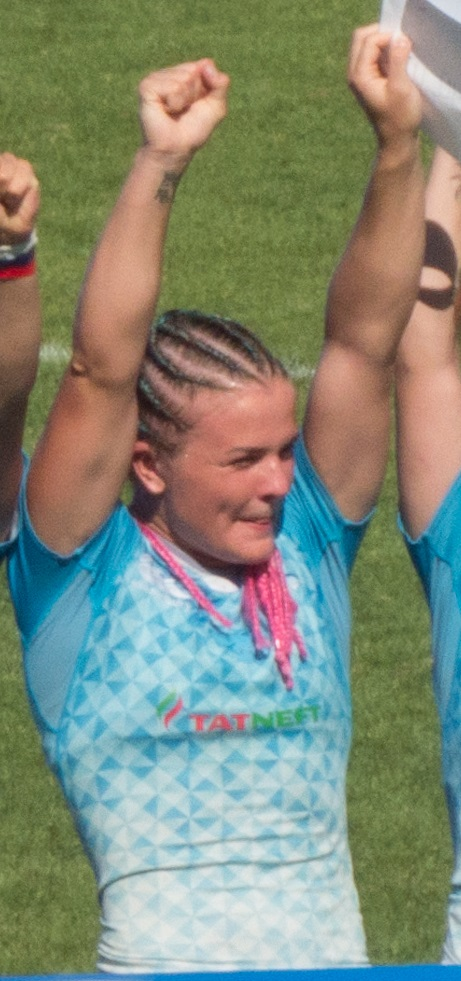
- Alena Tiron at Malemort Sevens 2017
- Full name: Alena Dimitrievna Tiron
- Born: Alena Dimitrievna Bogacheva; 8 December 1993 (age 32) Novosibirsk, Russia
- Height: 171 cm (5 ft 7 in)
- Weight: 75 kg (165 lb; 11 st 11 lb)
- University: Siberian Federal University

Rugby union career
- Position: back (fly-half / scrum-half)
- Current team: CSKA Moscow
Senior career
Years	Team	Apps	(Points)
2013—2019	Yenisey-STM Krasnoyarsk		(0)
2020—	CSKA Moscow		(0)
International career
Years	Team	Apps	(Points)
2016	Russia		(0)
National sevens team
Years	Team		Comps
2013—	Russia sevens		
Medal record
Women's rugby sevens
Representing Russia
Rugby Europe Women's Sevens
Gold medal – first place	2014
Gold medal – first place	2016
Gold medal – first place	2017
Gold medal – first place	2018
Gold medal – first place	2019
Gold medal – first place	2021
Silver medal – second place	2015
Rugby Europe Women's Championship
Bronze medal – third place	2016 Madrid

Alena Dimitrievna Tiron (Russian: Алёна Димитриевна Тирон), née Alena Bogacheva (Russian: Алёна Богачёва); born 8 December 1993) is a Russian female rugby union and rugby sevens player which represents Russia in World Rugby Women's Sevens Series and Rugby Europe Women's Sevens.

== Biography ==
=== Rugby player career ===
Alena came to rugby from track and field while having silver and bronze medals of 2012 Russia Championship in relay (400+300+200+100 and 800+400+200+100 respectively). She declined the invitation to rugby union from Yenisey-STM manager in 2011, but two years later, in March 2013 after graduating from sports school she moved to Krasnoyarsk and began training. On 1 May 2013 she became the player of Yenisey-STM after offer from a coach Maxim Zaltsman. She graduated from Siberian Federal University and won silver medal of III Russian Summer Youth Spartakiade.

She made her debut in Russia sevens national team in the end of 2013 before 2013 Dubai Women's Sevens, but did not take part in the competition due to heel injury. In January 2014 she joined the training and became the main squad player. Her debut was on the very next World Rugby Women's Sevens tournament. She is a five-time European Grand Prix winner: in 2014 she played all matches without substitutions and won her first gold medal. Due to serious injury she withdrawn from 2016 Rugby World Women's Sevens Olympic Repechage Tournament, where Russia has lost the final place at the Olympic tournament to Spain women's national rugby sevens team.

In 2017 Alena was nominated for the DHL Impact Player award. At the end of 2017–18 season she had 84 caps and 366 points (including 70 tries) and after 2018–19 season she reached 120 caps and 451 points (87 tries and 8 conversions).

=== Achievements ===
- Rugby Europe Women's Sevens champion: 2014, 2016, 2017, 2018, 2019, 2021
- Rugby Europe Women's Sevens runner-up: 2015
- 2015 Dubai Women's Sevens All-Star team player
- DHL Impact Player
  - 2017 Dubai Women's Sevens DHL Impact Player
  - 2018 Japan Women's Sevens DHL Impact Player
- Rugby Europe Women's Championship bronze medalist: 2016
- 2017–18 World Rugby Women's Sevens Series DHL Impact Player

=== Personal life ===
Alena's mother has a degree in Mathematics.

Alena was married to Alexey Mikhaltsov, a Russian rugby player. On 12 October 2019, Alena married Ilya Tiron, RC Moscow Torpedo and Russia national team video analyst player. Alena's bright appearance (hairstyle and pigtails) is well known in rugby world.
