= 2017 Dubai Women's Sevens =

- Women's Sevens Series VI
- Host nation: United Arab Emirates
- Date: 30 November – 1 December 2017

Cup
- Champion: Australia
- Runner-up: United States
- Third: Russia

Challenge Trophy
- Winner: Ireland

Tournament details
- Matches played: 34
- Tries scored: 189 (average 5.56 per match)
- Most points: (New Zealand) Portia Woodman (45)
- Most tries: (New Zealand) Portia Woodman (9)

The 2017 Dubai Sevens was the first tournament within the 2017–18 World Rugby Women's Sevens Series. It was on 30 November to 1 December at The Sevens Stadium in Dubai, United Arab Emirates.

== Format ==
The teams are drawn into three pools of four teams each. Each team plays every other team in their pool once. The top two teams from each pool advance to the Cup brackets while the top 2 third place teams also compete in the Cup/Plate. The other teams from each group play-off for the Challenge Trophy.

== Teams ==
Eleven core teams are participating in the tournament along with one invited team, the winner of the 2017 Women's Africa Cup Sevens, South Africa:

- Australia
- Canada
- England
- Fiji
- France
- Ireland
- Japan
- New Zealand
- Russia
- Spain
- United States
- South Africa

== Pool stage ==
All times in UAE Standard Time (UTC+4:00)

Key to colours in group tables
Teams that advanced to the Cup Quarterfinal

=== Pool A ===
Team	Pld	W	D	L	PF	PA	PD	Pts
New Zealand	3	3	0	0	113	21	+92	9
France	3	2	0	1	55	50	+5	7
United States	3	1	0	2	50	79	–29	5
South Africa	3	0	0	3	20	88	–68	3

30 November 2017	United States	17–19	France	The Sevens, Dubai
13:28	Try: Kelter 1'; Carlyle 11'; Tapper 14'; Con: Kelter (1/2) 2'; Heavirland (0/1)		Try: Horta 3'; Izar 6'; Bertrand 13'; Con: Biscarat 4'; Izar (1/2) 13'	Referee: (South Africa) Aimee Barrett-Theron

30 November 2017	New Zealand	40–0	South Africa	The Sevens, Dubai
13:50	Try: Blyde 1'; Woodman 4'; Broughton 6'; McAlister 10'; Fitzpatrick 13'; Waaka 14'; Con: Nathan-Wong (4/4) 2', 5', 6', 10'; Whata (1/2) 13'; Cards: Waaka (yellow card) 8' to 10'			Referee: (Ireland) Joy Neville

30 November 2017	United States	19–15	South Africa	The Sevens, Dubai
16:24	Try: Tapper 6', 14'; Gustaitis 9'; Con: Heavirland (2/3) 6', 14'		Try: Mpupha 3', 7'; Grain 13'; Con: Roos (0/3)	Referee: (Spain) Alhambra Nievas

30 November 2017	New Zealand	28–7	France	The Sevens, Dubai
16:46	Try: Woodman 3', 14'; Blyde 7'; McAlister 8'; Con: Nathan-Wong (3/3) 4', 7', 9', 14'		Try: Bertrand 12'; Con: Biscarat (1/1) 12'	Referee: (England) Sara Cox

30 November 2017	France	29–5	South Africa	The Sevens, Dubai
19:21	Try: Grassineau 1'; Amedee 3', 14', 14'+ Neissen 5'; Con: Le Pesq (2/5) 5', 14'		Try: Grain 7'; Con: Pienaar (0/1)	Referee: (Scotland) Hollie Davidson

30 November 2017	New Zealand	45–14	United States	The Sevens, Dubai
19:43	Try: Blyde 1'; Woodman 3', 9'; Tui 6'; Goss 7'; McAlister 14'; Broughton 14'; Con: Nathan-Wong (4/5) 2', 4', 7', 10'; Whata (1/2) 14'		Try: Tapper 5'; Heavirland 12'; Con: Kelter (2/2) 6', 12'	Referee: (South Africa) Ben Crouse

=== Pool B ===
Team	Pld	W	D	L	PF	PA	PD	Pts
Australia	3	3	0	0	80	19	+61	9
Russia	3	2	0	1	65	46	+19	7
England	3	1	0	2	48	53	–5	5
Japan	3	0	0	3	14	89	–75	3

30 November 2017	Russia	17–15	England	The Sevens, Dubai
12:44	Try: Zdrokova 7', 14'; Mikhaltsova 14'; Con: Lushina (1/1) 7'; Kukina (0/1); Cards: Khamidova (yellow card) 8' to 10'		Try: Thompson 2' 7'; Fisher 9'; Con: Jones (0/2); Aitchison (0/1)	Referee: (Spain) Alhambra Nievas

30 November 2017	Australia	27–0	Japan	The Sevens, Dubai
13:06	Try: Cherry 2'; Tonegato 3'; Caslick 5'; Staples 9', 12'; Con: Williams (0/3); Sykes (1/2) 9'			Referee: (Scotland) Hollie Davidson

30 November 2017	Russia	36–0	Japan	The Sevens, Dubai
15:40	Try: Zdrokova 2', 6', 13'; Bystrova 4'; Bobkova 7'; Mikhaltsova 8'; Con: Mikhaltsova (1/1) 4'; Kukina (1/3) 7'; Lushina (1/2) 14'			Referee: (South Africa) Ben Crouse

30 November 2017	Australia	22–7	England	The Sevens, Dubai
16:02	Try: Du Toit 2'; Sykes 7', 11'; Pelite 13'; Con: Sykes (1/4) 7'		Try: Fleming 1'; Con: Jones 2'	Referee: (Ireland) Joy Neville

30 November 2017	England	26–14	Japan	The Sevens, Dubai
18:37	Try: Wilson-Hardy 2', 7'; Aitchison 4'; Matthews 10'; Con: Jones (2/3) 4', 7'; Scott (1/1) 10'; Cards: Scott (yellow card) 14' to 14'		Try: Kozasa 13'; Nagata 14'; Con: Nakamura (1/1) 13'; Hirano (1/1) 14'	Referee: (Italy) Beatrice Benvenuti

30 November 2017	Australia	31–12	Russia	The Sevens, Dubai
18:59	Try: Du Toit 4'; Tonegato 6' 7' 9'; Staples 14'; Con: Sykes (3/5) 5' 9', 14'; Cards: McGregor (yellow card) 14' to 14'		Try: Khamidova 2'; Penalty Try 14'; Con: Kukina (0/1); Cards: Noritsina (yellow card) 14' to 14'	Referee: (Wales) Adam Jones

=== Pool C ===
Team	Pld	W	D	L	PF	PA	PD	Pts
Canada	3	3	0	0	81	14	+67	9
Spain	3	2	0	1	36	31	+5	7
Ireland	3	1	0	2	27	60	–33	5
Fiji	3	0	0	3	31	70	–39	3

30 November 2017	Fiji	12–20	Ireland	The Sevens, Dubai
12:00	Try: Ravisa 12', 14'; Con: Cavuru (1/2) 15'		Try: Murphy-Crowe 2'; Baxter 3'; Fitzhenry 8'; Flood 10'; Con: Mulhall (0/4)	Referee: (England) Sara Cox

30 November 2017	Canada	19–0	Spain	The Sevens, Dubai
12:22	Try: Landry 8'; Greenshields 10', 13'; Con: Landry (2/3) 9', 11'			Referee: (South Africa) Ben Crouse

30 November 2017	Fiji	5–19	Spain	The Sevens, Dubai
14:56	Try: Siata 10'; Con: Nagasau (0/1)		Try: Erbina 3'; Garcia 5'; Casado 12'; Con: Garcia (2/3) 4', 12'	Referee: (Italy) Beatrice Benvenuti

30 November 2017	Canada	31–0	Ireland	The Sevens, Dubai
15:18	Try: Darling 2'; Landry 4'; Benn 7'; Nicholas 8'; Levale 14'; Con: Landry (2/3) 4', 7'; Nicholas (1/2) 9'			Referee: (Wales) Adam Jones

30 November 2017	Ireland	7–17	Spain	The Sevens, Dubai
17:53	Try: Flood 4'; Con: Mulhall (1/1) 5'		Try: Erbina 3'; Echebarria 7'; Echebarria 9'; Con: Garcia (1/3) 7'	Referee: (South Africa) Aimee Barrett-Theron

30 November 2017	Canada	31–14	Fiji	The Sevens, Dubai
18:15	Try: Greenshields 5', 9', 11'; Kish 7'; Chown 13'; Con: Landry (1/2) 7'; Nicholas (2/3) 10', 12'		Try: Tisolo 3'; Naimasi 14'; Con: Cavuru (1/1) 3'; Tinai (1/1) 14'; Cards: Solikoviti (yellow card) 5' to 7'	Referee: (Ireland) Joy Neville

== Knockout round ==
=== Challenge Trophy ===
Semi-finals
1 December 2017 – 10:28 – The Sevens, Dubai
Ireland	38
Japan	5
1 December 2017 – 10:50 – The Sevens, Dubai
Fiji	14
South Africa	17

Challenge Trophy Final
1 December 2017 – 16:25 – The Sevens, Dubai
Ireland	24
South Africa	7
11th Place
1 December 2017 – 14:40 – The Sevens, Dubai
Japan	15
Fiji	17

Matches

Semi-finals

1 December 2017	Ireland	38–5	Japan	The Sevens, Dubai
10:28	Try: Nic A Bhaird 1'; Galvin 4', 12'; Murphy-Crowe 5'; Mulhall 10', 14'; Con: Mulhall (4/6) 2', 4', 12', 14'		Try: Nakamura 7'; Con: Okuroda (0/1)	Referee: (South Africa) Ben Crouse

1 December 2017	Fiji	14–17	South Africa	The Sevens, Dubai
10:50	Try: Ravisa 2'; Naimasi 5'; Con: Tisolo (2/2) 3', 5'		Try: Roos 7'; Mpupha 9'; Grain 14'; Con: Stadler (1/1) 14'; Pienaar (0/2)	Referee: (Spain) Alhambra Nievas

11th Place

1 December 2017	Japan	15–17	Fiji	The Sevens, Dubai
14:40	Try: Nakamura 3'; Okuroda 10', 14'; Con: Okuroda (0/3)		Try: Naimasi 6'; Roqica 7'; Ravisa 13'; Con: Riwai (1/1) 13'; Cavuru (0/2)	Referee: (Republic of Ireland) Joy Neville

Challenge Trophy Final

1 December 2017	Ireland	24–7	South Africa	The Sevens, Dubai
16:25	Try: Flood 4'; Murphy-Crowe 7', 12'; Nic A Bhaird 14'; Con: Mulhall (2/4) 12', 14'		Try: Roos 5'; Con: Roos (1/1) 6'	Referee: (Wales) Adam Jones

=== 5th place ===
Semi-finals
1 December 2017 – 12:14 – The Sevens, Dubai
New Zealand	43
Spain	0
1 December 2017 – 12:36 – The Sevens, Dubai
England	12
France	21

5th Place Final
1 December 2017 – 15:24 – The Sevens, Dubai
New Zealand	24
France	0
7th Place
1 December 2017 – 15:02 – The Sevens, Dubai
Spain	21
England	14

Matches

Semi-finals

1 December 2017	New Zealand	43–0	Spain	The Sevens, Dubai
12:14	Try: Tui 2'; Williams 4'; Blyde 6', 7', 14'; McAlister 9'; Broughton 11'; Con: Nathan-Wong (2/4) 6', 7'; Whata (2/3) 12', 14'			Referee: (Italy) Beatrice Benvenuti

1 December 2017	England	12–21	France	The Sevens, Dubai
12:36	Try: Matthews 1'; Thompson 3'; Con: Jones (1/1) 2'; Aitchison (0/1); Cards: Matthews (yellow card) 5' to 7'		Try: Horta 7', 11'; Grassineau 14'; Con: Amedee (2/2) 7', 12'; Biscarat 14'	Referee: (South Africa) Aimee Barrett-Theron

7th Place

1 December 2017	Spain	21–14	England	The Sevens, Dubai
15:02	Try: Pla 3', 9', 12'; Con: Garcia (3/3) 4', 9', 12'		Try: Fleming 1', 14'; Con: Scott (2/2) 2', 14'; Cards: Jones (yellow card) 7' to 9'	Referee: (Italy) Beatrice Benvenuti

5th Place Final

1 December 2017	New Zealand	24–0	France	The Sevens, Dubai
15:24	Try: Woodman 3', 9', 14'; Blyde 12'; Con: Nathan-Wong (2/4) 3', 9'			Referee: (South Africa) Aimee Barrett-Theron

=== Cup ===
Quarter-finals
1 December 2017 – 09:00 – The Sevens, Dubai
New Zealand	12
United States	14
1 December 2017 – 09:22 – The Sevens, Dubai
Russia	20
Spain	7
1 December 2017 – 09:44 – The Sevens, Dubai
Australia	29
England	12
1 December 2017 – 10:06 – The Sevens, Dubai
Canada	24 (a.e.t.)
France	19

Semi-finals
1 December 2017 – 13:28 – The Sevens, Dubai
United States	21
Russia	12
1 December 2017 – 13:50 – The Sevens, Dubai
Australia	25
Canada	7

Cup Final
1 December 2017 – 17:15 – The Sevens, Dubai
United States	0
Australia	34
Bronze Medal Match
1 December 2017 – 16:50 – The Sevens, Dubai
Russia	10
Canada	5

Matches

Quarter-finals

1 December 2017	New Zealand	12–14	United States	The Sevens, Dubai
09:00	Try: Broughton 6'; Woodman 9'; Con: Nathan-Wong (1/2) 7'		Try: Tapper 4'; Stockert 14'; Con: Kelter (2/2) 4', 14'	Referee: (England) Sara Cox

1 December 2017	Russia	20–7	Spain	The Sevens, Dubai
09:22	Try: Khamidova 3', 6'; Mikhaltsova 9', 11'; Con: Kukina (0/4)		Try: Echebarria 7'; Con: Garcia (1/1) 7'	Referee: (Wales) Adam Jones

1 December 2017	Australia	29–12	England	The Sevens, Dubai
09:44	Try: Tonegato 2'; Sykes 6'; Pelite 7'; Du Toit 13'; Murphy 14'; Con: Sykes (2/5) 7', 13'		Try: Wilson-Hardy 4'; Thompson 14'; Con: Aitchison (0/1); Scott (1/1) 14'	Referee: (Scotland) Hollie Davidson

1 December 2017	Canada	24–19 (a.e.t.)	France	The Sevens, Dubai
10:06	Try: Greenshields 6', 14'; Benn 9'; Nicholas 16'; Con: Landry (2/3) 7', 9'		Try: Horta 3'; Grassineau 4', 11'; Con: Izar (1/2) 5'; Amedee 12'	Referee: (Republic of Ireland) Joy Neville

Semi-finals

1 December 2017	United States	21–12	Russia	The Sevens, Dubai
13:28	Try: Kelter 4', 6'; Heavirland 14'; Con: Kelter (2/2) 5', 14'; Heavirland (1/1) 6'		Try: Zdrokova 8'; Khamidova 10'; Con: Mikhaltsova (1/1) 9'; Kukina (0/1)	Referee: (Spain) Alhambra Nievas

1 December 2017	Australia	25–7	Canada	The Sevens, Dubai
13:50	Try: Tonegato 2'; Caslick 4'; Pelite 7', 11'; Cherry 13'; Con: Sykes (0/5)		Try: Landry 9'; Con: Landry (1/1) 9'	Referee: (South Africa) Ben Crouse

Bronze Medal Match

1 December 2017	Russia	10–5	Canada	The Sevens, Dubai
16:50	Try: Khamidova 3'; Zdrokova 14'; Con: Kukina (0/1); Lushina (0/1)		Try: Kish 7'; Con: Landry (0/1); Cards: Benn (yellow card) 12' to 14'	Referee: (Scotland) Hollie Davidson

Cup Final

1 December 2017	United States	0–34	Australia	The Sevens, Dubai
17:15			Try: Tonegato 3'; Williams 5'; Pelite 7'; Cherry 8'; Du Toit 12', 14'; Con: Sykes (2/6) 7' 14'	Referee: (England) Sara Cox

== Tournament placings ==
Place	Team	Points
1st place, gold medalist(s)	Australia	20
2nd place, silver medalist(s)	United States	18
3rd place, bronze medalist(s)	Russia	16
4	Canada	14
5	New Zealand	12
6	France	10

Place	Team	Points
7	Spain	8
8	England	6
9	Ireland	4
10	South Africa	3
11	Fiji	2
12	Japan	1

Source: World Rugby

== Players ==
=== Scoring leaders ===
Tries scored
Rank	Player	Tries
1	(New Zealand) Portia Woodman	9
2	(Russia) Elena Zdrokova	7
	(Australia) Emma Tonegato	7
	(Canada) Julia Greenshields	7
	(New Zealand) Michaela Blyde	7

Points scored
Rank	Player	Points
1	(New Zealand) Portia Woodman	45
2	(Russia) Elena Zdrokova	35
	(Australia) Emma Tonegato	35
	(Canada) Julia Greenshields	35
	(New Zealand) Michaela Blyde	35

Source: World Rugby

=== Dream Team ===
The following seven players were selected to the tournament Dream Team at the conclusion of the tournament:

Forwards	Backs
(New Zealand) Portia Woodman (Russia) Baizat Khamidova (Australia) Evania Pelite	(Canada) Julia Greenshields (United States) Leyla Kelter (Australia) Emma Tonegato (Russia) Elena Zdrokova

== See also ==
- 2017 Dubai Sevens (for men)
