= Aimee Barrett-Theron =

South African rugby union player and referee

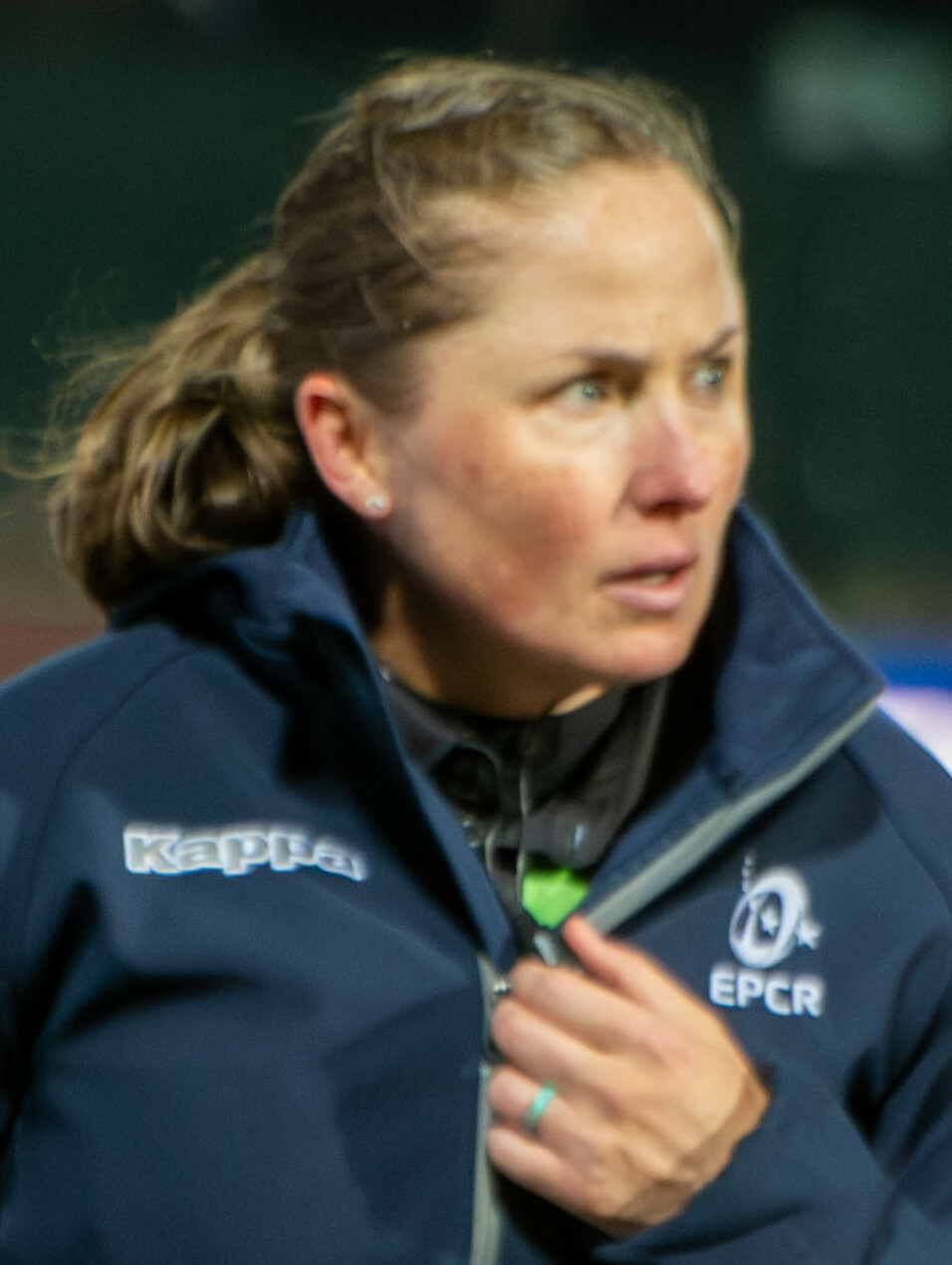
- Born: Aimee Patricia Barrett; 27 June 1987 (age 39) Cape Town, South Africa
- Height: 1.71 m (5 ft 7 1/2 in)
- Weight: 71 kg (11 st 3 lb; 157 lb)
- School: Northlands Girls' High School, Durban

Rugby union career
- Position: Fullback / Centre / Fly-half
Amateur team(s)
Years	Team	Apps	(Points)
2005–2008	KwaZulu-Natal Women Sevens		
2006–2008	KwaZulu-Natal Women		
2009–2012	Western Province Women Sevens		
- Correct as of 7 December 2016
International career
Years	Team	Apps	(Points)
2007	South Africa Women Touch Rugby		
2007–2012	South Africa Women Sevens		
2008	South Africa Women Under-20		
2008–2012	South Africa Women		
- Correct as of 7 December 2016

Aimee Patricia Barrett-Theron (née Barrett, born 27 June 1987) is a South African rugby union former player, and currently a referee on South Africa's Premier Panel.

== Playing career ==
She could play as a fullback, centre or fly-half and played in various forms of the game – 15-a-side rugby union, rugby sevens and touch rugby. Aside from rugby union, she works as a biokineticist.

She represented KwaZulu-Natal at domestic level between 2005 and 2008, and Western Province between 2009 and 2012. She also represented South Africa Women at Under-20 level in 2008, at senior level between 2008 and 2010 and for the sevens team between 2008 and 2012. Her records includes appearing at the 2010 Women's Rugby World Cup in England.

== Refereeing ==
She also took up refereeing, joining the World Rugby Women's Sevens Series circuit and being included on the refereeing panel for the 2016 Olympic Games. In December 2016, shortly before making her refereeing test debut for a 2017 World Cup qualifier between Japan and Fiji in Hong Kong, she was included on the South African Rugby Referees' Association's National B panel, becoming the first female referee in history to do so.

The South African became the first female referee to reach forty tests, when she took charge of England vs New Zealand on 14 September 2024.

== Personal life ==
She graduated at the Stellenbosch University. In her 30s, she was diagnosed with autism.

On July 15, 2026, she announced she was diagnosed with breast cancer, and had temporarily stood down from officiating.
