= Alhambra Nievas =

Spain international rugby union player & referee

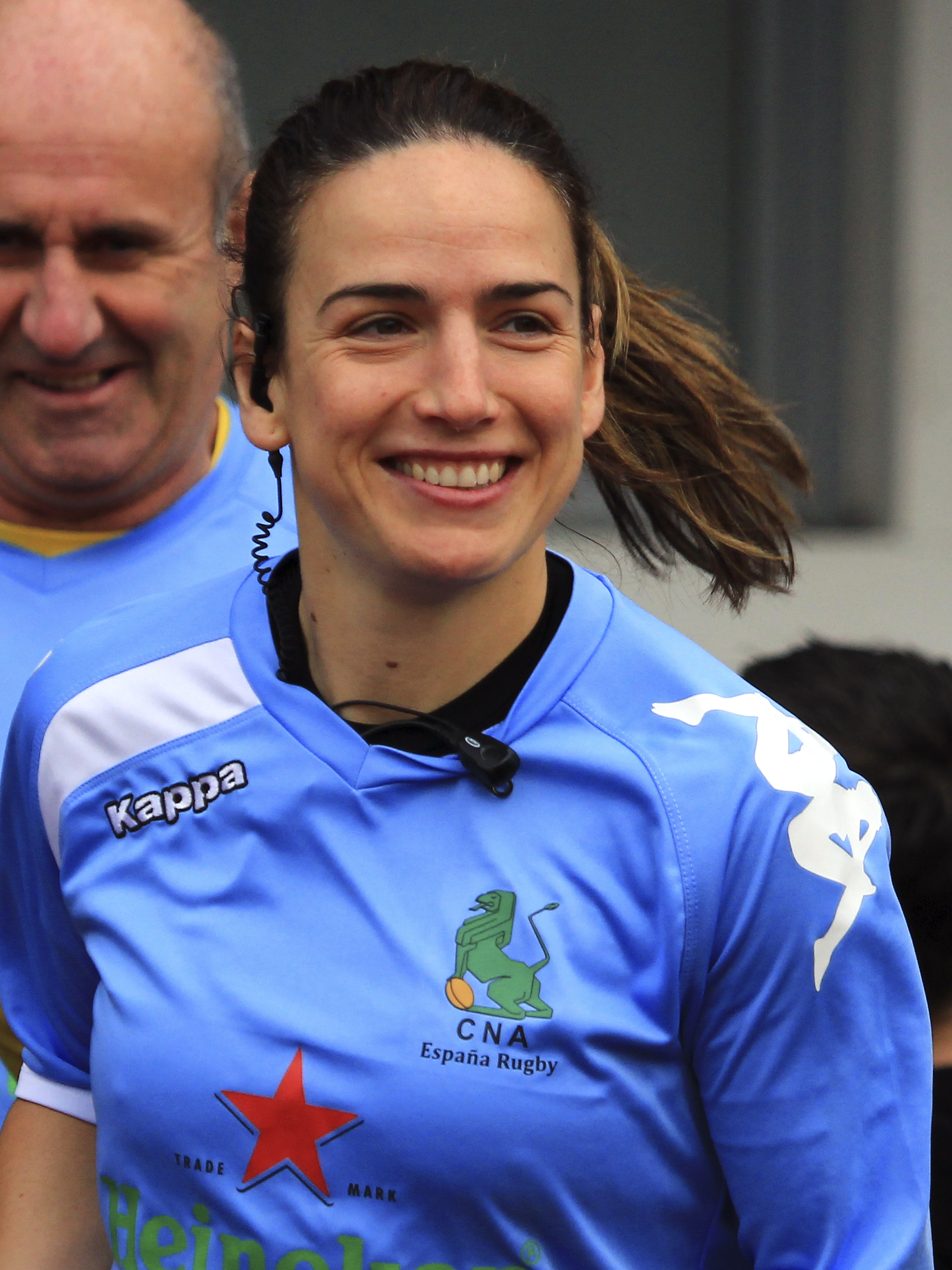
- Nievas in 2016
- Born: Alhambra Nievas González; 9 August 1983 (age 43) Beas de Granada, Spain
- University: University of Málaga

Rugby union career
- Position: Back row
Senior career
Years	Team	Apps	(Points)
2002–12	CDU Málaga		
Provincial / State sides
Years	Team	Apps	(Points)
2004–12	Andalucía		
International career
Years	Team	Apps	(Points)
2006	Spain	3	
National sevens team
Years	Team		Comps
200x–	Spain Sevens		
Refereeing career
Years	Competition		Apps
2012–	División de Honor de Rugby		
2012–	Copa del Rey de Rugby		
2014–	World Rugby Women's Sevens Series		
2014–	Women's Rugby World Cup		
2015–	Women's Six Nations Championship		
2016–	Women's Rugby sevens at the Olympics		
2017–	Rugby Europe Conference		

Alhambra Nievas González (born 9 August 1983) is a former Spain women's rugby union international and a current rugby union referee. Nievas refereed the women's final at the 2016 Summer Olympics. In 2016 she also served as an assistant referee at a men's international between Tonga and the United States. This saw her become the first woman to officiate in a men's rugby union international. In 2017 Nievas refereed a Rugby Europe Conference match between Finland and Norway. This saw her become the first woman to referee a men's rugby union international in Europe. In 2016 Nievas, along with Rasta Rasivhenge, was jointly named World Rugby Referee of the Year. She is the first woman to win the award. She was previously nominated for the award in 2015.

== Early life ==
Nievas was born in Beas de Granada and was named after the Alhambra. As a child she spent time in Almería, where she played and tried out various sports including association football, tennis, basketball, volleyball, and karate.

== Playing career ==
=== Club and province ===
Nievas first began playing women's rugby union in 2002, aged 19, while attending the University of Málaga, where she was studying for a degree in telecommunications engineering. She subsequently played for the university's women's team for ten years and also served as club captain. She remains actively involved with the team, serving as a coordinator and trainer. In addition to playing for CDU Málaga, Nievas represented Andalucía at provincial level.

=== Spain international ===
During the 2006 Women's Six Nations Championship, Nievas made three appearances for Spain. She made her debut on 11 February in a 3–86 defeat against England. She also played against France on 25 February and against Scotland on 18 March. Nievas also played for the Spain women's national rugby sevens team.

== Refereeing career ==
=== Early years ===
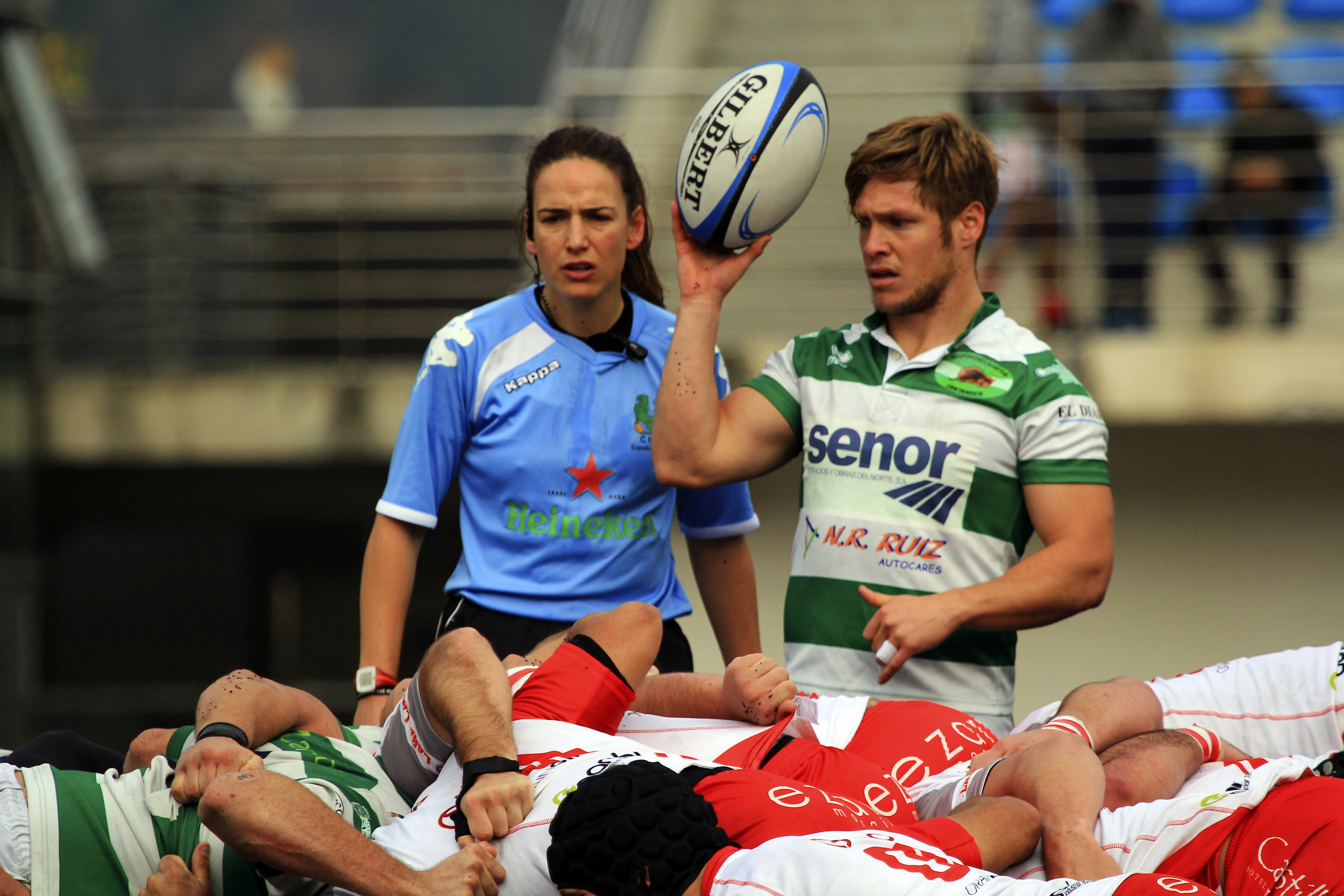
Nievas refereeing a match in the División de Honor de Rugby

Nievas first began refereeing in 2006, aged 26. While still an active player, she agreed to help out at a children's tournament. Then on weekends, when she did not have a match, she began regularly refereeing youth matches. Her talents were recognised by both the Federación Andaluza de Rugby and the Spanish Rugby Federation. In 2012, after being offered the chance to take charge of matches in senior men's competitions, Nievas chose to retire as a player and concentrate on refereeing. In 2012–13 she began refereeing in the División de Honor de Rugby and in 2014–15 she refereed the championship final. In 2014, after Paloma Loza and Itziar Díaz, she became the third woman to referee a Copa del Rey de Rugby final. She also refereed the 2017 final.

=== Women's international competitions ===
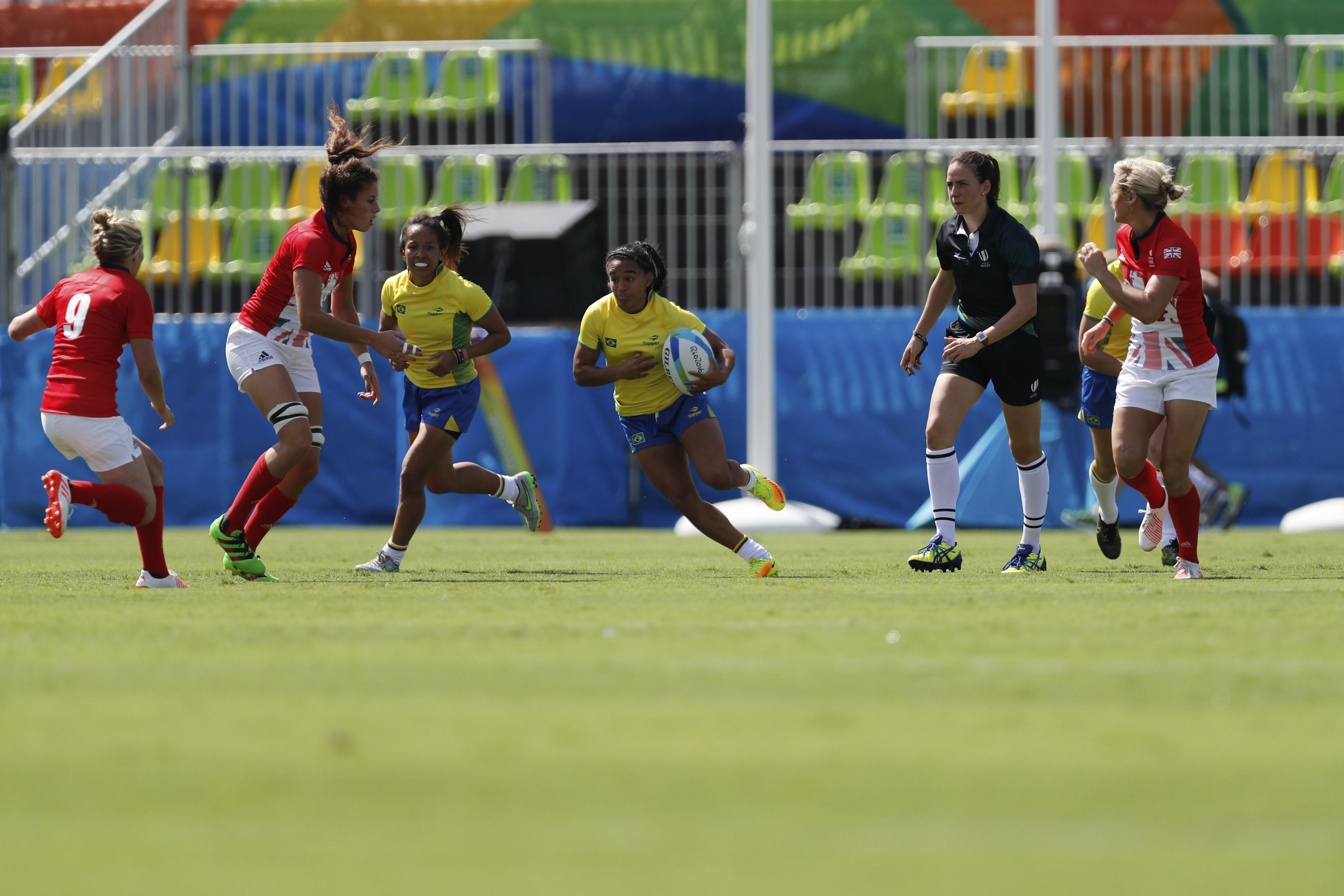
6 August 2016: Nievas refereeing a match between Brazil and Great Britain at the 2016 Summer Olympics

On 15 February 2014, at the USA Women's Sevens, Nievas took charge of a match between Australia and China. This was her first match in charge on the World Rugby Women's Sevens Series circuit. On 30 November 2017 at the Dubai Women's Sevens she took charge of a match between Russia and England. This was her 100th World Rugby Women's Sevens Series match. In 2014 Nievas made her international debut as a referee in the women's fifteen-a-side game when she took charge of a game between New Zealand and Samoa at Eden Park. She subsequently refereed games in the Women's Six Nations Championship and at both the 2014 and 2017 Women's Rugby World Cups. She also refereed the women's final at the 2016 Summer Olympics.

=== Men's international competitions ===
Nievas served as referee at both the 2015 Africa Cup Sevens and the 2016 Men's Rugby Sevens Final Olympic Qualification Tournament. On 19 November 2016 Nievas served as an assistant referee at an international between Tonga and the United States at Anoeta Stadium. This made her the first woman to officiate in a men's rugby union international. On 14 October 2017 Nievas refereed a Rugby Europe Conference match between Finland and Norway, becoming the first woman to referee a men's rugby union international in Europe. Ireland's Joy Neville became the second two weeks later.

== Honours ==
Individual

- World Rugby Referee of the Year
  - 2016
