= Baizat Khamidova =

Russian rugby sevens player

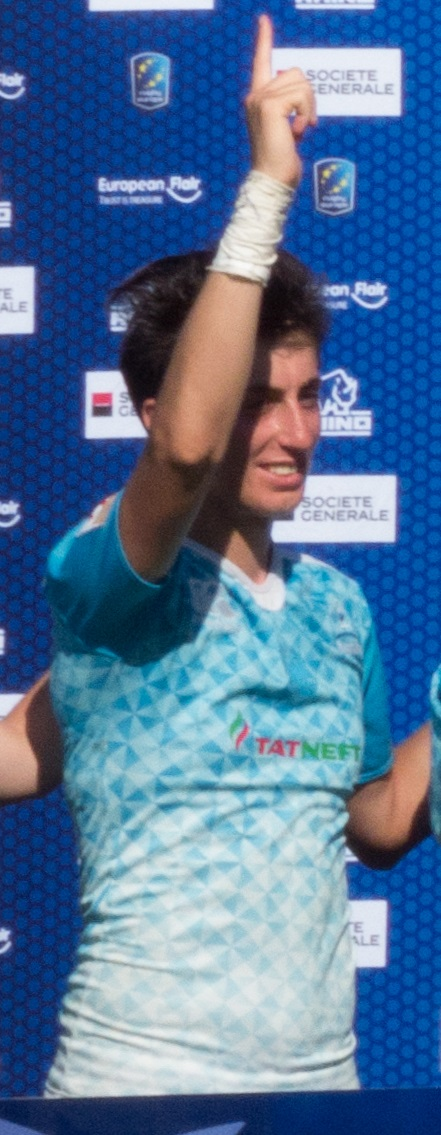
- Full name: Baizat Khamidovna Khamidova
- Born: 31 August 1990 (age 36) Ibragimotar, Babayurtovsky District, Republic of Dagestan, Russia
- Height: 1.85 m (6 ft 1 in)
- Weight: 75 kg (165 lb)

Rugby union career
National sevens team
Years	Team	Comps
2013–2022	Russia	203 (600 pts)

Baizat Khamidovna Khamidova (Russian: Байзат Хамидовна Хамидова; born 31 August 1990) is a Russian rugby sevens player. She competed in the women's tournament at the 2020 Summer Olympics.
