= 2018–19 World Rugby Women's Sevens Series squads =

World Rugby Women's Sevens 2018–19 squads Series VII
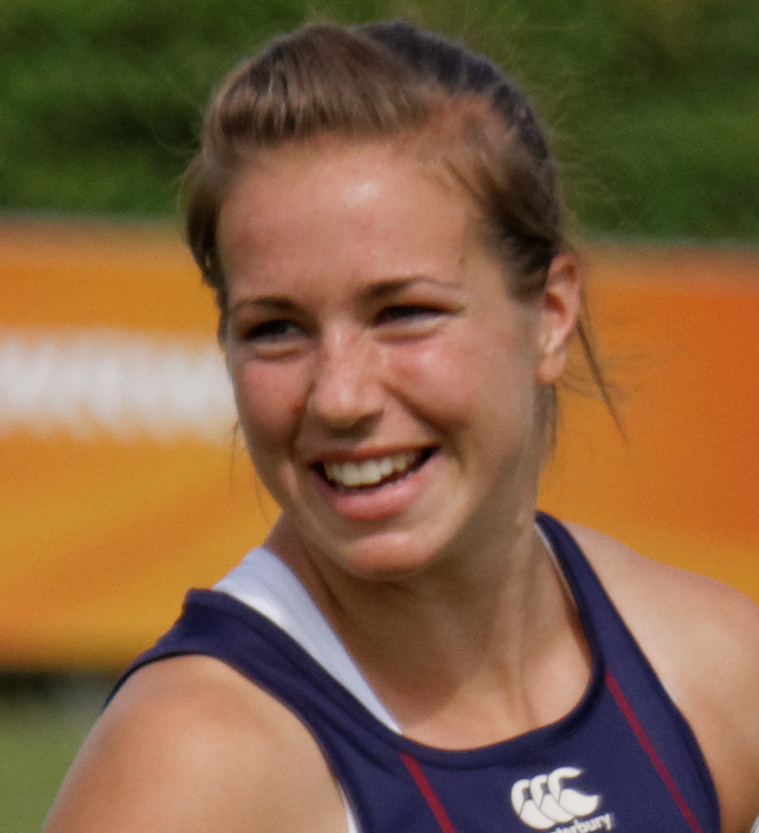
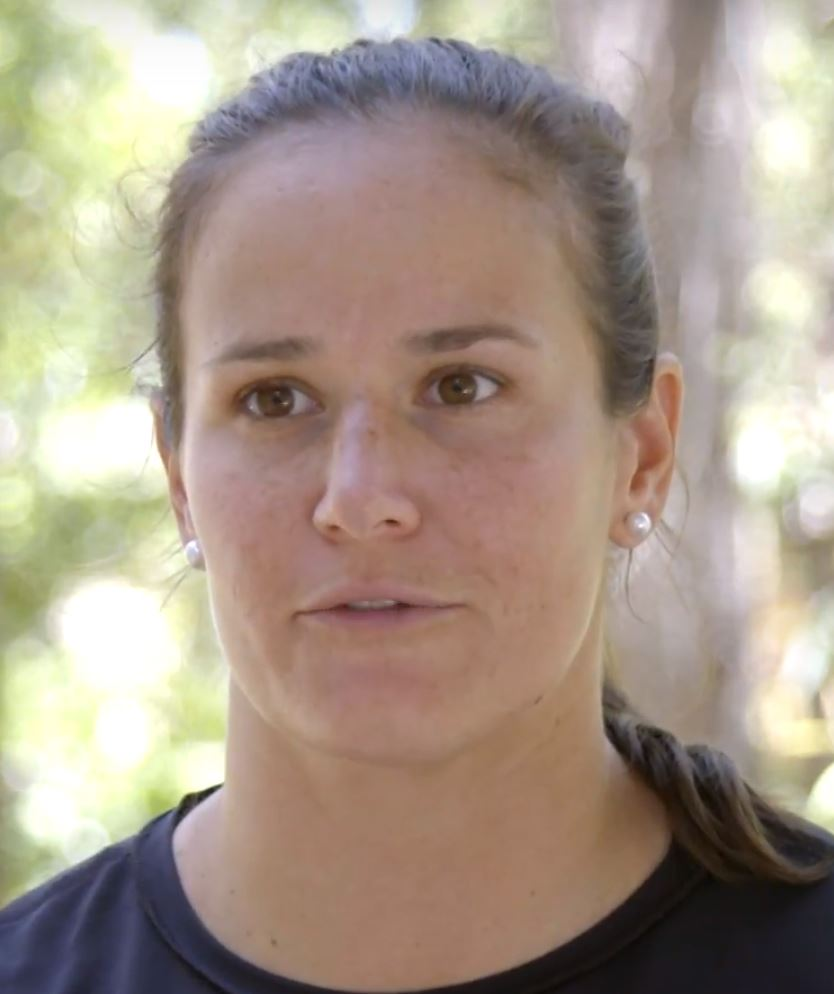
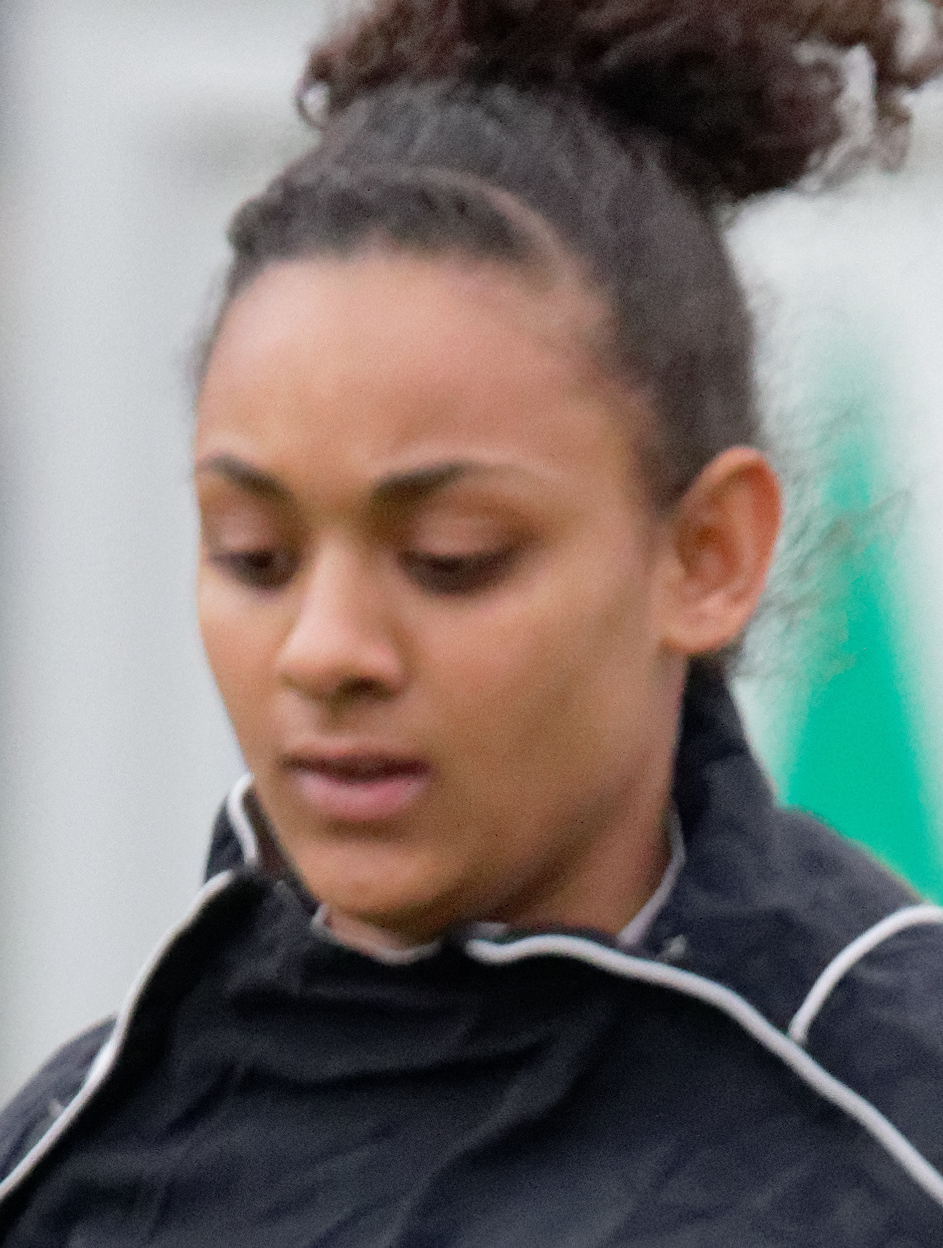
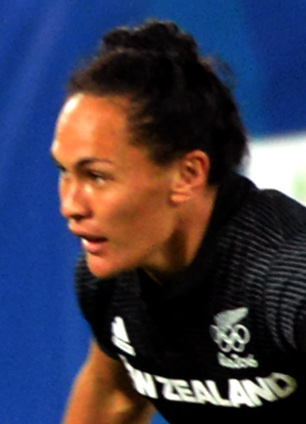
- Players in Series VII. Clockwise from top left: Emily Scarratt of England, Shannon Parry of Australia, Portia Woodman of New Zealand and Anne-Cécile Ciofani of France.

This is a list of the complete squads for the 2018–19 World Rugby Women's Sevens Series.

Captains for a tournament have their jersey number marked in bold.

== Australia ==
Coach: John Manenti

Australia team members 2018–19
Player	Apps	Position	Jersey number by tournament					
Player	Apps	Position	Glendale	Dubai	Sydney	Kitakyushu	Langford	Biarritz
Lauren Brown	1	Back	–	–	–	–	–	9
Rhiannon Byers	1	Forward	–	–	–	–	–	11
Charlotte Caslick	5	Back	7	7	–	**7**	**7**	**7**
Lily Dick	5	Forward	–	8	8	8	8	8
Dominique Du Toit	3	Back	4	4	4	–	–	–
Ellia Green	6	Back	12	12	12	12	12	12
Demi Hayes	1	Forward	3	–	–	–	–	–
Page McGregor	3	Back	10	11	11	–	–	–
Yasmin Meakes	5	Forward	8	5	7	4	4	–
Mahalia Murphy	2		–	–	–	11	11	–
Sariah Paki	5	Forward	–	3	3	3	3	3
Shannon Parry	2	Forward	**1**	–	–	–	–	1
Evania Pelite	6	Back	6	6	6	6	6	6
Alicia Quirk	5	Back	–	10	10	10	10	10
Cassie Staples	1	Forward	11	–	–	–	–	–
Emma Sykes	5	Back	9	9	9	9	9	–
Emma Tonegato	4	Back	–	–	5	5	5	5
Samantha Treherne	6	Back	5	1	1	1	1	4
Sharni Williams	6	Forward	**2**	**2**	**2**	**2**	**2**	**2**

== Canada ==
Coach: John Tait

Canada team members 2018–19
Player	Apps	Position	Jersey number by tournament					
Player	Apps	Position	Glendale	Dubai	Sydney	Kitakyushu	Langford	Biarritz
Olivia Apps	2	Back	–	11	12	–	–	–
Brittany Benn	5	Back	1	1	1	1	1	1
Pam Buisa	2	Forward	12	12	–	–	–	–
Emma Chown	5	Back	11	–	11	11	11	11
Caroline Crossley	6	Forward	3	3	3	3	3	3
Bianca Farella	6	Forward	8	8	8	8	8	8
Julia Greenshields	6	Back	5	5	5	5	5	5
Sara Kaljuvee	3	Forward	7	7	7	–	–	–
Ghislaine Landry	6	Back	**9**	**9**	**9**	**9**	**9**	**9**
Kaili Lukan	6	Forward	10	10	10	10	10	10
Kayla Moleschi	6	Back	2	2	2	2	2	2
Breanne Nicholas	6	Back	4	4	4	4	4	4
Karen Paquin	3	Forward	–	–	–	7	7	7
Keyara Wardley	3	Forward	–	–	–	12	12	12
Charity Williams	6	Back	6	6	6	6	6	6

== China ==
Coach: Chad Shepherd

China team members 2018–19
Player	Apps	Position	Jersey number by tournament					
Player	Apps	Position	Glendale	Dubai	Sydney	Kitakyushu	Langford	Biarritz
Chen Keyi	6		10	10	7	7	7	7
Chen Ming	2		–	7	4	–	–	–
Gao Yueying	5		11	–	11	11	11	11
Ge Chenjie	1		–	12	–	–	–	–
Gu Yaoyao	4		–	11	6	6	6	–
Hu Yu	5		4	4	–	4	10	4
Ling Chen	1		–	–	–	–	–	6
Liu Xiaoqian	4		8	8	8	8	–	
Lyu Hewen	2		–	–	–	–	4	10
Ma Xiaodan	1		–	3	–	–	–	–
Peng Xin	2		–	–	–	–	1	1
Ruan Hongting	5		9	9	12	12	12	–
Shen Yingying	2		2	2	–	–	–	–
Su Qi	1		12	–	–	–	–	–
Sun Caihong	1		–	–	–	10	–	–
Wang Wanyu	1		6	–	–	–	–	–
Wang Xiao	2		–	–	1	1	–	–
Wang Yueyue	3		–	6	10	–	8	–
Wu Xianhong	1		–	–	–	–	–	12
Yan Meiling	6		**5**	**5**	**5**	**5**	**5**	**5**
Yang Danxu	1		–	–	–	–	–	8
Yang Feifei	1		7	–	–	–	–	–
Yang Min	5		1	–	2	2	2	2
Yang Xu	4		–	–	9	9	9	9
Yu Liping	5		3	–	3	3	3	3
Zhang Huihui	1		–	1	–	–	–	–

== England ==
Coach: James Bailey

England team members 2018–19
Player	Apps	Position	Jersey number by tournament					
Player	Apps	Position	Glendale	Dubai	Sydney	Kitakyushu	Langford	Biarritz
Lizzie Adam	3		–	–	4	4	–	4
Holly Aitchison	5	Back	11	11	11	11	11	–
Claire Allan	3	Back	1	–	1	–	–	**1**
Jess Breach	2	Back	12	1	–	–	–	–
Abbie Brown	5	Back	**2**	**2**	**2**	**2**	**2**	–
Abi Burton	6		9	3	3	3	3	3
Heather Fisher	2	Forward	–	–	–	–	4	7
Deborah Fleming	5	Forward	6	6	6	–	6	6
Sydney Gregson	1		–	–	–	–	–	2
Emma Hardy	2		–	–	–	6	–	5
Natasha Hunt	2	Back	5	5	–	–	–	–
Megan Jones	5	Back	–	10	10	10	10	10
Ellie Kildunne	5		8	8	–	1	1	11
Katie Mason	1		–	–	–	–	–	12
Alex Matthews	4	Forward	–	9	9	9	9	–
Celia Quansah	5		3	–	8	8	8	8
Helena Rowland	5		10	10	5	5	5	–
Emily Scarratt	2	Back	4	4	–	–	–	–
Emma Uren	5		7	7	7	7	7	–
Beth Wilcock	1		–	–	–	–	–	9
Amy Wilson-Hardy	4	Forward	–	12	12	12	12	–

== Fiji ==
Coach: Alifereti Dovivereta

Fiji team members 2018–19
Player	Apps	Position	Jersey number by tournament					
Player	Apps	Position	Glendale	Dubai	Sydney	Kitakyushu	Langford	Biarritz
Ema Adivitaloga	1		–	6	–	–	–	–
Naina Baleca	2		11	4	–	–	–	–
Esiteri Bulikiobo	1		2	–	–	–	–	–
Merewai Cumu	1	Forward	–	–	5	–	–	–
Raijieli Daveua	4		–	–	2	3	3	3
Paulini Korowaqa	3		–	10	–	5	5	–
Litiana Lawedrau	2		9	9	–	–	–	–
Sereima Leweniqila	1		**1**	–	–	–	–	–
Rusila Nagasau	3	Back	–	–	**7**	**7**	**7**	**7**
Sereana Nagatalevu	2		6	–	–	–	1	–
Ana Maria Naimasi	6	Back	7	7	11	11	11	11
Litia Naiqato	2	Forward	3	1	–	–	–	–
Roela Radinyavuni	2		12	12	–	–	–	–
Akosita Ravato	1		4	–	–	–	–	–
Viniana Riwai	1		–	–	–	–	–	1
Merewalesi Rokouono	5		10	11	6	6	6	–
Ana Maria Roqica	3	Back	–	–	8	8	–	8
Joma Rubiti	1		–	5	–	–	–	–
Asinate Savu	5		–	2	3	2	2	2
Tokasa Seniyasi	4		–	–	12	12	9	12
Akanisi Sokoiwasa	4		–	–	9	9	12	9
Vasiti Solikoviti	6		5	3	4	4	4	4
Lavenia Tinai	4	Back	–	–	1	1	8	6
Luisa Tisolo	4	Back	–	–	10	10	10	10
Mereula Torooti	3	Back	8	8	–	–	–	5

== France ==
Coach: David Courteix

France team members 2018–19
Player	Apps	Position	Jersey number by tournament					
Player	Apps	Position	Glendale	Dubai	Sydney	Kitakyushu	Langford	Biarritz
Montserrat Amédée	1	Back	**5**	–	–	–	–	–
Julie Annery	2	Forward	8	–	–	–	–	4
Coralie Bertrand	4		–	7	–	8	4	12
Pauline Biscarat	2	Back	4	4	–	–	–	–
Anne-Cécile Ciofani	6	Forward	2	12	2	2	2	2
Mathilde Coutouly	1		–	–	–	4	–	–
Celia Dranes	1		–	–	8	–	–	–
Caroline Drouin	6	Back	10	10	10	9	10	10
Camille Grassineau	3		–	8	–	–	8	8
Joanna Grisez	2		–	–	12	12	–	–
Lina Guérin	1	Back	12	–	–	–	–	–
Shannon Izar	6	Forward	11	11	11	**11**	11	11
Fanny Horta	6	Back	6	**6**	**6**	**6**	**6**	**6**
Nassira Konde	3		–	5	–	5	12	–
Jade Le Pesq	2	Back	–	–	–	–	5	5
Valentine Lothoz	1		–	–	5	–	–	–
Marjorie Mayans	6	Forward	1	1	1	1	1	1
Carla Neisen	6	Back	9	9	9	10	9	9
Séraphine Okemba	5		–	2	7	7	7	7
Chloé Pelle	6	Forward	3	3	3	3	3	3
Charlotte Torres Duxans	1		–	–	4	–	–	–
Jessy Trémoulière	1	Back	7	–	–	–	–	–

== Ireland ==
Coach: Anthony Eddy

Ireland team members 2018–19
Player	Apps	Position	Jersey number by tournament					
Player	Apps	Position	Glendale	Dubai	Sydney	Kitakyushu	Langford	Biarritz
Kathy Baker	1		–	–	–	–	–	7
Ashleigh Baxter	2	Forward	6	6	–	–	–	–
Claire Boles	4	Forward	4	–	–	1	1	1
Megan Burns	3		–	–	–	6	9	9
Aoife Doyle	6	Back	8	8	8	8	8	8
Katie Fitzhenry	1	Forward	7	–	–	–	–	–
Stacey Flood	3	Back	3	3	–	–	–	3
Louise Galvin	5		–	11	11	11	11	11
Katie Heffernan	2	Back	12	–	–	–	12	–
Eve Higgins	6	Back	10	10	10	10	10	10
Brittany Hogan	5		–	4	4	4	4	4
Emily Lane	4		–	–	3	3	3	12
Anna McGann	4		–	7	7	7	7	–
Lucy Mulhall	4	Back	**9**	**9**	**9**	**9**	–	–
Amee-Leigh Murphy-Crowe	6	Back	5	5	5	5	**5**	**5**
Deirbhile Nic a Bhaird	6	Forward	11	12	12	12	6	6
Audrey O'Flynn	3	Forward	1	1	1	–	–	–
Beibhinn Parsons	1		–	–	6	–	–	–
Hannah Tyrrell	6	Back	2	2	2	2	2	2

== New Zealand ==
Coach:

- Allan Bunting (to Kitakyushu)
- Cory Sweeney (Langford onwards)

New Zealand team members 2018–19
Player	Apps	Position	Jersey number by tournament					
Player	Apps	Position	Glendale	Dubai	Sydney	Kitakyushu	Langford	Biarritz
Shakira Baker	6	Forward	2	2	2	2	2	2
Michaela Blyde	5	Back	6	6	6	–	6	6
Kelly Brazier	4	Back	8	8	–	–	8	8
Gayle Broughton	2		–	9	9	–	–	–
Dhys Faleafaga	3		–	–	–	8	11	11
Rhiarna Ferris	1		–	–	–	10	–	–
Theresa Fitzpatrick	4	Forward	10	10	10	–	–	10
Sarah Hirini	6	Back	**5**	**5**	**5**	**5**	**5**	**5**
Tyla Nathan-Wong	6	Back	7	7	7	7	7	7
Risi Pouri-Lane	2		–	11	–	–	9	–
Cheyelle Robins-Reti	3		–	–	–	6	10	9
Alena Saili	6	Forward	12	12	12	12	12	12
Terina Te Tamaki	6	Back	3	4	11	11	3	3
Ruby Tui	6	Back	1	1	1	1	1	1
Stacey Waaka	3		–	3	3	3	–	–
Kat Whata-Simpkins	2	Forward	9	–	8	–	–	–
Niall Williams	5	Back	4	–	4	4	4	4
Tenika Willison	1		–	–	–	9	–	–
Portia Woodman	1	Forward	11	–	–	–	–	–

== Russia ==
Coach: Andrey Kuzin

Russia team members 2018–19
Player	Apps	Position	Jersey number by tournament					
Player	Apps	Position	Glendale	Dubai	Sydney	Kitakyushu	Langford	Biarritz
Alina Arterchuk	1		–	–	–	–	–	8
Anna Baranchuk	6	Forward	12	12	12	12	12	12
Arina Bystrova	2	Forward	11	–	11	–	–	–
Iana Danilova	5		–	11	3	11	11	11
Anna Gavrilyuk	6	Forward	6	6	6	6	6	6
Diana Glushenko	2		–	–	9	–	9	–
Baizat Khamidova	6	Forward	5	5	5	5	5	5
Marina Kukina	5	Back	8	8	8	8	8	–
Snezhanna Kulkova	4	Back	9	9	–	9	–	9
Daria Lushina	6	Back	2	2	2	2	2	2
Alena Mikhaltsova	6	Back	**4**	**4**	**4**	**4**	**4**	**4**
Daria Noritsina	6	Back	1	1	1	1	1	1
Anastasia Prokudina	2	Back	10	3	–	–	–	–
Kristina Seredina	6	Forward	7	7	7	7	7	7
Daria Shestakova	4	Back	3	–	–	3	3	3
Elena Zdrokova	5		–	10	10	10	10	10

== Spain ==
Coach: Pedro de Matías

Spain team members 2018–19
Player	Apps	Position	Jersey number by tournament					
Player	Apps	Position	Glendale	Dubai	Sydney	Kitakyushu	Langford	Biarritz
Eva Aguirre	1		–	–	–	–	2	–
Ingrid Algar	5	Back	10	10	10	10	10	–
Uri Barrutieta	1		–	2	–	–	–	–
Marina Bravo	6	Forward	**5**	**5**	**5**	**5**	5	5
María Casado	4	Back	9	–	9	–	9	9
Beatriz Dominguez Sanchez	4		2	6	2	2	–	–
Iera Echebarría	4	Back	11	11	11	11	–	–
Amaia Erbina	5	Forward	3	3	3	3	–	3
Lide Erbina	5		12	12	12	12	–	12
Anne Fernández de Corres	2		–	–	–	–	**12**	10
Olivia Fresneda	5	Back	1	8	–	8	8	8
María García	3		4	9	8	–	11	–
Patricia García	5		–	4	4	4	4	4
Sabina Hurtado	2	Forward	8	–	–	–	–	2
Maria Losada	5		–	1	1	1	1	1
Elisabet Martínez	5	Forward	6	–	6	6	6	6
Bárbara Plà	6	Back	**7**	7	7	7	7	**7**
Paula Requena	3		–	–	–	9	3	11

== United States ==
Coach: Chris Brown

United States team members 2018–19
Player	Apps	Position	Jersey number by tournament					
Player	Apps	Position	Glendale	Dubai	Sydney	Kitakyushu	Langford	Biarritz
Meya Bizer	3		–	–	3	3	1	–
Ashley Byrge	1		–	12	–	–	–	–
Kayla Canett	3	Back	–	–	–	10	10	10
Lauren Doyle	6	Back	**6**	**6**	**6**	**6**	**6**	**6**
Cheta Emba	5	Forward	1	1	1	1	–	1
Joanne Fa'avesi	4	Forward	–	9	9	9	9	–
Jordan Gray	4	Forward	8	–	8	8	8	–
Abby Gustaitis	4	Forward	3	3	–	–	3	3
Nicole Heavirland	6	Back	**4**	**4**	**4**	**4**	**4**	**4**
Alev Kelter	5	Back	5	5	–	5	5	5
Kristi Kirshe	4		–	–	12	12	12	12
Ilona Maher	6	Back	2	2	2	2	2	2
Kasey McCravey	2		–	–	5	–	–	8
Alena Olsen	3		9	8	10	–	–	–
Steph Rovetti	3		10	10	–	–	–	9
Naya Tapper	6	Back	7	7	7	7	7	7
Kristen Thomas	6	Back	11	11	11	11	11	11
Lauren Thunen	1		12	–	–	–	–	–

== Invitational teams ==
One place in each tournament of the series is allocated to a national team based on performance in the respective continental tournaments within Africa, Asia, Europe, Oceania, and the Americas.

=== Brazil ===
Coach: Reuben Samuel

Brazil team for Langford 2019
Number	Player	Position
1	Mariana Silva	
2	Luiza Campos	
3	Marcelle Souza	
4	Aline Bednarski	
5	Thalia Costa	
6	Milena Silva	
7	Aline Furtado	
8	Beatriz Muhlbauer	
9	Haline Scatrut	
10	Franciele Martins	
11	Bianca Silva	
**12**	Raquel Kochhann	

=== Japan ===
Coach: Hitoshi Inada

Japan team for Kitakyushu 2019
Number	Player	Position
**1**	Chiharu Nakamura	
2	Yume Okuroda	
3	Chisato Yokoo	
4	Rinka Matsuda	
5	Mele Yua Havili Kagawa	
6	Honoka Tsutsumi	
7	Yume Hirano	
8	Iroha Nagata	
9	Riho Kurogi	
10	Yuki Ito	
11	Yoko Suzuki	
12	Tomomi Kozasa	

=== Kenya ===
Coach: Kevin Wambua

Kenya team for Dubai 2018
Number	Player	Position
1	Christabel Lindo	
2	Sophia Ayieta	
3	Sheila Chajira	
4	Anne Gorety	
5	Stella Nelima	
6	Diana Awino	
7	Sarah Ndunde	
8	Sinaida Omondi	
9	Janet Okelo	
10	Grace Odhiambo Okulu	
11	Camilla Atieno	
**12**	Philadelphia Olando	

=== Mexico ===
Coach: Simon Pierre

Mexico team for Glendale 2018
Number	Player	Position
1	Michelle Farah	
2	Isabela González	
3	Brenda Weinel	
4	Daniela Rosales	
5	Karmin Macedo	
6	Zoe Tuyu	
7	Fernanda Carillo	
8	Adriana Mendoza	
9	Vanessa Rodriguez	
10	Maria Fernanda Tovar	
**11**	Karina Landeros	
12	Rosa Rivera	

=== Papua New Guinea ===
Coach: Paul Tietjens

Papua New Guinea team for Sydney 2019
Number	Player	Position
1	Debbie Kaore	
**2**	Kymlie Rapilla	
3	Geau Larry	
4	Fatima Rama	
5	Melanie Kawa	
6	Taiva Lavai	
7	Lynette Kwarula	
8	Helen Abau	
9	Cassandra Sampson	
10	Gemma Schnaubelt	
11	Anika Butler	
12	Yolanda Gittins	

=== Scotland ===
Coach: Scott Forrest

Scotland team for Biarritz 2019
Number	Player	Position
1	Lisa Thomson	
2	Abi Evans	
3	Megan Gaffney	
4	Annabel Sergeant	
5	Hannah Smith	
6	Chloe Rollie	
7	Rhona Lloyd	
**8**	Helen Nelson	
9	Jenny Maxwell	
10	Eilidh Sinclair	
11	Evie Tonkin	
12	Meryl Smith	

== See also ==
- 2018–19 World Rugby Sevens Series squads (for men)
