= 2019 Canada Women's Sevens =

- Women's Sevens Series VII
- Host nation: Canada
- Date: 11–12 May 2019

Cup
- Champion: New Zealand
- Runner-up: Australia
- Third: United States

Challenge Trophy
- Winner: Fiji

Tournament details
- Matches played: 34
- Tries scored: 198 (average 5.82 per match)
- Most points: Ghislaine Landry (42)
- Most tries: Amee-Leigh Murphy-Crowe (8); Ellia Green (8)

The 2019 Canada Women's Sevens was the fifth tournament within the 2018–19 World Rugby Women's Sevens Series and the fifth edition of the Canada Women's Sevens to be played in the series. It was held over the weekend of 11–12 May 2019 at Westhills Stadium in Langford, British Columbia.

== Format ==
The teams are drawn into three pools of four teams each. Each team plays every other team in their pool once. The top two teams from each pool advance to the Cup brackets while the top 2 third place teams also compete in the Cup/Plate. The other teams from each group play-off for the Challenge Trophy.

== Teams ==
Eleven core teams are participating in the tournament along with one invited team, Brazil:

- Australia
- Brazil
- Canada
- China
- England
- Fiji
- France
- Ireland
- New Zealand
- Russia
- Spain
- United States

== Pool stage ==
All times in Pacific Daylight Time (UTC−07:00)

=== Pool A ===
| Team | Pld | W | D | L | PF | PA | PD | Pts |
|---|---|---|---|---|---|---|---|---|
| Australia | 3 | 3 | 0 | 0 | 105 | 26 | +79 | 9 |
| Canada | 3 | 2 | 0 | 1 | 74 | 41 | +33 | 7 |
| Ireland | 3 | 1 | 0 | 2 | 42 | 62 | –20 | 5 |
| Brazil | 3 | 0 | 0 | 3 | 21 | 113 | –92 | 3 |

11 May 2019
11:06

| Australia | 33–5 | Ireland |
| Try: Quirk 3'c Dick 5'c Caslick 7'c Pelite 7'c Green 10'm Con: Treherne (4/4) 3', 6', 7', 8'; Sykes (0/1) | Report | Try: Tyrell 14'm Con: Tyrell (0/1) |

Westhills Stadium, Langford
Referee: Sara Cox (England)

11 May 2019
11:28

| Canada | 38–7 | Brazil |
| Try: Landry 1'm Moleschi 7'c Chown 8'c Williams (2) 9'c, 11'm Paquin 13'c Con: Landry (2/3) 7', 8'; Nicholas (2/3) 10', 14' | Report | Try: B. Silva 4'c Con: Kochhann (1/1) 4' |

Westhills Stadium, Langford
Referee: Beatrice Benvenuti (Italy)

11 May 2019
13:50

| Australia | 43–7 | Brazil |
| Try: Green (2) 1'c, 7'm Pelite 3'c Caslick 6'c Paki 8'm Sykes 9'c Meakes 11'm Con: Treherne (3/4) 2', 3', 6'; Sykes (1/3) 9' | Report | Try: B. Silva 0'c Con: Kochhann (1/1) 0' |

Westhills Stadium, Langford
Referee: Joy Neville (Ireland)

11 May 2019
14:12

| Canada | 22–5 | Ireland |
| Try: Benn 4'm Landry 8'm Paquin (2) 9'm, 13'c Con: Landry (1/4) 13' | Report | Try: Murphy-Crowe 2'm Con: Higgins (0/1) |

Westhills Stadium, Langford
Referee: Amy Perrett (Australia)

11 May 2019
16:34

| Ireland | 32–7 | Brazil |
| Try: Murphy-Crowe (2) 0'm, 2'm Nic a Bhaird 6'm McGann 11'm Higgins 13'm Tyrell 14'c Con: Higgins (1/5) 14'; Burns (0/1) | Report | Try: B. Silva 3'c Con: Kochhann (1/1) 4' |

Westhills Stadium, Langford
Referee: Emily Hsieh (United States)

11 May 2019
16:56

| Canada | 14–29 | Australia |
| Try: Greenshields 0'c Farella 9'c Con: Landry (2/2) 1', 9' | Report | Try: Caslick 4'c Pelite 7'c Green (2) 10'm, 14'm Tonegato 12'm Con: Treherne (2/2) 5', 7'; Sykes (0/3) |

Westhills Stadium, Langford
Referee: Hollie Davidson (Scotland)

=== Pool B ===
| Team | Pld | W | D | L | PF | PA | PD | Pts |
|---|---|---|---|---|---|---|---|---|
| New Zealand | 3 | 3 | 0 | 0 | 83 | 17 | +66 | 9 |
| England | 3 | 2 | 0 | 1 | 69 | 26 | +43 | 7 |
| Russia | 3 | 1 | 0 | 2 | 54 | 59 | –5 | 5 |
| China | 3 | 0 | 0 | 3 | 12 | 116 | –104 | 3 |

11 May 2019
10:22

| New Zealand | 26–7 | Russia |
| Try: Blyde (2) 0'c, 7'c Brazier 7'm Williams 13'c Con: Nathan-Wong (3/4) 1', 7', 14' | Report | Try: Zdrokova 12'c Con: Lushina (1/1) 12' |

Westhills Stadium, Langford
Referee: Emily Hsieh (United States)

11 May 2019
10:44

| England | 38–0 | China |
| Try: Quansah (2) 1'm, 4'c Aitchison 6'c Burton 8'c Rowland 9'c Uren 10'm Con: Aitchison (4/6) 4', 6', 8', 9' | Report |

Westhills Stadium, Langford
Referee: Tyler Miller (Australia)

11 May 2019
13:06

| New Zealand | 45–0 | China |
| Try: Williams 0'c Blyde 2'c Tui 7'c Faleafaga 8'c Brazier 10'm Robins-Reti 12'm Te Temaki 14'c Con: Nathan-Wong (4/5) 0', 3', 7', 8'; Pouri-Lane (1/2) 14' | Report |

Westhills Stadium, Langford
Referee: Tevita Rokovereni (Fiji)

11 May 2019
13:28

| England | 21–14 | Russia |
| Try: Rowland 5'c Brown 10'c Aitchison 13'c Con: Aitchison (3/3) 6', 11', 14' | Report | Try: Shestakova 7'c Zdrokova 7'c Con: Lushina (1/1) 7'; Kukina (1/1) 8' |

Westhills Stadium, Langford
Referee: Beatrice Benvenuti (Italy)

11 May 2019
15:50

| Russia | 33–12 | China |
| Try: Khamidova 1'c Gavrilyuk 3'c Glushenko 4'm Mikhaltsova (2) 8'c, 14'c Con: Lushina (4/5) 1', 3', 8', 14' | Report | Try: Liping 7'c Keyi 12'm Con: Keyi (1/2) 7' |

Westhills Stadium, Langford
Referee: Amy Perrett (Australia)

11 May 2019
16:12

| England | 10–12 | New Zealand |
| Try: Kildunne 3'm Aitchison 7'm Con: Aitchison (0/2) | Report | Try: Saili 5'm Hirini 10'c Con: Nathan-Wong (1/2) 10' |

Westhills Stadium, Langford
Referee: Joy Neville (Ireland)

=== Pool C ===
| Team | Pld | W | D | L | PF | PA | PD | Pts |
|---|---|---|---|---|---|---|---|---|
| United States | 3 | 3 | 0 | 0 | 61 | 19 | +42 | 9 |
| France | 3 | 2 | 0 | 1 | 38 | 43 | –5 | 7 |
| Spain | 3 | 1 | 0 | 2 | 50 | 54 | –4 | 5 |
| Fiji | 3 | 0 | 0 | 3 | 35 | 68 | –33 | 3 |

11 May 2019
11:50

| France | 19–14 | Fiji |
| Try: Izar 1'm Drouin 12'c Ciofani 13'c Con: Drouin (2/2) 12', 13'; Izar (0/1) | Report | Try: Seniyasi (2) 5', 7'; Con: Tisolo (2/2) 5', 7' |

Westhills Stadium, Langford
Referee: Hollie Davidson (Scotland)

11 May 2019
12:12

| United States | 21–12 | Spain |
| Try: Kirshe 10'c Heavirland 12'c Kelter 14'c Con: Heavirland (2/2) 10', 12'; Kelter (1/1) 14' | Report | Try: Casado 2'm Martínez 4'c Con: P. García (1/2) 5' |

Westhills Stadium, Langford
Referee: Amy Perrett (Australia)

11 May 2019
14:34

| France | 19–17 | Spain |
| Try: Bertrand 4'c Horta 7'c Konde 11'm Con: Drouin (2/2) 5', 7'; Izar (0/1) | Report | Try: Plà 1'c M. García 7'm Requena 14'm Con: Algar (1/1) 1'; P. García (0/2) |

Westhills Stadium, Langford
Referee: Sara Cox (England)

11 May 2019
14:56

| United States | 28–7 | Fiji |
| Try: Tapper (2) 0'c, 13'c Kelter 7'c Gustaitis 10'c Con: Kelter (2/2) 1', 7'; Heavirland (2/2) 10', 14' | Report | Try: Naimasi 3'c Con: Sokoiwasa (1/1) 3' |

Westhills Stadium, Langford
Referee: Tyler Miller (Australia)

11 May 2019
17:18

| Fiji | 14–21 | Spain |
| Try: Savu 0'c Sokoiwasa 8'c Con: Sokoiwasa (2/2) 1', 9' | Report | Try: P. García 4'c Requena (2) 6'c, 12'c Con: P. García (2/2) 4', 7'; Casado (1/1) 12' |

Westhills Stadium, Langford
Referee: Beatrice Benvenuti (Italy)

11 May 2019
17:40

| United States | 12–0 | France |
| Try: Kirshe 2'm Fa'avesi 4'c Con: Kelter (1/2) 4' | Report |

Westhills Stadium, Langford
Referee: Tevita Rokovereni (Fiji)

== Knockout stage ==
=== Challenge Trophy ===
Semi-finals
12 May 2019 – 10:46 – Westhills Stadium, Langford
Ireland | 12
China | 19
12 May 2019 – 11:08 – Westhills Stadium, Langford
Fiji | 32
Brazil | 14

Challenge Cup final
12 May 2019 – 14:14 – Westhills Stadium, Langford
China | 19
Fiji | 26
Eleventh place
12 May 2019 – 13:52 – Westhills Stadium, Langford
Ireland | 43
Brazil | 5

Matches

Semifinals

12 May 2019
10:46

| Ireland | 12–19 | China |
| Try: Murphy-Crowe (2) 0'c, 12'm Con: Higgins (1/2) 0' | Report | Try: Chen 4'm Gu 7'c Yu 9'c Con: Chen (2/3) 7', 10' |

Westhills Stadium, Langford
Referee: Tevita Rokovereni (Fiji)

12 May 2019
11:08

| Fiji | 32–14 | Brazil |
| Try: Savu (3) 0'm, 5'm, 7'm Naimasi 7'c Tinai 8'm Solikoviti 12'm Con: Tisolo (1/3) 7'; Seniyasi (0/1); Tinai (0/1); Rokouono (0/1) | Report | Try: B. Silva 3'c Costa 11'c Con: Kochhann (2/2) 4', 11' |

Westhills Stadium, Langford
Referee: Beatrice Benvenuti (Italy)

Eleventh place

12 May 2019
13:52

| Ireland | 43–5 | Brazil |
| Try: Higgins 0'c McGann (2) 2'c, 10'm Murphy-Crowe (3) 4'm, 7'c, 12'm Doyle 14'c Con: Higgins (3/6) 1', 2', 8'; Tyrell (1/1) 14' | Report | Try: Souza 7'm Con: Kochhann (0/1) |

Westhills Stadium, Langford
Referee: Sara Cox (England)

Challenge Cup final

12 May 2019
14:14

| China | 19–26 | Fiji |
| Try: Liping 1'c Gao 7'm Min 10'm Con: Chen (2/3) 1', 11' | Report | Try: Seniyasi 2'm Daveua (2) 4'c, 5'c Solikoviti 12'c Con: Tisolo (3/4) 4', 6', 12' |

Westhills Stadium, Langford
Referee: Tyler Miller (Australia)

=== 5th place ===
Semi-finals
12 May 2019 – 12:24 – Westhills Stadium, Langford
Spain | 0
Canada | 31
12 May 2019 – 12:46 – Westhills Stadium, Langford
England | 29
Russia | 17

Fifth place
12 May 2019 – 15:30 – Westhills Stadium, Langford
Canada | 31
England | 7
Seventh place
12 May 2019 – 15:08 – Westhills Stadium, Langford
Spain | 7
Russia | 24

Matches

Semifinals

12 May 2019
12:24

| Spain | 0–31 | Canada |
| | Report | Try: Farella 0'c Landry (2) 2'm, 5'c Williams 12'c Wardley 14'm Con: Landry (2/3) 1', 5'; Nicholas (1/2) 12' |

Westhills Stadium, Langford
Referee: Tyler Miller (Australia)

12 May 2019
12:46

| England | 29–17 | Russia |
| Try: Kildunne (2) 1'c, 3'm Uren (2) 7'm, 11'; Fleming 10'c Con: Aitchison (2/4) 2', 10' | Report | Try: Zdrokova (2) 5'c, 7'm Mikhaltsova 13'm Con: Seredina (1/2) 5'; Lushina (0/1) |

Westhills Stadium, Langford
Referee: Emily Hsieh (United States)

Seventh place

12 May 2019
15:08

| Spain | 7–24 | Russia |
| Try: P. García 1'c Con: P. García (1/1) 1' | Report | Try: Shestakova 5'm Mikhaltsova 7'c Zdrokova 11'c Noritsina 13'm Con: Seredina (2/3) 8', 11'; Kukina (0/1) |

Westhills Stadium, Langford
Referee: Joy Neville (Ireland)

Fifth place

12 May 2019
15:30

| Canada | 31–7 | England |
| Try: Farella (2) 1'm, 5'm Greenshields 4'c Landry 7'c Williams 7'c Con: Landry (3/5) 4', 7', 7' | Report | Try: Fisher 13'c Con: Aitchison |

Westhills Stadium, Langford
Referee: Emily Hsieh (United States)

=== Cup ===
Quarter-finals
12 May 2019 – 9:18 – Westhills Stadium, Langford
New Zealand | 17
Spain | 7
12 May 2019 – 9:40 – Westhills Stadium, Langford
United States | 12
Canada | 7
12 May 2019 – 10:02 – Westhills Stadium, Langford
England | 12
France | 26
12 May 2019 – 10:24 – Westhills Stadium, Langford
Australia | 31
Russia | 12

Semi-finals
12 May 2019 – 13:08 – Westhills Stadium, Langford
New Zealand | 26
United States | 12
12 May 2019 – 13:30 – Westhills Stadium, Langford
France | 19
Australia | 26

Final
12 May 2019 – 16:18 – Westhills Stadium, Langford
New Zealand | 21
Australia | 17
Third place
12 May 2019 – 15:52 – Westhills Stadium, Langford
United States | 26
France | 5

Matches

Quarterfinals

12 May 2019
9:18

| New Zealand | 17–7 | Spain |
| Try: Tui 2'm Nathan-Wong 6'c Faleafaga 13'm Con: Nathan-Wong (1/3) 6' | Report | Try: M. García 11'c Con: P. García (1/1) 11' |

Westhills Stadium, Langford
Referee: Amy Perrett (Australia)

12 May 2019
9:40

| United States | 12–7 | Canada |
| Try: Kelter (2) 7'c, 13'm Con: Kelter (1/2) 7' | Report | Try: Williams 11'c Con: Landry (1/1) 12' |

Westhills Stadium, Langford
Referee: Sara Cox (England)

12 May 2019
10:02

| England | 12–26 | France |
| Try: Wilson-Hardy 8'c Uren 13'm Con: Aitchison (1/2) 9' | Report | Try: Le Pesq 2'c Izar 5'm Drouin 6'; Grassineau 11'c Con: Izar (1/2) 3'; Drouin (2/2) 7', 12' |

Westhills Stadium, Langford
Referee: Hollie Davidson (Scotland)

12 May 2019
10:24

| Australia | 31–12 | Russia |
| Try: Williams 4'c Green 6'c Caslick 7'm Paki 9'c Tonegato 11'm Con: Treherne (2/3) 4', 7'; Sykes (1/2) 10' | Report | Try: Khamidova 2'm Seredina 8'c Con: Seredina (1/2) 8' |

Westhills Stadium, Langford
Referee: Joy Neville (Ireland)

Semifinals

12 May 2019
13:08

| New Zealand | 26–12 | United States |
| Try: Blyde 0'c Brazier (2) 4'm, 6'c, 11'c Con: Nathan-Wong (3/4) 0', 7', 12' | Report | Try: Tapper 5'm Kirshe 13'c Con: Heavirland (1/2) 14' |

Westhills Stadium, Langford
Referee: Amy Perrett (Australia)

12 May 2019
13:30

| France | 19–26 | Australia |
| Try: Grassineau 1'm Le Pesq 3'c Drouin 11'c Con: Izar (2/3) 4', 12' | Report | Try: Treherne 0'c Tonegato (2) 5'c, 7'c Quirk 9'm Con: Treherne (3/4) 0', 5', 7' |

Westhills Stadium, Langford
Referee: Hollie Davidson (Scotland)

Third Place

12 May 2019
15:52

| United States | 26–5 | France |
| Try: Doyle 6'c Thomas 7'm Kirshe 9'c Canett 10'c Con: Heavirland (3/4) 6', 9', 11' | Report | Try: Okemba 13'm Con: Izar (0/1) |

Westhills Stadium, Langford
Referee: Sara Cox (England)

Final

12 May 2019
16:18

| New Zealand | 21–17 | Australia |
| Try: Hirini 3'c Williams 5'c Nathan-Wong 8'c Con: Nathan-Wong (3/3) 4', 6', 9' | Report | Try: Green (2) 1'm, 13'c Tonegato 7'm Con: Sykes (1/1) 13'; Treherne (0/2) |

Westhills Stadium, Langford
Referee: Hollie Davidson (Scotland)

== Tournament placings ==
| Place | Team | Points |
|---|---|---|
| 1st place, gold medalist(s) | New Zealand | 20 |
| 2nd place, silver medalist(s) | Australia | 18 |
| 3rd place, bronze medalist(s) | United States | 16 |
| 4 | France | 14 |
| 5 | Canada | 12 |
| 6 | England | 10 |

| Place | Team | Points |
|---|---|---|
| 7 | Russia | 8 |
| 8 | Spain | 6 |
| 9 | Fiji | 4 |
| 10 | China | 3 |
| 11 | Ireland | 2 |
| 12 | Brazil | 1 |

Source: World Rugby

== Players ==
=== Scoring leaders ===
Tries scored
| Rank | Player | Tries |
|---|---|---|
| 1 | Amee-Leigh Murphy-Crowe | 8 |
| 1 | Ellia Green | 8 |
| 3 | Charity Williams | 6 |
| 4 | Elena Zdrokova | 5 |
| 4 | Emma Tonegato | 5 |
| 4 | Kelly Brazier | 5 |

Points scored
| Rank | Player | Points |
|---|---|---|
| 1 | Ghislaine Landry | 42 |
| 2 | Amee-Leigh Murphy-Crowe | 40 |
| 2 | Ellia Green | 40 |
| 2 | Tyla Nathan-Wong | 40 |
| 5 | Holly Aitchison | 37 |

Source: World Rugby

== See also ==
- World Rugby Women's Sevens Series
- 2018–19 World Rugby Women's Sevens Series

Women's Sevens Series VII
| Preceded by 2019 Japan Women's Sevens | 2019 Canada Women's Sevens | Succeeded by 2019 France Women's Sevens |
Canada Women's Sevens
| Preceded by 2018 Canada Women's Sevens | 2019 Canada Women's Sevens | Succeeded by 2021 Canada Women's Sevens |
