= 2019 in rugby union =

== Rugby sevens ==
International competitions

- January 5 – 13: 2019 Sudamérica Rugby Sevens in Punta Del Este & Viña del Mar
  - Punta Del Este Sevens: Chile defeated Argentina, 7−5.
  - Viña del Mar Sevens: Chile defeated Uruguay, 31–7.

=== 2018–19 World Rugby Sevens Series ===
- November 30 & December 1, 2018: WRSS #1 in (United Arab Emirates) Dubai
  - Cup: New Zealand; Plate: Fiji; Bowl: Samoa; Shield: Wales
- December 8 & 9, 2018: WRSS #2 in (South Africa) Cape Town
  - Cup: Fiji; Plate: England; Bowl: Argentina; Shield: Kenya
- January 26 & 27: WRSS #3 in (New Zealand) Hamilton
  - Cup: Fiji; Plate: Scotland; Bowl: England; Shield: Tonga
- February 2 & 3: WRSS #4 in (Australia) Sydney
  - Cup: New Zealand; Plate: South Africa; Bowl: Argentina; Shield: Samoa
- March 1 – 3: WRSS #5 in Las Vegas
  - Cup: United States; Plate: England; Bowl: Scotland; Shield: Canada
- March 9 & 10: WRSS #6 in (Canada) Vancouver
  - Cup: South Africa; Plate: New Zealand; Bowl: Australia; Shield: Spain
- April 5 – 7: WRSS #7 in Hong Kong
  - Cup: Fiji; Plate: Argentina; Bowl: Scotland; Shield: Spain
- April 13 & 14: WRSS #8 in Singapore
  - Cup: South Africa; Plate: Samoa; Bowl: France; Shield: Kenya
- May 25 & 26: WRSS #9 in (England) London
  - Cup: Fiji; Plate: New Zealand; Bowl: Samoa; Shield: Japan
- June 1 & 2: WRSS #10 (final) in Paris
  - Cup: Fiji; Plate: France; Bowl: Canada; Shield: Scotland

=== 2018–19 World Rugby Women's Sevens Series ===
- October 20 & 21, 2018: WRWSS #1 in (United States) Glendale
  - Cup: New Zealand; Plate: Australia; Bowl: Spain
- November 29 & 30, 2018: WRWSS #2 in (United Arab Emirates) Dubai
  - Cup: New Zealand; Plate: Russia; Bowl: China
- February 1 – 3: WRWSS #3 in (Australia) Sydney
  - Cup: New Zealand; Plate: Canada; Bowl: Fiji
- April 20 & 21: WRWSS #4 in (Japan) Kitakyushu
  - Cup: Canada; Plate: New Zealand; Bowl: Fiji
- May 11 & 12: WRWSS #5 in Langford
  - Cup: New Zealand; Plate: Canada; Bowl: Fiji
- June 15 & 16: WRWSS #6 (final) in (France) Biarritz
  - Cup: United States; Plate: Australia; Bowl: Fiji

== Rugby union ==
National teams

- September 28, 2018 – June 15, 2019: ///// 2018–19 Rugby Europe Trophy
  - Final Ranking: 1. Portugal, 2. Netherlands, 3. Switzerland, 4. Poland, 5. Lithuania, 6. Czech Republic
- October 13, 2018 – June 1, 2019: 2018–19 Rugby Europe Conference
  - Conference 1 North Final Ranking: 1. Ukraine, 2. Sweden, 3. Luxembourg, 4. Hungary, 5. Moldova
  - Conference 1 South Final Ranking: 1. Malta, 2. Croatia, 3. Israel, 4. Cyprus, 5. Bosnia and Herzegovina
  - Conference 2 North Final Ranking: 1. Latvia, 2. Finland, 3. Denmark, 4. Norway, 5. Austria
  - Conference 2 South Final Ranking: 1. Slovenia, 2. Bulgaria, 3. Serbia, 4. Andorra, 5. Slovakia
- February 1 – March 15: // (Republic of Ireland) /// 2019 Six Nations Under 20s Championship
  - Champions: Ireland; Second: France; Third: England; Fourth: Wales; Fifth: Italy; Sixth: Scotland
- February 1 – March 16: // (Republic of Ireland) /// 2019 Six Nations Championship
  - Champions: Wales; Second: England; Third: Ireland; Fourth: France; Fifth: Scotland; Sixth: Italy
- February 1 – March 17: // (Republic of Ireland) /// 2019 Women's Six Nations Championship
  - Champions: England; Second: Italy; Third: France; Fourth: Wales; Fifth: Ireland; Sixth: Scotland
- February 2 – March 9: ///// 2019 Americas Rugby Championship
  - Champions: Argentina XV; Second: Uruguay; Third: United States; Fourth: Brazil; Fifth: Canada; Sixth: Chile
- February 9 – March 17: / (Georgia (country)) //// 2019 Rugby Europe Championship
  - Champions: Georgia; Second: Spain; Third: Romania; Fourth: Russia; Fifth: Belgium; Sixth: Germany
- May 18 – June 29: // 2019 Asia Rugby Championship
  - Champions: Hong Kong; Second: South Korea; Third: Malaysia
- June 4 – 22: (Argentina) 2019 World Rugby Under 20 Championship
  - France defeated Australia, 24–23, to win their second consecutive World Rugby Under 20 Championship title.
  - South Africa took third place.
- June 29 – September 21: /// 2019 Victoria Cup
  - Champions: Zimbabwe; Second: Kenya; Third: Uganda; Fourth: Zambia
- July 20 – August 10: /// 2019 Rugby Championship
  - Champions: South Africa; Second: Australia; Third: New Zealand; Fourth: Argentina
- July 28 – August 3: // 2019 West African Series
  - Champions: Ivory Coast; Second: Nigeria; Third: Ghana
- September 20 – November 2: 2019 Rugby World Cup in Japan
  - South Africa defeated England, 32–12, to win their third Rugby World Cup title.
  - New Zealand took third place.
- November 18 – 30: 2019 Oceania Rugby Women's Championship in Fiji

Club teams

- August 31, 2018 – May 25, 2019: (Ireland) / (Italy) / (Scotland) / (South Africa) / (Wales) 2018–19 Pro14
  - (Ireland) Leinster defeated (Scotland) Glasgow Warriors, 18–15, to win their second consecutive and sixth overall Pro14 title.
- August 31, 2018 – June 1, 2019: (England) 2018–19 Gallagher Premiership
  - (England) Saracens F.C. defeated fellow English team, Exeter Chiefs, 37–34, to win their second consecutive and fifth overall Premiership Rugby title.
- October 12, 2018 – May 10, 2019: 2018–19 European Rugby Challenge Cup (final in Newcastle)
  - (France) Clermont defeated fellow French team, La Rochelle, 36–16, to win their third European Rugby Challenge Cup title.
- October 12, 2018 – May 11, 2019: 2018–19 European Rugby Champions Cup (final in Newcastle)
  - (England) Saracens F.C. defeated (Ireland) Leinster, 20–10, to win their third European Rugby Champions Cup title.
- October 13, 2018 – May 10, 2019: 2018–19 European Rugby Continental Shield
  - Both (Russia) Enisey-STM and (Italy) Calvisano have qualified to compete at the 2019–20 European Rugby Challenge Cup.
- November 9, 2018 – May 4, 2019: 2018–19 RFU Championship Cup in England and Jersey (debut event)
  - The Ealing Trailfinders defeated the London Irish, 23–17, to win the inaugural RFU Championship Cup title.
- January 26 – June 16: (United States) / (Canada) 2019 Major League Rugby season
  - The (United States) Seattle Seawolves defeated a fellow American team, the San Diego Legion, 26–23, to win their second consecutive Major League Rugby title.
- February 14 – July 5: (Argentina) / (Australia) / (Japan) / (New Zealand) / (South Africa) 2019 Super Rugby season
  - The (New Zealand) Crusaders defeated the (Argentina) Jaguares, 19–3, to win their third consecutive and tenth overall Super Rugby championship title.
- August 31 – October 26: (Australia) / (Fiji) 2019 National Rugby Championship
  - The Western Force defeated the Canberra Vikings, 41–3, to win their first National Rugby Championship title.

== See also ==
- 2019 in sports
