= 2019 Sydney Women's Sevens =

- Women's Sevens Series VII
- Host nation: Australia
- Date: 1–3 February 2019

Cup
- Champion: New Zealand
- Runner-up: Australia
- Third: United States

Challenge Trophy
- Winner: Fiji

Tournament details
- Matches played: 34
- Tries scored: 182 (average 5.35 per match)
- Most points: Amee-Leigh Murphy-Crowe (45)
- Most tries: Amee-Leigh Murphy-Crowe (9)

The 2019 Sydney Women's Sevens was the third tournament within the 2018–19 World Rugby Women's Sevens Series and the third edition of the Australian Women's Sevens. It was held over the weekend of 1–3 February 2019 at Spotless Stadium in Sydney, with former venue Allianz Stadium closed for rebuilding. It was run alongside the men's tournament.

== Format ==
The teams are drawn into three pools of four teams each. Each team plays every other team in their pool once. The top two teams from each pool advance to the Cup brackets while the top 2 third place teams also compete in the Cup/Plate. The other teams from each group play-off for the Challenge Trophy.

== Teams ==
Eleven core teams are participating in the tournament along with one invited team, the highest-placing non-core team of the 2018 Oceania Women's Sevens Championship, Papua New Guinea:

- Australia
- Canada
- China
- England
- Fiji
- France
- Ireland
- New Zealand
- Papua New Guinea
- Russia
- Spain
- United States

== Pool stage ==
All times in Australian Eastern Daylight Time (UTC+11:00)

=== Pool A ===
Team	Pld	W	D	L	PF	PA	PD	Pts
New Zealand	3	3	0	0	98	12	+86	9
France	3	2	0	1	87	45	+42	7
England	3	1	0	2	50	61	–11	5
Papua New Guinea	3	0	0	3	10	127	–117	3

1 February 2019
12:44

England	14–27	France
Try: Matthews 8'c Uren 12'c Con: Aitchison (1/1) 8'; Jones (1/1) 12'		Try: Ciofani (2) 2'm, 5'm Drouin 7'm Horta (2) 7'c, 14'm Con: Izar (1/3) 7'; Drouin (0/2)

Spotless Stadium, Sydney
Referee: Tevita Rokovereni (Fiji)

1 February 2019
13:06

New Zealand	38–5	Papua New Guinea
Try: Hirini 3'm Nathan-Wong 6'c Williams 8'c Broughton 9'c Baker 11'm Tui 13'c Con: Nathan-Wong (3/4) 7', 8', 10'; Whata-Simpkins (1/2) 14'		Try: Rama 4'm Con: Lavai (0/1)

Spotless Stadium, Sydney
Referee: Sakurako Kawasaki (Japan)

1 February 2019
15:28

England	36–5	Papua New Guinea
Try: Quansah (2) 1'm, 6'm Rowland 4'c Fleming 7'm Allan (2) 11'c, 13'c Con: Aitchison (1/4) 4'; Rowland (2/2) 12', 14'		Try: Sampson 2'm Con: Lavai (0/1)

Spotless Stadium, Sydney
Referee: Tyler Miller (Australia)

1 February 2019
15:50

New Zealand	31–7	France
Try: Blyde (2) 2'c, 14'm Waaka 6'c Broughton 7'm Nathan-Wong 9'c Con: Nathan-Wong (2/3) 2', 6', 10'; Whata-Simpkins (0/1)		Try: Pelle 4'c Con: Izar (1/1) 4'

Spotless Stadium, Sydney
Referee: Joy Neville (Ireland)

1 February 2019
18:12

France	53–0	Papua New Guinea
Try: Izar 0'c Horta (3) 2'm, 13'c, 14'c Lothoz 4'm Neissen 7'm Pelle 8'c Grisez 9'm Izar 11'c Con: Drouin (1/2) 0'; Izar (2/5) 8', 12'; Torres Duxans (2/2) 13', 14'

Spotless Stadium, Sydney
Referee: Lauren Jenner (New Zealand)

1 February 2019
18:34

New Zealand	29–0	England
Try: Williams 2'm Broughton 6'c Blyde 8'c Baker 10'm Saili 13'm Con: Tyla Nathan-Wong (2/5) 6', 9'

Spotless Stadium, Sydney
Referee: Hollie Davidson (Scotland)

=== Pool B ===
Team	Pld	W	D	L	PF	PA	PD	Pts
Ireland	3	2	1	0	46	40	+6	8
Russia	3	1	1	1	31	35	–4	6
Canada	3	1	0	2	57	39	+18	5
Fiji	3	1	0	2	52	72	–20	5

1 February 2019
12:00

Russia	7–7	Ireland
Try: Bystrova 13'c Con: Lushina (1/1) 13'		Try: Higgins 11'c Con: Mulhall (1/1) 12'

Spotless Stadium, Sydney
Referee: Amy Perrett (Australia)

1 February 2019
12:22

Canada	36–12	Fiji
Try: Farella (2) 1'm, 3'c Greenshields 4'c Benn (2) 7'm, 10'c Chown 8'm Con: Landry (2/3) 4', 5'; Nicholas (1/3) 10'		Try: Tinai 12'; Naimasi 14'c Con: Tisolo (1/1) 14'

Spotless Stadium, Sydney
Referee: Joy Neville (Ireland)

1 February 2019
14:44

Russia	12–21	Fiji
Try: Zdrokova 7'm Seredina 14'c Con: Lushina (1/2) 14'		Try: Tisolo (2) 2'c, 7'c Naimasi 13'c Con: Tisolo (2/2) 3', 8'; Seniyasi (1/1) 13'

Spotless Stadium, Sydney
Referee: Sakurako Kawasaki (Japan)

1 February 2019
15:06

Canada	14–15	Ireland
Try: Landry 1'c Nicholas 3'c Con: Landry (2/2) 1', 4'		Try: Tyrrell 5'm Galvin 7'm Murphy-Crowe 10'm Con: Mulhall (0/3)

Spotless Stadium, Sydney
Referee: Hollie Davidson (Scotland)

1 February 2019
17:28

Ireland	24–19	Fiji
Try: Murphy-Crowe (3) 2'm, 6'c, 7'c Parsons 5'm Con: Mulhall (2/4) 6', 8'		Try: Roqica 0'm Naimasi 8'c Daveua 11'c Con: Tisolo (1/2) 9'; Tinai (1/1) 12'

Spotless Stadium, Sydney
Referee: Madeline Putz (Australia)

1 February 2019
17:50

Canada	7–12	Russia
Try: Farella 4'c Con: Landry (1/1) 4'		Try: Zdrokova 0'c Mikhaltsova 10'm Con: Lushina (1/2) 1'

Spotless Stadium, Sydney
Referee: Tevita Rokovereni (Fiji)

=== Pool C ===
Team	Pld	W	D	L	PF	PA	PD	Pts
Australia	3	2	0	1	55	26	+29	7
United States	3	2	0	1	59	43	+16	7
Spain	3	2	0	1	35	45	–10	7
China	3	0	0	3	29	64	–35	3

1 February 2019
13:28

United States	26–10	China
Try: Tapper 3'c Fa'avesi 8'c Thomas 10'm Kirshe 13'; Con: Heavirland (3/4) 4', 8', 13'		Try: Liu (2) 2'm, 7'm Con: Chen K. (0/2)

Spotless Stadium, Sydney
Referee: Madeline Putz (Australia)

1 February 2019
13:50

Australia	19–0	Spain
Try: Green 7'm Sykes 9'c Pelite 10'c Con: Sykes (2/3) 9', 11'

Spotless Stadium, Sydney
Referee: Hollie Davidson (Scotland)

1 February 2019
16:12

United States	14–21	Spain
Try: Thomas 4'c Kirshe 7'c Con: Heavirland (2/2) 5', 7'		Try: Erbina 5'c Bravo 9'c García 13'c Con: García (2/2) 6', 9', 13'

Spotless Stadium, Sydney
Referee: Amy Perrett (Australia)

1 February 2019
16:34

Australia	24–7	China
Try: Pelite 0'm Quirk 1'm Williams 5'c Green 9'c Con: Sykes (2/4) 5', 9'		Try: Gu 13'c Con: Chen K. (1/1) 14'

Spotless Stadium, Sydney
Referee: Lauren Jenner (New Zealand)

1 February 2019
18:56

Australia	12–19	United States
Try: Pelite 11'c Tonegato 14'm Con: Sykes (1/2) 11'		Try: Gray 2'c Kirshe 4'c Tapper 6'm Con: Heavirland (2/3) 2', 4'

Spotless Stadium, Sydney
Referee: Joy Neville (Ireland)

1 February 2019
19:18

China	12–14	Spain
Try: Chen K. 8'm Liu 14'c Con: Chen K. (1/1) 14'; Gu (0/1)		Try: Echebarría 5'c García 10'c Con: García (2/2) 6', 11'

Spotless Stadium, Sydney
Referee: Tyler Miller (Australia)

== Knockout stage ==
=== Challenge Trophy ===
Semi-finals
2 February 2019 – 12:06 – Spotless Stadium, Sydney
England	54
Papua New Guinea	0
2 February 2019 – 12:28 – Spotless Stadium, Sydney
Fiji	12
China	0

Final
2 February 2019 – 17:56 – Spotless Stadium, Sydney
England	12
Fiji	15
Eleventh place
2 February 2019 – 17:34 – Spotless Stadium, Sydney
Papua New Guinea	0
China	31

Matches

Semifinals

2 February 2019
12:06

England	54–0	Papua New Guinea
Try: Aitchison (2) 1'c, 9'c Uren 3'c Fleming 5'c Rowland 7'c Adam (2) 11'c, 14'c Quansah 13'c Con: Aitchison (4/4) 1', 4', 5', 7', 10'; Rowland (2/3) 11', 14'

Spotless Stadium, Sydney
Referee: Tyler Miller (Australia)

2 February 2019
12:28

Fiji	12–0	China
Try: Cumu 6'c Rokouono 11'm Con: Tisolo (1/2) 7'

Spotless Stadium, Sydney
Referee: Sakurako Kawasaki (Japan)

Eleventh Place

2 February 2019
17:34

Papua New Guinea	0–31	China
		Try: Chen K. (3) 4'c, 9'c, 14'm Yu 6'c Chen M. 11'm Con: Chen K. (3/5) 4', 6', 9'

Spotless Stadium, Sydney
Referee: Madeline Putz (Australia)

Final

2 February 2019
17:56

England	12–15	Fiji
Try: Fleming 3'm Matthews 10'c Con: Aitchison (1/2) 11'		Try: Seniyasi 5'm Tinai 8'm Savu 12'; Con: Seniyasi (0/2); Rokouono (0/1)

Spotless Stadium, Sydney
Referee: Lauren Jenner (New Zealand)

=== 5th Place ===
Semi-finals
3 February 2019 – 8:50 – Spotless Stadium, Sydney
Canada	12
Russia	5
3 February 2019 – 9:12 – Spotless Stadium, Sydney
Spain	12
France	19

Final
3 February 2019 – 17:42 – Spotless Stadium, Sydney
Canada	19
France	17
Seventh Place
3 February 2019 – 17:20 – Spotless Stadium, Sydney
Russia	34
Spain	5

Matches

Semifinals

3 February 2019
8:50

Canada	12–5	Russia
Try: Farella 4'c Lukan 6'm Con: Landry (1/2) 4'		Try: Bystrova 9'm Con: Seredina (0/1)

Spotless Stadium, Sydney
Referee: Tevita Rokovereni (Fiji)

3 February 2019
9:12

Spain	12–19	France
Try: García (2) 3'm, 5'c Con: García (1/2) 6'		Try: Okemba 0'm Drouin 7'c Ciofani 13'c Con: Izar (1/2) 7'; Drouin (1/1) 14'

Spotless Stadium, Sydney
Referee: Joy Neville (Ireland)

Seventh Place

3 February 2019
17:20

Russia	34–5	Spain
Try: Khamidova (2) 2'm, 7'm Seredina 5'm Bystrova 7'c Noritsina 10'm Lushina 14'c Con: Lushina (2/3) 7', 14'; Kukina (0/1); Seredina (0/2)		Try: Dominguez Sanchez 1'm Con: García (0/1)

Spotless Stadium, Sydney
Referee: Lauren Jenner (New Zealand)

Final

3 February 2019
17:42

Canada	19–17	France
Try: Farella (2) 6'c, 13'c Landry 8'm Con: Landry (2/3) 6', 13'		Try: Izar (2) 0'm, 7'c Lothoz 9'm Con: Drouin (1/3) 7'

Spotless Stadium, Sydney
Referee: Amy Perrett (Australia)

=== Cup ===
Quarter-finals
2 February 2019 – 12:50 – Spotless Stadium, Sydney
New Zealand	17
Canada	7
2 February 2019 – 13:12 – Spotless Stadium, Sydney
Russia	5
United States	7
2 February 2019 – 13:34 – Spotless Stadium, Sydney
Ireland	22
Spain	7
2 February 2019 – 13:56 – Spotless Stadium, Sydney
Australia	21
France	17

Semi-finals
3 February 2019 – 9:34 – Spotless Stadium, Sydney
New Zealand	29
United States	5
3 February 2019 – 9:56 – Spotless Stadium, Sydney
Ireland	12
Australia	24

Final
3 February 2019 – 18:31 – Spotless Stadium, Sydney
New Zealand	34
Australia	10
Third place
3 February 2019 – 18:04 – Spotless Stadium, Sydney
United States	26
Ireland	10

Matches

Quarterfinals

2 February 2019
12:50

New Zealand	17–7	Canada
Try: Tui 2'm Hirini 7'm Fitzpatrick 8'c Con: Whata-Simpkins (1/1) 8'; Nathan-Wong (0/1); Fitzpatrick (0/1)		Try: Landry 5'c Con: Landry (1/1) 5'

Spotless Stadium, Sydney
Referee: Hollie Davidson (Scotland)

2 February 2019
13:12

Russia	5–7	United States
Try: Khamidova 1'm Con: Lushina (0/1)		Try: Emba 13'c Con: Heavirland (1/1) 13'

Spotless Stadium, Sydney
Referee: Joy Neville (Ireland)

2 February 2019
13:34

Ireland	22–7	Spain
Try: Higgins 1'c Murphy-Crowe (2) 9'c, 11'm Con: Mulhall (2/3) 1', 9'		Try: Erbina 14'c Con: Algar (1/1) 14'; Pen: Mulhall (1/1) 7'

Spotless Stadium, Sydney
Referee: Amy Perrett (Australia)

2 February 2019
13:56

Australia	21–17	France
Try: Sykes 4'c Williams 6'c Dick 8'c Con: Sykes (3/3) 4', 6', 9'		Try: Neissen 7'm Ciofani 11'm Lothaz 13'c Con: Izar (0/1); Drouin (1/2) 13'

Spotless Stadium, Sydney
Referee: Tevita Rokovereni (Fiji)

Semifinals

3 February 2019
9:34

New Zealand	29–5	United States
Try: Blyde 1'c Tui 4'm Broughton 6'c Baker 8'm Katarina Whata-Simpkins 11'm Con: Whata-Simpkins (2/6) 2', 6'		Try: Doyle 13'm Con: Heavirland (0/1)

Spotless Stadium, Sydney
Referee: Amy Perrett (Australia)

3 February 2019
9:56

Ireland	12–24	Australia
Try: Murphy-Crowe (2) 8'm, 11'c Con: Mulhall (1/2) 11'		Try: Green (3) 2'c, 3'c, 13'; Tonegato 6'm Con: Sykes (2/3) 2', 4'

Spotless Stadium, Sydney

Third Place

3 February 2019
18:04

United States	26–10	Ireland
Try: Thomas 0'c, 6'm Kristi Kirshe (2) 4'c, 11'c Con: Heavirland (3/4) 0', 5', 11'		Try: Amee-Leigh Murphy-Crowe 7'm Higgins 10'm Con: Mulhall (0/2)

Spotless Stadium, Sydney
Referee: Tevita Rokovereni (Fiji)

Final

3 February 2019
18:31

New Zealand	34–10	Australia
Try: Waaka (2) 1'm, 11'm Baker 6'c Blyde (3) 7'm, 7'c, 13'm Con: Whata-Simpkins (2/4) 6', 8'; Broughton (0/1)		Try: Sykes (2) 4'm, 9'm Con: Sykes (0/2)

Spotless Stadium, Sydney
Referee: Hollie Davidson (Scotland)

== Tournament placings ==
Place	Team	Points
1st place, gold medalist(s)	New Zealand	20
2nd place, silver medalist(s)	Australia	18
3rd place, bronze medalist(s)	United States	16
4	Ireland	14
5	Canada	12
6	France	10

Place	Team	Points
7	Russia	8
8	Spain	6
9	Fiji	4
10	England	3
11	China	2
12	Papua New Guinea	1

Source: World Rugby

== Players ==
=== Scoring leaders ===
Tries scored
Rank	Player	Tries
1	Amee-Leigh Murphy-Crowe	9
2	Michaela Blyde	7
3	Bianca Farella	6
4	Ellia Green	5
4	Fanny Horta	5

Points scored
Rank	Player	Points
1	Amee-Leigh Murphy-Crowe	45
2	Emma Sykes	40
3	Michaela Blyde	35
4	Ghislaine Landry	33
5	Patricia García	32

Source: World Rugby

== See also ==
- World Rugby Women's Sevens Series
- 2018–19 World Rugby Women's Sevens Series
- 2019 Sydney Sevens

Women's Sevens Series VII
Preceded by 2018 Dubai Women's Sevens	2019 Sydney Women's Sevens	Succeeded by 2019 Japan Women's Sevens
Australian Women's Sevens
Preceded by 2018 Sydney Women's Sevens	2019 Sydney Women's Sevens	Succeeded by 2020 Sydney Women's Sevens
