= 2019 France Women's Sevens =

- Women's Sevens Series VII
- Host nation: France
- Date: 15–16 June 2019

Cup
- Champion: United States
- Runner-up: New Zealand
- Third: Canada

Tournament details
- Matches played: 34
- Tries scored: 205 (average 6.03 per match)
- Most points: Tyla Nathan-Wong (34)
- Most tries: 6 Players (6)

The 2019 France Women's Sevens is the final tournament within the 2018–19 World Rugby Women's Sevens Series and the fourth edition of the France Women's Sevens. For the first time in the tournament's history, it is held over the weekend of 15–16 June 2019 at Parc des Sports Aguiléra in Biarritz. With New Zealand already qualified for the 2020 Summer Olympics, and the United States only needing to field a team to become eligible, the remaining two slots shall be determined over the weekend based upon overall series ranking.

== Format ==
The teams are drawn into three pools of four teams each. Each team plays every other team in their pool once. The top two teams from each pool advance to the Cup brackets while the top 2 third place teams also compete in the Cup/Plate. The other teams from each group play-off for the Challenge Trophy.

== Teams ==
Eleven core teams are participating in the tournament along with one invited team, Scotland:

- Australia
- Canada
- China
- England
- Fiji
- France
- Ireland
- New Zealand
- Russia
- Scotland
- Spain
- United States

== Pool stage ==
All times in Central European Summer Time (UTC+02:00)

=== Pool A ===
Team	Pld	W	D	L	PF	PA	PD	Pts
New Zealand	3	3	0	0	102	21	+81	9
Russia	3	2	0	1	48	56	–8	7
England	3	0	1	2	48	68	–20	4
Scotland	3	0	1	2	46	99	–53	4

15 June 2019
13:14

England	10–17	Russia
Try: Fleming (2) 2'm, 3'm Con: Kildunne (0/2)	Report	Try: Zdrokova (2) 7'c, 13'm Shestakova 8'm Con: Lushina (1/1) 7'; Kulkova (0/2)

Parc des Sports Aguiléra, Biarritz
Referee: Adam Jones (Wales)

15 June 2019
13:36

New Zealand	44–7	Scotland
Try: Tui 0'm Blyde (2) 3'c, 9'm Nathan-Wong 6'c Hirini 7'm Brazier 11'm Saili 13'm Baker 14'm Con: Nathan-Wong (2/5) 4', 7'; Robins-Reti (0/3)	Report	Try: Lloyd 5'c Con: Nelson (1/1) 6'

Parc des Sports Aguiléra, Biarritz
Referee: Ashleigh Murray (South Africa)

15 June 2019
15:58

England	24–24	Scotland
Try: Kildunne 1'm Fleming (2) 5'c, 7'm Wilcock 13'c Con: Kildunne (1/2) 6'; Mason (1/1) 14'; Jones (0/1)	Report	Try: Lloyd (2) 0'c, 4'c Gaffney 7'm Evans 10'm Con: Nelson (2/4) 1', 4'

Parc des Sports Aguiléra, Biarritz
Referee: Emily Hsieh (United States)

15 June 2019
16:20

New Zealand	31–0	Russia
Try: Faleafaga 3'c Tui 7'c Baker (2) 8'c, 13'm Saili 11'm Con: Nathan-Wong (3/5) 3', 7', 9'	Report

Parc des Sports Aguiléra, Biarritz
Referee: Hollie Davidson (Scotland)

15 June 2019
18:42

Russia	31–15	Scotland
Try: Mikhaltsova (3) 0'm, 5'c, 13'c Khamidova 2'm Shestakova 11'c Con: Seredina (1/2) 5'; Lushina (2/2) 11', 13'; Kulkova (0/1)	Report	Try: Smith 4'm Lloyd 9'm Gaffney 14'm Con: Nelson (0/2); Rollie (0/1)

Parc des Sports Aguiléra, Biarritz
Referee: Beatrice Benvenuti (Italy)

15 June 2019
19:04

New Zealand	27–14	England
Try: Saili (2) 2'm, 6'm Blyde 7'c Baker (2) 10'm, 12'm Con: Nathan-Wong (1/5) 8'	Report	Try: Fisher 4'c Kildunne 14'c Con: Kildunne (2/2) 4', 14'

Parc des Sports Aguiléra, Biarritz
Referee: Joy Neville (Ireland)

=== Pool B ===
Team	Pld	W	D	L	PF	PA	PD	Pts
Australia	3	3	0	0	85	33	+52	9
Canada	3	2	0	1	63	56	+7	7
Spain	3	1	0	2	45	63	–18	5
Ireland	3	0	0	3	25	66	–41	3

15 June 2019
12:30

Canada	22–19	Spain
Try: Landry 1'm Benn 3'c Farella 6'm Nicholas 11'm Con: Landry (1/3) 4'; Nicholas (0/1)	Report	Try: Fresneda 9'm Casado 13'c L. Erbina 14'c Con: Casado (2/2) 13', 14'; García (0/1)

Parc des Sports Aguiléra, Biarritz
Referee: Emily Hsieh (United States)

15 June 2019
12:52

Australia	27–5	Ireland
Try: Tonegato (2) 0'c, 7'm Pelite (2) 3'm, 13'm Green 11'm Con: Treherne (1/3) 1'; Brown (0/2)	Report	Try: Flood 9'm Con: Higgins (0/1)

Parc des Sports Aguiléra, Biarritz
Referee: Hollie Davidson (Scotland)

15 June 2019
15:14

Canada	27–10	Ireland
Try: Lukan (2) 4'm, 12'm Farella (2) 6'm, 7'm Benn 8'c Con: Landry (1/5) 9'	Report	Try: Higgins 1'm Murphy-Crowe 3'm Con: Higgins (0/2)

Parc des Sports Aguiléra, Biarritz
Referee: Adam Jones (Wales)

15 June 2019
15:36

Australia	31–14	Spain
Try: Paki 2'm Tonegato (2) 4'm, 9'c Treherne 6'c Caslick 13'c Con: Treherne (1/3) 6'; Brown (2/2) 10', 13'	Report	Try: Losada 1'c Fernández de Corres 8'm Con: García (2/2) 1', 8'

Parc des Sports Aguiléra, Biarritz
Referee: Sakurako Kawasaki (Japan)

15 June 2019
17:58

Spain	12–10	Ireland
Try: Losada 2'c Hurtado 11'm Con: García (1/1) 2'; Casado (0/1)	Report	Try: Lane 0'm Murphy-Crowe 7'm Con: Higgins (0/2)

Parc des Sports Aguiléra, Biarritz
Referee: Ashleigh Murray (South Africa)

15 June 2019
18:20

Australia	27–14	Canada
Try: Caslick (3) 3'm, 7'c 8'm Green (2) 11'm, 13'm Con: Treherne (1/3) 7'; Brown (0/2)	Report	Try: Farella 2'c Williams 12'c Con: Landry (2/2) 2', 13'

Parc des Sports Aguiléra, Biarritz
Referee: Sara Cox (England)

=== Pool C ===
Team	Pld	W	D	L	PF	PA	PD	Pts
United States	3	3	0	0	69	24	+45	9
France	3	2	0	1	72	19	+53	7
China	3	1	0	2	20	86	–66	5
Fiji	3	0	0	3	26	58	–32	3

15 June 2019
13:58

United States	36–5	China
Try: Tapper 2'm Thomas (2) 4'c, 5'm Maher 7'm Doyle 8'c Rovetti 11'c Con: Heavirland (3/6) 4', 9', 12'	Report	Try: Chen K. 1'm Con: Chen K. (0/1)

Parc des Sports Aguiléra, Biarritz
Referee: Sakurako Kawasaki (Japan)

15 June 2019
14:20

France	29–0	Fiji
Try: Grassineau 0'm Neisen (2) 3'c, 8'm Izar 6'c Horta 11'm Con: Izar (2/4) 4', 6'; Le Pesq (0/1)	Report

Parc des Sports Aguiléra, Biarritz
Referee: Sara Cox (England)

15 June 2019
16:42

United States	14–12	Fiji
Try: Doyle 6'c Thomas 10'c Con: Heavirland (2/2) 10'	Report	Try: Solikoviti 2'm Daveua 8'c Con: Seniyasi (1/1) 9'; Tisolo (0/1)

Parc des Sports Aguiléra, Biarritz
Referee: Joy Neville (Ireland)

15 June 2019
17:04

France	36–0	China
	Report

Parc des Sports Aguiléra, Biarritz
Referee: Beatrice Benvenuti (Italy)

15 June 2019
19:26

Fiji	14–15	China
Try: Naimasi 5'c Savu 11'c Con: Riwai (1/1) 5'; Tinai (1/1) 12'	Report	Try: Chen K. 1'm Yan 4'm Lyu 13'm Con: Chen K. (0/3)

Parc des Sports Aguiléra, Biarritz
Referee: Adam Jones (Wales)

15 June 2019
19:48

United States	19–7	France
Try: Emba 2'c Kirshe 7'm Doyle 10'c Con: Kelter (2/3) 3', 10'	Report	Try: Penalty try 13'

Parc des Sports Aguiléra, Biarritz
Referee: Hollie Davidson (Scotland)

== Knockout stage ==
=== Challenge Trophy ===
Semi-finals
16 June – 12:28 – Parc des Sports Aguiléra
England	24
Ireland	17
16 June – 12:50 – Parc des Sports Aguiléra
Scotland	10
Fiji	31

Challenge Cup final
16 June – 15:57 – Parc des Sports Aguiléra
England	10
Fiji	27
Eleventh place
16 June – 15:35 – Parc des Sports Aguiléra
Ireland	14
Scotland	26

Matches

Semifinals

16 June 2019
12:28

England	24–17	Ireland
Try: Fleming 1'c Wilcock 7'm Fisher 7'c Quansah 12'm Con: Kildunne (1/2) 1'; Mason (1/2) 8'	Report	Try: Higgins 2'm Boles 9'c Murphy-Crowe 14'm Con: Higgins (1/3) 10'

Parc des Sports Aguiléra, Biarritz
Referee: Beatrice Benvenuti (Italy)

16 June 2019
12:50

Scotland	10–31	Fiji
Try: Evans 4'm Lloyd 8'm Con: Nelson (0/2)	Report	Try: Solikoviti 1'm Daveua (2) 2'm, 12'c Sokoiwasa 5'c Naimasi 10'c Con: Riwai (1/3) 6'; Tisolo (2/2) 11', 12'

Parc des Sports Aguiléra, Biarritz
Referee: Adam Jones (Wales)

Eleventh place

16 June 2019
15:35

Ireland	14–26	Scotland
Try: Burns 4'c Murphy-Crowe 14'c Con: Higgins (1/1) 4'; Tyrell (1/1) 14'	Report	Try: Gaffney 0'c Thomson 7'm Lloyd 10'c Nelson 13'c Con: Nelson (3/4) 1', 10', 13'

Parc des Sports Aguiléra, Biarritz
Referee: Beatrice Benvenuti (Italy)

Challenge Cup final

16 June 2019
15:57

England	10–27	Fiji
Try: Quansah (2) 1'm, 11'm Con: Kildunne (0/1); Mason (0/1)	Report	Try: Sokoiwasa 3'c Roqica 5'm Riwai 6'm Daveua 8'm Naimasi 13'm Con: Riwai (1/4) 3'; Tisolo (0/1)

Parc des Sports Aguiléra, Biarritz
Referee: Joy Neville (Ireland)

=== 5th place ===
Semi-finals
16 June – 14:07 – Parc des Sports Aguiléra
Australia	31
Russia	21
16 June – 14:29 – Parc des Sports Aguiléra
France	21
China	14

Fifth place
16 June – 17:13 – Parc des Sports Aguiléra
Australia	24
France	10
Seventh place
16 June – 16:51 – Parc des Sports Aguiléra
Russia	12
China	26

Matches

Semifinals

16 June 2019
14:07

Australia	31–21	Russia
Try: Tonegato (2) 5', 11'; Pelite (2) 6', 13'; Green 10'c Con: Treherne (2/3) 5', 10'; Brown (1/2) 11'	Report	Try: Shestakova 2'c Mikhaltsova 7'c Khamidova 14'c Con: Kulkova (2/2) 3', 8'; Seredina (1/1) 14'

Parc des Sports Aguiléra, Biarritz
Referee: Ashleigh Murray (South Africa)

16 June 2019
14:29

France	21–14	China
Try: Grassineau 5'c Pelle 9'c Bertrand 12'c Con: Izar (2/2) 5', 10'; Drouin (1/1) 12'	Report	Try: Chen K. 1'c Lyu 6'c Con: Chen K. (2/2) 2', 7'

Parc des Sports Aguiléra, Biarritz
Referee: Sakurako Kawasaki (Japan)

Seventh place

16 June 2019
16:51

Russia	12–26	China
Try: Mikhaltsova 6'm Khamidova 10'c Con: Lushina (1/1) 11'; Kulkova (0/1)	Report	Try: Lyu 1'c Yang X. 3'm Chen K. 9'c Ruan 12'c Con: Chen K. (2/3) 1', 12'; Yang X. (1/1) 9'

Parc des Sports Aguiléra, Biarritz
Referee: Adam Jones (Wales)

Fifth place

16 June 2019
17:13

Australia	24–10	France
Try: Caslick 0'm Williams 6'c Green (2) 10'c, 12'm Con: Treherne (1/2) 6'; Brown (1/2) 11'	Report	Try: Ciofani 4'm Le Pesq 7'm Con: Izar (0/1); Drouin (0/1)

Parc des Sports Aguiléra, Biarritz
Referee: Beatrice Benvenuti (Italy)

=== Cup ===
Quarter-finals
16 June – 11:00 – Parc des Sports Aguiléra
Australia	14
Spain	15
16 June – 11:22 – Parc des Sports Aguiléra
United States	27
Russia	12
16 June – 11:44 – Parc des Sports Aguiléra
Canada	12
France	5
16 June – 12:06 – Parc des Sports Aguiléra
New Zealand	36
China	0

Semi-finals
16 June – 14:51 – Parc des Sports Aguiléra
Spain	7
United States	24
16 June – 15:13 – Parc des Sports Aguiléra
Canada	12
New Zealand	21

Final
16 June – 18:00 – Parc des Sports Aguiléra
United States	26
New Zealand	10
Third place
16 June – 17:35 – Parc des Sports Aguiléra
Spain	14
Canada	19

Matches

Quarterfinals

16 June 2019
11:00

Australia	14–15	Spain
Try: Green 6'c Caslick 8'c Con: Treherne (2/2) 6', 9'	Report	Try: García 1'm L. Erbina 10'm Requena 11'm Con: García (0/3)

Parc des Sports Aguiléra, Biarritz
Referee: Hollie Davidson (Scotland)

16 June 2019
11:22

United States	27–12	Russia
Try: Maher 0'm Thomas (2) 3'm, 11'c Tapper 8'm Kirshe 13'm Con: Heavirland (1/5) 12'	Report	Try: Seredina 7'm Zdrokova 9'c Con: Seredina (1/2) 10'

Parc des Sports Aguiléra, Biarritz
Referee: Joy Neville (Ireland)

16 June 2019
11:44

Canada	12–5	France
Try: Crossley 3'm Farella 5'c Con: Landry (1/2) 5'	Report	Try: Grassineau 13'

Parc des Sports Aguiléra, Biarritz
Referee: Sara Cox (England)

16 June 2019
12:06

New Zealand	36–0	China
Try: Blyde (3) 0'c, 3'c, 8'c Saili 5'm Te Temaki 12'm Tui 13'm Con: Nathan-Wong (3/6) 1', 3', 8'	Report

Parc des Sports Aguiléra, Biarritz
Referee: Emily Hsieh (United States)

Semifinals

16 June 2019
14:51

Spain	7–24	United States
Try: Plà 0'c Con: García (1/1) 1'	Report	Try: Tapper (2) 2'm, 12'c Doyle 6'c Kelter 7'm Con: Kelter (1/2) 7'; Heavirland (1/1) 12'; Canett (0/1)

Parc des Sports Aguiléra, Biarritz
Referee: Sara Cox (England)

16 June 2019
15:13

Canada	12–21	New Zealand
Try: Paquin 6'c Williams 13'm Con: Landry (1/1) 6'; Benn (0/1)	Report	Try: Saili 1'c Nathan-Wong 3'c Tui 8'c Con: Nathan-Wong (3/3) 1', 3', 9'

Parc des Sports Aguiléra, Biarritz
Referee: Hollie Davidson (Scotland)

Third Place

16 June 2019
17:35

Spain	14–19	Canada
Try: Losada 7'c Martínez 8'c Con: García (2/2) 7', 9'	Report	Try: Farella 2'm Benn 4'c Williams 12'c Con: Nicholas (2/3) 5', 12'

Parc des Sports Aguiléra, Biarritz
Referee: Emily Hsieh (United States)

Final

16 June 2019
18:00

United States	26–10	New Zealand
Try: Kelter (2) 0'm, 7'c Emba 3'c Doyle 11'c Con: Kelter (2/3) 4', 7'; Heavirland (1/1) 11'	Report	Try: Tui 5'm Baker 12'm Con: Nathan-Wong (0/2)

Parc des Sports Aguiléra, Biarritz
Referee: Hollie Davidson (Scotland)

== Tournament placings ==
Place	Team	Points
1st place, gold medalist(s)	United States	20
2nd place, silver medalist(s)	New Zealand	18
3rd place, bronze medalist(s)	Canada	16
4	Spain	14
5	Australia	12
6	France	10
7	China	8
8	Russia	6
9	Fiji	4
10	England	3
11	Scotland	2
12	Ireland	1

Source: World Rugby

== Players ==
=== Scoring leaders ===
Tries scored
Rank	Player	Tries
1	Alena Saili	6
1	Bianca Farella	6
1	Charlotte Caslick	6
1	Emma Tonegato	6
1	Michaela Blyde	6
1	Rhona Lloyd	6

Points scored
Rank	Player	Points
1	Tyla Nathan-Wong	34
2	Alena Saili	30
2	Bianca Farella	30
2	Charlotte Caslick	30
2	Emma Tonegato	30
2	Michaela Blyde	30
2	Rhona Lloyd	30

Source: World Rugby

== See also ==
- 2019 Paris Sevens (for men)
- World Rugby Women's Sevens Series
- 2018–19 World Rugby Women's Sevens Series

Women's Sevens Series VII
Preceded by 2019 Canada Women's Sevens	2019 France Women's Sevens	Succeeded by None (last event)
France Women's Sevens
Preceded by 2018 France Women's Sevens	2019 France Women's Sevens	Succeeded by 2020 France Women's Sevens
