= 2018 USA Women's Sevens =

- Women's Sevens Series VII
- Host nation: United States
- Date: 20–21 October 2018

Cup
- Champion: New Zealand
- Runner-up: United States
- Third: Canada

Challenge
- Winner: Spain

Tournament details
- Matches played: 34
- Tries scored: 218 (average 6.41 per match)
- Most points: Portia Woodman (50)
- Most tries: Portia Woodman (10)

The 2018 USA Women's Sevens was the first tournament of the 2018–19 World Rugby Women's Sevens Series. It was played on 20–21 October 2018 at Infinity Park in Glendale, Colorado, the first time the USA Women's Sevens was held at the venue.

== Format ==
The teams were drawn into three pools of four teams each. Each team played every other team in their pool once. The top two teams from each pool advanced to the Cup/Plate brackets while the top 2 third place teams also competed in the Cup/Plate. The other teams from each group played-off for the Challenge Trophy.

== Teams ==
Eleven core teams participated in the tournament along with one invited team, Mexico:

- Australia
- Canada
- China
- England
- Fiji
- France
- Ireland
- Mexico
- New Zealand
- Russia
- Spain
- United States

== Pool stage ==
All times in Mountain Daylight Time (UTC−06:00)

Key to colours in group tables
Teams that advanced to the Cup Quarterfinal

=== Pool A ===
Team	Pld	W	D	L	PF	PA	PD	Pts
Australia	3	3	0	0	114	15	+99	9
Russia	3	2	0	1	107	26	+81	7
Spain	3	1	0	2	51	74	−23	5
Mexico	3	0	0	3	0	157	−157	3

20 October 2018
11:58

Russia	34–5	Spain

Infinity Park, Glendale
Referee: Sara Cox (England)

20 October 2018
12:20

Australia	53–0	Mexico

Infinity Park, Glendale
Referee: Emily Hsieh (United States)

20 October 2018
14:42

Russia	58–0	Mexico

Infinity Park, Glendale
Referee: Sakurako Kawasaki (Japan)

20 October 2018
15:04

Australia	40–0	Spain

Infinity Park, Glendale
Referee: Tevita Rokovereni (Fiji)

20 October 2018
17:26

Spain	46–0	Mexico

Infinity Park, Glendale
Referee: Sakurako Kawasaki (Japan)

20 October 2018
17:48

Australia	21–15	Russia

Infinity Park, Glendale
Referee: Joy Neville (Ireland)

=== Pool B ===
Team	Pld	W	D	L	PF	PA	PD	Pts
New Zealand	3	3	0	0	108	19	+89	9
England	3	2	0	1	54	50	+4	7
United States	3	1	0	2	46	68	−22	5
China	3	0	0	3	33	104	−71	3

20 October 2018
11:14

United States	10–12	England

Infinity Park, Glendale
Referee: Hollie Davidson (Scotland)

20 October 2018
11:36

New Zealand	45–0	China

Infinity Park, Glendale
Referee: Tyler Miller (Australia)

20 October 2018
13:58

United States	24–21	China

Infinity Park, Glendale
Referee: Beatrice Benvenuti (Italy)

20 October 2018
14:20

New Zealand	28–7	England

Infinity Park, Glendale
Referee: Joy Neville (Ireland)

20 October 2018
16:42

England	35–12	China

Infinity Park, Glendale
Referee: Emily Hsieh (United States)

20 October 2018
17:04

New Zealand	35–12	United States

Infinity Park, Glendale
Referee: Sara Cox (England)

=== Pool C ===
Team	Pld	W	D	L	PF	PA	PD	Pts
Canada	3	3	0	0	74	29	+45	9
France	3	2	0	1	76	48	+28	7
Ireland	3	1	0	2	83	52	+31	5
Fiji	3	0	0	3	26	130	−104	3

20 October 2018
10:30

Canada	26–7	Fiji

Infinity Park, Glendale
Referee: Joy Neville (Ireland)

20 October 2018
10:52

France	21–12	Ireland

Infinity Park, Glendale
Referee: Tevita Rokovereni (Fiji)

20 October 2018
13:14

Canada	24–12	Ireland

Infinity Park, Glendale
Referee: Sakurako Kawasaki Japan

20 October 2018
13:36

France	45–12	Fiji

Infinity Park, Glendale
Referee: Sara Cox (England)

20 October 2018
15:58

Fiji	7–59	Ireland

Infinity Park, Glendale
Referee: Beatrice Benvenuti (Italy)

20 October 2018
16:20

France	10–24	Canada

Infinity Park, Glendale
Referee: Hollie Davidson (Scotland)

== Knockout stage ==
=== Challenge Trophy ===
Semi-finals
21 October 2018 – 11:58 – Infinity Park
Spain	46
Mexico	0
21 October 2018 – 12:20 – Infinity Park
China	14
Fiji	17

Challenge Trophy Final
21 October 2018 – 15:26 – Infinity Park
Spain	20
Fiji	14
Eleventh place
21 October 2018 – 15:04 – Infinity Park
Mexico	0
China	47

Matches

Semi-finals

21 October 2018
11:58

Spain	46–0	Mexico

Infinity Park, Glendale

21 October 2018
12:20

China	14–17	Fiji

Infinity Park, Glendale

Eleventh place

21 October 2018
15:04

Mexico	0–47	China

Infinity Park, Glendale

Challenge Trophy Final

21 October 2018
15:26

Spain	20–4	Fiji

Infinity Park, Glendale

=== Fifth place ===
Semi-finals
21 October 2018 – 13:36 – Infinity Park
Ireland	21
Russia	10
21 October 2018 – 13:58 – Infinity Park
England	12
Australia	26

Fifth place
21 October 2018 – 16:42 – Infinity Park
Ireland	19
Australia	21
Seventh place
21 October 2018 – 16:20 – Infinity Park
Russia	17
England	14

Matches

Semi-finals

21 October 2018
13:36

Ireland	21–0	Russia

Infinity Park, Glendale

21 October 2018
13:58

England	12–26	Australia

Infinity Park, Glendale

Seventh place

21 October 2018
16:20

Russia	17–14	England

Infinity Park, Glendale

Fifth place

21 October 2018
16:42

Ireland	19–21	Australia

Infinity Park, Glendale

=== Cup ===
Quarter-finals
21 October 2018 – 10:30 – Infinity Park
New Zealand	34
Ireland	7
21 October 2018 – 10:52 – Infinity Park
Canada	21
Russia	17
21 October 2018 – 11:14 – Infinity Park
England	7
France	22
21 October 2018 – 11:36 – Infinity Park
Australia	5
United States	26

Semi-finals
21 October 2018 – 14:20 – Infinity Park
New Zealand	28
Canada	19
21 October 2018 – 14:42 – Infinity Park
France	19
United States	21

Cup Final
21 October 2018 – 17:30 – Infinity Park
New Zealand	33
United States	7
Bronze Final
21 October 2018 – 17:04 – Infinity Park
Canada	28
France	0

Matches

Quarter-finals

21 October 2018
10:30

New Zealand	34–7	Ireland

Infinity Park, Glendale

21 October 2018
10:52

Canada	21–17	Russia

Infinity Park, Glendale

21 October 2018
11:14

England	7–22	France

Infinity Park, Glendale

21 October 2018
11:36

Australia	5–26	United States

Infinity Park, Glendale

Semi-finals

21 October 2018
14:20

New Zealand	28–19	Canada

Infinity Park, Glendale

21 October 2018
14:42

France	19–21	United States

Infinity Park, Glendale

Bronze Final

21 October 2018
17:04

Canada	28–0	France

Infinity Park, Glendale

Cup Final

21 October 2018
17:30

New Zealand	33–7	United States

Infinity Park, Glendale

== Tournament placings ==
Place	Team	Points
1st place, gold medalist(s)	New Zealand	20
2nd place, silver medalist(s)	United States	18
3rd place, bronze medalist(s)	Canada	16
4	France	14
5	Australia	12
6	Ireland	10

Place	Team	Points
7	Russia	8
8	England	6
9	Spain	4
10	Fiji	3
11	China	2
12	Mexico	1

Source: World Rugby

== Players ==
=== Scoring leaders ===
Tries scored
Rank	Player	Tries
1	Portia Woodman	10
2	Ilona Maher	7
2	Kristina Seredina	7
4	Alena Mikhaltsova	6
4	Michaela Blyde	6

Points scored
Rank	Player	Points
1	Portia Woodman	50
2	Emma Sykes (rugby union)	45
3	Ghislaine Landry	43
4	Tyla Nathan-Wong	42
5	Lucy Mulhall	38

Source: World Rugby

== See also ==
- World Rugby Women's Sevens Series
- 2018–19 World Rugby Women's Sevens Series
- World Rugby
