= Rejieli Uluinayau =

Fiji international rugby union player

- Born: 1993 (age 32–33) Suva, Fiji

Rugby union career
- Position(s): Wing, Fullback, Halfback
Provincial / State sides
Years	Team	Apps	(Points)
2011–2020	Wellington Pride	25	(15)
Super Rugby
Years	Team	Apps	(Points)
2022	Fijiana Drua	6	(0)
International career
Years	Team	Apps	(Points)
2016–Present	Fiji		(0)
National sevens team
Years	Team		Comps
2021	Fiji		

Rejieli Sau Uluinayau is a Fijian rugby union and sevens player.

== Early life ==
Uluinayau was born and grew up in Vatuwaqa, Suva where she attended Stella Maris Primary School. She hails from Salia, Nayau, Lau and shares maternal links to Nukui, Rewa. She later migrated with her family to New Zealand at the age of 13 and attended Wellington East Girls' College.

== Rugby career ==
Uluinayau made her international debut for Fiji against Papua New Guinea at the 2016 Oceania Championship. In December, she made an appearance for the Fijiana's again at the 2017 World Cup Repechage tournament against Japan and Hong Kong.

In 2011, Uluinayau scored one of nine unanswered tries for Wellington in the season opener against Otago Spirit in the Farah Palmer Cup. She was part of a 14-member squad that played for the Eketahuna Club, they represented Wairarapa-Bush at the Bay of Plenty Interprovincial Sevens tournament at Mount Maunganui.

Uluinayau scored a brace of tries for Wellington Pride in the opening round of the 2017 Farah Palmer Cup. She later featured for the Wellington sevens team at the Central Region Qualifying tournament for the 2018 Sevens Nationals. In 2018, She played for the Wellington Pride in their Farah Palmer Cup Championship semi-final against the North Harbour Hibiscus.

Uluinayau made seven appearances for Wellington in 2019, she featured in their Premiership Semifinal against Auckland Storm. She made three appearances in 2020, she played against Otago Spirit in round seven.

Uluinayau has also represented Fiji in sevens. She was chosen for the Fijiana sevens team for the 2021 Oceania Sevens Championship. She was initially named as a traveling reserve for the Tokyo Olympics but was ruled out due to injury.

Uluinayau was selected for the Fijiana Drua squad in their Super W debut. She was named on the bench in the Drua's inaugural match against the Rebels. She made the starting line up in the matches against the Reds and Western Force. She also played in the games against the Waratahs and the Brumbies. She then featured in the Grand Final against the Waratahs as the Drua wrapped up a perfect season with their first title.

Uluinayau was named in the Fijiana squad for two test matches against Australia and Japan in May. She came off the bench in the first test against Japan. She was in the starting line up in the test against Australia.
