= 2018–19 World Rugby Women's Sevens Series =

Seventh edition of the global circuit for women's national rugby sevens teams

World Rugby Women's Sevens Series VII
- Hosts: United States; United Arab Emirates; Australia; Japan; Canada; France
- Date: 20 October 2018 – 16 June 2019
- Nations: 16

Final positions
- Champions: New Zealand
- Runners-up: United States
- Third: Canada

The 2018–19 World Rugby Women's Sevens Series was the seventh edition of the global circuit for women's national rugby sevens teams, organised by World Rugby. Six tournament events were scheduled on the 2018–19 circuit with twelve teams competing in each tournament. The series also, for the second time, doubled as an Olympic qualifier.

The series was won by New Zealand who won four tour events on their way to claiming their fifth World Series title.

== Format ==
Twelve teams compete at each event. The top-ranked teams at each tournament play off for a Cup, with gold, silver and bronze medals also awarded to the first three teams. Lower-ranked teams at each tournament play off for a Challenge Trophy. The overall winner of the series was determined by points gained from the standings across all events in the season.

== Teams ==
The "core teams" qualified to participate in all series events for the 2018–19 series were:

- Australia
- Canada
- England
- Fiji
- France
- Ireland
- New Zealand
- Russia
- Spain
- United States

One additional core team qualified through winning the 2018 Hong Kong Women's Sevens:

- China

The twelfth team in each tournament is allocated based on performance in the respective continental competitions within Africa, Asia, Europe, Oceania, and the Americas.

== Tour venues ==
There were six tournaments in 2018–19:

2018–19 Itinerary
Leg	Stadium	City	Dates	Winner
United States	Infinity Park	Glendale (Denver)	20–21 October 2018	New Zealand
Dubai	The Sevens	Dubai	29–30 November 2018	New Zealand
Australia	Spotless Stadium	Sydney	1–3 February 2019	New Zealand
Japan	Mikuni World Stadium	Kitakyushu	20–21 April 2019	Canada
Canada	Westhills Stadium	Langford (Victoria)	11–12 May 2019	New Zealand
France	Parc des Sports Aguiléra	Biarritz	15–16 June 2019	United States

== Standings ==
Final standings for the 2018–19 series:

2018–19 World Rugby Women's – Series VII
Pos.	Event Team	Glendale	Dubai	Sydney	Kitakyushu	Langford	Biarritz	Points total	Points difference
1	New Zealand	20	20	20	12	20	18	110	673
2	United States	18	14	16	16	16	20	100	225
3	Canada	16	18	12	20	12	16	94	300
4	Australia	12	16	18	10	18	12	86	390
5	France	14	8	10	14	14	10	70	163
6	England (Note: By agreement between the three unions on the island of Great Britain (England, Scotland, Wales), England represented Great Britain in qualifying for the 2020 Olympic Sevens. The final make-up of the Great Britain women's team was determined by the British Olympic Association.)	6	10	3	18	10	3	50	67
7	Russia	8	12	8	6	8	6	48	–76
8	Ireland	10	6	14	8	2	1	41	–96
9	Spain	4	3	6	3	6	14	36	–241
10	Fiji	3	2	4	4	4	4	21	–162
11	China	2	4	2	2	3	8	21	–407
12	Scotland	–	–	–	–	–	2	2	–62
13	Japan	–	–	–	1	–	–	1	–82
14	Kenya	–	1	–	–	–	–	1	–92
15	Brazil	–	–	–	–	1	–	1	–148
16	Papua New Guinea	–	–	1	–	–	–	1	–202
17	Mexico	1	–	–	–	–	–	1	–250

Source: World Rugby

Event medalists
Gold	Event Champions
Silver	Event Runner-ups
Bronze	Event Third place finishers
Qualification for the 2019–20 World Rugby Women's Sevens Series
No colour	Core team in 2018–19 and re-qualified as a core team for the 2019–20
Pink	Relegated as the lowest placed core team at the end of the 2018–19 series
Yellow	Invitational team
Qualification for the 2020 Olympic Sevens
Automatically qualified (host country Japan)
Qualified to the 2020 Olympic Sevens as one of the four highest placed eligible teams from the 2018–19 series.

== Placings summary ==
Tallies of top four tournament placings during the 2018–19 series, by team:

Team	(gold) Gold	(silver) Silver	(bronze) Bronze	Fourth	Total
United States	1	1	3	1	6
New Zealand	4	1	–	–	5
Canada	1	1	2	–	4
Australia	–	2	1	–	3
France	–	–	–	3	3
England	–	1	–	–	1
Ireland	–	–	–	1	1
Spain	–	–	–	1	1
Totals	6	6	6	6	24

== Tournaments ==
=== Glendale ===
Event	Winners	Score	Finalists	Semifinalists
Cup	New Zealand	33–7	United States	Canada (Bronze); France
5th Place	Australia	21–19	Ireland	Russia (7th); England
Challenge Trophy	Spain	20–14	Fiji	China (11th); Mexico

=== Dubai ===
Event	Winners	Score	Finalists	Semifinalists
Cup	New Zealand	26–14	Canada	Australia (Bronze); United States
5th Place	Russia	12–7	England	France (7th); Ireland
Challenge Trophy	China	12–7	Spain	Fiji (11th); Kenya

=== Sydney ===
Event	Winners	Score	Finalists	Semifinalists
Cup	New Zealand	34–10	Australia	United States (Bronze); Ireland
5th Place	Canada	19–17	France	Russia (7th); Spain
Challenge Trophy	Fiji	15–12	England	China (11th); Papua New Guinea

=== Kitakyushu ===
Event	Winners	Score	Finalists	Semifinalists
Cup	Canada	7–5	England	United States (Bronze); France
5th Place	New Zealand	34–26	Australia	Ireland (7th); Russia
Challenge Trophy	Fiji	41–12	Spain	China (11th); Japan

=== Langford ===
Event	Winners	Score	Finalists	Semifinalists
Cup	New Zealand	21-17	Australia	United States (bronze); France
5th Place	Canada	31-7	England	Russia (7th); Spain
Challenge Trophy	Fiji	26-19	China	Ireland (11th); Brazil

=== Biarritz ===
Event	Winners	Score	Finalists	Semifinalists
Cup	United States	26-10	New Zealand	Canada (bronze); Spain
5th Place	Australia	24-10	France	China (7th); Russia
Challenge Trophy	Fiji	27-10	England	Scotland (11th); Ireland

== Players ==
=== Scoring leaders ===
Tries scored
Rank	Player	Tries
1	Amee-Leigh Murphy-Crowe	35
2	Bianca Farella	34
3	Michaela Blyde	30
4	Ellia Green	27
5	Anne-Cécile Ciofani	21

Points scored
Rank	Player	Points
1	Tyla Nathan-Wong	207
2	Ghislaine Landry	202
3	Amee-Leigh Murphy-Crowe	175
4	Bianca Farella	170
5	Michaela Blyde	150

Updated: 16 June 2019

=== Awards ===
Impact player awards
Tour Leg	Player	Points
Glendale	Alena Mikhaltsova	57
Dubai	Evania Pelite	53
Sydney	Michaela Blyde	57
Kitakyushu	Charlotte Caslick	66
Langford	Brittany Benn	48
Paris	Hannah Smith	52

Total impact player points
Pos	Player	T	B	O	C	Total
1	Alena Mikhaltsova	74	32	26	127	259
2	Sarah Hirini	79	21	23	116	239
2	Amee-Leigh Murphy-Crowe	60	37	17	125	239
4	Charlotte Caslick	74	22	6	132	234
5	Eve Higgins	52	21	11	144	228
5	Baizat Khamidova	69	21	16	112	228
7	Brittany Benn	79	12	16	118	225
8	Shannon Izar	58	14	23	114	209
9	Bianca Farella	61	31	8	108	208
10	Michaela Blyde	38	28	24	111	201

Updated: 16 June 2019

== See also ==
- 2018–19 World Rugby Sevens Series (for men)
- 2019 Hong Kong Women's Sevens
- Rugby sevens at the 2020 Summer Olympics – Women's qualification
