= Kasey McCravey =

American rugby player (born 1994)

- Born: March 1, 1994 (age 32)
- Education: Desert Mountain High School
- Alma mater: United States Military Academy
- Height: 170 cm (5 ft 7 in)
- Weight: 63 kg (139 lb)

Rugby union career
- Position: Fly Half (7s)
International career
Years	Team	Apps	(Points)
2019-	United States		

Kasey McCravey (born March 1, 1994) is an American rugby player. She debuted for the United States at the 2019 Sydney Sevens.

McCravey began playing rugby after attending West Point, where she played softball.

== Personal life ==
McCravey attended Desert Mountain High School in Scottsdale, Arizona; she graduated in 2012. At West Point, she majored in Kinesiology. She is currently a Captain in the US Army and participates in the Army's World Class Athlete Program.
