= Litiana Lawedrau =

- Born: 9 October 1992 (age 34)
- Height: 1.67 m (5 ft 6 in)
- Weight: 71 kg (157 lb)

Rugby union career
- Position: Centre
Senior career
Years	Team	Apps	(Points)
2022	Fijiana Drua	1	(0)
International career
Years	Team	Apps	(Points)
2016–	Fiji	2	(0)
National sevens team
Years	Team		Comps
- Fiji

Litiana Lawedrau (born 9 October 1992) is a Fijian rugby union player.

Lawedrau made her Fijiana XV's debut against Papua New Guinea at the 2016 Oceania Championship on the 5th of November in Suva, Fiji. She scored the first try in the 19th minute of the first half. She later played in the repechage match against Hong Kong to qualify for the 2017 Rugby World Cup.

In 2022, Lawedrau was named in the Fijiana Drua squad for Super W. She made the starting line-up for the Drua's debut in the competition, they played against the Melbourne Rebels. She was later dropped from the squad entirely for breaching camp rules.
