= 2018 Dubai Women's Sevens =

Women's rugby sevens tournament

- Women's Sevens Series VII
- Host nation: United Arab Emirates
- Date: 29–30 November 2018

Cup
- Champion: New Zealand
- Runner-up: Canada
- Third: Australia

Challenge
- Winner: China

Tournament details
- Matches played: 34
- Tries scored: 182 (average 5.35 per match)
- Most points: Bianca Farella (35); Michaela Blyde (35)
- Most tries: Bianca Farella (7); Michaela Blyde (7)

The 2018 Dubai Women's Sevens was the second tournament within the 2018–19 World Rugby Women's Sevens Series. It was held on 29–30 November 2018 at The Sevens Stadium in Dubai, United Arab Emirates.

== Format ==
The teams are drawn into three pools of four teams each. Each team plays every other team in their pool once. The top two teams from each pool advance to the Cup/Plate brackets while the top 2 third place teams also compete in the Cup/Plate. The other teams from each group play-off for the Challenge Trophy.

== Teams ==
Eleven core teams are participating in the tournament along with one invited team, 2018 Africa Women's Sevens winners Kenya:

- Australia
- Canada
- China
- England
- Fiji
- France
- Ireland
- Kenya
- New Zealand
- Russia
- Spain
- United States

== Pool stage ==
All times in UAE Standard Time (UTC+4:00)

Key to colours in group tables
Teams that advanced to the Cup Quarterfinal

=== Pool A ===
Team	Pld	W	D	L	PF	PA	PD	Pts
New Zealand	3	3	0	0	87	36	+51	9
Ireland	3	2	0	1	70	36	+34	7
Russia	3	1	0	2	31	55	−24	5
Kenya	3	0	0	3	19	80	−61	3

29 November 2018
13:28

Ireland	26–0	Russia

The Sevens, Dubai

29 November 2018
13:50

New Zealand	34–7	Kenya

The Sevens, Dubai

29 November 2018
16:24

Ireland	27–12	Kenya

The Sevens, Dubai

29 November 2018
16:46

New Zealand	29–12	Russia

The Sevens, Dubai

29 November 2018
19:21

Russia	19–0	Kenya

The Sevens, Dubai

29 November 2018
19:43

New Zealand	24–17	Ireland

The Sevens, Dubai

=== Pool B ===
Team	Pld	W	D	L	PF	PA	PD	Pts
England	3	3	0	0	78	24	+54	9
United States	3	2	0	1	65	31	+34	7
Australia	3	1	0	2	62	53	+9	5
China	3	0	0	3	5	102	−97	3

29 November 2018
12:44

Australia	12–26	England

The Sevens, Dubai

29 November 2018
13:06

United States	31–0	China

The Sevens, Dubai

29 November 2018
15:40

Australia	33–5	China

The Sevens, Dubai

29 November 2018
16:02

United States	12–14	England

The Sevens, Dubai

29 November 2018
18:37

England	38–0	China

The Sevens, Dubai

29 November 2018
18:59

United States	22–17	Australia

The Sevens, Dubai

=== Pool C ===
Team	Pld	W	D	L	PF	PA	PD	Pts
Canada	3	3	0	0	88	28	+60	9
France	3	2	0	1	77	36	+41	7
Fiji	3	1	0	2	39	77	−38	5
Spain	3	0	0	3	12	75	−63	3

29 November 2018
12:00

France	29–0	Spain

The Sevens, Dubai

29 November 2018
12:22

Canada	38–7	Fiji

The Sevens, Dubai

29 November 2018
14:56

France	34–15	Fiji

The Sevens, Dubai

29 November 2018
15:18

Canada	29–7	Spain

The Sevens, Dubai

29 November 2018
17:53

Spain	5–17	Fiji

The Sevens, Dubai

29 November 2018
18:15

Canada	21–14	France

The Sevens, Dubai

== Knockout stage ==
=== Challenge Trophy ===
Semi-finals
30 November 2018 – 10:28 – The Sevens
Fiji	10
China	12
30 November 2018 – 10:50 – The Sevens
Kenya	7
Spain	24

Challenge Trophy Final
30 November 2018 – 16:24 – The Sevens
China	12
Spain	7
Eleventh place
30 November 2018 – 14:40 – The Sevens
Fiji	17
Kenya	5

Matches

Semi-finals

30 November 2018
10:28

Fiji	10–12	China

The Sevens, Dubai

30 November 2018
10:50

Kenya	7–24	Spain

The Sevens, Dubai

Eleventh place

30 November 2018
14:40

Fiji	17–5	Kenya

The Sevens, Dubai

Challenge Trophy Final

30 November 2018
16:24

China	12–7	Spain

The Sevens, Dubai

=== Fifth place ===
Semi-finals
30 November 2018 – 12:14 – The Sevens
Russia	21
France	10
30 November 2018 – 12:36 – The Sevens
Ireland	17
England	22

Fifth place
30 November 2018 – 15:24 – The Sevens
Russia	12
England	7
Seventh place
30 November 2018 – 15:02 – The Sevens
France	17
Ireland	5

Matches

Semi-finals

30 November 2018
12:14

Russia	21–10	France

The Sevens, Dubai

30 November 2018
12:36

Ireland	17–22	England

The Sevens, Dubai

Seventh place

30 November 2018
15:02

France	12–7	Ireland

The Sevens, Dubai

Fifth place

30 November 2018
15:24

Russia	17–5	England

The Sevens, Dubai

=== Cup ===
Quarter-finals
30 November 2018 – 9:00 – The Sevens
New Zealand	31
Russia	0
30 November 2018 – 9:22 – The Sevens
United States	12
France	10
30 November 2018 – 9:44 – The Sevens
Canada	24
Ireland	7
30 November 2018 – 10:06 – The Sevens
England	12
Australia	27

Semi-finals
30 November 2018 – 13:28 – The Sevens
New Zealand	22
United States	0
30 November 2018 – 13:50 – The Sevens
Canada	15
Australia	10

Cup Final
30 November 2018 – 17:15 – The Sevens
New Zealand	26
Canada	14
Third place
30 November 2018 – 16:49 – The Sevens
United States	21
Australia	26

Matches

Quarter-finals

30 November 2018
9:00

New Zealand	31–0	Russia

The Sevens, Dubai

30 November 2018
9:22

United States	12–10	France

The Sevens, Dubai

30 November 2018
9:44

Canada	24–7	Ireland

The Sevens, Dubai

30 November 2018
10:06

England	12–27	Australia

The Sevens, Dubai

Semi-finals

30 November 2018
13:28

New Zealand	22–0	United States

The Sevens, Dubai

30 November 2018
13:50

Australia	10–15	Canada

The Sevens, Dubai

3rd place

30 November 2018
16:49

United States	21–26	Australia

The Sevens, Dubai

Cup Final

30 November 2018
17:15

New Zealand	26–14	Canada

The Sevens, Dubai

== Tournament placings ==
Place	Team	Points
1st place, gold medalist(s)	New Zealand	20
2nd place, silver medalist(s)	Canada	18
3rd place, bronze medalist(s)	Australia	16
4	United States	14
5	Russia	12
6	England	10

Place	Team	Points
7	France	8
8	Ireland	6
9	China	4
10	Spain	3
11	Fiji	2
12	Kenya	1

Source: World Rugby

== Players ==
=== Scoring leaders ===
Tries scored
Rank	Player	Tries
1	Bianca Farella	7
1	Michaela Blyde	7
3	Amee-Leigh Murphy-Crowe	6
4	Evania Pelite	5
4	Gayle Broughton	5

Points scored
Rank	Player	Points
1	Bianca Farella	35
1	Michaela Blyde	35
3	Ghislaine Landry	30
3	Amee-Leigh Murphy-Crowe	30
5	Tyla Nathan-Wong	28

Source: World Rugby

== See also ==
- World Rugby Women's Sevens Series
- 2018–19 World Rugby Women's Sevens Series
- World Rugby
