= Marina Kukina =

Russian rugby sevens player

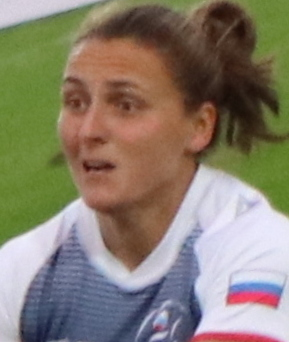
- Full name: Marina Vladimirovna Kukina
- Born: 22 August 1993 (age 33) Lipetsk, Russia
- Height: 1.73 m (5 ft 8 in)
- Weight: 67 kg (148 lb)

Rugby union career
National sevens team
Years	Team	Comps
2014–Present	Russia	103 (84 pts)

Marina Vladimirovna Kukina (Russian: Марина Владимировна Кукина; born 22 August 1993) is a Russian rugby sevens player. She competed in the women's tournament at the 2020 Summer Olympics.
