= Julia Greenshields =

Canadian rugby sevens player

Julia Greenshields OLY
Personal information
- Born: February 12, 1992 (age 34) Sarnia, Ontario, Canada
- Height: 165 cm (5 ft 5 in)
- Weight: 62 kg (137 lb)

Sport
- Country: Canada
- Sport: Rugby sevens

Julia Greenshields OLY (born February 12, 1992) is a Canadian rugby union player, in the sevens discipline.

== Career ==
Greenshields was part of Canada's 2018 Commonwealth Games team that finished in fourth place.

In June 2021, Greenshields was chosen as part of Canada's 2020 Olympic team.
