= Daria Shestakova =

Russian rugby sevens player

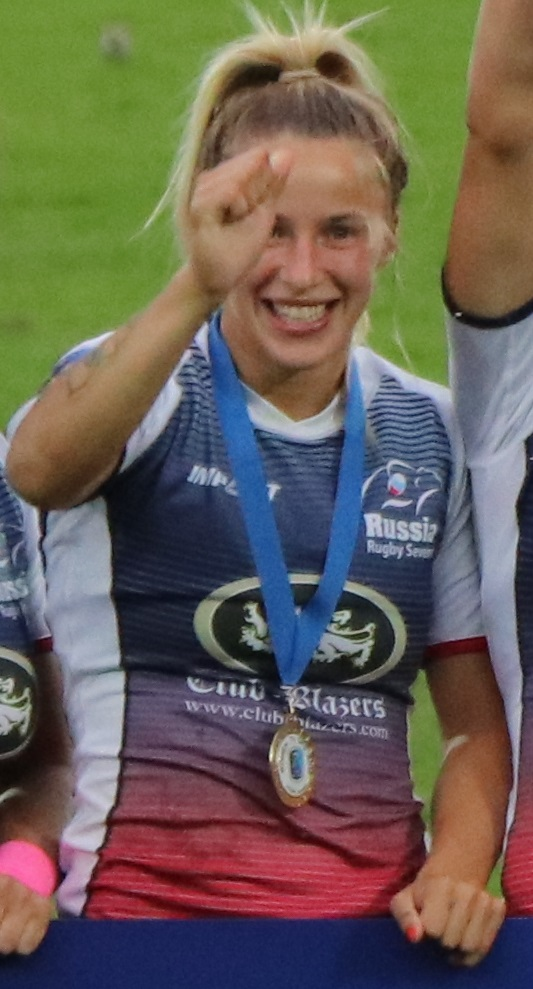
- Shestakova at the 2018 Kazan Sevens winners ceremony
- Full name: Daria Stanislavovna Shestakova
- Born: 6 February 1996 (age 30) Uzhhorod, Ukraine

Rugby union career
International career
Years	Team	Apps	(Points)
2015–Present	Russia		
National sevens team
Years	Team		Comps
2016–Present	Russia		69 (110 pts)

Daria Stanislavovna Shestakova (Russian: Дарья Станиславовна Шестакова; born 6 February 1996) is a Russian rugby sevens player. She competed in the women's tournament at the 2020 Summer Olympics.
