= Elisabet Martínez =

Spanish rugby player

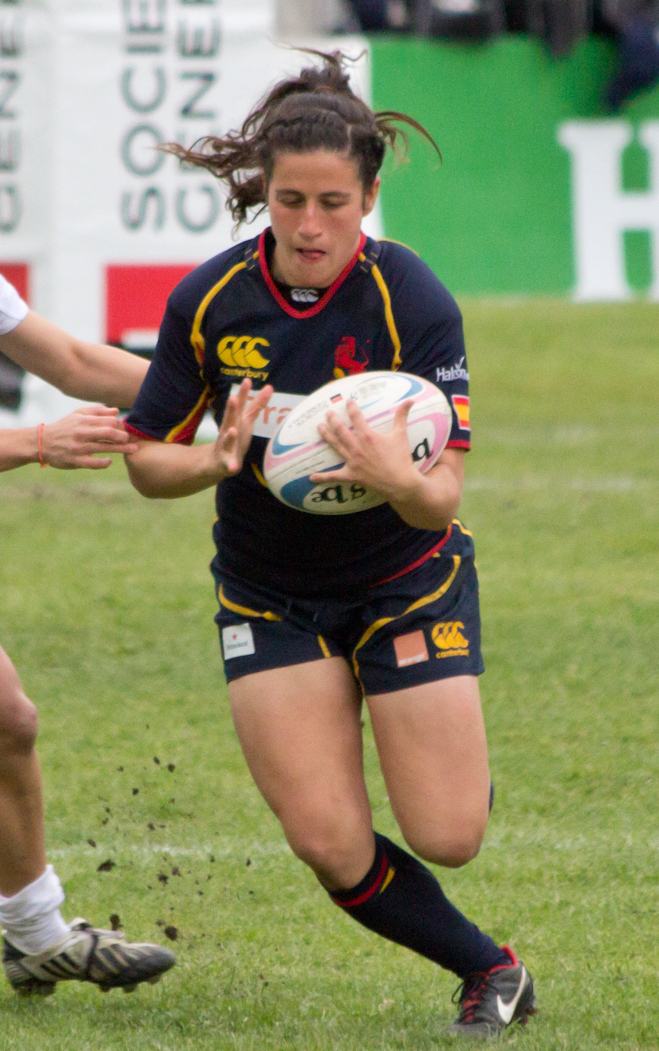
- Martínez in 2013
- Born: 13 June 1988 (age 38)
- Height: 167 cm (5 ft 6 in)
- Weight: 73 kg (161 lb; 11 st 7 lb)

Rugby union career
- Position: Winger
International career
Years	Team	Apps	(Points)
- Spain
National sevens team
Years	Team		Comps
- Spain 7s

Elisabet Martínez (born 13 June 1988) is a Spanish rugby sevens player. She is a member of Spain's women's national rugby sevens team to the 2016 Summer Olympics. She captained her squad at the last Olympic qualification tournament for Rio 2016 when they defeated Russia 19-12 in the finals.
