= Elena Zdrokova =

Russian rugby sevens player

- Full name: Elena Vladimirovna Zdrokova
- Born: 26 December 1996 (age 29) Novosibirsk, Russia
- Height: 1.75 m (5 ft 9 in)
- Weight: 64 kg (141 lb)

Rugby union career
National sevens team
Years	Team	Comps
2016–Present	Russia	113 (434 pts)

Elena Vladimirovna Zdrokova (Russian: Елена Владимировна Здрокова; born 26 December 1996) is a Russian rugby sevens player. She competed in the women's tournament at the 2020 Summer Olympics.
