= Hollie Davidson =

Scottish rugby union player and referee

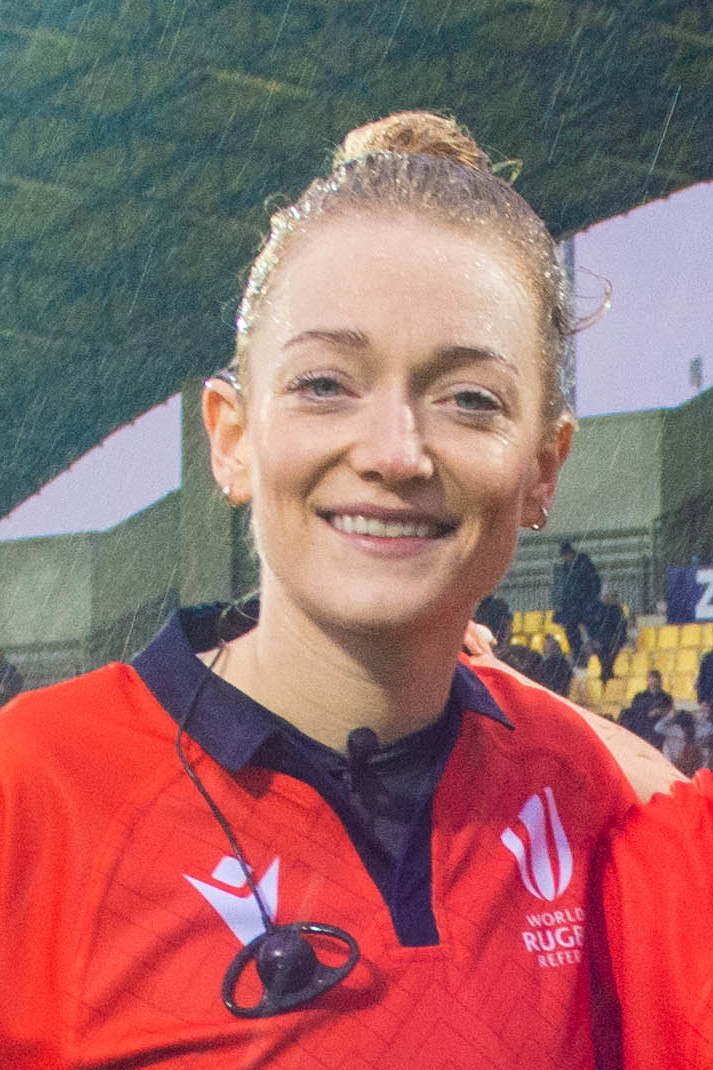
- Davidson in 2023
- Born: 19 September 1992 (age 34) Aboyne, Scotland
- Height: 1.65 m (5 ft 5 in)
- School: Aboyne Academy
- University: University of Edinburgh
- Occupation: Rugby union referee

Rugby union career
- Position: Scrum half
Amateur team(s)
Years	Team	Apps	(Points)
-	Murrayfield Wanderers		
–	Edinburgh University RFC		
International career
Years	Team	Apps	(Points)
2010-12	Scotland U20s		
Refereeing career
Years	Competition		Apps
2017-	Women's Sevens Series		
2018-	Rugby Europe		
2018	Commonwealth Games		
2018	Rugby World Cup Sevens		
2019-	Women's Six Nations		
2019-	Super 6		
2021	Pro14		
2021-	URC		
2022	1872 Cup		
2026-	Top 14		
2026-	Six Nations Championship		
2026-	Nations Championship		

Hollie Davidson (born 19 September 1992) is a Scottish professional rugby union referee who is contracted with the Scottish Rugby Union. She was given a Scotland referee cap in February 2025.

== Playing career ==
Davidson began playing competitive rugby when she was 14. At Edinburgh University she played for the women's rugby side, winning the BUCS rugby championship.

She played at scrum-half for Murrayfield Wanderers and the Scotland under-20s from 2010-12. One week before she was due to receive a senior cap with Scotland she dislocated her shoulder, ending her playing career.

== Referee career ==
=== Professional career ===
In 2015 Davidson joined the SRU's refereeing course, when a new course was held on Saturdays. Prior to this time the refereeing courses were held on Sunday, the same day as women's professional rugby matches, thus making it impossible for women to train as referees. Davidson became Scottish Rugby Union's first full time professional women's referee in 2017. In 2018, Davidson was assistant referee for the Glasgow Warriors v Zebre match in the Pro14.

In 2019 Davidson became the first woman to referee in the Melrose Sevens. On 16 November 2019, she refereed the Stirling County v Southern Knights match in the Super 6. In January 2021 Davidson was appointed to officiate a men's professional match for the first time. That match, and a subsequent match to which she was appointed, were cancelled, and she was then appointed in March 2021 to a further Pro14 fixture. She refereed her first Pro14 fixture on 19 March 2021; a Munster v Benetton match, winning plaudits from the Munster Head Coach Johann van Graan: "I thought the referee was very good. She was very calm, she communicated to the players exceptionally well before the game. I felt she handled the game really well and I think a real good step forward for her and was very pleased with her performance."

Davidson refereed the 1872 Cup match on 18 March 2022 between Glasgow Warriors and Edinburgh Rugby in the United Rugby Championship.

In May 2025, Davidson refereed the final of the 2024-25 EPCR Challenge Cup, becoming the first female referee for a European Final.

=== International career ===
From 2017, Davidson has refereed in the World Rugby Women's Sevens. In 2018, she refereed in the Rugby Europe, the Commonwealth Games and the Rugby World Cup Sevens.

Davidson has refereed in the 2019 Women's Six Nations Championship in the Wales v Ireland match on 17 March 2019.

In 2021, Davidson was chosen as one of the referees for the rugby sevens tournament at the delayed 2020 Summer Olympics.

In 2022, she was appointed to an all-women team of match officials for a men's test match in Lisbon between a Tier 1 side, Italy, and the host Portugal.

In November 2022, Davidson was appointed to referee the final of the 2021 Rugby World Cup between hosts New Zealand and England.

In 2023, Davidson was the only female member of the panel of referees for the 2023 World Rugby U20 Championship. She was also appointed to be an assistant referee in three full international warm-up matches for the 2023 Rugby World Cup. In December 2023, Davidson was appointed to be an assistant referee at the England v Wales men's match in February 2024, where she became the first female assistant referee in a men's Six Nations Championship match.

On 20 July 2024, Davidson refereed a test match between South Africa and Portugal in Bloemfontein, becoming the first woman to referee a Springboks match.

In September 2025, Davidson was the referee for the final of the 2025 Women's Rugby World Cup between Canada and England, making her the only referee other than André Watson to oversee two Rugby World Cup finals.

In November 2025, Davidson refereed Wales vs New Zealand in Cardiff, making her the first woman to referee an All Blacks test match.

On 14 February 2026, Davidson became the first female to referee a Six Nations men's match, when she officiated at the game between Ireland and Italy at the Aviva Stadium in Dublin. In April, she stood down from refereeing the 2026 Women's Six Nations to focus on the men's game.

On 18 April 2026, she became the first woman to referee a Top 14 match, between ASM Clermont-Auvergne and Lyon at Michelin Stadium.

On 11 July 2026, she became the first woman to referee a Nations Championship match between Fiji and England at the Hill Dickinson (Everton) Stadium

== Personal life ==
Davidson has a degree in economic history from Edinburgh University. Davidson is openly gay.
