= Tokasa Seniyasi =

Fijian rugby sevens player (born 1999)

Personal information
- Nationality: Fijian
- Born: 10 July 1999 (age 25)

Sport
- Sport: Rugby sevens

Tokasa Seniyasi (born 10 July 1999) is a Fijian rugby sevens player. She was originally to compete in the women's tournament at the 2020 Summer Olympics, but had to withdraw due to injury.
