= Tyla King =

New Zealand international rugby union & league player

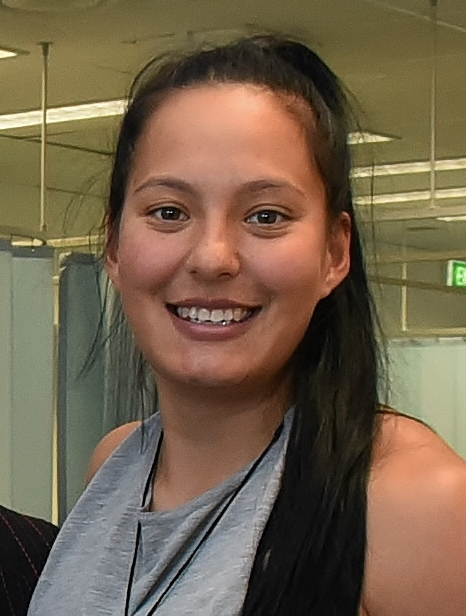
- Nathan-Wong in 2017
- Born: Tyla Nathan-Wong; 1 July 1994 (age 32) Auckland, New Zealand
- Height: 1.65 m (5 ft 5 in)
- Weight: 60 kg (132 lb)
- School: Lynfield College

Rugby union career
- Position: Halfback
Provincial / State sides
Years	Team	Apps	(Points)
2012	Auckland Sevens		(0)
2016	Auckland	5	(15)
2020–2021	Northland	7	(25)
Super Rugby
Years	Team	Apps	(Points)
2022	Blues Women	2	(0)
International career
Years	Team	Apps	(Points)
2010–	NZ Women's Touch team		
2011	NZ U19 Women's Touch Team		
2022	New Zealand	1	(0)
National sevens teams
Years	Team		Comps
2012–2024	New Zealand		195
2012	Maori Women's Sevens		
- Rugby league career

Playing information
- Position: Five-eighth
Club
Years	Team	Pld	T	G	FG	P
2023–24	St. George Illawarra Dragons	11	3	4	0	20
2025–	Cronulla Sharks	8	0	0	0	0
	Total	19	3	4	0	20
Representative
Years	Team	Pld	T	G	FG	P
2024–25	New Zealand	7	0	4	0	8
- As of 9 November 2025
Medal record
Women's rugby sevens
Representing New Zealand
Olympic Games
Gold medal – first place	2024 Paris	Team competition
Gold medal – first place	2020 Tokyo	Team competition
Silver medal – second place	2016 Rio de Janeiro	Team competition
Commonwealth Games
Gold medal – first place	2018 Gold Coast	Team competition
Bronze medal – third place	2022 Birmingham	Team competition
Rugby World Cup Sevens
Gold medal – first place	2018 San Francisco	Team competition
Gold medal – first place	2013 Moscow	Team competition

Tyla King (née Nathan-Wong; born 1 July 1994) is a New Zealand international rugby union player, professional rugby league player and Olympian.

She played touch rugby, tag rugby and both sevens and fifteen-a-side rugby union as a teenager before in 2012 at the age of 18 she made her debut as a professional rugby sevens player when she was selected for the New Zealand sevens team. During her time with the team, which she captained on a number of occasions, they won the World Rugby Women's Sevens Series in 2012–13, 2013–14, 2014–15, 2016–17, 2018–19, 2019–20, and 2022–23. With them she won a silver medal at the 2016 Summer Olympics in Rio de Janeiro and back-to-back gold medals at the 2020 Summer Olympics in Tokyo and the 2024 Summer Olympics in Paris.

In May 2023, she was released from her contract with New Zealand Rugby to play rugby league for the Australian club St. George Illawarra Dragons in the NRL Women's Premiership. This led to her being selected in October 2023 for the New Zealand women's national rugby league team for whom she has played three matches to date. She returned to the New Zealand women sevens rugby team in early 2024 before retiring from international sevens rugby after the Paris Olympics. She is currently the highest women points scorer in the history of the women sevens series.

As well as touch, sevens rugby, fifteen-a-side and rugby league, King has represented New Zealand in tag rugby.

== Early life ==
Nathan-Wong was born in Auckland on 1 July 1994 to Deanne and Russell Nathan-Wong. Her grandfather, David Wong was born in New Zealand to immigrants from Guangzhou. He became close friends with Roger Bailey, who would later go on to play 30 times for the New Zealand national rugby league team between 1961 and 1970. As a result of their friendship Wong began playing rugby league as a youth for Ponsonby at a time when it was unusual for a person of Asian descendent to play contact sports. He progressed to the senior grades during which time his team in 1967 won the region's premier competition, the Fox Memorial Shield. That same year Wong became the full-blooded Chinese to play for the Auckland team. All four of Wong's daughters initially tried playing rugby league but found that their small statue made it tough to handle the physical contact so they switched to playing touch rugby. Korina and Michele becoming provincial touch representatives, while Sheree and Deanne, represented New Zealand.

Nathan-Wong’s father, Russell (who is of part-European part-Maori descent) played rugby league in his youth. She grew up in the Auckland suburb of Blockhouse Bay and attended Blockhouse Bay Primary School. At primary school the first sport that Nathan-Wong played was mixed gender under-nines rugby league, and she was the only girl playing. She was eventually forced to give up rugby league as mixed gender teams ended at the age of 10 and at the time there was not pathway to continue playing in a female only competition. Following primary school she attended Blockhouse Bay Intermediate.

Her secondary education was received at Lynfield College. At Lynfield she competed in athletics, basketball, football and taekwondo (in which she obtained a red belt). Because of her short statue she wasn’t selected for the school’s intermediate basketball team. In football Nathan-Wong played In 2004 in the Metro Boys 10th Grade team; in 2004 and 2005 in the Auckland Weir Rose Bowl Football Under-12 Girls team; in 2005 in Three Kings United 13th Grade Girls Division team, in 2006 in the Three Kings United 15th Grade Girls Division 1 team; in 2008 in the West Auckland Women’s Premier Reserves team, in 2009 in both the United Soccer Under-15 Girls and the Waitakere Women’s Premier teams.

In 2011, she won the college’s senior girls' cross-country title, as well as awarded the Dux Ludorum honour by the college.

== Rugby career ==
=== Touch rugby ===
She first came to notice when in 2004 when she played for the Auckland Under-11 Mixed touch rugby team. Moving up the grades she captained the Auckland Under-13 Mixed team in 2005 and 2006.

In 2007 she played for both the North Harbour Under-13 Mixed and the North Harbour Under-15 Girls' teams. From 2006 to 2009 she played for the Northern Pirates Under-15 girls team (which consisted of girls from Auckland, North Harbour and Counties Manukau). She captained the team in 2008.

She was captain of the Lynfield College team that competed in the greater Auckland secondary schools junior touch champs in November 2008. The team, which was coached by her mother Deanne lost in the final Manurewa High. Nathan-Wong was named the most valuable player at the tournament. In 2008 she was a member of the Auckland Under-15 (which she captained), Waitakere Māori Open Women’s team and Auckland Open Women’s teams.

In 2010 she captained the Auckland Under-17 Girls team, was a member of the Auckland Under-19 Women’s team, captained the New Zealand Under-17 Girls team and was a member of the New Zealand Women's team. Also in 2010 she was a member of the Māori Touch Nationals Aotearoa Open Women’s team and a member of the World Indigenous Tournament Tainui Under-21 Women’s team.

In 2011 she captained the Waikato under-21 women’s and the Māori under-21 women’s team. In that same year she also represented her country as a member of the New Zealand Under-19 Women's team and in the New Zealand Open Women’s team. The latter team won silver medals at the Touch World Cup in Edinburgh, Scotland in June 2011. At 16 she was the youngest female player to have ever represented New Zealand at a Touch World Cup.

In 2012 she served in the New Zealand team at the Tag Rugby World Cup which was held at North Harbour Stadium in Auckland, New Zealand.

Her international touch rugby career ended with her having played 13 games for New Zealand.

=== Rugby sevens ===
She first began playing rugby union in 2008, when she became member of Lynfield College's 10 a side team. This eventually lead to Lynfield College's Sport Coordinator Vaniya Lavea (who had played for the Black Ferns) introducing her to playing club rugby with the Auckland Marist Women's team.

She first came to notice in Sevens rugby when she played for the Auckland Under-18 Secondary Girls team in 2012, which led to her being selected in that same year for the Counties Manukau women's sevens team. Initially she wasn’t considered for the New Zealand sevens team as the coach considered her to be too small. However her obvious talent after an outstanding performance for the Auckland Sevens team at the National Sevens Tournament lead to her being selected at the age of 17 and then making her debut for the Sevens team as an 18-year-old in August 2012 at the Oceania Sevens tournament in Churchill Park, Lautoka in Fiji. At the time she was the youngest woman to have ever been selected for the team.

Prior to joining the sevens team she had no experience with taking drop kicks. This ended when she the coaches took her aside at practice and informed her that she was the halfback, with responsibly for taking conversion and restart drop kicks. It took her approximately a year to reach what she considered a acceptable standard and she substantially improved further with assistance from Dan Carter and Mick Byrne who was the All Blacks kicking coach from 2005 to 2015.

In 2013 she was a member of the Sevens team that won that year’s Rugby World Cup Sevens in Moscow. In 2016 Nathan-Wong was a member of New Zealand team that won a silver medal in the Women’s Sevens competition at the 2016 Summer Olympics. In 2018, Nathan-Wong was a member of the team that won both the 2018 Commonwealth Games held on the Gold Coast in Australia, as well as the Rugby World Cup Sevens in San Francisco, United States.

In 2019, Nathan-Wong was nominated as a World Rugby Women's Sevens Player of the Year having completed the season as the top goal kicker in the tournament.

In 2020 at the Sydney Sevens competition after kicking a conversion against France she became the first Black Ferns sevens player and only the second woman in the history of the Sevens Series competition to reach 1,000 points.

In July 2021, she was a member of the New Zealand team that won the gold medal in the women's event at the 2020 Summer Olympics.

In 2022 Nathan-Wong was member of the New Zealand Sevens team which won a bronze medal at the 2022 Commonwealth Games in Birmingham. As a result of the lingering concussion, she received while playing in August 2022 against Australia for the New Zealand fifteen-a-side team she wasn’t available for the Sevens World Cup in September 2022. She returned to captain the Sevens team at first two games of the 2022–23 Sevens season, in Dubai and Cape Town in December 2022. In the final at Cape Town she scored two tries and kicked three conversions.

Following the completion of her break to play rugby league in 2023 and after missing to first two tournaments of the 2023–24 season she returned to the New Zealand sevens team in January 2024.

During the New Zealand win over Brazil at the Los Angeles tournament on 2 March 2024 she over overtook Ghislaine Landry to become the highest women points scorer in the history of the sevens series.

On 20 June 2024 it was announced that she was a member of the New Zealand Women’s Rugby Sevens team for the Paris Olympics. The team won the gold medal, defeating Canada 19–12 in the final to give both her and New Zealand back-to-back Olympic gold medals. This was her last appearance for the New Zealand sevens team as previously on 10 July 2024 King had announced that she would be retiring from international sevens after the Paris Olympics to concentrate on her rugby league career.

=== Fifteens ===
In 2010 she was recruited to attend a quickly arranged quadrangular series played in Hopuhopu, near Ngāruawāhia involving various regional teams which served as a trial to select players for New Zealand fifteen-a-side team to contest the 2010 Rugby World Cup. She never made the side.

Her first fifteen-a-side appearance at provincial level was in 2016 when she played five games at halfback and scored 15 points for Auckland. In 2020 and 2021 she played a total of seven games at halfback on loan for Northland in the Farah Palmer Cup during which she scored 25 points. Her performance for Northland in 2021 was so compelling that the she was named at halfback in the 2022 Rugby Almanack's "New Zealand XV".

She joined the Blues for the inaugural Super Rugby Aupiki competition.

Nathan-Wong got her first Black Ferns XV's call up after she was selected for the Laurie O'Reilly Cup Test series against Australia. She made her test debut for New Zealand as halfback when she came off the bench in the second half of their game at Orangetheory Stadium in Christchurch against Australia on 20 August 2022 when they won. Her debut was marred by a head knock which led to a lingering concussion which subsequently ruled her out of the Black Ferns XV’s World Cup squad.

=== Rugby league ===
At her request she was released from her contract with New Zealand Rugby in May 2023.

This release allowed her to sign a one-year contract on 24 May 2023 with NRLW rugby league team the St George Illawarra Dragons with a view to later returning to sevens to play in the 2024 Paris Olympics.

Nathan-Wong made her Rugby League and club debut at five-eighth on 22 July 2023 for the Dragons against the reigning NRLW champions Newcastle Knights, during which she scored a try. She played a total of nine games during her first season.

In 2023 she was selected for the New Zealand women's rugby league squad in compete in the Pacific Championship competition against Australia and Tonga. She was a member of the team that on 28 October 2023 beat Australia 12–6, in what was New Zealand’s first win over their trans-Tasman rivals in seven years.

After arriving back in New Zealand from the Paris Olympics on the morning of 2 August 2024 King departed three days later to commence a contract extension which will keep her playing with the St George Illawarra Dragons until the end of the 2025 season.

== Awards and honours ==
In 2011 she received the Māori achievement in sport award and the Junior Sportswoman award at the Sport Waitakere Koru Awards. In 2012 and 2013, she won the Junior Māori Sportswoman of the Year award and was a finalist for the same award in 2014.

In 2015 and 2019, Nathan-Wong was named New Zealand Sevens Player of the Year. In 2020, Nathan-Wong was named Massey’s Distance Sportswoman of the year.

At the 2023 World Rugby Sevens Series Awards in May 2023 Nathan-Wong was named as a member of the 2023 women's dream team.

For her performance during the 2022–23 Sevens series Nathan-Wong was named the World Rugby Women’s Sevens Player of the Year in October 2023.

== Personal life ==
She is of the Ngāpuhi tribe, and is also of Chinese and European descent.

After competing her secondary education she began studying at the Auckland University of Technology, but due to her sporting commitments struggled to make process until she transitioned in 2015 to long distance study at Massey University. She was finally able to complete her studies when in 2023 she graduated with a Bachelor of Sport and Exercise.

She married waka ama (outrigger canoes) sportsman Tupuria King in early January 2024. In 2019, King won the Te Tai Tokorau Māori Male Sports Award.
