= São Paulo Sevens =

Women's rugby

- Sport: Rugby sevens
- First season: 2014
- Folded: 2016
- No. of teams: 12
- Last champion: Australia
- Most titles: Australia (2 times)

São Paulo Sevens was an annual women's Rugby sevens tournament, and one of five stops on the IRB Women's Sevens World Series. São Paulo joined in the second year of the Series.

== Cup winners ==
Year	Winner	Score	Runner-up
2014	Australia	24-12	New Zealand
2015	New Zealand	17–10	Australia
2016	Australia	29–0	Canada

== 2014 ==
The 2014 edition of the tournament took place at Arena Barueri, São Paulo on 21–22 February 2014. A total of twelve teams competed: The eight "core" teams, and four invited teams.

Core Teams

Invited Teams

- Australia
- Canada
- England
- Ireland
- New Zealand
- Russia
- Spain
- United States
- Brazil
- Netherlands
- Argentina
- Japan

== 2015 ==
The 2015 edition of the tournament took place at Arena Barueri, São Paulo on 7–8 February 2015. A total of twelve teams competed:

- Australia
- Brazil
- Canada
- China
- England
- Fiji
- France
- New Zealand
- Russia
- South Africa
- Spain
- United States

== 2016 ==
The 2016 edition of the tournament took place at Arena Barueri, São Paulo on 20–21 February 2015. A total of twelve teams competed:

- Australia
- Brazil
- Canada
- England
- Fiji
- France
- Ireland
- Japan
- New Zealand
- Russia
- Spain
- United States
