= 2015 São Paulo Women's Sevens =

- Women's Sevens Series III
- Host nation: Brazil
- Date: 7–8 February 2015

Cup
- Champion: New Zealand
- Runner-up: Australia
- Third: Canada

Plate
- Winner: England
- Runner-up: United States

Bowl
- Winner: Fiji
- Runner-up: Spain

Tournament details
- Matches played: 34
- Most points: (New Zealand) Portia Woodman (65)
- Most tries: (New Zealand) Portia Woodman (13)

The 2015 São Paulo Women's Sevens was the second tournament of the 2014–15 World Rugby Women's Sevens Series. It was held over the weekend of 7–8 February 2015 at Arena Barueri in São Paulo metropolitan area, and was the second edition of the Women's São Paulo Sevens as part of the World Rugby Women's Sevens Series.

== Format ==
The teams are drawn into three pools of four teams each. Each team plays every other team in their pool once. The top two teams from each pool advance to the Cup/Plate brackets while the top 2 third place teams also compete in the Cup/Plate. The other teams from each group play-off for the Bowl.

== Teams ==
The participating teams and schedule were announced on 15 October 2014.

- Australia
- Brazil
- Canada
- China
- England
- Fiji
- France
- New Zealand
- Russia
- South Africa
- Spain
- United States

== Pool Stage ==
Key to colours in group tables
Teams that advanced to the Cup Quarterfinal

=== Pool A ===
Team	Pld	W	D	L	PF	PA	PD	Pts
New Zealand	3	3	0	0	125	19	+106	9
France	3	2	0	1	42	73	–31	7
United States	3	1	0	2	50	56	–6	5
Spain	3	0	0	3	21	90	–69	3

7 February 2015
11:44

France	28–7	Spain

Arena Barueri, São Paulo

7 February 2015
12:06

New Zealand	35–12	United States

Arena Barueri, São Paulo

7 February 2015
14:28

New Zealand	36–7	Spain

Arena Barueri, São Paulo

7 February 2015
14:50

France	14–12	United States

Arena Barueri, São Paulo

7 February 2015
17:12

New Zealand	54–0	France

Arena Barueri, São Paulo

7 February 2015
17:34

United States	26–7	Spain

Arena Barueri, São Paulo

=== Pool B ===
Team	Pld	W	D	L	PF	PA	PD	Pts
Australia	3	3	0	0	116	14	+102	9
Brazil	3	2	0	1	50	68	–18	7
Fiji	3	1	0	2	54	71	–17	5
China	3	0	0	3	28	95	–67	3

7 February 2015
11:00

Fiji	33–7	China

Arena Barueri, São Paulo

7 February 2015
11:22

Australia	40–0	Brazil

Arena Barueri, São Paulo

7 February 2015
13:44

Australia	38–7	China

Arena Barueri, São Paulo

7 February 2015
14:06

Fiji	14–26	Brazil

Arena Barueri, São Paulo

7 February 2015
16:28

Australia	38–7	Fiji

Arena Barueri, São Paulo

7 February 2015
16:50

Brazil	24–14	China

Arena Barueri, São Paulo

=== Pool C ===
Team	Pld	W	D	L	PF	PA	PD	Pts
Canada	3	3	0	0	70	29	+41	9
Russia	3	1	1	1	64	37	+27	6
England	3	1	1	1	65	46	+19	6
South Africa	3	0	0	3	10	97	–87	3

7 February 2015
12:28

England	31–5	South Africa

Arena Barueri, São Paulo

7 February 2015
12:50

Canada	20–7	Russia

Arena Barueri, São Paulo

7 February 2015
15:12

Canada	26–5	South Africa

Arena Barueri, São Paulo

7 February 2015
15:34

England	17–17	Russia

Arena Barueri, São Paulo

7 February 2015
17:56

Canada	24–17	England

Arena Barueri, São Paulo

7 February 2015
18:18

Russia	40–0	South Africa

Arena Barueri, São Paulo

== Knockout stage ==
=== Bowl ===
Semi-finals
8 February 2015 - 12:28 - Arena Barueri, São Paulo
Fiji	24
South Africa	22
8 February 2015 - 12:50 - Arena Barueri, São Paulo
China	5
Spain	7

Final
8 February 2015 - 16:36 - Arena Barueri, São Paulo
Fiji	17
Spain	12
Third place
8 February 2015 - 15:34 - Arena Barueri, São Paulo
South Africa	17
China	31

=== Plate ===
Quarter-finals
8 February 2015 - 11:00 - Arena Barueri, São Paulo
New Zealand	28
United States	17
8 February 2015 - 11:22 - Arena Barueri, São Paulo
Brazil	0
France	31
8 February 2015 - 11:44 - Arena Barueri, São Paulo
Canada	22
Russia	10
8 February 2015 - 12:06 - Arena Barueri, São Paulo
Australia	29
England	10

Semi-finals
8 February 2015 - 14:06 - Arena Barueri, São Paulo
United States	19
Brazil	0
8 February 2015 - 14:28 - Arena Barueri, São Paulo
Russia	12
England	22

Final
8 February 2015 - 17:28 - Arena Barueri, São Paulo
United States	5
England	14
Third place
8 February 2015 - 17:06 - Arena Barueri, São Paulo
Brazil	5
Russia	12

=== Cup ===
Quarter-finals
8 February 2015 - 11:00 - Arena Barueri, São Paulo
New Zealand	28
United States	17
8 February 2015 - 11:22 - Arena Barueri, São Paulo
Brazil	0
France	31
8 February 2015 - 11:44 - Arena Barueri, São Paulo
Canada	22
Russia	10
8 February 2015 - 12:06 - Arena Barueri, São Paulo
Australia	29
England	10

Semi-finals
8 February 2015 - 14:50 - Arena Barueri, São Paulo
New Zealand	12
France	5
8 February 2015 - 15:12 - Arena Barueri, São Paulo
Canada	7
Australia	12

Final
8 February 2015 - 18:20 - Arena Barueri, São Paulo
New Zealand	17
Australia	10
Third place
8 February 2015 - 17:52 - Arena Barueri, São Paulo
France	0
Canada	19
