= Dubai Women's Sevens =

Annual rugby sevens tournament

The Dubai Women's Sevens is an annual rugby sevens tournament held in Dubai, UAE. The tournament includes several competitions including, since 1994, an international women's invitational competition. Though most entrants are ad hoc sides composed of club and international players from a variety of (generally European) countries, some are official national selections - the results of matches between such sides appear below.

The first Dubai women's sevens competition was held in 1994, where it was won by Kuwait who defeated the Royal Hong Kong Police in the final. Until the 2007 edition was held at the Dubai Exiles Rugby Ground, in 2008 it moved to The Sevens, a new stadium built to host the 2009 Rugby World Cup Sevens. The 2009 competition took place between 3–5 December.

In 2011, a new competition was launched by International Rugby Board (IRB) - the IRB Women's Challenge Cup - as a first step towards a full schedule of IRB-sponsored women's sevens events for 2012–13 season. It featured eight official national teams. The traditional international women's invitational competition also took place on neighbouring pitches.

On 4 October 2012, the IRB announced the launch of the IRB Women's Sevens World Series for the 2012–13 season. The Dubai competition will be the first of four events in the inaugural season.

== Results ==
Year	Venue	Cup final			Placings			Ref
IRB Challenge		Winner	Score	Runner-up	Plate	Bowl	Shield	
2011	The Sevens	Canada	26–7	England	Australia	Spain	n/a	
World Series		Winner	Score	Runner-up	Plate	Bowl	Shield	
2012	The Sevens	New Zealand	41–0	South Africa	Spain	Russia	United States	
2013	The Sevens	Australia	35–27	New Zealand	Russia	England	Fiji	
2014	The Sevens	New Zealand	19–17	Australia	Canada	England	Brazil	
2015	The Sevens	Australia	31–12	Russia	England	New Zealand	Japan	
		Winner	Score	Runner-up	Third	Fourth	Fifth	
2016	The Sevens	New Zealand	17–5	Australia	Russia	England	Fiji	
2017	The Sevens	Australia	34–0	United States	Russia	Canada	New Zealand	
2018	The Sevens	New Zealand	26–14	Canada	Australia	United States	Russia	
2019	The Sevens	New Zealand	17–14	Canada	United States	Australia	France	
2020	The Sevens	Tournament cancelled						
2021; I	The Sevens	Australia	22–7	Fiji	France	Russia	Great Britain	
2021; II	The Sevens	Australia	15–5	Fiji	France	Russia	United States	
2022	The Sevens	Australia	26–19	New Zealand	United States	France	Fiji	
2023	The Sevens	Australia	26–19	New Zealand	France	Canada	Fiji	
2024	The Sevens	Australia	28–24	New Zealand	France	Great Britain	United States	

=== Earlier winners ===
- 2008: England
- 2009: France
- 2010: Samurai International RFC
- 1994: Kuwait

== Dubai Tournament 2006 ==
No official national selections.

== Dubai Tournament 2007 ==
Played on 1 and 2 December 2007 at Dubai (Source Canada Union). Participants included Canada and USA, but there were no inter-national matches.

== Dubai Tournament 2008 ==
Date: 27–29 November 2008.

- England played as England Sporting Chance Foundation. USA did not have this tournament listed as part of their preparation. Netherlands and Canada are believed to have been near full strength as were the England team. A Kenyan team had entered, but withdrew (Source Netherlands rugby).

Group Games

- Sporting Chance Foundation (England) 34-7 USA
- Canada 33–5 WOP Netherlands

Semi Final

- Sporting Chance Foundation (England) 12-5 Canada
- England went on to win the final. USA and Canada were joint third. Netherlands won the plate.
- At the same time a "Gulf" competition was played but the results are not included as none of the "nations" has its own union.

Full results

== Dubai Tournament 2009 ==
Venue/Date: 4 December 2009, Dubai. As ever the status of some teams is debatable. Possible International match ups are:

Group Games

- Georgia 0–54 Arabian Gulf
- France 21–12 USA
- Kenya 17–21 Arabian Gulf
- Georgia 0–41 Kenya

Classification Stages

- Kenya 5–26 USA (Plate semi-final)
- France finished as champions
- Arabian Gulf and Kenya both lost in the Plate semi-finals
- USA lost in the Plate final

All results

== Dubai Tournament 2010 ==
Venue/Date: 2–3 December 2009, Dubai. As ever the status of some teams is debatable. Fixtures between what appear to be international teams are:

Group Games

- France 35 Brazil 0
- France 12 Almaty-Kazakhstan 0
- Almaty-Kazakhstan 12 Brazil 7
- France finished as runners-up (winners Samurai Dubai included several England players).
- Kenya and Almaty-Kazakhstan lost in the cup quarter-finals
- Brazil finished as runner-up in the Plate (losing to Pink Ba-Baas, composed of English club players).

(Full results)

== Dubai Tournament 2011 ==
2–3 December 2011

=== IRB Women's Sevens Challenge Cup ===
The first fully sanctioned IRB women's tournament (apart from the 2009 World Cup). Held alongside that year's Dubai Sevens and the normal Women's Invitational, with the semi-finals, the final and all of the Pool A games held on the main pitch. Part of a plan to launch a full IRB International Women's Sevens Series for 2012–13. Selection criteria were not revealed by the IRB, though the teams selected and the seedings roughly reflected the 2009 World Cup rankings - but with China and Brazil invited instead of Spain and France in order to give worldwide representation. Spain were later included when New Zealand declined their invitation to attend.

POOL A

Nation	Won	Drawn	Lost	For	Against
Canada	3	0	0	64	21
Australia	2	0	1	59	19
Spain	1	0	2	36	31
Brazil	0	0	3	0	88

- Australia 12–5 Spain
- Canada 31–0 Brazil
- Australia 40–0 Brazil
- Canada 19–14 Spain
- Australia 7–14 Canada
- Spain 17–0 Brazil

5th to 8th Place

- South Africa 19–5 Brazil
- Spain 22–14 China

7th Place

- Brazil 14–17 China

5th Place

- South Africa 0–28 Spain

POOL B

Nation	Won	Drawn	Lost	For	Against
England	3	0	0	79	34
USA	2	0	1	36	48
South Africa	1	0	2	57	58
China	0	0	3	36	68

- USA 22–10 South Africa
- England 26–15 China
- USA 14–7 China
- England 22–19 South Africa
- South Africa 28–14 China
- England 31–0 USA

Semi Finals

- England 12–10 Australia
- Canada 36–0 USA

3rd Place

- Australia 22–5 USA

Final

- England 7–26 Canada

=== Women's International Invitational Tournament ===
This tournament, as usual, featured a mixture of national selections and international invitational teams. The official national teams were France and Kenya in Pool A, and Netherlands and "Maple Leafs" (the Canadian development team) in Pool B. Unofficial teams were Moscow Region and Tuks (South African universities) in Pool A, and Iron Ladies (Ukraine) and Team Globaleye (international team) in Pool B.

- Netherlands reach the final, where they beat the Maple Leafs
- France were knocked-out in the semi-finals by Maple Leafs
- Kenya lost all of their pool games, but finished as runner-up in the plate.

The following are the results of the games involving the official national selections (including the Maple Leafs, though their games are not internationals) - full results can be found here.

Pool games

- Netherlands 21–0 Maple Leafs
- France 35–0 Kenya

Semi-finals

- France 0–12 Maple Leafs

Final

- Netherlands 17–5 Maple Leafs

== Dubai Tournament 2012 ==
=== IRB Women's Sevens World Series ===
Group A

Nation	Won	Drawn	Lost	For	Against
South Africa	2	0	1	39	15
England	2	0	1	44	27
Spain	2	0	1	31	17
Brazil	0	0	3	5	60

- England 5-20 South Africa
- Spain 19-0 Brazil
- England 22-0 Brazil
- South Africa 0-5 Spain
- Brazil 5-19 South Africa
- England 17-7 Spain

Group B

Nation	Won	Drawn	Lost	For	Against
Russia	2	1	0	54	24
New Zealand	1	2	0	55	24
Canada	1	1	1	58	27
China	0	0	3	0	83

- Canada 12-15 Russia
- New Zealand 31-0 China
- Canada 32-0 China
- Russia 12-12 New Zealand
- China 0-27 Russia
- Canada 12-12 New Zealand

Plate Semi Finals (5th-8th)

- Canada 24–0 England
- Netherlands 5–21 Russia

7th/8th Match

- England 26–5 Netherlands

Plate final: 5th/6th Match

- Canada 10–14 Russia

Group C

Nation	Won	Drawn	Lost	For	Against
Australia	3	0	0	68	19
Netherlands	2	0	1	38	43
United States	1	0	2	41	39
France	0	0	3	24	70

- Australia 24-12 Netherlands
- United States 27-12 France
- Australia 29-0 France
- United States 7-12 Netherlands
- France 12-14 Netherlands
- Australia 15-7 United States

Bowl Semi Finals (9th-12th)

- France 22–0 Brazil
- USA 36–7 China

11th/12th Match

- Brazil 17–19 China

Bowl final:9th/10th Match

- France 12–26 USA

Quarter-finals (1st-8th)

- Australia 14–10 Canada
- New Zealand 31–0 England
- South Africa 12–7 Netherlands
- Russia 5–7 Spain

Cup Semi Finals (1st-4th)

- Australia 12–24 New Zealand
- South Africa 19–17 Spain

3rd/4th place

- Australia 5–17 Spain

Cup Final: 1st/2nd place

- New Zealand 41–0 South Africa

=== Women's Invitational Tournament ===
- Maple Leafs 17–0 Kenya Lionesses
- UAE Women 0–7 Moscow Region
- Tuks Ladies Rugby 7s 5–10 Swedish Vikings 7s
- Maple Leafs 36–0 UAE Women
- Moscow Region 12–12 Swedish Vikings 7s
- Kenya Lionesses 21–0 Tuks Ladies Rugby 7s
- Maple Leafs 32–0 Moscow Region
- Kenya Lionesses 22–14 Swedish Vikings 7s
- UAE Women 0–22 Tuks Ladies Rugby 7s
- Maple Leafs 29–0 Tuks Ladies Rugby 7s
- Kenya Lionesses 7–5 Moscow Region
- UAE Women 0–15 Swedish Vikings 7s
- Kenya Lionesses 12–5 UAE Women
- Maple Leafs 22–7 Swedish Vikings 7s
- Moscow Region 0–12 Tuks Ladies Rugby 7s

Nation	Won	Drawn	Lost	For	Against
Maple Leafs	5	0	0	136	7
Kenya Lionesses	4	0	1	62	41
Swedish Vikings	2	1	2	68	51
Tuks	2	0	3	39	60
Moscow Region	1	1	3	24	63
UAE	0	0	5	5	92

Semi-finals

- Maple Leafs 31–7 Tuks
- Kenya Lionesses 7–0 Swedish Vikings

Final

- Maple Leafs 27–5 Kenya Lionesses

== Dubai Tournament 2014 ==
=== IRB Women's Sevens World Series ===
Group A

Nation	Won	Drawn	Lost	For	Against
New Zealand	3	0	0	96	31
United States	2	0	1	97	36
Russia	1	0	2	71	51
China	0	0	3	5	151

- New Zealand 43–0 China
- Russia 12–17 United States
- New Zealand 24–19 United States
- Russia 47–5 China
- United States 61–0 China
- New Zealand 29–12 Russia

Group B

Nation	Won	Drawn	Lost	For	Against
Australia	3	0	0	99	10
France	2	0	1	65	31
South Africa	0	1	2	17	53
Spain	0	1	2	17	86

- Australia 36–0 South Africa
- Spain 0–31 France
- Australia 24–10 France
- Spain 17–17 South Africa
- France 24–7 South Africa
- Australia 39–0 Spain

Plate Semi Finals (5th-8th)

- Fiji 24–21 United States
- England 21–19 Russia

7th/8th Match

- United States 22–20 Russia

Plate final: 5th/6th Match

- England 12–19 Fiji (AET)

Group C

Nation	Won	Drawn	Lost	For	Against
England	3	0	0	72	19
Canada	2	0	1	85	32
Fiji	1	0	2	28	67
Brazil	0	0	3	22	47

- Canada 26–10 Brazil
- England 26–0 Fiji
- Canada 47–5 Fiji
- England 29–7 Brazil
- Fiji 21–12 Brazil
- England 17–12 Canada

Bowl Semi Finals (9th-12th)

- South Africa 17–0 China
- Spain 14–19 Brazil

11th/12th Match

- China 5–28 Spain

Bowl final:9th/10th Match

- South Africa 7–17 Brazil

Quarter-finals (1st-8th)

- Australia 47–0 Fiji
- United States 0–36 Canada
- England 5–7 France
- New Zealand 19–17 Russia

Cup Semi Finals (1st-4th)

- Australia 29–7 Canada
- France 10–31 New Zealand

3rd/4th place

- Canada 10–5 France (AET)

Cup Final: 1st/2nd place

- Australia 17–19 New Zealand

=== International Invitational ===
Group A

Nation	Won	Drawn	Lost	For	Against
Tribe (AUS)	4	0	0	91	20
Almaty (KAZ)	3	0	1	73	40
WC Vikings (SWE)	2	0	2	60	48
Angels	1	0	3	46	77
Tuks (RSA)	0	0	4	24	80

- Angels 12–19 Almaty
- WC Vikings 31–5 Tuks
- Almaty 17–7 WC Vikings
- Tribe 24–5 Angels
- WC Vikings 0–19 Tribe
- Tuks 7–27 Almaty
- Tribe 34–5 Tuks
- Angels 7–22 WC Vikings
- Almaty 10–14 Tribe
- Tuks 12–22 Angels

Bowl final (9th-10th)

- Tuks 24–5 Georgia

Plate Semi Finals (5th-8th)

- WC Vikings 5–12 Kenya
- Wales 41–0 Angels

Plate final: 5th/6th Match

- Wales 29–0 Kenya

Group C

Nation	Won	Drawn	Lost	For	Against
Ireland	3	1	0	126	24
Moscow	3	1	0	102	26
Wales	2	0	2	79	76
Kenya	1	0	3	51	100
Georgia	0	0	4	12	116

- Ireland 12–12 Moscow
- Wales 24–12 Kenya
- Moscow 24–7 Wales
- Georgia 0–48 Ireland
- Kenya 7–28 Moscow
- Wales 43–7 Georgia
- Ireland 33–5 Wales
- Georgia 5–25 Kenya
- Moscow 38–0 Georgia
- Kenya 7–43 Ireland

Cup Semi Finals (1st-4th)

- Ireland 24–19 Almaty
- Tribe 17–12 Moscow

Cup Final: 1st/2nd place

- Tribe 0–19 Ireland

== Dubai Tournament 2015 ==
=== IRB Women's Sevens World Series ===
Group A

Nation	Won	Drawn	Lost	For	Against
Russia	3	0	0	95	24
New Zealand	2	0	1	64	50
France	1	0	2	54	47
Brazil	0	0	3	10	102

- New Zealand 7–33 Russia
- France 25–5 Brazil
- New Zealand 36–5 Brazil
- France 17–21 Russia
- New Zealand 21–12 France
- Russia 41–0 Brazil

Group B

Nation	Won	Drawn	Lost	For	Against
Fiji	3	0	0	75	39
Canada	2	0	1	62	31
Ireland	1	0	2	29	49
United States	0	0	3	24	71

- Canada 10–24 Fiji
- United States 5–12 Ireland
- Canada 17–7 Ireland
- United States 19–24 Fiji
- Canada 35–5 United States
- Fiji 27–10 Ireland

Plate Semi Finals (5th-8th)

- Spain 12–21 Canada
- Fiji 12–33 New Zealand

7th/8th Match

- Spain 14–31 Fiji

Plate final: 5th/6th Match

- Canada 19–24 New Zealand (AET)

Group C

Nation	Won	Drawn	Lost	For	Against
Australia	3	0	0	93	14
England	2	0	1	56	31
Spain	1	0	2	40	52
Japan	0	0	3	12	104

- Australia 26–7 Spain
- England 35–0 Japan
- Australia 43–0 Japan
- England 14–7 Spain
- Australia 24–7 England
- Spain 26–12 Japan

Bowl Semi Finals (9th-12th)

- Ireland 7–29 Brazil
- Japan 15–14 United States

11th/12th Match

- Ireland 24–31 United States

Bowl final:9th/10th Match

- Brazil 0–13 Japan

Quarter-finals (1st-8th)

- Russia 24–0 Spain
- Fiji 12–19 France
- Australia 15–12 New Zealand
- Canada 12–17 England

Cup Semi Finals (1st-4th)

- Russia 19–12 England
- Australia 26–0 France

3rd/4th place

- England 10–5 France (AET)

Cup Final: 1st/2nd place

- Russia 12–31 Australia

=== International Invitational ===
Group A

Nation	Won	Drawn	Lost	For	Against
Maple Leafs	3	0	0	108	7
South Africa	2	0	1	75	19
Belgium	1	0	2	27	93
Tabusoro Angels Inter	0	0	3	12	103

- South Africa 7–19 Maple Leafs
- Belgium 27–12 Tabusoro Angels Inter
- Maple Leafs 41–0 Belgium
- Tabusoro Angels Inter 0–28 South Africa
- Belgium 0–40 South Africa
- Tabusoro Angels Inter 0–48 Maple Leafs

Group B

Nation	Won	Drawn	Lost	For	Against
France Development	3	0	0	137	7
Wales	2	0	1	67	48
West Coast Vikings	0	1	2	10	77
Tuks	0	1	2	20	102

- Wales 33–10 Tuks
- France Development 40–0 West Coast Vikings
- Tuks 0–59 France Development
- West Coast Vikings 0–27 Wales
- France Development 38–7 Wales
- West Coast Vikings 10–10 Tuks

Bowl semi-finals (9th-12th)

- West Coast Vikings 10–7 Tabusoro Angels Inter
- Kenya 19–12 Tuks

Bowl final: 9th/10th Match

- Kenya 12–10 West Coast Vikings

Group C

Nation	Won	Drawn	Lost	For	Against
GB Select	3	0	0	109	17
Tokyo Phoenix	2	0	1	46	83
Colombia	1	0	2	37	53
Kenya	0	0	3	36	75

- GB Select 33–10 Tokyo Phoenix
- Colombia 15–5 Kenya
- Tokyo Phoenix 17–12 Colombia
- Kenya 7–31 GB Select
- Colombia 10–31 GB Select
- Kenya 24–29 Tokyo Phoenix

Cup Quarter Finals (1st-8th)

- France Development 38–0 Belgium
- Wales 5–12 South Africa
- GB Select 31–5 Tokyo Phoenix
- Colombia 15–26 Maple Leafs

Plate Semi Finals (1st-4th)

- Belgium 0–21 Wales
- Tokyo Phoenix 7–14 Colombia

7th/8th place

- Belgium 17–5 Tokyo Phoenix

Plate Final: 5th/6th place

- Wales 31–5 Colombia

Cup Semi Finals (1st-4th)

- France Development 17–7 South Africa
- GB Select 24–17 Maple Leafs

3rd/4th place

- South Africa 26–19 Maple Leafs

Cup Final: 1st/2nd place

- France Development 5–31 GB Select

== See also ==
- Dubai Sevens
