= 2014 São Paulo Women's Sevens =

- Women's Sevens Series II
- Host nation: Brazil
- Date: 21–22 February 2014

Cup
- Champion: Australia
- Runner-up: New Zealand
- Third: Canada

Plate
- Winner: Spain
- Runner-up: Russia

Bowl
- Winner: United States
- Runner-up: Brazil

Tournament details
- Matches played: 34

The 2014 São Paulo Sevens is the inaugural São Paulo Sevens tournament, and the third of six tournaments in the 2013–14 IRB Women's Sevens World Series. It was held on February 21 and 22 at Arena Barueri, São Paulo.

== Format ==
The teams were drawn into three pools of four teams each. Each team played everyone in their pool one time. The top two teams from each pool advanced to the Cup/Plate brackets while the top 2 third place teams competed in the Cup/Plate. The rest of the teams from each group went to the Bowl brackets.

== Teams ==
A total of twelve teams will compete: The nine "core" teams, and three invited teams.

Core Teams

Invited Teams

- Australia
- Brazil
- Canada
- England
- Ireland
- New Zealand
- Russia
- Spain
- United States
- Netherlands
- Argentina
- Japan

== Pool Stage ==
Key to colours in group tables
Teams that advance to the Cup Quarterfinal

=== Pool A ===
Team	Pld	W	D	L	PF	PA	PD	Pts
New Zealand	3	3	0	0	74	19	55	9
England	3	2	0	1	62	33	29	7
United States	3	1	0	2	32	36	-5	5
Ireland	3	0	0	3	7	87	-80	3

21 February 2014
14:30

New Zealand	36 - 0	Ireland
	Report

Arena Barueri, São Paulo

21 February 2014
14:52

England	19 - 5	United States
	Report

Arena Barueri, São Paulo

21 February 2014
17:14

New Zealand	17 - 5	United States
	Report

Arena Barueri, São Paulo

21 February 2014
17:36

England	29 - 7	Ireland
	Report

Arena Barueri, São Paulo

21 February 2014
19:58

United States	22 - 0	Ireland
	Report

Arena Barueri, São Paulo

21 February 2014
20:20

New Zealand	21 - 14	England
	Report

Arena Barueri, São Paulo

=== Pool B ===
Team	Pld	W	D	L	PF	PA	PD	Pts
Australia	3	3	0	0	96	7	89	9
Russia	3	2	0	1	46	34	12	7
Japan	3	1	0	2	44	41	3	5
Argentina	3	0	0	3	0	104	-104	3

21 February 2014
15:58

Australia	38 - 0	Argentina
	Report

Arena Barueri, São Paulo

21 February 2014
16:20

Russia	17 - 0	Japan
	Report

Arena Barueri, São Paulo

21 February 2014
18:42

Australia	24 - 7	Japan
	Report

Arena Barueri, São Paulo

21 February 2014
19:04

Russia	29 - 0	Argentina
	Report

Arena Barueri, São Paulo

21 February 2014
21:26

Japan	37 - 0	Argentina
	Report

Arena Barueri, São Paulo

21 February 2014
21:48

Australia	34 - 0	Russia
	Report

Arena Barueri, São Paulo

=== Pool C ===
Team	Pld	W	D	L	PF	PA	PD	Pts
Canada	3	2	0	1	83	40	43	7
Spain	3	2	0	1	54	43	11	7
Netherlands	3	2	0	1	37	36	1	7
Brazil	3	0	0	3	26	81	-55	3

21 February 2014
15:14

Spain	21 - 5	Brazil
	Report

Arena Barueri, São Paulo

21 February 2014
15:36

Canada	17 - 5	Netherlands
	Report

Arena Barueri, São Paulo

21 February 2014
17:58

Canada	40 - 7	Brazil
	Report

Arena Barueri, São Paulo

21 February 2014
18:20

Spain	5 - 12	Netherlands
	Report

Arena Barueri, São Paulo

21 February 2014
20:42

Brazil	14 - 20	Netherlands
	Report

Arena Barueri, São Paulo

21 February 2014
21:04

Canada	26 - 28	Spain
	Report

Arena Barueri, São Paulo

== Knockout stage ==
=== Bowl ===
Semi-finals
22 February - 15:58 - Arena Barueri, São Paulo
United States	35
Argentina	0
22 February - 16:20 - Arena Barueri, São Paulo
Brazil	30
Ireland	0

Final
22 February - 17:36 - Arena Barueri, São Paulo
United States	35
Brazil	30
11th Place
22 February - 16:34 - Arena Barueri, São Paulo
Argentina	12
Ireland	17

=== Plate ===
Semi-finals
22 February - 17:36 - Arena Barueri, São Paulo
Japan	5
Russia	10
22 February - 17:58 - Arena Barueri, São Paulo
Netherlands	0
Spain	19

Final
22 February - 20:42 - Arena Barueri, São Paulo
Russia	0
Spain	5
7th Place
22 February - 20:20 - Arena Barueri, São Paulo
Japan	13
Netherlands	5

=== Cup ===
Quarter-finals
22 February - 14:30 - Arena Barueri, São Paulo
Australia	27
Japan	0
22 February - 14:52 - Arena Barueri, São Paulo
England	12
Russia	0
22 February - 15:14 - Arena Barueri, São Paulo
New Zealand	35
Netherlands	7
22 February - 15:36 - Arena Barueri, São Paulo
Canada	22
Spain	0

Semi-finals
22 February - 18:20 - Arena Barueri, São Paulo
Australia	31
England	0
22 February - 18:42 - Arena Barueri, São Paulo
New Zealand	21
Canada	17

Final
22 February - 21:34 - Arena Barueri, São Paulo
Australia	24
New Zealand	12
Third place
22 February - 18:38 - Arena Barueri, São Paulo
England	0
Canada	26
