= 2013–14 IRB Women's Sevens World Series =

World Rugby Women's Sevens Series II
- Hosts: United Arab Emirates; United States; Brazil; China; Netherlands
- Date: 28 Nov 2013 – 17 May 2014

Final positions
- Champions: New Zealand
- Runners-up: Australia

Series details
- Top try scorer: (Australia) Emilee Cherry (33 tries)
- Top point scorer: (Australia) Emilee Cherry (195 points)

The 2013–14 IRB Women's Sevens World Series was the second edition of the IRB Women's Sevens World Series, organized by the IRB annual series of tournaments for women's national teams in rugby sevens.

In August 2013, the IRB announced that the season would consist of six tournaments - in Dubai, the Atlanta suburb of Kennesaw, Georgia, São Paulo, Guangzhou and Amsterdam - played from November 2013 to May 2014, with a sixth tournament to be announced later. However, the sixth tournament never materialized, and official literature referred to São Paulo as stop two of five. The number of teams in each of the events was set at twelve, nine of which participated in all competitions of the season, while others might be identified by elimination or rankings of the six regions reporting to the IRB .

== The competition ==
As with the men's counterpart, the series winner was to be the team that collected the most points throughout the season, based on individual tournament finishes.

The number of "core teams" that participate in all series events increased to nine for the 2013–14 series, up from six in the inaugural series. The eight quarterfinalists in the 2013 Rugby World Cup Sevens were granted core team status for 2013–14:

- Australia
- Canada
- England
- Ireland
- New Zealand
- Russia
- Spain
- United States

In addition, the IRB announced that Brazil will be an invited core team for at least the 2013–14 series in an initiative to jump-start women's rugby development in the country, as Brazil was hosting the 2016 Summer Olympics.

The remaining participants in each tournament were to be determined through regional qualifiers.

=== Events ===
2013–14 Itinerary
Leg	Venue	Date	Winner
Dubai	The Sevens, Dubai	28–29 November 2013	Australia
United States	Fifth Third Bank Stadium, Kennesaw, Georgia (Atlanta)	15–16 February 2014	New Zealand
Brazil	Arena Barueri, São Paulo	21–22 February 2014	Australia
China	Guangzhou University Town Stadium, Guangzhou	5–6 April 2014	New Zealand
Netherlands	NRCA Stadium, Amsterdam	16–17 May 2014	New Zealand

== Points schedule ==
The season championship will be determined by points earned in each tournament. The scoring system, similar to that used in the men's IRB Sevens, was announced shortly before the season kicked off.

- Cup Winner - 20
- Cup Runner Up - 18
- 3rd Place - 16
- Cup Semi Finalist - 14
- Plate Winner - 12
- Plate Runner Up - 10
- Winner 7th/8th play-off - 8
- Loser 7th/8th play-off - 6
- Bowl Winner - 4
- Bowl Runner Up - 3
- Winner 11th/12th play-off - 2
- Loser 11th/12th play-off - 1

Should teams finish equal on series points at the end of the season, the tiebreakers are the same as those in the men's series:

1. Overall scoring differential in the season.
2. Total try count in the season.
3. If neither produces a winner, the teams are tied.

== Stadings ==
Final standings for the 2013–14 series.

2013–14 IRB Women's Sevens World – Series II
Pos.	Event Team	Dubai	Atlanta	São Paulo	Guangzhou	Amsterdam	Points total
1st place, gold medalist(s)	New Zealand	18	20	18	20	20	96
2nd place, silver medalist(s)	Australia	20	16	20	18	18	92
3rd place, bronze medalist(s)	Canada	14	18	16	16	16	80
4	England	12	8	14	12	14	60
5	Russia	16	14	10	8	10	58
6	Spain	10	10	12	8	1	41
7	United States	8	12	4	2	12	38
8	France	3	–	–	10	8	21
9	Fiji	4	–	–	14	–	18
10	Brazil	6	2	3	1	6	18
11	Japan	–	6	8	–	–	14
12	Netherlands	–	4	6	–	4	14
13	Ireland	2	1	2	4	2	11
14	China	–	3	–	3	–	6
15	South Africa	–	–	–	–	3	3
16	Argentina	–	–	1	–	–	1
17	Tunisia	1	–	–	–	–	1

Legend
Gold	Event Champions
Silver	Event Runner-ups
Bronze	Event Third place finishers
Green	Qualified as a core team for women's rugby sevens World Series III
No colour	Did not directly qualify for women's rugby sevens World Series III

== Tournaments ==
=== Dubai ===
Event	Winners	Score	Finalists	Semifinalists
Cup	Australia	35-27	New Zealand	Russia (Third); Canada
Plate	England	17-10	Spain	United States (Seventh); Brazil
Bowl	Fiji	14-10	France	Ireland (Eleventh); Tunisia

=== Atlanta ===
Event	Winners	Score	Finalists	Semifinalists
Cup	New Zealand	36-0	Canada	Australia (Third); Russia
Plate	United States	22-0	Spain	England (Seventh); Japan
Bowl	Netherlands	33-0	China	Brazil (Eleventh); Ireland

=== São Paulo ===
Event	Winners	Score	Finalists	Semifinalists
Cup	Australia	24-12	New Zealand	Canada (Third); England
Plate	Spain	5-0	Russia	Japan (Seventh); Netherlands
Bowl	United States	21-0	Brazil	Ireland (Eleventh); Argentina

=== Guangzhou ===
Event	Winners	Score	Finalists	Semifinalists
Cup	New Zealand	26-12	Australia	Canada (Third); Fiji
Plate	England	19-0	France	Spain (Seventh); Russia
Bowl	Ireland	17-7	China	United States (Eleventh); Brazil

=== Amsterdam ===
Event	Winners	Score	Finalists	Semifinalists
Cup	New Zealand	29-12	Australia	Canada (Third); England
Plate	United States	27-12	Russia	France (Seventh); Brazil
Bowl	Netherlands	29-7	South Africa	Ireland (Eleventh); Spain
