= 2023 Sydney Women's Sevens =

World Rugby Women's Sevens Series tournament

- Sevens World Series X
- Host nation: Australia
- Date: 27–29 January 2023

Cup
- Champion: New Zealand
- Runner-up: France
- Third: United States

Tournament details
- Matches played: 34

The 2023 Sydney Women's Sevens was the fourth tournament within the 2022–23 World Rugby Women's Sevens Series and was the 2nd edition of the New Zealand Women's Sevens since it began in 2019. It was held on 27, 28 and 29 January 2023 at Allianz Stadium in Sydney, Australia.

== Format ==
The twelve teams at each tournament were drawn into three pools of four teams each. A round-robin was held for each pool, where every team played each of the other three in their pool once. The top two teams from each pool, plus the two best third-placed on comparative pool standings, advanced to the Cup quarterfinals to compete for tournament honours. The other teams from each pool went to the challenge playoffs for ninth to twelfth place.

== Teams ==
Eleven core teams participated in the tournament along with one invited team, Papua New Guinea.

Core Teams

- Australia
- Brazil
- Canada
- Fiji
- France
- Great Britain
- Ireland
- Japan
- New Zealand
- Spain
- United States

Invited Team

- Papua New Guinea

== Pool stage ==
Points system: Teams were awarded 3 points for a win, 2 points for a draw and 1 point for a loss. No bonus points were awarded.

Key to colours in group tables
Teams that advanced to the cup quarterfinals
Teams that advanced to the 9th place semifinals

=== Pool A ===
Pos	Team	Pld	W	D	L	PF	PA	PD	Pts
1	New Zealand	3	3	0	0	104	26	+78	9
2	France	3	2	0	1	79	41	+38	7
3	Japan	3	1	0	2	72	51	+21	5
4	Papua New Guinea	3	0	0	3	7	144	–137	3

27 January

Japan	5–24	France

Allianz Stadium, Sydney

27 January

New Zealand	48–0	Papua New Guinea

Allianz Stadium, Sydney

27 January

Japan	55–0	Papua New Guinea

Allianz Stadium, Sydney

27 January

New Zealand	29–14	France

Allianz Stadium, Sydney

28 January

France	41–7	Papua New Guinea

Allianz Stadium, Sydney

28 January

New Zealand	27–12	Japan

Allianz Stadium, Sydney

=== Pool B ===
Pos	Team	Pld	W	D	L	PF	PA	PD	Pts
1	Fiji	3	2	0	1	56	31	+25	7
2	Great Britain	3	2	0	1	46	22	+24	7
3	United States	3	2	0	1	40	39	+1	7
4	Canada	3	0	0	3	24	67	–43	3

27 January

Great Britain	17–5	Fiji

Allianz Stadium, Sydney

27 January

United States	14–12	Canada

Allianz Stadium, Sydney

27 January

Great Britain	19–5	Canada

Allianz Stadium, Sydney

27 January

United States	14–17	Fiji

Allianz Stadium, Sydney

28 January

Fiji	34–7	Canada

Allianz Stadium, Sydney

28 January

United States	12–10	Great Britain

Allianz Stadium, Sydney

=== Pool C ===
Pos	Team	Pld	W	D	L	PF	PA	PD	Pts
1	Australia	3	3	0	0	117	19	+98	9
2	Ireland	3	2	0	1	47	67	–20	7
3	Brazil	3	1	0	2	55	59	–4	5
4	Spain	3	0	0	3	17	91	–74	3

27 January

Ireland	14–12	Spain

Allianz Stadium, Sydney

27 January

Australia	28–12	Brazil

Allianz Stadium, Sydney

27 January

Ireland	26–12	Brazil

Allianz Stadium, Sydney

27 January

Australia	46–0	Spain

Allianz Stadium, Sydney

28 January

Spain	5–31	Brazil

Allianz Stadium, Sydney

28 January

Australia	43–7	Ireland

Allianz Stadium, Sydney

== Knockout stage ==
=== 9th to 12th playoffs ===
9th place semifinals
28 January – Allianz Stadium
Canada	27
Spain	10
28 January – Allianz Stadium
Brazil	41
Papua New Guinea	0

9th place final
29 January – Allianz Stadium
Canada	24
Brazil	21
11th place final
29 January – Allianz Stadium
Spain	29
Papua New Guinea	0

=== 5th to 8th playoffs ===
5th place Semifinals
29 January – Allianz Stadium
Great Britain	0
Australia	19
29 January – FMG Stadium Waikato
Fiji	40
Japan	7

5th place final
29 January – Allianz Stadium
Australia	36
Fiji	12
7th place final
29 January – Allianz Stadium
Great Britain	21
Japan	5

=== Cup playoffs ===
Quarterfinals
28 January – Allianz Stadium
Great Britain	5
United States	10
28 January – Allianz Stadium
Australia	5
France	10
28 January – Allianz Stadium
Fiji	12
Ireland	26
28 January – Allianz Stadium
New Zealand	27
Japan	12

Semifinals
29 January – Allianz Stadium
United States	7
France	20
29 January – Allianz Stadium
Ireland	0
New Zealand	36

Final
29 January – Allianz Stadium
France	0
New Zealand	35
3rd place final
29 January – Allianz Stadium
United States	12
Ireland	5

== Tournament placings ==
Place	Team	Points
1st place, gold medalist(s)	New Zealand	20
2nd place, silver medalist(s)	France	18
3rd place, bronze medalist(s)	United States	16
4	Ireland	14
5	Australia	12
6	Fiji	10
7	Great Britain	8
8	Japan	6
9	Canada	4
10	Brazil	3
11	Spain	2
12	Papua New Guinea	1

Source: World Rugby

== See also ==
- 2023 Sydney Sevens
- World Rugby Women's Sevens Series
- 2022–23 World Rugby Women's Sevens Series

World Sevens Series X
Preceded by 2023 New Zealand Women's Sevens	2023 Sydney Women's Sevens	Succeeded by 2023 Canada Women's Sevens
New Zealand Women's Sevens
Preceded by 2020 Sydney Women's Sevens	2023 Sydney Women's Sevens Women's Sevens	Succeeded by 2024 Australia Sevens
