= South Africa Women's Sevens =

Annual women's rugby sevens tournament

- Sport: Rugby sevens
- Inaugural season: 2019
- Number of teams: 12
- Holders: New Zealand
- Most titles: New Zealand (3 times)

The South Africa Women's Sevens is an annual women's rugby sevens tournament announced by World Rugby as one of the stops on the world circuit, with the inaugural competition held in December 2019. The women's event is hosted at Cape Town Stadium as part of an integrated tournament alongside the existing men's event. Most destinations on the World Rugby Women's Sevens Series are geographically paired for travel reasons, with South Africa hosting the second tournament of the season following the series opener at Dubai.

== Champions ==
Year	Venue	Cup final			Placings			Refs
		Winner	Score	Runner-up	Third	Fourth	Fifth	
2019	Cape Town Stadium	New Zealand	17–7	Australia	Canada	France	United States	
World Series tournaments planned for Cape Town were cancelled in 2020 and 2021, due to impacts of the COVID-19 pandemic.
2022	Cape Town Stadium	New Zealand	31–14	Australia	United States	Ireland	France	
2023	Cape Town Stadium	Australia	29–26	France	New Zealand	United States	Fiji	
2024	Cape Town Stadium	New Zealand	26–12	United States	France	Australia	Canada	

== See also ==
- South Africa Sevens (for men's teams)
