= 2014–15 World Rugby Women's Sevens Series =

World Rugby Women's Sevens Series III
- Hosts: United Arab Emirates; Brazil; United States; Canada; England; Netherlands
- Date: 4 Dec 2014 – 23 May 2015

Final positions
- Champions: New Zealand
- Runners-up: Canada

Series details
- Top try scorer: (New Zealand) Portia Woodman (52)
- Top point scorer: (New Zealand) Portia Woodman

The 2014–15 World Rugby Women's Sevens Series was the third edition of the World Rugby Women's Sevens Series (formerly the IRB Women's Sevens World Series), an annual series of tournaments organised by World Rugby for women's national teams in rugby sevens. The series also doubled as an Olympic qualifier for the first time ever.

For the second time in the series' history, the number of events increased. The first series in 2012–13 featured four events. The 2013–14 series was initially announced with six events, but only five were actually scheduled and played. This season's series included six events.

As in previous seasons, the number of teams in each of the events was set at 12; however, the number of core teams that participate in all series events increased to 11.

Also for the first time, the women's series held a core team qualifying tournament at Hong Kong, similar to that held in the men's HSBC Sevens World Series.

== The competition ==
As in the case of the men's counterpart, the series winner was the team that collected the most points throughout the season, based on individual tournament finishes.

The number of "core teams" that participate in all series events increased to 11 for the 2014–15 series, up from six in the inaugural 2012–13 series and nine in 2013–14. The top seven finishers in the 2013–14 series were granted core team status for 2014–15:

- Australia
- Canada
- England
- New Zealand
- Russia
- Spain
- United States

Four more core teams were determined in a qualifying tournament:

- China
- Fiji
- France
- South Africa

=== Events ===
2014–15 Itinerary
Leg	Venue	Dates	Winner
Dubai	The Sevens, Dubai	4–5 December 2014	New Zealand
Brazil	Arena Barueri, São Paulo	7–8 February 2015	New Zealand
United States	Fifth Third Bank Stadium, Kennesaw, Georgia (Atlanta)	14–15 March 2015	New Zealand
Canada	Westhills Stadium, Langford, British Columbia (Victoria)	18–19 April 2015	New Zealand
London	Twickenham Stoop and Twickenham Stadium, London	15–16 May 2015	Australia
Netherlands	NRCA Stadium, Amsterdam	22–23 May 2015	Canada

=== Qualifying tournament ===
The core team qualifying tournament was held at Shek Kip Mei Stadium in Hong Kong on 12–13 September 2014.

The qualifier began with a single round-robin pool stage, with teams divided into three four-team pools. The top two teams from each pool, plus the top two third-place finishers, advanced to a knockout stage. The four quarterfinal winners qualified as core teams for 2014–15.

1. Fiji (qualified)
2. France (qualified)
3. China (qualified)
4. South Africa (qualified)
5. Japan
6. Brazil
7. Netherlands
8. Portugal
9. Hong Kong
10. Argentina
11. Kenya
12. Mexico

== Points schedule ==
The season championship was to be determined by points earned in each tournament. The scoring system was the same used in the previous year's series.

- Cup Winner - 20
- Cup Runner Up - 18
- 3rd Place - 16
- Cup Semi Finalist - 14
- Plate Winner - 12
- Plate Runner Up - 10
- Winner 7th/8th play-off - 8
- Loser 7th/8th play-off - 6
- Bowl Winner - 4
- Bowl Runner Up - 3
- Winner 11th/12th play-off - 2
- Loser 11th/12th play-off - 1

== Standings ==
Final standings for the 2014–15 series:

2014–15 World Rugby Women's Sevens – Series III
Pos.	Event Team	Dubai	São Paulo	Atlanta	Langford	London	Amsterdam	Points total
1st place, gold medalist(s)	New Zealand	20	20	20	20	16	12	108
2nd place, silver medalist(s)	Canada	16	16	16	10	18	20	96
3rd place, bronze medalist(s)	Australia	18	18	12	8	20	18	94
4	England^{a}	12	12	8	16	12	16	76
5	United States	8	10	18	12	14	14	76
6	France	14	14	10	14	10	10	72
7	Russia	6	8	14	18	8	6	60
8	Fiji	10	4	4	6	4	4	32
9	Spain	2	3	3	4	6	8	26
10	Brazil	4	6	6	3	1	–	20
11	China	1	2	2	2	3	3	13
12	South Africa	3	1	1	1	2	1	9
13	Netherlands	–	–	–	–	–	2	2

Legend
Event Medalists
Gold	Event Champions
Silver	Event Runner-ups
Bronze	Event Third place finishers
Qualification for the 2015–16 World Rugby Women's Sevens Series
Green	Core team in 2014–15 and re-qualified as a core team for the 2015–16
No colour	Not a core team
Qualification for the 2016 Olympic Sevens
Automatically qualified (host country Brazil)
Qualified to the 2016 Olympic Sevens as one of the four highest placed eligible teams from the 2018–19 series.

^a By agreement between the three unions on the island of Great Britain (England, Scotland, Wales), England, as highest finisher among those nations in the 2013–14 series, represents Great Britain for the purposes of Olympic qualification.

== Tournaments ==
=== Dubai ===
Event	Winners	Score	Finalists	Semifinalists
Cup	New Zealand	19–17	Australia	Canada (3rd); France
Plate	England	19–12	Fiji	United States (7th); Russia
Bowl	Brazil	17–7	South Africa	Spain (11th); China

=== São Paulo ===
Event	Winners	Score	Finalists	Semifinalists
Cup	New Zealand	17–10	Australia	Canada (3rd); France
Plate	England	14–5	United States	Russia (7th); Brazil
Bowl	Fiji	17–12	Spain	China (11th); South Africa

=== Atlanta ===
Event	Winners	Score	Finalists	Semifinalists
Cup	New Zealand	50–12	United States	Canada (3rd); Russia
Plate	Australia	26–17	France	England (7th); Brazil
Bowl	Fiji	17–12	Spain	China (11th); South Africa

=== Victoria ===
Event	Winners	Score	Finalists	Semifinalists
Cup	New Zealand	29–10	Russia	England (3rd); France
Plate	United States	19–12	Canada	Australia (7th); Fiji
Bowl	Spain	14–12	Brazil	China (11th); South Africa

=== London ===
Event	Winners	Score	Finalists	Semifinalists
Cup	Australia	20–17	Canada	New Zealand (3rd); United States
Plate	England	19–0	France	Russia (7th); Spain
Bowl	Fiji	31–0	China	South Africa (11th); Brazil

=== Amsterdam ===
Event	Winners	Score	Finalists	Semifinalists
Cup	Canada	20–17	Australia	England (3rd); United States
Plate	New Zealand	35–5	France	Spain (7th); Russia
Bowl	Fiji	38–12	China	Netherlands (11th); South Africa
