= 2022 South Africa Women's Sevens =

World Rugby Women's Sevens Series tournament

2022 South Africa Men's Sevens
- Sevens World Series X
- Host nation: South Africa
- Date: 9–11 December 2022

Cup
- Champion: New Zealand
- Runner-up: Australia
- Third: United States

Tournament details
- Matches played: 34

The 2022 South Africa Women's Sevens was the second tournament within the 2022–23 World Rugby Women's Sevens Series and was the 2nd edition of the South Africa Women's Sevens since it began in 2019. It was held on 9, 10 and 11 December 2022 at DHL Stadium in Cape Town, South Africa.

== Format ==
The twelve teams at each tournament were drawn into three pools of four teams each. A round-robin was held for each pool, where every team played each of the other three in their pool once. The top two teams from each pool, plus the two best third-placed on comparative pool standings, advanced to the Cup quarterfinals to compete for tournament honours. The other teams from each pool went to the challenge playoffs for ninth to twelfth place.

== Teams ==
Eleven core teams participated in the tournament along with one invited team, South Africa.

Core Teams

- Australia
- Brazil
- Canada
- Fiji
- France
- Great Britain
- Ireland
- Japan
- New Zealand
- Spain
- United States

Invited Team

- South Africa

== Pool stage ==
Points system: Teams were awarded 3 points for a win, 2 points for a draw and 1 point for a loss. No bonus points were awarded.

Key to colours in group tables
Teams that advanced to the cup quarterfinals
Teams that advanced to the 9th place semifinals

=== Pool A ===
Pos	Team	Pld	W	D	L	PF	PA	PD	Pts
1	Australia	3	3	0	0	119	0	+119	9
2	Ireland	3	2	0	1	57	41	+16	7
3	Spain	3	1	0	2	29	85	–56	5
4	South Africa	3	0	0	3	14	93	–79	3

9 December
00:00

Ireland	33–12	Spain

DHL Stadium, Cape Town

9 December
00:00

Australia	52–0	South Africa

DHL Stadium, Cape Town

9 December
00:00

Ireland	24–0	South Africa

DHL Stadium, Cape Town

9 December
00:00

Australia	38–0	Spain

DHL Stadium, Cape Town

10 December
00:00

Spain	17–14	South Africa

DHL Stadium, Cape Town

10 December
00:00

Australia	29–0	Ireland

DHL Stadium, Cape Town

=== Pool B ===
Pos	Team	Pld	W	D	L	PF	PA	PD	Pts
1	New Zealand	3	3	0	0	76	35	+41	9
2	Fiji	3	2	0	1	71	46	+25	7
3	Great Britain	3	1	0	2	46	43	+3	5
4	Brazil	3	0	0	3	22	91	–69	3

9 December
00:00

Fiji	19–10	Great Britain

DHL Stadium, Cape Town

9 December
00:00

New Zealand	31–7	Brazil

DHL Stadium, Cape Town

9 December
00:00

Fiji	31–10	Brazil

DHL Stadium, Cape Town

9 December
00:00

New Zealand	19–7	Great Britain

DHL Stadium, Cape Town

10 December
00:00

Great Britain	29–5	Brazil

DHL Stadium, Cape Town

10 December
00:00

New Zealand	26–21	Fiji

DHL Stadium, Cape Town

=== Pool C ===
Pos	Team	Pld	W	D	L	PF	PA	PD	Pts
1	France	3	2	1	0	76	38	+38	8
2	United States	3	2	0	1	50	52	–2	7
3	Canada	3	1	1	1	47	55	–8	5
4	Japan	3	0	0	3	38	66	–28	3

9 December
00:00

France	19–19	Canada

DHL Stadium, Cape Town

9 December
00:00

United States	19–14	Japan

DHL Stadium, Cape Town

9 December
00:00

France	26–12	Japan

DHL Stadium, Cape Town

9 December
00:00

United States	24–7	Canada

DHL Stadium, Cape Town

10 December
00:00

Canada	21–12	Japan

DHL Stadium, Cape Town

10 December
00:00

United States	7–31	France

DHL Stadium, Cape Town

== Knockout stage ==
=== 9th to 12th playoffs ===
9th place semifinals
11 December – DHL Stadium
Japan	12
Brazil	17
11 December – DHL Stadium
Spain	17
South Africa	12

9th place final
11 December – DHL Stadium
Brazil	17
Spain	5
11th place final
11 December – DHL Stadium
Japan	15
South Africa	5

=== 5th to 8th playoffs ===
5th place Semifinals
11 December – DHL Stadium
Canada	14
France	19 (a.e.t.)
11 December – DHL Stadium
Fiji	14
Great Britain	19

5th place final
11 December – DHL Stadium
France	36
Great Britain	28
7th place final
11 December – DHL Stadium
Canada	12
Fiji	26

=== Cup playoffs ===
Quarterfinals
10 December – DHL Stadium
New Zealand	50
Canada	5
10 December – DHL Stadium
France	10
Ireland	12
10 December – DHL Stadium
Fiji	7
United States	10
10 December – DHL Stadium
Australia	38
Great Britain	0

Semifinals
11 December – DHL Stadium
New Zealand	14
Ireland	7
11 December – DHL Stadium
United States	12
Australia	33

Final
11 December – DHL Stadium
New Zealand	31
Australia	14
3rd place final
11 December – DHL Stadium
Ireland	12
United States	20

== Tournament placings ==
Place	Team	Points
1st place, gold medalist(s)	New Zealand	20
2nd place, silver medalist(s)	Australia	18
3rd place, bronze medalist(s)	United States	16
4	Ireland	14
5	France	12
6	Great Britain	10
7	Fiji	8
8	Canada	6
9	Brazil	4
10	Spain	3
11	Japan	2
12	South Africa	1

Source: World Rugby

== Players ==
Dream Team
Forwards	Backs
(South Africa) Ricardo Duarttee (South Africa) Branco du Preez (South Africa) Siviwe Soyizwapi	(United States) Perry Baker (Ireland) Harry McNulty (Ireland) Mark Roche; Akuila Rokolisoa

== See also ==
- 2022 South Africa Sevens
- World Rugby Women's Sevens Series
- 2022–23 World Rugby Women's Sevens Series

World Sevens Series X
Preceded by 2022 Dubai Women's Sevens	2022 South Africa Women's Sevens	Succeeded by 2023 New Zealand Women's Sevens
South Africa Women's Sevens
Preceded by 2019 South Africa Women's Sevens	2022 South Africa Women's Sevens	Succeeded by 2023 South Africa Sevens
