= Grêmio Barueri Futebol =

Association football club in Brazil

Grêmio Barueri
- Full name: Grêmio Barueri Futebol Ltda
- Nickname: Abelhão
- Founded: March 26, 1989; 37 years ago
- Ground: Arena Barueri
- Capacity: 31,452
- Website: www.grbarueri.com.br
Home colours	Away colours

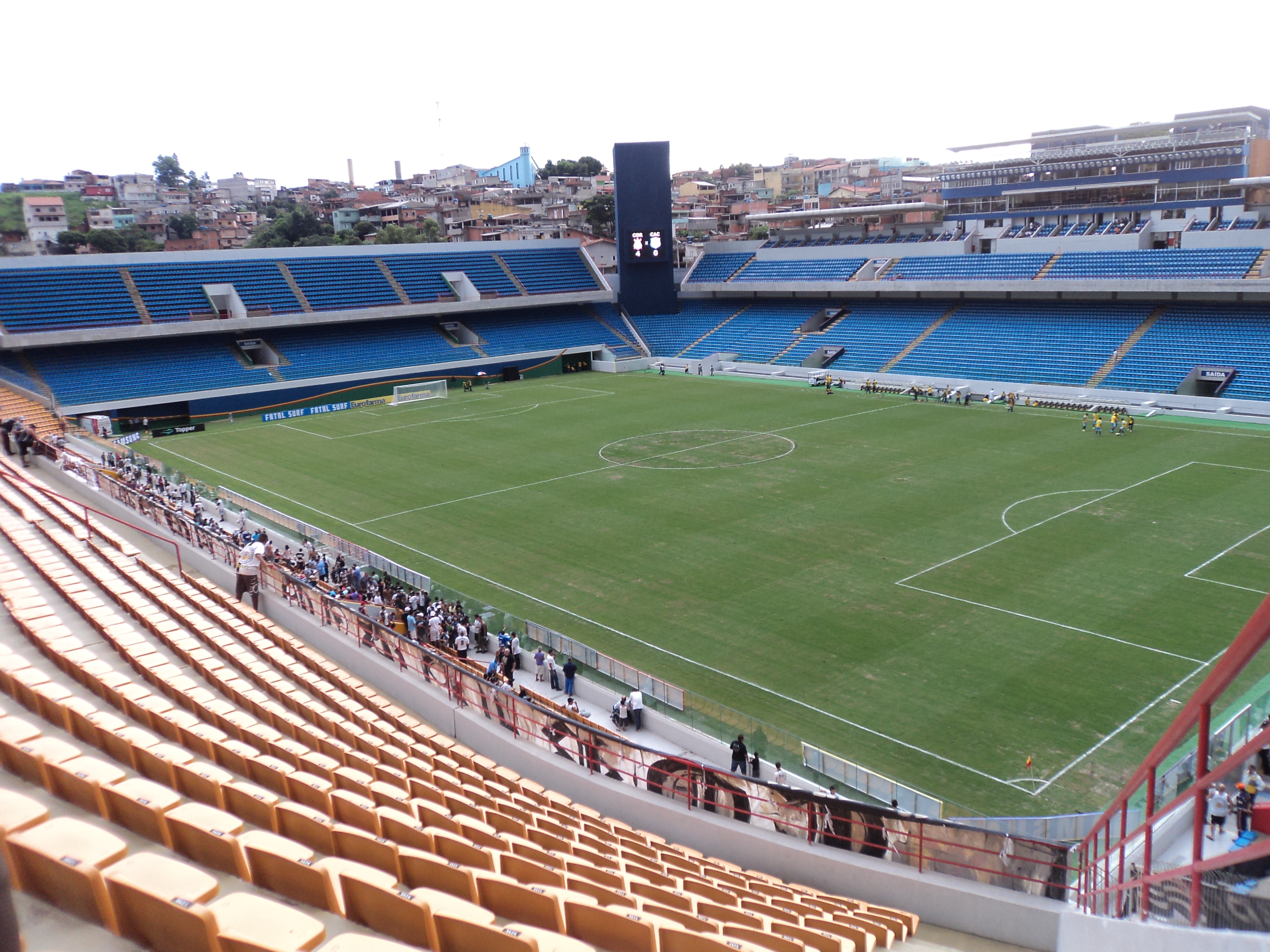
Arena Barueri

Grêmio Barueri Futebol Ltda., generally known as Grêmio Barueri, or just as Barueri, is a Brazilian football club from Barueri, São Paulo state. The club was formerly known as Grêmio Recreativo Barueri and Grêmio Prudente Futebol Ltda.

The club was founded in 1989, in the city of Barueri, on the north-western outskirts of metropolitan São Paulo. The club and the city of Barueri failed to reach an agreement about training facilities and the concession of the Arena, causing the club to move to Presidente Prudente in the countryside, about 600 km from the state capital. The move was formalized by the end of February 2010, and it was announced that a change of insignia and kit would follow within the next weeks. The club moved back to Barueri in 2011.

The club's home stadium is the Arena Barueri, which has a maximum capacity of about 31,452 spectators.

== History ==
The club was founded on 26 March 1989 as Grêmio Recreativo Barueri to represent Barueri in several different sports.

Barueri had a sponsorship from Bandeirantes Bank from September, 1997 to June 1998. The club changed sponsors to Mackenzie/Microcamp from August 1998 to May 1999. In 1998 Barueri won the São Paulo State Men's Basketball Championship. Some time later, the club signed a partnership with Vasco da Gama, of Rio de Janeiro.

Barueri signed a sponsorship with Roma Incorporadora in 2000. During this period, the club, which was named Roma Barueri at the time, won the Campeonato Paulista Under-20 in 2000, and the Copa São Paulo de Juniores in 2001, beating São Paulo in the final.

Barueri badge (2002–2006)

The club professionalized its football team in 2001, and competed in the Campeonato Paulista Série B3, finishing in the 14th position.

Barueri won the Campeonato Paulista Série A3 in 2005, beating Palmeiras B in the final.

The club won the Campeonato Paulista Série A2 in 2006, beating Sertãozinho in the final, and winning promotion to the following year's Campeonato Paulista first division. In the same year, Barueri played in the Campeonato Brasileiro Série C for the first time, finishing in fourth place, thus being promoted to the following year's Série B. A fourth-place finish in 2008 allowed the team to be promoted to Série A, the top level championship, in the following year.

The club was renamed to Grêmio Prudente Futebol Ltda. on 26 February 2010, after the name change was approved on 12 February by the board of directors and Presidente Prudente's city hall. The logo was changed to reflect the new name.

Prudente was relegated to the 2011 Série B on 14 November 2010, after being defeated 2–1 by Atlético Paranaense at the Arena da Baixada, in Curitiba city. The club was also relegated to the Campeonato Paulista Série A2 after a weak performance in the 2011 Campeonato Paulista. Soon after that, a group of Barueri business men bought the club, moving it back to the city, and renamed the club Grêmio Barueri Futebol Ltda.

== Honours ==
=== Official tournaments ===
State
Competitions	Titles	Seasons
Campeonato Paulista Série A2	1	2006
Campeonato Paulista Série A3	1	2005

=== Others tournaments ===
==== State ====
- Campeonato Paulista do Interior (1): 2008

=== Runners-up ===
- Campeonato Paulista Segunda Divisão (1): 2003

=== Youth team ===
- Copa São Paulo de Futebol Júnior (1): 2001

== Other sports honours ==
=== Basketball ===
- Campeonato Paulista Estadual de Basquete
  - Winners (1): 1998
- Jogos Abertos do Interior
  - Winners (1): 1998

=== Volleyball ===
- Campeonato Paulista de Volleyball Masculino
  - Winners (1) 1992

== Stadium ==
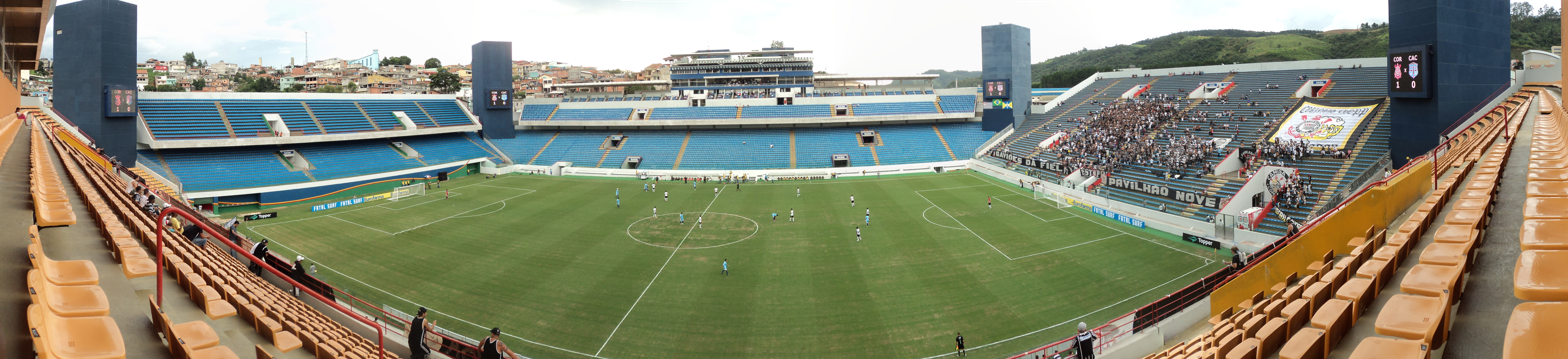
Panoramic view of Arena Barueri

Since its inauguration on 26 June 2007, Barueri's home stadium has been the Arena Barueri, with an initial capacity of 17,000 and a final stadium capacity of 40,000. Currently the stadium holds 35,000 spectators.

Barueri's previous home was the Estádio Orlando Novelli, opened in 1996, with a maximum capacity of 5,000.

During the temporary relocation to President Prudente the club's home stadium was Estádio Eduardo José Farah, which has a maximum capacity of 44,414. The club moved to the Arena Barueri after returning to Barueri in 2011.

== Nickname ==
The club is usually known by the acronym GRB.

== Club colors ==
The club colors are blue, red and yellow.

== Other sports ==
Besides football, Prudente also had other sports sections, such as basketball, volleyball, gymnastics, futsal, karate, judo, bocha and athletics.

== Notable players ==
- Bruno Caboclo (born 1995), basketball player in the Israeli Basketball Premier League, formerly in the NBA
