= 2022 Dubai Women's Sevens =

World Rugby Women’s Sevens Series tournament

2022 Dubai Sevens
- Sevens World Series XXIV
- Host nation: UAE
- Date: 2–4 December 2022

Cup
- Champion: Australia
- Runner-up: New Zealand
- Third: United States

Tournament details
- Matches played: 34

The 2022 Dubai Women's Sevens was the first tournament within the 2022–23 World Rugby Women's Sevens Series and was the 22nd international edition and the 52nd overall of the Dubai Sevens since it began in 1970. It was held on 2, 3 and 4 December 2022 at The Sevens Stadium in Dubai, United Arab Emirates.

== Format ==
The twelve teams at each tournament were drawn into three pools of four teams each. A round-robin was held for each pool, where every team played each of the other three in their pool once. The top two teams from each pool, plus the two best third-placed on comparative pool standings, advanced to the Cup quarterfinals to compete for tournament honours. The other teams from each pool went to the challenge playoffs for ninth to twelfth place.

== Teams ==
Eleven core teams participated in the tournament along with one invited team, China.

Core Teams

- Australia
- Brazil
- Canada
- Fiji
- France
- Great Britain
- Ireland
- Japan
- New Zealand
- Spain
- United States

Invited Team

- China

== Pool stage ==
Points system: Teams were awarded 3 points for a win, 2 points for a draw and 1 point for a loss. No bonus points were awarded.

Key to colours in group tables
| Teams that advanced to the cup quarterfinals |
| Teams that advanced to the 9th place semifinals |

=== Pool A ===
| Pos | Team | Pld | W | D | L | PF | PA | PD | Pts |
|---|---|---|---|---|---|---|---|---|---|
| 1 | Australia | 3 | 3 | 0 | 0 | 98 | 19 | +79 | 9 |
| 2 | United States | 3 | 2 | 0 | 1 | 41 | 43 | −2 | 7 |
| 3 | Canada | 3 | 1 | 0 | 2 | 33 | 55 | −20 | 5 |
| 4 | China | 3 | 0 | 0 | 3 | 24 | 79 | –55 | 3 |

2 December
00:00

| United States | 12–7 | Canada |

The Sevens Stadium, Dubai

2 December
00:00

| Australia | 36–7 | China |

The Sevens Stadium, Dubai

3 December
00:00

| United States | 17–7 | China |

The Sevens Stadium, Dubai

3 December
00:00

| Australia | 33–0 | Canada |

The Sevens Stadium, Dubai

3 December
00:00

| Australia | 29–12 | United States |

The Sevens Stadium, Dubai

3 December
00:00

| Canada | 26–10 | China |

The Sevens Stadium, Dubai

=== Pool B ===
| Pos | Team | Pld | W | D | L | PF | PA | PD | Pts |
|---|---|---|---|---|---|---|---|---|---|
| 1 | New Zealand | 3 | 3 | 0 | 0 | 85 | 29 | +56 | 9 |
| 2 | France | 3 | 2 | 0 | 1 | 72 | 59 | +13 | 7 |
| 3 | Great Britain | 3 | 1 | 0 | 2 | 71 | 52 | +19 | 5 |
| 4 | Brazil | 3 | 0 | 0 | 3 | 19 | 107 | –88 | 3 |

2 December
00:00

| France | 34–7 | Brazil |

The Sevens Stadium, Dubai

2 December
00:00

| New Zealand | 19–12 | Great Britain |

The Sevens Stadium, Dubai

3 December
00:00

| New Zealand | 35–5 | Brazil |

The Sevens Stadium, Dubai

3 December
00:00

| France | 26–21 | Great Britain |

The Sevens Stadium, Dubai

3 December
00:00

| Great Britain | 38–7 | Brazil |

The Sevens Stadium, Dubai

3 December
00:00

| France | 12–31 | New Zealand |

The Sevens Stadium, Dubai

=== Pool C ===
| Pos | Team | Pld | W | D | L | PF | PA | PD | Pts |
|---|---|---|---|---|---|---|---|---|---|
| 1 | Ireland | 3 | 3 | 0 | 0 | 76 | 48 | +28 | 9 |
| 2 | Spain | 3 | 2 | 0 | 1 | 61 | 42 | +19 | 7 |
| 3 | Fiji | 3 | 1 | 0 | 2 | 64 | 59 | −5 | 5 |
| 4 | Japan | 3 | 0 | 0 | 3 | 45 | 97 | −20 | 3 |

2 December
00:00

| Ireland | 21–7 | Spain |

The Sevens Stadium, Dubai

2 December
00:00

| Fiji | 33–14 | Japan |

The Sevens Stadium, Dubai

3 December
00:00

| Ireland | 31–24 | Japan |

The Sevens Stadium, Dubai

3 December
00:00

| Fiji | 14–21 | Spain |

The Sevens Stadium, Dubai

3 December
00:00

| Fiji | 17–24 | Ireland |

The Sevens Stadium, Dubai

3 December
00:00

| Japan | 33–7 | France |

The Sevens Stadium, Dubai

== Knockout stage ==
=== Cup playoffs ===
9th place semifinals
4 December – The Sevens Stadium
Japan | 12
China | 7
4 December – The Sevens Stadium
Canada | 36
Brazil | 0

9th place final
4 December – The Sevens Stadium
Japan | 10
Canada | 15
11th place final
4 December – The Sevens Stadium
China | 31
Brazil | 21

== Cup ==
=== 5th to 8th playoffs ===
5th place Semifinals
4 December – The Sevens Stadium
Great Britain | 12
Ireland | 21
4 December – The Sevens Stadium
Spain | 5
Fiji | 26

5th place final
4 December – The Sevens Stadium
Ireland | 12
Fiji | 28
7th place final
4 December – The Sevens Stadium
Great Britain | 10
Spain | 14

=== Cup playoffs ===
Quarterfinals
3 December – The Sevens Stadium
New Zealand | 22
Great Britain | 5
3 December – The Sevens Stadium
Ireland | 0
United States | 5
3 December – The Sevens Stadium
France | 14
Spain | 5
3 December – The Sevens Stadium
Australia | 38
Fiji | 21

Semifinals
4 December – The Sevens Stadium
New Zealand | 36
United States | 0
4 December – The Sevens Stadium
France | 5
Australia | 38

Final
4 December – The Sevens Stadium
New Zealand | 19
Australia | 26
3rd place final
4 December – The Sevens Stadium
United States | 21
France | 19

== Tournament placings ==
| Place | Team | Points |
|---|---|---|
| 1st place, gold medalist(s) | Australia | 20 |
| 2nd place, silver medalist(s) | New Zealand | 18 |
| 3rd place, bronze medalist(s) | United States | 16 |
| 4 | France | 14 |
| 5 | Fiji | 12 |
| 6 | Ireland | 10 |
| 7 | Spain | 8 |
| 8 | Great Britain | 6 |
| 9 | Canada | 4 |
| 10 | Japan | 3 |
| 11 | China | 2 |
| 12 | Brazil | 1 |

Source: World Rugby

== Players ==
Dream Team
| Forwards | Backs |
|---|---|
| (South Africa) Ricardo Duarttee (South Africa) Branco du Preez (South Africa) Siviwe Soyizwapi | (United States) Perry Baker (Ireland) Harry McNulty (Ireland) Mark Roche; Akuila Rokolisoa |

== See also ==
- 2022 Dubai Sevens
- World Rugby Women's Sevens Series
- 2022–23 World Rugby Women's Sevens Series

World Sevens Series X
| Preceded by none (first event) | 2022 Dubai Women's Sevens Sevens | Succeeded by 2022 South Africa Women's Sevens |
Dubai Women's Sevens
| Preceded by 2021 Dubai Women's Sevens | 2022 Dubai Sevens | Succeeded by 2023 Dubai Women's Sevens |
