= 2023 New Zealand Women's Sevens =

World Rugby Women's Sevens Series tournament

- Sevens World Series X
- Host nation: New Zealand
- Date: 21–22 January 2023

Cup
- Champion: New Zealand
- Runner-up: United States
- Third: Australia

Tournament details
- Matches played: 34

The 2023 New Zealand Women's Sevens was the third tournament within the 2022–23 World Rugby Women's Sevens Series and was the second edition of the New Zealand Women's Sevens since it began in 2019. It was held on 21 and 22 January 2023 at FMG Stadium Waikato in Hamilton, New Zealand.

== Format ==
The twelve teams at each tournament were drawn into three pools of four teams each. A round-robin was held for each pool, where every team played each of the other three in their pool once. The top two teams from each pool, plus the two best third-placed on comparative pool standings, advanced to the Cup quarterfinals to compete for tournament honours. The other teams from each pool went to the challenge playoffs for ninth to twelfth place.

== Teams ==
Eleven core teams participated in the tournament along with one invited team, Papua New Guinea.

Core Teams

- Australia
- Brazil
- Canada
- Fiji
- France
- Great Britain
- Ireland
- Japan
- New Zealand
- Spain
- United States

Invited Team

- Papua New Guinea

== Pool stage ==
Points system: Teams were awarded 3 points for a win, 2 points for a draw and 1 point for a loss. No bonus points were awarded.

Key to colours in group tables
Teams that advanced to the cup quarterfinals
Teams that advanced to the 9th place semifinals

=== Pool A ===
Pos	Team	Pld	W	D	L	PF	PA	PD	Pts
1	New Zealand	3	3	0	0	105	0	+105	9
2	Great Britain	3	2	0	1	50	39	+11	7
3	Fiji	3	1	0	2	69	14	+55	5
4	Papua New Guinea	3	0	0	3	0	144	–144	3

21 January

Great Britain	14–19	Fiji

FMG Stadium Waikato, Hamilton

21 January

New Zealand	58–0	Papua New Guinea

FMG Stadium Waikato, Hamilton

21 January

Great Britain	36–0	Papua New Guinea

FMG Stadium Waikato, Hamilton

21 January

New Zealand	27–0	Fiji

FMG Stadium Waikato, Hamilton

21 January

Fiji	50–0	Papua New Guinea

FMG Stadium Waikato, Hamilton

21 January

New Zealand	20–0	Great Britain

FMG Stadium Waikato, Hamilton

=== Pool B ===
Pos	Team	Pld	W	D	L	PF	PA	PD	Pts
1	Australia	3	3	0	0	102	21	+81	9
2	France	3	1	1	1	38	67	–29	6
3	Japan	3	1	0	2	43	59	–16	5
4	Canada	3	0	1	2	26	62	–36	4

21 January

France	12–12	Canada

FMG Stadium Waikato, Hamilton

21 January

Australia	26–14	Japan

FMG Stadium Waikato, Hamilton

21 January

France	26–12	Japan

FMG Stadium Waikato, Hamilton

21 January

Australia	33–7	Canada

FMG Stadium Waikato, Hamilton

21 January

Canada	7–17	Japan

FMG Stadium Waikato, Hamilton

21 January

Australia	43–0	France

FMG Stadium Waikato, Hamilton

=== Pool C ===
Pos	Team	Pld	W	D	L	PF	PA	PD	Pts
1	United States	3	3	0	0	87	19	+68	9
2	Ireland	3	2	0	1	66	25	+41	7
3	Brazil	3	1	0	2	41	86	–45	5
4	Spain	3	0	0	3	34	98	–64	3

21 January

United States	31–12	Spain

FMG Stadium Waikato, Hamilton

21 January

Ireland	28–5	Brazil

FMG Stadium Waikato, Hamilton

21 January

Ireland	31–5	Spain

FMG Stadium Waikato, Hamilton

21 January

United States	41–0	Brazil

FMG Stadium Waikato, Hamilton

21 January

Spain	17–36	Brazil

FMG Stadium Waikato, Hamilton

21 January

United States	15–7	Ireland

FMG Stadium Waikato, Hamilton

== Knockout stage ==
=== 9th to 12th playoffs ===
9th place semifinals
22 January – FMG Stadium Waikato
Brazil	41
Papua New Guinea	7
22 January – FMG Stadium Waikato
Canada	0
Spain	7

9th place final
22 January – FMG Stadium Waikato
Brazil	12
Spain	17
11th place final
22 January – FMG Stadium Waikato
Canada	44
Papua New Guinea	5

=== 5th to 8th playoffs ===
5th place Semifinals
22 January – FMG Stadium Waikato
Great Britain	12
Fiji	0
22 January – FMG Stadium Waikato
France	12
Japan	19

5th place final
22 January – FMG Stadium Waikato
Great Britain	14
Japan	10
7th place final
22 January – FMG Stadium Waikato
Fiji	5
France	34

=== Cup playoffs ===
Quarterfinals
22 January – FMG Stadium Waikato
Australia	38
Great Britain	0
22 January – FMG Stadium Waikato
United States	27
Fiji	7
22 January – FMG Stadium Waikato
France	7
Ireland	24
22 January – FMG Stadium Waikato
New Zealand	43
Japan	12

Semifinals
22 January – FMG Stadium Waikato
Australia	7
United States	10
22 January – FMG Stadium Waikato
Ireland	0
New Zealand	32

Final
22 January – FMG Stadium Waikato
United States	7
New Zealand	33
3rd place final
22 January – FMG Stadium Waikato
Australia	33
Ireland	17

== Tournament placings ==
Place	Team	Points
1st place, gold medalist(s)	New Zealand	20
2nd place, silver medalist(s)	United States	18
3rd place, bronze medalist(s)	Australia	16
4	Ireland	14
5	Great Britain	12
6	Japan	10
7	France	8
8	Fiji	6
9	Spain	4
10	Brazil	3
11	Canada	2
12	Papua New Guinea	1

Source: World Rugby

== See also ==
- 2023 New Zealand Sevens
- World Rugby Women's Sevens Series
- 2022–23 World Rugby Women's Sevens Series

World Sevens Series X
Preceded by 2022 South Africa Women's Sevens	2023 Hamilton Women's Sevens	Succeeded by 2023 Sydney Women's Sevens
New Zealand Women's Sevens
Preceded by 2020 New Zealand Women's Sevens	2023 New Zealand Women's Sevens	Succeeded by None (last event)
