= 2022–23 World Rugby Women's Sevens Series =

2022–23 World Rugby Women's Sevens
- Series X
- Hosts: United Arab Emirates; South Africa; New Zealand; Australia; Canada; Hong Kong; France
- Date: 2 December 2022 – 14 May 2023

Final positions
- Champions: New Zealand
- Runners-up: Australia
- Third: United States

Series details
- Top try scorer: Maddison Levi (58 tries)
- Top point scorer: Maddison Levi (286 pts)

The 2022–23 World Rugby Women's Sevens Series was the tenth edition of the global circuit for women's national rugby sevens teams, organised by World Rugby. New Zealand won the series at the last event in Toulouse, taking out six of the seven events on the tour to claim their seventh World Series title with Australia and the United States placing second and third, respectively. The series doubled as a qualifier for the 2024 Olympic Sevens, so those three teams along with host country France, who finished fourth in the series, and Ireland, who finished fifth, all gained direct qualifying berths for the women's tournament held in Paris in 2024.

== Core teams ==
The core teams qualified to participate in all tournaments for 2022–23 were:

- Australia
- Brazil
- Canada
- Fiji
- France
- (United Kingdom) Great Britain
- Ireland
- Japan
- New Zealand
- Spain
- United States

Japan was promoted to core team status by winning the 2022 Challenger Series. A combined Great Britain team replaced England as a core team for the series.

== Tour venues ==
The schedule for the series was:

2022–23 Itinerary
Leg	Stadium	City	Dates	Winner
Dubai	The Sevens Stadium	Dubai	2–3 December 2022	Australia
South Africa	DHL Stadium	Cape Town	9–11 December 2022	New Zealand
New Zealand	FMG Stadium Waikato	Hamilton	21–22 January 2023	New Zealand
Australia	Allianz Stadium	Sydney	27–29 January 2023	New Zealand
Canada	BC Place	Vancouver	3–5 March 2023	New Zealand
Hong Kong	Hong Kong Stadium	Hong Kong	31 March – 2 April 2023	New Zealand
France	Stade Ernest-Wallon	Toulouse	12–14 May 2023	New Zealand

== Standings ==
The final standings after completion of the seven tournaments of the series are shown in the table below.

The points awarded to teams at each tournament, as well as the overall season totals, are shown. Gold indicates the event champions. Silver indicates the event runner-ups. Bronze indicates the event third place finishers.

Final standings for the 2022–23 series:

2022–23 World Rugby – Women's Series X
Pos.	Event Team	Dubai	Cape Town	Hamilton	Sydney	Vancouver	Hong Kong	Toulouse	Points total	Points difference
1	New Zealand	18	20	20	20	20	20	20	138	+1093
2	Australia	20	18	16	12	18	18	16	118	+898
3	United States	16	16	18	16	16	8	18	108	+62
4	France	14	12	8	18	14	12	14	92	+192
5	Ireland	10	14	14	14	6	6	10	74	–22
6	Fiji	12	8	6	10	12	14	6	68	+51
7	(United Kingdom) Great Britain	6	10	12	8	8	16	8	68	–36
8	Japan	3	2	10	6	4	3	12	40	–183
9	Canada	4	6	2	4	10	10	3	39	–147
10	Spain	8	3	4	2	3	4	4	28	–359
11	Brazil	1	4	3	3	2	2	1	16	–483
12	China	2	—	—	—	—	—	—	2	–50
14	Poland	—	—	—	—	—	—	2	2	–131
13	Papua New Guinea	—	—	1	1	—	—	—	2	–424
15	South Africa	—	1	—	—	—	—	—	1	–94
16	Hong Kong	—	—	—	—	—	1	—	1	–132
17	Colombia	—	—	—	—	1	—	—	1	–192

Source: World Rugby

Legend
Event Medalists
Gold	Event Champions
Silver	Event Runner-ups
Bronze	Event Third place finishers
Qualification for the 2024 Olympic Sevens
Qualified as one of the four highest-placed eligible teams in the 2022–23 World Sevens Series
Automatically qualified (host country France)
Qualification for the 2023–24 World Sevens Series
No colour	Core team and re-qualified as a core team for the 2023–24 World Sevens Series
Yellow	Invited team

== Placings summary ==
Tallies of top-four placings in tournaments during the 2022–23 series, by team:

Team	(gold) Gold	(silver) Silver	(bronze) Bronze	Fourth	Total
New Zealand	6	1	—	—	7
Australia	1	3	2	—	6
United States	—	2	4	—	6
France	—	1	—	3	4
(United Kingdom) Great Britain	—	—	1	—	1
Ireland	—	—	—	3	3
Fiji	—	—	—	1	1

== Player statistics ==
=== Scoring ===
Tries scored
Rank	Player	Tries
1	Maddison Levi	57
2	Michaela Blyde	43
3	Charlotte Caslick	31
4	Amee-Leigh Murphy Crowe	30
4	Stacey Waaka	30
6	Reapi Ulunisau	28
7	Faith Nathan	25
8	Portia Woodman	24
8	Wakaba Hara	24
10	Ana Maria Naimasi	23

Updated: 14 May 2023

Points scored
Rank	Player	Points
1	Maddison Levi	285
2	Tyla Nathan-Wong	247
3	Michaela Blyde	215
4	Lucy Mulhall	183
5	Reapi Ulunisau	170
6	Ana Maria Naimasi	165
7	Charlotte Caslick	155
8	Stacey Waaka	150
8	Amee-Leigh Murphy Crowe	150
10	Michiyo Suda	130

Updated: 14 May 2023

=== Performance ===
Impact Player winner
Event	Player	Points
Dubai	Amee-Leigh Murphy Crowe	71
Cape Town	Camille Grassineau	81
Hamilton	Beibhinn Parsons	72
Sydney	Reapi Ulunisau	76
Vancouver	Reapi Ulunisau	86
Hong Kong	Séraphine Okemba	86
Toulouse	Joanna Grisez	69

Total Impact Player points
Rank	Player	T	B	O	C	Total
1	Reapi Ulunisau	78	28	76	152	466
2	Ana Maria Naimasi	89	23	62	150	432
3	Charlotte Caslick	142	33	21	134	417
4	Kristi Kirshe	75	22	28	147	344
5	Eve Higgins	67	20	21	174	343
6	Maddison Levi	53	49	14	114	342
7	Lucy Mulhall	92	12	17	176	338
8	Jorja Miller	69	27	35	98	318
9	Amee-Leigh Murphy Crowe	64	31	11	133	312
10	Michaela Blyde	52	42	10	106	304

Key: T: Tackles (1 pt), B: Line breaks (3 pts), O: Offloads (2 pts), C: Carries (1 pt)

Updated: 14 May 2023

== Tournaments ==
=== Dubai ===
Event	Winner	Score	Finalist
Cup	Australia	26–19	New Zealand
Bronze	United States	21–19	France
5th Place	Fiji	28–12	Ireland
7th Place	Spain	14–10	Great Britain
9th Place	Canada	15–10	Japan
11th Place	China	31–21	Brazil

=== Cape Town ===
Event	Winner	Score	Finalist
Cup	New Zealand	31–14	Australia
Bronze	United States	20–12	Ireland
5th Place	France	36–28	Great Britain
7th Place	Fiji	26–12	Canada
9th Place	Brazil	17–5	Spain
11th Place	Japan	15–5	South Africa

=== Hamilton ===
Event	Winner	Score	Finalist
Cup	New Zealand	33–7	United States
Bronze	Australia	33–17	Ireland
5th Place	Great Britain	14–10	Japan
7th Place	France	34–5	Fiji
9th Place	Spain	17–12	Brazil
11th Place	Canada	44–5	Papua New Guinea

=== Sydney ===
Event	Winner	Score	Finalist
Cup	New Zealand	35–0	France
Bronze	United States	12–5	Ireland
5th Place	Australia	36–12	Fiji
7th Place	Great Britain	21–5	Japan
9th Place	Canada	24–21	Brazil
11th Place	Spain	29–0	Papua New Guinea

=== Vancouver ===
Event	Winners	Score	Finalists
Cup	New Zealand	19–12	Australia
Bronze	United States	19–7	France
5th Place	Fiji	22–17	Canada
7th place	(United Kingdom) Great Britain	25–5	Ireland
9th place	Japan	17–10	Spain
11th Place	Brazil	26–12	Colombia

=== Hong Kong ===
Event	Winners	Score	Finalists
Cup	New Zealand	26–17	Australia
Bronze	(United Kingdom) Great Britain	22–19	Fiji
5th place	France	22–12	Canada
7th Place	United States	15–14	Ireland
9th place	Spain	26–17	Japan
11th Place	Brazil	21–10	Hong Kong

=== Toulouse ===
Event	Winners	Score	Finalists
Cup	New Zealand	19–14	United States
Bronze	Australia	33–7	France
5th place	Japan	14–0	Ireland
7th Place	(United Kingdom) Great Britain	22–17	Fiji
9th place	Spain	15–14	Canada
11th Place	Poland	19–7	Brazil

== See also ==
- 2022–23 World Rugby Sevens Series (for men's teams)
