= 2014 China Women's Sevens =

Rugby sevens tournament

- Women's Sevens Series II
- Host nation: China
- Date: 5–6 April 2014

Cup
- Champion: New Zealand
- Runner-up: Australia
- Third: Canada

Plate
- Winner: England
- Runner-up: France

Bowl
- Winner: Ireland
- Runner-up: China

Tournament details
- Matches played: 34

The 2014 China Women's Sevens was the second edition of the China Women's Sevens tournament, and the fourth of five tournaments in the 2013–14 IRB Women's Sevens World Series.

New Zealand won the tournament after beating Australia in the final.

== Format ==
The teams were drawn into three pools of four teams each. Each team played everyone in their pool one time. The top two teams from each pool advanced to the Cup/Plate brackets while the top 2 third place teams will also compete in the Cup/Plate. The rest of the teams from each group went to the Bowl brackets.

== Teams ==
A total of twelve teams will compete: The nine "core" teams, and three invited teams.

Core Teams
- Australia
- Canada
- England
- Ireland
- New Zealand
- Russia
- Spain
- United States
- Brazil

Invited Teams

- China
- Fiji
- France

== Pool Stage ==
Key to colours in group tables
Teams that advance to the Cup Quarterfinal

=== Pool A ===
Team	Pld	W	D	L	PF	PA	PD	Pts
New Zealand	3	3	0	0	109	5	104	9
Spain	3	2	0	1	29	40	-11	7
Brazil	3	1	0	2	29	62	-33	5
China	3	0	0	3	24	84	-60	3

New Zealand	33–0	Brazil

Spain	12–7	China

New Zealand	50–0	China

Spain	12–7	Brazil

New Zealand	26–5	Spain

Brazil	22–17	China

=== Pool B ===
Team	Pld	W	D	L	PF	PA	PD	Pts
Australia	3	2	0	1	86	20	66	7
Fiji	3	2	0	1	56	43	13	7
England	3	2	0	1	48	46	2	7
Ireland	3	0	0	3	26	107	-81	3

Australia	50–0	Ireland

England	12–15	Fiji

Australia	24–5	Fiji

England	21–19	Ireland

Australia	10–15	England

Ireland	7–36	Fiji

=== Pool C ===
Team	Pld	W	D	L	PF	PA	PD	Pts
Canada	3	2	1	0	66	26	40	8
Russia	3	2	1	0	50	34	16	8
France	3	2	0	1	33	50	-17	5
United States	3	0	0	3	29	68	-39	3

Canada	35–7	United States

Russia	12–7	France

Canada	19–7	France

Russia	19–10	United States

Canada	12–12	Russia

United States	12–14	France

== Knockout stage ==
=== Bowl ===
Semi-finals
6 April - 11:28 - Guangzhou University Town Stadium, Guangzhou
Brazil	0
Ireland	15
6 April - 11:50 - Guangzhou University Town Stadium, Guangzhou
United States	7
China	17

Final
6 April - 14:56 - Guangzhou University Town Stadium, Guangzhou
Ireland	17
China	7
11th Place
6 April - 14:34 - Guangzhou University Town Stadium, Guangzhou
Brazil	0
United States	31

=== Plate ===
Semi-finals
6 April - 13:06 - Guangzhou University Town Stadium, Guangzhou
France	10
Russia	5
6 April - 13:28 - Guangzhou University Town Stadium, Guangzhou
Spain	0
England	26

Final
6 April - 16:20 - Guangzhou University Town Stadium, Guangzhou
France	0
England	19
7th Place
6 April - 15:58 - Guangzhou University Town Stadium, Guangzhou
Russia	13
Spain	5

=== Cup ===
Quarter-finals
6 April - 10:00 - Guangzhou University Town Stadium, Guangzhou
New Zealand	42
France	7
6 April - 10:22 - Guangzhou University Town Stadium, Guangzhou
Russia	7
Fiji	12
6 April - 10:44 - Guangzhou University Town Stadium, Guangzhou
Australia	12
Spain	5
6 April - 11:06 - Guangzhou University Town Stadium, Guangzhou
Canada	19
England	10

Semi-finals
6 April - 13:50 - Guangzhou University Town Stadium, Guangzhou
New Zealand	26
Fiji	0
6 April - 14:12 - Guangzhou University Town Stadium, Guangzhou
Australia	5
Canada	0

Final
6 April - 17:12 - Guangzhou University Town Stadium, Guangzhou
New Zealand	26
Australia	12
Third place
6 April - 16:50 - Guangzhou University Town Stadium, Guangzhou
Fiji	0
Canada	26
