= 2015 Netherlands Women's Sevens =

- Women's Sevens Series III
- Host nation: Netherlands
- Date: 22–23 May 2015

Cup
- Champion: Canada
- Runner-up: Australia
- Third: England

Plate
- Winner: New Zealand
- Runner-up: France

Bowl
- Winner: Fiji
- Runner-up: China

Tournament details
- Matches played: 34

The 2015 Netherlands Women's Sevens was the third edition of the Netherlands Women's Sevens as part of the Women's World Series. It was held over the weekend of 22–23 May 2015 at NRCA Stadium, Amsterdam, as the sixth and final event of the 2014–15 series.

== Format ==
The teams are drawn into three pools of four teams each. Each team plays every other team in their pool once. The top two teams from each pool advance to the Cup/Plate brackets along with the top two third place teams. The rest of the teams go to the Bowl bracket.

== Teams ==
- Australia
- Canada
- China
- England
- Fiji
- France
- Netherlands
- New Zealand
- Russia
- South Africa
- Spain
- United States

== Pool stage ==
Key to colours in group tables
Teams that advance to the Cup Quarterfinal

=== Pool A ===
Team	Pld	W	D	L	PF	PA	PD	Pts
United States	3	3	0	0	96	26	+70	9
New Zealand	3	2	0	1	68	41	+27	7
South Africa	3	0	1	2	33	76	–43	4
Fiji	3	0	1	2	33	87	–54	4

22 May 2015
13:04

New Zealand	32–0	Fiji

NRCA Stadium, Amsterdam

22 May 2015
13:26

United States	26–7	South Africa

NRCA Stadium, Amsterdam

22 May 2015
15:48

New Zealand	31–7	South Africa

NRCA Stadium, Amsterdam

22 May 2015
16:10

United States	36–14	Fiji

NRCA Stadium, Amsterdam

22 May 2015
18:32

New Zealand	5–34	United States

NRCA Stadium, Amsterdam

22 May 2015
18:54

Fiji	19–19	South Africa

NRCA Stadium, Amsterdam

=== Pool B ===
Team	Pld	W	D	L	PF	PA	PD	Pts
Australia	3	3	0	0	101	14	+87	9
England	3	2	0	1	103	29	+74	7
Russia	3	1	0	2	41	76	–35	5
China	3	0	0	3	7	133	–126	3

22 May 2015
12:20

Australia	29–7	Russia

NRCA Stadium, Amsterdam

22 May 2015
12:42

England	56–0	China

NRCA Stadium, Amsterdam

22 May 2015
15:04

Australia	48–0	China

NRCA Stadium, Amsterdam

22 May 2015
15:26

England	40–5	Russia

NRCA Stadium, Amsterdam

22 May 2015
17:48

Australia	24–7	England

NRCA Stadium, Amsterdam

22 May 2015
18:10

Russia	29–7	China

NRCA Stadium, Amsterdam

=== Pool C ===
Team	Pld	W	D	L	PF	PA	PD	Pts
Canada	3	3	0	0	89	15	+74	9
Spain	3	2	0	1	28	41	–13	7
France	3	1	0	2	22	38	–16	5
Netherlands	3	0	0	3	22	67	–45	3

22 May 2015
13:48

Canada	29–0	Spain

NRCA Stadium, Amsterdam

22 May 2015
14:10

France	12–5	Netherlands

NRCA Stadium, Amsterdam

22 May 2015
16:32

Canada	34–10	Netherlands

NRCA Stadium, Amsterdam

22 May 2015
16:54

France	5–7	Spain

NRCA Stadium, Amsterdam

22 May 2015
19:16

Canada	26–5	France

NRCA Stadium, Amsterdam

22 May 2015
19:38

Spain	21–7	Netherlands

NRCA Stadium, Amsterdam

== Knockout stage ==
=== Bowl ===
Semi-finals
23 May 2013 - 11:28 - NRCA Stadium, Amsterdam
South Africa	12
China	21
23 May 2013 - 11:50 - NRCA Stadium, Amsterdam
Fiji	15
Netherlands	5

Final
23 May 2013 - NRCA Stadium, Amsterdam
China	12
Fiji	38
11th Place
23 May 2013 - NRCA Stadium, Amsterdam
South Africa	7
Netherlands	17

=== Plate ===
Semi-finals
23 May 2013 - NRCA Stadium, Amsterdam
Russia	5
New Zealand	31
23 May 2013 - NRCA Stadium, Amsterdam
Spain	19
France	26

Final
23 May 2013 - NRCA Stadium, Amsterdam
New Zealand	35
France	5
7th Place
23 May 2013 - NRCA Stadium, Amsterdam
Russia	7
Spain	19

=== Cup ===
Quarter-finals
23 May 2013 - 10:00 - NRCA Stadium, Amsterdam
Australia	31
Russia	0
23 May 2013 - 10:22 - NRCA Stadium, Amsterdam
England	17
New Zealand	14
23 May 2013 - 10:44 - NRCA Stadium, Amsterdam
United States	38
Spain	10
23 May 2013 - 11:06 - NRCA Stadium, Amsterdam
Canada	33
France	0

Semi-finals
23 May 2013 - NRCA Stadium, Amsterdam
Australia	26
England	0
23 May 2013 - NRCA Stadium, Amsterdam
United States	14
Canada	19

Final
23 May 2013 - 17:26 - NRCA Stadium, Amsterdam
Australia	17
Canada	20
Third place
23 May 2013 - 17:04 - NRCA Stadium, Amsterdam
England	15
United States	14
