= 2015 London Women's Sevens =

- Women's Sevens Series III
- Host nation: England
- Date: 15–16 May 2015

Cup
- Champion: Australia
- Runner-up: Canada
- Third: New Zealand

Plate
- Winner: England
- Runner-up: France

Bowl
- Winner: Fiji
- Runner-up: China

Tournament details
- Matches played: 34

The 2015 London Women's Sevens was the third edition of the London Women's Sevens, and the first tournament hosted in England to be a part of the Women's World Series. It was held over the weekend of 15–16 May 2015 at Twickenham Stadium and The Stoop in London, as the fifth event of the 2014–15 series.

== Format ==
The teams are drawn into three pools of four teams each. Each team plays every other team in their pool once. The top two teams from each pool advance to the Cup/Plate brackets along with the top two third place teams. The rest of the teams go to the Bowl bracket.

== Teams ==
- Australia
- Brazil
- Canada
- China
- England
- Fiji
- France
- New Zealand
- Russia
- South Africa
- Spain
- United States

== Pool stage ==
Key to colours in group tables
| Teams that advance to the Cup Quarterfinal |

=== Pool A ===
| Team | Pld | W | D | L | PF | PA | PD | Pts |
|---|---|---|---|---|---|---|---|---|
| New Zealand | 3 | 2 | 0 | 1 | 73 | 19 | +54 | 7 |
| France | 3 | 2 | 0 | 1 | 43 | 34 | +9 | 7 |
| Spain | 3 | 2 | 0 | 1 | 43 | 41 | +2 | 7 |
| Brazil | 3 | 0 | 0 | 3 | 19 | 84 | −65 | 3 |

15 May 2015
12:00

| New Zealand | 34–0 | Brazil |

The Stoop, London

15 May 2015
12:22

| France | 12–5 | Spain |

The Stoop, London

15 May 2015
14:44

| New Zealand | 15–19 | Spain |

The Stoop, London

15 May 2015
15:06

| France | 31–5 | Brazil |

The Stoop, London

15 May 2015
17:28

| Brazil | 14–19 | Spain |

The Stoop, London

15 May 2015
17:50

| New Zealand | 24–0 | France |

The Stoop, London

=== Pool B ===
| Team | Pld | W | D | L | PF | PA | PD | Pts |
|---|---|---|---|---|---|---|---|---|
| Canada | 3 | 3 | 0 | 0 | 90 | 12 | +78 | 9 |
| England | 3 | 2 | 0 | 1 | 49 | 50 | −1 | 7 |
| Russia | 3 | 1 | 0 | 2 | 64 | 52 | +12 | 5 |
| South Africa | 3 | 0 | 0 | 3 | 24 | 113 | −89 | 3 |

15 May 2015
13:28

| Canada | 14–12 | Russia |

The Stoop, London

15 May 2015
13:50

| England | 28–7 | South Africa |

The Stoop, London

15 May 2015
16:12

| Canada | 45–0 | South Africa |

The Stoop, London

15 May 2015
16:34

| England | 21–12 | Russia |

The Stoop, London

15 May 2015
18:56

| Russia | 40–17 | South Africa |

The Stoop, London

15 May 2015
19:18

| Canada | 31–0 | England |

The Stoop, London

=== Pool C ===
| Team | Pld | W | D | L | PF | PA | PD | Pts |
|---|---|---|---|---|---|---|---|---|
| Australia | 3 | 2 | 1 | 0 | 58 | 17 | +41 | 8 |
| United States | 3 | 2 | 1 | 0 | 76 | 38 | +38 | 8 |
| Fiji | 3 | 1 | 0 | 2 | 38 | 51 | −13 | 5 |
| China | 3 | 0 | 0 | 3 | 19 | 85 | −66 | 3 |

15 May 2015
12:44

| Australia | 15–5 | Fiji |

The Stoop, London

15 May 2015
13:06

| United States | 40–7 | China |

The Stoop, London

15 May 2015
15:28

| Australia | 31–0 | China |

The Stoop, London

15 May 2015
15:50

| United States | 24–19 | Fiji |

The Stoop, London

15 May 2015
18:12

| Fiji | 14–12 | China |

The Stoop, London

15 May 2015
18:34

| Australia | 12–12 | United States |

The Stoop, London

== Knockout stage ==
=== Bowl ===
Semi-finals
16 May 2015 – 11:58 – The Stoop, London
Fiji | 38
South Africa | 5
16 May 2015 – 12:20 – The Stoop, London
Brazil | 17
China | 19

Final
16 May 2015 – 16:00 – The Stoop, London
Fiji | 31
China | 0
11th place
16 May 2015 – 14:58 – The Stoop, London
South Africa | 14
Brazil | 7

=== Plate ===
Semi-finals
16 May 2015 – 13:30 – The Stoop, London
Russia | 14
France | 22
16 May 2015 – 13:52 – The Stoop, London
England | 10
Spain | 0

Final
16 May 2015 – 16:47 – The Stoop, London
France | 0
England | 19
7th place
16 May 2015 – 16:25 – The Stoop, London
Russia | 19
Spain | 7

=== Cup ===
Quarter-finals
16 May 2015 – 10:30 – The Stoop, London
Canada | 26
Russia | 5
16 May 2015 – 10:52 – The Stoop, London
United States | 19
France | 12
16 May 2015 – 11:14 – The Stoop, London
New Zealand | 24
England | 12
16 May 2015 – 11:36 – The Stoop, London
Australia | 19
Spain | 0

Semi-finals
16 May 2015 – 14:14 – The Stoop, London
Canada | 17
United States | 14
16 May 2015 – 14:36 – The Stoop, London
New Zealand | 5
Australia | 24

Final
16 May 2015 – 18:30 – Twickenham, London
Canada | 17
Australia | 20
Third place
16 May 2015 – 18:08 – Twickenham, London
United States | 19
New Zealand | 24
