= 2014 Dubai Women's Sevens =

- Women's Sevens Series III
- Host nation: United Arab Emirates
- Date: 4–5 December 2014

Cup
- Champion: New Zealand
- Runner-up: Australia

Plate
- Winner: Fiji
- Runner-up: England

Bowl
- Winner: Brazil
- Runner-up: South Africa

Tournament details
- Matches played: 34
- Tries scored: 162 (average 4.76 per match)
- Most points: (Canada) Ghislaine Landry
- Most tries: (Russia) Marina Petrova

The 2014 Women's Dubai Sevens was the opening tournament of the 2014–15 World Rugby Women's Sevens Series. It was held over the weekend of 4–5 December 2014 at The Sevens Stadium in Dubai, and was the third edition of the Women's Dubai Sevens as part of the World Rugby Women's Sevens Series.

== Format ==
The teams are drawn into three pools of four teams each. Each team plays every other team in their pool once. The top two teams from each pool advance to the Cup/Plate brackets while the top 2 third place teams also compete in the Cup/Plate. The other teams from each group play-off for the Bowl.

== Teams ==
The participating teams and schedule were announced on 15 October 2014.

- Australia
- Brazil
- Canada
- China
- England
- Fiji
- France
- New Zealand
- Russia
- South Africa
- Spain
- United States

== Match officials ==
The match officials for the 2014 Dubai Sevens are as follows:

- Jesse Beard (New Zealand)
- James Bolabiu (Fiji)
- Sara Cox (England)
- Steve Lee (England)
- Alhambra Nievas (Spain)
- Amy Perrett (Australia)
- Rasta Rasivhenge (South Africa)

== Pool Stage ==
Key to colours in group tables
Teams that advanced to the Cup Quarterfinal

=== Pool A ===
Team	Pld	W	D	L	PF	PA	PD	Pts
New Zealand	3	3	0	0	96	31	65	9
United States	3	2	0	1	97	36	61	7
Russia	3	1	0	2	71	51	20	5
China	3	0	0	3	5	151	−146	3

4 December 2014
11:44

New Zealand	43–0	China
	Report

The Sevens, Dubai

4 December 2014
12:06

Russia	12–17	United States
	Report

The Sevens, Dubai

4 December 2014
14:40

New Zealand	24–19	United States
	Report

The Sevens, Dubai

4 December 2014
15:02

Russia	47–5	China
	Report

The Sevens, Dubai

4 December 2014
17:36

United States	61–0	China
	Report

The Sevens, Dubai

4 December 2014
17:58

New Zealand	29–12	Russia
	Report

The Sevens, Dubai

=== Pool B ===
Team	Pld	W	D	L	PF	PA	PD	Pts
Australia	3	3	0	0	99	10	89	9
France	3	2	0	1	65	31	34	7
South Africa	3	0	1	2	24	77	−53	4
Spain	3	0	1	2	17	87	−70	4

4 December 2014
11:00

Australia	36–0	South Africa
	Report

The Sevens, Dubai

4 December 2014
11:22

Spain	0–31	France
	Report

The Sevens, Dubai

4 December 2014
13:56

Australia	24–10	France
	Report

The Sevens, Dubai

4 December 2014
14:18

Spain	17–17	South Africa
	Report

The Sevens, Dubai

4 December 2014
16:52

France	24–7	South Africa
	Report

The Sevens, Dubai

4 December 2014
17:14

Australia	39–0	Spain
	Report

The Sevens, Dubai

=== Pool C ===
Team	Pld	W	D	L	PF	PA	PD	Pts
England	3	3	0	0	72	19	53	9
Canada	3	2	0	1	85	32	53	7
Fiji	3	1	0	2	26	85	−59	5
Brazil	3	0	0	3	29	76	−47	3

4 December 2014
12:28

Canada	26–10	Brazil
	Report

The Sevens, Dubai

4 December 2014
12:50

England	26–0	Fiji
	Report

The Sevens, Dubai

4 December 2014
15:24

Canada	47–5	Fiji
	Report

The Sevens, Dubai

4 December 2014
15:46

England	29–7	Brazil
	Report

The Sevens, Dubai

4 December 2014
18:20

Fiji	21–12	Brazil
	Report

The Sevens, Dubai

4 December 2014
18:42

Canada	12–17	England
	Report

The Sevens, Dubai

== Knockout stage ==
=== Bowl ===
Semi-finals
5 December - 13:08 - The Sevens, Dubai
South Africa	17
China	0
5 December - 13:30 - The Sevens, Dubai
Spain	14
Brazil	19

Final
5 December - 17:04 - The Sevens, Dubai
South Africa	7
Brazil	17
Third place
5 December - 16:20 - The Sevens, Dubai
China	5
Spain	28

=== Plate ===
Quarter-finals
5 December – 10:00 – The Sevens, Dubai
Australia	47
Fiji	0
5 December – 10:22 – The Sevens, Dubai
United States	0
Canada	36
5 December – 10:44 – The Sevens, Dubai
England	5
France	7
5 December – 11:06 – The Sevens, Dubai
New Zealand	19
Russia	17

Semi-finals
5 December – 13:54 – The Sevens, Dubai
Fiji	24
United States	21
5 December – 14:16 – The Sevens, Dubai
England	21
Russia	19

Final
5 December – 17:41 – The Sevens, Dubai
Fiji	12
England	19
Third place
5 December – 16:42 – The Sevens, Dubai
United States	22
Russia	20

=== Cup ===
Quarter-finals
5 December – 10:00 – The Sevens, Dubai
Australia	47
Fiji	0
5 December – 10:22 – The Sevens, Dubai
United States	0
Canada	36
5 December – 10:44 – The Sevens, Dubai
England	5
France	7
5 December – 11:06 – The Sevens, Dubai
New Zealand	19
Russia	17

Semi-finals
5 December – 15:00 – The Sevens, Dubai
Australia	29
Canada	7
5 December – 15:22 – The Sevens, Dubai
France	10
New Zealand	31

Final
5 December – 18:31 – The Sevens, Dubai
Australia	17
New Zealand	19
Third place
5 December – 18:09 – The Sevens, Dubai
Canada	10
France	5
