= 2019 South Africa Women's Sevens =

- Women's Sevens Series VIII
- Host nation: South Africa
- Date: 13–15 December 2019

Cup
- Champion: New Zealand
- Runner-up: Australia
- Third: Canada

Tournament details
- Matches played: 28

The 2019 South Africa Women's Sevens was a tournament held at the Cape Town Stadium in Cape Town, South Africa from 13–15 December 2019. It will be the first edition of the South Africa Women's Sevens and will also be the third tournament of the 2019–20 World Rugby Women's Sevens Series.

== Format ==
The teams are drawn into three pools of four teams each. Each team plays every other team in their pool once. The top two teams from each pool advance to the Cup/Plate brackets while the top 2 third place teams also compete in the Cup/Plate. The other teams from each group play-off for the Challenge Trophy.

== Teams ==
Twelve teams will compete in the tournament with eleven being the core teams that compete throughout the entire season. The invited team for this tournament is South Africa.

- Australia
- Brazil
- Canada
- England
- Fiji
- France
- Ireland
- New Zealand
- Russia
- South Africa
- Spain
- United States

== Pool stage ==
Key to colours in group tables
Teams that advanced to the Cup Quarterfinal

=== Pool A ===
Team	Pld	W	D	L	PF	PA	PD	Pts
New Zealand	3	3	0	0	64	10	54	9
Fiji	3	2	0	1	73	36	37	7
Russia	3	1	0	2	50	62	-12	5
South Africa	3	0	0	3	17	98	-81	3

13 December 2019

Russia	19–38	Fiji

Cape Town Stadium, Cape Town

13 December 2019

New Zealand	40–0	South Africa

Cape Town Stadium, Cape Town

14 December 2019

Russia	31–12	South Africa

Cape Town Stadium, Cape Town

14 December 2019

New Zealand	12–10	Fiji

Cape Town Stadium, Cape Town

14 December 2019

Fiji	25–5	South Africa

Cape Town Stadium, Cape Town

14 December 2019

New Zealand	12–0	Russia

Cape Town Stadium, Cape Town

=== Pool B ===
Team	Pld	W	D	L	PF	PA	PD	Pts
France	3	3	0	0	95	24	71	9
Canada	3	2	0	1	72	21	51	7
Spain	3	1	0	2	48	78	-30	5
Brazil	3	0	0	3	14	106	-92	3

13 December 2019

France	36–12	Spain

Cape Town Stadium, Cape Town

13 December 2019

Canada	32–0	Brazil

Cape Town Stadium, Cape Town

14 December 2019

France	45–0	Brazil

Cape Town Stadium, Cape Town

14 December 2019

Canada	28–7	Spain

Cape Town Stadium, Cape Town

14 December 2019

Spain	29–14	Brazil

Cape Town Stadium, Cape Town

14 December 2019

Canada	12–14	France

Cape Town Stadium, Cape Town

=== Pool C ===
Team	Pld	W	D	L	PF	PA	PD	Pts
Australia	3	3	0	0	80	14	66	9
United States	3	2	0	1	73	38	35	7
England	3	1	0	2	43	60	-17	5
Ireland	3	0	0	3	19	103	-84	3

13 December 2019

Australia	32–0	England

Cape Town Stadium, Cape Town

13 December 2019

United States	38–12	Ireland

Cape Town Stadium, Cape Town

14 December 2019

Australia	29–0	Ireland

Cape Town Stadium, Cape Town

14 December 2019

United States	21–7	England

Cape Town Stadium, Cape Town

14 December 2019

England	36–7	Ireland

Cape Town Stadium, Cape Town

14 December 2019

United States	14–19	Australia

Cape Town Stadium, Cape Town

== Placement matches ==
=== Eleventh place ===
15 December 2019	Brazil	7–26	Ireland	Cape Town Stadium

=== Ninth place ===
15 December 2019	Spain	19–7	South Africa	Cape Town Stadium

== Knockout stage ==
=== Cup ===
Quarter-finals
15 December 2019 – Cape Town Stadium
France	31
Russia	0
15 December 2019 – Cape Town Stadium
Australia	38
Fiji	7
15 December 2019 – Cape Town Stadium
Canada	15
United States	14
15 December 2019 – Cape Town Stadium
New Zealand	26
England	21

Semi-finals
15 December 2019 – Cape Town Stadium
France	19
Australia	24
15 December 2019 – Cape Town Stadium
Canada	5
New Zealand	15

Cup Final
15 December 2019 – Cape Town Stadium
Australia	7
New Zealand	17
Third place
15 December 2019 – Cape Town Stadium
France	17
Canada (a.e.t.)	22

Matches

Quarter-finals

15 December 2019	France	31–0	Russia	Cape Town Stadium

15 December 2019	Australia	38–0	Fiji	Cape Town Stadium

15 December 2019	Canada	15–14	United States	Cape Town Stadium

15 December 2019	New Zealand	26–21	England	Cape Town Stadium

Semi-finals

15 December 2019	France	19–24	Australia	Cape Town Stadium

15 December 2019	Canada	5–15	New Zealand	Cape Town Stadium

3rd place

15 December 2019	France	17–22 (a.e.t.)	Canada	Cape Town Stadium

Cup Final

15 December 2019	Australia	7–17	New Zealand	Cape Town Stadium

== Tournament placings ==
Place	Team	Points
1st place, gold medalist(s)	New Zealand	20
2nd place, silver medalist(s)	Australia	18
3rd place, bronze medalist(s)	Canada	16
4	France	14
5	United States	12
6	Fiji	10

Place	Team	Points
7	England	8
8	Russia	6
9	Spain	4
10	South Africa	3
11	Ireland	2
12	Brazil	1

Source: World Rugby

== See also ==
- World Rugby Women's Sevens Series
- 2019–20 World Rugby Women's Sevens Series
- 2019 South Africa Sevens
