= 2013 Dubai Women's Sevens =

- Women's Sevens Series II
- Host nation: United Arab Emirates
- Date: 28–29 November 2013

Cup
- Champion: Australia
- Runner-up: New Zealand

Plate
- Winner: England
- Runner-up: Spain

Bowl
- Winner: Fiji
- Runner-up: France

The 2013 Dubai Sevens was the first tournament within the 2013-14 Sevens World Series. It was held over the weekend of 28–29 November 2013 at The Sevens Stadium in Dubai.

== Format ==
The teams were drawn into three pools of four teams each. Each team played everyone in their pool one time. The top two teams from each pool advanced to the Cup/Plate brackets while the top 2 third place teams will also compete in the Cup/Plate. The rest of the teams from each group went to the Bowl brackets.

== Teams ==
The participating teams and schedule were announced on 23 October 2013.

- Australia
- Brazil
- Canada
- England
- Fiji
- France
- Ireland
- New Zealand
- Russia
- Spain
- Tunisia
- United States

== Pool Stage ==
Key to colours in group tables
Teams that advance to the Cup Quarterfinal

=== Pool A ===
Team	Pld	W	D	L	PF	PA	PD	Pts
New Zealand	3	3	0	0	93	7	+86	9
United States	3	1	1	1	36	62	−26	6
Fiji	3	1	0	2	64	62	+2	5
Ireland	3	0	1	2	17	79	−62	4

28 November 2013
13:44

New Zealand	33–7	Fiji
	Report

The Sevens, Dubai

28 November 2013
14:06

United States	12–12	Ireland
	Report

The Sevens, Dubai

28 November 2013
16:42

New Zealand	29–0	Ireland
	Report

The Sevens, Dubai

28 November 2013
17:04

United States	24–19	Fiji
	Report

The Sevens, Dubai

28 November 2013
19:40

Ireland	5–38	Fiji
	Report

The Sevens, Dubai

28 November 2013
20:02

New Zealand	31–0	United States
	Report

The Sevens, Dubai

=== Pool B ===
Team	Pld	W	D	L	PF	PA	PD	Pts
Russia	3	2	1	0	68	10	+58	8
Spain	3	1	2	0	69	24	+45	7
England	3	1	1	1	50	31	+19	6
Tunisia	3	0	0	3	5	127	−122	3

28 November 2013
14:28

England	36–5	Tunisia
	Report

The Sevens, Dubai

28 November 2013
14:50

Russia	10–10	Spain
	Report

The Sevens, Dubai

28 November 2013
17:26

England	14–14	Spain
	Report

The Sevens, Dubai

28 November 2013
17:48

Russia	46–0	Tunisia
	Report

The Sevens, Dubai

28 November 2013
20:24

Spain	45–0	Tunisia
	Report

The Sevens, Dubai

28 November 2013
20:46

England	0–12	Russia
	Report

The Sevens, Dubai

=== Pool C ===
Team	Pld	W	D	L	PF	PA	PD	Pts
Australia	3	3	0	0	86	20	+66	9
Canada	3	1	1	1	48	29	+19	6
Brazil	3	1	1	1	34	57	−23	6
France	3	0	0	3	7	69	−62	3

28 November 2013
13:00

Canada	26–0	France
	Report

The Sevens, Dubai

28 November 2013
13:22

Australia	38–10	Brazil
	Report

The Sevens, Dubai

28 November 2013
15:58

Canada	12–12	Brazil
	Report

The Sevens, Dubai

28 November 2013
16:20

Australia	31–0	France
	Report

The Sevens, Dubai

28 November 2013
18:56

Brazil	12–7	France
	Report

The Sevens, Dubai

28 November 2013
19:18

Canada	10–17	Australia
	Report

The Sevens, Dubai

== Knockout stage ==
=== Bowl ===
Bowl semi-finals
29 November - 14:40 - The Sevens, Dubai
Fiji	38
Tunisia	5
29 November - 15:02 - The Sevens, Dubai
Ireland	10
France	38

Ninth place
29 November - 19:04 - The Sevens, Dubai
Fiji	14
France	10
Eleventh place
29 November - 17:32 - The Sevens, Dubai
Tunisia	0
Ireland	17

=== Plate ===
Plate semi-finals
29 November - 15:26 - The Sevens, Dubai
Brazil	5
Spain	7
29 November - 15:48 - The Sevens, Dubai
United States	10
England	12

Fifth place
29 November - 19:29 - The Sevens, Dubai
Spain	10
England	17
Seventh place
29 November - 17:57 - The Sevens, Dubai
Brazil	24
United States	26

=== Cup ===
Quarter-finals
29 November - 11:40 - The Sevens, Dubai
New Zealand	40
Brazil	7
29 November - 12:02 - The Sevens, Dubai
Spain	12
Canada	17
29 November - 12:24 - The Sevens, Dubai
Russia	36
United States	0
29 November - 12:46 - The Sevens, Dubai
Australia	19
England	12

Semi-finals
29 November - 16:10 - The Sevens, Dubai
New Zealand	19
Canada	5
29 November - 16:32 - The Sevens, Dubai
Russia	0
Australia	31

Final
29 November - 20:46 - The Sevens, Dubai
New Zealand	27
Australia	35
Third place
29 November - 20:22 - The Sevens, Dubai
Russia	15
Canada	10
