= New Zealand Women's Sevens =

Rugby sevens tournament

- Recent tournament 2023 New Zealand Women's Sevens
- Sport: Rugby sevens
- Inaugural season: 2019
- Holders: New Zealand (2023)
- Most titles: New Zealand (2 titles)

The New Zealand Women's Sevens was an annual women's rugby sevens tournament, hosted at Waikato Stadium in Hamilton. The tournament was one of the stops on the World Rugby Women's Sevens Series and was hosted as part of a fully integrated women's and men's event.

== History ==
The inaugural event in 2019, promoted as the Women's Fast Four, was an invitational competition held alongside the men's tournament on the world circuit, with home team New Zealand defeating France in the final.

== Champions ==
Year	Venue	Cup final			Placings			Ref
		Winner	Score	Runner-up	Third	Fourth	Fifth	
2019 (Fast 4)	Waikato Stadium	New Zealand	31–0	France	England	China	n/a	
2020	Waikato Stadium	New Zealand	24–7	Canada	France	Australia	United States	
World Series tournaments planned for Hamilton were cancelled in 2021 and 2022, due to impacts of the COVID-19 pandemic.
2023	Waikato Stadium	New Zealand	33–7	United States	Australia	Ireland	Great Britain	
