= Arena Barueri =

Multi-use stadium in Barueri, Brazil

Coordinates: 23°30′47″S 46°53′58″W

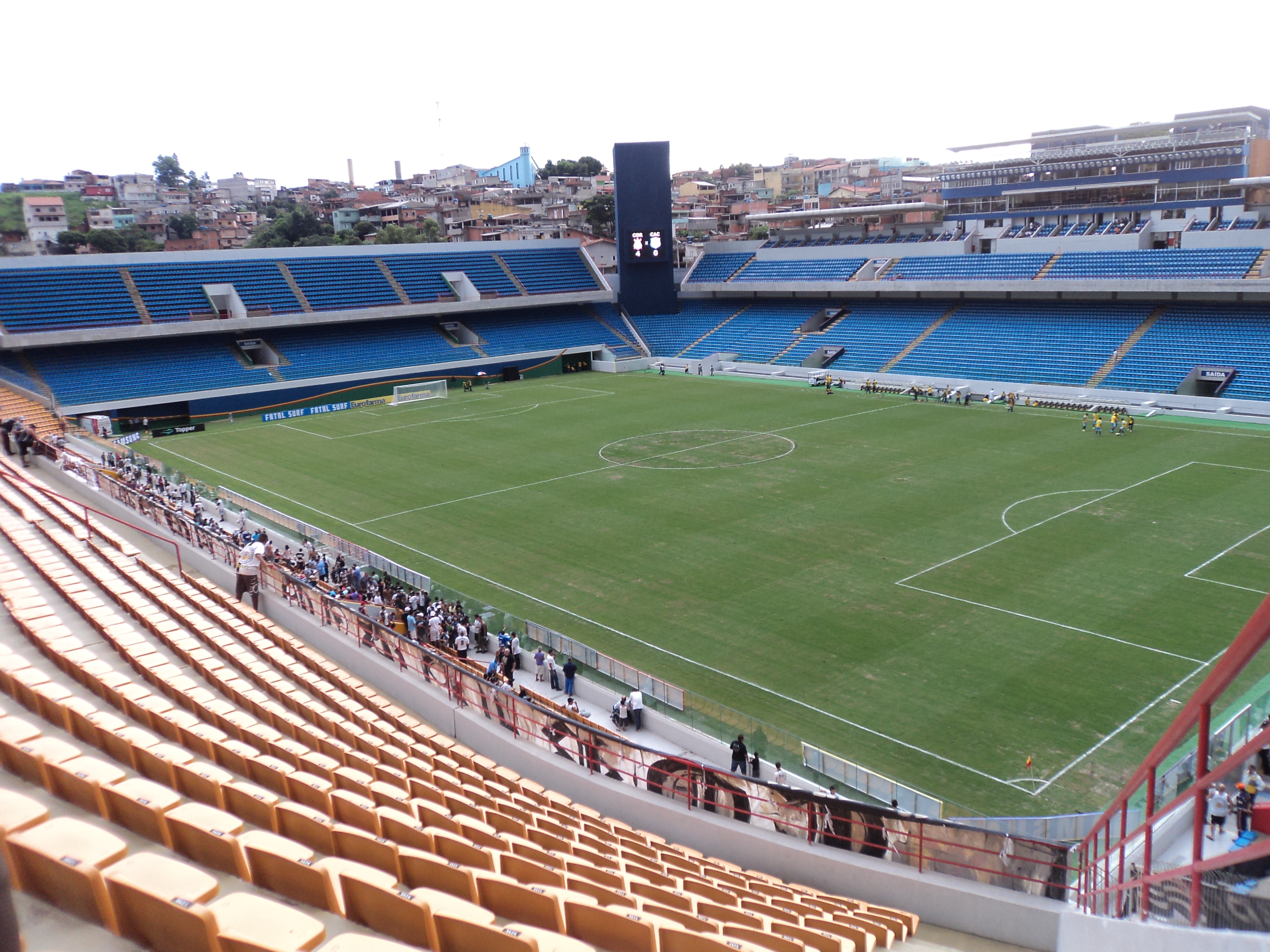
- Sisbrace
- Interactive map of Arena Barueri
- Full name: Estádio Dr. Orlando Batista Novelli
- Location: Barueri, São Paulo, Brazil
- Owner: City of Barueri
- Operator: Crefisa
- Capacity: 31,452
- Surface: Turf
- Field size: 105 by 68 metres (114.8 yd × 74.4 yd)
- Public transit: Jardim Belval

Construction
- Opened: May 26, 2007; 19 years ago

Tenants
- Grêmio Barueri (2007–2010, 2011–2017); Sport Club Barueri (2010–2012); Palmeiras (some matches); Santos (some matches); São Paulo (some matches); Oeste (2017–present)

Arena Barueri is a multi-use stadium located in Barueri, São Paulo state, Brazil. It is used mostly for football matches and hosts the home matches of Oeste, and hosted the matches of Grêmio Recreativo Barueri until the 2010 season. The stadium has a maximum capacity of 31,452 people and was built in 2007. It is owned by the City of Barueri. During the reforming of Palestra Italia Stadium the Barueri Arena was being used for some home matches of Palmeiras.

== History ==
Arena Barueri's construction started in June 2006. The stadium was inaugurated on May 26, 2007, with an initial maximum capacity of 17,000 people. The current stadium's capacity is 31,452 people. The inaugural match was played on that day, when Grêmio Barueri beat Criciúma 2–1. The first goal in the stadium was scored by Criciúma's Sílvio Criciúma. The stadium's attendance record currently stands at 28,557, set in the first leg of Copa do Brasil finals, played on July 5, 2012, in which Palmeiras won 2–0 against Coritiba. Arena Barueri hosted the 2010 Copa Libertadores de Fútbol Femenino games. Also, it was the stadium where Rogério Ceni, São Paulo's goalkeeper, scored his 100th goal of his career.

In 2013, the stadium hosted the final of the Campeonato Brasileiro de Rugby, Brazil's national club Rugby competition, held between SPAC and Pasteur Athletique Clube.

On April 26, 2014, Brazil national rugby team beat Chile for the first time ever in the stadium.
