= Rugby union in Serbia =

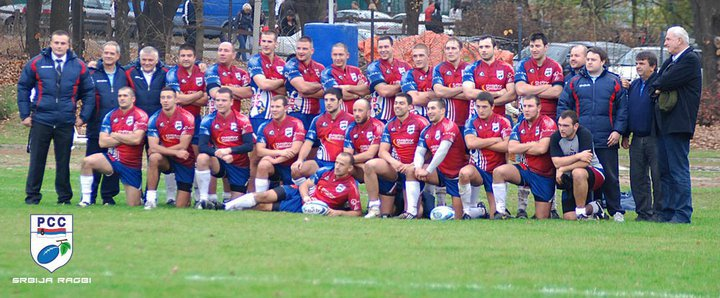
- The Serbian national team in 2010.
- Governing body: Rugby Union of Serbia
- Registered players: 2,419
- Clubs: 12

Club competitions
- Regional Rugby Championship; Rugby Championship of Serbia

International competitions
- European Nations Cup; Sevens Grand Prix Series; Qualification tournaments: Rugby World Cup qualifiers; Rugby World Cup Sevens qualifiers; Sevens World Series qualifiers

Rugby union in Serbia is a minor but growing sport. The game was first played in Belgrade after the first World War and was revived again in the 1950s. Serbia currently has 12 rugby clubs and around 2,000 players.

== Governing body ==
The Rugby Union of Serbia (Рагби Савез Србије) is the national governing body for the sport. It has been a member of World Rugby (formerly the IRB) since 1988.

== History ==
=== Early years: 1918 to 1931 ===
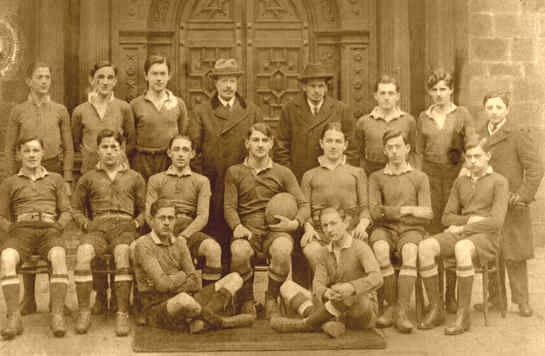
A Serbian rugby team in 1918.

The first known Serbian rugby players were students at George Heriot's School in Edinburgh, Scotland during the First World War. On March 8, 1918, they played the first unofficial international game against students from a British Colonies and won by eight points to three in front of 10,000 spectators. Notable players were Toma Tomic from Leskovac, Dimitrije Dulkanovic from Cuprija and Danilo Pavlovic from Prokuplje. Under the name Serbians they played games against Edinburgh school teams - Royal High School, George Heriot's School, etc.

Another group of Serbian boys played rugby in Glasgow, in Hillhead High School. The best player was Slavoljub DJordjevic. From 1917 till 1926 he played more than 100 games for Hillhead High School, Hilhead High School FP and Glasgow University. In Dundee three Serbian boys - Miodrag Dimitrijevic, Dusan Bozjakovic and Vladimir Orovic, played for the High School of Dundee. In total more than 30 Serbian boys played rugby football in UK during WW1.

The students returned to Serbia after the war and formed the "Jugoslavija" club in Belgrade and the "Beli orao" club in Sabac. By 1923, however, rugby activities had ceased due to a lack of available pitches. In 1931 group of former students from Scotland - Toma Tomić, former George Heriot's School student, Krsta Balic, ex Hillhead High School and Milorad Jevdjovic, former Harris Academy, Dundee, formed Belgrade Rugby Club.

=== Rugby in Yugoslavia: 1953 to 1992 ===
Rugby was re-introduced to the country in the 1950s. A Belgrade team, RK Partizan, was formed in 1953 and a few months later the Radnicki club was formed. The first match between the two teams was played in April 1954 with Partizan winning 21–11.

The Rugby Championship of Yugoslavia ran from 1957 to 1992. Dinamo Pančevo won the first championship played in 1957, and later in '68, '69, '74 and '79. Dinamo Pančevo won the first Cup competition held that same year, in 1979. RK Partizan, won the second, third, and fourth titles in 1958 to '60 as well as the final two in '91 and '92 before the breakup of Yugoslavia.

The Yugoslavia national rugby union team played its first international in July 1968 against a Romanian XV, losing 3 points to 11. Through the 70s and 80s, Serbian players represented Yugoslavia together with players from Slovenia, Croatia and Bosnia. This came to an end in 1991 with the Yugoslav Wars which resulted in a gap of five years with no international rugby.

=== Post-breakup: 1992 onward ===
The Serbian clubs played in the Serbia and Montenegro Championship from the 1992–93 season through until 2005–06. The competition became the Rugby Championship of Serbia from 2006 to 2007 onwards.

When the Yugoslav team reformed in 1996, it consisted of players from Serbia only and they played their first international against Andorra at Vršac in May of that year. From 2003 to mid 2006, they played as Serbia and Montenegro. After the two countries split in 2006, Serbia and Montenegro had their own national teams.

== Serbian national teams ==
The first official international match played by the Serbia national rugby union team was in October 2006. The Serbia women's national rugby union team played their first international in 2007, but now mainly focus on rugby sevens. The men's and women's national teams (15s and 7s) compete mainly in European competitions.

As of February 2015, the Serbian national team was placed 84th in the World Rugby rankings.

== Domestic structure ==
The teams in the Rugby Championship of Serbia as of 2021 are:

Division A:
- BRK Red Star
- Rad
- Partizan
- Vojvodina
- Dinamo 1954
Division B:
- Loznica
- RK Rad B
- Vršac
- RK Panonija Ruma
- RK Torpedo Mlava
- RK Dorcol 1998
- Krusevac
Development clubs:
- RK Pobednik Beograd
- RK Zarkovo Beograd
- Borac Starcevo

Teams that previously participated in the Serbian Championship (senior and youth programs) include:^{[b]} RK Dorćol, RK Red Star, Balkan Mosquito, Royal Belgrade, RK Singidunum, RK Zmajevi, RK Palilulac, RK Leva obala, RK Borac (all from Belgrade), RK Petrovgrad (from Zrenjanin), RK Iron Fortress (from Smederevo), RK Giants (Gornji Milanovac), RK Morava gepardi (from Leskovac). Rugby clubs in Serbia which had women's teams are: RK Partizan, RK Krusevac, RK Rad and Belgrade Women's rugby club (Ženski ragbi klub Beograd), the only specifically women's club.

Notes:

^{a} RK Pobednik was renamed RK Rad (Labor RC) in December 2014. The club fields teams in both divisions of the national championship.
^{b} This list might be incomplete.

== See also ==
- Serbia national rugby union team
- Rugby union in Yugoslavia
- Serbia women's national rugby union team
