= Rugby union in Croatia =

- Country: Croatia
- Governing body: Croatian Rugby Union
- National team: Croatia
- First played: 1954
- Registered players: 2,142 (August 2011)
- Clubs: 21 (August 2011)

International competitions
- Rugby World Cup; Rugby World Cup Sevens; Sevens World Series; European Nations Cup

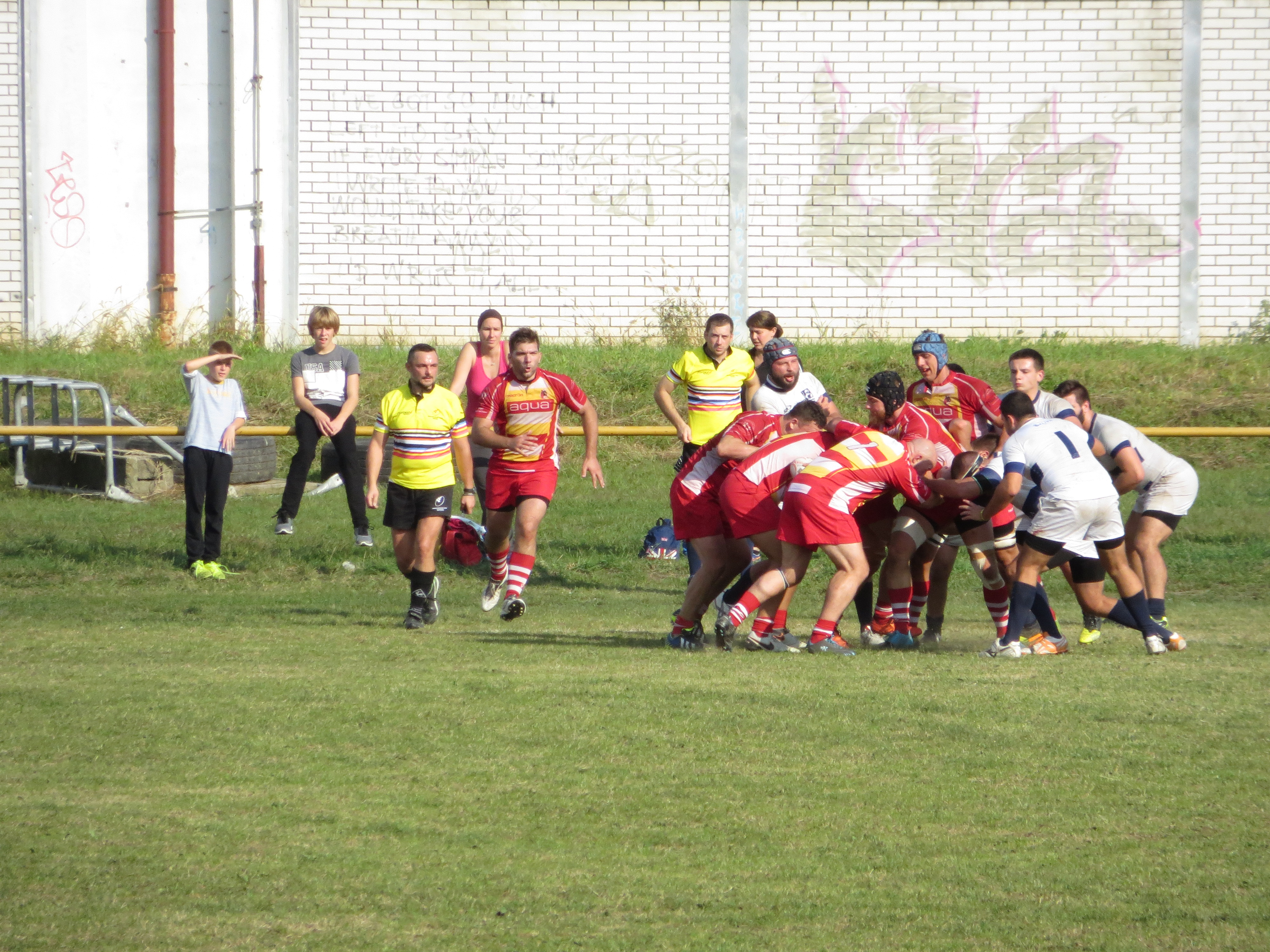

Rugby union in Croatia is a minor sport. As of August 2011, they are ranked fiftieth in the World Rugby's world rankings.

== Governing body ==
The Croatian Rugby Union (Croatian: Hrvatski ragbijaški savez) was founded in 1962 (as a domestic body), became a full national body in 1992 (after independence) and joined the IRB in 1994.

== History ==
Rugby union in pre-independence Croatia was a moderately popular sport, but due to its recent international successes, it is gaining more recognition.

=== Yugoslav period ===
Some people date the start of Croatian rugby to 17 January 1954 when the Mladost team from Zagreb was formed to become Croatia's first rugby union club. Some years later, a XV from London Welsh RFC toured Zagreb, which may be seen as a sign of how things were to improve.

Croatian sides competed in the Rugby Championship of Yugoslavia, which ran from 1957-1991. Croatia was something of a centre of rugby union in Yugoslavia before it gained its independence.

=== Post-independence ===
The breakup of Yugoslavia meant that rugby was a low priority. However, it ironically had something of a minor revival in Croatia, when occupying British troops started to play regular games against the locals in the 1990s. By that point there were a thousand registered players in the country, and fourteen clubs, and some fifty Croats playing in the France's top three divisions.

In the early 1990s, former Italian cap, Dr Giancarlo Tizanini was a major driving force in Austrian rugby. Before his death in 1994, he tried hard to establish a Central European equivalent of the Six Nations between Austria, Hungary, Croatia, Slovenia and Bosnia.

The biggest rugby "scrum" in the world was made on 14 Oct 2007, in Croatia, with over 200 players of all categories from Croatian rugby club Nada, for a Millennium Photo.

As of August 2011, more than half of the 2,000 registered players are pre-teens or teenagers. In addition, there are currently 23 domestic clubs that compete against each other at various levels.

== Women's rugby ==
Croatia's women played their first test match against Bulgaria on 2 December 2023 at Sinj.

== National team ==
The national team has been competing since the early 1990s. As of April 2009, the national team is currently competing in the European Nations Cup and is attempting to qualify for the 2011 Rugby World Cup.

Croatia have a host of players who are New Zealanders, Australians and South Africans of Croatian origin who play the game and have played internationally for these countries.

Frano Botica was a one time Croatian rugby coach and former All Black, whose grandparents were born in Korčula. Another former All Black who turned out for the Croatian side at the same time was Matthew Cooper. Dan Luger is an England representative whose father Darko Luger is from the island of Brac. Sean Fitzpatrick is another former All Black captain who has Croatian heritage. Also they have recently appointed a new coach named Milan Yelavich, he has a Croatian heritage but lives in New Zealand. He has coached the North Harbour Rugby team and has been associated with many other Rugby teams in New Zealand.

== Domestic competition ==
=== Local Teams ===
There are 22 men's teams and 1 women's team. Teams are located in the major cities.

Currently members of the Croatian Rugby Federation are the following teams (and cities in brackets)

- RK Knin (Knin)
- Pula (Pula)
- Invictus Dubrovnik (Dubrovnik)
- Kastelanska Rivijera (Kaštela)
- Lokomotiva (Zagreb)
- Makarska Rivijera (Makarska)
- HARK (Hrvatski Akademski Ragbi Klub) Mladost (Zagreb)
- Nada (Split)
- Ploce (Ploče)
- Ragbi '59 (Split)
- Rijeka (Rijeka)
- Rudes (Zagreb)
- Sinj Dalmacija (Sinj)
- RK Sisak (Sisak)
- Šibenik (Šibenik)
- RK Zadar (Zadar)
- RK Zagreb (rugby union) (Zagreb)
- Zagreb Veteranski RK (Zagreb)
- Zrinski (Zagreb)
- Atletiko Filipjakov (Sv. Filip i Jakov)
- Novi Zagreb Rugby

The woman's club is called Viktorija Zagreb.

=== Interliga Competition and Regional Rugby Championship ===
The Interliga involved club teams from Croatia, Slovenia and previously Bosnia-Herzegovina.

In 2004/05, 9 teams participated (Croatia: RK Nada Split, RK Zagreb, HARK Mladost, Makarska Rivijera and RK Sisak - Slovenia: RK Ljubljana, Bežigrad and Emona - Bosnia: RK Čelik) with Ljubljana finishing first.

In 2005/06, 5 teams entered with Croatia's Zagreb winning the competition.

In 2006/07, 6 teams entered and Nada became competition winners for the first time.

Also in season 2007/08 onward, a Regional Rugby Championship was set up with teams from Croatia, Hungary, Slovenia, Bosnia-Herzegovina and Serbia and others.

== See also ==
- Croatia national rugby union team
- Rugby union in Yugoslavia (pre-1992)
