= Rugby union in Yugoslavia =

- Country: Yugoslavia
- National team(s): Yugoslavia

National competitions
- Rugby World Cup; European Nations Cup; Rugby World Cup Sevens; IRB Sevens World Series

Club competitions
- Rugby Championship of Yugoslavia

Rugby union in Yugoslavia was a moderately popular sport. It was most popular in the Croatian SR (especially Zagreb), and to a lesser extent in the Serbian and Slovenian SRs (especially Belgrade and Ljubljana), with some presence in the Bosnian SR as well.

== History ==
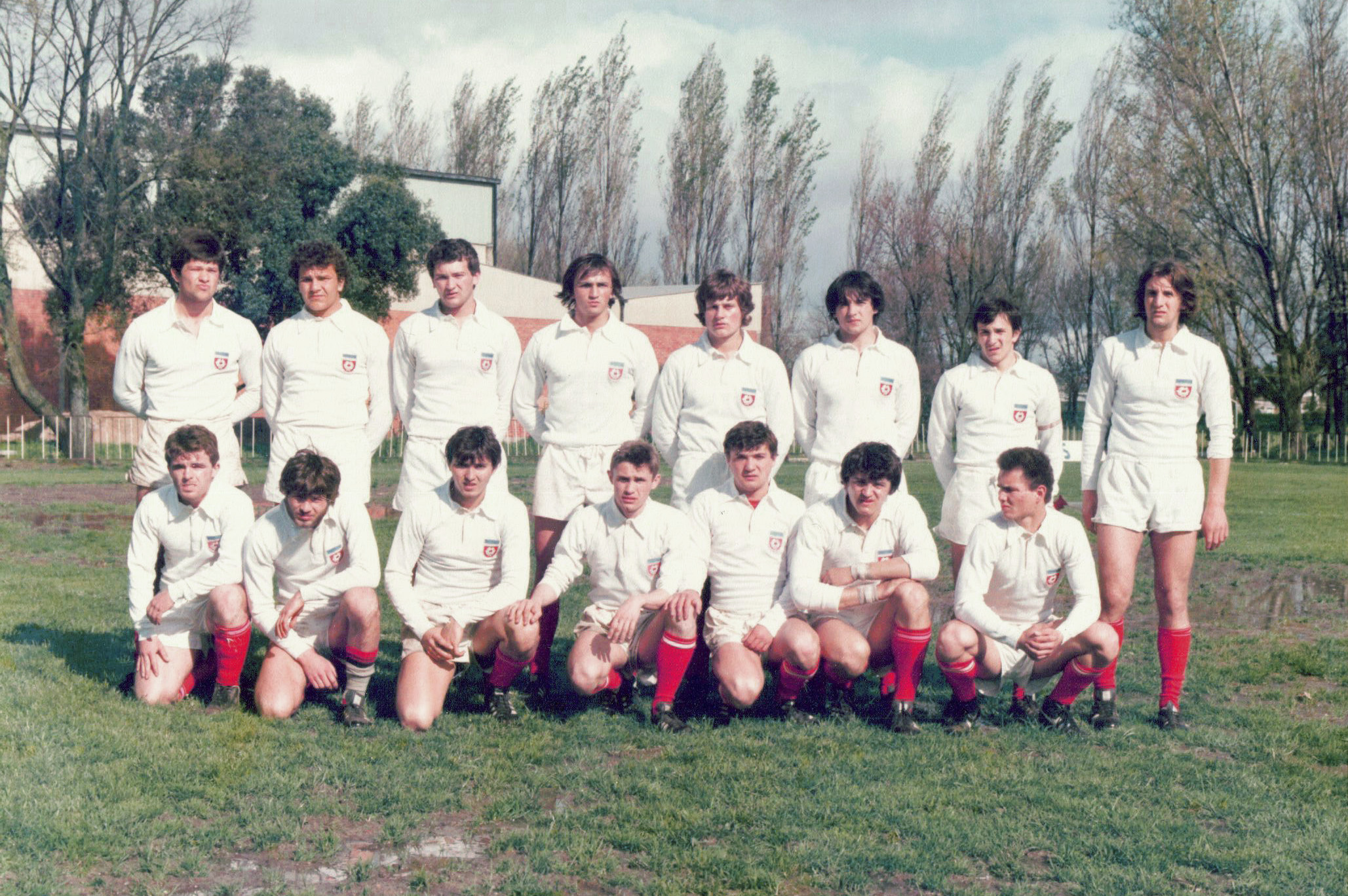
The Yugoslavia U-19 team in 1979

=== 1950s and 1960s ===
Some people date the start of Croatian rugby to the 17th of January 1954 when the Mladost team from Zagreb was formed to become Croatia's first rugby union club.

In 1953, a rival code of rugby league was introduced in Serbia, rather than rugby union played in Croatia and the authorities demanded that Serbian clubs switch to rugby union to unite Yugoslavia under one form of rugby football in 1964.

=== 1970s and 1980s ===
Yugoslav rugby did not enjoy a high reputation. For example, in 1988, an anonymous French rugby official joked that "one of the FIRA nightmares... is to have Yugoslavia playing Bulgaria refereed by a Soviet."

Yugoslavia was not invited to the first Rugby World Cup in 1987, and did not qualify for the second in 1991.

The former All Black scrum half Chris Laidlaw, writing at the end of the 1970s, saw rugby as a positive force in east-west relations at the time:

"Rugby has become the ping-pong of outdoor sports in its capacity to spread goodwill between East and West. Over the last 30 or 40 years it has spread through Eastern Europe, establishing itself strongly in Rumania and Yugoslavia, Hungary and into the USSR. The fact that a Russian team [sic] has finally played a full-scale, if unofficial Test match against France speaks for itself."

Yugoslavia affiliated with the IRB in 1988, and played in the 1988 World Cup qualification.

Due to the links between many Yugoslav (mostly Croat) and New Zealand families, the side also toured there.

=== Break up of Yugoslavia ===
1. Bosnia and Herzegovina, 2. Croatia, 3. Macedonia,
4. Montenegro, 5. Serbia,
5a. Kosovo, 5b. Vojvodina, 6. Slovenia

In the early 1990s, former Italian cap, Dr Giancarlo Tizanini was a major driving force in Austrian rugby. Before his death in 1994, he tried hard to establish a Central European equivalent of the Six Nations between Austria, Hungary, Croatia, Slovenia and Bosnia.

== Popularity ==
Rugby union was a moderately popular sport in Yugoslavia (a name which Serbia retained long after the disintegration of that state). Although rugby union in Croatia was the main centre for the sport in the former Yugoslavia, there was still quite a bit of rugby played in Serbia. The Rugby Championship of Yugoslavia ran from 1957-1991. Partizan, a Belgrade team, won the second, third, and fourth title, as well as the final one in 1991 and Dinamo Pančevo won the first ever championship played in 1957, and won again in 1968, 1969, 1974 and 1979. Dinamo Pančevo won their first Cup in the same year.

== Domestic competition ==
- Rugby Championship of Yugoslavia

== National team ==
The SFR Yugoslavia side was, strictly speaking, a multinational side, consisting as it did of representatives of all the various nations within the SFR Yugoslavia.

== See also ==
- Rugby union in Kosovo
  - Kosovo national rugby union team
- Rugby union in Bosnia
  - Bosnia and Herzegovina national rugby union team
  - Bosnia and Herzegovina women's national rugby union team
- Rugby union in Croatia
  - Croatia national rugby union team
- Rugby union in Montenegro
  - Montenegro national rugby union team
- Rugby union in Serbia
  - Serbia national rugby union team
  - Serbia women's national rugby union team
- Rugby union in Slovenia
  - Slovenia national rugby union team

== See also ==
- RK Nada
- RK Zagreb (rugby union)
