= 2. Rugby Bundesliga (Austria) =

Level in Austrian rugby union club competition

The 2. Rugby Bundesliga is the second level of domestic club rugby union competition in Austria. Wombats RC of Wiener Neustadt is the only separate club in the league, the rest of the teams being the second teams of the 1. Rugby Bundesliga clubs.

== History ==
The 2. Rugby Bundesliga was first played in the 1995/1996 season.

== Current teams ==
2010-11 season

Location of teams in the 1. Rugby Bundesliga 2010-11

| Club | Full name | City | Stadium |
|---|---|---|---|
| Celtic Wanderers | Vienna Celtic Rugby Football Club | Vienna | Sportareal Dirnelwiese (Note: Have also played matches at ASKÖ Sportplatz Atzgersdorf and Neuklosterwiese in Wiener Neustadt.) |
| Donau Korsaren | Rugby Club Donau | Vienna | Sportareal Dirnelwiese |
| Stade Viennois II | Rugby Club Stade Viennois | Vienna | Sportareal Dirnelwiese |
| Tiroler Böck | Rugby Club Innsbruck | Innsbruck | Fenner Stadion (Note: Have also played a few matches at Hatting Sportplatz.) |
| Wombats | Wombats Rugby Club | Wiener Neustadt | Neuklosterwiese |

== Results ==
The scores in blue are links to accounts of finals on the site of the Austrian Rugby Federation (ÖRV) - in German

Year | Champion | Score | Runner-up | Place
1993
1994
1995
1996
1997
1998
1999
2000
2001
2002
2003
2004
2005
2006
2007
2008 | 1. Oberösterreichischer Rugby Sport Club | Niederösterreichischer XV | Hohe Warte Stadium, Vienna
2009
2010

== See also ==
- Rugby union in Austria
