= Rugby union at the Mediterranean Games =

Rugby union at the African Games
- Rugby union
- Frequency: Every four years
- Inaugurated: 1955 (Spain) Barcelona
- Most recent: 1993 (France) Languedoc
- Most successful team(s): France (FRA)

Rugby union at the Mediterranean Games has been played four times from 1955 to 1993.

== Men's tournaments ==
Year	Host	Gold medal game			Bronze medal game
Year	Host	Gold medalist	Score	Silver medalist	Bronze medalist	Score	Fourth place
1955; Details	(Spain); Barcelona	France	^{n/a}	Italy	Spain
1979; Details	(Socialist Federal Republic of Yugoslavia); Split	France	^{n/a}	Italy	Morocco		Yugoslavia
1983; Details	(Morocco); Casablanca	France	^{n/a}	Italy	Morocco		Spain
1993; Details	(France); Languedoc	France	^{n/a}	Italy	Spain		Croatia

^n/a A round-robin tournament determined the final standings.

=== Medal table ===
Rank	Nation	Gold	Silver	Bronze	Total
1	France	4	0	0	4
2	Italy	0	4	0	4
3	Morocco	0	0	2	2
3	Spain	0	0	2	2
Totals (4 entries)		4	4	4	12
