= Rugby union in Slovenia =

- Country: Slovenia
- National team: Slovenia
- First played: 1900
- Registered players: 1,065
- Clubs: 16

National competitions
- Rugby World Cup; Rugby World Cup Sevens; IRB Sevens World Series; European Nations Cup

Rugby union in Slovenia is a minor but growing sport. As of August 2019 they are currently ranked 71st by the World Rugby governing body.

== Governing body ==
The governing body is Rugby Zveza Slovenije (Rugby Union of Slovenia).

== History ==
=== Yugoslav period ===
Rugby union was a moderately popular sport in Yugoslavia. Although rugby union in Croatia was the main centre for the sport in Yugoslavia, there was still quite a bit of rugby played in Slovenia. The Rugby Championship of Yugoslavia ran from 1957-1991.

=== Post independence ===
The breakup of Yugoslavia broke up many of the Slovenian rugby structures, which had to be started afresh.

In the early 1990s, former Italian cap, Dr Giancarlo Tizanini was a major driving force in Austrian rugby. Before his death in 1994, he tried hard to establish a Central European equivalent of the Six Nations between Austria, Hungary, Croatia, Slovenia and Bosnia.

Slovenia also borders Italy, which is a major rugby playing nation. In recent years, however, there have been serious attempts by rugby league to expand into the Balkans, using substantial financial incentives, and expats from Australia.

== Clubs ==
As of 2009, the following clubs were active:

- RAK Olimpija
- RFC BEŽIGRAD
- RFC Doberman
- RFC Emoona
- RFC Maribor
- RFC Ribnica
- RFC Ris
- RK Ljubljana
- RK Sokol Maribor(Maribor Sokol)
- VRK Hermes (Veterans Rugby Club)

== See also ==
- Slovenia national rugby union team
