= Rugby union in Bosnia and Herzegovina =

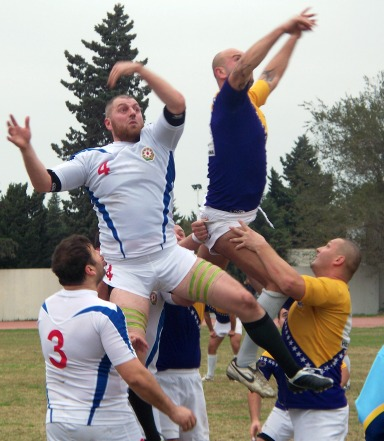
- Bosnia vs Azerbaijan
- Country: Bosnia and Herzegovina
- National team: Bosnia and Herzegovina
- First played: 1950s
- Registered players: 869
- Clubs: 9

National competitions
- Rugby World Cup; Rugby World Cup Sevens; IRB Sevens World Series; European Nations Cup

Rugby union in Bosnia and Herzegovina is a minor sport. They are currently ranked sixty-eight in the International Rugby Board's world rankings, despite the lack of recognition as an official sport by the government. The governing body for the sport in the country is Rugby Federation of Bosnia and Herzegovina since 1992.

== History ==
=== Yugoslav period ===
Rugby union was a moderately popular sport in Yugoslavia (a name which Serbia retained long after the disintegration of that state). The Rugby Championship of Yugoslavia ran from 1957-1991.

=== Post independence ===
Rugby union in Bosnia and Herzegovina has not been popular historically, but due to its recent international successes, it is gaining more recognition. As of December 2008, more than half of the eight hundred registered players were pre-teens or teenagers. In addition, there are currently eleven domestic clubs that compete against each other on various levels.

In the early 1990s, former Italian cap, Dr Giancarlo Tizanini was a major driving force in Austrian rugby. Before his death in 1994, he tried hard to establish a Central European equivalent of the Six Nations between Austria, Hungary, Croatia, Slovenia and Bosnia.

== National team ==
The national team has been competing since the early 1990s.

== See also ==
- Bosnia and Herzegovina national rugby union team
- Bosnia and Herzegovina women's national rugby union team
- Rugby union in Yugoslavia (pre-1992)
