= Regional Rugby Championship =

Annual rugby union competition

- Current season or competition: 2025-26 Regional Rugby Championship
- Sport: Rugby union
- Instituted: 2007
- Number of teams: 6
- Nations: (Serbia) (Croatia) (Bosnia and Herzegovina) (Slovenia) (Montenegro) (Hungary)
- Holders: (Bosnia and Herzegovina) RK Čelik
- Most titles: (Croatia) RK Nada Split (9 titles)
- Website: Official site

The Regional Rugby Championship is an annual rugby union competition involving sides from Bosnia-Herzegovina, Croatia, Hungary, Montenegro, Serbia and Slovenia. This was a successor to the Interliga between clubs from Bosnia-Herzegovina, Croatia and Slovenia which started in 2004/2005. In the past the Championship has also featured teams from Austria and Bulgaria, and invitations to teams from Greece. Currently six teams qualify each season, based on their performance in national championships. The first season in 2007/2008 had 11 teams. The 2019/2020 season was suspended due to the COVID-19 pandemic.

== Teams ==
Team	Stadium	Capacity	Most Recent Season
(Austria) Rugby Club Donau Wien	Rugby Donau Park		2015/2016
(Bosnia and Herzegovina) RK Čelik Zenica	Stadion Kamberovica polje	5,000	2019/2020
(Bosnia and Herzegovina) RK Rudar Zenica	Stadion Kamberovica polje	5,000	2012/2013
(Bulgaria) RC Valiacite			2008/2009
(Croatia) RT Dalmacija			2019/2020
(Croatia) RK Makarska Rivijera			2007/2008
(Croatia) HARK Mladost	Stadion Krtičnjak	500	2019/2020
(Croatia) RK Nada Split	Stadion Stari plac	5,000	2019/2020
(Croatia) RK Zagreb	Stadion Rudeš	500	2013/2014
(Croatia) Zagrebački Ragbi Savez (Zagreb Federation)			2019/2020
(Greece) Athens RFC			2011/2012 Forfeited all games
(Hungary) Battai Bulldogok RK Százhalombatta			2012/2013
(Hungary) Esztergomi Vitézek Rugby SE			2013/2014
(Hungary) Kecskeméti Atlétika és Rugby Club			2013/2014
(Hungary) Magyarok RC (Hungarian Federation)			2014/2015
Ragbi Klub Arsenal Porto Montenegro	Stadion FK Arsenal	1,000	2014/2015
(Serbia) BRK Crvena Zvezda Belgrade	Stadion Ada Ciganlija	1,000	2013/2014
(Serbia) Kraljevski Beogradski Ragbi Klub (KBRK)			2011/2012 Was BRK at that time
(Serbia) Rugby Club Partizan Belgrade	Stadion Vojna Gimnazija	3,000	2011/2012
(Serbia) Rugby Club Rad Mozzart Belgrade (RK Pobednik)	Stadion Kralj Petar I	5,000	2016/2017
(Serbia) Sportex Rugby Belgrade (Belgrade Region)	Stadion Ada Ciganlija		2015/2016
(Serbia) RK Dorćol			2007/2008
(Slovenia) RFC Bežigrad Ljubljana			2011/2012
(Slovenia) RK Ljubljana		1,000	2019/2020
(Slovenia) RK Olimpija			2008/2009

== Past winners ==
Regional Rugby Championship
Season	Winner	Runner-up
2007–08	(Croatia) RK Nada Split	(Serbia) RK Pobednik
2008–09	(Croatia) RK Nada Split	(Serbia) RK Pobednik
2009–10	(Croatia) RK Nada Split	(Hungary) Esztergomi Vitézek Rugby SE
2010–11	(Croatia) RK Nada Split	(Serbia) RK Pobednik
2011–12	(Croatia) RK Nada Split	(Serbia) RK Pobednik
2012–13	(Croatia) RK Nada Split	(Croatia) RK Zagreb
2013–14	(Croatia) RK Nada Split	(Croatia) HARK Mladost
2014–15	(Bosnia and Herzegovina) RK Čelik Zenica	(Croatia) RK Nada Split
2015–16	(Slovenia) RK Ljubljana	(Croatia) RT Dalmacija
2016–17	(Croatia) RK Nada Split	(Croatia) RT Dalmacija
2017–18	(Croatia) RK Nada Split	(Croatia) RT Dalmacija
2018–19	(Croatia) Zagrebački Ragbi Savez	(Croatia) RT Dalmacija
