= Rugby Union Donau Wien =

RU Donau Wien
- Full name: Rugby Union Donau Wien
- Union: Austrian Rugby Federation
- Nickname(s): Rugby Donau, Piraten
- Founded: 1989
- Region: Vienna, Austria
- Ground: Union-Trendsportzentrum - Meiereistraße 20, 1020 Wien
- President: Ronald Mischek
- Coach: Sebastian Freydell
- Captain(s): Robert Schneider, Karolina Pomej
- League: Erste Österreichische Bundesliga
Team kit

Rugby Union Donau Wien is an Austrian rugby club based in Vienna. The club competes in the Austrian Rugby Bundesliga and fields men’s, women’s, and youth teams.

== History ==
The club was originally founded in 1989 as RC Donau, one of the first youth-focused rugby clubs in Austria. RC Donau quickly rose to prominence, winning youth championships in 1989 and 1991 before progressing into senior competition.

In 1999, RC Donau merged with RC Wien, and the combined side competed under the name '''Rugby Club Donau Wien'''. In 2012/13, following the club’s entry into the SPORTUNION organisation, it adopted its current name '''Rugby Union Donau Wien'''.

== Ground ==
Rugby Union Donau Wien plays at the Union Trendsportzentrum (also referred to as Donau Rugby Park) in Vienna’s Prater, Meiereistraße 20, 1020 Vienna.

== Cross-border competition ==
Since 2023, Donau’s men’s first XV has taken part in the Czech 1. Liga ragby XV (second tier). The club emerged as 1. Liga champions for three consecutive seasons (2023, 2024, 2025). In 2025, Donau succeeded in winning the promotion/relegation playoff and secured promotion to the **Extraliga ragby XV, the top-tier Czech club competition.

In 2015, Rugby Union Donau Ladies broke new ground abroad by competing in a tournament in Brno, becoming the first Austrian women’s team to play in the Czech Republic. That same year, they also toured Ireland to take part in the Kinsale Sevens, returning again in 2017.

Four years later, in 2019, Donau entered the Czech Women’s 15s League as a playing community with RC Tatra Smíchov. The partnership proved successful, with the side winning the league and claiming the Czech championship. Since 2021, Donau has also competed in the Czech Women’s 7s League while continuing to play in the Austrian competition. Today, the club fields teams in both leagues.

== Notable players ==
- Ricci Hennig – In 2022, Donau player Elena Riccarda Hennig (“Ricci”) became the first Austrian woman to play rugby professionally, competing in the 10s Championship in South Africa for the Serengeti Elephants. In 2023, she also played professionally at the Premier Rugby Sevens in the United States.
- Caspar Gabriel – A former Donau youth player who moved to Ireland to attend Terenure College. Described by his coach as “the most talented schoolboy I’ve seen,” he joined the Leinster Rugby Academy in 2024 after representing Leinster Under-19. Gabriel has attracted attention from professional clubs in Ireland and abroad and is on track to become one of Austria’s highest-profile rugby exports.

== Women's rugby ==
Rugby Union Donau Ladies, also known as the Pirates, is Austria’s largest women’s rugby team and the second club in the country to establish a women’s side.

=== History (early years) ===
Rugby Union Donau Ladies was the second women’s team founded in Austria, after Vienna Celtic. Rugby Union Donau Ladies was the second women’s team founded in Austria, after Vienna Celtic. Celtic’s women’s side grew out of a touch rugby team in 2002, although women had already been playing touch in Austria since 1995. The 2002 team included 26 players and became the first official women’s rugby team on record. In 2003, they played their first full-contact matches. To further support development, Renée Carmine-Jones founded a second women’s team at Rugby Union Donau in 2004.

That same year the first unofficial women’s national team match was played. In 2005, the first official Austrian women’s national team entered the European Championship, with five Donau players selected. Early domestic matches were mostly between Celtic and Donau, or occasional fixtures against Hungary and Croatia.

In 2006, the inaugural Austrian Women’s Bundesliga was held with Donau, Celtic, WRCI Innsbruck, and RC Graz. Rugby Union Donau Ladies won the competition, becoming Austria’s first women’s rugby state champions.

=== Milestones ===
- 2004 – First unofficial Austrian women’s national team match.
- 2005 – First official European Championship appearance for Austria, with five Donau players selected.
- 2006 – Donau Ladies win the inaugural Austrian Women’s Bundesliga, becoming the first national champions.

=== Later developments ===
From 2008 to 2013, Donau and Celtic combined forces as the playing community FRU (Frauen Rugby Union) Schönbrunn. In 2012, as FRU Schönbrunn, the team traveled to its first international friendly tournament in Slovakia. Later that year, Donau re-established itself as an independent women’s team.

Donau’s women’s teams also play international friendly tournaments in the Czech Republic, Hungary, and Germany. These competitions have developed into a close network with clubs across Central and Eastern Europe, evolving into the “Five City Tournaments.” Donau both participates in and hosts these events, alongside teams from the Czech Republic, Slovenia, Croatia, and Hungary, to strengthen women’s rugby in the region.

=== Beach rugby ===
The Donau Ladies have also competed in several beach rugby tournaments, most notably the Lignano Beach Rugby Championship, which they won in 2018 and 2022.

== Youth ==
Donau operates a comprehensive youth pathway under the “Mini Piraten/Mini Piratinnen” and “Junior Pirates” banners, fielding U6 through U18 teams that train at the Union Trendsportzentrum in the Prater.

== Honours ==
Note: In Austria, the winner of the national XV league (Bundesliga) is officially recognized as Staatsmeister (national champion) since 2007.

=== As RC Donau (1989–2002) ===
- Austrian Championship (XV) — Men: 1993, 1995, 1996, 1997, 1998, 1999, 2000, 2001, 2002
- Austro-Moravia Cup (XV) — Men: 1997, 1998

=== As Rugby Union Donau Wien (2003–present) ===
==== Men's ====
- Austrian Championship (XV): 2003, 2004, 2005, 2006
- National Championship (XV): 2007, 2008, 2009, 2010, 2011, 2012, 2013, 2014, 2015, 2016, 2017, 2018, 2022, 2025
- Winner Liga ragby XV (Czech Republic): 2023, 2024, 2025
- National Sevens Championship (7s): 2008, 2010

==== Women's ====
- Austrian National Sevens Championship (7s): 2005, 2006, 2007, 2008, 2009, 2010, 2011, 2012, 2013, 2014, 2015, 2016, 2017, 2018, 2019, 2021
- Austrian Women’s Bundesliga (XV): 2006
- Liga ragby XV (Czech Republic): 2019 (as playing community with RC Tatra Smíchov)
- Czech Women’s 7s League: Champions in both Summer and Winter seasons, 2021–2023
- Beach Rugby (Lignano Championship): 2018, 2022
