= 1. Rugby Bundesliga =

Austrian men's rugby union league

The 1. Rugby Bundesliga is the top level of domestic club rugby union competition in Austria.

== History ==
The competition was first contested in 1992, with RC Wien as the first champions.

For the 1993/1994 season, the four strongest Austrian teams competed with two Slovenian teams in the Alpenliga (Alps League), which replaced the Bundesliga. This arrangement was repeated in the 1994/1995 season, with three Austrian teams playing against two Slovenian teams and RK Sisak from Croatia.

The 1995/1996 season was the first time 1. and 2. Bundesligen were played, but reverted to a single league for all clubs in 1996/1997 because of the progress made by the newer clubs. The difference in playing standards was however, too large, and the following two seasons saw three of the Viennese clubs - RC Wien, Vienna Celtic, and RC Lycee - take on three Czech clubs in the Austro-Moravian League. This meant that the remaining clubs battled it out for the Bundesliga.

== Current teams ==
2019–20 season

Location of teams in the 1. Rugby Bundesliga 2019-20

Club	City	Stadium
Donau	Vienna	Sportareal Dirnelwiese
Graz	Graz	Viktor Franz Platz
Slovan Bratislava	Bratislava	
SRC Wien	Vienna	Sportareal Dirnelwiese
Vienna Celtic	Vienna	Sportareal Dirnelwiese (Note: Have also played matches at ASKÖ Sportplatz Atzgersdorf and Neuklosterwiese in Wiener Neustadt.)
Wombats	Wiener Neustadt	

== Results ==
The scores in blue are links to accounts of finals on the site of the Austrian Rugby Federation (ÖRV) - in German

Year	Champion	Score	Runner-up	Place
1993	RC Wien
1994
1995	RC Wien
1996	RC Wien
1997	RC Wien
1998	RC Wien
1999	RC Wien
2000	RC Wien
2001	RC Wien
2002	RC Wien
2003	RC Donau
2004	RC Donau
2005	RC Donau	32-0	Vienna Celtic RFC	Hohe Warte Stadium, Vienna
2006	RC Donau	25-17	RC Lycée Français de Vienne	Großmugl
2007	RC Donau	26-0	Vienna Celtic RFC	Hohe Warte Stadium, Vienna
2008	RC Donau	31-10	RC Innsbruck	Hohe Warte Stadium, Vienna
2009	RC Donau	33-0	RC Innsbruck	Hohe Warte Stadium, Vienna
2010	RC Donau	6-6	RC Stade Viennois	Sportklub Stadium, Vienna

== Performance by club ==
Club	Winners	Runners-up	Winning years
RC Wien	9	N/A	1993, 1995, 1996, 1997, 1998, 1999, 2000, 2001, 2002
RC Donau	8	0	2003, 2004, 2005, 2006, 2007, 2008, 2009, 2010, 2011, 2012, 2013, 2014, 2015, 2016, 2017, 2018, 2022, 2025

=== Regions ===
The following table lists the Austrian rugby champions by region.

Region	Titles	Winning clubs
Vienna	17	Wien (9), Donau (8)

== See also ==
- Rugby union in Austria
