= 2016 Rugby Europe Women's Sevens Conference =

3rd level of international women's rugby sevens competitions

- Host nation: Bosnia and Herzegovina
- Date: 23–24 July 2016

Cup
- Champion: Latvia
- Runner-up: Malta
- Third: Poland

Plate
- Winner: Turkey
- Runner-up: Georgia

Bowl
- Winner: Austria
- Runner-up: Andorra

Shield
- Winner: Bosnia and Herzegovina
- Runner-up: Lithuania

The 2016 Rugby Europe Women's Sevens Conference was the third level of international women's rugby sevens competitions organised by Rugby Europe during 2016. It featured one tournament hosted in Sarajevo, Bosnia and Herzegovina. The winners and runners up, Latvia and Malta respectively, were promoted to the 2017 Trophy series.

== Pool stages ==
=== Pool A ===
Teams	Pld	W	D	L	PF	PA	+/−	Pts
Georgia	3	3	0	0	64	10	+54	9
Luxembourg	3	2	0	1	88	26	+62	7
Slovenia	3	1	0	2	46	46	0	5
Balkan Select VII	3	0	0	3	0	116	-116	3

Matches

23 July 2016
10:00

Georgia	24-0	Balkan Select VII

23 July 2016
10:22

Luxembourg	32-0	Slovenia

23 July 2016
12:56

Luxembourg	51-0	Balkan Select VII

23 July 2016
13:18

Georgia	14-5	Slovenia

23 July 2016
15:52

Slovenia	41-0	Balkan Select VII

23 July 2016
16:14

Georgia	26-5	Luxembourg

=== Pool B ===
Teams	Pld	W	D	L	PF	PA	+/−	Pts
Slovakia	3	3	0	0	133	10	+123	9
Bulgaria	3	2	0	1	51	41	+10	7
Lithuania	3	1	0	2	39	55	-16	5
Serbia	3	0	0	3	0	117	-117	3

Matches

23 July 2016
10:44

Lithuania	0-45	Slovenia

23 July 2016
11:06

Bulgaria	31-0	Serbia

23 July 2016
13:40

Bulgaria	10-36	Slovenia

23 July 2016
14:02

Lithuania	34-0	Serbia

23 July 2016
16:36

Serbia	0-52	Slovenia

23 July 2016
16:58

Lithuania	5-10	Serbia

=== Pool C ===
Teams	Pld	W	D	L	PF	PA	+/−	Pts
Malta	3	0	0	0	99	17	+82	9
Croatia	3	1	0	2	44	50	-6	5
Austria	3	1	0	2	33	68	-35	5
Andorra	3	1	0	2	34	75	-41	5

Matches

23 July 2016
11:28

Croatia	34-5	Andorra

23 July 2016
11:50

Malta	41-5	Austria

23 July 2016
14:24

Malta	34-12	Andorra

23 July 2016
14:46

Croatia	10-21	Austria

23 July 2016
17:20

Austria	7-17	Andorra

23 July 2016
17:42

Croatia	0-24	Malta

=== Pool D ===
Teams	Pld	W	D	L	PF	PA	+/−	Pts
Latvia	3	3	0	0	107	7	+100	9
Turkey	3	2	0	1	103	17	+86	7
Montenegro	3	1	0	2	32	93	-61	5
Bosnia and Herzegovina	3	0	0	3	7	132	-125	3

Matches

23 July 2016
12:12

Latvia	45-0	Montenegro

23 July 2016
12:34

Turkey	55-0	Bosnia and Herzegovina

23 July 2016
15:08

Turkey	41-5	Montenegro

23 July 2016
15:30

Latvia	50-0	Bosnia and Herzegovina

23 July 2016
18:04

Bosnia and Herzegovina	7-27	Montenegro

23 July 2016
18:26

Latvia	12-7	Turkey

=== Knockout stage ===
Shield

Quarter-finals
24 July 2016 – 10:00
Slovenia	20
Bosnia and Herzegovina	5
24 July 2016 – 10:22
Austria	47
Serbia	0
24 July 2016 – 10:44
Montenegro	29
Balkan Select VII	5
24 July 2016 – 11:06
Lithuania	0
Andorra	32

Semi-finals
24 July 2016 – 12:56
Bosnia and Herzegovina	21
Serbia	7
24 July 2016 – 13:18
Balkan Select VII	15
Lithuania	20

Final
24 July 2016 – 16:14
Bosnia and Herzegovina	17
Lithuania	5
Third place
24 July 2016 – 15:52
Serbia	12
Balkan Select VII	5

Bowl

Quarter-finals
24 July 2016 – 10:00
Slovenia	20
Bosnia and Herzegovina	5
24 July 2016 – 10:22
Austria	47
Serbia	0
24 July 2016 – 10:44
Montenegro	29
Balkan Select VII	5
24 July 2016 – 11:06
Lithuania	0
Andorra	32

Semi-finals
24 July 2016 – 13:40
Slovenia	5
Austria	20
24 July 2016 – 14:02
Montenegro	5
Andorra	22

Final
24 July 2016 – 16:58
Austria	5
Andorra	0
Third place
24 July 2016 – 16:36
Slovenia	5
Montenegro	0

Plate

Quarter-finals
24 July 2016 – 11:28
Georgia	0
Turkey	24
24 July 2016 – 11:50
Latvia	39
Bulgaria	0
24 July 2016 – 12:12
Malta	48
Luxembourg	0
24 July 2016 – 12:34
Slovenia	17
Croatia	0

Semi-finals
24 July 2016 – 14:24
Georgia	17
Bulgaria	0
24 July 2016 – 14:46
Luxembourg	15
Croatia	10

Final
24 July 2016 – 17:42
Georgia	10
Luxembourg	22
Third place
24 July 2016 – 17:20
Bulgaria	0
Croatia	17

Cup

Quarter-finals
24 July 2016 – 11:28
Georgia	0
Turkey	24
24 July 2016 – 11:50
Latvia	39
Bulgaria	0
24 July 2016 – 12:12
Malta	48
Luxembourg	0
24 July 2016 – 12:34
Slovenia	17
Croatia	0

Semi-finals
24 July 2016 – 15:08
Turkey	7
Latvia	12
24 July 2016 – 15:30
Malta	14
Slovenia	7

Final
24 July 2016 – 18:26
Latvia	15
Malta	7
Third place
24 July 2016 – 18:04
Turkey	19
Slovenia	5

== Final standings ==
Legend
Promoted to 2017 Trophy series
Invitational team

Rank	Team
1st place, gold medalist(s)	Latvia
2nd place, silver medalist(s)	Malta
3rd place, bronze medalist(s)	Turkey
4	Slovakia
5	Luxembourg
6	Georgia
7	Croatia
8	Bulgaria
9	Austria
10	Andorra
11	Slovenia
12	Montenegro
13	Bosnia and Herzegovina
14	Lithuania
15	Serbia
16	Balkan Select VII
