= Rugby Championship of Serbia =

Serbian Rugby Championship
- Sport: Rugby union
- Instituted: 2006
- Number of teams: 6
- Holders: Rugby Club Partizan (2020/21)
- Most titles: Rugby Club Pobednik / Rad (8 titles)

The Rugby Championship of Serbia is highest level of rugby union competition in Serbia. The league was founded in 2006. after breakup of Serbia and Montenegro.

== History ==
Prior to 1992, teams such as Partizan played in the Rugby Championship of SR Yugoslavia. From the 1992–93 season through until 2005–06, the Serbian teams played in the Serbia and Montenegro Championship. The competition then became the Rugby Championship of Serbia from 2006–07 onwards.

== Teams ==
The teams in the Rugby Championship of Serbia as of 2019 are:

Division A:
- BRK Red Star
- Rad
- Partizan
Division B:
- Vojvodina
- Loznica
- Dinamo 1954
- Vršac
Development clubs:
- Krusevac
- Zmajevi
- Pobednik
- Petrovgrad
- Borac Starcevo

Teams that previously participated in the Serbian Championship include:^{[b]} RK Dinamo Pancevo, RK Dorćol, RK Iron Fortress (from Smederevo), Royal Belgrade and (in Division B) RK Red Star and Balkan Mosquito. Other rugby clubs in Serbia include the junior team Singidunum RK, and the Belgrade Women's rugby club (Ženski ragbi klub Beograd). BRK Red Star also runs a sports program for people with disabilities.

Notes:

^{a} RK Pobednik was renamed RK Rad (Labor RC) in December 2014. The club fields teams in both divisions of the national championship.
^{b} This list might be incomplete.

== Champions ==
Past winners of the Serbian Rugby Championship:

Rugby Championship of Serbia
Season	Winner
2006–07	Rugby Club Pobednik
2007–08	Rugby Club Pobednik
2008–09	Rugby Club Pobednik
2009–10	Rugby Club Pobednik
2010–11	Rugby Club Pobednik
2011–12	Rugby Club Pobednik
2012–13	Rugby Club Pobednik
2013–14	Canceled
2014–15	BRK Crvena Zvezda
2015–16	BRK Crvena Zvezda
2016–17	Rugby Club Rad
2017–18	Rugby Club Partizan
2018–19	Rugby Club Partizan
2019–20	Rugby Club Partizan
2020–21	Rugby Club Partizan

== See also ==
- Rugby union in Serbia
- Rugby Union of Serbia
