= 2019 Rugby Europe Women's Sevens Conference =

International women's rugby sevens tournament

- Hosts: Croatia
- Date: 15–16 June 2019
- Nations: 12

Final positions
- Champions: Moldova
- Runners-up: Denmark
- Third: Austria

Series details
- Matches played: 34

The 2019 Rugby Europe Women's Sevens Conference was the third divisions of Rugby Europe's 2019 sevens season. It was held in Zagreb, Croatia on 15–16 June 2019, with the winner advancing to the European qualifying tournament, as well as the 2020 Women's Sevens Trophy alongside the runner-up.

== Pool stage ==
All times in Central European Summer Time (UTC+02:00)

=== Pool A ===
Team	Pld	W	D	L	PF	PA	PD	Pts
Moldova	3	2	1	0	116	17	+99	8
Austria	3	2	0	1	75	48	+27	7
Malta	3	1	1	1	76	41	+35	6
Slovenia	3	0	0	3	10	171	–161	3

15 June 2019
11:00

Austria	46–5	Slovenia

15 June 2019
11:22

Moldova	12–12	Malta

15 June 2019
13:45

Austria	29–5	Malta

15 June 2019
14:07

Moldova	66–5	Slovenia

15 June 2019
16:30

Austria	0–38	Moldova

15 June 2019
16:52

Malta	59–0	Slovenia

=== Pool B ===
Team	Pld	W	D	L	PF	PA	PD	Pts
Denmark	0	3	0	0	96	0	+96	9
Latvia	0	2	0	1	72	36	+36	7
Lithuania	0	1	0	2	15	53	–38	5
Slovakia	0	0	0	3	0	94	–94	3

15 June 2019
11:44

Latvia	29–5	Lithuania

15 June 2019
12:06

Denmark	41–0	Slovakia

15 June 2019
14:29

Latvia	43–0	Slovakia

15 June 2019
14:51

Denmark	24–0	Lithuania

15 June 2019
17:14

Latvia	0–31	Denmark

15 June 2019
17:36

Slovakia	0–10	Lithuania

=== Pool C ===
Team	Pld	W	D	L	PF	PA	PD	Pts
Andorra	3	3	0	0	87	10	+77	9
Croatia	3	2	0	1	43	31	+12	7
Bulgaria	3	1	0	2	12	53	–41	5
Luxembourg	3	0	0	3	12	60	–48	3

15 June 2019
12:28

Bulgaria	0–41	Andorra

15 June 2019
12:50

Croatia	26–7	Luxembourg

15 June 2019
15:13

Bulgaria	5–0	Luxembourg

15 June 2019
15:35

Croatia	5–17	Andorra

15 June 2019
17:58

Andorra	29–5	Luxembourg

15 June 2019
18:20

Croatia	12–7	Bulgaria

== Knockout stage ==
=== 9th Place ===
Semi-finals
16 June 2019 – 11:28
Bulgaria	41
Slovenia	0
16 June 2019 – 11:50
Luxembourg	31
Slovakia	0

Final
16 June 2019 – 16:30
Bulgaria	7
Luxembourg	12
Fifteenth place
16 June 2019 – 14:43
Slovenia	0
Slovakia	45

=== 5th Place ===
Semi-finals
16 June 2019 – 13:15
Lithuania	0
Croatia	12
16 June 2019 – 13:37
Malta	0
Andorra	17

Fifth place
16 June 2019 – 16:24
Croatia	0
Andorra	21
Seventh place
16 June 2019 – 16:00
Lithuania	10
Malta	20

=== Cup ===
Quarter-finals
16 June 2019 – 10:00
Moldova	38
Lithuania	0
16 June 2019 – 11:06
Latvia	24
Croatia	0
16 June 2019 – 10:22
Denmark	36
Malta	0
16 June 2019 – 10:44
Andorra	0
Austria	5

Semi-finals
16 June 2019 – 13:59
Moldova	15
Latvia	0
16 June 2019 – 14:21
Denmark	22
Austria	0

Final
16 June 2019 – 17:28
Moldova	26
Denmark	12
Third place
16 June 2019 – 16:45
Latvia	10
Austria	15

== Placements ==
Legend
Promoted to 2020 Trophy
and 2019 Olympic qualifying tournament
Promoted to 2020 Trophy

Rank	Team
1st place, gold medalist(s)	Moldova
2nd place, silver medalist(s)	Denmark
3rd place, bronze medalist(s)	Austria
4	Latvia
5	Andorra
6	Croatia
7	Malta
8	Lithuania
9	Luxembourg
10	Bulgaria
11	Slovakia
12	Slovenia
