= Rugby Club Rad =

Serbian rugby union club, based in Belgrade

Rugby club Rad
- Full name: Rugby club Rad
- Founded: 1996 as RC Pobednik 2014 renamed RC Rad
- Location: Belgrade, Serbia
- Ground: Stadion Kralj Petar I (Capacity 6,000)
- President: Marko Kapor
- League: Rugby Championship of Serbia

Official website
- www.rugbyrad.com

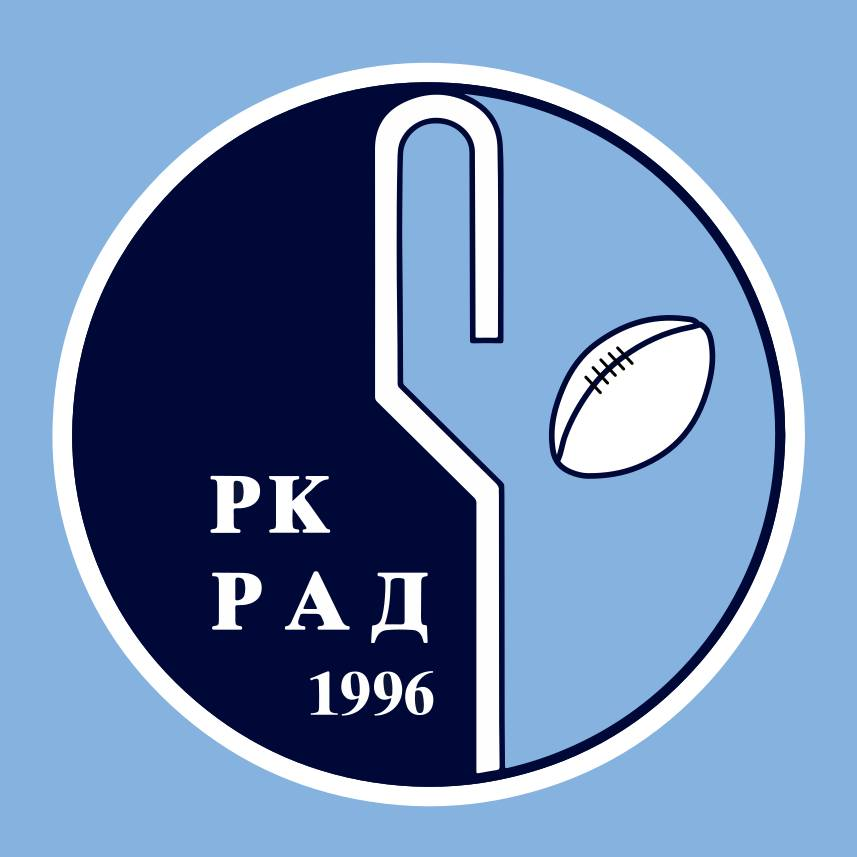

Rugby Club Rad Belgrade (Serbian: Рагби Клуб Рад Београд) is a rugby union club from Belgrade, Serbia. RK Rad, previously known as RK Pobednik, is one of the biggest rugby clubs within the former Yugoslavia, having won ten national championships and seven national cup trophies. The club is a member of the Serbian Rugby Union.

== History ==
1996 RK Pobednik logo.

In December 1996, a group of enthusiasts and lovers of rugby, led by Bosko Strugar, founded Rugby Club Pobednik. The early years were not easy as there were no pitches or club house. However, all members helped develop the club which brought results quickly. In difficult times, the players bought the required equipment and funded travel so the club could survive. The club is now sponsored by Mozzart Sports Betting.

In December 2014 Pobednik was renamed Rad. This was previously the name of its associated junior rugby club, after a link was established with football club FK Rad. In English, Rad translates as "work" or "labour", and the football club was formed by the Serbian construction company of the same name. RK Rad's president Marko Kapor is also on the board of directors of FK Rad. The club wears a blue and white kit.

=== Domestic competitions ===
In the 1997/1998 season Pobednik joined the Rugby Championship of FR Yugoslavia and reached the playoffs. The first game ended with the triumph, with victory over the well-established club KBRK (now BRK Red Star). Ultimately Ragbi Klub Partizan took the championship in that season, but only two years later Pobednik defeated Partizan to become the new States champion. Pobednik won their second title the following year, and extended the winning streak to claim seven straight Championships from 2007 to 2013. Pobednik has also won 4 domestic Cups.

=== Regional league ===
Regional Rugby Championship started in 2007, 3 teams from Serbia, 3 teams from Croatia, 2 teams from Slovenia, 3 teams from Hungary, 2 teams from Bosnia and Herzegovina, one team from Greece and one team from Austria. RC Pobednik were the runners-up in 4 seasons between 2007 and 2012.

== Club honours ==
- Rugby Championship of SR Yugoslavia:

Winners (2): 2000, 2001

- Rugby Championship of Serbia:

Winners (9): 2007, 2008, 2009, 2010, 2011, 2012, 2013, 2017, 2022

- Rugby Cup of Serbia:

Winners (8): 2006, 2009, 2012, 2013, 2017, 2018, 2020, 2022

- Regional Rugby Championship:

Runners Up (4): 2008, 2009, 2011, 2012

=== Records ===
- Most Appearances: Marko Kapor - 113
- Top Points Scorer: Marko Kapor - 543

== Current squad ==
The club has more than one hundred members competing across five categories. The youth sections have been a particularly productive area of the club's development, with players progressing regularly through its ranks. Pobednik, now known as Rad, has produced more national representative players for Serbia than any other club.

== Personnel ==
=== Team officials ===
- President: Marko Kapor
- Technical Director: Marko Jovanović
- Team Manager: Dejan Ranđelović
- Head Coach: Milan Orlović
- Forwards Coach: Marko Ristić
- Backs Coach: Miladin Živanov
- Doctor: Srđan Nikolić
- Youth coaches: Marko Žeravica and Zoran Mičić

=== Club 100 ===
The following players are members of the 100 club, having played 100 or more games for the club:

Kapor Marko, Rastovac Milan, Vuković Goran, Nikolić Srđan, Radulović Vladimir, Labus Jerko, Marković Predrag, Vraneš Predrag, Ristić Marko, Kapor Branko, Orlović Milan, Živanov Miladin, Jovanović Nebojša, Simonović Nemanja, Đukić Vladimir

== Foreign players ==
- (Canada) Greguar Delhyne
- (Samoa) Vincent Schmidt
- (Fiji) Logaivau Mule Apisai
- (England) Stuart Rudge
- (South Africa) Jabulane Tulisani
- (United States) David Ruggery
- (Russia) Dmitrii Fedko

== Notable former players ==
- (Serbia) Jerko Labus
- (Serbia) Goran Vuković
- (Serbia) Srdjan Nikolic
- (Serbia) Milan Rastovac
- (Serbia) Marko Kapor
- (Serbia) Predrag Marković
- (Serbia) Danilo Bulatović
