= 2015 Rugby Europe Women's Sevens – Division B =

- Host nation: Croatia
- Date: 20–21 June 2015

Cup
- Champion: Denmark
- Runner-up: Israel
- Third: Latvia

Plate
- Winner: Turkey
- Runner-up: Malta

Bowl
- Winner: Slovenia
- Runner-up: Serbia

2015 Rugby Europe Women's Sevens – Division B. Denmark won the B Division Tournament and was promoted to Division A along with runner-up Israel for the 2016 Competition. They will replace Georgia and Lithuania who were both Relegated from Division A to Division B for the 2016 Competition.

== Tournament ==
=== Pool stage ===
Key to colours in group tables
Teams that advanced to the Cup Quarterfinal

==== Pool A ====
Teams	Pld	W	D	L	PF	PA	+/−	Pts
Denmark	3	3	0	0	116	0	+116	9
Turkey	3	1	1	1	39	44	−5	6
Luxembourg	3	1	1	1	51	68	−17	6
Montenegro	3	0	0	3	10	104	−94	3

20 June 2015
10:00

Denmark	48–0	Montenegro
	Report

Zagreb

20 June 2015
11:06

Turkey	17–17	Luxembourg
	Report

Zagreb

20 June 2015
13:00

Denmark	46–0	Luxembourg
	Report

Zagreb

20 June 2015
14:06

Turkey	22–5	Montenegro
	Report

Zagreb

20 June 2015
16:00

Luxembourg	34–5	Montenegro
	Report

Zagreb

20 June 2015
17:06

Denmark	22–0	Turkey
	Report

Zagreb

==== Pool B ====
Teams	Pld	W	D	L	PF	PA	+/−	Pts
Croatia	3	3	0	0	72	5	+67	9
Malta	3	1	1	1	42	27	+15	6
Bulgaria	3	1	1	1	41	39	+2	6
Slovenia	3	0	0	3	0	84	−84	3

20 June 2015
10:22

Croatia	30–0	Slovenia
	Report

Zagreb

20 June 2015
11:28

Malta	12–12	Bulgaria
	Report

Zagreb

20 June 2015
13:22

Croatia	27–0	Bulgaria
	Report

Zagreb

20 June 2015
14:28

Malta	25–0	Slovenia
	Report

Zagreb

20 June 2015
16:22

Bulgaria	29–0	Slovenia
	Report

Zagreb

20 June 2015
17:28

Croatia	15–5	Malta
	Report

Zagreb

==== Pool C ====
Teams	Pld	W	D	L	PF	PA	+/−	Pts
Israel	3	3	0	0	108	12	+96	9
Latvia	3	2	0	1	84	24	+60	7
Serbia	3	1	0	2	10	86	−76	5
Austria	3	0	0	3	0	80	−80	3

20 June 2015
10:44

Israel	41–0	Austria
	Report

Zagreb

20 June 2015
11:50

Latvia	43–0	Serbia
	Report

Zagreb

20 June 2015
13:44

Israel	43–0	Serbia
	Report

Zagreb

20 June 2015
14:50

Latvia	29–0	Austria
	Report

Zagreb

20 June 2015
16:44

Serbia	10–0	Austria
	Report

Zagreb

20 June 2015
17:50

Israel	24–12	Latvia
	Report

Zagreb

=== Knockout stage ===
==== Bowl ====
Semi-finals
21 June 2015 – Zagreb
Serbia	32
Montenegro	5
21 June 2015 – Zagreb
Austria	5
Slovenia	10

Final
21 June 2015 – Zagreb
Serbia	5
Slovenia	10
Third place
21 June 2015 – Zagreb
Montenegro	10
Austria	15

==== Plate ====
Quarter-finals
21 June 2015 – Zagreb
Denmark	34
Luxembourg	0
21 June 2015 – Zagreb
Latvia	22
Malta	12
21 June 2015 – Zagreb
Israel	24
Bulgaria	14
21 June 2015 – Zagreb
Croatia	10
Turkey	7

Semi-finals
21 June 2015 – Zagreb
Luxembourg	5
Malta	21
21 June 2015 – Zagreb
Bulgaria	7
Turkey	14

Final
21 June 2015 – Zagreb
Malta	7
Turkey	10
Third place
21 June 2015 – Zagreb
Luxembourg	5
Bulgaria	14

==== Cup ====
Quarter-finals
21 June 2015 – Zagreb
Denmark	34
Luxembourg	0
21 June 2015 – Zagreb
Latvia	22
Malta	12
21 June 2015 – Zagreb
Israel	24
Bulgaria	14
21 June 2015 – Zagreb
Croatia	10
Turkey	7

Semi-finals
21 June 2015 – Zagreb
Denmark	15
Latvia	10
21 June 2015 – Zagreb
Israel	20
Croatia	12

Final
21 June 2015 – Zagreb
Denmark	27
Israel	19
Third place
21 June 2015 – Zagreb
Latvia	10
Croatia	15

=== Division B standings ===
Legend
Qualified for the Rugby Europe repechage tournament and Promoted to Division A for 2016.
Promoted to Division A for 2016.

Rank	Team
1st place, gold medalist(s)	Denmark
2nd place, silver medalist(s)	Israel
3rd place, bronze medalist(s)	Croatia
4	Latvia
5	Turkey
6	Malta
7	Bulgaria
8	Luxembourg
9	Slovenia
10	Serbia
11	Austria
12	Montenegro
