= Rugby in Serbia =

Rugby in Serbia may refer to:

- Rugby union in Serbia
- Rugby league in Serbia
