= 1. Oberösterreichischer Rugby Sport Club =

- Full name: 1. Oberösterreichischer Rugby Sport Club
- Union: Austrian Rugby Federation
- Founded: 2000
- Location: Linz, Austria
- Ground: Sportpark Pichling
- President: (Austria) Stefan Rothschedl
- Coach: (Austria) Martin Kühr
- Captain: (Austria) Roman Pröslmayr
- League: Erste Österreichische Bundesliga
Team kit

1. Oberösterreichischer Rugby Sport Club (also known as RC McDonald's Oberösterreich for sponsorship reasons) is an Austrian rugby club in Linz.

== History ==
The club was founded in 2000 by a Czech, Jaromir Jungmann, who had played rugby in Prague before moving to Linz. Their first match was on 17 June 2000 in Vienna.

== Honours ==
- Zweite Österreichische Bundesliga
  - 2008
