= Rugby Club Krusevac =

Serbian rugby union team, based in Kruševac

(Serbia) Rugby Club Krusevac
- Full name: Рагби клуб Крушевац; Ragbi Klub Krusevac
- Nickname: Wolves
- Founded: 1992; 34 years ago
- Location: Kruševac, Serbia
- League: Rugby Championship of Serbia,

Official website
- rugbykrusevac.org/news.php

Rugby Club Krusevac, (Serbian: Рагби клуб Крушевац) is a rugby union team from Kruševac, Serbia. The club is a member of the Rugby Union of Serbia. The team wears an orange and black strip.

== History ==
The first rugby ball in Krusevac brought Dragan Vujasinovic, officer of Yugoslav People Army, in October 1982. Next year he started section in military camp "July th". Club with same name was formed in March 1984 and played till the end of 1986.

On 19 August 1992, a group of former players from the "July 7th Rugby Club" formed Rugby Club Krusevac. The first President was Mr. Ljubisa Popovic. Club was mainly focused on work with young players. The first ever Serbian born player who played in England, Aleksandar Mihajlovic, was product of RC Krusevac. He played for Bedford Athletic RUFC, Bedford Blues, Launceston RFC in UK and County Carlow in Ireland.

Since 1992 RC Krusevac produced 13 senior representatives of Serbia and more than 20 U18 and U20 representatives.

The first female team in Serbia was formed in Krusevac, in September 2005.

From 2001. till 2013. RC Krusevac organized international sevens tournament which gathered teams from Fiji, UK, Romania, Polska, Hungary, Belgie, Australia, Bulgaria, Bosnia&Herzegovina, Montenegro...

Due to the lack of money in last couple of years RC Krusevac is oriented on work with young categories.
