= Vojvodina Rugby Club =

Serbian rugby union team, based in Novi Sad

(Serbia) Vojvodina Rugby Club
- Full name: Рагби клуб Војводина; Ragbi Klub Vojvodina
- Nickname: RKV
- Founded: 2001; 25 years ago
- Location: Novi Sad, Serbia
- League: Rugby Championship of Serbia

Official website
- www.vojvodinaragbiklub.rs

The Vojvodina Rugby Club, (Serbian: Рагби клуб Војводинаm) is a rugby union team from Novi Sad, Serbia. The club is a member of the Rugby Union of Serbia. The team wears a red and white strip.

== History ==
In September 2001, a group of enthusiasts and lovers of rugby founded Ragbi Klub Vojvodina.

== Current squad ==
Senior Squad:

Player
Nemanja Jakovljevic
Vukasin Radojcic
Jovan Suscevic
Goran Porobic
Miodrag Marin
Boris Sijan
Nenad Jojic
Aleksandar Slavkovic
Dejan Sic
Zoran Janjic
Marko Zecevic
Marko Novosel
Rajko Jankovic
Predrag Banic
Marko Paklović
