= RC Krems =

Austrian rugby union club, based in Krems an der Donau

- Full name: Rugby Club Krems
- Union: Austrian Rugby Federation
- Location: Krems an der Donau, Austria
- Ground: Ausportplatz
Team kit

RC Krems is an Austrian rugby club in Krems an der Donau. They currently focus most of their efforts on sevens and tens, but also play friendly matches.

== History ==
From 2007 up to 2010, they teamed up with Wombats RC and played as the Niederösterreich XV.
