= Rugby Club Balkan Mosquito =

Serbian rugby union team

- Full name: Рагби клуб Балкански комарац Ragbi Klub Balkanski Komarac
- Nickname(s): Zarkovo
- Founded: 1984
- Location: Belgrade, Serbia
- Ground(s): FK Zarkovo
- League(s): Rugby Championship of Serbia,

Official website
- rcbm.rs

Rugby Club Balkan Mosquito, (Serbian: Рагби клуб Балкански комарац) is a rugby union team from Belgrade, Serbia. The club is a member of the Rugby Union of Serbia. The team wears a black and green strip.

== History ==
In June 1984, a group of enthusiasts and lovers of rugby led by Milanko Predrag founded Ragbi Klub Balkanski Komarac.

== Club honours ==
Rugby Cup of SR Yugoslavia: Runner-up (2): 1994,1996

== Current squad ==
Senior Squad:

Player
Selimir Tomic
Nikola Radojcic
Dejan Manojlovic
Kosta Smiljanic
Aleksandar Milovanovic
Miroslav Zarkov
Stefan Novakovic
Nikola Kostadinovic
Dusan Perunicic
Branislav Jerotic
Marko Djordjevic
Djordje Gak
Nikola Jankovic
Joko Poleksic
