= HARK Mladost =

Croatian rugby union club, based in Zagreb

(Croatia) HARK Mladost
- Founded: January 17, 1954; 72 years ago
- Location: Zagreb, Croatia
- Ground(s): Krtičnjak, Jarunska Ulica 5
- Coach: Ivan Šuta
- League: Prvenstvo Hrvatske u ragbiju
- 2014–15: 2nd

Official website
- www.mladost-rugby.hr

Croatian Academic Rugby Club Mladost (also known as just HARK Mladost) is a Croatian rugby union club located in Zagreb, Croatia. They play in the First Croatian Rugby league. Founded in 1954 as Hrvatski Akademski Ragbi Klub Mladost, they are the oldest rugby club in Croatia and have been responsible for introducing rugby to the Region. The club is part of the academic sports club Mladost. The club was founded on January 17, 1954, at the inaugural meeting in the Great Hall of the Technical Faculty in Zagreb. This date is considered the formal beginning of rugby union in Croatia. The club plays at the Mladost Sports Park in Zagreb.

== History ==
It all started in 1953 when the part of the athletes and rowers of Mladost conceived the idea of playing rugby, which was known only from stories of those who at the time traveled to the United Kingdom or France.

The first teacher and coach was Nikola Nick Kopajtić who returned to Zagreb from Canada with knowledge about the game and taught students that were willing to learn. At that time they played only friendly matches because there was no official competition. A significant date in the history of the club was 11.29.1954. when the Maksimir stadium in Zagreb before more than 10,000 spectators played its first international match. The game was against a selection of the British occupational forces in Austria (BTA). The result was 14:11 for the guests from Great Britain. For Mladost played: Branko Stimac Vladimir Krišković, Michael Radja, Slavko Mrkoci, Đeki Srbljenovic, Branko Stimac, Ivica Payer, Ziga Marinkov, Rajko Müller, Boris Banašin, Willie Franjković, Boris Korenčić Zivko Skroza, and Branko Arsic.

1957 saw the first organized championship of Yugoslavia, which was won by Team Jedinstva from Pancevo, and Mladost was the runner-up. It is interesting that the Rugby Club Jedinstva was established on the same day as the Croatian Academic rugby club Mladost. The very next year, 1958 Mladost won the Champion Title, and they managed to be vice-champions in 1960, 1962, 1963, 1965, 1972. Mladost played ten times in the finals and won the Cup in 1959, 1961, and 1967.

== Logo ==
Since 1978, the trademark of HARK MLADOST is the Mladost Mole. In one "hand" the mole is shown holding a rugby ball, the other is in the air with his fingers in a "V" sign.

Mladost paved the foundation and cemented the history of rugby in Croatia and in neighboring countries. Players of Mladost encouraged the establishment or founded many other clubs in the region. Some include: RK "Nada" Split (M.Rađa), RK "Lokomotiva" (Ž.Skroza), RK "Zagreb" (R.Bartolić), KS "ploče" (I.Batinović), RK "Čelik" Zenica-BiH (S.Kapetanović) RK "Ljubljana" -Slovenia (S.Tartaglia), ARK "Zrinski" Zagreb (Z.Sumajstorčić), RK "Zadar" (M.Zubak).

Juniors Youth (U-18) won the Croatian Championship 2007 victory against Nada Split 28:10 (24.11.2007.) Club headquarters is in Tesla 10 / III, in Zagreb.

== Trophies ==
=== Championships ===
- Croatian champions (1):
  - 2019–20
- Yugoslav champions (1):
  - 1958

=== Cups ===
- Croatian cup (3):
  - 2015, 2018, 2020
- Yugoslav cup (4):
  - 1959, 1961, 1962, 1967

== See also ==
- Mladost (sports society)
- Regional Rugby Championship
- Rugby union in Yugoslavia
- Rugby union in Croatia
- RK Nada Split
- Zagreb County
