= Brendon Winslow =

Brendon Winslow (born 30 August 1969) is a New Zealand rugby player of Croatian descent.

Brendon Ricky Winslow was born in Henderson, Auckland, New Zealand. His family lineage is through Jelavic and Srhoj families. Winslow coached Nada Rugby Club (Ragbi Klub Nada) in Split, Croatia from 1995 through to 1998. Winslow was the first New Zealander of Croatian descent to play rugby for Croatia. He first played for Croatia in 1995 (against Luxembourg) and his final test match was in 2004. Winslow currently resides in Queensland, Australia and is the Croatian rugby scout for Australia.

Brendon married Marjana Winslow (née Lozancic) and due to a certain life event, he created a blog that can be found at Woodstockbones.com. This blog contains stories about cancer entering their lives, funny gift wrapped presents and pets amongst other things. The blog, particularly The Cancer Chronicles section has been known to make people laugh and cry. The title of this blog is Woodstockbones.com.

Brendon wrote a children's book titled Ana & Endo Adventures that was loosely based on actual events, although it's in a fairytale format. This book can be found on Kindle.
