= Croatian Rugby Federation =

Sports national governing body

Hrvatski ragbijaški savez
- Sport: Rugby union
- Founded: 1 April 1962; 64 years ago
- World Rugby affiliation: 1992
- President: (Croatia) Dragutin Kamenski
- Men's coach: (New Zealand) Milan Yelavich
- Website: www.rugby.hr

The Croatian Rugby Federation (Croatian: Hrvatski ragbijaški savez) is the governing body for rugby union in Croatia.

== History ==
The Croatian Rugby Federation was founded in 1962 as a domestic governing body in the Socialist Federal Republic of Yugoslavia under the control of the Yugoslavia Rugby Federation. In the 1970s and 1980s, the Croatian Rugby Federation would often host New Zealand touring clubs due to the Croatian diaspora in New Zealand. In 1991, while still part of Yugoslavia, the Croatian Rugby Federation appealed to South Africa, Australia, New Zealand and a handful of other countries looking for players with Croatian ancestry though this was unsuccessful. Following Croatian independence in 1992, the Federation became an independent national governing body with them joining the International Rugby Football Board (IRFB). In 1995 with assistance from the Croatian Olympic Committee, the Federation reached out for New Zealand coaches with Croatian ancestry. By 1999, they approached New Zealanders with Croatian grandparents to play for the Croatia national rugby union team for the 1999 Rugby World Cup qualifiers. Due to Croatia failing to qualify, fewer New Zealand based players were approached in favour of domestic growth programme.

In 2016, the Croatian Rugby Federation gained recognition from the European Union for pioneering a campaign against gender based violence in sport. In 2022, the Croatian Rugby Federation appealed to the President of Croatia Zoran Milanović for assistance with growing rugby in Croatia, due to a lack of available rugby pitches and lack of understanding from national institutions leading to clubs mostly renting pitch time from association football clubs.

== Teams ==
=== Men ===
- Croatia - the national men's rugby union team.
- 7s - the national men's rugby union seven-a-side team.

=== Women ===
- Croatia - women's national rugby union team.
- 7s - national women's rugby sevens team.

== See also ==
- Croatia national rugby union team
- Rugby union in Croatia
