= Rugby union at the 1993 Mediterranean Games =

Rugby at the 1993 Mediterranean Games
- Dates: 17 – 25 June 1993

Rugby union was one of several sports at the 1993 Mediterranean Games. This Mediterranean Games was held in Languedoc-Roussillon, France. Only men's teams participated in the rugby tournament.

== Medalists ==
Event	Gold	Silver	Bronze
Men's Competition	France	Italy	Spain

== Group matches ==
Team	G	W	D	L	GF	GA	Diff	Points
France	4	4	0	0	298	17	+281	8
Italy	4	3	0	1	190	57	+133	6
Spain	4	1	1	2	75	108	−33	3
Croatia	4	1	0	3	62	272	−210	2
Morocco	4	0	1	3	27	198	−171	1

June 17, 1993

Croatia	11 – 76	Italy
	Report

Stade Aimé-Giral, Perpignan
Referee: Alain Fernandez (France)
June 17, 1993

Morocco	6 – 6	Spain
	Report

Stade Albert Domec, Carcassonne
June 19, 1993

France	126 – 6	Croatia
	Report

Stade Aimé-Giral, Perpignan
June 19, 1993

Morocco	9 – 70	Italy
	Report

Stade Albert Domec, Carcassonne
Referee: Yves Peyrelongue (France)
June 21, 1993

France	86 – 0	Morocco
	Report

Complexe sportif Michel-Millet, Agde
June 21, 1993

Italy	38 – 6	Spain
	Report

Stade Aimé-Giral, Perpignan
Referee: Yves Peyrelongue (France)
June 23, 1993

Croatia	36 – 12	Morocco

Parc des Sports et de l'Amitié, Narbonne
June 23, 1993

France	55 – 5	Spain
	Report

Parc des Sports et de l'Amitié, Narbonne
June 25, 1993

Croatia	9 – 58	Spain
	Report

Stade de la Méditerranée, Béziers
June 25, 1993

France	31 – 6	Italy
	Report

Stade de la Méditerranée, Béziers
Referee: Marc Desclaux (France)

== Standings ==
Rank	Team
1st place, gold medalist(s)	France
2nd place, silver medalist(s)	Italy
3rd place, bronze medalist(s)	Spain
4	Croatia
5	Morocco
