= Rugby union at the 1979 Mediterranean Games =

Rugby at the 1979 Mediterranean Games
- Dates: 16 – 22 September 1979

Rugby union was one of several sports at the 1979 Mediterranean Games. This Mediterranean Games was held in Split, Yugoslavia. Only men's teams participated in the rugby tournament.

== Medalists ==
Event	Gold	Silver	Bronze
Men's Competition	France	Italy	Morocco

== Preliminary round ==
=== Group A ===
Team	G	W	D	L	GF	GA	Diff	Points
Italy	2	2	0	0	26	16	+10	4
Morocco	2	1	0	1	23	18	+5	2
Spain	2	0	0	2	17	32	−15	0

September 16, 1979

Spain	8 – 16	Morocco

Stadion Stari plac, Split
Referee: Constantin Udrea (Romania)
September 18, 1979

Italy	16 – 9	Spain
	Report

Gradski sportski centar, Makarska
Referee: Jean Claude Doulcet (France)
September 20, 1979

Italy	10 – 7	Morocco
	Report

Gradski sportski centar, Makarska
Referee: Roger Quittenton (England)

=== Group B ===
Team	G	W	D	L	GF	GA	Diff	Points
France	2	2	0	0	190	9	+181	4
Yugoslavia	2	1	0	1	29	86	−57	2
Tunisia	2	0	0	2	3	127	−124	0

September 16, 1979

Yugoslavia	23 – 0	Tunisia

Stadion Stari plac, Split
September 18, 1979

France	104 – 3	Tunisia
	Report

Stadion Stari plac, Split
September 20, 1979

Yugoslavia	6 – 86	France

Stadion Stari plac, Split
Attendance: 5,000
Referee: Constantin Udrea (Romania)

== Final round ==
- September 22, 1979 — 5th/6th place

Spain	63 – 0	Tunisia

Stadion Stari plac, Split
- September 22, 1979 — Bronze Medal Match

Morocco	22 – 7	Yugoslavia

Stadion Stari plac, Split
- September 22, 1979 — Gold Medal Match

France	38 – 12	Italy
	Report

Gradski sportski centar, Makarska
Referee: Roger Quittenton (England)

== Standings ==
Rank	Team
1st place, gold medalist(s)	France
2nd place, silver medalist(s)	Italy
3rd place, bronze medalist(s)	Morocco
4	Yugoslavia
5	Spain
6	Tunisia
