= Rugby Club Red Star =

Serbian rugby union team

- Full name: Рагби Клуб Црвена Звезда; Ragbi Klub Crvena Zvezda
- Nickname(s): RK Red Star
- Founded: 2011
- Disbanded: 2013
- Location: Belgrade, Serbia
- Coach(es): Bozidar Jelic
- League(s): Rugby Championship of Serbia (B Division)

Rugby Club Red Star, (Serbian Cyrillic: Рагби Клуб Црвена Звезда), is a former rugby union team from Belgrade, Serbia. The club was a member of the Serbian Rugby Union. The team had a red and white strip.

Its name Crvena zvezda means Red Star, but the club was not formed by the Red Star Belgrade sports society, having been registered in the suburb of Zemun as an independent club.

== Squads ==
Former RK Red Star Senior Squad from 2012
Player	Position
Radoslav Aleksic	Prop
Dusan Vestic	Prop
Milos Joksimovic	Prop
Pavle Andjelic	Hooker
Milan Smileski	Hooker
Risto Elezovic	Lock
Aleksandar Zupanjac	Lock
Slobodan Milenkovic	Lock
Nemanja Elezovic	Lock
Dusan Novakovic	Lock
Nemanja Babic	Flanker
Manojlo Lukic	Flanker
Milos Aleksovski	Flanker
Igor Dimcic	Number 8
Branimir Reljic	Scrum half
Nikola Tatic	Fly-half
Stefan Zeljkic	Wing
Petar Bucan	Wing
Borivoje Dencic	Wing
Ratko Drinic	Wing
Sava Milosevic	Wing
Milos Milanko	Center
Dusan Januzovic	Center
Borivoje Dencic	Wing
Vojkan Nikolic	Wing
Nenad Matejic	Fullback
Uros Jovanovic	Fullback
