= Royal Belgrade Rugby Club =

Serbian rugby union club, based in Belgrade

- KBRK logo
- Full name: Краљевски Београдски Рагби Клуб; Kraljevski Beogradski Ragbi Klub
- Nickname: KBRK
- Founded: 2014 (estd. Royal Belgrade R.C.) 1982 (orig. Belgrade R.C.)
- Location: Belgrade, Serbia
- League: Rugby Championship of Serbia

Official website
- mojklub.rs/kbrk/

The Royal Belgrade Rugby Club, known as KBRK, (Serbian: Краљевски Београдски Рагби Клуб) is a rugby union team from Belgrade, Serbia. The club was formed in 2014 after a split from the original BRK (Belgrade Rugby Club), which had been founded in 1982. The KBRK is a member of the Rugby Union of Serbia. The team wears a yellow and black kit.

== History ==
The original Belgrade Rugby Club (BRK) was founded on December 20, 1982. The team colours were blue and white and the logo featured a sparrow (Dživdžan). In the early 1990s the club was renamed the Royal Belgrade Rugby Club (KBRK) with the patronage of Prince Alexander II Karađorđević. The team's colours became yellow, brown, and white and the sparrow was replaced by a crown. As KBRK, the club was successful in the nineties and noughties.

In 2012 the club's executive committee decided to return to the name of BRK. The word Royal was removed from the club's name, the colours were reverted to blue and white and a re-styled sparrow replaced the crown. In 2014, the Belgrade Rugby Club (BRK) became Belgrade Rugby Club Red Star (BRK Crvena Zvezda) or BRK Red Star, and the colours were changed to red and white.

A group of former BRK-KBRK members and players were unhappy with these changes and, led by Danijem Stricevicem, decided to split away. A new club was formed under the Royal Belgrade Rugby Club (KBRK) name in 2014.

== Club honours ==
The new KBRK does not claim the history of the previous BRK-KBRK, as listed below. — For details on the original Belgrade Rugby Club, see: Belgrade Rugby Club Red Star.

ROYAL BELGRADE RUGBY CLUB (2014–):

n/a

ROYAL BELGRADE RUGBY CLUB (1994–2012):

Rugby Championship of SR Yugoslavia:

Winners (1): 1995

Rugby Cup of Serbia:

Winners (2): 2004, 2010

== Records ==
ROYAL BELGRADE RUGBY CLUB (2014–):

n/a

ROYAL BELGRADE RUGBY CLUB (1994–2012):

Most Appearances: Mijuskovic M. - 238
Top Points Scorer: Jelic V. - 543

== Squad ==
Senior Squad: |

Player	Position
Denis Culahovic	Back
Alen Culahovic	Back
Nikola Davidovic	Forward
Borivoje Dencic	Back
Radivoj Cosic	Back
Jozef Djefri	Forward
Mladen Gajic	Forward
Dragan Grubic	Forward
Nenad Ivanovic	Forward
Aleksandar Janjic	Forward
Marko Januzovic	Back
Robert Lajtman	Back
Aleksandar Mladenovic	Back
Mihajlo Pesic	Back
Nemanja Pesic	Forward
Nikola Savic	Back
Nemanja Urosevic	Back
Nikola Stosic	Back
