= RK Livonia =

Latvian rugby club

Regbija klubs Livonia
- Founded: 2007
- Location: Ropaži Municipality, Latvia
- Ground: Upesciema stadions
- President: (Latvia) Vigo Valdavs
- Coach(es): (Latvia) Mārcis Rullis (Sweden) Niel Johnson
- Captain: (Argentina) Enzo Ignacio Beltramino
Team kit

RK Livonia is a Latvian rugby club based in the village of Upesciems in Ropaži Municipality near the capital Riga. The name of the club refers to the historic region of Livonia (now Vidzeme) in which the municipality is located.

== History ==
The club was founded in 2007.
