= RC Innsbruck =

Austrian rugby union club, based in Innsbruck

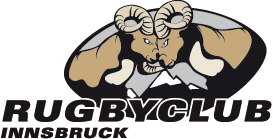
- Full name: Rugby Club Innsbruck
- Union: Austrian Rugby Federation
- Founded: 1997; 29 years ago
- Location: Innsbruck, Austria
- Ground: Fenner Stadion
- President: (France) Jérémie Dejean de la Bâtie
- Coach: (Austria) Johann Trojer
- Captain: (Austria) Dieter Albert
- League: Erste Österreichische Bundesliga
1st kit	2nd kit

Official website
- www.rugby-innsbruck.at

RC Innsbruck is an Austrian rugby union club in Innsbruck, founded in 1997.

== Titles ==
- Austrian Sevens Championships

2006

== Players ==
=== Internationally Capped Players ===
- (Austria) Dieter Albert
- (Austria) Gert Waizer
