= Belgrade Rugby Club Red Star =

Serbian rugby union club, based in Belgrade

(Serbia) Belgrade Rugby Club Red Star
- Full name: Београдски рагби клуб Црвена звезда Beogradski Ragbi Klub Crvena Zvezda
- Nickname: BRK Crvena Zvezda
- Founded: 2014; 12 years ago (BRK Red Star); 1982; 44 years ago (original BRK)
- Location: Belgrade, Serbia
- Ground: Ada Ciganlija
- Coach: Aleksandar Poprecica
- Captain: Boris Martic
- League(s): Rugby Championship of Serbia, Regional Rugby Championship

Official website
- www.brkcrvenazvezda.com

Belgrade Rugby Club Red Star, (Serbian: Београдски рагби клуб Црвена звезда), is a rugby union team from Belgrade, Serbia. The club is a member of the Rugby Union of Serbia. The club is also member of the Red Star Sports Society (Sportsko Drustvo Crvena Zvezda). The team wears a red and white strip.

== History ==
The original Belgrade Rugby Club (BRK) was founded on 20 December 1982. The team colours were blue and white and the logo featured a sparrow (Dživdžan). In the early 1990s the club was renamed the Royal Belgrade Rugby Club (KBRK) with the patronage of Prince Alexander II Karađorđević. The team's colours became yellow, brown, and white and the sparrow was replaced by a crown. As KBRK, the club was successful in the nineties and noughties.

In 2012 the club's executive committee decided to return to the name of BRK. The word Royal was removed from the club's name, the colours were reverted to blue and white and a re-styled sparrow replaced the crown. In 2014, the Belgrade Rugby Club (BRK) became Belgrade Rugby Club Red Star (BRK Crvena Zvezda) or BRK Red Star.

A group of former BRK-KBRK members and players were unhappy with this change and, led by Danijem Stricevicem, decided to split away. A new club was formed under the Royal Belgrade Rugby Club (KBRK) name in 2014.

== Club honours ==
In total, the club has won 2 National Championships and 3 National Cups:

BELGRADE RUGBY CLUB RED STAR (2014–)

Rugby Championship of Serbia:

Winners (2): 2015, 2016

Rugby Cup of Serbia:

Winners (2): 2014, 2016

ROYAL BELGRADE RUGBY CLUB (1994–2012):

Rugby Championship of SR Yugoslavia:

Winners (1): 1995

Rugby Cup of Serbia:

Winners (2): 2004, 2010

== Current squad ==
KBRK (1994–2012)

BRK (2012–14)

Former logos used by the Belgrade Rugby Club

Senior Squad:

- (Serbia) Vladimir Ambrus
- (Serbia) Andrej Banduka
- (Serbia) Bojan Belic
- (Serbia) Petar Vasic
- (Serbia) Aleksandar Madjanovic
- (Serbia) Andrija Jankovic
- (Serbia) Andrija Panic
- (Serbia) Nikola Arsic
- (Serbia) Aleksandar Djordjevic
- (Serbia) Danijel Kajan
- (Serbia) Aleksandar Nedeljkovic
- (Serbia) Vitor Ljubicic
- (Serbia) Ivan Rodic
- (Serbia) Vlastimir Sretenovic
- (Serbia) Marko Jacimovic
- (Serbia) Marko Joksimovic
- (Serbia) Vedran Brkic
- (Serbia) Dejan Karatrajovski
