= RK Čelik =

Ragbi klub Čelik
- Nickname: Čelik (Steel)
- Founded: 5 March 1972 (as RK Zenica)
- Location: Zenica, Bosnia and Herzegovina
- Ground: Sportski center Kamberovića polje
- President: Tarik Sarajlić
- Coach: Ermin Mušinović
Team kit

RK Čelik is a Bosnian rugby club based in Zenica. They are the most successful team in the country, having won all Bosnian cup and championship titles since Rugby Federation of Bosnia and Herzegovina was formed in 1992, as well as the Rugby Championship of Yugoslavia 7 times, which made them second most successful club in the former country.

== History ==
The club was founded on 5 March 1972 as RK Zenica before changing their name to RK Čelik in 1978.
