= Latvia national rugby union team =

National rugby union team

Latvia
- Union: Latvian Rugby Federation
- Head coach: (Latvia) Mārcis Rullis
- Captain: Elmārs Šefanovskis
- Top scorer: Roberts Džo Davidsons (209 points)
First colours

World Rugby ranking
- Current: 63 (as of 20 October 2025)
- Highest: 58 (12 August 2019)

First international
- Latvia 3 - 28 Georgia (Georgia (country)) (1992-07-19)

Biggest win
- Latvia 89 - 0 Bulgaria (1997-05-10)

Biggest defeat
- Latvia 3 - 57 Lithuania (2011-04-30)

World Cup
- Appearances: 0
- Website: https://rugby-latvia.lv/page/v-r15-izlase

The Latvia national rugby union team (Latvian: Latvijas regbija XV izlase or Latvijas regbija-15 izlase) represents Latvia at the sport of rugby union. They are governed by the Latvijas Regbija federācija and have been playing international rugby since the early 1990s. They have played most of their games in the Daugava Stadium in Riga or the Baldone Stadium in Baldone, Ķekava Municipality.

Currently, the team competes in the Rugby Europe Conference Pool A. The national side is currently ranked 63rd in the world (as of 20 October 2025). The current head coach since 21 October is former Latvian bobsledder Mārcis Rullis, who replaced fellow Latvian Kristaps Staņa.

== History ==
With rugby union in Latvia introduced in 1960 during the Soviet occupation, the national team was formed soon after the restoration of independence. In 1991 Latvia joined the International Rugby Football Board and in 1992 - the Fédération Internationale de Rugby Amateur. The first international game took place against Georgia on 19 July 1992, ending in a 3–28 loss. In 1993, the team entered its first tournament, the 1995 Rugby World Cup European qualification.

Rugby has increased in popularity in Latvia recently due to a rise in form. Despite minimal playing numbers, Latvia continues to compete at a high level and had an outside chance of finishing top of Division 2A of the European Nations Cup in 2008. However, their hopes took a massive blow, when they failed to capitalise on Poland's surprise home defeat to Croatia, losing 16-13 to Malta in Paola. Latvia is an improving rugby team as now more players are playing in Russia, Germany, and Canada.

Latvia won the 2018–19 Rugby Europe Conference 2 North and was promoted to Rugby Europe Conference 1 North for the 2019–20 season. Conference 1 North became Conference Pool A for the 2023–24 season, with Latvia winning the pool, although not advancing to the Rugby Europe Trophy division.

== Overall record ==
Below is a table of the representative rugby matches played by a Latvia national XV at test level up until 31 October 2025, updated after match with Norway.

Against	Played	Won	Lost	Drawn	Win percentage
Andorra	6	4	2	0	66.67%
Austria	3	3	0	0	100%
Belgium	2	1	1	0	50%
Bulgaria	1	1	0	0	100%
Croatia	8	2	6	0	25%
Cyprus	2	2	0	0	100%
Czech Republic	4	0	4	0	0%
Denmark	10	6	4	0	60%
Estonia	1	1	0	0	100%
Finland	4	2	1	1	50%
Georgia	1	0	1	0	0%
Germany	2	0	2	0	0%
Hungary	7	6	1	0	85.71%
Israel	3	2	1	0	66.67%
Lithuania	16	6	10	0	37.5%
Luxembourg	4	4	0	0	100%
Malta	7	2	5	0	28.57%
Netherlands	3	0	3	0	0%
Norway	6	6	0	0	100%
Poland	5	0	5	0	0%
Serbia	2	1	1	0	50%
Serbia and Montenegro	1	1	0	0	100%
Sweden	13	4	9	0	30.77%
Switzerland	4	3	1	0	75%
Tunisia	1	0	1	0	0%
Ukraine	3	1	2	0	33.33%
Total	119	58	60	1	48.74%

== Current squad ==
The roster for the 2018–19 Rugby Europe Conference 2 North tournament match against Norway:

- Head coach: (England) Gary Walker

No.	Name	Position	Club
1	Guntis Cirša		RK Miesnieki (Latvia)
2	Ingus Aivars		RK Eži (Latvia)
3	Māris Robežnieks		RK Miesnieki (Latvia)
4	Māris Streikišs		RK Eži (Latvia)
5	Emīls Zerafims		RK Jūrmala (Latvia)
6	Janeks Taškāns		RK Livonia (Latvia)
7	Roberts Miksons		RK Livonia (Latvia)
8	Ainārs Bērziņš		RK Livonia (Latvia)
9	Valters Raņķis		RK Livonia (Latvia)
10	Tomass Davidsons		Wharfedale RUFC (England)
11	Ivo Kapiņš		RK Livonia (Latvia)
12	Viljams Davidsons		Preston Grasshopers (England)
13	Dāvis Bajārs		RK Fēnikss (Latvia)
14	Vigo Valdavs		RK Livonia (Latvia)
15	Roberts Džo Davidsons		Wharfedale RUFC (England)
16	Vladislavs Šagins		Rugby Rovigo Delta (Italy)
17	Arturs Baranovskis		RK Jūrmala (Latvia)
18	Kaspars Briedis		RK Livonia (Latvia)
19	Kristaps Martinsons		RK Livonia (Latvia)
20	Adrians Lovkins		RK Fēnikss (Latvia)
21	Niks Voitečko		RK Livonia (Latvia)
22	Ruslans Kotļevs		RK Eži (Latvia)
23	Kristaps Bērze		RK Sigulda (Latvia)

== Notable players ==
- Uldis Saulīte, 28 Caps, Captain of professional Russian rugby side Yenisey-STM, (2000-present),
- Jurijs Baranovs, plays for professional Russian rugby side Ensiey-STM, (2001-present),
- Roberts Džo Davidsons, top points scorer (20 caps, 209 points),
