= RC Donau =

Austrian rugby union club, based in Vienna

- Full name: Rugby Club Donau
- Union: Austrian Rugby Federation
- Nickname: Piraten
- Founded: 1989; 37 years ago
- Region: Vienna, Austria
- Ground: Donau Rugby Park -Trendsportzentrum - Meiereistraße 20 - 1020 Wien
- President: Ronald Mischek
- Coach: Sebastian Freydell
- League: Erste Österreichische Bundesliga
Team kit

Rugby Union Donau Wien is an Austrian rugby union club in Vienna.

== History ==
In 1999 RC Donau merged with RC Wien, and although both clubs continued to field separate teams until 2002, the merger ultimately resulted in the establishment of Rugby Union Donau Wien as the successor club.

== Honours ==
=== Bundesliga ===
- 1993, 1995, 1996, 1997, 1998, 1999, 2000, 2001, 2002

=== Austro-Moravia Cup ===
- 1997, 1998
