= Rugby union at the 1983 Mediterranean Games =

Rugby at the 1983 Mediterranean Games
- Dates: 7 – 13 July 1983

Rugby union was one of several sports at the 1983 Mediterranean Games. This Mediterranean Games was held in Casablanca, Morocco. Only men's teams participated in the rugby tournament.

== Medalists ==
Event	Gold	Silver	Bronze
Men's Competition	France	Italy	Morocco

== Group matches ==
Team	G	W	D	L	GF	GA	Diff	Points
France	3	3	0	0	61	14	+84	6
Italy	3	2	0	1	16	16	+10	4
Morocco	3	1	0	2	34	43	−9	2
Spain	3	0	0	3	12	97	−85	0

July 7, 1983

Spain	9 – 27	Italy
	Report

Stade du COC, Casablanca
Referee: M. Roulle (France)
July 8, 1983

Morocco	15 – 25	France
	Report

Stade du COC, Casablanca
July 10, 1983

Morocco	9 – 15	Italy
	Report

Stade du COC, Casablanca
Referee: M. Roulle (France)
July 10, 1983

France	60 – 0	Spain

Stade du COC, Casablanca
Referee: Cadamuro (Italy)
July 13, 1983

Morocco	10 – 3	Spain

Stade du COC, Casablanca
Referee: Witting (Romania)
July 13, 1983

France	26 – 12	Italy
	Report

Stade du COC, Casablanca
Referee: Bel Baraka (Morocco)

== Standings ==
Rank	Team
1st place, gold medalist(s)	France
2nd place, silver medalist(s)	Italy
3rd place, bronze medalist(s)	Morocco
4	Spain
