= Rugby union at the 1955 Mediterranean Games =

Rugby at the 1955 Mediterranean Games
- Dates: 18 – 24 July 1955

Rugby union was one of several sports at the 1955 Mediterranean Games. The second Mediterranean Games was held in Barcelona, Spain. Only men's teams participated in the rugby tournament.

== Medalists ==
Event	Gold	Silver	Bronze
Men's Competition	France	Italy	Spain

== Group matches ==
Team	G	W	D	L	GF	GA	Diff	Points
France	2	2	0	0	61	14	+47	4
Italy	2	1	0	1	16	16	0	2
Spain	2	0	0	2	6	53	-47	0

July 18, 1955

Spain	0 – 8	Italy

Estadi Olímpic Lluís Companys, Barcelona
Referee: Ange Siccardi (France)
July 21, 1955

Italy	8 – 16	France

Estadi Olímpic Lluís Companys, Barcelona
Referee: Ricardo Madrid (Spain)
July 24, 1955

France	45 – 6	Spain

Estadi Olímpic Lluís Companys, Barcelona
Referee: Lena (Italy)

== Standings ==
Rank	Team
1st place, gold medalist(s)	France
2nd place, silver medalist(s)	Italy
3rd place, bronze medalist(s)	Spain
