= Rugby Union of Bosnia and Herzegovina =

Sports governing body in Bosnia and Herzegovina

Ragbi Savez Bosne i Hercegovine
- Sport: Rugby union
- Founded: 1992
- World Rugby affiliation: 1996
- RE affiliation: 1992
- President: Semir Mahić
- Men's coach: Ermin Mušinović

The Rugby Union of Bosnia and Herzegovina (Serbo-Croatian: Ragbi Savez Bosne i Hercegovine) is the governing body for rugby in Bosnia and Herzegovina. It oversees the various national teams and domestic competitions.

== History ==
Rugby has been played in Bosnia and Herzegovina since it was a part of Socialist Federal Republic of Yugoslavia. Rugby was administered by the Yugoslav Rugby Federation (YRF), which governed both rugby union and rugby league. The Yugoslavia national rugby league team played a match in the Socialist Republic of Bosnia and Herzegovina in Banja Luka against the France national amateur rugby league team under the YRF's auspices. This lasted until the YRF joined FIRA in 1964 and banned rugby league leaving rugby union as the sole recognised form of rugby in Bosnia and Herzegovina.

In 1992, during the Bosnian war where Bosnia and Herzegovina declared independence, a number of rugby clubs came together and formed the Rugby Union of Bosnia and Herzegovina. They hosted their first match between RC Zenica and the British Army in December 1992. They formally affiliated with the European rugby governing body Fédération Internationale de Rugby Amateur (FIRA) in 1992 and to the International Rugby Football Board (IRFB) in 1996. Despite this membership, the Rugby Union of Bosnia and Herzegovina were often unable to provide necessary rugby equipment. In 1998, Irish Army soldiers as part of the European Union Monitoring Mission in the former Yugoslavia noticed this among the five clubs in Zenica and requested rugby supplies be provided to assist with community integration.

The Rugby Union of Bosnia and Herzegovina was formally admitted as a member of the Olympic Committee of Bosnia and Herzegovina in 2010.

== See also ==
- Rugby union in Bosnia and Herzegovina
- Bosnia and Herzegovina national rugby union team
- Bosnia and Herzegovina national rugby sevens team
- Bosnia and Herzegovina women's national rugby union team
