= RK Fēnikss =

Latvian rugby club

Regbija klubs Fēnikss
- Nickname(s): Fēnikss (Phoenix)
- Founded: January 2005 (as RK Kocēni)
- Location: Valmiera, Latvia
- Ground(s): Jānis Daliņš Stadium (Capacity: 1232)
- President: Kristaps Staņa
- Coach(es): Kristaps Staņa
- Captain(s): Nauris Miglavs
Team kit

RK Fēnikss is a Latvian rugby club based in Valmiera, which also represents the Valmiera Municipality.

== History ==
The club was founded in Valmiera in January 2005 as RK Kocēni, naming it after the adjacent Kocēni Parish, as it aimed to bring together talented youth from the parishes around Valmiera.
