= Stade RC Wien =

Austrian rugby union club, based in Vienna

Stade Rugby Club Wien
- Full name: Stade Rugby Club Wien
- Union: Austrian Rugby Federation
- Nickname: Stade
- Founded: 1989; 37 years ago
- Region: Vienna, Austria
- Ground: Askö Brigittenau
- President: Pascal Gille
- Coach: (Austria) Lukas Dobner (player-coach)
- Captain: (Austria) Lukas Dobner (player-coach)
- League: Erste Österreichische Bundesliga
Team kit

Stade Rugby Club Wien, also referred to as Stade, is an Austrian rugby club from Vienna. Stade is one of the most prestigious rugby clubs in Austria, having been runners-up in the Austrian Championship 2005, 2010 and 2013. Their home ground is the ASKÖ Brigittenau. The club colours are pink and dark blue.
