= RC Graz =

Austrian rugby union club, based in Graz

- Full name: Rugby Club Graz
- Union: Rugby Österreich
- Founded: 1995; 31 years ago
- Location: Graz, Austria
- Ground: Viktor Franz Platz
- President: (England) Anthony Picknell
- Coach: (Austria) Norman Franges
- League: ARC Premiership
| 1st kit | 2nd kit |

RC Graz is an Austrian rugby union club in Graz that plays in the highest domestic division.

The RC Graz Rugby Sevens team are the current Austrian 7s champions, as well as winning from 2013 to 2015 and finishing second in 2016.

== History ==
The club was founded in 1995 following a rise in interest in rugby due to the 1995 Rugby World Cup in South Africa, which was the first rugby world cup to be shown on German-speaking free television. The same year, the club was initiated to the Austrian Rugby Federation (ÖRV) (now Rugby Österreich).

While initially there were struggles to be able to consistently field 15 players, the team was able to compete in the B-Division of the Austrian League. They improved over several years and were crowned champions from 1999/2000 to 2001/02.

While there has been some shifting in the league formats in the subsequent years, the team has mostly played at this level, winning the second division again in 2015 and even at times adequately competing at a higher level.

The team also performed well in the Austrian Challenge Cup, winning three times, and has performed well in the Austrian 7s Championship, winning three times in a row from 2013 to 2015.

In the short Autumn season in 2015, Graz was also the leading team in the ARC Championship Süd. The season was cut short due to a re-organisation of the Austrian league system, and due to this, no winner was crowned.

In 2016, RC Graz ascended into the ARC Premiership once again to compete at the highest level of domestic rugby.

== Women's Rugby ==
The RC Graz women's team plays exclusively Rugby Sevens, and plays in the Women's Bundesliga, the highest level of women's rugby in Austria.

The women's coach is Christian Tratnig.

== Honours ==
1999 Runners-up - B-Division

2000-02 Winners - B-Division

2005-06, 2008 Winners - Austrian Challenge Cup

2012 Runners-up - Nationalliga

2013-14 Runners-up - Nationalliga

2015 Winners - ARC Liga 2

2013-current Winners - Austrian 7s Championship

2013-14 Third place - Women's 7s Bundesliga

2015 Second place - Women's 7s Bundesliga
