= RK Ljubljana =

Slovenian rugby jnion club, based in Ljubljana

(Slovenia) Rugby klub Ljubljana
- Founded: 1962; 64 years ago
- Location: Ljubljana, Slovenia
Team kit

Official website
- rugbyljubljana.si

RK Ljubljana (full name Rugby klub Ljubljana, English: Rugby Club Ljubljana) is a rugby union club in Ljubljana, Slovenia. It participates in the Regional Rugby Championship. The club was founded in 1962.

== Trophies ==
=== Cups ===
- Yugoslav cup (1):
  - 1986

=== European and regional championships ===
- Interleague (Croatia, Slovenia) champions (2):
  - 2002/03, 2004/05
- Regional (BiH, Bulgaria, Croatia, Hungary, Serbia and Slovenia) Rugby champions (1):
  - 2015/16
