= Wombats RC =

Austrian rugby union club, based in Wiener Neustadt

- Full name: Wombats Rugby Club
- Union: Austrian Rugby Federation
- Founded: 2003; 23 years ago
- Location: Wiener Neustadt, Austria
- Ground: Neuklosterwiese
- President: (Australia) Colin McLachlan
- Coach: (Austria) Michael Darr
- Captain: (Austria) Martin Leidl
- League: Zweite Österreichische Bundesliga
Team kit

Wombats RC is an Austrian rugby union club in Wiener Neustadt.

== History ==
The club was founded in 2003 in the nearby town of Bad Fischau-Brunn by current president, Australian Colin McLachlan. A group of players gathered in the Flying Kangaroo pub and set about forming a club.

From 2007 up to 2010, they teamed up with RC Krems and played as the Niederösterreich XV.
