= RK Sisak =

Croatian rugby union club, based in Sisak

- Full name: Ragbi klub Sisak
- Founded: 15 February 1970; 55 years ago (as RK Student)
- Region: Sisak, Croatia
- Ground: Stadion Metalac
- President: (Croatia) Dubravko Pešut
- Coach: (Croatia) Mirsad Žerić
- League: Croatian Rugby Championship
Team kit

RK Sisak is a Croatian rugby club in Sisak.

== History ==
The club was founded on 15 February 1970 as RK Student by a couple of university students.
