= Croatia national rugby union team =

National rugby union team

Croatia
- Union: Croatian Rugby Federation
- Head coach: (New Zealand) Anthony Posa
- Captain: Nik Jurišić
First colours

World Rugby ranking
- Current: 56 (as of 19 June 2026)
- Highest: 39 (2022)
- Lowest: 47 (2023)

Biggest win
- Croatia 78–3 Hungary (22 May 1993)

Biggest defeat
- Croatia 6–126 France A (19 June 1993); Biggest defeat by full international Croatia 3–73 Poland (28 February 2026)

World Cup
- Appearances: 0

The Croatia national rugby union team is governed by the Croatian Rugby Union. Croatia have been playing internationals rugby since 1992, they have yet to qualify for the Rugby World Cup. The national side is ranked 46th in the world (as of 20 March 2023)

== Internationals ==
Croatia played their first international on 28 November 1992, away against Bosnia & Herzegovina, and won 47–3. Croatia played four the following year with wins over Austria and Hungary. They then faced off against Italy, who won 76–11. The year finished off with a win over Morocco 36–12 but a loss to Spain .

The following year they won three of their five fixtures, though they lost to Ukraine and Luxembourg, though the following year, they were able to defeat Luxembourg in 1995. Croatia won a number of games in 1996–97, defeating the likes of Israel, Norway, Bulgaria, Latvia and Moldova and but losing to an experienced Georgia that year by 29–15.

1997 to 2000, Croatia played 11 International for 10 wins and 1 loss (to the Netherlands).

Croatia won five matches in a row from 2001 to 2002. Croatia started in round three of the 2007 Rugby World Cup European qualification tournament but were knocked out by Latvia and Andorra.

On St. Patrick's Day 17 March 2007, in Knin, the Croatian national team played an Irish Barbarians side and won the St. Pat's in Knin Cup.

On 10 November 2007 Croatia defeated Malta 24–9 in Makarska. There are two internationals coming up in 2008 with Croatia taking on Andorra in Split (19 April) and away to Latvia in Riga (10 May)

== Famous players ==
Croatia have a host of players who are New Zealanders, Australians and South Africans of Croatian origin who play the game and have played internationally for these countries. The first New Zealander of Croatian descent to play for Croatia was Brendon Winslow against Luxembourg in 1995.

Other New Zealanders, were Paul Vegar (North Shore, NZ reps), Mario Vodanovich (Te Kauwhata, Counties), Paul Vujcich (Counties, Manurewa and North Shore) and the Graham brothers Rob and Reon (Counties, Patumahoe, Manurewa).

Anthony Posa was another New Zealander who played many times for Croatia (1996–2003), playing out of both the GHA RFC, Glasgow, Scotland and Beverley RUFC, Yorkshire, England. He is now Head Coach of the Yorkshire Under 20 County side which has won numerous English National County Championships and coaches professionally at the Doncaster club in England. His family originated from the Island of Korčula.

Frano Botica was a one time Croatian rugby player and former All Black, whose grandparents were also born in Korčula. Another former All Black who turned out for the Croatian side at the same time was Matthew Cooper. Dan Luger is an England representative whose father Darko Luger is from the island of Brac. Sean Fitzpatrick is another former All Black captain who has Croatian heritage.

== Record ==
=== World Cup ===
World Cup record								World Cup Qualification record					
Year	Round	P	W	D	L	F	A	P	W	D	L	F	A
(Australia) (New Zealand) 1987	Part of Yugoslavia							Part of Yugoslavia					
(United Kingdom) (Ireland) (France) 1991	Part of Yugoslavia							Part of Yugoslavia					
(South Africa) 1995	Did not enter							Did not enter					
(Wales) 1999	Did not qualify							8	6	0	2	297	172
(Australia) 2003	Did not qualify							4	2	0	2	56	70
(France) 2007	Did not qualify							4	1	0	3	76	86
(New Zealand) 2011	Did not qualify							4	3	0	1	74	60
(England) 2015	Did not qualify							4	1	0	3	78	92
(Japan) 2019	Did not qualify							4	2	1	1	106	79
(France) 2023	Did not qualify							Automatically eliminated					
Total	0/9	0	0	0	0	0	0	28	15	1	12	687	559

=== European Competitions ===
Season	Division	G	W	D	L	PF	PA	+/−	Pts	Pos
2000	European Nations Cup Second Division	4	3	0	1	105	36	+29	9	2nd
2000-01	European Nations Cup Second Division	5	2	1	2	70	77	-7	10	4th
2002-04	European Nations Cup Second Division Pool B	8	3	1	4	114	95	+19	15	3rd
2006-08	European Nations Cup Second Division 2B	8	4	0	4	133	134	-1	16	3rd
2008-10	European Nations Cup Second Division 2B	8	6	0	2	161	114	+47	20	2nd
2010-12	European Nations Cup Second Division 2A	8	3	0	5	162	170	-8	19	4th
2012-14	European Nations Cup Second Division 2A	8	2	0	6	145	221	-76	11	4th
2014-16	European Nations Cup Second Division 2A	8	3	0	5	166	217	-51	17	3rd
2016-17	Rugby Europe Conference 1 South	4	2	1	1	106	79	+27	12	3rd
2017-18	Rugby Europe Conference 1 South	4	2	1	1	85	97	-12	11	2nd
2018-19	Rugby Europe Conference 1 South	4	3	1	0	123	69	+54	16	2nd
2019-20	Rugby Europe Conference 1 South	2	2	0	0	64	30	+34	9	1st
2021-22*	Rugby Europe Conference 1 South	2	2	0	0	77	11	+66	10	1st
2022-23	Rugby Europe Trophy	4	1	0	3	100	133	-33	5	5th
2023-24	Rugby Europe Trophy	3	1	0	2	83	75	+8	6	4th

=== Overall ===
Below is a table of the representative rugby matches played by a Croatia national XV at test level up until 17 October 2026, updated after match with Slovenia.

Opponent	Played	Won	Lost	Drawn	% Won
Andorra	7	5	1	1	71.43%
Austria	5	5	0	0	100%
Belgium	5	2	3	0	40%
Bosnia and Herzegovina	5	5	0	0	100%
Bulgaria	2	2	0	0	100%
Cyprus	4	4	0	0	100%
Czech Republic	10	2	8	0	20%
Denmark	6	5	0	1	83.33%
France A	1	0	1	0	0%
Georgia	1	0	1	0	0%
Germany	3	1	1	1	33.33%
Hungary	5	5	0	0	100%
Italy	1	0	1	0	0%
Italy A	1	0	1	0	0%
Israel	8	7	1	0	87.5%
Latvia	8	6	2	0	75%
Lithuania	8	4	4	0	50%
Luxembourg	3	1	1	1	33.33%
Malta	15	8	5	2	53.33%
Mexico	1	0	1	0	0%
Moldova	1	1	0	0	100%
Morocco	1	1	0	0	100%
Netherlands	5	1	4	0	20%
Norway	1	1	0	0	100%
Poland	5	1	4	0	20%
Russia	1	1	0	0	100%
Serbia	1	1	0	0	100%
Serbia and Montenegro	1	1	0	0	100%
Slovenia	12	9	3	0	75%
Spain	2	0	1	1	0%
Sweden	8	1	7	0	12.5%
Switzerland	10	2	8	0	20%
Ukraine	6	2	4	0	33.33%
Total	153	84	62	7	54.9%

== Recent Matches ==
Matches

6 November 2021
14:00 CET (UTC+01)

(1 TBP) Croatia	48–3	Slovenia
	Report

Stari plac, Split
Attendance: 100
Referee: Benjamin Loader (Austria)

13 November 2021
15:00 EET (UTC+02)

Cyprus	8–29	Croatia (1 TBP)
	Report

Stelios Kyriakides Stadium, Paphos
Attendance: 0
Referee: Florin Bonea (Romania)

== Current squad ==
The following players formed the squad for the 2021–22 Rugby Europe Conference 1 South match against Cyprus on 13 November 2021.

- Known Caps updated after match with Cyprus.

Head coach: (New Zealand) Anthony Posa

Note: Flags indicate national union for the club/province as defined by World Rugby.

Player	Position	Date of birth (age)	Caps	Club/province
Ivan Josip Kordun	Prop	19 April 1994 (age 32)		(Croatia) RK Nada
Krešimir Čorić	Hooker	26 August 1993 (age 33)		(Croatia) RK Nada
Luka Perlain	Prop	28 November 1998 (age 27)		(Croatia) RK Nada
Alexander Bibic	Lock	8 August 1998 (age 28)		
Dražen Brčić-Šušak	Lock	28 November 1996 (age 29)		(Croatia) RK Sinj
Ivo Perić	Flanker	2 August 1993 (age 33)		(Croatia) RK Nada
Martin Rešković	Flanker	8 September 1986 (age 40)		(Croatia) RK Zagreb
Marko Buljac	Number 8	28 November 1986 (age 39)		(Croatia) HARK Mladost
Luka Lerotić	Scrum-half	28 November 1990 (age 35)		(Croatia) RK Nada
Nik Jurišić (c)	Fly-half	6 July 1988 (age 38)		(Croatia) HARK Mladost
Jan Vlašić	Wing	29 May 1992 (age 34)		(Croatia) HARK Mladost
Filip Perica	Centre	4 June 1991 (age 35)		(France) RC Sarlat
Marko Grčić	Centre	28 November 1992 (age 33)		(Croatia) RK Sinj
Nikola Pavlović	Wing	18 December 1992 (age 33)		(Croatia) RK Sinj
Domagoj Plazibat	Fullback	31 October 1995 (age 31)		(Croatia) RK Nada
Tomislav Fišić	Back row	29 January 1999 (age 27)		(Croatia) HARK Mladost
Denis Brečić	Prop	28 November 1999 (age 26)		(Croatia) HARK Mladost
Marko Bužančić	Prop	28 November 2000 (age 25)	1	(Croatia) RK Nada
Marin Miloš	Lock	2 May 1999 (age 27)	1	(Croatia) RK Sinj
Željko Galić	Flanker	28 November 1999 (age 26)		(Croatia) RK Zagreb
Dominik Fišić	??	29 January 2000 (age 26)		(Croatia) HARK Mladost
Duje Plazibat	Centre	27 December 1997 (age 28)		(Croatia) RK Nada
Fran Peršić	Wing	12 October 1997 (age 29)		(Croatia) HARK Mladost

== See also ==
- Rugby union in Croatia
