= Rugby Club Partizan =

Serbian rugby union club

(Serbia) Rugby Club Partizan
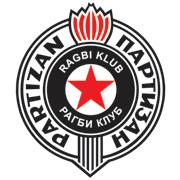
- Full name: Рагби клуб Партизан; Ragbi Klub Partizan Colors
- Founded: 1953
- Location: Belgrade, Serbia
- League: Rugby Championship of Serbia

Rugby Club Partizan (Serbian: Рагби клуб Партизан) is a rugby club from Belgrade, Serbia. The club is part of the sports society JSD Partizan, and is a member of the Rugby Union of Serbia.

== History ==
In its history Partizan has won 21 national Championships and 18 national Cups.

The first rugby clubs in Serbia were formed by some students returning from Britain after the First World War. They founded the "Jugoslavija" club in Belgrade and the "Beli orao" club in Sabac, but by 1923 rugby activities had ceased due to a lack of pitches.

Rugby was re-introduced in 1953 when Dragan Marsicevic, the secretary of the Yugoslavian Sport Association, accepted an offer from the French Rugby Federation to send two teams to Serbia to play a series of four matches to stimulate interest. The first match between the French Universities team and a French Provincial Selection was played in Belgrade on 26 November 1953.

Partizan was the first new rugby club in Yugoslavia, founded on November 1, 1953. A few months later rugby club Radnicki was founded too. The first match between Partizan and Radnicki was played in Paracin on 26 April 1954, with Partizan winning 21–11. The return match played in Belgrade on 1 May 1954 was also won by Partizan, 16–14.

The Rugby Championship of Yugoslavia ran from 1957–1991. Partizan won the second, third, and fourth title. Before the breakup of SFR Yugoslavia, Partizan won titles in 1988 and in 1991, the last championship.

== Current squad ==
Senior Squad:

Player	Position
Ivan Ničić	Prop
Aleksandar Ljubičic	Prop
Miloš Joksimović	Prop
Đorđe Preradojević	Lock
Aleksandar Krstić	Lock
Vukasin Medić	Flanker
Nikola Nenadović	Number 8
Borislav Radić	Scrum-half
Petar Pericic	Scrum-half
Miloš Ljubičić	Fly-half
Nenad Matejić	Fly-half
Aleksandar Bajić	Center
Zoran Radeka	Wing
Igor Dejanović	Fullback
Sasa Đukić	Wing
Vladimir Dejanović	Wing

== Honours ==
- Rugby Championship of Yugoslavia
  - Winners (6) 1959, 1960, 1961, 1988, 1991, 1992
- Rugby Championship of SR Yugoslavia/Serbia_and_Montenegro
  - Winners (11) 1993, 1994, 1996, 1997, 1998, 1999, 2002, 2003, 2004, 2005, 2006
- Rugby Championship of Serbia
  - Winners (4) 2018, 2019, 2020, 2021
- Rugby 7
  - Winners (8) 1997, 1998, 2002, 2003, 2013, 2018, 2021, 2025
- Rugby 10
  - Winners (1) 2016
- Rugby Cup of Yugoslavia
  - Winners (2) 1960, 1992
- Rugby Cup of SR Yugoslavia/Serbia_and_Montenegro/Serbia
  - Winners (15) 1993, 1994, 1995, 1996, 1997, 1998, 1999, 2000, 2003, 2005, 2008, 2011, 2015, 2019, 2021
