= Rugby Championship of Yugoslavia =

Historical Yugoslavian Sporting Event

The Rugby Championship of Yugoslavia was the highest level competition of the Rugby union in Yugoslavia. The league lasted until 1991, when several successor leagues were formed.

== Results ==
Year	Federal Republic	Club	Title
1957	(Socialist Republic of Serbia) Serbia	Jedinstvo Pančevo	1
1958	(Socialist Republic of Croatia) Croatia	Mladost Zagreb	1
1959	(Socialist Republic of Serbia) Serbia	Partizan Beograd	1
1960	(Socialist Republic of Serbia) Serbia	Partizan Beograd	2
1961	(Socialist Republic of Serbia) Serbia	Partizan Beograd	3
1962	(Socialist Republic of Croatia) Croatia	Nada Split	1
1963	(Socialist Republic of Croatia) Croatia	Nada Split	2
1964	(Socialist Republic of Croatia) Croatia	Nada Split	3
1965	(Socialist Republic of Croatia) Croatia	Nada Split	4
1966	(Socialist Republic of Croatia) Croatia	Nada Split	5
1967	(Socialist Republic of Croatia) Croatia	Nada Split	6
1968	(Socialist Republic of Serbia) Serbia	Dinamo Pančevo	1
1969	(Socialist Republic of Serbia) Serbia	Dinamo Pančevo	2
1970	(Socialist Republic of Croatia) Croatia	Nada Split	7
1971	(Socialist Republic of Croatia) Croatia	Nada Split	8
1972	(Socialist Republic of Croatia) Croatia	Nada Split	9
1973	(Socialist Republic of Croatia) Croatia	Nada Split	10
1974	(Socialist Republic of Serbia) Serbia	Dinamo Pančevo	3
1975	(Socialist Republic of Croatia) Croatia	Zagreb	1
1976	(Socialist Republic of Croatia) Croatia	Zagreb	2
1977	(Socialist Republic of Croatia) Croatia	Zagreb	3
1978	(Socialist Republic of Croatia) Croatia	Zagreb	4
1979	(Socialist Republic of Serbia) Serbia	Dinamo Pančevo	4
1980	(Socialist Republic of Croatia) Croatia	Zagreb	5
1981	(Socialist Republic of Croatia) Croatia	Zagreb	6
1982	(Socialist Republic of Bosnia and Herzegovina) Bosnia and Herzegovina	Čelik Zenica	1
1983	(Socialist Republic of Bosnia and Herzegovina) Bosnia and Herzegovina	Čelik Zenica	2
1984	(Socialist Republic of Bosnia and Herzegovina) Bosnia and Herzegovina	Čelik Zenica	3
1985	(Socialist Republic of Bosnia and Herzegovina) Bosnia and Herzegovina	Čelik Zenica	4
1986	(Socialist Republic of Bosnia and Herzegovina) Bosnia and Herzegovina	Čelik Zenica	5
1987	(Socialist Republic of Bosnia and Herzegovina) Bosnia and Herzegovina	Čelik Zenica	6
1988	(Socialist Republic of Serbia) Serbia	Partizan Beograd	4
1989	(Socialist Republic of Croatia) Croatia	Nada Split	11
1990	(Socialist Republic of Bosnia and Herzegovina) Bosnia and Herzegovina	Čelik Zenica	7
1991	(Socialist Republic of Serbia) Serbia	Partizan Beograd	5

== Wins by club ==
- RK Nada Split (11 championships)
- RK Čelik Zenica (7 championships)
- RK Zagreb (6 championships)
- RK Partizan Belgrade (5 championships)
- RK Dinamo Pančevo (4 championships)
- Mladost Zagreb (1 championship)
- RK Jedinstvo Pančevo (1 championship)
