= Vienna Celtic RFC =

(Austria) Vienna Celtic Rugby Football Club (VCRFC)
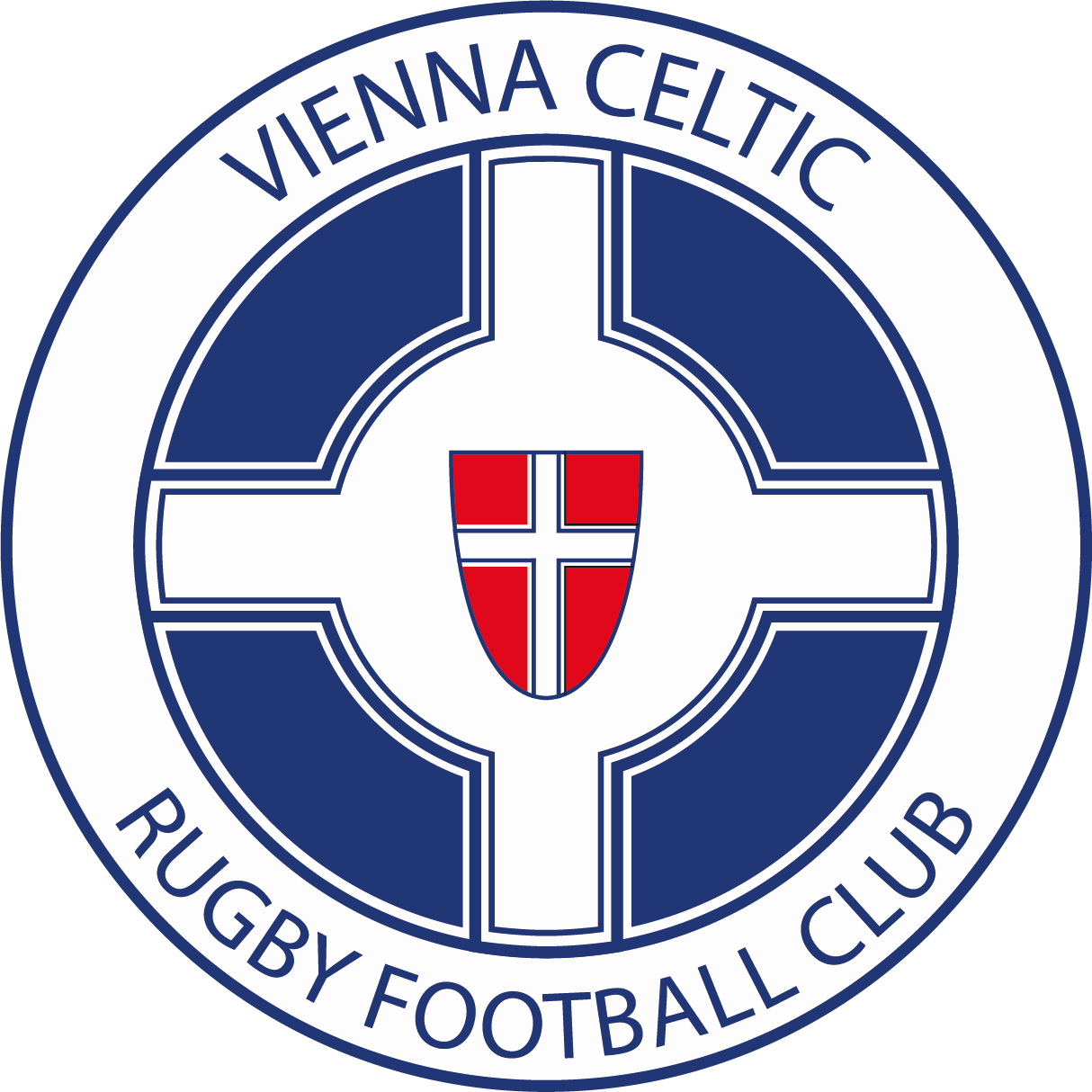
- Full name: Vienna Celtic Rugby Football Club
- Union: Austrian Rugby Federation
- Nickname(s): Celtic, Celts
- Founded: 1978
- Region: Vienna, Austria
- Ground(s): Austrian Rugby Centre 1230 Vienna, Steinergasse 12
- Chairman: Antonio de Vall
- Captain(s): Johannes Fiebrich
- League(s): Austrian 15's Premiership Austrian 7s Competition Austrian 10s Competition (Geppert Cup) National Champion 1993, 2019, 2023

Vienna Celtic Rugby Football Club, also known as Vienna Celtic RFC and VCRFC, is Austria's oldest Austrian rugby club, located in Vienna's district of Liesing. The club currently holds the championship in Austria's top men's division (ARC Premiership, season 2022–23). Vienna Celtic RFC has a long-standing tradition of training youth players (boys and girls).

== History ==
Founded on January 19, 1978, by a group of Rugby players from Great Britain and Austria, Vienna Celtic RFC is the oldest Rugby club in Austria. The "Celts" successfully competed their first game in 1978 against a combined team of players from the British and Australian embassies, the International Atomic Energy Agency IAEA, the American International School and U.N. staff.

Despite the prevailing political situation in the late 1970s, the club managed to find opponents from neighbouring countries and played successfully against Czechoslovak and Hungarian teams, i.e. Gottwaldov or Kecskemet.

Although facing insufficient infrastructural support from the local administration, the club managed to grow steadily and to establish itself as a driving force in the slowly growing Austrian Rugby landscape. The first Austrian Rugby championship, held in the season 1992/93, was won by Vienna Celtic. After long years of wandering around the city, in 2015 the club finally managed to find a new home in the Atzgersdorf Federal Sports Center.

A major concern of the club is the promotion of Women's Rugby. Thus, on October 4, 2020 - after more than 10 years without female representation of Vienna Celtic RFC's own women's team - the “Blue Ladies” wrote club history and played at a tournament again and won their first game.

== General ==
The name "Vienna Celtic" refers to the common roots of the club's founders who came from Scotland, Wales, Ireland and the former Noricum (the Celtic kingdom in the area of today's Austria). Additionally, the name incorporates the very appropriate meaning of the name, "Celts": Keltoi = the brave (pronounced "Keltic").

Based in Vienna's 23rd district, Steinergasse 12, the club's facilities today include an own clubhouse, a natural turf as well as an artificial turf pitch suitable for contact sports.

Vienna Celtic RFC consists of two men's teams (“First XV” and “Wanderers”), one women's team (“Blue Ladies”), the Touch Rugby Team (“Touch Brigade”), a veterans team ("Celtic Old Boys") and a total of eight youth teams for kids from 5 to 18 years, both boys and girls.

Additionally, the club offers the opportunity to take part in the weekly Social Touch Rugby game, played without physical contact, for everyone who is interested.

== International and Social Aspects ==
Besides the athletic development of its teams, Vienna Celtic puts strong emphasis on national as well as international relationships. Until today, Vienna Celtic is considered the most international Rugby club in Austria, with active members from more than 20 countries. Therefore, the social aspect represents a special good for the members of the club. Social gatherings on and off the pitch constitute important elements of VCRFC's club life.

Its international activities resulted in several long lasting friendships with clubs abroad. There are long-lived traditions such as:

- "Capitals Cup": an annual tournament between the international teams (expats teams) from: Budapest, Prague, Warsaw, Moscow, Vienna, as well as the
- "Caledonian Cup": every game against München RFC is played for the Caledonian Cup. The winning team holds the trophy until the next match.

Also, international tours have been an integral part of almost every season up to now (i.a. Wales: 1984, 2015; Scotland: 1986, 1993, 2013; Ireland: 1990, 2008, 2018, South Africa: 1995; Zimbabwe: 1997).

== Future ==
The future concept of the Vienna Celtic RFC includes the following 4 key points:

1. The further expansion of the mini- and junior department, with the clear goal of becoming the major Rugby training club in Austria.
2. The further development of the women's team in order to contest for titles on a regular basis.
3. Consolidation of the men's "First XV" (1st team) as top contender for the Austrian championship as well as ambassador for Austrian Rugby on the international stage.
4. The further expansion of the club's grounds together with the Austrian Rugby association in Atzgersdorf.
