= Rugby union in Austria =

- Country: Austria
- Governing body: Rugby Österreich
- National team: Austria
- First played: 1900
- Registered players: 1,345
- Clubs: 18

National competitions
- Rugby World Cup; Rugby World Cup Sevens; IRB Sevens World Series; European Nations Cup

Rugby union in Austria is a minor but growing sport. The national men's team is currently ranked 72nd in the World Rugby's world rankings, the women's national team is ranked 38rd.

== Governing body ==
The governing body for Austria is Rugby Österreich, which was founded in 1990, and affiliated to the IRB in 1992.

== History ==
Like neighbouring Germany, Austrian rugby has a surprisingly long history, dating back to 1900 , but the game's English image meant that its development was hindered by the events of the early 20th Century, particularly the two world wars, and the rise of two major far right movements.

The first documented game of rugby played in Austria took place on 14 April 1912. The sport was being brought to Austria by two Englishmen hoping to expand the sports base. It was over sixty years, however, before rugby union took hold in Austria.

Nonetheless, a 1930 game between two French sides in Vienna drew no less than 10,000 spectators, proving that there was a significant interest at the time.

The post-war period has seen a revival in Austrian rugby, partly due to the large number of foreign military personnel who came to be based there. In 1946, matches were being played by the BTA (British Troops Austria) XV at Vienna and elsewhere. One of their "home" matches in Vienna was against a British combined services Central Mediterranean Forces XV, which featured not only the future television rugby commentator and Hawick RFC player Bill McLaren, but also a Colonel Stan Adkins, who would later play for Coventry RFC and England.

The London Irish player Spike Hughes wrote about the surreal world of 1960s Austrian rugby in the foreword to Michael Green's The Art of Coarse Rugby:

"I can claim the rare distinction of having played in a Coarse Rugby international... [Late] one night in the bar of a Viennese night club called the Moulin Rouge... I was sitting there, quietly minding my own business when a young Englishman from our own Legation pleaded with me to play rugby the following afternoon. They were playing the Rumanians, he explained. Who were 'They'? I asked. Austria, I was told... I wasn't being 'selected', I was being invited, if not actually begged to play. A group of South African medical students and one or two members of the British Legation had committed themselves (I have never discovered why) to play the Rumanians three times in three days..."

Because the journey from Bucharest to Vienna took so long, it hadn't been thought worthwhile to play just one match, and as Hughes admits, many of the Austrians had had to be taken off in the previous two matches. However, the game managed to attract some interest:

"by some kind of bush telegraph the result—Rumania 15 points, Austria 9 points—appeared under the heading of 'Ruggby Fussball' in the sports pages of the following morning's papers which I read in bed, where I stayed, crippled by stiffness for the next week."

The ÖRV was founded in 1990 and joined the International Rugby Board in 1992.

The main international rivalry is with the neighbouring countries of Germany and Hungary. In 1992, Austria played a FIRA match with Hungary in front of 8,000 spectators.

In the early 1990s, former Italian cap, Dr Giancarlo Tizanini was a major driving force. Before his death in 1994, he tried hard to establish a Central European equivalent of the Six Nations between Austria, Hungary, Croatia, Slovenia and Bosnia.

Rugby union in Austria has begun to grow in recent years as they appeared in the 2008 European Nations Cup.

Austria currently runs the Alpe Adria Rugby Competition, a development league with teams from Austria, Slovakia, Slovenia and Croatia. The Austrian National Championship is played as a cup and plate competition. Besides that a team from Rugby Union Donau play in the Czech first division (Extraliga), and teams from Rugby Union Donau and Vienna Celtic Rugby Football Club play in the Hungarian First Division (Ekstraliga).

Teams from the Austrian clubs Rugby Club Innsbruck and Rugby Club Vorarlberg compete in the neighbouring Bavarian league.

== See also ==
- Austria national rugby union team
- Austria women's national rugby union team
- Alpe Adria Rugby Competition
