= Austria national rugby union team =

National rugby union team

Austria
- Nickname: Steinböcke
- Union: Austrian Rugby Federation
- Head coach: Kurt Martin
- Captain: Robert Schneider
First colours	Second colours

World Rugby ranking
- Current: 63 (as of 1 June 2026)
- Highest: 61 (11 May 2026)
- Lowest: 93 (7 October 2013)

First international
- Hungary 23–9 Austria (Esztergom, Hungary; 3 May 1992)

Biggest win
- Austria 117–3 Slovakia (Vienna, Austria; 3 May 2025)

Biggest defeat
- Austria 0–78 Ukraine (Vienna, Austria; 14 May 1994)

The Austria national rugby union team is a third tier rugby union playing nation. They began playing international rugby in the early 1990s. Thus far, Austria has not made an appearance at any of the World Cups.

The national side is ranked 63rd in the world, as of 1 June 2026. The team reached their highest ever ranking of 61st on the 11th of May 2026.

== History ==
Austria played their first official international on 3 May 1992 against Hungary, losing 23 points to nine. Austria had another fixture against Hungary that year, it was the first home game, which they lost 5:3, as well as two games against Slovenia. Austria's first win came against Slovenia on 21 November 1992, winning 9:5. Austria played nations such as Croatia and Ukraine as well as regulars Slovenia.

From 1996 on Austria began winning more games, and only lost a few sporadic matches in the late 1990s, as they were now beating the European sides that had beaten them in the early 1990s. During the 2000s Austria were now playing a larger variety of nations. After not winning one game in 2002, Austria went on to win every fixture in 2004, creating an undefeated streak which was broken by Denmark in 2005.

== Current squad ==
Squad for opening 2023-24 Rugby Europe Conference match against Hungary.

- Caps & age not updated.
- Head coach: Kurt Martin

Note: Flags indicate national union for the club/province as defined by World Rugby.

Player	Position	Date of birth (age)	Caps	Club/province
Adi Prapsilo	Prop	{{{age}}}	{{{caps}}}	(Austria) RC Donau
Moritz Schwab	Hooker	{{{age}}}	{{{caps}}}	(Austria) RC Donau
Omar El Agrebi	Prop	{{{age}}}	{{{caps}}}	(Austria) Vienna Celtic RFC
Alexander Bercovici	Lock	{{{age}}}	{{{caps}}}	
Max Schwab	Lock	{{{age}}}	{{{caps}}}	(Austria) RC Donau
Georg Leutgöb	Flanker	{{{age}}}	{{{caps}}}	(Austria) RC Linz
Julian Tröndle	Flanker	{{{age}}}	{{{caps}}}	(Austria) RC Graz
Robert Schneider	Number 8	{{{age}}}	{{{caps}}}	(Austria) RC Donau
Fabian Wolfram	Scrum-half	{{{age}}}	{{{caps}}}	(Austria) RC Donau
Peter Morris	Fly-half	{{{age}}}	{{{caps}}}	
Julian Terler	Wing	{{{age}}}	{{{caps}}}	(Austria) RC Donau
Alexander Ganzberger	Centre	{{{age}}}	{{{caps}}}	(Austria) RC Linz
Benjamin Preclik	Centre	{{{age}}}	{{{caps}}}	
Tobias Böhm	Wing	{{{age}}}	{{{caps}}}	
Max Karpeles	Fullback	{{{age}}}	{{{caps}}}	
Paul Hruschka	Prop	{{{age}}}	{{{caps}}}	
Stefan Pauser	??	{{{age}}}	{{{caps}}}	(Austria) Wombats RC
Vincent Ritzberger	Lock	{{{age}}}	{{{caps}}}	(Austria) RC Donau
Alexander Radomirov	??	{{{age}}}	{{{caps}}}	
Fabian Unterlercher	??	{{{age}}}	{{{caps}}}	
Michael Hehenberger	??	{{{age}}}	{{{caps}}}	
Samuel Schönauer	Scrum-half	{{{age}}}	{{{caps}}}	(Austria) RC Donau
Clemens Mostbeck	??	{{{age}}}	{{{caps}}}	(Austria) Vienna Celtic RFC

== Record ==
Below is a table of the representative rugby matches played by an Austria national XV at test level up until 10 October 2026, updated after match with Croatia.

Against	Played	Won	Lost	Drawn	Win percentage
Andorra	2	0	2	0	0%
Bosnia and Herzegovina	8	8	0	0	100%
Bulgaria	5	3	2	0	60%
Croatia	5	0	5	0	0%
Cyprus	3	0	3	0	0%
Czech Republic	1	0	1	0	0%
Denmark	9	3	6	0	33.33%
Finland	1	0	1	0	0%
Germany	1	0	1	0	0%
Hungary	17	7	10	0	41.18%
Israel	4	1	3	0	25%
Latvia	3	0	3	0	0%
Lithuania	4	1	3	0	25%
Luxembourg	7	2	5	0	28.57%
Malta	2	0	2	0	0%
Moldova	3	1	2	0	33.33%
Monaco	1	1	0	0	100%
Norway	9	3	5	1	44.44%
Serbia	5	2	3	0	40%
Slovakia	3	3	0	0	100%
Slovenia	25	13	12	0	52%
Sweden	2	0	2	0	0%
Switzerland	3	0	3	0	0%
Turkey	1	1	0	0	100%
Ukraine	2	0	2	0	0%
Yugoslavia	1	0	1	0	0%
Total	128	50	77	1	39.06%

== Coaches ==
Name	Years
Didier Louvat	2004-2007
Gael Mouysset	2007–'2013
David Holby	
Kurt Martin	2021 -
