= RK Nada Split =

Croatian rugby union club, based in Split

(Croatia) Rugby klub Nada
- Founded: February 23, 1959; 67 years ago
- Location: Split, Croatia
- Ground: Stadion Stari plac
- Coach: Denis Puljiz
- Captain: Mate Borozan
- League: Prvenstvo Hrvatske u ragbiju
- 2010-11: 1st
1st kit	2nd kit

Official website
- www.nada-rugby.hr

RK Nada (full name Ragbi klub Nada, English: Rugby Club Nada) is a rugby union club from Split, Croatia. It participates in the Croatian Rugby Championship, the Croatian Rugby Cup and the Regional Rugby Championship. The club was founded on February 23, 1959.

Club seat is on the address Zrinsko-Frankopanska 17, Split.

The club was the most successful in the Rugby Championship of Yugoslavia, with eleven championships, as well as in modern Croatian competitions.

== Trophies ==
Trophee International Du Fair-Play Pierre De Coubertin 1987

=== Championships ===
- Croatian champions (26):
  - 1981^{1}, 1991/92, 1992/93, 1994/95, 1995/96, 1996/97, 1998/99, 1999/00, 2002/03, 2003/04, 2004/05, 2005/06, 2006/07, 2007/08, 2008/09, 2009/10, 2010/2011, 2011/2012, 2012/13, 2013/14, 2014/15, 2015/16, 2016/17, 2017/18, 2018/19, 2020/21

^{1} The only such championship held during Yugoslavia.

- Yugoslav champions (11):
  - 1962, 1963, 1964, 1965, 1966, 1967, 1970, 1971, 1972, 1973, 1989.
- Croatian champions Rugby 7 (5):
  - 2007, 2008, 2009, 2010, 2011

=== Cups ===
- Croatian cup (15):
  - 1993, 1998, 1999, 2000, 2004, 2005, 2007, 2008, 2009, 2010, 2011, 2012, 2013, 2014, 2016
- Yugoslav cup (9):
  - 1964, 1968, 1969, 1970, 1972, 1976, 1982, 1984, 1989

=== European and regional championships ===
- Central European Champions' Cup (1):
  - 2001: champions (victory over Czech team Dragon Brno)
- Interleague (Croatia, Slovenia) champions (3):
  - 2003/04, 2006/07, 2007/08
- Regional (BiH, Bulgaria, Croatia, Hungary, Serbia and Slovenia) Rugby champions (9):
  - 2007/08, 2008/09, 2009/10, 2010/2011, 2011/12, 2012/13, 2013/14, 2016/17, 2017/18
- European Champions' Cup for amateur teams:
  - 2005: third
  - 2006: second (lost in finals to Russian team Slava Zenit)

=== Youth Trophies ===
==== National champions ====
- U-19
  - 1969, 1984, 1985, 1989, 1992, 1993, 1994, 1995, 1996, 1998, 2000, 2001, 2002, 2003, 2004, 2005, 2006, 2008, 2010
- U-17
  - 1994, 1995, 1996, 1997, 1998, 1999, 2008, 2009, 2010
- U-16
  - 1982, 1983, 1987, 1993, 1994, 1995, 1996, 1997, 1998, 2000, 2001, 2003, 2004, 2005, 2006, 2008
- U-14
  - 1995, 1996, 2001, 2004, 2005, 2006, 2007, 2008
- U-12
  - 1995, 1996, 2001, 2005

==== Cup winners ====
- U-19
  - 1983, 1984, 1985, 1991, 1992, 1993, 1994, 1995, 1996, 1997, 1999, 2000, 2001, 2002, 2003, 2004, 2005, 2008, 2009, 2010
- U-17
  - 1996, 1997, 1998, 1999, 2000, 2008, 2009, 2010
- U-16
  - 1993, 1994, 1995, 1996, 1997, 1998, 1999, 2000, 2001, 2002, 2003, 2004, 2008
