= RK Zagreb (rugby union) =

Croatian rugby union club, based in Zagreb

(Croatia) Rugby klub Zagreb
- Founded: February 16, 1964; 61 years ago
- Location: Zagreb, Croatia
- Ground: Rudeš
- League: Prvenstvo Hrvatske u ragbiju
Team kit

Official website
- www.zagreb-rugby.hr

RK Zagreb (full name Ragbi klub Zagreb, English: Rugby Club Zagreb) is a rugby union club from Zagreb, Croatia. It participates in the Croatian Rugby Championship, the Croatian Rugby Cup and the Interleague. The club was founded on February 16, 1964.

Club offices are situated at Kranjčevićeva 4, Zagreb.

The club won the Rugby Championship of Yugoslavia six times, and won the Croatian rugby championship twice.

== Trophies ==
=== Championships ===
- Croatian:

- winners 2: 1993/94, 2000/01

- Yugoslav:

- winners 6: 1974/75, 1975/76, 1976/77, 1977/78, 1979/80, 1980/81

=== Cups ===
- Croatian cup:

- winners 3: 1996, 2002, 2003

- Yugoslav cup:

- winners 2: 1974, 1980

- Interleague:

- champions 1: 2005/06
