= Rugby Union of Serbia =

Governing body for rugby union in Serbia

Ragbi Savez Srbije
- Sport: Rugby union
- Founded: 1954; 72 years ago
- World Rugby affiliation: 1988
- RE affiliation: 1964
- President: Uroš Babić
- Men's coach: Michel Milovic
- Women's coach: Milan Orlović
- Website: www.rugbyserbia.com

The Rugby Union of Serbia (Serbian: Ragbi Savez Srbije) is the governing body for rugby union in Serbia. It was founded in 1954 and joined Rugby Europe (formerly FIRA-AER) in 1964. It has been a member of World Rugby (formerly the IRB) since 1988.

== Leadership ==
Rugby Union of Serbia

- President of the Alliance: Marko Jovanović
- President of the Assembly: Goran Vuković
- General Secretary: Miroljub Bukvić
- Competition and Registration Commissioner: Dejan Deljak
- National Development Coach: Marko Žeravica

Managing Board

- President: Marko Jovanović, Belgrade
- General Secretary: Miroljub Bukvić, Belgrade
- Member: Miomir Kalabić, Pančevo
- Member: Dragan Sekulović, Starčevo
- Member: Srdjan Nikolić, Belgrade

Supervisory Board

- President: Goran Višnjić
- Member: Miro Arsenijević
- Member: Miomir Kalabić

Competition Commission

- President: Goran Višnjić
- Member: Branislav Vila
- Member: Viktor Džanković

Other League Officials

- Disciplinary Judge: Dipl. Right. Sonja Inđić
- President of the Judicial Organization: Dejan Štiglić
- Chairman of the Delegation: Goran Vuković
- President of the Organization of Health Workers in Rugby: Srđan Nikolić

National Team of Serbia

- Manager: Goran Vuković
- Selector: Mišel Milović
- Fitness and backline coach: Marko Žeravica
- Backline coach: Marko Janković
- Scrum coach: Ljubomir Bukvić

== Teams ==
- Serbia - the national men's rugby union team.
- 7s - the national men's rugby union seven-a-side team.
- Serbia - the national women's rugby union team.
- 7s - the national women's rugby union seven-a-side team.

== See also ==
- Rugby union in Serbia
- Serbia national rugby union team
