= Rugby Europe Women's Sevens =

Series of regional championships

- Current season, competition or edition: 2026 Rugby Europe Women's Sevens Championship Series
- Sport: Rugby sevens
- Founded: 2003; 23 years ago
- Countries: 12 (in 2023)
- Most recent champion: Poland (2nd title)
- Most titles: Russia (7 titles)

The Rugby Europe Women's Sevens, previously the FIRA–AER Women's Sevens until 2013, is a series of regional championships for women's international rugby sevens in Europe. Prior to 2012, the annual tournament is held over two days, typically on a weekend in June, before the highest category tournament was reorganized as the Sevens Grand Prix Series, modeled after the format of the World Rugby Sevens Series. The tournaments are sanctioned and sponsored by Rugby Europe.

== History ==
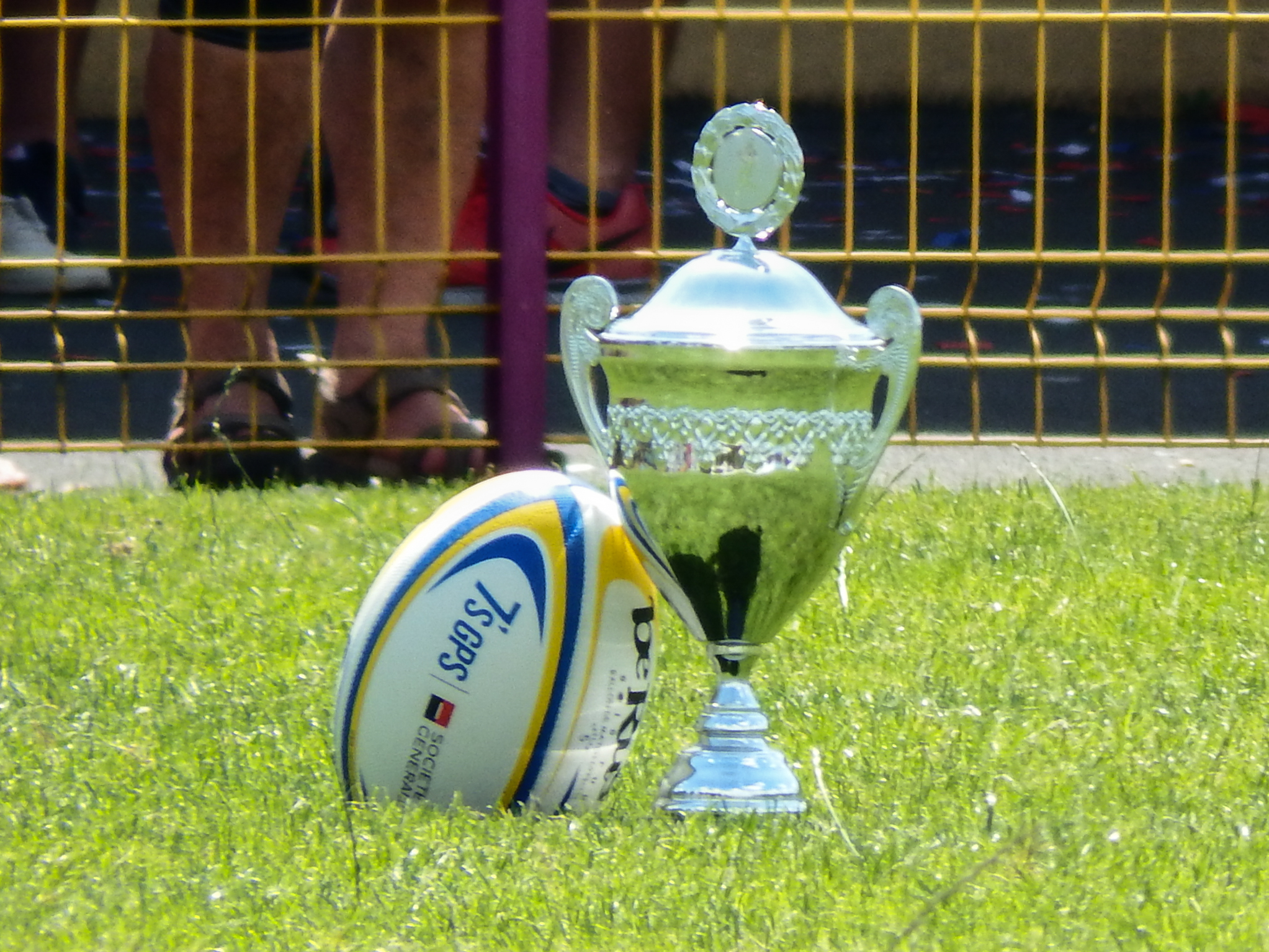
The championship Trophy beside the ball of the 2015 edition.

Rugby sevens — also known as 7-a-side, or 7s — is a short form of the sport of rugby union that was first played in 1883. The first (men's) internationals took place in 1973. As women's rugby union developed in the 1960s and 1970s the format became very popular as it allowed games, and entire leagues, to be developed in countries even when player numbers were small, and it remains the main form the women's game is played in most parts of the world.

However, although the first women's international rugby union 15-a-side test match took place in 1982, it was not until 1997 before the first women's international 7s tournaments were played, when the 1997 Hong Kong Sevens included a women's tournament for the first time. Over the next decade the number of tournaments grew, with almost every region developing regular championship competitions. This reached its zenith with 2009's inaugural women's tournament for the Rugby World Cup Sevens, shortly followed by the announcement that women's rugby sevens will be included in the Olympics from 2016.

The first official regional 7s championship for international women's teams from European was the European Women's Sevens Championship held in 2003 in Lunel, France. Since then, the regional 7s championships have periodically served as pre-qualifying competitions for the Rugby 7s World Cup, or other sevens tournaments.

== Tournaments ==
The following are details of all regional women's international championships played in Europe, listed chronologically with the earliest first, with all result details, where known (included are the FIRA–AER Women's Sevens and other official regional championships, e.g. the Europe Emerging Nations tournaments).

=== Championship Series ===
Rugby Europe Women's Sevens
| Year | Place | Champions | Runners-up | Third |
|---|---|---|---|---|
FIRA-AER Women's Sevens
| 2003 | (France) Lunel | Spain | France | Switzerland |
| 2004 | (France) Limoges | England | Italy | France |
| 2005 | (France) Lunel | England | Spain | Netherlands |
| 2006 | (France) Limoges | Wales | England | Netherlands |
| 2007 | (France) Lunel | France | England | Spain |
| 2008 | (France) Limoges | England | Netherlands | Russia |
| 2009 | (Germany) Hanover | England | Spain | Netherlands |
| 2010 | (Russia) Moscow | Spain | Netherlands | France |
| 2011 | (Romania) Bucharest | England | Spain | Netherlands |
Grand Prix Series
| 2012 | Multiple | England | Spain | France |
| 2013 | Multiple | Russia | England | France |
| 2014 | Multiple | Russia | France | England |
| 2015 (I) | Multiple | France | Russia | Spain |
| 2015 (II) | (Portugal) Lisbon | Spain | Ireland | Portugal |
| 2016 | Multiple | Russia | France | Ireland |
| 2017 | Multiple | Russia | Ireland | France |
| 2018 | Multiple | Russia | France | Ireland |
| 2019 (I) | Multiple | Russia | France | Ireland |
| 2019 (II) | (Russia) Kazan | England | Russia | France |
| 2020 | Series not played because of COVID-19 pandemic. | | | |
Championship Series
| 2021 | Multiple | Russia | Poland | Spain |
| 2022 | Multiple | Poland | Ireland | Scotland |
| 2023 | Multiple | France | Spain | Great Britain |
| 2024 | Multiple | France | Belgium | Spain |
| 2025 | Multiple | Great Britain | Poland | France |
| 2026 | Multiple | Poland | France | Ireland |

Team records for Championship Series

| Team | Champions | Runners-up | Third |
|---|---|---|---|
| Russia | 7 (2013, 2014, 2016, 2017, 2018, 2019, 2021) | 1 (2015) | 1 (2008) |
| England | 6 (2004, 2005, 2008, 2009, 2011, 2012) | 3 (2006, 2007, 2013) | 1 (2014) |
| France | 4 (2007, 2015, 2023, 2024) | 6 (2003, 2014, 2016, 2018, 2019, 2026) | 6 (2004, 2010, 2012, 2013, 2017, 2025) |
| Spain | 2 (2003, 2010) | 5 (2005, 2009, 2011, 2012, 2023) | 4 (2007, 2015, 2021, 2024) |
| Poland | 2 (2022, 2026) | 2 (2021, 2025) | – |
| Great Britain | 1 (2025) | – | 1 (2023) |
| Wales | 1 (2006) | – | – |
| Netherlands | – | 2 (2008, 2010) | 4 (2005, 2006, 2009, 2011) |
| Ireland | – | 2 (2017, 2022) | 4 (2016, 2018, 2019, 2026) |
| Italy | – | 1 (2004) | – |
| Belgium | – | 1 (2024) | – |
| Switzerland | – | – | 1 (2003) |
| Scotland | – | – | 1 (2022) |

=== Trophy ===
| Year | Host | Champions | Runners-up | Third |
|---|---|---|---|---|
| 2005 | (Czech Republic) Prague | Russia | Germany | Lithuania |
| 2006 | (France) Limoges | Romania | Andorra | Poland |
| 2007 | (Croatia) Zagreb | France U20 | Switzerland | Germany |
| 2008 | Multiple | Romania | Finland | Israel |
| 2008 | Multiple | Germany | Moldova | Andorra |
| 2009 | (Belgium) Bruges | Finland | Czech Republic | Malta |
| 2010 | (Romania) Bucharest | Moldova | Switzerland | Belgium |
| 2011 | (Latvia) Riga | Ukraine | Switzerland | Czech Republic |
| 2012 | Multiple | Wales | Croatia | Romania |
| 2012 | Multiple | Ireland | Scotland | Belgium |
| 2013 | (Czech Republic) Prague | Belgium | Sweden | Czech Republic |
| 2014 | (Norway) Bergen | Ukraine | Scotland | Romania |
| 2015 | (Lithuania) Kaunas | Belgium | Finland | Sweden |
| 2016 | Multiple | Sweden | Poland | Scotland |
| 2017 | Multiple | Scotland | Germany | Ukraine |
| 2018 | Multiple | Netherlands | Ukraine | Sweden |
| 2019 | Multiple | Germany | Romania | Czech Republic |
| 2020 | Series not played because of COVID-19 pandemic. | | | |
| 2021 | (Croatia) Zagreb | Ukraine | Czech Republic | Sweden |
| 2022 | Multiple | England | Italy | Portugal |
| 2023 | Multiple | Ukraine | Turkey | Finland |
| 2024 | Multiple | Sweden | Georgia | Denmark |

=== Conference ===
| Year | Host | Champions | Runners-up | Third |
|---|---|---|---|---|
| 2007 | (Bosnia and Herzegovina) Zenica | Finland | Malta | Moldova |
| 2009 | (Bosnia and Herzegovina) Zenica | Switzerland | Poland | Hungary |
| 2010 | (Denmark) Odense | Ukraine | Hungary | Norway |
| 2011 | (Hungary) Zánka | Poland | Denmark | Georgia |
| 2013 | (Slovakia) Bratislava | Finland | Norway | Israel |
| 2014 | (Lithuania) Vilnius | Hungary | Lithuania | Israel |
| 2015 | (Croatia) Zagreb | Denmark | Israel | Croatia |
| 2016 | (Bosnia and Herzegovina) Sarajevo | Latvia | Malta | Turkey |
| 2017 | (Slovakia) Košice | Norway | Austria | Georgia |
| 2018 | (Croatia) Zagreb | Georgia | Turkey | Croatia |
| 2019 | (Croatia) Zagreb | Moldova | Denmark | Austria |
| 2020 | Series not played because of COVID-19 pandemic. | | | |
| 2021 | (Serbia) Belgrade | Israel | Austria | Croatia |
| 2022 | (Serbia) Belgrade | Austria | Bulgaria | Latvia |
| 2023 | (Serbia) Belgrade | Switzerland | Andorra | Slovakia |
| 2024 | (Serbia) Belgrade | Moldova | Slovakia | Lithuania |

== Other Tournaments ==
Emerging Nations
| Year | Host | Champions | Runners-up | Third |
|---|---|---|---|---|
| 2007 | (Poland) Katowice | Finland | Bulgaria | Czech Republic |
| 2008 | (Austria) Vienna | Finland | Czech Republic | Poland |
| 2009 | (Hungary) Zánka | Hungary | Czech Republic | Poland |
| 2010 | (Hungary) Zánka | Hungary | Poland | Czech Republic |
| 2011 | (Hungary) Zánka | Czech Republic | Poland | Hungary |
| 2012 | (Hungary) Zánka | Romania | Hungary | Poland |
