= 2008 FIRA-AER Women's Sevens – Division A =

- Host nation: Belgium (Bosnia and Herzegovina) Bosnia-Herzegovina

(Bosnia and Herzegovina) Zenica (Group B)
- Date: 10–11 May 2008
- Champion: Romania
- Runner-up: Finland
- Third: Israel

Tournament details
- Matches played: 42

(Belgium) Bruges (Group A)
- Date: 30 May–1 June 2008
- Champion: Germany
- Runner-up: Moldova
- Third: Andorra

Tournament details
- Matches played: 42

The 2008 FIRA-AER Women's Sevens – Division A was a European pre-qualifying tournament for the inaugural 2009 Women's Rugby World Cup Sevens. Division B was cancelled for the year 2008 and every team was promoted to Division A. The competition was divided into two groups, Group A was played in Belgium and Group B took place in Bosnia-Herzegovina. The top three teams in Groups A and B advance to the final round of qualification in Limoges, France.

Romania, Finland, Israel and subsequently Czechia of Group A. Germany, Moldova and Andorra of Group B were the teams to advance to the final round. Czechia was added as the best fourth placed team in place of Scotland.

== Teams ==
Group A teams

- Andorra
- Belgium
- Czech Republic
- Denmark
- Germany
- Hungary
- Luxembourg
- Malta
- Moldova
- Norway
- Poland
- Switzerland

Group B teams

- Austria
- Bosnia and Herzegovina
- Bulgaria
- Croatia
- Finland
- Georgia
- Israel
- Latvia
- Lithuania
- Romania
- Serbia
- Slovenia

== Group B ==
The Group B tournament took place on 10 and 11 May in Zenica, Bosnia and Herzegovina.

=== Pool Stages ===
Pool A

Nation	Won	Drawn	Lost	For	Against	Points
Finland	5	0	0	181	0	15
Bulgaria	4	0	1	99	64	13
Latvia	3	0	2	58	68	11
Lithuania	2	0	3	89	57	9
Serbia	1	0	4	27	63	7
Slovenia	0	0	5	0	202	5

10 May 2008

Finland	45–0	Slovenia

10 May 2008

Bulgaria	17–0	Serbia

10 May 2008

Lithuania	24–7	Latvia

10 May 2008

Serbia	27–0	Slovenia

10 May 2008

Finland	29–0	Latvia

10 May 2008

Lithuania	14–24	Bulgaria

10 May 2008

Latvia	41–0	Slovenia

10 May 2008

Lithuania	5–0	Serbia

10 May 2008

Bulgaria	0–45	Finland

10 May 2008

Serbia	0–5	Latvia

10 May 2008

Bulgaria	43–0	Slovenia

10 May 2008

Lithuania	0–26	Finland

11 May 2008

Bulgaria	15–5	Latvia

11 May 2008

Finland	36–0	Serbia

11 May 2008

Lithuania	46–0	Slovenia

Pool B

Nation	Won	Drawn	Lost	For	Against	Points
Romania	5	0	0	161	7	15
Israel	4	0	1	80	36	13
Croatia	3	0	2	84	62	11
Austria	2	0	3	84	42	9
Georgia	1	0	4	38	141	7
Bosnia-Herzegovina	0	0	5	5	164	5

10 May 2008

Austria	34–10	Georgia

10 May 2008

Croatia	7–14	Israel

10 May 2008

Romania	43–0	Bosnia and Herzegovina

10 May 2008

Israel	42–7	Georgia

10 May 2008

Austria	38–5	Bosnia and Herzegovina

10 May 2008

Romania	29–0	Croatia

10 May 2008

Bosnia and Herzegovina	0–14	Georgia

10 May 2008

Romania	22–7	Israel

10 May 2008

Croatia	5–12	Austria

10 May 2008

Israel	12–0	Bosnia and Herzegovina

10 May 2008

Croatia	15–7	Georgia

10 May 2008

Romania	17–0	Austria

11 May 2008

Croatia	57–0	Bosnia and Herzegovina

11 May 2008

Austria	0–5	Israel

11 May 2008

Romania	50–0	Georgia

=== Classification Stages ===
Bowl Semi-finals

Semi-finals
11 May 2008
Serbia	27
Bosnia-Herzegovina	0
11 May 2008
Slovenia	0
Georgia	31

Bowl Final
11 May 2008
Serbia	20
Georgia	0
11th Place
11 May 2008
Bosnia-Herzegovina	10
Slovenia	5

Plate Semi-finals

Semi-finals
11 May 2008
Lithuania	0
Croatia	22
11 May 2008
Latvia	5
Austria	0

Plate Final
11 May 2008
Latvia	17
Croatia	12
7th Place
11 May 2008
Austria	17
Lithuania	12

Cup Semi-finals

Semi-finals
11 May 2008
Finland	31
Israel	0
11 May 2008
Bulgaria	0
Romania	43

Cup Final
11 May 2008
Romania	21
Finland	14
3rd Place
11 May 2008
Israel	7
Bulgaria	5

=== Final standings ===
Legend
Advances to next round

Rank	Team
1st place, gold medalist(s)	Romania
2nd place, silver medalist(s)	Finland
3rd place, bronze medalist(s)	Israel
4	Bulgaria
5	Latvia
6	Croatia
7	Austria
8	Lithuania
9	Serbia
10	Georgia
11	Bosnia-Herzegovina
12	Slovenia

== Group A ==
The Group A tournament took place from 30 May to 1 June 2008 in Bruges, Belgium.

=== Pool Stages ===
Pool A

Nation	Won	Drawn	Lost	For	Against	Points
Moldova	4	0	1	69	29	13
Andorra	4	0	1	75	22	13
Norway	3	0	2	47	40	11
Malta	2	0	3	70	27	9
Switzerland	2	0	3	68	50	9
Luxembourg	0	0	5	10	171	5

Note: Andorra shown by FIRA as first but due to head to head they finished below Moldova

30 May 2008

Andorra	41–0	Luxembourg

30 May 2008

Norway	7–5	Malta

30 May 2008

Switzerland	19–7	Moldova

30 May 2008

Malta	50–0	Luxembourg

30 May 2008

Andorra	5–17	Moldova

30 May 2008

Switzerland	10–14	Norway

30 May 2008

Moldova	20–0	Luxembourg

30 May 2008

Switzerland	0–10	Malta

30 May 2008

Norway	0–10	Andorra

31 May 2008

Malta	5–15	Moldova

31 May 2008

Norway	26–5	Luxembourg

31 May 2008

Switzerland	5–14	Andorra

31 May 2008

Norway	0–10	Moldova

31 May 2008

Andorra	5–0	Malta

31 May 2008

Switzerland	34–5	Luxembourg

Pool B

Nation	Won	Drawn	Lost	For	Against	Points
Germany	5	0	0	216	5	15
Czech Republic	3	0	2	86	74	11
Poland	3	0	2	72	90	11
Belgium	2	0	3	58	90	9
Denmark	1	0	4	33	115	7
Hungary	1	0	4	56	147	7

30 May 2008

Czech Republic	36–14	Hungary

30 May 2008

Belgium	10–14	Poland

30 May 2008

Germany	38–0	Denmark

30 May 2008

Poland	26–10	Hungary

30 May 2008

Czech Republic	31–0	Denmark

30 May 2008

Germany	49–0	Belgium

30 May 2008

Denmark	28–5	Hungary

30 May 2008

Germany	51–0	Poland

30 May 2008

Belgium	17–5	Czech Republic

31 May 2008

Poland	27–5	Denmark

31 May 2008

Belgium	17–22	Hungary

31 May 2008

Germany	38–0	Czech Republic

31 May 2008

Belgium	14–0	Denmark

31 May 2008

Czech Republic	14–5	Poland

31 May 2008

Germany	40–5	Hungary

=== Classification Stages ===
Bowl Semi-finals

Semi-finals
1 June 2008
Switzerland	12
Hungary	10
1 June 2008
Denmark	19
Luxembourg	0

Bowl Final
1 June 2008
Switzerland	31
Denmark	5
11th Place
1 June 2008
Hungary	31
Luxembourg	0

Plate Semi-finals

Semi-finals
1 June 2008
Norway	7
Belgium	10
1 June 2008
Malta	24
Poland	0

Plate Final
1 June 2008
Malta	29
Belgium	5
7th Place
1 June 2008
Norway	17
Poland	10

Cup Semi-finals

Semi-finals
1 June 2008
Moldova	17
Czech Republic	5
1 June 2008
Andorra	0
Germany	50

Cup Final
1 June 2008
Germany	43
Moldova	0
3rd Place
1 June 2008
Andorra	7
Czech Republic	0

=== Final standings ===
Legend
Advances to next round

Rank	Team
1st place, gold medalist(s)	Germany
2nd place, silver medalist(s)	Moldova
3rd place, bronze medalist(s)	Andorra
4	Czech Republic
5	Malta
6	Belgium
7	Norway
8	Poland
9	Switzerland
10	Denmark
11	Hungary
12	Luxembourg
