= 2005 FIRA-AER Women's Sevens – Division B =

- Host nation: Czech Republic
- Date: 14–15 May 2005

Cup
- Champion: Russia
- Runner-up: Germany
- Third: Lithuania

Tournament details
- Matches played: 42

The 2005 FIRA-AER Women's Sevens – Division B was held in Prague, Czech Republic from 14 to 15 May. The tournament was a qualifying tournament for the next year's European Sevens Championship, teams that made the Cup Semi-finals were promoted.

== Teams ==
Twelve teams competed in the tournament. Bosnia failed to appear and were replaced by Czech Republic B.

- Austria
- Bulgaria
- Czech Republic A
- Czech Republic B
- Germany
- Hungary
- Israel
- Lithuania
- Malta
- Norway
- Poland
- Russia

== Group Stage ==
=== Group A ===
Nation	P	W	D	L	PF	PA	PD	Pts
Germany	5	5	0	0	186	7	+179	15
Lithuania	5	4	0	1	98	31	+67	13
Poland	5	3	0	2	55	59	–4	11
Bulgaria	5	2	0	3	52	69	–17	9
Austria	5	1	0	4	10	121	–111	7
Israel	5	0	0	5	7	121	–114	5

14 May 2005

Bulgaria	26–7	Israel

Prague, Czech Republic

14 May 2005

Poland	7–42	Germany

Prague, Czech Republic

14 May 2005

Lithuania	38–0	Austria

Prague, Czech Republic

14 May 2005

Germany	45–0	Israel

Prague, Czech Republic

14 May 2005

Bulgaria	12–5	Austria

Prague, Czech Republic

14 May 2005

Lithuania	15–7	Poland

Prague, Czech Republic

14 May 2005

Austria	5–0	Israel

Prague, Czech Republic

14 May 2005

Lithuania	0–19	Germany

Prague, Czech Republic

14 May 2005

Poland	7–12	Bulgaria

Prague, Czech Republic

14 May 2005

Germany	52–0	Austria

Prague, Czech Republic

14 May 2005

Poland	12–0	Israel

Prague, Czech Republic

14 May 2005

Lithuania	12–5	Bulgaria

Prague, Czech Republic

15 May 2005

Poland	19–0	Austria

Prague, Czech Republic

15 May 2005

Bulgaria	0–28	Germany

Prague, Czech Republic

15 May 2005

Lithuania	33–0	Israel

Prague, Czech Republic

=== Group B ===
Nation	P	W	D	L	PF	PA	PD	Pts
Russia	5	5	0	0	202	5	+197	15
Norway	5	4	0	1	75	28	+47	13
Hungary	5	3	0	2	36	61	–25	11
Czech Republic A	5	2	0	3	29	60	–31	9
Malta	5	1	0	4	15	79	–64	7
Czech Republic B	5	0	0	5	0	124	–124	5

14 May 2005

Czech Republic B	0–10	Malta

Prague, Czech Republic

14 May 2005

Norway	0–28	Russia

Prague, Czech Republic

14 May 2005

Czech Republic A	7–19	Hungary

Prague, Czech Republic

14 May 2005

Russia	43–5	Malta

Prague, Czech Republic

14 May 2005

Czech Republic B	0–7	Hungary

Prague, Czech Republic

14 May 2005

Czech Republic A	0–7	Norway

Prague, Czech Republic

14 May 2005

Hungary	10–0	Malta

Prague, Czech Republic

14 May 2005

Czech Republic A	0–34	Russia

Prague, Czech Republic

14 May 2005

Norway	40–0	Czech Republic B

Prague, Czech Republic

14 May 2005

Russia	47–0	Hungary

Prague, Czech Republic

14 May 2005

Norway	21–0	Malta

Prague, Czech Republic

14 May 2005

Czech Republic A	17–0	Czech Republic B

Prague, Czech Republic

15 May 2005

Norway	5–0	Hungary

Prague, Czech Republic

15 May 2005

Czech Republic B	0–50	Russia

Prague, Czech Republic

15 May 2005

Czech Republic A	5–0	Malta

Prague, Czech Republic

== Classification Stages ==
=== Bowl Semi-final ===
Bowl Semi (9th-12th)
15 May 2005
Austria	19
Czech Republic B	0
15 May 2005
Israel	21
Malta	0

Bowl Final
15 May 2005
Austria	5
Israel	10
11th Place
15 May 2005
Czech Republic B	0
Malta	15

=== Plate Semi-final ===
Plate Semi (5th-8th)
15 May 2005
Bulgaria	7
Czech Republic	14
15 May 2005 (a.e.t.)
Poland	17
Hungary	22

Plate Final
15 May 2005
Czech Republic	21
Hungary	12
7th Place
15 May 2005
Poland	19
Bulgaria	0

=== Cup Semi-final ===
Cup semi (1st-4th)
15 May 2005
Germany	21
Norway	0
15 May 2005
Lithuania	7
Russia	28

Cup Final
15 May 2005
Russia	36
Germany	0
3rd Place
15 May 2005
Lithuania	12
Norway	5
