= 2009 FIRA-AER Women's Sevens – Division B =

International women's rugby sevens tournament

2009 European Women Sevens Championship
- Host nation: Bosnia-Herzegovina
- Date: 6–7 June 2009

Cup
- Champion: Switzerland
- Runner-up: Poland
- Third: Hungary

Tournament details
- Matches played: 29

The 2009 FIRA-AER Women's Sevens – Division B was held from 6 to 7 June in Zenica, Bosnia-Herzegovina. There was no Division B tournament in 2008 as it was replaced by the FIRA-AER Women's Sevens – Division A competition which was a World Cup qualifier.

Switzerland defeated Poland in the Cup final to win the competition. Switzerland was promoted to the 2010 FIRA-AER Women's Sevens – Division A tournament.

== Teams ==
Ten Teams competed in the tournament.

- Bosnia and Herzegovina
- Denmark
- Georgia
- Hungary
- Luxembourg
- Poland
- Serbia
- Slovenia
- Switzerland
- Ukraine

== Pool Stages ==
=== Group A ===
Nation	Won	Drawn	Lost	For	Against
Poland	4	0	0	100	24
Denmark	3	0	1	70	48
Georgia	2	0	2	71	47
Luxembourg	0	1	3	27	56
Slovenia	0	1	3	15	108

6 June 2009

Slovenia	0–34	Poland

6 June 2009

Denmark	17–14	Georgia

6 June 2009

Poland	17–7	Luxembourg

6 June 2009

Denmark	31–0	Slovenia

6 June 2009

Georgia	12–10	Luxembourg

6 June 2009

Poland	34–5	Denmark

6 June 2009

Georgia	33–5	Slovenia

6 June 2009

Denmark	17–0	Luxembourg

7 June 2009

Poland	15–12	Georgia

7 June 2009

Luxembourg	10–10	Slovenia

=== Group B ===
Nation	Won	Drawn	Lost	For	Against
Switzerland	4	0	0	149	0
Hungary	3	0	1	67	32
Ukraine	2	0	2	74	50
Bosnia and Herzegovina	1	0	3	10	92
Serbia	0	0	4	5	131

6 June 2009

Ukraine	0–24	Switzerland

6 June 2009

Serbia	0–29	Hungary

6 June 2009

Switzerland	42–0	Bosnia and Herzegovina

6 June 2009

Serbia	0–41	Ukraine

6 June 2009

Hungary	12–0	Bosnia and Herzegovina

6 June 2009

Switzerland	51–0	Serbia

6 June 2009

Hungary	26–0	Ukraine

6 June 2009

Bosnia and Herzegovina	0–33	Ukraine

7 June 2009

Switzerland	32–0	Hungary

7 June 2009

Serbia	5–10	Bosnia and Herzegovina

== Classification Stages ==
=== Bowl Final ===
Bowl Final
7 June 2009
Slovenia	36
Serbia	5

=== Plate Semi-finals ===
Semi-finals
7 June 2009
Georgia	14
Bosnia-Herzegovina	5
7 June 2009
Luxembourg	0
Ukraine	5

Plate Final
7 June 2009
Ukraine	10
Georgia	7
7th Place
7 June 2009
Luxembourg	5
Bosnia-Herzegovina	0

=== Cup Semi-finals ===
Semi-finals
7 June 2009
Poland	21
Hungary	12
7 June 2009
Denmark	0
Switzerland	39

Cup Final
7 June 2009
Switzerland	37
Poland	0
3rd Place
7 June 2009
Hungary	22
Denmark	10
