= 2007 FIRA-AER Women's Sevens – Division B =

- Host nation: Bosnia and Herzegovina
- Date: 19–20 May 2007

Cup
- Champion: Finland
- Runner-up: Malta
- Third: Moldova

Tournament details
- Matches played: 35

The 2007 FIRA-AER Women's Sevens – Division B was held at Zenica in Bosnia and Herzegovina from 19 to 20 May 2007. Finland defeated Malta for the Division B title.

== Teams ==
Eleven teams competed in the tournament and was divided into two pools. Slovakia and Georgia withdrew from the tournament, Moldova joined leaving one team missing in Pool B.

- Austria
- Bosnia and Herzegovina
- Denmark
- Finland
- Hungary
- Israel
- Latvia
- Luxembourg
- Malta
- Moldova
- Serbia

== Pool Stages ==
Pool A

Nation	Won	Drawn	Lost	For	Against	Points
Malta	4	1	0	110	21	14
Finland	4	0	1	151	19	13
Denmark	3	0	2	78	38	11
Hungary	2	1	2	39	48	10
Serbia	1	0	4	16	152	7
Bosnia-Herzegovina	0	0	5	0	116	5

Malta	14–0	Denmark

Malta	7–7	Hungary

Malta	19–14	Finland

Malta	17–0	Bosnia-Herzegovina

Malta	53–0	Serbia

Denmark	10–5	Hungary

Denmark	0–19	Finland

Denmark	41–0	Bosnia-Herzegovina

Denmark	27–0	Serbia

Hungary	0–31	Finland

Hungary	10–0	Bosnia-Herzegovina

Hungary	17–0	Serbia

Finland	32–0	Bosnia-Herzegovina

Finland	55–0	Serbia

Bosnia-Herzegovina	0–16	Serbia

Pool B

Nation	Won	Drawn	Lost	For	Against	Points
Austria	4	0	0	102	15	12
Moldova	3	0	1	62	29	10
Israel	2	0	2	30	24	8
Luxembourg	1	0	3	32	94	6
Latvia	0	0	4	5	69	4

Luxembourg	17–5	Latvia

Moldova	25–10	Luxembourg

Israel	0–5	Moldova

Israel	0–19	Austria

Moldova	22–0	Latvia

Austria	44–5	Luxembourg

Austria	20–0	Latvia

Israel	20–0	Luxembourg

Austria	19–10	Moldova

Israel	10–0	Latvia

== Classification Stages ==
=== Cup Semi-finals ===
Semi-finals
Austria	0
Finland	27
Moldova	5
Malta	17

Cup Final
Finland	10
Malta	5
3rd Place
Moldova	12
Austria	0

=== Plate Semi-finals ===
Semi-finals
Israel	10
Hungary	5
Luxembourg	5
Denmark	29

Plate Final
Denmark	27
Israel	0
7th Place
Hungary	24
Luxembourg	5

=== Bowl Semi-finals ===
Semi-finals
Latvia	17
Bosnia-Herzegovina	5
Serbia	0
BYE	0

Bowl Final
Serbia	17
Latvia	0
11th Place
Bosnia-Herzegovina	0
BYE	0
