= 2011 FIRA-AER Women's Sevens – Division 3 =

International women's rugby sevens tournament

- Host nation: Hungary
- Date: 5–6 June 2011

Cup
- Champion: Poland
- Runner-up: Denmark
- Third: Georgia

Tournament details
- Matches played: 29

The 2011 FIRA-AER Women's Sevens – Division 3 tournament was held on 5 and 6 June 2011 in Zánka, Hungary. Poland won the competition after defeating Denmark in the Cup final and Georgia beat hosts, Hungary, to win third place.

== Teams ==
Ten teams competed at the tournament. Following the promotion of Norway to Division 2, a Barbarians team was created to fill their place.

- Barbarians
- Bosnia and Herzegovina
- Denmark
- Georgia
- Hungary
- Lithuania
- Luxembourg
- Poland
- Serbia
- Slovenia

== Pool Stages ==
=== Group A ===
Nation	Won	Drawn	Lost	For	Against	Points
Hungary	4	0	0	117	20	12
Denmark	3	0	1	102	41	10
Lithuania	2	0	2	79	58	8
Serbia	1	0	3	48	90	6
Slovenia	0	0	4	0	138	4

5 June 2011

Serbia	5–31	Hungary

5 June 2011

Lithuania	15–22	Denmark

5 June 2011

Hungary	36–0	Slovenia

5 June 2011

Lithuania	26–12	Serbia

5 June 2011

Denmark	38–0	Slovenia

5 June 2011

Hungary	24–5	Lithuania

5 June 2011

Denmark	33–0	Serbia

5 June 2011

Lithuania	33–0	Slovenia

6 June 2011

Hungary	26–10	Denmark

6 June 2011

Slovenia	0–31	Serbia

=== Group B ===
Nation	Won	Drawn	Lost	For	Against	Points
Georgia	4	0	0	136	14	12
Poland	3	0	1	88	31	10
Luxembourg	2	0	2	39	59	8
Barbarians	1	0	3	59	82	6
Bosnia and Herzegovina	0	0	4	0	136	4

5 June 2011

Barbarians	0–33	Poland

5 June 2011

Georgia	33–0	Luxembourg

5 June 2011

Poland	34–0	Bosnia and Herzegovina

5 June 2011

Georgia	34–7	Barbarians

5 June 2011

Luxembourg	19–0	Bosnia and Herzegovina

5 June 2011

Poland	7–26	Georgia

5 June 2011

Luxembourg	15–12	Barbarians

5 June 2011

Georgia	43–0	Bosnia and Herzegovina

6 June 2011

Poland	14–5	Luxembourg

6 June 2011

Bosnia and Herzegovina	0–40	Barbarians

== Classification Stages ==
=== 9th Place Playoff ===
6 June 2011

Bosnia and Herzegovina	31–0	Slovenia

=== Plate Semi-finals ===
Semi-finals
6 June 2011
Lithuania	17
Barbarians	5
6 June 2011
Luxembourg	15
Serbia	17

Plate Final
6 June 2011
Lithuania	31
Serbia	0
7th Place
6 June 2011
Luxembourg	29
Barbarians	12

=== Cup Semi-finals ===
Semi-finals
6 June 2011
Hungary	10
Poland	12
6 June 2011
Georgia	21
Denmark	26

Cup Final
6 June 2011
Poland	24
Denmark	0
3rd Place
6 June 2011
Georgia	28
Hungary	7
