= 2004 FIRA-AER Women's Sevens =

- Host nation: France
- Date: May 21–22, 2004

Cup
- Champion: England
- Runner-up: Italy

Plate
- Winner: Switzerland
- Runner-up: Sweden

Bowl
- Winner: Lithuania
- Runner-up: (France) Limousin

Shield
- Winner: Poland
- Runner-up: Norway

Tournament details
- Matches played: 48

The 2004 FIRA-AER Women's Sevens is the second edition of the European Women's Sevens Championship. It took place between the 21 and 22 May 2004 at Limoges.

England were crowned European Women's Sevens Champions after defeating Italy 38–7.

== Pool Stage ==
Key to colours in group tables
Teams that advanced to the Cup Quarterfinals
Teams advanced to the Shield Quarterfinals

=== Pool A ===
Nation	Won	Drawn	Lost	For	Against	Points
Spain	3	0	0	97	0	9
Croatia	2	0	1	38	39	7
(France) Limousin	1	0	2	31	64	5
Belgium	0	0	3	10	73	3

21 May

Spain	29–0	Croatia

21 May

Belgium	10–21	(France) Limousin

21 May

Spain	35–0	(France) Limousin

21 May

Belgium	0–19	Croatia

21 May

Croatia	19–10	(France) Limousin

21 May

Spain	33–0	Belgium

=== Pool B ===
Nation	Won	Drawn	Lost	For	Against	Points
France	3	0	0	138	0	9
Portugal	2	0	1	86	32	7
Norway	1	0	2	20	75	5
Bosnia and Herzegovina	0	0	3	0	132	3

21 May

France	48–0	Norway

21 May

Portugal	59–0	Bosnia & Herzegovina

21 May

France	58–0	Bosnia & Herzegovina

21 May

Portugal	27–5	Norway

21 May

Norway	15–0	Bosnia & Herzegovina

21 May

France	32–0	Portugal

=== Pool C ===
Nation	Won	Drawn	Lost	For	Against	Points
England	3	0	0	134	7	9
Italy	2	0	1	87	35	7
Lithuania	1	0	2	21	92	5
Czech Republic	0	0	3	0	108	3

21 May

England	47–0	Czech Republic

21 May

Italy	40–0	Lithuania

21 May

England	52–0	Lithuania

21 May

Italy	40–0	Czech Republic

21 May

Czech Republic	0–21	Lithuania

21 May

England	35–7	Italy

=== Pool D ===
Nation	Won	Drawn	Lost	For	Against	Points
Sweden	3	0	0	66	0	9
Switzerland	2	0	1	50	19	7
Poland	0	1	2	12	57	4
Bulgaria	0	1	2	24	78	4

21 May

Switzerland	33–12	Bulgaria

21 May

Sweden	28–0	Poland

21 May

Switzerland	17–0	Poland

21 May

Sweden	31–0	Bulgaria

21 May

Poland	12–12	Bulgaria

21 May

Switzerland	0–7	Sweden

== Classification Stages ==
=== Cup Quarter-finals ===
Quarter-finals
England	31
Switzerland	0
France	51
Croatia	0
Italy	21
Sweden	14
Spain	7
Portugal	0

Semi-finals
England	33
France	0
Italy	22
Spain	7

Cup Final
England	38
Italy	7
3rd Place
France	27
Spain	14

=== Plate Semi-finals ===
Semi-finals
Switzerland	27
Croatia	0
Sweden	28
Portugal	0

Plate Final
Switzerland	12
Sweden	7
7th Place
Croatia	5
Portugal	0

=== Bowl Quarter-finals ===
Quarter-finals
Lithuania	40
Bulgaria	0
Belgium	7
Norway	0
(France) Limousin	41
Bosnia & Herzegovina	0
Czech Republic	7
Poland	0

Semi-finals
Lithuania	21
Belgium	0
(France) Limousin	32
Czech Republic	12

Bowl Final
Lithuania	29
(France) Limousin	7
11th Place
Belgium	14
Czech Republic	0

=== Shield Semi-finals ===
Semi-finals
Poland	66
Bosnia & Herzegovina	0
Norway	14
Bulgaria	0

Shield Final
Poland	33
Norway	17
15th Place
Bulgaria	19
Bosnia & Herzegovina	0
