= 2022 Rugby Europe Women's Sevens Conference =

- Hosts: Serbia
- Date: 4–5 June 2021
- Nations: 13

Final positions
- Champions: Austria
- Runners-up: Bulgaria
- Third: Latvia

Series details
- Matches played: 34

The 2022 Rugby Europe Women's Sevens Conference was held in Belgrade from 4 to 5 June 2022. The tournament is played in two phases, the group stage and the knockout stage for placement.

== Participating nations ==
- Andorra
- Austria
- Bulgaria
- Croatia
- Estonia
- Latvia
- Lithuania
- Luxembourg
- Malta
- Monaco
- Montenegro
- Slovakia
- Switzerland

== Tournament ==
=== Group stage ===
All times in Central European Summer Time (UTC+02:00)

==== Pool A ====
| Team | Pld | W | D | L | PD | Pts |
|---|---|---|---|---|---|---|
| Austria | 4 | 4 | 0 | 0 | +150 | 12 |
| Luxembourg | 4 | 3 | 0 | 1 | +27 | 10 |
| Lithuania | 4 | 2 | 0 | 2 | +29 | 8 |
| Montenegro | 4 | 1 | 0 | 3 | -71 | 6 |
| Estonia | 4 | 0 | 0 | 4 | -135 | 4 |

4 June 2022
10:00

| Austria | 38–0; Report | Montenegro |

King Peter 1 Stadium, Belgrade, Serbia

4 June 2022
10:22

| Luxembourg | 17–12; Report | Lithuania |

King Peter 1 Stadium, Belgrade, Serbia

4 June 2022
13:00

| Austria | 44–5; Report | Estonia |

King Peter 1 Stadium, Belgrade, Serbia

4 June 2022
13:22

| Luxembourg | 19–7; Report | Montenegro |

King Peter 1 Stadium, Belgrade, Serbia

4 June 2022
16:00

| Austria | 40–0; Report | Luxembourg |

King Peter 1 Stadium, Belgrade, Serbia

4 June 2022
16:22

| Lithuania | 29–0; Report | Estonia |

King Peter 1 Stadium, Belgrade, Serbia

4 June 2022
18:22

| Lithuania | 45–7; Report | Montenegro |

King Peter 1 Stadium, Belgrade, Serbia

5 June 2022
10:00

| Luxembourg | 50–0; Report | Estonia |

King Peter 1 Stadium, Belgrade, Serbia

5 June 2022
11:44

| Austria | 33–0; Report | Lithuania |

King Peter 1 Stadium, Belgrade, Serbia

5 June 2022
12:06

| Estonia | 5–22; Report | Montenegro |

King Peter 1 Stadium, Belgrade, Serbia

==== Pool B ====
| Team | Pld | W | D | L | PD | Pts |
|---|---|---|---|---|---|---|
| Bulgaria | 3 | 3 | 0 | 0 | +59 | 9 |
| Croatia | 3 | 2 | 0 | 1 | +14 | 7 |
| Slovakia | 3 | 1 | 0 | 2 | +14 | 5 |
| Monaco | 3 | 0 | 0 | 3 | -87 | 3 |

4 June 2022
10:44

| Croatia | 15–14; Report | Slovakia |

King Peter 1 Stadium, Belgrade, Serbia

4 June 2022
11:06

| Bulgaria | 36–0; Report | Monaco |

King Peter 1 Stadium, Belgrade, Serbia

4 June 2022
13:44

| Croatia | 22–0; Report | Monaco |

King Peter 1 Stadium, Belgrade, Serbia

4 June 2022
14:06

| Bulgaria | 26–12; Report | Slovakia |

King Peter 1 Stadium, Belgrade, Serbia

4 June 2022
16:44

| Croatia | 10–19; Report | Bulgaria |

King Peter 1 Stadium, Belgrade, Serbia

4 June 2022
17:06

| Monaco | 0–29; Report | Slovakia |

King Peter 1 Stadium, Belgrade, Serbia

==== Pool C ====
| Team | Pld | W | D | L | PD | Pts |
|---|---|---|---|---|---|---|
| Latvia | 3 | 3 | 0 | 0 | +40 | 9 |
| Switzerland | 3 | 2 | 0 | 1 | +15 | 7 |
| Malta | 3 | 1 | 0 | 2 | -26 | 5 |
| Andorra | 3 | 0 | 0 | 3 | -29 | 3 |

4 June 2022
11:28

| Latvia | 21–7; Report | Malta |

King Peter 1 Stadium, Belgrade, Serbia

4 June 2022
11:50

| Andorra | 5–12; Report | Switzerland |

King Peter 1 Stadium, Belgrade, Serbia

4 June 2022
14:28

| Latvia | 7–0; Report | Switzerland |

King Peter 1 Stadium, Belgrade, Serbia

4 June 2022
14:50

| Andorra | 14–17; Report | Malta |

King Peter 1 Stadium, Belgrade, Serbia

4 June 2022
17:28

| Latvia | 26–7; Report | Andorra |

King Peter 1 Stadium, Belgrade, Serbia

4 June 2022
17:50

| Switzerland | 27–12; Report | Malta |

King Peter 1 Stadium, Belgrade, Serbia

=== Knockout stage ===
==== Cup ====
Semi-finals
5 June 2022 – 13:44 Report
Austria | 24
Latvia | 0
5 June 2022 – 15:00 Report
Bulgaria | 22
Luxembourg | 5

Finale
5 June 2022 – 18:00 Report
Austria | 50
Bulgaria | 0
Third place
5 June 2022 – 17:34 Report
Latvia | 24
Luxembourg | 5

==== 5th Place ====
Semi-finals
5 June 2022 – 13:00 Report
Croatia | 33
Lithuania | 10
5 June 2022 – 13:22 Report
Switzerland | 29
Slovakia | 5

Fifth place
5 June 2022 – 16:22 Report
Croatia | 0
Switzerland | 15
Seventh place
5 June 2022 – 16:00 Report
Lithuania | 7
Slovakia | 26

==== 9th Place ====
Semi-finals
5 June 2022 – 14:16 Report
Montenegro | 0
Andorra | 38
5 June 2022 – 14:38 Report
Malta | 22
Monaco | 0

Final
5 June 2022 – 17:22 Report
Andorra | 17
Malta | 0
Fifteenth place
5 June 2022 – 17:00 Report
Montenegro | 0
Monaco | 28

== Standings ==
Legend
Promoted to 2023 Trophy

| Rank | Team |
|---|---|
| 1st place, gold medalist(s) | Austria |
| 2nd place, silver medalist(s) | Bulgaria |
| 3rd place, bronze medalist(s) | Latvia |
| 4 | Luxembourg |
| 5 | Switzerland |
| 6 | Croatia |
| 7 | Slovakia |
| 8 | Lithuania |
| 9 | Andorra |
| 10 | Malta |
| 11 | Monaco |
| 12 | Montenegro |
| 13 | Estonia |
