= 2009 FIRA-AER Women's Sevens – Emerging Nations =

International women's rugby sevens tournament

- Host nation: Hungary
- Date: 12 April 2009

Cup
- Champion: Hungary
- Runner-up: Czech Republic
- Third: Poland

Tournament details
- Matches played: 20

The 2009 FIRA-AER Women's Sevens – Emerging Nations tournament was held on 12 April 2009 at Zanka, Hungary. Hosts, Hungary, won the competition in the Cup final against the Czech Republic.

== Teams ==
Eight teams competed in the tournament.

- Austria
- Bosnia and Herzegovina
- Croatia
- Czech Republic
- Europe VII
- Finland Development
- Hungary
- Poland

== Pool Stages ==
=== Group A ===
Nation	Won	Drawn	Lost	For	Against
Austria	3	0	0	55	19
Poland	2	0	1	71	17
Finland Development	1	0	2	38	22
Europe VII	0	0	3	5	111

12 April 2009

Finland	26–0	Europe VII

12 April 2009

Austria	12–7	Poland

12 April 2009

Austria	31–5	Europe VII

12 April 2009

Finland	5–10	Poland

12 April 2009

Poland	54–0	Europe VII

12 April 2009

Finland	7–12	Austria

=== Group B ===
Nation	Won	Drawn	Lost	For	Against
Hungary	1	2	0	45	35
Czech Republic	1	1	1	35	38
Bosnia and Herzegovina	1	1	1	24	29
Croatia	0	2	1	31	33

12 April 2009

Czech Republic	14–14	Hungary

12 April 2009

Croatia	5–5	Bosnia-Herzegovina

12 April 2009

Croatia	14–14	Hungary

12 April 2009

Czech Republic	7–12	Bosnia-Herzegovina

12 April 2009

Bosnia-Herzegovina	7–17	Hungary

12 April 2009

Czech Republic	14–12	Croatia

== Classification Stages ==
=== Bowl Semi-finals ===
Semi-finals
Finland	5
Croatia	0
Bosnia-Herzegovina	5
Europe VII	0

Bowl Final
Finland	5
Bosnia-Herzegovina	0
7th Place
Croatia	40
Europe VII	0

=== Cup and Plate Semi-finals ===
Semi-finals
Austria	0
Czech Republic	19
Hungary	21
Poland	14

Cup Final
Hungary	26
Czech Republic	14
Plate Final
Poland	14
Austria	7
