= 2008 FIRA-AER Women's Sevens – Emerging Nations =

International women's rugby sevens tournament

- Host nation: Austria
- Date: 21–24 March 2008

Cup
- Champion: Finland
- Runner-up: Czech Republic
- Third: Poland

Tournament details
- Matches played: 29

The 2008 FIRA-AER Women's Sevens – Emerging Nations was held in Vienna, Austria from 21 to 24 March 2008. Finland won the tournament after beating Czechia in the Cup final.

== Teams ==
Ten teams competed in the tournament.

- Austria
- Bosnia and Herzegovina
- Bulgaria
- Croatia
- Czech Republic
- Finland
- Hungary
- Luxembourg
- Poland
- Serbia

== Pool Stages ==
=== Pool A ===
Nation	Won	Drawn	Lost	For	Against
Finland	4	0	0	125	14
Czech Republic	2	1	1	61	39
Bulgaria	2	1	1	27	47
Serbia	1	0	3	41	93
Luxembourg	0	0	4	26	87

21 March 2008

Serbia	0–25	Czech Republic

21 March 2008

Bulgaria	0–25	Finland

21 March 2008

Czech Republic	31–0	Luxembourg

21 March 2008

Bulgaria	12–10	Serbia

22 March 2008

Finland	22–7	Luxembourg

22 March 2008

Czech Republic	5–5	Bulgaria

22 March 2008

Finland	44–7	Serbia

22 March 2008

Bulgaria	10–7	Luxembourg

23 March 2008

Czech Republic	0–34	Finland

23 March 2008

Luxembourg	12–24	Serbia

=== Pool B ===
Nation	Won	Drawn	Lost	For	Against
Croatia	3	0	1	74	26
Poland	3	0	1	75	31
Austria	3	0	1	78	50
Hungary	1	0	3	43	60
Bosnia and Herzegovina	0	0	4	0	103

21 March 2008

Bosnia and Herzegovina	0–20	Poland

21 March 2008

Croatia	7–14	Austria

21 March 2008

Poland	17–5	Hungary

21 March 2008

Croatia	26–0	Bosnia and Herzegovina

22 March 2008

Austria	21–17	Hungary

22 March 2008

Poland	12–19	Croatia

22 March 2008

Austria	36–0	Bosnia and Herzegovina

22 March 2008

Croatia	22–0	Hungary

23 March 2008

Poland	26–7	Austria

23 March 2008

Hungary	21–0	Bosnia and Herzegovina

== Classification Stages ==
=== Bowl Final ===
Bowl Final
24 March 2008
Luxembourg	25
Bosnia-Herzegovina	0

=== Plate Semi-final ===
Semi-finals
23 March 2008
Bulgaria	17
Hungary	7
23 March 2008
Croatia	21
Serbia	0

Plate Final
24 March 2008
Croatia	7
Bulgaria	0
7th Place
24 March 2008
Serbia	14
Hungary	0

=== Cup Semi-final ===
Semi-finals
23 March 2008
Finland	29
Austria	5
23 March 2008
Czech Republic	25
Poland	0

Cup Final
24 March 2008
Finland	34
Czech Republic	0
3rd Place
24 March 2008
Poland	22
Austria	7
