= 2011 FIRA-AER Women's Sevens – Emerging Nations =

Women's rugby sevens tournament

- Host nation: Hungary
- Date: 23–24 April 2011

Cup
- Champion: Czech Republic
- Runner-up: Poland
- Third: Hungary

The 2011 FIRA-AER Women's Sevens – Emerging Nations tournament took place from 23 to 24 April 2011 at Zánka, Hungary. The Czech Republic defeated Poland in the final to win the competition.

== Teams ==
14 teams competed in the tournament. Crovenia was a combined Croatia and Slovenia team.

- Austria
- Bulgaria
- Crovenia
- Czech Republic
- Czech Republic B
- Denmark
- Hungary
- Luxembourg
- Nada Split
- Poland
- Poland B
- Romania
- Serbia
- Slovakia

== Pool Stages ==
=== Pool A ===
Nation	Won	Drawn	Lost	For	Against	Points
Poland	3	0	0	71	15	4
Romania	2	0	1	71	15	4
Austria	1	0	2	29	43	2
Bulgaria	0	0	3	42	92	2

23 April 2011

Romania	21–5	Austria

23 April 2011

Bulgaria	10–22	Poland

23 April 2011

Austria	17–12	Bulgaria

23 April 2011

Romania	7–10	Poland

24 April 2011

Bulgaria	0–43	Romania

24 April 2011

Austria	7–10	Poland

=== Pool B ===
Nation	Won	Drawn	Lost	For	Against	Points
Czech Republic	3	0	0	74	24	6
Hungary	2	0	1	54	21	4
Denmark	1	0	2	52	52	2
Nada Split	0	0	3	0	83	0

23 April 2011

Czech Republic	29–0	Nada Split

23 April 2011

Hungary	28–0	Denmark

23 April 2011

Nada Split	0–14	Hungary

23 April 2011

Czech Republic	24–12	Denmark

24 April 2011

Hungary	12–21	Czech Republic

24 April 2011

Denmark	40–0	Nada Split

=== Pool C ===
Nation	Won	Drawn	Lost	For	Against	Points
Luxembourg	1	0	1	28	29	2
Crovenia	1	0	1	17	28	2
Czech Republic B	1	0	1	31	19	2

Luxembourg	21–5	Crovenia

Crovenia	12–7	Czech Republic B

Luxembourg	7–24	Czech Republic B

=== Pool D ===
Nation	Won	Drawn	Lost	For	Against	Points
Serbia	1	0	1	26	22	2
Slovakia	0	0	2	15	40	0
Poland B	2	0	0	43	22	4

Serbia	14–5	Slovakia

Slovakia	10–26	Poland B

Serbia	12–17	Poland B

== Classification Stages ==
=== 13th place ===
24 April 2011

Czech Republic B	29–0	Poland B

=== 9th-12th place ===
Semi-finals
24 April 2011
Crovenia	22
Slovakia	0
24 April 2011
Serbia	22
Luxembourg	5

9th Place
24 April 2011
Crovenia	36
Serbia	7
11th Place
24 April 2011
Luxembourg	31
Slovakia	5

=== 7th place ===
24 April 2011

Bulgaria	15–0	Nada Split

=== 5th place ===
24 April 2011

Austria	14–12	Denmark

=== 3rd place ===
24 April 2011

Romania	7–17	Hungary

=== Final ===
24 April 2011

Poland	5–27	Czech Republic
