= 2006 FIRA-AER Women's Sevens – Division B =

- Host nation: France
- Date: 25–27 May 2006

Cup
- Champion: Romania
- Runner-up: Andorra
- Third: Poland

Tournament details
- Matches played: 29

The 2006 FIRA-AER Women's Sevens – Division B was held in Limoges, France from 25 to 27 May 2006. Romania won the tournament and Andorra were runners-up.

== Teams ==
Ten teams competed in the tournament.

- Andorra
- Austria
- Bosnia and Herzegovina
- Bulgaria
- Hungary
- Israel
- Luxembourg
- Malta
- Poland
- Romania

== Pool Games ==
=== Pool One ===
| Nation | Won | Drawn | Lost | For | Against | Points |
|---|---|---|---|---|---|---|
| Romania | 4 | 0 | 0 | 88 | 7 | 12 |
| Bulgaria | 3 | 0 | 1 | 53 | 19 | 10 |
| Israel | 2 | 0 | 2 | 29 | 38 | 8 |
| Bosnia and Herzegovina | 1 | 0 | 3 | 15 | 63 | 6 |
| Luxembourg | 0 | 0 | 4 | 5 | 63 | 4 |

25 May 2006

| Luxembourg | 0–17 | Romania |

Limoges, France

25 May 2006

| Bulgaria | 12–0 | Israel |

Limoges, France

25 May 2006

| Romania | 26–0 | Bosnia and Herzegovina |

Limoges, France

25 May 2006

| Bulgaria | 14–0 | Luxembourg |

Limoges, France

25 May 2006

| Israel | 5–0 | Bosnia and Herzegovina |

Limoges, France

25 May 2006

| Romania | 19–0 | Bulgaria |

Limoges, France

26 May 2006

| Israel | 17–0 | Luxembourg |

Limoges, France

26 May 2006

| Bulgaria | 27–0 | Bosnia and Herzegovina |

Limoges, France

26 May 2006

| Romania | 26–7 | Israel |

Limoges, France

26 May 2006

| Bosnia and Herzegovina | 15–5 | Luxembourg |

Limoges, France

=== Pool Two ===
| Nation | Won | Drawn | Lost | For | Against | Points |
|---|---|---|---|---|---|---|
| Andorra | 3 | 0 | 1 | 61 | 7 | 10 |
| Poland | 3 | 0 | 1 | 56 | 17 | 10 |
| Malta | 2 | 0 | 2 | 31 | 32 | 8 |
| Hungary | 1 | 0 | 3 | 19 | 46 | 6 |
| Austria | 1 | 0 | 3 | 5 | 70 | 6 |

25 May 2006

| Andorra | 17–0 | Poland |

Limoges, France

25 May 2006

| Hungary | 0–5 | Austria |

Limoges, France

25 May 2006

| Poland | 5–0 | Malta |

Limoges, France

25 May 2006

| Hungary | 7–0 | Andorra |

Limoges, France

25 May 2006

| Austria | 0–12 | Malta |

Limoges, France

25 May 2006

| Poland | 22–0 | Hungary |

Limoges, France

26 May 2006

| Austria | 0–29 | Andorra |

Limoges, France

26 May 2006

| Hungary | 12–19 | Malta |

Limoges, France

26 May 2006

| Poland | 29–0 | Austria |

Limoges, France

26 May 2006

| Malta | 0–15 | Andorra |

Limoges, France

== Classification Stages ==
=== 1st-4th Place Semi-finals ===
Semi-finals
26 May 2006
Romania | 12
Poland | 10
26 May 2006
Bulgaria | 0
Andorra | 22

Cup Final
27 May 2006
Romania | 7
Andorra | 0
3rd Place
27 May 2006
Poland | 10
Bulgaria | 7

=== 5th-8th Place Semi-finals ===
Semi-finals
26 May 2006
Israel | 7
Hungary | 0
26 May 2006
Bosnia-Herzegovina | 0
Malta | 24

Plate Final
27 May 2006
Israel | 7
Malta | 0
7th Place
27 May 2006
Hungary | 29
Bosnia-Herzegovina | 5

=== 9th-10th Final ===
| Bowl Final |
| 27 May 2006 |
| Austria | 26 |
| Luxembourg | 0 |
