= 2010 FIRA-AER Women's Sevens – Division B =

International women's rugby sevens tournament

- Host nation: Denmark
- Date: 22–23 May 2010

Cup
- Champion: Ukraine
- Runner-up: Hungary
- Third: Norway

Tournament details
- Matches played: 42

The 2010 FIRA-AER Women's Sevens – Division B tournament took place on 22 and 23 May 2010 in Odense, Denmark. Ukraine defeated Hungary in the Cup final to win the Championship.

== Teams ==
Twelve teams competed in the tournament.

- Bosnia and Herzegovina
- Denmark
- Georgia
- Hungary
- Lithuania
- Luxembourg
- Nordic Barbarians
- Norway
- Poland
- Serbia
- Slovenia
- Ukraine

== Pool Stages ==
=== Group A ===
| Nation | Won | Drawn | Lost | For | Against | Points |
|---|---|---|---|---|---|---|
| Ukraine | 5 | 0 | 0 | 198 | 7 | 15 |
| Poland | 3 | 1 | 1 | 102 | 45 | 13 |
| Georgia | 3 | 1 | 1 | 94 | 40 | 11 |
| Nordic Barbarians | 2 | 0 | 3 | 29 | 49 | 9 |
| Serbia | 1 | 0 | 4 | 12 | 152 | 7 |
| Slovenia | 0 | 0 | 5 | 0 | 142 | 5 |

22 May 2010

| Georgia | 7–0 | Nordic Barbarians |

22 May 2010

| Ukraine | 52–0 | Slovenia |

22 May 2010

| Poland | 24–0 | Serbia |

22 May 2010

| Slovenia | 0–5 | Nordic Barbarians |

22 May 2010

| Georgia | 35–0 | Serbia |

22 May 2010

| Poland | 0–31 | Ukraine |

22 May 2010

| Serbia | 0–24 | Nordic Barbarians |

22 May 2010

| Poland | 42–0 | Slovenia |

22 May 2010

| Ukraine | 26–7 | Georgia |

22 May 2010

| Slovenia | 0–12 | Serbia |

22 May 2010

| Ukraine | 20–0 | Nordic Barbarians |

22 May 2010

| Poland | 14–14 | Georgia |

23 May 2010

| Ukraine | 69–0 | Serbia |

23 May 2010

| Georgia | 31–0 | Slovenia |

23 May 2010

| Poland | 22–0 | Nordic Barbarians |

=== Group B ===
| Nation | Won | Drawn | Lost | For | Against | Points |
|---|---|---|---|---|---|---|
| Hungary | 5 | 0 | 0 | 176 | 22 | 15 |
| Norway | 4 | 0 | 1 | 128 | 24 | 13 |
| Lithuania | 3 | 0 | 2 | 79 | 71 | 11 |
| Denmark | 2 | 0 | 3 | 78 | 57 | 9 |
| Luxembourg | 1 | 0 | 4 | 24 | 156 | 7 |
| Bosnia-Herzegovina | 0 | 0 | 5 | 0 | 155 | 5 |

22 May 2010

| Luxembourg | 12–31 | Lithuania |

22 May 2010

| Denmark | 22–0 | Bosnia-Herzegovina |

22 May 2010

| Hungary | 19–0 | Norway |

22 May 2010

| Bosnia-Herzegovina | 0–31 | Lithuania |

22 May 2010

| Luxembourg | 0–34 | Norway |

22 May 2010

| Hungary | 26–17 | Denmark |

22 May 2010

| Norway | 21–5 | Lithuania |

22 May 2010

| Hungary | 41–0 | Bosnia-Herzegovina |

22 May 2010

| Denmark | 34–0 | Luxembourg |

22 May 2010

| Bosnia-Herzegovina | 0–54 | Norway |

22 May 2010

| Denmark | 5–12 | Lithuania |

22 May 2010

| Hungary | 57–5 | Luxembourg |

23 May 2010

| Denmark | 0–19 | Norway |

23 May 2010

| Luxembourg | 7–0 | Bosnia-Herzegovina |

23 May 2010

| Hungary | 33–0 | Lithuania |

== Classification Stages ==
Bowl Semi-finals

Semi-finals
23 May 2010
Bosnia-Herzegovina | 5
Serbia | 7
23 May 2010
Slovenia | 5
Luxembourg | 22

Bowl Final
23 May 2010
Luxembourg | 17
Serbia | 12
11th Place
23 May 2010
Slovenia | 15
Bosnia-Herzegovina | 0

Plate Semi-finals

Semi-finals
23 May 2010
Georgia | 19
Denmark | 15
23 May 2010
Nordic Barbarians | 0
Lithuania | 7

Plate Final
23 May 2010
Georgia | 31
Lithuania | 5
7th Place
23 May 2010
Denmark | 10
Nordic Barbarians | 7

Cup Semi-finals

Semi-finals
23 May 2010
Ukraine | 15
Norway | 0
23 May 2010
Poland | 0
Hungary | 43

Cup Final
23 May 2010
Ukraine | 41
Hungary | 0
3rd Place
23 May 2010
Norway | 12
Poland | 0
