= 2011 FIRA-AER Women's Sevens – Division 2 =

International women's rugby sevens tournament

- Host nation: Latvia
- Date: 2–3 July 2011

Cup
- Champion: Ukraine
- Runner-up: Switzerland
- Third: Czech Republic

Tournament details
- Matches played: 42

The 2011 FIRA-AER Women's Sevens – Division 2 tournament took place on 2 and 3 July 2011 in Riga, Latvia. Ukraine won the Division 2 championship with their victory over Switzerland in the Cup final, Czechia finished in third place.

== Teams ==
A total of 12 teams participated in the tournament. Following the promotion of Romania to the Top 12, Norway was promoted from Division 3 to replace them.

- Andorra
- Austria
- Belgium
- Bulgaria
- Croatia
- Czech Republic
- Israel
- Latvia
- Malta
- Norway
- Switzerland
- Ukraine

== Pool Stages ==
=== Group A ===
Nation	Won	Drawn	Lost	For	Against	Points
Switzerland	5	0	0	179	12	15
Czech Republic	4	0	1	91	29	13
Norway	3	0	2	91	29	11
Bulgaria	2	0	3	29	138	9
Andorra	1	0	4	22	103	7
Israel	0	0	5	21	102	5

2 July 2011

Czech Republic	19–0	Norway

2 July 2011

Andorra	5–17	Bulgaria

2 July 2011

Switzerland	30–0	Israel

2 July 2011

Bulgaria	0–31	Norway

2 July 2011

Czech Republic	10–7	Israel

2 July 2011

Switzerland	43–0	Andorra

2 July 2011

Israel	0–38	Norway

2 July 2011

Switzerland	62–0	Bulgaria

2 July 2011

Andorra	0–22	Czech Republic

2 July 2011

Bulgaria	12–7	Israel

2 July 2011

Andorra	5–14	Norway

2 July 2011

Switzerland	22–7	Czech Republic

3 July 2011

Andorra	12–7	Israel

3 July 2011

Czech Republic	33–0	Bulgaria

3 July 2011

Switzerland	22–5	Norway

=== Group B ===
Nation	Won	Drawn	Lost	For	Against	Points
Ukraine	5	0	0	212	7	15
Croatia	4	0	1	99	48	13
Belgium	3	0	2	55	76	11
Austria	2	0	3	60	86	9
Malta	1	0	4	12	137	7
Latvia	0	0	5	7	91	5

2 July 2011

Austria	36–7	Malta

2 July 2011

Latvia	0–10	Croatia

2 July 2011

Belgium	0–33	Ukraine

2 July 2011

Croatia	27–0	Malta

2 July 2011

Austria	0–31	Ukraine

2 July 2011

Belgium	14–7	Latvia

2 July 2011

Ukraine	55–0	Malta

2 July 2011

Belgium	5–24	Croatia

2 July 2011

Latvia	0–12	Austria

2 July 2011

Croatia	7–43	Ukraine

2 July 2011

Latvia	0–5	Malta

2 July 2011

Belgium	17–12	Austria

3 July 2011

Latvia	0–50	Ukraine

3 July 2011

Austria	0–31	Croatia

3 July 2011

Belgium	19–0	Malta

== Classification Stages ==
=== Bowl Semi-finals ===
Semi-finals
3 July 2011
Andorra	0
Latvia	14
3 July 2011
Israel	5
Malta	10

Bowl Final
3 July 2011
Latvia	14
Malta	0
11th Place
3 July 2011
Andorra	10
Israel	0

=== Plate Semi-finals ===
Semi-finals
3 July 2011
Norway	5
Austria	10
3 July 2011
Belgium	34
Bulgaria	0

Plate Final
3 July 2011Austria 10-5 Belgium
Austria	10
Belgium	5
7th Place
3 July 2011
Norway	25
Bulgaria	5

=== Cup Semi-finals ===
Semi-finals
3 July 2011
Switzerland	17
Croatia	0
3 July 2011
Czech Republic	0
Ukraine	47

Cup Final
3 July 2011
Ukraine	41
Switzerland	0
3rd Place
3 July 2011
Czech Republic	14
Croatia	7
