= 2012 FIRA-AER Women's Sevens – Emerging Nations =

International women's rugby sevens tournament

- Host nation: Hungary
- Date: 9 April 2012

Cup
- Champion: Romania
- Runner-up: Hungary
- Third: Poland

The 2012 FIRA-AER Women's Sevens – Emerging Nations tournament took place after a training camp which was held from 5 to 9 April. The tournament was held on 9 April 2012 at Zánka, Hungary. Romania won the competition with Hungary as runners-up and Poland in third place.

== Teams ==
Ten teams participated in the tournament.

- Austria
- Barbarians
- Bulgaria
- Croatia
- Czech Republic
- Hungary
- Poland
- Poland II
- Romania
- Slovakia

== Pool Stages ==
=== Group A ===
| Nation | Won | Drawn | Lost | For | Against |
|---|---|---|---|---|---|
| Romania | 3 | 0 | 1 | 138 | 17 |
| Bulgaria | 2 | 0 | 2 | 52 | 72 |
| Austria | 1 | 0 | 3 | 46 | 88 |
| Slovakia | 0 | 0 | 4 | 7 | 171 |
| Poland II (Note: As an additional team, Poland II were automatically placed 5th in the pool) | 4 | 0 | 0 | 106 | 5 |

9 April 2012

| Slovakia | 0–47 | Romania |

9 April 2012

| Austria | 5–12 | Bulgaria |

9 April 2012

| Romania | 0–17 | Poland II |

9 April 2012

| Austria | 36–0 | Slovakia |

9 April 2012

| Bulgaria | 0–21 | Poland II |

9 April 2012

| Romania | 52–0 | Austria |

9 April 2012

| Bulgaria | 40–7 | Slovakia |

9 April 2012

| Austria | 5–24 | Poland II |

9 April 2012

| Romania | 39–0 | Bulgaria |

9 April 2012

| Poland II | 44–0 | Slovakia |

=== Group B ===
| Nation | Won | Drawn | Lost | For | Against |
|---|---|---|---|---|---|
| Hungary | 4 | 0 | 0 | 140 | 28 |
| Poland | 3 | 0 | 1 | 127 | 26 |
| Croatia | 2 | 0 | 2 | 74 | 41 |
| Czech Republic | 1 | 0 | 3 | 55 | 112 |
| Barbarians | 0 | 0 | 4 | 0 | 189 |

9 April 2012

| Hungary | 47–14 | Czech Republic |

9 April 2012

| Croatia | 0–17 | Poland |

9 April 2012

| Czech Republic | 36–0 | Barbarians |

9 April 2012

| Croatia | 0–24 | Hungary |

9 April 2012

| Poland | 60–0 | Barbarians |

9 April 2012

| Czech Republic | 0–29 | Croatia |

9 April 2012

| Poland | 14–21 | Hungary |

9 April 2012

| Croatia | 45–0 | Barbarians |

9 April 2012

| Czech Republic | 5–36 | Poland |

9 April 2012

| Barbarians | 0–48 | Hungary |

== Classification Stages ==
=== 9th Place Playoff ===
9 April 2012

| Poland II | 43–0 | Barbarians |

=== 7th Place Playoff ===
9 April 2012

| Slovakia | 0–32 | Czech Republic |

=== 5th Place Playoff ===
9 April 2012

| Austria | 0–35 | Croatia |

=== 3rd Place Playoff ===
9 April 2012

| Bulgaria | 0–40 | Poland |

=== Final ===
9 April 2012

| Romania | 26–19 | Hungary |
