= 2010 FIRA-AER Women's Sevens – Division A =

International women's rugby sevens tournament

- Host nation: Romania
- Date: 22–23 May 2010

Cup
- Champion: Moldova
- Runner-up: Switzerland
- Third: Belgium

Tournament details
- Matches played: 42

The 2010 FIRA-AER Women's Sevens – Division A tournament was held on 22 and 23 May 2010 in Bucharest, Romania. Moldova won the competition and Switzerland were runners-up.

== Teams ==
Twelve teams participated in the tournament.

- Andorra
- Austria
- Belgium
- Bulgaria
- Croatia
- Czech Republic
- Israel
- Latvia
- Malta
- Moldova
- Romania
- Switzerland

== Pool Stages ==
=== Group A ===
Nation	Won	Drawn	Lost	For	Against	Points
Moldova	4	1	0	96	17	14
Belgium	4	1	0	84	7	14
Austria	3	0	2	48	59	11
Andorra	2	0	3	36	36	9
Croatia	1	0	4	35	49	7
Bulgaria	0	0	5	0	131	5

22 May 2010

Austria	12–5	Croatia

22 May 2010

Belgium	19–0	Andorra

22 May 2010

Moldova	40–0	Bulgaria

22 May 2010

Andorra	12–0	Croatia

22 May 2010

Austria	19–0	Bulgaria

22 May 2010

Moldova	7–7	Belgium

22 May 2010

Bulgaria	0–24	Croatia

22 May 2010

Moldova	5–0	Andorra

22 May 2010

Belgium	24–0	Austria

22 May 2010

Andorra	24–0	Bulgaria

22 May 2010

Belgium	10–0	Croatia

22 May 2010

Moldova	29–5	Austria

23 May 2010

Belgium	24–0	Bulgaria

23 May 2010

Austria	12–0	Andorra

23 May 2010

Moldova	15–5	Croatia

=== Group B ===
Nation	Won	Drawn	Lost	For	Against	Points
Switzerland	5	0	0	126	10	15
Romania	4	0	1	87	36	13
Czech Republic	3	0	2	39	74	11
Latvia	2	0	3	29	47	9
Malta	1	1	3	24	65	7
Israel	0	1	4	5	78	5

22 May 2010

Israel	0–31	Switzerland

22 May 2010

Malta	7–12	Romania

22 May 2010

Czech Republic	10–0	Latvia

22 May 2010

Romania	5–24	Switzerland

22 May 2010

Israel	0–10	Latvia

22 May 2010

Czech Republic	14–7	Malta

22 May 2010

Latvia	5–10	Switzerland

22 May 2010

Czech Republic	5–26	Romania

22 May 2010

Malta	5–5	Israel

22 May 2010

Romania	22–0	Latvia

22 May 2010

Malta	0–20	Switzerland

22 May 2010

Czech Republic	10–0	Israel

23 May 2010

Malta	5–14	Latvia

23 May 2010

Israel	0–22	Romania

23 May 2010

Czech Republic	0–36	Switzerland

== Classification Stages ==
=== Bowl Semi-finals ===
Semi-finals
23 May 2010
Croatia	10
Israel	0
23 May 2010
Bulgaria	17
Malta	12

Bowl Final
23 May 2010
Croatia	17
Bulgaria	0
11th Place
23 May 2010
Israel	15
Malta	5

=== Plate Semi-finals ===
Semi-finals
23 May 2010
Austria	0
Latvia	17
23 May 2010
Andorra	10
Czech Republic	5

Plate Final
23 May 2010
Latvia	7
Andorra	5
7th Place
23 May 2010
Czech Republic	10
Austria	7

=== Cup Semi-finals ===
Semi-finals
23 May 2010
Moldova	20
Romania	0
23 May 2010
Belgium	0
Switzerland	15

Cup Final
23 May 2010
Moldova	19
Switzerland	17
3rd Place
23 May 2010
Belgium	26
Romania	0
