= 2010 FIRA-AER Women's Sevens – Emerging Nations =

Women's rugby sevens tournament

- Host nation: Hungary
- Date: 4 April 2010

Cup
- Champion: Hungary
- Runner-up: Poland
- Third: Czech Republic

Tournament details
- Matches played: 25

The 2010 FIRA-AER Women's Sevens – Emerging Nations tournament was held on 4 April 2010 at Zanka, Hungary. Hungary won the competition after beating Poland in the final.

== Teams ==
Ten teams competed in the tournament.

- Austria
- Barbarians
- Czech Republic
- Denmark
- Finland
- Hungary
- Luxembourg
- (Croatia) Mladost Zagreb
- Poland
- Slovenia

== Pool Stages ==
=== Pool A ===
Nation	Won	Drawn	Lost	For	Against	Points
Hungary	4	0	0	90	20	8
Poland	3	0	1	66	31	6
Czech Republic	2	0	2	52	38	4
Austria	1	0	3	29	70	2
Finland	0	0	4	10	88	0

4 April 2010

Hungary	21–5	Finland

4 April 2010

Czech Republic	19–0	Austria

4 April 2010

Finland	0–27	Poland

4 April 2010

Poland	10–14	Hungary

4 April 2010

Austria	10–17	Poland

4 April 2010

Finland	0–26	Czech Republic

4 April 2010

Austria	5–29	Hungary

4 April 2010

Czech Republic	7–12	Poland

4 April 2010

Finland	5–14	Austria

4 April 2010

Czech Republic	0–26	Hungary

=== Pool B ===
Nation	Won	Drawn	Lost	For	Against	Points
(Croatia) Mladost Zagreb	4	0	0	77	20	8
Denmark	3	0	1	76	21	6
Luxembourg	2	0	2	58	60	4
Slovenia	1	0	3	61	84	2
Barbarians	0	0	4	5	92	0

4 April 2010

Barbarians	5–7	(Croatia) Mladost Zagreb

4 April 2010

Denmark	10–7	Luxembourg

4 April 2010

Mladost Zagreb (Croatia)	21–5	Slovenia

4 April 2010

Denmark	12–0	Barbarians

4 April 2010

Luxembourg	19–15	Slovenia

4 April 2010

Mladost Zagreb (Croatia)	14–10	Denmark

4 April 2010

Luxembourg	32–0	Barbarians

4 April 2010

Denmark	44–0	Slovenia

4 April 2010

Mladost Zagreb (Croatia)	35–0	Luxembourg

4 April 2010

Slovenia	41–0	Barbarians

== Classification Stage ==
9th place

4 April 2010

Slovenia	12–17	Barbarians

7th place

4 April 2010

Denmark	12–0	Luxembourg

5th place

4 April 2010

Finland	22–17	(Croatia) Mladost Zagreb

3rd place

4 April 2010

Czech Republic	17–12	Austria

Final

4 April 2010

Hungary	24–0	Poland
