= 2007 FIRA-AER Women's Sevens – Division A =

- Host nation: Croatia
- Date: 26–27 May 2007

Cup
- Champion: France U20
- Runner-up: Switzerland
- Third: Germany

Tournament details
- Matches played: 42

The 2007 FIRA-AER Women's Sevens – Division A was held at Zagreb, Croatia from 26 to 27 May 2007. The France U20 team won the tournament and Switzerland were runner-up.

== Teams ==
Twelve teams competed in the tournament.

- France U20
- Switzerland
- Belgium
- Romania
- Croatia
- Czech Republic
- Lithuania
- Germany
- Andorra
- Norway
- Bulgaria
- Poland

== Pool Stages ==
=== Pool A ===
Nation	Won	Drawn	Lost	For	Against	Points
France U20	5	0	0	146	10	15
Switzerland	4	0	1	106	51	13
Belgium	3	0	2	65	37	11
Romania	2	0	3	55	46	9
Croatia	1	0	4	14	142	7
Czech Republic	0	0	5	26	126	5

Switzerland	43–0	Croatia

Belgium	12–5	Romania

France U20	38–0	Czech Republic

Romania	26–0	Croatia

Switzerland	31–14	Czech Republic

France U20	17–5	Belgium

Czech Republic	12–14	Croatia

France U20	17–5	Romania

Belgium	10–15	Switzerland

Romania	19–0	Czech Republic

Belgium	14–0	Croatia

France U20	27–0	Switzerland

Belgium	24–0	Czech Republic

Switzerland	17–0	Romania

France U20	47–0	Croatia

=== Pool B ===
Nation	Won	Drawn	Lost	For	Against	Points
Lithuania	5	0	0	115	31	15
Germany	4	0	1	140	26	13
Andorra	3	0	2	70	58	11
Norway	2	0	3	71	59	9
Bulgaria	1	0	4	34	110	7
Poland	0	0	5	15	161	5

Norway	26–0	Bulgaria

Germany	29–7	Andorra

Lithuania	42–5	Poland

Andorra	22–5	Bulgaria

Norway	31–0	Poland

Lithuania	14–12	Germany

Poland	0–29	Bulgaria

Lithuania	12–7	Andorra

Germany	25–0	Norway

Andorra	19–5	Poland

Germany	34–0	Bulgaria

Lithuania	19–7	Norway

Germany	40–5	Poland

Norway	7–15	Andorra

Lithuania	28–0	Bulgaria

== Classification Stages ==
=== Cup Semi-finals ===
Semi-finals
France U20	40
Germany	0
Switzerland	20
Lithuania	0

Cup Final
France U20	46
Switzerland	0
3rd Place
Germany	22
Lithuania	5

=== Plate Semi-finals ===
Semi-finals
Belgium	17
Norway	0
Romania	5
Andorra	0

Plate Final
Belgium	10
Romania	5
7th Place
Norway	26
Andorra	0

=== Bowl Semi-finals ===
Semi-finals
Croatia	12
Poland	17
Czech Republic	38
Bulgaria	0

Bowl Final
Czech Republic	17
Poland	5
11th Place
Croatia	24
Bulgaria	0
