= 2009 FIRA-AER Women's Sevens – Division A =

International women's rugby sevens tournament

- Host nation: Belgium
- Date: 4–5 July 2009

Cup
- Champion: Finland
- Runner-up: Czech Republic
- Third: Malta

Tournament details
- Matches played: 42

The 2009 FIRA-AER Women's Sevens – Division A tournament was held from 4 to 5 July in Bruges, Belgium. Finland were crowned champions after their win over Czechia in the Cup final and were promoted to the FIRA-AER Women's Sevens Championship for 2010.

== Teams ==
Twelve teams competed in the tournament. Belgium B replaced Lithuania.

- Andorra
- Austria
- Belgium
- Belgium B
- Bulgaria
- Croatia
- Czech Republic
- Finland
- Israel
- Latvia
- Malta
- Romania

== Pool Stages ==
=== Group A ===
Nation	Won	Drawn	Lost	For	Against
Finland	5	0	0	125	5
Czech Republic	4	0	1	80	28
Israel	3	0	2	32	39
Belgium B	2	0	3	37	74
Latvia	0	1	4	22	61
Croatia	0	1	4	10	99

4 July 2009

Czech Republic	33–0	Belgium B

4 July 2009

Israel	10–7	Latvia

4 July 2009

Finland	43–0	Croatia

4 July 2009

Latvia	0–10	Belgium B

4 July 2009

Czech Republic	14–0	Croatia

4 July 2009

Finland	20–0	Israel

4 July 2009

Croatia	0–27	Belgium B

4 July 2009

Finland	10–5	Latvia

4 July 2009

Israel	0–12	Czech Republic

4 July 2009

Latvia	10–10	Croatia

4 July 2009

Israel	17–0	Belgium B

4 July 2009

Finland	28–0	Czech Republic

5 July 2009

Israel	5–0	Croatia

5 July 2009

Czech Republic	21–0	Latvia

5 July 2009

Finland	24–0	Belgium B

=== Group B ===
Nation	Won	Drawn	Lost	For	Against
Belgium	4	0	1	56	17
Malta	3	1	1	82	12
Romania	3	1	1	67	31
Austria	3	0	2	55	44
Andorra	1	0	4	19	70
Bulgaria	0	0	5	17	122

4 July 2009

Bulgaria	7–19	Austria

4 July 2009

Romania	5–5	Malta

4 July 2009

Andorra	0–5	Belgium

4 July 2009

Malta	5–7	Austria

4 July 2009

Bulgaria	0–24	Belgium

4 July 2009

Andorra	7–14	Romania

4 July 2009

Belgium	15–0	Austria

4 July 2009

Andorra	0–19	Malta

4 July 2009

Romania	31–0	Bulgaria

4 July 2009

Malta	17–0	Belgium

4 July 2009

Romania	17–7	Austria

4 July 2009

Andorra	12–10	Bulgaria

5 July 2009

Romania	0–12	Belgium

5 July 2009

Bulgaria	0–36	Malta

5 July 2009

Andorra	0–22	Austria

== Classification Stages ==
=== Bowl Semi-final ===
Semi-finals
Latvia	5
Bulgaria	17
Croatia	0
Andorra	19

Bowl Final
Andorra	7
Bulgaria	0
11th Place
Latvia	10
Croatia	0

=== Plate Semi-final ===
Semi-finals
Israel	0
Austria	17
Belgium B	10
Romania	0

Plate Final
Austria	24
Belgium B	10
7th Place
Israel	10
Romania	0

=== Cup Semi-final ===
Semi-finals
Finland	31
Malta	0
Czech Republic	19
Belgium	7

Cup Final
Finland	29
Czech Republic	0
3rd Place
Malta	14
Belgium	5
