= 2008 FIRA-AER Women's Sevens =

- Host nation: France
- Date: 14–15 June 2008

Cup
- Champion: England
- Runner-up: Netherlands
- Third: Russia

Tournament details
- Matches played: 48

The 2008 FIRA-AER Women's Sevens was the sixth edition of the European Women's Sevens Championship and was held in Limoges, France on 14 and 15 June 2008. This was the final qualifying tournament for Europe for the inaugural 2009 Women's Rugby World Cup Sevens in Dubai.

England, Netherlands, Russia, Spain, France and Italy were the teams that qualified for the World Cup.

== Teams ==
The 10 team format was replaced by 16 teams as it was the World Cup qualifier.

Nine teams who were confirmed (pre-qualified) were France, England, Spain, Wales, Italy, Netherlands, Sweden, Russia, and Portugal. Seven teams from the 2008 FIRA-AER Women's Sevens – Division A competition also qualified for the tournament.

- Andorra*
- Czech Republic*
- England
- Finland*
- France
- Germany*
- Israel*
- Italy
- Moldova*
- Netherlands
- Portugal
- Romania*
- Russia
- Spain
- Sweden
- Wales

Note: * indicates teams that qualified from the 2008 FIRA-AER Women's Sevens – Division A tournament. Czechia qualified in place of Scotland

== Pool Stages ==
=== Pool A ===
Nation	Won	Drawn	Lost	For	Against
Russia	3	0	0	76	10
France	2	0	1	103	17
Portugal	1	0	2	43	47
Czech Republic	0	0	3	5	153

14 June 2008

France	22–0	Portugal

14 June 2008

Russia	39–0	Czech Republic

14 June 2008

France	71–0	Czech Republic

14 June 2008

Russia	20–0	Portugal

14 June 2008

Portugal	43–5	Czech Republic

14 June 2008

France	10–17	Russia

=== Pool B ===
Nation	Won	Drawn	Lost	For	Against
England	3	0	0	127	0
Germany	2	0	1	78	48
Sweden	1	0	2	46	80
Andorra	0	0	3	14	137

14 June 2008

England	31–0	Germany

14 June 2008

Sweden	36–7	Andorra

14 June 2008

England	56–0	Andorra

14 June 2008

Sweden	10–33	Germany

14 June 2008

Germany	45–7	Andorra

14 June 2008

England	40–0	Sweden

=== Pool C ===
Nation	Won	Drawn	Lost	For	Against
Spain	3	0	0	114	24
Netherlands	2	0	1	106	28
Romania	1	0	2	39	71
Israel	0	0	3	0	136

14 June 2008

Spain	36–5	Romania

14 June 2008

Netherlands	52–0	Israel

14 June 2008

Spain	50–0	Israel

14 June 2008

Netherlands	35–0	Romania

14 June 2008

Romania	34–0	Israel

14 June 2008

Spain	28–19	Netherlands

=== Pool D ===
Nation	Won	Drawn	Lost	For	Against
Italy	3	0	0	110	5
Wales	2	0	1	76	38
Finland	1	0	2	17	93
Moldova	0	0	3	15	82

14 June 2008

Wales	40–0	Finland

14 June 2008

Italy	34–0	Moldova

14 June 2008

Wales	31–10	Moldova

14 June 2008

Italy	48–0	Finland

14 June 2008

Finland	17–5	Moldova

14 June 2008

Wales	5–28	Italy

== Classification Stages ==
=== Cup Quarter-finals ===
Quarter-finals
15 June 2008
Russia	20
Germany	5
15 June 2008
Netherlands	5
Italy	0
15 June 2008
Spain	14
Wales	5
15 June 2008
England	29
France	7

Semi-finals
15 June 2008
Netherlands	21
Russia	12
15 June 2008
England	10
Spain	0

Cup Final
15 June 2008
England	52
Netherlands	0
3rd Place
15 June 2008
Russia	10
Spain	5

=== Plate Semi-final ===
Semi-finals
15 June 2008
France	35
Wales	7
15 June 2008
Italy	29
Germany	0

Plate Final
15 June 2008
France	14
Italy	5
7th Place
15 June 2008
Wales	20
Germany	0

=== Bowl Quarter-finals ===
Quarter-finals
15 June 2008
Portugal	17
Andorra	0
15 June 2008
Finland	21
Israel	0
15 June 2008
Moldova	12
Romania	0
15 June 2008
Sweden	34
Czech Republic	0

Semi-finals
15 June 2008
Portugal	19
Finland	7
15 June 2008
Sweden	22
Moldova	5

Bowl Final
15 June 2008
Sweden	15
Portugal	7
11th Place
15 June 2008
Moldova	10
Finland	7

=== Shield Semi-final ===
Semi-finals
15 June 2008
Romania	19
Czech Republic	14
15 June 2008
Andorra	34
Israel	0

Shield Final
15 June 2008
Andorra	10
Romania	5
15th Place
15 June 2008
Israel	12
Czech Republic	7

== Final standings ==
Legend
Qualified for the 2009 Rugby World Cup Sevens

Rank	Team
1st place, gold medalist(s)	England
2nd place, silver medalist(s)	Netherlands
3rd place, bronze medalist(s)	Russia
4	Spain
5	France
6	Italy
7	Wales
8	Germany
9	Sweden
10	Portugal
11	Moldova
12	Finland
13	Andorra
14	Romania
15	Israel
16	Czech Republic
