= 2005 FIRA-AER Women's Sevens – Division A =

- Host nation: France
- Date: 25–26 June 2005

Cup
- Champion: England
- Runner-up: Spain
- Third: Netherlands

Tournament details
- Matches played: 29

The 2005 FIRA-AER Women's Sevens – Division A was the third edition of the European Women's Sevens Championship and was held in Lunel, France from 25 to 26 June 2005. England defeated Spain in the Cup final of the Championship event.

== Teams ==
Ten teams competed in the tournament.

- Belgium
- Croatia
- England
- France
- Italy
- Netherlands
- Portugal
- Spain
- Sweden
- Switzerland

== Pool Stages ==
=== Pool A ===
Nation	P	W	D	L	PF	PA	PD	Pts
England	4	4	0	0	115	7	+108	12
Spain	4	3	0	1	114	12	+102	10
Portugal	4	1	1	2	34	45	–11	7
Belgium	4	1	1	2	24	57	–33	7
Switzerland	4	0	0	4	5	131	–126	4

25 June 2005

Portugal	12–12	Belgium

Lunel, France

25 June 2005

England	54–0	Switzerland

Lunel, France

25 June 2005

Spain	40–0	Portugal

Lunel, France

25 June 2005

Belgium	12–0	Switzerland

Lunel, France

25 June 2005

England	12–7	Spain

Lunel, France

25 June 2005

Portugal	22–5	Switzerland

Lunel, France

25 June 2005

Spain	24–0	Belgium

Lunel, France

25 June 2005

England	28–0	Portugal

Lunel, France

26 June 2005

Spain	43–0	Switzerland

Lunel, France

26 June 2005

England	21–0	Belgium

Lunel, France

=== Pool B ===
Nation	P	W	D	L	PF	PA	PD	Pts
Netherlands	4	4	0	0	89	5	+84	12
Sweden	4	3	0	1	49	24	+25	10
France	4	2	0	2	53	14	+39	8
Italy	4	1	0	3	12	92	–80	6
Croatia	4	0	0	4	5	73	–68	4

25 June 2005

Netherlands	28–0	Croatia

Lunel, France

25 June 2005

Sweden	21–0	Italy

Lunel, France

25 June 2005

France	12–0	Croatia

Lunel, France

25 June 2005

Netherlands	19–0	Sweden

Lunel, France

25 June 2005

France	31–0	Italy

Lunel, France

25 June 2005

Sweden	21–0	Croatia

Lunel, France

25 June 2005

Netherlands	7–5	France

Lunel, France

25 June 2005

Italy	12–5	Croatia

Lunel, France

26 June 2005

Sweden	7–5	France

Lunel, France

26 June 2005

Netherlands	35–0	Italy

Lunel, France

== Classification Stages ==
=== Cup Semi-finals ===
Semi-finals
26 June 2005
Spain	28
Netherlands	5
26 June 2005
England	49
Sweden	0

Cup Final
26 June 2005
England	14
Spain	0
3rd Place
26 June 2005
Netherlands	21
Sweden	7

=== Plate Semi-finals ===
Semi-finals
26 June 2005
France	22
Portugal	0
26 June 2005
Italy	19
Belgium	7

Plate Final
26 June 2005
France	33
Italy	0
7th Place
26 June 2005
Portugal	35
Belgium	10

=== 9th Place Playoff ===
26 June 2005

Croatia	7–5	Switzerland

Lunel, France
