= 2023 Rugby Europe Women's Sevens Trophy =

- Hosts: Croatia; Hungary
- Date: 16 June–9 July 2023
- Nations: 12

Final positions
- Champions: Ukraine
- Runners-up: Turkey
- Third: Finland

Series details
- Matches played: 68

The 2023 Rugby Europe Women's Sevens Trophy is the second division of Rugby Europe's 2023 sevens season. This edition is hosted by the cities of Zagreb and Budapest on 16–18 June and 8–9 July. The two highest-placed teams will be promoted to the 2024 Championship series. The two teams with the fewest points will be relegated to the 2024 Conference.

== Schedule ==
Date	Venue	Stadium	Winner
16–18 June	Zagreb	Stadion Lučko	Ukraine
8–9 July	Budapest	Budapest Rugby Centre	Ukraine

== Standings ==
Legend
Promoted to 2024 Championship
Relegated to 2024 Conference

2023 Rugby Europe Women's Sevens Trophy
Pos	Event Team	Zagreb	Budapest	Points total
1st place, gold medalist(s)	Ukraine	20	20	40
2nd place, silver medalist(s)	Turkey	18	18	36
3rd place, bronze medalist(s)	Finland	16	14	30
4	Georgia	14	16	30
5	Hungary	8	12	20
6	Latvia	12	8	20
7	Austria	10	6	16
8	Denmark	4	10	14
9	Israel	6	3	9
10	Norway	2	4	6
11	Moldova	3	2	5
12	Bulgaria	1	1	2

== Zagreb ==
=== Pool stage ===
==== Pool A ====
Team	Pld	W	D	L	PF	PA	PD	Pts
Ukraine	3	3	0	0	87	12	75	9
Turkey	3	2	0	1	71	29	42	7
Denmark	3	1	0	2	17	58	-41	5
Moldova	3	0	0	3	12	88	-76	3

Denmark	17–5	Moldova

Turkey	12–22	Ukraine

Denmark	0–22	Ukraine

Turkey	28–7	Moldova

Moldova	0–43	Ukraine

Turkey	31–0	Denmark

==== Pool B ====
Team	Pld	W	D	L	PF	PA	PD	Pts
Finland	3	3	0	0	57	19	38	9
Latvia	3	2	0	1	39	38	1	7
Israel	3	1	0	2	29	60	-31	5
Norway	3	0	0	3	33	41	-8	3

Finland	24–0	Israel

Norway	7–10	Latvia

Finland	19–7	Latvia

Norway	14–17	Israel

Israel	12–22	Latvia

Norway	12–14	Finland

==== Pool C ====
Team	Pld	W	D	L	PF	PA	PD	Pts
Hungary	3	2	1	0	89	32	57	9
Georgia	3	2	1	0	67	29	38	7
Austria	3	1	0	2	49	36	13	5
Bulgaria	3	0	0	3	17	125	-108	3

Hungary	24–10	Austria

Georgia	43–7	Bulgaria

Hungary	48–5	Bulgaria

Georgia	7–5	Austria

Austria	34–5	Bulgaria

Georgia	17–17	Hungary

=== Knockout stage ===
==== 9th Place ====
Semi-finals
Denmark	39
Bulgaria	5
Norway	19
Moldova	22

Ninth place
Denmark	14
Moldova	7
Eleventh place
Bulgaria	0
Norway	38

==== 5th Place ====
Semi-finals
Israel	5
Latvia	17
Austria	21
Hungary	12

Fifth place
Latvia	19
Austria	0
Seventh place
Israel	0
Hungary	24

==== Cup ====
Quarter-finals
Ukraine	26
Israel	5
Latvia	5
Georgia	12
Finland	14
Austria	5
Hungary	5
Turkey	24

Semi-finals
Ukraine	28
Georgia	10
Finland	5
Turkey	26

Final
Ukraine	17
Turkey	5
Third place
Georgia	10
Finland	19

== Budapest ==
=== Pool stage ===
==== Pool A ====
Team	Pld	W	D	L	PF	PA	PD	Pts
Ukraine	3	3	0	0	133	22	111	9
Austria	3	2	0	1	48	58	-10	7
Hungary	3	1	0	2	76	57	19	5
Bulgaria	3	0	0	3	22	142	-120	3

July 7
09:58 UTC

Ukraine	59–12	Bulgaria

National Rugby Center, Budapest

July 7
10:20 UTC

Austria	19–12	Hungary

National Rugby Center, Budapest

July 7
12:58 UTC

Austria	29–5	Bulgaria

National Rugby Center, Budapest

July 7
13:20 UTC

Ukraine	33–10	Hungary

National Rugby Center, Budapest

July 7
15:58 UTC

Ukraine	41–0	Austria

National Rugby Center, Budapest

July 7
16:20 UTC

Hungary	54–5	Bulgaria

National Rugby Center, Budapest

==== Pool B ====
Team	Pld	W	D	L	PF	PA	PD	Pts
Turkey	3	3	0	0	85	17	68	9
Latvia	3	2	0	1	44	47	-3	7
Norway	3	1	0	2	37	53	-16	5
Israel	3	0	0	3	17	66	-49	3

July 7
09:14 UTC

Latvia	22–10	Israel

National Rugby Center, Budapest

July 7
09:36 UTC

Turkey	29–12	Norway

National Rugby Center, Budapest

July 7
12:14 UTC

Latvia	17–10	Norway

National Rugby Center, Budapest

July 7
12:36 UTC

Turkey	29–0	Israel

National Rugby Center, Budapest

July 7
15:14 UTC

Israel	7–15	Norway

National Rugby Center, Budapest

July 7
15:36 UTC

Turkey	27–5	Latvia

National Rugby Center, Budapest

==== Pool C ====
Team	Pld	W	D	L	PF	PA	PD	Pts
Finland	3	3	0	0	50	22	28	9
Georgia	3	2	0	1	42	17	25	7
Denmark	3	1	0	2	0	0	-2	5
Moldova	3	0	0	3	0	51	-51	3

July 7
08:30 UTC

Georgia	15–5	Denmark

National Rugby Center, Budapest

July 7
08:52 UTC

Finland	17–0	Moldova

National Rugby Center, Budapest

July 7
11:30 UTC

Georgia	17–0	Moldova

National Rugby Center, Budapest

July 7
11:52 UTC

Finland	21–12	Denmark

National Rugby Center, Budapest

July 7
14:30 UTC

Denmark	17–0	Moldova

National Rugby Center, Budapest

July 7
14:52 UTC

Finland	12–10	Georgia

National Rugby Center, Budapest

=== Knockout stage ===
==== 9th Place ====
Semi-finals
Norway	48
Bulgaria	5
Israel	24
Moldova	15

Ninth place
Norway	10
Israel	5
Eleventh place
Moldova	26
Bulgaria	10

==== 5th Place ====
Semi-finals
Denmark	20
Latvia	12
Hungary	19
Austria	12

Fifth place
Hungary	27
Denmark	5
Seventh place
Latvia	22
Austria	5

==== Cup ====
Quarter-finals
8 July – 09:15 UTC
Ukraine	36
Denmark	0
Latvia	5
Georgia	15
Turkey	24
Hungary	0
Finland	14
Austria	0

Semi-finals
Ukraine	33
Georgia	0
Turkey	17
Finland	0

Final
Ukraine	14
Turkey	7
Third place
Georgia	12
Finland	7
