= 2010 FIRA-AER Women's Sevens =

- Host nation: Russia
- Date: 10–11 July 2010

Cup
- Champion: Spain
- Runner-up: Netherlands
- Third: France

Tournament details
- Matches played: 29

The 2010 FIRA-AER Women's Sevens was the eighth edition of the European Women's Sevens Championship and was held on the 10 and 11 July 2010 in Moscow, Russia. Spain won their second title when they defeated the Netherlands in the Cup final.

== Teams ==
Ten teams participated in the tournament.

- England
- Finland
- France
- Germany
- Italy
- Netherlands
- Portugal
- Russia
- Spain
- Sweden

== Pool Stages ==
=== Group A ===
Nation	Won	Drawn	Lost	For	Against	Points
France	3	1	0	78	34	11
Italy	3	1	0	77	19	11
England	2	0	2	102	34	8
Germany	1	0	3	40	110	6
Sweden	0	0	4	17	117	4

10 July 2010

Sweden	5–29	England

10 July 2010

Germany	7–35	France

10 July 2010

England	7–17	Italy

10 July 2010

Germany	26–0	Sweden

10 July 2010

France	5–5	Italy

10 July 2010

England	56–0	Germany

10 July 2010

France	26–12	Sweden

10 July 2010

Germany	7–19	Italy

11 July 2010

England	10–12	France

11 July 2010

Italy	36–0	Sweden

=== Group B ===
Nation	Won	Drawn	Lost	For	Against	Points
Spain	4	0	0	116	12	12
Netherlands	3	0	1	71	46	10
Russia	1	1	2	48	49	7
Portugal	1	1	2	45	55	7
Finland	0	0	4	12	130	3

10 July 2010

Finland	0–47	Spain

10 July 2010

Netherlands	17–12	Portugal

10 July 2010

Spain	21–0	Russia

10 July 2010

Netherlands	33–5	Finland

10 July 2010

Portugal	7–7	Russia

10 July 2010

Spain	24–0	Netherlands

10 July 2010

Portugal	14–7	Finland

10 July 2010

Netherlands	21–5	Russia

11 July 2010

Spain	24–12	Portugal

11 July 2010

Russia	36–0	Finland

== Classification Stages ==
=== Bowl Final ===
Bowl Final
11 July 2010
Switzerland	24
Finland	17

=== Plate Semi-finals ===
Semi-finals
11 July 2010
England	12
Portugal	7
11 July 2010
Germany	7
Russia	12

Plate Final
11 July 2010 (AET)
England	13
Russia	10
7th Place
11 July 2010
Portugal	33
Germany	7

=== Cup Semi-finals ===
Semi-finals
11 July 2010
Italy	15
Netherlands	21
11 July 2010
France	0
Spain	21

Cup Final
11 July 2010
Spain	28
Netherlands	12
3rd Place
11 July 2010
France	12
Italy	0
