= 2009 FIRA-AER Women's Sevens =

- Host nation: Germany
- Date: 11–12 July 2009

Cup
- Champion: England
- Runner-up: Spain
- Third: Netherlands

Tournament details
- Matches played: 29

The 2009 FIRA-AER Women's Sevens was the seventh edition of the FIRA-AER Sevens and was held from 11 to 12 July in Hanover, Germany. England went undefeated throughout the tournament to claim their fourth title. Moldova were relegated to Division A for 2010.

== Teams ==
Ten teams competed in the tournament. Germany and Moldova were promoted from the 2008 FIRA-AER Women's Sevens – Division A competition.

- England
- France
- Germany
- Italy
- Moldova
- Netherlands
- Portugal
- Russia
- Spain
- Sweden

== Pool Stages ==
=== Pool A ===
Nation	Won	Drawn	Lost	For	Against
England	4	0	0	87	5
Spain	3	0	1	43	24
France	1	1	2	57	60
Portugal	1	1	2	36	63
Sweden	0	0	4	17	88

11 July 2009

Portugal	0–34	England

11 July 2009

Spain	14–0	France

11 July 2009

England	7–0	Sweden

11 July 2009

Spain	12–0	Portugal

11 July 2009

France	40–12	Sweden

11 July 2009

England	24–0	Spain

11 July 2009

France	12–12	Portugal

11 July 2009

Spain	17–0	Sweden

12 July 2009

England	22–5	France

12 July 2009

Sweden	5–24	Portugal

=== Pool B ===
Nation	Won	Drawn	Lost	For	Against
Netherlands	4	0	0	111	19
Germany	3	0	1	50	36
Russia	2	0	2	56	48
Italy	1	0	3	29	61
Moldova	0	0	4	7	89

11 July 2009

Moldova	0–26	Netherlands

11 July 2009

Russia	12–5	Italy

11 July 2009

Netherlands	19–0	Germany

11 July 2009

Russia	22–0	Moldova

11 July 2009

Italy	0–14	Germany

11 July 2009

Netherlands	31–12	Russia

11 July 2009

Italy	17–0	Moldova

11 July 2009

Russia	10–12	Germany

12 July 2009

Netherlands	35–7	Italy

12 July 2009

Germany	24–7	Moldova

== Classification Stages ==
=== Cup Semi-final ===
Semi-finals
12 July 2009
England	44
Germany	0
12 July 2009
Spain	12
Netherlands	7

Cup Final
12 July 2009
England	20
Spain	12
3rd Place
12 July 2009
Netherlands	35
Germany	10

=== Plate Semi-final ===
Semi-finals
12 July 2009
France	21
Italy	10
12 July 2009
Portugal	17
Russia	7

Plate Final
12 July 2009
France	19
Portugal	0
7th Place
12 July 2009
Russia	26
Italy	7

=== Bowl Final ===
Bowl Final
12 July 2009
Sweden	27
Moldova	7
