= Italy women's national rugby sevens team =

Italy
- Union: Italian Rugby Federation
- Coach: Andrea Di Giandomenico
Team kit	Change kit

World Cup Sevens
- Appearances: 1 (First in 2009)
- Best result: 11th (2009)

The Italy women's national rugby union sevens team is a Rugby sevens national women's side that represents Italy. They have only qualified once to the Rugby World Cup Sevens. At the 2021 Rugby Europe Women's Sevens Championship Series held in Lisbon and Moscow, Spain finished third overall.

== Tournament History ==
=== Rugby World Cup Sevens ===
Rugby World Cup Sevens
Year	Round	Position	Pld	W	L	D
(United Arab Emirates) 2009	Bowl Semifinalists	11th	5	2	3	0
(Russia) 2013	Did not qualify					
(United States) 2018	Did not qualify					
Total	0 Titles	1/3	5	2	3	0

=== Women's Sevens Grand Prix ===
Grand Prix record
Year	Round	Position
(France) 2003	Did not compete	
(France) 2004	Finalists	2nd
(France) 2005	Plate Finalists	6th
(France) 2006	9th Place Finalists	10th
(France) 2007	6th Place Finalists	6th
(France) 2008	Plate Finalists	6th
(Germany) 2009	Plate Semifinalists	7th
(Russia) 2010	Semifinalists	4th
(Romania) 2011	Plate Semifinalists	8th
(France) (Russia) 2012	Eighth Place	8th
(France) (Spain) 2013	Sixth Place	6th
(Russia) (France) 2014	Seventh Place	7th
(Russia) (France) 2015	Eighth Place	8th
(Russia) (France) 2016	Seventh Place	7th
(France) (Russia) 2017	Ninth Place	9th

== Current squad ==
- Sara Barattin
- Lucia Cammarano
- Maria Grazia Cioffi
- Marta Ferrari
- Manuela Furlan
- Miriam Keller
- Cristina Molic
- Michela Sillari
- Sofia Stefan
- Claudia Tedeschi
- Maria Diletta Veronese
- Cecilia Zublena
- Bianca Coltellini
