= 2011 FIRA-AER Women's Sevens =

Rugby competition

- Host nation: Romania
- Date: 16–17 July 2011

Cup
- Champion: England
- Runner-up: Spain
- Third: Netherlands

Tournament details
- Matches played: 42

The 2011 FIRA-AER Women's Sevens was the ninth edition of the European Women's Sevens Championship and was held on 16 and 17 July 2011 in Bucharest, Romania. England were crowned champions after they beat Spain in the Cup final.

== Teams ==
12 teams participated in the tournament. Wales originally entered, but withdrew on 2 March. As a result, Romania moved up from Division 2.

- England
- Finland
- France
- Germany
- Italy
- Moldova
- Netherlands
- Portugal
- Romania
- Russia
- Spain
- Switzerland

== Pool Stages ==
=== Group A ===
Nation	Won	Drawn	Lost	For	Against	Points
England	5	0	0	134	24	15
Spain	4	0	1	160	20	13
Italy	3	0	2	83	65	11
Germany	2	0	3	87	119	9
Switzerland	1	0	4	56	117	7
Romania	0	0	5	21	196	5

16 July 2011

England	46–0	Romania

16 July 2011

Italy	27–12	Germany

16 July 2011

Spain	42–0	Sweden

16 July 2011

Germany	37–0	Romania

16 July 2011

England	20–5	Sweden

16 July 2011

Spain	21–5	Italy

16 July 2011

Sweden	29–14	Romania

16 July 2011

Spain	42–0	Germany

16 July 2011

Italy	7–20	England

16 July 2011

Germany	31–17	Sweden

16 July 2011

Italy	34–7	Romania

16 July 2011

Spain	5–15	England

17 July 2011

Italy	10–5	Sweden

17 July 2011

England	33–7	Germany

17 July 2011

Spain	50–0	Romania

=== Group B ===
Nation	Won	Drawn	Lost	For	Against	Points
Russia	5	0	0	123	17	15
Netherlands	4	0	1	117	34	13
Portugal	3	0	2	75	24	11
France	2	0	3	94	57	9
Moldova	1	0	4	19	118	7
Finland	0	0	5	17	164	5

16 July 2011

Russia	41–0	Finland

16 July 2011

France	5–12	Portugal

16 July 2011

Netherlands	47–0	Moldova

16 July 2011

Portugal	27–0	Finland

16 July 2011

Russia	34–0	Moldova

16 July 2011

Netherlands	14–12	France

16 July 2011

Moldova	19–10	Finland

16 July 2011

Netherlands	12–5	Portugal

16 July 2011

France	7–24	Russia

16 July 2011

Portugal	31–0	Moldova

16 July 2011

France	43–7	Finland

16 July 2011

Netherlands	10–17	Russia

17 July 2011

France	27–0	Moldova

17 July 2011

Russia	7–0	Portugal

17 July 2011

Netherlands	34–0	Finland

== Classification Stages ==
=== Bowl Semi-finals ===
Semi-finals
17 July 2011
Sweden	24
Finland	5
17 July 2011
Moldova	10
Romania	7

Bowl Final
17 July 2011
Sweden	15
Moldova	12
11th Place
17 July 2011
Romania	40
Finland	10

=== Plate Semi-finals ===
Semi-finals
17 July 2011
Italy	7
France	14
17 July 2011
Portugal	28
Germany	10

Plate Final
17 July 2011
France	17
Portugal	7
7th Place
17 July 2011
Germany	14
Italy	12

=== Cup Semi-finals ===
Semi-finals
17 July 2011
England	14
Netherlands	0
17 July 2011
Russia	0
Spain	31

Cup Final
17 July 2011
England	17
Spain	7
3rd Place
17 July 2011
Netherlands	12
Russia	0
