= 2006 FIRA-AER Women's Sevens – Division A =

- Host nation: France

Cup
- Date: 25–27 May 2006
- Champion: Wales
- Runner-up: England
- Third: Netherlands

Tournament details
- Matches played: 48

The 2006 FIRA-AER Women's Sevens – Division A was the fourth edition of the European Women's Sevens Championship. The tournament was held in Limoges, France from 25 to 27 May 2006. Wales were crowned champions of the competition after beating England in the Cup final.

== Teams ==
16 teams competed in the tournament.

- Belgium
- Czech Republic
- England
- France
- Germany
- Ireland
- Italy
- Lithuania
- Netherlands
- Norway
- Portugal
- Russia
- Spain
- Sweden
- Switzerland
- Wales

== Pool Games ==
=== Pool One ===
Nation	Won	Drawn	Lost	For	Against	Points
England	3	0	0	95	0	9
Wales	2	0	1	52	7	7
Germany	1	0	2	24	61	5
Switzerland	0	0	3	0	103	3

25 May 2006

England	41–0	Germany

Limoges, France

25 May 2006

Wales	32–0	Switzerland

Limoges, France

25 May 2006

England	47–0	Switzerland

Limoges, France

25 May 2006

Wales	20–0	Germany

Limoges, France

26 May 2006

Germany	24–0	Switzerland

Limoges, France

26 May 2006

England	7–0	Wales

Limoges, France

=== Pool Two ===
Nation	Won	Drawn	Lost	For	Against	Points
Spain	3	0	0	81	0	9
Portugal	2	0	1	29	12	7
Italy	1	0	2	19	48	5
Czech Republic	0	0	3	0	69	3

25 May 2006

Spain	12–0	Portugal

Limoges, France

25 May 2006

Italy	19–0	Czech Republic

Limoges, France

25 May 2006

Spain	33–0	Czech Republic

Limoges, France

25 May 2006

Italy	0–12	Portugal

Limoges, France

26 May 2006

Portugal	17–0	Czech Republic

Limoges, France

26 May 2006

Spain	36–0	Italy

Limoges, France

=== Pool Three ===
Nation	Won	Drawn	Lost	For	Against	Points
Netherlands	3	0	0	83	5	9
France	2	0	1	55	21	7
Lithuania	1	0	2	35	51	5
Belgium	0	0	3	0	96	3

25 May 2006

Netherlands	29–0	Lithuania

Limoges, France

25 May 2006

France	28–0	Belgium

Limoges, France

25 May 2006

Netherlands	33–0	Belgium

Limoges, France

25 May 2006

France	22–0	Lithuania

Limoges, France

26 May 2006

Lithuania	35–0	Belgium

Limoges, France

26 May 2006

Netherlands	21–5	France

Limoges, France

=== Pool Four ===
Nation	Won	Drawn	Lost	For	Against	Points
Ireland	3	0	0	49	0	9
Sweden	2	0	1	53	5	7
Russia	1	0	2	22	39	5
Norway	0	0	3	0	80	3

25 May 2006

Sweden	31–0	Norway

Limoges, France

25 May 2006

Russia	0–17	Ireland

Limoges, France

25 May 2006

Sweden	0–5	Ireland

Limoges, France

25 May 2006

Russia	22–0	Norway

Limoges, France

26 May 2006

Norway	0–27	Ireland

Limoges, France

26 May 2006

Sweden	22–0	Russia

Limoges, France

== Classification Stages ==
=== Cup Quarter-finals ===
Quarter-finals
26 May 2006
England	22
Portugal	0
26 May 2006
Ireland	15
France	5
26 May 2006
Netherlands	17
Sweden	12
26 May 2006
Spain	3
Wales	10

Semi-finals
27 May 2006
England	21
Ireland	0
27 May 2006
Netherlands	0
Wales	29

Cup Final
27 May 2006
Wales	10
England	7
3rd Place
27 May 2006
Netherlands	10
Ireland	0

=== Plate Semi-finals ===
Semi-finals
27 May 2006
Sweden	5
Spain	17
27 May 2006
France	19
Portugal	0

Plate Final
27 May 2006
Spain	7
France	0
7th Place
27 May 2006
Sweden	41
Portugal	0

=== Bowl Quarter-finals ===
Quarter-finals
26 May 2006
Germany	35
Czech Republic	0
26 May 2006
Russia	24
Belgium	0
26 May 2006
Lithuania	12
Norway	0
26 May 2006
Italy	19
Switzerland	0

Semi-finals
27 May 2006
Germany	0
Russia	28
27 May 2006
Lithuania	7
Italy	27

Bowl Final
27 May 2006
Russia	29
Italy	0
11th Place
27 May 2006
Germany	26
Lithuania	7

=== Shield Semi-finals ===
Semi-finals
27 May 2006
Belgium	41
Czech Republic	0
27 May 2006
Norway	17
Switzerland	0

Shield Final
27 May 2006
Belgium	22
Norway	5
15th Place
27 May 2006
Switzerland	17
Czech Republic	12
