= 2003 FIRA-AER Women's Sevens =

- Host nation: France
- Date: 23–24 May 2003

Cup
- Champion: Spain
- Runner-up: France

Plate
- Winner: Portugal
- Runner-up: Belgium

Bowl
- Winner: Czech Republic
- Runner-up: Bulgaria

The 2003 FIRA-AER Women's Sevens is the first edition of the European Women's Sevens Championship. It took place on 24 May 2003 at Lunel.

Spain took home the first European Women's Sevens Championship after defeating France 21–12 in the Cup final.

== Pool Stage ==
Key to colours in group tables
| Teams that advanced to the Cup Semifinal |
| Teams advanced to the Plate Semifinal |
| Teams advanced to the Shield Final |

=== Pool A ===
| Teams | Pld | W | D | L | PF | PA | +/− | Pts |
|---|---|---|---|---|---|---|---|---|
| Spain | 4 | 4 | 0 | 0 | 162 | 5 | +157 | 12 |
| Switzerland | 4 | 3 | 0 | 1 | 131 | 24 | +107 | 10 |
| Belgium | 4 | 2 | 0 | 2 | 31 | 79 | -48 | 8 |
| Norway | 4 | 1 | 0 | 3 | 12 | 112 | -100 | 6 |
| Czech Republic | 4 | 0 | 0 | 4 | 5 | 121 | -116 | 4 |

| Switzerland | 47–0 | Czech Republic |

| Spain | 45–0 | Belgium |

| Norway | 7–0 | Czech Republic |

| Switzerland | 29–0 | Belgium |

| Spain | 50–0 | Norway |

| Belgium | 19–5 | Czech Republic |

| Switzerland | 50–5 | Norway |

| Spain | 48–0 | Czech Republic |

| Belgium | 12–0 | Norway |

| Spain | 19–5 | Switzerland |

=== Pool B ===
| Teams | Pld | W | D | L | PF | PA | +/− | Pts |
|---|---|---|---|---|---|---|---|---|
| France | 4 | 4 | 0 | 0 | 165 | 5 | +160 | 12 |
| Sweden | 4 | 3 | 0 | 1 | 68 | 50 | +18 | 10 |
| Portugal | 4 | 2 | 0 | 2 | 90 | 39 | +51 | 8 |
| Croatia | 4 | 1 | 0 | 3 | 24 | 129 | -105 | 6 |
| Bulgaria | 4 | 0 | 0 | 4 | 5 | 129 | -124 | 4 |

| Croatia | 19–5 | Bulgaria |

| France | 22–0 | Portugal |

| Sweden | 32–0 | Croatia |

| Portugal | 40–0 | Bulgaria |

| France | 40–5 | Sweden |

| Portugal | 40–5 | Croatia |

| Sweden | 19–0 | Bulgaria |

| France | 52–0 | Croatia |

| Sweden | 12–10 | Portugal |

| France | 51–0 | Bulgaria |

== Knockout stage ==
=== Bowl ===
24 May

| Czech Republic | 24–0 | Bulgaria |

=== Plate ===
Semi-finals
24 May
Portugal | 26
Norway | 5
24 May
Belgium | 7
Croatia | 0

Final
24 May
Portugal | 14
Belgium | 0
Third place
24 May
Norway | 5
Croatia | 7

=== Cup ===
Semi-finals
24 May
Spain | 49
Sweden | 0
24 May
France | 35
Switzerland | 0

Final
24 May
Spain | 21
France | 12
Third place
24 May
Sweden | 0
Switzerland | 5
