= 2021 Rugby Europe Women's Sevens Conference =

- Hosts: Serbia
- Date: 4-6 June 2021
- Nations: 9

Final positions
- Champions: Israel
- Runners-up: Austria
- Third: Croatia

Series details
- Matches played: 27

The 2021 Rugby Europe Women's Sevens Conference was held in Belgrade from 4 to 6 June 2021, the tournament was a multi-pool phase competition. It was played in three phases, with the final ranking after pool phase 3. Israel won the tournament and Monaco made their international debut.

== Teams ==
- Israel
- Luxembourg
- Austria
- Bulgaria
- Latvia
- Monaco
- Lithuania
- Croatia
- Andorra

== Standings ==
Rank	Team
1st place, gold medalist(s)	Israel
2nd place, silver medalist(s)	Austria
3rd place, bronze medalist(s)	Croatia
4	Latvia
5	Andorra
6	Bulgaria
7	Luxembourg
8	Lithuania
9	Monaco

== Tournament ==
=== Pool Phase 1 ===
==== Pool A ====
Team	Pld	W	D	L	PD	Pts
Israel	2	2	0	0	59	6
Luxembourg	2	1	0	1	-9	4
Lithuania	2	0	0	2	-50	2

4 June 2021

Israel	29–5; Report	Luxembourg

King Peter 1 Stadium, Belgrade, Serbia

4 June 2021

Lithuania	12–27; Report	Luxembourg

King Peter 1 Stadium

4 June 2021

Israel	35–0; Report	Lithuania

King Peter 1 Stadium

==== Pool B ====
Team	Pld	W	D	L	PD	Pts
Croatia	2	2	0	0	8	6
Austria	2	1	0	1	20	4
Bulgaria	2	0	0	2	-28	2

4 June 2021

Austria	25–0; Report	Bulgaria

King Peter 1 Stadium

4 June 2021

Croatia	17–14; Report	Bulgaria

King Peter 1 Stadium

5 June 2021

Austria	12–17; Report	Croatia

King Peter 1 Stadium

==== Pool C ====
Team	Pld	W	D	L	PD	Pts
Andorra	2	1	0	1	13	4
Monaco	2	1	0	1	-5	4
Latvia	2	1	0	1	-8	3

4 June 2021

Latvia	0–28; Report	Monaco

King Peter 1 Stadium

4 June 2021

Andorra	33–0; Report	Monaco

King Peter 1 Stadium

5 June 2021

Latvia	20–0; Report	Andorra

King Peter 1 Stadium

=== Pool Phase 2 ===
==== Pool D ====
Team	Pld	W	D	L	PD	Pts
Israel	2	1	0	1	90	6
Bulgaria	2	1	0	1	-27	4
Monaco	2	0	0	2	-63	2

5 June 2021

Israel	48–0; Report	Bulgaria

King Peter 1 Stadium

5 June 2021

Monaco	5–26; Report	Bulgaria

King Peter 1 Stadium

5 June 2021

Israel	42–0; Report	Monaco

King Peter 1 Stadium

==== Pool E ====
Team	Pld	W	D	L	PD	Pts
Latvia	2	2	0	0	62	6
Croatia	2	1	0	1	-14	4
Luxembourg	2	0	0	2	-48	2

5 June 2021

Croatia	0–26; Report	Latvia

King Peter 1 Stadium

5 June 2021

Luxembourg	5–41; Report	Latvia

King Peter 1 Stadium

5 June 2021

Croatia	19–7; Report	Luxembourg

King Peter 1 Stadium

==== Pool F ====
Team	Pld	W	D	L	PD	Pts
Austria	2	2	0	0	83	6
Andorra	2	1	0	1	-19	4
Lithuania	2	0	0	2	-64	2

5 June 2021

Andorra	20–0	Lithuania

King Peter 1 Stadium

5 June 2021

Austria	44–0; Report	Lithuania

King Peter 1 Stadium

5 June 2021

Andorra	0–39; Report	Austria

King Peter 1 Stadium

=== Pool Phase 3 ===
==== Pool G ====
Team	Pld	W	D	L	PD	Pts
Israel	2	2	0	0	33	6
Austria	2	1	0	1	23	4
Croatia	2	0	0	2	-56	2

6 June 2021

Israel	29–0; Report	Croatia

King Peter 1 Stadium

6 June 2021

Austria	27–0; Report	Croatia

King Peter 1 Stadium

6 June 2021

Israel	14–10; Report	Austria

King Peter 1 Stadium

==== Pool H ====
Team	Pld	W	D	L	PD	Pts
Latvia	2	2	0	0	40	6
Andorra	2	1	0	1	6	4
Bulgaria	2	0	0	2	-50	2

5 June 2021

Latvia	33–10; Report	Bulgaria

King Peter 1 Stadium

6 June 2021

Andorra	20–7; Report	Bulgaria

King Peter 1 Stadium

6 June 2021

Latvia	17–10; Report	Andorra

King Peter 1 Stadium

==== Pool I ====
Team	Pld	W	D	L	PD	Pts
Luxembourg	2	2	0	0	12	6
Lithuania	2	1	0	1	20	4
Monaco	2	0	0	2	-32	2

5 June 2021

Luxembourg	22–17; Report	Lithuania

King Peter 1 Stadium

6 June 2021

Monaco	5–32; Report	Lithuania

King Peter 1 Stadium

6 June 2021

Luxembourg	7–0; Report	Monaco

King Peter 1 Stadium
