= 2013 FIRA-AER Women's Sevens Grand Prix Series =

Women's Sevens Championship

- Hosts: France; Spain
- Date: 1–15 June 2013

Final positions
- Champions: Russia
- Runners-up: England
- Third: France

The 2013 FIRA-AER Women's Sevens Grand Prix Series was the eleventh edition of the European Women's Sevens Championship.

== European Championship: Top 12, Round 1 ==
Date/Venue: June 1–2, 2013 at Brive, France.

Group A

| Nation | Won | Drawn | Lost | For | Against |
|---|---|---|---|---|---|
| England | 5 | 0 | 0 | 148 | 15 |
| Russia | 4 | 0 | 1 | 90 | 17 |
| Netherlands | 3 | 0 | 2 | 117 | 55 |
| Germany | 1 | 0 | 4 | 40 | 102 |
| Portugal | 1 | 0 | 4 | 27 | 103 |
| Wales | 1 | 0 | 4 | 34 | 150 |

- Netherlands 31-0 Wales
- Russia 19-3 Portugal
- England 34-0 Germany
- Portugal 12-17 Wales
- Netherlands 29-7 Germany
- England 7-5 Russia
- Germany 26-17 Wales
- England 34-0 Portugal
- Russia 17-7 Netherlands
- Portugal 12-7 Germany
- Russia 39-0 Wales
- England 31-10 Netherlands
- Russia 10-0 Germany
- Netherlands 26-0 Portugal
- England 42-0 Wales

Group B

| Nation | Won | Drawn | Lost | For | Against |
|---|---|---|---|---|---|
| France | 5 | 0 | 0 | 148 | 10 |
| Spain | 4 | 0 | 1 | 99 | 39 |
| Ireland | 4 | 0 | 1 | 85 | 48 |
| Italy | 2 | 0 | 3 | 58 | 96 |
| Ukraine | 1 | 0 | 4 | 44 | 84 |
| Scotland | 0 | 0 | 5 | 10 | 167 |

- Ukraine 27-0 Scotland
- France 24-0 Italy
- Spain 14-10 Ireland
- Italy 38-5 Scotland
- Ukraine 7-17 Ireland
- Spain 0-24 France
- Ireland 24-0 Scotland
- Spain 33-0 Italy
- France 45-0 Ukraine
- Italy 10-29 Ireland
- France 38-5 Scotland
- Spain 12-5 Ukraine
- France 17-5 Ireland
- Ukraine 5-10 Italy
- Spain 40-0 Scotland

Bowl
Semi-finals

- Portugal 26-5 Scotland
- Wales 36-0 Ukraine

11th Place

- Scotland 0-19 Ukraine

Bowl final

- Portugal 17-7 Wales

Plate
Semi-finals

- Netherlands 29-0 Italy
- Germany 14-33 Ireland

7th Place

- Italy 24-0 Germany

Plate final

- Netherlands 7-12 Ireland

Cup
Semi-finals

- England 26-0 Spain
- Russia 12-10 France

3rd Place

- Spain 35-5 France

Cup final

- England 30-7 Russia

== European Championship: Top 12, Round 2 ==
Date/Venue: June 14–15, 2013 at Marbella, Spain.

Group A

| Nation | Won | Drawn | Lost | For | Against |
|---|---|---|---|---|---|
| France | 5 | 0 | 0 | 116 | 10 |
| Ireland | 4 | 0 | 1 | 98 | 27 |
| England | 3 | 0 | 2 | 88 | 50 |
| Portugal | 1 | 1 | 3 | 27 | 67 |
| Germany | 1 | 0 | 4 | 34 | 123 |
| Scotland | 0 | 1 | 4 | 43 | 129 |

- Ireland 31-5 Scotland
- France 28-0 Germany
- England 17-0 Portugal
- Germany 22-19 Scotland
- Ireland 19-0 Portugal
- England 0-26 France
- Portugal 12-12 Scotland
- England 40-0 Germany
- France 10-7 Ireland
- Germany 0-12 Portugal
- France 33-0 Scotland
- England 17-0 Ireland
- France 19-3 Portugal
- Ireland 24-12 Germany
- England 31-7 Scotland

Group B

| Nation | Won | Drawn | Lost | For | Against |
|---|---|---|---|---|---|
| Russia | 5 | 0 | 0 | 159 | 24 |
| Spain | 4 | 0 | 1 | 121 | 26 |
| Italy | 3 | 0 | 2 | 63 | 80 |
| Wales | 2 | 0 | 3 | 40 | 87 |
| Netherlands | 1 | 0 | 4 | 34 | 102 |
| Ukraine | 0 | 0 | 5 | 14 | 112 |

- Netherlands 12-7 Ukraine
- Spain 33-7 Italy
- Russia 41-0 Wales
- Italy 22-7 Ukraine
- Netherlands 17-21 Wales
- Russia 19-12 Spain
- Wales 12-0 Ukraine
- Russia 28-12 Italy
- Spain 33-0 Netherlands
- Italy 10-7 Wales
- Spain 24-0 Ukraine
- Russia 29-0 Netherlands
- Spain 19-0 Wales
- Netherlands 5-12 Italy
- Russia 42-0 Ukraine

Bowl
Semi-finals

- Germany 0-24 Ukraine
- Scotland 0-43 Netherlands

11th-place play-off

- Germany 31-3 Scotland

Bowl final

- Ukraine 12-31 Netherlands

Plate
Semi-finals

- England 19-14 Wales
- Portugal 5-14 Italy

7th-place play-off

- Wales 17-14 Portugal

Plate final

- England 19-12 Italy

Cup
Semi-finals

- France 12-5 Spain
- Ireland 5-27 Russia

3rd-place play-off

- Spain 14-7 Ireland

Cup final

- France 12-29 Russia

== Finals positions ==
| Rank | Team | Points |
|---|---|---|
| 1 | Russia | 38 |
| 2 | England | 32 |
| 3 | France | 32 |
| 4 | Spain | 32 |
| 5 | Ireland | 26 |
| 6 | Italy | 18 |
| 7 | Netherlands | 14 |
| 8 | Wales | 11 |
| 9 | Portugal | 10 |
| 10 | Germany | 8 |
| 11 | Ukraine | 5 |
| 12 | Scotland | 2 |
