= Israel women's national rugby sevens team =

Israel
- Union: Rugby Israel

World Cup Sevens
- Appearances: 0

The Israel women's national rugby sevens team represents Israel in rugby sevens. They compete in the Rugby Europe Women's Sevens regularly. Israel won the 2021 Rugby Europe Women's Sevens Conference in Belgrade.

== History ==
The Israeli women's national sevens team was formed in 2005 and have competed in the Rugby Europe Women's Sevens ever since. In their first tournament the national team finished in a respectable 9th place (bowl winners), with wins over Malta and Austria. In the 2006 championship, Israel won the 5th place (plate winners) with wins over Bosnia, Luxembourg, Hungary and Malta. The 2007 tournament featured a fresh team with many young players. After winning against Luxembourg, Latvia, and Hungary, they lost in the plate final to Denmark. 2008 was a highlight year for them, they played in the qualifying tournament in Bosnia and finished 3rd, losing only to Romania (eventual tournament champion) and Finland (2nd place). The team recorded wins over Croatia, Georgia, Serbia, Austria and a thrilling 3rd place win over Bulgaria (7–5). They qualified for the European championship (which doubled as a world cup qualifier) and managed to score one win there, a last gasp win over the Czech Republic.

== Tournament History ==
=== Rugby Europe Women's Sevens ===
Rugby Europe Women's Sevens
Year	Position
(Slovakia) 2013	3rd
(Lithuania) 2014	3rd
(Croatia) 2015	2nd
(Czech Republic) (Hungary) 2016	9th
(Czech Republic) (Hungary) 2017	10th
(Ukraine) (Hungary) 2018	10th
(Hungary) (Portugal) 2019	11th
(Serbia) 2021	1st place, gold medalist(s)
Total	

== Players ==
=== Recent Squad ===
Squad to the 2021 Rugby Europe Women's Sevens Conference:

- Amit Aharon
- Daria Velikovsky
- Debora Mesri
- Lily Wasser
- Limor Lev
- Meital Friebach
- Michal Lahack
- Naama Badehi
- Natalie Klotz
- Perach Ittiel
- Shoshana Kranish
- Zohar Tavori
