= Zánka =

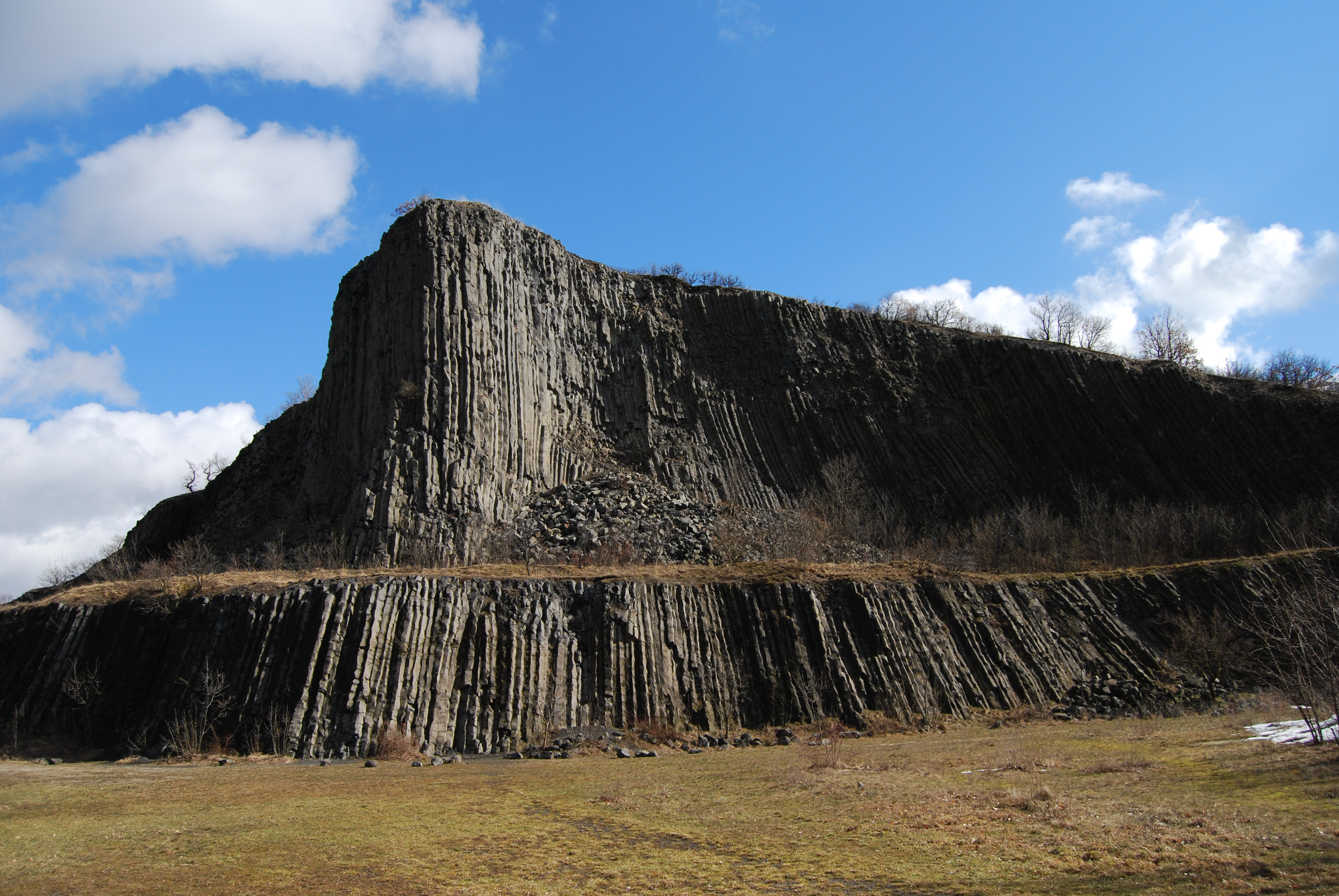
- The hill of Hegyestű

- Location of Veszprém county in Hungary

- Location of Zánka
- Coordinates: 46.87505°N 17.67841°E
- Country: Hungary
- County: Veszprém

Area
  - Total: 19.55 km^{2} (7.55 sq mi)

Population (2017)
  - Total: 796
  - Density: 46.18/km^{2} (119.6/sq mi)
- Time zone: UTC+1 (CET)
  - Summer (DST): UTC+2 (CEST)
- Postal code: 8251
- Area code: 87

Zánka is a village in Veszprém county, Hungary.

== Etymology ==
Zan is an ancient Hungarian personal name, and the original name of the settlement. The diminutive suffix -ka was added later.

== History ==
Zánka has been inhabited since Roman times. Its settlement was most likely due to good agricultural conditions. In the 12th century, the first version of what is today the Calvinist church was built in the old village; both the village and its church are mentioned in the chronicles between 1333 and 1335. A charter from 1519 mentions that the church's patron was Saint Stephen, King of Hungary. During the Ottoman Wars, the village lost a majority of its population, which had been primarily Catholic. When it was repopulated, most of the new inhabitants were Calvinist, resulting in the destroyed church's subsequent reconstruction and use by that denomination, though this later changed; in 1786 both Calvinist and Lutheranian religion used the same church.

During the 20th century, the permanent population of the village started to decline due to urbanization. However, the physical town began to grow due to a surge in vacationers. Whereas the old village was located on a hill overlooking the Balaton, and not touching the shore itself, with the construction of vacation homes the village began to stretch down towards the lake-front. A vacationing center for youths was built during the communist regime a few kilometers from the town, mostly used for light indoctrination. In the 21st century, this fell into private hands with the rise of the capitalist regime. Around the same time, a Catholic church in the modern architectural style was built in the village.

== The Old Church ==
The constructional history of the Árpád dynasty age church was revealed during the renovation and archaeological excavations between 1984 and 1985. On the basis of the construction and structure the architects estimated the foundation at the 12th century. This is the oldest church of the Balaton region. Its eastern apsis exhibits strong similarities with the construction of apses of the churches of Dejte and Hidegség, where the quadrilateral outer building hides the central inner space. This type of rotunda was widely distributed in Eastern Europe and Middle East. On this strong basement of the eastern apsis the later tower was built both in Zánka and at Hidegség.

This apsis type can be found in the Pontian region and in Asia Minor, in Egypt and in Syria. Ancient Coptic churches were also built in such style which survived in the architectural art of the Eastern Roman Empire (Byzantine Empire). This style also can be found in the western European region (for example Fulda, Saint Michele church).

Also a rare character of the church is the robust western tower. The similar types are known from the medieval German architecture, especially in the Brandenburg Mark.
