= Serbia women's national rugby sevens team =

Women's national rugby teams, Serbia

Serbia
- Union: Rugby Union of Serbia
Team kit

World Cup Sevens
- Appearances: 0

The Serbia women's national rugby sevens team represents Serbia in international rugby sevens competitions and is controlled by Serbian rugby federation. Serbia currently competes in European B division.
