= Denmark women's national rugby sevens team =

Denmark Women's Sevens Team
- Union: Danish Rugby Union
Team kit

World Cup Sevens
- Appearances: 0

The Denmark women's national rugby sevens team is a national sporting side that represents Denmark in Rugby sevens. They participate annually in the Rugby Europe Women's Sevens tournaments.

Denmark won the 2015 Rugby Europe Women's Sevens – Division B tournament and were promoted to Division A along with runner-up Israel for the 2016 Competition.
