= Bosnia and Herzegovina national rugby sevens team =

Bosnia and Herzegovina
- Union: Rugby Union of Bosnia and Herzegovina
Team kit

The Bosnia and Herzegovina national rugby sevens team is the national rugby sevens side representing Bosnia and Herzegovina. For the 2022 season, the team played in the Rugby Europe Sevens Conference 1.

== Results ==
2008

- Hungary 7 - 5 Bosnia and Herzegovina 2008 Zagreb Sevens (31 May - 1 June)

2009

- Hungary 24 - 12 Bosnia and Herzegovina 2009 Split Sevens (30–31 May)
- Hungary 28 - 0 Bosnia and Herzegovina 2009 Split Sevens (30–31 May)

== See also ==
- Rugby union in Bosnia and Herzegovina
- Bosnia and Herzegovina national rugby union team
