= Malta women's national rugby sevens team =

Malta
- Union: Malta Rugby Football Union

World Cup Sevens
- Appearances: 0

The Malta women's national rugby sevens team represents Malta in rugby sevens. They currently compete in the Rugby Europe Women's Sevens Conference, which is in the lower division. In 2016, Malta was promoted to the Trophy division for 2017 as runners-up in the Rugby Europe Women's Sevens Conference. They were relegated to the Conference division for 2018 after registering only one win by default against Moldova in 2017. At the 2018 Rugby Europe Women's Sevens Conference they placed seventh overall. Malta also placed seventh in 2019 again.
