= Lithuania women's national rugby sevens team =

Lithuania
- Union: Lithuanian Rugby Federation
- Ground: Vingis Park Rugby Stadium (Vilnius)
- Coach: (Lithuania) Donatas Streckis

The Lithuania women's national rugby sevens team represents Lithuania in international rugby sevens competitions and is controlled by Lithuanian Rugby Federation. Lithuania currently competes in European B division. The team's coach is Donatas Streckis.
