= Switzerland women's national rugby sevens team =

Switzerland
- Union: Swiss Rugby Federation
Team kit

Switzerland women's national sevens team represents Switzerland in women's Rugby sevens.

== Tournament History ==
Switzerland participated in an invitational tournament that was held alongside the 2014 Netherlands Women's Sevens which was the last leg for the 2013–14 Women's Sevens World Series.

They won the 2023 Rugby Europe Women's Sevens Conference that was held in Belgrade, and with it a promotion to the Trophy division for 2024.

== Players ==
=== Current Squad ===
Players	Club
Lea Badel	Switzers Geneva Rugby
Oumou Barry	Rugby Club Luzern
Deborah Bouvresse	Switzers Geneva Rugby
Kim Geissbühler	Switzers Geneva Rugby
Julie Gaudin	La Rochelle
Johanne Girard	Switzers Geneva Rugby
Rebekka Hosch	Rugby Club Basel
Louise Kuss	La Rochelle
Julie Luzi	RC Palezieux
Emily Marclay	Albaladejo Rugby Club Lausanne
Claire Oestreicher	Neuchâtel Sports Rugby Club
Jaya Salperwyck	R.C. Nyon
Catherine Teyssier	Switzers Geneva Rugby
Anne Thiébaud	Albaladejo Rugby Club Lausanne
Morgane Wuillemin	Albaladejo Rugby Club Lausanne
