= Croatia women's national rugby sevens team =

Croatia
- Union: Croatian Rugby Federation
- Coach: Kreso Slavicek
Team kit

World Cup Sevens
- Appearances: 0

The Croatia women's national sevens team represents Croatia in Rugby sevens. They compete regularly in Rugby Europe Women's Sevens Conference division. They competed at the 2021 Rugby Europe Women's Sevens Conference and won bronze.

== Players ==
=== Previous Squads ===
Squad to 2013 Rugby World Cup Sevens Final Qualifier

- Petra Drušković
- Maja Gajica
- Ada Tanasković
- Nikolina Pivčević
- Antea Dedić
- Lucrezia Meštrov
- Vedrana Alajbeg
- Franćeska Pleština
- Tihana Žaja
- Ana-marija Cikojević
- Željka Butković
- Mateja Spajic
- Eleonora Ozeke
- Gloria Molak
- Ornela Bešker Amulić

== Tournament History ==
=== Rugby Europe Women's Sevens ===
Rugby Europe Women's Sevens
Year	Round	Position	Pld	W	D	L
2012	15th Place Playoff	16th	6	0	0	6
(Czech Republic) 2013	7th Place Playoff	8th	7	3	0	4
(Norway) 2014	11th Place Playoff	12th	5	1	0	4
(Lithuania) 2015	3rd Place Playoff	3rd place, bronze medalist(s)	6	5	0	1
(Bosnia and Herzegovina) 2016	Plate Finals	7th	6	2	0	4
(Slovakia) 2017	Plate Finals	5th	6	4	1	1
(Croatia) 2018	Plate Finals	3rd place, bronze medalist(s)	6	5	0	1
(Croatia) 2019	5th Place Playoff	6th	6	3	0	3
(Serbia) 2021	NA	3rd place, bronze medalist(s)	6	3	0	3
Total	0 Titles	9/9	54	26	1	27
