= Poland women's national rugby sevens team =

Poland
- Union: Polish Rugby Union
- Coach: Chris Davies
- Captain: Karolina Jaszczyszyn

World Cup Sevens
- Appearances: 1 (First in 2022)
- Best result: 10th

Official website
- polskie.rugby/strona/14/kalendarz-seniorki-7

Medal record

Rugby Europe Women's Sevens
Gold medal – first place	2022 Portugal–Poland	
Silver medal – second place	2021 Portugal–Russia	

European Games
Silver medal – second place	2023 Kraków–Małopolska	

The Poland women's national rugby sevens team represents Poland in rugby sevens. They compete in the Rugby Europe Women's Sevens.

== History ==
Poland placed second overall at the 2021 Rugby Europe Women's Sevens Championship Series. They helped Kazakhstan prepare for the Olympic qualifiers.

Poland qualified for the 2022 Rugby World Cup Sevens in Cape Town after winning one of four available spots at the European Qualifiers in Bucharest. The team then won the silver medal at the 2023 European Games, qualifying for the final 2024 Summer Olympics play off tournament.

In 2024, they participated in the World Rugby Sevens Challenger Series; they placed sixth overall in the first round of the series which took place in Dubai. They finished fourth at the 2024 Sevens Challenger Series and secured their place at the new SVNS Play-off promotion and relegation competition in Madrid.

== Tournament history ==
=== Rugby World Cup Sevens ===
Rugby World Cup Sevens
Year	Round	Position	Pld	W	L	D
(United Arab Emirates) 2009	Did not qualify					
(Russia) 2013	Did not qualify					
(United States) 2018	Did not qualify					
(South Africa) 2022	Challenge Final	10th	4	2	2	0
Total	0 Titles	1/4	4	2	2	0

=== Rugby Europe Women's Sevens ===
Rugby Europe Women's Sevens Championship
Year	Location	Position
2021	Lisbon, Portugal Moscow, Russia	2
2022	Lisbon, Portugal Kraków, Poland	1
2023	Algarve, Portugal Hamburg, Germany	4
2024	Makarska, Croatia Hamburg, Germany	4
2025	Makarska, Croatia Hamburg, Germany	2

== Players ==
=== Recent squad ===
Poland's squad to the 2024 World Rugby Sevens Challenger Series:

No.	Player	Date of birth (age)
1	Patrycja Zawadzka	26 April 1993 (age 33)
2	Julianna Schuster	17 May 1997 (age 29)
3	Tamara Czumer-Iwin	16 January 1991 (age 35)
5	Marta Morus	9 August 2003 (age 23)
7	Anna Klichowska	25 March 1993 (age 33)
9	Hanna Maliszewska	19 April 1992 (age 34)
10	Julia Druzgała	28 April 2004 (age 22)
11	Natalia Pamięta	28 August 1999 (age 27)
12	Sylwia Witkowska	14 April 1996 (age 30)
13	Ilona Zaishliuk	10 October 1997 (age 28)
15	Martyna Wardaszka	27 March 1993 (age 33)
19	Oliwia Krysiak	3 November 2005 (age 20)

=== Previous squads ===
Squad to the 2022 World Rugby Sevens Challenger Series
Squad	Patrycja Zawadzka • Julianna Schuster • Tamara Czumer-Iwin • Małgorzata Kołdej • Marta Morus • Katarzyna Paszczyk • Anna Klichowska • Karolina Jaszczyszyn (c) • Hanna Maliszewska • Julia Druzgała • Natalia Pamięta • Sylwia Witkowska

Squad to the 2021 Rugby Europe Women's Sevens Championship Series
Squad	Marta Nowosz • Aleksandra Lachowska • Tamara Czumer • Malgorzata Koldej • Marta Morus • Patrycja Zawadzka • Anna Klichowska • Karolina Jaszczyszyn (c) • Hanna Maliszewska • Julia Druzgala • Natalia Pamieta • Sylwia Witkowska
