= Hungary women's national rugby union team =

Hungary
- Union: Hungarian Rugby Union
- Coach: (Hungary) Gábor Bíró
- Captain: (Hungary) Dorina Kritzer
- Most caps: (-)
- Top scorer: (-)
Team kit

The Hungary national women's rugby union team are the national women's rugby union team of Hungary. They have thus far only played in sevens tournaments and they have yet to qualify for the Women's Rugby World Cup.

On 5 April 2010 they won the ENTC (Emerging Nations Training Camp) Test European Championship 7s which was held in the village of Zánka, Hungary. They beat Poland 24–0 in the final.

On 2014 they won the European Division B tournament which was held in the Lithuanian capital, Vilnius. They beat Serbia 43-0 and Luxemburg with 47–0, and they won against Israel with 35–12 at the semi-finals. They won the finals against Lithuania with 40–5.

== Results ==
=== 2010 ===
Women's rugby – Hungarian internationals in 2010
Date	Location	Opposition	Result	Tournament
1–5 April	Zánka	Finland	21-5	ENTC Test European Championship 7s
1–5 April	Zánka	Poland	14-10	ENTC Test European Championship 7s
1–5 April	Zánka	Austria	29-5	ENTC Test European Championship 7s
1–5 April	Zánka	Czech Republic	26-0	ENTC Test European Championship 7s
1–5 April	Zánka	Poland	24-10	ENTC Test European Championship 7s (Final)

== 2026 squad ==
The squad for the Chisinau Women's 7s Trophy Series 2026:

1. Bernadett Bertényi (Medvék RK)
2. Boglárka Szűcs (Esztergomi Vitézek)
3. Dorina Kritzer (Esztergomi Vitézek)
4. Georgina Vitéz (Medvék RK)
5. Hanna Keresztesi (Esztergomi Vitézek)
6. Kata Nóra Szűcs (Esztergomi Vitézek)
7. Laura Majdanics (Esztergomi Vitézek)
8. Lili Jakubecz (Fehérvár RC)
9. Lola Paula Pallánki (Kecskeméti ARC)
10. Maja Nagy (Esztergomi Vitézek)
11. Panna Varga (Esztergomi Vitézek)
12. Rauan Tolegenova (Medvék RK)
13. Rozi Szabó (Kecskeméti ARC)

== 2010 squad ==
The squad for the 2010 ENTC Test European Championship 7s:

1. Mária Gyolcsos
2. Csilla Fehér
3. Noémi Kis
4. Beáta Szalai
5. Brigitta Kiss
6. Anita Deák
7. Zsuzsanna Jakab
8. Beatrix Sólyom
9. Anett Pintér
10. Veronika Kovács
11. Aliz Krizsák
12. Katalin Huszti
13. Judit Kovács
