= Austria women's national rugby sevens team =

Austria
- Union: Austrian Rugby Federation
Change kit

World Cup Sevens
- Appearances: 0

The Austria women's national rugby sevens team competes in the Rugby Europe Women's Sevens Conference. They placed second at the 2017 Rugby Europe Women's Sevens Conference and were promoted, along with Norway to the 2018 Rugby Europe Women's Sevens Trophy. They placed 11th overall and were relegated to the Women's Sevens Conference for 2019.

They placed third at the 2019 Rugby Europe Women's Sevens Conference and missed out on promotion to the Women's Sevens Trophy. They recently competed at the 2021 Rugby Europe Women's Sevens Conference in Belgrade.
