= Rugby Europe Women's Under-18 Sevens Championship =

Rugby Europe Women's Under-18 Sevens
- Most recent season or competition: 2025 Rugby Europe Women's U18 Sevens Championship
- Sport: Rugby sevens
- Founded: 2014
- No. of teams: 6 (2025)
- Most recent champion: Spain (2025)

The Rugby Europe Women's Under-18 Sevens Championship is an annual rugby sevens championship for women's under-18 national sevens teams in Europe. The championship is organised by rugby's European governing body, Rugby Europe.

== History ==
The growth of women's Sevens has been boosted by the inclusion of rugby sevens in the Summer Olympics. 2014 was the inaugural European Under 18 tournament which began in September.

== Tournaments ==
=== Championship ===
European Women's Under-18 Sevens Championship
Year	Venue	Champions	Runners-up	Third
2014	(Sweden) Enköping	England	Wales	Netherlands
2015	(Belgium) Liège	England	Spain	Germany
2016	(France) Vichy	France	United States	Canada
2017	(France) Vichy	England	Wales	France
2018	(France) Vichy	France	Great Britain	Ireland
2019	(Poland) Jarocin	France	England	Russia
2022	(Czech Republic) Prague	France	Spain	Ireland
2023	(Czech Republic) Prague	France	Spain	Czech Republic
2024	(France) Strasbourg	France	Spain	Czech Republic
2025	(France) Bourgoin-Jallieu	Spain	France	Czech Republic

=== Trophy ===
European Women's Under-18 Sevens Trophy
Year	Venue	Champions	Runners-up	Third
2017	Andorra	Germany	Belgium	Andorra
2021	(Poland) Gdańsk	Poland	Germany	Hungary
2022	(Poland) Ząbki	Poland	Germany	Hungary
2023	(Poland) Ząbki	Wales	Portugal	Turkey
