= 2021 Rugby Europe Women's Sevens Championship Series =

- Hosts: Portugal; Russia
- Date: 5 June – 26 June
- Nations: 9

Final positions
- Champions: Russia
- Runners-up: Poland
- Third: Spain

The 2021 Rugby Europe Women's Sevens Championship Series was the 2021 edition of Rugby Europe's annual rugby sevens season. The first edition of the European Championships Series, with the previous tournament title "Grand Prix" being abandoned.

England, France, Ireland, Italy and the Netherlands failed to field teams for this tournament due to the postponement of the 2020 Summer Olympics which took place from 26 July to 31 July 2021 and where Great Britain (encompassing the England team) and France participated and national COVID restrictions in Ireland, Italy, and the Netherlands. As a punishment, these teams were relegated to the 2022 Trophy tournament. Wales, which was relegated in the previous tournament was awarded a place.

Nine participating nations went through three pool phases and played a total of 12 matches in two legs, in Lisbon, Portugal, and Moscow, Russia. In the second pool phase, the teams were mingled, and in the third pool phase, the teams were grouped in pools according to their intermediate ranking after the 2nd pool phase.

Russia successfully defended their title, winning all 12 matches, while Poland and Spain took the second and third position, respectively. It was Poland's first ever top three result in the Europe Women's Sevens Championship Series.

== Schedule ==
| Date | Venue | Winner | Runner-up | Third |
|---|---|---|---|---|
| 5–6 June | (Portugal) Lisbon | Russia | Spain | Belgium |
| 25–26 June | (Russia) Moscow | Russia | Poland | Scotland |
| Overall | | | | |

== Standings ==
| Rank | Team | Lisbon | Moscow | Points |
|---|---|---|---|---|
| 1st place, gold medalist(s) | Russia | 20 | 20 | 40 |
| 2nd place, silver medalist(s) | Poland | 14 | 18 | 32 |
| 3rd place, bronze medalist(s) | Spain | 18 | 14 | 32 |
| 4 | Scotland | 12 | 16 | 28 |
| 5 | Belgium | 16 | 12 | 28 |
| 6 | Portugal | 10 | 10 | 20 |
| 7 | Wales | 6 | 8 | 14 |
| 8 | Germany | 8 | 6 | 14 |
| 9 | Romania | 4 | 4 | 8 |

== Lisbon ==
All times in Western European Summer Time (UTC+01:00)

=== Pool Phase 1 ===
==== Pool A ====
| Team | Pld | W | D | L | PF | PA | PD | Pts |
|---|---|---|---|---|---|---|---|---|
| Russia | 2 | 2 | 0 | 0 | 80 | 0 | +80 | 6 |
| Romania | 2 | 1 | 0 | 1 | 26 | 0 | +26 | 4 |
| Germany | 2 | 0 | 0 | 2 | 12 | 26 | –14 | 2 |

5 June 2021
10:00

| Russia | 41–0 | Romania |

5 June 2021
12:00

| Germany | 12–26 | Romania |

5 June 2021
14:00

| Russia | 39–0 | Germany |

==== Pool B ====
| Team | Pld | W | D | L | PF | PA | PD | Pts |
|---|---|---|---|---|---|---|---|---|
| Belgium | 2 | 2 | 0 | 0 | 44 | 14 | +30 | 6 |
| Poland | 2 | 1 | 0 | 1 | 43 | 10 | +33 | 4 |
| Wales | 2 | 0 | 0 | 2 | 7 | 70 | –63 | 2 |

5 June 2021
10:22

| Poland | 36–0 | Wales |

5 June 2021
12:22

| Belgium | 34–7 | Wales |

5 June 2021
14:22

| Poland | 7–10 | Belgium |

==== Pool C ====
| Team | Pld | W | D | L | PF | PA | PD | Pts |
|---|---|---|---|---|---|---|---|---|
| Spain | 2 | 2 | 0 | 0 | 43 | 17 | +26 | 6 |
| Portugal | 2 | 1 | 0 | 1 | 20 | 33 | –13 | 4 |
| Scotland | 2 | 0 | 0 | 2 | 26 | 39 | –13 | 2 |

5 June 2021
11:44

| Scotland | 14–15 | Portugal |

5 June 2021
12:44

| Spain | 19–5 | Portugal |

5 June 2021
14:44

| Scotland | 12–24 | Spain |

=== Pool Phase 2 ===
==== Pool D ====
| Team | Pld | W | D | L | PF | PA | PD | Pts |
|---|---|---|---|---|---|---|---|---|
| Russia | 2 | 2 | 0 | 0 | 96 | 5 | +91 | 6 |
| Portugal | 2 | 1 | 0 | 1 | 15 | 61 | –46 | 4 |
| Wales | 2 | 0 | 0 | 2 | 17 | 62 | –45 | 2 |

5 June 2021
16:30

| Russia | 47–5 | Wales |

5 June 2021
19:30

| Portugal | 15–12 | Wales |

6 June 2021
10:30

| Russia | 49–0 | Portugal |

==== Pool E ====
| Team | Pld | W | D | L | PF | PA | PD | Pts |
|---|---|---|---|---|---|---|---|---|
| Scotland | 2 | 2 | 0 | 2 | 48 | 17 | +31 | 6 |
| Belgium | 2 | 1 | 0 | 1 | 58 | 17 | +41 | 4 |
| Romania | 2 | 0 | 0 | 2 | 5 | 77 | –72 | 2 |

5 June 2021
16:52

| Belgium | 12–17 | Scotland |

5 June 2021
18:52

| Romania | 5–31 | Scotland |

6 June 2021
10:52

| Belgium | 46–0 | Romania |

==== Pool F ====
| Team | Pld | W | D | L | PF | PA | PD | Pts |
|---|---|---|---|---|---|---|---|---|
| Spain | 2 | 2 | 0 | 0 | 40 | 24 | +16 | 6 |
| Poland | 2 | 1 | 0 | 1 | 49 | 27 | +22 | 4 |
| Germany | 2 | 0 | 0 | 2 | 17 | 55 | –38 | 2 |

5 June 2021
17:14

| Spain | 20–10 | Germany |

5 June 2021
19:14

| Poland | 35–7 | Germany |

6 June 2021
11:14

| Spain | 20–14 | Poland |

=== Pool Phase 3 ===
==== Pool G ====
| Team | Pld | W | D | L | PF | PA | PD | Pts |
|---|---|---|---|---|---|---|---|---|
| Russia | 2 | 2 | 0 | 0 | 62 | 5 | +57 | 6 |
| Spain | 2 | 1 | 0 | 1 | 20 | 34 | –14 | 4 |
| Belgium | 2 | 0 | 0 | 2 | 10 | 53 | –43 | 2 |

6 June 2021
14:28

| Russia | 38–0 | Belgium |

6 June 2021
16:28

| Spain | 15–10 | Belgium |

6 June 2021
18:28

| Russia | 24–5 | Spain |

==== Pool H ====
| Team | Pld | W | D | L | PF | PA | PD | Pts |
|---|---|---|---|---|---|---|---|---|
| Poland | 2 | 2 | 0 | 0 | 35 | 20 | +15 | 6 |
| Scotland | 2 | 1 | 0 | 1 | 43 | 26 | +17 | 4 |
| Portugal | 2 | 0 | 0 | 2 | 22 | 54 | –32 | 2 |

6 June 2021
14:06

| Poland | 21–10 | Portugal |

6 June 2021
16:06

| Scotland | 33–12 | Portugal |

6 June 2021
18:06

| Poland | 14–10 | Scotland |

==== Pool I ====
| Team | Pld | W | D | L | PF | PA | PD | Pts |
|---|---|---|---|---|---|---|---|---|
| Germany | 2 | 2 | 0 | 0 | 37 | 17 | +20 | 6 |
| Wales | 2 | 1 | 0 | 1 | 52 | 12 | +40 | 4 |
| Romania | 2 | 0 | 0 | 2 | 7 | 67 | –60 | 2 |

6 June 2021
13:44

| Wales | 42–0 | Romania |

6 June 2021
15:44

| Germany | 12–10 | Wales |

6 June 2021
17:44

| Romania | 7–25 | Germany |

== Moscow ==
All times in Moscow Time (UTC+03:00)

=== Pool Phase 1 ===
==== Pool A ====
| Team | Pld | W | D | L | PF | PA | PD | Pts |
|---|---|---|---|---|---|---|---|---|
| Russia | 2 | 2 | 0 | 0 | 62 | 14 | +48 | 6 |
| Portugal | 2 | 0 | 1 | 1 | 33 | 43 | –10 | 3 |
| Germany | 2 | 0 | 1 | 1 | 19 | 57 | –38 | 3 |

25 June 2021
10:00

| Russia | 38–0 | Germany |

25 June 2021
12:00

| Portugal | 19–19 | Germany |

25 June 2021
14:00

| Russia | 24–14 | Portugal |

==== Pool B ====
| Team | Pld | W | D | L | PF | PA | PD | Pts |
|---|---|---|---|---|---|---|---|---|
| Scotland | 2 | 2 | 0 | 0 | 53 | 19 | +34 | 6 |
| Spain | 2 | 1 | 0 | 1 | 33 | 46 | +13 | 4 |
| Wales | 2 | 0 | 0 | 2 | 22 | 43 | –21 | 2 |

25 June 2021
10:22

| Spain | 19–17 | Wales |

25 June 2021
14:22

| Scotland | 24–5 | Wales |

25 June 2021
14:22

| Spain | 14–29 | Scotland |

==== Pool C ====
| Team | Pld | W | D | L | PF | PA | PD | Pts |
|---|---|---|---|---|---|---|---|---|
| Poland | 2 | 2 | 0 | 0 | 76 | 0 | +76 | 6 |
| Belgium | 2 | 1 | 0 | 1 | 21 | 29 | –8 | 4 |
| Romania | 2 | 0 | 0 | 2 | 10 | 78 | –68 | 2 |

25 June 2021
10:44

| Belgium | 21–10 | Romania |

25 June 2021
12:44

| Poland | 57–0 | Romania |

25 June 2021
14:44

| Belgium | 0–19 | Poland |

=== Pool Phase 2 ===
==== Pool D ====
| Team | Pld | W | D | L | PF | PA | PD | Pts |
|---|---|---|---|---|---|---|---|---|
| Russia | 2 | 2 | 0 | 0 | 88 | 0 | +88 | 6 |
| Belgium | 2 | 1 | 0 | 1 | 31 | 46 | –15 | 4 |
| Wales | 2 | 0 | 0 | 2 | 10 | 83 | –73 | 2 |

25 June 2021
16:30

| Russia | 52–0 | Wales |

25 June 2021
18:30

| Belgium | 31–10 | Wales |

26 June 2021
10:00

| Russia | 36–0 | Belgium |

==== Pool E ====
| Team | Pld | W | D | L | PF | PA | PD | Pts |
|---|---|---|---|---|---|---|---|---|
| Scotland | 2 | 2 | 0 | 0 | 61 | 5 | +56 | 6 |
| Portugal | 2 | 0 | 1 | 1 | 12 | 40 | –28 | 3 |
| Romania | 2 | 0 | 1 | 1 | 17 | 45 | –28 | 3 |

25 June 2021
16:52

| Scotland | 33–5 | Romania |

25 June 2021
18:52

| Portugal | 12–12 | Romania |

26 June 2021
10:22

| Scotland | 28–0 | Portugal |

==== Pool F ====
| Team | Pld | W | D | L | PF | PA | PD | Pts |
|---|---|---|---|---|---|---|---|---|
| Spain | 2 | 1 | 1 | 0 | 57 | 19 | +38 | 4 |
| Poland | 2 | 1 | 1 | 0 | 52 | 41 | +11 | 4 |
| Germany | 2 | 0 | 0 | 2 | 12 | 71 | –59 | 2 |

25 June 2021
17:14

| Poland | 33–12 | Germany |

25 June 2021
19:14

| Spain | 38–0 | Germany |

26 June 2021
10:44

| Poland | 19–19 | Spain |

=== Pool Phase 3 ===
==== Pool G ====
| Team | Pld | W | D | L | PF | PA | PD | Pts |
|---|---|---|---|---|---|---|---|---|
| Russia | 2 | 2 | 0 | 0 | 55 | 10 | +45 | 6 |
| Poland | 2 | 1 | 0 | 1 | 34 | 47 | –13 | 4 |
| Scotland | 2 | 0 | 0 | 2 | 19 | 51 | –32 | 2 |

26 June 2021
13:20

| Russia | 31–5 | Poland |

26 June 2021
16:42

| Scotland | 14–29 | Poland |

26 June 2021
19:16

| Russia | 22–5 | Scotland |

==== Pool H ====
| Team | Pld | W | D | L | PF | PA | PD | Pts |
|---|---|---|---|---|---|---|---|---|
| Spain | 2 | 1 | 0 | 1 | 41 | 28 | +13 | 4 |
| Belgium | 2 | 1 | 0 | 1 | 31 | 31 | 0 | 4 |
| Portugal | 2 | 1 | 0 | 1 | 33 | 46 | –13 | 4 |

26 June 2021
12:56

| Spain | 29–14 | Portugal |

26 June 2021
16:20

| Belgium | 17–19 | Portugal |

26 June 2021
18:54

| Spain | 12–14 | Belgium |

==== Pool I ====
| Team | Pld | W | D | L | PF | PA | PD | Pts |
|---|---|---|---|---|---|---|---|---|
| Wales | 2 | 2 | 0 | 0 | 62 | 19 | +43 | 6 |
| Germany | 2 | 1 | 0 | 1 | 32 | 31 | +1 | 4 |
| Romania | 2 | 0 | 0 | 2 | 12 | 56 | –44 | 2 |

26 June 2021
12:34

| Romania | 12–31 | Wales |

26 June 2021
15:58

| Germany | 7–31 | Wales |

26 June 2021
18:32

| Romania | 0–25 | Germany |
