= 2012 FIRA-AER Women's Sevens Grand Prix Series =

- Host nation: Netherlands; Russia

Ameland
- Date: 16–17 June 2012
- Champion: England
- Runner-up: Spain
- Third: Netherlands

Tournament details
- Matches played: 42

Moscow
- Date: 30 June–1 July 2012
- Champion: England
- Runner-up: Spain
- Third: Russia

Tournament details
- Matches played: 48

The 2012 FIRA-AER Women's Sevens Grand Prix Series was the tenth edition of the European Women's Sevens Championship. The first round was played in the Netherlands and the final round was held in Moscow which was also a qualifying tournament for the 2013 Rugby World Cup Sevens.

England won the Grand Prix Series title and also qualified for the Sevens World Cup in Moscow the next year, along with Spain, France, Netherlands and Ireland. Russia automatically qualified as hosts.

== Teams ==
Grand Prix Series teams

- England
- France
- Germany
- Italy
- Moldova
- Netherlands
- Portugal
- Russia
- Spain
- Sweden
- Switzerland
- Ukraine

Teams that advanced from 2012 FIRA-AER Division A tournament for round 2

- Croatia
- Ireland
- Scotland
- Wales

== Round 1 ==
The tournament was played on 16 and 17 June at Ameland, Netherlands.

=== Pool Stages ===
==== Pool A ====
Nation	Won	Drawn	Lost	For	Against
England	5	0	0	159	12
Russia	3	0	2	119	41
France	3	0	2	94	26
Italy	2	1	2	45	74
Sweden	1	1	3	14	112
Switzerland	0	0	5	12	178

16 June 2012

France	43–0	Switzerland

16 June 2012

Russia	35–7	Italy

16 June 2012

England	41–0	Sweden

16 June 2012

Italy	26–7	Switzerland

16 June 2012

France	36–0	Sweden

16 June 2012

England	24–12	Russia

16 June 2012

Sweden	14–5	Switzerland

16 June 2012

England	27–0	Italy

16 June 2012

Russia	0–10	France

16 June 2012

Italy	0–0	Sweden

16 June 2012

Russia	42–0	Switzerland

16 June 2012

England	14–0	France

17 June 2012

Russia	30–0	Sweden

17 June 2012

France	5–12	Italy

17 June 2012

England	53–0	Switzerland

==== Pool B ====
Nation	Won	Drawn	Lost	For	Against
Spain	5	0	0	120	22
Netherlands	4	0	1	141	19
Ukraine	3	0	2	83	52
Portugal	2	0	3	43	63
Germany	1	0	4	36	105
Moldova	0	0	5	0	162

16 June 2012

Portugal	0–14	Ukraine

16 June 2012

Netherlands	41–0	Germany

16 June 2012

Spain	38–0	Moldova

16 June 2012

Germany	12–19	Ukraine

16 June 2012

Portugal	19–0	Moldova

16 June 2012

Spain	14–12	Netherlands

16 June 2012

Moldova	0–45	Ukraine

16 June 2012

Spain	26–5	Germany

16 June 2012

Netherlands	21–5	Portugal

16 June 2012

Germany	12–0	Moldova

16 June 2012

Netherlands	19–0	Ukraine

16 June 2012

Spain	21–0	Portugal

17 June 2012

Netherlands	48–0	Moldova

17 June 2012

Portugal	19–7	Germany

17 June 2012

Spain	21–5	Ukraine

=== Classification Stages ===
==== Bowl Semi-finals ====
Semi-finals
Sweden	19
Moldova	0
Switzerland	5
Germany	40

Bowl Final
Germany	10
Sweden	5
11th Place
Switzerland	10
Moldova	7

==== Plate Semi-finals ====
Semi-finals
Russia	36
Portugal	0
Italy	10
Ukraine	7

Plate Final
Russia	33
Italy	0
7th Place
Ukraine	33
Portugal	7

==== Cup Semi-finals ====
Semi-finals
England	24
Netherlands	7
France	5
Spain	14

Cup Final
England	21
Spain	10
3rd Place
Netherlands	19
France	12

== Round 2 ==
The tournament was held on 30 June and 1 July 2012 in Moscow.

=== Pool Stages ===
==== Pool A ====
Nation	Won	Drawn	Lost	For	Against	
England	3	0	0	141	0	Qualified for Cup Quarter-finals
Germany	2	0	1	40	46	Qualified for Cup Quarter-finals
Portugal	1	0	2	34	64	Qualified for Bowl Quarter-finals
Croatia	0	0	3	0	100	Qualified for Bowl Quarter-finals

30 June 2012

England	36–0	Germany

30 June 2012

Portugal	29–0	Croatia

30 June 2012

England	55–0	Croatia

30 June 2012

Portugal	5–14	Germany

30 June 2012

Germany	26–5	Croatia

30 June 2012

England	50–0	Portugal

==== Pool B ====
Nation	Won	Drawn	Lost	For	Against	
Spain	3	0	0	109	0	Qualified for Cup Quarter-finals
Ukraine	2	0	1	48	42	Qualified for Cup Quarter-finals
Scotland	1	0	2	22	79	Qualified for Bowl Quarter-finals
Sweden	0	0	3	26	84	Qualified for Bowl Quarter-finals

30 June 2012

Spain	38–0	Sweden

30 June 2012

Ukraine	24–0	Scotland

30 June 2012

Spain	36–0	Scotland

30 June 2012

Ukraine	24–7	Sweden

30 June 2012

Sweden	19–22	Scotland

30 June 2012

Spain	35–0	Ukraine

==== Pool C ====
Nation	Won	Drawn	Lost	For	Against	
Netherlands	3	0	0	116	12	Qualified for Cup Quarter-finals
Ireland	2	0	1	70	19	Qualified for Cup Quarter-finals
Italy	1	0	2	27	89	Qualified for Bowl Quarter-finals
Switzerland	0	0	3	17	110	Qualified for Bowl Quarter-finals

30 June 2012

Netherlands	47–0	Switzerland

30 June 2012

Italy	5–17	Ireland

30 June 2012

Netherlands	14–12	Ireland

30 June 2012

Italy	22–17	Switzerland

30 June 2012

Switzerland	0–41	Ireland

30 June 2012

Netherlands	55–0	Italy

==== Pool D ====
Nation	Won	Drawn	Lost	For	Against	
Russia	3	0	0	88	7	Qualified for Cup Quarter-finals
France	2	0	1	97	21	Qualified for Cup Quarter-finals
Wales	1	0	2	52	59	Qualified for Bowl Quarter-finals
Moldova	0	0	3	0	150	Qualified for Bowl Quarter-finals

30 June 2012

France	57–0	Moldova

30 June 2012

Russia	26–0	Wales

30 June 2012

France	33–0	Wales

30 June 2012

Russia	41–0	Moldova

30 June 2012

Moldova	0–52	Wales

30 June 2012

France	7–21	Russia

=== Classification Stages ===
==== Cup Quarter-finals ====
Quarter-finals
1 July 2012
England	31
Ukraine	5
1 July 2012
Spain	31
Germany	5
1 July 2012
Netherlands	0
France	22
1 July 2012
Russia	27
Ireland	0

Semi-finals
1 July 2012
England	24
Russia	10
1 July 2012
Spain	24
France	12

Cup Final
1 July 2012
England	27
Spain	7
3rd Place
1 July 2012
Russia	24
France	12

==== Plate Semi-finals ====
Semi-finals
1 July 2012
Ireland	17
Ukraine	0
1 July 2012
Netherlands	26
Germany	5

Plate Final
1 July 2012
Netherlands	31
Ireland	7
7th Place
1 July 2012
Ukraine	22
Germany	0

==== Bowl Quarter-finals ====
Quarter-finals
1 July 2012
Portugal	21
Sweden	7
1 July 2012
Scotland	27
Croatia	0
1 July 2012
Wales	22
Switzerland	0
1 July 2012
Italy	14
Moldova	0

Semi-finals
1 July 2012
Portugal	26
Wales	5
1 July 2012
Scotland	22
Italy	17

Bowl Final
1 July 2012
Portugal	26
Scotland	5
11th Place
1 July 2012
Wales	19
Italy	14

==== Shield Semi-finals ====
Semi-finals
1 July 2012
Switzerland	7
Sweden	10
1 July 2012
Moldova	24
Croatia	0

Shield Final
1 July 2012
Sweden	7
Moldova	0
15th Place
1 July 2012
Switzerland	15
Croatia	5

=== Final standings ===
Legend
Qualified to 2013 Rugby World Cup Sevens
Already qualified

Rank	Team
1st place, gold medalist(s)	England
2nd place, silver medalist(s)	Spain
3rd place, bronze medalist(s)	Russia
4	France
5	Netherlands
6	Ireland
7	Ukraine
8	Germany
9	Portugal
10	Scotland
11	Wales
12	Italy
13	Sweden
14	Moldova
15	Switzerland
16	Croatia
