= 2015 Rugby Europe Women's U18 Sevens Championship =

2015 Women’s U18 Sevens Championship
- Countries: Belgium
- Number of teams: 12
- Champions: England
- Runners-up: Spain
- Matches played: 34

The 2015 Rugby Europe Women’s U18 Sevens Championship was the second edition of the championship. The tournament was held in Liège, Belgium in September. England were crowned Champions.

== Pool stages ==
Legend
	Qualified for the Cup Quarter-Finals
	Qualified for the Bowl Semi-Finals

=== Pool A ===
Team	P	W	D	L	PF	PA	PD
England	3	3	0	0	104	5	99
Germany	3	2	0	1	34	44	-10
Portugal	3	1	0	2	36	34	2
Ukraine	3	0	0	3	10	101	-91

- England 48-0 Ukraine
- Portugal 0-12 Germany
- England 39-0 Germany
- Portugal 31-5 Ukraine
- Germany 22- 5 Ukraine
- England 17-5 Portugal

=== Pool B ===
Team	P	W	D	L	PF	PA	PD
Spain	3	2	1	0	66	26	40
Wales	3	2	1	0	44	24	20
Ireland	3	1	0	2	42	44	-2
Italy	3	0	0	3	17	75	-58

- Wales 12-12 Spain
- Ireland 21-12 Italy
- Wales 22-5 Italy
- Ireland 14-22 Spain
- Italy 0-32 Spain
- Wales 10-7 Ireland

=== Pool C ===
Team	P	W	D	L	PF	PA	PD
Netherlands	3	3	0	0	50	15	35
Russia	3	1	0	2	22	36	-14
Sweden	3	1	0	2	17	31	-14
Belgium	3	0	0	3	17	24	-7

- Netherlands 12-10 Belgium
- Russia 17-5 Sweden
- Netherlands 14-5 Sweden
- Russia 5-7 Belgium
- Sweden 7-0 Belgium
- Netherlands 24-0 Russia

== Knockout stages ==
Cup Quarter-Finals

Quarter-finals
England	46
Ireland	7
Portugal	10
Netherlands	7
Spain	24
Belgium	0
Germany	27
Wales	12

Semi-finals
England	43
Germany	5
Spain	22
Portugal	0

Cup Final
England	27
Spain	10
3rd Place
Germany	19
Portugal	0

Plate Semi-Finals

Semi-finals
Ireland	26
Wales	19
Netherlands	22
Belgium	0

Plate Final
Netherlands	31
Ireland	0
7th Place
Wales	24
Belgium	5

Bowl Semi-Finals

Semi-finals
Ukraine	12
Russia	7
Italy	12
Sweden	7

Bowl Final
Italy	12
Ukraine	5
11th Place
Sweden	10
Russia	5
