= 2018 Rugby Europe Women's U18 Sevens Championship =

2018 Rugby Europe Women’s U18 Sevens Championship
- Countries: France
- Number of teams: 16
- Champions: France
- Runners-up: Great Britain
- Matches played: 48
- Tries scored: 234 (average 4.9 per match)

The 2018 Rugby Europe Women’s U18 Sevens Championship was a qualifier for the 2018 Summer Youth Olympics in Buenos Aires, Argentina. The tournament was the fifth edition and was again held in Vichy France. Great Britain was the top seeded side and the favourites to win the competition but lost to France in the final 22–0.

== Teams ==
- France
- Great Britain
- Ireland
- Italy
- Russia
- Netherlands
- Spain
- Portugal
- Germany
- Belgium
- Latvia
- Sweden
- Poland
- Andorra
- Georgia
- Ukraine

== Pool stages ==
Legend
	Qualified for the Cup Quarter-finals
	Qualified for the Challenge Trophy Quarter-finals

=== Pool A ===
Team	P	W	D	L	PF	PA	PD	Pt
Great Britain	3	3	0	0	137	0	137	9
Russia	3	2	0	1	64	43	21	7
Sweden	3	1	0	2	41	78	-37	5
Georgia	3	0	0	3	0	121	-121	3

28 April, 10:00AM CET

Great Britain	52-0	Georgia

28 April, 10:22AM CET

Sweden	12-24	Russia

28 April, 13:18PM CET

Sweden	29-0	Georgia

28 April, 13:40PM CET

Great Britain	31-0	Russia

28 April, 16:36PM CET

Russia	40-0	Georgia

28 April, 16:58PM CET

Great Britain	54-0	Sweden

=== Pool B ===
Team	P	W	D	L	PF	PA	PD	Pt
France	3	3	0	0	108	0	108	9
Italy	3	2	0	1	77	29	48	7
Germany	3	1	0	2	43	54	-11	5
Ukraine	3	0	0	3	0	145	-145	3

28 April, 12:12PM CET

France	54-0	Ukraine

28 April, 12:34PM CET

Italy	22-7	Germany

28 April, 15:30PM CET

Italy	55-0	Ukraine

28 April, 15:52PM CET

France	32-0	Germany

28 April, 18:48PM CET

Germany	36-0	Ukraine

28 April, 19:10PM CET

France	22-0	Italy

=== Pool C ===
Team	P	W	D	L	PF	PA	PD	Pt
Spain	3	3	0	0	65	12	53	9
Portugal	3	2	0	1	69	20	49	7
Belgium	3	1	0	2	31	38	-7	5
Poland	3	0	0	3	0	95	-95	3

28 April, 10:44AM CET

Portugal	33-0	Poland

28 April, 11:06AM CET

Spain	14-0	Belgium

28 April, 14:02PM CET

Spain	36-0	Poland

28 April, 14:24PM CET

Portugal	24-5	Belgium

28 April, 17:20PM CET

Belgium	26-0	Poland

28 April, 17:42PM CET

Portugal	12-15	Spain

=== Pool D ===
Team	P	W	D	L	PF	PA	PD	Pt
Ireland	3	3	0	0	133	15	118	9
Netherlands	3	2	0	1	126	19	107	7
Latvia	3	1	0	2	43	93	-50	5
Andorra	3	0	0	3	0	175	-175	3

28 April, 11:28AM CET

Ireland	50-0	Latvia

28 April, 11:50AM CET

Netherlands	68-0	Andorra

28 April, 14:46PM CET

Netherlands	43-0	Latvia

28 April, 15:08PM CET

Ireland	64-0	Andorra

28 April, 18:04PM CET

Andorra	0-43	Latvia

28 April, 18:26PM CET

Ireland	19-15	Netherlands

== Finals ==
Shield

Semi-finals
Andorra	10
Ukraine	7
Poland	27
Georgia	10

Shield Final
Poland	34
Andorra	0
15th Place
Georgia	15
Ukraine	0

Challenge Trophy

Quarter-finals
Sweden	34
Andorra	0
Belgium	19
Ukraine	5
Latvia	17
Georgia	5
Germany	19
Poland	7

Semi-finals
Belgium	12
Sweden	0
Germany	12
Latvia	0

Challenge Trophy Final
Germany	7
Belgium	5
11th Place
Latvia	14
Sweden	5

5/8th Place Playoff

Semi-finals
Netherlands	17
Spain	0
Russia	10
Portugal	0

5th-place final
Russia	7
Netherlands	0
7th Place
Spain	15
Portugal	10

Cup

Quarter-finals
Great Britain	29
Netherlands	0
Italy	20
Spain	15
Ireland	29
Russia	0
France	45
Portugal	0

Semi-finals
Great Britain	15
Italy	0
France	27
Ireland	0

Cup Final
France	22
Great Britain	0
3rd Place
Ireland	15
Italy	10

== Final standings ==
Rank	Team	W	D	L	PF	PA	PD	Pt
1	France	6	0	0	202	0	202	18
2	Great Britain	5	0	1	181	22	159	16
3	Ireland	5	0	1	177	52	125	16
4	Italy	3	0	3	107	74	33	12
5	Russia	4	0	2	81	72	9	14
6	Netherlands	3	0	3	143	55	88	12
7	Spain	4	0	2	95	59	36	14
8	Portugal	2	0	4	79	90	-11	10
9	Germany	4	0	2	81	66	15	14
10	Belgium	3	0	3	67	50	17	12
11	Latvia	3	0	3	74	115	-41	12
12	Sweden	2	0	4	80	104	-24	10
13	Poland	2	0	4	68	124	-56	10
14	Andorra	1	0	5	10	250	-240	8
15	Georgia	1	0	5	30	165	-135	8
16	Ukraine	0	0	6	12	189	-177	6
