= 2015 Rugby Europe Women's Sevens Olympic Repechage Tournament =

- Host nation: Portugal
- Date: 18–19 July 2015

Cup
- Champion: Spain
- Runner-up: Ireland
- Third: Portugal

Plate
- Winner: Italy
- Runner-up: Belgium

Bowl
- Winner: Ukraine
- Runner-up: Romania

2015 Rugby Europe Women's Sevens Olympic Repechage Tournament. Spain won the tournament and qualified for the 2016 Rugby World Women's Sevens Olympic Repechage Tournament along with runner-up Ireland and third place Portugal.

== Final repechage tournament ==
Teams qualified for the tournament based on their performances in the 2015 Rugby Europe Women's Sevens Championships.

- Spain (Grand Prix 3rd place)
- Ireland (Grand Prix 5th place)
- Netherlands (Grand Prix 6th place)
- Italy (Grand Prix 8th place)
- Ukraine (Grand Prix 9th place)
- Portugal (Grand Prix 10th place)
- Germany (Grand Prix 12th place)
- Belgium (Division A winner)
- Finland (Division A runner-up)
- Sweden (Division A 3rd place)
- Romania (Division A 4th place)
- Denmark (Division B winner)

=== Pool stage ===
Key to colours in group tables
Teams that advanced to the Cup Quarterfinal

==== Pool A ====
Teams	Pld	W	D	L	PF	PA	+/−	Pts
Spain	3	3	0	0	119	5	+114	9
Portugal	3	2	0	1	93	27	+66	7
Germany	3	1	0	2	47	88	–41	5
Denmark	3	0	0	3	10	149	-139	3

18 July 2015
11:00

Spain	52-5	Denmark
	Report

Lisbon

18 July 2015
12:06

Portugal	43–0	Germany
	Report

Lisbon

18 July 2015
14:00

Spain	45-0	Germany
	Report

Lisbon

18 July 2015
15:06

Portugal	50-5	Denmark
	Report

Lisbon

18 July 2015
17:00

Germany	47-0	Denmark
	Report

Lisbon

18 July 2015
18:50

Spain	22-0	Portugal
	Report

Lisbon

==== Pool B ====
Teams	Pld	W	D	L	PF	PA	+/−	Pts
Ireland	3	3	0	0	126	5	+121	9
Belgium	3	2	0	1	29	41	-12	7
Ukraine	3	1	0	2	22	69	-47	5
Romania	3	0	0	3	24	86	−62	3

18 July 2015
11:22

Ireland	52–0	Romania

Lisbon

18 July 2015
12:28

Ukraine	5-7	Belgium
	Report

Lisbon

18 July 2015
14:22

Ireland	24-5	Belgium

Lisbon

18 July 2015
15:28

Ukraine	17-12	Romania
	Report

Lisbon

18 July 2015
17:22

Belgium	17-12	Romania
	Report

Lisbon

18 July 2015
18:06

Ireland	50-0	Ukraine

Lisbon

==== Pool C ====
Teams	Pld	W	D	L	PF	PA	+/−	Pts
Netherlands	3	3	0	0	96	0	+96	9
Italy	2	2	0	1	52	34	+18	7
Sweden	3	1	0	2	43	49	−6	5
Finland	3	0	0	3	12	120	-108	3

18 July 2015
11:44

Netherlands	22–0	Sweden
	Report

Lisbon

18 July 2015
12:50

Italy	30-7	Finland
	Report

Lisbon

18 July 2015
14:44

Netherlands	52-0	Finland
	Report

Lisbon

18 July 2015
15:50

Italy	22-5	Sweden
	Report

Lisbon

18 July 2015
17:44

Finland	5-38	Sweden
	Report

Lisbon

18 July 2015
18:28

Netherlands	22-0	Italy
	Report

Lisbon

=== Knockout stage ===
==== Bowl ====
Semi-finals
19 July 2015 – 12:28 – Lisbon
Ukraine	31
Denmark	0
19 July 2015 – 12:50 – Lisbon
Romania	15
Finland	10

Final
19 July 2015 – 16:02 – Lisbon
Ukraine	27
Romania	0
Third place
19 July 2015 – Lisbon
Denmark	np
Finland	np

==== Plate ====
Quarter-finals
19 July 2015 – 11:00 – Lisbon
Ireland	40
Germany	0
19 July 2015 – 12:06 – Lisbon
Portugal	7
Italy	5
19 July 2015 – 11:22 – Lisbon
Spain	31
Sweden	5
19 July 2015 – 11:44 – Lisbon
Netherlands	17
Belgium	0

Semi-finals
19 July 2015 – 14:12 – Lisbon
Germany	5
Italy	36
19 July 2015 – 14:34 – Lisbon
Sweden	17
Belgium	22

Final
19 July 2015 – 17:16 – Lisbon
Italy	26
Belgium	0
Third place
19 July 2015 – 16:54 – Lisbon
Germany	19
Sweden	12

==== Cup ====
Quarter-finals
19 July 2015 – 11:00 – Lisbon
Ireland	40
Germany	0
19 July 2015 – 12:06 –Lisbon
Portugal	7
Italy	5
19 July 2015 – 11:22 – Lisbon
Spain	31
Sweden	5
19 July 2015 – 11:44 – Lisbon
Netherlands	17
Belgium	0

Semi-finals
19 July 2015 - 14:56 – Lisbon
Ireland	28
Portugal	5
19 July 2015 – 15:18 – Lisbon
Spain	21
Netherlands	5

Final
19 July 2015 - 18:10 – Lisbon
Ireland	19
Spain	26
Third place
19 July 2015 - 17:43 – Lisbon
Portugal	12
Netherlands	5

=== Repechage standings ===
Legend
Qualified for the 2016 Rugby World Women's Sevens Olympic Repechage Tournament.

Rank	Team
1st place, gold medalist(s)	Spain
2nd place, silver medalist(s)	Ireland
3rd place, bronze medalist(s)	Portugal
4	Netherlands
5	Italy
6	Belgium
7	Germany
8	Sweden
9	Ukraine
10	Romania
11	Finland
12	Denmark

== See also ==
- 2015 Rugby Europe Sevens Olympic Repechage Tournament
