= 2014 Rugby Europe Women's Sevens Under 18 Championship =

- Host nation: Sweden
- Date: 13–14 September 2014

Cup
- Champion: England
- Runner-up: Wales
- Third: Netherlands

Plate
- Winner: Ireland
- Runner-up: Portugal

Bowl
- Winner: Belgium
- Runner-up: Sweden

The 2014 Rugby Europe Women's Sevens Under 18 Championship was the inaugural Women's Sevens Under 18 Championship that was hosted in Enköping, Sweden. England won the Championship after defeating Wales in the Cup final and Ireland won the Plate.

== Pool stages ==
=== Pool A ===
| Nation | Won | Drawn | Lost | For | Against |
|---|---|---|---|---|---|
| Netherlands | 4 | 0 | 0 | 81 | 5 |
| Russia | 3 | 0 | 1 | 78 | 15 |
| Germany | 2 | 0 | 2 | 41 | 64 |
| Italy | 1 | 0 | 3 | 24 | 62 |
| Belgium | 0 | 0 | 4 | 7 | 85 |

- Belgium 0-31 Russia
- Italy 0-26 Netherlands
- Russia 26-0 Germany
- Italy 14-0 Belgium
- Netherlands 26-5 Germany
- Russia 21-5 Italy
- Netherlands 19-0 Belgium
- Italy 5-15 Germany
- Russia 0-10 Netherlands
- Germany 21-7 Belgium

=== Pool B ===
| Nation | Won | Drawn | Lost | For | Against |
|---|---|---|---|---|---|
| England | 4 | 0 | 0 | 179 | 0 |
| Wales | 3 | 0 | 1 | 51 | 60 |
| Ireland | 2 | 0 | 2 | 55 | 67 |
| Portugal | 1 | 0 | 3 | 29 | 98 |
| Sweden | 0 | 0 | 4 | 29 | 118 |

- Sweden 0-48 England
- Ireland 19-7 Portugal
- England 43-0 Wales
- Ireland 31-5 Sweden
- Portugal 5-17 Wales
- England 43-0 Ireland
- Portugal 17-17 Sweden
- Ireland 5-12 Wales
- England 45-0 Portugal
- Wales 22-7 Sweden

== Knockout stage ==
=== Bowl ===
- 9th place: Belgium 12-20 Sweden

=== Plate ===
Semi-finals
Portugal | 10
Germany | 5
Ireland | 36
Italy | 0

Plate Final
Ireland | 31
Portugal | 0
7th Place
Italy | 19
Germany | 10

=== Cup ===
Semi-finals
Wales | 26
Netherlands | 5
England | 36
Russia | 0

Cup Final
England | 54
Wales | 0
3rd Place
Netherlands | 22
Russia | 5
