= 2019 Rugby Europe Women's U18 Sevens Championship =

2019 Women’s U18 7s Championship
- Number of teams: 16
- Date: 31 August 2019– 1 September 2019
- Champions: France
- Runners-up: England
- Matches played: 48
- Tries scored: 286 (average 6 per match)

The 2019 Rugby Europe Women’s U18 Sevens Championship was held in Jarocin, Poland from 31 August - 1 September, 2019. 16 teams competed in the tournament. France won the championship. Home Nations teams competed in a Home Nations Sevens tournament as a build-up to the competition. Scotland made their debut at the tournament and finished in 6th place.

== Teams ==
- France
- England
- Russia
- Wales
- Ireland
- Scotland
- Czech Republic
- Spain
- Belgium
- Ukraine
- Portugal
- Sweden
- Germany
- Poland
- Georgia
- Latvia

== Pool stages ==
Legend	
	Qualified for Cup Quarter-finals
	Qualified for 9th-16th place Quarter-finals

=== Pool A ===
Team	P	W	D	L	PF	PA	PD
France	3	3	0	0	143	0	143
Czech Republic	3	2	0	1	43	78	-35
Germany	3	1	0	2	36	74	-38
Portugal	3	0	0	3	19	89	-70

August 31

France	45-0	Czech Republic

August 31

Portugal	7-15	Germany

August 31

Portugal	12-21	Czech Republic

August 31

Germany	21-22	Czech Republic

August 31

France	45-0	Germany

August 31

France	53-0	Portugal

=== Pool B ===
Team	P	W	D	L	PF	PA	PD
England	3	3	0	0	132	0	132
Wales	3	2	0	1	65	60	5
Belgium	3	1	0	2	22	72	-50
Ukraine	3	0	0	3	5	92	-87

August 31
10:44 (9:44 GMT)

England	41-0	Ukraine

August 31

Wales	24-12	Belgium

August 31
14:24 (13:24 GMT)

England	43-0	Belgium

August 31
17:42 (16:42 GMT)

England	48-0	Wales

August 31

Belgium	10-5	Ukraine

August 31

Wales	41-0	Ukraine

=== Pool C ===
Team	P	W	D	L	PF	PA	PD
Scotland	3	3	0	0	125	17	108
Ireland	3	2	0	1	98	29	69
Georgia	3	1	0	2	21	110	-89
Latvia	3	0	0	3	15	103	-88

August 31
11.28am (Local Time)

Ireland	52-0	Georgia

Stadion Jarocin Sport, Jarocin

August 31

Scotland	48-5	Latvia

August 31
3.08pm (Local Time)

Ireland	34-5	Latvia

Stadion Jarocin Sport, Jarocin

August 31

Latvia	5-21	Georgia

August 31
6.26pm (Local Time)

Ireland	12-24	Scotland

Stadion Jarocin Sport, Jarocin

August 31

Scotland	53-0	Georgia

=== Pool D ===
Team	P	W	D	L	PF	PA	PD
Russia	3	3	0	0	107	15	92
Spain	3	2	0	1	75	17	58
Poland	3	1	0	2	24	45	-21
Sweden	3	0	0	3	0	100	-100

August 31

Spain	36-0	Sweden

August 31

Russia	45-5	Poland

August 31

Spain	29-0	Poland

August 31

Russia	17-10	Spain

August 31

Sweden	0-19	Poland

August 31

Russia	45-0	Sweden

== Finals ==
13th-16th Semi-finals

Semi-finals
Germany	34
Georgia	0
Poland	50
Latvia	7

13th Place Playoff
Germany	15
Poland	0
15th Place Playoff
Georgia	15
Latvia	10

9th-16th Quarter-finals

Quarter-finals
Sweden	17
Germany	15
Ukraine	34
Georgia	0
Portugal	24
Poland	7
Belgium	34
Latvia	5

Semi-finals
Ukraine	7
Sweden	0
Belgium	12
Portugal	5

9th Place
Belgium	29
Ukraine	5
11th Place
Portugal	10
Sweden	5

5th-8th Semi-finals

Semi-finals
Scotland	14
Spain	0
Ireland	29
Czech Republic	10

5th Place Playoff
Ireland	21
Scotland	7
7th Place Playoff
Czech Republic	26
Spain	19

Cup Finals

Quarter-finals
France	33
Spain	5
Wales	22
Scotland	19
Russia	24
Czech Republic	19
England	22
Ireland	7

Semi-finals
France	50
Wales	0
England	32
Russia	10

Cup Final
France	29
England	10
3rd Place
Russia	19
Wales	12

== Final standings ==
Rank	Team
1	France
2	England
3	Russia
4	Wales
5	Ireland
6	Scotland
7	Czech Republic
8	Spain
9	Belgium
10	Ukraine
11	Portugal
12	Sweden
13	Germany
14	Poland
15	Georgia
16	Latvia
