= 2016 Rugby Europe Women's U18 Sevens Championship =

2016 Women’s U18 7s Championship
- Number of teams: 16
- Date: 10 - 11 September, 2016
- Champions: France
- Runners-up: United States
- Matches played: 48

The 2016 Rugby Europe Women’s U18 Sevens Championship was the third edition of the junior sevens tournament. France were hosts and also made their debut. Canada and the United States were invited; Initially, China and Japan were also invited, but withdrew from the competition and were replaced by Andorra and a local club, Romagnat. France won the tournament.

== Teams ==
- France
- United States
- Canada
- Spain
- England
- Italy
- Ireland
- Wales
- Portugal
- Netherlands
- Russia
- Sweden
- Germany
- (France) Romagnat
- Ukraine
- Andorra

== Pool stages ==
| Legend | |
|---|---|
| | Qualified for Cup Quarter-finals |
| | Qualified for Bowl Quarter-finals |

=== Pool A ===
| Team | P | W | D | L | PF | PA | PD |
|---|---|---|---|---|---|---|---|
| England | 3 | 3 | 0 | 0 | 134 | 0 | 134 |
| Italy | 3 | 2 | 0 | 1 | 62 | 38 | 24 |
| (France) Romagnat | 3 | 1 | 0 | 2 | 26 | 83 | -57 |
| Ukraine | 3 | 0 | 0 | 3 | 10 | 111 | -101 |

| England | 47-0 | (France) Romagnat |

| Italy | 36-0 | Ukraine |

| Italy | 26-0 | (France) Romagnat |

| England | 49-0 | Ukraine |

| Ukraine | 10-26 | (France) Romagnat |

| England | 38-0 | Italy |

=== Pool B ===
| Team | P | W | D | L | PF | PA | PD |
|---|---|---|---|---|---|---|---|
| Spain | 3 | 3 | 0 | 0 | 116 | 7 | 109 |
| Wales | 3 | 2 | 0 | 1 | 69 | 52 | 17 |
| Sweden | 3 | 1 | 0 | 2 | 57 | 51 | 6 |
| Andorra | 3 | 0 | 0 | 3 | 5 | 137 | -132 |

| Spain | 45-0 | Andorra |

| Wales | 15-12 | Sweden |

| Wales | 54-0 | Andorra |

| Spain | 31-7 | Sweden |

| Sweden | 38-5 | Andorra |

| Spain | 40-0 | Wales |

=== Pool C ===
| Team | P | W | D | L | PF | PA | PD |
|---|---|---|---|---|---|---|---|
| United States | 3 | 3 | 0 | 0 | 102 | 10 | 92 |
| Ireland | 3 | 2 | 0 | 1 | 65 | 50 | 15 |
| Russia | 3 | 1 | 0 | 2 | 22 | 69 | -47 |
| Germany | 3 | 0 | 0 | 3 | 15 | 75 | -60 |

| Germany | 5-29 | United States |

| Ireland | 24-12 | Russia |

| Ireland | 5-33 | United States |

| Germany | 5-10 | Russia |

| Russia | 0-40 | United States |

| Germany | 5-36 | Ireland |

=== Pool D ===
| Team | P | W | D | L | PF | PA | PD |
|---|---|---|---|---|---|---|---|
| France | 3 | 3 | 0 | 0 | 94 | 26 | 68 |
| Canada | 3 | 2 | 0 | 1 | 55 | 53 | 2 |
| Netherlands | 3 | 1 | 0 | 2 | 40 | 63 | -23 |
| Portugal | 3 | 0 | 0 | 3 | 12 | 59 | -47 |

| Portugal | 0-26 | Canada |

| Netherlands | 19-29 | France |

| Netherlands | 7-22 | Canada |

| Portugal | 0-19 | France |

| Portugal | 12-14 | Netherlands |

| France | 46-7 | Canada |

== Finals ==
=== Shield ===
Semi-finals
(France) Romagnat | 46
Andorra | 0
Germany | 43
Ukraine | 0

Shield Final
Germany | 24
(France) Romagnat | 12
15th Place
Ukraine | 40
Andorra | 5

=== Bowl ===
Quarter-finals
Portugal | 24
(France) Romagnat | 0
Russia | 49
Andorra | 0
Netherlands | 41
Ukraine | 0
Sweden | 26
Germany | 5

Semi-finals
Portugal | 38
Russia | 5
Netherlands | 36
Sweden | 0

Bowl Final
Portugal | 40
Netherlands | 0
11th Place
Russia | 24
Sweden | 7

=== Plate ===
Semi-finals
England | 45
Wales | 7
Italy | 17
Ireland | 12

Plate Final
England | 47
Italy | 0
7th Place
Ireland | 24
Wales | 17

=== Cup ===
Quarter-finals
Canada | 29
England | 21
United States | 36
Wales | 7
France | 41
Italy | 0
Spain | 22
Ireland | 10

Semi-finals
United States | 19
Canada | 17
France | 38
Spain | 10

Cup Final
France | 34
United States | 24
3rd Place
Canada | 26
Spain | 7

== Final standings ==
| Rank | Team |
|---|---|
| 1 | France |
| 2 | United States |
| 3 | Canada |
| 4 | Spain |
| 5 | England |
| 6 | Italy |
| 7 | Ireland |
| 8 | Wales |
| 9 | Portugal |
| 10 | Netherlands |
| 11 | Russia |
| 12 | Sweden |
| 13 | Germany |
| 14 | (France) Romagnat |
| 15 | Ukraine |
| 16 | Andorra |
