= 2018 Rugby Europe Women's Sevens Grand Prix Series =

- Hosts: France; Russia
- Date: 30 June - 2 September

Final positions
- Champions: Russia
- Runners-up: France
- Third: Ireland

The 2018 Rugby Europe Women's Sevens Grand Prix Series was the 2018 edition of the annual rugby sevens competition for national women's teams in Rugby Europe. The top non-core teams will participate in a 2019 Hong Kong Women's Sevens for qualification into 2019-20 World Rugby Women's Sevens Series, and the bottom two will be relegated to the 2019 Trophy.

== Schedule ==
Date	Venue	Winner	Runner-up	Third
29–30 June	(France) Marcoussis	France	Russia	Ireland
1–2 September	(Russia) Kazan	Russia	France	Scotland
Overall		Russia	France	Ireland

== Standings ==
Legend
Qualified to 2019 Hong Kong Women's Sevens
Relegated to Trophy for 2019

Rank	Team	Marcoussis	Kazan	Points
1st place, gold medalist(s)	Russia	18	20	38
2nd place, silver medalist(s)	France	20	18	38
3rd place, bronze medalist(s)	Ireland	16	12	28
4	Scotland	6	16	22
5	Belgium	10	8	18
6	England	14	3	17
7	Poland	3	14	17
8	Wales	12	4	16
9	Italy	4	10	14
10	Spain	8	6	14
11	Germany	1	2	3
12	Portugal	2	1	3

== Stage 1 (Marcoussis) ==
Event	Winners	Score	Finalists	Semifinalists
Cup	France	19–12	Russia	Ireland (third); England
Plate	Wales	29–0	Belgium	Spain (seventh); Scotland
Bowl	Italy	19–5	Poland	Portugal (eleventh); Germany

=== Pool A ===
Team	Pld	W	D	L	PF	PA	PD	Pts
Russia	3	3	0	0	123	0	+123	9
Belgium	3	1	1	1	29	48	−19	6
Spain	3	1	1	1	22	51	−29	6
Germany	3	0	0	3	5	80	−75	3

29 June 2018	Russia	43–0	Germany
12:00

29 June 2018	Spain	7–7	Belgium
12:22

29 June 2018	Russia	41–0	Belgium
14:45

29 June 2018	Spain	15–5	Germany
15:07

29 June 2018	Russia	39–0	Spain
17:30

29 June 2018	Belgium	22–0	Germany
17:52

=== Pool B ===
Team	Pld	W	D	L	PF	PA	PD	Pts
Ireland	3	3	0	0	130	7	+123	9
Wales	3	2	0	1	40	71	−31	7
Scotland	3	1	0	2	40	73	−33	5
Poland	3	0	0	3	21	80	−59	3

29 June 2018	Ireland	41–7	Scotland
12:44

29 June 2018	Wales	15–14	Poland
13:06

29 June 2018	Ireland	44–0	Poland
15:29

29 June 2018	Wales	25–12	Scotland
15:51

29 June 2018	Ireland	45–0	Wales
18:14

29 June 2018	Poland	7–21	Scotland
18:36

=== Pool C ===
Team	Pld	W	D	L	PF	PA	PD	Pts
France	3	3	0	0	116	26	+90	9
England	3	2	0	1	80	26	+54	7
Italy	3	1	0	2	38	81	−43	5
Portugal	3	0	0	3	12	113	−101	3

29 June 2018	England	31–0	Italy
13:28

29 June 2018	France	52–0	Portugal
13:50

29 June 2018	England	35–0	Portugal
16:13

29 June 2018	France	38–12	Italy
16:35

29 June 2018	Italy	26–12	Portugal
18:58

29 June 2018	France	26–14	England
19:20

== Knockout stage ==
=== Challenge Trophy ===
Semi-finals
30 June 2018 – 12:50
Italy	15
Portugal	0
30 June 2018 – 13:12
Poland	19
Germany	0

Final
30 June 2017 – 17:56
Italy	19
Poland	5
Third place
30 June 2018 – 17:36
Portugal	12
Germany	10

=== 5th Place ===
Semi-finals
30 June 2018 – 16:06
Scotland	24
Wales	26
30 June 2018 – 16:28
Spain	12
Belgium	14

Final
30 June 2018 – 21:12
Wales	29
Belgium	0
Third place
30 June 2018 – 20:50
Scotland	14
Spain	21

=== Cup ===
Quarter-finals
30 June 2018 – 11:22
Russia	34
Scotland	0
30 June 2018 – 12:28
Wales	14
England	26
30 June 2018 – 11:44
Ireland	38
Spain	7
30 June 2018 – 12:06
France	33
Belgium	7

Semi-finals
30 June 2018 – 16:50
Russia	36
England	14
30 June 2018 – 17:12
Ireland	0
France	22

Final
30 June 2018 – 21:59
Russia	12
France	19
Third place
30 June 2018 – 21:34
England	7
Ireland	39

== Stage 2 (Kazan) ==
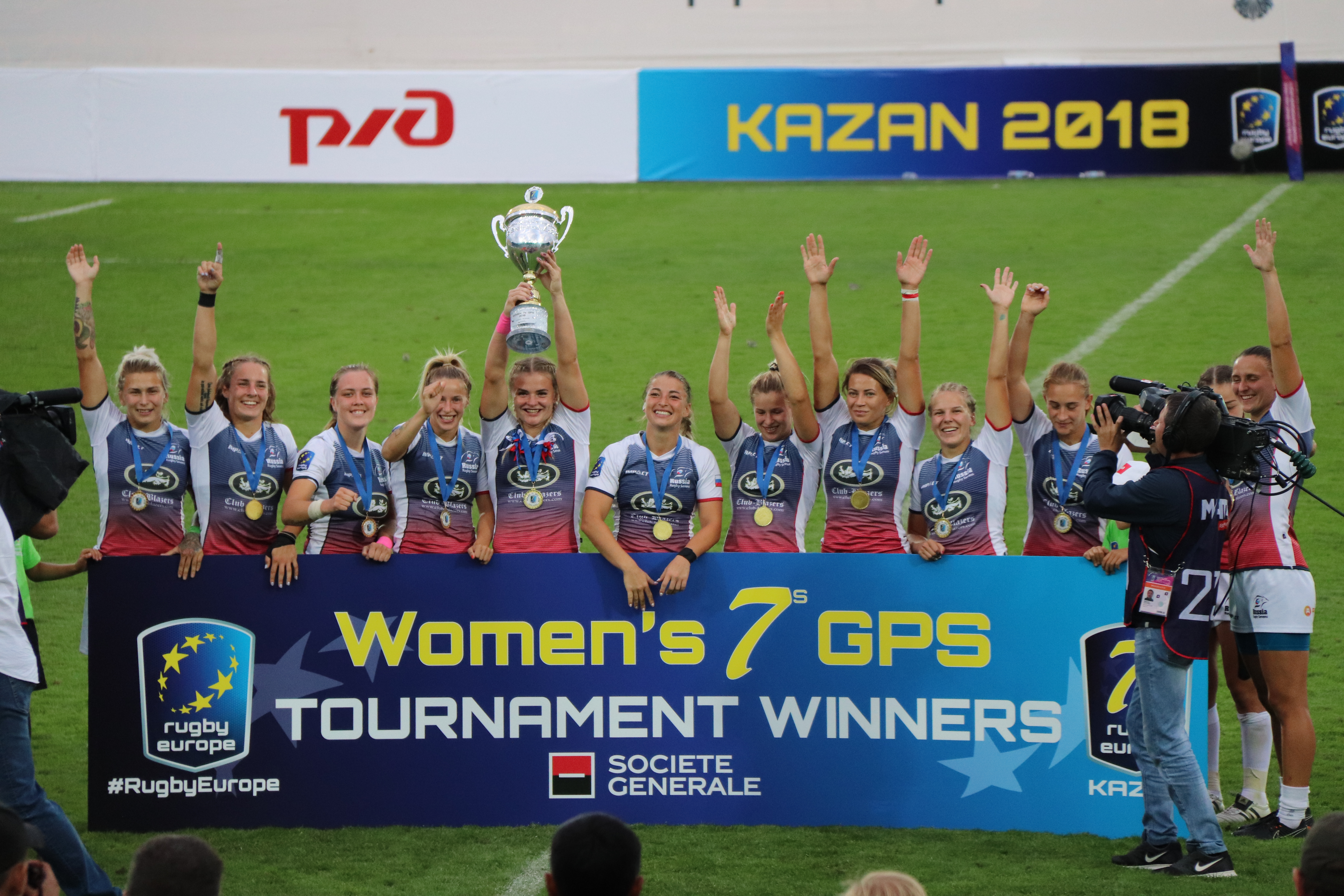
Russia, the winners of stage in Kazan and the Grand Prix Series overall

Event	Winners	Score	Finalists	Semifinalists
Cup	Russia	34-5	France	
Plate				
Bowl				

== See also ==
- 2019 Hong Kong Women's Sevens
