= 2015 Rugby Europe Women's Sevens Grand Prix Series =

Rugby Women's Championship

- Hosts: Russia; France
- Date: 13–21 June 2015
- Nations: 12

Final positions
- Champions: France
- Runners-up: Russia
- Third: Spain

The 2015 Rugby Europe Women's Sevens Grand Prix Series was held over two legs in the cities of Kazan and Brive. France won the championship and qualified for the women's rugby sevens at the 2016 Summer Olympics. Russia finished second and qualified the 2016 Rugby World Women's Sevens Olympic Repechage Tournament. A further seven teams qualified for the 2015 Rugby Europe Women's Sevens Olympic Repechage Tournament.

== Series ==
Date	Venue	Winner	Runner-up	Third
13–14 June	Kazan, Russia	Russia	France	England
20–21 June	Brive, France	France	Spain	Russia

=== Teams ===
- England (Note: England, Scotland, and Wales have already qualified for the 2016 Olympic tournament as the combined Great Britain team.)
- France
- Germany
- Italy
- Ireland
- Netherlands
- Portugal
- Russia
- Scotland
- Spain
- Ukraine
- Wales

== Kazan leg ==
=== Pool stage ===
Key to colours in group tables
Teams that advanced to the Cup Quarterfinal

==== Pool A ====
Teams	Pld	W	D	L	PF	PA	+/−	Pts
Russia	3	3	0	0	126	0	+126	9
Italy	3	2	0	1	36	65	−29	7
Scotland	3	1	0	2	21	66	−45	5
Portugal	3	0	0	3	26	78	−52	3

13 June 2015
10:00

Russia	37–0	Scotland
	Report

Kazan

13 June 2015
11:06

Portugal	14–19	Italy
	Report

Kazan

13 June 2015
13:00

Russia	44–0	Italy
	Report

Kazan

13 June 2015
14:06

Portugal	12–14	Scotland
	Report

Kazan

13 June 2015
16:00

Italy	17–7	Scotland
	Report

Kazan

13 June 2015
17:50

Russia	45–0	Portugal
	Report

Kazan

==== Pool B ====
Teams	Pld	W	D	L	PF	PA	+/−	Pts
France	3	3	0	0	82	7	+75	9
Spain	3	2	0	1	51	24	+27	7
Ireland	3	1	0	2	57	51	+6	5
Ukraine	3	0	0	3	7	115	−108	3

13 June 2015
10:22

France	50–0	Ukraine
	Report

Kazan

13 June 2015
11:28

Spain	24–12	Ireland
	Report

Kazan

13 June 2015
13:22

France	20–7	Ireland
	Report

Kazan

13 June 2015
14:28

Spain	27–0	Ukraine
	Report

Kazan

13 June 2015
16:22

Ireland	38–7	Ukraine
	Report

Kazan

13 June 2015
17:28

France	12–0	Spain
	Report

Kazan

==== Pool C ====
Teams	Pld	W	D	L	PF	PA	+/−	Pts
England	3	3	0	0	109	12	+97	9
Netherlands	3	2	0	1	65	38	+27	7
Wales	3	1	0	2	35	77	−42	5
Germany	3	0	0	3	19	101	−82	3

13 June 2015
10:44

England	40–7	Germany
	Report

Kazan

13 June 2015
11:50

Netherlands	27–7	Wales
	Report

Kazan

13 June 2015
13:44

England	43–0	Wales
	Report

Kazan

13 June 2015
14:50

Netherlands	33–5	Germany
	Report

Kazan

13 June 2015
16:44

Wales	28–7	Germany
	Report

Kazan

13 June 2015
17:28

England	26–5	Netherlands
	Report

Kazan

=== Knockout stage ===
==== Bowl ====
Semi-finals
14 June 2015 – 11:28 – Kazan
Scotland	26
Ukraine	7
14 June 2015 – 11:50 – Kazan
Portugal	31
Germany	21

Final
14 June 2015 – 15:02 – Kazan
Scotland	22
Portugal	17
Third place
14 June 2015 – 14:40 – Kazan
Ukraine	12
Germany	10

==== Plate ====
Quarter-finals
14 June 2015 – 10:00 – Kazan
Russia	33
Wales	0
14 June 2015 – 11:06 – Kazan
Netherlands	14
Spain	21
14 June 2015 – 10:22 – Kazan
England	17
Ireland	14
14 June 2015 – 10:44 – Kazan
France	27
Italy	0

Semi-finals
14 June 2015 – 13:12 – Kazan
Wales	5
Netherlands	12
14 June 2015 – 13:34 – Kazan
Ireland	31
Italy	5

Final
14 June 2015 – 16:16 – Kazan
Netherlands	10
Ireland	14
Third place
14 June 2015 – 15:54 – Kazan
Wales	12
Italy	14

==== Cup ====
Quarter-finals
14 June 2015 – 10:00 – Kazan
Russia	33
Wales	0
14 June 2015 – 11:06 – Kazan
Netherlands	14
Spain	21
14 June 2015 – 10:22 – Kazan
England	17
Ireland	14
14 June 2015 – 10:44 – Kazan
France	27
Italy	0

Semi-finals
14 June 2015 – 13:56 – Kazan
Russia	36
Spain	7
14 June 2015 – 14:18 – Kazan
England	7
France	34

Final
14 June 2015 – 17:05 – Kazan
Russia	19
France	15
Third place
14 June 2015 – 16:43 – Kazan
Spain	7
England	12

== Brive leg ==
=== Pool stage ===
Key to colours in group tables
Teams that advanced to the Cup Quarterfinal

==== Pool A ====
Teams	Pld	W	D	L	PF	PA	+/−	Pts
Russia	3	3	0	0	96	0	+96	9
Spain	3	2	0	1	65	31	+34	7
Ukraine	3	1	0	2	36	70	−34	5
Italy	3	0	0	3	5	101	−96	3

20 June 2015
10:00

Russia	36–0	Ukraine
	Report

Malemort-sur-Corrèze

20 June 2015
11:06

Spain	36–0	Italy
	Report

Malemort-sur-Corrèze

20 June 2015
13:00

Russia	36–0	Italy
	Report

Malemort-sur-Corrèze

20 June 2015
14:06

Spain	29–7	Ukraine
	Report

Malemort-sur-Corrèze

20 June 2015
16:00

Italy	5–29	Ukraine
	Report

Malemort-sur-Corrèze

20 June 2015
17:06

Russia	24–0	Spain
	Report

Malemort-sur-Corrèze

==== Pool B ====
Teams	Pld	W	D	L	PF	PA	+/−	Pts
Netherlands	3	3	0	0	69	29	+40	9
France	3	2	0	1	77	27	+50	7
Wales	3	1	0	2	45	64	−19	5
Portugal	3	0	0	3	14	85	−71	3

20 June 2015
10:22

France	38–0	Portugal
	Report

Malemort-sur-Corrèze

20 June 2015
11:28

Netherlands	21–19	Wales
	Report

Malemort-sur-Corrèze

20 June 2015
13:22

France	29–7	Wales
	Report

Malemort-sur-Corrèze

20 June 2015
14:28

Netherlands	28–0	Portugal
	Report

Malemort-sur-Corrèze

20 June 2015
16:22

Wales	19–14	Portugal
	Report

Malemort-sur-Corrèze

20 June 2015
17:50

France	10–20	Netherlands
	Report

Malemort-sur-Corrèze

==== Pool C ====
Teams	Pld	W	D	L	PF	PA	+/−	Pts
England	3	3	0	0	91	24	+67	9
Ireland	3	2	0	1	113	19	+94	7
Germany	3	1	0	2	29	104	−75	5
Scotland	3	0	0	3	17	103	−86	3

20 June 2015
10:44

England	47–7	Germany
	Report

Malemort-sur-Corrèze

20 June 2015
11:50

Ireland	56–0	Scotland
	Report

Malemort-sur-Corrèze

20 June 2015
13:44

England	32–7	Scotland
	Report

Malemort-sur-Corrèze

20 June 2015
14:50

Ireland	47–7	Germany
	Report

Malemort-sur-Corrèze

20 June 2015
16:44

Scotland	10–15	Germany
	Report

Malemort-sur-Corrèze

20 June 2015
17:28

England	12–10	Ireland
	Report

Malemort-sur-Corrèze

=== Knockout stage ===
==== Bowl ====
Semi-finals
21 June 2015 – 11:28 – Malemort-sur-Corrèze
Germany	19
Italy	7
21 June 2015 – 11:50 – Malemort-sur-Corrèze
Portugal	21
Scotland	19

Final
21 June 2015 – 15:02 – Malemort-sur-Corrèze
Germany	14
Portugal	24
Third place
21 June 2015 – 14:40 – Malemort-sur-Corrèze
Italy	17
Scotland	19

==== Plate ====
Quarter-finals
21 June 2015 – 10:00 – Malemort-sur-Corrèze
Russia	36
Ukraine	0
21 June 2015 – 11:06 – Malemort-sur-Corrèze
Ireland	0
France	34
21 June 2015 – 10:22 – Malemort-sur-Corrèze
England	35
Wales	0
21 June 2015 – 10:44 – Malemort-sur-Corrèze
Netherlands	10
Spain	28

Semi-finals
21 June 2015 – 13:12 – Malemort-sur-Corrèze
Ukraine	19
Ireland	24
21 June 2015 – 13:34 – Malemort-sur-Corrèze
Wales	12
Netherlands	31

Final
21 June 2015 – 16:16 – Malemort-sur-Corrèze
Ireland	19
Netherlands	5
Third place
21 June 2015 – 15:54 – Malemort-sur-Corrèze
Ukraine	33
Wales	7

==== Cup ====
Quarter-finals
21 June 2015 – 10:00 – Malemort-sur-Corrèze
Russia	36
Ukraine	0
21 June 2015 – 11:06 – Malemort-sur-Corrèze
Ireland	0
France	34
21 June 2015 – 10:22 – Malemort-sur-Corrèze
England	35
Wales	0
21 June 2015 – 10:44 – Malemort-sur-Corrèze
Netherlands	10
Spain	28

Semi-finals
21 June 2015 – 13:56 – Malemort-sur-Corrèze
Russia	10
France	19
21 June 2015 – 14:18 – Malemort-sur-Corrèze
England	5
Spain	10

Final
21 June 2015 – 17:05 – Malemort-sur-Corrèze
France	20
Spain	0
Third place
21 June 2015 – 16:43 – Malemort-sur-Corrèze
Russia	32
England	7

== Grand Prix standings ==
Legend
Qualified for the 2016 Summer Olympics.
Qualified for the Rugby World Repechage Tournament.
Qualified for the Rugby Europe Repechage Tournament
Already Qualified for Olympics and Relegated to Division A
Qualified Rugby Europe Repechage Tournament and Relegated to Division A
Ineligible for Olympic Qualification – Already Qualified for Olympics

Rank	Team	Kazan	Brive	Points
1st place, gold medalist(s)	France	18	20	38
2nd place, silver medalist(s)	Russia	20	16	36
3rd place, bronze medalist(s)	Spain	14	18	32
4	England	16	14	30
5	Ireland	12	12	24
6	Netherlands	10	10	20
7	Wales	6	8	14
8	Italy	8	1	9
9	Ukraine	2	6	8
10	Portugal	3	4	7
11	Scotland	4	2	6
12	Germany	1	3	4

== See also ==
- 2015 Rugby Europe Men's Sevens Championships
