= 2017 Rugby Europe Women's Sevens Grand Prix Series =

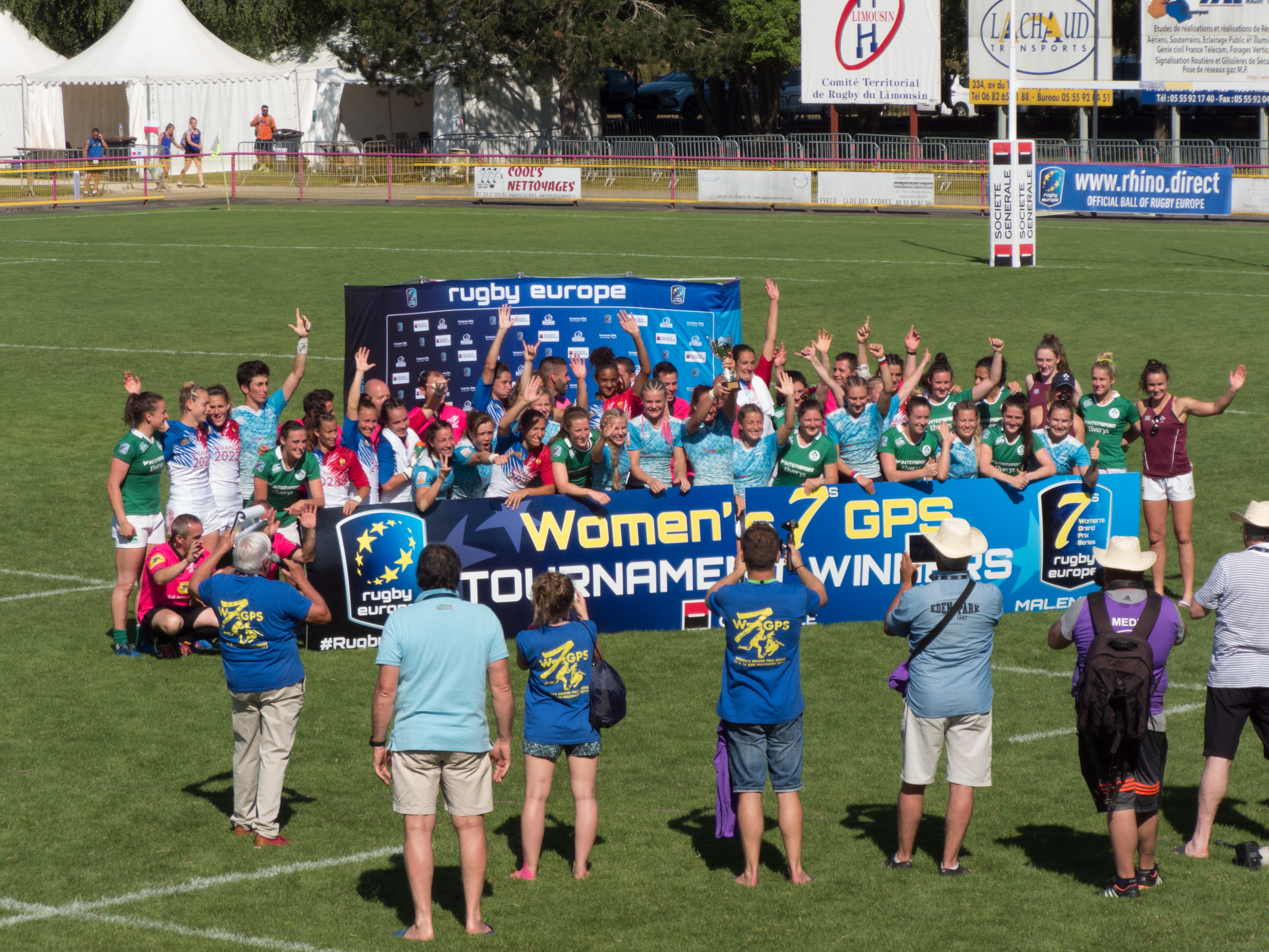
- Russia, France and Ireland share the podium at Malemort
- Hosts: France; Russia
- Nations: 12

Final positions
- Champions: Russia
- Runners-up: Ireland
- Third: France

The 2017 Rugby Europe Women's Sevens Grand Prix Series was the top level of international women's rugby sevens competitions organised by Rugby Europe during 2017. The series featured two tournaments, one hosted in Malemort and one hosted in Kazan. Russia won both tournaments and finished as overall champions. Ireland finished third in both tournaments and finished as the series runners–up. The series also served as a 2018 Rugby World Cup Sevens qualifier and Ireland qualified for the World Cup based on their performances in the series. Sweden and the Netherlands were relegated to the 2018 Trophy series.

== Malemort ==
Malemort Tournament
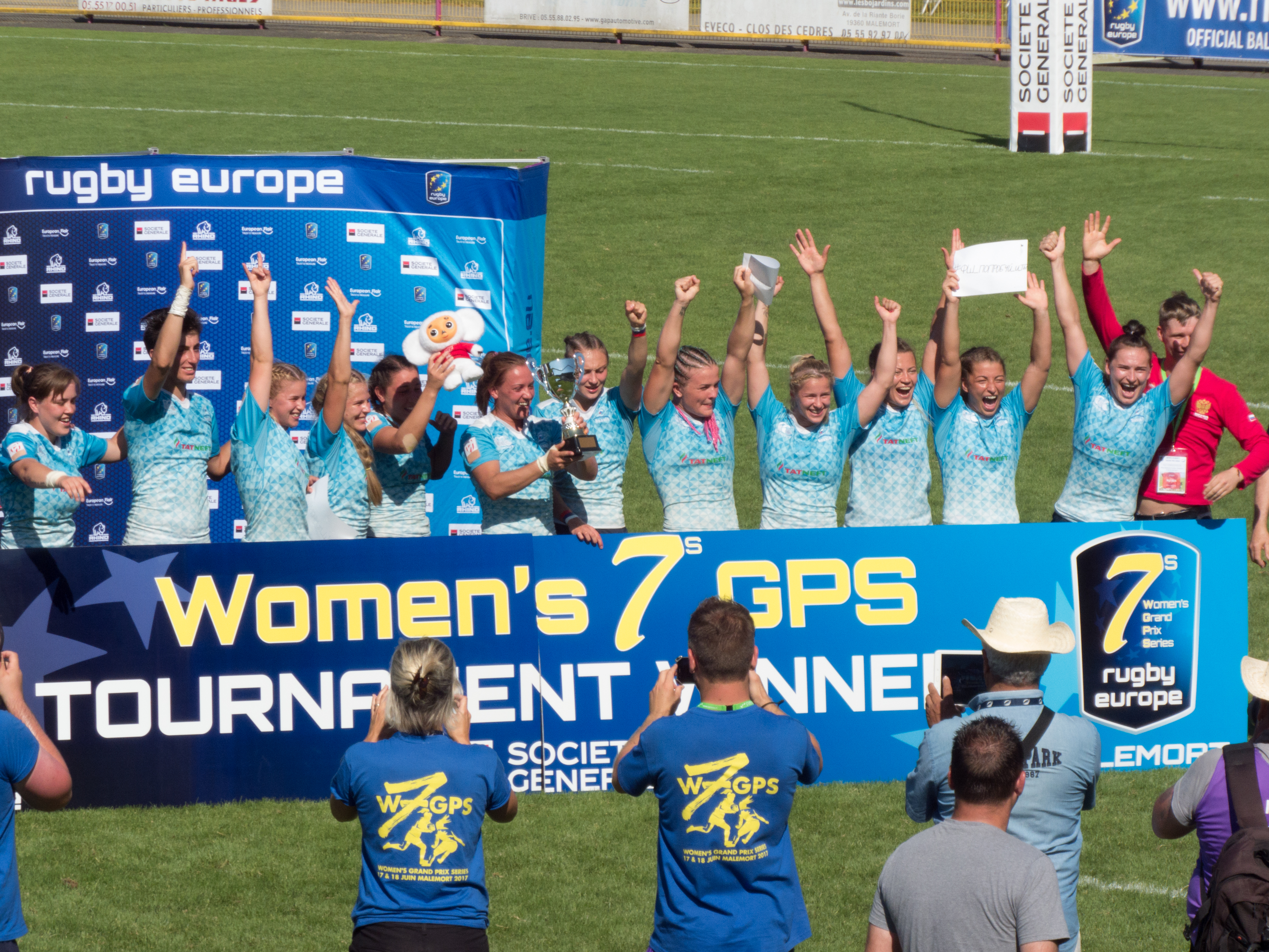
- Malemort Tournament cup winners, Russia
- Host nation: France
- Date: 17–18 June 2017

Cup
- Champion: Russia
- Runner-up: France
- Third: Ireland

5th Place
- Winner: Spain
- Runner-up: Wales

Challenge Trophy
- Winner: Sweden
- Runner-up: Poland

=== Pool stages ===
==== Pool A ====
| Teams | Pld | W | D | L | PF | PA | +/− | Pts |
|---|---|---|---|---|---|---|---|---|
| Russia | 3 | 3 | 0 | 0 | 106 | 0 | +106 | 9 |
| Spain | 3 | 1 | 1 | 1 | 31 | 29 | +2 | 6 |
| Poland | 3 | 0 | 2 | 1 | 24 | 65 | -41 | 5 |
| Netherlands | 3 | 0 | 1 | 2 | 12 | 79 | -67 | 4 |

Matches

17 June 2017
10:00

| Russia | 29–0 | Poland |

17 June 2017
10:22

| Netherlands | 0–19 | Spain |

17 June 2017
12:45

| Russia | 17–0 | Spain |

17 June 2017
13:07

| Netherlands | 12–12 | Poland |

17 June 2017
15:30

| Russia | 48–0 | Netherlands |

17 June 2017
15:52

| Spain | 12–12 | Poland |

==== Pool B ====
| Teams | Pld | W | D | L | PF | PA | +/− | Pts |
|---|---|---|---|---|---|---|---|---|
| France | 3 | 3 | 0 | 0 | 121 | 15 | +106 | 9 |
| Wales | 3 | 2 | 0 | 1 | 57 | 62 | -5 | 7 |
| Belgium | 3 | 1 | 0 | 2 | 36 | 64 | -28 | 5 |
| Sweden | 3 | 0 | 0 | 3 | 22 | 95 | -73 | 3 |

Matches

17 June 2017
11:28

| Wales | 28–0 | Belgium |

17 June 2017
11:50

| France | 40–5 | Sweden |

17 June 2017
14:13

| Wales | 24–12 | Sweden |

17 June 2017
14:35

| France | 31–5 | Belgium |

17 June 2017
16:58

| Belgium | 31–5 | Sweden |

17 June 2017
17:20

| France | 50–5 | Wales |

==== Pool C ====
| Teams | Pld | W | D | L | PF | PA | +/− | Pts |
|---|---|---|---|---|---|---|---|---|
| Ireland | 3 | 3 | 0 | 0 | 93 | 26 | +67 | 9 |
| England | 3 | 2 | 0 | 1 | 76 | 39 | +37 | 7 |
| Italy | 3 | 1 | 0 | 2 | 53 | 41 | +12 | 5 |
| Portugal | 3 | 0 | 0 | 3 | 7 | 123 | -116 | 3 |

Matches

17 June 2017
10:44

| England | 45–0 | Portugal |

17 June 2017
11:06

| Ireland | 22–7 | Italy |

17 June 2017
13:29

| England | 19–15 | Italy |

17 June 2017
13:51

| Ireland | 47–7 | Portugal |

17 June 2017
16:14

| England | 12–24 | Ireland |

17 June 2017
16:36

| Italy | 31–0 | Portugal |

=== Knockout stage ===
==== Challenge Trophy ====
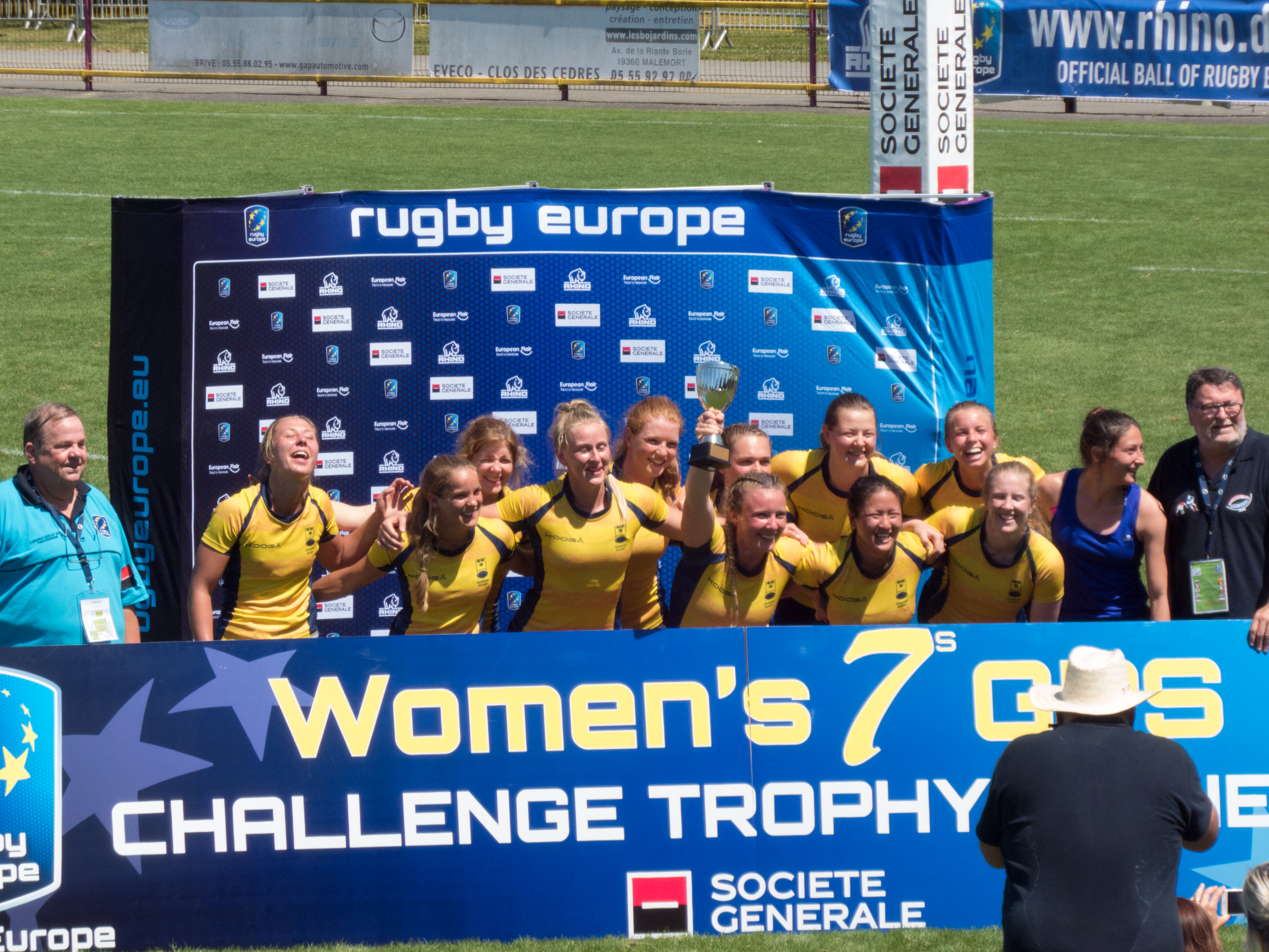
18 June 2017: Sweden win the Challenge Trophy at Malemort

Semi-finals
18 June 2017 – 11:28
Poland | 21
Portugal | 0
18 June 2017 – 11:50
Netherlands | 0
Sweden | 28

Final
18 June 2017 – 15:05
Poland | 12
Sweden | 19
Third place
18 June 2017 – 14:43
Portugal | 26
Netherlands | 19

==== 5th Place ====
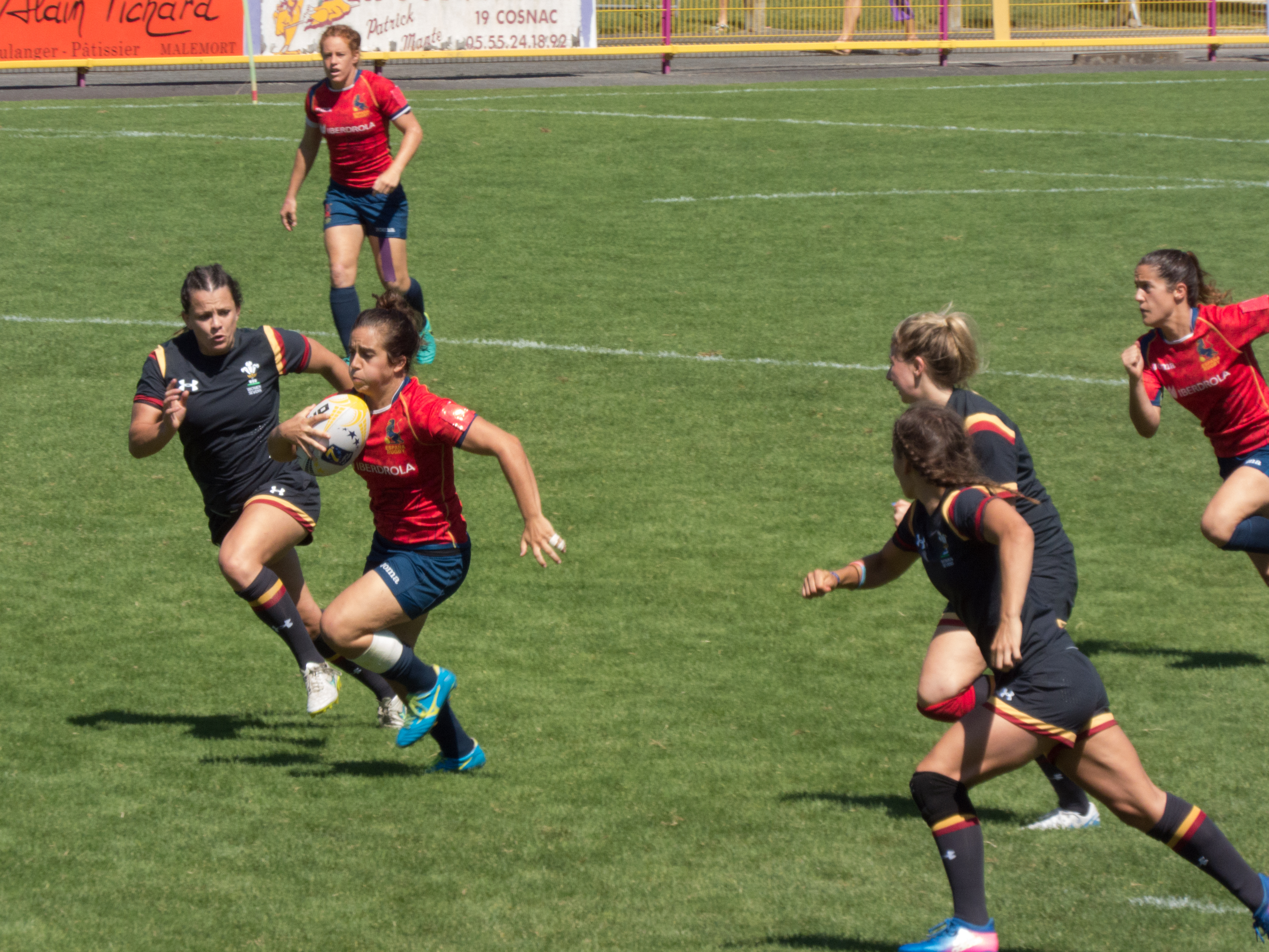
18 June 2017: Wales play Spain in the 5th Place play-off at Malemort

Quarter-finals
18 June 2017 – 10:00
Russia | 46
Belgium | 0
18 June 2017 – 11:06
Wales | 10
England | 12
18 June 2017 – 10:22
France | 26
Italy | 5
18 June 2017 – 10:44
Ireland | 15
Spain | 0

Semi-finals
18 June 2017 – 13:15
Belgium | 7
Wales | 12
18 June 2017 – 13:37
Italy | 0
Spain | 19

Final
18 June 2017 – 16:24
Wales | 10
Spain | 19
Third place
18 June 2017 – 16:02
Belgium | 0
Italy | 27

==== Cup ====
Quarter-finals
18 June 2017 – 10:00
Russia | 46
Belgium | 0
18 June 2017 – 11:06
Wales | 10
England | 12
18 June 2017 – 10:22
France | 26
Italy | 5
18 June 2017 – 10:44
Ireland | 15
Spain | 0

Semi-finals
18 June 2017 – 13:59
Russia | 24
England | 15
18 June 2017 – 14:21
France | 14
Ireland | 7

Final
18 June 2017 – 17:14
Russia | 22
France | 21
Third place
18 June 2017 – 16:52
England | 7
Ireland | 26

== Kazan ==
Kazan Tournament
- Host nation: Russia
- Date: 8–9 July 2017

Cup
- Champion: Russia
- Runner-up: England
- Third: Ireland

5th Place
- Winner: Wales
- Runner-up: Poland

Challenge Trophy
- Winner: Netherlands
- Runner-up: Spain

=== Pool stages ===
==== Pool A ====
| Teams | Pld | W | D | L | PF | PA | +/− | Pts |
|---|---|---|---|---|---|---|---|---|
| Russia | 3 | 3 | 0 | 0 | 137 | 5 | +132 | 9 |
| Wales | 3 | 2 | 0 | 1 | 51 | 49 | +2 | 7 |
| Netherlands | 3 | 1 | 0 | 2 | 10 | 72 | –62 | 5 |
| Italy | 3 | 0 | 0 | 2 | 5 | 108 | –103 | 3 |

Matches

8 July 2017
11:28

| Wales | 22–7 | Italy |

8 July 2017
11:50

| Russia | 48–0 | Netherlands |

8 July 2017
14:13

| Wales | 24–10 | Netherlands |

8 July 2017
14:35

| Russia | 55–0 | Italy |

8 July 2017
16:58

| Italy | 0–31 | Netherlands |

8 July 2017
17:20

| Russia | 34–5 | Wales |

==== Pool B ====
| Teams | Pld | W | D | L | PF | PA | +/− | Pts |
|---|---|---|---|---|---|---|---|---|
| France | 3 | 3 | 0 | 0 | 77 | 15 | +62 | 9 |
| Portugal | 3 | 2 | 0 | 1 | 39 | 41 | –2 | 7 |
| Belgium | 3 | 1 | 0 | 2 | 19 | 36 | –17 | 5 |
| Spain | 3 | 0 | 0 | 3 | 20 | 63 | –43 | 3 |

Matches

8 July 2017
10:44

| France | 26–5 | Portugal |

8 July 2017
11:06

| Spain | 0–14 | Belgium |

8 July 2017
13:29

| France | 24–0 | Belgium |

8 July 2017
13:51

| Spain | 10–22 | Portugal |

8 July 2017
16:14

| Portugal | 12–5 | Belgium |

8 July 2017
16:36

| France | 27–10 | Spain |

==== Pool C ====
| Teams | Pld | W | D | L | PF | PA | +/− | Pts |
|---|---|---|---|---|---|---|---|---|
| England | 3 | 3 | 0 | 0 | 92 | 22 | +70 | 9 |
| Ireland | 3 | 2 | 0 | 1 | 82 | 28 | +54 | 7 |
| Poland | 3 | 1 | 0 | 2 | 31 | 53 | –22 | 5 |
| Sweden | 3 | 0 | 0 | 3 | 10 | 112 | –102 | 3 |

Matches

8 July 2017
10:00

| Ireland | 17–7 | Poland |

8 July 2017
10:22

| England | 45–0 | Sweden |

8 July 2017
12:45

| Ireland | 48–0 | Sweden |

8 July 2017
13:07

| England | 26–5 | Poland |

8 July 2017
15:30

| Sweden | 10–19 | Poland |

8 July 2017
15:52

| Ireland | 17–21 | England |

=== Knockout stage ===
==== Challenge Trophy ====
Semi-finals
9 July 2017 – 10:28
Netherlands | 17
Italy | 0
9 July 2017 – 10:50
Spain' | 17
Sweden | 12

Final
9 July 2017 – 14:05
Netherlands | 24
Spain | 12
Third place
9 July 2017 – 13:43
Italy | 12
Sweden | 21

==== 5th Place ====
Quarter-finals
9 July 2017 – 9:00
Russia | 15
Poland | 0
9 July 2017 – 10:06
Portugal | 7
Ireland | 49
9 July 2017 – 9:22
France | 12
Belgium | 7
9 July 2017 – 9:44
England | 21
Wales | 7

Semi-finals
9 July 2017 – 12:15
Poland | 14
Portugal | 10
9 July 2017 – 12:37
Belgium | 5
Wales | 27

Final
9 July 2017 – 16:24
Poland | 0
Wales | 23
Third place
9 July 2017 – 16:02
Portugal | 5
Belgium | 28

==== Cup ====
Quarter-finals
9 July 2017 – 9:00
Russia | 15
Poland | 0
9 July 2017 – 10:06
Portugal | 7
Ireland | 49
9 July 2017 – 9:22
France | 12
Belgium | 7
9 July 2017 – 9:44
England | 21
Wales | 7

Semi-finals
9 July 2017 – 12:59
Russia | 27
Ireland | 5
9 July 2017 – 13:21
France | 15
England | 26

Final
9 July 2017 – 17:14
Russia | 24
England | 0
Third place
9 July 2017 – 16:52
Ireland | 40
France | 0

== Final standings ==
| Date | Venue | Winner | Runner-up | Third |
|---|---|---|---|---|
| 17–18 June | (France) Malemort | Russia | France | Ireland |
| 8–9 July | (Russia) Kazan | Russia | England | Ireland |

Legend
Qualified for 2018 Rugby World Cup Sevens
Already qualified for 2018 Rugby World Cup Sevens
Relegated to the 2018 Trophy series

| Rank | Team | 2018 RWC 7s | Malemort | Kazan | Points |
|---|---|---|---|---|---|
| 1st place, gold medalist(s) | Russia | Q | 20 | 20 | 40 |
| 2nd place, silver medalist(s) | Ireland | Q | 16 | 16 | 32 |
| 3rd place, bronze medalist(s) | France | Q | 18 | 14 | 32 |
| 4 | England | Q | 14 | 18 | 32 |
| 5 | Wales | - | 10 | 12 | 22 |
| 6 | Spain | Q | 12 | 3 | 15 |
| 7 | Belgium | - | 6 | 8 | 14 |
| 8 | Poland | - | 3 | 10 | 13 |
| 9 | Italy | - | 8 | 1 | 9 |
| 10 | Portugal | - | 2 | 6 | 8 |
| 11 | Sweden | - | 4 | 2 | 6 |
| 12 | Netherlands | - | 1 | 4 | 5 |

== See also ==
- 2017 Rugby Europe Men's Sevens Championships
- 2018 Rugby World Cup Sevens qualifying – Women
