= 2007 FIRA-AER Women's Sevens =

- Host nation: France
- Date: 2–3 June 2007

Cup
- Champion: France
- Runner-up: England
- Third: Spain

Tournament details
- Matches played: 29

The 2007 FIRA-AER Women's Sevens was the fifth edition of the tournament and was held in Lunel, France from 2 to 3 June 2007. France defeated England in the Cup final to win the tournament.

== Teams ==
Ten teams competed in the tournament.

- England
- France
- Ireland
- Italy
- Netherlands
- Portugal
- Russia
- Spain
- Sweden
- Wales

== Pool Stages ==
=== Pool A ===
Nation	Won	Drawn	Lost	For	Against	Points
Spain	3	1	0	57	5	11
Wales	3	1	0	52	7	11
Ireland	2	0	2	55	32	8
Italy	0	1	3	36	74	5
Portugal	0	1	3	12	94	5

2 June 2007

Italy	7–15	Wales

2 June 2007

Ireland	5–10	Spain

2 June 2007

Wales	32–0	Portugal

2 June 2007

Ireland	19–17	Italy

2 June 2007

Spain	19–0	Portugal

2 June 2007

Wales	5–0	Ireland

2 June 2007

Spain	28–0	Italy

2 June 2007

Ireland	31–0	Portugal

3 June 2007

Wales	0–0	Spain

3 June 2007

Italy	12–12	Portugal

=== Pool B ===
Nation	Won	Drawn	Lost	For	Against	Points
France	4	0	0	125	18	12
England	3	0	1	121	15	10
Netherlands	2	0	2	52	103	8
Sweden	0	1	3	26	77	5
Russia	0	1	3	17	128	5

2 June 2007

Russia	0–45	England

2 June 2007

Netherlands	6–39	France

2 June 2007

England	19–0	Sweden

2 June 2007

Netherlands	26–5	Russia

2 June 2007

France	26–0	Sweden

2 June 2007

England	45–0	Netherlands

2 June 2007

France	45–0	Russia

2 June 2007

Sweden	14–20	Netherlands

3 June 2007

England	12–15	France

3 June 2007

Russia	12–12	Sweden

== Classification Stages ==
=== Cup Semi-finals ===
Semi-finals
3 June 2007
Spain	10
England	12
3 June 2007
Wales	0
France	21

Cup Final
3 June 2007
France	19
England	5
3rd Place
3 June 2007
Spain	10
Wales	0

=== Plate Semi-finals ===
Semi-finals
3 June 2007
Ireland	26
Sweden	0
3 June 2007
Italy	17
Netherlands	15

Plate Final
3 June 2007
Ireland	19
Italy	5
7th Place
3 June 2007
Netherlands	12
Sweden	10

=== Bowl Final ===
Bowl Final
3 June 2007
Russia	26
Portugal	7
