= London Women's Sevens =

The London Women's Sevens is part of the London Sevens, and was first played in 2012 when the IRB promoted a Women's Challenge tournament that was hosted alongside the existing men's tournament.

In 2013 the tournament was an invitational event organised and sponsored by the RFU. The tournament was not held in 2014, but was reinstituted for the 2015 season as the first edition of the London Sevens to be a part of the World Rugby Women's Sevens Series.

== Results ==
Year	Venue	Cup final			Placings		Ref
		Winner	Score	Runner-up	Plate	Bowl	
2012	Twickenham	England	34–7	Netherlands	Russia	China	
2013	Twickenham	England	36–7	Australia	Ireland		
Tournament not held in 2014
2015	Twickenham	Australia	20–17	Canada	England	Fiji	
Tournament not held 2016–present

== 2012: IRB Women's Challenge ==
Twickenham, London 12–13 May 2012

Group A

Nation	Won	Drawn	Lost	For	Against
England	3	0	0	89	5
South Africa	2	0	1	49	51
Brazil	1	0	2	36	83
Kazakhstan	0	0	3	31	66

- England 26 - 5 Kazakhstan
- South Africa 28 - 17 Brazil
- England 41 - 0 Brazil
- South Africa 21 - 12 Kazakhstan
- England 22 - 0 South Africa
- Brazil 19 - 14 Kazakhstan

Group B

Nation	Won	Drawn	Lost	For	Against
Netherlands	3	0	0	58	19
Canada	2	0	1	97	15
Russia	1	0	2	19	58
Portugal	0	0	3	15	97

- Canada 14 - 15 Netherlands
- Russia 19 - 10 Portugal
- Canada 54 - 0 Portugal
- Russia 0 - 19 Netherlands
- Canada 29-0 Russia
- Portugal 5 - 24 Netherlands

Plate Semi Finals (5th-8th)

- Russia 19-14 South Africa
- France 14-19 United States

7th/8th Match

- South Africa 14-7 France

Plate final: 5th/6th Match

- Russia 7-22 United States

Group C

Nation	Won	Drawn	Lost	For	Against
Australia	3	0	0	58	10
France	2	0	1	36	41
United States	1	0	2	62	34
China	0	0	3	10	101

- Australia 27 - 5 China
- United States 7 - 12 France
- Australia 29 - 0 France
- United States 50 - 0 China
- Australia 22 - 5 United States
- France 24 - 5 China

Bowl Semi Finals (9th-12th)

- Kazakhstan 10-26 Portugal
- Brazil 14-33 China

11th/12th Match

- Kazakhstan 19-17 Brazil

Bowl final:9th/10th Match

- Portugal 5-43 China

Quarter-finals (1st-8th)

- England 19-10 Russia
- Canada 17-0 South Africa
- Netherlands 10-0 France
- Australia 19-0 United States

Cup Semi Finals (1st-4th)

- England 17-12 Canada (AET)
- Netherlands 14-12 Australia

3rd/4th place

- Canada 19-14 Australia

Cup Final: 1st/2nd place

- England 34-7 Netherlands

== 2013: Women's Invitational Sevens ==
Twickenham, London 11–12 May 2013

Pool A

Nation	Won	Drawn	Lost	For	Against
England	2	0	1	89	25
Australia	2	0	1	65	33
Spain	2	0	1	26	29
France	0	0	3	0	78

- England 38-0 France
- Australia 12-14 Spain
- England 17-5 Spain
- Australia 33-0 France
- Spain 7-0 France
- England 19-20 Australia

Plate Semi Finals (5th-8th)

- Russia 12-14 Spain
- France 7-12 Ireland

Plate final: 5th/6th Match

- Ireland 26-0 Spain

Pool B

Nation	Won	Drawn	Lost	For	Against
Canada	3	0	0	49	10
United States	2	0	1	34	29
Russia	1	0	2	29	39
Ireland	0	0	3	29	63

- United States 12-5 Russia
- Canada 22-5 Ireland
- Ireland 14-17 United States
- Canada 17-0 Russia
- Russia 24-10 Ireland
- Canada 10-5 United States

Quarter-finals (1st-8th)

- United States 15-7 Spain
- Australia 33-7 Russia
- England 12-0 Ireland
- Canada 12-7 France

Cup Semi Finals (1st-4th)

- Australia 28-7 United States
- England 17-12 Canada

Cup Final: 1st/2nd place

- England 36-7 Australia
