= 2017 Rugby Europe Women's U18 Sevens Championship =

2017 Rugby Europe Women’s U18 Sevens Championship
- Countries: (France)
- Number of teams: 12
- Champions: England
- Runners-up: Wales
- Matches played: 34

The 2017 Rugby Europe Women’s U18 Sevens Championship is the fourth edition of the championship. It was held in Vichy France in September. England won their third title after defeating Wales 31–0 in the final.

== Teams ==
- Netherlands
- United States
- Spain
- Italy
- Sweden
- Russia
- England
- Wales
- France
- Portugal
- Canada
- Ireland

== Pool stages ==
Legend
	Qualified for the Cup Quarter-finals
	Qualified for the Challenge semi-finals

=== Pool A ===
Team	P	W	D	L	PF	PA	PD
Ireland	3	3	0	0	70	10	60
France	3	2	0	1	100	24	76
Italy	3	1	0	2	30	81	-51
Sweden	3	0	0	3	7	92	-85

France	48-0	Sweden

Italy	5-27	Ireland

France	5-19	Ireland

Italy	20-7	Sweden

France	47-5	Italy

Ireland	24-0	Sweden

=== Pool B ===
Team	P	W	D	L	PF	PA	PD
England	3	3	0	0	85	27	58
United States	3	2	0	1	68	73	-5
Wales	3	1	0	2	63	67	-4
Russia	3	0	0	3	41	90	-49

England	27-10	Wales

United States	35-17	Russia

England	26-10	Russia

United States	26-24	Wales

England	32-7	United States

Russia	14-29	Wales

=== Pool C ===
Team	P	W	D	L	PF	PA	PD
Canada	3	3	0	0	116	15	101
Portugal	3	2	0	1	14	64	-50
Netherlands	3	1	0	2	35	29	6
Spain	3	0	0	3	15	72	-57

Canada	17-10	Netherlands

Spain	5-7	Portugal

Canada	54-0	Portugal

Spain	5-20	Netherlands

Canada	45-5	Spain

Portugal	7-5	Netherlands

== Finals ==
Challenge Finals

Semi-finals
Italy	10
Sweden	0
Spain	10
Russia	0

Challenge Final
Spain	17
Italy	5
11th Place
Sweden	10
Russia	0

5th/8th Place Playoff

Semi-finals
Ireland	15
United States	7
Canada	10
Netherlands	7

5th-place final
Canada	24
Ireland	21
7th Place
Netherlands	26
United States	12

Cup Finals

Quarter-finals
Wales	15
Ireland	12
Portugal	7
United States	0
England	31
Netherlands	5
France	10
Canada	7

Semi-finals
Wales	28
Portugal	5
England	17
France	0

Cup Final
England	31
Wales	0
3rd Place
France	28
Portugal	0

== Final standings ==
Rank	Team
1	England
2	Wales
3	France
4	Portugal
5	Canada
6	Ireland
7	Netherlands
8	United States
9	Spain
10	Italy
11	Sweden
12	Russia
