= 2017 Rugby Europe Women's Sevens Under 18 Trophy =

Women's Rugby Union

- Countries: Andorra
- Number of teams: 8
- Champions: Germany
- Runners-up: Belgium
- Matches played: 20

The 2017 Rugby Europe Women's Sevens Under 18 Trophy was held in Andorra from 22 to 24 September. This was Scotland's first international tournament. Germany won the Championship after defeating Belgium in the final.

== Teams ==
- Germany
- Belgium
- Andorra
- Scotland
- Latvia
- Poland
- Ukraine
- Georgia

== Pool stages ==
Legend
	Qualified for the
	Qualified for the

=== Pool A ===
Team	P	W	D	L	PF	PA	PD
Germany	3	3	0	0	75	12	63
Belgium	3	2	0	1	34	46	-12
Poland	3	1	0	2	55	55	0
Latvia	3	0	0	3	22	73	-51

Germany	29-0	Latvia

Poland	14-19	Belgium

Germany	27-0	Belgium

Poland	29-17	Latvia

Germany	19-12	Poland

Belgium	15-5	Latvia

=== Pool B ===
Team	P	W	D	L	PF	PA	PD
Scotland	3	3	0	0	122	12	110
Andorra	3	1	1	1	41	52	-11
Ukraine	3	1	1	1	34	53	-19
Georgia	3	0	0	3	5	85	-80

Ukraine	22-5	Georgia

Andorra	12-40	Scotland

Ukraine	0-36	Scotland

Andorra	17-0	Georgia

Ukraine	12-12	Andorra

Scotland	46-0	Georgia

== Finals ==
5th/8th Place Semi-finals

Semi-finals
Poland	32
Georgia	5
Latvia	26
Ukraine	5

5th Place Final
Latvia	17
Poland	12
7th Place
Ukraine	15
Georgia	5

Cup Final

Semi-finals
Germany	35
Andorra	0
Belgium	17
Scotland	5

Cup Final
Germany	17
Belgium	15
3rd Place
Andorra	33
Scotland	0

== Final standings ==
Rank	Team
1	Germany
2	Belgium
3	Andorra
4	Scotland
5	Latvia
6	Poland
7	Ukraine
8	Georgia
