= 2012 Hong Kong Women's Sevens =

- Host nation: Hong Kong
- Date: 23–24 March

Cup
- Champion: England
- Runner-up: Australia

Plate
- Winner: Spain
- Runner-up: China

Bowl
- Winner: Brazil
- Runner-up: Hong Kong

Tournament details
- Matches played: 23

The 2012 Hong Kong Women's Sevens was the 15th edition of the competition, and the second tournament in the IRB Women's Sevens Challenge Cup. The event was held from the 23rd to the 24th of March at Hong Kong, twelve teams competed in the tournament. Spain and Brazil made their Hong Kong debut.

England beat Australia in the Cup final at the Hong Kong Stadium to claim the Cup title.

== Teams ==
- Australia
- Brazil
- Canada
- China
- England
- Hong Kong
- Japan
- Netherlands
- Russia
- Spain
- Tunisia
- United States

== Pool Stages ==
=== Pool A ===
| Nation | Won | Drawn | Lost | For | Against |
|---|---|---|---|---|---|
| Canada | 2 | 0 | 0 | 69 | 5 |
| Russia | 1 | 0 | 1 | 34 | 24 |
| Brazil | 0 | 0 | 2 | 0 | 74 |

| Canada | 45–0 | Brazil |

| Brazil | 0–29 | Russia |

| Canada | 24–5 | Russia |

=== Pool B ===
| Nation | Won | Drawn | Lost | For | Against |
|---|---|---|---|---|---|
| England | 2 | 0 | 0 | 69 | 7 |
| China | 1 | 0 | 1 | 42 | 36 |
| Japan | 0 | 0 | 2 | 5 | 73 |

| England | 31–7 | China |

| China | 35–5 | Japan |

| England | 38–0 | Japan |

=== Pool C ===
| Nation | Won | Drawn | Lost | For | Against |
|---|---|---|---|---|---|
| Australia | 2 | 0 | 0 | 80 | 21 |
| Netherlands | 1 | 0 | 1 | 40 | 33 |
| Hong Kong | 0 | 0 | 2 | 5 | 71 |

| Australia | 28–21 | Netherlands |

| Netherlands | 19–5 | Hong Kong |

| Australia | 52–0 | Hong Kong |

=== Pool D ===
| Nation | Won | Drawn | Lost | For | Against |
|---|---|---|---|---|---|
| United States | 2 | 0 | 0 | 28 | 5 |
| Spain | 1 | 0 | 1 | 50 | 8 |
| Tunisia | 0 | 0 | 2 | 0 | 65 |

| United States | 8–5 | Spain |

| Spain | 45–0 | Tunisia |

| United States | 20–0 | Tunisia |

== Classification stages ==
=== Bowl Finals ===
Semi-finals
Hong Kong | 22
Tunisia | 0
Brazil | 14
Japan | 12

Bowl Final
Brazil | 19
Hong Kong | 7
11th Place
Japan | 33
Tunisia | 0

=== Plate Finals ===
Semi-finals
China | 21
Russia | 12
Spain | 14
Netherlands | 0

Plate Final
Spain | 12
China | 7
7th Place
Russia | 5
Netherlands | 0

=== Cup Finals ===
Semi-finals
England | 22
Canada | 12
Australia | 33
United States | 0

Cup Final
England | 15
Australia | 10
