= 2019 Rugby Europe Women's Sevens Grand Prix Series =

- Hosts: France; Ukraine
- Date: 29 June – 21 July
- Nations: 12

Final positions
- Champions: Russia
- Runners-up: France
- Third: Ireland

Series details
- Matches played: 68

The 2019 Rugby Europe Women's Sevens Grand Prix Series was the 2019 edition of Rugby Europe's annual rugby sevens season. The top placing non-core teams advanced to the 2020 Hong Kong Women's Sevens qualification tournament, and the two teams with the fewest points were relegated to the 2020 Trophy tournament. The Marcoussis leg of the tournament also served as a qualifier to the European qualifiers for the 2020 Summer Olympics, where seven teams aside from Wales and Scotland (Note: By agreement between the three unions on the island of Great Britain (England, Scotland, Wales), England represented Great Britain in qualifying for the 2020 Olympic Sevens. The final make-up of the Great Britain women's team was determined by the British Olympic Association.) advanced.

== Schedule ==
Date	Venue	Winner	Runner-up	Third
29–30 June	(France) Marcoussis	France	Russia	Spain
20–21 July	(Ukraine) Kharkiv	Russia	France	Poland
Overall		Russia	France	Ireland

== Standings ==
Legend
Green fill	Qualified to 2020 Hong Kong Women's Sevens
Blue fill	Already a core team for 2019–2020 World Rugby Women's Sevens Series
Red fill	Relegated to 2020 Trophy
Blue bar	Qualified for the Olympic qualifying tournament

Rank	Team	Marcoussis	Kharkiv	Points
1st place, gold medalist(s)	Russia	18	20	38
2nd place, silver medalist(s)	France	20	18	38
3rd place, bronze medalist(s)	Ireland	14	14	28
4	Poland	8	16	24
5	Scotland	10	12	22
6	Spain	16	4	20
7	Belgium	6	10	16
8	England	12	2	14
9	Italy	4	6	10
10	Netherlands	2	8	10
11	Wales	3	3	6
12	Ukraine	1	1	2

== Marcoussis ==
All times in Central European Summer Time (UTC+02:00)

Event	Winners	Score	Finalists	Semifinalists
Cup	France	15–7	Russia	Spain (third); Ireland
Plate	England	35–7	Scotland	Poland (seventh); Belgium
Bowl	Italy	12–10	Wales	Netherlands (eleventh); Ukraine

=== Pool Stage ===
==== Pool A ====
Team	Pld	W	D	L	PF	PA	PD	Pts
Russia	3	3	0	0	107	14	+93	9
England	3	2	0	1	95	27	+68	7
Poland	3	1	0	2	78	69	+9	5
Ukraine	3	0	0	3	0	170	–170	3

29 June 2019
11:30

Russia	47–0	Ukraine

Referee: Maria Pacifico (Italy)

29 June 2019
11:52

England	31–5	Poland

Referee: Doriane Domenjo (France)

29 June 2019
16:15

Russia	38–7	Poland

Referee: Finlay Brown (Scotland)

29 June 2019
16:37

England	57–0	Ukraine

Referee: Kathie Pickert (Germany)

29 June 2019
19:00

Russia	22–7	England

Referee: Beatrice Benvenuti (Italy)

29 June 2019
19:22

Poland	66–0	Ukraine

Referee: Katherine Ritchie (England)

==== Pool B ====
Team	Pld	W	D	L	PF	PA	PD	Pts
France	3	3	0	0	110	5	+105	9
Belgium	3	2	0	1	33	50	–17	7
Wales	3	1	0	2	36	68	–32	5
Netherlands	3	0	0	3	15	71	–56	3

29 June 2019
12:57

Belgium	26–19	Wales

Referee: Kathie Pickert (Germany)

29 June 2019
13:20

France	52–0	Netherlands

Referee: Beatrice Benvenuti (Italy)

29 June 2019
18:25

Belgium	7–5	Netherlands

Referee: Maria Pacifico (Italy)

29 June 2019
18:47

France	32–5	Wales

Referee: Katherine Ritchie (England)

29 June 2019
21:10

Wales	12–10	Netherlands

Referee: Doriane Domenjo (France)

29 June 2019
21:32

France	26–0	Belgium

Referee: Maria Pacifico (Italy)

==== Pool C ====
Team	Pld	W	D	L	PF	PA	PD	Pts
Ireland	3	3	0	0	78	19	+59	9
Spain	3	2	0	1	55	39	+16	7
Scotland	3	1	0	2	57	55	+2	5
Italy	3	0	0	3	17	94	–77	3

29 June 2019
12:14

Ireland	15–0	Spain

Referee: Finlay Brown (Scotland)

29 June 2019
12:36

Scotland	24–7	Italy

Referee: Katherine Ritchie (England)

29 June 2019
17:41

Ireland	41–5	Italy

Referee: Doriane Domenjo (France)

29 June 2019
18:03

Scotland	19–26	Spain

Referee: Beatrice Benvenuti (Italy)

29 June 2019
20:26

Ireland	22–14	Scotland

Referee: Kathie Pickert (Germany)

29 June 2019
20:48

Italy	5–29	Spain

Referee: Finlay Brown (Scotland)

=== Knockout stage ===
==== 9th Place ====
Semi-finals
30 June 2019 – 12:28
Wales	50
Ukraine	5
30 June 2019 – 12:50
Netherlands	5
Italy	24

Ninth place
30 June 2019 – 16:06
Wales	10
Italy	12
Eleventh place
30 June 2019 – 15:43
Ukraine	12
Netherlands	26

==== 5th Place ====
Semi-finals
30 June 2019 – 14:15
Scotland	31
Belgium	7
30 June 2019 – 14:35
Poland	0
England	21

Fifth place
30 June 2019 – 17:24
Scotland	7
England	35
Seventh place
30 June 2019 – 17:02
Belgium	5
Poland	19

==== Cup ====
Quarter-finals
30 June 2019 – 11:00
Russia	45
Scotland	0
30 June 2019 – 12:06
Belgium	5
Spain	34
30 June 2019 – 11:22
France	35
Poland	0
30 June 2019 – 11:44
Ireland	24
England	19

Semi-finals
30 June 2019 – 14:59
Russia	26
Spain	0
30 June 2019 – 15:21
France	14
Ireland	12

Final
30 June 2019 – 18:11
Russia	7
France	15
Third place
30 June 2019 – 17:46
Spain	19
Ireland	0

== Kharkiv ==
All times in Eastern European Summer Time (UTC+03:00)

Event	Winners	Score	Finalists	Semifinalists
Cup	Russia	5–12	France	Poland (third); Ireland
Plate	Scotland	36–7	Belgium	Netherlands (seventh); Italy
Bowl	Spain	22–12	Wales	England (eleventh); Ukraine

=== Pool Stage ===
==== Pool A ====
Team	Pld	W	D	L	PF	PA	PD	Pts
France	3	3	0	0	81	14	+67	9
Poland	3	2	0	1	43	24	+19	7
Scotland	3	1	0	2	71	39	+32	5
Ukraine	3	0	0	3	0	118	–118	3

20 July 2019
11:28

Scotland	12–17	Poland

Referee: Doriane Domenjo (France)

20 July 2019
11:50

France	47–0	Ukraine

Referee: Maria Pacifico (Italy)

20 July 2019
14:13

France	12–0	Poland

Referee: Maria Latos (Germany)

20 July 2019
14:35

Scotland	43–0	Ukraine

Referee: Aneta Bejm (Poland)

20 July 2019
16:58

France	22–14	Scotland

Referee: Kathie Pickert (Germany)

20 July 2019
17:20

Poland	26–0	Ukraine

Referee: Nikki O'donnell (England)

==== Pool B ====
Team	Pld	W	D	L	PF	PA	PD	Pts
Russia	3	3	0	0	99	19	+80	9
Belgium	3	2	0	1	36	60	–24	7
Netherlands	3	1	0	2	55	41	+14	5
England	3	0	0	3	12	82	–70	3

20 July 2019
10:44

Russia	22–12	Netherlands

Referee: Nikki O'donnell (England)

20 July 2019
11:06

England	5–17	Belgium

Referee: Kathie Pickert (Germany)

20 July 2019
13:29

Russia	43–0	Belgium

Referee: Maria Pacifico (Italy)

20 July 2019
13:51

England	0–31	Netherlands

Referee: Doriane Domenjo (France)

20 July 2019
16:14

Russia	34–7	England

Referee: Maria Latos (Germany)

20 July 2019
16:36

Belgium	19–12	Netherlands

Referee: Aneta Bejm (Poland)

==== Pool C ====
Team	Pld	W	D	L	PF	PA	PD	Pts
Italy	3	2	0	1	60	26	+34	7
Ireland	3	2	0	1	40	53	–13	7
Wales	3	1	0	2	33	62	–29	5
Spain	3	1	0	2	48	40	+8	5

20 July 2019
10:00

Spain	17–19	Wales

Referee: Maria Latos (Germany)

20 July 2019
10:22

Ireland	7–27	Italy

Referee: Aneta Bejm (Poland)

20 July 2019
12:45

Spain	19–7	Italy

Referee: Kathie Pickert (Germany)

20 July 2019
13:07

Ireland	19–14	Wales

Referee: Nikki O'donnell (England)

20 July 2019
15:30

Spain	12–14	Ireland

Referee: Maria Pacifico (Italy)

20 July 2019
15:52

Italy	26–0	Wales

Referee: Doriane Domenjo (France)

=== Knockout stage ===
==== 9th Place ====
Semi-finals
21 July 2019 – 12:28
Wales	26
Ukraine	12
21 July 2019 – 12:50
Spain	5
England	24

Ninth place
21 July 2019 – 16:40
Wales	12
Spain	22
Eleventh place
21 July 2019 – 16:18
Ukraine	7
England	36

==== 5th Place ====
Semi-finals
21 July 2019 – 14:15
Netherlands	0
Belgium	17
21 July 2019 – 14:37
Scotland	19
Italy	17

Fifth place
21 July 2019 – 17:24
Belgium	7
Scotland	36
Seventh place
21 July 2019 – 17:02
Netherlands	31
Italy	24

==== Cup ====
Quarter-finals
21 July 2019 – 11:00
France	19
Netherlands	14
21 July 2019 – 12:06
Belgium	7
Ireland	14
21 July 2019 – 11:22
Russia	22
Scotland	7
21 July 2019 – 11:44
Italy	14
Poland	17

Semi-finals
21 July 2019 – 14:59
France	34
Ireland	19
21 July 2019 – 15:21
Russia	32
Poland	0

Final
21 July 2019 – 18:11
France	5
Russia	12
Third place
21 July 2019 – 17:46
Ireland	14
Poland	45
