= 2013 in rugby union =

Here are the match results of the 2013 Rugby union season. Qualifiers for the 2015 Rugby World Cup, meanwhile the Six Nations Championship and The Rugby Championship are set for another season.

== International tournaments ==
- 2 February – 16 March: Six Nations Championship
  - Wales defended their RBS 6 Nations crown with a 30–3 victory against England. 26th title.
- May 17: Amlin Challenge Cup Final at RDS Arena, Dublin:
  - (Ireland) Leinster defeat (France) Stade Français 34–13 to claim the first Challenge Cup title for an Irish side.
- May 18: Heineken Cup Final at Aviva Stadium, Dublin:
  - (France) Toulon defeat (France) Clermont 16–15 to win their first European trophy.
- May 28 – June 9: 2013 IRB Junior World Rugby Trophy in Temuco, Chile
  - (gold) Italy, (silver) Canada, (bronze) Chile. Italy claim their second title and earn promotion to the 2014 IRB Junior World Championship.
- June 1 – July 6: British & Irish Lions tour to Australia
  - The Lions win the three-Test series against Australia 2–1. It is the Lions' first series win since defeating South Africa in 1997.
- June 5–23: 2013 IRB Junior World Championship in France
  - (gold) England, (silver) Wales, (bronze) South Africa. England win their first title. The United States finishes last and is relegated to the 2014 IRB Junior World Rugby Trophy.
- August 17 – October 5: The Rugby Championship
  - New Zealand sweep all six matches for the second consecutive year, maintaining their 100% record since the competition was expanded to include Argentina in 2012. Including the competition's previous history as the Tri Nations, it is the 10th title for the All Blacks.

== Rugby sevens ==
- IRB Sevens World Series:
  - (gold) New Zealand, (silver) South Africa, (bronze) Fiji. New Zealand claim their third consecutive series crown and 11th overall.
  - World Series Core Team Qualifier: Portugal, Scotland and Spain all retain their core team status for the 2013–14 series.
- IRB Women's Sevens World Series:
  - (gold) New Zealand, (silver) England, (bronze) Canada. New Zealand claim the inaugural series crown.
- June 28–30: 2013 Rugby World Cup Sevens in Moscow, Russia
  - Men's: (gold) New Zealand, (silver) England, (bronze) Fiji. New Zealand win their second title.
  - Women's: (gold) New Zealand, (silver) Canada, (bronze) United States. New Zealand win their first title.

== Domestic competitions ==
- (Japan) Top League Final, 27 January at Chichibunomiya Rugby Stadium, Tokyo:
  - Suntory Sungoliath defeat Toshiba Brave Lupus 19–3 to defend their title from last season. It is also Suntory's third league title overall.
- 15 February – 13 July: Super Rugby: The Chiefs top the regular-season table.
  - Super Rugby Final, August 3 at Waikato Stadium, Hamilton, New Zealand:
    - The Chiefs successfully defend their title from last season, defeating the (Australia) Brumbies 27–22. It is also the second Super Rugby title for the Chiefs.
  - In the (South Africa) South African promotion/relegation playoff, held over two legs on July 26 and August 3, the Lions defeat the Kings 44–42. The Lions will replace the Kings for the 2014 season.
- (England) English Premiership Final, May 25 at Twickenham, London:
  - Leicester Tigers defeat Northampton Saints 37–17 to claim their 10th Premiership crown.
- RFU Championship Final, May 23 and 30:
  - Newcastle Falcons defeat Bedford Blues 49–33 on aggregate in the two-legged final. As Newcastle were confirmed as meeting the Premiership's minimum standards, they replaced the Premiership's bottom club, London Welsh.
- Top 14 Final, June 1 at Stade de France, Saint-Denis:
  - Castres defeat Toulon 19–14 to claim their fourth title, and first since 1993.
- Rugby Pro D2:
  - Oyonnax automatically promoted to Top 14 as champion. Brive also earn promotion as winner of playoffs between the next four teams. They replaced the bottom two teams in Top 14, Agen and Mont-de-Marsan.
- (Ireland) (Italy) (Scotland) (Wales) Pro12 Final, May 25 at RDS Arena, Dublin:
  - (Ireland) Leinster, fresh off victory in the Amlin Challenge Cup, defeat (Ireland) Ulster 24–18 for their third Celtic League/Pro12 title.
- (England) (Wales) LV Cup (Anglo-Welsh Cup): (England) Harlequins
- ITM Cup
  - Premiership Final, October 26 at Westpac Stadium, Wellington: Canterbury defeat Wellington 29–13 to claim their sixth consecutive title in New Zealand's top level, and 11th overall.
  - Championship Final, October 25 at Trafalgar Park, Nelson: Tasman defeat Hawke's Bay 26–25 and are promoted to the 2014 ITM Premiership, replacing bottom-placed Bay of Plenty.
- (South Africa) Currie Cup Final, October 26 at Newlands, Cape Town:
  - The Sharks defeat Western Province 33–19 for their seventh Currie Cup crown.

== See also ==
- 2013 in sports
- Rugby union in 2009
