= 2021 Rugby Europe Women's Sevens Under 18 Trophy =

Women's rugby union

- Countries: Poland
- Number of teams: 7
- Champions: Poland
- Runners-up: Germany
- Matches played: 21

The 2021 Rugby Europe Women's Sevens Under 18 Trophy was held in Gdańsk, Poland, on the 16th and 17th of July. Seven teams competed in the tournament in a round-robin. Poland were undefeated and were crowned Champions. (Note: "Gdansk U18 7s Trophy Women - 2021". Rugby Europe. Archived from the original on 2022-07-03.)

== Tournament ==
Team	P	W	D	L	PF	PA	PD	Pts
Poland	6	6	0	0	235	27	208	18
Germany	6	5	0	1	178	32	146	16
Hungary	6	4	0	2	158	100	58	14
Turkey	6	3	0	3	54	135	-81	12
Sweden	6	2	0	4	109	129	-20	10
Latvia	6	1	0	5	36	184	-148	8
Lithuania	6	0	0	6	46	209	-163	6

16 July 2021 08:30, 10:30:00 (Local)

Germany	24 - 5	Hungary
	Report

Gdansk
Referee: (Georgia (country)) Ana POGOSYANI

16 July 2021 08:52, 10:52:00 (Local)

Poland	46 - 0	Turkey
	Report

Gdansk
Referee: (Switzerland) Aurélie LEMOUZY

16 July 2021 09:14, 11:14:00 (Local)

Sweden	31 - 5	Lithuania
	Report

Gdansk
Referee: (Romania) Loredana JUNCANARIU

16 July 2021 10:45, 12:45:00 (Local)

Germany	36 - 5	Turkey
	Report

Gdansk
Referee: (Croatia) Petra DRUSKOVIC

16 July 2021 11:07, 13:07:00 (Local)

Sweden	26 - 29	Hungary
	Report

Gdansk
Referee: (Georgia (country)) Ana POGOSYANI

16 July 2021 11:29, 13:29:00 (Local)

Poland	38 - 0	Latvia
	Report

Gdansk
Referee: (Switzerland) Aurélie LEMOUZY

16 July 2021 13:00, 15:00:00 (Local)

Hungary	38 - 7	Lithuania
	Report

Gdansk
Referee: (Romania) Loredana JUNCANARIU

16 July 2021 13:22, 15:22:00 (Local)

Germany	39 - 5	Latvia
	Report

Gdansk
Referee: (Croatia) Petra DRUSKOVIC

16 July 2021 13:44, 15:44:00 (Local)

Sweden	10 - 15	Turkey
	Report

Gdansk
Referee: (Georgia (country)) Ana POGOSYANI

16 July 2021 15:15, 17:15:00 (Local)

Latvia	26 - 17	Lithuania
	Report

Gdansk
Referee: (Switzerland) Aurélie LEMOUZY

16 July 2021 15:37, 17:37:00 (Local)

Turkey	0 - 26	Hungary
	Report

Gdansk

16 July 2021 15:59, 17:59:00 (Local)

Sweden	5 - 51	Poland
	Report

Gdansk
Referee: (Croatia) Petra DRUSKOVIC

17 July 2021 10:00, 12:00:00 (Local)

Latvia	0 - 15	Turkey
	Report

Gdansk
Referee: (Romania) Loredana JUNCANARIU

17 July 2021 10:22, 12:22:00 (Local)

Poland	38 - 17	Hungary
	Report

Gdansk
Referee: (Georgia (country)) Ana POGOSYANI

17 July 2021 10:44, 12:44:00 (Local)

Germany	45 - 0	Lithuania
	Report

Gdansk

17 July 2021 13:00, 15:00:00 (Local)

Turkey	19 - 17	Lithuania
	Report

Gdansk
Referee: (Switzerland) Aurélie LEMOUZY

17 July 2021 13:22, 15:22:00 (Local)

Germany	5 - 12	Poland
	Report

Gdansk

17 July 2021 13:44, 15:44:00 (Local)

Sweden	32 - 0	Latvia
	Report

Gdansk

17 July 2021 15:34, 17:34:00 (Local)

Latvia	5 - 43	Hungary
	Report

Gdansk

17 July 2021 15:56, 17:56:00 (Local)

Poland	50 - 0	Lithuania
	Report

Gdansk

17 July 2021 16:18, 18:18:00 (Local)

Sweden	5 - 29	Germany
	Report

Gdansk

== Squads ==
Sweden	Germany	Hungary	Poland	Turkey
1. Maud Ringertz; 2. Molly Melin; 3. Angel Nera Mortensen; 4. Rebecka Hillelson; 5. Sonia Smolina; 6. Emelie Xiong Selldén; 7. Madeleine Jansson; 8. Tess Proos; 9. Johanna Dahlén; 10. Emilija Miftari; 11. Sofie Svanfeldt	1. Mia Barbu; 2. Miriam Knoblauch; 3. Paula Schult; 4. Clara Tauschek; 5. Lara Bürger; 6. Joy Weatherspoon; 7. Lotte Marquardt; 8. Gina Soell; 9. Hanna Mauligalo; 10. Ieva Ziffels; 11. Corinna Schmid; 12. Greta Pfaffmann	1. Dorottya Olah; 2. Julia Laszlo; 3. Szofia Tisch; 4. Adriana Anna Jonas; 5. Eszter Boda; 6. Sara Borbala Solt; 7. Virag Volgyi; 8. Kata Takacs; 9. Hanna Keresztesi; 10. Boglarka Vigh; 11. Greta Lencses; 12. Emese Eva Salamon	1. Klaudia Starowicz; 2. Aleksandra Sulisz; 3. Katarzyna Wodarka; 4. Oliwia Rawecka; 5. Marta Morus; 6. Nela Wójcik; 7. Jagoda Szafaryn; 8. Natalia Szynawa; 9. Laura Uroda; 10. Julia Druzgala; 11. Julia Sadowska; 12. Karolina Stokowska	1. Asude Yilmaz; 2. Gamze Gulec; 3. Nurten Oney; 4. Ayca Akcinar; 5. E. Bilge Yalcinkaya; 6. Hilal Doguz; 7. Sefika Nur Onal; 8. Aysenur Yilmaz; 9. Beyza Dag; 10. Gurbet Turan; 11. Hilal Gunduz; 12. Tugce Ersoy
Coach: Joss Linney	Coach: Ines Navarro			Coach: Yigitcan Gursen
Lithuania	Latvia
1. Igne Griciute; 2. Austeja Lingyte; 3. Samira Dzamilovaite; 4. Germante Misiulyte; 5. Daniele Misiulyte; 6. Kamile Radzeviciute; 7. Evelina Sileikaite; 8. Karolina Ekelyte; 9. Austeja Radionovaite; 10. Vaineikyte Kotryna; 11. Jogile Gudaityte; 12. Gabija Jacunskaite	1. Zaklina Maksimova; 2. Alise Zirnite; 3. Evelina Roze Puja; 4. Justine Sauka; 5. Marta Pukite; 6. Enija Mezale; 7. Agnese Iljina; 8. Daniela Rusecka; 9. Marika Pluskevica; 10. Julija Kobilinska; 11. Viktorija Sigutenkova; 12. Vanessa Baldina
Coach: Vytaras Bloskys	Coach: Roberts Bondarenko
