= IRB Women's Sevens Challenge Cup =

Series of rugby tournaments

- Sport: Rugby sevens
- Founded: 2011
- Folded: 2012
- Replaced by: World Rugby Women's Sevens Series
- No. of teams: 12
- Country: Worldwide
- Last champion: England

The IRB Women's Sevens Challenge Cup was a series of three tournaments run by the International Rugby Board for women's rugby sevens held for the 2011-12 season. England finished as the holders of the Cup and won two of the three tournaments.

The first Challenge Cup tournament was held alongside the 2011 Dubai Sevens. Canada defeated England in the final to win the Cup. The second tournament was in Hong Kong, held alongside the 2012 Hong Kong Sevens on 23–24 March, with England claiming the Cup.

England hosted the IRB Women's Sevens Challenge Cup alongside the London Sevens on 12–13 May for the third tournament in the series. The host nation retained the Cup, defeating the Netherlands in the final.

The Challenge Cup series was expanded into the IRB Women's Sevens World Series for the 2012-13 season.

== Tournament results ==
Year	Host	Cup Final		
Year	Host	Winner	Score	Runner-up
2011	United Arab Emirates	Canada	26–7	England
2012	Hong Kong	England	15–10	Australia
2012	England	England	34–7	Netherlands

== See also ==
- Rugby World Cup Sevens
