= 2013 Rugby World Cup Sevens =

International rugby event

Семерки чемпионата мира по регби-2013

Tournament details
- Host nation: Russia
- Venue: Luzhniki Stadium; Gorodok Stadium
- Dates: 28 – 30 June 2013
- No. of nations: 24 (men); 16 (women)

Final positions
- Champions: New Zealand (men); New Zealand (women)

The 2013 Rugby World Cup Sevens was the sixth edition of the Rugby World Cup Sevens. The tournament was held at Luzhniki Stadium in Moscow, Russia. New Zealand won the tournament, defeating England 33–0 in the final. Attendance for the tournament was poor, with matches played in mostly empty stadiums.

World Rugby, then known as the International Rugby Board (IRB), initially stated that the Rugby World Cup Sevens would be scrapped if rugby sevens were to be included in the Olympic programme for the 2016 Summer Olympics. As the International Olympic Committee voted for the sport's inclusion, this was thought likely to be the last edition of the tournament. However, the IRB clarified that in June 2013, the tournament would be retained and held quadrennially from 2018.

== Hosting ==
In December 2009, the IRB confirmed that the governing rugby boards of Brazil (Brazilian Rugby Association), Germany (German Rugby Federation) and Russia (Rugby Union of Russia) formally expressed their intention to tender to host the tournament. Scottish Rugby Union, the governing rugby board of Scotland, which did not choose to express interest, was also previously considering bidding for the tournament.

In February 2010, the IRB reported that Rugby Union of Russia had formally submitted its tender for the right to host Rugby World Cup Sevens 2013, while the Brazilian and German rugby boards had confirmed their withdrawal from the bidding process. This announcement left Russia as the only country bidding to host the event.

"This tender submission underlines our continued commitment to ignite a new Rugby frontier in Russia through a strategic vision of promotion, participation and growth."

—Vyacheslav Kopiev, President of Rugby Union of Russia

Six days before hosting the 2010 IRB Junior World Rugby Trophy, Russia was officially named as host at the IRB annual congress on 12 May 2010.

== Qualification ==
Men's

Region	Automatic Qualifiers	Places Remaining
Africa	Kenya; South Africa	2
North America/Caribbean	No Automatic Qualifiers	2
South America	Argentina	1
Asia	No Automatic Qualifiers	3
Europe	England; Wales; Russia	5
Oceania	Fiji; New Zealand; Samoa	2

Women's

Region	Automatic Qualifiers	Places Remaining
Africa	South Africa	1
North America/Caribbean	United States	1
South America	No Automatic Qualifiers	1
Asia	No Automatic Qualifiers	2.5*
Europe	Russia	5
Oceania	Australia; New Zealand	0.5*

* Winner of Oceania qualifier will compete in Asian qualifier.

Notes (Men's):
Canada and United States qualified for the tournament taking the 2 available places in the North America/Caribbean category.
Zimbabwe and Tunisia qualified for the tournament taking the 2 available places in the Africa category.
Australia and Tonga qualified for the tournament taking the 2 available places in the Oceania category.
Portugal, Spain, France, Georgia and Scotland qualified for the tournament taking the 5 available places in the Europe category.
Japan, Hong Kong and Philippines qualified for the tournament taking the 3 available places in the Asia category.
Uruguay qualified for the tournament taking the 1 and only place available in the South America category.

Notes (Women's):
Canada qualified for the tournament through NACRA's regional qualifying tournament taking the 1 and only place available in the North America/Caribbean category.
Tunisia qualified for the tournament taking the 1 available place in the Africa category.
England, Ireland, Spain, France and Netherlands qualified for the tournament taking the 5 available places in the European category.
Fiji, Japan, and China qualified for the tournament through AFRU's regional qualifying tournament taking the 3 available places in the Asian and Oceania category.
Brazil qualified through CONSUR's regional qualifying tournament taking the 1 and only place in the South America category.

=== Qualified teams ===
Men

Africa	North America/ Caribbean	South America	Asia	Europe	Oceania
Automatic qualification
Kenya; South Africa		Argentina		England; Russia (Hosts); Wales (Holders)	Fiji; New Zealand; Samoa
Regional Qualifiers
Tunisia; Zimbabwe	Canada; United States	Uruguay	Hong Kong; Japan; Philippines	France; Georgia; Portugal; Scotland; Spain	Australia; Tonga

Women

Africa	North America/ Caribbean	South America	Asia	Europe	Oceania
Automatic qualification
South Africa	United States			Russia (Hosts)	Australia (Holders); New Zealand
Regional Qualifiers
Tunisia	Canada	Brazil	China; Japan	England; France; Ireland; Netherlands; Spain	Fiji

== Trophy Overview ==
Trophy Overview
	Men		Women	
	Champions	Runner-up	Champions	Runner-up
Cup	New Zealand	England	New Zealand	Canada
Plate	Canada	Samoa	Australia	England
Bowl	Russia	Japan	Fiji	Netherlands
