= Ukraine women's national rugby sevens team =

Ukraine
- Union: National Rugby Federation of Ukraine
- Coach: Viacheslav Kozmenko
Team kit

The Ukraine women's sevens team competes in the European Women's Sevens Championship and occasionally in other competitions. Ukraine were runners-up at the 2018 Rugby Europe Women's Sevens Trophy and were promoted to the Grand Prix Series for 2019.

== Current squad ==
Squad to European Women's Sevens Series: June 23–24, 2018 at Dnipro, Ukraine

| Player | City |
|---|---|
| Mariia Rashchuk | Kyiv |
| Alice Ulyankina | Kyiv |
| Nataliia Mazur | Kyiv |
| Oksana Nikoryak | Kyiv |
| Maryna Borodina | Odesa |
| Anastasiia Bardyka | Odesa |
| Olena Chebotar | Odesa |
| Tetiana Tarasiuk | Odesa |
| Anna Zhygunova | Odesa |
| Oksana Pasichko | Odesa |
| Olga Surkova | Odesa |
| Yuliia Ivashchnko | Kharkiv |
