= Wales women's national rugby sevens team =

Wales
- Union: Welsh Rugby Union
- Emblem: The Prince of Wales's feathers
- Coach: Rhys Edwards
- Captain: Rachel Taylor
Team kit	Change kit

The Wales Women's National Sevens Team represents Wales in Rugby sevens.

== History ==
In 2006 Wales won the European Women Sevens Championship after beating England 10–7 in the final.

In 2012 they competed in round 2 of the European Women's Sevens Series which also acted as a qualifier for the 2013 Rugby World Cup Sevens. They failed to qualify after finishing in 11th place overall.

Wales finished in fifth place at the 2017 Europe Sevens Grand Prix Series and qualified for the 2018 Commonwealth Games in Australia. They defeated South Africa 19–14 in the seventh place playoff.

== Squad ==
Squad to 2013 Rugby World Cup Sevens Final Qualifier

- Caryl James
- Elinor Snowsill
- Elen Evans
- Rachel Rees
- Jade Phillips (Knight)
- Nia Davies
- Laurie Harries
- Rachel Taylor
- Delyth Davies
- Charlotte Murray
- Sian Williams
- Rebecca De Filippo

== Tournament history ==
=== Commonwealth Games record ===
Commonwealth Games
Year	Round	Position	Pld	W	L	D
(Australia) 2018	7th Place Playoff	7th	5	1	4	0
(England) 2022	Did not Qualify					
Total	0 Titles	1/1	5	1	4	0
