= Belgium women's national rugby sevens team =

Belgium
- Union: Belgian Rugby Federation
- Nickname: Belsevens
- Coach: Emiel Vermote
- Captain: Cécile Blondiau
Team kit

World Cup
- Appearances: 0

The Belgium women's national rugby sevens team are a national sporting side of Belgium, representing them at Rugby sevens.

== Tournament History ==
Belgium won the 2013 FIRA-AER Women's Sevens – Division A and were promoted to the Grand Prix Series. In the 2014 Rugby Europe Women's Sevens Grand Prix Series they placed 10th in both tournaments in Moscow and Brive and finally eleventh overall. They were relegated to the Trophy division for 2015, they became champions once again and were promoted to the Grand Prix Series for 2016.

Belgium placed 6th overall in the 2016 Grand Prix Series and qualified for a spot at the 2017 Hong Kong Women's Sevens, which acted as a qualifier for the 2017–18 World Rugby Women's Sevens Series. Had they won, they would have earned "core team" status.

Belgium qualified for the 2024 Sevens Challenger Series, they were part of the three highest-ranked teams in the European Sevens Championship Series in 2023. They placed fifth in the first round of the series which took place in Dubai. They topped their pool but lost to Uganda in the Cup quarter-final.

They finished third overall at the 2024 Sevens Challenger Series and secured their place at the new SVNS Play-off promotion and relegation competition in Madrid.

== Players ==
Belgium's squad to the 2024 World Rugby Sevens Challenger Series:

Players
Margaux Lalli
Margaux Stevins
Emilie Musch
Cecile Blondiau
Nele Pien
Pauline Gernaey
Femke Soens
Shari Claes
Hanne Swiers
Noemie van de Poele
Louise Liegeois
Ambre Collet
