= Netherlands women's national rugby sevens team =

Netherlands
- Union: Dutch Rugby Union
- Coach: Chris Lane
- Captain: Anne Hielckert
Team kit

World Cup Sevens
- Appearances: 2 (First in 2009)
- Best result: 10th place, 2013

The Netherlands women's national rugby sevens team participated in the IRB Women's Sevens Challenge Cup in Hong Kong losing to Spain in the Plate semi-finals, they finished 8th overall. In October 2012, the Netherlands was announced by the International Rugby Board as one of six "core teams" that competed in all four rounds of the inaugural IRB Women's Sevens World Series in 2012–13. The team finished seventh in the standings. It was later decided that the quarter-finalists at the 2013 Rugby World Cup Sevens would make up the eight core teams for the next series later that year.

== History ==
In the 2013–14 IRB Women's Sevens World Series they competed in only three tournaments, with a best results of 8th at São Paulo. The 2014–15 World Rugby Women's Sevens Series would double as an Olympics qualifier for Rio 2016. The Netherlands were not invited to any tournament, apart from the 2015 Netherlands Women's Sevens where they finished 11th. They missed their chances of any Olympic qualification after losing at the 2015 Rugby Europe Women's Sevens and the 2015 Rugby Europe Women's Sevens Olympic Repechage Tournament.

Netherlands won the 2018 Rugby Europe Women's Sevens Trophy and were promoted to the Grand Prix Series for 2019.

== Tournament History ==
=== Rugby World Cup Sevens ===
Rugby World Cup Sevens
Year	Round	Position	Pld	W	L	D
(United Arab Emirates) 2009	Bowl Quarterfinalists	13th	4	1	3	0
(Russia) 2013	Bowl Finalists	10th	6	3	3	0
(United States) 2018	Did not qualify					
Total	0 Titles	2/3	10	4	6	0

=== 2012 Hong Kong Sevens ===
Pool C

Nation	Won	Drawn	Lost	For	Against
Australia	2	0	0	80	21
Netherlands	1	0	1	40	33
Hong Kong	0	0	2	5	71

- Australia 28-21 Netherlands
- Netherlands 19-5 Hong Kong

Finals

Plate semi finals

- Netherlands 0-14 Spain

7th/8th

- Russia 5-0 Netherlands

== Players ==
=== Previous squads ===
Squad to IRB Women's Sevens Challenge Cup - 2012 London Sevens

- Linda Frannssen (c)
- Mara Moberg
- Dorien Eppink
- Inge Visser
- Joyce van Altena
- Anne Hielckert
- Lorraine Laros
- Annemarije van Rossum
- Pien Selbeck
- Kelly van Harskamp
- Yale Belder
- Alexia Mavroudis

=== Award winners ===
The following Netherlands Sevens players have been recognised at the World Rugby Awards since 2013:

World Rugby Women's 7s Player of the Year
Year	Nominees	Winners
2013	Kelly van Harskamp	—
