= Portugal women's national rugby sevens team =

Portugal
- Union: Portuguese Rugby Federation
Team kit

World Cup Sevens
- Appearances: 0

The Portugal women's national rugby sevens team finished at 10th place at the IRB Women's Sevens Challenge Cup held in London, losing to China in the Bowl final.

The team qualified to the 2016 Final Olympic Qualification Tournament.

== Squad ==
Squad to IRB Women's Sevens Challenge Cup - 2012 London Sevens:

- Joana Borlido
- Raquel Freitas
- Marta Moreira
- Carlota Gouveia
- Daniela Correia
- Joana Amorim
- Marta Ferreira
- Isabel Ozorio
- Leonor Amaral
- Joana Vieira
- Catarina Antunes
- Cátia João

== 2012 IRB Challenge: London Sevens ==
Group B

Nation	Won	Drawn	Lost	For	Against
Netherlands	3	0	0	58	19
Canada	2	0	1	97	15
Russia	1	0	2	19	58
Portugal	0	0	3	15	97

- Canada 14 - 15 Netherlands
- Russia 19 - 10 Portugal
- Canada 54 - 0 Portugal
- Russia 0 - 19 Netherlands
- Canada 29-0 Russia
- Portugal 5 - 24 Netherlands

Bowl Semi Finals (9th-12th)

- Kazakhstan 10 - 26 Portugal
- Brazil 14 - 33 China

Bowl final:9th/10th Match

- Portugal 5 - 43 China
