= Germany women's national rugby sevens team =

National women's rugby sevens team

Germany
- Union: German Rugby Federation
- Coach: Melvine Smith
Team kit

World Cup Sevens
- Appearances: 0

Germany Women's National Rugby Sevens Team is a minor national sevens side.

== History ==
In 2012 former national coach Susanne Wiedemann convinced the German Rugby Union, the German Olympic Sports Confederation and the German Army to contract four female rugby sevens players in preparation for the 2016 Rio Olympics. Jenny Naruhn, Svetlana Hess, Tilla Dier and Lisa Kropp became the first "sport soldiers" in the Army, which provides high-performance development for a select few male and female athletes from different sports. They undergo basic training, followed by a few military courses annually, while getting paid to train for their sport.

All sport soldiers were based in the Olympic Centre in Cologne from 2012. In addition to the full-time players, other national players were invited to move to the area to attend daily rugby and fitness sessions. The Olympic Centre works in conjunction with the Cologne Sport University. The number of contracted players increased to eight in 2013, with Steffi Gruber, Laryssa Stone, Alysha Stone, Julia Peters, and Vivian Bahlmann joining Hess, Kropp, and Nahrun.

Despite these efforts, the results of the women in the European Championship tournaments deteriorated, with the team failing to even to place under the top eight teams in Europe in 2015. Weidemann resigned and was replaced by Australian Michael Hooke, while South African Melvine Smith became the U18 coach. The sports soldiers lost their Army contracts. But Smith managed to build on Weidemann's past work to take the U18 squad to a third place in the 2nd European Sevens Championships.

== Players ==
=== Previous squads ===
Squad to 2017 Rugby Europe Women's Sevens (Trophy) in Ostrava and Esztergom

- Head coach: Melvine Smith
- Players: Lisa Bohrmann · Katharina Epp · Nora Baltruweit · Annika Nowotny · Steffi Gruber (Cap.) · Mette Zimmat · Julia Braun · Anja Czaika · Katharina Boie · Julia Peters · Carola Gleixner · Leonie Hollstein · Friederike Kempter · Sarah Titgemeyer

Squad to 2012 European Women's Sevens Series: June 16–17, 2012 at Ameland, Netherlands

- Head coach: Susanne Wiedemann
- Players: Alysha Stone · Seyma Ünlü · Svetlana Hess · Dana Kleine-Grefe · Lisa Kropp · Laryssa Stone · Jana Eisenbeiß · Lisa Bohrmann · Jenny Naruhn · Julia Peters · Steffi Gruber · Rafica Schneider

== See also ==
- Rugby union in Germany
