= Rugby sevens at the 2023 European Games – Women's tournament =

Tournament details
- Host: Poland
- Venue: Stadion Miejski im. Henryka Reymana
- Date: 25–27 June
- Teams: 12

Final positions
- Champions: Great Britain (1st title)
- Runner-up: Poland
- Third place: Czech Republic
- Fourth place: Belgium

Tournament statistics
- Matches played: 34
- Tries scored: 212 (6.24 per match)
- Top scorer(s): (Czech Republic) Julie Doležilová (55 points)
- Most tries: (Poland) Małgorzata Kołdej (8 tries)

The women's rugby sevens tournament at the 2023 European Games was held from 25 to 27 June at the Stadion Miejski im. Henryka Reymana in Kraków.

== Seeding ==
Teams were seeded following the serpentine system according to results of first leg of the 2023 Rugby Europe Women's Sevens Championship Series and 2023 Rugby Europe Women's Sevens Trophy.

Pool A	Pool B	Pool C
Great Britain (2^{CS})	Poland (4^{CS})	Spain (5^{CS})
Czechia (8^{CS})	Germany (7^{CS})	Belgium (6^{CS})
Italy (9^{CS})	Portugal (10^{CS})	Sweden (11^{CS})
Norway (11^{TR})	Turkey (2^{TR})	Romania (12^{CS})

== Pool stage ==
All times are local (UTC+2).

=== Pool A ===
Pos	Team	Pld	W	D	L	PF	PA	PD	Pts	Qualification
1	Great Britain	3	3	0	0	128	10	+118	9	Quarterfinals
2	Czechia	3	2	0	1	64	42	+22	7	Quarterfinals
3	Italy	3	1	0	2	67	64	+3	5	Quarterfinals
4	Norway	3	0	0	3	0	143	−143	3	

Source: EG2023
Rules for classification: 1) points; 2) head-to-head points; 3) head-to-head goal difference; 4) head-to-head number of goals scored; 5) goal difference.

25 June
10:44

Czechia	28–5	Italy
	Report

Stadion Miejski im. Henryka Reymana, Kraków

25 June
11:06

Great Britain	55–0	Norway
	Report

Stadion Miejski im. Henryka Reymana, Kraków

25 June
16:44

Czechia	31–0	Norway
	Report

Stadion Miejski im. Henryka Reymana, Kraków

25 June
17:06

Great Britain	36–5	Italy
	Report

Stadion Miejski im. Henryka Reymana, Kraków

26 June
10:44

Italy	57–0	Norway
	Report

Stadion Miejski im. Henryka Reymana, Kraków

26 June
11:06

Great Britain	37–5	Czechia
	Report

Stadion Miejski im. Henryka Reymana, Kraków

=== Pool B ===
Pos	Team	Pld	W	D	L	PF	PA	PD	Pts	Qualification
1	Poland (H)	3	3	0	0	119	7	+112	9	Quarterfinals
2	Portugal	3	2	0	1	55	48	+7	7	Quarterfinals
3	Germany	3	1	0	2	55	67	−12	5	Quarterfinals
4	Turkey	3	0	0	3	10	117	−107	3	

Source: EG2023
Rules for classification: 1) points; 2) head-to-head points; 3) head-to-head goal difference; 4) head-to-head number of goals scored; 5) goal difference.
(H) Hosts

25 June
11:28

Germany	17–19	Portugal
	Report

Stadion Miejski im. Henryka Reymana, Kraków

25 June
11:50

Poland	50–0	Turkey
	Report

Stadion Miejski im. Henryka Reymana, Kraków

25 June
17:28

Germany	31–5	Turkey
	Report

Stadion Miejski im. Henryka Reymana, Kraków

25 June
17:50

Poland	26–0	Portugal
	Report

Stadion Miejski im. Henryka Reymana, Kraków

26 June
11:28

Portugal	36–5	Turkey
	Report

Stadion Miejski im. Henryka Reymana, Kraków

26 June
11:50

Poland	43–7	Germany
	Report

Stadion Miejski im. Henryka Reymana, Kraków

=== Pool C ===
Pos	Team	Pld	W	D	L	PF	PA	PD	Pts	Qualification
1	Spain	3	3	0	0	106	7	+99	9	Quarterfinals
2	Belgium	3	2	0	1	86	29	+57	7	Quarterfinals
3	Romania	3	1	0	2	19	92	−73	5	
4	Sweden	3	0	0	3	12	95	−83	3	

Source: EG2023
Rules for classification: 1) points; 2) head-to-head points; 3) head-to-head goal difference; 4) head-to-head number of goals scored; 5) goal difference.

25 June
10:00

Belgium	40–0	Sweden
	Report

Stadion Miejski im. Henryka Reymana, Kraków

25 June
10:22

Spain	41–0	Romania
	Report

Stadion Miejski im. Henryka Reymana, Kraków

25 June
16:00

Belgium	39–0	Romania
	Report

Stadion Miejski im. Henryka Reymana, Kraków

25 June
16:22

Spain	36–0	Sweden
	Report

Stadion Miejski im. Henryka Reymana, Kraków

26 June
10:00

Sweden	12–19	Romania
	Report

Stadion Miejski im. Henryka Reymana, Kraków

26 June
10:22

Spain	29–7	Belgium
	Report

Stadion Miejski im. Henryka Reymana, Kraków

=== Ranking of third-placed teams ===
The top two of the third-placed teams advance to the knockout rounds.

Pos	Grp	Team	Pld	W	D	L	PF	PA	PD	Pts	Qualification
1	A	Italy	3	1	0	2	67	64	+3	5	Quarterfinals
2	B	Germany	3	1	0	2	55	67	−12	5	Quarterfinals
3	C	Romania	3	1	0	2	19	92	−73	5	

Source: EG2023
Rules for classification: 1) Points; 2) Point difference; 3) Points scored.

== Knockout stage ==
=== 9–12th place playoff ===
9–12th place semifinals
26 June
Romania	33
Norway	0
26 June
Sweden	10
Turkey	7

Ninth place match
27 June
Romania	5
Sweden	25
Eleventh place match
27 June
Norway	10
Turkey	5

26 June
16:00

Romania	33–0	Norway
	Report

Stadion Miejski im. Henryka Reymana, Kraków

26 June
16:22

Sweden	10–7	Turkey
	Report

Stadion Miejski im. Henryka Reymana, Kraków

27 June
10:00

Norway	10–5	Turkey
	Report

Stadion Miejski im. Henryka Reymana, Kraków

27 June
10:22

Romania	5–25	Sweden
	Report

Stadion Miejski im. Henryka Reymana, Kraków

=== 5–8th place playoff ===
5–8th place semifinals
27 June
Germany	22
Portugal	7
27 June
Italy	0
Spain	38

Fifth place match
27 June
Germany	5
Spain	26
Seventh place match
27 June
Portugal	7
Italy	34

27 June
10:44

Germany	22–7	Portugal
	Report

Stadion Miejski im. Henryka Reymana, Kraków

27 June
11:06

Italy	0–38	Spain
	Report

Stadion Miejski im. Henryka Reymana, Kraków

27 June
18:45

Portugal	7–34	Italy
	Report

Stadion Miejski im. Henryka Reymana, Kraków

27 June
19:29

Germany	5–26	Spain
	Report

Stadion Miejski im. Henryka Reymana, Kraków

=== Medal playoff ===
Quarterfinals
26 June
Great Britain	53
Germany	0
26 June
Portugal	5
Belgium	22
26 June
Poland	33
Italy	15
26 June
Spain	12
Czechia	17

Semifinals
27 June
Great Britain	36
Belgium	12
27 June
Poland	29
Czechia	7

Gold medal match
27 June
Great Britain	33
Poland	0
Bronze medal match
27 June
Belgium	17
Czechia	24

==== Quarterfinals ====
26 June
16:44

Great Britain	53–0	Germany
Try: Joyce (2) 1' c, 7' c Boatman (3) 2' m, 4' c, 14' m Thomson 5' c Torley 8' m Lloyd 10' m Jones 12' m Con: Thomson (4/5) 1', 4', 6', 7+1'; Jones (0/4)	Report

Stadion Miejski im. Henryka Reymana, Kraków
Referee: Eki Fanlo (Spain)

26 June
17:06

Poland	33–15	Italy
Try: Kołdej (2) 3' c, 8' c Pamięta (2) 5' c, 7+2' m Schuster 11' c Con: Pamięta (4/5) 4', 6', 9', 12'	Report	Try: Locatelli (2) 7' m, 14' m Stefan 13' m Con: Rigoni (0/1); Stefan (0/1); Paganini (0/1)

Stadion Miejski im. Henryka Reymana, Kraków
Referee: George Selwood (England)

26 June
17:28

Spain	12–17	Czechia
Try: López 2' m Domínguez 14+1' c Con: López (1/2) 14+1'	Report	Try: Riegertová (2) 4' c, 5' m Doležilová 7+1' m Con: Doležilová (1/3) 4'; Cards: Vacková (yellow card) 14+1'

Stadion Miejski im. Henryka Reymana, Kraków
Referee: Maria Latos (Germany)

26 June
17:50

Portugal	5–22	Belgium
Try: Santos 14+2' m Con: Marques (0/1)	Report	Try: Blondiau 7' m Van de Poele (2) 7+1' m, 8' c Pien 11' m Con: Pien (1/3) 9'; Stévins (0/1)

Stadion Miejski im. Henryka Reymana, Kraków
Referee: Lauren Jenner (Italy)

==== Semifinals ====
27 June
12:15

Great Britain	36–12	Belgium
Try: Jones 3' m Campbell (2) 7' c, 13' m Uren 8' c Brown 11' c Norman-Bell 14+1' m Con: Jones (2/4) 8', 11'; Thomson (1/1) 7+1'; Norman-Bell (0/1)	Report	Try: Blondiau 2' m Lalli 6' c Con: Amory (0/1); Pien (1/1) 6'

Stadion Miejski im. Henryka Reymana, Kraków
Referee: Lauren Jenner (Italy)

27 June
13:10

Poland	29–7	Czechia
Try: Kołdej 3' m Klichowska (2) 4' m, 14' c Witkowska (2) 6' m, 13' c Con: Pamięta (1/4) 13'; Druzgała (1/1) 14'	Report	Try: Sládková 7' c Con: Doležilová (1/1) 7+1'

Stadion Miejski im. Henryka Reymana, Kraków
Referee: George Selwood (England)

==== Bronze medal match ====
27 June
20:13

Belgium	17–24	Czechia
Try: Musch 4' c Blondiau (2) 14' m, 14+1' m Con: Stevens (1/1) 4'; Amory (0/2)	Report	Try: Sládková 2' m Doležilová 7' c Riegertová (2) 9' c, 12 m Con: Doležilová (2/4) 7+1', 10'

Stadion Miejski im. Henryka Reymana, Kraków
Referee: George Selwood (England)

==== Gold medal match ====
27 June
21:05

Great Britain	33–0	Poland
Try: Uren (2) 3' c, 7' c Jones 7+1' m Lloyd 11' c Wilson-Hardy 12' c Con: Norman-Bell (1/2) 3'; Jones (3/3) 7', 11', 13'	Report	Cards: Paszczyk (yellow card) 11'

Stadion Miejski im. Henryka Reymana, Kraków
Referee: Lauren Jenner (Italy)

== Final standings ==
Rank	Team	Matches	W	D	L	Points	Tries
1st place, gold medalist(s)	Great Britain	6	6	0	0	250	42
2nd place, silver medalist(s)	Poland	6	5	0	1	181	29
3rd place, bronze medalist(s)	Czechia	6	4	0	2	112	18
4	Belgium	6	3	0	3	137	23
5	Spain	6	5	0	1	182	30
6	Germany	6	2	0	4	82	14
7	Italy	6	2	0	4	116	20
8	Portugal	6	2	0	4	74	12
9	Sweden	5	2	0	3	47	9
10	Romania	5	2	0	3	57	9
11	Norway	5	1	0	4	10	2
12	Turkey	5	0	0	5	22	4

== See also ==
- Rugby sevens at the 2023 European Games – Men's tournament
