= 2016 Rugby Europe Women's Sevens Trophy =

- Hosts: Czech Republic; Hungary
- Nations: 12

Final positions
- Champions: Sweden
- Runners-up: Poland

The 2016 Rugby Europe Women's Sevens Trophy was the second level of international women's rugby sevens competitions organised by Rugby Europe during 2016. The competition featured two tournaments, one hosted in Prague and one hosted in Esztergom. Sweden won both tournaments. Sweden and Poland were promoted to the 2017 Grand Prix series while Norway and Denmark were relegated to the 2017 Conferences.

== Tournament 1 (Prague) ==
Prague Tournament
- Host nation: Czech Republic
- Date: 18–19 June 2016

Cup
- Champion: Sweden
- Runner-up: Scotland
- Third: Poland

Plate
- Winner: Romania
- Runner-up: Switzerland

Bowl
- Winner: Moldova
- Runner-up: Israel

=== Pool stage ===
==== Pool A ====
Teams	Pld	W	D	L	PF	PA	+/−	Pts
Scotland	3	3	0	0	99	17	+82	9
Switzerland	3	2	0	1	62	67	-5	7
Czech Republic	3	1	0	2	39	48	-9	5
Israel	3	0	0	3	20	88	-68	3

Matches

18 June 2016

Scotland	33-10	Israel

18 June 2016

Switzerland	29-10	Czech Republic

18 June 2016

Switzerland	26-10	Israel

18 June 2016

Scotland	19-0	Czech Republic

18 June 2016

Scotland	47-7	Switzerland

18 June 2016

Czech Republic	29-0	Israel

==== Pool B ====
Teams	Pld	W	D	L	PF	PA	+/−	Pts
Poland	3	3	0	0	95	29	+66	9
Germany	3	2	0	1	79	31	+48	7
Denmark	3	1	0	2	26	100	-74	5
Norway	3	0	0	3	34	74	-40	3

Matches

18 June 2016

Germany	38-7	Denmark

18 June 2016

Poland	31-12	Norway

18 June 2016

Germany	24-5	Norway

18 June 2016

Poland	45-0	Denmark

18 June 2016

Germany	17-19	Poland

18 June 2016

Norway	17-19	Denmark

==== Pool C ====
Teams	Pld	W	D	L	PF	PA	+/−	Pts
Sweden	3	2	0	1	56	24	+32	7
Romania	3	2	0	1	55	25	+30	7
Hungary	3	2	0	1	44	48	-4	7
Moldova	0	0	0	3	22	80	-58	3

Matches

18 June 2016

Sweden	34-0	Moldova

18 June 2016

Romania	24-5	Hungary

18 June 2016

Sweden	12-17	Hungary

18 June 2016

Romania	24-10	Moldova

18 June 2016

Sweden	10-7	Romania

18 June 2016

Hungary	22-12	Moldova

=== Knockout stage ===
==== Bowl ====
Semi-finals
19 June 2016
Denmark	5
Israel	10
19 June 2016
Norway	5
Moldova	10

Final
19 June 2016
Israel	0
Moldova	14
Third place
19 June 2016
Denmark	22
Norway	26

==== Plate ====
Quarter-finals
19 June 2016
Scotland	24
Czech Republic	5
19 June 2016
Germany	22
Romania	0
19 June 2016
Poland	26
Hungary	10
19 June 2016
Sweden	21
Switzerland	7

Semi-finals
19 June 2016
Czech Republic	0
Romania	5
19 June 2016
Hungary	12
Switzerland	22

Final
19 June 2016
Romania	19
Switzerland	5
Third place
19 June 2016
Czech Republic	10
Hungary	21

==== Cup ====
Quarter-finals
19 June 2016
Scotland	24
Czech Republic	5
19 June 2016
Germany	22
Romania	0
19 June 2016
Poland	26
Hungary	10
19 June 2016
Sweden	21
Switzerland	7

Semi-finals
19 June 2016
Scotland	17
Germany	12
19 June 2016
Poland	0
Sweden	29

Final
19 June 2016
Scotland	15
Sweden	34
Third place
19 June 2016
Germany	5
Poland	12

== Tournament 2 (Esztergom) ==
Esztergom Tournament
- Host nation: Hungary
- Date: 9–10 July 2016

Cup
- Champion: Sweden
- Runner-up: Poland
- Third: Germany

Plate
- Winner: Hungary
- Runner-up: Romania

Bowl
- Winner: Czech Republic
- Runner-up: Moldova

=== Pool stage ===
==== Pool A ====
Teams	Pld	W	D	L	PF	PA	+/−	Pts
Poland	3	3	0	0	74	17	+57	9
Germany	3	2	0	1	44	26	+18	7
Israel	3	1	0	2	26	60	-34	5
Moldova	3	0	0	3	14	55	-41	3

Matches

9 July 2016

Poland	36-7	Israel

9 July 2016

Germany	17-7	Moldova

9 July 2016

Poland	26-0	Moldova

9 July 2016

Germany	17-7	Israel

9 July 2016

Poland	12-10	Germany

9 July 2016

Moldova	7-12	Israel

==== Pool B ====
Teams	Pld	W	D	L	PF	PA	+/−	Pts
Scotland	3	3	0	0	51	12	+39	9
Romania	3	2	0	1	33	27	+6	7
Czech Republic	3	0	1	2	22	33	-11	4
Norway	3	0	1	2	14	48	-34	4

Matches

9 July 2016

Scotland	27-0	Norway

9 July 2016

Romania	12-10	Czech Republic

9 July 2016

Scotland	14-5	Czech Republic

9 July 2016

Romania	14-7	Norway

9 July 2016

Scotland	10-7	Romania

9 July 2016

Czech Republic	7-7	Norway

==== Pool C ====
Teams	Pld	W	D	L	PF	PA	+/−	Pts
Sweden	3	3	0	0	90	5	+85	9
Switzerland	3	2	0	1	60	59	+1	7
Hungary	3	1	0	2	38	47	-9	5
Denmark	3	0	0	3	26	103	-77	3

Matches

9 July 2016

Sweden	43-0	Denmark

9 July 2016

Switzerland	21-12	Hungary

9 July 2016

Sweden	19-0	Hungary

9 July 2016

Switzerland	34-19	Denmark

9 July 2016

Sweden	28-5	Switzerland

9 July 2016

Hungary	26-7	Denmark

=== Knockout stage ===
==== Bowl ====
Semi-finals
10 July 2016
Czech Republic	29
Denmark	0
10 July 2016
Norway	10
Moldova	12

Final
10 July 2016
Czech Republic	7
Moldova	5
Third place
10 July 2016
Denmark	0
Norway	17

==== Plate ====
Quarter-finals
10 July 2016
Sweden	24
Israel	0
10 July 2016
Romania	0
Germany	22
10 July 2016
Scotland	12
Hungary	5
10 July 2016
Poland	26
Switzerland	10

Semi-finals
10 July 2016
Israel	5
Romania	12
10 July 2016
Hungary	27
Switzerland	12

Final
10 July 2016
Romania	0
Hungary	17
Third place
10 July 2016
Israel	12
Switzerland	38

==== Cup ====
Quarter-finals
10 July 2016
Sweden	24
Israel	0
10 July 2016
Romania	0
Germany	22
10 July 2016
Scotland	12
Hungary	5
10 July 2016
Poland	26
Switzerland	10

Semi-finals
10 July 2016
Sweden	14
Germany	5
10 July 2016
Scotland	0
Poland	31

Final
10 July 2016
Sweden	25
Poland	5
Third place
10 July 2016
Germany	20
Scotland	12

Date	Venue	Winner	Runner-up	Third
18–19 June	(Czech Republic) Prague	Sweden	Scotland	Poland
9–10 July	(Hungary) Esztergom	Sweden	Poland	Germany

== Final standings ==
Legend
Promoted to 2017 Grand Prix series
Relegated to 2017 Conferences

Rank	Team	Prague	Esztergom	Points
1st place, gold medalist(s)	Sweden	20	20	40
2nd place, silver medalist(s)	Poland	16	18	34
3rd place, bronze medalist(s)	Scotland	18	14	32
4	Germany	14	16	30
5	Romania	12	10	22
6	Hungary	8	12	20
7	Switzerland	10	8	18
8	Czech Republic	6	4	10
9	Israel	3	6	9
10	Moldova	4	3	7
11	Norway	2	2	4
12	Denmark	1	1	2
