= 2017 Rugby Europe Women's Sevens Trophy =

- Hosts: Czech Republic; Hungary
- Nations: 12

Final positions
- Champions: Scotland
- Runners-up: Germany

The 2017 Rugby Europe Women's Sevens Trophy was the second level of international women's rugby sevens competitions organised by Rugby Europe during 2017. The competition featured two tournaments, one hosted in Ostrava and one hosted in Esztergom. Scotland won both tournaments, defeating Germany in both cup finals. Scotland and Germany were promoted to the 2018 Grand Prix series while Malta and Moldova were relegated to the 2018 Conference.

== Tournament 1 (Ostrava) ==
Ostrava Tournament
- Host nation: Czech Republic
- Date: 10–11 June 2017

Cup
- Champion: Scotland
- Runner-up: Germany
- Third: Ukraine

5th Place
- Winner: Hungary
- Runner-up: Czech Republic

Challenge Trophy
- Winner: Moldova
- Runner-up: Latvia

=== Pool stage ===
==== Pool A ====
Teams	Pld	W	D	L	PF	PA	+/−	Pts
Finland	3	3	0	0	52	12	+40	9
Hungary	3	2	0	1	61	22	+39	7
Switzerland	3	1	0	2	41	41	0	5
Malta	3	0	0	3	12	91	-79	3

Matches

10 June 2017
10:00

Finland	22–0	Malta

10 June 2017
10:22

Hungary	21–0	Switzerland

10 June 2017
12:45

Finland	15–0	Switzerland

10 June 2017
13:07

Hungary	28–7	Malta

10 June 2017
15:30

Finland	15–12	Hungary

10 June 2017
15:52

Switzerland	41–5	Malta

==== Pool B ====
Teams	Pld	W	D	L	PF	PA	+/−	Pts
Ukraine	3	3	0	0	51	15	+36	9
Czech Republic	3	2	0	1	48	34	+14	7
Romania	3	1	0	2	36	44	-8	5
Latvia	3	0	0	3	24	66	-42	3

Matches

10 June 2017
11:28

Ukraine	19–0	Latvia

10 June 2017
11:50

Romania	5–17	Czech Republic

10 June 2017
14:13

Romania	21–12	Latvia

10 June 2017
14:35

Ukraine	17–5	Czech Republic

10 June 2017
16:58

Ukraine	15–10	Romania

10 June 2017
17:20

Czech Republic	26–12	Latvia

==== Pool C ====
Teams	Pld	W	D	L	PF	PA	+/−	Pts
Scotland	3	3	0	0	128	0	+128	9
Germany	3	2	0	1	77	36	+41	7
Moldova	3	1	0	2	19	99	-80	5
Israel	3	0	0	3	12	101	-89	3

Matches

10 June 2017
10:44

Scotland	46–0	Moldova

10 June 2017
11:06

Germany	36–0	Israel

10 June 2017
13:29

Scotland	46–0	Israel

10 June 2017
13:51

Germany	41–0	Moldova

10 June 2017
16:14

Scotland	36–0	Germany

10 June 2017
16:36

Israel	12–19	Moldova

=== Knockout stage ===
==== Challenge Trophy ====
Semi-finals
11 June 2017 – 11:28
Moldova	14
Israel	10
11 June 2017 – 11:50
Latvia	20
Malta	15

Final
11 June 2017
Moldova	10
Latvia	5
Third place
11 June 2017
Israel	39
Malta	0

==== 5th place ====
Quarter-finals
4 June 2017 – 10:00
Finland	0
Romania	20
4 June 2017 – 11:06
Czech Republic	10
Germany	32
4 June 2017 – 10:22
Ukraine	40
Switzerland	0
4 June 2017 – 10:44
Scotland	46
Hungary	0

Semi-finals
4 June 2017 – 13:15
Finland	10
Czech Republic	19
4 June 2017 – 13:37
Switzerland	5
Hungary	24

Final
4 June 2017
Czech Republic	5
Hungary	19
Third place
4 June 2017
Finland	12
Switzerland	10

==== Cup ====
Quarter-finals
4 June 2017 – 10:00
Finland	0
Romania	20
4 June 2017 – 11:06
Czech Republic	10
Germany	32
4 June 2017 – 10:22
Ukraine	40
Switzerland	0
4 June 2017 – 10:44
Scotland	46
Hungary	0

Semi-finals
4 June 2017 – 13:59
Romania	12
Germany	22
4 June 2017 – 14:21
Ukraine	7
Scotland	26

Final
4 June 2017 – 17:14
Germany	0
Scotland	46
Third place
4 June 2017 – 16:52
Romania	5
Ukraine	20

== Tournament 2 (Esztergom) ==
Esztergom Tournament
- Host nation: Hungary
- Date: 22–23 July 2017

Cup
- Champion: Scotland
- Runner-up: Germany
- Third: Ukraine

5th place
- Winner: Czech Republic
- Runner-up: Switzerland

Challenge Trophy
- Winner: Hungary
- Runner-up: Israel

=== Pool stage ===
==== Pool A ====
Teams	Pld	W	D	L	PF	PA	+/−	Pts
Scotland	3	3	0	0	124	0	+124	9
Czech Republic	3	2	0	1	69	55	+14	7
Finland	3	1	0	2	43	64	−21	5
Malta	3	0	0	3	0	117	−117	3

Matches

22 July 2017
10:00

Scotland	41−0	Malta

22 July 2017
10:22

Czech Republic	26−10	Finland

22 July 2017
12:45

Scotland	38−0	Finland

22 July 2017
13:07

Czech Republic	43−0	Malta

22 July 2017
15:30

Scotland	45−0	Czech Republic

22 July 2017
15:52

Finland	33−0	Malta

==== Pool B ====
Teams	Pld	W	D	L	PF	PA	+/−	Pts
Germany	3	3	0	0	108	17	+91	9
Switzerland	3	1	1	1	72	68	+4	6
Israel	3	1	0	2	42	78	−36	5
Hungary	3	0	1	2	41	100	−59	4

Matches

22 July 2017
11:28

Germany	26−0	Israel

22 July 2017
11:50

Hungary	22−22	Switzerland

22 July 2017
14:13

Germany	29−12	Switzerland

22 July 2017
14:35

Hungary	14−25	Israel

22 July 2017
16:58

Switzerland	38−17	Israel

22 July 2017
17:20

Germany	53−5	Hungary

==== Pool C ====
Teams	Pld	W	D	L	PF	PA	+/−	Pts
Ukraine	3	3	0	0	85	7	+78	9
Romania	3	2	0	1	58	34	+24	7
Latvia	3	1	0	2	30	57	−27	5
Moldova ^{[Note 1]}	3	0	0	3	0	75	−75	3

Matches

22 July 2017
10:44

Ukraine	31−0	Latvia

22 July 2017
11:06

Romania	25−0	Moldova

22 July 2017
13:29

Ukraine	25−0	Moldova

22 July 2017
13:51

Romania	26−5	Latvia

22 July 2017
16:14

Ukraine	29−7	Romania

22 July 2017
16:36

Moldova	0−25	Latvia

Notes

* ^1 Moldova did not show up for the Esztergom Tournament. Their three pool opponents were awarded 25−0 wins.

=== Knockout round ===
==== Challenge Trophy ====
Semi-finals
23 July 2017– 11:28
Hungary	43
Malta	5
23 July 2017 – 11:50
Israel	W.O.
Moldova

Final
23 July 2017 – 15:05
Hungary	14
Israel	5
Third place
23 July 2017 – 14:43
Malta	W.O.
Moldova

==== 5th place ====
Quarter-finals
23 July 2017 – 10:00
Scotland	50
Latvia	0
23 July 2017 – 11:06
Switzerland	10
Romania	21
23 July 2017 – 10:22
Germany	15
Finland	14
23 July 2017 – 10:44
Ukraine	24
Czech Republic	7

Semi-finals
23 July 2017 – 13:15
Latvia	0
Switzerland	31
23 July 2017 – 13:37
Finland	5
Czech Republic	22

Final
23 July 2017 – 16:24
Switzerland	17
Czech Republic	21
Third place
23 July 2017 – 16:02
Latvia	12
Finland	24

==== Cup ====
Quarter-finals
23 July 2017 – 10:00
Scotland	50
Latvia	0
23 July 2017 – 11:06
Switzerland	10
Romania	21
23 July 2017 – 10:22
Germany	15
Finland	14
23 July 2017 – 10:44
Ukraine	24
Czech Republic	7

Semi-finals
23 July 2017 – 13:59
Scotland	32
Romania	0
23 July 2017 – 14:21
Germany	17
Ukraine	7

Final
23 July 2017 – 17:14
Scotland	33
Germany	5
Third place
23 July 2017 – 16:52
Romania	5
Ukraine	17

== Final standings ==
Date	Venue	Winner	Runner-up	Third
17–18 June	(Czech Republic) Ostrava	Scotland	Germany	Ukraine
22–23 July	(Hungary) Esztergom	Scotland	Germany	Ukraine

Legend
Promoted to 2018 Grand Prix
Relegated to 2018 Conference

Rank	Team	Ostrava	Esztergom	Points
1st place, gold medalist(s)	Scotland	20	20	40
2nd place, silver medalist(s)	Germany	18	18	36
3rd place, bronze medalist(s)	Ukraine	16	16	32
4	Romania	14	14	28
5	Czech Republic	10	12	22
6	Hungary	12	4	16
7	Finland	8	8	16
8	Switzerland	6	10	16
9	Latvia	3	6	9
10	Israel	2	3	5
11	Malta	1	2	3
12	Moldova ^{[Note 1]}	4	0	0

Notes

- ^1 Moldova were disqualified and relegated after failing to show up at the Esztergom Tournament.
