= 2012 FIRA-AER Women's Sevens – Division A =

International women's rugby sevens tournament

- Host nation: Bulgaria; Belgium

(Bulgaria) Sofia (Group A)
- Date: 9–10 June 2012
- Champion: Wales
- Runner-up: Croatia
- Third: Romania

Tournament details
- Matches played: 42

(Belgium) Ghent (Group B)
- Date: 9–10 June 2012
- Champion: Ireland
- Runner-up: Scotland
- Third: Belgium

Tournament details
- Matches played: 29

The 2012 FIRA-AER Women's Sevens – Division A was a European pre-qualifying tournament for the 2013 Rugby World Cup Sevens. In similar fashion to the 2008 competition, Division B was cancelled and all the teams were promoted to Division A for 2012. Teams were divided into two groups with both tournaments played on the same dates in Bulgaria and Belgium. Unlike 2008, only the top two teams in both Groups were promoted to the Grand Prix Series for the final qualification phase.

Wales, Croatia, Ireland and Scotland were the four teams to advance to the Grand Prix Series for the final qualifying tournament.

== Teams ==
Group A teams

- Andorra
- Austria
- Bosnia and Herzegovina
- Bulgaria
- Croatia
- Denmark
- Hungary
- Latvia
- Lithuania
- Romania
- Slovakia
- Wales

Group B teams

- Belgium
- Czech Republic
- Finland
- Georgia
- Ireland
- Israel
- Malta
- Norway
- Poland
- Scotland

== Group A ==
The Group A tournament was held on 9 and 10 June 2012 at Sofia, Bulgaria.

=== Pool Stages ===
==== Pool A ====
Nation	Won	Drawn	Lost	For	Against
Hungary	5	0	0	158	19
Romania	4	0	1	201	21
Latvia	3	0	2	78	45
Bulgaria	2	0	3	43	114
Slovakia	1	0	4	41	151
Lithuania	0	0	5	10	181

9 June 2012

Latvia	26–0	Slovakia

9 June 2012

Bulgaria	7–40	Hungary

9 June 2012

Romania	55–0	Lithuania

9 June 2012

Hungary	36–5	Slovakia

9 June 2012

Latvia	38–0	Lithuania

9 June 2012

Romania	48–0	Bulgaria

9 June 2012

Lithuania	5–29	Slovakia

9 June 2012

Romania	7–21	Hungary

9 June 2012

Bulgaria	0–14	Latvia

9 June 2012

Hungary	44–0	Lithuania

9 June 2012

Bulgaria	21–7	Slovakia

9 June 2012

Romania	28–0	Latvia

10 June 2012

Bulgaria	15–5	Lithuania

10 June 2012

Latvia	0–17	Hungary

10 June 2012

Romania	63–0	Slovakia

==== Pool B ====
Nation	Won	Drawn	Lost	For	Against
Wales	5	0	0	238	0
Croatia	4	0	1	161	36
Denmark	3	0	2	103	97
Austria	2	0	3	85	81
Andorra	1	0	4	45	172
Bosnia and Herzegovina	0	0	5	0	246

9 June 2012

Denmark	0–35	Wales

9 June 2012

Austria	34–0	Andorra

9 June 2012

Croatia	38–0	Bosnia and Herzegovina

9 June 2012

Andorra	0–55	Wales

9 June 2012

Denmark	56–0	Bosnia and Herzegovina

9 June 2012

Croatia	29–0	Austria

9 June 2012

Bosnia and Herzegovina	0–75	Wales

9 June 2012

Croatia	51–0	Andorra

9 June 2012

Austria	7–10	Denmark

9 June 2012

Andorra	33–0	Bosnia and Herzegovina

9 June 2012

Austria	0–42	Wales

9 June 2012

Croatia	43–5	Denmark

10 June 2012

Austria	44–0	Bosnia and Herzegovina

10 June 2012

Denmark	32–12	Andorra

10 June 2012

Croatia	0–31	Wales

=== Classification Stages ===
==== Bowl Semi-finals ====
Semi-finals
10 June 2012
Slovakia	27
Bosnia-Herzegovina	0
10 June 2012
Lithuania	15
Andorra	0

Bowl Final
10 June 2012
Slovakia	10
Lithuania	0
11th Place
10 June 2012
Andorra	17
Bosnia-Herzegovina	0

==== Plate Semi-finals ====
Semi-finals
10 June 2012
Latvia	0
Austria	10
10 June 2012
Bulgaria	0
Denmark	31

Plate Final
10 June 2012
Austria	17
Denmark	12
7th Place
10 June 2012
Latvia	24
Bulgaria	7

==== Cup Semi-finals ====
Semi-finals
10 June 2012
Hungary	7
Croatia	14
10 June 2012
Wales	46
Romania	0

Cup Final
10 June 2012
Wales	49
Croatia	0
3rd Place
10 June 2012
Romania	33
Hungary	5

== Group B ==
The Group B tournament was held on 9 and 10 June at Ghent, Belgium.

=== Pool Stages ===
==== Pool A ====
Nation	Won	Drawn	Lost	For	Against
Scotland	4	0	0	155	12
Georgia	3	0	1	115	26
Finland	2	0	2	24	104
Norway	1	0	3	20	90
Malta	0	0	4	5	87

9 June 2012

Scotland	59–0	Finland

9 June 2012

Norway	15–0	Malta

9 June 2012

Finland	0–45	Georgia

9 June 2012

Norway	0–46	Scotland

9 June 2012

Malta	0–26	Georgia

9 June 2012

Finland	7–0	Norway

9 June 2012

Malta	5–27	Scotland

9 June 2012

Norway	5–37	Georgia

10 June 2012

Finland	17–0	Malta

10 June 2012

Georgia	7–21	Scotland

==== Pool B ====
Nation	Won	Drawn	Lost	For	Against
Ireland	4	0	0	169	0
Belgium	3	0	1	69	50
Czech Republic	1	1	2	48	83
Poland	1	1	2	29	65
Israel	0	0	4	5	122

9 June 2012

Ireland	40–0	Czech Republic

9 June 2012

Belgium	17–12	Poland

9 June 2012

Czech Republic	36–5	Israel

9 June 2012

Belgium	0–31	Ireland

9 June 2012

Poland	12–0	Israel

9 June 2012

Czech Republic	7–33	Belgium

9 June 2012

Poland	0–43	Ireland

9 June 2012

Belgium	19–0	Israel

10 June 2012

Czech Republic	5–5	Poland

10 June 2012

Israel	0–55	Ireland

=== Classification Stages ===
==== Cup Semi-finals ====
Semi-finals
10 June 2012
Scotland	26
Belgium	7
10 June 2012
Ireland	46
Georgia	0

Cup Final
10 June 2012
Ireland	29
Scotland	0
3rd Place
10 June 2012
Belgium	14
Georgia	7

==== Plate Semi-finals ====
Semi-finals
10 June 2012
Finland	0
Poland	31
10 June 2012
Norway	7
Czech Republic	12

Plate Final
10 June 2012 (AET)
Czech Republic	17
Poland	12
7th Place
10 June 2012
Norway	10
Finland	5

==== Bowl Final ====
Bowl Final
10 June 2012
Malta	7
Israel	0
