= 2015 Rugby Europe Women's Sevens – Division A =

Rugby union tournament

- Host nation: Lithuania
- Date: 13–14 June 2015

Cup
- Champion: Belgium
- Runner-up: Finland
- Third: Sweden

Plate
- Winner: Poland
- Runner-up: Switzerland

Bowl
- Winner: Hungary
- Runner-up: Moldova

The 2015 Rugby Europe Women's Sevens – Division A was the second level of international women's rugby sevens competitions organised by Rugby Europe for 2015. The competition featured just one tournament, played at the Darius and Girėnas Stadium. Belgium won the tournament, and along with runner-up Finland, were promoted to the 2016 Grand Prix series. Georgia and Lithuania were relegated to the 2016 Conferences.

== Tournament ==
Key to colours in group tables
Teams that advance to Quarterfinals

=== Pool stage ===
==== Pool A ====
Teams	Pld	W	D	L	PF	PA	+/−	Pts
Belgium	3	3	0	0	96	7	+89	9
Czech Republic	3	2	0	1	29	31	−2	7
Finland	3	1	0	2	34	27	+7	5
Lithuania	3	0	0	3	0	94	−94	3

13 June 2015
10:00

Belgium	50–0	Lithuania
	Report

Kaunas

13 June 2015
11:06

Finland	5–7	Czech Republic
	Report

Kaunas

13 June 2015
13:00

Belgium	26–7	Czech Republic
	Report

Kaunas

13 June 2015
14:06

Finland	29–0	Lithuania
	Report

Kaunas

13 June 2015
16:00

Czech Republic	15–0	Lithuania
	Report

Kaunas

13 June 2015
17:06

Belgium	20–0	Finland
	Report

Kaunas

==== Pool B ====
Teams	Pld	W	D	L	PF	PA	+/−	Pts
Sweden	3	2	1	0	61	29	+32	8
Poland	3	2	0	1	69	10	+59	7
Moldova	3	1	0	2	29	81	−52	5
Hungary	3	0	1	2	31	70	−39	0

13 June 2015
10:22

Sweden	17–17	Hungary
	Report

Kaunas

13 June 2015
11:28

Moldova	0–33	Poland
	Report

Kaunas

13 June 2015
13:22

Sweden	10–7	Poland
	Report

Kaunas

13 June 2015
14:28

Moldova	24–14	Hungary
	Report

Kaunas

13 June 2015
16:22

Poland	29–0	Hungary
	Report

Kaunas

13 June 2015
17:28

Sweden	34–5	Moldova
	Report

Kaunas

==== Pool C ====
Teams	Pld	W	D	L	PF	PA	+/−	Pts
Switzerland	3	3	0	0	49	22	+27	9
Romania	3	2	0	1	57	17	+40	7
Norway	3	1	0	2	31	55	−24	5
Georgia	3	0	0	3	12	55	−43	3

13 June 2015
10:44

Romania	26–5	Norway
	Report

Kaunas

13 June 2015
11:50

Georgia	0–20	Switzerland
	Report

Kaunas

13 June 2015
13:44

Romania	10–12	Switzerland
	Report

Kaunas

13 June 2015
14:50

Georgia	12–14	Norway
	Report

Kaunas

13 June 2015
16:44

Switzerland	17–12	Norway
	Report

Kaunas

13 June 2015
17:50

Romania	21–0	Georgia
	Report

Kaunas

=== Knockout stage ===
==== Bowl ====
Semi-finals
14 June 2015 – 11:28 – Kazan
Moldova	15
Lithuania	0
14 June 2015 – 11:50 – Kazan
Hungary	10
Georgia	0

Final
14 June 2015 – 15:02 – Kazan
Moldova	12
Hungary	17
Third place
14 June 2015 – 14:40 – Kazan
Lithuania	5
Georgia	24

==== Plate ====
Quarter-finals
14 June 2015 – 10:00 – Kaunas
Belgium	25
Norway	5
14 June 2015 – 11:06 – Kaunas
Poland	12
Romania	21
14 June 2015 – 10:22 – Kaunas
Switzerland	7
Finland	12
14 June 2015 – 10:44 – Kaunas
Sweden	20
Czech Republic	12

Semi-finals
14 June 2015 – 13:12 – Kaunas
Norway	5
Poland	12
14 June 2015 – 13:34 – Kaunas
Switzerland	12
Czech Republic	10

Final
14 June 2015 – 16:16 – Kaunas
Switzerland	0
Poland	34
Third place
14 June 2015 – 15:54 – Kaunas
Norway	5
Czech Republic	15

==== Cup ====
Quarter-finals
14 June 2015 – 10:00 – Kaunas
Belgium	25
Norway	5
14 June 2015 – 11:06 – Kaunas
Poland	12
Romania	21
14 June 2015 – 10:22 – Kaunas
Switzerland	7
Finland	12
14 June 2015 – 10:44 – Kaunas
Sweden	20
Czech Republic	12

Semi-finals
14 June 2015 – 13:56 – Kaunas
Belgium	17
Romania	0
14 June 2015 – 14:18 – Kaunas
Finland	17
Sweden	12

Final
14 June 2015 – 17:05 – Kaunas
Belgium	29
Finland	7
Third place
14 June 2015 – 16:43 – Kaunas
Romania	7
Sweden	12

=== Division A standings ===
Legend
Qualified for the Rugby Europe repechage tournament and promoted to the 2016 Grand Prix series.
Qualified for the Rugby Europe repechage tournament.
Relegated to 2016 Conferences.

Rank	Team
1st place, gold medalist(s)	Belgium
2nd place, silver medalist(s)	Finland
3rd place, bronze medalist(s)	Sweden
4	Romania
5	Poland
6	Switzerland
7	Czech Republic
8	Norway
9	Hungary
10	Moldova
11	Georgia
12	Lithuania
