= 2018 Rugby Europe Women's Sevens Trophy =

- Hosts: Ukraine; Hungary
- Date: 23 June - 8 July

Final positions
- Champions: Netherlands
- Runners-up: Ukraine
- Third: Sweden

The 2018 Rugby Europe Women's Sevens Trophy is the second division of the 2018 Rugby Europe Women's Sevens. This edition was hosted by the cities of Dnipro and Szeged from 23 June to 1 July, with the two highest-placed teams promoted to the 2019 Grand Prix and the two teams with the fewest points relegated to the 2019 Conference.

== Schedule ==
Date	Venue	Winner	Runner-up	Third
23–24 June	(Ukraine) Dnipro	Netherlands	Ukraine	Sweden
7–8 July	(Hungary) Szeged	Netherlands	Ukraine	Sweden

== Standings ==
Legend
Promoted to 2019 Grand Prix
Relegated to 2019 Conference 1

Rank	Team	Dnipro	Szeged	Points
1st place, gold medalist(s)	Netherlands	20	20	40
2nd place, silver medalist(s)	Ukraine	18	18	36
3rd place, bronze medalist(s)	Sweden	16	16	32
4	Romania	14	14	28
5	Hungary	12	10	22
6	Czech Republic	4	12	16
7	Finland	6	8	14
8	Norway	8	6	14
9	Switzerland	10	4	14
10	Israel	2	3	5
11	Austria	3	2	5
12	Latvia	1	1	2

== Dnipro ==
The event was held between 23 and 24 June 2018.

Event	Winners	Score	Finalists	Semifinalists
Cup	Netherlands	33–0	Ukraine	Sweden (Third); Romania
5th Place	Hungary	27–7	Switzerland	Norway (Seventh); Finland
Challenge Trophy	Czech Republic	36–5	Austria	Israel (Eleventh); Latvia

Key to colours in group tables
Teams that advance to Cup Quarterfinal
Teams that advance to Challenge Trophy Semifinals

=== Pool stage ===
==== Pool A ====
Team	Pld	W	D	L	PF	PA	PD	Pts
Sweden	3	3	0	0	82	10	+72	9
Hungary	3	2	0	1	48	46	+2	7
Finland	3	1	0	2	40	34	+6	5
Austria	3	0	0	3	5	85	–80	3

23 June 2018	Sweden	34–0	Austria
9:00

23 June 2018	Hungary	17–10	Finland
9:22

23 June 2018	Sweden	17–0	Finland
11:45

23 June 2018	Hungary	31–5	Austria
12:07

23 June 2018	Sweden	31–0	Hungary
14:30

23 June 2018	Finland	20–0	Austria
14:52

==== Pool B ====
Team	Pld	W	D	L	PF	PA	PD	Pts
Netherlands	3	3	0	0	126	15	+111	9
Switzerland	3	2	0	1	43	82	–39	7
Norway	3	1	0	2	45	82	–37	5
Czech Republic	3	0	0	3	46	81	–35	3

23 June 2018	Netherlands	38–5	Norway
9:44

23 June 2018	Czech Republic	14–21	Switzerland
10:06

23 June 2018	Netherlands	54–0	Switzerland
12:29

23 June 2018	Czech Republic	22–26	Norway
12:51

23 June 2018	Netherlands	34–10	Czech Republic
15:14

23 June 2018	Switzerland	22–14	Netherlands
15:36

==== Pool C ====
Team	Pld	W	D	L	PF	PA	PD	Pts
Romania	3	3	0	0	82	17	+65	9
Ukraine	3	2	0	1	89	29	+60	7
Latvia	3	0	1	2	31	81	–50	4
Israel	3	0	1	2	19	94	–75	4

23 June 2018	Romania	17–7	Latvia
10:28

23 June 2018	Ukraine	34–0	Latvia
10:50

23 June 2018	Romania	41–0	Israel
13:13

23 June 2018	Ukraine	45–5	Latvia
13:35

23 June 2018	Latvia	19–19	Israel
15:58

23 June 2018	Ukraine	10–24	Romania
16:20

=== Knockout stage ===
==== Challenge Trophy ====
Semi-finals
24 June 2018 – 10:28
Latvia	5
Austria	36
24 June 2018 – 10:50
Israel	0
Czech Republic	24

Final
24 June 2018 – 14:05
Austria	5
Czech Republic	36
Eleventh Place
24 June 2018 – 13:43
Latvia	0
Israel	31

==== 5th place ====
Semi-finals
24 June 2018 – 12:15
Norway	5
Switzerland	27
24 June 2018 – 12:37
Finland	7
Hungary	12

Final
24 June 2018 – 15:24
Switzerland	7
Hungary	27
Seventh Place
24 June 2018 – 15:02
Norway	22
Finland	12

==== Cup ====
Quarter-finals
24 June 2018 – 9:00
Sweden	39
Norway	0
24 June 2018 – 10:06
Switzerland	0
Ukraine	39
24 June 2018 – 9:22
Netherlands	57
Finland	0
24 June 2018 – 9:44
Romania	31
Hungary	15

Semi-finals
24 June 2018 – 12:59
Sweden	12
Ukraine	17
24 June 2018 – 13:21
Netherlands	33
Romania	0

Final
24 June 2018 – 16:11
Ukraine	0
Netherlands	33
Third place
24 June 2018 – 15:46
Sweden	19
Romania	12

== Szeged ==
The event was held between 7–8 July 2018.

Event	Winners	Score	Finalists	Semifinalists
Cup	Netherlands	19–12	Ukraine	Sweden (Third); Romania
5th Place	Czech Republic	24–0	Hungary	Finland (Seventh); Norway
Challenge Trophy	Switzerland	24–5	Israel	Austria (Eleventh); Latvia

=== Pool stage ===
Key to colours in group tables
Teams that advance to Cup Quarterfinal
Teams that advance to Challenge Trophy Semifinals

==== Pool A ====
Team	Pld	W	D	L	PF	PA	PD	Pts
Netherlands	3	3	0	0	156	0	+156	9
Norway	3	2	0	1	45	77	–32	7
Switzerland	3	1	0	2	45	75	–30	5
Latvia	3	0	0	3	31	125	–94	3

7 July 2018	Netherlands	64–0	Latvia
10:40

7 July 2018	Switzerland	12–17	Norway
11:02

7 July 2018	Netherlands	46–0	Norway
13:20

7 July 2018	Switzerland	33–12	Latvia
13:42

7 July 2018	Netherlands	46–0	Switzerland
16:05

7 July 2018	Norway	28–19	Latvia
16:27

==== Pool B ====
Team	Pld	W	D	L	PF	PA	PD	Pts
Ukraine	3	3	0	0	110	17	+93	9
Hungary	3	1	0	2	53	51	+2	5
Finland	3	1	0	2	27	39	–12	5
Israel	3	1	0	2	12	95	–83	5

7 July 2018	Ukraine	52–0	Israel
12:08

7 July 2018	Hungary	5–15	Finland
12:30

7 July 2018	Ukraine	29–12	Finland
14:48

7 July 2018	Hungary	17–7	Israel
15:10

7 July 2018	Finland	0–5	Israel
17:33

7 July 2018	Ukraine	29–5	Hungary
17:55

==== Pool C ====
Team	Pld	W	D	L	PF	PA	PD	Pts
Romania	3	3	0	0	48	20	+28	9
Sweden	3	2	0	1	77	12	+65	7
Czech Republic	3	1	0	2	41	62	–21	5
Austria	3	0	0	3	10	82	–72	3

7 July 2018	Sweden	27–0	Austria
11:24

7 July 2018	Romania	17–5	Czech Republic
11:46

7 July 2018	Sweden	40–0	Czech Republic
14:04

7 July 2018	Romania	19–5	Austria
14:26

7 July 2018	Sweden	10–12	Romania
16:49

7 July 2018	Czech Republic	36–5	Austria
17:11

=== Knockout stage ===
==== Challenge Trophy ====
Semi-finals
8 July 2018 – 11:28
Switzerland	31
Latvia	5
8 July 2018 – 11:50
Israel	24
Austria	5

Final
8 July 2018 – 15:05
Switzerland	24
Israel	5
Eleventh Place
8 July 2018 – 14:43
Latvia	17
Austria	19

==== 5th place ====
Semi-finals
8 July 2018 – 13:15
Hungary	19
Finland	17
8 July 2018 – 13:37
Czech Republic	27
Norway	5

Final
8 July 2018 – 16:24
Hungary	0
Czech Republic	24
Seventh Place
8 July 2018 – 16:02
Finland	5
Norway	0

==== Cup ====
Quarter-finals
8 July 2018 – 10:00
Netherlands	57
Hungary	5
8 July 2018 – 11:06
Finland	5
Sweden	20
8 July 2018 – 10:22
Ukraine	31
Czech Republic	5
8 July 2018 – 10:44
Romania	36
Norway	0

Semi-finals
8 July 2018 – 13:59
Netherlands	24
Sweden	7
8 July 2018 – 14:21
Ukraine	50
Romania	5

Final
8 July 2018 – 17:11
Netherlands	19
Ukraine	12
Third place
8 July 2018 – 16:49
Sweden	19
Romania	7
