= 2014 Rugby Europe Women's Sevens – Division A =

- Host nation: Norway
- Date: 7–8 June 2014

Cup
- Champion: Scotland
- Runner-up: Ukraine
- Third: Romania

Plate
- Winner: Finland
- Runner-up: Moldova

Bowl
- Winner: Switzerland
- Runner-up: Norway

The 2014 Rugby Europe Women's Sevens – Division A was the second level of international women's rugby sevens competitions organised by Rugby Europe for 2014. The competition featured just one tournament, played in Bergen. Scotland won the tournament, and along with runner-up Ukraine, were promoted to the 2015 Grand Prix series.

== Pool stages ==
=== Group A ===
Nation	Won	Drawn	Lost	For	Against
Ukraine	2	0	0	79	5
Romania	2	0	1	55	29
Switzerland	1	0	1	37	89
Norway	0	0	3	7	75

- Ukraine 22-0 Norway
- Switzerland 10-24 Romania
- Ukraine 19-5 Romania
- Switzerland 27-7 Norway
- Romania 26-0 Norway
- Ukraine 38-0 Switzerland

=== Group B ===
Nation	Won	Drawn	Lost	For	Against
Scotland	3	0	0	110	7
Moldova	1	0	1	39	55
Finland	1	0	2	24	53
Croatia	1	0	2	12	70

- Scotland 36-0 Finland
- Moldova 27-0 Croatia
- Scotland 36-0 Croatia
- Moldova 5-17 Finland
- Croatia 12-7 Finland
- Scotland 38-7 Moldova

=== Group C ===
Nation	Won	Drawn	Lost	For	Against
Georgia	2	0	1	58	17
Czech Republic	2	0	0	58	24
Poland	2	0	1	46	32
Denmark	0	0	3	5	94

- Czech Republic 36-0 Denmark
- Poland 5-17 Georgia
- Czech Republic 12-7 Georgia
- Poland 24-5 Denmark
- Georgia 34-0 Denmark
- Czech Republic 10-17 Poland

== Knockout stage ==
=== Bowl ===
Semi-finals

- Switzerland 36-0 Denmark
- Croatia 0-17 Norway

11th/12th Match

- Denmark 32-19 Croatia

Bowl final:9th/10th Match

- Switzerland 25-0 Norway

=== Plate ===
Semi-finals

- Finland 17-0 Czech Republic
- Poland 14-17 Moldova

7th/8th Match

- Czech Republic 22-0 Poland

Plate final: 5th/6th Match

- Finland 5-10 Moldova

=== Cup ===
Quarter-finals

- Scotland 20-10 Finland
- Ukraine 22-0 Poland
- Georgia 14-10 Moldova
- Czech Republic 10-12 Romania

Semi-finals

- Scotland 14-7 Romania
- Ukraine 34-5 Georgia

3rd/4th place

- Romania 12-5 Georgia

Cup Final: 1st/2nd place

- Scotland 5-17 Ukraine
