= Turkey women's national rugby sevens team =

Women's team representing Turkey in international rugby union

Turkey
- Union: Turkish Rugby Federation
- Nickname: Ay Yıldızlar (The Crescent Stars)

First international
- Turkey 0–38 Finland (25 May 2013)

Largest win
- Turkey 55–0 Bosnia and Herzegovina (23 July 2016)

Largest defeat
- Czech Republic 55–0 Turkey (19 June 2021)

The Turkey women's national rugby sevens team represents Turkey at rugby sevens – however it has yet to play any recognised international matches. Rugby union in Turkey is administered by the Turkish Rugby Federation. At present, the Federation is not a member of World Rugby and so, currently, any internationals it may play are unlikely to be widely recognised. Şahin Kömürcü is the president of the Turkish Rugby Federation.

== Events ==
- Rugby Europe Women's Sevens
- Rugby World Cup Sevens

== Competitive record ==
1. 2013 FIRA-AER Women's Sevens – Division B
2. 2014 Rugby Europe Women's Sevens – Division B
3. 2015 Rugby Europe Women's Sevens – Division B
4. 2016 Rugby Europe Women's Sevens Conference
5. 2018 Rugby Europe Women's Sevens Conference
6. 2019 Rugby Europe Women's Sevens Trophy
7. 2021 Rugby Europe Women's Sevens Trophy
8. 2022 Rugby Europe Women's Sevens Trophy
9. 2023 Rugby Europe Women's Sevens Trophy
10. Rugby sevens at the 2023 European Games
11. 2024 Rugby Europe Women's Sevens Championship Series

== Record ==
As of 15 July 2021

=== Overall record ===
Opponent	First game	Played	Won	Drawn	Lost	Percentage
Andorra	2013	2	2	0	0	100%
Bosnia and Herzegovina	2013	2	2	0	0	100%
Bulgaria	2015	2	1	0	1	50%
Croatia	2015	2	1	0	1	50%
Czech Republic	2021	2	0	0	2	0%
Denmark	2015	3	1	0	2	33.33%
Finland	2013	2	0	0	2	0%
Georgia	2016	4	3	0	1	75%
Germany	2019	2	0	0	2	0%
Hungary	2021	2	0	0	2	0%
Israel	2014	2	0	0	2	0%
Latvia	2013	3	0	0	3	0%
Lithuania	2013	1	1	0	0	100%
Luxembourg	2014	2	1	1	0	50%
Malta	2013	4	2	0	2	50%
Moldova	2021	1	1	0	0	100%
Montenegro	2015	2	2	0	0	100%
Norway	2013	2	0	0	2	0%
Portugal	2019	1	0	0	1	0%
Romania	2019	1	0	0	1	0%
Slovenia	2014	2	2	0	0	100%
Sweden	2019	2	0	0	2	0%
Switzerland	2019	3	3	0	0	100%
Ukraine	2021	2	0	0	2	0%
Summary	2013	51	22	1	28	43.13%

=== Results ===
Number	Opponent	Result
2013
1	Finland	0 – 38 L
2	Bosnia and Herzegovina	43 – 0 W
3	Lithuania	22 – 0 W
4	Malta	5 – 31 L
5	Norway	5 – 45 L
6	Latvia	7 – 36 L
7	Andorra	10 – 5 W
2014
8	Slovenia	29 – 0 W
9	Israel	0 – 10 L
10	Luxembourg	33 – 0 W
11	Malta	12 – 26 L
2015
12	Luxembourg	17 – 17 D
13	Montenegro	22 – 5 W
14	Denmark	0 – 22 L
15	Croatia	7 – 10 L
16	Bulgaria	14 – 7 W
17	Malta	10 – 7 W
2016
18	Bosnia and Herzegovina	55 – 0 W
19	Montenegro	41 – 5 W
20	Latvia	7 – 12 L
21	Georgia	24 – 0 W
22	Latvia	7 – 12 L
23	Slovenia	19 – 5 W
2018
24	Malta	17 – 7 W
25	Bulgaria	12 – 27 L
26	Andorra	22 – 7 W
27	Denmark	19 – 14 W
28	Croatia	12 – 10 W
29	Georgia	12 – 17 L
2019
30	Germany	5 – 17 L
31	Czech Republic	12 – 24 L
32	Switzerland	14 – 10 W
33	Germany	0 – 33 L
34	Norway	0 – 12 L
35	Portugal	7 – 38 L
36	Sweden	0 – 39 L
37	Romania	5 – 29 L
38	Switzerland	15 – 12 W
39	Israel	0 – 5 L
40	Switzerland	15 – 10 W
2021
41	Hungary	21 – 26 L
42	Finland	14 – 22 L
43	Czech Republic	0 – 55 L
44	Ukraine	0 – 37 L
45	Georgia	17 – 0 W
46	Hungary	14 – 17 L
47	Denmark	0 – 29 L
48	Georgia	12 – 5 W
49	Sweden	0 – 24 L
50	Ukraine	0 – 42 L
51	Moldova	41 – 0 W

=== 2022 ===
- 2022 Rugby Europe Women's Sevens Trophy

Zagreb

1. Turkey 12 - 7 Finland
2. Turkey 28 - 7 Norway
3. Turkey 5 - 24 Sweden
4. Turkey 22 - 7 Denmark
5. Turkey 5 - 17 Italy
6. Turkey 12 - 10 Finland

Budapest

1. Turkey 10 - 12 Norway
2. Turkey 22 - 0 Denmark
3. Turkey 5 - 27 Italy
4. Turkey 5 - 12 Italy
5. Turkey 22 - 5 Georgia
6. Turkey 20 - 5 Norway

=== 2023 ===
- 2023 Rugby Europe Women's Sevens Trophy

Zagreb

1. Turkey 12 - 22 Ukraine
2. Turkey 28 - 7 Moldova
3. Turkey 31 - 0 Denmark
4. Turkey 24 - 5 Hungary
5. Turkey 26 - 5 Finland
6. Turkey 5 - 17 Ukraine

Budapest

1. Turkey 29 - 12 Norway
2. Turkey 29 - 0 Israel
3. Turkey 27 - 5 Latvia
4. Turkey 24 - 0 Hungary
5. Turkey 17 - 0 Finland
6. Turkey 7 - 14 Ukraine
- Rugby sevens at the 2023 European Games
1. Turkey 0 - 50 Poland
2. Turkey 5 - 31 Germany
3. Turkey 5 - 36 Portugal
4. Turkey 7 - 10 Sweden
5. Turkey 5 - 10 Norway

=== 2024 ===
2024 Rugby Europe Women's Sevens Championship Series

Croatia

1. Turkey 0 - 50 France
2. Turkey 12 - 31 Ireland
3. Turkey 10 - 19 Czech Republic
4. Turkey 26 - 19 Portugal
5. Turkey 10 - 24 Italy

Germany

1. Turkey 0 - 29 Belgium
2. Turkey 0 - 46 Spain
3. Turkey 12 - 17 Italy
4. Turkey 0 - 27 Portugal
5. Turkey 17 - 12 Ukraine (AET)

== All (2013-2024) ==
All-time records

The following table shows Turkey women's all-time international record As of 30 June 2024:

Period	M	W	D	L	GF	GA	GD
2013–2024	90	40	1	49	1211	1498	-287

== See also ==
- Rugby union in Turkey
- Turkey women's national rugby league team
- Turkey national rugby union team
- Turkey national rugby league team
