= 2024 Rugby Europe Women's Sevens Championship Series =

Rugby tournaments

2024 Rugby Europe Women's Sevens
- Hosts: Croatia; Germany
- Date: 7 – 30 June 2024
- Nations: 12

Final positions
- Champions: France
- Runners-up: Belgium
- Third: Spain

Team changes
- Relegated: Turkey; Ukraine

The 2024 Rugby Europe Women's Sevens Championship Series is the 2024 edition of the continental championship for rugby sevens in Europe. The series takes place over two legs, the first at Makarska in Croatia and the second at Hamburg in Germany.

== Teams ==
The list of teams to be participating in the Sevens Championship Series.

Sweden and Romania, were relegated to the 2024 Trophy tournament after finishing eleventh and twelfth respectively in the previous year's Championship tournament.

Ukraine and Turkey, were promoted after finishing first and second respectively in the previous year's Trophy tournament.

- Belgium
- Czech Republic
- France
- Germany
- Great Britain
- Ireland
- Italy
- Poland
- Portugal
- Spain
- Turkey
- Ukraine

== Schedule ==
The official schedule for the 2024 Rugby Europe Women's Sevens Championship Series is:

2023 Series schedule
Leg	Stadium	City	Dates	Winners	Runners-up	Third place
Croatia	Gradski stadion	Makarska	7–9 June	Poland	France	Belgium
Germany	Sports Park Steinwiesenweg	Hamburg	28–30 June	France	Great Britain	Belgium

== Standings ==
2024 Rugby Europe Sevens Championship
Pos	Event Team	Makarska	Hamburg	Points total
1	France	18	20	38
2	Belgium	16	16	32
3	Spain	14	14	28^{*}
4	Poland	20	8	28^{*}
5	Great Britain	8	18	26
6	Czech Republic	12	10	22
7	Ireland	6	12	18
8	Germany	10	6	16
9	Italy	4	3	7
10	Portugal	2	4	6
11	Turkey	3	2	5
12	Ukraine	1	1	2

Legend
Blue fill	Entry to World Challenger Series
Dark bar	Already a core team for the 2024–25 SVNS
Red fill	Relegated to 2025 European Trophy

Notes:

^^{*} As per Rugby Europe rules, "In case of two teams equal in ranking points at the end of the series, the point difference will apply (difference of points scored ‘for and against’ by each respective team in all tournaments Matches). The Team with the highest point difference shall be ranked higher in the final competition ranking." Therefore Spain (+135) were placed higher than Poland (+68) due to higher points difference.

== Makarska ==
=== Pool A ===
Team	W	D	L	PF	PA	PD	Pts
France	3	0	0	111	17	+94	9
Ireland	2	0	1	60	67	-7	7
Czech Republic	1	0	2	53	60	-7	5
Turkey	0	0	3	22	102	-80	3

7 June
11:58

Ireland	24–22	Czech Republic

Gradski stadion, Makarska

7 June
12:20

France	50–0	Turkey

Gradski stadion, Makarska

7 June
17:08

Ireland	31–12	Turkey

Gradski stadion, Makarska

7 June
17:30

France	26–12	Czech Republic

Gradski stadion, Makarska

8 June
11:58

Czech Republic	19–10	Turkey

Gradski stadion, Makarska

8 June
12:20

France	33–5	Ireland

Gradski stadion, Makarska

=== Pool B ===
Team	W	D	L	PF	PA	PD	Pts
Spain	3	0	0	87	36	+51	9
Belgium	2	0	1	60	31	+29	7
Germany	1	0	2	26	53	-27	5
Ukraine	0	0	3	24	94	-79	3

7 June
11:14

Belgium	19–12	Germany

Gradski stadion, Makarska

7 June
11:36

Spain	39–12	Ukraine

Gradski stadion, Makarska

7 June
16:24

Belgium	31–5	Ukraine

Gradski stadion, Makarska

7 June
16:46

Spain	34–14	Germany

Gradski stadion, Makarska

8 June
11:14

Germany	24–7	Ukraine

Gradski stadion, Makarska

8 June
11:36

Spain	14–10	Belgium

Gradski stadion, Makarska

=== Pool C ===
Team	W	D	L	PF	PA	PD	Pts
Poland	3	0	0	99	32	+67	9
Great Britain	2	0	1	58	50	+8	7
Portugal	1	0	2	37	72	-35	5
Italy	0	0	3	30	70	-40	3

7 June
10:30

Poland	38–10	Italy

Gradski stadion, Makarska

7 June
10:52

Great Britain	31–10	Portugal

Gradski stadion, Makarska

7 June
15:40

Poland	36–17	Portugal

Gradski stadion, Makarska

7 June
16:02

Great Britain	22–15	Italy

Gradski stadion, Makarska

8 June
10:30

Italy	5–10	Portugal

Gradski stadion, Makarska

8 June
10:52

Great Britain	5–25	Poland

Gradski stadion, Makarska

=== 9th to 12th playoffs ===
9th place semifinals
8 June 2024– 15:40 – Gradski stadion
Portugal	19
Turkey	26
8 June 2024– 16:02 – Gradski stadion
Italy	36
Ukraine	5

9th place final
9 June 2024– 14:44 – Gradski stadion
Turkey	10
Italy	24
11th place final
9 June 2024– 14:00 – Gradski stadion
Portugal	38
Ukraine	0

=== 5th to 8th playoffs ===
5th place semifinals
9 June 2024– 10:30 – Gradski stadion
Germany	22
Great Britain	19
9 June 2024– 10:52 – Gradski stadion
Czech Republic	10
Ireland	5

5th place final
9 June 2024– 16:12 – Gradski stadion
Germany	0
Czech Republic	36
7th place final
9 June 2024– 15:28 – Gradski stadion
Great Britain	19
Ireland	0

=== Cup ===
Quarterfinals
8 June 2024– 16:24 – Gradski stadion
France	41
Germany	0
8 June 2024– 17:30 – Gradski stadion
Belgium	12
Great Britain	5
8 June 2024– 16:46 – Gradski stadion
Poland	19
Czech Republic	5
8 June 2024– 17:08 – Gradski stadion
Spain	33
Ireland	17

Semifinals
9 June 2024– 11:58 – Gradski stadion
France	19
Belgium	17
9 June 2024– 12:20 – Gradski stadion
Poland	26
Spain	17

Final
9 June 2024– 19:00 – Gradski stadion
France	10
Poland	12
3rd place final
9 June 2024– 18:00 – Gradski stadion
Belgium	17
Spain	10

=== Final placings ===
Place	Team
1st place, gold medalist(s)	Poland
2nd place, silver medalist(s)	France
3rd place, bronze medalist(s)	Belgium
4	Spain
5	Czech Republic
6	Germany
7	Great Britain
8	Ireland
9	Italy
10	Turkey
11	Portugal
12	Ukraine

== Hamburg ==
=== Pool A ===
Team	W	D	L	PF	PA	PD	Pts
Great Britain	3	0	0	133	5	+128	9
Germany	2	0	1	59	53	+6	7
Poland	1	0	2	65	64	+1	5
Ukraine	0	0	3	12	147	–135	3

28 June
11:28

Poland	48–0	Ukraine

Sports Park Steinwiesenweg, Hamburg

28 June
11:50

Germany	0–29	Great Britain

Sports Park Steinwiesenweg, Hamburg

28 June
16:28

Poland	0–45	Great Britain

Sports Park Steinwiesenweg, Hamburg

28 June
17:50

Germany	40–7	Ukraine

Sports Park Steinwiesenweg, Hamburg

29 June
10:58

Great Britain	59–5	Ukraine

Sports Park Steinwiesenweg, Hamburg

29 June
11:20

Poland	17–19	Germany

Sports Park Steinwiesenweg, Hamburg

=== Pool B ===
Team	W	D	L	PF	PA	PD	Pts
France	3	0	0	124	26	+98	9
Czech Republic	2	0	1	66	87	–21	7
Ireland	1	0	2	48	61	–13	5
Portugal	0	0	3	22	86	–64	3

28 June
10:44

France	38–5	Portugal

Sports Park Steinwiesenweg, Hamburg

28 June
11:06

Czech Republic	28–17	Ireland

Sports Park Steinwiesenweg, Hamburg

28 June
15:44

France	26–14	Ireland

Sports Park Steinwiesenweg, Hamburg

28 June
16:06

Czech Republic	31–10	Portugal

Sports Park Steinwiesenweg, Hamburg

29 June
10:14

France	60–7	Czech Republic

Sports Park Steinwiesenweg, Hamburg

29 June
10:36

Ireland	17–7	Portugal

Sports Park Steinwiesenweg, Hamburg

=== Pool C ===
Team	W	D	L	PF	PA	PD	Pts
Spain	3	0	0	99	5	+94	9
Belgium	2	0	1	60	27	+33	7
Italy	1	0	2	17	64	–47	5
Turkey	0	0	3	12	92	–80	3

28 June
10:00

Belgium	29–0	Turkey

Sports Park Steinwiesenweg, Hamburg

28 June
10:22

Spain	26–0	Italy

Sports Park Steinwiesenweg, Hamburg

28 June
15:00

Belgium	26–0	Italy

Sports Park Steinwiesenweg, Hamburg

28 June
15:22

Spain	46–0	Turkey

Sports Park Steinwiesenweg, Hamburg

29 June
09:30

Belgium	5–27	Spain

Sports Park Steinwiesenweg, Hamburg

29 June
09:52

Italy	17–12	Turkey

Sports Park Steinwiesenweg, Hamburg

=== 9th to 12th playoffs ===
9th place semifinals
29 June 2024– 14:30 – Sports Park Steinwiesenweg
Italy	43
Ukraine	0
29 June 2024– 14:52 – Sports Park Steinwiesenweg
Portugal	27
Turkey	0

9th place final
30 June 2024– 12:59 – Sports Park Steinwiesenweg
Italy	7
Portugal	17
11th place final
30 June 2024– 12:15 – Sports Park Steinwiesenweg
Turkey (aet)	17
Ukraine	12

=== 5th to 8th playoffs ===
5th place semifinals
30 June 2024– 09:00 – Sports Park Steinwiesenweg
Ireland	12
Germany	0
30 June 2024– 09:22 – Sports Park Steinwiesenweg
Poland	7
Czech Republic	19

5th place final
30 June 2024– 14:27 – Sports Park Steinwiesenweg
Ireland	26
Czech Republic	12
7th place final
30 June 2024– 13:43 – Sports Park Steinwiesenweg
Germany	7
Poland	15

=== Cup ===
Quarterfinals
29 June 2024– 15:14 – Sports Park Steinwiesenweg
Great Britain	21
Ireland	14
29 June 2024– 16:20 – Sports Park Steinwiesenweg
Belgium	17
Germany	7
29 June 2024– 15:36 – Sports Park Steinwiesenweg
France	38
Poland	7
29 June 2024– 15:58 – Sports Park Steinwiesenweg
Spain	33
Czech Republic	7

Semifinals
30 June 2024– 10:28 – Sports Park Steinwiesenweg
Great Britain	29
Belgium	0
30 June 2024– 10:50 – Sports Park Steinwiesenweg
France	33
Spain	0

Final
30 June 2024– 16:15 – Sports Park Steinwiesenweg
Great Britain	5
France	19
3rd place final
30 June 2024– 15:26 – Sports Park Steinwiesenweg
Belgium	10
Spain	7

=== Final placings ===
Place	Team
1st place, gold medalist(s)	France
2nd place, silver medalist(s)	Great Britain
3rd place, bronze medalist(s)	Belgium
4	Spain
5	Ireland
6	Czech Republic
7	Poland
8	Germany
9	Portugal
10	Italy
11	Turkey
12	Ukraine
