= 2019 Rugby Europe Women's Sevens Trophy =

- Hosts: Hungary; Portugal
- Date: 8–23 June
- Nations: 12

Final positions
- Champions: Germany
- Runners-up: Romania
- Third: Czech Republic

Series details
- Matches played: 68

The 2019 Rugby Europe Women's Sevens Trophy is the second division of Rugby Europe's 2019 sevens season. This edition is due to be hosted by the cities of Budapest and Lisbon on 8–23 June. The two highest-placed teams will be promoted to the 2020 Grand Prix and eligible to compete in the European Olympic qualifying tournament. The two teams with the fewest points will be relegated to the 2020 Conference.

== Schedule ==
Date	Venue	Winner	Runner-up	Third
8–9 June	(Hungary) Budapest	Germany	Romania	Czech Republic
22–23 June	(Portugal) Lisbon	Romania	Germany	Finland

== Standings ==
Legend
Promoted to 2020 Grand Prix
and Olympic qualifying tournament
Qualified for Olympic qualifying tournament
Relegated to 2020 Conference

Rank	Team	Budapest	Lisbon	Points
1st place, gold medalist(s)	Germany	20	18	38
2nd place, silver medalist(s)	Romania	18	20	38
3rd place, bronze medalist(s)	Czech Republic	16	14	30
4	Finland	14	16	30
5	Sweden	12	10	22
6	Portugal	8	12	20
7	Norway	10	8	18
8	Georgia	3	6	9
9	Turkey	6	2	8
10	Hungary	4	4	8
11	Israel	1	3	4
12	Switzerland	2	1	3

== Budapest ==
All times in Central European Summer Time (UTC+02:00)

Event	Winners	Score	Finalists	Semifinalists
Cup	Germany	20–7	Romania	Czech Republic (Third); Finland
5th Place	Sweden	29–5	Norway	Portugal (Seventh); Turkey
9th Place	Hungary	21–7	Georgia	Switzerland (Eleventh); Israel

=== Pool Stage ===
==== Pool A ====
Team	Pld	W	D	L	PF	PA	PD	Pts
Germany	3	3	0	0	103	5	+98	9
Czech Republic	3	2	0	1	57	43	+14	7
Turkey	3	1	0	2	31	51	–20	5
Switzerland	3	0	0	3	10	102	–92	3

8 June 2019
11:00

Germany	17–5	Turkey

8 June 2019
11:22

Czech Republic	33–0	Switzerland

8 June 2019
13:45

Germany	55–0	Switzerland

8 June 2019
14:07

Czech Republic	24–12	Turkey

8 June 2019
16:30

Germany	31–0	Czech Republic

8 June 2019
16:52

Switzerland	10–14	Turkey

==== Pool B ====
Team	Pld	W	D	L	PF	PA	PD	Pts
Portugal	3	3	0	0	112	12	+100	9
Finland	3	2	0	1	31	51	–20	7
Georgia	3	1	0	2	31	55	–24	5
Hungary	3	0	0	3	17	73	–56	3

8 June 2019
12:28

Portugal	38–0	Georgia

8 June 2019
12:50

Hungary	5–14	Finland

8 June 2019
15:13

Portugal	41–5	Finland

8 June 2019
15:35

Hungary	5–26	Georgia

8 June 2019
17:58

Finland	12–5	Georgia

8 June 2019
18:20

Portugal	33–7	Hungary

==== Pool C ====
Team	Pld	W	D	L	PF	PA	PD	Pts
Sweden	3	3	0	0	101	10	+91	9
Norway	3	2	0	1	31	51	–20	7
Romania	3	1	0	2	56	41	+15	5
Israel	3	0	0	3	5	91	–86	3

8 June 2019
11:44

Sweden	50–0	Israel

8 June 2019
12:06

Romania	17–19	Norway

8 June 2019
14:29

Sweden	29–0	Norway

8 June 2019
14:51

Romania	29–0	Israel

8 June 2019
17:14

Sweden	22–10	Romania

8 June 2019
17:36

Norway	12–5	Israel

=== Knockout stage ===
==== 9th Place ====
Semi-finals
9 June 2019 – 11:28
Georgia	7
Switzerland	5
9 June 2019 – 11:50
Hungary	14
Israel	10

Ninth place
9 June 2019 – 15:03
Georgia	7
Hungary	21
Eleventh place
9 June 2019 – 14:41
Switzerland	12
Israel	7

==== 5th Place ====
Semi-finals
9 June 2019 – 13:12
Turkey	0
Norway	12
9 June 2019 – 13:35
Portugal	0
Sweden	12

Fifth place
9 June 2019 – 16:22
Norway	5
Sweden	29
Seventh place
9 June 2019 – 16:00
Turkey	7
Portugal	38

==== Cup ====
Quarter-finals
9 June 2019 – 9:55
Germany	33
Turkey	0
9 June 2019 – 11:06
Finland	17
Norway	10
9 June 2019 – 10:22
Portugal	7
Romania	14
9 June 2019 – 10:44
Sweden	0
Czech Republic	5

Semi-finals
9 June 2019 – 13:57
Germany	25
Finland	5
9 June 2019 – 14:19
Romania	12
Czech Republic	7

Final
9 June 2019 – 17:06
Germany	20
Romania	7
Third place
9 June 2019 – 16:44
Finland	0
Czech Republic	25

== Lisbon ==
All times in Western European Summer Time (UTC+01:00)

Event	Winners	Score	Finalists	Semifinalists
Cup	Romania	22–5	Germany	Finland (third); Czech Republic
5th place	Portugal	43–0	Sweden	Norway (seventh); Georgia
9th place	Hungary	12–7	Israel	Turkey (eleventh); Switzerland

=== Pool Stage ===
==== Pool A ====
Team	Pld	W	D	L	PF	PA	PD	Pts
Germany	3	3	0	0	58	24	+34	9
Portugal	3	2	0	1	72	14	+58	7
Norway	3	1	0	2	26	53	–27	5
Israel	3	0	0	3	19	84	–65	3

22 June 2019
12:28

Germany	22–5	Israel

Referee: Petra Druskovic (Croatia)

22 June 2019
12:50

Norway	0–17	Portugal

Referee: Aneta Bejm (Poland)

22 June 2019
15:13

Norway	19–14	Israel

Referee: Elin Persson (Sweden)

22 June 2019
15:35

Germany	14–12	Portugal

Referee: Miriam de la Rubia (Spain)

22 June 2019
17:58

Germany	22–7	Norway

Referee: Riette Meijer (Netherlands)

22 June 2019
18:20

Portugal	43–0	Israel

Referee: Maria Latos (Germany)

==== Pool B ====
Team	Pld	W	D	L	PF	PA	PD	Pts
Romania	3	3	0	0	63	17	+46	9
Sweden	3	2	0	1	75	20	+55	7
Turkey	3	1	0	2	20	80	–60	5
Switzerland	3	0	0	3	17	58	–41	3

22 June 2019
11:44

Romania	19–0	Switzerland

Referee: Elin Persson (Sweden)

22 June 2019
12:06

Sweden	39–0	Turkey

Referee: Miriam de la Rubia (Spain)

22 June 2019
14:29

Romania	29–5	Turkey

Referee: Maria Latos (Germany)

22 June 2019
14:51

Sweden	24–5	Switzerland

Referee: Riette Meijer (Netherlands)

22 June 2019
17:14

Romania	15–12	Sweden

Referee: Petra Druskovic (Croatia)

22 June 2019
17:36

Turkey	15–12	Switzerland

Referee: Aneta Bejm (Poland)

==== Pool C ====
Team	Pld	W	D	L	PF	PA	PD	Pts
Czech Republic	3	3	0	0	93	36	+57	9
Finland	3	2	0	1	65	51	+14	7
Georgia	3	1	0	2	40	52	–12	5
Hungary	3	0	0	3	29	88	–59	3

22 June 2019
11:00

Czech Republic	21–19	Georgia

Referee: Maria Latos (Germany)

22 June 2019
11:22

Finland	41–5	Hungary

Referee: Riette Meijer (Netherlands)

22 June 2019
13:45

Czech Republic	33–17	Hungary

Referee: Petra Druskovic (Croatia)

22 June 2019
14:07

Finland	19–0	Georgia

Referee: Aneta Bejm (Poland)

22 June 2019
16:30

Czech Republic	39–0	Finland

Referee: Elin Persson (Sweden)

22 June 2019
16:52

Hungary	7–14	Georgia

Referee: Miriam de la Rubia (Spain)

=== Knockout stage ===
==== 9th Place ====
Semi-finals
23 June 2019 – 11:28
Turkey	0
Israel	5
23 June 2019 – 11:50
Switzerland	0
Hungary	28

Fifth place
23 June 2019 – 15:41
Israel	7
Hungary	12
Seventh place
23 June 2019 – 15:19
Turkey	15
Switzerland	10

==== 5th Place ====
Semi-finals
23 June 2019 – 12:45
Norway	5
Sweden	12
23 June 2019 – 13:07
Georgia	0
Portugal	26

Ninth place
23 June 2019 – 17:31
Sweden	0
Portugal	43
Eleventh place
23 June 2019 – 17:09
Norway	14
Georgia	5

==== Cup ====
Quarter-finals
23 June 2019 – 10:00
Germany	22
Norway	0
23 June 2019 – 11:06
Sweden	7
Finland	14
23 June 2019 – 10:22
Romania	33
Georgia	0
23 June 2019 – 10:44
Czech Republic	7
Portugal	0

Semi-finals
23 June 2019 – 13:29
Germany	20
Finland	12
23 June 2019 – 13:51
Romania	19
Czech Republic	0

Final
23 June 2019 – 18:18
Germany	5
Romania	22
Third place
23 June 2019 – 17:53
Finland	14
Czech Republic	12
