= 2021 Rugby Europe Women's Sevens Trophy =

- Hosts: Croatia; Hungary
- Date: June 19-21 & July 9-10
- Nations: 10

Final positions
- Champions: Ukraine
- Runners-up: Czech Republic
- Third: Sweden

Series details
- Matches played: 53

The 2021 Rugby Europe Women's Sevens Trophy was held in Zagreb, Croatia and in Budapest, Hungary. The first leg of the tournament was in Zagreb and the second leg was in Budapest.

== Schedule ==
Date	Venue	Winner	Runner-up	Third
June 19-21	(Croatia) Zagreb	Czech Republic	Ukraine	Sweden
July 9-10	(Hungary) Budapest	Ukraine	Czech Republic	Sweden

== Standings ==
Rank	Team	Zagreb	Budapest	Points
1st place, gold medalist(s)	Ukraine	18	20	38
2nd place, silver medalist(s)	Czech Republic	20	18	38
3rd place, bronze medalist(s)	Sweden	16	16	32
4	Finland	14	14	28
5	Hungary	12	12	24
6	Turkey	10	4	14
7	Georgia	8	6	14
8	Norway	4	10	14
9	Denmark	4	8	12
10	Moldova	6	3	9

== Zagreb ==
All times in Central European Time (UTC+01:00). The Czech Republic won the first leg.

=== Pool stages ===
==== Pool A ====
Team	Pld	W	D	L	PD	Pts
Ukraine	3	3	0	0	126	9
Sweden	3	2	0	1	-4	7
Georgia	3	1	0	2	-29	5
Moldova	3	0	0	3	-93	3

June 19
10:30:00 (Local)

Ukraine	57–0	Moldova

Stadion NŠC Stjepan Spajić, Zagreb, Croatia

June 19
10:52:00 (Local)

Sweden	10–5	Georgia

Stadion NŠC Stjepan Spajić

June 19
13:00:00 (Local)

Ukraine	38–0	Georgia

Stadion NŠC Stjepan Spajić

June 19
13:22:00 (Local)

Sweden	22–0	Moldova

Stadion NŠC Stjepan Spajić

June 20
15:30:00 (Local)

Georgia	24–10	Moldova

Stadion NŠC Stjepan Spajić

June 20
15:52:00 (Local)

Ukraine	38–7	Sweden

Stadion NŠC Stjepan Spajić

==== Pool B ====
Team	Pld	W	D	L	PD	Pts
Czech Republic	3	3	0	0	112	9
Finland	3	2	0	1	10	7
Hungary	3	1	0	2	-54	5
Turkey	3	0	0	3	-68	3

June 19
11:14:00 (Local)

Czech Republic	55–0	Turkey

Stadion NŠC Stjepan Spajić

June 19
11:36:00 (Local)

Finland	26–0	Hungary

Stadion NŠC Stjepan Spajić

June 19
13:44:00 (Local)

Czech Republic	38–5	Hungary

Stadion NŠC Stjepan Spajić

June 20
14:06:00 (Local)

Finland	22–14	Turkey

Stadion NŠC Stjepan Spajić

June 20
16:14:00 (Local)

Hungary	26–21	Turkey

Stadion NŠC Stjepan Spajić

June 20
16:36:00 (Local)

Czech Republic	24–0	Finland

Stadion NŠC Stjepan Spajić

=== Knockout stages ===
==== 5th place ====
Semi-finals
June 20 – 13:30:00 (Local)
Hungary	19
Moldova	5
June 20 – 13:52:00 (Local)
Turkey	17
Georgia	0

Fifth place
9 June 2019 – 16:52:00 (Local)
Hungary	17
Turkey	14
Seventh place
9 June 2019 – 16:30:00 (Local)
Georgia	31
Moldova	5

==== Cup ====
Quarter-finals
June 20 – 10:30:00 (Local)
Ukraine	37
Turkey	0
June 20 – 10:52:00 (Local)
Czech Republic	34
Moldova	0
June 20 – 11:14:00 (Local)
Sweden	33
Hungary	7
June 20 – 11:36:00 (Local)
Finland	22
Georgia	0

Semi-finals
June 20 – 14:14:00 (Local)
Czech Republic	24
Sweden	0
June 20 – 14:36:00 (Local)
Ukraine	12
Finland	10

Final
June 20 – 17:55:00 (Local)
Czech Republic	12
Ukraine	7
Third place
June 20 – 17:14:00 (Local)
Sweden	17
Finland	12

== Budapest ==
All times in Central European Time (UTC+01:00)

=== Pool stages ===
==== Pool A ====
Team	Pld	W	D	L	PD	Pts
Finland	4	4	0	0	77	12
Czech Republic	4	3	0	1	81	10
Norway	4	2	0	2	9	8
Hungary	4	1	0	3	-14	6
Moldova	4	0	0	4	-153	4

July 9
11:00:00 (Local)

Czech Republic	22–0	Norway

Budapest Rugby Center

July 9
11:44:00 (Local)

Finland	20–0	Hungary

Budapest Rugby Center

July 9
13:00:00 (Local)

Czech Republic	37–0	Moldova

Budapest Rugby Center

July 9
13:44:00 (Local)

Finland	17–0	Norway

Budapest Rugby Center

July 10
15:30:00 (Local)

Hungary	47–0	Moldova

Budapest Rugby Center

July 10
16:14:00 (Local)

Czech Republic	7–12	Finland

Budapest Rugby Center

July 10
17:30:00 (Local)

Hungary	0–14	Norway

Budapest Rugby Center

July 10
18:14:00 (Local)

Finland	35–0	Moldova

Budapest Rugby Center

July 10
08:30:00 (Local)

Czech Republic	32–5	Hungary

Budapest Rugby Center

July 10
09:14:00 (Local)

Moldova	0–34	Norway

Budapest Rugby Center

==== Pool B ====
Team	Pld	W	D	L	PD	Pts
Sweden	4	4	0	0	77	12
Ukraine	4	3	0	1	72	10
Georgia	4	1	0	3	21	6
Denmark	4	1	0	3	-40	6
Turkey	4	1	0	3	-88	6

July 9
11:22:00 (Local)

Ukraine	28–0	Denmark

Budapest Rugby Center

July 9
12:06:00 (Local)

Sweden	24–0	Turkey

Budapest Rugby Center

July 9
13:22:00 (Local)

Ukraine	17–5	Georgia

Budapest Rugby Center

July 10
14:06:00 (Local)

Sweden	31–7	Denmark

Budapest Rugby Center

July 10
15:52:00 (Local)

Turkey	12–5	Georgia

Budapest Rugby Center

July 10
16:36:00 (Local)

Ukraine	0–10	Sweden

Budapest Rugby Center

July 10
17:52:00 (Local)

Turkey	0–29	Denmark

Budapest Rugby Center

July 10
18:36:00 (Local)

Sweden	24–5	Georgia

Budapest Rugby Center

July 10
08:52:00 (Local)

Ukraine	42–0	Turkey

Budapest Rugby Center

July 10
09:36:00 (Local)

Georgia	17–0	Denmark

Budapest Rugby Center

=== Knockout stages ===
==== 5th place ====
Semi-finals
July 10 – 12:12:00 (Local)
Norway	19
Denmark	0
July 10 – 12:34:00 (Local)
Hungary	17
Georgia	7

Fifth place
July 10 – 17:26:00 (Local)
Hungary	17
Norway	12
Seventh place
July 10 – 17:04:00 (Local)
Denmark	19
Georgia	7

==== Cup ====
Semi-finals
July 10 – 10:56 UTC; 12:56:00 (Local)
Ukraine	36
Finland	0
July 10 – 11:14 UTC; 13:14:00 (Local)
Czech Republic	26
Sweden	0

Final
July 10 – 18:34 UTC; 20:34:00 (Local)
Ukraine	14
Czech Republic	5
Third place
July 10 – 18:10 UTC; 20:10:00 (Local)
Sweden	10
Finland	5

==== 9-10 place ====
Turkey 41-0 Moldova
