= 2022 Rugby Europe Women's Sevens Trophy =

- Hosts: Croatia; Hungary
- Date: June 11-19
- Nations: 12

Final positions
- Champions: England
- Runners-up: Italy
- Third: Portugal

The 2022 Rugby Europe Women's Sevens Trophy was held in Zagreb, Croatia and in Budapest, Hungary. The first leg of the tournament was in Zagreb and the second leg was in Budapest.

== Schedule ==
Date	Venue	Winner	Runner-up	Third
June 11-12	(Croatia) Zagreb	England	Italy	Portugal
June 17-19	(Hungary) Budapest	England	Italy	Sweden

== Standings ==
Rank	Team	Zagreb	Budapest	Points
1st place, gold medalist(s)	England	20	20	40
2nd place, silver medalist(s)	Italy	18	18	36
3rd place, bronze medalist(s)	Portugal	16	14	30
4	Sweden	14	16	30
5	Turkey	12	12	24
6	Norway	6	10	16
7	Georgia	8	6	14
8	Hungary	4	8	12
9	Finland	10	1	11
10	Denmark	2	4	6
11	Moldova	3	2	5
12	Israel	1	3	4

== Results ==
- https://www.rugbyeurope.eu/women-s-7s-trophy-2022/women-s-7s-trophy-zagreb/
- https://www.rugbyeurope.eu/women-s-7s-trophy-2022/women-s-7s-trophy/
