= 2013 FIRA-AER Women's Sevens – Division B =

International women's rugby sevens competition

- Host nation: Slovakia
- Date: May 25–26 2013

Cup
- Champion: Finland
- Runner-up: Norway
- Third: Israel

Plate
- Winner: Latvia
- Runner-up: Malta

Bowl
- Winner: Luxembourg
- Runner-up: Slovakia

The 2013 FIRA-AER Women's Sevens – Division B was the third level of international women's rugby sevens competitions organised by FIRA-AER during 2013. It featured one tournament hosted in Bratislava. The winners and runners up, Finland and Norway respectively, were promoted to the 2014 Division A.

== Pool stages ==
=== Pool A ===
Nation	Won	Drawn	Lost	For	Against
Bulgaria	4	1	0	89	61
Israel	4	0	1	118	26
Latvia	3	0	2	107	44
Andorra	1	1	3	48	106
Slovakia	1	0	4	43	85
Luxembourg	1	0	4	57	140

- Slovakia 24-14 Luxembourg
- Bulgaria 12-7 Israel
- Latvia 34-0 Andorra
- Israel 38-0 Luxembourg
- Slovakia 0-10 Andorra
- Latvia 14-15 Bulgaria
- Andorra 17-22 Luxembourg
- Latvia 7-15 Israel
- Bulgaria 22-12 Slovakia
- Israel 36-7 Andorra
- Bulgaria 26-14 Luxembourg
- Latvia 17-7 Slovakia
- Bulgaria 14-14 Andorra
- Slovakia 0-22 Israel
- Latvia 35-7 Luxembourg

=== Group B ===
Nation	Won	Drawn	Lost	For	Against
Finland	5	0	0	171	14
Norway	4	0	1	159	25
Malta	3	0	2	156	51
Turkey	2	0	3	75	14
Lithuania	1	0	4	41	158
Bosnia and Herzegovina	0	0	45	0	240

- Malta 31-5 Turkey
- Finland 50-0 Lithuania
- Norway 51-0 Bosnia & Herzegovina
- Lithuania 0-22 Turkey
- Malta 59-0 Bosnia & Herzegovina
- Norway 7-15 Finland
- Bosnia & Herzegovina 0-43 Turkey
- Norway 32-0 Lithuania
- Finland 22-7 Malta
- Lithuania 41-0 Bosnia & Herzegovina
- Finland 38-0 Turkey
- Norway 24-5 Malta
- Finland 46- Bosnia & Herzegovina
- Malta 54-0 Lithuania
- Norway 45-5 Turkey

== Knockout stage ==
=== Bowl ===
Semi-finals:

- Slovakia 36-0 Bosnia & Herzegovina
- Luxembourg 21-5 Lithuania

11th-place play-off

- Bosnia & Herzegovina 0-47 Lithuania

Final (9th-place play-off)

- Slovakia 17-22 Luxembourg

=== Plate ===
Semi-finals:

- Latvia 36-7 Turkey
- Andorra 0-31 Malta

7th-place play-off

- Turkey 10-5 Andorra

Final (5th-place play-off)

- Latvia 25-10 Malta

=== Cup ===
Semi-finals:

- Bulgaria 0-45 Norway
- Israel 0-17 Finland

3rd-place play-off

- Bulgaria 5-10 Israel

Final

- Norway 12-25 Finland
