= 2018 Rugby Europe Women's Sevens Conference =

- Hosts: Croatia
- Date: 8–9 June

Final positions
- Champions: Georgia
- Runners-up: Turkey
- Third: Croatia

Series details
- Matches played: 34

The 2018 Rugby Europe Women's Conference is the third division of the 2018 season of the Rugby Europe Women's Sevens. The tournament will be held in Zagreb, Croatia on 8–9 June, with the two highest-placing teams promoted to the 2019 Trophy.

== Pool stage ==
=== Pool A ===
Team	Pld	W	D	L	PF	PA	PD	Pts
Bulgaria	3	2	0	1	63	48	15	7
Turkey	3	2	0	1	51	41	10	7
Malta	3	1	0	2	38	46	-8	5
Andorra	3	1	0	2	41	58	-17	5

8 June 2018	Malta	7-17	Turkey
10:00

8 June 2018	Bulgaria	19-22	Andorra
10:22

8 June 2018	Malta	17-12	Andorra
12:45

8 June 2018	Bulgaria	27-12	Turkey
13:07

8 June 2018	Andorra	7-22	Turkey
15:52

8 June 2018	Malta	14-17	Bulgaria
15:30

=== Pool B ===
Team	Pld	W	D	L	PF	PA	PD	Pts
Croatia	3	3	0	0	88	0	88	9
Slovakia	3	1	0	2	41	50	9	5
Moldova	3	1	0	2	24	62	-38	5
Lithuania	3	1	0	2	21	62	-41	5

8 June 2018	Moldova	5-21	Lithuania
11:28

8 June 2018	Croatia	31-0	Slovakia
11:50

8 June 2018	Moldova	19-10	Slovakia
14:13

8 June 2018	Croatia	26-0	Lithuania
14:35

8 June 2018	Slovakia	31-0	Lithuania
16:58

8 June 2018	Moldova	0-31	Croatia
17:20

=== Pool C ===
Team	Pld	W	D	L	PF	PA	PD	Pts
Denmark	3	3	0	0	86	0	86	9
Georgia	3	2	0	1	74	27	47	7
Slovenia	3	1	0	2	27	102	-75	5
Luxembourg	3	0	0	3	12	70	-58	2

8 June 2018	Georgia	50-10	Slovenia
10:44

8 June 2018	Denmark	29-0	Luxembourg
11:06

8 June 2018	Georgia	24-0	Luxembourg
13:29

8 June 2018	Denmark	40-0	Slovenia
13:51

8 June 2018	Luxembourg	12-17	Slovenia
16:36

8 June 2018	Georgia	0-17	Denmark
16:14

== Knockout stage ==
=== Challenge Trophy ===
Semi-finals
9 June 2018 – 11:28
Slovenia	5
Luxembourg	17
9 June 2018 – 11:50
Andorra	17
Lithuania	5

Final
9 June 2017 – 15:05
Luxembourg	5
Andorra	12
Third place
9 June 2018 – 14:43
Slovenia	5
Lithuania	17

=== 5th Place ===
Semi-finals
9 June 2018 – 13:15
Moldova	12
Slovakia	5
9 June 2018 – 13:37
Malta	0
Denmark	40

Final
9 June 2018 – 16:26
Moldova	0
Denmark	22
Third place
9 June 2018 – 16:02
Slovakia	14
Malta	7

=== Cup ===
Quarter-finals
9 June 2018 – 10:00
Bulgaria	19
Moldova	7
9 June 2018 – 11:06
Slovakia	5
Georgia	7
9 June 2018– 10:22
Croatia	17
Malta	12
9 June 2018 – 10:44
Denmark	14
Turkey	19

Semi-finals
9 June 2018 – 13:59
Bulgaria	5
Georgia	19
9 June 2018 – 14:21
Croatia	10
Turkey	12

Final
9 June 2018 – 17:36
Georgia	17
Turkey	12
Third place
9 June 2018 – 16:50
Bulgaria	7
Croatia	38

== Final standings ==
Legend
Promoted to 2019 Trophy series

Rank	Team
1st place, gold medalist(s)	Georgia
2nd place, silver medalist(s)	Turkey
3rd place, bronze medalist(s)	Croatia
4	Bulgaria
5	Denmark
6	Moldova
7	Slovakia
8	Malta
9	Andorra
10	Luxembourg
11	Lithuania
12	Slovenia
