= 2019 Rugby Europe Women's Sevens Olympic Qualifying Tournament =

- Hosts: Russia
- Date: 13–14 July
- Nations: 12

Final positions
- Champions: England
- Runners-up: Russia
- Third: France

Series details
- Matches played: 34

The 2019 Rugby Europe Women's Sevens Olympic Qualifying Tournament was held on 13–14 July in Kazan at Central Stadium. The champion of the tournament will be eligible to qualify for the European spot in the 2020 Summer Olympics. The two runners-up will be eligible for bids at a 2020 Olympic repechage tournament.

== Teams ==
Twelve teams take part in the tournament, of which seven teams qualified through the 2019 Marcoussis Sevens, and are seeded according to their placements. The remaining five spots were awarded based upon performance in the Trophy and Conference tournaments.

Seedings

1. France (Marcoussis winner)
2. Russia (Marcoussis runner-up)
3. Spain (Marcoussis 3rd)
4. Ireland (Marcoussis 4th)
5. England (Marcoussis 5th) (Note: By agreement between the three unions on the island of Great Britain (England, Scotland, Wales), England represented Great Britain in qualifying for the 2020 Olympic Sevens. The final make-up of the Great Britain women's team was determined by the British Olympic Association.)
6. Poland (Marcoussis 7th)
7. Italy (Marcoussis 9th)
8. Germany (Trophy winner)
9. Romania (Trophy runner-up)
10. Czech Republic (Trophy 3rd)
11. Sweden (Trophy 5th)
12. Moldova (Conference winner)

== Pool stage ==
All times in Moscow Time (UTC+03:00)

=== Pool A ===
Team	Pld	W	D	L	PF	PA	PD	Pts
France	3	3	0	0	125	5	+120	9
Poland	3	2	0	1	67	46	+21	7
Italy	3	1	0	2	48	69	-21	5
Moldova	3	0	0	3	5	125	-120	3

13 July 2019
11:00

France	54–0	Moldova

Central Stadium, Kazan
Referee: Clara Munarini (Italy)

13 July 2019
11:22

Poland	29–10	Italy

Central Stadium, Kazan
Referee: Kathie Pickert (Germany)

13 July 2019
13:45

France	40–0	Italy

Central Stadium, Kazan
Referee: Hollie Davidson (Scotland)

13 July 2019
14:07

Poland	33–5	Moldova

Central Stadium, Kazan
Referee: Joy Neville (Ireland)

13 July 2019
16:30

France	31–5	Poland

Central Stadium, Kazan
Referee: Kathie Pickert (Germany)

13 July 2019
16:52

Italy	38–0	Moldova

Central Stadium, Kazan
Referee: Katherine Ritchie (England)

=== Pool B ===
Team	Pld	W	D	L	PF	PA	PD	Pts
Russia	3	3	0	0	110	5	+105	9
England	3	2	0	1	114	26	+88	7
Sweden	3	1	0	2	29	84	-55	5
Germany	3	0	0	3	5	143	-138	3

13 July 2019
12:28

England	59–0	Germany

Central Stadium, Kazan
Referee: Joy Neville (Ireland)

13 July 2019
12:50

Russia	29–0	Sweden

Central Stadium, Kazan
Referee: Sara Cox (England)

13 July 2019
15:13

England	50–0	Sweden

Central Stadium, Kazan
Referee: Kathie Pickert (Germany)

13 July 2019
15:35

Russia	55–0	Germany

Central Stadium, Kazan
Referee: Katherine Ritchie (England)

13 July 2019
17:58

Germany	5–29	Sweden

Central Stadium, Kazan
Referee: Clara Munarini (Italy)

13 July 2019
18:20

Russia	26–5	England

Central Stadium, Kazan
Referee: Hollie Davidson (Scotland)

=== Pool C ===
Team	Pld	W	D	L	PF	PA	PD	Pts
Spain	3	3	0	0	89	12	+77	9
Ireland	3	2	0	1	103	19	+84	7
Romania	3	1	0	2	34	88	-54	5
Czech Republic	3	0	0	3	12	119	-107	3

13 July 2019
11:44

Spain	35–7	Czech Republic

Central Stadium, Kazan
Referee: Katherine Ritchie (England)

13 July 2019
12:06

Ireland	48–0	Romania

Central Stadium, Kazan
Referee: Hollie Davidson (Scotland)

13 July 2019
14:39

Spain	35–0	Romania

Central Stadium, Kazan
Referee: Sara Cox (England)

13 July 2019
14:51

Ireland	50–0	Czech Republic

Central Stadium, Kazan
Referee: Clara Munarini (Italy)

13 July 2019
17:14

Spain	19–5	Ireland

Central Stadium, Kazan
Referee: Sara Cox (England)

13 July 2019
17:36

Romania	34–5	Czech Republic

Central Stadium, Kazan
Referee: Joy Neville (Ireland)

== Knockout stage ==
=== Bowl ===
Semi-finals
14 July – 11:28 – Central Stadium
Sweden	12
Germany	0
14 July – 11:50 – Central Stadium
Czech Republic	0
Moldova	12

Bowl final
14 July – 15:05 – Central Stadium
Sweden	27
Moldova	7
Eleventh place
14 July – 14:43 – Central Stadium
Germany	15
Czech Republic	7

=== Plate ===
Semi-finals
14 July – 13:15 – Central Stadium
Romania	0
Ireland	48
14 July – 13:37 – Central Stadium
Italy	5
Poland	12

Plate final
14 July – 16:24 – Central Stadium
Ireland	33
Poland	5
Seventh place
14 July – 16:02 – Central Stadium
Romania	14
Italy	29

=== Cup ===
Quarter-finals
14 July – 10:00 – Central Stadium
France	55
Romania	0
14 July – 11:06 – Central Stadium
England	17
Ireland	7
14 July – 10:22 – Central Stadium
Russia	44
Italy	0
14 July – 10:44 – Central Stadium
Spain	17
Poland	14

Semi-finals
14 July – 13:59 – Central Stadium
France	12
England	14
14 July – 14:21 – Central Stadium
Russia	12
Spain	5

Final
14 July – 17:11 – Central Stadium
England	19
Russia	0
Third place
14 July – 16:46 – Central Stadium
France	17
Spain	5

== Standings ==
Legend
Green fill	Qualified for the 2020 Olympics
Blue fill	Qualified for the 2020 Repechage

Rank	Team
1st place, gold medalist(s)	England
2nd place, silver medalist(s)	Russia
3rd place, bronze medalist(s)	France
4	Spain
5	Ireland
6	Poland
7	Italy
8	Romania
9	Sweden
10	Moldova
11	Germany
12	Czech Republic
