= 2023 Rugby Europe Women's Sevens Championship Series =

Rugby tournaments

- Hosts: Portugal; Germany
- Date: 9 June – 9 July
- Nations: 12

Final positions
- Champions: France
- Runners-up: Spain
- Third: Great Britain

Team changes
- Relegated: Sweden; Romania

The 2023 Rugby Europe Women's Sevens Championship Series was the 2023 edition of the continental championship for rugby sevens in Europe. The series took place over two legs, the first at Algarve in Portugal and the second at Hamburg in Germany.

France were crowned Series champions after winning both tournaments in Algrave and Hamburg.

== Teams ==
The current list of teams confirmed to be participating in the Women's Sevens Championship Series.

Great Britain, will participate after England, Scotland and Wales decided to combine.

Italy, Portugal and Sweden were promoted from the 2022 Rugby Europe Women's Sevens Trophy, as they were the three highest-ranked teams from the two-legged series.

- Belgium
- Czech Republic
- France
- Germany
- Great Britain
- Ireland
- Italy
- Poland
- Portugal
- Romania
- Spain
- Sweden

== Schedule ==
The official schedule for the 2023 Rugby Europe Sevens Championship Series was:

2023 Series schedule
Leg	Stadium	City	Dates	Winners	Runners-up	Third place
Portugal	Complexo Desportivo de Vila Real de Santo António	Algarve	9–11 June	France	Great Britain	Ireland
Germany	Sports Park Steinwiesenweg	Hamburg	7–9 July	France	Spain	Belgium

== Standings ==
2023 Rugby Europe Sevens Championship
Pos	Event Team	Algarve	Hamburg	Points total
1	France	20	20	40
2	Spain	12	18	30
3	Great Britain	18	12	30
4	Poland	14	14	28
5	Belgium	10	16	26
6	Ireland	16	6	22
7	Czech Republic	6	10	16
8	Germany	8	8	16
9	Italy	4	4	8
10	Portugal	3	3	6
11	Sweden	2	2	4
12	Romania	1	1	2

Legend
Blue fill	Entry to World Challenger Series
Dark bar	Already a core team for the 2023–24 World Rugby Women's Sevens Series
Red fill	Relegated to 2024 European Trophy

== First leg – Algarve ==
=== Pool stage ===
==== Pool A ====
Team	Pld	W	D	L	PF	PA	PD	Pts
Poland	3	3	0	0	77	24	+53	9
Belgium	3	2	0	1	44	36	+8	7
Czech Republic	3	1	0	2	53	46	+9	5
Romania	3	0	0	3	22	92	-70	3

Poland	43–5	Romania

Belgium	22–7	Czech Republic

Poland	17–12	Czech Republic

Belgium	15–12	Romania

Poland	17–7	Belgium

Czech Republic	34–5	Romania

==== Pool B ====
Team	Pld	W	D	L	PF	PA	PD	Pts
Ireland	3	2	1	0	82	17	+65	8
Spain	3	2	1	0	60	17	+43	8
Germany	3	1	0	2	38	70	-32	5
Sweden	3	0	0	3	5	81	-76	3

Ireland	27–0	Sweden

Spain	22–5	Germany

Ireland	43–5	Germany

Spain	26–0	Sweden

Spain	12–12	Ireland

Germany	28–5	Sweden

==== Pool C ====
Team	Pld	W	D	L	PF	PA	PD	Pts
France	3	3	0	0	111	12	+99	9
Great Britain	3	2	0	1	86	43	+43	7
Portugal	3	1	0	2	24	90	-66	5
Italy	3	0	0	3	17	93	-76	3

France	31–0	Italy

Great Britain	31–5	Portugal

Great Britain	43–5	Italy

France	47–0	Portugal

Great Britain	12–33	France

Italy	12–19	Portugal

=== Knockout stage ===
==== 9th Place ====
Semi-finals
Portugal	22
Sweden	7
Romania	0
Italy	20

Ninth place
Portugal	14
Italy	34
Eleventh place
Sweden (aet)	17
Romania	12

==== 5th Place ====
Semi-finals
Spain	38
Germany	14
Czech Republic	7
Belgium	12

Fifth place
Spain	12
Belgium	0
Seventh place
Germany (aet)	17
Czech Republic	12

==== Cup ====
Quarter-finals
Poland	31
Germany	0
Spain	10
Great Britain	14
Ireland	22
Czech Republic	5
France	36
Belgium	0

Semi-finals
Poland	7
Great Britain	31
Ireland	0
France	29

Final
Great Britain	7
France	19
Third place
Poland	7
Ireland	20

== Second leg – Hamburg ==
=== Pool stage ===
==== Pool A ====
Team	Pld	W	D	L	PF	PA	PD	Pts
France	3	3	0	0	129	5	+134	9
Belgium	3	2	0	1	43	72	-29	7
Germany	3	1	0	2	29	62	-33	5
Romania	3	0	0	3	12	84	-72	3

France	41–0	Romania

Belgium	14–10	Germany

Belgium	24–12	Romania

France	48–0	Germany

France	50–5	Belgium

Germany	19–0	Romania

==== Pool B ====
Team	Pld	W	D	L	PF	PA	PD	Pts
Spain	3	3	0	0	95	26	+69	9
Great Britain	3	2	0	1	52	47	+5	7
Czech Republic	3	1	0	2	39	58	-19	5
Sweden	3	0	0	3	22	77	-55	3

Great Britain	19–10	Sweden

Spain	32–7	Czech Republic

Great Britain	19–15	Czech Republic

Spain	41–5	Sweden

Czech Republic	17–7	Sweden

Great Britain	14–22	Spain

==== Pool C ====
Team	Pld	W	D	L	PF	PA	PD	Pts
Ireland	3	2	0	1	68	41	+27	7
Poland	3	2	0	1	86	36	+50	7
Italy	3	1	0	2	34	74	-40	5
Portugal	3	1	0	2	41	78	-37	5

Ireland	32–5	Portugal

Poland	38–0	Italy

Ireland	19–24	Italy

Poland	36–19	Portugal

Italy	10–17	Portugal

Ireland	17–12	Poland

=== Knockout stage ===
==== 9th Place ====
Semi-finals
Portugal	27
Romania	0
Italy	29
Sweden	7

Ninth place
Portugal	19
Italy	28
Eleventh place
Romania	5
Sweden	15

==== 5th Place ====
Semi-finals
Germany	12
Great Britain	22
Czech Republic	29
Ireland	12

Fifth place
Great Britain	19
Czech Republic	12
Seventh place
Germany	15
Ireland	5

==== Cup ====
Quarter-finals
France	52
Germany	0
Great Britain	10
Poland	17
Spain	12
Czech Republic	10
Ireland	19
Belgium	22

Semi-finals
France	49
Poland	7
Spain	17
Belgium	12

Final
France	26
Spain	7
Third place
Poland	14
Belgium	20
