= 2024 World Rugby Sevens Challenger Series – Women's tour =

Rugby sevens competition

2024 World Rugby Sevens Challenger Series
- Women's tour – Series III
- Hosts: United Arab Emirates; Uruguay; Poland
- Date: 12 January–19 May 2024
- Nations: 12

Final positions
- Champions: China
- Runners-up: Argentina
- Third: Belgium

Team changes
- Promoted: China

The 2024 World Rugby Sevens Challenger Series for women's rugby sevens teams was the third season of the second-tier World Rugby Sevens Challenger Series that allowed a promotion pathway to the top-level SVNS.

The women's challenger tour had 12 national teams competing and was played as three tournaments in Dubai, Montevideo and Kraków. The top four team gained entry to the 2024 Spain Sevens core team qualifier.

== Teams ==
There were 12 women's national teams competing in the Challenger Series for 2024.

Date qualified	Means of qualification	Nation
18 June 2023	2023 Sudamérica Rugby Women's Sevens	Argentina
18 June 2023	2023 Sudamérica Rugby Women's Sevens	Paraguay
9 July 2023	2023 Rugby Europe Women's Sevens Championship Series	Poland
9 July 2023	2023 Rugby Europe Women's Sevens Championship Series	Belgium
9 July 2023	2023 Rugby Europe Women's Sevens Championship Series	Czech Republic
20 August 2023	2023 RAN Women's Sevens	Mexico
15 October 2023	2023 Africa Women's Sevens	Kenya
15 October 2023	2023 Africa Women's Sevens	Uganda
15 October 2023	2023 Asia Rugby Women's Sevens Series	Hong Kong
15 October 2023	2023 Asia Rugby Women's Sevens Series	China
15 October 2023	2023 Asia Rugby Women's Sevens Series	Thailand
12 November 2023	2023 Oceania Women's Sevens Championship	Papua New Guinea
Totals	6	12

== Schedule ==
The official schedule for the 2024 World Rugby Sevens Challenger Series is:

2024 Itinerary
Leg	City	Stadium	Dates	Winner
1	Dubai	The Sevens Stadium	12–14 January	China
2	Montevideo	Estadio Charrúa	8–10 March	China
3	Kraków	Stadion Miejski im. Henryka Reymana	18–19 May	China

== Standings ==
2024 World Rugby Sevens Challenger Series – Women's Series III
Pos	Event Team	Dubai	Montevideo	Kraków	Total points
1	China	20	20	20	60
2	Argentina	16	18	12	46
3	Belgium	12	16	16	44
4	Poland	10	12	18	40
5	Kenya	18	6	14	38
6	Uganda	14	14	8	36
7	Thailand	8	10	4	22
8	Czech Republic	6	3	10	19
9	Hong Kong	3	8	2	13
10	Paraguay	2	4	6	12
11	Papua New Guinea	4	1	3	8
12	Mexico	1	2	1	4

Legend
Green	Qualified for Core Team Qualifier

== Dubai ==
The first event of the series took place at The Sevens Stadium in Dubai, United Arab Emirates.

=== Pool A ===
Team	W	L	PF	PA	PD	BP	Pts
Belgium	3	0	62	22	+40	0	9
Thailand	2	1	41	24	+17	0	6
Uganda	1	2	36	50	−14	0	3
Papua New Guinea	0	3	27	70	−43	1	1

World Rugby

12 January
12:58

Thailand	15−0	Papua New Guinea

The Sevens, Dubai

12 January
13:20

Belgium	14−5	Uganda

The Sevens, Dubai

12 January
17:42

Thailand	19−7	Uganda

The Sevens, Dubai

12 January
18:04

Belgium	31−10	Papua New Guinea

The Sevens, Dubai

13 January
12:43

Papua New Guinea	17−24	Uganda

The Sevens, Dubai

13 January
13:05

Belgium	17−7	Thailand

The Sevens, Dubai

=== Pool B ===
Team	W	L	PF	PA	PD	BP	Pts
Kenya	2	1	67	24	+43	1	7
China	2	1	106	24	+82	1	7
Czech Republic	2	1	53	40	+13	0	6
Mexico	0	3	0	138	−138	0	0

World Rugby

12 January
12:14

Czech Republic	34−0	Mexico

The Sevens, Dubai

12 January
12:36

China	12−17	Kenya

The Sevens, Dubai

12 January
16:58

Czech Republic	12−10	Kenya

The Sevens, Dubai

12 January
17:20

China	64−0	Mexico

The Sevens, Dubai

13 January
11:59

Mexico	0−40	Kenya

The Sevens, Dubai

13 January
12:21

China	30−7	Czech Republic

The Sevens, Dubai

=== Pool C ===
Team	W	L	PF	PA	PD	Pts	Pts
Argentina	3	0	71	24	+47	0	9
Poland	2	1	90	24	+66	1	7
Hong Kong	1	2	17	52	−35	0	3
Paraguay	0	3	17	95	−78	0	0

World Rugby

12 January
11:30

Hong Kong	17−0	Paraguay

The Sevens, Dubai

12 January
11:52

Poland	12−19	Argentina

The Sevens, Dubai

12 January
16:14

Hong Kong	0−19	Argentina

The Sevens, Dubai

12 January
16:36

Poland	45−5	Paraguay

The Sevens, Dubai

13 January
11:15

Paraguay	12−33	Argentina

The Sevens, Dubai

13 January
11:37

Poland	33−0	Hong Kong

The Sevens, Dubai

=== 9th to 12th playoffs ===
9th place semifinals
13 January – 15:59 – The Sevens
Papua New Guinea	33
Paraguay	26
13 January – 16:21 – The Sevens
Hong Kong	22
Mexico	10

9th place final
14 January – 11:59 – The Sevens
Papua New Guinea	31
Hong Kong	0
11th place final
14 January – 11:15 – The Sevens
Paraguay	12
Mexico	5

=== 5th to 8th playoffs ===
Fifth place

14 January
15:15

Poland	5−10	Belgium

The Sevens

Seventh place

14 January
14:31

Thailand	31−12	Czech Republic

The Sevens

=== Cup ===
Quarterfinals
13 January – 16:43 – The Sevens
China	31
Poland	10
13 January – 17:05 – The Sevens
Belgium	12
Uganda	17
13 January – 17:27 – The Sevens
Argentina	22
Thailand	12
13 January – 17:49 – The Sevens
Kenya	22
Czech Republic	12

Semifinals
14 January –12:53 – The Sevens
China	45
Uganda	5
14 January –13:15 – The Sevens
Argentina	0
Kenya	17

Final
14 January –16:59 – The Sevens
China	19
Kenya	5
3rd place final
14 January –16:09 – The Sevens
Uganda	10
Argentina	36

=== Final placings ===
Place	Team
1st place, gold medalist(s)	China
2nd place, silver medalist(s)	Kenya
3rd place, bronze medalist(s)	Argentina
4	Uganda
5	Belgium
6	Poland
7	Thailand
8	Czech Republic
9	Papua New Guinea
10	Hong Kong
11	Paraguay
12	Mexico

== Montevideo ==
The second event of the series took place at Estadio Charrúa in Montevideo, Uruguay.

=== Pool A ===
Team	W	L	PF	PA	PD	Pts
China	3	0	81	32	+49	9
Poland	2	1	90	29	+61	6
Czech Republic	1	2	46	81	–35	3
Paraguay	0	3	17	92	–75	0

8 March
TBD

Poland	46–0	Czech Republic

Estadio Charrua, Montevideo

8 March
TBD

China	29–5	Paraguay

Estadio Charrua, Montevideo

8 March
TBD

Poland	32–5	Paraguay

Estadio Charrua, Montevideo

8 March
TBD

China	28–15	Czech Republic

Estadio Charrua, Montevideo

9 March
TBD

Czech Republic	31–7	Paraguay

Estadio Charrua, Montevideo

9 March
TBD

China	24–12	Poland

Estadio Charrua, Montevideo

=== Pool B ===
Team	W	L	PF	PA	PD	Pts
Belgium	3	0	82	15	+67	9
Hong Kong	2	1	44	38	+6	6
Kenya	1	2	34	45	–11	3
Papua New Guinea	0	3	31	93	–62	0

8 March
TBD

Belgium	37–5	Papua New Guinea

Estadio Charrua, Montevideo

8 March
TBD

Kenya	0–12	Hong Kong

Estadio Charrua, Montevideo

8 March
TBD

Belgium	24–5	Hong Kong

Estadio Charrua, Montevideo

8 March
TBD

Kenya	29–12	Papua New Guinea

Estadio Charrua, Montevideo

9 March
TBD

Papua New Guinea	14–27	Hong Kong

Estadio Charrua, Montevideo

9 March
TBD

Kenya	5–21	Belgium

Estadio Charrua, Montevideo

=== Pool C ===
Team	W	L	PF	PA	PD	Pts
Argentina	3	0	85	12	+73	9
Uganda	2	1	68	33	+35	6
Thailand	1	2	50	25	+25	4
Mexico	0	3	7	140	–133	0

8 March
TBD

Uganda	15–5	Thailand

Estadio Charrua, Montevideo

8 March
TBD

Argentina	54–0	Mexico

Estadio Charrua, Montevideo

8 March
TBD

Uganda	48–7	Mexico

Estadio Charrua, Montevideo

8 March
TBD

Argentina	10–7	Thailand

Estadio Charrua, Montevideo

9 March
TBD

Thailand	38–0	Mexico

Estadio Charrua, Montevideo

9 March
TBD

Argentina	21–5	Uganda

Estadio Charrua, Montevideo

=== 9th to 12th playoffs ===
9th place semifinals
9 March – TBD – Estadio Charrua
Papua New Guinea	5
Paraguay	19
9 March – TBD – Estadio Charrua
Czech Republic	29
Mexico	0

9th place final
10 March – TBD – Estadio Charrua
Paraguay	10
Czech Republic	7
11th place final
10 March – TBD – Estadio Charrua
Papua New Guinea	12
Mexico	19

=== 5th to 8th playoffs ===
Fifth place

10 March
TBD

Poland	28-17	Thailand

Estadio Charrua, Montevideo

Seventh place

10 March
TBD

Hong Kong	27-22	Kenya

Estadio Charrua, Montevideo

=== Cup ===
Quarterfinals
9 March – TBD – Estadio Charrua
Hong Kong	17
Uganda	22
9 March – TBD – Estadio Charrua
China	24
Kenya	7
9 March – TBD – Estadio Charrua
Argentina	26
Poland	17
9 March – TBD – Estadio Charrua
Belgium	17
Thailand	5

Semifinals
10 March – TBD – Estadio Charrua
Uganda	10
China	26
10 March – TBD – Estadio Charrua
Argentina	35
Belgium	5

Final
10 March – TBD – Estadio Charrua
China	38
Argentina	7
3rd place final
10 March – TBD – Estadio Charrua
Uganda	12
Belgium	29

=== Final placings ===
Place	Team
1st place, gold medalist(s)	China
2nd place, silver medalist(s)	Argentina
3rd place, bronze medalist(s)	Belgium
4	Uganda
5	Poland
6	Thailand
7	Hong Kong
8	Kenya
9	Paraguay
10	Czech Republic
11	Mexico
12	Papua New Guinea

== Kraków ==
The third event of the series will take place at Stadion Miejski im. Henryka Reymana in Kraków, Poland.

=== Pool A ===
Team	W	L	PF	PA	PD	Pts
China	3	0	92	17	+75	9
Czech Republic	2	1	74	34	40	6
Thailand	1	2	48	72	-24	3
Hong Kong	0	3	12	103	-91	0

18 May
11:00

Thailand	33-12	Hong Kong

Stadion Miejski im. Henryka Reymana, Kraków

18 May
11:22

China	24-12	Czech Republic

Stadion Miejski im. Henryka Reymana, Kraków

18 May
13:42

Thailand	10-26	Czech Republic

Stadion Miejski im. Henryka Reymana, Kraków

18 May
14:04

China	34-0	Hong Kong

Stadion Miejski im. Henryka Reymana, Kraków

18 May
16:24

Hong Kong	0-36	Czech Republic

Stadion Miejski im. Henryka Reymana, Kraków

18 May
16:46

China	34-5	Thailand

Stadion Miejski im. Henryka Reymana, Kraków

=== Pool B ===
Team	W	L	PF	PA	PD	Pts
Argentina	3	0	85	32	+53	9
Paraguay	2	1	55	53	+2	6
Uganda	1	2	61	74	–13	4
Papua New Guinea	0	3	41	83	–42	1

18 May
11:44

Uganda	14–17	Paraguay

Stadion Miejski im. Henryka Reymana, Kraków

18 May
12:06

Argentina	25–5	Papua New Guinea

Stadion Miejski im. Henryka Reymana, Kraków

18 May
14:26

Uganda	27–26	Papua New Guinea

Stadion Miejski im. Henryka Reymana, Kraków

18 May
14:48

Argentina	29–7	Paraguay

Stadion Miejski im. Henryka Reymana, Kraków

18 May
17:08

Paraguay	31–10	Papua New Guinea

Stadion Miejski im. Henryka Reymana, Kraków

18 May
17:30

Argentina	31–20	Uganda

Stadion Miejski im. Henryka Reymana, Kraków

=== Pool C ===
Team	W	L	PF	PA	PD	Pts
Poland	2	1	98	40	+58	7
Belgium	2	1	79	24	+55	7
Kenya	2	1	50	48	+2	6
Mexico	0	3	7	122	–115	0

18 May
12:28

Poland	19–21	Kenya

Stadion Miejski im. Henryka Reymana, Kraków

18 May
12:50

Belgium	38–0	Mexico

Stadion Miejski im. Henryka Reymana, Kraków

18 May
15:10

Poland	55–0	Mexico

Stadion Miejski im. Henryka Reymana, Kraków

18 May
15:32

Belgium	22–0	Kenya

Stadion Miejski im. Henryka Reymana, Kraków

18 May
17:52

Kenya	29–7	Mexico

Stadion Miejski im. Henryka Reymana, Kraków

18 May
18:14

Belgium	19–24	Poland

Stadion Miejski im. Henryka Reymana, Kraków

=== 9th to 12th playoffs ===
9th place semifinals
19 May – 12:28 – Stadion Miejski
Papua New Guinea	33
Hong Kong	7
19 May – 12:50 – Stadion Miejski
Thailand	31
Mexico	0

9th place final
19 May – 15:32 – Stadion Miejski
Papua New Guinea	15
Thailand	19
11th place final
19 May – 15:10 – Stadion Miejski
Hong Kong	10
Mexico	7

=== 5th to 8th playoffs ===
Fifth place

19 May
16:16

Argentina	15–12	Czech Republic

Stadion Miejski im. Henryka Reymana, Kraków

Seventh place

19 May
15:54

Paraguay	5–35	Uganda

Stadion Miejski im. Henryka Reymana, Kraków

=== Cup ===
Quarterfinals
19 May – 11:00 – Stadion Miejski
Argentina	5
Kenya	22
19 May – 11:22 – Stadion Miejski
Poland	24
Czech Republic	5
19 May – 11:44 – Stadion Miejski
China	38
Uganda	14
19 May – 12:06 – Stadion Miejski
Paraguay	0
Belgium	38

Semifinals
19 May – 14:06 – Stadion Miejski
Kenya	15
Poland	21
19 May – 14:28 – Stadion Miejski
China	21
Belgium	12

Final
19 May – 17:23 – Stadion Miejski
China	36
Poland	0
3rd place final
19 May – 16:58 – Stadion Miejski
Kenya	7
Belgium	26

=== Final placings ===
Place	Team
1st place, gold medalist(s)	China
2nd place, silver medalist(s)	Poland
3rd place, bronze medalist(s)	Belgium
4	Kenya
5	Argentina
6	Czech Republic
7	Uganda
8	Paraguay
9	Thailand
10	Papua New Guinea
11	Hong Kong
12	Mexico
