= Finland women's national rugby sevens team =

Women's team representing Finland in international rugby sevens

Finland
- Nickname: Northern Storm
- Union: Suomen Rugbyliitto
- Head coach: Ric Hennessy
- Captain: Anna Soiluva
First colours	Second colours

Rugby World Cup Sevens
- Appearances: 0

The Finland women's national sevens team represents Finland in rugby sevens. They placed fourth at the 2019 and 2021 Rugby Europe Women's Sevens Trophy.

== Tournament History ==
Rugby Europe Women's Sevens
Year	Results
(Slovakia) 2013	1st place, gold medalist(s)
(Norway) 2014	6th
(Lithuania) 2015	2nd place, silver medalist(s)
(Russia) (France) 2016	9th
(Czech Republic) (Hungary) 2017	7th
(Ukraine) (Hungary) 2018	7th
(Hungary) (Portugal) 2019	4th
(Croatia) (Hungary) 2021	4th
(Croatia) (Hungary) 2022	9th

== Current squad ==
=== Players from the 202 Training Squad ===
Name	Club
Anna Soiluva	Tampere Rugby Club
Sanna Reinikainen	Helsinki Rugby Club
Heidi Hennessy	Helsinki Rugby Club
Hanna Visuri	Tampere Rugby Club
Jonna Ritala	Vaasa Rugby Club
Pilvi Pikivirtä	Oulu Rugby Club
Lilli Tikkanen	Warriors Rugby Club
Ida Herrgård	Warriors Rugby Club
Oona Tolppanen	Helsinki Rugby Club
Saana Järvenpää	Tampere Rugby Club
Eeva Pohjanheimo	Cheltenham Tigers WRFC
Kiira Kupiainen	Tampere Rugby Club
Essi Kara	Helsinki Rugby Club
Hanna Timonen	Saimaa Sharks RC
Venla Lehtonen	Saimaa Sharks RC
Mira Saarikoski	Helsinki Rugby Club
