= Scotland women's national rugby sevens team =

Scotland
- Union: Scottish Rugby Union
- Emblem: the Thistle
- Coach: (Scotland) Scott Wight
Team kit	Change kit

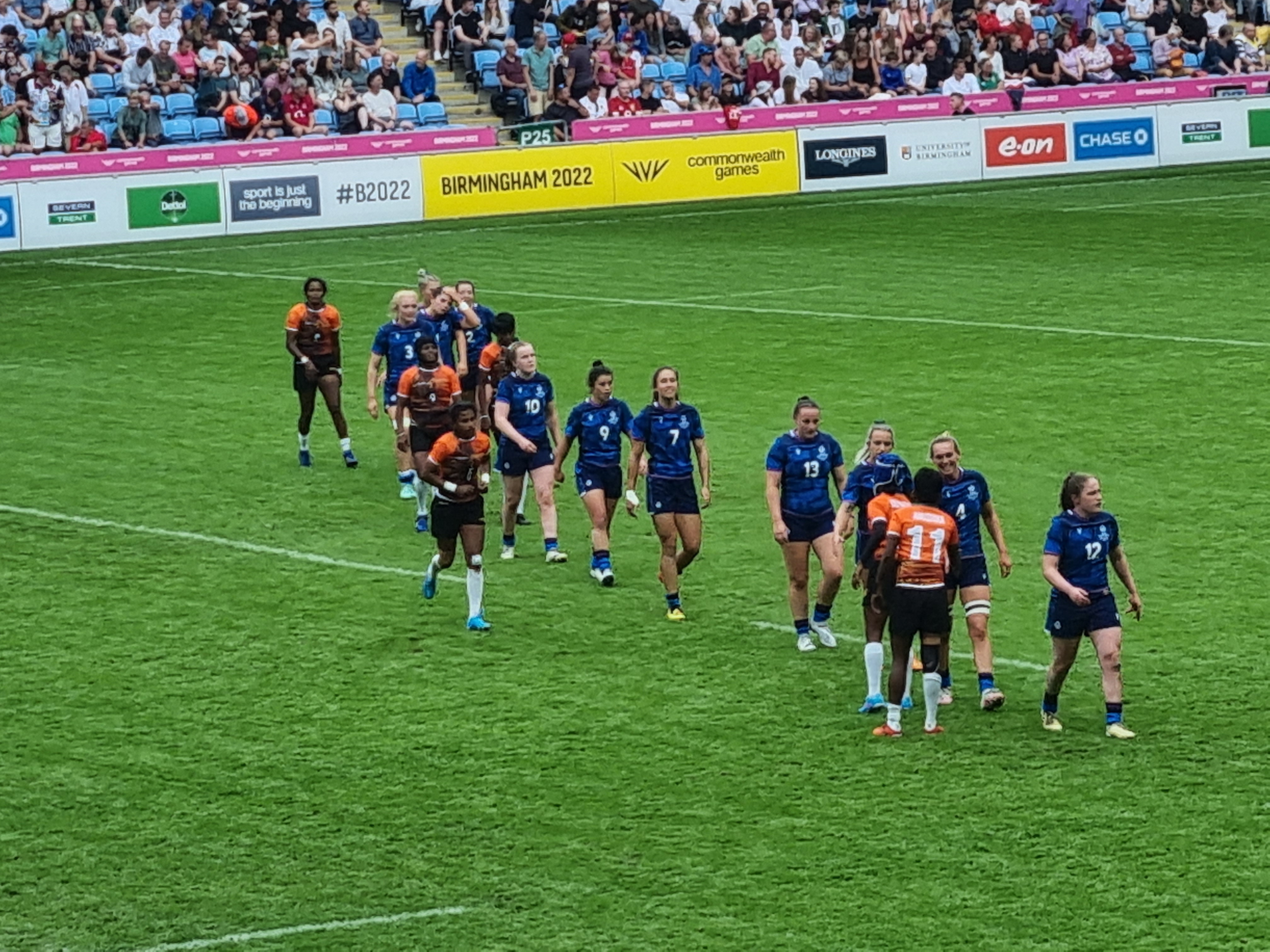
Scotland vs Sri Lanka at the 2022 Commonwealth Games.

The Scotland women's national sevens team is a minor rugby sevens team. They regularly compete at the Europe Women's Sevens.

== History ==
Scott Wight was appointed as head coach in 2017. Scotland competed at the 2013 Rugby World Cup Sevens Final Qualifier but did not qualify. Scotland were invited to the final leg of the 2018–19 World Rugby Women's Sevens Series in Biarritz, they placed eleventh in the tournament.

Scotland qualified for the 2022 Commonwealth Games and will be making their debut since the introduction of the women's competition at the 2018 Games.

== Players ==
=== Recent squad ===
Scotland's sevens squad to the 2022 Commonwealth Games.

- Head coach: Scott Forrest

No.	Player	Date of birth (age)
1	Rachel McLachlan	26 February 1999 (age 23)
2	Emma Orr	6 April 2003 (aged 19)
3	Megan Gaffney	3 December 1991 (age 30)
4	Eilidh Sinclair	6 July 1995 (age 27)
5	Evie Gallagher	22 August 2000 (age 21)
6	Lisa Thomson (co-c)	7 September 1997 (age 24)
7	Helen Nelson (co-c)	24 May 1994 (age 28)
8	Caity Mattinson	17 May 1996 (age 26)
9	Chloe Rollie	26 June 1995 (age 27)
10	Meryl Smith	11 June 2001 (age 21)
11	Shona Campbell	7 June 2001 (age 21)
12	Liz Musgrove	25 December 1996 (age 25)
13	Rhona Lloyd	17 October 1996 (age 25)

=== Previous squads ===
Squad to 2013 Rugby World Cup Sevens Final Qualifier

- Elizabeth Louise Dalgliesh
- Evy Therese Forsberg
- Ruth Slaven
- Laura Steven
- Megan Gaffney
- Lisa Martin
- Sarah Dixon
- Katy Green
- Annabel Sergeant
- Stephannie Johnston
- Lauren Harris
- Sarah Law

== Records ==
=== Commonwealth Games ===
Year	Round	Position	P	W	L	D
(Australia) 2018	Did Not Participate					
(England) 2022	Fifth place match	6th	5	2	3	0
Total	0 Titles	1/2	5	2	3	0

== See also ==
- Scotland national rugby sevens team
- Scotland women's national rugby union team
