= Romania women's national rugby sevens team =

Romania
- Union: Romanian Rugby Federation
- Nickname: Ghindele (The Acorns)
- Emblem: An oak leaf
- Coach: Neculai Tarcan
- Captain: Emilia Vizitiu
Team kit	Change kit

The Romania women national rugby sevens team has yet to compete in the World Rugby Sevens Series, Rugby World Cup Sevens and Summer Olympic Games. They are currently competing in the Rugby Europe Sevens Women's Championship Series.

== Tournament history ==
=== Summer Olympics ===
Olympic Games record
Year	Round	Position	Pld	W	L	D
(Brazil) 2016	Did not qualify					
Total	0 Titles	0/1	-	-	-	-

=== Rugby World Cup Sevens ===
World Cup record
Year	Round	Position	Pld	W	L	D
(United Arab Emirates) 2009	Did not qualify					
(Russia) 2013	Did not qualify					
(United States) 2018	Did not enter					
Total	0 Titles	2/7	10	2	8	0

== Recent Results ==
=== 2018 European Women`s Sevens Trophy ===
Dnipro

==== Pool C ====
Legend
Teams that advance to Cup Quarterfinals
Teams that advance to Challenge Trophy Semifinals

Team	Pld	W	D	L	PF	PA	PD	Pts
Romania	3	3	0	0	82	17	+65	9
Ukraine	3	2	0	1	89	29	+60	7
Latvia	3	0	1	2	31	81	–50	4
Israel	3	0	1	2	19	94	–75	4

23 June 2018
10:28

Romania	17–7	Latvia

23 June 2018
10:50

Ukraine	34–0	Latvia

23 June 2018
13:13

Romania	41–0	Israel

23 June 2018
13:35

Ukraine	45–5	Latvia

23 June 2018
15:58

Latvia	19–19	Israel

23 June 2018
16:20

Ukraine	10–24	Romania

Knockout stage

==== Cup ====
Quarter-finals
24 June 2018 – 9:00
Sweden	39
Norway	0
24 June 2018 – 10:06
Switzerland	0
Ukraine	39
24 June 2018 – 9:22
Netherlands	57
Finland	0
24 June 2018 – 9:44
Romania	31
Hungary	15

Semi-finals
24 June 2018 – 12:59
Sweden	12
Ukraine	17
24 June 2018 – 13:21
Netherlands	33
Romania	0

Final
24 June 2018 – 16:11
Ukraine	0
Netherlands	33
Third place
24 June 2018 – 15:46
Sweden	19
Romania	12

Szeged

==== Pool C ====
Legend
Teams that advance to Cup Quarterfinals
Teams that advance to Challenge Trophy Semifinals

Team	Pld	W	D	L	PF	PA	PD	Pts
Romania	3	3	0	0	48	20	+28	9
Sweden	3	2	0	1	77	12	+65	7
Czech Republic	3	1	0	2	41	62	–21	5
Austria	3	0	0	3	10	82	–72	3

7 July 2018
11:24

Sweden	27–0	Austria

7 July 2018
11:46

Romania	17–5	Czech Republic

7 July 2018
14:04

Sweden	40–0	Czech Republic

7 July 2018
14:26

Romania	19–5	Austria

7 July 2018
16:49

Sweden	10–12	Romania

7 July 2018
17:11

Czech Republic	36–5	Austria

Knockout stage

==== Cup ====
Quarter-finals
8 July 2018 – 10:00
Netherlands	57
Hungary	5
8 July 2018 – 11:06
Finland	5
Sweden	20
8 July 2018 – 10:22
Ukraine	31
Czech Republic	5
8 July 2018 – 10:44
Romania	36
Norway	0

Semi-finals
8 July 2018 – 13:59
Netherlands	24
Sweden	7
8 July 2018 – 14:21
Ukraine	50
Romania	5

Final
8 July 2018 – 17:11
Netherlands	19
Ukraine	12
Third place
8 July 2018 – 16:49
Sweden	19
Romania	7

==== Standings ====
Legend
Promoted to 2019 Grand Prix Series
Relegated to 2019 Rugby Europe Conference

Rank	Team	Dnipro	Szeged	Points
1st place, gold medalist(s)	Netherlands	20	20	40
2nd place, silver medalist(s)	Ukraine	18	18	36
3rd place, bronze medalist(s)	Sweden	16	16	32
4	Romania	14	14	28
5	Hungary	12	10	22
6	Czech Republic	4	12	16
7	Finland	6	8	14
8	Norway	8	6	14
9	Switzerland	10	4	14
10	Israel	2	3	5
11	Austria	3	2	5
12	Latvia	1	1	2

=== 2019 Rugby Europe Women's Sevens Trophy ===
Budapest

==== Pool C ====
Legend
Teams that advance to Cup Quarterfinals
Teams that advance to Challenge Trophy Semifinals

Team	Pld	W	D	L	PF	PA	PD	Pts
Sweden	3	3	0	0	101	10	+91	9
Norway	3	2	0	1	31	51	–20	7
Romania	3	1	0	2	56	41	+15	5
Israel	3	0	0	3	5	91	–86	3

8 June 2019
11:44

Sweden	50–0	Israel

8 June 2019
12:06

Romania	17–19	Norway

8 June 2019
14:29

Sweden	29–0	Norway

8 June 2019
14:51

Romania	29–0	Israel

8 June 2019
17:14

Sweden	22–10	Romania

8 June 2019
17:36

Norway	12–5	Israel

Knockout stage

==== Cup ====
Quarter-finals
9 June 2019 – 9:55
Germany	33
Turkey	0
9 June 2019 – 11:06
Finland	17
Norway	10
9 June 2019 – 10:22
Portugal	7
Romania	14
9 June 2019 – 10:44
Sweden	0
Czech Republic	5

Semi-finals
9 June 2019 – 13:57
Germany	25
Finland	5
9 June 2019 – 14:19
Romania	12
Czech Republic	7

Final
9 June 2019 – 17:06
Germany	20
Romania	7
Third place
9 June 2019 – 16:44
Finland	0
Czech Republic	25

Lisbon

==== Pool B ====
Legend
Teams that advance to Cup Quarterfinals
Teams that advance to Challenge Trophy Semifinals

Team	Pld	W	D	L	PF	PA	PD	Pts
Romania	3	3	0	0	63	17	+46	9
Sweden	3	2	0	1	75	20	+55	7
Turkey	3	1	0	2	20	80	–60	5
Switzerland	3	0	0	3	17	58	–41	3

22 June 2019
11:44

Romania	19–0	Switzerland

22 June 2019
12:06

Sweden	39–0	Turkey

22 June 2019
14:29

Romania	29–5	Turkey

22 June 2019
14:51

Sweden	24–5	Switzerland

22 June 2019
17:14

Romania	15–12	Sweden

22 June 2019
17:36

Turkey	15–12	Switzerland

Knockout stage

==== Cup ====
Quarter-finals
23 June 2019 – 10:00
Germany	22
Norway	0
23 June 2019 – 11:06
Sweden	7
Finland	14
23 June 2019 – 10:22
Romania	33
Georgia	0
23 June 2019 – 10:44
Czech Republic	7
Portugal	0

Semi-finals
23 June 2019 – 13:29
Germany	20
Finland	12
23 June 2019 – 13:51
Romania	19
Czech Republic	0

Final
23 June 2019 – 18:18
Germany	5
Romania	22
Third place
23 June 2019 – 17:53
Finland	14
Czech Republic	12

==== Standings ====
Legend
Promoted to 2020 Grand Prix Series
and advances to 2019 Olympic qualifying tournament
Relegated to 2020 Rugby Europe Conference

Rank	Team	Budapest	Lisbon	Points
1st place, gold medalist(s)	Germany	20	18	38
2nd place, silver medalist(s)	Romania	18	20	38
3rd place, bronze medalist(s)	Czech Republic	16	14	30
4	Finland	14	16	30
5	Sweden	12	10	22
6	Portugal	8	12	20
7	Norway	10	8	18
8	Georgia	3	6	9
9	Turkey	6	2	8
10	Hungary	4	4	8
11	Israel	1	3	4
12	Switzerland	2	1	3

=== 2019 Rugby Europe Women's Sevens Olympic Qualifying Tournament ===
Source:

=== Pool C ===
Legend
Teams that advance to Cup Quarterfinals
Teams that advance to Bowl Semifinals

Team	Pld	W	D	L	PF	PA	PD	Pts
Spain	3	3	0	0	89	12	+77	9
Ireland	3	2	0	1	103	19	+84	7
Romania	3	1	0	2	34	88	-54	5
Czech Republic	3	0	0	3	12	119	-107	3

13 July 2019
11:44

Spain	35–7	Czech Republic

Central Stadium, Kazan
Referee: Katherine Ritchie (England)

13 July 2019
12:06

Ireland	48–0	Romania

Central Stadium, Kazan
Referee: Hollie Davidson (Scotland)

13 July 2019
14:39

Spain	35–0	Romania

Central Stadium, Kazan
Referee: Sara Cox (England)

13 July 2019
14:51

Ireland	50–0	Czech Republic

Central Stadium, Kazan
Referee: Clara Munarini (Italy)

13 July 2019
17:14

Spain	19–5	Ireland

Central Stadium, Kazan
Referee: Sara Cox (England)

13 July 2019
17:36

Romania	34–5	Czech Republic

Central Stadium, Kazan
Referee: Joy Neville (Ireland)

Knockout stage

=== Cup ===
Quarter-finals
14 July – 10:00 – Central Stadium
France	55
Romania	0
14 July – 11:06 – Central Stadium
England	17
Ireland	7
14 July – 10:22 – Central Stadium
Russia	44
Italy	0
14 July – 10:44 – Central Stadium
Spain	17
Poland	14

Semi-finals
14 July – 13:59 – Central Stadium
France	12
England	14
14 July – 14:21 – Central Stadium
Russia	12
Spain	5

Final
14 July – 17:11 – Central Stadium
England	19
Russia	0
Third place
14 July – 16:46 – Central Stadium
France	17
Spain	5

=== Plate ===
Semi-finals
14 July – 13:15 – Central Stadium
Romania	0
Ireland	48
14 July – 13:37 – Central Stadium
Italy	5
Poland	12

Final
14 July – 16:24 – Central Stadium
Ireland	33
Poland	5
Seventh place
14 July – 16:02 – Central Stadium
Romania	14
Italy	29

== Players ==
=== Current squad ===
The following 12 players were called up for the 2021 Rugby Europe Women Sevens Championship Series on the 21st of June 2021.

Player	Club/province
Loredana Juncanariu	(Romania) Politehnica Iași
Ana-Maria Călin	(Romania) Politehnica Iași
Georgiana Gabor	(Romania) Politehnica Iași
Georgiana Vizitiu	(Romania) Agronomia București
Emilia Vizitiu (c)	(Romania) Agronomia București
Ana-Maria Sandu	(Romania) Politehnica Iași
Maria Atomi	(Romania) Politehnica Iași
Simona Roșca	(Romania) Politehnica Iași
Bianca Alexandra Preda	(Romania) Agronomia București
Carmen Ioana Cîrgea	(Romania) Universitatea Cluj
Marilena Leca	Unattached
Ștefania Ghebu	(Romania) Universitatea Cluj

== Coaches ==
=== Current coaching staff ===
The current coaching staff of the Romanian women national sevens team:

Name	Nationality	Role
Neculai Tarcan	ROU	Head coach
Alexandru Marin Jr.	ROU	Assistant coach
Adina Dreve	ROU	Strength & Conditioning coach
Dr. Ilie Vlad	ROU	Team doctor

== See also ==
- Rugby union in Romania
- Romania national rugby union team
- Romania national rugby sevens team
- Romania national under-20 rugby union team
