= Moldova women's national rugby sevens team =

Moldova
- Union: Moldovan Rugby Federation
- Coach: Elena Andronic
Team kit

The Moldova women's national rugby sevens team represents Moldova in women's rugby sevens. They won the FIRA–AER Women's Sevens - Division A in 2010. In 2019 they won the Rugby Europe Women's Sevens Conference and, were promoted to the Trophy division and qualified for the Europe Women's Sevens Olympic Qualifying Tournament in Russia.

Moldova finished last at the 2021 Rugby Europe Women's Sevens Trophy in Zagreb, Croatia.

== Players ==
=== Previous squads ===
Squad to European Women's Sevens Series: June 16–17, 2012 at Ameland, Netherlands

- Cristina Popescu
- Parascovia Chirita
- Irina Tintari
- Lilia Bunici
- Oxana Bunici
- Adriana Revenco
- Maria Ursu
- Elena Covali
- Anastasia Mosneagu
- Oxana Budean
- Mihaela Artic
- Marina Vladimirov
