= Sweden women's national rugby sevens team =

Sweden
- Union: Swedish Rugby Union
- Coach: Neil Johnson
Team kit

Sweden women's national sevens team represents Sweden in Rugby sevens. They competed at the 2019 Rugby Europe Women's Sevens Olympic Qualifying Tournament in Kazan, Russia. They finished ninth overall and did not qualify for Tokyo 2020. Sweden placed third at the 2021 Rugby Europe Women's Sevens Trophy in Zagreb, Croatia.

== Players ==
=== Previous squads ===
12 member Squad to European Women's Sevens Series: June 16–17, 2012 at Ameland, Netherlands

- Kerstin Lövendahl
- Sara Sundström
- Jessica Melin
- Erika Andersson
- Rebecka Kearney
- Ninni Geibat Johansson
- Amanda Sandsborg
- Elisabeth Ygge
- Jennifer Lindholm
- Emilia Kristiansson
- Hanna Engdahl
- Johanna Norberg
