= Norway women's national rugby union team =

Norway
- Union: Norges Rugbyforbund
- Head coach: Lee Irvine
First colours

World Rugby ranking
- Current: 50 (as of 2 March 2026)
- Highest: 42
- Lowest: 50 (2026)

First international
- Norway 0–75 Germany (Amsterdam, Netherlands 8 May 2003)

Biggest win
- Norway 62–0 Serbia (Tervuren, Belgium 15 April 2007)

Biggest defeat
- Netherlands 84–0 Norway (San Dona Di Piave, Italy 23 April 2006)

The Norway women's national rugby union team are a national sporting side of Norway, representing them at rugby union. The side first played in 2003.

== History ==
Norway made their international debut on 8 May 2003, their first test match was against Germany which they lost heavily with a score of 0–75.

They competed in every edition of the FIRA Women's Championship between 2003 and 2007. They last played in 2009 when they hosted Finland in Oslo in a test match.

On 5 October 2024, Latvia and Norway played in their first official Rugby Europe competition, the match took place in Ogre City Stadium in Latvia.

== Results summary ==
(Full internationals only)

Rugby: Norway internationals 2003-
Opponent	First game	Played	Won	Drawn	Lost	Percentage
Belgium	2006	1	0	0	1	0.00%
Bosnia & Herzegovina	2005	2	2	0	0	100.00%
Denmark	2003	2	2	0	0	100%
Finland	2007	2	0	1	1	25.00%
Germany	2003	3	0	0	3	0.00%
Netherlands	2004	2	0	0	2	0.00%
Russia	2005	3	0	0	3	0.00%
Serbia	2007	1	1	0	0	100.00%
Sweden	2003	1	0	0	1	0.00%
Summary	2003	17	5	1	11	29.41%

== See also ==
- Rugby union in Norway
