= Czech Republic women's national rugby sevens team =

Czech Republic
- Union: Czech Rugby Union
- Coach: Lionel Perrin
Team kit

World Cup Sevens
- Appearances: 0

The Czech Republic women's national rugby sevens team is a national sporting side that represents the Czech Republic in Rugby sevens.

Czechia took part in the 2023 Rugby Europe Women's Sevens Championship Series. They competed in the 2024 World Rugby Sevens Challenger Series in Dubai; they finished eighth overall in the first round. They finished eighth overall at the 2024 Sevens Challenger Series.

== Players ==
Czechia's squad to the 2024 World Rugby Sevens Challenger Series:

| No. | Players |
|---|---|
| 1 | Julie Doležilová |
| 2 | Pavlina Cuprova |
| 3 | Kristýna Plevová |
| 4 | Christine Tesařová |
| 6 | Sara Lea Exnerova |
| 7 | Anežka-Marta Sládková |
| 8 | Věra Gärtnerová |
| 9 | Lucie Roczyn |
| 12 | Stepanka Slukova |
| 19 | Tess Braunerova |
| 21 | Veronika Bolfová |
| 24 | Natalie Reitzova |
