= 2025–26 SVNS squads =

International rugby sevens

SVNS 2024–25 squads

This is a list of the complete squads for the 2025–26 SVNS.

Legend
Gold	Indicates the captains for a tournament
–	Indicates that a player did not play in the tournament

== Argentina ==
Men's Head Coach: (Argentina) Santiago Gómez Cora
Women's Head Coach: (Argentina) Facundo Salas

Argentina men's team members 2025–26
Player	Jersey number by tournament								
Player	Dubai	Cape Town	Singapore	Perth	Vancouver	New York	Hong Kong	Valladolid	Bordeaux
Juan Patricio Batac	15	15	15	15	15	15	15	15	15
Sebastian Dubuc	12	12	–	–	12	12	12	12	12
Luciano González	11	11	11	11	11	11	11	11	11
Santiago Mare	10	10	10	10	–	–	10	–	–
Marcos Moneta	13	13	13	13	13	13	13	13	13
Eliseo Morales	8	8	8	8	–	8	–	–	–
Joaquín Pellandini	14	–	14	–	–	–	14	14	–
Santiago Vera Feld	2	2	2	2	2	2	2	2	2
Santiago Álvarez	6	6	6	6	6	6	6	6	6
Martiniano Arrieta	5	5	5	5	5	5	5	5	5
Matteo Graziano	1	1	1	1	1	1	1	1	1
Valentin Maldonado Castro	20	20	–	20	20	–	–	–	–
Santino Zangara	3	3	3	3	3	3	3	3	3
Pedro De Haro	–	9	9	9	9	9	9	9	9
Gregorio Pérez Pardo	–	–	4	4	4	4	4	4	4
Lautaro Bazan Velez	–	–	–	–	7	7	–	7	–
Mateo Fossati	–	–	–	–	–	–	–	–	21
Timoteo Silva	–	–	–	–	–	–	–	–	23

Argentina women's team members 2025–26
Player	Jersey number by tournament		
Player	Hong Kong	Valladolid	Bordeaux
Virginia Brigido	9	9	9
Cande Delgado	8	8	8
Male Díaz	14	14	14
Cristal Escalante	12	12	12
Sofia Gonzalez	10	10	10
Francesca Iacaruso	22	22	22
Azul Medina	6	–	–
Josefina Padellaro	18	18	18
Pula Pedrozo	4	4	4
Antonella Reding	11	11	11
Talía Rodich	13	13	13
María Taladrid	3	3	3
Ruth Velázquez	15	15	–
Milagros Lecuona	–	23	23
Yamila Gonzalez	–	–	7

== Australia ==
Men's Head Coach: (New Zealand) Liam Barry
Women's Head Coach: (Australia) Tim Walsh

Australia men's team members 2025–26
Player	Jersey number by tournament								
Player	Dubai	Cape Town	Singapore	Perth	Vancouver	New York	Hong Kong	Valladolid	Bordeaux
William Cartwright	9	9	9	9	–	–	–	–	–
Wallace Charlie	77	77	77	77	77	77	77	77	77
Maurice Longbottom	11	–	–	–	11	11	11	11	11
Ethan McFarland	24	24	24	24	24	24	24	24	24
James McGregor	3	3	3	3	–	–	3	3	3
Dietrich Roache	4	4	4	–	4	4	4	4	–
Hadley Tonga	71	–	–	71	–	–	–	–	–
Josh Turner	7	7	7	7	7	7	7	7	7
Jayden Blake	13	13	13	13	13	13	–	–	13
Ben Dalton	10	10	10	10	10	10	10	10	10
Aden Ekanayake	23	23	23	23	23	23	23	23	23
Henry Hutchison	1	1	1	1	1	1	1	1	1
Harry Wilson	33	33	33	33	33	33	33	33	33
Ben Dowling	–	2	2	2	2	2	2	2	2
Beau Morrison	–	22	–	–	–	–	–	–	–
Cooper Watters	–	–	21	–	–	–	–	–	–
Jarrah McLeod	–	–	–	31	–	–	–	–	–
James Turner	–	–	–	–	14	14	14	14	14
Archie Saunders	–	–	–	–	49	49	49	49	49

Australia women's team members 2025–26
Player	Jersey number by tournament								
Player	Dubai	Cape Town	Singapore	Perth	Vancouver	New York	Hong Kong	Valladolid	Bordeaux
Madison Ashby	6	6	6	6	6	6	6	6	6
Mackenzie Davis	4	4	–	4	4	–	–	–	–
Heidi Dennis	13	13	13	13	13	13	13	13	13
Amahli Hala	2	2	–	2	2	2	2	–	2
Tia Hinds	9	–	9	9	9	9	9	9	–
Faith Nathan	3	3	3	3	3	3	3	3	3
Ruby Nicholas	23	23	23	–	–	–	–	–	–
Kaitlin Shave	8	–	8	8	–	8	8	8	8
Maddison Levi	12	12	12	12	12	12	12	12	12
Teagan Levi	5	5	5	5	–	5	5	5	5
Isabella Nasser	10	10	10	10	10	10	10	10	10
Sariah Paki	65	–	65	65	65	65	65	65	65
Bienne Terita	22	22	22	22	–	–	22	22	22
Kiiahla Duff	–	28	–	–	28	–	–	–	–
Bridget Clark	–	14	–	–	14	–	–	–	–
Kahli Henwood	–	15	–	15	15	15	15	15	15
Maya Stewart	–	–	21	–	–	–	–	–	–
Sidney Taylor	–	–	98	–	–	–	–	–	–
Demi Hayes	–	–	–	–	11	11	–	11	11
Alysia Lefau-Fakaosilea	–	–	–	–	–	55	55	55	55

== Brazil ==
Women's Head Coach: (New Zealand) Crystal Kaua

Brazil women's team members 2025–26
Player	Jersey number by tournament		
Player	Hong Kong	Valladolid	Bordeaux
Giovanna Barth	95	95	95
Thalia Costa	5	5	5
Leila dos Santos Silva	4	4	4
Marina Fioravanti	8	8	8
Aline Furtado	2	2	2
Gisele Gomes	7	7	7
Camila Carvalho	77	77	77
Isadora Lopes	6	6	6
Júlia Rodrigues	70	–	–
Bianca Silva	11	11	11
Yasmim Soares	22	22	22
Lohana Valente	20	–	–
Rafaela Zanellato	3	–	–
Gabriela Lima	–	9	9
Ariely Moreira	–	14	14
Mariely Moreira	–	18	–
Claudia Victoria Beltran	–	–	17

== Canada ==
Women's Head Coach: (Canada) Jocelyn Barrieau

Canada women's team members 2025–26
Player	Jersey number by tournament								
Player	Dubai	Cape Town	Singapore	Perth	Vancouver	New York	Hong Kong	Valladolid	Bordeaux
Monique Coffey	55	55	–	–	–	–	–	–	–
Asia Hogan-Rochester	24	24	–	–	–	–	–	24	24
Carmen Izyk	8	8	–	–	8	8	8	8	8
Carissa Norsten	19	19	19	19	19	–	–	–	–
Krissy Scurfield	13	13	13	13	–	–	–	–	–
Charity Williams	6	–	–	–	6	6	6	6	6
Larah Wright	47	47	–	–	47	47	47	–	–
Savannah Bauder	5	5	5	5	5	5	5	5	5
Pamphinette Buisa	99	99	–	–	–	–	–	–	99
Eden Kilgour	14	14	14	14	–	14	14	14	14
Breanne Nicholas	4	4	4	4	4	4	4	4	4
Adia Pye	21	21	–	–	–	–	–	21	21
Kennedi Stevenson	38	38	38	38	38	38	38	38	38
Ivy Poetker	–	68	–	–	–	–	–	–	–
Olivia Apps	–	–	9	9	–	–	9	9	–
Fancy Bermudez	–	–	10	10	–	–	10	–	10
Alysha Corrigan	–	–	16	16	–	–	16	16	–
Sabrina Poulin	–	–	22	22	–	–	22	–	–
Shoshanah Seumanutafa	–	–	25	25	25	25	–	–	–
Taylor Perry	–	–	40	40	–	–	–	40	40
Gabrielle Senft	–	–	88	88	–	–	–	–	–
Piper Logan	–	–	–	–	11	–	–	11	–
Keyara Wardley	–	–	–	–	12	–	–	–	–
Claire Gallagher	–	–	–	–	65	–	–	–	–
Chloe Daniels	–	–	–	–	77	–	–	–	77
Florence Symonds	–	–	–	–	7	7	7	7	7
Vanessa Chiappetta	–	–	–	–	–	3	–	–	–
Mahalia Robinson	–	–	–	–	–	29	–	–	–
Madison Donnelly	–	–	–	–	–	37	–	–	–
Brogan Mior	–	–	–	–	–	97	–	–	–
Caroline Crossley	–	–	–	–	–	–	35	–	–

== Fiji ==
Men's Head Coach: (Fiji) Osea Kolinisau
Women's Head Coach: (New Zealand) Richard Walker

Fiji men's team members 2025–26
Player	Jersey number by tournament								
Player	Dubai	Cape Town	Singapore	Perth	Vancouver	New York	Hong Kong	Valladolid	Bordeaux
George Bose	55	55	55	55	55	55	–	55	55
Pilipo Bukayaro	9	9	9	9	9	9	–	9	–
Manueli Maisamoa	11	11	11	11	11	11	11	11	–
Waisea Nacuqu	8	8	–	–	–	–	–	–	–
Apete Narogo	15	15	–	–	15	–	15	15	15
Sakiusa Siqila	92	92	–	–	–	–	–	92	92
Terio Veilawa	88	88	88	88	88	88	88	88	88
Jerry Matana	3	3	3	3	3	3	3	–	3
Sevuloni Mocenacagi	4	4	4	4	4	4	–	–	–
Vuiviawa Naduvalo	12	12	12	12	12	12	12	12	12
Joseva Talacolo	2	2	2	2	2	2	2	2	2
Rauto Vakadranu	28	28	–	–	–	–	–	–	–
Ilikimi Vunaki	6	6	–	–	–	–	–	–	–
Kavekini Tanivanuakula	–	–	1	1	1	1	1	1	1
Tira Wilagi Patterson	–	–	5	5	–	–	5	–	–
Iowane Teba	–	–	10	10	–	–	–	–	–
Nacani Boginisoko	–	–	13	13	13	13	13	13	–
Douglas Daveta	–	–	27	27	27	27	27	–	–
Akuila Dranivotua	–	–	–	–	60	60	60	60	60
Filipe Sauturaga	–	–	–	–	–	–	7	7	7
Tomasi Vuluma	–	–	–	–	–	–	30	30	30
Isia Rugu	–	–	–	–	–	–	–	–	76

Fiji women's team members 2025–26
Player	Jersey number by tournament								
Player	Dubai	Cape Town	Singapore	Perth	Vancouver	New York	Hong Kong	Valladolid	Bordeaux
Rogosau Adimereani	18	18	18	18	18	18	18	18	18
Lavena Cavuru	7	7	–	–	–	–	7	–	–
Kelerayani Luvu	28	28	28	–	28	28	–	–	–
Vika Nakacia	37	37	–	–	–	–	–	–	–
Atelaite Ralivanawa	42	42	–	–	42	–	42	42	42
Reapi Ulunisau	6	6	6	6	6	6	6	6	6
Sera Bolatini	34	34	34	34	34	34	34	34	34
Adi Vani Buleki	3	3	3	3	3	3	3	–	–
Verenaisi Ditavutu	20	20	20	20	20	20	20	20	20
Sesenieli Donu	4	4	4	4	4	4	4	4	4
Losana Kuruibua	43	43	–	–	43	43	–	–	–
Adita Milinia	40	40	–	–	–	–	–	–	–
Silika Qalo	35	35	35	35	–	–	35	35	35
Ana Maria Naimasi	–	–	8	8	–	8	–	8	8
Kolora Lomani	–	–	26	26	–	–	–	–	–
Mariana Talatoka	–	–	41	41	41	41	41	41	41
Alfreda Fisher	–	–	44	44	–	–	–	–	–
Adi Salote Nailolo	–	–	45	–	–	–	–	–	–
Ilisapeci Delaiwau	–	–	–	14	14	14	14	14	14
Mere Vocevoce	–	–	–	30	30	30	–	30	30
Varasika Tukana	–	–	–	–	–	–	46	–	–
Lusiana Tinai	–	–	–	–	–	–	47	47	47
Ivi Talei Savu	–	–	–	–	–	–	–	48	48

== France ==
Men's Head Coach: (France) Benoît Baby
Women's Head Coach: (France) Romain Huet

France men's team members 2025–26
Player	Jersey number by tournament								
Player	Dubai	Cape Town	Singapore	Perth	Vancouver	New York	Hong Kong	Valladolid	Bordeaux
Enahemo Artaud	48	48	48	48	–	–	48	48	48
Simon Désert	11	11	11	11	11	11	11	11	–
Merlin Leflamand	20	–	–	–	–	–	–	–	–
Luca Mignot	99	99	–	–	–	–	–	99	99
Stephen Parez	5	5	5	–	–	–	–	–	–
Celian Pouzelgues	31	–	–	–	31	31	–	31	31
Paulin Riva	6	6	6	–	6	6	6	6	6
Josselin Bouhier	28	28	28	28	28	28	28	28	28
Ali Dabo	75	75	75	75	–	75	75	75	75
Liam Delamare	76	76	76	76	76	76	76	76	76
Jordan Sepho	12	12	12	12	12	12	12	12	12
Andy Timo	88	88	88	88	–	–	–	–	–
Antoine Zeghdar	8	8	8	–	8	8	8	8	8
William Iraguha	–	91	–	–	–	–	–	–	–
Diego Miranda	–	58	–	–	–	–	58	–	–
Nelson Épée	–	–	7	7	7	7	7	–	–
Paul Leraitre	–	–	15	15	–	–	–	–	–
Enzo Benmegal	–	–	78	78	–	–	–	–	–
Hoani Bosmorin	–	–	–	17	–	–	–	–	17
Rayan Rebbadj	–	–	–	26	26	26	26	26	26
Clément Mondinat	–	–	–	29	29	–	–	–	–
Lucas Oudard	–	–	–	–	13	13	–	–	–
Yerim Fall	–	–	–	–	24	24	–	24	–
Maxim Granell	–	–	–	–	66	66	66	66	66
Grégoire Arfeuil	–	–	–	–	–	–	59	–	59

France women's team members 2025–26
Player	Jersey number by tournament								
Player	Dubai	Cape Town	Singapore	Perth	Vancouver	New York	Hong Kong	Valladolid	Bordeaux
Kelly Arbey	87	87	87	87	–	–	87	–	87
Alycia Chrystiaens	22	22	22	22	22	22	22	22	22
Faustine Piscicelli	49	–	49	49	–	–	–	–	49
Suliana Sivi	12	12	12	12	–	–	–	–	–
Mariama Tandiang	17	17	17	–	–	–	–	–	–
Hawa Tounkara	21	21	–	21	–	–	–	21	21
Lili Dezou	28	28	28	28	–	–	28	28	28
Lilou Graciet	6	6	6	6	6	6	6	6	–
Valentine Lothoz	7	7	–	–	7	7	–	–	–
Carla Neisen	9	9	–	–	9	9	–	9	9
Lou Noel	4	4	4	4	4	4	4	4	4
Aelig Tregouet	47	47	47	47	47	47	–	47	–
Léa Trollier	20	20	20	20	–	–	20	20	20
Cleo Hagel	–	26	26	26	26	26	26	26	26
Anaik Konyi	–	–	13	13	13	13	13	13	13
Marie Dupouy	–	–	27	27	27	27	27	–	–
Marie-Aurelie Castel	–	–	–	–	25	25	25	25	25
Hada Traore	–	–	–	–	30	–	–	30	–
Yolaine Yengo	–	–	–	–	62	62	62	–	–
Noa Coudre	–	–	–	–	73	73	–	–	–
Alice Grandhomme	–	–	–	–	–	59	–	–	–
Anne-Cécile Ciofani	–	–	–	–	–	–	2	–	–
Chloé Jacquet	–	–	–	–	–	–	10	10	10
Garance Merle	–	–	–	–	–	–	–	–	31

== Germany ==
Men's Head Coach: (Spain) Pablo Feijoo

Germany men's team members 2025–26
Player	Jersey number by tournament		
Player	Hong Kong	Valladolid	Bordeaux
Makonnen Amekuedi	60	60	60
Cedric Eichholz	54	54	54
Ben Ellermann	8	8	8
Anton Gleitze	10	10	10
Philip Gleitze	11	11	11
Max Heid	5	5	5
Felix Hufnagel	1	1	1
Niklas Koch	4	4	–
Jan Lammers	33	33	–
Bela Sindermann	34	–	–
Henry Smeed	23	23	–
Chris Umeh	7	7	7
Bennet Veil	68	68	68
Max Roddick	–	9	9
Michael Goedeke	–	–	25
Wolfram Hacker	–	–	17
Lennox Wiese	–	–	20

== Great Britain ==
Men's Head Coach: (Scotland) Ciaran Beattie
Women's Head Coach: (Wales) Jonathan Hooper

Great Britain men's team members 2025–26
Player	Jersey number by tournament								
Player	Dubai	Cape Town	Singapore	Perth	Vancouver	New York	Hong Kong	Valladolid	Bordeaux
Ryan Apps	14	14	–	–	14	14	14	14	14
Luca Bardelli	25	25	25	–	–	–	–	–	–
Tom Burton	15	15	15	15	15	15	15	15	–
Matt Davidson	6	6	6	6	6	6	6	6	6
Roan Frostwick	4	4	4	4	4	4	4	4	4
Brent Jackson	10	10	10	10	–	–	–	–	10
Rory McHaffie	9	9	–	–	–	–	9	–	–
Oliver Duncan	20	20	–	–	–	–	–	–	–
Damien Hoyland	7	7	–	–	–	–	–	–	–
Charlton Kerr	24	24	24	24	24	24	24	24	24
Marcus Kershaw	5	5	5	5	5	5	5	5	5
Joshua Radcliffe	23	23	23	23	23	23	–	23	–
Ethan Waddleton	11	11	–	–	11	11	11	11	11
Fin Callaghan	–	–	3	3	3	3	–	–	3
Finley Lloyd-Gilmour	–	–	13	13	13	13	13	13	13
Callum Woolley	–	–	21	21	–	–	–	–	–
Sunni Jardine	–	–	44	44	44	44	44	44	–
Ross McKnight	–	–	1	1	–	–	–	–	–
Ollie Dawkins	–	–	–	22	–	–	–	–	–
Jacob Henry	–	–	–	–	8	8	8	8	8
Ben Salmon	–	–	–	–	12	12	12	12	12
Ross McCann	–	–	–	–	–	–	2	–	–
Kaleem Barreto	–	–	–	–	–	–	–	22	22
Darcy Graham	–	–	–	–	–	–	–	–	26

Great Britain women's team members 2025–26
Player	Jersey number by tournament								
Player	Dubai	Cape Town	Singapore	Perth	Vancouver	New York	Hong Kong	Valladolid	Bordeaux
Ashton Adcock	21	21	–	–	–	–	–	–	–
Joia Bennett	55	55	55	55	–	–	–	–	–
Courtney Greenway	15	15	15	15	–	–	–	15	15
Hanna Marshall	9	9	–	–	–	–	–	–	–
Solana Shaw de Leon	28	28	–	–	–	–	–	28	28
Katie Shillaker	10	10	10	10	10	10	10	10	10
Eva Wood	12	12	–	–	–	–	–	–	–
Jorja Aiono	44	–	–	–	–	–	–	–	–
Nia Fajeyisan	13	13	–	–	–	–	–	–	–
Eloise Hayward	77	77	77	77	–	–	–	–	–
Abigail Pritchard	11	11	11	11	11	11	–	–	–
Ellen Scantlebury	67	67	–	–	67	67	67	67	67
Hollie Williamson	14	14	–	–	–	–	–	–	–
Millie Hyett	–	–	1	1	–	–	–	–	–
Jennie Hesketh	–	–	3	3	–	–	–	–	–
Evelyn Clarke	–	–	6	6	6	6	–	6	6
Molly Luthayi	–	–	8	8	–	–	–	–	–
Chantelle Miell	–	–	17	17	17	17	–	17	17
Joanne Vosakiwaiwai	–	–	19	19	–	–	–	–	–
Georgie Lingham	–	–	27	27	27	27	27	27	27
Joy Okechukwu	–	–	97	97	–	–	–	–	–
Abbie Brown	–	–	–	–	2	2	2	2	2
Grace Crompton	–	–	–	–	4	4	4	4	4
Saran Jones	–	–	–	–	20	20	–	–	–
Holly Thorpe	–	–	–	–	22	22	–	–	–
Heather Cowell	–	–	–	–	23	23	23	23	23
Gabby Healan	–	–	–	–	47	47	–	–	–
Amy Williams	–	–	–	–	64	64	–	–	–
Freya Aucken	–	–	–	–	–	–	24	–	–
Reneeqa Bonner	–	–	–	–	–	–	48	–	–
Ella Lovibond	–	–	–	–	–	–	25	–	–
Alicia Maude	–	–	–	–	–	–	60	–	–
Lauren Torley	–	–	–	–	–	–	36	–	–
Ellie Boatman	–	–	–	–	–	–	57	57	57
Vicky Laflin	–	–	–	–	–	–	42	–	–
Hannah Bluck	–	–	–	–	–	–	–	33	33
Hanna Tudor	–	–	–	–	–	–	–	26	26

== Japan ==
Women's Head Coach: (Japan) Yuka Kanematsu

Japan women's team members 2025–26
Player	Jersey number by tournament								
Player	Dubai	Cape Town	Singapore	Perth	Vancouver	New York	Hong Kong	Valladolid	Bordeaux
Yume Hirano	11	11	11	11	–	–	11	11	11
Hana Nagata	6	6	6	–	6	6	6	6	–
Michiyo Suda	14	14	14	14	14	14	14	14	14
Honoka Tsutsumi	2	2	–	–	2	2	2	2	2
Sakurako Yazaki	16	16	–	–	–	–	16	–	16
Harura Yamada	20	–	–	–	–	–	–	–	–
Marin Kajiki	3	3	3	3	3	–	3	3	3
Himawari Matsuda	9	9	9	9	9	9	9	–	–
Sakura Mizutani	15	15	–	–	–	–	–	–	–
Mei Ohtani	5	5	5	5	5	5	5	5	5
Natsuki Ouchida	13	13	13	13	–	13	13	13	13
Chiaki Saegusa	1	–	–	1	1	1	1	1	1
Hanako Utsumi	4	–	4	4	4	4	4	4	4
Mayu Yoshino	–	7	–	7	7	7	–	7	7
Wakana Akita	–	8	8	–	–	–	8	8	–
Ayane Hasebe	–	18	–	–	–	–	–	–	–
Minako Taniyama	–	–	10	10	10	–	–	10	10
Haruna Konishi	–	–	17	17	17	17	–	–	–
Hazuki Ouchida	–	–	19	19	19	19	19	19	19
Ria Anoku	–	–	21	21	–	21	–	–	–
Shiori Okyudo	–	–	–	–	22	22	–	–	22

== Kenya ==
Men's Head Coach: (Kenya) Kevin Wambua

Kenya men's team members 2025–26
Player	Jersey number by tournament		
Player	Hong Kong	Valladolid	Bordeaux
Nygel Amaitsa	10	10	–
Samuel Asati	9	9	9
David Nyagige	26	26	26
Patrick Odongo	11	11	11
Festus Shiasi	5	5	5
Brian Tanga	21	21	21
Floyd Wabwire	25	–	–
Denis Abukuse	13	13	13
George Ooro	3	3	3
Gabriel Ayimba	55	–	–
Kevin Wekesa	6	6	6
John Okoth	22	22	22
Vincent Onyala	4	4	4
Victor Odhiambo	–	14	14
Chrisant Ojwang	–	12	12
Jackson Siketi	–	–	15

== New Zealand ==
Men's Head Coach: (Fiji) Tomasi Cama
Women's Head Coach: (New Zealand) Cory Sweeney

New Zealand men's team members 2025–26
Player	Jersey number by tournament								
Player	Dubai	Cape Town	Singapore	Perth	Vancouver	New York	Hong Kong	Valladolid	Bordeaux
Kele Lasaqa	41	41	41	41	41	41	41	41	41
Sofai Maka	81	81	81	81	–	–	–	–	–
Akuila Rokolisoa	4	4	4	4	4	4	4	4	4
Brady Rush	2	2	2	2	2	2	2	2	2
Frank Vaenuku	75	75	75	75	75	–	–	–	–
Scott Gregory	1	1	1	1	–	–	–	1	1
Riley Williams	89	89	89	89	–	89	89	89	89
Dylan Collier	5	5	–	–	5	5	5	–	–
Sione Molia	18	–	–	–	18	18	–	18	18
Fletcher Morgan	97	97	97	97	–	97	97	97	97
Tone Ng Shiu	3	3	3	3	3	–	3	–	–
Rob Rush	22	–	22	22	22	22	22	–	22
Sam Clarke	–	23	–	–	23	23	23	–	–
Bradley Tocker	–	42	–	–	–	42	42	42	–
Kitiona Vai	–	–	7	7	7	7	–	7	7
Michael Manson	–	–	11	11	–	11	11	–	–
Regan Ware	–	–	64	64	64	–	–	64	64
Joey Taumateine	–	–	–	–	13	13	–	–	–
Roderick Solo	–	–	–	–	44	–	44	44	44
King Maxwell	–	–	–	–	–	–	12	–	–
Jayden Keelan	–	–	–	–	–	–	–	15	15
Ngarohi McGarvey-Black	–	–	–	–	–	–	–	6	6

New Zealand women's team members 2025–26
Player	Jersey number by tournament								
Player	Dubai	Cape Town	Singapore	Perth	Vancouver	New York	Hong Kong	Valladolid	Bordeaux
Maia Davis	11	11	11	11	–	11	11	11	11
Jazmin Felix-Hotham	13	13	13	13	13	–	–	13	13
Mahina Paul	4	4	4	4	4	4	4	4	4
Risi Pouri-Lane	7	7	7	7	7	7	7	7	7
Theresa Setefano	10	10	–	–	–	–	–	–	–
Braxton Sorensen-McGee	15	15	15	15	15	–	15	–	–
Katelyn Vaha'akolo	95	95	95	95	95	95	95	95	95
Danii Mafoe	17	17	17	17	17	17	–	17	17
Jorja Miller	2	2	2	2	2	2	2	2	2
Alena Saili	12	12	12	12	12	12	12	12	12
Kelsey Teneti	88	88	88	88	88	88	88	88	88
Stacey Waaka	3	3	3	3	3	3	3	3	3
Olive Watherston	82	82	82	82	82	82	82	82	–
Jaymie Kolose	–	–	23	23	23	23	23	23	23
Manaia Nuku	–	–	–	–	1	1	1	1	1
Justine McGregor	–	–	–	–	–	–	–	–	44

== South Africa ==
Men's Head Coach: (South Africa) Philip Snyman
Women's Head Coach: (South Africa) Cecil Afrika

South Africa men's team members 2025–26
Player	Jersey number by tournament								
Player	Dubai	Cape Town	Singapore	Perth	Vancouver	New York	Hong Kong	Valladolid	Bordeaux
Ronald Brown	7	7	–	–	7	7	7	–	–
Selvyn Davids	8	8	–	–	8	8	8	8	8
Donavan Don	15	15	15	15	–	15	15	–	15
Ricardo Duarttee	5	5	5	5	–	–	–	5	5
Tristan Leyds	24	24	24	24	24	24	24	24	24
Mfundo Ndhlovu	13	–	–	–	–	–	–	–	–
Shilton van Wyk	12	12	12	12	12	–	12	12	12
David Brits	19	19	19	19	19	19	19	–	19
Zain Davids	4	4	4	4	–	–	4	4	4
Christie Grobbelaar	1	1	1	1	1	–	–	–	–
Ryan Oosthuizen	2	2	2	2	2	2	2	2	2
Zander Reynders	21	21	21	21	–	–	–	–	–
Impi Visser	3	3	–	–	3	3	3	3	3
Nabo Sokoyi	–	9	9	–	–	–	–	–	–
Siviwe Soyizwapi	–	–	11	11	11	11	11	11	11
Sebastiaan Jobb	–	–	16	16	16	16	16	16	16
Luan Giliomee	–	–	27	27	–	–	–	–	–
Renaldo Young	–	–	–	20	–	–	–	–	–
Gino Cupido	–	–	–	–	35	35	–	35	–
Grant de Jager	–	–	–	–	28	28	–	–	–
Dewald Human	–	–	–	–	10	10	–	10	–
Jayden Nell	–	–	–	–	–	31	31	31	31
Quewin Nortje	–	–	–	–	–	–	14	14	14

South Africa women's team members 2025–26
Player	Jersey number by tournament		
Player	Hong Kong	Valladolid	Bordeaux
Shanidine Bezuidenhout	19	–	–
Byrhandré Dolf	10	10	10
Catha Jacobs	20	20	20
Shiniqwa Lamprecht	16	16	16
Lerato Makua	26	26	26
Ayanda Malinga	23	23	23
Owami Mohuli	22	22	22
Zintle Mpupha	4	4	4
Jané Mulder	21	21	21
Asisipho Plaatjies	2	–	–
Maceala Samboya	27	27	27
Maria Tshiremba	7	7	7
Eloise Webb	30	30	30
Vianca Boer	–	15	15
Patience Mokone	–	3	3

== Spain ==
Men's Head Coach: (Spain) Francisco Hernandez
Women's Head Coach: (Spain) María Ribera

Spain men's team members 2025–26
Player	Jersey number by tournament								
Player	Dubai	Cape Town	Singapore	Perth	Vancouver	New York	Hong Kong	Valladolid	Bordeaux
Francisco Cosculluela	5	–	5	5	–	–	5	5	5
Anton Legorburu	24	24	24	24	24	24	24	24	24
Eduardo Lopez	12	12	12	12	12	12	12	–	–
Jaime Manteca	14	14	14	14	14	14	14	14	14
Pol Pla	7	–	–	–	7	7	7	7	7
Roberto Ponce	8	8	8	8	8	8	8	–	–
Juan Ramos	4	4	4	4	–	–	4	4	4
Gabriel Rocaries	22	22	22	22	–	22	–	–	22
Enrique Bolinches	13	13	13	13	–	–	13	13	13
Manu Moreno	10	10	–	–	10	10	10	10	10
Tobias Sainz-Trapaga	1	1	–	–	1	–	1	–	–
Josep Serres	2	2	2	2	2	2	2	2	2
Jeremy Trevithick	6	6	6	6	6	–	6	6	–
Noah Canepa	–	15	15	15	–	–	–	–	–
Angel Bozal	–	3	3	3	3	–	–	3	3
Martin Sorreluz	–	–	20	20	20	20	–	–	–
Tiago Romero	–	–	–	–	11	11	–	–	11
Juan Martinez	–	–	–	–	18	18	–	18	–
Javier Lopez de Haro	–	–	–	–	–	21	–	–	–
Asier Perez	–	–	–	–	–	23	23	–	–
Telmo Fisher Obieta	–	–	–	–	–	–	–	73	–
Beltran Ortega	–	–	–	–	–	–	–	9	9
Nicolas Nieto	–	–	–	–	–	–	–	–	33

Spain women's team members 2025–26
Player	Jersey number by tournament		
Player	Hong Kong	Valladolid	Bordeaux
Carlota Caicoya	4	–	–
Abril Camacho	13	13	13
Marta Cantabrana	14	14	14
Olivia Fresneda	8	8	–
Marta Fresno	1	1	1
Denisse Gortazar	17	17	17
Arancha Leotte	16	16	16
Carmen Miranda Miralles	11	11	11
Silvia Morales	22	22	22
Paula Requena	7	–	7
Martina Serrano	9	9	9
Juana Stella	23	23	–
Amets Ulibarri	21	–	–
Jimena Blanco-Hortiguera Pedrero	–	15	15
Maria Calvo	–	12	12
Maria Garcia	–	6	6
Ana Cortés Ekobo	–	–	37

== United States ==
Men's Head Coach: (United States) Zack Test
Women's Head Coach: (United States) Emilie Bydwell

United States men's team members 2025–26
Player	Jersey number by tournament		
Player	Hong Kong	Valladolid	Bordeaux
Orrin Bizer	3	3	3
Ben Broselle	2	2	2
Will Chevalier	5	5	5
Aaron Cummings	1	1	1
Lucas Lacamp	12	12	12
Uluamu Niutupuivaha	16	–	–
Ryan Santos	8	8	8
Tucker Trickey	28	28	28
Stephen Tomasin	9	9	9
Marcus Tupuola	27	27	27
Pita Vi	25	–	–
Tiave Watts	34	–	–
Jack Wendling	13	13	13
Adam Channel	–	4	4
Rand Santos	–	99	99
David Still	–	6	6

United States women's team members 2025–26
Player	Jersey number by tournament								
Player	Dubai	Cape Town	Singapore	Perth	Vancouver	New York	Hong Kong	Valladolid	Bordeaux
Ashley Cowdrey	26	26	26	26	26	26	26	–	–
Erica Coulibaly	2	2	2	2	2	2	–	2	2
Sariah Ibarra	28	28	28	–	28	28	28	28	28
Ariana Ramsey	1	1	1	1	1	1	1	1	1
Alex Sedrick	8	8	8	–	–	–	8	8	8
Kaylen Thomas	19	19	19	19	19	19	19	19	19
Tahna Wilfley	3	3	3	3	3	3	3	3	3
Su Adegoke	24	24	24	24	24	24	–	24	24
Autumn Czaplicki	99	99	99	99	99	99	99	99	99
Kristi Kirshe	12	12	12	12	12	12	12	12	12
Sarah Levy	13	13	–	–	13	13	13	–	–
Florinalaulaau Liufau	33	33	–	–	–	–	33	–	–
Rachel Strasdas	15	15	15	15	15	15	15	15	15
Vasiti Turagavou	–	–	5	5	–	–	–	–	–
Sammy Sullivan	–	–	22	22	22	22	22	22	22
Cassidy Bargell	–	–	–	9	–	–	–	–	–
Tessa Hann	–	–	–	30	–	–	–	–	–
Hann Humphreys	–	–	–	–	29	29	–	–	–
Karina Gauto	–	–	–	–	–	–	10	–	–
Kayla Canett	–	–	–	–	–	–	–	7	7
Sereana Vulaono	–	–	–	–	–	–	–	14	14

== Uruguay ==
Men's Head Coach: (Uruguay) Gabriel Puig

Uruguay men's team members 2025–26
Player	Jersey number by tournament		
Player	Hong Kong	Valladolid	Bordeaux
Alfonso Chahnazaroff	22	22	22
Pedro Hoblog	45	45	–
Francisco Landauer	15	15	15
Manuel Parodi	8	–	–
Bruno Primavesi	19	–	19
Ignacio Rodriguez	23	23	23
Juan Manuel Tafernaberry	9	9	9
Diego Ardao	6	6	6
Tomás Etcheverry	3	3	3
Joaquin Fresnedo	2	2	2
Ivan Peters	12	12	–
Joaquin Suarez	71	–	71
Alfonso Vidal	1	1	1
Ignacio Alvarez	–	13	13
Baltazar Amaya	–	10	–
Ignacio Facciolo	–	80	80
Juan Gonzalez	–	–	4
