= Manaia Nuku =

- Born: 3 September 2002 (age 24) Hamilton, New Zealand
- Height: 1.69 m (5 ft 7 in)
- Weight: 68 kg (150 lb)

Rugby union career
Provincial / State sides
Years	Team	Apps	(Points)
2020	Waikato	2	(5)
2021	Bay of Plenty	3	(5)
National sevens team
Years	Team		Comps
2021-	New Zealand		76 apps
Medal record
Representing New Zealand
Women's rugby sevens
Olympic Games
Gold medal – first place	2024 Paris	Team competition

Manaia Nuku (born 3 September 2002) is a New Zealand rugby sevens player. She won a gold medal at the 2024 Summer Olympics as a member of the Black Ferns sevens team.

== Early life ==
Manaia Nuku was born on 3 September 2002 to Gina and Wallace Nuku. Her mother was a schoolteacher and her father a linesman. Her sister Te Whetumarama Nuku played rugby league for the New Zealand Warriors in the WNRL.

Nuku attended Hamilton Girls' High School which has produced New Zealand Sevens players Jazmin Felix-Hotham, Shiray Kaka, Terina Te Tamaki, and Tenika Willison.

== Rugby career ==
She made her debut for Waikato in the Farah Palmer Cup in 2020.

After making an impression at the 2020 Ignite7 tournament in 2020 she was given a full-time rugby sevens contract with the Black Ferns Sevens in 2021.

She was a non-travelling reserve for the 2020 Tokyo Olympics.

Nuku played for the Black Ferns Pango team at the 2022 Oceania Sevens at Pukekohe. She was named as a non-travelling reserve for the Black Ferns Sevens squad for the 2022 Commonwealth Games in Birmingham.

She was a non-travelling reserve for the 2022 Commonwealth Games in Birmingham.

She was a travelling reserve for the 2022 World Cup held in Cape Town in September 2022.

=== 2023 Premier Rugby Sevens ===
Nuku expanded her international playing career in 2023 when in May of that year she announced that she was going to play in the United States of America for Premier Rugby Sevens. Nuku signed with the New York Locals, playing alongside Black Ferns teammates Stacey Waaka and Tenika Willison.

Nuku fit in with the Locals right off the bat, totaling 14 points, two tries, 4 ball carries, and three tackles in the first tournament of the season. Nuku aided the team to a 1-1 finish at the Eastern Conference Kickoff at Q2 Stadium in Austin, Tx., topping the Texas Team, 31-17 and then falling to the Southern Headliners, 21-12 in the tournament final.

The Locals and Nuku found similar results in the Eastern Conference Finals at Highmark Stadium in Pittsburgh, Pa. ending 1-1. The Locals defeated the Pittsburgh Steeltoes, 22-14 to then fall to the Headliners once again in the final. At the Eastern Conference Finals, Nuku tallied two tries, 12 points, three carries, six tackles, and one steal.

New York advanced to the Premier Rugby Sevens Championship at Audi Field in Washington, D.C. where Nuku and the Locals finally got revenge over the Headliners. The Locals defeated the Headliners 17-14, advancing to the Championship match. The Locals ended the season taking second place after falling, 21-10 to the Northern Loonies in the title game. At the Championship Tournament, Nuku ended with one try, seven points, four carries, eight tackles, and one steal.

Nuku ended her first PR7s season with 33 points, five tries, 17 tackles, 11 carries, and two steals. At the end of the year, Nuku was named the 2023 Premier Rugby Sevens Defensive Player of the Year.

=== 2024 Olympics ===
On 20 June 2024 it was announced that she had been selected as a member of the New Zealand Women’s Rugby Sevens team for the Paris Olympics. The team won the gold medal, defeating Canada 19-12 in the final.

In October 2024 New Zealand Rugby announced that Nuku was among the 17 players that were contacted for 2025.

=== ACL Injury ===
On 30 March 2025 she ruptured an anterior cruciate ligament (ACL) in the final against Australia at the 2025 Hong Kong tournament on after landing awkwardly and had to be carried from the field. After the game she was piggybacked by a fellow team member to the medal presentation and to the haka in which she joined in teammates. The injury ruled her out from playing for the rest of the season.

Nuku’s managed return from injury saw her travelling as a non-playing member with the team to the 2026 Singapore and Perth tournaments.

In late February 2026 she re-signed with New Zealand Rugby through to the Olympics in 2028.

She was a member of the official travelling squad for the Vancouver and New York tournament but it wasn't until the latter event held on 14–15 March 2026 that after 349 days on the injury list she played again the New Zealand team a try in her first game, a 46-5 pool-play win against Great Britain. It was her 17th HSBC SVNS tournament appearance.

She normally plays at fullback as well as kicking both restarts and conversions.
