= Sebastiaan Jobb =

South African rugby player (born 1999)

- Born: 20 May 1999 (age 27) Northern Cape, South Africa
- Height: 1.82 m (6 ft 0 in)
- Weight: 78 kg (172 lb)

Rugby union career
International career
Years	Team	Apps	(Points)
2023–	South Africa Sevens		

Sebastiaan Jobb (born 20 May 1999) is a South African rugby union footballer, who plays for the South Africa national rugby sevens team.

== Career ==
Born in Northern Cape, Jobb played age-group rugby for the Vodacom Bulls Junior Springboks before making his debut for the South Africa national rugby sevens team at the 2023 Hong Kong Sevens, also playing the following week at the 2023 Singapore Sevens, although he suffered injuries which ruled him out for close to two years, returning to the squad in Vancouver, Canada, in February 2025 for the 2024-25 SVNS. However, while playing at the 2025 Canada Sevens, a red card in the semi-final meant he missed the final. That year, he played for SA Sevens A-side at the Rugby Africa Sevens in Mauritius.

Playing in the 2025-26 SVNS, Jobb was praised for his performances as South Africa won the 2026 Australia Sevens in Perth in February 2026, finishing the tournament as South Africa's leading try-scorer with his tally including two against Australia in the semi-final, and one in the 21-19 final victory over Fiji. The following month, Jobb scored two tries against New Zealand in New York at the 2026 USA Sevens, with South Africa again winning the title. Jobb was also a try-scorer in a semi-final against New Zealand in a win at the 2026 Hong Kong Sevens and in the final of the 2026 Spain Sevens. Jobb scored two against Fiji as South Africa were crowned the 2026 HSBC SVNS World Championship winners in the quarter finals in Bordeaux as they moved to an unassailable lead at the top of the overall standings.
