= Douglas Daveta =

Fiji rugby sevens player

Rugby union career
- Position(s): Fly-half, Full-back
Senior career
Years	Team	Apps	(Points)
- RFMF
- Malolo
National sevens team
Years	Team		Comps
2026-	Fiji 7s		

Douglas Daveta is a Fijian rugby union player. He plays for the Fiji national rugby sevens team.

== Career ==
A serving member of the Republic of Fiji Military Forces, in November 2025, Daveta played for the Republic of Fiji Military Forces (RFMF) at No.10 as they reached the final of the Vodafone Ratu Sukuna Bowl, but lost 10–26 to three-times defending champions Police at Labasa's Subrail Park. He also played in 2025 as Malolo won the Skipper Cup with a win over Naitasiri. He can also play at full-back.

Having played for the Fiji Warriors, Daveta made his debut for the Senior Fiji national rugby sevens team playing and impressing in the 2025-26 SVNS. He was part of the winning Fiji side's victory on debut at the 2026 Singapore Sevens in January 2026. Daveta also impressed in the final tournament of the regular season in New York at the 2026 USA Sevens, scoring 21 points across the weekend, including a hat-trick of tries against Spain to help set-up a semi-final versus Australia.
