= Jayden Nell =

South African rugby union player (born 2005)

- Born: 28 October 2004 (age 22)
- Height: 1.92 m (6 ft 4 in)
- Weight: 92 kg (203 lb)
- School: Hoërskool Durbanville

Rugby union career
- Position: Forward
National sevens team
Years	Team	Comps
2026–	South Africa	4
- Correct as of 28 July 2026

Jayden Nell (born 28 October 2004) is a South African professional rugby union player who plays for the South Africa national rugby sevens team. He made his debut for South Africa national rugby sevens team at the 2026 USA Sevens.

== Honours ==
South Africa Sevens

- SVNS Series
  - (gold) Champion (1): 2025–26

South Africa Sevens

- SVNS Grand Final
  - (gold) Champion (1): 2026
