= Kele Lasaqa =

New Zealand rugby union player

- Born: Tauranga, New Zealand
- School: Tauranga Boys' College
- Notable relative: Veveni Lasaqa (cousin)

Rugby union career
- Position: Winger
- Current team: Bay of Plenty
Senior career
Years	Team	Apps	(Points)
2025–	Bay of Plenty	8	
National sevens team
Years	Team		Comps
2025–	New Zealand Sevens		

Kele Lasaqa is a New Zealand rugby union player who plays as a winger for Bay of Plenty Steamers in the National Provincial Championship, and the New Zealand national rugby sevens team.

== Early life ==
Lasaqa attended Tauranga Boys' College. He was part of their rugby team which won the New Zealand national under-15 tournament, and then the prestigious Super 8 schools title in 2024, for the first time since 1999, as well as the Condors Sevens title.

== Career ==
Lasaqa plays on the wing for Bay of Plenty Steamers in the National Provincial Championship. For Bay of Plenty he scored five tries in six games and was promoted to the New Zealand Under-18 Sevens team. Lasaqa was part of the New Zealand Development team that participated in the Coral Coast Fiji 7s in Sigatoka, Fiji.

Lasaqa made his debut for the senior New Zealand national rugby sevens team as they won the 2025 Dubai Sevens, part of the 2025-26 SVNS series in November 2025. His performances included a match-clinching last minute tackle in a 21–17 win over Great Britain in the pool stage.

At the 2026 Singapore Sevens, Lasaqa scored a match winning try in the final minute from 65 metres out against Argentina. He was also a try scorer to help New Zealand reach the semi-finals of the 2026 Australia Sevens in a win against France. Kele Lasaqa was named Rookie SVNS Player of the Year in June 2026. He played for New Zealand U20 at the 2026 World Rugby U20 Championship.

== Personal life ==
From Fijian descent, his parents moved to New Zealand in 2003 from Ucunivanua in Verata. His brother, Gideon Lasaqa, plays for the Sydney Fijian team in the Coral Coast 7s. Their cousin is fellow New Zealand rugby player Veveni Lasaqa.
