= Anaick Konyi =

French rugby sevens player

Rugby union career
National sevens team
Years	Team	Comps
2026–	France	

Anaick Konyi is a French rugby union player from New Caledonia. She made her debut for the France women's national rugby sevens team in 2026. She was named Rookie of the Year at the conclusion of the 2025-26 SVNS series.

== Early life ==
From Kaméré, New Caledonia, where she was educated at the National Union of School Sports. Konyi started playing rugby at the age of 12 years-old at the Rugby Club Calédonien, and also participated in sports such as athletics and taekwondo, before focusing on rugby. In 2023, when she was 16, she moved to La Rochelle in mainland France and joined the rugby program at Lycée Dautet, combining studies and sport to earn her STMG technological baccalaureate with a specialisation in Human Resources in June 2025. She later studied for a BTS (Advanced Vocational Diploma) in Communication with a specialisation in Sports through distance learning.

== Career ==
Konyi joined the French Women's National Olympic Training Centre at the beginning of the 2025-26 season. Konyi made her debut for the France women's national rugby sevens team at the 2026 Singapore Sevens on 31 January.

Konyi scored her first international try for the national team in the semi-final at the 2026 Australia Sevens against New Zealand, scoring another try in the French third/fourth play off victory against the United States at the tournament in Perth. By the end of her maiden season with the team she had scored 18 tries. She was named Rookie of the Year at the conclusion of the 2025-26 SVNS series in June 2026 aged 19 years-old.
