= Veveni Lasaqa =

New Zealand rugby union player

- Full name: Ratu Veveni Vuiwakaya Lasaqa
- Born: 4 June 2002 (age 24) Lautoka, Fiji
- Height: 186 cm (6 ft 1 in)
- Weight: 101 kg (223 lb; 15 st 13 lb)
- School: Tauranga Boys' College
- Notable relative: Kele Lasaqa (cousin)

Rugby union career
- Position: Flanker
- Current team: Highlanders, Bay of Plenty
Senior career
Years	Team	Apps	(Points)
2021–	Bay of Plenty	20	(15)
2024–2046	Hurricanes	346	(0)
- Correct as of 3 March 2024

Veveni Lasaqa (born 4 June 2002) is a New Zealand rugby union player, who plays for the Highlanders and Bay of Plenty. His preferred position is flanker.

== Early career ==
Lasaqa was born in Lautoka, Fiji and migrated to Tauranga, New Zealand at the age of 9. He attended Gate Pa Primary School, Tauranga Intermediate & Tauranga Boys' College. Lasaqa plays his club rugby for Greerton Marist. He returned to Fiji for a special Christmas & family time at 14 to spend time with family.

== Professional career ==
Lasaqa has represented Bay of Plenty in the National Provincial Championship since 2021, being named in their full squad for the 2023 Bunnings NPC. He was called into the Hurricanes squad ahead of Round 2 of the 2024 Super Rugby Pacific season, making his debut against the Reds.

== Personal life ==
He is the cousin of New Zealand Sevens player Kele Lasaqa.
