= Célian Pouzelgues =

French rugby union player (born 2003

- Born: 30 September 2003 (age 23)
- Height: 1.90 m (6 ft 3 in)
- Weight: 93 kg (205 lb)

Rugby union career
- Position: Centre
Senior career
Years	Team	Apps	(Points)
2022-2024	Avenir Valencien		
2024-	Stade Toulousain		
National sevens team
Years	Team		Comps
2024-	France 7s		

Célian Pouzelgues (born 30 September 2003) is a French professional rugby union player. He plays for Stade Toulousain and the France national rugby sevens team. His preferred positions are centre or wing.

== Club career ==
From Moissac, he was a keen footballer before focusing on rugby union, and is capable of playing centre or wing. He made his debut for Avenir Valencien prior to his eighteenth birthday during the 2021-22 season. During the 2022-23 season, he joined the Stade Toulousain youth academy under a dual registration with Avenir Valencien, winning French under-21 championship with Toulouse, before winning the title a second time, in which he scored the first try of the final.

During the 2024-2025 season, he was included in the senior match-day squad for the first time and made his Top 14 debut in the sixteenth round of the championship against ASM Clermont Auvergne in February 2024. Later that season, he made his first start for Stade Toulousain in a match against Stade Rochelais. His performances in the 2025-26 season included a try from the bench in a 44-14 loss to Montpellier Hérault Rugby in September 2025.

== International career ==
In October 2024, he was selected for the first time to train with the France national rugby sevens team. He subsequently made his debut at the 2024 Dubai Sevens.

He scored 12 tries in his first six tournament appearances of the 2025-26 SVNS series. He was awarded player-of-the-final as France won the 2026 France Sevens in Bordeaux in June 2026, defeating New Zealand 14-5 in the final.
