= Rory McHaffie =

Scotland international rugby union player

- Born: 23 April 2007 (age 19)
- Height: 1.85 m (6 ft 1 in)
- Weight: 96 kg (212 lb)
- School: Peebles High School

Rugby union career
- Position(s): Full-back, Winger
- Current team: Edinburgh
Senior career
Years	Team	Apps	(Points)
2026–	Edinburgh		
International career
Years	Team	Apps	(Points)
2025	Scotland U18		
2026–	Scotland U20		
National sevens team
Years	Team		Comps
2026	Great Britain		

Rory McHaffie (born 23 April 2007) is a Scottish professional rugby union footballer who plays for Edinburgh Rugby and the Great Britain national rugby sevens team.

== Club career ==
From Peebles, McHaffie attended Peebles High School and played junior rugby union at Peebles RFC before progressing to play for the club in Scottish National League Division One. He joined the Edinburgh Rugby academy in 2025.

McHaffie made his senior debut for Edinburgh on the opening weekend of the 2026-27 season, appearing from he bench against Ulster Rugby in Belfast in the United Rugby Championship. The following weekend, he made his home debut and scored the winning try in a 17-13 win against Stormers.

== International career ==
A Scotland under-18 international, he went on to represent the Scotland national under-20 rugby union team during the 2026 U20 Six Nations, scoring on his debut in a win against Italy U20. He made his debut for the Great Britain national rugby sevens team at the Hong Kong Sevens during the 2025-26 SVNS series.
