= Jané Mulder =

South African rugby union player

- Born: 21 June 2005 (age 21)
- Notable relative: Japie Mulder (father)

Rugby union career
- Position: Wing
- Current team: UP Tuks
Provincial / State sides
Years	Team	Apps	(Points)
2024	Golden Lions U20		
International career
Years	Team	Apps	(Points)
2024–	South Africa U20		
National sevens team
Years	Team		Comps
2026–	South Africa		1

Jané Mulder (born 21 June 2005) is a South African international rugby union and sevens player, playing in the position of wing.

== Career ==
=== Rugby union ===
Jané as South Africa U20 in African U20 Women's Series at Paul Roos Gymnasium’s Markötter Stadium in Stellenbosch.

She a call-up to the BlitzBoks Women’s squad for the 2026 World Championship in Hong Kong.

== Personal life ==
She was living with her father, Japie Mulder at 1995 Rugby World Cup. She attended Helpmekaar Kollege and the University of Pretoria.
