= Zander Reynders =

South African rugby union player

- Full name: Zander Reynders
- Born: 19 December 2000 (age 25) Pretoria, South Africa
- Height: 191 cm (6 ft 3 in)
- Weight: 95 kg (209 lb)
- School: Midstream College, Centurion, Gauteng
- University: University of Pretoria

Rugby union career
- Position: Prop
- Current team: South Africa Sevens
International career
Years	Team	Apps	(Points)
2024–	South Africa Sevens	7	(10)
- Correct as of 16 November 2025

Zander Reynders (born 19 December 2000) is a South African rugby union player who currently plays for the South Africa national rugby sevens team.
