= 2025 Dubai Sevens =

World Rugby Sevens Series tournaments

- 2025–26 SVNS
- Host nation: UAE
- Date: 29–30 November 2025

Men
- Champion: New Zealand
- Runner-up: Australia
- Third: Fiji

Women
- Champion: New Zealand
- Runner-up: Australia
- Third: Japan

Tournament details
- Matches played: 40

The 2025 Dubai Sevens or SVNS Dubai was a rugby sevens tournament played at The Sevens Stadium. Eight men's teams and eight women's teams participated.

Reflecting that it was the start of the new season 21 women players made their debuts at Dubai.

New Zealand won the men's event defeating Australia in the final. New Zealand also won the women's event, defeating Australia in the final.

== Men's tournament ==
=== Pool stage ===
Points system: Teams were awarded 3 points for a win, 2 points for a draw and 0 points for a loss. For a loss of 7 points or fewer teams were awarded 1 bonus point.

Key to colours in pool tables
Teams that advanced to the cup semifinals
Teams that advanced to the 5th place semifinals

=== Pool A ===
Pos	Team	Pld	W	L	PF	PA	PD	BP	Pts
1	France	3	2	1	95	41	+54	1	7
2	Fiji	3	2	1	73	53	+20	1	7
3	Argentina	3	1	2	45	99	–54	1	4
4	South Africa	3	1	2	39	59	–20	1	4

29 November
13:10

Argentina	19–24	Fiji

The Sevens Stadium, Dubai

29 November
13:32

France	12–15	South Africa

The Sevens Stadium, Dubai

29 November
16:16

South Africa	10–28	Fiji

The Sevens Stadium, Dubai

29 November
16:38

Argentina	7–59	France

The Sevens Stadium, Dubai

29 November
20:12

France	24–19	Fiji

The Sevens Stadium, Dubai

29 November
20:34

South Africa	14–19	Argentina

The Sevens Stadium, Dubai

=== Pool B ===
Pos	Team	Pld	W	L	PF	PA	PD	BP	Pts
1	New Zealand	3	3	0	66	38	+28	0	9
2	Australia	3	2	1	57	45	+12	1	7
3	Great Britain	3	1	2	45	57	–12	1	4
4	Spain	3	0	3	24	52	–28	2	2

29 November
12:26

New Zealand	21–14	Great Britain

The Sevens Stadium, Dubai

29 November
12:48

Australia	14–7	Spain

The Sevens Stadium, Dubai

29 November
15:32

Spain	10–14	Great Britain

The Sevens Stadium, Dubai

29 November
15:54

New Zealand	21–17	Australia

The Sevens Stadium, Dubai

29 November
19:28

Spain	7–24	New Zealand

The Sevens Stadium, Dubai

29 November
19:50

Australia	26–17	Great Britain

The Sevens Stadium, Dubai

=== 5th to 8th playoffs ===
5th place semifinals
30 November– 11:32 – The Sevens Stadium
Argentina	28
Spain	31
30 November– 11:54 – The Sevens Stadium
Great Britain	0
South Africa	34

5th place final
30 November– 17:06 – The Sevens Stadium
Spain	12
South Africa	21
7th place final
30 November– 14:58 – The Sevens Stadium
Argentina	19
Great Britain	24

=== Cup ===
Semifinals
30 November– 14:06 – The Sevens Stadium
France	0
Australia	14
30 November– 14:28 – The Sevens Stadium
New Zealand	24
Fiji	21

Final
30 November– 20:11 – The Sevens Stadium
Australia	22
New Zealand	26
Bronze final
30 November– 19:03 – The Sevens Stadium
France	7
Fiji	24

=== Final placings ===
Place	Team
1st place, gold medalist(s)	New Zealand
2nd place, silver medalist(s)	Australia
3rd place, bronze medalist(s)	Fiji
4	France
5	South Africa
6	Spain
7	Great Britain
8	Argentina

== Women's tournament ==
=== Pool stage ===
Points system: Teams were awarded 3 points for a win, 2 points for a draw and 0 points for a loss. For a loss of 7 points or fewer teams were awarded 1 bonus point.

Key to colours in pool tables
Teams that advanced to the cup semifinals
Teams that advanced to the 5th place semifinals

=== Pool A ===
Pos	Team	Pld	W	L	PF	PA	PD	BP	Pts
1	New Zealand	3	2	1	72	54	+18	1	7
2	Fiji	3	2	1	59	57	+2	0	6
3	United States	3	2	1	55	50	+5	0	6
4	France	3	0	3	54	79	–25	1	1

29 November
10:58

New Zealand	24–21	France

The Sevens Stadium, Dubai

29 November
11:20

United States	7–19	Fiji

The Sevens Stadium, Dubai

29 November
13:59

Fiji	28–19	France

The Sevens Stadium, Dubai

29 November
14:21

New Zealand	17-21	United States

The Sevens Stadium, Dubai

29 November
17:05

United States	27–14	France

The Sevens Stadium, Dubai

29 November
17:27

New Zealand	31–12	Fiji

The Sevens Stadium, Dubai

=== Pool B ===
Pos	Team	Pld	W	L	PF	PA	PD	BP	Pts
1	Australia	3	3	0	110	24	+86	0	9
2	Japan	3	2	1	64	55	+9	0	6
3	Canada	3	1	2	77	50	+27	2	5
4	Great Britain	3	0	3	10	132	–122	0	0

29 November
11:42

Australia	31–7	Japan

The Sevens Stadium, Dubai

29 November
12:04

Canada	41–5	Great Britain

The Sevens Stadium, Dubai

29 November
14:43

Great Britain	5–36	Japan

The Sevens Stadium, Dubai

29 November
15:05

Australia	24–17	Canada

The Sevens Stadium, Dubai

29 November
17:49

Canada	19–21	Japan

The Sevens Stadium, Dubai

29 November
18:11

Australia	55–0	Great Britain

The Sevens Stadium, Dubai

=== 5th to 8th playoffs ===
5th place semifinals
30 November – 10:48 – The Sevens Stadium
United States	49
Great Britain	14
30 November – 11:10 – The Sevens Stadium
Canada	19
France	12

5th place final
30 November – 16:44 – The Sevens Stadium
United States	19
Canada	14
7th place final
30 November – 15:20 – The Sevens Stadium
Great Britain	5
France	46

=== Cup ===
Semifinals
30 November – 13:12 – The Sevens Stadium
New Zealand	31
Japan	5
30 November – 13:34 – The Sevens Stadium
Australia	31
Fiji	10

Final
30 November – 19:35 – The Sevens Stadium
New Zealand	29
Australia	14
Bronze final
30 November – 18:35 – The Sevens Stadium
Japan	22
Fiji	12

=== Final placings ===
Place	Team
1st place, gold medalist(s)	New Zealand
2nd place, silver medalist(s)	Australia
3rd place, bronze medalist(s)	Japan
4	Fiji
5	United States
6	Canada
7	France
8	Great Britain

2025–26 SVNS
Preceded by None (first event)	2025 Dubai Sevens	Succeeded by 2025 South Africa Sevens
