= Sunni Jardine =

English rugby union player

- Born: 30 December 1999 (age 26)
- Height: 1.83 m (6 ft 0 in)
- Weight: 93 kg (205 lb)
- University: University of Birmingham

Rugby union career
- Position: Fly half
Senior career
Years	Team	Apps	(Points)
-2020	Wasps		
2020-2021	Bournville		
2021-2022	Boucau-Tarnos		
2023	Union Bordeaux Bègles		
2023	Floirac		
2023-2024	Rosslyn Park		
2026	Chennai Bulls		
National sevens team
Years	Team		Comps
2024-	GB 7s		

Sunni Jardine (born 30 December 1999) is an English rugby union footballer who plays as a fly half and plays for the Great Britain national rugby sevens team.

== Club career ==
He was a youngster at Wasps RFC and featured for the club in the Premiership Rugby Sevens Series and Premiership Rugby Cup. He signed for Bournville RFC in 2020.

He played the 2021-22 season in France for Boucau-Tarnos. He later signed in France for Union Bordeaux Bègles and also played in France for Floirac.

Returning to England he played for Rosslyn Park in 2023 and 2024.

== International career ==
He was the top try scorer for GB Sevens at the 2024 Rugby Europe Sevens Championship Series in Croatia in June 2024. He featured for GB Sevens at the Dubai Sevens in November 2024, the opening of the 2024-25 SVNS series, as the team reached the quarterfinals.

== Personal life ==
He attended the University of Birmingham.
