= Nabo Sokoyi =

South African rugby union player

- Full name: Sonwabo Sokoyi
- Born: 22 May 2002 (age 24) Upington, South Africa
- School: Grey College, Bloemfontein, Free State

Rugby union career
- Position: Wing
- Current team: South Africa Sevens
Senior career
Years	Team	Apps	(Points)
2026	Mumbai Dreamers		
International career
Years	Team	Apps	(Points)
2025–	South Africa Sevens	3	(10)
- Correct as of 8 February 2026

Sonwabo "Nabo" Sokoyi (born 22 June 2002) is a South African rugby union player who currently plays for the South Africa national rugby sevens team.
