= 2026 Canada Sevens =

World Rugby Sevens Series tournaments

2026 Australia Sevens
- 2025–26 SVNS
- Host nation: Canada
- Date: 7–8 March 2026

Men
- Champion: South Africa
- Runner-up: Spain
- Third: Fiji

Women
- Champion: New Zealand
- Runner-up: Australia
- Third: United States

Tournament details
- Matches played: 40

The 2026 Canada Sevens or SVNS VAN was a rugby sevens tournament played at BC Place in Vancouver. Eight men's teams and eight women's teams participated. In addition to the SVNS tournament, there was also an invitational pool for 3 men's teams called the Teck Tri Nations Challenge.

== Men's tournament ==
=== Pool stage ===
Points system: Teams were awarded 3 points for a win, 2 points for a draw and 0 points for a loss. For a loss of 7 points or fewer teams were awarded 1 bonus point.

Key to colours in pool tables
Teams that advanced to the Cup semifinals
Teams that advanced to the 5th place semifinals

=== Pool A ===
Pos	Team	Pld	W	L	PF	PA	PD	BP	Pts
1	South Africa	3	3	0	66	24	+42	0	9
2	Spain	3	2	1	29	38	–9	0	6
3	New Zealand	3	1	2	46	34	+12	2	5
4	Great Britain	3	0	3	10	55	–44	0	0

7 March
11:41

New Zealand	10–12	Spain

BC Place, Vancouver

7 March
12:03

South Africa	21–5	Great Britain

BC Place, Vancouver

8 March
15:29

New Zealand	24–5	Great Britain

BC Place, Vancouver

8 March
15:51

South Africa	28–7	Spain

BC Place, Vancouver

8 March
19:18

Spain	10–0	Great Britain

BC Place, Vancouver

8 March
19:40

South Africa	17–12	New Zealand

BC Place, Vancouver

=== Pool B ===
Pos	Team	Pld	W	L	PF	PA	PD	BP	Pts
1	Fiji	3	2	1	75	52	+23	1	7
2	Australia	3	2	1	50	57	–7	0	6
3	France	3	1	2	56	67	–11	1	4
4	Argentina	3	1	2	44	59	–15	1	4

7 March
10:57

Australia	17–15	Argentina

BC Place, Vancouver

7 March
11:19

Fiji	26–21	France

BC Place, Vancouver

8 March
14:45

Australia	19–7	France

BC Place, Vancouver

8 March
15:07

Fiji	14–17	Argentina

BC Place, Vancouver

8 March
18:34

Argentina	12–28	France

BC Place, Vancouver

8 March
18:56

Fiji	35–14	Australia

BC Place, Vancouver

=== Teck Tri Nations Challenge ===
7 March
10:30

Japan	28–26	Chile

BC Place, Vancouver

7 March
14:18

Canada	28–26	Japan

BC Place, Vancouver

7 March
18:07

Canada	7–0	Chile

BC Place, Vancouver

8 March
10:30

Japan	10–12	Chile

BC Place, Vancouver

8 March
14:06

Canada	10–12	Chile

BC Place, Vancouver

8 March
16:59

Canada	31–7	Japan

BC Place, Vancouver

=== 5th to 8th playoffs ===
5th place semifinals
8 March– 10:52 – BC Place
New Zealand	21
Argentina	24
8 March– 11:14 – BC Place
France	21
Great Britain	19

5th place final
8 March– 15:26 – BC Place
Argentina	34
France	15
7th place final
8 March– 14:42 – BC Place
New Zealand	29
Great Britain	5

=== Cup ===
Semifinals
8 March– 12:33 – BC Place
South Africa	19
Australia	12
8 March– 12:55 – BC Place
Fiji	17
Spain	24

Final
8 March– 17:34 – BC Place
South Africa	38
Spain	12
Bronze final
8 March– 16:20 – BC Place
Australia	10
Fiji	29

=== Final placings ===
Place	Team
1st place, gold medalist(s)	South Africa
2nd place, silver medalist(s)	Spain
3rd place, bronze medalist(s)	Fiji
4	Australia
5	Argentina
6	France
7	New Zealand
8	Great Britain

=== Dream Team ===
Forwards	Backs
Impi Visser (Fiji) Vuiviawa Naduvalo (Spain) Jeremy Trevithick	(Fiji) Terio Veilawa (Spain) Eduardo Lopez (South Africa) Shilton van Wyk; Tristan Leyds

== Women's tournament ==
=== Pool stage ===
Points system: Teams were awarded 3 points for a win, 2 points for a draw and 0 points for a loss. For a loss of 7 points or fewer teams were awarded 1 bonus point.

Key to colours in pool tables
Teams that advanced to the Cup semifinals
Teams that advanced to the 5th place semifinals

=== Pool A ===
Pos	Team	Pld	W	L	PF	PA	PD	BP	Pts
1	New Zealand	3	3	0	116	27	+89	0	9
2	France	3	2	1	77	43	+34	0	6
3	Japan	3	1	2	36	72	–36	0	3
4	Great Britain	3	0	3	17	104	–87	0	0

7 March
12:25

France	22–0	Japan

BC Place, Vancouver

7 March
12:47

New Zealand	35 – 5	Great Britain

BC Place, Vancouver

7 March
16:13

France	38–5	Great Britain

BC Place, Vancouver

7 March
16:35

New Zealand	43–5	Japan

BC Place, Vancouver

7 March
20:02

Japan	31–7	Great Britain

BC Place, Vancouver

7 March
20:24

New Zealand	38–17	France

BC Place, Vancouver

=== Pool B ===
Pos	Team	Pld	W	L	PF	PA	PD	BP	Pts
1	Australia	3	3	0	86	43	+43	0	9
2	United States	3	2	1	73	48	+25	0	6
3	Fiji	3	1	2	57	76	–19	1	4
4	Canada	3	0	3	31	80	–49	1	1

7 March
13:09

United States	40–7	Canada

BC Place, Vancouver

7 March
13:31

Australia	38–24	Fiji

BC Place, Vancouver

7 March
16:57

United States	26–19	Fiji

BC Place, Vancouver

7 March
17:19

Australia	26–12	Canada

BC Place, Vancouver

7 March
20:46

Canada	12–14	Fiji

BC Place, Vancouver

7 March
21:08

Australia	22–7	United States

BC Place, Vancouver

=== 5th to 8th playoffs ===
5th place semifinals
8 March– 11:36 – BC Place
Japan	12
Canada	19
8 March– 11:58 – BC Place
Fiji	32
Great Britain	0

5th place final
8 March– 15:48 – BC Place
Canada	26
Fiji	19
7th place final
8 March– 15:04 – BC Place
Japan	34
Great Britain	19

=== Cup ===
Semifinals
8 March– 13:17 – BC Place
New Zealand	19
United States	12
8 March– 13:39 – BC Place
Australia	14
France	5

Final
8 March– 18:08 – BC Place
New Zealand	24
Australia	17
Bronze final
8 March– 16:42 – BC Place
United States	35
France	21

=== Final placings ===
Place	Team
1st place, gold medalist(s)	New Zealand
2nd place, silver medalist(s)	Australia
3rd place, bronze medalist(s)	United States
4	France
5	Canada
6	Fiji
7	Japan
8	Great Britain

=== Dream Team ===
Forwards	Backs
(New Zealand) Jorja Miller (Australia) Maddison Levi (United States) Su Adegoke	(New Zealand) Risi Pouri-Lane (United States) Kaylen Thomas (France) Anaick Konyi; Jaymie Kolose

2025–26 SVNS
Preceded by 2026 Australia Sevens	2026 Canada Sevens	Succeeded by 2026 USA Sevens
