= 2025 South Africa Sevens =

World Rugby Sevens Series tournaments

- 2025–26 SVNS
- Host nation: South Africa
- Date: 6–7 December 2025

Men
- Champion: South Africa
- Runner-up: Argentina
- Third: Fiji

Women
- Champion: Australia
- Runner-up: New Zealand
- Third: France

Tournament details
- Matches played: 40

The 2025 South Africa Sevens or SVNS Cape Town was a rugby sevens tournament played at DHL Stadium. Eight men's teams and eight women's teams participated.

== Men's tournament ==
=== Pool stage ===
Points system: Teams were awarded 3 points for a win, 2 points for a draw and 0 points for a loss. For a loss of 7 points or fewer teams were awarded 1 bonus point.

Key to colours in pool tables
Teams that advanced to the Cup semifinals
Teams that advanced to the 5th place semifinals

=== Pool A ===
Pos	Team	Pld	W	L	PF	PA	PD	BP	Pts
1	South Africa	3	3	0	84	42	+42	0	9
2	Fiji	3	2	1	77	46	+31	1	7
3	New Zealand	3	1	2	48	66	–18	1	4
4	Great Britain	3	0	3	36	91	–55	1	1

6 December
12:22

New Zealand	29–12	Great Britain

DHL Stadium, Cape Town

6 December
12:44

Fiji	21–24	South Africa

DHL Stadium, Cape Town

6 December
15:38

Fiji	21–17	Great Britain

DHL Stadium, Cape Town

6 December
16:00

New Zealand	14–19	South Africa

DHL Stadium, Cape Town

6 December
19:19

New Zealand	5–35	Fiji

DHL Stadium, Cape Town

6 December
19:41

South Africa	41–7	Great Britain

DHL Stadium, Cape Town

=== Pool B ===
Pos	Team	Pld	W	L	PF	PA	PD	BP	Pts
1	Argentina	3	2	1	86	50	+36	1	7
2	France	3	2	1	67	48	+19	1	7
3	Spain	3	2	1	64	62	+2	1	7
4	Australia	3	0	3	27	84	–57	1	1

6 December
11:38

France	19–14	Spain

DHL Stadium, Cape Town

6 December
12:00

Australia	0–36	Argentina

DHL Stadium, Cape Town

6 December
14:54

France	19–24	Argentina

DHL Stadium, Cape Town

6 December
15:16

Australia	17–19	Spain

DHL Stadium, Cape Town

6 December
18:35

Spain	31–26	Argentina

DHL Stadium, Cape Town

6 December
18:57

Australia	10–29	France

DHL Stadium, Cape Town

=== 5th to 8th playoffs ===
5th place semifinals
7 December– 10:44 – DHL Stadium
New Zealand	28
Australia	21
7 December– 11:06 – DHL Stadium
Spain	10
Great Britain	29

5th place final
7 December– 14:34 – DHL Stadium
New Zealand	27
Great Britain	12
7th place final
7 December– 13:50 – DHL Stadium
Australia	24
Spain	12

=== Cup ===
Semifinals
7 December– 12:22 – DHL Stadium
South Africa	22
France	17
7 December– 12:44 – DHL Stadium
Argentina	29
Fiji	21

Final
7 December– 16:43 – DHL Stadium
South Africa	21
Argentina	19
Bronze final
7 December– 15:42 – DHL Stadium
France	19
Fiji	26

=== Final placings ===
Place	Team
1st place, gold medalist(s)	South Africa
2nd place, silver medalist(s)	Argentina
3rd place, bronze medalist(s)	Fiji
4	France
5	New Zealand
6	Great Britain
7	Australia
8	Spain

== Women's tournament ==
=== Pool stage ===
Points system: Teams were awarded 3 points for a win, 2 points for a draw and 0 points for a loss. For a loss of 7 points or fewer teams were awarded 1 bonus point.

Key to colours in pool tables
Teams that advanced to the Cup semifinals
Teams that advanced to the 5th place semifinals

=== Pool A ===
Pos	Team	Pld	W	L	PF	PA	PD	BP	Pts
1	New Zealand	3	3	0	107	41	+66	0	9
2	United States	3	2	1	58	62	–4	0	6
3	Fiji	3	1	2	66	46	+20	0	3
4	Great Britain	3	0	3	27	109	–82	0	0

6 December
10:44

Fiji	7-15	United States

DHL Stadium, Cape Town

6 December
11:06

New Zealand	38-10	Great Britain

DHL Stadium, Cape Town

6 December
14:00

Fiji	40-0	Great Britain

DHL Stadium, Cape Town

6 December
14:22

New Zealand	38-12	United States

DHL Stadium, Cape Town

6 December
17:26

United States	31-17	Great Britain

DHL Stadium, Cape Town

6 December
17:48

New Zealand	31-19	Fiji

DHL Stadium, Cape Town

=== Pool B ===
Pos	Team	Pld	W	L	PF	PA	PD	BP	Pts
1	Australia	3	3	0	103	24	+79	0	9
2	France	3	2	1	60	72	–12	0	6
3	Japan	3	1	2	50	84	–34	0	3
4	Canada	3	0	3	50	83	–33	2	2

6 December
10:00

Japan	26-19	Canada

DHL Stadium, Cape Town

6 December
10:22

Australia	41-0	France

DHL Stadium, Cape Town

6 December
13:16

Japan	19-29	France

DHL Stadium, Cape Town

6 December
13:38

Australia	26-19	Canada

DHL Stadium, Cape Town

6 December
16:42

Canada	12-31	France

DHL Stadium, Cape Town

6 December
17:04

Australia	36-5	Japan

DHL Stadium, Cape Town

=== 5th to 8th playoffs ===
5th place semifinals
7 December– 10:00 – DHL Stadium
Fiji	14
Canada	33
7 December– 10:22 – DHL Stadium
Japan	25
Great Britain	7

5th place final
7 December– 14:12 – DHL Stadium
Canada	10
Japan	12
7th place final
7 December– 13:28 – DHL Stadium
Fiji	43
Great Britain	7

=== Cup ===
Semifinals
7 December– 11:38 – DHL Stadium
New Zealand	19
France	7
7 December– 12:00 – DHL Stadium
Australia	34
United States	7

Final
7 December– 16:10 – DHL Stadium
New Zealand	12
Australia	26
Bronze final
7 December– 15:20 – DHL Stadium
France	15
United States	12

=== Final placings ===
Place	Team
1st place, gold medalist(s)	Australia
2nd place, silver medalist(s)	New Zealand
3rd place, bronze medalist(s)	France
4	United States
5	Japan
6	Canada
7	Fiji
8	Great Britain

2025–26 SVNS
Preceded by 2025 Dubai Sevens	2025 South Africa Sevens	Succeeded by 2026 Singapore Sevens
