= 2026 Australia Sevens =

World Rugby Sevens Series tournaments

- 2025–26 SVNS
- Host nation: Australia
- Date: 7–8 February 2026

Men
- Champion: South Africa
- Runner-up: Fiji
- Third: Australia

Women
- Champion: New Zealand
- Runner-up: Australia
- Third: France

Tournament details
- Matches played: 40

The 2026 Australia Sevens or SVNS PER was a rugby sevens tournament played at HBF Park. Eight men's teams and eight women's teams participated.

== Men's tournament ==
=== Pool stage ===
Points system: Teams were awarded 3 points for a win, 2 points for a draw and 0 points for a loss. For a loss of 7 points or fewer teams were awarded 1 bonus point.

Key to colours in pool tables
Teams that advanced to the Cup quarterfinals
Teams that advanced to the 5th place semifinals

=== Pool A ===
Pos	Team	Pld	W	L	PF	PA	PD	BP	Pts
1	Fiji	3	3	0	72	48	+24	0	9
2	South Africa	3	2	1	66	46	+20	1	7
3	Spain	3	1	2	64	78	–14	1	4
4	Argentina	3	0	3	41	71	–30	2	2

7 February
11:58

South Africa	33–14	Spain

HBF Park, Perth

7 February
12:20

Fiji	26–10	Argentina

HBF Park, Perth

7 February
15:14

South Africa	19–12	Argentina

HBF Park, Perth

7 February
15:36

Fiji	26–24	Spain

HBF Park, Perth

7 February
18:30

Spain	26–19	Argentina

HBF Park, Perth

7 February
18:52

Fiji	20–14	South Africa

HBF Park, Perth

=== Pool B ===
Pos	Team	Pld	W	L	PF	PA	PD	BP	Pts
1	Australia	3	3	0	74	49	+25	0	9
2	New Zealand	3	1	2	59	68	–9	2	5
3	France	3	1	2	71	65	+6	1	4
4	Great Britain	3	1	2	57	49	–22	1	4

7 February
12:42

France	36–10	Great Britain

HBF Park, Perth

7 February
13:04

New Zealand	14–21	Australia

HBF Park, Perth

7 February
15:58

New Zealand	19–26	Great Britain

HBF Park, Perth

7 February
16:20

France	14–29	Australia

HBF Park, Perth

7 February
19:14

France	21–26	New Zealand

HBF Park, Perth

7 February
19:36

Australia	24–21	Great Britain

HBF Park, Perth

=== 5th to 8th playoffs ===
5th place semifinals
8 February– 11:14 – HBF Park
Spain	28
Great Britain	19
8 February– 11:36 – HBF Park
France	12
Argentina	47

5th place final
8 February– 14:57 – HBF Park
Spain	19
Argentina	24
7th place final
8 February– 14:13 – HBF Park
Great Britain	17
France	24

=== Cup ===
Semifinals
8 February– 12:57 – HBF Park
Fiji	35
New Zealand	0
8 February– 13:19 – HBF Park
Australia	12
South Africa	28

Final
8 February– 17:04 – HBF Park
Fiji	19
South Africa	21
Bronze final
8 February– 15:57 – HBF Park
New Zealand	10
Australia	12

=== Final placings ===
Place	Team
1st place, gold medalist(s)	South Africa
2nd place, silver medalist(s)	Fiji
3rd place, bronze medalist(s)	Australia
4	New Zealand
5	Argentina
6	Spain
7	France
8	Great Britain

=== Dream Team ===
Forwards	Backs
(South Africa) Ryan Oosthuizen (Fiji) Vuiviawa Naduvalo (Australia) Henry Hutchison	(Fiji) Terio Veilawa (Australia) Ben Dowling (South Africa) Sebastiaan Jobb; Ricardo Duarttee

== Women's tournament ==
=== Pool stage ===
Points system: Teams were awarded 3 points for a win, 2 points for a draw and 0 points for a loss. For a loss of 7 points or fewer teams were awarded 1 bonus point.

Key to colours in pool tables
Teams that advanced to the Cup semifinals
Teams that advanced to the 5th place semifinals

=== Pool A ===
Pos	Team	Pld	W	L	PF	PA	PD	BP	Pts
1	New Zealand	3	3	0	101	17	+84	0	9
2	United States	3	2	1	72	60	+12	0	6
3	Japan	3	1	2	57	86	–29	0	3
4	Fiji	3	0	3	34	101	–67	0	0

7 February
10:30

United States	34–15	Fiji

HBF Park, Perth

7 February
10:52

New Zealand	34–12	Japan

HBF Park, Perth

7 February
13:36

United States	38–14	Japan

HBF Park, Perth

7 February
13:58

New Zealand	36–5	Fiji

HBF Park, Perth

7 February
16:52

Fiji	14–31	Japan

HBF Park, Perth

7 February
17:14

New Zealand	31–0	United States

HBF Park, Perth

=== Pool B ===
Pos	Team	Pld	W	L	PF	PA	PD	BP	Pts
1	Australia	3	3	0	118	27	+91	0	9
2	France	3	2	1	78	48	+30	0	6
3	Canada	3	1	2	67	69	–2	0	3
4	Great Britain	3	3	0	22	141	–119	0	0

7 February
11:14

Canada	12–24	France

HBF Park, Perth

7 February
11:36

Australia	54–5	Great Britain

HBF Park, Perth

7 February
14:20

Canada	45–7	Great Britain

HBF Park, Perth

7 February
14:42

Australia	26–12	France

HBF Park, Perth

7 February
17:36

France	42–10	Great Britain

HBF Park, Perth

7 February
17:58

Australia	38–10	Canada

HBF Park, Perth

=== 5th to 8th playoffs ===
5th place semifinals
8 February– 10:30 – HBF Park
Japan	29
Great Britain	7
8 February– 10:52 – HBF Park
Canada	26
Fiji	19

5th place final
8 February– 14:35 – HBF Park
Japan	5
Canada	36
7th place final
8 February– 13:51 – HBF Park
Great Britain	5
Fiji	41

=== Cup ===
Semifinals
8 February– 12:13 – HBF Park
New Zealand	34
France	14
8 February– 12:35 – HBF Park
Australia	26
United States	5

Final
8 February– 16:28 – HBF Park
New Zealand	29
Australia	7
Bronze final
8 February– 15:35 – HBF Park
France	21
United States	14

=== Final placings ===
Place	Team
1st place, gold medalist(s)	New Zealand
2nd place, silver medalist(s)	Australia
3rd place, bronze medalist(s)	France
4	United States
5	Canada
6	Japan
7	Fiji
8	Great Britain

=== Dream Team ===
Forwards	Backs
(New Zealand) Jorja Miller (Australia) Maddison Levi (France) Lili Dezou	(Australia) Tia Hinds (Australia) Madison Ashby (New Zealand) Kelsey Teneti; Risi Pouri-Lane

2025–26 SVNS
Preceded by 2026 Singapore Sevens	2026 Australia Sevens	Succeeded by 2026 Canada Sevens
