= 2026 Singapore Sevens =

World Rugby Sevens Series tournaments

- 2025–26 SVNS
- Host nation: Singapore
- Date: 31 January–1 February 2026

Men
- Champion: Fiji
- Runner-up: France
- Third: New Zealand

Women
- Champion: New Zealand
- Runner-up: Australia
- Third: Canada

Tournament details
- Matches played: 40

The 2026 Singapore Sevens or SVNS Singapore was a rugby sevens tournament played at National Stadium. Eight men's teams and eight women's teams participated.

== Men's tournament ==
=== Pool stage ===
Points system: Teams were awarded 3 points for a win, 2 points for a draw and 0 points for a loss. For a loss of 7 points or fewer teams were awarded 1 bonus point.

Key to colours in pool tables
Teams that advanced to the Cup semifinals
Teams that advanced to the 5th place semifinals

=== Pool A ===
Pos	Team	Pld	W	L	PF	PA	PD	BP	Pts
1	Fiji	3	3	0	74	45	29	0	9
2	South Africa	3	2	1	73	50	23	1	7
3	Spain	3	1	2	50	63	–13	1	4
4	Great Britain	3	0	3	45	84	–39	1	1

31 January
12:32

Fiji	22–19	Great Britain

National Stadium, Singapore

31 January
12:54

South Africa	21–14	Spain

National Stadium, Singapore

31 January
15:58

Fiji	28–7	Spain

National Stadium, Singapore

31 January
16:20

South Africa	33–12	Great Britain

National Stadium, Singapore

31 January
19:24

Great Britain	14–29	Spain

National Stadium, Singapore

31 January
19:46

South Africa	19–24 (a.e.t.)	Fiji

National Stadium, Singapore

=== Pool B ===
Pos	Team	Pld	W	L	PF	PA	PD	BP	Pts
1	France	3	3	0	69	34	+35	0	9
2	New Zealand	3	2	1	67	49	+18	1	7
3	Australia	3	1	2	36	74	–38	0	3
4	Argentina	3	0	3	49	64	–15	3	3

31 January
11:48

France	19–12	New Zealand

National Stadium, Singapore

31 January
12:10

Argentina	14–19	Australia

National Stadium, Singapore

31 January
15:14

France	31–7	Australia

National Stadium, Singapore

31 January
15:36

Argentina	20–26	New Zealand

National Stadium, Singapore

31 January
18:40

New Zealand	29–10	Australia

National Stadium, Singapore

31 January
19:02

Argentina	15–19	France

National Stadium, Singapore

=== 5th to 8th playoffs ===
5th place semifinals
1 February– 12:44 – National Stadium
Spain	26
Argentina	12
1 February– 13:06 – National Stadium
Australia	26
Great Britain	19

5th place final
1 February– 16:42 – National Stadium
Spain	12
Australia	26
7th place final
1 February– 15:58 – National Stadium
Argentina	14
Great Britain	10

=== Cup ===
Semifinals
1 February– 14:52 – National Stadium
Fiji	21
New Zealand	14
1 February– 15:14 – National Stadium
France	12
South Africa	5

Final
1 February– 19:41 – National Stadium
Fiji	21
France	12
Bronze final
1 February– 18:33 – National Stadium
New Zealand	14
South Africa	12

=== Final placings ===
Place	Team
1st place, gold medalist(s)	Fiji
2nd place, silver medalist(s)	France
3rd place, bronze medalist(s)	New Zealand
4	South Africa
5	Australia
6	Spain
7	Argentina
8	Great Britain

=== Dream Team ===
Forwards	Backs
(France) Andy Timo (Fiji) Vuiviawa Naduvalo (New Zealand) Rob Rush	(Fiji) Terio Veilawa (Fiji) Makani Boganisoko (France) Paulin Riva; Kele Lasaqa

== Women's tournament ==
=== Pool stage ===
Points system: Teams were awarded 3 points for a win, 2 points for a draw and 0 points for a loss. For a loss of 7 points or fewer teams were awarded 1 bonus point.

Key to colours in pool tables
Teams that advanced to the Cup semifinals
Teams that advanced to the 5th place semifinals

=== Pool A ===
Pos	Team	Pld	W	L	PF	PA	PD	BP	Pts
1	Australia	3	3	0	87	45	+42	0	9
2	United States	3	2	1	58	57	+1	1	7
3	Fiji	3	1	2	53	64	–11	1	4
4	Japan	3	0	3	50	82	–32	2	2

31 January
11:04

United States	22–19	Japan

National Stadium, Singapore

31 January
11:26

Australia	35–7	Fiji

National Stadium, Singapore

31 January
14:30

United States	17–12 (a.e.t.)	Fiji

National Stadium, Singapore

31 January
14:52

Australia	26–19	Japan

National Stadium, Singapore

31 January
17:56

Japan	12–34	Fiji

National Stadium, Singapore

31 January
18:18

Australia	26–19	United States

National Stadium, Singapore

=== Pool B ===
Pos	Team	Pld	W	L	PF	PA	PD	BP	Pts
1	New Zealand	3	3	0	138	19	+119	0	9
2	Canada	3	2	1	93	43	+50	1	7
3	France	3	1	2	63	89	–26	1	4
4	Great Britain	3	0	3	5	148	–143	0	0

31 January
10:42

France	24–29	Canada

National Stadium, Singapore

31 January
10:42

New Zealand	64–0	Great Britain

National Stadium, Singapore

31 January
13:46

France	32–5	Great Britain

National Stadium, Singapore

31 January
14:08

New Zealand	19–12	Canada

National Stadium, Singapore

31 January
17:12

Canada	52–0	Great Britain

National Stadium, Singapore

31 January
17:34

New Zealand	55–7	France

National Stadium, Singapore

=== 5th to 8th playoffs ===
5th place semifinals
1 February– 12:00 – National Stadium
Fiji	36
Great Britain	12
1 February– 12:22 – National Stadium
France	32
Japan	0

5th place final
1 February– 16:20 – National Stadium
Fiji	14
France	17
7th place final
1 February– 15:36 – National Stadium
Great Britain	5
Japan	41

=== Cup ===
Semifinals
1 February– 14:08 – National Stadium
Australia	35
Canada	10
1 February– 14:30 – National Stadium
New Zealand	44
United States	7

Final
1 February– 19:05 – National Stadium
Australia	7
New Zealand	36
Bronze final
1 February– 18:05 – National Stadium
Canada	24 (a.e.t.)
United States	19

=== Final placings ===
Place	Team
1st place, gold medalist(s)	New Zealand
2nd place, silver medalist(s)	Australia
3rd place, bronze medalist(s)	Canada
4	United States
5	France
6	Fiji
7	Japan
8	Great Britain

=== Dream Team ===
Forwards	Backs
(New Zealand) Jorja Miller (Australia) Maddison Levi (United States) Kaylen Thomas	(Canada) Olivia Apps (Australia) Maya Stewart (New Zealand) Jazmin Felix-Hotham; Mahina Paul

2025–26 SVNS
Preceded by 2025 South Africa Sevens	2026 Singapore Sevens	Succeeded by 2026 Australia Sevens
