= Ricardo Duarttee =

South African rugby union player

- Full name: Ricardo James Duarttee
- Born: 15 March 1998 (age 28)
- Height: 1.70 m (5 ft 7 in)
- Weight: 83 kg (183 lb; 13 st 1 lb)

Rugby union career
- Position: Utility back
Senior career
| Years | Team | Apps | (Points) |
| 2019–2020 | Boland Cavaliers | 8 | (5) |
| 2022 | Western Province | 0 | (0) |
| 2026 | Kolkata Banga Tigers | | |
International career
| Years | Team | Apps | (Points) |
| 2022 | South Africa Sevens | 21 | (95) |

Ricardo James Duarttee (born 15 March 1998) is a South African rugby union player, playing with the South Africa national rugby sevens team.

== International rugby career ==
He debuted for the Blitzboks in 2022 at the Dubai tournament where his performances earned him the nickname of Tricky Ricky.
