= 2026 Hong Kong Sevens =

World Rugby Sevens Series tournaments

- 2025–26 SVNS
- Host nation: Hong Kong

Men
- Date: 17–19 April
- Champion: South Africa
- Runner-up: Argentina
- Third: Spain

Women
- Date: 17–19 April
- Champion: New Zealand
- Runner-up: Australia
- Third: France

Tournament details
- Matches played: 64

The 2026 Hong Kong Sevens or SVNS HKG was a rugby sevens tournament played at Kai Tak Stadium. Fifteen men's teams and fifteen women's teams participated.

It is also the first leg of the World Championship Series. In addition to the SVNS tournament, there was also an invitational competition called the Melrose Claymores.

== Men's tournament ==
=== Pool stage ===
Points system: Teams were awarded 3 points for a win, 2 points for a draw and 0 points for a loss. For a loss of 7 points or fewer teams were awarded 1 bonus point.

Key to colours in pool tables
Teams that advanced to the cup quarterfinals
Teams that advanced to the 9th place semifinals

=== Pool A ===
Pos	Team	Pld	W	L	PF	PA	PD	BP	Pts
1	South Africa	3	2	1	62	38	+24	0	6
2	Spain	3	2	1	66	50	+16	0	6
3	Argentina	3	2	1	78	71	+7	0	6
4	Uruguay	3	0	3	26	73	–47	1	1

17 April
11:16

Argentina	38–14	Spain

Kai Tak Stadium, Hong Kong

17 April
11:39

South Africa	12–7	Uruguay

Kai Tak Stadium, Hong Kong

17 April
14:23

Argentina	40–19	Uruguay

Kai Tak Stadium, Hong Kong

17 April
14:49

South Africa	12–31	Spain

Kai Tak Stadium, Hong Kong

18 April
10:16

Spain	21–0	Uruguay

Kai Tak Stadium, Hong Kong

18 April
10:39

South Africa	38–0	Argentina

Kai Tak Stadium, Hong Kong

=== Pool B ===
Pos	Team	Pld	W	L	PF	PA	PD	BP	Pts
1	Fiji	3	3	0	92	39	+53	0	9
2	France	3	2	1	81	33	+48	1	7
3	Germany	3	1	2	22	91	–69	0	3
4	Great Britain	3	0	3	31	63	–32	1	1

17 April
12:48

France	22–7	Great Britain

Kai Tak Stadium, Hong Kong

17 April
13:11

Fiji	42–5	Germany

Kai Tak Stadium, Hong Kong

17 April
15:58

France	35–0	Germany

Kai Tak Stadium, Hong Kong

17 April
16:21

Fiji	24–10	Great Britain

Kai Tak Stadium, Hong Kong

18 April
11:50

Great Britain	14–17	Germany

Kai Tak Stadium, Hong Kong

18 April
12:13

Fiji	26–24	France

Kai Tak Stadium, Hong Kong

=== Pool C ===
Pos	Team	Pld	W	L	PF	PA	PD	BP	Pts
1	Australia	3	3	0	64	15	+49	0	9
2	New Zealand	3	2	1	52	36	+16	1	7
3	Kenya	3	1	2	34	52	–18	0	3
4	United States	3	0	3	27	74	–47	2	2

17 April
17:30

New Zealand	19–12	United States

Kai Tak Stadium, Hong Kong

17 April
17:56

Australia	14–5	Kenya

Kai Tak Stadium, Hong Kong

17 April
20:47

New Zealand	28–12	Kenya

Kai Tak Stadium, Hong Kong

17 April
21:10

Australia	38–5	United States

Kai Tak Stadium, Hong Kong

18 April
13:24

United States	10–17	Kenya

Kai Tak Stadium, Hong Kong

18 April
13:47

Australia	12–5	New Zealand

Kai Tak Stadium, Hong Kong

=== Melrose Claymores ===
Points system: Teams were awarded 3 points for a win, 2 points for a draw and 1 point for a loss. No bounus points were awarded.

Key to colours in Melrose Claymores table
Teams that advanced to the Melrose Claymores Final
Teams that are eliminated from the Melrose Claymores tournament

Melrose Claymores table
Pos	Team	Pld	W	D	L	PF	PA	PD	BP	Pts
1	Japan	2	2	0	0	33	7	+26	0	6
2	Hong Kong	2	1	1	0	43	28	+15	1	4
3	China	2	0	0	2	24	55	–31	0	0

17 April
19:38

Hong Kong	36–14	China

Kai Tak Stadium, Hong Kong

18 April
15:16

Hong Kong	7–14	Japan

Kai Tak Stadium, Hong Kong

19 April
10:23

China	0–19	Japan

Kai Tak Stadium, Hong Kong

=== Melrose Claymores Final ===
19 April
16:16

Japan	15–19	Hong Kong

Kai Tak Stadium, Hong Kong

=== 9th to 12th playoffs ===
9th place semifinals
18 April– 16:25 – Kai Tak Stadium
United States	12
Great Britain	17
18 April– 16:48 – Kai Tak Stadium
Germany	12
Uruguay	35

9th place final
19 April– 12:00 – Kai Tak Stadium
Great Britain	14
Uruguay	26
11th place final
19 April– 11:09 – Kai Tak Stadium
United States	15
Germany	19

=== 5th to 8th playoffs ===
Ranking of Cup Quarterfinal Losers
Pos	Team	Original Pool Finish	Pld	PF	PA	PD	Qualification
1	Fiji	1st (Pool B)	4	109	63	+46	Qualified for 5th Place Final
2	Australia	1st (Pool C)	4	69	34	+35	Qualified for 5th Place Final
3	France	2nd (Pool B)	4	91	52	+39	Qualified for 7th Place Final
4	Kenya	3rd (Pool C)	4	56	78	–22	Qualified for 7th Place Final
Ranking criteria notes: Teams are ranked primarily by their original pool stage finish. Fiji and Australia automatically outrank France and Kenya regardless of statistics due to finishing 1st in their pools rather than 2nd or 3rd. France is ranked higher than Kenya regardless of their statistics due to finishing 2nd in their pool and not 3rd; Fiji is ranked ahead of Australia having the highest points difference between the two teams across all 3 pool stage matches and cup quarter-final match (Fiji's +46 vs Australia's +35).

Fifth Place

19 April
15:18

Fiji	26–10	Australia

Kai Tak Stadium, Hong Kong

Seventh Place

19 April
12:51

France	7–21	Kenya

Kai Tak Stadium, Hong Kong

=== Cup ===
Quarterfinals
18 April– 18:03 – Kai Tak Stadium
France	10
New Zealand	19
18 April– 18:28 – Kai Tak Stadium
South Africa	26
Kenya	22
18 April– 20:05 – Kai Tak Stadium
Australia	5
Spain	19
18 April– 20:28 – Kai Tak Stadium
Fiji	17
Argentina	24

Semifinals
19 April– 14:00 – Kai Tak Stadium
New Zealand	14
South Africa	26
19 April– 14:23 – Kai Tak Stadium
Spain	12
Argentina	19

Final
19 April– 18:03 – Kai Tak Stadium
South Africa	35
Argentina	7
Bronze final
19 April– 19:14 – Kai Tak Stadium
New Zealand	28
Spain	32

=== Final placings ===
Place	Team
1st place, gold medalist(s)	South Africa
2nd place, silver medalist(s)	Argentina
3rd place, bronze medalist(s)	Spain
4	New Zealand
5	Fiji
6	Australia
7	Kenya
8	France
9	Uruguay
10	Great Britain
11	Germany
12	United States

== Women's tournament ==
=== Pool stage ===
Points system: Teams were awarded 3 points for a win, 2 points for a draw and 0 points for a loss. For a loss of 7 points or fewer teams were awarded 1 bonus point.

Key to colours in pool tables
Teams that advanced to the cup quarterfinals
Teams that advanced to the 9th place semifinals

=== Pool A ===
Pos	Team	Pld	W	L	PF	PA	PD	BP	Pts
1	New Zealand	3	3	0	105	19	+86	0	9
2	Japan	3	2	1	53	50	+3	0	6
3	Fiji	3	1	2	20	62	–42	1	4
4	Brazil	3	0	3	31	78	–47	1	1

17 April
16:44

Fiji	5–12	Japan

Kai Tak Stadium, Hong Kong

17 April
17:07

New Zealand	29–12	Brazil

Kai Tak Stadium, Hong Kong

17 April
20:01

Fiji	15–12	Brazil

Kai Tak Stadium, Hong Kong

17 April
20:24

New Zealand	38–7	Japan

Kai Tak Stadium, Hong Kong

18 April
12:38

Japan	34–7	Brazil

Kai Tak Stadium, Hong Kong

18 April
13:01

New Zealand	38–0	Fiji

Kai Tak Stadium, Hong Kong

=== Pool B ===
Pos	Team	Pld	W	L	PF	PA	PD	BP	Pts
1	Australia	3	3	0	86	24	+62	0	9
2	Canada	3	2	1	89	26	+63	1	7
3	South Africa	3	1	2	19	69	–50	0	3
4	Great Britain	3	0	3	19	94	–75	0	0

17 April
12:02

Canada	41–7	Great Britain

Kai Tak Stadium, Hong Kong

17 April
12:25

Australia	33–0	South Africa

Kai Tak Stadium, Hong Kong

17 April
15:12

Canada	31–0	South Africa

Kai Tak Stadium, Hong Kong

17 April
15:35

Australia	34–7	Great Britain

Kai Tak Stadium, Hong Kong

18 April
11:04

Great Britain	5–19	South Africa

Kai Tak Stadium, Hong Kong

18 April
11:27

Australia	19–17	Canada

Kai Tak Stadium, Hong Kong

=== Pool C ===
Pos	Team	Pld	W	L	PF	PA	PD	BP	Pts
1	France	3	3	0	79	42	+37	0	9
2	United States	3	2	1	65	31	+34	1	7
3	Spain	3	1	2	38	67	–29	0	3
4	Argentina	3	0	3	31	73	–42	1	1

17 April
10:30

France	29–14	Argentina

Kai Tak Stadium, Hong Kong

17 April
10:53

United States	24–7	Spain

Kai Tak Stadium, Hong Kong

17 April
13:34

France	31–14	Spain

Kai Tak Stadium, Hong Kong

17 April
13:57

United States	27–5	Argentina

Kai Tak Stadium, Hong Kong

18 April
09:30

Argentina	12–17	Spain

Kai Tak Stadium, Hong Kong

18 April
09:53

United States	14–19	France

Kai Tak Stadium, Hong Kong

=== Melrose Claymores ===
Points system: Teams were awarded 3 points for a win, 2 points for a draw and 1 point for a loss. No bounus points were awarded.

Key to colours in Melrose Claymores table
Teams that advanced to the Melrose Claymores Final
Teams that are eliminated from the Melrose Claymores tournament

Melrose Claymores table
Pos	Team	Pld	W	L	L	PF	PA	PD	BP	Pts
1	Thailand	2	2	0	0	38	22	+16	0	6
2	Denmark	2	0	1	1	24	28	–4	3	3
3	Hong Kong	2	0	1	1	26	38	–12	2	2

17 April
18:22

Hong Kong	14–14	Denmark

Kai Tak Stadium, Hong Kong

18 April
14:12

Hong Kong	12–24	Thailand

Kai Tak Stadium, Hong Kong

19 April
10:00

Denmark	10–14	Thailand

Kai Tak Stadium, Hong Kong

=== Melrose Claymores Final ===
19 April
15:47

Thailand	14–17	Denmark

Kai Tak Stadium, Hong Kong

=== 9th to 12th playoffs ===
9th place semifinals
18 April– 15:39 – Kai Tak Stadium
Argentina	17
Brazil	19
18 April– 16:02 – Kai Tak Stadium
South Africa	14
Great Britain	19

9th place final
19 April– 11:32 – Kai Tak Stadium
Brazil	17
Great Britain	12
11th place final
19 April– 10:46 – Kai Tak Stadium
Argentina	25
South Africa	10

=== 5th to 8th playoffs ===
Ranking of Cup Quarterfinal Losers
Pos	Team	Original Pool Finish	Pld	PF	PA	PD	Qualification
1	United States	2nd (Pool B)	4	72	50	+22	Qualified for 5th Place Final
2	Japan	2nd (Pool A)	4	65	72	–7	Qualified for 5th Place Final
3	Spain	3rd (Pool C)	4	43	99	–56	Qualified for 7th Place Final
4	Fiji	3rd (Pool A)	4	25	107	–82	Qualified for 7th Place Final
Ranking criteria notes: Teams are ranked primarily by their original pool stage finish. United States and Japan automatically outrank Spain and Fiji regardless of statistics due to finishing 1st in their pools rather than 2nd.; United States is ranked ahead of Japan for having the highest points difference between the two teams across all 3 pool stage matches and cup quarter-final match (United States's +22 vs Japan's –7).; Spain is ranked ahead of Fiji for having the highest points difference between the two teams across all 3 pool stage matches and cup quarter-final match (Spain's –56 vs Fiji's –82).

Fifth Place

19 April
16:16

United States	24–19	Japan

Kai Tak Stadium, Hong Kong

Seventh Place

19 April
14:49

Fiji	31–12	Spain

Kai Tak Stadium, Hong Kong

=== Cup ===
Quarterfinals
18 April– 17:13 – Kai Tak Stadium
Canada	19
United States	7
18 April– 17:38 – Kai Tak Stadium
New Zealand	32
Spain	5
18 April– 19:19 – Kai Tak Stadium
France	22
Japan	12
18 April– 19:42 – Kai Tak Stadium
Australia	45
Fiji	5

Semifinals
19 April– 13:14 – Kai Tak Stadium
Canada	12
New Zealand	31
19 April– 13:37 – Kai Tak Stadium
France	5
Australia	26

Final
19 April– 18:35 – Kai Tak Stadium
New Zealand	19
Australia	14
Bronze final
19 April– 17:35 – Kai Tak Stadium
Canada	7
France	31

=== Final placings ===
Place	Team
1st place, gold medalist(s)	New Zealand
2nd place, silver medalist(s)	Australia
3rd place, bronze medalist(s)	France
4	Canada
5	United States
6	Japan
7	Fiji
8	Spain
9	Brazil
10	Great Britain
11	Argentina
12	South Africa

2025–26 SVNS
Preceded by 2026 USA Sevens	2026 Hong Kong Sevens	Succeeded by 2026 Spain Sevens
