= South Africa national rugby sevens team =

Rugby union sevens team

South Africa
- Nicknames: Springbok Sevens; Blitzboks; Blitzbokke
- Emblem: Springbok
- Union: South African Rugby Union
- Head coach: Philip Snyman
- Captain: Impi Visser
- Most caps: Branco du Preez (88) (Most Tournament Caps)
- Top scorer: Cecil Afrika (1,430)
- Top try scorer: Seabelo Senatla (224)
First colours	Second colours

Rugby World Cup Sevens
- Appearances: 8 (first in 1993)
- Best result: Runners-up (1997)

The South African national rugby sevens team, commonly known as the Springbok Sevens or Blitzboks, competes in the World Rugby Sevens Series, the Rugby World Cup Sevens, the Summer Olympic Games and the Commonwealth Games. Overall, the team has won the World Rugby Sevens Series 5 times, as well as having won 48 tournaments in the series.

== History ==
After readmission to international sport following the ending of the apartheid ban, the team played their first sevens tournament in the 1993 Hong Kong Sevens, and also participated in the 1993 Rugby World Cup Sevens. They also played in the Hong Kong Sevens for the next two seasons. In 1996, they also took part in the Punta Del Este Sevens in Uruguay and the Dubai Sevens.

They participated in the 1997 Rugby World Cup Sevens the following year as well as in 1998, they played three South American tournaments – the Mar Del Plata Sevens in Argentina, the Punta Del Este Sevens and the Viña del Mar Sevens in Chile. 1999 saw them participate in the Mar Del Plata Sevens, the Santiago Sevens in Chile, the Fiji Sevens, the Hong Kong Sevens, the Japan Sevens and the Paris Sevens.

At the end of 1999, the first World Rugby Sevens Series (then the IRB Sevens World Series) started and the team have been participating in that series ever since. In addition to the Sevens Series, they also played in the Rugby World Cup Sevens, the Commonwealth Games, the World Games and, from 2016 onwards, the Olympic Games.

The team's nickname, "Blitzboks", is derived from "blitz" an Afrikaans word meaning lightning, and the derivative of Springbok ("Bok"), the official emblem of the South African rugby team.

== Kit ==
=== Sponsors on kit ===
Period	Kit manufacturer	Shirt sponsor
1993–1996	Cotton Traders	Lion Lager
1996–2000	Nike	No shirt sponsor
2000–2004	Nike	Castle Lager
2004–2011	Canterbury	SASOL
2011–2014	Canterbury	Absa
2014–2016	Asics	Absa
2016–2018	Asics	Steinhoff
2018–2022	Asics	Castle Free
2022–2023	Asics	WeBuyCars
2023–2025	Nike	WeBuyCars
2025–Present	Nike	FNB

== Tournament history ==
=== Series Record ===
Season	Position
1999–00	5th
2000–01	5th
2001–02	2nd
2002–03	4th
2003–04	5th
2004–05	4th
2005–06	3rd
2006–07	4th
2007–08	2nd
2008–09	1st
2009–10	6th
2010–11	2nd
2011–12	5th
2012–13	2nd
2013–14	2nd
2014–15	2nd
2015–16	2nd
2016–17	1st
2017–18	1st
2018–19	4th
2019–20	2nd
2021	1st
2021–22	2nd
2022–23	7th
2023–24	7th
2024–25	4th
2025–26	1st
Champions	5

=== Grand Final Record ===
Event	Position
2024	6th
2025	1st
2026	1st
Champions	2

=== Series tournament wins ===
South Africa won the following tournaments on the Sevens World Series since its inception in 1999–2000:

48 Tournament wins up to 19 April 2026

Cup wins
Season	Tournament	Final opponent	Score
2001–02	2002 Wellington Sevens	Samoa	17–14
2002–03	2003 Cardiff Sevens	Argentina	35–17
2003–04	2003 Dubai Sevens	New Zealand	33–26
2003–04	2004 Singapore Sevens	Argentina	24–19
2004–05	2005 London Sevens	England	21–12
2005–06	2006 Paris Sevens	Samoa	33–12
2006–07	2006 Dubai Sevens	New Zealand	31–12
2007–08	2008 Adelaide Sevens	New Zealand	15–7
2008–09	2008 Dubai Sevens	England	19–12
2008–09	2008 South Africa Sevens	New Zealand	12–7
2008–09	2009 Adelaide Sevens	Kenya	26–7
2010–11	2011 USA Sevens	Fiji	24–14
2010–11	2011 London Sevens	Fiji	24–14
2010–11	2011 Edinburgh Sevens	Australia	36–35
2012–13	2013 USA Sevens	New Zealand	40–21
2012–13	2013 Japan Sevens	New Zealand	24–19
2012–13	2013 Scotland Sevens	New Zealand	28–21
2013–14	2013 South Africa Sevens	New Zealand	17–14
2013–14	2014 USA Sevens	New Zealand	14–7
2014–15	2014 Dubai Sevens	Australia	33–7
2014–15	2014 South Africa Sevens	New Zealand	26–17
2015–16	2015 South Africa Sevens	Argentina	29–14
2016–17	2016 Dubai Sevens	Fiji	26–14
2016–17	2017 Wellington Sevens	Fiji	26–5
2016–17	2017 Sydney Sevens	England	29–14
2016–17	2017 USA Sevens	Fiji	19–12
2016–17	2017 Paris Sevens	Scotland	15–5
2017–18	2017 Dubai Sevens	New Zealand	24–12
2017–18	2018 Paris Sevens	England	24–14
2018–19	2019 Canada Sevens	France	21–12
2018–19	2019 Singapore Sevens	Fiji	20–19
2019–20	2019 Dubai Sevens	New Zealand	15–0
2019–20	2020 USA Sevens	Fiji	29–24 (a.e.t.)
2021	2021 Vancouver Sevens	Kenya	38–5
2021	2021 Edmonton Sevens	Great Britain	24–12
2021–22	2021 Dubai Sevens Event I	United States	42–7
2021–22	2021 Dubai Sevens Event II	Australia	10–7
2021–22	2022 Málaga Sevens	Argentina	24–17
2021–22	2022 Seville Sevens	Australia	33–7
2022–23	2022 Dubai Sevens	Ireland	21–5
2023–24	2023 Dubai Sevens	Argentina	12–7
2024–25	2024 South Africa Sevens	France	26–14
2024–25	2025 USA Sevens	Spain	19–5
2025–26	2025 South Africa Sevens	Argentina	21–19
2025–26	2026 Australia Sevens	Fiji	21–19
2025–26	2026 Canada Sevens	Spain	38–12
2025–26	2026 USA Sevens	Fiji	10–7
2025–26	2026 Hong Kong Sevens	Argentina	35–7

== Quadrennial tournaments ==
=== Summer Olympics ===
Olympic Games record
Year	Round	Position	Pld	W	L	D
(Brazil) 2016	Bronze medal match	3rd	6	4	2	0
(Japan) 2020	Fifth place match	5th	6	5	1	0
(France) 2024	Bronze medal match	3rd	6	3	3	0
Total	0 Titles	3/3	18	12	6	0

Olympic Games History
2016	Pool stage	South Africa 24 – 0 Spain	Win
2016	Pool stage	South Africa 26 – 0 France	Win
2016	Pool stage	South Africa 5 – 12 Australia	Loss
2016	Quarterfinals	South Africa 22 – 5 Australia	Win
2016	Semifinals	South Africa 7 – 5 Great Britain	Loss
2016	Bronze Medal Match	South Africa 54 – 14 Japan	Win
2020	Pool stage	South Africa 33 – 14 Ireland	Win
2020	Pool stage	South Africa 14 – 5 Kenya	Win
2020	Pool stage	South Africa 17 – 12 United States	Win
2020	Quarterfinals	South Africa 14 – 19 Argentina	Loss
2020	5th Place Semifinals	South Africa 22 – 19 Australia	Win
2020	5th Place Match	South Africa 28 – 7 United States	Win
2024	Pool stage	South Africa 5 – 10 Ireland	Loss
2024	Pool stage	South Africa 5 – 17 New Zealand	Loss
2024	Pool stage	South Africa 49 – 5 Japan	Win
2024	Quarterfinals	South Africa 14 – 7 New Zealand	Win
2024	Semifinals	South Africa 5 – 19 France	Loss
2024	Bronze Medal Match	South Africa 26 – 19 Australia	Win

=== Rugby World Cup Sevens ===
World Cup Sevens record
Year	Round	Position	Played	Won	Lost	Drew
(Scotland) 1993	Quarterfinals	5th	8	6	2	0
(Hong Kong) 1997	Final	2nd	7	6	1	0
(Argentina) 2001	Quarterfinals	5th	6	5	1	0
(Hong Kong) 2005	Quarterfinals	5th	6	4	2	0
(United Arab Emirates) 2009	Quarterfinals	5th	4	3	1	0
(Russia) 2013	Quarterfinals	5th	4	3	1	0
(United States) 2018	Semifinals	3rd	4	3	1	0
(South Africa) 2022	7th place final	7th	4	2	2	0
Total	0 Titles	8/8	43	32	11	0

=== Commonwealth Games ===
Commonwealth Games record
Year	Round	Position	Pld	W	L	D
(Malaysia) 1998	Quarterfinalists	5th	5	4	1	0
(England) 2002	Semifinalists	3rd	6	5	1	0
(Australia) 2006	Plate Finalists	6th	6	3	3	0
(India) 2010	Semifinalists	3rd	6	5	1	0
(Scotland) 2014	Champions	1st	6	6	0	0
(Australia) 2018	Semifinalists	4th	5	3	2	0
(England) 2022	Champions	1st	6	6	0	0
Total	2 Titles		40	32	8	0

Commonwealth Games history
1998	1st Phase	South Africa 29 – 22 Papua New Guinea	Win
1998	1st Phase	South Africa 59 – 0 Trinidad and Tobago	Win
1998	2nd Phase	South Africa 79 – 0 Swaziland	Win
1998	2nd Phase	South Africa 38 – 0 Cook Islands	Win
1998	Quarter-finals	South Africa 5 – 26 Samoa	Loss
2002	Pool stage	South Africa 82 – 0 Sri Lanka	Win
2002	Pool stage	South Africa 19 – 12 Wales	Win
2002	Pool stage	South Africa 26 – 12 Tonga	Win
2002	Quarter-finals	South Africa 17 – 12 Canada	Win
2002	Semi-finals	South Africa 7 – 17 Fiji	Loss
2002	Bronze Medal Match	South Africa 19 – 12 Samoa	Win
2006	Pool stage	South Africa 19 – 26 Tonga	Loss
2006	Pool stage	South Africa 63 – 7 Uganda	Win
2006	Pool stage	South Africa 12 – 10 Samoa	Win
2006	Quarter-finals	South Africa 14 – 20 Australia	Loss
2006	Plate Semi-finals	South Africa 17 – 14 Canada	Win
2006	Plate Final	South Africa 28 – 29 Wales	Loss
2010	Pool stage	South Africa 29 – 0 Tonga	Win
2010	Pool stage	South Africa 59 – 0 India	Win
2010	Pool stage	South Africa 21 – 5 Wales	Win
2010	Quarter-finals	South Africa 10 – 7 Scotland	Win
2010	Semi-Finals	South Africa 7 – 17 Australia	Loss
2010	Bronze Medal Match	South Africa 17 – 14 England	Win
2014	Pool stage	South Africa 36 – 0 Trinidad and Tobago	Win
2014	Pool stage	South Africa 50 – 0 Cook Islands	Win
2014	Pool stage	South Africa 20 – 0 Kenya	Win
2014	Quarter-finals	South Africa 35 – 12 Scotland	Win
2014	Semi-Finals	South Africa 35 – 7 Samoa	Win
2014	Gold Medal Match	South Africa 17 – 12 New Zealand	Win
2018	Pool stage	South Africa 43 – 0 Malaysia	Win
2018	Pool stage	South Africa 52 – 0 Papua New Guinea	Win
2018	Pool stage	South Africa 26 – 5 Scotland	Win
2018	Semi-Finals	South Africa 19 – 24 (a.e.t.) Fiji	Loss
2018	Bronze Medal Match	South Africa 14 – 21 England	Loss
2022	Pool Stage	South Africa 46 – 0 Malaysia	Win
2022	Pool Stage	South Africa 36 – 5 Tonga	Win
2022	Pool Stage	South Africa 34 – 0 Scotland	Win
2022	Quarter-finals	South Africa 33 – 0 Canada	Win
2022	Semi-Finals	South Africa 24 – 12 Australia	Win
2022	Gold Medal Match	South Africa 31 – 7 Fiji	Win

=== World Games ===
Tournament	Placing
2005 Duisburg	2nd (Silver)
2009 Kaohsiung	3rd (Bronze)
2013 Cali	1st (Gold)

== Honours ==
- SVNS Series Champions: 2008–09, 2016–17, 2018–19, 2021, 2025–26
- SVNS Grand Final Winners: 2025, 2026
- Commonwealth Games Gold Medalists: 2014, 2022
- World Games Gold Medalists: 2013

== Players ==
=== Current squad ===
The following players have been selected to represent South Africa during the 2025–26 SVNS tournaments which began on 29 November 2025.

Note: Caps reflect the total number of Rugby Sevens events competed in as of the 2026 France Sevens.

Player	Position	Date of birth (age)	Caps	Club/province
David Brits	Forward	28 April 1997 (age 29)	16	Boland Cavaliers
Zain Davids	Forward	4 May 1997 (age 29)	66	Unattached
Christie Grobbelaar	Forward	25 May 2000 (age 26)	30	Sharks XV
Jayden Nell	Forward	28 October 2004 (age 21)	4	Unattached
Ryan Oosthuizen	Forward	22 May 1995 (age 31)	70	Unattached
Zander Reynders	Forward	19 December 2000 (age 25)	10	Unattached
Siviwe Soyizwapi	Forward	7 December 1992 (age 33)	72	Unattached
Impi Visser (c)	Forward	30 May 1995 (age 31)	58	Unattached
Ronald Brown	Back	2 September 1995 (age 31)	28	Unattached
Selvyn Davids	Back	26 March 1994 (age 32)	56	Unattached
Grant de Jager	Back	7 September 2004 (age 22)	2	Unattached
Donavan Don	Back	18 February 2002 (age 24)	17	Sharks
Ricardo Duarttee	Back	15 March 1998 (age 28)	26	Unattached
Dewald Human	Back	19 May 1995 (age 31)	37	Unattached
Sebastiaan Jobb	Back	20 May 1999 (age 27)	11	Unattached
Tristan Leyds	Back	24 May 1997 (age 29)	22	Unattached
Quewin Nortje	Back	14 January 2003 (age 23)	17	Unattached
Nabo Sokoyi	Back	22 May 2002 (age 24)	3	Unattached
Shilton van Wyk	Back	22 December 1999 (age 26)	38	Unattached
Renaldo Young	Back	12 February 1998 (age 28)	1	Boland Cavaliers

== Records and statistics ==
=== Previous squads ===
The previous South African Sevens squads are as follows:

=== Player records ===
The following tables show the leading career South Africa rugby sevens players. Players in bold are still active.

Tournaments played
No.	Player	Tournaments
1	Branco du Preez	88
2	Kyle Brown	76
3	Chris Dry	74
4	Cecil Afrika	72
5	**Siviwe Soyizwapi**	72

=== Award winners ===
The following South Africa Sevens players have been recognised at the World Rugby Awards since 2004:

World Rugby Men's 7s Rookie of the Year
Year	Nominees	Winners
2014	Seabelo Senatla	—
2015	Ruhan Nel	—
2021	Ronald Brown	—
2023	Ricardo Duarttee	**Ricardo Duarttee**
2024	Quewin Nortje	—

World Rugby Men's 7s Player of the Year
Year	Nominees	Winners
2006	Stefan Basson	—
2008	Fabian Juries	—
2009	Renfred Dazel	—
2011	Cecil Afrika	**Cecil Afrika**
2014	Kyle Brown	—
2015	Werner Kok	**Werner Kok**
2015	Seabelo Senatla	**Werner Kok**
2016	Seabelo Senatla	**Seabelo Senatla**
2017	Rosko Specman	—
2026	Tristan Leyds	**Tristan Leyds**

World Rugby Men's 7s Dream Team
Year	No.	Player
2024	1.	Selvyn Davids
2026	1. 7.	Shilton van Wyk; Tristan Leyds
