= 2025–26 SVNS =

Series of national rugby sevens tournaments

- Men's Series XXVII; Women's Series XIII
- Hosts: United Arab Emirates; South Africa; Singapore; Australia; Canada; United States; Hong Kong (Grand Final); Spain (Grand Final); France (Grand Final)
- Date: 29 November 2025 – 7 June 2026
- Nations: 8

Team changes
- Relegated: Men; Great Britain; Women; Great Britain

The 2025–26 SVNS was the 27th annual series of rugby sevens tournaments for national sevens teams, known as the SVNS. It took place between November 2025 and June 2026. The SVNS has been run by World Rugby since 1999.

== Teams and format ==
The number of teams were reduced from 12 to 8 for both men's and women's. The 4 lowest placed men's and women's teams at the end of the final league event in 2024–25 season were relegated from the series for the 2025–26 season. The men's relegated teams were Kenya, Uruguay, Ireland and USA. The women's relegated teams were Brazil, China, Ireland and Spain.

The tournament takes place over seven months and consists of 9 events, with the final three events making up the World Championship, and consisting of the 8 Division 1 teams, and the top 4 SVNS Division 2 teams.

=== Men's teams ===
- Argentina
- Australia
- Fiji
- France
- Great Britain
- New Zealand
- South Africa
- Spain

=== Women's teams ===
- Australia
- Canada
- Fiji
- France
- Great Britain
- Japan
- New Zealand
- United States

=== Teams from SVNS 2 qualified for Grand Final ===
- Germany (men)
- Kenya (men)
- United States (men)
- Uruguay (men)
- Argentina (women)
- Brazil (women)
- South Africa (women)
- Spain (women)

== Tour venues ==
The schedule for the series was finalised on 1 September 2025.

2025–26 itinerary
Leg	Stadium	City	Dates	Men's Winner	Women's Winner
Dubai	The Sevens Stadium	Dubai	29–30 Nov 2025	New Zealand	New Zealand
South Africa	DHL Stadium	Cape Town	6–7 Dec 2025	South Africa	Australia
Singapore	National Stadium	Singapore	31 Jan–1 Feb 2026	Fiji	New Zealand
Australia	HBF Park	Perth	7–8 Feb 2026	South Africa	New Zealand
Canada	BC Place	Vancouver	7–8 Mar 2026	South Africa	New Zealand
United States	Sports Illustrated	New York (Note: Physical location is Harrison, New Jersey.)	14–15 Mar 2026	South Africa	New Zealand
Hong Kong	Kai Tak Sports Park	Hong Kong	17–19 Apr 2026	South Africa	New Zealand
Spain	José Zorrilla Stadium	Valladolid	29–31 May 2026	Australia	Australia
France	Stade Atlantique	Bordeaux	5–7 Jun 2026	France	Australia

== Standings ==
The points awarded to teams at each event, as well as the overall season totals, are shown in the table below. Gold indicates the event champions. Silver indicates the event runner-ups. Bronze indicates the event third place finishers. An asterisk (*) indicates a tied placing. A dash (—) is recorded where a team did not compete.

=== Men's ===
2025–26 SVNS – Men's Series XXVII
Pos.	Event Team	Dubai	Cape Town	Singapore	Perth	Vancouver	New York	Points total	Points difference
1	South Africa	12	20	14	20	20	20	106	+226
2	Fiji	16	16	20	18	16	18	104	+236
3	Australia	18	8	12	16	14	14	82	–75
4	New Zealand	20	12	16	14	8	10	80	+26
5	France	14	14	18	8	10	12	76	+28
6	Argentina	6	18	8	12	12	16	72	–50
7	Spain	10	6	10	10	18	8	64	–174
8	Great Britain	8	10	6	6	6	6	42	–285

Legend
Gold	Event Champions
Silver	Event Runner-ups
Bronze	Event Third place finishers
No colour	Core team and re-qualified as a core team for the 2026–27 SVNS
Pink	Relegated from core team status for 2026–27 for finishing in the bottom 4 of the Grand Finals

=== Women's ===
2025–26 SVNS – Women's Series XIII
Pos.	Event Team	Dubai	Cape Town	Singapore	Perth	Vancouver	New York	Points total	Points difference
1	New Zealand	20	18	20	20	20	20	118	+622
2	Australia	18	20	18	18	18	18	110	+479
3	United States	12	14	14	14	16	16	86	+47
4	France	8	16	12	16	14	12	78	+31
5	Canada	10	10	16	12	12	8	68	–29
6	Fiji	14	8	10	8	10	14	64	–23
7	Japan	16	12	8	10	8	10	64	–177
8	Great Britain	6	6	6	6	6	6	36	–950

Legend
Gold	Event Champions
Silver	Event Runner-ups
Bronze	Event Third place finishers
No colour	Core team and re-qualified as a core team for the 2026–27 SVNS
Pink	Relegated from core team status for 2026–27 for finishing in the bottom 4 of the Grand Finals

=== Men's Grand Finals ===
2025–26 SVNS – Men's Series XXVII
Pos.	Event Team	Hong Kong	Valladolid	Bordeaux	Points total	Points difference
1st place, gold medalist(s)	South Africa	20	18	14	52	+84
2nd place, silver medalist(s)	New Zealand	14	12	18	44	+16
3rd place, bronze medalist(s)	Spain	16	10	16	42	+17
4	Australia	10	20	8	38	+74
5	Argentina	18	16	4	38	+53
6	Fiji	12	14	10	36	+108
7	France	6	8	20	34	+28
8	United States	1	4	12	17	–66
9	Kenya	8	6	2	16	–52
10	Great Britain	3	1	6	10	–61
11	Germany	2	3	3	8	–66
12	Uruguay	4	2	1	7	–135

Legend
Gold	Event Champions
Silver	Event Runner-ups
Bronze	Event Third place finishers
Green	Qualified for 2026–27 SVNS
No colour	Qualified for 2027 SVNS 2

=== Women's Grand Finals ===
2025–26 SVNS – Women's Series XIII
Pos.	Event Team	Hong Kong	Valladolid	Bordeaux	Points total	Points difference
1st place, gold medalist(s)	Australia	18	20	20	58	+199
2nd place, silver medalist(s)	New Zealand	20	16	18	54	+289
3rd place, bronze medalist(s)	Canada	14	14	16	44	+85
4	United States	12	18	14	44	+53
5	France	16	12	12	40	+94
6	Japan	10	10	8	28	–57
7	Fiji	8	8	10	26	–108
8	Spain	6	6	6	18	–140
9	Brazil	4	3	2	9	–83
10	Argentina	2	2	4	8	–87
11	Great Britain	3	1	3	7	–151
12	South Africa	1	4	1	6	–94

Legend
Gold	Event Champions
Silver	Event Runner-ups
Bronze	Event Third place finishers
Green	Qualified for 2026–27 SVNS
No colour	Qualified for 2027 SVNS 2

== Placings summary ==
Tallies of top-four placings in tournaments during the 2025–26 series, by team:

=== Men ===
Team	(gold) Gold	(silver) Silver	(bronze) Bronze	Fourth	Total
South Africa	5	1		2	8
Fiji	1	2	3	1	7
Australia	1	1	1	2	5
New Zealand	1	1	1	2	5
France	1	1		2	4
Argentina		2	2		4
Spain		1	2		3

=== Women ===
Team	(gold) Gold	(silver) Silver	(bronze) Bronze	Fourth	Total
New Zealand	6	2	1		9
Australia	3	6			9
United States		1	2	4	7
France			3	1	4
Canada			2	2	4
Fiji				2	2
Japan			1		1

== Players ==
Player of the final award
Tour Leg	Men's Winner	Women's Winner	Ref.
Dubai	Brady Rush	Jorja Miller	
Cape Town	Shilton van Wyk	Isabella Nasser	
Singapore	Vuiviawa Naduvalo	Jorja Miller	
Perth	Ryan Oosthuizen	Kelsey Teneti	
Vancouver	Tristan Leyds	Jorja Miller	
New York	Selvyn Davids	Kelsey Teneti	
Hong Kong	Tristan Leyds	Risi Pouri-Lane	
Valladolid	Henry Hutchison	Heldi Dennis	
Bordeaux	Célian Pouzelgues	Maddison Levi	

=== Awards ===
Rookie of the Year Award
Men's Winner	Women's Winner	Ref.
Kele Lasaqa	Anaick Konyi	

Player of the Year Award
Men's Winner	Women's Winner	Ref.
Tristan Leyds	Jorja Miller	

Dream Team
Men's Dream Team	Women's Dream Team	Ref.
Tristan Leyds; Shilton van Wyk; Jeremy Trevithick; Henry Hutchison; Vuiviawa Naduvalo; Terio Veilawa; Luciano González	Jorja Miller; Risi Pouri-Lane; Maddison Levi; Isabella Nasser; Ariana Ramsey (France) Alycia Chrystiaens (Fiji) Reapi Ulunisau	

== Tournaments ==
=== Dubai ===
==== Men's ====
Event	Winner	Score	Finalist
Cup	New Zealand	26–22	Australia
Bronze	Fiji	24–7	France
Fifth Place	South Africa	21–12	Spain
Seventh Place	Great Britain	24–19	Argentina

==== Women's ====
Event	Winner	Score	Finalist
Cup	New Zealand	29–14	Australia
Bronze	Japan	22—12	Fiji
Fifth Place	United States	19–14	Canada
Seventh Place	France	46–5	Great Britain

=== Cape Town ===
==== Men's ====
Event	Winner	Score	Finalist
Cup	South Africa	21–19	Argentina
Bronze	Fiji	26–19	France
Fifth Place	New Zealand	27–12	Great Britain
Seventh Place	Australia	24–12	Spain

==== Women's ====
Event	Winner	Score	Finalist
Cup	Australia	26–12	New Zealand
Bronze	France	15–12	United States
Fifth Place	Japan	12–10	Canada
Seventh Place	Fiji	43–7	Great Britain

=== Singapore ===
==== Men's ====
Event	Winner	Score	Finalist
Cup	Fiji	21–12	France
Bronze	New Zealand	14–12	South Africa
Fifth Place	Australia	26–12	Spain
Seventh Place	Argentina	14–10	Great Britain

==== Women's ====
Event	Winner	Score	Finalist
Cup	Australia	7–36	New Zealand
Bronze	Canada	24–19 (a.e.t.)	United States
Fifth Place	France	17–14	Fiji
Seventh Place	Japan	31–5	Great Britain

=== Perth ===
==== Men's ====
Event	Winner	Score	Finalist
Cup	South Africa	21–19	Fiji
Bronze	Australia	12–10	New Zealand
Fifth Place	Argentina	24–19	Spain
Seventh Place	France	24–17	Great Britain

==== Women's ====
Event	Winner	Score	Finalist
Cup	New Zealand	29–7	Australia
Bronze	France	21–14	United States
Fifth Place	Canada	36–5	Japan
Seventh Place	Fiji	41–5	Great Britain

=== Vancouver ===
==== Men's ====
Event	Winner	Score	Finalist
Cup	South Africa	38–12	Spain
Bronze	Fiji	29–10	Australia
Fifth Place	Argentina	34–15	France
Seventh Place	New Zealand	29–5	Great Britain

==== Women's ====
Event	Winner	Score	Finalist
Cup	New Zealand	24–17	Australia
Bronze	United States	35–21	France
Fifth Place	Canada	26–19	Fiji
Seventh Place	Japan	34–19	Great Britain

=== New York ===
==== Men's ====
Event	Winner	Score	Finalist
Cup	South Africa	10–7	Fiji
Bronze	Argentina	26–10	Australia
Fifth Place	France	21–14	New Zealand
Seventh Place	Spain	24–12	Great Britain

==== Women's ====
Event	Winner	Score	Finalist
Cup	New Zealand	22–21	Australia
Bronze	United States	26–17	Fiji
Fifth Place	France	19–15	Japan
Seventh Place	Canada	22–14	Great Britain

=== Hong Kong ===
==== Men's ====
Event	Winner	Score	Finalist
Cup	South Africa	35–7	Argentina
Bronze	Spain	32–28	New Zealand
Fifth Place	Fiji	26–10	Australia
Seventh Place	Kenya	21–7	France
Ninth Place	Uruguay	26–14	Great Britain
Eleventh Place	Germany	19–15	United States

==== Women's ====
Event	Winner	Score	Finalist
Cup	New Zealand	36–7	Australia
Bronze	France	31–7	Canada
Fifth Place	United States	24–19	Japan
Seventh Place	Fiji	31–12	Spain
Ninth Place	Brazil	17–12	Great Britain
Eleventh Place	Argentina	25–10	South Africa

=== Valladolid ===
==== Men's ====
Event	Winner	Score	Finalist
Cup	Australia	26–19	South Africa
Bronze	Argentina	28–17	Fiji
Fifth Place	New Zealand	22–12	Spain
Seventh Place	France	14–5	Kenya
Ninth Place	United States	28–21	Germany
Eleventh Place	Uruguay	19–17	Great Britain

==== Women's ====
Event	Winner	Score	Finalist
Cup	Australia	27–14	United States
Bronze	New Zealand	50–14	Canada
Fifth Place	France	29–12	Japan
Seventh Place	Fiji	14–5	Spain
Ninth Place	South Africa	19–12	Brazil
Eleventh Place	Argentina	24–19	Great Britain

=== Bordeaux ===
==== Men's ====
Event	Winner	Score	Finalist
Cup	France	14–5	New Zealand
Bronze	Spain	40–14	South Africa
Fifth Place	United States	17–14	Fiji
Seventh Place	Australia	29–0	Great Britain
Ninth Place	Argentina	47–19	Germany
Eleventh Place	Kenya	26–7	Uruguay

==== Women's ====
Event	Winner	Score	Finalist
Cup	Australia	26–19	New Zealand
Bronze	Canada	21–19	United States
Fifth Place	France	24–12	Fiji
Seventh Place	Japan	19–7	Spain
Ninth Place	Argentina	31–19	Great Britain
Eleventh Place	Brazil	24–17	South Africa
