= Jorja Miller =

NZ international rugby union player

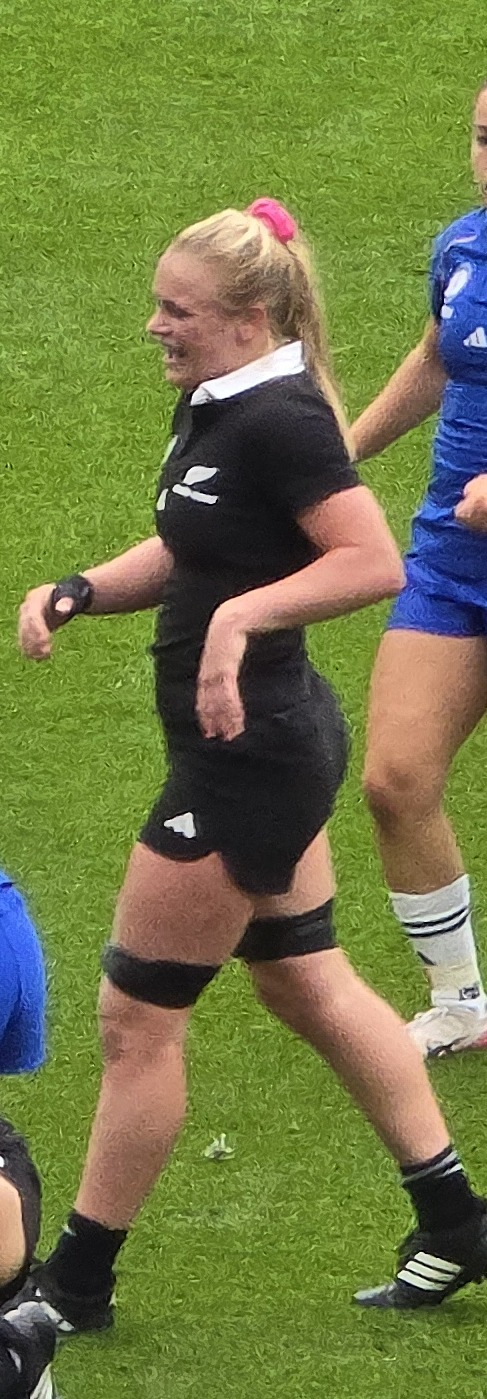
- Miller at the 2025 Women's Rugby World Cup
- Born: 8 February 2004 (age 22) Timaru, New Zealand
- Height: 1.67 m (5 ft 6 in)
- Weight: 71 kg (157 lb)

Rugby union career
- Position: open-side flanker
Youth career
- -: Timaru Harlequins
- –: Timaru Girls'
- –: Christchurch Girls'
International career
Years	Team	Apps	(Points)
2025–	New Zealand	7	(25)
National sevens team
Years	Team		Comps
2022-	New Zealand 7s		118 apps 76 tries 380 points
Medal record
Women's rugby sevens
Representing New Zealand
Olympic Games
Gold medal – first place	2024 Paris	Team competition
Rugby World Cup Sevens
Silver medal – second place	2022 Cape Town	Team competition
Women's rugby union
Representing New Zealand
World Cup
Bronze medal – third place	2025 England	Team competition

Jorja Miller (born 8 February 2004) is a New Zealand rugby union player. She plays fifteen-a-side and seven-a-side rugby union, and is a member of the New Zealand Women's Sevens team. Miller was a member of the New Zealand Women's Sevens team that won the gold medal at the 2024 Summer Olympics in Paris.

== Early life ==
Miller was born on 8 February 2004 in Timaru to Tracey and Craig Miller. She has two older brothers, Corin and Deon. Her grandfather and father played for Timaru-based Harlequins seniors rugby team (her father playing more than 200 games) while her mother was a member of the South Canterbury women's team.

Following in the footsteps of her great-grandmother, grandmother and mother, Miller began highland dancing at the age of four. She eventually went on to become an age-group national champion in her favourite dance, Sailor's Hornpipe. In 2021 she participated in the under 18 national championships.

Miller also played basketball for a period.

Miller initially attended Timaru Girls' High School before moving to Christchurch Girls' High School as a boarder in 2019 in the hope that by playing girls' club rugby with the High School Old Boys Club she would more consistently be participating in a higher level of play and also gain exposure that could result in her being selected for the Black Ferns Sevens team.

== Rugby career ==
She began playing rugby at the age of four with her brother in a Timaru Harlequins Rugby Football Club boys’ team. In 2015 she was captain of the Timaru Harlequins Rugby Football Club's under 12 team and was one of only two girls to make the South Island under 48 kg side. In 2016 she was once again captain of the Harlequins team and was a member of the under 65 kg South Island team.

She was a member of every South Canterbury age group rugby team until at the age of 13 she became ineligible to play mixed rugby and switched from playing for Harlequins to playing only for Timaru Girls' High School team and regional girls teams.

In 2017 Miller played for Timaru Girl's High School in the fifteen-a-side Aoraki secondary schoolgirls competition. The team lost 60–42 to a combined Mt Hutt-Ashburton college in the final despite Miller scoring three tries.

Alongside the Te Moananui triplets, Miller (who by now had acquired the nickname "Scooter") was a member of the Hanan Shield secondary schoolgirls rugby team which competed at the South Island secondary schoolgirls rugby tournament at Christchurch in 2017. The youngest player at the event she was named the most valuable player and captain of the tournament team.

Until she moved to Christchurch Miller mainly played the fifteen-a-side rugby as an open-side flanker with only occasional games of sevens, such as a game in 2018 for South Canterbury against Mid-Canterbury at a girl's under-15 sevens tournament.

Despite not being Dutch she toured Europe in 2018 with a New Zealand Dutch under-18 girls Invitational New Zealand Dutch Barbarians Sevens team. Five of the 11 members in the team had never played sevens rugby before. In the six months prior to their departure Miller had to make monthly trips north to Whangarei to attend team training. As the Barbarian's schedule clashed she was unable to be a member of the Aoraki team (formerly the Hanan Shield team) that competed in the that years South Island secondary schoolgirls rugby tournament. The Barbarian's first games were in London against the Cobham Rugby Club which they won 60–0, 40–0 and 32–0 despite some of the New Zealanders playing for Cobham in the final game of the series. They then attended the Amsterdam International Quadrangular under-18 girls' tournament in the Netherlands they played against the Nemos, who were the Dutch club champions and the national U18 teams of Sweden and the Netherlands. The team won all their group games on the first day in Amstelveen, before at the second date of competition at the National Rugby Centre in Amsterdam beating Holland 26–17 and the Nemos 47–0 in the semi-finals despite losing two members of the team to injuries. They then beat Holland in the final, 26–10.

=== Condor competition ===
In 2019 she was a member of the Christchurch Girl's High team that won the National Condor Sevens title. In the semi-final against reigning championships Hamilton Girls’ High School Miller after earlier being sin-binned scored the winning try in extra time following an 80 metres sprint to the line. In the final she scored four tries in her team's 29–14 win over Howick College from Auckland.

While the Christchurch Girl's High team only came fifth at the 2020 National Condors Girls Tournament, Miller was selected for the 2020 Condor New Zealand Secondary School Girls team. Playing against NZ Barbarians, Niue Fiti Poua, Cook Islands, New Zealand Maori, New Zealand Cavaliers and New Zealand Fijians the team won of their games.

By 2019 Miller had come to the conclusion that she preferred to play the more open style of sevens over the fifteen-a-side game. It was about this time that she was noticed by the Black Ferns Sevens coaching team.

In 2021, Miller was called to attend a High Performance Development Camp.

=== Farah Palmer Cup ===
She played for Canterbury in the Farah Palmer Cup competition but her participation was curtailed in October 2021 when in the team's semi-final 72–24 win over Otago in which she scored two tries, she damaged a knee cartridge. She was able with the assistance of anti-inflammatories to play in the final against Waikato. The injury required two surgeries, the second after the first was unsuccessful. As a result of this injury she missed out on selection for the 2022 Commonwealth Games in Birmingham.

=== Black Ferns sevens ===
Miller signed a contract to join the Black Ferns Sevens squad in 2022. She made her debut as a member of the Rugby World Cup Sevens squad that won a silver medal in Cape Town. Miller was a member of the Black Ferns Sevens team that competed in the 2022–23 World Rugby Women's Sevens Series. She played in all of the season's games and was named in four separate tournament dream teams, named player of the final at the Sydney tournament and at the end of the season was named Rookie of the Year by World Rugby.

In November 2023 Miller signed a four-year contract with New Zealand Rugby which committed her to playing for the New Zealand Women Sevens team through to 2027. At the time it was the longest contract signed by a New Zealand rugby woman player.

=== 2024 Paris Olympics ===
On 20 June 2024 it was announced that she had been selected as a member of the New Zealand Women's Rugby Sevens team for the Paris Olympics. Miller scored three tries over the course of the Olympic sevens competition and won a gold medal after the New Zealand team triumphed against Canada in the final, 19–12. She was New Zealand's youngest female gold medallist at the Paris Olympics.

=== Black Ferns fifteens ===
Miller made her international debut for the Black Ferns in their 79–14 win over the USA Eagles in the Pacific Four Series on 24 May 2025.

In July 2025, she was named in the Black Ferns side to the Women's Rugby World Cup in England. Miller made six appearances at the World Cup, scoring a total of four tries, two of which were against Spain and the other two against Japan.

=== Return to sevens ===
Following the completion of her duties with the fifteen-a-side team Miller returned to compete in the sevens team in the 2025-26 sevens series.

The game against Japan in pool play at the Vancouver tournament held on 7–8 March 2026 Miller score her 100th sevens try. It had taken her 27 tournaments, putting her third in New Zealand rankings behind Porta Woodman and Michaela Brake who had both taken 15 tournament to reach the same milestone. In the final of the same tournament Miller scored a try which bought her total number of tries in Sevens finals to 17, behind Michaela Blyde (38), Portia Woodman (34), Maddison Levi (18) and ahead of Stacey Waaka (14).

After scoring four tries in pool play at the New York tournament held on 14–15 March 2026 Miller joined Blyde, Woodman and Waaka as the only New Zealand Sevens players to have scored 30-plus tries in a season.

== Awards and honours ==
In 2020, Miller was named as the most valuable player at the New Zealand Condors School Sevens tournament.

In 2021 Miller was named a Young Sportsperson of the Year at the Trust Aoraki South Canterbury Sports Awards. In that same year she was nominated for the Lincoln University Outstanding Young Sportswoman of the Year at the Orix New Zealand Sport Canterbury Awards.

At the 2024 Rugby Awards Miller was honoured with the Kelvin R. Tremain Memorial Player of the Year award. In the 30-year history of the award the 20 year old Miller was the second-youngest recipient of the award behind Jonah Lomu. The only other women to have won the award up until this time have been Kendra Cocksedge and Sarah Hirini.

At the end of the 2024-2025 Sevens series she was named HSBC Women's Sevens Player of the Year. She would go on to repeat as Player of the Year in 2025-2026, joining Michalea Brake (nee Blyde) and Charlotte Caslick as the only other players to win the award twice.
