= 2026 USA Sevens =

World Rugby Sevens Series tournaments

- 2025–26 SVNS
- Host nation: United States
- Date: 14–15 March 2026

Men
- Champion: South Africa
- Runner-up: Fiji
- Third: Argentina

Women
- Champion: New Zealand
- Runner-up: Australia
- Third: United States

Tournament details
- Matches played: 40

The 2026 USA Sevens or SVNS NYC was a rugby sevens tournament branded as SVNS New York took place at Sports Illustrated Stadium in Harrison. Eight men's teams and eight women's teams participated.

== Attendance ==
The reported attendance for the weekend event produced by TEG Rugby and World Rugby was 12,550. The attendance for Saturday, March 14, 2026 by Sports Illustrated Stadium was 6,505. The reported attendance for Sunday, March 15, 2026 by Sports Illustrated Stadium was 6,045.

== Men's tournament ==
=== Pool stage ===
Points system: Teams were awarded 3 points for a win, 2 points for a draw and 0 points for a loss. For a loss of 7 points or fewer teams were awarded 1 bonus point.

Key to colours in pool tables
Teams that advanced to the Cup semifinals
Teams that advanced to the 5th place semifinals

=== Pool A ===
Pos	Team	Pld	W	L	PF	PA	PD	BP	Pts
1	Australia	3	3	0	55	19	+36	0	9
2	South Africa	3	2	1	46	31	+15	1	7
3	New Zealand	3	1	2	40	58	–18	1	4
4	France	3	0	3	29	62	–33	2	2

14 March
10:44

Australia	24–0	France

Sports Illustrated Stadium, Harrison

14 March
11:06

South Africa	22–7	New Zealand

Sports Illustrated Stadium, Harrison

14 March
13:40

Australia	12–7	New Zealand

Sports Illustrated Stadium, Harrison

14 March
14:02

South Africa	12–5	France

Sports Illustrated Stadium, Harrison

14 March
16:36

France	24–26	New Zealand

Sports Illustrated Stadium, Harrison

14 March
16:58

South Africa	12–19	Australia

Sports Illustrated Stadium, Harrison

=== Pool B ===
Pos	Team	Pld	W	L	PF	PA	PD	BP	Pts
1	Argentina	3	2	1	72	57	+15	1	7
2	Fiji	3	2	1	79	62	+17	0	6
3	Spain	3	1	2	62	84	–22	1	4
4	Great Britain	3	0	3	52	62	–10	1	4

14 March
10:00

Fiji	12–31	Argentina

Sports Illustrated Stadium, Harrison

14 March
10:22

Spain	24–14	Great Britain

Sports Illustrated Stadium, Harrison

14 March
12:56

Fiji	24–19	Great Britain

Sports Illustrated Stadium, Harrison

14 March
13:18

Spain	26–27	Argentina

Sports Illustrated Stadium, Harrison

14 March
15:52

Argentina	14–19	Great Britain

Sports Illustrated Stadium, Harrison

14 March
16:14

Spain	12–43	Fiji

Sports Illustrated Stadium, Harrison

=== 5th to 8th playoffs ===
5th place semifinals
15 March– 11:00 – Sports Illustrated Stadium
New Zealand	31
Great Britain	24
15 March– 11:22 – Sports Illustrated Stadium
Spain	5
France	36

5th place final
15 March– 15:00 – Sports Illustrated Stadium
New Zealand	14
France	21
7th place final
15 March– 14:06 – Sports Illustrated Stadium
Great Britain	12
Spain	24

=== Cup ===
Semifinals
15 March– 12:28 – Sports Illustrated Stadium
Australia	7
Fiji	28
15 March– 12:50 – Sports Illustrated Stadium
Argentina	5
South Africa	14

Final
15 March– 16:41 – Sports Illustrated Stadium
Fiji	7
South Africa	10
Bronze final
15 March– 15:54 – Sports Illustrated Stadium
Australia	10
Argentina	26

=== Final placings ===
Place	Team
1st place, gold medalist(s)	South Africa
2nd place, silver medalist(s)	Fiji
3rd place, bronze medalist(s)	Argentina
4	Australia
5	France
6	New Zealand
7	Spain
8	Great Britain

=== Dream Team ===
Forwards	Backs
(South Africa) Impi Visser (Fiji) Vuiviawa Naduvalo (Argentina) Matteo Graziano	(Fiji) Terio Veilawa (Australia) Wallace Charlie (South Africa) Selvyn Davids; Tristan Leyds

== Women's tournament ==
=== Pool stage ===
Points system: Teams were awarded 3 points for a win, 2 points for a draw and 0 points for a loss. For a loss of 7 points or fewer teams were awarded 1 bonus point.

Key to colours in pool tables
Teams that advanced to the Cup semifinals
Teams that advanced to the 5th place semifinals

=== Pool A ===
Pos	Team	Pld	W	L	PF	PA	PD	BP	Pts
1	New Zealand	3	3	0	106	34	+72	0	9
2	Fiji	3	2	1	68	60	+8	0	6
3	France	3	1	2	67	70	–3	1	4
4	Great Britain	3	0	3	36	113	–77	0	0

14 March
11:28

France	17–22	Fiji

Sports Illustrated Stadium, Harrison

14 March
11:50

New Zealand	46–5	Great Britain

Sports Illustrated Stadium, Harrison

14 March
14:24

France	31–19	Great Britain

Sports Illustrated Stadium, Harrison

14 March
14:46

New Zealand	31–10	Fiji

Sports Illustrated Stadium, Harrison

14 March
17:20

Fiji	36–12	Great Britain

Sports Illustrated Stadium, Harrison

14 March
17:52

New Zealand	29–19	France

Sports Illustrated Stadium, Harrison

=== Pool B ===
Pos	Team	Pld	W	L	PF	PA	PD	BP	Pts
1	Australia	3	3	0	113	26	+87	0	9
2	United States	3	2	1	90	26	+64	1	7
3	Japan	3	1	2	38	113	–75	0	3
4	Canada	3	0	3	19	95	–76	0	0

14 March
12:12

Australia	47–7	Japan

Sports Illustrated Stadium, Harrison

14 March
12:34

United States	24–0	Canada

Sports Illustrated Stadium, Harrison

14 March
15:08

Australia	40–0	Canada

Sports Illustrated Stadium, Harrison

14 March
15:30

United States	47–0	Japan

Sports Illustrated Stadium, Harrison

14 March
18:04

Canada	19–31	Japan

Sports Illustrated Stadium, Harrison

14 March
18:26

Australia	26–19	United States

Sports Illustrated Stadium, Harrison

=== 5th to 8th playoffs ===
5th place semifinals
15 March– 11:44 – Sports Illustrated Stadium
France	24
Canada	19
15 March– 11:22 – Sports Illustrated Stadium
Japan	31
Great Britain	14

5th place final
15 March– 15:22 – Sports Illustrated Stadium
France	19
Japan	15
7th place final
15 March– 14:28 – Sports Illustrated Stadium
Canada	22
Great Britain	14

=== Cup ===
Semifinals
15 March– 12:28 – Sports Illustrated Stadium
New Zealand	26
United States	14
15 March– 12:50 – Sports Illustrated Stadium
Australia	22
Fiji	14

Final
15 March– 17:14 – Sports Illustrated Stadium
New Zealand	22
Australia	21
Bronze final
15 March– 16:16 – Sports Illustrated Stadium
United States	26
Fiji	17

=== Final placings ===
Place	Team
1st place, gold medalist(s)	New Zealand
2nd place, silver medalist(s)	Australia
3rd place, bronze medalist(s)	United States
4	Fiji
5	France
6	Japan
7	Canada
8	Great Britain

=== Dream Team ===
Forwards	Backs
(New Zealand) Jorja Miller (Australia) Maddison Levi (New Zealand) Kelsey Teneti	(New Zealand) Risi Pouri-Lane (United States) Kaylen Thomas (Fiji) Reapi Ulunisau; Teagan Levi

2025–26 SVNS
Preceded by 2026 Canada Sevens	2026 Canada Sevens	Succeeded by 2026 Hong Kong Sevens
