= 2023–24 SVNS squads =

International rugby sevens

SVNS 2023–24 squads

This is a list of the complete squads for the 2023–24 SVNS.

Legend
Gold	Indicates the captains for a tournament
–	Indicates that a player did not play in the tournament

== Argentina ==
Men's Head Coach: (Argentina) Santiago Gómez Cora

Women's Head Coach: (Argentina) Nahuel Garcia

Argentina men's team members 2023–24
Player	Jersey number by tournament							
Player	Dubai	Cape Town	Perth	Vancouver	Los Angeles	Hong Kong	Singapore	Madrid
Agustin Fraga	5	5	5	5	5	5	5	5
Santiago Mare	12	12	12	12	12	12	12	12
Alejo Lavayen	7	–	–	–	–	–	–	–
Luciano González	11	11	11	11	11	11	11	11
Matteo Graziano	4	4	4	4	4	4	4	4
Germán Schulz	3	3	3	3	3	3	3	3
Marcos Moneta	13	13	13	13	13	13	–	–
Joaquín Pellandini	14	14	14	14	14	14	14	14
Matías Osadczuk	9	9	9	9	9	9	9	–
Santiago Álvarez	6	6	6	6	6	–	6	6
Tobias Wade	10	10	10	10	10	10	10	10
Gastón Revol	8	8	8	8	8	8	8	8
Tomas Elizalde	22	22	22	22	–	–	22	22
Santiago Vera Feld	–	2	–	–	2	2	2	2
Rodrigo Isgró	–	–	1	1	1	1	1	1
Alfonso Latorre	–	–	–	–	–	23	–	–
Facundo Pueyrredon	–	–	–	–	–	–	–	21

Argentina women's team members 2023–24
Player	Jersey number by tournament
Player	Madrid
Sofia Gonzalez	10
Candela Delgado	8
Mayra Genghini	16
Micaela Pallero	12
Josefina Padellaro	18
Antonella Reding	2
Marianela Escalante	21
Azul Medina	6
Gimena Mattus	1
Maria Brigido Chamorro	9
Talìa Rodich	13
María Taladrid	3
Brisa Trisgo	5

== Australia ==
Men's Head Coach: (Australia) John Manenti
Women's Head Coach: (Australia) Tim Walsh

Australia men's team members 2023–24
Player	Jersey number by tournament							
Player	Dubai	Cape Town	Perth	Vancouver	Los Angeles	Hong Kong	Singapore	Madrid
Ben Dowling	2	2	2	2	2	2	2	2
Tim Clements	5	5	5	5	5	–	–	5
Matt Gonzalez	9	–	9	9	9	9	–	9
Josh Turner	7	7	7	7	7	–	–	7
Dally Bird	8	8	–	–	–	–	–	8
Nick Malouf	10	10	10	10	10	10	10	10
Maurice Longbottom	11	11	11	–	–	11	–	–
Nathan Lawson	12	12	12	12	12	12	12	12
Ben Dalton	13	13	–	–	–	–	–	–
Hayden Sargeant	25	25	25	25	25	25	25	25
James Turner	14	14	14	14	14	14	14	14
Henry Palmer	3	3	3	3	3	3	3	–
Dietrich Roache	4	4	4	4	4	4	4	4
James McGregor	–	15	–	–	–	–	15	–
Henry Hutchison	–	–	1	1	1	1	1	1
Darby Lancaster	–	–	23	–	–	–	–	–
Michael Icely	–	–	–	87	87	87	87	87
Henry Paterson	–	–	–	6	6	6	6	6
Michael Hooper	–	–	–	–	–	77	77	–
Teddy Wilson	–	–	–	–	–	–	30	–

Australia women's team members 2023–24
Player	Jersey number by tournament							
Player	Dubai	Cape Town	Perth	Vancouver	Los Angeles	Hong Kong	Singapore	Madrid
Maddison Levi	12	12	12	12	12	12	12	12
Demi Hayes	11	11	–	–	–	–	–	–
Dominique du Toit	4	4	4	4	4	–	4	4
Kaitlin Shave	8	8	8	8	8	8	8	8
Faith Nathan	3	3	3	3	3	3	3	3
Sariah Paki	65	65	65	65	65	65	65	65
Sharni Smale	2	2	2	2	2	2	–	–
Alysia Lefau-Fakaosilea	55	55	55	–	–	–	–	–
Madison Ashby	6	6	6	6	6	6	6	–
Bienne Terita	22	22	22	–	–	22	–	22
Teagan Levi	5	5	5	5	5	5	5	5
Charlotte Caslick	7	7	7	7	7	7	–	7
Isabella Nasser	10	10	10	10	10	10	10	10
Heidi Dennis	–	–	13	–	–	–	–	–
Sidney Taylor	–	–	–	98	98	–	98	98
Lily Dick	–	–	–	1	1	–	1	–
Tia Hinds	–	–	–	9	9	9	9	9
Bridget Clark	–	–	–	–	–	14	14	14
Ruby Nicholas	–	–	–	–	–	23	23	23

== Belgium ==
Women's Head Coach: (Belgium) Emiel Vermote

Belgium women's team members 2023–24
Player	Jersey number by tournament
Player	Madrid
Cecile Blondiau	4
Shari Claes	8
Femke Soens	7
Hanne Swiers	9
Ambre Collet	16
Margaux Stevins	2
Nele Pien	5
Emilie Musch	3
Pauline Gernaey	6
Louka Blommaert	15
Margaux Lalli	1
Noemie van der Poele	10

== Brazil ==
Women's Head Coach: (England) Will Broderick

Brazil women's team members 2023–24
Player	Jersey number by tournament							
Player	Dubai	Cape Town	Perth	Vancouver	Los Angeles	Hong Kong	Singapore	Madrid
Luiza Campos	2	2	2	2	2	2	2	2
Gabriela Lima	9	9	9	9	9	9	9	9
Andressa Alves	21	21	–	–	–	–	–	–
Marina Fioravanti	8	8	8	8	8	8	8	8
Mariana Nicolau	1	1	1	1	1	–	–	1
Gisele Gomes	18	18	18	–	–	18	18	–
Bianca Silva	11	11	11	11	11	11	11	11
Milena Mariano	31	31	–	–	–	31	31	31
Thalia Costa	5	5	5	5	5	5	5	5
Aline Furtado	7	7	7	7	7	7	7	–
Rafaela Zanellato	3	3	3	3	3	3	–	–
Thalita Costa	13	13	13	13	13	13	13	13
Yasmim Soares	22	22	22	22	22	22	22	22
Raquel Kochhann	–	–	10	10	10	10	–	10
Isadora Lopes de Souza	–	–	6	–	–	–	–	6
Leila dos Santos Silva	–	–	–	4	4	–	4	4
Camilla Carvalho	–	–	–	77	77	77	77	–
Marcelle Souza	–	–	–	–	–	–	12	12

== Canada ==
Men's Head Coach: (Canada) Sean White
Women's Head Coach: (Republic of Ireland) Jack Hanratty

Canada men's team members 2023–24
Player	Jersey number by tournament							
Player	Dubai	Cape Town	Perth	Vancouver	Los Angeles	Hong Kong	Singapore	Madrid
Jack Carson	99	99	99	99	99	–	–	99
Matthew Oworu	19	19	19	–	–	–	19	19
Thomas Isherwood	23	23	23	23	23	–	23	23
Josiah Morra	6	6	6	6	6	6	6	6
Phil Berna	4	4	4	4	–	4	4	4
Alex Russell	5	–	–	5	5	5	5	–
Kalin Sager	33	33	33	33	33	33	33	33
Cooper Coats	8	8	8	–	–	–	–	8
Max Stewart	21	21	–	21	21	–	–	–
David Richard	12	12	12	12	–	–	12	12
Jake Thiel	2	2	2	–	–	–	–	–
Cody Nhanala	59	59	59	59	59	59	–	59
Lockie Kratz	44	44	44	–	–	–	–	–
Matthew Percillier	–	88	88	88	88	88	–	88
Ethan Hager	–	–	15	15	15	15	–	–
Noah Flesch	–	–	–	77	77	–	77	77
Elias Hancock	–	–	–	64	64	64	64	64
Liam Bowman	–	–	–	–	27	–	27	27
Kobe Faust	–	–	–	–	24	24	–	–
Jack McCarthy	–	–	–	–	–	13	–	–
D'Shawn Bowen	–	–	–	–	–	14	–	–
Jesse Kilgour	–	–	–	–	–	17	–	–
Morgan Di Nardo	–	–	–	–	–	18	–	–
Brock Webster	–	–	–	–	–	–	7	–
Henry Kirwan	–	–	–	–	–	–	28	–
Ethan Turner	–	–	–	–	–	–	3	–

Canada women's team members 2023–24
Player	Jersey number by tournament							
Player	Dubai	Cape Town	Perth	Vancouver	Los Angeles	Hong Kong	Singapore	Madrid
Piper Logan	11	11	–	11	11	11	11	11
Florence Symonds	7	7	7	7	–	–	–	7
Olivia De Couvreur	1	1	–	–	–	–	1	–
Olivia Apps	21	21	21	21	21	21	–	21
Charity Williams	6	6	6	6	–	6	6	6
Asia Hogan-Rochester	24	24	24	24	24	–	–	24
Krissy Scurfield	13	13	13	13	13	13	13	–
Fancy Bermudez	10	10	10	10	10	10	–	10
Shalaya Valenzuela	23	23	23	–	–	23	23	23
Caroline Crossley	35	35	35	35	–	–	–	35
Alysha Corrigan	16	16	16	16	16	16	16	16
Chloe Daniels	77	77	77	77	77	77	77	77
Carissa Norsten	19	19	19	19	19	19	19	–
Breanne Nicholas	–	–	4	4	4	–	4	–
Maddy Grant	–	–	9	–	9	–	–	9
Sophie de Goede	–	–	–	15	15	15	–	–
Sabrina Poulin	–	–	–	–	22	22	–	–
Taylor Perry	–	–	–	–	40	–	40	40
Julia Greenshields	–	–	–	–	–	5	5	–
Pamphinette Buisa	–	–	–	–	–	99	–	–
Keyara Wardley	–	–	–	–	–	–	12	12
Eden Kilgour	–	–	–	–	–	–	14	–

== Chile ==
Men's Head Coach: (Argentina) Joaquin Todeschini

Chile men's team members 2023–24
Player	Jersey number by tournament
Player	Madrid
Ernesto Tchimino	8
Lucca Avelli	7
Tomas Salas	12
Gonzalo Lara	3
Diego Warnken	10
Nicolas Saab	35
Inaki Tuset	16
Cristobal Game	6
Benjamin Videla	4
Nicolás Garafulic	11
Luca Strabucchi	2
Clemente Armstrong	1
Francisco Urroz	9

== China ==
Women's Head Coach: (China) Lu Zhuan

China women's team members 2023–24
Player	Jersey number by tournament
Player	Madrid
Gu Yaoyao	5
Sun Yue	16
Chen Keyi	7
Liu Xiaoqian	11
Su Qi	18
Hu Yu	12
Yan Meiling	2
Ruan Hongting	1
Yang Feifei	9
Xu Xiaoyan	4
Ma Xiaodan	28
Zhou Yan	20
Dou Xinrong	15

== Fiji ==
Men's Head Coach: (England) Ben Gollings (until Los Angeles), (Fiji) Osea Kolinisau (from Hong Kong)
Women's Head Coach: (Fiji) Saiasi Fuli

Fiji men's team members 2023–24
Player	Jersey number by tournament							
Player	Dubai	Cape Town	Perth	Vancouver	Los Angeles	Hong Kong	Singapore	Madrid
Joseva Talacolo	2	2	2	2	2	2	2	–
Pilipo Bukayaro	9	9	9	9	9	–	9	–
Netava Koroisau	23	23	–	–	–	–	–	–
Kavekini Tabu	94	–	–	–	–	–	–	–
Sevuloni Mocenacagi	4	4	4	4	4	–	4	4
Ilikimi Vunaki	6	6	–	–	–	–	–	6
Jermaia Matana	3	3	3	3	3	3	–	3
Terio Veilawa	96	96	96	96	96	–	96	96
Viwa Naduvalo	12	12	12	–	–	12	–	12
Rubeni Kabu	70	70	–	–	–	–	70	–
Kaminieli Rasaku	11	11	11	11	–	–	11	–
Filipe Sauturaga	7	7	–	–	7	7	7	–
Manueli Maisamoa	21	21	–	–	–	21	21	–
Josese Batirerega	–	99	99	99	99	99	–	–
Rere Ropate	–	–	22	22	22	–	–	–
Ponepati Loganimasi	–	–	18	18	18	18	18	18
Suli Volivolituevei	–	–	89	–	–	89	–	89
Waisea Nacuqu	–	–	8	–	–	8	–	8
Josua Vakurunabili	–	–	1	–	–	–	–	–
Viliame Naikausa	–	–	–	45	45	45	45	45
Solomani Rauqe	–	–	–	24	24	–	–	–
Napolioni Bolaca	–	–	–	88	88	88	–	–
Rauto Vakadanu	–	–	–	29	29	–	–	–
Joji Nasova	–	–	–	–	–	13	13	13
Vatemo Ravouvou	–	–	–	–	–	47	47	–
Iowane Teba	–	–	–	–	–	–	10	10
Jerry Tuwai	–	–	–	–	–	–	–	30
Tira Wilagi	–	–	–	–	–	–	–	5

Fiji women's team members 2023–24
Player	Jersey number by tournament							
Player	Dubai	Cape Town	Perth	Vancouver	Los Angeles	Hong Kong	Singapore	Madrid
Younis Bese	11	11	11	–	–	11	11	11
Alowesi Nakoci	10	10	10	10	10	10	–	–
Ana Naimasi	8	8	8	8	8	8	8	8
Adi Vani Buleki	3	3	3	3	3	3	3	3
Rogosau Adimereani	18	18	–	–	–	–	–	–
Ilisapeci Delaiwau	14	14	14	14	14	14	14	14
Reapi Ulunisau	6	6	6	6	–	–	–	6
Lavena Cavuru	7	7	7	7	7	7	7	7
Viniana Riwai	15	15	15	–	–	–	–	–
Laisana Moceisawana	12	12	–	–	–	–	12	12
Raijieli Daveua	5	5	5	5	5	5	5	–
Maria Rokotuisiga	9	9	–	9	9	–	–	–
Talei Wilson	1	1	1	1	1	1	1	1
Elenoa Adi Naimata	–	–	19	–	–	19	–	–
Verenaisi Ditavutu	–	–	13	20	20	20	20	20
Meredani Qoro	–	–	16	16	16	16	16	–
Heleina Young	–	–	–	21	21	21	–	–
Laisana Likuceva	–	–	–	24	24	24	24	24
Mere Navue	–	–	–	–	–	–	25	25
Mereula Torooti	–	–	–	–	–	–	23	23
Kolora Lomani	–	–	–	–	–	–	–	26

== France ==
Men's Head Coach: (France) Jérôme Daret
Women's Head Coach: (France) David Courteix

France men's team members 2023–24
Player	Jersey number by tournament							
Player	Dubai	Cape Town	Perth	Vancouver	Los Angeles	Hong Kong	Singapore	Madrid
Varian Pasquet	19	19	19	19	19	19	–	19
Antoine Zeghdar	8	8	8	8	8	8	–	–
Aaron Grandidier	9	9	9	9	9	9	9	9
Paulin Riva	6	6	6	6	6	6	–	6
Théo Forner	20	–	20	20	20	–	–	20
Rayan Rebbadj	26	26	–	26	26	26	26	26
William Iraguha	91	91	91	91	91	–	–	–
Stephen Parez	5	5	5	5	5	5	–	5
Jonathan Laugel	1	1	1	–	–	1	1	–
Andy Timo	88	88	–	88	88	88	88	–
Jefferson-Lee Joseph	47	47	47	47	47	47	47	47
Paul Leraitre	92	92	–	–	–	–	92	–
Jordan Sepho	12	12	12	12	12	12	12	12
Joachim Trouabal	–	11	–	–	–	11	11	–
Joris Simon	–	–	96	–	–	–	–	–
Thibaud Mazzoleni	–	–	15	–	–	15	15	15
Esteban Capilla	–	–	27	27	–	–	27	27
Antoine Dupont	–	–	–	25	25	–	–	25
Nelson Épée	–	–	–	–	7	7	7	7
Jean-Pascal Barraque	–	–	–	–	–	–	10	10
Thomas Carol	–	–	–	–	–	–	21	–

France women's team members 2023–24
Player	Jersey number by tournament							
Player	Dubai	Cape Town	Perth	Vancouver	Los Angeles	Hong Kong	Singapore	Madrid
Joanna Grisez	5	5	5	5	5	5	–	–
Lili Dezou	28	28	28	28	28	28	28	28
Caroline Drouin	10	10	10	10	10	–	–	–
Anne-Cécile Ciofani	2	2	2	2	2	2	–	2
Lou Noel	4	4	4	4	4	4	4	4
Yolaine Yengo	6	6	6	–	6	–	6	6
Carla Neisen	9	9	9	9	9	9	9	9
Chloé Pelle	3	3	3	3	3	3	–	–
Camille Grassineau	8	8	8	8	8	8	8	–
Iän Jason	88	88	88	88	88	–	88	–
Chloé Jacquet	15	15	–	–	–	15	–	15
Mathilde Coutouly	77	77	77	77	–	–	–	–
Valentine Lothoz	7	–	7	7	7	7	7	7
Marie Dupouy	–	27	27	–	–	27	27	27
Séraphine Okemba	–	–	–	1	1	1	1	1
Jade Ulutule	–	–	–	13	13	13	–	–
Montserrat Amedee	–	–	–	–	–	67	67	67
Shannon Izar	–	–	–	–	–	–	11	11
Alycia Chrystiaens	–	–	–	–	–	–	22	22
Cléo Hagel	–	–	–	–	–	–	26	–
Lina Guérin	–	–	–	–	–	–	–	12

== Germany ==
Men's Head Coach: (Spain) Pablo Feijoo

Germany men's team members 2023–24
Player	Jersey number by tournament
Player	Madrid
Maximilian Heid	5
John Dawe	3
Chris Umeh	71
Jakob Dipper	99
Anton Gleitze	10
Max Roddick	9
Felix Hufnagel	1
Luis Diel	15
Ben Ellermann	8
Tim Lichtenberg	12
Philip Gleitze	11
Niklas Koch	4
Makonnen Amekuedi	60

== Great Britain ==
Men's Head Coach: (England) Tony Roques
Women's Head Coach: (Wales) Nick Wakley

Great Britain men's team members 2023–24
Player	Jersey number by tournament							
Player	Dubai	Cape Town	Perth	Vancouver	Los Angeles	Hong Kong	Singapore	Madrid
Jamie Barden	17	17	17	–	17	17	–	17
Alex Davis	3	3	–	3	3	3	3	–
Matt Davidson	26	26	–	–	–	–	–	–
Morgan Williams	9	9	9	9	9	9	9	9
Tom Williams	2	2	2	2	–	–	–	–
Tom Emery	15	15	15	15	15	15	15	–
Jamie Farndale	7	7	7	–	–	–	7	–
Austin Emens	64	64	64	64	64	–	–	–
Kaleem Barreto	4	4	4	4	4	4	4	4
Ethan Waddleton	11	–	11	11	11	11	11	11
Ross McCann	5	5	–	5	5	5	5	5
Robbie Fergusson	10	10	10	10	10	10	10	10
Harry Glover	6	6	6	6	6	6	6	6
Api Bavadra	–	23	23	23	–	–	23	23
Jamie Adamson	–	–	21	–	–	–	–	–
Jordan Edmunds	–	–	1	–	–	–	–	1
Will Homer	–	–	–	12	12	12	12	12
Charlton Kerr	–	–	–	24	24	24	24	24
Femi Sofolarin	–	–	–	–	13	13	–	–
Max McFarland	–	–	–	–	–	14	14	14

Great Britain women's team members 2023–24
Player	Jersey number by tournament							
Player	Dubai	Cape Town	Perth	Vancouver	Los Angeles	Hong Kong	Singapore	Madrid
Rhona Lloyd	16	16	16	–	–	–	16	16
Jasmine Joyce-Butchers	11	11	11	11	11	–	11	11
Shona Campbell	5	5	5	–	5	5	5	–
Abbie Brown	2	2	2	–	–	–	–	2
Isla Norman-Bell	9	9	9	9	9	9	9	9
Heather Cowell	23	23	23	–	–	23	23	23
Lauren Torley	6	6	6	6	–	6	6	6
Grace Crompton	4	4	–	4	4	4	4	–
Emma Uren	7	7	7	7	7	7	7	7
Amy Wilson-Hardy	12	–	12	12	12	12	12	12
Lisa Thomson	1	1	–	1	1	1	1	–
Ellie Boatman	13	13	13	13	13	13	13	13
Jade Shekells	22	22	22	22	22	22	22	22
Georgie Lingham	–	27	–	–	–	–	–	–
Alicia Maude	–	–	95	95	95	95	–	–
Abi Burton	–	–	3	3	3	3	–	–
Kayleigh Powell	–	–	–	18	18	18	18	18
Celia Quansah	–	–	–	8	8	–	–	–
Megan Jones	–	–	–	–	–	–	–	10
Ellie Kildunne	–	–	–	–	–	–	–	15

== Ireland ==
Men's Head Coach: (Ireland) James Topping
Women's Head Coach: (South Africa) Allan Temple-Jones

Ireland men's team members 2023–24
Player	Jersey number by tournament							
Player	Dubai	Cape Town	Perth	Vancouver	Los Angeles	Hong Kong	Singapore	Madrid
Niall Comerford	12	12	12	12	12	12	–	12
Hugo Lennox	9	9	9	9	–	9	–	9
Zac Ward	24	24	24	24	24	24	–	24
Gavin Mullin	99	99	99	99	99	99	99	99
Mark Roche	4	4	4	–	4	4	4	–
Terry Kennedy	10	10	10	10	10	10	10	10
Sean Cribbin	11	11	11	11	11	11	–	11
Shane Jennings	22	22	–	–	–	–	–	–
Billy Dardis	6	6	–	6	6	–	6	6
Chay Mullins	31	31	31	31	31	31	31	31
Harry McNulty	3	3	3	3	3	3	3	3
Jack Kelly	1	1	1	–	–	–	1	–
Jordan Conroy	7	7	7	7	7	–	7	7
Dylan O'Grady	–	–	31	–	–	–	–	–
Connor O'Sullivan	–	–	2	2	2	–	2	–
Matthew McDonald	–	–	–	44	44	44	–	–
Ed Kelly	–	–	–	14	14	14	–	–
Zac McConnell	–	–	–	–	–	66	66	–
Bryan Mollen	–	–	–	–	–	13	13	–
Josh Costello	–	–	–	–	–	–	21	–
Aaron O'Sullivan	–	–	–	–	–	–	15	15
Andrew Smith	–	–	–	–	–	–	–	23
Hugo Keenan	–	–	–	–	–	–	–	8

Ireland women's team members 2023–24
Player	Jersey number by tournament							
Player	Dubai	Cape Town	Perth	Vancouver	Los Angeles	Hong Kong	Singapore	Madrid
Stacey Flood	3	3	3	3	3	3	3	3
Eve Higgins	10	10	10	10	10	–	10	10
Natasja Behan	14	14	–	–	–	14	–	–
Kate Farrell McCabe	11	11	11	11	11	11	11	11
Beibhinn Parsons	7	7	7	7	7	–	–	7
Emily Lane	12	12	12	12	12	12	12	12
Katie Heffernan	2	2	–	–	2	2	–	–
Amee-Leigh Murphy Crowe	5	5	5	5	–	5	5	5
Lucy Mulhall	9	9	9	9	9	–	–	–
Aoibheann Reilly	73	73	73	73	73	–	–	73
Vicky Elmes Kinlan	21	21	21	21	21	21	21	21
Megan Burns	8	8	8	8	8	8	8	8
Erin King	13	13	13	13	13	13	13	13
Lucinda Kinghan	–	–	23	23	23	23	–	–
Vicki Wall	–	–	42	42	–	42	42	–
Alanna Fitzpatrick	–	–	–	–	17	17	17	–
Clare Gorman	–	–	–	–	–	15	–	–
Amy Larn	–	–	–	–	–	–	18	–
Claire Boles	–	–	–	–	–	–	1	–
Ashleigh Baxter	–	–	–	–	–	–	68	68
Anna McGann	–	–	–	–	–	–	–	19
Katie Corrigan	–	–	–	–	–	–	–	24

== Japan ==
Women's Head Coach: (Japan) Takashi Suzuki

Japan women's team members 2023–24
Player	Jersey number by tournament							
Player	Dubai	Cape Town	Perth	Vancouver	Los Angeles	Hong Kong	Singapore	Madrid
Sakura Mizutani	4	4	4	4	4	–	–	–
Emii Tanaka	17	–	17	17	17	17	–	17
Arisa Nishi	22	–	–	–	–	22	22	22
Seika Ohashi	21	21	–	–	–	–	–	–
Mayu Yoshino	14	14	–	14	14	14	–	–
Raichielmiyo Bativakalolo	3	–	3	–	–	3	3	–
Fumiko Otake	19	19	–	–	–	–	–	19
Mio Yamanaka	16	16	16	16	16	–	–	–
Hanako Utsumi	9	–	9	9	9	9	9	–
Sakurako Yazaki	20	–	20	–	–	–	20	20
Wakaba Hara	11	11	–	11	11	11	11	11
Yukino Tsujisaki	15	15	–	–	–	15	15	15
Chiharu Nakamura	1	–	1	1	1	1	1	1
Yume Hirano	–	7	7	7	7	7	7	7
Mei Otani	–	6	6	6	6	6	6	6
Marin Kajiki	–	2	2	2	2	2	2	2
Chiaki Saegusa	–	5	5	5	5	5	5	5
Honoka Tsutsumi	–	13	13	13	13	13	13	13
Michiyo Suda	–	12	12	12	12	–	–	–
Rinka Matsuda	–	–	–	–	–	–	23	23

== Kenya ==
Men's Head Coach: (Kenya) Kelvin Wambua

Kenya men's team members 2023–24
Player	Jersey number by tournament
Player	Madrid
John Okoth	22
Kevin Wakesa	6
Brian Tanga	21
Samuel Asati	9
Nygel Amaitsa	10
Tony Omondi	7
Lamech Ambetsa	99
Herman Humwa	8
George Ooro	3
Patrick Odongo	11
Brian Mutua	33
Christant Ojwang	12
Vincent Onyala	4

== New Zealand ==
Men's Head Coach: (Fiji) Tomasi Cama
Women's Head Coach: (New Zealand) Cory Sweeney

New Zealand men's team members 2023–24
Player	Jersey number by tournament							
Player	Dubai	Cape Town	Perth	Vancouver	Los Angeles	Hong Kong	Singapore	Madrid
Tepaea Cook-Savage	24	24	24	24	24	24	24	24
Fehi Fineanganofo	33	33	33	33	33	33	33	–
Cody Vai	25	25	25	25	25	25	25	25
Leroy Carter	12	12	12	–	–	–	12	12
Ngarohi McGarvey-Black	6	6	6	–	–	–	6	–
Moses Leo	13	13	13	–	–	13	13	13
Che Clark	21	21	–	21	21	21	–	–
Regan Ware	64	–	64	–	–	64	64	64
Sione Molia	27	27	27	–	–	–	–	–
Tim Mikkelson	20	20	20	20	–	–	–	–
Brady Rush	2	2	–	2	2	2	2	2
Akuila Rokolisoa	4	4	4	4	–	–	–	4
Scott Curry	1	1	1	1	1	1	–	1
Xavier Tito-Harris	–	35	–	35	35	35	–	–
Dylan Collier	–	–	5	–	–	5	5	5
Sam Dickson	–	–	7	7	7	–	–	7
Amanaki Nicole	–	–	–	9	9	–	–	–
Roderick Solo	–	–	–	44	44	–	–	–
Joe Webber	–	–	–	11	11	11	–	11
Jayden Keelan	–	–	–	–	15	–	–	–
Andrew Knewstubb	–	–	–	–	8	8	8	8
Tone Ng Shiu	–	–	–	–	–	3	3	3
Kitiona Vai	–	–	–	–	–	–	77	–
Lewis Ormond	–	–	–	–	–	–	23	–

New Zealand women's team members 2023–24
Player	Jersey number by tournament							
Player	Dubai	Cape Town	Perth	Vancouver	Los Angeles	Hong Kong	Singapore	Madrid
Manaia Nuku	33	33	33	33	33	33	33	33
Jorja Miller	83	83	83	83	83	83	83	83
Stacey Waaka	3	3	3	–	–	3	3	3
Risi Pouri-Lane	77	77	77	77	77	77	77	77
Shiray Kaka	22	22	–	22	22	22	22	–
Tenika Willison	99	99	99	99	99	99	–	99
Mahina Paul	81	81	81	81	81	81	81	81
Portia Woodman	11	11	11	11	11	11	11	11
Sarah Hirini	4	–	–	–	–	–	–	–
Alena Saili	72	72	72	–	–	–	72	72
Michaela Blyde	6	6	6	6	6	6	6	6
Kelly Brazier	8	8	–	–	–	–	–	–
Jazmin Hotham	13	13	13	13	13	13	13	13
Tysha Ikenasio	–	26	26	26	26	26	26	26
Kelsey Teneti	–	–	88	88	88	–	–	–
Tyla King	–	–	7	7	7	7	7	7
Theresa Setefano	–	–	–	10	10	10	10	10

== Poland ==
Women's Head Coach: (Poland) Janusz Urbanowicz

Poland women's team members 2023–24
Player	Jersey number by tournament
Player	Madrid
Oliwia Krysiak	17
Natalia Pamięta	11
Hanna Maliszewska	9
Marta Morus	5
Katarzyna Paszczyk	6
Patrycja Zawadzka	1
Martyna Wardaszka	14
Monika Pietrzak	17
Julia Druzgala	10
Malgorzata Koldej	4
Ilona Zaishliuk	13
Oliwia Struginska	18
Sylwia Witowska	12

== Samoa ==
Men's Head Coach: (Samoa) Brian Lima

Samoa men's team members 2023–24
Player	Jersey number by tournament							
Player	Dubai	Cape Town	Perth	Vancouver	Los Angeles	Hong Kong	Singapore	Madrid
Paul Eti Alesana-Slater	55	55	–	55	–	55	55	55
Levi Milford	5	5	–	–	–	–	–	–
Paul Scanlan	15	–	15	–	–	–	–	–
Fa'afoi Falaniko	95	95	95	95	95	95	95	95
Malakesi Masefau	78	78	78	–	–	78	78	78
Pelasio Samuelu Niuula	56	56	–	–	–	–	–	–
Vaovasa Afa Su'a	32	32	32	32	32	–	32	–
Motu Opetai	20	20	20	20	20	20	–	20
Taitaifono Senio Tavita	14	14	–	–	–	–	–	–
BJ Telefoni Lima	27	27	27	27	27	27	–	–
Elisapeta Alofipo	26	26	26	26	26	–	–	26
Taunuu Niulevaea	88	88	88	88	88	–	–	88
Lalomilo Lalomilo	33	33	33	33	33	–	–	–
Pasia Tuifua	–	17	–	–	–	–	–	–
Uaina Tui Sione	–	–	3	3	3	3	3	–
Neueli Leitufia	–	–	8	8	8	8	–	8
Melani Matavao	–	–	7	–	–	–	–	–
Tom Maiava	–	–	10	10	10	10	10	–
Des Sepulona Faoa	–	–	–	6	6	6	6	6
Steve Onosai	–	–	–	12	12	–	12	12
Daniel Patelesio	–	–	–	–	21	21	21	21
Jeff Levy	–	–	–	–	–	4	4	–
Tuna Tuitama	–	–	–	–	–	25	25	25
Pisi Leilua	–	–	–	–	–	11	11	–
Enosa Afemai Misitea	–	–	–	–	–	–	13	13
Va'a Apelu Maliko	–	–	–	–	–	–	–	2

== South Africa ==
Men's Head Coach: (South Africa) Sandile Ngcobo (until Los Angeles), (South Africa) Philip Snyman (from Hong Kong)
Women's Head Coach: (South Africa) Renfred Dazel

South Africa men's team members 2023–24
Player	Jersey number by tournament							
Player	Dubai	Cape Town	Perth	Vancouver	Los Angeles	Hong Kong	Singapore	Madrid
Quewin Nortje	30	30	30	–	–	30	30	30
Ryan Oosthuizen	2	2	2	2	2	2	–	2
Dewald Human	10	10	–	–	–	10	10	–
Masande Mtshali	18	18	18	–	–	–	–	–
Katlego Letbele	35	35	35	35	35	35	35	35
Shilton van Wyk	12	12	12	12	12	12	12	–
Selvyn Davids	8	8	8	8	8	8	8	8
Ronald Brown	7	7	7	–	–	7	–	–
Zain Davids	4	4	4	4	4	4	4	–
Rosko Specman	14	14	–	14	14	–	14	14
Christie Grobbelaar	1	–	–	–	–	1	1	1
Impi Visser	3	3	–	3	3	3	3	3
Justin Geduld	23	23	–	23	23	23	–	23
Tiaan Pretorius	–	6	–	–	–	–	6	6
Donovan Don	–	–	34	–	–	–	–	–
Tristan Leyds	–	–	24	24	24	–	24	24
David Brits	–	–	19	19	19	–	–	–
James Murphy	–	–	5	–	5	–	–	–
Ricardo Duarttee	–	–	29	29	–	–	–	–
Darren Adonis	–	–	–	21	21	21	–	–
Shaun Williams	–	–	–	9	9	9	–	9
Siviwe Soyizwapi	–	–	–	–	–	–	11	11
Dylan Sage	–	–	–	–	–	–	28	28

South Africa women's team members 2023–24
Player	Jersey number by tournament							
Player	Dubai	Cape Town	Perth	Vancouver	Los Angeles	Hong Kong	Singapore	Madrid
Zintle Mpupha	4	–	4	4	4	4	4	4
Libbie Janse van Rensburg	96	–	–	–	–	–	–	96
Shiniqwa Lamprecht	18	18	18	18	18	18	18	18
Liske Lategan	12	12	12	–	12	12	12	12
Simamkele Namba	14	14	14	14	14	14	14	–
Mathrin Simmers	10	10	10	10	10	10	10	10
Asisipho Plaatjies	2	2	–	–	–	–	–	–
Kyla de Vries	20	20	20	–	–	20	20	–
Maria Tshiremba	16	16	16	16	–	–	16	16
Marlize de Bruin	5	5	5	5	5	–	–	–
Ayanda Malinga	3	3	–	3	3	3	3	3
Nadine Roos	9	9	9	9	9	9	9	9
Rights Mkhari	1	1	–	–	–	–	–	–
Byrhandre Dolf	–	21	21	–	–	–	–	21
Kemisetso Baloyi	–	13	13	13	13	13	13	13
Shona-Leah Weston	–	–	8	8	8	8	8	–
Eloise Webb	–	–	7	7	7	–	7	7
Bianca Augustyn	–	–	–	23	23	–	–	–
Alichia Arries	–	–	–	15	15	15	–	–
Zandile Masuku	–	–	–	–	–	11	–	–
Donelle Snyders	–	–	–	–	–	19	–	–
Felicia Jacobs	–	–	–	–	–	–	6	–
Sizophila Solontsi	–	–	–	–	–	–	–	17
Veroeshka Grain	–	–	–	–	–	–	–	24

== Spain ==
Men's Head Coach: (Spain) Francisco Hernández
Women's Head Coach: (Spain) Alberto Socías

Spain men's team members 2023–24
Player	Jersey number by tournament							
Player	Dubai	Cape Town	Perth	Vancouver	Los Angeles	Hong Kong	Singapore	Madrid
Juan Ramos	4	4	4	4	4	–	–	4
Alavaro Gassot	77	–	–	–	–	–	–	–
Enrique Bolinches	13	13	13	–	–	13	13	13
Manu Moreno	10	–	10	–	–	10	10	10
Pol Pla	7	7	7	7	7	–	7	7
Angel Bozal	17	17	–	17	–	–	–	–
Josep Serres	2	2	2	2	2	2	2	2
Nicholas Nieto	6	6	6	6	6	6	6	6
Anton Legorburu	24	24	24	24	24	24	24	24
Juan Martínez	8	8	–	–	–	8	8	–
Miguel Reina	22	22	–	–	–	–	–	–
Jaime Manteca	14	14	14	14	14	14	14	14
Eduardo Lopez	12	12	12	12	12	12	–	12
Alejandro Laforga	–	19	19	–	–	19	19	19
Tobias Sainz-Trapaga	–	1	1	1	1	1	1	1
Francisco Cosculluela	–	–	20	20	20	20	20	–
Asier Perez	–	–	23	23	23	23	23	–
Tiago Romero	–	–	–	11	11	–	11	11
Jeremy Trevithick	–	–	–	29	29	29	–	29
Aratz Goicoechea	–	–	–	–	99	–	–	–

Spain women's team members 2023–24
Player	Jersey number by tournament							
Player	Dubai	Cape Town	Perth	Vancouver	Los Angeles	Hong Kong	Singapore	Madrid
Zahia Perez	16	16	–	–	–	–	–	–
Juana Stella	25	–	25	25	25	25	25	25
Claudia Perez Perez	18	18	–	–	–	–	–	–
Lide Erbina	19	–	19	–	–	19	–	19
Eva Aguirre Diaz	1	1	1	1	1	–	1	1
Beatriz Dominguez	2	2	2	2	2	2	2	2
Maria Calvo	12	12	12	12	12	12	12	12
Paula Requena	7	7	7	7	7	7	7	7
Amaia Erbina	3	3	3	3	3	–	3	3
Marta Cantabrana Gil	14	14	14	14	14	14	14	14
Jimena Blanco-Hortiguera	23	23	23	23	23	23	23	23
Olivia Fresnada	8	8	8	–	–	8	8	8
Amalia Argudo	4	4	4	–	–	–	4	–
Claudia Peña Hidalgo	–	17	–	–	–	–	–	–
Ingrid Algar	–	–	9	9	9	9	9	–
Anne Fernández de Corres	–	–	10	10	10	10	10	10
Cristina Lopez	–	–	–	5	5	5	–	5
Elisabet Segara Cararach	–	–	–	15	15	15	–	15
Denisse Gortazar	–	–	–	21	21	–	–	–
Alba Martinez	–	–	–	–	–	27	–	–
Anael Fernandez Terenzi	–	–	–	–	–	–	26	–

== United States ==
Men's Head Coach: (England) Mike Friday
Women's Head Coach: (United States) Emilie Bydwell

United States men's team members 2023–24
Player	Jersey number by tournament							
Player	Dubai	Cape Town	Perth	Vancouver	Los Angeles	Hong Kong	Singapore	Madrid
Will Chevalier	23	23	–	–	–	–	–	–
Madison Hughes	30	30	30	30	30	30	30	30
Naima Fuala'au	7	7	7	7	7	–	7	7
Marcus Tupuola	14	14	14	14	14	14	14	–
Orrin Bizer	13	13	13	13	13	13	–	13
Malacchi Esdale	8	8	8	8	8	8	8	8
Lance Williams	17	17	17	–	–	–	–	17
Aaron Cummings	1	1	1	1	1	1	1	1
Pita Vi	25	–	–	–	–	25	25	25
Lucas Lacamp	12	12	12	12	12	–	12	12
Adam Channel	18	18	–	18	–	–	18	–
Ben Pinkelman	28	28	–	–	28	–	–	–
Ben Broselle	2	2	–	–	–	–	–	–
Jack Wendling	–	3	–	–	–	–	–	–
Joe Schroeder	–	–	5	5	5	5	5	–
Kevon Williams	–	–	6	6	6	6	6	6
Maka Unufe	–	–	77	77	77	77	–	77
Perry Baker	–	–	11	11	11	11	11	11
Stephen Tomasin	–	–	9	9	9	9	9	9
Maceo Brown	–	–	–	–	–	4	4	–
Faitala Talapusi	–	–	–	–	–	10	–	10

United States women's team members 2023–24
Player	Jersey number by tournament							
Player	Dubai	Cape Town	Perth	Vancouver	Los Angeles	Hong Kong	Singapore	Madrid
Ilona Maher	2	2	2	2	2	2	–	2
Cheta Emba	1	1	–	1	–	–	1	–
Ariana Ramsey	21	21	–	21	21	–	–	21
Alev Kelter	5	5	5	5	5	5	5	5
Alena Olsen	6	6	6	6	6	6	6	6
Sammy Sullivan	22	22	22	22	22	22	22	22
Kristen Thomas	11	11	–	–	11	11	–	11
Kayla Canett	3	3	3	3	3	3	3	3
Lauren Doyle	23	23	–	23	23	23	23	23
Alex Sedrick	17	17	17	17	17	17	–	17
Naya Tapper	7	7	7	7	7	–	–	–
Jazmine Gray	99	99	99	–	–	99	99	–
Nicole Heavirland	4	4	4	–	–	–	4	4
Sarah Levy	–	–	13	13	13	13	13	13
Summer Harris-Jones	–	–	27	–	–	–	27	–
Kristi Kirshe	–	–	12	12	12	12	–	12
Stephanie Rovetti	–	–	10	10	10	10	–	10
Kaylen Thomas	–	–	–	–	–	19	19	–
Joanne Fa'avesi	–	–	–	–	–	–	9	–
Jessica Lu	–	–	–	–	–	–	16	–

== Uruguay ==
Men's Head Coach: (Uruguay) Ivo Dugonjic

Uruguay men's team members 2023–24
Player	Jersey number by tournament
Player	Madrid
Guillermo Lijtenstein	9
Felipe Arcos Pérez	20
Ignacio Alvarez Akiki	13
Diego Ardao	6
Juan Manuel Tafernaberry	4
Mateo Viñals	7
Ignacio Facciolo	11
James Mc Cubbin	1
Tomás Etcheverry	3
Dante Soto	23
Bautista Basso	5
Juan González	12
Valentin Grille	2
