= Esteban Capilla =

French rugby union player (born 2003)

- Capilla in 2024
- Born: Esteban Capilla; 5 January 2003 (age 23) Saint-Saulve, France
- Height: 1.97 m (6 ft 5 1/2 in)
- Weight: 99 kg (15 st 8 lb; 218 lb)

Rugby union career
- Position(s): Flanker, Prop
- Current team: Bayonne
Youth career
- 2010–2013: AS Bayonne
- 2013–2015: US Mouguerre
- 2013–2015: AS St-Martin-de-Seignanx
- 2016–2024: Bayonne
Senior career
Years	Team	Apps	(Points)
2022–	Bayonne	32	(55)
- Correct as of 18 October 2025
International career
Years	Team	Apps	(Points)
2022–2023	France U20	7	(10)
2026–	France	1	(0)
- Correct as of 11 November 2026
National sevens team
Years	Team		Comps
2022–2024	France		32 (55)

Esteban Capilla (born 5 January 2003) is a French rugby union player. He currently plays as a flanker for Bayonne in the Top 14 and for the France national rugby union team.

== Early life ==
Capilla was born in Saint-Saulve on 5 January 2003, but moved to New Caledonia due to his father's work in the military, where he began playing rugby sevens. He joined AS Bayonne in 2010, US Mouguerre in 2013, AS St-Martin-de-Seignanx in 2015 before moving to Bayonne in 2016.

== International career ==
Capilla was first called up to the France U-20 team for the 2022 Six Nations Under 20s Championship. He was selected as part of the France U-20 team for the 2023 World Rugby U20 Championship, helping France claim their third straight title.

On 23 June 2026, Capilla was called up to the French national team for the 2026 Nations Championship Southern Hemisphere Series for the first time. However, he failed to make an appearance. On 21 October 2026, Capilla was called up for the 2026 Nations Championship Northern Hemisphere Series. He made his debut against Fiji on 7 November.

=== France 7s ===
In October 2021, Capilla, was selected by the France national rugby sevens team for a preparation tournament in Elche. In May 2022, Capilla joined the France squad for the France Sevens, finishing third. Capilla was called up for the 2022 Rugby World Cup Sevens, where he helped France finish sixth.

During 2023/24 SVNS season, Capilla participated in the Australia Sevens, Canada Sevens and USA Sevens, where he suffered a thigh injury. France would win that tournament and later claim the title that season.

== Honors ==
France U20

- World Rugby Under 20 Championship: 2023

France 7

- HSBC SVNS Series:
  - Winner: 2024
- USA Sevens:
  - Winner: 2024
