= Plaatjies =

Plaatjies is a surname. Notable people with the surname include:

- Asisipho Plaatjies (born1996), South African rugby player
- Dizu Plaatjies (born 1959), Xhosa musician
- Francois Plaatjies (born 1986), South African cricketer
- Mary-Anne Plaatjies van Huffel (1959–2020), South African pastor
- Sydney Plaatjies (born 1981), Namibian footballer
