= Varian Pasquet =

French rugby union player (born 1999)

- Full name: Varian Joseph Pasquet
- Born: 29 July 1999 (age 27) Paris, France
- Height: 1.92 m (6 ft 4 in)
- Weight: 90 kg (198 lb)

Rugby union career
Senior career
Years	Team	Apps	(Points)
2020-2021	Stade Français		
National sevens team
Years	Team		Comps
2021-	France		
Medal record
Men's rugby sevens
Representing France
Olympic Games
Gold medal – first place	2024 Paris	Team competition

Varian Joseph Pasquet (born 29 July 1999) is a French rugby union player. He played for the France national rugby sevens team at the 2024 Paris Olympics.

== Career ==
In December 2020, he made his professional debut for Stade Français when he came on as a substitute for Julien Delbouis in the European Challenge Cup against Benetton Treviso. The following year, he joined the French rugby sevens development team.

In 2022, he signed a contract with the French Rugby Federation to play on a full-time basis for the France national rugby sevens team.

He played as France 7s won the 2024 USA Sevens in Los Angeles, beating Great Britain in the final for their first international tournament win for 19 years. He also played as France won the 2024 Spain Sevens in Madrid.

In July 2024, he was confirmed in the French team for the 2024 Paris Olympics.

== Personal life ==
He graduated with a degree in mathematics and computer science from Paris Cité University in 2020.
