= Kaylen Thomas =

American rugby player (born 2003)

Personal information
- Born: June 23, 2003 (age 23)
- Home town: Brentwood, Tennessee, U.S.
- University: Southwestern College

Rugby union career
- Position: Wing
National sevens team
Years	Team	Comps
2024-	United States	

Kaylen Thomas (born 23 June 2004) is an American rugby union player who plays for the United States women's national rugby sevens team.

== Biography ==
From Brentwood, Tennessee, she attended Ravenwood High School, graduating in 2022. Thomas excelled in multiple sports, and was a state and region wrestling champion in 2022, as well as state champion in flag football, and an All-State bronze medallist in track and field. She later attended Mount St. Mary’s University in Emmitsburg, Maryland, and enrolled at Southwestern College in Chula Vista, California, completing an associate’s degree in kinesiology.

Thomas took up rugby union in 2020 with Ravenwood Raptor Rugby Club and was MVP as they won the Tennessee State Championship title in her first season. Having played with the USA South Panthers representative side, within a year she was invited to a United States U18 training camp before playing for the age grade teams in 2021 and 2022. In 2023 she became an U20 United States international before later playing for the U23 United States team. For the 2023-24 season she became part of Emilie Bydwell senior Eagles squad.

She made her debut for the United States women's national rugby sevens team at the 2024 Hong Kong Sevens as a teenager. She suffered a dislocated wrist in the semi-final against Australia at the 2024 South Africa Sevens in Cape Town, which ended her 2024-25 SVNS campaign.

Returning to the team for the 2025-26 SVNS at the 2025 Dubai Sevens, she scored a try in 15 of her first 25 games, with 21 individual tries. In Vancouver at the 2026 Canada Sevens, Thomas scored two tries in the final two minutes to help the United States secure a victory in the bronze medal match against France. Also in the 2025-26 season, her performances included tries against Spain and Argentina at the 2026 Hong Kong Sevens. She was a try scorer as USA beat Australia in the pool stages, and then also a try-scorer in the semi-final as USA reached the final of the 2026 Spain Sevens in Valladolid. In the pools stages at the series final in Bordeaux in June 2026, Thomas scored her 33rd try of the SVNS season to set a new USA record.
