= Kyla de Vries =

- Born: 9 November 1995 (age 31)

Rugby union career
National sevens team
Years	Team	Comps
- South Africa

Kyla de Vries (born 9 November 1995) is a South African rugby sevens player.

== Career ==
De Vries was named in South Africa's squad for the 2022 Commonwealth Games in Birmingham, they finished in seventh place. She featured for the Springbok women's sevens side at the 2023 Dubai Women's Sevens.
