= Bianca Augustyn =

South African rugby sevens player

- Born: 18 March 1998 (age 28)

Rugby union career
National sevens team
Years	Team	Comps
- South Africa

Bianca Augustyn (born 18 March 1998) is a South African rugby sevens player. She competed for South Africa at the 2022 Commonwealth Games in Birmingham where they finished in seventh place.
