= Shiray Kaka =

New Zealand rugby union player

- Kaka in 2023
- Born: 26 March 1995 (age 31) Hamilton, New Zealand
- Height: 1.68 m (5 ft 6 in)
- Weight: 68 kg (150 lb)

Rugby union career
National sevens team
Years	Team	Comps
2013–Present	New Zealand	133 apps
Medal record
Women's rugby sevens
Representing New Zealand
Olympic Games
Gold medal – first place	2020 Tokyo	Team competition
Rugby World Cup Sevens
Silver medal – second place	2022 Cape Town	Team competition
Commonwealth Games
Bronze medal – third place	2022 Birmingham	Team competition

Shiray Kaka (née Tane; born 26 March 1995) is a New Zealand rugby sevens player. She won a gold medal with the Black Ferns sevens team at the 2020 Summer Olympics in Tokyo.

== Rugby career ==
=== 2013–2016 ===
Kaka made her international debut for the Black Ferns sevens at the 2013 Dubai sevens. Along with Michaela Blyde she was one of the two traveling reserves for the 2016 Rio Olympic team, which required them to stay in accommodation outside of the Olympic village away from the rest of the team.

=== 2021 ===
In 2021, Kaka was part of the Black Ferns sevens squad that won a gold medal at the delayed Tokyo Olympics.

=== 2022 ===
Kaka was named in the Black Ferns Sevens squad for the 2022 Commonwealth Games in Birmingham. She won a bronze medal at the event. She was a member of the side that finished as runner-up at the Sevens Rugby World Cup held in Cape Town, South Africa in September 2022.

=== 2023-24 ===
In the quarterfinal against Great Britain on 4 May 2024 at the Singapore she ruptured the anterior cruciate ligament (ACL) in her right knee. This injury ruled her out being available for the Grand Final tournament of the 2023-24 season in Madrid and the Paris Olympics. This was her third ACL injury.

== Personal life ==
Kaka is a New Zealander of Māori descent (Ngāti Maniapoto) and Samoan descent.

In 2019, She was living in Japan where she was studying to be a dog trainer and starting a business in adventure dog walking. Her husband is former All Black Sevens star Gillies Kaka.

In December 2023 Kaka was awarded a Prime Minister’s Scholarship internship, which she intended to use to study media.
