= 2024 Canada Sevens =

World Rugby Sevens Series tournaments

- 2023–24 SVNS
- Host nation: Canada

Men
- Date: February 23–25, 2024
- Champion: Argentina
- Runner-up: New Zealand
- Third: France

Women
- Date: February 23–25, 2024
- Champion: New Zealand
- Runner-up: France
- Third: Canada

Tournament details
- Matches played: 64

The 2024 Canada Sevens or SVNS VAN is a rugby sevens tournament played at BC Place. Twelve men's and women's teams participate.

Argentina won the men's event and their third consecutive title in Canada, defeating New Zealand in the final. New Zealand won the women's event and their sixth title in Canada, defeating France in the final.

== Men's tournament ==
=== Pool stage ===
Points system: Teams were awarded 3 points for a win, 2 points for a draw and 0 points for a loss. For a loss of 7 points or fewer teams were awarded 1 bonus point.

Key to colours in pool tables
Teams that advanced to the cup quarterfinals
Teams that advanced to the 9th place semifinals

=== Pool A ===
Pos	Team	Pld	W	L	PF	PA	PD	BP	Pts
1	Argentina	3	3	0	74	36	+38	0	9
2	Fiji	3	2	1	72	50	+22	1	7
3	Spain	3	1	2	52	83	–31	0	3
4	Canada	3	0	3	36	65	–29	1	1

February 23
15:20

Fiji	31–14	Spain

BC Place, Vancouver

February 23
15:42

Argentina	12–10	Canada

BC Place, Vancouver

February 23
20:24

Fiji	22–12	Canada

BC Place, Vancouver

February 23
20:46

Argentina	38–7	Spain

BC Place, Vancouver

February 24
14:11

Spain	31–14	Canada

BC Place, Vancouver

February 24
14:33

Argentina	24–19	Fiji

BC Place, Vancouver

=== Pool B ===
Pos	Team	Pld	W	L	PF	PA	PD	BP	Pts
1	France	3	3	0	95	24	+71	0	9
2	United States	3	2	1	59	52	+7	0	6
3	Samoa	3	1	2	45	68	–23	0	3
4	Australia	3	0	3	33	88	–55	1	1

February 23
14:36

France	24–12	United States

BC Place, Vancouver

February 23
14:58

Australia	7–31	Samoa

BC Place, Vancouver

February 23
19:40

France	40–7	Samoa

BC Place, Vancouver

February 23
20:02

Australia	21–26	United States

BC Place, Vancouver

February 24
13:27

United States	21–7	Samoa

BC Place, Vancouver

February 24
13:49

Australia	5–31	France

BC Place, Vancouver

=== Pool C ===
Pos	Team	Pld	W	L	PF	PA	PD	BP	Pts
1	New Zealand	3	2	1	57	40	+17	0	6
2	Great Britain	3	2	1	39	52	–13	0	6
3	Ireland	3	1	2	50	46	+4	1	5
4	South Africa	3	1	2	43	51	–8	1	4

February 23
13:52

South Africa	21–12	New Zealand

BC Place, Vancouver

February 23
14:14

Ireland	14–17	Great Britain

BC Place, Vancouver

February 23
18:56

South Africa	12–17	Great Britain

BC Place, Vancouver

February 23
19:18

Ireland	14–19	New Zealand

BC Place, Vancouver

February 24
12:43

New Zealand	26–5	Great Britain

BC Place, Vancouver

February 24
13:05

Ireland	22–10	South Africa

BC Place, Vancouver

=== 9th to 12th playoffs ===
9th place semifinals
February 24, 2024– 17:38 – BC Place
South Africa	20
Canada	14
February 24, 2024– 18:00 – BC Place
Spain	14
Australia	19

9th place final
February 25, 2024– 11:21 – BC Place
South Africa	24
Australia	7
11th place final
February 25, 2024– 10:37 – BC Place
Canada	12
Spain	17 (a.e.t.)

=== 5th to 8th playoffs ===
Key to colours in table
Teams that advanced to the 5th place final
Teams that advanced to the 7th place final

Team	Points Difference
Fiji	+20
Ireland	–3
Samoa	–25
Great Britain	–40

Fifth Place

February 25
14:48

Fiji	19–24 (a.e.t.)	Ireland

BC Place, Vancouver

Seventh Place

February 25
14:04

Samoa	14–19 (a.e.t.)	Great Britain

BC Place, Vancouver

=== Cup ===
Quarterfinals
February 24, 2024– 18:22 – BC Place
United States	27
Great Britain	0
February 24, 2024– 18:44 – BC Place
Argentina	14
Samoa	12
February 24, 2024– 19:06 – BC Place
New Zealand	21
Fiji	19
February 24, 2024– 19:28 – BC Place
France	12
Ireland	5

Semifinals
February 25, 2024– 12:43 – BC Place
United States	19
Argentina	35
February 25, 2024– 13:05 – BC Place
New Zealand	28
France	26

Final
February 25, 2024– 17:23 – BC Place
Argentina	36
New Zealand	12
3rd place final
February 25, 2024– 16:10 – BC Place
United States	12
France	42

=== Final placings ===
Place	Team
1st place, gold medalist(s)	Argentina
2nd place, silver medalist(s)	New Zealand
3rd place, bronze medalist(s)	France
4	United States
5	Ireland
6	Fiji
7	Great Britain
8	Samoa
9	South Africa
10	Australia
11	Spain
12	Canada

=== Dream Team ===
Player	Country
Perry Baker	United States
Sam Dickson	New Zealand
Akuila Rokolisoa	New Zealand
Antoine Dupont	France
Luciano González	Argentina
Matías Osadczuk	Argentina
Tobias Wade	Argentina

== Women's tournament ==
=== Pool stage ===
Points system: Teams were awarded 3 points for a win, 2 points for a draw and 0 points for a loss. For a loss of 7 points or fewer teams were awarded 1 bonus point.

Key to colours in pool tables
Teams that advanced to the cup quarterfinals
Teams that advanced to the 9th place semifinals

=== Pool A ===
Pos	Team	Pld	W	L	PF	PA	PD	BP	Pts
1	New Zealand	3	3	0	118	17	+101	0	9
2	Brazil	3	2	1	48	59	–11	0	6
3	Ireland	3	1	2	40	74	–34	0	3
4	South Africa	3	0	3	24	80	–56	1	1

February 23
12:14

New Zealand	40–7	Brazil

BC Place, Vancouver

February 23
12:36

Ireland	28–7	South Africa

BC Place, Vancouver

February 23
17:08

New Zealand	35–5	South Africa

BC Place, Vancouver

February 23
17:30

Ireland	7–24	Brazil

BC Place, Vancouver

February 24
10:59

Brazil	17–12	South Africa

BC Place, Vancouver

February 24
11:21

Ireland	5–43	New Zealand

BC Place, Vancouver

=== Pool B ===
Pos	Team	Pld	W	L	PF	PA	PD	BP	Pts
1	Australia	3	3	0	55	34	+21	0	9
2	United States	3	2	1	59	46	+13	1	7
3	Fiji	3	1	2	65	59	+6	1	4
4	Japan	3	0	3	34	74	–40	1	1

February 23
11:30

United States	21–17	Fiji

BC Place, Vancouver

February 23
11:52

Australia	12–10	Japan

BC Place, Vancouver

February 23
16:24

United States	26–12	Japan

BC Place, Vancouver

February 23
16:46

Australia	26–12	Fiji

BC Place, Vancouver

February 24
10:15

Fiji	36–12	Japan

BC Place, Vancouver

February 24
10:37

Australia	(a.e.t.) 17–12	United States

BC Place, Vancouver

=== Pool C ===
Pos	Team	Pld	W	L	PF	PA	PD	BP	Pts
1	France	3	3	0	76	31	+45	0	9
2	Canada	3	2	1	74	31	+43	0	6
3	Spain	3	1	2	31	53	–22	0	3
4	Great Britain	3	0	3	22	88	–66	1	1

February 23
12:58

France	26–14	Canada

BC Place, Vancouver

February 23
13:20

Great Britain	12–19	Spain

BC Place, Vancouver

February 23
17:52

France	19–7	Spain

BC Place, Vancouver

February 23
18:14

Canada	38–0	Great Britain

BC Place, Vancouver

February 24
11:43

Canada	22–5	Spain

BC Place, Vancouver

February 24
12:05

Great Britain	10–31	France

BC Place, Vancouver

=== 9th to 12th playoffs ===
9th place semifinals
February 24, 2024– 15:11 – BC Place
Japan	24
South Africa	5
February 24, 2024– 15:33 – BC Place
Ireland	21
Great Britain	7

9th place final
February 25, 2024– 10:59 – BC Place
Japan	7
Ireland	12
11th place final
February 25, 2024– 10:15 – BC Place
South Africa	5
Great Britain	12

=== 5th to 8th playoffs ===
Key to colours in table
Teams that advanced to the 5th place final
Teams that advanced to the 7th place final

Team	Points Difference
United States	+11
Fiji	–10
Brazil	–30
Spain	–58

Fifth Place

February 25
14:48

United States	29–7	Fiji

BC Place, Vancouver

Seventh Place

February 25
13:42

Brazil	12–15	Spain

BC Place, Vancouver

=== Cup ===
Quarterfinals
February 24, 2024– 15:55 – BC Place
United States	10
Canada	12
February 24, 2024– 16:17 – BC Place
New Zealand	36
Spain	0
February 24, 2024– 16:39 – BC Place
France	24
Brazil	5
February 24, 2024– 17:01 – BC Place
Australia	35
Fiji	19

Semifinals
February 25, 2024– 11:59 – BC Place
Canada	7
New Zealand	15
February 25, 2024– 12:21 – BC Place
France	21
Australia	19

Final
February 25, 2024– 16:43 – BC Place
New Zealand	35
France	19
3rd place final
February 25, 2024– 15:40 – BC Place
Canada	19
Australia	14

=== Final placings ===
Place	Team
1st place, gold medalist(s)	New Zealand
2nd place, silver medalist(s)	France
3rd place, bronze medalist(s)	Canada
4	Australia
5	United States
6	Fiji
7	Spain
8	Brazil
9	Ireland
10	Japan
11	Great Britain
12	South Africa

=== Dream Team ===
Player	Country
Michaela Blyde	New Zealand
Shiray Kaka	New Zealand
Thalia Costa	Brazil
Séraphine Okemba	France
Ariana Ramsey	United States
Krissy Scurfield	Canada
Dominique du Toit	Australia

2023–24 SVNS
Preceded by 2024 Australia Sevens	2024 Canada Sevens	Succeeded by 2024 USA Sevens
