= 2023 South Africa Sevens =

World Rugby Sevens Series tournaments

2023 Cape Town Sevens
- 2023–24 SVNS
- Host nation: South Africa

Men
- Date: 9–10 December 2023
- Champion: Argentina
- Runner-up: Australia
- Third: Fiji

Women
- Date: 9–10 December 2023
- Champion: Australia
- Runner-up: France
- Third: New Zealand

Tournament details
- Matches played: 64

The 2023 South Africa Sevens or SVNS CPT was a rugby sevens tournament played at DHL Stadium. Twelve men's and women's teams participated.

In the men's competition, hosts South Africa were knocked out in the quarterfinals by Australia after losing to Ireland in their final group game.

Champions Samoa failed to qualify from the group stages and beaten 2022 finalists New Zealand also lost a group game before managing to make it through to the knockouts.

In the women's competition, 2022 champions New Zealand kicked off with a win over Great Britain.

During her team's win over Canada in the quarter-final New Zealander Michaela Blyde became the second women to score 200 tries in the international sevens competition.

Argentina won the men's event and their first title in South Africa, defeating Australia in the final. Australia won the women's event and their first ever title in South Africa, defeating France in the final.

== Men's tournament ==
=== Pool stage ===
Points system: Teams were awarded 3 points for a win, 2 points for a draw and 0 points for a loss. For a loss of 7 points or fewer teams were awarded 1 bonus point.

Key to colours in pool tables
Teams that advanced to the cup quarterfinals
Teams that advanced to the 9th place semifinals

=== Pool A ===
Pos	Team	Pld	W	L	PF	PA	PD	BP	Pts
1	Ireland	3	3	0	64	26	+38	0	9
2	South Africa	3	2	1	57	33	+24	1	7
3	Great Britain	3	1	2	50	64	–14	1	4
4	United States	3	0	3	40	88	–48	1	1

9 December
10:50

Ireland	31–0	United States

DHL Stadium, Cape Town

9 December
10:50

South Africa	19–5	Great Britain

DHL Stadium, Cape Town

9 December
13:50

Ireland	19–14	Great Britain

DHL Stadium, Cape Town

9 December
14:12

South Africa	26–14	United States

DHL Stadium, Cape Town

9 December
19:12

United States	26–31 (a.e.t.)	Great Britain

DHL Stadium, Cape Town

9 December
19:34

South Africa	12–14	Ireland

DHL Stadium, Cape Town

=== Pool B ===
Pos	Team	Pld	W	L	PF	PA	PD	BP	Pts
1	Fiji	3	2	1	66	36	+30	1	7
2	Argentina	3	2	1	64	38	+26	1	7
3	France	3	2	1	45	54	–9	0	6
4	Spain	3	0	3	38	85	–47	1	1

9 December
10:28

Fiji	14–17	France

DHL Stadium, Cape Town

9 December
10:28

Argentina	31–12	Spain

DHL Stadium, Cape Town

9 December
13:06

Fiji	33–7	Spain

DHL Stadium, Cape Town

9 December
13:28

Argentina	21–7	France

DHL Stadium, Cape Town

9 December
18:28

France	21–19	Spain

DHL Stadium, Cape Town

9 December
18:50

Argentina	12–19	Fiji

DHL Stadium, Cape Town

=== Pool C ===
Pos	Team	Pld	W	L	PF	PA	PD	BP	Pts
1	Australia	3	2	1	58	49	+9	0	6
2	Canada	3	2	1	59	40	+19	0	6
3	New Zealand	3	1	2	56	45	+11	1	4
4	Samoa	3	1	2	35	74	–39	0	3

9 December
10:06

Samoa	7–27	Australia

DHL Stadium, Cape Town

9 December
10:06

New Zealand	7–19	Canada

DHL Stadium, Cape Town

9 December
12:22

Samoa	7–33	Canada

DHL Stadium, Cape Town

9 December
12:44

New Zealand	35–5	Australia

DHL Stadium, Cape Town

9 December
17:22

Australia	26–7	Canada

DHL Stadium, Cape Town

9 December
17:44

New Zealand	14–21	Samoa

DHL Stadium, Cape Town

=== 9th to 12th playoffs ===
9th place semifinals
10 December 2023– 09:54 – DHL Stadium
Samoa	17
Spain	24
10 December 2023– 10:16 – DHL Stadium
Great Britain	21
United States	14

9th place final
10 December 2023– 13:28 – DHL Stadium
Spain	7
Great Britain	31
11th place final
10 December 2023– 12:44 – DHL Stadium
Samoa	19
United States	24

=== 5th to 8th playoffs ===
Key to colours in table
Teams that advanced to the 5th place final
Teams that advanced to the 7th place final

Team	Points difference
New Zealand	+6
South Africa	–4
France	–14
Canada	–14

Fifth place

10 December
16:52

South Africa	7–31	New Zealand

DHL Stadium, Cape Town

Seventh place

10 December
16:08

Canada	33–17	France

DHL Stadium, Cape Town

=== Cup ===
Quarterfinals
10 December 2023– 10:34 – DHL Stadium
Argentina	33
Canada	0
10 December 2023– 10:56 – DHL Stadium
Ireland	36
New Zealand	21
10 December 2023– 11:18 – DHL Stadium
Australia	28
South Africa	0
10 December 2023– 11:40 – DHL Stadium
Fiji	29
France	24

Semifinals
10 December 2023– 14:56 – DHL Stadium
Argentina	26
Ireland	19
10 December 2023– 15:18 – DHL Stadium
Australia	24
Fiji	7

Final
10 December 2023– 19:23 – DHL Stadium
Argentina	45
Australia	12
3rd place final
10 December 2023– 18:10 – DHL Stadium
Ireland	7
Fiji	14

=== Final placings ===
Place	Team
1st place, gold medalist(s)	Argentina
2nd place, silver medalist(s)	Australia
3rd place, bronze medalist(s)	Fiji
4	Ireland
5	New Zealand
6	South Africa
7	Canada
8	France
9	Great Britain
10	Spain
11	United States
12	Samoa

=== Dream Team ===
Player	Country
Terry Kennedy	Ireland
Maurice Longbottom	Australia
Nathan Lawson	Australia
James Turner	Australia
Kaminieli Rasaku	Fiji
Matías Osadczuk	Argentina
Germán Schulz	Argentina

== Women's tournament ==
=== Pool stage ===
Points system: Teams were awarded 3 points for a win, 2 points for a draw and 0 points for a loss. For a loss of 7 points or fewer teams were awarded 1 bonus point.

Key to colours in pool tables
Teams that advanced to the cup quarterfinals
Teams that advanced to the 9th place semifinals

=== Pool A ===
Pos	Team	Pld	W	L	PF	PA	PD	BP	Pts
1	Australia	3	3	0	120	7	+113	0	9
2	Fiji	3	2	1	57	50	+7	0	6
3	Japan	3	1	2	34	109	–75	0	3
4	Spain	3	0	3	29	74	–45	2	2

9 December
09:22

Fiji	36–12	Japan

DHL Stadium, Cape Town

9 December
09:22

Australia	38–0	Spain

DHL Stadium, Cape Town

9 December
11:34

Fiji	14–10	Spain

DHL Stadium, Cape Town

9 December
11:34

Australia	54–0	Japan

DHL Stadium, Cape Town

9 December
15:32

Japan	22–19	Spain

DHL Stadium, Cape Town

9 December
15:54

Australia	28–7	Fiji

DHL Stadium, Cape Town

=== Pool B ===
Pos	Team	Pld	W	L	PF	PA	PD	BP	Pts
1	New Zealand	3	3	0	92	24	+68	0	9
2	Great Britain	3	2	1	50	64	–14	0	6
3	Ireland	3	1	2	61	66	–5	1	4
4	Brazil	3	0	3	38	87	–49	0	0

9 December
09:00

Ireland	39–14	Brazil

DHL Stadium, Cape Town

9 December
09:00

New Zealand	37–5	Great Britain

DHL Stadium, Cape Town

9 December
11:12

Ireland	15–19	Great Britain

DHL Stadium, Cape Town

9 December
11:12

New Zealand	22–12	Brazil

DHL Stadium, Cape Town

9 December
14:48

Brazil	12–26	Great Britain

DHL Stadium, Cape Town

9 December
15:10

New Zealand	33–7	Ireland

DHL Stadium, Cape Town

=== Pool C ===
Pos	Team	Pld	W	L	PF	PA	PD	BP	Pts
1	France	3	3	0	79	24	+55	0	9
2	United States	3	2	1	55	45	+10	0	6
3	Canada	3	1	2	71	40	+31	2	5
4	South Africa	3	0	3	7	103	–96	0	0

9 December
09:44

Canada	14–21	United States

DHL Stadium, Cape Town

9 December
09:44

France	29–7	South Africa

DHL Stadium, Cape Town

9 December
11:56

Canada	40–0	South Africa

DHL Stadium, Cape Town

9 December
11:56

France	31–0	United States

DHL Stadium, Cape Town

9 December
16:38

United States	34–0	South Africa

DHL Stadium, Cape Town

9 December
17:00

France	19–17	Canada

DHL Stadium, Cape Town

=== 9th to 12th playoffs ===
9th place semifinals
10 December 2023– 09:00 – DHL Stadium
Spain	7
Brazil	21
10 December 2023– 09:22 – DHL Stadium
Japan	27
South Africa	7

9th place final
10 December 2023– 13:06 – DHL Stadium
Brazil	15
Japan	14
11th place final
10 December 2023– 12:22 – DHL Stadium
Spain	21
South Africa	7

=== 5th to 8th playoffs ===
Key to colours in table
Teams that advanced to the 5th place final
Teams that advanced to the 7th place final

Team	Points difference
Fiji	+5
Canada	–10
Ireland	–15
Great Britain	–21

Fifth place

10 December
16:30

Fiji	19–17	Canada

DHL Stadium, Cape Town

Seventh place

10 December
15:46

Ireland	17–5	Great Britain

DHL Stadium, Cape Town

=== Cup ===
Quarterfinals
10 December 2023– 09:00 – DHL Stadium
Great Britain	12
United States	19
10 December 2023– 09:22 – DHL Stadium
Australia	24
Ireland	14
10 December 2023– 09:44 – DHL Stadium
France	19
Fiji	17
10 December 2023– 10:06 – DHL Stadium
New Zealand	41
Canada	0

Semifinals
10 December 2023– 14:12 – DHL Stadium
United States	5
Australia	33
10 December 2023– 14:34 – DHL Stadium
France	24
New Zealand	12

Final
10 December 2023– 18:43 – DHL Stadium
Australia	29
France	26
3rd place final
10 December 2023– 17:40 – DHL Stadium
United States	7
New Zealand	19

=== Final placings ===
Place	Team
1st place, gold medalist(s)	Australia
2nd place, silver medalist(s)	France
3rd place, bronze medalist(s)	New Zealand
4	United States
5	Fiji
6	Canada
7	Ireland
8	Great Britain
9	Brazil
10	Japan
11	Spain
12	South Africa

=== Dream Team ===
Player	Country
Emma Uren	Great Britain
Naya Tapper	United States
Jazmin Felix-Hotham	New Zealand
Anne-Cécile Ciofani	France
Camille Grassineau	France
Bienne Terita	Australia
Teagan Levi	Australia

2023–24 SVNS
Preceded by 2023 Dubai Sevens	2023 South Africa Sevens	Succeeded by 2024 Australia Sevens
