= Fehi Fineanganofo =

New Zealand rugby union player

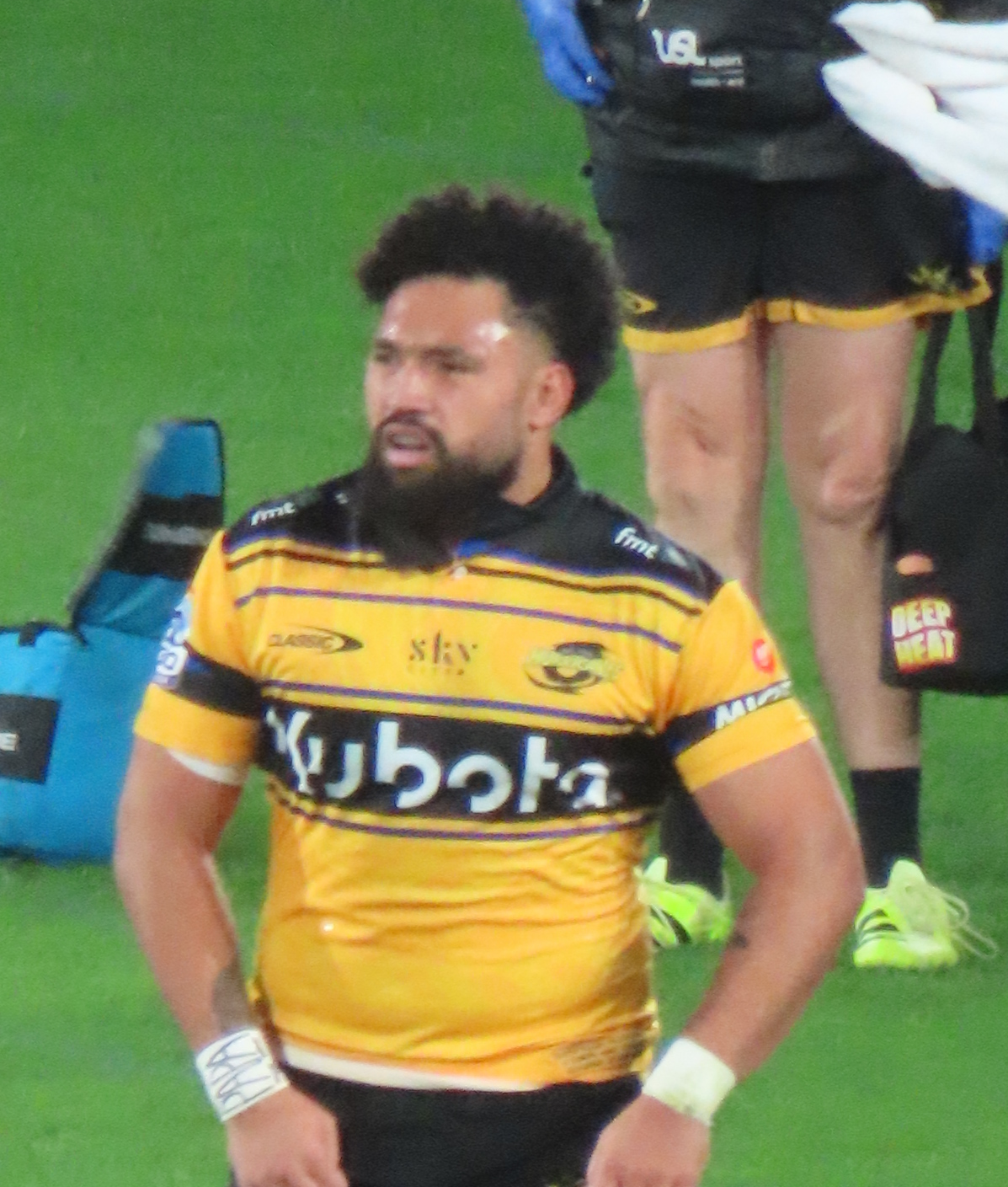
- Fineanganofo playing for the Hurricanes in the 2026 Super Rugby Pacific final
- Full name: Fatafehi F. Fineanganofo
- Born: 31 August 2002 (age 24) Auckland, New Zealand
- Height: 1.86 m (6 ft 1 in)
- Weight: 105 kg (231 lb)
- School: Auckland Grammar School

Rugby union career
- Position: Wing
- Current team: Bay of Plenty, Hurricanes
Senior career
Years	Team	Apps	(Points)
2023–2026	Bay of Plenty	24	(80)
2025–2027	Hurricanes	26	(115)
2027–	Newcastle Red Bulls	0	(0)
- Correct as of 1 July 2026
International career
Years	Team	Apps	(Points)
2026–	New Zealand	1	
- Correct as of 1 July 2026
National sevens team
Years	Team		Comps
2023–	New Zealand		
- Correct as of 21 July 2024

Fehi Fineanganofo (born 31 August 2002) is a New Zealand professional rugby union player, who currently plays as a wing for Bay of Plenty in New Zealand's domestic National Provincial Championship competition and the Hurricanes in Super Rugby. He has also played for the New Zealand national sevens team.

== Early life ==
As a youngster, Fineanganofo initially played rugby league. It was only when he attended Auckland Grammar School that he started playing rugby union.

== Senior career ==
Fineanganofo plays for Bay of Plenty in the National Provincial Championship. He was named in the Steamers' squad for the first time in 2023.

In November 2024, he signed a two-year contract with the Hurricanes ahead of the 2025 Super Rugby Pacific season.

On 19 January 2026, Fineanganofo would leave New Zealand to join ambitious English club Newcastle Red Bulls in the Premiership Rugby competition on a two-year deal ahead of the 2026–27 season.

In 2026, Fineanganofo formed part of the Hurricanes squad which won the 2026 Super Rugby Pacific season. On 20 June, the Hurricanes defeated the Chiefs 60–5 in the final. Fineanganofo scored one of the Hurricanes' nine tries. On 22 June 2026, he was named in the All Blacks squad for the first time.

== International career ==
In 2020, Fineanganofo was invited to attend a Barbarians Under 18 Development Camp, at the end of which he was named in the New Zealand Secondary Schools team. Due to the COVID-19 pandemic, this was only a paper team and it didn't play any games.

Fineanganofo made his debut for the New Zealand national sevens team in Los Angeles in 2023. He signed a full time contract with the team for the 2024 season. Described as New Zealand's "breakthrough star" of 2024, he played as New Zealand won the Singapore leg of the 2023–24 SVNS in May 2024.

He was selected for the 2024 Paris Olympics.
