= Asisipho Plaatjies =

South African rugby sevens player

- Born: 24 April 1996 (age 30)
- Height: 161 cm (5 ft 3 in)
- Weight: 66 kg (146 lb; 10 st 6 lb)

Rugby union career
National sevens team
| Years | Team | Comps |
| | South Africa | 19 |

Asisipho Plaatjies (born 24 April 1996) is a South African rugby sevens player.

== Career ==
Plaatjies competed for South Africa at the 2022 Commonwealth Games in Birmingham where they finished in seventh place. She was named in the Springbok women's sevens side for the 2023 Dubai Women's Sevens.
