= 2024 Hong Kong Sevens =

World Rugby Sevens Series tournaments

- 2023–24 SVNS
- Host nation: Hong Kong

Men
- Date: 5–7 April 2024
- Champion: New Zealand
- Runner-up: France
- Third: Ireland

Women
- Date: 5–7 April 2024
- Champion: New Zealand
- Runner-up: United States
- Third: Australia

Tournament details
- Matches played: 64

The 2024 Hong Kong Sevens or SVNS HKG was a rugby sevens tournament played at Hong Kong Stadium. Fifteen men's and women's teams participated. This was the last tournament at the iconic Hong Kong Stadium, as from 2025 the event will move to Kai Tak Sports Park. In addition to the SVNS tournament, there was also an invitational competition called the Melrose Claymores.

New Zealand won the men's event and their thirteenth title in Hong Kong, defeating France in the final. New Zealand also won the women's event, their twelfth title in Hong Kong, defeating the United States in the final.

== Men's tournament ==
=== Pool stage ===
Points system: Teams were awarded 3 points for a win, 2 points for a draw and 0 points for a loss. For a loss of 7 points or fewer teams were awarded 1 bonus point.

Key to colours in group tables
Teams that advanced to the cup quarterfinals
Teams that advanced to the 9th place semifinals

=== Pool A ===
Pos	Team	Pld	W	L	PF	PA	PD	BP	Pts
1	Australia	3	2	1	57	19	+38	1	7
2	France	3	2	1	57	28	+29	1	7
3	Fiji	3	2	1	59	24	+35	0	6
4	Canada	3	0	3	5	107	–102	0	0

5 April
17:30

Fiji	0–12	Australia

Hong Kong Stadium, Hong Kong

5 April
17:56

France	31–0	Canada

Hong Kong Stadium, Hong Kong

5 April
20:33

Fiji	45–5	Canada

Hong Kong Stadium, Hong Kong

5 April
20:56

France	19–14	Australia

Hong Kong Stadium, Hong Kong

6 April
13:20

Australia	31–0	Canada

Hong Kong Stadium, Hong Kong

6 April
13:43

France	7–14	Fiji

Hong Kong Stadium, Hong Kong

=== Pool B ===
Pos	Team	Pld	W	L	PF	PA	PD	BP	Pts
1	New Zealand	3	3	0	46	14	+32	0	9
2	United States	3	2	1	47	+36	11	1	7
3	Argentina	3	1	2	27	50	–23	1	4
4	Great Britain	3	0	3	35	55	–20	2	2

5 April
12:48

Argentina	10–14	United States

Hong Kong Stadium, Hong Kong

5 April
13:11

Great Britain	7–12	New Zealand

Hong Kong Stadium, Hong Kong

5 April
15:58

Argentina	0–22	New Zealand

Hong Kong Stadium, Hong Kong

5 April
16:21

Great Britain	14–26	United States

Hong Kong Stadium, Hong Kong

6 April
11:48

United States	7–12	New Zealand

Hong Kong Stadium, Hong Kong

6 April
12:11

Great Britain	14–17	Argentina

Hong Kong Stadium, Hong Kong

=== Pool C ===
Pos	Team	Pld	W	L	PF	PA	PD	BP	Pts
1	South Africa	3	3	0	72	34	+38	0	9
2	Ireland	3	2	1	41	34	+7	1	7
3	Spain	3	1	2	32	50	–18	1	4
4	Samoa	3	0	3	28	55	–27	2	2

5 April
11:16

Spain	17–14	Samoa

Hong Kong Stadium, Hong Kong

5 April
11:39

Ireland	17–22	South Africa

Hong Kong Stadium, Hong Kong

5 April
14:23

Spain	10–24	South Africa

Hong Kong Stadium, Hong Kong

5 April
14:49

Ireland	12–7	Samoa

Hong Kong Stadium, Hong Kong

6 April
10:16

Samoa	7–26	South Africa

Hong Kong Stadium, Hong Kong

6 April
11:39

Ireland	12–5	Spain

Hong Kong Stadium, Hong Kong

=== Melrose Claymores ===
Points system: Teams were awarded 3 points for a win, 2 points for a draw and 1 point for a loss. No bounus points were awarded.

Key to colours in Melrose Claymores Invitational table
Teams that advanced to the Melrose Claymores Final
Teams that are eliminated from the Melrose Claymores Invitational tournament

Melrose Claymores Invitational table
Pos	Team	Pld	W	D	L	PF	PA	PD	Pts
1	Japan	2	2	0	0	57	40	+17	6
2	Hong Kong	2	1	0	1	33	43	–10	3
3	China	2	0	0	2	43	50	–7	0

5 April
19:24

Hong Kong	19–17	China

Hong Kong Stadium, Hong Kong

6 April
15:11

Hong Kong	14–26	Japan

Hong Kong Stadium, Hong Kong

7 April
10:03

China	26–31	Japan

Hong Kong Stadium, Hong Kong

=== Melrose Claymores Final ===
7 April
15:56

Japan	12–22	Hong Kong

Hong Kong Stadium, Hong Kong

=== 9th to 12th playoffs ===
9th place semifinals
6 April 2024– 19:33 – Hong Kong Stadium
Great Britain	7
Samoa	12
6 April 2024– 19:56 – Hong Kong Stadium
Argentina	21
Canada	0

9th place final
7 April 2024– 11:40 – Hong Kong Stadium
Samoa	0
Argentina	42
11th place final
7 April 2024– 10:49 – Hong Kong Stadium
Great Britain	26
Canada	17

=== 5th to 8th playoffs ===
Key to colours in table
Teams that advanced to the 5th place final
Teams that advanced to the 7th place final

Team	Point Differential
Fiji	+28
South Africa	+23
United States	+6
Spain	–32

Fifth Place

7 April
15:00

Fiji	33–14	South Africa

Hong Kong Stadium, Hong Kong

Seventh Place

7 April
12:31

United States	19–17	Spain

Hong Kong Stadium, Hong Kong

=== Cup ===
Quarterfinals
6 April 2024– 17:09 – Hong Kong Stadium
United States	19
Ireland	24
6 April 2024– 17:35 – Hong Kong Stadium
France	24
Spain	10
6 April 2024– 18:01 – Hong Kong Stadium
South Africa	0
Australia	15
6 April 2024– 18:24 – Hong Kong Stadium
New Zealand	19
Fiji	12

Semifinals
7 April 2024– 13:40 – Hong Kong Stadium
Ireland	10
France	26
7 April 2024– 14:06 – Hong Kong Stadium
Australia	7
New Zealand	26

Final
7 April 2024– 18:53 – Hong Kong Stadium
France	7
New Zealand	10
3rd place final
7 April 2024– 17:40 – Hong Kong Stadium
Ireland	14
Australia	5

=== Final placings ===
Place	Team
1st place, gold medalist(s)	New Zealand
2nd place, silver medalist(s)	France
3rd place, bronze medalist(s)	Ireland
4	Australia
5	Fiji
6	South Africa
7	United States
8	Spain
9	Argentina
10	Samoa
11	Great Britain
12	Canada

=== Dream Team ===
Player	Country
Tepaea Cook-Savage	New Zealand
Maurice Longbottom	Australia
Zac Ward	Ireland
Aaron Grandidier	France
Antoine Zeghdar	France
Dylan Collier	New Zealand
Regan Ware	New Zealand

== Women's tournament ==
=== Pool stage ===
Points system: Teams were awarded 3 points for a win, 2 points for a draw and 0 points for a loss. For a loss of 7 points or fewer teams were awarded 1 bonus point.

Key to colours in group tables
Teams that advanced to the cup quarterfinals
Teams that advanced to the 9th place semifinals

=== Pool A ===
Pos	Team	Pld	W	L	PF	PA	PD	BP	Pts
1	France	3	3	0	86	45	+41	0	9
2	New Zealand	3	2	1	78	36	+42	1	7
3	Great Britain	3	1	2	29	70	–41	0	3
4	Brazil	3	0	3	36	78	–42	1	1

5 April
16:44

France	28–17	Brazil

Hong Kong Stadium, Hong Kong

5 April
17:07

New Zealand	24–5	Great Britain

Hong Kong Stadium, Hong Kong

5 April
19:47

France	34–7	Great Britain

Hong Kong Stadium, Hong Kong

5 April
20:10

New Zealand	33–7	Brazil

Hong Kong Stadium, Hong Kong

6 April
12:34

Brazil	12–17	Great Britain

Hong Kong Stadium, Hong Kong

6 April
12:57

New Zealand	21–24	France

Hong Kong Stadium, Hong Kong

=== Pool B ===
Pos	Team	Pld	W	L	PF	PA	PD	BP	Pts
1	Australia	3	3	0	82	12	+70	0	9
2	Fiji	3	2	1	57	31	+26	1	7
3	Ireland	3	1	2	25	63	–38	0	3
4	South Africa	3	0	3	14	72	–58	0	0

5 April
12:02

South Africa	7–20	Ireland

Hong Kong Stadium, Hong Kong

5 April
12:25

Australia	19–12	Fiji

Hong Kong Stadium, Hong Kong

5 April
15:12

South Africa	7–24	Fiji

Hong Kong Stadium, Hong Kong

5 April
15:35

Australia	35–0	Ireland

Hong Kong Stadium, Hong Kong

6 April
11:02

Ireland	5–21	Fiji

Hong Kong Stadium, Hong Kong

6 April
11:25

Australia	28–0	South Africa

Hong Kong Stadium, Hong Kong

=== Pool C ===
Pos	Team	Pld	W	L	PF	PA	PD	BP	Pts
1	Canada	3	3	0	50	17	+33	0	9
2	United States	3	2	1	46	29	+17	1	7
3	Japan	3	1	2	36	53	–17	1	4
4	Spain	3	0	3	24	57	–33	2	2

5 April
10:30

Canada	24–5	Japan

Hong Kong Stadium, Hong Kong

5 April
10:53

United States	24–5	Spain

Hong Kong Stadium, Hong Kong

5 April
13:34

Canada	14–7	Spain

Hong Kong Stadium, Hong Kong

5 April
13:57

United States	17–12	Japan

Hong Kong Stadium, Hong Kong

6 April
09:30

Japan	19–12	Spain

Hong Kong Stadium, Hong Kong

6 April
09:53

United States	5–12	Canada

Hong Kong Stadium, Hong Kong

=== Melrose Claymores ===
Points system: Teams were awarded 3 points for a win, 2 points for a draw and 1 point for a loss. No bounus points were awarded.

Key to colours in Melrose Claymores Invitational table
Teams that advanced to the Melrose Claymores Final
Teams that are eliminated from the Melrose Claymores Invitational tournament

Melrose Claymores Invitational table
Pos	Team	Pld	W	D	L	PF	PA	PD	Pts
1	Hong Kong	2	2	0	0	47	22	+21	6
2	China	2	1	0	1	36	19	+17	3
3	Thailand	2	0	0	2	10	52	–42	0

5 April
18:22

Hong Kong	19–12	China

Hong Kong Stadium, Hong Kong

6 April
14:09

Hong Kong	28–10	Thailand

Hong Kong Stadium, Hong Kong

7 April
09:40

China	24–0	Thailand

Hong Kong Stadium, Hong Kong

=== Melrose Claymores Final ===
7 April
15:28

Hong Kong	10–24	China

Hong Kong Stadium, Hong Kong

=== 9th to 12th playoffs ===
9th place semifinals
6 April 2024– 18:47 – Hong Kong Stadium
Spain	5
Brazil	12
6 April 2024– 19:10 – Hong Kong Stadium
Great Britain	15
South Africa	14

9th place final
7 April 2024– 11:12 – Hong Kong Stadium
Brazil	5
Great Britain	14
11th place final
7 April 2024– 10:26 – Hong Kong Stadium
Spain	17
South Africa	14

=== 5th to 8th playoffs ===
Key to colours in table
Teams that advanced to the 5th place final
Teams that advanced to the 7th place final

Team	Point Differential
Canada	+12
Fiji	0
Japan	–29
Ireland	–62

Fifth Place

7 April
14:32

Canada	15–19	Fiji

Hong Kong Stadium, Hong Kong

Seventh Place

7 April
12:08

Japan	12–5	Ireland

Hong Kong Stadium, Hong Kong

=== Cup ===
Quarterfinals
6 April 2024– 15:34 – Hong Kong Stadium
Fiji	7
United States	33
6 April 2024– 15:57 – Hong Kong Stadium
France	31
Ireland	7
6 April 2024– 16:20 – Hong Kong Stadium
Canada	5
New Zealand	26
6 April 2024– 16:43 – Hong Kong Stadium
Australia	12
Japan	0

Semifinals
7 April 2024– 12:54 – Hong Kong Stadium
United States	19
France	5
7 April 2024– 13:17 – Hong Kong Stadium
New Zealand	28
Australia	14

Final
7 April 2024– 18:13 – Hong Kong Stadium
United States	7
New Zealand	36
3rd place final
7 April 2024– 17:10 – Hong Kong Stadium
France	21
Australia	24

=== Final placings ===
Place	Team
1st place, gold medalist(s)	New Zealand
2nd place, silver medalist(s)	United States
3rd place, bronze medalist(s)	Australia
4	France
5	Fiji
6	Canada
7	Japan
8	Ireland
9	Great Britain
10	Brazil
11	Spain
12	South Africa

=== Dream Team ===
Player	Country
Alev Kelter	United States
Ilona Maher	United States
Yume Hirano	Japan
Michaela Blyde	New Zealand
Risi Pouri-Lane	New Zealand
Faith Nathan	Australia
Joanna Grisez	France

2023–24 SVNS
Preceded by 2024 USA Sevens	2024 Hong Kong Sevens	Succeeded by 2024 Singapore Sevens
