= 2024 Spain Sevens =

World Rugby Sevens Series tournaments

- 2023–24 SVNS
- Host nation: Spain

Men
- Date: 31 May–2 June 2024
- Champion: France
- Runner-up: Argentina
- Third: Fiji

Women
- Date: 31 May–2 June 2024
- Champion: Australia
- Runner-up: France
- Third: New Zealand

Tournament details
- Matches played: 72

2024 SVNS Grand Final

The 2024 Spain Sevens or SVNS MAD is a rugby sevens tournament played at Metropolitano Stadium in Madrid. Sixteen men's and women's teams participated, of which eight teams participated in the Grand Finals and the other teams participated in the Core Team Qualifier for core team status and to participate on the 2024–25 SVNS Series.

== Teams ==
The top eight-placed teams from the first seven previous events in the 2023–24 SVNS series played in a Grand Final event. The teams placed between nine–twelve competed in a promotion/relegation-style event with the top four teams from the men's and women's Challenger Series to decide which teams stay as core teams. Seeding of teams is in brackets. Teams were split into pools based on their seeding during the regular season and Challenger Series.

=== Men ===
| Grand Finals | Playoff |
|---|---|
| Argentina (1) | United States (9) |
| Ireland (2) | Spain (10) |
| New Zealand (3) | Samoa (11) |
| Australia (4) | Canada (12) |
| France (5) | Uruguay (CS1) |
| Fiji (6) | Kenya (CS2) |
| South Africa (7) | Chile (CS3) |
| Great Britain (8) | Germany (CS4) |

=== Women ===
| Grand Finals | Playoff |
|---|---|
| New Zealand (1) | Japan (9) |
| Australia (2) | Brazil (10) |
| France (3) | South Africa (11) |
| United States (4) | Spain (12) |
| Canada (5) | China (CS1) |
| Fiji (6) | Argentina (CS2) |
| Ireland (7) | Belgium (CS3) |
| Great Britain (8) | Poland (CS4) |

== Grand Finals — Men ==
=== Pool stage ===
Points system: Teams were awarded 3 points for a win, 2 points for a draw and 0 points for a loss. For a loss of 7 points or fewer teams were awarded 1 bonus point.

Key to colours in grand finals pool tables
| Teams that advanced to the Championship semifinals |
| Teams that advanced to the 5th place semifinals |

=== Pool A ===
| Pos | Team | Pld | W | L | PF | PA | PD | BP | Pts |
|---|---|---|---|---|---|---|---|---|---|
| 1 | Argentina | 3 | 3 | 0 | 71 | 22 | +49 | 0 | 9 |
| 2 | France | 3 | 2 | 1 | 67 | 43 | +24 | 0 | 6 |
| 3 | Australia | 3 | 1 | 2 | 29 | 66 | –37 | 0 | 3 |
| 4 | Great Britain | 3 | 0 | 3 | 31 | 67 | –36 | 2 | 2 |

31 May
19:05

| Australia | 5–38 | France |

Metropolitano Stadium, Madrid

31 May
19:28

| Argentina | 31–5 | Great Britain |

Metropolitano Stadium, Madrid

1 June
17:27

| Australia | 19–14 | Great Britain |

Metropolitano Stadium, Madrid

1 June
17:51

| Argentina | 26–12 | France |

Metropolitano Stadium, Madrid

1 June
20:55

| France | 17–12 (a.e.t.) | Great Britain |

Metropolitano Stadium, Madrid

1 June
21:17

| Argentina | 14–5 | Australia |

Metropolitano Stadium, Madrid

=== Pool B ===
| Pos | Team | Pld | W | L | PF | PA | PD | BP | Pts |
|---|---|---|---|---|---|---|---|---|---|
| 1 | Fiji | 3 | 3 | 0 | 80 | 54 | +26 | 0 | 9 |
| 2 | New Zealand | 3 | 2 | 1 | 81 | 69 | +12 | 1 | 7 |
| 3 | Ireland | 3 | 1 | 2 | 64 | 69 | –5 | 1 | 5 |
| 4 | South Africa | 3 | 0 | 3 | 52 | 85 | –33 | 1 | 1 |

31 May
14:14

| New Zealand | 26–28 | Fiji |

Metropolitano Stadium, Madrid

31 May
13:37

| Ireland | 26–21 | South Africa |

Metropolitano Stadium, Madrid

1 June
12:44

| New Zealand | 33–24 | South Africa |

Metropolitano Stadium, Madrid

1 June
13:06

| Ireland | 21–26 (a.e.t.) | Fiji |

Metropolitano Stadium, Madrid

1 June
15:49

| Fiji | 26–7 | South Africa |

Metropolitano Stadium, Madrid

1 June
16:11

| Ireland | 17–22 (a.e.t.) | New Zealand |

Metropolitano Stadium, Madrid

=== 5th to 8th playoffs ===
5th place semifinals
2 June 2024– 10:49 – Metropolitano Stadium
Ireland | 19
Great Britain | 14
2 June 2024– 11:11 – Metropolitano Stadium
Australia | 21
South Africa | 24

5th place final
2 June 2024– 14:29 – Metropolitano Stadium
Ireland | 12
South Africa | 7
7th place final
2 June 2024– 14:05 – Metropolitano Stadium
Great Britain | 0
Australia | 21

=== Championship ===
Championship semifinals
2 June 2024– 12:21 – Metropolitano Stadium
Fiji | 14
France | 21
2 June 2024– 12:45 – Metropolitano Stadium
Argentina | 21
New Zealand | 14

Championship final
2 June 2024– 20:26 – Metropolitano Stadium
France | 19
Argentina | 5
Bronze final
2 June 2024– 19:18 – Metropolitano Stadium
Fiji | 17
New Zealand | 10

=== Final placings ===
| Place | Team | Notes |
|---|---|---|
| 1st place, gold medalist(s) | France | Grand Final winners |
| 2nd place, silver medalist(s) | Argentina | |
| 3rd place, bronze medalist(s) | Fiji | |
| 4 | New Zealand | |
| 5 | Ireland | |
| 6 | South Africa | |
| 7 | Australia | |
| 8 | Great Britain | |

== Grand Finals — Women ==
=== Pool stage ===
Points system: Teams were awarded 3 points for a win, 2 points for a draw and 0 points for a loss. For a loss of 7 points or fewer teams were awarded 1 bonus point.

Key to colours in grand finals pool tables
| Teams that advanced to the Championship semifinals |
| Teams that advanced to the 5th place semifinals |

=== Pool A ===
| Pos | Team | Pld | W | L | PF | PA | PD | BP | Pts |
|---|---|---|---|---|---|---|---|---|---|
| 1 | Canada | 3 | 2 | 1 | 67 | 60 | +7 | 1 | 7 |
| 2 | New Zealand | 3 | 2 | 1 | 104 | 45 | +59 | 0 | 6 |
| 3 | United States | 3 | 2 | 1 | 45 | 69 | –24 | 0 | 6 |
| 4 | Great Britain | 3 | 0 | 3 | 43 | 85 | –42 | 2 | 2 |

31 May
18:19

| United States | 26–19 | Canada |

Metropolitano Stadium, Madrid

31 May
18:42

| New Zealand | 49–14 | Great Britain |

Metropolitano Stadium, Madrid

1 June
16:39

| United States | 14–12 | Great Britain |

Metropolitano Stadium, Madrid

1 June
17:03

| New Zealand | 17–26 | Canada |

Metropolitano Stadium, Madrid

1 June
20:11

| Canada | 22–17 (a.e.t.) | Great Britain |

Metropolitano Stadium, Madrid

1 June
20:33

| New Zealand | 38–5 | United States |

Metropolitano Stadium, Madrid

=== Pool B ===
| Pos | Team | Pld | W | L | PF | PA | PD | BP | Pts |
|---|---|---|---|---|---|---|---|---|---|
| 1 | Australia | 3 | 3 | 0 | 92 | 40 | +52 | 0 | 9 |
| 2 | France | 3 | 2 | 1 | 81 | 40 | +41 | 0 | 6 |
| 3 | Ireland | 3 | 1 | 2 | 45 | 83 | –38 | 0 | 3 |
| 4 | Fiji | 3 | 0 | 3 | 36 | 95 | –55 | 0 | 0 |

31 May
13:28

| France | 36–7 | Fiji |

Metropolitano Stadium, Madrid

31 May
13:51

| Australia | 33–14 | Ireland |

Metropolitano Stadium, Madrid

1 June
12:00

| France | 31–5 | Ireland |

Metropolitano Stadium, Madrid

1 June
12:22

| Australia | 31–12 | Fiji |

Metropolitano Stadium, Madrid

1 June
15:05

| Fiji | 19–26 | Ireland |

Metropolitano Stadium, Madrid

1 June
15:27

| Australia | 28–14 | France |

Metropolitano Stadium, Madrid

=== 5th to 8th playoffs ===
5th place semifinals
2 June 2024– 10:05 – Metropolitano Stadium
Ireland | 20
Great Britain | 0
2 June 2024– 10:27 – Metropolitano Stadium
United States | 31
Fiji | 0

5th place final
2 June 2024– 13:41 – Metropolitano Stadium
Ireland | 14
United States | 27
7th place final
2 June 2024– 13:17 – Metropolitano Stadium
Great Britain | 7
Fiji | 42

=== Championship ===
Championship semifinals
2 June 2024– 11:33 – Metropolitano Stadium
Australia | 21
New Zealand | 19
2 June 2024– 11:57 – Metropolitano Stadium
Canada | 17
France | 19

Championship final
2 June 2024– 19:49 – Metropolitano Stadium
Australia | 26
France | 7
Bronze final
2 June 2024– 18:52 – Metropolitano Stadium
New Zealand | 26
Canada | 14

=== Final placings ===
| Place | Team | Notes |
|---|---|---|
| 1st place, gold medalist(s) | Australia | Grand Final winners |
| 2nd place, silver medalist(s) | France | |
| 3rd place, bronze medalist(s) | New Zealand | |
| 4 | Canada | |
| 5 | United States | |
| 6 | Ireland | |
| 7 | Fiji | |
| 8 | Great Britain | |

== Playoffs — Men ==
=== Pool stage ===
Points system: Teams were awarded 3 points for a win, 2 points for a draw and 0 points for a loss. For a loss of 7 points or fewer teams were awarded 1 bonus point.

=== Pool A ===
| Pos | Team | Pld | W | L | PF | PA | PD | BP | Pts |
|---|---|---|---|---|---|---|---|---|---|
| 1 | United States | 3 | 3 | 0 | 83 | 40 | +43 | 0 | 9 |
| 2 | Uruguay | 3 | 2 | 1 | 81 | 50 | +31 | 0 | 6 |
| 3 | Germany | 3 | 1 | 2 | 52 | 70 | –28 | 0 | 3 |
| 4 | Canada | 3 | 0 | 3 | 28 | 74 | –46 | 2 | 2 |

31 May
12:44

| Canada | 7–41 | Uruguay |

Metropolitano Stadium, Madrid

31 May
13:06

| United States | 40–19 | Germany |

Metropolitano Stadium, Madrid

31 May
15:50

| Canada | 14–19 | Germany |

Metropolitano Stadium, Madrid

31 May
16:12

| United States | 29–14 | Uruguay |

Metropolitano Stadium, Madrid

1 June
14:14

| Uruguay | 26–14 | Germany |

Metropolitano Stadium, Madrid

1 June
14:37

| United States | 14–7 | Canada |

Metropolitano Stadium, Madrid

=== Pool B ===
| Pos | Team | Pld | W | L | PF | PA | PD | BP | Pts |
|---|---|---|---|---|---|---|---|---|---|
| 1 | Spain | 3 | 3 | 0 | 70 | 17 | +53 | 0 | 9 |
| 2 | Kenya | 3 | 2 | 1 | 60 | 29 | +31 | 1 | 7 |
| 3 | Chile | 3 | 1 | 2 | 40 | 84 | –44 | 0 | 3 |
| 4 | Samoa | 3 | 0 | 3 | 31 | 71 | –40 | 2 | 2 |

31 May
17:25

| Samoa | 12–19 | Kenya |

Metropolitano Stadium, Madrid

31 May
17:49

| Spain | 29–12 | Chile |

Metropolitano Stadium, Madrid

31 May
20:54

| Samoa | 19–21 | Chile |

Metropolitano Stadium, Madrid

31 May
21:18

| Spain | 10–5 | Kenya |

Metropolitano Stadium, Madrid

1 June
19:18

| Kenya | 36–7 | Chile |

Metropolitano Stadium, Madrid

1 June
19:42

| Spain | 31–0 | Samoa |

Metropolitano Stadium, Madrid

=== Qualifier Playoffs ===
2 June
16:56

| United States | 40–19 | Samoa |

Metropolitano Stadium, Madrid

2 June
17:20

| Germany | 15–33 | Kenya |

Metropolitano Stadium, Madrid

2 June
17:44

| Uruguay | 12–10 | Chile |

Metropolitano Stadium, Madrid

2 June
18:08

| Canada | 14–22 | Spain |

Metropolitano Stadium, Madrid

=== Final placings ===
| Team | Notes |
|---|---|
| United States | Qualified for SVNS 2024–25 |
| Kenya | Qualified for SVNS 2024–25 |
| Uruguay | Qualified for SVNS 2024–25 |
| Spain | Qualified for SVNS 2024–25 |
| Canada | Relegated for SVNS 2024–25 |
| Samoa | Relegated for SVNS 2024–25 |
| Germany | |
| Chile | |

== Playoffs — Women ==
=== Pool stage ===
Points system: Teams were awarded 3 points for a win, 2 points for a draw and 0 points for a loss. For a loss of 7 points or fewer teams were awarded 1 bonus point.

=== Pool A ===
| Pos | Team | Pld | W | L | PF | PA | PD | BP | Pts |
|---|---|---|---|---|---|---|---|---|---|
| 1 | China | 3 | 3 | 0 | 69 | 21 | +48 | 0 | 9 |
| 2 | Japan | 3 | 2 | 1 | 72 | 31 | +41 | 1 | 7 |
| 3 | Spain | 3 | 1 | 2 | 66 | 38 | +28 | 1 | 4 |
| 4 | Poland | 3 | 0 | 3 | 0 | 112 | –112 | 0 | 0 |

31 May
16:49

| Spain | 7–12 | China |

Metropolitano Stadium, Madrid

31 May
17:01

| Japan | 32–0 | Poland |

Metropolitano Stadium, Madrid

31 May
20:06

| Spain | 45–0 | Poland |

Metropolitano Stadium, Madrid

31 May
20:30

| Japan | 14–17 | China |

Metropolitano Stadium, Madrid

1 June
18:30

| China | 40–0 | Poland |

Metropolitano Stadium, Madrid

1 June
18:54

| Japan | 26–14 | Spain |

Metropolitano Stadium, Madrid

=== Pool B ===
| Pos | Team | Pld | W | L | PF | PA | PD | BP | Pts |
|---|---|---|---|---|---|---|---|---|---|
| 1 | Brazil | 3 | 3 | 0 | 100 | 17 | +83 | 0 | 9 |
| 2 | South Africa | 3 | 2 | 1 | 64 | 38 | +26 | 0 | 6 |
| 3 | Argentina | 3 | 1 | 2 | 38 | 69 | –31 | 0 | 3 |
| 4 | Belgium | 3 | 0 | 3 | 26 | 104 | –78 | 1 | 1 |

31 May
12:00

| South Africa | 24–7 | Argentina |

Metropolitano Stadium, Madrid

31 May
12:22

| Brazil | 45–5 | Belgium |

Metropolitano Stadium, Madrid

31 May
15:06

| South Africa | 40–7 | Belgium |

Metropolitano Stadium, Madrid

31 May
15:28

| Brazil | 31–12 | Argentina |

Metropolitano Stadium, Madrid

1 June
13:28

| Argentina | 19–14 | Belgium |

Metropolitano Stadium, Madrid

1 June
13:51

| Brazil | 24–0 | South Africa |

Metropolitano Stadium, Madrid

=== Qualifier Playoffs ===
2 June
15:08

| China | 33–0 | Belgium |

Metropolitano Stadium, Madrid

2 June
15:32

| Spain | 22–0 | South Africa |

Metropolitano Stadium, Madrid

2 June
13:56

| Japan | 26–12 | Argentina |

Metropolitano Stadium, Madrid

2 June
16:20

| Poland | 7–38 | Brazil |

Metropolitano Stadium, Madrid

=== Final placings ===
| Team | Notes |
|---|---|
| China | Qualified for SVNS 2024–25 |
| Spain | Qualified for SVNS 2024–25 |
| Japan | Qualified for SVNS 2024–25 |
| Brazil | Qualified for SVNS 2024–25 |
| South Africa | Relegated for SVNS 2024–25 |
| Belgium | |
| Argentina | |
| Poland | |

== Dream Teams ==
=== Men ===
| Player | Country |
|---|---|
| Juan Ramos | Spain |
| Vincent Onyala | Kenya |
| Matteo Graziano | Argentina |
| Antoine Dupont | France |
| Rayan Rebbadj | France |
| Jerry Tuwai | Fiji |
| Ponipate Loganimasi | Fiji |

=== Women ===
| Player | Country |
|---|---|
| Jorja Miller | New Zealand |
| Maddison Levi | Australia |
| Olivia Apps | Canada |
| Juana Stella | Spain |
| Chiharu Nakamura | Japan |
| Keyara Wardley | Canada |
| Alycia Chrystiaens | France |

2023–24 SVNS
| Preceded by 2024 Singapore Sevens | 2024 Spain Sevens | Succeeded by None (last event) |
