= 2024 Singapore Sevens =

World Rugby Sevens Series tournaments

- 2023–24 SVNS
- Host nation: Singapore

Men
- Date: 3–5 May 2024
- Champion: New Zealand
- Runner-up: Ireland
- Third: Great Britain

Women
- Date: 3–5 May 2024
- Champion: New Zealand
- Runner-up: Australia
- Third: France

Tournament details
- Matches played: 64

The 2024 Singapore Sevens or SVNS SGP was a rugby sevens tournament played at Singapore National Stadium. Twelve men's and women's teams participated.

The 2024 Singapore Sevens marks the first Singapore Sevens Women's tournament.

== Men's tournament ==
=== Pool stage ===
Points system: Teams were awarded 3 points for a win, 2 points for a draw and 0 points for a loss. For a loss of 7 points or fewer teams were awarded 1 bonus point.

Key to colours in pool tables
Teams that advanced to the cup quarterfinals
Teams that advanced to the 9th place semifinals

=== Pool A ===
Pos	Team	Pld	W	L	PF	PA	PD	BP	Pts
1	Argentina	3	2	1	90	31	+59	1	7
2	Australia	3	2	1	57	59	–2	0	6
3	New Zealand	3	2	1	53	60	–7	0	6
4	Canada	3	0	3	31	81	–50	2	2

3 May
14:42

Australia	26–19	Argentina

National Stadium, Singapore

3 May
15:04

New Zealand	22–17 (a.e.t.)	Canada

National Stadium, Singapore

3 May
20:14

Australia	21–14	Canada

National Stadium, Singapore

3 May
20:32

New Zealand	5–33	Argentina

National Stadium, Singapore

4 May
14:48

Argentina	38–0	Canada

National Stadium, Singapore

4 May
15:12

New Zealand	26–10	Australia

National Stadium, Singapore

=== Pool B ===
Pos	Team	Pld	W	L	PF	PA	PD	BP	Pts
1	South Africa	3	3	0	66	36	+30	0	9
2	France	3	2	1	53	32	+21	0	6
3	Spain	3	1	2	59	53	+6	1	4
4	Samoa	3	0	3	15	72	–57	1	1

3 May
13:58

South Africa	31–7	Spain

National Stadium, Singapore

3 May
14:20

France	17–0	Samoa

National Stadium, Singapore

3 May
19:18

South Africa	15-10	Samoa

National Stadium, Singapore

3 May
19:50

France	17-12	Spain

National Stadium, Singapore

4 May
13:59

Spain	40-5	Samoa

National Stadium, Singapore

4 May
14:24

France	19-20	South Africa

National Stadium, Singapore

=== Pool C ===
Pos	Team	Pld	W	L	PF	PA	PD	BP	Pts
1	United States	3	2	1	62	42	+20	1	7
2	Great Britain	3	2	1	45	52	–7	0	6
3	Ireland	3	1	2	45	41	+4	2	5
4	Fiji	3	1	2	54	71	–17	1	4

3 May
13:14

Fiji	14–33	United States

National Stadium, Singapore

3 May
13:36

Ireland	19–5	Great Britain

National Stadium, Singapore

3 May
18:30

Fiji	14–19	Great Britain

National Stadium, Singapore

3 May
18:54

Ireland	7–10	United States

National Stadium, Singapore

4 May
13:15

United States	19–21	Great Britain

National Stadium, Singapore

4 May
13:37

Ireland	19–26	Fiji

National Stadium, Singapore

=== 9th to 12th playoffs ===
9th place semifinals
4 May 2024– 18:04 – National Stadium
Fiji	31
Canada	7
4 May 2024– 18:26 – National Stadium
Spain	19
Samoa	12

9th place final
5 May 2024– 12:36 – National Stadium
Fiji	21
Spain	12
11th place final
5 May 2024– 11:52 – National Stadium
Canada	12
Samoa	17

=== 5th to 8th playoffs ===
Key to colours in table
Teams that advanced to the 5th place final
Teams that advanced to the 7th place final

Team	Points Difference
Argentina	+43
South Africa	+25
United States	+15
France	–7

Fifth Place

5 May
15:55

Argentina	14–10	South Africa

National Stadium, Singapore

Seventh Place

5 May
15:06

United States	19–17	France

National Stadium, Singapore

=== Cup ===
Quarterfinals
4 May 2024– 19:00 – National Stadium
France	7
Great Britain	35
4 May 2024– 19:24 – National Stadium
Argentina	5
Ireland	21
4 May 2024– 19:48 – National Stadium
United States	14
New Zealand	19
4 May 2024– 20:12 – National Stadium
South Africa	24
Australia	29 (a.e.t.)

Semifinals
5 May 2024– 13:48 – National Stadium
Great Britain	12
Ireland	15 (a.e.t.)
5 May 2024– 14:12 – National Stadium
New Zealand	28
Australia	12

Final
5 May 2024– 18:21 – National Stadium
Ireland	14
New Zealand	17
3rd place final
5 May 2024– 17:08 – National Stadium
Great Britain	26
Australia	7

=== Final placings ===
Place	Team
1st place, gold medalist(s)	New Zealand
2nd place, silver medalist(s)	Ireland
3rd place, bronze medalist(s)	Great Britain
4	Australia
5	Argentina
6	South Africa
7	United States
8	France
9	Fiji
10	Spain
11	Samoa
12	Canada

=== Dream Team ===
Player	Country
Robbie Fergusson	Great Britain
Terry Kennedy	Ireland
Fehi Fineanganofo	New Zealand
Kitiona Vai	New Zealand
Harry McNulty	Ireland
Kaleem Barreto	Great Britain
Rodrigo Isgró	Argentina

== Women's tournament ==
=== Pool stage ===
Points system: Teams were awarded 3 points for a win, 2 points for a draw and 0 points for a loss. For a loss of 7 points or fewer teams were awarded 1 bonus point.

Key to colours in pool tables
Teams that advanced to the cup quarterfinals
Teams that advanced to the 9th place semifinals

=== Pool A ===
Pos	Team	Pld	W	L	PF	PA	PD	BP	Pts
1	New Zealand	3	3	0	100	26	+74	0	9
2	Ireland	3	2	1	42	38	+4	0	6
3	Canada	3	1	2	35	43	–8	1	4
4	Spain	3	0	3	21	91	–70	0	0

3 May
11:44

Canada	0–5	Ireland

National Stadium, Singapore

3 May
12:06

New Zealand	38–7	Spain

National Stadium, Singapore

3 May
16:54

Canada	28–7	Spain

National Stadium, Singapore

3 May
17:21

New Zealand	31–12	Ireland

National Stadium, Singapore

4 May
11:44

Ireland	25–7	Spain

National Stadium, Singapore

4 May
12:06

New Zealand	31–7	Canada

National Stadium, Singapore

=== Pool B ===
Pos	Team	Pld	W	L	PF	PA	PD	BP	Pts
1	France	3	3	0	109	22	+87	0	9
2	Japan	3	2	1	63	60	+3	0	6
3	South Africa	3	1	2	21	95	–74	0	3
4	United States	3	0	3	39	55	–16	2	2

3 May
11:00

France	41–7	Japan

National Stadium, Singapore

3 May
11:22

United States	12–14	South Africa

National Stadium, Singapore

3 May
16:10

France	49–0	South Africa

National Stadium, Singapore

3 May
16:32

United States	12–22	Japan

National Stadium, Singapore

4 May
11:00

Japan	34–7	South Africa

National Stadium, Singapore

4 May
11:22

United States	15–19	France

National Stadium, Singapore

=== Pool C ===
Pos	Team	Pld	W	L	PF	PA	PD	BP	Pts
1	Australia	3	3	0	131	10	+121	0	9
2	Fiji	3	2	1	53	77	–24	0	6
3	Great Britain	3	1	2	45	73	–28	0	3
4	Brazil	3	0	3	22	91	–69	0	0

3 May
12:28

Fiji	24–10	Great Britain

National Stadium, Singapore

3 May
12:50

Australia	27–10	Brazil

National Stadium, Singapore

3 May
17:43

Fiji	29–7	Brazil

National Stadium, Singapore

3 May
18:05

Australia	44–0	Great Britain

National Stadium, Singapore

4 May
12:28

Great Britain	35–5	Brazil

National Stadium, Singapore

4 May
12:50

Australia	60–0	Fiji

National Stadium, Singapore

=== 9th to 12th playoffs ===
9th place semifinals
4 May 2024– 15:41 – National Stadium
United States	33
Brazil	0
4 May 2024– 16:03 – National Stadium
South Africa	26
Spain	14

9th place final
5 May 2024– 12:14 – National Stadium
United States	0
South Africa	5
11th place final
5 May 2024– 11:30 – National Stadium
Brazil	19
Spain	24

=== 5th to 8th playoffs ===
Key to colours in table
Teams that advanced to the 5th place final
Teams that advanced to the 7th place final

Team	Points Difference
Japan	+1
Ireland	–6
Canada	–32
Great Britain	–47

Fifth Place

5 May
15:33

Japan	17–19	Ireland

National Stadium, Singapore

Seventh Place

5 May
14:44

Canada	17–5	Great Britain

National Stadium, Singapore

=== Cup ===
Quarterfinals
4 May 2024– 16:27 – National Stadium
Japan	10
Fiji	12
4 May 2024– 16:49 – National Stadium
New Zealand	24
Great Britain	5
4 May 2024– 17:16 – National Stadium
Australia	24
Ireland	14
4 May 2024– 17:40 – National Stadium
France	24
Canada	0

Semifinals
5 May 2024– 13:02 – National Stadium
Fiji	22
New Zealand	33
5 May 2024– 13:24 – National Stadium
Australia	19
France	12

Final
5 May 2024– 17:41 – National Stadium
New Zealand	31
Australia	21
3rd place final
5 May 2024– 16:38 – National Stadium
Fiji	7
France	29

=== Final placings ===
Place	Team
1st place, gold medalist(s)	New Zealand
2nd place, silver medalist(s)	Australia
3rd place, bronze medalist(s)	France
4	Fiji
5	Ireland
6	Japan
7	Canada
8	Great Britain
9	South Africa
10	United States
11	Spain
12	Brazil

=== Dream Team ===
Player	Country
Chiharu Nakamura	Japan
Tysha Ikenasio	New Zealand
Raijieli Daveua	Fiji
Jorja Miller	New Zealand
Séraphine Okemba	France
Faith Nathan	Australia
Madison Ashby	Australia

2023–24 SVNS
Preceded by 2024 Hong Kong Sevens	2024 Singapore Sevens	Succeeded by 2024 Spain Sevens
