= 2024 Australia Sevens =

World Rugby Sevens Series tournaments

- 2023–24 SVNS
- Host nation: Australia

Men
- Date: 26–28 January 2024
- Champion: Argentina
- Runner-up: Australia
- Third: Ireland

Women
- Date: 26–28 January 2024
- Champion: Ireland
- Runner-up: Australia
- Third: Great Britain

Tournament details
- Matches played: 64

The 2024 Australia Sevens or SVNS PER is a rugby sevens tournament played at HBF Park. Twelve men's and women's teams participated.

Argentina won the men's event and their first title in Australia, defeating Australia in the final. Ireland won the women's event and their first ever title in their history, defeating Australia in the final.

== Men's tournament ==
=== Pool stage ===
Points system: Teams were awarded 3 points for a win, 2 points for a draw and 0 points for a loss. For a loss of 7 points or fewer teams were awarded 1 bonus point.

Key to colours in pool tables
Teams that advanced to the cup quarterfinals
Teams that advanced to the 9th place semifinals

=== Pool A ===
Pos	Team	Pld	W	L	PF	PA	PD	BP	Pts
1	Argentina	3	3	0	76	15	+61	0	9
2	South Africa	3	2	1	50	40	+10	0	6
3	Spain	3	1	2	52	61	–9	1	4
4	Canada	3	0	3	24	86	–62	0	0

26 January
12:44

South Africa	24–7	Canada

HBF Park, Perth

26 January
13:06

Argentina	28–5	Spain

HBF Park, Perth

26 January
18:22

South Africa	21–14	Spain

HBF Park, Perth

26 January
18:45

Argentina	29–5	Canada

HBF Park, Perth

27 January
12:16

Canada	12–33	Spain

HBF Park, Perth

27 January
12:38

Argentina	19–5	South Africa

HBF Park, Perth

=== Pool B ===
Pos	Team	Pld	W	L	PF	PA	PD	BP	Pts
1	United States	3	3	0	62	31	+31	0	9
2	Ireland	3	2	1	43	48	–5	0	6
3	Australia	3	1	2	50	52	–2	1	4
4	Great Britain	3	0	3	36	60	–24	2	2

26 January
15:51

Ireland	17–12	Great Britain

HBF Park, Perth

26 January
16:14

Australia	14–19	United States

HBF Park, Perth

26 January
20:50

Ireland	7–26	United States

HBF Park, Perth

26 January
21:13

Great Britain	14–26	Australia

HBF Park, Perth

27 January
13:48

Great Britain	10–17	United States

HBF Park, Perth

27 January
14:11

Australia	10–19	Ireland

HBF Park, Perth

=== Pool C ===
Pos	Team	Pld	W	L	PF	PA	PD	BP	Pts
1	Fiji	3	3	0	61	42	+19	0	9
2	France	3	2	1	73	57	+16	1	7
3	New Zealand	3	1	2	48	66	–18	1	4
4	Samoa	3	0	3	33	50	–17	3	3

26 January
14:16

New Zealand	17–33	France

HBF Park, Perth

26 January
14:38

Fiji	14–7	Samoa

HBF Park, Perth

26 January
19:08

New Zealand	17–12	Samoa

HBF Park, Perth

26 January
19:31

Fiji	26–21	France

HBF Park, Perth

27 January
13:02

France	19–14	Samoa

HBF Park, Perth

27 January
13:25

New Zealand	14–21	Fiji

HBF Park, Perth

=== 9th to 12th playoffs ===
9th place semifinals
27 January 2024– 17:05 – HBF Park
Samoa	24
Great Britain	19
27 January 2024– 17:30 – HBF Park
New Zealand	26
Canada	21

9th place final
28 January 2024–11:54 – HBF Park
Samoa	14
New Zealand	21
11th place final
28 January 2024– 11:08 – HBF Park
Great Britain	17
Canada	5

=== 5th to 8th playoffs ===
Key to colours in table
Teams that advanced to the 5th place final
Teams that advanced to the 7th place final

Team	Points difference
France	+9
South Africa	+8
United States	–7
Spain	–20

Fifth place

28 January
15:24

France	5–24	South Africa

HBF Park, Perth

Seventh place

28 January
14:38

United States	27–12	Spain

HBF Park, Perth

=== Cup ===
Quarterfinals
27 January 2024– 18:10 – HBF Park
Ireland	21
France	14
27 January 2024– 18:35 – HBF Park
Argentina	28
Spain	17
27 January 2024– 19:00 – HBF Park
Fiji	14
South Africa	12
27 January 2024– 19:25 – HBF Park
United States	7
Australia	31

Semifinals
28 January 2024– 13:10 – HBF Park
Ireland	5
Argentina	24
28 January 2024– 13:34 – HBF Park
Fiji	7
Australia	22

Final
28 January 2024– 17:53 – HBF Park
Argentina	31
Australia	5
3rd place final
28 January 2024– 16:40 – HBF Park
Ireland	24
Fiji	7

=== Final placings ===
Place	Team
1st place, gold medalist(s)	Argentina
2nd place, silver medalist(s)	Australia
3rd place, bronze medalist(s)	Ireland
4	Fiji
5	South Africa
6	France
7	United States
8	Spain
9	New Zealand
10	Samoa
11	Great Britain
12	Canada

=== Dream Team ===
Player	Country
Terry Kennedy	Ireland
Maurice Longbottom	Australia
Nathan Lawson	Australia
Nick Malouf	Australia
Marcos Moneta	Argentina
Rodrigo Isgro	Argentina
Kaminieli Rasaku	Fiji

== Women's tournament ==
=== Pool stage ===
Points system: Teams were awarded 3 points for a win, 2 points for a draw and 0 points for a loss. For a loss of 7 points or fewer teams were awarded 1 bonus point.

Key to colours in pool tables
Teams that advanced to the cup quarterfinals
Teams that advanced to the 9th place semifinals

=== Pool A ===
Pos	Team	Pld	W	L	PF	PA	PD	BP	Pts
1	Australia	3	2	1	74	33	+41	1	7
2	Great Britain	3	2	1	45	+38	7	1	7
3	Canada	3	1	2	52	52	0	1	4
4	South Africa	3	1	2	21	69	–48	0	3

26 January
15:05

Canada	12–14	Great Britain

HBF Park, Perth

26 January
15:28

Australia	31–0	South Africa

HBF Park, Perth

26 January
20:04

Canada	26–7	South Africa

HBF Park, Perth

26 January
20:27

Australia	12–19	Great Britain

HBF Park, Perth

27 January
11:32

Great Britain	12–14	South Africa

HBF Park, Perth

27 January
11:54

Australia	31–14	Canada

HBF Park, Perth

=== Pool B ===
Pos	Team	Pld	W	L	PF	PA	PD	BP	Pts
1	France	3	3	0	88	31	+57	0	9
2	Fiji	3	2	1	83	46	+37	0	6
3	Brazil	3	1	2	41	81	–40	0	3
4	Spain	3	0	3	15	69	–54	1	1

26 January
12:00

Fiji	40–15	Brazil

HBF Park, Perth

26 January
12:22

France	26–5	Spain

HBF Park, Perth

26 January
16:47

Fiji	31–0	Spain

HBF Park, Perth

26 January
17:10

France	31–14	Brazil

HBF Park, Perth

27 January
10:00

Brazil	12–10	Spain

HBF Park, Perth

27 January
10:22

France	31–12	Fiji

HBF Park, Perth

=== Pool C ===
Pos	Team	Pld	W	L	PF	PA	PD	BP	Pts
1	New Zealand	3	3	0	74	26	+48	0	9
2	Ireland	3	2	1	59	42	+17	1	7
3	United States	3	1	2	54	48	+6	1	4
4	Japan	3	0	3	17	88	–71	0	0

26 January
13:32

United States	14–19	Ireland

HBF Park, Perth

26 January
13:54

New Zealand	29–5	Japan

HBF Park, Perth

26 January
17:33

United States	33–5	Japan

HBF Park, Perth

26 January
17:56

New Zealand	21–14	Ireland

HBF Park, Perth

27 January
10:44

Ireland	26–7	Japan

HBF Park, Perth

27 January
11:06

New Zealand	24–7	United States

HBF Park, Perth

=== 9th to 12th playoffs ===
9th place semifinals
27 January 2024– 14:42 – HBF Park
South Africa	12
Spain	7
27 January 2024– 15:04 – HBF Park
Brazil	21
Japan	17

9th place final
28 January 2024– 11:31 – HBF Park
South Africa	0
Brazil	7
11th place final
28 January 2024– 10:45 – HBF Park
Spain	5
Japan	33

=== 5th to 8th playoffs ===
Key to colours in table
Teams that advanced to the 5th place final
Teams that advanced to the 7th place final

Team	Points difference
France	+41
New Zealand	+38
Fiji	+35
Canada	–7

Fifth place

28 January
15:01

France	10–14	New Zealand

HBF Park, Perth

Seventh place

28 January
14:15

Fiji	5–26	Canada

HBF Park, Perth

=== Cup ===
Quarterfinals
27 January 2024– 15:26 – HBF Park
Fiji	12
Ireland	14
27 January 2024– 15:48 – HBF Park
Great Britain	7
Canada	0
27 January 2024– 16:15 – HBF Park
New Zealand	14
Australia	24
27 January 2024– 16:40 – HBF Park
France	5
United States	21

Semifinals
28 January 2024– 12:22 – HBF Park
Ireland	31
Great Britain	7
28 January 2024– 12:46 – HBF Park
Australia	24
United States	7

Final
28 January 2024– 17:13 – HBF Park
Ireland	19
Australia	14
3rd place final
28 January 2024– 16:10 – HBF Park
Great Britain	24
United States	10

=== Final placings ===
Place	Team
1st place, gold medalist(s)	Ireland
2nd place, silver medalist(s)	Australia
3rd place, bronze medalist(s)	Great Britain
4	United States
5	New Zealand
6	France
7	Canada
8	Fiji
9	Brazil
10	South Africa
11	Japan
12	Spain

=== Dream Team ===
Player	Country
Amee-Leigh Murphy Crowe	Ireland
Lucy Mulhall	Ireland
Bienne Terita	Australia
Alysia Lefau-Fakaosilea	Australia
Ellie Boatman	Great Britain
Kristi Kirshe	United States
Krissy Scurfield	Canada

2023–24 SVNS
Preceded by 2023 South Africa Sevens	2024 Australia Sevens	Succeeded by 2024 Canada Sevens
