= 2024 USA Sevens =

World Rugby Sevens Series tournaments

- 2023–24 SVNS
- Host nation: United States

Men
- Date: March 1–3, 2024
- Champion: France
- Runner-up: Great Britain
- Third: Ireland

Women
- Date: March 1–3, 2024
- Champion: New Zealand
- Runner-up: Australia
- Third: United States

Tournament details
- Matches played: 64

The 2024 USA Sevens or SVNS LAX is a rugby sevens tournament played at Dignity Health Sports Park, Carson, California. Twelve men's and women's teams participated.

France won the men's event and their first title in the USA and their first title since 2005, defeating Great Britain in the final. New Zealand won the women's event and their fifth title in the USA, defeating Australia in the final.

== Men's tournament ==
=== Pool stage ===
Points system: Teams were awarded 3 points for a win, 2 points for a draw and 0 points for a loss. For a loss of 7 points or fewer teams were awarded 1 bonus point.

Key to colours in pool tables
Teams that advanced to the cup quarterfinals
Teams that advanced to the 9th place semifinals

=== Pool A ===
Pos	Team	Pld	W	L	PF	PA	PD	BP	Pts
1	Argentina	3	3	0	71	38	+33	0	9
2	Ireland	3	1	2	45	45	0	1	4
3	Spain	3	1	2	57	64	−7	1	4
4	South Africa	3	1	2	27	53	−26	0	3

1 March
19:38

Ireland	17–0	South Africa

Dignity Health Sports Park, Los Angeles

1 March
20:00

Argentina	28–19	Spain

Dignity Health Sports Park, Los Angeles

2 March
10:14

Ireland	14–19	Spain

Dignity Health Sports Park, Los Angeles

2 March
10:36

Argentina	17–5	South Africa

Dignity Health Sports Park, Los Angeles

2 March
14:44

South Africa	22–19	Spain

Dignity Health Sports Park, Los Angeles

2 March
15:06

Argentina	26–14	Ireland

Dignity Health Sports Park, Los Angeles

=== Pool B ===
Pos	Team	Pld	W	L	PF	PA	PD	BP	Pts
1	Australia	3	3	0	69	48	+21	0	9
2	United States	3	2	1	71	48	+23	1	7
3	New Zealand	3	1	2	46	60	−14	1	4
4	Samoa	3	0	3	38	69	−31	1	1

1 March
20:22

New Zealand	17–24	Australia

Dignity Health Sports Park, Los Angeles

1 March
20:44

United States	31–12	Samoa

Dignity Health Sports Park, Los Angeles

2 March
10:58

New Zealand	10–7	Samoa

Dignity Health Sports Park, Los Angeles

2 March
11:20

United States	12–17 (a.e.t.)	Australia

Dignity Health Sports Park, Los Angeles

2 March
15:28

Samoa	19–28	Australia

Dignity Health Sports Park, Los Angeles

2 March
15:50

New Zealand	19–28	United States

Dignity Health Sports Park, Los Angeles

=== Pool C ===
Pos	Team	Pld	W	L	PF	PA	PD	BP	Pts
1	Fiji	3	3	0	69	22	+47	0	9
2	France	3	2	1	53	33	+20	1	7
3	Great Britain	3	1	2	55	48	+7	2	5
4	Canada	3	0	3	21	95	−74	0	0

1 March
18:54

Fiji	15–12	Great Britain

Dignity Health Sports Park, Los Angeles

1 March
19:16

France	24–7	Canada

Dignity Health Sports Park, Los Angeles

2 March
09:30

Fiji	40–0	Canada

Dignity Health Sports Park, Los Angeles

2 March
09:52

France	19–12	Great Britain

Dignity Health Sports Park, Los Angeles

2 March
14:00

Great Britain	31–14	Canada

Dignity Health Sports Park, Los Angeles

2 March
14:22

France	10–14	Fiji

Dignity Health Sports Park, Los Angeles

=== 9th to 12th playoffs ===
9th place semifinals
2 March 2024– 18:30 – Dignity Health Sports Park
South Africa	10
Samoa	19
2 March 2024– 18:52 – Dignity Health Sports Park
New Zealand	19
Canada	7

9th place final
3 March 2024– 12:10 – Dignity Health Sports Park
Samoa	12
New Zealand	5
11th place final
3 March 2024– 11:48 – Dignity Health Sports Park
South Africa	28
Canada	15

=== 5th to 8th playoffs ===
Key to colours in table
Teams that advanced to the 5th place final
Teams that advanced to the 7th place final

Team	Points Difference
Fiji	+45
Argentina	+23
Australia	+14
United States	+9

Fifth Place

3 March
15:58

Fiji	21–26	Argentina

Dignity Health Sports Park, Los Angeles

Seventh Place

3 March
15:14

Australia	24–14	United States

Dignity Health Sports Park, Los Angeles

=== Cup ===
Quarterfinals
2 March 2024– 19:26 – Dignity Health Sports Park
United States	0
France	14
2 March 2024– 19:48 – Dignity Health Sports Park
Argentina	14
Ireland	24
2 March 2024– 20:10 – Dignity Health Sports Park
Fiji	19
Spain	21
2 March 2024– 20:32 – Dignity Health Sports Park
Australia	19
Great Britain	26

Semifinals
3 March 2024– 14:08 – Dignity Health Sports Park
France	26
Ireland	24
3 March 2024– 14:30 – Dignity Health Sports Park
Spain	7
Great Britain	10

Final
3 March 2024– 18:32 – Dignity Health Sports Park
France	21
Great Britain	0
3rd place final
3 March 2024– 17:10 – Dignity Health Sports Park
Ireland	24
Spain	7

=== Final placings ===
Place	Team
1st place, gold medalist(s)	France
2nd place, silver medalist(s)	Great Britain
3rd place, bronze medalist(s)	Ireland
4	Spain
5	Argentina
6	Fiji
7	Australia
8	United States
9	Samoa
10	New Zealand
11	South Africa
12	Canada

=== Dream Team ===
Player	Country
Andy Timo	France
Juan Ramos	Spain
Antoine Dupont	France
Paulin Riva	France
Robbie Fergusson	Great Britain
Alex Davis	Great Britain
Harry McNulty	Ireland

== Women's tournament ==
=== Pool stage ===
Points system: Teams were awarded 3 points for a win, 2 points for a draw and 0 points for a loss. For a loss of 7 points or fewer teams were awarded 1 bonus point.

Key to colours in pool tables
Teams that advanced to the cup quarterfinals
Teams that advanced to the 9th place semifinals

=== Pool A ===
Pos	Team	Pld	W	L	PF	PA	PD	BP	Pts
1	New Zealand	3	3	0	119	12	+107	0	9
2	South Africa	3	2	1	34	53	−24	0	6
3	Brazil	3	1	2	19	55	−36	1	4
4	Fiji	3	0	3	19	69	−50	1	1

1 March
17:14

Fiji	5–12	Brazil

Dignity Health Sports Park, Los Angeles

1 March
17:36

New Zealand	41–5	South Africa

Dignity Health Sports Park, Los Angeles

2 March
12:26

Fiji	7–19	South Africa

Dignity Health Sports Park, Los Angeles

2 March
12:48

New Zealand	40–0	Brazil

Dignity Health Sports Park, Los Angeles

2 March
17:02

South Africa	10–7	Brazil

Dignity Health Sports Park, Los Angeles

2 March
17:24

New Zealand	38–7	Fiji

Dignity Health Sports Park, Los Angeles

=== Pool B ===
Pos	Team	Pld	W	L	PF	PA	PD	BP	Pts
1	Australia	3	3	0	94	19	+75	0	9
2	France	3	2	1	70	29	+41	1	7
3	Ireland	3	1	2	31	64	–33	0	3
4	Japan	3	0	3	24	107	–83	0	0

1 March
16:30

Australia	31–0	Ireland

Dignity Health Sports Park, Los Angeles

1 March
16:52

France	35–7	Japan

Dignity Health Sports Park, Los Angeles

2 March
11:42

Australia	46–5	Japan

Dignity Health Sports Park, Los Angeles

2 March
12:04

France	21–5	Ireland

Dignity Health Sports Park, Los Angeles

2 March
16:18

Ireland	26–12	Japan

Dignity Health Sports Park, Los Angeles

2 March
16:40

France	14–17	Australia

Dignity Health Sports Park, Los Angeles

=== Pool C ===
Pos	Team	Pld	W	L	PF	PA	PD	BP	Pts
1	United States	3	3	0	96	31	+65	0	9
2	Canada	3	2	1	70	32	+38	1	7
3	Spain	3	1	2	26	90	−64	0	3
4	Great Britain	3	0	3	36	75	−39	1	1

1 March
17:58

Canada	20–10	Great Britain

Dignity Health Sports Park, Los Angeles

1 March
18:20

United States	40–5	Spain

Dignity Health Sports Park, Los Angeles

2 March
13:10

Canada	31–0	Spain

Dignity Health Sports Park, Los Angeles

2 March
13:32

United States	34–7	Great Britain

Dignity Health Sports Park, Los Angeles

2 March
17:46

Spain	21–19	Great Britain

Dignity Health Sports Park, Los Angeles

2 March
18:08

Canada	19–22	United States

Dignity Health Sports Park, Los Angeles

=== 9th to 12th playoffs ===
9th place semifinals
3 March 2024– 09:30 – Dignity Health Sports Park
Great Britain	17
Fiji	12
3 March 2024– 09:52 – Dignity Health Sports Park
Spain	12
Japan	14

9th place final
3 March 2024– 12:54 – Dignity Health Sports Park
Great Britain	19
Japan	24
11th place final
3 March 2024– 12:32 – Dignity Health Sports Park
Fiji	40
Spain	7

=== 5th to 8th playoffs ===
Key to colours in table
Teams that advanced to the 5th place final
Teams that advanced to the 7th place final

Team	Points Difference
France	+32
South Africa	–41
Brazil	–55
Ireland	–57

Fifth Place

3 March
15:36

France	55–0	South Africa

Dignity Health Sports Park, Los Angeles

Seventh Place

3 March
14:52

Ireland	14–28	Brazil

Dignity Health Sports Park, Los Angeles

=== Cup ===
Quarterfinals
3 March 2024– 10:14 – Dignity Health Sports Park
France	19
Canada	28
3 March 2024– 10:36 – Dignity Health Sports Park
New Zealand	36
Ireland	12
3 March 2024– 10:58 – Dignity Health Sports Park
United States	24
South Africa	7
3 March 2024– 11:20 – Dignity Health Sports Park
Australia	26
Brazil	5

Semifinals
3 March 2024– 13:24 – Dignity Health Sports Park
Canada	12
New Zealand	31
3 March 2024– 13:46 – Dignity Health Sports Park
United States	19
Australia	26

Final
3 March 2024– 17:43 – Dignity Health Sports Park
New Zealand	29
Australia	14
3rd place final
3 March 2024– 16:40 – Dignity Health Sports Park
Canada	7
United States	21

=== Final placings ===
Place	Team
1st place, gold medalist(s)	New Zealand
2nd place, silver medalist(s)	Australia
3rd place, bronze medalist(s)	United States
4	Canada
5	France
6	South Africa
7	Brazil
8	Ireland
9	Japan
10	Great Britain
11	Fiji
12	Spain

=== Dream Team ===
Player	Country
Chloe Daniels	Canada
Isabella Nasser	Australia
Ilona Maher	United States
Jorja Miller	New Zealand
Portia Woodman	New Zealand
Sharni Williams	Australia
Michaela Blyde	New Zealand

2023–24 SVNS
Preceded by 2024 Canada Sevens	2024 USA Sevens	Succeeded by 2024 Hong Kong Sevens
