= 2023 Dubai Sevens =

World Rugby Sevens Series tournaments

- 2023–24 SVNS
- Host nation: UAE

Men
- Date: 2–3 December 2023
- Champion: South Africa
- Runner-up: Argentina
- Third: New Zealand

Women
- Date: 2–3 December 2023
- Champion: Australia
- Runner-up: New Zealand
- Third: France

Tournament details
- Matches played: 64

The 2023 Dubai Sevens or SVNS DXB was a rugby sevens tournament played at The Sevens. Twelve men's teams and a similar number of women's teams participated.

South Africa won the men's event and their fifth consecutive title in Dubai, defeating Argentina in the final. Australia won the women's event and their fourth consecutive title in Dubai, defeating New Zealand in the final.

== Men's tournament ==
=== Pool stage ===
Points system: Teams were awarded 3 points for a win, 2 points for a draw and 0 points for a loss. For a loss of 7 points or fewer teams were awarded 1 bonus point.

Key to colours in pool tables
Teams that advanced to the cup quarterfinals
Teams that advanced to the 9th place semifinals

=== Pool A ===
Pos	Team	Pld	W	L	PF	PA	PD	BP	Pts
1	South Africa	3	3	0	78	47	+31	0	9
2	New Zealand	3	2	1	59	54	+5	1	7
3	Samoa	3	1	2	50	36	+14	1	4
4	Canada	3	0	3	35	85	–50	1	1

2 December
00:00

New Zealand	26–21	Canada

The Sevens Stadium, Dubai

2 December
00:00

Samoa	14–22	South Africa

The Sevens Stadium, Dubai

2 December
00:00

South Africa	35–14	Canada

The Sevens Stadium, Dubai

2 December
00:00

New Zealand	14–12	Samoa

The Sevens Stadium, Dubai

2 December
00:00

Samoa	24–0	Canada

The Sevens Stadium, Dubai

2 December
00:00

New Zealand	19–21	South Africa

The Sevens Stadium, Dubai

=== Pool B ===
Pos	Team	Pld	W	L	PF	PA	PD	BP	Pts
1	Argentina	3	3	0	74	33	+41	0	9
2	Ireland	3	2	1	61	39	+22	0	6
3	Australia	3	1	2	51	57	–6	1	4
4	Spain	3	0	3	23	86	–57	0	0

2 December
00:00

Argentina	26–12	Spain

The Sevens Stadium, Dubai

2 December
00:00

Australia	12–19	Ireland

The Sevens Stadium, Dubai

2 December
00:00

Ireland	35–10	Spain

The Sevens Stadium, Dubai

2 December
00:00

Argentina	31–14	Australia

The Sevens Stadium, Dubai

2 December
00:00

Australia	25–7	Spain

The Sevens Stadium, Dubai

2 December
00:00

Argentina	17–7	Ireland

The Sevens Stadium, Dubai

=== Pool C ===
Pos	Team	Pld	W	L	PF	PA	PD	BP	Pts
1	United States	3	2	1	76	47	+29	1	7
2	Fiji	3	2	1	61	43	+18	0	6
3	France	3	1	2	54	66	–12	0	3
4	Great Britain	3	1	2	36	71	–35	0	3

2 December
00:00

Fiji	21–14	United States

The Sevens Stadium, Dubai

2 December
00:00

France	35–0	Great Britain

The Sevens Stadium, Dubai

2 December
00:00

Great Britain	12–36	United States

The Sevens Stadium, Dubai

2 December
00:00

Fiji	40–5	France

The Sevens Stadium, Dubai

2 December
00:00

France	14–26	United States

The Sevens Stadium, Dubai

2 December
00:00

Fiji	0–24	Great Britain

The Sevens Stadium, Dubai

=== 9th to 12th playoffs ===
9th place semifinals
3 December 2023– 00:00 – The Sevens Stadium
France	26
Spain	12
3 December 2023– 00:00 – The Sevens Stadium
Great Britain	21
Canada	14

9th place final
3 December 2023– 00:00 – The Sevens Stadium
France	22
Great Britain	0
11th place final
3 December 2023– 00:00 – The Sevens Stadium
Spain	19
Canada	14

=== 5th to 8th playoffs ===
Key to colours in table
Teams that advanced to the 5th place final
Teams that advanced to the 7th place final

Team	Points Difference
Ireland	+20
Samoa	+7
Australia	–8
United States	–11

Seventh place

3 December
00:00

United States	12–26	Australia

The Sevens, Dubai

Fifth place

3 December
00:00

Ireland	28–5	Samoa

The Sevens, Dubai

=== Cup ===
Quarterfinals
3 December 2023– 00:00 – The Sevens Stadium
South Africa	24
Australia	7
3 December 2023– 00:00 – The Sevens Stadium
Ireland	24
Fiji	29
3 December 2023– 00:00 – The Sevens Stadium
United States	0
New Zealand	40
3 December 2023– 00:00 – The Sevens Stadium
Samoa	14
Argentina	21

Semifinals
3 December 2023– 00:00 – The Sevens Stadium
South Africa	14
Fiji	7
3 December 2023– 00:00 – The Sevens Stadium
New Zealand	19
Argentina	21

Final
3 December 2023– 00:00 – The Sevens Stadium
South Africa	12
Argentina	7
3rd place final
3 December 2023– 00:00 – The Sevens Stadium
Fiji	12
New Zealand	17

=== Final placings ===
Place	Team
1st place, gold medalist(s)	South Africa
2nd place, silver medalist(s)	Argentina
3rd place, bronze medalist(s)	New Zealand
4	Fiji
5	Ireland
6	Samoa
7	Australia
8	United States
9	France
10	Great Britain
11	Spain
12	Canada

=== Dream Team ===
Player	Country
Leroy Carter	New Zealand
Scott Curry	New Zealand
Selvyn Davids	South Africa
Rosko Specman	South Africa
Marcos Moneta	Argentina
Germán Schulz	Argentina
Terio Veilawa	Fiji

== Women's tournament ==
=== Pool stage ===
Points system: Teams were awarded 3 points for a win, 2 points for a draw and 0 points for a loss. For a loss of 7 points or fewer teams were awarded 1 bonus point.

Key to colours in pool tables
Teams that advanced to the cup quarterfinals
Teams that advanced to the 9th place semifinals

=== Pool A ===
Pos	Team	Pld	W	L	PF	PA	PD	BP	Pts
1	New Zealand	3	3	0	91	42	+49	0	9
2	Fiji	3	2	1	80	63	+17	0	6
3	Great Britain	3	1	2	41	86	–45	0	3
4	South Africa	3	0	3	36	57	–21	2	2

2 December
00:00

New Zealand	19–14	South Africa

The Sevens, Dubai

2 December
00:00

Fiji	38–17	Great Britain

The Sevens, Dubai

2 December
00:00

Fiji	21–17	South Africa

The Sevens, Dubai

2 December
00:00

New Zealand	43–7	Great Britain

The Sevens, Dubai

2 December
00:00

Great Britain	17–5	South Africa

The Sevens, Dubai

2 December
00:00

New Zealand	29–21	Fiji

The Sevens, Dubai

=== Pool B ===
Pos	Team	Pld	W	L	PF	PA	PD	BP	Pts
1	Australia	3	3	0	138	5	+133	0	9
2	Ireland	3	2	1	59	54	+5	0	6
3	Brazil	3	1	2	35	70	–35	1	4
4	Japan	3	0	3	19	121	–103	0	0

2 December
00:00

Australia	39–0	Brazil

The Sevens, Dubai

2 December
00:00

Ireland	35–7	Japan

The Sevens, Dubai

2 December
00:00

Ireland	19–14	Brazil

The Sevens, Dubai

2 December
00:00

Australia	66–0	Japan

The Sevens, Dubai

2 December
00:00

Japan	12–21	Brazil

The Sevens, Dubai

2 December
00:00

Australia	33–5	Ireland

The Sevens, Dubai

=== Pool C ===
Pos	Team	Pld	W	L	PF	PA	PD	BP	Pts
1	France	3	3	0	95	12	+83	0	9
2	Canada	3	2	1	53	51	+2	0	6
3	United States	3	1	2	42	53	–11	1	4
4	Spain	3	0	3	19	93	–74	0	0

2 December
00:00

France	29–0	Canada

The Sevens, Dubai

2 December
00:00

United States	27–0	Spain

The Sevens, Dubai

2 December
00:00

France	28–7	Spain

The Sevens, Dubai

2 December
00:00

United States	10–15 (a.e.t.)	Canada

The Sevens, Dubai

2 December
00:00

Canada	38–12	Spain

The Sevens, Dubai

2 December
00:00

United States	5–38	France

The Sevens, Dubai

=== 9th to 12th playoffs ===
9th place semifinals
3 December 2023– 00:00 – The Sevens Stadium
Great Britain	0
Japan	21
3 December 2023– 00:00 – The Sevens Stadium
South Africa	17
Spain	0

9th place final
3 December 2023– 00:00 – The Sevens Stadium
Japan	12
South Africa	5
11th place final
3 December 2023– 00:00 – The Sevens Stadium
Great Britain	26
Spain	12

=== 5th to 8th playoffs ===
Key to colours in table
Teams that advanced to the 5th place final
Teams that advanced to the 7th place final

Team	Points Difference
Ireland	+3
Fiji	–7
United States	–38
Brazil	–47

Seventh place

3 December
00:00

United States	38–7	Brazil

The Sevens Stadium, Dubai

Fifth place

3 December
00:00

Ireland	19–24 (a.e.t.)	Fiji

The Sevens Stadium, Dubai

=== Cup ===
Quarterfinals
3 December 2023– 00:00 – The Sevens Stadium
New Zealand	26
Brazil	14
3 December 2023– 00:00 – The Sevens
Ireland	12
Canada	14
3 December 2023– 00:00 – The Sevens Stadium
France	38
Fiji	14
3 December 2023– 00:00 – The Sevens Stadium
Australia	32
United States	5

Semifinals
3 December 2023– 00:00 – The Sevens Stadium
New Zealand	21
Canada	19
3 December 2023– 00:00 – The Sevens Stadium
France	14
Australia	21

Final
3 December 2023– 00:00 – The Sevens Stadium
New Zealand	19
Australia	26
3rd place final
3 December 2023– 00:00 – The Sevens Stadium
Canada	5
France	26

=== Final placings ===
Place	Team
1st place, gold medalist(s)	Australia
2nd place, silver medalist(s)	New Zealand
3rd place, bronze medalist(s)	France
4	Canada
5	Fiji
6	Ireland
7	United States
8	Brazil
9	Japan
10	South Africa
11	Great Britain
12	Spain

=== Dream Team ===
Player	Country
Charlotte Caslick	Australia
Maddison Levi	Australia
Teagan Levi	Australia
Jorja Miller	New Zealand
Anne-Cécile Ciofani	France
Florence Symonds	Canada
Reapi Ulunisau	Fiji

2023–24 SVNS
Preceded by None (first event)	2023 Dubai Sevens	Succeeded by 2023 South Africa Sevens
