= Stacey Waaka =

New Zealand international rugby union & league player

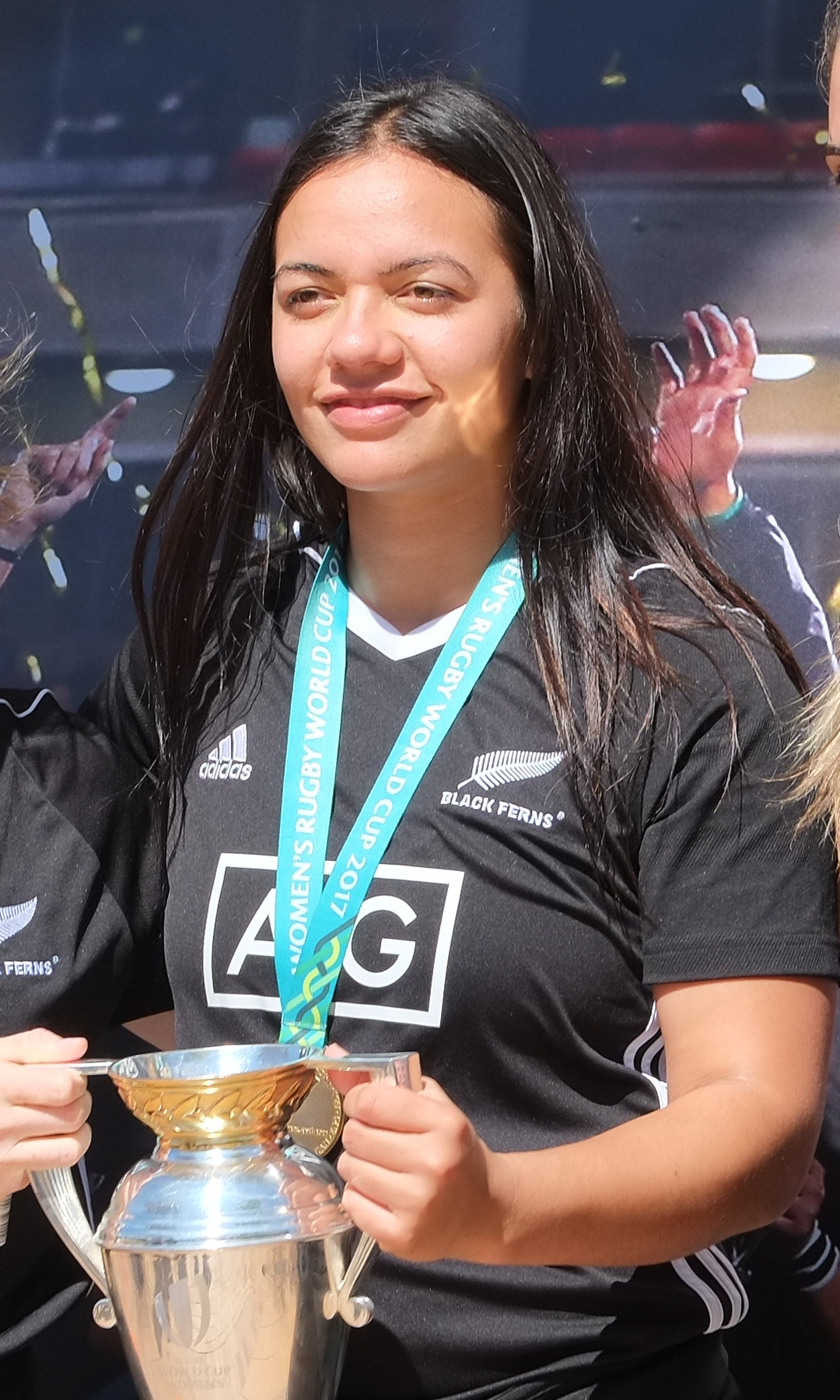
- Waaka at the 2017 World Cup celebration in Wellington.
- Born: Stacey Jamie Aroha Kirsten Waaka; 3 November 1995 (age 31) Papakura, New Zealand
- Height: 1.70 m (5 ft 7 in)
- Weight: 72 kg (159 lb)

Rugby union career
- Position: Centre
Provincial / State sides
Years	Team	Apps	(Points)
2014–2020	Waikato	26	(155)
Super Rugby
Years	Team	Apps	(Points)
2022	Chiefs Manawa	1	(0)
International career
Years	Team	Apps	(Points)
2015–24	New Zealand	32	(65)
National sevens team
Years	Team		Comps
2016–26	New Zealand		167 apps
- Rugby league career

Playing information
- Position: Wing
Club
Years	Team	Pld	T	G	FG	P
2024–25	Brisbane Broncos	6	6	0	0	24
2026–	New Zealand Warriors	10	9	0	0	36
	Total	16	15	0	0	60
Representative
Years	Team	Pld	T	G	FG	P
2026	New Zealand	5	9	0	0	36
- Source: As of 15 November 2026
Medal record
Representing New Zealand
Women's rugby union
Women's Rugby World Cup
Gold medal – first place	2017 Ireland	Team competition
Gold medal – first place	2021 New Zealand	Team competition
Bronze medal – third place	2025 England	Team competition
Women's rugby sevens
Olympic Games
Gold medal – first place	2024 Paris	Team competition
Gold medal – first place	2020 Tokyo	Team competition
Commonwealth Games
Gold medal – first place	2018 Gold Coast	Team competition
Bronze medal – third place	2022 Birmingham	Team competition
Rugby World Cup Sevens
Gold medal – first place	2018 San Francisco	Team competition
Silver medal – second place	2022 Cape Town	Team competition

Stacey Jamie Aroha Kirsten Waaka (born 3 November 1995) is a New Zealand rugby football player who has represented her country in rugby sevens, rugby union and rugby league. Waaka has also represented New Zealand in touch rugby and at provincial level in athletics, hockey and netball.

She has played fifteen-a-side and seven-a-side rugby union, and was a member of the New Zealand Women's Sevens team and New Zealand Women's National Rugby Union team. Waaka was a member of the New Zealand Women's Sevens team which won gold medals at the 2020 Summer Olympics in Tokyo and 2024 Summer Olympics in Paris. She was also a member of the New Zealand fifteen-a-side team which won the 2017 Women's Rugby World Cup and the 2021 Women's Rugby World Cup. Following the Paris Olympics she spent the Sevens off-season playing rugby league during an injury-disrupted 2024 season with the Brisbane Broncos.

She currently plays rugby league at wing for New Zealand Warriors in the NRLW. She made her international debut for the New Zealand women's national rugby league team on 18 October 2026.

== Early life ==
Waaka was born on 3 November 1995 in Papakura, New Zealand to Raewyn (née Allan) and Simon Waaka. She has three older siblings, sister Shannon, brothers Bronson and Beaudein. In her youth her mother participated in athletics, gymnastics and netball while father played representative rugby for Thames Valley in 1981 and for Victoria against the touring All Blacks in 1992. Her brothers played rugby, while her sister played netball. Among her cousins are All Black Arthur Stone, Maori All Black Otere Black, Sevens player Ngarohi McGarvey-Black, rugby league internationals Phillip Orchard and Robert Orchard.

She was the only one born in New Zealand as her parents had moved the family back and forth between Australia and Auckland several times. At age one, the family moved permanently back to Australia, and lived in Melbourne for eight years. The family would return to New Zealand very Christmas to visit family in Ruatoki in the eastern Bay of Plenty. Her father had 17 siblings, and as a result Waaka has more than 70 first cousins, many of them resident in the area around Ruatoki. Following one Christmas, spent with their grandmother Kiri on the farm, Waaka and her brother Beaudein said they didn't want to leave. As a result, her parents moved back permanently to Ruatoki in 2004. Initially her parents found it difficult to find steady work and initially lived in a tent among the 15 extended family members staying with the children's grandmother. Upon the family's permanent return to Ruatoki she attended Taneatua Primary School. She began playing a range of sports, including netball and touch rugby. At this point she had hopes of representing New Zealand in netball.

She moved to Whakatane High School in 2009, where she continued playing various sports. By the age of 15 Waaka was a New Zealand touch youth international. She performed in the high school’s kapa haka group.

in September 2011, 15-year-old Waaka was on her way home from Whakatane in a school bus near Ruatoki when it was hit from behind by an unladen truck. The impact was sufficient to throw her from her seat, and she came to lying in the aisle of the bus, on top of other children. Using her cellphone she called the police for help before assisting some of the injured children off the bus, including her niece and nephew. She then walked to a nearby Matariki Early Childhood Centre to telephone her mother before returning to the crash site where she helped other children. In all 36 people were injured with 28 taken to hospital, many of them with broken bones. Waaka received lacerations to her legs which prevented her playing sports for a few months.

While in year 11 at school she was encouraged by a teacher to play rugby for the school's girls First XV. She scored five tries in her first game and the team went on to defeat Rotorua Girl's High School in the season final. Her performance led to the coach of the Bay of Plenty women's seven's team asked her to attend a trial with the team. By year 13 she had been promoted to captain of her school's touch rugby and netball teams. In that same year she was named her school's sportswoman of the year, best all-round Māori girl and best all-round girl.

After she heard through ads on TV in 2012 for the "Go for Gold" programme that Sevens rugby was to be an Olympic sport, she realised she could have an opportunity to play rugby full-time. As a result, at the age of 16 she was one of the 800 young women who attended the "Go for Gold" Sevens trials in 2012 organised to identify talent with the potential to represent New Zealand in the Sevens competition at the Rio Olympics. At the trial she attended she was put through various fitness, rugby skills and character assessment activities. However she wasn't prepared to commit to the Sevens as she wanted to enjoy high school.

After leaving high school she began studying sport management at the University of Waikato, staying in the university hostel in Hamilton. While there she was invited by a friend to play rugby for the university's women's team.

== Rugby career ==
Waaka's performance for the university team led to be her playing for the Waikato women's provincial rugby team. She made her debut for the Waikato team in theor game against Hawkes Bay on 23 August 2014 at Tremain Field, Park Island in Napier. She contributed two tries to her team’s 43-3 defeat of Hawkes Bay. She played eight games for them over the course of the 2014 season scoring 11 tries. Her impressive debut season bought her to the attention of the coach's of the New Zealand Seven's programme and she was invited in 2014 to attend a couple of their training camps. Witnessing a New Zealand international fifteen-a-side game in Auckland made her realise that she had the potential to play for the team. As a result she began to change her casual attitude to training to a more disciplined approach.

She was also invted to trial for the New Zealand fifteen-a-side team. This led to her being selected as a midfield back for the 2015 Super Series in Canada. She made her debut at Calgary on 27 June 2015 where she played at centre. She played in all three matches in the tournament, which was won by New Zealand. In the third game of the series, which was against the United States on 5 July 2015, at Ellerslie Rugby Park in Edmonton she scored her first try for New Zealand team.

In 2014 Waaka was invited to attend a training camp for the fifteen-a-side New Zealand Women's rugby team. She debuted for them in their game at Calgary against Canada on 27 June 2015 where she played at centre. This was the same year her brother Beaudein Waaka made his Rugby sevens debut for New Zealand. She played in all three games in the series, which was won by New Zealand. In the third game of the series, which was against the United States on 5 July 2015, at Ellerslie Rugby Park in Edmonton she scored her first try for New Zealand team.

To reduce the workload on her university studies, training and playing international rugby her parents moved to Hamilton so that she could live with them.

=== Recruitment for the sevens team ===
Waaka began playing sevens at an international level when she was included in the New Zealand development squad for the women's sevens. A While a member she took part in the Central Coast Sevens tournament in Kanwal, New South Wales, Australia on 23-25 October 2015. They were beaten by the Aussie Pearls 31-14 in the final.

A shoulder injury precluded Waaka from selection for the New Zealand team to play at the Dubai tournament held on 3–4 December 2015. She had recovered by the time of the next tournament to be traveling reserve to São Paulo. Asa result it wasn’t until the third tournament of the 2015–16 World Rugby Women's Sevens Series that she made her on-field debut for team at the Atlanta tournament which was held on 8-9 April 2016.

=== 2017 Women's Rugby World Cup ===
In 2017 Waaka was again selected for the Black Ferns fifteen-a-side New Zealand Women's rugby team and played at centre in eight games during their victorious 2017 Women's Rugby World Cup campaign. That year she graduated from the University of Waikato in the Bachelor of Sport and Leisure Studies with a major in Sport Management.

She played four games in August and November 2018 for the fifteen-a-side New Zealand Women's rugby team.

=== 2018 Gold Coast Commonwealth Games ===
She was a member of the New Zealand sevens team that won the gold medal at the 2018 Gold Coast Commonwealth Games, which was held on 13 and 15 April 2018. She won the medal despite not being selected to play in the final.

=== 2018–19 World Rugby Women's Sevens Series ===
With Portia Woodman out of commission since October 2018 as a result of an Achilles tendon injury Waaka filled her shoes to become the dominant try scorer during the 2018–19 World Rugby Women's Sevens Series season. She was also selected for four out of five Dream Teams and was also awarded two Impact Player of the Tournament titles. It was during this period that she acquired the nickname "The Smiling Assassin".

A broken wrist prematurely ended her 2019 season, leaving her unable to even pick up a rugby ball for four months.

With the international seven series suspended due to the COVID-19 pandemic she took the opportunity to play seven games for the Waikato team in the 2020 Farah Palmer Cup, held in September and November of that year.

In January 2021 she had keyhole surgery on a knee to resolve a meniscus issue.

=== 2020 Tokyo Olympic Games ===
In July 2021, she was a member of the New Zealand team that won the gold medal in the women's event at the 2020 Summer Olympics.

On 20 March 2022 she played a game for Chiefs Manawa against the Blues in the Super Rugby Aupiki.

Waaka was named in the Black Ferns Sevens squad for the 2022 Commonwealth Games in Birmingham. She won a bronze medal at the event. She later won a silver medal at the 2022 Rugby World Cup Sevens in Cape Town.

=== 2021 Rugby World Cup ===
Waaka made the Black Ferns 32-player squad for the 2021 Rugby World Cup. She played in five games, scoring a try in the tense 25–24 semi-final clash with France.

In the final against England she scored a try at the start of the second half and later made a skilled offload that allowed Ayesha Leti-I’iga to score in the 72nd minute. After incurring an ankle injury during this action she was forced to leave the field. The Black Ferns went on to claim their sixth Rugby World Cup title. For her efforts she was named player of the match. The recovery from the injury delayed her return to sevens duty until the Hamilton tournament, which was the third in the 2022–23 season.

=== 2023 Premier Rugby Sevens ===
In May 2023, Waaka announced she was going to play for Premier Rugby Sevens in the United States. Waaka signed with the New York Locals where she played alongside Black Fern teammates Manaia Nuku and Tenika Willson.

Waaka and the Locals finished the 2023 PR7s season in second place after going 3–3 on the year. Waaka captained the Locals, totaling 15 points, 14 carries, 13 tackles, 4 steals, and 3 tries.

The Locals took second at the Eastern Conference Kickoff at Q2 Stadium in Austin, Tx. and the Eastern Conference Finals at Highmark Stadium in Pittsburgh, Pa. where New York punched their ticket to the PR7s Championship Tournament in Washington, D.C.

At the Championship, they defeated their Eastern Conference rival the Southern Headliners to advance to the title match. The Locals fell 21–10 to the Northern Loonies in the finals, ending the season in second place.

=== Return to New Zealand sevens duty ===
She returned to the New Zealand sevens team for the 2023–24 season and played in the first three tournaments before a calf injury forced her to miss the Vancouver and Los Angeles tournaments.

Waaka announced in early March 2024 that after the Paris Olympics she had agreed to play rugby league for the Brisbane Broncos in the NRL Women's Premiership. As she is contracted to New Zealand Rugby through to 2026 she would remain available to play sevens as the respective codes' seasons didn't overlap.

During the pool play game against Great Britain at the Madrid tournament held on 31 May–2 June 2024, Waaka scored her one hundredth try in the seven series.

=== 2024 Paris Olympics ===
On 20 June 2024 it was announced that she had been selected as a member of the New Zealand Women's Rugby Sevens team for the Paris Olympics. Waaka scored six tries over the course of the Olympic sevens competition to make her the third equal highest try scorer. One of her tries was in the final against Canada which was won by New Zealand 19–12 to give her back-to-back Olympic gold medals.

=== Commences playing rugby league ===
After arriving back in New Zealand from Paris on the morning of 2 August 2024 Waaka departed two days later to take up her rugby league contract with the Brisbane Broncos playing in the NRL Women's Premiership rugby league competition which was already underway, having started on 25 July. She had previously announced in early March 2024 that she was taking up rugby league after the Paris Olympics. As two years remain on her New Zealand Rugby contract she was still available to play sevens.

Waaka made her debut for the Broncos against the Gold Coast Titans Women on 11 August 2024. She went on to score six tries in her first six appearances before her debut season was bought to an end when after scoring a try in Brisbane Broncos’ 20–16 victory over the Cronulla Sharks on 14 September 2024 she had to leave the field at half time with what later turned out to be a fractured fibula in her right leg. As a result, she was unavailable for selection for both the New Zealand women's national rugby league team for their 2024 Rugby League Pacific Championship campaign and the New Zealand Sevens team for the first two tournaments of the 2024–2025 season. Despite her limited number of appearances Waaka's performance was sufficient to see her named in both the NRLW's Dally M Women Team of the Year and the Rugby League Players Association (RLPA) Women's Dream Team. She was also named the Brisbane Broncos’ NRLW Rookie of the Year.

=== Return from injury ===
Waaka initially thought it would take six to eight weeks to recover from her leg injury but it took longer, forcing her to miss the first two tournaments of the international sevens series in Dubai and Cape Town. She began light running over Christmas/New Year period. She missed the Perth tournament, instead opting to gain some match time by captaining the New Zealand Women's Development team at the Coral Coast Sevens tournament held on 16–18 January at Lawaqa Park in Sigatoka, Fiji. The team featured several national under 18 sevens representatives as well as Black Ferns contracted players Louise Blyde, Justine McGregor and Olive Watherstone.

Fully fit she was named in New Zealand sevens team for the fourth tournament of the season held in Vancouver on 21–23 February 2025. She celebrated her return by scoring a total of nine tries over the course of the tournament.

In July 2025, she was named in the Black Ferns squad to contest the Women's Rugby World Cup.

Following her service in the fifteen-a-side New Zealand team she returned to the Sevens team competing in the 2025-26 international sevens series. At the final tournament of the series which was held in Bordeaux on 5–7 June 2026 she was forced to miss the knockout matches after sustaining a head knock.

=== New Zealand Warriors Women ===
In late October 2025 she signed a 2-year contract with the New Zealand Warriors.

The concussion that she had received in the last tournament of the sevens season meant that she missed the first round of the NRL Women's Premiership. As a result she debuted for the Warriors in their match against the Canberra Raiders on 11 July 2026, at GIO Stadium in Canberra, Australia. She made 10 appearances in her first season with the team, scoring nine tries.

=== 2026 Women's Rugby League World Cup ===
She began her New Zealand rugby league international representative career when she was selected for the New Zealand women's national rugby league team to contest the 2026 Women's Rugby League World Cup. She made her international debut for them in the match against Fiji on 18 October 2026 at the McDonald Jones Stadium in Newcastle, Australia, scoring two tries to contribute to New Zealand’s 18-12 win.

She was awarded the Golden Boot award for best female player at the World Cup.

== Television career ==
Alongside Liam Messam and Erena Mikaere, Waaka was presenter in 2021 on Te Ao Toa, a weekly sports show on Maori TV.

== Awards and honours ==
Waaka won the Junior Māori Sportswoman of the Year award in 2015.

Because of the courage she had shown during a bus crash in 2011, Waaka was selected in 2019 by World Rugby to be a member of The Unstoppables XV. This was a team of women who've overcome barriers to participate in rugby. It was part of the year long initiative to boost the profile of the women's game globally.

At the 2020 World Rugby Sevens Series Awards, Waaka won the impact player award, the top try scorer awards and was selected as a member of that year's women's dream team.

At the 2023 World Rugby Sevens Series Awards, Waaka was named as a member of the 2023 women's dream team.

In 2026, Waaka was announced as the winner of the women's 2026 IRL Golden Boot Award.

== Personal life ==
Of Māori descent, she affiliates to the Ngāi Tūhoe iwi. She married Ricky Fluhler in late 2019. They separated in early 2023, and Waaka now uses her birth name again.
