= Lily Dick =

Australian rugby league and rugby union footballer

Personal information
- Full name: Lily Dick
- Born: 26 December 1999 (age 26) Tugun, Queensland, Australia
- Height: 175 cm (5 ft 9 in)
- Weight: 69 kg (10 st 12 lb)

Playing information

Rugby union
- Position: Forward
Representative
Years	Team	Pld	T	G	FG	P
2018–24	Australia sevens

Rugby league
- Position: Second-row
Club
Years	Team	Pld	T	G	FG	P
2025–	Nth Qld Cowboys	12	0	0	0	0
Medals
Women's rugby sevens
Representing Australia
Rugby Sevens World Cup
Gold medal – first place	2022 Cape Town	Team competition
Commonwealth Games
Gold medal – first place	2022 Birmingham	Team competition
Commonwealth Youth Games
Gold medal – first place	2017 Nassau	Team competition

Lily Dick (born 26 December 1999) is an Australian professional rugby league footballer who currently plays for the North Queensland Cowboys in the NRL Women's Premiership.

She previously played rugby sevens, representing Australia and winning a Rugby World Cup Sevens and Commonwealth Games gold medal.

== Background ==
Dick was born in Tugun, Queensland and grew up in Currumbin. She attended Lindisfarne Anglican Grammar School just over the border in Tweed Heads and played her junior rugby union for the Palm Beach Currumbin Alleygators

== Playing career ==
=== Rugby union ===
In 2016, Dick made her senior debut for Queensland at the age of 16 at the National Rugby Sevens Championships in Adelaide. Dick backed up this performance by captaining the Queensland youth team to victory at the Youth National Rugby Sevens Championships in Perth. Dick was the Vice-Captain of the Australian team which won a gold medal at the 2017 Commonwealth Youth Games. Her performances during the tournament saw her recognised as the Player's Player for the tournament.

In 2018, she made her Australian debut in the 2018 Dubai Sevens, scoring a try 2 minutes after the end of regulation time to help the Australian side win a bronze medal in the third-place playoff.

Dick was a member of the Australian sevens squad that won a gold medal at the 2022 Commonwealth Games in Birmingham. She was a member of the Australian team that won the 2022 Sevens Rugby World Cup held in Cape Town, South Africa in September 2022.

In May 2024, she ruptured her anterior cruciate ligament at the Singapore Sevens and missed the 2024 Summer Olympics.

=== Rugby league ===
On 20 December 2024, Dick switch to rugby league, signing a two-year contract with the North Queensland Cowboys.

In Round 2 of the 2025 NRL Women's season, she made her debut for the Cowboys in a loss to the Newcastle Knights.

== Honours ==
- 2019 RUPA Newcomer of the Year Finalist.
- 2017 AON Uni 7s Dream Team.
- 2022 HSBC World Series "Don't Crack Under Pressure" Award.
