= Marian Baird =

Australian workplace gender equality researcher

Marian Baird AO FASSA
- Born: Marian Pam Baird

Academic background
- Education: University of Sydney
- Thesis: Transforming industrial relations: Brownfield sites, greenfield sites and commitment systems at Colgate-Palmolive (2000)

Academic work
- Sub-discipline: Gender equality in workforce relations
- Institutions: University of Sydney

Marian Pam Baird AO FASSA is an Australian academic researcher, Professor of Gender and Employment Relations and Head of the Discipline of Work and Organisational Studies at the University of Sydney, and a member of the Australian Fair Work Commission. She is also the Foundation Director of a Women and Work Research Group. Her research focuses on all aspects of women in the workforce over their lifespan.

== Academic career ==
Baird completed her secondary education at Stella Maris College in Manly, New South Wales. She graduated with a BEc (1978) and DipEd (1979), followed by a PhD (2001) in Work and Organisational Studies, all from the University of Sydney. Her 2000 thesis was titled "Transforming industrial relations: Brownfield sites, greenfield sites and commitment systems at Colgate-Palmolive".

Baird has contributed to government policy in the area of paid parental leave.

She is joint editor-in-chief of the Journal of Industrial Relations, former president and current (as of 2020) committee member of the Industrial Relations Society of New South Wales.

In March 2023, Baird was appointed by Minister for Employment and Workplace Relations Tony Burke as a part-time Expert Panel Member on the Fair Work Commission for five years.

== Honours and recognition ==
In 2014 Baird won the Edna Ryan Award "for making positive change for women in the workforce."

Baird was elected a Fellow of the Academy of the Social Sciences in Australia in 2015. In the 2016 Queen's Birthday Honours she was appointed an Officer of the Order of Australia for "distinguished service to higher education, and to women, particularly in the areas of workplace gender equality, parental leave policy and industrial relations, and to social justice".

In 2018 Apolitical named Baird in the top 100 people in the world working in gender policy.

== Selected works ==
=== Books ===
- Work and employment relations: An era of change: Essays in honour of Russell Lansbury. Baird, Marian., Hancock, Keith, 1935-, Isaac, J. E. (Joseph Ezra), 1922-, Lansbury, Russell D. Annandale, N.S.W.: Federation Press. 2011. ISBN 978-1-86287-850-1. OCLC 762240451.
- Baird, Marian; Ford, Michele; Hill, Elizabeth, eds. (2017), Women, work and care in the Asia-Pacific (1st ed.), Routledge, an imprint of the Taylor & Francis Group, ISBN 978-1-138-11904-8

=== Articles ===
- Charlesworth, Sara; Baird, Marian Pam (2007). "Getting gender on the agenda: the tale of two organisations". Gender in Management. 22 (5): 391–404. doi:10.1108/09649420710761455. Wikidata Q57534112.
- Pocock, Barbara Ann; Jude Elton; Preston, Alison; Charlesworth, Sara; Fiona MacDonald; Baird, Marian Pam; Cooper, Rachel; Bradon Ellem (2008). "The Impact of `Work Choices' on Women in Low Paid Employment in Australia: A Qualitative Analysis". Journal of Industrial Relations. 50 (3): 475–488. doi:10.1177/0022185608090001. Wikidata Q57534108.
- Jennifer Tomlinson; Baird, Marian Pam; Peter Berg; Cooper, Rachel (2017). "Flexible careers across the life course: Advancing theory, research and practice". Human Relations. 71 (1): 4–22. doi:10.1177/0018726717733313. Wikidata Q59885729.
