= Teagan Levi =

Australian rugby union player

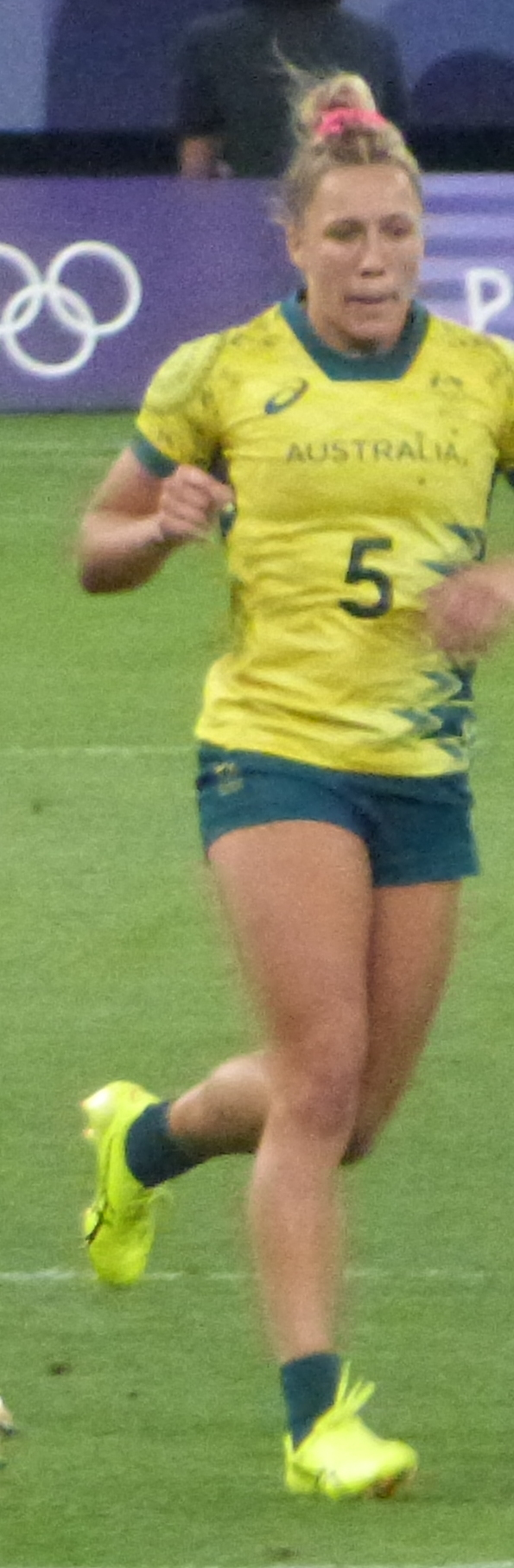
- Born: 14 August 2003 (age 23)
- Height: 1.73 m (5 ft 8 in)
- Weight: 66 kg (146 lb)
- Notable relative: Maddison Levi (sister)

Rugby union career
Super Rugby
Years	Team	Apps	(Points)
2025	Queensland Reds		(0)
National sevens team
Years	Team		Comps
2021–	Australia		44 tries 220 points
Medal record
Women's rugby sevens
Representing Australia
Rugby Sevens World Cup
Gold medal – first place	2022 Cape Town	Team competition
Commonwealth Games
Gold medal – first place	2022 Birmingham	Team competition

Teagan Levi (born 14 August 2003) is an Australian rugby union and rugby league player who has represented Australia at sevens rugby at the Commonwealth Games and Olympic Games and was a member of the Australian team that won the 2022 Sevens Rugby World Cup.

== Rugby Union ==
Levi grew up playing rugby sevens and Australian rules football throughout her upbringing and in October 2021, Levi was drafted to the Gold Coast Suns AFL Women's team with the sixth pick in the 2021 AFL Women's draft but opted to join up with the rugby sevens Australian national squad instead.

Levi won a gold medal with the Australian sevens team at the 2022 Commonwealth Games in Birmingham. She was a member of the Australian team that won the 2022 Sevens Rugby World Cup held in Cape Town, South Africa in September 2022.

In 2024, Levi was selected in the Australian women's sevens side for the sevens tournament at the Summer Olympics in Paris. Levi scored a try in each of Australia's three group matches. She also scored two conversions. This gave her a total of 19 points for the tournament.

In December 2024, she was one of a number of Australia Sevens players who committed their intentions to play for the Queensland Reds in Super Rugby Women's in 2025.

Levi continued with the Australia sevens team for the 2025-26 season, her performances including two tries against South Africa at the 2026 Hong Kong Sevens and a try in the final as Australia won the 2026 Spain Sevens in Valladolid. That year, she signed a contract to continue with Australia Sevens through to the 2028 Olympic Games. In November 2026, she was included in the Australia team for the opening tournament in the 2026–27 SVNS in Dubai.

== Rugby League ==
Levi played for the Gold Coast Titans in the NRLW. In her first year playing the sport, she was awarded the RLPA Players Rookie of the Year, Dally M Five-Eighth of the year, and the Titans NRLW Player of the Year in 2026.

== Personal life ==
She is the younger sister of fellow sevens player Maddison Levi.
