= Stella Maris College, Manly =

Catholic high school for girls in Sydney, Australia

Stella Maris College

Location
- Manly, Northern Beaches, Sydney, New South Wales; Australia; 33°47′12″S 151°17′09″E

Information
- Type: Independent single-sex secondary day school
- Motto: Latin: In Omnibus Glorificetur Deus (In all things may God be glorified)
- Religious affiliation: Sisters of the Good Samaritan
- Denomination: Roman Catholic
- Patron saint: Saint Benedict of Nursia
- Established: 1931
- Sister school: St Scholastica's College; Mater Dei Special School; Mount St Benedict College; Rosebank College; St Patrick's College, Campbelltown; Star of the Sea Wollongong
- Educational authority: New South Wales Department of Education
- Oversight: Good Samaritan Education; Diocese of Broken Bay
- Principal: Sharyn Quirk
- Staff: ~125
- Grades: 7–12
- Gender: Girls
- Enrolment: c. 1000
- Campuses: Main Campus, Eurobin and Iluka avenues; Benedict Campus, Pittwater Road
- Campus type: Suburban
- Colours: Maroon and bottle green
- Affiliations: Association of Heads of Independent Girls' Schools; Alliance of Girls' Schools Australasia; Association of Independent Schools NSW
- Website: stellamaris.nsw.edu.au

Stella Maris College is an independent Roman Catholic high school for girls, located on the northern end of Manly Beach in Manly, on the Northern Beaches of Sydney, New South Wales, Australia. Founded in 1931 by the Sisters of the Good Samaritan, the College provides a religious and general education in the Benedictine tradition for approximately 1000 girls from Year 7 to Year 12 from the surrounding area and from overseas. Stella Maris is a day school so international students board with homestay families in the local area. In recent years governance of the College has passed to Good Samaritan Education, established by the Sisters for the continued canonical oversight of all the Congregation's schools.

== History ==
In 1857, Archbishop Polding founded the first Australian order of nuns, the Sisters of the Good Samaritan of the Order of St Benedict. The sisters had been looking for a home to look after the growing number of orphaned and neglected children, and in 1880 they heard of a good-sized estate at Manly, then unoccupied and in disrepair. It proved an ideal spot and in 1881 was blessed as the Star of the Sea Convent and the Good Samaritan Sisters moved in and set up a school for them.

The sisters taught the usual school subjects up to the age of 14, then trained the girls in skills that would enable them to earn a living – mostly sewing and laundry. In 1886, the Parramatta orphanage, owned by the government but run by the Sisters of the Good Samaritan, was closed and the Sisters at Manly took in additional charges. In the very early years the Sisters also conducted a small day school for neighbourhood children and a boarding school ‘for high class ladies’ on the site.

In 1910, the orphans were moved to other more rural sites due to the development of Manly, principally to what is now Mater Dei Special School in Camden, and the Sisters took over the running of St Mary's school in Whistler Street.

In 1930, the original house was demolished and the present-day Convent and single-storey school were built and the College re-opened the following year with an intake of thirty-three pupils from Kindergarten to Intermediate Certificate, and was a co-educational primary school and a girls’ high school. The primary school was gradually phased out and by 1944, Stella Maris was purely a high school for girls.

The last Good Samaritan Principal left the school at the end of 1995, and in 1997 the Convent was handed over for College use.

Since then there have been a number of extensions and developments to accommodate the approximately nine hundred and fifty students who study there today.

In 2004, new buildings were opened comprising a theatre, dance studio, drama studio, fitness centre, music practice rooms, and new classrooms. In 2012, the new Benedict Campus opened on Pittwater Road, and in 2018 the Scholastica building comprising Science laboratories, a new library and staff work space was opened.

== List of Principals ==
1. Sr Sabina Shinnick (1931–1934)
2. Sr Joseph Fanning (1935–1940)
3. Sr Dolores Carroll (1941–1944)
4. Sr Colombiere Connors (1945–1947)
5. Sr Luigi Walker (1948–1949)
6. Sr Colette Egan (1950–1954)
7. Sr Sheila Murphy (1955–1964)
8. Sr Hermenegild Johnson (1965–1969)
9. Sr Philomena Gallagher (1970–1975)
10. Sr Consilio (Noela) Bunn (1976–1981)
11. Sr Marcella (Marilyn) Kelleher (1982–1993)
12. Sr Lia Van Haren (1994–1995)
13. Allan Coman (1996–2005)
14. Kerry Stirling (2006–2008)
15. Mary Ryland (2009) (Acting)
16. Vicki Comerford (2010–2014)
17. Elizabeth Carnegie (2015–2024)
18. Sharyn Quirk (2025–Present)

== Extra-curricular activities ==
Activities include:

- Dance Company and Ensembles
- Da Vinci Decathlon, Maths Olympiad and other external competitions
- Drama Ensembles
- Debating
- Duke of Edinburgh International Award
- Music bands, choirs, ensembles at every skill level
- Spectra Science Club, Art Club, Book Club and a range of other clubs
- Alpha Youth Group, Writers' Group
- Diverse team and individual sports at all levels of representation from inter-school to National and International

== Social Justice ==
The College supports the charitable works of the Good Samaritan Sisters in Kiribati, the Bacalod Kinder School in the Philippines, Mater Dei School in Narellan, the Melbourne Women's Shelter and Santa Teresa Mission in Central Australia. Students raise funds, donations in kind or volunteer for LifeLine, Bear Cottage, the Northern Beaches Women's Shelter, Pink Hope (a charity started by a former Stella student about breast cancer education and fundraising), St Kieran's GIFT Cook Off, Legacy, St Vincent de Paul Society, Mike Pawley's Happy Days Village school in Cambodia, an SCR Group clothing collection and Caritas Australia's Project Compassion.

== House system ==
Prior to 2013 students belonged to one of four Houses: Rosaria (Green), Carmel (Blue), Fatima (red) and Lourdes (yellow). The Houses were so-named as a reference to the fervent Marian devotion of the Sisters. As the student body grew in number, the decision was made that from 2014 the number of Houses would be increased, making the Houses more manageable for the student House Captains. Stella Maris College now has eight houses, each named after women who have made a significant contribution to the College or to Australian society in general:

House name	House colour	
Chisholm	White	In honour of Caroline Chisholm, 19th century advocate of female immigrant welfare.
MacKillop	Green	In honour of St Mary of the Cross MacKillop, Australia's first saint.
Bashir	Orange	In honour of Marie Bashir AD CVO, first woman Governor of NSW.
Noonuccal	Purple	In honour of Oodgeroo Noonuccal, formerly Kath Walker, prominent Indigenous activist and writer.
Smith	Yellow	In honour of Shirley Smith AM (Mum Shirl), a committed advocate for Indigenous Australians.
Egan	Blue	In honour of Sr Colette Egan, longest serving Sister at the College.
Shinnick	Red	In honour of Sr Sabina Shinnick, first Principal of Stella Maris College from 1931 to 1934.
Wood	Pink	In honour of Dr Fiona Wood AM, inventor of spray on skin for burns victims and 2005 Australian of the Year.

== Notable alumni ==
- Marian Baird AO, Sydney University Professor of Gender & Employment Relations
- Krystal Barter, founder of Pink Hope charity
- Dr Michelle Crockett OAM, awarded for services to medicine
- Katherine Edney, artist, Archibald Prize finalist
- Kiri English-Hawke, author and Olympic rower
- Bronte Halligan, Olympic water polo
- Nancye Hayes AM, musical theatre, stage and screen actress, singer, dancer, choreographer and director
- Piper Simons, Australia rugby sevens international.
- Kym Wilson, actress and television presenter

== See also ==
- List of Catholic schools in New South Wales
- Catholic education in Australia
- Anglican education in Australia
