= Mackenzie Davis (rugby union) =

Australian rugby player (born 2005)

- Born: 3 January 2005 (age 21)

Rugby union career
Senior career
Years	Team	Apps	(Points)
2024	NSW Waratahs Women’s Sevens		
National sevens team
Years	Team		Comps
2024-	Australia 7s		

Mackenzie Davis (born 3 January 2005) is an Australian rugby union player who plays for the Australia national rugby sevens team.

== Career ==
She played for Australia in sevens rugby at the 2023 Commonwealth Youth Games and scored five tries in the tournament as Australia won the gold medal following a 50-point victory over Canada in the final.

She played touch rugby for Australia at the Mixed Open World Cup in 2024 and played for NSW Waratahs Women's Sevens in the Next Gen Sevens.

In December 2024, she was called up for Australia for the 2024 South Africa Sevens in Cape Town, part of the 2024-25 SVNS series. She was a member of the winning team that won the 2025 Australia Sevens in January 2025. Her efforts included scoring a try in a victory against Japan 7s and playing in the final as Australia 7s beat New Zealand 7s to win the tournament. She featured at the Hong Kong Sevens in March 2025, her efforts including setting up debutant Amahli Hala for a try against Spain in the opening match, and a try in the final as Australia finished runners-up to New Zealand. She continued with the Australia sevens team for the 2025-26 SVNS season, her performances including a try in the final of the 2026 Canada Sevens.

Davis played for Clan Taran in the 2026 Ultimate Sevens. In August 2026, she signed a new contract with Australia Sevens ahead of the 2026-27 SVNS series. However, Davis suffered an ACL knee injury prior to the start of the competition.
