= Kaitlin Shave =

Australian rugby union player (born 2001)

- Born: 29 January 2001 (age 25)
- Height: 175 cm (5 ft 9 in)
- Weight: 73 kg (161 lb; 11 st 7 lb)

Rugby union career
National sevens team
Years	Team	Comps
2023–	Australia	

Kaitlin Shave (born 29 January 2001) is an Australian rugby union player. She was selected as part of the Australia national rugby sevens team at the 2024 Paris Olympics.

== Early life ==
She attended Runcorn State School and Clairvaux MacKillop College before attending the University of Queensland. She was a sprinter as a youngster, running close to 12 seconds for the 100 metres, and finishing first in a dead heat in the 100 metres at the U17 Australian Athletic Championships in Sydney. She has a 100m personal best of 12.06 seconds, a 200m personal best of 24.71 and a top 100m hurdles time of 14.55. she won national age-group titles individually and in the relay and was a relay teammate of Ella Connolly.

== Career ==
She played touch rugby league and helped the Brisbane Broncos win the NRL touch premiership in 2019. Thereafter she transitioned to Rugby 7s and won a title in South Africa with the Balkans Honey Badgers in 2022.

She was a standout player at the AON Next Gen Sevens series, being subsequently selected for the Australian 7s program in 2022. She made her debut for the Australia national rugby sevens team at the Dubai Sevens in 2023.

She was subsequently selected for the Australian team for the 2024 Paris Olympics. She continued with the Australia sevens team for the 2025-26 season, her performances including a try against South Africa at the 2026 Hong Kong Sevens. Her performances that year included a try in the semi-final of the 2026 Spain Sevens in Valladolid as Australia won the title. In October 2026, she signed a contract with the Australian Rugby Sevens team until the 2028 Olympic Games.
