= Bridget Clark =

Australian rugby union player (born 2003)

- Born: 16 January 2003 (age 23)
- Height: 1.73 m (5 ft 8 in)
- Weight: 77.8 kg (172 lb)

Rugby union career
National sevens team
Years	Team	Comps
2024–	Australia	

Bridget Clark (born 16 January 2003) is an Australian rugby union player. She was selected as part of the Australia national rugby sevens team at the 2024 Paris Olympics.

== Career ==
She plays domestic rugby for Burraneer Sevens. She was called-up to the Australia national rugby sevens team side in March 2024 after an injury to Dominique du Toit. In the bronze medal match of her debut tournament, the Hong Kong Sevens, she scored a try at 7-21 down that sparked an Australian comeback that sealed third place. She was subsequently selected for the Australian team for the 2024 Paris Olympics. She continued with the Australia sevens team for the 2025-26 season.

In August 2026, she signed a new two-year contract with Australia Sevens ahead of the 2026-27 SVNS series through to the 2028 Olympic Games.
