= Alysia Lefau-Fakaosilea =

Australian rugby union player

- Born: 5 November 2000 (age 26) Auckland, New Zealand
- Height: 1.74 m (5 ft 9 in)
- Weight: 74 kg (163 lb)
- Notable relative(s): Will Skelton (uncle); Mils Muliaina (uncle)

Rugby union career
- Position: Centre
Super Rugby
Years	Team	Apps	(Points)
	Queensland Reds		(0)
International career
Years	Team	Apps	(Points)
2019–	Australia		(0)
National sevens team
Years	Team		Comps
2021–	Australia		
Medal record
Women's rugby sevens
Representing Australia
Rugby Sevens World Cup
Gold medal – first place	2022 Cape Town	Team competition
Commonwealth Games
Gold medal – first place	2022 Birmingham	Team competition

Alysia Lefau-Fakaosilea (born 5 November 2000) is an Australian rugby union player. She has represented Australia at sevens rugby at the Olympic and Commonwealth Games.

== Early life and career ==
Lefau-Fakaosilea was born in Auckland, New Zealand to Samoan and Tongan parents. Her mother continued playing representative rugby for Auckland and the Otahuhu club after falling pregnant with her.

She played netball and OzTag (non-contact rugby league) before taking up rugby union at 14. She received her Australian citizenship in 2019.

== Rugby career ==
In 2018, she co-captained the Australian 7s team at the World School 7s tournament at Pakuranga in Auckland.

Lefau-Fakaosilea starred for the Queensland Reds in the Super W competition and eventually made her international debut for the Wallaroos in 2019.

She was selected as the 13th player for the Australian women's sevens team to the Tokyo Olympics and was added to the squad following a change in the IOC's policy in early July surrounding squad regulations.

Lefau-Fakaosilea won a gold medal with the Australian sevens team at the 2022 Commonwealth Games in Birmingham. She was also a member of the Australian team that won the 2022 Sevens Rugby World Cup held in Cape Town, South Africa in September 2022.

In 2024, she was ruled out for the Paris Olympics after suffering an ACL injury during training. She continued with the Australia sevens team for the 2025-26 season. In August 2026, she signed a new contract with Australia Sevens ahead of the 2026-27 SVNS series.

== Personal life ==
Lefau-Fakaosilea is the niece of former Wallabies lock, Will Skelton, and former All Black Mils Muliaina.
