= Piper Simons =

Australian rugby player (born 2005)

- Born: 27 July 2005 (age 21)
- School: Stella Maris College, Manly

Rugby union career
International career
Years	Team	Apps	(Points)
2026–	Australia	2	(0)
National sevens team
Years	Team		Comps
2024–	Australia 7s		

Piper Simons (born 27 July 2005) is an Australian rugby union player who plays as part of the Australia national rugby sevens team.

== Early life and education ==
She has seven brothers. She attended Stella Maris College, Manly.

== Club career ==
She played rugby for Manly Mermaids and played as part of the Australia Schoolgirls Rugby League Team in 2022. She also played touch rugby growing up, with her teammates in that including future Australia 7s teammate Mackenzie Davis.

In October 2024 she played for NSW Waratahs Women’s Sevens in the Next Gen Sevens.

== International career ==
She was a member of Australia's U18s Girls Sevens side that won the Global Youth Sevens title in Auckland in 2023. That year, she was also part of the Australian Youth Commonwealth Games gold medal team in 2023, scoring two tries in the final against Canada.

She made her debut for Australia national rugby sevens team at the Dubai Sevens in the 2024–25 SVNS series against Fiji. She continued with the Australia sevens team for the 2025-26 season. She began to train as a scrum-half with the Australia women 15-a-side squad in 2026.
