= Ruby Nicholas =

Australian rugby player (born 2004)

- Born: 9 August 2004 (age 22)
- School: Pymble Ladies' College

Rugby union career
National sevens team
Years	Team	Comps
2024-	Australia 7s	

Ruby Nicholas (born 9 August 2004) is an Australian rugby union player who plays as part of the Australia national rugby sevens team.

== Club career ==
In October 2024 she played for NSW Waratahs Women’s Sevens in the Next Gen Sevens.

== International career ==
She played in the 2022 World School Sevens and was part of the Australia A program, featuring in Fiji and Dubai towards the end of 2023.

She made her debut for Australia national rugby sevens team in the Hong Kong Sevens, part of the 2023–24 SVNS series in April 2024 as an injury replacement for Heidi Dennis, scoring her first try for her country against Ireland at the tournament. She played for the winning Australian side at the Dubai Sevens in November 2024, the opening of the 2024-25 SVNS. She continued with the Australia sevens team for the 2025-26 season.

That year, she signed a contract to continue with Australia Sevens through to the 2028 Olympic Games. In November 2026, she was included in the Australia team for the opening tournament in the 2026–27 SVNS in Dubai.

== Personal life ==
She attended Pymble Ladies' College.
