= Heidi Dennis =

Australian rugby player (born 2005)

- Born: 24 March 2005 (age 21)
- School: John Paul College

Rugby union career
National sevens team
Years	Team	Comps
2024-	Australia 7s	

Heidi Dennis (born 24 March 2005) is an Australian rugby union player who plays as part of the Australia national rugby sevens team.

== Early life ==
She attended John Paul College in Queensland.

== Career ==
She was part of the Australian Youth Commonwealth Games gold medal team in 2023. She made her debut for Australia national rugby sevens team in the 2023–24 SVNS series at the Perth Sevens until injury caused her to be replaced by Ruby Nicholas.

In October 2024 she played for Queensland Reds in the Next Gen Sevens.

In November 2024, she played for Australia in the Dubai Sevens in the 2024-25 SVNS with her efforts including two tries and a conversion against China. She scored two tries and was named player-of-the-final as Australia beat New Zealand 7s to win the 2025 Australia Sevens in Perth in January 2025. She continued with the Australia sevens team for the 2025-26 season. She was a try scorer in the final as Australia won in Cape Town at the 2025 South Africa Sevens, part of the 2025–26 SVNS and was played of the match in the final as Australia won the 2026 Spain Sevens in Valladolid. That year, she signed a contract to continue with Australia Sevens through to the 2028 Olympic Games.

In July 2026, Dennis was one of the first players announced for the Ultimate Sevens Championship, prior to the inaugural competition launch later that year.
