= Evatt Foundation =

Australian political think tank

The H.V. Evatt Memorial Foundation is an Australian think tank founded in memory of Australian politician, judge, historian and diplomat H. V. Evatt. It is based in Sydney, with members and supporters from around the world. It is a progressive organisation dedicated to the development of ideas, research, discussion and debate, and is linked to the Australian Labour movement.

== History ==
The Evatt Foundation was established in 1979 as a memorial to Dr Herbert Vere Evatt with the aim of advancing the ideals of the labour movement, such as equality, participation, social justice and human rights. The Foundation helps to promote these ideals through research, publications, public discussion and debate.

To encourage the Foundation to pursue its objectives, major grants were given by the NSW government, the Tasmanian government and other public and private organisations, including trade unions and business enterprises. From 1984 to 1999 the Foundation received an annual grant from the Commonwealth government.

The Evatt Foundation has run a public education program of seminars, conferences and publications.

On 23 August 2007, in the lead-up to the Sydney meeting of APEC, former Australian Prime Minister Paul Keating gave a public lecture organised by the Evatt Foundation.

== The first Evatt Foundation Committee (1979-1981) ==
President:Sir Richard Kirby. Vice President:Professor Manning Clark. Committee Members: Terry Higgins (Public Officer), Charles Wright, Rosalind Carrodus, Franka Arena, Lee Patterson and Jim Bayutti.

== Subsequent Evatt Foundation committees ==
Presidents (1982–2007): Cliff Dolan, the Hon Tom Uren, Bruce Childs and Christopher Sheil.

Vice-Presidents (1982–2007): The Hon Neville Wran, Elizabeth Evatt, Michael Easson, Terry Higgins, Professor Ted Wheelwright, Professor Jim Hagan, the Hon Joan Kirner, Peter Robson, the Hon Brian Howe, Sandra Moait, Tom McDonald, Ann Catling, the Hon Ron Dyer, Adam Kerslake, the Hon Jeannette McHugh (Hon Secretary), Rae Cooper and the Hon Penny Sharpe.

Committee Members (1982–2019): Penelope Siedler, Justice Brennan, Justice Phil Evatt, Senator Doug McClelland, Alan Renouf, Jack Dusseldorp, Kim Williams, Jim Falk, Robin Gurr, the Hon Andrew Refshauge, Bill Leslie, Tom Kelly, Charles Wright (Public Officer), Kerry Schott, Race Mathews, Leslie Fallick, Anna Booth, Chris Christodoulou, the Hon Bob Debus, David Haynes, Stephen Mills, Senator Graham Maguire, Suzanne Jamieson, Tom McDonald, Victoria Rubensohn, John Langmore (Public Officer), Peter Robson, Wendy Caird, Senator George Campbell, Jenny Macklin MP, Pat Staunton, the Hon Jeannette McHugh, the Hon Brian Howe, Sandra Moait, Sharan Burrow, Doug Cameron, Professor Roy Green, Professor Stuart Macintyre, the Hon Carmel Tebbutt, Julie Crane, Chris Gambian, Joanne Smith, Sue Tracy, Roberta Ryan, Richard Gartrell, Rae Cooper, Tony Moore, Professor Frank Stilwell, Rowanne Couch, Christopher Sheil, Tom Morton, Warwick McDonald, Mark McGrath, Fay Gervasoni, the Hon Penny Sharpe, Mel Gatfield, John Graham MLC, Danielle Celemajer (University of Sydney delegate), Professor Andrew Mack, Erin Watt, Huw Phillips, Michael Vaughan, Matthew Pulford, Alison Rahill, Matthew McGirr, Eamon Waterford, Clara Edwards, Eliot Olivier, Cecilia Anthony and Tina Zhou.

Life Memberships awarded The late Sir Richard Kirby, the late Cliff Dolan, Faith Bandler, Elizabeth Evatt, Rosalind Carrodus, John Burton, Professor Ted Wheelwright, the Hon Tom Uren, Jeannette McHugh and Bruce Childs.

Evatt Foundation	Executive Committee 2020/21
President	Rose Jackson
Secretary	Nicole D'Souza
Assistant Secretary	Erin Watt
Vice Presidents	The Hon. John Graham MLC; Professor Danielle Celermajer
Treasurer	Evan Hughes
Committee Members	Professor Andrew Mack; Professor Frank Stilwell; Huw Phillips; Elly Howse; Casey Thompson; Eliot Olivier
