= 2016 Canada Women's Sevens =

- Women's Sevens Series IV
- Host nation: Canada
- Date: 16 – 17 April 2016

Cup
- Champion: England
- Runner-up: New Zealand
- Third: Australia

Plate
- Winner: Canada
- Runner-up: Spain

Bowl
- Winner: Fiji
- Runner-up: Brazil

Tournament details
- Matches played: 34

The 2016 Canada Sevens was the fourth tournament within the 2015–16 World Rugby Women's Sevens Series. It was held over the weekend of 16–17 April 2016 at Westhills Stadium in Langford, Victoria, British Columbia.

== Format ==
The teams were drawn into three pools of four teams each. Each team played everyone in their pool one time. The top two teams from each pool advanced to the Cup/Plate brackets while the top 2 third place teams will also compete in the Cup/Plate. The rest of the teams from each group went to the Bowl brackets.

== Teams ==
- Australia
- Brazil
- Canada
- England
- Fiji
- France
- Ireland
- Japan
- New Zealand
- Russia
- Spain
- United States

== Pool Stage ==
Key to colours in group tables
| Teams that advance to the Cup Quarterfinal |

=== Pool A ===
| Team | Pld | W | D | L | PF | PA | PD | Pts |
|---|---|---|---|---|---|---|---|---|
| Australia | 3 | 3 | 0 | 0 | 61 | 21 | +40 | 9 |
| France | 3 | 2 | 0 | 1 | 50 | 24 | +26 | 7 |
| Russia | 3 | 1 | 0 | 2 | 50 | 48 | -2 | 5 |
| Brazil | 3 | 0 | 0 | 3 | 17 | 85 | -68 | 3 |

16 April 2016

| Australia | 12–7 | France |

Westhills Stadium, Langford

16 April 2016

| Russia | 31–10 | Brazil |

Westhills Stadium, Langford

16 April 2016

| Australia | 28–7 | Brazil |

Westhills Stadium, Langford

16 April 2016

| Russia | 12–17 | France |

Westhills Stadium, Langford

16 April 2016

| Australia | 21–7 | Russia |

Westhills Stadium, Langford

16 April 2016

| France | 26–0 | Brazil |

Westhills Stadium, Langford

=== Pool B ===
| Team | Pld | W | D | L | PF | PA | PD | Pts |
|---|---|---|---|---|---|---|---|---|
| New Zealand | 3 | 3 | 0 | 0 | 76 | 19 | +57 | 9 |
| United States | 3 | 1 | 0 | 2 | 38 | 41 | -3 | 5 |
| Spain | 3 | 1 | 0 | 2 | 27 | 53 | -26 | 5 |
| Fiji | 3 | 1 | 0 | 2 | 32 | 60 | -28 | 5 |

16 April 2016

| New Zealand | 26–5 | Fiji |

Westhills Stadium, Langford

16 April 2016

| United States | 7–10 | Spain |

Westhills Stadium, Langford

16 April 2016

| New Zealand | 31–7 | Spain |

Westhills Stadium, Langford

16 April 2016

| United States | 24–12 | Fiji |

Westhills Stadium, Langford

16 April 2016

| New Zealand | 19–7 | United States |

Westhills Stadium, Langford

16 April 2016

| Fiji | 15–10 | Spain |

Westhills Stadium, Langford

=== Pool C ===
| Team | Pld | W | D | L | PF | PA | PD | Pts |
|---|---|---|---|---|---|---|---|---|
| Canada | 3 | 3 | 0 | 0 | 69 | 0 | +69 | 9 |
| England | 3 | 2 | 0 | 1 | 57 | 32 | +25 | 7 |
| Ireland | 3 | 1 | 0 | 2 | 26 | 69 | -43 | 5 |
| Japan | 3 | 0 | 0 | 3 | 36 | 87 | -51 | 3 |

16 April 2016

| England | 29–5 | Ireland |

Westhills Stadium, Langford

16 April 2016

| Canada | 38–0 | Japan |

Westhills Stadium, Langford

16 April 2016

| England | 28–22 | Japan |

Westhills Stadium, Langford

16 April 2016

| Canada | 26–0 | Ireland |

Westhills Stadium, Langford

16 April 2016

| England | 0–5 | Canada |

Westhills Stadium, Langford

16 April 2016

| Ireland | 21–14 | Japan |

Westhills Stadium, Langford

== Knockout stage ==
=== Bowl ===
Semi-finals
17 April 2016 – Langford
Ireland | 5
Brazil | 10
17 April 2016 – Langford
Fiji | 33
Japan | 10

Final
17 April 2016 – Langford
Brazil | 7
Fiji | 24
Third place
17 April 2016 – Langford
Ireland | 12
Japan | 5

=== Plate ===
Quarter-finals
17 April 2016 – Langford
Australia | 28
Spain | 0
17 April 2016 – Langford
United States | 7
England | 29
17 April 2016 – Langford
New Zealand | 43
Russia | 0
17 April 2016 – Langford
Canada | 12
France | 14

Semi-finals
17 April 2016 – Langford
Spain | 14
United States | 12
17 April 2016 – Langford
Russia | 0
Canada | 27

Final
17 April 2016 – Langford
Spain | 5
Canada | 21
Third place
17 April 2016 – Langford
United States | 15
Russia | 10

=== Cup ===
Quarter-finals
17 April 2016 – Langford
Australia | 28
Spain | 0
17 April 2016 – Langford
United States | 7
England | 29
17 April 2016 – Langford
New Zealand | 43
Russia | 0
17 April 2016 – Langford
Canada | 12
France | 14

Semi-finals
17 April 2016 – Langford
Australia | 5
England | 15
17 April 2016 – Langford
New Zealand | 12
France | 7

Final
17 April 2016 – Langford
England | 31
New Zealand | 14
Third place
17 April 2016 – Langford
Australia | 19
France | 12
