= 2026 France Sevens =

World Rugby Sevens Series tournaments

- 2025–26 SVNS
- Host nation: France

Men
- Date: 5–7 June
- Champion: France
- Runner-up: New Zealand
- Third: Spain

Women
- Date: 5–7 June
- Champion: Australia
- Runner-up: New Zealand
- Third: Canada

Tournament details
- Matches played: 66

The 2026 France Sevens or SVNS BDX is a rugby sevens tournament scheduled to be played at Stade Atlantique in Bordeaux, France. Twelve men's teams and twelve women's teams will participate.

It is the third and final leg of the HSBC SVNS World Championship.

== Men's tournament ==
=== Pool stage ===
Points system: Teams were awarded 3 points for a win, 2 points for a draw and 0 points for a loss. For a loss of 7 points or fewer teams were awarded 1 bonus point.

Key to colours in pool tables
Teams that advanced to the cup quarterfinals
Teams that advanced to the 9th place semifinals

=== Pool A ===
Pos	Team	Pld	W	L	PF	PA	PD	BP	Pts
1	Fiji	3	3	0	72	36	+36	0	9
2	Great Britain	3	2	1	45	45	0	0	6
3	South Africa	3	1	2	52	39	+13	2	5
4	Kenya	3	0	3	22	71	–49	0	0

5 June
14:44

Fiji	31–12	Kenya

Stade Atlantique, Bordeaux

5 June
15:06

South Africa	14–19 (a.e.t.)	Great Britain

Stade Atlantique, Bordeaux

5 June
20:14

Fiji	26–12	Great Britain

Stade Atlantique, Bordeaux

5 June
20:36

South Africa	26–5	Kenya

Stade Atlantique, Bordeaux

6 June
10:44

Kenya	5–14	Great Britain

Stade Atlantique, Bordeaux

6 June
11:06

South Africa	12–15	Fiji

Stade Atlantique, Bordeaux

=== Pool B ===
Pos	Team	Pld	W	L	PF	PA	PD	BP	Pts
1	United States	3	3	0	86	43	+43	0	9
2	Australia	3	2	1	72	41	+31	1	7
3	Spain	3	1	2	71	53	+18	2	5
4	Uruguay	3	0	3	36	128	–92	0	0

5 June
14:00

Spain	19–24	United States

Stade Atlantique, Bordeaux

5 June
14:22

Australia	43–12	Uruguay

Stade Atlantique, Bordeaux

5 June
19:30

Spain	42–17	Uruguay

Stade Atlantique, Bordeaux

5 June
19:52

Australia	17–19	United States

Stade Atlantique, Bordeaux

6 June
10:00

United States	43–7	Uruguay

Stade Atlantique, Bordeaux

6 June
10:22

Australia	12–10	Spain

Stade Atlantique, Bordeaux

=== Pool C ===
Pos	Team	Pld	W	L	PF	PA	PD	BP	Pts
1	New Zealand	3	3	0	83	49	+34	0	9
2	France	3	2	1	57	47	+10	1	7
3	Argentina	3	1	2	70	65	+5	1	4
4	Germany	3	0	3	33	82	–49	1	

5 June
15:28

New Zealand	26–21	France

Stade Atlantique, Bordeaux

5 June
15:50

Argentina	35–19	Germany

Stade Atlantique, Bordeaux

5 June
20:58

New Zealand	33–7	Germany

Stade Atlantique, Bordeaux

5 June
21:20

Argentina	14–22	France

Stade Atlantique, Bordeaux

6 June
11:28

Argentina	21–24	New Zealand

Stade Atlantique, Bordeaux

6 June
11:50

France	14–7	Germany

Stade Atlantique, Bordeaux

=== 9th to 12th playoffs ===
9th place semifinals
6 June – 19:06 – Stade Atlantique
Germany	7
Kenya	5
6 June – 19:28 – Stade Atlantique
Argentina	26
Uruguay	17

9th place final
7 June – 11:56 – Stade Atlantique]
Germany	19
Argentina	47
11th place final
7 June – 11:12 – Stade Atlantique
Kenya	26
Uruguay	7

=== 5th to 8th playoffs ===
Ranking of Cup Quarterfinal Losers
Pos	Team	Original Pool Finish	Pld	PF	PA	PD	Qualification
1	Fiji	1st (Pool A)	4	84	50	+34	Qualified for 5th Place Final
2	United States	1st (Pool B)	4	91	60	+31	Qualified for 5th Place Final
3	Australia	2nd (Pool B)	4	72	69	+3	Qualified for 7th Place Final
4	Great Britain	2nd (Pool A)	4	50	69	–19	Qualified for 7th Place Final
Ranking criteria notes: Teams are ranked primarily by their original pool stage finish. Fiji and United States automatically outrank Australia and Great Britain regardless of statistics due to finishing 1st in their pools rather than 2nd.; Fiji is ranked ahead of United States for having the highest points difference between the two teams across all 3 pool stage matches and cup quarter-final match (Fiji's +34 vs United States' +31).; Australia is ranked ahead of Great Britain for having the highest points difference between the two teams across all 3 pool stage matches and cup quarter-final match (Australia's +3 vs Great Britain's –19).

Fifth Place

7 June
15:26

United States	17–14	Fiji

Stade Atlantique, Bordeaux

Seventh Place

7 June
14:42

Australia	31–0	Great Britain

Stade Atlantique, Bordeaux

=== Cup ===
Quarterfinals
6 June – 15:30 – Stade Atlantique
Australia	0
France	28
6 June – 15:52 – Stade Atlantique
Fiji	12
South Africa	14
6 June – 16:14 – Stade Atlantique
New Zealand	24
Great Britain	5
6 June – 16:36 – Stade Atlantique
United States	5
Spain	17

Semifinals
7 June – 13:14 – Stade Atlantique
France	21
South Africa	12
7 June – 13:36 – Stade Atlantique
New Zealand	24
Spain	12

Final
7 June – 17:41 – Stade Atlantique
France	14
New Zealand	5
Bronze final
7 June – 16:32 – Stade Atlantique
South Africa	14
Spain	40

=== Final placings ===
Place	Team
1st place, gold medalist(s)	France
2nd place, silver medalist(s)	New Zealand
3rd place, bronze medalist(s)	Spain
4	South Africa
5	United States
6	Fiji
7	Australia
8	Great Britain
9	Argentina
10	Germany
11	Kenya
12	Uruguay

== Women's tournament ==
=== Pool stage ===
Points system: Teams were awarded 3 points for a win, 2 points for a draw and 0 points for a loss. For a loss of 7 points or fewer teams were awarded 1 bonus point.

Key to colours in pool tables
Teams that advanced to the cup quarterfinals
Teams that advanced to the 9th place semifinals

=== Pool A ===
Pos	Team	Pld	W	L	PF	PA	PD	BP	Pts
1	New Zealand	3	3	0	129	12	+117	0	9
2	France	3	2	1	56	55	+1	0	6
3	Argentina	3	1	2	32	81	–49	0	3
4	South Africa	3	0	3	12	81	–69	0	0

5 June
12:48

France	22–7	South Africa

Stade Atlantique, Bordeaux

5 June
13:10

New Zealand	49–5	Argentina

Stade Atlantique, Bordeaux

5 June
18:13

New Zealand	42–0	South Africa

Stade Atlantique, Bordeaux

5 June
18:35

France	27–10	Argentina

Stade Atlantique, Bordeaux

6 June
14:16

South Africa	5–17	Argentina

Stade Atlantique, Bordeaux

6 June
14:38

New Zealand	38–7	France

Stade Atlantique, Bordeaux

=== Pool B ===
! Pos ! Team ! Pld ! W ! L ! PF ! PA ! PD ! BP ! Pts |-bgcolor="#cfc" | 1 | align="left" |Australia | 3|| 3|| 0|| 99|| 21|| +78|| 0 ||9 |-bgcolor="#cfc" | 2 | align="left" |Fiji | 3|| 2|| 1|| 59|| 55|| +4|| 0 ||6 |-bgcolor="#cfc" | 3 | align="left" |Japan | 3|| 1|| 2|| 48|| 73|| –25|| 0 ||3 |- | 4 | align="left" |Brazil | 3|| 0|| 3|| 45|| 102|| –57|| 1 ||1 |}

5 June
12:04

Japan	12–24	Fiji

Stade Atlantique, Bordeaux

5 June
12:26

Australia	45–7	Brazil

Stade Atlantique, Bordeaux

5 June
17:29

Japan	29–14	Brazil

Stade Atlantique, Bordeaux

5 June
17:51

Australia	19–7	Fiji

Stade Atlantique, Bordeaux

6 June
13:32

Fiji	28–24	Brazil

Stade Atlantique, Bordeaux

6 June
13:54

Australia	35–7	Japan

Stade Atlantique, Bordeaux

=== Pool C ===
Pos	Team	Pld	W	L	PF	PA	PD	BP	Pts
1	United States	3	3	0	83	44	+39	0	9
2	Canada	3	2	1	71	59	+12	0	6
3	Spain	3	1	2	56	43	+13	2	5
4	Great Britain	3	0	3	31	95	–64	0	0

5 June
11:20

Canada	14–12	Spain

Stade Atlantique, Bordeaux

5 June
11:42

United States	31–7	Great Britain

Stade Atlantique, Bordeaux

5 June
16:45

Canada	35–14	Great Britain

Stade Atlantique, Bordeaux

5 June
17:07

United States	19–15	Spain

Stade Atlantique, Bordeaux

6 June
12:48

Spain	29–10	Great Britain

Stade Atlantique, Bordeaux

13:10

United States	33–22	Canada

Stade Atlantique, Bordeaux

=== 9th to 12th playoffs ===
9th place semifinals
6 June – 19:50 – Stade Atlantique
Brazil	7
Great Britain	19
6 June – 20:12 – Stade Atlantique
Argentina	22
South Africa	17

9th place final
7 June – 11:34 – Stade Atlantique
Great Britain	19
Argentina	31
11th place final
7 June – 10:50 – Stade Atlantique
Brazil	24
South Africa	17

=== 5th to 8th playoffs ===
Ranking of Cup Quarterfinal Losers
Pos	Team	Original Pool Finish	Pld	PF	PA	PD	Qualification
1	Fiji	2nd (Pool B)	4	73	84	−11	Qualified for 5th Place Final
2	France	2nd (Pool A)	4	56	67	−11	Qualified for 5th Place Final
3	Spain	3rd (Pool C)	4	43	44	−1	Qualified for 7th Place Final
4	Japan	3rd (Pool B)	4	43	81	−38	Qualified for 7th Place Final
Ranking criteria notes: Teams are ranked primarily by their original pool stage finish. France and Fiji automatically outrank Spain and Japan regardless of statistics due to finishing 2nd in their pools rather than 3rd.; Fiji is ranked ahead of France because their point differences across all 3 pool stage matches and cup quarter-final match were tied (−11), moving the tie-breaker to cumulative Points For across all 3 pool stage matches and cup quarter-final match (Fiji's 73 vs France's 56).; Spain is ranked ahead of Japan for having the highest points difference between the two teams across all 3 pool stage matches and cup quarter-final match (Spain's –1 vs Japan's –38).

Fifth Place Final

7 June
15:04

Fiji	12–24	France

Stade Atlantique, Bordeaux

Seventh Place Final

7 June
14:20

Spain	7–19	Japan

Stade Atlantique, Bordeaux

=== Cup ===
Quarterfinals
6 June – 17:28 Stade Atlantique
Fiji	14
Canada	29
6 June – 18:12 – Stade Atlantique
New Zealand	35
Japan	22
6 June – 18:34 – Stade Atlantique
United States	12
France	0
6 June – 18:34 – Stade Atlantique
Australia	14
Spain	0

Semifinals
7 June – 12:30 – Stade Atlantique
Canada	17
New Zealand	19
7 June – 12:52 – Stade Atlantique
United States	7
Australia	21

Final
7 June – 17:04 – Stade Atlantique
New Zealand	19
Australia	26
Bronze final
7 June – 16:05 – Stade Atlantique
Canada	21
United States	19

=== Final placings ===
Place	Team
1st place, gold medalist(s)	Australia
2nd place, silver medalist(s)	New Zealand
3rd place, bronze medalist(s)	Canada
4	United States
5	France
6	Fiji
7	Japan
8	Spain
9	Argentina
10	Great Britain
11	Brazil
12	South Africa

2025–26 SVNS
Preceded by 2026 Spain Sevens	2026 France Sevens	Succeeded by none (last tournament)
