= Rhani Hagan =

Australian rugby player (born 2006)

- Born: 11 July 2006 (age 20) Herston, Australia

Rugby union career
Senior career
Years	Team	Apps	(Points)
2023-	Easts Tigers		
National sevens team
Years	Team		Comps
2026-	Australia 7s		

Rhani Hagan (born 11 July 2006) is an Australian rugby union player who plays for the Australia national rugby sevens team.

== Early and personal life ==
Hagan is Quandamooka and Kullilli. From Ipswich, Queensland, she was educated at St Francis Xavier School in Goodna, before attending St Aidan's Anglican Girls' School. She moved to the Eastern Suburbs of Sydney in January 2026.

== Career ==
Hagan played at regional, state and national level in touch football, and also competed in rugby league and athletics as a sprinter, specialising in the 100 metres and 200 metres, before taking up rugby in 2023 at the age of 16 years-old.

Hagan was a member of the Australia team that won the gold medal in sevens rugby at the 2023 Commonwealth Youth Games in Trinidad and Tobago, where she was a try-scorer against Canada in the final. Hagan played club rugby for Easts Tigers Rugby Union in Queensland.

Hagan played for Queensland as they defeated New South Wales in the final of the Next Gen Sevens in 2025 at the age of 19 years-old. Hagan was added to the Australia national rugby sevens team team on a full-time contract in January 2026 during the 2025-26 SVNS. She wore a senior Australia jersey for the first time later that year against New Zealand at the Kick on 7’s and Quadruple header. In August 2026, she signed a new contract with Australia Sevens through to the Los Angeles Olympics in 2028.
