= 2015 Dubai Women's Sevens =

- Women's Sevens Series IV
- Host nation: United Arab Emirates
- Date: 3–4 December 2015

Cup
- Champion: Australia
- Runner-up: Russia
- Third: England

Plate
- Winner: New Zealand
- Runner-up: Canada

Bowl
- Winner: Japan
- Runner-up: Brazil

Tournament details
- Matches played: 34

The 2015 Women's Dubai Sevens was the opening tournament of the 2015–16 World Rugby Women's Sevens Series. It was held on 3–4 December 2015 at The Sevens Stadium in Dubai, and was the fourth edition of the Women's Dubai Sevens as part of the World Rugby Women's Sevens Series.

== Format ==
The teams are drawn into three pools of four teams each. Each team plays every other team in their pool once. The top two teams from each pool advance to the Cup/Plate brackets while the top 2 third place teams also compete in the Cup/Plate. The other teams from each group play-off for the Bowl.

== Teams ==
The participating teams and schedule were announced on 15 October 2014.

- Australia
- Brazil
- Canada
- England
- Fiji
- France
- Ireland
- Japan
- New Zealand
- Russia
- Spain
- United States

== Pool stage ==
Key to colours in group tables
Teams that advanced to the Cup Quarterfinal

=== Pool A ===
Team	Pld	W	D	L	PF	PA	PD	Pts
Russia	3	3	0	0	95	24	+71	9
New Zealand	3	2	0	1	64	50	+14	7
France	3	1	0	2	54	47	+7	5
Brazil	3	0	0	3	10	102	-92	3

3 December 2015
13:04

New Zealand	7 - 33	Russia
	Report

The Sevens, Dubai

3 December 2015
16:00

France	25 - 5	Brazil
	Report

The Sevens, Dubai

3 December 2015
16:22

New Zealand	36 - 5	Brazil
	Report

The Sevens, Dubai

3 December 2015
18:57

France	17 - 21	Russia
	Report

The Sevens, Dubai

3 December 2015
19:19

New Zealand	21 - 12	France
	Report

The Sevens, Dubai

3 December 2015
18:35

Russia	41 - 0	Brazil
	Report

The Sevens, Dubai

=== Pool B ===
Team	Pld	W	D	L	PF	PA	PD	Pts
Fiji	3	3	0	0	75	39	+36	9
Canada	3	2	0	1	62	36	+26	7
Ireland	3	1	0	2	29	49	-20	5
United States	3	0	0	3	29	71	-42	3

3 December 2015
12:20

Canada	10 - 24	Fiji
	Report

The Sevens, Dubai

3 December 2015
12:42

United States	5 - 12	Ireland
	Report

The Sevens, Dubai

3 December 2015
15:16

Canada	17 - 7	Ireland
	Report

The Sevens, Dubai

3 December 2015
15:38

United States	19 - 24	Fiji
	Report

The Sevens, Dubai

3 December 2015
18:13

Canada	35 - 5	United States
	Report

The Sevens, Dubai

3 December 2015
18:35

Fiji	27 - 10	Ireland
	Report

The Sevens, Dubai

=== Pool C ===
Team	Pld	W	D	L	PF	PA	PD	Pts
Australia	3	3	0	0	93	14	+79	9
England	3	2	0	1	56	31	+25	7
Spain	3	1	0	2	40	52	-12	5
Japan	3	0	0	3	12	104	-92	3

3 December 2015
13:48

Australia	26 - 7	Spain

The Sevens, Dubai

3 December 2015
14:10

England	35 - 0	Japan

The Sevens, Dubai

3 December 2015
16:44

Australia	43 - 0	Japan

The Sevens, Dubai

3 December 2015
17:06

England	14 - 7	Spain

The Sevens, Dubai

3 December 2015
19:41

Australia	24 - 7	England

The Sevens, Dubai

3 December 2015
20:03

Spain	26 - 12	Japan

The Sevens, Dubai

== Knockout stage ==
=== Bowl ===
Semi-finals
4 December 2015 – 11:52 – Dubai
Ireland	7
Brazil	29
4 December 2015 – 12:14 – Dubai
United States	14
Japan	15

Final
4 December 2015 – 15:04 – Dubai
Brazil	0
Japan	13
Third place
4 December 2015 – 14:42 – Dubai
Ireland	24
United States	31

=== Plate ===
Quarter-finals
4 December 2015 – 09:00 – Dubai
Russia	24
Spain	0
4 December 2015 – 10:06 – Dubai
Canada	12
England	17
4 December 2015 – 09:44 – Dubai
Australia	15
New Zealand	12
4 December 2015 – 09:22 – Dubai
Fiji	12
France	19

Semi-finals
4 December 2015 – 12:36 – Dubai
Spain	12
Canada	21
4 December 2015 – 12:58 – Dubai
New Zealand	33
Fiji	12

Final
4 December 2015 – 16:35 – Dubai
Canada	19
New Zealand	24
Third place
4 December 2015 – 15:32 – Dubai
Spain	14
Fiji	31

=== Cup ===
Quarter-finals
4 December 2015 – 09:00 – Dubai
Russia	24
Spain	0
4 December 2015 – 10:06 – Dubai
Canada	12
England	17
4 December 2015 – 09:44 – Dubai
Australia	15
New Zealand	12
4 December 2015 – 09:22 – Dubai
Fiji	12
France	19

Semi-finals
4 December 2015 – 13:28 – Dubai
Russia	19
England	12
4 December 2015 – 13:50 – Dubai
Australia	26
France	0

Final
4 December 2015 – 17:28 – Dubai
Russia	12
Australia	31
Third place
4 December 2015 – 17:03 – Dubai
England	10
France	5
