= 2016 São Paulo Women's Sevens =

- Women's Sevens Series IV
- Host nation: Brazil
- Date: 20–21 February 2016

Cup
- Champion: Australia
- Runner-up: Canada
- Third: New Zealand

Plate
- Winner: France
- Runner-up: Fiji

Bowl
- Winner: Russia
- Runner-up: Japan

Tournament details
- Matches played: 34

The 2016 Women's São Paulo Sevens was the second tournament of the 2015–16 World Rugby Women's Sevens Series. It was held between 20 and 21 February 2016 at Arena Barueri in São Paulo, and was the third edition of the Women's São Paulo Sevens as part of the World Rugby Women's Sevens Series.

== Format ==
The teams were drawn into three pools of four teams each. Each team played every other team in their pool once. The top two teams from each pool advanced to the Cup/Plate brackets while the top 2 third place teams also competed in the Cup/Plate. The other teams from each group played play-off for the Bowl.

== Teams ==
The participating teams and schedule were announced on 15 October 2014.

- Australia
- Brazil
- Canada
- England
- Fiji
- France
- Ireland
- Japan
- New Zealand
- Russia
- Spain
- United States

== Pool stage ==
Key to colours in group tables
Teams that advanced to the Cup Quarterfinal

=== Pool A ===
Team	Pld	W	D	L	PF	PA	PD	Pts
Australia	3	3	0	0	74	36	+38	9
Canada	3	2	0	1	64	43	+21	7
Fiji	3	1	0	2	39	57	-18	5
Ireland	3	0	0	3	19	60	-41	3

20 February 2016

Australia	26–17	Fiji

Arena Barueri, São Paulo

20 February 2016

Canada	26–7	Ireland

Arena Barueri, São Paulo

20 February 2016

Australia	19–5	Ireland

Arena Barueri, São Paulo

20 February 2016

Canada	24–7	Fiji

Arena Barueri, São Paulo

20 February 2016

Australia	29–14	Canada

Arena Barueri, São Paulo

20 February 2016

Fiji	15–7	Ireland

Arena Barueri, São Paulo

=== Pool B ===
Team	Pld	W	D	L	PF	PA	PD	Pts
New Zealand	3	3	0	0	121	15	+106	9
United States	3	2	0	1	57	45	+12	7
Spain	3	1	0	2	19	91	-72	5
Russia	3	0	0	3	32	78	-46	3

20 February 2016

Russia	12–19	Spain

Arena Barueri, São Paulo

20 February 2016

New Zealand	35–5	United States

Arena Barueri, São Paulo

20 February 2016

Russia	10–19	United States

Arena Barueri, São Paulo

20 February 2016

New Zealand	46–0	Spain

Arena Barueri, São Paulo

20 February 2016

Russia	10–40	New Zealand

Arena Barueri, São Paulo

20 February 2016

Spain	0–33	United States

Arena Barueri, São Paulo

=== Pool C ===
Team	Pld	W	D	L	PF	PA	PD	Pts
France	3	3	0	0	82	29	+53	9
England	3	2	0	1	74	34	+40	7
Brazil	3	1	0	2	49	58	-9	5
Japan	3	0	0	3	17	101	-84	3

20 February 2016

England	38–5	Japan

Arena Barueri, São Paulo

20 February 2016

France	29–10	Brazil

Arena Barueri, São Paulo

20 February 2016

England	24–12	Brazil

Arena Barueri, São Paulo

20 February 2016

France	36–7	Japan

Arena Barueri, São Paulo

20 February 2016

England	12–17	France

Arena Barueri, São Paulo

20 February 2016

Japan	5–27	Brazil

Arena Barueri, São Paulo

== Knockout stage ==
=== Bowl ===
Semi-finals
21 February 2016 – São Paulo
Spain	7
Japan	17
21 February 2016 – São Paulo
Ireland	0
Russia	15

Final
21 February 2016 – São Paulo
Japan	12
Russia	38
Third place
21 February 2016 – São Paulo
Spain	19
Ireland	0

=== Plate ===
Quarter-finals
21 February 2016 – São Paulo
Australia	10
Fiji	0
21 February 2016 – São Paulo
United States	22
England	12
21 February 2016 – São Paulo
New Zealand	41
Brazil	0
21 February 2016 – São Paulo
France	0
Canada	19

Semi-finals
21 February 2016 – São Paulo
Fiji	26
England	12
21 February 2016 – São Paulo
Brazil	7
France	24

Final
21 February 2016 – São Paulo
Fiji	5
France	17
Third place
21 February 2016 – São Paulo
England	24
Brazil	7

=== Cup ===
Quarter-finals
21 February 2016 – São Paulo
Australia	10
Fiji	0
21 February 2016 – São Paulo
United States	22
England	12
21 February 2016 – São Paulo
New Zealand	41
Brazil	0
21 February 2016 – São Paulo
France	0
Canada	19

Semi-finals
21 February 2016 – São Paulo
Australia	34
United States	0
21 February 2016 – São Paulo
New Zealand	10
Canada	19

Final
21 February 2016 – São Paulo
Australia	29
Canada	0
Third place
21 February 2016 – São Paulo
United States	0
New Zealand	28
