= National Rugby Sevens Championships =

- Sport: Rugby sevens
- Inaugural season: 2012
- Country: Australia

The National Rugby Sevens Championship is an annual rugby sevens competition hosted by the Australian Rugby Union. Tournaments are held for senior men's and women's teams, as well as for junior men's and women's teams with an under-18 age requirement. It is contested by teams from Australian states and territories, and National Indigenous representative sides, as well as teams from the Australian Armed Services, and Australian Universities.

The national women's tournament was launched in its present format in 2012, The inaugural national men's tournament was held in 2015.

== Teams ==
The teams competing at the National Sevens Championships (as at 2015) are:

=== Men ===
- Australian Capital Territory
- (Australia) Australian Universities
- National Indigenous
- New South Wales Blue
- New South Wales White
- Northern Territory
- Queensland Red
- Queensland White
- South Australia
- Tasmania
- (Victoria (state)) Victoria
- Western Australia

=== Women ===
- Australian Capital Territory
- (Australia) Australian Services
- (Australia) Australian Universities
- National Indigenous
- New South Wales Blue
- New South Wales White
- Northern Territory
- Queensland Red
- Queensland White
- South Australia
- (Victoria (state)) Victoria
- Western Australia

== Championship winners ==
=== Men's 7s ===
Year	Winner	Tournament location	Refs
2018	Queensland Red	Ballymore, Brisbane	
2017	Queensland Red	Epsom, Bendigo	
2016	Queensland Red	West Beach, Adelaide	
2015	NSW Blue	Narrabeen, Sydney	

=== Women's 7s ===
Year	Winner	Tournament location	Refs
2018	not held		
2017	NSW Blue	Epsom, Bendigo	
2016	Queensland Red	West Beach, Adelaide	
2015	NSW Blue	Narrabeen, Sydney	
2014	Queensland Red	AIS, Canberra	
2013	ACT	Riverview, Sydney	
2012	Queensland Red	Riverview, Sydney	

=== Men's Youth 7s ===
Year	Winner	Tournament location	Refs
2019	NSW I	Sunshine Coast	
2018	NSW Blue	Ballymore, Brisbane	
2017	NSW Blue	Ballymore, Brisbane	
2016	NSW Blue	McGillvray Oval, Perth	
2015	NSW Blue	Narrabeen, Sydney	
2014	not held		
2013	replaced by AYOF 7s		
National Schoolboy Rugby 7s
2012	Keebra Park SHS	Skilled Park, Gold Coast	

=== Women's Youth 7s ===
Year	Winner	Tournament location	Refs
2019	Queensland I	Sunshine Coast	
2018	NSW Blue	Ballymore, Brisbane	
2017	Queensland Red	Ballymore, Brisbane	
2016	Queensland Red	McGillvray Oval, Perth	
2015	NSW Blue	Narrabeen, Sydney	
2014	not held		
2013	replaced by AYOF 7s		
National Schoolgirl Rugby 7s
2012	Queensland Red	Skilled Park, Gold Coast	

== See also ==
- Australia national rugby sevens team
- Australia women's national rugby sevens team
- Oceania Sevens
- Oceania Women's Sevens Championship
