= 2015–16 World Rugby Women's Sevens Series =

World Rugby Women's Sevens Series IV
- Hosts: United Arab Emirates; Brazil; United States; Canada; France
- Date: 3 Dec 2015 – 29 May 2016

Final positions
- Champions: Australia
- Runners-up: New Zealand

Series details
- Top try scorer: (New Zealand) Portia Woodman (24)
- Top point scorer: (Canada) Ghislaine Landry (158)

The 2015–16 World Rugby Women's Sevens Series was the fourth edition of the World Rugby Women's Sevens Series (formerly the IRB Women's Sevens World Series), an annual series of tournaments organised by World Rugby for women's national teams in rugby sevens. The tour was a companion to the 2015–16 World Rugby Sevens Series for men.

The series was won by Australia who won three tour events on their way to claiming their first World Series title. The previous women's champions New Zealand finished in second place ahead of Canada and England.

== The competition ==
There were five tournament events in 2015–16. Twelve teams competed at each event; eleven being "core" teams, with a twelfth team invited to participate in particular events (similar to previous women's series as well as the men's counterpart). The overall winner of the series was determined by points gained from the standings across the five events.

For the second time, the women's series held a core team qualifying tournament, similar to that held in the men's HSBC Sevens World Series. The qualifying event was held at University College Dublin, in Ireland, and resulted in Japan and the hosts Ireland qualifying as core teams for the main 2015-16 tournament.

=== Teams ===
Eleven "core teams" participated in all series events for the 2015–16 series, the same number as the previous season. The top nine finishers in the 2014–15 series were granted core team status for 2014–15:

- Australia
- Canada
- England
- Fiji
- France
- New Zealand
- Russia
- Spain
- United States

Two additional core teams were determined in a qualifying tournament:

- Ireland
- Japan

=== Events ===
2015–16 Itinerary
Leg	Venue	Dates	Winner
Dubai	The Sevens, Dubai	3–4 December 2015	Australia
Brazil	Arena Barueri, São Paulo	20–21 February 2016	Australia
United States	Fifth Third Bank Stadium, Kennesaw, Georgia (Atlanta)	8–9 April 2016	Australia
Canada	Westhills Stadium, Langford, British Columbia (Victoria)	16–17 April 2016	England
France	Stade Gabriel Montpied, Clermont-Ferrand	28–29 May 2016	Canada

=== Qualifying tournament ===
The core team qualifying tournament was held at the UCD Bowl on 22–23 August 2015.

The qualifier began with a single round-robin pool stage, with teams divided into three four-team pools. The top two teams from each pool, plus the top two third-place finishers, advanced to a knockout stage. The two finalists (the semifinal winners) qualified as core teams for 2015–16.

1. Japan (qualified)
2. Ireland (qualified)
3. South Africa
4. Netherlands
5. Brazil
6. Hong Kong
7. Wales
8. China
9. Kenya
10. Colombia
11. Samoa
12. Mexico

== Points schedule ==
The season championship is determined by points earned in each tournament. The scoring system is the same used in the previous year's series.

- Cup winner (1st place): 20 points
- Cup runner-up (2nd place): 18 points
- Cup third-place play-off winner (3rd place): 16 points
- Cup semi-finalist (4th place): 14 points
- Plate winner (5th place): 12 points
- Plate runner-up (6th place): 10 points
- Plate third-place play-off winner (7th place): 8 points
- Plate semi-finalist (8th place): 6 points
- Bowl winner (9th place): 4 points
- Bowl runner-up (10th place): 3 points
- Bowl third-place play-off winner (11th place): 2 points
- Bowl semi-finalist (12th place): 1 point

In the event of a tournament being abandoned, no series points are allocated.

If two or more teams are level on series points at the end of the season, the following tiebreakers are used to determine placement:

1. Overall difference in points scored and allowed during the season.
2. Total try count during the season.
3. If neither of the above produces a winner, the teams are considered tied.

Source: World Rugby

== Standings ==
Final standings for the 2015–16 series:

2015–16 World Rugby Women's Sevens – Series IV
Pos.	Event Team	Dubai	São Paulo	Atlanta	Langford	Claremont	Points total	Points difference
1st place, gold medalist(s)	Australia	20	20	20	16	18	94	484
2nd place, silver medalist(s)	New Zealand	12	16	18	18	16	80	428
3rd place, bronze medalist(s)	Canada	10	18	14	12	20	74	269
4	England	16	8	16	20	14	74	260
5	France	14	12	8	14	12	60	135
6	United States	2	14	12	8	10	46	–13
7	Russia	18	4	10	6	4	42	–48
8	Fiji	8	10	6	4	6	34	–125
9	Spain	6	2	2	10	8	28	–264
10	Brazil	3	6	–	3	–	12	–247
11	Japan	4	3	3	1	1	12	–392
12	Ireland	1	1	4	2	3	11	–257
13	Kenya	–	–	–	–	2	2	–93
14	Colombia	–	–	1	–	–	1	–137

Source: World Rugby

Legend
Gold	Event Champions
Silver	Event Runner-ups
Bronze	Event Third place finishers
Green	Qualified as a core team for women's rugby sevens 2016–17
No colour	Did not directly qualify for women's rugby sevens 2016–17

== Tournaments ==
=== Dubai ===
Event	Winners	Score	Finalists	Semifinalists
Cup	Australia	31–12	Russia	England (3rd); France
Plate	New Zealand	24–19	Canada	Fiji (7th); Spain
Bowl	Japan	13–0	Brazil	United States (11th); Ireland

=== Brazil ===
Event	Winners	Score	Finalists	Semifinalists
Cup	Australia	29–0	Canada	New Zealand (3rd); United States
Plate	France	15–7	Fiji	England (7th); Brazil
Bowl	Russia	38–12	Japan	Spain (11th); Ireland

=== United States ===
Event	Winners	Score	Finalists	Semifinalists
Cup	Australia	24–19	New Zealand	England (3rd); Canada
Plate	United States	19–7	Russia	France (7th); Fiji
Bowl	Ireland	26–15	Japan	Spain (11th); Colombia

=== Canada ===
Event	Winners	Score	Finalists	Semifinalists
Cup	England	31–14	New Zealand	Australia (3rd); France
Plate	Canada	21–5	Spain	United States (7th); Russia
Bowl	Fiji	24–7	Brazil	Ireland (11th); Japan

=== France ===
Event	Winners	Score	Finalists	Semifinalists
Cup	Canada	29–19	Australia	New Zealand (3rd); England
Plate	France	22–19	United States	Spain (7th); Fiji
Bowl	Russia	24–5	Ireland	Kenya (11th); Japan
