= Amahli Hala =

Australian rugby player (born 2006)

- Born: 28 February 2006 (age 20)

Rugby union career
National sevens team
| Years | Team | Comps |
| 2025- | Australia 7s | |

Amahli-Sieli Hala (born 28 February 2006) is an Australian rugby union player who plays as part of the Australia national rugby sevens team.

== Early life ==
From Queensland, she attended King’s Christian College and Bond University and studied for a Diploma of Health Science. From a rugby family, Hala first started playing sevens rugby when she was 11 years-old.

== Career ==
She was a member of Australia's U18s Girls Sevens side that won the Global Youth Sevens title in Auckland in 2023. That year, she was also part of the Australian Youth Commonwealth Games gold medal team.

In October 2024 she played for Queensland Reds Women’s Sevens in the Next Gen Sevens. She was first called up for Australia national rugby sevens team at the Dubai Sevens in November 2024. She made her debut at the Hong Kong Sevens in the 2024–25 SVNS series against Spain on 28 March 2025. She scored her first international try after three minutes of her debut match. She continued with the Australia sevens team for the 2025-26 season. In October 2026, she signed a contract with the Australian Rugby Sevens team until the 2028 Olympic Games.
