= Mater Dei Special School =

Mater Dei School

Location
- Camden, New South Wales; Australia; 34°01′28″S 150°41′51″E

Information
- School type: Independent co-educational inclusive day school
- Religious affiliations: Catholic Education Diocese of Wollongong; Good Samaritan Education
- Denomination: Roman Catholic
- Established: 1910; 116 years ago (in inner Sydney); 1957; 69 years ago (in Camden)
- Principal: Jennifer Foldes
- Enrolment: 136 (2024)
- Website: www.materdei.org.au

Mater Dei School is an independent Good Samaritan Education co-educational inclusive day school located in the outer south-western Macarthur region of Sydney, in the rural town of Camden, in New South Wales, Australia. The school is part of a broader organisation of the same name, Mater Dei, and provides early intervention and early childhood education for babies and children with a developmental delay, and education and therapy services for children and young people with an intellectual disability.

The school is one of four programs part of Mater Dei: Mater Dei School, as the oldest and original educational offering, NextPath Continuous Learning, NextPath Assessment & Therapy and Mater Dei Early Childhood Education.

== History ==
Mater Dei School was established in 1910 by the Sisters of the Good Samaritan, originally as an orphanage for orphans who lived in the inner city areas of Sydney. In 1957 the Bishop of Wollongong requested to establish a school for girls with intellectual disabilities and the Sisters accepted the request.

The school occupies the site of the historic mansion, Wivenhoe, designed by John Verge and built in 1837 for Charles Cowper and his wife, Eliza.

== See also ==
- List of Catholic schools in New South Wales
- Roman Catholic Diocese of Wollongong
