= Rae Cooper =

Australian professor and researcher

Rachel "Rae" Claire Cooper AO FASSA is an Australian professor, researcher and women's employment specialist.

Cooper is professor of gender, work and employment relations at the University of Sydney Business School. She is Founding Director of the Australian Centre for Gender Equality and Inclusion @ Work . She has previously held a number of leadership roles within the higher education sector.

Cooper researches many aspects of women's working lives including women's labour force participation, gendered career navigation, women in STEM and other male-dominated fields, access to high-quality flexibility and job quality. She has supervised many PhDs across these areas.

Other noteworthy positions Cooper has held throughout her career include editor of Journal of Industrial Relations, president of the Association of Industrial Relations Academics of Australia and New Zealand, executive member of the International Labor and Employment Relations Association, director of Family Planning NSW, Chair of board of directors at Australian Hearing, Deputy chair of the New South Wales Premier's Expert Advisory Council of Women, Director of New South Wales TAFE Commission, and Chair of the management committee of the New South Wales Working Women's Centre.

Cooper is a regular contributor to discussions in the Australian media about gender equality.

For her service to higher education and workplace policy and practice, Cooper was appointed as an Officer of the Order of Australia in the 2019 Queen's Birthday Honours. She was elected a Fellow of the Academy of the Social Sciences in Australia in 2024.

== Publications ==
All publications and grants are available at https://sydney.edu.au/business/about/our-people/academic-staff/rae-cooper.html#
