= 2026 Spain Sevens =

World Rugby Sevens Series tournaments

- 2025–26 SVNS
- Host nation: Spain

Men
- Date: 29–31 May
- Champion: Australia
- Runner-up: South Africa
- Third: Argentina

Women
- Date: 29–31 May
- Champion: Australia
- Runner-up: United States
- Third: New Zealand

Tournament details
- Matches played: 66

The 2026 Spain Sevens or SVNS VLL was a rugby sevens tournament played at Estadio José Zorrilla in Valladolid, Spain. Twelve men's teams and twelve women's teams participated.

It is the second leg of the HSBC SVNS World Championship.

== Men's tournament ==
=== Pool stage ===
Points system: Teams were awarded 3 points for a win, 2 points for a draw and 0 points for a loss. For a loss of 7 points or fewer teams were awarded 1 bonus point.

Key to colours in pool tables
Teams that advanced to the cup quarterfinals
Teams that advanced to the 9th place semifinals

=== Pool A ===
Pos	Team	Pld	W	L	PF	PA	PD	BP	Pts
1	Australia	3	3	0	65	45	+20	0	9
2	South Africa	3	2	1	45	36	+9	0	6
3	Kenya	3	1	2	22	36	–14	1	4
4	Great Britain	3	0	3	40	55	–15	0	3

29 May
12:12

Australia	15–10 (a.e.t.)	Kenya

Estadio José Zorrilla, Valladolid

29 May
12:34

South Africa	17–12 (a.e.t.)	Great Britain

Estadio José Zorrilla, Valladolid

29 May
16:46

Australia	26–21	Great Britain

Estadio José Zorrilla, Valladolid

29 May
17:08

South Africa	14–0	Kenya

Estadio José Zorrilla, Valladolid

30 May
13:01

Kenya	12–7	Great Britain

Estadio José Zorrilla, Valladolid

30 May
13:23

South Africa	14–24	Australia

Estadio José Zorrilla, Valladolid

=== Pool B ===
Pos	Team	Pld	W	L	PF	PA	PD	BP	Pts
1	Argentina	3	3	0	90	31	+59	0	9
2	New Zealand	3	2	1	73	36	+37	0	6
3	Germany	3	1	2	81	59	+22	0	3
4	Uruguay	3	0	3	14	132	–118	0	0

29 May
10:44

New Zealand	40–0	Uruguay

Estadio José Zorrilla, Valladolid

29 May
11:06

Argentina	26–17	Germany

Estadio José Zorrilla, Valladolid

29 May
15:13

New Zealand	33–12	Germany

Estadio José Zorrilla, Valladolid

29 May
15:35

Argentina	40–14	Uruguay

Estadio José Zorrilla, Valladolid

30 May
12:17

Uruguay	0–52	Germany

Estadio José Zorrilla, Valladolid

30 May
12:39

Argentina	24–0	New Zealand

Estadio José Zorrilla, Valladolid

=== Pool C ===
Pos	Team	Pld	W	L	PF	PA	PD	BP	Pts
1	Fiji	3	2	1	57	33	+24	1	7
2	Spain	3	2	1	54	52	+2	1	7
3	France	3	2	1	50	54	–4	0	6
4	United States	3	0	3	42	64	–22	2	2

29 May
13:40

Fiji	26–12	France

Estadio José Zorrilla, Valladolid

29 May
14:02

Spain	26–21	United States

Estadio José Zorrilla, Valladolid

29 May
18:24

Fiji	19–7	United States

Estadio José Zorrilla, Valladolid

29 May
18:46

Spain	14–19	France

Estadio José Zorrilla, Valladolid

30 May
13:50

France	19–14	United States

Estadio José Zorrilla, Valladolid

30 May
14:12

Spain	14–12	Fiji

Estadio José Zorrilla, Valladolid

=== 9th to 12th playoffs ===
9th place semifinals
30 May– 18:54 – Estadio José Zorrilla
Great Britain	21
United States	26
30 May– 19:16 – Estadio José Zorrilla
Germany	24
Uruguay	17

9th place final
31 May– 12:37 – Estadio José Zorrilla
United States	28
Germany	21
11th place final
31 May– 11:53 – Estadio José Zorrilla
Great Britain	17
Uruguay	19

=== 5th to 8th playoffs ===
Ranking of Cup Quarterfinal Losers
Pos	Team	Original Pool Finish	Pld	PF	PA	PD	Qualification
1	Spain	2nd (Pool C)	4	66	66	0	Qualified for 5th Place Final
2	New Zealand	2nd (Pool B)	4	73	76	–3	Qualified for 5th Place Final
3	France	3rd (Pool C)	4	69	75	–6	Qualified for 7th Place Final
4	Kenya	3rd (Pool A)	4	22	57	–35	Qualified for 7th Place Final
Ranking criteria notes: Teams are ranked primarily by their original pool stage finish. Spain and New Zealand automatically outrank France and Kenya regardless of statistics due to finishing 2nd in their pools rather than 3rd.; Spain is ranked ahead of New Zealand for having the highest points difference between the two teams across all 3 pool stage matches and cup quarter-final match (Spain's 0 vs New Zealand's –3).; Australia is ranked ahead of Great Britain for having the highest points difference between the two teams across all 3 pool stage matches and cup quarter-final match (France's –6 vs Kenya's –36).

Fifth Place

31 May
14:20

Spain	12–22	New Zealand

Estadio José Zorrilla, Valladolid

Seventh Place

31 May
13:26

France	14–5	Kenya

Estadio José Zorrilla, Valladolid

=== Cup ===
Quarterfinals
30 May– 16:27 – Estadio José Zorrilla
New Zealand	0
Fiji	40
30 May– 16:49 – Estadio José Zorrilla
Australia	21
Kenya	0
30 May– 17:11 – Estadio José Zorrilla
Spain	12
South Africa	14
30 May– 17:33 – Estadio José Zorrilla
Argentina	21
France	19

Semifinals
31 May– 10:44 – Estadio José Zorrilla
Fiji	14
Australia	21
31 May– 11:06 – Estadio José Zorrilla
South Africa	19
Argentina	7

Final
31 May– 16:26 – Estadio José Zorrilla
Australia	26
South Africa	19
Bronze final
31 May– 15:16 – Estadio José Zorrilla
Fiji	17
Argentina	28

=== Final placings ===
Place	Team
1st place, gold medalist(s)	Australia
2nd place, silver medalist(s)	South Africa
3rd place, bronze medalist(s)	Argentina
4	Fiji
5	New Zealand
6	Spain
7	France
8	Kenya
9	United States
10	Germany
11	Uruguay
12	Great Britain

== Women's tournament ==
=== Pool stage ===
Points system: Teams were awarded 3 points for a win, 2 points for a draw and 0 points for a loss. For a loss of 7 points or fewer teams were awarded 1 bonus point.

Key to colours in pool tables
Teams that advanced to the cup quarterfinals
Teams that advanced to the 9th place semifinals

=== Pool A ===
Pos	Team	Pld	W	L	PF	PA	PD	BP	Pts
1	New Zealand	3	3	0	125	33	+92	0	9
2	Japan	3	2	1	71	64	+7	0	6
3	Brazil	3	1	2	33	71	–38	0	3
4	Argentina	3	0	3	24	85	–61	1	1

29 May
11:28

Japan	24–7	Brazil

Estadio José Zorrilla, Valladolid

29 May
11:50

New Zealand	38–7	Argentina

Estadio José Zorrilla, Valladolid

29 May
16:02

Japan	33–10	Argentina

Estadio José Zorrilla, Valladolid

29 May
16:24

New Zealand	40–12	Brazil

Estadio José Zorrilla, Valladolid

30 May
10:44

Brazil	14–7	Argentina

Estadio José Zorrilla, Valladolid

30 May
11:06

New Zealand	47–14	Japan

Estadio José Zorrilla, Valladolid

=== Pool B ===
Pos	Team	Pld	W	L	PF	PA	PD	BP	Pts
1	Australia	3	2	1	81	31	+50	1	7
2	United States	3	2	1	59	48	+11	1	7
3	Fiji	3	2	1	48	76	–28	0	6
4	South Africa	3	0	3	36	69	–33	1	1

29 May
10:00

United States	19–26	Fiji

Estadio José Zorrilla, Valladolid

29 May
10:22

Australia	26–12	South Africa

Estadio José Zorrilla, Valladolid

29 May
14:29

United States	26–12	South Africa

Estadio José Zorrilla, Valladolid

29 May
14:51

Australia	45–5	Fiji

Estadio José Zorrilla, Valladolid

30 May
10:00

Fiji	17–12	South Africa

Estadio José Zorrilla, Valladolid

30 May
10:22

Australia	10–14	United States

Estadio José Zorrilla, Valladolid

=== Pool C ===
Pos	Team	Pld	W	L	PF	PA	PD	BP	Pts
1	Canada	3	3	0	80	24	+56	0	9
2	France	3	2	1	74	31	+43	0	6
3	Spain	3	1	2	38	68	–30	0	3
4	Great Britain	3	0	3	12	81	–69	0	0

29 May
12:56

Canada	35–5	Spain

Estadio José Zorrilla, Valladolid

29 May
13:18

France	34–0	Great Britain

Estadio José Zorrilla, Valladolid

29 May
17:40

Canada	21–12	Great Britain

Estadio José Zorrilla, Valladolid

29 May
18:02

France	33–7	Spain

Estadio José Zorrilla, Valladolid

30 May
11:33

Spain	26–0	Great Britain

Estadio José Zorrilla, Valladolid

30 May
11:55

France	7–24	Canada

Estadio José Zorrilla, Valladolid

=== 9th to 12th playoffs ===
9th place semifinals
30 May– 18:10 – Estadio José Zorrilla
South Africa	19
Argentina	17
30 May– 18:32 – Estadio José Zorrilla
Brazil	19
Great Britain	17

9th place final
31 May– 11:53 – Estadio José Zorrilla
South Africa	19
Brazil	12
11th place final
31 May– 11:31 – Estadio José Zorrilla
Argentina	24
Great Britain	19

=== 5th to 8th playoffs ===
Ranking of Cup Quarterfinal Losers
Pos	Team	Original Pool Finish	Pld	PF	PA	PD	Qualification
1	France	2nd (Pool C)	4	79	52	+27	Qualified for 5th Place Final
2	Japan	2nd (Pool A)	4	76	104	–28	Qualified for 5th Place Final
3	Fiji	3rd (Pool B)	4	60	116	–56	Qualified for 7th Place Final
4	Spain	3rd (Pool C)	4	45	101	–56	Qualified for 7th Place Final
Ranking criteria notes: Teams are ranked primarily by their original pool stage finish. France and Japan automatically outrank Fiji and Spain regardless of statistics due to finishing 2nd in their pools rather than 3rd.; France is ranked ahead of Japan for having the highest points difference between the two teams across all 3 pool stage matches and cup quarter-final match (France's +27 vs Japan's –28).; Fiji is ranked ahead of Spain because their point differences across all 3 pool stage matches and cup quarter-final match were tied (−56), moving the tie-breaker to cumulative Points For across all 3 pool stage matches and cup quarter-final match (Fiji's 60 vs Spain's 45).

Fifth Place

31 May
13:58

France	29–12	Japan

Estadio José Zorrilla, Valladolid

Seventh Place

31 May
13:04

Fiji	14–5	Spain

Estadio José Zorrilla, Valladolid

=== Cup ===
Quarterfinals
30 May– 14:49 – Estadio José Zorrilla
Australia	21
France	5
30 May– 15:11 – Estadio José Zorrilla
New Zealand	33
Spain	7
30 May– 15:33 – Estadio José Zorrilla
Canada	40
Japan	5
30 May– 15:55 – Estadio José Zorrilla
United States	40
Fiji	12

Semifinals
31 May– 10:00 – Estadio José Zorrilla
Australia	28
New Zealand	26
31 May– 10:22 – Estadio José Zorrilla
Canada	12
United States	14

Final
31 May– 15:38 – Estadio José Zorrilla
Australia	27
United States	14
Bronze final
31 May– 14:54 – Estadio José Zorrilla
New Zealand	50
Canada	14

=== Final placings ===
Place	Team
1st place, gold medalist(s)	Australia
2nd place, silver medalist(s)	United States
3rd place, bronze medalist(s)	New Zealand
4	Canada
5	France
6	Japan
7	Fiji
8	Spain
9	South Africa
10	Brazil
11	Argentina
12	Great Britain

2025–26 SVNS
Preceded by 2026 Hong Kong Sevens	2026 Spain Sevens	Succeeded by 2026 France Sevens
