= Journal of Industrial Relations =

- Discipline: Management, industrial relations
- Language: English
- Edited by: Amanda Pyman and Lucy Taksa

Publication details
- History: 1959-present
- Publisher: SAGE Publishing on behalf of the Australian Labour and Employment Relations Association
- Frequency: 5/year
- Impact factor: 2.3 (2022)

Standard abbreviations
- ISO 4: J. Ind. Relat.

Indexing
- ISSN: 0022-1856 (print); 1472-9296 (web)
- LCCN: 66047057
- OCLC no.: 214959182

Links
- Journal homepage; Online access; Online archive

The Journal of Industrial Relations is a peer-reviewed academic journal published five times a year by SAGE Publishing on behalf of the Australian Labour and Employment Relations Association. It was established in 1958 and the editors-in-chief are Amanda Pyman and Lucy Taksa (Deakin University). The journal covers all aspects of employment relations.

== Abstracting and indexing ==
The journal is abstracted and indexed in Scopus and the Social Sciences Citation Index. According to the Journal Citation Reports, the journal has a 2022 impact factor of 2.3.
