= 2026–27 SVNS =

Series of national rugby sevens tournaments

2025–26 SVNS
- Men's Series XXVIII; Women's Series XIV
- Hosts: United Arab Emirates; South Africa; Singapore; Australia; Canada; United States; Hong Kong (Grand Final); Spain (Grand Final); France (Grand Final)
- Date: 29 November 2026 – 30 May 2027
- Nations: 8

The 2026–27 SVNS is the 27th annual series of rugby sevens tournaments for national sevens teams, known as the SVNS. It is taking place between November 2026 and May 2027. The SVNS has been run by World Rugby since 1999.This season doubled as a qualifier for the 2028 Olympic Games, with the top four countries in Grand Final Stage, excluding hosts United States, who are already qualified for being the host nation, qualifying automatically

== Teams and format ==
The number of teams are the same as last season with 8 for both men's and women's. By both the men's and women's one team was relegated and one team promoted. On the men's side, Great Britain was relegated and the United States promoted. On the women's side, Great Britain was relegated and Spain was promoted. Both the men's and women's Great Britain was relegated for finishing in the bottom 4 in the grand finals.

The tournament takes place over six months and consists of 9 events, with the final three events making up the Grand Finals, and consisting of the 8 Division 1 teams, and the top 4 SVNS Division 2 teams.

=== Men's teams ===
- Argentina
- Australia
- Fiji
- France
- New Zealand
- South Africa
- Spain
- United States

=== Women's teams ===
- Australia
- Canada
- Fiji
- France
- Japan
- New Zealand
- Spain
- United States

== Tour venues ==
The schedule for the series was finalised on 29 July 2026.

2026–27 itinerary
Leg	Stadium	City	Dates	Men's Winner	Women's Winner
Dubai	The Sevens Stadium	Dubai	28–29 Nov 2026		
South Africa	DHL Stadium	Cape Town	5–6 Dec 2026		
Singapore	National Stadium	Singapore	30–31 Jan 2027		
Australia	HBF Park	Perth	6–7 Feb 2027		
Canada	BC Place	Vancouver	6–7 Mar 2027		
United States	Sports Illustrated	New York (Note: Physical location is Harrison, New Jersey.)	13–14 Mar 2027		
Hong Kong	Kai Tak Sports Park	Hong Kong	9–11 Apr 2027		
Spain	José Zorrilla Stadium	Valladolid	21–23 May 2027		
France	Stade Atlantique	Bordeaux	28–30 May 2027		

== Standings ==
The points awarded to teams at each event, as well as the overall season totals, are shown in the table below. Gold indicates the event champions. Silver indicates the event runner-ups. Bronze indicates the event third place finishers. An asterisk (*) indicates a tied placing. A dash (—) is recorded where a team did not compete.

=== Men's ===
2026–27 SVNS – Men's Series XXVIII
Pos.	Event Team	Dubai	Cape Town	Singapore	Perth	Vancouver	New York	Points total	Points difference
1	Argentina								
2	Australia								
3	Fiji								
4	France								
5	New Zealand								
6	South Africa								
7	Spain								
8	United States								

Legend
Gold	Event Champions
Silver	Event Runner-ups
Bronze	Event Third place finishers
No colour	Core team and re-qualified as a core team for the 2027–28 SVNS

=== Women's ===
2025–26 SVNS – Women's Series XIV
Pos.	Event Team	Dubai	Cape Town	Singapore	Perth	Vancouver	New York	Points total	Points difference
1	Australia								
2	Canada								
3	Fiji								
4	France								
5	Japan								
6	New Zealand								
7	Spain								
8	United States								

Legend
Gold	Event Champions
Silver	Event Runner-ups
Bronze	Event Third place finishers
No colour	Core team and re-qualified as a core team for the 2027–28 SVNS

=== Men's Grand Finals ===
2025–26 SVNS – Men's Series XXVIII
Pos.	Event Team	Hong Kong	Valladolid	Bordeaux	Points total	Points difference
1						
2						
3						
4						
5						
6						
7						
8						
9						
10						
11						
12						

Legend
Gold	Event Champions
Silver	Event Runner-ups
Bronze	Event Third place finishers
Green	Qualified for 2027–28 SVNS
No colour	Qualified for 2028 SVNS 2
Qualification for the 2028 Olympic Sevens
Qualified as one of the four highest-placed eligible teams in the 2027 Grand Finals
Automatically qualified (host country United States)

=== Women's Grand Finals ===
2025–26 SVNS – Women's Series XIV
Pos.	Event Team	Hong Kong	Valladolid	Bordeaux	Points total	Points difference
1						
2						
3						
4						
5						
6						
7						
8						
9						
10						
11						
12						

Legend
Gold	Event Champions
Silver	Event Runner-ups
Bronze	Event Third place finishers
Green	Qualified for 2027–28 SVNS
No colour	Qualified for 2028 SVNS 2
Qualification for the 2028 Olympic Sevens
Qualified as one of the four highest-placed eligible teams in the 2027 Grand Finals
Automatically qualified (host country United States)

== Placings summary ==
Tallies of top-four placings in tournaments during the 2026–27 series, by team:

=== Men ===
Team	(gold) Gold	(silver) Silver	(bronze) Bronze	Fourth	Total

=== Women ===
Team	(gold) Gold	(silver) Silver	(bronze) Bronze	Fourth	Total

== Players ==
Player of the final award
Tour Leg	Men's Winner	Women's Winner	Ref.
Dubai			
Cape Town			
Singapore			
Perth			
Vancouver			
New York			
Hong Kong			
Valladolid			
Bordeaux			

=== Awards ===
Rookie of the Year Award
Men's Winner	Women's Winner	Ref.

Player of the Year Award
Men's Winner	Women's Winner	Ref.

Dream Team
Men's Dream Team	Women's Dream Team	Ref.

== Tournaments ==
=== Dubai ===
==== Men's ====
Event	Winner	Score	Finalist
Cup			
Bronze			
Fifth Place			
Seventh Place			

==== Women's ====
Event	Winner	Score	Finalist
Cup			
Bronze			
Fifth Place			
Seventh Place			

=== Cape Town ===
==== Men's ====
Event	Winner	Score	Finalist
Cup			
Bronze			
Fifth Place			
Seventh Place			

==== Women's ====
Event	Winner	Score	Finalist
Cup			
Bronze			
Fifth Place			
Seventh Place			

=== Singapore ===
==== Men's ====
Event	Winner	Score	Finalist
Cup			
Bronze			
Fifth Place			
Seventh Place			

==== Women's ====
Event	Winner	Score	Finalist
Cup			
Bronze			
Fifth Place			
Seventh Place			

=== Perth ===
==== Men's ====
Event	Winner	Score	Finalist
Cup			
Bronze			
Fifth Place			
Seventh Place			

==== Women's ====
Event	Winner	Score	Finalist
Cup			
Bronze			
Fifth Place			
Seventh Place			

=== Vancouver ===
==== Men's ====
Event	Winner	Score	Finalist
Cup			
Bronze			
Fifth Place			
Seventh Place			

==== Women's ====
Event	Winner	Score	Finalist
Cup			
Bronze			
Fifth Place			
Seventh Place			

=== New York ===
==== Men's ====
Event	Winner	Score	Finalist
Cup			
Bronze			
Fifth Place			
Seventh Place			

==== Women's ====
Event	Winner	Score	Finalist
Cup			
Bronze			
Fifth Place			
Seventh Place			

=== Hong Kong ===
==== Men's ====
Event	Winner	Score	Finalist
Cup			
Bronze			
Fifth Place			
Seventh Place			
Ninth Place			
Eleventh Place			

==== Women's ====
Event	Winner	Score	Finalist
Cup			
Bronze			
Fifth Place			
Seventh Place			
Ninth Place			
Eleventh Place			

=== Valladolid ===
==== Men's ====
Event	Winner	Score	Finalist
Cup			
Bronze			
Fifth Place			
Seventh Place			
Ninth Place			
Eleventh Place			

==== Women's ====
Event	Winner	Score	Finalist
Cup			
Bronze			
Fifth Place			
Seventh Place			
Ninth Place			
Eleventh Place			

=== Bordeaux ===
==== Men's ====
Event	Winner	Score	Finalist
Cup			
Bronze			
Fifth Place			
Seventh Place			
Ninth Place			
Eleventh Place			

==== Women's ====
Event	Winner	Score	Finalist
Cup			
Bronze			
Fifth Place			
Seventh Place			
Ninth Place			
Eleventh Place			
