= Australia women's national rugby sevens team =

Australia
- Full name: Australia Women's Sevens
- Union: Rugby Australia
- Nickname: Aussie Women's Sevens
- Coach: Reg Tayler
- Captain: Charlotte Caslick
- Most caps: Charlotte Caslick (329)
- Top scorer: Maddison Levi (1,020)
- Most tries: Maddison Levi (204)
| 1st kit | 2nd kit |

World Cup Sevens
- Appearances: 4 (First in 2009)
- Best result: Champions (2009 and 2022)

Official website
- au7s.rugby

Medal record

Olympic Games
| Gold medal – first place | 2016 Rio de Janeiro | Team |

Commonwealth Games
| Gold medal – first place | 2022 Birmingham | Team |
| Silver medal – second place | 2018 Gold Coast | Team |

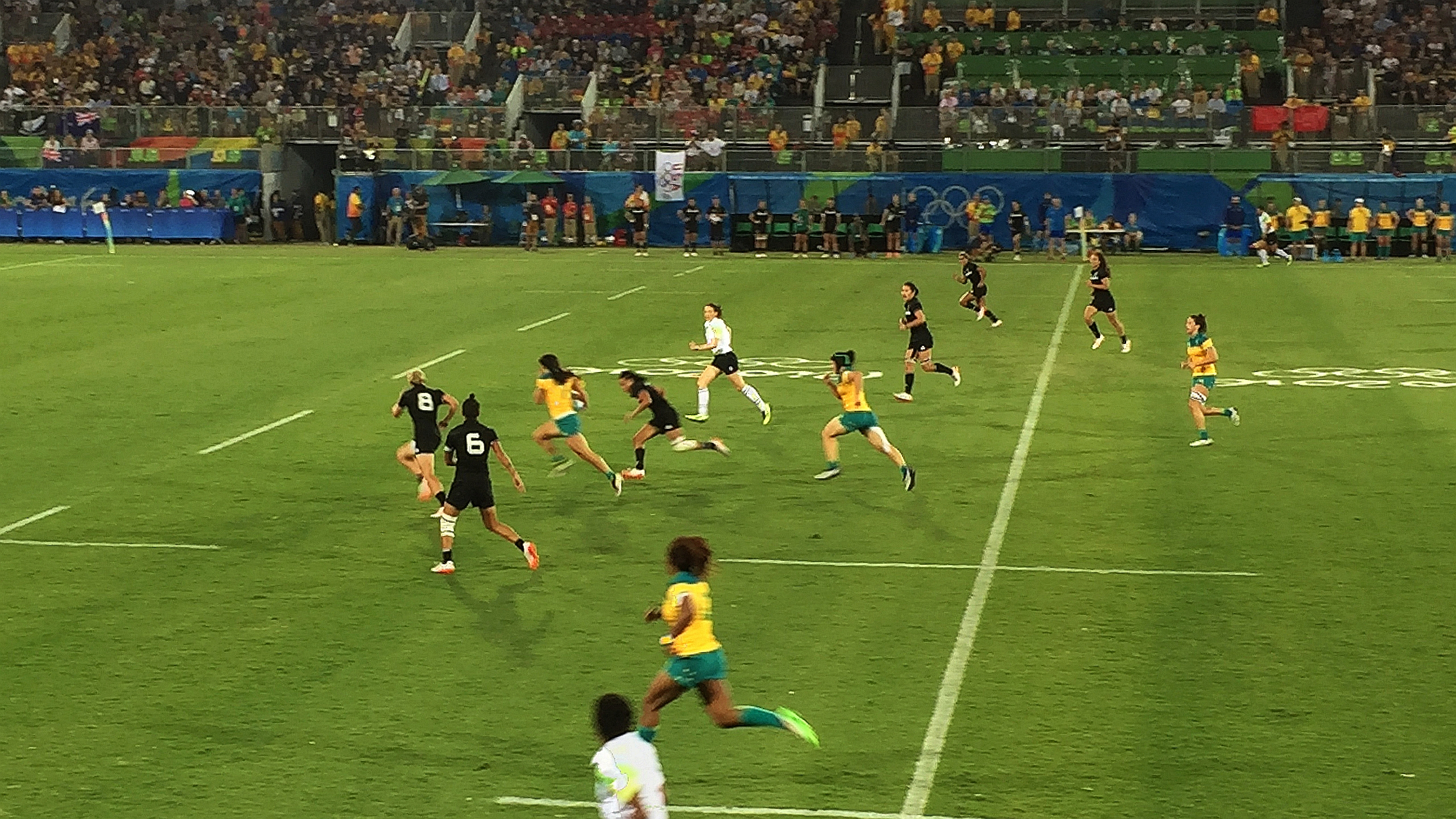
Australia with possession during the women's final at the 2016 Olympic Sevens.

The Australia women's national rugby sevens team, are the Australia national rugby sevens team of women. They were champions of the inaugural Women's Sevens World Cup in 2009. The team plays in the World Rugby Women's Sevens Series as one of the "core teams" on the world tour, of which they have been crowned Champions three times. The team also played in the preceding competition to the current world series, the IRB Women's Sevens Challenge Cup. In 2016, they won the inaugural gold medal at the Rio Summer Olympics.

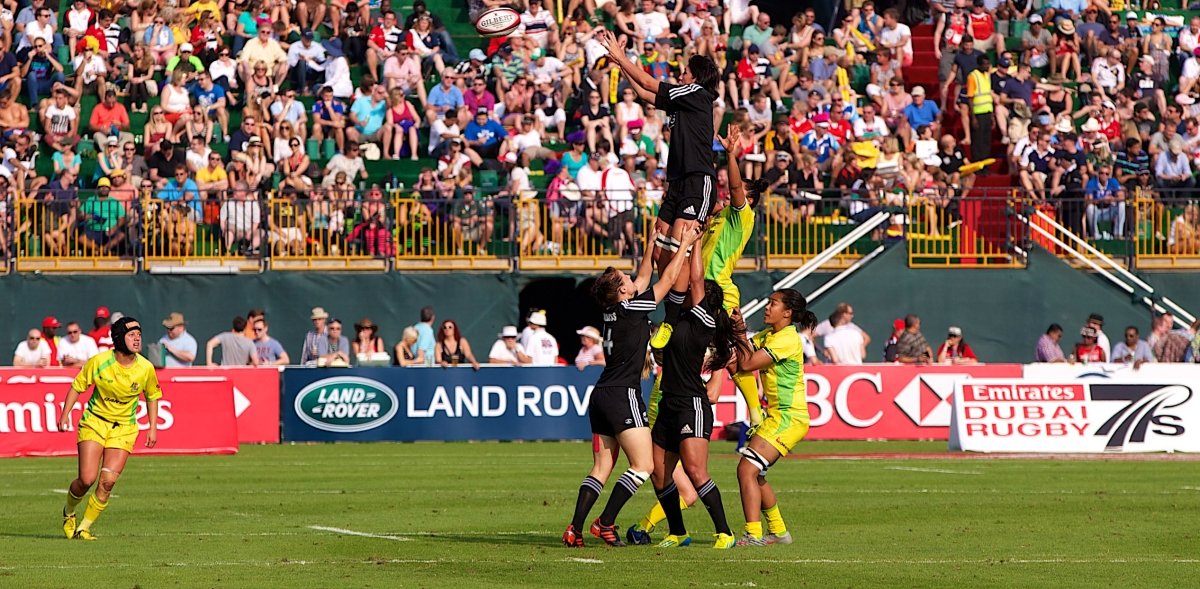
Australia vs New Zealand at the Dubai Sevens

== History ==
=== Team name ===
The national sevens side is known as Australia and, as confirmed by captain Sharni Williams, does not have a nickname as of 2015. The team was sometimes referred to as the Pearls in sections of the media, but that name refers to Australia's developmental sevens side rather than the official national team. As of 2015, the developmental team also competes in the Pacific Games Sevens.

=== 2022 ===
Australia won the 2021–22 Women's Sevens Series title, they then won the Commonwealth Games in Birmingham, and were later crowned champions of the Rugby World Cup Sevens completing 2022 with a historic clean sweep of every major tournament.

== Honours ==
Australia has won the following: World Rugby Sevens Series

- Champion: 2016, 2018, 2022
- Runner-up: 2014, 2017, 2020

World Cup Sevens

- Champion: 2009, 2022

Rugby sevens at the Summer Olympics

- Gold medal: 2016

Rugby sevens at the Commonwealth Games

- Gold medal: 2022
- Silver medal: 2018

Major tournament wins

- Australia Sevens: 2018
- Brazil Sevens: 2014, 2016
- Canada Sevens: 2022
- Dubai Sevens: 2013, 2015, 2017, 2021^{I}, 2021^{II}, 2022, 2023
- Hong Kong Sevens: 2009
- London Sevens: 2016
- Spain Sevens: 2022^{II}
- United States Sevens: 2016

Regional tournament wins

- Oceania Sevens: 2008, 2013, 2016, 2018, 2019
- Asia-Pacific Championship: 2012

In 2016, the Australian women's sevens team was named Team of the Year at the Australian Institute of Sport Performance Awards.

== Tournament record ==
A red box around the year indicates tournaments played within Australia

=== World Cup Sevens ===
Rugby World Cup 7s
| Year | Round | Position | P | W | L | D |
|---|---|---|---|---|---|---|
| (United Arab Emirates) 2009 | Final | 1st place, gold medalist(s) | 6 | 5 | 1 | 0 |
| (Russia) 2013 | Plate final | 5 | 6 | 5 | 1 | 0 |
| (United States) 2018 | Third playoff | 3rd place, bronze medalist(s) | 4 | 3 | 1 | 0 |
| (South Africa) 2022 | Final | 1st place, gold medalist(s) | 4 | 4 | 0 | 0 |
| Total | 2 Titles | 4/4 | 20 | 17 | 3 | 0 |

=== Commonwealth Games ===
Commonwealth Games 7s
| Year | Round | Position | P | W | L | D |
|---|---|---|---|---|---|---|
| (Australia) 2018 | Final | 2nd place, silver medalist(s) | 5 | 4 | 1 | 0 |
| (England) 2022 | Final | 1st place, gold medalist(s) | 5 | 4 | 1 | 0 |
| Total | 1 Title | 2/2 | 10 | 8 | 2 | 0 |

=== Pacific Games ===
Pacific Games 7s
| Year | Round | Position | P | W | L | D |
|---|---|---|---|---|---|---|
| (New Caledonia) 2011 | Not Eligible | | | | | |
| (Papua New Guinea) 2015^{^{a}} | Final | 2nd place, silver medalist(s) | 7 | 6 | 1 | 0 |
| (Samoa) 2019^{^{a}} | Final | 2nd place, silver medalist(s) | 7 | 6 | 1 | 0 |
| Total | 0 Titles | 2/3 | 14 | 12 | 2 | 0 |

=== Olympic Games ===
Olympic Games 7s
| Year | Round | Position | P | W | L | D |
|---|---|---|---|---|---|---|
| (Brazil) 2016 | Final | 1st place, gold medalist(s) | 6 | 5 | 0 | 1 |
| (Japan) 2020 | Fifth playoff | 5 | 6 | 4 | 2 | 0 |
| (France) 2024 | Bronze playoff | 4 | 6 | 4 | 2 | 0 |
| Total | 1 Title | 3/3 | 18 | 13 | 4 | 1 |

=== Oceania Women's Sevens ===
Oceania Women's 7s
| Year | Round | Position | P | W | L | D |
|---|---|---|---|---|---|---|
| (Samoa) 2008 | Final | 1st place, gold medalist(s) | 6 | 6 | 0 | 0 |
| (Fiji) 2012 | Final | 2nd place, silver medalist(s) | 6 | 5 | 1 | 0 |
| (Australia) 2013 | Final | 1st place, gold medalist(s) | 6 | 6 | 0 | 0 |
| (Australia) 2014 | Final | 2nd place, silver medalist(s) | 8 | 6 | 2 | 0 |
| (New Zealand) 2015 | Did Not Attend | | | | | |
| (Fiji) 2016 | Final | 1st place, gold medalist(s) | 6 | 6 | 0 | 0 |
| (Fiji) 2017 | Final | 2nd place, silver medalist(s) | 5 | 4 | 1 | 0 |
| (Fiji) 2018 | Final | 1st place, gold medalist(s) | 5 | 5 | 0 | 0 |
| (Fiji) 2019 | Final | 1st place, gold medalist(s) | 5 | 5 | 0 | 0 |
| (Australia) 2021 | Round-robin | 2nd place, silver medalist(s) | 6 | 3 | 3 | 0 |
| (New Zealand) 2022^{^{a}} | Round-robin | 2nd place, silver medalist(s) | 6 | 4 | 2 | 0 |
| (Australia) 2023 | Final | 1st place, gold medalist(s) | 6 | 5 | 0 | 1 |
| Total | 6 Titles | 11/12 | 65 | 56 | 9 | 1 |

Notes:

^^{a} Australia VII or development team entered

=== World Series record ===
World Rugby Women's Sevens Series
| Season | Rounds | Position | Points |
|---|---|---|---|
| 2012–13 | 4 | 5th | 46 |
| 2013–14 | 5 | 2nd place, silver medalist(s) | 92 |
| 2014–15 | 6 | 3rd place, bronze medalist(s) | 94 |
| 2015–16 | 5 | 1st place, gold medalist(s) | 94 |
| 2016–17 | 6 | 2nd place, silver medalist(s) | 100 |
| 2017–18 | 5 | 1st place, gold medalist(s) | 92 |
| 2018–19 | 6 | 4th | 86 |
| 2019–20 | 5 | 2nd place, silver medalist(s) | 80 |
| 2021 | Season was cancelled due to impacts of COVID-19 pandemic. | | |
| 2021–22 | 6 | 1st place, gold medalist(s) | 114 |
| 2022–23 | 7 | 2nd place, silver medalist(s) | 118 |

== Players ==
=== Current squad ===
The contracted squad for the 2025–26 SVNS.

Australia Women 7's

| # | Player | Date of birth | Club |
|---|---|---|---|
| 1 | Piper Simons | 27 July 2005 | Seaforth Raiders |
| 2 | Amahli Hala | 28 February 2006 | Unattached |
| 3 | Faith Nathan | 27 July 2000 | Unattached |
| 4 | Mackenzie Davis | 3 January 2005 | Unattached |
| 5 | Teagan Levi | 14 August 2003 | Unattached |
| 6 | Madison Ashby (C) | 22 January 2001 | Unattached |
| 7 | Charlotte Caslick | 9 March 1995 | Unattached |
| 8 | Kaitlin Shave | 29 January 2001 | University of Queensland |
| 9 | Tia Hinds | 5 November 2002 | Unattached |
| 10 | Isabella Nasser (C) | 28 August 2002 | University of Queensland |
| 11 | Demi Kennewell | 25 March 1998 | Unattached |
| 12 | Maddison Levi | 27 April 2002 | Unattached |
| 13 | Heidi Dennis | 24 March 2005 | Unattached |
| 14 | Bridget Clark | 16 January 2003 | Unattached |
| 15 | Kahli Henwood | 1 October 1999 | Unattached |
| 21 | Maya Stewart | 14 March 2000 | NSW Waratahs Women |
| 22 | Bienne Terita | 16 May 2003 | Unattached |
| 23 | Ruby Nicholas | 9 August 2004 | Unattached |
| 28 | Kiiahla Duff | 28 August 2003 | Unattached |
| 55 | Alysia Lefau-Fakaosilea | 5 November 2000 | Unattached |
| 65 | Sariah Paki | 12 October 2001 | Unattached |
| 98 | Sidney Taylor | 22 August 2002 | Unattached |
| TBD | Rhani Hagan | | Unattached |

2025–26 SVNS

=== Captains ===
| Name | Years | Refs |
|---|---|---|
| Maddison Levi | 2024 | |
| Shannon Parry | 2018 | |

== Player records ==
The following shows leading career Australian players based on performance in the Women's SVNS. Players in bold are still active.

Tries scored
| No. | Player | Tries |
|---|---|---|
| 1 | **Maddison Levi** | 204 |
| 2 | **Charlotte Caslick** | 187 |
| 3 | Ellia Green | 141 |
| 4 | Emilee Cherry | 131 |
| 5 | **Faith Nathan** | 126 |

Points scored
| No. | Player | Points |
|---|---|---|
| 1 | **Maddison Levi** | 1,020 |
| 2 | **Charlotte Caslick** | 937 |
| 3 | Ellia Green | 739 |
| 4 | Emilee Cherry | 719 |
| 5 | Sharni Williams | 677 |

Matches played
| No. | Player | Matches |
|---|---|---|
| 1 | **Charlotte Caslick** | 329 |
| 2 | Sharni Williams | 275 |
| 3 | Dominique du Toit | 188 |
| 4 | Shannon Parry | 187 |
| 5 | Alicia Lucas | 186 |

=== Award winners ===
The following Australia Sevens players have been recognised at the World Rugby Awards since 2013:

World Rugby Women's 7s Player of the Year
| Year | Nominees | Winners |
|---|---|---|
| 2014 | Charlotte Caslick | **Emilee Cherry** |
| 2014 | Emilee Cherry | **Emilee Cherry** |
| 2015 | Charlotte Caslick (2) | — |
| 2016 | Charlotte Caslick (3) | **Charlotte Caslick** |
| 2022 | Charlotte Caslick (4) | **Charlotte Caslick** (2) |
| 2022 | Maddison Levi | **Charlotte Caslick** (2) |
| 2022 | Faith Nathan | **Charlotte Caslick** (2) |
| 2023 | Maddison Levi (2) | — |
| 2024 | Maddison Levi (3) | **Maddison Levi** |

World Rugby Women's 7s Dream Team
| Year | No. | Player |
|---|---|---|
| 2024 | 4. | Maddison Levi |
| 2025 | 4. | Maddison Levi (2) |
| 2025 | 6. | Isabella Nasser |

== Coaches ==
| Name | Tenure | Refs |
|---|---|---|
| Chris Lane | 2011–2013 | |
| Tim Walsh | 2013–2018 | |
| John Manenti | 2018–2021 | |
| Tim Walsh | 2022–2026 | |
| Reg Tayler | 2026–present | |

== See also ==
- Australia women's national rugby union team
- National Rugby Sevens Championships
- National Women's Rugby Championship
- Super W
