= 2024–25 SVNS squads =

International rugby sevens

SVNS 2024–25 squads

This is a list of the complete squads for the 2024–25 SVNS.

Legend
Gold	Indicates the captains for a tournament
–	Indicates that a player did not play in the tournament

== Argentina ==
Men's Head Coach: (Argentina) Santiago Gómez Cora
Women's Head Coach: (Argentina) Facundo Salas

Argentina men's team members 2024–25
Player	Jersey number by tournament						
Player	Dubai	Cape Town	Perth	Vancouver	Hong Kong	Singapore	Los Angeles
Facundo Pueyrredon	21	21	21	–	–	21	–
Agustín Fraga	5	5	5	5	5	5	5
Santiago Mare	10	10	10	10	10	10	10
Luciano González	11	11	11	11	11	11	11
Santino Zangara	23	23	–	23	23	23	23
Gregorio Perez Pardo	4	–	–	–	–	–	–
Germán Schulz	3	3	–	3	3	3	3
Marcos Moneta	13	13	13	13	13	13	13
Joaquín Pellandini	14	14	14	14	14	14	14
Matías Osadczuk	9	9	9	9	9	9	9
Santiago Vera Feld	2	2	2	–	–	–	2
Santiago Álvarez	6	6	6	6	6	6	6
Tobías Wade	7	7	7	7	7	7	7
Matteo Graziano	–	1	1	1	1	1	1
Tomas Elizalde	–	–	22	22	22	22	–
Alejo Lavayen	–	–	–	8	8	–	–
Lautaro Bazán	–	–	–	–	–	–	12

Argentina women's team members 2024–25
Player	Jersey number by tournament
Player	Los Angeles
Ceci Altini	1
Virginia Brigido	9
Cande Delgado	8
Male Díaz	14
Cristal Escalante	12
Sofia Gonzalez	10
Milagros Lecuona	23
Azul Medina	6
Andrea Moreno	7
Pula Pedrozo	4
Antonella Reding	11
Talía Rodich	13
María Taladrid	3
Brisa Trisgo	5

== Australia ==
Men's Head Coach: (New Zealand) Liam Barry
Women's Head Coach: (Australia) Tim Walsh

Australia men's team members 2024–25
Player	Jersey number by tournament						
Player	Dubai	Cape Town	Perth	Vancouver	Hong Kong	Singapore	Los Angeles
Henry Hutchison	1	1	1	1	1	1	1
Ben Dowling	2	2	2	2	2	2	2
Matt Gonzalez	9	9	9	9	9	9	9
Aden Ekanayake	23	23	23	23	23	23	23
James McGregor	7	7	–	–	–	–	–
Michael Icely	87	87	87	87	–	–	87
Henry Paterson	6	6	–	6	6	6	6
Ben Dalton	10	10	10	10	10	10	10
Hayden Sargeant	25	25	25	25	25	25	25
Nathan Lawson	12	–	–	–	–	–	–
James Turner	14	14	14	14	14	14	14
Henry Palmer	3	3	–	–	–	–	–
Sidney Harvey	15	15	15	15	15	15	–
Jayden Blake	–	13	13	13	13	13	13
Josh Turner	–	–	29	29	29	29	29
Hadley Tonga	–	–	71	–	71	71	–
Maurice Longbottom	–	–	11	11	11	11	11
Wallace Charlie	–	–	–	–	–	–	77

Australia women's team members 2024–25
Player	Jersey number by tournament						
Player	Dubai	Cape Town	Perth	Vancouver	Hong Kong	Singapore	Los Angeles
Kahli Henwood	15	15	15	15	15	15	15
Maddison Levi	12	12	12	–	12	12	12
Demi Hayes	11	–	11	11	–	–	11
Heidi Dennis	13	13	13	13	–	–	13
Ruby Nicholas	23	23	23	23	23	23	23
Faith Nathan	3	3	3	3	3	3	3
Sariah Paki	65	65	–	–	65	65	65
Kiiahla Duff	28	28	28	28	28	28	28
Teagan Levi	5	5	5	5	5	5	5
Piper Simons	1	1	1	1	1	1	1
Charlotte Caslick	7	7	7	7	–	–	–
Isabella Nasser	10	10	10	10	10	–	10
Tia Hinds	9	9	9	9	9	9	–
Mackenzie Davis	–	4	4	4	4	4	4
Bridget Clark	–	–	–	14	14	14	14
Amahli Hala	–	–	–	–	2	2	–
Bienne Terita	–	–	–	–	–	22	–

== Brazil ==
Women's Head Coach: (New Zealand) Crystal Kaua

Brazil women's team members 2024–25
Player	Jersey number by tournament						
Player	Dubai	Cape Town	Perth	Vancouver	Hong Kong	Singapore	Los Angeles
Leila dos Santos Silva	4	4	4	4	4	4	4
Raquel Kochhann	10	10	10	10	10	10	10
Camila Carvalho	77	77	77	77	77	77	77
Giovanna Moreira	95	95	—	95	95	95	95
Gabriela Lima	9	9	9	–	–	–	–
Marina Fioravanti	8	8	—	8	8	8	–
Mariana Nicolau	1	1	1	1	1	1	–
Bianca Silva	11	11	—	11	11	11	11
Thalia Costa	5	5	5	5	5	5	5
Thalita Costa	13	13	13	13	13	13	13
Anne Santos	23	23	23	–	–	–	23
Isadora Lopes de Souza	6	6	6	6	6	6	6
Yasmim Soares	22	22	22	22	22	22	22
Lohana Valente	—	—	20	–	–	–	–
Andressa Alves	—	—	21	21	21	21	21
Gisele Gomes	—	—	18	–	–	–	18
Marcelle Souza	—	—	–	12	12	12	–
Larissa Carvalho	—	—	–	–	–	–	27

== Canada ==
Women's Head Coach: (Canada) Jocelyn Barrieau

Canada women's team members 2024–25
Player	Jersey number by tournament						
Player	Dubai	Cape Town	Perth	Vancouver	Hong Kong	Singapore	Los Angeles
Piper Logan	11	11	11	11	–	–	–
Savannah Bauder	26	26	—	–	–	–	26
Monique Coffey	55	55	—	–	–	–	–
Asia Hogan-Rochester	24	24	24	24	–	–	24
Carmen Izyk	8	8	8	–	8	8	8
Breanne Nicholas	4	4	4	4	4	4	4
Maya Addai	20	20	—	–	–	–	–
Shalaya Valenzuela	23	23	—	23	23	23	23
Mahalia Robinson	29	29	29	29	29	29	29
Shoshanah Seumanutafa	25	25	25	–	–	–	–
Camille Arvin-Berod	17	17	17	–	–	–	–
Pamphinette Buisa	99	99	—	99	–	–	–
Carissa Norsten	19	19	19	19	19	19	19
Larah Wright	—	—	47	–	–	–	47
Florence Symonds	—	—	7	7	7	7	7
Olivia Apps	—	—	9	9	9	9	9
Olivia Sarabura	—	—	27	27	–	–	–
Gabrielle Senft	—	—	88	–	–	–	–
Charity Williams	—	—	–	6	–	–	6
Fancy Bermudez	—	—	–	10	10	10	–
Alysha Corrigan	—	—	–	16	–	–	16
Sabrina Poulin	—	—	–	–	22	22	22
Vanessa Chiappetta	—	—	–	–	3	3	–
Julia Omokhuale	—	—	–	–	18	18	–
Eden Kilgour	—	—	–	–	14	14	–
Taylor Perry	—	—	–	–	40	40	–

== China ==
Women's Head Coach: (China) Lu Zhuan

China women's team members 2024–25
Player	Jersey number by tournament						
Player	Dubai	Cape Town	Perth	Vancouver	Hong Kong	Singapore	Los Angeles
Zheng Wenyan	13	13	–	–	–	–	–
Sun Yue	16	16	–	–	–	–	–
Kang Chengtian	23	23	–	23	23	23	23
Wang Xuemin	36	–	–	–	–	–	–
Chen Ziying	29	29	29	29	29	29	29
Ge Chenjie	26	–	–	26	26	26	–
Hu Yu	12	–	12	–	12	12	12
Yan Meiling	2	2	2	–	2	2	2
Wang Zhaojing	30	30	30	35	35	–	–
Jiang Yutong	21	21	–	21	21	21	–
Gao Xiaoyang	77	77	77	–	–	–	–
Zhou Yan	20	20	20	20	20	20	20
Dou Xinrong	15	15	15	–	15	15	15
Liao Jiuli	–	10	10	10	–	10	10
Su Qi	–	18	–	–	–	–	18
Le Zhang	–	35	–	35	–	35	35
Gu Yaoyao	–	–	5	5	5	–	–
Chen Keyi	–	–	7	7	–	–	7
Liu Xiaoqian	–	–	11	–	–	–	–
Wang Wanyu	–	–	6	6	6	6	6
Chen Can	–	–	19	19	19	19	19
Liu Xueya	–	–	–	27	–	–	–
Ma Xiaodan	–	–	–	–	28	28	28

== Colombia ==
Women's Head Coach: (Colombia) Lissete Martínez

Colombia women's team members 2024–25
Player	Jersey number by tournament
Player	Los Angeles
Daniela Álzate	1
Carol Carmona	6
Madi Córdoba	9
Karen Jiménez	16
Camila Lopera	10
Angie Manyoma	2
Laura Mejía	12
Maribel Mestra	3
Valeria Muñoz	4
Zuleyma Orobio	5
Juliana Soto	11
Leidy Soto	14
Valentina Tapias	15

== Fiji ==
Men's Head Coach: (Fiji) Osea Kolinisau
Women's Head Coach: (Fiji) Timoci Volavola

Fiji men's team members 2024–25
Player	Jersey number by tournament						
Player	Dubai	Cape Town	Perth	Vancouver	Hong Kong	Singapore	Los Angeles
Pilipo Bukayaro	9	9	9	–	–	–	–
Kavekini Tanivanuakula	1	1	1	–	1	1	1
Joji Nasova	13	13	13	13	13	13	13
Iowane Teba	10	10	10	–	10	10	–
Sevuloni Mocenacagi	4	4	—	4	4	4	4
Ilikimi Vunaki	6	6	—	6	–	–	–
Jerry Matana	3	3	—	3	3	–	–
Terio Veilawa	88	88	88	88	–	–	88
Vuiviawa Naduvalo	12	12	12	12	12	12	–
George Bose	55	55	55	55	55	55	–
Suli Volivolituevi	89	89	89	–	–	–	–
Filipe Sauturaga	7	7	7	7	7	7	7
Tira Wilagi	5	5	5	5	–	5	5
Joseva Talacolo	—	—	2	2	2	2	–
Rubeni Kabu	—	—	70	–	–	–	–
Sakiusa Siqila	—	—	92	92	92	92	92
Mosese Raqona	—	—	–	51	–	–	–
Waisea Nacuqu	—	—	–	8	–	–	8
Isikeli Basiyalo	—	—	–	–	15	15	15
Manueli Maisamoa	—	—	–	–	11	11	11
Rauto Vakadranu	—	—	–	–	28	28	–
Iliavi Nasova	—	—	–	–	–	–	21
Aisea Nawai	—	—	–	–	–	–	45
Lesaro Bogisa	—	—	–	–	–	–	49

Fiji women's team members 2024–25
Player	Jersey number by tournament						
Player	Dubai	Cape Town	Perth	Vancouver	Hong Kong	Singapore	Los Angeles
Sera Bolatini	34	34	34	34	34	34	–
Adimo Naisoro	27	27	—	–	–	–	–
Ana Maria Naimasi	8	8	—	–	–	–	–
Varanisese Qoro	32	32	—	–	–	–	–
Vika Nakacia	37	37	37	37	37	37	37
Silika Qalo	35	35	35	35	35	35	35
Rogosau Adimereani	18	18	18	18	18	18	18
Ilisapeci Delaiwau	14	14	14	14	14	14	14
Lavena Cavuru	7	7	7	7	7	7	7
Mere Vocevoce	30	30	—	30	30	30	30
Milika Drugunavanua	31	31	—	–	–	–	–
Ruth Raketekete	33	33	—	33	–	–	–
Livea Naidei	29	29	—	29	–	–	–
Verenaisi Ditavutu	—	—	20	–	20	20	20
Sesenieli Donu	—	—	4	4	4	4	4
Mereula Torooti	—	—	23	23	23	23	23
Loata Nabulagi	—	—	42	–	–	–	–
Kelerayani Luvu	—	—	28	–	28	28	28
Adita Milinia	—	—	40	40	40	40	40
Reapi Ulunisau	—	—	–	6	–	–	–
Michell Seruvatu	—	—	–	–	39	39	39
Mariana Talatoka	—	—	–	–	–	–	41

== France ==
Men's Head Coach: (France) Benoît Baby
Women's Head Coach: (France) Romain Huet

France men's team members 2024–25
Player	Jersey number by tournament						
Player	Dubai	Cape Town	Perth	Vancouver	Hong Kong	Singapore	Los Angeles
Victor Hannoun	64	64	–	–	–	–	–
Grégoire Arfeuil	59	–	–	59	59	59	59
Liam Delamare	76	76	76	76	76	76	76
Varian Pasquet	19	19	–	–	–	19	19
Antoine Zeghdar	8	8	–	–	8	–	–
Paulin Riva	6	6	6	6	6	6	6
William Iraguha	91	91	91	91	–	91	–
Ali Dabo	75	75	–	75	–	–	–
Stephen Parez	5	5	5	5	–	–	5
Romain Gardrat	33	–	33	–	–	–	–
Enahemo Artaud	48	48	48	48	48	48	48
Celian Pouzelgues	31	31	31	31	–	31	–
Jordan Sepho	12	12	12	12	12	12	12
Simon Désert	–	11	11	11	11	11	11
Joe Quere Karaba	–	1	1	1	1	1	1
Mateo Garcia	—	—	53	–	53	53	53
Enzo Benmegal	—	—	78	78	–	–	78
Josselin Bouhier	—	—	28	–	–	28	–
Leo Monin	—	—	–	2	–	–	–
Nelson Épée	—	—	–	–	7	–	–
Andy Timo	—	—	–	–	88	88	88
Yerim Fall	—	—	–	–	24	–	24
Paul Leraitre	—	—	–	–	15	–	–

France women's team members 2024–25
Player	Jersey number by tournament						
Player	Dubai	Cape Town	Perth	Vancouver	Hong Kong	Singapore	Los Angeles
Cleo Hagel	26	–	–	26	26	26	26
Lili Dezou	28	28	28	28	28	28	28
Anne-Cécile Ciofani	2	2	2	2	–	–	–
Carla Neisen	9	9	9	9	9	9	9
Alycia Chrystiaens	22	22	22	22	22	22	22
Perrine Fagnen	56	56	–	–	–	–	–
Léa Trollier	20	20	–	20	20	20	20
Suliana Sivi	12	–	–	–	–	–	–
Hawa Tounkara	21	21	21	21	21	21	21
Iän Jason	88	88	88	–	–	–	–
Marie Dupouy	27	27	27	27	–	–	27
Valentine Lothoz	7	7	7	7	7	7	7
Kelly Arbey	87	87	87	–	–	–	–
Rose Marie Fiafialoto	–	98	98	–	98	98	–
Noa Coudre	–	73	–	73	–	73	73
Lou Noel	–	–	4	4	4	4	4
Hada Traoré	–	–	30	30	–	–	–
Camille Grassineau	–	–	8	–	–	–	8
Aelig Trégouet	—	—	–	47	–	–	–
Oceane Buisson	–	–	–	–	15	15	–
Romane Ménager	–	–	–	–	3	–	–
Charlie Gauyat	–	–	–	–	14	14	14
Flavie Laine	–	–	–	–	18	–	–
Faustine Piscicelli	—	—	–	–	–	49	–
Émeline Gros	—	—	–	–	–	–	19

== Germany ==
Men's Head Coach: (Spain) Pablo Feijoo

Germany men's team members 2024–25
Player	Jersey number by tournament
Player	Los Angeles
Makonnen Amekuedi	60
Jakob Dipper	99
Cedric Eichholz	54
Ben Ellermann	8
Daniel Eneke	30
Anton Gleitze	10
Philip Gleitze	11
Max Heid	5
Felix Hufnagel	1
Niklas Koch	4
Tim Lichtenberg	12
Chris Umeh	71

== Great Britain ==
Men's Head Coach: (England) Tony Roques
Women's Head Coach: (England) Giselle Mather

Great Britain men's team members 2024–25
Player	Jersey number by tournament						
Player	Dubai	Cape Town	Perth	Vancouver	Hong Kong	Singapore	Los Angeles
Tom Burton	15	15	–	–	–	–	–
Jamie Barden	3	–	–	–	–	–	–
Will Homer	9	9	9	9	9	9	9
Marcus Kershaw	5	5	5	5	5	5	5
Matt Davidson	6	6	6	6	6	6	6
Morgan Williams	7	7	7	7	7	7	7
Luke Mehson	18	18	18	18	18	18	18
Tom Williams	2	2	–	–	2	2	2
Ryan Apps	14	14	14	14	–	–	–
Sunni Jardine	44	44	44	44	44	44	44
Charlton Kerr	24	24	24	24	24	24	24
Ethan Waddleton	11	11	11	11	–	–	11
Harry Glover	12	12	12	12	12	12	12
Callum Carson	–	13	13	13	13	13	13
Toby Baldwin	–	–	77	77	–	–	–
Freddie Roddick	–	–	8	8	8	8	8
Tom Emery	–	–	–	–	10	10	10
James Pavey	–	–	–	–	22	22	–

Great Britain women's team members 2024–25
Player	Jersey number by tournament						
Player	Dubai	Cape Town	Perth	Vancouver	Hong Kong	Singapore	Los Angeles
Vicky Laflin	11	11	–	–	11	11	11
Abbie Brown	2	2	2	2	2	2	2
Eloise Hayward	77	77	–	–	–	–	–
Heather Cowell	23	23	23	23	–	–	23
Lauren Torley	6	6	6	6	6	6	6
Georgie Lingham	27	27	27	27	27	27	27
Grace Crompton	4	4	4	4	4	4	–
Emma Uren	6	7	–	–	7	7	7
Emma Mundy	25	25	–	–	–	–	–
Ellie Boatman	13	13	13	13	–	–	–
Jade Shekells	22	22	22	22	–	–	–
Katie Shillaker	8	8	8	–	–	–	8
Reneeqa Bonner	48	48	–	–	48	48	48
Alicia Maude	–	–	35	35	35	35	35
Charlotte Woodman	–	–	1	1	–	–	1
Catherine Richards	–	–	14	14	–	–	–
Isla Norman-Bell	–	–	9	9	9	9	–
Chantelle Miell	–	–	17	–	17	17	–
Shona Campbell	–	–	–	5	5	5	5
Amy Wilson-Hardy	–	–	–	–	12	12	12
Grace White	–	–	–	–	72	72	72

== Ireland ==
Men's Head Coach: (Ireland) James Topping
Women's Head Coach: (South Africa) Allan Temple-Jones

Ireland men's team members 2024–25
Player	Jersey number by tournament						
Player	Dubai	Cape Town	Perth	Vancouver	Hong Kong	Singapore	Los Angeles
Niall Comerford	12	12	12	12	12	12	12
Hugo Lennox	9	9	9	9	9	9	–
Rory Woods	3	3	–	–	–	–	–
Josh Costello	21	21	21	21	21	21	21
Mark Roche	4	4	4	4	4	4	4
James Dillon	22	22	22	22	–	–	–
Tadhg Brophy	50	50	50	50	–	–	50
Zac McConnell	1	–	–	–	1	1	1
Josh Kenny	33	33	33	33	33	33	33
Ed Kelly	14	14	14	–	14	14	14
Bryan Mollen	13	13	13	13	13	13	13
Nicholas Greene	51	51	51	–	51	51	51
Jordan Conroy	7	7	7	7	7	7	–
Harry McNulty	–	93	–	–	–	–	–
Inigo O'Brien	–	–	8	8	–	–	–
Dylan O'Grady	–	–	30	30	30	30	30
Conor Phillips	–	–	–	11	11	11	11
Daniel Hawkshaw	–	–	–	88	88	88	88
Aaron O'Sullivan	–	–	–	–	–	–	15

Ireland women's team members 2024–25
Player	Jersey number by tournament						
Player	Dubai	Cape Town	Perth	Vancouver	Hong Kong	Singapore	Los Angeles
Stacey Flood	3	3	–	–	–	–	–
Eve Higgins	10	10	–	–	–	–	–
Hannah Clarke	2	2	2	2	2	2	2
Kathy Baker	6	6	6	6	6	6	6
Beibhinn Parsons	7	7	–	–	–	–	–
Clare Gorman	15	15	15	15	15	15	15
Emily Lane	12	12	–	–	–	–	–
Anna McGann	19	19	–	–	–	–	–
Amee-Leigh Murphy Crowe	5	5	–	–	–	–	–
Robyn O'Connor	22	22	22	22	22	22	22
Vicky Elmes Kinlan	21	21	–	–	–	–	–
Megan Burns	8	8	8	8	8	8	8
Erin King	13	13	–	–	–	–	–
Kate Farrell McCabe	–	–	11	11	11	11	11
Alana McInerney	–	–	26	26	26	26	26
Ellen Boylan	–	–	4	4	4	–	–
Katie Whelan	–	–	71	71	71	71	71
Katie Corrigan	–	–	24	–	–	–	–
Alanna Fitzpatrick	–	–	17	17	17	17	17
Lucinda Kinghan	–	–	23	23	23	23	23
Lucia Linn	–	–	56	56	56	56	56
Ella Roberts	–	–	–	14	14	14	14
Amy Larn	–	–	–	–	–	–	18

== Japan ==
Women's Head Coach: (Japan) Yuka Kanematsu

Japan women's team members 2024–25
Player	Jersey number by tournament						
Player	Dubai	Cape Town	Perth	Vancouver	Hong Kong	Singapore	Los Angeles
Minako Taniyama	19	19	19	19	19	19	19
Seika Ohashi	18	18	18	18	–	–	18
Mayu Yoshino	13	13	13	13	–	–	13
Hana Nagata	12	12	12	12	12	12	12
Mei Ohtani	7	7	7	–	7	7	7
Marin Kajiki	4	4	4	4	4	4	–
Suzuha Okamoto	14	14	14	14	14	14	14
Chiaki Saegusa	2	2	2	2	2	2	–
Wakana Akita	16	16	16	–	–	–	16
Yumeno Sakoda	10	–	–	–	–	–	–
Hanako Utsumi	11	11	–	11	11	11	11
Natsumi Takahashi	17	17	–	17	–	–	–
Yukino Tsujisaki	1	1	1	1	1	1	1
Raichel Bativakalolo	–	9	–	–	–	–	–
Ria Anoku	–	–	20	20	20	20	20
Emii Tanaka	–	–	5	–	5	5	5
Honoka Tsutsumi	–	–	3	3	3	3	3
Himwari Matsuda	–	–	–	21	21	21	21
Mao Ishida	–	–	–	–	15	15	–

== Kenya ==
Men's Head Coach: (Kenya) Kevin Wambua
Women's Head Coach: (Kenya) Dennis Mwanja

Kenya men's team members 2024–25
Player	Jersey number by tournament						
Player	Dubai	Cape Town	Perth	Vancouver	Hong Kong	Singapore	Los Angeles
William Mwanji Indakanu	19	19	19	19	19	19	19
Kevin Wekesa	6	6	6	6	6	6	6
Samuel Asati	9	9	9	9	9	9	9
Nygel Pettersan Amaitsa	10	10	10	10	10	10	10
Denis Abukuse	13	13	13	13	13	13	13
Floyd Wabwire	25	25	25	25	25	25	25
George Ooro Angeyo	3	3	3	3	3	3	3
Festus Shiasi Safari	5	5	5	–	5	5	5
Patrick Odongo Okong'o	11	11	11	11	11	11	11
Brayan Ondego	37	37	–	–	–	–	–
Brian Mutua	33	33	–	–	–	–	–
Benson Adoyo	30	30	30	–	–	–	–
Chrisant Ojwang	12	–	–	–	–	–	–
Tony Omondi	–	7	7	7	7	7	7
Brian Tanga	–	–	21	21	21	21	21
Vincent Onyala	–	–	4	4	4	4	4
Jackson Siketi	–	–	–	15	–	–	–
Jone Kabu	–	–	–	27	27	27	27

Kenya women's team members 2024–25
Player	Jersey number by tournament
Player	Los Angeles
Diana Achieng'	12
Sharon Auma	11
Sheila Chajira	3
Christabel Lindo	2
Faith Livol	1
Moreen Muritu	6
Edith Nariaka	21
Sinaida Nyachio	7
Freshia Oduor	8
Grace Okulu	10
Judith Okumu	12
Phoebe Otieno	5
Stella Wafula	4

== New Zealand ==
Men's Head Coach: (Fiji) Tomasi Cama
Women's Head Coach: (New Zealand) Cory Sweeney

New Zealand men's team members 2024–25
Player	Jersey number by tournament						
Player	Dubai	Cape Town	Perth	Vancouver	Hong Kong	Singapore	Los Angeles
Joey Taumateine	55	55	–	–	–	–	–
Cody Vai	25	25	25	–	25	25	–
Ngarohi McGarvey-Black	24	24	24	24	24	24	24
Sofai Maka	81	81	81	81	81	81	81
Sione Molia	27	27	27	27	27	27	–
Tone Ng Shiu	3	3	3	3	3	3	3
Dylan Collier	5	5	5	5	5	5	5
Brady Rush	2	2	2	2	2	2	2
Jack Gray	17	17	–	–	–	–	17
Oli Mathis	4	4	4	4	4	–	–
Lewis Ormond	13	13	13	13	–	–	–
Andrew Knewstubb	8	–	8	8	8	8	–
Joe Webber	11	–	–	11	11	11	–
Fletcher Carpenter	–	10	–	–	–	–	–
Rob Rush	–	22	–	–	–	22	22
Regan Ware	–	–	64	64	64	64	64
Maloni Kunawave	–	–	92	–	–	–	–
Frank Vaenuku	–	–	75	75	75	75	75
Jayden Keelan	–	–	–	15	–	–	–
Amanaki Nicole	–	–	–	–	1	1	1
Akuila Rokolisoa	–	–	–	–	–	–	6
Kitiona Vai	–	–	–	–	–	–	7
Sam Howling	–	–	–	–	–	–	88

New Zealand women's team members 2024–25
Player	Jersey number by tournament						
Player	Dubai	Cape Town	Perth	Vancouver	Hong Kong	Singapore	Los Angeles
Manaia Nuku	1	1	1	1	1	–	–
Jorja Miller	2	2	2	2	2	2	2
Risi Pouri-Lane	7	7	7	7	7	7	7
Dhys Faleafaga	28	28	28	28	28	28	–
Kelsey Teneti	88	88	88	88	88	88	88
Justine McGregor	44	44	–	–	–	–	44
Mahina Paul	4	4	4	4	4	4	4
Theresa Setefano	10	10	10	10	10	10	–
Sarah Hirini	5	5	5	5	5	5	5
Katelyn Vaha'akolo	95	95	95	–	–	–	–
Alena Saili	12	–	12	12	12	12	–
Kelly Brazier	8	8	8	–	–	–	–
Jazmin Felix-Hotham	13	13	13	13	13	13	13
Olive Watherston	–	82	–	–	–	–	82
Michaela Brake	–	–	6	6	6	6	6
Stacey Waaka	–	–	–	3	3	3	3
Maia Davis	–	–	–	11	11	11	11
Jaymie Kolose	–	–	–	–	–	–	23
Danii Mafoe	–	–	–	–	–	–	17

== Portugal ==
Men's Head Coach: (Portugal) Frederico de Sousa

Portugal men's team members 2024–25
Player	Jersey number by tournament
Player	Los Angeles
Francisco Almeida	6
Vasco Camara	7
Fábio Conceiçāo	12
Frederico Couto	20
Maximilien Coutts	14
Martim Dias	15
Jose Paiva dos Santos	26
Manuel Fati	3
Vasco Leite	1
José Monteiro	4
Duarte Morais	11
Bernardo Valente	16
Manuel Vareiro	10

== South Africa ==
Men's Head Coach: (South Africa) Philip Snyman
Women's Head Coach: (South Africa) Cecil Afrika

South Africa men's team members 2024–25
Player	Jersey number by tournament						
Player	Dubai	Cape Town	Perth	Vancouver	Hong Kong	Singapore	Los Angeles
Quewin Nortje	14	14	14	14	14	–	14
Donavan Don	15	15	15	15	15	15	–
Ryan Oosthuizen	2	–	2	2	2	2	2
Dewald Human	10	10	10	–	10	10	–
Shaun Williams	9	9	–	–	–	–	–
Tristan Leyds	24	24	–	24	24	24	24
Siviwe Soyizwapi	11	11	11	11	11	11	11
Shilton van Wyk	12	12	12	12	12	12	12
David Brits	19	19	19	19	–	19	19
Zain Davids	4	4	4	–	4	4	4
Ricardo Duarttee	5	5	5	5	5	5	5
Christie Grobbelaar	1	–	–	–	–	–	–
Impi Visser	3	3	3	3	3	3	3
Zander Reynders	–	21	21	21	21	21	21
Mfundo Ndhlovu	–	13	–	–	–	–	13
Selvyn Davids	–	–	8	8	8	8	8
Ronald Brown	–	–	7	7	–	–	7
Sebastiaan Jobb	–	–	–	16	–	16	–
Gino Cupido	–	–	–	–	20	–	–

South Africa women's team members 2024–25
Player	Jersey number by tournament
Player	Los Angeles
Leigh Fortuin	1
Felicia Jacobs	6
Shiniqwa Lamprecht	16
Ayanda Malinga	23
Zandile Masuku	11
Rights Mkhari	29
Patience Mokone	3
Zintle Mpupha	4
Simamkele Namba	14
Nadine Roos	9
Mathrin Simmers	10
Maria Tshiremba	7
Alicia Willemse	27

== Spain ==
Men's Head Coach: (Spain) Francisco Hernández
Women's Head Coach: (Spain) María Ribera

Spain men's team members 2024–25
Player	Jersey number by tournament						
Player	Dubai	Cape Town	Perth	Vancouver	Hong Kong	Singapore	Los Angeles
Francisco Cosculluela	20	20	20	20	20	20	20
Enrique Bolinches	13	13	13	13	–	–	13
Manu Moreno	10	10	10	10	10	10	10
Pol Pla	7	7	7	7	7	7	7
Angel Bozal	3	3	3	3	3	3	3
Josep Serres	2	2	2	2	2	2	2
Alejandro Laforga	19	19	19	19	19	19	19
Tobias Sainz-Trapaga	1	1	1	–	1	1	1
Anton Legorburu	24	24	24	24	24	–	24
Jeremy Trevithick	6	6	6	6	6	6	6
Roberto Ponce	8	8	—	8	–	–	–
Eduardo Lopez	12	12	12	12	12	12	12
Noah Cánepa	15	15	—	–	–	–	–
Juan Ramos	—	—	4	4	4	4	4
Jaime Manteca	–	–	14	14	14	14	14
Jaime Mata	—	—	—	—	9	9	–
Asier Perez	–	–	—	—	–	23	–

Spain women's team members 2024–25
Player	Jersey number by tournament						
Player	Dubai	Cape Town	Perth	Vancouver	Hong Kong	Singapore	Los Angeles
Zahia Perez	28	28	—	–	–	–	–
Juana Stella	23	23	23	23	23	23	23
Iciar Pozo	4	4	—	–	4	4	4
Marta Fresno	1	1	1	1	1	1	1
Ceci Huarte	3	3	3	3	3	3	3
Carmen Miranda	11	11	11	11	11	11	11
Maria Garcia	6	6	—	6	6	6	6
Marta Cantabrana	14	14	14	14	14	14	14
Anne Fernández de Corres	10	10	—	–	–	–	10
Silvia Morales	22	22	22	22	22	22	22
Abril Camacho	13	13	13	13	13	13	–
Jimena Blanco-Hortiguera	15	15	—	–	–	–	–
Olivia Fresnada	8	8	8	8	–	–	–
Angela Diez	—	—	25	–	–	–	–
Goreti Barrutieta	—	—	20	20	–	–	–
Sara Marin	—	—	5	–	–	–	–
Beatriz Dominguez	—	—	2	–	–	–	–
Denisse Gortazar	—	—	17	17	17	17	17
Alba Lisandra Martinez	–	–	—	18	18	18	–
Maria del Mar Molina	—	—	–	19	19	19	19
Camino Sotomayor	–	–	—	–	21	21	–
Beatriz Dominguez Sanchez	–	–	—	–	–	–	2
Clàudia Peña	–	–	—	–	–	–	56

== United States ==
Men's Head Coach: (England) Simon Amor
Women's Head Coach: (United States) Emilie Bydwell

United States men's team members 2024–25
Player	Jersey number by tournament						
Player	Dubai	Cape Town	Perth	Vancouver	Hong Kong	Singapore	Los Angeles
Marcus Tupuola	27	27	27	27	27	27	27
Faitala Talapusi	10	10	10	10	10	–	–
Peter Sio	7	7	7	7	–	7	7
Darrell Williams	33	–	–	–	–	–	–
Lance Williams	8	8	8	8	–	–	–
Aaron Cummings	1	1	1	1	1	1	1
Darius Law	14	–	–	–	–	–	–
Pita Vi	25	25	–	25	25	25	–
Lucas Lacamp	12	12	12	12	12	12	12
Porter Goodrum	22	–	–	–	–	22	22
Michael Hand	15	15	–	–	–	–	–
Jack Wendling	13	13	13	13	13	13	13
David Still	6	6	6	–	6	–	–
Will Chevalier	–	5	5	5	5	5	–
Noah Brown	–	88	–	–	–	–	–
Adam Channel	–	4	4	4	4	–	4
Stephen Tomasin	–	–	9	9	9	–	9
Ben Broselle	–	–	2	2	2	2	2
Jacob Broselle	–	–	20	20	20	20	20
Ulu Niutupuivaha	–	–	–	–	16	16	16
Perry Baker	–	–	–	–	–	11	11
Ryan Santos	–	–	–	–	–	14	14

United States women's team members 2024–25
Player	Jersey number by tournament						
Player	Dubai	Cape Town	Perth	Vancouver	Hong Kong	Singapore	Los Angeles
Ariana Ramsey	1	1	1	1	1	1	1
Rachel Strasdas	15	15	15	15	15	15	–
Autumn Locicero	20	20	20	20	20	20	20
Alyssa Porter	32	32	32	32	32	32	–
Alena Olsen	6	6	6	6	6	6	6
Susan Adegoke	24	24	24	24	24	24	24
Sarah Levy	13	13	–	–	–	–	13
Kayla Canett	3	3	3	3	3	3	3
Jess Lu	16	16	16	16	–	–	16
Nia Toliver	33	33	33	–	33	33	33
Kaylen Thomas	19	19	–	–	–	–	–
Hann Humphreys	29	29	29	–	29	29	–
Saraiah Ibarra	28	28	28	28	28	28	28
Kristi Kirshe	–	–	12	12	12	12	12
Autumn Czaplicki	–	–	99	99	–	–	–
Tessa Hann	–	–	–	30	–	–	30
Alex Sedrick	–	–	–	8	8	8	–
Sammy Sullivan	–	–	–	–	22	22	22
Ashley Cowdrey	–	–	–	–	–	–	26

== Uruguay ==
Men's Head Coach: (Uruguay) Gabriel Puig

Uruguay men's team members 2024–25
Player	Jersey number by tournament						
Player	Dubai	Cape Town	Perth	Vancouver	Hong Kong	Singapore	Los Angeles
Guillermo Lijtenstein	9	9	–	9	9	9	9
Pedro Hoblog	45	45	45	45	–	–	45
Ignacio Alvarez Akiki	13	13	13	13	13	13	13
Diego Ardao	6	6	6	6	6	6	6
Juan Manuel Tafernaberry	4	4	4	4	4	4	4
Mateo Viñals	7	7	–	7	7	7	7
Ignacio Facciolo	80	80	80	–	–	–	–
Pedro Brum	25	25	25	25	–	–	–
Tomás Etcheverry	3	3	3	3	3	3	3
Dante Soto	77	77	77	–	77	77	77
Alfonso Vidal	2	2	2	–	2	2	2
Alfonso Chahnazaroff	22	22	22	22	–	–	–
Santiago Gini	21	–	–	–	–	–	–
Alfonso Silva	–	11	–	–	11	11	–
Valentin Vargas	–	–	17	17	17	17	17
Martin Castro	–	–	19	–	–	–	–
Ignacio Rodriguez	–	–	23	23	–	–	–
Mauricio Maly	–	–	–	79	79	79	–
Juan Gonzalez	–	–	–	1	1	1	1
Joaquin Suarez	–	–	–	–	71	71	71
Bautista Basso	–	–	–	–	–	–	5
