= Timoci =

Timoci is a Fijian masculine given name. Notable people with the name include:

- Timoci Bavadra (1934–1989), Fijian medical doctor and former Prime Minister of Fiji
- Timoci Matanavou (born 1984), Fijian rugby union player
- Timoci Nagusa (born 1987), Fijian rugby union player
- Timoci Naivaluwaqa (1953–2006), Fijian politician
- Timoci Natuva (born 1957), Fijian politician
- Timoci Sauvoli (born 1991), Fijian rugby union player
- Timoci Silatolu, Fijian politician
- Timoci Tavatavanawai (born 1998), Fijian rugby union player
- Timoci Tuivaga (1931–2015), Fijian judge
- Timoci Volavola, Fijian rugby union player
