= Volavola =

Volavola is a surname. Notable people with the surname include:

- Ben Volavola (born 1991), Australian-born Fijian rugby union player
- Mosese Volavola (born 1979), Fijian rugby union player
- Peni Volavola, Fijian politician
- Timoci Volavola, Fijian rugby union player
