= 2025 Canada Sevens =

World Rugby Sevens Series tournaments

- 2024–25 SVNS
- Host nation: Canada

Men
- Date: 21–23 February
- Champion: Argentina
- Runner-up: South Africa
- Third: Spain

Women
- Date: 21–23 February
- Champion: New Zealand
- Runner-up: Fiji
- Third: Australia

Tournament details
- Matches played: 64

The 2025 Canada Sevens or SVNS VAN was a rugby sevens tournament played at BC Place. Twelve men's teams and a similar number of women's teams participated. In addition to the SVNS tournament, there was also an invitational pool for 3 men's teams.

== Men's tournament ==
=== Pool stage ===
Points system: Teams were awarded 3 points for a win, 2 points for a draw and 0 points for a loss. For a loss of 7 points or fewer teams were awarded 1 bonus point.

Key to colours in pool tables
| Teams that advanced to the Cup quarterfinals |
| Teams that advanced to the 9th place semifinals |

=== Pool A ===
| Pos | Team | Pld | W | L | PF | PA | PD | BP | Pts |
|---|---|---|---|---|---|---|---|---|---|
| 1 | Argentina | 3 | 3 | 0 | 55 | 19 | +36 | 0 | 9 |
| 2 | Great Britain | 3 | 2 | 1 | 68 | 36 | +32 | 1 | 7 |
| 3 | France | 3 | 1 | 2 | 45 | 45 | 0 | 1 | 4 |
| 4 | Kenya | 3 | 0 | 3 | 17 | 85 | –68 | 0 | 0 |

21 February

| France | 7–26 | Great Britain |

BC Place, Vancouver

21 February

| Argentina | 24–0 | Kenya |

BC Place, Vancouver

21 February

| France | 33–7 | Kenya |

BC Place, Vancouver

21 February

| Argentina | 19–14 | Great Britain |

BC Place, Vancouver

22 February

| Great Britain | 28–10 | Kenya |

BC Place, Vancouver

22 February

| Argentina | 12–5 | France |

BC Place, Vancouver

=== Pool B ===
| Pos | Team | Pld | W | L | PF | PA | PD | BP | Pts |
|---|---|---|---|---|---|---|---|---|---|
| 1 | South Africa | 3 | 2 | 1 | 52 | 34 | +18 | 1 | 7 |
| 2 | New Zealand | 3 | 2 | 1 | 58 | 40 | +18 | 1 | 7 |
| 3 | Australia | 3 | 2 | 1 | 41 | 38 | +5 | 0 | 6 |
| 4 | Ireland | 3 | 0 | 3 | 35 | 76 | –41 | 0 | 0 |

21 February

| South Africa | 12–10 | New Zealand |

BC Place, Vancouver

21 February

| Australia | 17–7 | Ireland |

BC Place, Vancouver

21 February

| South Africa | 28–7 | Ireland |

BC Place, Vancouver

21 February

| Australia | 7–17 | New Zealand |

BC Place, Vancouver

22 February

| New Zealand | 31–21 | Ireland |

BC Place, Vancouver

22 February

| Australia | 17–14 | South Africa |

BC Place, Vancouver

=== Pool C ===
| Pos | Team | Pld | W | L | PF | PA | PD | BP | Pts |
|---|---|---|---|---|---|---|---|---|---|
| 1 | Fiji | 3 | 3 | 0 | 97 | 45 | +52 | 0 | 9 |
| 2 | Spain | 3 | 2 | 1 | 73 | 50 | +23 | 1 | 7 |
| 3 | Uruguay | 3 | 1 | 2 | 34 | 83 | –49 | 0 | 3 |
| 4 | United States | 3 | 0 | 3 | 31 | 57 | –26 | 2 | 2 |

21 February

| Fiji | 38–12 | Uruguay |

BC Place, Vancouver

21 February

| Spain | 14–12 | United States |

BC Place, Vancouver

21 February

| Fiji | 33–12 | United States |

BC Place, Vancouver

21 February

| Spain | 38–12 | Uruguay |

BC Place, Vancouver

22 February

| Uruguay | 10–7 | United States |

BC Place, Vancouver

22 February

| Spain | 21–26 | Fiji |

BC Place, Vancouver

=== Invitational Tournament ===
21 February

| Canada | 55–12 | Trinidad and Tobago |

BC Place, Vancouver

21 February

| Canada | 33–12 | Japan |

BC Place, Vancouver

21 February

| Japan | 26–19 | Trinidad and Tobago |

BC Place, Vancouver

22 February

| Canada | 50–0 | Trinidad and Tobago |

BC Place, Vancouver

22 February

| Canada | 51–12 | Japan |

BC Place, Vancouver

22 February

| Japan | 31–15 | Trinidad and Tobago |

BC Place, Vancouver

=== 9th to 12th playoffs ===
9th place semifinals
22 February 2025 – BC Place
United States | 21
Ireland | 0
22 February 2025 – BC Place
Uruguay | 19
Kenya | 14

9th place final
23 February 2025 – BC Place
United States | 22
Uruguay | 21
11th place final
23 February 2025 – BC Place
Ireland | 19
Kenya | 14

=== 5th to 8th playoffs ===
Fifth Place

23 February

| Great Britain | 31–10 | New Zealand |

BC Place, Vancouver

Seventh Place

23 February

| Australia | 15–12 | France |

BC Place, Vancouver

=== Cup ===
Quarterfinals
22 February 2025 – BC Place
New Zealand | 7
Spain | 12
22 February 2025 – BC Place
Argentina | 12
France | 7
22 February 2025 – BC Place
Fiji | 24
Great Britain | 0
22 February 2025 – BC Place
South Africa | 17
Australia | 14

Semifinals
23 February 2025 – BC Place
Spain | 0
Argentina | 7
23 February 2025 – BC Place
Fiji | 10
South Africa | 12

Final
23 February 2025 – BC Place
Argentina | 19
South Africa | 12
Bronze final
23 February 2025 – BC Place
Spain | 22
Fiji | 7

=== Final placings ===
| Place | Team |
|---|---|
| 1st place, gold medalist(s) | Argentina |
| 2nd place, silver medalist(s) | South Africa |
| 3rd place, bronze medalist(s) | Spain |
| 4 | Fiji |
| 5 | Great Britain |
| 6 | New Zealand |
| 7 | Australia |
| 8 | France |
| 9 | United States |
| 10 | Uruguay |
| 11 | Ireland |
| 12 | Kenya |

== Women's tournament ==
=== Pool stage ===
Points system: Teams were awarded 3 points for a win, 2 points for a draw and 0 points for a loss. For a loss of 7 points or fewer teams were awarded 1 bonus point.

Key to colours in pool tables
| Teams that advanced to the Cup semifinals |
| Teams that advanced to the 9th place semifinals |

=== Pool A ===
| Pos | Team | Pld | W | L | PF | PA | PD | BP | Pts |
|---|---|---|---|---|---|---|---|---|---|
| 1 | Brazil | 3 | 2 | 1 | 52 | 55 | –3 | 1 | 7 |
| 2 | Australia | 3 | 2 | 1 | 89 | 28 | +61 | 1 | 7 |
| 3 | Canada | 3 | 2 | 1 | 81 | 59 | +22 | 0 | 6 |
| 4 | Spain | 3 | 0 | 3 | 22 | 102 | –80 | 1 | 1 |

21 February

| Canada | 26–19 | Brazil |

BC Place, Vancouver

21 February

| Australia | 42–0 | Spain |

BC Place, Vancouver

21 February

| Canada | 41–5 | Spain |

BC Place, Vancouver

21 February

| Australia | 12–14 | Brazil |

BC Place, Vancouver

22 February

| Brazil | 19–17 | Spain |

BC Place, Vancouver

22 February

| Australia | 35–14 | Canada |

BC Place, Vancouver

=== Pool B ===
| Pos | Team | Pld | W | L | PF | PA | PD | BP | Pts |
|---|---|---|---|---|---|---|---|---|---|
| 1 | New Zealand | 3 | 3 | 0 | 133 | 14 | +119 | 0 | 9 |
| 2 | United States | 3 | 2 | 1 | 52 | 64 | –12 | 0 | 6 |
| 3 | China | 3 | 1 | 2 | 46 | 59 | –13 | 0 | 3 |
| 4 | Ireland | 3 | 0 | 3 | 24 | 118 | –94 | 0 | 0 |

21 February

| United States | 21–10 | China |

BC Place, Vancouver

21 February

| New Zealand | 58–7 | Ireland |

BC Place, Vancouver

21 February

| United States | 31–17 | Ireland |

BC Place, Vancouver

21 February

| New Zealand | 38–7 | China |

BC Place, Vancouver

22 February

| China | 29–0 | Ireland |

BC Place, Vancouver

22 February

| New Zealand | 37–0 | United States |

BC Place, Vancouver

=== Pool C ===
| Pos | Team | Pld | W | L | PF | PA | PD | BP | Pts |
|---|---|---|---|---|---|---|---|---|---|
| 1 | Great Britain | 3 | 2 | 1 | 55 | 50 | +5 | 1 | 7 |
| 2 | Japan | 3 | 2 | 1 | 50 | 59 | –9 | 0 | 6 |
| 3 | Fiji | 3 | 1 | 2 | 59 | 55 | +4 | 2 | 5 |
| 4 | France | 3 | 1 | 2 | 53 | 53 | 0 | 1 | 4 |

21 February

| Japan | 19–14 | Fiji |

BC Place, Vancouver

21 February

| France | 10–17 | Great Britain |

BC Place, Vancouver

21 February

| Japan | 19–14 | Great Britain |

BC Place, Vancouver

21 February

| France | 12–24 | Fiji |

BC Place, Vancouver

22 February

| Fiji | 21–24 | Great Britain |

BC Place, Vancouver

22 February

| France | 31–12 | Japan |

BC Place, Vancouver

=== 9th to 12th playoffs ===
9th place semifinals
22 February 2025 – BC Place
France | 19
Spain | 12
22 February 2025 – BC Place
China | 15
Ireland | 7

9th place final
23 February 2025 – >BC Place
France | 26
China | 12
11th place final
23 February 2025 – BC Place
Spain | 28
Ireland | 5

=== 5th to 8th playoffs ===
Fifth Place

23 February

| Great Britain | 10–19 | Brazil |

BC Place, Vancouver

Seventh Place

23 February

| Canada | 27–10 | United States |

BC Place, Vancouver

=== Cup ===
Quarterfinals
22 February 2025 – BC Place
United States | 17
Japan | 22
22 February 2025 – BC Place
Brazil | 0
Fiji | 46
22 February 2025 – BC Place
Great Britain | 14
Australia | 28
22 February 2025 – BC Place
New Zealand | 34
Canada | 12

Semifinals
23 February 2025 – BC Place
Japan | 7
Fiji | 28
23 February 2025 – BC Place
Australia | 10
New Zealand | 29

Final
23 February 2025 – BC Place
New Zealand | 41
Fiji | 7
Bronze final
23 February 2025 – BC Place
Australia | 26
Japan | 12

=== Final placings ===
| Place | Team |
|---|---|
| 1st place, gold medalist(s) | New Zealand |
| 2nd place, silver medalist(s) | Fiji |
| 3rd place, bronze medalist(s) | Australia |
| 4 | Japan |
| 5 | Brazil |
| 6 | Great Britain |
| 7 | Canada |
| 8 | United States |
| 9 | France |
| 10 | China |
| 11 | Spain |
| 12 | Ireland |

2024–25 SVNS
| Preceded by 2025 Australia Sevens | 2025 Canada Sevens | Succeeded by 2025 Hong Kong Sevens |
