= 2025 Singapore Sevens =

World Rugby Sevens Series tournaments

2025 Singapore SVNS
- 2024–25 SVNS
- Host nation: Singapore

Men
- Date: 5–6 April 2025
- Champion: Fiji
- Runner-up: Kenya
- Third: Argentina

Women
- Date: 5–6 April 2025
- Champion: New Zealand
- Runner-up: Australia
- Third: Canada

Tournament details
- Matches played: 48

The 2025 Singapore Sevens or SVNS SGP was a rugby sevens tournament played at Singapore National Stadium. Twelve men's and women's teams participated.

The format of the tournament differs to the other tournaments on the series, with four groups of three teams and no quarter-finals matches. This is because the men's and women's tournaments are held over two days at a single venue.

== Men's tournament ==
=== Pool stage ===
Points system: Teams were awarded 3 points for a win, 2 points for a draw and 0 points for a loss. For a loss of 7 points or fewer teams were awarded 1 bonus point.

Key to colours in pool tables
Teams that advanced to the cup quarterfinals
Teams that advanced to the 5th place semifinals
Teams that advanced to the 9th place semifinals

=== Pool A ===
Pos	Team	Pld	W	L	PF	PA	PD	BP	Pts
1	Argentina	2	1	1	43	38	+5	1	4
2	Great Britain	2	1	1	50	29	+21	1	4
3	South Africa	2	1	1	36	62	–26	0	3

5 April

Great Britain	38–10	South Africa

National Stadium, Singapore

5 April

South Africa	26–24	Argentina

National Stadium, Singapore

5 April

Argentina	19–12	Great Britain

National Stadium, Singapore

=== Pool B ===
Pos	Team	Pld	W	L	PF	PA	PD	BP	Pts
1	Kenya	2	2	0	27	14	+13	0	6
2	Ireland	2	1	1	33	36	–3	0	3
3	France	2	0	2	26	36	–10	2	2

5 April

Ireland	7–17	Kenya

National Stadium, Singapore

5 April

France	7–10	Kenya

National Stadium, Singapore

5 April

France	19–26	Ireland

National Stadium, Singapore

=== Pool C ===
Pos	Team	Pld	W	L	PF	PA	PD	BP	Pts
1	Spain	2	2	0	49	19	+30	0	6
2	Uruguay	2	1	1	40	26	+14	0	3
3	Australia	2	0	2	12	56	–44	0	0

5 April

Spain	21–12	Uruguay

National Stadium, Singapore

5 April

Australia	5–28	Uruguay

National Stadium, Singapore

5 April

Australia	7–28	Spain

National Stadium, Singapore

=== Pool D ===
Pos	Team	Pld	W	L	PF	PA	PD	BP	Pts
1	Fiji	2	2	0	74	5	+69	0	6
2	New Zealand	2	1	1	34	50	–16	0	3
3	United States	2	0	2	14	67	–53	0	0

5 April

New Zealand	29–14	United States

National Stadium, Singapore

5 April

Fiji	38–0	United States

National Stadium, Singapore

5 April

Fiji	36–5	New Zealand

National Stadium, Singapore

=== 9th to 12th playoffs ===
9th place semifinals
6 April – National Stadium
France	5
Australia	28
6 April – National Stadium
South Africa	14
United States	12

9th place final
6 April – National Stadium
South Africa	26
Australia	7
11th place final
6 April – National Stadium
France	12
United States	17

=== 5th to 8th playoffs ===
5th place semifinals
6 April – National Stadium
Ireland	5
Uruguay	27
6 April – National Stadium
Great Britain	24
New Zealand	22

5th place final
6 April – National Stadium
Uruguay	29
Great Britain	33
7th place final
6 April – National Stadium
Ireland	21
New Zealand	19

=== Cup ===
Semifinals
6 April – National Stadium
Kenya	12
Spain	5
6 April – National Stadium
Argentina	24
Fiji	33

Final
6 April – National Stadium
Kenya	12
Fiji	21
Bronze final
6 April – National Stadium
Spain	14
Argentina	33

=== Final placings ===
Place	Team
1st place, gold medalist(s)	Fiji
2nd place, silver medalist(s)	Kenya
3rd place, bronze medalist(s)	Argentina
4	Spain
5	Great Britain
6	Uruguay
7	Ireland
8	New Zealand
9	South Africa
10	Australia
11	United States
12	France

== Women's tournament ==
=== Pool stage ===
Points system: Teams were awarded 3 points for a win, 2 points for a draw and 0 points for a loss. For a loss of 7 points or fewer teams were awarded 1 bonus point.

Key to colours in pool tables
Teams that advanced to the cup quarterfinals
Teams that advanced to the 5th place semifinals
Teams that advanced to the 9th place semifinals

=== Pool A ===
Pos	Team	Pld	W	L	PF	PA	PD	BP	Pts
1	New Zealand	2	2	0	86	0	+86	0	6
2	China	2	1	1	19	43	–24	0	3
3	Brazil	2	0	2	5	67	–62	0	0

5 April

Brazil	5–19	China

National Stadium, Singapore

5 April

New Zealand	38–0	China

National Stadium, Singapore

5 April

New Zealand	48–0	Brazil

National Stadium, Singapore

=== Pool B ===
Pos	Team	Pld	W	L	PF	PA	PD	BP	Pts
1	Australia	2	2	0	74	5	+69	0	6
2	Japan	2	1	1	29	55	–26	0	3
3	Spain	2	0	2	12	55	–43	0	0

5 April

Japan	24–12	Spain

National Stadium, Singapore

5 April

Australia	31–0	Spain

National Stadium, Singapore

5 April

Australia	43–5	Japan

National Stadium, Singapore

=== Pool C ===
Pos	Team	Pld	W	L	PF	PA	PD	BP	Pts
1	Canada	2	2	0	45	26	+19	0	6
2	Great Britain	2	1	1	20	26	–6	0	3
3	United States	2	0	2	33	46	–13	1	1

5 April

United States	12–15	Great Britain

National Stadium, Singapore

5 April

Canada	14–5	Great Britain

National Stadium, Singapore

5 April

Canada	31–21	United States

National Stadium, Singapore

=== Pool D ===
Pos	Team	Pld	W	L	PF	PA	PD	BP	Pts
1	France	2	2	0	41	19	+22	0	6
2	Fiji	2	1	1	45	36	+9	1	4
3	Ireland	2	0	2	12	43	–31	0	0

5 April

Fiji	26–12	Ireland

National Stadium, Singapore

5 April

France	17–0	Ireland

National Stadium, Singapore

5 April

France	24–19	Fiji

National Stadium, Singapore

=== 9th to 12th playoffs ===
9th place semifinals
6 April – National Stadium
Spain	15
United States	5
6 April – National Stadium
Brazil	10
Ireland	26

9th place final
6 April – National Stadium
Spain	17
Ireland	5
11th place final
6 April – National Stadium
United States	26
Brazil	21

=== 5th to 8th playoffs ===
5th place semifinals
6 April – National Stadium
Japan	21
Great Britain	12
6 April – National Stadium
China	27
Fiji	0

5th place final
6 April – National Stadium
Japan	26
China	12
7th place final
6 April – National Stadium
Great Britain	14
Fiji	43

=== Cup ===
Semifinals
6 April – National Stadium
Australia	45
Canada	7
6 April – National Stadium
New Zealand	40
France	14

Final
6 April – National Stadium
Australia	7
New Zealand	31
Bronze final
6 April – National Stadium
Canada	21
France	5

=== Final placings ===
By winning both of their pool matches New Zealand gained sufficient points to ensure that they retained the league series title.

Place	Team
1st place, gold medalist(s)	New Zealand
2nd place, silver medalist(s)	Australia
3rd place, bronze medalist(s)	Canada
4	France
5	Japan
6	China
7	Fiji
8	Great Britain
9	Spain
10	Ireland
11	United States
12	Brazil

2024–25 SVNS
Preceded by 2025 Hong Kong Sevens	2025 Singapore Sevens	Succeeded by 2025 USA Sevens
