= 2024 South Africa Sevens =

World Rugby Sevens Series tournaments

2024 Cape Town SVNS
- 2024–25 SVNS
- Host nation: South Africa

Men
- Date: 7–8 December 2024
- Champion: South Africa
- Runner-up: France
- Third: Fiji

Women
- Date: 7–8 December 2024
- Champion: New Zealand
- Runner-up: United States
- Third: France

Tournament details
- Matches played: 48

The 2024 South Africa Sevens or SVNS CPT was a rugby sevens tournament played at Cape Town Stadium. Twelve men's and women's teams participated.

The format of the tournament differs to the other tournaments on the series, with four groups of three teams and no quarter-finals matches. This is because the men's and women's tournaments are held over two days at a single venue.

== Men's tournament ==
=== Pool stage ===
Points system: Teams were awarded 3 points for a win, 2 points for a draw and 0 points for a loss. For a loss of 7 points or fewer teams were awarded 1 bonus point.

Key to colours in pool tables
Teams that advanced to the cup quarterfinals
Teams that advanced to the 5th place semifinals
Teams that advanced to the 9th place semifinals

=== Pool A ===
Pos	Team	Pld	W	L	PF	PA	PD	BP	Pts
1	Fiji	2	2	0	87	19	+68	0	6
2	Great Britain	2	1	1	45	32	+13	1	4
3	Uruguay	2	0	2	22	103	–81	0	0

7 December
11:22

Great Britain	33–15	Uruguay

DHL Stadium, Cape Town

7 December
14:38

Fiji	70–7	Uruguay

DHL Stadium, Cape Town

7 December
18:19

Fiji	17–12	Great Britain

DHL Stadium, Cape Town

=== Pool B ===
Pos	Team	Pld	W	L	PF	PA	PD	BP	Pts
1	Spain	2	2	0	33	21	+12	0	6
2	Kenya	2	1	1	26	26	0	1	4
3	Australia	2	0	2	26	38	–12	2	2

7 December
11:00

Australia	12–19	Kenya

DHL Stadium, Cape Town

7 December
14:16

Spain	14–7	Kenya

DHL Stadium, Cape Town

7 December
17:57

Spain	19–14	Australia

DHL Stadium, Cape Town

=== Pool C ===
Pos	Team	Pld	W	L	PF	PA	PD	BP	Pts
1	South Africa	2	2	0	65	12	+53	0	6
2	Argentina	2	1	1	34	36	–2	0	3
3	Ireland	2	0	2	14	65	–51	0	0

7 December
11:44

South Africa	36–7	Ireland

DHL Stadium, Cape Town

7 December
15:00

Argentina	29–7	Ireland

DHL Stadium, Cape Town

7 December
18:41

Argentina	5–29	South Africa

DHL Stadium, Cape Town

=== Pool D ===
Pos	Team	Pld	W	L	PF	PA	PD	BP	Pts
1	France	2	2	0	97	27	+70	0	6
2	New Zealand	2	1	1	34	64	–30	0	3
3	United States	2	0	2	29	69	–40	1	1

7 December
10:38

France	50–12	United States

DHL Stadium, Cape Town

7 December
13:54

New Zealand	19–17	United States

DHL Stadium, Cape Town

7 December
17:35

New Zealand	15–47	France

DHL Stadium, Cape Town

=== 9th to 12th playoffs ===
9th place semifinals
8 December – 10:38 – DHL Stadium
Australia	12
Ireland	7
8 December – 11:00 – DHL Stadium
Uruguay	14
United States	26

9th place final
8 December – 15:02 – DHL Stadium
Australia	19
United States	12
11th place final
8 December – 14:40 – DHL Stadium
Ireland	7
Uruguay	12

=== 5th to 8th playoffs ===
5th place semifinals
8 December – 11:22 – DHL Stadium
Kenya	14
Argentina	26
8 December – 11:44 – DHL Stadium
Great Britain	17
New Zealand	21

5th place final
8 December – 16:50 – DHL Stadium
Argentina	17
New Zealand	12
7th place final
8 December – 16:28 – DHL Stadium
Kenya	32
Great Britain	17

=== Cup ===
Semifinals
8 December – 13:56 – DHL Stadium
Spain	12
South Africa	19
8 December – 14:18 – DHL Stadium
Fiji	17
France	19

Final
8 December – 19:11 – DHL Stadium
South Africa	26
France	14
Bronze final
8 December – 18:03 – DHL Stadium
Spain	10
Fiji	47

=== Final placings ===
Place	Team
1st place, gold medalist(s)	South Africa
2nd place, silver medalist(s)	France
3rd place, bronze medalist(s)	Fiji
4	Spain
5	Argentina
6	New Zealand
7	Kenya
8	Great Britain
9	Australia
10	United States
11	Uruguay
12	Ireland

== Women's tournament ==
=== Pool stage ===
Points system: Teams were awarded 3 points for a win, 2 points for a draw and 0 points for a loss. For a loss of 7 points or fewer teams were awarded 1 bonus point.

Key to colours in pool tables
Teams that advanced to the cup quarterfinals
Teams that advanced to the 5th place semifinals
Teams that advanced to the 9th place semifinals

=== Pool A ===
Pos	Team	Pld	W	L	PF	PA	PD	BP	Pts
1	Australia	2	2	0	71	15	+56	0	6
2	Canada	2	1	1	53	43	+10	0	3
3	Brazil	2	0	2	22	88	–66	0	0

7 December
10:06

Canada	43–17	Brazil

DHL Stadium, Cape Town

7 December
13:22

Australia	45–5	Brazil

DHL Stadium, Cape Town

7 December
16:48

Australia	26–10	Canada

DHL Stadium, Cape Town

=== Pool B ===
Pos	Team	Pld	W	L	PF	PA	PD	BP	Pts
1	New Zealand	2	2	0	62	22	+40	0	6
2	Japan	2	1	1	26	29	–3	0	3
3	China	2	0	2	17	54	–37	1	1

7 December
09:44

Japan	14–7	China

DHL Stadium, Cape Town

7 December
13:00

New Zealand	40–10	China

DHL Stadium, Cape Town

7 December
16:26

New Zealand	22–12	Japan

DHL Stadium, Cape Town

=== Pool C ===
Pos	Team	Pld	W	L	PF	PA	PD	BP	Pts
1	France	2	2	0	36	0	+36	0	6
2	Ireland	2	1	1	34	20	+14	0	3
3	Spain	2	0	2	5	55	–50	0	0

7 December
09:22

Ireland	34–5	Spain

DHL Stadium, Cape Town

7 December
12:38

France	21–0	Spain

DHL Stadium, Cape Town

7 December
16:04

France	15–0	Ireland

DHL Stadium, Cape Town

=== Pool D ===
Pos	Team	Pld	W	L	PF	PA	PD	BP	Pts
1	United States	2	2	0	62	14	+48	0	6
2	Great Britain	2	1	1	36	36	0	0	3
3	Fiji	2	0	2	5	53	–48	0	0

7 December
09:00

United States	31–0	Fiji

DHL Stadium, Cape Town

7 December
14:16

Great Britain	22–5	Fiji

DHL Stadium, Cape Town

7 December
15:42

Great Britain	14–31	United States

DHL Stadium, Cape Town

=== 9th to 12th playoffs ===
9th place semifinals
8 December – 09:00 – DHL Stadium
China	19
Spain	7
8 December – 09:22 – DHL Stadium
Brazil	19
Fiji	22

9th place final
8 December – 12:50 – DHL Stadium
China	14
Fiji	12
11th place final
8 December – 12:28 – DHL Stadium
Spain	14
Brazil	26

=== 5th to 8th playoffs ===
5th place semifinals
8 December – 09:44 – DHL Stadium
Japan	26
Ireland	22
8 December – 10:06 – DHL Stadium
Canada	27
Great Britain	12

5th place final
8 December – 16:06 – DHL Stadium
Japan	7
Canada	22
7th place final
8 December – 15:44 – DHL Stadium
Ireland	7
Great Britain	24

=== Cup ===
Semifinals
8 December – 13:12 – DHL Stadium
New Zealand	43
France	0
8 December – 13:34 – DHL Stadium
Australia	19
United States	24

Final
8 December – 18:35 – DHL Stadium
New Zealand	26
United States	12
Bronze final
8 December – 17:35 – DHL Stadium
France	17
Australia	14

=== Final placings ===
Place	Team
1st place, gold medalist(s)	New Zealand
2nd place, silver medalist(s)	United States
3rd place, bronze medalist(s)	France
4	Australia
5	Canada
6	Japan
7	Great Britain
8	Ireland
9	China
10	Fiji
11	Brazil
12	Spain

2024–25 SVNS
Preceded by 2024 Dubai Sevens	2024 South Africa Sevens	Succeeded by 2025 Australia Sevens
