= 2025 USA Sevens =

World Rugby Sevens Series tournaments

- 2024–25 SVNS
- Host nation: United States

Men
- Date: 3–4 May 2025
- Champion: South Africa
- Runner-up: Spain
- Third: New Zealand

Women
- Date: 31 May–2 June 2025
- Champion: New Zealand
- Runner-up: Australia
- Third: Canada

Tournament details
- Matches played: 72

2025 SVNS Grand Final

The 2024 USA Sevens or SVNS LAX is a rugby sevens tournament played at Dignity Health Sports Park in Los Angeles. Sixteen men's and women's teams participated, of which eight teams participated in the SVNS World Championship and the other teams participated in the SVNS Playoff for core team status and to participate on the 2026 HSBC SVNS.

== Teams ==
The top eight-placed teams from the first seven previous events in the 2024–25 SVNS series played in a Grand Final event. The teams placed between nine–twelve competed in a promotion/relegation-style event with the top four teams from the men's and women's Challenger Series to decide which teams stay as core teams. Seeding of teams is in brackets. Teams were split into pools based on their seeding during the regular season and Challenger Series.

=== Men ===
World Championship	Playoff
Argentina (1)	Kenya (9)
Fiji (2)	Uruguay (10)
Spain (3)	Ireland (11)
South Africa (4)	United States (12)
France (5)	Portugal (CS1)
Australia (6)	Germany (CS2)
New Zealand (7)	Canada (CS3)
Great Britain (8)	Samoa (CS4)

=== Women ===
World Championship	Playoff
New Zealand (1)	Brazil (9)
Australia (2)	China (10)
France (3)	Ireland (11)
Canada (4)	Spain (12)
Japan (5)	Kenya (CS1)
United States (6)	South Africa (CS2)
Fiji (7)	Argentina (CS3)
Great Britain (8)	Colombia (CS4)

== Grand Finals - Men ==
=== Pool stage ===
Points system: Teams were awarded 3 points for a win, 2 points for a draw and 0 points for a loss. For a loss of 7 points or fewer teams were awarded 1 bonus point.

Key to colours in grand finals pool tables
Teams that advanced to the Championship semifinals
Teams that advanced to the 5th place semifinals

=== Pool A ===
Pos	Team	Pld	W	L	PF	PA	PD	BP	Pts
1	South Africa	3	3	0	60	38	+22	0	9
2	Argentina	3	2	1	71	67	+4	0	6
3	France	3	1	2	46	46	0	1	4
4	Great Britain	3	0	3	43	69	–26	2	2

3 May
12:12

South Africa	19–10	France

Dignity Health Sports Park, Los Angeles

3 May
12:34

Argentina	33–26	Great Britain

Dignity Health Sports Park, Los Angeles

3 May
15:13

South Africa	12-7	Great Britain

Dignity Health Sports Park, Los Angeles

3 May
15:35

Argentina	17-12	France

Dignity Health Sports Park, Los Angeles

3 May
18:24

France	24-10	Great Britain

Dignity Health Sports Park, Los Angeles

3 May
18:46

Argentina	21-29	South Africa

Dignity Health Sports Park, Los Angeles

=== Pool B ===
Pos	Team	Pld	W	L	PF	PA	PD	BP	Pts
1	Spain	3	2	1	41	32	+9	1	7
2	New Zealand	3	2	1	43	38	+5	1	7
3	Australia	3	2	1	49	45	+4	1	7
4	Fiji	3	0	3	38	56	–18	2	2

3 May
10:44

Spain	10–15	Australia

Dignity Health Sports Park, Los Angeles

3 May
11:06

Fiji	12–17	New Zealand

Dignity Health Sports Park, Los Angeles

3 May
13:45

Spain	7-5	New Zealand

Dignity Health Sports Park, Los Angeles

3 May
14:07

Fiji	14-15	Australia

Dignity Health Sports Park, Los Angeles

3 May
16:51

Australia	19-21	New Zealand

Dignity Health Sports Park, Los Angeles

3 May
17:13

Fiji	12-24	Spain

Dignity Health Sports Park, Los Angeles

=== 5th to 8th playoffs ===
5th place semifinals
4 May 2025– 10:49 – Dignity Health Sports Park
France	31
Fiji	19
4 May 2025– 11:11 – Dignity Health Sports Park
Great Britain	7
Australia	33

5th place final
4 May 2025– 14:29 – Dignity Health Sports Park
France	31
Australia	33
7th place final
4 May 2025– 14:05 – Dignity Health Sports Park
Fiji	19
Great Britain	7

=== Championship ===
Championship semifinals
4 May 2025– 14:08 – Dignity Health Sports Park
Spain	29
Argentina	5
4 May 2025– 14:30 – Dignity Health Sports Park
South Africa	31
New Zealand	5

Championship final
4 May 2025– 18:32 – Dignity Health Sports Park
Spain	5
South Africa	19
Bronze final
4 May 2025– 17:10 – Dignity Health Sports Park
Argentina	17
New Zealand	38

=== Final placings ===
Place	Team	Notes
1st place, gold medalist(s)	South Africa	Grand Final winners
2nd place, silver medalist(s)	Spain	
3rd place, bronze medalist(s)	New Zealand	
4	Argentina	
5	France	
6	Australia	
7	Fiji	
8	Great Britain	

== Grand Finals - Women ==
=== Pool stage ===
Points system: Teams were awarded 3 points for a win, 2 points for a draw and 0 points for a loss. For a loss of 7 points or fewer teams were awarded 1 bonus point.

Key to colours in grand finals pool tables
Teams that advanced to the Championship semifinals
Teams that advanced to the 5th place semifinals

=== Pool A ===
Pos	Team	Pld	W	L	PF	PA	PD	BP	Pts
1	New Zealand	3	3	0	132	24	+108	0	9
2	Canada	3	2	1	57	58	–1	0	6
3	Great Britain	3	1	2	63	74	–11	0	3
4	Japan	3	0	3	14	110	–96	0	0

3 May
10:00

Canada	26–0	Japan

Dignity Health Sports Park, Los Angeles

3 May
10:22

New Zealand	41–12	Great Britain

Dignity Health Sports Park, Los Angeles

3 May
13:01

Canada	26–17	Great Britain

Dignity Health Sports Park, Los Angeles

3 May
13:23

New Zealand	50–7	Japan

Dignity Health Sports Park, Los Angeles

3 May
16:13

Great Britain	34-7	Japan

Dignity Health Sports Park, Los Angeles

3 May
16:29

New Zealand	41-5	Canada

Dignity Health Sports Park, Los Angeles

=== Pool B ===
Pos	Team	Pld	W	L	PF	PA	PD	BP	Pts
1	Australia	3	3	0	92	34	+58	0	9
2	United States	3	2	1	64	57	+7	0	6
3	Fiji	3	1	2	50	79	–29	0	3
4	France	3	0	3	44	80	–36	1	1

3 May
11:13

France	5–21	United States

Dignity Health Sports Park, Los Angeles

3 May
11:50

Australia	26–5	Fiji

Dignity Health Sports Park, Los Angeles

3 May
14:29

France	22-26	Fiji

Dignity Health Sports Park, Los Angeles

3 May
14:51

Australia	33-12	United States

Dignity Health Sports Park, Los Angeles

3 May
17:40

Australia	33-17	France

Dignity Health Sports Park, Los Angeles

3 May
18:02

United States	31-19	Fiji

Dignity Health Sports Park, Los Angeles

=== 5th to 8th playoffs ===
5th place semifinals
4 May 2025– 10:49 – Dignity Health Sports Park
France	17
Great Britain	29
4 May 2025– 11:11 – Dignity Health Sports Park
Japan	14
Fiji	46

5th place final
4 May 2025– 14:29 – Dignity Health Sports Park
Great Britain	17
Fiji	14
7th place final
4 May 2025– 14:05 – Dignity Health Sports Park
France	29
Japan	46

=== Championship ===
Championship semifinals
4 May 2025– 14:08 – Dignity Health Sports Park
Australia	33
Canada	7
4 May 2025– 14:30 – Dignity Health Sports Park
New Zealand	34
United States	7

Championship final
4 May 2025– 18:32 – Dignity Health Sports Park
Australia	7
New Zealand	31
Bronze final
4 May 2025– 17:10 – Dignity Health Sports Park
Canada	27
United States	7

=== Final placings ===
Place	Team	Notes
1st place, gold medalist(s)	New Zealand	Grand Final winners
2nd place, silver medalist(s)	Australia	
3rd place, bronze medalist(s)	Canada	
4	United States	
5	Fiji	
6	Great Britain	
7	Japan	
8	France	

== Playoffs - Men ==
=== Pool stage ===
Points system: Teams were awarded 3 points for a win, 2 points for a draw and 0 points for a loss. For a loss of 7 points or fewer teams were awarded 1 bonus point.

=== Pool A ===
Pos	Team	Pld	W	L	PF	PA	PD	BP	Pts
1	United States	3	3	0	68	46	+22	0	9
2	Samoa	3	2	1	59	49	+10	1	7
3	Kenya	3	1	2	50	50	0	1	5
4	Portugal	3	0	3	41	73	–32	0	0

3 May
11:28

Kenya	12-19	Samoa

Dignity Health Sports Park, Los Angeles

3 May
11:50

United States	26–15	Portugal

Dignity Health Sports Park, Los Angeles

3 May
14:29

United States	25-19	Samoa

Dignity Health Sports Park, Los Angeles

3 May
14:51

Kenya	26-14	Portugal

Dignity Health Sports Park, Los Angeles

4 May
11:28

Kenya	12–17	United States

Dignity Health Sports Park, Los Angeles

4 May
11:50

Portugal	12–21	Samoa

Dignity Health Sports Park, Los Angeles

=== Pool B ===
Pos	Team	Pld	W	L	PF	PA	PD	BP	Pts
1	Uruguay	3	3	0	87	33	+54	0	9
2	Canada	3	2	1	48	53	–5	0	6
3	Germany	3	1	2	46	58	–12	1	4
4	Ireland	3	0	3	24	61	–37	1	1

3 May
10:00

Ireland	0–15	Germany

Dignity Health Sports Park, Los Angeles

3 May
10:22

Uruguay	24–7	Canada

Dignity Health Sports Park, Los Angeles

3 May
13:01

Ireland	12–19	Canada

Dignity Health Sports Park, Los Angeles

3 May
13:23

Uruguay	36–14	Germany

Dignity Health Sports Park, Los Angeles

4 May
12:12

Germany	17-22	Canada

Dignity Health Sports Park, Los Angeles

4 May
12:34

Uruguay	27-12	Ireland

Dignity Health Sports Park, Los Angeles

=== Qualifier Playoffs ===
4 May
16:56

United States	19-12	Ireland

Dignity Health Sports Park, Los Angeles

4 May
17:20

Kenya	24-5	Canada

Dignity Health Sports Park, Los Angeles

4 May
17:44

Samoa	0-31	Germany

Dignity Health Sports Park, Los Angeles

4 May
18:08

Portugal	17-26	Uruguay

Dignity Health Sports Park, Los Angeles

=== Final placings ===
Team	Notes
United States	Qualified for 2025-26 SVNS Division 2
Kenya	Qualified for 2025-26 SVNS Division 2
Uruguay	Qualified for 2025-26 SVNS Division 2
Germany	Promoted to 2025-26 SVNS Division 2
Ireland	Relegated from 2025-26 SVNS
Canada	
Portugal	
Samoa	

== Playoffs - Women ==
=== Pool stage ===
Points system: Teams were awarded 3 points for a win, 2 points for a draw and 0 points for a loss. For a loss of 7 points or fewer teams were awarded 1 bonus point.

=== Pool A ===
Pos	Team	Pld	W	L	PF	PA	PD	BP	Pts
1	Brazil	3	3	0	87	25	+60	0	9
2	Spain	3	2	1	55	40	+15	0	6
3	Kenya	3	1	2	31	616	–35	0	3
4	Colombia	3	0	3	29	69	–40	2	2

3 May
12:12

Spain	33–14	Kenya

Dignity Health Sports Park, Los Angeles

3 May
12:34

Brazil	45–12	Colombia

Dignity Health Sports Park, Los Angeles

3 May
15:13

Spain	17–12	Colombia

Dignity Health Sports Park, Los Angeles

3 May
15:35

Brazil	28–10	Kenya

Dignity Health Sports Park, Los Angeles

3 May
12:12

Spain	33–14	Kenya

Dignity Health Sports Park, Los Angeles

4 May
10:44

Kenya	7–5	Colombia

Dignity Health Sports Park, Los Angeles

4 May
11:06

Brazil	14–5	Spain

Dignity Health Sports Park, Los Angeles

=== Pool B ===
Pos	Team	Pld	W	L	PF	PA	PD	BP	Pts
1	China	3	3	0	69	27	+43	0	9
2	South Africa	3	2	1	41	38	−6	0	6
3	Argentina	3	1	2	34	54	–20	1	4
4	Ireland	3	0	3	32	51	–17	2	2

3 May
10:44

Ireland	5–12	South Africa

Dignity Health Sports Park, Los Angeles

3 May
11:06

Argentina	0–25	China

Dignity Health Sports Park, Los Angeles

3 May
13:45

Ireland	12–20	Argentina

Dignity Health Sports Park, Los Angeles

3 May
14:07

China	26–12	South Africa

Dignity Health Sports Park, Los Angeles

4 May
10:00

South Africa	17–14	Argentina

Dignity Health Sports Park, Los Angeles

4 May
10:22

China	19–15	Ireland

Dignity Health Sports Park, Los Angeles

=== Qualifier Playoffs ===
4 May
15:08

Kenya	17–14	South Africa

Dignity Health Sports Park, Los Angeles

4 May
15:32

Brazil	24–10	Ireland

Dignity Health Sports Park, Los Angeles

4 May
13:56

Spain	28–0	Argentina

Dignity Health Sports Park, Los Angeles

4 May
16:20

Colombia	14–24	China

Dignity Health Sports Park, Los Angeles

=== Final placings ===
Team	Notes
Brazil	Qualified for 2025-26 SVNS Division 2
Spain	Qualified for 2025-26 SVNS Division 2
China	Qualified for 2025-26 SVNS Division 2
Kenya	Promoted to 2025-26 SVNS Division 2
Ireland	Relegated from 2025-26 SVNS
Argentina	
Colombia	
South Africa	

2024–25 SVNS
Preceded by 2025 Singapore Sevens	2025 USA Sevens	Succeeded by None (last event)
