= Simon Désert =

French rugby player (born 2001

- Born: 7 February 2001 (age 25)
- Height: 1.84 m (6 ft 0 in)
- Weight: 80 kg (176 lb)

Rugby union career
- Position: Winger
Senior career
Years	Team	Apps	(Points)
- US Carcassonne
National sevens team
Years	Team		Comps
2024-	France 7s		

Simon Désert (born 7 February 2001) is a French rugby union player. He plays as a winger for US Carcassonne and the France national rugby sevens team. He was nominated for try of the year for the 2024-25 SVNS series.

== Early life ==
He started playing rugby as a six year-old in Trèbes, encouraged by his father Yannick who was also a rugby player. He attended RC Alaric rugby school in Capendu on a weekly basis, before his family relocated to Barbaira.

== Career ==
Désert plays club rugby union for US Carcassonne as a winger. He joined Carcassonne as a 15 year-old, before having spells at Béziers and then Stade Toulousain before returning to Carcassonne. He also played for France at under-18 level.

He was a member of the France rugby sevens Development team which won the first stage of the 2024 Rugby Europe Sevens Championship Series which took place from June 7–9, 2024, in Makarska, Croatia, defeating Ireland 12-7 in the final. In the second leg of the championships in Hamburg, Germany the same month he scored a try in the final as France lost to Ireland, but the French side were crowned European champions, on scoring difference across the two events.

He made his debut at the South Africa Sevens in Cape Town for the France national rugby sevens team in December 2024. During that tournament he scored a try against Fiji in the semi-final for which he earned a nomination for the best try of the year for the 2024-25 SVNS series. He also played as France reached the final of the Hong Kong sevens in March 2025.
