= 2025 Hong Kong Sevens =

World Rugby Sevens Series tournaments

- 2024–25 SVNS
- Host nation: HKG

Men
- Date: 28–30 March
- Champion: Argentina
- Runner-up: France
- Third: Australia

Women
- Date: 28-30 March
- Champion: New Zealand
- Runner-up: Australia
- Third: Canada

Tournament details
- Matches played: 64

The 2025 Hong Kong Sevens or SVNS HKG was a rugby sevens tournament played at Kai Tak Stadium. Twelve men's teams and a similar number of women's teams participated.

In addition to the SVNS tournament, there was also an invitational competition called the Melrose Claymores.

== Men's tournament ==
=== Pool stage ===
Points system: Teams were awarded 3 points for a win, 2 points for a draw and 0 points for a loss. For a loss of 7 points or fewer teams were awarded 1 bonus point.

Key to colours in group tables
Teams that advanced to the cup quarterfinals
Teams that advanced to the 9th place semifinals

=== Pool A ===
Pos	Team	Pld	W	L	PF	PA	PD	BP	Pts
1	Argentina	3	3	0	122	19	+103	0	9
2	Fiji	3	2	1	54	75	–21	0	6
3	Ireland	3	1	2	45	66	–21	1	4
4	United States	3	0	3	36	97	–61	1	1

28 March

Fiji	26–21	United States

Kai Tak Stadium, Hong Kong

28 March

Argentina	35–7	Ireland

Kai Tak Stadium, Hong Kong

28 March

Fiji	21–19	Ireland

Kai Tak Stadium, Hong Kong

28 March

Argentina	52–5	United States

Kai Tak Stadium, Hong Kong

29 March

United States	10–19	Ireland

Kai Tak Stadium, Hong Kong

29 March

Argentina	35–7	Fiji

Kai Tak Stadium, Hong Kong

=== Pool B ===
Pos	Team	Pld	W	L	PF	PA	PD	BP	Pts
1	New Zealand	3	3	0	67	19	+48	0	9
2	Australia	3	2	1	66	40	+26	0	6
3	South Africa	3	1	2	54	50	+4	0	3
4	Uruguay	3	0	3	19	97	–78	0	0

28 March

New Zealand	21–12	Australia

Kai Tak Stadium, Hong Kong

28 March

South Africa	40–7	Uruguay

Kai Tak Stadium, Hong Kong

28 March

New Zealand	29–0	Uruguay

Kai Tak Stadium, Hong Kong

28 March

South Africa	7–26	Australia

Kai Tak Stadium, Hong Kong

29 March

Australia	28–12	Uruguay

Kai Tak Stadium, Hong Kong

29 March

South Africa	7–17	New Zealand

Kai Tak Stadium, Hong Kong

=== Pool C ===
Pos	Team	Pld	W	L	PF	PA	PD	BP	Pts
1	Spain	3	2	1	45	43	+2	0	6
2	Great Britain	3	2	1	36	40	–4	0	6
3	France	3	1	2	33	38	–5	2	5
4	Kenya	3	1	2	33	26	+7	2	5

28 March

Great Britain	12–7	France

Kai Tak Stadium, Hong Kong

28 March

Spain	0–19	Kenya

Kai Tak Stadium, Hong Kong

28 March

Great Britain	12–7	Kenya

Kai Tak Stadium, Hong Kong

28 March

Spain	19–7	France

Kai Tak Stadium, Hong Kong

29 March

France	14–7	Kenya

Kai Tak Stadium, Hong Kong

29 March

Spain	26–12	Great Britain

Kai Tak Stadium, Hong Kong

=== Melrose Claymores ===
Points system: Teams were awarded 3 points for a win, 2 points for a draw and 1 point for a loss. No bounus points were awarded.

Key to colours in Melrose Claymores table
Teams that advanced to the Melrose Claymores Final
Teams that are eliminated from the Melrose Claymores tournament

Melrose Claymores table
Pos	Team	Pld	W	D	L	PF	PA	PD	BP	Pts
1	Hong Kong	2	2	0	74	28	+46	0	6	
2	China	2	1	1	38	38	0	0	3	
3	Japan	2	0	2	28	74	–46	0	0	

28 March
19:21

Hong Kong	31–7	China

Kai Tak Stadium, Hong Kong

29 March
15:20

Hong Kong	43–21	Japan

Kai Tak Stadium, Hong Kong

7 April
10:37

China	31–7	Japan

Kai Tak Stadium, Hong Kong

=== Melrose Claymores Final ===
30 March
19:19

Hong Kong	38–5	China

Kai Tak Stadium, Hong Kong

=== 9th to 12th playoffs ===
9th place semifinals
29 March 2025 – Kai Tak Stadium
Kenya	17
United States	10
29 March 2025 – Kai Tak Stadium
South Africa	33
Uruguay	7

9th place final
30 March 2025 – Kai Tak Stadium
Kenya	17
South Africa	19
11th place final
30 March 2025 – Kai Tak Stadium
United States	14
Uruguay	21

=== 5th to 8th playoffs ===
Key to colours in table
Teams that advanced to the 5th place final
Teams that advanced to the 7th place final

Team	Point Differential
New Zealand	+41
Spain	+4
Ireland	–29
Great Britain	–33

Fifth Place

30 March

New Zealand	24–5	Spain

Kai Tak Stadium, Hong Kong

Seventh Place

30 March

Great Britain	12–28	Ireland

Kai Tak Stadium, Hong Kong

=== Cup ===
Quarterfinals
29 March 2025 – Kai Tak Stadium
Australia	34
Great Britain	5
29 March 2025 – Kai Tak Stadium
Argentina	22
Ireland	14
29 March 2025 – Kai Tak Stadium
Spain	28
Fiji	31
29 March 2025 – Kai Tak Stadium
New Zealand	14
France	21

Semifinals
30 March 2025 – Kai Tak Stadium
Australia	7
Argentina	31
30 March 2025 – Kai Tak Stadium
Fiji	17
France	24

Final
30 March 2025 – Kai Tak Stadium
Argentina	12
France	7
Bronze final
30 March 2025 – Kai Tak Stadium
Australia	22
Fiji	21

=== Final placings ===
Place	Team
1st place, gold medalist(s)	Argentina
2nd place, silver medalist(s)	France
3rd place, bronze medalist(s)	Australia
4	Fiji
5	New Zealand
6	Spain
7	Ireland
8	Great Britain
9	South Africa
10	Kenya
11	Uruguay
12	United States

== Women's tournament ==
=== Pool stage ===
Points system: Teams were awarded 3 points for a win, 2 points for a draw and 0 points for a loss. For a loss of 7 points or fewer teams were awarded 1 bonus point.

Key to colours in group tables
Teams that advanced to the cup quarterfinals
Teams that advanced to the 9th place semifinals

=== Pool A ===
Pos	Team	Pld	W	L	PF	PA	PD	BP	Pts
1	New Zealand	3	3	0	107	28	+79	0	9
2	United States	3	2	1	76	55	+21	0	6
3	Brazil	3	1	2	55	70	–15	0	3
4	China	3	0	3	20	105	–85	0	0

28 March

Brazil	12–31	United States

Kai Tak Stadium, Hong Kong

28 March

New Zealand	45–0	China

Kai Tak Stadium, Hong Kong

28 March

Brazil	36–10	China

Kai Tak Stadium, Hong Kong

28 March

New Zealand	33–21	United States

Kai Tak Stadium, Hong Kong

29 March

United States	24–10	China

Kai Tak Stadium, Hong Kong

29 March

New Zealand	29–7	Brazil

Kai Tak Stadium, Hong Kong

=== Pool B ===
Pos	Team	Pld	W	L	PF	PA	PD	BP	Pts
1	France	3	3	0	63	38	+25	0	9
2	Fiji	3	2	1	64	46	+18	0	6
3	Great Britain	3	1	2	45	63	–18	0	3
4	Ireland	3	0	3	46	71	–25	1	1

28 March

Great Britain	12–22	France

Kai Tak Stadium, Hong Kong

28 March

Fiji	26–17	Ireland

Kai Tak Stadium, Hong Kong

28 March

Great Britain	28–17	Ireland

Kai Tak Stadium, Hong Kong

28 March

Fiji	14–24	France

Kai Tak Stadium, Hong Kong

29 March

France	17–12	Ireland

Kai Tak Stadium, Hong Kong

29 March

Fiji	24–5	Great Britain

Kai Tak Stadium, Hong Kong

=== Pool C ===
Pos	Team	Pld	W	L	PF	PA	PD	BP	Pts
1	Australia	3	3	0	94	37	+57	0	9
2	Canada	3	2	1	68	53	+15	0	6
3	Japan	3	1	2	51	57	–6	2	5
4	Spain	3	0	3	41	107	–66	1	1

28 March

Japan	17–24	Canada

Kai Tak Stadium, Hong Kong

28 March

Australia	54–12	Spain

Kai Tak Stadium, Hong Kong

28 March

Japan	24–19	Spain

Kai Tak Stadium, Hong Kong

28 March

Australia	26–15	Canada

Kai Tak Stadium, Hong Kong

29 March

Canada	29–10	Spain

Kai Tak Stadium, Hong Kong

29 March

Australia	14–10	Japan

Kai Tak Stadium, Hong Kong

=== Melrose Claymores ===
Points system: Teams were awarded 3 points for a win, 2 points for a draw and 1 point for a loss. No bounus points were awarded.

Key to colours in Melrose Claymores table
Teams that advanced to the Melrose Claymores Final
Teams that are eliminated from the Melrose Claymores tournament

Melrose Claymores table
Pos	Team	Pld	W	D	L	PF	PA	PD	BP	Pts
1	Hong Kong	2	2	0	76	14	62	0	6	
2	Kazakhstan	2	1	1	45	29	16	0	3	
3	Thailand	2	0	2	0	78	-78	0	0	

28 March
18:36

Hong Kong	29–14	Kazakhstan

Kai Tak Stadium, Hong Kong

29 March
14:20

Hong Kong	47–0	Thailand

Kai Tak Stadium, Hong Kong

30 March
10:14

Kazakhstan	31–0	Thailand

Kai Tak Stadium, Hong Kong

=== Melrose Claymores Final ===
30 April
18:34

Hong Kong	45–5	Kazakhstan

Kai Tak Stadium, Hong Kong

=== 9th to 12th playoffs ===
9th place semifinals
29 March 2025 – Kai Tak Stadium
Ireland	7
Spain	17
29 March 2025 – Kai Tak Stadium
Great Britain	19
China	24

9th place final
30 March 2025 – Kai Tak Stadium
Spain	7
China	12
11th place final
30 March 2025 – Kai Tak Stadium
Ireland	5
Great Britain	32

=== 5th to 8th playoffs ===
Key to colours in table
Teams that advanced to the 5th place final
Teams that advanced to the 7th place final

Team	Point Differential
Fiji	+9
United States	–9
Brazil	–39
Japan	–40

Fifth Place

30 March

United States	7–19	Fiji

Kai Tak Stadium, Hong Kong

Seventh Place

30 March

Japan	32–14	Brazil

Kai Tak Stadium, Hong Kong

=== Cup ===
Quarterfinals
29 March 2025 – Kai Tak Stadium
Fiji	17
Canada	26
29 March 2025 – Kai Tak Stadium
New Zealand	31
Brazil	7
29 March 2025 – Kai Tak Stadium
Australia	35
United States	5
29 March 2025 – Kai Tak Stadium
France	34
Japan	0

Semifinals
30 March 2025 – Kai Tak Stadium
Canada	0
New Zealand	41
30 March 2025 – Kai Tak Stadium
Australia	28
France	5

Final
30 March 2025 – Kai Tak Stadium
New Zealand	26
Australia	19
Bronze final
30 March 2025 – Kai Tak Stadium
Canada	21
France	17

=== Final placings ===
Place	Team
1st place, gold medalist(s)	New Zealand
2nd place, silver medalist(s)	Australia
3rd place, bronze medalist(s)	Canada
4	France
5	Fiji
6	United States
7	Japan
8	Brazil
9	China
10	Spain
11	Great Britain
12	Ireland

== Cathay Pacific Flyover ==
On March 30th, the third day of the Sevens, Cathay Pacific Flight CX8100 flew over Victoria Harbour to celebrate the 100th anniversary of Kai Tak Airport, where the Kai Tak Stadium was located. The tribute flight was broadcast on a large LED screen in the stadium, but it was not well received by the attendees, as they were mistakenly instructed to look up through the open roof instead of the South Stand, where the plane flew past.

2024–25 SVNS
Preceded by 2025 Canada Sevens	2025 Canada Sevens	Succeeded by 2025 Singapore Sevens
