= 2024 Dubai Sevens =

World Rugby Sevens Series tournaments

- 2024–25 SVNS
- Host nation: UAE

Men
- Date: 30 November–1 December 2024
- Champion: Fiji
- Runner-up: Spain
- Third: Argentina

Women
- Date: 30 November–1 December 2024
- Champion: Australia
- Runner-up: New Zealand
- Third: France

Tournament details
- Matches played: 64

The 2024 Dubai Sevens or SVNS DXB was a rugby sevens tournament played at The Sevens. Twelve men's teams and twelve women's teams participated.

Fiji won the men's event defeating Spain in the final. Australia won the women's event and their fourth consecutive title in Dubai, defeating New Zealand in the final.

== Men's tournament ==
=== Pool stage ===
Points system: Teams were awarded 3 points for a win, 2 points for a draw and 0 points for a loss. For a loss of 7 points or fewer teams were awarded 1 bonus point.

Key to colours in pool tables
Teams that advanced to the cup quarterfinals
Teams that advanced to the 9th place semifinals

=== Pool A ===
Pos	Team	Pld	W	L	PF	PA	PD	BP	Pts
1	South Africa	3	2	1	58	41	+17	1	7
2	France	3	2	1	57	53	+4	1	7
3	Australia	3	1	2	41	45	–4	2	5
4	Kenya	3	1	2	55	72	–17	2	5

30 November
00:00

South Africa	17–0	Australia

The Sevens Stadium, Dubai

30 November
00:00

France	24–19 (a.e.t.)	Kenya

The Sevens Stadium, Dubai

30 November
00:00

Kenya	22–17	South Africa

The Sevens Stadium, Dubai

30 November
00:00

France	14–10	Australia

The Sevens Stadium, Dubai

30 November
00:00

Australia	31–14	Kenya

The Sevens Stadium, Dubai

30 November
00:00

France	19–24 (a.e.t.)	South Africa

The Sevens Stadium, Dubai

=== Pool B ===
Pos	Team	Pld	W	L	PF	PA	PD	BP	Pts
1	Argentina	3	3	0	96	19	+77	0	9
2	Great Britain	3	2	1	58	49	+9	0	6
3	Uruguay	3	1	2	43	90	–47	2	5
4	Ireland	3	0	3	38	77	–39	1	4

30 November
00:00

Ireland	17–22 (a.e.t.)	Great Britain

The Sevens Stadium, Dubai

30 November
00:00

Argentina	45–7	Uruguay

The Sevens Stadium, Dubai

30 November
00:00

Uruguay	26–14	Ireland

The Sevens Stadium, Dubai

30 November
00:00

Argentina	22–5	Great Britain

The Sevens Stadium, Dubai

30 November
00:00

Great Britain	31–10	Uruguay

The Sevens Stadium, Dubai

30 November
00:00

Argentina	29–7	Ireland

The Sevens Stadium, Dubai

=== Pool C ===
Pos	Team	Pld	W	L	PF	PA	PD	BP	Pts
1	Fiji	3	3	0	84	47	+37	0	9
2	Spain	3	2	1	67	35	+32	1	7
3	New Zealand	3	1	2	54	59	–5	2	5
4	United States	3	0	3	32	96	–64	3	3

30 November
00:00

Fiji	21–15	Spain

The Sevens Stadium, Dubai

30 November
00:00

New Zealand	28–12	United States

The Sevens Stadium, Dubai

30 November
00:00

Spain	26–14	New Zealand

The Sevens Stadium, Dubai

30 November
00:00

Fiji	42–20	United States

The Sevens Stadium, Dubai

30 November
00:00

United States	0–28	Spain

The Sevens Stadium, Dubai

30 November
00:00

Fiji	21–12	New Zealand

The Sevens Stadium, Dubai

=== 9th to 12th playoffs ===
9th place semifinals
1 December 2024– 00:00 – The Sevens Stadium
Uruguay	15
United States	12
1 December 2024– 00:00 – The Sevens Stadium
Kenya	21
Ireland	7

9th place final
1 December 2024– 00:00 – The Sevens Stadium
Uruguay	15
Kenya	7
11th place final
1 December 2024– 00:00 – The Sevens Stadium
United States	12
Ireland	19

=== 5th to 8th playoffs ===
Ranking of Cup Quarterfinal Losers
Team	Pos	Original Pool Finish	Pld	PF	PA	PD	Qualification
1	South Africa	1st (Pool A)	4	75	65	+10	Qualified for 5th Place Final
2	France	2nd (Pool A)	4	74	72	+2	Qualified for 5th Place Final
3	Great Britain	2nd (Pool B)	4	72	68	+4	Qualified for 7th Place Final
4	Australia	3rd (Pool A)	4	61	67	−6	Qualified for 7th Place Final
Tie-breaker notes: Teams are ranked primarily by their original pool stage finish. South Africa and France automatically outrank Australia and Great Britain regardless of statistics due to finishing 1st and 2nd in their pools respectively rather than 3rd.; Great Britain is ranked ahead of Australia for having the highest points difference between the two teams across all 3 pool stage matches and cup quarter-final match (Great Britain's +4 vs Australia's −6).

Seventh place final

1 December
00:00

Great Britain	12–17	Australia

The Sevens Stadium, Dubai

Fifth place final

1 December
00:00

South Africa	15–17	France

The Sevens Stadium, Dubai

=== Cup ===
Quarterfinals
1 December 2024– 00:00 – The Sevens Stadium
Great Britain	14
Spain	19
1 December 2024– 00:00 – The Sevens Stadium
South Africa	17
New Zealand	24
1 December 2024– 00:00 – The Sevens Stadium
Fiji	19
France	17
1 December 2024– 00:00 – The Sevens Stadium
Argentina	22
Australia	20

Semifinals
1 December 2024– 00:00 – The Sevens Stadium
Spain	19
New Zealand	14
1 December 2024– 00:00 – The Sevens Stadium
Fiji	43
Argentina	21

Final
1 December 2024– 00:00 – The Sevens Stadium
Spain	5
Fiji	17
Bronze final
1 December 2024– 00:00 – The Sevens Stadium
New Zealand	0
Argentina	14

=== Final placings ===
Place	Team
1st place, gold medalist(s)	Fiji
2nd place, silver medalist(s)	Spain
3rd place, bronze medalist(s)	Argentina
4	New Zealand
5	France
6	South Africa
7	Australia
8	Great Britain
9	Uruguay
10	Kenya
11	Ireland
12	United States

=== Dream Team ===
Player	Country
Leroy Carter	New Zealand
Scott Curry	New Zealand
Selvyn Davids	South Africa
Rosko Specman	South Africa
Marcos Moneta	Argentina
Germán Schulz	Argentina
Terio Veilawa	Fiji

== Women's tournament ==
=== Pool stage ===
Points system: Teams were awarded 3 points for a win, 2 points for a draw and 0 points for a loss. For a loss of 7 points or fewer teams were awarded 1 bonus point.

Key to colours in pool tables
Teams that advanced to the cup quarterfinals
Teams that advanced to the 9th place semifinals

=== Pool A ===
Pos	Team	Pld	W	L	PF	PA	PD	BP	Pts
1	Australia	3	3	0	120	12	+108	0	9
2	Ireland	3	2	1	66	57	+9	0	6
3	China	3	1	2	36	99	–63	0	3
4	Fiji	3	0	3	33	87	–54	1	1

2 December
00:00

Ireland	30–12	Fiji

The Sevens Stadium, Dubai

2 December
00:00

Australia	54–0	China

The Sevens Stadium, Dubai

2 December
00:00

China	21–31	Ireland

The Sevens Stadium, Dubai

2 December
00:00

Australia	43–7	Fiji

The Sevens Stadium, Dubai

2 December
00:00

Fiji	14–15	China

The Sevens Stadium, Dubai

2 December
00:00

Australia	24–5	Ireland

The Sevens Stadium, Dubai

=== Pool B ===
Pos	Team	Pld	W	L	PF	PA	PD	BP	Pts
1	United States	3	2	1	64	36	+28	0	6
2	Great Britain	3	2	1	53	50	+3	0	6
3	France	3	1	2	38	43	–5	1	4
4	Spain	3	1	2	43	69	–26	0	3

2 December
00:00

Great Britain	24–12	Spain

The Sevens Stadium, Dubai

2 December
00:00

France	14–5	United States

The Sevens Stadium, Dubai

2 December
00:00

Great Britain	14–12	France

The Sevens Stadium, Dubai

2 December
00:00

United States	33–7	Spain

The Sevens Stadium, Dubai

2 December
00:00

France	12–24	Spain

The Sevens Stadium, Dubai

2 December
00:00

United States	26–15	Great Britain

The Sevens Stadium, Dubai

=== Pool C ===
Pos	Team	Pld	W	L	PF	PA	PD	BP	Pts
1	New Zealand	3	3	0	107	27	+80	0	9
2	Japan	3	1	2	66	62	+8	1	4
3	Canada	3	1	2	53	90	–37	0	3
4	Brazil	3	1	2	34	85	–51	0	3

2 December
00:00

Japan	14–17	Brazil

The Sevens Stadium, Dubai

2 December
00:00

New Zealand	38–10	Canada

The Sevens Stadium, Dubai

2 December
00:00

Japan	12–36	New Zealand

The Sevens Stadium, Dubai

2 December
00:00

Canada	38–12	Brazil

The Sevens Stadium, Dubai

2 December
00:00

New Zealand	33–5	Brazil

The Sevens Stadium, Dubai

2 December
00:00

Canada	5–40	Japan

The Sevens Stadium, Dubai

=== 9th to 12th playoffs ===
9th place semifinals
3 December 2023– 00:00 – The Sevens Stadium
China	24
Fiji	7
3 December 2023– 00:00 – The Sevens Stadium
Spain	15
Brazil	29

9th place final
3 December 2023– 00:00 – The Sevens Stadium
China	17
Brazil	24
11th place final
3 December 2023– 00:00 – The Sevens Stadium
Fiji	5
Spain	22

=== 5th to 8th playoffs ===
Ranking of Cup Quarterfinal Losers
Pos	Team	Original Pool Finish	Pld	PF	PA	PD	Qualification
1	United States	1st (Pool C)	4	76	74	+2	Qualified for 5th Place Final
2	Ireland	2nd (Pool A)	4	78	90	–12	Qualified for 5th Place Final
3	Japan	2nd (Pool C)	4	66	88	–22	Qualified for 7th Place Final
4	Canada	3rd (Pool C)	4	53	+129	–76	Qualified for 7th Place Final
Tie-breaker notes: Teams are ranked primarily by their original pool stage finish. United States automatically outrank Ireland, Japan and Canada regardless of statistics due to finishing 1st in their pool rather than 2nd or 3rd.; Ireland is ranked ahead of Japan for having the highest points difference between the two teams across all 3 pool stage matches and cup quarter-final match (Ireland's –12 vs Japan's –22).

Seventh place

3 December
00:00

Japan	24–22	Canada

The Sevens Stadium, Dubai

Fifth place

3 December
00:00

United States	17–7	Ireland

The Sevens Stadium, Dubai

=== Cup ===
Quarterfinals
3 December 2023– 00:00 – The Sevens Stadium
Great Britain	26
Japan	0
3 December 2023– 00:00 – The Sevens Stadium
Australia	39
Canada	0
3 December 2023– 00:00 – The Sevens Stadium
New Zealand	33
Ireland	12
3 December 2023– 00:00 – The Sevens Stadium
United States	12
France	38

Semifinals
3 December 2023– 00:00 – The Sevens Stadium
Great Britain	7
Australia	38
3 December 2023– 00:00 – The Sevens Stadium
New Zealand	28
France	14

Final
3 December 2023– 00:00 – The Sevens Stadium
Australia	28
New Zealand	24
Bronze final
3 December 2023– 00:00 – The Sevens Stadium
Great Britain	12
France	15

=== Final placings ===
Place	Team
1st place, gold medalist(s)	Australia
2nd place, silver medalist(s)	New Zealand
3rd place, bronze medalist(s)	France
4	Great Britain
5	United States
6	Ireland
7	Japan
8	Canada
9	Brazil
10	China
11	Spain
12	Fiji

=== Dream Team ===
Player	Country
Charlotte Caslick	Australia
Maddison Levi	Australia
Teagan Levi	Australia
Jorja Miller	New Zealand
Anne-Cécile Ciofani	France
Florence Symonds	Canada
Reapi Ulunisau	Fiji

2024–25 SVNS
Preceded by None (first event)	2024 Dubai Sevens	Succeeded by 2024 South Africa Sevens
