= 2025 Australia Sevens =

World Rugby Sevens Series tournaments

- 2024–25 SVNS
- Host nation: Australia

Men
- Date: 24 January–26 January
- Champion: Argentina
- Runner-up: Australia
- Third: Spain

Women
- Date: 24 January–26 January
- Champion: Australia
- Runner-up: New Zealand
- Third: France

Tournament details
- Matches played: 64

The 2025 Australia Sevens or SVNS PER was a rugby sevens tournament played at HBF Park. Twelve men's teams and a similar number of women's teams participated.

== Men's tournament ==
=== Pool stage ===
Points system: Teams were awarded 3 points for a win, 2 points for a draw and 0 points for a loss. For a loss of 7 points or fewer teams were awarded 1 bonus point.

Key to colours in pool tables
Teams that advanced to the cup quarterfinals
Teams that advanced to the 9th place semifinals

=== Pool A ===
Pos	Team	Pld	W	L	PF	PA	PD	BP	Pts
1	South Africa	3	2	1	51	45	+6	1	7
2	Argentina	3	2	1	69	67	+2	1	7
3	Australia	3	1	2	52	53	−1	2	5
4	United States	3	1	2	55	62	−7	2	5

24 January

Argentina	31–26	Australia

HBF Park, Perth

24 January

South Africa	24–19	United States

HBF Park, Perth

24 January

Argentina	19–24	United States

HBF Park, Perth

24 January

South Africa	10–7	Australia

HBF Park, Perth

25 January

Australia	19–12	United States

HBF Park, Perth

25 January

South Africa	17–19	Argentina

HBF Park, Perth

=== Pool B ===
Pos	Team	Pld	W	L	PF	PA	PD	BP	Pts
1	France	3	3	0	47	12	+35	0	9
2	Spain	3	2	1	40	33	+7	0	6
3	Great Britain	3	1	2	24	24	0	1	4
4	Ireland	3	0	3	10	52	−42	0	0

24 January

Spain	12–7	Great Britain

HBF Park, Perth

24 January

France	14–5	Ireland

HBF Park, Perth

24 January

Spain	21–5	Ireland

HBF Park, Perth

24 January

France	12–0	Great Britain

HBF Park, Perth

25 January

Great Britain	17–0	Ireland

HBF Park, Perth

25 January

France	21–7	Spain

HBF Park, Perth

=== Pool C ===
Pos	Team	Pld	W	L	PF	PA	PD	BP	Pts
1	Fiji	3	2	1	71	43	+28	1	7
2	Uruguay	3	2	1	46	48	−2	0	6
3	Kenya	3	1	2	47	55	−8	1	4
4	New Zealand	3	1	2	46	64	−18	1	4

24 January

New Zealand	29–14	Kenya

HBF Park, Perth

24 January

Fiji	17–24	Uruguay

HBF Park, Perth

24 January

New Zealand	12–17	Uruguay

HBF Park, Perth

24 January

Fiji	21–14	Kenya

HBF Park, Perth

25 January

Kenya	19–5	Uruguay

HBF Park, Perth

25 January

Fiji	33–5	New Zealand

HBF Park, Perth

=== 9th to 12th playoffs ===
9th place semifinals
25 January 2025 – HBF Park
United States	21
Kenya	26
25 January 2025 – HBF Park
New Zealand	42
Ireland	5

9th place final
26 January 2025 – HBF Park
Kenya	12
New Zealand	19
11th place final
26 January 2025 – HBF Park
United States	17
Ireland	19

=== 5th to 8th playoffs ===
Key to colours in table
Teams that advanced to the 5th place final
Teams that advanced to the 7th place final

Team	Point Differential
France	+23
Fiji	+9
Great Britain	–13
Uruguay	–40

Fifth Place

26 January

France	5–17	Fiji

HBF Park, Perth

Seventh Place

26 January

Uruguay	7–33	Great Britain

HBF Park, Perth

=== Cup ===
Quarterfinals
25 January 2025 – HBF Park
Spain	38
Uruguay	0
25 January 2025 – HBF Park
Argentina	27
Great Britain	14
25 January 2025 – HBF Park
Fiji	0
South Africa	19
25 January 2025 – HBF Park
France	12
Australia	24

Semifinals
26 January 2025 – HBF Park
Spain	5
Argentina	40
26 January 2025 – HBF Park
South Africa	12
Australia	17 (a.e.t.)

Final
26 January 2025 – HBF Park
Argentina	41
Australia	5
Bronze final
26 January 2025 – HBF Park
Spain	14
South Africa	7

=== Final placings ===
Place	Team
1st place, gold medalist(s)	Argentina
2nd place, silver medalist(s)	Australia
3rd place, bronze medalist(s)	Spain
4	South Africa
5	Fiji
6	France
7	Great Britain
8	Uruguay
9	New Zealand
10	Kenya
11	Ireland
12	United States

== Women's tournament ==
=== Pool stage ===
Points system: Teams were awarded 3 points for a win, 2 points for a draw and 0 points for a loss. For a loss of 7 points or fewer teams were awarded 1 bonus point.

Key to colours in pool tables
Teams that advanced to the cup quarterfinals
Teams that advanced to the 9th place semifinals

=== Pool A ===
Pos	Team	Pld	W	L	PF	PA	PD	BP	Pts
1	New Zealand	3	3	0	149	12	+137	0	9
2	Japan	3	2	1	38	72	−34	0	6
3	Brazil	3	1	2	45	74	−29	1	4
4	Ireland	3	0	3	12	86	−74	1	1

24 January

Japan	14–7	Ireland

HBF Park, Perth

24 January

New Zealand	50–7	Brazil

HBF Park, Perth

24 January

Japan	19–12	Brazil

HBF Park, Perth

24 January

New Zealand	46–0	Ireland

HBF Park, Perth

25 January

Ireland	5–26	Brazil

HBF Park, Perth

25 January

New Zealand	53–5	Japan

HBF Park, Perth

=== Pool B ===
Pos	Team	Pld	W	L	PF	PA	PD	BP	Pts
1	Canada	3	3	0	73	24	+49	0	9
2	United States	3	2	1	54	45	+9	0	6
3	Great Britain	3	1	2	37	78	−41	0	3
4	Fiji	3	0	3	45	62	−17	2	2

24 January

Canada	38–5	Great Britain

HBF Park, Perth

24 January

United States	21–19	Fiji

HBF Park, Perth

24 January

Canada	14–12	Fiji

HBF Park, Perth

24 January

United States	26–5	Great Britain

HBF Park, Perth

25 January

Great Britain	27–14	Fiji

HBF Park, Perth

25 January

United States	7–21	Canada

HBF Park, Perth

=== Pool C ===
Pos	Team	Pld	W	L	PF	PA	PD	BP	Pts
1	Australia	3	3	0	114	12	+102	0	9
2	France	3	2	1	59	45	+14	0	6
3	China	3	1	2	21	52	−31	0	3
4	Spain	3	0	3	5	90	−85	0	0

24 January

Australia	31–7	China

HBF Park, Perth

24 January

France	33–5	Spain

HBF Park, Perth

24 January

France	21–0	China

HBF Park, Perth

24 January

Australia	43–0	Spain

HBF Park, Perth

25 January

China	14–0	Spain

HBF Park, Perth

25 January

France	5–40	Australia

HBF Park, Perth

=== 9th to 12th playoffs ===
9th place semifinals
25 January – HBF Park
Fiji	24
Ireland	7
25 January – HBF Park
Great Britain	21
Spain	5

9th place final
26 January – HBF Park
Fiji	26
Great Britain	17
11th place final
26 January – HBF Park
Ireland	12
Spain	24

=== 5th to 8th playoffs ===
Fifth Place

26 January

United States	22–29	Japan

HBF Park, Perth

Seventh Place

26 January

Brazil	21–19	China

HBF Park, Perth

=== Cup ===
Quarterfinals
25 January – HBF Park
United States	7
France	19
25 January – HBF Park
New Zealand	29
China	0
25 January – HBF Park
Australia	35
Japan	0
25 January – HBF Park
Canada	27
Brazil	5

Semifinals
26 January – HBF Park
France	7
New Zealand	36
26 January – HBF Park
Australia	24
Canada	17

Final
26 January – HBF Park
New Zealand	26
Australia	28
Bronze final
26 January – HBF Park
France	14
Canada	7

=== Final placings ===
Place	Team
1st place, gold medalist(s)	Australia
2nd place, silver medalist(s)	New Zealand
3rd place, bronze medalist(s)	France
4	Canada
5	Japan
6	United States
7	Brazil
8	China
9	Fiji
10	Great Britain
11	Spain
12	Ireland

2024–25 SVNS
Preceded by 2024 South Africa Sevens	2025 Australia Sevens	Succeeded by 2025 Canada Sevens
