= Santino Zangara =

Argentine rugby sevens player

- Full name: Santino Zangara
- Born: 8 June 2004 (age 22) Córdoba, Argentina
- Height: 190 cm (6 ft 3 in)
- Weight: 99 kg (218 lb; 15 st 8 lb)

Rugby union career
- Position: Forward / Centre
National sevens team
Years	Team	Comps
2024–Present	Argentina	

Santino Zangara (born 8 June 2004) is an Argentine rugby sevens player who plays for the Argentina national rugby sevens team.
