= Enahemo Artaud =

French rugby player (born 2003

- Born: 25 October 2003 (age 23)
- Height: 1.92 m (6 ft 4 in)
- Weight: 82 kg (181 lb)

Rugby union career
- Position: Fly half
Senior career
| Years | Team | Apps | (Points) |
- US Carcassonne
National sevens team
| Years | Team | | Comps |
| 2024- | France 7s | | |

Enahemo Artaud (born 25 October 2003) is a French rugby union player. He plays as a Fly half for US Carcassonne and the France national rugby sevens team. He was named Rookie of the Year for the 2024-25 SVNS series.

== Career ==
He plays club rugby for Championnat Fédéral Nationale club US Carcassonne. He was a member of the France rugby sevens Development team which won the first stage of the 2024 Rugby Europe Sevens Championship Series which took place from June 7–9, 2024, in Makarska, Croatia, defeating Ireland 12-7 in the final in which he score two tries. He also featured in the second leg of the championships in Hamburg, Germany the same month as France lost to Ireland in the final, but were crowned European champions, on scoring difference across the two events.

Artaud made his first appearances for France Sevens at the Dubai Sevens in the 2024-25 SVNS series. In his second tournament in Cape Town at the South Africa Sevens, he played a pivotal role in France's semi-final victory over Fiji, successfully making a difficult conversion from out wide in the final moments to seal the win.

In May 2025, he was named Rookie of the Year for the 2024-25 SVNS season. In doing so, he succeeded Antoine Dupont, winner of the award in 2024. Continuing with France for the 2025-26 SVNS, he played as France won the 2026 France Sevens in Bordeaux in June 2026, defeating New Zealand 14-5 in the final.
