= Ryan Santos =

- Born: October 15, 1999 (age 27) Manila, Philippines
- Height: 6 ft 5 in (196 cm)
- Weight: 240 lb (109 kg)
- School: International School Manila
- University: Harvard University (AB); University of Cambridge (MPhil)

Rugby union career
- Position(s): Center, Wing
Senior career
Years	Team	Apps	(Points)
2011–2019	Makati Mavericks		
2016	North Harbour Rugby Union		
National sevens team
Years	Team		Comps
2023–	United States		9

Ryan Santos (born October 15, 1999) is an American rugby sevens player who plays for the United States national rugby sevens team.

== Early life and education ==
Ryan Santos was born in Manila, Philippines on October 15, 1999. He is the eldest of three children of Rick and Bonnie Santos. Rick Santos is the chairman and CEO of the Makati-based property consultancy firm, Santos Knight Frank . Ryan's brothers Reed and Rand would also grow up to be rugby players.

Ryan Santos lived in Hong Kong for four years from 2006. He took up mini-rugby with the Valley Fort Rugby Club. He and his family moved back to the Philippines in December 2009. Santos played rugby with eventual England national player Marcus Smith.

He studied at the International School Manila (ISM) and was a student athlete in soccer, baseball, basketball, and track and field and competed at the Interscholastic Association of Southeast Asian Schools for ISM.

In 2018, Santos enrolled at Harvard University in Massachusetts, where he studied history and economics. He graduated in 2023 with cum laude in field honors. After a season as a full-time resident athlete with the United States men's national rugby sevens team, he enrolled at the University of Cambridge in England, completing a Master of Philosophy in Management in 2025.

== Career ==
=== Early years ===
Upon his return from Hong Kong, Santos played rugby with the Bahay Bata Orphanage. The team defeated the British School Manila once which Santos considers as a milestone moment with Bahay Bata. The Santos family and friends later established the Makati Mavericks Rugby Club.

Santos played rugby for ISM during his high school years. Outside of ISM, he also played for the New Zealand-based North Harbour Rugby Union in the Manila 10s. He was also part of his family's Makati Mavericks playing in domestic 7s, 10s, and 15s competitions.

=== Harvard ===
Santos attended Harvard College, where he played for the Harvard Rugby Football Club. He was elected vice-captain as a freshman in 2018 and later served as captain, becoming the second player of Filipino descent to captain the club, after Jaime Alfonso Zobel de Ayala. In 2022, he helped Harvard finish as runner-up in the men's D1-AA competition at the Collegiate Rugby Championship, the program's best result at the tournament.

During his collegiate career, Santos was selected to the 2023 National Collegiate Rugby Division I All-American team. He was also a two-time NCR Scholastic All-American and received All-Ivy Sevens and Academic All-Ivy honors.

=== Cambridge ===
While studying for master's at the University of Cambridge, Santos played for Cambridge University R.U.F.C. during the 2024–25 season. He helped the team compile a 9–2 record, including its first victory over Trinity College Dublin in six years, and earned a rugby Blue.

In March 2025, Santos started on the wing in the Varsity Match against Oxford University. He scored a try as Cambridge recovered from a 21–6 deficit to win 35–28, completing the largest comeback in the history of the fixture. His appearance made him the first player from the Philippines to compete in the Varsity Match since it was first played in 1872.

=== National team ===
Santos represented the Philippines at age-grade level, playing within the national youth program at the under-14, under-16, under-18 and under-19 levels.

In 2021, he represented the United States at under-23 level. He was subsequently selected for the United States men's national rugby sevens team in May 2023.
