= 2024–25 SVNS =

Series of national rugby sevens tournaments

- Men's Series XXVI; Women's Series XII
- Hosts: United Arab Emirates; South Africa; Australia; Canada; Hong Kong; Singapore; United States (Grand Final)
- Date: 30 November 2024 – 4 May 2025
- Nations: 12

Team changes
- Relegated: Men; Kenya; Uruguay; Ireland; United States; Women; Brazil; China; Ireland; Spain

Series details
- Top try scorer: Men; Joji Nasova (26); Marcos Moneta (26); Women; Maddison Levi (54)
- Top point scorer: Men; Joji Nasova (158); Women; Maddison Levi (270)

The 2024–25 SVNS was the 26th annual series of rugby sevens tournaments for national sevens teams, known as the SVNS. It took place between November 2024 and June 2025. The SVNS has been run by World Rugby since 1999.

== Teams and format ==
There were three changes from the 2023–24 season, Kenya and Uruguay men won promotion at the 2024 Grand Finals in Madrid, which also saw China women promoted. Canada and Samoa men as well as South Africa women were relegated.

The tournament takes place over seven months and consists of seven events, with the final event holding the top eight-placed teams in a Grand Final event. The teams placed between nine–twelve will compete in a promotion/relegation-style event with other teams to decide which stay as core teams.

=== Men's teams ===
- Argentina
- Australia
- Fiji
- France
- Great Britain
- Ireland
- Kenya
- New Zealand
- South Africa
- Spain
- United States
- Uruguay

=== Women's teams ===
- Australia
- Brazil
- Canada
- China
- Fiji
- France
- Great Britain
- Ireland
- Japan
- New Zealand
- Spain
- United States

== Tour venues ==
The schedule for the series was finalized on November 11, including the Grand Final in Los Angeles as the final leg.

2024–25 itinerary
| Leg | Stadium | City | Dates | Men's Winner | Women's Winner |
|---|---|---|---|---|---|
| Dubai | The Sevens Stadium | Dubai | 30 November–1 December 2024 | Fiji | Australia |
| South Africa | DHL Stadium | Cape Town | 7–8 December 2024 | South Africa | New Zealand |
| Australia | HBF Park | Perth | 24–26 January 2025 | Argentina | Australia |
| Canada | BC Place | Vancouver | 21–23 February 2025 | Argentina | New Zealand |
| Hong Kong | Kai Tak Sports Park | Hong Kong | 28–30 March 2025 | Argentina | New Zealand |
| Singapore | National Stadium | Singapore | 5–6 April 2025 | Fiji | New Zealand |
| United States | Dignity Health Sports Park | Los Angeles | 3–4 May 2025 | South Africa | New Zealand |

== Standings ==
The points awarded to teams at each event, as well as the overall season totals, are shown in the table below. Gold indicates the event champions. Silver indicates the event runner-ups. Bronze indicates the event third place finishers. An asterisk (*) indicates a tied placing. A dash (—) is recorded where a team did not compete. The delineation between position eight and position nine denotes the teams (1st–8th) that will compete in the grand final in Los Angeles, and the teams (9th–12th) that will compete in the Challenger Series.

=== Men's ===
2024–25 SVNS – Men's Series XXVI
| Pos. | Event Team | Dubai | Cape Town | Perth | Vancouver | Hong Kong | Singapore | Points total |
|---|---|---|---|---|---|---|---|---|
| 1 | Argentina | 16 | 12 | 20 | 20 | 20 | 16 | 104 |
| 2 | Fiji | 20 | 16 | 12 | 14 | 14 | 20 | 96 |
| 3 | Spain | 18 | 14 | 16 | 16 | 10 | 14 | 88 |
| 4 | South Africa | 10 | 20 | 14 | 18 | 4 | 4 | 70 |
| 5 | France | 12 | 18 | 10 | 6 | 18 | 1 | 65 |
| 6 | Australia | 8 | 4 | 18 | 8 | 16 | 3 | 57 |
| 7 | New Zealand | 14 | 10 | 4 | 10 | 12 | 6 | 56 |
| 8 | Great Britain | 6 | 6 | 8 | 12 | 6 | 12 | 50 |
| 9 | Kenya | 3 | 8 | 3 | 1 | 3 | 18 | 36 |
| 10 | Uruguay | 4 | 2 | 6 | 3 | 2 | 10 | 27 |
| 11 | Ireland | 2 | 1 | 2 | 2 | 8 | 8 | 23 |
| 12 | United States | 1 | 3 | 1 | 4 | 1 | 2 | 12 |

Legend
| No colour | Core team and re-qualified as a core team for the 2025–26 World Sevens Series |
| Pink | Relegated from core team status for 2025–26 for being one of the 4 lowest place teams. |

=== Women's ===
2024–25 SVNS – Women's Series XII
| Pos. | Event Team | Dubai | Cape Town | Perth | Vancouver | Hong Kong | Singapore | Points total |
|---|---|---|---|---|---|---|---|---|
| 1 | New Zealand | 18 | 20 | 18 | 20 | 20 | 20 | 116 |
| 2 | Australia | 20 | 14 | 20 | 16 | 18 | 18 | 106 |
| 3 | France | 16 | 16 | 16 | 4 | 14 | 14 | 80 |
| 4 | Canada | 6 | 12 | 14 | 8 | 16 | 16 | 72 |
| 5 | Japan | 8 | 10 | 12 | 14 | 8 | 12 | 64 |
| 6 | United States | 12 | 18 | 10 | 6 | 10 | 2 | 58 |
| 7 | Fiji | 1 | 3 | 4 | 18 | 12 | 8 | 46 |
| 8 | Great Britain | 14 | 8 | 3 | 10 | 2 | 6 | 43 |
| 9 | Brazil | 4 | 2 | 8 | 12 | 6 | 1 | 33 |
| 10 | China | 3 | 4 | 6 | 3 | 4 | 10 | 30 |
| 11 | Ireland | 10 | 6 | 1 | 1 | 1 | 3 | 22 |
| 12 | Spain | 2 | 1 | 2 | 2 | 3 | 4 | 14 |

Legend
| No colour | Core team and re-qualified as a core team for the 2025–26 Woman's World Sevens Series |
| Pink | Relegated from core team status for 2025–26 for being one of the 4 lowest place teams. |

=== Men's Grand Finals ===
2024–25 SVNS – Men's Series XXVI
| Pos. | Event Team | Los Angeles |
|---|---|---|
| 1st place, gold medalist(s) | South Africa | |
| 2nd place, silver medalist(s) | Spain | |
| 3rd place, bronze medalist(s) | New Zealand | |
| 4 | Argentina | |
| 5 | France | |
| 6 | Great Britain | |
| 7 | Fiji | |
| 8 | Australia | |

=== Women's Grand Finals ===
2024–25 SVNS – Women's Series XII
| Pos. | Event Team | Los Angeles |
|---|---|---|
| 1st place, gold medalist(s) | New Zealand | |
| 2nd place, silver medalist(s) | Australia | |
| 3rd place, bronze medalist(s) | Canada | |
| 4 | United States | |
| 5 | Fiji | |
| 6 | Japan | |
| 7 | France | |
| 8 | Great Britain | |

== Placings summary ==
Tallies of top-four placings in tournaments during the 2024–25 series, by team:

=== Men ===
| Team | (gold) Gold | (silver) Silver | (bronze) Bronze | Fourth | Total |
|---|---|---|---|---|---|
| Argentina | 3 | — | 2 | 1 | 6 |
| South Africa | 2 | 1 | — | 1 | 4 |
| Fiji | 2 | — | 1 | 2 | 5 |
| France | — | 2 | — | — | 2 |
| Spain | — | 2 | 3 | 2 | 7 |
| Australia | — | 1 | 1 | - | 2 |
| Kenya | — | 1 | — | — | 1 |
| New Zealand | — | — | — | 1 | 1 |

=== Women ===
| Team | (gold) Gold | (silver) Silver | (bronze) Bronze | Fourth | Total |
|---|---|---|---|---|---|
| New Zealand | 5 | 2 | — | — | 7 |
| Australia | 2 | 3 | 1 | 1 | 7 |
| United States | — | 1 | — | 1 | 2 |
| Fiji | — | 1 | — | — | 1 |
| France | — | — | 3 | 2 | 5 |
| Canada | — | — | 3 | 1 | 4 |
| Great Britain | — | — | — | 1 | 1 |
| Japan | — | — | — | 1 | 1 |

== Players ==
Player of the final award
| Tour Leg | Men's Winner | Women's Winner | Ref. |
|---|---|---|---|
| Dubai | Filipe Sauturaga | Charlotte Caslick | |
| Cape Town | Shilton van Wyk | Jorja Miller | |
| Perth | Luciano González | Heidi Dennis | |
| Vancouver | Luciano González | Risi Pouri-Lane | |
| Hong Kong | Marcos Moneta | Jorja Miller | |
| Singapore | Vuiviawa Naduvalo | Risi Pouri-Lane | |
| Los Angeles | Selvyn Davids | Jorja Miller | |

=== Awards ===
Rookie of the Year Award
| Men's Winner | Women's Winner | Ref. |
|---|---|---|
| Enahemo Artaud | Nia Toliver | |

Player of the Year Award
| Men's Winner | Women's Winner | Ref. |
|---|---|---|
| Luciano González | Jorja Miller | |

Dream Team
| Men's Dream Team | Women's Dream Team | Ref. |
|---|---|---|
| Harry Glover; Luciano González; Manu Moreno; Marcos Moneta; Joji Nasova; Pol Pla; Paulin Riva | Michaela Brake; Thalia Costa; Marin Kajiki; Maddison Levi; Jorja Miller; Isabella Nasser; Risi Pouri-Lane | |

== Tournaments ==
=== Dubai ===
==== Men ====
| Event | Winner | Score | Finalist |
|---|---|---|---|
| Cup | Fiji | 19–5 | Spain |
| Bronze | Argentina | 14–0 | New Zealand |
| Fifth Place | France | 17–15 | South Africa |
| Seventh Place | Australia | 17–12 | Great Britain |
| Ninth Place | Uruguay | 15–7 | Kenya |
| Eleventh Place | Ireland | 19–12 | United States |

==== Women ====
| Event | Winner | Score | Finalist |
|---|---|---|---|
| Cup | Australia | 28–24 | New Zealand |
| Bronze | France | 15–12 | Great Britain |
| Fifth Place | United States | 17–7 | Ireland |
| Seventh Place | Japan | 24–22 | Canada |
| Ninth Place | Brazil | 24–17 | China |
| Eleventh Place | Spain | 10–0 | Fiji |

=== Cape Town ===
==== Men ====
| Event | Winner | Score | Finalist |
|---|---|---|---|
| Cup | South Africa | 26–14 | France |
| Bronze | Fiji | 47–10 | Spain |
| Fifth Place | Argentina | 17–12 | New Zealand |
| Seventh Place | Kenya | 32–17 | France |
| Ninth Place | Australia | 19–12 | United States |
| Eleventh Place | Uruguay | 12–7 | Ireland |

==== Women ====
| Event | Winner | Score | Finalist |
|---|---|---|---|
| Cup | New Zealand | 26–12 | United States |
| Bronze | France | 17–14 | Australia |
| Fifth Place | Canada | 22–7 | Japan |
| Seventh Place | Great Britain | 24–7 | Ireland |
| Ninth Place | China | 14–12 | Fiji |
| Eleventh Place | Brazil | 26–14 | Spain |

=== Perth ===
==== Men ====
| Event | Winner | Score | Finalist |
|---|---|---|---|
| Cup | Argentina | 41–5 | Australia |
| Bronze | Spain | 14–7 | South Africa |
| Fifth Place | Fiji | 17–5 | France |
| Seventh Place | Great Britain | 33–7 | Uruguay |
| Ninth Place | New Zealand | 19–12 | Kenya |
| Eleventh Place | Ireland | 19–17 | United States |

==== Women ====
| Event | Winner | Score | Finalist |
|---|---|---|---|
| Cup | Australia | 28–26 | New Zealand |
| Bronze | France | 14–7 | Canada |
| Fifth Place | Japan | 29–22 | United States |
| Seventh Place | Brazil | 21–19 | China |
| Ninth Place | Fiji | 26–17 | Great Britain |
| Eleventh Place | Spain | 24–12 | Ireland |

=== Vancouver ===
==== Men ====
| Event | Winner | Score | Finalist |
|---|---|---|---|
| Cup | Argentina | 19-12 | South Africa |
| Bronze | Spain | 22–7 | Fiji |
| Fifth Place | Great Britain | 31-10 | New Zealand |
| Seventh Place | Australia | 15–12 | France |
| Ninth Place | United States | 22-21 | Uruguay |
| Eleventh Place | Ireland | 19–14 | Kenya |

==== Women ====
| Event | Winner | Score | Finalist |
|---|---|---|---|
| Cup | New Zealand | 41-7 | Fiji |
| Bronze | Australia | 26–12 | Japan |
| Fifth Place | Brazil | 19-10 | Great Britain |
| Seventh Place | Canada | 27–10 | United States |
| Ninth Place | France | 26–12 | China |
| Eleventh Place | Spain | 28–5 | Ireland |

=== Hong Kong ===
==== Men ====
| Event | Winner | Score | Finalist |
|---|---|---|---|
| Cup | Argentina | 12-7 | France |
| Bronze | Australia | 22–21 | Fiji |
| Fifth Place | New Zealand | 24-5 | Spain |
| Seventh Place | Ireland | 28–12 | Great Britain |
| Ninth Place | South Africa | 19-17 | Kenya |
| Eleventh Place | Uruguay | 21–14 | United States |

==== Women ====
| Event | Winner | Score | Finalist |
|---|---|---|---|
| Cup | New Zealand | 26-19 | Australia |
| Bronze | Canada | 21–17 | France |
| Fifth Place | Fiji | 19-7 | United States |
| Seventh Place | Japan | 32–14 | Brazil |
| Ninth Place | China | 12-7 | Spain |
| Eleventh Place | Great Britain | 32–5 | Ireland |

=== Singapore ===
==== Men ====
| Event | Winner | Score | Finalist |
|---|---|---|---|
| Cup | Fiji | 21-12 | Kenya |
| Bronze | Argentina | 33–14 | Spain |
| Fifth Place | Uruguay | 29-33 | Great Britain |
| Seventh Place | Ireland | 21–19 | New Zealand |
| Ninth Place | South Africa | 26-7 | Australia |
| Eleventh Place | United States | 17–12 | France |

==== Women ====
| Event | Winner | Score | Finalist |
|---|---|---|---|
| Cup | New Zealand | 31-7 | Australia |
| Bronze | Canada | 21–5 | France |
| Fifth Place | Japan | 26-12 | China |
| Seventh Place | Fiji | 43–14 | Great Britain |
| Ninth Place | Spain | 17-5 | Ireland |
| Eleventh Place | United States | 26–21 | Brazil |

=== Los Angeles ===
==== Men ====
| Event | Winners | Score | Finalists |
|---|---|---|---|
| Championship | South Africa | 19–5 | Spain |
| Bronze | New Zealand | 38–17 | Argentina |
| Fifth Place | France | 33–31 | Great Britain |
| Seventh Place | Fiji | 19–7 | Australia |
| Qualifier Playoffs | United States | 19–12 | Ireland |
| Qualifier Playoffs | Kenya | 24–5 | Canada |
| Qualifier Playoffs | Germany | 31–0 | Samoa |
| Qualifier Playoffs | Uruguay | 26–17 | Portugal |

==== Women ====
| Event | Winners | Score | Finalists |
|---|---|---|---|
| Championship | New Zealand | 31–7 | Australia |
| Bronze | Canada | 27–7 | United States |
| Fifth Place | Fiji | 46–29 | Japan |
| Seventh Place | France | 17–14 | Great Britain |
| Qualifier Playoffs | Kenya | 17–14 | South Africa |
| Qualifier Playoffs | Brazil | 24–10 | Ireland |
| Qualifier Playoffs | Spain | 28–0 | Argentina |
| Qualifier Playoffs | China | 24–14 | Colombia |
