= Timoci Volavola =

Fijian rugby union player

Timoci Volavola is a Fijian rugby union player. He has played in the Fiji rugby sevens side including the 2006 IRB Sevens World Series champions side. He has also played club rugby in Sydney, Australia with Randwick DRUFC.
