= Great Britain women's national rugby sevens team =

Great Britain
- Union: British Olympic Association
- Coach: Giselle Mather
- Captain: Abbie Brown
| Team kit | Change kit |

First international
- Brazil 3–29 Great Britain (6 August 2016; Rio de Janeiro, Brazil)

Largest win
- Great Britain 50–5 Mexico (26 September 2021; Edmonton, Canada)

Largest defeat
- Canada 33–10 Great Britain (8 August 2016, Rio de Janeiro, Brazil); Fiji 28–5 Great Britain (27 November 2021, Dubai, UAE); United States 40–17 Great Britain (4 December 2021, Dubai, UAE)

Great Britain women's national rugby sevens team
Medal record

European Games
| Gold medal – first place | 2023 Kraków–Małopolska | Team |

The Great Britain women's national rugby sevens team is the women's international rugby 7s team that is the representative team of Great Britain. The team played their first competitive match at the 2016 Summer Olympics after England finished in an Olympic qualifying place at the World Rugby Women's Sevens Series.

They qualified for the 2020 Summer Olympics through England winning the 2019 Rugby Europe Women's Sevens Olympic Qualifying Tournament in Kazan. Great Britain finished in fourth place after losing in the bronze medal match to Fiji. They participated at the 2021 Canada Women's Sevens and won the tournament back to back in Vancouver and Edmonton.

== History ==
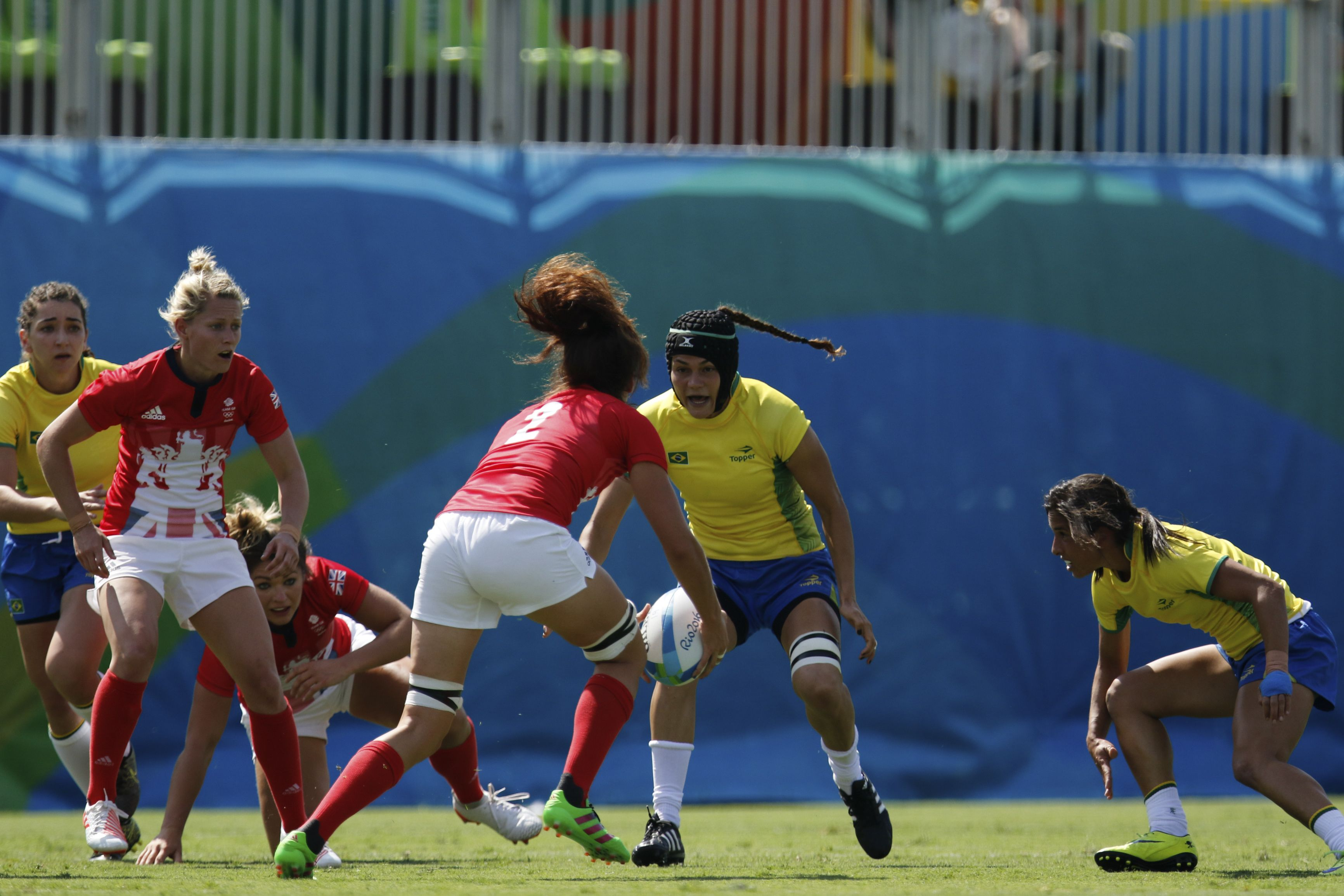
Great Britain vs Brazil at the 2016 Olympics

When rugby sevens was admitted to the Summer Olympics in 2009, it was unknown how Great Britain could qualify. England, Wales and Scotland; three of the four nations that make up the United Kingdom that Great Britain represents at the Olympics, all compete separately within international sevens competition. It was suggested that if any of them finished in an Olympic qualifying spot then Great Britain would qualify through them. However, the International Olympic Committee (IOC) and International Rugby Board (IRB) clarified that Great Britain must select only one nation to be the only one able to obtain qualification as it was viewed that the three individual nations could give Great Britain three chances to qualify compared with other nations only having one. The individual British rugby unions selected England to be the lead nation due to their professional sevens set-up. This also meant that Wales and Scotland could no longer participate in the repecharge competition on behalf of the Sevens Women Grand Prix Series if they qualified due to participation in the repecharge being limited to nations who could qualify for the Olympics. England secured Great Britain's qualification to the 2016 Summer Olympics by finishing fourth in the 2015 World Rugby Women's Sevens Series after defeating the United States in the third place playoff in Amsterdam.

Following qualification for the 2016 Summer Olympics, a new Great Britain Sevens organization was set up called GB Rugby Sevens. Despite England being the nation that qualified Great Britain for the Olympics, it was announced that the Welsh Rugby Union and the Scottish Rugby Union would join the Rugby Football Union for Women in forming the executive board and committee to decide the selection of the team. In May 2015, Joe Lydon was appointed as the performance manager responsible for recruiting the head coach for the Great Britain women's rugby sevens team.

== Eligibility ==
While England was the team that qualified Great Britain for the Olympics, the Great Britain national rugby sevens team is able to select players from Wales and Scotland as well as England in accordance with IOC eligibility rules based on passport ownership. The Rugby Football Union for Women will make recommendations for the team however the British Olympic Association will be the body that makes the final determination for places. Players would be eligible for selection if they had played in the World Rugby Women's Sevens Series, Rugby Europe International Sevens or any other invitational tournament 14 months before the Olympics.

Northern Irish players, according to the IOC's rules as British passport holders, would have been eligible to represent Great Britain. However the Irish Rugby Football Union (IRFU), which governs rugby in Northern Ireland and the Republic of Ireland together, demanded that Northern Irish players only play for the Ireland national rugby sevens team. However, it was stated that Northern Irish players could legally challenge that demand, particularly if Ireland failed to qualify due to differences in World Rugby and IOC qualifying criteria.

== Tournament record ==
=== World Rugby Sevens Series ===
Women's SVNS
| Season | Rds | Pos | Pts |
|---|---|---|---|
| 2021–22 | 2 / 6 | 6th | 15 (Note: At the time of the third event, Great Britain were sixth on the overall women's series standings, sitting above Brazil, Spain, Ireland and Canada.) |
| 2022–23 | 7 | 7th | 68 |
| 2023–24 SVNS | 7 | 8th | 53 |
| 2024–25 SVNS | TBD | | |

=== Summer Olympics ===
Olympic Games record
| Year | Round | Position | Pld | W | L | D |
|---|---|---|---|---|---|---|
| (Brazil) 2016 | Third-place playoff | 4th | 6 | 4 | 2 | 0 |
| (Japan) 2020 | Third-place playoff | 4th | 6 | 3 | 3 | 0 |
| (France) 2024 | Seventh-place playoff | 7th | 6 | 3 | 3 | 0 |
| Total | 0 Titles | 3/3 | 18 | 10 | 8 | 0 |

== Squad ==
=== Sevens Series squad ===
2023–24 Series
| Pos. | Player | Date of birth (age) | Matches | Points | Union |
|---|---|---|---|---|---|
| | Rhona Lloyd | 17 October 1996 (age 30) | 89 | 295 | Stade Bordelais |
| BK | Jasmine Joyce | 9 October 1995 (age 31) | 114 | 410 | Bristol Bears |
| BK | Shona Campbell | 7 June 2001 (age 25) | 71 | 45 | Edinburgh University |
| BK | Abbie Brown | 10 April 1996 (age 30) | 211 | 329 | Bristol Bears |
| | Isla Norman-Bell | 21 February 2000 (age 26) | 69 | 150 | |
| BK | Heather Cowell | 23 January 1996 (age 30) | 87 | 163 | Harlequins |
| | Lauren Torley | 2 September 1999 (age 27) | 35 | 5 | |
| BK | Grace Crompton | 30 October 2001 (age 25) | 69 | 185 | Bristol Bears |
| BK | Emma Uren | 1 October 1997 (age 29) | 136 | 279 | Saracens |
| BK | Amy Wilson-Hardy | 13 September 1991 (age 35) | 243 | 370 | Wasps |
| FW | Lisa Thomson | 7 July 1997 (age 29) | 128 | 121 | Melrose |
| BK | Ellie Boatman | 13 May 1997 (age 29) | 58 | 145 | Wasps |
| | Jade Shekells | 28 September 1996 (age 30) | 61 | 40 | |
