= USA Women's Sevens =

Rugby sevens tournament

On October 4, 2012, the International Rugby Board, now known as World Rugby, announced the launch of a circuit now known as the World Rugby Women's Sevens Series, the women's counterpart to the World Rugby Sevens Series for men. The inaugural 2012–13 season featured four events, with the USA Women's Sevens taking place at BBVA Compass Stadium in Houston as the second event in February 2013.

The following are details of all official regional women's international championship played in the USA since the first tournament in 2006, listed chronologically with the earliest first, with all result details, where known.

== Rugby sevens background ==
Rugby sevens - a short form of the sport of rugby union - was first played in 1883, with the first (men's) internationals taking place in 1973. As women's rugby union developed in the 1960s and 1970s the format became very popular as it allowed games, and entire leagues, to be developed in countries even when player numbers were small, and it remains the main form the women's game is played in most parts of the world.

However, although the first Women's international rugby union 15-a-side test match took place in 1982, it was not until 1997 before the first Women's International Rugby Union Sevens tournaments were played, when the Hong Kong Sevens included a women's tournament for the first time. Over the next decade the number of tournaments grew, with almost every region developing regular championship. This reached its zenith with 2009's inaugural women's tournament for the Rugby World Cup Sevens, shortly followed by the announcement that women's rugby sevens will be included in the Olympics from 2016.

== Results ==
Summary of results in the United States leg of the World Rugby Women's Sevens series:

Year	Venue	Cup final			Placings		
		Winner	Score	Runner-up	Third	Fourth	Plate
2013	BBVA Compass Stadium, Houston	England	29–12	United States	Australia	New Zealand	Russia
2014	Fifth Third Bank Stadium, Kennesaw	New Zealand	36–0	Canada	Australia	Russia	United States
2015	Fifth Third Bank Stadium, Kennesaw	New Zealand	50–12	United States	Canada	Russia	Australia
		Winner	Score	Runner-up	Third	Fourth	Fifth
2016	Fifth Third Bank Stadium, Kennesaw	Australia	24–19	New Zealand	England	Canada	United States
2017	Sam Boyd Stadium, Whitney	New Zealand	28–5	Australia	Canada	United States	Fiji
2018	Infinity Park, Glendale	New Zealand	33–7	United States	Canada	France	Australia
2019	Infinity Park, Glendale	United States	26–7	Australia	New Zealand	France	Spain
2024	Dignity Health Sports Park, Los Angeles	New Zealand	29–14	Australia	United States	Canada	France

== USA Tournament 2006 ==
Venue: Los Angeles, USA (Source USA Rugby)

- USA 5-0 Canada

Note: Believed to be as an exhibition match. It is also possible that the teams played a second time, before the final of the men's competition.

== USA Tournament 2007 ==
Played at San Diego, USA, on 9 and 10 February 2007 (Source USA Rugby)

Known Participants: USA A, USA B, Canada A, Canada B, China

- China bt Canada A
- Canada B bt China
- USA A bt China
- USA B bt China

Final

- Canada B bt USA A
- China 4th

== USA Sevens 2008 ==
Venue/Date: San Diego, 9–10 February 2008

- Initially Kazakhstan, China, New Zealand and Australia were expected

=== Pool 1 ===
Canada, USA A, Canada Collegiate

=== Pool 2 ===
USA, Canada A, South Africa

- Plus exhibition match USA vs South Africa

Group stages Although in groups of three, four teams played three games whilst the two A teams only played 2 each. The results are presented as one table.

Nation	Won	Drawn	Lost	For	Against
USA	3	0	0	60	7
Canada	3	0	0	74	25
USA A	1	0	1	25	26
Canada A	0	0	2	5	45
South Africa	1	0	2	38	45
Canada Collegiate	0	0	3	5	59

- Canada A 5-21 South Africa
- Canada Collegiate 0-15 USA A
- USA 21-7 South Africa
- Canada 29-5 Canada Collegiate
- USA 24-0 Canada A
- Canada 26-10 USA A
- Canada 19-10 South Africa
- USA 15-0 Canada Collegiate

=== Classification matches ===
5th Place

- Canada Collegiate 10-24 South Africa

3rd Place

- USA A 12-20 Canada A

Final

- USA 19-5 Canada

Exhibition Match

- USA 17-12 South Africa

== USA Sevens 2009 ==
Venue/Date: 9 February 2009. San Diego (alongside the IRB event).

- This tournament is ostensibly a World Cup warm up. There are 7 teams (including USA 2) and rather than playing in groups, each team plays three opponents and they are then all assessed to decide the classification participants.
- The teams (in "seed" order)are England, NZ Maori, Canada, USA, USA 2, China, Japan
- The subsequent classification games place Japan above China but the Chinese results are better against tougher opponents, as is the points for and points difference. Japan also appear to have played four games.

=== Group Games ===
POOL A

Nation	Won	Drawn	Lost	For	Against
England	3	0	0	70	7
NZ Maori	3	0	0	72	24
USA	2	0	1	66	19
Canada	2	0	1	55	32
USA 2	1	0	2	27	37
Japan	0	0	4	5	132
China	0	0	3	17	61

- England 36-0 Japan
- Canada 17-5 USA 2
- USA 21-0 China
- NZ Maori 36-0 Japan
- England 15-7 USA 2
- Canada 26-5 China
- USA 45-0 Japan
- NZ Maori 22-12 Canada
- USA 2 15-5 Japan
- England 19-0 USA
- NZ Maori 14-12 China

=== Classification Games ===
5th 6th Play-off

- USA 2 17-7 Japan

Semi Final 1st vs 4th

- England 29-0 Canada

Semi Final 2nd vs 3rd

- USA 12-0 New Zealand

Final

- England 17-12 USA (sudden death, 12-12 at full time)

== USA Sevens 2010 ==
Venue/Date: 12 February 2009. Whitney, Nevada (alongside the IRB event).

POOL A

Nation	Won	Drawn	Lost	For	Against
USA White	3	0	0	65	31
China	2	0	1	72	38
France	2	0	1	58	26
Canada University	2	0	1	38	27
Germany	0	0	3	31	82
USA Blue	0	0	3	22	82

- USA White 19-12 China
- France 29-12 USA Blue
- USA White 29-12 Germany
- Canada University 14-0 France
- China 24-19 Germany
- Canada University 17-10 USA Blue
- USA White 17-7 Canada University
- France 29-0 Germany
- China 36-0 USA Blue

=== 5th/6th place ===
- USA Blue 38-12 Germany

=== Semi-finals ===
- Semifinal: USA White 17-7 Canada National University
- Semifinal: China 26-14 France

=== 3rd/4th place ===
- Canada University 31-0 France

=== Final ===
- USA White 0-10 China

== USA Sevens 2011 ==
Date/Venue: February 11–13, 2011. Whitney, Nevada

- Australia, Brazil and Kenya were originally expected, and Kenya only withdrew a week before due to visa problems, being replaced by the Hawaiian Select. Tyrolian Select - from the Women Rugby Club, Innsburck - had originally intended to take part in the club event. The final was broadcast on NBC in North America.

POOL A

Nation	Won	Drawn	Lost	For	Against
Netherlands	2	0	1	120	27
Canada	2	0	1	83	19
USA	2	0	1	65	26
Tyrolian Select	0	0	3	0	198

- USA 43-0 Tyrolian Select
- Canada 12-10 Netherlands
- USA 15-21 Netherlands
- Canada 66-0 Tyrolian Select
- USA 7-5 Canada
- Netherlands 89-0 Tyrolian Select

5th to 8th Place

- USA 17-5 Hawaii Select
- Maple Leafs 52-0 Tyrolian Select

7th Place

- Hawaii Select 34-0 Tyrolian Select

5th Place

- USA 26-7 Maple Leafs

POOL B

Nation	Won	Drawn	Lost	For	Against
Spain	3	0	0	60	19
France	2	0	1	69	21
Maple Leafs	1	0	2	38	41
Hawaii Select	0	0	3	7	88

- France 21-7 Maple Leafs
- Spain 26-7 Hawaii Select
- France 36-0 Hawaii Select
- Spain 20-5 Maple Leafs
- France 12-14 Spain
- Hawaii Select 0-26 Maple Leafs

Semi Finals

- Spain 0-15 Canada
- Netherlands 17-7 France

3rd Place

- Spain 12-15 France

Final

- Canada 17-12 Netherlands

== USA Sevens 2012 ==
- Chile and "Adler Sevens" (German development team) also took part in the Women's Elite Sevens. Adler beat Chile 22-5 on the way to winning the tournament.

Date/Venue: February 10–12, 2012. Whitney, Nevada

POOL A

Nation	Won	Drawn	Lost	For	Against
Canada	3	0	0	80	7
Netherlands	2	0	1	48	33
Stars & Stripes	1	0	2	48	43
Brazil	0	0	3	5	97

- Netherlands 12-5 Stars & Stripes
- Canada 26-0 Brazil
- Netherlands 36-0 Brazil
- Canada 26-7 Stars & Stripes
- Brazil 5-36 Stars & Stripes
- Canada 28-0 Netherlands

5th to 8th Place

- Maple Leafs 5-12 Brazil
- Stars & Stripes 14-5 Japan

7th Place

- Maple Leafs 27-14 Japan

5th Place

- Brazil 21-19 Stars & Stripes

POOL B

Nation	Won	Drawn	Lost	For	Against
USA	3	0	0	58	24
France	2	0	1	45	34
Maple Leafs	1	0	2	34	31
Japan	0	0	3	5	58

- France 14-5 Maple Leafs
- USA 17-5 Japan
- France 19-0 Japan
- USA 22-7 Maple Leafs
- Japan 0-22 Maple Leafs
- USA 19-12 France

Semi Finals

- Canada 21-12 France
- USA 17-5 Netherlands

3rd Place

- Netherlands 12-17 France

Final

- USA 5-14 Canada

== Women's Sevens World Series (USA) ==
- Venue: Houston 1–2 February 2013

Group A

Nation	Won	Drawn	Lost	For	Against
England	3	0	0	72	12
New Zealand	2	0	1	90	19
Netherlands	1	0	2	59	57
Trinidad and Tobago	0	0	3	5	136

- New Zealand 50-0 Trinidad and Tobago
- England 17-7 Netherlands
- Netherlands 14-35 New Zealand
- England 48-0 Trinidad and Tobago
- Netherlands 38-5 Trinidad and Tobago
- England 7-5 New Zealand

Group B

Nation	Won	Drawn	Lost	For	Against
United States	2	1	0	75	31
Canada	2	1	0	67	26
South Africa	1	0	1	60	46
Argentina	0	0	2	0	99

- Argentina 0-27 South Africa
- Canada 12-12 United States
- South Africa 19-22 United States
- Argentina 0-31 Canada
- Argentina 0-41 United States
- Canada 24-14 South Africa

Plate Semi Finals (5th-8th)

- Netherlands 19-5 Canada
- Russia 20-0 South Africa

7th/8th Match

- Canada 33-0 South Africa

Plate final: 5th/6th Match

- Netherlands 10-29 Russia

Group C

Nation	Won	Drawn	Lost	For	Against
Australia	3	0	0	68	22
Russia	2	0	1	61	20
Japan	1	0	2	34	67
Brazil	0	0	3	12	66

- Australia 31-12 Japan
- Russia 27-0 Brazil
- Australia 22-0 Brazil
- Russia 24-5 Japan
- Brazil 12-17 Japan
- Australia 15-10 Russia

Bowl Semi Finals (9th-12th)

- Japan 12-7 Trinidad
- Brazil 25-5 Argentina

11th/12th Match

- Trinidad 5-25 Argentina

Bowl final:9th/10th Match

- Japan 7-12 Brazil

Quarter-finals (1st-8th)

- England 19-14 Netherlands
- USA 15-7 Russia
- Canada 10-12 New Zealand
- Australia 17-12 South Africa (AET)

Cup Semi Finals (1st-4th)

- England 19-12 New Zealand
- United States 17-5 Australia

3rd/4th place

- New Zealand 12-17 Australia

Cup Final: 1st/2nd place

- England 29-12 United States

== USA Sevens 2013 ==
- Venue: Sam Boyd Stadium, Whitney, Nevada 8–9 February 2013

Pool A

Nation	Won	Drawn	Lost	For	Against
Maple Leafs Black	3	0	0	71	0
USA Stars	2	0	1	50	17
Argentina	1	0	2	14	76
Laia Parkside	0	0	3	0	42

- USA Stars 36-0 Argentina
- Maple Leafs Black 14-0 Laia Parkside
- USA Stars 14-0 Laia Parkside
- Maple Leafs Black 40-0 Argentina
- USA Stars 0-17 Maple Leafs Black
- Argentina 14-0 Laia Parkside

Pool B

Nation	Won	Drawn	Lost	For	Against
Maple Leafs Red	3	0	0	122	5
Emperor's Atlantis	2	0	1	42	43
Beavers International Elite	1	0	2	19	55
Trinidad and Tobago	0	0	3	12	96

- Maple Leafs Red 38-0 Beavers International Elite
- Trinidad & Tobago 7-25 Emperor's Atlantis
- Maple Leafs Red 29-5 Emperor's Atlantis
- Trinidad & Tobago 5-12 Beavers International Elite
- Maple Leafs Red 55-0 Trinidad & Tobago
- Emperor's Atlantis 12-7 Beavers International Elite

Plate Semi Finals (5th-8th)

7th/8th Match

Plate final: 5th/6th Match

Group C

Nation	Won	Drawn	Lost	For	Against
USA Stripes	3	0	0	88	14
Japan	2	0	1	62	40
Dog River Howlers	1	0	2	19	55
Combined Services	0	0	3	7	67

- Japan 29-0 Combined Services
- USA Stripes 29-0 Dog River Howlers
- Japan 19-7 Dog River Howlers
- USA Stripes 26-0 Combined Services
- Japan 14-33 USA Stripes
- Combined Services 7-12 Dog River Howlers

Bowl Semi Finals (9th-12th)

- Combined Services v Laia Parkside
- Argentina v Trinidad & Tobago

11th/12th Match

Bowl final:9th/10th Match

Quarter-finals (1st-8th)

- Maple Leafs Red bt Dog River Howlers
- USA Stars lost to Japan
- USA Stripes v Beavers International
- Maple Leafs Black bt Emperors Atlantis

Cup Semi Finals (1st-4th)

- Maple Leafs Red bt Japan
- USA Stripes lost to Maple Leafs Black

3rd/4th place

- Japan v USA Stripes

Cup Final: 1st/2nd place

- Maple Leafs Red 19-0 Maple Leafs Black

== Women's Sevens World Series (USA) 2014 ==
- Venue: Fifth Third Bank Stadium, Kennesaw, Georgia, 15–16 February 2014

Group A

Nation	Won	Drawn	Lost	For	Against
Canada	3	0	0	100	7
Australia	2	0	1	55	12
United States	1	0	2	41	48
China	0	0	3	0	119

- Australia 31-0 China
- Canada 31-0 United States
- Australia 17-0 United States
- Canada 47-0 China
- United States 41-0 China
- Australia 7-12 Canada

Group B

Nation	Won	Drawn	Lost	For	Against
New Zealand	3	0	0	71	12
England	2	0	1	46	36
Ireland	1	0	2	19	68
Netherlands	0	0	3	22	52

- New Zealand 21-0 Netherlands
- England 22-0 Ireland
- New Zealand 36-7 Ireland
- England 19-12 Netherlands
- Ireland 12-10 Netherlands
- New Zealand 14-5 England

Plate Semi Finals (5th-8th)

- United States 19-5 England
- Spain 24-0 Japan

7th/8th Match

- England 19-12 Japan

Plate final: 5th/6th Match

- United States 22-0 Spain

Group C

Nation	Won	Drawn	Lost	For	Against
Russia	3	0	0	100	19
Japan	2	0	1	33	43
Spain	1	0	2	40	36
Brazil	0	0	3	17	82

- Russia 29-0 Japan
- Spain 19-5 Brazil
- Russia 42-5 Brazil
- Spain 7-12 Japan
- Brazil 7-21 Japan
- Russia 19-14 Spain

Bowl Semi Finals (9th-12th)

- Ireland 7-26 China
- Netherlands 17-10 Brazil

11th/12th Match

- Ireland 5-20 Brazil

Bowl final:9th/10th Match

- China 0-33 Netherlands

Quarter-finals (1st-8th)

- Canada 26-12 USA
- Australia 17-12 (AET) England
- Russia 29-0 Spain
- New Zealand 42-0 Japan

Cup Semi Finals (1st-4th)

- Canada 17-7 Australia
- Russia 7-24 New Zealand

3rd/4th place

- Australia 22-12 Russia

Cup Final: 1st/2nd place

- Canada 0-36 New Zealand

== Women's Sevens World Series (USA) 2015 ==
- Venue: Fifth Third Bank Stadium, Kennesaw, Georgia 14–15 February 2015

Group A

Nation	Won	Drawn	Lost	For	Against
New Zealand	3	0	0	126	12
United States	2	0	1	55	74
Russia	0	0	2	67	36
South Africa	0	0	2	5	131

- New Zealand 17-12 Russia
- United States 36-5 South Africa
- New Zealand 52-0 South Africa
- United States 19-12 Russia
- New Zealand 57-0 United States
- Russia 43-0 South Africa

Group C

Nation	Won	Drawn	Lost	For	Against
England	3	0	0	83	17
Canada	2	0	1	69	40
Brazil	1	0	2	17	59
China	0	0	3	28	81

- Canada 28-0 Brazil
- England 33-7 China
- Canada 31-14 China
- England 24-0 Brazil
- Canada 10-26 England
- Brazil 17-7 China

Plate Semi Finals (5th-8th)

- Brazil 0-43 France
- Australia 24-12 England

7th/8th Match

- Brazil 10-31 England

Plate final: 5th/6th Match

- France 17-26 Australia

Group B

Nation	Won	Drawn	Lost	For	Against
Australia	3	0	0	79	14
France	2	0	1	55	29
Spain	1	0	2	26	74
Fiji	0	0	3	24	67

- Australia 36-0 Fiji
- France 36-0 Spain
- Australia 24-7 Spain
- France 12-10 Fiji
- Australia 19-7 France
- Fiji 14-19 Spain

Bowl Semi Finals (9th-12th)

- Spain 24-0 South Africa
- Fiji 24-0 China

11th/12th Match

- South Africa 7-26 China

Bowl final:9th/10th Match

- Spain - Fiji

Quarter-finals (1st-8th)

- New Zealand 36-0 Brazil
- Canada 24-12 France
- Australia 5-10 United States
- England 0-24 Russia

Cup Semi Finals (1st-4th)

- New Zealand 24-22 Canada
- United States 19-14 Russia

3rd/4th place

- Canada 28-17 Russia

Cup Final: 1st/2nd place

- New Zealand 50-12 United States

== World Rugby Women's Sevens Series (USA) 2018 ==
USA Rugby did not host an event in the 2017–18 World Rugby Women's Sevens Series, although it hosted the corresponding event in that season's men's Sevens Series. It chose to focus its resources on hosting the 2018 Rugby World Cup Sevens for both sexes in San Francisco.

The USA Women's Sevens returned for the 2018–19 series, but it moved from March to October, becoming the season opener. Also, the tournament moved to a new site—Infinity Park in the Denver suburb of Glendale, Colorado.

== See also ==
- USA Sevens
