= 2014 Netherlands Women's Sevens =

- Women's Sevens Series II
- Host nation: Netherlands
- Date: 16–17 May 2014

Cup
- Champion: New Zealand
- Runner-up: Australia
- Third: Canada

Plate
- Winner: United States
- Runner-up: Russia

Bowl
- Winner: Netherlands
- Runner-up: South Africa

Tournament details
- Matches played: 34

The 2014 Netherlands Women's Sevens was the second edition of the Netherlands Women's Sevens tournament, and the fifth of five tournaments in the 2013–14 season. It took place on 16 and 17 May 2014 at NRCA Stadium, Amsterdam.

== Format ==
The teams were drawn into three pools of four teams each. Each team played everyone in their pool one time. The top two teams from each pool advanced to the Cup/Plate brackets while the top 2 third place teams will also compete in the Cup/Plate. The rest of the teams from each group went to the Bowl brackets.

== Teams ==
A total of twelve teams will compete: The nine "core" teams, and three invited teams.

Core Teams

Invited Teams

- Australia
- Canada
- England
- Ireland
- New Zealand
- Russia
- Spain
- United States
- Brazil
- Netherlands
- France
- South Africa

== Pool Stage ==
Key to colours in group tables
Teams that advance to the Cup Quarterfinal

=== Pool A ===
Team	Pld	W	D	L	PF	PA	PD	Pts
New Zealand	3	3	0	0	90	19	71	9
United States	3	2	1	0	75	43	32	7
Spain	3	1	2	0	24	72	-48	5
Ireland	3	0	0	3	21	76	-55	3

=== Pool B ===
Team	Pld	W	D	L	PF	PA	PD	Pts
Australia	3	3	0	0	89	17	72	9
France	3	2	0	1	41	31	10	7
Russia	3	1	0	2	32	51	-19	5
South Africa	3	0	0	3	12	75	-63	3

=== Pool C ===
Team	Pld	W	D	L	PF	PA	PD	Pts
England	3	3	0	0	65	15	40	9
Canada	3	2	0	1	54	15	39	7
Brazil	3	1	0	2	10	47	-37	5
Netherlands	3	0	0	3	10	62	-52	3

== Knockout stage ==
=== Bowl ===
Semi-finals
17 May - - NRCA Stadium, Amsterdam
Spain	12
South Africa	28
17 May - - NRCA Stadium, Amsterdam
Netherlands	24
Ireland	0

Final
17 May - - NRCA Stadium, Amsterdam
South Africa	7
Netherlands	29
11th Place
17 May - - NRCA Stadium, Amsterdam
Spain	5
Ireland	7

=== Plate ===
Semi-finals
17 May - - NRCA Stadium, Amsterdam
Brazil	0
United States	34
17 May - - NRCA Stadium, Amsterdam
France	0
Russia	24

Final
17 May - - NRCA Stadium, Amsterdam
United States	27
Russia	12
7th Place
17 May - - NRCA Stadium, Amsterdam
Brazil	5
France	14

=== Cup ===
Quarter-finals
17 May - - NRCA Stadium, Amsterdam
Australia	33
Brazil	0
17 May - - NRCA Stadium, Amsterdam
Canada	28
United States	19
17 May - - NRCA Stadium, Amsterdam
England	7
France	0
17 May - - NRCA Stadium, Amsterdam
New Zealand	36
Russia	0

Semi-finals
17 May - - NRCA Stadium, Amsterdam
Australia	17
Canada	0
17 May - - NRCA Stadium, Amsterdam
England	10
New Zealand	26

Final
17 May - - NRCA Stadium, Amsterdam
Australia	12
New Zealand	29
Third place
17 May - - NRCA Stadium, Amsterdam
Canada	10
England	0
