= 2016 USA Women's Sevens =

- Women's Sevens Series IV
- Host nation: United States of America
- Date: 8 – 9 April 2016

Cup
- Champion: Australia
- Runner-up: New Zealand
- Third: England

Plate
- Winner: United States
- Runner-up: Russia

Bowl
- Winner: Ireland
- Runner-up: Japan

Tournament details
- Matches played: 34

The 2016 USA Sevens was the third tournament within the 2015–16 World Rugby Women's Sevens Series. It was held over the weekend of 8–9 April 2016 at Fifth Third Bank Stadium in the Atlanta suburb of Kennesaw, Georgia. Australia won the tournament, defeating New Zealand by 24–19 in the final.

== Format ==
The teams were drawn into three pools of four teams each. Each team played everyone in their pool one time. The top two teams from each pool advanced to the Cup/Plate brackets while the top 2 third place teams will also compete in the Cup/Plate. The rest of the teams from each group went to the Bowl brackets.

== Teams ==
- Australia
- Canada
- Colombia
- England
- Fiji
- France
- Ireland
- Japan
- New Zealand
- Russia
- Spain
- United States

== Pool Stage ==
Key to colours in group tables
Teams that advance to the Cup Quarterfinal

=== Pool A ===
Team	Pld	W	D	L	PF	PA	PD	Pts
England	3	3	0	0	94	14	+80	9
Australia	3	2	0	1	63	26	+37	7
Fiji	3	1	0	2	53	57	-4	5
Colombia	3	0	0	3	7	120	-113	3

8 April 2016
13:14

Australia	7–21	England

Fifth Third Bank Stadium, Atlanta

8 April 2016
13:36

Fiji	41–7	Colombia

Fifth Third Bank Stadium, Atlanta

8 April 2016
15:58

Australia	34–0	Colombia

Fifth Third Bank Stadium, Atlanta

8 April 2016
16:20

Fiji	7–28	England

Fifth Third Bank Stadium, Atlanta

8 April 2016
18:42

Australia	22–5	Fiji

Fifth Third Bank Stadium, Atlanta

8 April 2016
19:04

England	45–0	Colombia

Fifth Third Bank Stadium, Atlanta

=== Pool B ===
Team	Pld	W	D	L	PF	PA	PD	Pts
Canada	3	3	0	0	72	22	+50	9
France	3	2	0	1	56	24	+32	7
Russia	3	1	0	2	22	55	-33	5
Ireland	3	0	0	3	12	61	-49	3

8 April 2016
12:30

Canada	26–5	Russia

Fifth Third Bank Stadium, Atlanta

8 April 2016
12:52

France	22–0	Ireland

Fifth Third Bank Stadium, Atlanta

8 April 2016
15:14

Canada	29–5	Ireland

Fifth Third Bank Stadium, Atlanta

8 April 2016
15:36

France	22–7	Russia

Fifth Third Bank Stadium, Atlanta

8 April 2016
17:58

Canada	17–12	France

Fifth Third Bank Stadium, Atlanta

8 April 2016
18:20

Russia	10–7	Ireland

Fifth Third Bank Stadium, Atlanta

=== Pool C ===
Team	Pld	W	D	L	PF	PA	PD	Pts
United States	3	3	0	0	69	17	+52	9
New Zealand	3	2	0	1	53	22	+31	7
Japan	3	1	0	2	32	78	-46	5
Spain	3	0	0	3	12	49	-37	3

8 April 2016
13:58

New Zealand	38–5	Japan

Fifth Third Bank Stadium, Atlanta

8 April 2016
14:20

United States	24–0	Spain

Fifth Third Bank Stadium, Atlanta

8 April 2016
16:42

New Zealand	10–5	Spain

Fifth Third Bank Stadium, Atlanta

8 April 2016
17:04

United States	33–12	Japan

Fifth Third Bank Stadium, Atlanta

8 April 2016
19:26

New Zealand	5–12	United States

Fifth Third Bank Stadium, Atlanta

8 April 2016
19:48

Japan	15–7	Spain

Fifth Third Bank Stadium, Atlanta

== Knockout stage ==
=== Bowl ===
Semi-finals
9 April 2016 – Atlanta
Japan	19
Colombia	7
9 April 2016 – Atlanta
Spain	5
Ireland	17

Final
9 April 2016 – Atlanta
Japan	15
Ireland	26
Third place
9 April 2016 – Atlanta
Colombia	12
Spain	24

=== Plate ===
Quarter-finals
9 April 2016 – Atlanta
England	19
Russia	12
9 April 2016 – Atlanta
France	7
New Zealand	24
9 April 2016 – Atlanta
Canada	29
Fiji	0
9 April 2016 – Atlanta
United States	5
Australia	22

Semi-finals
9 April 2016 – Atlanta
Russia	24
France	12
9 April 2016 – Atlanta
Fiji	0
United States	38

Final
9 April 2016 – Atlanta
Russia	7
United States	19
Third place
9 April 2016 – Atlanta
France	28
Fiji	0

=== Cup ===
Quarter-finals
9 April 2016 – Atlanta
England	19
Russia	12
9 April 2016 – Atlanta
France	7
New Zealand	24
9 April 2016 – Atlanta
Canada	29
Fiji	0
9 April 2016 – Atlanta
United States	5
Australia	22

Semi-finals
9 April 2016 – Atlanta
England	19
New Zealand	24
9 April 2016 – Atlanta
Canada	14
Australia	26

Final
9 April 2016 – Atlanta
New Zealand	19
Australia	24
Third place
9 April 2016 – Atlanta
England	26
Canada	14
