= 2015 USA Women's Sevens =

- Women's Sevens Series III
- Host nation: United States of America
- Date: 14 – 15 March 2015

Cup
- Champion: New Zealand
- Runner-up: United States
- Third: Canada

Plate
- Winner: Australia
- Runner-up: France

Bowl
- Winner: Fiji
- Runner-up: Spain

Tournament details
- Matches played: 34
- Most points: (New Zealand) Portia Woodman (70)

The 2015 USA Sevens was the third tournament within the 2014–15 Sevens World Series. It was held over the weekend of 14 – 15 March 2015 at Fifth Third Bank Stadium in the Atlanta suburb of Kennesaw, Georgia.

== Format ==
The teams were drawn into three pools of four teams each. Each team played everyone in their pool one time. The top two teams from each pool advanced to the Cup/Plate brackets while the top 2 third place teams will also compete in the Cup/Plate. The rest of the teams from each group went to the Bowl brackets.

== Teams ==
- Australia
- Brazil
- Canada
- China
- England
- Fiji
- France
- New Zealand
- Russia
- South Africa
- Spain
- United States

== Pool Stage ==
Key to colours in group tables
Teams that advance to the Cup Quarterfinal

=== Pool A ===
Team	Pld	W	D	L	PF	PA	PD	Pts
New Zealand	3	3	0	0	126	12	+114	9
United States	3	2	0	1	55	74	–19	7
Russia	3	1	0	2	67	36	+31	5
South Africa	3	0	0	3	5	131	–126	3

14 March 2015
13:28

New Zealand	17–12	Russia

Fifth Third Bank Stadium, Atlanta

14 March 2015
13:50

United States	36–5	South Africa

Fifth Third Bank Stadium, Atlanta

14 March 2015
16:12

New Zealand	52–0	South Africa

Fifth Third Bank Stadium, Atlanta

14 March 2015
16:34

United States	19–12	Russia

Fifth Third Bank Stadium, Atlanta

14 March 2015
18:56

New Zealand	57–0	United States

Fifth Third Bank Stadium, Atlanta

14 March 2015
19:18

Russia	43–0	South Africa

Fifth Third Bank Stadium, Atlanta

=== Pool B ===
Team	Pld	W	D	L	PF	PA	PD	Pts
Australia	3	3	0	0	79	14	+65	9
France	3	2	0	1	55	29	+26	7
Spain	3	1	0	2	26	74	–48	5
Fiji	3	0	0	3	24	67	–43	3

14 March 2015
12:00

Australia	36–0	Fiji

Fifth Third Bank Stadium, Atlanta

14 March 2015
12:22

France	36–0	Spain

Fifth Third Bank Stadium, Atlanta

14 March 2015
14:44

Australia	24–7	Spain

Fifth Third Bank Stadium, Atlanta

14 March 2015
15:06

France	12–10	Fiji

Fifth Third Bank Stadium, Atlanta

14 March 2015
17:28

Australia	19–7	France

Fifth Third Bank Stadium, Atlanta

14 March 2015
17:50

Fiji	14–19	Spain

Fifth Third Bank Stadium, Atlanta

=== Pool C ===
Team	Pld	W	D	L	PF	PA	PD	Pts
England	3	3	0	0	83	17	+66	9
Canada	3	2	0	1	69	40	+29	7
Brazil	3	1	0	2	17	59	–42	5
China	3	0	0	3	28	81	–53	3

14 March 2015
12:44

Canada	28–0	Brazil

Fifth Third Bank Stadium, Atlanta

14 March 2015
13:06

England	33–7	China

Fifth Third Bank Stadium, Atlanta

14 March 2015
15:28

Canada	31–14	China

Fifth Third Bank Stadium, Atlanta

14 March 2015
15:50

England	24–0	Brazil

Fifth Third Bank Stadium, Atlanta

14 March 2015
18:12

Canada	10–26	England

Fifth Third Bank Stadium, Atlanta

14 March 2015
18:34

Brazil	17–7	China

Fifth Third Bank Stadium, Atlanta

== Knockout stage ==
=== Bowl ===
Semi-finals
15 March 2015 - 13:28 - Fifth Third Bank Stadium, Atlanta
Spain	24
South Africa	0
15 March 2015 - 13:50 - Fifth Third Bank Stadium, Atlanta
Fiji	24
China	0

Final
15 March 2015 - 17:36 - Fifth Third Bank Stadium, Atlanta
Spain	12
Fiji	17
11th Place
15 March 2015 - 16:34 - Fifth Third Bank Stadium, Atlanta
South Africa	7
China	26

=== Plate ===
Semi-finals
15 March 2015 - 15:06 - Fifth Third Bank Stadium, Atlanta
Brazil	0
France	43
15 March 2015 - 15:28 - Fifth Third Bank Stadium, Atlanta
Australia	24
England	12

Final
15 March 2015 - 18:28 - Fifth Third Bank Stadium, Atlanta
France	17
Australia	26
7th Place
15 March 2015 - 18:06 - Fifth Third Bank Stadium, Atlanta
Brazil	10
England	31

=== Cup ===
Quarter-finals
15 March 2015 - 12:00 - Fifth Third Bank Stadium, Atlanta
New Zealand	36
Brazil	0
15 March 2015 - 12:22 - Fifth Third Bank Stadium, Atlanta
Canada	24
France	12
15 March 2015 - 12:44 - Fifth Third Bank Stadium, Atlanta
Australia	5
United States	10
15 March 2015 - 13:06 - Fifth Third Bank Stadium, Atlanta
England	0
Russia	24

Semi-finals
15 March 2015 - 15:50 - Fifth Third Bank Stadium, Atlanta
New Zealand	24
Canada	22
15 March 2015 - 16:12 - Fifth Third Bank Stadium, Atlanta
United States	19
Russia	14

Final
15 March 2015 - 19:24 - Fifth Third Bank Stadium, Atlanta
New Zealand	50
United States	12
Third place
15 March 2015 - 18:58 - Fifth Third Bank Stadium, Atlanta
Canada	28
Russia	17
