= 2014 USA Women's Sevens =

- Women's Sevens Series II
- Host nation: United States of America
- Date: 15–16 February 2014

Cup
- Champion: New Zealand
- Runner-up: Canada
- Third: Australia

Plate
- Winner: United States
- Runner-up: Spain

Bowl
- Winner: Netherlands
- Runner-up: China

Tournament details
- Matches played: 34

The 2014 USA Sevens was the second tournament within the 2013-14 Sevens World Series. It was held over the weekend of 15–16 February 2014 at Fifth Third Bank Stadium in the Atlanta suburb of Kennesaw, Georgia.

== Format ==
The teams were drawn into three pools of four teams each. Each team played everyone in their pool one time. The top two teams from each pool advanced to the Cup/Plate brackets while the top 2 third place teams will also compete in the Cup/Plate. The rest of the teams from each group went to the Bowl brackets.

== Teams ==
The participating teams and schedule were announced on 15 January 2014.

- Australia
- Brazil
- Canada
- China
- England
- Ireland
- Japan
- New Zealand
- Netherlands
- Russia
- Spain
- United States

== Pool Stage ==
Key to colours in group tables
Teams that advance to the Cup Quarterfinal

=== Pool A ===
Team	Pld	W	D	L	PF	PA	PD	Pts
Canada	3	3	0	0	90	7	83	9
Australia	3	2	0	1	55	12	43	7
United States	3	1	0	2	41	48	−7	5
China	3	0	0	3	0	119	−119	3

15 February 2014
13:44

Australia	31–0	China
	Report

Fifth Third Bank Stadium, Atlanta
Referee: (Spain) Alhambra Nievas

15 February 2014
14:06

Canada	31–0	United States
	Report

Fifth Third Bank Stadium, Atlanta

15 February 2014
16:28

Australia	17–0	United States
	Report

Fifth Third Bank Stadium, Atlanta

15 February 2014
16:50

Canada	47–0	China
	Report

Fifth Third Bank Stadium, Atlanta

15 February 2014
19:12

United States	41–0	China
	Report

Fifth Third Bank Stadium, Atlanta

15 February 2014
19:34

Canada	12–7	Australia
	Report

Fifth Third Bank Stadium, Atlanta

=== Pool B ===
Team	Pld	W	D	L	PF	PA	PD	Pts
New Zealand	3	3	0	0	71	12	59	9
England	3	2	0	1	56	26	30	7
Ireland	3	1	0	2	19	78	−59	5
Netherlands	3	0	0	3	22	52	−30	3

15 February 2014
14:28

New Zealand	21–0	Netherlands
	Report

Fifth Third Bank Stadium, Atlanta

15 February 2014
14:50

England	32–0	Ireland
	Report

Fifth Third Bank Stadium, Atlanta

15 February 2014
17:12

New Zealand	36–7	Ireland
	Report

Fifth Third Bank Stadium, Atlanta

15 February 2014
17:34

England	19–12	Netherlands
	Report

Fifth Third Bank Stadium, Atlanta

15 February 2014
19:56

Ireland	12–10	Netherlands
	Report

Fifth Third Bank Stadium, Atlanta

15 February 2014
20:18

New Zealand	14–5	England
	Report

Fifth Third Bank Stadium, Atlanta

=== Pool C ===
Team	Pld	W	D	L	PF	PA	PD	Pts
Russia	3	3	0	0	90	19	71	9
Japan	3	2	0	1	33	43	−10	7
Spain	3	1	0	2	40	36	4	5
Brazil	3	0	0	3	17	82	−65	3

15 February 2014
13:00

Russia	29–0	Japan
	Report

Fifth Third Bank Stadium, Atlanta

15 February 2014
13:22

Spain	19–5	Brazil
	Report

Fifth Third Bank Stadium, Atlanta

15 February 2014
15:44

Russia	42–5	Brazil
	Report

Fifth Third Bank Stadium, Atlanta

15 February 2014
16:06

Japan	12–7	Spain
	Report

Fifth Third Bank Stadium, Atlanta

15 February 2014
18:28

Japan	21–7	Brazil
	Report

Fifth Third Bank Stadium, Atlanta

15 February 2014
18:50

Russia	19–14	Spain
	Report

Fifth Third Bank Stadium, Atlanta

== Knockout stage ==
=== Bowl ===
Semi-finals
16 February - 13:50 - Fifth Third Bank Stadium, Atlanta
Netherlands	17
Brazil	10
16 February - 13:28 - Fifth Third Bank Stadium, Atlanta
Ireland	7
China	26

Final
16 February - 16:56 - Fifth Third Bank Stadium, Atlanta
China	0
Netherlands	33
11th Place
16 February - 16:34 - Fifth Third Bank Stadium, Atlanta
Brazil	20
Ireland	5

=== Plate ===
Semi-finals
16 February - 15:28 - Fifth Third Bank Stadium, Atlanta
Spain	24
Japan	0
16 February - 15:06 - Fifth Third Bank Stadium, Atlanta
United States	19
England	5

Final
16 February - 18:12 - Fifth Third Bank Stadium, Atlanta
United States	22
Spain	0
7th Place
16 February - 17:50 - Fifth Third Bank Stadium, Atlanta
England	19
Japan	12

=== Cup ===
Quarter-finals
16 February - 12:22 - Fifth Third Bank Stadium, Atlanta
Australia	17
England	12
16 February - 12:00 - Fifth Third Bank Stadium, Atlanta
United States	12
Canada	26
16 February - 12:44 - Fifth Third Bank Stadium, Atlanta
Russia	26
Spain	0
16 February - 13:06 - Fifth Third Bank Stadium, Atlanta
New Zealand	42
Japan	0

Semi-finals
16 February - 15:50 - Fifth Third Bank Stadium, Atlanta
Australia	7
Canada	17
16 February - 16:12 - Fifth Third Bank Stadium, Atlanta
Russia	7
New Zealand	24

Final
16 February - 19:00 - Fifth Third Bank Stadium, Atlanta
New Zealand	36
Canada	0
Third place
16 February - 18:38 - Fifth Third Bank Stadium, Atlanta
Australia	22
Russia	12
