= 2012 Dubai Women's Sevens =

- Women's Sevens Series I
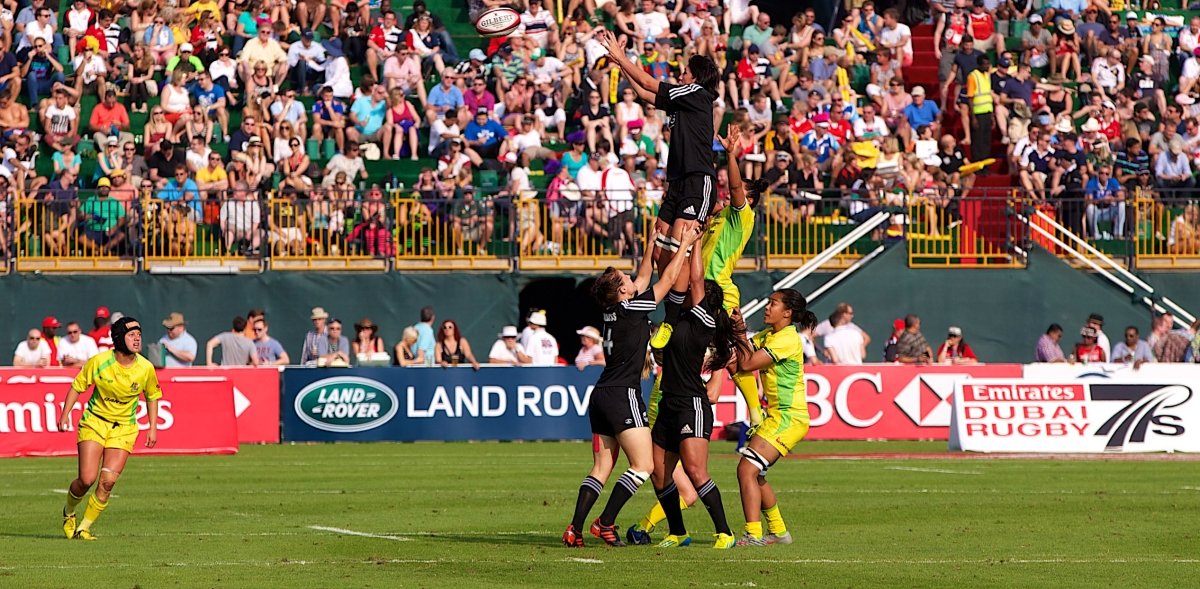
- Cup Semifinal: Australia vs New Zealand in 2012
- Host nation: United Arab Emirates
- Date: 30 November – 1 December 2012

Cup
- Champion: New Zealand
- Runner-up: South Africa

Plate
- Winner: Russia
- Runner-up: Canada

Bowl
- Winner: United States
- Runner-up: France

Tournament details
- Matches played: 34
- Tries scored: 50 (average 1.47 per match)
- Most points: (Australia) Emilee Cherry (35 points)
- Most tries: (Australia) Emilee Cherry (7 tries)

The 2012 Dubai Women's Sevens was a rugby sevens tournament held between 30 November 2012 and 1 December 2012 at The Sevens Stadium in Dubai. It was the sixth edition of the tournament and the first stop on the 2012–13 IRB Women's Sevens World Series.

New Zealand were the first champions of the new series after defeating South Africa 41–0.

== Format ==
The teams were drawn into three pools of four teams each. Each team played everyone in their pool one time. The top two teams from each pool advanced to the Cup/Plate brackets. The bottom two teams from each group went to the Bowl brackets.

== Pool stage ==
Key to colours in group tables
Teams that advanced to the Cup Quarterfinal

=== Pool A ===
Team	Pld	W	D	L	PF	PA	PD	Pts
South Africa	3	2	0	1	39	15	+24	7
England	3	2	0	1	44	27	+17	7
Spain	3	2	0	1	31	17	+14	7
Brazil	3	0	0	3	5	60	−55	3

30 November 2012
12:06

England	5 – 20	South Africa
	Report

The Sevens, Dubai

30 November 2012
12:26

Spain	19 – 0	Brazil
	Report

The Sevens, Dubai

30 November 2012
15:52

England	22 – 0	Brazil
	Report

The Sevens, Dubai

30 November 2012
16:14

Spain	5 – 0	South Africa
	Report

The Sevens, Dubai

30 November 2012
20:28

South Africa	19 – 5	Brazil
	Report

The Sevens, Dubai

30 November 2012
20:50

England	17 – 7	Spain
	Report

The Sevens, Dubai

=== Pool B ===
Team	Pld	W	D	L	PF	PA	PD	Pts
Russia	3	2	1	0	54	24	+30	8
New Zealand	3	1	2	0	55	24	+31	7
Canada	3	1	1	1	56	27	+29	6
China	3	0	0	3	0	90	−90	3

30 November 2012
12:28

Canada	12 – 15	Russia
	Report

The Sevens, Dubai

30 November 2012
12:48

New Zealand	31 – 0	China
	Report

The Sevens, Dubai

30 November 2012
16:36

Canada	32 – 0	China
	Report

The Sevens, Dubai

30 November 2012
16:58

New Zealand	12 – 12	Russia
	Report

The Sevens, Dubai

30 November 2012
20:28

Russia	27 – 0	China
	Report

The Sevens, Dubai

30 November 2012
21:12

Canada	12 – 12	New Zealand
	Report

The Sevens, Dubai

=== Pool C ===
Team	Pld	W	D	L	PF	PA	PD	Pts
Australia	3	3	0	0	68	19	+49	9
Netherlands	3	2	0	1	38	43	−5	7
United States	3	1	0	2	41	34	+7	5
France	3	0	0	3	19	70	−51	3

30 November 2012
11:42

Australia	24 – 12	Netherlands
	Report

The Sevens, Dubai

30 November 2012
12:04

United States	27 – 7	France
	Report

The Sevens, Dubai

30 November 2012
15:52

Australia	29 – 0	France
	Report

The Sevens, Dubai

30 November 2012
16:14

United States	7 – 12	Netherlands
	Report

The Sevens, Dubai

30 November 2012
20:22

Netherlands	14 – 12	France
	Report

The Sevens, Dubai

30 November 2012
20:42

Australia	15 – 7	United States
	Report

The Sevens, Dubai

== Knockout stage ==
=== Cup ===
Quarter-finals
1 December 2012 - The Sevens, Dubai
Australia	14
Canada	10
1 December 2012 - The Sevens, Dubai
New Zealand	31
England	0
1 December 2012 - The Sevens, Dubai
South Africa	12
Netherlands	7
1 December 2012 - The Sevens, Dubai
Spain	7
Russia	5

Semi-finals
1 December 2012 - The Sevens, Dubai
Australia	14
New Zealand	28
1 December 2012 - The Sevens, Dubai
South Africa	19
Spain	17

Final
1 December 2012 - The Sevens, Dubai
New Zealand	41
South Africa	0
Third place
1 December 2012 - The Sevens, Dubai
Spain	17
Australia	15

=== Plate ===
Plate semi-finals
1 December 2012 - The Sevens, Dubai
Canada	24
England	0
1 December 2012 - The Sevens, Dubai
Netherlands	5
Russia	21

Fifth place
1 December 2012 - The Sevens, Dubai
Canada	10
Russia	14
Seventh place
1 December 2012 - The Sevens, Dubai
England	26
Netherlands	5

=== Bowl ===
Bowl semi-finals
1 December 2012 - The Sevens, Dubai
United States	36
China	7
1 December 2012 - The Sevens, Dubai
France	22
Brazil	0

Ninth place
1 December 2012 - The Sevens, Dubai
United States	26
France	12
Eleventh place
1 December 2012 - The Sevens, Dubai
China	19
Brazil	17
