= 2013 USA Women's Sevens =

- Women's Sevens Series I
- Host nation: United States
- Date: February 1–2, 2013

Cup
- Champion: England
- Runner-up: United States

Plate
- Winner: Russia
- Runner-up: Netherlands

Bowl
- Winner: Brazil
- Runner-up: Japan

Tournament details
- Most points: (Russia) Baizat Khamidova (45 points)
- Most tries: (Russia) Baizat Khamidova (9 tries)

The 2013 USA Women's Sevens – the first edition of the component of the IRB Women's Sevens World Series tournament USA Women's Sevens designed for the female national teams in the Rugby 7s. It was held between February 1 to 2, 2013 for BBVA Compass Stadium in Houston as it was the second stop of the 2012–13 IRB Women's Sevens World Series.

England took home their first win of the season after defeating the host USA 29–12.

== Format ==
The teams were drawn into three pools of four teams each. Each team played everyone in their pool one time. The top two teams from each pool advanced to the Cup/Plate brackets. The bottom two teams from each group went to the Bowl brackets.

== Pool stage ==
Key to colours in group tables
Teams that advanced to the Cup Quarterfinal

=== Group A ===
Team	Pld	W	D	L	PF	PA	PD	Pts
England	3	3	0	0	72	12	+60	9
New Zealand	3	2	0	1	90	21	+69	7
Netherlands	3	1	0	2	59	57	+2	5
Trinidad and Tobago	3	0	0	3	5	136	−131	3

February 1, 2013
13:48

New Zealand	50–0	Trinidad and Tobago
	Report

BBVA Compass Stadium, Houston

February 1, 2013
14:10

England	17–7	Netherlands
	Report

BBVA Compass Stadium, Houston

February 1, 2013
16:32

New Zealand	35–14	Netherlands
	Report

BBVA Compass Stadium, Houston

February 1, 2013
16:54

England	48–0	Trinidad and Tobago
	Report

BBVA Compass Stadium, Houston

February 1, 2013
19:16

Netherlands	38–5	Trinidad and Tobago
	Report

BBVA Compass Stadium, Houston

February 1, 2013
19:38

New Zealand	5–7	England
	Report

BBVA Compass Stadium, Houston

=== Group B ===
Team	Pld	W	D	L	PF	PA	PD	Pts
United States	3	2	1	0	75	31	+44	8
Canada	3	2	1	0	67	26	+41	8
South Africa	3	1	0	2	60	46	+14	5
Argentina	3	0	0	3	0	99	−99	3

February 1, 2013
14:32

South Africa	27–0	Argentina
	Report

BBVA Compass Stadium, Houston

February 1, 2013
14:54

Canada	12–12	United States
	Report

BBVA Compass Stadium, Houston

February 1, 2013
17:16

South Africa	19–22	United States
	Report

BBVA Compass Stadium, Houston

February 1, 2013
17:38

Canada	31–0	Argentina
	Report

BBVA Compass Stadium, Houston

February 1, 2013
20:00

United States	41–0	Argentina
	Report

BBVA Compass Stadium, Houston

February 1, 2013
20:22

South Africa	14–24	Canada
	Report

BBVA Compass Stadium, Houston

=== Group C ===
Team	Pld	W	D	L	PF	PA	PD	Pts
Australia	3	3	0	0	68	22	+46	9
Russia	3	2	0	1	61	20	+41	7
Japan	3	1	0	2	34	67	−33	5
Brazil	3	0	0	3	12	66	−54	3

February 1, 2013
13:04

Australia	31–12	Japan
	Report

BBVA Compass Stadium, Houston

February 1, 2013
13:26

Russia	27–0	Brazil
	Report

BBVA Compass Stadium, Houston

February 1, 2013
15:48

Australia	22–0	Brazil
	Report

BBVA Compass Stadium, Houston

February 1, 2013
16:10

Russia	24–5	Japan
	Report

BBVA Compass Stadium, Houston

February 1, 2013
18:32

Brazil	12–17	Japan
	Report

BBVA Compass Stadium, Houston

February 1, 2013
18:54

Australia	15–10	Russia
	Report

BBVA Compass Stadium, Houston

== Knockout stage ==
=== Bowl ===
Semi-finals
February 2 – BBVA Compass Stadium, Houston
Japan	34
Trinidad and Tobago	10
February 2 – BBVA Compass Stadium, Houston
Brazil	27
Argentina	0

Final
February 2 – BBVA Compass Stadium, Houston
Japan	7
Brazil	12
Third place
February 2 – BBVA Compass Stadium, Houston
Trinidad and Tobago	5
Argentina	25

=== Plate ===
Quarter-finals
February 2 – BBVA Compass Stadium, Houston
England	19
Netherlands	12
February 2 – BBVA Compass Stadium, Houston
Canada	10
New Zealand	12
February 2 – BBVA Compass Stadium, Houston
United States	15
Russia	7
February 2 – BBVA Compass Stadium, Houston
Australia	17
South Africa	12

Semi-finals
February 2 – BBVA Compass Stadium, Houston
Netherlands	19
Canada	5
February 2 – BBVA Compass Stadium, Houston
Russia	20
South Africa	0

Final
February 2 – BBVA Compass Stadium, Houston
Netherlands	10
Russia	29
Third place
February 2 – BBVA Compass Stadium, Houston
Canada	33
South Africa	0

=== Cup ===
Quarter-finals
February 2 – BBVA Compass Stadium, Houston
England	19
Netherlands	14
February 2 – BBVA Compass Stadium, Houston
Canada	10
New Zealand	12
February 2 – BBVA Compass Stadium, Houston
United States	15
Russia	7
February 2 – BBVA Compass Stadium, Houston
Australia	17
South Africa	12

Semi-finals
February 2 – BBVA Compass Stadium, Houston
England	19
New Zealand	12
February 2 – BBVA Compass Stadium, Houston
United States	17
Australia	5

Final
February 2 – BBVA Compass Stadium, Houston
England	29
United States	12
Third place
February 2 – BBVA Compass Stadium, Houston
New Zealand	12
Australia	17
