= 2015 Canada Women's Sevens =

- Women's Sevens Series III
- Host nation: Canada
- Date: 18 – 19 April 2015

Cup
- Champion: New Zealand
- Runner-up: Russia
- Third: England

Plate
- Winner: United States
- Runner-up: Canada

Bowl
- Winner: Spain
- Runner-up: Brazil

Tournament details
- Matches played: 34

The 2015 Canada Women's Sevens was the fourth tournament within the 2014–15 World Rugby Women's Sevens Series. It was held over the weekend of 18 – 19 April 2015 at Westhills Stadium in the Victoria suburb of Langford, British Columbia.

== Format ==
The teams were drawn into three pools of four teams each. Each team played the others teams in their pool once. The top two teams from each pool advanced to the Cup/Plate brackets along with the top two third place teams. The rest of the teams played off in the Bowl bracket.

== Teams ==
- Australia
- Brazil
- Canada
- China
- England
- Fiji
- France
- New Zealand
- Russia
- South Africa
- Spain
- United States

== Pool Stage ==
Key to colours in group tables
Teams that advance to the Cup Quarterfinal

=== Pool A ===
Team	Pld	W	D	L	PF	PA	PD	Pts
New Zealand	3	3	0	0	107	36	+71	9
England	3	1	1	1	62	57	+5	6
Fiji	3	1	1	1	53	62	–9	6
Spain	3	0	0	3	29	96	–67	3

18 April 2015
11:44

England	31–14	Spain

Westhills Stadium, Victoria

18 April 2015
12:06

New Zealand	38–14	Fiji

Westhills Stadium, Victoria

18 April 2015
14:44

England	19–19	Fiji

Westhills Stadium, Victoria

18 April 2015
15:06

New Zealand	45–10	Spain

Westhills Stadium, Victoria

18 April 2015
17:44

Fiji	20–5	Spain

Westhills Stadium, Victoria

18 April 2015
18:06

New Zealand	24–12	England

Westhills Stadium, Victoria

=== Pool B ===
Team	Pld	W	D	L	PF	PA	PD	Pts
Australia	3	3	0	0	107	5	+102	9
France	3	2	0	1	61	29	+32	7
Brazil	3	1	0	2	29	77	–48	5
China	3	0	0	3	7	93	–86	3

18 April 2015
11:00

France	29–0	China

Westhills Stadium, Victoria

18 April 2015
11:22

Australia	43–0	Brazil

Westhills Stadium, Victoria

18 April 2015
14:00

France	27–5	Brazil

Westhills Stadium, Victoria

18 April 2015
14:22

Australia	40–0	China

Westhills Stadium, Victoria

18 April 2015
17:00

Brazil	24–7	China

Westhills Stadium, Victoria

18 April 2015
17:22

Australia	24–5	France

Westhills Stadium, Victoria

=== Pool C ===
Team	Pld	W	D	L	PF	PA	PD	Pts
Canada	3	3	0	0	92	30	+62	9
United States	3	2	0	1	72	38	+34	7
Russia	3	1	0	2	51	48	+3	5
South Africa	3	0	0	3	10	109	–99	3

18 April 2015
12:28

United States	40–5	South Africa

Westhills Stadium, Victoria

18 April 2015
12:50

Canada	26–15	Russia

Westhills Stadium, Victoria

18 April 2015
15:28

United States	17–14	Russia

Westhills Stadium, Victoria

18 April 2015
15:50

Canada	47–0	South Africa

Westhills Stadium, Victoria

18 April 2015
18:28

Russia	22–5	South Africa

Westhills Stadium, Victoria

18 April 2015
18:50

Canada	19–15	United States

Westhills Stadium, Victoria

== Knockout stage ==
=== Bowl ===
Semi-finals
19 April 2015 - 11:28 - Westhills Stadium, Victoria
Brazil	17
South Africa	5
19 April 2015 - 11:50 - Westhills Stadium, Victoria
Spain	33
China	5

Final
19 April 2015 - 15:36 - Westhills Stadium, Victoria
Brazil	12
Spain	14
11th Place
19 April 2015 - 14:34 - Westhills Stadium, Victoria
South Africa	21
China	31

=== Plate ===
Semi-finals
19 April 2015 - 13:06 -Westhills Stadium, Victoria
Australia	10
United States	29
19 April 2015 - 13:28 - Westhills Stadium, Victoria
Canada	45
Fiji	0

Final
19 April 2015 - 16:28 - Westhills Stadium, Victoria
United States	19
Canada	12
7th Place
19 April 2015 - 16:06 - Westhills Stadium, Victoria
Australia	22
Fiji	0

=== Cup ===
Quarter-finals
19 April 2015 - 10:00 - Westhills Stadium, Victoria
Australia	12
Russia	17
19 April 2015 - 10:22 - Westhills Stadium, Victoria
United States	0
France	17
19 April 2015 - 10:44 - Westhills Stadium, Victoria
Canada	5
England	12
19 April 2015 - 11:06 - Westhills Stadium, Victoria
New Zealand	26
Fiji	5

Semi-finals
19 April 2015 - 13:50 - Westhills Stadium, Victoria
Russia	14
France	12
19 April 2015 - 14:12 - Westhills Stadium, Victoria
England	14
New Zealand	24

Final
19 April 2015 - 17:24 - Westhills Stadium, Victoria
Russia	10
New Zealand	29
Third place
19 April 2015 - 16:58 - Westhills Stadium, Victoria
France	7
England	19
