= 2013 China Women's Sevens =

- Women's Sevens Series I
- Host nation: China
- Date: 30–31 March 2013

Cup
- Champion: New Zealand
- Runner-up: England
- Third: United States

Plate
- Winner: Ireland
- Runner-up: Netherlands

Bowl
- Winner: Japan
- Runner-up: China

Tournament details
- Matches played: 34

The 2013 China Women's Sevens was the first edition of the China Women's Sevens tournament, and the third of four tournaments in the 2012–13 IRB Women's Sevens World Series. New Zealand won the final, defeating England by 19–5.

== Format ==
Teams are drawn into three pools of four teams each. Each team plays every other team in their pool once. The top two teams from each pool advance to the Cup/Plate brackets along with the top two third place teams. The rest of the teams go to the Bowl bracket

== Teams ==
A total of twelve teams competed, the six "core" teams and six invited teams.

Core Teams

- Australia
- Canada
- England
- Netherlands
- New Zealand
- United States

Invited Teams

- Brazil
- China
- Fiji
- Ireland
- Japan
- Tunisia

== Pool Stage ==
Key to colours in group tables
Teams that advance to the Cup Quarterfinal

=== Pool A ===
Team	Pld	W	D	L	PF	PA	PD	Pts
New Zealand	3	3	0	0	102	5	+97	9
Netherlands	3	1	1	1	64	32	+32	6
Brazil	3	1	1	1	36	41	−5	6
Tunisia	3	0	0	3	0	124	−124	3

30 March 2013

New Zealand	29–0	Brazil

Guangzhou University

30 March 2013

Netherlands	47–0	Tunisia

Guangzhou University

30 March 2013

New Zealand	53–0	Tunisia

Guangzhou University

30 March 2013

Netherlands	12–12	Brazil

Guangzhou University

30 March 2013

New Zealand	20–5	Netherlands

Guangzhou University

30 March 2013

Brazil	24–0	Tunisia

Guangzhou University

=== Pool B ===
Team	Pld	W	D	L	PF	PA	PD	Pts
Canada	3	3	0	0	105	20	+85	9
Australia	3	2	0	1	48	32	+16	7
Ireland	3	1	0	2	45	45	0	5
Japan	3	0	0	3	10	111	−101	3

30 March 2013

Australia	26–5	Japan

Guangzhou University

30 March 2013

Canada	33–5	Ireland

Guangzhou University

30 March 2013

Australia	12–7	Ireland

Guangzhou University

30 March 2013

Canada	52–5	Japan

Guangzhou University

30 March 2013

Australia	10–20	Canada

Guangzhou University

30 March 2013

Japan	0–33	Ireland

Guangzhou University

=== Pool C ===
Team	Pld	W	D	L	PF	PA	PD	Pts
England	3	3	0	0	77	15	+60	9
United States	3	2	0	1	36	31	+5	7
China	3	1	0	2	32	55	−23	5
Fiji	3	0	0	3	20	54	−34	3

30 March 2013

England	24–5	China

Guangzhou University

30 March 2013

United States	15–0	Fiji

Guangzhou University

30 March 2013

England	24–10	Fiji

Guangzhou University

30 March 2013

United States	21–12	China

Guangzhou University

30 March 2013

England	19–0	United States

Guangzhou University

30 March 2013

China	15–10	Fiji

Guangzhou University

== Knockout stage ==
=== Bowl ===
Semi-finals
31 March – Guangzhou University
China	57
Tunisia	0
31 March – Guangzhou University
Fiji	5
Japan	12

Final
31 March – Guangzhou University
China	10
Japan	14
11th Place
31 March – Guangzhou University
Fiji	19
Tunisia	0

=== Plate ===
Semi-finals
31 March – Guangzhou University
Netherlands	22
Brazil	0
31 March – Guangzhou University
Ireland	15
Australia	14

Final
31 March – Guangzhou University
Netherlands	10
Ireland	14
7th Place
31 March – Guangzhou University
Australia	7
Brazil	5

=== Cup ===
Quarter-finals
31 March – Guangzhou University
New Zealand	31
Ireland	5
31 March – Guangzhou University
Australia	14
United States	17
31 March – Guangzhou University
England	19
Netherlands	12
31 March – Guangzhou University
Brazil	0
Canada	33

Semi-finals
31 March – Guangzhou University
New Zealand	24
United States	12
31 March – Guangzhou University
England	19
Canada	0

Final
31 March – Guangzhou University
New Zealand	19
England	5
Third place
31 March – Guangzhou University
United States	5
Canada	17
