= 2012–13 IRB Women's Sevens World Series =

World Rugby Women's Sevens Series I
- Hosts: United Arab Emirates; United States; China; Netherlands
- Date: 30 Nov 2012 – 18 May 2013

Final positions
- Champions: New Zealand
- Runners-up: England

Series details
- Top try scorer: (New Zealand) Portia Woodman (21 tries)
- Top point scorer: (New Zealand) Portia Woodman (105 points)

The IRB Women's Sevens World Series (2012/2013) was the inaugural edition of the IRB Women's Sevens World Series, organized by the IRB annual series of tournaments for women's national teams in the Rugby Sevens.

In October 2012 the IRB announced that the season would consist of four tournaments - in Dubai, Houston, Guangzhou and Amsterdam - played from November 2012 to May 2013. The Dubai tournament was held in conjunction with the 2012 Dubai Sevens for men, while the others were separate competitions. The number of teams in each of the events was set at twelve, with six core teams participating in all tournaments of the series and the other teams identified by elimination or rankings within the IRB's six regions.

== Itinerary ==
2012–13 Itinerary
Leg	Venue	Date	Winner
Dubai	The Sevens, Dubai	30 Nov–1 Dec 2012	New Zealand
United States	BBVA Compass Stadium, Houston	1–2 February 2013	England
China	Guangzhou University Town Stadium, Guangzhou	30–31 March 2013	New Zealand
Netherlands	NRCA Stadium, Amsterdam	17–18 May 2013	New Zealand

== The competition ==
As with the male competition, series winner was the team that scored the most points awarded for winning various places in each event throughout the season. Each of the twelve team competition accumulate, six of which (Australia, Canada, England, Netherlands, New Zealand, United States) is a series of regular participants (core teams), while others might be identified through regional qualifying.

== Points schedule ==
The season championship will be determined by points earned in each tournament. The scoring system, similar to that used in the men's IRB Sevens, was announced shortly before the season kicked off.

- Cup Winner - 20
- Cup Runner Up - 18
- 3rd Place - 16
- Cup Semi Finalist - 14
- Plate Winner - 12
- Plate Runner Up - 10
- Winner 7th/8th play-off - 8
- Loser 7th/8th play-off - 6
- Bowl Winner - 4
- Bowl Runner Up - 3
- Winner 11th/12th play-off - 2
- Loser 11th/12th play-off - 1

== Standings ==
The final standings after completion of the four tournaments of the series are shown in the table below.

The points awarded to teams at each tournament, as well as the overall season totals, are shown. Gold indicates the event champions. Silver indicates the event runner-ups. Bronze indicates the event third place finishers.

Final standings for the 2012–13 series:

2012–13 IRB Women's Sevens World – Series I
Pos.	Event Team	Dubai	Houston	Guangzhou	Amsterdam	Points total
1st place, gold medalist(s)	New Zealand	20	14	20	20	74
2nd place, silver medalist(s)	England	8	20	18	14	60
3rd place, bronze medalist(s)	Canada	10	8	16	18	52
4	United States	4	18	14	12	48
5	Australia	14	16	8	8	46
6	Russia	12	12	–	16	40
7	Netherlands	6	10	10	4	30
8	South Africa	18	6	–	3	27
9	Spain	16	–	–	10	26
10	Brazil	1	4	6	1	12
11	Ireland	–	–	12	–	12
12	France	3	–	–	6	9
13	China	2	–	3	2	7
14	Japan	–	3	4	–	7
15	Argentina	–	2	–	–	2
16	Fiji	–	–	2	–	2
17	Trinidad and Tobago	–	1	–	–	1
18	Tunisia	–	–	1	–	1

Legend
Gold	Event Champions
Silver	Event Runner-ups
Bronze	Event Third place finishers

Notes:

- These standings did not qualify teams for women's rugby sevens World Series II. Quarterfinalists from 2013 Rugby World Cup Sevens gained core team status for 2013–14.

== Season ==
=== Round 1: Dubai ===
Semi-finals
1 December – Dubai
Australia	14
New Zealand	28
1 December – Dubai
South Africa	19
Spain	17

Final
1 December – Dubai
New Zealand	41
South Africa	0
Third place
1 December – Dubai
Australia	15
Spain	17

=== Round 2: United States ===
Semi-finals
2 February – Houston
England	19
New Zealand	12
2 February – Houston
United States	17
Australia	5

Final
2 February – Houston
England	29
United States	12
Third place
2 February – Houston
New Zealand	12
Australia	17

=== Round 3: China ===
Semi-finals
31 March – Guangzhou
England	19
Canada	0
31 March – Guangzhou
New Zealand	24
United States	12

Final
31 March – Guangzhou
New Zealand	19
England	5
Third place
31 March – Guangzhou
United States	5
Canada	17

=== Round 4: Netherlands ===
Semi-finals
17 May – Amsterdam
New Zealand	24
Russia	10
17 May – Amsterdam
England	7
Canada	12

Final
18 May – Amsterdam
New Zealand	33
Canada	24
Third place
18 May – Amsterdam
Russia	26
England	5
