= 2016 Rugby Europe Women's Sevens Grand Prix Series =

International rugby sevens competition

- Hosts: Russia; France
- Nations: 12

Final positions
- Champions: Russia
- Runners-up: France
- Third: Ireland

The 2016 Rugby Europe Women's Sevens Grand Prix Series was the top level of international women's rugby sevens competitions organised by Rugby Europe during 2016. The series featured two tournaments, one hosted in Kazan and one hosted in Malemort. In preparation for 2016 Summer Olympics, England and Wales were replaced by two Great Britain representative teams, the Lions and the Royals. France won the Kazan tournament while Russia won the Malemort tournament. Russia won the overall championship. Finland and Ukraine were relegated to the 2017 Trophy series.

== Kazan ==
Kazan Tournament
- Host nation: Russia
- Date: 11–12 June 2016

Cup
- Champion: France
- Runner-up: Russia
- Third: Great Britain Lions

Plate
- Winner: Great Britain Royals
- Runner-up: Spain

Bowl
- Winner: Italy
- Runner-up: Belgium

=== Pool stages ===
==== Pool A ====
Teams	Pld	W	D	L	PF	PA	+/−	Pts
France	3	3	0	0	117	17	+100	9
Great Britain Royals	3	2	0	1	70	41	+29	7
Netherlands	3	1	0	2	46	61	-15	5
Finland	3	0	0	3	7	121	-114	3

Matches

11 June 2016
8:00

France	51–0	Finland

11 June 2016
8:22

Netherlands	10–19	Great Britain Royals

11 June 2016
10:45

France	31–7	Great Britain Royals

11 June 2016
11:07

Netherlands	26–7	Finland

11 June 2016
13:30

France	35–10	Netherlands

11 June 2016
13:52

Great Britain Royals	44–0	Finland

==== Pool B ====
Teams	Pld	W	D	L	PF	PA	+/−	Pts
Russia	3	3	0	0	109	5	+104	9
Ireland	3	2	0	1	48	36	+12	7
Italy	3	1	0	2	24	76	-52	5
Belgium	3	0	0	3	26	90	-64	3

Matches

11 June 2016
9:28

Ireland	31–0	Italy

11 June 2016
9:50

Russia	54–0	Belgium

11 June 2016
12:13

Ireland	12–7	Belgium

11 June 2016
12:35

Russia	26–0	Italy

11 June 2016
14:58

Italy	24–19	Belgium

11 June 2016
15:20

Russia	29–5	Ireland

==== Pool C ====
Teams	Pld	W	D	L	PF	PA	+/−	Pts
Great Britain Lions	3	3	0	0	152	0	+152	9
Spain	3	2	0	1	60	78	-18	7
Portugal	3	1	0	2	45	59	-14	5
Ukraine	3	0	0	3	14	134	-120	3

Matches

11 June 2016
18:44

Spain	12–7	Portugal

11 June 2016
19:06

Great Britain Lions	48–0	Ukraine

11 June 2016
11:29

Spain	48–7	Ukraine

11 June 2016
11:51

Great Britain Lions	40–0	Portugal

11 June 2016
14:14

Spain	0–64	Great Britain Lions

11 June 2016
14:36

Ukraine	7–38	Portugal

=== Knockout stage ===
==== Bowl ====
Semi-finals
12 June 2016 – 9:28
Italy	15
Ukraine	12
12 June 2016 – 9:50
Belgium	31
Finland	12

Final
12 June 2016 – 13:05
Italy	19
Belgium	0
Third place
12 June 2016 – 12:43
Ukraine	19
Finland	0

==== Plate ====
Quarter-finals
12 June 2016 – 8:00
France	17
Netherlands	0
12 June 2016 – 9:06
Ireland	19
Spain	10
12 June 2016 – 8:22
Russia	28
Portugal	5
12 June 2016 – 8:44
Great Britain Lions	24
Great Britain Royals	5

Semi-finals
12 June 2016 – 11:15
Netherlands	17
Spain	22
12 June 2016 – 11:37
Portugal	0
Great Britain Royals	36

Final
12 June 2016 – 14:24
Spain	0
Great Britain Royals	44
Third place
12 June 2016 – 14:02
Netherlands	12
Portugal	7

==== Cup ====
Quarter-finals
12 June 2016 – 8:00
France	17
Netherlands	0
12 June 2016 – 9:06
Ireland	19
Spain	10
12 June 2016 – 8:22
Russia	28
Portugal	5
12 June 2016 – 8:44
Great Britain Lions	24
Great Britain Royals	5

Semi-finals
12 June 2016 – 11:59
France	28
Ireland	12
12 June 2016 – 12:21
Russia	19
Great Britain Lions	17

Final
12 June 2016 – 14:52
France	22
Russia	12
Third place
12 June 2016 – 15:14
Ireland	0
Great Britain Lions	32

== Malemort ==
Malemort Tournament
- Host nation: France
- Date: 24–25 September 2016

Cup
- Champion: Russia
- Runner-up: France
- Third: Great Britain Lions

Plate
- Winner: Netherlands
- Runner-up: Great Britain Royals

Bowl
- Winner: Italy
- Runner-up: Finland

=== Pool stages ===
==== Pool A ====
Teams	Pld	W	D	L	PF	PA	+/−	Pts
France	3	3	0	0	112	14	+98	9
Spain	3	2	0	1	55	33	+22	7
Netherlands	3	1	0	2	43	45	-2	5
Finland	3	0	0	3	0	118	-118	3

Matches

24 September 2016
11:28

Spain	12–7	Netherlands

24 September 2016
11:50

France	53–0	Finland

24 September 2016
14:13

Spain	29–0	Finland

24 September 2016
14:35

France	33–0	Netherlands

24 September 2016
16:58

Netherlands	36–0	Finland

24 September 2016
17:20

France	26–14	Spain

==== Pool B ====
Teams	Pld	W	D	L	PF	PA	+/−	Pts
Russia	3	3	0	0	148	0	+148	9
Great Britain Royals	3	2	0	1	56	43	+13	7
Portugal	3	1	0	2	24	99	-75	5
Ukraine	3	0	0	3	26	112	-86	3

Matches

24 September 2016
10:44

Russia	51–0	Ukraine

24 September 2016
11:06

Great Britain Royals	19–0	Portugal

24 September 2016
13:29

Russia	59–0	Portugal

24 September 2016
13:51

Great Britain Royals	37–5	Ukraine

24 September 2016
16:14

Portugal	24–21	Ukraine

24 September 2016
16:36

Russia	38–0	Great Britain Royals

==== Pool C ====
Teams	Pld	W	D	L	PF	PA	+/−	Pts
Ireland	3	2	1	0	51	22	+29	8
Great Britain Lions	3	2	0	1	40	51	-11	7
Belgium	3	1	0	2	24	38	-14	5
Italy	3	0	1	2	29	33	-4	4

Matches

24 September 2016
10:00

Great Britain Lions	21–12	Belgium

24 September 2016
10:22

Ireland	12–12	Italy

24 September 2016
12:45

Great Britain Lions	14–12	Italy

24 September 2016
13:07

Ireland	12–5	Belgium

24 September 2016
15:30

Italy	5–7	Belgium

24 September 2016
15:52

Great Britain Lions	5–27	Ireland

=== Knockout stage ===
==== Bowl ====
Semi-finals
25 September 2016 – 11:28
Portugal	12
Finland	19
25 September 2016 – 11:50
Italy	14
Ukraine	7

Final
25 September 2016 – 15:05
Finland	0
Italy	34
Third place
25 September 2016 – 14:43
Portugal	22
Ukraine	5

==== Plate ====
Quarter-finals
25 September 2016 – 10:00
France	31
Belgium	7
25 September 2016 – 11:06
Great Britain Royals	5
Great Britain Lions	14
25 September 2016 – 10:22
Russia	21
Netherlands	0
25 September 2016 – 10:44
Ireland	26
Spain	0

Semi-finals
25 September 2016 – 13:15
Belgium	7
Great Britain Royals	29
25 September 2016 – 13:37
Netherlands	24
Spain	5

Final
25 September 2016 – 16:24
Great Britain Royals	0
Netherlands	10
Third place
25 September 2016 – 16:02
Belgium	14
Spain	19

==== Cup ====
Quarter-finals
25 September 2016 – 10:00
France	31
Belgium	7
25 September 2016 – 11:06
Great Britain Royals	5
Great Britain Lions	14
25 September 2016 – 10:22
Russia	21
Netherlands	0
25 September 2016 – 10:44
Ireland	26
Spain	0

Semi-finals
25 September 2016 – 13:59
France	22
Great Britain Lions	19
25 September 2016 – 14:21
Russia	27
Ireland	5

Final
25 September 2016 – 17:14
France	5
Russia	26
Third place
25 September 2016 – 16:52
Great Britain Lions	12
Ireland	5

== Final standings ==
Date	Venue	Winner	Runner-up	Third
11–12 June	(Russia) Kazan	France	Russia	Great Britain Lions
24–25 September	(France) Malemort	Russia	France	Great Britain Lions

The three highest teams who did not already have core team status during the 2016–17 World Rugby Women's Sevens Series qualified for the 2017 Hong Kong Women's Sevens, which in turn was a qualifying event for promotion to core team status on the 2017–18 World Rugby Women's Sevens Series.

Legend
Winner
Qualified for the 2017 Hong Kong Women's Sevens
Relegated to 2017 Trophy series

Rank	Team	Kazan	Malemort	Points
1st place, gold medalist(s)	Russia	18	20	38
2nd place, silver medalist(s)	France	20	18	38
–	Great Britain Lions ^{[Note 1]}	16	16	32
3rd place, bronze medalist(s)	Ireland	14	14	28
–	Great Britain Royals ^{[Note 1]}	12	10	22
4	Netherlands	8	12	20
5	Spain	10	8	18
6	Belgium	3	6	9
7	Italy	4	4	8
7	Portugal	6	2	8
9	Finland	1	3	4
10	Ukraine	2	1	3

Notes

- ^1 The two Great Britain representative teams, the Lions and the Royals were not included in the official ranking.
