= United States women's national rugby sevens team =

United States
- Union: USA Rugby
- Nickname: Eagles
- Coach: Emilie Bydwell
- Captain: Kristi Kirshe
- Top scorer: Alev Kelter (752)
- Most tries: Alev Kelter (87)
Team kit	Change kit

World Cup Sevens
- Appearances: 4 (First in 2009)
- Best result: 3rd place (2009, 2013)

Official website
- www.usa.rugby/womens-eagles-sevens/

Medal record

Olympic Games
Bronze medal – third place	2024 Paris	Team

Pan American Games
Gold medal – first place	2023 Santiago	Team
Silver medal – second place	2015 Toronto	Team
Silver medal – second place	2019 Lima	Team

The United States women's national rugby sevens team competes in international rugby sevens competitions. The team finished second at the 2015 USA Women's Sevens, after defeating Russia in the semifinals. They have competed at three Summer Olympics, and won a bronze medal at the 2024 Summer Olympics.

== History ==
Under head coach Ric Suggit, the Eagles placed third at the 2013 Women's Sevens World Cup in Russia. They defeated Spain 10–5 in their final match, with tries coming from Emilie Bydwell and Vanesha McGee.

In June 2019, the Eagles became just the fifth team to have won a World Series tournament, joining New Zealand, Australia, Canada, and England. In that same season, the Americans finished second in the overall standings, securing both their highest finish to date and automatic qualification to the 2020 Olympic Games.

Head Coach, Emilie Bydwell, led the team to an Olympic Bronze Medal in Paris 2024 beating Australia [14-12] with a Try and made Conversion with no time left on the clock.

== Tournament History ==
=== World Rugby Sevens Series ===
Season by season

Season	Rank	Points	Events	Cups	Plates	Bowls*	Result	Most tries	Most points
2012–13	4th	48	4	0	1	1	Dubai - 9th Houston - (silver); Guangzhou - 4th Amsterdam - 5th		
2013–14	7th	38	5	0	2	1	Dubai - 7th Atlanta - 5th São Paulo - 9th Guangzhou - 11th Amsterdam - 5th		
2014–15	5th	76	6	0	1	0	Dubai - 7th São Paulo - 6th Atlanta - (silver); Langford - 5th London - 4th Amsterdam - 4th		
2015–16	6th	46	5	0	1	0	Dubai - 11th São Paulo - 4th Atlanta - 5th Langford - 7th Clermont - 6th		
2016–17	6th	62	6	0	—N/a	0	Dubai - 11th Sydney - (silver); Las Vegas - 4th Kitakyushu - 7th Langford - 6th Clermont - 6th		
2017–18	5th	56	5	0	—N/a	1	Dubai - (silver); Sydney - 8th Kitakyushu - 9th Langford - (bronze); Paris - 5th		
2018–19	2nd	100	6	1	—N/a	0	Glendale - (silver); Dubai - 4th Sydney - (bronze); Kitakyushu - (bronze); Langford - (bronze); Biarritz - (gold)	Naya Tapper (18)	Alev Kelter (141)
2019–20	5th	66	5	1	—N/a	0	Glendale - (gold); Dubai - (bronze); Cape Town - 5th Hamilton - 5th Sydney - 8th	Alev Kelter (21)	Alev Kelter (171)
2021	Season cancelled due to impacts of the COVID-19 pandemic								
2021–22	6th	56	6	1	—N/a		Dubai I - 7th Dubai II - 5th Málaga - (gold); Seville - 4th Langford - 6th Toulouse - 7th	Jaz Gray (18)	
2022–23	3rd	108	7	0	—N/a		Dubai - (bronze); Cape Town - (bronze); Hamilton - (silver); Sydney - (bronze); Vancouver - (bronze); Hong Kong - 7th Toulouse - (silver)		
2023–24	4th	85	7	0	—N/a		Dubai - 7th Cape Town - 4th Perth - 4th Vancouver - 5th Los Angeles - (bronze); Hong Kong - (silver); Singapore - 10th	Jaz Gray	
2023–24	5th (Grand Finals)	—N/a	1	—N/a	—N/a		Madrid - 5th		
2024–25	6th	58	6	0	—N/a		Dubai - 5th Cape Town - (silver); Perth - 6th Vancouver - 8th Hong Kong - 6th Singapore - 11th		
2024–25	4th (Grand Finals)	—N/a	1	—N/a	—N/a		United States - 4th		
2025–26	3rd	86	6	0	—N/a		Dubai - 5th Cape Town - 4th Singapore - 4th Perth - 4th Vancouver - (bronze); New York - (bronze)		
2025–26	4th (Grand Finals)	44	3		—N/a		Hong Kong - 5th Valladolid - (silver); Bordeaux - 4th		
Total	—N/a		79	3	5	3	—N/a	Naya Tapper (77)	Alev Kelter (624)

* – At the start of the 2016–17 season, the plate was abandoned, with the bowl replaced by the Challenge Trophy.

=== Olympic Games ===
Olympic Games record
Year	Round	Position	Pld	W	L	D
(Brazil) 2016	Quarterfinals	5th	6	3	2	1
(Japan) 2020	5th place match	6th	6	4	2	0
(France) 2024	Bronze Final	3rd place, bronze medalist(s)	6	4	2	0
Total	0 Title	3/3	18	11	6	1

=== Rugby World Cup Sevens ===
Rugby World Cup Sevens
Year	Round	Position	Pld	W	L	D
(United Arab Emirates) 2009	Semifinals	3rd place, bronze medalist(s)	5	3	2	0
(Russia) 2013	3rd place playoff	3rd place, bronze medalist(s)	6	5	1	0
(United States) 2018	Bronze Final	4th	4	2	2	0
(South Africa) 2022	Bronze Final	4th	4	2	2	0
(England) 2025	Qualified					
Total	0 Title	4/4	19	12	7	0

=== Pan American Games ===
Pan American Games record
Year	Round	Position	Pld	W	L	D
(Canada) 2015	Gold Final	2nd place, silver medalist(s)	6	4	2	0
(Peru) 2019	Gold Final	2nd place, silver medalist(s)	5	4	1	0
(Chile) 2023	Gold Final	1st place, gold medalist(s)	5	5	0	0
Total	1 Title	3/3	16	13	3	0

=== Rugby X Tournament ===
Rugby X Tournament
Year	Position	Pld	W	L	D
(England) 2019	2nd	2	1	1	0

== Players ==
=== Current squad ===
Squad named for the 2023 World Rugby HSBC Sevens Series in Vancouver from the 3–5 March.

(United States) USA Women 7's

#	Player	Position	Height	Weight	Date of birth	Matches	Points scored
1	Cheta Emba	Inside Centre	1.82 m (6 ft 0 in)	80 kg (180 lb)	July 16, 1993	144	200
2	Ilona Maher	Outside Centre	1.77 m (5 ft 10 in)	90 kg (200 lb)	August 12, 1996	116	240
3	Kayla Canett	Fly Half	1.60 m (5 ft 3 in)	63 kg (139 lb)	April 29, 1998	95	93
4	Nicole Heavirland	Inside Centre	1.65 m (5 ft 5 in)	66 kg (146 lb)	February 25, 1995	174	414
6	Alena Olsen	Scrum half	1.63 m (5 ft 4 in)	63 kg (139 lb)	June 12, 1995	73	60
7	Naya Tapper C	Tighthead Prop	1.75 m (5 ft 9 in)	79 kg (174 lb)	August 3, 1994	167	570
11	Kristen Thomas	Left wing	1.73 m (5 ft 8 in)	70 kg (150 lb)	July 1, 1993	183	455
12	Kristi Kirshe	Outside Centre	1.60 m (5 ft 3 in)	65 kg (143 lb)	October 14, 1994	101	245
15	Alev Kelter	Outside Centre	1.70 m (5 ft 7 in)	76 kg (168 lb)	March 21, 1991	192	843
21	Ariana Ramsey	Left wing	1.62 m (5 ft 4 in)	63 kg (139 lb)	March 25, 2000	5	0
22	Sammy Sullivan	Fly Half	1.63 m (5 ft 4 in)	65 kg (143 lb)	May 22, 1998	29	75
23	Lauren Doyle	Inside Centre	1.70 m (5 ft 7 in)	65 kg (143 lb)	February 23, 1991	187	347

Coach: Emilie Bydwell
2022–23 World Rugby Women's Sevens Series

== Notable players ==
- Akalaini (Bui) Baravilala
- Carmen Farmer
- Jessica Watkins
- Jessica Javelet
- Jillion Potter
- Joanne Fa'avesi
- Kelly Griffin
- Richelle Stephens
- Victoria (Vix) Folayan

=== Award winners ===
The following United States Sevens players have been recognised at the World Rugby Awards since 2013:

World Rugby Women's 7s Dream Team
Year	No.	Player
2024	3.	Kristi Kirshe
2024	5.	Ilona Maher

== Honors ==
World Series
Finish Tourney	Gold	Silver	Bronze	Plate (Fifth)
Dubai Sevens	—	2017	2015	
USA Sevens	—	2013, 2015 & 2018	—	2014 & 2016
China Sevens	—	—	2013	—
Amsterdam Sevens	—	—	—	2013 & 2014
São Paulo Sevens	—	—	—	—
Australia Sevens	—	2017	2019	—
Japan Sevens	—	—	2019	—
Canada Sevens	—	—	2018 & 2019	2015
France Sevens	2019	—	—	2018
Spain Sevens	2022 (Malaga)	—	—	—
New Zealand Sevens	—	—	2023	—

Other Top Three Finishes

- 2005 NAWIRA Women's 7s – Champion
- 2008 NAWIRA Women's 7s – Champion
- 2015 NACRA Sevens – Champion
- 2015 Pan American Games – Silver

Plate Champions

- 2013 Amsterdam Women's Sevens
- 2014 USA Women's Sevens
- 2014 Netherlands Women's Sevens
- 2015 Canada Women's Sevens
- 2016 USA Women's Sevens
- 2018 France Women's Sevens

Bowl Champions/Challenge Trophy/Challenge Cup

- 2012 Dubai Women's Sevens
- 2014 São Paulo Women's Sevens
- 2018 Japan Women's Sevens

== See also ==
- Women's Premier League Rugby
- United States national rugby sevens team (men's)
