= Amsterdam Women's Sevens =

The Amsterdam Women's Sevens began in 2005. On 4 October 2012, the IRB announced the launch of the IRB Women's Sevens World Series, the women's counterpart to the wildly successful IRB Sevens World Series for men. The inaugural 2012–13 season featured four events, with the Amsterdam Sevens as the final event in May 2013. The 2014–15 World Rugby Women's Sevens Series was the last series to feature Amsterdam as an event.

Rugby Union Sevens - a short form of the sport of rugby union - was first played in 1883, with the first (men's) internationals taking place in 1973. As women's rugby union developed in the 1960s and 1970s the format became very popular as it allowed games, and entire leagues, to be developed in countries even when player numbers were small, and it remains the main form the women's game is played in most parts of the world.

However, although the first Women's international rugby union 15-a-side test match took place in 1982, it was not until 1997 before the first Women's International Rugby Union Sevens tournaments were played, when the Hong Kong Sevens included a women's tournament for the first time. Over the next decade the number of tournaments grew, with almost every region developing regular championship. This reached its zenith with 2009's inaugural women's tournament for the Rugby World Cup Sevens, shortly followed by the announcement that women's rugby sevens will be included in the Olympics from 2016.

The Amsterdam Sevens began in 1972, but did not include an international women's tournament until 2005. The following are details of all Amsterdam women's international tournaments, listed chronologically with the earliest first, with all result details, where known.

NOTE: New Zealand Wild Ducks and Aotearoa Maori New Zealand. Prior to the early 2000s, the NZRFU would not condone or send any official team, but an invitation team made up largely of Black Ferns and upcoming talented players did go to the HKG 7s each year in the late nineties from the inception of the HKG tournament. This team was named the Wild Ducks. It had no official status whatsoever, and the matches it played cannot be considered official internationals. The first official NZ team took part in 2000 and 2001, but from 2002 onwards the NZRFU again declined to send a team, whereby interested women's rugby officials from the Bay of Plenty in particular received the union's blessing to send a Maori team "Aotearoa" to HKG. For the first couple of years this team was pretty much strictly Maori in its makeup. However, for the later tournaments Black Ferns and upcoming players of any ethnicity were selected. It is not an official team and its matches should not be considered internationals but it has the union's blessing to compete in international tournaments.

== 2005 ==
No known international entrants

Semi-final

- W.O.P. 26-14 Simon Fraser U
- Samurai Women 19-14 Henley Hawks

Final W.O.P 0-60 Samurai Women

== 2006 ==
20–21 May 2006 No information available.

== 2007 ==
Complete results not available.

Semi-finals

- Canada 0-40 Wooden Spoon (ENG)
- Red Dragons (WAL) 0-33 Richmond

Final

- Wooden Spoon 27-7 Richmond

== 2008 ==
17–18 May 2008.

DAY ONE (17 May)

Pool 1

Nation	Won	Drawn	Lost	For	Against
Wooden Spoon (ENG)	4	0	0	158	12
Canada (CAN)	3	0	1	155	12
Moody Cows (INT)	2	0	2	41	89
Pirates (ENG)	1	0	3	52	106
Waterland Dames (NED)	0	0	4	5	192

- Canada 47-0 Pirates
- Wooden Spoon 53-0 Waterland Dames
- Moody Cows 12-7 Pirates
- Canada 65-0 Waterland Dames
- Wooden Spoon 46-0 Moody Cows
- Waterland Dames 0-45 Pirates
- Canada 31-0 Moody Cows
- Wooden Spoon 47-0 Pirates
- Moody Cows 29-5 Waterland Dames
- Wooden Spoon 12-12 Canada

Pool 2

Nation	Won	Drawn	Lost	For	Against
Aotearoa Maori (NZL)	4	0	0	212	0
Brazil Gold (BRA)	3	0	1	150	33
Pink Ba-baas (INT)	2	0	2	32	98
OA Airlines Business Class (ENG)	1	0	3	20	117
Hanze (NED)	0	0	4	5	171

- Hanze 5-15 OA Airlines Business Class
- Pink Ba-bas 0-36 Brazil Gold
- Aotearoa Maori 59-0 OA Airlines Business Class
- Hanze 0-73 Brazil Gold
- Pink Ba-bas 0-57 Aotearoa Maori
- Brazil Gold 41-0 OA Airlines Business Class
- Hanze 0-63 Aotearoa Maori
- Pink Ba-bas 12-5 OA Airlines Business Class
- Aotearoa Maori 33-0 Brazil Gold
- Pink Ba-bas 20-0 Hanze

Pool 3

Nation	Won	Drawn	Lost	For	Against
USA	4	0	0	247	0
Susies Valkyries (INT)	3	0	1	120	59
Czech Republic	2	0	2	76	110
AAC Amsterdam (NED)	1	0	3	47	122
OA Airlines Economy Class (ENG)	0	0	4	5	204

- AAC Amsterdam 32-0 OA Airlines Economy Class
- USA 64-0 Czech Republic
- Susies Valkyries 49-0 OA Airlines Economy Class
- AAC Amsterdam 10-26 Czech Republic
- USA 49-0 Susies Valkyries
- Czech Republic 45-5 OA Airlines Economy Class
- AAC Amsterdam 5-40 Susies Valkyries
- USA 78-0 OA Airlines Economy Class
- Susies Valkyries 31-5 Czech Republic
- USA 56-0 AAC Amsterdam

Pool 4

Nation	Won	Drawn	Lost	For	Against
Samurai St George's (ENG)	4	0	0	226	0
Corsolettes (INT)	3	0	1	76	82
Brazil Blue (BRA)	2	0	2	70	66
Norwegian Raiderettes (NOR)	1	0	3	43	127
Bassets (NED)	0	0	4	10	150

- Norwegian Raiderettes 19-21 Corsolettes
- Bassets 0-28 Brazil Blue
- Samurai St George's 56-0 Corsoletts
- Norwegian Raiderettes 5-35 Brazil Blue
- Bassets 0-60 Samurai St George's
- Brazil Blue 7-12 Corsolettes
- Norwegian Raiderettes 0-61 Samurai St George's
- Bassets 0-43 Corsolettes
- Samurai St George's 49-0 Brazil Blue
- Bassets 10-19 Norwegian Raiderettes

DAY TWO (18 May)

Plate tournament (9th-16th place)

Plate quarter-finals

- Czech Republic 24-21 OA Airlines Business Class
- AAC Amsterdam 7-29 Pink Ba-bas
- Moody Cows 17-31 Brazil Blue
- Norwegian Raiderettes 0-42 Pirates

Plate semi-finals

- Czech Republic 7-26 Pirates
- Brazil Blue 19-7 Pink Ba-bas

Plate final

- Pirates 31-5 Brazil Blue

Cup tournament (1st-8th place)

Cup Pool 1

Nation	Won	Drawn	Lost	For	Against
USA	3	0	0	101	0
Brazil Gold	2	0	1	45	34
Wooden Spoon	1	0	2	32	43
Corsolettes	0	0	3	10	111

- USA 44_0 Corsolettes
- Wooden Spoon 5-5 Brazil Gold
- USA 24-0 Brazil Gold
- Wooden Spoon 27-5 Corsolettes
- Brazil Gold 40-5 Corsolettes
- USA 33-0 Wooden Spoon

Cup Pool 2

Nation	Won	Drawn	Lost	For	Against
Aotearoa Maori	3	0	0	71	12
Samurai St George's	2	0	1	75	19
Canada	1	0	2	43	38
Susies Valkyries	0	0	3	0	120

- Aotearoa Maori 12-5 Canada
- Samurai St George's 42-0 Susies Valkyries
- Aotearoa Maori 40-0 Susies Valkyries
- Samurai St George's 26-0 Canada
- Canada 38-0 Susies Valkyries
- Samurai St George's 7-19 Aotearoa Maori

Cup semi-finals

- Samurai St George's 14-5 USA
- Aotearoa Maori 48-0 Brazil Gold

Cup final

- Samurai St George's 24-5 Aotearoa Maori

== 2009 ==
16–17 May

Pool 1

Nation	Won	Drawn	Lost	For	Against
Samurai (INT)	5	0	0	217	7
Susies Valkyries (INT)	4	0	1	129	66
RC The Bassets (NED)	3	0	2	100	111
Czech Republic (CZE)	2	0	3	80	132
Pink Ba- ba's (UK)	1	0	4	36	155
Norwegian Raiderettes (NOR)	0	0	5	51	142

- Samurai International Ladies 24-7 Norwegian Raiderettes
- Czech Republic 26-24 RC The Bassets
- Susies Valkyries 43-0 Pink Ba- ba's
- RC The Bassets 26-25 Norwegian Raiderettes
- Samurai International Ladies 50-0 Pink Ba- ba's
- Czech Republic 0-31 Susies Valkyries
- Pink Ba- ba's 0-29 RC The Bassets
- Samurai International Ladies 38-0 Susies Valkyries
- Czech Republic 28-5 Norwegian Raiderettes
- Samurai International Ladies 43 0 RC The Bassets
- Czech Republic 26-10 Pink Ba- ba's
- Susies Valkyries 38-7 Norwegian Raiderettes
- Samurai International Ladies 62-0 Czech Republic
- Pink Ba- ba's 26-7 Norwegian Raiderettes
- Susies Valkyries 17-21 RC The Bassets

Quarter-finals

- Samurai 48-0 AAC Amsterdam
- RC The Bassets 5-29 Corsolettes
- Susies Valkyries 0-24 Germany
- Czech Republic 0-48 Wooden Spoon

Plate Semi-finals

- AAC Amsterdam 0-28 RC The Bassets
- Susies Valkyries 12-14 Czech Republic

Plate Final

- RC The Bassets 40-0 Czech Republic

Pool 2

Nation	Won	Drawn	Lost	For	Against
Wooden Spoon (ENG)	5	0	0	295	7
Corsolettes (NED)	4	0	1	132	85
Germany (GER)	3	0	2	160	80
AAC Amsterdam (NED)	2	0	3	31	150
Moody Cows (UK)	0	1	4	34	161
Sabbie Mobili (ITA)	0	1	4	19	188

- Samurai International Ladies 24-7 Norwegian Raiderettes
- Czech Republic 26-24 RC The Bassets
- Susies Valkyries 43-0 Pink Ba- ba's
- RC The Bassets 26-25 Norwegian Raiderettes
- Samurai International Ladies 50-0 Pink Ba- ba's
- Czech Republic 0-31 Susies Valkyries
- Pink Ba- ba's 0-29 RC The Bassets
- Samurai International Ladies 38-0 Susies Valkyries
- Czech Republic 28-5 Norwegian Raiderettes
- Samurai International Ladies 43-0 RC The Bassets
- Czech Republic 26-10 Pink Ba- ba's
- Susies Valkyries 38-7 Norwegian Raiderettes
- Samurai International Ladies 62-0 Czech Republic
- Pink Ba- ba's 26-7 Norwegian Raiderettes
- Susies Valkyries 17-21 RC The Bassets

Wooden Spoon semi-finals

- Pink Ba- ba's 19-5 Sabbie Mobili
- Norwegian Raiderettes 26-5 Moody Cows

Wooden Spoon final

- Pink Ba- ba's 5-15 Norwegian Raiderettes

Semi-finals

- Samurai 45-0 Corsolettes
- Germany 0-59 Wooden Spoon

Final

- Samurai 22-10 Wooden Spoon

== 2010 ==
22–23 May

Pool 1

Nation	Won	Drawn	Lost	For	Against
Olymp (KAZ)	3	1	0	109	14
Casale (ITA)	3	0	1	87	38
Finland	2	0	2	41	74
Susies Valkyries (INT)	1	0	3	46	94
Thor (NED)	0	1	3	36	99

- Casale 19-19 Thor
- Olymp 26-0 Finland
- Susies Valkyries 29-12 Thor
- Casale 26-5 Finland
- Olymp 35-0 Susies Valkyries
- Finland 17-5 Thor
- Casale 28-0 Susies Valkyries
- Olymp 34-0 Thor
- Susies Valkyries 17-19 Finland
- Olymp 14-14 Casale

Pool 2

Nation	Won	Drawn	Lost	For	Against
Spain	4	0	0	161	5
Gameface Pacific (UK)	3	0	1	129	38
AAC Amsterdam (NED)	2	0	2	62	80
Ravin' Pumas (NED)	1	0	3	12	140
cpopartners.com (ITA)	0	0	4	22	123

- Ravin' Pumas 12 10 cpopartners.com
- AAC Amsterdam 0 33 Spain
- Gameface Pacific 33 0 cpopartners.com
- Ravin' Pumas 0 50 Spain
- AAC Amsterdam 5 35 Gameface Pacific
- Spain 45 0 cpopartners.com
- Ravin' Pumas 0 56 Gameface Pacific
- AAC Amsterdam 33 12 cpopartners.com
- Gameface Pacific 5 33 Spain
- AAC Amsterdam 24 0 Ravin' Pumas

Pool 3

Nation	Won	Drawn	Lost	For	Against
WOP (NED)	4	0	0	194	7
Germany	3	0	1	130	54
Last Minute (NED)	2	0	2	66	71
RC The Bassets (NED)	1	0	3	45	116
Valsugana Rugby Padova (ITA)	0	0	4	12	199

- Germany 22-7 Last Minute
- WOP 45-0 RC The Bassets ladies
- Valsugana Rugby Padova 5-42 Last Minute
- Germany 47-5 RC The Bassets
- WOP 70-0 Valsugana Rugby Padova
- RC The Bassets 7-17 Last Minute
- Germany 54-0 Valsugana Rugby Padova
- WOP 37-0 Last Minute
- Valsugana Rugby Padova 7-33 RC The Bassets
- WOP 42-7 Germany

Plate quarter-finals

- Ravin' Pumas 12-14 RC The Bassets
- Susies Valkyries 35-0 Valsugana Rugby Padova
- cpopartners.com 12-26 Thor

Plate semi-finals

- Finland 38-0 RC The Bassets
- Susies Valkyries 27-0 Thor

Plate final

- Finland 14-12 Susies Valkyries

Cup Pool 1

Nation	Won	Drawn	Lost	For	Against
WOP	3	0	0	114	5
Casale	2	0	1	50	57
Gameface Pacific	1	0	2	35	69
Last Minute	0	0	3	17	85

- Casale 19-14 Gameface Pacific
- WOP 38-0 Last Minute
- Casale 26-5 Last Minute
- WOP 38-0 Gameface Pacific
- Gameface Pacific 21-12 Last Minute
- WOP 38-5 Casale

Cup Pool 2

Nation	Won	Drawn	Lost	For	Against
Spain	3	0	0	102	17
Olymp	2	0	1	72	45
Germany	1	0	2	32	45
AAC Amsterdam	0	0	3	14	113

- Olymp 17-5 Germany
- Spain 48-0 AAC Amsterdam
- Olymp 50-7 AAC Amsterdam
- Spain 21-12 Germany
- Germany 15-7 AAC Amsterdam
- Spain 33-5 Olymp

Cup semi-finals

- WOP 38-5 Olymp
- Spain 33-0 Casale

Cup final

- WOP 19-5 Spain

== 2011 ==
21–22 May

DAY ONE - 21 May

Pool 1

Nation	Won	Drawn	Lost	For	Against
Netherlands	3	0	0	138	0
Portugal	2	0	1	64	36
Susies Valkyries (INT)	1	0	2	36	85
Poland	0	0	3	5	122

- Portugal 26-5 Susies Valkyries
- Netherlands 53-0 Poland
- Portugal 38-0 Poland
- Netherlands 54-0 Susies Valkyries
- Susies Valkyries 31-5 Poland
- Netherlands 31-0 Portugal

Pool 2

Nation	Won	Drawn	Lost	For	Against
Spain	3	0	0	106	10
Brazil	2	0	1	72	20
AAC Amsterdam (NED)	1	0	2	24	90
Richmond Heavettes (ENG)	0	0	3	5	87

- Brazil 40-0 AAC Amsterdam
- Spain 41-0 Richmond Heavettes
- Brazil 22-0 Richmond Heavettes
- Spain 45-0 AAC Amsterdam
- AAC Amsterdam 24-5 Richmond Heavettes
- Spain 20-10 Brazil

Pool 3

Nation	Won	Drawn	Lost	For	Against
Canada	3	0	0	85	7
Germany	2	0	1	116	38
Rugbyende Utrechtse Studente (NED)	1	0	2	24	104
OA Saints (ENG)	0	0	3	5	158

- OA Saints 0-57 Germany
- Canada 47-0 Rugbyende Utrechtse Studente
- OA Saints 5-24 Rugbyende Utrechtse Studente
- Canada 38-7 Germany
- Canada 77-0 OA Saints
- Germany 52-0 Rugbyende Utrechtse Studente

Pool 4

Nation	Won	Drawn	Lost	For	Against
Samurai (INT)	3	0	0	88	7
Netherlands Development	2	0	1	96	24
Georgia	1	0	2	31	69
Gameface Norwegian Vikingettes (NOR)	0	0	3	12	127

- Samurai 24-0 Netherlands Development
- Gameface Norwegian Vikingettes 12-24 Georgia
- Samurai 42-0 Gameface Norwegian Vikingettes
- Netherlands Development 35-0 Georgia
- Samurai 22-7 Georgia
- Netherlands Development 61-0 Gameface Norwegian Vikingettes

Pool 5

Nation	Won	Drawn	Lost	For	Against
Olymp (KAZ)	3	0	0	84	12
Wooden Spoon (INT)	2	0	1	94	15
Rugbyverbandes Baden-Württemberg (GER)	1	0	2	17	95
Belgium	0	0	3	0	73

- Wooden Spoon 30-0 Belgium
- Olymp 43-0 Rugbyverbandes Baden-Württemberg
- Wooden Spoon 52_0 Rugbyverbandes Baden-Württemberg
- Olymp 26-0 Belgium
- Olymp 15-12 Wooden Spoon
- Belgium 0-17 Rugbyverbandes Baden-Württemberg

Pool 6

Nation	Won	Drawn	Lost	For	Against
Esprit (FRA)	2	1	0	130	17
Italy	2	1	0	114	19
Thorburg (NED)	1	0	2	36	138
Billa-Bonn Pandas (GER)	0	0	3	15	121

- Italy 12-12 Esprit
- Thorburg 29-10 Billa-Bonn Pandas
- Italy 54-7 Thorburg
- Esprit 44-5 Billa-Bonn Pandas
- Italy 48-0 Billa-Bonn Pandas
- Esprit 74-0 Thorburg

Pool 7

- Castricum 14-22 Raving Pumas

DAY TWO - 22 May

Plate/Bowl round

- Susies Valkyries (bye)
- Gameface Norwegian Vikingettes 22-5 Richmond Heavettes
- Rugbyende Utrechtse Studente 0-28 Belgium
- Castricum 0-12 AAC Amsterdam
- Georgia (bye)
- Rugbyverbandes Baden-Württemberg 34-0 OA Saints
- Billa-Bonn Pandas 0-38 Poland
- Thorburg (bye)

PLATE (13th-20th)

Plate quarter-finals

- Susies Valkyries 26-0 Gameface Norwegian Vikingettes
- Belgium 10-7 AAC Amsterdam
- Georgia 12-17 Rugbyverbandes Baden-Württemberg
- Poland 21-24 Thorburg

Plate semi-finals

- Susies Valkyries 31-7 Belgium
- Rugbyverbandes Baden-Württemberg 19-5 Thorburg

Plate final

- Susies Valkyrie 36-0 Rugbyverbandes Baden-Württemberg

BOWL (21st-28th)

Bowl quarter-finals

- Richmond Heavettes (bye)
- Rugbyende Utrechtse Studente 12-24 Castricum
- OA Saints (bye)
- Billa-Bonn Pandas (bye)

Bowl semi-finals

- Richmond Heavettes 24-5 Castricum
- OA Saints 26-20 Billa-Bonn Pandas

Bowl final

- Richmond Heavettes 40-0 OA Saints

CUP (1st-12th)

Cup Pool 1

Nation	Won	Drawn	Lost	For	Against
Spain	2	0	0	47	12
Wooden Spoon	1	0	1	38	28
Germany	0	0	2	19	64

- Germany 7-38 Wooden Spoon
- Spain 21-0 Wooden Spoon
- Spain 26-12 Germany

Cup Pool 2

Nation	Won	Drawn	Lost	For	Against
Samurai	2	0	0	55	12
Olymp	1	0	1	20	33
Portugal	0	0	2	14	44

- Olymp 15-7 Portugal
- Samurai 29-7 Portugal
- Samurai 26-5 Olymp

Cup Pool 3

Nation	Won	Drawn	Lost	For	Against
Canada	2	0	0	57	12
Esprit	1	0	1	7	29
Brazil	0	0	2	15	57

- Esprit 7-29 Canada
- Brazil 5-28 Canada
- Esprit 10-29 Brazil

Cup Pool 4

Nation	Won	Drawn	Lost	For	Against
Netherlands	2	0	0	46	12
Italy	1	0	1	33	12
Netherlands Development	0	0	2	5	60

- Italy 26-0 Netherlands Development
- Netherlands 34-5 Netherlands Development
- Netherlands 12-7 Italy

Cup semi-finals

- Spain 0-15 Samurai
- Canada 26-19 Netherlands

Cup final

- Samurai 12-31 Canada

== 2012 ==
Silver Pier Tournament

DAY ONE

Group A

Nation	Won	Drawn	Lost	For	Against
United States	3	0	0	79	24
England	2	0	1	52	12
South Africa	0	1	2	24	64
Wales	0	1	2	17	72

- United States 26-12 South Africa
- England 19-0 Wales
- United States 41-5 Wales
- England 26-0 South Africa
- England 7-12 United States
- South Africa 12-12 Wales

Group B

Nation	Won	Drawn	Lost	For	Against
Canada	3	0	0	67	12
Spain	2	0	1	45	29
Ireland	1	0	2	24	46
France	0	0	3	22	71

- Spain 19-10 France
- Canada 15-5 Ireland
- Spain 19-0 Ireland
- Canada 33-0 France
- Canada 19-7 Spain
- France 12-19 Ireland

Group C

Nation	Won	Drawn	Lost	For	Against
Australia	3	0	0	63	10
Netherlands	2	0	1	46	14
Scotland	1	0	2	19	55
Germany	0	0	3	10	59

- Netherlands 21-0 Germany
- Australia 30-0 Scotland
- Netherlands 20-0 Scotland
- Australia 19-5 Germany
- Australia 14-5 Netherlands
- Germany 5-19 Scotland

DAY TWO

Cup: Pool A

Nation	Won	Drawn	Lost	For	Against
USA	1	1	0	17	16
Australia	1	0	1	25	22
Spain	0	1	1	19	22

- USA 15 Australia 14
- Spain 7 Australia 10
- USA 12 Spain 12

Cup: Pool B

Nation	Won	Drawn	Lost	For	Against
Canada	1	1	0	36	19
Netherlands	1	0	1	24	24
England	0	1	1	12	29

- Netherlands 17 England 0
- Netherlands 7 Canada 24
- England 12 Canada 12

Plate: Pool A

Nation	Won	Drawn	Lost	For	Against
Ireland	2	0	0	43	12
Wales	1	0	1	12	31
Germany	0	0	2	17	29

- Wales 12 Germany 5
- Ireland 17 Germany 12
- Ireland 26 Wales 0

Plate: Pool B

Nation	Won	Drawn	Lost	For	Against
France	2	2	0	43	0
Scotland	1	0	1	14	36
South Africa	0	0	2	5	19

- Scotland 7 South Africa 5
- Scotland 7 France 31
- France 12 South Africa 0

11th/12th place

- Germany 21-0 South Africa

9th/10th place

- Wales 0-12 Scotland

7th/8th place

- Ireland 7-5 France

5th/6th place

- Spain 12-18 England

3rd/4th place

- Australia 15-14 Netherlands

Cup Final: 1st/2nd place

- USA 17-26 Canada

Shield Tournament

DAY ONE - 21 May

Pool 1

Nation	Won	Drawn	Lost	For	Against
Blackrock	3	0	0	82	17
Switzerland	2	0	1	38	41
Red T's	1	0	2	33	52
Finland	0	0	3	17	60

- Blackrock 22-5 Finland
- Switzerland 14-7 Red T's
- Blackrock 31-5 Red T's
- Switzerland 17-5 Finland
- Finland 7-21 Red T's
- Switzerland 7-20 Blackrock

Pool 2

Nation	Won	Drawn	Lost	For	Against
Susies Sevens	3	0	0	76	40
Netherlands Development	2	0	1	61	31
Thor	2	0	1	35	43
Danish Vikings	0	0	3	17	75

- Susies Sevens 33-5 Danish Vikings
- Netherlands Development 19-0 Thor
- Susies Sevens 17-21 Thor
- Netherlands Development 28-5 Danish Vikings
- Danish Vikings 7-14 Thor
- Netherlands Development 14-26 Susies Sevens

Pool 3

Nation	Won	Drawn	Lost	For	Against
Poland	3	0	0	50	27
Castricum	2	0	1	53	17
Lorraine	1	0	2	41	53
Dambusters Thistles Squadron	0	0	3	17	64

- Dambusters Thistles Squadron 5-26 Lorraine
- Poland 12-5 Castricum
- Dambusters Thistles Squadron 0-24 Castricum
- Poland 24-10 Lorraine
- Lorraine 5-24 Castricum
- Poland 14-12 Dambusters Thistles Squadron

Pool 4

Nation	Won	Drawn	Lost	For	Against
RBW Frauen	3	0	0	72	0
Austria	2	0	1	56	29
AAC Rugby	1	0	2	25	38
Wildcats	0	0	3	0	66

- Austria 14-5 AAC Rugby
- Wildcats 0-24 RBW Frauen
- Austria 42-0 Wildcats
- AAC Rugby 0-24 RBW Frauen
- Austria 0-24 RBW Frauen
- AAC Rugby 20-0 Wildcats

DAY TWO

Pool A

Nation	Won	Drawn	Lost	For	Against
Blackrock	2	0	0	56	0
Thor	1	0	1	29	24
Austria	0	0	2	12	73

- Austria 12-29 Thor
- Blackrock 12-0 Thor
- Blackrock 44-0 Austria

Pool B

Nation	Won	Drawn	Lost	For	Against
Switzerland	2	0	0	43	0
RBW Frauen	1	0	1	26	31
Lorraine	0	0	2	0	38

- Switzerland 12-0 Lorraine
- RBW Frauen 26-0 Lorraine
- RBW Frauen 0-31 Switzerland

Pool C

Nation	Won	Drawn	Lost	For	Against
Netherlands Development	2	0	0	50	5
Poland	1	0	1	29	36
AAC Rugby	0	0	2	10	48

- Netherlands Development 19-5 AAC Rugby
- AAC Rugby 5-29 Poland
- Poland 0-31 Netherlands Development

Pool D

Nation	Won	Drawn	Lost	For	Against
Susie's Sevens	2	0	0	59	17
Castricum	1	0	1	26	29
Red T's	0	0	2	15	54

- Castricum 19-5 Red T's
- Susie's Sevens 35-10 Red T's
- Susie's Sevens 24-7 Castricum

Semi-finals

- Blackrock 19-12 Susie's Sevens
- Switzerland 12-22 Netherlands Development

Final

- Blackrock 7-12 Netherlands Development

== 2013 ==
=== IRB Women's Sevens World Series ===
17–18 May 2013

Group A

Nation	Won	Drawn	Lost	For	Against
New Zealand	3	0	0	56	5
Russia	2	0	1	58	17
Netherlands	1	0	2	19	37
China	0	0	3	0	74

- New Zealand 17-5 Russia
- Netherlands 19-0 China
- New Zealand 24-0 China
- Netherlands 0-22 Russia
- New Zealand 15-0 Netherlands
- Russia 31-0 China

Group B

Nation	Won	Drawn	Lost	For	Against
England	3	0	0	43	19
France	2	0	1	27	31
Canada	1	0	2	43	29
South Africa	0	0	3	33	67

- England 17-14 South Africa
- Canada 7-8 France
- England 12-5 France
- Canada 36-7 South Africa
- Canada 0-14 England
- France 14-12 South Africa

Plate Semi Finals (5th-8th)

- Spain 15-5 Australia
- France 7-10 United States

7th/8th Match

- Australia 14-12 France

Plate final: 5th/6th Match

- Spain 12-17 United States

Group C

Nation	Won	Drawn	Lost	For	Against
United States	3	0	0	51	10
Australia	2	0	1	60	15
Spain	1	0	2	36	48
Brazil	0	0	3	0	74

- Australia 31-5 Spain
- United States 24-0 Brazil
- Australia 24-0 Brazil
- United States 17-5 Spain
- Australia 5-10 United States
- Spain 26-0 Brazil

Bowl Semi Finals (9th-12th)

- Netherlands 31-0 Brazil
- South Africa 19-7 China

11th/12th Match

- Brazil 12-26 China

Bowl final:9th/10th Match

- Netherlands 32-0 South Africa

Quarter-finals (1st-8th)

- New Zealand 14-5 Spain
- Australia 10-19 Russia
- England 19-0 France
- United States 5-19 Canada

Cup Semi Finals (1st-4th)

- New Zealand 24-10 Russia
- England 7-12 Canada

3rd/4th place

- Russia 26-5 England

Cup Final: 1st/2nd place

- New Zealand 33-24 Canada

=== Women's Shield ===
18–19 May 2013

Day one

Group A

Nation	Won	Drawn	Lost	For	Against
Belgium	3	0	0	84	22
Georgia	2	0	1	40	29
Czech Republic	1	0	2	34	39
Tabusoro	0	0	3	5	83

- Belgium 22-5 Czech Republic
- Georgia 21-0 Tabusoro
- Czech Republic 24-10 Tabusoro
- Belgium 24-12 Georgia
- Georgia 7-5 Czech Republic
- Belgium 38-5 Tabusoro

Group B

Nation	Won	Drawn	Lost	For	Against
Germany	2	0	0	55	14
Paname Utd	1	0	1	42	19
Lorraine	0	0	2	0	64

- Paname Utd 28-0 Lorraine
- Germany 36-0 Lorraine
- Germany 19-14 Paname Utd

Group C

Nation	Won	Drawn	Lost	For	Against
Ukraine	2	0	0	60	0
Blackrock College	1	0	1	7	31
Netherlands Dev.	0	0	2	0	36

- Netherlands Dev. 0-7 Blackrock College
- Blackrock College 0-31 Ukraine
- Netherlands Dev. 0-29 Ukraine

Group D

Nation	Won	Drawn	Lost	For	Against
Switzerland	2	0	0	48	12
Susies 7s	1	0	1	26	29
AAC Dames	0	0	2	12	45

- Susies 7s 21-5 AAC Dames
- AAC Dames 7-24 Switzerland
- Switzerland 24-5 Susies 7s

Day two

Group E

Nation	Won	Drawn	Lost	For	Against
Ukraine	2	0	0	51	12
Georgia	1	0	1	38	22
Lorraine	0	0	2	0	55

- Ukraine 29-0 Lorraine
- Georgia 26-0 Lorraine
- Georgia 12-22 Ukraine

Group F

Nation	Won	Drawn	Lost	For	Against
Germany	2	0	0	42	7
Netherlands Dev.	1	0	1	19	21
Blackrock College	0	0	2	14	47

- Germany 14-0 Netherlands Dev.
- Netherlands Dev. 19-7 Blackrock College
- Germany 28-7 Blackrock College

Group G

Nation	Won	Drawn	Lost	For	Against
Belgium	2	0	0	58	0
AAC Dames	1	0	1	15	45
Susies 7s	0	0	2	14	42

- Belgium 31-0 AAC Dames
- AAC Dames 15-14 Susies 7s
- Belgium 27-0 Susies 7s

Group H

Nation	Won	Drawn	Lost	For	Against
Paname Utd	2	0	0	70	0
Switzerland	1	0	1	24	50
Czech Republic	0	0	2	7	51

- Switzerland 24-7 Czech Republic
- Paname Utd 27-0 Czech Republic
- Switzerland 0-43 Paname Utd

Semi Finals

- Ukraine 27-0 Paname Utd
- Germany 19-14 Belgium

Final

- Ukraine 36-0 Germany

== 2014 ==
=== IRB Women's Sevens World Series ===
16–17 May 2014

Group A

Nation	Won	Drawn	Lost	For	Against
New Zealand	3	0	0	90	19
United States	2	0	1	75	43
Spain	1	0	2	24	72
Ireland	0	0	3	21	76

- New Zealand 43-7 United States
- Spain 19-14 Ireland
- New Zealand 28-7 Ireland
- Spain 0-39 United States
- New Zealand 19-5 Spain
- United States 29-0 Ireland

Group B

Nation	Won	Drawn	Lost	For	Against
Australia	3	0	0	89	17
Russia	2	0	1	44	51
France	1	0	2	41	43
South Africa	0	0	3	12	75

- Australia 24-5 France
- Russia 20-5 South Africa
- Australia 29-7 South Africa
- Russia 19-10 France
- Australia 36-5 Russia
- France 26-0 South Africa

Plate Semi Finals (5th-8th)

- Brazil 0-34 United States
- France 0-24 Russia

7th/8th Match

- Brazil 5-14 France

Plate final: 5th/6th Match

- United States 27-12 Russia

Group C

Nation	Won	Drawn	Lost	For	Against
England	3	0	0	65	15
Canada	2	0	1	54	15
Brazil	1	0	2	10	47
Netherlands	0	0	3	10	62

- Canada 28-0 Brazil
- England 36-5 Netherlands
- Canada 21-5 Netherlands
- England 19-5 Brazil
- Canada 5-10 England
- Brazil 5-0 Netherlands

Bowl Semi Finals (9th-12th)

- Spain 12-26 South Africa
- Netherlands 24-0 Ireland

11th/12th Match

- Spain 5-7 Ireland

Bowl final:9th/10th Match

- South Africa 7-29 Netherlands

Quarter-finals (1st-8th)

- Australia 33-0 Brazil
- Canada 28-19 United States
- England 7-0 France
- New Zealand 36-0 Russia

Cup Semi Finals (1st-4th)

- Australia 17-0 Canada
- England 10-26 New Zealand

3rd/4th place

- Canada 10-0 England

Cup Final: 1st/2nd place

- Australia 12-29 New Zealand

=== Women's Shield ===
17–18 May 2014 Results for national teams:

Georgia:

- SATURDAY 17-05-2014
- DUKKIES (NL) W 21-12
- Brasil Women's 7s Development Team L 0-24
- Lorraine (FR) W 14-5

SUNDAY 18-05-2014

- Wales Dragon's L 0-41
- Germany L 0-19

Germany:

- SATURDAY 17-05-2014
- Utrecht Dames W 33-7
- Dambusters Ladies W 36-7
- FRANCE DEVELOPMENT L 0-19

SUNDAY 18-05-2014

- Georgia Ladies W 19-0
- Wales Dragon's L 0-24

NORWEGIAN VIKINGETTES SATURDAY 17-05-2014

- Green Lightning (IRE) 12-0
- Susies Sevens 0-24
- AAC Amsterdam Ladies 0-17

SUNDAY 18-05-2014

- Saxons Ladies 33-5
- Utrecht Dames 0-19

POLAND 7'S LADIES SATURDAY 17-05-2014

- Dutchband's Paarse Rebellen 12-14
- Blackrock College RFC, Ireland 10-24
- WEST COAST VIKINGS 5-27

SUNDAY 18-05-2014

- Switzerland 19-7
- DUKKIES 19-0
- Netherlands Development 7-24 SF plate

SWITZERLAND SATURDAY 17-05-2014

- Orbital Dutch lions 5-19
- Saxons Ladies 28-5
- Wales Dragon's 5-45

SUNDAY 18-05-2014

- Poland 7's Ladies 7-19
- DUKKIES 31-12

WALES DRAGON'S SATURDAY 17-05-2014

- Saxons Ladies 39-0
- Orbital Dutch lions 26-7
- Switzerland 45-5

SUNDAY 18-05-2014

- Georgia Ladies 41-0
- Germany 24-0
- FRANCE University 10-0 SF
- Tribe7s 5-40 (AUS) FINAL

== 2015 ==
=== Women's Silver Pier ===
DAY ONE - 23 May

Pool 1

Nation	Won	Drawn	Lost	For	Against
Ireland	3	0	0	151	0
Suomi (Finland)	2	0	1	67	50
Norwegian Vikingettes	1	0	2	45	74
Ushizi Warriors	0	0	3	10	149

- Norwegian Vikingettes 0-17 Suomi 7's Ladies
- Irish National Women's Seven's 54-0 Ushizi Warriors
- Norwegian Vikingettes 45-5 Ushizi Warriors
- Irish National Women's Seven's 45-0 Suomi 7's Ladies
- Suomi 7's Ladies 50-5 Ushizi Warriors
- Irish National Women's Seven's 52-0 Norwegian Vikingettes

Pool 2

Nation	Won	Drawn	Lost	For	Against
Germany	3	0	0	102	7
Poland	2	0	1	82	14
RK 03 Berlin	1	0	2	24	88
Dambusters Ladies	0	0	3	10	109

- Poland 7s 26-0 Dambusters Ladies
- Germany 29-0 RK 03 Berlin
- Poland 7s 49-0 RK 03 Berlin
- Germany 59-0 Dambusters Ladies
- Dambusters Ladies 10-24 RK 03 Berlin
- Germany 14-7 Poland 7s

Pool 3

Nation	Won	Drawn	Lost	For	Against
Wales	3	0	0	181	0
Czech Republic	2	0	1	45	75
Paarse Rebellen	1	0	2	38	59
Movers n Shaikhas	0	0	3	0	130

- National team of Czech Republic 26-0 Movers n Shaikhas
- Wales Women 40-0 Paarse Rebellen
- National team of Czech Republic 19-12 Paarse Rebellen
- Wales Women 78-0 Movers n Shaikhas
- Movers n Shaikhas 0-26 Paarse Rebellen
- Wales Women 63-0 National team of Czech Republic

Pool 4

Nation	Won	Drawn	Lost	For	Against
Maple Leafs	3	0	0	112	12
Susies	2	0	1	47	31
Paris	1	0	2	31	65
Georgia	0	0	3	5	87

- Georgia Ladies 0 20 Susies Ladies
- Maple Leafs 38 7 Paris Ladies Sevens
- Georgia Ladies 5 17 Paris Ladies Sevens
- Maple Leafs 24 5 Susies Ladies
- Susies Ladies 22 7 Paris Ladies Sevens
- Maple Leafs 50 0 Georgia Ladies

Pool 5

Nation	Won	Drawn	Lost	For	Against
France Development Feminin	3	0	0	146	0
Vixens	2	0	1	40	67
Romania	1	0	2	26	55
NRV Development 7s	0	0	3	10	149

- Romania 12-19 Vixens
- France Development Feminin 70-0 NRV 7s
- Romania 14-5 NRV 7s
- France Development Feminin 45-0 Vixens
- France Development Feminin 31-0 Romania
- Vixens 21-10 NRV 7s

Pool 6

Nation	Won	Drawn	Lost	For	Against
Tribe	3	0	0	143	7
Switzerland	2	0	1	52	42
AAC	1	0	2	35	77
Dukkies	0	0	3	17	121

- Swiss Women's 7's Rugby 21-0 Dukkies
- Tribe7s 36-0 AAC Ladies
- Swiss Women's 7's Rugby 24-10 AAC Ladies
- Tribe7s 75-0 Dukkies
- Dukkies 17-25 AAC Ladies
- Tribe7s 32-7 Swiss Women's 7's Rugby

Pool 7

Nation	Won	Drawn	Lost	For	Against
Amazonas (Brazil Development)	3	0	0	65	25
West Coast Vikings	2	0	1	32	22
RC The Bassets	1	0	2	32	27
Windmills	0	0	3	5	60

- West Coast Vikings 12-0 Windmills
- Amazonas 17-10 RC The Bassets
- West Coast Vikings 10-5 RC The Bassets
- Amazonas 31-5 Windmills
- Windmills 0-17 RC The Bassets
- Amazonas 17-10 West Coast Vikings

Pool 8

Nation	Won	Drawn	Lost	For	Against
Wooden Spoon Marauders	3	0	0	108	17
Scottish Select	2	0	1	105	17
Lorraine	1	0	2	46	82
Georgia	0	0	3	0	143

- Scottish Select 40-0 Helvetian Hawkbit Sevens
- Wooden Spoon Marauders 34-0 LORRAINE
- Scottish Select 48-0 LORRAINE
- Wooden Spoon Marauders 57-0 Helvetian Hawkbit Sevens
- Helvetian Hawkbit Sevens 0-46 LORRAINE
- Wooden Spoon Marauders 17-17 Scottish Select

DAY TWO

Pool 1

Nation	Won	Drawn	Lost	For	Against
Wales	3	0	0	93	17
Wooden Spoon	2	0	1	45	44
Vixens	1	0	2	53	75
Susies	0	0	3	38	93

- Wooden Spoon Marauders 24-5 Susies Ladies
- Wales Women 33-5 Vixens
- Wooden Spoon Marauders 21-17 Vixens
- Wales Women 38-12 Susies Ladies
- Susies Ladies 21-31 Vixens
- Wales Women 22-0 Wooden Spoon Marauders

Pool 2

Nation	Won	Drawn	Lost	For	Against
France Developpement Feminin	3	0	0	65	7
Germany	2	0	1	69	28
West Coast Vikings	1	0	2	29	52
Suomi (Finland)	0	0	3	7	83

- Germany 36-0 Suomi 7's Ladies
- DEVELOPPEMENT FEMININ 12-7 West Coast Vikings
- Germany 33-7 West Coast Vikings
- DEVELOPPEMENT FEMININ 32-0 Suomi 7's Ladies
- Suomi 7's Ladies 7-15 West Coast Vikings
- DEVELOPPEMENT FEMININ 21-0 Germany

Pool 3

Nation	Won	Drawn	Lost	For	Against
Maple Leafs	3	0	0	132	31
Tribe	2	0	1	88	26
Czech Republic	1	0	2	36	102
Poland	0	0	3	10	107

- Maple Leafs 57-0 Poland 7s
- Tribe7s 43-0 National team of Czech Republic
- Maple Leafs 54-12 National team of Czech Republic
- Tribe7s 26-5 Poland 7s
- Poland 7s 5-24 National team of Czech Republic
- Tribe7s 19-21 Maple Leafs

Pool 4

Nation	Won	Drawn	Lost	For	Against
Ireland	3	0	0	112	0
Scottish Select	2	0	1	20	50
Amazonas	1	0	2	31	41
Switzerland	0	0	3	5	77

- Amazonas 7-10 Scottish Select
- Irish National Women's Seven's 43-0 Swiss Women's 7's Rugby
- Amazonas 24-0 Swiss Women's 7's Rugby
- Irish National Women's Seven's 38-0 Scottish Select
- Scottish Select 10-5 Swiss Women's 7's Rugby
- Irish National Women's Seven's 31-0 Amazonas

Semi-finals

- Ireland 19-14 Wales
- Maple Leafs 12-7 France Developpement

Final Ireland 14-26 Maple Leafs

International results in Shield competition

- Norway 5-7 Georgia
- Romania 15-12 Georgia
- Norway 7-39 Romania

Shield final

- Windmills 22-12 Romania

=== World Rugby Women's Sevens Series ===
22–23 May 2015
