= 2014 Rugby Europe Women's Sevens Grand Prix Series =

- Hosts: Russia; France
- Date: 7–15 June 2014
- Nations: 12

Final positions
- Champions: Russia
- Runners-up: France
- Third: England

2014 Rugby Europe Women's Sevens Grand Prix Series was the top level of international women's rugby sevens competitions organised by Rugby Europe during 2014. The series featured two tournaments, one hosted in Moscow and one hosted in Brive-la-Gaillarde. England won the Moscow tournament while France won the Brive tournament. Russia won the overall championship after finishing as runners-up in both tournaments.

== Moscow ==
Moscow Tournament
- Host nation: Russia
- Date: 7–8 June 2014

Cup
- Champion: England
- Runner-up: Russia
- Third: Netherlands

Plate
- Winner: France
- Runner-up: Spain

Bowl
- Winner: Wales
- Runner-up: Belgium

=== Pool stages ===
==== Group A ====
Nation	Won	Drawn	Lost	For	Against
Russia	3	0	0	87	0
Netherlands	2	0	1	79	22
Italy	1	0	2	29	53
Sweden	0	0	3	12	132

- Russia 53-0 Sweden
- Italy 0-29 Netherlands
- Russia 22-0 Netherlands
- Italy 29-12 Sweden
- Netherlands 50-0 Sweden
- Russia 12-0 Italy

==== Group B ====
Nation	Won	Drawn	Lost	For	Against
England	3	0	0	102	12
Portugal	1	0	2	24	43
Ireland	1	0	2	34	59
Belgium	1	0	2	27	70

- England 41-0 Belgium
- Ireland 7-10 Portugal
- England 24-7 Portugal
- Ireland 22-15 Belgium
- Portugal 7-12 Belgium
- England 34-5 Ireland

==== Group C ====
Nation	Won	Drawn	Lost	For	Against
France	3	0	0	91	12
Spain	2	0	1	71	22
Wales	1	0	2	33	69
Germany	0	0	3	21	113

- France 52-0 Germany
- Spain 26-5 Wales
- France 29-7 Wales
- Spain 40-7 Germany
- Wales 21-14 Germany
- France 10-5 Spain

=== Knockout stage ===
==== Bowl ====
Semi-finals (9th-12th)

- Wales 38-0 Sweden
- Belgium 10-5 Germany

11th/12th Match

- Sweden 0-57 Germany

Final:9th/10th Match

- Wales 14-0 Belgium

==== Plate ====
Semi-finals (5th-8th)

- Ireland 7-12 Spain
- Italy 0-45 France

7th/8th Match

- Ireland 31-0 Italy

Final: 5th/6th Match

- Spain 0-19 France

==== Cup ====
Quarter-finals (1st-8th)

- England 29-0 Ireland
- Russia 36-7 Italy
- France 7-8 Portugal
- Netherlands 19-0 Spain

Semi-finals (1st-4th)

- England 21-5 Netherlands
- Russia 41-0 Portugal

3rd/4th place

- Netherlands 10-7 Portugal

Cup Final: 1st/2nd place

- England 24-20 Russia

== Brive ==
Brive Tournament
- Host nation: France
- Date: 14–15 June 2014

Cup
- Champion: France
- Runner-up: Russia
- Third: Netherlands

Plate
- Winner: England
- Runner-up: Portugal

Bowl
- Winner: Wales
- Runner-up: Belgium

=== Pool stages ===
==== Group A ====
Nation	Won	Drawn	Lost	For	Against
France	3	0	0	65	7
England	2	0	1	73	31
Germany	1	0	2	28	52
Wales	0	0	3	7	83

- England 33-7 Germany
- France 29-0 Wales
- England 33-7 Wales
- France 19-0 Germany
- Wales 0-21 Germany
- England 7-17 France

==== Group B ====
Nation	Won	Drawn	Lost	For	Against
Russia	2	0	0	91	7
Spain	2	2	0	48	7
Italy	1	0	2	45	67
Sweden	0	0	3	0	103

- Russia 34-0 Sweden
- Spain 17-0 Italy
- Russia 50-7 Italy
- Spain 31-0 Sweden
- Italy 38-0 Sweden
- Russia 7-0 Spain

==== Group C ====
Nation	Won	Drawn	Lost	For	Against
Netherlands	3	0	0	83	10
Portugal	2	0	0	26	29
Belgium	1	0	2	24	52
Ireland	0	0	3	15	57

- Netherlands 33-5 Belgium
- Portugal 12-5 Ireland
- Netherlands 33-5 Ireland
- Portugal 14-7 Belgium
- Ireland 5-12 Belgium
- Netherlands 17-0 Portugal

=== Knockout stage ===
==== Bowl ====
Semi-finals (9th-12th)

- Belgium 43-0 Sweden
- Ireland 0-22 Wales

11th/12th Match

- Sweden 7-19 Ireland

Final: 9th/10th Match

- Wales 38-7 Belgium

==== Plate ====
Semi-finals (5th-8th)

- Germany 0-40 England
- Italy 7-14 Portugal

7th/8th Match

- Germany 5-21 Italy

Final: 5th/6th Match

- England 14-0 Portugal

==== Cup ====
Quarter-finals (1st-8th)

- Russia 38-5 Germany
- Netherlands 29-0 Italy
- France 29-0 Portugal
- England 14-19 Spain

Semi-finals (1st-4th)

- Russia 31-7 Spain
- Netherlands 0-26 France

3rd/4th place

- Spain 10-19 Netherlands

Final: 1st/2nd place

- Russia 12-24 France

== Final standings ==
=== Tournaments ===
Date	Venue	Winner	Runner-up	Third
7–8 June	Moscow, Russia	England	Russia	Netherlands
14–15 June	Brive-la-Gaillarde, France	France	Russia	Netherlands

=== Overall Championship ===
#	Teams	Points
1	Russia	36
2	France	32
3	England	32
4	Netherlands	30
5	Spain	24
6	Portugal	24
7	Italy	13
8	Ireland	9
9	Wales	8
10	Germany	8
11	Belgium	6
12	Sweden	2
