= Fifth Third Stadium =

Stadium in Kennesaw, Georgia, USA

Coordinates: 34.028967°N 84.567626°W

Walens Family Field at Fifth Third Stadium
- "The Fraction"

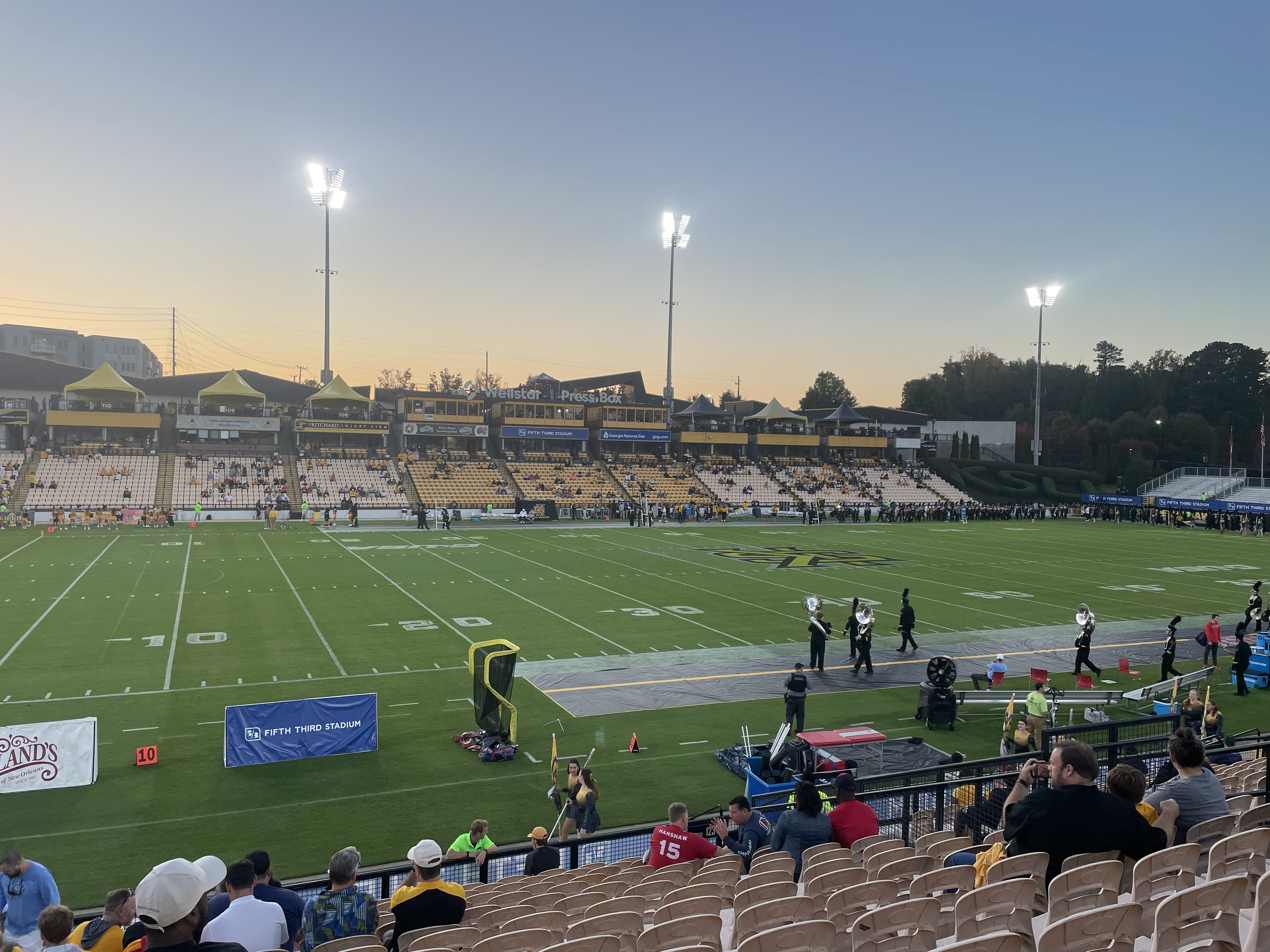
- Fifth Third Stadium in 2024
- Interactive map of Walens Family Field at Fifth Third Stadium
- Full name: Walens Family Field at Fifth Third Stadium
- Former names: KSU Soccer Stadium (2010–2013); Fifth Third Bank Stadium (2013–2023)
- Location: 3200 George Busbee Parkway, Kennesaw, Georgia 30144
- Owner: Kennesaw State University Foundation
- Operator: Kennesaw State University
- Capacity: 10,200
- Surface: PlayMaster hybrid
- Record attendance: 11,040 (Football: Kennesaw State vs. Louisiana; September 7, 2024)

Construction
- Built: 2010
- Opened: May 2, 2010
- Cost: $16.5 million
- Architect: Rossetti Architects

Tenants
- Kennesaw State Owls (NCAA); Women's soccer (2010–present); Women's lacrosse (2013–present); Football (2015–present); Atlanta Beat (WPS) (2010–2011); Atlanta Blaze (MLL) (2016–2018); Atlanta United 2 (MLSNP) (2019–present)

Fifth Third Stadium, known as Kennesaw State University Stadium until 2013, is a stadium near Kennesaw, Georgia, that is primarily used as the home for the Kennesaw State Owls football team as well as the KSU women's soccer and women's lacrosse teams. It was built as a soccer-specific stadium and opened May 2, 2010, with the first match played on May 9. The facility is the result of a public-private partnership between Kennesaw State University and the now-defunct Atlanta Beat of Women's Professional Soccer.

The stadium's seating capacity is 10,200. It has a stage at one end to facilitate concerts and can hold up to 16,316 for that purpose.

== Stadium ==
The stadium, built on 21 acres (85,000 m^{2}) of land about a mile from Kennesaw State’s main campus, is the latest addition to the KSU Sports & Entertainment Park, which opened in fall 2009 to expand the university’s facilities for intramural and club sports. The stadium will help showcase varsity athletics at KSU, which recently completed its transition into NCAA Division I.

The 6.5 acres (26,000 m^{2}) on which the stadium sits is part of 88 acres (360,000 m^{2}) acquired for the university by the KSU Foundation in 2008 and 2009, which are now being developed into athletics facilities for the university’s growing student population. The remaining area around the new stadium has been developed into soccer fields, intramural fields, a rugby field, and a track and nearly 5,000 feet (1,500 m) of nature and hiking trails.

== Football ==
In September 2010, KSU announced that it planned to launch a football program at the Division I FCS level in 2014, and would use the stadium as its home field. On February 14, KSU announced that the Board of Regents of the University System of Georgia approved the University’s request to add football to its 17-sport NCAA Division I intercollegiate athletics program.

On September 12, 2015, Kennesaw State played their first home football game at Fifth Third Bank Stadium with 9,506 in attendance, defeating the Edward Waters Tigers, 58-7.

== Soccer ==
The facility was home to the Atlanta Beat in 2010 and 2011, and hosted the 2010 WPS All-Star Game on June 30. Pro soccer returned when Atlanta United 2 of the USL Championship moved to the stadium for the 2019 season. The stadium hosted a 2019 CONCACAF Champions League match where Atlanta United FC defeated C.S. Herediano 4–0 on February 28, 2019, and a U.S. Open Cup match between Atlanta United and Chattanooga FC on April 20, 2022, which Atlanta won 6–0. Atlanta United have won all eight of the matches the team has played at the stadium.

== Rugby ==
The stadium hosted a round of the 2013–14 IRB Women's Sevens World Series on February 15–16, 2014.

The second half of a home-and-home series of rugby matches between the United States and Uruguay as part of the qualification for the 2015 Rugby World Cup in England, was played here on March 29, 2014. The United States won the match 32–13 to win the qualification spot on a two-match aggregate of 59–40.

The stadium hosted the United States when they played Georgia on June 17, 2017. The Eagles lost to Georgia 17–21.

=== USA Eagles Internationals ===
USA scores displayed first.

Date	Opponents	Final score	Competition	Attendance
29 March 2014	Uruguay	32 – 13	2015 Rugby World Cup qualifying	6,197
17 June 2017	Georgia	17 – 21	2017 June rugby union tests	

== Renovation and renaming ==
Through a multimillion-dollar, multi-year sponsorship agreement with the Fifth Third Bank's Georgia regional office, KSU Stadium was renamed Fifth Third Bank Stadium with the addition of Division I football in February 2013. Campus facility plans in 2016 suggested expanding the stadium's capacity, but as of June 2018, Kennesaw State University had not funded the plan.

== Top 10 attendance records ==
Rank	Attendance	Date	Game Result
1	11,040	September 7, 2024	Kennesaw State 10, Louisiana 34
2	11,040	September 13, 2025	Kennesaw State 27, Merrimack 13
3	11,040	September 27, 2025	Kennesaw State 24, Middle Tennessee 16
4	11,040	October 28, 2025	Kennesaw State 33, UTEP 20
5	11,040	November 22, 2025	Kennesaw State 41, Missouri State 34
6	11,040	September 3, 2026	Kennesaw State 47, West Georgia 0
7	10,847	September 28, 2024	Kennesaw State 13, UT Martin 24
8	10,713	September 20, 2025	Kennesaw State 28, Arkansas State 21
9	10,436	October 7, 2023	Kennesaw State 20, Tennessee State 27
10	10,108	August 31, 2023	Kennesaw State 38, Tusculum 7

== Notes and references ==
Preceded by WakeMed Soccer Park	Host of the Women's College Cup; 2011	Succeeded by Torero Stadium
