= Russia women's national rugby sevens team =

Russia
- Union: Rugby Union of Russia
- Nickname: She-Bears (Медведицы)
- Coach: Andrey Kuzin
- Captain: Alena Mikhaltsova
- Most caps: Baizat Khamidova (163)
- Top scorer: Baizat Khamidova (500)
- Most tries: Baizat Khamidova (100)
Team kit	Change kit

World Cup Sevens
- Appearances: 2 (First in 2009)
- Best result: 7th place, 2013

International medals

Women's rugby sevens

Representing Russia

European Championship
Gold medal – first place	2013 Brive-la-Gaillarde/Marbella	
Gold medal – first place	2014 Moscow/Brive-la-Gaillarde	
Gold medal – first place	2016 Kazan/Mallemort	
Gold medal – first place	2017 Kazan/Mallemort	
Gold medal – first place	2018 Kazan/Marcoussis	
Gold medal – first place	2019 Marcoussis/Kharkiv	
Gold medal – first place	2021 Lisbon/Moscow	
Silver medal – second place	2015 Kazan/Mallemort	
Bronze medal – third place	2008 Limoges	

Universiade
Gold medal – first place	2013 Kazan	

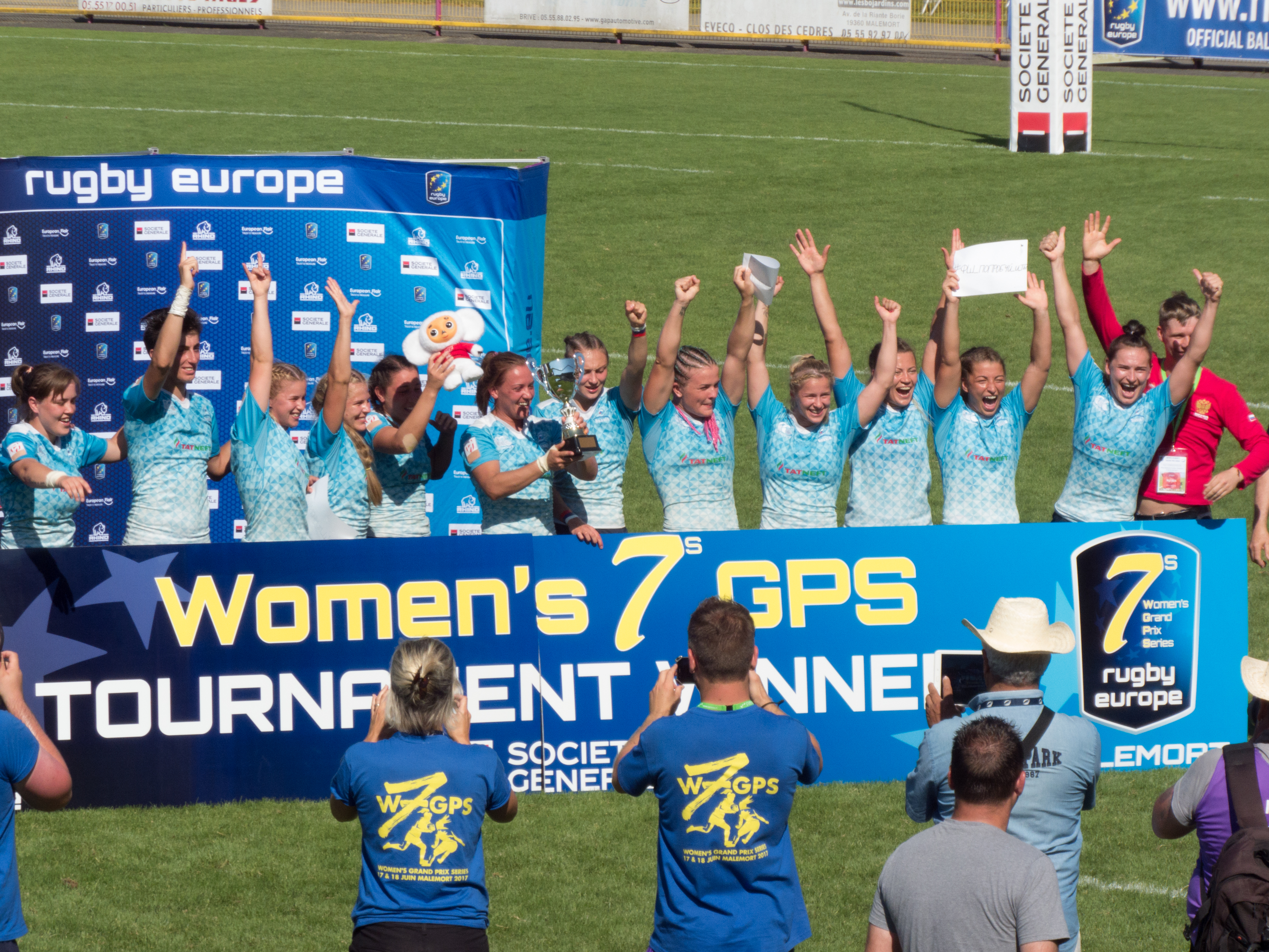
2017 Rugby Europe Women's Sevens champions

The Russian women's national rugby sevens team (Russian: Женская сборная России по регби-7) is a women's rugby team in Europe. Since 2013, it is dominating the European Championships, winning the trophy seven times. Internationally, Russia's best performance was in 2013, finishing in the quarterfinals. The team was runner-up at the 2015 Canada Women's Sevens, after defeating Australia in quarter-finals and France in semifinals.

Russia failed to qualify for the inaugural rugby sevens event in 2016 Summer Olympics; however, they qualified for the following Olympic Games in Tokyo.

After the 2022 Russian invasion of Ukraine, World Rugby and Rugby Europe suspended Russia from international and European continental rugby union competition. In addition, the Rugby Union of Russia was suspended from World Rugby and Rugby Europe.

== Tournament history ==
A red box around the year indicates tournaments played within Russia

=== Summer Olympics record ===
Olympic Games
Year	Round	Position	Pld	W	L	D
(Brazil) 2016	Not Qualified					
(Japan) 2020	Quarterfinals					
(France) 2024	Suspended	8th	6	1	5	0
Total	0 Titles	1/3	6	1	5	0

=== World Cup Sevens record ===
Rugby World Cup Sevens
Year	Round	Position	Pld	W	L	D
(United Arab Emirates) 2009	Knockout Stage	11th	5	2	3	0
(Russia) 2013	Quarterfinals	7th	5	2	2	1
(United States) 2018	Quarterfinals	8th	4	2	2	0
Total	0 Titles	3/3	14	6	7	1

=== World Sevens Series record ===
World Sevens Series
Year	Position	Pld	W	L	D
2012–13	5th	18	12	5	1
2013–14	5th	30	15	13	2
2014–15	7th	35	12	23	0
2015–16	7th	28	13	15	0
2016–17	5th	30	16	14	0
2017–18	6th	28	12	16	0
2018–19	7th	36	13	21	2
2019–20	6th	40	6	13	0
Total	0 Title	245	99	120	5

=== Summer Universiade record ===
Summer Universiade
Year	Round	Pld	W	L	D
(Russia) 2013	1st place, gold medalist(s)	7	7	0	0
(Italy) 2019	3rd place, bronze medalist(s)	5	3	0	2
Total	1 Title	12	10	0	2

=== European Women's Sevens results ===
European Women's Sevens
Year	Position	Pld	W	L	D
(France) 2005	1st	7	7	0	0
(France) 2006	9th	6	4	2	0
(France) 2007	9th	5	1	3	1
(France) 2008	3rd place, bronze medalist(s)	6	5	1	0
(Germany) 2009	7th	6	3	3	0
(Russia) 2010	6th	6	2	3	1
(Romania) 2011	4th	7	5	2	0
2012	4th	13	10	3	0
2013	1st place, gold medalist(s)	14	12	2	0
2014	1st place, gold medalist(s)	11	9	2	0
2015	2nd place, silver medalist(s)	14	13	1	0
2016	1st place, gold medalist(s)	14	11	3	0
2017	1st place, gold medalist(s)	13	13	0	0
2018	1st place, gold medalist(s)	13	12	1	0
2019	1st place, gold medalist(s)	12	11	1	0
2021	1st place, gold medalist(s)	3	3	3	3
2022	Suspended				
2023	Suspended				
2024	Suspended				
2025	Suspended				
2026	Suspended				
2027	Suspended				
Total	16/22	159	130	27	2

== Players ==
=== Award winners ===
The following Russia Sevens players have been recognised at the World Rugby Awards since 2013:

World Rugby Women's 7s Player of the Year
Year	Nominees	Winners
2015	Nadezhda Sozonova	—

=== Team management ===
- Head Coach – Andrey Kuzin
- Assistant Coach and Head of Performance - Graham Bentz
