= Sudamérica Rugby Women's Sevens =

South American women's rugby sevens championship

- Sport: Rugby sevens
- Founded: 2004; 22 years ago
- No. of teams: 10 (2021)
- Countries: Argentina; Brazil; Costa Rica; Guatemala; Uruguay; Chile; Colombia; Panama; Paraguay; Peru
- Most recent champion: Argentina (2024)
- Most titles: Brazil (21 titles)

The Sudamérica Rugby Women's Sevens (formerly known as the CONSUR Women's Sevens), is the regional championship for women's international rugby sevens in South America. It has been contested since 2004. The tournament is held over two days, typically on a weekend. It is sanctioned and sponsored by Sudamérica Rugby.

The South America Women's Sevens Championship was first held in Venezuela in 2004. Since then, the regional 7s championships has periodically served as pre-qualifying competitions for the Rugby World Cup Sevens, the Pan American Games and the Olympic Games.

Colombia won the 2015 tournament and Argentina won their first-ever title in 2023. Brazil has dominated the Sudamérica Women's Sevens, winning 21 tournaments.

== Tournament History ==
=== Results by year ===
Year	Host	Champion	Runner up	Third	Fourth
2004	(Venezuela) Barquisimeto	Brazil	Venezuela	Colombia	Argentina
2005	(Brazil) São Paulo	Brazil	Argentina	Venezuela	Colombia
2007	(Chile) Viña del Mar	Brazil	Colombia	Venezuela	Argentina
2008 †	(Uruguay) Punta del Este	Brazil	Argentina	Venezuela	Uruguay
2009	(Brazil) São José dos Campos	Brazil	Argentina	Venezuela	Uruguay
2010	(Argentina) Mar del Plata	Brazil	Colombia	Uruguay	Argentina
2011	(Brazil) Bento Gonçalves	Brazil	Argentina	Chile	Uruguay
2012	(Brazil) Rio de Janeiro	Brazil	Colombia	Uruguay	Argentina
2013 †	(Brazil) Rio de Janeiro	Brazil	Argentina	Uruguay	Venezuela
2014	Santiago de Chile	Brazil	Argentina	Uruguay	Colombia
2015 ‡	Santa Fe, Argentina	Colombia	Argentina	Venezuela	Uruguay
2016	(Brazil) Rio de Janeiro	Brazil	Argentina	Colombia	Venezuela
2017-1	(Argentina) Villa Carlos Paz	Brazil	Argentina	Colombia	Paraguay
2017-2 †	(Uruguay) Montevideo	Brazil	Argentina	Peru	Paraguay
2018	(Uruguay) Montevideo	Brazil	Argentina	Colombia	Peru
2019-1	(Paraguay) Asunción	Brazil	Argentina	Chile	Peru
2019-2 ‡	(Peru) Lima	Brazil	Colombia	Argentina	Peru
2019-3	(Uruguay) Montevideo	Brazil	Argentina	Colombia	Paraguay
2020	(Uruguay) Montevideo	Brazil	Paraguay	Colombia	Uruguay
2021 †	(Uruguay) Montevideo	Brazil	Colombia	Argentina	Paraguay
2022	(Brazil) Saquarema	Brazil	Colombia	Argentina	Paraguay
2023-1 ‡	(Uruguay) Montevideo	Brazil	Argentina	Paraguay	Colombia
2023-2	(Paraguay) Asunción	Argentina	Brazil	Chile	Paraguay
2024	(Peru) Lima	Argentina	Brazil	Colombia	Uruguay

Notes:

- (†) Rugby World Cup Sevens qualifying tournament.
- (‡) Summer Olympic Games qualifying tournament.

=== Results by team ===
Team	Champions	Runners-up	Third	Fourth
Brazil	21 (list)	2 (2023-2, 2024)		
Argentina	2 (2023-2, 2024)	14 (list)	3 (2019-2, 2021, 2022)	4 (2004, 2007, 2010, 2012)
Colombia	1 (2015)	6 (2007, 2010, 2012, 2019-2, 2021, 2022)	7 (2004, 2016, 2017-1, 2018, 2019-3, 2020, 2024)	3 (2005, 2014, 2023-1)
Venezuela		1 (2004)	5 (2005, 2007, 2008, 2009, 2015)	2 (2013, 2016)
Paraguay		1 (2020)	1 (2023-1)	6 (2017-1, 2017-2, 2019-3, 2021, 2022, 2023-2)
Uruguay			4 (2010, 2012, 2013, 2014)	6 (2008, 2009, 2011, 2015, 2020, 2024)
Chile			3 (2011, 2019-1, 2023-2)	
Peru			1 (2017-2)	3 (2018, 2019-1, 2019-2)

== South American Tournaments ==
=== 2005 Rugby Valentin International Tournament ===
This tournament took place on an unknown date although it appears sensible that it would have been prior to the South American tournament. Little is known apart from the finals

Final

- Brazil A 31-7 Brazil B

Plate

- Argentina A 27-0 Chile

Bronze

- Argentina B 20-0 Uruguay A

Consolation

- Charruas (Brazil) 19-0 Uruguay B

=== 2009 South American Beach Games ===
Venue/Date: 11–13 December 2009, Montevideo, Uruguay

Group Games

- Brazil 5–2 Chile
- Argentina 4–1 Paraguay
- Uruguay 6–0 Venezuela
- Argentina 3–4 Chile
- Brazil 9–0 Venezuela
- Uruguay 6–1 Paraguay
- Brazil 8–0 Paraguay
- Uruguay 2–3 Argentina
- Chile 7–1 Venezuela
- Uruguay 5–4 Chile
- Venezuela 3–6 Paraguay
- Brazil 5–2 Argentina
- Paraguay 3–3 Chile
- Venezuela 1–6 Argentina
- Uruguay 3–2 Brazil

Classification Games

1st v 4th

- Uruguay 3 - 2 Chile

2nd v 3rd

- Brazil 5 - 3 Argentina

3rd place

- Argentina 4 - 2 Chile

1st place

- Brazil 3 - 1 Uruguay

=== 2013 Valentín Martínez ===
Date/Venue: November 9–10, 2013. Montevideo, Uruguay

POOL A

Nation	Won	Drawn	Lost	For	Against
Brazil	3	0	0	114	0
Argentina Rojo	2	0	1	34	43
Uruguay Negro	1	0	2	33	76
Paraguay	0	0	3	14	76

- Brazil 52-0 Uruguay Negro
- Argentina Rojo 17-7 Paraguay
- Brazil 33-0 Paraguay
- Argentina Rojo 17-7 Uruguay Negro
- Uruguay Negro 26-7 Paraguay
- Brazil 29-0 Argentina Rojo

5th/8th Semi Finals

- Paraguay 27-0 Invitacion Circulo de Tennis
- Uruguay Negro 0-29 Chile
- Uruguay 7-17 Argentina

7th Place

- Invitacion Circulo de Tennis 15-12 Peru

5th Place

- Chile 26-12 Paraguay

POOL B

Nation	Won	Drawn	Lost	For	Against
Argentina Azul	3	0	0	87	5
Uruguay Celeste	2	0	1	76	27
Chile	1	0	2	50	57
Invitacion Circulo de Tennis	0	0	3	0	124

- Argentina Azul 41-0 Invitacion Circulo de Tennis
- Uruguay Celeste 33-5 Chile
- Uruguay Celeste 43-0 Invitacion Circulo de Tennis
- Argentina Azul 24-5 Chile
- Chile 40-0 Invitacion Circulo de Tennis
- Argentina Azul 22-0 Uruguay Celeste

Semi Finals

- Brazil 43-0 Uruguay Celeste
- Argentina Azul 36-0 Argentina Rojo

3rd Place

- Uruguay Celeste 14-7 Argentina Rojo

Final

- Brazil 26-17 Argentina Azul

=== 2013 Bolivarian Games ===
Date/Venue: November 17–19, 2013. Chiclayo, Peru

POOL

Nation	Won	Drawn	Lost	For	Against
Venezuela	3	0	0	73	17
Columbia	2	0	1	98	22
Peru	1	0	2	38	61
Ecuador	0	0	3	15	124

Day 1 (17 November)

- Peru 33-10 Ecuador
- Venezuela 17-12 Colombia
- Peru 5-34 Colombia

Day 2 (18 November)

- Peru 0-17 Venezuela
- Colombia 52-0 Ecuador
- Venezuela 39-5 Ecuador

Day 3 (19 November)

3rd Place

- Peru 40-7 Ecuador

Final

- Colombia 12-7 Venezuela

=== 2014 Valentín Martínez ===
Date/Venue: November 8–9, 2014. Montevideo, Uruguay Pool games (where known)

- Brazil 48-0 Peru
- Brazil 46-0 Venezuela
- Venezuela 35-0 Peru
- Paraguay 10-5 Chile
- Argentina 31-5 Paraguay
- Argentina 43-0 Chile
- Colombia 34-14 Uruguay

Semi Finals

- Brazil 45-0 Venezuela
- Argentina 19-0 Colombia

7th Place

- Chile bt Paraguay

5th Place

- Chile 12-10 Uruguay (celeste)

3rd Place

- Venezuela 17-10 Colombia

Final

- Brazil 25-10 Argentina Azul

== Women's Sevens World Series ==
Brazil was previously part of the World Rugby Women's Sevens Series for the 2013–14 and 2015–16 World Rugby Women's Sevens Series.

=== São Paulo ===
Event	Winners	Score	Finalists	Semifinalists
Cup	Australia	24-12	New Zealand	Canada (Third); England
Plate	Spain	5-0	Russia	Japan (Seventh); Netherlands
Bowl	United States	21-0	Brazil	Ireland (Eleventh); Argentina

=== São Paulo ===
Event	Winners	Score	Finalists	Semifinalists
Cup	New Zealand	17–10	Australia	Canada (3rd); France
Plate	England	14–5	United States	Russia (7th); Brazil
Bowl	Fiji	17–12	Spain	China (11th); South Africa

=== São Paulo ===
Event	Winners	Score	Finalists	Semifinalists
Cup	Australia	29–0	Canada	New Zealand (3rd); United States
Plate	France	15–7	Fiji	England (7th); Brazil
Bowl	Russia	38–12	Japan	Spain (11th); Ireland
