= Rugby sevens at the 2022 South American Games – Women's tournament =

2020 Women's South American Games Rugby Sevens Tournament
Tournament details
- Host: Paraguay
- Venue: Estadio Héroes de Curupayty, Asunción
- Date: 7–9 October 2022
- Teams: 9

Final positions
- Champions: Brazil (3rd title)
- Runner-up: Paraguay
- Third place: Colombia
- Fourth place: Argentina

Tournament statistics
- Matches played: 24
- Tries scored: 124 (5.17 per match)

The women's tournament of the rugby sevens at the 2022 South American Games was held from 7 to 9 October 2022 at the Estadio Héroes de Curupayty in Luque, Paraguay, a sub-venue outside Asunción. It was the third edition of the rugby sevens women's tournament at the South American Games since its first appearance in Santiago 2014.

The tournament served as qualifier for the 2023 Pan American Games, with the top two teams (excluding Chile and Brazil) qualifying to the women's rugby sevens tournament.

The two-times defending champions Brazil successfully retained their title by winning the gold medal and thus their third South American Games women's rugby sevens title after beating the hosts Paraguay 17–5 in the final. Colombia beat Argentina with a 14–7 score to win the bronze medal.

Paraguay and Colombia qualified for the 2023 Pan American Games as the Sudamérica Rugby representatives, besides Chile which qualified automatically as hosts and Brazil which had previously qualified via the 2022 Sudamérica Rugby Women's Sevens.

== Schedule ==
The tournament was held over a 3-day period, from 7 to 9 October.

PS	Preliminary stage	CC	Cup & Challenge stage	PM	Placement matches	SF	Semi-finals	B	Bronze medal match	F	Gold medal match

Fri 7		Sat 8		Sun 9			
Morning	Evening	Morning	Evening	Morning		Evening	
PS	PS	CC	CC	PM	SF	B	F
3 M	6 M	3 M	6 M	2 M	2 M	2 M	

== Teams ==
A total of nine ODESUR NOCs entered teams for the women's tournament.

Teams	App	Previous best performance
Argentina	3rd	Silver medal (2014, 2018)
Bolivia	2nd	Seventh place (2018)
Brazil	3rd	Gold medal (2014, 2018)
Chile	2nd	Fifth place (2014)
Colombia	3rd	Fourth place (2014, 2018)
Paraguay	3rd	Bronze medal (2018)
Peru	2nd	Fifth place (2018)
Uruguay	3rd	Bronze medal (2014)
Venezuela	2nd	Seventh place (2014)

=== Rosters ===
Each participating NOC had to enter a roster of 12 players (Technical manual Article 9).

== Venue ==
All matches were played at the Estadio Héroes de Curupayty located within the Parque Olímpico cluster in Luque, Paraguay and owned by the Paraguayan Olympic Committee. The Estadio Héroes de Curupayty, which was remodeled in 2020, has a capacity for 3,000 spectators.

== Results ==
All match times are in PYST (UTC−3).

=== Preliminary stage ===
The preliminary stage consisted of three groups of 3 teams, each group was played under round-robin format with the top two teams progressing to the Cup groups stage and the third placed team of each group advancing to the Challenge group.

==== Group 1 ====
Pos	Team	Pld	W	D	L	PF	PA	PD	Pts	Qualification
1	Brazil	2	2	0	0	71	12	+59	6	Cup groups
2	Uruguay	2	1	0	1	36	33	+3	4	Cup groups
3	Peru	2	0	0	2	0	62	−62	2	Challenge group

Source: ASU2022
Rules for classification: 1) Points; 2) Head-to-head result; 3) Points difference; 4) Tries difference; 5) Points scored; 6) Tries scored; 7) Fewest red cards received; 8) Fewest yellow cards received; 9) Drawing of lots.

7 October 2022
10:06

Brazil	33–12	Uruguay
Try: Anne Crystyan (2) 1' c, 4' c Costa (2) 2' m, 11' c Furtado 10' c Con: Campos 1', 4'; Mariana Nicolau 10', 11'	Report	Try: Verocai (2) 7' m, 8' c Con: Brum 8'

Estadio Héroes de Curupayty, Asunción

7 October 2022
17:58

Brazil	38–0	Peru
Try: Anne Crystyan 3' m Marina Fioravanti (2) 6' c, 10' c Alves 2T; Lopes de Souza 2T; Cardoso 14'; Con: Campos 7', 10', 12'; Mariana Nicolau 2T	Report

Estadio Héroes de Curupayty, Asunción

7 October 2022
20:35

Peru	0–24	Uruguay
	Report	Try: Cruces 1T m Merli 6' m Petrik 9' c Verocai 2T c Con: Brum (2/2) 10', 2T

Estadio Héroes de Curupayty, Asunción

==== Group 2 ====
Pos	Team	Pld	W	D	L	PF	PA	PD	Pts	Qualification
1	Colombia	2	2	0	0	73	7	+66	6	Cup groups
2	Chile	2	1	0	1	38	17	+21	4	Cup groups
3	Venezuela	2	0	0	2	7	94	−87	2	Challenge group

Source: ASU2022
Rules for classification: 1) Points; 2) Head-to-head result; 3) Points difference; 4) Tries difference; 5) Points scored; 6) Tries scored; 7) Fewest red cards received; 8) Fewest yellow cards received; 9) Drawing of lots.

7 October 2022
10:28

Colombia	56–7	Venezuela
Try: Muñoz 2'; Córdoba (2) 3', 6' c Ibarra 5' c Tapias 2T m Soto (4) 2T m, 11 m, 13 m, 14 m Arzuaga 10' m Con: Pacheco 1T; Mejía (2/2) 5', 7'	Report	Try: Camacho 3' c Con: Ramírez (1/1) 3'

Estadio Héroes de Curupayty, Asunción

7 October 2022
17:36

Colombia	17–0	Chile
Try: Ibarra 3' m Alzate 4' m Mejía 6' c Con: Lopera 6'	Report

Estadio Héroes de Curupayty, Asunción

7 October 2022
20:13

Chile	38–0	Venezuela
Try: Rojas (2) 3' c, 13' m Ogalde 4' c Igor (2) 7' c, 8' c Badilla 11' m Con: Castañeda 3', 4', 9'; Badilla 6'	Report

Estadio Héroes de Curupayty, Asunción

==== Group 3 ====
Pos	Team	Pld	W	D	L	PF	PA	PD	Pts	Qualification
1	Argentina	2	2	0	0	65	0	+65	6	Cup groups
2	Paraguay	2	1	0	1	55	15	+40	4	Cup groups
3	Bolivia	2	0	0	2	0	105	−105	2	Challenge group

Source: ASU2022
Rules for classification: 1) Points; 2) Head-to-head result; 3) Points difference; 4) Tries difference; 5) Points scored; 6) Tries scored; 7) Fewest red cards received; 8) Fewest yellow cards received; 9) Drawing of lots.

7 October 2022
10:50

Argentina	50–0	Bolivia
Try: González (2) 1' m, 3' c Medina (2) 5' c, 14' c Del Rosario 1T; A. Moreno 9' c Mattus 11' m F. Moreno 13' c Con: González 4'; Mattus 6', 9'; Medina 13', 14'	Report

Estadio Héroes de Curupayty, Asunción

7 October 2022
18:20

Argentina	15–0	Paraguay
Try: Medina 2' m F. Moreno (2) 6' m, 8' m	Report

Estadio Héroes de Curupayty, Asunción

7 October 2022
20:57

Paraguay	55–0	Bolivia
Try: Viveros 1' c Romero (3) 3' c, 6' c, 9' m González 5' c Cristaldo (2) 8' c, 2T m Gauto 12' m Denis 14' m Con: Viveros 1', 3', 5', 6', 8'	Report

Estadio Héroes de Curupayty, Asunción

=== Cup & Challenge stage ===
The Cup stage consisted of two groups of 3 teams, each group was played under round-robin format with the top two teams progressing to the semi-finals and the third placed team of each group advancing to the fifth place match. The challenge group consisted of three teams and was played under the same format, with the top to teams advancing to the seventh place match and the bottom team ocupping the ninth place in the general ranking.

==== Cup group 1 ====
Pos	Team	Pld	W	D	L	PF	PA	PD	Pts	Qualification
1	Brazil	2	2	0	0	47	0	+47	6	Semi-finals
2	Paraguay	2	1	0	1	19	22	−3	4	Semi-finals
3	Chile	2	0	0	2	0	44	−44	2	Fifth place match

Source: ASU2022
Rules for classification: 1) Points; 2) Head-to-head result; 3) Points difference; 4) Tries difference; 5) Points scored; 6) Tries scored; 7) Fewest red cards received; 8) Fewest yellow cards received; 9) Drawing of lots.

8 October 2022
10:06

Chile	0–19	Paraguay
	Report	Try: Méndez 1' m Alfonso 2' c Romero 6' c Con: Viveros (2/3) 3', 6'

Estadio Héroes de Curupayty, Asunción

8 October 2022
17:56

Brazil	22–0	Paraguay
Try: Costa (2) 1' c, 2' m Silva (2) 7' m, 9' m Con: Campos 1'	Report

Estadio Héroes de Curupayty, Asunción

8 October 2022
20:33

Brazil	25–0	Chile
Try: Silva 1T m Costa 1T m Alves (3) 7' m, 13' m, 14' m	Report

Estadio Héroes de Curupayty, Asunción

==== Cup group 2 ====
Pos	Team	Pld	W	D	L	PF	PA	PD	Pts	Qualification
1	Argentina	2	2	0	0	20	7	+13	6	Semi-finals
2	Colombia	2	1	0	1	26	24	+2	4	Semi-finals
3	Uruguay	2	0	0	2	14	29	−15	2	Fifth place match

Source: ASU2022
Rules for classification: 1) Points; 2) Head-to-head result; 3) Points difference; 4) Tries difference; 5) Points scored; 6) Tries scored; 7) Fewest red cards received; 8) Fewest yellow cards received; 9) Drawing of lots.

8 October 2022
10:28

Argentina	10–0	Uruguay
Try: González 1T m F. Moreno 4' m	Report

Estadio Héroes de Curupayty, Asunción

8 October 2022
18:18

Colombia	19–14	Uruguay
Try: Alzate (2) 6' c, 10' c Mejía 13' m Con: Mejía 7'; Lopera 10'	Report	Try: Petrik 1' c Verocai 3' c Con: Tellechea (2/2) 1', 4'

Estadio Héroes de Curupayty, Asunción

8 October 2022
20:55

Colombia	7–10	Argentina
Try: Alzate 5' c Con: Lopera (1/1) 6'	Report	Try: González 1T m F. Moreno 3' m

Estadio Héroes de Curupayty, Asunción

==== Challenge group ====
Pos	Team	Pld	W	D	L	PF	PA	PD	Pts	Qualification
1	Peru	2	2	0	0	69	17	+52	6	Seventh place match
2	Venezuela	2	1	0	1	39	29	+10	4	Seventh place match
3	Bolivia	2	0	0	2	5	67	−62	2	9th place

Source: ASU2022
Rules for classification: 1) Points; 2) Head-to-head result; 3) Points difference; 4) Tries difference; 5) Points scored; 6) Tries scored; 7) Fewest red cards received; 8) Fewest yellow cards received; 9) Drawing of lots.

8 October 2022
10:50

Venezuela	27–0	Bolivia
Try: Zapata (3) 1' m, 7' m, 9' c Aguilar (2) 1T m, 13' m Con: Pérez 9'	Report

Estadio Héroes de Curupayty, Asunción

8 October 2022
18:40

Peru	40–5	Bolivia
Try: Ruiz (2) 1' c, 14' m Chuquivala 2' c García 8' c Sánchez 10' c Márquez 13' c Con: Chuquivala 1', 2', 8'; Jiménez 10', 13'	Report	Try: Suárez 6' m

Estadio Héroes de Curupayty, Asunción

8 October 2022
21:17

Peru	29–12	Venezuela
Try: García (2) 2' m, 13' c Jiménez 1T m Rios 5' c Correa 7' m Con: García 5'; Chuquivala 13'	Report	Try: Ramírez (2) 4' c, 8' m Con: Camacho 4'

Estadio Héroes de Curupayty, Asunción

=== Final stage ===
The final stage consisted of the seventh place match, the fifth place match, the semi-finals and the bronze and gold medal matches. The semi-finals match-ups were:

- Semifinal 1: Cup group 1 winners v Cup group 2 runners-up
- Semifinal 2: Cup group 2 winners v Cup group 1 runners-up

Winners of semi-finals played the gold medal match, while losers played the bronze medal match.

Semi-finals
9 October
Brazil	28
Colombia	5
9 October
Argentina	14
Paraguay	15

Gold medal match
9 October
Brazil	17
Paraguay	5
Bronze medal match
9 October
Colombia	14
Argentina	7

Seventh place match
9 October
Peru	21
Venezuela	12

Fifth place match
9 October
Chile	15
Uruguay	0

==== Semifinals ====
9 October 2022
9:22

Brazil	28–5	Colombia
Try: Silva 6' c Costa (2) 7' c, 10' c Furtado 12' c Con: Campos (4/4) 6', 8', 11', 12'	Report	Try: Pacheco 6' m

Estadio Héroes de Curupayty, Asunción

9 October 2022
9:44

Argentina	14–15	Paraguay
Try: Brigido 5' c González 14' c Con: González (2/2) 5', 14'	Report	Try: Cristaldo (2) 1T m, 11' m Viveros 13' m

Estadio Héroes de Curupayty, Asunción

==== Seventh place match ====
9 October 2022
10:28

Peru	21–12	Venezuela
Try: Márquez 1' c Rios 3' c Jiménez 6' c Con: Chuquivala (3/3) 1', 4', 6'	Report	Try: Aguilar 8' m Ramírez 10' c Con: Pérez 11'

Estadio Héroes de Curupayty, Asunción

==== Fifth place match ====
9 October 2022
10:06

Chile	15–0	Uruguay
Try: Badilla 3' m Miranda (2) 6' m, 11' m	Report

Estadio Héroes de Curupayty, Asunción

==== Bronze medal match ====
9 October 2022
19:25

Colombia	14–7	Argentina
Try: Soto 8' c Ibarra 12' c Con: Lopera (2/2) 8', 12'	Report	Try: González 5' c Con: González (1/1) 6'

Estadio Héroes de Curupayty, Asunción

==== Gold medal match ====
9 October 2022
20:15

Brazil	17–5	Paraguay
Try: Costa (2) 6' c, 11' m Marina Fioravanti 14' m Con: Campos 6'	Report	Try: Romero 9' m

Estadio Héroes de Curupayty, Asunción

== Final ranking ==
Rank	Team
1st place, gold medalist(s)	Brazil
2nd place, silver medalist(s)	Paraguay
3rd place, bronze medalist(s)	Colombia
4	Argentina
5	Chile
6	Uruguay
7	Peru
8	Venezuela
9	Bolivia

2022 Women's South American Rugby Sevens Champions

Brazil
Third title

Team roster: Mariana Nicolau, Luiza Campos, Eshyllen Eshy, Anne Crystyan, Thalia Costa, Isadora Lopes de Souza, Aline Furtado, Marina Fioravanti, Camilla Carvalho, Andressa Alves, Bianca Silva, Marcelle Souza
Head coach: Will Broderick

== Medalists ==
Gold	Silver	Bronze
Brazil Mariana Nicolau; Luiza Campos; Eshyllen Eshy; Anne Crystyan; Thalia Costa; Isadora Lopes de Souza; Aline Furtado; Marina Fioravanti; Camilla Carvalho; Andressa Alves; Bianca Silva; Marcelle Souza Head coach: Will Broderick	Paraguay Cinthia Cristaldo; Ingrid Alfonso; María Benza; Paula Denis; María Ramos; Lucero Viveros; Chiara Báez; Maira Méndez; María Gauto; Araceli Nicolini; Liz Verónica Romero; Romina González Head coach: Enrique Kneup	Colombia Maribel Mestra; Laura Pacheco; Carmen Ibarra; Daniela Alzate; Laura Álvarez; Valeria Muñoz; María Isabel Arzuaga; Madi Córdoba; Camila Lopera; Laura Mejía; Juliana Soto; Valentina Tapias Head coach: Sebastián Mejía

== Qualified teams for Pan American Games ==
The following four teams from Sudámerica Rugby qualified for the 2023 Pan American Games women's rugby sevens tournament, including Chile which qualified as hosts and Brazil which had previously qualified by winning the 2022 Sudamérica Rugby Women's Sevens in June 2022.

Team	Qualified on	Previous appearances in Pan American Games^{1}
Chile	4 November 2017	0 (debut)
Brazil	11 June 2022	2 (all) (2015, 2019)
Paraguay	9 October 2022	0 (debut)
Colombia	9 October 2022	2 (all) (2015, 2019)

^{1} Bold indicates champions for that year. Italic indicates hosts for that year.
