= 2013 CONSUR Women's Sevens =

- Host nation: Brazil
- Date: 23−24 February

Cup
- Champion: Brazil
- Runner-up: Argentina
- Third: Uruguay

Tournament details
- Matches played: 20

The 2013 CONSUR Women's Sevens is the ninth edition of the CONSUR Women's Sevens and was the last qualifying tournament for the 2013 Rugby World Cup Sevens. The event was held on 23 and 24 February 2013 in Rio de Janeiro and it was for the last remaining World Cup spot. Eight teams competed in the tournament, with Brazil earning their second World Cup appearance.

== Pool Play ==
=== Pool A ===
Teams	Pld	W	D	L	PF	PA	+/−	Pts
Brazil	3	3	0	0	103	12	+91	9
Argentina	3	2	0	1	83	36	+47	7
Chile	3	1	0	2	50	53	–3	5
Peru	3	0	0	3	10	145	–135	3

23 February 2013

Brazil	55−0	Peru

Estádio da Gávea

23 February 2013

Argentina	19−12	Chile

Estádio da Gávea

23 February 2013

Brazil	24−12	Argentina

Estádio da Gávea

23 February 2013

Chile	38−10	Peru

Estádio da Gávea

23 February 2013

Brazil	24−0	Chile

Estádio da Gávea

23 February 2013

Argentina	52−0	Peru

Estádio da Gávea

=== Pool B ===
Teams	Pld	W	D	L	PF	PA	+/−	Pts
Uruguay	3	3	0	0	64	5	+59	9
Venezuela	3	1	1	1	44	29	+15	6
Colombia	3	1	1	1	32	25	+7	6
Paraguay	3	0	0	3	0	81	–81	3

23 February 2013

Colombia	22−0	Paraguay

Estádio da Gávea

23 February 2013

Uruguay	19−5	Venezuela

Estádio da Gávea

23 February 2013

Colombia	10−10	Venezuela

Estádio da Gávea

23 February 2013

Uruguay	30−0	Paraguay

Estádio da Gávea

23 February 2013

Uruguay	15−0	Colombia

Estádio da Gávea

23 February 2013

Venezuela	29−0	Paraguay

Estádio da Gávea

== Playoffs ==
=== Plate ===
Semi-finals
24 February 2013
Chile	31
Paraguay	0
24 February 2013
Peru	0
Colombia	19

Final
24 February 2013
Chile	5
Colombia	19
Seventh Place
24 February 2013
Paraguay	12
Peru	15

=== Cup ===
Semi-finals
24 February 2013
Brazil	34
Venezuela	0
24 February 2013
Argentina	17
Uruguay	7

Final/Qualifier
24 February 2013
Brazil	27
Argentina	14
Third place
24 February 2013
Venezuela	5
Uruguay	17
