= 2019 Sudamérica Rugby Women's Sevens (Asunción) =

- Host nation: Paraguay
- Date: 27–28 April

Cup
- Champion: Brazil
- Runner-up: Argentina
- Third: Chile

Tournament details
- Matches played: 27

The 2019 Sudamérica Rugby Women's Sevens (Asunción) was the 16th edition of the Sudamérica Women's Sevens and was held in Paraguay from 27 to 28 April. The tournament was a warm-up ahead of the 2019 Sudamérica Women's Olympic qualifying tournament in Peru for the Tokyo Olympics. Although the tournament was not a continental championship it still had some prestige. Brazil were crowned champions and Argentina were runners-up.

== Teams ==
- Argentina
- Brazil
- Costa Rica
- Guatemala
- Uruguay
- Chile
- Colombia
- Panama
- Paraguay

== Pool stage ==
Qualified for the gold pool
Qualified for the challenge pool

=== Pool A ===
Team	P	W	D	L	PF	PA	PD	P
Brazil	2	2	0	0	75	5	70	6
Uruguay	2	1	0	1	32	41	-9	3
Costa Rica	2	0	0	2	5	66	-61	0

27 April

Costa Rica	5–27	Uruguay

27 April

Costa Rica	0–39	Brazil

27 April

Brazil	36–5	Uruguay

=== Pool B ===
Team	P	W	D	L	PF	PA	PD	P
Argentina	2	2	0	0	75	0	75	6
Paraguay	2	1	0	1	32	34	-2	3
Venezuela	2	0	0	2	5	78	-73	0

27 April

Paraguay	32–5	Venezuela

27 April

Argentina	46–0	Venezuela

27 April

Argentina	29–0	Paraguay

=== Pool C ===
Team	P	W	D	L	PF	PA	PD	P
Chile	2	2	0	0	49	5	44	6
Peru	2	1	0	1	34	17	17	3
Guatemala	2	0	0	2	7	68	-61	0

27 April

Chile	39–0	Guatemala

27 April

Peru	29–7	Guatemala

27 April

Peru	5–10	Chile

== Finals ==
=== Challenge pool ===
Challenge Champions

Team	P	W	D	L	PF	PA	PD
Paraguay	4	4	0	0	136	15	121
Uruguay	4	3	0	1	78	34	44
Costa Rica	4	1	1	2	44	78	-34
Venezuela	4	1	0	3	42	71	-29
Guatemala	4	0	1	3	27	129	-102

27 April

Paraguay	34–5	Costa Rica

27 April

Uruguay	29–5	Guatemala

28 April

Guatemala	17–17	Costa Rica

28 April

Paraguay	27–5	Venezuela

28 April

Uruguay	22–0	Venezuela

28 April

Paraguay	51–0	Guatemala

28 April

Venezuela	32–5	Guatemala

28 April

Uruguay	22–5	Costa Rica

28 April

Paraguay	24–5	Uruguay

28 April

Venezuela	5–17	Costa Rica

=== Gold pool ===
Qualified for the Gold Final
Qualified for the Bronze Final

Team	P	W	D	L	PF	PA	PD
Brazil	3	3	0	0	77	5	72
Argentina	3	2	0	1	52	27	25
Peru	3	1	1	2	27	44	-17
Chile	3	0	0	3	0	80	-80

27 April

Brazil	15–0	Peru

27 April

Argentina	20–0	Chile

28 April

Brazil	38–0	Chile

28 April

Argentina	27–5	Peru

28 April

Brazil	22–5	Argentina

28 April

Peru	22–0	Chile

==== 3rd Place Playoff ====
28 April

Peru	7–14	Chile

==== Gold Final ====
28 April

Brazil	22–7	Argentina

== Final standings ==
Rank	Team
1st place, gold medalist(s)	Brazil
2nd place, silver medalist(s)	Argentina
3rd place, bronze medalist(s)	Chile
4	Peru
5	Paraguay
6	Uruguay
7	Costa Rica
8	Venezuela
9	Guatemala
