= 2012 CONSUR Women's Sevens =

- Host nation: Brazil
- Date: 10–11 March

Cup
- Champion: Brazil
- Runner-up: Colombia
- Third: Uruguay

Tournament details
- Matches played: 20

The 2012 CONSUR Women's Sevens was the eighth edition of the tournament and was held in Estádio da Gávea, Rio de Janeiro, Brazil from 10 to 11 March. Brazil defeated Colombia 34–5 to win the Championship.

== Teams ==
- Argentina
- Uruguay
- Brazil
- Colombia
- Chile
- Venezuela
- Peru
- Paraguay

== Pool stages ==
=== Pool A ===
Nation	P	W	D	L	PF	PA	PD
Brazil	3	3	0	0	82	5	+77
Uruguay	3	2	0	1	63	12	+51
Venezuela	3	1	0	2	15	47	–32
Peru	3	0	0	3	0	96	–96

March 10

Uruguay	36–0	Peru

March 10

Brazil	25–0	Venezuela

March 10

Uruguay	22–0	Venezuela

March 10

Brazil	45–0	Peru

March 10

Peru	0–15	Venezuela

March 10

Brazil	12–5	Uruguay

=== Pool B ===
Nation	P	W	D	L	PF	PA	PD
Colombia	3	3	0	0	61	24	+37
Argentina	3	2	0	1	92	47	+45
Chile	3	1	0	2	53	61	–8
Paraguay	3	0	0	3	7	81	–74

March 10

Chile	7–20	Colombia

March 10

Argentina	34–7	Paraguay

March 10

Chile	25–0	Paraguay

March 10

Argentina	17–19	Colombia

March 10

Colombia	22–0	Paraguay

March 10

Argentina	41–21	Chile

== Finals ==
=== Cup Final ===
Semi-finals
Brazil	17
Argentina	5
Colombia	10
Uruguay	7

Cup Final
Brazil	34
Colombia	5
3rd Place
Uruguay	12
Argentina	7

=== 5th–8th Place Playoff ===
Semi-finals
Venezuela	20
Paraguay	7
Chile	38
Peru	5

5th-place final
Chile	12
Venezuela	5
7th Place
Paraguay	22
Peru	7

== Final standings ==
Rank	Team
1st place, gold medalist(s)	Brazil
2nd place, silver medalist(s)	Colombia
3rd place, bronze medalist(s)	Uruguay
4	Argentina
5	Chile
6	Venezuela
7	Paraguay
8	Peru
