= 2017 Sudamérica Rugby Women's Sevens =

- Host nation: Argentina
- Date: 18–19 February

Cup
- Champion: Brazil
- Runner-up: Argentina
- Third: Colombia

Tournament details
- Matches played: 24

This edition of the 2017 Sudamérica Rugby Women's Sevens was held in Villa Carlos Paz, Córdoba, Argentina from 18 to 19 February. Despite losing to Brazil in the final, Argentina still got to play at the 2017 USA Women's Sevens in Las Vegas because Brazil was already in the World Rugby Women's Sevens Series. Argentina and Colombia also qualified to compete in the Hong Kong Sevens Qualifier Tournament for the 2017–18 World Rugby Women's Sevens Series. This was Brazil's 13th Sudamérica title.

== Teams ==
- Brazil
- Venezuela
- Paraguay
- Uruguay
- Argentina
- Colombia
- Chile
- Peru

== Pool stage ==
=== Pool A ===
Team	P	W	D	L	PF	PA	PD	P
Brazil	3	3	0	0	128	0	128	9
Paraguay	3	2	0	1	56	50	6	7
Venezuela	3	1	0	2	37	41	-4	5
Uruguay	3	0	0	3	0	130	-130	3

18 February

Paraguay	10–5	Venezuela

18 February

Brazil	52–0	Uruguay

18 February

Venezuela	32–0	Uruguay

18 February

Brazil	45–0	Paraguay

18 February

Paraguay	46–0	Uruguay

18 February

Brazil	31–0	Venezuela

=== Pool B ===
Team	P	W	D	L	PF	PA	PD	P
Argentina	3	3	0	0	77	10	67	9
Colombia	3	2	0	1	71	31	40	7
Chile	3	1	0	2	21	67	-46	5
Peru	3	0	0	3	17	78	-61	3

18 February

Colombia	38–7	Chile

18 February

Argentina	31–10	Peru

18 February

Colombia	33–7	Peru

18 February

Argentina	29–0	Chile

18 February

Chile	14–0	Peru

18 February

Argentina	17–0	Colombia

== Finals ==
=== Cup Quarterfinals ===
Quarter-finals
Paraguay	24
Chile	0
Argentina	24
Uruguay	7
Colombia	10
Venezuela	7
Brazil	53
Peru	0

Semi-finals
Argentina	36
Paraguay	0
Brazil	32
Colombia	0

Cup Final
Brazil	31
Argentina	12
3rd Place
Colombia	5
Paraguay	0

=== 5th–7th Place Playoff ===
Semi-finals
Venezuela	27
Peru	10
Chile	14
Uruguay	0

5th Place Final
Venezuela	24
Chile	0
7th Place
Peru	24
Uruguay	0

== Final standings ==
Rank	Team
1st place, gold medalist(s)	Brazil
2nd place, silver medalist(s)	Argentina
3rd place, bronze medalist(s)	Colombia
4	Paraguay
5	Venezuela
6	Chile
7	Peru
8	Uruguay
