= 2009 Rugby World Cup Sevens qualifying – Women =

The qualification process for the inaugural women's tournament of the 2009 Rugby World Cup Sevens. There are no automatic qualifiers, so all national teams qualified by way of regional tournaments. Unlike the men's tournament, the Arabian Gulf did not prequalify as hosts. The qualification process allocated two slots for Africa, two for North America/West Indies, one for South America, three for Asia, six for Europe and two for Oceania.

== Qualified Teams ==
Africa	North America/ West Indies	South America	Asia	Europe	Oceania
South Africa; Uganda	Canada; United States	Brazil	China; Japan; Thailand	England; France; Italy; Netherlands; Russia; Spain	Australia; New Zealand

== Africa ==
On 20−21 September, seven national teams plus an invitational team met in Kampala for two world cup slots, which has been won by finalists South Africa and Uganda, the former of which winning the tournament.

=== Pool Stage ===
Pool A

Teams	Pld	W	D	L	PF	PA	+/−	Pts
South Africa	3	3	0	0	110	5	+105	9
Kenya	3	2	0	1	42	55	–13	7
Zambia	3	1	0	2	50	51	–1	5
Uganda A	3	0	0	3	0	91	–91	3

Matches

20 September 2008

South Africa	43−0	Uganda A

20 September 2008

Kenya	20−19	Zambia

20 September 2008

South Africa	31−0	Zambia

20 September 2008

Kenya	17−0	Uganda A

20 September 2008

Zambia	31−0	Uganda A

20 September 2008

South Africa	36−5	Kenya

Pool B

Teams	Pld	W	D	L	PF	PA	+/−	Pts
Tunisia	3	3	0	0	110	5	+105	9
Uganda	3	2	0	1	81	12	+69	7
Zimbabwe	3	1	0	2	24	83	–59	5
Botswana	3	0	0	3	0	115	–115	3

Matches

20 September 2008

Uganda	30−0	Zimbabwe

20 September 2008

Tunisia	45−0	Botswana

20 September 2008

Uganda	46−0	Botswana

20 September 2008

Tunisia	53−0	Zimbabwe

20 September 2008

Zimbabwe	24−0	Botswana

20 September 2008

Tunisia	12−5	Uganda

=== Playoffs ===
Plate

Semi-finals
21 September 2008
Zambia	26
Uganda A	10
21 September 2008
Zimbabwe	17
Botswana	0

Final
21 September 2008
Zambia	38
Zimbabwe	0
Third place
21 September 2008
Uganda A	20
Botswana	7

Cup

Semi-finals
21 September 2008
South Africa	26
Kenya	5
21 September 2008
Tunisia	0
Uganda	7

Final
21 September 2008
South Africa	24
Uganda	0
Third place
21 September 2008
Kenya	15
Tunisia	14

== North America/West Indies ==
From 24–26 October, eight women's teams met in Nassau, Bahamas for the NAWIRA Sevens. Champion Canada and runner-up United States ended up qualifying based on the allotted slots.

=== Pool Stage ===
Pool A

Teams	Pld	W	D	L	PF	PA	+/−	Pts
United States	3	3	0	0	142	0	+142	9
Trinidad and Tobago	3	2	0	1	41	52	–11	7
Guyana	3	1	0	2	41	57	–16	5
Bermuda	3	0	0	3	7	122	–115	3

Matches

24 October 2008

United States	45−0	Bermuda

24 October 2008

Guyana	0−5	Trinidad and Tobago

24 October 2008

Guyana	41−7	Bermuda

24 October 2008

United States	52−0	Trinidad and Tobago

24 October 2008

United States	45−0	Guyana

24 October 2008

Trinidad and Tobago	36−0	Bermuda

Pool B

Teams	Pld	W	D	L	PF	PA	+/−	Pts
Canada	3	3	0	0	139	0	+139	9
Jamaica	3	2	0	1	87	29	+58	7
Barbados	3	1	0	2	10	101	–91	5
Cayman Islands	3	0	0	3	5	111	–106	3

Matches

24 October 2008

Jamaica	39−0	Barbados

24 October 2008

Canada	53−0	Cayman Islands

24 October 2008

Jamaica	48−0	Cayman Islands

24 October 2008

Canada	57−0	Barbados

24 October 2008

Canada	29−0	Jamaica

24 October 2008

Barbados	10−5	Cayman Islands

=== Playoffs ===
Plate

Semi-finals
25 October 2018
Cayman Islands	0
Jamaica	34
25 October 2018
Barbados	10
Bermuda	15

Final
25 October 2018
Jamaica	53
Bermuda	0
Seventh Place
25 October 2018
Cayman Islands	10
Barbados	5

Cup

Quarter-finals
25 October 2018
United States	67
Cayman Islands	0
25 October 2018
Guyana	12
Jamaica	0
25 October 2018
Trinidad and Tobago	34
Barbados	0
25 October 2018
Bermuda	0
Canada	34

Semi-finals
25 October 2018
United States	59
Guyana	0
25 October 2018
Trinidad and Tobago	0
Canada	41

Final
25 October 2018
United States	14
Canada	19
Third place
25 October 2018
Guyana	15
Trinidad and Tobago	5

== South America ==
The South American qualifier was held in Punta del Este on 18−19 January, with Brazil claiming the continent's sole women's World Cup spot.

=== Pool Play ===
Pool A

Teams	Pld	W	D	L	PF	PA	+/−	Pts
Brazil	3	3	0	0	119	0	+119	9
Argentina	3	1	1	1	37	24	+13	6
Chile	3	1	1	1	24	43	–19	6
Paraguay	3	0	0	3	0	113	–113	3

Matches

18 January 2008

Brazil	38−0	Chile

18 January 2008

Argentina	32−0	Paraguay

18 January 2008

Brazil	62−0	Paraguay

18 January 2008

Argentina	5−5	Chile

18 January 2008

Paraguay	19−0	Chile

18 January 2008

Brazil	19−0	Argentina

Pool B

Teams	Pld	W	D	L	PF	PA	+/−	Pts
Uruguay	3	3	0	0	51	15	+36	9
Venezuela	3	2	0	3	60	27	+33	7
Colombia	3	1	0	2	42	38	+4	5
Peru	3	0	0	1	5	78	–73	3

Matches

18 January 2008

Uruguay	12−10	Colombia

18 January 2008

Venezuela	34−0	Peru

18 January 2008

Colombia	22−0	Peru

18 January 2008

Uruguay	17−0	Venezuela

18 January 2008

Uruguay	22−5	Peru

18 January 2008

Colombia	10−26	Venezuela

=== Playoffs ===
Plate

Semi-finals
19 January 2008
Chile	19
Peru	0
19 January 2008
Paraguay	0
Colombia	36

Final
19 January 2008
Chile	7
Colombia	17
Seventh Place
19 January 2008
Peru	15
Paraguay	10

Cup

Semi-finals
19 January 2008
Brazil	24
Venezuela	0
19 January 2008
Argentina	10
Uruguay	7

Final
19 January 2008
Brazil	45
Argentina	0
Third place
19 January 2008
Venezuela	17
Uruguay	5

== Asia ==
Nine women's national teams competed alongside the men's teams in Hong Kong on 4−5 October, contesting the three allotted World Cup slots. Finalists Japan and Thailand were joined by third-place China.

=== Pool Stage ===
Legend
Advances to Cup tournament
Advances to Plate tournament
Ninth Place

Pool A

Teams	Pld	W	D	L	PF	PA	+/−	Pts
Kazakhstan	2	2	0	0	30	5	+25	6
Hong Kong	2	1	0	1	17	15	+2	4
Singapore	2	0	0	2	5	32	–27	2

4 October 2008

Kazakhstan	20−0	Singapore

4 October 2008

Hong Kong	12−5	Singapore

4 October 2008

Kazakhstan	10−5	Hong Kong

Pool B

Teams	Pld	W	D	L	PF	PA	+/−	Pts
China	2	2	0	0	92	7	+85	6
(Cooperation Council for the Arab States of the Gulf) Arabian Gulf	2	1	0	1	34	69	–35	4
Sri Lanka	2	0	0	2	17	67	–50	2

4 October 2008

China	40−0	Sri Lanka

4 October 2008

Arabian Gulf (Cooperation Council for the Arab States of the Gulf)	27−17	Sri Lanka

4 October 2008

China	52−7	(Cooperation Council for the Arab States of the Gulf) Arabian Gulf

Pool C

Teams	Pld	W	D	L	PF	PA	+/−	Pts
Thailand	2	2	0	0	36	15	+21	6
Japan	2	1	0	1	37	12	+25	4
Chinese Taipei	2	0	0	2	5	51	–46	2

4 October 2008

Japan	27−0	Chinese Taipei

4 October 2008

Thailand	24−5	Chinese Taipei

4 October 2008

Japan	10−12	Thailand

=== Playoff ===
Plate

Semi-finals
5 October 2008
Hong Kong	31
Chinese Taipei	0
5 October 2008
Singapore	7
(Cooperation Council for the Arab States of the Gulf) Arabian Gulf	17

Final
5 October 2008
Hong Kong	12
(Cooperation Council for the Arab States of the Gulf) Arabian Gulf	0
Seventh Place
5 October 2008
Chinese Taipei	5
Singapore	29

Cup

Semi-finals
5 October 2008
Kazakhstan	0
Japan	5
5 October 2008
China	7
Thailand	14

Final
5 October 2008
Japan	17
Thailand	12
Third Place/Qualifier
5 October 2008
Kazakhstan	5
China	17

== Europe ==
Europe had a sixteen-team tournament in Limoges, France on 14–15 June to determine the six teams eligible for the World Cup. The six top placing teams were England, France, Italy, Netherlands, Russia and Spain.

== Oceania ==
Apia, Samoa played host to the qualifying tournament played concurrently with the men's tournament. The women's tournament started with a five-team round robin before the top four teams advance to the playoff, from which finalists Australia and New Zealand qualified for the World Cup.

First Round

Teams	Pld	W	D	L	PF	PA	+/−	Pts
Australia	4	4	0	0	141	12	+129	12
New Zealand	4	3	0	1	124	25	+99	10
Fiji	4	2	0	2	89	64	+25	8
Samoa	4	1	0	3	60	92	–32	6
Niue	4	0	0	4	0	221	–221	4

Matches

25 July 2008

New Zealand	29−0	Samoa

25 July 2008

Fiji	55−0	Niue

25 July 2008

Australia	21−7	Fiji

25 July 2008

Samoa	48−0	Niue

25 July 2008

New Zealand	59−0	Niue

25 July 2008

Australia	46−0	Samoa

25 July 2008

New Zealand	31−10	Fiji

25 July 2008

Australia	59−0	Niue

25 July 2008

Fiji	17−12	Samoa

25 July 2008

Australia	15−5	New Zealand

Playoff

Semi-finals
26 July 2008
Australia	29
Samoa	0
26 July 2008
New Zealand	35
Fiji	10

Final
26 July 2008
Australia	22
New Zealand	15
Third place
26 July 2008
Samoa	7
Fiji	24
