= 2004 CONSUR Women's Sevens =

- Host nation: Venezuela
- Date: 20−21 April 2004

Cup
- Champion: Brazil
- Runner-up: Venezuela
- Third: Colombia

Tournament details
- Matches played: 20

The 2004 CONSUR Women's Sevens was the first edition of the CONSUR Women's Sevens and was held at Barquisimeto, Venezuela on 20 and 21 April 2004. Brazil won the inaugural tournament after defeating Venezuela in the final.

== Teams ==
Eight teams competed at the tournament.

- Argentina
- Brazil
- Chile
- Colombia
- Paraguay
- Peru
- Uruguay
- Venezuela

== Pool Stages ==
=== Pool A ===
Nation	P	W	D	L	PF	PA	PD	Pts
Brazil	3	3	0	0	130	0	+130	9
Colombia	3	2	0	1	47	47	+0	7
Uruguay	3	1	0	2	25	48	–23	5
Paraguay	3	0	0	3	0	107	–107	3

20 April 2004

Colombia	32–0	Paraguay

20 April 2004

Brazil	33–0	Uruguay

20 April 2004

Colombia	15–5	Uruguay

20 April 2004

Brazil	55–0	Paraguay

20 April 2004

Uruguay	20–0	Paraguay

20 April 2004

Brazil	42–0	Colombia

=== Pool B ===
Nation	P	W	D	L	PF	PA	PD	Pts
Venezuela	3	3	0	0	121	10	+111	9
Argentina	3	2	0	1	95	25	+70	7
Chile	3	1	0	2	10	77	–67	5
Peru	3	0	0	3	12	126	–114	3

20 April 2004

Venezuela	41–0	Chile

20 April 2004

Argentina	56–5	Peru

20 April 2004

Chile	10–7	Peru

20 April 2004

Venezuela	20–10	Argentina

20 April 2004

Argentina	29–0	Chile

20 April 2004

Venezuela	60–0	Peru

== Classification Stages ==
=== Plate Semifinals ===
Semi-finals
Uruguay	24
Peru	0
Chile	10
Paraguay	5

Plate Final
Uruguay	10
Chile	7
7th Place
Paraguay	27
Peru	0

=== Cup Semifinals ===
Semi-finals
Venezuela	22
Colombia	0
Brazil	33
Argentina	0

Cup Final
Brazil	15
Venezuela	12
3rd Place
Colombia	5
Argentina	0
