= 2024 Sudamérica Rugby Women's Sevens =

- Host nation: Peru
- Date: 26–27 October 2024

Cup
- Champion: Argentina
- Runner-up: Brazil
- Third: Colombia

Tournament details
- Matches played: 20

The 2024 Sudamérica Rugby Women's Sevens is the 24th edition of the tournament and is held from 26 to 27 October 2024 at the Villa María del Triunfo Sports Center at Villa María del Triunfo in Lima, Peru.

== Teams ==
Eight teams compete in the tournament.

- Argentina
- Brazil
- Chile
- Colombia
- Paraguay
- Peru
- Uruguay
- Venezuela

== Pool stage ==
=== Pool A ===
Team	W	D	L	PF	PA	PD	Pts
Argentina	3	0	0	126	10	+116	9
Colombia	2	0	1	81	38	+43	7
Paraguay	1	0	2	43	83	–40	5
Venezuela	0	0	3	12	131	–119	3

26 October
08:30

Argentina	57–0	Venezuela

Villa María del Triunfo Sports Center, Lima

26 October
08:52

Paraguay	7–33	Colombia

Villa María del Triunfo Sports Center, Lima

26 October
11:26

Argentina	24–5	Colombia

Villa María del Triunfo Sports Center, Lima

26 October
11:48

Paraguay	31–5	Venezuela

Villa María del Triunfo Sports Center, Lima

26 October
14:22

Argentina	45–5	Paraguay

Villa María del Triunfo Sports Center, Lima

26 October
14:44

Colombia	43–7	Venezuela

Villa María del Triunfo Sports Center, Lima

=== Pool B ===
Team	W	D	L	PF	PA	PD	Pts
Brazil	3	0	0	113	5	+108	9
Uruguay	2	0	1	50	47	+3	7
Chile	1	0	2	29	68	–39	5
Peru	0	0	3	21	93	–72	3

26 October
09:14

Brazil	33–0	Uruguay

Villa María del Triunfo Sports Center, Lima

26 October
09:36

Chile	24–7	Peru

Villa María del Triunfo Sports Center, Lima

26 October
12:10

Brazil	38–0	Peru

Villa María del Triunfo Sports Center, Lima

26 October
12:32

Chile	0–19	Uruguay

Villa María del Triunfo Sports Center, Lima

26 October
15:06

Brazil	42–5	Chile

Villa María del Triunfo Sports Center, Lima

26 October
15:28

Peru	14–31	Uruguay

Villa María del Triunfo Sports Center, Lima

== Knockout stage ==
=== 5th place ===
5th place semifinals
27 October – 09:00
Paraguay	10
Peru	5
27 October – 09:25
Chile	31
Venezuela	0

5th place final
27 October – 13:40
Paraguay	17
Chile	21
7th place final
27 October – 12:50
Peru	24
Venezuela	10

=== Cup ===
Cup semifinals
27 October – 10:40
Argentina	17
Uruguay	10
27 October – 11:05
Brazil	12
Colombia	5

Cup final
27 October – 15:20
Argentina	19
Brazil	10
3rd place final
27 October – 14:30
Uruguay	12
Colombia	17

== Standings ==
Legend
	Core team for 2024–25 SVNS
	Qualified for 2025 Challenger Series

Rank	Team
1st place, gold medalist(s)	Argentina
2nd place, silver medalist(s)	Brazil
3rd place, bronze medalist(s)	Colombia
4	Uruguay
5	Chile
6	Paraguay
7	Peru
8	Venezuela
