= 2014 CONSUR Women's Sevens =

- Hosts: Chile
- Nations: Brazil; Argentina; Uruguay; Colombia; Chile; Paraguay; Venezuela

Final positions
- Champions: Brazil
- Runners-up: Argentina
- Third: Uruguay

The 2014 CONSUR Women's Sevens was the tenth edition of the tournament and was held in Santiago, Chile. The tournament was played as a round-robin with seven teams competing. Brazil were crowned champions after beating Argentina 40–0 in the final. They also qualified for the 2015 Pan American Games.

== Results ==
Rank	Team	P	W	D	L	PF	PA	PD
1st place, gold medalist(s)	Brazil	6	6	0	0	214	5	209
2nd place, silver medalist(s)	Argentina	6	5	0	1	104	65	39
3rd place, bronze medalist(s)	Uruguay	6	4	0	2	74	64	10
4	Colombia	6	2	0	4	50	84	-34
5	Chile	6	2	0	4	47	110	-63
6	Paraguay	6	2	0	4	38	103	-65
7	Venezuela	6	0	0	6	35	131	-96

Argentina	22–0	Paraguay

Chile	5–21	Uruguay

Brazil	44–0	Paraguay

Argentina	21–12	Colombia

Uruguay	15–5	Venezuela

Brazil	48–0	Venezuela

Uruguay	14–7	Colombia

Chile	7–17	Argentina

Brazil	22–0	Colombia

Chile	15–10	Venezuela

Uruguay	17–5	Paraguay

Brazil	34–5	Argentina

Paraguay	7–5	Venezuela

Chile	5–14	Colombia

Brazil	32–0	Uruguay

Argentina	29–5	Venezuela

Chile	15–14	Paraguay

Chile	0–34	Brazil

Paraguay	12–0	Colombia

Argentina	10–7	Uruguay

Colombia	17–10	Venezuela

== Final ==
=== 3rd Place Match ===
Uruguay	5–0	Colombia

=== Final ===
Brazil	40–0	Argentina
