= 2010 CONSUR Women's Sevens =

- Host nation: Argentina
- Date: 5−7 January

Cup
- Champion: Brazil
- Runner-up: Colombia
- Third: Uruguay

Tournament details
- Matches played: 20

The 2010 CONSUR Women's Sevens was the tournaments sixth edition and was held from 5 to 7 January in Mar del Plata, Argentina. Brazil won their sixth consecutive title after successfully defending it against Colombia in the Cup final.

== Teams ==
Eight teams competed at the tournament.

- Argentina
- Brazil
- Chile
- Colombia
- Paraguay
- Peru
- Uruguay
- Venezuela

== Pool Stages ==
=== Pool A ===
| Nation | P | W | D | L | PF | PA | PD | Pts |
|---|---|---|---|---|---|---|---|---|
| Brazil | 3 | 3 | 0 | 0 | 103 | 0 | +103 | 9 |
| Uruguay | 3 | 2 | 0 | 1 | 43 | 33 | +10 | 7 |
| Chile | 3 | 1 | 0 | 2 | 32 | 46 | –14 | 5 |
| Peru | 3 | 0 | 0 | 3 | 0 | 108 | –108 | 3 |

5 January 2010

| Uruguay | 17–5 | Chile |

5 January 2010

| Brazil | 45–0 | Peru |

5 January 2010

| Uruguay | 36–0 | Peru |

5 January 2010

| Brazil | 29–0 | Chile |

6 January 2010

| Chile | 27–0 | Peru |

6 January 2010

| Brazil | 29–0 | Uruguay |

=== Pool B ===
| Nation | P | W | D | L | PF | PA | PD | Pts |
|---|---|---|---|---|---|---|---|---|
| Colombia | 3 | 3 | 0 | 0 | 64 | 12 | +52 | 9 |
| Argentina | 3 | 2 | 0 | 1 | 65 | 21 | +44 | 7 |
| Venezuela | 3 | 1 | 0 | 2 | 24 | 43 | –19 | 5 |
| Paraguay | 3 | 0 | 0 | 3 | 7 | 84 | –77 | 3 |

5 January 2010

| Colombia | 12–5 | Venezuela |

5 January 2010

| Argentina | 34–0 | Paraguay |

5 January 2010

| Venezuela | 19–7 | Paraguay |

5 January 2010

| Colombia | 21–7 | Argentina |

6 January 2010

| Colombia | 31–0 | Paraguay |

6 January 2010

| Argentina | 24–0 | Venezuela |

== Classification Stages ==
Plate Semi-finals

Semi-finals
6 January 2010
Chile | 24
Paraguay | 0
6 January 2010
Venezuela | 36
Peru | 0

Plate Final
7 January 2010
Chile | 10
Venezuela | 5
7th Place
7 January 2010
Paraguay | 15
Peru | 5

Cup Semi-finals

Semi-finals
6 January 2010
Brazil | 22
Argentina | 7
6 January 2010
Colombia | 7
Uruguay | 5

Cup Final
7 January 2010
Brazil | 17
Colombia | 0
3rd Place
7 January 2010
Uruguay | 14
Argentina | 12
