= 2007 CONSUR Women's Sevens =

- Host nation: Chile
- Date: 12–13 January 2007

Cup
- Champion: Brazil
- Runner-up: Colombia
- Third: Venezuela

Tournament details
- Matches played: 20

The 2007 CONSUR Women's Sevens was the third edition of the tournament and took place on 12 and 13 January 2007 in Vina Del Mar, Chile. Brazil successfully defended their title a second time and won their third consecutive tournament.

== Teams ==
Eight teams participated in the competition.

- Argentina
- Brazil
- Chile
- Chile Invitation
- Colombia
- Peru
- Uruguay
- Venezuela

== Pool Stages ==
=== Pool One ===
Nation	P	W	D	L	PF	PA	PD	Pts	
Brazil	3	3	0	0	104	0	+104	9	Qualified for Cup Semi-finals
Venezuela	3	2	0	1	84	10	+74	7	Qualified for Cup Semi-finals
Chile	3	1	0	2	45	46	–1	5	Qualified for Plate Semi-finals
Peru	3	0	0	3	0	177	–177	3	Qualified for Plate Semi-finals

12 January 2007

Brazil	70–0	Peru

12 January 2007

Venezuela	22–0	Chile

12 January 2007

Brazil	24–0	Chile

12 January 2007

Venezuela	62–0	Peru

12 January 2007

Chile	45–0	Peru

12 January 2007

Brazil	10–0	Venezuela

=== Pool Two ===
Nation	P	W	D	L	PF	PA	PD	Pts	
Colombia	3	3	0	0	69	22	+47	9	Qualified for Cup Semi-finals
Argentina	3	2	0	1	68	19	+49	7	Qualified for Cup Semi-finals
Uruguay	3	1	0	2	38	64	–26	5	Qualified for Plate Semi-finals
Chile Invitation	3	0	0	3	10	80	–70	3	Qualified for Plate Semi-finals

12 January 2007

Argentina	32–0	Chile Invitation

12 January 2007

Colombia	33–7	Uruguay

12 January 2007

Argentina	26–7	Uruguay

12 January 2007

Colombia	24–5	Chile Invitation

12 January 2007

Uruguay	24–5	Chile Invitation

12 January 2007

Argentina	10–12	Colombia

== Classification Stages ==
=== Plate Semi-finals ===
Semi-finals
Chile	48
Chile Invitation	0
Uruguay	36
Peru	0

Plate Final
Chile	12
Uruguay	5
7th Place
Peru	10
Chile Invitation	5

=== Cup Semi-finals ===
Semi-finals
Brazil	26
Argentina	0
Colombia	28
Venezuela	17

Cup Final
Brazil	27
Colombia	0
3rd Place
Venezuela	17
Argentina	7
