= 2009 CONSUR Women's Sevens =

- Host nation: Brazil
- Date: 24−25 January

Cup
- Champion: Brazil
- Runner-up: Argentina
- Third: Venezuela

Tournament details
- Matches played: 20

The 2009 CONSUR Women's Sevens was the fifth edition of the tournament and was held on 24 and 25 January in São Paulo, Brazil. Brazil were crowned Champions for the fifth time with their win over Argentina in the final.

== Teams ==
Eight teams competed at the tournament.

- Argentina
- Brazil
- Chile
- Colombia
- Paraguay
- Peru
- Uruguay
- Venezuela

== Pool Stages ==
=== Pool A ===
Nation	P	W	D	L	PF	PA	PD	Pts
Brazil	3	3	0	0	84	0	+84	9
Venezuela	3	1	1	1	60	31	+29	6
Colombia	3	1	1	1	25	34	–9	6
Peru	3	0	0	3	7	108	–101	3

Venezuela	50–0	Peru

Brazil	17–0	Colombia

Brazil	43–0	Peru

Venezuela	10–10	Colombia

Brazil	21–0	Venezuela

Colombia	15–7	Peru

=== Pool B ===
Nation	P	W	D	L	PF	PA	PD	Pts
Argentina	3	2	1	0	102	5	+97	8
Uruguay	3	1	2	0	39	10	+29	7
Chile	3	1	1	1	25	56	–31	6
Paraguay	3	0	0	3	5	100	–95	3

Uruguay	29–0	Paraguay

Argentina	46–0	Chile

Argentina	51–0	Paraguay

Uruguay	5–5	Chile

Uruguay	5–5	Argentina

Chile	20–5	Paraguay

== Classification Stages ==
Plate Semi-finals

Semi-finals
Colombia	33
Paraguay	0
Chile	29
Peru	5

Plate Final
Colombia	32
Chile	0
7th Place
Peru	15
Paraguay	0

Cup Semi-finals

Semi-finals
Brazil	20
Uruguay	5
Argentina	24
Venezuela	7

Cup Final
Brazil	45
Argentina	5
3rd Place
Venezuela	14
Uruguay	7
