= 2008 CONSUR Women's Sevens =

2008 Rugby World Cup Sevens Qualifier
- Host nation: Uruguay
- Date: 18−19 January, 2008

Cup
- Champion: Brazil
- Runner-up: Argentina
- Third: Venezuela

Tournament details
- Matches played: 20

The 2008 CONSUR Women's Sevens was a South American qualifier tournament for the 2009 Rugby World Cup Sevens and was held in Punta del Este on 18 and 19 January. Brazil claimed the region's only Women's World Cup spot after beating Argentina in the Cup final.

== Teams ==
Eight teams competed in the competition.

- Argentina
- Brazil
- Chile
- Colombia
- Paraguay
- Peru
- Uruguay
- Venezuela

== Pool Stage ==
=== Pool A ===
Teams	Pld	W	D	L	PF	PA	+/−	Pts
Brazil	3	3	0	0	119	0	+119	9
Argentina	3	1	1	1	37	24	+13	6
Chile	3	1	1	1	24	43	–19	6
Paraguay	3	0	0	3	0	113	–113	3

18 January 2008

Brazil	38−0	Chile

18 January 2008

Argentina	32−0	Paraguay

18 January 2008

Brazil	62−0	Paraguay

18 January 2008

Argentina	5−5	Chile

18 January 2008

Paraguay	19−0	Chile

18 January 2008

Brazil	19−0	Argentina

=== Pool B ===
Teams	Pld	W	D	L	PF	PA	+/−	Pts
Uruguay	3	3	0	0	51	15	+36	9
Venezuela	3	2	0	3	60	27	+33	7
Colombia	3	1	0	2	42	38	+4	5
Peru	3	0	0	1	5	78	–73	3

18 January 2008

Uruguay	12−10	Colombia

18 January 2008

Venezuela	34−0	Peru

18 January 2008

Colombia	22−0	Peru

18 January 2008

Uruguay	17−0	Venezuela

18 January 2008

Uruguay	22−5	Peru

18 January 2008

Colombia	10−26	Venezuela

== Classification Stage ==
=== Cup ===
Semi-finals
19 January 2008
Brazil	24
Venezuela	0
19 January 2008
Argentina	10
Uruguay	7

Final
19 January 2008
Brazil	45
Argentina	0
Third place
19 January 2008
Venezuela	17
Uruguay	5

=== Plate ===
Semi-finals
19 January 2008
Chile	19
Peru	0
19 January 2008
Paraguay	0
Colombia	36

Final
19 January 2008
Chile	7
Colombia	17
Seventh Place
19 January 2008
Peru	15
Paraguay	10
