= 2005 CONSUR Women's Sevens =

- Host nation: Brazil
- Date: 19−20 November 2005

Cup
- Champion: Brazil
- Runner-up: Argentina
- Third: Venezuela

Tournament details
- Matches played: 20

The 2005 CONSUR Women's Sevens was the tournament's second edition and was held on 19 and 20 November 2005 at São Paulo, Brazil. Brazil beat Argentina in the Cup final to win their second title.

== Teams ==
Eight teams competed in the tournament.

- Argentina
- Brazil
- Chile
- Colombia
- Paraguay
- Peru
- Uruguay
- Venezuela

== Pool Stages ==
=== Pool One ===
| Nation | P | W | D | L | PF | PA | PD | Pts |
|---|---|---|---|---|---|---|---|---|
| Brazil | 3 | 3 | 0 | 0 | 122 | 5 | +117 | 9 |
| Argentina | 3 | 2 | 0 | 1 | 70 | 36 | +34 | 7 |
| Uruguay | 3 | 1 | 0 | 2 | 19 | 56 | –37 | 5 |
| Peru | 3 | 0 | 0 | 3 | 5 | 119 | –114 | 3 |

19 November 2005

| Brazil | 36–5 | Argentina |

19 November 2005

| Uruguay | 19–5 | Peru |

19 November 2005

| Brazil | 34–0 | Uruguay |

19 November 2005

| Argentina | 48–0 | Peru |

19 November 2005

| Brazil | 52–0 | Peru |

19 November 2005

| Argentina | 17–0 | Uruguay |

=== Pool Two ===
| Nation | P | W | D | L | PF | PA | PD | Pts |
|---|---|---|---|---|---|---|---|---|
| Venezuela | 3 | 3 | 0 | 0 | 54 | 7 | +47 | 9 |
| Colombia | 3 | 2 | 0 | 1 | 61 | 15 | +46 | 7 |
| Chile | 3 | 1 | 0 | 2 | 22 | 40 | –18 | 5 |
| Paraguay | 3 | 0 | 0 | 3 | 0 | 75 | –75 | 3 |

19 November 2005

| Venezuela | 10–7 | Colombia |

19 November 2005

| Chile | 17–0 | Paraguay |

19 November 2005

| Venezuela | 15–0 | Chile |

19 November 2005

| Colombia | 29–0 | Paraguay |

19 November 2005

| Chile | 5–25 | Colombia |

19 November 2005

| Venezuela | 29–0 | Paraguay |

== Classification Stages ==
=== Plate Semi Finals ===
Semi-finals
Chile | 36
Peru | 0
Uruguay | 19
Paraguay | 0

Plate Final
Chile | 10
Uruguay | 5
7th Place
Paraguay | 14
Peru | 5

=== Cup Semi Finals ===
Semi-finals
Brazil | 21
Colombia | 0
Argentina | 10
Venezuela | 5

Cup Final
Brazil | 34
Argentina | 0
3rd Place
Venezuela | 19
Colombia | 12
