= 2023 Sudamérica Rugby Women's Sevens =

- Host nation: Paraguay
- Date: 30 September–1 October 2023

Cup
- Champion: Argentina
- Runner-up: Brazil
- Third: Chile

Tournament details
- Matches played: 21

The 2023 Sudamérica Rugby Women's Sevens is the 23rd edition of the tournament and was held from 30 September to 1 October 2023 at the Estadio Héroes de Curupayty at Asunción, Paraguay. Argentina were crowned South American champions for the first time since the inaugural tournament in 2004.

== Teams ==
Seven teams competed in the tournament.

- Argentina
- Brazil
- Chile
- Colombia
- Paraguay
- Peru
- Uruguay

== Tournament ==
=== Standings ===
| Team | P | W | D | L | PF | PA | PD | Pts |
|---|---|---|---|---|---|---|---|---|
| Argentina | 6 | 6 | 0 | 0 | 202 | 19 | +183 | 18 |
| Brazil | 6 | 5 | 0 | 1 | 156 | 20 | +136 | 16 |
| Chile | 6 | 3 | 0 | 3 | 100 | 77 | +23 | 12 |
| Paraguay | 6 | 3 | 0 | 3 | 100 | 82 | +18 | 12 |
| Colombia | 6 | 3 | 0 | 3 | 83 | 98 | –15 | 12 |
| Peru | 6 | 1 | 0 | 5 | 24 | 155 | –131 | 8 |
| Uruguay | 6 | 0 | 0 | 6 | 19 | 197 | –178 | 6 |

=== Matches ===
30 September 2023

| Brazil | 43–7 | Uruguay |

Estadio Héroes de Curupayty

30 September 2023

| Argentina | 38–0 | Colombia |

Estadio Héroes de Curupayty

30 September 2023

| Chile | 19–0 | Peru |

Estadio Héroes de Curupayty

30 September 2023

| Brazil | 31–0 | Colombia |

Estadio Héroes de Curupayty

30 September 2023

| Paraguay | 28–0 | Peru |

Estadio Héroes de Curupayty

30 September 2023

| Chile | 36–0 | Uruguay |

Estadio Héroes de Curupayty

30 September 2023

| Brazil | 24–12 | Paraguay |

Estadio Héroes de Curupayty

30 September 2023

| Argentina | 41–0 | Uruguay |

Estadio Héroes de Curupayty

30 September 2023

| Colombia | 17–12 | Chile |

Estadio Héroes de Curupayty

30 September 2023

| Peru | 14–5 | Uruguay |

Estadio Héroes de Curupayty

30 September 2023

| Argentina | 27–0 | Paraguay |

Estadio Héroes de Curupayty

1 October 2023

| Brazil | 24–5 | Peru |

Estadio Héroes de Curupayty

1 October 2023

| Colombia | 27–0 | Uruguay |

Estadio Héroes de Curupayty

1 October 2023

| Argentina | 26–7 | Chile |

Estadio Héroes de Curupayty

1 October 2023

| Colombia | 29–5 | Peru |

Estadio Héroes de Curupayty

1 October 2023

| Paraguay | 12–14 | Chile |

Estadio Héroes de Curupayty

1 October 2023

| Brazil | 22–12 | Chile |

Estadio Héroes de Curupayty

1 October 2023

| Argentina | 50–0 | Peru |

Estadio Héroes de Curupayty

1 October 2023

| Paraguay | 36–7 | Uruguay |

Estadio Héroes de Curupayty

1 October 2023

| Argentina | 20–12 | Brazil |

Estadio Héroes de Curupayty

1 October 2023

| Paraguay | 12–10 | Colombia |

Estadio Héroes de Curupayty
