= 2016 Sudamérica Rugby Women's Sevens =

- Host nation: Brazil
- Date: 5–6 March

Cup
- Champion: Brazil
- Runner-up: Argentina
- Third: Colombia

Tournament details
- Matches played: 24

The 2016 Sudamérica Rugby Women's Sevens was the 12th edition of the tournament. It was hosted by Brazil as a test event for the Rio 2016 Olympic Games. The tournament was held at the Deodoro Stadium from 5–6 March and consisted of eight teams.

== Teams ==
- Brazil
- Chile
- Colombia
- Uruguay
- Venezuela
- Paraguay
- Argentina
- Peru

== Pool stage ==
=== Pool A ===
Team	P	W	D	L	PF	PA	PD	P
Brazil	3	3	0	0	121	0	121	9
Venezuela	3	2	0	1	50	41	9	6
Uruguay	3	1	0	2	32	76	-44	3
Peru	3	0	0	3	12	98	-86	0

5 March

Brazil	59–0	Peru

5 March

Venezuela	31–12	Uruguay

5 March

Brazil	40–0	Uruguay

5 March

Venezuela	19–7	Peru

5 March

Brazil	22–0	Venezuela

5 March

Uruguay	20–5	Peru

=== Pool B ===
Team	P	W	D	L	PF	PA	PD	P
Argentina	3	3	0	0	92	15	77	9
Colombia	3	2	0	1	69	19	50	6
Paraguay	3	1	0	2	10	69	-59	3
Chile	3	0	0	3	5	73	-68	0

5 March

Colombia	22–0	Chile

5 March

Argentina	32–0	Paraguay

5 March

Colombia	32–0	Paraguay

5 March

Argentina	41–0	Chile

5 March

Colombia	15–19	Argentina

5 March

Paraguay	10–5	Chile

== Finals ==
=== Cup Quarterfinals ===
Quarter-finals
Brazil	41
Chile	0
Colombia	36
Uruguay	5
Venezuela	17
Paraguay	0
Argentina	38
Peru	0

Semi-finals
Brazil	31
Colombia	0
Argentina	22
Venezuela	5

Cup Final
Brazil	27
Argentina	5
3rd Place
Colombia	14
Venezuela	0

=== 5th–7th Place Playoff ===
Semi-finals
Chile	12
Uruguay	7
Paraguay	19
Peru	12

5th-place final
Paraguay	22
Chile	0
7th Place
Peru	15
Uruguay	5

== Final standings ==
Rank	Team
1st place, gold medalist(s)	Brazil
2nd place, silver medalist(s)	Argentina
3rd place, bronze medalist(s)	Colombia
4	Venezuela
5	Paraguay
6	Chile
7	Peru
8	Uruguay
