= 2018 Sudamérica Rugby Women's Sevens =

- Host nation: Uruguay
- Date: 9–10 November

Cup
- Champion: Brazil
- Runner-up: Argentina
- Third: Colombia

Tournament details
- Matches played: 24

The 2018 Sudamérica Rugby Women's Sevens was the tournaments 15th edition and was hosted by Uruguay in Montevideo from 9–10 November. Brazil won their 14th South American title and qualified for a place in the 2018 Canada Women's Sevens. Brazil and Argentina also booked a place in the Women's Sevens Series qualifier that will be held at the 2019 Hong Kong Women's Sevens.

== Teams ==
- Brazil
- Colombia
- Peru
- Costa Rica
- Argentina
- Chile
- Uruguay
- Paraguay

== Pool stage ==
=== Pool A ===
Team	P	W	D	L	PF	PA	PD	P
Brazil	3	3	0	0	125	7	118	9
Colombia	3	2	0	1	56	40	16	6
Peru	3	1	0	2	43	57	-14	3
Costa Rica	3	0	0	3	0	120	-120	0

9 November

Colombia	19–0	Peru

9 November

Brazil	47–0	Costa Rica

9 November

Brazil	38–7	Peru

9 November

Colombia	37–0	Costa Rica

9 November

Peru	36–0	Costa Rica

9 November

Brazil	40–0	Colombia

=== Pool B ===
Team	P	W	D	L	PF	PA	PD	P
Argentina	3	3	0	0	124	17	77	9
Paraguay	3	2	0	1	67	47	20	6
Chile	3	0	1	2	24	74	-50	4
Uruguay	3	0	1	2	19	96	-77	1

9 November

Paraguay	26–7	Uruguay

9 November

Argentina	38–0	Chile

9 November

Argentina	58–0	Uruguay

9 November

Paraguay	24–12	Chile

9 November

Uruguay	12–12	Chile

9 November

Argentina	28–17	Paraguay

== Finals ==
=== Cup Quarterfinals ===
Quarter-finals
Argentina	42
Costa Rica	0
Colombia	36
Chile	0
Brazil	31
Uruguay	0
Peru	15
Paraguay	5

Semi-finals
Argentina	22
Colombia	17
Brazil	31
Peru	5

Cup Final
Brazil	17
Argentina	10
3rd Place
Colombia	12
Peru	5

=== Plate Semifinals ===
Semi-finals
Chile	24
Costa Rica	0
Paraguay	28
Uruguay	0

Plate Final
Chile	22
Paraguay	5
7th Place
Uruguay	31
Costa Rica	0

== Final standings ==
Rank	Team
1st place, gold medalist(s)	Brazil
2nd place, silver medalist(s)	Argentina
3rd place, bronze medalist(s)	Colombia
4	Peru
5	Chile
6	Paraguay
7	Uruguay
8	Costa Rica
