= 2011 CONSUR Women's Sevens =

- Host nation: Brazil
- Date: 5−6 February

Cup
- Champion: Brazil
- Runner-up: Argentina
- Third: Chile

Tournament details
- Matches played: 20

The 2011 CONSUR Women's Sevens was the seventh edition of the competition and took place between 5 and 6 February 2011 in Bento Gonçalves, Rio Grande do Sul, Brazil. Reigning champions and hosts, Brazil, defeated Argentina in the Cup final to retain their title.

== Teams ==
Eight teams competed at the tournament.

- Argentina
- Brazil
- Chile
- Colombia
- Paraguay
- Peru
- Uruguay
- Venezuela

== Pool Stages ==
=== Pool A ===
Nation	P	W	D	L	PF	PA	PD	Pts
Brazil	3	3	0	0	99	7	+92	9
Argentina	3	2	0	1	82	19	+63	7
Venezuela	3	1	0	2	19	110	–91	5
Paraguay	3	0	0	3	0	162	–162	3

5 February 2011

Argentina	43–0	Venezuela

5 February 2011

Brazil	44–0	Paraguay

5 February 2011

Argentina	32–0	Paraguay

5 February 2011

Brazil	36–0	Venezuela

5 February 2011

Brazil	19–7	Argentina

5 February 2011

Paraguay	0–19	Venezuela

=== Pool B ===
Nation	P	W	D	L	PF	PA	PD	Pts
Chile	3	2	1	0	34	15	+19	8
Uruguay	3	2	0	1	55	15	+40	7
Colombia	3	1	1	1	22	35	–13	6
Peru	3	0	0	3	41	72	–31	3

5 February 2011

Uruguay	5–10	Chile

5 February 2011

Colombia	12–5	Peru

5 February 2011

Uruguay	26–0	Peru

5 February 2011

Colombia	5–5	Chile

5 February 2011

Chile	19–5	Peru

5 February 2011

Colombia	5–24	Uruguay

== Classification Stages ==
=== Plate Semi-finals ===
Semi-finals
6 February 2011
Colombia	31
Paraguay	0
6 February 2011
Peru	31
Venezuela	0

Plate Final
6 February 2011
Colombia	15
Peru	0
7th Place
6 February 2011
Venezuela	36
Paraguay	0

=== Cup Semi-finals ===
Semi-finals
6 February 2011
Brazil	5
Uruguay	0
6 February 2011
Argentina	19
Chile	0

Cup Final
6 February 2011
Brazil	32
Argentina	5
3rd Place
6 February 2011
Chile	15
Uruguay	10
