= 2019 Sudamérica Rugby Women's Sevens (Montevideo) =

Sporting event

- Host nation: Uruguay
- Date: 8–9 November

Cup
- Champion: Brazil
- Runner-up: Argentina
- Third: Colombia

Tournament details
- Matches played: 27

The 2019 Sudamérica Rugby Women's Sevens (Montevideo) was the 18th edition of the Sudamérica Women's Sevens and was held in Montevideo, Uruguay from 8–9 November. Brazil defeated Argentina in the final to win their 17th Sudamérica title.

== Teams ==
Nine teams competed in the tournament.

- Argentina
- Brazil
- Costa Rica
- Guatemala
- Uruguay
- Chile
- Colombia
- Peru
- Paraguay

== Pool stage ==
Qualified for the gold pool
Qualified for the challenge pool

=== Pool A ===
Team	P	W	D	L	PF	PA	PD	P
Brazil	2	2	0	0	87	0	87	6
Chile	2	1	0	1	33	40	-7	3
Uruguay	2	0	0	2	0	80	-80	0

8 November

Chile	33–0	Uruguay

8 November

Brazil	47–0	Uruguay

8 November

Brazil	40–0	Chile

=== Pool B ===
Team	P	W	D	L	PF	PA	PD	P
Colombia	2	2	0	0	67	12	55	6
Paraguay	2	1	0	1	48	19	29	3
Guatemala	2	0	0	2	0	84	-84	0

8 November

Paraguay	36–0	Guatemala

8 November

Colombia	48–0	Guatemala

8 November

Colombia	19–12	Paraguay

=== Pool C ===
Team	P	W	D	L	PF	PA	PD	P
Argentina	2	2	0	0	84	5	79	6
Peru	2	1	0	1	34	40	-6	3
Costa Rica	2	0	0	2	5	78	-73	0

8 November

Peru	29–5	Costa Rica

8 November

Argentina	49–0	Costa Rica

8 November

Argentina	35–5	Peru

== Finals ==
=== Challenge pool ===
Challenge Champions

Team	P	W	D	L	PF	PA	PD
Peru	4	4	0	0	90	17	73
Chile	4	3	0	1	104	46	58
Costa Rica	4	2	1	2	44	70	-26
Guatemala	4	1	1	3	48	71	-23
Uruguay	4	0	0	4	29	122	-93

8 November

Chile	54–5	Uruguay

8 November

Costa Rica	0–22	Peru

9 November

Costa Rica	17–7	Uruguay

9 November

Guatemala	0–31	Chile

9 November

Peru	15–5	Guatemala

9 November

Chile	29–7	Costa Rica

9 November

Guatemala	12–20	Costa Rica

9 November

Peru	19–12	Uruguay

9 November

Peru	34–0	Chile

9 November

Uruguay	5–31	Guatemala

=== Gold pool ===
Qualified for the Gold Final
Qualified for the Bronze Final

Team	P	W	D	L	PF	PA	PD
Brazil	3	3	0	0	92	12	80
Argentina	3	2	0	1	45	37	8
Paraguay	3	0	1	2	10	49	-39
Colombia	3	0	1	2	24	72	-48

8 November

Brazil	24–0	Paraguay

8 November

Colombia	12–20	Argentina

9 November

Brazil	21–5	Argentina

9 November

Colombia	5–5	Paraguay

9 November

Brazil	47–7	Colombia

9 November

Argentina	20–5	Paraguay

==== 3rd Place Playoff ====
9 November

Paraguay	12–17	Colombia

==== Gold Final ====
9 November

Brazil	19–10	Argentina

== Final standings ==
Rank	Team
1st place, gold medalist(s)	Brazil
2nd place, silver medalist(s)	Argentina
3rd place, bronze medalist(s)	Colombia
4	Paraguay
5	Peru
6	Chile
7	Costa Rica
8	Guatemala
9	Uruguay
