= 2022 World Rugby Sevens Challenger Series – Women's tour =

2022 Sevens Challenger Series
- Women's tour – Series I
- Hosts: Chile
- Date: 12–14 August 2022
- Nations: 12

Final positions
- Champions: Japan
- Runners-up: Poland
- Third: China

The 2022 World Rugby Sevens Challenger Series – Women's tour was the inaugural season of the second-tier global competition for women's national rugby sevens teams. It was played as a single tournament on 12–14 August 2022 in Santiago, Chile at the Estadio Santa Laura with twelve teams competing. The tournament was the qualifying event for the World Rugby Sevens Series, with the winner gaining promotion as a core team for the 2022–23 season. The tournament was won by Japan 7s, defeating Poland 7s by 17–0 in the final, with China 7s finishing in third place.

== Teams ==
Twelve national women's teams qualified for the Challenger Series tournament in 2022.

Nation	Means of qualification	Date qualified
Chile	Host	13 July 2022
Mexico	2022 RAN Women's Sevens Qualifiers	24 April 2022
Poland Belgium	2021 Rugby Europe Women's Sevens Championship Series	26 June 2021
Japan China Kazakhstan	2021 Asia Rugby Women's Sevens Series	20 November 2021
South Africa Kenya	2019 Africa Women's Sevens	13 October 2019
Papua New Guinea	2019 Oceania Women's Sevens Championship	9 November 2019
Argentina Colombia	2021 Sudamerica Rugby Women's Sevens	12 November 2021
Total		12

== Pool stage ==
All times are CLST, Chile Summer Time: (UTC-3).

Key: Team advanced to the quarterfinals

=== Pool D ===
Team	W	D	L	PF	PA	PD	Pts
Kenya	3	0	0	63	25	+38	9
China	2	0	1	68	24	+44	7
South Africa	1	0	2	34	58	−24	5
Chile	0	0	3	15	73	−58	3

Match 5	12 August 2022	China	15–17	Kenya	Estadio Santa Laura
	14:01

Match 6	12 August 2022	Chile	10–22	South Africa	Estadio Santa Laura
	14:23

Match 11	12 August 2022	Chile	0–36	China	Estadio Santa Laura
	19:10

Match 12	12 August 2022	South Africa	5–31	Kenya	Estadio Santa Laura
	19:37

Match 16	13 August 2022	Chile	5–15	Kenya	Estadio Santa Laura
	00:34

Match 18	13 August 2022	South Africa	7–17	China	Estadio Santa Laura
	03:02

=== Pool E ===
Team	W	D	L	PF	PA	PD	Pts
Poland	3	0	0	143	17	+126	9
Argentina	2	0	1	54	53	+1	7
Belgium	1	0	2	63	51	+12	5
Papua New Guinea	0	0	3	7	146	−139	3

Match 3	12 August 2022	Belgium	41–0	Papua New Guinea	Estadio Santa Laura
	11:29

Match 4	12 August 2022	Poland	36–5	Argentina	Estadio Santa Laura
	11:51

Match 9	12 August 2022	Belgium	10–15	Argentina	Estadio Santa Laura
	16:23

Match 10	12 August 2022	Poland	71–0	Papua New Guinea	Estadio Santa Laura
	16:45

Match 15	13 August 2022	Papua New Guinea	7–34	Argentina	Estadio Santa Laura
	10:12

Match 17	13 August 2022	Poland	36–12	Belgium	Estadio Santa Laura
	12:40

=== Pool F ===
Team	W	D	L	PF	PA	PD	Pts
Japan	3	0	0	91	22	+69	9
Kazakhstan	2	0	1	51	36	+15	7
Colombia	1	0	2	45	50	−5	5
Mexico	0	0	3	17	96	−79	3

Match 1	12 August 2022	Colombia	5–22	Kazakhstan	Estadio Santa Laura
	10:45

Match 2	12 August 2022	Japan	44–5	Mexico	Estadio Santa Laura
	11:07

Match 7	12 August 2022	Kazakhstan	24–5	Mexico	Estadio Santa Laura
	15:39

Match 8	12 August 2022	Japan	21–12	Colombia	Estadio Santa Laura
	16:01

Match 13	13 August 2022	Colombia	28–7	Mexico	Estadio Santa Laura
	09:28

Match 14	13 August 2022	Japan	26–5	Kazakhstan	Estadio Santa Laura
	09:50

=== Ranking of third-placed teams ===
Pos	Team	Pld	W	D	L	PF	PA	PD	Pts	Qualification
1	Belgium	3	1	0	2	63	51	+12	5	Advance to Quarter-finals
2	Colombia	3	1	0	2	45	50	−5	5	Advance to Quarter-finals
3	South Africa	3	1	0	2	34	58	−24	5	

Source: World Rugby

== Knockout stage ==
=== 9th–12th place bracket ===
9th place semifinals
13 August – Estadio Santa Laura
South Africa	29
Papua New Guinea	10
13 August – Estadio Santa Laura
Chile	12
Mexico	5

9th place final
14 August – Estadio Santa Laura
South Africa	29
Chile	10
11th place final
14 August – Estadio Santa Laura
Papua New Guinea	29
Mexico	12

==== 9th–12th place Semi-finals ====
Match 19	13 August	South Africa	29–10	Papua New Guinea	Estadio Santa Laura
	15:24		Report

Match 20	13 August	Chile	12–5	Mexico	Estadio Santa Laura
	15:46		Report

==== 11th place Final ====
Match 29	14 August	Papua New Guinea	29–12	Mexico	Estadio Santa Laura
	14:38		Report

==== 9th place Final ====
Match 30	14 August	South Africa	29–10	Chile	Estadio Santa Laura
	15:03		Report

=== 5th–8th place bracket ===
5th place semifinals
14 August – Estadio Santa Laura
Kazakhstan	12
Colombia	10
14 August – Estadio Santa Laura
Argentina	10
Belgium	12

5th place final
14 August – Estadio Santa Laura
Kazakhstan	17
Belgium	5
7th place final
14 August – Estadio Santa Laura
Colombia	12
Argentina	17

==== 5th–8th place Semi-finals ====
Match 25	14 August	Colombia	10–12	Kazakhstan	Estadio Santa Laura
	10:44		Report

Match 26	14 August	Belgium	12–10	Argentina	Estadio Santa Laura
	11:06		Report

==== 7th place Final ====
Match 31	14 August	Colombia	12–17	Argentina	Estadio Santa Laura
	16:28		Report

==== 5th place Final ====
Match 32	14 August	Kazakhstan	17–5	Belgium	Estadio Santa Laura
	16:53		Report

=== Cup bracket ===
Quarter-finals
13 August – Estadio Santa Laura
Poland	36
Colombia	0
13 August – Estadio Santa Laura
Kazakhstan	7
China	21
13 August – Estadio Santa Laura
Kenya	24
Argentina	7
13 August – Estadio Santa Laura
Belgium	0
Japan	31

Semi-finals
14 August – Estadio Santa Laura
Poland	22
China	15
14 August – Estadio Santa Laura
Kenya	15
Japan	22

Final
14 August – Estadio Santa Laura
Poland	0
Japan	17
Third place
14 August – Estadio Santa Laura
China	31
Kenya	5

==== Cup Quarter-finals ====
Match 21	13 August	China	21–7	Kazakhstan	Estadio Santa Laura
	17:00		Report

Match 22	13 August	Kenya	36–0	Argentina	Estadio Santa Laura
	17:25		Report

Match 23	13 August	Japan	31–0	Belgium	Estadio Santa Laura
	19:06		Report

Match 24	13 August	Poland	36–0	Colombia	Estadio Santa Laura
	19:34		Report

==== Cup Semi-finals ====
Match 27	14 August	Poland	22–15	China	Estadio Santa Laura
	11:33		Report

Match 28	14 August	Japan	22–15	Kenya	Estadio Santa Laura
	00:58		Report

==== Third place play-off ====
Match 33	14 August	China	31–5	Kenya	Estadio Santa Laura
	17:44		Report

==== Cup Final ====
Match 34	14 August	Poland	0–17	Japan	Estadio Santa Laura
	18:47		Report

== Placings ==
The final placings are listed below, the winner being promoted as a core team for the 2022–23 World Rugby Sevens Series:

Pos	Team
1	Japan
2	Poland
3	China
4	Kenya
5	Kazakhstan
6	Belgium
7	Argentina
8	Colombia
9	South Africa
10	Chile
11	Papua New Guinea
12	Mexico

Key: Core team for the World Rugby Sevens Series in 2022–23.

== See also ==
- 2022 World Rugby Sevens Challenger Series – Men's tour
