= 2020 Sudamérica Rugby Women's Sevens =

- Host nation: Uruguay
- Date: 28-29 November

Cup
- Champion: Brazil
- Runner-up: Paraguay
- Third: Colombia

Tournament details
- Matches played: 24

The 2020 Sudamérica Rugby Women's Sevens was the 18th edition of the tournament. It was held in Montevideo, Uruguay from 28 to 29 November. Eight teams competed at the tournament, Brazil won their 17th title and cemented their dominance of South America.

== Teams ==
- Brazil
- Paraguay
- Peru
- Uruguay
- Argentina
- Colombia
- Chile
- Costa Rica

== Pool stage ==
=== Pool A ===
| Team | P | W | D | L | PF | PA | PD |
|---|---|---|---|---|---|---|---|
| Brazil | 3 | 3 | 0 | 0 | 118 | 5 | 113 |
| Paraguay | 3 | 2 | 0 | 1 | 37 | 46 | -9 |
| Uruguay | 3 | 1 | 0 | 2 | 17 | 49 | -32 |
| Peru | 3 | 0 | 0 | 3 | 20 | 92 | -72 |

November 28

| Paraguay | 27–5 | Peru |

November 28

| Brazil | 29–0 | Uruguay |

November 28

| Paraguay | 10–5 | Uruguay |

November 28

| Brazil | 53–5 | Peru |

November 28

| Peru | 10–12 | Uruguay |

November 28

| Brazil | 36–0 | Paraguay |

=== Pool B ===
| Team | P | W | D | L | PF | PA | PD |
|---|---|---|---|---|---|---|---|
| Colombia | 3 | 2 | 1 | 0 | 87 | 29 | 58 |
| Chile | 3 | 2 | 1 | 0 | 75 | 24 | 51 |
| Argentina | 3 | 1 | 0 | 2 | 57 | 34 | 23 |
| Costa Rica | 3 | 0 | 0 | 3 | 0 | 132 | -132 |

November 28

| Colombia | 17–17 | Chile |

November 28

| Argentina | 38–0 | Costa Rica |

November 28

| Colombia | 48–0 | Costa Rica |

November 28

| Argentina | 7–12 | Chile |

November 28

| Chile | 46–0 | Costa Rica |

November 28

| Argentina | 12–22 | Colombia |

== Finals ==
=== Cup Quarterfinals ===
Quarter-finals
Colombia | 34
Peru | 0
Paraguay | 15
Argentina | 10
Brazil | 43
Costa Rica | 0
Uruguay | 15
Chile | 14

Semi-finals
Paraguay | 12
Colombia | 5
Brazil | 51
Uruguay | 0

Cup Final
Brazil | 34
Paraguay | 7
3rd Place
Colombia | 29
Uruguay | 5

=== 5th-place semifinals ===
Semi-finals
Argentina | 36
Peru | 0
Chile | 31
Costa Rica | 0

5th-place final
Argentina | 17
Chile | 7
7th Place
Peru | 31
Costa Rica | 0

== Final standings ==
| Rank | Team |
|---|---|
| 1st place, gold medalist(s) | Brazil |
| 2nd place, silver medalist(s) | Paraguay |
| 3rd place, bronze medalist(s) | Colombia |
| 4 | Uruguay |
| 5 | Argentina |
| 6 | Chile |
| 7 | Peru |
| 8 | Costa Rica |
