= 2017 Sudamérica Women's Rugby World Cup Sevens Qualifier =

2017 Rugby World Cup Sevens Qualifier
- Host nation: Uruguay
- Date: 10−11 November, 2017

Cup
- Champion: Brazil
- Runner-up: Argentina
- Third: Peru

Tournament details
- Matches played: 21

The 2017 Sudamérica Women's World Cup Sevens Qualifier served as the regional qualifier for South America to the 2018 Rugby World Cup Sevens in San Francisco. The event was played as a round-robin tournament and was held at Carrasco Polo Club in Montevideo, Uruguay on November 10 and 11. Brazil won the tournament, thus qualifying for the World Cup Sevens.

== Tournament ==
=== Standings ===
Legend
Qualified to 2018 Rugby World Cup Sevens

Rank	Team	Pld	W	D	L	PF	PA	+/−	Pts
1st place, gold medalist(s)	Brazil	6	6	0	0	240	17	+223	18
2nd place, silver medalist(s)	Argentina	6	5	0	1	197	32	+167	16
3rd place, bronze medalist(s)	Peru	6	4	0	2	75	104	−29	14
4	Paraguay	6	3	0	3	131	89	+42	12
5	Uruguay	6	2	0	4	62	118	−56	10
6	Chile	6	1	0	5	31	200	−169	8
7	Costa Rica	6	0	0	6	10	188	−178	6

=== Matches ===
All matches in Uruguay Standard Time (UTC−03:00).

10 November
9:00

Uruguay	20−7	Chile

10 November
9:22

Paraguay	34−0	Costa Rica

10 November
9:44

Brazil	34−0	Peru

10 November
11:06

Uruguay	15−27	Paraguay

10 November
11:28

Argentina	55−0	Chile

10 November
11:50

Brazil	55−0	Costa Rica

10 November
13:18

Paraguay	14−19	Peru

10 November
13:40

Argentina	41−0	Costa Rica

10 November
14:02

Brazil	55−0	Chile

10 November
15:24

Argentina	36−5	Peru

10 November
15:45

Uruguay	22−0	Costa Rica

11 November
9:00

Chile	5−24	Peru

11 November
9:22

Argentina	19−5	Paraguay

11 November
9:44

Brazil	38−0	Uruguay

11 November
11:06

Peru	17−10	Costa Rica

11 November
11:28

Brazil	36−5	Paraguay

11 November
11:50

Argentina	36−0	Uruguay

11 November
13:18

Chile	19−0	Costa Rica

11 November
14:30

Uruguay	5−10	Peru

11 November
14:52

Chile	0−46	Paraguay

11 November
15:14

Brazil	22−12	Argentina
