= 2015 CONSUR Women's Sevens =

- Hosts: Argentina
- Date: 5–7 June
- Nations: Argentina; Chile; Colombia; Costa Rica; Paraguay; Peru; Uruguay; Venezuela

Final positions
- Champions: Colombia
- Runners-up: Argentina
- Third: Venezuela

The 2015 CONSUR Women's Sevens was an Olympic qualification tournament for the 2016 Summer Olympics which was held in Santa Fe, Argentina from 5-7 June 2015. The tournament was played in a round-robin format, with the top team qualifying directly to the Olympics, and the second and third place teams qualifying for the Final Olympic Qualification Tournament.

Colombia qualified for the Olympics while runners-up, Argentina, and third placed, Venezuela, qualified for the repechage tournament in Ireland.

== Round-Robin ==
Teams	Pld	W	D	L	PF	PA	+/−	Pts
Colombia	7	7	0	0	162	19	+143	21
Argentina	7	5	0	2	193	45	+148	17
Venezuela	7	5	0	2	111	46	+65	17
Uruguay	7	5	0	2	89	61	+28	17
Paraguay	7	3	0	4	115	90	+25	13
Chile	7	2	0	5	111	101	+10	11
Peru	7	1	0	6	22	245	–223	9
Costa Rica	7	0	0	7	17	213	–196	7

5 June 2015
09:30

Peru	0–36	Uruguay

CRAI

5 June 2015
09:52

Costa Rica	0–36	Colombia

CRAI

5 June 2015
10:14

Paraguay	10–0	Chile

CRAI

5 June 2015
10:36

Argentina	24–0	Venezuela

CRAI

5 June 2015
12:04

Venezuela	0–15	Colombia

CRAI

5 June 2015
12:26

Peru	0–42	Chile

CRAI

5 June 2015
12:48

Costa Rica	0–43	Paraguay

CRAI

5 June 2015
13:12

Argentina	10–14	Uruguay

CRAI

5 June 2015
14:40

Costa Rica	0–29	Venezuela

CRAI

5 June 2015
15:02

Paraguay	5–10	Uruguay

CRAI

5 June 2015
15:24

Chile	12–24	Colombia

CRAI

5 June 2015
15:46

Argentina	42–0	Peru

CRAI

6 June 2015
10:36

Paraguay	38–5	Peru

CRAI

6 June 2015
10:58

Chile	0–21	Venezuela

CRAI

6 June 2015
11:20

Colombia	12–0	Uruguay

CRAI

6 June 2015
11:42

Argentina	40–0	Costa Rica

CRAI

6 June 2015
13:12

Chile	36–0	Costa Rica

CRAI

6 June 2015
13:34

Colombia	41–0	Peru

CRAI

6 June 2015
13:56

Uruguay	0–15	Venezuela

CRAI

6 June 2015
14:18

Argentina	41–12	Paraguay

CRAI

7 June 2015
10:42

Colombia	22-0	Paraguay

CRAI

7 June 2015
11:04

Uruguay	12-5	Costa Rica

CRAI

7 June 2015
11:26

Venezuela	34-0	Peru

CRAI

7 June 2015
11:48

Argentina	29-7	Chile

CRAI

7 June 2015
12:54

Uruguay	17-14	Chile

CRAI

7 June 2015
13:16

Venezuela	12-7	Paraguay

CRAI

7 June 2015
13:38

Peru	17-12	Costa Rica

CRAI

7 June 2015
14:20

Argentina	7-12	Colombia

CRAI

== Final standings ==
Legend
Qualified for the 2016 Summer Olympics.
Qualified for the Final Olympic Qualification Tournament.

Rank	Team
1st place, gold medalist(s)	Colombia
2nd place, silver medalist(s)	Argentina
3rd place, bronze medalist(s)	Venezuela
4	Uruguay
5	Paraguay
6	Chile
7	Peru
8	Costa Rica

== See also ==
- 2015 CONSUR Sevens
