= 2022 Sudamérica Rugby Women's Sevens =

- Host nation: Brazil
- Date: 10–11 June

Cup
- Champion: Brazil
- Runner-up: Colombia
- Third: Argentina

The 2022 Sudamérica Rugby Women's Sevens was held in Saquarema, Brazil from June 10-11, 2022. This tournament served as the first qualification event for the 2023 Pan American Games. Brazil won the tournament, with Colombia finishing as runners-up and Argentina securing third place.

== Teams ==
- Argentina
- Brazil
- Guatemala
- Uruguay
- Chile
- Colombia
- Paraguay
- Peru

== Pool stage ==
=== Pool A ===
| Team | P | W | D | L | PF | PA | PD |
|---|---|---|---|---|---|---|---|
| Brazil | 3 | 3 | 0 | 0 | 118 | 5 | 113 |
| Paraguay | 3 | 2 | 0 | 1 | 63 | 42 | 21 |
| Guatemala | 3 | 1 | 0 | 2 | 32 | 100 | –68 |
| Uruguay | 3 | 0 | 0 | 3 | 20 | 86 | –81 |

June 10

| Brazil | 49–5 | Guatemala |

June 10

| Paraguay | 27–5 | Uruguay |

June 10

| Brazil | 37–0 | Uruguay |

June 10

| Guatemala | 5–36 | Paraguay |

June 10

| Brazil | 32–0 | Paraguay |

June 10

| Uruguay | 15–22 | Guatemala |

=== Pool B ===
| Team | P | W | D | L | PF | PA | PD |
|---|---|---|---|---|---|---|---|
| Colombia | 3 | 2 | 1 | 0 | 58 | 24 | 34 |
| Argentina | 3 | 2 | 0 | 1 | 41 | 29 | 12 |
| Peru | 3 | 1 | 0 | 2 | 22 | 62 | –40 |
| Chile | 3 | 0 | 1 | 2 | 43 | 49 | –6 |

June 10

| Colombia | 29–0 | Peru |

June 10

| Argentina | 15–12 | Chile |

June 10

| Colombia | 17–17 | Chile |

June 10

| Argentina | 19–5 | Peru |

June 10

| Argentina | 7–12 | Colombia |

June 10

| Chile | 14–17 | Peru |

== Final & Playoffs ==
=== Semifinals 5th place ===
June 11

| Guatemala | 0–33 | Chile |

June 11

| Peru | 5–0 | Uruguay |

=== Semifinals 1st place ===
June 11

| Brazil | 27–0 | Argentina |

June 11

| Colombia | 7–0 | Paraguay |

=== Playoffs ===
7th Place

June 11

| Guatemala | 17–24 | Uruguay |

5th Place

June 11

| Chile | 12–10 | Peru |

Bronze Final

June 11

| Argentina | 17–0 | Paraguay |

Final

June 11

| Brazil | 27–0 | Colombia |

== Final standings ==
Legend
| | Qualified for the 2023 Pan American Games |

| Rank | Team |
|---|---|
| 1st place, gold medalist(s) | Brazil |
| 2nd place, silver medalist(s) | Colombia |
| 3rd place, bronze medalist(s) | Argentina |
| 4 | Paraguay |
| 5 | Chile |
| 6 | Peru |
| 7 | Uruguay |
| 8 | Guatemala |
