= 2021 Sudamérica Rugby Women's Sevens =

- Host nation: Uruguay
- Date: 11–12 November

Cup
- Champion: Brazil
- Runner-up: Colombia
- Third: Argentina

Tournament details
- Matches played: 27

The 2021 Sudamérica Rugby Women's Sevens was a qualification tournament for the 2022 Rugby World Cup Sevens in South Africa. The tournament was held in Montevideo, Uruguay from 11 to 12 November. Brazil and Colombia both qualified for the World Cup after finishing in first and second place.

== Teams ==
- Argentina
- Brazil
- Costa Rica
- Guatemala
- Uruguay
- Chile
- Colombia
- Panama
- Paraguay
- Peru

== Pool stage ==
=== Pool A ===
Team	P	W	D	L	PF	PA	PD
Brazil	4	4	0	0	171	24	147
Argentina	4	3	0	1	131	50	81
Uruguay	4	2	0	2	100	59	41
Costa Rica	4	1	0	3	26	171	-145
Guatemala	4	0	0	4	29	153	-124

November 11

Uruguay	14–19	Argentina

November 11

Brazil	59–0	Costa Rica

November 11

Brazil	55–0	Guatemala

November 11

Uruguay	38–0	Costa Rica

November 11

Brazil	29–12	Argentina

November 11

Uruguay	36–12	Guatemala

November 11

Argentina	57–7	Costa Rica

November 12

Argentina	43–0	Guatemala

November 12

Brazil	28–12	Uruguay

November 12

Costa Rica	19–17	Guatemala

=== Pool B ===
Team	P	W	D	L	PF	PA	PD
Colombia	4	4	0	0	105	15	90
Paraguay	4	3	0	1	101	17	84
Chile	4	2	0	2	89	44	45
Peru	4	1	0	3	44	48	-4
Panama	4	0	0	4	0	215	-215

November 11

Colombia	15–10	Chile

November 11

Paraguay	19–0	Peru

November 11

Paraguay	48–0	Panama

November 11

Colombia	17–0	Peru

November 11

Paraguay	29–7	Chile

November 11

Colombia	63–0	Panama

November 11

Chile	12–0	Peru

November 12

Chile	60–0	Panama

November 12

Paraguay	5–10	Colombia

November 12

Peru	44–0	Panama

== Final & Playoffs ==
=== Semifinals ===
November 12

Brazil	57–0	Paraguay

November 12

Colombia	15–14	Argentina

=== Playoffs ===
9th Place

November 12

Guatemala	37–0	Panama

7th Place

November 12

Peru	38–5	Costa Rica

5th Place

November 12

Uruguay	17–12	Chile

Bronze Final

November 12

Argentina	24–5	Paraguay

Final

November 12

Brazil	36–5	Colombia

== Final standings ==
Legend
	Qualified for the 2022 Rugby World Cup Sevens

Rank	Team
1st place, gold medalist(s)	Brazil
2nd place, silver medalist(s)	Colombia
3rd place, bronze medalist(s)	Argentina
4	Paraguay
5	Uruguay
6	Chile
7	Peru
8	Costa Rica
9	Guatemala
10	Panama
