= 2019 Sudamérica Rugby Women's Sevens Olympic Qualifying Tournament =

- Host nation: Peru
- Date: 1–2 June 2019

Cup
- Champion: Brazil
- Runner-up: Colombia
- Third: Argentina

Tournament details
- Matches played: 27

The 2019 Sudamérica Rugby Women's Sevens Olympic Qualifying Tournament for the 2020 Summer Olympics held on 1–2 June 2019. The winner of the tournament represents Sudamérica Rugby, with the runner-up and third place participant qualified for a 2020 repechage tournament.

== Teams ==
- Argentina
- Brazil
- Chile
- Colombia
- Costa Rica
- Guatemala
- Paraguay
- Peru
- Uruguay
- Venezuela

== Pool stage ==
All times in Peru Time (UTC−05:00)

Legend
Advance to qualifier semifinals
Advance to fifth place match
Advance to seventh place match
Advance to ninth place match

=== Pool A ===
Team	Pld	W	D	L	PF	PA	PD	Pts
Brazil	4	4	0	0	200	17	+183	12
Peru	4	3	0	1	80	50	+30	10
Paraguay	4	2	0	2	65	79	–14	8
Venezuela	4	1	0	3	36	123	–87	6
Guatemala	4	0	0	4	15	127	–112	4

1 June 2019
10:00

Peru	19–5	Paraguay

Andrés Avelino Cáceres Complex, Lima

1 June 2019
10:22

Brazil	55–0	Venezuela

Andrés Avelino Cáceres Complex, Lima

1 June 2019
11:46

Brazil	55–0	Guatemala

Andrés Avelino Cáceres Complex, Lima

1 June 2019
12:08

Peru	27–5	Venezuela

Andrés Avelino Cáceres Complex, Lima

1 June 2019
13:34

Brazil	50–5	Paraguay

Andrés Avelino Cáceres Complex, Lima

1 June 2019
13:56

Peru	22–0	Guatemala

Andrés Avelino Cáceres Complex, Lima

1 June 2019
15:02

Paraguay	36–0	Venezuela

Andrés Avelino Cáceres Complex, Lima

2 June 2019
10:00

Brazil	40–12	Peru

Andrés Avelino Cáceres Complex, Lima

2 June 2019
10:22

Paraguay	19–10	Guatemala

Andrés Avelino Cáceres Complex, Lima

2 June 2019
11:28

Venezuela	31–5	Guatemala

Andrés Avelino Cáceres Complex, Lima

=== Pool B ===
Team	Pld	W	D	L	PF	PA	PD	Pts
Colombia	4	3	1	0	164	31	+133	11
Argentina	4	3	1	0	154	24	+130	11
Chile	4	2	0	2	45	64	-19	8
Uruguay	4	1	0	3	25	112	–87	6
Costa Rica	4	0	0	4	0	157	–157	4

1 June 2019
10:44

Chile	12–5	Uruguay

Andrés Avelino Cáceres Complex, Lima

1 June 2019
11:06

Argentina	40–0	Costa Rica

Andrés Avelino Cáceres Complex, Lima

1 June 2019
12:30

Argentina	24–24	Colombia

Andrés Avelino Cáceres Complex, Lima

1 June 2019
12:52

Chile	26–0	Costa Rica

Andrés Avelino Cáceres Complex, Lima

1 June 2019
14:18

Argentina	50–0	Uruguay

Andrés Avelino Cáceres Complex, Lima

1 June 2019
14:40

Chile	7–19	Colombia

Andrés Avelino Cáceres Complex, Lima

1 June 2019
15:22

Uruguay	20–0	Costa Rica

Andrés Avelino Cáceres Complex, Lima

2 June 2019
10:44

Argentina	40–0	Chile

Andrés Avelino Cáceres Complex, Lima

2 June 2019
11:06

Uruguay	0–50	Colombia

Andrés Avelino Cáceres Complex, Lima

2 June 2019
11:50

Costa Rica	0–71	Colombia

Andrés Avelino Cáceres Complex, Lima

== Placement rounds ==
Ninth place

2 June 2019
13:16

Guatemala	19–17	Costa Rica

Andrés Avelino Cáceres Complex, Lima

Seventh place

2 June 2019
13:38

Venezuela	0–24	Uruguay

Andrés Avelino Cáceres Complex, Lima

Fifth place

2 June 2019
14:00

Paraguay	27–7	Chile

Andrés Avelino Cáceres Complex, Lima

== Olympic Qualification ==
Semi-finals
2 June 2019 – 12:32 – Andrés Avelino Cáceres Complex
Brazil	36
Argentina	14
2 June 2019 – 12:54 – Andrés Avelino Cáceres Complex
Colombia	19
Peru	5

Final
2 June 2019 – 15:12 – Andrés Avelino Cáceres Complex
Brazil	28
Colombia	15
Third place
2 June 2019 – 14:50 – Andrés Avelino Cáceres Complex
Argentina	22
Peru	12

== Standings ==
Legend
Green fill	Qualified for the 2020 Olympics
Blue fill	Qualified for the 2020 Repechage
Blue bar	Qualified for the 2019 Pan American Games

Rank	Team
1st place, gold medalist(s)	Brazil
2nd place, silver medalist(s)	Colombia
3rd place, bronze medalist(s)	Argentina
4	Peru
5	Paraguay
6	Chile
7	Uruguay
8	Venezuela
9	Guatemala
10	Costa Rica

== See also ==
- Rugby sevens at the 2019 Pan American Games
