= Andressa Alves (rugby union) =

Brazilian rugby sevens player (born 2000)

- Born: 9 December 2000 (age 25)
- Height: 1.67 m (5 ft 6 in)
- Weight: 61 kg (134 lb)

Rugby union career
National sevens team
Years	Team	Comps
	Brazil	23 (15 pts)

Andressa Alves (born 9 December 2000) is a Brazilian rugby sevens player.

Alves represented Brazil at the 2022 Rugby World Cup Sevens in Cape Town. They defeated Spain 19–17 in the 11th-place final to finish eleventh overall.
