= Estefanía Ramírez (rugby union) =

Colombian rugby union player (born 1991)

- Born: October 10, 1991 (age 35)
- Height: 1.58 m (5 ft 2 in)
- Weight: 56 kg (123 lb; 8 st 11 lb)

Rugby union career
National sevens team
Years	Team	Comps
- Colombia

Estefanía Ramírez Castillo (born 10 October 1991) is a Colombian rugby union player. She represented Colombia at the 2015 Pan American Games in Toronto, Ontario, Canada. She was part of the Colombian team that featured at the 2016 USA Women's Sevens in Atlanta.

Ramirez was selected for Colombia's women's sevens team for the 2016 Summer Olympics.
