= 2022 Rugby World Cup Sevens – Women's tournament =

Rugby World Cup

Tournament details
- Venue: Cape Town Stadium
- Dates: 9 – 11 September 2022
- No. of nations: 16

Final positions
- Champions: Australia
- Runner-up: New Zealand
- Third place: France

Tournament statistics
- Matches played: 32
- Top scorer(s): Faith Nathan (45)
- Most tries: Faith Nathan (9)

The women's tournament for the 2022 Rugby World Cup Sevens was held in Cape Town, South Africa from 9 to 11 September at the Cape Town Stadium.

== Teams ==
The four semi-finalists from the 2018 Rugby World Cup Sevens were automatic qualifiers, with South Africa also qualifying as host. The remaining eleven places were decided in the six continental regions.

Region	Automatic qualifiers	Continental qualifiers	Total teams
Africa (Note: Africa: The runner-up of the 2022 Africa Women's Sevens joined automatic qualifier South Africa (who won the tournament) at the 2022 Rugby World Cup Sevens.)	South Africa (hosts)	Madagascar	2
North America (Note: North America: The winner of the 2022 RAN Women's Sevens Qualifiers joined automatic qualifier United States at the 2022 Rugby World Cup Sevens.)	United States	Canada	2
South America (Note: South America did not have an automatic qualifier but the top two teams from the 2021 Sudamérica Rugby Women's Sevens won qualifier berths.)	—	Brazil; Colombia	2
Asia (Note: Asia did not have an automatic qualifier but the top two teams from the 2021 Asia Rugby Women's Sevens Series won qualifier berths.)	—	China; Japan	2
Europe (Note: Europe: The top four teams from the 2022 European Qualifier event joined automatic qualifier France at the 2022 Rugby World Cup Sevens.)	France	England; Ireland; Poland; Spain	5
Oceania (Note: Oceania was not able to hold a qualifying tournament due to ongoing impacts of COVID-19 in 2021 and 2022. While New Zealand and Australia qualified automatically, the third qualifier berth at the 2022 Rugby World Cup Sevens was determined by the most recent placings in the World Rugby Series, awarded to Fiji who finished seventh in the 2020 World Series.)	Australia; New Zealand (holders)	Fiji	3
Totals	5	11	16

== Draw ==
The ten core teams from the World Rugby Sevens Series were seeded according to their points accumulated across the 2019–20 and 2021–22 seasons.

Seed	Season Team	2019–20	2021–22	Total Points
1	Australia	80	80	160
2	New Zealand	96	57	153
3	France	70	60	130
4	United States	66	56	122
5	Canada	80	40	100
6	Fiji	38	60	98
7	Ireland	15	60	75
8	England	36	33	69
9	Spain	28	26	54
10	Brazil	10	24	30

The remaining six teams were seeded based on regional ranking positions in July 2022.

Seed	Team
11	Japan
12	China
13	Poland
14	South Africa
15	Colombia
16	Madagascar

== Format ==
Like the previous edition, the tournament was played using a knock-out format.

- Teams in the Championship Cup competed for the Rugby Sevens World Cup trophy and gold, silver and bronze medals.
- Losing teams in the Championship Cup quarterfinals played off for 5th to 8th place.
- Losing teams in the Championship Cup Round of 16 (first round) competed for the Challenge Trophy and lower places.
- All teams played four matches.

== Tournament ==
Match results as per the official website:

All times are local (UTC+2).

=== 13th place ===
13th–16th semifinals
10 September – Cape Town Stadium
Madagascar	5
China	36
10 September – Cape Town Stadium
South Africa	27
Colombia	0

13th-place final
11 September – Cape Town Stadium
China	21
South Africa	19
15th-place final
11 September – Cape Town Stadium
Madagascar	19
Colombia	12

Matches

13th–16th semi-finals

Match 17	10 September	Madagascar	5–36	China	Cape Town Stadium
	15:05

Match 18	10 September	South Africa	27–0	Colombia	Cape Town Stadium
	15:27

15th-place final

Match 25	11 September	Madagascar	19-12	Colombia	Cape Town Stadium
	14:15

13th-place final

Match 26	11 September	China	21-19	South Africa	Cape Town Stadium
	14:37

=== Challenge Trophy ===
Challenge quarter-finals
10 September – Cape Town Stadium
Spain	12
Madagascar	0
10 September – Cape Town Stadium
Poland	20
China	14
10 September – Cape Town Stadium
Japan	14
South Africa	12
10 September – Cape Town Stadium
Colombia	0
Brazil	33

Challenge semi-finals
10 September – Cape Town Stadium
Spain	10
Poland	19
10 September – Cape Town Stadium
Japan	19
Brazil	10

Challenge final
11 September – Cape Town Stadium
Poland	12
Japan	17
11th-place final
11 September – Cape Town Stadium
Spain	17
Brazil	19

Matches

Challenge quarter-finals

Match 9	10 September	Madagascar	0–12	Spain	Cape Town Stadium
	09:53

Match 10	10 September	Colombia	0–33	Brazil	Cape Town Stadium
	10:15

Match 11	10 September	South Africa	12–14	Japan	Cape Town Stadium
	10:37

Match 12	10 September	Poland	20–14	China	Cape Town Stadium
	10:59

Challenge semi-finals

Match 19	10 September	Spain	10–19	Poland	Cape Town Stadium
	15:49

Match 20	10 September	Brazil	10–19	Japan	Cape Town Stadium
	16:11

11th-place final

Match 27	11 September	Spain	17–19	Brazil	Cape Town Stadium
	14:59

Challenge final

Match 28	11 September	Poland	12–17	Japan	Cape Town Stadium
	15:21

=== 5th place ===
5th–8th semi-finals
11 September – Cape Town Stadium
England	7
Canada	22
11 September – Cape Town Stadium
Fiji	24
Ireland	0

5th-place final
11 September – Cape Town Stadium
Canada	0
Fiji	53
7th-place final
11 September – Cape Town Stadium
England	10
Ireland	26

Matches

5th–8th semi-finals

Match 21	11 September	England	7–22	Canada	Cape Town Stadium
	10:18

Match 22	11 September	Fiji	24–0	Ireland	Cape Town Stadium
	10:40

7th-place final

Match 29	11 September	England	10–26	Ireland	Cape Town Stadium
	17:31

5th-place final

Match 30	11 September	Canada	0–53	Fiji	Cape Town Stadium
	17:53

=== Championship Cup ===
Round of 16
9 September – Cape Town Stadium
Australia (1)	48
Madagascar (16)	0
9 September – Cape Town Stadium
Spain (9)	5
England (8)	29
9 September – Cape Town Stadium
Canada (5)	24
China (12)	5
9 September – Cape Town Stadium
Poland (13)	7
United States (4)	39
9 September – Cape Town Stadium
France (3)	29
South Africa (14)	0
9 September – Cape Town Stadium
Japan (11)	7
Fiji (6)	36
9 September – Cape Town Stadium
Ireland (7)	24
Brazil (10)	12
9 September – Cape Town Stadium
Colombia (15)	5
New Zealand (2)	47

Quarter-finals
10 September – Cape Town Stadium
Australia	35
England	5
10 September – Cape Town Stadium
Canada	7
United States	10
10 September – Cape Town Stadium
France	19
Fiji	14
10 September – Cape Town Stadium
Ireland	0
New Zealand	28

Semi-finals
11 September – Cape Town Stadium
Australia	17
United States	7
11 September – Cape Town Stadium
France	7
New Zealand	38

Cup final
11 September – Cape Town Stadium
Australia	24
New Zealand	22
Bronze final
11 September – Cape Town Stadium
United States	7
France	29

Matches

Round of 16

Match 1	9 September	Australia	48–0	Madagascar	Cape Town Stadium
	12:11

Match 4	9 September	United States	39–7	Poland	Cape Town Stadium
	12:33

Match 5	9 September	Canada	24–5	China	Cape Town Stadium
	12:55

Match 6	9 September	Fiji	36–7	Japan	Cape Town Stadium
	13:17

Match 7	9 September	Ireland	24–12	Brazil	Cape Town Stadium
	13:54

Match 8	9 September	England	29–5	Spain	Cape Town Stadium
	14:16

Match 2	9 September	New Zealand	47–5	Colombia	Cape Town Stadium
	17:37

Match 3	9 September	France	29–0	South Africa	Cape Town Stadium
	18:35

Quarter-finals

Match 13	10 September	Australia	35–5	England	Cape Town Stadium
	19:07

Match 14	10 September	New Zealand	28–0	Ireland	Cape Town Stadium
	20:05

Match 15	10 September	France	19–14	Fiji	Cape Town Stadium
	21:05

Match 16	10 September	United States	10–7	Canada	Cape Town Stadium
	22:05

Semi-finals

Match 23	11 September	New Zealand	38–7	France	Cape Town Stadium
	12:07

Match 24	11 September	Australia	17–7	United States	Cape Town Stadium
	13:05

Bronze final

Match 31	11 September	United States	7–29	France	Cape Town Stadium
	19:01

Cup final

Match 32	11 September	Australia	24–22	New Zealand	Cape Town Stadium
	20:17

== Final placings ==
Place	Team
1st place, gold medalist(s)	Australia
2nd place, silver medalist(s)	New Zealand
3rd place, bronze medalist(s)	France
4	United States
5	Fiji
6	Canada
7	Ireland
8	England

Place	Team
9	Japan
10	Poland
11	Brazil
12	Spain
13	China
14	South Africa
15	Madagascar
16	Colombia

== Player scoring ==
Tries scored
Rank	Player	Tries
1	Faith Nathan	9
2	Ana Maria Naimasi	6
3	Nadine Roos	5
3	Reapi Ulunisau	5
3	Wakaba Hara	5

Points scored
Rank	Player	Points
1	Faith Nathan	45
2	Ana Maria Naimasi	34
3	Reapi Ulunisau	33
4	Risi Pouri-Lane	32
5	Nadine Roos	31

== See also ==
- 2022 Rugby World Cup Sevens – Men's tournament
