= Chile women's national rugby union team =

Chile
- Nickname: Manque (Condor in Mapudungun)
- Union: Chilean Rugby Federation
- Head coach: Eduardo Acosta
First colours	Second colours

World Rugby ranking
- Current: 32 (as of 26 October 2026)
- Highest: 28 (2026)
- Lowest: 34 (2026)

First international
- Peru 0–54 Chile (Lima, Perú; 26 October 2025)

Biggest win
- Peru 0–54 Chile (Lima, Perú; 26 October 2025)

Biggest defeat
- Chile 19–28 Colombia (La Reina, Chile; 24 October 2026)

The Chile women's national rugby union team is a Rugby union national women's side that represents Chile.

== History ==
In the 2025 season, a women’s rugby union (rugby XV) championship was held in Chile for the first time; organized by the Santiago Rugby Association, it was known as the ARUSA Women’s Rugby Championship.

The national team's first-ever international match took place on October 26, 2025, against the Peruvian national team in Lima, Perú, resulting in a 54–0 victory.

For October 2026, Manque has scheduled two home matches against the national teams of Mexico and Colombia.

== Records ==
(Full internationals only, updated to 24 October 2026)

Chile Internationals From 2025
Opponent	First Match	Played	Won	Drawn	Lost	For	Against	Win %
Colombia	2026	1	0	0	1	19	28	0.00%
Mexico	2026	1	1	0	0	39	10	100.00%
Peru	2025	1	1	0	0	54	0	100.00%
Summary	2025	3	2	0	1	112	30	66.67%

== See also ==
- Chile women's national rugby sevens team
- Chile national rugby union team
