= Estadio Héroes de Curupayty =

Paraguayan rugby union stadium

- Interactive map of Estadio Héroes de Curupayty
- Address: Luque; Paraguay
- Coordinates: 25.2567°S 57.5307°W
- Owner: Government of Paraguay
- Capacity: 3,000 (before its redevelopment in 2020)
- Surface: Synthetic turf

Construction
- Renovated: 2020

Tenants
- Paraguay national rugby union team; Yakare XV

The Estadio Héroes de Curupayty is a rugby union stadium in Luque, Paraguay. It is owned by the National Government of Paraguay and administered by Secretaria Nacional de Deportes through the Paraguayan Rugby Union. The stadium is located within the Parque Olímpico, property of the Paraguayan Olympic Committee, and it is the home ground of the Paraguay national rugby union team.

In early 2020, the stadium underwent renovation works for a total amount of ₲ 2,998,882.813 and was reopened on 25 November 2020. The works included the implementation of synthetic turf which complies with Regulation 22 of World Rugby that specifies the requirements for artificial turf for use in the sport of rugby. Before its redevelopment the stadium had a capacity for 3,000 seated people.

In October 2021 it hosted the rugby sevens competitions at the 2022 South American Games.
