= Estádio da Gávea =

Football stadium in Lagoa, Rio de Janeiro, Brazil

Coordinates: 22°58′41.59″S 43°13′15.72″W

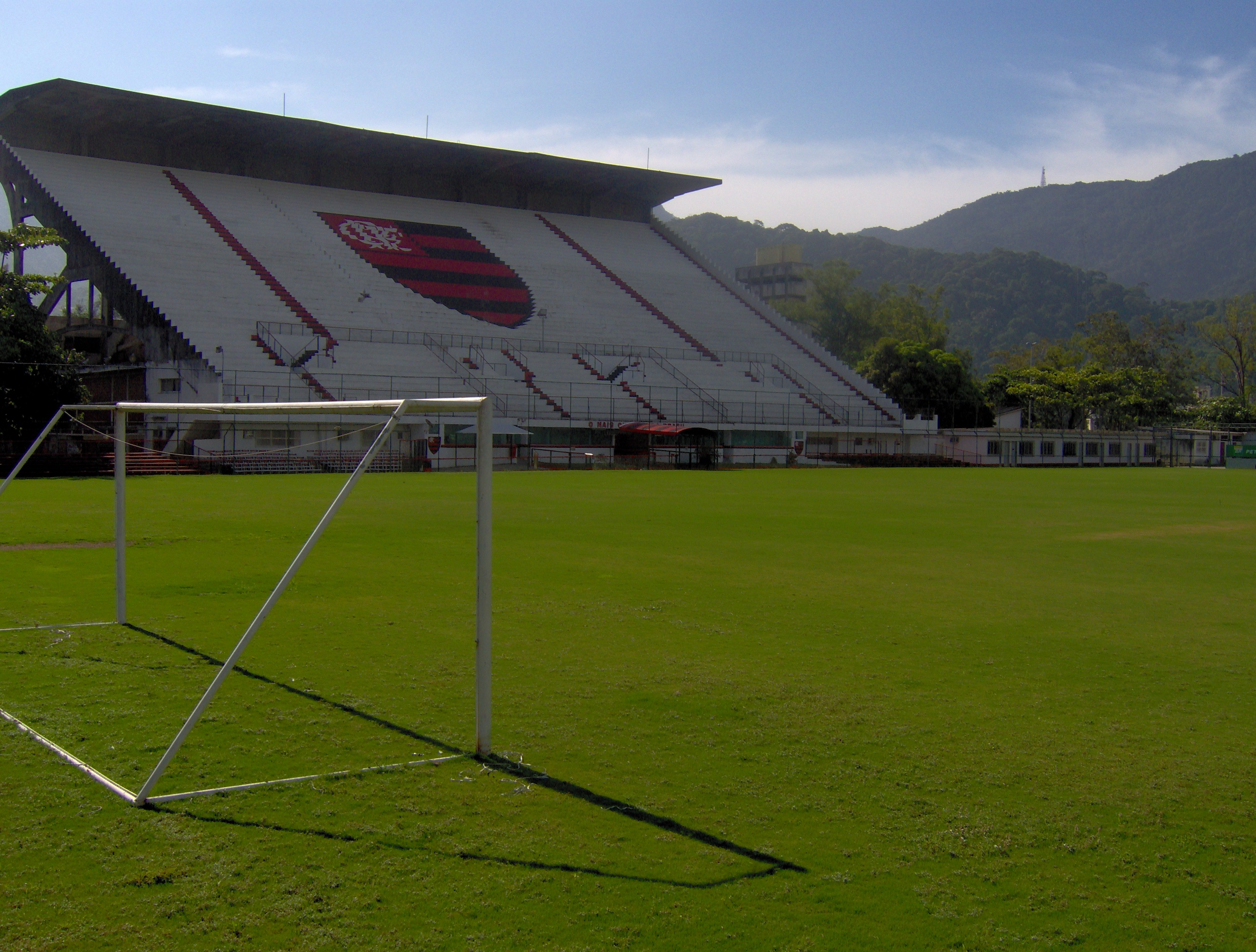
- Interactive map of Estádio da Gávea
- Full name: Estádio José Bastos Padilha
- Location: Rio de Janeiro
- Owner: Flamengo
- Capacity: 4,000
- Surface: Grass
- Scoreboard: No

Construction
- Groundbreaking: 1925
- Opened: September 4, 1938
- Renovated: 2000

Tenants
- Flamengo Youth Academy; Flamengo (women)

The Estádio da Gávea ("Gávea Stadium", in English), also known as Estádio José Bastos Padilha, is a football stadium, inaugurated on September 4, 1938, in the Lagoa neighborhood, of Rio de Janeiro, Brazil. It has a maximum capacity of 4,000 spectators, and is the home ground of Flamengo, its owner. Flamengo rarely plays at Estádio da Gávea. The club's most used stadium is Maracanã.

The stadium is named after José Bastos Padilha, Flamengo's president at the time of the stadium construction. He was Flamengo's president from 1933 to 1937.

== History ==
On November 4, 1931, Flamengo acquired rights to the Lagoa site. On December 28, 1933, Flamengo's president at the time, José Padilha, started construction of the stadium, which was inaugurated on September 4, 1938. The inaugural match was played on September 4, 1938, when Vasco beat Flamengo 2-0. The first goal of the stadium was scored by Vasco da Gama's Niginho.

The stadium's attendance record, currently stands at 8,882 spectators, was set on February 6, 1994, when Flamengo and Madureira drew 1–1.

Elton John gave a concert at the stadium on November 24, 1995 during his tour Made in England. There were more than 60,000 people. The concert was recorded and released in DVD called "Tantrums and Tiaras" a year later. The concert can be found also as "Live in Rio".

Metallica performed at the stadium during their Garage Remains The Same Tour on May 9, 1999.

In December 2000, the stadium's field was renovated.

During the 2014 World Cup, the Dutch National Team trained at Estádio da Gávea, in preparation for the competition.
