= Venezuela women's national rugby sevens team =

Venezuela
- Union: Venezuelan Rugby Federation
- Nickname: Las Orquídeas
- Emblem: Easter orchid (Cattleya mossiae)
- Coach: Marisell Méndez
Team kit

World Cup Sevens
- Appearances: 0

The Venezuela women's national rugby sevens team is Venezuela's representative team in rugby sevens for women. They competed at the 2015 CONSUR Women's Sevens, they placed third and qualified for the Olympic Repechage Tournament in Dublin. They also competed in the South American Women's Rugby Sevens Championship in Brazil in 2016.

== Tournament record ==
=== South American Women's Sevens ===
- 2004 - 2nd
- 2005 - 3rd
- 2007 - 3rd
- 2008 - 3rd
- 2009 - 3rd
- 2010 - 6th
- 2011 - 7th
- 2012 - 6th
- 2013 - 4th
- 2014 - 7th
- 2015 - 3rd
- 2016 - 4th

=== Pan American Games ===
- 2015: Did not qualify

=== Bolivarian Games ===
- 2013: 2nd

=== Central American and Caribbean Games ===
- 2014: 2nd

== Current squad ==
Squad to the 2016 South American Women's Sevens:

Player	Club
Nardelys Alvarado	Gacelas Rugby Club
Claudia Contreras	UCAB Rugby Club
Caring De Freitas	UCAB Rugby Club
Daniela Díaz	UCV Rugby Club
Jetsy Ferrera	UCV Rugby Club
Maryoly Gámez	UNET
Ingrid Griffin	Ángeles CRUM
Marianny Izarza	Gacelas Rugby Club
Mariana Romero	UCAB Rugby Club
Estafania Salami	Ángeles CRUM
Moureen Baloa	CRUSB
Carla Lanzarote	Gacelas Rugby Club

== See also ==
- Rugby union in Venezuela
- Venezuela national rugby union team
- Venezuela national rugby sevens team
