= Brazil women's national rugby sevens team =

Brazil
- Union: Brazilian Rugby Confederation
- Nickname: Yaras
- Coach: Will Broderick
- Captain: Luiza Campos
Team kit	Change kit

World Cup Sevens
- Appearances: 2 (First in 2009)
- Best result: 10th (2009)

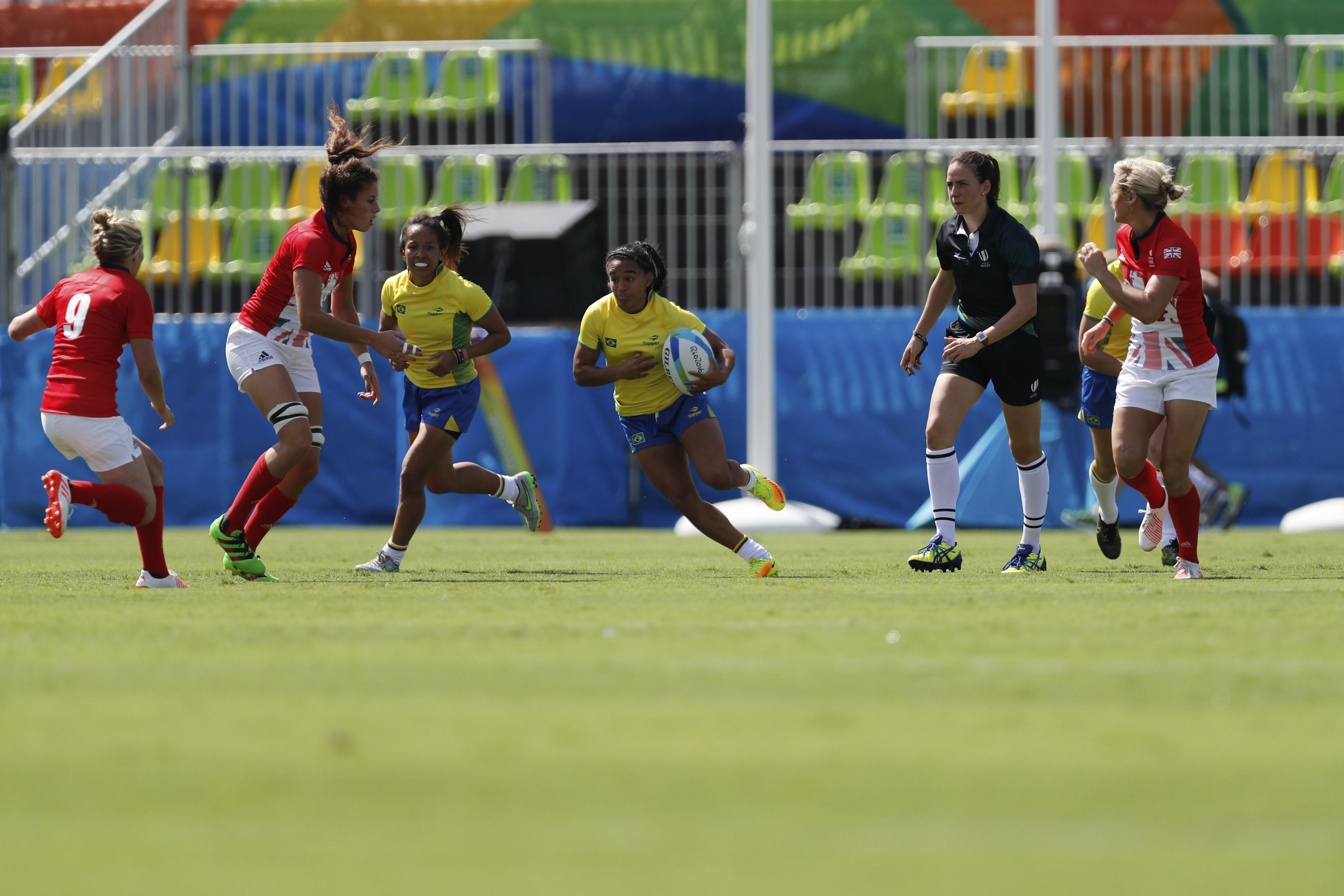
Brazil v. Great Britain

The Brazil women's national rugby sevens team has appeared in the Olympics, the Rugby World Cup, the Women's Sevens Series, and other competitions. Brazil has won every regional championship in South America. Their team nickname "Yaras" was coined in 2013, and comes from the local Tupí-Guaraní myth of the Iara. It was meant to signify the courage and collective strength of women's rugby in Brazil and also to connect them with their country's roots.

They qualified for the Tokyo Olympics after defeating Colombia in the finals of the 2019 Sudamérica Rugby Women's Sevens Olympic Qualifying Tournament. Brazil and Colombia qualified for the 2022 Rugby World Cup Sevens in South Africa.

== Tournament history ==
=== Summer Olympics ===
Olympic Games record
Year	Round	Position	Pld	W	L	D
(Brazil) 2016 Rio	9th Place Final	9th	5	3	2	0
(Japan) 2020 Tokyo	11th Place Final	11th	5	1	4	0
(France) 2024 Paris	9th Place Final	10th	5	1	4	0
Total	0 Titles	3/3	15	5	10	0

=== Rugby World Cup Sevens ===
Rugby World Cup Sevens record
Year	Round	Position	Pld	W	L	D
(United Arab Emirates) 2009	Bowl Finalists	10th	6	3	3	0
(Russia) 2013	Bowl Quarterfinalists	13th	4	1	3	0
(United States) 2018	Challenge Trophy Quarterfinalists	13th	4	2	2	0
(South Africa) 2022	11th-place Final	11th	4	2	2	0
Total	0 Titles	4/4	18	8	10	0

=== Pan American Games ===
Pan American Games record
Year	Round	Position	Pld	W	L	D
(Canada) 2015 Toronto	Bronze Medal Game	3rd	6	4	2	0
(Peru) 2019 Lima	Bronze Medal Game	4th	5	2	3	0
Total	0 Title	1/2	11	6	5	0

=== South American Games ===
South American Games record
Year	Round	Position	Pld	W	L	D
(Chile) 2014 Santiago	Gold Medal Game	1st	7	7	0	0
(Bolivia) 2018 Cochabamba	Gold Medal Game	1st	6	6	0	0
(Paraguay) 2022 Asunción	Gold Medal Game	1st	4	4	0	0
Total	3 titles	3/3	17	17	0	0

=== World Rugby Women's Sevens Series ===
Season	Round 1	Round 2	Round 3	Round 4	Round 5	Round 6	Position	Points
2012–13	(United Arab Emirates); Dubai; 12th	(United States); Houston; 9th Bowl Champion	(China); Guangzhou; 8th	(Netherlands); Amsterdam; 12th			10th	12
2013–14	(United Arab Emirates); Dubai; 8th	(United States); Atlanta; 11th	(Brazil); São Paulo; 10th Bowl Runners-up	(China); Guangzhou; 12th	(Netherlands); Amsterdam; 8th		9th	18
2014–15	(United Arab Emirates); Dubai; 9th Bowl Champion	(Brazil); São Paulo; 8th	(United States); Atlanta; 8th	(Canada); Victoria; 10th Bowl Runners-up	(England); London; 12th	(Netherlands); Amsterdam; Did not enter	10th	20
2015–16	(United Arab Emirates); Dubai; 10th Bowl Runners-up	(Brazil); São Paulo; 8th	(United States); Atlanta; Did not enter	(Canada); Victoria; 10th Bowl Runners-up	(France); Clermont-Ferrand; Did not enter		10th	12

=== IRB Women's Sevens Challenge Cup ===
Sevens Challenge Cup record
Year	Round	Position	Pld	W	L	D
(United Arab Emirates) 2011 Dubai	5th to 8th Place	8th	5	0	5	0
2012 Hong Kong	Bowl Final	9th (Bowl Champion)	4	2	2	0
(England) 2012 London	Bowl	12th	5	1	4	0
Total	0 Titles	3/3	14	3	11	0

=== Sudamérica Rugby Women's Sevens ===
Sudamérica Rugby Women's Sevens
Year	Round	Position	Pld	W	L	D
(Peru) 2019 Lima	Gold Medal Game	1st	6	6	0	0

== Squad ==
=== Current team ===
2023–24 Series
Player	Date of birth (age)	Matches	Points
Luiza Campos	30 July 1990 (age 36)	187	161
Gabriela Lima	2 September 1994 (age 32)	55	162
Andressa Alves	9 December 2000 (age 25)	58	40
Marina Fioravanti	6 October 1993 (age 33)	79	27
Mariana Nicolau	16 November 1997 (age 28)	119	87
Gisele Gomes	18 August 2003 (age 23)	29	14
Bianca Silva	22 July 1998 (age 28)	123	305
Milena Mariano	28 January 2000 (age 26)	29	15
Thalia Costa	30 May 1997 (age 29)	103	340
Thalita Costa	30 May 1997 (age 29)	36	5
Aline Ribeiro Furtado	2 October 1995 (age 31)	64	5
Rafaela Zanellato	25 November 1999 (age 26)	90	90
Yasmim Soares	5 May 1999 (age 27)	6	0

=== Award winners ===
The following Brazil Sevens players have been recognised at the World Rugby Awards since 2013:

World Rugby Women's 7s Dream Team
Year	No.	Player
2025	2.	Thalia Costa

== See also ==
- Brazil national rugby sevens team
