= Colombia women's national rugby sevens team =

Colombia
- Union: Colombian Rugby Federation
- Nickname: Las tucanes (The toucans)
- Coach: Laurent Palau
- Captain: Alejandra Betancur
Team kit	Change kit

World Cup
- Appearances: 0

The Colombia women's national rugby sevens team represents Colombia in international women's rugby sevens competitions.

Colombia placed second at the 2019 Sudamérica Olympic Qualifying Tournament in Peru, earning them a place at the final qualification tournament. They were knocked out of the Qualifier semi-finals at the 2020 Final Olympic Qualification Tournament by France. Colombia qualified for their first Sevens World Cup after finishing as runners-up at the 2021 Sudamérica Rugby Women's Sevens.

In addition to their Olympic and World Cup Sevens participation, the team won the inaugural women's rugby sevens title at the 2013 Bolivarian Games in Trujillo, Peru, successfully defended it in 2017 in Santa Marta, finished runners-up to Paraguay in 2022 in Valledupar, and reclaimed the title in 2024 and again at the 2025 Bolivarian Games in Ayacucho–Lima, Peru.

At the Central American and Caribbean Games, Colombia won gold on debut in 2014 in Veracruz, Mexico, and defended the title in 2018 (Barranquilla), 2023 (San Salvador), and 2026 (Santo Domingo), extending their unbeaten run to four consecutive editions.

Colombia also won the 2015 South American Women's Sevens undefeated, a result which secured their place at the 2016 Summer Olympics.

== Tournament history ==
=== Summer Olympics ===
Olympic Games record
Year	Round	Position	Pld	W	L	D
(Brazil) 2016	Placement round	12th	5	0	5	0
(Japan) 2020	Did not qualify					
(France) 2024	Did not qualify					
Total	0 Titles	1/1	5	0	5	0

=== Rugby World Cup Sevens ===
Rugby World Cup Sevens record
Year	Round	Position	Pld	W	L	D
(United Arab Emirates) 2009	Did not qualify					
(Russia) 2013	Did not qualify					
(United States) 2018	Did not qualify					
(South Africa) 2022	15th-place Final	16th	4	0	4	0
Total	0 Titles	1/4	4	0	4	0

=== Pan American Games ===
Pan American Games record
Year	Round	Position	Pld	W	L	D
(Canada) 2015	5th playoff	5th equal	6	1	3	2
(Peru) 2019	Semifinals	3rd place, bronze medalist(s)	5	3	2	0
Total	0 Titles	1/1	6	1	2	3

== Players ==
=== Previous squad ===
Squad to 2016 Summer Olympics

The following is the Colombia roster in the women's rugby sevens tournament of the 2016 Summer Olympics.

Head coach: Laurent Palau

Backs		Forwards
2	Nathalie Marchino	1	Nicole Acevedo
4	Khaterinne Medina	3	Alejandra Betancur (c)
6	Isabel Romero	5	Ana Ramírez
8	Solangie Delgado	7	Estefanía Ramírez
9	Camila Lopera	10	Guadalupe López
11	Sharon Acevedo
12	Laura González
