= Argentina women's national rugby sevens team =

Argentina
- Union: Argentine Rugby Union
- Nickname: Las Yaguaretés
- Ground: José Amalfitani Stadium
- Coach: Nahuel Garcia
Team kit	Change kit

Official website
- uar.com.ar/category/femenino/

The Argentina women's national rugby sevens team has been the second most successful team in South America after Brazil. At the CONSUR Women's Sevens, Argentina has been runner-up three times.

== History ==
They have won the 2012, 2013 and 2015 Seven de la República. Argentina participated in the 2015 Hong Kong Women's Sevens, becoming the 38th nation to compete in Hong Kong since 1997. They were pooled with Canada, Samoa and Mexico.

The team qualified to the 2016 Final Olympic Qualification Tournament. They were knocked out of the Cup quarter-finals by Russia. Argentina competed at the 2019 Sudamérica Olympic Qualifying Tournament in Peru, finishing in third place and qualifying for the Repechage tournament in Monaco.

Argentina announced ahead of the 2021 Sudamérica Women's Sevens that their new nickname was Las Yaguaretés. In 2024, they participated in the World Rugby Sevens Challenger Series; they placed third in the first round of the series which took place in Dubai. They finished as runners-up at the 2024 Sevens Challenger Series and secured their place at the new SVNS Play-off promotion and relegation competition in Madrid.

== Players ==
Argentina's squad to the 2024 World Rugby Sevens Challenger Series:

Players
Gimena Mattus
Maria Taladrid
María Paula Pedrozo
Azul Medina
Andrea Moreno
Candela Delgado
Maria Brigido Chamorro
Sofia Gonzalez
Micaela Pallero
Talia Rodich
Malena Noemi Diaz
Mayra Genghini
