= Chile women's national rugby sevens team =

Chile
- Union: Chilean Rugby Federation
- Coach: Edmundo Olfos
Team kit	Change kit

World Cup Sevens
- Appearances: 0

The Chile women's national rugby union sevens team is a Rugby sevens national women's side that represents Chile.

At the 2022 Sudamérica Rugby Women's Sevens, Chile finished fifth overall.

== Tournament history ==
=== World Rugby Sevens Challenger Series ===
- 2022 - 10th (hosts)

=== Pan American Games ===
- Santiago 2023 - 7th (hosts)

=== South American Games ===
- 2014 - 6th
- 2018 - DNP
- 2022 - 5th
- 2026 - 5th

=== Bolivarian Games ===
- 2022 - 2nd

=== South American Championship ===
- 2004 - 6th
- 2005 - 5th
- 2007 - 5th
- 2008 - 6th
- 2009 - 6th
- 2010 - 5th
- 2011 - 3rd
- 2012 - 5th
- 2013 - 6th
- 2015 - 6th
- 2016 - 6th
- 2017 (Villa Carlos Paz) - 6th
- 2017 (Montevideo) - 6th
- 2018 - 5th
- 2019 (Asunción) - 3rd
- 2019 (Lima) - 6th
- 2019 (Montevideo) - 6th
- 2020 - 6th
- 2021 - 6th
- 2022 - 5th
- 2023 (Montevideo) - 5th
- 2023 (Asunción) - 3rd
- 2024 - 5th
- 2025 - 6th
- 2026 - 7th

== Team ==
=== 2026 South American Games ===
(Chile) Manque VII
Beatriz Araneda
Gissel Castañeda
Pier Angela Colombo
Paz Cortés
Javiera Fuentes
Joaquina Herrera
Carla Jorquera
Geraldine Lagos
Sofía Martinez
Anaís Miranda
Valeria Vera
Catalina Villarroel
DT: Ivo Filco

== See also ==
- Chile women's national rugby union team
- Chile national rugby sevens team
