= Rugby Americas North Women's Sevens =

Regional championship

Americas North Women's 7s
- Most recent season or competition: 2024 RAN Women's Sevens
- Sport: Rugby sevens
- Founded: 2005; 21 years ago
- Countries: 8 (in 2013)
- Most recent champion: Mexico (2024)
- Most titles: Mexico (6 titles)

The Rugby Americas North Women's Sevens (RAN Women's Sevens) is the regional championship for women's international rugby sevens in North America and the Caribbean. The tournament is held over two days, typically on a weekend in November. It is sanctioned and sponsored by Rugby Americas North, which is the governing body for the region. Prior to 2016, it was referred to as the North America and Caribbean Women's Sevens (NACRA Women's Sevens).

== History ==
The first international sevens championship for women's teams from North America and the Caribbean was held in Barbados in 2005. The tournament was run by the North America and West Indies Rugby Association (NAWIRA), which later became the North America Caribbean Rugby Association (NACRA) before adopting its current name of Rugby Americas North in 2016. The regional 7s championships have periodically served as pre-qualifying competitions for the Rugby World Cup Sevens, the Summer Olympic Games, and other tournaments.

The following are details of all regional women's international championships played in North America and the Caribbean, listed chronologically with the earliest first, with all result details, where known (included are the NACRA Women's Sevens and other official regional championships, e.g. NAWIRA Women's Sevens tournaments).

== Honours ==
Year	Location	Winner	Refs
NAWIRA Women's 7s
2005	Garrison Savannah, Barbados	United States	
2006	Garrison Savannah, Barbados	USA Development Eagles	
2007	Nassau, Bahamas	Canada	
2008	Nassau, Bahamas	United States	
NACRA Women's 7s
2009	Mexico City, Mexico	Guyana	
2010	Georgetown, Guyana	Guyana	
2011	Garrison Savannah Racetrack, Barbados	Maple Leafs	
2012	Twin Elm Rugby Park, Canada	Canada	
2013	Truman Bodden Sports Complex, Cayman Islands	Maple Leafs	
2014	Mexico City, Mexico	Mexico	
2015	Cary, North Carolina, United States	United States	
RAN Women's 7s
2016	Port of Spain, Trinidad and Tobago	Maple Leafs	
2017	Mexico City, Mexico	Mexico	
2018	Saint James, Barbados	Mexico	
2019	George Town, Cayman Islands	Mexico	
No tournaments in 2020 and 2021 due to impacts of the COVID-19 pandemic.
2022 (Apr)	Nassau, Bahamas	Canada	
2022 (Nov)	Mexico City, Mexico	Mexico	
2023	Langford, British Columbia, Canada	Canada	
2024	Arima, Trinidad and Tobago	Mexico	

=== Team records ===
Team	Champions	Runners-up	Third
Mexico	6 (2014, 2017, 2018, 2019, 2022–Nov, 2024)	4 (2013, 2015, 2022–Apr, 2023)	3 (2009, 2012, 2016)
Canada	4 (2007, 2012, 2022–Apr, 2023)	—	—
United States	3 (2005, 2008, 2015)	1 (2008)	—
Guyana	2 (2009, 2010)	—	1 (2008)
Trinidad and Tobago	—	5 (2005, 2010, 2012, 2014, 2018)	7 (2006, 2011, 2013, 2015, 2022–Apr, 2022–Nov, 2024)
Jamaica	—	6 (2006, 2011, 2016, 2019, 2022–Nov, 2024)	8 (2005, 2007, 2010, 2012, 2017, 2018, 2022–Apr, 2023)
Saint Lucia	—	1 (2009)	1 (2019)
Cayman Islands	—	—	1 (2014)
French Guiana	—	1 (2017)	—
Non-International Teams
Maple Leafs	3 (2011, 2013, 2016)	—	—
USA Development Eagles	1 (2006)	1 (2007)	—
