= 2018 Hong Kong Women's Sevens =

- Women's Sevens Series VI
- Host nation: Hong Kong
- Date: 5–6 April 2018

Cup
- Champion: China
- Runner-up: South Africa

Tournament details
- Matches played: 25

The 2018 Hong Kong Women's Sevens acted not only as a qualifier for the 2018–19 World Rugby Women's Sevens Series, but also for seeding purposes for the 2018 Rugby World Cup Sevens for five of the teams. The tournament was played on 5–6 April 2018 with pool stage matches played at So Kon Po Rec Ground with knock-out stage matches played at the Hong Kong Stadium in Hong Kong alongside the 2018 Hong Kong Sevens for men.

== Continental qualifying ==
Teams will qualify for the World Series Qualifier tournament based on continental championships. The top teams from each continent that are not already core teams will qualify. Teams in bold also qualified for the 2018 Rugby World Cup Sevens.

Continental Sevens Championship	Dates	Venue(s)	Berths	Qualified
2017 Rugby Europe Women's Sevens Grand Prix Series	3 June– 16 July 2017	(France) Malemort, (Russia) Kazan	3	Wales; Belgium; Poland
2017 Women's Africa Cup Sevens	16–17 September 2017	(Tunisia) Monastir	2	**South Africa**; Kenya
2017 Asia Rugby Women's Sevens Series	23 September– 14 October 2017	(South Korea) Incheon, (Sri Lanka) Colombo	3	**China**; Kazakhstan; Hong Kong
2017 Oceania Women's Sevens Championship	10–11 November 2017	(Fiji) Suva	1	**Papua New Guinea**
2017 Torneo Valentín Martinez (Sudamérica)	10–11 November 2017	(Uruguay) Montevideo	2	**Brazil**; Argentina
2017 RAN Women's Sevens	25–26; November 2017	Mexico City	1	**Mexico**
Total			12	

== Format ==
12 teams, split into three groups of four. The group winners, runners up and the two best third ranked teams will enter the knockout stage. The overall winner will gain a spot on the 2018–19 World Rugby Women's Sevens series.

== Pool Stage ==
All times in Hong Kong Time (UTC+08:00). The games as scheduled are as follows:

Key to colours in group tables
Teams that advanced to the Cup Quarterfinal

=== Pool X ===
Team	Pld	W	D	L	PF	PA	PD	Pts
Kenya	3	3	0	0	81	17	+64	**9**
South Africa	3	2	0	1	69	41	+28	**7**
Papua New Guinea	3	1	0	2	49	48	+1	**5**
Mexico	3	0	0	3	5	98	–93	**3**

5 April 2018	**Kenya**	**17–5**	**Papua New Guinea**	So Kon Po Rec Ground, Hong Kong
10:30	Try: Chajira 7'c Nziwa 11'm Olando 12'c Con: Owino (2/3) 7', 12'		Try: Lagona 8'm Con: Lagona (0/1); Cards: Abau (yellow card) 10' to 12'	Referee: (South Africa) Ashleigh Murray

5 April 2018	**South Africa**	**31–0**	**Mexico**	So Kon Po Rec Ground, Hong Kong
10:52	Try: Mpupha 1'm Roos 3'm, 5'c Mali 10'c Jordaan 13'c Con: Stadler (2/2) 5', 13'; Roos (1/3) 10'; Cards: Mali (yellow card) 14' to 14'; Ndawonde (yellow card) 14' to 14'		Cards: Carrillo (yellow card) 10' to 12'	Referee: (England) Katherine Ritchie

5 April 2018	**Kenya**	**40–0**	**Mexico**	So Kon Po Rec Ground, Hong Kong
13:04	Try: Okelo 4'c Masinde 6'c, 12'c Chajira 7'c, 14'm Nziwa 8'c Con: Nziwa (1/1) 4'; Owino (4/4) 6', 7', 9', 13'; Okulu (0/1)			Referee: (New Zealand) Lauren Jenner

5 April 2018	**South Africa**	**26–17**	**Papua New Guinea**	So Kon Po Rec Ground, Hong Kong
13:26	Try: Simmers 3'c Mpupha 9'c Roos 11'm Mali 13'c Con: Jordaan (3/4) 4', 10', 13'		Try: Lagona 1'm Rama 7'm Biyama 14'c Con: Lavai (1/1)14'; Lagona (0/2); Cards: Lagona (yellow card) 3' to 5'	Referee: (Australia) Maddy Putz

5 April 2018	**Papua New Guinea**	**27–5**	**Mexico**	So Kon Po Rec Ground, Hong Kong
15:38	Try: Griffins 2'm Rama 6'm Lagona 7'm, 8'm Kaore 14'c Con: Lagona (1/4) 14'; Gittins (0/1); Cards: Sampson (yellow card) 5' to 7'		Try: Angulo 13'm Con: Gonzalez (0/1)	Referee: (Australia) Tyler Miller

5 April 2018	**South Africa**	**12–24**	**Kenya**	So Kon Po Rec Ground, Hong Kong
16:00	Try: Webb 4'm Grain 14'c Con: Jordaan (1/1) 14'; Mpupha (0/1)		Try: Omondi 2'm, 10'c Okelo 6'c, 12'm Con: Nziwa (1/1) 6'; Owino (1/3) 11'	Referee: (United States) Emily Hsieh

=== Pool Y ===
Team	Pld	W	D	L	PF	PA	PD	Pts
China	3	3	0	0	64	19	+45	**9**
Brazil	3	2	0	1	65	41	+24	**7**
Hong Kong	3	1	0	2	24	69	–45	**5**
Kazakhstan	3	0	0	3	29	53	–24	**3**

5 April 2018	**China**	**14–7**	**Kazakhstan**	So Kon Po Rec Ground, Hong Kong
11:14	Try: Gao 5'c Liu 14'; Con: Yu (2/2) 5', 14'		Try: Tkacheva 7'c Con: Baktybayeva (1/1) 7'	Referee: (New Zealand) Lauren Jenner

5 April 2018	**Brazil**	**38–0**	**Hong Kong**	So Kon Po Rec Ground, Hong Kong
11:36	Try: B Silva 3'c, 10'c L Silva 7'm Muhlbauer 8'c Zanellato 12'm, 14'c Con: Kochhann (4/6) 4', 8', 10', 14'			Referee: (Australia) Maddy Putz

5 April 2018	**China**	**19–7**	**Hong Kong**	So Kon Po Rec Ground, Hong Kong
13:48	Try: Chen 2'c Yang 3'm Liu 8'c Con: Yang (1/2) 2'; Chen 8'; Cards: Sun (yellow card) 14' to 14'		Try: Nam 14'c Con: Chan (1/1) 14'	Referee: (Australia) Tyler Miller

5 April 2018	**Brazil**	**22–10**	**Kazakhstan**	So Kon Po Rec Ground, Hong Kong
14:10	Try: B Silva 7'm Araujo 9'c, 12'm Zanellato 14'm Con: Kochhan (1/4) 9'; Cards: Araujo (yellow card) 4' to 6'		Try: Proskurina 4'm Tkacheva 6'm Con: Baktybayeva (0/2)	Referee: (United States) Emily Hsieh

5 April 2018	**Kazakhstan**	**12–17**	**Hong Kong**	So Kon Po Rec Ground, Hong Kong
16:22	Try: Tkacheva 3'c, 5'm Con: Baktybayeva (1/2) 4'; Cards: Korotkih (yellow card) 1' to 3'; Proskurina (yellow card) 14' to !4'		Try: Nam 1'm Olson-Thorne 7'm Poon 8'c Con: Tjosvold (1/3) 8'	Referee: (England) Katherine Ritchie

5 April 2018	**Brazil**	**5–31**	**China**	So Kon Po Rec Ground, Hong Kong
16:44	Try: Kochhann 3'c Con: Kochhann (0/1)		Try: Yang 1'c Wang 4'c, 9'c Yu 7'm Chen 8'm Con: Yu (3/5) 1', 5', 9'	Referee: (South Africa) Ashleigh Murray

=== Pool Z ===
Team	Pld	W	D	L	PF	PA	PD	Pts
Belgium	3	3	0	0	43	5	+38	**9**
Wales	3	2	0	1	71	34	+37	**7**
Argentina	3	1	0	2	26	64	–38	**5**
Poland	3	0	0	3	22	59	–37	**3**

5 April 2018	**Belgium**	**12–0**	**Argentina**	So Kon Po Rec Ground, Hong Kong
11:58	Try: Blondiau 4'm Rosier 13'c Con: D'Haeseleir (1/2) 13'			Referee: (Australia) Tyler Miller

5 April 2018	**Wales**	**19–17**	**Poland**	So Kon Po Rec Ground, Hong Kong
12:20	Try: Joyce 1'm, 3'c Harries 9'c Con: Snowsill (2/3) 4', 9'		Try: Klichowska 4'c Paszczyk 7'm, 13'm Con: Jaszczyszyn (1/3) 5'	Referee: (United States) Emily Hsieh

5 April 2018	**Belgium**	**19–0**	**Poland**	So Kon Po Rec Ground, Hong Kong
14:32	Try: Blondlau 4'c, 7'c, 10'm Con: D'Haeseleir (2/3) 4', 7'			Referee: (England) Katherine Ritchie

5 April 2018	**Wales**	**47–5**	**Argentina**	So Kon Po Rec Ground, Hong Kong
14:54	Try: Powell 6'c Williams 7'; Joyce 8'c, 8'c, 13'c Powell-Hughes 10'c Snowsill 11'c Con: Jones (3/3) 6', 9', 13'; Snowsill (3/3) 8', 11', 11'		Try: Padellaro 1'm Con: Gonzalez (0/1)	Referee: (South Africa) Ashleigh Murray

5 April 2018	**Argentina**	**21–5**	**Poland**	So Kon Po Rec Ground, Hong Kong
17:06	Try: Gonzalez 2'c Agullar 7'c Pedrozo 9'c Con: Gonzalez (3/3) 2', 7', 10'		Try: Kowalczyk 14'm Con: Paszczyk (0/1); Cards: Paszczyk (yellow card) 11' to 13'	Referee: (New Zealand) Lauren Jenner

5 April 2018	**Wales**	**5–12**	**Belgium**	So Kon Po Rec Ground, Hong Kong
17:28	Try: Joyce 11'm Con: Snowsill (0/1)		Try: Lalli 4'c D'Haeseleir 14'm Con: D'Haeseleir (1/2) 4'	Referee: (Australia) Maddy Putz

== Knockout stage ==
Quarter-finals
6 April 2017 – 10:30 – Hong Kong Stadium
**China**	31
Papua New Guinea	10
6 April 2017 – 10:52 – Hong Kong Stadium
**Belgium**	17
Brazil	12
6 April 2017 – 11:14 – Hong Kong Stadium
Wales	0
**South Africa**	26
6 April 2017 – 11:36 – Hong Kong Stadium
**Kenya**	17 (a.e.t.)
Argentina	12

Semi-finals
6 April 2017 – 14:12 – Hong Kong Stadium
**China**	22
Belgium	5
6 April 2017 – 14:34 – Hong Kong Stadium
**South Africa**	12 (a.e.t.)
Kenya	7

World Series Qualifier Final
6 April 2017 – 17:12 – Hong Kong Stadium
**China**	31
South Africa	14

Matches

**Quarter-finals**

6 April 2018	**China**	**31–10**	**Papua New Guinea**	Hong Kong Stadium
10:30	Try: Yu 1'm, 7'c, 8'c Xu 13'm Wang 14'; Con: Yu (2/4) 7', 8'; Chen 14'		Try: Kaore 3'm Lagona 5'm Con: Lagona (0/2); Cards: Lagona (yellow card) 8' to 10'; Laval (yellow card) 13' to 14'	Referee: (Australia) Maddy Putz

6 April 2018	**Belgium**	**17–12**	**Brazil**	Hong Kong Stadium
10:52	Try: Stevins 2', 5'm Musch 14'c Con: D'Haeseleir (1/2) 14'		Try: B Silva 3'c Muhlbauer 13'm Con: Cerullo (1/1) 4'; Kochhann (0/1)	Referee: (United States) Emily Hsieh

6 April 2018	**Wales**	**0–26**	**South Africa**	Hong Kong Stadium
11:14	Con: Harries (yellow card) 9' to 11'		Try: Pienaar 2'c Roos 6'm Jordaan 12'm Grain 14'c Con: Jordaan (2/3) 3', 7'; Stadler 14'	Referee: (New Zealand) Lauren Jenner

6 April 2018	**Kenya**	**17–12** **(a.e.t.)**	**Argentina**	Hong Kong Stadium
11:36	Try: Omondi 7'm Okelo 8'c Nziwa 22'; Con: Nziwa (1/2) 8'		Try: Gonzalez 3'm, 11'c Con: Gonzalez (1/2) 12'	Referee: (England) Katherine Ritchie

**Semi-finals**

6 April 2018	**China**	**22–5**	**Belgium**	Hong Kong Stadium
14:12	Try: Yang 1'c Yu 2'm Chen 11'm Wang 12'c Con: Yu (1/4) 13'		Try: Lalli 6'; Con: D'Haeseleir (0/1)	Referee: (South Africa) Ashleigh Murray

6 April 2018	**South Africa**	**12–7** **(a.e.t.)**	**Kenya**	Hong Kong Stadium
14:34	Try: Jordaan 11'c Ndawonde 17'; Con: Jordaan (1/1) 11'		Try: Okelo 13'c Con: Nziwa (1/1) 14'; Cards: Mbogo (yellow card) 14' to 14'	Referee: (Australia) Tyler Miller

**World Series Qualifier Final**

6 April 2018	**China**	**31–14**	**South Africa**	Hong Kong Stadium
17:12	Try: Chen 5'c, 7'm, 9'c Yang 8'm Wang 13'; Con: Yu (2/4) 6', 14'; Chen (1/1) 9'		Try: Mali 4'c Comley 11'c Con: Jordaan (2/2) 4', 11'	Referee: (Australia) Tyler Miller

== See also ==
- 2018 Hong Kong Sevens
- 2017-18 World Rugby Women's Sevens Series
- 2018 Rugby World Cup Sevens – Women's tournament

Hong Kong Women's Sevens
Preceded by 2017 Hong Kong Women's Sevens	2018 Hong Kong Women's Sevens	Succeeded by 2019 Hong Kong Women's Sevens
