= 2016 RAN Women's Sevens =

- Hosts: Trinidad and Tobago
- Date: 12–13 November

Final positions
- Champions: Canada
- Runners-up: Jamaica
- Third: Mexico

The 2016 RAN Women's Sevens Championship was the twelfth tournament of the RAN Women's Sevens, the official rugby sevens continental championships organized by RAN. Both the women's and men's competitions were held at Saint Mary's College, Trinidad and Tobago in Port of Spain on 12–13 November 2016.

Ten national teams competed in the women's tournament. Jamaica as the best placed non-core team qualified to compete at 2017 Hong Kong Women's Sevens to compete for a spot on the World Series.

== Pool stage ==
Key to colours in group tables
Teams that advance to the Cup semi-final
Teams that advance to the 5th-8th ranking semi-final

=== Pool A ===
Teams	Pld	W	D	L	PF	PA	+/−	Pts
Canada	4	4	0	0	203	0	+203	12
Jamaica	4	3	0	1	65	40	+25	10
Cayman Islands	4	2	0	2	36	76	-40	8
Bermuda	4	1	0	3	19	95	-76	6
Turks and Caicos Islands	4	0	0	4	5	115	-110	4

November 12, 2016
10:44

Canada	52 – 0	Bermuda

November 12, 2016
10:44

Jamaica	19 – 0	Cayman Islands

November 12, 2016
12:34

Jamaica	25 – 0	Turks and Caicos Islands

November 12, 2016
12:34

Canada	52 – 0	Cayman Islands

November 12, 2016
14:24

Canada	59 – 0	Turks and Caicos Islands

November 12, 2016
14:24

Jamaica	21 – 0	Bermuda

November 13, 2016
08:30

Cayman Islands	22 – 0	Bermuda

November 13, 2016
08:52

Canada	40 – 0	Jamaica

November 13, 2016
09:58

Turks and Caicos Islands	5 – 14	Cayman Islands

November 13, 2016
11:20

Turks and Caicos Islands	0 – 19	Bermuda

=== Pool B ===
Teams	Pld	W	D	L	PF	PA	+/−	Pts
Trinidad and Tobago	4	4	0	0	87	7	+80	12
Mexico	4	3	0	1	80	24	+54	10
Guyana	4	2	0	2	24	37	-13	7
Bahamas	4	1	0	3	17	69	-52	6
Dominican Republic	4	0	0	4	5	76	-71	4

12 November 2016
11:06

Mexico	33-0	Bahamas

12 November 2016
11:06

Trinidad and Tobago	12-0	Guyana

12 November 2016
12:56

Trinidad and Tobago	27-0	Dominican Republic

12 November 2016
12:56

Mexico	20-0	Guyana

12 November 2016
14:46

Mexico	27-0	Dominican Republic

12 November 2016
15:08

Trinidad and Tobago	24-7	Bahamas

13 November 2016
08:30

Guyana	12-0	Bahamas

13 November 2016
08:52

Mexico	0-24	Trinidad and Tobago

13 November 2016
09:58

Dominican Republic	5-12	Guyana

13 November 2016
11:20

Dominican Republic	0-10	Bahamas

== Knockout stage ==
5th-8th Place

Semi-finals
13 November 2016 – 13:32
Cayman Islands	0
Bahamas	7
13 November 2016 – 13:32
Guyana	24
Bermuda	0

Final
13 November 2016 - 14:52
Bahamas	12
Guyana	17
Third place
13 November 2016 - 14:52
Cayman Islands	19
Bermuda	0

Cup

Semi-finals
13 November 2016 – 12:48
Canada	43
Mexico	0
13 November – 12:48
Trinidad and Tobago	5
Jamaica	10

Final
13 November 2016 - 16:20
Canada	41
Jamaica	0
Third place
13 November 2016 - 15:14
Mexico	12
Trinidad and Tobago	5

== Final standings ==
Rank	Team
Gold medal	Canada
Silver medal	Jamaica
Bronze medal	Mexico
4	Trinidad and Tobago
5	Guyana
6	Bahamas
7	Cayman Islands
8	Bermuda
9*	Dominican Republic
9*	Turks and Caicos Islands

- The 9th place playoff between Dominican Republic and Turks and Caicos Islands was cancelled.
