= 2011 NACRA Women's Sevens =

- Hosts: Barbados
- Date: 12–13 November 2011
- Nations: 11

Final positions
- Champions: Maple Leafs
- Runners-up: Jamaica
- Third: Trinidad and Tobago

Series details
- Matches played: 37

The 2011 NACRA Women's Sevens was the seventh edition of the NACRA Women's Sevens and was held on 12 and 13 November 2011 at Bridgetown, Barbados. The Maple Leafs from Canada defeated Jamaica in the Cup final to win the tournament.

== Teams ==
Eleven teams competed in the tournament:

- Barbados
- Cayman Islands
- Guadeloupe
- Guyana
- Jamaica
- Maple Leafs
- Mexico
- Saint Lucia
- Saint Vincent
- Trinidad and Tobago
- USA South

== Pool Stages ==
=== Pool A ===
Nation	P	W	D	L	PF	PA	PD	Pts	
USA South	4	4	0	0	74	14	+60	12	Qualified for Cup Quarter-finals
Guyana	4	2	1	1	56	19	+37	9	Qualified for Cup Quarter-finals
Saint Lucia	4	2	1	1	27	24	+3	9	Qualified for Cup Quarter-finals
Mexico	4	1	0	3	5	29	–24	6	Qualified for Cup Quarter-finals
Barbados	4	0	0	4	0	76	–76	4	Qualified for Bowl Playoff

12 November 2011

Guyana	5–0	Mexico

Garrison Historic Area

12 November 2011

Saint Lucia	7–19	USA South

Garrison Historic Area

12 November 2011

Mexico	0–19	USA South

Garrison Historic Area

12 November 2011

Saint Lucia	10–0	Barbados

Garrison Historic Area

12 November 2011

Guyana	7–14	USA South

Garrison Historic Area

12 November 2011

Mexico	5–0	Barbados

Garrison Historic Area

12 November 2011

USA South	22–0	Barbados

Garrison Historic Area

12 November 2011

Guyana	5–5	Saint Lucia

Garrison Historic Area

13 November 2011

Guyana	39–0	Barbados

Garrison Historic Area

13 November 2011

Saint Lucia	5–0	Mexico

Garrison Historic Area

=== Pool B ===
Nation	P	W	D	L	PF	PA	PD	Pts	
Maple Leafs	4	4	0	0	176	5	+171	12	Qualified for Cup Quarter-finals
Trinidad and Tobago	4	3	0	1	101	26	+75	10	Qualified for Cup Quarter-finals
Jamaica	4	3	0	1	62	38	+24	10	Qualified for Cup Quarter-finals
Cayman Islands	4	1	0	3	22	94	–72	6	Qualified for Cup Quarter-finals
Guadeloupe	4	1	0	3	17	106	–89	6	Qualified for Bowl Playoff
Saint Vincent and the Grenadines	4	0	0	4	10	119	–109	4	Qualified for Bowl Playoff

12 November 2011

Trinidad and Tobago	50–0	Saint Vincent

Garrison Historic Area

12 November 2011

Jamaica	15–0	Guadeloupe

Garrison Historic Area

12 November 2011

Maple Leafs	52–0	Guadeloupe

Garrison Historic Area

12 November 2011

Cayman Islands	22–5	Saint Vincent

Garrison Historic Area

12 November 2011

Trinidad and Tobago	12–0	Cayman Islands

Garrison Historic Area

12 November 2011

Jamaica	0–38	Maple Leafs

Garrison Historic Area

12 November 2011

Trinidad and Tobago	5–26	Maple Leafs

Garrison Historic Area

12 November 2011

Jamaica	17–0	Cayman Islands

Garrison Historic Area

12 November 2011

Jamaica	30–0	Saint Vincent

Garrison Historic Area

13 November 2011

Trinidad and Tobago	34–0	Guadeloupe

Garrison Historic Area

13 November 2011

Cayman Islands	0–60	Maple Leafs

Garrison Historic Area

13 November 2011

Saint Vincent	5–17	Guadeloupe

Garrison Historic Area

== Classification Stages ==
=== Cup Quarter-finals ===
Quarter-finals
USA South	31
Cayman Islands	0
Maple Leafs	26
Mexico	0
Jamaica	15
Guyana	10
Trinidad and Tobago	5
Saint Lucia	0

Semi-finals
USA South	5
Jamaica	26
Maple Leafs	17
Trinidad and Tobago	0

Cup Final
Maple Leafs	38
Jamaica	0
3rd Place
Trinidad and Tobago	14
USA South	10

=== Plate Semi-finals ===
Semi-finals
Mexico 5-10 St Lucia
Cayman Islands	5
Guyana	10
Mexico	5
Saint Lucia	10

Plate Final
Guyana	26
Saint Lucia	0
7th Place
Mexico	27
Cayman Islands	10

=== Bowl Playoff ===
Nation	P	W	D	L	PF	PA	PD	Pts
Guadeloupe	2	1	1	0	19	15	+4	5
Barbados	2	1	0	1	22	14	+8	4
Saint Vincent and the Grenadines	2	0	1	1	5	17	–12	3

13 November 2011

Barbados	12–0	Saint Vincent

Garrison Historic Area

13 November 2011

Guadeloupe	5–5	Saint Vincent

Garrison Historic Area

13 November 2011

Barbados	10–14	Guadeloupe

Garrison Historic Area
