= 2022 Rugby Europe Women's Sevens Championship Series =

- Hosts: Portugal; Poland
- Date: 25 June – 3 July
- Nations: 10

Final positions
- Champions: Poland
- Runners-up: Ireland
- Third: Scotland

Team changes
- Promoted: Italy, Portugal, Sweden

The 2022 Rugby Europe Women's Sevens Championship Series will be the 2022 edition of Rugby Europe's annual rugby sevens season. Ten participating nations will compete in two legs, in Lisbon, Portugal, and Kraków, Poland. There was a separate 2022 Rugby World Cup Sevens European Qualifier event held in Bucharest in July.

Russia and Ukraine were both scheduled to participate, however, following the Russian invasion of Ukraine, the World Rugby Executive Council barred the Rugby Union of Russia and Ukraine withdrew. Both France and Ireland, who were due to be relegated to the 2022 Trophy tournament as a punishment for not fielding teams in the previous 2021 Championship competition, were awarded the places vacated by Russia and Ukraine.

== Schedule ==
Date	Venue	Winner	Runner-up	Third
25–26 June	(Portugal) Lisbon	Poland	Scotland	France
1–3 July	(Poland) Kraków	Ireland	Poland	Spain
Overall		Poland	Ireland	Scotland

== Teams ==
- Belgium
- Czech Republic
- France
- Germany
- Ireland
- Poland
- Romania
- Spain
- Scotland
- Wales

== Standings ==
2022 Rugby Europe Sevens Championship
Pos	Event Team	Lisbon	Kraków	Points total
1	Poland	20	18	38
2	Ireland	14	20	34
3	Scotland	18	14	32
4	France	16	10	26
5	Spain	10	16	26
6	Belgium	8	12	20
7	Czech Republic	12	8	20
8	Germany	6	4	10
9	Romania	4	6	10
10	Wales	3	3	6

Legend
Green fill	Champions, entry to European Games and World Challenger Series
Blue fill	Entry to European Games and World Challenger Series
No fill	Entry to European Games
Dark bar	Already a core team for the 2022–23 World Rugby Women's Sevens Series
Yellow fill	Excluded from European Games

== First leg – Lisbon ==
=== Pool stage ===
==== Pool A ====
Team	Pld	W	D	L	PF	PA	PD	Pts
Poland	4	4	0	0	140	55	+85	12
France	4	3	0	1	166	47	+119	10
Czech Republic	4	2	0	2	46	103	-57	8
Belgium	4	1	0	3	62	87	-15	6
Wales	4	0	0	4	34	161	-127	4

==== Pool B ====
Team	Pld	W	D	L	PF	PA	PD	Pts
Scotland	4	3	1	0	97	31	+66	11
Ireland	4	3	0	1	124	33	+91	10
Spain	4	2	1	1	113	47	+66	9
Germany	4	1	0	3	27	102	-75	6
Romania	4	0	0	4	5	153	-148	4

=== Ranking Games ===
==== Final ====
26 June
14:10 WEST (UTC+1)

Poland	19-15; Report	Scotland

Estádio Nacional

==== 3rd-place play-off ====
26 June
13:40 WEST (UTC+1)

France	33-7; Report	Ireland

Estádio Nacional

==== 5th-place play-off ====
26 June
14:25 WEST (UTC+1)

Czech Republic	14-12; Report	Spain

Estádio Nacional

==== 7th-place play-off ====
26 June
14:00 WEST (UTC+1)

Belgium	24-0; Report	Germany

Estádio Nacional

==== 9th-place play-off ====
26 June
13:40 WEST (UTC+1)

Wales	7-21; Report	Romania

Estádio Nacional

Results

== Second leg – Kraków ==
=== Pool stage ===
==== Pool A ====
Team	Pld	W	D	L	PF	PA	PD	Pts
Ireland	4	4	0	0			+111	12
Poland	4	3	0	1			+105	10
Czech Republic	4	2	0	2			-40	8
Romania	4	1	0	3			-91	6
Germany	4	0	0	4			-85	4

==== Pool B ====
Team	Pld	W	D	L	PF	PA	PD	Pts
Scotland	4	4	0	0			+94	12
Spain	4	3	0	1			+43	10
France	4	1	1	2			-8	7
Belgium	4	1	1	2			-13	7
Wales	4	0	0	4			-116	4

=== Knockout stage ===
==== 9th-10th playoff ====
9th place final
3 July
Germany	33
Wales	14

==== 5th–8th playoffs ====
5th place semi finals
3 July
Czech Republic	10
Belgium	14
3 July
Romania	7
France	36

5th place final
3 July
Belgium	26
France	14
7th place final
3 July
Czech Republic	45
Romania	0

==== 1st-4th playoffs ====
Semi finals
3 July
Ireland	26
Spain	0
3 July
Poland	14
Scotland	0

Final
3 July
Ireland	21
Poland	17
Third
3 July
Spain	21
Scotland	14

Results
