= 2013 NACRA Women's Sevens =

- Hosts: Cayman Islands
- Date: 9–10 November

Final positions
- Champions: Maple Leafs
- Runners-up: Mexico
- Third: Trinidad and Tobago

The 2013 NACRA Women's Sevens was the ninth tournament of the North America and Caribbean Women's Sevens Championship, the official rugby sevens continental championships organized by NACRA. Both the women's and men's competitions were held at the George Town which was in the Cayman Islands. It was held on 9–10 November. The stadium was the Truman Bodden Stadium as it was also a qualification tournament for the Central America and Caribbean Games which would be held in Mexico.

== General ==
The teams competed in two groups on the first day of the competition in a round-robin format. After the group stage, the teams advanced to the playoff stage beginning with the quarter-finals.

On the first day there were no surprises, the favored team which was the Canadian reserves then easily advanced to the finals, in which they defeated the Mexicans.

Three teams, besides Mexico, fulfilling the conditions imposed by the ODECABE earned promotion to the Central America and Caribbean Games.

== Group stage ==
=== Pool A ===
Nation	P	W	D	L	PF	PA	PD	Pts
Maple Leafs	3	3	0	0	135	0	+135	9
Mexico	3	2	0	1	75	66	+9	7
Cayman Islands	3	1	0	2	29	73	–44	5
Turks and Caicos Islands	3	0	0	3	0	97	–97	3

9 November 2013

Cayman Islands	0–38	Maple Leafs

9 November 2013

Mexico	37–0	Turks and Caicos Islands

9 November 2013

Maple Leafs	43–0	Turks and Caicos Islands

9 November 2013

Cayman Islands	12–35	Mexico

9 November 2013

Cayman Islands	17–0	Turks and Caicos Islands

9 November 2013

Maple Leafs	54–0	Mexico

=== Pool B ===
Nation	P	W	D	L	PF	PA	PD	Pts
Trinidad and Tobago	3	3	0	0	69	17	+52	9
Bermuda	3	2	0	1	40	27	+13	7
Jamaica	3	1	0	2	24	31	–7	5
Curaçao	3	0	0	3	10	78	–68	3

9 November 2013

Trinidad and Tobago	17–12	Bermuda

9 November 2013

Jamaica	19–0	Curaçao

9 November 2013

Trinidad and Tobago	45–0	Curaçao

9 November 2013

Bermuda	14–0	Jamaica

9 November 2013

Bermuda	14–10	Curaçao

9 November 2013

Trinidad and Tobago	17–5	Jamaica

== Knockout Phase ==
=== Cup ===
Quarter-finals
10 November 2013
Maple Leafs	49
Curaçao	0
10 November 2013
Cayman Islands	26
Bermuda	5
10 November 2013
Mexico	24
Jamaica	0
10 November 2013
Turks and Caicos	0
Trinidad and Tobago	49

Semi-finals
10 November 2013
Maple Leafs	38
Cayman Islands	0
10 November 2013
Mexico	17
Trinidad and Tobago	7

Final
10 November 2013
Maple Leafs	51
Mexico	0
Third place
10 November 2013
Cayman Islands	5
Trinidad and Tobago	14

=== Plate ===
Semi-finals
10 November 2013
Jamaica	43
Curaçao	0
10 November 2013
Bermuda	19
Turks and Caicos	12

Plate Final
10 November 2013
Jamaica	22
Bermuda	0
7th Place
10 November 2013
Curaçao	17
Turks and Caicos	12
