= 2022 RAN Women's Sevens Qualifiers =

North American rugby tournament

- Hosts: Bahamas
- Date: April 23–24, 2022
- Nations: 5

Final positions
- Champions: Canada
- Runners-up: Mexico
- Third: Jamaica; Trinidad and Tobago

Series details
- Matches played: 12

The 2022 RAN Women's Sevens Qualifiers are a North American rugby sevens tournament that took place at the Thomas Robinson Stadium, Nassau on April 23 and 24, 2022; they were held in The Bahamas for the third time. Owing to the postponement of the 2022 RAN Women's Super Sevens (originally scheduled to be held in Mexico City during February 2022), this event was created specifically to maintain a qualification pathway to the 2022 Rugby World Cup Sevens, with one place awarded to the winner only.

Five teams participated in the tournament, including 2019 champions Mexico.

== Format ==
All five teams contest a ten-match round-robin over two days, with each team playing four matches. Upon conclusion of the round-robin, the top two teams from the pool advance to the final, while the third/fourth-ranked teams progress to the third-place match.

== Teams ==
The following five national teams participated:

- Canada
- Cayman Islands
- Jamaica
- Mexico
- Trinidad and Tobago

== Pool stage ==
All times in Eastern Daylight Time (UTC−04:00)

Legend
Advanced to final
Advanced to third-place match

| Team | Pld | W | D | L | PF | PA | PD | Pts |
|---|---|---|---|---|---|---|---|---|
| Canada | 4 | 4 | 0 | 0 | 226 | 0 | +226 | 12 |
| Mexico | 4 | 3 | 0 | 1 | 108 | 55 | +53 | 10 |
| Jamaica | 4 | 2 | 0 | 2 | 63 | 119 | -56 | 8 |
| Trinidad and Tobago | 4 | 1 | 0 | 3 | 32 | 93 | -61 | 6 |
| Cayman Islands | 4 | 0 | 0 | 4 | 10 | 172 | -162 | 4 |

| April 23, 2022 | Canada | 44–0 | Trinidad and Tobago | Thomas Robinson Stadium |
| 10:50 |

| April 23, 2022 | Mexico | 48–5 | Cayman Islands | Thomas Robinson Stadium |
| 11:12 |

| April 23, 2022 | Jamaica | 27–10 | Trinidad and Tobago | Thomas Robinson Stadium |
| 13:50 |

| April 23, 2022 | Canada | 45–0 | Mexico | Thomas Robinson Stadium |
| 14:12 |

| April 23, 2022 | Canada | 66–0 | Jamaica | Thomas Robinson Stadium |
| 16:50 |

| April 23, 2022 | Cayman Islands | 0–22 | Trinidad and Tobago | Thomas Robinson Stadium |
| 17:12 |

| April 24, 2022 | Jamaica | 31–5 | Cayman Islands | Thomas Robinson Stadium |
| 9:44 |

| April 24, 2022 | Mexico | 22–0 | Trinidad and Tobago | Thomas Robinson Stadium |
| 10:06 |

| April 24, 2022 | Canada | 71–0 | Cayman Islands | Thomas Robinson Stadium |
| 11:56 |

| April 24, 2022 | Mexico | 38–5 | Jamaica | Thomas Robinson Stadium |
| 12:18 |

== Placement stage ==
Third place

| April 24, 2022 | Jamaica | 17–17 | Trinidad and Tobago | Thomas Robinson Stadium |
| 14:30 |

Final

| April 24, 2022 | Canada | 33–0 | Mexico | Thomas Robinson Stadium |
| 17:48 |

== Final standings ==
Legend
Qualified for the 2022 Rugby World Cup Sevens

| Pos | Team |
|---|---|
| 1 | Canada |
| 2 | Mexico |
| 3 | Jamaica |
| 3 | Trinidad and Tobago |
| 5 | Cayman Islands |

== See also ==
- 2021–22 World Rugby Women's Sevens Series

Rugby Americas North Women's Sevens
| Preceded by 2019 George Town | 2022 RAN Women's Sevens Qualifiers | Succeeded by 2022 Mexico City |
