= 2012 NACRA Women's Sevens =

- Hosts: Canada
- Date: 25–26 August 2012
- Nations: 5

Final positions
- Champions: Canada
- Runners-up: Trinidad and Tobago

The 2012 NACRA Women's Sevens was a regional qualifying tournament for the 2013 Rugby World Cup Sevens and was held on 25 and 26 August 2012 at the Twin Elm Rugby Park in Ottawa. There were five teams that competed for the single qualifying spot, the United States did not compete as they had already qualified by reaching the semifinals of the 2009 Rugby World Cup Sevens in Dubai. The tournament was played as a round-robin with a playoff among the top four finishing teams. Canada qualified for the Sevens World Cup after defeating Trinidad and Tobago in the final.

== Tournament ==
=== Pool stage ===
| Team | Pld | W | D | L | PF | PA | +/– | Pts |
|---|---|---|---|---|---|---|---|---|
| Canada | 4 | 4 | 0 | 0 | 196 | 0 | +196 | 12 |
| Jamaica | 4 | 3 | 0 | 1 | 60 | 52 | +8 | 10 |
| Trinidad and Tobago | 4 | 2 | 0 | 2 | 68 | 70 | –2 | 8 |
| Mexico | 4 | 1 | 0 | 3 | 46 | 111 | –65 | 6 |
| Cayman Islands | 4 | 0 | 0 | 4 | 0 | 137 | –137 | 4 |

25 August 2012

| Canada | 62–0 | Mexico |

Twin Elm Rugby Park

25 August 2012

| Jamaica | 17–0 | Cayman Islands |

Twin Elm Rugby Park

25 August 2012

| Canada | 50–0 | Cayman Islands |

Twin Elm Rugby Park

25 August 2012

| Jamaica | 19–7 | Trinidad and Tobago |

Twin Elm Rugby Park

25 August 2012

| Canada | 45–0 | Jamaica |

Twin Elm Rugby Park

25 August 2012

| Trinidad and Tobago | 25–12 | Mexico |

Twin Elm Rugby Park

25 August 2012

| Canada | 39–0 | Trinidad and Tobago |

Twin Elm Rugby Park

25 August 2012

| Mexico | 35–0 | Cayman Islands |

Twin Elm Rugby Park

25 August 2012

| Jamaica | 24–0 | Mexico |

Twin Elm Rugby Park

25 August 2012

| Trinidad and Tobago | 36–0 | Cayman Islands |

Twin Elm Rugby Park

=== Knockout round ===
Semi-finals
26 August 2012
Canada | 42
Mexico | 0
26 August 2012
Jamaica | 5
Trinidad and Tobago | 22

Final
26 August 2012
Canada | 46
Trinidad and Tobago | 0
