= 2014 NACRA Women's Sevens =

Rugby sevens tournament

- Hosts: Mexico
- Date: 3–4 December

Final positions
- Champions: Mexico
- Runners-up: Trinidad and Tobago
- Third: Cayman Islands

The 2014 NACRA Women's Sevens was the tenth tournament of the North America and Caribbean Women's Sevens Championship, the official rugby sevens continental championships organized by NACRA. Both the women's and men's competitions were held at the Campo Marte in Mexico City, Mexico on 3–4 December 2014.

Eight national teams competed in the women's tournament. Mexico as the winner qualified to compete at the 2015 Pan American Games in Toronto, Canada.

== Pool stage ==
Qualified for the medal round

=== Pool A ===
Team	Pld	W	D	L	Points
Mexico	3	3	0	0	9
Bermuda	3	2	0	1	6
Jamaica	3	1	0	2	3
Bahamas	3	0	0	3	0

December 3, 2014

Mexico	33 – 0	Bermuda

December 3, 2014

Jamaica	24 – 0	Bahamas

December 3, 2014

Mexico	43 – 0	Bahamas

December 3, 2014

Jamaica	5 – 17	Bermuda

December 3, 2014

Mexico	35 – 0	Jamaica

December 3, 2014

Bermuda	34 – 0	Bahamas

=== Pool B ===
Team	Pld	W	D	L	Points
Trinidad and Tobago	3	3	0	0	9
Cayman Islands	3	2	0	1	6
Saint Lucia	3	1	0	2	3
Turks and Caicos Islands	3	0	0	3	0

December 3, 2014

Cayman Islands	31 – 7	Saint Lucia

December 3, 2014

Trinidad and Tobago	29 – 0	Turks and Caicos Islands

December 3, 2014

Trinidad and Tobago	25 – 5	Saint Lucia

December 3, 2014

Cayman Islands	38 – 0	Turks and Caicos Islands

December 3, 2014

Saint Lucia	27 – 0	Turks and Caicos Islands

December 3, 2014

Trinidad and Tobago	19 – 14	Cayman Islands

== Elimination stage ==
Quarter-finals
December 4 — Mexico City
Trinidad and Tobago	19
Bahamas	5
December 4 — Mexico City
Cayman Islands	15
Jamaica	12
December 4 — Mexico City
Mexico	43
Turks and Caicos Islands	0
December 4 — Mexico City
Bermuda	12
Saint Lucia	5

Semi-finals
December 4 — Mexico City
Trinidad and Tobago	20
Cayman Islands	5
December 4 — Mexico City
Mexico	31
Bermuda	0

Final
December 4 — Mexico City
Trinidad and Tobago	5
Mexico	40
Third place
December 4 — Mexico City
Cayman Islands	17
Bermuda	14

=== Quarterfinals ===
December 4, 2014

Trinidad and Tobago	19 – 5	Bahamas

December 4, 2014

Mexico	43 – 0	Turks and Caicos Islands

December 4, 2014

Cayman Islands	15 – 12	Jamaica

December 4, 2014

Bermuda	12 – 5	Saint Lucia

=== Plate ===
December 4, 2014

Bahamas	10 – 31	Jamaica

December 4, 2014

Turks and Caicos Islands	7 – 10	Saint Lucia

=== Seventh place match ===
December 4, 2014

Turks and Caicos Islands	0 – 22	Bahamas

=== Fifth place match ===
December 4, 2014

Saint Lucia	5 – 12	Jamaica

=== Semifinals ===
December 4, 2014

Trinidad and Tobago	20 – 5	Cayman Islands

December 4, 2014

Mexico	31 – 0	Bermuda

=== Bronze medal match ===
December 4, 2014

Cayman Islands	17 – 14	Bermuda

=== Gold medal match ===
December 4, 2014

Trinidad and Tobago	5 – 40	Mexico

== Final standings ==
Qualified for the 2015 Pan American Games

Rank	Team
Gold medal	Mexico
Silver medal	Trinidad and Tobago
Bronze medal	Cayman Islands
4	Bermuda
5	Jamaica
6	Saint Lucia
7	Bahamas
8	Turks and Caicos Islands
