= 2009 NACRA Women's Sevens =

- Hosts: Mexico
- Date: 14–15 November 2009
- Nations: 5

Final positions
- Champions: Guyana
- Runners-up: Saint Lucia
- Third: Mexico

Series details
- Matches played: 19 / 20

The 2009 NACRA Women's Sevens is the tournament's fifth edition and took place on 14 and 15 November 2009 at the Roberto Mendez Stadium in Mexico City, Mexico. Five teams competed in a round-robin tournament with Guyana winning the two day event.

== Tournament ==
=== Standings ===
| Nation | P | W | D | L | PF | PA | PD | Pts |
|---|---|---|---|---|---|---|---|---|
| Guyana | 8 | 8 | 0 | 0 | 250 | 15 | +223 | 24 |
| Saint Lucia | 7 | 4 | 1 | 2 | 90 | 58 | +32 | 16 |
| Mexico | 8 | 3 | 1 | 4 | 102 | 136 | –33 | 15 |
| Cayman Islands | 8 | 2 | 0 | 6 | 56 | 122 | –78 | 12 |
| Bahamas | 7 | 1 | 0 | 6 | 41 | 194 | –144 | 9 |

=== Matches ===
==== Day 1 ====
14 November 2009

| Mexico | 12–5 | Cayman Islands |

Roberto Mendez Stadium

14 November 2009

| Guyana | 17–10 | Saint Lucia |

Roberto Mendez Stadium

14 November 2009

| Guyana | 24–0 | Cayman Islands |

Roberto Mendez Stadium

14 November 2009

| Saint Lucia | 22–0 | Bahamas |

Roberto Mendez Stadium

14 November 2009

| Mexico | 5–12 | Saint Lucia |

Roberto Mendez Stadium

14 November 2009

| Guyana | 45–0 | Bahamas |

Roberto Mendez Stadium

14 November 2009

| Mexico | 12–17 | Bahamas |

Roberto Mendez Stadium

14 November 2009

| Saint Lucia | 15–0 | Cayman Islands |

Roberto Mendez Stadium

14 November 2009

| Cayman Islands | 22–12 | Bahamas |

Roberto Mendez Stadium

14 November 2009

| Mexico | 5–33 | Guyana |

Roberto Mendez Stadium

==== Day 2 ====
15 November 2009

| Mexico | 12–12 | Saint Lucia |

Roberto Mendez Stadium

15 November 2009

| Guyana | 47–0 | Bahamas |

Roberto Mendez Stadium

15 November 2009

| Mexico | 0–27 | Guyana |

Roberto Mendez Stadium

15 November 2009

| Cayman Islands | 10–5 | Bahamas |

Roberto Mendez Stadium

15 November 2009

| Mexico | 27–7 | Bahamas |

Roberto Mendez Stadium

15 November 2009

| Saint Lucia | 19–5 | Cayman Islands |

Roberto Mendez Stadium

15 November 2009

| Saint Lucia | Cancelled | Bahamas |

Roberto Mendez Stadium

15 November 2009

| Guyana | 26–0 | Cayman Islands |

Roberto Mendez Stadium

15 November 2009

| Mexico | 19–12 | Cayman Islands |

Roberto Mendez Stadium

15 November 2009

| Guyana | 19–0 | Saint Lucia |

Roberto Mendez Stadium
