= Vanuatu women's national rugby sevens team =

Rugby team

Vanuatu
- Union: Vanuatu Rugby Football Union

First international
- Fiji 48–0 Vanuatu (7 November 2019, ANZ Stadium, Suva)

Largest win
- Nauru 10–24 Vanuatu (8 November 2019, ANZ Stadium)

World Cup Sevens
- Appearances: 0

The Vanuatu women's national rugby sevens team is Vanuatu's national representative in rugby sevens.

== History ==
Vanuatu made their international debut at the 2019 Oceania Women's Sevens Championship against hosts, Fiji. They placed tenth overall out of twelve competing teams. They had their first taste of international sevens when they played New Caledonia ahead of the Pacific Games in Samoa earlier that year.

They competed at the 2022 Oceania Rugby Sevens Challenge tournament in Brisbane in an attempt to qualify for the World Rugby Sevens Challenger Series in 2023.

== Tournament History ==
=== Oceania Women's Sevens ===
Oceania Women's Sevens
Year	Round	Position	Pld	W	D	L
2007–2018	Did Not Compete					
(Fiji) 2019	Ninth Place Playoff	10th	5	1	0	4
(Australia) 2021	Did Not Compete					
(New Zealand) 2022	Did Not Compete					
(Australia) 2023	Did Not Compete					
Total	0 Titles	1/13	5	1	0	4

=== Oceania Rugby Sevens Challenge ===
Year	Round	Position	Pld	W	D	L
(Australia) 2022	Fifth Place Playoff	6th	0	0	0	7
Total	0 Titles	1/1	0	0	0	7
