= 2015 NACRA Women's Sevens =

- Hosts: United States
- Date: 13–14 June
- Nations: United States; Bahamas; Barbados; Cayman Islands; Guyana; Jamaica; Mexico; Trinidad and Tobago

Final positions
- Champions: United States
- Runners-up: Mexico
- Third: Trinidad and Tobago

The 2015 NACRA Women's Sevens Championships was an Olympic qualification tournament for Rugby sevens at the 2016 Summer Olympics held at WakeMed Soccer Park in Cary, North Carolina, USA on 13–14 June 2015. It was the 11th championship in a series that began in 2005. The tournament used a round-robin format, with the top team qualifying directly to the Olympics, and the second and third place teams qualifying for the Olympic Qualification Tournament.

== Pools ==
Pool A
- Barbados
- Cayman Islands
- Jamaica
- United States

Pool B
- Bahamas
- Guyana
- Mexico
- Trinidad and Tobago

== Pool Stage ==
The ranking of each team in each group were determined as follows:

1. higher win percentage in all group matches;
2. points obtained in all group matches;
3. most wins (including Overtime Wins) in all group matches;
4. highest points difference in all group matches;
5. lowest points against in all group matches;

=== Pool A ===
Teams	Pld	W	D	L	PF	PA	+/−	Pts
United States	3	3	0	0	169	0	+169	9
Jamaica	3	2	0	1	66	50	+16	6
Cayman Islands	3	1	0	2	12	81	–69	3
Barbados	3	0	0	3	10	126	–116	0

13 June 2015
11:44

United States	45–0	Jamaica

WakeMed Soccer Park, Cary

13 June 2015
11:44

Cayman Islands	12–5	Barbados

WakeMed Soccer Park, Cary

13 June 2015
14:06

United States	74–0	Barbados

WakeMed Soccer Park, Cary

13 June 2015
14:06

Cayman Islands	0–26	Jamaica

WakeMed Soccer Park, Cary

13 June 2015
16:28

United States	50–0	Cayman Islands

WakeMed Soccer Park, Cary

13 June 2015
16:28

Jamaica	40–5	Barbados

WakeMed Soccer Park, Cary

=== Pool B ===
Teams	Pld	W	D	L	PF	PA	+/−	Pts
Mexico	3	3	0	0	87	14	+73	9
Trinidad and Tobago	3	2	0	1	71	41	+30	6
Guyana	3	1	0	2	40	73	–33	3
Bahamas	3	0	0	3	12	82	–70	0

13 June 2015
12:06

Mexico	31–0	Bahamas

WakeMed Soccer Park, Cary

13 June 2015
12:06

Trinidad and Tobago	34–12	Guyana

WakeMed Soccer Park, Cary

13 June 2015
14:28

Trinidad and Tobago	30–0	Bahamas

WakeMed Soccer Park, Cary

13 June 2015
14:28

Mexico	27–7	Guyana

WakeMed Soccer Park, Cary

13 June 2015
16:50

Mexico	29–7	Trinidad and Tobago

WakeMed Soccer Park, Cary

13 June 2015
16:50

Bahamas	12–21	Guyana

WakeMed Soccer Park, Cary

== Placement Stage ==
=== Quarterfinals ===
Quarter-finals
14 June 2015 - 9:44 - WakeMed Soccer Park, Cary
United States	59
Bahamas	0
14 June 2015 - 9:44 - WakeMed Soccer Park, Cary
Jamaica	24
Guyana	0
14 June 2015 - 10:06 - WakeMed Soccer Park, Cary
Trinidad and Tobago	27
Cayman Islands	7
14 June 2015 - 10:06 - WakeMed Soccer Park, Cary
Mexico	33
Barbados	0

Semi-finals
14 June 2015 - 12:29 - WakeMed Soccer Park, Cary
United States	53
Jamaica	5
14 June 2015 - 12:29 - WakeMed Soccer Park, Cary
Trinidad and Tobago	0
Mexico	15

Final
14 June 2015 - 17:04 - WakeMed Soccer Park, Cary
United States	88
Mexico	0
Third place
14 June 2015 - 16:20 - WakeMed Soccer Park, Cary
Jamaica	10
Trinidad and Tobago	12

=== Fifth–Eighth Place ===
Semi-finals
14 June 2015 - 12:51 - WakeMed Soccer Park, Cary
Bahamas	0
Guyana	25
14 June 2015 - 12:51 - WakeMed Soccer Park, Cary
Cayman Islands	12
Barbados	10

Final
14 June 2015 - 15:36 - WakeMed Soccer Park, Cary
Guyana	5
Cayman Islands	12
Third place
14 June 2015 - 14:52 - WakeMed Soccer Park, Cary
Bahamas	10
Barbados	5

== Final standings ==
Legend
Qualified for the 2016 Summer Olympics.
Qualified for the Final 2016 Women's Olympic Qualification Tournament.

Rank	Team
1st place, gold medalist(s)	United States
2nd place, silver medalist(s)	Mexico
3rd place, bronze medalist(s)	Trinidad and Tobago
4	Jamaica
5	Cayman Islands
6	Guyana
7	Bahamas
8	Barbados

== See also ==
- 2015 NACRA Sevens (men)
