= 2010 NACRA Women's Sevens =

- Hosts: Guyana
- Date: 26–27 July 2010
- Nations: 6

Final positions
- Champions: Guyana
- Runners-up: Trinidad and Tobago
- Third: Jamaica

Series details
- Matches played: 20

The 2010 NACRA Women's Sevens was the sixth edition of the competition and took place on 26 and 27 July 2010, at the Providence Stadium at Georgetown, Guyana. Six teams competed in the tournament with hosts, Guyana, winning the event after beating Trinidad and Tobago in the Cup final.

== Pool Stage ==
=== Standings ===
Nation	P	W	D	L	PF	PA	PD	Pts	
Guyana	5	4	1	0	114	0	+114	14	Qualified for Cup Semi-finals
Jamaica	5	3	2	0	75	17	+58	13	Qualified for Cup Semi-finals
Trinidad and Tobago	5	3	1	1	106	24	+82	12	Qualified for Cup Semi-finals
Saint Lucia	5	2	0	3	22	52	–30	9	Qualified for Cup Semi-finals
Mexico	5	1	0	4	29	113	–84	7	Qualified for 5th-place final
Cayman Islands	5	0	0	5	7	147	–140	5	Qualified for 5th-place final

=== Matches ===
26 July 2010

Cayman Islands	7–10	Mexico

Providence Stadium

26 July 2010

Trinidad and Tobago	5–5	Jamaica

Providence Stadium

26 July 2010

Guyana	46–0	Mexico

Providence Stadium

26 July 2010

Cayman Islands	0–36	Jamaica

Providence Stadium

26 July 2010

Trinidad and Tobago	27–0	Saint Lucia

Providence Stadium

26 July 2010

Guyana	0–0	Jamaica

Providence Stadium

26 July 2010

Cayman Islands	0–12	Saint Lucia

Providence Stadium

26 July 2010

Trinidad and Tobago	31–7	Mexico

Providence Stadium

26 July 2010

Guyana	10–0	Saint Lucia

Providence Stadium

27 July 2010

Guyana	46–0	Cayman Islands

Providence Stadium

27 July 2010

Saint Lucia	10–0	Mexico

Providence Stadium

27 July 2010

Cayman Islands	0–43	Trinidad and Tobago

Providence Stadium

27 July 2010

Mexico	12–19	Jamaica

Providence Stadium

27 July 2010

Guyana	12–0	Trinidad and Tobago

Providence Stadium

27 July 2010

Saint Lucia	0–15	Jamaica

Providence Stadium

== Classification Stage ==
=== Cup Semi-finals ===
Semi-finals
27 July 2010
Jamaica	7
Trinidad and Tobago	12
27 July 2010
Guyana	21
Saint Lucia	0

Cup Final
27 July 2010
Guyana	14
Trinidad and Tobago	12
3rd Place
27 July 2010
Jamaica	22
Saint Lucia	0

=== 5th-Place final ===
5th Place
27 July 2010
Mexico	26
Cayman Islands	5
