= Vanuatu national under-20 rugby union team =

Vanuatu Under 20
- Union: Vanuatu Rugby Football Union
Team kit

The Vanuatu national under-20 rugby union team is Vanuatu's junior team that plays rugby union football at international level. The team competes at the Oceania Rugby Junior Trophy competition as of 2015.

== See also ==
- Rugby union in Vanuatu
