= 2019 Asia Rugby Women's Sevens Olympic Qualifying Tournament =

- Hosts: CHN
- Date: 9–10 November
- Nations: 8

Final positions
- Champions: China
- Runners-up: Hong Kong
- Third: Kazakhstan

Series details
- Matches played: 20

The 2019 Asia Rugby Women's Sevens Olympic Qualifying Tournament was held on 9–10 November at Guangzhou Higher Education Mega Center Central Stadium in Guangzhou. Japan, as host, prequalified for the Olympic Games, and did not take part in this competition. The champion of the tournament, hosts China, qualify for the Asian continental berth in the 2020 Summer Olympics. The second and third-placed teams, Hong Kong and Kazakhstan, qualify to take part in a 2020 Olympic repechage tournament for one of two final berths in Tokyo.

== Teams ==
- China
- Hong Kong
- Kazakhstan
- South Korea
- Philippines
- Singapore
- Sri Lanka
- Thailand

== Pool stage ==
All times in China Standard Time (UTC+08:00)

Key to colours in group tables
Teams that advanced to the Cup Semifinal

=== Pool A ===
Team	Pld	W	D	L	PF	PA	PD	Pts
China	3	3	0	0	146	7	+139	9
Hong Kong	3	2	0	1	81	49	+32	7
Sri Lanka	3	1	0	2	26	87	–61	5
South Korea	3	0	0	3	5	115	–110	3

9 November 2019
14:44

Hong Kong	27–7	Sri Lanka

Guangzhou Higher Education Mega Center Central Stadium

9 November 2019
15:06

China	49–0	South Korea

Guangzhou Higher Education Mega Center Central Stadium

9 November 2019
17:38

Sri Lanka	19–5	South Korea

Guangzhou Higher Education Mega Center Central Stadium

9 November 2019
18:00

China	42–7	Hong Kong

Guangzhou Higher Education Mega Center Central Stadium

10 November 2019
9:44

Hong Kong	47–0	South Korea

Guangzhou Higher Education Mega Center Central Stadium

10 November 2019
10:06

China	55–0	Sri Lanka

Guangzhou Higher Education Mega Center Central Stadium

=== Pool B ===
Team	Pld	W	D	L	PF	PA	PD	Pts
Kazakhstan	3	3	0	0	97	17	+80	9
Thailand	3	2	0	1	81	17	+64	7
Singapore	3	1	0	2	20	98	–78	5
Philippines	3	0	0	3	24	90	–66	3

9 November 2019
14:00

Thailand	33–0	Singapore

Guangzhou Higher Education Mega Center Central Stadium

9 November 2019
14:22

Kazakhstan	34–5	Philippines

Guangzhou Higher Education Mega Center Central Stadium

9 November 2019
16:54

Singapore	20–19	Philippines

Guangzhou Higher Education Mega Center Central Stadium

9 November 2019
17:16

Kazakhstan	17–12	Thailand

Guangzhou Higher Education Mega Center Central Stadium

10 November 2019
9:00

Thailand	36–0	Philippines

Guangzhou Higher Education Mega Center Central Stadium

10 November 2019
9:22

Kazakhstan	46–0	Singapore

Guangzhou Higher Education Mega Center Central Stadium

== Knockout round ==
=== Plate ===
Semi-finals
10 November – 12:30 – Guangzhou
Singapore	19
South Korea	7
10 November – 12:52 – Guangzhou
Sri Lanka	12
Philippines	10

Plate final
10 November – 15:42 – Guangzhou
Singapore	12
Sri Lanka	33
Seventh place
10 November – 15:20 – Guangzhou
South Korea	5
Philippines	31

=== Cup ===
Semi-finals
10 November – 13:14 – Guangzhou
Kazakhstan	7
Hong Kong	19
10 November – 13:36 – Guangzhou
China	34
Thailand	0

Final
10 November – 16:30 – Guangzhou
Hong Kong	0
China	33
Third place
10 November – 16:04 – Guangzhou
Kazakhstan	17
Thailand	14
