= Rugby union in Vanuatu =

- Country: Vanuatu
- Governing body: Vanuatu Rugby Football Union
- National team: Vanuatu
- Registered players: 2,143
- Clubs: 15

Rugby union in Vanuatu, formerly known as the New Hebrides, is a popular sport. Vanuatu is a tier three rugby union playing nation. They began playing international rugby union in 1966 and have yet to make the Rugby World Cup.

Despite its size and lack of club infrastructure, there are 2143 registered players of rugby union, 100 of whom are female, and there are fifteen clubs. Although some may argue about the true 'number of players' involved in the game, no one can deny the slow progress the game has had in a nation where politics and sport go hand in hand.

The national side is ranked 91st in the world (as of June, 2009) and has played just 8 matches.

== Governing body ==
The governing body is the Vanuatu Rugby Football Union based at Port Vila. However, political influences has seen the national body crumble under allegations of corruption by the governing body and those who head it. This led to matches being postponed until recently when outside parties had to intervene.

== History ==
Rugby union reached Vanuatu via both the French and the British, as well as contacts with neighbouring islands. Before independence in 1980, the New Hebrides were a unique form of colonial territory in which sovereignty was shared by two great powers - Britain and France - instead of exercised by just one. The Condominium divided the New Hebrides into two separate communities — one Anglophone and one Francophone. This divide continues even after independence, with schools either teaching in one language or the other, and between different political parties.

Teams from Vanuatu have competed with teams from the Solomon Islands although usually with not much success.

In the 1980s and 1990s an expatriate team in Port Vila, the Berocca's, regularly played local teams within Port Vila and hosted visiting Australian and New Zealand Navy teams. These games fostered the growth of local rugby and the talent within the local teams.

== See also ==
- Vanuatu national rugby union team
- Vanuatu national under-20 rugby union team
- Vanuatu Rugby Football Union
