= 2023 World Rugby Sevens Challenger Series – Women's tour =

Rugby sevens competition

2023 World Rugby Sevens Challenger Series
- Women's tour – Series II
- Hosts: South Africa
- Date: 20–30 April 2023
- Nations: 12

Final positions
- Champions: South Africa
- Runners-up: Belgium
- Third: China

The 2023 Challenger Series for women's rugby sevens teams was the second season of the second-tier circuit that allowed a promotion pathway to the World Rugby Sevens Series.

The women's challenger tour had twelve national teams competing and was played as two tournaments on 20–22 and 28–30 April 2023 in Stellenbosch, South Africa, with the winner gaining direct entry to the 2023–24 World Rugby Sevens series.

== Teams ==
There were 12 women's national teams competing in the Challenger Series for 2023.

Date qualified	Means of qualification	Nation
30 April 2022	2022 Africa Women's Sevens	South Africa
30 April 2022	2022 Africa Women's Sevens	Madagascar
11 June 2022	2022 Sudamérica Rugby Women's Sevens	Colombia
3 July 2022	2022 Rugby Europe Women's Sevens Series	Poland
3 July 2022	2022 Rugby Europe Women's Sevens Series	Belgium
3 July 2022	2022 Rugby Europe Women's Sevens Series	Czech Republic
9 October 2022	2022 South American Games (Note: When the Challenger Series schedule was announced in December 2022, the second qualifying team from South America had not been determined. It was not until a month later that Paraguay's place was confirmed, based on their second-place finish at the South American Games back in October 2022.)	Paraguay
14 November 2022	2022 RAN Women's Super Sevens	Mexico
20 November 2022	2022 Oceania Women's Sevens Challenge	Papua New Guinea
27 November 2022	2022 Asia Rugby Women's Sevens Series	China
27 November 2022	2022 Asia Rugby Women's Sevens Series	Thailand
27 November 2022	2022 Asia Rugby Women's Sevens Series	Hong Kong
Totals	7	12

== Schedule ==
The official schedule for the 2023 World Rugby Sevens Challenger Series was:

2023 Itinerary
Leg	Stadium	City	Dates	Winner
1	Markotter Stadium	Stellenbosch	20–22 April 2023	South Africa
2	Markotter Stadium	Stellenbosch	28–30 April 2023	South Africa

== Standings ==
2023 World Rugby Sevens Challenger Series – Women's Series II
Pos	Event Team	Leg 1	Leg 2	Total points
1	South Africa	20	20	40
2	Belgium	18	18	36
3	China	16	16	32
4	Poland	14	12	26
5	Czech Republic	12	14	26
6	Thailand	10	4	14
7	Hong Kong	4	10	14
8	Colombia	6	8	14
9	Madagascar	8	3	11
10	Paraguay	1	6	7
11	Mexico	3	1	4
12	Papua New Guinea	2	2	4

== Pool stage – Leg 1 ==
All times are in SAST, South African Standard Time: (UTC+2).

=== Pool D ===
Pos	Team	Pld	W	D	L	PF	PA	PD	Pts	Qualification
1	Poland	3	3	0	0	72	26	+46	9	Advance to quarter-finals
2	Colombia	3	2	0	1	66	50	+16	7	Advance to quarter-finals
3	Hong Kong	3	1	0	2	29	58	−29	5	
4	Paraguay	3	0	0	3	31	64	−33	3	

Source: World Rugby

20 April
11:22

Colombia	15–12	Hong Kong
Try: Laura Mejia; Valentina Tapias; Leidy García	Report	Try: Maggie Au Yeung; Rosanna Wright; Con: Rosanna Wright

Markotter Stadium
Referee: Doriane Domenjo

20 April
11:44

Poland	15–7	Paraguay
Try: Katarzyna Paszczyk; Małgorzata Kołdej; Ilona Zaishliuk	Report	Try: Cecilia Benza; Con: Lucero Viveros

Markotter Stadium
Referee: Giana Viljoen

20 April
14:19

Colombia	32–12	Paraguay
Try: Camila Lopera (2); Leidy Soto (2); Valentina Tapias; Madi Cordoba; Con: Camila Lopera	Report	Try: Sofia Armoa; Maira Mendez; Con: Lucero Viveros

Markotter Stadium
Referee: Precious Pazani

20 April
14:46

Poland	31–0	Hong Kong
Try: Małgorzata Kołdej (3); Tamara Czumer-Iwin; Ilona Zaishliuk; Con: Natalia Pamięta (2); Julia Druzgała	Report

Markotter Stadium
Referee: Ano Kuwai

21 April
09:22

Hong Kong	17–12	Paraguay
Try: Natasha OLSON-THORNE; Jess HO Wai-on; Micayla Baltazar; Con: Rosanna Wright	Report	Try: Cinthia Cristaldo Santander; Maria Gauto; Con: Lucero Viveros

Markotter Stadium
Referee: Doriane Domenjo

21 April
11:32

Poland	26–19	Colombia
Try: Anna Klichowska (2); Ilona Zaishliuk (2); Con: Natalia Pamięta (2); Julia Druzgała	Report	Try: Camila Lopera; Karina Michelle Bagui Prado (2); Con: Camila Lopera; Laura Mejia

Markotter Stadium
Referee: Jess Ling

=== Pool E ===
Pos	Team	Pld	W	D	L	PF	PA	PD	Pts	Qualification
1	South Africa	3	2	1	0	57	12	+45	8	Advance to quarter-finals
2	Czech Republic	3	1	1	1	24	21	+3	6	Advance to quarter-finals
3	Madagascar	3	1	0	2	38	33	+5	5	Advance to quarter-finals
4	Mexico	3	1	0	2	14	67	−53	5	

Source: World Rugby

20 April
09:00

Madagascar	26–7	Mexico
Try: Claudia Rasoarimalala; Ericka Razakaniaina; Ginah Raharimalala; Jinah Kelly Razanamahefa; Con: Patricia Ravololonirina (2); Zoanah Fanantenana	Report	Try: Daniela Alvarado; Con: Alessandra Bender

Markotter Stadium
Referee: Giana Viljoen

20 April
09:22

South Africa	7–7	Czech Republic
Try: Simamkele Namba; Con: Eloise Webb	Report	Try: Anežka-Marta Sládková; Con: Julie Doležilová

Markotter Stadium
Referee: Doriane Domenjo

20 April
12:16

Madagascar	7–12	Czech Republic
Try: Jinah Kelly Razanamahefa; Con: Jinah Kelly Razanamahefa	Report	Try: Anežka-Marta Sládková (2); Con: Julie Doležilová

Markotter Stadium
Referee: Zoe Naude

20 April
12:38

South Africa	36–0	Mexico
Try: Mathrin Simmers (2); Nadine Roos; Eloise Webb; Ayanda Malinga; Simamkele Namba; Con: Eloise Webb (3)	Report

Markotter Stadium
Referee: Jess Ling

21 April
09:00

Mexico	7–5	Czech Republic
	Report

Markotter Stadium
Referee: Ano Kuwai

21 April
11:10

South Africa	14–5	Madagascar
Try: Zintle Mpupha; Marlize de Bruin; Con: Nadine Roos (2)	Report	Try: Ericka Razakaniaina

Markotter Stadium
Referee: Precious Pazani

=== Pool F ===
Pos	Team	Pld	W	D	L	PF	PA	PD	Pts	Qualification
1	China	3	3	0	0	91	0	+91	9	Advance to quarter-finals
2	Belgium	3	2	0	1	46	45	+1	7	Advance to quarter-finals
3	Thailand	3	1	0	2	48	38	+10	5	Advance to quarter-finals
4	Papua New Guinea	3	0	0	3	19	121	−102	3	

Source: World Rugby

20 April
09:00

Belgium	27–12	Papua New Guinea
Try: Cecile Blondiau (2); Emilie Musch (2); Noemie van de Poele; Con: Ella Amory	Report	Try: Fatima Rama; Alice Alois; Con: Kymlie Rapilla

Markotter Stadium
Referee: Jess Ling

20 April
09:22

China	12–0	Thailand
Try: Chen Keyi (2); Con: Chen Keyi	Report

Markotter Stadium
Referee: Zoe Naude

20 April
12:16

Belgium	19–0	Thailand
Try: Cecile Blondiau (2); Emilie Musch; Con: Nele Pien; Heloise Stevins	Report

Markotter Stadium
Referee: Ano Kuwai

20 April
12:38

China	46–0	Papua New Guinea
Try: Chen Keyi (2); Yan Meiling; Liu Xiaoqian (2); Wang Xiao; Gao Yueying; Liao Jiuli; Con: Gu Yaoyao (2) Liao Jiuli	Report

Markotter Stadium
Referee: Precious Pazani

21 April
09:00

Papua New Guinea	7–48	Thailand
Try: Fatima Rama; Con: Lynette Aua	Report	Try: Uthumporn Liamrat; Laksina Nawakaew; Jeeraporn Peerabunanon (2); Rattanaporn Wittayaronnayut (2); Nantadchaporn Yodya Jutartip Yimyaem; Con: Panpassa Jaijarim Thanaporn Huankid (3)

Markotter Stadium
Referee: Zoe Naude

21 April
09:22

China	33–0	Belgium
Try: Chen Keyi; Gu Yaoyao; Liu Xiaoqian (2); Zhou Yan; Con: Chen Keyi (2); Gu Yaoyao (2)	Report

Markotter Stadium
Referee: Giana Viljoen

=== Ranking of third-placed teams ===
Pos	Team	Pld	W	D	L	PF	PA	PD	Pts	Qualification
1	Madagascar	3	1	0	2	38	33	+5	5	Advance to quarter-finals
2	Thailand	3	1	0	2	48	45	+3	5	Advance to quarter-finals
3	Hong Kong	3	1	0	2	29	58	−29	5	

Source: World Rugby

== Knockout stage – Leg 1 ==
=== Cup bracket ===
Quarter-finals
21 April – Markotter Stadium
South Africa	29
Thailand	12
21 April – Markotter Stadium
China	32
Colombia	0
21 April – Markotter Stadium
Czech Republic	17
Belgium	26
21 April – Markotter Stadium
Poland	19
Madagascar	5

Semi-finals
22 April – Markotter Stadium
South Africa	5
China	0
22 April – Markotter Stadium
Belgium	24
Poland	19

Final
22 April – Markotter Stadium
South Africa	17
Belgium	10
Third place
22 April – Markotter Stadium
China	14
Poland	10

Cup quarter-finals

21 April
17:50

South Africa	29–12	Thailand
Try: Zintle Mpupha; Ayanda Malinga (3); Marlize de Bruin; Con: Nadine Roos; Eloise Webb	Report	Try: Nantadchaporn Yodya (2); Con: Passorn Jaengjob

Markotter Stadium
Referee: Jess Ling

21 April
18:15

China	32-0	Colombia
Try: Chen Keyi; Liu Xiaoqian (3); Hu Yu; Zhou Yan; Con: Chen Keyi	Report

Markotter Stadium
Referee: Precious Pazani

21 April
20:02

Czech Republic	17–26	Belgium
Try: Julie Doležilová; Anežka-Marta Sládková; Tereza Baťhová; Con: Petra Vacková	Report	Try: Margaux Lalli; Cecile Blondiau (2); Manon Nairac; Con: Ella Amory (3)

Markotter Stadium
Referee: Doriane Domenjo

21 April
20:30

Poland	19–5	Madagascar
Try: Hanna Maliszewska; Ilona Zaishliuk (2); Con: Natalia Pamięta; Julia Druzgała	Report	Try: Claudia Rasoarimalala

Markotter Stadium
Referee: Giana Viljoen

Cup semi-finals

22 April
09:54

South Africa	5–0	China
Try: Simamkele Namba	Report

Markotter Stadium
Referee: Ano Kuwai

22 April
10:16

Belgium	24–19	Poland
Try: Margaux Lalli (2); Cecile Blondiau; Emilie Musch; Con: Nele Pien (2)	Report	Try: Małgorzata Kołdej (2); Ilona Zaishliuk; Con: Natalia Pamięta (2)

Markotter Stadium
Referee: Jess Ling

Third-place final

22 April
11:46

China	14–10	Poland
Try: Yan Meiling; Liu Xiaoqian; Con: Gu Yaoyao (2)	Report	Try: Małgorzata Kołdej; Julia Druzgała

Markotter Stadium
Referee: Doriane Domenjo

Cup final

22 April
12:33

South Africa	17–10	Belgium
Try: Nadine Roos; Ayanda Malinga; Marlize de Bruin; Con: Libbie Janse van Rensburg	Report	Try: Nele Pien; Emilie Musch

Markotter Stadium
Referee: Jess Ling

=== 5th–8th bracket ===
5th-place semi-finals
22 April – Markotter Stadium
Thailand	19
Colombia	5
22 April – Markotter Stadium
Czech Republic	10
Madagascar	5

5th-place final
22 April – Markotter Stadium
Thailand	10
Czech Republic	34
7th-place final
22 April – Markotter Stadium
Colombia	12
Madagascar	14

5th-place semi-finals

22 April
08:00

Thailand	19–5	Colombia
Try: Uthumporn Liamrat (2); Panpassa Jaijarim; Con: Panpassa Jaijarim; Passorn Jaengjob	Report	Try: Leidy García

Markotter Stadium
Referee: Giana Viljoen

22 April
08:00

Czech Republic	10–5	Madagascar
Try: Julie Doležilová; Kristýna Plevová; Con: Precious Pazani	Report	Try: Monica Rasoloniaina

Markotter Stadium

5th-place final

22 April
11:52

Thailand	10–34	Czech Republic
Try: Laksina Nawakaew; Narathip Maneesai	Report	Try: Kristýna Riegertová (3); Anežka-Marta Sládková (2); Veronika Oupicová; Con: Julie Doležilová; Pavlina Cuprova

Markotter Stadium
Referee: Zoe Naude

7th-place final

22 April
11:52

Colombia	12–14	Madagascar
Try: Daniela Alzate; Leidy García; Con: Laura Mejia	Report	Try: Joelà Mirasoa Fenohasina; Monica Rasoloniaina; Con: Ericka Razakaniaina; Jinah Kelly Razanamahefa

Markotter Stadium
Referee: Precious Pazani

=== 9th–12th bracket ===
9th-place semi-finals
21 April – Markotter Stadium
Hong Kong	44
Papua New Guinea	7
21 April – Markotter Stadium
Mexico	19
Paraguay	5

9th-place final
22 April – Markotter Stadium
Hong Kong	15
Mexico	12
11th-place final
22 April – Markotter Stadium
Papua New Guinea	10
Paraguay	5

9th-place semi-finals

22 April
10:44

Hong Kong	44–7	Papua New Guinea
Try: Natasha Olson-Thorne (3); Nam Ka Man; Rosanna Wright (2); Gabriella Rivers (2); Con: Rosanna Wright (2)	Report	Try: Fatima Rama; Con: Sharon Kobor

Markotter Stadium
Referee: Ano Kuwai

22 April
11:06

Mexico	19–5	Paraguay
Try: Zoe Tuyú; Maria Pruijn (2); Con: Alessandra Bender (2)	Report	Try: Sofia Armoa

Markotter Stadium
Referee: Zoe Naude

11th-place final

22 April
9:54

Papua New Guinea	10–5	Paraguay
Try: Kymlie Rapilla; Alice Alois	Report	Try: Cinthia Cristaldo Santander

Markotter Stadium
Referee: Doriane Domenjo

9th-place final

22 April
10:16

Hong Kong	15–12	Mexico
Try: Natasha Olson-Thorne (2); Georgia Rivers	Report	Try: Laura Rodríguez; Alessandra Bender; Con: Alessandra Bender

Markotter Stadium
Referee: Zoe Naude

=== Placings – Leg 1 ===
Leg 1 Summary
Position	Team	Pld	W	L	D
1st	South Africa	6	5	0	1
2nd	Belgium	6	4	2	0
3rd	China	6	5	1	0
4th	Poland	6	4	2	0
5th	Czech Republic	6	3	2	1
6th	Thailand	6	2	4	0
7th	Madagascar	6	2	4	0
8th	Colombia	6	2	4	0
9th	Hong Kong	5	3	2	0
10th	Mexico	5	2	3	0
11th	Papua New Guinea	5	1	4	0
12th	Paraguay	5	0	5	0

== Pool stage – Leg 2 ==
=== Pool D ===
Pos	Team	Pld	W	D	L	PF	PA	PD	Pts	Qualification
1	South Africa	3	3	0	0	86	5	+81	9	Advance to quarter-finals
2	Paraguay	3	1	0	2	33	53	−20	5	Advance to quarter-finals
3	Madagascar	3	1	0	2	24	45	−21	5	
4	Thailand	3	1	0	2	31	71	−40	5	

Source: World Rugby

28 April
11:22

Thailand	19–7	Madagascar
	Report

Markotter Stadium
Referee: Ano Kuwai

28 April
11:44

South Africa	29–0	Paraguay
	Report

Markotter Stadium
Referee: Precious Pazani

28 April
14:19

Thailand	12–26	Paraguay
	Report

Markotter Stadium
Referee: Doriane Domenjo

28 April
14:46

South Africa	19–5	Madagascar
	Report

Markotter Stadium
Referee: Jess Ling

29 April
9:22

Madagascar	12–7	Paraguay
	Report

Markotter Stadium
Referee: Doriane Domenjo

29 April
11:32

South Africa	38–0	Thailand
	Report

Markotter Stadium
Referee: Ano Kuwai

=== Pool E ===
Pos	Team	Pld	W	D	L	PF	PA	PD	Pts	Qualification
1	Belgium	3	3	0	0	74	10	+64	9	Advance to quarter-finals
2	Czech Republic	3	2	0	1	44	46	−2	7	Advance to quarter-finals
3	Colombia	3	1	0	2	41	43	−2	5	Advance to quarter-finals
4	Papua New Guinea	3	0	0	3	17	77	−60	3	

Source: World Rugby

28 April
09:00

Czech Republic	24–17	Colombia
	Report

Markotter Stadium
Referee: Ano Kuwai

28 April
09:22

Belgium	43–0	Papua New Guinea
	Report

Markotter Stadium
Referee: Giana Viljoen

28 April
12:16

Czech Republic	15–10	Papua New Guinea
	Report

Markotter Stadium
Referee: Zoe Naude

28 April
12:38

Belgium	12–5	Colombia
	Report

Markotter Stadium
Referee: Doriane Domenjo

29 April
09:00

Colombia	19–7	Papua New Guinea
	Report

Markotter Stadium
Referee: Jess Ling

29 April
11:10

Belgium	19–5	Czech Republic
	Report

Markotter Stadium
Referee: Zoe Naude

=== Pool F ===
Pos	Team	Pld	W	D	L	PF	PA	PD	Pts	Qualification
1	China	3	3	0	0	96	14	+82	9	Advance to quarter-finals
2	Poland	3	1	1	1	63	48	+15	6	Advance to quarter-finals
3	Hong Kong	3	1	1	1	36	53	−17	6	Advance to quarter-finals
4	Mexico	3	0	0	3	21	101	−80	3	

Source: World Rugby

28 April
9:00

Poland	17–17	Hong Kong
	Report

Markotter Stadium
Referee: Precious Pazani

28 April
9:22

China	43–7	Mexico
	Report

Markotter Stadium
Referee: Zoe Naude

28 April
12:16

Poland	39–7	Mexico
	Report

Markotter Stadium
Referee: Jess Ling

28 April
12:38

China	29–0	Hong Kong
	Report

Markotter Stadium
Referee: Giana Viljoen

29 April
9:00

Hong Kong	19–7	Mexico
	Report

Markotter Stadium
Referee: Precious Pazani

29 April
10:38

China	24–7	Poland
	Report

Markotter Stadium
Referee: Giana Viljoen

=== Ranking of third-placed teams ===
Pos	Team	Pld	W	D	L	PF	PA	PD	Pts	Qualification
1	Hong Kong	3	1	1	1	36	53	−17	6	Advance to quarter-finals
2	Colombia	3	1	0	2	41	43	−2	5	Advance to quarter-finals
3	Madagascar	3	1	0	2	24	45	−21	5	

Source: World Rugby

== Knockout stage – Leg 2 ==
=== Cup bracket ===
Quarter-finals
29 April – Markotter Stadium
Belgium	40
Hong Kong	5
29 April – Markotter Stadium
China	39
Paraguay	0
29 April – Markotter Stadium
Czech Republic	17
Poland	5
29 April – Markotter Stadium
South Africa	31
Colombia	0

Semi-finals
30 April – Markotter Stadium
Belgium	22
China	5
30 April – Markotter Stadium
Czech Republic	0
South Africa	24

Final
30 April – Markotter Stadium
Belgium	14
South Africa	17
Third place
30 April – Markotter Stadium
China	31
Czech Republic	15

=== 5th–8th bracket ===
5th-place semi-finals
29 April – Markotter Stadium
Hong Kong	12
Paraguay	5
29 April – Markotter Stadium
Poland	14
Colombia	12

5th-place final
30 April – Markotter Stadium
Hong Kong	10
Poland	24
7th-place final
30 April – Markotter Stadium
Paraguay	0
Colombia	24

=== 9th–12th bracket ===
9th-place semi-finals
29 April – Markotter Stadium
Madagascar	24
Mexico	0
29 April – Markotter Stadium
Thailand	34
Papua New Guinea	0

9th-place final
30 April – Markotter Stadium
Madagascar	14
Thailand	22
11th-place final
30 April – Markotter Stadium
Mexico	10
Papua New Guinea	24

=== Placings – Leg 2 ===
Leg 2 Summary
Position	Team	Pld	W	L	D
1st	South Africa	6	6	0	0
2nd	Belgium	6	5	1	0
3rd	China	6	4	2	0
4th	Czech Republic	6	3	3	0
5th	Poland	6	3	2	1
6th	Hong Kong	6	2	3	1
7th	Colombia	6	2	4	0
8th	Paraguay	6	1	5	0
9th	Thailand	5	1	4	0
10th	Madagascar	5	2	3	0
11th	Papua New Guinea	5	1	4	0
12th	Mexico	5	1	4	0

== See also ==
- 2023 World Rugby Sevens Challenger Series – Men's tour
