= 2020 Women's Rugby Sevens Final Olympic Qualification Tournament =

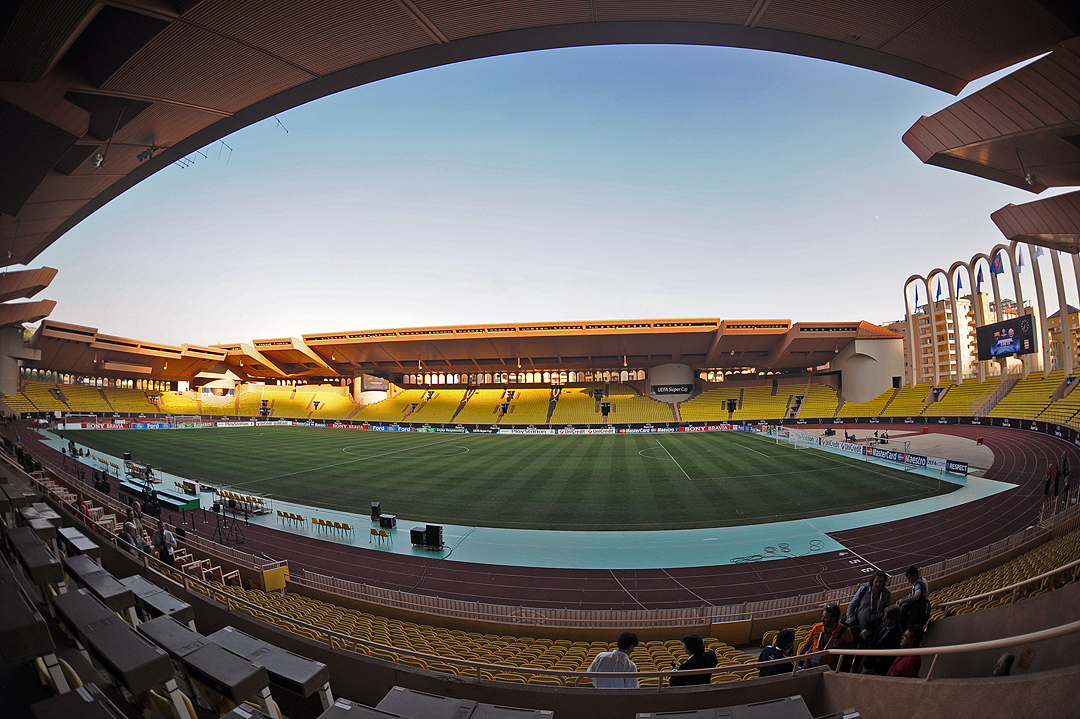
- The tournament venue, Stade Louis II.
- Hosts: Monaco
- Date: 19–20 June 2021
- Nations: 11
- Qualification winners: France and Russia

The final qualification repechage tournament for women's rugby sevens at the 2020 Summer Olympics was held on 19–20 June 2021 at Stade Louis II in Monaco. The tournament was originally scheduled for a year earlier, but was postponed until 2021 due to the global COVID-19 pandemic.

Twelve women's teams were eligible to compete in the repechage tournament, as high placing teams from the six continental Olympic qualification events. Jamaica was a late withdrawal from the tournament due to travel difficulties presented by the global COVID-19 pandemic, which reduced the number of teams competing to eleven.

France and Russia were the two best teams in the repechage, each going through the tournament undefeated. They claimed the two qualifying berths on offer for the women's sevens tournament at the Tokyo Olympics.

== Teams ==
Event	Dates	Location	Quota	Qualifier
2019 South American Qualifying Tournament	1–2 June 2019	(Peru) Lima	2	Colombia Argentina
2019 RAN Women's Sevens	6–7 July 2019	(Cayman Islands) George Town	2	Mexico ~~Jamaica~~ (Note: Jamaica was a late withdrawal from the tournament due to travel difficulties presented by the global COVID-19 pandemic.)
2019 European Qualifying Tournament	13–14 July 2019	(Russia) Kazan	2	Russia France
2019 Africa Women's Sevens	12–13 October 2019	(Tunisia) Jemmal	2	Madagascar Tunisia
2019 Oceania Women's Sevens Championship	7–9 November 2019	(Fiji) Suva	2	Papua New Guinea Samoa
2019 Asian Qualifying Tournament	9–10 November 2019	(China) Guangzhou	2	Hong Kong Kazakhstan
Total				11 teams

- Notes:

== Pool stage ==
The teams were drawn into three pools with each team playing against all opponents in their own pool. Due to the late withdrawal of Jamaica, all matches involving them were recorded as a bye for their opponents in Pool B.

=== Pool A ===
Team	Pld	W	D	L	PF	PA	PD	Pts
Russia (Q)	3	3	0	0	128	7	+121	9
Argentina (Q)	3	2	0	1	58	53	+5	7
Samoa (Q)	3	1	0	2	32	64	−32	5
Mexico	3	0	0	3	17	111	−94	3

(Q) Qualified for the phase indicated

19 June
10:58

Argentina	36–0	Mexico
	Report

Stade Louis II, Monaco

19 June
11:20

Russia	32–0	Samoa
	Report

Stade Louis II, Monaco

19 June
16:16

Argentina	15–12	Samoa
	Report

Stade Louis II, Monaco

19 June
17:00

Russia	55–0	Mexico
	Report

Stade Louis II, Monaco

20 June
10:41

Mexico	17-20	Samoa
	Report

Stade Louis II, Monaco

20 June
11:03

Russia	41–7	Argentina
	Report

Stade Louis II, Monaco

=== Pool B ===
Team	Pld	W	D	L	PF	PA	PD	Pts
Kazakhstan (Q)	2	2	0	0	29	10	+19	6
Tunisia (Q)	2	1	0	1	46	17	+29	4
Papua New Guinea	2	0	0	2	15	63	−48	2

(Q) Qualified for the phase indicated

19 June
14:08

Papua New Guinea	5–46	Tunisia
	Report

Stade Louis II, Monaco

19 June
17:00

Kazakhstan	12–0	Tunisia
	Report

Stade Louis II, Monaco

20 June
11:47

Papua New Guinea	10–17	Kazakhstan
	Report

Stade Louis II, Monaco

=== Pool C ===
Team	Pld	W	D	L	PF	PA	PD	Pts
France (Q)	3	3	0	0	151	0	+151	9
Hong Kong (Q)	3	2	0	1	50	77	−27	7
Colombia (Q)	3	1	0	2	22	85	−63	5
Madagascar	3	0	0	3	19	80	−61	3

(Q) Qualified for the phase indicated

19 June
14:30

Hong Kong	31–10	Colombia
	Report

Stade Louis II, Monaco

19 June
14:52

France	49–0	Madagascar
	Report

Stade Louis II, Monaco

19 June
19:31

Hong Kong	19–12	Madagascar
	Report

Stade Louis II, Monaco

19 June
19:53

France	47–0	Colombia
	Report

Stade Louis II, Monaco

20 June
12:09

Colombia	12–7	Madagascar
	Report

Stade Louis II, Monaco

20 June
12:31

France	55–0	Hong Kong
	Report

Stade Louis II, Monaco

== Combined standings ==
The top two teams from each pool, plus the two best third-placed teams on the combined pool standings progressed to the knockout stage. The seedings were based on (a) highest pool placing, then (b) most competition points awarded (for a win, draw or loss) in the respective pool standings, and (c) greatest difference between points scored and conceded across all pool matches played.

#	Team	Place	Pld	−/+	Pts
1	France	1st C	3	+151	9
2	Russia	1st A	3	+121	9
3	Kazakhstan	1st B	2	+19	6
4	Argentina	2nd A	3	+5	7
5	Hong Kong	2nd C	3	–27	7
6	Tunisia	2nd B	2	+29	4
7	Samoa	3rd A	3	–32	5
8	Colombia	3rd C	3	–63	5
9	Papua New Guinea	3rd B	2	–48	2
10	Madagascar	4th C	3	–61	3
11	Mexico	4th A	3	–94	3

Key
Qualifier semi-finalists
1st placed in pool
2nd placed in pool
Two best 3rd placed

== Knockout stage ==
With two Olympic places available, the top eight women's teams from the pool stage were seeded into two separate four-team brackets. The winners of each bracket qualified for the women's sevens tournament at the Tokyo Olympics.

Qualifier semi-finals
3	Kazakhstan	29
6	Tunisia	21
2	Russia	29
7	Samoa	0

Qualifier final 1
3	Kazakhstan	0
2	Russia	38

Qualifier semi-finals
4	Argentina	5
5	Hong Kong	24
1	France	52
8	Colombia	0

Qualifier final 2
5	Hong Kong	0
1	France	51

=== Qualifier semi-finals ===
20 June
14:55

Argentina	5–24	Hong Kong
	Report

Stade Louis II, Monaco

20 June
15:17

Kazakhstan	29–21	Tunisia
	Report

Stade Louis II, Monaco

20 June
15:39

Russia	29–0	Samoa
	Report

Stade Louis II, Monaco

20 June
16:01

France	52–0	Colombia
	Report

Stade Louis II, Monaco

=== Qualifier finals ===
20 June
18:07

Kazakhstan	0–38	Russia
	Report

Stade Louis II, Monaco

20 June
18:37

Hong Kong	0–51	France
	Report

Stade Louis II, Monaco

== Placings ==
Legend
Qualified to 2020 Summer Olympics

Rank	Team
1	France
1	Russia
3	Kazakhstan
3	Hong Kong
5	Argentina
5	Tunisia
5	Samoa
5	Colombia
9	Papua New Guinea
9	Madagascar
9	Mexico

== See also ==
- 2020 Men's Rugby Sevens Final Olympic Qualification Tournament
