= 2013 FIRA-AER Women's Sevens – Division A =

International women's rugby level

- Host nation: Czech Republic
- Date: June 7–8 2013

Cup
- Champion: Sweden
- Runner-up: Belgium
- Third: Czech Republic

Plate
- Winner: Switzerland
- Runner-up: Moldova

Bowl
- Winner: Georgia
- Runner-up: Denmark

The 2013 FIRA-AER Women's Sevens – Division A was the second level of international women's rugby sevens competitions organised by FIRA-AER for 2013. The competition featured just one tournament, played in Prague. Sweden won the tournament and, along with runner-ups Belgium, were promoted to the 2014 Grand Prix series.

== Pool stages ==
=== Group A ===
Nation	Won	Drawn	Lost	For	Against
Sweden	4	0	1	84	19
Poland	4	0	0	79	36
Croatia	3	0	2	79	36
Romania	2	0	3	19	68
Georgia	2	0	2	62	82
Australia	0	0	5	5	142

- Romania 0-14 Poland
- Croatia 12-5 Georgia
- Sweden 29-0 Austria
- Georgia 7-15 Poland
- Romania 12-0 Austria
- Sweden 10-0 Croatia
- Austria 5-36 Poland
- Sweden 0-19 Georgia
- Croatia 28-7 Romania
- Georgia 31-0 Austria
- Croatia 5-14 Poland
- Sweden 26-0 Romania
- Croatia 34-0 Austria
- Romania 55-0 Georgia
- Sweden 19-0 Poland

=== Group B ===
Nation	Won	Drawn	Lost	For	Against
Belgium	5	0	0	166	26
Czech Republic	3	1	1	118	43
Moldova	3	1	1	97	47
Switzerland	2	0	3	64	100
Denmark	1	0	4	42	132
Hungary	0	0	5	19	164

- Belgium 33-5 Denmark
- Moldova 45-0 Hungary
- Switzerland 5-29 Czech Republic
- Hungary 14-24 Denmark
- Belgium 24-12 Czech Republic
- Switzerland 7-19 Moldova
- Czech Republic 35-7 Denmark
- Switzerland 21-5 Hungary
- Moldova 0-28 Belgium
- Hungary 0-33 Czech Republic
- Moldova 26-5 Denmark
- Switzerland 7-40 Belgium
- Moldova 7-7 Czech Republic
- Belgium 41-0 Hungary
- Switzerland 24-7 Denmark

== Knockout stage ==
=== Bowl ===
Semi-finals

- Georgia 31-0 Hungary
- Austria 7-22 Denmark

11th Place

- Hungary 0-27 Austria

Final

- Georgia 28-0 Denmark

=== Plate ===
Semi-finals

- Croatia 5-10 Switzerland
- Romania 12-17 Moldova

7th Place

- Croatia 5-19 Romania

Final

- Switzerland 5-15 Moldova

=== Cup ===
Semi-finals

- Sweden 14-10 Czech Republic
- Poland 0-36 Belgium

3rd Place

- Czech Republic 15-0 Poland

Final

- Sweden 0-24 Belgium
