= 2005 NAWIRA Women's Sevens =

- Hosts: Barbados
- Date: 19–20 November 2005
- Nations: 7

Final positions
- Champions: United States
- Runners-up: Trinidad and Tobago
- Third: Jamaica

The 2005 NAWIRA Women's Sevens was the inaugural tournament of the NAWIRA Women's Sevens and was held on 19 and 20 November 2005 in Barbados. The competition was played as a round-robin with seven teams competing, the United States went undefeated to win the tournament. There was also an exhibition match played between USA and a combined West Indies team.

== Tournament ==
=== Standings ===
Nation	P	W	D	L	PF	PA	PD	Pts
United States	6	6	0	0	250	5	+245	18
Trinidad and Tobago	6	5	0	1	127	56	+71	16
Jamaica	6	4	0	2	119	59	+60	14
Guyana	6	3	0	3	61	70	–9	12
Saint Vincent and the Grenadines	6	2	0	4	62	105	–43	10
Saint Lucia	6	1	0	5	22	129	–107	8
Barbados	6	0	0	6	10	227	–217	6

=== Matches ===
19 November 2005

Guyana	12–10	Saint Vincent

19 November 2005

Saint Lucia	15–5	Barbados

19 November 2005

Jamaica	17–0	Saint Vincent

19 November 2005

United States	36–0	Trinidad and Tobago

19 November 2005

Guyana	29–0	Barbados

19 November 2005

Saint Vincent	10–7	Saint Lucia

19 November 2005

Jamaica	10–0	Guyana

19 November 2005

Trinidad and Tobago	46–0	Barbados

19 November 2005

United States	46–0	Saint Lucia

19 November 2005

Trinidad and Tobago	19–10	Jamaica

19 November 2005

United States	38–0	Guyana

19 November 2005

Jamaica	29–0	Saint Lucia

20 November 2005

Saint Vincent	37–5	Barbados

20 November 2005

Trinidad and Tobago	12–5	Guyana

20 November 2005

United States	38–0	Saint Vincent

20 November 2005

Jamaica	48–0	Barbados

20 November 2005

Trinidad and Tobago	24–0	Saint Lucia

20 November 2005

United States	52–0	Barbados

20 November 2005

Guyana	15–0	Saint Lucia

20 November 2005

Trinidad and Tobago	26–5	Saint Vincent

20 November 2005

United States	40–5	Jamaica

=== Special Exhibition Match ===
20 November 2005

United States	29–0	West Indies
