= Vanuatu Rugby Football Union =

Sports governing body in Vanuatu

- Sport: Rugby union
- Founded: 1966; 60 years ago (est.)
- World Rugby affiliation: 1999
- Oceania Rugby affiliation: 2000
- Website: VRFU

The Vanuatu Rugby Football Union, or VRFU, is the governing body of the rugby union in Vanuatu. It was established in the 1960s, but only became fully affiliated with World Rugby, then the International Rugby Board, in 1999.

The Vanuatu Rugby Football Union is a full member of Oceania Rugby, which is the regional governing body of the rugby union in Oceania.

== National teams ==
Vanuatu's national team, the Tuskers, has not yet played in the World Cup but has competed at the South Pacific Games, including winning a bronze medal for rugby 15s (as New Hebrides) in 1966. Vanuatu fields teams in 7s competitions as well as 15s. The national women's 7s team was established in 2011.

In 2015, the country sent an Under 20 team to the yearly regional tournament, Oceania Rugby Junior Trophy, where the team would come against Pacific neighbors like Fiji, Tonga and PNG. The team went into the competition with some confidence after boasting some top local players and was led by their captain, who was based in New Zealand the team was hungry for success. Unfortunately, the team proved to be undersized compared to their much larger opposition, eventually finishing the tournament with 0 wins, 3 losses and recording only 1 score in the whole tournament. This disappointed the team, who were looking to play with a high-tempo game due to their smaller stature. The final results from the 3 round tournaments are as follows:

Round 1: Tonga 81 Vanuatu 0, Fiji 63 Papua New Guinea 0

Round 2: Tonga 55 Papua New Guinea 16, Fiji 109 Vanuatu 6

Round 3: Fiji 19 Tonga 10, Papua New Guinea 80 Vanuatu 7

== See also ==
- Vanuatu national rugby union team
- Vanuatu national rugby sevens team
- Vanuatu national under-20 rugby union team
- Vanuatu women's national rugby sevens team
- Rugby union in Vanuatu
