= 2007 NAWIRA Women's Sevens =

- Hosts: Bahamas
- Date: 17–18 November 2007
- Nations: 4

Final positions
- Champions: Canada
- Runners-up: USA Development Eagles
- Third: Jamaica

Series details
- Matches played: 12

The 2007 NAWIRA Women's Sevens was the third edition of the tournament and was held on 17 and 18 November 2007, at the Winton Rugby Centre in Nassau, Bahamas. Five teams were initially expected to compete, however, Trinidad and Tobago withdrew at the eleventh hour. The tournament was played as a round-robin with Canada claiming their first title.

== Tournament ==
=== Standings ===
Nation	P	W	D	L	PF	PA	PD	Pts
Canada	6	6	0	0	141	32	+109	18
USA Development Eagles	6	4	0	2	77	41	+36	14
Jamaica	6	2	0	4	22	67	–45	10
Guyana	6	0	0	6	15	115	–100	6

=== Matches ===
==== Day 1 ====
17 November 2007

USA Development Eagles	12–0	Jamaica

Winton Rugby Centre

17 November 2007

USA Development Eagles	7–5	Guyana

Winton Rugby Centre

17 November 2007

Canada	22–0	Jamaica

Winton Rugby Centre

17 November 2007

Guyana	10–24	Canada

Winton Rugby Centre

17 November 2007

Guyana	0–10	Jamaica

Winton Rugby Centre

17 November 2007

USA Development Eagles	7–17	Canada

Winton Rugby Centre

==== Day 2 ====
18 November 2007

Canada	21–0	Jamaica

Winton Rugby Centre

18 November 2007

USA Development Eagles	24–0	Guyana

Winton Rugby Centre

18 November 2007

USA Development Eagles	12–0	Jamaica

Winton Rugby Centre

18 November 2007

Guyana	0–38	Canada

Winton Rugby Centre

18 November 2007

USA Development Eagles	15–19	Canada

Winton Rugby Centre

18 November 2007

Guyana	0–12	Jamaica

Winton Rugby Centre
