= 2022 Rugby World Cup Sevens Women's European Qualifier =

Rugby world championship

- Hosts: Romania
- Date: 16 July – 17 July 2022
- Nations: 12

Series details
- Top try scorer: Amee-Leigh Murphy Crowe

The 2022 Rugby World Cup Sevens Women's European Qualifier was the final qualification event for the 2022 Rugby World Cup Sevens. 4 teams qualified from the 12 teams entered. The event was held at the Stadionul Arcul de Triumf in Bucharest.

== Teams ==
- Belgium
- Czech Republic
- England (Q)
- Germany
- Ireland (Q)
- Italy
- Poland (Q)
- Portugal
- Romania
- Spain (Q)
- Sweden
- Wales

Teams marked with (Q) qualified for 2022 Rugby World Cup Sevens.

== Event ==
All times are in Eastern European Summer Time.

=== Pool stage ===
==== Pool A ====
Team	Pld	W	D	L	PF	PA	PD	Pts
Ireland	3	3	0	0	141	0	+141	9
Czech Republic	3	2	0	1	64	71	−7	7
Germany	3	1	0	2	34	69	−35	5
Wales	3	0	0	3	21	120	−99	3

16 July 2022
11:28

Czech Republic	28 - 12	Germany
	Report

Stadionul Arcul de Triumf, Bucharest

16 July 2022
11:50

Ireland	62 - 0	Wales
	Report

Stadionul Arcul de Triumf, Bucharest

16 July 2022
18:28

Czech Republic	36 - 7	Wales
	Report

Stadionul Arcul de Triumf, Bucharest

16 July 2022
18:50

Ireland	27 - 0	Germany
	Report

Stadionul Arcul de Triumf, Bucharest

17 July 2022
11:28

Germany	22 - 14	Wales
	Report

Stadionul Arcul de Triumf, Bucharest

17 July 2022
11:50

Ireland	52 - 0	Czech Republic
	Report

Stadionul Arcul de Triumf, Bucharest

==== Pool B ====
Team	Pld	W	D	L	PF	PA	PD	Pts
England	3	3	0	0	98	10	+88	9
Belgium	3	2	0	1	63	46	+17	7
Romania	3	1	0	2	31	75	−44	5
Italy	3	0	0	3	29	90	−61	3

16 July 2022
10:44

Belgium	38 - 5	Italy
	Report

Stadionul Arcul de Triumf, Bucharest

16 July 2022
11:06

England	31 - 5	Romania
	Report

Stadionul Arcul de Triumf, Bucharest

16 July 2022
17:44

Belgium	25 - 5	Romania
	Report

Stadionul Arcul de Triumf, Bucharest

16 July 2022
18:06

England	31 - 5	Italy
	Report

Stadionul Arcul de Triumf, Bucharest

17 July 2022
10:44

Italy	19 - 21	Romania
	Report

Stadionul Arcul de Triumf, Bucharest

17 July 2022
11:06

England	36 - 0	Belgium
	Report

Stadionul Arcul de Triumf, Bucharest

==== Pool C ====
Team	Pld	W	D	L	PF	PA	PD	Pts
Poland	3	3	0	0	123	20	+103	9
Spain	3	2	0	1	86	41	+45	7
Portugal	3	1	0	2	48	88	−40	5
Sweden	3	0	0	3	10	118	−108	3

16 July 2022
10:00

Poland	40 - 5	Portugal
	Report

Stadionul Arcul de Triumf, Bucharest

16 July 2022
10:22

Spain	33 - 0	Sweden
	Report

Stadionul Arcul de Triumf, Bucharest

16 July 2022
17:00

Poland	52 - 0	Sweden
	Report

Stadionul Arcul de Triumf, Bucharest

16 July 2022
17:22

Spain	38 - 10	Portugal
	Report

Stadionul Arcul de Triumf, Bucharest

17 July 2022
10:00

Portugal	33 - 10	Sweden
	Report

Stadionul Arcul de Triumf, Bucharest

17 July 2022
10:22

Spain	15 - 31	Poland
	Report

Stadionul Arcul de Triumf, Bucharest

=== Qualification play-offs ===
Winners of the 4 matches advance to 2022 Rugby World Cup Sevens.

17 July 2022
17:00

Spain	14 - 12	Belgium
	Report

Stadionul Arcul de Triumf, Bucharest

17 July 2022
17:22

England	19 - 5	Czech Republic
	Report

Stadionul Arcul de Triumf, Bucharest

17 July 2022
17:44

Poland	43 - 0	Germany
	Report

Stadionul Arcul de Triumf, Bucharest

17 July 2022
18:06

Ireland	36 - 0	Portugal
	Report

Stadionul Arcul de Triumf, Bucharest
