= 2022 RAN Women's Super Sevens =

- Hosts: Mexico
- Date: November 12–13, 2022
- Nations: 6

Final positions
- Champions: Mexico
- Runners-up: Jamaica
- Third: Trinidad and Tobago

The 2022 Rugby Americas North Women's Super Sevens was a North American rugby sevens tournament that took place at the Estadio Alfredo Harp Helú, Mexico City on November 12–13, 2022.

Six teams participated in the tournament. Mexico defeated Jamaica 33–12 in the final and qualified for the 2023 World Rugby Sevens Challenger Series.

== Format ==
All six teams contest a twelve-match round-robin over two days, with each team playing five matches. Upon conclusion of the round-robin, the top two teams from the pool advance to the final, while the third/fourth-ranked teams progress to the third-place match.

== Teams ==
The following six national teams participated:

- Bermuda
- Dominican Republic
- Jamaica
- Mexico
- Saint Lucia
- Trinidad and Tobago

== Pool stage ==
All times in Central Time Zone (UTC−06:00)

Legend
Advanced to final
Advanced to third-place match
Advanced to fifth-place match

Team	Pld	W	D	L	PF	PA	PD	Pts
Mexico	5	5	0	0	164	17	+147	15
Jamaica	5	4	0	1	118	48	+70	13
Trinidad and Tobago	5	3	0	2	85	43	+42	11
Saint Lucia	5	2	0	3	73	74	-1	9
Dominican Republic	5	1	0	4	44	104	-60	7
Bermuda	5	0	0	0	5	203	-198	5

November 12	Mexico	31–5	Saint Lucia	Estadio Alfredo Harp Helú
10:50

November 12	Trinidad and Tobago	39–0	Bermuda	Estadio Alfredo Harp Helú
11:12

November 12	Jamaica	24–5	Dominican Republic	Estadio Alfredo Harp Helú
11:34

November 12	Saint Lucia	10–14	Trinidad and Tobago	Estadio Alfredo Harp Helú
13:46

November 12	Mexico	21–12	Jamaica	Estadio Alfredo Harp Helú
14:08

November 12	Bermuda	0–34	Dominican Republic	Estadio Alfredo Harp Helú
14:30

November 12	Mexico	19–0	Trinidad and Tobago	Estadio Alfredo Harp Helú
16:12

November 12	Bermuda	0–49	Jamaica	Estadio Alfredo Harp Helú
16:34

November 12	Dominican Republic	5–12	Saint Lucia	Estadio Alfredo Harp Helú
16:56

November 13	Bermuda	5–29	Saint Lucia	Estadio Alfredo Harp Helú
9:30

November 13	Trinidad and Tobago	5–14	Jamaica	Estadio Alfredo Harp Helú
9:52

November 13	Mexico	41–0	Dominican Republic	Estadio Alfredo Harp Helú
10:14

November 13	Saint Lucia	17–19	Jamaica	Estadio Alfredo Harp Helú
12:00

November 13	Trinidad and Tobago	27–0	Dominican Republic	Estadio Alfredo Harp Helú
12:22

November 13	Mexico	52–0	Bermuda	Estadio Alfredo Harp Helú
12:44

== Placement stage ==
=== Fifth place ===
November 13	Dominican Republic	24 –10	Bermuda	Estadio Alfredo Harp Helú
14:30

=== Third place ===
November 13	Trinidad and Tobago	20–0	Saint Lucia	Estadio Alfredo Harp Helú
14:52

=== Final ===
November 13	Mexico	33–12	Jamaica	Estadio Alfredo Harp Helú
16:20

== Final standings ==
Legend	
Green	Qualified for the 2023 World Rugby Sevens Challenger Series
Blue bar	Qualified for the 2023 Pan American Games

Pos	Team
1	Mexico
2	Jamaica
3	Trinidad and Tobago
4	Saint Lucia
5	Dominican Republic
6	Bermuda
