= 2008 NAWIRA Women's Sevens =

- Hosts: Bahamas
- Date: 9–10 November
- Nations: 8

Final positions
- Champions: Canada
- Runners-up: United States
- Third: Guyana

The 2008 NAWIRA Women's Sevens was a regional qualifying tournament for the inaugural 2009 Women's Rugby World Cup Sevens and was held from 24 to 26 October at the Winton Rugby Club in Nassau, Bahamas. Champions, Canada, and runner-up, the United States, qualified for the World Cup.

== Teams ==
Eight women's teams competed at the tournament.

- Barbados
- Bermuda
- Canada
- Cayman Islands
- Guyana
- Jamaica
- Trinidad and Tobago
- United States

== Pool Stage ==
=== Pool A ===
Teams	Pld	W	D	L	PF	PA	+/−	Pts
United States	3	3	0	0	142	0	+142	9
Trinidad and Tobago	3	2	0	1	41	52	–11	7
Guyana	3	1	0	2	41	57	–16	5
Bermuda	3	0	0	3	7	122	–115	3

24 October 2008

United States	45−0	Bermuda

24 October 2008

Guyana	0−5	Trinidad and Tobago

24 October 2008

Guyana	41−7	Bermuda

24 October 2008

United States	52−0	Trinidad and Tobago

24 October 2008

United States	45−0	Guyana

24 October 2008

Trinidad and Tobago	36−0	Bermuda

=== Pool B ===
Teams	Pld	W	D	L	PF	PA	+/−	Pts
Canada	3	3	0	0	139	0	+139	9
Jamaica	3	2	0	1	87	29	+58	7
Barbados	3	1	0	2	10	101	–91	5
Cayman Islands	3	0	0	3	5	111	–106	3

24 October 2008

Jamaica	39−0	Barbados

24 October 2008

Canada	53−0	Cayman Islands

24 October 2008

Jamaica	48−0	Cayman Islands

24 October 2008

Canada	57−0	Barbados

24 October 2008

Canada	29−0	Jamaica

24 October 2008

Barbados	10−5	Cayman Islands

== Playoffs ==
=== Plate ===
Semi-finals
25 October 2018
Cayman Islands	0
Jamaica	34
25 October 2018
Barbados	10
Bermuda	15

Final
25 October 2018
Jamaica	53
Bermuda	0
Seventh Place
25 October 2018
Cayman Islands	10
Barbados	5

=== Cup ===
Quarter-finals
25 October 2018
United States	67
Cayman Islands	0
25 October 2018
Guyana	12
Jamaica	0
25 October 2018
Trinidad and Tobago	34
Barbados	0
25 October 2018
Bermuda	0
Canada	34

Semi-finals
25 October 2018
United States	59
Guyana	0
25 October 2018
Trinidad and Tobago	0
Canada	41

Final
25 October 2018
United States	14
Canada	19
Third place
25 October 2018
Guyana	15
Trinidad and Tobago	5
