= 2019 RAN Women's Sevens =

- Host nation: George Town
- Date: 6–7 July

Cup
- Champion: Mexico
- Runner-up: Jamaica
- Third: Saint Lucia

Tournament details
- Matches played: 18

The 2019 RAN Women's Sevens was the 15th edition of the annual rugby sevens tournament organized by Rugby Americas North. It was played at the Truman Bodden Sports Complex in George Town, Cayman Islands. Six national teams played a round robin. With Canada and the United States already eligible for the 2020 Summer Olympics by way of the 2018–19 World Rugby Women's Sevens Series, the top two finishing teams of the tournament are eligible for a 2020 repechage tournament.

== Teams ==
The following six teams participated:

- Bahamas
- Bermuda
- Jamaica
- Mexico
- Saint Lucia
- Trinidad and Tobago

== Pool stage ==
All times in Eastern Standard Time (UTC−05:00)

Legend
Advance to finals
Advance to third place match
Advance to fifth place match

Team	Pld	W	D	L	PF	PA	PD	Pts
Jamaica	5	5	0	0	164	24	+140	15
Mexico	5	3	1	1	112	49	+63	10
Saint Lucia	5	3	0	2	73	42	+31	9
Trinidad and Tobago	5	2	1	2	88	61	+27	7
Bermuda	5	1	0	4	15	156	–141	3
Bahamas	5	0	0	5	20	140	–120	0

6 July 2019
10:00

Mexico	17–5	Saint Lucia

Truman Bodden Sports Complex, George Town

6 July 2019
10:22

Trinidad and Tobago	34–0	Bahamas

Truman Bodden Sports Complex, George Town

6 July 2019
10:44

Jamaica	55–0	Bermuda

Truman Bodden Sports Complex, George Town

6 July 2019
12:34

Trinidad and Tobago	5–17	Saint Lucia

Truman Bodden Sports Complex, George Town

6 July 2019
12:56

Mexico	37–0	Bermuda

Truman Bodden Sports Complex, George Town

6 July 2019
13:18

Jamaica	36–5	Bahamas

Truman Bodden Sports Complex, George Town

6 July 2019
15:30

Jamaica	20–5	Saint Lucia

Truman Bodden Sports Complex, George Town

6 July 2019
15:52

Bahamas	10–15	Bermuda

Truman Bodden Sports Complex, George Town

6 July 2019
16:14

Mexico	15–15	Trinidad and Tobago

Truman Bodden Sports Complex, George Town

7 July 2019
10:58

Mexico	36–5	Bahamas

Truman Bodden Sports Complex, George Town

7 July 2019
11:20

Trinidad and Tobago	7–29	Jamaica

Truman Bodden Sports Complex, George Town

7 July 2019
11:42

Saint Lucia	27–0	Bermuda

Truman Bodden Sports Complex, George Town

7 July 2019
13:32

Saint Lucia	19–0	Bahamas

Truman Bodden Sports Complex, George Town

7 July 2019
13:54

Trinidad and Tobago	27–0	Bermuda

Truman Bodden Sports Complex, George Town

7 July 2019
14:16

Mexico	7–24	Jamaica

Truman Bodden Sports Complex, George Town

== Placement stage ==
5th place

7 July 2019
15:50

Bermuda	5–22	Bahamas

Truman Bodden Sports Complex, George Town

3rd place

7 July 2019
16:12

Saint Lucia	22–0	Trinidad and Tobago

Truman Bodden Sports Complex, George Town

Final

7 July 2019
16:52

Jamaica	15–19	Mexico

Truman Bodden Sports Complex, George Town

== Standings ==
Legend
Qualified for the 2020 Repechage

Rank	Team
1st place, gold medalist(s)	Mexico
2nd place, silver medalist(s)	Jamaica
3rd place, bronze medalist(s)	Saint Lucia
4	Trinidad and Tobago
5	Bahamas
6	Bermuda
