= 2006 NAWIRA Women's Sevens =

- Hosts: Barbados
- Date: 11–12 November 2006
- Nations: 6

Final positions
- Champions: USA Development Eagles
- Runners-up: Jamaica
- Third: Trinidad and Tobago

The 2006 NAWIRA Women's Sevens was the tournament's second edition and was held on 11 and 12 November 2006 in Garrison Savannah, Barbados. The competition was played as a round-robin with six teams, the USA Development Eagles won the tournament.

== Tournament ==
=== Standings ===
Nation	P	W	D	L	PF	PA	PD	Pts
USA Development Eagles	5	5	0	0	147	0	+147	15
Jamaica	5	3	1	1	94	27	+67	12
Trinidad and Tobago	5	3	0	2	80	55	+25	11
Guyana	5	2	1	2	41	67	–26	10
Saint Lucia	5	1	0	4	25	141	–116	7
Barbados	5	0	0	5	5	176	–171	5

=== Matches ===
==== Day 1 ====
11 November 2006

USA Development Eagles	22–0	Jamaica

11 November 2006

Trinidad and Tobago	14–5	Guyana

11 November 2006

Barbados	0–41	USA Development Eagles

11 November 2006

Barbados	0–34	Jamaica

11 November 2006

USA Development Eagles	19–0	Guyana

11 November 2006

Trinidad and Tobago	25–0	Saint Lucia

11 November 2006

Barbados	0–34	Guyana

11 November 2006

USA Development Eagles	41–0	Saint Lucia

==== Day 2 ====
12 November 2006

Guyana	0–0	Jamaica

12 November 2006

Barbados	0–42	Trinidad and Tobago

12 November 2006

Jamaica	34–0	Saint Lucia

12 November 2006

USA Development Eagles	24–0	Trinidad and Tobago

12 November 2006

Barbados	5–25	Saint Lucia

12 November 2006

Guyana	36–0	Saint Lucia

12 November 2006

Jamaica	26–5	Trinidad and Tobago
