= 2017 Hong Kong Women's Sevens =

- Women's Sevens Series V
- Host nation: Hong Kong
- Date: 6–7 April 2017

Cup
- Champion: Japan
- Runner-up: South Africa
- Third: Belgium

Tournament details
- Matches played: 25
- Most points: Mayu Shimizu

The 2017 Hong Kong Women's Sevens acted as a qualifier for the 2017–18 World Rugby Women's Sevens Series. The tournament was played on 7–8 April 2017 at Hong Kong Stadium in Hong Kong alongside the 2017 Hong Kong Sevens for men.

== Format ==
12 teams, split into three groups of four. The group winners, runners up and the two best third ranked teams will enter the knockout stage. The overall winner will gain a spot on the 2017-18 World Rugby Women's Sevens series.

== Teams ==
The 12 teams qualified as a result of their placings in continental competitions.

Europe
- Netherlands
- Italy
- Belgium

Asia

- Japan
- Hong Kong
- China

Africa

- South Africa
- Kenya

South America

- Colombia
- Argentina

North America

- Jamaica

Oceania

- Papua New Guinea

== Pool Stage ==
Key to colours in group tables
Teams that advanced to the Cup Quarterfinal

=== Pool A ===
Team	Pld	W	D	L	PF	PA	PD	Pts
Japan	3	3	0	0	97	19	+78	9
Netherlands	3	2	0	1	48	48	0	7
China	3	1	0	2	101	42	+59	5
Jamaica	3	0	0	3	7	144	–137	3

6 April 2017
10:44

China	19–21	Netherlands

So Kon Po Recreation Ground, Hong Kong

6 April 2017
11:06

Japan	54–0	Jamaica

So Kon Po Recreation Ground, Hong Kong

6 April 2017
13:06

China	68–0	Jamaica

So Kon Po Recreation Ground, Hong Kong

6 April 2017
13:28

Japan	22–5	Netherlands

So Kon Po Recreation Ground, Hong Kong

6 April 2017
15:40

Netherlands	22–7	Jamaica

So Kon Po Recreation Ground, Hong Kong

6 April 2017
16:02

Japan	21–14	China

So Kon Po Recreation Ground, Hong Kong

=== Pool B ===
Team	Pld	W	D	L	PF	PA	PD	Pts
Belgium	3	2	0	1	43	20	+23	7
Kenya	3	2	0	1	46	35	+11	7
Argentina	3	1	0	2	24	50	–26	5
Hong Kong	3	1	0	2	43	51	–8	5

6 April 2017
11:28

Kenya	24–21	Hong Kong

So Kon Po Recreation Ground, Hong Kong

6 April 2017
11:50

Argentina	0–26	Belgium

So Kon Po Recreation Ground, Hong Kong

6 April 2017
13:50

Kenya	5–7	Belgium

So Kon Po Recreation Ground, Hong Kong

6 April 2017
14:12

Argentina	17–7	Hong Kong

So Kon Po Recreation Ground, Hong Kong

6 April 2017
16:24

Hong Kong	15–10	Belgium

So Kon Po Recreation Ground, Hong Kong

6 April 2017
16:46

Argentina	7–17	Kenya

So Kon Po Recreation Ground, Hong Kong

=== Pool C ===
Team	Pld	W	D	L	PF	PA	PD	Pts
South Africa	3	2	0	1	62	22	+40	7
Italy	3	2	0	1	37	22	+15	7
Papua New Guinea	3	2	0	1	38	29	+9	7
Colombia	3	0	0	3	5	69	–64	3

6 April 2017
10:00

Colombia	0–19	Papua New Guinea

So Kon Po Recreation Ground, Hong Kong

6 April 2017
10:22

South Africa	5–15	Italy

So Kon Po Recreation Ground, Hong Kong

6 April 2017
12:22

Colombia	5–17	Italy

So Kon Po Recreation Ground, Hong Kong

6 April 2017
12:44

South Africa	24–7	Papua New Guinea

So Kon Po Recreation Ground, Hong Kong

6 April 2017
14:56

Papua New Guinea	12–5	Italy

So Kon Po Recreation Ground, Hong Kong

6 April 2017
15:18

South Africa	33–0	Colombia

So Kon Po Recreation Ground, Hong Kong

== Knockout stage ==
Quarter-finals
7 April 2017 – 09:22 – So Kon Po Rec Ground
South Africa	29
Papua New Guinea	7
7 April 2017 – 09:44 – So Kon Po Rec Ground
Belgium	14
Netherlands	12
7 April 2017 – 10:06 – So Kon Po Rec Ground
Italy	26
Kenya	7
7 April 2017 – 10:28 – So Kon Po Rec Ground
Japan	28
China	14

Semi-finals
7 April 2017 – 14:12 – Hong Kong Stadium
South Africa	17
Belgium	7
7 April 2017 – 14:34 – Hong Kong Stadium
Italy	0
Japan	31

World Series Qualifier Final
7 April 2017 – 17:12 – Hong Kong Stadium
South Africa	10
Japan	22

== Final standings ==
Legend
Winner and Qualified for the 2017-18 World Rugby Women's Sevens Series

Rank	Team
1st place, gold medalist(s)	Japan
2nd place, silver medalist(s)	South Africa
3rd place, bronze medalist(s)	Belgium
4	Italy
5	Kenya
6	Papua New Guinea
7	Netherlands
8	China
9	Hong Kong
10	Argentina
11	Colombia
12	Jamaica

== See also ==
- 2017 Hong Kong Sevens
- 2016-17 World Rugby Women's Sevens Series

Hong Kong Women's Sevens
Preceded by 2016 Hong Kong Women's Sevens	2017 Hong Kong Women's Sevens	Succeeded by 2018 Hong Kong Women's Sevens
