= 2017 RAN Women's Sevens =

- Hosts: Mexico
- Date: 25–26 November
- Nations: 7

Final positions
- Champions: Mexico
- Runners-up: French Guiana
- Third: Jamaica

Series details
- Matches played: 21

The 2017 RAN Women's Sevens will be the thirteenth tournament of the RAN Women's Sevens, the official rugby sevens continental championships organized by RAN. Both the women's and men's competitions were held at Campo Marte in Mexico City on 25–26 November 2017.

Seven national teams will take part in a two-day round robin tournament. The winner will be eligible to participate in the 2018 Rugby World Cup Sevens.

== Standings ==
All times are Central Standard Time (UTC−06:00)

Key to colours in group tables
Qualifies for the 2018 Rugby World Cup Sevens and 2018 Central American and Caribbean Games
Qualifies for the 2018 Central American and Caribbean Games

Teams	Pld	W	D	L	PF	PA	+/−	Pts
Mexico	6	5	0	1	109	52	+57	16
French Guiana	6	4	0	2	143	83	+60	14
Jamaica	6	4	0	2	132	74	+58	14
Trinidad and Tobago	6	4	0	2	86	58	+28	14
Guyana	6	2	1	3	60	96	−36	11
Dominican Republic	6	1	0	5	85	101	−16	8
Bermuda	6	0	1	5	19	170	−151	7

25 November 2017
11:00

Mexico	17−7	Dominican Republic

25 November 2017
11:00

Jamaica	12−19	Guyana

25 November 2017
11:22

Trinidad and Tobago	24−0	Bermuda

25 November 2017
12:50

Mexico	14−26	French Guiana

25 November 2017
13:12

Trinidad and Tobago	12−5	Guyana

25 November 2017
13:12

Jamaica	34−0	Bermuda

25 November 2017
15:02

Trinidad and Tobago	22−19	French Guiana

25 November 2017
15:02

Guyana	17−12	Dominican Republic

25 November 2017
15:24

Jamaica	7−22	Mexico

25 November 2017
16:52

Bermuda	0−40	Dominican Republic

26 November 2017
9:30

Mexico	34−0	Bermuda

26 November 2017
9:30

Dominican Republic	7−22	French Guiana

26 November 2017
9:52

Jamaica	29−5	Trinidad and Tobago

26 November 2017
11:20

Mexico	17−12	Guyana

26 November 2017
11:20

Bermuda	12−31	French Guiana

26 November 2017
11:42

Jamaica	24−14	Dominican Republic

26 November 2017
13:40

Guyana	7−7	Bermuda

26 November 2017
13:40

Trinidad and Tobago	21−5	Dominican Republic

26 November 2017
14:02

Jamaica	26−14	French Guiana

26 November 2017
16:00

Guyana	0−36	French Guiana

26 November 2017
17:06

Mexico	5−0	Trinidad and Tobago

== See also ==
- 2018 Rugby World Cup Sevens qualifying – Women
- 2017 RAN Sevens (men)
