= Mexico women's national rugby sevens team =

Mexico
- Union: Mexican Rugby Federation
- Nickname: Serpientes (snakes)
- Emblem: The Snake
- Coach: Alessandro Cordone
Team kit	Change kit

World Cup Sevens
- Appearances: 1 (First in 2018)

The Mexico women's national rugby union sevens team are a national sporting side that represents Mexico in Rugby sevens.

== History ==
Mexico qualified to the 2016 Final Olympic Qualification Tournament. In the aftermath of the 2017 RAN Women's Sevens, they made their Rugby World Cup Sevens debut in 2018. They had a more successful year at the 2019 RAN Women's Sevens tournament when they beat Jamaica in the finals and qualified for a spot at the 2020 Women's Rugby Sevens Final Olympic Qualification Tournament.

Mexico competed in the 2024 World Rugby Sevens Challenger Series in Dubai; they finished at the bottom of the women's standings in the first round. They finished twelfth overall at the 2024 Sevens Challenger Series.

== Tournament history ==
=== Rugby World Cup Sevens ===
Rugby World Cup Sevens
Year	Round	Position	Pld	W	L	D
(United Arab Emirates) 2009	Did not enter					
(Russia) 2013	Did not qualify					
(United States) 2018	15th Place	16th	4	0	4	0
(South Africa) 2022	Did not qualify					
Total	0 Titles	1/4	4	0	4	0

=== Rugby Americas North Women's Sevens ===
RAN Women's Sevens record
Year	Round	Position
(Mexico) 2009	Third	3rd
(Guyana) 2010	Fifth	5th
(Barbados) 2011	Plate Semifinalists	7th
(Canada) 2012	Semifinalists	4th
(Cayman Islands) 2013	Finalists	2nd
(Mexico) 2014	Champions	1st
(United States) 2015	Finalists	2nd
(Trinidad and Tobago) 2016	Semifinalists	3rd
(Mexico) 2017	Champions	1st
(Barbados) 2018	Champions	1st
(Guyana) 2019	Champions	1st
(The Bahamas) 2022 (Apr)	Finalists	2nd
(Mexico) 2022 (Nov)	Champions	1st
(Canada) 2023	Finalists	2nd

=== Central American and Caribbean Games ===
CACG record
Year	Round	Position
(Mexico) 2014	Semifinalists	3rd
(Colombia) 2018	Semifinalists	3rd
(El Salvador) 2023	Finalists	2nd

=== Pan American Games ===
Pan American Games
Year	Round	Position
(Canada) 2015	Fifth Place Game	5th
(Peru) 2019	Seventh Place Game	7th
(Chile) 2023	Fifth Place Game	6th

== Players ==
Mexico's squad to the 2024 World Rugby Sevens Challenger Series:

No.	Players
1	Isabel Rodriguez
2	Daniela Cordero
3	Jazmin Hernandez
4	Maria Fernanda Tovar
5	Daniela Alvarado
6	Alessandra Bender
7	Laura Rodríguez
8	Denise Ortiz
9	Zoe Tuyú
10	Yazmin Ramirez
11	Esthefanny Espindola
12	Gissela De Leon
