= Cayman Islands women's national rugby sevens team =

Cayman Islands
- Union: Cayman Rugby Football Union

World Cup Sevens
- Appearances: 0

The Cayman Islands women's national rugby sevens team represents the Cayman Islands in international sevens rugby. They often compete in the RAN Women's Sevens tournaments.

== History ==
The Cayman Islands made their sevens international debut at the 2008 NAWIRA Women's Sevens in the Bahamas. They competed at the 2022 RAN Women's Sevens Qualifiers in Nassau, Bahamas.

== Players ==
=== Recent squad ===
Squad to 2022 RAN Women's Sevens Qualifiers.

=== Previous squad ===
Cayman Sevens Squad vs. Jamaica 2000:

- Karen Jessup
- Jessica Lane
- Tracy Iler
- Lisa Kehoe
- Janie Fleming
- Jane Robson
- Lorna Campbell
- Sinead Quinn
- Julie Falconer
- Rebecca Heap
- Michelle Cascante
- Angelique Crowther
- Sharon Hedger
