= Rugby sevens at the 2024 Summer Olympics – Women's qualification =

Qualification for the women's rugby sevens tournament at the Paris 2024 Summer Olympics took place from November 2022 to June 2024, selecting twelve teams. All six World Rugby zones were to have a continental rugby sevens representative in the tournament. The host nation France reserved a direct quota place, with the remainder of the quota attributed to the eligible National Olympic Committee (NOCs) across three qualifying routes.

The top four teams from the 2022–23 World Rugby Women's Sevens Series secured Paris 2024 spots for their respective NOCs. Then, six further places were awarded to each of the six confederations (Africa, Asia, Europe, Oceania, North America, and South America) at their designated 2023 World Rugby Regional Association Olympic Qualification Tournaments. The remaining berth in the twelve-team field went to the winner of the 2024 Final Olympic Qualification Tournament, which was scheduled a month before the Games, held on 21–23 June 2024 at Stade Louis II in Monaco.

== Qualified teams ==
Qualification	Date	Host	Berths	Qualified team
Host nation	—N/a		1	France
2022–23 World Rugby Women's Sevens Series	4 November 2022 – 14 May 2023	Various	4	New Zealand
2022–23 World Rugby Women's Sevens Series	4 November 2022 – 14 May 2023	Various	4	Australia
2022–23 World Rugby Women's Sevens Series	4 November 2022 – 14 May 2023	Various	4	United States
2022–23 World Rugby Women's Sevens Series	4 November 2022 – 14 May 2023	Various	4	(Republic of Ireland) Ireland
2023 South American Qualification Tournament	17–18 June 2023	(Uruguay) Montevideo	1	Brazil
2023 European Games	25–27 June 2023	(Poland) Kraków	1	(United Kingdom) Great Britain
2023 RAN Women's Sevens	19–20 August 2023	(Canada) Langford	1	Canada
2023 Africa Women's Sevens	14–15 October 2023	(Tunisia) Monastir	1	South Africa
2023 Oceania Women's Sevens Championship	10–12 November 2023	(Australia) Brisbane	1	Fiji
2023 Asian Qualification Tournament	18–19 November 2023	(Japan) Osaka	1	Japan
2024 Final Olympic Qualification Tournament	21–23 June 2024	Monaco	1	China
Total			12	

== 2022–23 World Rugby Women's Sevens Series ==
As a principal route for the tournament, the top four teams secured their spots for Paris 2024 based on the total points accrued throughout the seven-tournament series.

2022–23 World Rugby Sevens – Women's Series X
Pos	Event Team	Dubai	Cape Town	Hamilton	Sydney	Vancouver	Hong Kong	Toulouse	Total points
1	New Zealand	18	20	20	20	20	20	20	138
2	Australia	20	18	16	12	18	18	16	118
3	United States	16	16	18	16	16	8	18	108
4	France	14	12	8	18	14	12	14	92
5	Ireland	10	14	14	14	6	6	10	74
6	Fiji	12	8	6	10	12	14	6	68 (Note: Tie-breaker margin of points scored for and against in all matches: Fiji +51, Great Britain –36.)
7	(United Kingdom) Great Britain	6	10	12	8	8	16	8	68
8	Japan	3	2	10	6	4	3	12	40
9	Canada	4	6	2	4	10	10	3	39
10	Spain	8	3	4	2	3	4	4	28
11	Brazil	1	4	3	3	2	2	1	16
12	China	2	—	—	—	—	—	—	2
13	Papua New Guinea	—	—	1	1	—	—	—	2
14	Poland	—	—	—	—	—	—	2	2
15	South Africa	—	1	—	—	—	—	—	1
16	Hong Kong	—	—	—	—	—	1	—	1
17	Colombia	—	—	—	—	1	—	—	1

Source: World Rugby

Legend
No colour	Core team in 2022–23 and qualified as a core team for 2023–24
Yellow	Not a core team
Qualified as one of the four highest-placed eligible teams in the 2022–23 World Women's Sevens Series
Automatically qualified (host country France)

== 2023 Africa Women's Sevens ==
2023 Africa Women's Sevens took place from 14 to 15 October 2023 in Monastir, Tunisia, with the pre-qualifying meet staged in Zambia on 1–2 July 2023, won by Zambia.

- Ghana
- Kenya
- Madagascar
- South Africa
- Tunisia
- Uganda
- Zambia
- Zimbabwe

=== Pool stage ===
Pool A

Pos	Team	Pld	W	D	L	PF	PA	PD	Pts	Qualification
1	South Africa	3	3	0	0	72	12	+60	9	Semi-finals
2	Uganda	3	2	0	1	34	24	+10	7	Semi-finals
3	Tunisia	3	1	0	2	38	44	−6	5	
4	Zimbabwe	3	0	0	3	10	74	−64	3	

Rules for classification: 1) points; 2) head-to-head points; 3) head-to-head point difference; 4) head-to-head number of points scored; 5) point difference.

Pool B

Pos	Team	Pld	W	D	L	PF	PA	PD	Pts	Qualification
1	Kenya	3	3	0	0	89	17	+72	9	Semi-finals
2	Zambia	3	2	0	1	32	52	−20	7	Semi-finals
3	Madagascar	3	1	0	2	66	47	+19	5	
4	Ghana	3	0	0	3	20	91	−71	3	

Rules for classification: 1) points; 2) head-to-head points; 3) head-to-head point difference; 4) head-to-head number of points scored; 5) point difference.

=== Knockout stage ===
Semi-finals
15 October – Monastir
South Africa	31
Zambia	0
15 October – Monastir
Kenya	27
Uganda	0

Final
15 October – Monastir
South Africa	12
Kenya	7
Third place
15 October – Monastir
Zambia	10
Uganda	29

=== Ranking ===
Rank	Team
1st place, gold medalist(s)	South Africa
2nd place, silver medalist(s)	Kenya
3rd place, bronze medalist(s)	Uganda
4	Zambia
5	Madagascar
6	Tunisia
7	Zimbabwe
8	Ghana

Qualified for the 2024 Summer Olympics
Qualified for the Final Olympic Rugby Sevens Qualifier

== 2023 Asia Rugby Women's Sevens Olympic Qualifying Tournament ==
The 2023 Asia Rugby Women's Sevens Olympic Qualifying Tournament ran from 18 to 19 November 2023 at the Yodoko Sakura Stadium, Osaka, Japan.

=== Pool stage ===
Pool A

Pos	Team	Pld	W	D	L	PF	PA	PD	Pts	Qualification
1	Japan	2	2	0	0	62	0	+62	6	Semi-finals
2	Thailand	2	1	0	1	22	19	+3	4	Semi-finals
3	Kazakhstan	2	0	0	2	0	65	−65	2	

Rules for classification: 1) points; 2) head-to-head points; 3) head-to-head point difference; 4) head-to-head number of points scored; 5) point difference.

Pool B

Pos	Team	Pld	W	D	L	PF	PA	PD	Pts	Qualification
1	China	3	3	0	0	164	0	+164	9	Semi-finals
2	Hong Kong	3	2	0	1	77	55	+22	7	Semi-finals
3	India	3	1	0	2	33	112	−79	5	
4	Guam	3	0	0	3	21	128	−107	3	

Rules for classification: 1) points; 2) head-to-head points; 3) head-to-head point difference; 4) head-to-head number of points scored; 5) point difference.

=== Knockout stage ===
Semi-finals
19 November – Osaka
Japan	33
Hong Kong	5
19 November – Osaka
China	29
Thailand	5

Final
19 November – Osaka
Japan	21
China	14
Third place
19 November – Osaka
Hong Kong	12
Thailand	0

=== Ranking ===
Rank	Team
1st place, gold medalist(s)	Japan
2nd place, silver medalist(s)	China
3rd place, bronze medalist(s)	Hong Kong
4	Thailand
5	Kazakhstan
6	India
7	Guam

Qualified for the 2024 Summer Olympics
Qualified for the Final Olympic Rugby Sevens Qualifier

== 2023 European Games ==
The 2023 European Games in Kraków and Małopolska, Poland served as the European qualification tournament. Twelve teams competed with the winner securing the Paris 2024 ticket.

=== Qualified teams ===
Qualification	Date	Host	Berths	Qualified team
Host nation	—N/a	—N/a	1	Poland
2022–23 World Rugby Women's Sevens Series	4 November 2022 – 21 May 2023	Various	~~3~~2	Great Britain
2022–23 World Rugby Women's Sevens Series	4 November 2022 – 21 May 2023	Various	~~3~~2	~~Ireland~~
2022–23 World Rugby Women's Sevens Series	4 November 2022 – 21 May 2023	Various	~~3~~2	Spain
2022 Rugby Europe Women's Sevens Championship Series	25 June – 3 July 2022	(Portugal) Lisbon (Poland) Kraków	4	Belgium
2022 Rugby Europe Women's Sevens Championship Series	25 June – 3 July 2022	(Portugal) Lisbon (Poland) Kraków	4	Czech Republic
2022 Rugby Europe Women's Sevens Championship Series	25 June – 3 July 2022	(Portugal) Lisbon (Poland) Kraków	4	Germany
2022 Rugby Europe Women's Sevens Championship Series	25 June – 3 July 2022	(Portugal) Lisbon (Poland) Kraków	4	Romania
2022 Rugby Europe Women's Sevens Trophy	11–19 June 2022	(Croatia) Zagreb (Hungary) Budapest	4	Italy
2022 Rugby Europe Women's Sevens Trophy	11–19 June 2022	(Croatia) Zagreb (Hungary) Budapest	4	Portugal
2022 Rugby Europe Women's Sevens Trophy	11–19 June 2022	(Croatia) Zagreb (Hungary) Budapest	4	Sweden
2022 Rugby Europe Women's Sevens Trophy	11–19 June 2022	(Croatia) Zagreb (Hungary) Budapest	4	Turkey
Replacing Ireland following their qualification for Paris 2024 (Note: As Ireland have already secured their place in the women's Olympic event with a top four placement in the World Rugby Women's Sevens Series, the Irish women's team vacated their European Games quota, which was subsequently awarded to Norway.)	—N/a		1	Norway
			12	

=== Pool stage ===
Pool A

Pos	Team	Pld	W	D	L	PF	PA	PD	Pts	Qualification
1	Great Britain	3	3	0	0	128	10	+118	9	Quarter-finals
2	Czech Republic	3	2	0	1	64	42	+22	7	Quarter-finals
3	Italy	3	1	0	2	67	64	+3	5	Possible quarter-finals
4	Norway	3	0	0	3	0	143	−143	3	

Source: 2023 European Games
Rules for classification: 1) points; 2) head-to-head points; 3) head-to-head point difference; 4) head-to-head number of points scored; 5) point difference.

Pool B

Pos	Team	Pld	W	D	L	PF	PA	PD	Pts	Qualification
1	Poland	3	3	0	0	119	7	+112	9	Quarter-finals
2	Portugal	3	2	0	1	55	48	+7	7	Quarter-finals
3	Germany	3	1	0	2	55	67	−12	5	Possible quarter-finals
4	Turkey	3	0	0	3	10	117	−107	3	

Source: 2023 European Games
Rules for classification: 1) points; 2) head-to-head points; 3) head-to-head point difference; 4) head-to-head number of points scored; 5) point difference.

Pool C

Pos	Team	Pld	W	D	L	PF	PA	PD	Pts	Qualification
1	Spain	3	3	0	0	106	7	+99	9	Quarter-finals
2	Belgium	3	2	0	1	86	29	+57	7	Quarter-finals
3	Romania	3	1	0	2	19	92	−73	5	Possible quarter-finals
4	Sweden	3	0	0	3	12	95	−83	3	

Source: 2023 European Games
Rules for classification: 1) points; 2) head-to-head points; 3) head-to-head point difference; 4) head-to-head number of points scored; 5) point difference.

Ranking of third-placed teams

The top two third-place teams joined the winners and runners-up in the quarter-finals.

Pos	Team	Pld	W	D	L	PF	PA	PD	Pts	Qualification
1	Italy	3	1	0	2	67	64	+3	5	Quarter-finals
2	Germany	3	1	0	2	55	67	−12	5	Quarter-finals
3	Romania	3	1	0	2	19	92	−73	5	

Source: 2023 European Games
Rules for classification: 1) points; 2) point difference.

=== Knockout stage ===
Quarter-finals
26 June – Kraków
Great Britain	53
Germany	0
26 June – Kraków
Portugal	5
Belgium	22
26 June – Kraków
Poland	33
Italy	15
26 June – Kraków
Spain	12
Czech Republic	17

Semi-finals
27 June – Kraków
Great Britain	36
Belgium	12
27 June – Kraków
Poland	29
Czech Republic	7

Final
27 June – Kraków
Great Britain	33
Poland	0
Bronze Final
27 June – Kraków
Belgium	17
Czech Republic	24

=== Ranking ===
Rank	Team
1st place, gold medalist(s)	Great Britain
2nd place, silver medalist(s)	Poland
3rd place, bronze medalist(s)	Czech Republic
4	Belgium
5	Spain
6	Germany
7	Italy
8	Portugal
9	Sweden
10	Romania
11	Norway
12	Turkey

Qualified for the 2024 Summer Olympics
Qualified for the Final Olympic Rugby Sevens Qualifier

== 2023 RAN Women's Sevens ==
2023 RAN Women's Sevens took place from 19 to 20 August 2023 in Langford, British Columbia, Canada.

=== Teams ===
The following teams will participate.

- Canada
- Jamaica
- Mexico
- Saint Lucia

=== Pool stage ===
Pos	Team	Pld	W	D	L	PF	PA	PD	Pts	Qualification
1	Canada	3	3	0	0	194	0	+194	9	Semi-finals
2	Jamaica	3	2	0	1	43	70	−27	7	Semi-finals
3	Mexico	3	1	0	2	26	97	−71	5	Semi-finals
4	Saint Lucia	3	0	0	3	15	111	−96	3	Semi-finals

Source: RAN Sevens Rugby Americas
Rules for classification: 1) points; 2) head-to-head points; 3) head-to-head point difference; 4) head-to-head number of points scored; 5) point difference.

=== Knockout stage ===
Semi-finals
20 August - Langford
Canada	41
Saint Lucia	7
20 August - Langford
Jamaica	12
Mexico	19

Final
20 August - Langford
Canada	53
Mexico	0
Third place
20 August - Langford
Saint Lucia	12
Jamaica	27

=== Ranking ===
Rank	Team
1st place, gold medalist(s)	Canada
2nd place, silver medalist(s)	Mexico
3rd place, bronze medalist(s)	Jamaica
4	Saint Lucia

Qualified for the 2024 Summer Olympics
Qualified for the Final Olympic Rugby Sevens Qualifier

== 2023 Oceania Women's Sevens Championship ==
The 2023 Oceania Women's Sevens Championship ran from 10 to 12 November 2023 at Ballymore Stadium in Brisbane, Queensland, Australia.

The following teams competed for Olympic qualification:

- American Samoa
- Cook Islands
- Fiji
- Nauru
- Papua New Guinea
- Samoa
- Solomon Islands
- Tonga

The following teams competed in the championships but had already claimed an Olympic berth:

- Australia
- New Zealand

=== Pool stage ===
Pool B (Olympic)

Pos	Team	Pld	W	D	L	PF	PA	PD	Pts	Qualification
1	Fiji	3	3	0	0	158	5	+153	9	Olympic qualifier semi-finals
2	Tonga	3	2	0	1	47	40	+7	7	Olympic qualifier semi-finals
3	American Samoa	3	1	0	2	28	121	−93	5	
4	Cook Islands	3	0	0	3	21	88	−67	3	

Rules for classification: 1) points; 2) head-to-head points; 3) head-to-head point difference; 4) head-to-head number of points scored; 5) point difference.

Pool C (Olympic)

Pos	Team	Pld	W	D	L	PF	PA	PD	Pts	Qualification
1	Papua New Guinea	3	3	0	0	127	7	+120	9	Olympic qualifier semi-finals
2	Samoa	3	2	0	1	91	36	+55	7	Olympic qualifier semi-finals
3	Solomon Islands	3	1	0	2	41	75	−34	5	
4	Nauru	3	0	0	3	0	141	−141	3	

Rules for classification: 1) points; 2) head-to-head points; 3) head-to-head point difference; 4) head-to-head number of points scored; 5) point difference.

=== Olympic qualification play-offs ===
Olympic qualifier semi-finals
12 November - Brisbane
Fiji	42
Samoa	0
12 November - Brisbane
Papua New Guinea	21
Tonga	10

Olympic qualifier final
12 November - Brisbane
Fiji	54
Papua New Guinea	0
Fifth place
12 November - Brisbane
Samoa	22
Tonga	5

=== Ranking of teams competing for an Olympic berth ===
Rank	Team
1st place, gold medalist(s)	Fiji
2nd place, silver medalist(s)	Papua New Guinea
3rd place, bronze medalist(s)	Samoa
4	Tonga
5	Cook Islands
6	American Samoa
7	Solomon Islands
8	Nauru

Qualified for the 2024 Summer Olympics
Qualified for the Final Olympic Rugby Sevens Qualifier

== 2023 South American Qualification Tournament ==
The 2023 South American Qualification Tournament, scheduled for 17–18 June 2023, was played in Montevideo, Uruguay. Seven countries with full World Rugby membership were invited to participate in the women's tournament.

The following teams participated:

- Argentina
- Brazil
- Chile
- Colombia
- Paraguay
- Peru
- Uruguay

=== Tournament ===
Pool stage

Pos	Team	Pld	W	D	L	PF	PA	PD	Pts	Qualification
1	Brazil	6	6	0	0	202	12	+190	18	Qualified for 2024 Olympics
2	Argentina	6	5	0	1	181	24	+157	16	Qualified for Olympic Repechage
3	Paraguay	6	3	1	2	85	103	−18	13	Qualified for Olympic Repechage
4	Colombia	6	2	1	3	82	95	−13	11	
5	Chile	6	2	0	4	50	157	−107	10	
6	Uruguay	6	2	0	4	48	141	−93	10	
7	Peru	6	0	0	6	31	147	−116	6	

Source: Sudamérica Rugby
Rules for classification: 1) points; 2) head-to-head points; 3) head-to-head point difference; 4) head-to-head number of points scored; 5) point difference.

=== Ranking ===
Rank	Team
1st place, gold medalist(s)	Brazil
2nd place, silver medalist(s)	Argentina
3rd place, bronze medalist(s)	Paraguay
4	Colombia
5	Chile
6	Uruguay
7	Peru

Qualified for the 2024 Summer Olympics
Qualified for the Final Olympic Rugby Sevens Qualifier

== 2024 Final Olympic Qualifying Tournament ==
The 2024 Final Olympic Qualifying Tournament was scheduled for 21–23 June 2024 in Monaco. Two runners-up from each of the six continental confederations were eligible to participate in the tournament with the winner earning the last remaining spot for Paris 2024.

=== Qualified teams ===
Qualification	Date	Host	Berths	Qualified team
2023 South American Qualification Tournament	17–18 June 2023	(Uruguay) Montevideo	2	Argentina
2023 South American Qualification Tournament	17–18 June 2023	(Uruguay) Montevideo	2	Paraguay
2023 European Games	25–27 June 2023	(Poland) Kraków	2	Poland
2023 European Games	25–27 June 2023	(Poland) Kraków	2	Czech Republic
2023 RAN Women's Sevens	19–20 August 2023	(Canada) Langford	2	Mexico
2023 RAN Women's Sevens	19–20 August 2023	(Canada) Langford	2	Jamaica
2023 Africa Women's Sevens	14–15 October 2023	(Tunisia) Monastir	2	Kenya
2023 Africa Women's Sevens	14–15 October 2023	(Tunisia) Monastir	2	Uganda
2023 Oceania Women's Sevens Championship	10–12 November 2023	(Australia) Brisbane	2	Papua New Guinea
2023 Oceania Women's Sevens Championship	10–12 November 2023	(Australia) Brisbane	2	Samoa
2023 Asian Qualification Tournament	18–19 November 2023	(Japan) Osaka	2	China
2023 Asian Qualification Tournament	18–19 November 2023	(Japan) Osaka	2	Hong Kong
Total			12	

=== Pool stage ===
Pool A

Pos	Team	Pld	W	D	L	PF	PA	PD	Pts	Qualification
1	Argentina	2	2	0	0	50	22	+28	6	Quarter-finals
2	Kenya	1	1	0	0	43	24	+19	3	Quarter-finals
3	Samoa	0	0	0	0	10	57	−47	0	

First match(es) will be played: 21 June 2024. Source: TBA
Rules for classification: 1) points; 2) head-to-head points; 3) head-to-head point difference; 4) head-to-head number of points scored; 5) point difference.

Pool B

Pos	Team	Pld	W	D	L	PF	PA	PD	Pts	Qualification
1	Uganda	3	3	0	0	70	14	+56	9	Quarter-finals
2	Hong Kong	3	2	0	1	69	44	+25	7	Quarter-finals
3	Paraguay	3	1	0	2	51	78	−27	5	Quarter-finals
4	Jamaica	3	0	0	3	33	87	−54	3	

First match(es) will be played: 21 June 2024. Source: TBA
Rules for classification: 1) points; 2) head-to-head points; 3) head-to-head point difference; 4) head-to-head number of points scored; 5) point difference.

Pool C

Pos	Team	Pld	W	D	L	PF	PA	PD	Pts	Qualification
1	China	3	3	0	0	122	5	+117	9	Quarter-finals
2	Poland	3	2	0	1	84	33	+51	7	Quarter-finals
3	Czech Republic	3	1	0	2	57	65	−8	5	Quarter-finals
4	Mexico	3	0	0	3	0	160	−160	3	

First match(es) will be played: 21 June 2024. Source: TBA
Rules for classification: 1) points; 2) head-to-head points; 3) head-to-head point difference; 4) head-to-head number of points scored; 5) point difference.

=== Knockout stage ===
Quarterfinals
23 June 2024 – 09:30 – Stade Louis II
China	31
Paraguay	0
23 June 2024 – 10:42 – Stade Louis II
Poland	36
Hong Kong	0
23 June 2024 – 09:54 – Stade Louis II
Uganda	0
Czech Republic	22
23 June 2024 – 10:18 – Stade Louis II
Kenya	15
Argentina	12

Semifinals
23 June 2024 – 14:22 – Stade Louis II
China	40
Poland	7
23 June 2024 – 14:46 – Stade Louis II
Czech Republic	10
Kenya	12

Final
23 June 2024 – 18:01 – Stade Louis II
China	24
Kenya	7
3rd place final
23 June 2024 – 17:08 – Stade Louis II
Poland	33
Czech Republic	14

=== Ranking ===
Rank	Team
1	China
2	Kenya
3	Poland
4	Czech Republic
5	Uganda
5	Argentina
5	Hong Kong
5	Paraguay
9	Samoa
9	Jamaica
9	Mexico

Qualified for the 2024 Summer Olympics

== See also ==
- Rugby sevens at the 2024 Summer Olympics
