= Rugby sevens at the 2024 Summer Olympics =

Rugby sevens at the Games of the XXXIII Olympiad
- Venue: Stade de France
- Dates: 24–30 July 2024
- No. of events: 2 (1 men, 1 women)
- Competitors: 288 from 16 nations

The rugby sevens tournaments at the 2024 Summer Olympics in Paris took place from 24 to 30 July at Stade de France. Twenty-four teams (twelve each for men and women) competed against each other in their respective tournaments. For the first time, the rugby sevens matches commenced two days before the opening ceremony with the men's preliminary and quarterfinal stages. The competition took a break for the opening ceremony on 26 July before the medal-winning teams were officially unveiled a day later. The women's tournament was held from 28 to 30 July, culminating with the gold and bronze medal matches.

== Qualification ==
The International Olympic Committee and the World Rugby (WR) ratified and released the qualification criteria for the 2024 Summer Olympics. The host nation France was reserved a direct quota place each in the men's and women's tournament, with the remainder of the total quota attributed to the eligible National Olympic Committees (NOCs) across three qualifying routes.

The top four squads at the end of the 2022–23 World Rugby Sevens Series secured the men's and women's spots for their respective NOC, with the continental champions from each of the six confederations (Africa, Asia, Europe, Oceania, North America, and South America) receiving the berths at their designated 2023 World Rugby Regional Association Olympic Qualification Tournaments. To complete the twelve-team field for Paris 2024, the remaining spot will be offered to the winner of the 2024 Final Olympic Qualification Tournament, which took place a month before the Games commenced.

=== Qualification summary ===
Nation	Men's	Women's	Athletes
Argentina	Yes	—	12
Australia	Yes	Yes	24
Brazil	—	Yes	12
Canada	—	Yes	12
China	—	Yes	12
Fiji	Yes	Yes	24
France	Yes	Yes	24
Great Britain	—	Yes	12
Ireland	Yes	Yes	24
Japan	Yes	Yes	24
Kenya	Yes	—	12
New Zealand	Yes	Yes	24
Samoa	Yes	—	12
South Africa	Yes	Yes	24
United States	Yes	Yes	24
Uruguay	Yes	—	12
Total: 16 NOCs	12	12	288

=== Men's qualification ===
Qualification	Date	Host	Berths	Qualified team
Host nation	13 September 2017	—	1	France
2022–23 World Rugby Sevens Series	4 November 2022 – 21 May 2023	Various	4	New Zealand
2022–23 World Rugby Sevens Series	4 November 2022 – 21 May 2023	Various	4	Argentina
2022–23 World Rugby Sevens Series	4 November 2022 – 21 May 2023	Various	4	Fiji
2022–23 World Rugby Sevens Series	4 November 2022 – 21 May 2023	Various	4	Australia
2023 South American Qualification Tournament	17–18 June 2023	Montevideo	1	Uruguay
2023 European Games	25–27 June 2023	Kraków	1	Ireland
2023 RAN Sevens	19–20 August 2023	Langford	1	United States
2023 Africa Men's Sevens	16–17 September 2023	Harare	1	Kenya
2023 Oceania Sevens Championship	10–12 November 2023	Brisbane	1	Samoa
2023 Asian Qualification Tournament	18–19 November 2023	Osaka	1	Japan
2024 Final Olympic Qualification Tournament	21–23 June 2024	Fontvieille, Monaco	1	South Africa
Total			12	

=== Women's qualification ===
Qualification	Date	Host	Berths	Qualified team
Host nation	—		1	France
2022–23 World Rugby Women's Sevens Series	4 November 2022 – 14 May 2023	Various	4	New Zealand
2022–23 World Rugby Women's Sevens Series	4 November 2022 – 14 May 2023	Various	4	Australia
2022–23 World Rugby Women's Sevens Series	4 November 2022 – 14 May 2023	Various	4	United States
2022–23 World Rugby Women's Sevens Series	4 November 2022 – 14 May 2023	Various	4	(Republic of Ireland) Ireland
2023 South American Qualification Tournament	17–18 June 2023	(Uruguay) Montevideo	1	Brazil
2023 European Games	25–27 June 2023	(Poland) Kraków	1	(United Kingdom) Great Britain
2023 RAN Women's Sevens	19–20 August 2023	(Canada) Langford	1	Canada
2023 Africa Women's Sevens	14–15 October 2023	(Tunisia) Monastir	1	South Africa
2023 Oceania Women's Sevens Championship	10–12 November 2023	(Australia) Brisbane	1	Fiji
2023 Asian Qualification Tournament	18–19 November 2023	(Japan) Osaka	1	Japan
2024 Final Olympic Qualification Tournament	21–23 June 2024	Monaco	1	China
Total			12	

== Competition schedule ==
Legend

P	Pool Stage	PM	Placing Matches	¼	Quarter-Finals	½	Semi-Finals	B	Bronze Medal Match	F	Gold Medal Match

Schedule
Date	24 Jul		25 Jul			26 Jul	27 Jul					28 Jul		29 Jul			30 Jul				
Event	M	E	M	E			M		E			M	E	M	E		M		E		
Men's	P			PM	¼		PM	½	PM	B	F										
Women's												P			PM	¼	PM	½	PM	B	F

== Medal summary ==
A total of six medals were won by six NOC's.

=== Medal table ===
* Host nation (France)

Rank	NOC	Gold	Silver	Bronze	Total
1	France*	1	0	0	1
1	New Zealand	1	0	0	1
3	Canada	0	1	0	1
3	Fiji	0	1	0	1
5	South Africa	0	0	1	1
5	United States	0	0	1	1
Totals (6 entries)		2	2	2	6

=== Medalists ===
Event	Gold	Silver	Bronze
Men's tournament	France; Varian Pasquet; Andy Timo; Rayan Rebbadj; Théo Forner; Stephen Parez; Paulin Riva; Jefferson-Lee Joseph; Antoine Zeghdar; Aaron Grandidier Nkanang; Jean-Pascal Barraque; Antoine Dupont; Jordan Sepho; Nelson Epee	Fiji; Joji Nasova; Joseva Talacolo; Jeremia Matana; Sevuloni Mocenacagi; Iosefo Masi; Ponepati Loganimasi; Terio Veilawa; Waisea Nacuqu; Jerry Tuwai; Iowane Teba; Kaminieli Rasaku; Selestino Ravutaumada; Josaia Raisuqe; Filipe Sauturaga	South Africa; Christie Grobbelaar; Ryan Oosthuizen; Impi Visser; Zain Davids; Quewin Nortje; Tiaan Pretorius; Tristan Leyds; Selvyn Davids; Shaun Williams; Rosko Specman; Siviwe Soyizwapi; Shilton van Wyk; Ronald Brown
Women's tournament	New Zealand; Michaela Blyde; Jazmin Felix-Hotham; Sarah Hirini; Tyla King; Jorja Miller; Manaia Nuku; Mahina Paul; Risaleeana Pouri-Lane; Alena Saili; Theresa Setefano; Stacey Waaka; Portia Woodman-Wickliffe	Canada; Caroline Crossley; Olivia Apps; Alysha Corrigan; Asia Hogan-Rochester; Chloe Daniels; Charity Williams; Florence Symonds; Carissa Norsten; Krissy Scurfield; Fancy Bermudez; Piper Logan; Keyara Wardley; Taylor Perry; Shalaya Valenzuela	United States; Alev Kelter; Lauren Doyle; Kayla Canett; Kristi Kirshe; Ilona Maher; Ariana Ramsey; Naya Tapper; Alena Olsen; Alex Sedrick; Sammy Sullivan; Sarah Levy; Stephanie Rovetti

== Men's competition ==
=== Group stage ===
==== Group A ====
Pos	Team	Pld	W	D	L	PF	PA	PD	Pts	Qualification
1	New Zealand	3	3	0	0	71	29	+42	9	Advance to Quarter-finals
2	Ireland	3	2	0	1	62	24	+38	7	Advance to Quarter-finals
3	South Africa	3	1	0	2	59	32	+27	5	Advance to Quarter-finals
4	Japan	3	0	0	3	22	129	−107	3	

Source: World Rugby
Rules for classification: 1) Points; 2) Head-to-head result; 3) Point difference; 4) Points scored.

==== Group B ====
Pos	Team	Pld	W	D	L	PF	PA	PD	Pts	Qualification
1	Australia	3	3	0	0	64	35	+29	9	Advance to Quarter-finals
2	Argentina	3	2	0	1	73	46	+27	7	Advance to Quarter-finals
3	Samoa	3	1	0	2	52	49	+3	5	
4	Kenya	3	0	0	3	19	78	−59	3	

Source: World Rugby
Rules for classification: 1) Points; 2) Head-to-head result; 3) Point difference; 4) Points scored.

==== Group C ====
Pos	Team	Pld	W	D	L	PF	PA	PD	Pts	Qualification
1	Fiji	3	3	0	0	97	36	+61	9	Advance to Quarter-finals
2	France (H)	3	1	1	1	43	43	0	6	Advance to Quarter-finals
3	United States	3	1	1	1	57	67	−10	6	Advance to Quarter-finals
4	Uruguay	3	0	0	3	41	92	−51	3	

Source: World Rugby
Rules for classification: 1) Points; 2) Head-to-head result; 3) Point difference; 4) Points scored.
(H) Hosts

=== Knockout stage ===
==== Medal playoff ====
Quarter-finals
25 July – Stade de France
New Zealand	7
South Africa	14
25 July – Stade de France
Argentina	14
France	26
25 July – Stade de France
Fiji	19
Ireland	15
25 July – Stade de France
Australia	18
United States	0

Semi-finals
27 July – Stade de France
South Africa	5
France	19
27 July – Stade de France
Fiji	31
Australia	7

Gold medal match
27 July – Stade de France
France	28
Fiji	7
Bronze medal match
27 July – Stade de France
South Africa	26
Australia	19

== Women's competition ==
=== Group stage ===
==== Group A ====
Pos	Team	Pld	W	D	L	PF	PA	PD	Pts	Qualification
1	New Zealand	3	3	0	0	114	19	+95	9	Quarter-finals
2	Canada	3	2	0	1	50	64	−14	7	Quarter-finals
3	China	3	1	0	2	62	81	−19	5	Quarter-finals
4	Fiji	3	0	0	3	33	95	−62	3	

Source: World Rugby
Rules for classification: 1) Points; 2) Head-to-head result; 3) Point difference; 4) Points scored.

==== Group B ====
Pos	Team	Pld	W	D	L	PF	PA	PD	Pts	Qualification
1	Australia	3	3	0	0	89	24	+65	9	Quarter-finals
2	(United Kingdom) Great Britain	3	2	0	1	52	65	−13	7	Quarter-finals
3	(Republic of Ireland) Ireland	3	1	0	2	64	40	+24	5	Quarter-finals
4	South Africa	3	0	0	3	22	98	−76	3	

Source: World Rugby
Rules for classification: 1) Points; 2) Head-to-head result; 3) Point difference; 4) Points scored.

==== Group C ====
Pos	Team	Pld	W	D	L	PF	PA	PD	Pts	Qualification
1	France (H)	3	3	0	0	106	14	+92	9	Quarter-finals
2	United States	3	2	0	1	74	43	+31	7	Quarter-finals
3	Japan	3	1	0	2	46	97	−51	5	
4	Brazil	3	0	0	3	17	89	−72	3	

Source: World Rugby
Rules for classification: 1) Points; 2) Head-to-head result; 3) Point difference; 4) Points scored.
(H) Hosts

=== Knockout stage ===
==== Medal playoff ====
Quarter-finals
29 July – Stade de France
New Zealand	55
China	5
29 July – Stade de France
Great Britain	7
United States	17
29 July – Stade de France
France	14
Canada	19
29 July – Stade de France
Australia	40
Ireland	7

Semi-finals
30 July – Stade de France
New Zealand	24
United States	12
30 July – Stade de France
Canada	21
Australia	12

Gold medal match
30 July – Stade de France
New Zealand	19
Canada	12
Bronze medal match
30 July – Stade de France
United States	14
Australia	12

== See also ==
- Rugby sevens at the 2022 Asian Games
- Rugby sevens at the 2023 European Games
- Rugby sevens at the 2023 Pan American Games
- Rugby sevens at the 2023 Pacific Games
