= Rugby sevens at the 2024 Summer Olympics – Men's qualification =

Qualification for the men's rugby sevens tournament at the Paris 2024 Summer Olympics took place from November 2022 to June 2024, selecting twelve teams. All six World Rugby zones were to have a continental rugby sevens representative in the tournament. The host nation France reserved a direct quota place, with the remainder of the quota attributed to the eligible National Olympic Committee (NOCs) across three qualifying routes.

The top four teams from the 2022–23 World Rugby Sevens Series secured Paris 2024 spots for their respective NOC. Then, six further places were awarded to each of the six confederations (Africa, Asia, Europe, Oceania, North America, and South America) at their designated 2023 World Rugby Regional Association Olympic Qualification Tournaments. The remaining berth in the twelve-team field went to the winner of the 2024 Final Olympic Qualification Tournament, scheduled a month before the Games, held on 21–23 June 2024 at Stade Louis II in Monaco.

== Qualified teams ==
Qualification	Date	Host	Berths	Qualified team
Host nation	13 September 2017	—	1	France
2022–23 World Rugby Sevens Series	4 November 2022 – 21 May 2023	Various	4	New Zealand
2022–23 World Rugby Sevens Series	4 November 2022 – 21 May 2023	Various	4	Argentina
2022–23 World Rugby Sevens Series	4 November 2022 – 21 May 2023	Various	4	Fiji
2022–23 World Rugby Sevens Series	4 November 2022 – 21 May 2023	Various	4	Australia
2023 South American Qualification Tournament	17–18 June 2023	Montevideo	1	Uruguay
2023 European Games	25–27 June 2023	Kraków	1	Ireland
2023 RAN Sevens	19–20 August 2023	Langford	1	United States
2023 Africa Men's Sevens	16–17 September 2023	Harare	1	Kenya
2023 Oceania Sevens Championship	10–12 November 2023	Brisbane	1	Samoa
2023 Asian Qualification Tournament	18–19 November 2023	Osaka	1	Japan
2024 Final Olympic Qualification Tournament	21–23 June 2024	Fontvieille, Monaco	1	South Africa
Total			12	

== 2022–23 World Rugby Sevens Series ==
As a principal route for the tournament, the top four teams secured their spots for Paris 2024 based on the total points accrued throughout the eleven-tournament series.

2022–23 World Rugby Sevens – Men's Series XXIV
Pos	Event Team	Hong Kong I	Dubai	Cape Town	Hamilton	Sydney	Los Angeles	Vancouver	Hong Kong II	Singapore	Toulouse	London	Total points
1	New Zealand	8	17	19	19	22	22	13	22	22	22	14	200
2	Argentina	13	12	12	22	8	19	22	13	19	19	20	179
3	Fiji	19	8	13	10	17	17	10	19	17	8	18	156
4	France	17	13	8	15	15	8	19	17	10	17	12	151
5	Australia	22	10	7	13	10	15	17	5	13	13	8	133
6	Samoa	15	10	22	8	13	13	8	7	15	5	16	132
7	South Africa	10	22	15	10	19	10	3	12	5	10	4	120
8	Ireland	10	19	5	12	12	10	15	8	1	12	10	114
9	Great Britain	5	5	10	5	10	12	10	15	12	10	6	100
10	United States	12	15	17	17	5	3	12	10	3	1	3	98
11	Spain	5	3	5	3	2	7	5	10	8	7	2	57
12	Uruguay	3	7	10	1	3	5	5	5	10	5	0	54
13	Kenya	1	5	3	7	5	1	7	1	7	3	0	40
14	Canada	7	2	2	2	1	5	1	2	2	15	0	39
15	Japan	2	1	1	1	1	2	2	1	5	2	0	18
16	Tonga	—	—	—	5	7	—	—	—	—	—	0	12
17	Hong Kong	1	—	—	—	—	—	—	3	1	—	—	5
18	Chile	—	—	—	—	—	1	1	—	—	—	—	2
19	Uganda	—	1	1	—	—	—	—	—	—	—	—	2
20	Germany	—	—	—	—	—	—	—	—	—	1	—	1

Source: World Rugby at archive.today (archived 2023-05-23)

Legend
Qualification for the 2024 Olympic Sevens
Qualified as one of the four highest-placed eligible teams in the 2022–23 World Sevens Series
Automatically qualified (host country France)
Qualification for the 2023–24 World Sevens Series
Participated in the final round play-offs for core team status on the 2023–24 World Sevens Series
No colour	Core team and re-qualified as a core team for the 2023–24 World Sevens Series
Pink	Relegated from core team status for 2023–24
Yellow	Invited team

== 2023 Africa Men's Sevens ==
2023 Africa Men's Sevens took place from 16 to 17 September 2023 in Harare, Zimbabwe with the pre-qualifying meet staged in Mauritius on 24–25 June 2023, won by Algeria.

- Algeria
- Burkina Faso
- Ivory Coast
- Kenya
- Madagascar
- Namibia
- Nigeria
- South Africa
- Tunisia
- Uganda
- Zambia
- Zimbabwe

=== Pool stage ===
Pool A

Pos	Team	Pld	W	D	L	PF	PA	PD	Pts	Qualification
1	South Africa	3	3	0	0	120	14	+106	9	Quarter-finals
2	Madagascar	3	2	0	1	97	48	+49	7	Quarter-finals
3	Tunisia	3	1	0	2	38	91	−53	5	Possible quarter-finals
4	Ivory Coast	3	0	0	3	10	112	−102	3	

Rules for classification: 1) points; 2) head-to-head points; 3) head-to-head point difference; 4) head-to-head number of points scored; 5) point difference.

Pool B

Pos	Team	Pld	W	D	L	PF	PA	PD	Pts	Qualification
1	Kenya	3	3	0	0	122	22	+100	9	Quarter-finals
2	Zambia	3	2	0	1	81	62	+19	7	Quarter-finals
3	Nigeria	3	1	0	2	44	91	−47	5	Possible quarter-finals
4	Namibia	3	0	0	3	31	103	−72	3	

Rules for classification: 1) points; 2) head-to-head points; 3) head-to-head point difference; 4) head-to-head number of points scored; 5) point difference.

Pool C

Pos	Team	Pld	W	D	L	PF	PA	PD	Pts	Qualification
1	Zimbabwe	3	2	1	0	94	22	+72	8	Quarter-finals
2	Uganda	3	2	0	1	86	61	+25	7	Quarter-finals
3	Burkina Faso	3	1	1	1	72	55	+17	6	Possible quarter-finals
4	Algeria	3	0	0	3	19	133	−114	3	

Rules for classification: 1) points; 2) head-to-head points; 3) head-to-head point difference; 4) head-to-head number of points scored; 5) point difference.

Ranking of third-placed teams

The top two third-place teams joined the winners and runners-up in the quarter-finals.

Pos	Team	Pld	W	D	L	PF	PA	PD	Pts	Qualification
1	Burkina Faso	3	1	1	1	72	55	+17	6	Quarter-finals
2	Nigeria	3	1	0	2	44	91	−47	5	Quarter-finals
3	Tunisia	3	1	0	2	38	91	−53	5	

Rules for classification: 1) points; 2) point difference.

=== Knockout stage ===
Quarter-finals
17 September – Harare
Kenya	26
Burkina Faso	0
17 September – Harare
Zimbabwe	26
Madagascar	10
17 September – Harare
Zambia	15
Uganda	29
17 September – Harare
South Africa	27
Nigeria	0

Semi-finals
17 September – Harare
Kenya	33
Zimbabwe	10
17 September – Harare
Uganda	14
South Africa	26

Final
17 September – Harare
Kenya	17
South Africa	12
Third place
17 September – Harare
Zimbabwe	12
Uganda	24

=== Ranking ===
Rank	Team
1st place, gold medalist(s)	Kenya
2nd place, silver medalist(s)	South Africa
3rd place, bronze medalist(s)	Uganda
4	Zimbabwe
5	Zambia
6	Burkina Faso
7	Madagascar
8	Nigeria
9	Tunisia
10	Namibia
11	Algeria
12	Ivory Coast

Qualified for the 2024 Summer Olympics
Qualified for the Final Olympic Rugby Sevens Qualifier

== 2023 Asia Rugby Sevens Olympic Qualifying Tournament ==
The 2023 Asia Rugby Sevens Olympic Qualifying Tournament ran from 18 to 19 November 2023 at the Yodoko Sakura Stadium, Osaka, Japan.

=== Pool stage ===
Pool A

Pos	Team	Pld	W	D	L	PF	PA	PD	Pts	Qualification
1	Japan	3	2	0	1	98	21	+77	7	Semi-finals
2	China	3	2	0	1	81	50	+31	7	Semi-finals
3	South Korea	3	2	0	1	72	53	+19	7	
4	India	3	0	0	3	7	134	−127	3	

Rules for classification: 1) points; 2) head-to-head points; 3) head-to-head point difference; 4) head-to-head number of points scored; 5) point difference.

Pool B

Pos	Team	Pld	W	D	L	PF	PA	PD	Pts	Qualification
1	Hong Kong	3	3	0	0	129	0	+129	9	Semi-finals
2	United Arab Emirates	3	2	0	1	90	31	+59	7	Semi-finals
3	Thailand	3	1	0	2	17	107	−90	5	
4	Singapore	3	0	0	3	14	112	−98	3	

Rules for classification: 1) points; 2) head-to-head points; 3) head-to-head point difference; 4) head-to-head number of points scored; 5) point difference.

=== Knockout stage ===
Semi-finals
19 November – Osaka
Japan	21
United Arab Emirates	5
19 November – Osaka
Hong Kong	19
China	12

Final
19 November – Osaka
Japan	21
Hong Kong	14
Third place
19 November – Osaka
United Arab Emirates	0
China	36

=== Ranking ===
Rank	Team
1st place, gold medalist(s)	Japan
2nd place, silver medalist(s)	Hong Kong
3rd place, bronze medalist(s)	China
4	United Arab Emirates
5	South Korea
6	Thailand
7	India
8	Singapore

Qualified for the 2024 Summer Olympics
Qualified for the Final Olympic Rugby Sevens Qualifier

== 2023 European Games ==
The 2023 European Games in Kraków and Małopolska, Poland served as the European qualification tournament. Twelve teams competed with the winner securing the Paris 2024 ticket.

=== Qualified teams ===
Qualification	Date	Host	Berths	Qualified team
Host nation	—	—	1	Poland
2022–23 World Rugby Sevens Series	4 November 2022 – 21 May 2023	Various	3	Great Britain
2022–23 World Rugby Sevens Series	4 November 2022 – 21 May 2023	Various	3	Ireland
2022–23 World Rugby Sevens Series	4 November 2022 – 21 May 2023	Various	3	Spain
2022 Rugby Europe Sevens Championship Series	25 June – 3 July 2022	(Portugal) Lisbon (Poland) Kraków	7	Germany
2022 Rugby Europe Sevens Championship Series	25 June – 3 July 2022	(Portugal) Lisbon (Poland) Kraków	7	Belgium
2022 Rugby Europe Sevens Championship Series	25 June – 3 July 2022	(Portugal) Lisbon (Poland) Kraków	7	Italy
2022 Rugby Europe Sevens Championship Series	25 June – 3 July 2022	(Portugal) Lisbon (Poland) Kraków	7	Portugal
2022 Rugby Europe Sevens Championship Series	25 June – 3 July 2022	(Portugal) Lisbon (Poland) Kraków	7	Georgia
2022 Rugby Europe Sevens Championship Series	25 June – 3 July 2022	(Portugal) Lisbon (Poland) Kraków	7	Lithuania
2022 Rugby Europe Sevens Championship Series	25 June – 3 July 2022	(Portugal) Lisbon (Poland) Kraków	7	Czech Republic
2022 Rugby Europe Sevens Trophy	11–19 June 2022	(Croatia) Zagreb (Hungary) Budapest	1	Romania
			12	

=== Pool stage ===
Pool A

Pos	Team	Pld	W	D	L	PF	PA	PD	Pts	Qualification
1	Ireland	3	3	0	0	123	14	+109	9	Quarter-finals
2	Germany	3	1	1	1	73	38	+35	6	Quarter-finals
3	Italy	3	1	1	1	76	57	+19	6	Possible quarter-finals
4	Poland	3	0	0	3	0	163	−163	3	

Source: 2023 European Games
Rules for classification: 1) points; 2) head-to-head points; 3) head-to-head point difference; 4) head-to-head number of points scored; 5) point difference.

Pool B

Pos	Team	Pld	W	D	L	PF	PA	PD	Pts	Qualification
1	Spain	3	3	0	0	101	33	+68	9	Quarter-finals
2	Georgia	3	2	0	1	38	56	−18	7	Quarter-finals
3	Belgium	3	1	0	2	59	47	+12	5	Possible quarter-finals
4	Czech Republic	3	0	0	3	35	97	−62	3	

Source: 2023 European Games
Rules for classification: 1) points; 2) head-to-head points; 3) head-to-head point difference; 4) head-to-head number of points scored; 5) point difference.

Pool C

Pos	Team	Pld	W	D	L	PF	PA	PD	Pts	Qualification
1	Great Britain	3	3	0	0	100	5	+95	9	Quarter-finals
2	Portugal	3	2	0	1	88	50	+38	7	Quarter-finals
3	Lithuania	3	1	0	2	36	72	−36	5	Possible quarter-finals
4	Romania	3	0	0	3	17	114	−97	3	

Source: 2023 European Games
Rules for classification: 1) points; 2) head-to-head points; 3) head-to-head point difference; 4) head-to-head number of points scored; 5) point difference.

Ranking of third-placed teams

The top two third-place teams joined the winners and runners-up in the quarter-finals.

Pos	Team	Pld	W	D	L	PF	PA	PD	Pts	Qualification
1	Italy	3	1	1	1	76	57	+19	6	Quarter-finals
2	Belgium	3	1	0	2	59	47	+12	5	Quarter-finals
3	Lithuania	3	1	0	2	36	72	−36	5	

Source: 2023 European Games
Rules for classification: 1) points; 2) point difference.

=== Knockout stage ===
Quarter-finals
26 June – Kraków
Ireland	26
Belgium	12
26 June – Kraków
Georgia	5
Portugal	31
26 June – Kraków
Spain	36
Italy	7
26 June – Kraków
Great Britain	14
Germany	10

Semi-finals
27 June – Kraków
Ireland	24
Portugal	0
27 June – Kraków
Spain	7
Great Britain	19

Final
27 June – Kraków
Ireland	26
Great Britain	12
Third place
27 June – Kraków
Portugal	0
Spain	42

=== Ranking ===
Rank	Team
1st place, gold medalist(s)	Ireland
2nd place, silver medalist(s)	Great Britain
3rd place, bronze medalist(s)	Spain
4	Portugal
5	Belgium
6	Germany
7	Georgia
8	Italy
9	Lithuania
10	Czech Republic
11	Poland
12	Romania

Qualified for the 2024 Summer Olympics
Qualified for the Final Olympic Rugby Sevens Qualifier

== 2023 RAN Sevens ==
2023 RAN Sevens took place from 19 to 20 August 2023 in Langford, British Columbia, Canada.

=== Teams ===
The following teams will participate.

- Barbados
- Bermuda
- Canada
- Jamaica
- Mexico
- United States

=== Pool stage ===
Pool A

Pos	Team	Pld	W	D	L	PF	PA	PD	Pts	Qualification
1	United States	2	2	0	0	102	0	+102	6	Semi-finals
2	Mexico	2	1	0	1	35	47	−12	4	Quarter-finals
3	Bermuda	2	0	0	2	7	97	−90	2	Quarter-finals

Source: RAN Sevens Rugby Americas
Rules for classification: 1) points; 2) head-to-head points; 3) head-to-head point difference; 4) head-to-head number of points scored; 5) point difference.

Pool B

Pos	Team	Pld	W	D	L	PF	PA	PD	Pts	Qualification
1	Canada	2	2	0	0	59	12	+47	6	Semi-finals
2	Jamaica	2	1	0	1	41	21	+20	4	Quarter-finals
3	Barbados	2	0	0	2	0	67	−67	2	Quarter-finals

Source: RAN Sevens Rugby Americas
Rules for classification: 1) points; 2) head-to-head points; 3) head-to-head point difference; 4) head-to-head number of points scored; 5) point difference.

=== Knockout stage ===
Quarter-finals
20 August - Langford
Mexico	29
Barbados	5
20 August - Langford
Jamaica	45
Bermuda	0

Semi-finals
20 August - Langford
Canada	54
Mexico	5
20 August - Langford
United States	30
Jamaica	0

Final
20 August - Langford
Canada	14
United States	24
Third place
20 August - Langford
Mexico	10
Jamaica	7

=== Ranking ===
Rank	Team
1st place, gold medalist(s)	United States
2nd place, silver medalist(s)	Canada
3rd place, bronze medalist(s)	Mexico
4	Jamaica
5	Barbados
6	Bermuda

Qualified for the 2024 Summer Olympics
Qualified for the Final Olympic Rugby Sevens Qualifier

== 2023 Oceania Sevens Championship ==
The 2023 Oceania Sevens Championship ran from 10 to 12 November 2023 at Ballymore Stadium in Brisbane, Queensland, Australia.

The following teams competed for Olympic qualification:

- American Samoa
- Cook Islands
- Kiribati
- Nauru
- Papua New Guinea
- Samoa
- Solomon Islands
- Tonga
- Tuvalu
- Vanuatu

The following teams competed in the championships but had already claimed an Olympic berth:

- Australia
- Fiji
- New Zealand

The following team competed in the championships but was ineligible for an Olympic berth:

- Niue

=== Pool stage ===
Pool B (Olympic)

Pos	Team	Pld	W	D	L	PF	PA	PD	Pts	Qualification
1	Samoa	4	4	0	0	184	0	+184	12	Olympic qualifier final
2	Solomon Islands	4	3	0	1	105	74	+31	10	Fifth place match
3	Cook Islands	4	2	0	2	62	75	−13	8	
4	Tuvalu	4	1	0	3	48	96	−48	6	
5	American Samoa	4	0	0	4	12	166	−154	4	

Rules for classification: 1) points; 2) head-to-head points; 3) head-to-head point difference; 4) head-to-head number of points scored; 5) point difference.

Pool C (Olympic)

Pos	Team	Pld	W	D	L	PF	PA	PD	Pts	Qualification
1	Papua New Guinea	4	4	0	0	156	33	+123	12	Olympic qualifier final
2	Tonga	4	3	0	1	214	36	+178	10	Fifth place match
3	Vanuatu	4	2	0	2	43	136	−93	8	
4	Nauru	4	1	0	3	43	109	−66	6	
5	Kiribati	4	0	0	4	20	162	−142	4	

Rules for classification: 1) points; 2) head-to-head points; 3) head-to-head point difference; 4) head-to-head number of points scored; 5) point difference.

=== Olympic qualification play-offs ===
==== Fifth place match ====
12 November - Brisbane
Solomon Islands	5
Tonga	22

==== Olympic qualifier final ====
12 November - Brisbane
Samoa	24
Papua New Guinea	0

=== Ranking of teams competing for an Olympic berth ===
Rank	Team
1st place, gold medalist(s)	Samoa
2nd place, silver medalist(s)	Papua New Guinea
3rd place, bronze medalist(s)	Tonga
4	Solomon Islands
5	Cook Islands
6	Vanuatu
7	Tuvalu
8	Nauru
9	American Samoa
10	Kiribati

Qualified for the 2024 Summer Olympics
Qualified for the Final Olympic Rugby Sevens Qualifier

== 2023 South American Qualification Tournament ==
The 2023 South American Qualification Tournament, scheduled for 17–18 June 2023, was played in Montevideo, Uruguay. All nine countries with full World Rugby membership were invited to participate in both the men's and women's tournaments but only six of them acknowledged and confirmed their participation for the men's tournament.

=== Teams ===
- Brazil
- Chile
- Colombia
- Paraguay
- Peru
- Uruguay

=== Pool stage ===
Pos	Team	Pld	W	D	L	PF	PA	PD	Pts	Qualification
1	Uruguay	5	5	0	0	191	26	+165	15	Final
2	Chile	5	4	0	1	169	19	+150	13	Final
3	Brazil	5	3	0	2	142	75	+67	11	Third-place play-off
4	Colombia	5	2	0	3	50	159	−109	9	Third-place play-off
5	Paraguay	5	1	0	4	38	127	−89	7	
6	Peru	5	0	0	5	17	201	−184	5	

Source: Sudamérica Rugby
Rules for classification: 1) points; 2) head-to-head points; 3) head-to-head point difference; 4) head-to-head number of points scored; 5) point difference.

=== Knockout stage ===
==== Third-place play-off ====
Third-place play-off
18 June – 17:18 – Montevideo
Brazil (a.e.t.)	19
Colombia	14

==== Final ====
Final
18 June – 18:08 – Montevideo
Uruguay	12
Chile	5

=== Ranking ===
Rank	Team
1st place, gold medalist(s)	Uruguay
2nd place, silver medalist(s)	Chile
3rd place, bronze medalist(s)	Brazil
4	Colombia
5	Peru
6	Paraguay

Qualified for the 2024 Summer Olympics
Qualified for the Final Olympic Rugby Sevens Qualifier

== 2024 Final Olympic Qualifying Tournament ==
The 2024 Final Olympic Qualifying Tournament was scheduled for 21–23 June 2024 in Monaco. Two runners-up from each of the six continental confederations were eligible to participate in the tournament, with the winner earning the last remaining spot for Paris 2024.

=== Qualified teams ===
Qualification	Date	Host	Berths	Qualified team
2023 South American Qualification Tournament	17–18 June 2023	(Uruguay) Montevideo	2	Chile
2023 South American Qualification Tournament	17–18 June 2023	(Uruguay) Montevideo	2	Brazil
2023 European Games	25–27 June 2023	(Poland) Kraków	2	Great Britain
2023 European Games	25–27 June 2023	(Poland) Kraków	2	Spain
2023 RAN Sevens	19–20 August 2023	(Canada) Langford	2	Canada
2023 RAN Sevens	19–20 August 2023	(Canada) Langford	2	Mexico
2023 Africa Men's Sevens	16–17 September 2023	(Zimbabwe) Harare	2	South Africa
2023 Africa Men's Sevens	16–17 September 2023	(Zimbabwe) Harare	2	Uganda
2023 Oceania Sevens Championship	10–12 November 2023	(Australia) Brisbane	2	Papua New Guinea ~~Papua New Guinea~~ (Note: Papua New Guinea withdrew before the tournament due to not securing the necessary travel documentation to meet their pre-tournament arrival deadline.)
2023 Oceania Sevens Championship	10–12 November 2023	(Australia) Brisbane	2	Tonga
2023 Asian Qualification Tournament	18–19 November 2023	(Japan) Osaka	2	Hong Kong
2023 Asian Qualification Tournament	18–19 November 2023	(Japan) Osaka	2	China
Total			12	

- Notes:

=== Pool stage ===
Pool A

- All times are Central European Summer Time (UTC+02:00)

Team	Pld	W	L	PF	PA	PD	Pts
South Africa	3	3	0	101	14	+87	9
Chile	3	2	1	56	41	+15	7
Tonga	3	1	2	38	50	−12	5
Mexico	3	0	3	15	105	−90	3

21 June 2024
17:08

Chile	14–5	Tonga

Stade Louis II, Monaco

21 June 2024
17:32

South Africa	44–0	Mexico

Stade Louis II, Monaco

22 June 2024
13:20

Chile	35–10	Mexico

Stade Louis II, Monaco

22 June 2024
13:44

South Africa	31–7	Tonga

Stade Louis II, Monaco

22 June 2024
13:20

Tonga	26–5	Mexico

Stade Louis II, Monaco

22 June 2024
17:56

South Africa	26–7	Chile

Stade Louis II, Monaco

Pool B

Team	Pld	W	L	PF	PA	PD	Pts
Great Britain	3	3	0	81	36	+45	9
Canada	3	2	1	76	43	+33	7
Uganda	3	1	2	50	75	−25	5
China	3	0	3	48	101	−53	3

21 June 2024
15:04

Canada	31–12	Uganda

Stade Louis II, Monaco

21 June 2024
15:28

Great Britain	35–19	China

Stade Louis II, Monaco

22 June 2024
12:04

Canada	33–14	China

Stade Louis II, Monaco

22 June 2024
12:28

Great Britain	29–5	Uganda

Stade Louis II, Monaco

22 June 2024
15:52

Uganda	33–15	China

Stade Louis II, Monaco

22 June 2024
17:32

Great Britain	17–12	Canada

Stade Louis II, Monaco

Pool C

Team	Pld	W	L	PF	PA	PD	Pts
Spain	2	2	0	73	14	+59	6
Hong Kong	2	1	1	50	35	+15	4
Brazil	2	0	2	0	74	−74	2

21 June 2024
14:40

Spain	38–0	Brazil

Stade Louis II, Monaco

22 June 2024
11:40

Hong Kong	36–0	Brazil

Stade Louis II, Monaco

22 June 2024
15:28

Spain	35–14	Hong Kong

Stade Louis II, Monaco

=== Knockout stage ===
Quarterfinals
23 June 2024 – 11:31 – Stade Louis II
South Africa	26
Uganda	0
23 June 2024 – 12:43 – Stade Louis II
Canada	24
Chile	19
23 June 2024 – 11:55 – Stade Louis II
Great Britain	33
Tonga	0
23 June 2024 – 12:19 – Stade Louis II
Spain	26
Hong Kong	5

Semifinals
23 June 2024 – 15:10 – Stade Louis II
South Africa	28
Canada	0
23 June 2024 – 15:34 – Stade Louis II
Great Britain	17
Spain	12

Final
23 June 2024 – 18:36 – Stade Louis II
South Africa	14
Great Britain	5
3rd place final
23 June 2024 – 17:32 – Stade Louis II
Canada	14
Spain	31

=== Ranking ===
Legend
Qualified to 2024 Summer Olympics

Rank	Team
1	South Africa
2	Great Britain
3	Spain
4	Canada
5	Chile
5	Hong Kong
5	Uganda
5	Tonga
9	Brazil
9	China
9	Mexico

== See also ==
- Rugby sevens at the 2024 Summer Olympics
