= Rugby sevens at the 2023 Pan American Games – Women's tournament =

Women's rugby sevens at the XVIV Pan American Games
- Host nation: Chile

Cup
- Champion: United States
- Runner-up: Canada
- Third: Brazil

Tournament details
- Matches played: 20
- Tries scored: 133 (average 6.65 per match)
- Most points: (Canada) Asia Hogan-Rochester (43)
- Most tries: 1 player

The rugby sevens women's tournament at the 2023 Pan American Games in Santiago, Chile was held on 3–4 November 2023, with eight teams participating at the sports center in Estadio Municipal de La Pintana.

This is the third appearance of the women's tournament of Rugby sevens at the Pan American Games. United States won its first title.

== Qualification ==
Eight women's teams qualified to compete in the tournament games. Two World Sevens Series core teams (Canada and United States) qualified automatically, along with five other teams in various qualifying tournaments.

=== Summary ===
Event	Dates	Location	Quota(s)	Qualified
Host Nation	—N/a	—N/a	1	Chile
Automatic qualification	—N/a	—N/a	2	Canada; United States
2022 Sudamérica Rugby Sevens	10–11 June	(Brazil) Saquarema	1	Brazil
2022 South American Games	7–9 October	(Paraguay) Asunción	2	Paraguay; Colombia
2022 RAN Super Sevens	11–13 November	Mexico City	2	Mexico; Jamaica
Total			8	

== Results ==
All times are in Chile Time (UTC−4).

=== Pool stage ===
==== Pool A ====
Pos	Team	Pld	W	D	L	PF	PA	PD	Pts	Qualification
1	United States	3	3	0	0	116	0	+116	9	Semifinals
2	Colombia	3	2	0	1	58	54	+4	7	Semifinals
3	Jamaica	3	1	0	2	38	91	−53	5	5–8th place semifinals
4	Paraguay	3	0	0	3	28	95	−67	3	5–8th place semifinals

Source: Santiago 2023
Rules for classification: 1) Points; 2) Head-to-head result; 3) Point difference; 4) Points scored; 5) draw.

3 November 2023
10:00

United States	44–0	Jamaica
Try: Tapper (2) 1', 3'; Sedrick 2'; Olsen 4'; Sullivan (3) 2', 6', 7'; Ramsey 4'; Con: Heavirland (2/7) 6'	Report

Estadio Municipal de La Pintana
Referee: Nerea Livoni (Argentina)

3 November 2023
10:25

Paraguay	7–32	Colombia
Try: Cristaldo 8'; Con: Benitez 8'	Report	Try: Arzuaga (2) 3', 7'; Soto 6'; Orobio 2'; Mejía 4'; Ríos 6'; Con: Pacheco (1/2) 6'

Estadio Municipal de La Pintana
Referee: Kristine Lovatt (Canada)

3 November 2023
15:00

United States	33–0	Colombia
Try: Empa 1'; Tapper (2) 5', 2'; Heavirland 6'; Sullivan 8'; Con: Heavirland (3/3) 6', 6', 8'; Olsen (1/1) 2'	Report

Estadio Municipal de La Pintana
Referee: Frank Méndez (Chile)

3 November 2023
15:25

Jamaica	24–21	Paraguay
Try: Rampton 3'; Dodd (2) 5', 4'; Blair 6'; Con: Rampton (2/4) 5', 4'	Report	Try: Cristaldo (2) 0', 6'; Romero 0'; Con: Viveros (3/3) 0', 0', 6'

Estadio Municipal de La Pintana
Referee: Francisco Lopez (United States)

3 November 2023
18:20

United States	39–0	Paraguay
Try: Rovetti 0'; Ramsey (3) 2', 1', 4'; Sullivan 3'; Tapper 2'; Sedrick 6'; Con: Sedrick (1/1) 1'; Heavirland (1/3) 6'	Report

Estadio Municipal de La Pintana
Referee: Kristine Lovatt (Canada)

3 November 2023
18:45

Colombia	26–14	Jamaica
Try: Tapias 3'; Soto 5'; Mestra 3'; Ríos 6'; Con: Pacheco (2/2) 4', 5'; Lopera (1/1) 4'	Report	Try: Dodd (2) 0', 2'; Con: Rampton (2/2) 0', 2'

Estadio Municipal de La Pintana
Referee: Nerea Livoni (Argentina)

==== Pool B ====
Pos	Team	Pld	W	D	L	PF	PA	PD	Pts	Qualification
1	Canada	3	3	0	0	134	21	+113	9	Semifinals
2	Brazil	3	2	0	1	109	29	+80	7	Semifinals
3	Chile	3	1	0	2	27	82	−55	5	5–8th place semifinals
4	Mexico	3	0	0	3	5	143	−138	3	5–8th place semifinals

Source: Santiago 2023
Rules for classification: 1) Points; 2) Head-to-head result; 3) Point difference; 4) Points scored; 5) draw.

3 November 2023
10:50

Brazil	47–0	Mexico
Try: Furtado (4) 1', 4', 1', 7'; Costa 2'; Zanellato 7'; Soares 4'; Con: Campos (3/3) 1', 4', 7'; Nicolau (2/2) 2', 4'; Lima (1/1) 1'	Report

Estadio Municipal de La Pintana
Referee: Gonzalo de Achaval (Argentina)

3 November 2023
11:15

Canada	36–0	Chile
Try: Logan (2) 2', 0'; De Couvreur 7'; Williams 2'; Daniels 4'; Valenzuela 5'; Con: Hogan-Rochester (3/3) 3', 7', 0'	Report

Estadio Municipal de La Pintana
Referee: Francisco Lopez (United States)

3 November 2023
15:50

Canada	69–0	Mexico
Try: Carissa Norsten 0'; Hogan-Rochester (2) 2', 1'; Logan 5'; Williams (2) 6', 8'; Romeo (2) 0', 3'; Nicholas 4'; Valenzuela 6'; Con: Hogan-Rochester (6/8) 0', 2', 5', 6', 1', 3'; Nicholas (1/1) 6'	Report

Estadio Municipal de La Pintana
Referee: Nerea Livoni (Argentina)

3 November 2023
16:15

Chile	0–41	Brazil
	Report	Try: Costa 1'; Silva 4'; Gomes 5'; Nicolau 7'; Lima (3) 2', 4', 6'; Con: Campos (2/4) 1', 4'; Nicolau (1/2) 2'

Estadio Municipal de La Pintana
Referee: Kristine Lovatt (Canada)

3 November 2023
19:10

Canada	29–21	Brazil
Try: Norsten 0'; Logan 5'; Williams (2) 2', 4'; Romeo 6'; Con: Hogan-Rochester (2/3) 5', 3'	Report	Try: Nicolau 3'; Campos 6'; Silva 1'; Con: Nicolau (3/3) 4', 7', 1'

Estadio Municipal de La Pintana
Referee: Frank Méndez (Chile)

3 November 2023
19:35

Mexico	5–27	Chile
Try: González 3'	Report	Try: A. Badilla 5'; Rojas (2) 0', 5'; Araneda 2'; N. Badilla 6'; Con: A. Badilla (1/4) 7'

Estadio Municipal de La Pintana
Referee: Francisco Lopez (United States)

=== Classification round ===
Semi-finals
4 November — 10:00 — Santiago
Paraguay	14
Chile	10
4 November — 10:25 — Santiago
Jamaica	14
Mexico	19

Fifth Place
4 November — 15:25 — Santiago
Mexico	12
Paraguay	26
Seventh Place
4 November — 15:00 — Santiago
Jamaica	5
Chile	34

==== 5–8th place semifinals ====
4 November 2023
10:00

Paraguay	14–10	Chile
Try: Viveros 1'; Con: Viveros (2/2) 1', 4'	Report	Try: N. Badilla 1'; Villarroel 8'

Estadio Municipal de La Pintana
Referee: Kristine Lovatt (Canada)

4 November 2023
10:25

Jamaica	14–19	Mexico
Try: Walker 0'; Dodd 5'; Con: Rampton (2/2) 1'	Report	Try: Tuyu 6'; Bender 4'; Con: Bender (1/2) 7'

Estadio Municipal de La Pintana
Referee: Nerea Livoni (Argentina)

==== Seventh place match ====
4 November 2023
15:00

Jamaica	5–24	Chile
Try: Blair 2'	Report	Try: Villarroel 2'; Ogalde 5'; Miranda (2) 7', 3'; Araneda 6'; Baeza 7'; Con: Rojas (1/2) 8'

Estadio Municipal de La Pintana
Referee: Fernando García (Mexico)

==== Fifth place match ====
4 November 2023
15:25

Mexico	12–26	Paraguay
Try: Bender 2'; González 2'; Con: Bender (1/1) 2'	Report	Try: Cristaldo (2) 4', 0'; Alfonso 5'; Romero 4'; Con: Viveros (3/4) 4', 0', 5'

Estadio Municipal de La Pintana
Referee: Talal-Azmat Chaudhry (Canada)

=== Medal round ===
Semi-finals
4 November — 11:40 — Santiago
Colombia	14
Canada	45
4 November — 12:05 — Santiago
United States	36
Brazil	0

Final
4 November — 17:40 — Santiago
United States	19
Canada	12
Third Place
4 November — 16:40 — Santiago
Brazil	45
Colombia	0

==== Semifinals ====
4 November 2023
11:40

Colombia	14–45	Canada
Try: Durango 5'; Cordoba 5'; Con: Lopera (1/1) 5'; Pacheco (1/1) 5'	Report	Try: Norsten 1'; Corrigan (2) 3'; Logan (2) 6', 1'; Hogan-Rochester 7'; Nicholas 3'; Corrigan 6'; Con: Hogan-Rochester (3/4) 1', 3', 7'; Williams (1/1) 2'; Nicholas (1/2) 4'

Estadio Municipal de La Pintana
Referee: Frank Méndez (Chile)

4 November 2023
12:05

United States	36–0	Brazil
Try: Sedrick 1'; Kirshe 3'; Maker 5'; Rovetti 4'; Sullivan 7'; Con: Olsen (2/4) 1', 5'; Heavirland (1/2) 7'	Report

Estadio Municipal de La Pintana
Referee: Talal-Ahmat Chaudhry (Canada)

==== Bronze medal match ====
4 November 2023
16:40

Brazil	45–0	Colombia
Try: Costa (3) 1', 4', 8'; Zanellato 6'; Lima 1'; Soares 4'; Alves 6'; Con: Campos (3/4) 2', 4', 8'; Nicolau (2/3) 6', 4'	Report

Estadio Municipal de La Pintana
Referee: Kristine Lovatt (Canada)

==== Gold medal match ====
4 November 2023
17:40

United States	19–12	Canada
Try: Kirshe 9'; Sedrick 4'; Tapper 6'; Con: Olsen (2/3) 10', 5'	Report	Try: Logan (2) 3', 0'; Con: Williams (1/1) 1'

Estadio Municipal de La Pintana
Referee: Nerea Livoni (Argentina)

== Final ranking ==
Rank	Team
1st place, gold medalist(s)	United States
2nd place, silver medalist(s)	Canada
3rd place, bronze medalist(s)	Brazil
4	Colombia
5	Paraguay
6	Mexico
7	Chile
8	Jamaica

2023 Pan American Games winners

United States
1st title
