= Alex Sedrick =

American rugby union player (born 1998)

- Born: Alexandria Marie Sedrick; February 28, 1998 (age 28); Salt Lake City, Utah, U.S.
- Education: Life University
- Height: 5 ft 3 in (160 cm)
- Weight: 137 lb (62 kg)

Rugby union career
- Position: Center
International career
Years	Team	Apps	(Points)
2021	United States	19	
Medal record
Women's rugby sevens
Representing United States
Olympic Games
Bronze medal – third place	2024 Paris	Team competition
Pan American Games
Gold medal – first place	2023 Santiago	Team competition

Alexandria "Spiff" Marie Sedrick (born February 28, 1998), is an American rugby union player who plays as a center. She made her debut for the sevens team in 2021, and competed for the United States in rugby sevens at the 2024 Summer Olympics in Paris, where the Eagles took home a bronze medal. She also won a gold medal at the 2023 Pan American Games.

Sedrick plays for the American professional women's Sevens league – Premier Rugby Sevens where she won the United Championship in 2023 with the Rocky Mountain Experts. Sedrick has been playing with PR7s since its inaugural season in 2021.

== Early life ==
Alexandria Marie Sedrick was born on February 28, 1998 in Salt Lake City, Utah. She is of Samoan descent. Sedrick was a multi-sport athlete who attended Herriman High School.

== Rugby career ==
=== College career ===
Sedrick played collegiate rugby at Life University. During her time with the Running Eagles, she won several awards, including the MA Sorensen Award.

=== National Sevens career ===
Sedrick made her international debut at the 2021 Dubai Women's Sevens. In 2022, she was also selected in the United States team for the Rugby World Cup Sevens in Cape Town. They lost to France in the bronze medal final and finished fourth overall. Several months later, her team finished in third place in the South Africa Sevens and automatically qualified for the 2024 Olympics in Paris. In the bronze medal game, she would score the game winning-try and conversion against Australia, after breaking two tackles and running nearly the length of the field as the clock expired.

=== Professional Sevens Career ===
==== Premier Rugby Sevens ====
Sedrick joined the American professional Sevens league – Premier Rugby Sevens during its inaugural season in 2021. Sedrick has played for two teams within PR7s, earning herself two championships. In 2021, Sedrick won the Women's Championship with the Northern Loonies while in 2023 she won the United Championship with the Rocky Mountain Experts.

2021

Sedrick played in all four matches with the Northern Loonies aiding the team to the first-ever PR7s Championship title. Sedrick did not score in these matches, but she did assist three tires and played an incredible support role on the field.

2022

Sedrick returned to PR7s and suited up for the second consecutive season with the Northern Loonies. PR7s moved to a tour-based model where she played in the three tournaments in San Jose, Washington D.C. and Austin. The Loonies fell short this season not being able to repeat as Champions.

2023

Sedrick was traded to the Rocky Mountain Experts where she played alongside USA Rugby teammate in Ariana Ramsey.

Sedrick played in two regular season tournaments in TCO Stadium in Minneapolis, Minn. and PayPal Park in San Jose, Calif. and advanced to play the Championship in Washington D.C. at Audi Field.

She totaled 16 tackles this season and aided the team to a United Championship which is the award given to the franchise with the most points between the men's and women's team. The Experts finished third in the league after defeating the Southern Headliners in the third-place match.
