= 2024 Men's Rugby Sevens Final Olympic Qualification Tournament =

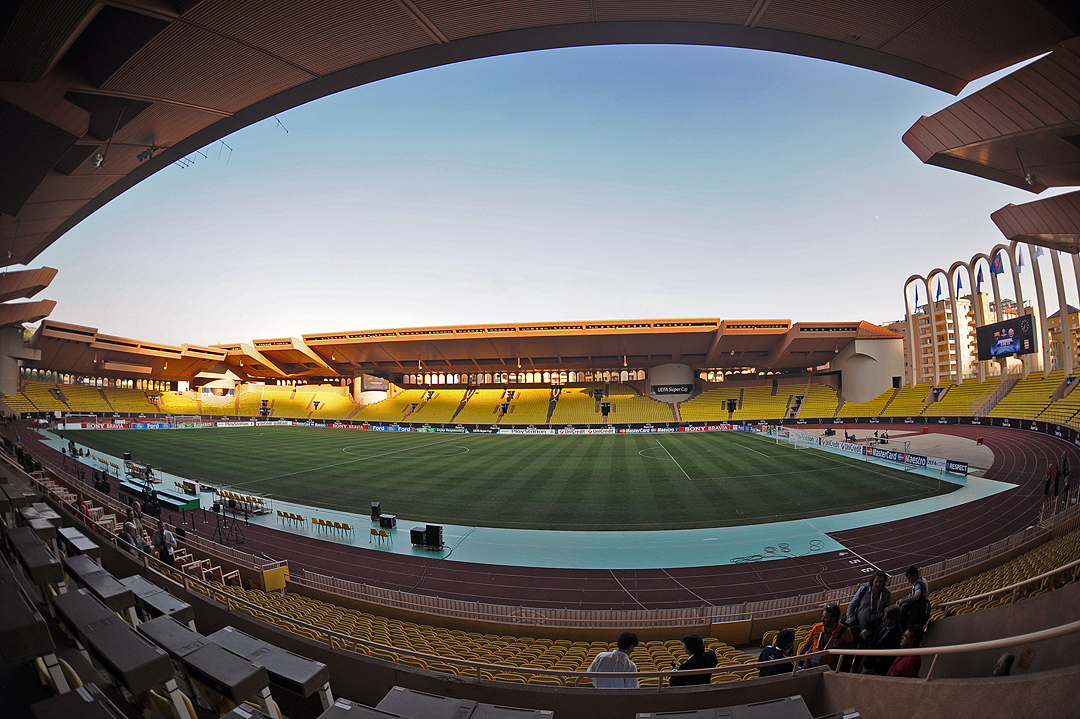
- The tournament venue, Stade Louis II.
- Hosts: Monaco
- Date: 21–23 June 2024
- Nations: 11

Final positions
- Champions: South Africa
- Runners-up: Great Britain

The final qualification repechage tournament for men's rugby sevens at the 2024 Summer Olympics was held on 21–23 June 2024 at Stade Louis II in Monaco.

Twelve men's teams were eligible to compete in the repechage tournament, being the second and third ranked teams from the six continental qualifiers.

== Teams ==
Event	Dates	Location	Quota	Qualifier
2023 South American Qualification Tournament	17–18 June 2023	(Uruguay) Montevideo	2	Chile
2023 South American Qualification Tournament	17–18 June 2023	(Uruguay) Montevideo	2	Brazil
2023 European Games	25–27 June 2023	(Poland) Kraków	2	Great Britain
2023 European Games	25–27 June 2023	(Poland) Kraków	2	Spain
2023 RAN Sevens	19–20 August 2023	(Canada) Langford	2	Canada
2023 RAN Sevens	19–20 August 2023	(Canada) Langford	2	Mexico
2023 Africa Men's Sevens	16–17 September 2023	(Zimbabwe) Harare	2	South Africa
2023 Africa Men's Sevens	16–17 September 2023	(Zimbabwe) Harare	2	Uganda
2023 Oceania Sevens Championship	10–12 November 2023	(Australia) Brisbane	2	~~Papua New Guinea~~ (Note: Papua New Guinea withdrew before the tournament due to not securing the necessary travel documentation to meet their pre-tournament arrival deadline.)
2023 Oceania Sevens Championship	10–12 November 2023	(Australia) Brisbane	2	Tonga
2023 Asian Qualification Tournament	18–19 November 2023	(Japan) Osaka	2	Hong Kong
2023 Asian Qualification Tournament	18–19 November 2023	(Japan) Osaka	2	China
Total			12	

- Notes:

== Pool stage ==
=== Pool A ===
- All times are Central European Summer Time (UTC+02:00)

Team	Pld	W	L	PF	PA	PD	Pts
South Africa	3	3	0	101	14	+87	9
Chile	3	2	1	56	41	+15	7
Tonga	3	1	2	38	50	−12	5
Mexico	3	0	3	15	105	−90	3

21 June 2024
17:08

Chile	14–5	Tonga

Stade Louis II, Monaco

21 June 2024
17:32

South Africa	44–0	Mexico

Stade Louis II, Monaco

22 June 2024
13:20

Chile	35–10	Mexico

Stade Louis II, Monaco

22 June 2024
13:44

South Africa	31–7	Tonga

Stade Louis II, Monaco

22 June 2024
13:20

Tonga	26–5	Mexico

Stade Louis II, Monaco

22 June 2024
17:56

South Africa	26–7	Chile

Stade Louis II, Monaco

=== Pool B ===
Team	Pld	W	L	PF	PA	PD	Pts
Great Britain	3	3	0	81	36	+45	9
Canada	3	2	1	76	43	+33	7
Uganda	3	1	2	50	75	−25	5
China	3	0	3	48	101	−53	3

21 June 2024
15:04

Canada	31–12	Uganda

Stade Louis II, Monaco

21 June 2024
15:28

Great Britain	35–19	China

Stade Louis II, Monaco

22 June 2024
12:04

Canada	33–14	China

Stade Louis II, Monaco

22 June 2024
12:28

Great Britain	29–5	Uganda

Stade Louis II, Monaco

22 June 2024
15:52

Uganda	33–15	China

Stade Louis II, Monaco

22 June 2024
17:32

Great Britain	17–12	Canada

Stade Louis II, Monaco

=== Pool C ===
Team	Pld	W	L	PF	PA	PD	Pts
Spain	2	2	0	73	14	+59	6
Hong Kong	2	1	1	50	35	+15	4
Brazil	2	0	2	0	74	−74	2

21 June 2024
14:40

Spain	38–0	Brazil

Stade Louis II, Monaco

22 June 2024
11:40

Hong Kong	36–0	Brazil

Stade Louis II, Monaco

22 June 2024
15:28

Spain	35–14	Hong Kong

Stade Louis II, Monaco

== Combined standings ==
The top two teams from each pool, plus the two best third-placed teams on the combined pool standings progressed to the knockout stage. The seedings were based on (a) highest pool placing, then (b) most competition points awarded (for a win, draw or loss) in the respective pool standings, and (c) greatest difference between points scored and conceded across all pool matches played.

#	Team	Place	Pld	−/+	Pts
1	South Africa	1st A	3	+87	9
2	Great Britain	1st B	3	+45	9
3	Spain	1st C	2	+59	6
4	Canada	2nd B	3	+33	7
5	Chile	2nd A	3	+15	7
6	Hong Kong	2nd C	2	+15	4
7	Tonga	3rd A	3	−12	5
8	Uganda	3rd B	3	−25	5
9	Brazil	3rd C	2	−74	2
10	China	4th B	3	−53	3
11	Mexico	4th A	3	−90	3

Key
Quarter-finalists
1st placed in pool
2nd placed in pool
Two best 3rd placed

== Knockout stage ==
=== 1st place ===
Quarterfinals
23 June 2024 – 11:31 – Stade Louis II
South Africa	26
Uganda	0
23 June 2024 – 12:43 – Stade Louis II
Canada	24
Chile	19
23 June 2024 – 11:55 – Stade Louis II
Great Britain	33
Tonga	0
23 June 2024 – 12:19 – Stade Louis II
Spain	26
Hong Kong	5

Semifinals
23 June 2024 – 15:10 – Stade Louis II
South Africa	28
Canada	0
23 June 2024 – 15:34 – Stade Louis II
Great Britain	17
Spain	12

Final
23 June 2024 – 18:36 – Stade Louis II
South Africa	14
Great Britain	5
3rd place final
23 June 2024 – 17:32 – Stade Louis II
Canada	14
Spain	31

== Placings ==
Legend
Qualified for 2024 Summer Olympics

Rank	Team
1	South Africa
2	Great Britain
3	Spain
4	Canada
5	Chile
5	Hong Kong
5	Uganda
5	Tonga
9	Brazil
9	China
9	Mexico

== See also ==
- 2024 Women's Rugby Sevens Final Olympic Qualification Tournament
