= 2024 Women's Rugby Sevens Final Olympic Qualification Tournament =

Rugby tournament in Monaco

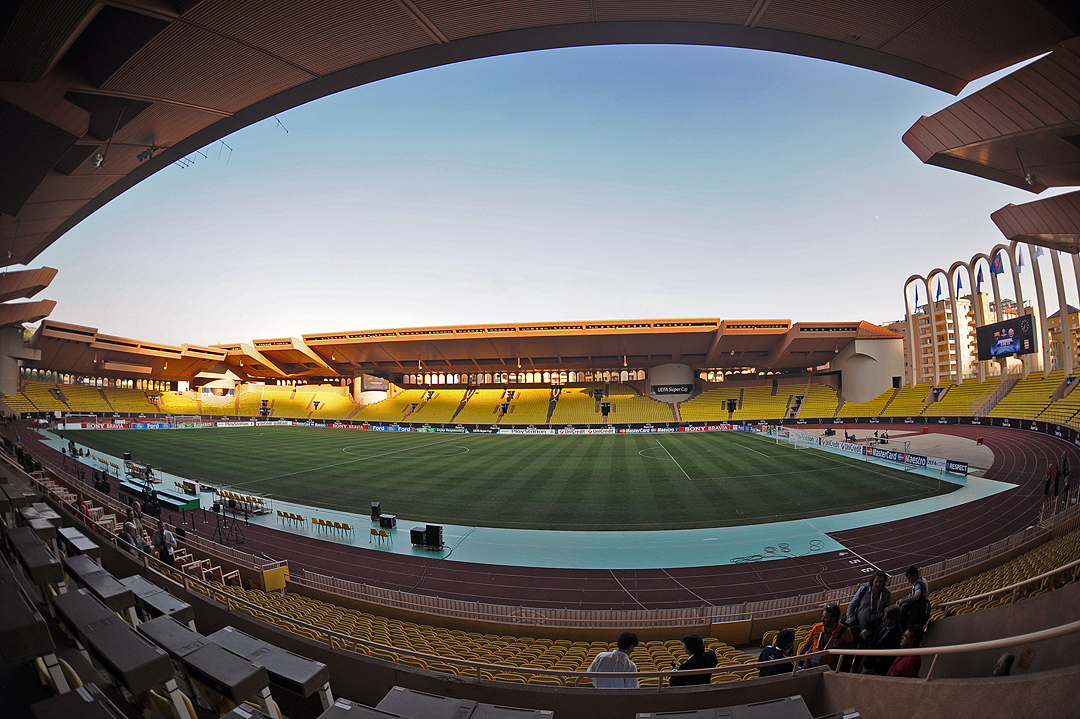
- The tournament venue, Stade Louis II.
- Hosts: Monaco
- Date: 21–23 June 2024
- Nations: 11

Final positions
- Champions: China
- Runners-up: Kenya

The final qualification repechage tournament for women's rugby sevens at the 2024 Summer Olympics was held on 21–23 June 2024 at Stade Louis II in Monaco.

Twelve women's teams were eligible to compete in the repechage tournament, being the second and third ranked teams from the six continental qualifiers.

== Teams ==
Event	Dates	Location	Quota	Qualifier
2023 South American Qualification Tournament	17–18 June 2023	(Uruguay) Montevideo	2	Argentina
2023 South American Qualification Tournament	17–18 June 2023	(Uruguay) Montevideo	2	Paraguay
2023 European Games	25–27 June 2023	(Poland) Kraków	2	Poland
2023 European Games	25–27 June 2023	(Poland) Kraków	2	Czech Republic
2023 RAN Women's Sevens	19–20 August 2023	(Canada) Langford	2	Mexico
2023 RAN Women's Sevens	19–20 August 2023	(Canada) Langford	2	Jamaica
2023 Africa Women's Sevens	14–15 October 2023	(Tunisia) Monastir	2	Kenya
2023 Africa Women's Sevens	14–15 October 2023	(Tunisia) Monastir	2	Uganda
2023 Oceania Women's Sevens Championship	10–12 November 2023	(Australia) Brisbane	2	~~Papua New Guinea~~ (Note: Papua New Guinea withdrew before the tournament due to not securing the necessary travel documentation to meet their pre-tournament arrival deadline.)
2023 Oceania Women's Sevens Championship	10–12 November 2023	(Australia) Brisbane	2	Samoa
2023 Asian Qualification Tournament	18–19 November 2023	(Japan) Osaka	2	China
2023 Asian Qualification Tournament	18–19 November 2023	(Japan) Osaka	2	Hong Kong
Total			12	

- Notes:

== Pool stage ==
=== Pool D ===
Team	Pld	W	L	PF	PA	PD	Pts
Kenya	2	2	0	50	22	+28	6
Argentina	2	1	1	43	24	+19	4
Samoa	2	0	2	10	57	−47	2

21 June 2024
15:56

Argentina	26–5	Samoa

Stade Louis II, Monaco

22 June 2024
12:56

Kenya	31–5	Samoa

Stade Louis II, Monaco

22 June 2024
17:08

Argentina	17–19	Kenya

Stade Louis II, Monaco

=== Pool E ===
Team	Pld	W	L	PF	PA	PD	Pts
Uganda	3	3	0	70	14	+56	9
Hong Kong	3	2	1	69	44	+25	7
Paraguay	3	1	2	51	78	−27	5
Jamaica	3	0	3	33	87	−54	3

21 June 2024
13:48

Hong Kong	33–15	Paraguay

Stade Louis II, Monaco

21 June 2024
14:12

Uganda	29–0	Jamaica

Stade Louis II, Monaco

22 June 2024
10:48

Hong Kong	22–12	Jamaica

Stade Louis II, Monaco

22 June 2024
11:12

Uganda	24–0	Paraguay

Stade Louis II, Monaco

22 June 2024
15:00

Paraguay	36–21	Jamaica

Stade Louis II, Monaco

22 June 2024
16:44

Uganda	17–14	Hong Kong

Stade Louis II, Monaco

=== Pool F ===
Team	Pld	W	L	PF	PA	PD	Pts
China	3	3	0	122	5	+117	9
Poland	3	2	1	84	33	+51	7
Czech Republic	3	1	2	57	65	−8	5
Mexico	3	0	3	0	160	−160	3

21 June 2024
13:00

Poland	24–7	Czech Republic

Stade Louis II, Monaco

21 June 2024
13:24

China	55–0	Mexico

Stade Louis II, Monaco

22 June 2024
10:00

Poland	60–0	Mexico

Stade Louis II, Monaco

22 June 2024
10:24

China	41–5	Czech Republic

Stade Louis II, Monaco

22 June 2024
14:12

Czech Republic	45–0	Mexico

Stade Louis II, Monaco

22 June 2024
14:36

China	26–0	Poland

Stade Louis II, Monaco

== Combined standings ==
The top two teams from each pool, plus the two best third-placed teams on the combined pool standings progressed to the knockout stage. The seedings were based on (a) highest pool placing, then (b) most competition points awarded (for a win, draw or loss) in the respective pool standings, and (c) greatest difference between points scored and conceded across all pool matches played.

#	Team	Place	Pld	−/+	Pts
1	China	1st F	3	+117	9
2	Uganda	1st E	3	+56	9
3	Kenya	1st D	2	+28	6
4	Poland	2nd F	3	+51	7
5	Hong Kong	2nd E	3	+25	7
6	Argentina	2nd D	2	+19	4
7	Czech Republic	3rd F	3	−8	4
8	Paraguay	3rd E	3	−27	4
9	Samoa	3rd D	2	−47	2
10	Jamaica	4th E	3	−54	3
11	Mexico	4th F	3	−160	3

Key
Quarter-finalists
1st placed in pool
2nd placed in pool
Two best 3rd placed

== Knockout stage ==
=== Cup ===
Quarterfinals
23 June 2024 – 09:30 – Stade Louis II
China	31
Paraguay	0
23 June 2024 – 10:42 – Stade Louis II
Poland	36
Hong Kong	0
23 June 2024 – 09:54 – Stade Louis II
Uganda	0
Czech Republic	22
23 June 2024 – 10:18 – Stade Louis II
Kenya	15
Argentina	12

Semifinals
23 June 2024 – 14:22 – Stade Louis II
China	40
Poland	7
23 June 2024 – 14:46 – Stade Louis II
Czech Republic	10
Kenya	12

Final
23 June 2024 – 18:01 – Stade Louis II
China	24
Kenya	7
3rd place final
23 June 2024 – 17:08 – Stade Louis II
Poland	33
Czech Republic	14

== Placings ==
Legend
Qualified for 2024 Summer Olympics

Rank	Team
1	China
2	Kenya
3	Poland
4	Czech Republic
5	Uganda
5	Argentina
5	Hong Kong
5	Paraguay
9	Samoa
9	Jamaica
9	Mexico

== See also ==
- 2024 Men's Rugby Sevens Final Olympic Qualification Tournament
