= Shalaya Valenzuela =

Canadian rugby union and sevens player

- Born: 12 June 1999 (age 27) Abbotsford, British Columbia
- Height: 167 cm (5 ft 6 in)
- Weight: 65 kg (143 lb)

Rugby union career
- Position: Inside centre
Amateur team(s)
Years	Team	Apps	(Points)
- UFV Cascades
- Victoria Vikes
Senior career
Years	Team	Apps	(Points)
- Abbotsford RFC
National sevens team
Years	Team		Comps
2022–	Canada		
Medal record
Women's rugby sevens
Representing Canada
Olympic Games
Silver medal – second place	2024 Paris	Team competition
Pan American Games
Silver medal – second place	2023 Santiago	Team competition

Shalaya Valenzuela (born 12 June 1999) is a Canadian rugby union player who competes for the Canada women's national rugby sevens team. She won a silver medal at the 2024 Summer Olympics.

== Biography ==
Valenzuela was born on 12 June 1999, in Abbotsford, British Columbia. She is a member of the Tseshaht First Nation and spent time in foster care as a child. She grew up playing rugby union as an inside centre, being a member of the club Abbotsford RFC, and attended Yale Secondary School, where she played for the Yale Lions. While at Yale, she received the Premier's Award for Indigenous Excellence in Sport. She graduated from the school in 2017.

Valenzuela was a member of the BC Bears U23 team and the national junior team, both of which she represented at international competitions. After Yale, she attended the University of the Fraser Valley in Abbotsford, where she competed in U Sports for the UFV Cascades, and later transferred to the University of Victoria, where she played for the Victoria Vikes.

Valenzuela spent two years in the Rugby Canada Maple Leaf Academy before being called up to the Canada women's national rugby sevens team for the first time in December 2022, for the World Sevens Series in Dubai. She became the only indigenous athlete on the national team. In 2023, she played for the team at the Pan American Games and helped them win a silver medal, losing to the United States in the final. In 2024, she was named an alternate for the team at the 2024 Summer Olympics. She was promoted to the active squad following an injury to Keyara Wardley, participating in their match against France. Canada ultimately won the silver medal, losing to New Zealand in the finals, with Valenzuela becoming the first indigenous woman to win a medal in rugby sevens for the country.
