= Ariana Ramsey =

American rugby union player (born 2000)

Ariana Ramsey OLY
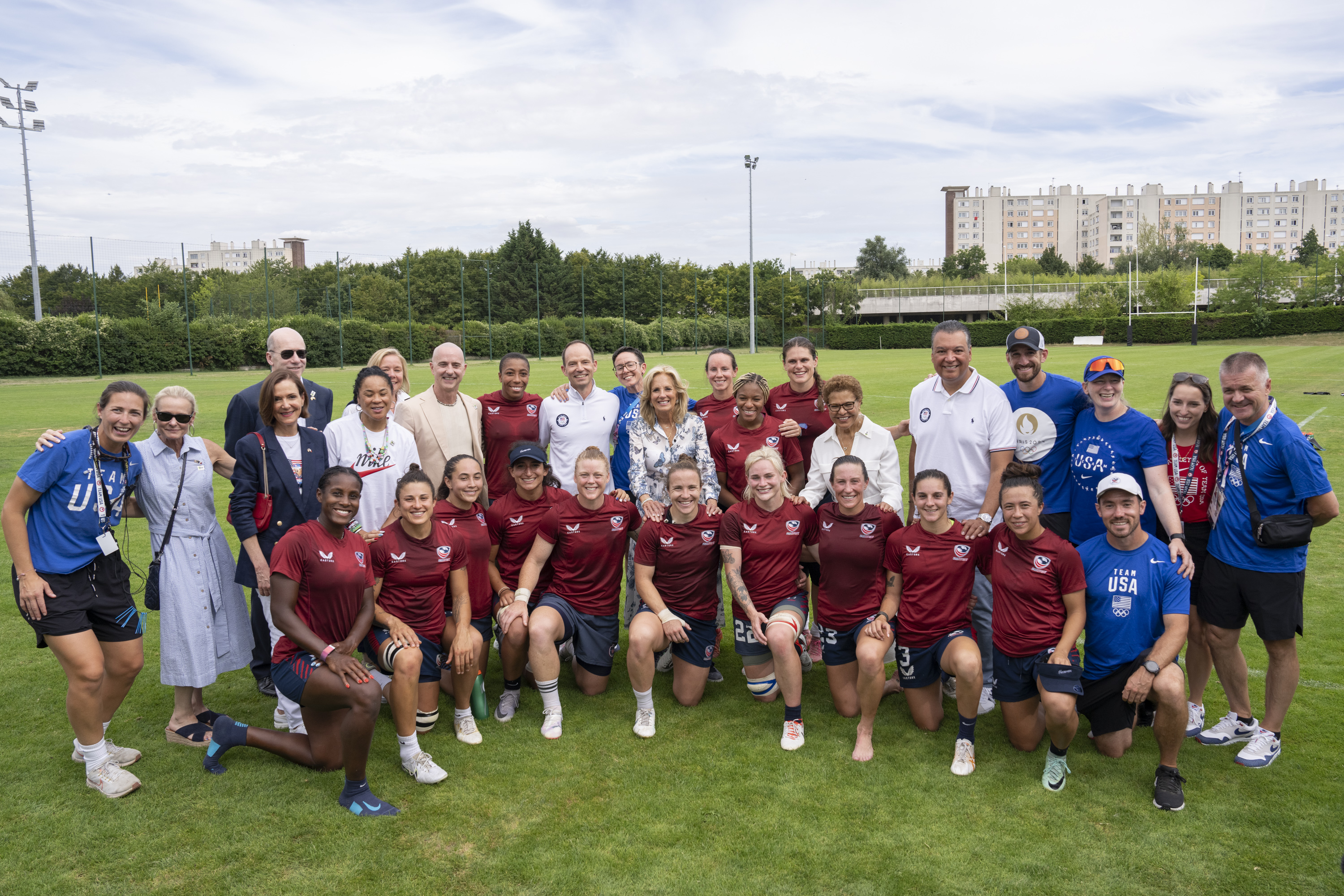
- First Lady Jill Biden and members of the U.S. delegation to the 2024 Summer Olympic Games pose for a photo with members of the U.S. women’s rugby team, Thursday, July 25, 2024, in Saint-Gratien, France. (Official White House Photo by Erin Scott)

Personal information
- Born: March 25, 2000 (age 26)
- Home town: Philadelphia, Pennsylvania, U.S.
- Height: 5 ft 3 in (160 cm)
- University: Dartmouth College

Rugby union career
- Position: Wing
National sevens team
Years	Team	Comps
2021-	United States	
Medal record
Women's rugby sevens
Representing United States
Olympic Games
Bronze medal – third place	2024 Paris	Team competition

Ariana Ramsey OLY (/ˌæriˈɑːnə/ ARR-ee-AH-nə; born March 25, 2000) is an American rugby sevens player. She represented the United States at the 2020 and 2024 Summer Olympics, winning bronze in 2024.

== Early life and education ==
Ramsey grew up in Bridgeport, Pennsylvania. She attended Upper Merion Area High School, where she began playing rugby her sophomore year of high school. Ramsey was eventually named her team MVP for rugby, while also lettering in wrestling, track, cheerleading, and field hockey. She credits her success in rugby, in part, to her multi-sport background.

Ramsey enrolled at Dartmouth College in 2018, scoring her first collegiate try in a NIRA semifinal win against Army. In 2021, she became the first Dartmouth women's rugby player to compete in the Olympics.

== International career ==
Ramsey played for the United States women's national rugby sevens team at the delayed 2020 Summer Olympics in Tokyo in 2021. The Eagles placed sixth at the competition. Ramsey tore her ACL during the Eagles' opening match against China, leading her to sit out her senior season at Dartmouth.

She returned to play for the Eagles at the 2024 Summer Olympics in Paris. In the bronze medal match, Ramsey passed to Alex Sedrick, who scored a last-minute try to win bronze for the United States against defending champions Australia.

Ramsey continued with the USA sevens team for the 2025-26 SVNS season, her performances including a try in the third-place play-off of the 2026 Canada Sevens in a 35-21 win over France, and a try in the final of the 2026 Spain Sevens in Valladolid.

Ramsey was nominated for Women's SVNS Player of the Year and was named in the SVNS Team of the Season in June 2026.

== Personal life ==
Ramsey is a certified personal trainer.
