= Piper Logan =

Canadian rugby sevens player

Piper Logan OLY
- Born: 13 July 2001 (age 25) Calgary, Alberta, Canada
- Height: 1.64 m (5 ft 5 in)
- Weight: 60 kg (132 lb)

Rugby union career
- Position: Wing
National sevens team
Years	Team	Comps
2022–	Canada	
Medal record
Women's rugby sevens
Representing Canada
Olympics
Silver medal – second place	2024 Paris	Team competition
Pan American Games
Silver medal – second place	2023 Santiago	Team competition

Piper Logan OLY (born 13 July 2001) is a Canadian rugby sevens player. She was part of the Canada team which won silver medals at the 2024 Summer Olympics and the 2023 Pan American Games.

== Career ==
Logan was named in Canada's sevens squad and competed at the 2022 Commonwealth Games in Birmingham. Her side lost to New Zealand in the bronze medal match to finish in fourth place. She was named in the tournament's dream team for the top seven players from the event.

She also represented Canada at the Rugby World Cup Sevens in Cape Town. They placed sixth overall after losing to Fiji in the fifth place final.

Logan was part of the Canadian squad which won a silver medal at the 2023 Pan American Games in Santiago, Chile, scoring both her team's tries as they lost 12–19 to the USA in the final.

She was chosen for the 2024 Summer Olympics in Paris, France, and scored a try in the semi-finals as Canada came from 0–12 behind to defeat Australia 21–12 to reach the final for the first time. They lost the final to New Zealand and were therefore awarded the silver medal.

Logan was named captain of the Canada squad for the 2024–25 SVNS but tore ligaments in her knee during the Vancouver tournament in February 2025 and subsequently missed the rest of the season.

== Personal life ==
Logan is a student at the University of British Columbia.
