= 2023 RAN Sevens =

Rugby tournament

- Hosts: Canada
- Date: August 19–20; 2023
- Nations: 7

Final positions
- Champions: United States
- Runners-up: Canada
- Third: Mexico

Series details
- Matches played: 16

The 2023 RAN Sevens are a North American rugby sevens tournament for the Rugby Americas North region of World Rugby that took place at the Starlight Stadium, Langford, British Columbia on 19 and 20 August 2023; they were held in Canada for the second time. The defending champions are Jamaica. The winners will earn qualification to the 2024 Olympics.

== Format ==
The teams are divided into two round-robin pools and each play matches against their pool opponents. The top two sides in each pool advance to the Cup semi-finals, from which the winners advance to the final / third-place matches.

The remaining teams that did not qualify for the Cup rounds compete in a Plate round-robin pool for fifth to seventh place.

== Teams ==
The six teams competing in British Columbia were:

- Barbados
- Bermuda
- Canada
- Jamaica
- Mexico
- United States

Saint Lucia, Saint Vincent and the Grenadines and Cayman Islands withdrew before the tournament.

== Pool stage ==
All times in Pacific Time Zone (UTC−07:00)

Legend
Advanced to Cup semi-finals
Advanced to Cup quarter-finals

=== Pool A ===
Team	Pld	W	D	L	PF	PA	PD	Pts
United States	2	2	0	0	102	0	102	6
Mexico	2	1	0	1	35	47	–12	4
Bermuda	2	0	0	2	7	97	–90	2

August 19	Mexico	35–7	Bermuda	Starlight Stadium
10:30

August 19	United States	62–0	Bermuda	Starlight Stadium
13:14

August 19	Mexico	0–40	United States	Starlight Stadium
15:58

=== Pool B ===
Team	Pld	W	D	L	PF	PA	PD	Pts
Canada	2	2	0	0	59	12	47	6
Jamaica	2	1	0	1	41	21	20	4
Barbados	2	0	0	2	0	67	–67	2

August 19	Jamaica	29–0	Barbados	Starlight Stadium
11:14

August 19	Canada	38–0	Barbados	Starlight Stadium
13:58

August 19	Jamaica	12–21	Canada	Starlight Stadium
16:42

== Knockout stage ==
=== Plate ===
Final
20 August – Starlight Stadium
Barbados	31
Bermuda	0

=== Cup ===
Quarter Finals
20 August - Starlight Stadium
Mexico	29
Barbados	5
20 August - Starlight Stadium
Jamaica	45
Bermuda	0

Semi-finals
20 August - Starlight Stadium
Canada	54
Mexico	5
20 August - Starlight Stadium
United States	30
Jamaica	0

Final
20 August - Starlight Stadium
Canada	14
United States	24
Third place
20 August - Starlight Stadium
Mexico	10
Jamaica	7

== Standings ==
Legend
Qualified for the 2024 Olympics
Qualified for the 2024 Repechage

Rank	Team
1st place, gold medalist(s)	United States
2nd place, silver medalist(s)	Canada
3rd place, bronze medalist(s)	Mexico
4	Jamaica
5	Barbados
6	Bermuda
