= 2023 RAN Women's Sevens =

Rugby tournament

- Hosts: Canada
- Date: August 19–20; 2023
- Nations: 4

Final positions
- Champions: Canada
- Runners-up: Mexico
- Third: Jamaica

Series details
- Matches played: 12

The 2023 RAN Women's Sevens are a North American rugby sevens tournament that took place at the Starlight Stadium, Langford on 19 and 20 August 2023; they were held in Canada for the second time. The defending champions are Mexico. The winners will earn qualification to the 2024 Olympics.

== Format ==
The teams a round-robin pool and each play against their pool opponents. The top two sides play in the final, the third and fourth place teams play for Bronze.

== Teams ==
The four teams competing in British Columbia were:

- Canada
- Jamaica
- Mexico
- Saint Lucia

Bermuda and Saint Vincent and the Grenadines withdrew before the tournament.

== Pool stage ==
All times in Pacific Time Zone (UTC−07:00)

Team	Pld	W	D	L	PF	PA	PD	Pts
Canada	3	3	0	0	194	0	194	9
Jamaica	3	2	0	1	43	70	–27	7
Mexico	3	1	0	2	26	97	–71	5
Saint Lucia	3	0	0	3	15	111	–96	3

August 19	Canada	82–0	Mexico	Starlight Stadium
11:36

August 19	Canada	59–0	Saint Lucia	Starlight Stadium
14:20

August 19	Mexico	7–10	Jamaica	Starlight Stadium
14:42

August 19	Jamaica	0–53	Canada	Starlight Stadium
17:26

August 20	Jamaica	33–10	Saint Lucia	Starlight Stadium
12:09

August 20	Saint Lucia	5–19	Mexico	Starlight Stadium
14:41

== Knockout stage ==
Semi-finals
Canada	41
Saint Lucia	7
Jamaica	12
Mexico	19

Final
Canada	53
Mexico	0
Third place
Saint Lucia	12
Jamaica	27

== Standings ==
Legend
Qualified for the 2024 Olympics
Qualified for the 2024 Repechage

Rank	Team
1st place, gold medalist(s)	Canada
2nd place, silver medalist(s)	Mexico
3rd place, bronze medalist(s)	Jamaica
4	Saint Lucia
