= 2023 Asia Rugby Sevens Olympic Qualifying Tournament =

Rugby sevens tournament in Osaka, Japan

- Hosts: Japan
- Date: 18–19 November
- Nations: 8

Final positions
- Champions: Japan
- Runners-up: Hong Kong
- Third: China

The 2023 Asia Rugby Sevens Olympic Qualifying Tournament was a rugby sevens tournament held in Osaka from 18 to 19 November 2023. This tournament served as the 2024 Olympic Rugby Sevens regional qualifier, the winner of the tournament collected direct qualification to the 2024 Summer Olympics, whilst the runner-up and third-place finisher advanced to the Olympic repechage tournament.

== Teams ==
All match times in Japan Standard Time (UTC+9)

1. Japan
2. Hong Kong
3. United Arab Emirates
4. China
5. South Korea
6. Singapore
7. Thailand
8. India

== Pool stage ==
Key to colours in group tables
Advance to Cup Semifinal

=== Pool A ===
Team	Pld	W	D	L	PF	PA	PD	Pts
Japan	3	2	0	1	98	21	+77	7
China	3	2	0	1	81	50	+31	7
South Korea	3	2	0	1	72	53	+19	7
India	3	0	0	3	7	134	–127	3

18 November
11:40

China	19–29	South Korea

Yodoko Sakura Stadium

18 November
12:05

Japan	50–0	India

Yodoko Sakura Stadium

18 November
15:00

China	41–7	India

Yodoko Sakura Stadium

18 November
15:25

Japan	34–0	South Korea

Yodoko Sakura Stadium

18 November
18:20

South Korea	43–0	India

Yodoko Sakura Stadium

18 November
18:45

Japan	14–21	China

Yodoko Sakura Stadium

=== Pool B ===
Team	Pld	W	D	L	PF	PA	PD	Pts
Hong Kong	3	3	0	0	129	0	+129	9
United Arab Emirates	3	2	0	1	90	31	+59	7
Thailand	3	1	0	2	17	107	–90	5
Singapore	3	0	0	3	14	112	–98	3

18 November
12:30

United Arab Emirates	43–7	Singapore

Yodoko Sakura Stadium

18 November
12:55

Hong Kong	53–0	Thailand

Yodoko Sakura Stadium

18 November
15:50

United Arab Emirates	47–0	Thailand

Yodoko Sakura Stadium

18 November
16:15

Hong Kong	52–0	Singapore

Yodoko Sakura Stadium

18 November
19:10

Singapore	7–17	Thailand

Yodoko Sakura Stadium

18 November
19:35

Hong Kong	24–0	United Arab Emirates

Yodoko Sakura Stadium

== Knockout stage ==
=== Fifth place ===
Semi-finals
South Korea	33
Singapore	0
Thailand	15
India	12

Fifth place
South Korea	38
Thailand	0
Seventh place
Singapore	7
India	12

=== Cup ===
Semi-finals
Japan	21
United Arab Emirates	5
Hong Kong	19
China	12

Final
Japan	21
Hong Kong	14
Third place
United Arab Emirates	0
China	36

== Standings ==
Legend
Qualified to 2024 Summer Olympics
Qualified to Olympic repechage

Rank	Team
1st place, gold medalist(s)	Japan
2nd place, silver medalist(s)	Hong Kong
3rd place, bronze medalist(s)	China
4	United Arab Emirates
5	South Korea
6	Thailand
7	India
8	Singapore
