= 2023 Sudamérica rugby sevens Olympic qualifying tournament =

- Host nation: Uruguay
- Date: 17–18 June 2023

Cup
- Champion: Uruguay
- Runner-up: Chile
- Third: Brazil

Tournament details
- Matches played: 18

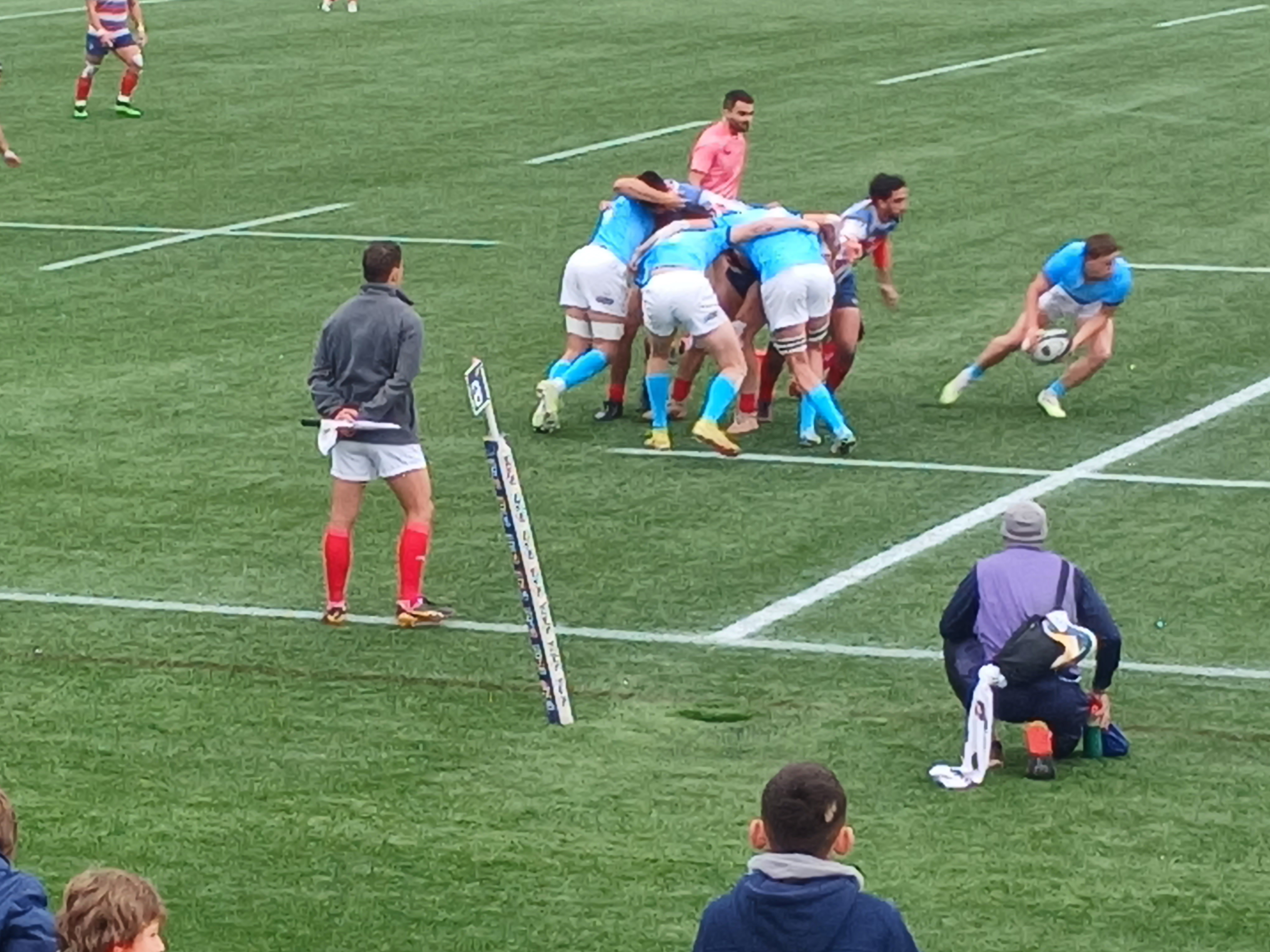
Paraguay vs Uruguay match

The 2023 Sudamérica rugby men's sevens Olympic qualifying tournament was held 17–18 June 2023 at the Estadio Charrúa in Montevideo, Uruguay. The gold medalists in the men's tournament qualified for the 2024 Summer Olympics, with the runner-up and third place participants both qualifying to the 2024 Olympics repechage tournament.

== Teams ==
- Brazil
- Chile
- Colombia
- Paraguay
- Peru
- Uruguay

== Pool stage ==
All times in Uruguay Time (UTC−03:00)

Legend
Qualified for final
Qualified for 3rd-place play-off
Qualified for 5th-place play-off

=== Standings ===
Team	Pld	W	D	L	PF	PA	PD	Pts
Uruguay	5	5	0	0	191	26	165	15
Chile	5	4	0	1	169	19	150	13
Brazil	5	3	0	2	142	75	67	11
Colombia	5	2	0	3	50	159	–109	9
Paraguay	5	1	0	4	38	127	–89	7
Peru	5	0	0	5	17	201	–184	5

=== Matches ===
17 June 2023
10:09

Brazil	36–7	Colombia

Estadio Charrúa, Montevideo

17 June 2023
10:32

Chile	31–0	Paraguay

Estadio Charrúa, Montevideo

17 June 2023
11:18

Uruguay	55–0	Peru

Estadio Charrúa, Montevideo

17 June 2023
12:55

Brazil	5–36	Chile

Estadio Charrúa, Montevideo

17 June 2023
13:18

Uruguay	52–0	Colombia

Estadio Charrúa, Montevideo

17 June 2023
13:41

Paraguay	12–10	Peru

Estadio Charrúa, Montevideo

17 June 2023
16:04

Colombia	26–7	Peru

Estadio Charrúa, Montevideo

17 June 2023
16:27

Brazil	26–5	Paraguay

Estadio Charrúa, Montevideo

17 June 2023
16:50

Chile	12–14	Uruguay

Estadio Charrúa, Montevideo

18 June 2023
09:46

Colombia	17–14	Paraguay

Estadio Charrúa, Montevideo

18 June 2023
10:09

Uruguay	27–7	Brazil

Estadio Charrúa, Montevideo

18 June 2023
10:32

Chile	40–0	Peru

Estadio Charrúa, Montevideo

18 June 2023
12:55

Colombia	0–50	Chile

Estadio Charrúa, Montevideo

18 June 2023
13:18

Uruguay	43–7	Paraguay

Estadio Charrúa, Montevideo

18 June 2023
13:41

Brazil	68–0	Peru

Estadio Charrúa, Montevideo

== Knockout stage ==
=== 5th place ===
Final
18 June – 16:28 – Estadio Charrua
Paraguay	24
Peru	26

=== 3rd place ===
Final
18 June – 17:18 – Estadio Charrua
Brazil (aet)	19
Colombia	14

=== Final ===
Final
18 June – 18:08 – Estadio Charrua
Uruguay	12
Chile	5

== Standings ==
Legend
	Qualified for the 2024 Olympics
	Qualified for the 2024 Repechage

Rank	Team
1st place, gold medalist(s)	Uruguay
2nd place, silver medalist(s)	Chile
3rd place, bronze medalist(s)	Brazil
4	Colombia
5	Peru
6	Paraguay
