= 2023 Sudamérica rugby women's sevens Olympic qualifying tournament =

- Host nation: Uruguay
- Date: 17–18 June 2023

Cup
- Champion: Brazil
- Runner-up: Argentina
- Third: Paraguay

Tournament details
- Matches played: 21

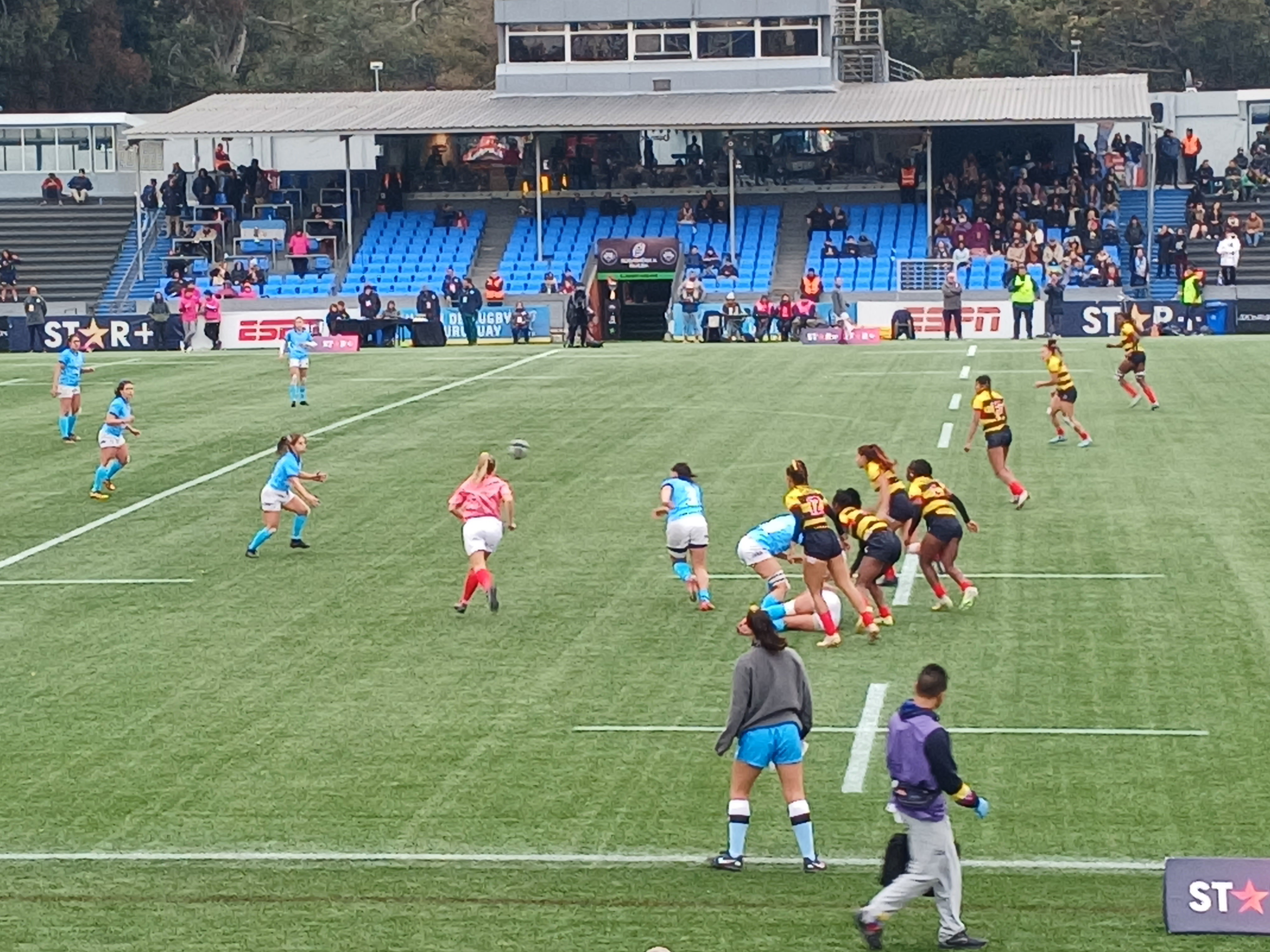
Colombia vs Uruguay match

The 2023 Sudamérica rugby women's sevens Olympic qualifying tournament was held from 17 to 18 June 2023 at the Estadio Charrúa in Montevideo, Uruguay. The gold medalists in the women's tournament qualified for the 2024 Summer Olympics, with the runner-up and third place participants both qualifying to the 2024 Olympics repechage tournament.

== Teams ==
- Argentina
- Brazil
- Chile
- Colombia
- Paraguay
- Peru
- Uruguay

== Tournament ==
All times in Uruguay Time (UTC−03:00)

Legend
Qualified for Olympics
Qualified for Olympic repechage

=== Standings ===
Team	Pld	W	D	L	PF	PA	PD	Pts
Brazil	6	6	0	0	202	12	190	18
Argentina	6	5	0	1	181	24	157	16
Paraguay	6	3	1	2	85	103	–18	13
Colombia	6	2	1	3	82	95	–13	11
Chile	6	2	0	4	50	157	–107	10
Uruguay	6	2	0	4	48	141	–93	10
Peru	6	0	0	6	31	147	–116	6

=== Matches ===
17 June 2023
09:00

Colombia	0–19	Argentina

Estadio Charrúa, Montevideo

17 June 2023
09:23

Brazil	27–0	Peru

Estadio Charrúa, Montevideo

17 June 2023
09:46

Chile	14–12	Uruguay

Estadio Charrúa, Montevideo

17 June 2023
11:46

Brazil	17–5	Argentina

Estadio Charrúa, Montevideo

17 June 2023
12:09

Chile	17–12	Peru

Estadio Charrúa, Montevideo

17 June 2023
12:32

Uruguay	7–24	Paraguay

Estadio Charrúa, Montevideo

17 June 2023
14:32

Colombia	34–7	Peru

Estadio Charrúa, Montevideo

17 June 2023
14:55

Brazil	27–0	Paraguay

Estadio Charrúa, Montevideo

17 June 2023
15:18

Argentina	52–0	Chile

Estadio Charrúa, Montevideo

17 June 2023
17:18

Paraguay	14–14	Colombia

Estadio Charrúa, Montevideo

17 June 2023
17:41

Peru	0–12	Uruguay

Estadio Charrúa, Montevideo

18 June 2023
09:00

Paraguay	14–12	Chile

Estadio Charrúa, Montevideo

18 June 2023
09:46

Argentina	43–0	Uruguay

Estadio Charrúa, Montevideo

18 June 2023
11:23

Colombia	22–0	Chile

Estadio Charrúa, Montevideo

18 June 2023
11:46

Peru	0–31	Argentina

Estadio Charrúa, Montevideo

18 June 2023
12:09

Brazil	48–0	Uruguay

Estadio Charrúa, Montevideo

18 June 2023
14:04

Paraguay	26–12	Peru

Estadio Charrúa, Montevideo

18 June 2023
14:27

Chile	7–45	Brazil

Estadio Charrúa, Montevideo

18 June 2023
14:50

Colombia	12–17	Uruguay

Estadio Charrúa, Montevideo

18 June 2023
16:53

Paraguay	7–31	Argentina

Estadio Charrúa, Montevideo

18 June 2023
17:43

Brazil	38–0	Colombia

Estadio Charrúa, Montevideo

== Standings ==
Legend
	Qualified for the 2024 Olympics
	Qualified for the 2024 repechage

Rank	Team
1st place, gold medalist(s)	Brazil
2nd place, silver medalist(s)	Argentina
3rd place, bronze medalist(s)	Paraguay
4	Colombia
5	Chile
6	Uruguay
7	Peru
