= 2023 Asia Rugby Women's Sevens Olympic Qualifying Tournament =

- Hosts: Japan
- Date: 18–19 November 2023
- Nations: 7

Final positions
- Champions: Japan
- Runners-up: China
- Third: Hong Kong

The 2023 Asia Rugby Women's Sevens Olympic Qualifying Tournament was a rugby sevens tournament held in Osaka from 18 to 19 November 2023. This tournament served as the 2024 Olympic Rugby Sevens regional qualifier, the winner of the tournament collected direct qualification to the 2024 Summer Olympics, whilst the runner-up and third-place finisher advanced to the Olympic repechage tournament.

== Teams ==
All match times in Japan Standard Time (UTC+9)

1. Japan
2. China
3. Hong Kong
4. Thailand
5. Kazakhstan
6. India
7. Guam

== Pool stage ==
Key to colours in group tables
Advance to Cup Semifinal

=== Pool D ===
Team	Pld	W	D	L	PF	PA	PD	Pts
Japan	2	2	0	0	62	0	+62	6
Thailand	2	1	0	1	22	19	+3	4
Kazakhstan	2	0	0	2	0	65	–65	2

18 November
11:15

Thailand	22–0	Kazakhstan

Yodoko Sakura Stadium

18 November
14:10

Japan	43–0	Kazakhstan

Yodoko Sakura Stadium

18 November
17:05

Japan	19–0	Thailand

Yodoko Sakura Stadium

=== Pool E ===
Team	Pld	W	D	L	PF	PA	PD	Pts
China	3	3	0	0	164	0	+164	9
Hong Kong	3	2	0	1	77	55	+22	7
India	3	1	0	2	33	112	–79	5
Guam	3	0	0	3	21	128	–107	3

18 November
11:40

Hong Kong	29–5	India

Yodoko Sakura Stadium

18 November
12:05

China	52–0	Guam

Yodoko Sakura Stadium

18 November
14:35

Hong Kong	48–0	Guam

Yodoko Sakura Stadium

18 November
15:00

China	62–0	India

Yodoko Sakura Stadium

18 November
17:30

India	28–21	Guam

Yodoko Sakura Stadium

18 November
17:55

China	50–0	Hong Kong

Yodoko Sakura Stadium

== Knockout stage ==
=== Fifth place ===
Semi-finals
India	-
BYE	-
Kazakhstan	52
Guam	0

Fifth place
India	0
Kazakhstan	39
Seventh place
BYE	-
Guam	-

=== Cup ===
Semi-finals
Japan	33
Hong Kong	5
China	29
Thailand	5

Final
Japan	21
China	14
Third place
Hong Kong	12
Thailand	0

== Standings ==
Legend
Qualified to 2024 Summer Olympics
Qualified to Olympic repechage

Rank	Team
1st place, gold medalist(s)	Japan
2nd place, silver medalist(s)	China
3rd place, bronze medalist(s)	Hong Kong
4	Thailand
5	Kazakhstan
6	India
7	Guam
