= Asia Rugby Women's Sevens Series =

Regional rugby championship in Asia

- Most recent season or competition: 2025 Asia Rugby Women's Sevens Series
- Sport: Rugby sevens
- Founded: 2000; 26 years ago
- Most recent champion: China (2024)
- Most titles: Japan (9 titles)

The Asia Rugby Women's Sevens Series is the regional championship for women's international rugby sevens in Asia. Initially contested as a single tournament, the championship was expanded into a two-tournament series in 2014. The competition is sanctioned and sponsored by Asia Rugby, which is the rugby union governing body for the region.

The first official regional 7s championship for international women's teams from Asia was held in Hong Kong, played as part of the 2000 Hong Kong Sevens tournament. In 2003, ten international teams competed in a separate tournament for the Asia Champions Cup, with six teams progressing to the Hong Kong Women's Sevens. Since then, the regional 7s championships have periodically served as pre-qualifying competitions for the Rugby 7s World Cup, or other sevens tournaments.

== Background ==
Rugby sevens – also known as 7-a-side, or 7s – is a short form of the sport of rugby union that was first played in 1883. The first (men's) internationals took place in 1973. As women's rugby union developed in the 1960s and 1970s the format became very popular as it allowed games, and entire leagues, to be developed in countries even when player numbers were small, and it remains the main form the women's game is played in most parts of the world.

However, although the first women's international rugby union 15-a-side test match took place in 1982, it was not until 1997 before the first women's international 7s tournaments were played, when the 1997 Hong Kong Sevens included a women's tournament for the first time. Over the next decade the number of tournaments grew, with almost every region developing regular championship competitions. This reached its zenith with 2009's inaugural women's tournament for the Rugby World Cup Sevens, shortly followed by the announcement that women's rugby sevens would be included in the Olympics from 2016.

== Tournaments ==
=== Asia Rugby Women's Sevens Series ===
Tournaments that have featured as ranking events in the Asia Rugby Women's Sevens include:

- China Women's Sevens
- Hong Kong Women's Sevens
- India Women's Sevens
- Korean Women's Sevens
- Sri Lanka Women's Sevens
- Thailand Women's Sevens
- Dubai Women's Sevens

The continental title was contested in a single tournament from 2000 to 2012 (Asia Rugby Women's Championship). The Asian Women's Sevens Series was introduced in 2013.

Host Year	China	Hong Kong	India	(South Korea) Korea	Malaysia	Singapore	Sri Lanka	Thailand	United Arab Emirates	Ranking events
2013			Pune					Bang Saen		2
2014	Beijing	Hong Kong								2
2015 ^{a}	Qingdao						Colombo			2
2016		Hong Kong		Incheon			Colombo			3
2017 ^{b}				Incheon			Colombo			2
2018		Hong Kong		Incheon			Colombo			3
2019	Huizhou			Incheon			Colombo			3
2020^{c}	Cancelled due to the COVID-19 pandemic									
2021 ^{d}	Cancelled due to the COVID-19 pandemic								Dubai	1
2022				Incheon				Bangkok	Dubai	3
2023				Incheon				Bangkok		2
2024	Hangzhou			Incheon				Bangkok		3
Total	3	3	1	7	0	0	5	3	2	26

Notes:

^a A separate Olympic Asian qualification series was held in 2015 with a pre-qualifying stage hosted in Chennai and final stages in Hong Kong and Tokyo.

^b The 2017 Asian Women's Trophy tournament was held in Vientiane, Laos

^c The 2020 series was cancelled before any events were held, due to impacts of the COVID-19 pandemic.

^d Incheon, Huizhou and Colombo were originally scheduled as legs of the 2021 series. Due to impacts of the COVID-19 pandemic, all three of those events were cancelled and replaced – initially by two events planned for Dubai, but eventually by just one event in Dubai.

==== Champions ====
Winners of the Asian Women's Sevens Championship:

Year	Venue	Winner	Refs
2000 (Note: From 2000–2003 the tournaments were played as part of the Hong Kong sevens tournament.)	Hong Kong	Kazakhstan	
2001	Hong Kong	Kazakhstan	
2002	Hong Kong	Kazakhstan	
2003	Hong Kong	Kazakhstan	
2004	Almaty	Kazakhstan	
2005	Singapore	Kazakhstan	
2006	Tashkent	China	
2007	Doha	Kazakhstan	
2008	Hong Kong	Japan	
2009	Pattaya	China	
2010	Canton	China	

Year	Venue	Winner	Refs
2011	Pune	China	
2012	Pune	Fiji	
2013	two rounds	Japan	
2014	two rounds	China	
2015	two rounds	Japan	
2016	three rounds	Japan	
2017	two rounds	Japan	
2018	three rounds	Japan	
2019	three rounds	Japan	
2020	Not contested		
2021	Dubai	Japan	
2022	three rounds	China	
2023	two rounds	Japan	
2024	three rounds	China	

=== Asia Rugby Women’s Sevens Trophy ===
Year	Host	Winner	Refs
2017	Laos	South Korea	
2018	Brunei	Malaysia	
2019	Indonesia	Philippines	
2021	Qatar	United Arab Emirates	
2022	Indonesia	Singapore	
2023	Qatar	United Arab Emirates	
2024	Nepal	Philippines	

=== Asia Pacific Women’s Sevens Championship ===
Year	Host	Winner
2010	Malaysia	Kazakhstan
2011	Malaysia	Papua New Guinea
2012	Malaysia	Australia
2013	China	China
2015	Malaysia	Japan

== 2007 South East Asia Sevens ==
The 2007 South East Asia Sevens was held on 6 October 2007 in Singapore.

=== Group Stage ===
Teams	P	W	D	L	PF	PA	PD	
Thailand	5	5	0	0	245	0	+245	Qualify for Cup final
Singapore	5	4	0	1	171	26	+145	Qualify for Cup final
South Korea	5	3	0	2	40	125	–85	Qualify for Plate final
Laos	5	1	1	3	32	118	–86	Qualify for Plate final
Cambodia	5	1	1	3	24	113	–89	Qualify for Bowl final
Cambodia Select	5	0	0	5	0	130	–130	Qualify for Bowl final

Cambodia	0–15	South Korea

Singapore	48–0	Laos

Cambodia Select	0–50	Thailand

Cambodia	7–7	Laos

Thailand	26–0	Singapore

Cambodia Select	0–10	South Korea

Cambodia	0–32	Singapore

Thailand	62–0	South Korea

Cambodia Select	0–15	Laos

Cambodia	0–59	Thailand

Cambodia Select	0–38	Singapore

South Korea	15–10	Laos

Cambodia	17–0	Cambodia Select

Singapore	53–0	South Korea

Thailand	48–0	Laos

=== Classification Stage ===
Bowl Final

Cambodia	25–10	Cambodia Select

Plate Final

Laos	12–10	South Korea

Cup Final

Thailand	22–0	Singapore

== See also ==
- Asia Rugby Sevens Series (for men)
