= China Women's Sevens =

- Sport: Rugby sevens
- Founded: 2013
- Country: China
- Most titles: New Zealand (2 titles)
- Related competitions: China Sevens

The China Women's Sevens was officially part of the first-ever IRB Women's Sevens World Series and was one of four rounds included in the inaugural 2012–13 Series which was played at the University Town Stadium in Guangzhou. The 2013–14 season was the last time that the tournament was incorporated as an IRB event.

The China Women's Sevens has also featured separately as part of the Asia Rugby Women's Sevens Series.

== Results ==
=== IRB Women's Sevens World Series ===
Year	Venue	Cup			Plate	Bowl
Year	Venue	Winner	Final Score	Runner-up	Winner	Winner
2013	Guangzhou University Town Stadium	New Zealand	19–5	England	Ireland	Japan
2014	Guangzhou University Town Stadium	New Zealand	26–12	Australia	England	Ireland

=== Asia Rugby Women's Sevens Series ===
Year	Venue	Cup			Plate		
Year	Venue	Winner	Final Score	Runner-up	Winner	Final Score	Runner-up
2014	Beijing	Japan	24–19	China	Thailand	25–5	Sri Lanka
2015	Qingdao	Hong Kong	26–15	China	Thailand	27–0	Singapore
2019	Huizhou	Japan	22–17	China	Thailand	36–0	Malaysia

== See also ==
- World Rugby Women's Sevens Series
- Asia Rugby Women's Sevens Series
- China Sevens (Men's)
