= 2010 Hong Kong Women's Sevens =

- Host nation: Hong Kong
- Date: 26–27 March

Cup
- Champion: (Australia) Aussie Amazons
- Runner-up: China

Plate
- Winner: Thailand
- Runner-up: Hong Kong

Bowl
- Winner: Japan U-23
- Runner-up: Singapore

Tournament details
- Matches played: 25

The 2010 Hong Kong Women's Sevens was the 13th edition of the tournament and was held on the 26th and 27 March. The women's competition was held at the Hong Kong Football Club on 26 March, with the Cup final played at the Hong Kong Stadium on the 27th.

The Aussie Amazons claimed the Cup title after defeating China in the final.

== Teams ==
Twelve teams competed in the tournament with Malaysia making their Women's Sevens debut.

- China
- Malaysia
- Papua New Guinea
- (Australia) Aussie Amazons
- (Cooperation Council for the Arab States of the Gulf) Arabian Gulf
- Singapore
- Thailand
- Hong Kong
- Japan U-23
- Aotearoa Maori
- Kazakhstan
- (South Africa) South African Tuks

== Group Stages ==
=== Pool A ===
Nation	Won	Drawn	Lost	For	Against
China	2	0	0	66	0
Malaysia	1	0	1	20	46
Papua New Guinea	0	0	2	0	40

Malaysia	20–0	Papua New Guinea

China	20–0	Papua New Guinea

Malaysia	0–46	China

=== Pool B ===
Nation	Won	Drawn	Lost	For	Against
(Australia) Aussie Amazons	2	0	0	119	0
(Cooperation Council for the Arab States of the Gulf) Arabian Gulf	1	0	1	26	59
Singapore	0	0	2	17	85

Arabian Gulf (Cooperation Council for the Arab States of the Gulf)	26–17	Singapore

Aussie Amazons (Australia)	60–0	Singapore

Arabian Gulf (Cooperation Council for the Arab States of the Gulf)	0–59	(Australia) Aussie Amazons

=== Pool C ===
Nation	Won	Drawn	Lost	For	Against
Thailand	2	0	0	41	19
Hong Kong	1	0	1	24	27
Japan U-23	0	0	2	12	31

Japan U-23	5–12	Hong Kong

Thailand	22–12	Hong Kong

Japan U-23	7–24	Thailand

=== Pool D ===
Nation	Won	Drawn	Lost	For	Against
Aotearoa Maori	2	0	0	80	7
Kazakhstan	1	0	1	31	50
(South Africa) South African Tuks	0	0	2	12	78

Kazakhstan	24–12	(South Africa) South African Tuks

Aotearoa Maori	54–0	(South Africa) South African Tuks

Kazakhstan	7–26	Aotearoa Maori

== Classification stages ==
=== Cup Quarter-finals ===
Quarter-finals
China	38
(Cooperation Council for the Arab States of the Gulf) Arabian Gulf	5
(Australia) Aussie Amazons	38
Malaysia	0
Aotearoa Maori	47
Hong Kong	0
Kazakhstan	17
Thailand	14

Semi-finals
(Australia) Aussie Amazons	12
Aotearoa Maori	5
China	14
Kazakhstan	7

Cup Final
(Australia) Aussie Amazons	26
China	0

=== Plate Semi-finals ===
Semi-finals
Thailand	N/A
(Cooperation Council for the Arab States of the Gulf) Arabian Gulf	N/A
Hong Kong	41
Malaysia	0

Plate Final
Thailand	17
Hong Kong	14

=== Bowl Semi-finals ===
Semi-finals
Singapore	N/A
(South Africa) South African Tuks	N/A
Japan U-23	14
Papua New Guinea	0

Bowl Final
Japan U-23	35
Singapore	7
