= 2010 ARFU Women's Sevens Championship =

- Host nation: China
- Date: 24–25 July 2010

Cup
- Champion: China
- Runner-up: Kazakhstan
- Third: Thailand

Tournament details
- Matches played: 34

The 2010 ARFU Women's Sevens Championship is the eleventh edition of the tournament and was held from 24 to 25 July 2010 at Guangzhou, China. Thirteen teams competed in the competition. China won their third title after defeating Kazakhstan in the Cup final.

== Pool Stage ==
=== Group A ===
Nation	Won	Drawn	Lost	For	Against	
China	2	0	0	75	7	Qualified to Quarter-finals
Hong Kong	1	0	1	38	39	Qualified to Quarter-finals
Philippines	0	0	2	38	67	Qualified to Tie breaker

China	39–7	Hong Kong

China	36–0	Philippines

Hong Kong	31–0	Philippines

=== Group B ===
Nation	Won	Drawn	Lost	For	Against	
Thailand	2	0	0	73	0	Qualified to Quarter-finals
Chinese Taipei	1	0	1	52	26	Qualified to Quarter-finals
South Korea	0	0	2	0	99	Qualified to Tie breaker

Thailand	26–0	Chinese Taipei

Thailand	47–0	South Korea

Chinese Taipei	52–0	South Korea

=== Group C ===
Nation	Won	Drawn	Lost	For	Against	
Kazakhstan	2	0	0	70	0	Qualified to Quarter-finals
Singapore	1	0	1	43	34	Qualified to Quarter-finals
India	0	0	2	0	79	Qualified to Tie breaker

Kazakhstan	34–0	Singapore

Kazakhstan	36–0	India

Singapore	43–0	India

=== Group D ===
Nation	Won	Drawn	Lost	For	Against	
Japan	3	0	0	123	12	Qualified to Quarter-finals
Uzbekistan	2	0	1	53	27	Qualified to Quarter-finals
Malaysia	1	0	2	19	87	Qualified for Bowl
Laos	0	0	3	5	74	Qualified for Bowl

Uzbekistan	7–5	Laos

Malaysia	0–53	Japan

Uzbekistan	34–0	Malaysia

Laos	0–48	Japan

Laos	0–19	Malaysia

Uzbekistan	12–22	Japan

== Classification Stage ==
=== Cup Quarter-finals ===
Quarter-finals
China	24
Uzbekistan	0
Japan	24
Hong Kong	0
Kazakhstan	36
Chinese Taipei	0
Thailand	45
Singapore	10

Semi-finals
China	19
Japan	7
Kazakhstan	25
Thailand	10

Cup Final
China	26
Kazakhstan	10
3rd Place
Thailand	19
Japan	0

=== Plate Semi-finals ===
Semi-finals
Uzbekistan	5
Hong Kong	14
Chinese Taipei	10
Singapore	19

Plate Final
Hong Kong	24
Singapore	12
7th Place
Chinese Taipei	22
Uzbekistan	7

=== Bowl Semi-finals ===
==== Tie Breaker ====
Nation	Won	Drawn	Lost	For	Against	
Philippines	2	0	0	48	0	Qualified for Bowl
India	1	0	1	22	24	Qualified for Bowl
South Korea	0	0	2	7	53	13th Place

Philippines	31–0	South Korea

South Korea	7–22	India

Philippines	17–0	India

Semi-finals
Malaysia	17
India	7
Laos	0
Philippines	40

Bowl Final
Philippines	20
Malaysia	0
11th Place
India	19
Laos	5
