= 2007 Hong Kong Women's Sevens =

- Host nation: Hong Kong
- Date: 29–30 March

Cup
- Champion: Aotearoa Maori NZ
- Runner-up: Australia

Plate
- Winner: United States
- Runner-up: China

Bowl
- Winner: Kazakhstan
- Runner-up: Canada

Tournament details
- Matches played: 28

The 2007 Hong Kong Women's Sevens was the tenth edition of the tournament. The event was held from the 29th to the 30th of March in Hong Kong. (Note: Source Hong Kong Union) Aotearoa Maori New Zealand won the tournament after defeating Australia in the final.

== Teams ==
Twelve teams competed at the tournament, Papua New Guinea made their debut in the competition.

- Aotearoa Maori New Zealand
- Canada
- Hong Kong
- Australia
- Kazakhstan
- (Cooperation Council for the Arab States of the Gulf) Arabian Gulf
- United States
- Thailand
- Papua New Guinea
- China
- Singapore
- Japan U-23

== Group stages ==
POOL A

| Nation | Won | Drawn | Lost | For | Against |
|---|---|---|---|---|---|
| Aotearoa Maori New Zealand | 2 | 0 | 0 | 85 | 0 |
| Canada | 1 | 0 | 1 | 38 | 21 |
| Hong Kong | 0 | 0 | 2 | 0 | 102 |

| Aotearoa Maori New Zealand | 64–0 | Hong Kong |

| Aotearoa Maori New Zealand | 21–0 | Canada |

| Canada | 38–0 | Hong Kong |

POOL B

| Nation | Won | Drawn | Lost | For | Against |
|---|---|---|---|---|---|
| Australia | 2 | 0 | 0 | 38 | 5 |
| Kazakhstan | 1 | 0 | 1 | 29 | 14 |
| (Cooperation Council for the Arab States of the Gulf) Arabian Gulf | 0 | 0 | 2 | 7 | 55 |

| Australia | 7–5 | Kazakhstan |

| Australia | 31–0 | (Cooperation Council for the Arab States of the Gulf) Arabian Gulf |

| Kazakhstan | 24–0 | (Cooperation Council for the Arab States of the Gulf) Arabian Gulf |

POOL C

| Nation | Won | Drawn | Lost | For | Against |
|---|---|---|---|---|---|
| United States | 2 | 0 | 0 | 60 | 0 |
| Thailand | 1 | 0 | 1 | 38 | 38 |
| Papua New Guinea | 0 | 0 | 2 | 0 | 60 |

| United States | 22–0 | Papua New Guinea |

| United States | 38–0 | Thailand |

| Thailand | 38–0 | Papua New Guinea |

POOL D

| Nation | Won | Drawn | Lost | For | Against |
|---|---|---|---|---|---|
| China | 2 | 0 | 0 | 57 | 0 |
| Singapore | 1 | 0 | 1 | 12 | 39 |
| Japan U-23 | 0 | 0 | 2 | 7 | 37 |

| China | 32–0 | Singapore |

| China | 25–0 | Japan U-23 |

| Singapore | 12–7 | Japan U-23 |

== Classification stages ==
=== Cup Quarter-finals ===
Quarter-finals
Australia | 49
Thailand | 0
United States | 12
Kazakhstan | 5
Aotearoa Maori NZ | 51
Singapore | 0
China | 15
Canada | 10

Semi-finals
Australia | 19
United States | 0
Aotearoa Maori NZ | 38
China | 0

Cup Final
Aotearoa Maori NZ | 10
Australia | 0
Plate Final
United States | 26
China | 5

=== Bowl Semi-finals ===
Semi-finals
Kazakhstan | 36
Thailand | 0
Canada | 47
Singapore | 0

Bowl Final
Kazakhstan | 21
Canada | 19
Shield Final
Thailand | 24
Singapore | 0

=== Vase Semi-finals ===
Semi-finals
Hong Kong | 12
Japan U-23 | 5
(Cooperation Council for the Arab States of the Gulf) Arabian Gulf | 17
Papua New Guinea | 0

Vase Final
(Cooperation Council for the Arab States of the Gulf) Arabian Gulf | 14
Hong Kong | 12
Spoon Final
Japan U-23 | 31
Papua New Guinea | 0
