= Bangladesh women's national rugby union team =

Women's rugby team

Bangladesh
- Nickname: Green Tigers
- Emblem: Green Tigers
- Union: Bangladesh Rugby Federation Union
- Head coach: Beili Akter
- Captain: Ferdous Alam
- Home stadium: Bangladesh Army Stadium
First colours	Second colours

World Rugby ranking
- Current: NR (as of 20 March 2023)

First international
- Bangladesh 0–28 Indonesia (at Jakarta, Indonesia, 10 August 2019)

Biggest win
- Did not win yet

Biggest defeat
- Bangladesh 0–28 Qatar (at Chennai, India, 11 August 2019)

World Cup
- Appearances: DNQ

The Bangladesh women's national rugby union team represents Bangladesh in women's international rugby union. The team has yet to make their debut at the Rugby World Cup Women's. The team participating Asian rugby tournaments.

== Team image ==
=== Nicknames ===
The Bangladesh women's national rugby union team has been known or nicknamed as "Green Tigers".

=== Home stadium ===
The team play its home matches on the Bangladesh Army Stadium and others stadiums.

== History ==
The Bangladesh women's national rugby union team formed on 18 February 2015 and its very young rugby team in Asia. The nation yet to qualify in the Asian level rugby tournament also Women's Rugby World Cup. They have participated in 2019 Asia Rugby Women's Sevens Series which finished ninth position.

== Players ==
As of 7 August 2019

The squad were played last 2019 Asia Rugby Women's Sevens Series.

S/N	Player	Position	Club
1	Kobita Roy	Hooker	Bangladesh
2	Beli Akter (c)	Hooker	Bangladesh
3	Mst Rupiya Akter	Prop	Bangladesh
4	Mst Rubina Akter	Prop	Bangladesh
5	Runa Akter	Prop	Bangladesh
6	Nisha Akter	Prop	Bangladesh
7	Rumi Akter	Lock	Bangladesh
8	Rekha Akter	Lock	Bangladesh
9	Most Mohosina Akter Lota	Lock	Bangladesh
10	Alisha Islam	Lock	Bangladesh
11	Ariya Islam	Prop	Bangladesh

== Results & fixtures ==
Legend

Win Draw Loss Fixture

=== 2019 ===
Indonesia was awarded as winner of game due to walk over Bangladesh .	10 August 2019	Indonesia	28–0	Bangladesh	Harapan Bangsa Stadium, Indonesia
	11:14

Laoa was awarded as winner of game due to walk over Bangladesh.	10 August 2019	Laos	28–0	Bangladesh	Harapan Bangsa Stadium, Indonesia
	14:21

South Korea was awarded as winner of game due to walk over Bangladesh.	11 August 2019	Bangladesh	0–28	South Korea	Harapan Bangsa Stadium, Indonesia
	16:44

Qatar was awarded as winner of game due to walk over Bangladesh.	11 August 2019	Qatar	28–0	Bangladesh	Harapan Bangsa Stadium, Indonesia
	11:10

== Overall records ==
The match record against all nations, updated to 11 August 2019, is as follows.

Opponent	Played	Won	Lost	Drawn	PF	PA
Qatar	1	0	0	0	0	39
Indonesia	1	0	0	0	0	28
South Korea	1	0	0	0	0	28
Laos	1	0	0	0	0	28
Total	4	0	4	0	0	112

== Competitive records ==
=== Rugby World Cup ===
Rugby World Cup record
Year	Round	Position	GP	W	D	L	PF	PA
(Wales) 1991	Did not qualify							
(Scotland) 1994	Did not qualify							
(Netherlands) 1998	Did not qualify							
(Spain) 2002	Did not qualify							
(Canada) 2006	Did not qualify							
(England) 2010	Did not qualify							
(France) 2014	Did not qualify							
(Republic of Ireland) 2017	Did not qualify							
(New Zealand) 2021	Did not qualify							
(England) 2025	To be determined							
(Australia) 2029	To be determined							
(United States) 2033	To be determined							
Total	0/9	0 Titles	0	0	0	0	0	0

=== Asian Women's Rugby Championship ===
Asian Women's Rugby Championship record
Year	Round	Position	GP	W	D	L	PF	PA
(China) 2006	Did not qualify							
(China) 2007	Did not qualify							
(Kazakhstan) 2008	Did not qualify							
(Japan) 2010	Did not qualify							
Total	0/4	0 Titles	0	0	0	0	0	0

=== Asian Women's Rugby Seven Series ===
Asia Rugby Women's Sevens record
Year	Round	Position	GP	W	D	L	PF	PA
(India) (Thailand) 2013	Did not participated							
(China) (Hong Kong) 2014	Did not participated							
(Sri Lanka) (China) 2015	Did not participated							
(Hong Kong) (China) (South Korea) 2016	Did not participated							
(Laos) (Sri Lanka) (South Korea) 2017	Did not participated							
(Hong Kong) (Sri Lanka) (South Korea) 2018	Did not participated							
(China) (Sri Lanka) (South Korea) 2019	First Round	9th	4	0	0	4	0	112
(Lebanon) (Uzbekistan) 2021	Did not participated							
(United Arab Emirates) (South Korea) (Thailand) 2022	Did not participated							
(Japan) 2023	Did not participated							
(China) (South Korea) (Thailand) 2024	Did not participated							
Total	1/11	0 Titles	4	0	0	4	0	112
