= 2008 Hong Kong Women's Sevens =

- Host nation: Hong Kong
- Date: 27–28 March

Cup
- Champion: United States
- Runner-up: Canada

Plate
- Winner: France
- Runner-up: Kazakhstan

Bowl
- Winner: China
- Runner-up: Japan

Tournament details
- Matches played: 28

The 2008 Hong Kong Women's Sevens was the eleventh edition of the tournament and was played on 27 and 28 March at Hong Kong's So Kon Po stadium, with the final at the International Stadium. (Note: Source HK Rugby and South China Morning Post)

The United States won the tournament after beating Canada in the Cup final.

== Teams ==
Twelve teams competed in the tournament.

- United States
- Netherlands
- Hong Kong
- Kazakhstan
- Papua New Guinea
- France
- China
- Thailand
- Japan
- Canada
- Singapore
- (Cooperation Council for the Arab States of the Gulf) Arabian Gulf

== Group stages ==
=== POOL A ===
Nation	Won	Drawn	Lost	For	Against
United States	2	0	0	69	7
Netherlands	1	0	1	27	53
Hong Kong	0	0	2	17	53

United States	36–7	Netherlands

United States	33–0	Hong Kong

Netherlands	20–17	Hong Kong

=== POOL B ===
Nation	Won	Drawn	Lost	For	Against
France	2	0	0	46	7
Kazakhstan	1	0	1	29	17
Papua New Guinea	0	0	2	0	51

Kazakhstan	22–0	Papua New Guinea

France	17–7	Kazakhstan

France	29–0	Papua New Guinea

=== POOL C ===
Nation	Won	Drawn	Lost	For	Against
China	2	0	0	41	7
Japan	1	0	1	29	15
Thailand	0	0	2	0	48

China	26–0	Thailand

China	15–7	Japan

Japan	22–0	Thailand

=== POOL D ===
Nation	Won	Drawn	Lost	For	Against
Canada	2	0	0	99	0
(Cooperation Council for the Arab States of the Gulf) Arabian Gulf	1	0	1	38	43
Singapore	0	0	2	0	94

Canada	56–0	Singapore

Canada	43–0	(Cooperation Council for the Arab States of the Gulf) Arabian Gulf

Arabian Gulf (Cooperation Council for the Arab States of the Gulf)	38–0	Singapore

== Classification stages ==
=== Cup Quarter-finals ===
Quarter-finals
Canada	35
Netherlands	14
Kazakhstan	12
China	7
United States	45
(Cooperation Council for the Arab States of the Gulf) Arabian Gulf	0
France	15
Japan	7

Semi-finals
Canada	26
Kazakhstan	0
United States	5
France	0

Cup Final
United States	21
Canada	7
Plate Final
France	24
Kazakhstan	0

=== Bowl Semi-finals ===
Semi-finals
China*	5
Netherlands	5
Japan	10
(Cooperation Council for the Arab States of the Gulf) Arabian Gulf	0

Bowl Final
China	17
Japan	7
7th Place
Netherlands	19
(Cooperation Council for the Arab States of the Gulf) Arabian Gulf	0

*China won on try countback

=== 9–12th Place Semi-finals ===
Semi-finals
Hong Kong	15
Singapore	0
Thailand	29
Papua New Guinea	0

9th Place
Hong Kong	15
Thailand	7
11th Place
Papua New Guinea	17
Singapore	5
