= 2011 ARFU Women's Sevens Championship =

- Host nation: India
- Date: 1–2 October 2011

Cup
- Champion: China
- Runner-up: Kazakhstan
- Third: Japan

Tournament details
- Matches played: 34

The 2011 ARFU Women's Sevens Championship was the twelfth edition of the tournament and was held from 1 to 2 October 2011 at Pune, India. China faced Kazakhstan in the Cup final and were successful in earning their fourth title win.

== Teams ==
Twelve teams competed at the tournament.

- China
- Chinese Taipei
- Hong Kong
- India
- Iran
- Japan
- Kazakhstan
- Laos
- Malaysia
- Singapore
- South Korea
- Thailand

== Pool Stage ==
=== Group A ===
Nation	Won	Drawn	Lost	For	Against
China	3	0	0	100	0
Singapore	2	0	1	46	38
Iran	1	0	2	17	67
Malaysia	0	0	3	7	79

China	24–0	Malaysia

Iran	0–12	Singapore

Singapore	0–38	China

Malaysia	7–17	Iran

China	38–0	Iran

Malaysia	0–34	Singapore

=== Group B ===
Nation	Won	Drawn	Lost	For	Against
Kazakhstan	3	0	0	89	7
Hong Kong	2	0	1	65	15
India	1	0	2	35	52
South Korea	0	0	3	0	115

Kazakhstan	37–0	India

Hong Kong	43–0	South Korea

Hong Kong	15–0	India

Kazakhstan	37–0	South Korea

South Korea	0–35	India

Kazakhstan	15–7	Hong Kong

=== Group C ===
Nation	Won	Drawn	Lost	For	Against
Thailand	3	0	0	60	10
Japan	2	0	1	82	29
Chinese Taipei	1	0	2	53	39
Laos	0	0	2	0	123

Thailand	10–7	Chinese Taipei

Japan	46–0	Laos

Thailand	43–0	Laos

Japan	29–12	Chinese Taipei

Thailand	17–7	Japan

Laos	0–34	Chinese Taipei

== Classification Stage ==
=== Cup Quarter-finals ===
Quarter-finals
China	41
India	0
Hong Kong	5
Japan	17
Thailand	24
Singapore	0
Kazakhstan	29
Chinese Taipei	0

Semi-finals
China	26
Japan	0
Kazakhstan	21
Thailand	12

Cup Final
China	31
Kazakhstan	12
3rd Place
Japan	17
Thailand	7

=== Plate Semi-finals ===
Semi-finals
India	0
Hong Kong	34
Chinese Taipei	21
Singapore	0

Plate Final
Hong Kong	24
Chinese Taipei	10
7th Place
Singapore	29
India	5

=== Bowl Semi-finals ===
Semi-finals
South Korea	17
Laos	12
Iran	12
Malaysia	0

Bowl Final
Iran	7
South Korea	5
11th Place
Laos	7
Malaysia	0
