= 2023 Asia Rugby Women's Sevens Series =

- Hosts: South Korea; Thailand
- Date: 26 August–15 October 2023
- Nations: 8

Final positions
- Champions: Japan
- Runners-up: China
- Third: Hong Kong

The 2023 Asia Rugby Women's Sevens Series was the twenty third edition of the series. It was played over two legs in South Korea and Thailand.

Japan won the series in a clean sweep and were undefeated in both rounds of competition.

== Teams ==
Eight teams featured in the series:

- China
- Hong Kong
- Japan
- Kazakhstan
- Malaysia
- Philippines
- Singapore
- Thailand

== Tour Venues ==
The official schedule for the 2023 Asia Rugby Women's Sevens Series is:

| Leg | Stadium | City | Dates | Winner |
|---|---|---|---|---|
| South Korea | Asiad Namdong Stadium | Incheon | 26–27 August 2023 | Japan |
| Thailand | Royal Thai Police Stadium | Bangkok | 14–15 October 2023 | Japan |

== Final standings ==
| Rank | Team | South Korea | Thailand | Points |
|---|---|---|---|---|
| 1st place, gold medalist(s) | Japan | 12 | 12 | 24 |
| 2nd place, silver medalist(s) | China | 10 | 8 | 18 |
| 3rd place, bronze medalist(s) | Hong Kong | 7 | 10 | 17 |
| 4 | Thailand | 8 | 7 | 15 |
| 5 | Kazakhstan | 5 | 5 | 10 |
| 6 | Singapore | 4 | 2 | 6 |
| 7 | Malaysia | 1 | 4 | 5 |
| 8 | Philippines | 2 | 1 | 3 |

== Tournaments ==
=== South Korea ===
The tournament was held 26–27 August in South Korea. All times in Korea Standard Time (UTC+09:00).

==== Pool Stage ====
Pool A

| Teams | Pld | W | D | L | PF | PA | +/− | Pts | |
|---|---|---|---|---|---|---|---|---|---|
| China | 3 | 3 | 0 | 0 | 89 | 12 | +77 | 9 | Advances to Cup |
| Hong Kong | 3 | 2 | 0 | 1 | 63 | 24 | +39 | 7 | Advances to Cup |
| Kazakhstan | 3 | 1 | 0 | 2 | 20 | 34 | –14 | 5 | Advances to Plate |
| Singapore | 3 | 0 | 0 | 3 | 0 | 102 | –102 | 3 | Advances to Plate |

| 26 August 2023 | Hong Kong | 17–0 | Kazakhstan | Asiad Namdong Stadium |
| 11:40 |

| 26 August 2023 | China | 48–0 | Singapore | Asiad Namdong Stadium |
| 12:05 |

| 26 August 2023 | Hong Kong | 39–0 | Singapore | Asiad Namdong Stadium |
| 15:00 |

| 26 August 2023 | China | 17–5 | Kazakhstan | Asiad Namdong Stadium |
| 15:25 |

| 26 August 2023 | Kazakhstan | 15–0 | Singapore | Asiad Namdong Stadium |
| 18:20 |

| 26 August 2023 | China | 24–7 | Hong Kong | Asiad Namdong Stadium |
| 18:45 |

Pool B

| Teams | Pld | W | D | L | PF | PA | +/− | Pts | |
|---|---|---|---|---|---|---|---|---|---|
| Japan | 3 | 3 | 0 | 0 | 135 | 19 | +116 | 9 | Advances to Cup |
| Thailand | 3 | 2 | 0 | 1 | 94 | 55 | +39 | 7 | Advances to Cup |
| Philippines | 3 | 1 | 0 | 2 | 41 | 94 | –53 | 5 | Advances to Plate |
| Malaysia | 3 | 0 | 0 | 3 | 27 | 129 | –102 | 3 | Advances to Plate |

| 26 August 2023 | Thailand | 36–12 | Philippines | Asiad Namdong Stadium |
| 12:30 |

| 26 August 2023 | Japan | 61–0 | Malaysia | Asiad Namdong Stadium |
| 12:55 |

| 26 August 2023 | Thailand | 46–10 | Malaysia | Asiad Namdong Stadium |
| 15:50 |

| 26 August 2023 | Japan | 41–7 | Philippines | Asiad Namdong Stadium |
| 16:15 |

| 26 August 2023 | Philippines | 22–17 | Malaysia | Asiad Namdong Stadium |
| 19:10 |

| 26 August 2023 | Japan | 33–12 | Thailand | Asiad Namdong Stadium |
| 19:35 |

==== Knockout Stage ====
Plate

Semi-finals
27 August, 10:00
Kazakhstan | 39
Malaysia | 0
27 August, 10:25
Singapore | 10
Philippines | 5

Plate Final
27 August, 13:45
Kazakhstan | 32
Singapore | 5
7th Place
27 August, 13:20
Philippines | 26
Malaysia | 10

Cup

Semi-finals
27 August, 10:50
China | 12
Thailand | 0
27 August, 11:15
Hong Kong | 7
Japan | 27

Cup Final
27 August, 15:50
Japan | 14
China | 12
3rd Place
27 August, 15:00
Thailand | 22
Hong Kong | 14

=== Thailand ===
The tournament was held 14–15 October in Thailand. All times in Thailand Standard Time (UTC+07:00).

==== Pool Stage ====
Pool A

| Teams | Pld | W | D | L | PF | PA | +/− | Pts | |
|---|---|---|---|---|---|---|---|---|---|
| Japan | 3 | 3 | 0 | 0 | 79 | 14 | +65 | 9 | Advances to Cup |
| Hong Kong | 3 | 2 | 0 | 1 | 77 | 32 | +45 | 7 | Advances to Cup |
| Kazakhstan | 3 | 1 | 0 | 2 | 29 | 57 | –28 | 5 | Advances to Plate |
| Malaysia | 3 | 0 | 0 | 3 | 10 | 92 | –82 | 3 | Advances to Plate |

| 14 October 2023 | Hong Kong | 31–5 | Kazakhstan | Royal Thai Police Stadium |
| 11:40 |

| 14 October 2023 | Japan | 36–0 | Malaysia | Royal Thai Police Stadium |
| 12:05 |

| 14 October 2023 | Hong Kong | 39–10 | Malaysia | Royal Thai Police Stadium |
| 15:40 |

| 14 October 2023 | Japan | 26–7 | Kazakhstan | Royal Thai Police Stadium |
| 16:05 |

| 14 October 2023 | Kazakhstan | 17–0 | Malaysia | Royal Thai Police Stadium |
| 19:00 |

| 14 October 2023 | Japan | 17–7 | Hong Kong | Royal Thai Police Stadium |
| 19:25 |

Pool B

| Teams | Pld | W | D | L | PF | PA | +/− | Pts | |
|---|---|---|---|---|---|---|---|---|---|
| China | 3 | 2 | 1 | 0 | 112 | 12 | +100 | 8 | Advances to Cup |
| Thailand | 3 | 2 | 1 | 0 | 87 | 12 | +75 | 8 | Advances to Cup |
| Singapore | 3 | 1 | 0 | 2 | 24 | 105 | –81 | 5 | Advances to Plate |
| Philippines | 3 | 0 | 0 | 3 | 5 | 99 | –94 | 3 | Advances to Plate |

| 14 October 2023 | Thailand | 43–0 | Singapore | Royal Thai Police Stadium |
| 12:30 |

| 14 October 2023 | China | 43–0 | Philippines | Royal Thai Police Stadium |
| 12:55 |

| 14 October 2023 | Thailand | 32–0 | Philippines | Royal Thai Police Stadium |
| 16:30 |

| 14 October 2023 | China | 57–0 | Singapore | Royal Thai Police Stadium |
| 16:55 |

| 14 October 2023 | Singapore | 24–5 | Philippines | Royal Thai Police Stadium |
| 19:50 |

| 14 October 2023 | China | 12–12 | Thailand | Royal Thai Police Stadium |
| 20:15 |

==== Knockout Stage ====
Plate

Semi-finals
15 October, 10:00
Kazakhstan | 34
Philippines | 0
15 October, 10:25
Malaysia | 24
Singapore | 15

Plate Final
15 October, 13:45
Kazakhstan | 26
Malaysia | 19
7th Place
15 October, 13:20
Singapore | 10
Philippines | 5

Cup

Semi-finals
15 October, 10:50
Japan | 14
Thailand | 5
15 October, 11:15
Hong Kong | 17
China | 14

Cup Final
15 October, 15:50
Japan | 29
Hong Kong | 5
3rd Place
15 October, 15:00
China | 19
Thailand | 0
