= 2000 Hong Kong Women's Sevens =

- Host nation: Hong Kong
- Date: March 22–24

Cup
- Champion: New Zealand
- Runner-up: Australia

Plate
- Winner: Kazakhstan
- Runner-up: Netherlands

Bowl
- Winner: Japan
- Runner-up: Singapore

Tournament details
- Matches played: 40

The 2000 Hong Kong Women's Sevens was the third edition of the tournament. It took place between the 22–24 March 2000. It also featured the first official appearance of the New Zealand women's team since the tournament began in 1997.

New Zealand beat Australia in the final to win the tournament.

== Tournament ==
Games involving the Arabian Gulf, Hong Kong, Japan, Kazakhstan, Singapore and Thailand comprised the 2000 Asian Women's Sevens championship.

=== Pool stages ===
Pool A

Nation	Won	Drawn	Lost	For	Against	Points
New Zealand	5	0	0	243	0	10
Samoa	4	0	1	125	60	8
Wales	2	1	2	101	75	5
Hong Kong	2	1	2	77	98	5
Thailand	1	0	4	17	171	2
(Cooperation Council for the Arab States of the Gulf) Arabian Gulf	0	0	5	15	174	0

- Samoa 31–0 Arabian Gulf
- New Zealand 41–0 Wales
- Hong Kong 31–0 Thailand (Asian Sevens)
- Samoa 22–10 Wales
- Thailand 17–10 Arabian Gulf (Asian Sevens)
- New Zealand 62–0 Hong Kong
- Wales 25–0 Thailand
- New Zealand 38–0 Samoa
- Hong Kong 22–5 Arabian Gulf (Asian Sevens)
- New Zealand 52–0 Thailand
- Samoa 19–12 Hong Kong
- Wales 54–0 Arabian Gulf
- Samoa 53–0 Thailand
- Wales 12–12 Hong Kong
- New Zealand 50–0 Arabian Gulf

Pool B

Nation	Won	Drawn	Lost	For	Against	Points
Australia	4	1	0	152	24	9
United States	4	1	0	135	7	9
Netherlands	3	0	2	70	97	6
Kazakhstan	2	0	3	63	41	4
Japan	1	0	4	63	114	2
Singapore	0	0	5	12	212	0

- Australia 56–0 Singapore
- USA 29–0 Netherlands
- Kazakhstan 19–5 Japan (Asian Sevens)
- Australia 48–7 Netherlands
- Kazakhstan 34–0 Singapore (Asian Sevens)
- USA 35–0 Japan
- Netherlands 10–5 Kazakhstan
- USA 7–7 Australia
- Japan 43–7 Singapore (Asian Sevens)
- USA 14–0 Kazakhstan
- Australia 29–5 Japan
- Netherlands 29–5 Singapore
- Australia 12–5 Kazakhstan
- Netherlands 24–10 Japan
- USA 50–0 Singapore

=== Classification Stages ===
Bowl

Semi-finals
Japan	46
(Cooperation Council for the Arab States of the Gulf) Arabian Gulf	0
Singapore	19
Thailand	0

Plate Final (Asian Sevens 3rd/4th)
Japan	55
Singapore	7

Plate

Semi-finals
Kazakhstan	46
Hong Kong	0
Netherlands	12
Wales	7

Plate Final
Kazakhstan	20
Netherlands	7

Cup

Semi-finals
Australia	26
Samoa	10
New Zealand	17
United States	10

Cup Final
New Zealand	36
Australia	10

=== Asian Cup Final ===
Believed to be an additional match called an Asian Final, based on group standings.

Kazakhstan	41–0	Hong Kong
