= 2013 Hong Kong Women's Sevens =

- Host nation: Hong Kong
- Date: 22 March

Cup
- Champion: Canada
- Runner-up: Australia

Plate
- Winner: South Africa
- Runner-up: Kazakhstan

Bowl
- Winner: Ireland
- Runner-up: International Select

Tournament details
- Matches played: 24

The 2013 Hong Kong Women's Sevens was the 16th edition of the tournament and was held on 22 March 2013. Canada were crowned champions after beating Australia in the final at the Hong Kong Stadium.

== Teams ==
Eleven international teams including hosts, Hong Kong, and an International Select side competed at the tournament.

- Australia
- Kazakhstan
- Canada
- Japan
- Hong Kong
- France
- South Africa
- Ireland
- Netherlands
- China
- South Africa
- International Select

== Tournament ==
=== Pool Stages ===
Pool A

Nation	Won	Drawn	Lost	For	Against
Australia	2	0	0	61	12
Kazakhstan	1	0	1	52	24
International Select	0	0	2	5	82

Australia	42–0	International Select

Kazakhstan	40–5	International Select

Australia	19–12	Kazakhstan

Pool B

Nation	Won	Drawn	Lost	For	Against
Canada	2	0	0	87	0
Japan	1	0	1	24	59
Hong Kong	0	0	2	5	57

Hong Kong	0–33	Canada

Hong Kong	5–24	Japan

Canada	54–0	Japan

Pool C

Nation	Won	Drawn	Lost	For	Against
France	2	0	0	43	14
South Africa	1	0	1	26	21
Ireland	0	0	2	21	38

South Africa	19–14	Ireland

France	19–7	Ireland

South Africa	7–24	France

Pool D

Nation	Won	Drawn	Lost	For	Against
Netherlands	2	0	0	97	10
China	1	0	1	60	31
Singapore	0	0	2	0	116

Netherlands	66–0	Singapore

China	50–0	Singapore

Netherlands	31–10	China

=== Classification stages ===
==== Bowl Finals ====
Semi-finals
International Select	36
Singapore	10
Ireland	33
Hong Kong	5

Bowl Final
Ireland	28
International Select	0
11th Place
Hong Kong	40
Singapore	5

==== Plate Finals ====
Semi-finals
Kazakhstan	17
China	15
South Africa	26
Japan	5

Plate Final
South Africa	26
Kazakhstan	5
7th Place
China	14
Japan	5

==== Cup Finals ====
Semi-finals
Australia	17
Netherlands	5
Canada	21
France	0

Cup Final
Canada	29
Australia	0
3rd Place
Netherlands	14
France	0
