= 2008 ARFU Women's Sevens Championship =

- Host nation: Qatar
- Date: 4−5 October 2008

Cup
- Champion: Japan
- Runner-up: Thailand
- Third: China

Tournament details
- Matches played: 17

The 2008 ARFU Women's Sevens Championship was the tournaments ninth edition and was held in Hong Kong on 4−5 October. The tournament also served as a regional qualifier for the first-ever Women's Rugby World Cup Sevens in 2009. Nine teams competed for the three allotted World Cup spots, finalists Japan and Thailand were joined by third-place China.

== Tournament ==
=== Pool Stage ===
Legend
Advances to Cup tournament
Advances to Plate tournament
Ninth Place

Pool A

Teams	Pld	W	D	L	PF	PA	+/−	Pts
Kazakhstan	2	2	0	0	30	5	+25	6
Hong Kong	2	1	0	1	17	15	+2	4
Singapore	2	0	0	2	5	32	–27	2

4 October 2008

Kazakhstan	20−0	Singapore

4 October 2008

Hong Kong	12−5	Singapore

4 October 2008

Kazakhstan	10−5	Hong Kong

Pool B

Teams	Pld	W	D	L	PF	PA	+/−	Pts
China	2	2	0	0	92	7	+85	6
(Cooperation Council for the Arab States of the Gulf) Arabian Gulf	2	1	0	1	34	69	–35	4
Sri Lanka	2	0	0	2	17	67	–50	2

4 October 2008

China	40−0	Sri Lanka

4 October 2008

Arabian Gulf (Cooperation Council for the Arab States of the Gulf)	27−17	Sri Lanka

4 October 2008

China	52−7	(Cooperation Council for the Arab States of the Gulf) Arabian Gulf

Pool C

Teams	Pld	W	D	L	PF	PA	+/−	Pts
Thailand	2	2	0	0	36	15	+21	6
Japan	2	1	0	1	37	12	+25	4
Chinese Taipei	2	0	0	2	5	51	–46	2

4 October 2008

Japan	27−0	Chinese Taipei

4 October 2008

Thailand	24−5	Chinese Taipei

4 October 2008

Japan	10−12	Thailand

=== Playoff ===
Plate

Semi-finals
5 October 2008
Hong Kong	31
Chinese Taipei	0
5 October 2008
Singapore	7
(Cooperation Council for the Arab States of the Gulf) Arabian Gulf	17

Final
5 October 2008
Hong Kong	12
(Cooperation Council for the Arab States of the Gulf) Arabian Gulf	0
Seventh Place
5 October 2008
Chinese Taipei	5
Singapore	29

Cup

Semi-finals
5 October 2008
Kazakhstan	0
Japan	5
5 October 2008
China	7
Thailand	14

Final
5 October 2008
Japan	17
Thailand	12
Third Place/Qualifier
5 October 2008
Kazakhstan	5
China	17
