= 2009 Hong Kong Women's Sevens =

- Host nation: Hong Kong
- Date: 27 March

Cup
- Champion: Australia
- Runner-up: China

Plate
- Winner: Thailand
- Runner-up: Tunisia

Bowl
- Winner: Papua New Guinea
- Runner-up: (Cooperation Council for the Arab States of the Gulf) Arabian Gulf

Tournament details
- Matches played: 28

The 2009 Hong Kong Women's Sevens was the 12th edition of the tournament and took place on 27 March. World champions, Australia, won the tournament after defeating China in the final, they were undefeated and conceded only one try.

== Teams ==
Ten teams competed at the tournament.

- (Cooperation Council for the Arab States of the Gulf) Arabian Gulf
- Australia
- China
- Guam
- Hong Kong
- Japan U-23
- Papua New Guinea
- Singapore
- Thailand
- Tunisia

== Group Stages ==
=== Pool A ===
Nation	Won	Drawn	Lost	For	Against
China	4	0	0	122	7
Thailand	3	0	1	87	36
Papua New Guinea	1	0	3	29	70
Japan U-23	1	0	3	25	81
Hong Kong	1	0	3	17	86

27 March

Thailand	12–0	Papua New Guinea

Hong Kong

27 March

Hong Kong	5–15	Japan U-23

Hong Kong

27 March

China	36–0	Papua New Guinea

Hong Kong

27 March

Japan U-23	0–33	Thailand

Hong Kong

27 March

Hong Kong	0–29	China

Hong Kong

27 March

Japan U-23	10–22	Papua New Guinea

Hong Kong

27 March

China	36–7	Thailand

Hong Kong

27 March

Papua New Guinea	7–12	Hong Kong

Hong Kong

27 March

China	21–0	Japan U-23

Hong Kong

27 March

Thailand	35–0	Hong Kong

Hong Kong

=== Pool B ===
Nation	Won	Drawn	Lost	For	Against
Australia	4	0	0	177	0
Tunisia	3	0	1	59	60
(Cooperation Council for the Arab States of the Gulf) Arabian Gulf	2	0	2	73	57
Singapore	0	1	3	24	108
Guam	0	1	3	19	127

27 March

Guam	7–26	Tunisia

Hong Kong

27 March

Singapore	0–29	(Cooperation Council for the Arab States of the Gulf) Arabian Gulf

Hong Kong

27 March

Australia	29–0	Tunisia

Hong Kong

27 March

Arabian Gulf (Cooperation Council for the Arab States of the Gulf)	32–0	Guam

Hong Kong

27 March

Singapore	0–53	Australia

Hong Kong

27 March

Tunisia	19–12	(Cooperation Council for the Arab States of the Gulf) Arabian Gulf

Hong Kong

27 March

Australia	57–0	Guam

Hong Kong

27 March

Tunisia	14–12	Singapore

Hong Kong

27 March

Guam	12–12	Singapore

Hong Kong

27 March

Australia	38–0	(Cooperation Council for the Arab States of the Gulf) Arabian Gulf

Hong Kong

== Classification Games ==
=== 9th place ===
27 March

Hong Kong	7–0	Guam

Hong Kong

=== 7th place ===
27 March

Japan U-23	7–0	Singapore

Hong Kong

=== Bowl Final ===
27 March

Arabian Gulf (Cooperation Council for the Arab States of the Gulf)	12–14	Papua New Guinea

Hong Kong

=== Plate Final ===
27 March

Thailand	22–7	Tunisia

Hong Kong

=== Cup Final ===
27 March

Australia	24–7	China

Hong Kong
