= 2005 ARFU Women's Sevens Championship =

- Host nation: Singapore
- Date: 15–16 April 2005

Cup
- Champion: Kazakhstan
- Runner-up: Japan

Plate
- Winner: China
- Runner-up: Thailand

Tournament details
- Matches played: 25

The 2005 ARFU Women's Sevens Championship was the sixth edition of the tournament. It was held in Singapore from 15 to 16 April 2005.

== Tournament ==
=== Pool Stage ===
==== Pool A ====
Nation	Won	Drawn	Lost	For	Against
Kazakhstan	4	0	0	123	0
Japan	3	0	1	70	57
China	2	0	2	57	46
Thailand	1	0	3	45	49
(Cooperation Council for the Arab States of the Gulf) Arabian Gulf	0	0	4	12	155

15 April 2005

Kazakhstan	31–0	Japan

15 April 2005

Japan	10–7	Thailand

15 April 2005

China	31–0	(Cooperation Council for the Arab States of the Gulf) Arabian Gulf

15 April 2005

China	14–7	Thailand

15 April 2005

Thailand	31–5	(Cooperation Council for the Arab States of the Gulf) Arabian Gulf

15 April 2005

Kazakhstan	17–0	China

15 April 2005

Japan	38–7	(Cooperation Council for the Arab States of the Gulf) Arabian Gulf

15 April 2005

Kazakhstan	20–0	Thailand

15 April 2005

Japan	22–12	China

15 April 2005

Kazakhstan	55–0	(Cooperation Council for the Arab States of the Gulf) Arabian Gulf

==== Pool B ====
Nation	Won	Drawn	Lost	For	Against
Singapore	3	0	0	43	10
Hong Kong	2	0	1	42	35
Sri Lanka	1	0	2	45	17
Uzbekistan	0	0	3	7	75

15 April 2005

Sri Lanka	33–0	Uzbekistan

15 April 2005

Singapore	21–5	Hong Kong

15 April 2005

Singapore	7–5	Sri Lanka

15 April 2005

Hong Kong	27–7	Uzbekistan

15 April 2005

Hong Kong	10–7	Sri Lanka

15 April 2005

Singapore	15–0	Uzbekistan

=== Finals ===
==== Cup Semi-finals ====
Semi-finals
16 April 2005
Japan	21
Singapore	5
16 April 2005
Kazakhstan	39
Hong Kong	0

Cup Final
16 April 2005
Kazakhstan	24
Japan	5

==== Plate Semi-finals ====
Semi-finals
16 April 2005
Thailand	24
Sri Lanka	0
16 April 2005
China	45
Uzbekistan	0

Plate Final
16 April 2005
China	26
Thailand	5

==== Second Round ====
Nation	Won	Drawn	Lost	For	Against
Sri Lanka	2	0	0	45	19
(Cooperation Council for the Arab States of the Gulf) Arabian Gulf	1	0	1	47	21
Uzbekistan	0	0	2	0	52

16 April 2005

Sri Lanka	24–0	Uzbekistan

16 April 2005

Sri Lanka	21–19	(Cooperation Council for the Arab States of the Gulf) Arabian Gulf

16 April 2005

Arabian Gulf (Cooperation Council for the Arab States of the Gulf)	28–0	Uzbekistan
