= 2019 Asia Rugby Women's Sevens Series =

- Hosts: South Korea; China; Sri Lanka
- Date: 31 August – 29 September 2019
- Nations: China; Hong Kong; Japan; Kazakhstan; Malaysia; Singapore; Sri Lanka; Thailand

Final positions
- Champions: Japan
- Runners-up: China
- Third: Kazakhstan

The 2019 Asia Rugby Women's Sevens Series was the twentieth edition of Asia's continental sevens tournament. The series was played over three legs in South Korea, China, and Sri Lanka.

The top three teams earned qualification to the 2020–21 World Series Qualifier for a chance to earn core team status for the following World Series.

== Teams ==
The eight "core teams" qualified to participate in all series events for 2019 are:

- China
- Hong Kong
- Japan
- Kazakhstan
- Malaysia
- Singapore
- Sri Lanka
- Thailand

Malaysia was promoted to core team status after winning the 2018 Sevens Trophy in Singapore, replacing South Korea who were relegated after finishing as the lowest-placed core team in 2018.

== Tour venues ==
The official schedule for the 2019 Asia Rugby Women's Sevens Series is:

2019 Sevens Series Venues
Leg	Stadium	City	Dates	Winner
South Korea	Namdong Asiad Rugby Field	Incheon	31 August – 1 September 2019	Japan
China	Huizhou Olympic Stadium	Huizhou	14–15 September 2019	Japan
Sri Lanka	Racecourse Stadium	Colombo	28–29 September 2019	Japan

== Final standings ==
Legend
Qualified to World Series Qualifiers
Relegated for 2020 Series

Rank	Team	South Korea	China	Sri Lanka	Points
1st place, gold medalist(s)	Japan	12	12	12	36
2nd place, silver medalist(s)	China	10	10	8	28
3rd place, bronze medalist(s)	Kazakhstan	7	8	7	22
4	Thailand	4	4	10	18
5	Hong Kong	8	7	4	19
6	Sri Lanka	3	1	2	6
7	Malaysia	2	3	1	6
8	Singapore	1	2	3	6

== Tournaments ==
=== South Korea ===
The tournament was held 31 August – 1 September in South Korea. All times in Korea Standard Time (UTC+09:00).

==== Pool stage ====
Legend
Advances to Cup
Advances to Plate

Pool C

Teams	Pld	W	D	L	PF	PA	+/−	Pts
Japan	3	3	0	0	120	12	+108	9
Hong Kong	3	2	0	1	73	46	+27	7
Sri Lanka	3	1	0	2	52	74	–22	5
Malaysia	3	0	0	3	7	120	–113	3

31 August 2019
13:14

Hong Kong	33–10	Sri Lanka

Namdong Asiad Rugby Field

31 August 2019
13:36

Japan	50–0	Malaysia

Namdong Asiad Rugby Field

31 August 2019
16:10

Sri Lanka	35–7	Malaysia

Namdong Asiad Rugby Field

31 August 2019
16:32

Japan	36–5	Hong Kong

Namdong Asiad Rugby Field

1 September 2019
10:44

Hong Kong	35–0	Malaysia

Namdong Asiad Rugby Field

1 September 2019
11:06

Japan	34–7	Sri Lanka

Namdong Asiad Rugby Field

Pool D

Teams	Pld	W	D	L	PF	PA	+/−	Pts
China	3	3	0	0	104	15	+89	9
Kazakhstan	3	2	0	1	53	19	+34	7
Thailand	3	1	0	2	41	36	+5	5
Singapore	3	0	0	3	0	128	–128	3

31 August 2019
12:30

Kazakhstan	12–0	Thailand

Namdong Asiad Rugby Field

31 August 2019
12:52

China	61–0	Singapore

Namdong Asiad Rugby Field

31 August 2019
15:26

Thailand	41–0	Singapore

Namdong Asiad Rugby Field

31 August 2019
15:48

China	21–14	Kazakhstan

Namdong Asiad Rugby Field

1 September 2019
10:00

Kazakhstan	26–0	Singapore

Namdong Asiad Rugby Field

1 September 2019
10:22

China	24–0	Thailand

Namdong Asiad Rugby Field

==== Knockout stage ====
Plate

Semi-finals
15 September – 12:56 – Namdong Asiad Rugby Field
Thailand	36
Malaysia	10
15 September – 13:18 – Namdong Asiad Rugby Field
Singapore	5
Sri Lanka	26

Plate Final
15 September – 16:28 – Namdong Asiad Rugby Field
Thailand	32
Sri Lanka	5
Seventh place
15 September – 16:06 – Namdong Asiad Rugby Field
Malaysia	7
Singapore	0

Cup

Semi-finals
15 September – 13:40 – Namdong Asiad Rugby Field
China	19
Hong Kong	7
15 September – 14:02 – Namdong Asiad Rugby Field
Kazakhstan	5
Japan	22

Cup Final
15 September – 18:18 – Namdong Asiad Rugby Field
China	5
Japan	19
Third place
15 September – 17:34 – Namdong Asiad Rugby Field
Hong Kong	17
Kazakhstan	10

=== China ===
The tournament was held 14–15 September in Huizhou. All times in China Standard Time (UTC+08:00).

==== Pool stage ====
Legend
Advances to Cup
Advances to Plate

Pool C

Teams	Pld	W	D	L	PF	PA	+/−	Pts
Japan	3	2	0	1	93	19	+74	7
Kazakhstan	3	2	0	1	71	24	+47	7
Thailand	3	2	0	1	45	32	+13	7
Singapore	3	0	0	3	0	134	–134	3

14 September 2019
13:14

Kazakhstan	5–12	Thailand

Huizhou Olympic Stadium

14 September 2019
13:36

Japan	54–0	Singapore

Huizhou Olympic Stadium

14 September 2019
16:10

Thailand	33–0	Singapore

Huizhou Olympic Stadium

14 September 2019
16:32

Japan	12–19	Kazakhstan

Huizhou Olympic Stadium

15 September 2019
10:44

Kazakhstan	47–0	Singapore

Huizhou Olympic Stadium

15 September 2019
11:06

Japan	27–0	Thailand

Huizhou Olympic Stadium

Pool D

Teams	Pld	W	D	L	PF	PA	+/−	Pts
China	3	3	0	0	147	0	+147	9
Hong Kong	3	2	0	1	53	52	+1	7
Malaysia	3	1	0	2	20	92	–72	5
Sri Lanka	3	0	0	3	12	88	–76	3

14 September 2019
12:30

Hong Kong	22–7	Sri Lanka

Huizhou Olympic Stadium

14 September 2019
12:52

China	56–0	Malaysia

Huizhou Olympic Stadium

14 September 2019
15:26

Sri Lanka	5–20	Malaysia

Huizhou Olympic Stadium

14 September 2019
15:48

China	45–0	Hong Kong

Huizhou Olympic Stadium

15 September 2019
10:00

Hong Kong	31–0	Malaysia

Huizhou Olympic Stadium

15 September 2019
10:22

China	46–0	Sri Lanka

Huizhou Olympic Stadium

==== Knockout stage ====
Plate

Semi-finals
30 September – 12:56 – Huizhou Olympic Stadium
Malaysia	19
Singapore	5
30 September – 13:18 – Huizhou Olympic Stadium
Thailand	31
Sri Lanka	5

Plate Final
30 September – 16:28 – Huizhou Olympic Stadium
Malaysia	0
Thailand	36
Seventh place
30 September – 16:06 – Huizhou Olympic Stadium
Singapore	15
Sri Lanka	10

Cup

Semi-finals
30 September – 13:40 – Huizhou Olympic Stadium
China	21
Kazakhstan	10
30 September – 14:02 – Huizhou Olympic Stadium
Japan	33
Hong Kong	12

Cup Final
30 September – 18:18 – Huizhou Olympic Stadium
China	17
Japan	22
Third place
30 September – 17:34 – Huizhou Olympic Stadium
Kazakhstan	19
Hong Kong	17

=== Sri Lanka ===
The tournament was held 28–29 September in Colombo. All times in Sri Lanka Standard Time (UTC+05:30).

==== Pool stage ====
Legend
Advances to Cup
Advances to Plate

Pool C

Teams	Pld	W	D	L	PF	PA	+/−	Pts
Japan	3	3	0	0	89	0	+89	9
Thailand	3	2	0	1	58	41	+17	7
Hong Kong	3	1	0	2	27	56	−29	5
Sri Lanka	3	0	0	3	15	92	−77	3

28 September 2019
14:14

Hong Kong	5−22	Thailand

Racecourse Stadium

28 September 2019
14:36

Japan	34−0	Sri Lanka

Racecourse Stadium

28 September 2019
17:20

Thailand	36−5	Sri Lanka

Racecourse Stadium

28 September 2019
17:42

Japan	24−0	Hong Kong

Racecourse Stadium

29 September 2019
10:44

Hong Kong	22−10	Sri Lanka

Racecourse Stadium

29 September 2019
11:06

Japan	31−0	Thailand

Racecourse Stadium

Pool D

Teams	Pld	W	D	L	PF	PA	+/−	Pts
Kazakhstan	3	3	0	0	119	17	+102	9
China	3	2	0	1	121	19	+102	7
Singapore	3	1	0	2	10	114	−104	5
Malaysia	3	0	0	3	5	105	−100	3

28 September 2019
13:30

Kazakhstan	52−0	Malaysia

Racecourse Stadium

28 September 2019
13:52

China	61−0	Singapore

Racecourse Stadium

28 September 2019
16:36

Malaysia	5−10	Singapore

Racecourse Stadium

28 September 2019
16:58

China	17−19	Kazakhstan

Racecourse Stadium

29 September 2019
10:00

Kazakhstan	48−0	Singapore

Racecourse Stadium

29 September 2019
10:22

China	43−0	Malaysia

Racecourse Stadium

==== Knockout stage ====
Plate

Semi-finals
14 October – 12:56 – Racecourse Stadium
Sri Lanka	0
Singapore	29
14 October – 13:18 – Racecourse Stadium
Malaysia	10
Hong Kong	22

Plate Final
14 October – 16:28 – Racecourse Stadium
Singapore	5
Hong Kong	22
Seventh place
14 October – 16:06 – Racecourse Stadium
Sri Lanka	17
Malaysia	7

Cup

Semi-finals
14 October – 13:40 – Racecourse Stadium
Thailand	12
Kazakhstan	7
14 October – 14:02 – Racecourse Stadium
China	14
Japan	22

Cup Final
14 October – 18:28 – Racecourse Stadium
Thailand	5
Japan	26
Third place
14 October – 17:34 – Racecourse Stadium
Kazakhstan	0
China	31

== Sevens Trophy ==
The Sevens Trophy tournament acts as a qualifier for the 2020 main series.

=== Teams ===
The nine teams participating in the 2019 tournament are:

- Bangladesh
- Chinese Taipei
- Guam
- India
- Indonesia
- Laos
- Philippines
- Qatar
- South Korea

South Korea were relegated after finishing as the lowest-placed team in 2018 main series, replacing the 2018 Sevens Trophy winners Malaysia.

=== Venue ===
2019 Sevens Series Venues
Leg	Stadium	City	Dates	Winner
Indonesia	GBK Sports Complex	Jakarta	10–11 August 2019	Philippines

=== Final standings ===
Legend
Promoted to the 2020 main series

Rank	Team
1st place, gold medalist(s)	Philippines
2nd place, silver medalist(s)	India
3rd place, bronze medalist(s)	Indonesia
4	South Korea
5	Guam
6	Laos
7	Qatar
8	Chinese Taipei
9	Bangladesh

== See also ==
- 2019 Asia Rugby Sevens Series
- 2020 Hong Kong Women's Sevens
