= 2006 ARFU Women's Sevens Championship =

- Host nation: Uzbekistan
- Date: 15–16 May 2006

Cup
- Champion: China
- Runner-up: Kazakhstan

Plate
- Winner: Japan
- Runner-up: Thailand

Tournament details
- Matches played: 29

The 2006 ARFU Women's Sevens Championship was the tournaments seventh edition and was held in Tashkent, Uzbekistan from 15 to 16 May 2006.

China defeated Kazakhstan in the Cup final to claim their first title.

== Teams ==
Nine teams competed in the tournament.

- Kazakhstan
- Singapore
- Kyrgyzstan
- Hong Kong
- Uzbekistan
- Japan
- China
- Thailand
- (Cooperation Council for the Arab States of the Gulf) Arabian Gulf

== Pool Stage ==
=== Round 1 ===
==== Pool A ====
Nation	Won	Drawn	Lost	For	Against
Kazakhstan	2	0	0	80	0
Singapore	1	0	1	?	?
Kyrgyzstan	0	0	2	?	?

15 May 2006

Kazakhstan	37–0	Singapore

15 May 2006

Singapore	beat	Kyrgyzstan

15 May 2006

Kazakhstan	43–0	Kyrgyzstan

==== Pool B ====
Nation	Won	Drawn	Lost	For	Against
Hong Kong	2	0	0	26	20
Uzbekistan	1	0	1	17	19
Japan	0	0	2	15	19

15 May 2006

Hong Kong	12–10	Japan

15 May 2006

Uzbekistan	7–5	Japan

15 May 2006

Hong Kong	14–10	Uzbekistan

==== Pool C ====
Nation	Won	Drawn	Lost	For	Against
China	2	0	0	55	0
Thailand	1	0	1	?	?
(Cooperation Council for the Arab States of the Gulf) Arabian Gulf	0	0	2	?	?

15 May 2006

China	24–0	Thailand

15 May 2006

Thailand	beat	(Cooperation Council for the Arab States of the Gulf) Arabian Gulf

15 May 2006

China	31–0	(Cooperation Council for the Arab States of the Gulf) Arabian Gulf

=== Round 2 ===
==== Pool D ====
Nation	Won	Drawn	Lost	For	Against
China	2	0	0	48	0
Hong Kong	1	0	1	15	26
Singapore	0	0	2	14	51

15 May 2006

China	36–0	Singapore

15 May 2006

Hong Kong	15–14	Singapore

15 May 2006

China	12–0	Hong Kong

==== Pool E ====
Nation	Won	Drawn	Lost	For	Against
Kazakhstan	2	0	0	79	0
Uzbekistan	1	0	1	?	?
Thailand	0	0	2	?	?

15 May 2006

Kazakhstan	48–0	Thailand

15 May 2006

Uzbekistan	N/A	Thailand

15 May 2006

Uzbekistan	0–31	Kazakhstan

==== Pool F ====
Nation	Won	Drawn	Lost	For	Against
Japan	2	0	0	60	0
(Cooperation Council for the Arab States of the Gulf) Arabian Gulf	1	0	1	?	?
Kyrgyzstan	0	0	2	?	?

15 May 2006

Japan	29–0	(Cooperation Council for the Arab States of the Gulf) Arabian Gulf

15 May 2006

Arabian Gulf (Cooperation Council for the Arab States of the Gulf)	N/A	Kyrgyzstan

15 May 2006

Japan	31–0	Kyrgyzstan

== Classification Stages ==
=== Plate competition ===
Nation	Won	Drawn	Lost	For	Against
Japan	2	1	0	60	14
Thailand	?	1	?	14	?
(Cooperation Council for the Arab States of the Gulf) Arabian Gulf	?	?	1	0	?
Singapore	?	?	1	5	?

16 May 2006

Japan	14–14	Thailand

16 May 2006

Singapore	N/A	(Cooperation Council for the Arab States of the Gulf) Arabian Gulf

16 May 2006

Japan	40–0	(Cooperation Council for the Arab States of the Gulf) Arabian Gulf

16 May 2006

Thailand	N/A	Singapore

16 May 2006

Japan	26–5	Singapore

16 May 2006

Thailand	N/A	(Cooperation Council for the Arab States of the Gulf) Arabian Gulf

=== Plate final (5th place overall) ===
Japan	19–7	Thailand

=== Cup Semi-finals ===
Semi-finals
Hong Kong	0
Kazakhstan	38
Uzbekistan	0
China	34

Cup Final
China	22
Kazakhstan	12
3rd Place
Hong Kong	5
Uzbekistan	0
