= 2014 ARFU Women's Sevens Series =

2014 Women's Sevens Series
- Hosts: Hong Kong; China
- Date: 22–23 August & 18–19 October
- Nations: 8

Final positions
- Champions: China
- Runners-up: Japan
- Third: Hong Kong

The 2014 ARFU Women's Sevens Series is the 15th edition of Asia's continental sevens tournament for women. It was played over two legs hosted in Hong Kong and Beijing, China. China's earlier win in Hong Kong and their runners-up position in Beijing earned them the crow of Asian Sevens champions of 2014, with Japan as runners-up and Hong Kong in third place.

== Tournaments ==
=== Hong Kong ===
The first leg of the tournament was held from 22 to 23 August 2014 at Shek Kip Mei Park, Hong Kong.

==== Pool stages ====
Pool W

Nation	Won	Drawn	Lost	For	Against
Japan	3	0	0	105	5
Kazakhstan	2	0	1	82	5
Singapore	1	0	2	19	72
Philippines	0	0	3	0	96

Kazakhstan	29-0	Singapore

Japan	43-0	Philippines

Kazakhstan	34-0	Philippines

Japan	43-0	Singapore

Singapore	19-0	Philippines

Japan	19-5	Kazakhstan

Pool X

Nation	Won	Drawn	Lost	For	Against
China	2	0	0	104	12
Hong Kong	1	1	1	46	43
Thailand	1	1	1	36	47
Sri Lanka	0	0	3	0	84

Hong Kong	22-0	Sri Lanka

China	35-0	Thailand

Hong Kong	12-12	Thailand

China	38-0	Sri Lanka

Thailand	24-0	Sri Lanka

China	31-12	Hong Kong

==== Knockout stages ====
Plate

Semi-finals
Sri Lanka	26
Singapore	10
Thailand	49
Philippines	0

5th-place final
Sri Lanka	19
Thailand	14
7th Place
Singapore	28
Philippines	10

Cup

Semi-finals
Hong Kong	10
Japan	5
China	19
Kazakhstan	12

Cup Final
China	38
Hong Kong	7
3rd Place
Japan	19
Kazakhstan	5

=== China ===
The second and last leg was held from 18 to 19 October 2014 at Beijing, China

==== Pool stages ====
Pool W

Nation	Won	Drawn	Lost	For	Against
Japan	3	0	0	89	7
China	2	0	1	91	12
Thailand	1	0	2	36	68
Philippines	0	0	3	0	129

Japan	32 - 0	Thailand

China	48 - 0	Philippines

Japan	45 - 0	Philippines

China	36 - 0	Thailand

Thailand	36 - 0	Philippines

China	7 - 12	Japan

Pool X

Nation	Won	Drawn	Lost	For	Against
Kazakhstan	3	0	0	85	12
Hong Kong	2	0	1	60	26
Sri Lanka	1	0	2	22	60
Singapore	0	0	3	14	83

Kazakhstan	22 - 0	Sri Lanka

Hong Kong	24 - 0	Singapore

Kazakhstan	44 - 0	Singapore

Hong Kong	24 - 7	Sri Lanka

Sri Lanka	15 - 14	Singapore

Hong Kong	12 - 19	Kazakhstan

==== Knockout stages ====
Plate

Semi-finals
Thailand	22
Singapore	0
Sri Lanka	42
Philippines	0

5th-place final
Thailand	25
Sri Lanka	5
7th Place
Singapore	24
Philippines	12

Cup

Semi-finals
Japan	17
Hong Kong	0
China	17
Kazakhstan	14

Cup Final
Japan	24
China	19
3rd Place
Hong Kong	14
Kazakhstan	12

== Final standings ==
#	Teams
1st place, gold medalist(s)	China
2nd place, silver medalist(s)	Japan
3rd place, bronze medalist(s)	Hong Kong
4.	Kazakhstan
5.	Thailand
6.	Sri Lanka
7.	Singapore
8.	Philippines
