= 2024 Asia Rugby Women's Sevens Series =

- Hosts: South Korea; China; Thailand
- Date: 7 September–10 November 2024
- Nations: 8

Final positions
- Champions: China
- Runners-up: Japan
- Third: Hong Kong

The 2024 Asia Rugby Women's Sevens Series is the twenty fourth edition of the series. It is played over three legs in South Korea, China and Thailand.

== Teams ==
Eight teams will feature in the series:

- China
- Hong Kong
- Japan
- Kazakhstan
- Malaysia
- Singapore
- Thailand
- United Arab Emirates

== Tour venues ==
The official schedule for the 2024 Asia Rugby Sevens Series is:

| Leg | Stadium | City | Dates | Winner |
|---|---|---|---|---|
| South Korea | Namdong Asiad Rugby Stadium | Incheon | 7–8 September 2024 | China |
| China | Hangzhou Normal University | Hangzhou | 21–22 September 2024 | China |
| Thailand | Boonyachinda Stadium | Bangkok | 9–10 November 2024 | Japan |

== Standings ==
2024 Asia Rugby Sevens Series
| Pos | Event Team | Incheon | Hangzhou | Bangkok | Points total |
|---|---|---|---|---|---|
| 1 | China | 12 | 12 | 10 | 34 |
| 2 | Japan | 8 | 10 | 12 | 30 |
| 3 | Hong Kong | 10 | 7 | 8 | 25 |
| 4 | Thailand | 7 | 8 | 7 | 22 |
| 5 | Kazakhstan | 5 | 5 | 5 | 15 |
| 6 | Malaysia | 2 | 2 | 4 | 8 |
| 7 | United Arab Emirates | 4 | 1 | 2 | 7 |
| 8 | Singapore | 1 | 4 | 1 | 6 |

Legend
| Green fill | Core team for the 2024–25 SVNS |
| Blue fill | Entry to World Challenger Series |
| Red fill | Relegated to 2025 Trophy |

== Incheon ==
=== Pool C ===
| Team | W | D | L | PF | PA | PD | Pts |
|---|---|---|---|---|---|---|---|
| Japan | 3 | 0 | 0 | 107 | 5 | +102 | 9 |
| Thailand | 2 | 0 | 1 | 49 | 28 | +21 | 7 |
| Kazakhstan | 1 | 0 | 2 | 29 | 65 | –36 | 5 |
| United Arab Emirates | 0 | 0 | 3 | 12 | 99 | –87 | 3 |

7 September
11:40

| Thailand | 15–0 | Kazakhstan |

Namdong Asiad Rugby Stadium, Incheon

7 September
12:05

| Japan | 41–0 | United Arab Emirates |

Namdong Asiad Rugby Stadium, Incheon

7 September
15:00

| Thailand | 29–0 | United Arab Emirates |

Namdong Asiad Rugby Stadium, Incheon

7 September
15:25

| Japan | 38–0 | Kazakhstan |

Namdong Asiad Rugby Stadium, Incheon

7 September
18:20

| Kazakhstan | 29–12 | United Arab Emirates |

Namdong Asiad Rugby Stadium, Incheon

7 September
18:45

| Japan | 28–5 | Thailand |

Namdong Asiad Rugby Stadium, Incheon

=== Pool D ===
| Team | W | D | L | PF | PA | PD | Pts |
|---|---|---|---|---|---|---|---|
| China | 3 | 0 | 0 | 87 | 7 | +89 | 9 |
| Hong Kong | 2 | 0 | 1 | 45 | 34 | +11 | 7 |
| Malaysia | 1 | 0 | 2 | 37 | 46 | –9 | 5 |
| Singapore | 0 | 0 | 3 | 5 | 87 | –82 | 3 |

7 September
12:30

| Hong Kong | 21–5 | Singapore |

Namdong Asiad Rugby Stadium, Incheon

7 September
12:55

| China | 29–0 | Malaysia |

Namdong Asiad Rugby Stadium, Incheon

7 September
15:50

| Hong Kong | 17–15 | Malaysia |

Namdong Asiad Rugby Stadium, Incheon

7 September
16:15

| China | 44–0 | Singapore |

Namdong Asiad Rugby Stadium, Incheon

7 September
19:10

| Singapore | 0–22 | Malaysia |

Namdong Asiad Rugby Stadium, Incheon

7 September
19:35

| China | 14–7 | Hong Kong |

Namdong Asiad Rugby Stadium, Incheon

=== Plate ===
Plate semifinals
8 September – 11:40
Kazakhstan | 31
Singapore | 0
8 September – 12:05
United Arab Emirates | 17
Malaysia | 7

Plate final
8 September – 14:35
Kazakhstan | 19
United Arab Emirates | 0
7th place final
8 September – 14:10
Singapore | 7
Malaysia | 15

=== Cup ===
Cup semifinals
8 September – 12:30
Japan | 7
Hong Kong | 12
8 September – 12:55
Thailand | 14
China | 19

Cup final
8 September – 16:15
Hong Kong | 0
China | 26
3rd place final
8 September – 15:25
Japan | 21
Thailand | 19

== Hangzhou ==
=== Pool C ===
| Team | W | D | L | PF | PA | PD | Pts |
|---|---|---|---|---|---|---|---|
| China | 3 | 0 | 0 | 117 | 10 | +107 | 9 |
| Thailand | 2 | 0 | 1 | 41 | 43 | –2 | 7 |
| Kazakhstan | 1 | 0 | 2 | 50 | 47 | +3 | 5 |
| Singapore | 0 | 0 | 3 | 12 | 120 | –108 | 3 |

21 September
11:40

| Thailand | 12–0 | Kazakhstan |

Hangzhou Normal University, Hangzhou

21 September
12:05

| China | 51–0 | Singapore |

Hangzhou Normal University, Hangzhou

21 September
15:00

| Thailand | 24–12 | Singapore |

Hangzhou Normal University, Hangzhou

21 September
15:25

| China | 35–5 | Kazakhstan |

Hangzhou Normal University, Hangzhou

21 September
18:20

| Kazakhstan | 45–0 | Singapore |

Hangzhou Normal University, Hangzhou

21 September
18:45

| China | 31–5 | Thailand |

Hangzhou Normal University, Hangzhou

=== Pool D ===
| Team | W | D | L | PF | PA | PD | Pts |
|---|---|---|---|---|---|---|---|
| Japan | 3 | 0 | 0 | 156 | 0 | +156 | 9 |
| Hong Kong | 2 | 0 | 1 | 58 | 58 | 0 | 7 |
| Malaysia | 1 | 0 | 2 | 22 | 94 | –72 | 5 |
| United Arab Emirates | 0 | 0 | 3 | 10 | 94 | –84 | 3 |

21 September
12:30

| Japan | 48–0 | United Arab Emirates |

Hangzhou Normal University, Hangzhou

21 September
12:55

| Hong Kong | 29–5 | Malaysia |

Hangzhou Normal University, Hangzhou

21 September
15:50

| Japan | 60–0 | Malaysia |

Hangzhou Normal University, Hangzhou

21 September
16:15

| Hong Kong | 29–5 | United Arab Emirates |

Hangzhou Normal University, Hangzhou

21 September
19:10

| United Arab Emirates | 5–17 | Malaysia |

Hangzhou Normal University, Hangzhou

21 September
19:35

| Hong Kong | 0–48 | Japan |

Hangzhou Normal University, Hangzhou

=== Plate ===
Plate semifinals
22 September – 11:40
Kazakhstan | 26
United Arab Emirates | 0
22 September – 12:05
Singapore | 12
Malaysia | 5

Plate final
22 September – 14:35
Kazakhstan | 36
Singapore | 0
7th place final
22 September – 14:10
United Arab Emirates | 17
Malaysia | 24

=== Cup ===
Cup semifinals
22 September – 12:30
China | 48
Hong Kong | 0
22 September – 12:55
Thailand | 7
Japan | 10

Cup final
22 September – 16:15
China | 24
Japan | 17
3rd place final
22 September – 15:25
Hong Kong | 7
Thailand | 32

== Bangkok ==
=== Pool A ===
| Team | W | D | L | PF | PA | PD | Pts |
|---|---|---|---|---|---|---|---|
| China | 3 | 0 | 0 | 104 | 19 | +85 | 9 |
| Hong Kong | 2 | 0 | 1 | 107 | 29 | +78 | 7 |
| Kazakhstan | 0 | 1 | 2 | 12 | 84 | –72 | 4 |
| United Arab Emirates | 0 | 1 | 2 | 12 | 103 | –91 | 4 |

9 November
11:40

| Hong Kong | 45–0 | Kazakhstan |

Boonyachinda Stadium, Bangkok

9 November
12:05

| China | 48–0 | United Arab Emirates |

Boonyachinda Stadium, Bangkok

9 November
15:00

| Hong Kong | 43–0 | United Arab Emirates |

Boonyachinda Stadium, Bangkok

9 November
15:25

| China | 27–0 | Kazakhstan |

Boonyachinda Stadium, Bangkok

9 November
18:20

| Kazakhstan | 12–12 | United Arab Emirates |

Boonyachinda Stadium, Bangkok

9 November
18:45

| China | 29–19 | Hong Kong |

Boonyachinda Stadium, Bangkok

=== Pool B ===
| Team | W | D | L | PF | PA | PD | Pts |
|---|---|---|---|---|---|---|---|
| Japan | 3 | 0 | 0 | 137 | 12 | +125 | 9 |
| Thailand | 2 | 0 | 1 | 79 | 33 | +46 | 7 |
| Malaysia | 1 | 0 | 2 | 26 | 90 | –64 | 5 |
| Singapore | 0 | 0 | 3 | 21 | 128 | –107 | 3 |

9 November
12:30

| Thailand | 43–0 | Singapore |

Boonyachinda Stadium, Bangkok

9 November
12:55

| Japan | 45–0 | Malaysia |

Boonyachinda Stadium, Bangkok

9 November
15:50

| Thailand | 24–0 | Malaysia |

Boonyachinda Stadium, Bangkok

9 November
16:15

| Japan | 59–0 | Singapore |

Boonyachinda Stadium, Bangkok

9 November
19:10

| Singapore | 21–26 | Malaysia |

Boonyachinda Stadium, Bangkok

9 November
19:35

| Japan | 33–12 | Thailand |

Boonyachinda Stadium, Bangkok

=== Plate ===
Plate semifinals
10 November – 11:40
Kazakhstan | 33
Singapore | 0
10 November – 12:05
United Arab Emirates | 17
Malaysia | 22

Plate final
10 November – 14:35
Kazakhstan | 41
Malaysia | 0
7th place final
10 November – 14:10
United Arab Emirates | 24
Singapore | 0

=== Cup ===
Cup semifinals
10 November – 12:30
China | 7
Thailand | 0
10 November – 12:55
Hong Kong | 10
Japan | 19

Cup final
10 November – 16:15
Japan | 26
China | 7
3rd place final
10 November – 15:25
Thailand | 24
Hong Kong | 5
