= 2022 Asia Rugby Women's Sevens Series =

- Hosts: Thailand; South Korea; United Arab Emirates
- Date: 22 October – 27 November 2022
- Nations: 8

Final positions
- Champions: China
- Runners-up: Japan
- Third: Thailand

The 2022 Asia Rugby Women's Sevens Series was the twenty-second edition of the tournament. The series was played over three legs in Thailand, South Korea and the United Arab Emirates.

China won the series after winning the Bangkok and Al Ain tournaments, Japan won the Incheon leg.

== Teams ==
- China
- Hong Kong
- Japan
- Kazakhstan
- Malaysia
- Philippines
- Sri Lanka
- Thailand

== Tour Venues ==
The official schedule for the 2022 Asia Rugby Women's Sevens Series is:

Leg	City	Dates	Winner
Thailand	Bangkok	22–23 October 2022	China
South Korea	Incheon	12–13 November 2022	Japan
United Arab Emirates	Al Ain	26–27 November 2022	China

== Final standings ==
Rank	Team	Thailand	South Korea	UAE	Points
1st place, gold medalist(s)	China	12	10	12	34
2nd place, silver medalist(s)	Japan	10	12	10	32
3rd place, bronze medalist(s)	Thailand	8	8	8	24
4	Hong Kong	7	5	7	19
5	Kazakhstan	5	7	5	17
6	Philippines	2	2	4	8
7	Malaysia	4	1	2	7
8	Sri Lanka	—	4	—	4

== Tournaments ==
=== Thailand ===
The tournament was held 22–23 October in Thailand. All times in Thailand Standard Time (UTC+07:00).

==== Pool Stage ====
Pool A

Teams	Pld	W	D	L	PF	PA	+/−	Pts	
Japan	3	3	0	0	105	21	+84	9	Advances to Cup
Thailand	3	2	0	1	99	19	+80	7	Advances to Cup
Kazakhstan	3	1	0	2	19	77	–58	5	Advances to Plate
Philippines	3	0	0	3	10	116	–106	3	Advances to Plate

22 October 2022	Kazakhstan	0–34	Thailand
11:40

22 October 2022	Japan	53–0	Philippines
12:05

22 October 2022	Kazakhstan	12–10	Philippines
15:00

22 October 2022	Japan	19–14	Thailand
15:25

22 October 2022	Thailand	51–0	Philippines
18:20

22 October 2022	Japan	33–7	Kazakhstan
18:45

Pool B

Teams	Pld	W	D	L	PF	PA	+/−	Pts	
China	3	3	0	0	97	12	+85	9	Advances to Cup
Hong Kong	3	2	0	1	68	24	+44	7	Advances to Cup
Malaysia	3	1	0	2	20	89	–69	5	Advances to Plate
BYE (Note: Teams on BYE were awarded 20 points.)	3	0	0	3	0	60	–60	0	Advances to Plate

22 October 2022	China	53–0	Malaysia
12:30

22 October 2022	Hong Kong	20–0	BYE
12:55

22 October 2022	Hong Kong	36–0	Malaysia
15:50

22 October 2022	China	20–0	BYE
16:15

22 October 2022	China	24–12	Hong Kong
19:10

22 October 2022	Malaysia	20–0	BYE
19:35

==== Knockout Stage ====
Plate

Semi-finals
23 October, 13:10
Kazakhstan	0
BYE	0
23 October, 13:35
Philippines	12
Malaysia	22

Plate Final
23 October, 16:05
Kazakhstan	32
Malaysia	0
7th Place
23 October, 15:40
Philippines	0
BYE	0

Cup

Semi-finals
23 October, 14:00
Japan	14
Hong Kong	7
23 October, 14:25
Thailand	5
China	33

Cup Final
23 October, 17:45
China	21
Japan	14
3rd Place
23 October, 16:55
Thailand	10
Hong Kong	0

=== South Korea ===
The tournament was held 12–13 November in South Korea. All times in Korea Standard Time (UTC+09:00).

==== Pool Stage ====
Pool A

Teams	Pld	W	D	L	PF	PA	+/−	Pts	
China	3	3	0	0	117	7	+110	9	Advances to Cup
Kazakhstan	3	2	0	1	68	36	+32	7	Advances to Cup
Hong Kong	3	1	0	2	54	48	+6	5	Advances to Plate
Sri Lanka	3	0	0	3	0	148	–148	3	Advances to Plate

12 November 2022	Hong Kong	7–15	Kazakhstan
11:40

12 November 2022	China	55–0	Sri Lanka
12:05

12 November 2022	Hong Kong	47–0	Sri Lanka
15:25

12 November 2022	China	29–7	Kazakhstan
15:50

12 November 2022	Kazakhstan	46–0	Sri Lanka
18:45

12 November 2022	China	33–0	Hong Kong
19:10

Pool B

Teams	Pld	W	D	L	PF	PA	+/−	Pts	
Japan	3	3	0	0	92	5	+87	9	Advances to Cup
Thailand	3	2	0	1	67	12	+55	7	Advances to Cup
Malaysia	3	1	0	2	5	86	–81	5	Advances to Plate
Philippines	3	0	0	3	10	71	–61	3	Advances to Plate

12 November 2022	Japan	39–5	Philippines
12:30

12 November 2022	Thailand	40–0	Malaysia
12:55

12 November 2022	Thailand	27–5	Philippines
16:15

12 November 2022	Japan	46–0	Malaysia
16:40

12 November 2022	Japan	7–0	Thailand
19:35

12 November 2022	Malaysia	5–0	Philippines
20:00

==== Knockout Stage ====
Plate

Semi-finals
13 November 2022, 13:10
Hong Kong	12
Philippines	5
13 November 2022, 13:35
Sri Lanka	17
Malaysia	14

Plate Final
13 November 2022, 16:05
Hong Kong	43
Sri Lanka	7
7th Place
13 November 2022, 15:40
Philippines	19
Malaysia	0

Cup

Semi-finals
13 November 2022, 14:00
China	29
Thailand	0
13 November 2022, 14:25
Kazakhstan	0
Japan	43

Cup Final
13 November 2022, 17:45
Japan	19
China	14
3rd Place
13 November 2022, 16:55
Thailand	26
Kazakhstan	5

=== United Arab Emirates ===
The tournament was held 26–27 November in the United Arab Emirates. All times in UAE Standard Time (UTC+04:00).

==== Pool Stage ====
Pool A

Teams	Pld	W	D	L	PF	PA	+/−	Pts	
Japan	3	3	0	0	121	21	+100	9	Advances to Cup
Hong Kong	3	1	1	1	83	45	+38	6	Advances to Cup
Kazakhstan	3	1	1	1	60	48	+12	6	Advances to Plate
Malaysia	3	0	0	3	5	155	–150	3	Advances to Plate

26 November 2022	Kazakhstan	12–12	Hong Kong
11:40

26 November 2022	Japan	57–0	Malaysia
12:05

26 November 2022	Kazakhstan	41–5	Malaysia
15:00

26 November 2022	Japan	33–14	Hong Kong
15:25

26 November 2022	Hong Kong	57–0	Malaysia
18:20

26 November 2022	Japan	31–7	Kazakhstan
18:45

Pool B

Teams	Pld	W	D	L	PF	PA	+/−	Pts	
China	3	3	0	0	103	0	+103	9	Advances to Cup
Thailand	3	2	0	1	54	26	+28	7	Advances to Cup
Philippines	3	1	0	2	20	91	–71	5	Advances to Plate
Sri Lanka (Note: Sri Lanka withdrew from the competition, teams on BYE were awarded 20 points.)	3	0	0	3	0	60	–60	0	Advances to Plate

26 November 2022	Thailand	20–0	Sri Lanka
12:30

26 November 2022	China	57–0	Philippines
12:55

26 November 2022	Thailand	34–0	Philippines
15:50

26 November 2022	China	20–0	Sri Lanka
16:15

26 November 2022	Philippines	20–0	Sri Lanka
19:10

26 November 2022	China	26–0	Thailand
19:35

==== Knockout Stage ====
Plate

Semi-finals
27 November 2022
Kazakhstan	0
BYE	0
27 November 2022, 13:35
Malaysia	7
Philippines	17

Plate Final
27 November 2022, 16:05
Kazakhstan	17
Philippines	0
7th Place
27 November 2022
Malaysia	0
BYE	0

Cup

Semi-finals
27 November 2022, 14:00
Japan	19
Thailand	14
27 November 2022, 14:25
Hong Kong	0
China	31

Cup Final
27 November 2022, 17:45
China	21
Japan	14
3rd Place
27 November 2022, 16:55
Thailand	24
Hong Kong	10
