= 2002 Hong Kong Women's Sevens =

- Host nation: Hong Kong
- Date: March 21–22

Cup
- Champion: Aotearoa Maori NZ
- Runner-up: United States

Plate
- Winner: Kazakhstan
- Runner-up: Hong Kong

Bowl
- Winner: (Cooperation Council for the Arab States of the Gulf) Arabian Gulf
- Runner-up: China

Tournament details
- Matches played: 20

The 2002 Hong Kong Women's Sevens was the fifth edition of the tournament and took place on 21–22 March 2002. (Note: Source Hong Kong Union) The Aotearoa Maori New Zealand team defeated the United States in the Cup final to win the tournament.

== Teams ==
Eight teams competed in the competition.

- Aotearoa Maori New Zealand
- (Cooperation Council for the Arab States of the Gulf) Arabian Gulf
- China
- Hong Kong
- Japan
- Kazakhstan
- Thailand
- United States

== Group matches ==
Key to colours in group tables
Teams that advanced to the Cup Semifinal

=== Pool A ===
Nation	Won	Drawn	Lost	For	Against
Aotearoa Maori New Zealand	3	0	0	140	0
Hong Kong	2	0	1	50	50
(Cooperation Council for the Arab States of the Gulf) Arabian Gulf	1	0	2	24	78
Thailand	0	0	3	12	98

Aotearoa Maori New Zealand	50–0	Thailand

Hong Kong	19–7	(Cooperation Council for the Arab States of the Gulf) Arabian Gulf

Aotearoa Maori New Zealand	43–0	Hong Kong

Arabian Gulf (Cooperation Council for the Arab States of the Gulf)	0–47	Aotearoa Maori New Zealand

Hong Kong	31–0	Thailand

Thailand	12–17	(Cooperation Council for the Arab States of the Gulf) Arabian Gulf

=== Pool B ===
Nation	Won	Drawn	Lost	For	Against
United States	3	0	0	78	10
Kazakhstan	2	0	1	70	12
China	1	0	2	10	61
Japan	0	0	3	5	80

United States	32–0	China

Kazakhstan	36–0	Japan

United States	12–10	Kazakhstan

Japan	0–34	United States

Kazakhstan	24–0	China

China	10–5	Japan

== Classification stages ==
=== Cup Semi-final ===
Semi-finals
Aotearoa Maori NZ	19
Kazakhstan	0
United States	15
Hong Kong	0

Cup Final
Aotearoa Maori NZ	14
United States	7
Plate Final (Note: Also an Asian Championship final)
Kazakhstan	55
Hong Kong	0

=== Bowl Semi-final ===
Semi-finals
(Cooperation Council for the Arab States of the Gulf) Arabian Gulf	19
Japan	7
China	5
Thailand	0

Bowl Final
(Cooperation Council for the Arab States of the Gulf) Arabian Gulf	22
China	5
7th Place
Japan	12
Thailand	10
