= 2015 Asia Rugby Women's Sevens Series =

- Hosts: China; Sri Lanka
- Date: September 5-6 & October 10-11
- Nations: 8

Final positions
- Champions: Japan
- Runners-up: China
- Third: Hong Kong

The 2015 Asia Rugby Women's Sevens Series is the 16th edition of Asia's continental sevens tournament for women. It was played over two legs hosted in Qingdao, China and Sri Lanka.

== China ==
The first leg of the series was held from 5 to 6 September at Qingdao, China.

=== Pool Stage ===
Pool W

Nation	Won	Drawn	Lost	For	Against
Hong Kong	3	0	0	99	15
China	2	0	1	93	24
Singapore	1	0	2	19	112
Sri Lanka	0	0	3	17	77

Hong Kong	53-0	Singapore

China	31-5	Sri Lanka

Hong Kong	27-5	Sri Lanka

China	52-0	Singapore

Singapore	19-7	Sri Lanka

China	10-19	Hong Kong

Pool X

Nation	Won	Drawn	Lost	For	Against
Kazakhstan	3	0	0	79	24
Japan	2	0	1	111	19
Thailand	1	0	2	40	84
Uzbekistan	0	0	3	0	103

Kazakhstan	27-0	Uzbekistan

Japan	44-7	Thailand

Kazakhstan	40-14	Thailand

Japan	57-0	Uzbekistan

Thailand	19-0	Uzbekistan

Kazakhstan	12-10	Japan

=== Playoffs ===
==== Cup Quarter-finals ====
Quarter-finals
Japan	50
Singapore	0
Hong Kong	31
Uzbekistan	0
Kazakhstan	40
Sri Lanka	5
China	24
Thailand	5

Semi-finals
Hong Kong	5
Japan	0
China	22
Kazakhstan	17

Cup Final
Hong Kong	26
China	15
3rd Place
Japan	15
Kazakhstan	0

==== Plate Semi-finals ====
Semi-finals
Singapore	21
Uzbekistan	7
Thailand	24
Sri Lanka	14

Plate Final
Thailand	27
Singapore	0
7th Place
Uzbekistan	17
Sri Lanka	14

== Sri Lanka ==
The last leg of the series took place on 10 to 11 October at Colombo, Sri Lanka.

=== Pool Stage ===
Pool W

Nation	Won	Drawn	Lost	For	Against
Japan	3	0	0	74	22
Thailand	2	0	1	29	43
Hong Kong	1	0	2	62	22
Uzbekistan	0	0	3	17	95

Japan	21–17	Uzbekistan

Hong Kong	5–7	Thailand

Japan	38–0	Thailand

Hong Kong	52–0	Uzbekistan

Thailand	22–0	Uzbekistan

Hong Kong	5–15	Japan

Pool X

Nation	Won	Drawn	Lost	For	Against
China	2	1	0	107	7
Kazakhstan	2	1	0	67	24
Sri Lanka	1	0	2	38	72
Singapore	0	0	3	17	126

Kazakhstan	17–10	Sri Lanka

China	55–0	Singapore

Kazakhstan	43–7	Singapore

China	45–0	Sri Lanka

Singapore	10–28	Sri Lanka

China	7–7	Kazakhstan

=== Playoffs ===
==== Cup Quarter-finals ====
Quarter-finals
Kazakhstan	7
Hong Kong	14
Japan	38
Singapore	0
China	55
Uzbekistan	5
Thailand	17
Sri Lanka	0

Semi-finals
Japan	17
Hong Kong	0
China	24
Thailand	5

Cup Final
Japan	33
China	12
3rd Place
Hong Kong	21
Thailand	5

==== Plate Semi-finals ====
Semi-finals
Kazakhstan	29
Singapore	0
Uzbekistan	17
Sri Lanka	7

Plate Final
Kazakhstan	43
Uzbekistan	0
7th Place
Singapore	17
Sri Lanka	14

== Final standings ==
Rank	Team	China	Sri Lanka	Points
1st place, gold medalist(s)	Japan	6	8	14
2nd place, silver medalist(s)	China	7	7	14
3rd place, bronze medalist(s)	Hong Kong	8	6	14
4	Kazakhstan	5	4	9
5	Thailand	4	5	9
6	Singapore	3	2	5
7	Uzbekistan	2	3	5
8	Sri Lanka	1	1	2
