= Rugby sevens at the 2015 SEA Games – Women's tournament =

Rugby sevens at the 2015 Southeast Asian Games – Women's tournament
Tournament details
- Host: Singapore
- Venue: Choa Chu Kang Stadium
- Date: 6–7 June 2015
- Countries: Laos; Malaysia; Philippines; Singapore; Thailand
- Teams: 5

Final positions
- Champions: Thailand
- Runner-up: Singapore
- Third place: Philippines
- Fourth place: Malaysia

Tournament statistics
- Matches played: 12

The 2015 Women's Southeast Asian Games Rugby sevens Tournament was held in Choa Chu Kang Stadium in Singapore from 6 to 7 June 2015.

Thailand defeated Singapore in the final to claim their first title.

== Results ==
Pos	Team	Pld	W	D	L	PF	PA	PD	Pts	Final Result
1	Thailand	4	4	0	0	149	5	+144	16	Advanced to Final
2	Singapore (H)	4	3	0	1	100	38	+62	13	Advanced to Final
3	Philippines	4	2	0	2	51	48	+3	10	Advanced to Third place match
4	Malaysia	4	1	0	3	17	93	−76	7	Advanced to Third place match
5	Laos	4	0	0	4	0	133	−133	4	

Source: Seagames 2015
(H) Hosts

=== Preliminary round ===
6 June 2015
11:15

Laos	0 – 17	Malaysia
	Report

Choa Chu Kang Stadium

6 June 2015
11:40

Thailand	31 – 5	Singapore
	Report

Choa Chu Kang Stadium

6 June 2015
13:45

Laos	0 – 17	Philippines
	Report

Choa Chu Kang Stadium

6 June 2015
14:10

Malaysia	0 – 29	Singapore
	Report

Choa Chu Kang Stadium

6 June 2015
16:15

Laos	0 – 54	Singapore
	Report

Choa Chu Kang Stadium

6 June 2015
16:40

Thailand	36 – 0	Philippines
	Report

Choa Chu Kang Stadium

7 June 2015
11:15

Thailand	37 – 0	Malaysia
	Report

Choa Chu Kang Stadium

7 June 2015
11:40

Singapore	12 – 7	Philippines
	Report

Choa Chu Kang Stadium

7 June 2015
13:45

Laos	0 – 45	Thailand
	Report

Choa Chu Kang Stadium

7 June 2015
14:10

Philippines	27 – 0	Malaysia
	Report

Choa Chu Kang Stadium

=== Third place match ===
7 June 2015
15:25

Philippines	22 – 0	Malaysia
	Report

Choa Chu Kang Stadium

=== Final ===
7 June 2015
16:15

Thailand	39 – 0	Singapore
	Report

Choa Chu Kang Stadium

== Final standing ==
Rank	Team
1st place, gold medalist(s)	Thailand
2nd place, silver medalist(s)	Singapore
3rd place, bronze medalist(s)	Philippines
4	Malaysia
5	Laos

Rugby Sevens at the 2015 Southeast Asian Games champions

Thailand
1st title
