= 2003 Hong Kong Women's Sevens =

- Host nation: Hong Kong
- Date: March 27–28

Cup
- Champion: Aotearoa Maori NZ
- Runner-up: England

The 2003 Hong Kong Women's Sevens was the sixth edition of the tournament and occurred on the 27th and 28 March 2003. Fiji made their first international appearance since 1997; Sri Lanka, Kyrgyzstan and Uzbekistan made their international debut.

Aotearoa Maori New Zealand defeated England to win the tournament.

== Tournament format ==
Ten teams competed in a separate tournament for the Asia Champions Cup on 27 March 2003, with four teams progressing to the main Hong Kong Women's Sevens tournament Cup quarterfinals. They joined England, Aotearoa Maori New Zealand, USA, and Fiji.

In the Asia Champions Cup, teams in 3rd, 4th and 5th split into two groups. The placings in these groups then played off in three finals, for 9th, 7th and 5th, the latter referred to as the Asia D Cup. Additionally the best two to progress to Hong Kong also played off for the Asia C Cup.

== Asia Champions Cup ==
=== Group stage ===
==== Pool A ====
Nation	W	D	L	PF	PA	Pts
Kazakhstan	4	0	0	176	5	8
Thailand	3	0	1	65	58	6
Singapore	2	0	2	56	70	4
Hong Kong Barbarians	1	0	3	15	87	2
Kyrgyzstan	0	0	4	17	109	0

Hong Kong Barbarians	10–0	Kyrgyzstan

Singapore	17–10	Kyrgyzstan

Singapore	22–0	Hong Kong Barbarians

Kazakhstan	29–5	Thailand

Thailand	22–17	Singapore

Kazakhstan	56–0	Kyrgyzstan

Thailand	12–5	Hong Kong Barbarians

Kazakhstan	38–0	Singapore

Thailand	26–7	Kyrgyzstan

Kazakhstan	53–0	Hong Kong Barbarians

==== Pool B ====
Nation	W	D	L	PF	PA	Pts
Hong Kong	4	0	0	139	10	8
(Cooperation Council for the Arab States of the Gulf) Arabian Gulf	3	0	1	106	22	6
China	2	0	2	27	56	4
Sri Lanka	1	0	3	24	99	2
Uzbekistan	0	0	4	5	114	0

Arabian Gulf (Cooperation Council for the Arab States of the Gulf)	28–0	Uzbekistan

Hong Kong	43–0	Sri Lanka

China	22–0	Uzbekistan

Hong Kong	22–5	(Cooperation Council for the Arab States of the Gulf) Arabian Gulf

Sri Lanka	24–0	Uzbekistan

Arabian Gulf (Cooperation Council for the Arab States of the Gulf)	22–0	China

China	5–0	Sri Lanka

Hong Kong	40–5	Uzbekistan

Arabian Gulf (Cooperation Council for the Arab States of the Gulf)	51–0	Sri Lanka

Hong Kong	34–0	China

=== Classification stage ===
==== Group A ====
Nation	Won	Lost	For	Against
Singapore	2	0	74	0
Hong Kong Barbarians	1	1	22	24
Uzbekistan	0	2	0	72

Singapore	50–0	Uzbekistan

Hong Kong Barbarians	22–0	Uzbekistan

Singapore	24–0	Hong Kong Barbarians

==== Group B ====
Nation	Won	Lost	For	Against
Kyrgyzstan	2	0	42	5
China	1	1	10	20
Sri Lanka	0	2	10	37

China	0–15	Kyrgyzstan

Sri Lanka	5–27	Kyrgyzstan

China	10–5	Sri Lanka

==== Finals ====
===== 9th place =====
Uzbekistan	0–28	Sri Lanka

===== 7th place =====
Hong Kong Barbarians	17–5	China

===== Asia D Cup (5th place) =====
Singapore	12–10	Kyrgyzstan

===== Asia C Cup =====
Kazakhstan	34–0	Hong Kong Barbarians

== Hong Kong Sevens (Main Tournament) ==
=== Group stage ===
Nation	Won	Drawn	Lost	For	Against	Points
Aotearoa Maori New Zealand	3	0	0	86	12	6
England	2	0	1	44	26	4
United States	1	0	2	38	27	2
Fiji	0	0	3	0	103	0

Aotearoa Maori NZ	26–12	England

United States	38–0	Fiji

Aotearoa Maori NZ	38–0	Fiji

England	5–0	United States

Aotearoa Maori NZ	22–0	United States

England	27–0	Fiji

=== Finals ===
==== Cup and Plate Final ====
Quarter-finals
England	27
(Cooperation Council for the Arab States of the Gulf) Arabian Gulf	0
Kazakhstan	27
Fiji	5
United States	29
Hong Kong	0
Aotearoa Maori New Zealand	46
Thailand	0

Semi-finals
England	19
Kazakhstan	5
Aotearoa Maori New Zealand	17
United States	5

Cup Final
Aotearoa Maori New Zealand	27
England	0
Plate Final
Kazakhstan (Note: Kazakhstan, as highest placed Asian team, were declared Asian champions)	14
United States	7

==== Bowl and Shield Final ====
Semi-finals
Fiji	34
(Cooperation Council for the Arab States of the Gulf) Arabian Gulf	0
Hong Kong	19
Thailand	5

Bowl Final
Fiji	34
Hong Kong	12
Shield Final (Note: also reported as 24–7)
(Cooperation Council for the Arab States of the Gulf) Arabian Gulf	24
Thailand	5
