= 2012 Asia Pacific Women's Sevens Championship =

2012 Asia Pacific Women’s Sevens Championship
- Host nation: Malaysia
- Date: 31 August–1 September 2012

Cup
- Champion: Australia
- Runner-up: Japan
- Third: Papua New Guinea

Tournament details
- Matches played: 29

The 2012 Asia Pacific Women’s Sevens Championship took place in Kota Kinabalu, Malaysia from 31 August to 1 September 2012. Australia defeated Japan in the Cup final to win the tournament and defending champions, Papua New Guinea, won the bronze final.

== Teams ==
Ten teams competed in the tournament:

- Australia
- China
- Hong Kong
- Japan
- Kazakhstan
- Papua New Guinea
- Singapore
- South Korea
- Taiwan
- Thailand

== Pool Stages ==
=== Group A ===
Nation	Won	Drawn	Lost	For	Against
Papua New Guinea	3	1	0	99	55
Hong Kong	3	0	1	89	45
China	2	1	1	104	38
Thailand	1	0	3	60	81
South Korea	0	0	4	0	133

China	44–0	South Korea

Papua New Guinea	35–24	Hong Kong

China	5–12	Hong Kong

Papua New Guinea	26–12	Thailand

China	36–7	Thailand

Papua New Guinea	19–0	South Korea

Hong Kong	34–0	South Korea

Thailand	36–0	South Korea

Thailand	5–19	Hong Kong

China	19–19	Papua New Guinea

=== Group B ===
Nation	Won	Drawn	Lost	For	Against
Japan	4	0	0	107	22
Australia	3	0	1	131	14
Kazakhstan	2	0	2	73	33
Taiwan	1	0	3	17	117
Singapore	0	0	4	5	137

Kazakhstan	41–0	Singapore

Australia	59–0	Taiwan

Kazakhstan	27–0	Taiwan

Australia	10–14	Japan

Kazakhstan	5–21	Japan

Australia	50–0	Singapore

Taiwan	10–5	Singapore

Japan	36–0	Singapore

Japan	36–7	Taiwan

Kazakhstan	0–12	Australia

== Classification Stages ==
=== Cup Semi-finals ===
Semi-finals
Papua New Guinea	7
Australia	12
Japan	37
Hong Kong	0

Cup Final
Australia	36
Japan	17
3rd Place
Papua New Guinea	26
Hong Kong	17

=== Plate semifinals ===
Semi-finals
China	24
Taiwan	0
Kazakhstan	22
Thailand	0

Plate Final
Kazakhstan	29
China	14
7th Place
Taiwan	24
Thailand	12

=== Bowl final (9th place) ===
Singapore	29–0	South Korea
