= 2007 ARFU Women's Sevens Championship =

- Host nation: Qatar
- Date: 27–28 April 2007

Cup
- Champion: Kazakhstan
- Runner-up: Japan

Tournament details
- Matches played: 32

The 2007 ARFU Women's Sevens Championship is the competitions eighth edition. It was held in Doha, Qatar from 27 to 28 April 2007. Eight teams competed in the tournament, Kazakhstan were crowned Champions after defeating Japan in the Cup final.

== Group Stage ==
=== Standings Table ===
Pos	Team	P	W	D	L	PF	PA	PD	Pts	
1	Kazakhstan	7	7	0	0	168	10	+158	21	Qualified for the Cup Final
2	Japan	7	6	0	1	165	49	+116	19	Qualified for the Cup Final
3	Thailand	7	5	0	2	176	69	+107	17	Qualified for the Plate Final
4	(Cooperation Council for the Arab States of the Gulf) Arabian Gulf	7	4	0	3	52	65	–13	15	Qualified for the Plate Final
5	Singapore	7	3	0	4	55	145	–90	13	Qualified for the Bowl Final
6	Hong Kong	7	2	0	5	91	98	–7	11	Qualified for the Bowl Final
7	Uzbekistan	7	1	0	6	30	135	–105	9	Qualified for the Shield Final
8	Sri Lanka	7	0	0	7	22	188	–166	7	Qualified for the Shield Final

=== Matches ===
27 April 2007

Arabian Gulf (Cooperation Council for the Arab States of the Gulf)	10–0	Singapore

27 April 2007

Kazakhstan	28–5	Thailand

27 April 2007

Japan	22–7	Hong Kong

27 April 2007

Uzbekistan	10–5	Sri Lanka

27 April 2007

Thailand	22–5	Singapore

27 April 2007

Japan	19–5	(Cooperation Council for the Arab States of the Gulf) Arabian Gulf

27 April 2007

Kazakhstan	27–0	Uzbekistan

27 April 2007

Hong Kong	41–0	Sri Lanka

27 April 2007

Japan	26–20	Thailand

27 April 2007

Singapore	19–10	Uzbekistan

27 April 2007

Arabian Gulf (Cooperation Council for the Arab States of the Gulf)	10–0	Hong Kong

27 April 2007

Kazakhstan	35–0	Sri Lanka

27 April 2007

Japan	17–5	Uzbekistan

27 April 2007

Thailand	24–5	Hong Kong

27 April 2007

Kazakhstan	34–0	Singapore

27 April 2007

Arabian Gulf (Cooperation Council for the Arab States of the Gulf)	17–5	Sri Lanka

28 April 2007

Hong Kong	26–5	Uzbekistan

28 April 2007

Kazakhstan	12–5	Japan

28 April 2007

Thailand	29–5	(Cooperation Council for the Arab States of the Gulf) Arabian Gulf

28 April 2007

Singapore	14–12	Sri Lanka

28 April 2007

Kazakhstan	20–0	Hong Kong

28 April 2007

Arabian Gulf (Cooperation Council for the Arab States of the Gulf)	5–0	Uzbekistan

28 April 2007

Japan	45–0	Singapore

28 April 2007

Thailand	40–0	Sri Lanka

28 April 2007

Kazakhstan	12–0	(Cooperation Council for the Arab States of the Gulf) Arabian Gulf

28 April 2007

Singapore	17–12	Hong Kong

28 April 2007

Thailand	36–0	Uzbekistan

28 April 2007

Japan	31–0	Sri Lanka

== Classification Stage ==
=== Shield Final ===
28 April 2007

Uzbekistan	19–5	Sri Lanka

=== Bowl Final ===
28 April 2007

Hong Kong	7–5	Singapore

=== Plate Final ===
28 April 2007

Thailand	50–0	(Cooperation Council for the Arab States of the Gulf) Arabian Gulf

=== Cup Final ===
28 April 2007

Kazakhstan	25–0	Japan
