= 2004 ARFU Women's Sevens Championship =

- Host nation: Kazakhstan
- Date: 15–16 May 2004

Cup
- Champion: Kazakhstan
- Runner-up: Singapore

Plate
- Winner: Taiwan
- Runner-up: Uzbekistan

Tournament details
- Matches played: 24

The 2004 ARFU Women's Sevens Championship was the fifth edition of the competition and was held at Almaty, Kazakhstan from 15 to 16 May 2004.

Kazakhstan won the tournament after beating Singapore in the Cup final.

== Tournament ==
=== Pool Stage ===
==== Pool A ====
Nation	Won	Drawn	Lost	For	Against
Kazakhstan	3	0	0	87	0
Singapore	2	0	1	42	65
Taiwan	1	0	2	50	54
Uzbekistan	0	0	3	33	90

15 May 2004

Kazakhstan	15–0	Taiwan

15 May 2004

Singapore	21–12 (Note: 19–12 in some reports)	Uzbekistan

15 May 2004

Kazakhstan	36–0	Uzbekistan

15 May 2004

Singapore	21–17	Taiwan

15 May 2004

Kazakhstan	36–0	Singapore

15 May 2004

Taiwan	33–21	Uzbekistan

==== Pool B ====
Nation	Won	Drawn	Lost	For	Against
(Cooperation Council for the Arab States of the Gulf) Arabian Gulf	2	0	1	34	37
Hong Kong	2	0	1	46	24
Kyrgyzstan	1	0	2	35	47
Kazakhstan-2	1	0	2	46	58

15 May 2004

Hong Kong	15–5	Kyrgyzstan

15 May 2004

Arabian Gulf (Cooperation Council for the Arab States of the Gulf)	12–22	Kazakhstan-2

15 May 2004

Hong Kong	26–12	Kazakhstan-2

15 May 2004

Arabian Gulf (Cooperation Council for the Arab States of the Gulf)	17–10	Kyrgyzstan

15 May 2004

Hong Kong	5–7	(Cooperation Council for the Arab States of the Gulf) Arabian Gulf

15 May 2004

Kazakhstan-2	12–20	Kyrgyzstan

=== Finals ===
==== Cup semi-finals ====
Semi-finals
16 May 2004
Kazakhstan	20
Hong Kong	5
16 May 2004
(Cooperation Council for the Arab States of the Gulf) Arabian Gulf	0
Singapore	26

Cup Final
16 May 2004
Kazakhstan (Note: 48–5 in some reports)	45
Singapore	5
3rd Place
16 May 2004
Hong Kong	36
(Cooperation Council for the Arab States of the Gulf) Arabian Gulf	19

==== Plate semi-finals ====
Semi-finals
16 May 2004
Taiwan	12
Kazakhstan-2	5
16 May 2004
Uzbekistan	15
Kyrgyzstan	10

Plate Final
16 May 2004
Taiwan	19
Uzbekistan	10
7th Place
16 May 2004
Kazakhstan-2	29
Kyrgyzstan	22
