= Bangladesh Rugby Federation Union =

Governing body for rugby union in Bangladesh

Bangladesh Rugby
- Sport: Rugby Union
- Jurisdiction: National
- Abbreviation: BANR
- Founded: 5 May 2007
- Regional affiliation: Asia Rugby
- Headquarters: Bangabandhu National Stadium 1st Floor, Room No 16, Gate No 3, Motijheel
- Location: Dhaka, Bangladesh
- President: Shafiul Islam Mohiuddin
- Coach: Mohammad Abdul Kader

Official website
- www.bangladeshrugby.com
- (Bangladesh)

Bangladesh Rugby Federation Union is the governing body for rugby union in Bangladesh. It was founded in 2007 for the administration and development rugby in Bangladesh.

== History ==
Rugby union in Bangladesh was originally a popular sport in the Bengal Presidency during the British Raj. Following the partition of India, engagement fell away. In 2005, rugby started to be played again in Bangladesh following Japanese rugby coaches reintroducing the sport to schools in Dhaka.

The Bangladesh Rugby Federation Union was founded on 5 May 2007 for the control and development rugby in Bangladesh, alongside football and cricket also hockey. The governing body headquarters in Motijheel, Dhaka, Bangladesh. The organization vice president said his team will qualify in the Rugby World Cup in his tenure period. They have commences several schools and inter district age levels rugby tournament to get some skills full players for national men's and women's team.

== Competitions ==
Bangladesh Rugby Federation Union arrangements some minor tournaments all over the country. Although rugby still not as famous within the country. Some schools and district levels tournaments holding in the country. The Bangladesh RFU predominantly focusses on rugby sevens but organises tournaments for all rugby union variants with funding from sponsors and the National Sports Council. In 2020, during the COVID-19 pandemic in Bangladesh, the Bangladesh RFU received criticism for running a tournament called "Corona Cup Rugby". The Bangladeshi Youth and Sports Minister, Zahid Ahsan Russel, accused them of making a mockery of the pandemic and the Bangladesh Olympic Association called it "madness". The Bangladesh RFU responded by stating it was held to raise awareness of Covid-19.

== Teams ==
- Bangladesh national rugby union team
- Bangladesh women's national rugby union team

== Governing body ==
As of 11 June 2023

Position	Name
President	Shafiul Islam Mohiuddin
Chief Executive Officer	Nazmus Shakib Shovon
General Secretary	Sayeed Ahmed
