= Philippines women's national rugby sevens team =

Philippines
- Union: Philippine Rugby Football Union
- Nickname: Volcanoes
- Coach: Samantha Scott
- Captain: Acee San Juan
Team kit

First international
- China 36–0 Philippines (Guangzhou, China; July 2010)

Largest win
- Indonesia 0–51 Philippines (Singapore City, Singapore; April 2016)

Largest defeat
- Hong Kong 57–0 Philippines (Pune, India; November 2013)

World Cup Sevens
- Appearances: 0

The Philippine women's national rugby sevens team, known as the Volcanoes, represents the Philippines in rugby sevens. They played their first international sevens in 2010 at the Asian Championships. They won the 2019 Asia Rugby Women's 7s Trophy Series in Indonesia.

== Players ==
=== Previous squads ===
Squad to South East Asia Rugby Sevens in Singapore

- Monica Bolofer
- Tammy Fletcher
- Gelaine Gamba
- Hilla Indigne
- Camilla Maslo
- Ada Milby
- Trixie Pacis (cc)
- Rara Sales
- Acee San Juan (cc)
- Sylvia Tudoc
- Cassie Umali
- Dixie Yu
Squad to 28th Southeast Asian Games Rugby Sevens in Singapore

BRONZE MEDALISTS

- Rose dela Cruz
- Gelaine Gamba
- Kaye Honoras
- Hilla Indigne (vc)
- Ada Milby
- Aiumi Ono
- Trixie Pacis
- Rara Sales
- Madille Salinas
- Acee San Juan (c)
- Sylvia Tudoc
- Dixie Yu
Squad to 2015 Asian Women's Development Sevens Tournament in Chennai, India

- Rose dela Cruz
- Gelaine Gamba
- Kaye Honoras
- Hilla Indigne (vc)
- Luisa Jordan
- Leilani Martin
- Michelle Mateo
- Rara Sales
- Madille Salinas
- Acee San Juan (c)
- Sylvia Tudoc
- Dixie Yu
Squad to 2014 Asian Women's Sevens Series in Beijing, China

- Rose dela Cruz
- Tammy Fletcher
- Kaye Honoras
- Hilla Indigne
- Eunice Lacaste
- Gelaine Gamba
- Rara Sales
- Madille Salinas
- Acee San Juan (c)
- Aiumi Ono
- Cassie Umali (vc)
- Isabel Silva
Squad to 2014 Asian Women's Sevens Series in Hong Kong

- Rose dela Cruz
- Tammy Fletcher (c)
- Kaye Honoras
- Hilla Indigne
- Luisa Jordan
- Michelle Marki
- Rara Sales
- Madille Salinas
- Acee San Juan
- Sylvia Tudoc
- Cassie Umali (vc)
- Dixie Yu
Squad to 2013 Asian Women's Sevens Series in Pune, India

- Amelia Breyre
- Tonette Gambito
- Kaye Honoras
- Luisa Jordan
- Nikki Lira
- Michelle Marki
- Ada Milby (c)
- Jen Saldo
- Acee San Juan
- Manila Santos
- Sylvia Tudoc
- Cassie Umali (vc)
Squad to 2013 Asian Women's Sevens Series in Bang Saen, Thailand:

- Charmaine Bolando
- Tonette Gambito
- Kaye Honoras
- Luisa Jordan
- Nikki Lira
- Ada Milby (c)
- Astrid Sadaya
- Jen Saldo
- Madille Salinas
- Acee San Juan
- Sylvia Tudoc
- Cassie Umali (vc)
Squad to 2012 Asian Women's Rugby Sevens World Cup Qualifier in Pune, India

- Julie Ann Else
- Mirasol Leiloha Linsteadt
- Nikki Lira
- Leilani Martin
- Ada Milby (c)
- Rozie Morala
- Aiumi Ono (vc)
- Trixie Pacis
- Madille Salinas
- Acee San Juan
- Rhea Manila Santos
- Syndee Storey
- Cassie Umali
Squad to 2011 Hong Kong Women's Rugby Sevens

- Dyesebel Diaz
- Jackie Finlan (cc)
- Nikki Lira
- Aiumi Ono
- Cassie Umali
- Trixie Pacis
- Alana Padilla
- Rosette Rough (cc)
- Arlene Trinkler
- Isabela Silva
Squad to 2010 Asian Women's 7s Competition in Guangzhou, China

- Dyesebel Diaz
- Jackie Finlan (cc)
- Nikki Lira
- Aumi Ono
- Marga Pacis
- Trixie Pacis
- Alana Padilla
- Rosette Rough (cc)
- Blessie de los Santos
- Manila Santos
- Isabela Silva
- Syndee Storey

=== Coaches ===
- (Australia) Susan Konstanty (2013–2015)
- (Australia) Matt Cullen (2010–2012)
- (Samoa) Fetala'a Taua'a (2021–)

=== Captains ===
- Tammy Fletcher (2014)
- Ada Milby (2012–2013)
- Rosette Rough and Jackie Finlan (2010–2011)
