= Malaysia women's national rugby sevens team =

Malaysia women's sevens
- Union: Malaysia Rugby Union
- Nickname: Bunga Raya
- Emblem: Hibiscus
- Coach: Mohammad Faiz Samsukhidir

Malaysia women's national rugby sevens team
Medal record

Asia Rugby Sevens Trophy
Gold medal – first place	2018 Bandar Seri Begawan	

The Malaysia women's national rugby sevens team represents Malaysia in international rugby sevens. The team is governed by the Malaysia Rugby (Kesatuan Ragbi Malaysia) and competes in regional tournaments overseen by Asia Rugby, including the Asia Rugby Women's Sevens Trophy and the Southeast Asian Games.

== History ==
Women's rugby sevens in Malaysia grew substantially through the 2010s under development programs initiated by Malaysia Rugby to establish a presence at regional multi-sport competitions.

In continental competitions, Malaysia won the second-tier Asia Rugby Women's Sevens Trophy in 2018 in Bandar Seri Begawan, Brunei, securing promotion to the top division for the following season.

At the Southeast Asian Games, the team claimed three consecutive bronze medals in 2015, 2017, and 2019. At the 2025 Southeast Asian Games in Bangkok, the squad recorded their best-ever performance at the regional games by capturing the silver medal, securing pool-stage victories over Singapore, the Philippines, and Indonesia before falling to hosts Thailand in the final.

== Tournament records ==
=== Southeast Asian Games ===
Year	Location	Position
2015	Singapore	(bronze) Bronze medal
2017	Kuala Lumpur, Malaysia	(bronze) Bronze medal
2019	Clark, Philippines	(bronze) Bronze medal
2025	Bangkok, Thailand	(silver) Silver medal

=== Asia Rugby Women's Sevens Trophy ===
Year	Host	Position
2017	Vientiane, Laos	4th place
2018	Bandar Seri Begawan, Brunei	1st place (Champions)
2019	Jakarta, Indonesia	4th place
2021	Doha, Qatar	5th place

== Players ==
=== Squad ===
The following players were called up for recent international competitions:

- Euphrasia Anne Cletus
- Cindy John Pasan
- Fidelia Limang
- Josie Mavcellina Gone
- Valerie Juan
- Ines Sofia
- Wan Zufirah Wan Zulkifli
- Norfarahana Aziz
- Rozliana Mohd Ridwan
- Shaza Bella
- Dayang Anak Manggie
- Siti Farhanah

== See also ==
- Malaysia women's national rugby union team
- Rugby union in Malaysia
