= Kazakhstan women's national rugby sevens team =

Kazakhstan Women's Sevens Team
- Union: Kazakhstan Rugby Union
- Coach: Anna Yakovleva

World Cup Sevens
- Appearances: 0

The Kazakhstan women's national sevens rugby union team is Kazakhstan's representative in Rugby sevens at an international level. They have won the Asia Rugby Women's Sevens Series seven times.

== History ==
Kazakhstan won the 2010 Asia Pacific Sevens Championship in Malaysia. They also won gold at the 2010 Asian Games defeating China in the finals. They finished third at the 2019 Asia Rugby Women's Sevens Olympic Qualifying Tournament earning themselves a place at the 2020 Olympic repechage tournament to compete for one of two final berths in Tokyo.

== Players ==
=== Previous squad ===
Squad at 2010 Asian Games

Squad	Height	Weight	Birthdate/Age
Olga Kumanikina	1.7 m (5 ft 7 in)	67 kg (148 lb)	August 14, 1974 (age 52)
Irina Radzivil	1.65 m (5 ft 5 in)	68 kg (150 lb)	October 27, 1979 (age 47)
Amina Baratova	1.69 m (5 ft 6 1/2 in)	76 kg (168 lb)	September 10, 1982 (age 44)
Olessya Teryayeva	1.7 m (5 ft 7 in)	68 kg (150 lb)	August 8, 1985 (age 41)
Olga Sazonova	1.64 m (5 ft 4 1/2 in)	65 kg (143 lb)	January 24, 1986 (age 40)
Nigora Nurmatova	1.68 m (5 ft 6 in)	72 kg (159 lb)	January 23, 1990 (age 36)
Marianna Balashova	1.71 m (5 ft 7 1/2 in)	65 kg (143 lb)	December 1, 1984 (age 41)
Anna Yakovleva	1.76 m (5 ft 9 1/2 in)	76 kg (168 lb)	November 10, 1983 (age 42)
Svetlana Klyuchnikova	1.61 m (5 ft 3 1/2 in)	61 kg (134 lb)	June 27, 1984 (age 42)
Lyudmila Sherer	1.78 m (5 ft 10 in)	80 kg (180 lb)	June 14, 1988 (age 38)
Irina Amossova	1.69 m (5 ft 6 1/2 in)	69 kg (152 lb)	November 13, 1982 (age 43)
Irina Adler	1.59 m (5 ft 2 1/2 in)	58 kg (128 lb)	November 9, 1978 (age 47)

== Tournament History ==
=== Asian Championship ===
Asia Rugby Women's Sevens Series

- Oceania Rugby Women's Sevens Championship
- Asia Pacific Women’s Sevens Championship
- 2010 Asia Pacific Women's Sevens Championship
- 2012 Asia Pacific Women's Sevens Championship
- Asia Rugby Women's Sevens Series
- es:Asian Sevens Series Femenino
- 2023 Asia Rugby Women's Sevens Series
- 2019 Asia Rugby Women's Sevens Olympic Qualifying Tournament
- 2023 Asia Rugby Women's Sevens Olympic Qualifying Tournament

=== Asian Games ===
Asian Games
Year	Round	Position	Pld	W	L	D
(China) 2010	Final	1st place, gold medalist(s)	6	6	0	0
(South Korea) 2014	Final	3rd place, bronze medalist(s)	6	4	2	0
(Indonesia) 2018	Final	3rd place, bronze medalist(s)	6	4	2	0
Total	1 Title	3/3	18	14	4	0

Rugby sevens at the 2013 Asian Youth Games
