= Thailand women's national rugby sevens team =

Thailand
- Union: Thai Rugby Union
- Coach: Tom Biggs
Team kit

World Cup Sevens
- Appearances: 1 (First in 2009)
- Best result: 13th (2009)

Thailand's women's national rugby sevens team competes at the Asian Games and other sevens tournaments. They featured in the inaugural 2009 Women's Rugby World Cup Sevens in Dubai.

== History ==
Thailand competed at the 2009 Rugby World Cup Sevens and were bronze medalists at the 2010 Asian Games. At the 2018 Asian Games, they reached the semifinals but were beaten by China 29 - 5. They lost to Kazakhstan in the bronze medal final and finished in fourth place.

In 2023, Thailand Rugby Union announced that former Worcester Warriors winger, Tom Biggs, was the new coach for the team. They competed in the 2024 World Rugby Sevens Challenger Series in Dubai; they finished seventh overall in the first round. They finished seventh overall at the 2024 Sevens Challenger Series and missed out on qualifying for the new SVNS Play-off promotion and relegation competition in Madrid.

== Tournament history ==
=== Rugby World Cup Sevens ===
Rugby World Cup Sevens
Year	Round	Position	Pld	W	L	D
(United Arab Emirates) 2009	Bowl Quarterfinalists	13th	4	0	4	0
(Russia) 2013	Did not qualify					
(United States) 2018	Did not qualify					
(South Africa) 2022	Did not qualify					
Total	0 Titles	1/4	4	0	4	0

=== Asian Games ===
Asian Games
Year	Round	Position	Pld	W	D	L
(China) 2010	Bronze medal match	3rd place, bronze medalist(s)	6	4	0	2
(South Korea) 2014	Classification 5th–6th	5th	6	4	0	2
(Indonesia) 2018	Bronze medal match	4th	6	2	0	4
(China) 2022	Bronze medal match	4th	4	1	0	3
Total	0 Titles	4/4	22	11	0	11

== Players ==
Thailand's squad to the 2024 World Rugby Sevens Challenger Series:

No.	Players
1	Panpassa Jaijarim
2	Laksina Nawakaew
4	Jeeraporn Peerabunanon
6	Nantadchaporn Yodya
7	Darin Jantamala
9	Wannaree Meechok
9	Narathip Maneesai
12	Thanaporn Huankid
13	Jutartip Yimyaem
14	Salinda Phaekhwamdee
16	Dion Akwaja
26	Rattanaporn Wittayaronnayut

=== Previous Squads ===
Squad at 2010 Asian Games:

Squad	Height	Weight	Birthdate/Age
Naritsara Worakitsirikun	1.64 m (5 ft 4 1/2 in)	55 kg (121 lb)	November 5, 1990 (age 35)
Prima Jusom	1.60 m (5 ft 3 in)	66 kg (146 lb)	August 11, 1990 (age 36)
Tidarat Sawatnam	1.54 m (5 ft 1/2 in)	45 kg (99 lb)	October 13, 1990 (age 36)
Aoychai Tummawat	1.65 m (5 ft 5 in)	56 kg (123 lb)	August 7, 1990 (age 36)
Rungrat Maineiwklang	1.65 m (5 ft 5 in)	67 kg (148 lb)	February 9, 1987 (age 39)
Piyamat Chomphumee	1.70 m (5 ft 7 in)	62 kg (137 lb)	September 30, 1986 (age 40)
Chitchanok Yusri	1.61 m (5 ft 3 1/2 in)	55 kg (121 lb)	October 29, 1988 (age 38)
Rasamee Sisongkham	1.61 m (5 ft 3 1/2 in)	55 kg (121 lb)	May 19, 1990 (age 36)
Uthumporn Liamrat	1.63 m (5 ft 4 in)	58 kg (128 lb)	May 31, 1986 (age 40)
Butsaya Bunrak	1.69 m (5 ft 6 1/2 in)	64 kg (141 lb)	April 5, 1991 (age 35)
P. Wongwangchan	1.56 m (5 ft 1 1/2 in)	51 kg (112 lb)	February 11, 1981 (age 45)
Jeeraporn Peerabunanon	1.55 m (5 ft 1 in)	50 kg (110 lb)	March 11, 1991 (age 35)
