= Japan women's national rugby sevens team =

Japan
- Union: Japan Rugby Football Union
- Nickname: Sakura Sevens
- Coach: Yuka Kanematsu
- Captain: Chiharu Nakamura
Team kit

World Cup Sevens
- Appearances: 2 (First in 2009)
- Best result: 13th place (2009, 2013)

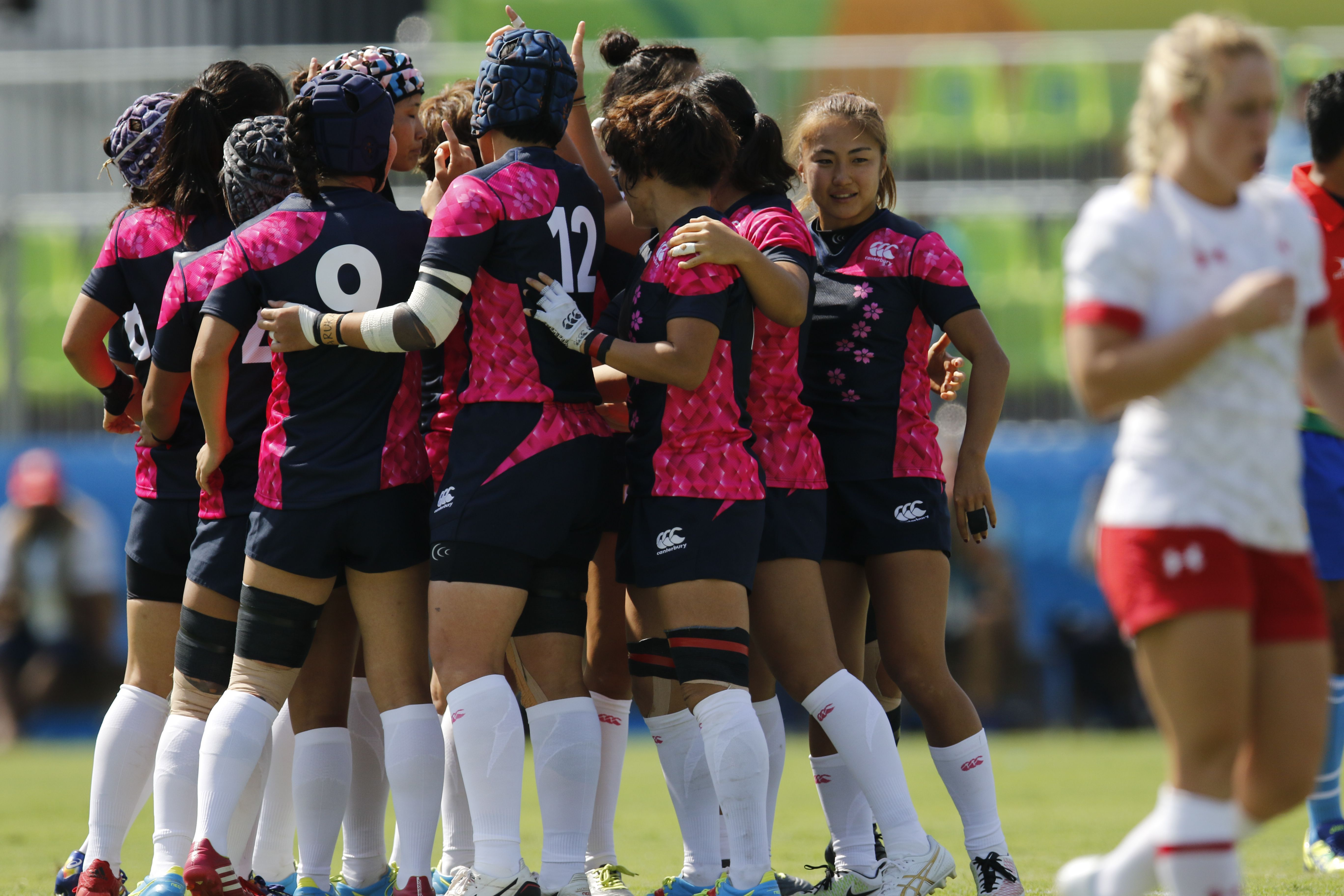
Japan at the 2016 Summer Olympics

The Japan women's national rugby sevens team has competed in competitions such as the Hong Kong Women's Sevens.

In 2012-13 they played two World Series tournaments, placing 13th in China. In the 2013–14 season they placed 7th at São Paulo and 8th at Atlanta. They were not invited to any World Series tournament in 2014–15. Japan played the full 2015–16 World Series, with a best result of 9th at the Dubai Sevens, and finished 11th in the overall standings.

Japan qualified for the 2016 Summer Olympics after winning the 2015 ARFU Women's Sevens Championships. The team won over Kenya but lost twice to Brazil, finishing 10th in the tournament. In 2021, the Sakura's lost all of their five games and finished last at the 2020 Olympics.

== Tournament history ==
A red box around the year indicates tournaments played within the Japan

=== Women's Sevens Series ===
Japan qualified for the 2017-18 World Rugby Women's Sevens by defeating South Africa in the finals of the 2017 Hong Kong Women's Sevens.

=== Summer Olympics ===
Olympic Games record
Year	Round	Position	Pld	W	L	D
(Brazil) 2016	Placement round	10th	5	1	4	0
(Japan) 2020	11th Place Playoff	12th	5	0	5	0
(France) 2024	9th Place Playoff	9th	5	3	2	0
Total	0 Titles	3/3	15	4	11	0

=== Rugby World Cup Sevens ===
Rugby World Cup Sevens
Year	Round	Position	Pld	W	L	D
(United Arab Emirates) 2009	Bowl Quarterfinalists	13th	4	0	4	0
(Russia) 2013	Bowl Quarterfinalists	13th	4	0	4	0
(United States) 2018	Challenge Trophy	10th	2	0	2	0
(South Africa) 2022	Challenge Trophy	9th	4	3	1	0
Total	0 Titles	4/4	14	3	11	0

=== World Rugby Women's Sevens Series ===
Results

1. 2012–13 IRB Women's Sevens World Series
2. 2013–14 IRB Women's Sevens World Series
3. 2014–15 World Rugby Women's Sevens Series
4. 2015–16 World Rugby Women's Sevens Series
5. 2016–17 World Rugby Women's Sevens Series
6. 2017–18 World Rugby Women's Sevens Series
7. 2018–19 World Rugby Women's Sevens Series
8. 2019–20 World Rugby Women's Sevens Series
9. 2021–22 World Rugby Women's Sevens Series
10. 2022–23 World Rugby Women's Sevens Series
11. 2023–24 SVNS

== Players ==
=== Current squad ===
2023–24 Series
Player	Date of birth (age)	Matches	Points
Sakura Mizutani	13 December 2003 (age 22)	54	40
Emii Tanaka	19 October 1999 (age 26)	45	42
Arisa Nishi	29 May 2004 (age 22)	4	10
Seika Ohashi	22 May 2004 (age 22)	3	0
Mayu Yoshino	23 June 2001 (age 24)	21	5
Raichelmiyo Bativakalolo	18 September 1997 (age 28)	52	80
Fumio Ohtake	2 February 1999 (age 27)	58	75
Mio Yamanaka	27 October 1995 (age 30)	56	42
Hanako Utsumi	16 March 2000 (age 26)	15	14
Sakurako Yazaki	19 January 2004 (age 22)	4	5
Wakaba Hara	6 January 2000 (age 26)	65	230
Yukino Tsujisaki	21 June 1994 (age 31)	26	30
Chiharu Nakamura	25 April 1988 (age 38)	169	225

=== Award winners ===
The following Japan Sevens players have been recognised at the World Rugby Awards since 2013:

World Rugby Women's 7s Dream Team
Year	No.	Player
2025	3.	Marin Kajiki
