= Singapore women's national rugby sevens team =

Singapore
- Union: Singapore Rugby Union
- Founded: 1997
- Coach: Gene Tzee Meng Tong
- Captain: Gek Sie Eunice Tay

World Cup Sevens
- Appearances: 0

The Singapore women's national sevens rugby union team is Singapore's national representative in Rugby sevens. They competed at the 2017 and 2018 Asia Rugby Women's Sevens Series.

== History ==
The history of women's rugby in Singapore has been a short one. The game was introduced by the Singapore Rugby Union through the men's clubs in 1996. The first Singapore women's national 7s team was formed in 1997 and they represented the republic at the Hong Kong International Women's 7s and the inaugural Asian Women's Championship 7s in the same year.

Since then, the Singapore women's national 7s team has grown from strength to strength. One of their significant wins includes becoming plate winners in the Hong Kong International Women's 7s in 2003. Within Asia, the team achieved its highest ranking in 2004, when it became 2nd in Asia behind Kazakhstan in the Asian Women's Championship 7s held in Almaty. The team retained their top three placing the next year when the Asian Women's Championship 7s was hosted in Singapore.

As an indication of the growth of the game in the region, women's rugby was included for the first time in the South East Asian Games 2007 in Korat, Thailand, and the Singapore Women's 7s team took the silver medal ahead of Cambodia and Laos.

== Players ==
=== Recent Squad ===
Squad at 2010 Asian Games:

Squad	Height	Weight	Birthdate/Age
Angelina Liu	1.61 m (5 ft 3 1/2 in)	55 kg (121 lb)	February 10, 1982 (age 44)
Baoling Teo	1.65 m (5 ft 5 in)	52 kg (115 lb)	October 14, 1987 (age 39)
Priscilla Humphries	1.57 m (5 ft 2 in)	56 kg (123 lb)	September 2, 1981 (age 45)
Sophie Gollifer	1.68 m (5 ft 6 in)	56 kg (123 lb)	October 8, 1989 (age 37)
Ming Li Teo	1.58 m (5 ft 2 in)	54 kg (119 lb)	June 7, 1990 (age 36)
Shao Ing Wang	1.65 m (5 ft 5 in)	60 kg (130 lb)	February 22, 1977 (age 49)
Yilin Wong	1.68 m (5 ft 6 in)	60 kg (130 lb)	December 1, 1988 (age 37)
Gek Sie Eunice Tay (c)	1.6 m (5 ft 3 in)	58 kg (128 lb)	August 31, 1979 (age 47)
Sei Yin Fong	1.64 m (5 ft 4 1/2 in)	60 kg (130 lb)	June 15, 1976 (age 50)
Jialing Chua	1.62 m (5 ft 4 in)	58 kg (128 lb)	April 25, 1984 (age 42)
Hui Juan Tan	1.63 m (5 ft 4 in)	64 kg (141 lb)	September 18, 1987 (age 39)
Wai Mun Leung	1.69 m (5 ft 6 1/2 in)	63 kg (139 lb)	October 16, 1979 (age 47)

== Asian Games ==
Asian Games
Year	Round	Position	Pld	W	L	D
(China) 2010	5th Place Final	6th	6	2	4	0
(South Korea) 2014	5th Place Final	6th	6	3	3	0
(Indonesia) 2018	5th Place Final	6th	6	2	4	0
Total	0 Title	3/3	18	7	11	0
