= China women's national rugby sevens team =

China
- Union: Chinese Rugby Football Association
- Coach: Lu Zhuan

World Cup Sevens
- Appearances: 4 (First in 2009)
- Best result: 9th (2009)

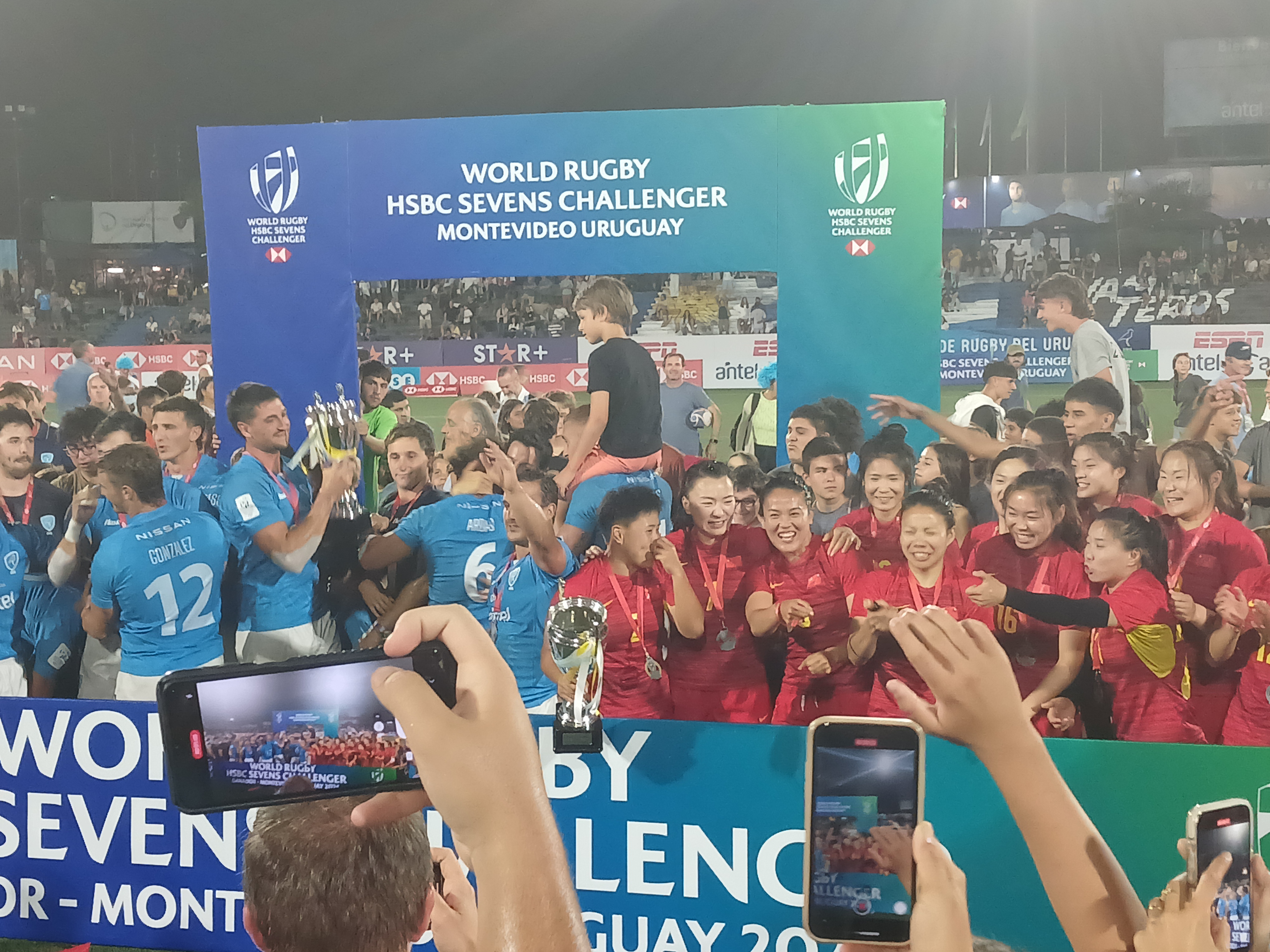
Celebrations at the Sevens Challenger Montevideo

The Chinese women's national sevens rugby union team represents China in Rugby sevens at an international level. They have competed in the Rugby World Cup Sevens since the women's inaugural tournament in 2009, and have also competed at the Summer Olympics, making their debut in Tokyo in 2020.

== History ==
China were the 2014 Asian women's sevens champions. They qualified for the 2018 Rugby World Cup Sevens after finishing the 2017 Asia Rugby Women's Sevens Series in second place, they placed 12th overall at the World Cup.

China qualified for the 2020 Olympics at the 2019 Asia Rugby Women's Sevens Olympic Qualifying Tournament.

=== 2024 ===
In 2024, they participated in the World Rugby Sevens Challenger Series; they won the first round of the series which took place in Dubai. They also won the second leg that was held in Montevideo, Uruguay in March. China was crowned 2024 Sevens Challenger Series Champions after winning the final leg in Kraków; they secured their place at the new SVNS Play-off promotion and relegation competition in Madrid.

== Tournament history ==
=== Rugby World Cup Sevens ===
Rugby World Cup Sevens
Year	Round	Position	Pld	W	L	D
(United Arab Emirates) 2009	Bowl Winners	9th	6	4	2	0
(Russia) 2013	Bowl Semifinalists	11th	5	1	4	0
(United States) 2018	Challenge Trophy Semifinalists	12th	4	1	3	0
(South Africa) 2022	13th-place Final	13th	4	2	2	0
Total	0 Titles	4/4	19	8	11	0

=== Summer Olympics ===
Olympic Games record
Year	Round	Position	Pld	W	L	D
(Brazil) 2016	Did not qualify					
(Japan) 2020	7th place match	7th	6	2	4	0
(France) 2024	5th place match	6th	6	2	4	0
Total	0 Titles	2/3	12	4	8	0

=== Women's SVNS ===
Results

1. 2012–13 IRB Women's Sevens World Series
2. 2013–14 IRB Women's Sevens World Series
3. 2014–15 World Rugby Women's Sevens Series
4. 2015–16 World Rugby Women's Sevens Series
5. 2016–17 World Rugby Women's Sevens Series
6. 2017–18 World Rugby Women's Sevens Series
7. 2018–19 World Rugby Women's Sevens Series
8. 2019–20 World Rugby Women's Sevens Series
9. 2021–22 World Rugby Women's Sevens Series
10. 2022–23 World Rugby Women's Sevens Series
11. 2023–24 SVNS

=== Asian Games ===
Asian Games
Year	Round	Position	Pld	W	L	D
(China) 2010	Final	2nd place, silver medalist(s)	6	5	1	0
(South Korea) 2014	Final	1st place, gold medalist(s)	6	6	0	0
(Indonesia) 2018	Final	2nd place, silver medalist(s)	6	5	1	0
(China) 2022	Final	1st place, gold medalist(s)	4	4	0	0
Total	2 Title	4/4	22	20	2	0

== Players ==
=== Current squad ===
China's squad to the 2024 World Rugby Sevens Challenger Series:

No.	Players
2	Yan Meiling
5	Gu Yaoyao
7	Chen Keyi
11	Liu Xiaoqian
12	Yu Hu
15	Dou Xinrong
16	Sun Yue
17	Gao Yueying
18	Su Qi
23	Kang Chengtian
28	Ma Xiaodan
30	Wang Zhaojing
