= Hong Kong women's national rugby sevens team =

Hong Kong
- Union: Hong Kong Rugby Union
- Coach: Andy Vilk
- Captain: Melody Li
Team kit

The Hong Kong women's sevens rugby union team represents Hong Kong at an international level and plays at the Hong Kong Women's Sevens and other international sevens tournaments.

== History ==
Hong Kong competed at the 2020 Women's Rugby Sevens Final Olympic Qualification Tournament in Monaco. They were beaten by France in the finals 51–0 and missed out on qualifying for Tokyo 2020.

Hong Kong participated in the 2024 World Rugby Sevens Challenger Series in Dubai; they finished tenth overall in the first round. They finished ninth overall at the 2024 Sevens Challenger Series.

== Current squad ==
Hong Kong China's squad to the 2024 World Rugby Sevens Challenger Series:

No.	Players
2	Chloe Chan
3	Au Yeung Sin Yi
5	Nam Ka Man
6	Natasha Olson-Thorne
7	Melody Li
9	Jessica Ho
10	Vivian Poon
11	Chong Ka Yan
14	Gabriella Rivers
18	Mba Oyana Julia Mibuy
19	Sabay Lynam
21	Agnes Chan

== Tournament History ==
=== Asian Games ===
Asian Games
Year	Round	Position	Pld	W	L	D
(China) 2010	Bronze Medal Final	4th	6	2	4	0
(South Korea) 2014	Bronze Medal Final	4th	6	4	2	0
(Indonesia) 2018	Classification 5th–6th	5th	6	4	2	0
(China) 2022	Bronze Medal Final	3rd	6	2	4	0
(Japan) 2026	Bronze Medal Final	3rd	5	3	2	0
Total	0 Title	5/5	29	15	14	0

== Achievements ==
- Darwin Sevens Tournament: 1st Place
- Hong Kong 7s 2014: 9th Place
- Women's World Series Qualifier 2014: 9th Place
- Asian Sevens Series Hong Kong 2014: 2nd Place
- Asian Sevens Series Beijing 2014: 3rd Place
- Asian Sevens Series 2014 Overall Placing: 3rd Place
- Margaret River 7s Tournament 2015: 1st Place
- Borneo Sevens 2015: 4th Place
- Hong Kong 7s 2015: 4th Place
- World Series Qualifier Dublin 2015: 6th Place
- Asian Sevens Series Qingdao 2015: 1st Place
- Asian Games 2022 Hangzhou (played in 2023): 3rd Place (Bronze Medallists)
- Asian Games 2026 Aichi–Nagoya: 3rd Place (Bronze Medallists)
