= Tuvalu women's national rugby sevens team =

Tuvalu
- Union: Tuvalu Rugby Union
Team kit

First international
- Australia 58–0 Nauru (9 November 2018)

World Cup Sevens
- Appearances: 0

The Tuvalu women's national rugby sevens team represents Tuvalu in women's rugby sevens. They compete in the Pacific Games and the Oceania Rugby Women's Sevens Championship.

== History ==
In 2018, Nauru competed in the Brisvegas Rugby 7s competition that was held in Toowong, Queensland. They made their international debut at the 2018 Oceania Sevens Championship in Fiji, and finished in eighth place. They also participated in the 2019 tournament that was also hosted by Fiji.

They competed at the 2023 Oceania Sevens tournament in Brisbane. They lost all five of their matches and finished tenth overall. They participated in the Pacific Games in the Solomon Islands.

== Players ==
Squad to the 2023 Pacific Games:

Players
Bonnia Agege
Vashti Agege
Naomi Akua
Thrixeena Akua
Ashleigh Debao
Tailey Ephraim
Lovani Jeremiah
Ivy Rose Jones
Osanna Belana Scotty
Rose Ismeria Scotty
Jaya Shalimar Teboua
Helen Whippy

== Tournament History ==
=== Pacific Games ===
Pacific Games
Year	Round	Position	Pld	W	D	L
(New Caledonia) 2011	Did Not Compete					
(Papua New Guinea) 2015	Did Not Compete					
(Samoa) 2019	5th Place Play-off	6th	6	2	0	4
(Solomon Islands) 2023	7th Place Play-off	8th	5	0	0	5
Total	0 Titles	2/4	11	2	0	9

=== Oceania Women's Sevens ===
Oceania Women's Sevens
Year	Round	Position	Pld	W	D	L
2007–17	Did Not Compete					
(Fiji) 2018	7th Place Play-off	8th	5	0	0	5
(Fiji) 2019	11th Place Play-off	12th	4	1	0	3
(Australia) 2021	Did Not Compete					
(New Zealand) 2022	Did Not Compete					
(Australia) 2023	9th Place Play-off	10th	5	0	0	5
Total	0 Titles	3/13	14	1	0	13
