= Rugby sevens at the 2015 Pacific Games =

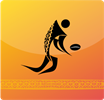
- Rugby 7's pictogram for the Games
- Venue: Sir John Guise Stadium
- Location: Port Moresby
- Dates: 8–10 July 2015
- Competitors: 204 from 11 nations

Rugby sevens at the 2015 Pacific Games was held from 8–10 July at the Sir John Guise Stadium. In the men's tournament Fiji won the gold medal defeating defending champions Samoa by a 26 point margin in the final. Tonga took the bronze medal. Fiji also won the women's tournament, defeating Australia by a successful try conversion in the final, with hosts Papua New Guinea winning the bronze medal.

== Events ==
=== Medal table ===
Rank	Nation	Gold	Silver	Bronze	Total
1	Fiji	2	0	0	2
2	Australia	0	1	0	1
2	Samoa	0	1	0	1
4	Papua New Guinea	0	0	1	1
4	Tonga	0	0	1	1
Totals (5 entries)		2	2	2	6

=== Medalists ===
Event	Gold	Silver	Bronze	Refs
Men	(Fiji) Fiji; Abele Atunaisa; Kitione Dawai; Aisake Katonibau; Manueli Lagai; Viliame Mata; Emosi Mulevoro; Amenoni Nasilasila; Keponi Paul; Vatemo Ravouvou; Savenaca Rawaca; Jasa Veremalua; Sitiveni Waqa	(Samoa) Samoa; Levi Asifaamatala; Siaosi Asofolau; Etiuefa Fiavaai; Lio Lolo; Xavier Martel; Tila Mealoi; Iafeta Purcell; Jack Saena; Fa'alemiga Selesele; Fale Sooialo; Alefosio Tapili; Lafaele Vaa; Brando Vaaulu	(Tonga) Tonga; Samisoni Asi; Atunaisa Fakaosi; Fetuu Finau; Sione Fusimalohi; William Hafu; Kotoni Lotoa; Filivalea Mafoa; Vaea Poteki; Siale Talakai; Richard Taliauli; Manu Tuifua; Meiohihifo Kuli	
Women	(Fiji) Fiji; Rusila Nagasau; Litia Naiqato; Elina Ratauluva; Akosita Ravato; Timaima Ravisa; Ana Maria Roqica; Asinate Savu; Rusila Tamoi; Timaima Tamoi; Lavenia Tinai; Luisa Tisolo; Talica Vodo	(Australia) Australia; Brooke Anderson; Nicole Beck; Dominique Du Toit; Nikki Etheridge; Georgina Friedrichs; Mollie Gray; Sarah Halvorsen; Mahalia Murphy; Taleena Simon; Tanisha Stanton; Laura Waldie; Brooke Walker	(Papua New Guinea) Papua New Guinea; Naomi Alapi; Alice Alois; Dulcie Bomai; Menda Ipat; Amelia Kuk; Lynette Kwarula; Joanne Lagona; Geua Larry; Kymlie Rapilla; Trisilla Rema; Cassandra Sampson; Freda Waula	

== Participating teams ==
Ten men's teams and seven women's teams played in the respective tournaments:

Men:

- Fiji
- Guam
- Nauru
- New Caledonia
- Papua New Guinea
- Samoa
- Solomon Islands
- Tahiti
- Tonga
- Vanuatu

Women:

- Australia
- Fiji
- New Caledonia
- Papua New Guinea
- Samoa
- Tahiti
- Tonga

== See also ==
- Rugby sevens at the Pacific Games
