= 2018 Rugby World Cup Sevens qualifying – Women =

This is the qualifications of the 2018 Rugby World Cup Sevens – Women's tournament aimed at selecting women's Rugby sevens national teams that appeared in the finals in San Francisco. A total of 52 nations took part in the qualifying process.

== General ==
The tournament is organized by World Rugby to be held on 20–22 July 2018, with sixteen teams in attendance. Automatic qualification is extended the semi-finalists of the previous World Cup (of which host United States is one). Four other bids were determined by placement in the 2016-17 World Rugby Women's Sevens Series, with the remainder decided in each of the six regions' respective tournaments.

== Qualified teams ==
Africa	North America	South America	Asia	Europe	Oceania
Automatic qualification
	Canada; United States			Spain	New Zealand
2016–17 World Series
				France; Russia	Australia; Fiji
Regional Qualifiers
South Africa	Mexico	Brazil	China; Japan	England; Ireland	Papua New Guinea

== Qualifying ==
Legend
Qualified to 2018 Rugby World Cup Sevens
Already qualified

=== Africa ===
The tournament was held 16–17 September 2017 in Monastir, Tunisia, with South Africa beating Kenya 17–12 to obtain the one allotted Africa slot for the World Cup.

Rank	Team
1st place, gold medalist(s)	South Africa
2nd place, silver medalist(s)	Kenya
3rd place, bronze medalist(s)	Tunisia
4	Uganda
5	Madagascar
6	Senegal
7	Zimbabwe
8	Morocco

=== Americas North ===
The qualifying Tournament, which is also Rugby Americas North Women's Sevens, took place at the Campo Marte in Mexico City, 25–26 November 2017. With Mexico having the best record, it will make its first World Cup appearance.

Rank	Team
1st place, gold medalist(s)	Mexico
2nd place, silver medalist(s)	French Guiana
3rd place, bronze medalist(s)	Jamaica
4	Trinidad and Tobago
5	Guyana
6	Dominican Republic
7	Bermuda

=== South America ===
The 2017 Torneo Valentín Martínez served as the South American qualifier, with the winner heading to the World Cup. It was held at Carrasco Polo Club in Montevideo, Uruguay on November 10-11.

Rank	Team	Pld	W	D	L	PF	PA	+/−	Pts
1st place, gold medalist(s)	Brazil	6	6	0	0	240	17	+223	18
2nd place, silver medalist(s)	Argentina	6	5	0	1	197	32	+167	16
3rd place, bronze medalist(s)	Peru	6	4	0	2	75	104	−29	14
4	Paraguay	6	3	0	3	131	89	+42	12
5	Uruguay	6	2	0	4	62	118	−56	10
6	Chile	6	1	0	5	31	200	−169	8
7	Costa Rica	6	0	0	6	10	188	−178	6

=== Asia ===
From 23–24 September and 14–15 October, eight teams competed in Incheon and Colombo for two world cup slots.

Rank	Team	Korea	Sri Lanka	Points
1st place, gold medalist(s)	Japan	12	12	24
2nd place, silver medalist(s)	China	10	10	20
3rd place, bronze medalist(s)	Kazakhstan	8	8	16
4	Hong Kong	7	5	12
5	Thailand	4	7	11
6	Sri Lanka	5	4	9
7	Singapore	2	2	4
8	South Korea	1	1	2

=== Europe ===
Twelve teams competed at the Rugby Europe Women's Sevens Grand Prix at 17–18 June 2017 in Malemort, France, then 8–9 July in Kazan, Russia.

Rank	Team	Malemort	Kazan	Points
1st place, gold medalist(s)	Russia	20	20	40
2nd place, silver medalist(s)	Ireland	16	16	32
3rd place, bronze medalist(s)	France	18	14	32
4	England	14	18	32
5	Wales	10	12	22
6	Spain	12	3	15
7	Belgium	6	8	14
8	Poland	3	10	13
9	Italy	8	1	9
10	Portugal	2	6	8
11	Sweden	4	2	6
12	Netherlands	1	4	5

=== Oceania ===
Eight teams competed in Suva, Fiji on 10-11 November 2017, with Australia, Fiji and New Zealand already qualified. Papua New Guinea, as the highest-ranked team not yet qualified, was eligible.

Rank	Team
1st place, gold medalist(s)	New Zealand
2nd place, silver medalist(s)	Australia
3rd place, bronze medalist(s)	Fiji
4	Papua New Guinea
5	Cook Islands; Samoa
7	Tahiti; Tonga
