= 2024 Oceania Women's Sevens Championship =

Women's rugby sevens tournament in Solomon Islands

- Host nation: Solomon Islands
- Date: 7–8 December 2024

Cup
- Champion: Fiji Development
- Runner-up: Samoa
- Third: Tonga

Tournament details
- Matches played: 21

The 2024 Oceania Women's Sevens Championship was the thirteenth Oceania Women's Sevens for Oceania women's teams and was held at the National Stadium in Honiara, Solomon Islands from 7 to 8 December. Teams competed to qualify for a spot in the World Rugby Sevens Challenger Series.

The Fiji Development team defeated Samoa in the final to win the tournament. As Fiji were already in the SVNS series, Samoa as runners-up qualified for the 2025 World Rugby Sevens Challenger Series.

== Teams ==
Nine women's national teams competed in the tournament:

- American Samoa
- Cook Islands
- Fiji Development
- Kiribati
- Niue
- Samoa
- Solomon Islands
- Tonga
- Vanuatu

== Format ==
Teams were seeded into three pools of three teams. The top two teams from each group alongside the top two third ranked teams advanced to the quarter-finals. The highest-ranked non-2024–25 SVNS team would secure a spot in the World Rugby Challenger Series.

== Pool stage ==
=== Pool A ===
Pos	Team	P	W	D	L	PF	PA	PD	Pts	Qualification
1	Fiji Development	2	2	0	0	85	0	+85	4	Advance to quarter-finals
2	Solomon Islands	2	1	0	1	17	44	–27	2	Advance to quarter-finals
3	Vanuatu	2	0	0	2	5	63	–58	0	Advance to quarter-finals

7 December

Fiji	46–0	Vanuatu

National Stadium, Honiara

7 December

Solomon Islands	17–5	Vanuatu

National Stadium, Honiara

7 December

Fiji	39–0	Solomon Islands

National Stadium, Honiara

=== Pool B ===
Pos	Team	P	W	D	L	PF	PA	PD	Pts	Qualification
1	Samoa	2	2	0	0	94	5	+89	4	Advance to quarter-finals
2	Niue	2	1	0	0	29	53	–24	2	Advance to quarter-finals
3	American Samoa	2	0	0	2	12	77	–65	0	Advance to quarter-finals

7 December

Samoa	46–0	Niue

National Stadium, Honiara

7 December

American Samoa	7–29	Niue

National Stadium, Honiara

7 December

Samoa	48–5	American Samoa

National Stadium, Honiara

=== Pool C ===
Pos	Team	P	W	D	L	PF	PA	PD	Pts	Qualification
1	Tonga	2	2	0	0	85	0	+85	4	Advance to quarter-finals
2	Cook Islands	2	1	0	0	59	31	+28	2	Advance to quarter-finals
3	Kiribati	2	0	0	2	0	113	–113	0	Eliminated

7 December

Tonga	54–0	Kiribati

National Stadium, Honiara

7 December

Cook Islands	59–0	Kiribati

National Stadium, Honiara

7 December

Tonga	31–0	Cook Islands

National Stadium, Honiara

== Knockout stage ==
=== 5th–8th Semi-final ===
Semi-finals
8 December – National Stadium
Niue	31
Vanuatu	5
8 December – National Stadium
Cook Islands	43
American Samoa	0

5th Place Final
8 December – National Stadium
Cook Islands	26
Niue	0
7th Place
8 December – National Stadium
American Samoa	29
Vanuatu	0

=== Quarter-finals ===
Quarter-finals
8 December – National Stadium
Tonga	43
Niue	0
8 December – National Stadium
Fiji Dev.	48
Vanuatu	0
8 December – National Stadium
Cook Islands	0
Solomon Islands	15
8 December – National Stadium
Samoa	50
American Samoa	0

Semi-finals
8 December – National Stadium
Tonga	5
Fiji Dev.	36
8 December – National Stadium
Solomon Islands	0
Samoa	24

Cup Final
8 December – National Stadium
Fiji Dev.	14
Samoa	5
3rd Place
8 December – National Stadium
Tonga	41
Solomon Islands	5

== Placings ==
Rank	Team
1st place, gold medalist(s)	Fiji Development
2nd place, silver medalist(s)	Samoa
3rd place, bronze medalist(s)	Tonga
4	Solomon Islands
5	Cook Islands
6	Niue
7	American Samoa
8	Vanuatu
9	Kiribati
