= Lavenia Tinai =

Fijian rugby union player (born 1990)

- Born: September 7, 1990 (age 36)
- Height: 1.65 m (5 ft 5 in)
- Weight: 57 kg (126 lb; 9 st 0 lb)

Rugby union career
National sevens team
Years	Team	Comps
2012-Present	Fiji	
Medal record
Representing Fiji
Women's rugby sevens
Summer Olympics
Bronze medal – third place	2020 Tokyo	Team competition
Commonwealth Games
Silver medal – second place	2022 Birmingham	Team competition
Pacific Games
Gold medal – first place	2015 Port Moresby	Team competition
Gold medal – first place	2019 Apia	Team competition
Gold medal – first place	2023 Honiara	Team competition

Lavenia Tinai (born September 7, 1990) is a Fijian rugby union player. She represents Fiji in rugby sevens and made her debut in 2012. She was selected to represent Fiji at the 2016 Summer Olympics as a member of the Fiji women's sevens team. She is the sister of former Fiji 7's rep, Ilai Tinai.

Tinai competed for Fiji in rugby sevens at the 2020 Summer Olympics and won a bronze medal at the event. She was part of the Fijiana sevens team that won the silver medal at the 2022 Commonwealth Games in Birmingham. She later competed at the Rugby World Cup Sevens in Cape Town.
