= Tahiti women's national rugby sevens team =

Tahiti
- Union: Tahiti Rugby Union
Team kit

Largest defeat
- Australia 59–0 Tahiti (8 July 2015, Pacific Games)

World Cup Sevens
- Appearances: 0

The Tahiti women's national sevens rugby union team is Tahiti's national representative in Rugby sevens. Tahiti competes in the Pacific Games since the introduction of women's rugby sevens in the 2011 Pacific Games in New Caledonia.

== Background ==
Tahiti competed at the 2011 Pacific Games in Nouméa. They played six games in the preliminary rounds, losing four and drawing twice with Cook Islands and Guam; They finished in 7th place overall. At the 2015 Pacific Games Tahiti lost all of their matches and finished in last place.

Tahiti made their only Oceania Championship appearance at the 2017 tournament that was held in Fiji.

== Current squad ==
Squad to 2015 Pacific Games:

- Remini Nawei
- Teuira Hanaley
- Tokoragi Raitiare Tihan
- Huchede Eva
- Frogier Vainui
- Hurahutia Maruiata
- Cloe Devaluez
- Herenui Tehuiotoa
- Mooria Toimata
- Teriinohopuaiterai Meihiti
- Anais Heimata Temarii
- Florine Tevero

=== Previous Squads ===
2011 Pacific Games Squad
- Mereana Mou Fat
- Herenui Tehuiotoa
- Hanaley Teuira
- Anais Heimata Temarii
- Isabelle Pito
- Eva Eupea e Pito
- Monique Moeata Tokoragi
- Madeleine Tehaameamea
- Florine Tevero
- Daiana Teuru
- Marthe Tevero
- Eliana Taiti

== Tournament History ==
=== Pacific Games ===
Pacific Games
Year	Round	Position	Pld	W	D	L
(New Caledonia) 2011	Seventh place knockout	7th	7	0	2	5
(Papua New Guinea) 2015	Pool Stage	7th	6	0	0	6
(Samoa) 2019	Did Not Compete					
(Solomon Islands) 2023	TBD					
Total	0 Titles	2/3	13	0	2	11

=== Oceania Women's Sevens ===
Oceania Women's Sevens
Year	Round	Position	Pld	W	D	L
2007–16	Did Not Compete					
(Fiji) 2017	5th–8th Place Semifinal	7th	4	0	0	4
(Fiji) 2018	Did Not Compete					
(Fiji) 2019	Did Not Compete					
(Australia) 2021	Did Not Compete					
(New Zealand) 2022	Did Not Compete					
(Australia) 2023	Did Not Compete					
Total	0 Titles	1/13	4	0	0	4

== See also ==
- Rugby union in Tahiti
