= Oceania Rugby Women's Sevens Championship =

Regional women's rugby sevens championship

- Current season, competition or edition: 2024 Oceania Women's Sevens Championship
- Sport: Rugby sevens
- Founded: 2007; 19 years ago
- Countries: 9 (in 2024)
- Most recent champion: Fiji (2024)
- Most titles: Australia (6 titles)

The Oceania Rugby Women's Sevens Championship is the regional championship for women's international rugby sevens in Oceania. The tournament is held over two days, typically on a weekend. It is sanctioned and sponsored by Oceania Rugby, which is the rugby union governing body for the region.

The first official regional 7s championship for international women's teams from Oceania was the Pacific tournament held in Port Moresby in 2007. This was followed by the Oceania Championship in 2008.

The Oceania Rugby Women's Sevens serves as a qualification tournament for the following:

- World Rugby Sevens Challenger Series
- Rugby World Cup Sevens
- Olympic Games
- Commonwealth Games

== Tournaments Summary ==
=== Results by year ===
Year	Venue	Winner	Runner-up	Refs
Pacific 7s
2007	(Papua New Guinea) Port Moresby	Fiji	Samoa	
Oceania 7s
2008	(Samoa) Apia	Australia	New Zealand	
2012	(Fiji) Lautoka	New Zealand	Australia	
2013	(Australia) Noosa	Australia	Fiji	
2014	(Australia) Noosa	New Zealand	Australia	
2015	(New Zealand) Auckland	Fiji	Samoa	
2016	(Fiji) Suva	Australia	Fiji	
2017	(Fiji) Suva	New Zealand	Australia	
2018	(Fiji) Suva	Australia	New Zealand	
2019	(Fiji) Suva	Australia	Fiji	
2020	No tournament			
2021	(Australia) Townsville	New Zealand	Australia	
2022	(New Zealand) Pukekohe	New Zealand	Australia	
2023	(Australia) Brisbane	Australia	Fiji	
2024	(Solomon Islands) Honiara	Fiji	Samoa	

=== Participating teams results ===
Teams competing in the Oceania Women's Sevens and their finishing positions are as follows:

Team	07	08	12	13	14	15	16	17	18	19	21	22	23	24
Oceania teams
American Samoa	–	–	–	–	–	–	–	–	–	–	–	–	8	7
Australia	–	1	2	1	2	–	1	2	1	1	2	2	1	–
Cook Islands	–	–	7	–	6	3	4	5*	6	9	–	–	7	5
Fiji	1	3	3	2	3	1	2	3	3	2	3	3	2	1
Kiribati	–	–	–	–	–	–	–	–	–	–	–	–	–	9
Nauru	–	–	–	–	–	–	–	–	8	12	–	–	10	–
New Caledonia	–	–	–	–	–	–	–	–	7	–	–	–	–	–
New Zealand	–	2	1	3	1	–	–	1	2	3	1	1 †	3	–
Niue	4	5	–	–	–	–	–	–	–	–	–	–	–	6
Papua New Guinea	3	–	4	5	5	4	3	4	4	4	–	–	4	–
Samoa	2	4	5	4	4	2	5	5*	5	5	–	–	5	2
Solomon Islands	–	–	8	–	–	–	7	–	–	6	–	–	9	4
Tahiti	–	–	–	–	–	–	–	7*	–	–	–	–	–	–
Tonga	–	–	6	–	7	5	6	7*	–	11	–	–	6	3
Vanuatu	–	–	–	–	–	–	–	–	–	10	–	–	–	8
Invited teams
Canada	–	–	–	–	–	–	–	–	–	7	–	–	–	–
Japan	–	–	–	–	–	–	–	–	–	8	–	–	–	–
Oceania Barbarians	–	–	–	–	–	–	–	–	–	–	4	–	–	–
Number of teams	4	5	8	5	7	5	7	8	8	12	4	4	10	9

Notes:

- Host nations are highlighted in red.
- (*) Asterisk indicates a shared placing.
- (†) New Zealand fielded two teams, Black Ferns Ma, and Black Ferns Pango who finished in first and fourth place respectively.

=== Asia Pacific Women’s Sevens Championship ===
Year	Host	Winner
2010	Malaysia	Kazakhstan
2011	Malaysia	Papua New Guinea
2012	Malaysia	Australia
2013	China	China
2015	Malaysia	Japan

== See also ==
- Oceania Rugby Men's Sevens Championship
