= Rugby sevens at the 2011 Pacific Games =

2011 Pacific Games Rugby 7s
Tournament details
- Host nation: 2011 Pacific Games Rugby 7s
- Venue: Stade Numa-Daly Magenta, Nouméa
- Dates: 31 August – 2 September 2011
- No. of nations: 12 (men); 7 (women)

Final positions
- Champions: Samoa (men); Fiji (women)

Rugby sevens at the 2011 Pacific Games was held from August 31–September 2, 2011 at several venues.

== Events ==
=== Medal table ===
Rank	Nation	Gold	Silver	Bronze	Total
1	Fiji	1	1	0	2
1	Samoa	1	1	0	2
3	Papua New Guinea	0	0	2	2
Totals (3 entries)		2	2	2	6

=== Medal summary ===
Event	Gold	Silver	Bronze
Men	Samoa	Fiji	Papua New Guinea
Women	Fiji	Samoa	Papua New Guinea

== See also ==
- Rugby sevens at the Pacific Games
