= Wallis and Futuna women's national rugby sevens team =

Wallis and Futuna
- Union: Wallis and Futuna Rugby Committee
- Coach: Sailosi Nawavu

First international
- Fiji 29–0 Wallis and Futuna (23 November 2023)

Largest win
- Cook Islands 12–22 Wallis-Futuna (24 November 2023)

The Wallis and Futuna women's national rugby sevens team is a minor sporting side that represents Wallis and Futuna in Rugby sevens. They competed at the 2023 Pacific Games.

== History ==
Wallis and Futuna first competed at the 2023 Pacific Games in the Solomon Islands. They lost their opening game to Fiji but later won their first match against the Cook Islands with a score of 22–12. They defeated Tonga in the third place playoff and claimed the bronze medal.

== Players ==
Squad to the 2023 Pacific Games:

Players
Malia Fakailo
Marlencka Feleu
Teani Feleu
Nathalie Fiafialoto
Rose Marie Fiafialoto
Taina Maka
Filihigoa Maluia
Anemone Mulikihaamea
Emma Receveur
Aneymone Talalua
Eleanore Tialetagi

== Tournament History ==
=== Pacific Games ===
Pacific Games
Year	Round	Position	Pld	W	D	L
(New Caledonia) 2011	Did Not Compete					
(Papua New Guinea) 2015	Did Not Compete					
(Samoa) 2019	Did Not Compete					
(Solomon Islands) 2023	Bronze Final	3rd place, bronze medalist(s)	5	3	0	2
Total	0 Titles	1/4	5	3	0	2

== See also ==
- Wallis and Futuna Rugby Committee
- Rugby union in Wallis and Futuna
- Rugby union in France
