= 2010 Asia Pacific Women's Sevens Championship =

2010 Asia Pacific Women’s Sevens Championship
- Host nation: Malaysia
- Date: 29–31 October 2010

Cup
- Champion: Kazakhstan
- Runner-up: Papua New Guinea
- Third: Cook Islands

Tournament details
- Matches played: 18

The 2010 Asia Pacific Women’s Sevens Championship was held at Kota Kinabalu in Malaysia from 29 to 31 October 2010. Kazakhstan won the tournament after beating Papua New Guinea in the Cup final.

== Teams ==
Seven teams competed at the tournament:

- Cook Islands
- India
- Kazakhstan
- Papua New Guinea
- Samoa
- Singapore
- Tonga

== Pool Stage ==
=== Group A ===
| Nation | Won | Drawn | Lost | For | Against |
|---|---|---|---|---|---|
| Kazakhstan | 2 | 0 | 0 | 53 | 0 |
| Tonga | 1 | 0 | 1 | 25 | 24 |
| Cook Islands | 0 | 0 | 2 | 0 | 54 |

| Kazakhstan | 29–0 | Cook Islands |

| Kazakhstan | 24–0 | Tonga |

| Tonga | 25–0 | Cook Islands |

=== Group B ===
| Nation | Won | Drawn | Lost | For | Against |
|---|---|---|---|---|---|
| Papua New Guinea | 3 | 0 | 0 | 74 | 10 |
| Samoa | 1 | 0 | 2 | 56 | 19 |
| Singapore | 1 | 0 | 2 | 14 | 39 |
| India | 1 | 0 | 2 | 10 | 86 |

| Singapore | 0–24 | Papua New Guinea |

| India | 0–41 | Samoa |

| Singapore | 7–5 | Samoa |

| India | 0–38 | Papua New Guinea |

| Singapore | 7–10 | India |

| Samoa | 10–12 | Papua New Guinea |

== Classification Stage ==
=== Cup Quarter finals ===
Quarter-finals
Kazakhstan | 50
India | 5
Cook Islands | 12
Samoa | 10
Papua New Guinea | 0
BYE | 0
Singapore | 12
Tonga | 5

Semi-finals
Kazakhstan | 19
Cook Islands | 0
Papua New Guinea | 55
Singapore | 0

Cup Final
Kazakhstan | 22
Papua New Guinea | 15
3rd Place
Cook Islands | 10
Singapore | 5

=== Plate semifinals ===
Semi-finals
Samoa | 12
India | 0
Tonga | 0
BYE | 0

Plate Final
Samoa | 14
Tonga | 7
7th Place
India | 0
BYE | 0
