= 2012 Oceania Women's Sevens Championship =

Second Oceania Women's Sevens tournament

- Host nation: Fiji
- Date: 3–4 August

Cup
- Champion: New Zealand
- Runner-up: Australia

Tournament details
- Matches played: 24

The 2012 Oceania Women's Sevens Championship was the second edition of the Oceania Women's Sevens Championship and also doubled as a qualifier for the 2013 Rugby World Cup Sevens. It was held from 3–4 August 2012 in Churchill Park, Lautoka, Fiji. Since Australia and New Zealand had already qualified for the World Cup. Fiji as the other highest placing team qualified for the Asia/Oceania final qualifier in Pune, India.

== Tournament ==
=== Pool Stages ===
Pool 1

Team	Won	Drawn	Lost	For	Against
Australia	3	0	0	113	7
Papua New Guinea	2	0	1	62	39
Samoa	1	0	2	46	51
Solomon Islands	0	0	3	24	87

Samoa	10 - 17	Papua New Guinea

Australia	50 - 0	Solomon Islands

Samoa	36 - 0	Solomon Islands

Australia	29 - 7	Papua New Guinea

Papua New Guinea	38 - 0	Solomon Islands

Australia	34 - 0	Samoa

Pool 2

Team	Won	Drawn	Lost	For	Against
New Zealand	3	0	0	100	7
Fiji	2	0	1	88	26
Tonga	1	0	2	15	99
Cook Islands	0	0	3	7	78

Fiji	36 - 7	Cook Islands

New Zealand	54 – 0	Tonga

Fiji	45 – 0	Tonga

New Zealand	27 – 0	Cook Islands

Cook Islands	0 - 15	Tonga

New Zealand	19 - 7	Fiji

=== Finals ===
Plate

Semi-finals
Samoa	17
Cook Islands	5
Tonga	40
Solomon Islands	5

Plate Final
Samoa	17
Tonga	12
7th Place
Cook Islands	41
Solomon Islands	0

Cup

Quarter-finals
Australia	22
Cook Islands	0
Papua New Guinea	24
Tonga	19
Fiji	15
Samoa	5
New Zealand	52
Solomon Islands	0

Semi-finals
Australia	26
Fiji	5
New Zealand	36
Papua New Guinea	0

Cup Final
New Zealand	35
Australia	24
3rd Place
Fiji	26
Papua New Guinea	14
