= 2014 Oceania Women's Sevens Championship =

Fourth Oceania Women's Sevens tournament

- Host nation: Australia
- Date: 3-4 October

Cup
- Champion: New Zealand
- Runner-up: Australia

Tournament details
- Matches played: 22

The 2014 Oceania Women's Sevens Championship was the fourth edition of the tournament. It was held from 3–4 October 2014 in Noosa, Australia. Samoa was ranked ahead of PNG due to winning their head-to-head match. There were no semifinals but the top two teams, New Zealand and Australia, played off in a final to decide the championship title.

== Tournament ==
Nation	Played	Won	Drawn	Lost	PF	PA	Diff
New Zealand	6	6	0	0	205	31	174
Australia	6	5	0	1	191	24	167
Fiji	6	4	0	2	181	48	133
Samoa	6	3	0	3	55	138	-83
Papua New Guinea	6	2	0	4	75	134	-59
Cook Islands	6	1	0	5	40	172	-132
Tonga	6	0	0	6	31	231	-200

Day 1

3 October

Fiji	38 - 0	Papua New Guinea

3 October

Australia	41 - 0	Tonga

3 October

New Zealand	41 - 0	Cook Islands

3 October

Samoa	24 - 12	Tonga

3 October

Australia	24 - 5	Fiji

3 October

Papua New Guinea	24 - 10	Cook Islands

3 October

Papua New Guinea	34 - 14	Tonga

3 October

Samoa	19 - 0	Cook Islands

3 October

New Zealand	24 - 7	Fiji

3 October

Tonga	5 - 30	Cook Islands

3 October

Samoa	12 - 10	Papua New Guinea

3 October

New Zealand	19 - 17	Australia

Day 2

4 October

Fiji	50 - 0	Tonga

4 October

Australia	33 - 0	Cook Islands

4 October

New Zealand	40 - 0	Samoa

4 October

Fiji	50 - 0	Cook Islands

4 October

Australia	45 - 0	Samoa

4 October

New Zealand	29 - 7	Papua New Guinea

4 October

Fiji	31 - 0	Samoa

4 October

Australia	31 - 0	Papua New Guinea

4 October

New Zealand	52 - 0	Tonga

Final

4 October

New Zealand	31 - 10	Australia
