= 2017 Oceania Women's Sevens Championship =

Seventh Oceania Women's Sevens tournament

- Host nation: Fiji
- Date: 10-11 November 2017

Cup
- Champion: (gold) New Zealand
- Runner-up: (silver) Australia
- Third: (bronze) Fiji

Tournament details
- Matches played: 20

The 2017 Oceania Women's Sevens Championship is the seventh Oceania Women's Sevens tournament. It will be held in Suva, Fiji on 10–11 November 2017. The tournament serves as a qualifier for the 2018 Rugby World Cup Sevens, with the highest-placed team aside from Australia, Fiji and New Zealand advancing.

== Teams ==
- Australia
- Cook Islands
- Fiji
- New Zealand
- Papua New Guinea
- Samoa
- Tahiti
- Tonga

== Pool stage ==
All times are Fiji Summer Time (UTC+13:00)

=== Pool A ===
Teams	Pld	W	D	L	PF	PA	+/−	Pts
New Zealand	3	3	0	0	111	5	+106	9
Papua New Guinea	3	1	1	1	89	27	+62	6
Cook Islands	3	1	1	1	88	38	+50	6
Tahiti	3	0	0	3	0	218	–218	3

10 November 2017
11:00

Papua New Guinea	12–12	Cook Islands

10 November 2017
11:20

New Zealand	70–0	Tahiti

10 November 2017
14:00

Papua New Guinea	77–0	Tahiti

10 November 2017
14:20

New Zealand	26–5	Cook Islands

10 November 2017
17:00

Cook Islands	71–0	Tahiti

10 November 2017
17:20

New Zealand	15–0	Papua New Guinea

=== Pool B ===
Teams	Pld	W	D	L	PF	PA	+/−	Pts
Australia	3	3	0	0	144	5	+139	9
Fiji	3	2	0	1	93	33	+60	7
Samoa	3	1	0	2	22	100	–78	5
Tonga	3	0	0	3	12	133	–121	3

10 November 2017
11:40

Fiji	36–0	Samoa

10 November 2017
12:00

Australia	59–0	Tonga

10 November 2017
14:40

Fiji	52–5	Tonga

10 November 2017
15:00

Australia	57–0	Samoa

10 November 2017
17:40

Samoa	22–7	Tonga

10 November 2017
18:00

Australia	28–5	Fiji

== Knockout stage ==
5th-8th Place

Semi-finals
11 November 2017 – 13:40
Samoa	59
Tahiti	0
11 November 2017 – 14:00
Cook Islands	29
Tonga	0

Fifth Place
11 November 2017 - 17:46
Samoa	N/A (Note: adverse weather conditions affected the schedule of the games)
Cook Islands
Seventh Place
11 November 2017 - 17:06
Tahiti	N/A
Tonga

Cup

Semi-finals
11 November 2017 – 13:00
Australia	25
Papua New Guinea	7
11 November 2017 – 13:20
New Zealand	24
Fiji	0

Final
11 November 2017 - 19:06
Australia	5
New Zealand	12
Third place
11 November 2017 - 18:26
Papua New Guinea	0
Fiji	39

- Note:

== Standings ==
Legend
Qualified to 2018 Rugby World Cup Sevens
Already qualified

Rank	Team
1st place, gold medalist(s)	New Zealand
2nd place, silver medalist(s)	Australia
3rd place, bronze medalist(s)	Fiji
4	Papua New Guinea
5	Cook Islands; Samoa
7	Tahiti; Tonga

== See also ==
- 2018 Rugby World Cup Sevens qualifying – Women
- 2017 Oceania Sevens Championship (men)
