= 2011 Asia Pacific Women's Sevens Championship =

2011 Asia Pacific Women’s Sevens Championship
- Host nation: Malaysia
- Date: 23–24 September 2011

Cup
- Champion: Papua New Guinea
- Runner-up: China
- Third: Samoa

Tournament details
- Matches played: 24

The 2011 Asia Pacific Women’s Sevens Championship was held at Kota Kinabalu, Malaysia from 23 to 24 September 2011. Papua New Guinea were crowned Champions after winning the Cup final at Likas Stadium, China were the runners-up.

== Teams ==
Eight teams took part in the tournament:

- China
- Cook Islands
- Hong Kong
- Malaysia
- Papua New Guinea
- Samoa
- Singapore
- Tonga

== Pool Stage ==
=== Group A ===
Nation	Won	Drawn	Lost	For	Against
Samoa	3	0	0	57	25
Hong Kong	2	0	1	62	27
Cook Islands	1	0	2	49	62
Singapore	0	0	3	20	74

Singapore	5–34	Cook Islands

Hong Kong	10–12	Samoa

Singapore	10–12	Samoa

Hong Kong	24–10	Cook Islands

Singapore	5–28	Hong Kong

Cook Islands	5–33	Samoa

=== Group B ===
Nation	Won	Drawn	Lost	For	Against
China	3	0	0	62	25
Papua New Guinea	2	0	1	62	22
Tonga	1	0	2	50	36
Malaysia	0	0	3	0	100

China	21–15	Tonga

Malaysia	0–46	Papua New Guinea

China	12–10	Papua New Guinea

Malaysia	0–25	Tonga

China	29–0	Malaysia

Tonga	10–17	Papua New Guinea

== Classification Stage ==
=== Cup Quarter finals ===
Quarter-finals
Samoa	46
Malaysia	0
Papua New Guinea	24
Cook Islands	5
Hong Kong	15
Tonga	0
China	29
Singapore	5

Semi-finals
Samoa	17
Papua New Guinea	22
Hong Kong	12
China	22

Cup Final
Papua New Guinea	24
China	10
3rd Place
Samoa	17
Hong Kong	5

=== Plate semifinals ===
Semi-finals
Malaysia	0
Cook Islands	34
Tonga	7
Singapore	12

Plate Final
Singapore	12
Cook Islands	10
7th Place
Tonga	42
Malaysia	0
