= 2013 Oceania Women's Sevens Championship =

Third Oceania Women's Sevens tournament

- Host nation: Australia
- Date: 5–6 October

Cup
- Champion: Australia
- Runner-up: Fiji
- Third: New Zealand

Tournament details
- Matches played: 14

The 2013 Oceania Women's Sevens Championship was the third edition of the Oceania Women's Sevens Championship. It was held from 5–6 October 2013 in Noosa, Australia. Australia were crowned Champions with Fiji as runner-up.

== Tournament ==
=== Group phase ===
Nation	Won	Drawn	Lost	For	Against
Australia	4	0	0	143	12
New Zealand	3	0	1	124	31
Fiji	2	0	2	97	62
Samoa	0	1	3	12	121
Papua New Guinea	0	1	3	7	157

New Zealand	48–0	Papua New Guinea

Australia	36–0	Fiji

Samoa	7–7	Papua New Guinea

Australia	19–7	New Zealand

Australia	48–0	Papua New Guinea

Fiji	31–0	Samoa

New Zealand	43–0	Samoa

Fiji	54–0	Papua New Guinea

Australia	40–5	Samoa

New Zealand	26–12	Fiji

=== Finals ===
Semi-finals
Australia	30
Samoa	0
Fiji	17
New Zealand	0

Cup Final
Australia	22
Fiji	10
3rd Place
New Zealand	47
Samoa	14
