= Rugby sevens at the Pacific Games =

Rugby sevens at the Pacific Games was played for the first time at the 1999 South Pacific Games with only the men's tournament. The women's tournament was contested for the first time at the 2011 Pacific Games. The champions for the inaugural rugby sevens tournament in 1999 were Fiji for the men and in 2011 were also Fiji for the women. Prior to 1999, 15-a-side matches were played between the 1963–1995 games.

In 2014, Australia and New Zealand were invited to participate in some events for the 2015 Pacific Games, and the Australian women's sevens team was subsequently confirmed as a competitor for the women's tournament in Port Moresby.

== Men's summaries ==
Year	Host	Final			Bronze medal match			Ref
Year	Host	Gold medal	Score	Silver medal	Bronze medal	Score	Fourth place	Ref
1999	(Guam); Santa Rita	Fiji	40–12	Papua New Guinea	Vanuatu	26–7	Solomon Islands
2003	(Fiji); Suva	Fiji	43–10	Cook Islands	Samoa	50–0	Tonga
2007	(Samoa); Apia	Fiji	26–19	Samoa	Papua New Guinea	31–5	Solomon Islands
2011	(New Caledonia); Noumea	Samoa	21–19	Fiji	Papua New Guinea	10–5	Niue
2015	(Papua New Guinea); Port Moresby	Fiji	33–7	Samoa	Tonga	19–12	Papua New Guinea
2019	(Samoa); Apia	Fiji	7–5	Samoa	Tonga	19–10	Cook Islands
2023	(Solomon Islands); Honiara	Fiji	19–5	Samoa	Tonga	19–7	Papua New Guinea
2027	(French Polynesia); Pirae		–			–

== Women's summaries ==
Women's rugby sevens was first contested in 2011 since the introduction of the 7-a-side format of rugby at the Pacific Games. Fiji have dominated the women's game having won every tournament to date.

Year	Host	Final			Bronze medal match			Ref
Year	Host	Gold medal	Score	Silver medal	Bronze medal	Score	Fourth place	Ref
2011	(New Caledonia); Noumea	Fiji	43–7	Samoa	Papua New Guinea	19–5	New Caledonia
2015	(Papua New Guinea); Port Moresby	Fiji	12–10	Australia	Papua New Guinea	15–0	New Caledonia
2019	(Samoa); Apia	Fiji	14–5	Australia	Papua New Guinea	28–12	Samoa
2023	(Solomon Islands); Honiara	Fiji	17–7	Papua New Guinea	Wallis and Futuna	17–7	Tonga
2027	(French Polynesia); Pirae		–			–

== Medal table ==
The all-time medal table for rugby sevens at the Pacific Games, including the South Pacific Games, from 1999–present is collated in the table below.

All-time medal table
Rank	Nation	Gold	Silver	Bronze	Total
1	Fiji	10	1	0	11
2	Samoa	1	5	1	7
3	Papua New Guinea	0	2	5	7
4	Australia	0	2	0	2
5	Cook Islands	0	1	0	1
6	Tonga	0	0	3	3
7	Vanuatu	0	0	1	1
7	Wallis and Futuna	0	0	1	1
Totals (8 entries)		11	11	11	33

== Pacific Mini Games ==
Men's tournament

Only men's rugby sevens have been contested at the Pacific Mini Games.

Year	Host	Final			Bronze medal match			Ref
Year	Host	Gold medal	Score	Silver medal	Bronze medal	Score	Fourth place	Ref
1997	(American Samoa); Pago Pago	Samoa	57–0	American Samoa	Solomon Islands	25–17	Niue
2009	(Cook Islands); Rarotonga	Samoa	36–12	Fiji	Tonga	38–12	Niue
2013	(Wallis and Futuna); Mata-Utu	Samoa	31–12	Fiji	Tonga	19–12	Papua New Guinea
2017	(Vanuatu); Port Vila	Samoa	14–7	Fiji	Tonga	24–19	Solomon Islands

=== Medal table ===
The all-time medal table for rugby sevens at the Pacific Mini Games, including the South Pacific Mini Games, from 1997–present is collated in the table below.

All-time medal table
Rank	Nation	Gold	Silver	Bronze	Total
1	Samoa	4	0	0	4
2	Fiji	0	3	0	3
3	American Samoa	0	1	0	1
4	Tonga	0	0	3	3
5	Solomon Islands	0	0	1	1
Totals (5 entries)		4	4	4	12

== See also ==
- Rugby union at the Pacific Games
- Rugby sevens at the Summer Olympics
- Rugby sevens at the Commonwealth Games
