= Tonga women's national rugby sevens team =

^{Tonga}
- Union: Tonga Rugby Football Union
- Coach: Eva Mafi
- Captain: Tokilupe Veamatahau
Team kit

World Cup Sevens
- Appearances: 0

The Tonga women's national rugby sevens team represents Tonga in rugby sevens.

== History ==
Tonga has played at the 2010 and 2011 Asia-Pacific Championship, the Oceania Women's Sevens Championship since 2012, and the 2015 Pacific Games.

They won the Bowl final at the 2011 Borneo Women's Sevens competition which included teams from Asia and the Oceanic region.

At the 2023 Oceania Women's Sevens Championship in Brisbane, they finished in sixth place with two wins and three losses. They also competed at the Pacific Games in Honiara where they had a surprise defeat to newcomers, Wallis and Futuna, in their bronze medal playoff.

== Squad ==
Squad to the 2023 Pacific Games:

Players
Mele Milate Akolo
Tupou Veiongo Lamipeti
Siutiti Vea Angalau He Lotu Ma'ake
Loketi Mahoni
Lesieli Rose Tai
Shonte Latisha Maryann Toa
Jazmon Meraina Mii Petisi Tupou-Witchman
Funda Uluheua
Neomai Tiulipe Ofongaki Vunga

== Tournament History ==
=== Pacific Games ===
Pacific Games
Year	Round	Position	Pld	W	D	L
(New Caledonia) 2011	Did Not Compete					
(Papua New Guinea) 2015	5th Place Playoff	6th	7	2	0	5
(Samoa) 2019	Did Not Compete					
(Solomon Islands) 2023	Bronze Final	4th	5	2	0	3
Total	0 Titles	2/4	12	4	0	8

=== Oceania Women's Sevens ===
Oceania Women's Sevens
Year	Round	Position	Pld	W	D	L
(Papua New Guinea) 2007	Did Not Compete					
(Samoa) 2008	Did Not Compete					
(Fiji) 2012	Plate Final	6th	6	2	0	4
(Australia) 2013	Did Not Compete					
(Australia) 2014	Round-robin	7th	6	0	0	6
(New Zealand) 2015	Pool Stage	5th	4	0	0	4
(Fiji) 2016	Round-robin	6th	6	1	0	5
(Fiji) 2017	5th–8th Place Playoff	7th	4	0	0	4
(Fiji) 2018	Did Not Compete					
(Fiji) 2019	11th Place Playoff	11th	4	1	0	3
(Australia) 2021	Did Not Compete					
(New Zealand) 2022	Did Not Compete					
(Australia) 2023	5th Place Playoff	6th	5	2	0	3
Total	0 Titles	7/13	35	6	0	29

=== Oceania Rugby Sevens Challenge ===
Year	Round	Position	Pld	W	D	L
(Australia) 2022	3rd Place Playoff	3rd	7	4	0	3
Total	0 Titles	1/1	7	4	0	3
