= Taïna Maka =

French international rugby union player

- Born: 22 December 2004 (age 21)
- Height: 177 cm (5 ft 10 in)
- Weight: 80 kg (176 lb; 12 st 8 lb)

Rugby union career
- Position: Loose Forward
Senior career
Years	Team	Apps	(Points)
2020–	FC Grenoble Amazones		(0)
International career
Years	Team	Apps	(Points)
2024–	France U-20		(0)
2024–	France	6	(0)
Medal record
Women's rugby sevens
Representing Wallis and Futuna
Pacific Games
Bronze medal – third place	2023 Honiara	Team competition

Taïna Maka (born 22 December 2004) is a French rugby union player. She competed for France at the 2025 Women's Rugby World Cup.

== Rugby career ==
Maka was born in Wallis and Futuna. She began playing for the Union Sportive Rhone XV team in 2017 before she joined the FC Grenoble Amazones in 2020.

In 2023, she competed for the Wallis and Futuna women's sevens team which won the bronze medal at the Pacific Games.

In 2024, she played for the French Under-20 team.

Maka was called up into the senior French side for the 2025 Women's Six Nations. She made her international debut against England in France's last game of the tournament.

She was selected in the French squad to the 2025 Women's Rugby World Cup on 2 August.

== Personal life ==
Alongside her sporting career, Maka has continued her nursing studies in 2025.
