= Rugby sevens at the 2019 Pacific Games =

- Venue: St Joseph's Sports Field
- Location: Apia, Samoa
- Dates: 12–13 July 2019

Rugby sevens at the 2019 Pacific Games in Samoa was played from 12 to 13 July at the St Joseph's Sports Field. The venue was changed three days before the tournament due to muddy conditions at Apia Park.

== Medal summary ==
=== Medal table ===
* Host nation (Samoa)

Rank	Nation	Gold	Silver	Bronze	Total
1	Fiji	2	0	0	2
2	Australia	0	1	0	1
2	Samoa*	0	1	0	1
4	Papua New Guinea	0	0	1	1
4	Tonga	0	0	1	1
Totals (5 entries)		2	2	2	6

=== Results ===
Event	Gold	Silver	Bronze
Men's tournament	Fiji; Menausi Qiodravu; Suliano Volivolituevei; Beniamino Vota; Fabiano Rogovakalali; Isoa Tabu; Asaeli Tuivuaka; Ratu Napolioni Bolaca; Terio Tamani; Rusiate Matai; Glendale Cakautini; Uliano Cokanauto; Luke Lutunavanua	Samoa; Siaosi Asofolau; Tofatuimoana Solia; Tila Mealoi; Joe Perez; Laaloi Leilua; Elisapeta Alofipo; Phillip Luki; Tomasi Logotuli; Alamanda Motuga; Johnny Samuelu; Paulo Fanuasa; Johnny Vaili	Tonga; Aisea Halo; Edward Sunia; Katilimoni Tuipulotu; Latuselu Vailea; Louis Ova; Niukula Osika; Onelani Pongi; Samisoni Asi; Sione Tupou; Tanekinanga Iloa; Viliami Fotofili; Winitana Fotofili
Women's tournament	Fiji; Priscilla Siata; Sereana Nagatalevu; Raijeli Daveua; Asinate Savu; Lavenia Tinai; Merewalesi Rokouono; Elenoa Naimata; Mereula Torooti; Luisa Tisolo; Akanisi Sokoiwasa; Ana Maria Naimasi; Tokasa Seniyasi	Australia; Lauren Brown; Rhiannon Byers; Kennedy Cherrington; Madison Ashby; Eva Karpani; Charlotte Kennington; Page McGregor; Yasmin Meakes; Hagiga Mosby; Faith Nathan; Cassie Staples; Jakiya Whitfeld	Papua New Guinea; Kymlie Rapilla; Lynette Kwarula; Marie Biyama; Fatima Rama; Taiva Lavai; Gemma Schnaubelt; Alice Alois; Yolanda Gittins; Helen Abau; Marlugu Dixon; Melanie Kawa; Gwen Pokana

== See also ==
- Rugby sevens at the Pacific Games
