= Solomon Islands women's national rugby sevens team =

Solomon Islands
- Union: Solomon Islands Rugby Union Federation
- Coach: Jim Seuika
- Captain: Jessica Sami
Team kit

World Cup Sevens
- Appearances: 0

The Solomon Islands women's national sevens team is Solomon Islands national representative in Rugby sevens. They participated in the 2012 Oceania Women's Sevens Championship in Fiji. At the 2019 Oceania Women's Sevens Championship in Fiji, they finished in sixth place.

They competed at the 2023 Oceania Women's Sevens and finished ninth.

== Current squad ==
Squad to the 2023 Pacific Games:

Players
Lorethar Laui
Madalyn Maefunu
Alice Noatonu
Stellin Otto
Hazilyn Una Sade
Jessica Vanessa Sami
Lovelyn Panio Sa'omatangi
Siasia Tangikapia Tepuke
Tanisha Kauimasi Tuiaki
Kayla Teata Tuiakihenua
Adi Unaisi Dimainalovo Vatutuku
Lanieta Chanel Williamson Vatutuku

== Tournament History ==
=== Pacific Games ===
Pacific Games
Year	Round	Position	Pld	W	D	L
(New Caledonia) 2011	Did Not Compete					
(Papua New Guinea) 2015	Did Not Compete					
(Samoa) 2019	7th Place Playoff	7th	6	1	0	5
(Solomon Islands) 2023	5th Place Playoff	5th	5	3	0	2
Total	0 Titles	2/4	11	4	0	7

=== Oceania Women's Sevens ===
Oceania Women's Sevens
Year	Round	Position	Pld	W	D	L
2007–08	Did Not Compete					
(Fiji) 2012	7th Place Playoff	8th	6	3	0	3
2013–15	Did Not Compete					
(Fiji) 2016	Round-robin	7th	6	0	0	6
2017–18	Did Not Compete					
(Fiji) 2019	5th Place Playoff	6th	5	1	0	4
2021–22	Did Not Compete					
(Australia) 2023	9th Place Playoff	9th	5	2	0	3
Total	0 Titles	4/13	22	6	0	16

=== Oceania Rugby Sevens Challenge ===
Year	Round	Position	Pld	W	D	L
(Australia) 2022	Fifth Place Playoff	6th	0	0	0	7
Total	0 Titles	1/1	0	0	0	7
