= American Samoa women's national rugby sevens team =

American Samoa
- Union: American Samoa Rugby Union
- Nickname: Segaula
- Coach: Tommy Elisara
- Captain: Chardelle Fayee Tuiavi
Team kit	Change kit	Change kit

World Cup Sevens
- Appearances: 0

The American Samoa women's national rugby sevens team represents American Samoa in women's rugby sevens.

== Background ==
American Samoa competed at the 2019 Pacific Games that was held in Samoa.

The Segaula made their Oceania Sevens debut at the 2023 tournament in Brisbane, Australia. It was a historic moment because it was their first international competition. They finished eighth overall after losing to the Cook Islands in the seventh place playoff.

== Players ==
Squad to the 2023 Pacific Games:

Players
Marlee Ana Garrison
Leonia Levale Lolesio
Manaia Maleka Moala
Sa’afia Saufua
Rhonda Semau
Punipuao Lealofi Skipps
Mary Juliette Takitaki
Precious Tavete
Precious Tuloto Toilolo
Chardelle Fayee Tuiavi'i
Tauilo Vaitogi Konelio
Iliui Williams

== Tournament History ==
=== Pacific Games ===
Pacific Games
Year	Round	Position	Pld	W	D	L
(New Caledonia) 2011	Did Not Compete					
(Papua New Guinea) 2015	Did Not Compete					
(Samoa) 2019	7th Place Playoff	8th	6	0	0	6
(Solomon Islands) 2023	5th Place Playoff	6th	5	2	0	3
Total	0 Titles	2/4	11	2	0	9

=== Oceania Sevens ===
Oceania Sevens Championship
Year	Round	Position	Pld	W	D	L
2008–2022	Did Not Compete					
(Australia) 2023	7th Place Playoff	8th	5	2	0	3
Total	0 Titles	1/2	5	2	0	3
