= New Caledonia women's national rugby sevens team =

New Caledonia
- Union: New Caledonia Rugby Committee
Team kit

Largest win
- New Caledonia 33 - 5 Tahiti (2011 Pacific Games, 31 August 2011)

World Cup Sevens
- Appearances: 0

The New Caledonia women's national rugby sevens team is New Caledonia's national representative in rugby sevens.

== Current squad ==
=== Previous squads ===
2015 Pacific Games squad

- Shirley Benemie
- Djesy Gaia
- Lydie Wamejo
- Manon Boudet
- Theresa Boulouguen
- Louise Waiane
- Vanessa Beaudouin
- Claire Hillaireau
- Yolaine Yengo
- Marie Hélène Wahnawe
- Anne-Marie Waitreu
- Marie Aymeric
2011 Pacific Games squad

- Djemila Ihmanang
- Anne-Marie Waitreu
- Elisabete Keletaona
- Claire Hillaireau
- Marie-Helene Wahnawe
- Catherine Devillers
- Brenda Siwoine
- Yolaine Yengo
- Bianca Nekotrotro
- Wendy Mayat
- Dorothee Pakaina
- Victoire Homou

== Tournament History ==
=== Pacific Games ===
Pacific Games
Year	Round	Position	Pld	W	D	L
(New Caledonia) 2011	Bronze Medal Final	4th	7	3	0	4
(Papua New Guinea) 2015	Bronze Medal Final	4th	7	2	1	4
(Samoa) 2019	5th Place Play-off	5th	6	3	0	3
(Solomon Islands) 2023	Did Not Compete					
Total	0 Titles	3/4	20	8	1	11

=== Oceania Women's Sevens ===
Oceania Women's Sevens
Year	Round	Position	Pld	W	D	L
2007–17	Did Not Compete					
(Fiji) 2018	7th Place Playoff	7th	5	1	0	4
2019–23	Did Not Compete					
Total	0 Titles	1/13	5	1	0	4

== See also ==
- Rugby union in New Caledonia
