= 2007 Pacific Women's Sevens Championship =

- Host nation: Papua New Guinea
- Date: 1–2 December

Cup
- Champion: Fiji
- Runner-up: Samoa

Tournament details
- Matches played: 8

The 2007 Pacific Women's Sevens Championship was played on 1 and 2 December at Port Moresby, Papua New Guinea. Fiji won the tournament and Samoa were runners-up.

== Teams ==
Only four teams competed at the tournament.

- Fiji
- Niue
- Papua New Guinea
- Samoa

== Tournament ==
Nation	Played	Won	Drawn	Lost	For	Against	Pts
Fiji	3	3	0	0	112	7	9
Samoa	3	1	1	1	53	43	6
Papua New Guinea	3	1	1	1	17	63	6
Niue	3	0	0	3	0	40	3

1 December

Fiji	40–0	Niue

1 December

Samoa	17–17	Papua New Guinea

1 December

Fiji	46–0	Papua New Guinea

1 December

Samoa	29–0	Niue

2 December

Fiji	26–7	Samoa

2 December

Niue	N/A	Papua New Guinea

Classification Stages

=== Plate Final ===
2 December

Papua New Guinea	38–0	Niue

=== Final ===
2 December

Fiji	31–5	Samoa
