= Rusila Nagasau =

Fijian rugby union player

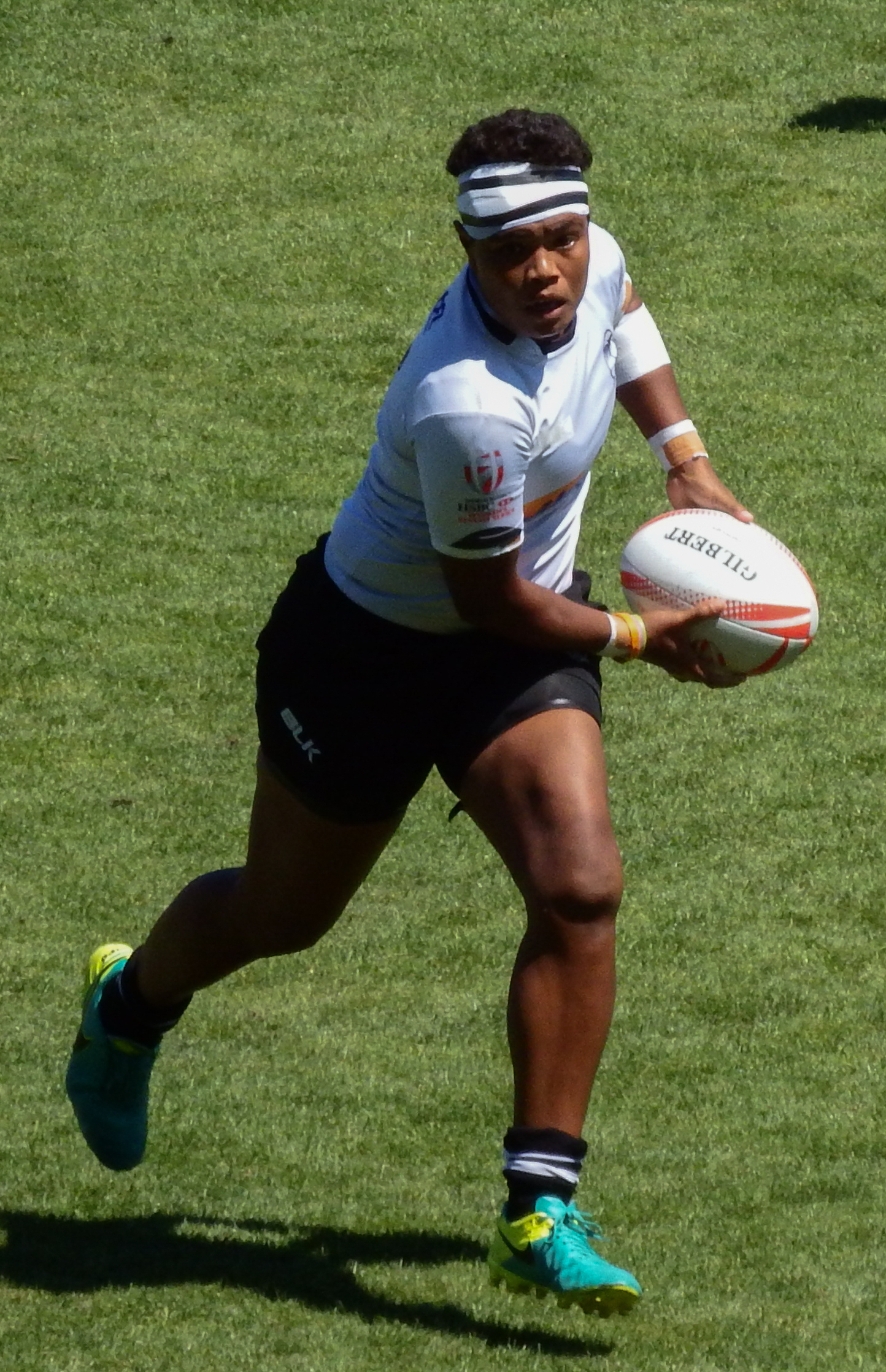
- Naqasau in 2017
- Born: 4 August 1987 (age 39)
- Height: 1.75 m (5 ft 9 in)
- Weight: 80 kg (176 lb)

Rugby union career
- Position: Loose forward
Super Rugby
Years	Team	Apps	(Points)
2025	Fijian Drua		(0)
International career
Years	Team	Apps	(Points)
	Fiji	12	(27)
National sevens team
Years	Team		Comps
2016	Fiji		
Medal record
Representing Fiji
Women's rugby sevens
Olympic Games
Bronze medal – third place	2020 Tokyo	Team competition
Commonwealth Games
Silver medal – second place	2022 Birmingham	Team competition

Rusila Nagasau (born 4 August 1987) is a Fijian rugby union player. She plays rugby sevens for Fiji and was also a representative soccer player. She was included in the squad for the 2016 France Women's Sevens.

== Rugby career ==
Nagasau was instrumental in Fiji qualifying for the 2016 Olympics when she scored four tries in the 2015 Oceania Women's Sevens Championship final against Samoa. She was named in the sevens squad for the 2016 Summer Olympics alongside cousin and captain Ana Maria Roqica.

Nagasau represented Fiji at the 2020 Summer Olympics. She won a bronze medal at the event.

Nagasau was a batonbearer for the 2022 Commonwealth Games Queen's Baton Relay when the baton came to her island in February 2022. She was later a part of the Fijiana sevens team that won the silver medal at the 2022 Commonwealth Games in Birmingham. In September she captained the team at the Rugby World Cup Sevens in Cape Town.

Nagasau was named on the bench in the warm up match against Canada ahead of the World Cup. She was selected for the Fijiana squad to the 2021 Rugby World Cup in New Zealand.

On 9 August 2025, she was named in the Fijiana side to the Women's Rugby World Cup in England.

Olympic Games
Preceded by Osea Kolinisau	Flagbearer for Fiji (with Jerry Tuwai); Tokyo 2020	Succeeded by Incumbent
