= 2008 Oceania Women's Sevens Championship =

First Oceania Women's Sevens tournament

- Host nation: Samoa
- Date: 25–26 July

Cup
- Champion: Australia
- Runner-up: New Zealand

Tournament details
- Matches played: 14

The 2008 Oceania Women's Sevens Championship was the inaugural tournament for the Oceania Women's Sevens Championship and was held in Samoa from 25 to 26 July. The tournament was a regional qualifier for the 2009 Rugby World Cup Sevens. Australia won the tournament and New Zealand were runners-up. They made history by qualifying for the first ever Rugby World Cup Sevens women's competition.

== Teams ==
Five teams competed at the tournament and were vying for a spot at the RWC Sevens.

- Australia
- New Zealand
- Fiji
- Samoa
- Niue

== Tournament ==
Nation	Won	Drawn	Lost	For	Against	+/−	Pts
Australia	4	0	0	141	12	+129	12
New Zealand	3	0	1	124	25	+99	10
Fiji	2	0	2	89	64	+25	8
Samoa	1	0	3	60	92	–32	6
Niue	0	0	4	0	221	–221	4

New Zealand	29 - 0	Samoa

Fiji	55 - 0	Niue

Australia	21 - 7	Fiji

Samoa	48 - 0	Niue

Niue	0 - 59	New Zealand

Samoa	0 - 46	Australia

Fiji	10 - 31	New Zealand

Australia	59 - 0	Niue

Australia	15 - 5	New Zealand

Samoa	12 - 17	Fiji

=== Finals ===
Semi-finals
Australia	29
Samoa	0
New Zealand	35
Fiji	10

Cup Final
Australia	22
New Zealand	15
3rd Place
Fiji	24
Samoa	7
