= Fatima Rama =

Papua New Guinean footballer

Personal information
- Date of birth: 28 January 1981 (age 45)
- Position: Forward

Senior career*
Years	Team	Apps	(Gls)
- PAG Port Moresby

International career^{‡}
2014	Papua New Guinea	1	(0)
Rugby union career
International career
Years	Team	Apps	(Points)
2018-23	Papua New Guinea		(5)
National sevens team
Years	Team		Comps
2019-23	PNG 7s		
- * Club domestic league appearances and goals ‡ National team caps and goals as of 29 October 2014

Fatima Rama (born 28 January 1981) is a Papua New Guinean football and rugby player. She played as a forward in football for the Papua New Guinea women's national football team. She has also represented PNG in rugby sevens and fifteens.

== Career ==
Rama was a senior women's national team representative in football (soccer) before she switched codes to become a rugby union player.

=== 2018 ===
Rama competed at the Oceania Rugby Women's Championship, she scored a try against Samoa in the tournament's opening match, however, her side lost 45–56.

=== 2019–21 ===
At the 2019 Sydney Women's Sevens, she scored a stunning try in the first half against the Black Ferns sevens despite her team's 38–5 loss. In April 2019, she was named in the sevens squad to compete at the Hong Kong Women's Sevens to qualify as a core team for the 2019–20 World Rugby Women's Sevens Series.

Rama represented Papua New Guinea in sevens at the 2019 Pacific Games in Apia, Samoa.

In 2021, due to her success in rugby union, the Satellite 7s executives decided to introduce the women's competition in hopes of finding more female players like her.

=== 2023 ===
Rama was the oldest player, at age 41, to take the field at the 2023 New Zealand Women's Sevens in January. She also competed at the 2023 World Rugby Sevens Challenger Series in April; she scored a try for PNG against Hong Kong in their ninth-place semi-final, her side lost 7–44.

Rama was named in PNG's fifteens squad for the 2023 Oceania Rugby Women's Championship in Gold Coast, Queensland. She started in the opening game of the tournament against Fiji, her side were scoreless in their 77–0 loss.
