= 2016 Oceania Women's Sevens Championship =

Sixth Oceania Women's Sevens tournament

- Host nation: Fiji
- Date: 11–12 November 2016

Cup
- Champion: Australia
- Runner-up: Fiji
- Third: Papua New Guinea

Tournament details
- Matches played: 21

The 2016 Oceania Women's Sevens Championship was the sixth Oceania Women's Sevens tournament. It was held in Suva, Fiji on 11–12 November 2016.

Australia won the tournament as they won all six pool games to record the team's third Oceania Women's Sevens title

== Teams ==
Participating nations for the 2016 tournament were:

- Australia
- Cook Islands
- Fiji
- Papua New Guinea
- Samoa
- Solomon Islands
- Tonga

== Pool stage ==
Team	Pld	W	D	L	PF	PA	PD	Pts
Australia	6	6	0	0	258	5	+253	18
Fiji	6	5	0	1	229	36	+193	16
Papua New Guinea	6	4	0	2	116	106	+10	14
Cook Islands	6	3	0	3	122	100	+22	12
Samoa	6	2	0	4	70	142	–72	10
Tonga	6	1	0	5	33	155	–122	8
Solomon Islands	6	0	0	6	0	284	–284	6

11 November 2015
10:00

Fiji	52–0	Papua New Guinea

ANZ National Stadium, Suva

11 November 2015
10:21

Samoa	0–33	Cook Islands

ANZ National Stadium, Suva

11 November 2015
10:42

Australia	54–0	Solomon Islands

ANZ National Stadium, Suva

11 November 2015
12:27

Papua New Guinea	12–5	Cook Islands

ANZ National Stadium, Suva

11 November 2015
12:48

Tonga	21–0	Solomon Islands

ANZ National Stadium, Suva

11 November 2015
13:09

Fiji	28–5	Samoa

ANZ National Stadium, Suva

11 November 2015
14:54

Australia	45–5	Tonga

ANZ National Stadium, Suva

11 November 2015
15:15

Cook Islands	57–0	Solomon Islands

ANZ National Stadium, Suva

11 November 2015
15:36

Samoa	10–28	Papua New Guinea

ANZ National Stadium, Suva

11 November 2015
17:21

Fiji	38–0	Tonga

ANZ National Stadium, Suva

11 November 2015
17:42

Australia	43–0	Cook Islands

ANZ National Stadium, Suva

11 November 2015
18:03

Papua New Guinea	45–0	Solomon Islands

ANZ National Stadium, Suva

12 November 2015
12:24

Papua New Guinea	31–0	Tonga

ANZ National Stadium, Suva

12 November 2015
12:45

Australia	46–0	Samoa

ANZ National Stadium, Suva

12 November 2015
13:06

Fiji	66–0	Solomon Islands

ANZ National Stadium, Suva

12 November 2015
15:16

Samoa	14–7	Tonga

ANZ National Stadium, Suva

12 November 2015
15:37

Fiji	45–0	Cook Islands

ANZ National Stadium, Suva

12 November 2015
15:58

Australia	39–0	Papua New Guinea

ANZ National Stadium, Suva

12 November 2015
17:22

Cook Islands	27–0	Tonga

ANZ National Stadium, Suva

12 November 2015
17:43

Samoa	41–0	Solomon Islands

ANZ National Stadium, Suva

12 November 2015
18:40

Fiji	0–31	Australia

ANZ National Stadium, Suva

== Final standings ==
Legend
Winner

Rank	Team
1st place, gold medalist(s)	Australia
2nd place, silver medalist(s)	Fiji
3rd place, bronze medalist(s)	Papua New Guinea
4	Cook Islands
5	Samoa
6	Tonga
7	Solomon Islands

== See also ==
- Oceania Women's Sevens Championship
