= 2018 Rugby World Cup Sevens =

Rugby world championship

Tournament details
- Host nation: United States
- Venue: AT&T Park, San Francisco
- Dates: July 20 – July 22
- No. of nations: 24 (men); 16 (women)

Final positions
- Champions: New Zealand (men); New Zealand (women)

The 2018 Rugby World Cup Sevens was the seventh edition of the Rugby World Cup Sevens. Organized by World Rugby, it was held at AT&T Park, now known as Oracle Park, in San Francisco, United States. A total of 84 matches were played over three days from July 20–22, 2018. The men's tournament had 24 teams and the women's tournament 16, with both tournaments being played for the first time in a knock-out only format. New Zealand won the championship for both events — defeating England in the men's final and France in the women's final.

== Bidding ==
The bidding timeline for hosting the tournament was as follows:

1. February 28, 2014 —Interested countries declare their "intent to tender"
2. August 29, 2014 — World Rugby (then the IRB) distributes the tender documentation
3. December 5, 2014 — Countries submit their bids to World Rugby
4. May 13, 2015 — World Rugby Council chooses the host country

The following 14 countries declared their interest in bidding to host the event:

- England
- Fiji
- France
- Hong Kong
- Netherlands
- New Zealand
- Portugal
- Scotland
- Singapore
- South Africa
- Spain
- United Arab Emirates
- United States

== Venue ==
USA Rugby selected the San Francisco Bay Area as the host candidate. The venue was AT&T Park, home to the San Francisco Giants of Major League Baseball.

When the event was awarded to the Bay Area in May 2015, Avaya Stadium, home to the San Jose Earthquakes of Major League Soccer, was announced as a second venue. However, the following year, Avaya Stadium was dropped as a venue.

San Francisco	Location of 2018 Rugby World Cup Sevens
AT&T Park	Location of 2018 Rugby World Cup Sevens
Capacity: 42,000	Location of 2018 Rugby World Cup Sevens

== Popularity ==
The three-day tournament was the most-watched live rugby cast in the U.S. on record. In the U.S. Day 2 coverage achieved a rating of 1.0, while Day 3 coverage attained a 1.1. Coverage reached nine million viewers across NBC five telecasts, with finals day coverage averaging 1.365 million viewers. Over 100,000 fans attended the three day event, which was a record-breaking crowd for a rugby event in the United States.

== Schedule ==
Over the three days of competition there was a total of 84 matches played across both the men's and women's competitions.

All times in Pacific Daylight Time (UTC−07:00).

Date	Time	Stage	Matches
July 20, 2018 (Friday)	10:00–12:56	Women's Championship Cup Round of 16	8
July 20, 2018 (Friday)	13:01-15:57	Men's Championship Cup Pre-round of 16	8
July 20, 2018 (Friday)	16:02-18:58	Women's Challenge Quarterfinals; Women's Championship Cup Quarterfinals	8
July 20, 2018 (Friday)	19:03-21:59	Men's Championship Cup Round of 16	8
July 21, 2018 (Saturday)	09:30–13:57	Women's Challenge Semifinals; Women's Championship Cup Semifinals; Men's Bowl Quarterfinals	12
July 21, 2018 (Saturday)	14:04-17:00	Men's Challenge Quarterfinals; Men's Championship Cup Quarterfinals	8
July 21, 2018 (Saturday)	17:10-20:29	Women's 11th-16th Place Matches; Women's Challenge Final; Women's 5th-8th Place Matches; Women's Bronze Medal match Women's Championship Cup Final; Women's Ceremony	8
July 22, 2018 (Sunday)	09:00-14:52	Men's Bowl Semifinals; Men's Challenge Semifinals; Men's Championship Cup Semifinals; Men's 19th-24th Place Matches; Men's Bowl Final	16
July 22, 2018 (Sunday)	15:02-16:30	Men's 11th-16th Place Matches; Men's Challenge Final	4
July 22, 2018 (Sunday)	16:40-18:31	Men's 5th-8th Place Matches; Men's Bronze Medal Match; Men's Championship Cup Final; Men's Ceremony	4

== Qualifying – Men ==
Twenty four teams participate in the men's World Cup Sevens. Nine teams automatically qualify — eight by reaching the quarterfinals at the 2013 Rugby World Cup Sevens, and one host nation. Additionally, the top four teams not already qualified from the 2016–17 World Sevens Series also qualify. The remaining 11 teams qualify through continental qualifiers — two from each of the six regions, except North America which gets only one additional place.

Qualifying	Africa	North America	South America	Asia	Europe	Oceania
Automatic; Qualifiers	Kenya; South Africa	United States (Hosts)	—	—	England; France; Wales	Australia; Fiji; New Zealand (Holders)
2016–17 World; Series	—	Canada	Argentina	—	Scotland	Samoa
Continental; Qualifiers	Uganda; Zimbabwe	Jamaica	Uruguay; Chile	Hong Kong; Japan	Ireland; Russia	Papua New Guinea; Tonga
Total; Places (24)	4	3	3	2	6	6

== Qualifying – Women ==
Sixteen teams play at the women's World Cup Sevens. Four teams automatically qualified by reaching the semifinals at the 2013 Rugby World Cup Sevens. Additionally, the top four teams not already qualified from the 2016–17 Women's World Sevens Series also qualified. The remaining eight places will be filled via continental qualifiers.

	Africa	North America	South America	Asia	Europe	Oceania
Automatic; Qualifiers	—	United States (Hosts); Canada	—	—	Spain	New Zealand (Holders)
2016–17 World; Series	—	—	—	—	France; Russia	Australia; Fiji
Continental; Qualifiers	South Africa	Mexico	Brazil	China; Japan	England; Ireland	Papua New Guinea
Total; Places (16)	1	3	1	2	5	4

== Tournament – Men ==
Event	Winners	Score	Finalists	Semifinalists
Melrose Cup	New Zealand	33–12	England	South Africa (3); Fiji
5th Place	Argentina	33–7	United States	Scotland (7); France
Challenge Trophy	Ireland	24–14	Australia	Wales (11); Canada
13th Place	Samoa	22–17	Russia	Japan (15); Kenya
Bowl	Chile	20–7	Hong Kong	Uganda (19); Uruguay
21st Place	Papua New Guinea	31–14	Tonga	Zimbabwe (23); Jamaica

== Tournament – Women ==
Event	Winners	Score	Finalists	Semifinalists
World Cup	New Zealand	29–0	France	Australia (3); United States
5th Place	Spain	12–7	Ireland	Canada (7); Russia
Challenge Trophy	England	31–5	Japan	Fiji (11); China
13th Place	Brazil	22–0	South Africa	Papua New Guinea (15); Mexico

== See also ==
- Sports in the San Francisco Bay Area
- Rugby union in the United States
