= Timaima Tamoi =

Fijian rugby sevens player

Tima Tamoi
- Full name: Timaima Tamoi
- Born: 30 November 1987 (age 38)
- Height: 1.75 m (5 ft 9 in)
- Weight: 70 kg (150 lb; 11 st 0 lb)

Rugby union career
National sevens team
Years	Team	Comps
- Fiji

Timaima Tamoi (born 30 November 1987) is a Fijian rugby sevens player. She was a member of the Fiji women's national rugby sevens team at the 2016 Summer Olympics. She was part of the team that featured at the 2015 Canada Women's Sevens.
