= 2015 Oceania Women's Sevens Championship =

Fifth Oceania Women's Sevens tournament

- Host nation: New Zealand
- Date: 14–15 November 2015

Cup
- Champion: Fiji
- Runner-up: Samoa
- Third: Cook Islands

Tournament details
- Matches played: 14

The 2015 Oceania Women's Sevens Championship was the fifth Oceania Women's Sevens tournament. It was held in Auckland, New Zealand on 14–15 November 2015. As well as determining the regional championship, the tournament was also a qualifying event for the 2016 Olympics sevens, with the highest-placed eligible team not already qualified gaining a direct berth to Rio de Janeiro.

Fiji won the tournament, defeating Samoa 55–0 in the final. The second and third place getters Samoa and the Cook Islands received invitations to the final qualification tournament. Australia and New Zealand did not participate in the 2015 Oceania Women's Sevens as they had already qualified for the 2016 Olympics.

== Teams ==
Participating nations for the 2015 tournament are:

- Cook Islands
- Fiji
- Papua New Guinea
- Samoa
- Tonga

== Pool stage ==
Key to colours in group tables
Teams that advanced to the Cup semifinals

Team	Pld	W	D	L	PF	PA	PD	Pts
Fiji	4	4	0	0	194	0	+194	12
Cook Islands	4	3	0	1	75	67	+8	10
Samoa	4	2	0	2	73	67	+6	8
Papua New Guinea	4	1	0	3	34	108	–74	6
Tonga	4	0	0	4	10	144	–134	4

14 November 2015
10:00

Samoa	35–0	Tonga

The Trusts Arena, Henderson, New Zealand

14 November 2015
10:22

Papua New Guinea	7–29	Cook Islands

The Trusts Arena, Henderson, New Zealand

14 November 2015
12:36

Papua New Guinea	20–5	Tonga

The Trusts Arena, Henderson, New Zealand

14 November 2015
12:58

Fiji	48–0	Cook Islands

The Trusts Arena, Henderson, New Zealand

14 November 2015
15:12

Samoa	31–7	Papua New Guinea

The Trusts Arena, Henderson, New Zealand

14 November 2015
15:34

Fiji	62–0	Tonga

The Trusts Arena, Henderson, New Zealand

14 November 2015
17:48

Cook Islands	27–5	Tonga

The Trusts Arena, Henderson, New Zealand

14 November 2015
18:10

Fiji	41–0	Samoa

The Trusts Arena, Henderson, New Zealand

15 November 2015
10:00

Samoa	7–19	Cook Islands

The Trusts Arena, Henderson, New Zealand

15 November 2015
10:22

Fiji	43–0	Papua New Guinea

The Trusts Arena, Henderson, New Zealand

== Knockout stage ==
Semi-finals
15 November 2015 - 13:20 - The Trusts Arena, West Auckland
Fiji	38
Papua New Guinea	0
15 November 2015 - 12:58 - The Trusts Arena, West Auckland
Cook Islands	15
Samoa	17

Final
15 November 2015 - 17:32 - The Trusts Arena, West Auckland
Fiji	55
Samoa	0
Third place
15 November 2015 - 16:48 - The Trusts Arena, West Auckland
Papua New Guinea	0
Cook Islands	32

== Final standings ==
Legend
Winner of qualification position for the 2016 Summer Olympics.
Winner of qualification position for the Final Olympic Qualification Tournament.

Rank	Team
1st place, gold medalist(s)	Fiji
2nd place, silver medalist(s)	Samoa
3rd place, bronze medalist(s)	Cook Islands
4	Papua New Guinea
5	Tonga

== See also ==
- Oceania Women's Sevens Championship
