= 2023 Oceania Women's Sevens Championship =

Rugby tournament

- Host nation: Australia
- Date: 10–12 November 2023

Cup
- Champion: Australia
- Runner-up: Fiji
- Third: New Zealand

Tournament details
- Matches played: 27

The 2023 Oceania Women's Sevens Championship was the twelfth Oceania Women's Sevens Championship tournament for Oceania women's teams. It also served as the regional qualifier for the 2024 Paris Olympic Sevens and was held at Ballymore Stadium in Brisbane, Australia from 10 to 12 November.

== Teams ==
Ten national teams were scheduled to compete at the 2023 tournament.

- American Samoa
- Australia
- Cook Islands
- Fiji
- Nauru
- New Zealand
- Papua New Guinea
- Samoa
- Solomon Islands
- Tonga

== Format ==
With Australia and New Zealand already having qualified for the 2024 Summer Olympics, both were placed in Pool A where they played each other four times before the knockout stage. The remaining eight teams were seeded into Pool B and Pool C to allow a clear run for countries competing for Olympic qualification.

A knockout competition involving the two top teams of Pool B and two top teams of Pool C decided the Olympic qualifying berth.

== Pool stage ==
=== Pool A (Championship) ===
Pos	Team	P	W	D	L	PF	PA	PD	Pts	Qualification
1	Australia	4	3	1	0	108	64	+44	11	Advance to title playoffs
2	New Zealand	4	0	1	3	64	108	–44	5	Advance to title playoffs

10 November
15:40

New Zealand	19–21	Australia

Ballymore Stadium, Brisbane

10 November
19:20

New Zealand	21–21	Australia

Ballymore Stadium, Brisbane

11 November
16:08

New Zealand	12–26	Australia

Ballymore Stadium, Brisbane

11 November
19:04

New Zealand	12–40	Australia

Ballymore Stadium, Brisbane

=== Pool B (Olympic) ===
Pos	Team	P	W	D	L	PF	PA	PD	Pts	Qualification
1	Fiji	3	3	0	0	158	5	+153	9	Advance to title playoffs
2	Tonga	3	2	0	1	47	40	+7	7	Advance to title playoffs
3	American Samoa	3	1	0	2	28	121	–93	5	Advance to lower classification
4	Cook Islands	3	0	0	3	21	88	–67	3	Advance to lower classification

10 November
12:44

Tonga	32–0	American Samoa

Ballymore Stadium, Brisbane

10 November
13:06

Fiji	50–0	Cook Islands

Ballymore Stadium, Brisbane

10 November
16:46

Cook Islands	21–28	American Samoa

Ballymore Stadium, Brisbane

10 November
17:08

Fiji	40–5	Tonga

Ballymore Stadium, Brisbane

11 November
13:56

Tonga	10–0	Cook Islands

Ballymore Stadium, Brisbane

11 November
14:18

Fiji	68–0	American Samoa

Ballymore Stadium, Brisbane

=== Pool C (Olympic) ===
Pos	Team	P	W	D	L	PF	PA	PD	Pts	Qualification
1	Papua New Guinea	3	3	0	0	127	7	+120	9	Advance to title playoffs
2	Samoa	3	2	0	1	91	36	+55	7	Advance to title playoffs
3	Solomon Islands	3	1	0	2	41	75	–34	5	Advance to lower classification
4	Nauru	3	0	0	3	0	141	–141	3	Advance to lower classification

10 November
12:00

Samoa	50–0	Nauru

Ballymore Stadium, Brisbane

10 November
12:22

Papua New Guinea	41–0	Solomon Islands

Ballymore Stadium, Brisbane

10 November
16:02

Solomon Islands	41–0	Nauru

Ballymore Stadium, Brisbane

10 November
16:24

Papua New Guinea	36–7	Samoa

Ballymore Stadium, Brisbane

11 November
11:00

Samoa	34–0	Solomon Islands

Ballymore Stadium, Brisbane

11 November
11:22

Papua New Guinea	50–0	Nauru

Ballymore Stadium, Brisbane

== Knockout stage ==
=== Lower classification ===
7th–10th playoffs
12 November 2023 – 12:00 – Ballymore Stadium
American Samoa	27
Nauru	7
12 November 2023 – 12:22 – Ballymore Stadium
Solomon Islands	14
Cook Islands	19

Seventh place
12 November 2023 – 18:02 – Ballymore Stadium
American Samoa	7
Cook Islands	19
Ninth place
12 November 2023 – 17:40 – Ballymore Stadium
Nauru	0
Solomon Islands	31

=== Title playoffs ===
Olympic qualifier semi-finals
12 November 2023 – 12:44 – Ballymore Stadium
Fiji	42
Samoa	0
12 November 2023 – 13:06 – Ballymore Stadium
Papua New Guinea	21
Tonga	10

Championship playoff
12 November 2023 – 16:02 – Ballymore Stadium
Australia	14
New Zealand	10
12 November 2023 – 16:24 – Ballymore Stadium
Fiji	54
Papua New Guinea	0

Championship final
12 November 2023 – 19:30 – Ballymore Stadium
Australia	26
Fiji	0
Third place
12 November 2023 – 18:46 – Ballymore Stadium
New Zealand	20
Papua New Guinea	0

12 November 2023 – 18:24 – Ballymore Stadium
Samoa	22
Tonga	5

== Ranking ==
Place	Team	Qualification
1st place, gold medalist(s)	Australia	Already qualified for 2024 Olympics
2nd place, silver medalist(s)	Fiji	Qualified for 2024 Olympics
3rd place, bronze medalist(s)	New Zealand	Already qualified for 2024 Olympics
4	Papua New Guinea	Qualified for Olympic Repechage
5	Samoa	Qualified for Olympic Repechage
6	Tonga	
7	Cook Islands	
8	American Samoa	
9	Solomon Islands	
10	Nauru	

== See also ==
- 2023 Oceania Sevens Championship for men.
