= 2019 Oceania Women's Sevens Championship =

Ninth Oceania Women's Sevens tournament

- Host nation: Fiji
- Date: 7–9 November

Cup
- Champion: Australia (5th title)
- Runner-up: Fiji
- Third: New Zealand

Tournament details
- Matches played: 30

The 2019 Oceania Women's Sevens Championship was the ninth Oceania Women's Sevens tournament. It served as the regional qualifier for the 2020 Tokyo Olympic Sevens and was held at ANZ Stadium in Suva, Fiji on 7–9 November.

Australia won the tournament to claim their fifth Oceania Championship, defeating Fiji by 24–12 in the final. Runners-up Fiji, as the highest-placed side not already qualified, won the Oceania berth at the 2020 Olympic Sevens in Tokyo.

Papua New Guinea and Samoa finished fourth and fifth respectively and, as the second and third highest-placed sides not already qualified, won entry to the 2020 Final Olympic Qualifier as well as the 2020 Hong Kong Women's Sevens qualifying tournament for the 2020–21 World Women's Sevens Series.

== Teams ==
The following nations competed at the 2019 tournament, including two invited teams – the Canadian development team (Maple Leafs) and a development side from Japan:

- Australia
- Canada
- Cook Islands
- Fiji
- Japan SDS
- Nauru
- New Zealand
- Papua New Guinea
- Samoa
- Solomon Islands
- Tonga
- Vanuatu

== Format ==
Teams were seeded into three pools of four.

To allow a clear run for countries competing for qualification to the 2020 Olympic Sevens, the two Oceania nations already qualified, Australia and New Zealand, were placed in Pool A together with the invited development sides (not eligible for Oceania berths) from Canada and Japan. The remaining teams were seeded into Pool B and Pool C.

A knockout competition involving the two top teams of Pool B and two top teams of Pool C decided the Olympic qualifying berth.

== Pool stage ==
=== Pool A (International) ===
Pos	Team	P	W	D	L	PF	PA	PD	Pts	Qualification
1	Australia	3	3	0	0	64	20	+44	9	Advance to title playoffs
2	New Zealand	3	2	0	1	50	34	+16	7	Advance to title playoffs
3	Japan	3	1	0	2	27	59	–32	5	
4	Canada	3	0	0	3	22	50	–28	3	

7 November
13:56

Canada	5–19	Australia

ANZ Stadium, Suva

7 November
14:18

New Zealand	26–5	Japan

ANZ Stadium, Suva

8 November
11:44

Canada	5–12	Japan

ANZ Stadium, Suva

8 November
12:06

New Zealand	5–17	Australia

ANZ Stadium, Suva

8 November
16:08

Australia	28–10	Japan

ANZ Stadium, Suva

8 November
16:30

New Zealand	19–12	Canada

ANZ Stadium, Suva

=== Pool B (Olympic) ===
Pos	Team	P	W	D	L	PF	PA	PD	Pts	Qualification
1	Fiji	3	3	0	0	189	0	+189	9	Advance to title playoffs
2	Solomon Islands	3	1	0	2	41	97	–56	5	Advance to title playoffs
3	Vanuatu	3	1	0	2	29	85	–56	5	
4	Nauru	3	1	0	2	27	104	–77	5	

7 November
16:52

Nauru	17–14	Solomon Islands

ANZ Stadium, Suva

7 November
17:14

Fiji	48–0	Vanuatu

ANZ Stadium, Suva

8 November
12:28

Nauru	10–24	Vanuatu

ANZ Stadium, Suva

8 November
12:50

Fiji	75–0	Solomon Islands

ANZ Stadium, Suva

8 November
16:52

Solomon Islands	27–5	Vanuatu

ANZ Stadium, Suva

8 November
17:14

Fiji	66–0	Nauru

ANZ Stadium, Suva

=== Pool C (Olympic) ===
Pos	Team	P	W	D	L	PF	PA	PD	Pts	Qualification
1	Papua New Guinea	3	3	0	0	88	22	+66	9	Advance to title playoffs
2	Samoa	3	2	0	1	74	36	+38	7	Advance to title playoffs
3	Cook Islands	3	1	0	2	56	45	+11	5	
4	Tonga	3	0	0	3	5	120	–115	3	

7 November
11:00

Samoa	21–19	Cook Islands

ANZ Stadium, Suva

7 November
11:22

Papua New Guinea	52–0	Tonga

ANZ Stadium, Suva

8 November
11:00

Samoa	43–0	Tonga

ANZ Stadium, Suva

8 November
11:22

Papua New Guinea	19–12	Cook Islands

ANZ Stadium, Suva

8 November
15:24

Cook Islands	25–5	Tonga

ANZ Stadium, Suva

8 November
15:46

Papua New Guinea	17–10	Samoa

ANZ Stadium, Suva

== Knockout stage ==
=== Lower classification ===
7th–10th playoffs
9 November 2019 – 10.00 – ANZ Stadium
Cook Islands	0
Canada	33
9 November 2019 – 10.22 – ANZ Stadium
Japan	39
Vanuatu	0

Seventh place
9 November 2019 – 15.08 – ANZ Stadium
Canada	10
Japan	5
Ninth place
9 November 2019 – 14.56 – ANZ Stadium
Cook Islands	34
Vanuatu	0

Eleventh place

9 November 2019 – 12.56 – ANZ Stadium
Nauru	12
Tonga	19

=== Title playoffs ===
Olympic qualifier semifinals
9 November 2019 – 12.12 – ANZ Stadium
B1 Fiji	43
C2 Samoa	0
9 November 2019 – 12.34 – ANZ Stadium
C1 Papua New Guinea	31
B2 Solomon Islands	7

International playoff
9 November 2019 – 15.30 – ANZ Stadium
A1 Australia	12
A2 New Zealand	0
9 November 2019 – 15.52 – ANZ Stadium
Fiji	36
Papua New Guinea	0

Oceania final
9 November 2019 – 19.50 – ANZ Stadium
Australia	24
Fiji	12
Third place
9 November 2019 – 18.35 – ANZ Stadium
New Zealand	29
Papua New Guinea	0

9 November 2019 – 16.58 – ANZ Stadium
Samoa	45
Solomon Islands	0

== Placings ==
Place	Team	Qualification
1st place, gold medalist(s)	Australia	
2nd place, silver medalist(s)	Fiji	Direct qualification to the Olympic Sevens for 2020
3rd place, bronze medalist(s)	New Zealand	
4	Papua New Guinea	Entry to Olympic qualifier and World Challenger Series for 2020
5	Samoa	Entry to Olympic qualifier for 2020
6	Solomon Islands	
7	Canada	
8	Japan	
9	Cook Islands	
10	Vanuatu	
11	Tonga	
12	Nauru	

Legend
Light bar	Already a core team in World Series and previously qualified to the Olympic Sevens for 2020
Dark bar	Already a core team in World Series for 2020
Dotted bar	Invited team not eligible for qualification from Oceania

== See also ==
- 2019 Oceania Sevens Championship (for men)
