= 2022 Oceania Women's Sevens Championship =

Eleventh Oceania Women's Sevens tournament

- Host nation: New Zealand
- Date: 24–26 June 2022

Cup
- Champion: Black Ferns Ma
- Runner-up: Australia VII Selection

Tournament details
- Matches played: 12

The 2022 Oceania Women's Sevens Championship was held in Pukekohe, New Zealand on 24–26 June. It was the eleventh edition of the Oceania Championship in women's rugby sevens.

The competition served as one of the final events for Oceania Rugby national teams ahead of the Commonwealth Games in July and the Sevens World Cup in September. It was played as a double round-robin format at Navigation Homes Stadium.

Black Ferns Ma won the tournament, with Australia VII Selection as runner-up.

== Teams ==
Four women's teams competed at the 2022 tournament:

- Black Ferns Ma
- Black Ferns Pango
- Australia Selection
- Fijiana

== Championship ==
=== Standings ===
Pos	Team	P	W	D	L	PF	PA	PD	Pts
1	Black Ferns Ma	6	6	0	0	135	60	75	
2	Australia Selection	6	4	0	2	117	91	26	
3	Fijiana	6	1	0	5	84	119	–35	
4	Black Ferns Pango	6	1	0	5	70	136	–66	

=== Round 1 ===
24 June
11:48 NZST

Australia Selection	21–12	Black Ferns Pango

Navigation Homes Stadium, Pukekohe

24 June
12:12 NZST

Fijiana	12–26	Black Ferns Ma

Navigation Homes Stadium, Pukekohe

=== Round 2 ===
24 June
17:48 NZST

Black Ferns Pango	14–28	Black Ferns Ma

Navigation Homes Stadium, Pukekohe

24 June
18:12 NZST

Australia Selection	19–17	Fijiana

Navigation Homes Stadium, Pukekohe

=== Round 3 ===
25 June
11:48 NZST

Fijiana	14–19	Black Ferns Pango

Navigation Homes Stadium, Pukekohe

25 June
12:12 NZST

Australia Selection	12–17	Black Ferns Ma

Navigation Homes Stadium, Pukekohe

=== Round 4 ===
25 June
17:48 NZST

Australia Selection	29–5	Black Ferns Pango

Navigation Homes Stadium, Pukekohe

25 June
18:12 NZST

Fijiana	7–14	Black Ferns Ma

Navigation Homes Stadium, Pukekohe

=== Round 5 ===
26 June
11:48 NZST

Black Ferns Ma	24–10	Black Ferns Pango

Navigation Homes Stadium, Pukekohe

26 June
12:12 NZST

Australia Selection	31–14	Fijiana

Navigation Homes Stadium, Pukekohe

=== Round 6 ===
26 June
18:00 NZST

Fijiana	20–10	Black Ferns Pango

Navigation Homes Stadium, Pukekohe

26 June
18:24 NZST

Australia Selection	5–26	Black Ferns Ma

Navigation Homes Stadium, Pukekohe

=== Placings ===
Place	Team
1st place, gold medalist(s)	Black Ferns Ma
2nd place, silver medalist(s)	Australia Selection
3rd place, bronze medalist(s)	Fijiana
4	Black Ferns Pango

== Challenge ==
Papua New Guinea finished first in the women's tournament of the Oceania Rugby Sevens Challenge to qualify for the 2023 World Rugby Sevens Challenger Series. The tournament was hosted by Australia at the Hugh Courtney Oval in Gatton, west of Brisbane.

Round 1

19 Nov
8:22 AM

Samoa	59–0	Vanuatu

Hugh Courtney Oval, UQ Gatton

19 Nov
8:44 AM

Papua New Guinea	33–0	Tonga

Hugh Courtney Oval, UQ Gatton

Round 2

19 Nov
10:34 AM

Cook Islands	41–5	Vanuatu

Hugh Courtney Oval, UQ Gatton

19 Nov
10:56 AM

Solomon Islands	0–33	Tonga

Hugh Courtney Oval, UQ Gatton

19 Nov
11:18 AM

Papua New Guinea	21–5	Samoa

Hugh Courtney Oval, UQ Gatton

Round 3

19 Nov
1:32 PM

Solomon Islands	22–5	Vanuatu

Hugh Courtney Oval, UQ Gatton

19 Nov
1:54 PM

Samoa	26–5	Tonga

Hugh Courtney Oval, UQ Gatton

19 Nov
2:15 PM

Papua New Guinea	27–5	Cook Islands

Hugh Courtney Oval, UQ Gatton

Round 4

20 Nov
8:00 AM

Vanuatu	10–24	Tonga

Hugh Courtney Oval, UQ Gatton

20 Nov
8:22 AM

Samoa	19–7	Cook Islands

Hugh Courtney Oval, UQ Gatton

Nov 20
8:44 AM

Papua New Guinea	48–0	Solomon Islands

Hugh Courtney Oval, UQ Gatton

Round 5

20 Nov
10:34 AM

Cook Islands	0–19	Tonga

Hugh Courtney Oval, UQ Gatton

20 Nov
10:58 AM

Papua New Guinea	54–5	Vanuatu

Hugh Courtney Oval, UQ Gatton

20 Nov
11:18 AM

Samoa	37–0	Solomon Islands

Hugh Courtney Oval, UQ Gatton

Round 6

20 Nov
1:54 PM

Solomon Islands	22–5	Vanuatu

Hugh Courtney Oval, UQ Gatton

20 Nov
3:22 PM

Tonga	26–15	Cook Islands

Hugh Courtney Oval, UQ Gatton

Finals

5th place: 20 Nov

Cook Islands	def.	Vanuatu

Hugh Courtney Oval, UQ Gatton

3rd place: 20 Nov

Tonga	def.	Cook Islands

Hugh Courtney Oval, UQ Gatton

1st place: 20 Nov

Papua New Guinea	abandoned	Samoa

Hugh Courtney Oval, UQ Gatton

Challenge placings

Place	Team
1	Papua New Guinea
2	Samoa
3	Tonga
4	Cook Islands
5	Solomon Islands
6	Vanuatu

== See also ==
- 2022 Oceania Sevens Championship (for men's teams)
