= 2018 Oceania Women's Sevens Championship =

Eighth Oceania Women's Sevens tournament

- Host nation: Fiji
- Date: 9–10 November 2018

Cup
- Champion: Australia
- Runner-up: New Zealand
- Third: Fiji

Tournament details
- Matches played: 20

The 2018 Oceania Women's Sevens Championship was the eighth Oceania Women's Sevens tournament. It was held in Suva, Fiji on 9–10 November 2018.

Australia won the tournament by defeating defending champions New Zealand in a thrilling final, 14-10. While host Fiji beat Papua New Guinea for third place. Papua New Guinea as the highest ranked non-core team for the 2018–19 World Rugby Women's Sevens Series qualified for the 2019 Sydney Women's Sevens and 2019 Hong Kong Women's Sevens.

== Teams ==
- Australia
- Cook Islands
- Fiji
- Nauru
- New Caledonia
- New Zealand
- Papua New Guinea
- Samoa

== Pool stage ==
All times are Fiji Summer Time (UTC+13:00)

=== Pool A ===
Teams	Pld	W	D	L	PF	PA	+/−	Pts
Australia	3	3	0	0	134	0	+134	9
Papua New Guinea	3	2	0	1	55	48	+7	7
Samoa	3	1	0	2	72	64	+8	5
Nauru	3	0	0	3	0	149	−149	3

9 November 2018

Papua New Guinea	19–17	Samoa

ANZ National Stadium

9 November 2018

Australia	58–0	Nauru

ANZ National Stadium

9 November 2018

Papua New Guinea	36–0	Nauru

ANZ National Stadium

9 November 2018

Australia	45–0	Samoa

ANZ National Stadium

9 November 2018

Samoa	55–0	Nauru

ANZ National Stadium

9 November 2018

Australia	31–0	Papua New Guinea

ANZ National Stadium

=== Pool B ===
Teams	Pld	W	D	L	PF	PA	+/−	Pts
New Zealand	3	3	0	0	113	8	+105	9
Fiji	3	2	0	1	72	44	+28	7
Cook Islands	3	1	0	2	38	64	−26	5
New Caledonia	3	0	0	3	15	122	−107	3

9 November 2018

Fiji	26–7	Cook Islands

ANZ National Stadium

9 November 2018

New Zealand	45–8	New Caledonia

ANZ National Stadium

9 November 2018

Fiji	46–0	New Caledonia

ANZ National Stadium

9 November 2018

New Zealand	31–0	Cook Islands

ANZ National Stadium

9 November 2018

Cook Islands	31–7	New Caledonia

ANZ National Stadium

9 November 2018

New Zealand	37–0	Fiji

ANZ National Stadium

== Knockout stage ==
5th to 8th bracket

Semi-finals
10 November 2018
Cook Islands	19
Nauru	0
10 November 2018
Samoa	45
New Caledonia	5

Fifth Place
10 November 2018
Cook Islands	5
Samoa	10
Seventh Place
10 November 2018
Nauru	7
New Caledonia	21

Cup

Semi-finals
10 November 2018
New Zealand	31
Papua New Guinea	0
10 November 2018
Australia	29
Fiji	0

Final
10 November 2018
Australia	14
New Zealand	10
Third place
10 November 2018
Papua New Guinea	5
Fiji	33

== Standings ==
Legend
Qualified to 2019 Sydney Women's Sevens and 2019 Hong Kong Women's Sevens
Already qualified

Rank	Team
1st place, gold medalist(s)	Australia
2nd place, silver medalist(s)	New Zealand
3rd place, bronze medalist(s)	Fiji
4	Papua New Guinea
5	Samoa
6	Cook Islands
7	New Caledonia
8	Nauru

== See also ==
- 2019 Hong Kong Women's Sevens
