= Samoa women's national rugby sevens team =

Samoa
- Union: Samoa Rugby Union
Team kit

World Cup Sevens
- Appearances: 0

The Samoa women's national rugby sevens team (Samoan: ʻau lakapī toʻafitu tamaʻitaʻi o Sāmoa) represents Samoa in international women's rugby sevens. Samoa competed in the 2011 Pacific Games and were runners-up after losing to Fiji. At the 2015 Pacific Games they defeated Tonga at the fifth place match.

== History ==
At the Oceania Women's Sevens Championship, Samoa placed second in 2007 and were fourth in 2008, 2013 and 2014. They competed at the 2020 Women's Rugby Sevens Final Olympic Qualification Tournament in Monaco but were unsuccessful to make it to the Tokyo Olympics.

== Tournament History ==
=== Pacific Games ===
Pacific Games
Year	Round	Position	Pld	W	D	L
(New Caledonia) 2011	Final	2nd place, silver medalist(s)	7	5	0	2
(Papua New Guinea) 2015	5th Place Play-off	5th	7	2	1	4
(Samoa) 2019	Bronze Medal Match	4th	6	3	0	3
Total	0 Titles	3/3	20	10	1	9

=== Oceania Women's Sevens ===
Oceania Women's Sevens
Year	Round	Position	Pld	W	D	L
(Papua New Guinea) 2007	Cup Final	2nd place, silver medalist(s)	4	1	1	2
(Samoa) 2008	Bronze Final	4th	6	1	0	5
(Fiji) 2012	Plate Final	5th	6	3	0	3
(Australia) 2013	Bronze Final	4th	6	1	0	5
(Australia) 2014	Round-robin	4th	6	3	0	3
(New Zealand) 2015	Cup Final	2nd place, silver medalist(s)	6	3	0	3
(Fiji) 2016	Round-robin	5th	6	2	0	4
(Fiji) 2017	5th–8th Place Playoff	5th	4	2	0	2
(Fiji) 2018	5th Place Playoff	5th	5	1	0	4
(Fiji) 2019	5th Place Playoff	5th	5	3	0	2
(Australia) 2021	Did Not Compete					
(New Zealand) 2022	Did Not Compete					
(Australia) 2023	5th Place Playoff	5th	5	3	0	2
Total	0 Titles	11/13	59	23	1	35

=== Oceania Rugby Sevens Challenge ===
Year	Round	Position	Pld	W	D	L
(Australia) 2022	Round 6	2nd	5	4	0	1
Total	0 Titles	1/1	5	4	0	1
