= Cook Islands women's national rugby sevens team =

Cook Islands
- Union: Cook Islands Rugby Union
Team kit

World Cup Sevens
- Best result: 0

The Cook Islands women's national sevens rugby union team is Cook Islands national representative in Rugby sevens.

== History ==
The Cook Islands competed at the 2015 Oceania Women's Sevens Championship and qualified for the Olympic repechage after placing third. Cook Islands did not qualify for Rio 2016, however, they defeated Hong Kong 17–12 to win the bowl final.

They made an appearance at the 2022 Oceania Rugby Sevens Challenge in Brisbane with a fourth-place finish overall. They also featured at the 2023 Oceania Women's Sevens, they beat newcomers, American Samoa, to win seventh place.

== Players ==
Squad to the 2023 Pacific Games:

Players
Kaiyah Atai
Rima Browne
Scarlet Heather
Chantelle Holloway-Samuels
Chantay Kiria-Ratu
Chelsea Makira
Tamira Metuangaro
Maya Mokoroa
Paulina Morris-Ponga
Manea Poa
Vaine Puri
Chantelle Schofield
Kiana Sword-Tua
Harriet Tuara
Charlize Tumu-Makara
Maruia Willie

=== Previous squads ===
Squad at 2019 Oceania Women's Sevens Championship

- Beniamina Koiatu
- Chrystal Leota
- Dayna Napa
- Jennifer Reu
- Margaret Nena
- Joan Isaaka
- Tari Arere
- Wairakau Greig
- Crystal Tamarua
- Ngatokotoru Akakua
- Kaiyah Atai
- Lydia Turua-Quedley

The 2019 team was managed by Opuramiti Samuel and coached by Friends Tairea.

== Tournament History ==
=== Pacific Games ===
Pacific Games
Year	Round	Position	Pld	W	D	L
(New Caledonia) 2011	5th Place Playoff	5th	7	3	1	3
(Papua New Guinea) 2015	Did not compete					
(Samoa) 2019	Did not compete					
(Solomon Islands) 2023	7th Place Playoff	7th	5	1	0	4
Total	0 Titles	1/4	12	4	1	7

=== Oceania Women's Sevens ===
Oceania Women's Sevens
Year	Round	Position	Pld	W	D	L
(Samoa) 2008	Did not compete					
(Fiji) 2012	7th Place Playoff	7th	6	1	0	5
(Australia) 2013	Did not compete					
(Australia) 2014	Round-robin	6th	6	0	0	6
(New Zealand) 2015	3rd Place Playoff	3rd place, bronze medalist(s)	6	4	0	2
(Fiji) 2016	Round-robin	4th	6	3	0	3
(Fiji) 2017	N/A (Note: adverse weather conditions affected the schedule of the games)	5th (Draw)	4	2	1	1
(Fiji) 2018	5th Place Playoff	6th	5	2	0	3
(Fiji) 2019	9th Place Playoff	9th	5	2	0	3
(Australia) 2021	Did not compete					
(New Zealand) 2022	Did not compete					
(Australia) 2023	7th Place Playoff	7th	5	2	0	3
Total	0 Titles	8/12	43	16	1	26

- Note:

=== Oceania Rugby Sevens Challenge ===
Year	Round	Position	Pld	W	D	L
(Australia) 2022	3rd Place Playoff	4th	6	1	0	5
Total	0 Titles	1/1	6	1	0	5
