= Rugby sevens at the 2015 Pacific Games – Women's tournament =

Rugby sevens – Women's tournament at the 2015 Pacific Games
- Venue: Sir John Guise Stadium
- Location: Port Moresby, Papua New Guinea
- Dates: 8–10 July 2015
- Nations: 7

Medalists
gold medal	Fiji
silver medal	Australia
bronze medal	Papua New Guinea

The Women's rugby sevens tournament at the 2015 Pacific Games was held in Port Moresby from 8 to 10 July 2015 at the Sir John Guise Stadium. Fiji won the gold medal defeating Australia by 12–10 in the final. Hosts PNG took the bronze medal defeating New Caledonia 15–0.

== Participants ==
Seven teams played in the tournament:

- Australia
- Fiji
- New Caledonia
- Papua New Guinea
- Samoa
- Tahiti
- Tonga

== Squads ==
Rugby Union 7s Teams (player numbers as assigned for 2015 Pacific Games)
Australia	Fiji	New Caledonia
1. Mollie Gray; 2. Tanisha Stanton; 3. Nikki Etheridge; 4. Sarah Halvorsen; 5. Mahalia Murphy; 6. Nicole Beck (captain); 7. Georgina Friedrichs; 8. Taleena Simon; 9. Dominique Du Toit; 10. Brooke Anderson; 11. Laura Waldie; 12. Brooke Walker	1. Litia Naiqato; 2. Asinate Savu; 3. Talica Vodo; 4. Elina Ratauluva; 5. Rusila Tamoi; 6. Timaima Tamoi; 7. Timaima Ravisa; 8. Lavenia Tinai; 9. Ana Maria Roqica; 10. Rusila Nagasau; 11. Akosita Ravato; 12. Luisa Tisolo	1. Shirley Benemie; 2. Djesy Gaia; 3. Lydie Wamejo; 4. Manon Boudet; 5. Theresa Boulouguen; 6. Louise Waiane; 7. Vanessa Beaudouin; 8. Claire Hillaireau; 9. Yolaine Yengo; 10. Marie Hélène Wahnawe; 11. Anne-Marie Waitreu; 12. Marie Aymeric
Papua New Guinea	Samoa	(French Polynesia) Tahiti
1. Cassandra Samson; 2. Alice Alois; 3. Amelia Kuk; 4. Lynette Kwarula; 5. Trisilla Rema; 6. Dulcie Bomai; 7. Menda Ipat; 8. Freda Waula; 9. Kymlie Rapilla; 10. Naomi Alapi; 11. Geua Larry; 12. Joanna Lagona	1. Apaula Enesi; 2. Vanessa Afamasaga; 3. Mellisha Leaana; 4. Maria Jacinta Ausai; 5. Virginia Iona Sofara; 6. Suititi Ailaoa; 7. Soteria Pulumu; 8. Seifono Misili; 9. Tina Jones; 10. Pepe Mataipule; 11. Tafale Roma Malesi	1. Nawei Remini; 2. Hanaley Teuira; 3. Raitiare Tihani Tokoragi; 4. Eva Huchede; 5. Vainui Frogier; 6. Maruiata Hurahutia; 7. Cloe Devaluez; 8. Herenui Tehuiotoa; 9. Toimata Mooria; 10. Meihiti Teriinohopuaiterai; 11. Anais Heimata Temarii; 12. Florine Tevero
Tonga
1. Nina Alofaki; 2. Isapela Kamoto; 3. Sela Vaenuku; 4. Eseta Vi; 5. Ema Potaufa; 6. Losaline Potaufa; 7. Kiana Muamoholeva; 8. Sharon Vailea; 9. Pesalini Lave; 10. Seini Haukinima; 11. Lesila Lautaimi; 12. Fakaola Malungahu

== Format ==
The teams played a round-robin followed by play-offs for the medals and fifth place.

== Preliminary round ==
Teams	Pld	W	D	L	PF	PA	+/−	Pts
Australia	6	6	0	0	178	19	+159	18
Fiji	6	5	0	1	211	26	+185	16
Papua New Guinea	6	4	0	2	101	65	+36	14
New Caledonia	6	2	1	3	70	122	–52	11
Tonga	6	2	0	4	75	108	–33	10
Samoa	6	1	1	4	57	84	–27	9
Tahiti	6	0	0	6	0	266	–266	6
Updated: 10 July 2015 Source: Port Moresby 2015 • Teams ranked 1 and 2 (Green background) advanced to the Gold final. • Teams ranked 3 and 4 (Blue background) advanced to the Bronze final. • Teams ranked 5 and 6 (Purple background) advanced to the Fifth place play-off.

=== Day 1 ===
8 July 2015
12:00

Australia	26–7	Fiji

Sir John Guise Stadium, Port Moresby

8 July 2015
12:22

New Caledonia	5–33	Papua New Guinea

Sir John Guise Stadium, Port Moresby

8 July 2015
12:44

Samoa	35–0	Tahiti

Sir John Guise Stadium, Port Moresby

8 July 2015
15:18

Australia	22–5	New Caledonia

Sir John Guise Stadium, Port Moresby

8 July 2015
15:40

Fiji	33–0	Samoa

Sir John Guise Stadium, Port Moresby

8 July 2015
16:02

Papua New Guinea	10–7	Tonga

Sir John Guise Stadium, Port Moresby

8 July 2015
18:36

Australia	59–0	Tahiti

Sir John Guise Stadium, Port Moresby

8 July 2015
18:58

Fiji	29–0	Papua New Guinea

Sir John Guise Stadium, Port Moresby

8 July 2015
19:20

New Caledonia	17–10	Tonga

Sir John Guise Stadium, Port Moresby

=== Day 2 ===
9 July 2015
13:06

Australia	33–0	Tonga

Sir John Guise Stadium, Port Moresby

9 July 2015
13:28

Fiji	45–0	Tahiti

Sir John Guise Stadium, Port Moresby

9 July 2015
13:50

New Caledonia	5–5	Samoa

Sir John Guise Stadium, Port Moresby

9 July 2015
16:24

Australia	19–7	Samoa

Sir John Guise Stadium, Port Moresby

9 July 2015
16:46

Fiji	45-0	Tonga

Sir John Guise Stadium, Port Moresby

9 July 2015
17:08

Papua New Guinea	48–0	Tahiti

Sir John Guise Stadium, Port Moresby

9 July 2015
19:42

Australia	19–0	Papua New Guinea

Sir John Guise Stadium, Port Moresby

9 July 2015
20:04

New Caledonia	38-0	Tahiti

Sir John Guise Stadium, Port Moresby

9 July 2015
20:26

Samoa	5-17	Tonga

Sir John Guise Stadium, Port Moresby

=== Day 3 ===
10 July 2015
12:00

Fiji	52-0	New Caledonia

Sir John Guise Stadium, Port Moresby

10 July 2015
12:22

Papua New Guinea	10-5	Samoa

Sir John Guise Stadium, Port Moresby

10 July 2015
12:44

Tahiti	0-41	Tonga

Sir John Guise Stadium, Port Moresby

== Finals ==
=== Fifth place game ===
10 July 2015
16:46

Tonga	0–5	Samoa
	Report

Sir John Guise Stadium, Port Moresby

=== Bronze medal final ===
10 July 2015
18:36

Papua New Guinea	15–0	New Caledonia
	Report

Sir John Guise Stadium, Port Moresby

=== Gold medal final ===
10 July 2015
18:58

Australia	10–12	Fiji
	Report

Sir John Guise Stadium, Port Moresby

== See also ==
- Rugby sevens at the 2015 Pacific Games – Men's tournament
- Rugby sevens at the Pacific Games
- Pacific Games
