= Papua New Guinea women's national rugby sevens team =

National rugby union 7s women's team

Papua New Guinea
- Union: Papua New Guinea Rugby Football Union
- Nickname: Palais
- Founded: 2007
- Coach: Cecil Davani
- Captain: Alice Alois
Team kit

First international
- Papua New Guinea 17 – 17 Samoa (2007 Pacific Women's Sevens Championship, 1 December 2007)

Largest win
- Papua New Guinea 77 – 0 Tahiti (2017 Oceania Women's Sevens Championship, 10 November 2017)

World Cup Sevens
- Appearances: 1 (First in 2018)

Medal record

Pacific Games
Silver medal – second place	2023 Honiara	Team
Bronze medal – third place	2019 Apia	Team
Bronze medal – third place	2015 Port Moresby	Team
Bronze medal – third place	2011 Nouméa	Team

Oceania Women's Sevens
Bronze medal – third place	2007 Port Moresby	Tournament
Bronze medal – third place	2016 Suva	Tournament

Oceania Women's Sevens Challenge
Gold medal – first place	2022 Gatton	Tournament

The Papua New Guinea women's national rugby sevens team represents Papua New Guinea in international women's rugby sevens tournaments. They are regular participants at the Oceania Women's Sevens Championship and Pacific Games.

== History ==
PNG's first international was in 2007 while hosting the first ever Pacific women's sevens championship (now known as Oceania Women's Sevens Championship) in Port Moresby. They won the 2011 Asia Pacific Women’s Sevens Championship that was held in Kota Kinabalu, Malaysia.

In 2017, the team made their first appearance at the World Rugby Women's Sevens Series as an invited team to the 2017 Sydney Women's Sevens. They debuted at the Women's Sevens World Cup in 2018.

They finished in fourth place at the 2019 Oceania Women's Sevens Championship which earned them a spot at the 2020 Women's Rugby Sevens Final Olympic Qualification Tournament. The Palais did not qualify for the 2020 Tokyo Olympics.

At the 2023 Pacific Games in Honiara, they were defeated by Fiji in the gold medal final and had to settle for silver. They competed in the 2024 World Rugby Sevens Challenger Series in Dubai; they finished ninth overall in the first round. They finished eleventh overall at the 2024 Sevens Challenger Series.

== Tournament history ==
A red box around the year indicates tournaments played within Papua New Guinea

=== World Cup Sevens ===
Rugby World Cup 7s
Year	Round	Position	P	W	L	D
(United Arab Emirates) 2009	did not enter					
(Russia) 2013	did not qualify					
(United States) 2018	15th playoff	15th	4	1	3	0
(South Africa) 2022	did not qualify					
Total	0 Titles	1/4	4	1	3	0

=== Pacific Games ===
Pacific Games 7s
Year	Round	Position	P	W	L	D
(New Caledonia) 2011	Third playoff	3rd place, bronze medalist(s)	7	4	3	0
(Papua New Guinea) 2015	Third playoff	3rd place, bronze medalist(s)	7	5	2	0
(Samoa) 2019	Third playoff	3rd place, bronze medalist(s)	6	4	2	0
(Solomon Islands) 2023	Final	2nd place, silver medalist(s)	5	4	1	0
Total	0 Titles	4/4	25	17	8	0

=== Oceania Women's Sevens ===
Oceania Women's 7s
Year	Round	Position	P	W	L	D	Refs
Pacific 7s
(Papua New Guinea) 2007	Third playoff	3rd place, bronze medalist(s)	4	3	0	1	
Oceania 7s
(Samoa) 2008	did not attend						
(Fiji) 2012	Third playoff	4th	6	3	3	0	
(Australia) 2013	Pool stage	5th	4	0	3	1	
(Australia) 2014	Pool stage	5th	6	3	3	0	
(New Zealand) 2015	Third playoff	4th	6	1	5	0	
(Fiji) 2016	Round-robin	3rd place, bronze medalist(s)	6	4	2	0	
(Fiji) 2017	Third playoff	4th	5	1	3	1	
(Fiji) 2018	Third playoff	4th	5	2	3	0	
(Fiji) 2019	Third playoff	4th	6	4	2	0	
(Australia) 2021	did not attend						
(New Zealand) 2022	withdrew						
(Australia) 2023	Third playoff	4th	6	4	2	0	
Total	0 Titles	10/13	50	22	26	2	

Oceania Sevens Challenge

Oceania Women's 7s Challenge
Year	Round	Position	P	W	L	D
(Australia) 2022	Final	1st place, gold medalist(s)	5	5	0	0

== World Rugby Sevens ==
=== World Rugby women's sevens series ===
Papua New Guinea have been a regular invitational team to the World Rugby Women's Sevens Series particularly at the Australian Women's Sevens (2017−2019, 2023) and New Zealand Women's Sevens (2023).

World Rugby Women's Sevens Series
Season	Rounds	Position	Points
2016–17	1 / 6	14th	1
2017–18	1 / 5	16th	1
2018–19	1 / 6	16th	1
2022–23	2 / 7	14th	2

==== Player records ====
The following shows leading career Papua New Guinean players based on performance in the World Rugby Women's Sevens Series.

Tries scored
No.	Player	Tries
1	Joana Lagona	9
2	Alice Alois	3
3	Cassandra Samson	1
3	Debbie Kaore	1
3	Fatima Rama	1
3	Barbara Sigere	1

Points scored
No.	Player	Points
1	Joana Lagona	49
2	Alice Alois	15
3	Cassandra Samson	5
3	Debbie Kaore	5
3	Fatima Rama	5
3	Barbara Sigere	5

Matches played
No.	Player	Matches
1	Helen Abau	20
2	Fatima Rama	19
2	Kymlie Rapilla	19
4	Marie Biyama	15
4	Lynette Kwarula	15
4	Taiva Lavai	15

=== World Rugby Sevens Challenger Series ===
In 2020, Papua New Guinea were scheduled to compete in the inaugural World Rugby Sevens Challenger Series after being the highest ranked non-core team from Oceania at the 2019 Oceania Women's Sevens Championship in Suva. However, due to the COVID-19 pandemic, World Rugby postponed the tournament without rescheduling a future date, before eventually cancelling it altogether. Therefore, the official inaugural series was in 2022 in which Papua New Guinea gained a direct quota.

World Rugby Sevens Challenger Series
Season	Rounds	Position	Points
2020 season cancelled due to impacts of COVID-19 pandemic.
2022	1 / 1	11th	—N/a
2023	2 / 2	12th	4
2024	3 / 3	11th	8

== Players ==
=== Current squad ===
Papua New Guinea's squad to the 2024 World Rugby Sevens Challenger Series:

Roster

No.	Pos.	Player	Date of birth (age)	Union / Club
1		Barbara Sigere		
2		Joyce Taravuna	13 August 2000 (aged 23)	
3	BK	Alice Alois	28 September 1996 (aged 26)	Capital Rugby Union
4		Magdelene Swaki		
6		Esther Gigmat	10 February 2001 (aged 22)	
7		Naomi Kelly	11 September 1998 (aged 25)	
8		Jessica Refireka		
9		Cynthiah Peters		
10	BK	Fatima Rama	28 January 1981 (aged 42)	Capital Rugby Union
11		Helen Ken Alo		
12		Joanne Lagona	2 January 1989 (aged 34)	
15	FW	Marie Biyama	1 March 1998 (aged 25)	Capital Rugby Union

=== Previous squads ===
Squad to 2019 Pacific Games

The Papua New Guinea Rugby Union announced its women's rugby sevens team on 28 June 2019.

Roster

No.	Pos.	Player	Date of birth (age)	Union / Club
1	FW	Kymlie Rapilla (c)	16 May 1991 (aged 28)	National Capital District
2	FW	Lynette Kwarula	4 July 1990 (aged 29)	National Capital District
3	FW	Marie Biyama	1 March 1998 (aged 21)	Central
4	BK	Fatima Rama	28 January 1981 (aged 38)	Central
5	BK	Taiva Lavai	16 September 1983 (aged 35)	National Capital District
6	BK	Gemma Schnaubelt	20 August 1997 (aged 21)	Queensland
7	BK	Alice Alois	28 September 1996 (aged 22)	National Capital District
8	BK	Yolanda Gittins	20 October 1992 (aged 26)	Queensland
9	FW	Helen Abau	16 May 1991 (aged 28)	Central
10	BK	Marlugu Dixon	17 August 1986 (aged 32)	Queensland
11	FW	Melanie Kawa	11 January 1986 (aged 32)	Queensland
12	BK	Gwen Pokana	29 July 1994 (aged 23)	National Capital District

Squad to 2018 Rugby World Cup Sevens

Head coach: John Larry

No.	Pos.	Player	Date of birth (age)	Union / Club
1	FW	Debbie Kaore	11 September 1989 (aged 28)	New Capital District
2	FW	Melanie Kawa	11 January 1986 (aged 32)	Queensland
3	FW	Lynette Kwarula	4 July 1990 (aged 28)	Central
4	BK	Taiva Lavai	16 September 1983 (aged 34)	New Capital District
5		Cassandra Sampson (c)	15 November 1989 (aged 28)	Central
6	BK	Gemma Schnaubelt	20 August 1997 (aged 20)	Queensland
7	BK	Fatima Rama	28 January 1981 (aged 37)	Central
8		Chelsea Garesa	30 July 1999 (aged 18)	New Capital District
9	BK	Marie Biyama	1 March 1998 (aged 20)	Central
10		Helen Abau	16 May 1991 (aged 27)	Central
11		Marlugu Dixon	17 August 1986 (aged 31)	Queensland
12		Yolanda Gittins	20 October 1992 (aged 25)	Queensland

Squad to 2015 Pacific Games

No.	Pos.	Player	Date of birth (age)	Union / Club
1	BK	Cassandra Samson (c)	15 November 1989 (aged 25)	National Capital District
2	BK	Alice Alois	28 September 1996 (aged 18)	National Capital District
3	FW	Amelia Kuk	22 July 1995 (aged 19)	Queensland
4	FW	Lynette Kwarula	4 July 1990 (aged 25)	Central
5	BK	Trisilla Rema		New Capital District
6	BK	Dulcie Bomai		New Capital District
7	BK	Menda Ipat		National Capital District
8	BK	Freda Waula		New Capital District
9	FW	Kymlie Rapilla	16 May 1991 (aged 24)	New Capital District
10	FW	Naomi Alapi		New Capital District
11	FW	Geua Larry		Central
12	BK	Joana Lagona	2 January 1989 (aged 26)	New Capital District

== See also ==
- Papua New Guinea women's national rugby union team
