= Rugby sevens at the 2023 Pacific Games – Women's tournament =

Women's rugby sevens at the 2023 Pacific Games
- Venue: National Stadium
- Location: Honiara, Solomon Islands
- Dates: 23–25 November 2023
- Competitors: 96
- Teams: 8

Medalists
gold medal	Fiji
silver medal	Papua New Guinea
bronze medal	Wallis and Futuna

The women's rugby sevens tournament at the 2023 Pacific Games was held in the Solomon Islands at the National Stadium. The tournament was played over three days from 23 to 25 November 2023.

Fiji won the gold medal after defeating Papua New Guinea in the final. Wallis and Futuna beat Tonga in the third place playoff to claim bronze.

== Participating teams ==
Eight countries and territories have entered teams for the women's rugby sevens tournament.

- American Samoa
- Cook Islands
- Fiji
- Nauru
- Papua New Guinea
- Solomon Islands (Host)
- Tonga
- Wallis and Futuna

== Pool stage ==
=== Pool A ===
Pos	Team	P	W	D	L	PF	PA	PD	Pts	Qualification
1	Fiji	3	3	0	0	136	0	+136	9	Semifinals
2	Wallis and Futuna	3	2	0	1	32	48	–16	7	Semifinals
3	Solomon Islands	3	1	0	2	29	62	–33	5	
4	Cook Islands	3	0	0	3	17	104	–87	3	

23 November
17:00 PM

Cook Islands	5–22	Solomon Islands

National Stadium, Honiara

23 November
17:24 PM

Fiji	29–0	Wallis and Futuna

National Stadium, Honiara

24 November
11:48 AM

Cook Islands	12–22	Wallis and Futuna

National Stadium, Honiara

24 November
12:12 PM

Fiji	47–0	Solomon Islands

National Stadium, Honiara

24 November
16:48 PM

Solomon Islands	7–10	Wallis and Futuna

National Stadium, Honiara

24 November
17:12 PM

Cook Islands	0–60	Fiji

National Stadium, Honiara

=== Pool B ===
Pos	Team	P	W	D	L	PF	PA	PD	Pts	Qualification
1	Papua New Guinea	3	3	0	0	99	5	+94	9	Semifinals
2	Tonga	3	2	0	1	92	43	+49	7	Semifinals
3	American Samoa	3	1	0	2	46	81	–35	5	
4	Nauru	3	0	0	3	10	118	–108	3	

23 November
13:00 PM

Nauru	0–51	Tonga

National Stadium, Honiara

23 November
13:24 PM

American Samoa	0–35	Papua New Guinea

National Stadium, Honiara

24 November
11:00 AM

American Samoa	10–36	Tonga

National Stadium, Honiara

24 November
11:24 AM

Nauru	0–31	Papua New Guinea

National Stadium, Honiara

24 November
16:00 PM

American Samoa	36–10	Nauru

National Stadium, Honiara

24 November
16:24 PM

Papua New Guinea	33–5	Tonga

National Stadium, Honiara

== Knockout stage ==
=== Championship Semi-finals ===
Semi-finals
25 November – 11:00 AM
Papua New Guinea	26
Wallis and Futuna	5
25 November – 11:24 AM
Fiji	44
Tonga	0

Gold Medal
25 November
Fiji	17
Papua New Guinea	7
Bronze Medal
25 November
Wallis and Futuna	17
Tonga	7

=== 5th–8th Place Semi-finals ===
Semi-finals
25 November – 12:12 PM
American Samoa	21
Cook Islands	12
25 November – 12:12 PM
Solomon Islands	24
Nauru	0

5th Place
25 November
Solomon Islands	19
American Samoa	5
7th Place
25 November
Cook Islands	34
Nauru	0

== Final ranking ==
Pos	Team
1st place, gold medalist(s)	Fiji
2nd place, silver medalist(s)	Papua New Guinea
3rd place, bronze medalist(s)	Wallis and Futuna
4	Tonga
5	Solomon Islands
6	American Samoa
7	Cook Islands
8	Nauru

== See also ==
- Rugby sevens at the Pacific Games
- Rugby sevens at the 2023 Pacific Games – Men's tournament
