= Rugby sevens at the 2011 Pacific Games – Women's tournament =

2011 Pacific Games Women's Rugby 7s
Tournament details
- Host nation: 2011 Pacific Games Women's Rugby 7s
- Venue: Stade Numa Daly, Nouméa
- Dates: 31 August – 2 September 2011
- No. of nations: 7

Final positions
- Champions: Fiji

The 2011 Pacific Games women's rugby sevens tournament was held in New Caledonia from 31 August to 2 September 2011 in Nouméa. This was the inaugural rugby sevens tournament for women at the Pacific Games. Fiji won the gold medal defeating Samoa by 43–7in the final. Papua New Guinea took the bronze defeating New Caledonia by 19–5 in the third place match.

== Participants ==
Seven teams played in the tournament:

- Cook Islands
- Fiji
- Guam
- New Caledonia
- Papua New Guinea
- Samoa
- Tahiti

== Format ==
The teams played a round-robin followed by play-offs for the medals and fifth place.

== Preliminary round ==
Teams	Pld	W	D	L	PF	PA	+/−	Pts
Fiji	6	6	0	0	224	19	205	24
Samoa	6	5	0	1	104	60	44	20
Papua New Guinea	6	3	0	3	135	80	55	12
New Caledonia	6	3	0	3	89	76	13	12
Cook Islands	6	2	1	3	65	96	-31	10
Tahiti	6	0	2	4	34	169	-135	4
Guam	6	0	1	5	24	180	-156	2
Updated: 2 September 2011 • Teams ranked 1 and 2 (Green background) advanced to the Gold final. • Teams ranked 3 and 4 (Blue background) advanced to the Bronze final. • Teams ranked 5 and 6 (Purple background) advanced to the 5th-7th play-offs.

=== Day 1 ===
31 August 2011
10:00

Papua New Guinea	34 – 0	Guam

31 August 2011
10:22

Cook Islands	0 – 10	New Caledonia

Stade Numa Daly, Nouméa

31 August 2011
10:44

Samoa	27 – 0	Tahiti

Stade Numa Daly, Nouméa

31 August 2011
11:20

Papua New Guinea	0 – 26	Fiji

Stade Numa Daly, Nouméa

31 August 2011
11:42

Cook Islands	22 – 5	Guam

Stade Numa Daly, Nouméa

31 August 2011
12:04

Samoa	14 – 5	New Caledonia

Stade Numa Daly, Nouméa

31 August 2011
13:20

Papua New Guinea	42 – 5	Tahiti

Stade Numa Daly, Nouméa

31 August 2011
13:42

Cook Islands	7 – 36	Fiji

Stade Numa Daly, Nouméa

31 August 2011
14:04

Samoa	17 – 7	Guam

Stade Numa Daly, Nouméa

31 August 2011
15:32

Papua New Guinea	33 – 17	New Caledonia

Stade Numa Daly, Nouméa

31 August 2011
15:54

Cook Islands	12 – 12	Tahiti

Stade Numa Daly, Nouméa

31 August 2011
16:16

Samoa	12 – 29	Fiji

Stade Numa Daly, Nouméa

=== Day2 ===
1 September 2011
10:00

Guam	12 – 12	Tahiti

Stade Numa Daly, Nouméa

1 September 2011
10:22

Cook Islands	7 – 19	Samoa

Stade Numa Daly, Nouméa

1 September 2011
10:44

Fiji	24 – 0	New Caledonia

Stade Numa Daly, Nouméa

1 September 2011
12:12

Papua New Guinea	12 – 15	Samoa

Stade Numa Daly, Nouméa

1 September 2011
12:34

Fiji	71 – 0	Guam

Stade Numa Daly, Nouméa

1 September 2011
12:56

Tahiti	5 – 33	New Caledonia

Stade Numa Daly, Nouméa

1 September 2011
14:24

Papua New Guinea	14 – 17	Cook Islands

Stade Numa Daly, Nouméa

1 September 2011
14:46

Guam	0 – 24	New Caledonia

Stade Numa Daly, Nouméa

1 September 2011
15:08

Fiji	43 – 0	Tahiti

Stade Numa Daly, Nouméa

== Knockout stage ==
=== 5th–7th play-offs ===
Seventh place knockout			Fifth place
			1	Cook Islands	10
2	Guam	27		Guam	5
3	Tahiti	0

==== Seventh place knockout ====
2 September 2011
13:14

Guam	27 – 0	Tahiti

Stade Numa Daly, Nouméa

==== Fifth place ====
2 September 2011
15:58

Cook Islands	10 – 5	Guam

Stade Numa Daly, Nouméa

=== Medal play-offs ===
==== Third place ====
2 September 2011
18:03

Papua New Guinea	19 – 5	New Caledonia

Stade Numa Daly, Nouméa

==== Final ====
2 September 2011
19:38

Fiji	43 – 7	Samoa

Stade Numa Daly, Nouméa

== See also ==
- Men's Rugby sevens at the 2011 Pacific Games
- Rugby sevens at the Pacific Games
- Pacific Games
