= 2021 Oceania Women's Sevens Championship =

Tenth Oceania Women's Sevens tournament

- Host nation: Australia
- Date: 25–27 June 2021

Cup
- Champion: New Zealand
- Runner-up: Australia
- Third: Fiji

Tournament details
- Matches played: 12

The 2021 Oceania Women's Sevens Championship was held in Townsville, Australia on the weekend of 25–27 June 2021. The rugby sevens event was sponsored by the PacificAus Sports program (Australian Department of Foreign Affairs and Trade), and was the tenth Oceania Women's Sevens Championship.

The competition was the final official tournament for Oceania Rugby women's national teams ahead of the Tokyo Olympic Sevens. It was played as a double round-robin format at the North Queensland Stadium, commercially known as Queensland Country Bank Stadium. New Zealand won the tournament undefeated, with Australia as runner-up.

== Teams ==
Four women's teams competed at the 2021 tournament:

- Australia
- Fiji
- New Zealand
- Oceania Barbarians

== Tournament ==
The tournament mirrored the Olympic three-day schedule, with each team playing two matches per day. Each team played the other three teams twice. The highest ranked team after all matches were completed was declared the champion.

=== Standings ===
Pos	Team	P	W	D	L	PF	PA	PD	Pts
1	New Zealand	6	6	0	0	205	43	+162	24
2	Australia	6	3	0	3	123	110	+13	15
3	Fiji	6	3	0	3	97	127	−30	15
4	Oceania Barbarians	6	0	0	6	45	190	−145	6

=== Round 1 ===
25 Jun
14:44

New Zealand	51–0	Oceania Barbarians

North Queensland Stadium, Townsville

25 Jun
15:06

Australia	31–17	Fiji

North Queensland Stadium, Townsville

=== Round 2 ===
25 Jun
18:14

New Zealand	33–14	Fiji

North Queensland Stadium, Townsville

25 Jun
18:36

Australia	38–7	Oceania Barbarians

North Queensland Stadium, Townsville

=== Round 3 ===
26 Jun
12:44

Fiji	21–12	Oceania Barbarians

North Queensland Stadium, Townsville

26 Jun
13:06

New Zealand	34–5	Australia

North Queensland Stadium, Townsville

=== Round 4 ===
26 Jun
18:14

New Zealand	34–7	Oceania Barbarians

North Queensland Stadium, Townsville

26 Jun
18:36

Australia	12–19	Fiji

North Queensland Stadium, Townsville

=== Round 5 ===
27 Jun
13:14

New Zealand	27–12	Fiji

North Queensland Stadium, Townsville

27 Jun
13:36

Australia	32–7	Oceania Barbarians

North Queensland Stadium, Townsville

=== Round 6 ===
27 Jun
18:33

Fiji	14–12	Oceania Barbarians

North Queensland Stadium, Townsville

27 Jun
18:55

New Zealand	26–5	Australia

North Queensland Stadium, Townsville

== Placings ==
Place	Team
1st place, gold medalist(s)	New Zealand
2nd place, silver medalist(s)	Australia
3rd place, bronze medalist(s)	Fiji
4	Oceania Barbarians

== See also ==
- 2021 Oceania Sevens Championship (for men's teams)
