= Rugby sevens at the 2019 Pacific Games – Women's tournament =

Women's rugby sevens at the 2019 Pacific Games
- Venue: St Joseph's Sports Field
- Location: Lotopa, Samoa
- Dates: 12–13 July 2019
- Teams: 8

Medalists
gold medal	Fiji
silver medal	Australia
bronze medal	Papua New Guinea

The women's rugby sevens tournament at the 2019 Pacific Games was held in Lotopa, Samoa. It was hosted at the St Joseph's Sports Field from 12 to 13 July 2019. Fiji won the gold medal with a 19-5 victory over Australia in the final.

== Participating nations ==
Eight teams with 12 players in each squad played in the tournament.

- American Samoa
- Australia
- Fiji
- Nauru
- New Caledonia
- Papua New Guinea
- Samoa
- Solomon Islands

== Pool stage ==
=== Pool A ===
Teams	Pld	W	D	L	PF	PA	+/−	Pts
Australia	3	3	0	0	147	0	+147	9
Samoa	3	2	0	1	61	38	+23	7
New Caledonia	3	1	0	2	29	70	–41	5
American Samoa	3	0	0	3	5	134	–129	3

12 July 2019
8:44

Australia	64–0	American Samoa

St Joseph's Sports Field, Lotopa

12 July 2019
9:06

Samoa	20–0	New Caledonia

St Joseph's Sports Field, Lotopa

12 July 2019
11:40

Samoa	41–0	American Samoa

St Joseph's Sports Field, Lotopa

12 July 2019
12:02

Australia	45–0	New Caledonia

St Joseph's Sports Field, Lotopa

12 July 2019
15:00

New Caledonia	29–5	American Samoa

St Joseph's Sports Field, Lotopa

12 July 2019
15:22

Australia	38–0	Samoa

St Joseph's Sports Field, Lotopa

=== Pool B ===
Teams	Pld	W	D	L	PF	PA	+/−	Pts
Fiji	3	3	0	0	138	5	+133	9
Papua New Guinea	3	2	0	1	105	38	+67	7
Nauru	3	1	0	2	27	105	-78	5
Solomon Islands	3	0	0	3	0	122	-122	3

12 July 2019
8:00

Fiji	42–0	Solomon Islands

St Joseph's Sports Field, Lotopa

12 July 2019
8:22

Papua New Guinea	47–0	Nauru

St Joseph's Sports Field, Lotopa

12 July 2019
10:56

Papua New Guinea	53-0	Solomon Islands

St Joseph's Sports Field, Lotopa

12 July 2019
11:18

Fiji	58-0	Nauru

St Joseph's Sports Field, Lotopa

12 July 2019
14:16

Nauru	27-0	Solomon Islands

St Joseph's Sports Field, Lotopa

12 July 2019
14:38

Fiji	38-5	Papua New Guinea

St Joseph's Sports Field, Lotopa

== Knockout stage ==
=== Quarter-finals ===
13 July 2019
9:28

Australia	50-0	Solomon Islands

St Joseph's Sports Field, Lotopa

13 July 2019
9:50

New Caledonia	0-40	Papua New Guinea

St Joseph's Sports Field, Lotopa

13 July 2019
10:12

Samoa	41-5	Nauru

St Joseph's Sports Field, Lotopa

13 July 2019
10:34

American Samoa	0-59	Fiji

St Joseph's Sports Field, Lotopa

=== 5th-8th Semi-finals ===
13 July 2019
12:24

Solomon Islands	10-15	New Caledonia

St Joseph's Sports Field, Lotopa

13 July 2019
12:46

Nauru	22-5	American Samoa

St Joseph's Sports Field, Lotopa

=== Semi-finals ===
13 July 2019
13:08

Australia	31-7	Papua New Guinea

St Joseph's Sports Field, Lotopa

13 July 2019
13:30

Samoa	0-31	Fiji

St Joseph's Sports Field, Lotopa

=== 7th-place play-off ===
13 July 2019
15:22

Solomon Islands	19-5	American Samoa

St Joseph's Sports Field, Lotopa

=== 5th-place play-off ===
13 July 2019
15:44

New Caledonia	19-12	Nauru

St Joseph's Sports Field, Lotopa

=== Bronze medal match ===
13 July 2019
16:04

Papua New Guinea	28-12	Samoa

St Joseph's Sports Field, Lotopa

=== Gold medal match ===
13 July 2019
16:50

Australia	5-19	Fiji

St Joseph's Sports Field, Lotopa

== See also ==
- Rugby sevens at the Pacific Games
- Rugby sevens at the 2019 Pacific Games – Men's tournament
