= Fiji women's national rugby sevens team =

Fiji
- Union: Fiji Rugby Union
- Nickname: Fijiana
- Coach: Richard Walker
- Captain: Rusila Nagasau
- Most caps: Rusila Nagasau (198)
- Top scorer: Ana Naimasi (411)
- Most tries: Ana Naimasi (71)
Team kit	Change kit

World Cup Sevens
- Appearances: 3 (First in 2013)
- Best result: 5th (2022)

The Fiji women's national rugby sevens team represents Fiji at regional and international sevens tournaments.

They have won four Pacific Games gold medals, two Oceania Championships, a silver medal at the Commonwealth Games and a bronze medal at the Summer Olympics. They also compete in the World Rugby Sevens Series and Rugby World Cup Sevens.

== History ==
Fiji won the gold medal at the 2011 Pacific Games in Nouméa, New Caledonia. They qualified for the 2013 Rugby World Cup Sevens in Russia where they won the Bowl final. The Fijiana won the 2015 Oceania Women's Sevens in Auckland and qualified for the 2016 Rio Olympics.

In 2018, they competed at the Commonwealth Games in Australia and placed fifth overall. Later in July, they participated at the 2018 Rugby World Cup Sevens and finished in 11th place.

Fiji also qualified for the 2020 Summer Olympics in Tokyo and went on to win the bronze medal after defeating Great Britain.

They claimed their fourth Pacific Games gold medal in 2023 after their victory over Papua New Guinea in Honiara.

== Tournament history ==
A red box around the year indicates tournaments played within Fiji

=== World Cup ===
Rugby World Cup Sevens
Year	Round	Position	Pld	W	L	D
(United Arab Emirates) 2009	Did not qualify					
(Russia) 2013	Bowl Final	9th	6	3	2	1
(United States) 2018	11th place playoff	11th	4	2	2	0
(South Africa) 2022	5th place final	5th	4	3	1	0
Total	0 Titles	3/4	14	8	5	1

=== Commonwealth Games ===
Commonwealth Games
Year	Round	Position	P	W	L	D
(Australia) 2018	5th place playoff	5th	5	3	2	0
(England) 2022	Gold medal Final	2nd place, silver medalist(s)	5	4	1	0
Total	0 Titles	2/2	10	7	3	0

=== Oceania Women's Sevens ===
Oceania Women's Sevens
Year	Round	Position	Pld	W	L	D
(Papua New Guinea) 2007	Final	1st place, gold medalist(s)	4	4	0	0
(Samoa) 2008	Semi-finalist	3rd place, bronze medalist(s)	4	2	2	0
(Fiji) 2012	Semi-finalist	3rd place, bronze medalist(s)	6	4	2	0
(Australia) 2013	Final	2nd place, silver medalist(s)	6	3	3	0
(Australia) 2014	Group stage	3rd place, bronze medalist(s)	6	4	2	0
(New Zealand) 2015	Final	1st place, gold medalist(s)	6	6	0	0
(Fiji) 2016	Final	2nd place, silver medalist(s)	6	5	1	0
(Fiji) 2017	Cup Finals	3rd place, bronze medalist(s)	5	3	2	0
(Fiji) 2018	Cup Finals	3rd place, bronze medalist(s)	5	3	2	0
(Fiji) 2019	Final	2nd place, silver medalist(s)	6	5	1	0
(Australia) 2021	Final	3rd place, bronze medalist(s)	6	3	3	0
(New Zealand) 2022	Round-robin	3rd place, bronze medalist(s)	6	1	5	0
(Australia) 2023	Final	2nd place, silver medalist(s)	6	5	1	0
Total	2 Titles	13/13	72	48	24	0

=== Summer Olympics ===
Olympic Games record
Year	Round	Position	Pld	W	L	D
(Brazil) 2016	Quarterfinals	8th	6	2	4	0
(Japan) 2020	Bronze Finals	3rd place, bronze medalist(s)	6	4	2	0
(France) 2024	Group stage	12th	5	0	5	0
Total	0 Titles	3/3	17	6	11	0

=== World Rugby Women's Sevens Series ===
World Rugby Women's Sevens Series
Season	Rounds	Position	Points
2012–13	1 / 4	15th	2
2013–14	2 / 5	9th	18
2014–15	6	8th	32
2015–16	5	8th	34
2016–17	6	4th	66
2017–18	5	9th	31
2018–19	6	10th	21
2019–20	5	7th	38
2021	Season cancelled due to impacts of COVID-19 pandemic		
2021–22	4 / 6	3rd	61
2022–23	7	6th	68
2023–24	8	6th (League) 7th (Grand Finals)	68

=== Pacific Games ===
Pacific Games
Year	Round	Position	Pld	W	D	L
(New Caledonia) 2011	Final	1st	7	7	0	0
(Papua New Guinea) 2015	Final	1st	7	6	0	1
(Samoa) 2019	Final	1st	6	6	0	0
(Solomon Islands) 2023	Final	1st	5	5	0	0
Total	4 Titles	4/4	25	24	0	1

== Players ==
=== Current squad ===
Squad named for the 2023 World Rugby HSBC Sevens Series in Vancouver from the 3–5 March.

Caps updated to the latest date: 5 March 2023

(Fiji) Fijiana 7's

#	Player	Position	Height	Weight	Date of birth	Matches	Points scored
1	Talei Wilson	Fullback	1.64 m (5 ft 5 in)	71 kg (157 lb)	September 3, 1995	29	15
2	Ivamere Nabura				April 15, 2001	30	20
3	Adi vani Buleki	Hooker	1.76 m (5 ft 9 in)	79 kg (174 lb)	October 23, 2000	40	40
6	Reapi Ulunisau	Inside Centre	1.63 m (5 ft 4 in)	59 kg (130 lb)	November 2, 1994	52	215
7	Lavena Cavuru	Inside Centre	1.65 m (5 ft 5 in)	64 kg (141 lb)	June 28, 1994	63	181
8	Ana Maria Naimasi	Hooker	1.65 m (5 ft 5 in)	67 kg (148 lb)	February 21, 1994	149	397
9	Ilisapeci Delaiwau	Wing	1.63 m (5 ft 4 in)	65 kg (143 lb)	June 1, 2000	27	20
10	Viniana Riwai	Outside Centre	1.67 m (5 ft 6 in)	72 kg (159 lb)	June 6, 1991	151	201
14	Rusila Nagasau (c)	Inside Centre	1.71 m (5 ft 7 in)	73 kg (161 lb)	August 4, 1987	192	188
15	Vasiti Solikoviti	Blindside Flanker	1.76 m (5 ft 9 in)	76 kg (168 lb)	August 2, 1993	88	70
16	Maria Rokotuisiga	Halfback			June 8, 2001	16	20
17	Meredani Qoro				May 24, 2004	5	15

Coach: Saiasi Fuli
2022–23 World Rugby Women's Sevens Series

=== Award winners ===
The following Fiji Sevens players have been recognised at the World Rugby Awards since 2013:

World Rugby Women's 7s Player of the Year
Year	Nominees	Winners
2021	Alowesi Nakoci	—
2021	Reapi Uluinisau	—
2023	Reapi Uluinisau (2)	—

== See also ==
- Fiji women's national rugby union team
