= Hong Kong Women's Sevens =

Hong Kong Women's 7s
- Current season, competition or edition: 2026 Hong Kong Sevens
- Sport: Rugby sevens
- Founded: 1997
- Country: Hong Kong
- Most recent champion: New Zealand (2026)
- Most titles: New Zealand (4 titles)
- Related competitions: Hong Kong Sevens

The Hong Kong Women's Sevens held the first women's international rugby sevens tournament in 1997, and has since become an annual event. The 2020 edition marked the start of a new era for the Hong Kong Women's Sevens. For the first time, the tournament will be an official event in the World Rugby Women's Sevens Series. The 2020 and 2021 tournaments were cancelled due to the COVID-19 pandemic.

== History ==
The Hong Kong Sevens included a women's tournament for the first time under chairwoman Maria Allen and at the urging of USA 7s coach, Emil Signes. Over the next decade the number of tournaments grew, with almost every region developing regular championships. This reached its zenith with 2009's inaugural women's tournament for the Rugby World Cup Sevens, shortly followed by the announcement that women's rugby sevens would be included in the Olympics from 2016.

New Zealand representative teams have competed in Hong Kong as early as 1997, winning the competition in 1997 and 1999. In 2000 New Zealand sent its first official Women's Sevens team to the Hong Kong Sevens.

== Past champions ==
The following are details of all Hong Kong women's international tournaments played since 1997, listed chronologically with the earliest first, with all result details, where known.

Year	Venue	Cup final			Placings	
		Winner	Score	Runner-up	Plate	Bowl
1997	Hong Kong Stadium	(New Zealand) (Note: New Zealand Wild Ducks and Aotearoa Maori – Prior to the early 2000s, the NZRFU would not condone or send any official team, but an invitation team made up largely of Black Ferns and upcoming talented players did go to the HKG 7s each year in the late nineties from the inception of the HKG tournament. This team was named the Wild Ducks. It had no official status whatsoever, and the matches it played cannot be considered official internationals. The first official NZ team took part in 2000 and 2001, but from 2002 onwards the NZRFU again declined to send a team, whereby interested women's rugby officials from the Bay of Plenty in particular received the union's blessing to send a Maori team "Aotearoa" to HKG. For the first couple of years this team was pretty much strictly Maori in its makeup. However, for the later tournaments Black Ferns and upcoming players of any ethnicity were selected. It is not an official team and its matches should not be considered internationals but it has the union's blessing to compete in international tournaments.); New Zealand Wild Ducks	43–0	United States	Australia	Netherlands
1999	Hong Kong Stadium	(New Zealand); New Zealand Wild Ducks	29–0	United States	Samoa	N/A
2000	Hong Kong Stadium	New Zealand	36–10	Australia	Kazakhstan	Japan
2001	Hong Kong Stadium	New Zealand	22–10	United States	Australia	Hong Kong
2002	Hong Kong Stadium	(New Zealand); Aotearoa Maori	14–7	United States	Kazakhstan	Arabian Gulf
2003	Hong Kong Stadium	Aotearoa Maori	27–0	England	Kazakhstan	Fiji
2004	Hong Kong Stadium	Aotearoa Maori	10–0	Australia	Kazakhstan	United States
2005	Hong Kong Stadium	Aotearoa Maori	19–12	Australia	United States	China
2006	Hong Kong Stadium	Aotearoa Maori	19–12	Australia	United States	Netherlands
2007	Hong Kong Stadium	Aotearoa Maori	10–0	Australia	United States	Kazakhstan
2008	Hong Kong Stadium	United States	21–7	Canada	France	China
2009	Hong Kong Stadium	Australia	24–7	China	Thailand	Papua New Guinea
2010	Hong Kong Stadium	Australia	28–0	China	Thailand	Japan
2011	Hong Kong Stadium	Canada	28–14	France	Netherlands	China
2012	Hong Kong Stadium	England	15–10	Australia	Spain	Brazil
2013	Hong Kong Stadium	Canada	29–0	Australia	South Africa	Ireland
2014	Hong Kong Stadium	Canada	24–0	France	Kazakhstan	Hong Kong
2015	Hong Kong Stadium	Canada	19–12	Japan	China	Papua New Guinea
2016	Hong Kong Stadium	South Africa VII	14–7	France VII	China	Kenya
	World Series qualifier	Winner	Score	Runner-up	Semi-fi	nalists
2017	So Kon Po Recreation Ground	Japan	22–10	South Africa	Belgium	Italy
2018	So Kon Po Recreation Ground	China	31–14	South Africa	Belgium	Kenya
2019	So Kon Po Recreation Ground	Brazil	28–19	Scotland	Japan	Kenya
World Series tournaments in Hong Kong for women's teams were cancelled in 2020 and 2021 due to impacts of the COVID-19 pandemic.
	World Sevens Series	Winner	Score	Runner-up	Semi-fi	nalists
2023	Hong Kong Stadium	New Zealand	26–17	Australia	Great Britain	Fiji
2024	Hong Kong Stadium	New Zealand	36–7	United States	Australia	France

Key:
Dark blue line indicates a tournament included in the World Rugby Women's Sevens Series.

== See also ==
- Hong Kong Sevens (men's tournament)
