= Gayle Broughton =

New Zealand international rugby league & union player

- Born: 5 June 1996 (age 30) Hāwera, New Zealand
- Height: 1.73 m (5 ft 8 in)
- Weight: 70 kg (11 st 0 lb)

Rugby union career
- Position: Utility back
Senior career
Years	Team	Apps	(Points)
2020	Taranaki	3	(315)
National sevens team
Years	Team		Comps
2014–2021	New Zealand		
- Rugby league career

Playing information
- Position: Five-eighth, Fullback
Club
Years	Team	Pld	T	G	FG	P
2022–23	Parramatta Eels	7	1	0	0	4
2023–25	Brisbane Broncos	29	9	0	0	36
2026–	New Zealand Warriors	9	3	0	0	12
	Total	45	13	0	0	52
Representative
Years	Team	Pld	T	G	FG	P
2023	New Zealand Māori	1	0	0	0	0
2024	New Zealand	3	0	0	0	0
- As of 18 November 2026
Medal record
Women's rugby sevens
Representing New Zealand
Olympic Games
Gold medal – first place	2020 Tokyo	Team competition
Silver medal – second place	2016 Rio de Janeiro	Team competition
Commonwealth Games
Gold medal – first place	2018 Gold Coast	Team competition
Rugby World Cup Sevens
Gold medal – first place	2018 San Francisco	Team competition

Gayle Broughton (born 5 June 1996) is a New Zealand rugby league player, who plays at five-eighth for New Zealand Warriors in the NRLW.

She began her NRLW career at the Parramatta Eels in June 2022, where she played one season prior to joining the Brisbane Broncos in 2023.

She formerly played rugby union sevens for the New Zealand women's national rugby sevens team, making her international debut for New Zealand in 2014. She called time on her rugby union career in March 2022, having amassed 315 points in 112 World Series matches. and has won every trophy on offer in the sevens game. Her accomplishments include six World Rugby Sevens series titles, Olympic Games gold and silver medals, Commonwealth Games gold and winning the Rugby World Cup Sevens.

== Early life ==
Gayle Broughton was born in Hāwera, New Zealand, on 5 June 1996 to Karen Broughton and Alfred Hauparoa.

A naturally talented sportswoman with six brothers, Broughton was raised by her Broughton grandparents but had a troubled childhood, which led to her being expelled from high school at the age of 16.

== Rugby union career ==
In 2012, the New Zealand Rugby Union organized a "Go for Gold" campaign to identify talent with the potential to represent New Zealand in the sevens competition at the Rio Olympics. A promise of $10 by her grandmother Patsy Broughton if she would attend the trial being held in Taranaki was sufficient to tempt Broughton to meet Patsy the morning after a party and be driven by her to what she thought would be a "dumb trial". At the trial she was put through various fitness, rugby skill and character assessment activities. She discovered that she liked the game. Of the 800 who attended a trial, Broughton along with Michaela Blyde and Lauren Bayens, who were also from Taranaki, were among the 30 most promising who attended a training camp at Waiouru in mid-2012.

Accepted for the sevens programme, Broughton initially remained in Taranaki, having to get up at 6am to train in New Plymouth alongside Blyde. However, her lack of commitment and repeated failures to turn up for training sessions resulted in her receiving two warnings from the Taranaki Rugby Union, who were supervising her training on behalf of the Sevens coaching staff. At the second warning she was informed that if she did not commit to what was expected she would be dropped. Broughton admits that at the time she did not care about the opportunity she was being given until her grandmother took her aside and urged her not sabotage this opportunity to better herself. This talk prompted Broughton to take the next day’s bus out of Taranaki and relocate to the squad’s training hub at Mount Maunganui. Here she boarded with coach Sean Horan and his family, along with Kelly Brazier and Portia Woodman. It was her first time away from home and for the first three months she absolutely hated the experience.

At the age of 18, Broughton made her international debut for New Zealand in 2014 against Netherlands at the USA Women's Sevens. Later in the year, she was part of the team who won the World Cup in Moscow. She was part of the New Zealand's women's sevens squad that qualified for the Rio Olympics when they won the 2014–15 World Rugby Women's Sevens Series.

=== 2016 Rio Olympic Games ===
Broughton ruptured her anterior cruciate ligament (ACL) at the São Paulo Sevens tournament in February 2016 and opted for a non-surgical treatment that allowed her to play without ligaments in the affected knee. She was selected as a member of the playing team for the 2016 Rio Olympics. She pledged to give her medal to her grandmother if the team won gold. The team scored 109 points and conceded 12 in pool play, before beating USA in the quarter-finals and Great Britain in the semi-finals, before losing 24–17 to Australia in the final. The loss hit the squad hard.

Broughton was a member of the New Zealand team that won gold at the 2018 Commonwealth Games on the Gold Coast. Outside of her Sevens commitments she also played on occasion for the Taranaki Whio, scoring a try and kicked seven points for them against North Harbour in September 2020 in what was the team’s first ever Farah Palmer Cup win.

=== 2020 Tokyo Olympic Games ===
Broughton was selected for the New Zealand Sevens team to complete at the Tokyo Olympics held in 2021. In the semi-final, the Black Ferns Sevens faced a much-improved Fiji, who up until that time had never beaten New Zealand. With the score 17-all at full-time, the game was forced into extra time, during which Broughton who had been bought back onto the field to replace Brazier, scored the winning try. The final score in favour of the Black Ferns was 22-17. The team went on to win the final and claim the gold medal.

In early March 2022, Broughton announced that after nine years she was retiring from rugby to migrate to Australia with her family.

== Rugby league career ==
In April 2022, Broughton began playing with Mounties in the NSWRL Women's Premiership. In early June 2022, the Parramatta Eels announced that Broughton had signed to play for the club in the 2022 NRL Women's season.

At the end of the 2022 season, Broughton was voted by the NRLW players as their Rookie of the Year in the Rugby League Players Association awards.

=== New Zealand Warriors Women ===
On 5 October 2025 it was reported that she had signed for New Zealand Warriors in the NRL Women's Premiership on a 2-year deal.

== Awards and honours ==
- 2021, Joint winner of Taranaki Daily News Person of the Year 2021 with Michaela Blyde.

== Personal life ==
Of Māori descent, Broughton affiliates to the Ngāruahine and Ngāti Ruanui iwi. She is openly lesbian.
