= New Zealand women's national rugby sevens team =

New Zealand
- Union: New Zealand Rugby
- Nickname: Black Ferns Sevens
- Emblem: Silver-fern frond
- Coach: Cory Sweeney
- Captain: Risi Pouri-Lane
- Most caps: Sarah Hirini (277)
- Top scorer: Tyla Nathan-Wong (1,448)
Team kit	Change kit

First international
- New Zealand 54–0 Japan (15 March 1997)

World Cup Sevens
- Appearances: 4 (First in 2009)
- Best result: Champions (2013, 2018)

Official website
- www.allblacks.com/teams/black-ferns-sevens/

The New Zealand women's national rugby sevens team represents New Zealand in the World Rugby Sevens Series, Rugby World Cup Sevens, Summer Olympic Games and the Commonwealth Games.

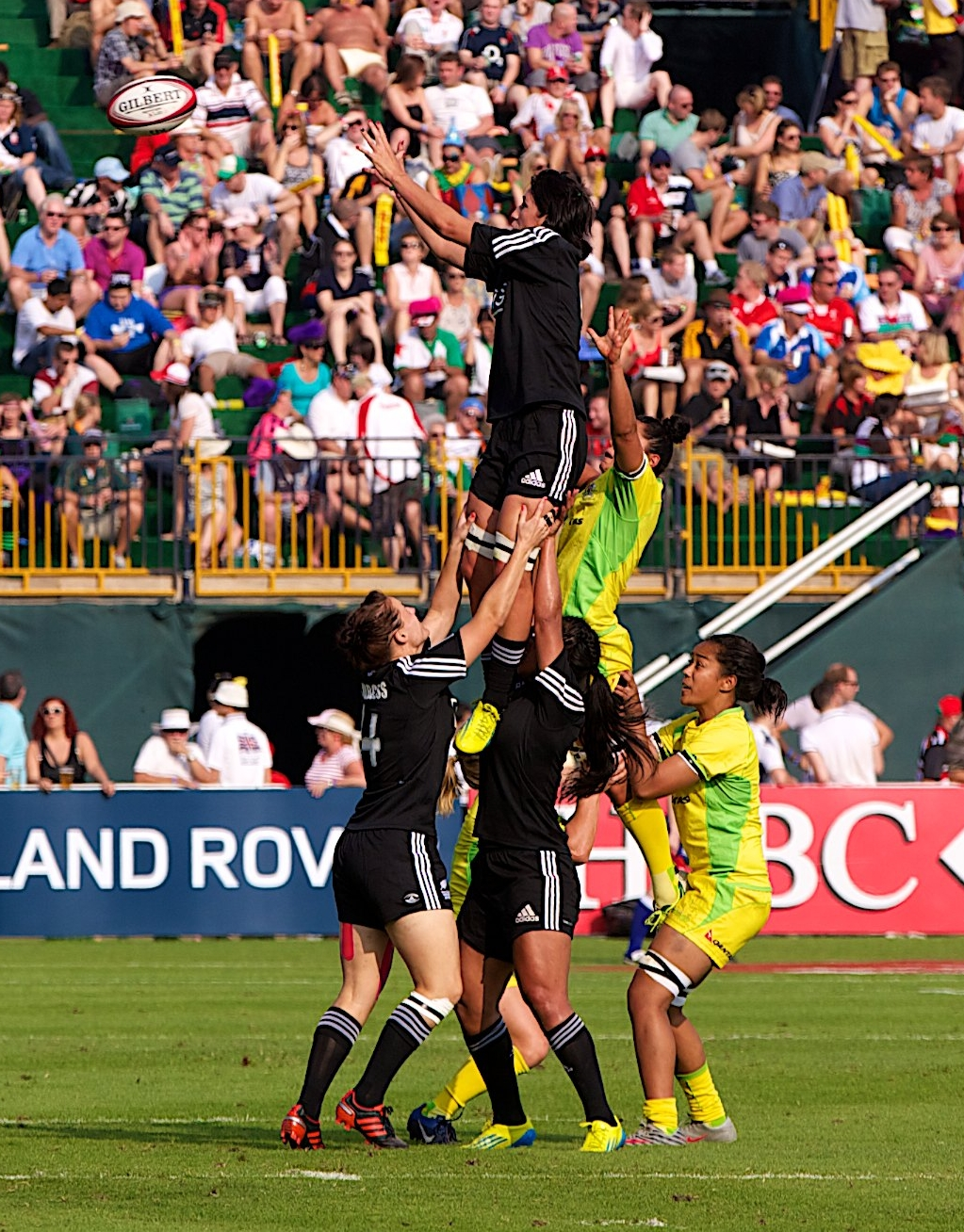
Lineout for New Zealand playing Australia at the Dubai Women Sevens tournament in 2012

A predecessor of the team played for the first time at the 1997 Hong Kong Women's Sevens.

They have won 2 World Cups, 8 Women's Rugby Sevens Series, 4 Oceania Women's Sevens Series, 2 Summer Olympic and 1 Commonwealth tournament. Since 2000 the team has (as of 16 March 2026) won 527 of the 579 games that they have played across all competitions.

== History ==
=== Early days ===
The "New Zealand Wild Ducks", an unofficial women's sevens team, represented New Zealand in the early years of women's rugby sevens. Composed of players such as Anna Richards, Monique Hirovaana, Dianne Apiti (later Kahura), Suzy Shortland, Louisa Wall, Tasha Williams, Annaleah Rush, Mata Young, Sharleen Holden and Ria Ataera, they competed in the inaugural 1997 Hong Kong Women's Sevens tournament and emerged victorious after defeating the United States 43-0 in the final. Richards was named Player of the Tournament. Despite not being officially recognised as a national side by the New Zealand Rugby Union at the time, seven players from the "Wild Ducks" (Hirovaana, Kahura, Richards, Rush, Shortland, Wall and Williams) also represented New Zealand at the 1998 Women's Rugby World Cup, where they clinched the World Championship title under the guidance of coach Darryl Suasua. The Wild Ducks returned to win the 1999 Hong Kong Women's Sevens tournament, once again defeating the United States in the final this time 29-0.

The first official New Zealand women's sevens team was selected in 2000 and was coached by Darryl Suasua. They won the 2000 Hong Kong Sevens after defeating Australia 36–10 in the final. the team consisted of Lavinia Gould, Sherry Hansen, Dianne Kahura, Noi Kurei, Sharleen Nathan (née Holden), Hannah Porter (née Myers), Anna Richards, Annaleah Rush, Suzy Shortland and Tammi Wilson. They returned the next year to win the 2001 tournament by defeating the United States team 22–10 in the final.

==== Aotearoa Māori ====
The New Zealand Rugby Football Union then decided to not fund any subsequent official attendance. Wishing to keep New Zealand involved in the tournament and aware that its presence in Sevens added to the profile of the game the United States sevens coach Emil Signes who was one of the tournament organisers approached Peter Joseph who was coach of the Aotearoa Māori sevens team and asked given it was only a few weeks away if they could come to Hong Kong. This team had been formed in 2000 and had already established a formidable reputation, and had just defeated the United States team in a tournament at Whangarei. Joseph agreed to do so. As they were not endorsed by the New Zealand Rugby Union they were unable to receive any funding from charitable trusts. As Joseph and his wife Shelly were considering moving they sold their house which allowed them to contribute NZ$64,000 to fund the team.

Consisting up of just Māori players, among whom was a 21 year old Honey Hireme, this unofficial New Zealand team won the 2002 tournament, having scored 159 unanswered points before defeating the United States 14-7 in the final. Hong Kong was supposed to be a one off event but given their success Aotearoa Māori decided to return in 2003. However they were told that they would not be allowed to complete as members of the team were selected on race and that instead the Wild Ducks would be invited. Joseph protested and the team was allowed back, this time with the very blonde haired Stephanie Mortimer in the team, which put an end to the complaint. They went on to win the 2003 event. Aotearoa Māori continued their winning streak at Hong Kong, taking out the 2004, 2005, 2006 and the 2007 events. Prior to the 2006 event the organisers objected to 15 year old Sharn Waru playing in what they claimed was an over 18 year old event. Despite it being pointed out that a 17 year old was playing for China and Waru having a clearance to play from the New Zealand Rugby Foot Union it was not until a letter was produced from her uncle Tana Umaga that she was allowed to play. She went on to score the winning try in the final. The team won 33 consecutive matches at Hong Kong between 2002 and 2007, ending the 2007 tournament unbeaten, 195-0. Embarrassed by their success the organisers decreed that only "full national" teams and excluded the team from the 2008 and 2009 tournaments. In 2010 they received a late invitation to attend that years tournament, losing in the semi-final to the eventual tournament winners, the Aussie Amazons. At one point when the Māori Party was in a coalition government with the National Party the team received a grant of $25,000.

Aotearoa Māori were so highly regarded that they played England in May 2008 before the men's final of the London Sevens in the first ever women's seven match held at Twickenham. Among the witnesses were representatives from the Olympics organisation wishing to see if the women were good enough for it to be considered for inclusion in the Olympics. The New Zealanders were beaten 14–10.

From 2010 to 2012 Aotearoa Māori completed in the Roma International Rugby Sevens Tournament. The team for the tournament which was held on 4 and 5 June 2010, consisted of: Julie Ferguson (Captain), Honey Hireme, 17 year old Sarah Hirini, Chyna Hohepa, Chanel Huddleston, Arihiana Marino, Claire Richardson, Karley Te Kawa, Rachel Wikeepa and Amy Williams. The team defeated Russia 47-0 and Spain 17-7 in pool play. Italy 27-5 in the semi-finals and triumphed 19-5 over France in the final. In 2011 with a team consisting of among others, Kat Whata-Simpkins and Renee Wickliffe the team defeated Netherlands, Italy and Germany in pool play, Spain in the semi-final and KUSA 12-10 in the final to again win the tournament. The losing KUSA team consisted of mostly New Zealanders and some Americans. Returning for the final appearance in 2012 with Sarah Hirini, Dionne Ryan, Hazel Tubic and Selica Winiata.among its members Aotearoa Māori defeated Georgia, Olymp and Selezione Italy Cup in pool play, Ukraine in the semi-final and Russia team 24–21 in the final.

Between 2000 and 2012 the team won 14 of the 18 official tournaments that they had entered, defeating 23 different countries. Of the 81 women who served with Aotearoa Māori over its life 34 were to go on to serve either in the Black Ferns or Black Ferns Sevens. Among the nine who were to go on to serve in the Black Ferns Sevens were Honey Hireme, Sarah Hirini, Hazel Tubic and Selica Winiata. Hireme introduced Amy Turner to the team and she played at the Whangarei and Hong Kong tournaments in 2004 before moving to Australia. In 2016 she became a gold medallist with Australia in Sevens at the Rio Olympics.

==== KUSA ====
Among those who served in the team at the 2002 Hong Kong Sevens events was Mere Baker, who by 2009, due to injury and her age was no longer being selected by Aotearoa Māori. To provide them with competition Baker with the support of Ernie Goodhue helped establish the KUSA (Kiwi/USA) Superclub Sevens. Initially most of its players were sourced from those who had missed out on selection for Aotearoa Māori, plus others from Canterbury and the USA. Coached by Baker and Goodhue among those who played for the team were Black Ferns such as Zoey Berry, Kelly Brazier, Olivia Coady, Lavinia Gould, Halie Hurring, Kendra Cocksedge, Amiria Rule, Anika Tiplady and newcomers such as Ruby Tui. The KUSA were beaten in the final of the 2011 Roma International Rugby Sevens Tournament in June 2011 by Aotearoa Māori. The KUSA went on to win the Byron Bay tournament held in October 2011 and a development side (featuring a young Ruby Tui) completed in a Gold Coast tournament in November 2011, losing in the quarter finals to Tonga. As they had no official backing the team had to fund raise to play in tournaments with for example participation in the Gold Coast tournament requiring each member of the team to contribute approximately NZ$3,000, either out of their own pocket or though fundraising.

KUSA ceased to exist after the New Zealand Rugby commenced funding the Black Ferns to compete in the World Series in 2012.

==== First World Cup ====
In July 2008 Darryl Suasua was appointed coach of an officially sanctioned New Zealand women's sevens side to compete in the inaugural Women's Rugby Sevens World Cup which was to held in Dubai in 2009. As a part of the New Zealand's preparations a squad of 29 players assemble in Auckland on 12 July for a three-day trial camp, which would be reduced to 12 to compete in the qualifying tournament in Samoa, on 25–26 July. Selected for the trial squad were: Billy Jean Ale, Fa'anati Aniseko, Victoria Blackledge, Kelly Brazier, Kendra Cocksedge, Exia Edwards, Julie Ferguson, Honey Hireme, Carla Hohepa, Linda Itunu, Jennifer James, Justine Lavea, Vaniya Lavea, Stacey Lene, Huriana Manuel, Angela McGregor, Hannah Porter, Amiria Rule, Melissa Ruscoe, Aroha Savage, Aimee Sutorius, Karley Te Kawa, Teresa Te Tamaki, Ngahuri Thompson, Mallory Townsend, Hazel Tubic, Shaan Waru, Renee Wickliffe and Selica Winiata.

Sixteen teams turned up in Dubai to compete in the World Cup, with New Zealand losing in the final to Australia 15–10. Selica Winiata was the top top women's point scorer.

=== Go for gold ===
In October 2009 the International Olympic Committee agreed by 81 to 8 votes to include rugby sevens in the Rio Olympics.

Aware that it was important to New Zealand's reputation that they field a competitive team, the decision was made by New Zealand Rugby to establish a high performance woman's sevens squad. Tony Philp who was responsible for New Zealand Rugby's men's sevens was allocated NZ$50,000 and assigned the task. Soon after Sean Horan was appointed fulltime coach with support to be provided by the regional sevens resource coaches. The decision was soon made to have the country's 14 national provincial unions host open trials targeted at woman between the ages of 16 and 24 irrespective of whether they had any prior rugby experience. The programme was called "Go for Gold" and used the tag "Got what it takes to Go for Gold" in advertising targeted at young woman. Philip was of the opinion that compared with other countries most New Zealand woman even if they had never played the game would have seen a game and thus had an innate understanding of the game and its terminology.

Allan Bunting who had played men's sevens and had started coaching was recruited in 2012 to assist Philp and Horan. In addition to radio, television and print advertising the trio used their contacts to assist with talent spotting. One thousand online applicants were received of whom 800 attended the trials where they were put through various fitness, rugby skills and character assessment activities. Michaela Blyde was made to attend a trial by her mother Cherry who was a former Black Fern. Blyde was heavily involved in playing soccer at the time and was upset when attendance at a second trial meant missing out on a soccer tournament. A naturally talented sportswoman Gayle Broughton had a troubled childhood, which had led to her being expelled at the age of 16 from high school. Her grandmother promised to give her $10 if she would attend a trial. This was enough to tempt her to meet her grandmother the morning after a party and be driven by her to what she thought would be a "dumb trial".

The most promising 60 then attended a camp at Waiouru Military Camp in mid-2012. This group was further reduced to 30, who then attended a second training camp at Waiouru. Among those selected were Shakira Baker, Blyde, Broughton, as well as Huriana Manuel, Carla Hohepa, Linda Itunu, and Hazel Tubic who had already represented their country in test rugby while Sarah Hirini and Honey Hireme had played with Aotearoa Maori. Ruby Tui and Tyla Nathan-Wong were playing club rugby. Also at Waiouru were semi-professional netballers Kayla McAlister and Portia Woodman, who without telling their coach had enrolled in the Go for Gold program.

After volunteering at various activities Stu Ross joined the coaching team in January 2013 as an analyst. Emphasis now began on improving the squad members skill level, fitness and nutrition. Training of commenced at provincial academes with squad members only paid when the entire squad assembled.

=== First competition ===
The first official Sevens team to see action since the announcement that it would be an Olympic sport was the team which participated in the 2012 Oceania Women's Sevens Championship which was held in Fiji on 3–4 August 2012. The team of 12, consisting of Shakira Baker, Kendra Cocksedge, Moana Forbes, Sarah Hirini (vice-captain), Charlene Halapua, Linda Itunu, Huriana Manuel (captain), Kayla McAlister, Tyla Nathan-Wong, Hazel Tubic, Ruby Tui and Portia Woodman was a mix of newcomers to rugby and experienced fifteen-a-side international players. The team won the tournament, which gained New Zealand entry to the 2013 World Cup in Moscow, Russia, which they won.

Following the team's return to New Zealand canoeist Lisa Carrington visited one of their training camps and bought along her gold medal from London Olympics to inspire them.

While they were not on any salary each team member received a payment of NZ$2,000 per tournament.

=== 2012–2013 Sevens Series season ===
Following the Oceania tournament a team captained by fifteen-a-side Black Fern Huriana Manuel was selected to contest the first tournament of the inaugural 2012–13 IRB Women's Sevens World Series. She was joined by three other fifteen-a-side Black Ferns, Carla Hohepa, Lavinia Gould and Linda Itunu, cross-over netballers Lauren Burgess, Kayla McAlister and Portia Woodman plus former New Zealand age grade soccer representative 19 year old Amanda Rasch. The side also includes emerging talent in the form of Marama Davi, Sarah Hirini and Tyla Nathan-Wong.

The first tournament was held on 30 November and 1 December 2012 in Dubai with the final team consisting of Lauren Burgess, Marama Davis, Sarah Hirini, Lavinia Gould, Carla Hohepa, Chyna Hohepa, Linda Itunu, Kayla McAlister, Huriana Manuel,Tyla Nathan Wong, Tiana Ngawati and Portia Woodman. Ngawati was a late addition to the team after first choice Amanda Rasch dislocated her shoulder in training. New Zealand finished second in their pool after defeating China 31-0, drawing with Russia 12-12 and Canada 12-12. This was sufficient to get them through to the knockout rounds in which they overcame England 31-0 in quarter-finals and Australia 28-14 in the semi-finals. The final was a 41-0 triumph over South Africa. The tournament was mired by Lavinia Gould failing a drug test which led to her eventually being suspended on 9 November 2013 for two years by the IRB. Gould had tested positive for methylhexaneamine (MHA), which was found in a dietary supplement she had used during the tournament.

While six players were retained from the team that had triumphed at Dubai for second round, which was held in Houston on 1–2 February 2013 the completion of the fifteen-a-side 2012 end-of-year tour to England allowed Black Ferns Shakira Baker, Kelly Brazier, Kendra Cocksedge, Halie Hurring and Selica Winiata to be included. Winiata was a welcome addition after an impressive performance which saw her named player of the tournament at the recent national sevens championship in Queenstown. Kiwi Fern national women's rugby league player Honey Hireme had also impressed at Queenstown and joined the team as a debutante. The team which assembled in Mt Maunganui ahead of travelling to the United States, consisted of: Shakira Baker, Kelly Brazier, Kendra Cocksedge, Sarah Goss, Linda Itunu, Honey Hireme, Carla Hohepa, Halie Hurring, Huriana Manuel (captain), Kayla McAlister, Selica Winiata and Portia Woodman. After losing to England in pool play they again lost to them, 19-12 in the semi-finals. They were then beaten by Australia 17-12 during sudden death extra time in the third-place playoff, to finish the tournament in fourth place. A possible contributing factor to their poor performance was that the entire team was effected by an infection that caused vomiting and diarrhoea.

Following Houston 26 players were selected in late February 2013 for a core high performance squad which it was intended would form the basis of New Zealand's attempts to win both that year's Rugby World Cup Sevens but also the Olympics in 2016. The squad included existing fifteen-a-side Black Ferns Shakira Baker, Kelly Brazier, Carla Hohepa, Hailie Hurring, Linda Itunu, Huriana Manuel, Hazel Tubic, Renee Wickliffe and Selica Winiata. Hohepa, Itunu, Manuel, Wickliffe and Winiata also bought sevens experience as they had all played in the 2009 Rugby Sevens World Cup. Looking three years ahead to the Olympics, 16-year-olds Gayle Broughton, Michaela Blyde, Ariana Hira-Herangi and 17-year-olds Hayley Hutana and Shiray Kaka (nee Tane) were also included. The full squad consisted of Shakira Baker, Olivia Bird, Michaela Blyde, Kelly Brazier, Gayle Broughton, Lauren Burgess, Francea Hansen, Ariana Hira-Herangi, Honey Hireme, Sarah Hirini, Halie Hurring, Hayley Hutana, Carla Hohepa, Linda Itunu, Shiray Kaka, Huriana Manuel, Kayla McAlister, Tyla Nathan-Wong, Amanda Rasch, Kristina Sue, Alexis Tapsell, Hazel Tubic, Ruby Tui, Renee Wickliffe, Selica Winiata, and Portia Woodman. Later that same month the squad attended a weekend long boot camp at Waiouru Military Camp which included a morning when they were woken at 6.30am and sent over the assault course, with another day devoted to fitness testing and finally a day of individual development including tactics, leadership and nutrition.

The team for the third tournament of the series which was held at Guangzhou on 30 and 31 March 2013 had two debutantes in the form of Olivia Bird and Kristina Sue. It also saw the return of Tyla Nathan-Wong and Ruby Tui, who had not participated in the Houston event. The team consisted of Shakira Baker, Olivia Bird, Kelly Brazier, Sarah Hirini, Honey Hireme, Linda Itunu, Huriana Manuel (captain), Kayla McAlister, Tyla Nathan-Wong, Kristina Sue, Ruby Tui and Portia Woodman. In pool play New Zealand defeated Brazil 29–0, Tunisia 53–0 and Netherlands 20–5 before in the quarter-final defeating Ireland 31-5 and then in the semi-finals the United States 24-12. They then reveneged their loss to England at Houston by defeating them 19-5 in the final due to a try from Ruby Tui and two from Kelly Brazier.

In pool play at the final tournament of the season which was held in Amsterdam on 17–18 May 2013 New Zealand defeated Russia 17-5, China 24-0 and the Netherlands 15-0. In the quarter-finals they defeated Spain 14-5 and then in the semi-finals Russia 24-10. In the final they triumphed over Canada 33-24 to claim both the tournament and the inaugural World Series title. They finished the Series with 74 points, ahead of England (60), Canada (52), and the United States (48) with Portia Woodman the season's top points (105) and try (21) scorer.

Because of the team's potential to win gold at the Olympics, High Performance Sport New Zealand in 2013 provided funding of $800,000, which was increased to $900,000 in 2014.

=== 2013 World Cup ===
To complete in what would be the national team's first World Cup which was held in Moscow on 29 and 30 June 2013 a largely experienced team with just one change from that which had won in Amsterdam was selected. With Shakira Baker, Carla Hohepa and Ruby Tui unavailable due to injury, Selica Winiata who had returned from an injury rejoined the team, while Vaine Greig and Alexis Tapsell who had only made their debuts at Amsterdam retained their places. The team consisted of Kelly Brazier, Sarah Hirini, Vaine Greig, Honey Hireme, Linda Itunu, Huriana Manuel (captain), Kayla McAlister, Tyla Nathan-Wong, Alexis Tapsell, Selica Winiata, Renee Wickliffe and Portia Woodman.

In pool play New Zealand defeated Tunisia 36-0, the Netherlands 41-0 and Canada 40-5 to finish top of their pool. They then defeated England 24-7 in the quarter-finals and the United States 19-10 in the semi-finals. In front of a very small crowd in a rain soaked final they defeated Canada 29-12, thanks to two tries from Portia Woodman and one each from Kelly Brazier, Honey Hireme and Kayla McAlister. The team ended the competition with 169 points, followed by Australia on 111 and Canada on 102. The triumph in Moscow meant that New Zealand now held the men's and women's World Cups in both fifteen-a-aside and sevens, as well as both the men's and women's sevens world series titles.

=== 2013 Oceania Sevens Championship ===
New Zealand sent a team containing only five players from that which had won the 2013 World Cup to the 2013 Oceania Women's Sevens Championship which was held in Noosa in October 2013. The team consisted of Michaela Blyde, Sarah Hirini (captain), Honey Hireme, Halie Hurring, Hayley Hutana, Shiray Kaka, Crystal Mayes, Tyla Nathan-Wong, Kristina Sue, Alexis Tapsell, Hazel Tubic and Selica Winiata. Being 17 years old, Blyde and Hutana had to be given special dispensation to play in the tournament. They came third, behind Australia and Fiji, with Michaela Blyde scoring five tries in the playoff for third against Samoa.

=== 2013–2014 Sevens Series season ===
The 2013–2014 season commenced with a loss to Australia in the final of the Dubai Sevens on 28–29 November 2013.

In January 2014 contracts were awarded with at least four "tier one" players getting NZ$30,000, at least four "tier two" players getting NZ$25,000 and the remaining contracted players NZ$15,000 to NZ$20,000. The 19 contacted players were Shakira Baker, Michaela Blyde, Kelly Brazier, Gayle Broughton, Sarah Hirini, Vaine Greig, Honey Hireme, Carla Hohepa, Hayley Hutana, Linda Itunu, Shiray Kika, Kayla McAlister, Huriana Manuel, Tyla Nathan-Wong, Alexis Tapsell, Hazel Tubic, Ruby Tui, Selica Winiata and Portia Woodman. While the amounts were not sufficient to allow a full-time commitment, the contracts allowed players the option to work and train part-time. As a result, most of the players had to take paid jobs, which they had to balance with training, overseas travel and often family commitments.

By 2014 the squad still under the overall direction of head coach Sean Horan had consolidated around two hubs, one at Auckland under Allan Bunting and the other at Mount Maunganui under Cory Sweeney. A few players were located in the Waikato.

Returning to the series following the Christmas break the team won in Atlanta on 15–16 February 2014, followed by a runner up in São Paulo before the squad won in Guangzhou. The season came down to the wire at the last tournament which was held at Amsterdam on 16–17 May 2014, as New Zealand was only two points ahead of Australia going into it. The team was strengthened by the inclusion of Kelly Brazier for the first time this season following her recovery from a hip issue. As Baker, Greig, Tubic and Tui were unavailable due to injury and Honey Hireme is absent for family reasons Chelsea Simple (nee Alley) made her debut for the team. The full team consisted of Kelly Brazier, Gayle Broughton, Sarah Hirini, Carla Hohepa, Linda Itunu, Kayla McAlister, Huriana Manuel, Tyla Nathan-Wong, Chelsea Semple, Jordon Webber, Katarina Whata-Simpkins, Portia Woodman with Shiray Kaka the travelling reserve to provide cover for Broughton if she was unable to recover from a hamstring issue in time. After defeating Russia 36-0 in the quarter-finals, and England 26-10 in the semi-final New Zealand won the tournament after defeating Australia 29-12 in the final and secured the series win ending it with 96 points, four ahead of Australia.

In a warm up to the upcoming sevens season the team won the 2014 Oceania Women's Sevens Championship held in Noosa in October 2014, defeating Australia 31–10 in the final.

=== 2014–2015 Sevens Series season ===
The 2014-15 season commenced with two wins in a row, at Dubai and São Paulo.

For the Atlanta tournament which was held on 14-15 March 2015 the team featured four changes from the previous tournament, highlighted by the return of Honey Hireme after a 10-month absence and Alexis Tapsell, while Morgan Morrow and Michaela Blyde were back from injury. The full team consisted of Michaela Blyde, Kelly Brazier, Honey Hireme, Sarah Hirini (captain), Kayla McAlister, Morgan Morrow, Tyla Nathan-Wong, Charlotte Scanlan, Alexis Tapsell, Hazel Tubic, Selica Winiata and Portia Woodman. The team defeated the United States in the final 50-12 to win the tournament.

They followed this up with another tournament win at Langford in Canada before at London they suffered a shock loss to Spain in pool play and they eventually finished fourth. At Amsterdam they lost to the United States team in group play and then lost their quarter final game with England. Their early wins however allowed them to retain the series title and with it gain automatic qualification to the 2016 Summer Olympics in Rio de Janeiro.

After Huriana Manuel suffered a serious ankle injury at the 2014 Fifteen-a-side World Cup, which ruled her out of playing for the Sevens team she was replaced as captain by Sarah Hirini.

In January 2015 the following players were contracted for the next 12 months: Michaela Blyde, Kelly Brazier, Gayle Broughton, Sarah Goss, Honey Hireme, Carla Hohepa, Huriana Manuel, Shiray Kaka, Kayla McAlister, Morgan Morrow, Tyla Nathan-Wong, Charlotte Scanlan, Alexis Tapsell, Hazel Tubic, Ruby Tui, Jordon Webber, Katarina Whata-Simpkins, Selica Winiata, Portia Woodman. The list was notable for the return of Hireme after she had taken a break in 2014 to play for the New Zealand fifteen-a-side team and McAlister who had been not available since mid-2014 due to injury.

=== 2015–2016 Sevens Series season ===
In 2015 the team attended an intensive physical training camp in high temperatures and humidity in Fiji. This was followed by an even more intensive winter camp in Waiouru designed to push them to their physical limits and overseen by the army. With 5am starts, tasks included trying to erect an army canvas tent in a deep cold pool, having to push army trucks for kilometres and in one remote dissolute location having to dig a hole with their entrenching tool which they then had to sleep overnight. To her horror Carla Hohepa dug into the nest of a large spider.

A New Zealand Women’s Development team competed at the Central Coast Sevens tournament held on 23-25 October 2015 in Kanwal, New South Wales, Australia. They were beaten by the Aussie Pearls 31-14 in the final.

For the 2015–2016 series the players with the assistance of the New Zealand Rugby Players Association were able to get their contracts raised, with NZ$40,000 on offer for the senior players.

By the start of the series other teams were starting to catch up the team. This coupled with the hub system reducing their off-field connection, conflicts over the style of play between Horan and the players unsettled the team and their performances became inconsistent. Rejoining the team was Lavinia Gould following the completion of her two-year drug suspension which had ended in May 2015.

With Lesley Ketu (ankle), Kayla McAlister (foot), Stacey Waaka (shoulder), Charlotte Scanlan (shoulder), Alexis Tapsell (neck) and Selica Winiata (back) not available due to injury the team for the first tournament of the series which was held at Dubai on 3–4 December 2015 consisted of Michaela Blyde, Kelly Brazier, Gayle Broughton, Sarah Hirini (captain), Shiray Kaka (nee Tane), Tyla Nathan-Wong, Ruby Tui, Hazel Tubic, Katarina Whata-Simpkins, Jordon Webber, Niall Williams, Portia Woodman. This tournament marked the debut of Williams. The tournament commenced with them losing Russia 33-7 but two other wins iin pool-play ensured they were able to process to the quarter-finals where they were defeated by Australia 15-12. They finished the tournament in fifth place.

Manuel returned in 2016. They were third at São Paulo. The 14 strong squad for the two North American tournaments consisted of Michaela Blyde, Kelly Brazier, Theresa Fitzpatrick, Sarah Hirini (captain), Tyla Nathan-Wong, Shiray Kaka, Terina Te Tamaki, Ruby Tui, Janna Vaughan, Stacey Waaka, Katarina Whata-Simpkins, Niall Williams, Selica Winiata and Portia Woodman. Kaka and Waaka were returning from injury. Not considered because of injury were Gayle Broughton, Kayla McAlister and Huriana Manuel. Theresa Fitzpatrick had been promoted from the sevens development squad. At the Atlanta tournament which was held on 8-9 April 2016 the team merged from group play with wins over Japan 38-5 and Spain 10-5 before losing to the United States 12-5. This was sufficient to get them through to the quarter-finals where they defeated France 24-7 and them England 24-19 in the semi-finals. They were defeated 24-19 in the final by Australia. They were also runners up Langford due to a loss to England in the final. They were third at Clermont-Ferrand, which meant that Australia won the series title. New Zealand was runner up despite not winning a single tournament. Across the entire season New Zealand scored an average of 24.5 points per game and conceded an average of 10.2 points. They also had the best try-scoring rate, scoring a try every 57 seconds of their own possession, compared with an average of 87 seconds.

In January 2016 a squad of 22 was announced, consisting of Shakira Baker, Michaela Blyde, Kelly Brazier, Gayle Broughton, Sarah Hirini, Honey Hireme, Carla Hohepa, Lesley Ketu, Huriana Manuel, Kayla McAlister, Tyla Nathan-Wong, Shiray Kaka (née Tane), Terina Te Tamaki, Hazel Tubic, Ruby Tui, Janna Vaughan, Stacey Waaka, Jordon Webber, Kat Whata-Simpkins, Niall Williams, Selica Winiata and Portia Woodman.

From this squad, it was intended that 12 players would be selected for the New Zealand sevens team to compete at the 2016 Olympic Games.

=== 2016 Rio Olympic Games ===
The New Zealand Women's Rugby Sevens team for the Rio Olympics was: Shakira Baker, Kelly Brazier, Gayle Broughton, Theresa Fitzpatrick, Sarah Hirini (captain), Kayla McAlister, Huriana Manuel, Tyla Nathan-Wong, Terina Te Tamaki, Ruby Tui, Niall Williams, Portia Woodman with the travelling reserves being Michaela Blyde and Shiray Tane.

Broughton ruptured her anterior cruciate ligament (ACL) at the São Paulo tournament in February 2016 and after opting for a non-surgical treatment played at Rio without ligaments in the effected knee. Prior to the commencement of the games in order to assist the players in adjusting to the heat of Brazil they had a training camp in Tampa, Florida.

The team scored 109 points and conceded 12 in pool play before beating the US in the quarter-finals, Great Britain in the semi-finals, but lost 24–17 to Australia in the final. The loss hit the squad hard.

Following Rio Sean Horan resigned as coach. Allan Bunting and Cory Sweeney both applied for the head coaching position, agreeing that regardless of who got the job, the other would serve as others assistant. In early November 2016 Bunting was appointed as the new head coach with Sweeney as his assistant, while Stu Ross accepted the position of analyst and set-piece coach.

There were changes among the players with Huriana Manuel retiring and Kayla McAlister each taking a year away from the game in order to have a child.

Bunting and Sweeney decided to play games using a player lead approach that used space and relentless attack, even from while on defense, a style that they came to term "Kokirikiri". Hirini remained captain and to support her the coaches encouraged other senior players to take on various roles. Once the coaches had set the overall approach for a game Kelly Brazier and Tyla Nathan-Wong would led general performance preparation and direct on field set plays, especially on attack. Tui and Williams took on the responsibility for the team's off field culture and in defense on field. Waaka and Woodman took responsibility for the squad's Māori culture. As the team culture developed Māori culture and language began to become more and more integrated into the team. With half the team of Samoan descent, there is a strong Samoan influence as well. Waaka created a team song by writing lyrics to "Te Kapa Rapango Takiwhitu" in English which her cousin translated into Māori.

=== 2016–2017 Sevens Series season ===
The first chance to try the new approach was at Dubai in December 2016 which gave the chance to debut the teenage Tenika Williams and give fringe players Rebekah Tufuga-Corden, Katarina Whata-Simpkins and Jordan Webber a run. With no losses they won their first tournament in more than a year despite being reduced by injuries having only 10 players available for the final. Dubai was the last tournament at which a team member was used to bring water to the on field players after it was observed that the exuberant "chatter" from an injured Niall Williams who was on water-duty ran the risk of giving away too much information to their Australian rivals.

Following on from the success of the 2012 "Go For Gold" talent identification programme, New Zealand Rugby held 18 trials in February 2017 throughout New Zealand to identify potential athletes for the 2020 Tokyo Olympics.

In January 2017 a squad of 20 was selected, with 18 on full contracts and two on training contracts. With Kayla McAlister pregnant and Huriana Manuel having retired the squad consisted of Sarah Hirini (captain), Shakira Baker, Michaela Blyde, Kelly Brazier, Gayle Broughton, Rebekah Cordero-Tufuga, Lyric Faleafaga (training contract), Theresa Fitzpatrick, Crystal Mayes (training contract), Tyla Nathan-Wong, Cheyelle Robins-Reti, Alena Saili, Terina Te Tamaki, Ruby Tui, Stacey Waaka, Katarina Whata-Simpkins, Renee Wickliffe, Niall Williams, Tenika Willison and Portia Woodman.

The latter half of the season was disrupted when a number of players including Kelly Brazier, Theresa Fitzpatrick, Sarah Hirini and Portia Woodman were recruited for the Black Ferns fifteen-a-side team to compete in that team's ultimately successful 2017 Women's Rugby World Cup campaign in August of that year. Despite the loss of some of their best-known players the rest of the Sevens team won in Canada in May, then in France in June and thus ensured that the team won the World Series with 118 points compared to the next closest team which was Australia with 108 points.

=== 2017–2018 Sevens Series season ===
The 2017–18 World Rugby Women's Sevens Series didn't get off to the best start when at Dubai New Zealand was beaten 14–12 by the US in the quarter-finals, despite having beaten them 45–14 in pool play. This was Kayla McAlister's first tournament after returning from maternity leave. In the final of the Sydney Sevens in January 2018 the Black Ferns Sevens were well beaten 31-nil by Australia.

In early 2018 the following 23 players were awarded contracts covering the next 12 months, Shakira Baker, Michaela Blyde, Kelly Brazier, Gayle Broughton, Lyric Faleafaga (who graduated from a training to a full contract), Rhiarna Ferris (who was new to the squad), Theresa Fitzpatrick, Stacey Waaka, Sarah Hirini, Huia Harding (who was new to the squad), Jazmin Felix-Hotham (training contract), Shiray Kaka, Natahlia Moors (training contract), Tyla Nathan-Wong, Risi Pouri-Lane (who was new to the squad), Leanna Ryan (training contract), Alena Saili, Terina Te Tamaki, Ruby Tui, Kat Whata-Simpkins, Niall Williams, Tenika Willison and Portia Woodman.

In 2018 it was decided to centralise as much of the men's and women's Sevens program at a single location, taking into consideration a climate that allowed maximizing of training time, availability of affordable housing and a facility with a playing field that provided office space, meeting rooms a gymnasium and a recovery area. The University of Waikato Adams Centre for High Performance at Mount Maunganui was selected as the best option and the two teams officially moved in on 1 October 2018.

A unique aspect to the 2017-18 season was the scheduling of the 2018 Commonwealth Games between the Sydney and Kitakyushu tournaments. This was the first time that Women's Rugby Sevens was played at the Commonwealth Games after the sport was introduced to the programme in 1998. After a detailed analysis of what had gone wrong at Dubai and Sydney the New Zealanders spent the three months following Sydney in a fitness training regime designed to allow them to play for a third half.

Following the conclusion of the Commonwealth Games the New Zealanders returned to the uncompleted 2017–2018 sevens season, winning the remaining tournaments at Kitakyushu, Langford and Paris. At Langford they recorded their largest-ever victory over Australia in a 46-0 victory in the final. It was their fourth-largest victory out of their 30 matches in 2017-18. However these tournament victories were insufficient too overcome the deficit caused by a quarter-final loss at Dubai and a second place at Sydney. As a result Australia claimed the season title with 92 points compared to New Zealand's 90.

Across the entire season New Zealand scored an average of 31.5 points per game and conceded an average of 6.5 points. They also had the best try-scoring rate, scoring a try every 47 seconds of their own possession, compared with an average of 78 seconds.

=== 2018 Gold Coast Commonwealth Games ===
The original team announced on 21 March 2018 to compete in the 2018 Gold Coast Commonwealth Games was Shakira Baker, Michaela Blyde, Kelly Brazier, Gayle Broughton, Theresa Fitzpatrick, Sarah Hirini, Tyla Nathan-Wong, Ruby Tui, Stacey Waaka, Kat Whata-Simpkins, Niall Williams, and Portia Woodman with Tenika Willison as the travelling reserve. Just prior to departure for their Commonwealth Games pre-camp on the Sunshine Coast Kat Whata-Simpkins suffered a hamstring injury, which resulted first in 18 year old Risi Pouri-Lane being added to the travelling team and when it was confirmed that Kat would not recover in time Tenika Willison was promoted to the initial 12. Alena Saili was made a travelling reserve or 13th player with 17-year-old Pouri-Lane staying on as another reserve. Upon arriving in Australia the team spent 10 days on Sunshine Coast cclimatizing before the state of the games. Ruby Tui then caught mumps, whose highly contagious nature meant that the whole team had to go into a day and a half of isolation at their Sunshine Coast accommodation before travelling to the Gold Coast where as a further health precaution they were accommodated in a set of apartments, complete with their own chef from Tauranga rather than in the athletes' village.

The competition at the Gold Coast Commonwealth Games which was held on 13 and 15 April 2018 was shorter than normal as there were only eight teams organized into two pools, with the top two teams going forward from each pool to the semi-finals. In pool play New Zealand defeated Kenya 45-0, South Africa 41-0 and Canada 24–7 before overcoming England 26-5 in the semi-final.

In the warm-up to the final against Australia Broughton's knee accidentally hit Blyde, just above her eye which caused blood to flow from her eyebrow, while within minutes Tyla Nathan-Wong had to be sent to hospital after her neck was injured after accidentally collided with Stacey Waaka's backside. Willison was promoted to the starting lineup as halfback and Pouri-Lane was promoted to the playing 12. These issues delayed the start of the game by five minutes. With the score locked at 12-12 at full-time the final went into extra-time where six minutes and 21 seconds had passed before Kelly Brazier broke the deadlock with an 80 metres runaway try that won the game for New Zealand 17-12, and effort which left her totally exhausted on the ground. On the way to the hospital Nathan-Wong was relayed the game's result by an ambulance officer, being told it had gone to overtime, and upon hearing the final results burst out crying.

=== 2018 World Cup ===
On 20–21 July 2018 the team competed in the 2018 Women's Rugby Sevens World Cup in San Francisco. This was the first time that both the men's and men's tournament had been held together. The team progressed through the first two rounds without conceding a point first beating Mexico 57-0 and then Ireland 45-0. The semi-final was a hard fought affair against a United States team who had the advantage of a home crowd, but New Zealand eventually prevailed 26-21. In front of a 38,000 strong crowd they enjoyed a comprehensive 29-0 win against France in the final to become women's champion. In addition to scoring three tries in the final Michaela Blyde scored the most tries (nine) and the most points in the competition.

The team won the Team of the Year award for 2018 at the Halberg Awards.

=== 2018–2019 Sevens Series season ===
New Zealand commenced the 2018–19 World Rugby Women's Sevens Series season with tournament wins at Glendale in Colorado, Dubai and Sydney ended their 37-game winning streak with a 17-all draw to Russia in pool play at Kitakyusha, then in pool play they suffered their first ever loss to France, before being beaten in the quarter-final by USA to finish fifth. The team had commenced the tournament with their coach Bunting on personal leave, Woodman out since October 2018 with a long term Achilles tendon injury, while the central experienced core of the team was decimated by Fitzpatrick, Blyde, Brazier and Broughton not being available, further compounded by Waaka becoming injured partway through the tournament. The team rebounded to win the tournament in Canada, before at Biarratz being beaten in the final of the season's last tournament. However they still had accumulated enough points to win the series, while Sarah Hirini became the first woman to play in 200 World Series games.

Across the entire season New Zealand scored an average of 28 points per game and conceded an average of 10 points. They shared the best try-scoring rate with Australia, scoring a try every 60 seconds of their own possession, vis an average of 71 seconds.

=== 2019–2020 Sevens Series season ===
In January 2019 21 players were awarded contracts, Shakira Baker, Michaela Blyde, Kelly Brazier, Gayle Broughton, Rhiarna Ferris, Theresa Fitzpatrick, Huia Harding, Sarah Hirini, Jazmin Hotham, Tyla Nathan-Wong, Mahina Paul, Risi Pouri-Lane, Alena Saili, Montessa Tairakena, Terina Te Tamaki, Ruby Tui, Stacey Waaka, Kat Whata-Simpkins, Niall Williams, Tenika Willison and Portia Woodman. Previously involved in the Youth Olympic Games and having completed their high school education Jazmin Hotham, Montessa Tairakena and Mahina Paul were able to promoted to full time contracts.

Early in 2019 a development squad coached by Jimmy Sinclair and Victoria Grant played five games across two days against a Japanese women team before participating in an invitational tournament in Auckland in March of that year. The squad consisted of Kendall Buckingham, Amy du Plessis, Dhys Faleafaga, Tynealle Fitzgerald, Tysha Ikenasio, Crystal Mayes, Isla Norman-Bell, Rina Paraone, Mererangi Paul, Cheyelle Robins-Reti, Kennedy Simon, Grace Steinmetz, Kiki Tahere and Kalyn Takitimu-Cook.

In September 2019 Allan Bunting and Cory Sweeney were appointed co-coaches through to the Tokyo Olympics with Stu Ross continuing as assistant coach (a role he had held since July 2019). They were supported by a physio, strength and conditioning coach, manager and other staff to oversee the contracted players’ nutrition, development and psychology.

The five tournament 2019–2020 season began with a third place at Glendale. This was followed by winning the Dubai tournament at which Shakira Baker unfortunately ruptured her ACL in the final. She was eventually not able to recover in time to be considered for Tokyo. The team continued their winning ways with triumphs at Cape Town, Hamilton and Sydney, to emerge season champions. Across the entire season they lost only two matches, a pool match in Dubai and the semi-final at Glendale. With Woodman still out of commission Waaka filled her shoes to become the series dominant try scorer.

Across the entire season New Zealand scored an average of 28 points per game and conceded an average of 9.1 points. They also had the best try-scoring rate, scoring a try every 57 seconds of their own possession, compared with an average of 76 seconds.

In February 2020 New Zealand Rugby announced which players had been contracted for the next 12 months, with the expectation that a team would be selected from them to contest the upcoming Olympics. The contracted players were: Shakira Baker, Micheala Blyde, Kelly Brazier, Gayle Broughton, Dhys Faleafaga, Theresa Fitzpatrick, Sarah Hirini, Jazmin Hotham, Shiray Kaka, Kayla McAlister (returning from living in France), Tyla Nathan-Wong, Mahina Paul, Risi Pouri-Lane, Cheyelle Robins, Alena Saiili, Montessa Tairakena, Terina Te Tamaki, Ruby Tui, Niall Williams, Tenika Willison, Stacey Waaka and Portia Woodman.

The onset of the COVID-19 pandemic resulted in the remainder of the 2019–2020 season being cancelled. As New Zealand was leading the competition with 783 points scored they were awarded the 2020 series title.

=== COVID ===
Due to the international Sevens competition being put on hold the support personnel at the performance base at Mount Manganui was reduced in number with some remaining but on reduced hours. To further reduce expeniture New Zealand Rugby and the New Zealand Rugby Player's Association agreed in April 2020 that from 1 May that along with suspensions of various allowances and other financial benefits thzt the players' 2020 base retainers would be reduced by 15 percent for those paid more than NZ$50,000 per year, with this rising to 30 percent in September. The men and women players were also organized into a single combined training group in order to form a nucleus of sevens squad overseen by Sweeney, men's coach Clark Laidlaw and men's strength and conditioning coach Blair Mills. Allan Bunting, who had previous been commuting from Auckland stayed in there. The combining of the two teams had the benefit of exposing the respective sexes to different ways of doing things.

After the initial lockdown life within New Zealand returned to a relative normal in late 2020 as the squad reformed and ways were found to prepare for the Tokyo games were had been rescheduled for 2021. Among them were games against a Moana Pasifika team and a team sourced from members of the Black Ferns fifteen-a-side squad in a mini tournament in Wellington which was termed Pure Sevens.

=== Ignite7 2020 ===
During 2020 New Zealand Rugby held the fourth iteration of Ignite7, a programme to identify the next generation of women players with applicants invited from a wide range of sports. The programme cumulated in a two-day tournament held at Blake Park, in Tauranga over the weekend of 5–6 December 202O which mixed identified promising new talent with existing international players.

The attending 48 players were divided into four teams, as follows:

- Team Bolt which contained Sam Curtis, Dhys Faleafaga, Jorja Miller, Rhiarna Feris, Cheyelle Robins-Reti, Leanna Ryan, Teuila Sotutu, Montessa Tairakena, Kalyn Takitimu-Cook, Hazel Tubic, Ruby Tui (co-captain), Lavinia Tauhalaliku and Stacey Waaka (co-captain).
- Team Inferno which contained Mia Anderson, Gayle Broughton, Tiana Davidson, Lyric Faleafaga, Theresa Fitzpatrick (co-captain), Tynealle Fitzgerald, Tysha Ikenasio, Rosie Kelly, Tyla Nathan-Wong (co-captain), Ruby Tawa, Kelsey Teneti, Terina Te Tamaki, Leianne Tufuga and Tenika Willison.
- Team Power which contained Michaela Blyde, Princess Elliott Sarah Hirini, Crystal Mayes, Manaia Nuku, Mahina Paul, Risi Pouri-Lane, Layla Sae, Kiki Tahere, Alanis Toia-Tigatua, Rebekah Tufaga, Janna Vaughan and Olive Watherstone.
- Team Surge which contained Kelly Brazier, Jazmin Felix-Hotham, Iritana Hohaia, Maia Joseph, Grace Kukutai, Shiray Kaka, Keila Pouri-LaneIsla Norman-Bell, Mererangi Paul Alena Saili, Autumn-Rain Stephens-Daly, Shyanna Thompson, and Portia Woodman.

=== International play resumes ===
The opening of the trans-Tasman bubble in May 2021 allowed the playing of six games against Australia at the Orākei Domain in Auckland which was organized to provide two games per day. The Black Sevens won the series 5–1 with Woodman back in top form. In an effort to replicate playing against team like the USA which had size and speed the team in the first half of 2021 played the Hamilton Boys High School. This school had won the Condor Sevens national school competition sevens times in a row. While rucks were contested it not being a full tackle game, but this didn't prevent Alena Saili fracturing one of her shoulders.

In June 2021 New Zealand participated in the 2021 Oceania Women's Sevens Championship in Townsville against Australia, Fiji and the Oceania Barbarians. New Zealand won the tournament. This was the final playing chance for players to gain selection before the team would be trimmed to 16 for Tokyo. Kelly Brazier attended the tournament but was unable to play due to flu. She then had a hamstring injury, which put her in doubt for Tokyo. While she wasn't back to 100% by the end of the tournament she was selected.

=== 2020 Tokyo Olympic Games ===
The New Zealand Women's Rugby Sevens team for the Tokyo Olympics was: Michaela Blyde, Kelly Brazier, Gayle Broughton, Theresa Fitzpatrick, Sarah Hirini (captain), Shiray Kaka, Tyla Nathan-Wong, Risi Pouri-Lane, Alena Saili, Ruby Tui, Stacey Waaka and Portia Woodman. The travelling reserves were Jazmin Hotham, Terina Te Tamaki and Tenika Willison (who was the designated 13th team member), while the non-travelling reserves were Shakira Baker, Dhys Faleafaga, Manaia Nuku, Mahina Paul and Cheyelle Robins-Reti. Michaela Blyde and Shiray Kaka had both been reserves at Rio. Normally while all 13 members of a team travel to a tournament only members of the final named 12 are allowed to play, but because of COVID the rules at Tokyo allowed any of the officially named 13 to play, with all of them receiving a medal if the team won one. Willison ended up playing in the game against Great Britain and Russia, in place of Brazier and Blyde, respectively. Due to COVID restrictions Jazmin Hotham and Terina Te Tamaki as travelling reserves who didn't make the 13 were not allowed to stay in the Olympic Village and were instead accommodated in a hotel, from where they had to watch the team's games on the television.

Sarah Hirini was selected to join Hamish Bond in being New Zealand's flagbearers at the opening ceremony in Tokyo. Due to a racing the next day Bond was replaced by David Nyika. Due to COVID restrictions on how many could enter the Olympic Village at a time eleven of the players and management including Hirini were due to fly from Townsville in order to ensure Hirini would be able to attend the opening ceremony. They would be joined later by the rest of the team. After their first flight was cancelled the eleven missed their connection in Brisbane, which led to their 24-hour pre-departure tests expiring. Eventually a way was found of getting Hirini accompanied by Woodman to Tokyo in time to participate in the opening ceremony.

In their first game of pool play New Zealand defeated Kenya 29-7. In their next pool game Great Britain raced to a 21-nil lead before being overhauled and defeated 26–21. The New Zealanders then overwhelmed Russia 33-0 and then defeated them again in the quarter-final 36–0.

In the semi-final the Black Ferns were faced by a much improved Fiji, who up until that time had never beaten New Zealand. Within 90 seconds Broughton scored for New Zealand to give a 5-nil lead. Fiji answered with a try by Vasiti Solikoviti to lead 7–5 at half-time. Resumption of the game after half-time saw Solikoviti score another try to increase the lead to 12–5. Nathan-Wong then equalized with a try under the goal posts. Waaka scored what was an unconverted try before Fiji scored in the corner to equalize, but Viniana Riwai was unable to convert the try. With the score drawn at 17-all the game was forced into extra time, during which Broughton who had been bought back onto the field to replace Brazier scored the winning try. The final score in favour of the Black Ferns was 22–17.

The team then defeated France in the final 26–12 to claim the gold medal after leading 19–5 at halftime. Across the entire event New Zealand scored the most points, 172 at an average of 28.7 points per game and conceded only 57 points. They shared the best try-scoring rate with France, scoring a try every 51 seconds of their own possession, compared with an average of 76 seconds. They also conceded the least penalties.

Upon their return to New Zealand the entire team isolated for 14 days in a managed isolation and quarantine (MIQ) facility before being released into the general population.

=== 2021–22 Sevens Series season ===
New Zealand's participation in the 2021-22 season was disrupted by the team missing the first four tournaments due to travel logistics and travel-related restrictions imposed by the COVID-19 pandemic.

The team returned to the season with Cory Sweeney continuing as head coach, Stu Ross and Ed Cocker as assistant coaches and Crystal Kaua as skills coach/performance analyst. The absence of New Zealand for two-thirds of the season allowed Australia to dominate, winning four of the six tournament and thus the season title. New Zealand won only the last tournament of the season.

In June 2022 New Zealand hosted and won the 2022 Pacific Four Series.

=== 2022 Birmingham Commonwealth Games ===
In June 2022 the team was announced to represent New Zealand in the rugby sevens tournament at the 2022 Commonwealth Games. It consisted of Michaela Blyde, Kelly Brazier, Theresa Fitzpatrick, Sarah Hirini [captain], Jazmin Felix-Hotham, Shiray Kaka, Tyla Nathan-Wong, Risi Pouri-Lane, Alena Saili, Stacey Waaka, Niall Williams, Tenika Willison and Portia Woodman. The travelling reserves were Terina Te Tamaki and Mahina Paul, while the non-travelling reserves were Shakira Baker, Tysha Ikenasio, Manaia Nuku and Ruby Tui. Eleven of the players had been members of the team that had participated in the Gold Coast Commonwealth Games.

Prior to the commencement of the games the team attended a training camp in Scotland.

After topping their pool unbeaten, the team lost their semi-final match against Australia 12-17 and eventually won the bronze medal in the playoff against Canada for third, 19–12.

=== 2022 World Cup ===
With Shakira Baker, Tysha Ikenasio and Tyla Nathan-Wong unavailable due to injury the team for the 2022 World Cup held in Cape Town in September 2022 was Michaela Blyde, Kelly Brazier, Sarah Hirini (captain), Jazmin Felix-Hotham, Shiray Kaka, Jorja Miller, Risi Pouri-Lane, Alena Saili, Stacey Waaka, Niall Williams, Tenika Willison and Portia Woodman. The travelling reserves were Manaia Nuku and Mahina Paul. Miller was making her debut for the team. The team lost in the final to arch-rivals Australia, 22–24, which allowed them to add the World Cup to their Commonwealth Games and 2021-22 world series titles and thus claim a rare Triple Crown.

=== 2022–2023 Sevens Series season ===
Initially the 2022-23 season commenced with New Zealand (despite three tries from Michaela Blyde) losing to Australia in the final in the season opener in Dubai in early December 2022. This loss could have been explained by the absence of Theresa Fitzpatrick, Sarah Hirini, Ruby Tui, Stacey Waaka and Portia Woodman who were resting after playing for the fifteen-a-side Blacks Ferns team in the World Cup. Under the captaincy of Tyla Nathan-Wong the Dubai tournament witnessed the debuts of Tysha Ikenasio, Kelsey Teneti and Manaia Nuku, with the appearance of Jorja Miller in her first World Series tournament. Other team members were Niall Williams, Michaela Blyde, Kelly Brazier, Jazmin Felix-Hotham, Terina Te Tamaki, Shiray Kaka, Risi Pouri-Lane and Mahina Paul.

Again captained by Tylka Nathan-Wong the same team then turned the tables on Australia by beating them in the final of the next tournament at Cape Town. Up until this point Australia had dominated Sevens in 2022, winning the Commonwealth Games, World Cup and the Dubai tournament.

The third tournament in the series, was held in Hamilton, New Zealand on 21–22 January 2023 with all of the Black Ferns world cup secondments (with the exception of Ruby Tui) available to booster the team's firepower in front of family and New Zealand supporters. Led by Sarah Hirini the team dominated the competition scoring 213 points while conceding only 19, which included in front of more than 19,000 spectators, the defeat of United States, 33-7 in the final. They continued their winning ways at Sydney and Vancouver, before the sixth tournament of the season which was at Hong Kong on 31 March – 2 April 2023. This was its first appearance on the women's World Series circuit. The team defeated Hong Kong 50-0, Great Britain 43-0 and Canada 46-0 in pool play, Canada again 45-14 in the quarter-final, Fiji 31-5 in the semi-final and Australia 26-17 in the final. Over the course of the tournament the team scored 39 tries and only conceded five. Of these Stacey Waaka scored eight, two of which were in the final, which saw her named player of the final.

Following Hong Kong New Zealand won at Toulouse, defeating United States, 19-14. This was the final tournament of the series, to make six tournament wins out of seven, having won 36 consecutive matches. Toulouse was notable as it marked the final appearance of long term team stalwart Niall Williams, who was retiring from sevens rugby. Michael Blyde was the series second highest try scorer with 43, Stacey Waaka fourth equal with 30 and Portia Woodman eighth equal with 24. Tyla Nathan-Wong was the second highest points scorer and Michaela Blyde the third highest.

At the 2023 World Rugby Sevens Series Awards, Jorja Miller was named rookie of the year, while Blyde, Hirini, Nathan-Wong and Waaka were named as members of the 2023 women's dream team.

In recognition of them being crowned the 2022–2023 Sevens champions the team won the team of the year award at New Zealand's 2023 Halberg Awards.

=== 2023 Oceania Sevens Championship ===
As they had already qualified for the 2024 Tokyo Olympics New Zealand elected to send a development team (made up of a mix of contracted and development players) to the 2023 Oceania Women's Sevens Championship held in Queensland from 10 to 12 November 2023. The team consisted of: Reese Anderson, Dhys Faleafaga, Theresa Fitzpatrick (co-captain), Tysha Ikenasio, Shiray Kaka, Jorja Miller, Manaia Nuku, Grace Steinmetz, Kelsey Teneti, Terina Te Tamaki, Olive Watherston, Tenika Willison (co-captain).

To allow other teams from Oceania to qualify for Tokyo New Zealand and Australia (who had already qualified) played each other in a dedicated pool. Of the four games that they played Australia won three, with another being drawn. Australia then prevailed in the playoff-stage which consigned New Zealand to third place following them winning their game against Papua New Guinea, 20–0.

=== 2023–2024 Sevens Series season ===
Compared with previous seasons, this season which was renamed as the World Rugby SVNS Series featured alignment of both the men's and women's calendars with eight tournaments. The top eight placed teams based on cumulative series points at the conclusion of the seventh tournament then competing in a "winner takes all" Grand Final tournament. The season ran from December to early June. For single tournaments the team typically spent 12 days away from New Zealand, while for back to back tournaments they typically spent 2½ weeks away, followed by 1½ weeks back home.

The team announced for the first tournament of the season (held at Dubai from 2–3 December) consisted of Michaela Blyde, Kelly Brazier, Jazmin Felix-Hotham, Sarah Hirini (captain), Shiray Kaka, Jorja Miller, Manaia Nuku, Mahina Paul, Risi Pouri-Lane, Alena Saili, Stacey Waaka, Tenika Willison and Portia Woodman-Wickliffe. Prior to the Dubai tournament the team as per tradition spent time in Abu Dhabi to acclimatize ahead of the Dubai Sevens. Here they participated in the inaugural Abu Dhabi Sevens Festival held in late November 2023, which was also attended by Brazil, Canada and France. Each team at the event played two games, New Zealand beating Brazil 41-0 and then in the final, France 24–12.

Initially the Dubai tournament didn't start well with captain Sarah Hirini having to score a late try in their first game to create a 19-14 winning margin and thus prevent an upset defeat to South Africa. They then overwhelmed Great Britain 43–7 at the expense of Sarah Hirini being ruled out of the rest of the tournament after rupturing the anterior cruciate ligament (ACL) in her right knee during the game. Despite her loss the team went on defeat Fiji 29–21 in the last game of pool play before beating Brazil 26–14 in the quarter-final and then Canada in the semi-final. In the final despite three tries from Jorja Miller, New Zealand was beaten 26–19 by their arch rivals Australia. The tournament was notable for the team's loss in the final bringing an end to their record of 41 consecutive women series wins which had commenced after their loss to Australia in the 2022 Dubai final and for Kelly Brazier scoring her one hundredth try in the quarter-final win over Brazil in Dubai.

At the second tournament of the season held in Cape Town on 9–10 December 2023 the team lost 24–12 in the semi-final to France and finished the tournament in third place after beating the USA 10–9 in the play-off. The tournament was notable for Michaela Blyde becoming the second women to score 200 tries in the HSBC international sevens competition.

After winning all of their pool games at the third tournament of the season, which was held in Perth on 26–28 January 2024, New Zealand was beaten 14–24 by Australia in their quarter-final match and went on to come fifth in the tournament after beating France 10–14.

On 9 February 2024 the squad for the remainder of the 2023–24 season and for the Paris Olympics was announced as Michaela Blyde, Kelly Brazier, Dhys Faleafaga, Jazmin Felix-Hotham, Sarah Hirini, Shiray Kaka, Tyla King (née Nathan-Wong), Tysha Ikenasio, Justine McGregor, Jorja Miller, Manaia Nuku, Mahina Paul, Risi Pouri-Lane, Alena Saili, Theresa Setefano (née Fitzpatrick), Kelsey Teneti, Terina Te Tamaki, Stacey Waaka, Tenika Willison and Portia Woodman-Wickliffe. Notable additions to the squad were the debut of 17 year old Justine McGregor and the return of Dhys Faleafaga following the birth of her twin sons.

At the fourth tournament of the season, which was held in Vancouver on 23–25 February 2024 they emerged from pool play with three consecutive victories, scoring the most tries and conceding the least to give a points difference of +101. They progressed past Spain and Canada to the final where assisted by three tries from Portia Woodman-Wickliffe, they bet France 35–19 to claim their first tournament of the season. Michaela Blyde and Shiray Kaka were selected for the tournaments dream team. The tournament was notable for being the team being the first in sevens series history of either sex to play in fifty semi-finals.

At the fifth tournament of the season, which was held in Los Angeles on 2 and 3 March 2024 New Zealand triumphed over Australia 29–14 in the final assisted by three tries from Michaela Blyde and Australia being reduced for a period to six on the field by the sinbinning of Maddison Levi. The tournament was notable for Portia Woodman-Wickliffe playing her fiftieth international tournament and for Tyla King overtaking Ghislaine Landry during New Zealand's 40–0 win over Brazil to become the highest women points scorer in the history of the sevens series. Blyde scored a total of 12 tries over the course of the tournament and together with Jorja Miller and Woodman-Wickliffe was selected for the tournaments dream team.

At the sixth tournament of the season, which was held in Hong Kong on 5–7 April 2024 New Zealand triumphed over United States 36–7 in the lopsided final assisted by three tries from Michaela Blyde. The tournament was notable for Blyde playing her fiftieth international tournament. New Zealand's path to the final was notable for them receiving their first pool stage defeat of the 2023–24 season when they were beaten 26–21 by France.

Despite Sarah Hirini and Kelly Brazier still being unavailable due to injury New Zealand won all their matches at the seventh tournament of the season, which was held in Singapore on 3–5 May 2024. Despite Tyla King (née Nathan-Wong) and Shiray Kaka becoming unavailable following injuries in the quarter-final against Great Britain, the team still had the depth to triumph in the final over Australia 31–21, assisted by three tries from Michaela Blyde. This allowed Blyde to increase her score of three tries in a world series final to six. Jorja Miller was named player of the final. The tournament was notable for Portia Woodman-Wickliffe scoring her 250th try during the game against Ireland, plus she also scored a try in the final, bringing her up to a record 36 tries in Sevens finals, ahead of Blyde with 32 and Charlotte Caslick next with 13. The points gained at Singapore allowed New Zealand to claim the Sevens league title for 2023–24 with 126 points from 36 wins (assisted by 192 tries) compared with Australia's 124 points from 34 wins (assisted by 185 tries).

At the season's grand final held in Madrid on 31 May–2 June 2024, New Zealand lost to Canada in pool play but wins against Great Britain and the USA were sufficient to allow them to progress to the semi-finals where they lost during the last minute to Australia, 19–21. In the playoff for third they beat Canada 26-14 and thus avoided this tournament being the first time that they would have lost three games at a tournament since Houston 2013. The tournament was notable for Stacey Waaka scoring her one hundredth try in the Sevens Series during the game against Great Britain.

=== 2024 Paris Olympic Games ===
The New Zealand Women's Rugby Sevens team for the Paris Olympics was announced on 20 June 2024 and consisted of: Michaela Blyde, Jazmin Felix-Hotham, Theresa Fitzpatrick, Sarah Hirini, Tyla Nathan-Wong, Jorja Miller, Manaia Nuku, Mahina Paul, Risi Pouri-Lane, Alena Saili, Stacey Waaka and Portia Woodman-Wickliffe with the travelling reserves being Tyhsa Ikenasio, Kelsey Teneti and Tenika Willison. Kelly Brazier, Dhys Faleafaga, Justine McGregor and Terina Te Tamaki were selected as non-travelling reserves. Hirini and Pouri-Lane were later named as co-captains.

Prior to the event the team attended a pre-Olympic camp from 2 to 22 July 2024 in the village of Soustons in southwestern France where as part of their preparation they played practice games against the Japanese team.

The team went undefeated in pool play beating China 43–5, Canada 33-7 and Fiji 38–7, before defeating China 55–5 in the quarter-final and the USA 24–12 in the semi-final. In the final the team defeated Canada 19–12 to win back-to back gold medals. The win improved their winning record to 17–1 over three Olympics, with a record total of 212 points scored. With 10 tries, Michaela Blyde was the team's top try scorer, followed by Stacey Waaka with seven. Theresa Fitzpatrick, Sarah Hirini, Tyla Nathan-Wong and Portia Woodman joined a select group of 16 other New Zealanders who have won three or more Olympic medals. The team had to leave their accommodation in the Olympic village within days of winning the gold medal in order to make way for New Zealanders arriving to take participate in completions in the latter stages of the Olympics. While some stayed on in Europe a number headed home either due to homesickness or to meet commitments to play rugby league in Australia. The competition was the final appearance of long-term stalwarts Tyla Nathan-Wong and Portia Woodman who were retiring from playing international rugby sevens.

=== 2024–2025 Sevens Series season ===
In October 2024 New Zealand Rugby announced that the following 17 players had been contacted for 2025: Michaela Blyde, Kelly Brazier, Maia Davis, Dhys Faleafaga, Jazmin Felix-Hotham, Theresa Fitzpatrick, Sarah Hirini, Shiray Kaka, Le Oxeayn Maiu'u, Justine McGregor, Jorja Miller, Manaia Nuku, Mahina Paul, Risi Pouri-Lane, Alena Saili, Kelsey Teneti and Stacey Waaka. New to the team were Maia Davis and Le Oxeayn Maiu'u. There was also the potential to add another three fully contracted players, with another five development contracts on offer.

On the 18 November 2024 the squad for the Dubai and Cape Town tournaments, the first two of the season was announced. With Blyde on leave and Ikenasio, Kaka and Waaka injured, the squad was Kelly Brazier, Dhys Faleafaga, Jazmin Felix-Hotham, Theresa Fitzpatrick, Sarah Hirini (captain), Justine McGregor, Jorja Miller, Manaia Nuku, Mahina Paul, Risi Pouri-Lane (vice-captain), Alena Saili, Kelsey Teneti, Katelyn Vaha'akolo and Olive Watherston. Making their debuts were 18 year old McGregor, 13 cap fifteen-a-side Black Fern Vaha'akolo and 20 year old Olive Watherston. The squad departed that same week for Abu Dubai where as per in previous seasons they would spend a week acclimatizing and training prior to Dubai.

At the Dubai tournament which was held on 30 November–1 December 2024 the team went through the pool play undefeated beating Brazil 33-5 and Japan 36-12, before going on to beat Ireland 33-12 in their quarter-final and France 28-14 in the semi-final. They then lost 28-24 to Australia in the final.

At the second tournament of the season which was held in Cape Town on 7–8 December 2024 the team beat China 40-10 and Japan 22-12 in pool play. With no quarter-finals (due to it being a back to back tournament) they beat France 43-0 in the semi-final before with tries from Miller, Felix-Hotham, Teneti and Faleafaga they triumphed 26-12 over USA in the final, to win the tournament. Cape Town was notable for both veteran Kelly Brazier and coach Corey Sweeney reaching the milestone of 50 tournaments.

In December 2024 Stu Ross left the team after 12 years in various roles, including assistant coach.

For the third tournament of the season which was held in Perth on 24–26 January 2025 the squad was Michaela Blyde, Kelly Brazier, Dhys Faleafaga, Jazmin Felix-Hotham, Sarah Hirini (captain), Jorja Miller, Manaia Nuku, Mahina Paul, Risi Pouri-Lane (vice-captain), Alena Saili, Theresa Setefano, Kelsey Teneti and Katelyn Vaha'akolo. The team went through the pool play undefeated beating Brazil 50-7, Ireland 46-0 and Japan 53-5, before going on to beat China 29-0 in their quarter-final and France 36-7 in the semi-final. They then lost 28-26 to Australia in the final. The tournament was notable for Michaela Blyde after scoring four tries in the semi-final becoming the second woman to score 250 tries in the HSBC international sevens competition.

For the fourth tournament of the season which was held in Vancouver on 21–23 February 2025 the squad was Michaela Blyde, Maia Davis, Dhys Faleafaga, Jazmin Felix-Hotham, Sarah Hirini (captain), Jorja Miller, Manaia Nuku, Mahina Paul, Risi Pouri-Lane (vice-captain), Alena Saili, Theresa Setefano, Kelsey Teneti and Stacey Waaka. Waaka was returning from a serious injury. Together with Davis, who was attending her first tournament since finishing secondary school they replaced Kelly Brazier and Katelyn Vaha'akolo, who had left to participate in Super Rugby Aupiki pre-season commitments. The team went through the pool play undefeated beating Ireland 58-7, China 38-7 and United States 37-0. They then defeated Canada 34-12 in their quarter-final and long-time rivals Australia 34-10 in their semi-final to reach their 50th final, in which they beat Fiji 41-7 to give them their 39th tournament title. Their third successive tournament win at Vancouver was notable for Michaela Blyde scoring five tries in the first eight minutes of the team’s pool match against Ireland to pass Portia Woodman’s record of 256 tries and become the Sevens Series all-time leading women's try scorer and for the debut of Maia Davis who scored a try in the final.

On 19 March 2025 it was announced that Dhys Faleafaga, Theresa Fitzpatrick, Jorja Miller, Risi Pouri-Lane, Alena Saili. Kelsey Teneti and Stacey Waaka were making themselves available for selection for the New Zealand fifteen-a-side team to contest the 2025 Women's Rugby World Cup. As a result it was intended that Faleafaga, Fitzpatrick, Pouri-Lane, Saili and Teneti would not participate in the Los Angeles tournament at the end of the sevens season in order to attend the fifteen-a-side squad's first camp of the year in April. Miller and Waaka would then join the squad for the Pacific Four Series in May.

For the fifth tournament of the season which was held in Hong Kong on 28–30 March 2025 the team was unchanged from that which had triumphed in Vancouver. The team went through the pool play undefeated beating China 45-0, United States 33-21 and Brazil 29-5. They then defeated Brazil 31-7 in their quarter-final and Canada 41-0 in their semi-final, before disposing of long-time rivals Australia 26-12 in the final to give them their third consecutive Hong Kong sevens title, and 40th tournament title in the sevens series. As well as having won 18 consecutive games at Hong Kong the tournament was notable for captain Hirini scoring her 100th try in the pool play game against Brazil. Unusually, Stacey Waaka didn't score a try during the tournament. The only downside was Nuku rupturing her anterior cruciate ligament (ACL) in the final, which resulted in her having to be carried from the field and later piggy-backed by a fellow team member to the awards ceremony and the haka. The injury ruled her out from playing for the rest of the season.

For the sixth tournament of the season which was held in Singapore on 4–6 April 2025 the team was unchanged from that which had triumphed in Vancouver and Hong Kong. The team went through the pool play undefeated beating China 38-0 and Brazil 48-0. With no quarter-finals being played they then defeated France 40-13 in the semi-final, before crushing Trans-Tasman rivals Australia 31-7, in what was their 28th Cup final against each other. Over the four matches of the tournament the team outscored their opponents by a margin of 147 to 21. By winning both of their pool matches New Zealand gained sufficient points to ensure that they retained the league series title, finishing with 116 points, 10 points ahead of their closest rival, Australia.

For the series' grand final tournament held in Los Angeles on 3–4 May 2025 the squad was Michaela Blyde, Maia Davis, Jazmin Felix-Hotham, Sarah Hirini (captain), Jaymie Kolose, Justine McGregor, Danii Mafoe (reserve), Jorja Miller, Mahina Paul, Risi Pouri-Lane (vice-captain), Kelsey Teneti, Stacey Waaka and Olive Watherston. As Manaia Nuku was unavailable due to a knee injury Risi Pouri-Lane was recalled from the New Zealand fifteen-a-side training camp to ensure the team had enough cover for the halfback position. Teneti also became available as she was considered a long shot to make the fifteen-a-side squad for the upcoming Pacific Four Series. Le’Oxeayn Maiu’u was initially named to make her debut, but suffered an ACL injury in the last training session prior to team’s departure. She was replaced by the uncapped Danii Mafoe being named as a reserve. The team went through the pool play undefeated beating Great Britain 41-12, Japan 50-7 and Canada 41-5. With no quarter-finals being played they then defeated United States 34-7 in the semi-final, before crushing Trans-Tasman rivals Australia 31-7 to add the series championship to their league series title. Over the course of the tournament the team outscored their opponents by 33 tries to six. The team ended the season having won 35 of 37 games, including their last 21 in a row, along the way amassing five titles and two runner-up finishes. With 326 points, Risi Pouri-Lane was the season's leading points scorer.

=== Ignite7 2025 ===
During 2025 New Zealand Rugby held the fourth iteration of Ignite7, a program to identify the next generation of women players with applicants invited from a wide range of sports. The cumulation was a two-day tournament held at Blake Park, in Tauranga over the weekend of 1–2 November 2025. Here 48 of the most promising players were divided into four teams, as follows:

- Team Bolt (coached by Kelly Brazier), contained Elinor-Plum King, Arene Landon-Lane, Kavanah Lene, Arlia MacCarthy, Psalm Maletino, Jayda Maniapoto, Kaea Nepia, Kiana Pohe, Te Pumanawa o toku ate Rogers, Presayus Singh, Tara Turner and Charlotte Va'afusuaga.
- Team Inferno (coached by Renee Woodman-Wickliffe), which contained Louise Blyde, Chloe Dixon, Kate Donald, Wikitoria Doyle, Mele Latu'ila, Paris Lokotui, Holly-Rae Mete Renata, Grace Ngataua, Nia Sutherland, Rangimarie Sturmey, Tiana Tiro and Asha Taumoepeau-Williams.
- Team Power (coached by Kristina Sue) which contained Reese Anderson, Taufa Bason, Bailey-Rae Edwards, Gillian Fa'aumu, Anahera Hamahona, Lela Ieremia, Harmony Kautai, Angelica Mekemeke Vahai, Lialanie Muamua, Paris Robertson, Ngaawaimarino Simpkins and Riko Yoshida.
- Team Surge (coached by Hazel Tubic) which contained Keelah Bodle, Litia Bulicakau, Emacyn Ieremia, Kim Lammers, Kyla Lynch-Brown, Keira Mete Renata, Rosie Moffitt, Sariyah Paitai, Liv Robson, Sienna Stowers-Smith, Shyrah Tuliau-Tua'a and Kaia Walker-Waitoa.

Power beat Bolt 29-15 to win the women's Ignite7 competition.

Concurrent with Ignite7, warm-up games for the 2025–2026 Sevens Series season were held between the New Zealand women's sevens team and the national teams of Australia, Fiji and Japan. The New Zealand team consisted of Sylvia Brunt, Maia Davis, Jaymie Kolose, Dhys Faleafaga, Jazmin Felix-Hotham, Justine McGregor, Danii Mafoe, Mahina Paul, Alena Saili, Braxton Sorensen-McGee, Keira Su’a-Smith, Kelsey Teneti, Katelyn Vaha'akolo, Stacey Waaka and Olive Watherston. Risi Pouri-Lane and Jorja Miller were absent from the team, in Miller's case due to her having recently undergone surgery on a thumb.

On day one New Zealand defeated Japan 29-5, but lost to both Australia 38-5, and Fiji 19-10. On the second they defeated Japan 35-7 and Fiji 34-29 but lost again to Australia 40-5.

=== 2025–2026 Sevens Series season ===
On the 20 November 2025 the squad for the Dubai and Cape Town tournaments, the first two of the season was announced. With Hirini and Blyde on maternity leave and Le-Oxeayn Maiu’u and Manaia Nuku unavailable, the squad was Maia Davis, Jazmin Felix-Hotham, Theresa Fitzpatrick, Jaymie Kolose, Danii Mafoe, Jorja Miller (vice-captain), Mahina Paul, Risi Pouri-Lane (captain), Alena Saili, Braxton Sorensen-McGee, Kelsey Teneti, Katelyn Vaha'akolo and Stacey Waaka, with Olive Watherston the travelling reserve. Making their debuts were Mafoe and Sorensen-McGee. Kolose injured a hand while training in Dubai and was replaced in the playing squad by Watherston.

At the Dubai tournament which was held on 29–30 November 2025 New Zealand started pool-play by defeating France 21–14, with Sorensen-McGee and Mafoe making their international debuts off the bench. They then lost to the United States 17-21 before recovering to defeat Fiji 31-12 which was sufficient to ensure that they finished top of their pool. They then defeated Japan 31-5 in the semi-final before triumphing 29-14 over Australia in the final. To New Zealand's delight their win bought an end to arch-rivals Australia's 32 game winning streak and five consecutive titles at Dubai. Jorja Miller was named player of the final.

At the second tournament of the season which was held in Cape Town on 29–30 November 2025 the team went undefeated through pool-play undefeated, first overcoming Great Britain 38-10, with debut tries for Danii Mafoe and Braxton Sorensen-McGee, who also added four conversions. New Zealand have won all of their 13 encounters to date. They then defeated Fiji 31-19, with Jorja Miller scoring a hat trick, while in the 38-12 victory over the United States Kelsey Teneti scored a hat-trick. The team then overcame France 19-7 in the semi-final. In the final against Australia they were at one stage down 26-0, before two late tries reduced New Zealand's losing margin to a still decisive 26-12.

Separately a New Zealand development squad consisting of Poppy Baxter, Louise Blyde, Renee Holmes, Asha James, Kavanah Lene, Danii Mafoe, Justine McGregor, Kiana Pohe, Nagaawaimarino Simpkins, Presayus Singh, Asha Taumopeau-Williams and Te Arani Vulu competed at the Coral Coast 7s held in Fiji on 15-17 January 2026. The team was coached by Blair Baxter, assisted by Kelly Brazier.

Prior to the seven series's third tournament which was held at Singapore on 31 January–1 February 2026 Manaia Nuku returned from injury and although she travelled with the team she was not selected for the official squad for Singapore and Perth which consisted of Maia Davis, Jazmin Felix-Hotham, Jaymie Kolose, Danii Mafoe, Jorja Miller, Mahina Paul, Risi Pouri-Lane (captain), Alena Saili, Braxton Sorensen-McGee, Kelsey Teneti, Katelyn Vaha'akolo, Stacey Waaka and Olive Watherson. Wearing black armbands as a mark of respect to honour those who died in the 22 January 2026 landslide at Mount Maunganui the New Zealanders commenced pool-play with their biggest ever win over a green Great Britain side that had six debutants and four others with experience at fewer than five tournaments. The final 64-0 core reflected that 10 tries had been scored among them 20 year old Olive Watherston's first at senior international level. The next game which was against Canada was a much tighter and was only won with 16 seconds left to play after Jorja Miller scored a try give a 19-12 victory. New Zealand then defeated France 55-7. The victory surpassed the New Zealanders previously highest score of 54 points against France which they had they scored in Sao Paulo in 2015. In the semi-final they defeated the United States 44-7. In the final tries from Jazmin Felix-Hotham (2) Jorja Miller (2), Mahina Paul and Katelyn Vaha'akolo combined with strong defence were sufficient to defeat Australia 36-7 and thus secure their third consecutive Singapore title. Miller was named player of the final. Over the course of the five match tournament they scored 218 points with their rivals posting only 33 in reply. with the try count being 36 with just five tries conceded.

Pool play in the fourth tournament of the season which was held in Perth on 7–8 February 2026 opened with New Zealand behind Japan 10-12 with four minutes left to play before they run in four tries to finish 34-12. The team completed pool play by overwhelming Fiji 36-5 and the United States 31-0 to end top of their pool. The New Zealanders then defeated an inexperienced French side 34-14 in the semi-final which bought their overall semi-final winning ratio up to 57 of 65. New Zealand's tournament ended with them dominating defending champions Australia, 29-7 in the final to win their first title in Perth, and to bring to an end their rivals ten-game winning streak at Perth. The final was notable for Alena Saili scoring her 50th try. Kelsey Teneti was named player of the final award, ending the tournament with eight tries, two of them in the final.

In late February 2026 it was announced that both Nuku and Pouri-Lane had re-signed with New Zealand Rugby through to the Olympics in 2028.

The travelling squad for Vancouver and New York consisted of Jazmin Felix-Hotham, Jaymie Kolose, Danii Mafoe, Jorja Miller, Manaia Nuku Mahina Paul, Risi Pouri-Lane (captain), Alena Saili, Braxton Sorensen-McGee, Kelsey Teneti, Katelyn Vaha'akolo, Stacey Waaka and Olive Watherson. Pool play in the Vancouver tournament on 7–8 March 2026 saw New Zealand finish top of their pool after disposing of Great Britain 35-5, Japan 43-5 and France 38-17 The game against Japan saw Jorja Miller score her 100th sevens try. It had taken her 27 tournaments, putting her third in New Zealand rankings behind Porta Woodman and Michaela Blyde who had both taken 15 tournament to reach the same milestone. By the time the semi-final arrived against the United States Jazmin Felix-Hotham, Manaia Nuku and Braxton Sorensen-McGee were unavailable due to injury which depleted the team's reserves bench to three. Helped by two tries from Jorja Miller the team won 19-12 in a closely fought match. With its reserves bench still reduced to three, New Zealand entered the final against Australia at a disadvantage. Despite this they were leading 12-5 at halftime, before Australia leveled the score at 17-17 with two minutes left to play, until a try to Alena Saili allowed the New Zealanders to ultimately triumph 24-17. Jorja Miller was named player of the final. Her try in the final bought her total number of tries in Sevens finals to 17, behind Blyde (38), Woodman (34), Maddison Levi (18) and ahead of Waaka (14).

With Jazmin Felix-Hotham and Braxton Sorensen-McGee unavailable due to an ankle injury and concussion respectively Maia Davis flew from New Zealand to replace them at the New York tournament held on 14–15 March 2026, At this tournament the New Zealanders secured the series league title after defeating Great Britain 46-5 and Fiji 31-10 in pool play, which secured them passage to the semi-finals. This meant that they could not be caught in the overall standings even with a fourth place. They completed pool play with a 29-19 victory over France. Manaia Nuku celebrated her return from being sidelined for 349 days by an ACL injury with a try in the game against Great Britain. In the semi-final hosts United States were defeated 26-14. In the final Australia led 21-5 with five minutes left on the clock when New Zealand upset them by scoring 17 unanswered points in three minutes and 42 seconds to finish 22-21 and win the tournament. The win meant that New Zealand had won 47 out of 59 sevens series finals and 26 out of 36 finals against Australia. Kelsey Teneti was named player of the final. The tournament was notable for Jorja Miller with four tries in pool play becoming after Blyde, Woodman and Waaka the only New Zealand Sevens players to have scored 30-plus tries in a season.

The travelling squad for the Hong Kong tournament which was held on 17–19 April 2026 consisted of Maia Davis, Jaymie Kolose, Jorja Miller, Manaia Nuku, Mahina Paul, Risi Pouri-Lane (captain), Alena Saili, Braxton Sorensen-McGee, Kelsey Teneti, Katelyn Vahaakolo, Stacey Waaka and Olive Watherston. Jazmin Felix-Hotham was unavailable due to injury. In what was the first tournament of three in the 12 team championship series New Zealand went through pool-play at Hong Kong with wins over Brazil 29-12, Japan 38-7 and Fiji 38-0, before defeating Spain 32-5 in the quarter-final and Canada 31-12 in the semi-final. The final was against old foe Australia where with the contribution of tries from Mahina Paul on her 25th birthday, Jorja Miller and Kelsey Teneti the team triumphed 19-14. This bought New Zealand's wins at Hong Kong to 23 in their last 24 matches. Risi Pouri-Lane was named the Player of the Final.

With Dhys Faleafaga, Theresa Fitzpatrick and Le’Oxeayn Maiu’u unavailable and Braxton Sorensen-McGee a late withdrawal due to standdown from a concussion the team for the final two tournaments of the series was Maia Davis, Jazmin Felix-Hotham, Jaymie Kolose, Justine McGregor, Danii Mafoe, Jorja Miller, Mahina Paul, Manaia Nuku, Risi Pouri-Lane (captain), Alena Saili, Kelsey Teneti, Katelyn Vahaakolo and Stacey Waaka. The first of these was held in Valladolid, Spain on 29-31 May. In pool play New Zealand defeated Argentina 38–7, Brazil 40–12 and Japan 47–14. In the quarter-final they triumphed 33-7 over Spain. The shock defeat of Australia by the United States in pool play meant that New Zealand faced their trans-Tasman rivals in the semi-final. After having won their last six encounters and without Australia not having the services of Maddison Levi and Tia Hinds due to injury New Zealand were confident as they went into the match. They had a 11 point lead with three minutes remaining only for Australia to fight back to claim a 28-26 win. The team recovered to win the play-off for third, against Canada 50-14, with Kelsey Teneti scoring five tries.

=== 2026–2027 Sevens Series season ===
As part of their preparation for the 2026-27 international sevens season the New Zealand team participated in three games against the Australian team, two of which were on 16 October at the Kick On Sevens tournament at Easts Rugby Club in Sydney , with Australia winning the first game 24-19 and the second 36-26. These were followed by a one-off fixture prior to the All Blacks v Wallabies Test match on 17 October at Accor Stadium. These games were not capped appearances. The New Zealand team consisted of Keelah Bodle, Renee Holmes, Jazmin Felix-Hotham, Kavanah Lene, Jorja Miller, Manaia Nuku, Sariyah Paitai, Mahina Paul, Risi Pouri-Lane (captain), Te Pumanawa o Toku Ate Rogers, Kelsey Teneti, Katelyn Vahaakolo and Olive Watherston.

== Operation ==
The sevens team is centralized at Mount Maunganui, Tauranga where they train and operate out of the University of Waikato Adams Centre for High Performance.

Besides player, coaching and support staff salaries a massive portion of the cost of operating the sevens team goes toward the logistical costs associated with international travel throughout the year to global stops with the player's union agreement specifying that they fly business class.

Because Rugby Sevens is an Olympic sport, the team receives dedicated external funding from Sport New Zealand via High Performance Sport New Zealand (HPSNZ). For the current Olympic cycle though to the 2028 Los Angeles Olympic the Women’s Sevens team was awarded an annual grant of NZ$1.2 million in direct high-performance grants, which is unchanged from the previous Olympic cycle. Due to their high medal return rate this is higher than the men's sevens allotment of NZ $750,000.

A Deliotte report in 2026 for New Zealand Rugby titled "Rugby System Programme - Rugby Summit Pre-read" stated that the New Zealand Women’s Sevens team had a operating deficit of approximately NZ$2.5 million per year.

== Haka ==
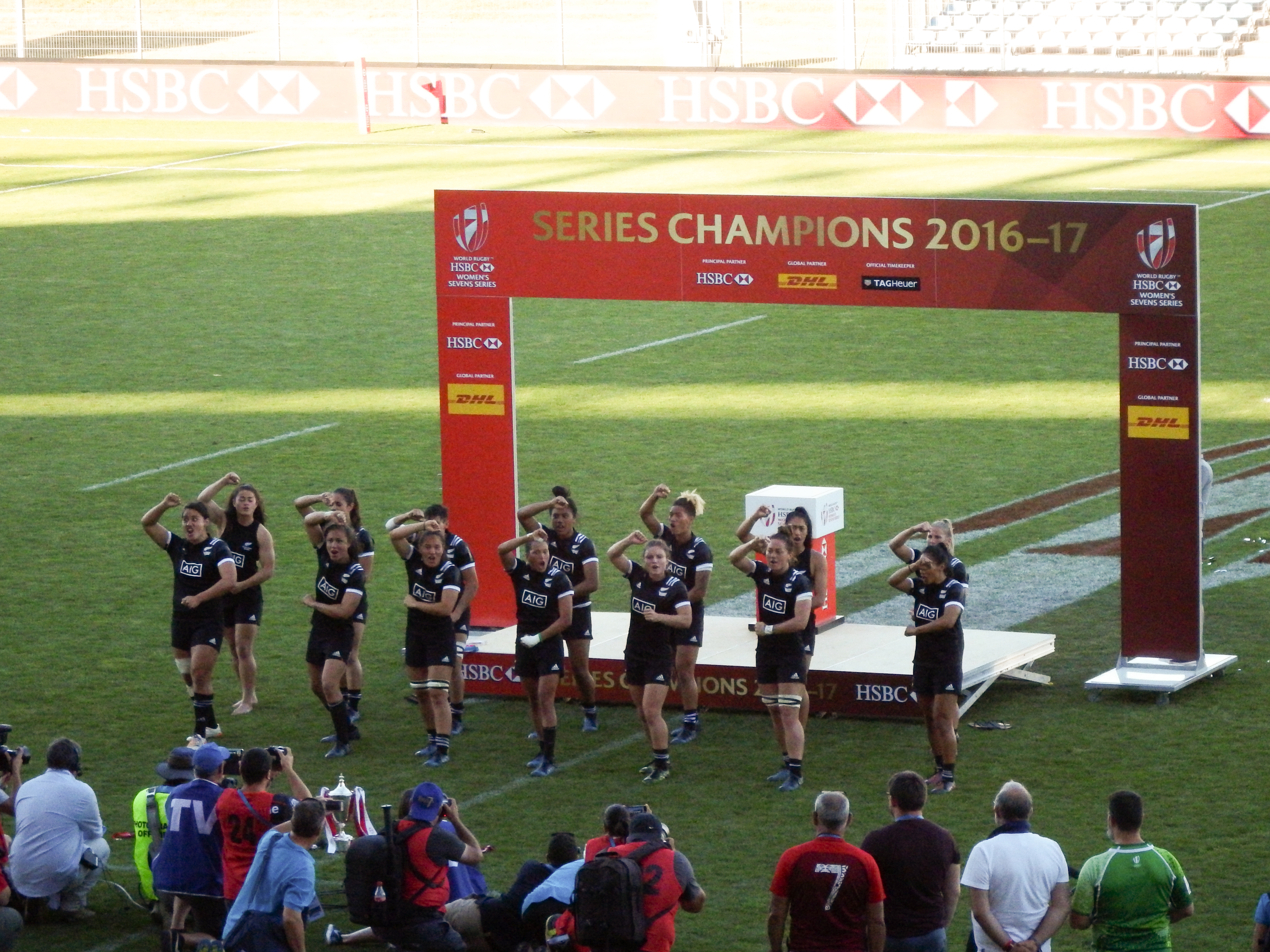
The New Zealand team performing a haka at the end of the Clermont Sevens tournament in 2017.

In common with other New Zealand representative rugby team the New Zealand Women's Sevens team performs a haka (a Māori challenge) The Sevens team use the Ngā Rongo Toa haka. Compared with the hakas in fifteen-a-side rugby which are performed at the start of a game, the Sevens haka is performed after the last game of a tournament and is also performed by the team to honour a team members significant career milestones and at their weddings. It is performed by both team members and respective of their gender, coaches and support staff.

== Tournament records ==
=== Rugby World Cup Sevens ===
The Black Ferns Sevens have competed in all four World Cup Sevens for the Women's, and have made the final in all four tournaments. They have won two World Cups and have been runners-up twice.

Year	Round	Position	Pld	W	L	D
(United Arab Emirates) 2009	Final	2nd place, silver medalist(s)	6	5	1	0
(Russia) 2013	Final	1st place, gold medalist(s)	6	6	0	0
(United States) 2018	Final	1st place, gold medalist(s)	4	4	0	0
(South Africa) 2022	Final	2nd place, silver medalist(s)	4	3	1	0
Total	4/	2 Titles	20	18	2	0

=== Summer Olympics ===
New Zealand have played in three Summer Olympic Tournaments and have made the final in all three competitions. In 2016, they were runners-up and have obtained back to back Gold Medals in the 2021 and 2024 tournaments.

Year	Round	Position	Pld	W	L	D
(Brazil) 2016	Final	2nd place, silver medalist(s)	6	5	1	0
(Japan) 2020	Final	1st place, gold medalist(s)	6	6	0	0
(France) 2024	Final	1st place, gold medalist(s)	6	6	0	0
Total	3/3	2 Titles	18	17	1	0

=== Commonwealth Games ===
The Black Ferns Sevens have played in two Commonwealth Games Sevens Tournaments. They have made the Final once and would go on to win that tournament but lost in the semi-finals in the next one before placing 3rd overall.

Year	Round	Position	Pld	W	L	D
(Australia) 2018	Final	1st place, gold medalist(s)	5	5	0	0
(England) 2022	Bronze medal match	3rd place, bronze medalist(s)	5	4	1	0
Total	2/2	1 Title	10	9	1	0

=== Oceania Women's Sevens Championship ===
New Zealand have been the Oceania Women's Sevens Champions 4 times, while they have been runners-up 2 times and have been 3rd placed three times as well. They did not compete in the 2015 and 2016 tournaments, also in 2020 which was cancelled due to the COVID-19 pandemic, and in 2022.

Year	Round	Position	Pld	W	L	D
(Samoa) 2008	Final	2nd place, silver medalist(s)	6	5	1	0
(Fiji) 2012	Final	1st place, gold medalist(s)	6	6	0	0
(Australia) 2013	Semi-finalist	3rd place, bronze medalist(s)	6	4	2	0
(Australia) 2014	Final	1st place, gold medalist(s)	7	7	0	0
(New Zealand) 2015	did not attend					
(Fiji) 2016	did not attend					
(Fiji) 2017	Final	1st place, gold medalist(s)	5	5	0	0
(Fiji) 2018	Final	2nd place, silver medalist(s)	5	4	1	0
(Fiji) 2019	Semi-finalist	3rd place, bronze medalist(s)	5	3	2	0
2020	No tournament					
(Australia) 2021	Round-robin	1st place, gold medalist(s)	6	6	0	0
(New Zealand) 2022	Competed as split teams					
(Australia) 2023	Round-robin	3rd place, bronze medalist(s)	6	1	4	1
Total	9/12	4 Titles	52	41	10	1

=== Women's Sevens Series ===
The Black Ferns Sevens have dominated the Women's Sevens Series having by 16 March 2026 won 62 of the 94 tournaments they contested, triumphing in 383 of 423 games, 8 out of the 12 seasons, been runners–up twice, placing 3rd in the 2023–24 season, and 5th in a disrupted 2021–22 season. The 2020–21 season was cancelled due to the COVID-19 pandemic.

Beginning with the 2023-24 season the format changed to consist of a League Champion awarded to the team in an eight team competition with the most points over all tournaments prior to the last. The last tournament which featured only the top eight teams was a Grand Final with the winner of that tournament crowned Series champion. In the 2025-26 season the format changed to nine events, the first six featuring eight teams from which a Division 1 League Champion was crowned with the final three events making up the World Championship, and consisting of the eight Division 1 teams, and the top four SVNS Division 2 teams.

Series	Season	Events	League Championship Position	Series Championship Position	Points
I	2012–13	4	–	1st place, gold medalist(s)	74
II	2013–14	5	–	1st place, gold medalist(s)	96
III	2014–15	6	–	1st place, gold medalist(s)	108
IV	2015–16	5	–	2nd place, silver medalist(s)	80
V	2016–17	6	–	1st place, gold medalist(s)	116
VI	2017–18	5	–	2nd place, silver medalist(s)	90
VII	2018–19	6	–	1st place, gold medalist(s)	110
VIII	2019–20	5	–	1st place, gold medalist(s)	96
–	2020–21	Cancelled due to impacts of the COVID-19 pandemic.			
IX	2021–22	6	–	5th	38
X	2022–23	7	–	1st place, gold medalist(s)	138
XI	2023–24	8	1st place, gold medalist(s)	3rd place, bronze medalist(s)	126
XII	2024–25	7	1st place, gold medalist(s)	1st place, gold medalist(s)	116
XIII	2025–26	6	1st place, gold medalist(s)	2nd place, silver medalist(s)	118
Total		12/12	3 titles	8 titles	1,306

== Players ==
=== Current squad ===
Squad updated to: 20 December 2025

(New Zealand) Black Ferns 7's

#	Player	Position	Height	Weight	Date of birth	Matches	Points scored
11	Maia Davis		1.73 m (5 ft 8 in)		2 April 2006	9	15
28	Dhys Faleafaga		1.75 m (5 ft 9 in)	87 kg (192 lb)	17 October 2000	33	95
13	Jazmin Felix-Hotham	Centre	1.72 m (5 ft 8 in)	67 kg (148 lb)	2 July 2000	131	227
10	Theresa Fitzpatrick	Outside Centre	1.68 m (5 ft 6 in)	75 kg (165 lb)	25 February 1995	190	120
23	Jaymie Kolose				6 July 2001		
17	Danii Mafoe				2 August 2006		
2	Jorja Miller	Fly Half	1.67 m (5 ft 6 in)	71 kg (157 lb)	8 February 2004	113	350
1	Manaia Nuku		1.69 m (5 ft 7 in)	68 kg (150 lb)	3 September 2002	76	99
4	Mahina Paul		1.65 m (5 ft 5 in)	63 kg (139 lb)	19 April 2001	82	175
7	Risi Pouri-Lane	Outside Centre	1.64 m (5 ft 5 in)	63 kg (139 lb)	28 May 2000	143	662
12	Alena Saili		1.80 m (5 ft 11 in)	77 kg (170 lb)	13 December 1998	144	270
15	Braxton Sorensen-McGee		1.69 m (5 ft 7 in)		26 October 2006		
88	Kelsey Teneti		1.7 m (5 ft 7 in)	78 kg (172 lb)	12 May 2003	40	280
95	Katelyn Vaha'akolo		168 cm (5 ft 6 in)	72 kg (11 st 5 lb)	18 April 2000		160
3	Stacey Waaka	Fullback	1.73 m (5 ft 8 in)	73 kg (161 lb)	3 November 1995	167	570
82	Olive Watherston				17 May 2004		

=== Notable players ===
- Michaela Blyde
- Kelly Brazier
- Theresa Fitzpatrick
- Lavinia Gould
- Victoria Grant
- Honey Hireme
- Sarah Hirini
- Carla Hohepa
- Linda Itunu
- Kayla McAlister
- Huriana Manuel
- Tyla Nathan-Wong
- Hannah Porter
- Hazel Tubic
- Ruby Tui
- Stacey Waaka
- Renee Wickliffe
- Niall Williams
- Selica Winiata
- Portia Woodman-Wickliffe

== Player records ==
The following shows leading career New Zealand players based on performance in the Women's SVNS. Players in bold are still active.

Tries scored
No.	Player	Tries
1	**Michaela Blyde**	287
2	Portia Woodman-Wickliffe	256
3	**Stacey Waaka**	130
4	**Sarah Hirini**	106
5	**Jorja Miller**	103

Points scored
No.	Player	Points
1	Tyla King	1,448
2	**Michaela Blyde**	1,435
3	Portia Woodman-Wickliffe	1,280
4	**Stacey Waaka**	650
5	**Jorja Miller**	515

Matches played
No.	Player	Matches
1	**Sarah Hirini**	287
2	Tyla King	269
3	Portia Woodman-Wickliffe	241
4	**Michaela Blyde**	240
5	Kelly Brazier	227

=== Award winners ===
The following New Zealand Sevens players have been recognised at the World Rugby Awards since 2013:

World Rugby Women's 7s Player of the Year (2013–18)
Year	Nominees	Winners
2013	Kayla McAlister	**Kayla McAlister**
2014	Sarah Hirini	—
2014	Kayla McAlister (2)	—
2015	Sarah Hirini (2)	**Portia Woodman**
2015	Portia Woodman	**Portia Woodman**
2016	Portia Woodman (2)	—
2017	Michaela Blyde	**Michaela Blyde**
2017	Ruby Tui	**Michaela Blyde**
2018	Michaela Blyde (2)	**Michaela Blyde** (2)
2018	Sarah Hirini (3)	**Michaela Blyde** (2)
2018	Portia Woodman (3)	**Michaela Blyde** (2)

World Rugby Women's 7s Player of the Year (2019–23)
Year	Nominees	Winners
2019	Sarah Hirini (4)	**Ruby Tui**
2019	Tyla Nathan-Wong	**Ruby Tui**
2019	Ruby Tui (2)	**Ruby Tui**
2021	Sarah Hirini (5)	—
2023	Michaela Blyde (3)	**Tyla Nathan-Wong**
2023	Tyla Nathan-Wong (2)	**Tyla Nathan-Wong**
2024	Michaela Blyde (4)	—
2024	Jorja Miller	—
2025	Jorja Miller (2)	**Jorja Miller**

World Rugby Women's 7s Dream Team
Year	No.	Player
2024	2.	Michaela Blyde
2024	6.	Jorja Miller
2025	1.	Michaela Blyde (2)
2025	5.	Jorja Miller (2)
2025	7.	Risi Pouri-Lane

== Coaches ==
Name	Years
Darryl Suasua	2000, 2009
Sean Horan	2012–2016
Allan Bunting (Note: Allan Bunting and Cory Sweeney were appointed as Co-coaches in 2019 through until the Tokyo Olympics.)	2016–2021
Cory Sweeney	2019–Present

== Bibliography ==
- Hireme-Smiler, Honey; McFadden, Suzanne (2024). Honey: My Story of Love, Loss and Victory (Softcover). Auckland: David Bateman. ISBN 978-1-77689-074-3.
- Swannell, Rikki (2022). Sevens Sisters: How a People First Culture Turned Silver into Gold (Paperback). Auckland: Mower. ISBN 978-1-990003-58-5.
- Tui, Ruby; Thomson, Margie (2022). Straight Up (Softcover (Large Print)). Auckland: Allen & Urwin. pp. 187–189. ISBN 978-0-36939-583-2.

Awards
Preceded by Team New Zealand	Halberg Awards – New Zealand Team of the Year; 2018	Succeeded by Silver Ferns
Preceded by Lisa Carrington	Lonsdale Cup; 2018	Succeeded by Silver Ferns
