= 1999 Hong Kong Women's Sevens =

- Host nation: Hong Kong
- Date: March 22–24, 1999

Cup
- Champion: New Zealand Wild Ducks
- Runner-up: United States

Plate
- Winner: Samoa
- Runner-up: Japan

The 1999 Hong Kong Women's Sevens was the second Hong Kong Women's Sevens to be held. It took place between the 22–24 March 1999. Fiji were meant to attend but didn't hence only two teams in Pool C.

An unofficial side from New Zealand, the New Zealand Wild Ducks, won the tournament.

== Pool stages ==
Key to colours in group tables
Teams that advanced to the Cup
Teams advanced to the Plate

=== Pool A ===
Nation	Played	Won	Drawn	Lost	For	Against
New Zealand Wild Ducks	2	2	0	0	125	0
Japan	2	1	0	1	15	71
Russia	2	0	0	2	5	74

22 March 1999

Japan	15 – 5	Russia

Hong Kong

22 March 1999

New Zealand Wild Ducks	66 – 0	Japan

Hong Kong

22 March 1999

New Zealand Wild Ducks	59 – 0	Russia

Hong Kong

=== Pool B ===
Nation	Played	Won	Drawn	Lost	For	Against
Australia	2	2	0	0	55	14
Samoa	2	1	0	1	48	17
Hong Kong	2	0	0	2	0	72

22 March 1999

Samoa	34 – 0	Hong Kong

Hong Kong

22 March 1999

Australia	17 – 14	Samoa

Hong Kong

22 March 1999

Australia	38 – 0	Hong Kong

Hong Kong

=== Pool C ===
Nation	Played	Won	Drawn	Lost	For	Against
United States	1	1	0	0	62	0
China	1	0	0	1	0	62

22 March 1999

United States	62 – 0	China

Hong Kong

=== Pool D ===
Nation	Played	Won	Drawn	Lost	For	Against
England	2	2	0	0	82	0
Arabian Gulf	2	1	0	1	22	36
Singapore	2	2	0	0	68	0

22 March 1999

Arabian Gulf	22 – 0	Singapore

Hong Kong

22 March 1999

England	36 – 0	Arabian Gulf

Hong Kong

22 March 1999

England	46 – 0	Singapore

Hong Kong

== Knockout stage ==
=== Plate ===
Quarter-finals
Samoa	36
Russia	0
Japan	15
Hong Kong	5
Singapore	12
China	0

Semi-finals
Samoa	31
Arabian Gulf	5
Japan	41
Singapore	0

Final
Samoa	46
Japan	0

=== Cup ===
Semi-finals
United States	24
England	5
New Zealand Wild Ducks	38
Australia	0

Final
United States	0
New Zealand Wild Ducks	29
