= Julie Ferguson (rugby union) =

New Zealand rugby union player

- Born: 1977 (age 48–49)

Rugby union career
Provincial / State sides
Years	Team	Apps	(Points)
2007–2009	Hawkes Bay	17	(15)
2017	Hawkes Bay	17	(15)
National sevens team
Years	Team		Comps
2009	New Zealand		

Julie Ferguson (born 1977) is a former New Zealand rugby sevens player. She represented New Zealand at the 2009 Rugby World Cup Sevens in Dubai.
