= 1997 Hong Kong Women's Sevens =

- Host nation: Hong Kong
- Date: 15–16 March 1997

Cup
- Champion: NZ Wild Ducks
- Runner-up: United States

Plate
- Winner: Australia
- Runner-up: Canada

Bowl
- Winner: Netherlands
- Runner-up: Fiji

Tournament details
- Most tries: (New Zealand) Tasha Williams

The 1997 Hong Kong Women's Sevens was the first Hong Kong Women's Sevens to be held. It took place on 15–16 March 1997. The New Zealand Wild Ducks won the tournament after defeating the United States side in the Cup final.

== Pool stages ==
Key to colours in group tables
Teams that advanced to the Cup semifinals
Teams advanced to the Plate semifinals
Teams advanced to the Bowl semifinals

=== Pool A ===
Nation	Played	Won	Drawn	Lost	For	Against
New Zealand Wild Ducks	5	5	0	0	188	0
England	5	4	0	1	90	50
Australia	5	3	0	2	120	51
Canada	5	2	0	3	77	80
Netherlands	5	1	0	4	41	141
Japan	5	0	0	5	24	218

15 March 1997

New Zealand Wild Ducks	54 – 0	Japan

Hong Kong

15 March 1997

England	10 – 7	Australia

Hong Kong

15 March 1997

Canada	31 – 0	Netherlands

Hong Kong

15 March 1997

New Zealand Wild Ducks	29 – 0	Australia

Hong Kong

15 March 1997

England	29 – 0	Netherlands

Hong Kong

15 March 1997

Canada	36 – 5	Japan

Hong Kong

15 March 1997

New Zealand Wild Ducks	26 – 0	England

Hong Kong

15 March 1997

Netherlands	41 – 0	Japan

Hong Kong

15 March 1997

Australia	24 – 5	Canada

Hong Kong

15 March 1997

England	41 – 12	Japan

Hong Kong

15 March 1997

New Zealand Wild Ducks	41 – 0	Canada

Hong Kong

15 March 1997

Australia	43 – 0	Netherlands

Hong Kong

15 March 1997

England	10 – 5	Canada

Hong Kong

15 March 1997

Australia	46 – 7	Japan

Hong Kong

15 March 1997

New Zealand Wild Ducks	38 – 0	Netherlands

Hong Kong

=== Pool B ===
Nation	Played	Won	Drawn	Lost	For	Against
United States	5	5	0	0	161	12
Hong Kong	5	4	0	1	107	25
Scotland	5	2	1	2	109	64
(Cooperation Council for the Arab States of the Gulf) Arabian Gulf	5	2	0	3	64	122
Fiji	5	1	1	3	85	120
Singapore	5	0	0	5	0	233

15 March 1997

Hong Kong	12 – 5	Fiji

Hong Kong

15 March 1997

United States	26 – 5	Scotland

Hong Kong

15 March 1997

Arabian Gulf (Cooperation Council for the Arab States of the Gulf)	42 – 0	Singapore

Hong Kong

15 March 1997

United States	10 – 7	Hong Kong

Hong Kong

15 March 1997

Scotland	44 – 0	Singapore

Hong Kong

15 March 1997

Arabian Gulf (Cooperation Council for the Arab States of the Gulf)	17 – 15	Fiji

Hong Kong

15 March 1997

Hong Kong	26 – 5	Scotland

Hong Kong

15 March 1997

Fiji	53 – 0	Singapore

Hong Kong

15 March 1997

United States	43 – 0	(Cooperation Council for the Arab States of the Gulf) Arabian Gulf

Hong Kong

15 March 1997

Fiji	12 – 12	Scotland

Hong Kong

15 March 1997

Hong Kong	21 – 5	(Cooperation Council for the Arab States of the Gulf) Arabian Gulf

Hong Kong

15 March 1997

United States	53 – 0	Singapore

Hong Kong

15 March 1997

Scotland	43 – 0	(Cooperation Council for the Arab States of the Gulf) Arabian Gulf

Hong Kong

15 March 1997

United States	29 – 0	Singapore

Hong Kong

15 March 1997

Hong Kong	41 – 0	Scotland

Hong Kong

== Knockout stage ==
=== Bowl ===
Semi-finals
16 March 1997
Netherlands	51
Singapore	5
16 March 1997
Fiji	25
Japan	5

Final
16 March 1997
Netherlands	29
Fiji	17

=== Plate ===
Semi-finals
16 March 1997
Australia	41
(Cooperation Council for the Arab States of the Gulf) Arabian Gulf	0
16 March 1997
Canada (aet)	17
Scotland	12

Final
16 March 1997
Australia	17
Canada	7

=== Cup ===
Semi-finals
16 March 1997
New Zealand Wild Ducks	39
Hong Kong	7
16 March 1997
United States	17
England	5

Final
16 March 1997
New Zealand Wild Ducks	43
United States	0
