= Sean Horan =

Rugby union career
Coaching career
- Years: Team
- 2012-2016: New Zealand
- 2009-2011: Steamers
Medal record
Coach for women's rugby sevens
Representing New Zealand
Olympic Games
Silver medal – second place	2016 Rio de Janeiro	Team competition

Sean Horan is a New Zealand rugby union and sevens coach. He coached the New Zealand women's national rugby sevens team. He was appointed as head coach in 2012. He previously coached the Bay of Plenty Steamers, in the ITM Cup, from 2009, till his rather shocking departure in 2011.

Horan's first achievement as head coach was winning the 2013 Rugby World Cup Sevens in Russia. In 2016, he helped New Zealand qualify for the 2016 Summer Olympics. He stepped down as coach for the New Zealand women's sevens team after the 2016 Olympics.
