= 2005 Hong Kong Women's Sevens =

- Host nation: Hong Kong
- Date: March

Cup
- Champion: Aotearoa Maori NZ
- Runner-up: Australia

Plate
- Winner: United States
- Runner-up: Japan

Bowl
- Winner: China
- Runner-up: Thailand

Tournament details
- Matches played: 20

The 2005 Hong Kong Women's Sevens was the eighth edition of the tournament. (Note: Source Hong Kong Union) The Aotearoa Maori New Zealand team won the tournament after beating Australia in the Cup final.

== Teams ==
Eight teams competed in the competition.

- Aotearoa Maori New Zealand
- Australia
- China
- Hong Kong
- Japan
- Singapore
- Thailand
- United States

== Group stages ==
Key to colours in group tables
Teams that advanced to the Cup Semifinal

=== Group A ===
Nation	Won	Drawn	Lost	For	Against
Aotearoa Maori New Zealand	3	0	0	98	7
United States	2	0	1	92	12
Hong Kong	0	1	2	17	93
Singapore	0	1	2	17	112

Aotearoa Maori New Zealand	12–7	United States

Hong Kong	17–17	Singapore

Aotearoa Maori New Zealand	38–0	Hong Kong

United States	47–0	Singapore

Aotearoa Maori New Zealand	48–0	Singapore

United States	38–0	Hong Kong

=== Group B ===
Nation	Won	Drawn	Lost	For	Against
Australia	3	0	0	86	0
Japan	1	1	1	43	25
China	1	1	1	24	36
Thailand	0	0	3	12	104

Australia	20–0	Japan

China	19–12	Thailand

Australia	19–0	China

Japan	38–0	Thailand

Australia	47–0	Thailand

Japan	5–5	China

== Classification stages ==
=== Cup Semi-final ===
Semi-finals
Australia	10
United States	5
Aotearoa Maori NZ	43
Japan	0

Cup Final
Aotearoa Maori NZ	19
Australia	12
Plate Final
United States	31
Japan	7

=== Bowl Semi-final ===
Semi-finals
China	22
Singapore	10
Thailand	15
Hong Kong	7

Bowl Final
China	24
Thailand	7
Shield Final
Hong Kong	34
Singapore	0
