= World Rugby SVNS Series =

International series of tournaments in men's and women's Rugby SVNS

HSBC World Rugby SVNS Series
- Current season, competition or edition: 2023-2024 World Rugby SVNS
- Formerly: IRB Sevens World Series (1999–2014); Sevens World Series (2014–2023)
- Sport: Rugby sevens
- Founded: 2023; 3 years ago
- First season: 2023-2024
- No. of teams: 12 Men’s, 12 Women’s
- Website: www.svns.com/en

In 2023, World Rugby re-branded the now legacy World Sevens series to a new World Rugby SVNS Series (known for sponsorship reasons as the HSBC SVNS). Starting in December 2023 in Dubai, Cape Town, Perth, Vancouver, Los Angeles, Hong Kong, Singapore and will conclude in Madrid in June 2024. The new series will fully combine the men's and women's tours aligning with the Olympic competition model, with both taking place on the same weekends in the same cities and venues. Both men and women's teams will earn the same with equal participation fees. The tournament is built around the idea of bringing about a festival type atmosphere and serve as a build up to the Paris 2024 Olympic Games.

== Format ==
The new format will showcase the twelve best men's and women's teams, which will conclude in a Grand Final weekend where the top eight teams will compete to be crowned Series champions. The teams ranked ninth to twelfth will compete against the top four teams from a new Challenger Series in a relegation play-off to see who secures their place in the following season.

== Host cities ==
Eight cities were announced to host tournaments across the inaugural season. With the exception Perth and Madrid, six of the cities were on the legacy World Series circuit. In July 2023, it was announced that Madrid will be the host city for The Grand Final weekend for the next three seasons.

=== Dubai SVNS ===
The Dubai SVNS will take place in Dubai at The Sevens Stadium.

=== Cape Town SVNS ===
The Cape Town SVNS will take place in Cape Town at the DHL Stadium

=== Perth SVNS ===
The Perth SVNS will take place in Perth at HBF Park on the weekend of the 26 and 28 January 2024.

=== Vancouver SVNS ===
The Vancouver SVNS will take place in Vancouver at BC Place stadium.

=== Los Angeles SVNS ===
The Los Angeles SVNS will take place in Los Angeles at Dignity Health Sports Park.

=== Hong Kong SVNS ===
The Hong Kong SVNS will take place in Hong Kong at Hong Kong Stadium.

=== Singapore SVNS ===
The Singapore SVNS, will take place in Singapore at Singapore National Stadium.

=== Madrid SVNS ===
The first three Grand Final weekends starting from the 2023–2024 season, the Madrid SVNS, will take place in Madrid at the Cívitas Metropolitano.

== Men’s and Women’s series ==
The top eight teams compete to be crowned Series champions. The teams ranked ninth to twelfth compete against the top four teams from a new Challenger Series in a relegation play-off to see who secures their place in next season's competition.

== Men and Women’s Challenger Series ==
The top four teams of the Challenger Series will compete with the teams ranked ninth to twelfth in the World Series in a relegation play-off to see who secures their place in the 2024–2025 season.

== Results by season ==
The top eight teams ranked first to eighth by each season for each series.

=== Men’s ===
Series	Season	Rds	Champion	Second	Third	Fourth	Fifth	Sixth	Seventh	Eighth	Ref
I	2023–24	8									

=== Women’s ===
Series	Season	Rds	Champion	Second	Third	Fourth	Fifth	Sixth	Seventh	Eighth	Ref
I	2023–24	8									
