= 2004 Hong Kong Women's Sevens =

- Host nation: Hong Kong
- Date: March

Cup
- Champion: Aotearoa Maori NZ
- Runner-up: Australia

Plate
- Winner: Kazakhstan
- Runner-up: Japan

Bowl
- Winner: United States
- Runner-up: Singapore

Tournament details
- Matches played: 35

The 2004 Hong Kong Women's Sevens was the seventh edition of the tournament. (Note: Source Hong Kong Rugby Union) The Aotearoa Maori New Zealand side won the tournament after winning the Cup final against Australia.

== Teams ==
Ten teams competed in the tournament. A Hong Kong Barbarians team and a Macao side featured in exhibition games.

- Aotearoa Maori New Zealand
- Australia
- China
- Hong Kong
- Japan
- Kazakhstan
- Singapore
- Sri Lanka
- Thailand
- United States

== Group stages ==
=== Pool A ===
Nation	Won	Drawn	Lost	For	Against
Aotearoa Maori New Zealand	4	0	0	143	5
Australia	3	0	1	118	14
Kazakhstan	2	0	2	65	47
Hong Kong	1	0	3	29	106
Thailand	0	0	4	7	190

Aotearoa Maori New Zealand	14–5	Australia

Kazakhstan	24–0	Hong Kong

Aotearoa Maori New Zealand	56–0	Thailand

Australia	12–0	Kazakhstan

Hong Kong	29–7	Thailand

Aotearoa Maori New Zealand	35–0	Kazakhstan

Australia	64–0	Thailand

Aotearoa Maori New Zealand	38–0	Hong Kong

Kazakhstan	41–0	Thailand

Australia	37–0	Hong Kong

=== Pool B ===
Nation	Won	Drawn	Lost	For	Against
United States	4	0	0	157	0
Japan	3	0	1	94	42
Singapore	2	0	2	27	102
Sri Lanka	1	0	3	19	71
China	0	0	4	7	89

United States	35–0	Japan

Sri Lanka	7–10	Singapore

China	0–36	United States

Japan	32–0	Sri Lanka

Singapore	10–7	China

United States	29–0	Sri Lanka

Japan	31–0	China

United States	57–0	Singapore

Sri Lanka	12–0	China

Japan	31–7	Singapore

== Classification stages ==
Macao and the Hong Kong Barbarians played three exhibition games ahead of the finals.

=== 4th and 5th placed teams ===
Nation	Won	Drawn	Lost	For	Against
Thailand	3	0	0	53	17
Hong Kong	2	0	1	58	5
Sri Lanka	1	0	2	34	63
China	0	0	3	17	77

Hong Kong	29–0	Sri Lanka

Thailand	26–5	China

Hong Kong	0–5	Thailand

Sri Lanka	22–12	China

Hong Kong	29–0	China

Sri Lanka	12–22	Thailand

=== 1st to 3rd placed teams ===
==== Group A ====
Nation	Won	Lost	For	Against
Aotearoa Maori New Zealand	2	0	91	0
Japan	1	1	19	38
Singapore	0	2	0	72

Aotearoa Maori New Zealand	38–0	Japan

Aotearoa Maori New Zealand	53–0	Singapore

Japan	19–0	Singapore

==== Group B ====
Nation	Won	Lost	For	Against
Australia	2	0	37	0
Kazakhstan	1	1	5	20
United States	0	2	0	22

United States	0–17	Australia

United States	0–5	Kazakhstan

Australia	20–0	Kazakhstan

=== Bowl Final ===
Singapore	0–68	United States

=== Plate Final ===
Japan	5–29	Kazakhstan

=== Cup Final ===
Aotearoa Maori New Zealand	10–0	Australia
