= 2001 Hong Kong Women's Sevens =

- Host nation: Hong Kong
- Date: March 28–30

Cup
- Champion: New Zealand
- Runner-up: United States

Plate
- Winner: Australia
- Runner-up: Kazakhstan

Bowl
- Winner: Hong Kong
- Runner-up: Japan

Tournament details
- Matches played: 41

The 2001 Hong Kong Women's Sevens was the fourth edition of the tournament and was held on 28–30 March. New Zealand won the tournament after defeating the United States 22–10.

== Additional information ==
The tournament also incorporated an Asian Group with Kazakhstan, Hong Kong and Japan also playing in the main competition. It is possible that the first matches for the Asian teams were knockout to see who would proceed into both the Asian Semi-finals and the main competition but this is not confirmed. If this is the case China did not play a knockout game but went on to win the Asian sub group and claim a place in the semi-finals.

== Tournament ==
=== Group stages ===
Pool A

Nation	Won	Drawn	Lost	For	Against	Points
New Zealand	4	0	0	176	0	8
Samoa	3	0	1	86	53	6
Sweden	2	0	2	53	94	4
Kazakhstan	1	0	3	49	89	2
Japan	0	0	4	14	142	0

- New Zealand 31–0 Samoa
- Sweden 29–0 Kazakhstan
- Samoa 39–7 Japan
- New Zealand 55–0 Sweden
- Kazakhstan 39–0 Japan
- Samoa 32–5 Sweden
- New Zealand 45–0 Kazakhstan
- Sweden 19–7 Japan
- Samoa 15–10 Kazakhstan
- New Zealand 45–0 Japan

Pool B

Nation	Won	Drawn	Lost	For	Against	Points
United States	4	0	0	86	0	8
England	3	0	1	100	10	6
Australia	2	0	2	88	44	4
Netherlands	1	0	3	20	98	2
Hong Kong	0	0	4	0	142	0

- USA 17–0 Australia
- England 27–0 Netherlands
- USA 33–0 Hong Kong
- England 27–0 Australia
- Netherlands 20–0 Hong Kong
- USA 10–0 England
- Australia 45–0 Netherlands
- England 46–0 Hong Kong
- USA 26–0 Netherlands
- Australia 43–0 Hong Kong

Pool C – Asian Group

Nation	Won	Drawn	Lost	For	Against	Points
China	2	1	0	43	22	5
Singapore	2	0	1	14	30	4
(Cooperation Council for the Arab States of the Gulf) Arabian Gulf	1	0	2	44	31	2
Thailand	0	1	2	15	34	1

- Singapore 7–5 Thailand
- Arabian Gulf 22–5 Thailand
- Singapore 7–5 Arabian Gulf
- China 19–17 Arabian Gulf
- China 20–0 Singapore
- China 5–5 Thailand

=== Classification stages ===
Asian Finals

Quarterfinals
Hong Kong	17
(Cooperation Council for the Arab States of the Gulf) Arabian Gulf	0
Kazakhstan	29
Thailand	0
Japan	10
Singapore	0

Semifinals
Hong Kong	19
Japan	5
Kazakhstan	48
China	0

Finals
Kazakhstan	45
Hong Kong	0
Third place
China	19
Japan	5

Bowl Final

Finals
Hong Kong	25
Japan	12

Plate Finals

Semi-finals
Australia	31
Sweden	0
Kazakhstan	24
Netherlands	0

Plate Final
Australia	41
Kazakhstan	12

Cup Finals

Semi-finals
United States	10
Samoa	0
New Zealand	25
England	0

Cup Final
New Zealand	22
United States	10
3rd Place
Samoa	25
England	0
