= 2011 Hong Kong Women's Sevens =

- Host nation: Hong Kong
- Date: 25 March

Cup
- Champion: Canada
- Runner-up: France

Plate
- Winner: Netherlands
- Runner-up: United States

Bowl
- Winner: China
- Runner-up: Japan

The 2011 Hong Kong Women's Sevens was the 14th edition of the tournament. The event was held on 25 March 2011 at Hong Kong, ten teams competed in the tournament. Canada defeated France in the Cup final to win the competition.

== Teams ==
- France
- Netherlands
- China
- Hong Kong
- Philippines
- Canada
- United States
- Japan
- Russia
- Chinese Taipei

== Group Stages ==
=== Pool A ===
Nation	Won	Drawn	Lost	For	Against
France	4	4	0	103	61
Netherlands	2	0	2	78	32
China	2	0	2	103	61
Hong Kong	2	0	2	96	76
Philippines	0	0	4	7	222

Philippines	0–56	Netherlands

Hong Kong	14–36	France

China	5–17	Netherlands

France	66–0	Philippines

Hong Kong	20–28	China

Netherlands	0–12	France

China	53–0	Philippines

Netherlands	5–15	Hong Kong

China	17–24	France

Philippines	7–47	Hong Kong

=== Pool B ===
Nation	Won	Drawn	Lost	For	Against
Canada	4	4	0	103	61
United States	3	0	1	129	38
Japan	2	0	2	53	71
Russia	1	0	3	71	88
Chinese Taipei	0	0	4	0	

Chinese Taipei	0–47	Russia

Japan	0–31	Canada

United States	31–5	Russia

Canada	64–0	Chinese Taipei

Japan	7–28	United States

Russia	7–40	Canada

United States	63–0	Chinese Taipei

Russia	12–17	Japan

Chinese Taipei	0–29	Japan

United States	7–26	Canada

== Classification stages ==
=== 11th place ===
Philippines	10–24	Chinese Taipei

=== Bowl final ===
China	31–5	Japan

=== 7th place ===
Hong Kong	5–22	Russia

=== Plate final ===
Netherlands	12–7	United States

=== Cup final ===
France	14–28	Canada
