= Emil Signes =

American rugby union coach

- University: MIT, Lehigh University, Rutgers University

Rugby union career
Coaching career
- Years: Team
- 1987–90: USA Men's 7s (head coach)
- 1991–93: USA Women's 15s (asst coach)
- 1996–2005: USA Women's 7s (head coach)

Emil Signes (born 1940) is a former coach for the United States national rugby sevens team. He also facilitated the inclusion of the rugby sevens in the Olympics, due to his promotion of women's rugby worldwide. He is the founder and coach of Atlantis, an invitational 7s rugby team for developing rugby talent among both men and women.

== Women's rugby ==
Signes is often referred to as "The Emperor" for his work growing and expanding the game of rugby sevens worldwide. In the official magazine for the first Rugby World Cup Sevens in 1993, he was profiled among leaders in rugby sevens and called an "international legend." With regard to the inclusion of rugby sevens in the Olympics:

"Rugby would not be an Olympic sport without the women, and women would not have an international sevens presence were it not for one man – Emil Signes."

— Alex Goff (American rugby sports writer and commentator), 2009

This is in line with the International Olympic Committee's focus of advancing the cause of women in sport.

== Coaching of coaches ==
Signes has earned other nicknames: For having coached numerous players that went on to become coaches, as well as for having coached both parents and their children, Signes was given the nickname of "Grandcoach" by Paddy McNally, Northern Hemisphere Referee Selector for the Sevens World Series. At the 2011 USA Sevens Collegiate Rugby Championship in Philadelphia, 18 of the 24 teams in attendance were coached by players that had formerly played on one of Signes's teams. Many of the players coached by Signes have subsequently gone on to coach national rugby teams themselves, including Al Caravelli, Tom Billups, Kathy Flores, Pete Steinberg and Alex Magleby.

Signes began coaching Princeton University Women's Rugby Club in 2004, helping them that year to the USA Rugby Collegiate Final Four. He led the team to two Ivy League championships (2005 and 2013). He also coached Princeton in the inaugural USA Sevens Women's Collegiate Rugby Championship. Signes retired from coaching 15s rugby in 2013 after serving as head coach to Princeton for 9 years, although he still works as a coaching consultant.

Signes founded Atlantis US Sevens Rugby in 1986. Between 1986 and mid-2014 Atlantis – men, women, boys, girls - has fielded 206 squads at 145 tournaments in 31 different countries. In their spring 2014 efforts, Atlantis Women won the Madrid Sevens (Spain) and the Atlantis High School Boys won the Surfside Sevens (NJ). Signes continues to coach rugby sevens through Atlantis, helping players of both genders to develop and compete for positions on the USA Sevens National Teams.

In August 2017, for his tireless efforts, the championship trophy for the USA Rugby Men’s and Women’s Club 7s National Championships are now known as the Emil Signes Cup.

== Author ==
In addition to his work coaching, Signes has authored numerous articles in Rugby Magazine (now Rugby Today). Among these is a handbook called Sevens Special, which he authored both "to provide the rugby public with an in-depth analysis of sevens so that (they) may intelligently spread the word" and "to help (players and coaches) learn about the game and play it better."

Signes was honored with induction to the U.S. Rugby Hall of Fame in 2015.
