= 2013 ARFU Women's Sevens Series =

2013 Women's Sevens Series
- Hosts: Thailand; India
- Date: 20–21 September & 9–10 November
- Nations: 12

Final positions
- Champions: China
- Runners-up: Japan
- Third: Hong Kong

Series details
- Matches played: 58

The 2013 ARFU Women's Sevens Series is the 14th edition of Asia's continental sevens tournament for women. It was played over two legs hosted in Pattaya, Thailand and in Pune, India. Japan were declared 2013 Asian Champions.

== Teams ==
- China
- Chinese Taipei
- Guam
- Hong Kong
- India
- Iran
- Japan
- Kazakhstan
- Laos
- Philippines
- Singapore
- South Korea
- Sri Lanka
- Thailand
- United Arab Emirates

== Tournaments ==
=== Thailand ===
==== Pool stages ====
20–21 September 2013 at IPE Stadium, Baeng Sen, Thailand.

===== Group A =====
Nation	Won	Drawn	Lost	For	Against
China	2	0	0	76	0
Philippines	1	0	1	32	37
Laos	0	0	5	7	76

China	44–0	Laos

Philippines	32–5	Laos

Philippines	0–32	China

===== Group B =====
Nation	Won	Drawn	Lost	For	Against
Japan	2	0	0	68	0
Chinese Taipei	1	0	1	17	46
South Korea	0	0	2	5	44

Japan	27–0	South Korea

Chinese Taipei	17–5	South Korea

Japan	41–0	Chinese Taipei

===== Group C =====
Nation	Won	Drawn	Lost	For	Against
Kazakhstan	2	0	0	82	0
Singapore	1	0	1	15	54
Guam	0	0	2	12	55

Kazakhstan	40–0	Guam

Singapore	15–12	Guam

Kazakhstan	42–0	Singapore

===== Group D =====
Nation	Won	Drawn	Lost	For	Against
Hong Kong	1	1	0	35	5
Sri Lanka	1	0	1	10	25
Thailand	0	1	1	10	15

Hong Kong	25–5	Sri Lanka

Thailand	0–5	Sri Lanka

Hong Kong	10–10	Thailand

==== Knockout stages ====
===== Bowl =====
Semi-finals
Guam	12
Laos	5
Thailand	31
South Korea	0

Bowl Final
Thailand	17
Guam	0
11th Place
South Korea	14
Laos	0

===== Plate =====
Semi-finals
Singapore	22
Taiwan	0
Sri Lanka	17
Philippines	5

Plate Final
Sri Lanka	17
Singapore	5
7th Place
Philippines	17
Taiwan	7

===== Cup =====
Quarter-finals
China	39
Singapore	0
Hong Kong	25
Taiwan	0
Japan	45
Philippines	0
Kazakhstan	25
Sri Lanka	0

Semi-finals
China	17
Hong Kong	12
Japan	17
Kazakhstan	0

Cup Final
China	14
Japan	10
3rd Place
Hong Kong	17
Kazakhstan	10

=== India ===
9–10 November 2013 at Pune, India

==== Pool stages ====
===== Group A =====
Nation	Won	Drawn	Lost	For	Against
China	4	0	0	122	20
Kazakhstan	3	0	1	101	26
Thailand	2	0	2	48	53
Sri Lanka	1	0	3	46	59
India	0	0	4	0	152

China	43–0	India

Kazakhstan	22–7	Thailand

Sri Lanka	36–0	India

China	31–7	Thailand

Kazakhstan	25–0	Sri Lanka

China	29–10	Sri Lanka

India	0–44	Kazakhstan

Thailand	5–0	Sri Lanka

China	19–10	Kazakhstan

Thailand	29–0	India

===== Group B =====
Nation	Won	Drawn	Lost	For	Against
Japan	5	0	0	145	29
Hong Kong	4	0	1	168	47
United Arab Emirates	3	0	2	78	74
Singapore	2	0	3	63	75
Iran	1	0	4	38	151
Philippines	0	0	5	14	156

Japan	53–7	Iran

Hong Kong	57–0	Philippines

Singapore	5–20	United Arab Emirates

Japan	43–0	Philippines

Singapore	29–7	Iran

Hong Kong	34–5	United Arab Emirates

Japan	33–5	Singapore

United Arab Emirates	31–7	Philippines

Hong Kong	45–14	Iran

Philippines	7–10	Iran

Japan	28–5	United Arab Emirates

Hong Kong	15–7	Singapore

United Arab Emirates	17–0	Iran

Singapore	15–0	Philippines

Japan	21–17	Hong Kong

==== Knockout stages ====
===== 9th/10th =====
Iran	20–15	India

===== 7th/8th =====
Sri Lanka	12–19	Singapore

===== 5th/6th =====
Thailand	33–19	United Arab Emirates

===== 3rd/4th =====
Kazakhstan	30–12	Hong Kong

===== Final =====
China	14–19	Japan

== Final standings ==
Rank	Team	Thailand	India	Points
1st place, gold medalist(s)	China	12	11	23
2nd place, silver medalist(s)	Japan	11	12	23
3rd place, bronze medalist(s)	Hong Kong	10	9	19
4	Kazakhstan	9	10	19
5	Singapore	7	6	13
6	Sri Lanka	8	5	13
7	Thailand	4	8	12
8	Philippines	6	2	8
9	United Arab Emirates	—	7	7
10	Taiwan	5	—	5
11	Iran	—	4	4
12	Guam	3	—	3
13	India	—	3	3
14	South Korea	2	—	2
15	Laos	1	—	1
