= 2013 Rugby World Cup Sevens qualifying – Women =

The qualification process of women's teams for the 2013 Rugby World Cup Sevens. Automatic qualification was extended to the host and the four semifinalists of the previous edition of the tournament. The remaining spots were contested in each of the six regions' respective tournaments.

== Qualified teams ==
Africa	North America and the West Indies	South America	Asia	Europe	Oceania
Automatic qualification
South Africa	United States			Russia (host)	Australia; New Zealand
Regional Qualifiers
Tunisia	Canada	Brazil	China; Japan	England; France; Ireland; Netherlands; Spain	Fiji

== Africa ==
Seven teams competed in Rabat on 29-30 September for an open spot in the World Cup, since South Africa was already automatically qualified from their semifinal placement in the 2009 World Cup Sevens. Tunisia edged out Kenya at the final to reach eligibility.

=== Pool stage ===
Pool A

Team	Pld	W	D	L	PF	PA	+/–	Pts
Kenya	3	3	0	0	77	5	+72	9
Tunisia	3	2	0	1	73	7	+66	7
Zambia	3	1	0	2	5	72	–67	5
Morocco	3	0	0	3	0	71	–71	3

Matches

29 September 2012

Tunisia	36–0	Zambia

Rabat

29 September 2012

Kenya	34–0	Morocco

Rabat

29 September 2012

Kenya	36–0	Zambia

Rabat

29 September 2012

Tunisia	32–0	Morocco

Rabat

29 September 2012

Morocco	0–5	Zambia

Rabat

29 September 2012

Tunisia	5–7	Kenya

Rabat

Pool B

Team	Pld	W	D	L	PF	PA	+/-	Pts
Uganda	2	2	0	0	34	5	+29	6
Senegal	2	1	0	1	7	27	-20	4
Zimbabwe	2	0	0	2	10	19	-9	2

Matches

29 September 2012

Senegal	7–5	Zimbabwe

Rabat

29 September 2012

Uganda	12–5	Zimbabwe

Rabat

29 September 2012

Uganda	22–0	Senegal

Rabat

=== Knockout round ===
Plate

Semi-finals
30 September 2012
Morocco	0
Zimbabwe	5
30 September 2012
Zambia	Bye

Plate Final
30 September 2012
Zimbabwe	14
Zambia	10

Cup

Semi-finals
30 September 2012
Kenya	7
Senegal	0
30 September 2012
Tunisia	19
Uganda	5

Cup/Qualifier Final
30 September 2012
Kenya	10
Tunisia	14
Third place
30 September 2012
Senegal	5
Uganda	12

== North America/Caribbean ==
On 25–26 August 2012, there was a tournament held in Twin Elm Rugby Park in Ottawa amongst five teams for one qualification bid, with the United States already qualified by making the semifinals of the 2009 Rugby World Cup women's tournament. It consisted of a round-robin tournament, with a playoff among the four highest-finishing teams, from which hosts Canada emerged winners.

=== Pool stage ===
Team	Pld	W	D	L	PF	PA	+/–	Pts
Canada	4	4	0	0	196	0	+196	12
Jamaica	4	3	0	1	60	52	+8	10
Trinidad and Tobago	4	2	0	2	68	70	–2	8
Mexico	4	1	0	3	46	111	–65	6
Cayman Islands	4	0	0	4	0	137	–137	4

Matches

25 August 2012

Canada	62–0	Mexico

Ottawa

25 August 2012

Jamaica	17–0	Cayman Islands

Ottawa

25 August 2012

Canada	50–0	Cayman Islands

Ottawa

25 August 2012

Jamaica	19–7	Trinidad and Tobago

Ottawa

25 August 2012

Canada	45–0	Jamaica

Ottawa

25 August 2012

Trinidad and Tobago	25–12	Mexico

Ottawa

25 August 2012

Canada	39–0	Trinidad and Tobago

Ottawa

25 August 2012

Mexico	35–0	Cayman Islands

Ottawa

25 August 2012

Jamaica	24–0	Mexico

Ottawa

25 August 2012

Trinidad and Tobago	36–0	Cayman Islands

Ottawa

=== Knockout round ===
Semi-finals
26 August 2012
Canada	42
Mexico	0
26 August 2012
Jamaica	5
Trinidad and Tobago	22

Final
26 August 2012
Canada	46
Trinidad and Tobago	0

== South America ==
The last qualifying tournament was held on 23−24 February 2013 in Rio de Janeiro for the sole remaining World Cup slot. Eight teams participated, with Brazil winning the tournament to qualify for the second time.

=== Pool Play ===
Pool A

Teams	Pld	W	D	L	PF	PA	+/−	Pts
Brazil	3	3	0	0	103	12	+91	
Argentina	3	2	0	1	83	36	+47	
Chile	3	1	0	2	50	53	–3	
Peru	3	0	0	3	10	145	–135	

Matches

23 February 2013

Brazil	55−0	Peru

23 February 2013

Argentina	19−12	Chile

23 February 2013

Brazil	24−12	Argentina

23 February 2013

Chile	38−10	Peru

23 February 2013

Brazil	24−0	Chile

23 February 2013

Argentina	52−0	Peru

Pool B

Teams	Pld	W	D	L	PF	PA	+/−	Pts
Uruguay	3	3	0	0	64	5	+59	9
Venezuela	3	1	1	1	44	29	+15	6
Colombia	3	1	1	1	32	25	+7	6
Paraguay	3	0	0	3	0	81	–81	3

Matches

23 February 2013

Colombia	22−0	Paraguay

23 February 2013

Uruguay	19−5	Venezuela

23 February 2013

Colombia	10−10	Venezuela

23 February 2013

Uruguay	30−0	Paraguay

23 February 2013

Uruguay	15−0	Colombia

23 February 2013

Venezuela	29−0	Paraguay

=== Playoffs ===
Plate

Semi-finals
24 February 2013
Chile	31
Paraguay	0
24 February 2013
Peru	0
Colombia	19

Final
24 February 2013
Chile	5
Colombia	19
Seventh Place
24 February 2013
Paraguay	12
Peru	15

Cup

Semi-finals
24 February 2013
Brazil	34
Venezuela	0
24 February 2013
Argentina	17
Uruguay	7

Final/Qualifier
24 February 2013
Brazil	27
Argentina	14
Third place
24 February 2013
Venezuela	5
Uruguay	17

== Asia ==
On 6–7 October 2012, ten Asian teams and Oceania third place team Fiji met in Pune, India for a qualification tournament with three bids at stake. Fiji qualified to the World Cup as champions, with China and Japan also rounding out the remainder of the bids.

=== Pool stage ===
Pool A

Team	Pld	W	D	L	PF	PA	+/–	Pts
Japan	2	2	0	0	68	5	+63	6
Hong Kong	2	1	0	1	41	19	+22	4
India	2	0	0	2	0	85	–85	2

Matches

6 October 2012

Hong Kong	36–0	India

Pune

6 October 2012

Japan	49–0	India

Pune

6 October 2012

Japan	19–5	Hong Kong

Pune

Pool B

Team	Pld	W	D	L	PF	PA	+/–	Pts
Fiji	3	3	0	0	130	14	+116	9
Chinese Taipei	3	2	0	1	78	43	+35	7
Sri Lanka	3	1	0	2	57	70	–13	5
South Korea	3	0	0	3	0	138	–138	3

Matches

6 October 2012

Chinese Taipei	45–0	South Korea

Pune

6 October 2012

Fiji	44–7	Sri Lanka

Pune

6 October 2012

Chinese Taipei	26–7	Sri Lanka

Pune

6 October 2012

Fiji	50–0	South Korea

Pune

6 October 2012

South Korea	0–43	Sri Lanka

Pune

6 October 2012

Fiji	36–7	Chinese Taipei

Pune

Pool C

Team	Pld	W	D	L	PF	PA	+/–	Pts
China	3	3	0	0	119	0	+119	9
Thailand	3	2	0	1	76	48	+28	7
Philippines	3	1	0	2	47	67	–20	5
Malaysia	3	0	0	3	7	134	–127	3

Matches

6 October 2012

Thailand	45–0	Malaysia

Pune

6 October 2012

China	29–0	Philippines

Pune

6 October 2012

Thailand	31–7	Philippines

Pune

6 October 2012

China	49–0	Malaysia

Pune

6 October 2012

Malaysia	7–40	Philippines

Pune

6 October 2012

China	41–0	Thailand

Pune

Pool D

Team	Pld	W	D	L	PF	PA	+/–	Pts
Kazakhstan	3	3	0	0	108	0	+108	9
Singapore	3	2	0	1	39	46	–7	7
Iran	3	1	0	2	10	61	–51	5
United Arab Emirates	3	0	0	3	20	70	–50	3

Matches

6 October 2012

Singapore	20–0	Iran

Pune

6 October 2012

Kazakhstan	41–0	United Arab Emirates

Pune

6 October 2012

Singapore	19–15	United Arab Emirates

Pune

6 October 2012

Kazakhstan	36–0	Iran

Pune

6 October 2012

Iran	10–5	United Arab Emirates

Pune

6 October 2012

Kazakhstan	31–0	Singapore

Pune

=== Knockout round ===
Shield

Semi-finals
7 October 2012
Malaysia	12
United Arab Emirates	17
7 October 2012
South Korea	BYE

Shield
7 October 2012
United Arab Emirates	24
South Korea	0

Bowl

Quarter-finals
7 October 2012
India	5
Malaysia	0
7 October 2012
Sri Lanka	20
United Arab Emirates	10
7 October 2012
Philippines	BYE
7 October 2012
Iran	29
South Korea	7

Bowl
7 October 2012
India	0
Sri Lanka	33
7 October 2012
Philippines	24
Iran	5

Final
7 October 2012
Sri Lanka	7
Philippines	22
Eleventh Place
7 October 2012
India	12
Iran	17

Plate

Semi-finals
7 October 2012
Thailand	17
Singapore	12
7 October 2012
Hong Kong	27
Chinese Taipei	0

Plate
7 October 2012
Thailand	7
Hong Kong	19
Seventh Place
7 October 2012
Singapore	12
Chinese Taipei	5

Cup

Quarter-finals
7 October 2012
Japan	12
Thailand	5
7 October 2012
Fiji	47
Singapore	0
7 October 2012
China	31
Hong Kong	0
7 October 2012
Kazakhstan	34
Chinese Taipei	0

Semi-finals
7 October 2012
Japan	7
Hong Kong	31
7 October 2012
China	17
Kazakhstan	12

Final
7 October 2012
Fiji	15
China	0
Third Place/Qualifier
7 October 2012
Japan	17
Kazakhstan	7

== Europe ==
From 30 June – 1 July, the second leg of the Women's Sevens Grand Prix was held in Moscow among the twelve Grand Prix national teams in addition to the top four teams from prior lower-division tournaments. With Russia being host and therefore automatically eligible for the World Cup, five open bids were contested.

Legend
Qualified to 2013 Rugby World Cup Sevens
Already qualified

Rank	Team
1st place, gold medalist(s)	England
2nd place, silver medalist(s)	Spain
3rd place, bronze medalist(s)	Russia
4	France
5	Netherlands
6	Ireland
7	Ukraine
8	Germany
9	Portugal
10	Scotland
11	Wales
12	Italy
13	Sweden
14	Moldova
15	Switzerland
16	Croatia

== Oceania ==
8 women's teams met in Lautoka, Fiji for a 3–4 August tournament. With Australia and New Zealand already qualified for the World Cup, the other highest placing country gets to compete in 2012's Asian championship to contest the bid against a prospective Asia 3. With Fiji beating Papua New Guinea for the third place spot, they were invited to the Asian qualification tournament in Pune, India.

=== Pool stage ===
Pool A

Team	Pld	W	D	L	PF	PA	+/–	Pts
Australia	3	3	0	0	113	7	+106	9
Papua New Guinea	3	2	0	1	62	39	+23	7
Samoa	3	1	0	2	46	51	–5	5
Solomon Islands	3	0	0	3	24	87	–63	3

Matches

3 August 2012

Samoa	10–17	Papua New Guinea

Lautoka

3 August 2012

Australia	50–0	Solomon Islands

Lautoka

3 August 2012

Samoa	36–0	Solomon Islands

Lautoka

3 August 2012

Australia	29–7	Papua New Guinea

Lautoka

3 August 2012

Papua New Guinea	38–0	Solomon Islands

Lautoka

3 August 2012

Australia	34–0	Samoa

Lautoka

Pool B

Team	Pld	W	D	L	PF	PA	+/–	Pts
New Zealand	3	3	0	0	100	7	+93	9
Fiji	3	2	0	1	88	26	+62	7
Tonga	3	1	0	2	15	99	–84	5
Cook Islands	3	0	0	3	7	78	–71	3

Matches

3 August 2012

Fiji	36–7	Cook Islands

Lautoka

3 August 2012

New Zealand	54–0	Tonga

Lautoka

3 August 2012

Fiji	45–0	Tonga

Lautoka

3 August 2012

New Zealand	27–0	Cook Islands

Lautoka

3 August 2012

Cook Islands	0–15	Tonga

Lautoka

3 August 2012

New Zealand	19–7	Fiji

Lautoka

=== Knockout round ===
Plate

Semi-finals
4 August 2012
Cook Islands	5
Samoa	17
4 August 2012
Tonga	40
Solomon Islands	5

Plate
4 August 2012
Samoa	17
Tonga	12
7th Place
4 August 2012
Cook Islands	41
Solomon Islands	0

Cup

Quarter-finals
4 August 2012
Australia	22
Cook Islands	0
4 August 2012
Samoa	0
Fiji	15
4 August 2012
Papua New Guinea	24
Tonga	19
4 August 2012
Solomon Islands	0
New Zealand	52

Semi-finals
4 August 2012
Australia	26
Fiji	5
4 August 2012
New Zealand	36
Papua New Guinea	0

Final
4 August 2012
Australia	24
New Zealand	35
Qualifier vs. Asia 3
4 August 2012
Fiji	26
Papua New Guinea	14
