= 2009 ARFU Women's Sevens Championship =

- Host nation: Thailand
- Date: 30 May 2009

Cup
- Champion: China
- Runner-up: Thailand

Tournament details
- Matches played: 43

The 2009 ARFU Women's Sevens Championship was the tournaments tenth edition and was held on 30 May 2009 in Bangkok, Thailand. China defeated hosts, Thailand, in the Cup final to claim their second title.

== Teams ==
14 teams competed in the tournament. Japan withdrew due to concerns about H1N1, and South Korea withdrew due to a 'lack of preparation'.

- (Cooperation Council for the Arab States of the Gulf) Arabian Gulf
- Cambodia
- China
- Chinese Taipei
- Guam
- Hong Kong
- India
- Iran
- Kazakhstan
- Laos
- Malaysia
- Singapore
- Thailand
- Uzbekistan

== Format ==
After the Pool stages the top four in the two pools in Division 1 play in the quarter-finals. The 5th placed teams in Division 1 competed with the teams from Division 2 in two pools in the Classification Stage with the first placed teams in both pools playing in a Bowl final.

== Pool Stages ==
=== Division 1 – Pool A ===
Nation	Won	Drawn	Lost	For	Against
Thailand	4	0	0	125	10
Kazakhstan	3	0	1	99	28
(Cooperation Council for the Arab States of the Gulf) Arabian Gulf	2	0	2	52	71
Chinese Taipei	1	0	3	33	92
Iran	0	0	4	19	127

Arabian Gulf (Cooperation Council for the Arab States of the Gulf)	17–5	Chinese Taipei

Thailand	41–0	Iran

Kazakhstan	22–7	Chinese Taipei

Kazakhstan	30–0	Iran

Thailand	34–0	Chinese Taipei

Arabian Gulf (Cooperation Council for the Arab States of the Gulf)	0–37	Kazakhstan

Iran	19–21	Chinese Taipei

Thailand	29–0	(Cooperation Council for the Arab States of the Gulf) Arabian Gulf

Thailand	21–10	Kazakhstan

Iran	0–35	(Cooperation Council for the Arab States of the Gulf) Arabian Gulf

=== Division 1 – Pool B ===
Nation	Won	Drawn	Lost	For	Against
China	4	0	0	132	10
Uzbekistan	3	0	1	64	26
Guam	1	1	2	40	51
Hong Kong	1	1	2	34	91
Singapore	0	0	4	20	112

Hong Kong	12–12	Guam

Singapore	0–17	Uzbekistan

China	29–0	Guam

Hong Kong	0–32	Uzbekistan

China	19–5	Uzbekistan

Hong Kong	22–15	Singapore

Guam	7–10	Uzbekistan

Singapore	5–52	China

China	32–0	Hong Kong

Singapore	0–21	Guam

=== Division 2 ===
Nation	Won	Drawn	Lost	For	Against
Laos	3	0	0	36	22
Malaysia	2	0	1	43	22
Cambodia	1	0	2	17	29
India	0	0	3	20	43

Laos	17–10	India

Cambodia	5–17	Malaysia

Laos	12–7	Malaysia

Cambodia	7–5	India

Malaysia	19–5	India

Laos	7–5	Cambodia

== Classification stages ==
=== 9th–14th ===
Nation	Won	Drawn	Lost	For	Against
Iran	2	0	0	41	7
Malaysia	1	0	1	29	19
Cambodia	0	0	2	0	44

Iran	22–0	Cambodia

Malaysia	22–0	Cambodia

Iran	19–7	Malaysia

Nation	Won	Drawn	Lost	For	Against
Singapore	2	0	0	75	0
Laos	1	0	1	10	25
India	0	0	2	0	60

Singapore	50–0	India

Laos	10–0	India

Singapore	25–0	Laos

=== Cup Quarter-finals ===
Quarter-finals
30 May 2009
Thailand	25
Hong Kong	0
30 May 2009
China	31
Chinese Taipei	5
30 May 2009
Kazakhstan	21
Guam	5
30 May 2009
Uzbekistan	10
(Cooperation Council for the Arab States of the Gulf) Arabian Gulf	0

Semi-finals
30 May 2009
Thailand	22
Uzbekistan	10
30 May 2009
China	17
Kazakhstan	0

Cup Final
30 May 2009
China	24
Thailand	14

=== Plate Semi-finals ===
Semi-finals
30 May 2009
(Cooperation Council for the Arab States of the Gulf) Arabian Gulf	34
Hong Kong	0
30 May 2009
Guam	15
Chinese Taipei	5

Plate Final
30 May 2009
(Cooperation Council for the Arab States of the Gulf) Arabian Gulf	12
Guam	7

=== Bowl Final ===
30 May 2009

Singapore	10–7	Iran
