= 2015 ARFU Women's Sevens Championships =

2015 Asia Rugby Women's Olympic Qualification Series
- Hosts: Hong Kong; Japan
- Date: 7 March–29 November

The 2015 Asia Rugby Women's Olympic Qualification Series for rugby sevens at the 2016 Summer Olympics was held over two rounds in Hong Kong and Tokyo from 7–29 November, following a preliminary qualifying round held in Chennai on 7–8 March. Japan won both rounds to gain direct qualification to the 2016 Olympic Sevens women's tournament.

== Preliminary qualifying round ==
=== Pool stage ===
Teams	Pld	W	D	L	PF	PA	+/−	Pts
Uzbekistan	5	4	0	1	93	29	+64	13
India	5	4	0	1	66	22	+44	13
Guam	5	4	0	1	91	51	+40	13
Philippines	5	1	0	4	44	81	–37	7
Iran	5	1	0	4	49	95	–46	7
South Korea	5	1	0	4	50	115	–65	7

7 March 2015
11:40

Guam	5–15	India

Jawaharlal Nehru Stadium, India

7 March 2015
12:00

Uzbekistan	32–0	Iran

Jawaharlal Nehru Stadium, India

7 March 2015
12:20

South Korea	14–19	Philippines

Jawaharlal Nehru Stadium, India

7 March 2015
14:20

Guam	26–14	Iran

Jawaharlal Nehru Stadium, India

7 March 2015
14:40

India	12–5	Philippines

Jawaharlal Nehru Stadium, India

7 March 2015
15:00

Uzbekistan	22–7	South Korea

Jawaharlal Nehru Stadium, India

7 March 2015
16:40

Guam	24–5	Philippines

Jawaharlal Nehru Stadium, India

7 March 2015
17:00

Iran	21–22	South Korea

Jawaharlal Nehru Stadium, India

7 March 2015
17:20

India	5–12	Uzbekistan

Jawaharlal Nehru Stadium, India

7 March 2015
19:00

Guam	24–7	South Korea

Jawaharlal Nehru Stadium, India

7 March 2015
19:20

Philippines	5–17	Uzbekistan

Jawaharlal Nehru Stadium, India

7 March 2015
19:40

Iran	0–5	India

Jawaharlal Nehru Stadium, India

8 March 2015
12:20

Guam	12–10	Uzbekistan

Jawaharlal Nehru Stadium, India

8 March 2015
12:40

South Korea	0–29	India

Jawaharlal Nehru Stadium, India

8 March 2015
13:00

Philippines	10–14	Iran

Jawaharlal Nehru Stadium, India

=== Playoffs ===
Fifth place match

8 March 2015
15:00

South Korea	17–5	Iran

Jawaharlal Nehru Stadium, India

Third place match

8 March 2015
15:50

Guam	19–10	Philippines

Jawaharlal Nehru Stadium, India

Final

8 March 2015
17:05

India	0–38	Uzbekistan

Jawaharlal Nehru Stadium, India

=== Pre-qualifier placings ===
Advance to Qualifying round

Rank	Team
1	Uzbekistan
2	India
3	Guam
4	Philippines
5	South Korea
6	Iran

== Asia Olympic qualifying rounds ==
Eight women's teams were originally scheduled for the Asia Olympic qualifying rounds, but Thailand, Singapore and Uzbekistan withdrew and Guam was invited to make it six teams in the competition.

- China
- Hong Kong
- Japan
- Kazakhstan
- Sri Lanka
- Guam

=== Hong Kong ===
==== Pool stage ====
Teams	Pld	W	D	L	PF	PA	+/−	Pts
Japan	5	4	0	1	149	17	+132	13
Kazakhstan	5	4	0	1	124	45	+79	13
Hong Kong	5	3	0	2	82	61	+21	11
China	5	3	0	2	125	39	+86	11
Sri Lanka	5	1	0	4	41	169	−128	7
Guam	5	0	0	5	14	204	−190	5

7 November 2015
10:28

Japan	7−5	Kazakhstan

Hong Kong Stadium, Hong Kong

7 November 2015
10:50

China	54−0	Guam

Hong Kong Stadium, Hong Kong

7 November 2015
11:12

Hong Kong	36−5	Sri Lanka

Hong Kong Stadium, Hong Kong

7 November 2015
13:21

Kazakhstan	46−7	Guam

Hong Kong Stadium, Hong Kong

7 November 2015
13:43

Japan	48−0	Sri Lanka

Hong Kong Stadium, Hong Kong

7 November 2015
14:05

China	0−5	Hong Kong

Hong Kong Stadium, Hong Kong

7 November 2015
16:10

Sri Lanka	22–7	Guam

Hong Kong Stadium, Hong Kong

7 November 2015
16:32

China	12–22	Kazakhstan

Hong Kong Stadium, Hong Kong

7 November 2015
16:54

Japan	36–0	Hong Kong

Hong Kong Stadium, Hong Kong

8 November 2015
09:15

Japan	53–0	Guam

Hong Kong Stadium, Hong Kong

8 November 2015
09:37

China	47–7	Sri Lanka

Hong Kong Stadium, Hong Kong

8 November 2015
09:59

Hong Kong	12–20	Kazakhstan

Hong Kong Stadium, Hong Kong

8 November 2015
12:20

Sri Lanka	7–31	Kazakhstan

Hong Kong Stadium, Hong Kong

8 November 2015
12:42

Hong Kong	29–0	Guam

Hong Kong Stadium, Hong Kong

8 November 2015
13:06

Japan	5–12	China

Hong Kong Stadium, Hong Kong

==== Playoffs ====
Fifth place match

8 November 2015
15:54

Sri Lanka	5–21	Guam

Hong Kong Stadium, Hong Kong

Third place match

8 November 2015
16:16

Hong Kong	12–7	China

Hong Kong Stadium, Hong Kong

Final

8 November 2015
17:45

Japan	22–0	Kazakhstan

Hong Kong Stadium, Hong Kong

=== Japan ===
==== Pool stage ====
Teams	Pld	W	D	L	PF	PA	+/−	Pts
Kazakhstan	5	5	0	0	120	10	+110	15
Japan	5	4	0	1	140	19	+121	13
China	5	3	0	2	117	48	+69	11
Hong Kong	5	2	0	3	91	79	–47	9
Sri Lanka	5	1	0	4	36	149	−113	7
Guam	5	0	0	5	7	205	−198	5

28 November 2015
10:00

Japan	20−7	China

Chichibunomiya Rugby Stadium, Tokyo

28 November 2015
10:22

Kazakhstan	34−0	Sri Lanka

Chichibunomiya Rugby Stadium, Tokyo

28 November 2015
10:44

Hong Kong	38−0	Guam

Chichibunomiya Rugby Stadium, Tokyo

28 November 2015
12:40

China	36−7	Sri Lanka

Chichibunomiya Rugby Stadium, Tokyo

28 November 2015
13:02

Japan	39−0	Guam

Chichibunomiya Rugby Stadium, Tokyo

28 November 2015
13:24

Kazakhstan	29−5	Hong Kong

Chichibunomiya Rugby Stadium, Tokyo

28 November 2015
15:20

Guam	7–22	Sri Lanka

Chichibunomiya Rugby Stadium, Tokyo

28 November 2015
15:42

Kazakhstan	14–0	China

Chichibunomiya Rugby Stadium, Tokyo

28 November 2015
16:04

Japan	27–5	Hong Kong

Chichibunomiya Rugby Stadium, Tokyo

29 November 2015
10:00

Japan	49–0	Sri Lanka

Chichibunomiya Rugby Stadium, Tokyo

29 November 2015
10:22

Hong Kong	7–17	China

Chichibunomiya Rugby Stadium, Tokyo

29 November 2015
10:44

Kazakhstan	36–0	Guam

Chichibunomiya Rugby Stadium, Tokyo

29 November 2015
12:40

Hong Kong	36–7	Sri Lanka

Chichibunomiya Rugby Stadium, Tokyo

29 November 2015
13:02

China	57–0	Guam

Chichibunomiya Rugby Stadium, Tokyo

29 November 2015
13:24

Japan	5–7	Kazakhstan

Chichibunomiya Rugby Stadium, Tokyo

==== Playoffs ====
Fifth place match

29 November 2015
15:20

Sri Lanka	12–10	Guam

Chichibunomiya Rugby Stadium, Tokyo

Third place match

29 November 2015
15:42

China	19–10	Hong Kong

Chichibunomiya Rugby Stadium, Tokyo

Final

29 November 2015
16:04

Kazakhstan	7–14	Japan

Chichibunomiya Rugby Stadium, Tokyo

== Placings ==
Qualified to the 2016 Summer Olympics
Advanced to the Final Olympic qualifier

Rank	Team	Hong Kong	Japan
1	Japan	1	1
2	Kazakhstan	2	2
3	China	4	3
3	Hong Kong	3	4
5	Guam	5	6
5	Sri Lanka	6	5
