= 2012 ARFU Women's Sevens Championship =

- Host nation: India
- Date: 6–7 October 2012

Cup
- Champion: Fiji
- Runner-up: China
- Third: Japan

Tournament details
- Matches played: 42

The 2012 ARFU Women's Sevens Championship was the tournaments thirteenth edition and took place on 6 to 7 October 2012, at the Shree Shiv Chhatrapati Sports Complex in Pune, India. The tournament was a qualifier for the 2013 Rugby World Cup Sevens in Russia, there were three available spots at stake. Fiji qualified for the World Cup as champions, along with China and Japan who finished second and third respectively.

== Teams ==
15 teams competed in the competition, with 14 teams coming from Asia and one from Oceania. Fiji had earned a place at the qualifier by way of finishing third at the 2012 Oceania Women's Sevens Championship in August.

- China
- Chinese Taipei
- Fiji
- Hong Kong
- India
- Iran
- Japan
- Kazakhstan
- Malaysia
- Philippines
- Singapore
- South Korea
- Sri Lanka
- Thailand
- United Arab Emirates

== Pool stage ==
=== Pool A ===
Team	Pld	W	D	L	PF	PA	+/–	Pts
Japan	2	2	0	0	68	5	+63	6
Hong Kong	2	1	0	1	41	19	+22	4
India	2	0	0	2	0	85	–85	2

6 October 2012

Hong Kong	36–0	India

Pune

6 October 2012

Japan	49–0	India

Pune

6 October 2012

Japan	19–5	Hong Kong

Pune

=== Pool B ===
Team	Pld	W	D	L	PF	PA	+/–	Pts
Fiji	3	3	0	0	130	14	+116	9
Chinese Taipei	3	2	0	1	78	43	+35	7
Sri Lanka	3	1	0	2	57	70	–13	5
South Korea	3	0	0	3	0	138	–138	3

6 October 2012

Chinese Taipei	45–0	South Korea

Pune

6 October 2012

Fiji	44–7	Sri Lanka

Pune

6 October 2012

Chinese Taipei	26–7	Sri Lanka

Pune

6 October 2012

Fiji	50–0	South Korea

Pune

6 October 2012

South Korea	0–43	Sri Lanka

Pune

6 October 2012

Fiji	36–7	Chinese Taipei

Pune

=== Pool C ===
Team	Pld	W	D	L	PF	PA	+/–	Pts
China	3	3	0	0	119	0	+119	9
Thailand	3	2	0	1	76	48	+28	7
Philippines	3	1	0	2	47	67	–20	5
Malaysia	3	0	0	3	7	134	–127	3

6 October 2012

Thailand	45–0	Malaysia

Pune

6 October 2012

China	29–0	Philippines

Pune

6 October 2012

Thailand	31–7	Philippines

Pune

6 October 2012

China	49–0	Malaysia

Pune

6 October 2012

Malaysia	7–40	Philippines

Pune

6 October 2012

China	41–0	Thailand

Pune

=== Pool D ===
Team	Pld	W	D	L	PF	PA	+/–	Pts
Kazakhstan	3	3	0	0	108	0	+108	9
Singapore	3	2	0	1	39	46	–7	7
Iran	3	1	0	2	10	61	–51	5
United Arab Emirates	3	0	0	3	20	70	–50	3

6 October 2012

Singapore	20–0	Iran

Pune

6 October 2012

Kazakhstan	41–0	United Arab Emirates

Pune

6 October 2012

Singapore	19–15	United Arab Emirates

Pune

6 October 2012

Kazakhstan	36–0	Iran

Pune

6 October 2012

Iran	10–5	United Arab Emirates

Pune

6 October 2012

Kazakhstan	31–0	Singapore

Pune

== Knockout round ==
=== Shield ===
Semi-finals
7 October 2012
Malaysia	12
United Arab Emirates	17
7 October 2012
South Korea	BYE

Shield
7 October 2012
United Arab Emirates	24
South Korea	0

=== Bowl ===
Quarter-finals
7 October 2012
India	5
Malaysia	0
7 October 2012
Sri Lanka	20
United Arab Emirates	10
7 October 2012
Philippines	BYE
7 October 2012
Iran	29
South Korea	7

Bowl
7 October 2012
India	0
Sri Lanka	33
7 October 2012
Philippines	24
Iran	5

Final
7 October 2012
Sri Lanka	7
Philippines	22
Eleventh Place
7 October 2012
India	12
Iran	17

=== Plate ===
Semi-finals
7 October 2012
Thailand	17
Singapore	12
7 October 2012
Hong Kong	27
Chinese Taipei	0

Plate
7 October 2012
Thailand	7
Hong Kong	19
Seventh Place
7 October 2012
Singapore	12
Chinese Taipei	5

=== Cup ===
Quarter-finals
7 October 2012
Japan	12
Thailand	5
7 October 2012
Fiji	47
Singapore	0
7 October 2012
China	31
Hong Kong	0
7 October 2012
Kazakhstan	34
Chinese Taipei	0

Semi-finals
7 October 2012
Japan	7
Fiji	31
7 October 2012
China	17
Kazakhstan	12

Final
7 October 2012
Fiji	15
China	0
Third Place/Qualifier
7 October 2012
Japan	17
Kazakhstan	7
