= 2016 Asia Rugby Women's Sevens Series =

- Hosts: Hong Kong; South Korea; Sri Lanka
- Date: 2 September - 16 October

Final positions
- Champions: Japan
- Runners-up: China
- Third: Hong Kong

The 2016 Asia Rugby Women's Sevens Series is the seventeenth edition of Asia's continental sevens tournament for women. It was played over three legs hosted in Hong Kong, South Korea, and Sri Lanka.

== Hong Kong ==
The first leg was held at the Hong Kong Football Club Stadium.

Pool C

Teams	Pld	W	D	L	PF	PA	+/−	Pts
Japan	3	3	0	0	112	0	+112	9
Hong Kong	3	2	0	1	36	28	+8	6
Singapore	3	1	0	2	29	59	-30	5
Guam	3	0	0	3	7	97	-90	3

2 September 2016
12:44

Japan	45-0	Singapore

2 September 2016
13:06

Hong Kong	29-0	Guam

2 September 2016
15:40

Japan	39-0	Guam

2 September 2016
16:02

Hong Kong	7-0	Singapore

2 September 2016
18:36

Singapore	29-7	Guam

2 September 2016
18:58

Japan	28-0	Hong Kong

Pool D

Teams	Pld	W	D	L	PF	PA	+/−	Pts
China	3	3	0	0	132	0	+132	9
Thailand	3	2	0	1	58	43	+15	7
Sri Lanka	3	1	0	2	46	51	-5	5
Uzbekistan	3	0	0	3	0	142	-142	3

2 September 2016
12:00

China	59-0	Uzbekistan

2 September 2016
12:22

Thailand	14-7	Sri Lanka

2 September 2016
14:56

China	37-0	Sri Lanka

2 September 2016
15:18

Thailand	44-0	Uzbekistan

2 September 2016
17:52

Uzbekistan	0-39	Sri Lanka

2 September 2016
18:14

China	26-0	Thailand

Plate Semi-Finals

Semi-finals
3 September 2016 - 11:00
Singapore	27
Uzbekistan	0
3 September 2016 - 11:22
Guam	0
Sri Lanka	26

Final
3 September 2016 - 14:18
Singapore	10
Sri Lanka	7
Third place
3 September 2016 - 13:56
Uzbekistan	0
Guam	46

Cup Semi-Finals

Semi-finals
3 September 2016 - 11:44
Japan	43
Thailand	0
3 September 2016 - 12:06
Hong Kong	7
China	19

Final
3 September 2016 - 16:08
Japan	14
China	7
Third place
3 September - 14:40
Thailand	7
Hong Kong	36

Hong Kong Standings

Rank	Team
Gold medal	Japan
Silver medal	China
Bronze medal	Hong Kong
4	Thailand
5	Singapore
6	Sri Lanka
7	Guam
8	Uzbekistan

== Korea ==
The second leg was held at the Namdong Asiad Rugby Field.

Pool C

Teams	Pld	W	D	L	PF	PA	+/−	Pts
Japan	3	3	0	0	101	12	+89	9
Hong Kong	3	2	0	1	87	24	+63	7
Singapore	3	1	0	2	32	58	-26	5
Uzbekistan	3	0	0	3	0	126	-126	3

24 September 2016
11:44

Japan	34-0	Singapore

24 September 2016
12:06

Hong Kong	51-0	Uzbekistan

2 September 2016
14:40

Japan	43-0	Uzbekistan

2 September 2016
15:02

Hong Kong	24-0	Singapore

2 September 2016
17:36

Japan	24-12	Hong Kong

2 September 2016
17:58

Singapore	32-0	Uzbekistan

Pool D

Teams	Pld	W	D	L	PF	PA	+/−	Pts
China	3	3	0	0	150	5	+145	9
Thailand	3	2	0	1	41	76	-35	7
Guam	3	1	0	2	33	92	-59	5
South Korea	3	0	0	3	25	76	-51	3

24 September 2016
11:00

China	53-0	Guam

24 September 2016
11:22

Thailand	12-10	South Korea

24 September 2016
13:56

China	45-0	South Korea

24 September 2016
14:18

Thailand	24-14	Guam

24 September 2016
16:52

Guam	19-15	South Korea

24 September 2016
17:14

China	52-5	Thailand

Plate Semi-Finals

Semi-finals
25 September 2016 - 10:45
Singapore	26
South Korea	10
25 September 2016 - 11:07
Uzbekistan	0
Guam	42

Final
3 September 2016 - 14:11
Singapore	10
Guam	5
Third place
3 September 2016 - 13:49
South Korea	29
Uzbekistan	0

Cup Semi-Finals

Semi-finals
25 September 2016 - 11:29
Japan	29
Thailand	0
25 September 2016 - 11:51
Hong Kong	5
China	40

Final
3 September 2016 - 16:01
Japan	14
China	21
Third place
3 September - 14:33
Thailand	12
Hong Kong	27

Korea Standings

Rank	Team
Gold medal	China
Silver medal	Japan
Bronze medal	Hong Kong
4	Thailand
5	Singapore
6	Guam
7	South Korea
8	Uzbekistan

== Colombo ==
The third and final leg was held at the Race Course International Rugby Stadium.

Pool C

Teams	Pld	W	D	L	PF	PA	+/−	Pts
Hong Kong	3	3	0	0	62	24	+38	9
China	3	2	0	1	77	26	+51	7
Sri Lanka	3	1	0	2	27	49	-22	5
Singapore	3	0	0	3	12	79	-67	3

15 October 2016
11:44

China	38-7	Singapore

15 October 2016
12:06

Hong Kong	17-12	Sri Lanka

15 October 2016
14:40

China	27-0	Sri Lanka

15 October 2016
15:02

Hong Kong	26-0	Singapore

15 October 2016
17:36

China	12-19	Hong Kong

15 October 2016
17:58

Singapore	5-15	Sri Lanka

Pool D

Teams	Pld	W	D	L	PF	PA	+/−	Pts
Thailand	3	3	0	0	74	19	+45	9
Japan	3	2	0	1	98	24	+74	7
South Korea	3	1	0	2	38	55	-17	5
India	3	0	0	3	0	112	-112	3

15 October 2016
11:00

Japan	36-0	South Korea

15 October 2016
11:22

Thailand	31-0	India

15 October 2016
13:56

Japan	43-0	India

15 October 2016
14:18

Thailand	19-0	South Korea

15 October 2016
16:52

South Korea	38-0	India

15 October 2016
17:14

Japan	19-24	Thailand

Plate Semi-Finals

Semi-finals
16 October 2016 - 12:45
Sri Lanka	32
India	0
16 October 2016 - 13:07
Singapore	12
South Korea	7

Final
16 October 2016 - 16:11
Sri Lanka	7
Singapore	12
Third place
16 October 2016 - 15:49
India	5
South Korea	31

Cup Semi-Finals

Semi-finals
16 October 2016 - 13:29
Hong Kong	0
Japan	14
16 October 2016 - 13:51
China	29
Thailand	0

Final
16 October 2016 - 18:01
Japan	17
China	5
Third place
16 October - 16:33
Hong Kong	5
Thailand	19

Colombo Standings

Rank	Team
Gold medal	Japan
Silver medal	China
Bronze medal	Thailand
4	Hong Kong
5	Singapore
6	Sri Lanka
7	South Korea
8	India

== Final standings ==
Rank	Team	Hong Kong	Korea	Sri Lanka	Points
Gold medal	Japan	12	10	12	34
Silver medal	China	10	12	10	32
Bronze medal	Hong Kong	8	8	7	23
4	Thailand	7	7	8	22
5	Singapore	5	5	5	15
6	Sri Lanka	4	-	4	8
7	Guam	2	4	-	6
8	South Korea	-	2	2	4
9	Uzbekistan	1	1	-	2
10	India	-	-	1	1
