= Syria women's national rugby sevens team =

Syria
- Union: Syrian High Rugby Committee
- Nickname: Yasmines
- Ground: Al-Fayhaa Sports Complex
- Coach: Maria Carolina Bravo
- Captain: Sarah Abd Elbaki
Team kit	Change kit

First international
- Syria 5 – 5 Lebanon (25 April 2018)

World Cup Sevens
- Appearances: none

The Syrian women's national rugby sevens team is Syria's representative in women's rugby sevens. Syria competed at the 2021 Arab Rugby Sevens women's tournament. They placed fourth at the 2021 West Asia Rugby Women's Sevens.

== Honours ==
- West Asia Rugby Sevens Series

Fourth: 2021

- Arab Rugby Sevens Series

Runners-up: 2021

- Jordanian Rugby Sevens Tournament

Champions: 2022

== Tournament record ==
=== Asia Cup Sevens ===
West Asia Rugby Sevens Series
Year	Round	Position	P	W	L	D
(Qatar) 2021	Third playoff	4th	6	2	0	4
TBA	Qualified					
Total	0 Titles	1/1	6	2	0	4

=== Arab Cup Sevens ===
Arab Rugby Sevens Championship
Year	Round	Position	P	W	L	D
(Egypt) 2021	Finals	2nd place, silver medalist(s)	5	3	0	2
(Tunisia) 2022	Did not enter					
(United Arab Emirates) 2023	Finals	4th	6	2	3	1
Total	0 Titles	2/3	11	5	3	3

== Current squad ==
Squad to 2023 Arab Rugby Sevens Championships:

Syria's roster of 12 athletes was named on 17 February 2023.

- Head coach: Maria Carolina Bravo
- Assistant coach: Sarah Abd Elbaki
- Sarah Abd Elbaki
- Alyamama Abou Ras
- Lunar Al Samran
- Raneem Al Safadi
- Raghad Abo Ammar
- Doha Al Melhem
- Ruba Refaah
- Nicole Al Zrawi
- Hala Al Awar
- Neven Al Ghadban
- Alaa Saray Adleen
- Amal Nassr

== See also ==
- Rugby union in Syria
