= Arab Rugby Sevens Women's Championship =

International rugby sevens tournament

Arab Rugby 7s Women's Championship
- Current season or competition: 2025 Arab Rugby Sevens Women's Championship
- Sport: Rugby sevens
- Instituted: 2021
- Governing body: Arab World (ARF)
- Holders: Tunisia (2025)
- Most titles: Tunisia (4 titles)

The Arab Rugby Sevens Women's Championship (Arabic: البطولة العربية لسباعيات الرجبي للسيدات), is an annual rugby sevens tournament for women involving Arab nations, organised by the Arab Rugby Federation. It is contested on an annual basis.

== History ==
Since the 2024 edition, the name of the competition changed from Tournament to Championship.

== Results by year ==
Year	Host	Final			Third place match		
Year	Host	Winner	Score	Runner-up	Third	Score	Fourth
2021	Alexandria, Egypt	Egypt	31–0	Syria	United Arab Emirates	5–0	Lebanon
2022	Tunis, Tunisia	Tunisia	49–5	Egypt	United Arab Emirates	17–5	Algeria
2023	Al Ain, United Arab Emirates	Tunisia	24–5	United Arab Emirates	Egypt	10–7	Syria
2024	Taif, Saudi Arabia	Tunisia	33–5	United Arab Emirates	Egypt	34–0	Syria
2025	Alexandria, Egypt	Tunisia	38–0	Egypt	United Arab Emirates	34–0	Lebanon
2026	..., Egypt	Futur event					

== Team Records ==
Team	Champions	Runners-up	Third	Fourth
Tunisia	4 (2022*, 2023, 2024, 2025)	–	1 (2023)	–
Egypt	1 (2021*)	2 (2022, 2025*)	2 (2023, 2024)	–
United Arab Emirates	–	2 (2023*, 2024)	3 (2021, 2022, 2025)	–
Syria	–	1 (2021)	–	2 (2023, 2024)
Lebanon	–	–	–	2 (2021, 2025)
Algeria	–	–	–	1 (2022)

* hosts
Updated to 2022

== National team appearances in the Arab Rugby Sevens Championship ==
Team	(Egypt) 2021	(Tunisia) 2022	(United Arab Emirates) 2023	(Saudi Arabia) 2024	(Egypt) 2025	(Egypt) 2026	Apps.
Africa
Algeria		4th					1
Egypt	1st	2nd	3rd	3rd	2nd	Q	5
Libya			6th	7th			2
Tunisia		1st	1st	1st	1st		4
Asia
Jordan			5th	6th	5th		3
Lebanon	4th			5th	4th		3
Saudi Arabia				8th	6th		2
Syria	2nd		4th	4th			2
United Arab Emirates	3rd	3rd	2nd	2nd	3rd		5
Team	4	4	6	8	6		

- R1 — Round 1 (pool stage)
- Q — Qualified
- •• — Invited but declined or qualified but withdrew
- • — Did not qualify
- × — Expelled after qualification/Disqualified
- — Did not enter or withdrew from qualifying
- — Hosts

== Results ==
=== 2021 ===
Source:

=== 2022 ===
Source:

=== 2023 ===
Source:

=== 2024 ===
First phase

16/02/2024 Syria Women 7s - Jordan Women 7s 12-5

16/02/2024 Tunisia Women 7s - Saudi Arabia Women 7s 69-0

16/02/2024 Tunisia Women 7s - Jordan Women 7s 38-0

16/02/2024 Syria Women 7s - Saudi Arabia Women 7s 39-0

16/02/2024 Tunisia Women 7s - Syria Women 7s 52-0

16/02/2024 Jordan Women 7s - Saudi Arabia Women 7s 48-0

16/02/2024 Egypt Women 7s - Libya Women 7s 32-0

16/02/2024 United Arab Emirates Women 7s - Lebanon Women 7s 29-0

16/02/2024 Egypt Women 7s - Lebanon Women 7s 34-5

16/02/2024 United Arab Emirates Women 7s - Libya Women 7s 26-0

16/02/2024 Lebanon Women 7s - Libya Women 7s 34-0

16/02/2024 United Arab Emirates Women 7s - Egypt Women 7s 17-12

== See also ==
- Arab Rugby Sevens Men's Championship
- Africa Women's Sevens
- Asia Rugby Women's Sevens Series
