= 2017 Asia Rugby Women's Sevens Series =

- Hosts: Laos (Trophy); South Korea; Sri Lanka
- Date: 23 September - 15 October

The 2017 Asia Rugby Women's Sevens Series is the eighteenth edition of Asia's continental sevens tournament for women. The lower tier Trophy, which serves as a qualifier for the series, was held in Laos. The Series will be played over two legs hosted in South Korea and Sri Lanka. The 2017 edition of the series serves as qualification to the 2018 Rugby World Cup Sevens, with the top two qualifying.

== Teams ==
Asia Rugby Sevens Trophy

- India
- Laos
- Malaysia
- Nepal
- Pakistan
- Philippines
- South Korea

Asia Rugby Sevens Series

- China
- Hong Kong
- Japan
- Singapore
- Sri Lanka
- Thailand
- South Korea
- Kazakhstan

== Trophy ==
The women's Trophy was a single round robin held over 17–18 February at Laos National Stadium in Vientiane, Laos.

Legend
Advances to Asia Rugby Women's Sevens Series

Table

Teams	Pld	W	D	L	PF	PA	+/−	Pts
South Korea	6	6	0	0	178	10	+168	18
India	6	5	0	1	108	53	+55	16
Malaysia	6	4	0	2	142	46	+96	14
Philippines	6	3	0	3	116	56	+60	12
Laos	6	2	0	4	104	119	-15	10
Pakistan	6	1	0	5	22	179	-157	8
Nepal	6	0	0	6	7	204	-197	6

Matches

17 Feb
10:30

South Korea	48-0	Pakistan

17 Feb
10:52

Laos	7-20	India

17 Feb
11:14

Malaysia	10-5	Philippines

17 Feb
13:04

South Korea	34-0	Nepal

17 Feb
13:26

Laos	36-5	Pakistan

17 Feb
13:48

Philippines	5-12	India

17 Feb
15:38

South Korea	10-0	Malaysia

17 Feb
16:00

India	43-0	Nepal

17 Feb
16:22

Philippines	31-22	Laos

17 Feb
18:12

South Korea	22-5	Philippines

17 Feb
18:34

India	24-12	Malaysia

17 Feb
18:56

Pakistan	17-7	Nepal

18 Feb
11:24

Pakistan	0-5	India

18 Feb
11:46

Nepal	0-27	Philippines

18 Feb
12:08

Laos	5-26	Malaysia

18 Feb
13:52

Philippines	43-0	Pakistan

18 Feb
14:14

South Korea	35-5	Laos

18 Feb
14:36

Malaysia	54-0	Nepal

18 Feb
16:26

Pakistan	0-40	Malaysia

18 Feb
16:48

Nepal	0-29	Laos

18 Feb
17:10

South Korea	29-0	India

== Series ==
=== South Korea ===
Will be held 23–24 September All matches will be held at Namdong Asiad Stadium in Incheon. All times are Korea Standard Time(UTC+9).

Event	Winners	Score	Finalists	Semifinalists
Cup	Japan	19−14	China	Kazakhstan; Hong Kong
Plate	Sri Lanka	24−12	Thailand	Singapore; South Korea

Pool A

Teams	Pld	W	D	L	PF	PA	+/−	Pts
Japan	3	3	0	0	96	20	+76	9
Kazakhstan	3	2	0	1	74	29	+45	7
Thailand	3	1	0	2	36	70	−34	5
Singapore	3	0	0	3	12	99	−87	3

Matches

23 September 2017
12:12

Japan	45−0	Singapore

23 September 2017
12:34

Thailand	5−31	Kazakhstan

23 September 2017
15:08

Japan	17−15	Kazakhstan

23 September 2017
15:30

Thailand	26−5	Singapore

23 September 2017
18:04

Japan	34−5	Thailand

23 September 2017
18:26

Singapore	7−28	Kazakhstan

Pool B

Teams	Pld	W	D	L	PF	PA	+/−	Pts
China	3	3	0	0	97	12	+85	9
Hong Kong	3	2	0	1	66	22	+44	7
Sri Lanka	3	1	0	2	29	71	−42	5
South Korea	3	0	0	3	7	94	−87	3

Matches

23 September 2017
11:28

China	36−12	Sri Lanka

23 September 2017
11:50

Hong Kong	38−0	South Korea

23 September 2017
14:24

China	39−0	South Korea

23 September 2017
14:46

Hong Kong	28−0	Sri Lanka

23 September 2017
17:20

Sri Lanka	17−7	South Korea

23 September 2017
17:42

China	22−0	Hong Kong

Cup

Quarter-finals
24 September 2017 10:00
Thailand	15
Hong Kong	19
24 September 2017 10:22
Japan	53
South Korea	0
24 September 2017 10:44
Singapore	0
China	31
24 September 2017 11:06
Kazakhstan	27
Sri Lanka	7

Semi-finals
24 September 2017 13:36
Hong Kong	0
Japan	28
24 September 2017 13:58
China	17
Kazakhstan	14

Final
24 September 2017 18:04
Japan	19
China	14
Third place
24 September 2017 17:20
Hong Kong	7
Kazakhstan	24

Plate

Semi-finals
24 September 2017 12:52
Thailand	26
South Korea	7
24 September 2017 13:14
Singapore	15
Sri Lanka	19

Final
24 September 2017 16:14
Thailand	12
Sri Lanka	24
Seventh Place
24 September 2017 15:52
South Korea	12
Singapore	17

=== Sri Lanka ===
Will be held 14–15 October. All matches will be held at Racecourse International Rugby Stadium in Colombo. All times are Sri Lanka Standard Time(UTC+5:30).

Event	Winners	Score	Finalists	Semifinalists
Cup	Japan	10−5	China	Kazakhstan; Thailand
Plate	Hong Kong	12−5	Sri Lanka	Singapore; South Korea

Pool A

Teams	Pld	W	D	L	PF	PA	+/−	Pts
Japan	3	3	0	0	79	12	+67	9
Hong Kong	3	2	0	1	53	22	+31	6
Sri Lanka	3	1	0	2	41	29	+12	2
South Korea	3	0	0	3	0	110	−110	3

Matches

14 October 2017
11:58

Japan	19−7	Sri Lanka

14 October 2017
12:20

Hong Kong	38−0	South Korea

14 October 2017
14:54

Japan	43−0	South Korea

14 October 2017
15:16

Hong Kong	10−5	Sri Lanka

14 October 2017
17:56

Sri Lanka	29−0	South Korea

14 October 2017
18:18

Japan	17−5	Hong Kong

Pool B

Teams	Pld	W	D	L	PF	PA	+/−	Pts
China	3	3	0	0	73	19	+54	9
Kazakhstan	3	2	0	1	68	26	+42	7
Thailand	3	1	0	2	50	60	−10	5
Singapore	3	0	0	3	5	91	−86	3

Matches

14 October 2017
12:42

China	28−14	Thailand

14 October 2017
13:04

Kazakhstan	36−0	Singapore

14 October 2017
15:38

China	24−0	Singapore

14 October 2017
16:00

Kazakhstan	27−5	Thailand

14 October 2017
18:40

China	21−5	Kazakhstan

14 October 2017
19:02

Thailand	31−5	Singapore

Cup

Quarter-finals
15 October 2017 − 10:00
Sri Lanka	0
Kazakhstan	12
15 October 2017 − 10:22
Japan	27
Singapore	0
15 October 2017 − 10:44
South Korea	0
China	34
15 October 2017 − 11:06
Hong Kong	7
Thailand	12

Semi-finals
15 October 2017 − 13:36
Kazakhstan	10
Japan	12
15 October 2017 − 13:58
China	15
Thailand	12

Final
15 October 2017 − 18:36
Japan	10
China	5
Third place
15 October 2017 − 17:46
Kazakhstan	22
Thailand	5

Plate

Semi-finals
15 October 2017 − 12:52
Sri Lanka	34
Singapore	5
15 October 2017 − 13:14
South Korea	0
Hong Kong	29

Final
15 October 2017 − 16:40
Sri Lanka	5
Hong Kong	12
Seventh Place
15 October 2017 − 16:18
Singapore	15
South Korea	0

== Standings ==
Legend
Qualified to 2018 Rugby World Cup Sevens

Rank	Team	Korea	Sri Lanka	Points
1	Japan	12	12	24
2	China	10	10	20
3	Kazakhstan	8	8	16
4	Hong Kong	7	5	12
5	Thailand	4	7	11
6	Sri Lanka	5	4	9
7	Singapore	2	2	4
8	South Korea	1	1	2

== See also ==
- 2018 Rugby World Cup Sevens qualifying – Women
- 2017 Asia Rugby Sevens Series (men)
