= Syrian High Rugby Committee =

Governing body for rugby union in Syria

اللجنة السورية العليا للريكبي
- Sport: Rugby union
- Founded: 2012
- World Rugby affiliation: 2022 (associate)
- Asia Rugby affiliation: 2015
- President: Ahmad Madani
- Women's coach: Sarah Abd Elbaki
- Website: Official page

The Syrian High Rugby Committee (Arabic: اللجنة السورية العليا للريكبي) is the governing body for rugby union in Syria. It was founded in March 2012 and sent teams to the Arabian 7s Challenge Cup in 2017. Syrian High Rugby Committee was fully affiliated to Asia Rugby in 2015, and became an associate member of World Rugby in 2022. Its headquarters is in Al-Fayhaa Sports Complex, Damascus.

== History ==
In 2008, Syrian team reached the final of the Gulf Men Cup. This led to an increase in number of players which managed in the final to win the Gulf Men Open in Dubai Rugby in 2011.

This events gave the Syrian Sport Council inspiration to form the Syrian High Rugby Committee in March 2012, the SHRC has worked on the players recruitment, and succeeded in forming clubs and join Asia Rugby in order to participate in Asian Rugby Tournaments.

== Teams ==
Men's

- Syria national rugby sevens team

Women's

- Syria women's national rugby sevens team

== Competitions ==
The Syrian Rugby League Championship has been run by the General Sports Federation since 2012.

As of 2022, the league comprised five teams: Zenobians (formed in 2004), IUST Palmerians (2015), AIU Alphas (2015), Victory (2012), and Titans.

== See also ==
- Rugby union in Syria
