= Rugby union in Lebanon =

- Country: Lebanon
- Governing body: Lebanese Rugby Union Federation
- National team: Lebanon
- Nickname: Phoenix
- First played: 1995
- Registered players: 200
- Clubs: 6

National competitions
- Rugby World Cup; Asian Five Nations

Rugby union was first introduced into Lebanon both by the mandated French forces, and subsequently by the Lebanese returning from the diaspora. Introduced into other parts of the Middle East, by the British military in the mid 20th Century, rugby has begun to develop across the Arabian peninsula.

In 2009, the Lebanese Rugby Union Federation was established with the intention of developing the game at a local level and representing Lebanon on the international rugby scene. The Federation was formed by representatives of the Beirut Phoenicians, Ahed/Reay, Jamhour Black Lions and Grey Wolves Rugby Clubs. In 2013, the Jounieh Rugby Club was formed and applied to join the LRUF. During this period the Lebanese Rugby Union Federation was recognised as a member of the Asian Rugby Federation Union.

== The Current State of Lebanese Rugby Union ==
The Lebanese Rugby Union Federation at the present time is made up of six teams, which play in domestic tournaments including,

- The Blue Stars
- The Beirut Phoenicians
- The Jamhour Black Lions
- The Jounieh Dragons
- The Froggies Beyrouth

It is from these clubs that players are selected to play for the Lebanese National team, which is often supplemented by expatriate Lebanese players from nations with large Lebanese expatriate communities with an interest in Rugby such as England and Australia. The Lebanese National team competes in the Asian Rugby Federation Union competition.

== Domestically ==
=== Lebanese Club Championship ===
The Lebanese Rugby Union Federation's representative side, "Phoenix Select XV" competes in rugby matches against visiting United Nations Interim Force troop teams including teams from the French, Irish and Fijian battalions stationed in Southern Lebanon.

=== Internationally ===
The Lebanese National Rugby Union Team, the "Phoenix" has participated in international tournaments and test matches since the inception of the Federation in 2009.

=== Lebanese Expatriate Rugby Participation ===
The Australian Lebanese community has had a long and proud association with the game of rugby union commencing within a short period of time after the establishment of the Syrian (Lebanese) colony in Australia. In 1888, George P Barbour was selected to represent the New South Wales Waratahs against Queensland and from 1894 to 1897 All (Alf) Hanna played 16 Caps for the Waratahs.

Undoubtedly, the most distinguished of all rugby players of Australian Lebanese descent is former Australian Wallabies Captain and President of the Australian Rugby Football Union (ARU), Sir Nicholas Shehadie AC. OBE. Sir Nicholas began playing at the age of 15 and played more than 175 club games for the famous 'Galloping Greens', the Randwick Rugby Club.

His career eventually spanned almost five decades representing the Waratahs with 37 caps and by age 20, Sir Nicholas was selected to represent Australia against the New Zealand All Blacks in the Second Test at the Sydney Cricket Ground in 1947.

While not being able to definitively single out a greatest career highlight, Sir Nicholas remembers with great fondness his selection in the nine-month tour of the United Kingdom, France and North America in 1947/48. Eventually playing more than 100 games for the Wallabies, Sir Nicholas captained Australia three times. The Australian Rugby Union still considers him to be "one of the world's best props, Sir Nicholas Shehadie set a new Australian record for being the most capped Wallaby, with 30 Tests to his name between 1947 and 1958."

Sir Nicholas was selected to tour Europe with the Wallabies in 1958, ten years after his previous tour. At the end of the tour, he was selected to represent the prestigious Barbarian Football Club against his beloved Wallabies. Neither feat had ever been accomplished by any other player. His illustrious rugby career did not end with his playing retirement. He went on to become the President of the Australian Rugby Football Union from 1980 to 1986 and was instrumental in establishing the inaugural Rugby World Cup, which is now the third largest sporting event after the Olympics and the Football World Cup. Sir Nicholas was inducted into the ARU Hall of Fame in 2006 and the International Rugby Board's Hall of Fame in 2011.

During Sir Nicholas' era there were a number of Australians of Lebanese descent playing rugby union at grade or state level. Nick Aboud played 1 cap for the Waratahs in 1935 and Sir Nicholas' brother, George Shehadie played for the Eastern Suburbs Rugby Club. George went on to be selected for the Waratahs for 3 caps in 1960.

While Manager of the 1981 Australian Wallabies tour of the United Kingdom, Sir Nicholas had the regrettable honour of having to farewell Wallabies' Hooker, Bruce Malouf who unfortunately broke his ankle at a training session four days after arriving in the UK.

Current New South Wales Waratahs Head Coach, Michael Cheika played more than 300 games for the Randwick Rugby Club, captaining Randwick from 1997 to 1999 winning seven Shute Shield Premierships. He represented Australia in the Under 20s and played three games for the Waratahs in 1997. Michael made a successful transition into coaching winning the European Championship with Leinster Rugby Union Club. Michael Cheika played for Randwick against the World Champion All Blacks at Coogee Oval in 1988, the only domestic Australian Club to play an international team in the 20th century.

Yet it is not just the New South Welshmen of Lebanese descent who have represented at the highest levels of rugby union. Queenslanders have a fierce reputation for being hard-hitting and powerful rugby players with Brendan Nasser being no exception. Playing in the position of flanker, Brendan had an illustrious rugby career with Queensland from 1986 to 1992 before being selected to represent Australia as a Wallaby in 1989/90. Brendan played eight Test matches for the Wallabies and was a member of the 1991 World Cup winning squad. In 1992, his final year of international representative rugby, Brendan was selected to play in a World XV against New Zealand to celebrate the All Blacks' Centenary of Rugby.

Many younger players of Lebanese descent have represented Australia at an international Schoolboy level including David Azar, Nicholas Ghattas, David Basha, Robert Shehadie and Anthony Nehme.

Other players of Lebanese origin that have played at an international level of Rugby include New Zealand All Black, Joe Karam. An extremely hard trainer at a club level, Karam was named as an All Black for the 1972–73 tour of the British Isles and France. He played 10 test matches for the All Blacks between 1972 and 1975. Joe Karam was inducted into the Lebanese Rugby Union Federation's Hall of Fame in a ceremony in 2013 for his contribution to international rugby. Omar Hasan, who is Lebanese, phase been voted as the best tighthead prop by world rugby

== See also ==
- Lebanon national rugby union team
- Rugby union in Syria, neighbouring country in a similar situation.
