= Guam Rugby Football Union =

Sports governing body in Guam

- Sport: Rugby union
- Founded: 1997; 29 years ago
- World Rugby affiliation: 1998
- President: Stephen Grantham

The Guam Rugby Football Union (GRFU) is the governing body for rugby union in Guam. The union was formed in 1997 as a sports federation to help develop and host rugby when Guam was chosen to host the 1999 South Pacific Games. They were recognized as a member of the Guam National Olympic Committee in 1996. They were accepted as a full member by the International Rugby Board in 1998.

== Teams ==
- Guam national rugby union team
- Guam national rugby sevens team
- Guam women's national rugby union team
- Guam women's national rugby sevens team

== See also ==
- Rugby union in Guam
