= Rugby union in Syria =

- Country: Syria
- Governing body: Syrian High Rugby Committee
- National team: Syria
- Nickname: Eagles
- First played: 1982
- Registered players: 200
- Clubs: 5

Club competitions
- Syrian Rugby Championship

International competitions
- Asia Rugby Championship; Asia Rugby Women's Championship; Asia Rugby Sevens Series; Asia Rugby Women's Sevens Series; West Asian Sevens

Rugby union in Syria is a minor but growing sport. Rugby was first introduced to the country by French and British forces, as well as by Syrian expatriates returning from the diaspora.

== History ==
Rugby was played in Syria under a French mandate when it was brought to the country by Allied troops after the 1941 invasion.

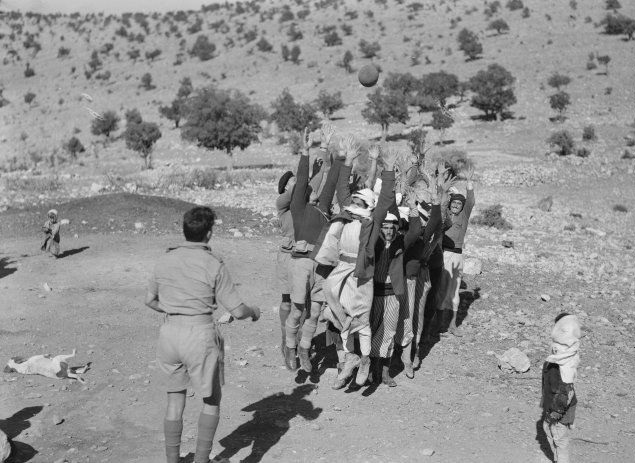
Rugby match between Syrian villagers and New Zealand Army soldiers in 1942

Touch rugby was played in Damascus since 1982.

Rugby union was introduced to Syria by the French and the British in 2004, started to grow by inviting the Syrians to play and join the team to participate in region tournaments in the Middle East.

The Syrian High Rugby Committee was formed by the Syrian Sports Council in March 2012 and as the President of the Syrian Committee was appointed Ahmad Madani, although rugby has been played in the country for a longer period of time. Syrian Rugby became a member of Asia Rugby in May 2015. The SHRC was accepted as associated member of World Rugby in November 2022.

== Competitions ==
The Syrian Rugby League Championship has been run by the General Sports Federation since 2012.

As of 2021, the league comprised five teams: Zenobians (formed in 2004), IUST Palmerians (2015), AIU Alphas (2015), Victory (2012), and Titans.

== See also ==
- Syria women's national rugby sevens team
- Sarah Abd Elbaki
