= Lebanese Rugby Union Federation =

Sports governing body in Lebanon

- Sport: Rugby union
- Founded: 2009
- World Rugby affiliation: 2018 (associate)
- Asia affiliation: 2009 (associate); 2012 (member)

The Lebanese Rugby Union Federation, a national sports association based in Beirut, is the governing body for rugby union in Lebanon. The origins of the game in the country date back to at least 1995 with the formation of the Beirut Phoenicians club, but it was not until 2005 that the Lebanese Ministry of Sport officially recognized it as a sport. Lebanon became an associate member of the now-defunct Arabian Gulf Rugby Football Union in 2007, before joining the ARFU (now known as Asia Rugby) as an associate member in December 2009. It attained full membership in Asia by 2013, and associate status with World Rugby in 2018.

It administers all aspects of the game in Lebanon, both 15-a-side and 7-a-side, among men and women of all age groups in the country. This includes managing the Lebanese national teams as well as training players, including children and youth.

== Teams ==
Men's

- Lebanon national rugby union team

== See also ==
- Rugby union in Lebanon
