= Rugby union in Guam =

- Country: Guam
- Governing body: Guam Rugby Football Union
- National team: Guam
- Registered players: 527 (124 teenage)
- Clubs: 4

Rugby union in Guam is a minor but growing sport. They are currently ranked 82nd by the IRB. Although Guam is often considered part of Oceania, it tends to take part in Asian rugby tournaments.

The governing body is the Guam Rugby Football Union.

== History ==
Rugby came to Guam via three separate streams, firstly, through the visits of British, New Zealand and Australian sailors; secondly, through the American presence, which has been there from the turn of the twentieth century; and thirdly through contact with neighbouring Pacific islands, where the game is popular. Guam has also had a long running, but sometimes tempestuous, relationship with Japan. It is not known if the forces of the Japanese occupation in WWII played the game at all there, but certainly, a large number Japanese retirees have also taken an interest in promoting the game.

Modern rugby in Guam, really dates from the 1970s, however.

In 1995, Guam Rugby Club was established, and they undertook tours to Saipan (Marianas), Palau, Pohnpei (Micronesia), and continental Asia.

Guam rugby received another boost in 1999, when the island was chosen to host the 1999 South Pacific Games (SPG); rugby sevens had only been approved as an official sport the previous year.

In 2003, a full-time development officer was employed, and in 2004, the game was officially introduced into schools.

The main rugby ground is the Wettengel Football Field.

== National team ==
Guam takes part in the Pacific Asia region of the Asian Five Nations.

== See also ==
- Guam national rugby union team
- Guam national rugby sevens team
- Guam women's national rugby union team
- Guam women's national rugby sevens team
- Rugby union in the United States
