= Sarah Abd Elbaki =

Syrian rugby player, coach and referee (born c. 1997)

Sarah Abd Elbaki (born 1 February 1997) is a Syrian rugby player, coach and referee. Captain of the Syrian women's team, Abd Elbaki is "an influential figure in women's rugby in the Arab world".

Abd Elbaki started playing rugby in 2017. In 2020 she became the first woman to referee a domestic 15s match. She is also an assistant coach for the Syrian men's rugby team. In March 2021 she was named as one of 12 recipients of the 2021 World Rugby Women's Executive Leadership Scholarship.
