= 2021 Asia Rugby Women's Sevens Series =

- Hosts: Lebanon (Trophy); Uzbekistan (Trophy); Thailand (Trophy); UAE
- Date: 10 September – 26 November

The 2021 Asia Rugby Women's Sevens Series was hosted as two tournament events in the United Arab Emirates in late November 2021. Following the cancellation of the 2020 series due to impacts of the COVID-19 pandemic, it was the twelfth edition of Asia's continental sevens circuit. The first leg of the tournament was a qualifier for the 2022 Rugby World Cup Sevens in South Africa. Japan and China qualified for the World Cup.

The lower-tier Trophy tournaments, hosted in Lebanon, Uzbekistan and Thailand served as qualifiers, with the winners eligible to compete in the main series.

== Teams ==
8 teams competed in the main series.

- Japan
- Kazakhstan
- Thailand
- Philippines
- China
- Hong Kong
- Sri Lanka
- Malaysia

== Schedule ==
Incheon, Huizhou and Colombo were originally scheduled as legs of the 2021 series, but all were eventually cancelled due to impacts of the COVID-19 pandemic and replaced by two events in the United Arab Emirates. The official schedule for the 2021 Asia Rugby Women's Sevens Series is:

2021 Women's Sevens Series schedule
Leg	Stadium	City	Dates	Winner	Runner-up
UAE	Dubai	Dubai	19–20 November 2021	Japan	China

== Standings ==
Legend
Qualified to 2022 Rugby World Cup Sevens
Relegated for 2022 Series

Rank	Team	Dubai	Points
1st place, gold medalist(s)	Japan	12	12
2nd place, silver medalist(s)	China	10	10
3rd place, bronze medalist(s)	Hong Kong	8	8
4	Kazakhstan	7	7
5	Thailand	4	4
6	Sri Lanka	3	3
7	Malaysia	2	2
8	Philippines	1	1

== Tournaments ==
=== Dubai ===
The Tournament was held from the 19 to 20 November in Dubai.

==== Pool stage ====
Legend
Advances to Cup
Advances to Plate

Pool A
Teams	Pld	W	D	L	PF	PA	+/-	Pts
Japan	3	3	0	0	99	12	87	9
Kazakhstan	3	1	1	1	60	26	34	6
Thailand	3	1	1	1	45	27	18	6
Philippines	3	0	0	3	5	144	-139	3

19 Nov

Japan	21 - 7	Kazakhstan

19 Nov

Thailand	35 - 5	Philippines

19 Nov

Japan	17 - 5	Thailand

19 Nov

Kazakhstan	48 - 0	Philippines

19 Nov

Japan	61 - 0	Philippines

19 Nov

Kazakhstan	5 - 5	Thailand

Pool B
Teams	Pld	W	D	L	PF	PA	+/-	Pts
China	3	3	0	0	114	15	99	9
Hong Kong	3	2	0	1	97	32	65	7
Sri Lanka	3	1	0	2	17	95	-78	5
Malaysia	3	0	0	3	25	111	-86	3

19 Nov

China	22 - 5	Hong Kong

19 Nov

Sri Lanka	12 - 10	Malaysia

19 Nov

China	47 - 0	Sri Lanka

19 Nov

Hong Kong	54 - 5	Malaysia

19 Nov

China	45 - 10	Malaysia

19 Nov

Hong Kong	38 - 5	Sri Lanka

==== Knockout stage ====
Plate

Semi-finals
20 Nov
Thailand	22
Malaysia	0
20 Nov
Philippines	15
Sri Lanka	19

Plate Final
20 Nov
Thailand	45
Sri Lanka	0
Seventh place
20 Nov
Malaysia	12
Philippines	0

Cup

Semi-finals
20 Nov
Japan	29
Hong Kong	0
20 Nov
Kazakhstan	19
China	24

Cup Final
20 Nov
Japan	14
China	12
Third place
20 Nov
Hong Kong	12
Kazakhstan	10

== Trophy ==
The women's trophy events were supposed to be held in three places. The Trophy events scheduled for Central and South Asia, and, East and South East Asia appear to have been cancelled.

=== Trophy West Asia ===
Leg	City	Date	Winner	Runner-up	Third	Ref
Qatar	Doha	8-9 October 2021	United Arab Emirates	Qatar	Iran	

Round-robin

Team	P	W	D	L	PF	PA	PD	Pts
United Arab Emirates	4	3	1	0	131	19	+112	11
Qatar	4	3	0	1	85	41	+44	10
Syria	4	2	0	2	69	59	+10	8
Iran	4	1	1	2	37	31	+6	7
Iraq	4	0	4	0	7	176	−169	4

Round 1

8 October 2021
16:00

Syria	7-40	United Arab Emirates

Doha

8 October 2021
16:20

Iraq	7-54	Qatar

Doha

Round 2

8 October 2021
17:20

Syria	14-7	Iran

Doha

8 October 2021
17:40

United Arab Emirates	59-0	Iraq

Doha

Round 3

8 October 2021
18:40

Syria	5-12	Qatar

Doha

8 October 2021
19:00

United Arab Emirates	5–5	Iran

Doha

Round 4

8 October 2021
20:00

Syria	43-0	Iraq

Doha

8 October 2021
20:20

Qatar	12-5	Iran

Doha

Round 5

9 October 2021
16:40

Iraq	0-20	Iran

Doha

9 October 2021
17:00

United Arab Emirates	27-7	Qatar

Doha

== See also ==
- 2021 Asia Rugby Sevens Series (for men)
