= India women's national rugby sevens team =

India Women's Sevens
- Union: Rugby India
- Coach: Paul Delport
- Captain: Shikha Yadav

India women's national rugby sevens team
Medal record

Asia Rugby Sevens Trophy
Silver medal – second place	2017 Laos	
Silver medal – second place	2019 Indonesia	
Silver medal – second place	2022 Indonesia	
Silver medal – second place	2023 Qatar	
Silver medal – second place	2024 Nepal	

The India women's national sevens rugby union team is India's national representative in Rugby sevens.

== History ==
Sevens was first played in India in 1886 at the Khajjiar Gymkhana.

They played their first international sevens rugby at the 2010 Asian Games in Guangzhou, China, where they finished seventh. India competed at the 2019 Asia Rugby Women's Sevens Series in the Trophy division and placed second overall.

India were runners-up at the 2023 Asia Rugby Sevens Trophy tournament in Dubai. They finished as runners up again in the same competition in 2024 this time held in Kathmandu.

=== Previous squad ===
Squad to Squad at 2010 Asian Games

- Sitara Indramohan
- V. Boman Bharucha
- Niharika Bal
- Bhagyalaxmi Barik
- Neha Pardeshi
- Surabhi Date
- Tapasi Nandi
- Sutapa Das
- Kalpana Das
- Sheetal Maurya
- Annapurna Bothate
- Yogita Marathe

== Tournament history ==
=== CASA Sevens ===
CASA Sevens record
Year	Result	Position	Pld	W	L	Ref
(Uzbekistan) 2026	3rd place match	4th	6	3	3	

=== Asian Games ===
Asian Games
Year	Position	P	W	L	D	PF	PA	PD
(China) 2010	7th	6	1	5	0	26	206	-180
(South Korea) 2014	Did not compete							
(Indonesia) 2018	Did not compete							
(China) 2022	7th	4	0	4	0	7	122	-115
(Japan) 2026	6th	5	2	0	3	60	106	-46
Total	3/5	15	3	12	0	93	434	-341

=== Asian Rugby Sevens Trophy ===
Asia Rugby Women’s Sevens Trophy
Year	Position	P	W	L	D	PF	PA	PD
(Laos) 2017	2nd	6	5	1	0	108	53	+55
(Brunei) 2018	5th	6	4	2	0	164	37	+127
(Indonesia) 2019	2nd	4	3	1	0	96	50	+46
(Qatar) 2021	Did not compete							
(Indonesia) 2022	2nd	5	4	1	0	108	50	+58
(Qatar) 2023	2nd	4	3	1	0	89	33	+56
(Nepal) 2024	2nd	5	4	1	0	95	34	+61
Total	6/7	30	23	7	0	660	257	+403

Won	Lost

2017 Asia Rugby Sevens Trophy
Date	Location	Opposition	Score	Result
17 February	Laos	Laos	22–7	Win
17 February	Laos	Philippines	12–5	Win
17 February	Laos	Nepal	43–0	Win
17 February	Laos	Malaysia	26–12	Win
18 February	Laos	Pakistan	5–0	Win
18 February	Laos	South Korea	0–29	Loss

2018 Asia Rugby Sevens Trophy
Date	Location	Opposition	Score	Result
20 October	Brunei	Uzbekistan	5–10	Loss
20 October	Brunei	Nepal	43–0	Win
20 October	Brunei	Philippines	12–17	Loss
21 October	Brunei	Pakistan	43–0	Win
21 October	Brunei	Indonesia	30–0	Win
21 October	Brunei	Laos	31–10	Win

2019 Asia Rugby Sevens Trophy
Date	Location	Opposition	Score	Result
10 August	Indonesia	Chinese Taipei	34–0	Win
10 August	Indonesia	Guam	29–14	Win
11 August	Indonesia	Philippines	12–19	Loss
11 August	Indonesia	Indonesia	21–17	Win

2022 Asia Rugby Sevens Trophy
Date	Location	Opposition	Score	Result
6 August	Jakarta	Mongolia	39–0	Win
6 August	Jakarta	Guam	26–21	Win
6 August	Jakarta	Iran	21–0	Win
7 August	Jakarta	Indonesia	17–12	Win
7 August	Jakarta	Singapore	5–17	Loss

2023 Asia Rugby Sevens Trophy
Date	Location	Opposition	Score	Result
3 November	Doha	Mongolia	36–0	Win
3 November	Doha	Guam	14–7	Win
4 November	Doha	Iran	34–0	Win
4 November	Doha	United Arab Emirates	5–26	Loss

2024 Asia Rugby Sevens Trophy
Date	Location	Opposition	Score	Result
4 October	Nepal	Sri Lanka	29–10	Win
4 October	Nepal	Indonesia	17–10	Win
4 October	Nepal	Iran	20–0	Win
5 October	Nepal	Guam	24–7	Win
5 October	Nepal	Philippines	5–7	Loss
