= Iran women's national rugby sevens team =

Iran
- Union: Iran Rugby Federation
Team kit

The Iran women's national rugby union sevens team represents Iran in women's rugby sevens. They participated at the Asia Rugby Sevens Women's Trophy 2021 in Doha, Qatar; they placed third at the tournament.

== History ==
Women's rugby was first introduced in Iran in the early 2000s. The women's sevens team played in August 2010 in Cortina d'Ampezzo, Italy. In October 2012 Iran competed at the Asia Rugby Women's Sevens in Pune, India, defeating India to take 11th place.

== Rugby Seven Results ==
Asia Rugby Women's Sevens Series

Founded in 2009.

Years W D L F A

1. 2024 0 0 5 0 0
2. 2023 3 0 2 63 63
3. 2021 2 1 3 49 50
4. 2015 1 0 5 54 112
5. 2013 2 0 4 58 166
6. 2012 3 0 3 61 104
7. 2011 3 0 2 36 62
8. 2009 2 0 5 67 144

2009: 2009 ARFU Women's Sevens Championship

1. IRI 0-41 THA
2. IRI 0-30 KAZ
3. IRI 19-21 TPE
4. IRI 0-35 ARAB TEAM
5. IRI 22-0 CAM
6. IRI 19-7 MAS
7. IRI 7-10 SIN

2010: Friendly

1. IRI 0-10 ITA
2. IRI 0-33 ITA
3. IRI 10-3 Valsugana

2011: 2011 ARFU Women's Sevens Championship

1. IRI 0-12 SIN
2. IRI 17-7 MAS
3. IRI 0-38 CHN
4. IRI 7-5 KOR
5. IRI 12-0 MAS

2012: 2012 ARFU Women's Sevens Championship

1. IRI 10-5 UAE
2. IRI 0-36 KAZ
3. IRI 0-20 SIN
4. IRI 17-12 IND
5. IRI 5-24 PHI
6. IRI 29-7 KOR

2013: 2013 ARFU Women's Sevens Series

1. IRI 14-45 HKG
2. IRI 7-29 SIN
3. IRI 7-52 JPN
4. IRI 20-15 IND
5. IRI 0-17 UAE
6. IRI 10-7 PHI

2015: 2015 ARFU Women's Sevens Championships

1. IRI 0-5 IND
2. IRI 21-22 KOR
3. IRI 14-26 GUM
4. IRI 0-32 UZB
5. IRI 5-17 KOR
6. IRI 14-10 PHI

2021: 2021 Asia Rugby Women's Sevens Series

1. IRI 5-12 QAT
2. IRI 5-5 UAE
3. IRI 7-14 SYR
4. IRI 5-0 SYR
5. IRI 7-19 UAE
6. IRI 20-0 IRQ - Iran awarded match 20-0 WO

2023: 2023 Asia Rugby Women's Sevens Trophy

1. IRI 0-17 UAE
2. IRI 22-0 QAT
3. IRI 31-12 UZB
4. IRI 10-0 GUM
5. IRI 0-34 IND

2024: 2024 Asia Rugby Women's Sevens Trophy

Iran can't play in Asian Trophy.

IND,SRI,INA,NEP,UZB

== U18 Rugby Sevens ==
No team (2025).

== U20 Rugby Sevens ==
No team (2025).

== Rugby League Results ==
No team (2025).

== Rugby Union Results ==
No team (2025).
