= Guam women's national rugby sevens team =

Guam
- Union: Guam Rugby Football Union
- Coach: Paul Claros
Team kit

World Cup Sevens
- Appearances: 0

The Guam women's national rugby sevens team is Guam's national representative in Rugby sevens.

== History ==
In 2016, they participated in the 2016 Asia Rugby Women's Sevens Series and placed seventh overall. Guam also attended the Asia Rugby Women's Sevens Trophy tournament in Seria, Brunei in 2018.

They competed at the 2019 Asia Rugby Women's Sevens Trophy in Jakarta and finished in fifth place. In 2023, they participated in the Asia Rugby Sevens Trophy tournament that was held in Qatar.

== Players ==
=== Previous squads ===
Squad at 2019 Asia Rugby Women's Sevens Trophy:

- Rosae Calvo (CoCap)
- Olivia Elliott (CoCap)
- Patrisha Manlulu
- Hazel Ochavillo
- Nikkie Paulino
- Tori Starr
- Paige Surber
- Kayla Taguacta
- Kimberly Taguacta
- Vana Terlaje
- Vina Terlaje

== Tournament history ==
=== Pacific Games ===
Pacific Games
Year	Round	Position	Pld	W	D	L
(New Caledonia) 2011	5th Place Playoff	6th	8	1	1	6
(Papua New Guinea) 2015	Did Not Compete					
(Samoa) 2019	Did Not Compete					
(Solomon Islands) 2023	Did Not Compete					
Total	0 Titles	1/4	8	1	1	6

== See also ==
- Rugby union in Guam
