= United Arab Emirates women's national rugby sevens team =

Rugby team

The United Arab Emirates women's national rugby sevens team represents the United Arab Emirates in rugby sevens. They won the 2021 West Asia women's 7s trophy and 2023 Asia Rugby Women's 7s trophy in Doha.
