= South Korea women's national rugby sevens team =

South Korea Women's Sevens
- Union: Korea Rugby Union
- Coach: Moon Young-Chan
- Captain: Min Kyung-Jin

South Korea's women's national sevens rugby union team represents South Korea in Rugby sevens at international level.

== Tournament history ==
=== Summer Olympics ===
Olympic Games record
Year	Round	Position	Pld	W	L	D
(Brazil) 2016	Did not qualify					
(Japan) 2020	Did not qualify					
Total	0 Title	0/2	0	0	0	0

=== Rugby World Cup Sevens ===
World Cup record
Year	Round	Position	Pld	W	L	D
(United Arab Emirates) 2009	Did not qualify					
(Russia) 2013	Did not qualify					
(United States) 2018	Did not qualify					
(South Africa) 2022	Did not qualify					
Total	0 Title	0/4	0	0	0	0

=== Asian Games ===
Asian Games record
Year	Round	Position	Pld	W	L	D
(China) 2010	7th Place Final	8th	6	0	6	0
(South Korea) 2014	9th Place Final	9th	5	1	4	0
(Indonesia) 2018	7th Place Final	7th	6	1	5	0
Total	0 Title	3/3	17	2	15	0

== Current squad ==
Squad at 2010 Asian Games:

Squad	Height	Weight	Birthdate/Age
Hye Young Choi	1.69 m (5 ft 6 1/2 in)	57 kg (126 lb)	February 8, 1990 (age 36)
Min Ji Kim	1.62 m (5 ft 4 in)	55 kg (121 lb)	March 11, 1988 (age 38)
Ha Ni Jeong	1.6 m (5 ft 3 in)	62 kg (137 lb)	August 7, 1989 (age 37)
So Yeon Park	1.57 m (5 ft 2 in)	52 kg (115 lb)	May 4, 1991 (age 35)
Min Hui Lee	1.68 m (5 ft 6 in)	63 kg (139 lb)	January 6, 1987 (age 39)
Kyun Jin Min (c)	1.65 m (5 ft 5 in)	55 kg (121 lb)	May 1, 1984 (age 42)
Jungeun Song	1.62 m (5 ft 4 in)	53 kg (117 lb)	September 15, 1987 (age 39)
Eun-Su Joo	1.72 m (5 ft 7 1/2 in)	62 kg (137 lb)	July 30, 1988 (age 38)
da Heen Kim	1.65 m (5 ft 5 in)	60 kg (130 lb)	August 12, 1989 (age 37)
Seon Ah Kim	1.6 m (5 ft 3 in)	58 kg (128 lb)	September 18, 1987 (age 39)
Seon Eun Chae	1.57 m (5 ft 2 in)	52 kg (115 lb)	February 25, 1993 (age 33)
Agada Kim	1.68 m (5 ft 6 in)	62 kg (137 lb)	March 3, 1990 (age 36)

=== Team management ===
- Manager: Dong Ho Kang
- Physiotherapist: Heyok Jun Lee

== 2010 Asian Games ==
=== Pool A ===
Team	Pld	W	D	L	PF	PA	PD	Pts
China	3	3	0	0	116	0	+116	9
Thailand	3	2	0	1	65	50	+15	7
Hong Kong	3	1	0	2	50	46	−4	5
South Korea	3	0	0	3	0	135	−135	3

- China 51 – 0 South Korea
- Thailand 48 – 0 South Korea
- Hong Kong 36 – 0 South Korea

Quarterfinals

- Kazakhstan 52 – 0 South Korea

5th - 8th Place Play-off

5–8 placing
November 23
India	0
Japan	46
November 23
South Korea	5
Singapore	31

5th/6th placing
November 23
Japan	31
Singapore	0
7th/8th placing
November 23
India	21
South Korea	10
